= Wonderland season 2 =

Wonderland
- Season 2
- DVD cover
- No. of episodes: 15

Release
- Original network: Network Ten
- Original release: 15 October – 19 November 2014

Season chronology
- ← Previous; Season 1 Next → Season 3

The second season of the Australian drama television series Wonderland, began airing on 15 October 2014 on Network Ten and will conclude on 19 November 2014. The season aired on Wednesdays at 8:30pm.

== Production ==
On 22 January 2014, it was announced that Network Ten had ordered another 22 episodes of Wonderland to air in 2014 and 2015.

Rick Maier, the head of Drama at Ten, stated, "All power to the cast and crew who delivered such a fun show for us last year. We are looking forward to more stories of love, lust and intrigue from the busiest and most romantic block of flats in the country." Filming for the second season began in March 2014.

Of the second season, Jo Porter, the director of Drama at Fremantle Media, stated, "We will be building on the strengths of the warmth, romance and humour of our Wonderland residents. In season two viewers will share unexpected twists and turns, fast-paced storylines and dramatic cliff hangers that will test all our characters. We are looking forward to viewers getting to know Australia's favourite flatmates even better as they face love affairs, break-ups and revelations of deep secrets within the Wonderland building. We all can't wait to get started."

== Plot ==
Set in an apartment building beside an Australian beach, Wonderland is a relationship drama revolving around four couples as they navigate their relationships, face the challenges life presents, and pursue their dreams.

The residents of Wonderland find that maintaining a relationship, a career and friendships is not always straightforward.

== Cast ==
=== Main cast ===
- Anna Bamford as Miranda Beaumont
- Michael Dorman as Tom Wilcox
- Emma Lung as Collette Riger
- Tracy Mann as Maggie Wilcox
- Glenn McMillan as Carlos Dos Santos
- Ben Mingay as Rob Duffy
- Tim Ross as Steve Beaumont
- Brooke Satchwell as Grace Barnes
- Jessica Tovey as Dani Varvaris

=== Recurring cast ===
- Les Hill as Max Saliba (9 episodes)
- Ewen Leslie as Nick Deakin (8 episodes)
- Martin Sacks as Callan Beaumont (7 episodes)
- Simone Kessell as Sasha Clarke (7 episodes)
- Michael Booth as Harry Hewitt (6 episodes)
- Elise Jansen as Ava McGuire (5 episodes)
- Peter Phelps as Warwick Wilcox (4 episodes)
- Maggie Dence as Ruth MacPherson (2 episodes)
- Roy Billing as Peter Varvaris (2 episodes)
- Joy Smithers as Felicity Philips (2 episodes)

=== Guest cast ===
- Heloisa McMillan as Mama (2 episodes)
- Claire Lovering as Rebecca Morris (2 episode)
- Sandy Winton as Liam (2 episodes)
- Helen Dallimore as Bianca Deakin (1 episode)
- Lydia Sarks as Leigh Burrows (1 episode)
- Renee Lim as Song Luu (1 episode)
- Daniel Krige as Alex (1 episode)
- Mirko Grillini as Trent Morris (1 episode)
- Christie Whelan Browne as Kristen (1 episode)

==== Casting ====
Former Rescue Special Ops actor Les Hill and former Blue Heelers actor Martin Sacks both joined the supporting cast as Max Saliba and Cal Beaumont, respectively. Christie Whelan Browne reprised her character of Kristen in one episode.

== Episodes ==
No. overall	No. in series	Title	Directed by	Written by	Original release date	AUS viewers (millions)
14	1	"Relationship Status"	Tori Garrett	James Walker	13 August 2014	0.519
When Rob changes his online status to Separated, a devastated Colette forces him to make a call on their marriage. Miranda, Tom and Steve are still at loggerheads over the bet, until Steve forces Tom to move on with another woman. Dani and Steve have a heated boys-vs-girls debate, Maggie's doomed attempt to make a new male friend sees her break her silence with Warwick, and a nervous Grace introduces Carlos to her parents with mixed results.
15	2	"Standing in Line"	Jet Wilkinson	Marieke Hardy	20 August 2014	0.532
Dani is queueing for bread when she inadvertently puts her job on the line. Rob drags Tom out to a nightclub, determined to meet a girl, get laid and put his marriage behind him. Carlos fears Grace is putting a new male colleague ahead of him when she throws a 70s party in his honour. Miranda is dangerously intrigued by Tom's old flame when Maggie and Colette spark her curiosity. Colette moves out... and into a new phase of life alone.
16	3	"Fear of Missing Out"	Jet Wilkinson	Jeff Truman	27 August 2014	0.501
Caught between Carlos' jealousy and Nick's effortless charm, Grace decides she needs to get rational or risk missing out on Mr Right. Rob's fear of missing out leads him to join the party when Colette throws FAT Night at her new place. Dani is waiting on a call-back for a job... and refuses to go anywhere without her phone. Tom puts his friendship with a sick Miranda back on track when he steps into a paparazzi gig and saves the day.
17	4	"First World Problems"	Peter Salmon	Kirsty Fisher	3 September 2014	0.532
Rob's depression is highlighted when Harry reveals an unexpected side to his personal life. Miranda and Tom argue over charity but share a special connection when night falls. Torn between two jobs, Dani finally realises she has more than enough fashion in her life. Grace is pursued by Nick but she keeps him at arm's length with her five-date rule.
18	5	"Monogamy"	Peter Salmon	Nick King	10 September 2014	0.478
Maggie gets a shock when Warwick admits there is a rival for his affections on the homefront. When Miranda has a hot fantasy about Tom, she decides its time to put some distance between them. Colette takes off her wedding ring when Rob puts monogamy behind him with a temptress from his past. Steve's loyalty is tested when he is head-hunted by a rival company. Grace keeps a firm rein on her progression with her dishy colleague Nick.
19	6	"Saving Face"	Jennifer Leacey	Sarah Walker	17 September 2014	0.458
Cracks appear for the Wilcox family when the true extent of Warwick's financial disaster is exposed at the Wonderland BBQ... and Tom's solution proves unpopular. Grace is shocked when Nick reveals his impatience but news about Carlos sees her jump to the next stage in their relationship. Miranda's attempt to put Tom behind her has a surprising twist for her friends. Dani finds herself keeping secrets for her troubled teenage step-sister.
20	7	"Narcissism"	Jennifer Leacey	Christopher Burke	24 September 2014	0.418
Tom's chain of one-night stands is a sore point for Miranda until he reveals the true motivation for his actions. Steve's quest to protect his sister leads Carlos to give him some long-overdue home truths. A spontaneous moment with Colette's young college friend leaves Rob feeling lonelier than ever. A work crisis highlights a dark side to Nick... but Grace finds there are benefits to be had.
21	8	"Liking"	Darren Ashton	Josephine Dee Barrett	1 October 2014	0.458
A potential romantic interlude for Tom and Miranda is derailed when fate intervenes and leads the star-crossed lovers astray. An accident at Rob's work sees his relationship with Colette turn a new corner. Steve's enthusiasm for his new job leads to amusing conflict with Dani. Grace playing mum to Nick's little girl bonds the couple further. Maggie's mother is willing to bail them out but Maggie feels the cost is too high.
22	9	"Milestones"	Darren Ashton	Sarah Walker	8 October 2014	0.443
Tom is ready to sell his car and start a new chapter... just as Miranda's best friend, Ava, comes to stay – their mutual attraction overshadows Miranda's joy at her first exhibition. Steve has an anniversary surprise for Dani that may change their lives forever. Colette and Carlos go on holidays, forcing Rob to act on his feelings at last. Grace's romantic bubble with Nick is burst when she discovers the truth. Maggie's decision to support Warwick is thwarted at the eleventh hour.
23	10	"Home"	Darren Ashton	Sarah Walker	15 October 2014	0.458
As they get ready to head to Singapore, an accident threatens to unravel Dani and Steve's plans. Miranda warns Ava about Tom's attitude and history with his past housemates. When Colette and Carlos return from Brazil, Rob grows increasingly worried that they are hiding secrets. After being confronted by Nick's wife, Grace seeks solace in her new career venture. Maggie and her mother butt heads until Ruth's underlying despair is revealed. Max Saliba, a mysterious new tenant, moves into Wonderland.
24	11	"Secrets"	Darren Ashton	Jeff Truman	22 October 2014	0.447
Miranda discovers Tom and Ava's secret sexual relationship, but eventually finds a distraction while flirting with Max. After making it obvious he can't wait to take her to Singapore, Steve finally realises that Dani is putting on a brave face. Carlos falls into the arms of cougar, Felicity in a bid to escape his fear and loneliness. After learning about what happened in Rio, Rob does his best to distract Colette and take her mind off her memories of the accident.
25	12	"Sex"	Julie Money	Christopher Burke	29 October 2014	0.463
Carlos' visa is thrown into jeopardy when he interferes in a domestic violence situation. When she discovers that she has been overlooked for a promotion, Grace is furious. Miranda seeks for independence through sex. Tom invites Ava to be a part of his family. A mysterious gift prompts Rob to come clean about the lady he slept with when he and Colette were on a break. Steve and Dani's relationship is put to the test due to technical difficulties and time differences.
26	13	"Burn"	Julie Money	Marieke Hardy	5 November 2014	0.452
Despite warnings that he might not feel the same way, Miranda continues to grow smitten with Max. An unexpected offer derails a homesick Steve's plans to bring Dani over to Singapore. Colette feels hurt when she learns that Rob still hasn't told his family that they are back together. Carlos seeks help from Grace as he faces deportation. After Tom plans a romantic evening for himself and Ava, his old flame Sasha turns up and throws everything into disarray.
27	14	"Haunted"	Jennifer Leacey	James Walker	12 November 2014	0.455
28	15	"Blind"	Jennifer Leacey	Josephine Dee Barrett	19 November 2014	0.429

== Ratings ==
Episode	Title	Original airdate	Overnight Viewers	Consolidated Viewers	Nightly Rank	Adjusted Rank
2–1	"Relationship Status"	13 August 2014	0.519	0.606	Not in Top 20	–
2-2	"Standing in Line"	20 August 2014	0.532	0.642	20	–
2–3	"Fear of Missing Out"	27 August 2014	0.501	0.625	Not in Top 20	–
2–4	"First World Problems"	3 September 2014	0.532	0.633	Not in Top 20	–
2–5	"Monogamy"	10 September 2014	0.478	0.565	Not in Top 20	–
2–6	"Full Disclosure"	17 September 2014	0.458	0.573	Not in Top 20	–
2–7	"Narcissism"	24 September 2014	0.418	0.529	Not in Top 20	–
2–8	"Liking"	1 October 2014	0.458	0.582	Not in Top 20	–
2–9	"Milestones"	8 October 2014	0.443	0.578	Not in Top 20	–
2-10	Home	15 October 2014	0.458	0.534	Not in Top 20	–
2-11	Secrets	22 October 2014	0.447	0.571	Not in Top 20	–
2-12	Sex	29 October 2014	0.463	0.589	Not in Top 20	–
2-13	Burn	5 November 2014	0.452	0.558	Not in Top 20	–
2-14	Haunted	12 November 2014	0.455	0.588	Not in Top 20	–
2-15	Blind	19 November 2014	0.429	0.538	19	15

- Figures are OzTAM Data for the 5 City Metro areas.
- Overnight – Live broadcast and recordings viewed the same night.
- Consolidated – Live broadcast and recordings viewed within the following seven days.
