= Wonderland season 1 =

Wonderland
- Season 1
- DVD cover
- No. of episodes: 13

Release
- Original network: Network Ten
- Original release: 21 August – 13 November 2013

Season chronology
- Next → Season 2

The first season of the Australian drama television series Wonderland, began airing on 21 August 2013 on Network Ten. The finale aired on 13 November 2013. The season consisted of 13 episodes and aired on Wednesdays at 8:30pm.

== Production ==
On 2 July 2012, the Ten announced a new drama project from Fremantle Media named Wonderland, a 22-episode project set to air in two seasons - a drama series by Jo Porter and Sarah Walker.

== Cast ==
=== Main ===
- Anna Bamford as Miranda Beaumont
- Michael Dorman as Tom Wilcox
- Emma Lung as Collette Riger
- Tracy Mann as Maggie Wilcox
- Glenn McMillan as Carlos Dos Santos
- Ben Mingay as Rob Duffy
- Tim Ross as Steve Beaumont
- Brooke Satchwell as Grace Barnes
- Jessica Tovey as Dani Varvaris

=== Recurring ===
- Christie Whelan Browne as Kristen
- Peter Phelps as Warwick Wilcox
- Michael Booth as Harry Hewitt

=== Guest ===
- Matt Abercromby as Ben
- Roy Billing as Peter Varvaris
- Maggie Dence as Ruth MacPherson
- Tom O'Sullivan as Adam Evans
- Gia Carides as Helena

== Episodes ==
No. overall	No. in series	Title	Directed by	Written by	Original release date	AUS viewers (millions)
1	1	"Weddings"	Tori Garrett	Sarah Walker	21 August 2013	0.948
The series opens with everyone coming together for Dani and Steve's wedding. Steve's sister, Miranda, arrives late, so Tom is forced to give the speech. Kristen asks Tom to marry her at the reception, but Tom turns her down and she pushes him into the cake. Colette and Rob discuss having a baby, while Grace meets Carlos and has sex with him. Tom bets Steve that he will not have sex with a female housemate for 12 months. If he does, he loses his 1964 Ford.
2	2	"Obsession"	Tori Garrett	Margaret Wilson	28 August 2013	0.769
After signing the napkin treaty, Tom is tested by his attraction to Miranda. He later allows her to move in with him, angering Steve. Colette and Rob try to sort through their issues, while Grace tries to avoid Carlos following their one-night stand. Tom hosts a Food Appreciation Time (FAT) dinner, which Kristen gatecrashes.
3	3	"Parking"	Jonathan Brough	James Walker	4 September 2013	0.688
Steve discovers Dani's unpaid parking fines and learns that she has maxed out her credit cards, causing them to fight. After suffering from panic attacks, Colette confesses to Rob that she had a one-night stand. Grace has sex with Carlos again. While taking her mother, Ruth, home, Maggie is pulled over by the police for drink driving. Tom and Miranda share a drunken kiss after they both experience disastrous dates.
4	4	"Celebrity"	Jonathan Brough	Marieke Hardy	11 September 2013	0.607
Things are awkward between Tom and Miranda following their kiss. When Kristen's proposal to Tom is broadcast on a television show, she asks Tom if he will attend a counselling session with her. Rob learns that Colette had her affair with a barista and he attacks him. After a difficult day at work, Dani quits her job. Carlos asks Grace to take their relationship public, while she moves into the Wonderland building. Maggie tries to keep her DUI case a secret from her husband, Warwick.
5	5	"Dreams"	Jo O'Shaughnessy	John Ridley	18 September 2013	0.637
Tom's father, Warwick, turns up and asks his son to lease the family's wine vineyard to a mining company. Maggie tries to stay out of it, but ends up telling Warwick a few home truths. Carlos and Grace each try to help Rob and Colette. Rob meets a surfer on the South Coast and almost has sex with her, before returning home. Steve competes for a promotion with his workplace enemy Jason.
6	6	"Personal Space"	Jo O'Shaughnessy	Jeff Truman	25 September 2013	0.420
The group find out about Colette's affair when Dani tells Steve. Rob continues to struggle with his wife's infidelity. While helping to create a photo gallery for Tom's website, Miranda realises she might have feelings for him. Grace tells Carlos that she needs her space.
7	7	"Hooking Up"	Jet Wilkinson	Alicia Walsh	2 October 2013	0.543
Miranda get back into the dating scene with the help of Dani's themed dating idea and Tom. Grace becomes suspicious of Carlos when he comes home in the morning and thinks he might have had a one-night stand. Steve helps Carlos when he loses his phone at a client's house. Maggie struggles to Skype Warwick and calls the wrong person.
8	8	"Macho"	Jet Wilkinson	Sarah Walker	9 October 2013	0.563
Grace is shocked and angry when Carlos's protective side comes out during a confrontation with a cyclist. When the police catch up with Carlos, they threaten to contact immigration. Tom is disappointed when a business deal for his furniture goes wrong and contemplates selling his car to raise some money. Colette tries to please Rob by riding the bike he bought her, but it brings up problems for them both. Steve also tries riding a bike to work, but it costs him a contract.
9	9	"Exes"	Darren Ashton	Clare Atkins	16 October 2013	0.507
Tom comes face-to-face with his ex-girlfriends Shay and Kristen, while Miranda's ex-fiancé arrives in town. Warwick returns to celebrate his birthday and Maggie asks him for a divorce. Dani and Steve argue about him wanting to have lunch with a female ex-colleague. Colette and Rob visit his parents, where Colette gets the feeling her in-law's do not like her, especially after they invite his ex-girlfriend to lunch.
10	10	"Mothers"	Darren Ashton	Sarah Smith	23 October 2013	0.499
Steve reveals his fears with children, when he and Dani babysit twins. They come into conflict when Dani leaves one of the babies alone. Meanwhile, Adam proposes to Miranda again, but she rejects him and lashes out at Tom. Colette believes she is pregnant, but her doctor tells her that her hormone levels are too low. Carlos and Grace get involved in an incident with a woman who is breast-feeding her baby in a restaurant, leading her to be banned. Maggie looks for advice from her mother about her problems with Warrick.
11	11	"Comfort Zone"	Jo O'Shaughnessy	Clare Atkins	30 October 2013	0.516
With Adam staying over more frequently, Tom decides to begin dating again. Maggie tries to set him up on a date with her swimming partner. Meanwhile, Dani learns that her father has cancer and she goes out of town to take care of him. Rob is unhappy when Tom begins working with the Barista and he forgets his and Colette's wedding anniversary. They later decide to renew their vows. Grace gets a Brazilian wax for Carlos, but soon discovers that he prefers the natural look and tries to put off having sex with him.
12	12	"Equal Rights"	Jo O'Shaughnessy	Samantha Strauss	6 November 2013	0.502
Dani faces one of her biggest emotional challenges when her mother invites her to her gay wedding. Helena is marrying her long-term partner – the woman she left Dani's father for. It might have happened seventeen years ago but Dani still refuses to attend the commitment ceremony. Will they find a resolution? When Tom learns about Adam's backward ideas, he sets out to expose him, leading to a moment with Miranda. Looking after Dani's dad makes Maggie realise she will always be Warwick's wife, divorce or not. Grace is perturbed by the revelation that Carlos has dabbled with the other sex.
13	13	"Messages"	Tori Garrett	Margaret Wilson	13 November 2013	0.626
Tom finally decides to tell Miranda about the bet, but the message never gets through as he is prevented by a series of unlucky events... and Steve's concerns for his sister. Rob and Colette's vow renewal threatens to become a disaster when he intercepts messages from her ex-lover; Carlos drops the L word, and Grace tries to give him the message she's not ready for it.

== Ratings ==
The premiere episode debuted to 948,000 viewers and came 4th for the night in its 8:30 timeslot.

Episode	Title	Original airdate	Overnight Viewers	Consolidated Viewers	Nightly Rank	Weekly Rank
1-01	"Weddings"	21 August 2013	0.948	1.055	4	–
1-02	"Obsession"	28 August 2013	0.769	0.902	9	–
1-03	"Parking"	4 September 2013	0.688	0.800	15	–
1-04	"Celebrity"	11 September 2013	0.607	0.787	14	–
1-05	"Dreams"	18 September 2013	0.637	0.784	13	–
1-06	"Personal Space"	25 September 2013	0.420	0.537	N/A	–
1-07	"Hooking Up"	2 October 2013	0.543	0.677	11	–
1-08	"Macho"	9 October 2013	0.563	0.696	15	–
1-09	"Exes"	16 October 2013	0.507	0.650	15	–
1-10	"Mothers"	23 October 2013	0.499	0.619	16	–
1-11	"Comfort Zone"	30 October 2013	0.516	0.652	15	–
1-12	"Equal Rights"	6 November 2013	0.502	0.653	15	–
1-13	"Messages"	13 November 2013	0.626	0.797	8	–

Figures are OzTAM Data for the five City Metro areas. Overnight - Live broadcast and recordings viewed the same night. Consolidated - Live broadcast and recordings viewed within the following seven days.
