= Wonderland season 3 =

Wonderland
- Season 3
- DVD cover
- No. of episodes: 16

Release
- Original network: Network Ten
- Original release: 4 February – 20 May 2015

Season chronology
- ← Previous; Season 2

The third and final season of the Australian drama television series Wonderland, began airing on 4 February 2015 on Network Ten. The series concluded on 20 May 2015

== Production ==
On 22 January 2014, it was announced that Network Ten had ordered another 22 episodes of Wonderland. Of the 22 episodes, only 16 would be aired as the third season.

Rick Maier, the head of Drama at Ten stated, "All power to the cast and crew who delivered such a fun show for us last year. We are looking forward to more stories of love, lust and intrigue from the busiest and most romantic block of flats in the country." Filming for the third season was back-to-back with the second season - it commenced in March 2014 and wrapped in December 2014.

Of the third season, Tim Ross stated, "[Season three] gets intense. A lot of things happen to the characters, but we don't know if it [season three] will be the last. We would love to do another season."

== Plot ==
Set in an apartment building on the doorstep of one of Australia's most beautiful beaches, Wonderland is a warm, light-hearted and engaging relationship drama revolving around four very different couples as they navigate the pitfalls of love, meet the challenges life presents head on, and pursue their dreams.

With an idyllic beachside as the backdrop, the residents of Wonderland show that holding down a dream relationship, an attractive career and maintaining solid friendships is sometimes anything other than plain sailing.

== Cast ==
=== Main ===
- Anna Bamford as Miranda Beaumont
- Michael Dorman as Tom Wilcox
- Emma Lung as Collette Riger
- Tracy Mann as Maggie Wilcox
- Glenn McMillan as Carlos Dos Santos
- Ben Mingay as Rob Duffy
- Tim Ross as Steve Beaumont
- Brooke Satchwell as Grace Barnes
- Jessica Tovey as Dani Varvaris

=== Recurring ===
- Simone Kessell as Sasha Clarke (10 episodes)
- Les Hill as Max Saliba (10 episodes)
- Martin Sacks as Callan Beaumont (9 episodes)
- Michael Booth as Harry Hewitt (6 episodes)
- Peter Phelps as Warwick Wilcox (5 episodes)

=== Guest ===
- Mia Pistorius as Jade (5 episodes)
- Sandy Winton as Liam (3 episodes)
- Christie Whelan Browne as Kristen (1 episode)
- Elise Jansen as Ava McGuire (1 episode)
- Mirko Grillini as Trent Morris (1 episode)
- Claire Lovering as Rebecca Morris (1 episode)
- Gia Carides as Helena (1 episode)
- Kate Raison as Katharine Barnes (1 episode)

== Episodes ==
No. overall	No. in series	Title	Directed by	Written by	Original release date	AUS viewers (millions)
29	1	"Rescue"	Darren Ashton	Nick King	4 February 2015	0.445
Tom's decision to rescue his ex-girlfriend Sasha, late at night leaves his relationship with Ava on wafer-thin ice. Callan's attempt to bond with Steve over fishing results in a potentially life-threatening accident. Carlos and Grace's fraudulent wedding takes places. After uncovering the fraudulent wedding, Dani and Miranda discover that Rob is having a baby with the woman he had a relationship with whilst he and Colette were separated.
30	2	"Rejection"	Darren Ashton	Sarah Walker	11 February 2015	0.438
With his unhealthy passion for Sasha reignited following his breakup with Ava, will Tom close himself off to Miranda's friendship as he seeks to make a new connection with his old flame? Carlos tries to do the right thing by Grace. Dani surprises Steve in Singapore but walks into a surprise of her own that sets off a chain of emotional turmoil that will change their lives.
31	3	"Baggage"	Jo O'Shaughnessy	Margaret Wilson	18 February 2015	0.397
Sasha is now back in Tom's life and causing havoc, however tempers soon boil over when Tom learns his mother previously ordered Sasha to have an abortion. Maggie's distress over Tom's discovery pushes her into the arms of Callan and she cheats on Warwick. Miranda learns that Max is selling drugs. Jade wants to tell Rob about her pregnancy, but will he betray Colette for her?
32	4	"Withholding"	Jo O'Shaughnessy	Jeff Truman	25 February 2015	0.429
33	5	"Toxic"	Jennifer Leacey	Alicia Walsh	4 March 2015	0.373
34	6	"Fathers"	Jennifer Leacey	Marieke Hardy	11 March 2015	0.494
35	7	"Split"	Adrian Russell Wills	Samantha Strauss	18 March 2015	0.401
36	8	"The Other Woman"	Adrian Russell Wills	James Walker	25 March 2015	0.368
37	9	"Boundaries"	Darren Ashton	Marieke Hardy & Clare Atkins	8 April 2015	0.384
38	10	"Strange Bedfellows"	Darren Ashton	Sarah Mayberry	15 April 2015	0.351
39	11	"Epic"	Catherine Millar	Nick King	22 April 2015	0.382
40	12	"True Love"	Catherine Millar	Kirsty Fisher	22 April 2015	0.366
41	13	"Wild"	Ian Gilmour	Justine Gillmer	29 April 2015	0.405
42	14	"Lost"	Ian Gilmour	Jeff Truman	6 May 2015	0.489
43	15	"Truth"	Jennifer Leacey	Marieke Hardy	13 May 2015	0.535
44	16	"Commitment"	Jennifer Leacey	Sarah Walker	20 May 2015	0.635

== Ratings ==
Episode	Title	Original airdate	Overnight Viewers	Nightly Rank	Consolidated Viewers	Adjusted Rank
3-1	"Rescue"	4 February 2015	0.445	–	0.501	#20
3-2	"Rejection"	11 February 2015	0.438	–	–	–
3-3	"Baggage"	18 February 2015	0.397	–	–	–
3-4	"Withholding"	25 February 2015	0.429	–	–	–
3-5	"Toxic"	4 March 2015	0.373	–	–	–
3-6	"Fathers"	11 March 2015	0.494	–	–	–
3-7	"Split"	18 March 2015	0.401	–	–	–
3-8	"The Other Woman"	25 March 2015	0.368	–	–	–
3-9	"Boundaries"	8 April 2015	0.384	–	0.507	–
3-10	"Strange Bedfellows"	15 April 2015	0.351	–	–	–
3-11	"Epic"	22 April 2015	0.382	–	–	–
3-12	"True Love"	22 April 2015	0.366	–	–	–
3-13	"Wild"	29 April 2015	0.405	–	–	–
3-14	"Lost"	6 May 2015	0.489	–	–	–
3-15	"Truth"	13 May 2015	0.535	–	–	–
3-16	"Commitment""	20 May 2015	0.635	#16	–	–
