= List of Wonderland episodes =

Wonderland is an Australian television drama. It was created by Jo Porter and Sarah Walker. It premiered on Ten on 21 August 2013. Set in Wonderland, a unique and chaotic apartment building on the doorstep of one of Australia’s most beautiful beaches; join a group of mixed-up twenty-somethings as they navigate the humorous and sometimes painful minefield of love, sex and friendship. On 26 October 2015, it was announced that Wonderland had been cancelled after it "failed to find a sufficient audience". During the course of the programme, 44 episodes of Wonderland aired over three series.

== Series overview ==
Series	Episodes	Originally released	
Series	Episodes	First released	Last released
1	13	21 August 2013	13 November 2013
2	15	13 August 2014	19 November 2014
3	16	4 February 2015	20 May 2015

== Episodes ==
=== Season 1 (2013) ===
No. overall	No. in series	Title	Directed by	Written by	Original release date	AUS viewers (millions)
1	1	"Weddings"	Tori Garrett	Sarah Walker	21 August 2013	0.948
2	2	"Obsession"	Tori Garrett	Margaret Wilson	28 August 2013	0.769
3	3	"Parking"	Jonathan Brough	James Walker	4 September 2013	0.688
4	4	"Celebrity"	Jonathan Brough	Marieke Hardy	11 September 2013	0.607
5	5	"Dreams"	Jo O'Shaughnessy	John Ridley	18 September 2013	0.637
6	6	"Personal Space"	Jo O'Shaughnessy	Jeff Truman	25 September 2013	0.420
7	7	"Hooking Up"	Jet Wilkinson	Alicia Walsh	2 October 2013	0.543
8	8	"Macho"	Jet Wilkinson	Sarah Walker	9 October 2013	0.563
9	9	"Exes"	Darren Ashton	Clare Atkins	16 October 2013	0.507
10	10	"Mothers"	Darren Ashton	Sarah Smith	23 October 2013	0.499
11	11	"Comfort Zone"	Jo O'Shaughnessy	Clare Atkins	30 October 2013	0.516
12	12	"Equal Rights"	Jo O'Shaughnessy	Samantha Strauss	6 November 2013	0.502
13	13	"Messages"	Tori Garrett	Margaret Wilson	13 November 2013	0.626

=== Season 2 (2014) ===
No. overall	No. in series	Title	Directed by	Written by	Original release date	AUS viewers (millions)
14	1	"Relationship Status"	Tori Garrett	James Walker	13 August 2014	0.519
15	2	"Standing in Line"	Jet Wilkinson	Marieke Hardy	20 August 2014	0.532
16	3	"Fear of Missing Out"	Jet Wilkinson	Jeff Truman	27 August 2014	0.501
17	4	"First World Problems"	Peter Salmon	Kirsty Fisher	3 September 2014	0.532
18	5	"Monogamy"	Peter Salmon	Nick King	10 September 2014	0.478
19	6	"Saving Face"	Jennifer Leacey	Sarah Walker	17 September 2014	0.458
20	7	"Narcissism"	Jennifer Leacey	Christopher Burke	24 September 2014	0.418
21	8	"Liking"	Darren Ashton	Josephine Dee Barrett	1 October 2014	0.458
22	9	"Milestones"	Darren Ashton	Sarah Walker	8 October 2014	0.443
23	10	"Home"	Darren Ashton	Sarah Walker	15 October 2014	0.458
24	11	"Secrets"	Darren Ashton	Jeff Truman	22 October 2014	0.447
25	12	"Sex"	Julie Money	Christopher Burke	29 October 2014	0.463
26	13	"Burn"	Julie Money	Marieke Hardy	5 November 2014	0.452
27	14	"Haunted"	Jennifer Leacey	James Walker	12 November 2014	0.455
28	15	"Blind"	Jennifer Leacey	Josephine Dee Barrett	19 November 2014	0.429

=== Season 3 (2015) ===
No. overall	No. in series	Title	Directed by	Written by	Original release date	AUS viewers (millions)
29	1	"Rescue"	Darren Ashton	Nick King	4 February 2015	0.445
30	2	"Rejection"	Darren Ashton	Sarah Walker	11 February 2015	0.438
31	3	"Baggage"	Jo O'Shaughnessy	Margaret Wilson	18 February 2015	0.397
32	4	"Withholding"	Jo O'Shaughnessy	Jeff Truman	25 February 2015	0.429
33	5	"Toxic"	Jennifer Leacey	Alicia Walsh	4 March 2015	0.373
34	6	"Fathers"	Jennifer Leacey	Marieke Hardy	11 March 2015	0.494
35	7	"Split"	Adrian Russell Wills	Samantha Strauss	18 March 2015	0.401
36	8	"The Other Woman"	Adrian Russell Wills	James Walker	25 March 2015	0.368
37	9	"Boundaries"	Darren Ashton	Marieke Hardy & Clare Atkins	8 April 2015	0.384
38	10	"Strange Bedfellows"	Darren Ashton	Sarah Mayberry	15 April 2015	0.351
39	11	"Epic"	Catherine Millar	Nick King	22 April 2015	0.382
40	12	"True Love"	Catherine Millar	Kirsty Fisher	22 April 2015	0.366
41	13	"Wild"	Ian Gilmour	Justine Gillmer	29 April 2015	0.405
42	14	"Lost"	Ian Gilmour	Jeff Truman	6 May 2015	0.489
43	15	"Truth"	Jennifer Leacey	Marieke Hardy	13 May 2015	0.535
44	16	"Commitment"	Jennifer Leacey	Sarah Walker	20 May 2015	0.635

== Ratings ==
Wonderland : AUS viewers per episode (thousands)

Season	Episode number															
Season	1	2	3	4	5	6	7	8	9	10	11	12	13	14	15	16
1	948	769	688	607	637	420	543	563	507	499	516	502	626	–		
2	519	532	501	532	478	458	418	458	443	458	447	463	452	455	429	–
3	445	438	397	429	373	494	401	368	384	351	382	366	405	489	535	635

Source: Audience measurement performed by OzTam
