= Max Brown (Australian actor) =

Australian actor

Max Brown is an Australian film, television and theatre actor from Melbourne, Victoria. Max is best known for his portrayal of Oscar Wolfe in the TV series The Gloaming on Stan. His mainstream theatrical debut was in Benjamin Law's play Torch the Place for Melbourne Theatre Company in 2020.

== Biography ==
Brown was born in Sydney the eldest of three children. He made his onscreen acting debut on Neighbours as Robin Dawal in 2015.

== Filmography ==
=== Film ===
Year	Title	Role	Notes
2016	Waiting for Angel	Aaron	Short film
2021	We're Not Here To Fuck Spiders	Jimmy	

=== Television ===
Year	Title	Role	Notes
2015	Neighbours	Robin Dawal	Guest role (3 episodes)
2016	Bringing Our Stories Home	Samuel Tongway	On The Margins
2016	Secret City	Kevin Dang	Recurring (4 episodes)
2017-2019	Glitch	David Goldman	Recurring (6 episodes)
2019	Bad Mothers	Troy	Recurring (3 episodes)
2019	The Gloaming	Oscar Wolfe	Main cast (8 episodes)
2020	Retrograde	Rob	Main cast (6 episodes)
2020	Hungry Ghosts	James Hoang	Guest (2 episodes)
2020	The Tourist	Nathan Wong	

=== Theatre ===
Year	Title	Role	Notes
2019	Torch the Place	Paul	Actor

== Awards and nominations ==
Year	Award	Category	Work	Result
2021	Equity Ensemble Awards	Most Outstanding Performance by an Ensemble in a Comedy Series (with Maria Angelico, Nicholas Boshier, Pallavi Sharda, Esther Hannaford & Ilai Swindells)	Retrograde	Won
2021	Heath Ledger Scholarship	Scholarship Award	Film	Nominated
