= Hazem Shammas =

Palestinian Australian actor

- Born: Fassuta, Galilee, Palestine
- Occupation: Actor
- Years active: 1997 – present
- Known for: The Twelve; Safe Harbour

Hazem Shammas is a Palestinian Australian actor. He won the 2018 Logie Award for Most Outstanding Supporting Actor for Safe Harbour and was nominated for the 2018 AACTA Award for Best Lead Actor in a Television Drama for the same role.

In 2022 Shammas appeared in The Twelve, After the Verdict and Barons. Shammas also appeared in The Clearing.

In 2024, Shammas was named as part of the cast The Correspondent and Ladies In Black.

== Early life ==
Shammas was born in Fassuta, a Palestinian village in the Galilee in Northern Palestine. He immigrated to Sydney's Inner West as a baby, where he attended a Catholic school.

== Filmography ==
=== Television ===
Year	Title	Role	Notes
2025	Sunny Nights	Ozan Kelly	3 episodes
2025	NCIS: Sydney	Hasan Saberi	1 episode
2024	Fisk	Jeremiah	1 episode
2024	Last King of the Cross	Amir Haidar	6 episodes
2024	Ladies in Black	Dawud	6 episodes
2023	Bump	Hazem	4 episodes
2023	The Clearing	Yusuf Joe Saad	7 episodes
2022	The Twelwe	Farrad Jassim	10 episodes
2022	After the Verdict	Detective Sarti	2 episodes
2022	Barons	Mr. Zemenik	2 episodes
2020	Hungry Ghosts	Zaeer	1 episode
2020	Halifax: Retribution	Nicholas	1 episode
2020	The Secrets She Keeps	Cyrus Haven	3 episodes
2020	The Gloaming	Padre Eli Kruger	1 episode
2019	My Life Is Murder	Adam Jaber	1 episode
2019	The Hunting	Robert	3 episodes
2018	Safe Harbour	Ismail Al-Bayati	4 episodes
2011	At Home With Julia	Asrif the Cabbie	1 episode
2010	Underbelly	Bill Bayen	10 episodes
2009	East West 101	Massoud Irani	1 episode
2009	All Saints	Gazza Salidh	1 episode

=== Film ===
Year	Title	Role	Notes
2024	Flowers for Hamish	Julian	Short
2024	The Correspondent	Major Sami	
2015	Alex & Eve	Mohamed	
2011	X: Night of Vengeance	Willie	
2009	100 Blind Deals	Brother	Short
2009	I Wish I Were Stephanie V	Imran Bashir	
2008	The Tumbler	Tahir	
