= Logie Award for Most Outstanding Supporting Actress =

Australian television award

- Country: Australia
- Presented by: TV Week
- First award: 2016
- Currently held by: Brooke Satchwell (2023)

Highlights
- Most awards: Celia Ireland, Debra Lawrance, Jacqueline McKenzie, Jacki Weaver, Heather Mitchell & Brooke Satchwell (1)
- Website: www.tvweeklogieawards.com.au

The Silver Logie for Most Outstanding Supporting Actress is an award presented annually at the Australian TV Week Logie Awards. It was first awarded at the 58th Annual TV Week Logie Awards in 2016 and is given to recognise the outstanding performance of supporting actresses in an Australian program. The winner and nominees of this award are chosen by television industry juries. Celia Ireland was the first winner for her role in Wentworth.

== Winners and nominees ==
Key	Meaning
‡	Indicates the winning supporting actress

Year	Nominees	Program(s)	Network	Ref
2016	Celia Ireland‡	Wentworth	SoHo	
2016	Emily Barclay	Glitch	ABC	
2016	Harriet Dyer	Love Child	Nine Network	
2016	Jenni Baird	A Place to Call Home	SoHo	
2016	Rarriwuy Hick	Redfern Now	ABC	
2017	Debra Lawrance‡	Please Like Me	ABC	
2017	Jenni Baird	A Place to Call Home	SoHo	
2017	Nicole da Silva	Wentworth	Showcase	
2017	Victoria Haralabidou	Barracuda	ABC	
2017	Deborah Mailman	Wolf Creek	Stan	
2018	Jacqueline McKenzie‡	Romper Stomper	Stan	
2018	Celia Ireland	Wentworth	Showcase	
2018	Elsa Cocquerel	Wolf Creek	Stan	
2018	Jenni Baird	A Place to Call Home	Showcase	
2018	Nicole Chamoun	Safe Harbour	SBS	
2019	Jacki Weaver‡	Bloom	Stan	
2019	Asher Keddie	The Cry	ABC	
2019	Celia Ireland	Wentworth	Foxtel	
2019	Keisha Castle Hughes	On The Ropes	SBS	
2019	Susie Porter	The Second	Stan	
2022	Heather Mitchell‡	Love Me	Binge/Foxtel	
2022	Katrina Milosevic	Wentworth - The Final Sentence	Foxtel	
2022	Mabel Li	New Gold Mountain	SBS	
2022	Noni Hazlehurst	The End	Foxtel	
2022	Rachel Griffiths	Total Control	ABC	
2023	Brooke Satchwell‡	The Twelve	Binge/Foxtel	
2023	Hayley McElhinney	Mystery Road: Origin	ABC	
2023	Miranda Otto	True Colours	SBS	
2023	Pallavi Sharda	The Twelve	Binge/Foxtel	
2023	Virginia Gay	After The Verdict	Nine Network	
2023	Yerin Ha	Bad Behaviour	Stan	
