= The Twelve (Australian TV series) =

Australian TV series

- Genre: Drama
- Based on: De twaalf by Sanne Nuyens and Bert Van Dael.
- Starring: Sam Neill; Kate Mulvany; Danielle Cormack; Kris McQuade; Marta Dusseldorp; Brendan Cowell; Brooke Satchwell; Hazem Shammas
- Composer: Rafael May
- Country of origin: Australia
- Original language: English
- No. of series: 3
- No. of episodes: 26

Production
- Executive producers: Sarah Walker; Sam Neill; Alison Herbert-Burns; Penny Win; Michael Brooks; Hamish Lewis; Liz Watts
- Producers: Hamish Lewis; Ian Collie; Ally Henville; Rob Gibson
- Production locations: Parramatta, New South Wales; Artarmon, New South Wales
- Editors: Mark Perry; Nicole La Macchia
- Running time: 60 minutes
- Production companies: Warner Bros. International Television Production; Easy Tiger Productions

Original release
- Network: Fox Showcase
- Release: 21 June 2022 – present

Related
- De Twaalf

The Twelve is an Australian television drama series on Fox Showcase that premiered on 21 June 2022. It stars Sam Neill, Kate Mulvany, Marta Dusseldorp, and Brendan Cowell. The second season aired on 11 July 2024, and in September 2024 the series was renewed for a third season, which premiered on 4 August 2025.

== Plot ==
The Twelve was based on the 2019 Belgian miniseries De twaalf created by Sanne Nuyens and Bert Van Dael. It follows the story of Kate Lawson, who is on trial for the alleged murder of her niece and how the twelve jurors bring their personal lives and prejudices to the courtroom.

The second season focuses on Bernice Price (Kris McQuade) who was found dead on the Price property. On trial her daughter Sasha and farmhand Patrick, the tight-knit community must put aside past encounters to find out if they are guilty of her murder.

In the third season, Brett Colby is thrust into a murder trial that involves a long-term friend, as a mystery unravels. A murder cold-case is re-opened to find answers, as the twelve jurors find themselves struggling with the life changing experience.

== Cast ==
=== Seasons 1, 2 and 3 ===
- Sam Neill as Brett Colby

=== Season 1 ===
- Kate Mulvany as Kate Lawson
- Marta Dusseldorp as Lucy Bloom
- Brendan Cowell as Garry Thorne
- Brooke Satchwell as Georgina Merrick
- Hazem Shammas as Farrad Jessim
- Pallavi Sharda as Corrie D'Souza
- Ngali Shaw as Jarrad Saunders
- Catherine Van-Davies as Vanessa Young
- Bishanyia Vincent as Lily Powell
- Damien Strouthos as Alexi Menelaus
- Nic Cassim as Simon Cavanaugh
- Rachel Gordon as Emily Cavanaugh
- Daniel Mitchell as Peter Brodsky
- Gennie Nevinson as Margaret Brown
- Toby Blome as Greg
- Warren Lee as Trevor Morros
- Susan Kennedy as Melissa Curry
- Jenni Baird as Diane Lawson
- Matt Nable as Nathan Spears
- Silvia Colloca as Sonia Spears
- Coco Jack Gillies as Claire Spears
- Ben Mingay as Flip Menelaus
- Shane Connor as Steve Dokic
- Hamish Michael as Jamie Merrick
- Louisa Mignone as Detective Sam Chedid
- Charlotte Lucas as Belinda Bain
- Avishek Sharma as the Judge's Associate
- Josh Quong Tart as Harmon
- Lex Marinos as Nikolaos Menelaus
- Tony Briggs as Warri Saunders
- Nicholas Hope as Mr Isaacs
- Toby Schmitz as Otto

=== Seasons 2 and 3 ===
- Kaila Ferrelli as Nina Distazio

=== Season 2 ===
- Fayssal Bazzi as Jude Persand
- Frances O'Connor as Meredith Nelson-Moore
- Myles Pollard as Neal Collins
- Shareena Clanton as Kora Gardner
- Kris McQuade as Bernice Price
- Stefanie Caccamo as Claudia D'Angelo
- Erroll Shand as Patrick Harrows
- Amy Mathews as Sasha Price
- Elle Mandalis as Connie D'Angelo
- Sharon Johal as Parvinder Sangar
- Tasma Walton as Thelma Connell
- Anthony Brandon Wong as Winston Hang
- Josh McKenzie as Joey Kovac
- Megan Hollier as Wanda Tsiolkas
- Steve Le Marquand as Mal Adcock
- Gerald Lepkowski as Chris Moore
- Lila McGuire as Alice Jinx

=== Season 3: Cape Rock Killer ===
- Danielle Cormack as Gabe Nicholls
- Eryn Jean Norvill as Amanda Taylor
- Sarah Peirse as Beth Chaplin
- Bessie Holland as Camilla Jones
- Nathalie Morris as Jazmyn Tanner
- William Zappa as Alan Chaplan
- Ewen Leslie as Andrew Retsis
- Phoenix Raei as Bassam Aziz
- Paul Tassone as Blake Gibson
- Hayley McElhinney as Marilyn Thorne
- John Bell as Edward John Dallimore
- Tracy Mann as Judge West
- Bruce Spence as Goran Popovich

== Episodes ==
Series	Episodes	Originally released	
Series	Episodes	First released	Last released
1	10	21 June 2022	9 August 2022
2	8	11 July 2024	29 August 2024
3	8	4 August 2025	22 September 2025

=== Season 1 (2022) ===
No. overall	No. in series	Title	Directed by	Written by	Original release date	Aus. viewers
1	1	"Episode 1"	Daniel Nettheim	Sarah Walker	21 June 2022	37,000
2	2	"Episode 2"	Daniel Nettheim	Bradford Winters	28 June 2022	56,000
3	3	"Episode 3"	Greg McLean	Leah Purcell	5 July 2022	51,000
4	4	"Episode 4"	Greg McLean	Anchuli Felicia King	12 July 2022	46,000
5	5	"Episode 5"	Catherine Millar	Tommy Murphy	19 July 2022	62,000
6	6	"Episode 6"	Catherine Millar	Greg Waters	26 July 2022	66,000
7	7	"Episode 7"	Sian Davies	Leah Purcell	2 August 2022	62,000
8	8	"Episode 8"	Sian Davies	Anchuli Felicia King	9 August 2022	47,000
9	9	"Episode 9"	Daniel Nettheim	Sarah Walker	16 August 2022	70,000
10	10	"Episode 10"	Daniel Nettheim	Sarah Walker	23 August 2022	82,000

=== Season 2 (2024) ===
No. overall	No. in series	Title	Directed by	Written by	Original release date	Aus. viewers
11	1	"Episode 1"	Stevie Cruz-Martin	Sarah L. Walker; Story by : Andrew Anastasios & Anna Barnes & Anya Beyersdorf & Anchuli Felicia King	11 July 2024	N/A
12	2	"Episode 2"	Stevie Cruz-Martin	Sarah L. Walker; Story by : Andrew Anastasios & Anchuli Felicia King & Anna Barnes & Anya Beyersdorf	18 July 2024	N/A
13	3	"Episode 3"	Mark Joffe	Anchuli Felicia King; Story by : Andrew Anastasios & Anna Barnes & Anya Beyersdorf & Sarah L. Walker	25 July 2024	N/A
14	4	"Episode 4"	Mark Joffe	Anya Beyersdorf; Story by : Andrew Anastasios & Anchuli Felicia Kin & Anna Barnes & Sarah L. Walker	1 August 2024	N/A
15	5	"Episode 5"	Emma Jackson	Anna Barnes; Story by : Andrew Anastasios & Anchuli Felicia Kin & Anya Beyersdorf & Sarah L. Walker	8 August 2024	N/A
16	6	"Episode 6"	Ben Young	Sarah L. Walker; Story by : Andrew Anastasios & Anchuli Felicia King & Anna Barnes & Anya Beyersdorf	15 August 2024	N/A
17	7	"Episode 7"	Ben Young	Anchuli Felicia King; Story by : Andrew Anastasios & Anna Barnes & Anya Beyersdorf & Sarah L. Walker	22 August 2024	N/A
18	8	"Episode 8"	Ben Young	Sarah L. Walker; Story by : Andrew Anastasios & Anchuli Felicia King & Anna Barnes & Anya Beyersdorf	29 August 2024	N/A

=== Season 3 (2025) ===
No. overall	No. in series	Title	Directed by	Written by	Original release date	Aus. viewers
19	1	"Episode 1"	Madeline Gottlieb	Sarah L. Walker; Story by : Matt Cameron & Hugo Johnstone-Burt & Mia Lethbrige & Sam Meikle & Adele Vuko	4 August 2025	N/A
20	2	"Episode 2"	Madeline Gottlieb	Sarah L. Walker; Story by : Matt Cameron & Hugo Johnstone-Burt & Mia Lethbrige & Sam Meikle & Adele Vuko	11 August 2025	N/A
21	3	"Episode 3"	Madeline Gottlieb	Sam Meikle; Story by : Matt Cameron & Hugo Johnstone-Burt & Mia Lethbrige & Adele Vuko & Sarah L. Walker	18 August 2025	N/A
22	4	"Episode 4"	Madeline Gottlieb	Matt Cameron; Story by : Hugo Johnstone-Burt & Mia Lethbrige & Sam Meikle & Adele Vuko & Sarah L. Walker	25 August 2025	N/A
23	5	"Episode 5"	Emma Jackson	Mia Lethbrige; Story by : Matt Cameron & Hugo Johnstone-Burt & Sam Meikle & Adele Vuko & Sarah L. Walker	1 September 2025	N/A
24	6	"Episode 6"	Emma Jackson	Sarah L. Walker; Story by : Matt Cameron & Hugo Johnstone-Burt & Mia Lethbrige & Sam Meikle & Adele Vuko	8 September 2025	N/A
25	7	"Episode 7"	Madeline Gottlieb	Adele Vuko; Story by : Matt Cameron & Hugo Johnstone-Burt & Mia Lethbrige & Sam Meikle & Sarah L. Walker	15 September 2025	N/A
26	8	"Episode 8"	Madeline Gottlieb	Sarah L. Walker; Story by : Matt Cameron & Hugo Johnstone-Burt & Mia Lethbrige & Sam Meikle & Adele Vuko	22 September 2025	N/A

== Production ==
The series is produced by Ian Collie, Rob Gibson, and Ally Henville, with executive producers Michael Brooks, Hamish Lewis, and Liz Watts.

For the second season, production moved away from Sydney to Western Australia. Production of the third season remained in Western Australia.

== Broadcast ==
The first season premiered on Foxtel and Fox Showcase on 21 June 2022. The second season premiered on 11 July 2024. In September 2024, the series was renewed for a third season. The third season premiered on Binge on 4 August 2025.

== Reception ==
=== Critical reception ===
Reviews for The Twelve were generally positive. Prior to its premiere, David Knox of website TV Tonight rated the series at four out of five stars and praised both the adaptation and its cast, stating that "The Twelve has been entirely adapted for Australian audiences – and the results are quite fabulous." In a review from Wenlei Ma from news.com.au, she highly praised the production, commenting, "The performances and the writing are solid, the premise is compelling and the series itself has a lot of promise." Craig Mathieson of The Sydney Morning Herald gave the series three and a half stars, comparing the adaptation to the original Belgian series.

The series received a mixed reception in the UK. Rebecca Nicholson of The Guardian rated the series at 2 out of 5 stars, praising Sam Neill and Kate Mulvany's performances, but was highly critical of the show's storyline, commenting that "there is a sense of several soapy subplots bumping against each other, but never really gelling. You are left wanting to get back to the murder, which is the most straightforward part of the story. There is little in the did-she-do-it debate that sets it apart. The 12 aren’t really the focus here, then, and even actors as seasoned as Neill and Mulvany struggle to lift it beyond the realms of a functional thriller." In a review for the Evening Standard, Vicky Jessop give it 3 out of 5 stars, stating that "it’s fascinating stuff, in theory, but never gets enough time to breathe." She goes on to say "you can’t blame the show’s makers for wanting to spice up the court drama formula a little: we get so many that it can be hard to make them stand out, and this is a worthy attempt. But The Twelve ultimately fails to stick the landing. Crime lovers will find plenty to intrigue them; for the casual viewer, the jury’s very much out."

On the review aggregator website Rotten Tomatoes, 57% of critics' reviews are positive.

=== Ratings ===
==== Season 1 ====
No.	Title	Air date	Overnight ratings		Ref(s)
No.	Title	Air date	Viewers	Rank	Ref(s)
1	"Episode 1"	21 June 2022	37,000	9	
2	"Episode 2"	28 June 2022	56,000	3	
3	"Episode 3"	5 July 2022	51,000	2	
4	"Episode 4"	12 July 2022	46,000	4	
5	"Episode 5"	19 July 2022	62,000	1	
6	"Episode 6"	26 July 2022	66,000	2	
7	"Episode 7"	2 August 2022	62,000	1	
8	"Episode 8"	9 August 2022	47,000	3	
9	"Episode 9"	16 August 2022	70,000	1	
10	"Episode 10"	23 August 2022	82,000	1	

On average, the series had a viewership of 58,000, and ranked at #3.

== Awards and nominations ==
Year	Association	Category	Recipient	Result	Ref.
2022	AACTA Awards	Best Lead Actress in a Television Drama	Kate Mulvaney	Nominated	
2022	AACTA Awards	Best Lead Actor in a Television Drama	Sam Neill	Nominated	
2022	AACTA Awards	Best Guest or Supporting Actress in a Television Drama	Brooke Satchwell	Won	
2022	AACTA Awards	Best Guest or Supporting Actor in a Television Drama	Brendan Cowell	Nominated	
2022	AACTA Awards	Best Costume Design in Television	Xanthe Huebel (Episode 10)	Nominated	
2022	AACTA Awards	Best Direction in Drama or Comedy	Daniel Nettheim (Episode 10)	Nominated	
2022	AACTA Awards	Best Editing in Television	Mark Perry (Episode 10)	Nominated	
2022	AACTA Awards	Best Screenplay in Television	Sarah Walker (Episode 10)	Nominated	
2022	AACTA Awards	Best Casting Presented by Casting Networks	Kirsty McGregor	Won	
2022	AACTA Awards	Best Miniseries or Telefeature	Hamish Lewis; Ian Collie; Ally Henville; Rob Gibson; Michael Brooks	Won	
2022	AACTA Audience Choice Awards	Best Actor	Hazem Shammas	Nominated	
2022	Australian Directors' Guild Awards	Best Direction in a TV or SVOD Drama Series Episode	Sian Davies (Episode 8)	Nominated	
2022	Screen Music Awards	Best Music for a Mini-Series or Telemovie	Rafael May	Nominated	
2023	TV Tonight Awards	Best New Show (Aussie)	The Twelve	Nominated	
2023	Logie Awards	Most Popular Actor	Sam Neill	Won	
2023	Logie Awards	Most Outstanding Actor	Sam Neill	Nominated	
2023	Logie Awards	Most Outstanding Actress	Kate Mulvany	Nominated	
2023	Logie Awards	Most Outstanding Actress	Marta Dusseldorp	Nominated	
2023	Logie Awards	Most Outstanding Supporting Actor	Hamish Michael	Nominated	
2023	Logie Awards	Most Outstanding Supporting Actress	Brooke Satchwell	Nominated	
2023	Logie Awards	Most Outstanding Supporting Actress	Pallavi Sharda	Won	
2023	Logie Awards	Most Popular Drama Series, Miniseries or Telemovie	The Twelve	Nominated	
2023	Logie Awards	Most Outstanding Drama Series, Miniseries or Telemovie	The Twelve	Won	
2025	AACTA Awards	Best Lead Actor in a Drama	Sam Neill	Nominated	
2025	AACTA Awards	Best Drama Series	The Twelve	Nominated	
2025	AACTA Awards	Best Casting	The Twelve	Nominated	
2025	Logie Awards	Best Lead Actor in a Drama	Sam Neill	Won	
2025	Logie Awards	Best Drama Program	The Twelve	Nominated	
2026	AACTA Awards	Best Drama Series	The Twelve	Nominated	
2026	AACTA Awards	Best Lead Actor in a Drama	Sam Neill	Nominated	
2026	AACTA Awards	Best Direction in a Drama or Comedy	The Twelve: Episode 1 Madeleine Gottlieb	Nominated	
2026	AACTA Awards	Best Screenplay in Television	The Twelve: Episode 1 Sarah L. Walker	Nominated	
2026	AACTA Awards	Best Sound in Television	The Twelve: Episode 1	Nominated	
2026	Logie Awards	Best Lead Actor in a Drama	Sam Neill	Pending	
2026	Logie Awards	Best Drama Program	The Twelve	Pending	
