= Show Me the Movie! =

- Genre: Panel show; Comedy
- Created by: Ben Davies; Paul Clarke
- Presented by: Rove McManus
- Starring: Joel Creasey; Jane Harber (2018); Brooke Satchwell (2019)
- Opening theme: "Oh Yeah" by Yello (season 1)
- Country of origin: Australia
- Original language: English
- No. of seasons: 2
- No. of episodes: 16

Production
- Executive producers: Ben Davies; Paul Clarke; Paul Leadon
- Producers: Bryan Moses; Brooke Satchwell
- Production locations: Network 10 Studios, Sydney, New South Wales
- Running time: 60 minutes
- Production companies: Blink TV; Ronde Media

Original release
- Network: Network 10
- Release: 22 March 2018 – 28 March 2019

Show Me the Movie! was a weekly Australian television comedy panel show, which premiered on Network 10 on 22 March 2018 and ran until 28 March 2019. The program was hosted by Rove McManus who, with team captains Joel Creasey, Jane Harber (2018) and Brooke Satchwell (2019), and a panel of actors, comedians and international guests, contested a series of rounds. The title was a play on the iconic movie line, "Show me the money," spoken by Tom Cruise in Jerry Maguire.

== Cast ==
- Rove McManus - Host
- Joel Creasey - Team Captain
- Jane Harber - Team Captain (2018)
- Brooke Satchwell - Team Captain (2019)

== Production ==
In May 2018, the series was renewed for a second season. Rove McManus returned as host, as did team captain Joel Creasey, with newcomer Brooke Satchwell as the other captain. Season 2 premiered on 8 February 2019.

== Episodes ==
Series	Episodes	Originally released	
Series	Episodes	First released	Last released
1	8	22 March 2018	10 May 2018
2	8	8 February 2019	28 March 2019

=== Season 1 (2018) ===
No. overall	No. in season	Team Joel	Team Jane	Original release date	Australian viewers
1	1	Frank Woodley & Angela Bishop	Paul Mercurio & Tegan Higginbotham	22 March 2018	576,000
Celebrity Interview: Scott Eastwood
2	2	David Collins & Kerry Armstrong	Ryan Johnson & Shane Dundas	29 March 2018	401,000
Celebrity Interview: Elizabeth Debicki & Margot Robbie
3	3	Merrick Watts & Shari Sebbens	Nicholas Hammond & Cal Wilson	5 April 2018	386,000
4	4	Sam Simmons & Michala Banas	Kevin Harrington & Chrissie Swan	12 April 2018	392,000
5	5	Tahir Bilgiç & Lucy Durack	Angela Bishop & Jason Byrne	19 April 2018	429,000
6	6	Stephen K. Amos & Jess Harris	Hunter Page-Lochard & Amanda Keller	26 April 2018	376,000
Celebrity Interview: Ioan Gruffudd
7	7	Charlie Pickering & Madeleine West	Damian Walshe-Howling & Tegan Higginbotham	3 May 2018	382,000
Celebrity Interview: Jack Thompson
8	8	Eddie Perfect & Natalie Bassingthwaighte	Gyton Grantley & Fiona O'Loughlin	10 May 2018	454,000
Celebrity Interview: Melissa McCarthy & Ben Falcone

=== Season 2 (2019) ===
No. overall	No. in season	Team Joel	Team Brooke	Original release date	Australian viewers
9	1	Tiriel Mora & Kate McCartney	Dave Thornton & Nikki Osborne	8 February 2019	304,000
Celebrity Guests: Lucy Durack, Jeremy Brennan & Nigel Christensen
10	2	Mark Humphries & Jess Harris	Nath Valvo & Pia Miranda	15 February 2019	218,000
11	3	Merrick Watts & Angela Bishop	Colin Gibson & Tom Ballard	21 February 2019	289,000
Celebrity Guests: Antoinette Halloran, Jeremy Brennan & Nigel Christensen
12	4	Peter Helliar & Annie Maynard	Georgie Carroll & Luke McGregor	28 February 2019	341,000
13	5	Mel Buttle & Tasma Walton	Lloyd Langford & Mark Humphries	7 March 2019	343,000
Celebrity Guests: Casey Donovan, Jeremy Brennan & Nigel Christensen
14	6	Colin Lane & Gen Fricker	Anne Edmonds & Charlie Pickering	14 March 2019	326,000
15	7	Peter Rowsthorn & Angela Bishop	Ivan Aristeguieta & Dave O'Neil	21 March 2019	306,000
Celebrity Guests: Nigel Christensen, Bob Downe & Jeremy Brennan
16	8	Tom Gleeson & Don Hany	Nikki Osborne & Merrick Watts	28 March 2019	307,000
Celebrity Guests: Bruce Spence, Ella Hooper & Jeremy Brennan
