= Pallavi Sharda =

Australian actress (born 1992)

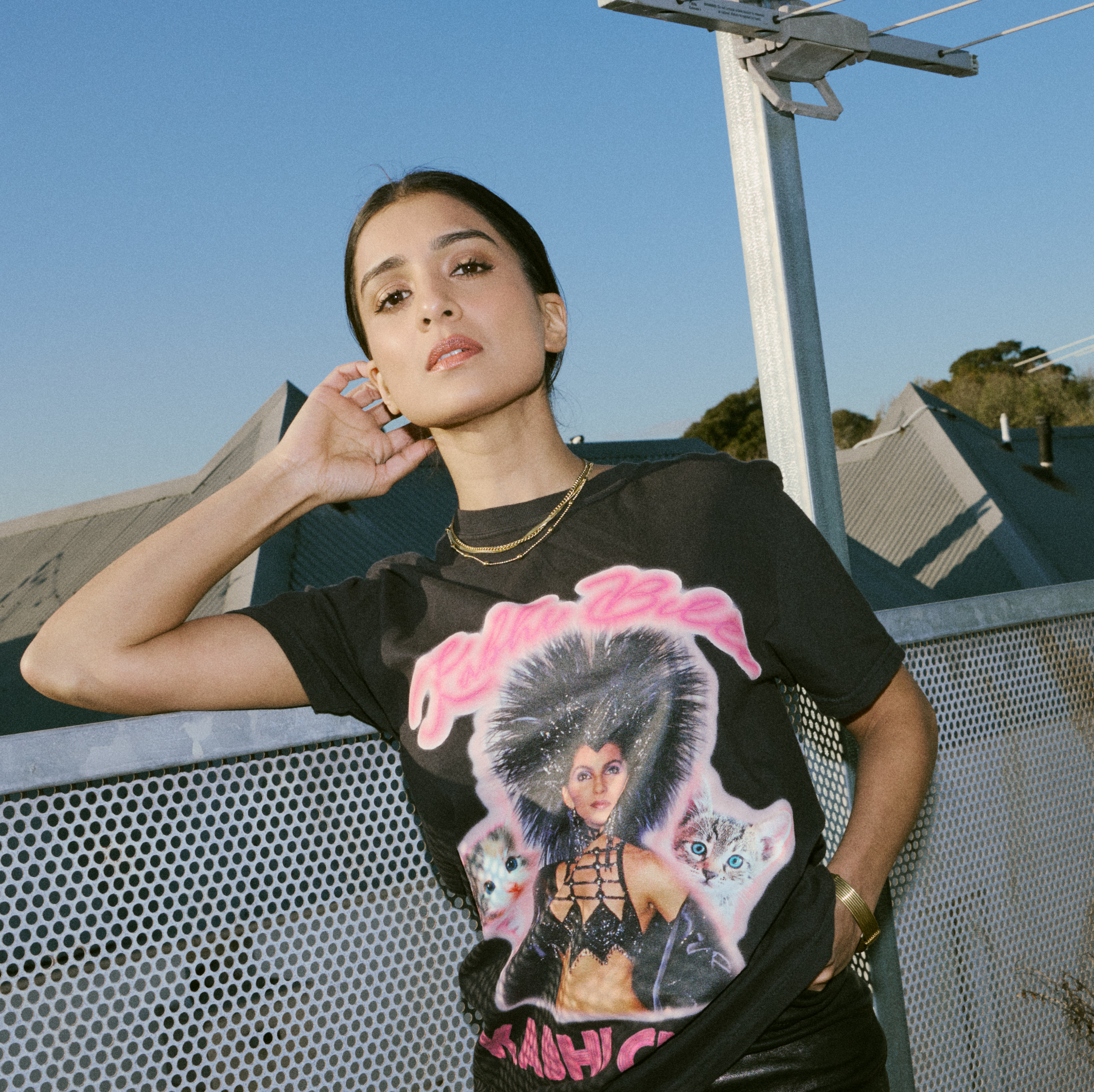
- Sharda in 2025
- Born: 5 March 1992 (age 34); Perth, Western Australia, Australia
- Occupation: Actress
- Years active: 2008–present
- Title: Miss India Australia 2010

Pallavi Sharda (born 5 March 1992 in Perth, Western Australia) is an Australian actress and Bharathanatyam dancer who works primarily in Indian and Australian cinema and television industry. She is best known for her role in the Netflix Rom-Com Wedding Season (2022). She has also starred in Hindi-language films Besharam (2013), Hawaizaada (2015), and Begum Jaan (2017). She starred in the 2012 Australian film Save Your Legs! and the 2019 TV series Les Norton. Sharda starred in Tom & Jerry, The Twelve, and the Academy Award-nominated film Lion (2016).

Beyond acting, Sharda has been involved in philanthropy and cultural advocacy, serving on the board of Screen Australia, acting as an ambassador for organisations such as World Vision Australia and the Ovarian Cancer Research Foundation through the Witchery White Shirt campaign, and partnering with social enterprises like Dharma Life and E-Kutir to support women in rural India.

== Early life and education ==
Pallavi Sharda was born on 5 March 1992 in Perth, Western Australia. Her mother, Hema Sharda, has a PhD in microelectronics, and her father, Nalin Sharda has a PhD in information technology, and both are professors. They migrated to Australia in the early 1980s, soon after the birth of Pallavi's elder brother.

Sharda moved to Melbourne as a toddler, where she grew up in the outer north-western suburbs.

She went to school at Lowther Hall in Essendon, where she obtained an academic scholarship and at the age of 16 commenced her LLB and BA (Media & Communications) and Diploma in Modern Languages (French) at the University of Melbourne, graduating with honours at 21. The title of her dissertation was "Representation of cross-cultural communities in Australian media", in which she looked at the work of the British Indian film director Gurinder Chadha, "one of the pioneering women of colour in the 1990s in Britain".

She trained for many years in Bharatanatyam, a classical Indian dance form, and also learnt some Odissi dance.

== Career ==
=== Screen ===
Sharda moved from Melbourne to Mumbai around 2008-2010 to follow a career in film. She started her career by playing a cameo in Karan Johar's My Name Is Khan, released in 2010.

She next starred in the comedy drama film, Dus Tola (2010) opposite acclaimed actor Manoj Bajpayee, in which she played the role of Geeta, a village dance teacher. Sharda's performance was considered the best element of the film by The Times of India. In 2011 and 2012 Sharda was the lead actress of the theatrical musical, Taj Express directed by Shruti Merchant and choreographed by Vaibhavi Merchant.

Sharda made her Australian film debut with comedy film Save Your Legs, which released on 28 February 2013. She was selected through an audition process in India when producers travelled there to find an Indian actress who could convincingly play an Australian. She then appeared in Abhinav Kashyap's Bollywood film Besharam, a breakthrough performance opposite Ranbir Kapoor, in which she portrayed a woman whose car is stolen by a petty thief.

Sharda's next Bollywood venture, Hawaizaada, was released worldwide on 30 January 2015. Directed by Vibhu Puri and co-starring Ayushmann Khurrana and Mithun Chakraborty, the film is inspired by the true events of Shivkar Bapuji Talpade, who is believed to have flown an unmanned aircraft in 1895 Bombay. Sharda received critical acclaim for her portrayal of a courtesan dancer during the British Raj era in Mumbai.

Sharda joined Dev Patel and Nicole Kidman in the Hollywood film Lion in 2016. The film premiered at the Toronto International Film Festival, where she played the role of Prama. Her next Bollywood film, Begum Jaan, released in April 2017. Sharda received critical acclaim for her authenticity in the portrayal of Gulabo, a sex worker in rural Punjab, at the time of Pakistan's partition from India.

Sharda played a leading role in ABC Television's medical drama Pulse (2017), which earned her the Casting Guild of Australia's "Rising Star" award. She played in the ABC-TV series Les Norton in 2019, performing opposite David Wenham as Georgie Burman, a spunky and pragmatic casino manager.

In 2020, she starred in Beecham House, ITV's historical drama series directed by Gurinder Chadha, the British Indian director whose work she wrote about in her dissertation at university. In July of the same year, she starred in ABC TV's Retrograde, a six-part dramedy about life for a group of young people during the COVID-19 pandemic in Australia.

In 2021, Sharda appeared as Megan Chapman in the British Netflix drama The One. That same year, she featured in the live-action film Tom & Jerry, alongside Chloë Grace Moretz, Michael Peña, and Colin Jost.

In 2022, Sharda starred as Asha in the Netflix romantic comedy Wedding Season, opposite Suraj Sharma. Directed by Tom Dey and produced by Imagine Entertainment, Jax Media, and Swati Shetty, the film follows two Indian-Americans who pretend to date during wedding season before developing a genuine relationship.

In 2022 she starred in the Australian award-winning drama The Twelve opposite Sam Neill. This garnered her a Logie nomination for Most outstanding supporting actress for her portrayal of 24 year old Corrie D'Souza – a head juror marred by her own story of PTSD in 2023.

In 2024, Sharda was cast in two Australian comedy films. SPIT, which released theatrically in March 2025, features Sharda as Aria Sahni, a lawyer known for her unconventional methods. One More Shot premiered on Stan in October 2025, following screenings at SXSW Austin, its Australian premiere, and the Melbourne International Film Festival.

=== Audio ===
Sharda starred in the Audible original podcast The Missed, written by Sami Shah and released in August 2022.

== Other activities ==
Sharda joined Sony ESPN's team as their new face for the IPL 2016 Indian Premier League (IPL).

As of 2016 Sharda was on the board of advisers for the social enterprise eKutir, an organisation focuses on rural development projects across sanitation, nutrition, and sustainable agriculture, located in the state of Odissa in eastern India, founded by KC Mishra. She was the ambassador of a sanitation project called Svadha, and encouraged Australians to donate to the cause. She worked with eKutir for several years.

In 2017 she was writing a memoir called Which Way to Bombay?, due to be published in 2018.

In 2023, she was appointed to the Screen Australia board, becoming the youngest member ever and first of Indian origin. She also partnered with World Vision Australia alongside other notable Australian women activists to raise her voices to empower 1,000 girls.

In 2024 she became an ambassador of the Witchery White Shirt campaign, to help raise awareness for Ovarian Cancer Research.

In 2024, Sharda founded Bodhini Studios, a production initiative focused on intercultural storytelling, with an emphasis on cultural safety and addressing barriers within mainstream screen culture.

In 2025, Sharda began working with Dharma Life, a social enterprise based in India, talking with women social entrepreneurs in the mountainous state of Uttarakhand in northern India.

She has been a regular keynote speaker on Asia Literacy in Australia, cross-cultural relations between India and Australia, and women's empowerment in India. She has delivered talks at forums including the Australia India Leadership Dialogue (AILD) in Melbourne, where she spoke about the role of culture and technology in strengthening bilateral ties and highlighted cultural diplomacy as a form of soft power.

== Recognition and honours ==
Sharda was crowned Miss India Australia in Sydney in 2010.

In 2015 she was appointed the "Queen of Moomba", Melbourne's largest community festival, alongside retired Australian cricketer Shane Warne.

In 2020, Sharda was named on the list of 40 forty most influential Asian Australians at the inaugural Asian-Australian Leadership Summit.

== Awards and nominations ==
Year	Award	Category	Work	Result
2021	Equity Ensemble Awards	Most Outstanding Performance by an Ensemble in a Comedy Series (with Maria Angelico, Nicholas Boshier, Max Brown, Esther Hannaford & Ilai Swindells)	Retrograde	Won

== Filmography ==
=== Film ===
Year	Title	Role	Notes
2010	My Name Is Khan	Sajida Siddiqi	
2010	Dus Tola	Geeta	
2010	Walkaway	Sia	
2011	The Saviour	Pia	Short film
2011	Love Breakups Zindagi	Radhika	
2012	Save Your Legs!	Anjali	
2012	Heroine	Gayatri	
2013	Besharam	Tara Sharma	
2015	Hawaizaada	Sitara	
2015	UnIndian	Shanthi	
2016	Lion	Prama	
2017	Begum Jaan	Gulabo	
2018	Hotel Mumbai	News Voiceover	Voice role
2018	Murder	Dr. Parvati Agrawal	TV film
2021	Tom & Jerry: The Movie	Preeta Mehta	
2022	Wedding Season	Asha	

=== Television ===
Year	Title	Role	Notes
2010	Comedy Circus Ka Jadoo		Episode: "Uniform Special"
2017	Pulse	Tanya Kalchuri	Series regular, 8 episodes
2019	Strike Back	Samira Shah	Episode: "Revolution: Part 3"
2019	Beecham House	Chandrika	Series regular, 6 episodes
2019	Les Norton	Georgie Burman	Mini-series
2020	Retrograde	Maddie	Series regular, 6 episodes
2021	The One	Megan Chapman	Series regular, 7 episodes
2022	The Twelve	Corrie D'Souza	TV series: 10 episodes
2024	The Office	Alisha Khanna	Series regular

== See also ==
- Zumba Dance Fitness Party
- Indian Australians
