= Ponmuttayidunna Tharavu =

- Poster
- Directed by: Sathyan Anthikad
- Written by: Raghunath Paleri
- Produced by: B. Sasikumar
- Starring: Sreenivasan; Jayaram; Urvashi; Shari; Innocent; Parvathy
- Cinematography: Vipin Mohan
- Edited by: K. Rajagopal
- Music by: Johnson
- Production company: Mudra Productions
- Distributed by: Mudra Arts
- Release date: 28 December 1988
- Running time: 122 minutes
- Country: India
- Language: Malayalam

Ponmuttayidunna Tharavu (The Goose that lays Golden Eggs) is a 1988 Indian Malayalam-language romantic comedy-drama film, written by Raghunath Paleri and directed by Sathyan Anthikad. It stars Sreenivasan, Jayaram, Urvashi, and Innocent in the lead roles. It was Sreenivasan's first role as a hero after Sanghaganam (1979). The film was remade in Hindi in 2010 as Dus Tola.

== Plot ==
Bhaskaran, the local village goldsmith, is in love with Snehalatha, the daughter of P. V. Panicker, the local astrologer, his neighbour. Panicker wants his daughter to marry a rich man working in the Persian Gulf region. When Bhaskaran proposes to Snehalatha, Snehalatha asks for a gold necklace made of ten sovereigns as a symbol of Bhaskaran's love and also to impress her father. Bhaskaran makes a necklace and hands it over to Snehalatha. An angry Panicker finds this out, admonishes her, and pockets the golden necklace. He states that Bhaskaran has given the necklace to his daughter as a token of "brotherly love".

Panicker receives a marriage proposal from Pavithran who is an orphan and is working in Qatar and accepts it. A few days before the marriage, Panicker walks up to the tea shop where the regular patrons are in attendance. There, he shows a golden necklace saying that he purchased it from a nearby town and that it was a gift from him to his daughter. The village crowd appreciates Panicker's fatherly love. Bhaskaran finds out that it is the same necklace he had given to Snehalatha a few days back.

Bhaskaran becomes impatient and finally decides to march to Panicker's home and ask Snehalatha to marry him. In this daring mission, he is accompanied by his friends and well-wishers, namely the Velichappadu an oracle, Pappi the cattle trader, Aboobacker the tea-shop owner, and Hajiyar. Madhavan Nair, an elderly respectable citizen of the village also joins in. Bhaskaran's parents also join in. A heated argument ensues at Panicker's household. Snehalatha denies any love affair with Bhaskaran, and Panicker refuses to return the golden necklace. Panicker argues that such a golden necklace was never given by Bhaskaran.

Bhaskaran soon becomes the joke of the village, with people saying that he was a fool to give the necklace (if such a thing existed), without any guarantee or surety. Life goes on in the village. Parvathy teaches classical dance on the second floor of Aboobacker's dilapidated tea shop. Aboobacker and Pappi tries to oust Parvathy as the dance damages his shop but she refuses to vacate. Pappi continues to buy and sell livestock, and Madhavan Nair makes his routine night visits to the village prostitute, Devayani. The Velichappadu is busy organising the local temple festival. Supported by his friends especially Hajiyar, Bhaskaran starts a small jewelry shop (Bhaskaran & Sons) in the village.

Pavithran marries Snehalatha and returns to the Middle East. Snehalatha is pregnant and she comes back to her house for delivery. Soon the baby girl is born, and Pavithran also comes back. To the shock of the Panicker family, Pavithran says he is not planning to go back and plans to buy a few trucks and settle down in Kerala. His job abroad was not good, and he even spent some time in jail there.

Pavithran invites Bhaskaran to pierce his child's ear but Bhaskaran gets insulted by Snehalatha, Panicker and her mother stating that he is not good at his work, and that it may harm the baby. When Bhaskaran overheard this conversation, he becomes very sad and leaves. Although Pavithran tries to stop Bhaskaran he refuses and leaves with an emotional note that when a Goldsmith pierced an ear of a baby, it's the Goldsmith who is affected the most from the pain suffered by the baby and that they shouldn't have spread false information about him.

Meanwhile, Parvathy Teacher approaches Bhaskaran for financial help to treat her father but Bhaskaran has insufficient funds whereby he arranges funds from Hajiyar. When Parvathy Teacher says that she won't forget this help, Bhaskaran grieving from his past circumstances instructs Parvathy Teacher to forget the help and that he no longer does any help worthy of remembering. Pavithran is in need of more funds to finance his truck. It is at this moment that Snehalatha realises that Pavithran was a truck driver and he lost his job in Gulf even spending time behind bars. He notices the gold necklace his wife regularly adorned herself with, which she boasts of being worth ten sovereigns. Pavithran sees a used truck in good condition and makes plan to sell Snehalatha's necklace and raise funds for his truck. He even promises to buy Snehalatha a new chain after the truck fetches profit. Although Snehalatha refuses to give it stating it's her father's gift, Pavithran takes it from her to pawn it for some quick money.

Pavithran consults Bhaskaran as he is the village goldsmith. Bhaskaran checks the necklace and confirms whether the necklace was given to him by Panicker. Meanwhile, Velichappadu and Madhavan Nair comes to Bhaskaran for donation to temple. And when his regular friends have gathered in the village square, Bhaskaran declares that the necklace is made of copper, containing very little gold.He even adds that he would've been incarcerated if he took the necklace for sale in town believing Pavithran. Pavithran now humiliated, with his wife and kid, storms into Panicker's home. He feels that he has been shortchanged, and Snehalatha was not true to him. Panicker is forced to admit that this necklace was not something which he purchased but was given by Bhaskaran to Snehalatha some years back. The love affair of Snehalatha and Bhaskaran also now comes out in the open. This irritates Pavithran even further as he now feels everyone is tricking him. Pavithran asks whether he was cheated by Bhaskaran or Snehalata for which Panicker replies Bhaskaran. The villagers too take up sides, and a huge fight ensues.

During the fight Paappi goes to Hajiyar's house and informs that Hajiyar is being beaten to pulp. Hearing this Hajiyar's Wife Khalmayi rushes to spot and as in any typical village, the fight soon stops when everyone sees Hajiyar's Wife for first time, and everything returns to normal. When asked by Bhaskaran's father as to who gave him the idea to mix copper with gold, Bhaskaran replies that he learned the idea from his father, who used to fool his wife by polishing copper with gold. Pavithran finally decides to take back Snehalatha and daughter. The movie ends with a note which indicates that Bhaskaran too has found his true love in the dance teacher, Parvathi and that she is the real gold.

== Cast ==
- Sreenivasan as Thattan Bhaskharan
- Urvashi as Snehalatha
- Jayaram as Pavithran
- Shari as Parvathi
- Innocent as P. V. Panicker
- K. P. A. C. Lalitha as Bhagiradhi
- Jagathi Sreekumar as the Velichappadu
- Oduvil Unnikrishnan as Pappi
- Sankaradi as Madhavan Nair
- Karamana Janardanan Nair as Hajiyar
- Krishnan Kutty Nair as Thattan Gopalan
- Mamukkoya as Aboobakkar
- Philomina as Bhaskaran's mother
- Shyama as Savithri
- Aloor Elsy as Devayani
- Parvathy as Khalmayi, Hajiyar's wife (Cameo)

== Soundtrack ==
The music was composed by Johnson with lyrics by O. N. V. Kurup.

No.	Song	Singers	Lyrics	Length (m:ss)
1	"Kunnimani Cheppu"	K. S. Chithra	O. N. V. Kurup	4:27
2	"Theeyilurukki"	K. J. Yesudas	O. N. V. Kurup	. 4:46

== Awards ==
Filmfare Awards South

- Filmfare Award for Best Actress - Urvashi

== Trivia ==
- This movie was initially titled Ponmutta Idunna Thattaan(പൊന്മുട്ടയിടുന്ന തട്ടാൻ) (the goldsmith who lays the golden eggs). This was later changed after severe protests from the goldsmith community in Kerala.
- This movie was shot in a village called Thanneercode (തണ്ണീർക്കോട്) near Thrithala (തൃത്താല) in Palakkad District of Kerala.
- This film was remade in Hindi as Dus Tola. starring Manoj Bajpai in Sreenivasan's role. This film is distributed by Warner Bros.
