= The Year of Freaking Out =

Book by Sarah Walker

- Author: Sarah Walker
- Language: English
- Genre: young adult, lesbian
- Publisher: Pan Macmillan Australia
- Publication date: 1997
- Publication place: Australia
- Media type: Print (Paperback)
- Pages: 230 pages (first edition, hardback)
- ISBN: 0-330-35972-X (first edition, paperback)
- OCLC: 38407159

The Year of Freaking Out is a 1997 Australian young adult novel by Sarah Walker about 17-year-old Kim, her relationship with her childhood friend Matthew and her passionate friendship with the new girl at school, Rachel.

== Reception ==
Lucy Lehmann of The Sydney Morning Herald wrote: "So many exciting things happened while the reader wasn't around, that I began to feel that I had missed out on all the action." Thuy On of The Age opined that the novel "fails to move beyond a cossetted, cotton-woolled world; it deals more with internal sexual tension than critical external ones."
