= On the Ropes (TV series) =

- Genre: Drama
- Created by: Courtney Wise
- Written by: Tamara Asmar; Adam Todd; Ian Meadows
- Directed by: Shannon Murphy
- Starring: Nicole Chamoun; Igal Naor; Keisha Castle-Hughes
- Country of origin: Australia
- Original language: English
- No. of series: 1
- No. of episodes: 4

Production
- Executive producers: Sue Masters; Jason Stephens; Jacobs Media; Matthew Rodriguez
- Producers: Helen Bowden; Courtney Wise
- Production company: Lingo Pictures

Original release
- Network: SBS
- Release: 28 November – 19 December 2018

On the Ropes is an Australian drama series which screened on SBS on 28 November 2018. The four-part miniseries follows a young Iraqi-Australian woman who follows her dream of becoming an elite women's boxing trainer. Production for the series began in May 2018.

== Synopsis ==
Amirah Al-Amir (Nicole Chamoun) is an aspiring Iraqi-Australian boxing trainer who often has to deal with the physicality and deep-seated culture of misogyny in the sporting world. She works in the family gym in Sydney's western suburbs with world champion father Sami (Igal Naor) and her two brothers.

Amirah secures a debut professional match for her hard-nosed fighter Jess Connor with the help of Strick, Sami's long-time promoter. Her father is furious that she went behind his back and threatens to cut her off.

== Episodes ==
| No. in season | Title | Directed by | Written by | Original release date |
|---|---|---|---|---|
| 1 | "The Fire" | Shannon Murphy | Tamara Asmar | 28 November 2018 |
Aspiring trainer Amirah Al Amir (Nicole Chamoun) deceives her boxing champion father, Sami Al Amir (Igal Naor), in order to secure her female athlete Jess Connor (Keisha Castle-Hughes), a pro debut fight. Fearing for Jess's safety, Sami intervenes and stops the fight, despite Amirah's continued reassurance that she has it under control. In his haste, Sami hits an official, threatening his boxing licence and livelihood.
| 2 | "No Returns" | Shannon Murphy | Adam Todd | 5 December 2018 |
Without the security of her family's gym and home, Amirah sleeps in her car. She struggles to find a space to train her female fighters. In attempt to drive her to come home, Sami cuts her wage.
| 3 | "In Fighting" | Shannon Murphy | Adam Todd | 12 December 2018 |
Amirah makes the decision to tell the truth at her father's tribunal, despite the repercussions threatening to affect their relationship and cause further rifts with her family. Emotions heat up between Amirah and Lachy, even though she has reservations about her feelings towards him. Amirah actions much needed damage control when she gives her youngest boxer, Mina, wrong advice that could potentially stop her training for good.
| 4 | "The Truth" | Shannon Murphy | Ian Meadows | 19 December 2018 |
Amirah prepares for her biggest fight yet — against her father — as she trains Lachy to challenge her brother in the ring. Amirah is determined to prove to Sami she belongs in the boxing world and knows it will take defeating him to do so. Jess hopes to redeem herself in a rematch against the formidable Jinx and while Lachy hopes to make it two from two in his second ever boxing match, he is also concerned Amirah is taking her personal issues with her father into the ring.

== Cast ==
- Nicole Chamoun as Amirah Al-Amir
- Igal Naor as Sami Al-Amir
- Keisha Castle-Hughes as Jessica Connor
- Jack Thompson as Strick
- Louis Hunter as Lachy
- Tyler De Nawi as Hayder Al-Amir
- Neveen Hanna as Layla Al-Amir
- Claude Jabbour as Tariq Al-Amir
- Setareh Naghoni as Ranya
- Priscilla Doueihy as Amal
- Marlee Barber as Jacinda Jinx Katz
- Otis Dhanji as Iggy
- Michael Denkha as Ahmad
- Bozana Diab as Mina
- Nader Hamden as Ben
- Wendy Strehlow as Gloria

== Awards and nominations ==
The series was nominated for three Logie Awards in 2019; Most Outstanding Miniseries / Telemovie, Most Outstanding Lead Actress (Nicole Chamoun) and Most Outstanding Supporting Actress (Keisha Castle-Hughes). It was also nominated for a 2019 Director's Guild Award for Shannon Murphy, a 2019 Actor's Equity Award for the ensemble cast and a 2019 Writer's Guild Award for Best Miniseries. It is nominated for a 2019 AACTA Award for Best Telefeature or Miniseries.

== See also ==
- List of Australian television series
- List of programs broadcast by Special Broadcasting Service
