= Retrograde (TV series) =

- Genre: Comedy
- Created by: Mark O'Toole; Meg O'Connell
- Directed by: Natalie Bailey
- Country of origin: Australia
- Original language: English
- No. of series: 1
- No. of episodes: 6

Production
- Executive producers: Kurt Royan; Sally Riley; Que Minh Luu; Andrew Gregory
- Producers: Meg O’Connell; Dan Lake; Jackson Lapsley Scott
- Running time: 22 minutes
- Production companies: Unless Pictures & Orange Entertainment Co Production

Original release
- Network: ABC
- Release: 8 July – 12 August 2020

Retrograde is an Australian narrative comedy drama series which first screened on the ABC in July 2020.

== Synopsis ==
It follows the lives of a group of thirty-something friends as they drown their sorrows at a virtual bar during the COVID-19 pandemic in Australia.

== Cast ==
- Pallavi Sharda as Maddie
- Ilai Swindells as Ramsay
- Maria Angelico as Isabel
- Esther Hannaford as Sophie
- Nicholas Boshier as Dylan
- Max Brown as Rob

== Guest cast ==
- Ronny Chieng as Glen
- Shapoor Batliwalla as Dad
- Julian Haig as Hot Alan
- Luxy Mu as Maya

== Production ==
Retrograde is a six part series created by Mark O'Toole and Meg O'Connell and is directed by Natalie Bailey. The executive producer is Kurt Royan and producers are Meg O'Connell, Dan Lake, and Jackson Lapsley Scott. It is an Unless Pictures & Orange Entertainment Co production for the ABC.

The series was conceived of in the early stages of the COVID-19 pandemic in Australia, when O'Connell helped organise a virtual bar similar to the one featured in the show. She and Scott then pitched the idea to Que Minh Luu less than a week later, and the show began production.

The show was shot remotely via a series of Zoom calls between the producers, crew, and actors. Filming started in mid-June, just three weeks before its 8 July debut.

== Release ==
Retrograde premiered on ABC TV on 8 July 2020.

== Reception ==
The series was generally well-received by critics.

It won the Most Outstanding Performance by an Ensemble in a Comedy Series award in the 2021 Equity Ensemble Awards.

== See also ==
- At Home Alone Together
- Connecting... - a US sitcom with a similar premise, broadcast in autumn 2020
