= The Gloaming (TV series) =

Australian streaming television series

- Genre: Crime; Drama; Mystery; Supernatural; Thriller
- Created by: Victoria Madden
- Written by: Victoria Madden; Peter McKenna
- Directed by: Michael Rymer; Greg McLean; Sian Davies
- Starring: Emma Booth; Ewen Leslie; Aaron Pedersen; Anthony Phelan; Nicole Chamoun; Ditch Davey; Max Brown; Josephine Blazier; Matthew Testro; Markella Kavenagh; Zenia Starr; Rena Owen; Martin Henderson
- Theme music composer: Tori Amos
- Opening theme: "Silent All These Years" by Kat Leon
- Composers: Burkhard Dallwitz; Brett Aplin; Dmitri Golovko; Christian Scallan
- Country of origin: Australia
- Original language: English
- No. of seasons: 1
- No. of episodes: 8

Production
- Executive producers: Nick Forward; Keli Lee; Greg McLean; Jon Adgemis; Michael Gudinski
- Producers: John Molloy; Victoria Madden; Fiona McConaghy
- Cinematography: Marden Dean
- Camera setup: Single-camera
- Running time: 50–55 minutes
- Production companies: Sweet Potato Films; 2 Jons; ABC Studios International

Original release
- Network: Stan (Australia)
- Release: 1 January 2020

The Gloaming is an Australian supernatural thriller television series created by Victoria Madden that premiered on Stan on 1 January 2020. The series is set and filmed in Tasmania and stars Emma Booth and Ewen Leslie. On 9 May 2020, a second season was reported to be in development.

== Premise ==
The Gloaming is the story of an unorthodox and troubled police officer, Molly McGee, who leads an investigation into the murder of an unidentified woman. McGee has to team up with Alex O'Connell, a man she has not spoken to for 20 years. They discover that the murder has links to a cold case from the past, political corruption and occult practices.

== Cast ==
=== Main ===
- Emma Booth as Molly McGee
- Ewen Leslie as Alex O'Connell
  - Finn Ireland as Young Alex
- Aaron Pedersen as Inspector Lewis Grimshaw
- Anthony Phelan as William Fian
- Nicole Chamoun as Jacinta Clunes
- Ditch Davey as Toby Broomhall
- Max Brown as Oscar Wolfe
- Josephine Blazier as Lily Broomhall
- Matthew Testro as Freddie Hopkins
- Markella Kavenagh as Daisy Hart
- Zenia Starr as Freya Harris
- Rena Owen as Grace Cochran
- Martin Henderson as Gareth McAvaney

=== Recurring ===
- Ben Morton as Constable Francis
- Milly Alcock as Jenny McGinty
- Airlie Dodds as Stephanie McGinty
- Nell Feeney as Shelly Hopkins
- Anni Finsterer as Eileen McGinty
- Katherine Pearson as Georgia
- Lisa Gormley as Angela Broomhall
- Dushan Philips as Eric Fox
- Virginie Laverdure as Maggie Madden
- Coco Whelan as Valerie Gowdie
- Kris McQuade as Carrie Bennett
- Ratidzo Mambo as Adrienne
- Nathan Spencer as Ben O'Connell
- Susan Prior as Counsellor Susan Kelly

=== Guests ===
- Lani Tupu as Event MC
- Ling-Hsueh Tang as Lena Madison
- Louise Siversen as Minister Leonie Patrick

== Episodes ==
No.	Title	Directed by	Written by	Original release date
1	"The Dying of the Light"	Michael Rymer	Victoria Madden	1 January 2020
When a woman is found brutally murdered, evidence discovered at the scene links the murder to a 20-year-old unsolved crime. Detectives - and old flames - Molly McGee and Alex O'Connell are reunited after a long absence to solve the crime.
2	"Hell's Black Grammar"	Michael Rymer	Victoria Madden	1 January 2020
Devastated by Daisy's death, Molly discovers a mysterious symbol that ignites her desire to track down Freddie. Alex makes a traumatic visit to Jenny McGinty's mother, Eileen. A powerful cabal is funding a Councilor's election campaign in return for her influence in a business deal.
3	"The Casting of the Bones"	Greg McLean	Victoria Madden	1 January 2020
Molly' daughter, Lily, partakes in some risqué online activity, which Freddie manipulates in an act of revenge against Molly. Meanwhile, Molly's suspicions about Freddie's involvement in Dorothy Moxley's murder deepen.
4	"Black Winged Angels"	Greg McLean	Victoria Madden	1 January 2020
Freddie puts Lily's life in jeopardy, and Molly must race to save her as Freddie unravels. Meanwhile, Constable Freya Harris has been working on a tip-off that Gareth and Councilor Jacinta Clunes may be involved in some dodgy dealings.
5	"Beyond the Veil"	Sian Davies	Victoria Madden	1 January 2020
Molly hears of Jacinta Clunes's untimely death and is convinced that Gareth is behind the accident. Alex's interest in the convict Bible he found at Dorothy Moxley's house deepens.
6	"Heathen Dogs"	Sian Davies	Peter McKenna	1 January 2020
The investigation has a breakthrough when a woman called Marianne Gowdie is discovered to have the same blood disorder as Dorothy Moxley. A strange night with Gareth causes Alex to recall memories he's suppressed for years.
7	"The Mark of the Witch"	Greg McLean	Victoria Madden	1 January 2020
Blood samples found in Councilor Jacinta Clunes's car reveal a familial link to Dorothy Moxley. Alex brings Inspector Lewis to Grace's house to show him the bones he discovered, and learns that Lewis knows more than he's letting on.
8	"The Night of the Mothers"	Greg McLean	Victoria Madden	1 January 2020
The investigation comes to head while the mid-winter festival builds outside, as Gareth takes Molly hostage at knifepoint and Alex is captured by William and the Crofters.

== Production ==
The Gloaming was created by Victoria Madden and produced by Madden and John Molloy, in partnership with Disney Platform Distribution, the distributor outside of Australia.

== Release ==
In Australia, the series premiered on Stan on 1 January 2020.

In the United States the series debuted on Starz on 21 March 2021.
