= James Walker (television writer) =

- Born: 1973; Perth, Western Australia
- Died: 20 January 2015 (aged 41)
- Occupations: Journalist, Television writer
- Children: 2
- Writing career
- Years active: 2003–2015

James Walker (1973 – 20 January 2015) was an Australian television writer.

== Biography ==
A former journalist, he graduated from the Australian Film Television and Radio School and went to work as a researcher on McLeod's Daughters, working his way up to script editor and writer. He wrote, script edited and script produced episodes of Home and Away, and also wrote episodes of Wonderland, Sam Fox and Neighbours. Walker began writing scripts for Neighbours in 2012.

== Death ==
Walker fell into a diabetic coma on 11 January 2015. He died on 20 January. He is survived by his partner and two sons. Walker's Neighbours colleague Stephen Vagg commented "James was a superb writer, whose scripts were always full of energy, original touches and first rate dialogue. He was also an excellent script editor, who was a pleasure to work with. He loved working with the characters and world of Ramsay Street and will be much missed here." Fellow writer Sarah Walker (no relation) said James Walker was "indeed an excellent writer - with his funny, crisp dialogue - and he had a wonderful knack with defining unique characters."

== Select writing credits ==
- McLeod's Daughters – researcher (2005–06), script editor (2007–09), writer (2006–08)
- Master Raindrop (2008) – writer
- Home and Away (2002, 2008–14) – writer; also stints as script editor (2008–09) and script producer (2009–10)
- Wild Boys (2011) – writer
- Neighbours (2012–15) – writer; also script editor (2014–15)
- Sam Fox: Extreme Adventures (2014) – writer
- Wonderland (2013–15) – writer
