= Bad Mothers =

2019 Australian television series

- Genre: Drama
- Created by: Rachel Lang; Gavin Strawhan
- Written by: Rachel Lang; Gavin Strawhan; Sarah Walker; Tim Lee
- Starring: Melissa George; Tess Haubrich; Daniel MacPherson; Don Hany; Michala Banas; Steve Bastoni; Mandy McElhinney; Shalom Brune-Franklin; Jessica Tovey; Kate Lister
- Composer: Kyls Burtland
- Country of origin: Australia
- Original language: English
- No. of series: 1
- No. of episodes: 8

Production
- Executive producers: Chloe Rickard; Phil Lloyd; Rachel Lang; Gavin Strawhan
- Producers: Chloe Rickard; Steven Zanoski
- Cinematography: John Stokes
- Editors: Gabriel Dowrick; Geoff Hitchins; Peter Crombie
- Production companies: Jungle Entertainment; Filthy Productions

Original release
- Network: Nine Network
- Release: 18 February – 8 April 2019

Bad Mothers is an Australian television drama series that premiered on the Nine Network on 18 February 2019. The show centres on five women whose lives collide following a series of shocking events and learn that life can get a whole lot more complicated, outrageous and fun, than they ever imagined.

== Synopsis ==
Sarah's suburban bliss is destroyed when her husband has an affair with her best friend, Charlotte, head of the Bedford Mothers’ Club. Ousted from the snooty club, Sarah finds unexpected support among the titular Bad Mothers. The new friends exact revenge on Charlotte that leads to deadly results.

== Cast ==
- Melissa George as Charlotte
- Tess Haubrich as Sarah
- Daniel MacPherson as Anton
- Don Hany as Kyle
- Steve Bastoni as Tom
- Mandy McElhinney as Maddie
- Shalom Brune-Franklin as Bindy
- Jessica Tovey as Danielle
- Kate Lister as Phoebe
- Helen Thomson as Liz
- Toby Truslove as Detective Holland
- Eddie Baroo as Matt

== Episodes ==
No.	Title	Directed by	Written by	Original release date	Prod. code	Australian viewers
1	Episode 1	Geoff Bennett	Rachel Lang & Gavin Strawhan	February 18, 2019	332393-1	691,000
2	Episode 2	Geoff Bennett	Rachel Lang & Gavin Strawhan	February 25, 2019	332393-2	644,000
3	Episode 3	Sian Davies	Sarah Walker	March 4, 2019	332393-3	542,000
4	Episode 4	Sian Davies	Gavin Strawhan	March 11, 2019	332393-4	495,000
5	Episode 5	Catriona McKenzie	Rachel Lang & Tim Lee	March 18, 2019	332393-5	498,000
6	Episode 6	Catriona McKenzie	Rachel Lang	March 25, 2019	332393-6	480,000
7	Episode 7	Geoff Bennett	Gavin Strawhan	April 1, 2019	332393-7	538,000
8	Episode 8	Geoff Bennett	Rachel Lang & Gavin Strawhan	April 8, 2019	332393-8	605,000

== Ratings ==
Bad Mothers : AUS viewers per episode (thousands)

Season	Episode number							
Season	1	2	3	4	5	6	7	8
1	691	644	542	495	498	480	538	605

No.	Title	Air date	Overnight ratings		Consolidated ratings		Total viewers	Ref(s)
No.	Title	Air date	Viewers	Rank	Viewers	Rank	Total viewers	Ref(s)
1	Episode 1	18 February 2019	691,000	9	79,000	8	770,000	
2	Episode 2	25 February 2019	644,000	9	68,000	9	712,000	
3	Episode 3	4 March 2019	542,000	15	83,000	14	625,000	
4	Episode 4	11 March 2019	495,000	16	119,000	12	614,000	
5	Episode 5	18 March 2019	498,000	16	100,000	14	598,000	
6	Episode 6	25 March 2019	480,000	16	133,000	12	613,000	
7	Episode 7	1 April 2019	538,000	15	98,000	10	636,000	
8	Episode 8	8 April 2019	605,000	13	95,000	11	700,000	

== Adaptation ==
In September 2020, Jungle Entertainment announced they are in active development on creating an adaptation of the series for U.S. audiences.
