= Safe Harbour (TV series) =

Australian television series

- Genre: Thriller
- Written by: Belinda Chayko; Matt Cameron; Phil Enchelmaier
- Directed by: Glendyn Ivin
- Starring: Ewen Leslie; Leeanna Walsman; Joel Jackson; Phoebe Tonkin; Hazem Shammas; Nicole Chamoun; Robert Rabiah; Jacqueline McKenzie
- Composer: Stephen Rae
- Country of origin: Australia
- Original language: English
- No. of series: 1
- No. of episodes: 4

Production
- Executive producers: Belinda Chayko; Debbie Lee; Sue Masters
- Producer: Stephen Corvini
- Cinematography: Sam Chiplin
- Editor: Mark Atkin
- Running time: 60 minutes
- Production company: Matchbox Pictures

Original release
- Network: SBS
- Release: 7 March – 28 March 2018

Safe Harbour is a four-part Australian thriller drama series first broadcast on SBS on 7 March 2018. The series follows a group of friends who travel from Brisbane on a sailing holiday of a lifetime to Indonesia, who cross paths with a fishing boat overloaded with asylum seekers en route to Australia, which alters their lives forever.

== Production ==
It is made by Matchbox Pictures, directed by Glendyn Ivin and written by Belinda Chayko, Matt Cameron and Phil Enchelmaier, and based on an original idea of Enchelmaier and Simon Kennedy. The series was produced Stephen Corvini, with Sue Masters as executive producer.

== Release ==
The series was first broadcast in Australia on SBS on 7 March 2018.

Outside Australia, the series was made available for streaming on Hulu in the United States, and was broadcast on BBC Four in the United Kingdom from 2 February 2019. The series was released on Region 4 DVD on 18 April 2018. It aired on television in Ireland on RTÉ2 from July 2019.

== Reception ==
Luke Buckmaster of Guardian Australia described the series as "deeply compelling". Mama Mia's entertainment editor Laura Brodnik praised the series, claiming that it left viewers asking one nagging question: "What would you do?".

Wenlei Ma of news.com.au described the series as "unmissable", writing; "When Australian TV is seemingly filled, wall-to-wall, with one same-same reality franchise after another, it can be hard to find quality Australian stories that offer you something new. This is one, and you best not miss it."

== Awards ==
The show won an International Emmy in 2019 for Best TV Movie or Miniseries.

== Cast ==
- Ewen Leslie as Ryan Gallagher
- Leeanna Walsman as Bree Gallagher
- Joel Jackson as Damien Pascoe
- Jacqueline McKenzie as Helen Korczak
- Phoebe Tonkin as Olivia Gallagher
- Hazem Shammas as Ismail Al-Biyati
- Nicole Chamoun as Zahra Al-Biyati
- Robert Rabiah as Bilal Al-Biyati
- Yazeed Daher as Asad Al-Bayati
- Maha Riad as Yasmeen Al-Bayati
- Ella Macrokanis as Maddie Gallagher
- Callum Aston as Lachlan Gallagher
- Pacharo Mzembe as Matou
- Pip Miller as Graham Newland
- Susan Prior as Renee
- Damien Garvey as AFP Officer Wade
- Andrea Moor as AFP Officer Matera

== Episodes ==
No.	Title	Directed by	Written by	Original release date	Australian viewers
1	"Episode 1"	Glendyn Ivin	Belinda Chayko	7 March 2018	167,000
Close friends Ryan, Bree, Olivia, Damien and Helen are in the midst of a sailing holiday to Indonesia when they find a stranded fishing boat, overloaded with refugees, in waters just outside Australian territory. Initially reluctant to offer help beyond handing over their drinking water, captain Ryan takes a vote from his fellow passengers, and as a result, attempts towing the stranded vessel with their tiny cruiser. However, during the night the boat is cut loose by some unidentified person, leaving the refugees helpless in the midst of an oncoming storm. Flash forward to five years later, and Ryan finds himself in a taxi driven by Ismail, one of the refugees from the boat. Ryan invites Ismail's family for a barbecue the following Sunday, unaware that their youngest daughter died before their eventual rescue, and his wife blames the Australians.
2	"Episode 2"	Glendyn Ivin	Matt Cameron	14 March 2018	146,000
Ismail reports Ryan to the Australian Federal Police. As the five friends come under intense scrutiny, Damien refuses the right to counsel, while Helen manages to ensure that her interview is kept off the record. Communication between Ryan's daughter Maddie and Ismail's son Asad continues to grow, while Damien tries to settle matters outside the interview room, leading himself to become the victim of a harsh beating from Ismail's brother, Bilal. Although he decides not to report the assault to the police, Damien exacts revenge by informing Bilal's bosses of the incident, resulting in him losing his job.
3	"Episode 3"	Glendyn Ivin	Belinda Chayko & Phil Enchelmaier	21 March 2018	138,000
The AFP inform Ryan that will not face any charges. Damien is forced to admit that his reason for leaving shortly after the holiday was nothing to do with the incident itself, but instead because he cheated on Olivia by having a one-night stand with Bree. A homeless Bilal seeks refuge on the Liberame, but when the boat later goes up in flames as a result of a misguided attempt at revenge by Ismail, Bilal decides to take the blame. Damien learns that Olivia was pregnant as the time of their break-up.
4	"Episode 4"	Glendyn Ivin	Belinda Chayko	28 March 2018	N/A
Having overheard her father's confession of involuntary manslaughter, Maddie decides to take off, with a little help from Asad. Graham informs Helen that as a result of proceedings, he will be withdrawing his recommendation for the magistrate's role. A confused Ismail tries to get Maddie to open up about what really happened.
