= Nicole Chamoun =

Australian actress

- Chamoun in 2024
- Born: 1 January 1984 (age 42); Australia
- Occupation: Actor
- Years active: 2007–present

Nicole Chamoun (born 1 January 1984) is an Australian actress. She is known for her role as Zahra in the 2018 SBS miniseries Safe Harbour, and for playing a lead role as Amanda Pharrell in the 2022 ABC crime drama series Troppo.

== Early life and education ==
Nicole Chamoun was born in Australia, after her parents had fled civil war in Lebanon in the late 1970s.

She studied acting and drama at Deakin University and Victoria University in Melbourne.

== Career ==
Chamoun's first screen role was in the 2007 SBS drama series Kick, as the feisty Layla, but was unable to find roles for many years afterwards, so she did a variety of jobs unrelated to acting. She worked as part-time artistic director at Rowville Secondary College in Melbourne for two and a half years.

She studied at the Melbourne Actors Lab under Peter Kalos. Soon after her agent of 10 years severed the relationship, Chamoun was given roles in episodes of The Doctor Blake Mysteries and then Ronny Chieng: International Student.

Chamoun played a young Muslim law student, Laila, in the Stan Original series Romper Stomper, and in the same year played the role of Zahra Al-Biyati in the 2018 SBS miniseries Safe Harbour. For this performance, she was nominated for the 2018 Logie Award for Most Outstanding Supporting Actress and the 2018 AACTA Award for Best Guest or Supporting Actress in a Television Drama.

In On the Ropes she played Amirah Al-Amir and was nominated for the 2019 Logie Award for Most Outstanding Actress.

Chamoun played a lead role as the troubled private investigator Amanda Pharrell in the 2022 ABC crime drama series Troppo. A second season aired in 2024.

== Filmography ==
=== TV ===
- Kick (2007) TV series - Layla Salim (13 episodes)
- City Homicide (2007) TV series - Selma Al Basri (1 episode)
- Jack and Franki: Act 1 (2015) TV movie - Hairdresser
- Ronny Chieng: International Student (2017) TV series - Pharmacist (1 episode)
- The Doctor Blake Mysteries (2017) TV series - Afina Draghici (1 episode)
- On the Ropes (2018) TV mini series - Amirah Al-Amir (4 episode)
- Safe Harbour (2018) TV mini series - Zahra Al-Bayati (4 episodes)
- Romper Stomper (2018) TV series - Laila (6 episodes)
- Troppo (2022) TV series - Amanda Pharrell (Main cast)

=== Film ===
- Last Dance (2012) - Travel Agent
- 10 Terrorists (2012) - Show's Sound Recordist
- Miss Fisher and the Crypt of Tears (2020) - Shirin's Mother
