= Wonderland (Australian TV series) =

- Wonderland promotional logo
- Genre: Comedy; Drama
- Created by: Jo Porter; Sarah Walker
- Starring: Brooke Satchwell; Michael Dorman; Jessica Tovey; Emma Lung; Ben Mingay; Tim Ross; Anna Bamford; Glenn McMillan; Tracy Mann; Michael Booth
- Opening theme: "(Come On) Come Inside"
- Country of origin: Australia
- Original language: English
- No. of seasons: 3
- No. of episodes: 44 (list of episodes)

Production
- Producers: Jo Porter; Andy Walker
- Production location: Sydney
- Running time: 60 minutes
- Production company: FremantleMedia Australia

Original release
- Network: Network Ten
- Release: 21 August 2013 – 20 May 2015

Wonderland is an Australian television romantic comedy drama series. It was first broadcast on Network Ten on 21 August 2013. The series was co-created by Jo Porter and Sarah Walker. The series is set in an apartment building and focuses on four couples as they navigate love, life and friendships. Wonderland features an ensemble cast and is filmed on location in Sydney. Three seasons of Wonderland were broadcast, before it was announced on 26 October 2015 that the show had been cancelled. The series has also aired in Europe and the United States.

== Premise ==
Wonderland focuses on the lives and loves of four couples, who live in an apartment block in Sydney, Australia. Womaniser Tom Wilcox (Michael Dorman) places a bet that he will not have sex with a female flatmate for 12 months – otherwise he will lose his beloved car. However, his ideal woman, Miranda Beaumont (Anna Bamford) soon moves in with him. The other couples are the recently married Steve Beaumont (Tim Ross) and Dani Varvaris (Jessica Tovey), teacher Colette Riger (Emma Lung) and husband Rob Duffy (Ben Mingay), and lawyer Grace Barnes (Brooke Satchwell) and her new lover Carlos Dos Santos (Glenn McMillan).

== Production ==
=== Conception ===
On 23 October 2012, Network Ten announced its slate of new programming, with Wonderland being one of five new dramas commissioned for the channel. Michael Idato from The Age reported that Ten hopes the series will "tap into" Offspring's established audience. Wonderland is billed as "a contemporary romantic comedy" and was co-created by Jo Porter and Sarah Walker. The drama has drawn comparisons to The Secret Life of Us. The 22-part project is being produced by FremantleMedia Australia. Of the series, Ten's executive producer of drama, Rick Maier, said "Wonderland is an escapist treat with a great production team and with a perfectly-balanced ensemble cast. As the song says: the world really is wonderful and we can't wait to showcase this new series on Ten." The first series of Wonderland began airing from 21 August 2013.

After 13 episodes, the finale aired in November 2013, with the remaining nine episodes scheduled to air as season two from 13 August 2014. Wonderland was commissioned for another 22 episodes, taking the episode count to 44. Of the second series, cast member Ben Mingay said "Season two steps it up a level and dives into really cool storylines and there is more comedy and drama than the first season, it's a whole other beast. Wonderland fans of the first season are going to love season two." The second season concluded after 15 episodes, airing on 19 November 2014.

On 26 October 2015, it was announced that Wonderland had been cancelled after it "failed to find a sufficient audience". Most of the third-season episodes fell below the 500,000 audience mark.

=== Casting ===
Casting for the series was announced on 28 April 2013. Brooke Satchwell was cast as lawyer Grace Barnes. Describing her character, Satchwell stated "Grace is a very linear, bottled up defamation lawyer, and as you can imagine, she is going to come slightly undone." Michael Dorman plays bachelor Tom Wilcox, while Jessica Tovey was cast as Dani Varvaris. Tovey said her character is very different from herself. She works in PR and is "quite loud, speaks her mind, is quite confident and is very Gen Y girl." Emma Lung plays Colette Riger and Ben Mingay plays Rob Duffy. Tim Ross appears as Steve Beaumont, Glenn McMillan plays Carlos Dos Santos, while newcomer Anna Bamford plays Miranda Beaumont. Ewen Leslie was cast as Nick, a love interest for Grace (Satchwell).

All the main cast members returned for the second series. Les Hill joined the cast as "the brooding but charming" Max Saliba. While Martin Sacks was cast as Steve and Miranda's father Cal Beaumont. Simone Kessell was cast as Sasha Clarke, a woman from Tom's past. Kessell described her character as being like a drug to Tom and added "my character has come on board to really, really shake things up." Elise Jansen and model Megan Gale also appear in the second season.

=== Filming ===
Network Ten announced on 29 April that Wonderland, which is set in a beach-side apartment building, had begun production. The following month, a reporter for The Daily Telegraph revealed that the cast had begun filming on location in Sydney. Filming took place in the Sydney suburb of Coogee. Filming for the second season began during late March 2014. Cast members Tovey and Ross spent two days filming in Singapore. Tovey commented "We did it guerilla style, with not much crew at all."

=== Theme music ===
The Sydney sound house Smith and Western released the show's theme song "(Come On) Come Inside" shortly before the first episode aired. The song was written and recorded by Ant Smith, Nick West, Dan Higson and Amanda Brown. It features singer and songwriter Mike Paxton on vocals. The video for "(Come On) Come Inside" premiered on The Loop on 10 August 2013. Of the song, West commented "It was a really fun process to write with so many great people and we're really stoked at how the song came about through such a collaborative and creative process. '(Come On) Come Inside' is about capturing the inviting sound of life in coastal Sydney." The track was released to radio, while fans could download it for free from the Wonderland Facebook page. Smith and Western have also composed the musical underscore featured throughout the series. Australian band Purple Cream have recorded a theme song for the show called Crazy OL World.

== Cast ==
=== Main ===
- Brooke Satchwell as Grace Barnes
- Michael Dorman as Tom Wilcox
- Jessica Tovey as Dani Varvaris
- Emma Lung as Colette Riger
- Ben Mingay as Rob Duffy
- Tim Ross as Steve Beaumont
- Anna Bamford as Miranda Beaumont
- Glenn McMillan as Carlos Dos Santos
- Tracy Mann as Maggie Wilcox
- Les Hill as Max Saliba (season 2–3)

=== Supporting ===
- Michael Booth as Harry Hewitt
- Peter Phelps as Warwick Wilcox
- James Pratt as Gary
- Maggie Dence as Ruth MacPherson
- Mia Pistorius as Jade Montgomery
- Roy Billing as Peter Varvaris
- Denise Roberts as Sandra Duffy
- Ewen Leslie as Nick Deakin
- Lydia Sarks as Leigh Burrows
- Peter Phelps as Warwick Wilcox
- Martin Sacks as Cal Beaumont (season 2–3)
- Simone Kessell as Sasha Clarke (season 2–3)
- Elise Jansen as Ava McGuire (season 2–3)

=== Guests ===
- Beau Brady as Charlie (1 episode)
- Brittany Byrnes as Pip Sallinger (1 episode)
- Catherine Mack-Hancock as Kelly (2 episodes)
- Charlotte Gregg as Nadine (1 episode)
- Darren Gilshenan as Lyle Newell (2 episodes)
- Denise Roberts (1 episode)
- Diana McLean as Celebrant (1 episode)
- Guy Edmonds as Jason (1 episode)
- Helen Thomson as Jackie Page (1 episode)
- Kate Raison as Katherine Barnes (3 episodes)
- Lisa Hensley as Vanessa (1 episode)
- Roxane Wilson as Kate (1 episode)

== Episodes ==
| Series | Episodes | Originally released | |
| Series | Episodes | First released | Last released |
|---|---|---|---|
| 1 | 13 | 21 August 2013 | 13 November 2013 |
| 2 | 15 | 13 August 2014 | 19 November 2014 |
| 3 | 16 | 4 February 2015 | 20 May 2015 |

== Reception ==
Wonderland opened with an audience of 948,000, which was one of Network Ten's best performances of the year. The show was also considered a hit in its target advertising demographic, as it was the most watched show among 25- to 54-year-olds and fifth among all people. However, by the third episode ratings had fallen to 688,000, making it the 15th most watched show among all people. The sixth episode, which went up against the series finale of Winners & Losers, saw ratings fall to their lowest with only 420,000 viewers tuning in.

Erin Miller from TV Week praised the series, saying "Wonderland is a lot of fun. It's sexy, relatable and features a group of friends you'll wish were your mates. Sure it echoes The Secret Life of Us, but this is a whole new bunch of twentysomethings whose relationship and work issues will draw you in." Miller added that she was looking forward to catching up with the gang every week. David Knox from TV Tonight gave the series a mixed review and pointed out that it "feels too white-bread to reasonably reflect suburban Australia". He also observed that the characters are all heterosexual and only one cast member is over 40. Knox commented "Wonderland boasts TV's sexiest cast, which compensates for material that is sometimes pedestrian and antics used in place of character-based humour." He added that the series begins "from a pleasant launch pad, but has big shoes to fill in the Offspring slot. With a bit more grunt it may just get there."

Tony Squires, writing for The Age, said "Wonderland doesn't try to be Offspring, even if it has a similar desire to leaven its drama with comic moments. Set in a Sydney beachside apartment block of the same name, it has a sunny vibe to it." Squires went on to praise Dorman's performance and the rest of the cast, adding that the show had "plenty of promise." The Guardian's Vicky Frost thought elements of the opening episode were not surprising and some relationships were "too neatly laid out." She quipped "Wonderland ticks all the usual boxes and adds a bit of ocean glamour; Coogee has never looked so beautiful. But it's not yet clear what lies beneath the gloss. Is there any substance?"

Bamford was nominated for Most Outstanding Newcomer at the 2014 Logie Awards.

=== Ratings ===
| Season | # of Episodes | Season Premiere | Season Final | Peak Audience | Average Audience |
|---|---|---|---|---|---|
| One | 13 | 21 August 2013 | 13 November 2013 | 948,000 | 602,000 |
| Two | 15 | 13 August 2014 | 19 November 2014 | 532,000 | 470,000 |
| Three | 16 | 4 February 2015 | 20 May 2015 | 635,000 | 430,000 |

== Home media ==
Part 1 of the first season of Wonderland was released on DVD on 27 November 2013 in Australia.
