= Jessica Tovey =

Australian actress (born 1987)

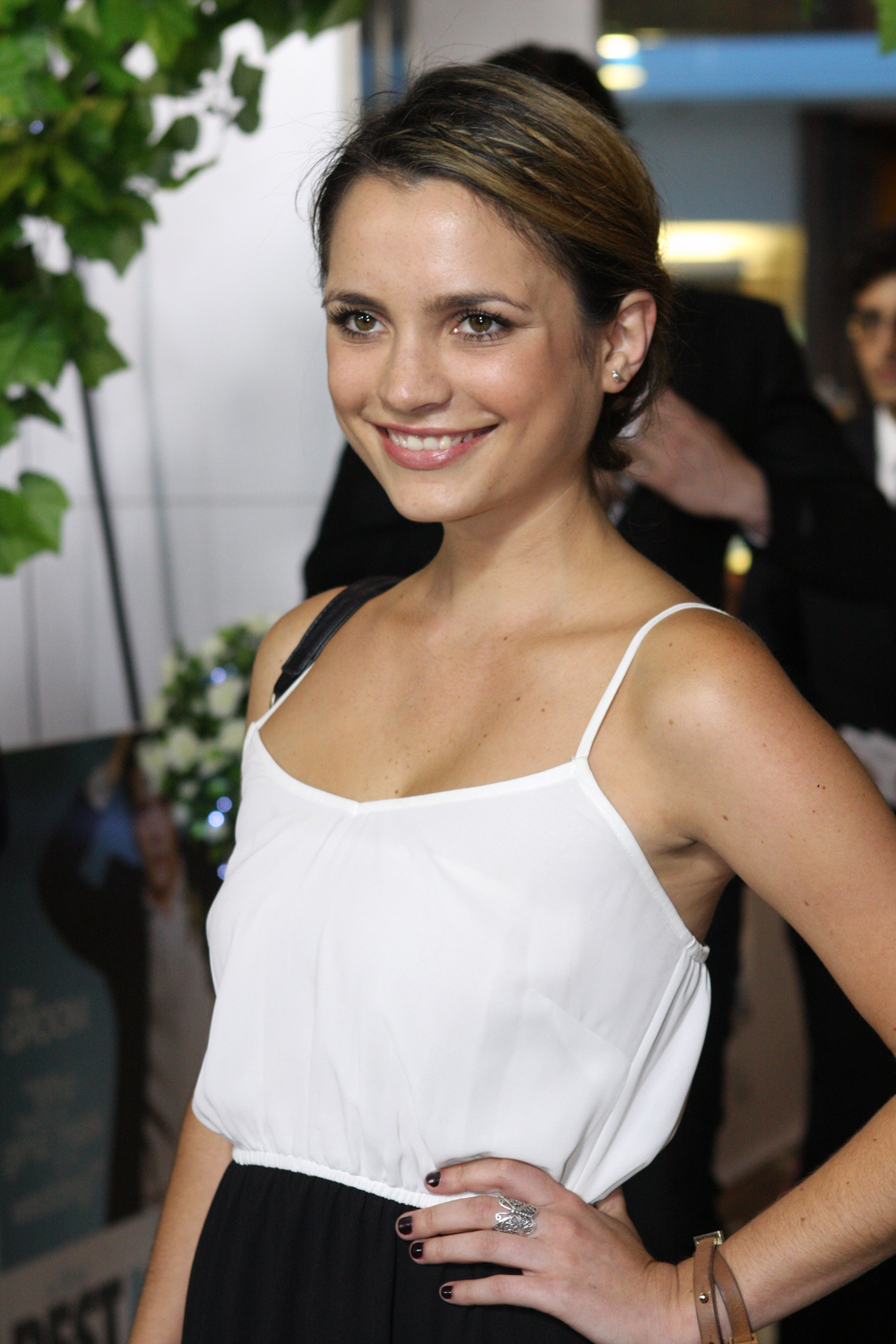
- Born: 10 November 1987 (age 39); Sydney, New South Wales, Australia
- Occupation: Actress
- Years active: 2004–present
- Children: 1
- Parent(s): Libby Gleeson; Euan Tovey

Jessica Tovey (born 10 November 1987) is an Australian actress. Tovey graduated from the Newtown High School of the Performing Arts and has made appearances for various drama companies. She is best known for her role of Belle Taylor on the long-running Australian soap opera Home and Away. Tovey joined the show in 2006 and was nominated for two Logie Awards during her time there. In 2009, she announced she had quit Home and Away and her character was killed off. Tovey became the face of American shoe company, Skechers. She appeared in Underbelly: The Golden Mile in 2010 and Paper Giants: The Birth of Cleo in 2011. Tovey had a recurring role in the Wolf Creek TV Series in 2016, followed by a lead role in the 2019 miniseries Bad Mothers.

== Early life ==
Tovey was born in Sydney on 10 November 1987. Her mother is author Libby Gleeson and her father is Euan Tovey, a New Zealand research scientist. She has two older sisters, Amelia and Josephine. Her sister Josephine is a journalist for The Sydney Morning Herald. Tovey began acting when she was around six years old, appearing in various plays. She graduated from Newtown High School of the Performing Arts, where she appeared in a number of stage productions.

== Career ==
Tovey has played leading roles at Australian Theatre for Young People, drama festivals and in The Global Shakespeare Festival, where she won acclaim for her performance in Macbeth. In 2005, she joined the cast of children's program Wicked Science as Nadine.

In 2006, just as she was beginning her HSC, Tovey joined the main cast of Home and Away as Belle Taylor. For her portrayal of the character, Tovey was nominated for Most Popular New Female Talent and Most Popular Actress at the 2007 and 2010 Logie Awards respectively. In April 2009, Tovey announced that she had quit Home and Away and her character was killed off.

In 2008, American shoe company, Skechers announced that Tovey would be their new celebrity face. Tovey became the first non-American to feature in the brand's ad campaigns. Tovey joined the cast of Underbelly: The Golden Mile in April 2010, appearing as Constable Wendy Jones. In August, she joined the cast of Panic at Rock Island, a Nine Network telemovie drama. Tovey also made a guest appearance on police drama Cops L.A.C.. She appeared in the 2011 ABC television miniseries Paper Giants: The Birth of Cleo as Leslie Carpenter. Tovey was cast as Dani Varvaris in the romantic-comedy drama Wonderland.

On stage, Tovey appeared in the world premiere of Lachlan Philpott's play Truck Stop for Sydney's Q Theatre Company in 2012. Further stage credits include Lola in a stage adaptation by Tom Holloway of Double Indemnity for the Melbourne Theatre Company in 2016, a touring production of Constellations by Nick Payne for the Queensland Theatre Company in 2017, and Portia in Bell Shakespeare's touring production of The Merchant of Venice the same year.

From 2016, Tovey appeared in the Stan series Wolf Creek She starred in the Nine Network miniseries Bad Mothers in 2019, alongside Jessica Marais, Mandy McElhinney, and Shalom Brune-Franklin. In 2024, Tovey appeared in the Jennifer Van Gessel's horror film Water Horse.

== Personal life ==
Tovey has been in a relationship with actor Damien Strouthos since 2017. She gave birth to their first child, a daughter, in September 2021.

== Filmography ==
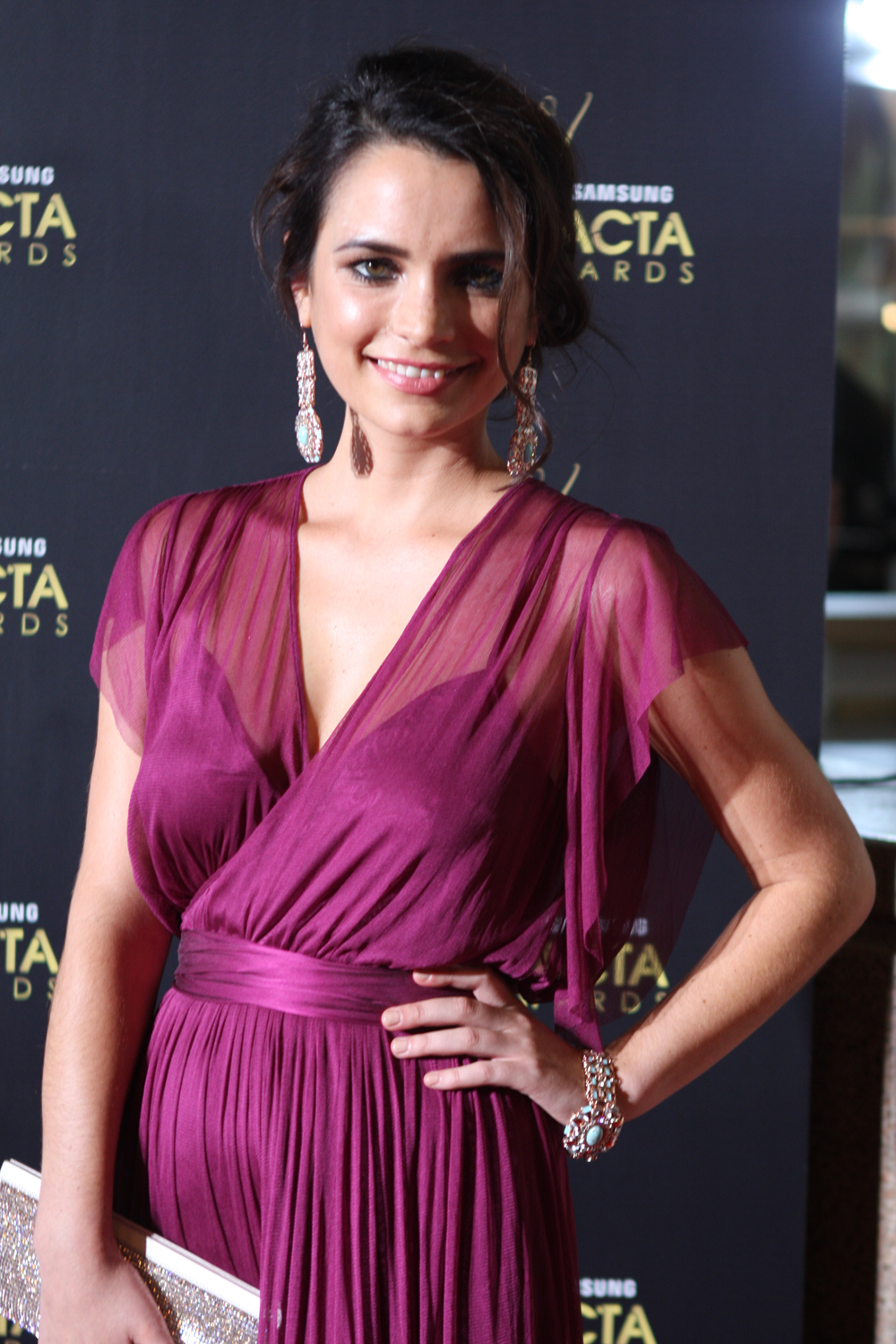
Tovey in 2012

=== Film ===
Year	Title	Role	Type
2007	Smile for Me	Simone	Short film
2010	Wanderlust	Eva	Short film
2010	Professor Kellog and the Colombian Bookshop Crack Adventure	Katy	Short film
2011	Reception	Evelyn	Short film
2012	Census	Milly	Short film
2013	Adoration	Mary	
2013	Tracks	Jenny	
2014	Lemon Tree Passage	Maya	
2019	Beast No More	Mary Jane	
2024	Water Horse	Detective Suzanne Lee	

=== Television ===
Year	Title	Role	Type
2005	Wicked Science	Nadine Sterling	Episodes: "Ghost Girl", "Ring of Confidence"
2006–2009	Home and Away	Belle Taylor	Series regular
2009	Rescue: Special Ops	Caitlin Kelly	Episode: "Eco-warriors"
2010	Wicked Love: The Maria Korp Story	Laura Korp	TV movie
2010	Underbelly: The Golden Mile	Wendy Jones	Recurring
2010	Cops L.A.C.	Tash	Episode: "Blood Types"
2011	Panic at Rock Island	Nina Quinn	TV movie
2011	Paper Giants: The Birth of Cleo	Leslie Carpenter	Episodes: "Part One", "Part Two"
2012	Dance Academy	Jess	Recurring
2013	Mr & Mrs Murder	Claire Rickard-Smith	Episode: "A Flare for Murder"
2013–2015	Wonderland	Dani Varvaris	Main cast
2014–2015	Movie Juice	Presenter	
2016	Wolf Creek	Kirsty Hill	Recurring
2018	True Story with Hamish and Andy	Lisa	Episode: "Lisa"
2019	Bad Mothers	Danielle	Miniseries
