= Glenn McMillan =

Australian actor (born 1984)

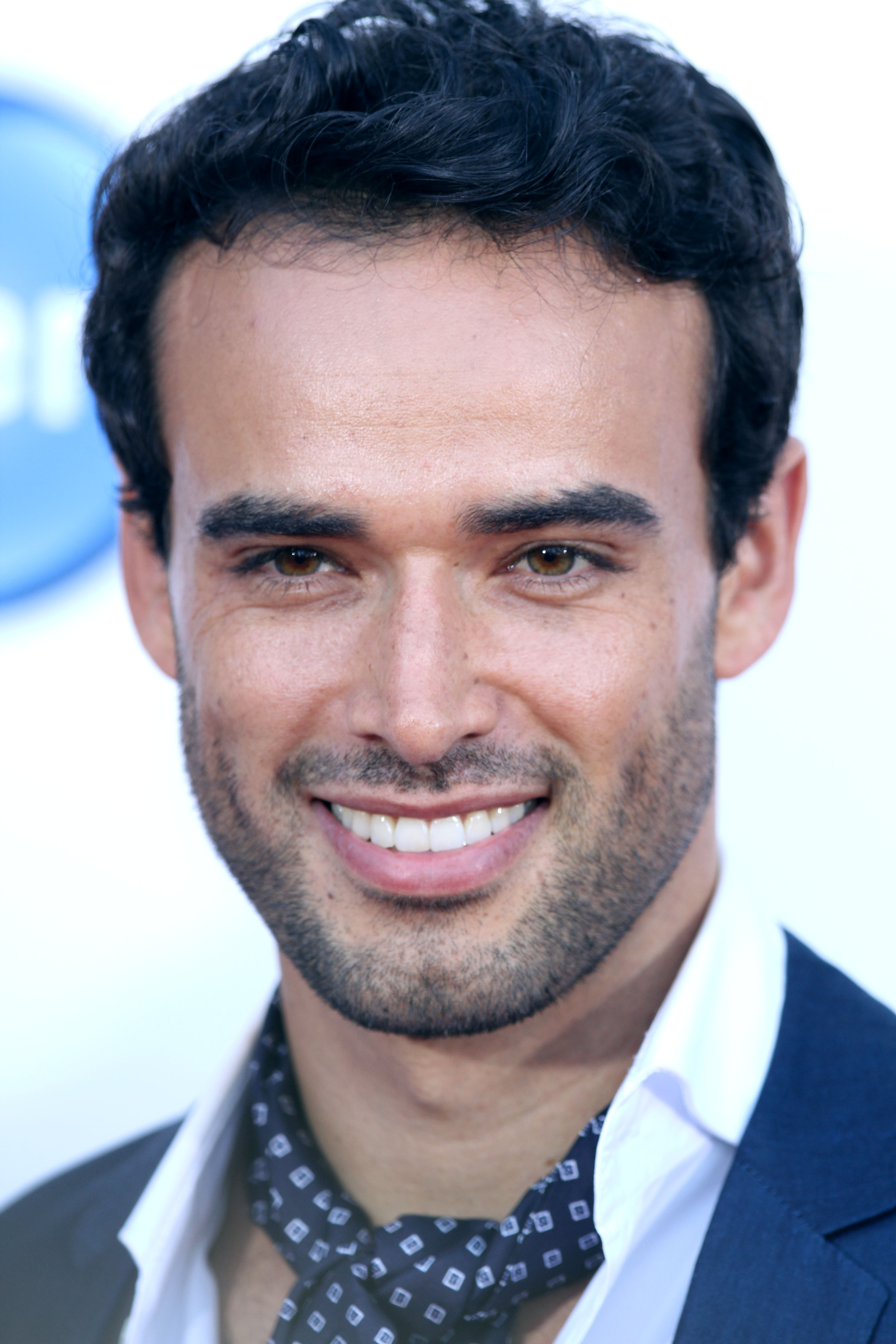
- McMillan at the 2014 Aria Music Awards
- Born: 5 October 1984 (age 41); São João da Boa Vista, São Paulo, Brazil
- Citizenship: Brazil; Australia
- Occupations: Actor, lawyer
- Years active: 1999-present
- Notable work: Power Rangers Ninja Storm
- Spouse: Julia Alonso (m. 2016)
- Children: 1

Glenn Aguiar McMillan (born 5 October 1984) is a Brazilian and Australian actor and lawyer best known internationally for his role as Waldo “Dustin” Brooks, the Yellow Wind Ranger on Power Rangers Ninja Storm.

== Early life ==
Glenn Aguiar McMillan was born in São João da Boa Vista, Brazil to a Brazilian mother and an Australian father of Irish descent, and was raised in Adelaide, South Australia, Australia from the age of three.

== Career ==
=== Acting career ===
McMillan's first professional acting role was at age 11 in a State Theatre Company of South Australia production of Six Characters in Search of an Author, by Luigi Pirandello, playing the role of the "Young Boy". In 1998, he played "Ben Handleman" in his first feature film, Sally Marshall Is Not an Alien, followed by the role of "Tiny Maloney" in the television series 'Chuck Finn' for Seven Network in 1999. He has performed in numerous theatre productions, including the role of "Jack" in Into the Woods by James Lapine and Stephen Sondheim, and "Vyasa" in the Mahabharata. From 2002 to 2003, McMillan played the role of "Dustin Brooks" in Power Rangers Ninja Storm, filmed in New Zealand, then "Bronley Hale" in Zenon: Z3 for Disney Channel, shot on location in South Africa, and Power Rangers Dino Thunder. In 2012, McMillan appeared in the feature film Swerve, followed by the role of "Adauto Agallo" in the award-winning miniseries Mrs Biggs. From 2013 to 2015 he filmed the Australian television drama Wonderland for Network Ten, in which he played "Carlos dos Santos".

== Personal life ==
McMillan holds dual Australian and Brazilian nationalities. He remains close to his Brazilian heritage, speaks fluent Portuguese, and revisits his place of birth often.

McMillan trains in Brazilian jiu-jitsu at Alliance Australia. He earned his blue belt from Roger Gracie, and currently holds a purple belt awarded to him by Fabio Gurgel.

In 2016, McMillan married Julia Alonso, a Brazilian doctor. During the start of the COVID-19 pandemic, his wife gave birth to a child.

McMillan holds a Bachelor of Laws with Honours from the University of Adelaide Law School, one semester of which he took on exchange at Pace University School of Law, New York. He also holds a Graduate Diploma of Legal Practice and a Master of Laws Majoring in Commercial Litigation from the College of Law, Sydney. He is admitted as a lawyer in Australia, England and Wales.

Outside of acting and law practice, McMillan is a property sales consultant with TOOP+TOOP Real Estate in Hyde Park, Adelaide.

== Filmography ==
Year	Title	Role	Notes
1999	Sally Marshall Is Not an Alien	Ben Handleman	Main Role
1999	Chuck Finn	Theodore "Tiny" Maloney	26 episodes
2003	Power Rangers Ninja Storm	Dustin Brooks / Yellow Wind Ranger	Main Role
2004	Zenon: Z3	Bronley Hale	made for television (Disney Channel)
2004	Strange Days at Blake Holsey High	Guy in the Cinema	1 episode
2004	Power Rangers Dino Thunder	Dustin Brooks / Yellow Wind Ranger	"Thunder Storm" Pt. 1 and 2 (PRDT/PRNS crossover)
2011	Swerve	Saxophone Player	Uncredited
2012	Mrs Biggs	Adauto Agallo	
2013–15	Wonderland	Carlos dos Santos	
