= Brooke Satchwell =

Australian actress

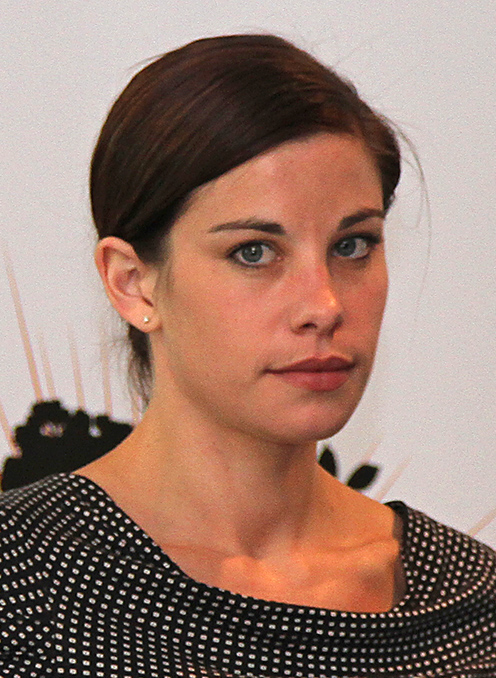
- Satchwell in 2010
- Born: Brooke Kerith Satchwell; 1980 (age 45–46); Melbourne, Victoria, Australia
- Occupation: Actress
- Years active: 1994–present
- Television: Anne Wilkinson in Neighbours; Donna McCarthy in Dangerous; Show Me the Movie!; The Twelve

Brooke Kerith Satchwell (born 1980) is an Australian actress and former model. She is known for playing Anne Wilkinson in the soap opera Neighbours from 1995 until 2000. She won the Logie Award for Most Popular New Talent in 1998. Since leaving Neighbours, Satchwell has starred in Water Rats, White Collar Blue, Tripping Over, Dangerous, Packed to the Rafters, Wonderland, and Mr Inbetween. She has also been a panellist on The Panel, Dirty Laundry Live, and Show Me the Movie!

== Early life and education ==
Brooke Kerith Satchwell was born in 1980. She lived in Teesdale, Victoria, for most of her early life and has one sibling. She attended Toorak College.

== Career ==
Satchwell started acting in 1994, when a casting agent suggested she model in a few television advertisements. She also appeared in the ABC Television musical Harriet. After she had completed work on an advertisement for Just Jeans, a make-up artist advised Satchwell to get an agent. A year later she successfully auditioned for the role of Anne Wilkinson in the daily television soap opera Neighbours. Satchwell decided to leave Neighbours after three years, as she wanted a change. She filmed her final scenes in December 1999, and they aired in April 2000. After Neighbours, Satchwell filmed a small role in the independent film Radio Samurai. She also relocated to Sydney to appear in a production of The Caribbean Tempest at the Royal Botanic Garden alongside Alex Dimitriades and Bill Hunter. Television roles in Water Rats and Tripping Over followed. In 2002, she joined the main cast of White Collar Blue as Sofia Marinkovitch.

After an appearance on The Panel, Satchwell was later invited back as a panellist. She modelled for Pantene and was signed to act as their brand ambassador in 2004. Since 2006, Satchwell has presented a number of episodes of the children's television show Play School. She received her first lead role in a film in Subdivision, which was released in cinemas on 20 August 2009. In 2012, Satchwell joined the cast of the drama series Packed to the Rafters as Frankie, an electrician and employee of Dave Rafter. In 2013, she became a regular panellist on the celebrity gossip/comedy show Dirty Laundry Live. That same year, Satchwell joined the cast of Wonderland as lawyer Grace Barnes. After three seasons, Wonderland was cancelled due to falling ratings.

In 2014, Satchwell made a guest appearance on the sketch comedy series Black Comedy as Tiffany. She reprised the character in the second series in 2016. She also appeared in the Jack Irish series. 2018 saw Satchwell make guest appearances on Hughesy, We Have a Problem, and the SBS drama Dead Lucky. She also plays Ally, the girlfriend of hit-man Ray Shoesmith, in the black comedy-drama Mr Inbetween. Towards the end of the year, Satchwell replaced Jane Harber as team captain for the second season of comedy panel show Show Me the Movie!.

Satchwell plays park ranger Miranda Gibson, the estranged daughter of Laura Gibson (Sigrid Thornton), in the revival series of SeaChange. Satchwell almost missed the casting call, as she was moving house. Filming for SeaChange and the second season of Mr Inbetween took place concurrently, necessitating frequent flights between Sydney and various coastal locations.

In 2024, Satchwell appeared in the SBS series Triple Oh!. She plays the lead in the 2026 Stan drama series Dear Life, for which she won the 2026 Logie Award for Best Lead Actress in a Drama. She also appeared in the ABC comedy drama Dog Park.

== Other activities ==
Satchwell has promoted charity work as a fundraiser for the Starlight Children's Foundation Gift of a Lifetime, and in joining the fight against sand mining of Sydney's historic Kurnell sand dunes.

In 2009, Satchwell supported Power Shift, a climate-change conference for young people held in Sydney.

== Personal life ==
Satchwell's five-year relationship with actor Matthew Newton ended in 2006. Newton was charged with four offences against Satchwell: common assault, intimidation, and assault occasioning actual bodily harm. Three of the charges were withdrawn by prosecutors, with Newton pleading guilty to the remaining charge of common assault.

On 26 November 2008, Satchwell was in a building which was attacked by terrorists in the 2008 Mumbai attacks. She hid in a cupboard until gunfire ceased.

Satchwell was engaged to film editor David Gross from 2012 until 2019. In 2015, she stated that long times separated by distance made it hard for them to ever set a date for the wedding.

== Filmography ==
Satchwell signing autographs for fans in 2007

=== Television ===
Year	Title	Role	Notes
1996–2000	Neighbours	Anne Wilkinson	Logie Award for Most Popular New Talent (1998); People's Choice Award for Most Popular Teen Idol (1999)
2000–2001	Water Rats	Sophie Ferguson	Recurring
2001–2002	BeastMaster	Rhana	Episodes: "The Crystal Ark" and "Rites of Passage"
2002–2003	White Collar Blue	Sophia Marinkovitch	Series regular
2004	Small Claims: White Wedding	Imogen	Television film
2006–2010	Play School	Presenter	
2006	Tripping Over	Felicity	
2007	Dangerous	Donna McCarthy	
2008	Canal Road	Bridget Keenan	
2010	Talkin' 'Bout Your Generation	Herself	
2011	The Jesters	Herself	Episode: "Stunted"
2012–2013	Packed to the Rafters	Frankie Calasso	Series regular
2013–2016	Dirty Laundry Live	Panellist	
2013–2015	Wonderland	Grace Barnes	Series regular
2014–2016	Black Comedy	Tiffany	Guest
2016	Jack Irish	Tina Longmore	2 episodes
2018	Hughesy, We Have a Problem	Herself	Celebrity problem
2018	Dead Lucky	Claire	
2018–2021	Mr Inbetween	Ally	Series regular
2019	Show Me the Movie!	Herself	Team captain
2019	SeaChange	Miranda Gibson	
2019–2021	Love On The Spectrum	Narrator	
2020	ABC Reef Live	Herself	Co-host
2022	The Twelve	Georgina Merrick	AACTA Award for Best Guest or Supporting Actress in a Television Drama (2022)
2023	Black Snow	Chloe Walcott	Written by Lucas Taylor; released on Stan
2023	Inside Sydney Airport	Narrator	
2024	Triple Oh!	Tayls	5 episodes
2024	The Jury: Death on the Staircase	Narrator	5 episodes
2026	Dear Life	Lillian	TV series: 6 episodes
2026	Dog Park	Emma	TV series; 3 episodes

=== Film ===
Year	Title	Role	Notes
2002	Radio Samurai	Ethel	
2004	Right Here Right Now	Jenny	Not distributed
2008	Corrections	Amy Perrin	Short film
2009	Echo	Bella	Short film
2009	Subdivision	Tiffany	Feature film
2019	Ride Like a Girl	Therese Payne	Feature film
2022	Poker Face	Nicole Foley	Feature film
2025	Kangaroo	Liz	Feature film

== Theatre ==
Year	Production	Role	Director
1999	Elegies for Angels, Punks and Raging Queens	Tina	Leon Gallagher
1999	Vagina Monologues	Herself	Caroline Stacey, Adrian Bohm Productions
2000	The Caribbean Tempest	Miranda	Toby Gough, Holders Season, Barbados
2001	The Graduate	Elaine Robinson	Terry Johnson, The Really Usefull [sic] Co
2010	The Clean House	Matilde	Kate Cherry
