= Sarah Walker (author) =

Australian writer

- Born: 1965 (age 60–61); Sydney, New South Wales, Australia
- Occupations: Writer, script producer

Sarah Walker (born 1965) is an Australian author, screenwriter and script producer. She has written for several serial dramas, including Home and Away, Neighbours, and All Saints. She co-created the comedy drama Wonderland with Jo Porter in 2013. Walker has also written novels and worked as a journalist and actor, appearing in Man of Flowers (1983).

== Early and personal life ==
Walker was born and raised in Sydney. As a teenager she wrote scripts, and briefly worked as an actress. She studied creative writing while working in the magazine industry, and she has a BA Communication from the University of Technology Sydney. She was the chief subeditor of New Weekly.

Walker is openly lesbian and came out when she was 16.

== Career ==
Walker received a publishing contract for two novels, and she wrote the coming out story The Year of Freaking Out in 1997. She began her screen writing career with the serial drama Breakers. Following its cancellation, she moved onto Home and Away and All Saints. She helped create the character Charlotte Beaumont (played by Tammy MacIntosh), who was initially a lesbian; however, when Walker left the serial, Charlotte became straight. Walker has written for Neighbours, HeadLand, and A Place To Call Home. She helped develop Winners & Losers, and co-created Wonderland. She has also worked on Wentworth.

In 2016, Walker received an Australian Writers' Guild nomination for "Episode 6381" of Home and Away in the Best Script for a Television Serial category.

In 2023, she was announced as part of the writing team for the second series of The Twelve. She also wrote an episode for the SBS series Erotic Stories.

== Selected credits ==
Year	Title	Role	Notes
2025	The Old Guard 2	Writer	Movie
2025	The Last Anniversary	Writer, script producer	2 episodes
2022-present	The Twelve	Writer, executive producer	8 episodes
2023	Erotic Stories	Writer	1 episode
2023	Mother and Son	Writer	3 episodes
2020-22	The Secrets She Keeps	Writer, developer, executive producer	7 episodes
2019	Bad Mothers	Writer	1 episode
2017	The Wrong Girl	Writer	1 episode
2015	Home and Away: An Eye for an Eye	Writer	TV movie
2014-19	Neighbours	Writer	58 episodes
2013-15	Wentworth	Writer, script consultant	7 episodes
2013-15	Wonderland	Writer, script producer	44 episodes
2013	A Place to Call Home	Writer	1 episode
2011	Winners & Losers	Script producer	8 episodes
2005	HeadLand	Writer	1 episode
2001-05	All Saints	Editor, writer	24 episodes
2000-18	Home and Away	Script consultant, writer	289 episodes
1998-99	Breakers	Story editor	429 episodes

== Books ==
- Simple Things - published by Pan Macmillan, 1996
- The Year of Freaking Out - published by Pan Macmillan, 1997
- Camphor Laurel - published by Pan Macmillan, 1998 (Winner Honour Children's Book of the Year)
- Water Colours - published by Hodder, 2000
- If Only - published by Published by Hodder Headline, 2001
- The Tin Man - published by Allen & Unwin, 2000
- Lucky Three - published by Hodder, 2003
