= Doctor Doctor season 3 =

Doctor Doctor
- Season 3
- Home media release cover art
- Starring: Rodger Corser; Nicole da Silva; Ryan Johnson; Tina Bursill; Hayley McElhinney
- No. of episodes: 10

Release
- Original network: Nine Network
- Original release: 6 August – 8 October 2018

Season chronology
- ← Previous; Season 2 Next → Season 4

The third season of Doctor Doctor (known as The Heart Guy outside of Australasia), an Australian drama television series, premiered on Nine Network on 6 August 2018.

This season marks the final appearance of Steve Bisley as the character of Jim Knight is killed off in the first episode.

== Cast ==
=== Main ===
- Rodger Corser as Hugh Knight
- Nicole da Silva as Charlie Knight (née Pereira)
- Ryan Johnson as Matt Knight
- Tina Bursill as Meryl Knight
- Hayley McElhinney as Penny Cartwright
- Chloe Bayliss as Hayley Mills Knight
- Matt Castley as Ajax Cross Knight
- Belinda Bromilow as Betty Bell
- Brittany Clark as Mia Halston
- Charles Wu as Ken Liu

=== Special guest ===
- Steve Bisley as Jim Knight (episode 1)

=== Recurring and guest ===
- Annie Byron as Vivian (3 episodes)
- Lester Morris as Gordon (2 episodes)
- Uli Latukefu as Darren (3 episodes)
- Vince Colosimo as Carlito (3 episodes)
- Annabel Wolfe as Ivy Win (3 episodes)
- Genevieve Hegney as Harriet (2 episodes)
- Ellis Watts (3 episodes)
- Winta McGrath as Floyd (2 episodes)
- Miranda Tapsell as April (2 episodes)

== Episodes ==
No. overall	No. in season	Title	Directed by	Written by	Original release date	Prod. code	Aus. viewers
21	1	"Tell Her, It's Over!"	Geoff Bennett	Tony McNamara	6 August 2018	278221-21	726,000
Three months have passed; Jim has died of a heart attack and the family express a fond farewell at his wake, while Hugh, already knowing he has inherited the property, discovers that the farm is in millions of dollars of debt. Struggling with grief, Meryl puts on a brave front, but is plagued with nightmares about Jim's death and avoids sleep. Hayley is heavily pregnant, Matt and Ajax are at war over how the farm should be run, and Hugh and Penny give into temptation and sleep together, but it is only short-lived as Hugh's probation expires and his license to practice is reinstated and he is offered his old job in Sydney; however, with his current family crisis, he decides to temporarily stay on in Whyhope.
22	2	"Isn't She Lovely"	Geoff Bennett	Tony McNamara	13 August 2018	278221-22	671,000
Having decided to stay in Whyhope for the time being, Hugh is forced to take on responsibilities at the farm. Following a drunken night at the glamping site, Matt lands himself in trouble when he is informed by Darren that his liquor license doesn't extend beyond the bar, therefore the alcohol had been sold illegally; however, Matt and Charlie discover that Darren is corrupt when he takes a bribe instead of reporting the incident. Penny is trying to cope with the fact that she and Hugh slept together and now he is gone, but things become awkward when she realises that Hugh never actually left. Meryl is still avoiding sleep, so Hugh finally steps in and offers help. Hayley's life is in danger as she is diagnosed with pre-eclampsia forcing Hugh to perform an emergency C-section which leads to Hayley giving birth of a premature baby boy.
23	3	"Shock Rock"	Lucy Gaffy	Liz Doran	20 August 2018	278221-23	684,000
It is the opening day of Hugh and Penny's new cardiac clinic, but the day does not turn out as planned as Hugh's ex-wife, Harriet, turns up and announces that she is pregnant and that he has two options − either she stays in Sydney and they raise the baby together, or they cut contact and she returns to the U.S. When he comes clean to Penny, this puts an end to their relationship. Charlie's father, Carlito, arrives with a 15-year-old girl named Ivy who is the daughter of his current girlfriend. Hayley is still disturbed over the pre-eclampsia incident and believes that she is being punished by God for giving birth to a child out of wedlock; however, she soon snaps out of it and announces she and Ajax have decided to call the baby Jim. Meryl decides to give Jim's clothes to a charity shop, a decision she later regrets; but after buying them all back, she and her three sons hold a ceremony by burning his clothes as a way of saying goodbye.
24	4	"Runaway Baby"	Lucy Gaffy	Tamara Asmar	27 August 2018	278221-24	639,000
25	5	"When We Collide"	Ian Watson	Gretel Vella	3 September 2018	278221-25	647,000
26	6	"Call Me Irresponsible"	Ian Watson	Timothy Lee	10 September 2018	278221-26	631,000
27	7	"Don't Wanna Let You Go"	Jennifer Leacey	Angela McDonald	17 September 2018	278221-27	667,000
28	8	"Wet Weekends"	Lisa Matthews	Liz Doran	24 September 2018	278221-28	315,000
29	9	"Suspicious Minds"	Ben Chessell & Lucy Gaffy	Angela McDonald & Gretel Vella	1 October 2018	278221-29	565,000
30	10	"No Laughing Matter"	Ben Chessell & Lucy Gaffy	Tony McNamara	8 October 2018	278221-30	642,000
Matt realises how much he misses Charlie, but is torn between his love for her and his growing love for April; Charlie becomes aware that something is wrong and decided to come home. Hugh is determined to move to Sydney, while Harriet is intent on inducing labour. Hugh and Penny are called to the scene of an accident involving a cattle truck which has tipped over. While there, Penny issues him with an ultimatum − if he remains in Whyhope, they can be together, but he chooses his life in Sydney. Hugh returns to the hospital to meet his baby daughter; everyone grows concerned when Harriet flees the hospital, leaving her baby behind. Meryl continues to sabotage Ajax's plans to start up his cemetery business on the farm, for which she is fighting a losing battle. Hugh has no other option but to remain in Whyhope; Harriet is gone and he is left with his daughter.

== Reception ==
=== Ratings ===
No.	Title	Air date	Overnight ratings		Consolidated ratings		Total viewers	Ref(s)
No.	Title	Air date	Viewers	Rank	Viewers	Rank	Total viewers	Ref(s)
1	"Tell Her, It's Over!"	6 August 2018	726,000	8	108,000	7	828,000	
2	"Isn't She Lovely"	13 August 2018	671,000	11	122,000	8	793,000	
3	"Shock Rock"	20 August 2018	684,000	10	137,000	8	821,000	
4	"Runaway Baby"	27 August 2018	639,000	13	141,000	10	790,000	
5	"When We Collide"	3 September 2018	647,000	12	137,000	9	784,000	
6	"Call Me Irresponsible"	10 September 2018	631,000	12	132,000	9	763,000	
7	"Don't Wanna Let You Go"	17 September 2018	667,000	13	130,000	8	797,000	
8	"Wet Weekends"	24 September 2018	315,000	—N/a	—N/a	—N/a	315,000	
9	"Suspicious Minds"	1 October 2018	565,000	14	145,000	9	700,000	
10	"No Laughing Matter"	8 October 2018	642,000	12	110,000	11	752,000	

=== Award nominations ===
Logie Awards (2019)

- Nominated: Gold Logie Award for Most Popular Personality on Australian Television – Rodger Corser
- Nominated: Logie Award for Most Popular Actor – Rodger Corser
- Nominated: Logie Award for Most Popular Drama Program – Doctor Doctor
- Nominated: Logie Award for Most Outstanding Drama Series – Doctor Doctor

Screen Producers Australia (2019)

- Nominated: SPA Award for Drama Series Production of the Year – Doctor Doctor

TV Tonight Awards (2019)

- Nominated: TV Tonight Award for Best Australian Drama – Doctor Doctor

== Home media ==
Title	Country	Availability		Release		Ref(s)
Title	Country	DVD	Blu-ray	Release		Ref(s)
Doctor Doctor: Series 3	Australia	Yes	No	21 November 2018		
The Heart Guy: Series 3	United States	Yes	Yes	2 April 2019 (D)	23 April 2019 (B)	
Additional
General information: 10 episodes; 1.78:1 aspect ratio; Distributor: Roadshow Entertainment (Australia); Acorn Media (United States); Discs: 3-DVD set (Australia); 3-DVD set (United States); 2-Blu-ray set (United States); Rating: ACB: M; Not Rated in United States; Note: The Blu-ray release in the United States (Region A) is a manufacture on demand (MOD) release

== International release ==
Episode	United States (Acorn TV)	United Kingdom (Drama)	Sweden (STV)
3-01	12 November 2018	10 March 2019	4 November 2019
3-02	12 November 2018	17 March 2019	5 November 2019
3-03	12 November 2018	24 March 2019	6 November 2019
3-04	12 November 2018	31 March 2019	11 November 2019
3-05	12 November 2018	7 April 2019	12 November 2019
3-06	12 November 2018	14 April 2019	13 November 2019
3-07	12 November 2018	21 April 2019	18 November 2019
3-08	12 November 2018	28 April 2019	20 November 2019
3-09	12 November 2018	5 May 2019	25 November 2019
3-10	12 November 2018	12 May 2019	26 November 2019
