= Doctor Doctor season 1 =

Doctor Doctor
- Season 1
- Home media release cover art
- Starring: Rodger Corser; Nicole da Silva; Ryan Johnson; Tina Bursill; Hayley McElhinney; Steve Bisley
- No. of episodes: 10

Release
- Original network: Nine Network
- Original release: 14 September – 16 November 2016

Season chronology
- Next → Season 2

The first season of Doctor Doctor (known as The Heart Guy outside of Australasia), an Australian drama television series, premiered on Nine Network on 14 September 2016.

== Cast ==
=== Main ===
- Rodger Corser as Hugh Knight
- Nicole da Silva as Charlie Knight (née Pereira)
- Ryan Johnson as Matt Knight
- Tina Bursill as Meryl Knight
- Hayley McElhinney as Penny Cartwright
- Chloe Bayliss as Hayley Mills Knight
- Matt Castley as Ajax Cross Knight
- Belinda Bromilow as Betty Bell
- Shalom Brune-Franklin as Aoife
- Charles Wu as Ken Liu
- Steve Bisley as Jim Knight

=== Recurring and guest ===
- Zoe Carides as Jill (2 episodes)
- Michelle Lim Davidson (2 episodes)
- Wadih Dona as Dr. Ogilvy (2 episodes)
- John Batchelor as Nathan (6 episodes)
- Winta McGrath as Floyd (6 episodes)
- Dave Eastgate as Joey (7 episodes)
- Michael Kotsohilis as Fifo Jazz (2 episodes)
- Amy Kersey as Jane (2 episodes)
- Jacek Koman as Trevor (2 episodes)
- Patrick Wilson as Rod Eagle (5 episodes)
- Lucy Durack as Tugger (6 episodes)
- Patrick Diggins as Anton (2 episodes)

== Episodes ==
| No. overall | No. in season | Title | Directed by | Written by | Original release date | Prod. code | Aus. viewers |
|---|---|---|---|---|---|---|---|
| 1 | 1 | "Doctor Doctor" | Peter Salmon | Tony McNamara | 14 September 2016 | 278221-1 | 759,000 |
| 2 | 2 | "Home Sweet Home" | Peter Salmon | Tony McNamara | 21 September 2016 | 278221-2 | 821,000 |
| 3 | 3 | "San Francisco" | Jeremy Sims | Tony McNamara | 28 September 2016 | 278221-3 | 661,000 |
| 4 | 4 | "I Need Another Drink, Said Not Me Last Night!" | Jeremy Sims | Alice Bell | 5 October 2016 | 278221-4 | 763,000 |
| 5 | 5 | "We Don't Need Another Hero" | Kriv Stenders | Liz Doran | 12 October 2016 | 278221-5 | 826,000 |
| 6 | 6 | "Golden Harvest" | Kriv Stenders | Tamara Asmar | 19 October 2016 | 278221-6 | 854,000 |
| 7 | 7 | "This is Not a Love Song" | Peter Salmon | Liz Doran | 26 October 2016 | 278221-7 | 777,000 |
| 8 | 8 | "The Truth is Out There" | Peter Salmon | Tony McNamara | 2 November 2016 | 278221-8 | 819,000 |
| 9 | 9 | "Say Sayonara" | Jeremy Sims | Tamara Asmar | 9 November 2016 | 278221-9 | 707,000 |
| 10 | 10 | "Mash" | Jeremy Sims | Tony McNamara | 16 November 2016 | 278221-10 | 785,000 |

== Reception ==
=== Ratings ===
| No. | Title | Air date | Overnight ratings | | Consolidated ratings | | Total viewers | Ref(s) |
| No. | Title | Air date | Viewers | Rank | Viewers | Rank | Total viewers | Ref(s) |
|---|---|---|---|---|---|---|---|---|
| 1 | "Doctor Doctor" | 14 September 2016 | 759,000 | 11 | 168,000 | 5 | 927,000 | |
| 2 | "Home Sweet Home" | 21 September 2016 | 821,000 | 7 | 164,000 | 3 | 985,000 | |
| 3 | "San Francisco" | 28 September 2016 | 661,000 | 11 | 145,000 | 8 | 806,000 | |
| 4 | "I Need Another Drink, Said Not Me Last Night!" | 5 October 2016 | 763,000 | 10 | 199,000 | 3 | 962,000 | |
| 5 | "We Don't Need Another Hero" | 12 October 2016 | 826,000 | 7 | 204,000 | 1 | 1,030,000 | |
| 6 | "Golden Harvest" | 19 October 2016 | 854,000 | 6 | 158,000 | 3 | 1,012,000 | |
| 7 | "This is Not a Love Song" | 26 October 2016 | 777,000 | 6 | 108,000 | 6 | 885,000 | |
| 8 | "The Truth is Out There" | 2 November 2016 | 819,000 | 6 | 185,000 | 2 | 1,004,000 | |
| 9 | "Say Sayonara" | 9 November 2016 | 707,000 | 10 | 177,000 | 5 | 884,000 | |
| 10 | "Mash" | 16 November 2016 | 785,000 | 5 | 171,000 | 1 | 956,000 | |

=== Accolades ===
Casting Guild of Australia (2016)

- Nominated: CGA Award for Best Casting in a TV Drama — Kirsty McGregor

AACTA Awards (2017)

- Nominated: AACTA Award for Best Guest or Supporting Actress in a Television Drama — Tina Bursill

Logie Awards (2017)

- Nominated: Gold Logie Award for Most Popular Personality on Australian Television — Rodger Corser
- Nominated: Logie Award for Best Actor — Rodger Corser
- Nominated: Logie Award for Most Outstanding Actor — Rodger Corser
- Nominated: Logie Award for Most Outstanding Supporting Actor — Ryan Johnson
- Nominated: Logie Award for Best New Talent — Shalom Brune-Franklin
- Nominated: Logie Award for Best Drama Program — Doctor Doctor

Screen Producers Australia (2017)

- Nominated: SPA Award for Drama Series Production of the Year – Doctor Doctor

TV Tonight Awards (2017)

- Nominated: TV Tonight Award for Best New Show (Australian) – Doctor Doctor
- Nominated: TV Tonight Award for Best Australian Drama – Doctor Doctor

== Home media ==
| Title | Country | Availability | | Release | | Ref(s) |
| Title | Country | DVD | Blu-ray | Release | | Ref(s) |
|---|---|---|---|---|---|---|
| Doctor Doctor: Series 1 | Australia | Yes | No | 23 November 2016 | | |
| The Heart Guy: Staffel 1 | Germany | Yes | No | 25 August 2017 | | |
| The Heart Guy: Series 1 | United States | Yes | Yes | 19 September 2017 (D) | 16 April 2019 (B) | |
Additional
General information: 10 episodes; 1.78:1 aspect ratio; Distributor: Roadshow Entertainment (Australia); WVG Medien (Germany); Acorn Media (United States); Discs: 3-DVD set (Australia); 3-DVD set (Germany); 3-DVD set (United States); 2-Blu-ray set (United States); Audio: English: Dolby Digital 5.1 (Australia); German: Dolby Digital 2.0 (Germany); English: Dolby Digital 2.0 (Germany); Rating: ACB: MA15+; FSK: 12; Not Rated in United States; Note: The Blu-ray release in the United States (Region A) is a manufacture on demand (MOD) release

== International release ==
| Episode | New Zealand (TVNZ 1) | United States (Acorn TV) | United Kingdom (Drama) | Sweden (STV) |
|---|---|---|---|---|
| 1-01 | 3 May 2017 | 5 June 2017 | 8 April 2018 | 17 September 2019 |
| 1-02 | 10 May 2017 | 5 June 2017 | 15 April 2018 | 18 September 2019 |
| 1-03 | 17 May 2017 | 12 June 2017 | 22 May 2018 | 23 September 2019 |
| 1-04 | 24 May 2017 | 12 June 2017 | 29 April 2018 | 24 September 2019 |
| 1-05 | 31 May 2017 | 19 June 2017 | 6 May 2018 | 25 September 2019 |
| 1-06 | 7 June 2017 | 19 June 2017 | 13 May 2018 | 30 September 2019 |
| 1-07 | 14 June 2017 | 26 June 2017 | 20 May 2018 | 1 October 2019 |
| 1-08 | 21 June 2017 | 26 June 2017 | 27 May 2018 | 2 October 2019 |
| 1-09 | 28 June 2017 | 3 July 2017 | 3 June 2018 | 7 October 2019 |
| 1-10 | 5 July 2017 | 3 July 2017 | 10 June 2018 | 8 October 2019 |

=== Streaming ===
Season one is available for catch-up streaming in demand via 9Now in Australia, and internationally from Acorn TV in the United States, TVNZ OnDemand in New Zealand and in the United Kingdom it was available via UKTV Play, but has since expired.
