= Doctor Doctor season 2 =

Doctor Doctor
- Season 2
- Home media release cover art
- Starring: Rodger Corser; Nicole da Silva; Ryan Johnson; Tina Bursill; Hayley McElhinney; Steve Bisley
- No. of episodes: 10

Release
- Original network: Nine Network
- Original release: 16 August – 18 October 2017

Season chronology
- ← Previous; Season 1 Next → Season 3

The second season of Doctor Doctor (known as The Heart Guy outside of Australasia), an Australian drama television series, premiered on Nine Network on 16 August 2017.

== Cast ==
- Rodger Corser as Hugh Knight
- Nicole da Silva as Charlie Knight (née Pereira)
- Ryan Johnson as Matt Knight
- Tina Bursill as Meryl Knight
- Hayley McElhinney as Penny Cartwright
- Chloe Bayliss as Hayley Mills Knight
- Matt Castley as Ajax Cross Knight
- Belinda Bromilow as Betty Bell
- Brittany Clark as Mia Halston
- Charles Wu as Ken Liu
- Steve Bisley as Jim Knight

== Episodes ==
No. overall	No. in season	Title	Directed by	Written by	Original release date	Prod. code	Aus. viewers
11	1	"What Difference the Day Makes"	Ian Watson	Tony McNamara	16 August 2017	278221-11	758,000
12	2	"Your Game"	Ian Watson	Tony McNamara	23 August 2017	278221-12	690,000
13	3	"Talent Showdown"	Tori Garrett	Angela McDonald	30 August 2017	278221-13	632,000
14	4	"The Great Campaign"	Tori Garrett	Liz Doran	6 September 2017	278221-14	704,000
15	5	"Both Sides Now"	Kriv Stenders	Tony McNamara	13 September 2017	278221-15	761,000
16	6	"Penny for Your Thoughts"	Kriv Stenders	Tony McNamara	20 September 2017	278221-16	645,000
17	7	"Picture of Innocence"	Lucy Gaffy	Tony McNamara	27 September 2017	278221-17	749,000
18	8	"Step in Time"	Ian Watson	Tamara Asmar	4 October 2017	278221-18	790,000
19	9	"Forgive and Forget"	Ben Chessell	Tony McNamara	11 October 2017	278221-19	745,000
20	10	"A Little Piece of Heaven"	Ben Chessell	Tony McNamara	18 October 2017	278221-20	735,000

== Reception ==
=== Ratings ===
No.	Title	Air date	Overnight ratings		Consolidated ratings		Total viewers	Ref(s)
No.	Title	Air date	Viewers	Rank	Viewers	Rank	Total viewers	Ref(s)
11	"What Difference the Day Makes"	16 August 2017	758,000	7	680,000	8	826,000	
12	"Your Game"	23 August 2017	690,000	11	630,000	10	753,000	
13	"Talent Showdown"	30 August 2017	632,000	14	550,000	13	687,000	
14	"The Great Campaign"	6 September 2017	704,000	10	107,000	9	811,000	
15	"Both Sides Now"	13 September 2017	761,000	9	880,000	7	849,000	
16	"Penny for Your Thoughts"	20 September 2017	645,000	11	135,000	9	780,000	
17	"Picture of Innocence"	27 September 2017	749,000	9	140,000	8	889,000	
18	"Step in Time"	4 October 2017	790,000	9	126,000	4	916,000	
19	"Forgive and Forget"	11 October 2017	745,000	9	109,000	8	854,000	
20	"A Little Piece of Heaven"	18 October 2017	735,000	9	131,000	8	866,000	

=== Accolades ===
AACTA Awards (2017)

- Nominated: AACTA Award for Best Lead in a Television Drama — Tina Bursill

Logie Awards (2018)

- Nominated: Gold Logie Award for Most Popular Personality on Australian Television — Rodger Corser
- Nominated: Logie Award for Best Actor — Rodger Corser
- Nominated: Logie Award for Most Outstanding Actor — Rodger Corser
- Nominated: Logie Award for Most Popular Drama Program — Doctor Doctor
- Nominated: Logie Award for Best Drama Program — Doctor Doctor

TV Tonight Awards (2018)

- Nominated: TV Tonight Award for Best Australian Drama – Doctor Doctor
- Nominated: TV Tonight Award for Favourite Male – Rodger Corser

== Home media ==
Title	Country	Availability		Release		Ref(s)
Title	Country	DVD	Blu-ray	Release		Ref(s)
Doctor Doctor: Series 2	Australia	Yes	No	6 December 2017		
The Heart Guy: Staffel 2	Germany	Yes	No	23 March 2018		
The Heart Guy: Series 2	United States	Yes	Yes	26 June 2018 (D)	16 April 2019 (B)	
Additional
General information: 10 episodes; 1.78:1 aspect ratio; Distributor: Roadshow Entertainment (Australia); WVG Medien (Germany); Acorn Media (United States); Discs: 3-DVD set (Australia); 3-DVD set (Germany); 3-DVD set (United States); 2-Blu-ray set (United States); Rating: ACB: M; FSK: 12; Not Rated in United States; Note: The Blu-ray release in the United States (Region A) is a manufacture on demand (MOD) release

== International release ==
Episode	United States (Acorn TV)	United Kingdom (Drama)	Sweden (STV)
2-01	5 February 2018	17 June 2018	9 October 2019
2-02	5 February 2018	24 June 2018	14 October 2019
2-03	12 February 2018	1 July 2018	15 October 2019
2-04	12 February 2018	8 July 2018	16 October 2019
2-05	19 February 2018	15 July 2018	21 October 2019
2-06	19 February 2018	22 July 2018	22 October 2019
2-07	26 February 2018	29 July 2018	23 October 2019
2-08	26 February 2018	5 August 2018	28 October 2019
2-09	5 March 2018	12 August 2018	29 October 2019
2-10	5 March 2018	19 August 2018	30 October 2019
