= Doctor Doctor season 4 =

Australian drama television series

Doctor Doctor
- Season 4
- Home media release cover art
- Starring: Rodger Corser; Nicole da Silva; Ryan Johnson; Tina Bursill; Hayley McElhinney
- No. of episodes: 10

Release
- Original network: Nine Network
- Original release: 5 February – 13 May 2020

Season chronology
- ← Previous; Season 3 Next → Season 5

The fourth season of Doctor Doctor (known as The Heart Guy outside of Australasia), an Australian drama television series, premiered on Nine Network on 5 February 2020. The season consists of 10 episodes. In the United Kingdom, Sweden, and the United States, the show was released in November and December 2019.

This season Dustin Clare, Kate Jenkinson and Robyn Nevin joined the cast.

Season four was intended to premiere on Nine in late 2019; however, it was delayed until 5 February 2020. It received its world premiere in the United Kingdom on Drama on 16 November 2019.

== Cast ==
=== Main ===
- Rodger Corser as Hugh Knight
- Nicole da Silva as Charlie Knight (née Pereira)
- Ryan Johnson as Matt Knight
- Tina Bursill as Meryl Knight
- Hayley McElhinney as Penny Cartwright
- Chloe Bayliss as Hayley Mills Knight
- Matt Castley as Ajax Cross Knight
- Belinda Bromilow as Betty Bell
- Charles Wu as Ken Liu
- Miranda Tapsell as April
- Kate Jenkinson as Tara Khourdair
- Dustin Clare as Jarrod

=== Special guest ===
- Robyn Nevin as Dinah

=== Recurring and guest ===
- Patrick Wilson as Rod Eagle
- Zoe Carides as Nancy Miller
- Uli Latukefu as Darren
- Tim Potter as Eddie
- Alice Ansara as Green Annie
- Alan Dukes as Glen
- Jerome Velinsky as Val
- Ella Scott Lynch as Celia

== Episodes ==
No. overall	No. in season	Title	Directed by	Written by	Original Aus. air date	Prod. code	Aus. viewers
31	1	"Hugh Am I?"	Geoff Bennett	Keith Thompson	5 February 2020	278221-31	532,000
New doctor, Tara Khourdair, arrives at Whyhope on probation for her reckless ways, mirroring how Hugh first arrived; Hugh is ordered to supervise her. It's baby Eliza's first birthday, and Hugh promises to make her his main priority. Charlie, now a successful writer, returns to Whyhope, and Matt and April fear she has come back to make trouble between them. Hugh makes a careless mistake after a rough night when he jeopardizes a deal made for the cardiac unit at the hospital. Penny's new boyfriend, Jarrod, proposes; at first reluctant, she later accepts, just to spite Hugh.
32	2	"Don't Stop Me Now"	Lisa Matthews	Liz Doran	12 February 2020	278221-32	559,000
Penny fires Hugh for losing Whyhope hospital the cardiac deal, for which he returns to the city hoping to get his old job back; when all fails, Hugh gets stoned and runs amuck on the farm. Tara hides her displeasure as Penny is appointed her new supervisor. Hayley, inspired by Charlie's new book, suggests she and Ajax bring some passion into the bedroom. The growing animosity from Matt and April towards Charlie continues. Meryl discovers that Darren has not given up his corrupt behaviour, ultimately driving a wedge between Darren and Betty; a regretful Meryl offers her apologies to an angry Betty, who vows to get revenge on her. A near-fatal accident forces Penny to give Hugh his job back.
33	3	"Self-Fulfilling Prophecies"	Geoff Bennett	Timothy Lee	19 February 2020	278221-33	540,000
Hugh, struggling with single parenthood, receives a shock when Eliza's maternal grandmother, Dinah, suddenly arrives. A jealous Matt unsuccessfully attempts to suppress his love for Charlie and finds it difficult to avoid her while April is out of town. Hugh goes in search of Dinah, who has gotten lost with Eliza in the bush. En route, Hugh and Jarrod have a dispute over what is best for Penny, causing Jarrod to suffer a serious accident; this prompts Penny to bring the wedding forward. When complications arise during a labour at the hospital, it invokes a painful memory for Tara. Meryl becomes desperate when Eddie runs for by-election, and enlists the help of Ajax; Upon discovering that he is being used as a "dummy candidate", he and Betty, who is still bitter over her break-up with Darren, band together to take on Meryl.
34	4	"A House Divided"	Lisa Matthews	Angela McDonald	26 February 2020	278221-34	525,000
Meryl and Dinah clash over Dinah's overstayed welcome. As the election draws near, Meryl and Ajax both take plan of action in order to prevent one another from winning. When a patient is diagnosed with the flu, Hugh has the staff believe that it's tuberculosis and issues a quarantine at the hospital in order to sabotage Penny's impending wedding. Penny becomes aware of this and later the pair share a brief kiss, while in denial of their feelings. Matt continues to keep April in the dark about Charlie's visits to the house. When April discovers this, she orders Charlie to leave Whyhope. Ajax plans to dish the dirt on Meryl about her corruption, however, he has a change of heart and Meryl wins the election which finally prompts Betty to bury the hatchet. A last-minute decision sees Penny and Jarrod elope and marry, breaking Hugh's heart in the process.
35	5	"The Getaway"	Erin White	Josh Mapleston	4 March 2020	278221-35	474,000
Tara is temporarily placed in the position as Hugh's boss as Penny and Jarrod plan to leave for their honeymoon. Ajax and Hayley move out of the homestead. Charlie is ready to leave Whyhope, however, realizing that she has nowhere to go, Hugh offers her accommodation in an empty wing at the hospital. Meryl and Dinah begin to bond while comparing their parental failures. Penny reveals to Jarrod that she kissed Hugh, for which he forgives her and the pair eventually set off for their honeymoon, despite a series of setbacks. A reckless night out with Hugh, Charlie, Tara, and Hugh's new dealer, Robbo, puts someone's life in serious danger. Hugh becomes frantic when he discovers that Dinah has abducted Eliza, and is caught just in time while trying to board a flight to Sydney; she reveals that Harriet is in rehab there. Meryl suggests that Hugh leave the homestead for some time as he is not fit to care for Eliza.
36	6	"Oh Baby"	Erin White	Grettel Vella	11 March 2020	278221-36	516,000
April announces that she is pregnant, and an excited Matt begins to share the news against her wishes. However, the excitement is short-lived when April discovers she has suffered a miscarriage. Meryl is disappointed at Hugh's lack of communication with Eliza since moving out. Scandalous rumours regarding Charlie and Hugh's living arrangements begin to surface. A netball team has been set up to raise funds for the hospital, an event which sees tensions explode into violence. Meryl makes a desperate attempt to become mayor of Whyhope and finds any means possible to overthrow Nancy from the position. Tara puts her career in jeopardy when she becomes jealous of a patient's mother who takes a sudden interest in Hugh, ultimately putting the patient's life at risk, and causing her to self-destruct. Charlie plans to leave for good, leaving her feelings for Matt unresolved. April forces Matt to choose between her and Charlie, for which he chooses Charlie. With both women out of his life, a depressed Matt agrees to let Hugh and Eliza move in with him.
37	7	"The Sum of All Our Choices"	Geoff Bennett	Mithila Gupta	22 April 2020	278221-37	457,000
Matt catches up with Charlie before she departs Whyhope and she decides to stay and even offers to return to work at the brewery. After a slow start, they eventually begin to work on their relationship from the ground up. Hayley decides to take some control of her life and is persuaded by Ken to take up pole dancing classes. Penny questions Jarrod on his mining work and the devastating effect it could have on Whyhope. Meryl is given the cold shoulder from her family when they reluctant to appear at her dinner celebration following her re-election as mayor. Tara and Hugh are called to a life threatening situation when a pregnant farmer is wounded with a chainsaw and Tara must take a leap of faith to save the lives of both mother and child. Penny and Jarrod have an argument for which he walks out, therefore, she seeks the comfort of Hugh. Tara spirals out of control following the traumatic events of the day and her self-destruction take a dark turn. Note: This episode was scheduled to air on 18 March 2020, however was delayed to 22 April 2020 due to special Nine News bulletins on the Coronavirus disease 2019 occupying the program's timeslot.
38	8	"Cursed"	Julietta Boscolo	Katherine Thomson	29 April 2020	278221-38	507,000
It's a race against time to save Tara's life in the wake of her accidental overdose. To make matters worse, her parents arrive and are oblivious to her reckless lifestyle, blaming her time at Whyhope, Hugh in particular, for her behaviour. Tara is later discharged from hospital, leaving her job, and Hugh, behind. Hayley gets into her stride at the pole dancing classes, all in the while, Ajax is tormented with thoughts that she is having an affair. Meryl is having a tough day on the job as she is trying to solve an issue which she is convinced is due to the mining work, despite being told different by Jarrod. She is also stuck in the middle of the town which is torn over a newly established pole dancing bar. Charlie and Matt go on a "first date" which leads to them officially getting back together. It's Hugh's birthday and he drastically tries to avoid a celebration, although, Meryl and Hayley have organised a surprise with disastrous consequences. A drunken Hugh tells Penny he loves her.
39	9	"Octopus Trap Heart"	Kriv Stenders	Timothy Lee	6 May 2020	278221-39	488,000
Having no memory of the night before, Hugh is offered a few words of advice from Betty, but to no avail. Hayley agrees to work for Rod Eagle as manager at his new bar, The Pretty Titty, for which she sets her own conditions, while Ajax, displeased with her decision, makes her choose between him and her career. In fear of losing business, Charlie and Matt go into competition with Rod by hiring male strippers for the brewery. Meryl suffers at the hands of the town for allowing The Pretty Titty to remain open, which ultimately takes its toll on her health. For what she believed to be a near-death experience, Meryl makes Hugh promise to bring the family back together should anything happen. At first reluctant, Hugh is eventually set on a mission of redemption and makes peace with everyone. Penny, still wondering if Hugh meant what he said when he loved her, is desperate to know the truth, however, tragedy suddenly strikes when she is met with an accident.
40	10	"Ring of Fire"	Kriv Stenders	Keith Thompson	13 May 2020	278221-40	482,000
Penny narrowly survives a near-fatal accident which could have also cost the lives of a family in the other vehicle. While she is recovering in hospital, Jarrod announces that he has received a job in Broome and wishes for her to join him for which she agrees. Hugh applies for the position of hospital administrator which infuriates Penny as she believes he has done so as a means to sabotage her plans to leave. Meryl offers to raise Eliza so that Hugh can pursue his career. Hayley and Ajax contemplate the prospect of divorce due to their current circumstances as Hayley refuses to stop working for Rod. However, The Pretty Titty conveniently burns down, much to Ajax and Meryl's delight. Charlie and Matt spontaneously decide to leave Whyhope to go travelling. Penny and Hugh finally admit their love for one another, but having left it too late, Penny chooses Jarrod and flies off to Broome. A happy ending for Hugh as he is appointed hospital administrator of Whyhope Hospital.

== Reception ==
=== Ratings ===
No.	Title	Air date	Overnight ratings		Consolidated ratings		Total viewers	Ref(s)
No.	Title	Air date	Viewers	Rank	Viewers	Rank	Total viewers	Ref(s)
1	"Hugh Am I?"	5 February 2020	532,000	13	125,000	10	657,000	
2	"Don’t Stop Me Now"	12 February 2020	559,000	13	112,000	9	671,000	
3	"Self-Fulfilling Prophecies"	19 February 2020	540,000	13	106,000	11	646,000	
4	"A House Divided"	26 February 2020	525,000	13	125,000	11	650,000	
5	"The Getaway"	4 March 2020	474,000	15	148,000	12	622,000	
6	"Oh Baby"	11 March 2020	516,000	13	117,000	11	633,000	
7	"The Sum of All Our Choices"	22 April 2020	457,000	19	72,000	18	529,000	
8	"Cursed"	29 April 2020	507,000	15	117,000	15	624,000	
9	"Octopus Trap Heart"	6 May 2020	488,000	16	72,000	16	560,000	
10	"Ring of Fire"	13 May 2020	482,000	16	104,000	15	586,000	

=== Award nominations ===
AACTA Awards (2020)

- Nominated: Best Television Drama Series – Doctor Doctor

== Home media ==
Title	Country	Availability		Release	Ref(s)
Title	Country	DVD	Blu-ray	Release	Ref(s)
Doctor Doctor: Series 4	Australia	Yes	No	3 June 2020	
The Heart Guy: Series 4	United States	Yes	No	14 April 2020	
Additional
General information: 10 episodes; 1.78:1 aspect ratio; Distributor: Roadshow Entertainment (Australia); Acorn Media (United States); Discs: 3-DVD set (Australia); 3-DVD set (United States); Rating: ACB: M; Not Rated in United States; Note(s): The fourth season was intended for release on DVD in Australia on 22 April 2020, however, since the season went on hiatus on Nine Network to make way for extended coverage on COVID-19, the DVD was delayed until June 2020 so that the complete season can be aired on television before it can be released. It has not yet been announced if or when season 4 will become available on manufacture on demand (MOD) Blu-ray in the United States as the previous three seasons have since been released in that format.

== International release ==
The Drama channel in the United Kingdom was the first channel to screen the fourth season. It screened two episodes every Saturday night at 10 pm and 11 pm from 16 November 2019. Acorn TV in the United States released the fourth season in its entirety on 9 December 2019. Sveriges Television in Sweden aired the fourth season (with the show titled "Hjärtats vägar" in Swedish) with three episodes a week which started on 27 November and finished on 18 December 2019.

Episode	United Kingdom (Drama)	Sweden (STV)	United States (Acorn TV)
4-01	16 November 2019	27 November 2019	9 December 2019
4-02	16 November 2019	2 December 2019	9 December 2019
4-03	23 November 2019	3 December 2019	9 December 2019
4-04	23 November 2019	4 December 2019	9 December 2019
4-05	30 November 2019	9 December 2019	9 December 2019
4-06	30 November 2019	10 December 2019	9 December 2019
4-07	7 December 2019	11 December 2019	9 December 2019
4-08	7 December 2019	16 December 2019	9 December 2019
4-09	14 December 2019	17 December 2019	9 December 2019
4-10	14 December 2019	18 December 2019	9 December 2019
