= Doctor Doctor season 5 =

Doctor Doctor
- Season 5
- Home media release cover art
- Starring: Rodger Corser; Nicole da Silva; Ryan Johnson; Tina Bursill; Hayley McElhinney
- No. of episodes: 8

Release
- Original network: Nine Network
- Original release: 28 April – 23 June 2021

Season chronology
- ← Previous; Season 4

The fifth and final season of Doctor Doctor (known internationally as The Heart Guy), an Australian drama television series, premiered on Nine Network on 28 April 2021. The season consists of 8 episodes.

Season five features several new cast additions; including Zoe Ventoura, Lincoln Younes, Darren McMullen, John Waters, Chantelle Jamieson, Rishikesh Shukre and Contessa Treffone.

== Premise ==
The town of Whyhope is in crisis; with the recent bushfires and the COVID-19 pandemic, things are set to escalate. Hugh has decided the time has come to return to Sydney and resume his career as a heart surgeon, that is until a number of complications begin to surface, bringing his plans to a halt.

== Cast ==
=== Main ===
- Rodger Corser as Hugh Knight
- Nicole da Silva as Charlie Knight (née Pereira)
- Ryan Johnson as Matt Knight
- Tina Bursill as Meryl Knight
- Hayley McElhinney as Penny Cartwright
- Chloe Bayliss as Hayley Mills Knight
- Matt Castley as Ajax Cross Knight
- Belinda Bromilow as Betty Bell
- Charles Wu as Ken Liu
- Chantelle Jamieson as Sharna Bahit

=== Recurring ===
- Patrick Wilson as Rod Eagle
- Zoe Ventoura as Kassie
- Darren McMullen as Wes
- Coco Jack Gilles as Larry
- Jackie Hamilton as Sam
- Lincoln Younes as Tom
- John Waters as Michael
- Contessa Treffone as Melody
- Winta McGrath as Floyd Cartwright

=== Guest ===
- Marshall Napier as Bill
- Jay Laga'aia as Graeme
- Ioane Saula as Brody
- Warren Lee as Howin Liu
- Gabrielle Chan as Jing Liu
- Steve Rodgers as Warren Bostock

== Episodes ==
No. overall	No. in season	Title	Directed by	Written by	Original release date	Prod. code	Aus. viewers
41	1	"To Me, To You"	Lisa Matthews	Keith Thompson	28 April 2021	278221-41	407,000
One year has passed; Whyhope has fallen into catastrophe having been hit with drought, bushfires and floods, and to make matters worse, the hospital is under lockdown due to discovery of asbestos, while patients have been evacuated and relocated to the local veterinary hospital. Adamant that the hospital will remain closed, Hugh decides to return to Sydney. Charlie and Matt return from Germany when they discover that the Brewery has received negative reviews online. Hayley learns that it was Charlie who wrote the reviews, without Matt's knowledge, so that she could come home. Sharna Bahit arrives in Whyhope when the town is under investigation for corruption, and announces her appointment as Council Administrator, dismissing the entire council. Betty visits Penny, where it is revealed that she and Jarrod have separated and that she is determined never to return to Whyhope. Hugh later runs into Penny when a patient is transferred to Stanwell Hospital and the pair have an altercation. Meryl is arrested for misappropriation of council funds. Hugh decides to remain in Whyhope until the town is back on its feet.
42	2	"It Had to Be You"	Erin White	Timothy Lee	5 May 2021	278221-42	371,000
Meryl is desperate to avoid a prison sentence and uses any means possible to try and convince Sharna to lose all evidence connected with her corruption. Hugh and Sharna grow closer. Matt remains depressed over his return from Germany; Charlie later admits to him that it was she who wrote the negative reviews about the Brewery because she wanted to come home. Hugh and Penny clash over Kassie's palliative care when Kassie is discharged from Stanwell Hospital as she wishes to die at home with her family. Ajax employs new jackaroo, Tom, whom Hayley falls for at first sight. Penny realises she belongs in Whyhope following a conversation she had with Kassie and returns to assist Hugh at the clinic.
43	3	"The Unbearable Lightness of Being in Whyhope"	Lisa Matthews	Tamara Asmar	12 May 2021	278221-43	353,000
The Brewery hosts a fundraiser in memory of Kassie. Meryl is placed under curfew, but is however determined to attend the fundraiser in order to deliver an important speech. Penny begins to have doubts about her return to Whyhope. Sharna decides to dismiss Betty from the hospital due to cutbacks and leaves it with a reluctant Ken to break the news; before he can do so, Betty announces that she is leaving Whyhope for the Andes. Ajax begins gambling as a means to raise the money to build a family home for he, Hayley and Jimmy and therefore asks Tom to accompany Hayley at the fundraiser. The fundraiser evening almost ends in disaster when Kassie's daughter, Larry, causes an accident. Hayley puts her working relationship with Meryl to an end when she agrees to come and work for Sharna. Hugh and Sharna sleep together, as do Hayley and Tom.
44	4	"The Things We Do For Love"	Erin White	Liz Doran	19 May 2021	278221-44	368,000
Hugh and Sharna are now in a relationship but decide to keep it a secret. Following their one-night stand, Hayley struggles with her growing feelings for Tom. Ajax descends deeper into the world of gambling. A new intern secretary, Melody, begins at the hospital and is met with a mixed reception. It is announced that the hospital is to remain open, but there's a catch. Michael, an old friend of Meryl's, arrives in Whyhope to represent her when she is informed that she will most certainly serve a prison sentence; it is also discovered that he was the influence for Hugh's reckless behaviour as a teenager. On a night out, Michael has a health scare and Hugh sees the irresponsible side of Penny. Matt's plans to propose to Charlie are thwarted when she rushes to comfort a grieving Wes. Meryl and Michael band together in the hope of bringing down Sharna.
45	5	"Scream The Impossible Scream"	Daniel Nettheim	Mithila Gupta	26 May 2021	278221-45	390,000
It's Father's Day and Meryl organises a special dinner in honour of Jim combined with what could be her last supper. Ken's parents arrive in Whyhope for which he reveals that he lied to them about being a doctor. Penny tries to help a patient who has attempted to take his own life. Matt discovers that Ajax is having money troubles. Hayley manages to break all ten commandments in one day and to make matters worse, Tom admits his love for her which prompts her to tell Ajax the truth after they almost sleep together a second time. Meryl and Michael stumble upon some incriminating information that could jeopardize Sharna's career, which Meryl lets slip at the family dinner, forcing Hugh to choose between his girlfriend and his mother.
46	6	"Feelings, Corruption and Taking a Stand"	Hattie Dalton	Angela McDonald	2 June 2021	278221-46	399,000
The day of Meryl's court case arrives and upon realising that Hugh is in love with Sharna, she decides to back down against Sharna for which she is sentenced to 100 hours community service. Charlie questions Hugh on the possibility that Michael could be his father. Charlie is offered the position of Mayor of Whyhope. Ajax fires Tom when he discovers that his love for Hayley is mutual. Matt finally uncovers Ajax's secret gambling addiction. Sharna announces that she has been recalled to Sydney and wishes for Hugh to join her. The hospital makes a desperate attempt to see 110 patients in one day in order gain funding, however, when they fail to make the numbers, Penny reveals that she sabotaged the quota so that Hugh would stay, an action that she later regrets and admits her mistake. Hugh decides to leave Whyhope now that the hospital will be up and running again.
47	7	"Promises, Promises"	Catherine Millar	Timothy Lee	16 June 2021	278221-47	437,000
Ajax struggles to come to terms with he and Hayley's separation and he asks her keep it secret from the family for the time being. Charlie is appointed Interim Administrator of the council, much to Hayley's chagrin. Meryl agrees to go on a date with Michael and suddenly becomes frustrated with his desire to relive the past. Penny's son Floyd runs away from boarding school in Sydney and returns to Whyhope. Hugh sees that Floyd gets back to school when he, Sharna and Matt attend an event in Sydney; Hugh assists a cardiac operation, which is a success, while Matt is on business associated with the Brewery. Hugh soon feels embarrassed by Matt and the pair get into a fight. In an attempt to get back with Hayley, Ajax reveals his gambling addiction to her in the hope that she will see that they both made mistakes, but to no avail. Floyd goes missing again, but is later located and explains why he ran away. En route back to Whyhope, a bout of turbulence forces Hugh to reveal to Floyd his love for Penny. Upon landing, Hugh discovers that he has been offered a job in Sydney which he accepts.
48	8	"Save The Best Till Last"	Catherine Millar	Keith Thompson	23 June 2021	278221-48	516,000
Meryl and Michael are finally an item. Hayley takes into consideration that her separation to Ajax may have been too soon and that their problems may have been in the bedroom. Charlie is backed into a corner while trying to fulfill her duties to the council, she is faced with the pressure of committing corruption. Matt decides to turn down the offer of $2,000,000 so that Arcadia Brewery can remain a family business. Penny discovers why Floyd ran away from boarding school. Sharna is beginning to feel insecure about her relationship with Hugh and confronts Penny who tries to convince her that there is nothing between them. Hugh packs up and moves to Sydney. Matt and Charlie propose to one another and eventually get (re)married. Hugh returns from the city for the wedding and makes the surprise announcement that he has returned to Whyhope for good; he and Penny ultimately confess their love for each other. Meryl is now free as she completes her community service and she and Michael go for a carefree drive, passing the sign which reads "Thank You for Visiting Whyhope".

== Production ==
Doctor Doctor was commissioned for a fifth season on 31 March 2020 and was the first Australian drama series to be renewed amid the COVID-19 pandemic. Filming commenced on 28 September 2020, where social distancing requirements had been put in place.

== Reception ==
=== Ratings ===
No.	Title	Air date	Overnight ratings		Consolidated ratings		Total viewers	Ref(s)
No.	Title	Air date	Viewers	Rank	Viewers	Rank	Total viewers	Ref(s)
1	"To Me, To You"	28 April 2021	407,000	17	86,000	15	493,000	
2	"It Had to Be You"	5 May 2021	371,000	17	89,000	15	460,000	
3	"The Unbearable Lightness of Being in Whyhope"	12 May 2021	353,000	19	74,000	17	427,000	
4	"The Things We Do For Love"	19 May 2021	368,000	18	71,000	17	439,000	
5	"Scream The Impossible Scream"	26 May 2021	390,000	17	88,000	16	478,000	
6	"Feelings, Corruption and Taking a Stand"	2 June 2021	399,000	17	71,000	17	470,000	
7	"Promises, Promises"	16 June 2021	437,000	17	67,000	15	504,000	
8	"Save The Best Till Last"	23 June 2021	516,000	13	65,000	12	581,000	

=== Awards and nominations ===
Logie Awards (2022)

- Nominated: Logie Award for Most Popular Actor – Roger Corser
- Nominated: Logie Award for Most Popular Drama Program

Screen Producers Australia Awards (2022)

- Nominated: SPA Award for Drama Series Production of the Year

== Home media ==
Title	Country	Availability		Release	Ref(s)
Title	Country	DVD	Blu-ray	Release	Ref(s)
Doctor Doctor: Series 5	Australia	Yes	No	4 August 2021	
The Heart Guy: Series 5	United States	Yes	No	26 October 2021	
Additional
General information: 2-DVD set; 8 episodes; 1.78:1 aspect ratio; 400 minutes; Distributor: Roadshow Entertainment (Australia); Rating: ACB: M

== International release ==
Episode	United States (Acorn TV)	United Kingdom (Drama)	Sweden (STV)
5-01	26 July 2021	12 March 2022	TBA
5-02	26 July 2021	12 March 2022	TBA
5-03	26 July 2021	19 March 2022	TBA
5-04	26 July 2021	19 March 2022	TBA
5-05	26 July 2021	26 March 2022	TBA
5-06	26 July 2021	26 March 2022	TBA
5-07	26 July 2021	2 April 2022	TBA
5-08	26 July 2021	2 April 2022	TBA
