= Doctor Doctor (Australian TV series) =

Australian television drama series

- Opening title
- Also known as: The Heart Guy (international)
- Genre: Drama; Comedy drama Medical drama
- Created by: Tony McNamara; Ian Collie; Alan Harris
- Written by: List: Tony McNamara; Alice Bell; Tamara Asmar; Liz Doran; Angela McDonald; Gretel Vella; Timothy Lee; Keith Thompson; Josh Mapleston; Mithila Gupta; Katherine Thomson
- Directed by: List: Peter Salmon; Jeremy Sims; Kriv Stenders; Ian Watson; Tori Garrett; Lucy Gaffy; Ben Chessell; Geoff Bennett; Jennifer Lacey; Lisa Matthews; Erin White; Julietta Boscolo
- Starring: Rodger Corser; Nicole da Silva; Ryan Johnson; Tina Bursill; Steve Bisley; Hayley McElhinney; Chloe Bayliss; Matt Castley; Belinda Bromilow; Shalom Brune-Franklin; Charles Wu; Brittany Scott Clark; Miranda Tapsell; Kate Jenkinson; Dustin Clare; Chantelle Jamieson
- Opening theme: "Going Up the Country" by Patience Hodgson
- Composers: Antony Partos; Dave McCormack
- Country of origin: Australia
- Original language: English
- No. of seasons: 5
- No. of episodes: 48 (list of episodes)

Production
- Executive producers: Andy Ryan; Jo Rooney
- Producers: Ian Collie; Claudia Karvan; Tony McNamara; Ally Henville; Keith Thompson; Rodger Corser
- Production locations: Sydney; Mudgee; Camden; Rozelle
- Camera setup: Single-camera
- Running time: 45 minutes
- Production company: EQ Media Group

Original release
- Network: Nine Network
- Release: 14 September 2016 – 23 June 2021

Doctor Doctor (also known outside of Australasia as The Heart Guy) is an Australian television drama created by Tony McNamara, Ian Collie and Alan Harris, which premiered on the Nine Network on 14 September 2016, lasting five seasons, concluding on 23 June 2021. The cast includes Rodger Corser, Nicole da Silva, Ryan Johnson, Tina Bursill, Hayley McElhinney and Steve Bisley, and follows the story of Hugh Knight, a rising heart surgeon who is gifted, charming and infallible. He is a hedonist who, due to his sheer talent, believes he can live outside the rules. His "work hard, play harder" philosophy eventually comes to 'bite' him. The series was originally produced by Essential Media & Entertainment and Easy Tiger Productions in association with Screen NSW. Andy Ryan and Jo Rooney served as executive producers.

Doctor Doctor has been positively received throughout its run and has also achieved success outside of Australia in countries such as New Zealand, United States, United Kingdom and Sweden. A ratings success for Nine Network, the series has occasionally been the highest-rated drama on Australian television, peaking at 854,000 during its first season. The series finale was watched by 516,000 viewers. It has been nominated for several awards, including 15 Logie Awards and three AACTA Awards.

== Premise ==
After a fall from grace, high-flying heart surgeon Dr Hugh Knight receives a life-changing punishment from the Medical Tribunal - he is forced to work for a year as a country general practitioner (GP) in his former home town of Whyhope. Now the only way to salvage his career is to work as a lowly GP in an under-resourced, small-town hospital surrounded by estranged family, former friends, crazed colleagues, oddball patients, jealous brothers and a newlywed ex-girlfriend.

== Production ==
=== Conception ===
The series entered pre-production in early 2016, with executive producers Andy Ryan and Jo Rooney of the Nine Network and Ian Collie, Claudia Karvan and Tony McNamara of Essential Media & Entertainment. The Nine Network confirmed that Doctor Doctor would commence production in April 2016 with filming taking place in Sydney and regional New South Wales. In a statement, Nine's Head of Drama, Jo Rooney and Andy Ryan, commented "We are delighted to join forces with Essential Media & Entertainment on the irreverent new family drama series". Inspiration for the series came from discussions that Tony McNamara had with lawyers who talked with him about the Impaired Registrants Program, a practice operated by the Medical Council of New South Wales, which seeks to ensure that medical practitioners are fit for practice and in doing so, the program manages doctors who suffer from a psychiatric illness, self-administration of drugs, alcohol abuse, and physical illness. The series was produced by Essential Media and Entertainment and its first season created 800 jobs and production expenditure of $11.6 million in Sydney and Mudgee, as well as $300,000 in grants from Screen NSW.

The series premiered on Nine Network on the earlier-than-expected broadcast date of 14 September 2016, and in the process, post-production of the ten-episode season was rushed. On 28 September 2016, prior to the broadcast of episode three, Nine renewed the series for a second season, due to its growing success. Ian Collie commented, "We love how the national audience has taken to Doctor Doctor. It’s a show with heart and smarts and thrilled that Nine are backing us to go again. Roll on season two!" On 11 October 2017, it was announced that the show was renewed for a third season at Nine Upfronts for the 2018 schedule. Doctor Doctor was renewed for a fourth season, which was confirmed on 17 October 2018, and went into production in April 2019. The season was set to premiere sometime in late 2019, however, it was announced on 16 October 2019, that it would premiere in 2020. On 31 March 2020, Nine announced that Doctor Doctor has been commissioned for a fifth season.

Doctor Doctor was renewed for a fifth season in April 2020, with production beginning on 28 September and wrapping up in mid December 2020. In June 2021, Nine announced the series would end after the fifth season concludes.

=== Casting ===
The casting director of Doctor Doctor is Kirsty McGregor, who has worked for casting on popular television series, such as Modern Family and Top of the Lake. It was announced in early 2016 that Rodger Corser had received the leading role in the series as heart surgeon, Hugh Knight, before the Nine Network has formally announced the series. Corser was still appearing on the ABC drama series The Doctor Blake Mysteries, for which he only appeared in Season 4 in 2016, and of the role he said that "he was enjoying playing a different style of character to those he had previously played." It was then confirmed that Nicole Da Silva would be cast in the role of Charlie Knight. Da Silva was currently filming the fourth season of Wentworth, appearing only for six of the twelve episodes and in a supporting status, due to her new starring role in Doctor Doctor, she had to travel between Sydney and Melbourne switching between roles. It had also seen her reconnect with her former Rush co-star, Rodger Corser. Tina Bursill was cast in the role of matriarch Meryl Knight; Bursill had not appeared in a production for two years and was a carer for her father. Following his death, Bursill was contacted six weeks later and asked to audition for the role. In an early announcement, it was stated that additional supporting cast would consist of Ryan Johnson, Hayley McElhinney, Shalom Brune-Franklin, Chloe Bayliss and Dave Eastgate It was later revealed that Steve Bisley would appear in the series as Jim Knight.

For the second season of Doctor Doctor, it was announced that Packed to the Rafters star Angus McLaren would join the cast as ex-army medic, Dr Toke, after a three-year hiatus from acting in television, while it had also been confirmed that New Zealand actress, Brittany Scott Clark, formerly of soap opera Shortland Street, would portray Nurse Mia Holston.

Ahead of Season 3, during a promo which screened in June 2018 on the Nine Network, it was revealed that the show would be losing a major character; in a spoiler, it was revealed to be Jim Knight. In May 2018, it was announced, that Steve Bisley would be returning for the third season, however, he only appeared in the opening episode.

In April 2019, it was announced that Dustin Clare, Kate Jenkinson and Robyn Nevin would be joining the cast of Doctor Doctor for its fourth season.

In September 2020, several new cast additions were announced for the fifth season; they include, Zoe Ventoura, Lincoln Younes, Darren McMullen, John Waters, Chantelle Jamieson, Rishikesh Shukre and Contessa Treffone.

=== Filming ===
The series is filmed on location in Mudgee, a town in the Central West of New South Wales, while the entirety of the hospital scenes are shot in the Inner West Sydney suburb of Rozelle. The filming of Knight's home was shot in Sydney's south-west section in the town of Camden. The regional setting for the series has proved to be beneficial for narrative and production purposes. It has been stated that in addition to $100,000 worth of support from the Regional Filming Fund, the regional setting delivers a unique authenticity to the series that it would otherwise lack. Due to the success of the first season, The Knight's home, which was filmed in an actual house, was recreated within a disused wing of the building used to film the hospital scenes from the second season onwards; this was due to limited space in the original home.

In 2017, Ian Collie departed Essential Media in order to establish his own production company, Easy Tiger Tiger, from which Doctor Doctor was produced under as of its second season. The company was majority owned by FremantleMedia.

Doctor Doctor was the first Australian drama series to be renewed amid the COVID-19 pandemic. Filming for the fifth season commenced on 28 September 2020 and wrapped in December 2020. During which time, social distancing requirements had been put in place so that filming could continue.

=== Theme song ===
The theme song is a cover version of the American band Canned Heat song Going Up the Country, performed by Patience Hodgson of the Australian indie/alternative rock band The Grates. The song is not available for international airings of the series as the opening theme is replaced with the same instrumental music which is used over the end credits.

== Cast and characters ==
=== Main ===
- Rodger Corser as Hugh Knight, a drug-abusing, self-sabotaging heart surgeon placed on probation for his reckless behaviour and banished to the rural town of Whyhope, which incidentally happens to be his hometown, and is forced to practice as local G.P.
- Nicole da Silva as Charlie Perreira Knight, a local primary school teacher, once Hugh's girlfriend, she is now married to his brother Matt. She is also the author of science-fiction novels.
- Ryan Johnson as Matt Knight, Hugh's younger brother and husband to Charlie, he is the owner of Whyhope's Arcadia Brewery aside from running the family farm. He suddenly feels threatened when he's convinced he must compete with his brother for Charlie's love.
- Tina Bursill as Meryl Knight, matriarch of the Knight family and member of the local council, she strives at any means possible to become appointed as town mayor. Caring yet sarcastic, she will do the best she can to keep her family together
- Hayley McElhinney as Penny Cartwright, the Hospital Administrator of Whyhope Hospital and Hugh's supervisor. Penny holds the Hospital together and when Hugh arrives, she is forced to do the same with him. His future of resuming as a heart surgeon lays in her hands.
- Chloe Bayliss as Hayley Mills Knight, devoutly religious and committed to boyfriend Ajax, she holds her morals high, is caring and is often outspoken
- Matt Castley as Ajax Cross Knight adopted by the Knights at the age of six, he is high-spirited and optimistic. A shocking secret regarding his parentage will change his life forever.
- Belinda Bromilow as Betty Bell, a good-natured, recovering alcoholic, she is the hospital receptionist, offering everyone unsolicited advice on love and life. She speaks fluent Norwegian. (season 1–5)
- Shalom Brune-Franklin as Aoife (season 1, guest season 2)
- Charles Wu as Ken Liu
- Steve Bisley as Jim Knight, Meryl's devoted husband, he has struggled to see eye-to-eye with Hugh after leaving the family homestead for the city to become a heart surgeon. (season 1–2, guest season 3)
- Brittany Scott Clark as Mia Holston, a new nurse at Whyhope Hospital and Aoife's replacement. (season 2–3)
- Miranda Tapsell as April, an old schoolmate of Matt's; she is desperate to have a baby, but doesn't have a boyfriend. When Charlie and Matt decide to separate, April sets her sight on Matt as a potential love interest. (recurring season 3, main season 4)
- Kate Jenkinson as Tara Khourdair, placed on probation as a G.P. at Whyhope Hospital for her reckless ways, much like how Hugh first arrived, he is now forced to supervise her; she hides a traumatizing secret from her past. (season 4)
- Dustin Clare as Jarrod, a mine contractor, new boyfriend and later fiancé to Penny. He becomes increasingly jealous as he knows that Hugh is in love with Penny. (season 4)
- Chantelle Jamieson as Sharna Bahit, Whyhope Council Administrator investigating the council for corruption and also Hugh's new love interest. (season 5)

=== Supporting ===
- Patrick Wilson as Rod Eagle
- Vanessa Buckley as Kimberley
- John Batchelor as Nathan Eagle (season 1)
- Dave Eastgate as Joey Higgins (season 1)
- Lucy Durack as Chantelle ‘Tugger’ Waugh (seasons 1–2)
- Winta McGrath as Floyd Cartwright (seasons 1–3, 5)
- Angus McLaren as Dr. Carl Toke (season 2)
- Archie Christian Chee as Kent (season 2)
- Helen Thomson as Nora Gumbleton (season 2)
- Jacek Koman as Trevor (season 2)
- Susan Prior as Minnie (season 2)
- Uli Latukefu as Darren Ngata (season 2–4)
- Ella Scott Lynch as Celia (seasons 2, 4)
- Anabel Wolfe as Ivy (season 3)
- Genevieve Hegney as Harriet (season 3)
- Alan Dukes as Glen (season 3–present)
- Robyn Nevin as Dinah (season 4)
- Thomas Swords as Papa Pex (season 4)
- Tim Potter as Eddie (season 4)
- Vince Colosimo as Carlito (season 3)
- Zoe Carides as Mayor Nancy (season 4)
- Coco Jack Gilles as Larry (season 5)
- Contessa Teffone as Melody (season 5)
- Darren McMullen as Wes (season 5)
- Jackie Hamilton as Sam (season 5)
- John Waters as Michael (season 5)
- Lincoln Younes as Tom (season 5)
- Marshall Napier as Bill (season 5)
- Zoe Ventoura as Kassie (season 5)

== Broadcast ==
Doctor Doctor was broadcast on the Nine Network on Wednesday nights 8.40 pm during its first two seasons; it was moved to Monday nights at 8.40 pm for its third season. Nine originally planned to air Season 4 in 2019, however it later delayed the broadcast to 5 February 2020. In October 2019, it was announced that the fourth season would premiere on the United Kingdom's Drama channel on 16 November 2019 before it aired in Australia. It returned to Wednesday nights in a 9.00 pm timeslot for its fourth season. The fourth season went on hiatus for six weeks in Australia to make way for special Nine News reports on the COVID-19 pandemic. It returned in April 2020 with its seventh episode in a new 7.30 pm timeslot. The fifth season premiered on 28 April 2021 in the Wednesday night 8.30 pm timeslot. In June 2021, ahead of the final two episodes of season five, it was announced that the series would end after its five-year run.

The series is also available on demand from 9Now.

=== International ===
It premiered in New Zealand on 3 May 2017 on TVNZ 1, where it is broadcast Wednesday nights at 8.30 pm.

The series, which is internationally re-titled as The Heart Guy, airs on pay television broadcaster Sky Deutschland for Germany, Austria and Switzerland. In Norway the series are available on TV2 Sumo. The program is also available in the United States with the title The Heart Guy, where new episodes premiere on the streaming network Acorn TV and are broadcast for free on many PBS local affiliates.

In the United Kingdom, the series premiered on 8 April 2018 on Drama Channel where it was broadcast Sunday nights at 8 pm. The second season began airing on 17 June 2018, while the third season commenced broadcast on 10 March 2019. Having secured the rights to screen the fourth season, it premiered on Drama on 16 November 2019, in a new 10 pm timeslot on Saturday nights, where it aired double episodes each week. The fifth and final season will commence on Drama on 12 March 2022 in a Saturday night 11 pm timeslot. It is available for catch-up streaming in the UK on UKTV Play.

Persian expat Manoto aired the first season from October 2018 for Iran, Afghanistan and Tajikistan.

== Episodes ==
Season	Episodes	Originally released	
Season	Episodes	First released	Last released
1	10	14 September 2016	16 November 2016
2	10	16 August 2017	18 October 2017
3	10	6 August 2018	8 October 2018
4	10	5 February 2020	13 May 2020
5	8	28 April 2021	23 June 2021

== Reception ==
=== Critical reception ===
Reviews for the series have been generally positive. In a review from Debi Enker for the Sydney Morning Herald, she stated that in contrast of other medical dramas it "Takes a different approach. It's gentler, funnier, and it's set in the country." Steve Molk of DeciderTV mentioned that "Doctor Doctor is dependable, honest and sincere Aussie Drama with a full cast stronger than has been seen in a long time." In a review for the online website, The Medium is Not Enough, the series was given a more mixed reception, when it was criticized for becoming more serious following the first episode with a mix of humour in turns; mentioning "If you're going to get serious then you need to do it consistently, not just in bits you like." However it was said of the series that "A decent enough show with potential that’s already been rewarded with a second season, Doctor Doctor nevertheless needs to look hard at what it wants to be in life if it’s to avoid losing patience." David Hinckley of the website TV Worth Watching gave the series a positive review prior to its premiere on Acorn TV in the United States, commenting that "The Heart Guy doesn't seem to have much of one, but the show does" and compared it somewhat to British drama Doc Martin.

=== Award nominations ===
Doctor Doctor has been nominated for several awards throughout its run. At the AACTA Awards, Tina Bursill has been nominated twice in 2017 and 2018 in the categories of Best Guest or Supporting Actress in a Television Drama and Best Lead Actress in a Television Drama respectively, while in 2020, the series was nominated for Best Television Drama Series.

It has received a total of 17 nominations at the Logie Awards, with Rodger Corser being the nominee for three Gold Logie Awards for Most Popular Personality on Australian Television, four Silver Logie Awards for Most Popular Actor, and two Silver Logie Awards for Most Outstanding Actor. The series has been nominated for four Logie Awards for Most Popular Drama Program, and two Logie Awards for Most Outstanding Drama Series, while other award nominations consist of the Logie Awards for Most Outstanding Supporting Actor (Ryan Johnson), and Logie Award for Most Popular New Talent (Shalom Brune-Franklin).

Additional nominations come from the Casting Guild of Australia, the Screen Producers Australia, and TV Tonight.

=== Honours ===
In 2023, Rodger Corser's Hugh Knight was honoured as part of TV Week's 100 Greatest Australia TV Characters, ranking at 34 on the list.

In August 2026, Doctor Doctor ranked 44th place in TV Week's 70 Best Australian TV Shows of All Time.

=== Ratings ===
Season	Timeslot (Australian)	# Ep.	First aired		Last aired		Rank	Avg. viewers (thousands)
Season	Timeslot (Australian)	# Ep.	Date	Viewers (thousands)	Date	Viewers (thousands)	Rank	Avg. viewers (thousands)
1	Wednesday 8:40 pm	10	14 September 2016	759	16 November 2016	785	8	777
2	Wednesday 8:40 pm	10	16 August 2017	758	18 October 2017	735	10	721
3	Monday 8:40 pm	10	6 August 2018	726	8 October 2018	642	N/A	619
4	Wednesday 9:00 pm (1–6); Wednesday 7:30 pm (7–10)	10	5 February 2020	532	13 May 2020	482	15	515
5	Wednesday 8:30 pm	8	28 April 2021	407	23 June 2021	516	17	398

== Home media ==
Title	Release date				Features
Title	Region 1 DVD	Region A Blu-ray (MOD)	Region 2 DVD (Germany)	Region 4 DVD	Features
Series 1	19 September 2017	16 April 2019	25 August 2017	23 November 2016	10 episodes; 3–DVD set; 2–Blu-ray set; Released as "The Heart Guy" in United States and Germany; Ratings: FSK–12; ACB – MA15+
Series 2	26 June 2018	16 April 2019	23 March 2018	6 December 2017	10 episodes; 3–DVD set; 2–Blu-ray set; Released as "The Heart Guy" in United States and Germany; Ratings: FSK – 12; ACB – M
Series 1 & 2	—N/a	—N/a	—N/a	6 December 2017	20 episodes; 6–DVD set; Ratings: ACB – MA15+
Series 3	2 April 2019	23 April 2019	—N/a	21 November 2018	10 episodes; 3–DVD set; 2–Blu-ray set; Released as "The Heart Guy" in United States; Ratings: ACB – M
Series 1–3	—N/a	—N/a	—N/a	5 December 2018	30 episodes; 9–DVD set; Ratings: ACB – MA15+
Series 4	14 April 2020	—N/a	—N/a	3 June 2020	10 episodes; 3 DVD-set (Australia); 4 DVD-set (U.S.); Released as "The Heart Guy" in United States; Ratings: ACB – M
Series 5	26 October 2021	—N/a	—N/a	4 August 2021	8 episodes; 2 DVD-set; Ratings: ACB – M

== See also ==
- List of Australian television series
- List of medical drama television programs
