= List of Doctor Doctor (Australian TV series) episodes =

Doctor Doctor (outside of Australasia known as The Heart Guy) is an Australian drama series. It premiered on Nine Network on 14 September 2016. The series follows Hugh Knight (Rodger Corser), a heart surgeon, who is punished for a number of mishaps and is put on probation and forced to work in the country town of Whyhope for a year as a G.P., which coincidentally happens to be his hometown.

During the course of the series, 48 episodes of Doctor Doctor aired over five seasons, between 14 September 2016 and 23 June 2021.

== Series overview ==
Season	Episodes	Originally released	
Season	Episodes	First released	Last released
1	10	14 September 2016	16 November 2016
2	10	16 August 2017	18 October 2017
3	10	6 August 2018	8 October 2018
4	10	5 February 2020	13 May 2020
5	8	28 April 2021	23 June 2021

== Episodes ==
=== Season 1 (2016) ===
No. overall	No. in season	Title	Directed by	Written by	Original release date	Prod. code	Aus. viewers
1	1	"Doctor Doctor"	Peter Salmon	Tony McNamara	14 September 2016	278221-1	759,000
2	2	"Home Sweet Home"	Peter Salmon	Tony McNamara	21 September 2016	278221-2	821,000
3	3	"San Francisco"	Jeremy Sims	Tony McNamara	28 September 2016	278221-3	661,000
4	4	"I Need Another Drink, Said Not Me Last Night!"	Jeremy Sims	Alice Bell	5 October 2016	278221-4	763,000
5	5	"We Don't Need Another Hero"	Kriv Stenders	Liz Doran	12 October 2016	278221-5	826,000
6	6	"Golden Harvest"	Kriv Stenders	Tamara Asmar	19 October 2016	278221-6	854,000
7	7	"This is Not a Love Song"	Peter Salmon	Liz Doran	26 October 2016	278221-7	777,000
8	8	"The Truth is Out There"	Peter Salmon	Tony McNamara	2 November 2016	278221-8	819,000
9	9	"Say Sayonara"	Jeremy Sims	Tamara Asmar	9 November 2016	278221-9	707,000
10	10	"Mash"	Jeremy Sims	Tony McNamara	16 November 2016	278221-10	785,000

=== Season 2 (2017) ===
No. overall	No. in season	Title	Directed by	Written by	Original release date	Prod. code	Aus. viewers
11	1	"What Difference the Day Makes"	Ian Watson	Tony McNamara	16 August 2017	278221-11	758,000
12	2	"Your Game"	Ian Watson	Tony McNamara	23 August 2017	278221-12	690,000
13	3	"Talent Showdown"	Tori Garrett	Angela McDonald	30 August 2017	278221-13	632,000
14	4	"The Great Campaign"	Tori Garrett	Liz Doran	6 September 2017	278221-14	704,000
15	5	"Both Sides Now"	Kriv Stenders	Tony McNamara	13 September 2017	278221-15	761,000
16	6	"Penny for Your Thoughts"	Kriv Stenders	Tony McNamara	20 September 2017	278221-16	645,000
17	7	"Picture of Innocence"	Lucy Gaffy	Tony McNamara	27 September 2017	278221-17	749,000
18	8	"Step in Time"	Ian Watson	Tamara Asmar	4 October 2017	278221-18	790,000
19	9	"Forgive and Forget"	Ben Chessell	Tony McNamara	11 October 2017	278221-19	745,000
20	10	"A Little Piece of Heaven"	Ben Chessell	Tony McNamara	18 October 2017	278221-20	735,000

=== Season 3 (2018) ===
No. overall	No. in season	Title	Directed by	Written by	Original release date	Prod. code	Aus. viewers
21	1	"Tell Her, It's Over!"	Geoff Bennett	Tony McNamara	6 August 2018	278221-21	726,000
22	2	"Isn't She Lovely"	Geoff Bennett	Tony McNamara	13 August 2018	278221-22	671,000
23	3	"Shock Rock"	Lucy Gaffy	Liz Doran	20 August 2018	278221-23	684,000
24	4	"Runaway Baby"	Lucy Gaffy	Tamara Asmar	27 August 2018	278221-24	639,000
25	5	"When We Collide"	Ian Watson	Gretel Vella	3 September 2018	278221-25	647,000
26	6	"Call Me Irresponsible"	Ian Watson	Timothy Lee	10 September 2018	278221-26	631,000
27	7	"Don't Wanna Let You Go"	Jennifer Leacey	Angela McDonald	17 September 2018	278221-27	667,000
28	8	"Wet Weekends"	Lisa Matthews	Liz Doran	24 September 2018	278221-28	315,000
29	9	"Suspicious Minds"	Ben Chessell & Lucy Gaffy	Angela McDonald & Gretel Vella	1 October 2018	278221-29	565,000
30	10	"No Laughing Matter"	Ben Chessell & Lucy Gaffy	Tony McNamara	8 October 2018	278221-30	642,000

=== Season 4 (2020) ===
No. overall	No. in season	Title	Directed by	Written by	Original Aus. air date	Prod. code	Aus. viewers
31	1	"Hugh Am I?"	Geoff Bennett	Keith Thompson	5 February 2020	278221-31	532,000
32	2	"Don't Stop Me Now"	Lisa Matthews	Liz Doran	12 February 2020	278221-32	559,000
33	3	"Self-Fulfilling Prophecies"	Geoff Bennett	Timothy Lee	19 February 2020	278221-33	540,000
34	4	"A House Divided"	Lisa Matthews	Angela McDonald	26 February 2020	278221-34	525,000
35	5	"The Getaway"	Erin White	Josh Mapleston	4 March 2020	278221-35	474,000
36	6	"Oh Baby"	Erin White	Grettel Vella	11 March 2020	278221-36	516,000
37	7	"The Sum of All Our Choices"	Geoff Bennett	Mithila Gupta	22 April 2020	278221-37	457,000
38	8	"Cursed"	Julietta Boscolo	Katherine Thomson	29 April 2020	278221-38	507,000
39	9	"Octopus Trap Heart"	Kriv Stenders	Timothy Lee	6 May 2020	278221-39	488,000
40	10	"Ring of Fire"	Kriv Stenders	Keith Thompson	13 May 2020	278221-40	482,000

=== Season 5 (2021) ===
No. overall	No. in season	Title	Directed by	Written by	Original release date	Prod. code	Aus. viewers
41	1	"To Me, To You"	Lisa Matthews	Keith Thompson	28 April 2021	278221-41	407,000
42	2	"It Had to Be You"	Erin White	Timothy Lee	5 May 2021	278221-42	371,000
43	3	"The Unbearable Lightness of Being in Whyhope"	Lisa Matthews	Tamara Asmar	12 May 2021	278221-43	353,000
44	4	"The Things We Do For Love"	Erin White	Liz Doran	19 May 2021	278221-44	368,000
45	5	"Scream The Impossible Scream"	Daniel Nettheim	Mithila Gupta	26 May 2021	278221-45	390,000
46	6	"Feelings, Corruption and Taking a Stand"	Hattie Dalton	Angela McDonald	2 June 2021	278221-46	399,000
47	7	"Promises, Promises"	Catherine Millar	Timothy Lee	16 June 2021	278221-47	437,000
48	8	"Save The Best Till Last"	Catherine Millar	Keith Thompson	23 June 2021	278221-48	516,000

== Ratings ==
Doctor Doctor : Australia viewers per episode (thousands)

Season	Episode number										Average
Season	1	2	3	4	5	6	7	8	9	10	Average
1	759	821	661	763	826	854	777	819	707	785	777
2	758	690	632	704	761	645	749	790	745	735	721
3	726	671	684	639	647	631	667	315	565	642	619
4	532	559	540	525	474	516	457	507	488	482	515
5	407	371	353	368	390	399	437	516	–		398

Source: Audience measurement performed by OzTam
