= After the Verdict (TV series) =

2022 Australian television series

- Genre: Comedy drama; Crime; Thriller
- Created by: Ellie Beaumont; Drew Proffitt
- Written by: Ellie Beaumont; Drew Proffitt; Romina Accurso
- Directed by: Peter Salmon; Lisa Matthews; Ben C Lucas; Fadia Abboud
- Starring: Lincoln Younes; Sullivan Stapleton; Magda Szubanski; Michelle Lim Davidson
- Composer: Michael Yezerski
- Country of origin: Australia
- Original language: English
- No. of series: 1
- No. of episodes: 6

Production
- Executive producers: Ellie Beaumont; Drew Proffitt; Greg Stitch; Andy Ryan
- Producer: Jo Rooney
- Cinematography: Nicholas Owens
- Camera setup: Multi-camera
- Running time: 44-48 minutes
- Production company: Subtext Pictures

Original release
- Network: Nine Network
- Release: 10 August – 14 September 2022

After the Verdict is a six-part Australian comedy drama television series which premiered on Nine Network on 10 August 2022.

== Premise ==
Four people finish jury duty on a high-profile murder case. Once back in their regular day-to-day lives, they start to question their verdict and begin their own investigations which then impacts their personal lives.

== Production ==
The series was first announced at Nine's 2022 upfronts in September 2021, Lincoln Younes, Sullivan Stapleton, Michelle Davidson and Magda Szubanski were confirmed to star in the series.

== Cast ==
- Lincoln Younes as Ollie
- Sullivan Stapleton as Daniel
- Magda Szubanski as Margie
- Michelle Lim Davidson as Clara
- Tess Haubrich as Heidi Lang
- Nicholas Brown as Paul
- Coco Jack Gillies as Zoe
- Richard Brancatisano as Dom
- Vivienne Awosaga as Tamara
- Emma Diaz as Eliza
- Virginia Gay as Trish
- Hazem Shammas as Detective Sarti
- Brielle Flynn as Detective Mills
- Holly Leonard as Mia
- Hudson Fisher as Jamie
- Michael Beckley as Vincent Lang
- Raelee Hill as Belinda

== Episodes ==
No.	Title	Directed by	Written by	Original release date	Australian viewers
1	"Episode 1"	Peter Salmon	Ellie Beaumont & Drew Proffitt	10 August 2022	409,000
After their verdict of 'not guilty', four jurors on a murder trial wonder if they made a terrible mistake. Have they let a killer walk free?
2	"Episode 2"	Peter Salmon	Ellie Beaumont & Drew Proffitt	17 August 2022	367,000
Clara sees accused killer Heidi in a new light when they are both targeted by a dangerous stalker. Daniel's secretive behaviour takes a deadly twist.
3	"Episode 3"	Ben C. Lucas	Ellie Beaumont & Drew Proffitt	24 August 2022	311,000
Clara investigates a new suspect in Belinda's murder - her husband. Daniel makes a shocking confession about the murder trial.
4	"Episode 4"	Ben C. Lucas	Ellie Beaumont & Drew Proffitt	31 August 2022	287,000
Clara uncovers a chilling secret from Heidi's past. The murder investigation threatens to ruin Margie's wedding plans.
5	"Episode 5"	Fadia Abboud	Ellie Beaumont, Drew Proffitt & Romina Accurso	7 September 2022	300,000
Clara risks losing her children, as the jurors discover the motive behind Belinda's murder. Daniel makes a desperate deal to force a new murder trial for Heidi.
6	"Episode 6"	Fadia Abboud	Ellie Beaumont & Drew Proffitt	14 September 2022	325,000
With Daniel and Clara framed as criminals, the jurors make a final attempt to get justice before it's too late.
