= Lincoln Younes =

Australian actor (born 1992)

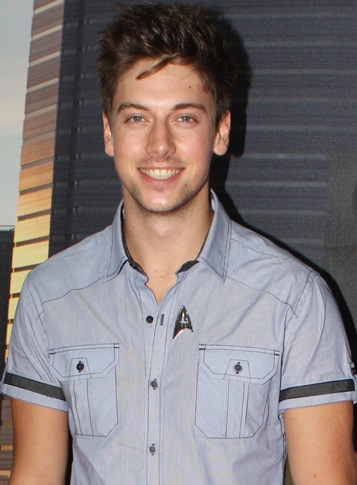
- Lincoln Younes at the premiere of Star Trek Into Darkness in 2013.
- Born: 31 January 1992 (age 34); Sydney, Australia
- Occupation: Actor
- Years active: 2009–present

Lincoln Younes (born 31 January 1992) is an Australian actor. He made his debut in an episode of City Homicide in 2009, before playing Romeo Kovac in Showcase drama series Tangle until 2012. He received the ASTRA Award for Most Outstanding Performance by a Male Actor for the role. From 2011 until 2014, Younes portrayed Casey Braxton in the Australian soap opera Home and Away. After leaving the serial, he went on to appear in two seasons of Love Child as Chris Vesty, as well as the miniseries Hiding. In 2019, Younes played main character Danny Garibaldi in American series Grand Hotel, which was cancelled after one season. He then joined the supporting cast of Doctor Doctor for its fifth and final season in 2021. The following year, Younes starred in After the Verdict, and began portraying John Ibrahim in the Paramount+ miniseries Last King of the Cross.

== Early life ==
Lincoln Younes was born in Sydney, but grew up in Bendigo, Victoria, where he was raised by his mother. He has a younger brother named Jordan Younes. Younes confirmed that his surname is Arabic and he is half Lebanese. He attended Flora Hill Secondary College. After playing soccer for 14 years, Younes initially chose to pursue a sporting career. However, he later realised he preferred acting when he starred in a school production of Peter Pan. He was accepted onto a one-year weekend course at the National Institute of Dramatic Art (NIDA), and he also started a Bachelor of Arts at Melbourne University, but he decided to defer after six months.

== Career ==
In 2009, Younes made his debut in acting when he guest starred in an episode of the crime drama City Homicide as Tyler Drew. After attending his first audition, Younes was cast as Romeo Kovac in the Showcase drama series Tangle. Younes commented that the show was "the best training ground I could have had and I am really appreciative of the chance to do it." In 2013, Younes won the ASTRA Award for Most Outstanding Performance by a Male Actor for his portrayal of Romeo. Younes also appears in the feature film The Wedding Party, along with Josh Lawson and Isabel Lucas. The film was shown at the Melbourne International Film Festival.

In 2011, Younes successfully auditioned for the role of Casey Braxton in the soap opera Home and Away. He relocated to Sydney for filming. Of his character, Younes said "Casey's come from the wrong side of the tracks. He's come to a new place and is trying establish himself on the straight and narrow, while his brothers are doing anything but that." Younes was nominated for Cleo's "Bachelor of the Year" in 2013. The following year, he won the Inside Soap Award for Best Daytime Star for his portrayal of Casey. Younes decided to leave Home and Away in 2014 and he filmed his final scenes that May. Younes collaborated with the serial's writing team on his character's exit, which saw him killed-off after being shot.

Following his departure from Home and Away, Younes joined the cast of the Nine Network's drama Love Child as Chris Vesty. After flying to Los Angeles for acting work, Younes returned two days later to join the cast of ABC miniseries Hiding. The series centres on a family forced to enter into a witness protection program. Younes plays teenager Mitchell and he had to dye his hair with peroxide for the part. He described his character: "Mitchell is basically a stereotypical 17-year-old. He’s got his priorities set: his girlfriend, surfing, not much school, just living that beach life. Then all of a sudden the rug gets pulled out from under him."

Younes appears in the 2016 black-comedy film Down Under. He played Jewish male model, Lucacz, in the play The Homosexuals, Or 'Faggots' written by Declan Greene. In 2018, Younes appeared in the SBS crime drama Dead Lucky, alongside Rachel Griffiths. Younes plays Danny Garibaldi, one of the main characters, in the ABC drama Grand Hotel, which is produced by Eva Longoria and based on a Spanish format. The series centres on a family and the staff who own and run a Miami Beach hotel. The series was cancelled after one season.

In February 2020, Younes was cast in The CW's The Lost Boys pilot as Benjamin, the leader of a gang of vampires. The role is similar to the character of David, played by Kiefer Sutherland in the 1987 film. The pilot ceased, due to COVID-19. Younes was an ambassador for the 2020 MEN-tality project for Beyond Blue, shot by Peter Brew-Bevan alongside Rodger Corser, Cody Simpson and Barry Otto. He also joined the supporting cast of Nine Network drama series Doctor Doctor for its fifth season in 2021.

Younes has a supporting role in the 2022 surfing drama series Barons, which was filmed in New South Wales. He also appears in Nine Network's drama After the Verdict, alongside Sullivan Stapleton and Magda Szubanski. Younes stars as John Ibrahim in the biographical series Last King of the Cross for Paramount+. The ten-episode series, based on Ibrahim's autobiography, was filmed and produced in Sydney. For his work on Barons, After the Verdict, and Last King of the Cross, Younes received a nomination for the Logie Award for Most Popular Actor in 2023. In September, he starred in the six-part Stan Original comedy series C*A*U*G*H*T, which earned him a nomination for the Best Lead Actor in a Comedy Logie Award. He also appeared in the Foxtel comedy-drama Strife. Younes began filming the second season of Last King of the Cross in Sydney in January 2024. He was also confirmed to appear in the second season of Strife, which began production in August 2024.

On 17 July 2026, Younes was announced for the third series of Scrublands.

== Personal life ==
Younes was in a relationship with Australian actress Amy Ruffle from 2011 until 2016.

In 2021, Younes founded The 10 Challenge, a charity initiative dedicated to raising $10,000 for mental health awareness and suicide prevention by running 10 kilometres every day for the month of October.

== Filmography ==
=== Television appearances ===
Television performances
Year	Title	Role	Notes
2009	City Homicide	Tyler Drew	Episode: "The First Stone"
2009–2012	Tangle	Romeo Kovac	Main cast
2011–2014	Home and Away	Casey Braxton	Main cast
2015–2016	Love Child	Chris Vesty	Recurring role
2015	Hiding	Mitchell Quig/Mitchell Swift	Main cast
2018	Dead Lucky	Lincoln Tassoni	Miniseries
2019	Grand Hotel	Danny Garibaldi	Main cast
2021	Doctor Doctor	Tom	Recurring role
2022	Barons	Buddy Fraser	Recurring role
2022	After the Verdict	Ollie	Miniseries
2023–present	Last King of the Cross	John Ibrahim	Main cast
2023	C*A*U*G*H*T	Albhanis Mouawad	Main cast
2023–25	Strife	Giles	Recurring
TBA	Scrublands	Tom Molloy	TV series

Film performances
Year	Title	Role	Notes
2009	Locker	Tim Kelly	Short
2010	The Wedding Party	Todd	
2016	Down Under	Hassim	
2016	Petunia	Jack	Short
2018	Love and Other Places	Sam	Short
2019	Little Monsters	Private Bunton	
2021	A Spy Movie	Jeff (CIA Man)	

=== Theatre ===
Year	Title	Role	Notes
2017	The Homosexuals, or 'Faggots'	Lucacz	
2017	A View from the Bridge	Rodolpho	

== Awards and nominations ==
Year	Association	Category	Work / nominee	Result	Ref
2013	ASTRA Awards	Most Outstanding Performance by a Male Actor	Tangle	Won	
2013	Cleo	Bachelor of the Year	Lincoln Younes	Nominated	
2014	Inside Soap Awards	Best Daytime Star	Home and Away	Won	
2023	Logie Awards	Most Popular Actor	Barons, After the Verdict, Last King of the Cross	Nominated	
2024	Logie Awards	Best Lead Actor in a Comedy	C*A*U*G*H*T	Nominated	
