= Recruits: Paramedics =

- Genre: Factual
- Narrated by: Rodger Corser and Andrew Günsberg
- Opening theme: Addicted by Bliss n Eso
- Ending theme: Addicted by Bliss n Eso
- Country of origin: Australia
- Original language: English
- No. of seasons: 1
- No. of episodes: 13

Production
- Production location: Sydney
- Running time: 30 minutes (including commercials)

Original release
- Network: Network Ten
- Release: 6 October – 22 December 2011

Recruits: Paramedics is an Australian factual television program that premiered on Network Ten on 6 October 2011. It follows the work lives of new recruit paramedics in Australia, showing some of the content of their 8-week preliminary theory course, as well as clips from their first shifts on the front line. To date, 13 episodes have aired. Recruits Paramedics follows the journey of everyday people setting out to achieve a lifelong ambition to become a paramedic. Offering unique insights into the high pressure world of paramedics, we are taken into the everyday lives of new recruits as they transform their overpowering motivation to save lives into reality.

== Featured recruits ==
- Rebecca Begnell - 35 year old, former care sales supervisor
- Carleigh Dunn - 21 year old, former office worker
- Blake Field - 21 year old, former lifeguard
- Jenna Howell - 24 year old, former vet assistant
- Reynir Potter - 25 year old, former part-time firefighter
- Danielle Stroinec - 27 year old, former bookseller (retail)
- Evan Terry - former IT programmer
- Dan Versluis - former nurse
- John Williams - 24 year old, former gym attendant and fire fighter

== DVD release ==
All 13 Episodes are available on DVD. The DVD was released on 1 November 2012

JBHIFI Stockist

== Episodes ==
| Episode | Details | Extended Details | |
|---|---|---|---|
| Episode 1 | Jenna and mentor Cleone are called to assist an elderly man in cardiac arrest; John and mentor Jordan assist a 26-year-old female with a severe fever; Meanwhile, at college, Reynir learns the challenges of managing cardiac arrest | | Graduation day and 50 trainee paramedics celebrate making it through eight tough weeks of theory assessment at College. They've earned the right to hit the road. 24-year-old Jenna gave up her job as a vet's assistant to become a paramedic. An hour into her first shift, Jenna and mentor Cleone rush to the aid of an elderly man in cardiac arrest. At college she practised CPR on dummies ... but now for the first time a human life rests in her hands. Starting his new career is former tyre fitter, John Williams. Under the mentorship of Jordan, John heads out on his first emergency call – a 26-year-old girl is critically ill with fever. As one group of trainees hit the road, the next class of students start their journey at college. Former fiery, Reynir, has been waiting seven years for this moment. And from day one the pressure is on. Educators stage a fake heart attack in the classroom to test the student's reaction time. When only 2 out of 50 trainees go to the aid of the victim, the immensity of the challenge ahead becomes apparent. |
| Episode 2 | Dan attends his first hit and run incident; John experiences his first dealings with a man suffering from psychosis; Jenna attends a call after a man has a severe laceration from being hit with a broken bottle who doesn't want to seek medical attention; Meanwhile, at college, Blake learns how easily one mistake can change the outcome for a patient. | A week out of college and the trainee paramedics work their first night shifts in the city. For country boy Dan it's a baptism of fire. On a rainy night, on one of Sydney's busiest roads, he'll attend his first hit and run. Several blocks away, John and mentor Jordan face a confronting scene. A man experiencing a psychotic attack believes he has swallowed a snake. Jenna and Cleone arrive at a street party turned alcohol fuelled brawl, a reveller's been glassed in the face. But there's a hitch, he's refusing to leave the party. At college the trainees break open the equipment bags. As a former Coff's lifesaver, Blake Field knows about first aid. But taking correct pulse, handling stethoscopes and applying neck braces is a very different game. As Blake discovers, one tiny mistake can result in dire consequences for his patient. | |
| Episode 3 | John responds to his first car accident, after a 67-year-old became drowsy and crashed into a power pole; Jenna is confronted with the reality of death, after a woman is found deceased in her home after not being seen for 12 days; Meanwhile, students at college receive their uniforms and learn the best techniques when managing a stretcher | In Sydney's city, John has been working his dream job for just two weeks and already he's experienced plenty. Tonight another. First, 67-year-old Dermott became drowsy at the wheel and has collided with a power pole. Mentor Jordan has witnessed hundreds of car crashes in his career, but at his first, trainee John has little idea what to expect. Out in suburbia Jenna and Cleone make a grim discovery. A man hasn't seen his neighbour for 12 days and as the team arrive, their worst fears are confirmed. For the students at college one of the most anticipated days of the entire course has arrived - their uniforms. But the euphoria doesn't last long, today's lesson, stretcher technique, the students discover, it's harder than it looks. | |
| Episode 4 | John has his first experience as primary treating officer, after a lady is affected by OC spray following a brawl; Carleigh attends a call to a woman who is unconscious and bleeding in a local park, with no knowledge of the preceding events; Rebecca needs to practice her tension diffusing skills when confronted with an aggressive patient; John is called out to a suicide attempt | Jordan believes John's now ready to step up and take the role of primary treating officer. OC spray has been used by police to break up a brawl outside a nightclub but an innocent bystander has been hit by the spray. She is in agony but John can only wash the pain away if he can get her to open her eyes. Out on the road trainee paramedic Carleigh Dunn is following her life plan. She's graduated top of the class from college but tonight it's detective work that's needed to solve the mystery of a woman found bleeding and unconscious in a local park. As part of her training Rebecca was taught that defusing tension is a crucial skill. She's already had one bad experience with an aggressive patient, and now she's in the midst of her second. | |
| Episode 5 | Jenna is called out to assist a first-time mother who as gone into labour; John is called out to a high alert overdose; Carleigh faces an urgent situation after a man with a known heart condition collapses and begins vomiting and sweating.; Meanwhile, college students learn how to assist patients who are pregnant or in labour | For the students at college it's one of the most important sessions of the entire course, pregnancy and delivery. 21-year-old Blake soon discovers childbirth is well out of his comfort zone. No matter how confronting, chances are each of these trainees will deliver a baby sometime during their careers. And for Jenna out on the road, that moment may well have arrived. She's called out to a suburban home, a first time mum has gone into labour. A high alert drug overdose propels John and Jordan into King Cross. It's a brutal lesson in the unpredictable effects of illicit drugs. Carleigh faces a life and death situation. A man has collapsed during the family's Sunday dinner. With a history of heart problems, and now vomiting and sweating, he could be in serious trouble. | |
| Episode 6 | Evan begins his first shift and is called out to a car accident, where a car has crashed into an electricity pole; Jenna is called out to assist after a man suffers from an epileptic seizure and is unconscious; Reynir, on his first observation shift, is called out to an attempted suicide | City boy Evan starts his first shift in Richmond on the rural fringes of Sydney. He's worked in IT for the last 8 years but it's out on the road that he's finding job satisfaction. On a nearby highway, a car is wrapped around an electricity pole. The driver, Guy, is stable but extracting him from the wreck brings its own risks. It's almost midnight when Jenna & Cleone are called to a suspected epileptic seizure. As the patient swings in and out of consciousness it proves a tricky case to solve. After mid-term exams the students are about to get their first taste as front line paramedics. They're about to spend 3 days observing on the road. The first job Reynir will attend as a student paramedic is one that even seasoned paramedics find confronting. A young man has tried to hang himself. | |
| Episode 7 | Evan is called out to his first car accident; Rebecca is called out to assist with injuries resulting from a brawl in Kings Cross; John is called out to assist at an old-age home after a resident falls; Meanwhile, at college, the recruits learn the most effective way of assisting drivers who are involved in car accidents | A large number of ambulance call outs are to motor vehicle accidents. So for a trainee paramedic, learning how to extract an injured passenger out of a wreck is critical. In Richmond, former IT programmer Evan heads towards his first car crash. 65 km down the road in Sydney's Kings Cross jungle the results of a drunken brawl put Rebecca, a mother of three, to the test. It's the first time she's been to the red light district and already she has blood on her hands - literally. However, for rookie John his day is an eye opener for different reasons. The frailty and loneliness of old age hits home as he sees a side of life he's never experienced before. At Paramedic College Danielle and Reynir are feeling the pressure of their new career. They're learning how to get injured drivers out of car wrecks. Get it wrong and their patient could end up a paraplegic. | |
| Episode 8 | Evan is called to a doctors office after a man collapses from cardiac arrest; Jenna is called to a party, where a brawl has left a man with severe lacerations inflicted by glass bottle | A man collapses in a doctor's office from cardiac arrest. Minutes later a team of paramedics, including trainee paramedic Evan, are at the scene trying to get the man's heart to beat. If Evan is to qualify as a fully-fledged paramedic, he must perform. Out in Sydney's west, it's Christmas Eve. It's Jenna's first experience of working alongside Santa. A street party turns ugly when a man is glassed and Jenna and mentor Cleone arrive to pick up the pieces. | |
| Episode 9 | Rebecca is called to assist a young girl with breathing difficulties; Evan is called to a car accident, after a man has rolled his car several times and suffers serious injuries; Meanwhile, at college, recruits are being assessed on their CPR skills | Trainee Rebecca and her mentor Chris are closest to the scene when a call comes in to assist a 9-year-old girl with breathing difficulties. It's an emotionally charged scene as the girl's family are incredibly distraught. Bec needs to keep her cool. On Sydney's outskirts 82-year-old Bob has rolled his car several times. It's up to Evan, in the role of treating paramedic for the first time, to treat his serious injuries. It is a big responsibility and puts the young rookie to the test. And unusual scene John Williams the trainee, meets John Williams the patient. Will the real John Williams please stand up? At Paramedic College trainees are nearing the end of their 8 weeks intensive theory and it's crunch time. Blake and Reynir must show their CPR skills in a simulated cardiac arrest scenario. The patient has stopped breathing. They'll need to show instructors they're ready to deal with real life heart attacks out on the road. | |
| Episode 10 | Jenna responds to her first pedestrian collision; Rebecca is called to assist with a 67-year-old cancer patient in severe pain; Meanwhile, at college, recruits are preparing for their final assessments, including treating a simulated trauma patient | At Paramedic College a class of new recruits are nearing their final assessments but before they can begin their on-road training there's one more hurdle to jump. The tough 'major trauma' assessment. They'll be treating a simulated patient. If Reynir and Blake fail this test, they could be out of a job. Jenna's been out of college for eight weeks with mentor Cleone. Today she is called to her first pedestrian collision. A car has struck a teenage-boy and, with pedestrian deaths accounting for about 13% of all road fatalities, Jenna's patient is lucky to be alive - although it is the injuries Jenna can not see that have her worried. Compassion is perhaps the biggest pre-requisite to becoming a Paramedic and after two months as a trainee, Rebecca's had plenty of time to reflect on this very human quality. When her father was dying of cancer, it was the compassion shown to him by a nurse that made Rebecca change careers and become a Paramedic. Now the mother of three is called to a job close to her heart when a 67-year-old cancer patient is in great pain. | |
| Episode 11 | At college, Blake is preparing for his final assessments; Reynir starts his first shift, and is called out to a drug overdose, where the patient is unpredictable and potentially violent | Trainee Paramedics must pass eight weeks of intensive theory before they're allowed to start a 3-year mentorship on the road. For Blake, passing his final assessment is the only thing that stands between him and his dream job... But a crucial error threatens to derail the promise of a new career. Having passed his final test Reynir finds himself on the road with six-year paramedic, Mel. It is a Saturday night, the full moon is out and a drug overdose is Reynir's first official job as a paramedic. It is an unpredictable and potentially explosive situation for the fresh-faced recruit. For rookie paramedics, dealing with situations on the street is very different from the classroom environment. Despite the best training possible, nothing can prepare them for the unforeseeable circumstances that confront them on a daily basis. As for young Blake, he manages to scrape through his final test at College but his real test now awaits him. Life on the road as a paramedic. | |
| Episode 12 | Blake begins his first shift after college and is called out to a lady who is believed to be suffering from swine flu; Rebecca is called out to assist a young woman who has collapsed on the road, and has possibly had her drink spiked; John is called out to assist with a five-car pile-up | It's a day of firsts for Blake who has just left Paramedic College and is now stationed in Coffs Harbour, NSW. His shift begins when a 13-year-old girl, worried about her mum, rings triple zero for an ambulance. The patient is suffering from severe respiratory distress complicated with a rare case of Swine Flu. It is a precarious situation and one that puts young Blake to the test. Saturday nights in Sydney are never quiet for a Paramedic. Trainee Rebecca and her mentor Chris are called to the aid of a young girl who is left collapsed and vulnerable on the side of a busy road. Her story rings alarm bells of a spiked drink. As more and more people drive into the city to paint the town red, probationer John is called to a five-car pile up on a major highway. His thoughts drift back to his first motor vehicle accident when he wasn't so sure on his feet. | |
| Episode 13 | Reynir is called to a situation at a train station, after a man collapses in cardiac arrest; Jenna, Evan, Rebecca and John have completed their first 3 months on-road training and say goodbye to their first mentors | Reynir has just finished eight weeks at Paramedic College and has just begun three years of on road training. It's his 2nd day with new mentor, veteran paramedic Mel and within minutes of starting his shift, Reynir is thrown into the deepest end possible. In Sydney's Central Railway station a businessman is about to make a huge impact on the young trainee. As the man walks to a train, security cameras capture him collapsing to the ground—he has had a heart attack. Minutes later a team of paramedics, including Reynir, rush to treat the man. It is Reynir's first cardiac arrest and the first time he has used a defibrillator in a real-life situation. Only 3% of people who suffer cardiac arrest outside hospital survive. If the man does pull through he will be one of the lucky few. At the end of 3 months on-road training, it's time for Jenna, Evan, Rebecca and John to say goodbye to their first. | |
