= Spirited =

Australian television drama series

- Genre: Comedy drama Supernatural
- Created by: Jacquelin Perske; Claudia Karvan
- Starring: Claudia Karvan; Matt King; Rodger Corser; Belinda Bromilow; Angus Sampson; Louis Fowler; Charlie Hancock
- Theme music composer: Jed Kurzel
- Opening theme: Stranded by The Saints
- Country of origin: Australia
- Original language: English
- No. of seasons: 2
- No. of episodes: 18 (list of episodes)

Production
- Executive producers: Claudia Karvan; Jacquelin Perske
- Producer: John Edwards
- Running time: 60 minutes
- Production companies: Northside Productions; Southern Star Entertainment

Original release
- Network: W
- Release: 25 August 2010 – 21 September 2011

Spirited is an Australian television supernatural comedy-drama series made for subscription television channel W that aired for two seasons, 2010 and 2011.

The series stars Claudia Karvan as dentist Suzy Darling, who walks away from a loveless marriage and into an old apartment block that is inhabited by the ghost of a 1980s English rock star, Henry Mallet, played by Matt King. Suzy had been married to Steve Darling, played by Rodger Corser, for 15 years, and they have two children, Elvis, 13, played by Louis Fowler, and Verity, 8, played by Charlie Hancock. Belinda Bromilow plays Suzy's sister Jonquil.

== Cast ==
=== Main cast ===
- Claudia Karvan as Suzy Darling
- Matt King as Henry Mallet
- Rodger Corser as Steve Darling
- Belinda Bromilow as Jonquil Payne
- Louis Fowler as Elvis Darling
- Charlie Hancock as Verity Darling
- Angus Sampson as Zach Hannigan
- Jane Harders as Rita
- Yael Stone as Linda

=== Recurring ===
- Anna McGahan as Penelope (5 episodes)
- Damon Gameau as Adrian Brixton (2 episodes)
- Gillian Jones as Fran Jensen (1 episode)
- Heather Mitchell as Helen Payne (8 episodes)
- Jacek Koman as Potter the Man (4 episodes)
- John Bluthal as Rocco (6 episodes)
- Paul Gleeson as Terry (14 episodes)
- Russell Dykstra as Adam One (8 episodes)
- Sarah Snook as Antonia (10 episodes)
- Simon Lyndon as 'The King' / Darren Bonney (10 episodes)
- Tasneem Roc as Miss Viola Take (4 episodes)

=== Guests ===
- Dan Ewing as Jason Stone (1 episode)
- Doc Neeson as Billy Brixton (1 episode)
- Jennifer Byrne as TV Bookshow Host (1 episode)
- John Gregg as Priest (1 episode)
- Pacharo Mzembe as Ghost Tang (1 episode)
- Russell Kiefel as Engineer (1 episode)
- Sarah Peirse aa Charlotte (1 episode)
- Toby Schmitz as Scott (1 episode)
- Wendy Playfair as Geisella McKenzie (1 episode)

== Series ==
Claudia Karvan stars as dentist Suzy Darling, who walks away from her husband Steve Darling (Rodger Corser) of 15 years and their loveless marriage and into an old apartment block that is inhabited by the ghost of Henry Mallet (Matt King), a 1980s English rock star. Suzy also has two children, thirteen-year-old son Elvis (Louis Fowler) and eight-year-old daughter Verity (Charlie Hancock), along with a sister Jonquil (Belinda Bromilow).

It is revealed that although Suzy is the only living human being able to see Henry, animals, such as the resident cat, can sense his presence. However, in one scene Henry frightens the caretaker into a heart attack by blowing into his ear.

Spirited is produced by John Edwards, Claudia Karvan and Jacquelin Perske who also created drama series Love My Way.

== Episodes ==
=== Series overview ===
Season	Episodes	Originally released	
Season	Episodes	First released	Last released
1	8	August 25, 2010	October 13, 2010
2	10	July 20, 2011	September 21, 2011

=== Series 1 (2010) ===
No. overall	No. in series	Title	Directed by	Written by	Original release date
1	1	"The Man Who Fell to Earth"	Jessica Hobbs	Jacquelin Perske	25 August 2010
Uptight dentist Suzy Darling leaves her egotistical husband Steve and moves her children, Elvis and Verity, into a beautiful penthouse apartment to start a new life. She soon finds that the home is already occupied – by Henry, a strangely attired British man who has lost his memory. To make matters more mysterious, it soon becomes apparent that no one but Suzy can see him.
2	2	"Everybody Loves You When You're Dead"	Jessica Hobbs	Ian Meadows	1 September 2010
Suzy and Henry are still coming to terms with their new "living arrangements" when they learn that Henry was front man for legendary British punk rock band The Nerve. Desperate to learn who he was, how he died and just why he is here, Henry annoys Suzy at every chance and is soon wreaking havoc in her life. Meanwhile, ex-husband Steve concocts a plan to win Suzy back while therapist sister Jonquil has an agenda all of her own.
3	3	"Wild Horses"	Johnathan Teplitzky	Tony McNamara	8 September 2010
Henry awakes on the rooftop of The Elysian apartment block, memories of past glories starting to flood back in his dreams. Feeling more alive than ever, he sees the opportunity to be reborn via the magic of the internet and with Suzy's help contacts his loyal followers through a fan website. Steve launches a plan to get back at Suzy for leaving him by buying Verity a miniature pony to reside in the penthouse, but his plan backfires when Suzy appears to embrace it. Henry is disgusted by Suzy's passive-aggressive tactics and tries to persuade her to get a bit of punk into her life. He is rather surprised to find what a punk she really is at heart.
4	4	"I Remember Nothing"	Johnathan Teplitzky	Ian Meadows	15 September 2010
Henry's existential angst continues to roar through his dreams and he wakes to find a shrine of sorts out the front of The Elysian. The call he sent out through the internet has been answered. Henry tries to convince a sceptical Suzy these fans should be encouraged when he catches sight of a bearded man in Suzy's dental surgery who drops lines that sound awfully familiar. This is none other than Zac Hannigan, tax lawyer and part-time rock journalist, bonafide chronicler of Henry's life. Suzy is surprised when Henry does not want him around. It seems Henry's memory is returning only for him to find there are things he'd rather forget.
5	5	"Wake Up Little Suzy"	Daniel Nettheim	Jessica Redenbach	22 September 2010
When Henry and Suzy meet in a dream in Manchester, 1982, new possibilities for their relationship unleash a previously unspoken sexual tension that is played out through a series of dreams and unexpected encounters. Nerve nerd Zac Hannigan continues his investigations into Henry's disappearance, focusing on the paternity of Suzy's son in the mistaken belief that Henry might be his father. Zac has an awkward encounter with Jonquil, who is pursuing her own dream – to become the next Mrs Darling, unaware that Suzy's ex-husband Steve is continuing his successful wooing of daughter Verity's primary school teacher, Viola Take, with surprising results.
6	6	"Cat's in the Cradle"	Daniel Nettheim	Marieke Hardy and Jacquelin Perske	29 September 2010
Suzy and Henry's new found intimacy is making Suzy nervous. But thankfully for Suzy, a major distraction comes looming when an odd, officious little man turns up and starts poking around the apartments asking questions about ex-residents. His name is Adrian, and when Suzy handballs him to Rocco he takes it upon himself to delve rather deeply into the history of the building and its former tenants.
7	7	"Riders on the Storm"	Jessica Hobbs	Jacquelin Perske	6 October 2010
Suzy faces the unpalatable reality of life with a ghostly stepson, Apollo, who has transformed into a filthy mouthed, badly behaved, overgrown baby, quickly making The Elysian uninhabitable for the residents. But it's when he lures Elvis and Verity into the ghostly realm and great danger that Suzy and Henry are forced to find a way to make him leave. They work together to find a solution while also battling their own demons.Meanwhile Suzy has to contend with a love-struck Jonquil, full to the brim with the first flush of her romance with Zac, and the jealousy of Steve, who learns from their kids of the existence of a mysterious man in Suzy's life called Henry. All comes together in a hilarious, terrifying and surreal climax, involving a power outage, Apollo's banishing, the return of Charlotte, Henry's long-lost first love, and Steve's accidental electrocution.
8	8	"If You Leave Me Can I Come Too?"	Jessica Hobbs	Jacquelin Perske and Jessica Redenbach	13 October 2010
With Apollo vanquished, life returns to something like normal at the Darling-Mallet household, Henry accustomed to his role as invisible family member, while Suzy suffers strange symptoms of a mystery illness. When a patient dies in her dental chair and a yellow cab to The Other Side arrives out the front of The Elysian, Suzy is convinced it's proof of her imminent death. But Henry knows: the cab is for him, the time is coming for him to move on and say goodbye to the uptight dentist. Will he stay or will he go? That's the dilemma that Henry faces, and Suzy's sickness might just be a little bit more related to this than she would like to admit.

=== Series 2 (2011) ===
No. overall	No. in series	Title	Directed by	Written by	Original release date
9	1	"Changes"	Stuart McDonald	Jacquelin Perske	20 July 2011
Henry Mallet returns to the Elysian with a group of new ghosts whose fun and games create trouble for Suzy's personal and professional life.
10	2	"Time After Time"	Stuart McDonald	Jacquelin Perske	27 July 2011
Henry's attempts at trying to remedy the ghost situation hits a snag and Potter the cat goes to some extraordinary lengths to help him put things right.
11	3	"Alone with You"	Michael James Rowland	Tony McNamara	3 August 2011
Suzy finds herself the object of a new, powerful and charismatic ghost's attention but his designs on her prove more sinister than sexy when his shocking past is exposed.
12	4	"Blood Sugar Sex Magik"	Michael James Rowland	Jacquelin Perske & Lally Katz	10 August 2011
Henry accidentally possesses Zac and rediscovers the sensuous joys of a living, breathing body, including cheese, smoking, beer and, hopefully, sex.
13	5	"Sweet Child O'Mine"	Jonathan Teplitzky	Tony McNamara	17 August 2011
Suzy and Henry try internet dating to find a suitable candidate for Henry to possess. Meanwhile, Jonquil must cope with the return of her adored, long lost mother.
14	6	"If You See Her, Say Hello"	Jonathan Teplitzky	Alice Bell	24 August 2011
Henry is unconcerned that ghosts are disappearing but that is until they realise Rita's pretty new friend is getting a thrill from 'liberating' spirits.
15	7	"Dancing in the Dark"	Jonathan Brough	Jessica Redenbach	31 August 2011
Suzy discovers she has more in common with her long lost mother than she could have imagined, which leads to an astonishing revelation for Suzy and Henry.
16	8	"The Real Thing"	Jonathan Brough	Tommy Murphy	7 September 2011
An elderly, flesh and blood Henry Mallet turns up on Zac's doorstep, claiming he never died.
17	9	"Yesterday's Hero"	Rowan Woods	Ian Meadows	14 September 2011
When Zac gets busy consulting on the biopic of Henry's life, Jonquil is inspired to host a 'healing ceremony' for the King's victims, but it comes with unexpected results.
18	10	"I'll Close My Eyes"	Rowan Woods	Jacquelin Perske	21 September 2011
Henry's world crumbles when he and Suzy learn The Elysian must be demolished. The two are forced to extreme lengths to save Henry from going down with it.

== Cancellation ==
On 15 October 2011, W announced that it had canceled Spirited and that there would be no third series. Immediately following this announcement, fans launched a campaign to have the show renewed, using the slogan "SOS: Save Our Spirited". It was announced on 16 December that a possible development deal had been reached with another Australian premium cable channel, Showcase, for a third series. However, with Claudia Karvan being cast in a Puberty Blues reboot, the likelihood of a third series was slim. Spirited was not picked up for a third season.

== Reception ==
Jo Curtis at UnrealityTV.com found the pilot "funny; it’s very funny, but probably only if you have a sense of humour that tends towards black", and described the comedy and Karvan's character transformation as "a breath of fresh air."

The first season was "Foxtel's most successful Australian drama." Although the target audience was "women in their 40s", it also gained the interest of male teenagers, for the "punk character" of Henry Mallet, according to Karvan.

In a video review, Doug Anderson (The Age/The Guide) and Lenny Ann Low (SMH) described the series as "very engaging", and "quality drama" with no problems in its style, substance or ideas.

The Age reviewer Brad Newsome described the second-season premiere as "just as imaginative and funny as any that has gone before." In the week following, Newsome described the show as "one of the most imaginative things on TV, blending romance, drama and comedy into a wonderfully satisfying whole."

=== Awards and nominations ===
The seventh episode in the first series, "Riders on the Storm", written by Jacquelin Perske (writer of the film Little Fish), was one of three nominees for the 2011 Australian Writers Guild AWGIE Award for best scriptwriting in a television series.

Season 2 of Spirited was nominated for 'Best Television Drama Series' at the 2012 AACTA (Australian Academy of Cinema and Television Arts) awards.

== Home video releases ==
DVD Season	# Episodes	# Disc(s)	Region 1	Region 2	Region 4	Special Features
Season 1	8	2	—N/a	—N/a	19 April 2011	None
Season 2	10	3	—N/a	—N/a	8 February 2012	None
Season 1 & 2	18	5	—N/a	—N/a	2 May 2012	None
