= Recruits (TV series) =

Australian television series

- Genre: Factual
- Narrated by: Rodger Corser and Andrew Günsberg
- Country of origin: Australia
- Original language: English
- No. of seasons: 2
- No. of episodes: 25

Production
- Production location: Sydney
- Running time: 30 minutes (including commercials)

Original release
- Network: Network Ten; One HD
- Release: 4 May 2009 – 21 October 2010

Recruits is an Australian factual television program that premiered on Channel Ten on 4 May 2009. A second season began on 29 July 2010.

== Overview ==
Recruits follows the day-to-day life of a group of police recruits on their way to becoming police officers in the New South Wales Police Force. It follows two groups of Policing recruits and Probationary Constables from the New South Wales Police College at Goulburn, showing how they use their training and skills as probationary constables in the state.

== DVD releases ==
As of April 2015 series 1 and 2 DVD have been discontinued, series 1 can be found on DVD sites like eBay. But series 2 is rare to get on DVD now.

| Season | Date Released | # Of Episodes | # Of Discs | Special Features |
|---|---|---|---|---|
| Season 1 | 4 November 2009 | 13 | 2 | None |
| Season 2 | 10 January 2011 | 12 | 2 | None |
