= Peter Salmon (filmmaker) =

New Zealand filmmaker

Peter Salmon is a New Zealand film and television screenwriter and director. He has directed many TV series in both New Zealand and Australia, as well as several short films. In 2023 he directed the New Zealand drama series After the Party.

== Career ==
Salmon's first 35 mm short film "Playing Possum" was made in association with Creative New Zealand in 1998. It screened in competition at Clermont Ferrand, Edinburgh Film Festival and Valladolid International Film Festival. It also screened at Telluride Film Festival, Rotterdam, New York Children's Festival, Mill Valley, Hof, Brisbane, and L'Étrange Festival, where it won the Grand Prix and audience awards, among others.

His next short film was science fiction drama "Letters about the Weather", starring Sara Wiseman (winner of best performance in a short film (NZ film awards 2000)). The film was made with funding from the New Zealand Film Commission in 1999. It screened in competition in Clermont-Ferrand, where it received an Ecumenical Jury Special Mention and Puchon Fantastic in Korea. It also screened in Telluride Film Festival, Cannes Forum and San Tropez.

His short film "Fog" was made in 2007 with Maxim Films and the New Zealand Film Commission on location in Ngawi, New Zealand. It stars Chelsie Preston Crayford (winner of best performance in a short film (NZ film awards 2007)). "Fog" premiered in Cannes Critics Week in 2007, later screening in Melbourne, New Zealand, and Stockholm.

Salmon's short film "The Box", set in New York City, premiered at the New Zealand Film Festival in 2010.

Alongside his film projects Salmon is a director and writer of television programmes, notably the internationally successful South Pacific Pictures teen drama series Being Eve. The show was a finalist in the International Emmy Awards 2002 (Children & Young People), Gold World Medal Winner (Teen Programmes) in the New York Festivals 2002, and received the 2002 TV Guide New Zealand Television Awards for Best Drama Series, Best Contribution Soundtrack and Best Contribution Design. Salmon has also directed five episodes for South Pacific Pictures drama series, Go Girls.

Salmon also directed the motion capture elements for Weta Workshop and Nelvana's successful animation series Jane and the Dragon. He went on to direct the multi award-winning show Outrageous Fortune, and wrote for the popular pre school animation series, "The WotWots".

Salmon directed three episodes for "Power Rangers RPM", and went on to direct "This is not my Life", a science fiction drama for TVNZ. He also directed episodes of "Power Rangers Samurai" and "Power Rangers Dino Charge".

In 2023 he directed the drama series After the Party, co-created by and starring Robyn Malcolm.

== Personal life ==
As of 2014 Salmon was married to actress Morgana O'Reilly. They have a daughter, born in 2015.

== Filmography ==
Director / Writer - Film

- The Box (2010): Director/Co-Writer
- Fog (2007): Director
- Letters About The Weather (1999): Director/Co-Writer
- Playing Possum (1998): Director/Writer
- The Creakers (1997): Director/Writer

Director / Writer - Television

- Halifax: Retribution (2020): Director
- Harrow (2018): Director
- Wanted (2017–2018): Director
- Doctor Doctor (2016): Director
- Rake (2016): Director
- The Beautiful Lie (2015): Director
- Power Rangers: Dino Charge (2015): Director
- Nowhere Boys (2014): Director
- Mr & Mrs Murder (2013): Director
- Agent Anna (2013): Director
- Nothing Trivial (2012): Director
- Power Rangers: Samurai (2011-2012): Director
- This is not my Life (2009): Director
- Power Rangers: RPM (2009): Director
- The WotWots (2009): Writer
- Go Girls (2008): Director
- Outrageous Fortune (Series 4) (2008): Director
- My Story (2007): Director/Co-Writer
- Jane and the Dragon (2005): Motion Capture Director
- Being Eve (2001): Director/Writer
