= TV Tonight =

Australian television news website

- Company type: Private
- Website type: Entertainment and media news
- Available in: English
- Country of origin: Australia
- Creator: David Knox
- Website: tvtonight.com.au
- Advertising: Yes
- Commercial: Yes
- Registration: Optional
- Launched: 5 January 2007; 19 years ago
- Current status: Active

TV Tonight is an Australian-based website which features reviews, news and programming information related to television in Australia as well as OzTAM ratings information.

The site was started by television critic David Knox in 2007 after listeners of his radio programs asked him for information they had missed. Knox runs the site, publishing his interviews with Australian media actors, producers, directors and programmers. Knox regularly visits the sets of Australian television series and reviews television programs.

Knox also served as television critic for ABC Radio National's breakfast program from 2009 to 2015. Dan Barrett is now in this role. Knox has an advanced diploma in screenwriting and was the founding Artistic Director of Screenplay.

TV Tonight is also referenced in Australian media, including The Sydney Morning Herald and news.com.au, while Knox gives commentary for other media outlets including News Corp Australia, MediaWeek and ABC.

The website began a campaign to include more female Logie Awards Hall of Fame inductees. A year after the campaign, the event's second female inductee was admitted in Noni Hazlehurst at the 2016 ceremony.
