= Hayley McElhinney =

Australian actress (born 1974)

- Born: 12 September 1974 (age 52); Australia
- Occupation: Actress
- Years active: 1996−present
- Notable work: The Babadook (2014)
- Television: Doctor Doctor (2016−2021)

Hayley McElhinney (born 12 September 1974) is an Australian stage, film and television actress.

Graduating from the Western Australian Academy of Performing Arts in 1999, McElhinney has performed around Australia and in the United States with the Melbourne Theatre Company, Black Swan Theatre Company, Perth Theatre Company and Sydney Theatre Company. She was nominated for a Helpmann Award in 2007 and was a core member of Sydney Theatre Company's Actor's Company ensemble from 2006 – 2008. She played Sonya in the Sydney Theatre Company production of Uncle Vanya which met with excellent reviews when it played in Sydney (2010), Washington, D.C. (2011) and Manhattan (2012).

On 15 March 2024, it was announced that McElhinney joined the cast of Stan series Invisible Boys. On 8 August, she also joined the production of Proclivitas.

== Personal life ==
She is the sister of Mandy McElhinney.

== Filmography ==
Year	Title	Role	Notes
1996	Sweat	Jade	1 episode
1998	Good Guys Bad Guys	Loyola Maginnis-McLeod	1 episode
2000	Water Rats (TV series)	Sherrilyn Kelly	1 episode
2009	Sea Princesses	"Voice"	52 episodes
2013	Rizzoli & Isles	Jennifer Humphrey	1 episode
2016-21	Doctor Doctor	Penny	48 episodes
2022	Mystery Road: Origin	Max	6 episodes
2022	Upright	Linda/Willow	6 episodes
2025	Invisible Boys	Nadine Roth	TV series: 4 episodes
2025	The Twelve	Marilyn Thorne	TV series

=== Film appearances ===
Year	Title	Role	Notes
2025	Proclivitas	Officer Tara	
2022	How to Please a Woman	Hayley	
2020	Rams	May	
2019	Hearts and Bones	Josie Avril	
2014	The Babadook	Claire	
2012	Redd Inc.	Sheena O'Leary	
2000	City Loop	Katie	
1999	My Mother Frank	Francine	

== Theatre ==
In 2014, McElhinney performed in White Rabbit, Red Rabbit. In 2023, both McElhinney sisters appeared in Dirty Birds for Black Swan Theatre.

Year	Title	Role	Notes	Ref
2023	Dirty Birds		Black Swan Theatre	
2022	Oil	May	Black Swan Theatre	
2020	Heart and Bones	Josie		
2014	White Rabbit, Red Rabbit			
2010	Uncle Vanya	Sonya	Sydney Theatre Co	
