= Belinda Bromilow =

Australian actress

- Born: Perth, Western Australia
- Education: Western Australian Academy of Performing Arts
- Occupation: Actress
- Years active: 2001–present
- Spouse: Tony McNamara (m. 2009)
- Children: 2

Belinda Bromilow is an Australian actress. She is known for her roles in the Nine Network series, Doctor Doctor (2016–21), and the Hulu/Disney+ series, The Great (2020–23).

== Education ==
Bromilow studied acting at the Western Australian Academy of Performing Arts.

== Career ==
Bromilow has appeared in a number of Australian television series, including Mcleod's Daughters, Packed to the Rafters, and Rake. She played Jonquil Payne as a series regular on Spirited from 2010 to 2011. In 2016 Bromilow joined the main cast of Doctor Doctor as Betty Bell. She appeared in every episode of the series. In film, Bromilow has had roles in The Rage in Placid Lake and Not Suitable for Children.

Bromilow gained greater recognition outside of Australia through her role as Aunt Elizabeth in the Hulu/Disney+ series The Great. She unsuccessfully auditioned for a part in the 2008 Sydney Theatre Company production of the original play upon which the series is based.

== Personal life ==
She married Australian director, playwright and screenwriter, Tony McNamara, in 2009. Together they have two children. Bromilow is a stepmother to McNamara's daughter from a previous marriage. She was diagnosed with bowel cancer ten weeks after her son was born.

In 2019, Bromilow auctioned a pair of earrings she wore to the 91st Academy Awards valued at $8,950. The earrings were designed by her friend, jewellery designer, Nicole Winkler. All proceeds from the auction were donated to the Australian organisation, Mummy's Wish, helping families of women diagnosed with cancer.

== Filmography ==
Year	Title	Role	Notes
2001	All Saints	Fiona Bannock	Episode: "Behind Closed Doors"
2002	Sway	Bel	
2003	The Rage in Placid Lake	Nurse Doreen	
2003	McLeod's Daughters	Ashley Redstaff	Episode: "The Ties That Bind"
2003	MDA	Sally Delaney	Episode: "Without Prejudice"
2006	Define Success	Angela Taylor	Short Film
2006	Happy Feet	Live Action Cast	
2007	Talk To Me	Nicole	Recurring: 4 Episodes
2009–2010	Packed to the Rafters	Libby Sanders	Recurring: 7 Episodes
2010–2011	Spirited	Jonquil Payne	Main Role: 18 Episodes
2012	Not Suitable For Children	Claire	
2013	Mr & Mrs Murder	Cate McVeigh	Episode: "Early Checkout"
2013	Felony	Accident Site Cop	
2016–2021	Doctor Doctor	Betty Bell	Main Role: 48 Episodes
2018	Rake	Patrice Devine	Episode: "Gold and Greene v Red"
2020–2023	The Great	Aunt Elizabeth	Main Role: 30 Episodes
2025	The Roses	Janice the counselor	
