= Nicole da Silva =

Australian actress (born 1981)

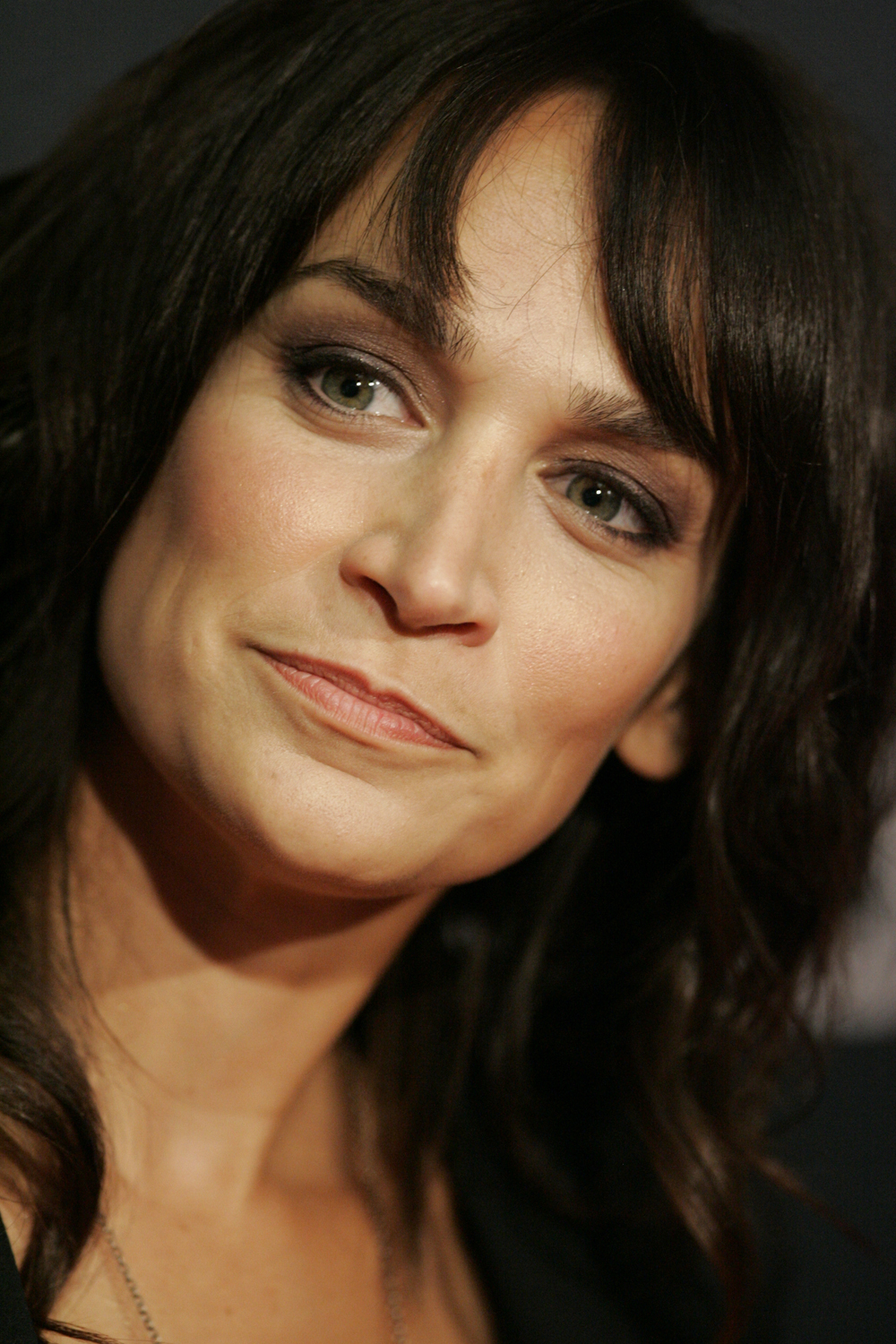
- Born: 18 September 1981 (age 45); Sydney, Australia
- Occupation: Actress
- Years active: 2005–present
- Known for: Rush (2008–2011); Wentworth (2013–2019); Doctor Doctor (2016–2021); Love Me (2023); One Night (2023); Home and Away (2026–)
- Children: 1
- Awards: ASTRA Awards for Most Outstanding Performance by an Actor (Female)

Nicole da Silva is an Australian stage, film and television actress, best known for her roles as Stella Dagostino in the series Rush (2008–2011), and as Franky Doyle in the show Wentworth (2013–2019). She has made appearances in series such as Carla Cametti PD (2009) and Doctor Doctor (2016–2021).

== Early life and education ==
Nicole da Silva was born in Sydney and is of Portuguese background.

She obtained her Bachelor of Arts at the University of Western Sydney's Theatre Nepean, now known as Western Sydney University, in 2003.

== Career ==
Da Silva's first on-screen credit came in the Seven Network medical drama show All Saints, in which she played Sasha Fernandez for 11 episodes in 2005. In 2007, she played Erica 'EC' Eulestra in the Fox8 series Dangerous, a role that earned her a Logie Award nomination.

Da Silva gained notable recognition in the Network Ten police drama series Rush, in which she appeared in all 70 episodes in four seasons as Stella Dagostino, in the story based on the real-life Victoria Police Critical Incident Response Team, with the plot exploring both the personal and working lives of the team. Da Silva broke her leg while filming a scene on the show.

She played one of the main roles as Lisa Testro in the show Carla Cametti PD (2009) for six episodes, but the series was cancelled after just one season.

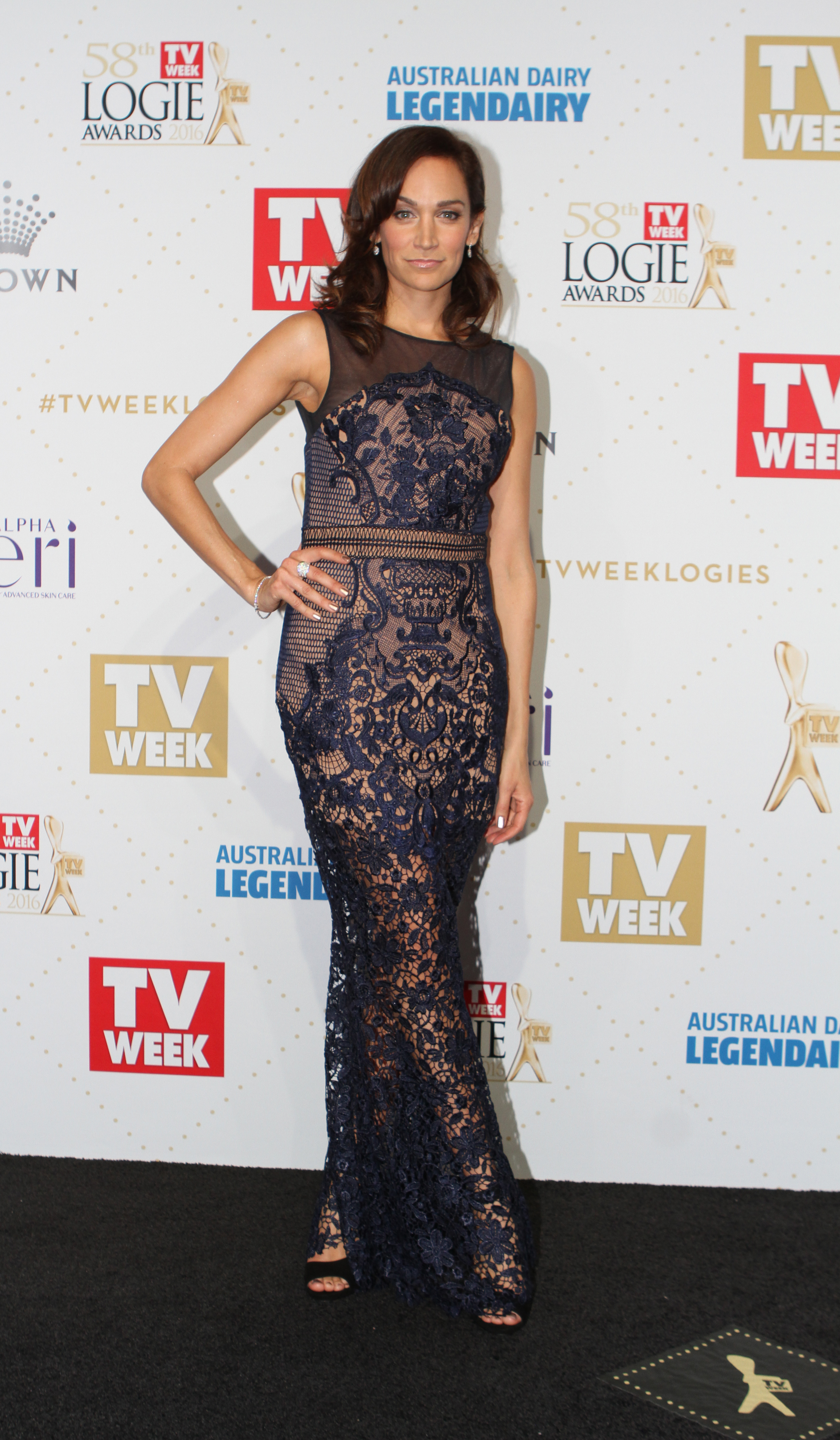
Da Silva in 2016

Da Silva is probably best known for her role in the SoHo TV drama series Wentworth, in which she appeared from 2013 to 2018 as Franky Doyle. This role earned Da Silva the ASTRA Award for the Most Outstanding Performance by an Actor (Female) in 2014, and several other nominations.

In 2015, da Silva made her big-screen debut as Nana in Sophie Mathisen's romantic comedy Drama, starring Agnès Boury, Julien Bravo, and Jonathan Burteaux. In 2016, while working on Wentworth, da Silva was cast for the role of Charlie Knight in the Nine Network medical drama show Doctor Doctor, in the story of a rising heart surgeon's life and his problems that converted him from a big-city doctor into a small-town doctor. She appeared in all five seasons of the show while also appearing in Wentworth.

In 2023, da Silva appeared in Paramount+ miniseries One Night alongside Yael Stone, Jodie Whittaker, and others. The same year, she appeared in the second season of Foxtel series Love Me.

On 19 August 2024, da Silva was announced as part of Ensemble Theatre's The Lover & The Dumb Waiter for its 2025 season. In 2022, da Silva appeared in Who's Afraid? alongside Danielle Cormack.

On 12 April 2026, Channel 7 confirmed da Silva had joined the cast of Home and Away as Dr Amelia Carlisle. da Silva revealed that she was excited to return to the bay, and said the role was a 'no-brainer' as working in Sydney meant she could be around her family more while filming. She made her first appearance on 11 June 2026, during the show's thirty–ninth season.

On 24 July 2026, da Silva was announced for the Wentworth spinoff titled Wentworth: Halfway Home, she would reprise the role of Franky Doyle more than seven years after her last appearance as Franky.

== Production company ==
Da Silva and Wentworth co-star Danielle Cormack started the production company Four One One Productions. They produced the play Who's Afraid? in 2022, which was their first production with their company. In 2023, da Silva and Cormack directed the short film Why We Fight with Four One One.

== Other activities ==
In February 2014, she was announced as the first National Champion of UN Women Australia, for which she supported women's empowerment and gender equality at events around the country.

As of 2024, Da Silva is an ambassador for SmartFone Flick Fest (SF3), a film festival held annually in Sydney.

== Personal life ==
In April 2018, da Silva announced that she was expecting her first child, and gave birth to a daughter in July 2018.

== Filmography ==
=== Film ===
Year	Title	Role	Notes
2006	Final Call	Pharmacist	Short film
2008	The List	Subiaco's Ex-wife	Short film
2015	Drama	Nana	Feature film
2018	The Tangle	Francesca	Also associate producer
2022	Carmen	Julieanne	Musical drama film
2024	Why We Fight	—	Short film. Producer
2025	Play Dirty	Grace Webb (uncredited)	Feature film

=== Television ===
Year	Title	Role	Notes	Ref.
2005	All Saints	Sasha Fernandez	Season 8, 15 episodes	
2006	Home and Away	Jane Sims	Season 19, episode 26	
2007	Dangerous	Erica 'EC' Eulestra	Miniseries, 8 episodes (main role)	
2007	East West 101	Lily	Season 1, episode 4: "Haunt for the Killer"	
2008–2011	Rush	Stella Dagostino	Seasons 1–4, 70 episodes (main role)	
2009	Carla Cametti PD	Lisa Testro	Miniseries, 6 episodes (main role)	
2011	Cop Hard	Syvan	Season 1, 2 episodes	
2012	Stuffed	Easter	TV short	
2013–2019	Wentworth	Franky Doyle	Seasons 1–6 (main role), season 7 (guest), 57 episodes	
2016	Gortimer Gibbon's Life on Normal Street	Dvora Henwick	Season 2, episode 14: "Gortimer and the Jacks of All Trades"	
2016–2021	Doctor Doctor	Charlie Knight	Seasons 1–5, 48 episodes (main role)	
2019	Harrow	Danica	Season 2, episode 7: "Parce Sepulto"	
2023	Love Me	Amy	Miniseries, season 2, 4 episodes	
2023	One Night	Simone	6 episodes (main role)	
2024	Bump	Jane	Season 5, episode 4: "In Records"	
2026–present	Home and Away	Amelia Carlisle	Season 39– (main role)	
2026-present	Wentworth: Halfway Home	Franky Doyle	TV series	

=== Other appearances ===
Year	Title	Role	Notes	Ref
2014	Wentworth: A Look Back	Herself	TV special	
2014–2018	Inside Wentworth Behind the Scenes	Herself	Miniseries, seasons 1–5, 13 episodes	
2016	An Audience with the Cast of Wentworth	Herself	TV special	
2016	Lady Parts TV Presents	Herself	Podcast series; season 1, episode 4	
2017	Have You Been Paying Attention?	Guest Quiz Master	Season 5, episode 2	
2019	Wentworth: Behind the Bars	Herself	TV special	
2022	Hot off the Press	Herself	Podcast series, season 2, episode 3	

== Stage ==
Year	Title	Role	Notes	Ref
2009	The Hayloft Project	Mary	STC	
2009	This Is Our Youth	Jessica Goldman	Fortyfivedownstairs, Melbourne	
2011	A Behanding in Spokane	Marilyn	MTC	
2012	Blood Wedding	Wife	Malthouse Theatre, Melbourne	
2022	Who's Afraid?	Cast	Belvoir St Theatre, Sydney	
2023	The Memory of Water	Vi	Ensemble Theatre, Sydney	
2025	The Lover & The Dumb Waiter	Wife / Mistress	Ensemble Theatre, Sydney	

== Awards ==
Year	Award	Category	TV show	Result	Ref
2008	Logie Award	Graham Kennedy Award for Most Outstanding New Talent	Dangerous	Nominated	
2014	ASTRA Award	Most Outstanding Performance by an Actor (Female)	Wentworth	Won	
2015	ASTRA Award	Most Outstanding Performance by an Actor (Female)	Wentworth	Nominated	
2015	Logie Award	Most Outstanding Actress	Wentworth	Nominated	
