= Acorn TV =

American subscription video streaming service

- Website type: OTT platform
- Country of origin: United Kingdom
- Area served: North America, Western Europe and parts of the Indo-Pacific
- Owners: AMC Global Media (83%); RLJ Companies (17%)
- Parent: RLJE Films
- Website: acorn.tv
- Registration: Required
- Launched: 2011; 15 years ago
- Current status: Active

Acorn TV is a British–American subscription streaming service offering television programming from Australia, Canada, other Commonwealth countries, Spain, Ireland, New Zealand, and the United Kingdom. In other countries, it is available on a variety of devices including Amazon Fire TV, Apple TV, Android TV, Chromecast, and Roku. The service is owned by RLJ Entertainment, a joint venture between AMC Global Media (which owns a controlling 83% stake) and the RLJ Companies (which owns the remaining 17%).

== History ==
Acorn Media Group has distributed British television in the United States since 1994, originally selling VHS tapes before moving into DVD and Blu-ray media. Continuing the company's expansion into new formats, Acorn TV launched as a subsection of Acorn's direct-to-consumer e-commerce website in 2011. In 2013, Acorn TV was relaunched as a standalone service with expanded content offerings and monthly and annual subscription options. In 2013, the service began offering exclusive content, starting with the United States premiere of Doc Martin, Series 6. In 2015, Acorn TV was the only niche streaming service to have a program nominated for an Emmy when Curtain: Poirot's Last Case was nominated for Outstanding Television Movie. As of December 31, 2016, it had 430,000 paid subscribers.

Acorn TV launched in the United Kingdom as a service in its own right on April 29, 2020.

On 24 November 2022, Acorn TV announced without further elaboration that it would no longer be available in South Africa by the end of 2022, and requested that subscribers cancel their memberships. The service previously launched in South Africa from December 2018.

On August 29, 2023, it was announced that Acorn TV would end its services in Portugal as of September 29, 2023.

On December 20, 2023, Acorn TV announced that it would not be available in Latin America after February 6, 2024.

== Programming ==
Acorn TV offers a combination of new and classic mysteries, dramas, comedies, and documentaries. The service licenses content from producers and distributors including ITV, Channel 4, BBC Studios, All3Media, DRG, ZDF, and Content Media.

=== Original programming ===
Because its parent company, RLJ Entertainment, has a 64% stake in Agatha Christie Limited, the licensing arm of the Christie estate, Acorn TV was able to offer the United States premieres of the final episodes of Agatha Christie's Poirot in summer 2014, BBC co-production Partners in Crime in September 2015, and The Witness for the Prosecution in 2017.

RLJ Entertainment also owns all rights to Foyle's War, allowing Acorn TV to offer the United States premiere of the final season in 2015. Subsequent original series include Agatha Raisin, Close to the Enemy, The Level, Striking Out, Queens of Mystery, Dead Still, and Ms Fisher's Modern Murder Mysteries. On October 20, 2020, it was announced that the series Dalgliesh would premiere in 2021.

=== American premieres ===
Since its launch, Acorn TV has offered the American premieres of some or all seasons of British series including Detectorists, Vera, Inspector George Gently, and Midsomer Murders. After initially focusing exclusively on programming from the United Kingdom, Acorn TV expanded its content offering to include programs from other territories, including Australia's A Place to Call Home, Miss Fisher's Murder Mysteries, Jack Irish, and Janet King, New Zealand's The Brokenwood Mysteries, the Australian–New Zealand series 800 Words, Canada's Murdoch Mysteries and 19-2, and Ireland's Clean Break and Striking Out. In 2015, the service began offering foreign-language dramas. The service also offers a selection of documentaries, including historical, travel, arts, and science titles.

On August 5, 2019, the Australian–New Zealand mystery series My Life Is Murder premiered on Acorn. On September 30, 2020, it was announced that the Irish drama series The South Westerlies premiered on November 9, 2020. On October 27, 2020, it was announced that the miniseries A Suitable Boy will premiere on December 7, 2020.

== See also ==
- Acorn DVD
- BritBox
- Philo
- AMC+
- Shudder
- Allblk
- Amazon Prime Video
- List of streaming media services
