= Rodger Corser =

Australian actor (born 1973)

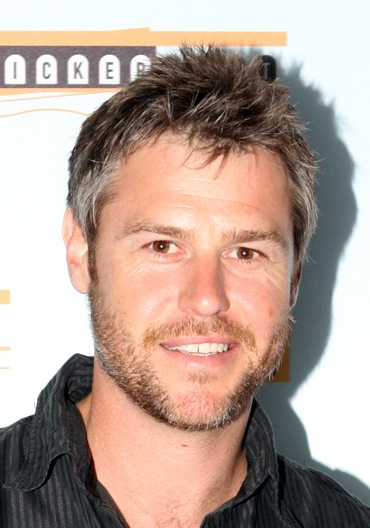
- Born: 28 February 1973 (age 53); Victoria, Australia
- Occupations: Actor, television presenter
- Years active: 2000–present
- Spouse: Renae Berry (m. 2007)
- Children: 4

Rodger Corser (born 28 February 1973) is an Australian actor and television presenter.

== Early life ==
Corser graduated from Deakin University in 1996 with an Honours B.A. in Media Studies. He formed a band called Tender Prey when he was 16. They played their majority of gigs at the Shoppingtown Hotel, Doncaster, Victoria. He was also lead vocalist in a band called Stone the Crows.

== Career ==
Corser's first big role came in 1998, when he was cast in a leading role (from a field of 6,000) in the Australian production of the musical Rent. Corser portrayed the role of Roger, an HIV-positive musician. The show played seasons in Sydney and Melbourne and launched Corser into a successful career in television. His other theatre credits include Leader of the Pack and Below. In 2009, he took to the stage in the theatre production Secret Bridesmaids ' Business.

Corser played Detective Senior Constable George Newhouse in the final four episodes of police procedural series Water Rats in 2001. Following this, he appeared in Australian drama series McLeod's Daughters as Peter Johnson, from 2001 to 2004. He then played the lead role of Alex in 2005 Australian movie Let Me Not. That same year, he starred as photographer Adam Logan in the Australian comedy-drama series Last Man Standing in 2005. From there, he played Dr Hugh Sullivan in long-running soap opera Home and Away, from 2006 to 2007.

In 2008, Corser was cast as Detective Senior Sergeant Steve Owen in the first installment of Nine Network crime series Underbelly, based on the Melbourne gangland killings.

From 2008 to 2011, Corser starred as Lawson Blake in the Australian police drama Rush. The series, following the lives of members of the prestigious Tactical Response team (TR), was based on the real life Victoria Police Critical Incident Response Team, a highly mobile unit that fills the operational gap between general duties police and the SWAT-like Special Operations Group.

Corser narrated the first season of Network Ten’s factual TV series Recruits, which followed people in training to become police officers in the New South Wales Police Force and new recruits just starting out on the beat. In 2010, he started work on supernatural comedy-drama series Spirited, on the W channel on Foxtel.

From 2012 to 2014, Corser starred in the Network Ten 1970s period drama Puberty Blues as philanderer Ferris Hennessy, abusive husband to Yvonne, and father to series protagonist, Gary. During this time, he also starred alongside Rachel Griffiths, in the American television series Camp in 2013.

He then starred in the Network Ten drama Party Tricks as Victorian Opposition Leader David McLeod alongside Asher Keddie.

From 2015 to 2019, Corser has co-starred as John Doe in the ABC series Glitch, as well as in the 2015 ABC series The Beautiful Lie, a modern adaptation of Anna Karenina, as Xander Ivin. He then appeared as Chief Inspector Frank Carlyle in The Doctor Blake Mysteries in episodes during 2016 and 2017.

From 2016 to 2021, Corser starred as the titular doctor, Dr Hugh Knight in Channel 9 series Doctor Doctor. His role on the show saw him nominated for the Gold Logie three times (in 2017, 2018 and 2019). Also at the Logie Awards, he has been nominated for the Most Popular Actor award three times (from 2017 to 2019) and the Most Outstanding Actor award twice (2017 and 2018).

More recently, Corser has appeared in the second, third and fourth series of Paramount+ drama series Five Bedrooms, 2022 miniseries Thai Cave Rescue and the first season of British series Queen of Oz, alongside Catherine Tate. His other international appearances have included NBC miniseries The Starter Wife with Debra Messing and Judy Davis, and the NBC series Camp opposite Rachel Griffiths.

Corser has narrated the most recent season of RPA on the Nine Network. He also hosted two seasons of the Australian version of reality series The Traitors. In October 2024, he was announced as host of Channel Nine game show The Floor, for 2025.

Corser has also appeared in numerous television advertisements, most notably for car maker Hyundai.

== Personal life ==
Corser's oldest daughter, Zipporah Mary Corser, was born in 2002 from his previous relationship with singer Christine Anu.

In 2007 Corser married Renae Berry. The couple learned in 2009 that they were expecting their first child. The pair now has three children.

== Filmography ==
=== Film ===
Year	Title	Role	Notes
2007	Let Me Not	Alex the Architect	
2007	Passing Through	Julian	Short
2009	Before Sundown	Father	Short
2011	Burning Man	Jack	
2011	The Cup	Jason McCartney	
2014	Love Is Now	Const. Richards	
2019	Rocky & Me	Dad	Short

=== Television ===
Year	Title	Role	Notes	Ref
2000	BeastMaster	Sararmago	1 episode	
2001	Water Rats	Det. George Newhouse	4 episodes	
2001–04	McLeod's Daughters	Peter Johnson	19 episodes	
2003–04	Stingers	Karl De Groot	2 episodes	
2005	Last Man Standing	Adam Logan	22 episodes	
2006–07	Home and Away	Dr. Hugh Sullivan	28 episodes	
2007	The Starter Wife	Larry Hamill	2 episodes	
2008	Underbelly	Steve Owen	13 episodes	
2008–11	Rush	Lawson Blake	70 episodes	
2010–11	Spirited	Steve Darling	18 episodes	
2012–14	Puberty Blues	Ferris Hennessey	15 episodes	
2013	Paper Giants: Magazine Wars	Harry M. Miller	2 episodes	
2013	Camp	Roger Shepard	10 episodes	
2014	Party Tricks	David McLeod	6 episodes	
2015	Miss Fisher's Murder Mysteries	Capt. Lyle Compton	1 episode	
2015–19	Glitch	John Doe/William Blackburn	18 episodes	
2015	The Beautiful Lie	Xander Ivin	6 episodes	
2016	The Doctor Blake Mysteries	Frank Carlyle	7 episodes	
2016–21	Doctor Doctor	Hugh Knight	48 episodes	
2021–23	Five Bedrooms	Stuart Wendell	12 episodes	
2022	Thai Cave Rescue	Dr. Richard Harris	2 episodes	
2023	Queen of Oz	Teddy	4 episodes	

2026 A Remarkable Place To Die Donald Peterson 1 episode

=== Self appearances / Voice ===
Year	Title	Role	Notes	Ref.
2009	Recruits	Narrator (voice)	TV series	
2011	Recruits: Paramedics	Narrator (voice)	TV miniseries	
2019	Who Do You Think You Are?	Himself	1 episode	
2019	Play School	Himself	1 episode	
2022–23	The Traitors	Himself	Host	
2023	RPA	Himself	Narrator	
2025–present	The Floor	Himself	Host	

== Award nominations ==
Year	Association	Category	Nominated work	Result	Ref.
2011	Astra Awards	Most Outstanding Performance by an Actor (Male)	Spirited	Nominated	
2017	Logie Awards	Gold Logie Award for Most Popular Personality on Australian Television	Doctor Doctor	Nominated	
2017	Logie Awards	Best Actor	Doctor Doctor	Nominated	
2017	Logie Awards	Most Outstanding Actor	Doctor Doctor	Nominated	
2018	Logie Awards	Gold Logie Award for Most Popular Personality on Australian Television	Doctor Doctor	Nominated	
2018	Logie Awards	Most Popular Actor	Doctor Doctor	Nominated	
2018	Logie Awards	Most Outstanding Actor	Doctor Doctor	Nominated	
2018	TV Tonight Awards	Favourite Male	Doctor Doctor	Nominated	
2019	Logie Awards	Gold Logie Award for Most Popular Personality on Australian Television	Doctor Doctor	Nominated	
2019	Logie Awards	Most Popular Actor	Doctor Doctor	Nominated	
2022	Logie Awards	Most Popular Actor	Doctor Doctor	Nominated	
