= List of Stan original programming =

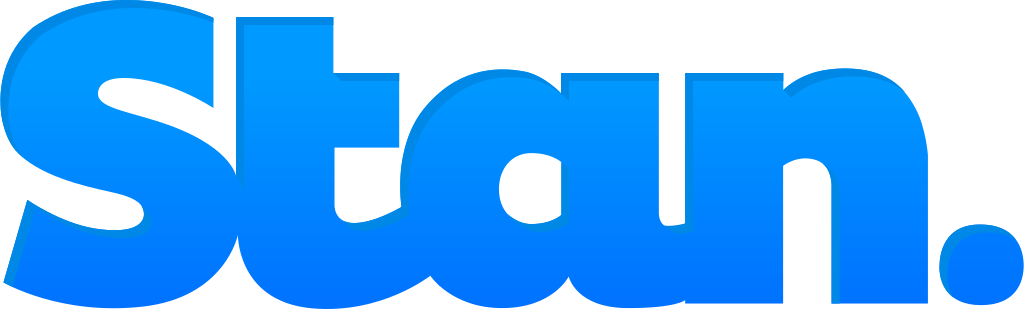

Stan is an Australian subscription video streaming service owned by Nine Entertainment Co. Initially a joint venture between Nine Entertainment Co. and Fairfax Media, Stan launched on 26 January 2015. Nine Entertainment acquired Fairfax Media in 2018, making Stan a wholly owned subsidiary of Nine Digital. Stan announced its first commissioned series, No Activity, on 1 May 2015, which later premiered on 22 October 2015.

== Original programming ==
=== Drama ===
Title	Genre	Premiere	Seasons	Length	Status
Wolf Creek	Survival thriller	12 May 2016	2 season, 12 episodes	43–61 min	Ended
Romper Stomper	Crime drama	1 January 2018	1 season, 6 episodes	46–55 min	Ended
Bloom	Science fiction romantic drama	1 January 2019	2 season, 12 episodes	43–53 min	Ended
The Commons	Dystopian thriller	25 December 2019	1 season, 8 episodes	43–55 min	Ended
Eden	Coming-of-age fantasy drama	11 June 2021	1 season, 8 episodes	45–49 min	Ended
Bali 2002	Docudrama	25 September 2022	4 episodes	47–51 min	Miniseries
Bad Behaviour	Teen drama	17 February 2023	4 episodes	54–57 min	Miniseries
Year Of	Teen drama	9 June 2023	1 season, 10 episodes	26–32 min	Ended
Scrublands	Crime thriller	16 November 2023	2 seasons, 8 episodes	36–40 min	Renewed
Exposure	Mystery thriller	20 June 2024	1 season, 6 episodes	48–56 min	Ended
Critical Incident	Psychological drama	12 August 2024	1 season, 6 episodes	46–50 min	Ended
Invisible Boys	Coming-of-age drama	13 February 2025	1 season, 10 episodes	27–31 min	Ended
The Assassin	Crime thriller	25 July 2025	1 season, 6 episodes	46–52 min	Renewed
Watching You	Psychological thriller	3 October 2025	1 season, 6 episodes	44–50 min	Pending
The Killings at Parrish Station	Crime thriller	24 June 2026	1 season, 6 episodes	44–50 min	Pending
The F Ward	Medical drama	17 July 2026	1 season, 6 episodes	44–49 min	Renewed

=== Comedy ===
Title	Genre	Premiere	Seasons	Length	Status
No Activity	Crime comedy	22 October 2015	2 seasons, 12 episodes	23–29 min	Ended
The Other Guy	Comedy drama	17 August 2017	2 seasons, 12 episodes	27–34 min	Ended
Bump	Comedy drama	1 January 2021	5 seasons, 50 episodes	26–33 min	Ended
Caught	Satire	28 September 2023	1 season, 6 episodes	29–33 min	Ended
Thou Shalt Not Steal	Dark crime comedy	17 October 2024	1 season, 8 episodes	21–28 min	Ended
He Had It Coming	Dark crime comedy	20 November 2025	1 season, 8 episodes	23–25 min	Pending
Sunny Nights	Crime comedy	26 December 2025	1 season, 8 episodes	44–52 min	Pending
Dear Life	Dark comedy	1 January 2026	6 episodes	55–60 min	Miniseries
Gnomes	Comedy horror	8 October 2026	1 season, 6 episodes	27–33 min	Pending

=== Unscripted ===
==== Docuseries ====
Title	Genre	Subject	Seasons	Length	Status
After the Night	True crime	29 November 2020	4 episodes	49–50 min	Miniseries
Show Me the Money	Sports	10 March 2022	3 episodes	49–53 min	Ended (Note: Season 2 was released as a documentary film.)
Dawn of the Dolphins	Sports	6 March 2023	3 episodes	57–65 min	Miniseries
The Wallabies: Inside Rugby World Cup 2023	Sports	22 February 2024	3 episodes	62–63 min	Miniseries
Revealed: Death Cap Murders	True crime	14 September 2025	3 episodes	55 min	Miniseries

==== Reality ====
Title	Genre	Premiere	Seasons	Length	Status
Drag Race Down Under	Reality competition	1 May 2021	4 seasons, 32 episodes	52–62 min	Ended
Love Triangle	Dating show	6 October 2022	3 seasons, 24 episodes	47–68 min	Renewed
Drag Race Down Under vs. the World	Reality competition	24 July 2026	1 season, 8 episodes	61–68 min	Pending
Unskilled Adult	Comedy reality	1 November 2026	1 season, 8 episodes	53–54 min	Pending

==== Variety ====
Title	Genre	Premiere	Seasons	Length	Status
MAFS: After the Dinner Party	Aftershow	26 March 2026	1 season, 10 episodes	42–57 min	Renewed

=== Co-productions ===
These shows have been commissioned by Stan with an international partner.

Title	Genre	Partner/Country	Premiere	Seasons	Length	Status
The Gloaming	Crime drama	ABC Signature/United States	1 January 2020	1 season, 8 episodes	50–55 min	Ended
The Tourist	Mystery thriller	BBC One/United Kingdom; HBO Max/United States; ZDF/Germany	2 January 2022	2 seasons, 12 episodes	56–59 min	Ended
Wolf Like Me	Dark romantic comedy	Peacock/United States	13 January 2022	2 seasons, 13 episodes	23–29 min	Ended
Last Light	Thriller	MBC Group/Middle East; Peacock/United States; Viaplay/Nordic countries	8 September 2022	5 episodes	43–44 min	Miniseries
Black Snow	Crime drama	Sundance Now/United States	1 January 2023	2 seasons, 12 episodes	49–53 min	Season 3 due to premiere 1 January 2027
Totally Completely Fine	Dark comedy	Sundance Now/United States	20 April 2023	1 season, 6 episodes	47–50 min	Ended
Ten Pound Poms	Period drama	BBC One/United Kingdom	15 May 2023	2 seasons, 12 episodes	59–60 min	Ended
Prosper	Family drama	Lionsgate/United States	18 January 2024	1 season, 8 episodes	72–73 min	Ended
Gray	Thriller	Lionsgate/United States	8 March 2024	1 season, 8 episodes	30–35 min	Ended
Population 11	Crime comedy thriller	Lionsgate/United States	14 March 2024	1 season, 12 episodes	25–29 min	Ended
The Tattooist of Auschwitz	Period drama	Peacock/United States; Sky Atlantic/United Kingdom	2 May 2024	6 episodes	50–58 min	Miniseries
Hotel Cocaine	Crime drama	MGM+/United States	17 June 2024	1 season, 8 episodes	65–78 min	Ended
Good Cop/Bad Cop	Crime comedy	The CW/United States; The Roku Channel/United States	20 February 2025	1 season, 8 episodes	43 min	Ended
The Hack	True crime drama	ITVX/United Kingdom	24 September 2025	1 season, 7 episodes	48–51 min	Miniseries
Lord of the Flies	Coming-of-age survival drama	BBC One/United Kingdom	8 February 2026	4 episodes	59–61 min	Miniseries

=== Continuations ===
These shows have been picked up by Stan for additional seasons after having previous seasons on another network.

Title	Genre	Prev. network(s)	Premiere	Seasons	Length	Status
Plonk (season 2) (Note: Listed as a 'Stan Exclusive' despite being an original series.)	Comedy	Eleven	1 June 2015	1 season, 6 episodes	30 min	Ended

=== Specials ===
These programs are one-time events related to other series.

Title	Genre	Premiere	Length
No Activity: The Night Before Christmas	Comedy	14 December 2018	50 min
Dom and Adrian: 2020	Mockumentary	13 December 2020	33 min

=== Exclusive international distribution ===
These shows have been acquired by Stan for exclusive release within Australia and are marketed as original series, unlike most exclusively distributed content which is branded under a separate "only on Stan" banner.

Title	Genre	Original network/Country	Premiere	Seasons	Length	Status
Philip K Dick's Electric Dreams	Science fiction	Channel 4/United Kingdom; Amazon Prime Video/United States	18 September 2017	10 episodes	49–55 min	Miniseries
No Activity (U.S.)	Crime comedy	Paramount+/United States	20 November 2017	4 seasons, 32 episodes	25–33 min	Ended
Poker Face	Mystery comedy drama	Peacock/United States	27 January 2023	2 seasons, 22 episodes	47–67 min	Ended

== Original films ==
=== Feature films ===
Title	Genre	Premiere	Runtime
The Second	Thriller	5 July 2018	1 h 32 min
True History of the Kelly Gang	Australian Western	26 January 2020	2 h 6 min
Relic	Horror drama	10 July 2020	1 h 30 min
I Am Woman	Biopic	28 August 2020	1 h 57 min
A Sunburnt Christmas	Holiday comedy	11 December 2020	1 h 31 min
Nitram	Psychological drama	24 November 2021	1 h 52 min
Christmas on the Farm	Holiday romantic comedy	1 December 2021	1 h 26 min
Gold	Survival thriller	26 January 2022	1 h 37 min
Nude Tuesday	Gibberish romantic comedy	7 July 2022	1 h 40 min
Poker Face	Crime thriller	22 November 2022	1 h 35 min
Christmas Ransom	Holiday comedy	1 December 2022	1 h 24 min
Transfusion	Crime thriller	20 January 2023	1 h 46 min
The Portable Door	Fantasy adventure	7 April 2023	1 h 55 min
Jones Family Christmas	Holiday family comedy	23 November 2023	1 h 37 min
Windcatcher	Family fantasy adventure	28 March 2024	2 h 6 min
Nugget Is Dead	Holiday comedy	21 November 2024	1 h 27 min
The Surfer	Psychological thriller	15 June 2025	1 h 32 min
One More Shot	Time loop romantic comedy	12 October 2025	1 h 31 min
Bump: A Christmas Film	Holiday comedy	30 November 2025	1 h 31 min
Whale Shark Jack	Family adventure	2 April 2026	1 h 26 min
Beast	Sports drama	4 June 2026	1 h 54 min
Saccharine	Horror	13 August 2026	1 h 53 min

=== Documentaries ===
Title	Premiere	Runtime
Revealed: Amongst Us – Neo Nazi Australia	27 March 2022	1 h 15 min
Revealed: No Mercy, No Remorse	23 June 2022	1 h 18 min
Show Me the Money II	23 February 2023	1 h 40 min
Revealed: Trafficked	12 March 2023	1 h 15 min
Revealed: Reefshot	5 June 2023	1 h 18 min
Revealed: The Cape	18 June 2023	1 h 16 min
Revealed: Danielle Laidley: Two Tribes	19 September 2023	1 h 29 min
Revealed: Ben Roberts-Smith – Truth on Trial	10 December 2023	1 h 30 min
Revealed: How to Poison a Planet	28 April 2024	1 h 36 min
Revealed: Renee Gracie: Fireproof	26 May 2024	1 h 39 min
Trailblazers	4 June 2024	38 min
Revealed: Otto by Otto	16 June 2024	1 h 35 min
Revealed: KillJoy	8 September 2024	1 h 40 min
Revealed: Bribe, Inc.	3 November 2024	1 h 35 min
The Tattooist's Son: Journey to Auschwitz	28 January 2025	1 h 11 min
Revealed: Craig Bellamy: Inside the Storm	9 March 2025	1 h 28 min
Revealed: Joh – Last King of Queensland	7 June 2025	1 h 39 min
Revealed: Building Bad	3 August 2025	1 h 20 min
Revealed: Surviving Malka Leifer	5 October 2025	1 h 35 min
Revealed: Prince No More	6 November 2025	28 min
Revealed: Zyzz and Chestbrah	5 August 2026	1 h 22 min

=== Stand-up comedy specials ===
Title	Premiere	Runtime
Wil Anderson: Fire at Wil (Note: These specials were filmed and released as part of "One Night Stan", a comedy festival hosted by the streaming service.)	24 March 2017	1 h 13 min
Celia Pacquola: The Looking Glass	31 March 2017	1 h 3 min
Tom Ballard: The World Keeps Happening	7 April 2017	1 h 20 min
Sam Simmons: Stop Being Silly	14 April 2017	1 h 24 min
Judith Lucy: Ask No Questions of the Moth	21 April 2017	1 h 14 min
Tom Gleeson: Great	28 April 2017	53 min
Australian Lockdown Comedy Festival (Note: Released as a four-part special.)	9 May 2020	2 h (Note: 30 min per episode.)

== Upcoming original programming ==
=== Drama ===
Title	Genre	Premiere	Seasons	Runtime	Status
McLeod's Daughters	Neo-Western drama	2027	TBA	TBA	Series order
Slander	Legal drama	2027	TBA	TBA	Series order

=== Comedy ===
Title	Genre	Premiere	Seasons	Runtime	Status
Stuck Up & Stupid	Romantic comedy	2027	1 season, 8 episodes	TBA	Filming

=== Unscripted ===
==== Docuseries ====
Title	Subject	Premiere	Seasons	Runtime	Status
Revealed: Into the Night	True crime miniseries	TBA	4 episodes	TBA	Series order

==== Reality ====
Title	Subject	Premiere	Seasons	Runtime	Status
The Block: The House Next Door	Reality	2027	TBA	TBA	Series order

=== Co-productions ===
These shows have been commissioned by Stan with an international partner.

Title	Genre	Partner/Country	Premiere	Seasons	Runtime	Status
Two Birds	Mystery thriller	ITV/United Kingdom	2027	TBA	TBA	Series order
