= Yerin Ha =

Australian actress (born 1998)

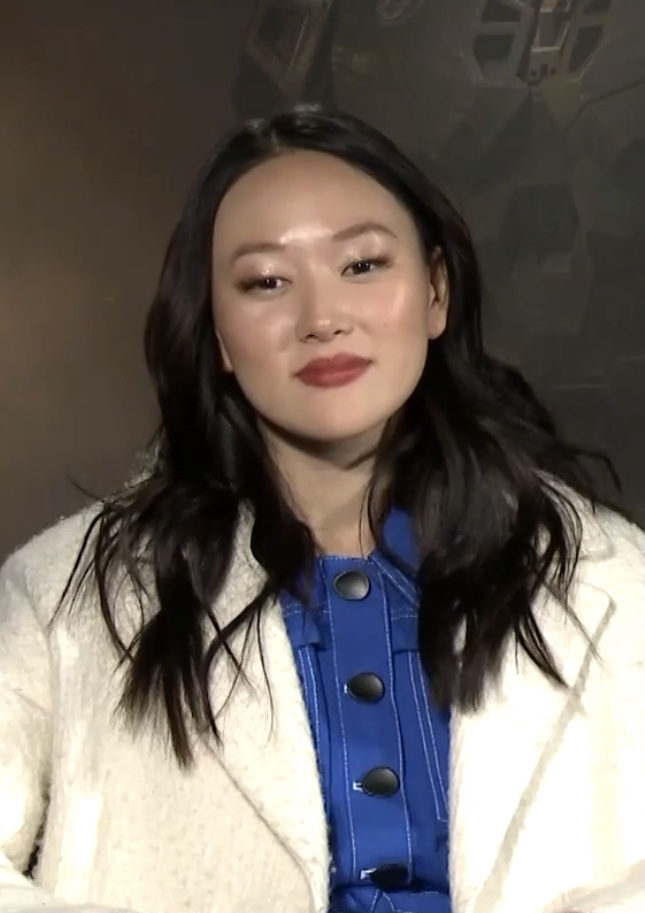
- Ha in 2022
- Born: 16 January 1998 (age 28); Sydney, New South Wales, Australia
- Education: National Institute of Dramatic Art (BFA)
- Occupation: Actress
- Years active: 2019–present
- Relatives: Son Sook (grandmother)

Korean name
- Hangul: 하예린
- RR: Ha Yerin
- MR: Ha Yerin

Yerin Ha (Korean: 하예린; born 16 January 1998) is an Australian actress. On television, she is known for her roles in the Paramount+ series Halo (2022–2024), the Stan miniseries Bad Behaviour (2023), the Netflix series The Survivors (2025), and the period drama Bridgerton (2026) for its fourth series as Sophie Baek.

== Life and career ==
=== 1998–2018: Early life and education ===
Yerin Ha was born on 16 January 1998 in Sydney, Australia, to South Korean parents who met while studying at drama school. Her maternal grandmother is the Korean actress and politician Son Sook. She attended Brigidine College until the end of year 9.

Believing it would be difficult to pursue acting professionally in Australia where there were comparatively few Asian actors on television, on her parents' recommendation, she decided to train in South Korea, and at the age of 15 successfully auditioned for Kaywon High School of Arts in Seoul, where she studied for three years. She later returned to Australia and graduated in 2018 with a Bachelor of Fine Arts degree in acting, majoring in Musical Theatre from the National Institute of Dramatic Art (NIDA) in Sydney.

=== 2019–2023: Career beginnings ===
She played Maurice alongside Mia Wasikowska and Eliza Scanlen in the Sydney Theatre Company's 2019 production of Lord of the Flies at the Roslyn Packer Theatre. She made her television debut with a recurring role in the American-French series Reef Break.

Also in 2019, it was announced that Ha had been cast in the Steven Spielberg-produced television adaptation of the video game Halo, in which she would portray a new character, Kwan Ha. The series premiered on Paramount+ in 2022.

Ha was named a rising star by the Casting Guild of Australia in November 2021. She was billed in the main cast of the ABC TV series Troppo as Ah Rah, and made her feature film debut in Sissy. The latter premiered at the 2022 South by Southwest (SXSW) festival.

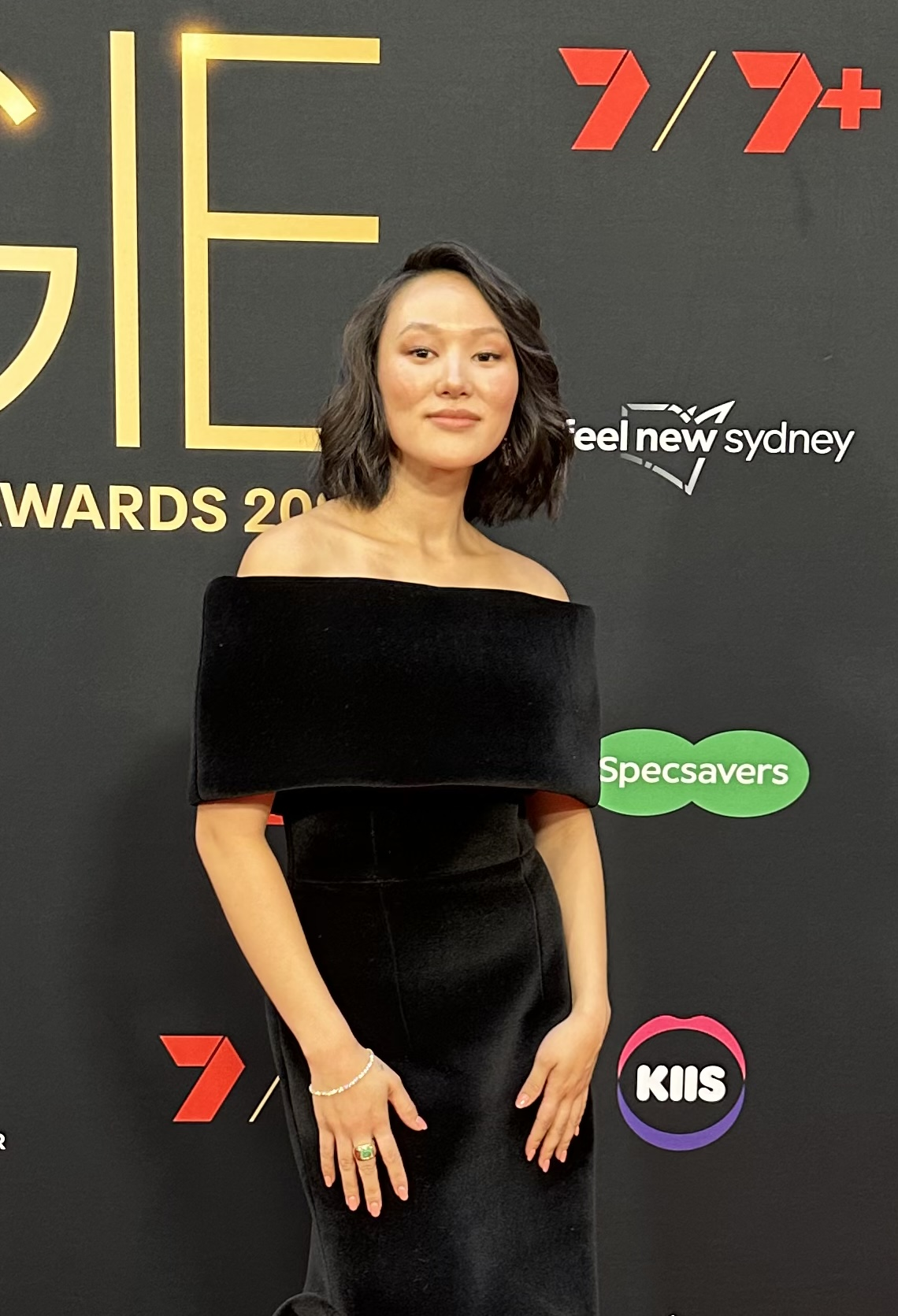
Ha at the 63rd Logie Awards in 2023

In 2023, Ha starred in the Stan series Bad Behaviour, a four-part adaptation of Rebecca Starford's novel of the same name.

=== 2024–present: International breakthrough and Bridgerton ===
Ha appeared in HBO's Dune prequel series, Dune: Prophecy, as Young Kasha; the series was released in November 2024.

In August 2024, Ha was cast as Sophie Baek, the love interest of Benedict Bridgerton, in the fourth series of Bridgerton, based on An Offer from a Gentleman, the third novel in Julia Quinn's Bridgerton series. To honor Ha's South Korean heritage, showrunner Jess Brownell altered the character's last name from Beckett, as it appears in the novel, to Baek. In preparation for the role, Ha created a Spotify playlist that included the song "Into My Heart" (Korean: 그대가 이렇게 내 맘에) by Lee So-ra, as well as tracks by Benjamin Clementine and Billie Eilish. The series premiered on the 29 January 2026. Ha was named the ambassador for the 32nd Annual Actor Awards presented by SAG-AFTRA.

In 2025, Ha starred in the Netflix series The Survivors.

== Filmography ==
Key
| † | Denotes productions that have not yet been released |

=== Films ===
| Year | Title | Role | Notes | Ref. |
|---|---|---|---|---|
| 2022 | Sissy | Tracey | | |

=== Television ===
| Year | Title | Role | Notes | Ref. |
|---|---|---|---|---|
| 2019 | Reef Break | Techie Jane | Recurring role; 6 episodes | |
| 2022 | Troppo | Ah Rah | Main role; 7 episodes (season 1) | |
| 2022–2024 | Halo | Kwan Ha | Main role; 14 episodes | |
| 2023 | Bad Behaviour | Alice | Miniseries; 4 episodes | |
| 2024 | Dune: Prophecy | Young Kasha Jinjo | Recurring role; 3 episodes | |
| 2025 | The Survivors | Mia Chang | Miniseries; 6 episodes | |
| 2026 | Bridgerton | Sophie Bridgerton (née Baek) | Main role; 8 episodes (season 4) | |

=== Audio ===
| Year | Title | Role | Notes | Ref. |
|---|---|---|---|---|
| 2026 | American Hagwon | Narrator | Hachette Audio | |

=== Music videos ===
| Year | Title | Artist | Notes | Ref. |
|---|---|---|---|---|
| 2016 | I Gotta Have You | Fluir & Jesse Marantz | | |

== Stage ==
| Year | Title | Role | Notes | Ref. |
|---|---|---|---|---|
| 2019 | Lord of the Flies | Maurice | Roslyn Packer Theatre | |
| 2025 | The Maids | Madame | Donmar Warehouse | |
| 2026 | The Maids | Madame | St. Ann's Warehouse | |

== Awards and nominations ==
| Year | Award | Category | Nominated work | Result | Ref. |
|---|---|---|---|---|---|
| 2023 | Logie Awards | Most Outstanding Supporting Actress | Bad Behaviour | Nominated | |
| 2025 | ELLE Australia Next Gen Awards | Next Gen Actor Award | Yerin Ha | Won | |
| 2026 | Gold Derby TV Awards | Drama Actress | Bridgerton S4 | Nominated | |
| 2026 | Gold Derby TV Awards | Breakthrough Performer of the Year | Bridgerton S4 | Nominated | |
| 2026 | National Film Awards UK | Best Newcomer | Bridgerton S4 | Nominated | |
| 2026 | National Television Awards | Best Performer | Bridgerton | Nominated | |
| 2026 | SEC Awards | Best Actress in an International Series | Bridgerton | Won | |
| 2026 | WhatsOnStage Awards | Best Supporting Performer in a Play | The Maids | Nominated | |

== Other accolades ==
=== Listicles ===
Name of publisher, year listed, name of listicle, and placement
| Publisher | Year | Listicle | Placement | Ref. |
|---|---|---|---|---|
| Casting Guild of Australia | 2021 | Rising Stars for 2021 | Placed | |
| Variety | 2026 | Power of Young Hollywood | Placed | |
