= Logie Awards of 2023 =

Australian television awards ceremony

63rd Logie Awards
- Date: 30 July 2023
- Site: The Star, Sydney, New South Wales
- Hosted by: Sam Pang
- Official website: tvweeklogies.com.au

Highlights
- Gold Logie: Sonia Kruger
- Hall of Fame: Brian Walsh
- Most awards: The Twelve and Colin from Accounts (3)
- Most nominations: The Twelve (9)

Television coverage
- Network: Seven Network

The 63rd Annual TV Week Logie Awards ceremony was held on 30 July 2023 at The Star, Sydney, and broadcast on the Seven Network. The ceremony was hosted by Sam Pang, making it the first time in eleven years that the event returned to having a solo host.

== Winners and nominees ==
Nominees were announced on 19 June 2023.

=== Gold Logie ===
Most Popular Personality on Australian Television
- Sonia Kruger in Big Brother, Dancing with The Stars and The Voice (Seven Network)
  - Hamish Blake in Lego Masters (Nine Network)
  - Julia Morris in I'm a Celebrity...Get Me Out of Here! and Taskmaster Australia (Network 10)
  - Leigh Sales in 7.30 (ABC)
  - Mark Coles Smith in Mystery Road: Origin (ABC)
  - Osher Günsberg in The Bachelors Australia and The Masked Singer Australia (Network 10)
  - Shaun Micallef in Shaun Micallef's Mad as Hell (ABC)

=== Acting/Presenting ===
Most Popular Actor	Most Popular Actress
Sam Neill in The Twelve (Binge/Foxtel); James Stewart in Home and Away (Seven Network); Lincoln Younes in After the Verdict (Nine Network), Last King of the Cross (Paramount+) and Barons (ABC); Mark Coles Smith in Mystery Road: Origin (ABC); Patrick Brammall in Colin from Accounts (Binge) and Summer Love (ABC); Ray Meagher in Home and Away (Seven Network)	Kitty Flanagan in Fisk (ABC); Ada Nicodemou in Home and Away (Seven Network); Celeste Barber in Wellmania (Netflix); Emily Symons in Home and Away (Seven Network); Julia Zemiro in Fisk (ABC); Lynne McGranger in Home and Away (Seven Network)
Most Outstanding Actor	Most Outstanding Actress
Patrick Brammall in Colin from Accounts (Binge); Mark Coles Smith in Mystery Road: Origin (ABC); Richard Roxburgh in Bali 2002 (Stan); Sam Neill in The Twelve (Binge/Foxtel); Tim Draxl in In Our Blood (ABC); Tim Minchin in Upright (Binge/Foxtel)	Harriet Dyer in Colin from Accounts (Binge); Claudia Jessie in Bali 2002 (Stan); Claudia Karvan in Bump (Stan); Kate Mulvany in The Twelve (Binge/Foxtel); Marta Dusseldorp in The Twelve (Binge/Foxtel); Milly Alcock in Upright (Binge/Foxtel)
Most Outstanding Supporting Actor	Most Outstanding Supporting Actress
Thomas Weatherall in Heartbreak High (Netflix); Alexander England in Black Snow (Stan); Arka Das in Here Out West (ABC); Clarence Ryan in Mystery Road: Origin (ABC); Hamish Michael in The Twelve (Binge/Foxtel); Luke Arnold in True Colours (SBS)	Brooke Satchwell in The Twelve (Binge/Foxtel); Hayley McElhinney in Mystery Road: Origin (ABC); Miranda Otto in True Colours (SBS); Pallavi Sharda in The Twelve (Binge/Foxtel); Virginia Gay in After The Verdict (Nine Network); Yerin Ha in Bad Behaviour (Stan)
Graham Kennedy Award for Most Popular New Talent	Bert Newton Award for Most Popular Presenter
Amy Shark in Australian Idol (Seven Network); Ayesha Madon in Heartbreak High (Netflix); Chloé Hayden in Heartbreak High (Netflix); Flex Mami in Love Island Australia (Nine Network); Kween Kong in RuPaul's Drag Race Down Under (Stan); Lilliana Bowrey in Surviving Summer (Netflix)	Tony Armstrong in A Dog's World with Tony Armstrong (ABC); Hamish Blake in Lego Masters (Nine Network); Julia Morris in I'm a Celebrity...Get Me Out of Here! and Taskmaster Australia (Network 10); Scott Cam in The Block (Nine Network); Shaun Micallef in Shaun Micallef's Mad as Hell (ABC); Sonia Kruger in Big Brother, Dancing with the Stars and The Voice (Seven Network)

=== Most Popular Programs ===
Most Popular Drama Series, Miniseries or Telemovie	Most Popular Entertainment Program
Home and Away (Seven Network); Heartbreak High (Netflix); Mystery Road: Origin (ABC); Savage River (ABC); The Twelve (Binge/Foxtel); Underbelly: Vanishing Act (Nine Network)	Gogglebox Australia (Foxtel/Network 10); Australia's Got Talent (Seven Network); Gruen (ABC); Hard Quiz (ABC); Lego Masters (Nine Network); The Voice (Seven Network)
Most Popular Reality Program	Most Popular Lifestyle Program
MasterChef Australia: Fans & Favourites (Network 10); Farmer Wants A Wife (Seven Network); Hunted Australia (Network 10); I'm a Celebrity...Get Me Out of Here! (Network 10); Married at First Sight (Nine Network); The Block (Nine Network)	Travel Guides (Nine Network); A Dog's World With Tony Armstrong (ABC); Back Roads (ABC); Better Homes and Gardens (Seven Network); Gardening Australia (ABC); Selling Houses Australia (Foxtel)
Most Popular Comedy Program	Most Popular Current Affairs Program
Have You Been Paying Attention? (Network 10); Fisk (ABC); Shaun Micallef's Mad as Hell (ABC); The Front Bar (Seven Network); The Hundred with Andy Lee (Nine Network); Wellmania (Netflix)	Australian Story (ABC); 60 Minutes (Nine Network); 7.30 (ABC); A Current Affair (Nine Network); Foreign Correspondent (ABC); Four Corners (ABC)

=== Most Outstanding Programs ===
Most Outstanding Drama Series, Miniseries or Telemovie	Most Outstanding Comedy Program
The Twelve (Binge/Foxtel); Black Snow (Stan); Five Bedrooms (Paramount+); In Our Blood (ABC); Mystery Road: Origin (ABC); Significant Others (ABC)	Colin from Accounts (Binge); Fisk (ABC); Have You Been Paying Attention? (Network 10); Shaun Micallef's Mad as Hell (ABC); Summer Love (ABC); Taskmaster Australia (Network 10)
Most Outstanding Sports Coverage	Most Outstanding Factual or Documentary Program
State of Origin (Nine Network); 2022 AFL Grand Final (Seven Network); 2022 FIFA World Cup (SBS); 2022 Melbourne Cup Carnival (Network 10); 2023 Australian Open (Nine Network); Birmingham 2022 Commonwealth Games (Seven Network)	The Australian Wars (SBS); Alone Australia (SBS); Australia's Wild Odyssey (ABC); Old People's Home for Teenagers (ABC); Revealed: Trafficked (Stan); Todd Sampson's Mirror Mirror: Love & Hate (Network 10)
Most Outstanding Reality Program	Most Outstanding Entertainment Program
Australian Survivor: Heroes V Villains (Network 10); Hunted Australia (Network 10); I'm a Celebrity...Get Me Out of Here! (Network 10); Married at First Sight (Nine Network); MasterChef Australia: Fans & Favourites (Network 10); The Block (Nine Network)	The Cheap Seats (Network 10); Gruen Nation (ABC); Hard Quiz (ABC); Lego Masters (Nine Network); RuPaul's Drag Race Down Under (Stan); The Masked Singer Australia (Network 10)
Most Outstanding Children's Program	Most Outstanding News Coverage or Public Affairs Report
Crazy Fun Park (ABC); Barrumbi Kids (SBS); Bluey (ABC); Surviving Summer (Netflix); Turn Up The Volume (ABC); Ultimate Classroom (Network 10)	"Saving the Children" (Foreign Correspondent, ABC); "Turkey Earthquake" (7News, Seven Network); "SeaWorld Helicopter Disaster" (A Current Affair, Nine Network); "Somalia: A Story of Survival" (Foreign Correspondent, ABC); "Do No Harm" (Four Corners, ABC); "How Many More" (Four Corners, ABC)

== Changes ==
The Seven Network took over from the Nine Network as host broadcaster. Seven had last broadcast the Logie Awards in 1995.

== Performers ==
- Amy Shark
- Peking Duk with G Flip, May-a and Ayesha Madon
- Kate Miller-Heidke
