= Vikings (TV series) =

Canadian-Irish historical drama television series

- Genre: Historical drama; Action; War
- Created by: Michael Hirst
- Written by: Michael Hirst
- Starring: Travis Fimmel; Katheryn Winnick; Clive Standen; Jessalyn Gilsig; Gustaf Skarsgård; Gabriel Byrne; George Blagden; Donal Logue; Alyssa Sutherland; Linus Roache; Alexander Ludwig; Ben Robson; Kevin Durand; Lothaire Bluteau; John Kavanagh; Peter Franzén; Adam Copeland; Jasper Pääkkönen; Alex Høgh Andersen; Marco Ilsø; David Lindström; Jordan Patrick Smith; Moe Dunford; Jonathan Rhys Meyers; Danila Kozlovsky; Eric Johnson; Georgia Hirst; Ragga Ragnars; Ray Stevenson
- Opening theme: "If I Had a Heart" by Fever Ray
- Composer: Trevor Morris
- Countries of origin: Canada; Ireland
- Original language: English
- No. of seasons: 6
- No. of episodes: 89 (list of episodes)

Production
- Executive producers: Morgan O'Sullivan; Sheila Hockin; Sherry Marsh; Alan Gasmer; James Flynn; John Weber; Michael Hirst
- Producers: Steve Wakefield; Keith Thompson; Sanne Wohlenberg; Liz Gill
- Production locations: Ashford Studios and County Wicklow, Ireland
- Cinematography: John Bartley; PJ Dillon; Owen McPolin; Peter Robertson; Suzie Lavelle
- Editors: Aaron Marshall; Michele Conroy; Don Cassidy; Tad Seaborn; Christopher Donaldson; Dan Briceno
- Running time: 45–50 minutes
- Production companies: TM Productions; Take 5 Productions; Octagon Films (s. 1–4); Shaw Media (s. 1–4); Corus Entertainment (s. 4–6); MGM Television

Original release
- Network: History; Amazon Prime Video (s. 6B)
- Release: March 3, 2013 – March 3, 2021 (Note: The second half of the sixth season concluded on December 30, 2020, when it was released in its entirety on Amazon Prime Video in select countries, ahead of its standard broadcast on History in Canada from January 1 to March 3, 2021.)

Related
- Vikings: Valhalla

Vikings is a historical drama television series created and written by Michael Hirst. A co-production between Canada and Ireland, the series originally premiered on the History Channel on March 3, 2013. The series concluded with its broadcast on History in Canada from January 1 to March 3, 2021, after the second half of the sixth season was released in its entirety on Amazon Prime Video in Ireland on December 30, 2020. A sequel series, titled Vikings: Valhalla, premiered on Netflix on February 25, 2022.

It is inspired by the sagas of Ragnar Lodbrok, a Viking who is one of the best-known legendary Norse heroes and notorious as the scourge of Anglo-Saxon England and West Francia. The series portrays Ragnar as a farmer from the fictional village of Kattegat (not to be confused with the Kattegat sea between Denmark and Sweden) who rises to fame by raiding England and eventually becomes a Scandinavian king, with the support of his family and fellow warriors. In the later seasons, the series follows the fortunes of his sons and their adventures in England, Scandinavia, Kievan Rus', the Mediterranean and North America.

The series's principal cast features Travis Fimmel as Lodbrok ("Lothbrok" in the series), alongside Katheryn Winnick, Clive Standen, Jessalyn Gilsig, Gustaf Skarsgård, Gabriel Byrne, George Blagden, Donal Logue, Alyssa Sutherland, Linus Roache, and Alexander Ludwig. The series was filmed entirely in Ireland, on-location in County Wicklow and at Ashford Studios.

== Premise ==
The series is inspired by the tales of the Norsemen of early medieval Scandinavia. It broadly follows the exploits of the legendary Viking chieftain Ragnar Lothbrok and his crew, family and descendants, as notably laid down in the 13th-century sagas Ragnars saga Loðbrókar and Ragnarssona þáttr, as well as in Saxo Grammaticus' 12th-century work Gesta Danorum. Norse legendary sagas were partially fictional tales based in the Norse oral tradition, written down about 200 to 400 years after the events they describe. Further inspiration is taken from historical sources of the period, such as records of the Viking raid on Lindisfarne depicted in the second episode, or Ahmad ibn Fadlan's 10th-century account of the Varangians. The series begins at the start of the Viking Age, marked by the Lindisfarne raid in 793.

== Cast and characters ==
- Travis Fimmel as Ragnar Lothbrok (seasons 1–4)
- Katheryn Winnick as Lagertha (seasons 1–6)
- Clive Standen as Rollo (seasons 1–4; special appearance season 5)
- Jessalyn Gilsig as Siggy (seasons 1–3)
- Gustaf Skarsgård as Floki (seasons 1–6)
- Gabriel Byrne as Earl Haraldson (season 1)
- George Blagden as Athelstan (seasons 1–3; recurring season 4)
- Donal Logue as Horik of Denmark (seasons 1–2)
- Alyssa Sutherland as Aslaug (seasons 1–4) (Note: Sutherland only appears in one episode of season one, although credited as a main cast member.)
- Linus Roache as Ecbert of Wessex (seasons 2–4)
- Alexander Ludwig as Bjorn Ironside (seasons 2–6)
- Ben Robson as Kalf (seasons 3–4)
- Kevin Durand as Harbard (seasons 3–4)
- Lothaire Bluteau as Charles of West Francia (seasons 3–4)
- John Kavanagh as The Seer (seasons 4–6; recurring seasons 1–3)
- Peter Franzén as Harald Finehair (seasons 4–6)
- Jasper Pääkkönen as Halfdan the Black (seasons 4–6) (Note: Pääkkönen only appears in one episode of season six, although credited as a main cast member.)
- Alex Høgh Andersen as Ivar the Boneless (seasons 4–6)
- Marco Ilsø as Hvitserk (seasons 4–6)
- David Lindström as Sigurd Snake-in-the-Eye (season 4)
- Jordan Patrick Smith as Ubbe (seasons 4–6)
- Moe Dunford as Aethelwulf (seasons 4–5; recurring seasons 2–4)
- Jonathan Rhys Meyers as Bishop Heahmund (seasons 4–5) (Note: Meyers only appears in one episode of season four, although credited as a main cast member.)
- Danila Kozlovsky as Oleg the Prophet (season 6)
- Eric Johnson as Erik (season 6)
- Georgia Hirst as Torvi (season 6; recurring seasons 2–6)
- Ragga Ragnars as Gunnhild (season 6; recurring seasons 5–6)
- Ray Stevenson as Othere (season 6)

== Production ==
=== Season 1 ===
An Irish-Canadian co-production, Vikings was developed and produced by Octagon Films and Take 5 Productions. Michael Hirst, Morgan O'Sullivan, John Weber, Sherry Marsh, Alan Gasmer, James Flynn and Sheila Hockin are credited as executive producers. The first season's budget was of US$40 million.

The series began filming in July 2012 at Ashford Studios in Ireland, which at the time was a newly built facility. This location was chosen for its scenery and tax advantages. On August 16, 2012, longship scenes were filmed at Luggala, as well as on the Poulaphouca Reservoir in the Wicklow Mountains. Seventy percent of the first season was filmed outdoors. Some additional background shots were done in western Norway.

Johan Renck, Ciarán Donnelly and Ken Girotti each directed three episodes. The production team included cinematographer John Bartley, costume designer Joan Bergin, production designer Tom Conroy, composer Trevor Morris and Irish choir Crux Vocal Ensemble, directed by Paul McGough.

=== Season 2 ===
On April 5, 2013, History renewed Vikings for a ten-episode second season. Jeff Woolnough and Kari Skogland joined Ken Girotti and Ciaran Donnelly as directors of the second season.

Two new series regulars were announced on June 11, 2013: Alexander Ludwig, portraying the teenage Björn; and Linus Roache, playing King Ecbert of Wessex. The second season undergoes a jump in time, aging the young Björn (Nathan O'Toole) into an older swordsman portrayed by Ludwig. The older Björn has not seen his father, Ragnar, for "a long period of time". Lagertha remarries to a powerful jarl, a stepfather who provides harsh guidance to Björn. Edvin Endre and Anna Åström signed up for roles in the second season. Endre had the role of Erlendur, one of King Horik's sons.

=== Season 3 ===
Morgan O'Sullivan, Sheila Hockin, Sherry Marsh, Alan Gasmer, James Flynn, John Weber and Michael Hirst are credited as executive producers.

This season was produced by Steve Wakefield and Keith Thompson; Bill Goddard and Séamus McInerney acted as co-producers. The production team for this season included casting directors Frank and Nuala Moiselle; costume designer Joan Bergin; visual effects supervisors Julian Parry and Dominic Remane; stunt action designers Franklin Henson and Richard Ryan; composer Trevor Morris; production designer Mark Geraghty; editors Aaron Marshall for the first, third, fifth, seventh and ninth episodes and Tad Seaborn for the second, fourth, sixth, eighth and tenth episodes; and cinematographer PJ Dillon.

Norwegian music group Wardruna provided much of the background music to the series. Wardruna's founder Einar Selvik also appeared as an actor in the show during the third season, portraying a shaman.

=== Season 4 ===
Michael Hirst announced plans for the fourth season before the third season had begun airing. The fourth season began production in Ireland around the Dublin and Wicklow areas in April 2015. Additional location photography featuring Ludwig took place in Canada.

Finnish actors Peter Franzén and Jasper Pääkkönen, as well as Canadian actress Dianne Doan, joined the cast of the fourth season. Franzén played Norwegian King Harald Finehair, a potential rival to Ragnar. Pääkkönen was cast as Halfdan the Black, Finehair's brother. Doan portrays Yidu, a Chinese character who has a major role in the first half of the fourth season.

Former Toronto Blue Jays player Josh Donaldson is a fan of the series and in January 2016, it was announced that he would have a guest appearance in the fourth season of the show as "Hoskuld".

=== Season 5 ===
At the same time that the series was renewed for a fifth season, it was announced that Irish actor Jonathan Rhys Meyers would be joining the cast, as Heahmund, a "warrior bishop". Vikings’ creator Michael Hirst, explained: "I was looking at the history books, and I came across these warrior bishops. The antecedents of the Knights Templar: these are people who were absolutely religious, yet they put on armor and they fought. Don't let their priestly status fool you, either. 'They were crazy! They believed totally in Christianity and the message, and yet, on the battlefield, they were totally berserk.'"

WWE wrestler Adam Copeland was cast in a recurring role for the fifth season as Kjetill Flatnose, a violent and bold warrior. He is chosen by Floki to lead an expedition to Iceland to set up a colony. Irish actor Darren Cahill plays the role of Æthelred of Wessex in the fifth season. Nigerian actor Stanley Aguzie told local media he had landed a small role in the fifth season. The fifth season also features Irish actor, musician and real-life police detective, Kieran O'Reilly, who plays the role of "White Hair". In April 2017 it was announced that Danish actor Erik Madsen would join the cast for the fifth season, as King Hemmig. He spent several months of 2016 on the set of The Last Kingdom, portraying a Viking. Season 5 involved location shooting in Iceland as well as Morocco, the latter standing in for Sicily and Egypt.

=== Season 6 ===
Russian actor Danila Kozlovsky joined the series for the sixth season, as Oleg the Wise, the 10th century Varangian (east European Vikings) ruler of the Rus' people. Katheryn Winnick, who portrays Lagertha in the series, directed an episode of the season. Music for the series was contributed by Scandinavian artists with strong Nordic folk influences, including Wardruna and Danheim.

== Broadcast ==
Season	Episodes		Originally released (Canada)	
Season	Episodes		First released	Last released
1	9		March 3, 2013	April 28, 2013
2	10		February 27, 2014	May 1, 2014
3	10		February 19, 2015	April 23, 2015
4	20	10	February 18, 2016	April 21, 2016
4	20	10	November 30, 2016	February 1, 2017
5	20	10	November 29, 2017	January 24, 2018
5	20	10	November 28, 2018	January 30, 2019
6	20	10	December 4, 2019	February 5, 2020
6	20	10	January 1, 2021	March 3, 2021

Vikings premiered on March 3, 2013, in Canada and the United States. Vikings was renewed for a fourth season in March 2015 with an extended order of 20 episodes, which premiered on February 18, 2016. On March 17, 2016, History renewed Vikings for a fifth season of 20 episodes, which premiered on November 29, 2017. On September 12, 2017, ahead of its fifth-season premiere, the series was renewed for a sixth season of 20 episodes. On January 4, 2019, it was announced that the sixth season would be the series' last. The sixth season premiered on December 4, 2019. The second part of the sixth and final season was released in its entirety on December 30, 2020, on Amazon Prime Video in Ireland, the United States, the United Kingdom, Germany, and Austria; and aired in Canada on History from January 1, 2021.

In the UK, Vikings premiered on May 24, 2013, where it was exclusively available on the streaming video-on-demand service LoveFilm. The second season premiered on March 24, 2015. The third season began airing on February 20, 2015, on Amazon Prime Video.

In Australia, the series premiered on August 8, 2013, on SBS One. It was later moved to FX, which debuted the second season on February 4, 2015. Season three of Vikings began broadcasting in Australia on SBS One on March 19, 2015. Season four of Vikings began broadcasting in Australia on SBS One on February 24, 2016.

=== Editing ===
The nudity and sex scenes are regularly edited out for American audiences. For example, the sex scene between Lagertha and Astrid in the fourth-season episode "The Outsider" only showed them kissing. The scene continued for airings in other countries and on home video releases.

== Reception ==
=== Reviews ===
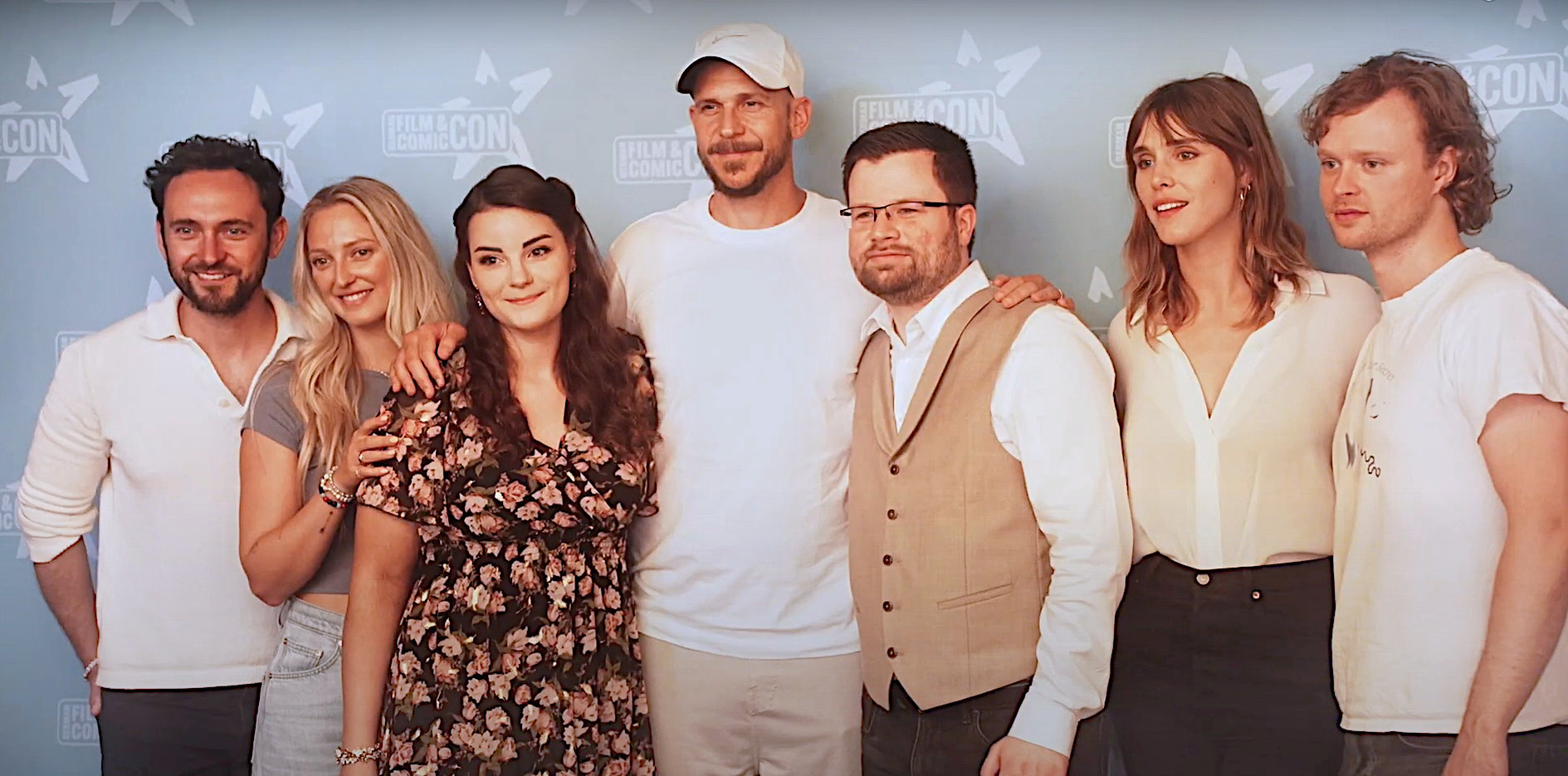
Gustaf Skarsgård (centre) and cast members at German Film & Comic Con Babelsberg, July 2024

The first episode received favorable reviews, with an average rating of 71% according to Metacritic. Alan Sepinwall of HitFix praised the casting, notably of Fimmel as Ragnar, and observed that Vikings "isn't complicated. It ... relies on the inherent appeal of the era and these characters to drive the story". Nancy DeWolf Smith of The Wall Street Journal noted the "natural and authentic" setting and costumes, and appreciated that Vikings was (unlike, for example, Spartacus) not a celebration of sex and violence, but "a study of character, stamina, power and ... of social, emotional and even intellectual awakening". Hank Stuever, writing for The Washington Post, said that the "compelling and robust new drama series ... delivers all the expected gore and blood spatter", but that it successfully adapted the skills of cable television drama, with the care taken in acting, writing and sense of scope reminiscent of Rome, Sons of Anarchy and Game of Thrones. He also suggested that the way the series emphasized "a core pride and nobility in this tribe of thugs" reflected "just another iteration of Tony Soprano". Neil Genzlinger, in The New York Times, praised the "arresting" cinematography and the actors' performances, notably Fimmel's, and favorably contrasted Vikings to Game of Thrones and Spartacus for the absence of gratuitous nudity.

In TIME, James Poniewozik noted that the relatively simple generational conflict underlying Vikings "doesn't nearly have the narrative ambition of a Game of Thrones or the political subtleties of a Rome", nor these series' skill with dialogue, but that it held up pretty well compared to the "tabloid history" of The Tudors and The Borgias. He concluded that "Vikings' larger story arc is really more about historical forces" than about its not very complex characters. Clark Collis of Entertainment Weekly appreciated the performances, but considered Vikings to be "kind of a mess", lacking the intrigue of The Tudors and Game of Thrones. Brian Lowry criticized the series in Variety as an "unrelenting cheese-fest" and as a "more simpleminded version of Game of Thrones", but considered that it had "a level of atmosphere and momentum that makes it work as a mild diversion". In the San Francisco Chronicle, David Wiegand was disappointed by the series' "glacial pace" and lack of action as well as the "flabby direction and a gassy script", while appreciating the performances and characters.

The second season received a Metacritic rating of 77%, and a Rotten Tomatoes rating of 92% based on twelve professional critic reviews.

=== Ratings ===
According to Nielsen, the series premiere drew six million viewers in the US, topping all broadcast networks among viewers aged 18 to 49. An earlier claim of over eighteen million viewers was later retracted by the channel with an apology.

In Canada, the premiere had 1.1 million viewers. The first season averaged 942,000 viewers.

== Languages ==
Most of the scenes are shot in modern English, but several other languages are featured through the series, in order to make the audience perceive that different groups of characters speak different native languages and often have troubles communicating. These include primarily Old Norse, Old English and Latin, which appeared since the first season.

The cast was helped by dialect coach Poll Moussoulides. Old Norse dialogues were translated by Erika Sigurdson (University of Iceland) and Old English ones by Kate Wiles (Leeds University). Other languages featured includes Old French (in seasons 3 and 4), Arabic (in seasons 4 and 5), Byzantine Greek and Sami (in season 5), and Old East Slavic and Miꞌkmaq (in season 6).

== Historical inaccuracies ==
In the first episode, "Rites of Passage", Floki is seen building a longship out of sequence for Viking shipmakers. The internal frames (ribs) are shown in place before the hull planking is completed. Viking longships were clinker-built using shell-first construction. The keel was shaped and the hull planks (strakes) were assembled bottom up, each overlapping the one below it, until the entire hull was completed. Only then were the internal ribs fitted to the contours of the completed hull.

Lars Walker, in the magazine The American Spectator, criticised its portrayal of early Viking Age government (represented by Earl Haraldson) as autocratic rather than essentially democratic. Joel Robert Thompson criticised depiction of the Scandinavians' supposed ignorance of the existence of Britain and Ireland and of the death penalty rather than outlawry (skoggangr) as their most serious punishment.

Monty Dobson, a historian at Central Michigan University, criticised the depiction of Viking clothing but went on to say that fictional shows like Vikings could still be a useful teaching tool. The Norwegian newspaper Aftenposten reported that the series incorrectly depicted the temple at Uppsala as a stave church in the mountains, whereas the historical temple was situated on flat land, and stave churches were characteristic of later Christian architecture. The temple in the series has similarities with reconstructions of the Uppåkra hof. Kattegat is depicted in the series as a village when in reality, it is a body of water. The Gesta Danorum records that Ragnar's royal lineage was stationed in a village called Lejre.

Many characters are based on (or inspired by) real people from history or legend and the events portrayed are broadly drawn from history. The history of more than a century has been condensed; people who could never have met are shown as of similar age, with the history amended for dramatic effect. Season one leads up to the attack on Lindisfarne Abbey of 793 (before the real Rollo was born). In season three the same characters at roughly the same ages participate in the Siege of Paris of 845. By this time, Ecbert was dead and King Æthelwulf was already on the throne. Rollo is shown having his followers killed and fighting his fellow Vikings, whereas in history they were granted what became Normandy and continued to co-operate with their Norse kinsmen.

Little is known about Viking religious practice and its depiction is largely fictitious. When Katheryn Winnick was asked why she licked the seer's hand she answered: "It wasn't originally in the script and we just wanted to come up with something unique and different". The showrunner Michael Hirst said, "I especially had to take liberties with Vikings because no one knows for sure what happened in the Dark Ages ... we want people to watch it. A historical account of the Vikings would reach hundreds, occasionally thousands, of people. Here we've got to reach millions".

In the fourth episode of the second season, the bishop of Wessex is shown inflicting crucifixion as punishment for apostasy, while it had been outlawed more than four centuries earlier by Emperor Constantine the Great, and it would have been blasphemous for the Christian population.

== Home media ==
Season	Volume(s)	DVD release date			Blu-ray release date	
Season	Volume(s)	Region 1	Region 2	Region 4	Region A	Region B
1	Season	October 15, 2013	February 3, 2014	March 26, 2014	October 15, 2013	February 3, 2014
2	Season	October 14, 2014	November 3, 2014	November 5, 2014	October 14, 2014	November 3, 2014
3	Season	October 13, 2015	November 2, 2015	October 21, 2015	October 13, 2015	October 21, 2015
4	Part 1	August 23, 2016	October 24, 2016	October 12, 2016	August 23, 2016	October 12, 2016
4	Part 2	May 2, 2017	August 7, 2017	March 29, 2017	May 2, 2017	March 29, 2016
4	Season	—N/a	August 7, 2017	—N/a	—N/a	August 7, 2017
5	Part 1	April 3, 2018	October 1, 2018	June 20, 2018	April 3, 2018	June 20, 2018
5	Part 2	April 23, 2019	October 7, 2019	May 22, 2019	April 23, 2019	May 22, 2019
5	Season	—N/a	October 7, 2019	—N/a	—N/a	October 7, 2019
6	Part 1	October 6, 2020	October 19, 2020	October 14, 2020	October 6, 2020	October 14, 2020
6	Part 2	TBA	TBA	TBA	June 15, 2021	TBA
6	Season	—N/a	TBA	—N/a	TBA	—N/a

== Related media ==
=== Comic book ===
Zenescope partnered with the History Channel to create a free Vikings comic book based on the series. It was first distributed at Comic-Con 2013 and by comiXology in February 2014. The comic was written by Michael Hirst, features interior artwork by Dennis Calero (X-Men Noir), and is set before the events of season one. In addition to featuring Ragnar and Rollo battling alongside their father, the comic depicts the brothers' first encounter with Lagertha.

=== Vikings: Athelstan's Journal (2015) ===
A web series comprising 13 webisodes known as Vikings: Athelstan's Journal, directed by Lucas Taylor and written by Sam Meikle, was released in 2015 by the History Channel.

=== Sequel series ===
On January 4, 2019, alongside the announcement that the series would end after its sixth season, it was announced that Hirst and MGM Television were developing a spin-off series with writer Jeb Stuart. On November 19, 2019, it was announced that this, titled Vikings: Valhalla, would take place a century after the end of the original series and would be released on Netflix. The 24-episode series was made by MGM Television, and filmed primarily in Ireland, working from the same Ashford Studios in County Wicklow. The series focuses "on the adventures of Leif Erikson, Freydís Eiríksdóttir and Harald Sigurdsson".
