= Lucas Taylor (screenwriter) =

Australian screenwriter and director

Lucas Taylor is an Australian screenwriter and director. He is known for the 2019 virtual reality (VR) sci-fi feature film Eleven Eleven and the 2022 Stan TV drama series Black Snow. He has won several AWGIE Awards.

== Early life and education ==
Taylor went to Pottsville Beach Primary School (NSW) where he was the dux in 1992. He attended Kingscliff High School (NSW). Lucas is an alumnus of the Griffith Film School in Brisbane, Queensland, where he graduated with a Bachelor of Film and Screen Media Production.

== Career ==
From 2012 until 2016, Taylor was creative director at Hoodlum, a film production company based in Brisbane and Los Angeles. There he undertook work which included campaigns for major films and television series.

In 2017 he was awarded the second Greg Coote Scholarship, (Note: "Supported by Screen Queensland, Australians in Film, the Queensland Writers Centre, and FremantleMedia... named for one of Australia’s most prolific industry figures. Greg Coote ran LA-based Larrikin Entertainment with David Calvert-Jones; he was a producer and financier of theatrical movies, television programs and digital entertainment content.") worth A$25,000, which enabled him to work with FremantleMedia production partners overseas, which include UFA in Germany; Wildside in Italy; Miso Film in Scandinavia; Kwai in France, and Euston Films in the UK.

Taylor wrote and directed Inside Manus, a VR documentary about asylum seekers in Manus offshore detention centre commissioned by SBS VR. In 2017 the film premiered at the Melbourne International Film Festival, screened at the Cannes Film Festival, and won the SPAA award for best interactive production.

He wrote the script for Eleven Eleven, which had its world premiere at SXSW in 2019, and was nominated for an AWGIE in the same year.

Taylor's television work includes Harrow (TV series); Vikings: Athelstan's Journal; Secrets and Lies; Texas Rising: The Lost Soldier; and The Strange Calls.

Black Snow, a six-part crime drama series filmed in North Queensland, was created by Taylor. The series took three years to produce, with the storyline based on a cold case murder in the South Sea Islander community in the fictional town of Ashford in Queensland. Travis Fimmel stars as the detective, while Jemmason Power plays the murder victim's younger sister. The cast also includes Brooke Satchwell, Alexander England, Erik Thomson, Kim Gyngell, Rob Carlton, Jimi Bani, Daniela Farinacci, Lucy Bell, Talijah Blackman-Corowa, and Eden Cassady. Ziggy Ramo collaborated with composer Jed Palmer to produce all of the music for the show, and also appears in it. The series is directed by Sian Davies, and spans two different time periods, in 1994 and 2019. After its "Blue Carpet" screening on 27 December 2022, all six episodes were released on 1 January 2023 on Stan. It screened on Sundance Now in the U.S. from 2022.

Taylor also wrote the six-part series In Limbo, starring Ryan Corr and Bob Morley, which aired on ABC Television in 2023.

== Recognition and awards ==
- 2017: Greg Coote Scholarship
- 2019: John Hinde Award for Excellence in Science-Fiction Writing at the AWGIEs, for Eleven Eleven
