= My Blind Heart =

- Film poster
- German: Mein blinders Herz
- Directed by: Peter Brunner
- Written by: Peter Brunner
- Produced by: Klara von Veegh; Therese Seemann
- Starring: Christos Haas; Jana McKinnon; Susanne Lothar; Robert Schmiedt; Georg Friedrich; Christopher Schaerf
- Cinematography: Franz Dude
- Edited by: Peter Brunner
- Production company: Cataract Vision
- Release date: January 2014
- Running time: 92 minutes
- Country: Austria
- Language: German

My Blind Heart (German title Mein blindes Herz) is an Austrian drama film written, directed and edited by Peter Brunner. The film premiered at the International Film Festival Rotterdam and Slamdance Film Festival in Park City, Utah, in January/February 2014 and was nominated for a Golden Frog at the prestigious Camerimage Film Festival in November 2014.

== Plot ==
Kurt is a 29-year-old marine biologist who suffers from the rare disease Marfan syndrome, which makes him almost blind as well as giving him a very peculiar appearance. After his dream of working at a Shark School is shattered, Kurt kills his mother, with whom he has a suffocating relationship and sets out on a journey to rebel against his body and the limits society tries to set for him. A short stay at a care home results in chaos and him getting kicked out, and he ends up on the streets where he befriends 13-year-old runaway Conny. Conny becomes his partner in crime during his protesting actions, not knowing what Kurt's motives are. Finally, Kurt manages to use a former friend from the care home, Roberto, to help him achieve his ultimate goal.

== Cast ==
- Christos Haas as Kurt
- Jana McKinnon as Conny
- Susanne Lothar as Mother
- Georg Friedrich as Paul
- Robert Schmiedt as Roberto
- Christopher Schärf as David

== Reception ==
The film was mostly well received by critics. Variety's Dennis Harvey called it "a visually arresting black-and-white debut" while Clarence Tsui of The Hollywood Reporter said that it was "boasting scintillating visuals, revolutionary ideology which charges social norms head on, and powerful performances from its cast".

== Accolades ==
Year	Award	Category	Recipient	Result
2014	Slamdance Film Festival	Jury Award for Narrative Feature	Peter Brunner	Nominated
2014	International Film Festival Rotterdam	HIVOS Tiger Award	Peter Brunner	Nominated
2014	Brooklyn Film Festival	Grand Chameleon Award	Peter Brunner	Nominated
2014	Brooklyn Film Festival	Certificates of Outstanding Achievement Cinematography	Franz Dude	Won
2014	Brooklyn Film Festival	Certificates of Outstanding Achievement Actor Male	Christos Haas	Won
2014	Andrey Tarkovsky Film Festival "Zerkalo"	Special Jury Mention	Peter Brunner	Won
2014	Durban International Film Festival	Award for Artistic Bravery	Peter Brunner	Won
2014	New Horizons Film Festival	Grand Prize	Peter Brunner	Nominated
2014	Camerimage	Golden Frog	Franz Dude	Nominated
