= Revealed (Australian documentary series) =

Australian documentary series

Promotional poster for the first documentary under the banner, Revealed: Amongst Us - Neo Nazi Australia.

Revealed is the collective name of a series of Australian documentaries and non-fiction investigative content produced by Stan, made in collaboration with the Nine Network. Each title prominently features the work of journalists and producers from Nine's other publications, including 60 Minutes, The Age, The Sydney Morning Herald, and the Australian Financial Review. The first title to release under the name was Revealed: Amongst Us – Neo Nazi Australia, which premiered on 27 March 2022. Further documentaries under the Revealed banner are scheduled for release in 2024.

== Documentaries ==
=== Amongst Us – Neo Nazi Australia ===
Hosted by investigative journalist Nick McKenzie and directed by documentarian Bentley Dean, Amongst Us – Neo Nazi Australia explores the inner-workings of extremist group National Socialist Network, and the rise of far-right terrorism in Australia. The documentary expands upon an initial special investigation produced by 60 Minutes, and was released on 27 March 2022.

=== No Mercy, No Remorse ===
Developed under the working title of The Prince of Hate, the second documentary in the series, No Mercy, No Remorse, investigates the life, crimes, and motives of Paul Denyer, an Australian serial killer who murdered three young women in the suburb of Frankston, Victoria in 1993. The documentary is directed by Terry Carlyon and presented by John Silvester, who also serves as senior crime reporter for The Age newspaper. It was developed with support from VicScreen and released on 23 June 2022.

== See also ==
- List of Stan original programming
