= Arka Das =

Australian actor

- Born: Bangladesh
- Occupation: Actor
- Years active: 2009-present
- Notable work: Pulse; Shantaram

Arka Das is an Australian actor, director, and screenwriter.

== Early life and education ==
Arka Das was born in Bangladesh and emigrated to Australia with his family as a child. He grew up in the inner-west Sydney suburb of Ashfield. He attended school and university in Sydney.

== Career ==
Das has played roles in numerous television series, including Shantaram, Pulse, Bite Club, Top of the Lake: China Girl, Safe Home and Bali 2002 He also appeared in films UnIndian (2015), the Academy Award-nominated film Lion (2016), the live-action remake of Mulan (2020), and The Portable Door (2023).

His stage credits include Beached at Sydney's Griffin Theatre and Animals Out of Paper at Sydney's Ensemble Theatre, for which he was nominated for Best Newcomer at the 2010 Sydney Theatre Awards.

Das is also a screenwriter and director, having made short films, web series, and documentaries. In 2014, he co-created comedy web series The Casuals, which was streamed in the US. His short documentary film Phoenix was a finalist at Focus on Abilities Film Festival in 2016. He then wrote and directed the short film Khana Khazana, which screened at several film festivals in Australia and overseas. It won several awards at Made in the West Film Festival 2020. It is being developed into a full-length feature film.

For his performance in 2021 anthology film Here Out West, Das was nominated for the 2023 Logie Award for Most Outstanding Supporting Actor. One of eight writers, he wrote and starred in the Brotherhood segment of the film and featured in the next chapter, The Eternal Dance. He also received a nomination for the 2021 AWGIE (Australian Writers Guild) Awards in the Original Feature Film category for the same project.

Das went on to host the ABC Television series 8 Nights Out West in 2022, where he explored different cuisines across Sydney, based on the cultural backgrounds of each of the Here Out West writers.

== Filmography ==
=== Television ===
Year	Title	Role	Notes	Ref
2026	The Airport Chaplain	Sami Rahman	TV series	
2026	The F Ward	Dr Kush Prasad	TV series: 6 episodes	
2024	Return to Paradise	Ken Sen-Jones	TV series, 1 episode	
2024	Troppo	Khalid	TV series, 3 episodes	
2024	Fake	Rohit	Miniseries, 1 episode	
2024	Colin from Accounts	Justin Shelley	TV series, 2 episodes	
2024	Prosper	Ravi	TV series, 1 episode	
2023	Utopia	Ravi	TV series, 1 episode	
2023	Safe Home	David	Miniseries, 3 episodes	
2023	We Interrupt This Broadcast	Various	TV series, 4 episodes	
2022	Shantaram	Nishant Patel	TV series, 7 episodes	
2022	Bali 2002	Dr Vij Vijayasekaran	Miniseries, 2 episodes	
2020	Rosehaven	Thomas	TV series, season 4, 1 episode	
2019	Frayed	Sonny	TV series, 1 episode	
2018	Bite Club	Depak Chaudhary	TV series, 8 episodes	
2017	Pulse	Tabb Patel	TV series, 8 episodes	
2017	Janet King	Ravi Hasan	TV series, season 3, 1 episode	
2017	Top of the Lake: China Girl	Karnick	TV series, 2 episodes	
2016	VODville		TV series, 1 episode	
2015	Hiding	Clifford George	Miniseries, 1 episode	
2014	The Code	Farid	TV series, 3 episodes	
2014	The Casuals	Samir	Web series, 8 episodes	
2012	Tricky Business	Bank Teller	TV series, 1 episode	

=== Film ===
Year	Title	Role	Notes
2024	My Melbourne	Indraneel	
2024	Maidaan	Prashanto	
2023	The Portable Door	Neville	Feature film
2022	Thor: Love and Thunder	Sycophant God	Feature film
2022	Here Out West	Robi	Anthology feature film
2020	Mulan	Red Fez	Feature film
2019	Babyteeth	Shaun	Feature film
2017	BOYZ	Kerr	Short film
2016	Overtime	Sean	Short film
2016	Lion	Sami	Feature film
2016	Joe Cinque's Consolation	Sanjeeva	Feature film
2016	Down Under	Steve	Feature film
2016	Spice Sisters	Sachin	Short film
2015	Big Bad World	Rajesh	Short film
2015	Good Morning	Nathan	
2015	Moose	Uber Driver	Short film
2015	UNindian	TK	Feature film
2015	The Annual Company Games VII	Kevin	Short film
2012	Shoebox	Tarek	Short film
2009	Jagdish Ji	Jagdish	Short film

== Stage ==
Das has performed on stage in many productions, including the following:

Year	Title	Role	Notes
2023	The Seagull	Simon	Roslyn Packer Theatre with STC
2013	Beached	The Producer	Stables Theatre, Sydney with Griffin Theatre Company
2011	Casanova	Rocco	Ensemble Theatre, Sydney
2011	Deep Suburbia	Various roles	STC / BYDS
2010	Animals Out of Paper	Suresh	Ensemble Theatre, Sydney (nominated for Best Newcomer at Sydney Theatre Awards)
2010	References to Salvador Dalí Make Me Hot	Martin	Griffin Theatre Company
	Fitting into Wageni	Byron	Apocalypse Theatre Company
	The Club	Gerry	Ashfield Youth Theatre
