= Logie Award for Most Outstanding Supporting Actor =

- Country: Australia
- Presented by: TV Week
- First award: 2016
- Currently held by: Thomas Weatherall (2023)

Highlights
- Most awards: Tim Minchin, Damon Herriman, Hazem Shammas, Frankie J. Holden, Colin Friels & Thomas Weatherall (1)
- Website: www.tvweeklogieawards.com.au

The Silver Logie for Most Outstanding Supporting Actor is an award presented annually at the Australian TV Week Logie Awards. It was first awarded at the 58th Annual TV Week Logie Awards in 2016 and is given to recognise the outstanding performance of supporting actors in an Australian program. The winner and nominees of this award are chosen by television industry juries. Tim Minchin was the first winner for his role in The Secret River.

== Winners and nominees ==
Key	Meaning
‡	Indicates the winning supporting actor

Year	Nominees	Program(s)	Network	Ref
2016	Tim Minchin‡	The Secret River	ABC	
2016	Daniel Wyllie	No Activity	Stan	
2016	David Berry	A Place to Call Home	SoHo	
2016	Ryan Corr	Banished	BBC First	
2016	Tim Minchin	No Activity	Stan	
2017	Damon Herriman‡	Secret City	Showcase	
2017	Rick Donald	800 Words	Seven Network	
2017	Ryan Johnson	Doctor Doctor	Nine Network	
2017	Ben Oxenbould	Deep Water	SBS	
2017	Matt Nable	Barracuda	ABC	
2018	Hazem Shammas‡	Safe Harbour	SBS	
2018	Aaron Pedersen	A Place To Call Home	Showcase	
2018	Alex Dimitriades	Wake in Fright	Network Ten	
2018	Anthony Hayes	Seven Types of Ambiguity	ABC	
2018	David Wenham	Romper Stomper	Stan	
2019	Frankie J. Holden‡	A Place To Call Home	Foxtel	
2019	Bernard Curry	Wentworth	Foxtel	
2019	Ewen Leslie	Fighting Season	Foxtel	
2019	Ian Meadows	Dead Lucky	SBS	
2019	Wayne Blair	Mystery Road	ABC	
2022	Colin Friels‡	Wakefield	ABC	
2022	Damon Herriman	The Tourist	Stan	
2022	Hugh Sheridan	Back to the Rafters	Amazon Prime Video	
2022	Matt Nable	Mr Inbetween	Foxtel	
2022	William McInnes	The Newsreader	ABC	
2023	Thomas Weatherall‡	Heartbreak High	Netflix	
2023	Alexander England	Black Snow	Stan	
2023	Arka Das	Here Out West	ABC	
2023	Clarence Ryan	Mystery Road: Origin	ABC	
2023	Hamish Michael	The Twelve	Binge/Foxtel	
2023	Luke Arnold	True Colours	SBS	
