= The Survivors (Australian TV series) =

2025 Australian drama miniseries

- Promotional poster
- Genre: Drama
- Created by: Tony Ayres
- Based on: The Survivors by Jane Harper
- Starring: Charlie Vickers; Yerin Ha; Robyn Malcolm; Damien Garvey; Jessica De Gouw; George Mason; Thom Green; Martin Sacks; Miriama Smith; Johnny Carr; Julian Weeks; Ian Bliss; Benedict Hardie; Lucy Bell; Catherine McClements; Don Hany
- Country of origin: Australia
- Original language: English
- No. of series: 1
- No. of episodes: 6

Production
- Executive producers: Tony Ayres; Jane Harper; Cherie Nowlan; Matt Vitins; Andrea Denholm
- Producer: Andrew Walker
- Running time: 46–53 minutes
- Production companies: Tony Ayres Productions; NBCUniversal International Studios; Matchbox Pictures

Original release
- Network: Netflix
- Release: 6 June 2025

The Survivors is an Australian drama miniseries created by Tony Ayres for Netflix. Based on Jane Harper's 2020 novel of the same name, the series was released on 6 June 2025. The series follows Kieran Elliott, a resident of the (fictional) coastal town of Evelyn Bay in Tasmania, after a deadly storm hits, and his return 15 years later with his family, to find both the community and Kieran himself still haunted by memories of the past. The series received positive reviews from critics.

== Synopsis ==
Kieran Elliott's life changed forever in his coastal home town of Evelyn Bay, Tasmania, after a severe storm hit the bay causing the deaths of three people who were close to him. When he returns home 15 years later with his own family, the past comes back to haunt him and the tight-knit community when a young woman is murdered. The community is desperate for answers and they are forced to uncover the deadly mysteries from the past.

== Cast ==
=== Main ===
- Charlie Vickers as Kieran Elliott, the only survivor of the accident in the sea caves in 2009
- Yerin Ha as Mia Chang, Kieran's girlfriend and Gabby's best friend until her disappearance on the day of the accident in the caves
- Robyn Malcolm as Verity Elliott, Kieran's mother who blames him for the death of her other son, Finn
- Damien Garvey as Brian Elliott, Kieran's father with Alzheimer's
- Jessica De Gouw as Olivia "Liv" Birch, an old friend of Kieran and sister of the missing Gabby
- George Mason as Ash Carter, Liv's boyfriend and Kieran's friend
- Thom Green as Sean Gilroy, brother of the deceased Toby and friend of Kieran
- Martin Sacks as Julian Gilroy, the father of Toby one of the deceased in the accident in the cave in 2009
- Miriama Smith as Detective Senior Sergeant Sue Pendlebury
- Johnny Carr as Detective Alex Dan
- Julian Weeks as Liam Gilroy, Toby's grieving son
- Ian Bliss as Geoff Mallott, retired police sergeant and friend of Brian, who investigated the disappearance of Gabby
- Benedict Hardie as Sergeant Chris Renn
- Lucy Bell as Andrea, Bronte's mother
- Catherine McClements as Trish Birch, the mother of Liv and the missing Gabby
- Don Hany as George Barlin, a writer friend of Bronte

=== Recurring ===
- Shannon Berry as Bronte, Liv's flatmate who investigates Gabby's disappearance
- Eloise Rothfield as Gabby Birch, Liv's sister who disappeared on the day of the storm in 2009
- Remy Kidd as Finn Elliott, Kieran's brother who dies in the accident in the caves
- Talon Hopper as Toby Gilroy, Finn's friend who dies in the accident in the caves

== Episodes ==
| No. | Title | Directed by | Written by | Original release date |
|---|---|---|---|---|
| 1 | Episode 1 | Cherie Nowlan | Tony Ayres | 6 June 2025 |
The series begins with a tragic accident in Evelyn Bay when teenager Kieran is rescued from a sea cave during a storm, but his brother Finn and friend Toby die when their boat capsizes. Years later, Kieran returns to his hometown with his partner Mia and their baby, Audrey, for the 15th-anniversary memorial. The visit is tense — his mother, Verity, blames him for the past and his father, Brian, suffers from dementia, sometimes mistaking Kieran for Finn. At a local pub, Kieran faces hostility including from Liam, Toby's grieving son. Later Bronte, a visitor researching Gabby Birch's disappearance (an unsolved case which occurred on the same day as the storm), is found dead on the beach. The police investigate, questioning Kieran and others, while tensions rise. Suspicion falls on Liam after his car is spotted near Bronte's house but Kieran also discovers that his father may have been out on the night of Bronte's death when he finds sand on his father's boots. Meanwhile, Mia learns that Bronte was digging into Gabby's case, hinting that her death may be connected to the town's dark secrets. As old wounds reopen, Kieran realizes that Evelyn Bay's tragedies are far from buried.
| 2 | Episode 2 | Cherie Nowlan | Tony Ayres & Alberto Di Troia | 6 June 2025 |
| 3 | Episode 3 | Cherie Nowlan | Chistian White | 6 June 2025 |
| 4 | Episode 4 | Ben C. Lucas | Peter Templeman | 6 June 2025 |
| 5 | Episode 5 | Ben C. Lucas | Belinda Chayko | 6 June 2025 |
| 6 | Episode 6 | Ben C. Lucas | Belinda Chayko | 6 June 2025 |
After Bronte's pictures are download from the cloud, George Barlin is identified as Bronte's stalker, but he has an alibi for the time of the murder. Amongst Bronte's pictures is one of Gabby's name carved into the caves, suggesting that she had drowned there. Kieran returns to the caves with Sean in the hopes of finding proof. Sean reveals that he had taken Gabby to the caves where he had tried to kiss her, only to be rejected. Embarrassed, Sean ran out and Gabby got lost and drowned with Julian lying to protect his son. Before they left, Sean had stored Gabby's backpack on the boat. Bronte found Gabby's carving and while trying to delete the picture, Sean killed her and framed Brian. Sean attacks Kieran, but he escapes. Having linked Sean to Bronte's camera, the police arrest him for her murder, find Gabby's body and exonerate Toby, Finn, Liam and Brian. Kieran makes amends with Mia, and they decide to stay in Evelyn Bay. At a memorial for those who died in the storm, Trish is finally able to make peace with the loss of her daughter.

== Production ==
On 21 August 2023, Netflix announced The Survivors with three other Australian television projects. The series would be produced by Tony Ayres and Matchbox Pictures, with Jane Harper serving as an executive producer. The series is based on Harper's 2020 novel of the same name. On 19 December 2023, it was announced that the series had begun primary principal photography in Tasmania and secured funding and was supported by VicScreen and Screen Tasmania.

On 31 January 2025, Netflix made an official cast announcement for the series. On 15 February 2024, it was announced that the series had begun filming in Hobart, with additional filming taking place in Melbourne's Docklands Studios.

== Release ==
On 31 January 2025, Netflix had announced the drama slate for its Australian releases with it including the series.

== Reception ==
=== Viewership ===
The series debuted at #4 most watched series on Netflix globally, and was the #2 most watched series on Netflix worldwide during its first week of release from 9 to 15 June.

=== Critical response ===
The review aggregator website Rotten Tomatoes reported a 100% approval rating based on 15 critic reviews. Reviewing the series for The Guardian, Lucy Mangan gave a rating of 4/5 and described it as "a study in how raw grief and festering resentment warp everything – and how surviving a tragedy rarely means getting away unscathed."

== Awards ==
Logie Awards
| Year | Category | Nominee | Result | Ref |
|---|---|---|---|---|
| 2026 | Best Lead Actress in a Drama | Yerin Ha | Pending | |
| 2026 | Best Supporting Actor in a Drama | Damien Garvey | Pending | |
| 2026 | Best Supporting Actress in a Drama | Catherine McClements | Pending | |
| 2026 | Best Miniseries or Telemovie | The Survivors | Pending | |
