= Porters (TV series) =

British television series

- Genre: Sitcom
- Created by: Dan Sefton
- Written by: Dan Sefton; Camilla Whitehill; Lee Coan
- Directed by: Vadim Jean
- Starring: Edward Easton; Susan Wokoma; Claudia Jessie; Rutger Hauer; Daniel Mays
- Country of origin: United Kingdom
- Original language: English
- No. of series: 2
- No. of episodes: 9

Production
- Running time: 30 minutes
- Production company: Dancing Ledge Productions

Original release
- Network: Dave
- Release: 20 September 2017 – 19 April 2019

Porters is a British television sitcom that aired on Dave from 20 September 2017 through 2019. The series is set in the fictional St. Etheldreda's hospital, and was created by former medic Dan Sefton. The series stars Edward Easton, Susan Wokoma, Claudia Jessie, Rutger Hauer and Daniel Mays. The first series of three episodes began on 20 September 2017. A second series of six episodes began airing on 14 March 2019.

== Cast and characters ==
=== Main ===
- Edward Easton as Simon Porter
- Susan Wokoma as Frankie
- Daniel Mays as Anthony De La Mer (Series 2)
- Claudia Jessie as Lucy
- Rutger Hauer as Tillman
- Sanjeev Bhaskar as Mr. Pradeep
- Sinead Keenan as Dr Batholomew (Series 2)
- Tanya Franks as Jane Bison
- Jo Joyner as Dr Kelly (Series 1)

=== Recurring ===
- James Atherton as Dr. McKenzie
- Siobhán McSweeney as Alice
- Jo Enright as Janice
- Toby Williams as Terry

=== Guest ===
- Mathew Horne as Mark
- Kelsey Grammer as Mendel
- Samantha Spiro as Rebecca
- Jamie Foreman as Alan McNally
- Christine Ozanne as Gladys
- Kiano Samuels as Lewis
- Chetan Pathak as Clinton Carrack
- Wendy Mae Brown as Mrs. Jerome
- Jonathan Hansler as Barman
- Neil Stuke as Hutch
- Ekow Quartey as Billy Tarsal
- Jacob Edwards as Dr. A Friend
- Souad Faress as Freda
- David Yip as Dalai Lama
- Sophie McShera as Pippa (Orc)
- Whitney O'Nicholas as Frankie's Sister
- Caron Pascoe as Mrs Weig
- Rich Keeble as PC Mortimer
- Marc Warren as Graham Post
- Olayinka Giwa as Policeman
- Laura Checkley as WPC Newman
- Patrick Turpin as Ham
- Scott Chambers as Cheese
- Naomi Sheldon as Nurse
- Bobby Pearse as Ten-Year-Old Simon
- Sally Lindsay as Linda (Simon's Mum)
- Sanjeev Kohli as Muzz
- Bryony Hannah as Penny
- Paul Longley as David
- Jon Glover as Howard
- Chris Wilson as Doctor
- Chiedu Agborh as Surgical Team Member

== Episodes ==
Series	Episodes	Originally released	
Series	Episodes	First released	Last released
1	3	20 September 2017	4 October 2017
2	6	14 March 2019	18 April 2019

=== Series 1 (2017) ===
No. in series	Title	Directed by	Written by	Original release date
1	"Episode One"	Vadim Jean	Dan Sefton	20 September 2017
2	"Episode Two"	Vadim Jean	Dan Sefton	27 September 2017
3	"Episode Three"	Vadim Jean	Dan Sefton	4 October 2017

=== Series 2 (2019) ===
In April 2018, it was announced that Porters had been renewed for a second series of six episodes.

No. in series	Title	Directed by	Written by	Original release date
1	"Wedding & Perfume"	Vadim Jean	Unknown	14 March 2019
2	"Orc & Pradeep"	Vadim Jean	Unknown	21 March 2019
3	"Halloween"	Vadim Jean	Camilla Whitehill	28 March 2019
4	"Ham & Cheese"	Vadim Jean	Camilla Whitehill	4 April 2019
5	"Baby Mama"	Vadim Jean	Lee Coan	11 April 2019
6	"Hospital Emergency Simulation Incident Day"	Vadim Jean	Unknown	18 April 2019
