= Bad Behaviour (memoir) =

2015 memoir by Rebecca Starford

Bad Behaviour: A Memoir of Bullying and Boarding School
- Author: Rebecca Starford
- Language: English
- Publisher: Allen & Unwin
- Publication date: 2015
- ISBN: 9781743319574

Bad Behaviour: A Memoir of Bullying and Boarding School is a 2015 memoir by Rebecca Starford describing her experiences with bullying at boarding school as a teenager. It was adapted into a four-part television drama miniseries released in 2023.

== Plot ==
Starford chronicles her experience attending a prestigious boarding school in Australia she refers to as Silver Creek. At 14, Starford spends a year living on a rugged campus in the bush and staying in Red House with 15 other girls. She is drawn to bully, Portia, and is briefly taken in by her, but ultimately rejected and bullied. Portia and some of the other girls, including Starford, bully another student, Kendall. After ten years, Starford returns to Silver Creek. In her adult life, she attempts to come to terms with her experience as a student at Silver Creek, including her mother's absence and her experiences with same-sex attraction.

== Development history ==
Starford began working on Bad Behaviour 4 or 5 years before its release. She kept a diary while attending boarding school and used this diary to write the book.

== Publication history ==
Bad Behaviour was published in 2015 by Allen & Unwin.

== Reception ==
Bad Behaviour was released to generally favourable reviews. Starford has been praised for her honesty about herself, particularly about her complicity in bullying.

== Adaptation ==
Bad Behaviour was adapted into a four-part television drama miniseries on Stan, written by Pip Karmel and Magda Wozniak and directed by Corrie Chen. It was released in 2023. The character inspired by Starford, played by Jana McKinnon, had her name changed to Jo.
