= Jana McKinnon =

Austrian-Australian actress

- Born: 1998 or 1999 (age 27–28); Korneuburg, Lower Austria, Austria
- Notable work: The Trouble with Being Born; Bad Behaviour

Jana McKinnon is an Austrian-Australian actor.

== Early life and education ==
McKinnon was born to an Austrian mother and an Australian father. She grew up in both countries, but did all her schooling in Austria.

== Career ==
McKinnon began acting as a child, mostly in European student and short films. She was cast in Kim Frank's Wach when she was 19. It was her first German movie, which required her to mask her Austrian accent. McKinnon won the New Faces Award for Best Young Actress for her performance in Wach. She played Christiane in the 2021 television remake of Wir Kinder Vom Bahnhof Zoo.

McKinnon made her Australian TV debut playing the lead role of Jo in the 2023 miniseries, Bad Behaviour, based on Rebecca Starford's memoir. She played Liv in the Amazon Prime original series, Silver and the Book of Dreams, based on Silber – Das erste Buch der Träume by Kerstin Gier. She was cast in season two of the Australian television series, Black Snow.

== Filmography ==
=== Television ===
Year	Title	Role	Notes
2019	Steirerkreuz	Anna Fürst	TV movie
2019–2021	Tatort	Luise Nathan, Zoe Hilpert	Episodes: "Die Pfalz von Oben" and "Luna Frisst oder Sterbt"
2020	Dunkelstadt	Katinka	Episode: "Schandfleck"
2021	Wir Kinder Vom Bahnhof Zoo	Christiane	Main role
2022	Die Discounter	Jana	Episode: "Herr Lewicki"
2023	Bad Behaviour	Jo Mackenzie	Main role; mini-series
2023	Silver and the Book of Dreams	Liv	Main role
2025	Black Snow	Zoe Jacobs	

=== Film ===
Year	Title	Role	Notes
2013	My Blind Heart	Conny	
2015	Beautiful Girl	Charly	
2015	Jeder der fällt hat Flügel	Kati	
2015	Wer nie sein Brot mit Tränen aß		short
2016	Liebe möglicherweise		
2016	The Impossible Picture	Johanna	
2018	To the Night	Luna	
2018	Wach	C.	
2020	The Trouble with Being Born	Elli	
2022	Servus Papa - See You in Hell	Jeanne	Main role

== Awards and nominations ==
Year	Award	Category	Work	Result	Ref.
2020	New Faces Award	besten Nachwuchsschauspielerin (Best Young Actress)	Wach	Won	
