= Here Out West =

2021 Australian anthology film

- Poster
- Directed by: Fadia Abboud; Lucy Gaffy; Julie Kalceff; Ana Kokkinos; Leah Purcell
- Written by: Nisrine Amine; Bina Bhattacharya; Matias Bolla; Claire Cao; Arka Das; Dee Dogan; Vonne Patiag; Tien Tran
- Produced by: Bree-Anne Sykes; Annabel Davis; Sheila Jayadev
- Cinematography: Tania Lambert
- Edited by: Martin Connor
- Music by: Amanda Brown
- Release date: 2021
- Running time: 100 minutes
- Country: Australia
- Languages: English; Arabic; Bengali; Cantonese; Kurdish; Tagalog; Turkish; Vietnamese; Spanish

Here Out West is a 2021 Australian anthology film set in culturally diverse Western Sydney. It is made up of eight stories from eight writers and features nine languages. The film has been praised for its positive portrayal of the diversity of Western Sydney. It was the opening film for the 68th Sydney Film Festival.

== Synopsis ==
The film consists of eight loosely connected sections, each following different characters in Western Sydney.

=== We, the Spiders ===
- Directed by Lucy Gaffy, written by Nisrine Amine

Nancy (Genevieve Lemon) is unexpectedly left to babysit her neighbour Amirah (Mia-Lore Bayeh). She visits her imprisoned daughter in the hospital where she had just given birth to a baby named Grace, and kidnaps the baby.

=== Everything Changes ===
- Directed by Ana Kokkinos, written by Matias Bolla

Jorge (Christian Ravello), a security guard in the hospital's carpark who has a fraught relationship with his son, writes poetry in Spanish while working. Nancy tries to leave the hospital with Grace, and as Jorge runs after her, his son stumbles across Jorge’s notebook, reading one of his poems.

=== Brotherhood ===
- Directed by Leah Purcell, written by Arka Das

Three friends—Dino (Thuso Lekwape), Rashid (Rahel Romahn) and Robi (Arka Das)—get into a fight. They see a man get hit by a car (driven by Nancy, who flees), and carry him to the hospital. The segment ends with Ashmita (Leah Vandenberg) approaching Robi.

=== The Eternal Dance ===
- Directed by Ana Kokkinos, written by Bina Bhattacharya

Ashmita is at the hospital visiting her dying father. He reverts to speaking only his native Bengali, so Ashmita asks Robi to interpret. Ashmita sings the song "Mama Chitte" and her father has a moment of lucidity.

=== The Musician ===
- Directed by Fadia Abboud, written by Dee Dogan

A Kurdish bağlama-maker tries to find work in Australia to support his family.

=== Brother Tom ===
- Directed by Fadia Abboud and Ana Kokkinos, written by Tien Tran

Tom returns to his old neighbourhood.

=== The Long Shift ===
- Directed by Julie Kalceff, written by Vonne Patiag

A Filipina nurse works a long shift at the hospital, during which she witnesses Nancy kidnapping the baby.

=== Closing Night ===
- Directed by Leah Purcell, written by Claire Cao

A mother and daughter work together on the closing night of their restaurant.

== Background and development ==
Each subsection of the film was written by an emerging writer, all from different backgrounds. The film includes dialogue in ten languages: Tagalog, Bengali, Arabic, Kurdish, Spanish, Turkish, Cantonese, Vietnamese, Kurmanji, and English.

The food docu-series 8 Nights Out West was inspired by the movie, hosted by Here Out West writer and actor Arka Das. Each episode features a member of the cast or crew showcasing and discussing food from their cultural background. The docu-series aired in anticipation of the launch of Here Out West on the ABC's streaming service.

== Cast ==
- Geneviève Lemon as Nancy
- Christian Ravello as Jorge
- Arka Das as Robi
- Leah Vandenberg as Ashmita
- De Lovan Zandy as Keko
- Khoi Trinh as Tuan
- Brandon Nguyen as Andy
- Christine Milo as Roxanne
- Jing Xuan Chan as Angel
- Befrin Axtjärn Jackson as Xoxe
- Mia-Lore Bayeh as Amirah
- Rahel Romahn as Rashid

== Reception ==
Tania Lambert, writing in The Conversation, considers that "the film while imperfect in that some stories are stronger than others, is a nuanced examination of race and class." The Guardian's Luke Buckmaster gave it 3 stars and concluded that "the film comes across more as a number of parts rather than the sum of them. This is a drama of modest qualities, more adept at painting pockets of time in the characters’ lives rather than self-contained (or thematically related) narratives." Wenlei Ma of news.com.au gave it 3 1/2 stars, saying "The result is a collection of stories that is genuine, moving and revealing. They have something to say about a community that’s home to millions of Australians and whose stories are often told by outsiders and without compassion."

Reviewing for The Sydney Morning Herald, Paul Byrne awards the film 4 stars finishing "It’s a clever construction, and it helps that there is only one editor, Martin Connor, keeping the tone consistent throughout." Also in The Sydney Morning Herald, Debi Enker gives it 4 1/2 stars, stating: "Getting the tone, pace and balance right on an anthology isn’t easy. This inventive and insightful production nails it."

== Awards and nominations ==
Year	Award	Category	Nominee(s)	Result	Ref.
2021	54th AWGIE Awards	Best Screenplay, Feature Film – Original	Nisrine Amine, Bina Bhattacharya, Matias Bolla, Claire Cao, Arka Das, Dee Duygu Dogan, Vonne Patiag, and Tien Tran	Nominated	
2022	12th AACTA Awards	Best Film	Here Out West – Co-curious and Emerald Productions	Nominated	
2022	12th AACTA Awards	Best Costume Design	Wendy Cork	Nominated	
2022	12th AACTA Awards	Audience Choice Award for Best Actor	Christian Ravello	Nominated	
2023	Logie Awards of 2023	Most Outstanding Supporting Actor	Arka Das	Nominated	
