= List of Vikings episodes =

Vikings is a historical drama television series written and created by Michael Hirst for the History channel. Filmed in Ireland, it premiered on March 3, 2013, in Canada. Vikings is inspired by the sagas of Viking Ragnar Lothbrok, one of the best-known legendary Norse heroes. The series portrays Ragnar's and his family's rise from farmers to nobility and fame through successful raids into Anglo-Saxon kingdoms and Francia. The series is also inspired by, and loosely adapts, various historical events from European history during the Early Middle Ages.

During the course of the series, 89 episodes of Vikings aired over six seasons, between March 3, 2013, and March 3, 2021. (Note: The second half of the sixth season concluded on December 30, 2020, when it was released in its entirety on Amazon Prime Video in select countries, ahead of its standard broadcast on History in Canada from January 1 to March 3, 2021.)

== Series overview ==
Season	Episodes		Originally released (Canada)	
Season	Episodes		First released	Last released
1	9		March 3, 2013	April 28, 2013
2	10		February 27, 2014	May 1, 2014
3	10		February 19, 2015	April 23, 2015
4	20	10	February 18, 2016	April 21, 2016
4	20	10	November 30, 2016	February 1, 2017
5	20	10	November 29, 2017	January 24, 2018
5	20	10	November 28, 2018	January 30, 2019
6	20	10	December 4, 2019	February 5, 2020
6	20	10	January 1, 2021	March 3, 2021

== Episodes ==
=== Season 1 (2013) ===
No. overall	No. in season	Title	Directed by	Written by	Original release date
1	1	"Rites of Passage"	Johan Renck	Michael Hirst	March 3, 2013
2	2	"Wrath of the Northmen"	Johan Renck	Michael Hirst	March 10, 2013
3	3	"Dispossessed"	Johan Renck	Michael Hirst	March 17, 2013
4	4	"Trial"	Ciarán Donnelly	Michael Hirst	March 24, 2013
5	5	"Raid"	Ciarán Donnelly	Michael Hirst	March 31, 2013
6	6	"Burial of the Dead"	Ciarán Donnelly	Michael Hirst	April 7, 2013
7	7	"A King's Ransom"	Ken Girotti	Michael Hirst	April 14, 2013
8	8	"Sacrifice"	Ken Girotti	Michael Hirst	April 21, 2013
9	9	"All Change"	Ken Girotti	Michael Hirst	April 28, 2013

=== Season 2 (2014) ===
No. overall	No. in season	Title	Directed by	Written by	Original release date
10	1	"Brother's War"	Ciarán Donnelly	Michael Hirst	February 27, 2014
11	2	"Invasion"	Ciarán Donnelly	Michael Hirst	March 6, 2014
12	3	"Treachery"	Ken Girotti	Michael Hirst	March 13, 2014
13	4	"Eye for an Eye"	Ken Girotti	Michael Hirst	March 20, 2014
14	5	"Answers in Blood"	Jeff Woolnough	Michael Hirst	March 27, 2014
15	6	"Unforgiven"	Jeff Woolnough	Michael Hirst	April 3, 2014
16	7	"Blood Eagle"	Kari Skogland	Michael Hirst	April 10, 2014
17	8	"Boneless"	Kari Skogland	Michael Hirst	April 17, 2014
18	9	"The Choice"	Ken Girotti	Michael Hirst	April 24, 2014
19	10	"The Lord's Prayer"	Ken Girotti	Michael Hirst	May 1, 2014

=== Season 3 (2015) ===
No. overall	No. in season	Title	Directed by	Written by	Original release date
20	1	"Mercenary"	Ken Girotti	Michael Hirst	February 19, 2015
21	2	"The Wanderer"	Ken Girotti	Michael Hirst	February 26, 2015
22	3	"Warrior's Fate"	Jeff Woolnough	Michael Hirst	March 5, 2015
23	4	"Scarred"	Jeff Woolnough	Michael Hirst	March 12, 2015
24	5	"The Usurper"	Helen Shaver	Michael Hirst	March 19, 2015
25	6	"Born Again"	Helen Shaver	Michael Hirst	March 26, 2015
26	7	"Paris"	Kelly Makin	Michael Hirst	April 2, 2015
27	8	"To the Gates!"	Kelly Makin	Michael Hirst	April 9, 2015
28	9	"Breaking Point"	Ken Girotti	Michael Hirst	April 16, 2015
29	10	"The Dead"	Ken Girotti	Michael Hirst	April 23, 2015

=== Season 4 (2016–2017) ===
No. overall	No. in season	Title	Directed by	Written by	Original release date
Part 1
30	1	"A Good Treason"	Ciarán Donnelly	Michael Hirst	February 18, 2016
31	2	"Kill the Queen"	Ciarán Donnelly	Michael Hirst	February 25, 2016
32	3	"Mercy"	Ciarán Donnelly	Michael Hirst	March 3, 2016
33	4	"Yol"	Helen Shaver	Michael Hirst	March 10, 2016
34	5	"Promised"	Helen Shaver	Michael Hirst	March 17, 2016
35	6	"What Might Have Been"	Ken Girotti	Michael Hirst	March 24, 2016
36	7	"The Profit and the Loss"	Ken Girotti	Michael Hirst	March 31, 2016
37	8	"Portage"	Ken Girotti	Michael Hirst	April 7, 2016
38	9	"Death All 'Round"	Jeff Woolnough	Michael Hirst	April 14, 2016
39	10	"The Last Ship"	Jeff Woolnough	Michael Hirst	April 21, 2016
Part 2
40	11	"The Outsider"	Daniel Grou	Michael Hirst	November 30, 2016
41	12	"The Vision"	Daniel Grou	Michael Hirst	December 7, 2016
42	13	"Two Journeys"	Sarah Harding	Michael Hirst	December 14, 2016
43	14	"In the Uncertain Hour Before the Morning"	Sarah Harding	Michael Hirst	December 21, 2016
44	15	"All His Angels"	Ciarán Donnelly	Michael Hirst	December 28, 2016
45	16	"Crossings"	Ciarán Donnelly	Michael Hirst	January 4, 2017
46	17	"The Great Army"	Jeff Woolnough	Michael Hirst	January 11, 2017
47	18	"Revenge"	Jeff Woolnough	Michael Hirst	January 18, 2017
48	19	"On the Eve"	Ben Bolt	Michael Hirst	January 25, 2017
49	20	"The Reckoning"	Ben Bolt	Michael Hirst	February 1, 2017

=== Season 5 (2017–2019) ===
No. overall	No. in season	Title	Directed by	Written by	Original release date
Part 1
50	1	"The Fisher King" (Note: The first two episodes aired together on History as a two-hour premiere, "The Departed", but were released separately on streaming services and in digital stores, with the first part titled "The Fisher King" and the second "The Departed".)	David Wellington	Michael Hirst	November 29, 2017
51	2	"The Departed"	David Wellington	Michael Hirst	November 29, 2017
52	3	"Homeland"	Steve Saint Leger	Michael Hirst	December 6, 2017
53	4	"The Plan"	Steve Saint Leger	Michael Hirst	December 13, 2017
54	5	"The Prisoner"	Ciarán Donnelly	Michael Hirst	December 20, 2017
55	6	"The Message"	Ciarán Donnelly	Michael Hirst	December 27, 2017
56	7	"Full Moon"	Jeff Woolnough	Michael Hirst	January 3, 2018
57	8	"The Joke"	Jeff Woolnough	Michael Hirst	January 10, 2018
58	9	"A Simple Story"	Daniel Grou	Michael Hirst	January 17, 2018
59	10	"Moments of Vision"	Daniel Grou	Michael Hirst	January 24, 2018
Part 2
60	11	"The Revelation"	Ciarán Donnelly	Michael Hirst	November 28, 2018
61	12	"Murder Most Foul"	Ciarán Donnelly	Michael Hirst	December 5, 2018
62	13	"A New God"	Ciarán Donnelly	Michael Hirst	December 12, 2018
63	14	"The Lost Moment"	Steve Saint Leger	Michael Hirst	December 19, 2018
64	15	"Hell"	Steve Saint Leger	Michael Hirst	December 26, 2018
65	16	"The Buddha"	Steve Saint Leger	Michael Hirst	January 2, 2019
66	17	"The Most Terrible Thing"	Helen Shaver	Michael Hirst	January 9, 2019
67	18	"Baldur"	Helen Shaver	Michael Hirst	January 16, 2019
68	19	"What Happens in the Cave"	David Wellington	Michael Hirst	January 23, 2019
69	20	"Ragnarok"	David Wellington	Michael Hirst	January 30, 2019

=== Season 6 (2019–2021) ===
No. overall	No. in season	Title	Directed by	Written by	Original release date
Part 1
70	1	"New Beginnings"	Steve Saint Leger	Michael Hirst	December 4, 2019
71	2	"The Prophet"	Steve Saint Leger	Michael Hirst	December 4, 2019
72	3	"Ghosts, Gods and Running Dogs"	Steve Saint Leger	Michael Hirst	December 11, 2019
73	4	"All the Prisoners"	David Frazee	Michael Hirst	December 18, 2019
74	5	"The Key"	David Frazee	Michael Hirst	January 1, 2020
75	6	"Death and the Serpent"	David Frazee	Michael Hirst	January 8, 2020
76	7	"The Ice Maiden"	Steve Saint Leger	Michael Hirst	January 15, 2020
77	8	"Valhalla Can Wait"	Katheryn Winnick	Michael Hirst	January 22, 2020
78	9	"Resurrection"	Daniel Grou	Michael Hirst	January 29, 2020
79	10	"The Best Laid Plans"	Daniel Grou	Michael Hirst	February 5, 2020
Part 2
80	11	"King of Kings"	Daniel Grou	Michael Hirst	January 1, 2021
81	12	"All Change"	David Frazee	Michael Hirst	January 6, 2021
82	13	"The Signal"	David Frazee	Michael Hirst	January 13, 2021
83	14	"Lost Souls"	Helen Shaver	Michael Hirst	January 20, 2021
84	15	"All at Sea"	Helen Shaver	Michael Hirst	January 27, 2021
85	16	"The Final Straw"	Paddy Breathnach	Michael Hirst	February 3, 2021
86	17	"The Raft of Medusa"	Paddy Breathnach	Michael Hirst	February 10, 2021
87	18	"It's Only Magic"	Steve Saint Leger	Michael Hirst	February 17, 2021
88	19	"The Lord Giveth..."	Steve Saint Leger	Michael Hirst	February 24, 2021
89	20	"The Last Act"	Steve Saint Leger	Michael Hirst	March 3, 2021

== Specials ==
=== Athelstan's Journal ===
A series of 13 webisodes known as Vikings: Athelstan's Journal, directed by Lucas Taylor and written by Sam Meikle, was released by the History Channel. Each webisode serves as a journal entry for the Vikings character Athelstan. The webisodes were released prior to and in conjunction with the beginning of the third season of Vikings. As of June 2023 available on YouTube, the webisodes have a running time of 1:45 to 5:01 minutes.

No.	Title	Directed by	Written by	Original release date
Athelstan's Journal
1	"Chapter One: Gods"	Lucas Taylor	Sam Meikle	January 30, 2015
2	"Chapter Two: Honor"	Lucas Taylor	Sam Meikle	February 1, 2015
3	"Chapter Three: Loyalty"	Lucas Taylor	Sam Meikle	February 6, 2015
4	"Chapter Four: Sin"	Lucas Taylor	Sam Meikle	February 8, 2015
5	"Chapter Five: Blood"	Lucas Taylor	Sam Meikle	February 13, 2015
6	"Chapter Six: Family"	Lucas Taylor	Sam Meikle	February 14, 2015
7	"Chapter Seven: Savagery"	Lucas Taylor	Sam Meikle	February 18, 2015
8	"Chapter Eight: Gods & Men"	Lucas Taylor	Sam Meikle	February 19, 2015
Stones and Bones
9	"Chapter One: Vows"	Lucas Taylor	Sam Meikle	February 20, 2015
10	"Chapter Two: Death"	Lucas Taylor	Sam Meikle	February 27, 2015
11	"Chapter Three: Love"	Lucas Taylor	Sam Meikle	March 6, 2015
12	"Chapter Four: Harvest"	Lucas Taylor	Sam Meikle	March 13, 2015
13	"Chapter Five: The Choice"	Lucas Taylor	Sam Meikle	March 20, 2015

=== Saga recaps ===
No.	Title	Directed by	Written by	Original release date
1	"The Saga of Ragnar Lothbrok"	Joshua Zimmerman	Justin Pollard	November 30, 2016
A recap of seasons 1–4, part 1 which aired before season 4, part 2. The cast and Michael Hirst discuss the remaining episodes of season 4.
2	"The Saga of Lagertha"	Joshua Zimmerman	Justin Pollard	November 29, 2017
A recap of seasons 1–4 which aired before season 5. The Seer narrates the story of Lagertha to Ivar. The cast and Michael Hirst discuss season 5, part 1.
3	"The Saga of Bjorn"	Joshua Zimmerman	Justin Pollard	November 28, 2018
A recap of seasons 1–5, part 1 which aired before season 5, part 2. Torvi narrates the story of Bjorn to their son Hali. The cast and Michael Hirst discuss the remaining episodes of season 5.
4	"The Saga of Floki"	Karla Braun	Justin Pollard	December 4, 2019
A recap of Floki's arc from the first five seasons with Ivar narrating the story to Vigrid. Alex Høgh Andersen, Jordan Patrick Smith, Georgia Hirst, Peter Franzén, Marco Ilsø and Michael Hirst discussed the first half of the final season.
5	"The Saga of the Vikings"	Joshua Zimmerman	Justin Pollard	June 5, 2021
A recap where Bjorn reunited with his brothers Ivar and Hvitserk for a strange gathering after Bjorn is gravely injured in battle. As they share tales of the exploits of their people and prophecies of Ragnarök, it becomes clear this is not a simple reunion.

== See also ==
- Vikings: Valhalla § Episodes
