= Plonk (TV series) =

- Genre: Comedy
- Created by: Nathan Earl; Glen Condie
- Written by: Nathan Earl; Joshua Tyler
- Directed by: Nathan Earl
- Country of origin: Australia
- Original language: English
- No. of seasons: 2
- No. of episodes: 9

Production
- Executive producer: Glen Condie
- Producer: Nathan Earl
- Running time: 30 minutes

Original release
- Network: Eleven (season 1); Stan (season 2)
- Release: 11 March 2014 – 1 June 2015

Plonk is an Australian comedy television series. Originally filmed as five online webisodes, they were re-edited to produce the first season of three broadcast episodes which aired on Eleven from 11 March 2014 to 25 March 2014. A second season of six half-hour episodes premiered on streaming service Stan in June 2015.

The satirical series follows the trials and tribulations of a television crew as they try to produce an engaging wine program. It stars Chris Taylor from The Chaser, Joshua Tyler and Nathan Earl playing fictional versions of themselves.

== Cast ==
=== Main ===
- Chris Taylor as Chris
- Joshua Tyler as Joshua/Josh
- Nathan Earl as Nathan/Nath

=== Guest ===
- Andrew Hansen as Self
- Dan Ilic as Self
- Greg Eccleston as Doctor Monotone
- Greg Fleet as Jester
- Jay Weatherill
- Kristian Schmid as Tristan Keen
- Maggie Beer
- Matt Moran as Self
- Matt Skinner
- Renee Lim as Lucy
- Steve Bisley as Ian Tyler
- Stuart MacGill as Self
- Susie Porter as Evelyn Tyler
- Veronica Milsom as Mariana the Backpacker / Mariana the Bootlegger
- Zindzi Okenyo as Hip Blogger

== Episodes ==
=== Season 1 ===
- Episode 1: Murrumbateman
- Episode 2: Hunter Valley
- Episode 3: Hunter Valley to Mudgee
- Episode 4: Mudgee
- Episode 5: Orange

=== Season 2 ===
- Episode 1: Adelaide Hills
- Episode 2: Clare to Barossa
- Episode 3: Barossa
- Episode 4: McLaren Vale
- Episode 5: Coonawarra
- Episode 6: Adelaide

== See also ==
- List of Stan original programming
