= Kill Your Darlings (magazine) =

Australian online literary magazine

- Categories: Literary magazine
- Founder: Rebecca Starford, Hannah Kent, Jo Case
- First issue: March 2010
- Country: Australia
- Based in: Melbourne
- Language: English
- Website: www.killyourdarlings.com.au
- ISSN: 1837-638X
- OCLC: 472605950

Kill Your Darlings (KYD) is an Australian online literary magazine dedicated to arts and culture based in Melbourne. Established in March 2010, the magazine publishes new fiction and commentary, memoir, interviews and reviews. The publishing director is Rebecca Starford, and the editor is Suzy Garcia.

== History ==
Kill Your Darlings was established in March 2010, supported by funding from the Australia Council. Founding editors Rebecca Starford and Hannah Kent set out to create a new kind of print literary journal, with a mission of "reinvigorating and re-energising this medium – to shake it up, if you like, and publish literature that bites back". The magazine name comes from a quote regularly attributed to the American novelist William Faulkner: "In writing, you must kill all your darlings".

The first issue was positively received.

In 2017, after 29 issues,KYD ceased publishing its flagship quarterly print magazine in order to focus on its growing online publishing program.

In 2019 KYD began publishing a yearly print collection of short stories titled New Australian Fiction. The 2019 and 2020 editions were both well received. The Age/Sydney Morning Herald'' described the 2019 edition as "a consistently high-quality collection", and said of the 2020 edition: "At a clutch moment in Australian publishing, the volume certainly has its finger on the pulse".

== Description and governance ==
The publishing director is Rebecca Starford, and the editor is Suzy Garcia.

KYD contributors have included Benjamin Law, Clementine Ford, Jane Caro, Ron Rash, Antony Loewenstein, Chris Womersley, Rebecca Shaw, Gideon Haigh, Krissy Kneen, Nayuka Gorrie, Ellena Savage, Maria Turmarkin, Jennifer Down, Omar Musa, Toni Jordan, Jack Cowell, Melanie Joosten, and Jon Bauer.

KYD produces a podcast, provides professional writing services such as online workshops, mentorships, and manuscript assessments, and hosts literary events.

== Awards ==
Until 2020, the KYD Unpublished Manuscript Award was awarded annually.

KYD offers several writing awards:

- Creative Non-Fiction Essay Prize (A$2500 cash prize)
- School Writing Prize (A$500)
- Poetry Prize, established in 2026 (A$2,000)

It is also a partner journal for the Desperate Literature Short Fiction Prize, with winners earning a writers' residency in Italy, manuscript assessments, and cash prizes.
