= Rebecca Starford =

Australian writer

- Born: Melbourne, Australia
- Website: www.rebeccastarford.com

Rebecca Starford is an Australian author known for her memoir, Bad Behaviour. She is the co-founder of the literary journal Kill Your Darlings. Starford's debut novel, The Imitator, was published in 2021.

== Early life and education ==
Starford was born in Melbourne and grew up in Williamstown. She attended Williamstown Primary School. As chronicled in her memoir, Starford lived in the bush for a year when she was 14 while attending an elite boarding school in Victoria.

== Career ==
Starford co-founded the literary journal Kill Your Darlings with Hannah Kent. Kill Your Darlings' first edition was published in 2010.

Starford's first book, a memoir titled, Bad Behaviour, was published in 2015 to generally favourable reviews. Bad Behaviour was adapted into a miniseries of the same name in 2023, directed by Corrie Chen and starring Jana McKinnon as Starford's character.

In 2021, Starford's first novel, The Imitator, was published by Allen & Unwin. The novel was published under the title, An Unlikely Spy, in the United States.

Starford teaches at the University of Queensland.

== Personal life ==
Starford lives with her partner in Brisbane.

== Works ==
- Bad Behaviour: A Memoir of Bullying and Boarding School (2015)
- The Imitator (2021, also published as An Unlikely Spy)
