= Claudia Jessie =

British actress and singer (born 1989)

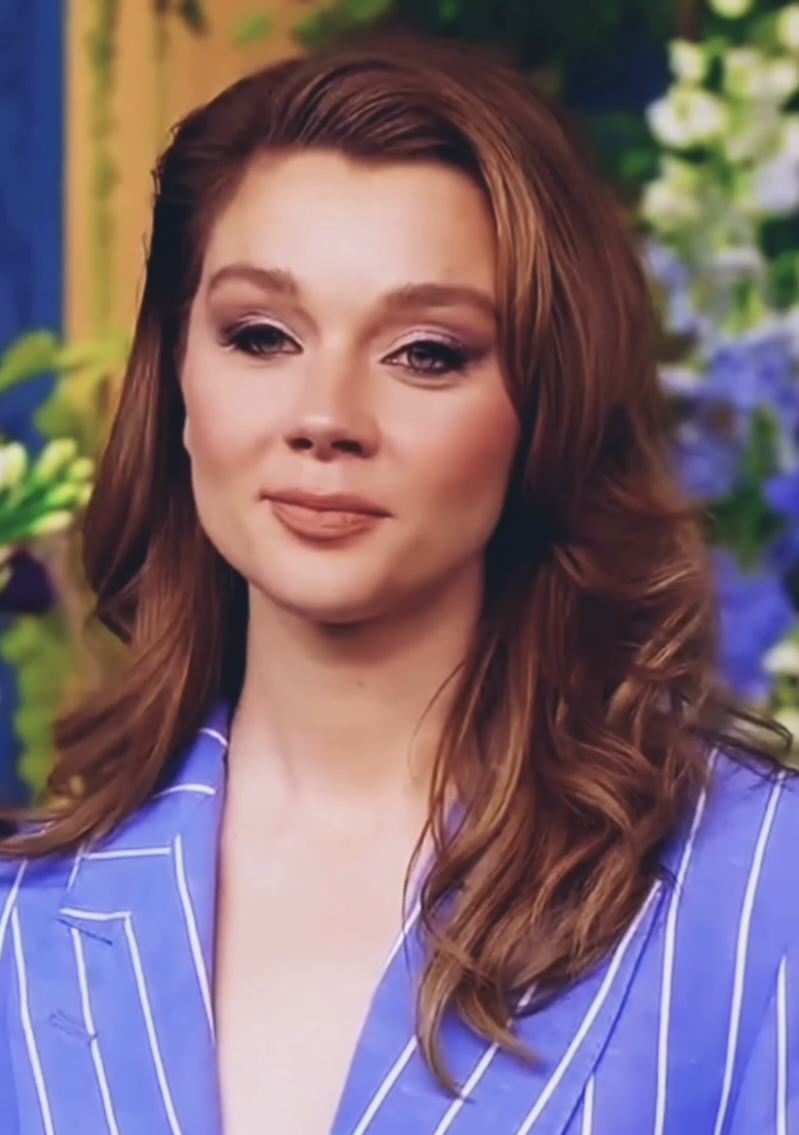
- Jessie in 2024
- Born: Claudia Jessie Peyton; 30 October 1989 (age 37); Moseley, Birmingham, England
- Occupation: Actress
- Years active: 2012–present
- Partner: Cole Edwards

Claudia Jessie Peyton (born 30 October 1989), known professionally as Claudia Jessie, is a British actress. She is best known for her role as Eloise Bridgerton in the Netflix period drama Bridgerton (2020–present). She previously appeared in the third series of the BBC One police procedural WPC 56 (2015), series 4 of Line of Duty (2017), the Dave sitcom Porters (2017–2019) and the ITV miniseries Vanity Fair (2018).

== Early life ==
Claudia Jessie Peyton was born in Moseley, and grew up on a canal boat. She spent some of her childhood on a council estate in North London and was homeschooled from the age of 14 before returning to Birmingham when she was 17. Her family struggled financially; Jessie described the experiences that came with it, such as bailiffs coming to the door, as traumatic. In addition, her parents split and her father was not around. Her single mother, Dawn, worked cleaning houses to provide for her and her brother.

Jessie's mother worked to afford her ballet lessons at the Challis School of Dance. She was subsequently discovered by student director Hannah Phillips who cast her in several amateur productions. Jessie trained part-time at the Susi Earnshaw Theatre School and spent a year studying with the Birmingham Library Theatre Company. From age 17, she worked odd jobs on the side, including in bars, as a dog walker, and for the radio station Capital FM. She signed with an agent in 2012.

== Career ==
=== 2012–2016: Early work ===
Jessie's first professional acting role was in a short film titled Rosie in 2012. She followed this with appearances in the soap operas Doctors and Casualty. She appeared in an episode of House of Anubis and reprised her role as Sophie Danae in the television film Touchstone of Ra. Between 2014 and 2016, Jessie starred in the BAFTA-winning CBBC Online web series Dixi as Shari.

In 2015, Jessie was cast as WPC Annie Taylor, the lead character in the third series of the BBC One television programme WPC 56. She was a guest in Josh, playing the protagonist's love interest. Jessie acted in the 2014 short film Copy That directed by Kingsley Hoskins which won the Best Comedic Short Film award at TSFA in New York. Jessie made her feature film debut as Doris in the 2016 war film Their Finest.

=== 2017–present: Rising popularity and breakthrough ===
In 2017, Jessie starred as DC Jodie Taylor in series four of Line of Duty on BBC One and Lucy in the Dave sitcom Porters, the latter of which she would return to for its second series. The following year, she played Amelia Sedley in the ITV miniseries adaptation of William Makepeace Thackeray's Vanity Fair. She also made a guest appearance in the Doctor Who episode "Kerblam!" in 2018.

In 2020, Jessie began playing Eloise, the fifth Bridgerton child, in the Shondaland-produced Netflix period drama Bridgerton, an adaptation of the Regency romance novels by Julia Quinn. Jessie appeared in Bali 2002 for Stan and 9Network, an Australian drama about the real life 2002 Bali bombings. Jessie portrayed real-life survivor Polly Miller, a newlywed British tourist. For her performance, Jessie was nominated for the Logie Award for Most Outstanding Actress. In 2023, Jessie narrated the audiobook The Rebound by Leeanne Slade for Audible Original. It was voted as one of Audible's best books of 2023. In 2025, she played the main role of Maggie Mahon in the Netflix series Toxic Town.

== Personal life ==
Jessie is in a relationship with casting director and editor Cole Edwards, whom she met at her Bridgerton audition. As of 2024, the couple share a flat in the Jewellery Quarter of Birmingham and have a staffy. Jessie also owns a houseboat.

Jessie is a vegan and meditates for at least an hour a day. Her aunt introduced her to Nichiren Buddhism with SGI (Soka Gakkai International) and Jessie has regularly practised it since she was 17 for her mental health. She has spoken of her experiences with panic attacks and anxiety since childhood, as well as depersonalisation disorder.

Jessie is a member of the climate activist group Extinction Rebellion and considers herself a fan of George Monbiot. She does not use social media.

== Filmography ==
=== Film ===
Year	Title	Role(s)	Note	Ref.
2012	Rosie	Rosie	Short films	
2014	Copy That	Beth	Short films	
2016	Their Finest	Doris Cleavely/Lily Starling	Also a song performer for "They Can't Black Out the Moon" with Stephanie Hyam and Rachel Portman	
2020	Night and Day	Freya	Short films	
2024	Booty	Jane	Short films	
TBA	Wegwerf	Young Joyce	Short films	

=== Television ===
Year	Title	Role(s)	Note(s)	Ref.
2012–2014	Doctors	Poppy Conroy/Kate Marshall	13 episodes	
2013	House of Anubis	Sophia Danae	2 episodes	
2013	The Paradise	Mrs Douglas	Episode: "Episode #2.8"	
2013	Casualty	Jenny Anover	Episode: "Crush Syndrome"	
2013	Anubis Unlocked	Herself	Episode: "The Touchstone of Ra"	
2014–2016	Dixi	Shari	Main role (100 episodes)	
2015	WPC 56	WPC Annie Taylor	Series 3 (5 episodes)	
2015	Jonathan Strange & Mr Norrell	Mary	Miniseries (4 episodes)	
2015	Josh	Lucy	Episode: "Suited and Booted"	
2015	Bull	Faye	Miniseries; 3 episodes only	
2016	Call the Midwife	Jeanette Su	Episode: "Episode #5.3"	
2017	Father Brown	Joan Vanderlande	Episode: "The Labyrinth of the Minotaur"	
2017	Carters Get Rich	Charity Worker	Episode: "Bad Press"	
2017	Line of Duty	Detective Constable Jodie Taylor	Series 4 (6 episodes)	
2017	Detectorists	Doctor Hoffman	Episode: "Episode #3.2"	
2017	Comedy Blaps	Danielle	Episode: "Furious Andrew"	
2017–2019	Porters	Lucy	9 episodes	
2018	Lovesick	Tasha	Episode: "Tasha"	
2018	Vanity Fair	Amelia Sedley	Miniseries (7 episodes)	
2018	Doctor Who	Kira Arlo	Episode: "Kerblam!"	
2018–2019	Defending the Guilty	Nessa	Recurring role (5 episodes)	
2020–2026	Bridgerton	Eloise Bridgerton	Main role (32 episodes)	
2022	Bali 2002	Polly Miller	Miniseries (4 episodes)	
2022	Toxic Town	Maggie Mahon	Miniseries (4 episodes)	
2026-present	Up to No Good	Hannah	Main role	

=== Music video ===
Song	Year	Artist	Notes
"Under the Tree"	2024	Ed Sheeran	

=== Audiobooks ===
Year	Title	Role	Note	Ref.
2017	Tolkien in Love	Edith	Radio 4 Drama	
2023	The Rebound	Kitty Harris	Audible Originals	
2025	The Waitress	Narrator	Audible Originals	
2025	This Christmas	Kitty Harris	Audible Originals	

== Award nominations ==
Year	Award	Category	Work	Result	Ref.
2015	British Soap Awards	Best Storyline	Doctors	Nominated	
2021	Actor Awards	Outstanding Performance by an Ensemble in a Drama Series	Bridgerton	Nominated	
2025	Actor Awards	Outstanding Performance by an Ensemble in a Drama Series	Bridgerton	Nominated	
2023	Logie Awards	Most Outstanding Actress	Bali 2002	Nominated	
