= To the Night =

2018 drama film directed by Peter Brunner

- Film poster
- Directed by: Peter Brunner
- Written by: Peter Brunner
- Starring: Caleb Landry Jones; Eleonore Hendricks; Jana McKinnon; Christos Haas; Abbey Lee
- Cinematography: Daniel Katz
- Edited by: Peter Brunner
- Release date: 2018
- Running time: 102 minutes
- Language: English

To the Night is a 2018 drama film written and directed by Austrian filmmaker Peter Brunner. It stars Caleb Landry Jones, Eleonore Hendricks, Jana McKinnon, Christos Haas, and Abbey Lee. The film follows a traumatised artist and father struggling with the psychological aftermath of a fire that killed his parents. The film premiered at the 53rd Karlovy Vary International Film Festival.

== Premise ==
Haunted by a childhood fire that killed his parents, Norman—an artist living in New York—struggles with trauma that affects his girlfriend and infant son.

== Cast ==
- Caleb Landry Jones as Norman
- Eleonore Hendricks as Penelope: Norman's girlfriend
- Jana McKinnon as Luna
- Christos Haas as Andi
- Abbey Lee as Caty

== Production and release ==
The film was written and directed by Austrian filmmaker Peter Brunner. He also edited the film. Principal photography took place in New York City between September and October 2016. Filmmaker Michael Haneke consulted on the film. It served as Brunner's English-language debut. The cinematographer was Daniel Katz. To the Night premiered in competition for the Crystal Globe at the Karlovy Vary International Film Festival in 2018.

== Reception ==
Boyd van Hoeij of The Hollywood Reporter praised Jones's performance but wondered if many viewers would be interested in following "such a downbeat and often negative character for the span of an entire feature". David Ehrlich gave it a generally negative review in IndieWire, writing that the main character's "feeble backstory isn't enough to sustain him for 102 minutes". Nick Allen of The Film Stage gave it a B grade, commending Jones's performance as "excellently unhinged". Marina Pavido of Cinema Austriaco and Nick Mastrini of Cineuropa both gave the film positive reviews.
