= Jo Case =

Australian writer

Jo Case is a writer and editor based in Adelaide, Australia. She was born in South Australia in 1975.

== Career ==
Case has served as senior writer and editor at the Wheeler Centre, an institution dedicated to the discussion and practice of writing and ideas, Program Manager of Melbourne Writers Festival (2015 and 2016), and as Books Editor for The Big Issue (Australia).

Case's first book, Boomer and Me: A memoir of motherhood, and Asperger’s was published by Hardie Grant in Australia in April 2013, and in the United Kingdom in May 2013. She is a founding member of the editorial team of Kill Your Darlings, an Australian literary journal. Case writes about the process of writing a memoir on her blog.

Case's short story "Hell is Other Parents," originally published in The Sleepers Almanac, was selected for The Best Australian Stories 2009, edited by Delia Falconer.

== Bibliography ==
=== Memoirs ===
- Case, Jo (2013). Boomer & me : a memoir of motherhood and Asperger's. Richmond, Vic.: Hardie Grant Books.

=== Short fiction ===
Title	Year	First published	Reprinted/collected	Notes
Hell is other parents	2009	The Sleepers Almanac 5	Falconer, Delia (ed.). The Best Australian Stories 2009. Black Inc.	
Something Wild	2015	The Big Issue, August 2015	Lohrey, Amanda (ed.). The Best Australian Stories 2015. Black Inc.	

=== Selected book reviews ===
Year	Review article	Work(s) reviewed
2014	Case, Jo (September 2014). "Bearing witness". Australian Book Review. 364: 13.	Hartnett, Sonya. Golden Boys. Penguin.
