= Slander (TV series) =

- Genre: Legal drama
- Created by: Marieke Hardy; Rachel Griffiths
- Directed by: Anne Renton
- Starring: Rachel Griffiths; Jessica De Gouw; Max Beesley; Roxie Mohebbi; David Berry; Doris Younane; Lincoln Younes
- Country of origin: Australia
- Original language: English

Production
- Production company: Blackfella Films

Original release
- Network: Stan

Slander is an upcoming Australian television legal drama series for Stan that is expected to premiere in 2027. The series is created by Marieke Hardy & Rachel Griffiths whom will also star and produced by Blackfella Films.

== Premise ==
The series follows Adelaide Craig, a defamation lawyer. After a successful career in London, she moves back to Australia to establish women-led defamation chambers. Teaming up with solicitor Jasmine Maloney and junior lawyer Leila Badim, the trio shakes up the tight-knit legal world with their bold tactics and no-nonsense approach.

== Cast ==
The series cast were announced on 17 September 2026.

- Rachel Griffiths as Adelaide Craig
- Jessica De Gouw as Jasmine Maloney
- Max Beesley
- Roxie Mohebbi as Leila Badim
- David Berry
- Doris Younane
- Lincoln Younes
