= Talijah Blackman-Corowa =

Australian actor

Talijah Blackman-Corowa (April 6, 2001) is Australian actor. She is best known for her role in Black Snow.

== Biography ==
Blackman-Corowa is a Toolooa woman from the Gurang Nation and of South Sea Islander heritage. She was born in Rockhampton, Central Queensland, and regularly visited family in Far North Queensland. Her parents and grandparents taught her about her South Sea Islander heritage. Her great-grandfather was from Vanuatu and was brought to Australia as a child during the era of blackbirding, having been lured onto a ship with candy at around age five. She has two older and two younger brothers.

Blackman-Corowa studied for her Bachelor of Creative Arts in Film and Television at JMC Academy. After graduating, she starred in the first series of Black Snow.

== Filmography ==
=== Television ===
Year	Title	Role	Notes
2023	Black Snow	Isabel Baker	Main role, series 1
2024	Plum	Ainslee	
2026	Deadloch	Alira	2 episodes, series 2

=== Film ===
Year	Title	Role	Notes
2012	Mabo	Malita Mabo (uncredited)	
