= Black Snow (TV series) =

2023 Australian crime drama television series

- Genre: Crime drama
- Created by: Lucas Taylor
- Written by: Lucas Taylor; Beatrix Christian; Boyd Quakawoot
- Directed by: Sian Davies; Matthew Saville; Helena Brooks
- Starring: Travis Fimmel; Jemmason Power; Talijah Blackman-Corow
- Country of origin: Australia
- Original language: English
- No. of seasons: 2
- No. of episodes: 12

Production
- Executive producers: Rosemary Blight; Ben Grant; Kylie du Fresne; Cailah Scobie; Amanda Duthie; Travis Fimmel
- Producers: Rosemary Blight; Lois Randall; Kaylene Butler; Milly Olrog
- Cinematography: Eric Murray Lui; Mark Wareham; Katie Milwright
- Camera setup: Multi-camera
- Running time: 52 minutes
- Production company: Goalpost Pictures

Original release
- Network: Stan
- Release: 1 January 2023 – present

Black Snow is an Australian crime drama television series created by Lucas Taylor for Stan. The series is set in and filmed throughout different locations in Queensland, Australia. Each season follows a different cold case being investigated by Detective James Cormack as he struggles with his own family demons. The first season premiered on 1 January 2023 on Stan and the second season premiered on 1 January 2025. On 5 March 2026, it was renewed for a third season. The third season was confirmed to air in 2027.

== Synopsis ==
Season one introduces Detective James Cormack in 2019. Cormack is placed in charge of an inquiry into the cold case murder of 17-year-old Isabel Baker in 1994 in the fictional town of Ashford. A majority of the season focuses on the Australian South Sea Islander community Isabel was a part of.

Season two, subtitled "Jack of Clubs" and set in 2024, focuses on Detective Cormack investigating the missing persons case of Zoe Jacobs in 2003 in the fictional town of Moorevale. Cormack is simultaneously informally looking into the disappearance of his younger brother in 1994.

== Cast and characters ==
=== Main ===
- Travis Fimmel as Detective James Cormack

=== Series 1 ===
- Jemmason Power as Hazel Baker
- Talijah Blackman-Corowa as Isabel Baker
- Seini Willett as Glenda Baker
- Eden Cassady as Kalana Baker
- Gulliver McGrath as Constable Dale Quinn
- Brooke Satchwell as Chloe Walcott
- Annabel Wolfe as Young Chloe Walcott
- Jimi Bani as Joe Baker
- Fraser Anderson as Young Hector Ford
- Josh Macqueen as Young Anton Bianchi
- Erik Thomson as Steve Walcott
- Lisa Blackman as Aunty Rosa
- Kim Gyngell as Sergeant Troy Turner
- Rob Carlton as Victor Bianchi
- Alexander England as Anton Bianchi
- Ava Carmont as Young Tasha Hopkins
- Kestie Morassi as Tasha Hopkins
- Daniela Farinacci as Katherine Bianchi
- Ziggy Ramo as Ezekiel Iesul

=== Series 2 (Jack of Clubs) ===
- Jana McKinnon as Zoe Jacobs
- Dan Spielman as Leo Jacobs
- Megan Smart & Alana Mansour as Samara Kahlil
- Kat Stewart as Julie Cosgrove
- Victoria Haralabidou as Nadja Jacobs
- Ella Scott Lynch as Dr. Nina Hirsch
- Frederick Du Rietz & Benedict Samuel as Sean Cosgrove
- Paula Nazarski as Val
- Vinnie Bennett as Joseph Rua
- George Mason as Ritchie Cormack (S2 & 3)

=== Series 3 (Brothers Keeper) ===
- Rose Riley as Jade
- Lee Tiger Halley
- Aaron Jeffery as Steven Knox
- Caroline Craig
- Samson Alston
- Matthew Knight

== Episodes ==
Series	Episodes	Originally released	
Series	Episodes	First released	Last released
1	6	1 January 2023	1 January 2023
2	6	1 January 2025	29 January 2025

=== Series 1 (2023) ===
No. overall	No. in series	Title	Directed by	Written by	Original release date
1	1	"Unfinished Business"	Sian Davies	Lucas Taylor	1 January 2023
2	2	"Predators"	Sian Davies	Beatrix Christian	1 January 2023
3	3	"Ezekiel"	Sian Davies	Lucas Taylor	1 January 2023
4	4	"The Lost Boys"	Matthew Saville	Boyd Quakawoot	1 January 2023
5	5	"Sugar Sugar"	Matthew Saville	Beatrix Christian	1 January 2023
6	6	"Spirits Speak"	Matthew Saville	Lucas Taylor	1 January 2023

=== Series 2: Jack of Clubs (2025) ===
No. overall	No. in series	Title	Directed by	Written by	Original release date
7	1	"Running"	Sian Davies	Lucas Taylor	1 January 2025
8	2	"Hope"	Sian Davies	Lucas Taylor	1 January 2025
9	3	"Ghost"	Sian Davies	Beatrix Christian	8 January 2025
10	4	"Control"	Helena Brooks	Huna Amweero & Lucas Taylor	15 January 2025
11	5	"Money"	Helena Brooks	Lucas Taylor	22 January 2025
12	6	"Sapphire"	Travis Fimmel	Lucas Taylor	29 January 2025

== Production ==
The first series of Black Snow was made in 2022 and directed by Matthew Saville and Sian Davies. It was written by Lucas Taylor, Boyd Quakawoot, and Beatrix Christian The first season was filmed in and around Proserpine, Queensland. Ziggy Ramo made his acting debut in the first season produced the music for the series alongside along with Jed Palmer.

On 9 April 2024, Black Snow began production for its second season, which was filmed in and around the Glass House Mountains in Queensland. Fimmel serves as an executive producer for the second season and confirmed that production had wrapped on 11 November 2024.

On 5 March 2026, the series was renewed for a third season. The third season takes place in Far North Queensland.

== Release ==
Black Snow was released on Australian streaming service Stan on 1 January 2023. It was renewed for a second season on 12 March 2024, which premiered on 1 January 2025.

In the United States, the series was released on Sundance Now and AMC+. In the United Kingdom, the show aired on BBC Four in August 2023 and BBC Two in April 2025, and was released as catch-up on BBC iPlayer.

== Reception ==
The Sydney Morning Herald's Karl Quinn wrote that "Black Snow is a Trojan horse of a show. It's an effective crime drama that does pretty much all you could ask of it. But lurking inside there's a whole legion of more challenging ideas." Luke Buckmaster of The Guardian gave it three stars, saying it is "a mostly well-made murder mystery that starts strong but runs out of gas as it approaches its twist-filled ending".

== Awards ==
Logie Awards of 2023
Year	Category	Nominee	Result	Ref
2023	Most Outstanding Drama Series, Miniseries or Telemovie	Black Snow	Nominated	
2023	Most Outstanding Supporting Actor	Alexander England	Nominated	

13th AACTA Awards
Year	Category	Nominee	Result	Ref
2024	Best Drama Series	Black Snow	Nominated	
2024	Best Lead Actor in a Drama	Travis Fimmel	Nominated	
2024	Best Supporting Actor in a Drama	Alexander England	Nominated	
2024	Best Supporting Actress in a Drama	Brooke Satchwell	Nominated	
2024	Best Screenplay in Television	Lucas Taylor (Episode 1)	Nominated	
2024	Best Production Design in Television	Helen O'Loan (Episode 1)	Nominated	
2024	Best Sound in Television	Mark Cornish, Tom Heuzenroeder, Justin Spasevski, Robert Mackenzie (Episode 6)	Nominated	

58th AWGIE Awards
Year	Category	Nominee	Result	Ref.
2026	Television – Series	Lucas Taylor ("Running")	Pending	
