= Bad Behaviour (TV series) =

2023 Australian drama series

- Promotional poster
- Genre: Drama
- Based on: Bad Behaviour by Rebecca Starford
- Written by: Pip Karmel; Magda Wozniak
- Directed by: Corrie Chen
- Country of origin: Australia
- Original language: English
- No. of episodes: 4

Production
- Producers: Amanda Higgs; Screen Australia
- Production company: Matchbox Pictures

Original release
- Network: Stan
- Release: 17 February 2023

Bad Behaviour is an Australian four-part television drama miniseries on Stan streaming service. The series, based on the book of the same name by Rebecca Starford, is written by Pip Karmel and Magda Wozniak, directed by Corrie Chen, and produced by Amanda Higgs.

The series depicts the story of how the desire to belong sets in motion a cruel dynamic. It had its international premiere at 73rd Berlin International Film Festival in February 2023, and in Australia premiered on 17 February 2023 on Stan.

== Synopsis ==
Joanne goes to an exclusive boarding school set in the bush called Silver Creek for a year on a scholarship. She tries to build relationships with fellow students in her dormitory, which is unsupervised at night as the teachers are located off campus. The school aims to build resilience by outdoor activities such as camping and marathons.

Much of the story revolves around Jo's relationship with the dorm bully, Portia, and her repeated failure to support the only other scholarship girl, Alice.

== Cast ==
- Jana McKinnon as Jo Mackenzie
- Markella Kavenagh as Portia
- Yerin Ha as Alice
- Erana James as Ronnie
- Dan Spielman as Keith Mackenzie
- Diana Glenn as Caroline Mackenzie
- Tuuli Narkle as Miss Lacey
- Mantshologane Maile as Ruby
- Melissa Kahraman as Briohny
- Daya Czepanski as Saskia
- Bronte Locke
- Abbey Morgan
- Malaynee Hayden
- Jessica Lu
- Nic Layton

== Episodes ==
No.	Title	Directed by	Written by	Original release date
1	"Moth to a Flame"	Corrie Chen	Pip Karmel, Rebecca Starford & Magda Wozniak	February 17, 2023
2	"The Worst"	Corrie Chen	Pip Karmel, Rebecca Starford & Magda Wozniak	February 17, 2023
3	"Exeat"	Corrie Chen	Pip Karmel, Rebecca Starford & Magda Wozniak	February 17, 2023
4	"Wilderness"	Corrie Chen	Pip Karmel, Rebecca Starford & Magda Wozniak	February 17, 2023

== Production ==
The series, based on the book of the same name by Rebecca Starford, is written by Pip Karmel and Magda Wozniak, directed by Corrie Chen, and produced by Amanda Higgs. It is produced under the banner of Matchbox Pictures and funded by Screen Australia.

Filming was wrapped up on 18 March 2022 in Victoria.

== Release ==
The series had its international premiere at 73rd Berlin International Film Festival in Berlinale Series section on 20 February 2023.

It premiered on 17 February 2023 on Stan.

== See also ==
- List of Australian television series
