= Bali 2002 =

- Genre: Historical drama
- Directed by: Peter Andrikidis; Katrina Irawati Graham
- Starring: Rachel Griffiths; Richard Roxburgh; Claudia Jessie; Sean Keenan; Ewen Leslie
- Countries of origin: Australia; Indonesia
- Original languages: English; Indonesian
- No. of series: 1
- No. of episodes: 4

Production
- Executive producers: Tim Pye; Sara Richardson; Michael Healy; Andy Ryan; Amanda Duthie; Cailah Scobie
- Producer: Kerrie Mainwaring
- Production companies: Screentime; Endemol Shine Australia

Original release
- Network: Nine Network; Stan
- Release: 25 September 2022

Bali 2002 is an Australian-Indonesian historical drama television series. Developed by Screentime and Endemol Shine Australia for a co-commission between Stan and Nine Network, the four-part drama revolves around the 2002 Bali bombings. The series premiered on 25 September 2022. The series received a free-to-air release on 7 October.

== Cast ==
=== Main ===
- Richard Roxburgh as Graham Ashton
- Elizabeth Cullen as Nicole McLean
- Sophia Forrest as Natalie Goold
- Saskia Archer as Hanabeth Luke
- Sri Ayu Jati Kartika as Ni-Luh Erniati
- Ewen Leslie as Tony Keirath
- Sean Keenan as Jason McCartney
- Srisacd Sacdpraseuth as General Pastika
- Claudia Jessie as Polly Miller
- Rachel Griffiths as Fiona Wood

=== Supporting ===
- Arka Das as Dr Vij Vijayasekaran
- William Lodder as Jono Liddel
- Anthony Brandon Wong as Dr Harry
- Maleeka Gasbarri as Nerissa
- Murtala as Bambang Priyanto
- Gerwin Widjaja as Gede Badrawan
- Paul Michael Ayre as Dan Miller
- Miah Madden as Danni
- Rob Carlton as Robert Daniels
- Yana Wardana as Praying Balinese man

== Episodes ==
No.	Title	Directed by	Written by	Original release date
1	"Island of the Gods"	Peter Andrikidis & Katrina Irawati Graham	Justin Monjo	25 September 2022
When two large explosions rip through packed nightclubs in Bali, many are killed and many more injured. Volunteers and first responders desperately pull the injured to safety and rush them to local hospitals where medical staff are overwhelmed.
2	"From the Ashes"	Peter Andrikidis & Katrina Irawati Graham	Kris Wyld	25 September 2022
A team of Australian Federal Police is dispatched to Bali to work with Indonesian police, and it becomes clear that the explosions were a coordinated act of terrorism. Injured survivors are evacuated to hospitals all over Australia.
3	"Operation Alliance"	Peter Andrikidis & Katrina Irawati Graham	Kris Wyld	25 September 2022
Australian and Indonesian investigators work together to track down the perpetrators of the Bali bombings as injured survivors and their loved ones try to piece their shattered lives back together.
4	"Restoring the Balance"	Peter Andrikidis & Katrina Irawati Graham	Justin Monjo, Michael Toisuta & Tim Pye	25 September 2022
As some of the perpetrators stand trial, investigators hunt for the elusive mastermind who continues a bombing spree across Indonesia. Injured survivors look to each other for emotional healing and attempt to come to terms with their new lives.

== Production ==
=== Development ===
Bali 2002 was the first original series co-commission between Stan and 9Network. Peter Andrikidis and Katrina Irawati Graham directed the series, and Kerrie Mainwaring of Screentime produced it. Executive producers included Tim Pye, Sara Richardson of Endemol Shine Australia, Michael Healy and Andy Ryan of 9Network, and Amanda Duthie and Cailah Scobie of Stan. Scobie stated the series had been developed by creatives in Australia and Indonesia "and in consultation with those directly impacted". Writers include Justin Monjo, Kris Wyld, Marcia Gardner, and Michael Toisuta with Ketut Yuliarsa as story editor.

=== Casting ===
The cast playing local Balinese as well as Australian and British tourists was announced alongside the series announcement, with Rachel Griffiths, Richard Roxburgh, Claudia Jessie, Sean Keenan, Ewen Leslie starring alongside Arka Das, Anthony Brandon Wong, Paul Ayre, Maleeka Gasbarri, Gerwin Widjaja, and Sri Ayu Jati Kartika.

=== Filming ===
Principal photography began at the beginning of March 2022 in Western Sydney where set replicas of Paddy's Pub and the Sari Club were constructed. The production received support from Screen NSW.

== Release ==
Banijay Rights handled the series’ international distribution, which launched sales for it at Banijay’s 2022 London Screenings showcase. On 4 October 2024, Nine Network announced that the show would have weekly episodes via free-to-air from 7 October.
