= Corrie Chen =

Taiwanese-Australian filmmaker, writer, and director

- Born: 1985 or 1986 (age 38–39); Taiwan
- Occupation(s): Filmmaker, writer, and director
- Known for: New Gold Mountain; Bad Behaviour
- Website: www.corriechen.com

Corrie Chen (born 1985 or 1986) is a Taiwanese-Australian filmmaker, writer, and director. She is known for her work on New Gold Mountain and Bad Behaviour.

== Early life ==
Chen grew up in Taiwan. She moved to Australia in 1994 when she was 8. Her father gifted her his old video camera when she was 12. She attended the Victorian College of the Arts and received a Bachelor of Film and Television (Hons) in 2008 and then a Master of Film and Television in 2011.

== Career ==
After directing short films and serving as a director's attachment on shows such as The Leftovers, Chen was brought on to direct three episodes of Mustangs FC. This then led to additional television directing gigs such as for Sisters and Homecoming Queens.

As far back as 2011, Chen had been dreaming of a project dealing with ethnic tensions during Victoria gold rush. That time period fascinated Chen since she was in grade school. In 2021, she directed the 1857-set, New Gold Mountain. She won an ADG Award for Best Direction in a TV or SVOD Mini-Series Episode for her work on the second episode of that series. Chen joined the television adaptation of Bad Behaviour in 2019. The show premiered in 2023.

In 2024, Chen was given the inaugural Screen Presence Trailblazer Award at the Melbourne International Comedy Festival by the Museum of Chinese Australian History. The prize recognizes industry contributions from Asian-Australian creatives in the film and television industry.

== Filmography ==
=== Film ===
| Year | Film | Credited as | | Notes | Ref. |
| Year | Film | Director | Writer | Notes | Ref. |
|---|---|---|---|---|---|
| 2009 | Happy Country | Yes | Yes | Short film | |
| 2010 | Wonder Boy | Yes | Yes | Short film | |
| 2010 | Don't Be Afraid of the Dark | No | No | Set production assistant | |
| 2011 | Bruce Lee Played Badminton Too | Yes | Yes | Short film | |
| 2013 | Zero to Hero | Yes | No | Short film | |
| 2013 | Bloomers | Yes | No | Short film | |
| 2014 | Suicide and Me | Yes | No | Documentary short | |
| 2015 | Reg Makes Contact | Yes | Yes | Short film | |
| 2016 | Tinseltown | Yes | Yes | Short film | |

=== Television ===
| Year | Television show | Credited as | | Notes | Ref. |
| Year | Television show | Director | Producer | Notes | Ref. |
|---|---|---|---|---|---|
| 2014 | Nowhere Boys | Yes | No | Director's attachment | |
| 2015 | Peter Allen: Not the Boy Next Door | No | No | Miniseries, director's attachment | |
| 2017 | Sisters | Yes | No | Season one, episodes 6 and 7 | |
| 2017 | The Leftovers | No | No | Director's attachment | |
| 2017-2020 | Mustangs FC | Yes | No | Nine episodes | |
| 2018 | Homecoming Queens | Yes | Yes | Miniseries | |
| 2019 | Five Bedrooms | Yes | No | Season one, episodes 3 and 4 | |
| 2019 | SeaChange | Yes | No | Season four, episodes 5 and 6 | |
| 2020 | Wentworth | Yes | No | Season eight, episodes 7 and 8 | |
| 2021 | New Gold Mountain | Yes | No | Miniseries | |
| 2023 | Bad Behaviour | Yes | No | Miniseries | |
| 2023 | The Artful Dodger | Yes | No | | |
| 2025 | Good Cop/Bad Cop | Yes | No | 2 episodes | |

== Awards and nominations ==
| Year | Award | Category | Work | Result | Ref. |
|---|---|---|---|---|---|
| 2014 | ADG Awards | Best Documentary Directing (Stand Alone Under 60 mins) | Suicide and Me | Won | |
| 2015 | AACTA Awards | Best Short Fiction Film | Reg Makes Contact | Nominated | |
| 2016 | ADG Awards | Best Short Film | Reg Makes Contact | Nominated | |
| 2018 | Film Victoria Awards | Greg Tepper award | n/a | Won | |
| 2018 | AACTA Awards | Best Online Video or Series | Homecoming Queens | Nominated | |
| 2020 | Asian-Australian Leadership Awards | 40 Under 40 Most Influential Asian-Australians - Arts and Culture | n/a | Listed | |
| 2022 | ADG Awards | Best Direction in a TV or SVOD Miniseries Episode | New Gold Mountain, Episode 2 | Won | |
| 2024 | Museum of Chinese Australian History | Screen Presence Trailblazer Award | n/a | Won | |
