= List of Please Like Me episodes =

Please Like Me is an Australian television comedy-drama series created, written and directed by and starring Josh Thomas. It premiered on ABC2 on 28 February 2013. The show focuses on Josh (Josh Thomas) and his dysfunctional family and friends. The titles of each episode refer to either a food or drink.

A total of 32 episodes of Please Like Me aired during the show's four seasons.

== Series overview ==
Series	Episodes	Originally released		
Series	Episodes	First released	Last released	Network
1	6	28 February 2013	28 March 2013	ABC2
2	10	12 August 2014	14 October 2014	ABC2
3	10	15 October 2015	17 December 2015	ABC
4	6	9 November 2016	14 December 2016	ABC

== Episodes ==
=== Season 1 (2013) ===
No. overall	No. in season	Title	Directed by	Written by	Original release date	Aus. viewers
1	1	"Rhubarb and Custard"	Matthew Saville	Josh Thomas	28 February 2013	176,000
Josh (Josh Thomas) is dumped by his girlfriend Claire (Caitlin Stasey) because she believes he's gay, which he thought was just a phase. Josh visits his friend and housemate Tom (Thomas Ward) at work, he meets Tom's attractive gay workmate Geoffrey (Wade Briggs). Geoffrey invites himself to dinner at their place. At dinner, Josh has a confrontation with Tom's overbearing girlfriend Niamh (Nikita Leigh-Pritchard), who he wants to dump. Geoffrey asks to stay the night and Josh and Geoffrey share a bed and an awkward kiss. The next morning Josh learns his mother, Rose (Debra Lawrance), has attempted suicide. Josh's dad Alan (David Roberts) fears it's because of their divorce. He has a new girlfriend, Mae (Renee Lim), who Rose doesn't know about. On the way to the hospital, Josh tells Tom about Geoffrey with both of them ignoring Josh's coming out. Worried over her safety, Rose's psychiatrist cannot release her unless she has someone at home with her. After pretending to hold it together, Josh sheds a private tear at home before resolving to move back in with his mother.
2	2	"French Toast"	Matthew Saville	Josh Thomas	28 February 2013	176,000
Josh tries to get Rose in a positive mood before her first visit to her psychiatrist. Alan drops off Josh's belongings back at his home, but first abandons Mae at a shop to hide her from Rose. On the way to her session, Rose breaks down in tears and insists she doesn't need to go. Josh goes to see Tom, who once again insists he's going to dump Niamh, and makes dinner plans with Geoffrey. Rose's psychiatrist recommends she not be left alone in case she attempts suicide again, causing Josh a dilemma. Out of options, he calls Rose's irritable aunt Peg (Judi Farr). Tom tells Claire his plans to break up with Niamh and invites her over afterwards, however Niamh preempts him and instead twists the conversation, causing him to apologize to her and promise to treat her better, making it awkward when Claire later arrives. After their clumsy date, Josh and Geoffrey arrive back at the house and start to have sex, but Josh keeps finding reasons to stop, afraid of having sex for the first time. Geoffrey reassures him, and tells him that they can take it as slow as he likes. Alan calls Josh worried for Rose when she doesn't answer the phone. Josh goes to check up on her, finding her and Peg asleep on the couch, before going back to sleep with Geoffrey.
3	3	"Portuguese Custard Tarts"	Matthew Saville	Josh Thomas	7 March 2013	178,000
Alan buys a new sports car, despite Josh and Mae's objections. While dropping Josh off at Tom's dinner party, Peg sees him kissing Geoffrey and uses it to blackmail him into going to church. At the party, Niamh tells the group that Tom gave her chlamydia, causing Tom to finally dump her. Alan and Mae go out to dinner, but Alan gets drunk and can't stop talking about Rose, so Mae leaves him in the restaurant. Looking after Rose, Peg tries to understand Rose's depression, giving her beer and ice-cream to try and cheer her up. Josh and Geoffrey leave to collect Alan who is drunk and can't drive home. Left alone, Tom and Claire get closer and eventually kiss. On the way to pick up Alan, Josh and Geoffrey discuss why Josh won't come out to his family. Geoffrey later strikes up conversation with Alan, outing Josh to his father, who is accepting. The next morning, the group, including a hungover Alan, go to church with Peg and Rose. The priest gives a sermon on homosexuality, prompting Peg to give a speech about how she loves Josh in spite of being gay, outing Josh to his mother. After they walk out during the service, Rose assures Josh she always knew. A shocked Tom gets a phone call from Niamh who says she's pregnant.
4	4	"All You Can Eat"	Matthew Saville	Josh Thomas	14 March 2013	Not ranked
Josh has broken up with Geoffrey for being too nice. Rose decides to try online dating, forcing Josh to help her with her profile and using it as a chance to discuss his sexuality. Peg arrives, furious someone has reported her for dangerous driving. As she retakes her driving test, Josh meets with his dad and tells him Rose is online dating. Later, Alan is caught looking up Rose's profile and an angered Mae declares she wants to return to Thailand. After Peg fails her test, Josh tries to cheer her up by playing a game Peg's husband used to play with him in the car. Tom waits all day for Niamh to come over to figure out what to do about the baby but she doesn't show up. Rose matches with Rod (Andrew S. Gilbert) on the dating site. They have a disappointing dinner where they hardly talk. Feeling down, Josh convinces Tom and Claire to go out drinking. On the way home, Tom and Claire share another kiss, but he refuses to invite her back because of Niamh's pregnancy, leaving her upset. After being ditched by a boy he met at the bar, Josh returns home to find a drunk Peg passed out in her car. Feeling lonely and rejected, Josh calls Geoffrey.
5	5	"Spanish Eggs"	Matthew Saville	Josh Thomas	21 March 2013	Not ranked
Rod runs into a naked Geoffrey in Josh's bathroom, revealing his homophobic opinions. Tom and Niamh discuss what to do about the baby. Tom wants to keep it and Niamh gets angry and edgy when Tom wants to go to the doctor's appointment with her. Josh reveals to Rose that Alan has a girlfriend before he arrives to help them clean for the open house. Rose pretends to be fine with it, but the two pair spend the day sniping back and forth, resorting to sending angry text messages when the estate agent arrives. Geoffrey surprises Josh with tickets to a game of [AFL] football, much to Josh's chagrin. After being kicked out of the game for Geoffrey's homophobic language, they argue about Josh's inability to be affectionate in public. Josh and Claire go shopping for their 70s themed dinner party and Claire tells Josh her feelings for Tom, but Josh tells her Tom wants to stay with Niamh and the baby. When Tom and Niamh arrive for the party with the news Niamh was never pregnant, Claire and Niamh fight over her lies and Tom dumps Niamh again for Claire. Geoffrey comes over to talk to Josh, hoping to give their relationship another try but Josh refuses, ending it. After the estate agent leaves the open house, Rose tries to wake Peg but finds she has passed away.
6	6	"Horrible Sandwiches"	Matthew Saville	Josh Thomas	28 March 2013	Not ranked
It's Josh's 21st birthday, and also the day of Peg's funeral. Josh tells Tom he feels bad he hasn't cried yet. Rose is doing her best to have a positive attitude for the funeral, even being nice to Alan and inviting Mae, whom she gets along with. At the church, Rose can't bring herself to read Peg's self-written eulogy so Josh steps in, reading Peg's declaration of love for them both. Back at the house, an uninvited Niamh tries to make a show of sadness, but Rose bluntly tells her to leave. Alan and Rod chat but almost come to blows when Rod insults Mae, which makes her reconsider going back to Thailand. When the wake is over, the group present Josh with a surprise birthday cake only to find him crying uncontrollably. Later, Rose insists everyone go to the party planned for Josh, not wanting to ruin his birthday. Geoffrey presents Josh with a cuckoo clock as a gift, prompting Josh to ask him to get back together. This time Geoffrey refuses, saying Josh only wants him when he's feeling needy and alone. Deciding to leave and go home, Josh finds Rose collapsed on the kitchen floor having attempted suicide again. Rose insists she's fine after changing her mind and throwing up the pills. Josh takes her to bed and sleeps on the floor beside her.

=== Season 2 (2014) ===
No. overall	No. in season	Title	Directed by	Written by	Original release date	Aus. viewers
7	1	"Milk"	Matthew Saville	Josh Thomas	12 August 2014	103,000
Josh and Tom go on a night out with new roommate Patrick (Charles Cottier), where Tom taunts Josh about his attraction to Patrick. The next morning, he is visibly annoyed when Tom and Patrick's one night stands leave. Later he meets up with his dad, Mae, and his new little sister Grace for lunch, where Alan insists Josh babysit to bond with Grace. That evening, Josh looks after Grace while Alan and Mae go out to dinner. At the house, Niamh, whom Tom has been enjoying a friends-with-benefits situation after Claire leaves to go to Germany, shows up. Patrick also has a Grindr hookup, annoying Josh. When Grace needs a diaper change, an inept Josh takes her into the shower. Alan and Mae arrive to pick up Grace, finding the house full of people. Soon after, a manic Rose arrives with a new hairdo, dress, and puppy, announcing she has quit her medication.
8	2	"Ham"	Matthew Saville	Josh Thomas	19 August 2014	74,000
Josh visits Rose in the mental hospital ICU. They move Rose into the main hospital after she eventually agrees to a voluntary stay. Josh returns home to get ready for Patrick's birthday party, and is greeted by an early party guest, Arnold (Keegan Joyce). The party begins with Josh and Tom hiding in the corner. Tom meets Jenny (Charlotte Nicdao) and decides he wants to kiss her, spending the rest of the party with her. Rose tries to acclimatize to the hospital, going for dinner and eating it alone in her room. Josh also feels out of place at the party, eventually becoming friendly with Arnold, who he learns has also spent time in a mental home. After her dinner, Rose discovers her roommate Ginger (Denise Drysdale) attempting suicide in the bathroom. Using this as a distraction, she slips out of the home. During a game of beer pong, Josh and Arnold trade play insults but the party gets tense when Josh mentions Arnold is adopted, causing Arnold's brother to get angry. This dies down and they make up just as Rose arrives. Josh takes her back to the hospital, staying for dinner with Ginger and her friend Hannah (Hannah Gadsby).
9	3	"Parmigiana"	Matthew Saville	Josh Thomas	26 August 2014	64,000
Josh receives a phone call from his ex-boyfriend Geoffrey (Wade Briggs), who wants to have dinner. While visiting Rose in the hospital, Josh happens upon Arnold who has also checked in for his anxiety issues. Ginger gets annoyed when Hannah tries to explain why she is in the hospital. While Josh is getting ready for his date with Geoffrey, Tom accidentally sends a sext meant for Niamh to Jenny. Josh and Geoffrey catch up on their date, returning to Josh's house to have sex, during which Geoffrey bursts into tears revealing his father has just died. Back at the hospital, Ginger is bored and forces the others to play a game of hide and seek. Trying to find somewhere to hide, Rose meets fellow patient Stuart (Bob Franklin), and both of them hide out in the bushes, where they have sex. Tom and Jenny decide to start an exclusive relationship. When Josh goes to get him and Geoffrey some wine, he returns to find Geoffrey has left, sending Josh a voicemail apology.
10	4	"Gang Keow Wan"	Matthew Saville	Josh Thomas & Thomas Ward	2 September 2014	65,000
Josh goes out for dinner but offends his date with his opinions and is told he is not a nice person. Josh skypes Claire in Germany, annoyed by his date, and she asks to stay with him when she comes home. Tom is continuing his friends-with-benefits arrangement with Niamh while still seeing Jenny. After asking Josh for help, Tom is forced to tell Niamh about Jenny, causing Niamh to call Jenny and tell her they slept together the previous night. Tom finally storms off when Josh tells him Claire is coming home. Arnold calls Josh to invite him to Hannah's choir concert. Rose tries to keep her encounter with Stuart a secret from Ginger. On the way to the concert, Josh and Patrick get stuck in traffic while Josh offloads on Patrick about his date. When Patrick offends Josh, Patrick kisses him to say sorry. Tom goes to see Jenny to attempt to patch things up, and later buys her a rabbit to make up. While still in traffic Josh needs to pee, eventually resorting to peeing in a takeaway cup and missing the concert. At the concert, Stuart reveals to Rose that he's married. Back home, Josh tries to kiss Patrick again but Patrick rejects him.
11	5	"Sausage Sizzle"	Matthew Saville	Josh Thomas & Liz Doran	9 September 2014	57,000
A tampon causes plumbing issues in Josh's house, as well as a hefty bill. Josh asks his dad to help with the bill but Alan refuses, telling Josh he needs to be more responsible, especially after Josh is caught drawing over a swastika in the bathroom of a mall. Rose tells Hannah about her encounter with Stuart, but Ginger overhears and gets angry when Rose talks about her. With Claire home from Germany, the group wants to go out, but Tom promised to attend Jenny's school musical which they all crash. At the show, Claire spots Jenny's sanitary pad wings, confirming to Josh it was her tampon that caused the plumbing problem. Josh and Patrick slip off while Tom and Claire stay to watch the rest of the show. Ginger and Rose make up when Stuart's wife visits him at the hospital, resulting in Ginger throwing a coin at her. Josh and Patrick hang out together and begin to make out just as Tom, Claire and Jenny find them. A drunk Claire tells Jenny they could see her wings during the show and Jenny storms off. Tom reveals he was the one who flushed the tampon after looking at it because of his curiosity.
12	6	"Lapin La Cocotte"	Matthew Saville	Josh Thomas & Thomas Ward	16 September 2014	64,000
When Patrick spends the night in Josh's bed, Josh tries to initiate sex, with Patrick making excuses not to until he tells Josh he doesn't feel that way about him. After Gavin the rabbit dies, Tom takes him to Jenny's house to be buried. After an awkward encounter with Patrick, Josh tells Claire about what happened and decides to take his mother to the zoo. Trying to borrow his dad's car, Alan and Mae decide to go to take Grace to the zoo too. Josh tries to get everyone to go quickly but Ginger refuses. At the zoo, Mae argues with Alan about his job taking up too much of his time. An annoyed Josh vents to Arnold as they explore the attractions. The pair get closer sharing life stories and eventually share a kiss. While burying the rabbit, Jenny gets angry at Tom. Dragging him to her room, she hits him and rapes him. Dropping Rose and the others back at the hospital, Alan tells Josh and Mae he's semi-retiring from his job and he needs to cut back giving Josh money. As they're talking, Rose runs out of the hospital and tells them Ginger has killed herself.
13	7	"Scroggin"	Matthew Saville	Josh Thomas	23 September 2014	62,000
After Ginger's death, Josh and Rose go on a camping trip to Tasmania. During the days, the pair spend the time talking about their issues, but at night Josh listens as Rose cries herself to sleep. Rose is angry that Ginger didn't tell her about her suicide plan, and she still hasn't read the note Ginger left her. They talk about Rose's suicide attempts and Josh tells her about a time he wrote a suicide note as a teenager. Josh tries to get his mother to open up about her opinions, having never heard her have one. Rose questions Josh about his opinions after her attempted suicides because she is so angry at Ginger. Josh says he was never angry, but after the third attempt he was angry at the possibility of having to watch her die slowly in the hospital due to her overdose. On their last night, Rose reveals she got some marijuana from Tom and smokes it with Josh as she tries to get him to talk about Patrick and his sexuality. While waiting for the boat home, Rose resolves to go back to the hospital, and explains her reasons for her suicide attempts. Finally, she reads Ginger's note.
14	8	"Truffled Mac and Cheese"	Matthew Saville	Josh Thomas & Thomas Ward	30 September 2014	48,000
Patrick moves out of the house, with Josh being unable to say goodbye properly. Josh makes macaroni and cheese with the last of his truffle oil, a gift from Patrick, which Tom then eats. As revenge, Josh barricades Tom in his bedroom and turns off the wifi. Josh goes to visit Arnold, who is confused about their relationship. After Josh confesses he wasn't sure if he was allowed to date, Arnold turns him down before Josh changes his mind with a kiss. Back at home, Josh tells Tom and Claire he's going on a date with Arnold. He also begins working on his resume but finds he suddenly has no ink to print it. Alan refuses to pay for ink but tells Josh he has a plan for how he can earn money. Arriving at the house, he reveals to Josh he's bought a coffee cart and Josh is going to run it. Rose and Hannah talk about Ginger with Rose finding comfort in Stuart. Arnold calls Josh to tell him he is being released from the hospital, and that his psychiatrist wants to meet him, which Josh thinks is strange. Josh, Tom and Claire discuss their relationship issues, with Tom revealing he really still has feelings for Claire, and that he could get out of the room the whole time. Josh also finds the prank that used all his ink and the three group hug.
15	9	"Skinny Latte"	Matthew Saville	Josh Thomas & Liz Doran	7 October 2014	82,000
Josh and Tom are wrapping candies for Josh's coffee cart when Tom confesses he always thought he'd to get back together with Claire. The next morning, Arnold calls Josh to tell him before their date his parents don't know he's gay, but he's interrupted by Alan calling to tell Josh he's going to propose to Mae. In the hospital, Stuart reveals to Rose that he's being released. Rose also reveals that she's been told she can leave too, but thinks they made a mistake and she needs more time. Josh sets up his cart for his first day with Alan fussing around. Rose and Hannah pay a visit to the cart where Rose gets into an argument with Alan, and later Mae, over a camera. During this, Arnold's psychiatrist Marilyn (Roz Hammond) arrives and Josh proceeds to make conversational faux pas. She suggests the boys date with a group rather than alone, so Josh invites Tom. Rose tries to say goodbye to Stuart but is put off by his wife. She is upset until she finds Stuart decorated her room with homemade birds. This prompts Rose to decide to move back home and she invites Hannah to live with her. After picking up Arnold for their date, Josh runs over a possum, causing Arnold to have a panic attack and ask to go home.
16	10	"Margherita"	Matthew Saville	Josh Thomas	14 October 2014	55,000
Tom tells Josh he's considering giving up relationships and just hiring prostitutes for sex. Josh and Arnold go out for their first non-safe date to a gay club where they run into a drunk Patrick. Josh decides he needs to take him home. At home, Tom calls Niamh, hoping for a hook up but Niamh turns him down, so he finds a prostitute and calls her. Josh and Arnold try to find where Patrick lives and discuss Arnold's therapy sessions. Josh tries to give Arnold simple solutions to his problems but is distracted when Patrick wanders into the ocean. When Josh tries to help him, Patrick kisses him, leaving Arnold feeling rejected. As Josh tries to explain he wants them to be boyfriends Arnold has a panic attack, after which he asks Josh to take him back to the hospital. Tom's prostitute arrives but he panics and hides in the bathroom. The next morning Josh and Arnold go to watch Alan propose to Mae in a hot air balloon. Leaving Grace with Arnold, the three of them go up where Alan proposes but Mae turns him down and Josh is violently sick. Josh takes Arnold to the hospital where they meet Rose and Hannah checking out. At their new place, Hannah misreads the signs and tries to kiss Rose, which Rose stops but insists she's flattered. Back at home, Josh finds Tom in the spa after their terrible nights. As he tries to cheer up Tom, Josh realizes he wants to be with Arnold. Going back to the hospital, Josh gets in bed with him. Arnold maintains he can't handle a relationship, but Josh tells him they're just two buddies having a nap as they fall asleep in each other's arms.

=== Season 3 (2015) ===
No. overall	No. in season	Title	Directed by	Written by	Original release date	Aus. viewers
17	1	"Eggplant"	Matthew Saville	Josh Thomas	15 October 2015	129,000
Josh unexpectedly receives a call from Arnold who hasn't talked to him for a while, which Arnold blames on exams, and agrees to come for dinner to celebrate their new baby chickens. After dinner, Tom questions why Josh agreed to be just friends with Arnold when he clearly still likes him so much. Later when he has nightmares, Josh asks to sleep in Tom's room which Josh describes as the loneliest thing they've ever done. Rose visits and complains about how Arnold is treating Josh, telling him to find someone else. Arnold hangs out with Josh and Tom again, this time passionately kissing Josh before leaving. A few days later at a maze, Arnold confides in Josh that he feels he isn't likeable and Josh wants Arnold to organize their next date. Arnold agrees and sets up a romantic picnic where the two have sex for the first time. Josh, Tom and Claire skype and discuss their sex lives. Arnold tells Josh about his insecurities and the lies he's told to appear likeable to Josh, including that he really doesn't like Love Actually and his parents don't mind if he stays out all night which he finally does. After this Arnold goes quiet again for over a week, not replying to Josh's messages, until he suddenly appears drunk one night and tells Josh he loves him. Not knowing how to reply, Josh pretends to be asleep. Later, after talking with Mae, Josh tells Arnold he loves him and is hurt when Arnold doesn't say it back and denies saying it at all. Josh decides he can't handle it anymore and asks Arnold to leave. A few days later, Arnold returns and, using cards inspired by Love Actually, apologizes and tells Josh he loves him too.
18	2	"Simple Carbohydrates"	Matthew Saville	Josh Thomas, Thomas Ward & Liz Doran	22 October 2015	156,000
Hannah gets stressed while trying to pay her phone bill and starts self-harming again. Rose decides they should go out to a lesbian bar as it's Friday night. While having dinner, Mae suddenly confesses to Alan she had an affair while she was pregnant, because of her hormones, with a man she met on a pregnancy fetish website. Tom gets angry when Josh buys bread after they both agreed they would give it up to stop eating gluten. When Arnold arrives for dinner, he tells them he's going to come out to his parents and Tom gets angry when Arnold eats the bread. Later, Rose calls Josh looking for Hannah but finds her and interrupts her making out with a girl. The two have an argument when Rose doesn't believe Hannah actually likes her. Alan tries to remain calm over Mae's affair but lashes out when she tries to be intimate, and later calls Josh to talk about it. Claire calls the boys and tells them she's going to come home again. Mae calls Josh in a panic thinking Alan has left but he was just outside. Josh decides to pick him up after he clearly isn't dealing with the situation. Back at the house, Josh gets his dad and Arnold to practice Arnold's coming out, ending in Arnold singing Chandelier and everyone crying.
19	3	"Croquembouche"	Matthew Saville	Josh Thomas, Thomas Ward & Liz Doran	29 October 2015	140,000
Alan, currently staying at Josh and Tom's house, is spending time wandering around the house. Josh tries to reassure him everything is going to be fine but is unsuccessful. On the way to Arnold's birthday party, Josh, Tom and Hannah discuss ways to make Arnold's parents like Josh. Tom also finds out his boss, with whom he had a sexual encounter, is being sued for sexual harassment by two of Tom's workmates and he's being offered $5000 to keep quiet. Josh is slightly upset when Arnold said he can't bring in his cake because his brother (Nick Cody) always organizes the cake. Arnold introduces Josh to his parents, and Josh has an awkward conversation with Arnold's father (Geoff Morrell) while Arnold's mother (Gina Riley) tries to make small talk with a disinterested Hannah. Rose gets a call from Stuart who has secretly checked back into the hospital but pretends to be gardening. He encourages Rose to clean her house and also tells her he's gotten divorced. In a strange decision, Josh tries on Arnold's mother's wedding ring which gets stuck, causing a dilemma to remove. At the house, Alan wanders around sadly, telling John the dog he's getting old and might die soon and discovers Adele the chicken is actually a rooster. When Arnold's father forces him to make a speech, Arnold takes this chance to come out, which his mother and brother already know but his father takes badly. Arnold's mother suggests he go stay with Josh for a while and is very supportive. Going back home, the boys find Alan on the roof and they try to cheer Alan up. Rose asks Hannah about coming off her medication and Hannah confesses she has stopped but has started feeling depressed and self-harming again, telling Rose to keep taking her pills.
20	4	"Natural Spring Water"	Josh Thomas	Josh Thomas	5 November 2015	131,000
Josh, Tom and Arnold take MDMA, giving Arnold a minor panic attack and worries about dehydrating. When the drugs kick in, Josh and Arnold become very affectionate and Tom calls Alan, who is in the middle of having sex with Mae. Taken by the drugs, the boys decide to go out to a club. There they meet Ella (Emily Barclay), who tells them they should go for a run on MDMA during which Tom falls and breaks his arm and asks Ella to kiss him. In the ambulance, Ella leads the group in teasing the driver. At the emergency department, Josh and Arnold get to know Ella, who questions their relationship and brings up the issue their monogamy. Ella confesses she shouldn't have kissed Tom because she has a boyfriend who Josh and Arnold convince her to break up with after she describes all the mean things he's done to her. After breaking up, Ella tells them about how she feels like she always makes bad decisions. While Tom is being treated, Alan calls him after Mae dumps him. Alan confesses he feels foolish and upset, and Tom blurts out they're at the hospital and that they were on drugs, prompting an angry Alan to come get them. Meanwhile, Mae calls Josh to tell him why, but Josh understands given his parents' divorce and tells her it's better for Grace rather than having two unhappy parents. When Alan arrives he angrily rants at Josh, letting out all his emotions, before calming down and taking them home.
21	5	"Coq Au Vin"	Matthew Saville	Josh Thomas	12 November 2015	127,000
On Tuesday, Josh and Arnold try to deal with Adele being a rooster as Claire arrives back from Germany. On Wednesday, Ella decides to write Tom's dreams on his cast. Josh and Claire discuss the options on how to deal with Adele, eventually deciding to kill and eat her. Josh visits Rose and is put off by Stuart, while Hannah tries to keep an orchid alive. On Thursday, Josh and Arnold discuss their monogamy situation, which Arnold thinks is archaic. Ella tries to get Tom to tell her more of his dreams. Rose decides to join Hannah in keeping an orchid. Claire rants to Josh about Ella but she overhears them. On Friday, Arnold puts forward his case for an open relationship, which Josh agrees to. Tom struggles to get dressed in his cast without help. Josh separates Adele from the other chickens while Tom is angry Ella won't come over after what Claire said about her. Tom believes Claire is jealous of Ella. Hannah gives her wilting orchid tea. Ella complains to Tom about how Claire made her feel. On Saturday, the time has come to kill Adele. Josh tries to kill her but is unable causing a distressed Claire to do it instead. Stuart comments on Hannah's wilting orchid, then comments on her hips and offends her. Hannah argues back, annoyed at his comments before cutting the head off her orchid. Josh and Claire go for a run where Claire tells him how badly her life had gone before confessing she's pregnant and wants him to come with her to the abortion clinic. On Sunday, Josh cooks Adele. As the group tries to say something, Tom begins to sing Someone Like You, and they all join in.
22	6	"Pancakes with Faces"	Matthew Saville	Josh Thomas & Liz Doran	19 November 2015	141,000
Claire wonders if she should keep the baby and raise it with Josh. Arnold goes for a trial sleepover at his parents' house. While Josh and Claire are at the abortion clinic, Tom and Ella go to the dentist. Rose discovers that Stuart is cheating on her with his wife and wants revenge. Alan is staying in a hotel after breaking up with Mae and is ignoring her calls, even though she is missing him. He goes apartment hunting and calls Josh to join him, but Josh is staying with Claire to help her through the abortion. Once the pills have worked, Claire becomes upset. Josh devises a game to help her open up about her feelings. Josh admits she thought about keeping the baby, while Claire thought her politics would keep her safe from her feelings. She feels guilty, but Josh assures her she has done nothing to feel guilty about. Rose decides to write the c-word on Stuart's lawn as revenge but runs out of paint. Ella asks Tom to be her boyfriend. Arnold returns from his trial sleepover angry that, even though his father apologized, he said he was 'working' on accepting him. With Arnold and Claire's bad moods, Tom decides the day has come to destroy his cardboard city, however, when John doesn't break anything, Claire dresses up in a dinosaur onesie and smashes the cardboard.
23	7	"Puff Pastry Pizza"	Matthew Saville	Josh Thomas	26 November 2015	113,000
Tom builds a piñata filled with his, Josh and Claire's secrets to try and ease tension within the group. When they break it open they reveal the secrets to each other, including how Tom knew Josh was gay when he was 18. With Arnold away at maths camp, Josh decides to invite a boy over, even though he really doesn't want to. When the boy, Ben (David Quirk), arrives Josh awkwardly offers him food before Ben kisses him. Tom and Claire are left to spend the evening together. As they start to kiss, Claire stops herself. Instead they play a game called Penis or Not Penis with the losers doing dares. Josh gets over the initial awkwardness and has sex with Ben. After, Josh makes him food and they get to know each other before having sex again. Tom loses the game and is dared to interrupt Josh and ask for permission to use the bathroom. Josh takes a bath with Ben and ignores a call from Arnold, confessing he has a boyfriend. The two share stories they've never told anyone else, and Ben tells Josh he has a cerebral aneurysm and could die at any minute. Claire interrupts with her dare to sit in the hot tub for 15 seconds. Ben stays the night. When Arnold returns, Josh continues as normal.
24	8	"Amoxicillin"	Matthew Saville	Josh Thomas & Liz Doran	3 December 2015	N/A
Ben calls Josh from the hospital, saying he wants to see him again. Tom has chlamydia, again. Having lied to Ella about having a sexual health test before they had sex, Tom comes up with a plan to slip Ella the treatment in her food, which Josh reluctantly agrees to. Josh calls Ben back and asks if he wants him to visit him in hospital. Josh agrees to look after Grace so Mae can try to win back Alan. Unable to get the pill in Ella's food, just pretends he has worms and that everyone needs to take the medication in case they're infected. The group freaks out and Tom is angry. Tom and Josh tell Claire the plan and insists they keep to it. Stuart comes to see Rose and apologizes for cheating, but refuses to leave when they ask him to. Panicked, Rose calls Alan who comes to chase Stuart away. Josh and Ben continue to voicemail each other. When Alan calls Josh to tell him about Stuart, Ella makes Josh tell Alan about the worms but he pretends it's a joke, telling Arnold what's really happening. When Tom returns with the worm medication, the others take it while Tom sneaks Ella the chlamydia treatment. When Alan arrives at Rose's house, Stuart freaks out and jumps on Alan's car. Alan then drives him away, flinging him onto the road, and driving Rose and Hannah away. Ben asks Josh to visit him before he has an operation on his aneurysm. When Ella wants to have sex with Tom, he has to confess that he has chlamydia.
25	9	"Champagne"	Matthew Saville	Josh Thomas & Thomas Ward	10 December 2015	N/A
Josh goes to see Ben in the hospital with Alan and Mae, without telling Arnold, Tom or Claire. When they see each other, they realize how weird it is and Josh leaves with Ben promising to call him when he's out if he's not dead. With Hannah's ex-girlfriend coming to claim her blender back, Rose and Hannah are forced to clean their house. After seeing Ben, Josh is upset and tells Arnold everything about Ben. Tom is pestering Claire about what she and Josh are being secretive about. Angry, Claire finally tells him about her abortion and Ella suggests they go on the new Ferris wheel. In the wheel, Tom asks if Claire is OK before they all question Josh and Arnold about what's wrong. He tells them about Ben and they make things worse. Josh maintains he doesn't have feelings for Ben but Arnold is doubtful when Claire says Josh has a rescue complex. Tom wonders why he wasn't told about Claire being pregnant and Josh says it was because they thought he might fall for Claire again if she needed help. Later, Ella asks if Tom has feelings for Claire. He confesses it was hard to get over Claire and tells her about when they kissed. Claire tries to explain it was a weak moment when they were locked in together when Josh was with Ben. Arnold is annoyed when he finds out Ben stayed the night with Josh, doubting that Josh only seen him once and that he doesn't have feelings for him. Arnold has a panic attack but Josh uses Arnold's love to maths to explain how unlikely it is for Josh to fall in love with two people at once, when he already loves Arnold and that he wants him to move in with him. Rose and Hannah hide as Hannah's ex comes to collect the blender. Back at home, Josh receives the call to tell him Ben is fine following surgery.
26	10	"Christmas Trifle"	Matthew Saville	Josh Thomas & Thomas Ward	17 December 2015	N/A
Josh has invited everyone over for Christmas lunch. Rose walks in on Hannah self-harming before leaving. Rose also bakes shortbread that no one likes in one of her manic phases. Preparing the dinner, Arnold drops the gravy. The dinner tension begins when Rose makes a comment about cheating. Everyone is upset when they realize there's no gravy. Tension rises when the group tease Hannah about not wearing a cracker hat. Arnold is a little offended when Rose dislikes the vegetarian nut roast Josh made for him. Tension escalates again when Grace begins crying and Mae insists on leaving her to stop crying. While the family make some jokes about Josh, Rose blurts out Josh was right about Arnold not being boring and jokes Mae not checking on Grace means she doesn't care for her, but she apologizes. The controlled crying debate continues and raises tensions. Alan wonders why the boys keep making jokes about Claire being alone, which leads to her admitting she would get back together with Tom if she could, with Arnold joking that Tom is still in love with Claire, upping tensions again. In a quiet moment, Rose tells everyone that Stuart is back in hospital with PTSD after killing three kids in a car accident. Alan asks Josh how Ben is, causing more tension. Arnold lets slip he dropped the gravy when telling about nice things Josh has done for him, causing everyone to get upset again. Arnold makes a joke which no one reacts well too, and winds up throwing his drink into Tom's food before running off. Outside Arnold confesses that he doesn't want to move in with Josh because he's afraid Josh does have feelings for Ben, or that his rescue complex will cause him to find someone else that needs saving, so he decides to spend Christmas with his family. When Josh returns, he starts to boil over when everyone says there's too much dessert and Alan complains about no ice. Finally, he cracks and launches into a rant around the table delivering some home truths. In the end, Josh spends Christmas day alone in the park eating trifle with John.

=== Season 4 (2016) ===
No. overall	No. in season	Title	Directed by	Written by	Original release date	Aus. viewers
27	1	"Babaganoush"	Josh Thomas	Josh Thomas & Thomas Ward	9 November 2016	245,000
Despite the arguments in the previous season, Josh and Arnold try to continue with Arnold's idea of a non-monogamous relationship. Arnold meets Kyle at a gay bar, and decides that they should go back to Josh's house to try a threesome, however Josh feels uncomfortable during the experience and thinks Kyle finds Arnold more attractive than him. Josh visits his mum, who plans to throw away his childhood teddy bears, something Josh struggles to come to terms with. Later that night, Josh has dinner with his dad and Mae, and Arnold and his parents. Josh and Arnold get into a fight and Arnold accuses Josh of constantly teasing him. Josh brushes these comments aside and Arnold responds by calling him manipulative. Josh calls Claire to confide in her, telling her that he thinks Arnold hates him. Meanwhile, Ella and Tom plan on moving out much to Josh's disappointment.
28	2	"Porridge"	Matthew Saville	Josh Thomas & Thomas Ward	16 November 2016	208,000
Josh, Tom, Arnold, and Ella take Hannah camping for her birthday. While camping, they stumble upon an ambulance on the beach, and Ella, Tom, and Hannah approach to find out what happened, leaving Josh with an irritable Arnold. The two begin to argue, with Josh accusing Arnold of always needing to be rescued and suggesting that Arnold hates Josh and that Arnold should just break up with him already. The next day, Hannah's birthday treasure hunt goes awry when she throws a can of silly string at Arnold, cutting open his forehead. Later while having sex with Josh, his bandage falls off and the open-wound makes Josh feel uneasy. Josh confides in Tom that he keeps trying to chase the feelings he used to have for Arnold, but that they are becoming more elusive and ultimately decides he needs to break up with Arnold. At the same time, an uninformed Ella accidentally reassures Arnold that Josh loves him before Tom can warn her of Josh's intentions. Hannah lights off fireworks much to the entertainment of only Arnold, while the others are all privy to the impending breakup. In the morning, Josh breaks up with Arnold, and they argue.
29	3	"Beluga Caviar"	Josh Thomas	Josh Thomas, Thomas Ward & Liz Doran	23 November 2016	214,000
Josh, now single, tries to get back into the dating game, but finds it hard, with every date bringing a new oddity or awkward moment, from meth-smoking podiatrists to a kooky one night stand who believes that humans glow in the dark. Josh meets Alan and Mae and they discuss Arnold, who we see has moved on. Meanwhile, Tom and Ella make plans to move out while trying to help Josh disguise a hickey, and Josh's mum is getting incredibly irritable with her housemate.
30	4	"Degustation"	Matthew Saville	Josh Thomas & Thomas Ward	30 November 2016	N/A
Josh feels that his mother's depression has been worse recently, and wants to do something nice for his parents, so he takes Alan and Rose out for a degustation dinner - a culinary experience that involves tasting 15 tiny, deconstructed, innovative portions. The trio argue about the past, reminiscence about Josh's childhood, and get some things off their chests.
31	5	"Burrito Bowl"	Matthew Saville	Josh Thomas, Thomas Ward & Liz Doran	7 December 2016	N/A
Ella has a health scare, and is examined by an incredibly attractive doctor, and Tom finds himself being irrationally jealous about this. Meanwhile Josh unexpectedly runs into his first boyfriend, Geoffrey. The two catch up, talk about their plans for life, and have an enjoyable night together. Then a tragedy strikes that will change Josh's life forever.
32	6	"Souvlaki"	Josh Thomas	Josh Thomas, Thomas Ward & Liz Doran	14 December 2016	N/A
Tom and Ella move out of the share house. Josh confronts Claire on the growing distance between them. Ella breaks up with Tom. This leads to Tom moving into Josh's new house, the series ends with the camera floating out of the window, as the credits play.

== DVD Releases ==
Series	Episodes	DVD release date
Series	Episodes	Region 4
1	6	April 4, 2013
2	10	October 30, 2014
3	10	January 14, 2016
4	6	TBA
