= My Brilliant Career (TV series) =

Australian television series

- Genre: Period drama
- Based on: My Brilliant Career by Miles Franklin
- Developed by: Liz Doran
- Showrunner: Liz Doran
- Written by: Liz Doran; Sarinah Masukor; Rachael Turk
- Directed by: Alyssa McClelland; Anne Renton
- Starring: Philippa Northeast; Christopher Chung; Anna Chancellor; Genevieve O'Reilly; Kate Mulvany; Jake Dunn; Alexander England; Sherry-Lee Watson; Miah Madden
- Theme music composer: François Tétaz; Molly Lewis
- Country of origin: Australia
- Original language: English
- No. of episodes: 6

Production
- Executive producers: Chloe Rickard; Liz Doran; Alyssa McClelland
- Producer: Paul Ranford
- Cinematography: Kieran Fowler; Marden Dean
- Production companies: Jungle Entertainment; South Australian Film Corporation

Original release
- Network: Netflix
- Release: 13 August 2026

My Brilliant Career is a six-part Australian television period drama miniseries for Netflix. Set in rural Australia in the early 20th century, the series stars Philippa Northeast in the lead role as headstrong aspiring writer Sybylla, and Christopher Chung as Harry Beecham, her love interest. It is based on the novel of the same name by Miles Franklin, but includes additional plotlines and characters. Liz Doran is the showrunner and co-writer for the series, which is directed by Alyssa McClelland and Anne Renton. It premiered on 13 August 2026, with two soundtrack albums released on the same day.

== Plot ==
The series follows Sybylla, a girl growing up in a rural town in Australia in the early 20th century, with ambitions to become a writer. Her plans are disrupted by a budding romance with a young man called Harry.

== Cast ==
=== Main cast ===
- Philippa Northeast as Sybylla Melvyn
- Christopher Chung as Harry Beecham
- Anna Chancellor as Winifred Bossier, Sybylla's grandmother
- Genevieve O'Reilly as Helen Bell, Sybylla's aunt
- Kate Mulvany as Augusta Beecham, Harry's aunt
- Jake Dunn as Frank Hawden, an Englishman staying with Mrs Bossier
- Alexander England as Julius Bossier, Sybylla's uncle
- Sherry-Lee Watson as Nell Kirby, an Aboriginal horse trainer
- Miah Madden as Betty Kirby, a servant of Mrs Bossier
- Nathan Page as Richard Melvyn

=== Supporting cast ===
- Rohan Nichol as Mr. McSwat
- Reagan Mannix as Sergeant Jack Baker
- Ella Oliphant as Gertie Melvyn, Sybylla's sister
- Ines English as Blanche Derrick, Harry Beecham's fiancée
- Jarron Andy as Charlie, a drover who is Nell's love interest
- Mirrah Foulkes as Lucy Melvyn
- William McKenna as Peter McSwat
- Max Mayer-Rayment as Jim Reid
- Genevieve Mooy as Mrs. O'Brien
- Chrissie Page as Mrs. Klein
- Abbie Grace MacDonald as Hannah Melvyn
- Ella Moyle as Frances Melvyn
- Monty Bouwmeester as Daniel Melvyn
- Harper Rickard-Cain as Florence Melvyn
- Tom Spall as musician, NYE Band
- Jake Morrison as musician, NYE Band
- David Blumberg as musician, NYE Band
- Ursula Yovich as Rose Kirby, mother of Nell and Betty
- Alex Fitzalan as Everard Grey
- Daniel Demczuk as Eddie Melvyn
- Erik Thomson as Theodore Hardwicke
- Indigo Parer as Buzz
- Thelma Plum as Pearl (singer)

== Episodes ==
No.	Title	Directed by	Written by	Original release date
1	"Revolt"	Alyssa McClelland	Liz Doran	13 August 2026
2	"He"	Alyssa McClelland	Sarinah Masukor and Liz Doran	13 August 2026
3	"Yah!"	Alyssa McClelland	Liz Doran	13 August 2026
4	"To Life!"	Anna Renton	Liz Doran	13 August 2026
5	"One Grand Passion"	Anna Renton	Rachael Turk and Liz Doran	13 August 2026
6	"Ta Ta"	Anna Renton	Liz Doran	13 August 2026

== Production ==
=== Background ===
My Brilliant Career is an historical drama television series based on the 1901 novel My Brilliant Career, by Australian author Miles Franklin. The novel is often on the reading lists in Australian high school curricula, and the 1979 film adaptation by Australian director Gillian Armstrong brought international fame to Judy Davis and Sam Neill, who played Sybylla and Harry.

The longer format of the series allows for the introduction of new characters and subplots, and varies from the original in other ways, for example casting Harry Beecham as a Chinese Australian. There are various other contemporary elements including a gay relationship between men, and an Aboriginal character, Nell, with a family story behind her that shows how racism and colonialism affected people's relationships with each other.

=== Development ===
In June 2025, Netflix ordered the series for six episodes. Liz Doran is the developer and showrunner, whose credits include the Australian comedy series Please Like Me (2013–2016) and 2022 drama series Barons. The writing team includes Doran, Sarinah Masukor, and Rachael Turk, with Shari Sebbens as associate producer.

Alyssa McClelland directs the first three episodes as set-up director, with Anne Renton helming episodes 4–6 and serving as co-producer. It is executive produced by Jungle Entertainment's Chloe Rickard alongside Doran and McClelland. Paul Ranford produces the series, with Courtney Wise as co-executive producer. Key department heads include production designer Felicity Abbott, set-up director of photography Kieran Fowler, costume designer Mariot Kerr, and hair and makeup designer Zeljka Stanin. Marden Dean serves as block two director of photography, with casting by Nikki Barrett in Australia and Nathan Toth in the U.K.

The show's budget is around A$17 million, which is the most ever spent on a TV series made in the state of South Australia.

=== Casting ===
In June 2025, it was announced that Philippa Northeast would lead the cast, joined by Christopher Chung, Anna Chancellor, and Genevieve O'Reilly, with Kate Mulvany, Jake Dunn, Alexander England, Sherry-Lee Watson, and Miah Madden completing the lineup.

=== Filming ===
The series entered production, with filming occurring near Penola, in the South East of South Australia, in June 2025.

The series also filmed at Adelaide Studios and other locations, with the backing of the South Australian Film Corporation, and around 400 local cast and crew working on the series. It is the most expensive television production ever made in South Australia, costing around A$17 million.

The grand home in which Sybylla's grandmother lives, called "Caddagat", was filmed on a property at Penola called Yallum Park. Some of the rooms were recreated at Adelaide Studios, with furniture transported from the property to Adelaide for filming. Yallum Park, an Italianate mansion, was built on a 40-acre (16 ha) property purchased in 1861 by Scottish settler pastoralist John Riddoch (1827–1901) for £30,000. He hosted many notable people at his home, including English novelist Anthony Trollope. The home has 17 rooms, and is elaborately decorated and well-preserved. At the time of filming, it is owned by Andy and Annie Clifford, Andy's grandfather having bought the home from the Riddoch estate in 1914. The home is opened to visitors once a month.

Scenes set at the home of Harry Beecham, "Five Bob Downs", were filmed a property at Gawler called Para Para.

=== Music ===
Jemma Burns served as music supervisor on the series, along with Molly Lewis and François Tétaz. The series also features contemporary music by other artists, such as Kate Miller-Heidke and Thelma Plum. The score was composed by Tétaz and recorded at Synthtemple. It features Lewis whistling and Miller-Heidke on vocals, along with musicians Luke Carbon and Melina van Leeuwen playing a large number of instruments between them, including flute, piccolo, clarinet, oboe, and harp.

== Release ==
On the eve of its worldwide release, a red carpet event in which two episodes were screened was held at the Piccadilly Cinema in North Adelaide, attended by Deputy Premier and Minister for the Arts Kyam Maher, along with delegates from Netflix and the South Australian Film Corporation, local cast members, extras, and crew.

My Brilliant Career received a worldwide release on Netflix on 13 August 2026, broadcasting to 190 countries.

== Reception ==
As of 30 August 2026 the review aggregator website Rotten Tomatoes determined that 100% of 27 critics' reviews were positive, and the average of rated reviews was 8.2 out of 10. The website's critics consensus reads, "Powered by Philippa Northeast's sparkling performance, My Brilliant Career is a joyful, sharp, and refreshingly modern take on a timeless coming-of-age tale." Metacritic, which uses a weighted average, assigned a score of 80 out of 100, based on 10 critics, indicating "generally favorable" reviews.

Lucy Mangan, writing in The Guardian (UK), gave the series 5 out of 5 stars, calling it a "rare and beautiful period drama... [that] crackles with intelligence and wit, gives all of its characters room to breathe... and, without ever becoming superficial, never loses its lightness of touch. A joy. A brilliant, brilliant joy". Luke Buckmaster, of Guardian Australia, gave it 3 out of 5 stars, objecting to its "at times Mills & Boon-ish vibes", but nonetheless concluding that it "still has plenty of pluck and sass, an appealingly messy kind of gusto, and a very entertaining high-voltage performance from Northeast".

Rachael Mead, writing in InDaily, called the series "exuberant, romantic, visually exquisite and deeply engaging", with "exceptional" production values. She praised the performances, in particular Northeast, whom, she wrote, "is the lynchpin of this production's success". She liked the expansion into six episodes, which allowed for additional subplots explored "sexuality, race, ambition, and class".

David Knox of TV Tonight gave the series 4.5 stars out of 5, singling out Northeast's performance for particular praise and calling the show "a triumph". He also praises the supporting actors, Kate Mulvany, Anna Chancellor, Genevieve O'Reilly, and Sherry-Lee Watson, and opines "It is Netflix’s best local contribution since Boy Swallows Universe".

Jasmine Valentine, giving the series 4.5 stars out of 5, wrote on TechRadar: "I'll happily vouch for it being the strongest and most authentic show that Netflix has released across 2026 to date".

On 19 August 2026 the show was #5 on Netflix's top 10 list.

== Soundtrack ==
Two soundtracks were released on the same day, 13 August 2026:

1. A 31-track soundtrack credited to François Tétaz, with many of the tracks featuring Molly Lewis. The score was recorded at Synthtemple, and features Lewis whistling and Kate Miller-Heidke on vocals, along with musicians Luke Carbon and Melina van Leeuwen playing a large number of instruments between them. At the 2026 ARIA Music Awards, it won Best Original Soundtrack or Musical Theatre Cast Album.
2. A 10-track album featuring songs from the series, with the following tracks:

My Brilliant Career (Songs from the Netflix Series) track listing
No.	Title	Writer(s)	Length
1.	"Siren (Never Let You Go)" (by Kate Miller-Heidke)	Bjarne Ohlin	3:42
2.	"Atomic" (by Beckah Amani)	Jimmy Destri; Debbie Harry	4:39
3.	"Horses" (by Kate Miller-Heidke)	Miller-Heidke; Jeremy Blazé; Rose Riebl	3:03
4.	"Young Turks" (by Isabella Manfredi)	Carmine Appice; Duane Hitchings; Kevin Savigar; Rod Stewart	1:39
5.	"Don't Fence Me In" (Amy Hill and Xanthe Waite)	Cole Porter	2:41
6.	"Scarborough Fair" (by Julia Jacklin)	(traditional)	3:30
7.	"The Gypsy and the Bird" (by Isabella Manfredi)	Julius Benedict; Edward Oxenford	2:32
8.	"I Love You Always Forever" (by Thelma Plum)	Donna Lewis	4:17
9.	"Jasmine Lament" (by Rainbow Chan)	Rainbow Chan	1:43
10.	"Dancing in the Moonlight" (by Thelma Plum)	Bunna Lawrie	3:17
Total length:			30:07
