= Bryony Marks =

Australian composer

- Born: c. 1971 (age c. 54)
- Education: University of Melbourne (MA)
- Spouse: Matthew Saville (m. 2003)
- Children: 2 sons

Bryony Marks (born c. 1971) is an Australian composer of film scores and theatre music, for which she has won several awards and been nominated for many others. Among her television credits are Please Like Me and Barracuda, and films include Berlin Syndrome and 2040. She has also composed the music for many of the films directed by her husband, Matthew Saville.

Marks is acclaimed for her hallmark "fascination with music from different cultures and 20th century form" and is sought after for her "classical flair and insider's perspective".

== Early life and education ==
Marks' parents own(ed) a vineyard in Gembrook, in the Dandenongs, near Melbourne in Victoria. She was born around 1971.

She completed a Postgraduate Diploma in Music Composition for Film and Television at the Melbourne Conservatorium of Music, part of University of Melbourne, achieving first class honours. In 2001 she attended the inaugural program for composers at the Australian National Academy of Music, where she studied under Simon Bainbridge and Karen Tanaka.

She first met her future husband, filmmaker Matthew Saville, at the Victorian College of the Arts.

== Career ==
Marks composed music for several stage productions in the 1990s, and in 2004 participated in MODART05, an event hosted by Song Company and the Australian Music Centre.

In September 2007, she composed the music for Saville's opera, Crossing Live. Staged at the Malthouse Theatre in Melbourne, the work won Victorian Green Room Awards in New Operatic Work and Best New Australian Opera Work.

Marks has written the scores for several films and TV series directed by Saville, including his debut feature film, Noise (2007); Felony (2013); Please Like Me; and his 2007 documentary The King: The Story of Graham Kennedy, about Australian entertainer Graham Kennedy. She composed the music for the Chris Lilley series We Can Be Heroes (2005), Summer Heights High (2007), and Angry Boys.

She teamed up with the creator of Please Like Me, Josh Thomas, for the second time, to create the music for his TV series made in the US, Everything's Gonna Be Okay, in 2020–2021. In 2021 Marks released LOCKDOWN Birdsong, featuring Kristian Chong and Erica Kennedy, which reflected on the first Melbourne COVID-19 lockdown. The work was accompanied by a short film showing footage of the surroundings that inspired the music.

Other film and TV credits include:

- Damon Gameau's 2040
- Tori Garrett's 2017 film Don’t Tell
- Cate Shortland's Berlin Syndrome
- Lambs of God
- the ABC miniseries Barracuda, based on the book by Christos Tsiolkas
- The King: The Story of Graham Kennedy, a 2007 documentary directed by Saville

Marks has said:

I am drawn to projects which move me, which speak to the human condition in all its crazy glory. There's no one subject, genre, sub or dominant culture that particularly resonates for me. Rather I would say my favourite projects have shared an element of authenticity, of honesty, expressed in manifold ways.

== Awards ==
Year	Award	Work	Result	Reference
2017	Film Critics Circle of Australia Award Best Original Score	Berlin Syndrome	Won	
2019	9th AACTA Awards Best Original Score in Television	Lambs of God	Won	
2019	9th AACTA Awards Best Original Score in a Documentary	2040	Won	
2019	APRA AMCOS Screen Music Awards Best Music for a Documentary	2040	Nominated	
2019	APRA AMCOS Screen Music Awards Best Soundtrack Album	2040	Nominated	
2019	APRA AMCOS Screen Music Awards Best Music for a Mini-Series or Telemovie	Lambs of God	Nominated	
2020	APRA AMCOS Screen Music Awards Best Music for a Television Series or Serial	Everything's Gonna Be OK	Nominated	
2020	APRA AMCOS Screen Music Awards Best Soundtrack Album	Lambs of God	Nominated	
2026	APRA AMCOS Screen Music Awards Best Music for a Television Comedy	Dog Park (TV series)	Nominated	
2026	APRA AMCOS Screen Music Awards Best Music for a Television Drama	The Family Next Door (TV series)	Nominated	

== Personal life ==
Marks married Australian film director Matthew Saville in 2003 at her parents' vineyard, and they have two sons.
