= Christopher Chung =

Christopher Chung may refer to:

- Christopher Chung (born 1957), Hongkonger politician
- Christopher Chung (born 1988), Australian actor and singer
