= Sarah Roberts (actress) =

Australian television and film actress (born 1984)

- Born: Sarah Kathryn Roberts; 4 December 1984 (age 41); Melbourne, Australia
- Occupation: Actress
- Years active: 2002–present
- Spouse: James Stewart (m. 2019; div. 2024)

Sarah Kathryn Roberts (born 4 December 1984) is an Australian television and film actress. After training at the 16th Street Actors Studio, Roberts took part in the 2012 reality television series Bollywood Star, in which Australians compete for a chance to work with Bollywood director Mahesh Bhatt. She has made guest appearances in various Australian television shows, including Jack Irish and INXS: Never Tear Us Apart. After appearing in the 2014 Neighbours spin-off series Brennan on the Run as Sienna Matthews, Roberts joined the cast of the main show in a recurring capacity. From 2017 to 2021, she played Willow Harris in Home and Away. Roberts has also starred in the feature films Felony and UnIndian.

== Early life and education ==
Sarah Kathryn Roberts was born on 4 December 1984. She is of Sri Lankan heritage.

After graduating from high school, Roberts moved to China to teach English. She then moved to Tokyo when she was 18 and secured the role of Princess Jasmine at the Tokyo Disneyland production of Aladdin. Three years later, Roberts returned to Australia. She trained at the 16th Street Actors Studio in Melbourne.

== Career ==
Roberts was a contestant on the 2012 SBS reality television series Bollywood Star, in which Australians competed for the chance to appear in a Bollywood film by director Mahesh Bhatt. She made it to the top four. Shortly after the show finished, Roberts auditioned for Matthew Saville's crime thriller Felony. Roberts attended three auditions in total, and after the final one in Sydney, she was convinced that she would not receive the role. Two weeks later, Roberts was informed that she had been cast as Ankhila, the mother of a young boy who is killed in a hit and run. Felony was written by Joel Edgerton, who also stars in the lead role, and it premiered at the 2013 Toronto Film Festival.

Roberts was also cast in a production of Alan Ball's play All That I Will Ever Be by director Robert Chuter in 2012. She portrayed the two female roles of Cynthia and Beth. Roberts has had guest stints in several Australian television shows and films, including It's a Date, Angry Boys and Wolf Creek 2. She also appears in the Jack Irish television film series, and the INXS: Never Tear Us Apart miniseries.

In 2014, Roberts appeared in the Neighbours web series Brennan on the Run as Sienna Matthews, the girlfriend of Mark Brennan (Scott McGregor), a former police detective in witness protection. Later that year, Roberts reprised her role of Sienna and joined the cast of Neighbours in a recurring capacity. Roberts received hate mail during her time in the show, as viewers did not like her character. She had previously made one off guest appearances in Neighbours during 2010 and 2011.

In late 2014, Roberts was cast in the romantic comedy UnIndian. It was the first feature film from the Australia India Film Fund established the previous year. Roberts stars alongside Tannishtha Chatterjee and former cricketer Brett Lee. Roberts joined the cast of Home and Away in 2017 as Willow Harris. She flew up from Melbourne to Sydney for the audition, where she had a chemistry reading with actor James Stewart, who plays Justin Morgan. She had originally auditioned for the roles of Kat Chapman and Scarlett Snow. Roberts described Willow as "a tough, dynamic and powerful character". In March 2021, Roberts confirmed that she had quit Home and Away and was auditioning for new roles. Her final scenes aired on 14 April 2021.

After leaving Home and Away, Roberts appeared in the 2022 comedy film Wog Boys Forever, written by Nick Giannopoulos. On 5 June 2024, Roberts was confirmed to be reprising her role of Beth Ramachandran for the second season of Scrublands. She also appears in the film adaption of Craig Silvey's novel Runt, and an episode of the ABC series Return to Paradise.

In April 2026, Roberts alongside Sam Frost started their podcast series Cracking On.

== Personal life ==
In addition to her acting career, Roberts is also a DJ and plays with singer Kate Greer in a duo called VAMP. Their first single "Neon Lights" features rapper Eve.

Roberts began a relationship with her Home and Away co-star James Stewart since October 2017. They announced their engagement in December 2018, and married at Luttrellstown Castle in Ireland in July 2019. Roberts is stepmother to Stewart's daughter Scout from his relationship with Jessica Marais. On 20 April 2024, Roberts announced that she and Stewart had divorced five weeks prior after an amicable break-up.

On 23 October 2019, Roberts' brother Karl died of brain cancer.

== Filmography ==
=== Film ===
Year	Title	Role	Notes
2012	151 Kent Ave	Girlfriend	
2012	1000 Dollar Doubt	Hostage 2	Short
2013	Wolf Creek 2	English Girl #1	
2013	Felony	Ankhila Sarduka	
2013	Good Boy	Receptionist	Short
2015	UnIndian	Priya	
2018	Your Call Is Important to Us	Desdemona	Short
2018	Straight Talk Express	Clara	Short
2020	After the End	Isabella	
2022	Wog Boys Forever	Cleo	
2024	Runt	Gretel Patel	
2024	Make It Look Real	Herself	

=== Television ===
Year	Title	Role	Notes
2010	Neighbours	Clare Henderson	Episode 6018 (season 26)
2011	Angry Boys	Baby Elephant	Season 1, episode 2
2011	Neighbours	Jess Walker	Episode 6279 (season 27)
2012	Jack Irish: Bad Debts	Lorna	TV film
2012	Flat Whites	Courtney	Episode: "Wingman Down"
2013	It's a Date	Mexigogo Waitress	Episode: "When Should You Abandon a Date?"
2014	Brennan on the Run	Sienna Matthews	Episodes: "Intervene", "First Date", "Run", "The Fight"
2014	INXS: Never Tear Us Apart	Shelley	TV miniseries
2014	Nowhere Boys	Reporter 1	Episode: "2.1"
2014	Neighbours	Sienna Matthews	Recurring role
2015	Footballer Wants a Wife	Becky	Episode: "Pack Date"
2017	Method	Katrina	Episode: "Hungry"
2017–2021	Home and Away	Willow Harris	Series regular
2023	Wolf Like Me	Tara	Episode: "2.1"
2023–present	Scrublands	Beth Ramachandran	TV series: 7 episodes
2024	Colin From Accounts	Siobhan	Episode: "Wawam"
2024	Return to Paradise	Priya Ogden	Episode: "Oh Mine Papa"
