= Pivot (TV network) =

Defunct American television network

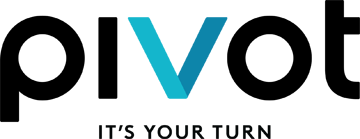
- Country: United States
- Broadcast area: United States
- Headquarters: Los Angeles, California

Programming
- Language: English

Ownership
- Owner: Participant Media

History
- Launched: August 1, 2013
- Replaced: Halogen TV; Documentary Channel
- Closed: October 31, 2016

Pivot was an American digital cable and satellite television network owned by Participant Media that aired programming that focused on social issues and activism. The channel, targeted at young adults between 18 and 34 years old, debuted on August 1, 2013. The channel ceased all operations on October 31, 2016.

== History ==
In December 2012, Participant Media acquired Halogen TV and the Documentary Channel. On March 27, 2013, it was announced that these channels would merge into a single channel, launching Pivot, described as a "disruptive TV" service, Pivot would focus on social advocacy. The channel would air on the space held by the aforementioned channels, giving Pivot an initial subscriber base of about 40 million cable and satellite television homes. The channel launched on August 1, 2013, at 6 a.m. with a rendition of the song that launched MTV 32 years earlier on August 1, 1981, "Video Killed the Radio Star" by The Buggles, by several indie music artists, followed by a brief introduction to Pivot by Participant Media founder Jeffrey Skoll, and the first program, the 2010 documentary ReGeneration.

With the launch, Pivot became the first television channel to offer broadband-only subscriptions that allows live streaming of the linear channel and video on demand offerings without requiring a subscription to a pay television service. It was later announced that NeuLion had been selected to design and deliver the new cable network's downloadable interactive app which allows Pivot's content to be delivered to multiple digital devices. It offered its entertainment programming, live and on-demand, to authenticated pay TV subscribers and broadband-only subscribers.

=== Closure ===
On August 17, 2016, Participant Media announced that the channel would close by early 2017, citing low ratings, small viewing audiences, and an overall discontinuation of producing television shows by Participant under current CEO David Linde; the channel's shut date was later confirmed to be on October 31. The channel officially closed at 6 a.m. EDT that morning; the last programs to air on the network were five consecutive airings of the film Good Night, and Good Luck starting at 8 p.m. on October 30 onward until the closure (the film choice was likely a nod to the final words spoken on one of Pivot's predecessors, Documentary Channel). During the split-screen credits of the last airing of the film on the channel, a commercial was shown showing the network's three-year history and thanking its viewers for watching (having been run over the last few weeks of the channel's broadcast) in place of a sign-off message; afterwards, the channel merely faded to black after the end of the film, shortly after replaced with a slide from the cable services notifying viewers of the closure.

== Programming ==
Programming seen on Pivot included original programs such as HitRecord on TV, a variety show hosted by series co-creator Joseph Gordon-Levitt, and the reality-based talk show Raising McCain, hosted by blogger and television host Meghan McCain. Will, a period drama about a young William Shakespeare, was also announced when the channel launched, but was mostly halted throughout the channel's run. The show ultimately aired one season on TNT in 2017. Pivot was also the American television home of the Australian comedy-drama Please Like Me, a show created and written by Josh Thomas, which had been co-produced by Pivot and the Australian Broadcasting Corporation for the second season.

Other shows include Jersey Strong, a docusoap that chronicles the lives of two families from parallel universes, the late night current events talk show TakePart Live, hosted by Jacob Soboroff. Pivot also aired the anime series, C-Control, which premiered on October 5, 2013. It was Pivot's only anime program, but the series originally premiered in America on the Funimation Channel in January 2013. On January 29, 2015, Pivot premiered the UK series, Fortitude, on the same date as Sky Atlantic.

In 2014, Pivot premiered Human Resources, a reality television series providing a behind-the-scenes and at times humorous look at day-to-day operations at TerraCycle headquarters.

Other programs seen on the channel included acquired shows such as Buffy the Vampire Slayer, Farscape, Friday Night Lights, Little Mosque on the Prairie, The Operatives, Veronica Mars, and live programs and documentaries produced in partnership with Rolling Stone and Noticias Univision.
