= Carla Cametti PD =

- Created by: Jo Martino; Samantha Winston
- Written by: Jo Martino; Samantha Winston; Kris Mrksa; Liz Doran
- Directed by: Ian Watson
- Starring: Diana Glenn; Vince Colosimo
- Composers: Cezary and Jan Skubiszewski
- Country of origin: Australia
- No. of seasons: 1
- No. of episodes: 6

Production
- Executive producer: Ewan Burnett
- Producers: Elisa Argenzio; Cristina Pozzan
- Production locations: Melbourne, Victoria
- Running time: 48 minutes
- Production company: Buon Giorno Productions

Original release
- Network: SBS TV
- Release: 8 January – 12 February 2009

Carla Cametti PD is a six-part Australian television crime series that was announced in April 2008 and first screened on SBS TV on 8 January 2009. The series of six episodes was produced by Buon Giorno Productions Pty Ltd.

The show revolves around a young female Italian-Australian private detective named Carla Cametti who is investigating her own mafia family. Carla is played by Diana Glenn.

The DVD has been released in Region 4 only.

== Cast ==
=== Main ===
- Diana Glenn as Carla Cametti PD
- Vince Colosimo as Senior Detective Luciano Gandolfi
- Nicole da Silva as Lisa Testro
- Robert Mammone as Tony Cametti
- Sullivan Stapleton as Matt Brodie
- Daniella Farinacci as Teresa Cametti
- Dina Panozzo as Angela Cametti
- Alfredo Malabello as Leo Cametti
- Tony Poli as Joe Testro
- Jude Beaumont as Amanda Cartlin
- Christine Kaman as Nonna
- Julie Eckersley as Georgina Kavel

=== Guests ===
- Angus Grant as Brad Greene
- Jared Daperis as Jonno Carroll
- Christine Keogh as Bev
- Matt Boesenberg as hitman Sean Hamley
- Maureen Edwards as Ruth Fenley
- Roz Hammond as Sandra DeLuca
- Adam Zwar as Hank
- Terry Camilleri as Mr Tinti
- Luke Hemsworth as Electrician
- Scott McGregor as Barman
- Isabella Dunwill
- Alfredo Malabello

== Episodes ==
| No. in season | Title | Directed by | Written by | Original Aus. air date | Aus. viewers |
|---|---|---|---|---|---|
| 1 | "To Have and to Hold" | Ian Watson | Jo Martino & Samantha Winston | 8 January 2009 | 457,000 |
| 2 | "For Better, For Worse" | Ian Watson | Samantha Winston | 15 January 2009 | 366,000 |
| 3 | "For Richer, For Poorer" | Ian Watson | Liz Doran | 22 January 2009 | 344,000 |
| 4 | "In Sickness and in Health" | Ian Watson | Kris Mrksa | 29 January 2009 | 267,000 |
| 5 | "Love, Honour, and Cherish" | Ian Watson | Samantha Winston & Liz Doran | 5 February 2009 | 296,000 |
| 6 | "Till Death Do Us Part" | Ian Watson | Jo Martino & Kris Mrksa | 12 February 2009 | 311,000 |
