= Dog Park (TV series) =

- Genre: Comedy drama
- Created by: Leon Ford; Amanda Higgs
- Directed by: Nina Buxton; Matthew Saville
- Starring: Leon Ford; Celia Pacquola; Grace Chow; Ras-Samuel; Elizabeth Alexander
- Country of origin: Australia
- Original language: English
- No. of episodes: 6

Production
- Production company: Matchbox Pictures

Original release
- Network: ABC Television
- Release: 1 February 2026

Dog Park is an Australian dramatic comedy TV series made for ABC Television, released on 1 February 2026. Produced by Matchbox Pictures, the series focuses on Roland, who in the grip of a midlife crisis joins a group of dog owners in the local park.

At the 2026 Screen Music Awards, music by Bryony Marks was nominated for Best Music for a Television Comedy.

== Plot ==
Roland, in the midst of a midlife crisis, meets a group of dog owners whom he gradually starts to befriend as he realises that he has found the people he needs to be with.

== Cast ==
- Leon Ford as Roland
- Elizabeth Alexander as Penny
- Celia Pacquola as Samantha
- Brooke Satchwell as Emma
- Grace Chow as Pamelia
- Ras-Samuel as Jonah

== Episodes ==
=== Series overview ===
| Series | Episodes | Originally released | |
| Series | Episodes | First released | Last released |
|---|---|---|---|
| 1 | 6 | 1 February 2026 | 8 March 2026 |

== Production ==
On 9 September 2025, ABC announced that the series was in production, filming in and around Melbourne, with funding secured from Screen Australia in association with VicScreen. The series was created by Leon Ford and Amanda Higgs, and directed by Matthew Saville and Nina Buxton.

On 5 December 2025, ABC released the trailer.

The series airs from 1 February 2026.

== Reception ==
Clare Rigden of Screen Queen TV, wrote that the series was beautifully written and great if you love dogs.

David Knox of TV Tonight rated the series three stars, saying the draw to the show was the dogs bringing joy.
