= Alfredo Malabello =

Australian singer

- Born: 11 December 1959 (age 65); Adelaide, Australia
- Origin: Australia
- Occupations: Singer; songwriter; actor
- Instrument: Vocals
- Years active: 1980–present
- Labels: SBS, UMA

Alfredo Malabello (born 11 December 1959) is an Australian singer and actor, who released two studio albums and whose acting credits include the SBS series, Carla Cametti PD (2008), Nine Network's Underbelly Files (2011) and Seven Network's The Secret Daughter (2016).

== Life and career ==
Alfredo Malabello was born 11 December 1959, at The Queen Elizabeth Hospital, Adelaide in and grew up in Norwood, South Australia. He went to private colleges and studied at the Institute of Technology and attained an electronics degree and electromechanics and physics.

In 1980, Malabello formed a band called The Rhythms. The Rhythms supported The Cure on their first tour of Australia and toured around Australia for four years before breaking up.

In 1988, Malabello travelled the world with his musical partner and signed a deal with Polygram in Tokyo, Japan. They relocated to New York and then Nashville, Tennessee, for one year and recorded an album.

In 2010, Malabello released his debut solo album, Ciao Bella which peaked at number 83 on the ARIA Charts. In 2011, Malabello said "I was pleasantly surprised with the success of Ciao Bella, and I'm thrilled I'm able to connect with so many people."

This was followed by The Two of Us in 2011, self-described as "a fun introduction, a seduction, a courtship, foreplay, right through some slow whisper pillow talk."

== Discography ==
=== Albums ===
List of albums, with selected chart positions
Title	Album details	Peak chart positions
Title	Album details	AUS
Ciao Bella	Released: April 2010; Format: CD; Label: SBS, Universal (2735574)	83
The Two of Us	Released: 2011; Format: CD; Label: SBS, Universal	—
