= Barons (TV series) =

2022 Australian drama series

- Genre: Drama
- Created by: Michael Lawrence; John Molloy; Liz Doran
- Written by: Liz Doran; Matt Cameron; Marieke Hardy
- Country of origin: Australia
- Original language: English
- No. of series: 1
- No. of episodes: 8

Production
- Producers: John Molloy; Michael Lawrence; Justin Davies
- Running time: 60 minutes
- Production companies: Fremantle Australia; Micanical Media; 2Jons

Original release
- Network: ABC
- Release: 24 April – 12 June 2022

Barons is an Australian television drama series on the ABC which aired from 24 April to 12 June 2022.

== Synopsis ==
The series parallels the story behind the Billabong and Quiksilver surf labels, in which Australian surfers in the 1970s turned their personal rivalries into professional rivalries as they built competing surfwear companies.

== Cast ==
=== Main / regular ===
- Sean Keenan as Bill 'Trotter' Dwyer
- Ben O'Toole as Snapper Webster
- Jillian Nguyen as Tracy Dwyer
- Hunter Page-Lochard as Reg Thompson
- George Pullar as Bernie Hunter Jr
- Lincoln Younes as Buddy Fraser
- Sophia Forrest as Dani Kirk
- Vivienne Awosoga as Marguax Dupont
- Nicholas Burton as Tom 'Sharpie' Sharp
- Karina Banno as Jules Zemanik
- Megan MacKenzie as Kelly Fox
- Kick Gurry as Mac
- Catherine Van-Davies as Shirley Kwong
- Alexander England as Arthur Foreman
- Ione Skye as Marilyn Hunter
- Sandy Winton as Bernie Hunter Sr
- Sebastian Tang as Dimma
- Hafedh Dakhlaoui as Carlito
- Meg Fraser as Cindy Carroway
- Rupert Reid as Hayden

=== Guests ===
- John Batchelor as Bruce Hewitt

== Episodes ==
No.	Title	Directed by	Written by	Original release date	Australian viewers
1	"Episode 1"	Shawn Seet	Liz Doran	24 April 2022	186,000
2	"Episode 2"	Shawn Seet	Liz Doran	1 May 2022	148,000
3	"Episode 3"	Shawn Seet	Matt Cameron	8 May 2022	133,000
4	"Episode 4"	Fadia Abboud	Marieke Hardy	15 May 2022	144,000
5	"Episode 5"	Fadia Abboud	Matt Cameron	22 May 2022	118,000
6	"Episode 6"	Fadia Abboud	Liz Doran	29 May 2022	115,000
7	"Episode 7"	Shawn Seet	Liz Doran	5 June 2022	115,000
8	"Episode 8"	Shawn Seet	Liz Doran	12 June 2022	101,000

== Production ==
The series was created by Michael Lawrence, John Molloy and Liz Doran, who also produced it alongside Justin Davies. The series is a joint production of Fremantle Australia, Micanical Media and 2Jons. The writing team was led by Doran, with Matt Cameron and Marieke Hardy co-writing.

Five seasons for the show were planned. It was announced in June 2019 after a development deal was secured with ABC and the first season was greenlit in April 2021.

The series was filmed in Australia in the second quarter of 2021. The crew had planned to film in the United States and Indonesia as well, but were forced to cancel it due to COVID-19 pandemic restrictions barring travel. Taylor Steele directed the surfing scenes as the second unit director.

== International broadcast ==
In the United States, the series premiered on 29 May 2023 on The CW. On 21 June 2023, the series was pulled from the network's schedule after four episodes.
