= Prosper (TV series) =

2024 Australian TV series

- Genre: Drama
- Created by: Matt Cameron; Jason Stephens
- Written by: Matt Cameron; Belinda Chayko; Liz Doran; Louise Fox
- Directed by: Jennifer Lacey; Shaun Wilson
- Starring: Richard Roxburgh; Rebecca Gibney; Ewen Leslie
- Composers: Amanda Brown; Antonio Gambale
- Country of origin: Australia
- Original language: English
- No. of series: 1
- No. of episodes: 8

Production
- Executive producers: Helen Bowden; Matt Cameron; Amanda Duthie; Cailah Scobie
- Producers: Jason Stevens; Andrew Walker
- Production locations: Sydney, New South Wales; Sydney Coliseum Theatre in Rooty Hill
- Editors: Nicole La Macchia; Adrian Rostirolla
- Running time: 46 minutes
- Production companies: Lingo Pictures; Lionsgate Television

Original release
- Network: Stan
- Release: 28 January 2024

Prosper is an Australian television drama series, released on Stan on 18 January 2024. Created by Matt Cameron and Jason Stephens, the series follows the family of the U Star megachurch. It stars Richard Roxburgh, Rebecca Gibney, and Ewen Leslie.

== Premise ==
Cal Quinn, the pastor of the U Star megachurch, announces a bold plan to expand the church into the United States, to the surprise of his family. After the suicide of a member of the congregation, Cal's wife Abi stands by him, as other family secrets emerge.

== Cast and characters ==
=== Main ===
- Richard Roxburgh as Cal Quinn
- Rebecca Gibney as Abi Quinn
- Ewen Leslie as Dion Quinn
- Jacob Collins-Levy as Jed Quinn
- Ming-Zhu Hii as Taz Quinn
- Hayley McCarthy as Issy Kalani
- Jordi Webber as Benji Kalani
- Andrea Solonge as Juno Adebayo
- Alexander D'Souza as Moses Quinn
- Alex Fitzalan as Maddox
- Brigid Zengeni as Rosa Adebayo
- Jacek Koman as Eli Slowik

=== Supporting ===
- Christopher James Baker as Mitch Leeway
- Holly Leonard as Bethany Quinn
- Nikki Shiels as Kasey Leeway
- Renee Lim as Jackie
- Fayssal Bazzi as Samir Maalouf
- Victoria Haralabidou as Selene Karras
- Arka Das as Ravi

== Production ==
Prosper was commissioned by Stan and Lionsgate as a Stan Original production, with major investment from Screen Australia and additional support from Screen NSW. It was co-written by Matt Cameron (who also executive produced), Liz Doran, Louise Fox, and Belinda Chayko.

The location used for the U Star church was the Sydney Coliseum in Rooty Hill.

== Episodes ==
No.	Title	Directed by	Written by	Original release date
1	"Man of God"	Jennifer Leacey	Matt Cameron	18 January 2024
2	"Glossolalia"	Jennifer Leacey	Liz Doran	18 January 2024
3	"Charity Begins At Home"	Jennifer Leacey	Liz Doran & Louise Fox	18 January 2024
4	"Signs and Wonders"	Jennifer Leacey	Belinda Chayko	18 January 2024
5	"Love Offerings"	Shaun Wilson	Matt Cameron	18 January 2024
6	"Gethsemane"	Shaun Wilson	Belinda Chayko	18 January 2024
7	"Broken Covenants"	Shaun Wilson	Belinda Chayko	18 January 2024
8	"The Promised Land"	Shaun Wilson	Matt Cameron	18 January 2024

== Release ==
The full series was released on 18 January 2024.

== Reception ==
Luke Buckmaster, The Guardian Australia's film critic gave the series 4 stars: "Prosper brings religious-themed Australian dramas such as The Devil's Playground and Brides of Christ thundering into the modern world: a racy and pacy concoction for a more cynical and secular time."

David Knox of TV Tonight rated the series 3 1/2 stars, citing that not many of the characters in the show were likeable, and it felt cold due to the lack of colour. However he said that the series had a lot of potential.

Anthony Morris of ScreenHub rated the series 4 stars, stating that Roxburgh was completely convincing as Cal.
