= Renee Lim =

Australian actress (born c. 1978)

- Born: Renee Li-Yen Lim c. 1978–1979; Perth, Australia
- Occupations: Actress; TV presenter; Doctor
- Years active: 2003–present

Renee Li-Yen Lim (born c. 1978–1979) is an Australian actress, television presenter, and medical doctor. She is best known for her roles as Constable Jung Lim in East West 101 (2007–2011), Mae in Please Like Me (2013–2016) and her recurring role as Vivienne Hart in The Secret Daughter (2016–2017).

== Early life and education ==
Lim was born in Perth, Western Australia to Chinese-Malaysian parents who had migrated from Malaysia to Australia in the 1970s. When she was five years old, her parents divorced. Lim was primarily raised by her single father. Her mother moved to Malaysia and remarried, with a Peranakan man. Lim would often travel to Malaysia, where she had family other than her mother, to visit her mother. Lim's father later also remarried, and had a son with his new wife when she was 12 years old.

Lim graduated as the dux of her high school Hampton Senior High School. Few from Lim's high school pursued tertiary studies, and she had initially intended to "be a doctor on weekdays, a lawyer on weekends, an actor on the holidays and a dancer at night".

At 17 years old, Lim moved to Sydney, New South Wales to commence medical studies at the University of New South Wales, graduating with a Bachelor of Medicine, Bachelor of Surgery in 2001.

In 2000, Lim co-directed the University of New South Wales Medical Revue, American Booty (an homage to the 1999 film American Beauty), alongside Keith Lim and Jason Appleby. Also during her university studies, Lim co-authored two academic articles.

== Career ==
=== Medical career ===
Lim is a physician, mostly working in part-time, locum posts in emergency medicine, geriatrics, and palliative care departments, and a clinical lecturer at the University of Sydney's Northern Clinical School. She is the Director of Programs at the Pam McLean Centre, an organisation that develops communication training for medical professionals.

Lim considered leaving medical practice altogether to focus on acting; however, she realised that she "love[d] it", adding that "acting is now my job opposed to my hobby".

=== Entertainment career ===
As an actor, Lim made ten guest appearances on the Australian hospital drama All Saints as Suzi Lau, and appeared as a regular cast member on SBS's police drama East West 101 as Jung Lim. Lim played Mae, the younger Thai girlfriend of Josh's father, in Please Like Me, and starred in Forget Me Not in 2014, and in The Secret Daughter, Wonderland and Pulse in 2016.

As a presenter she has appeared on the ABC's Ask The Doctors, and on Food Investigators and Destination Flavour.

Lim creates content for Nay In The Life, a multi-platform project that combines video, theatre and written content centred around well-being and personal development.

== Filmography ==
=== Film ===
Year	Title	Role	Notes
2011	The Tunnel	Lisa Lung	
2012	Dead Moon Circus	Rei Hino / Sailor Mars	
2013	Dead Moon Circus 2	Rei Hino / Sailor Mars	
2014	Ad Nauseam	Chlorine	
2014	Forget Me Not	Jennifer	
2019	Palm Beach	Doctor Hall	
2019	Fragmentary	Rita Mackenzie	
2020	Never Too Late	Lin	
2020	The Invisible Man	Doctor Lee	
2020	The Dry	Sandra Whitlam	
2021	Sydney Stories	Call Girl	
2022	Dark Noise	Dr. Jill Croker	
2024	Five Blind Dates	Jing	

=== Television ===
Year	Title	Role	Notes
2003	White Collar Blue	Housekeeper	Episode #2.22
2007–2011	East West 101	Jung Lim	Main role
2008–2009	All Saints	Suzi Lau	Regular role
2010	Packed to the Rafters	Anh	Episode: "Out of the Comfort Zone"
2011	Crownies	Det. Karen Liu	Recurring role
2012	The Newtown Girls	Alex	Regular role
2013–2014, 2024	Atomic Kingdom	Verity Long / Jade Long	8 episodes
2013–2016	Please Like Me	Mae	Main role
2014–2015	Wonderland	Song Luu	Recurring role
2015	Plonk	Lucy	Episode: "Barossa"
2016	The Weekend Shift	Emily	TV series
2016	Deep Water	Det. Ginger	Miniseries, 4 episodes
2016–2017	The Secret Daughter	Vivienne Hart	11 episodes
2017	Pulse	Monica Lee	8 episodes
2017–2023	Little J & Big Cuz	Ms. Chen	46 episodes
2018	Bite Club	Olivia	Episode #1.6
2018	Rake	Tina	Episode: "Gold and Greene v Red"
2019	Secret City	Helen Wu	4 episodes
2019	Diary of an Uber Driver	Tess	Episode #1.2
2019	Preacher	TV Anchor	2 episodes
2019–2020	Reckoning	Marcy	5 episodes
2021	The Unusual Suspects	Detective Lim	Miniseries, 3 episodes
2021	Clickbait	Alice	Miniseries, 4 episodes
2021	Fires	Fiona Rocca	Episode #1.2
2022	The Tourist	Marnie Brown	2 episodes
2022	Bali 2002	Joy Fong	4 episodes
2022–2023	The PM's Daughter	Deputy Principal Tan	6 episodes
2022–present	Black Snow	Senior Sergeant Angie Zang	5 episodes
2023	The Lost Flowers of Alice Hart	Stella	3 episodes
2024	Prosper	Jackie	3 episodes
