= Halogen TV =

American TV channel

- Country: United States
- Headquarters: Charlotte, North Carolina

Programming
- Language: English
- Picture format: 1080i (HDTV); 480i (SDTV)

Ownership
- Owner: The Inspiration Networks (2009-2012); Participant Media (2012-2013)

History
- Launched: October 24, 2009; 16 years ago
- Replaced: i-Lifetv
- Closed: August 1, 2013; 13 years ago
- Replaced by: Pivot

Links
- Website: www.halogentv.com

Halogen TV was an American digital cable and satellite television channel that aired feature-length films, documentaries, short films, and original reality programs that centered on making positive social changes and making the world a better place.

In December 2012, Halogen, along with the Documentary Channel, was acquired by Participant Media and re-branded as Pivot, a channel aimed at young adults between 18 and 34 years old. The combined channel debuted on August 1, 2013. Pivot ceased operations on October 31, 2016 folding the former Halogen TV channel space.

== Programming ==
=== Former ===
- Angry Planet
- Art Race
- Behind the Label
- Boardfree
- Departures
- Extreme Dreams
- Fink
- Food Jammers
- Glutton for Punishment
- Invisible Children
- Jump Shipp (Original)
- Noble Exchange (Original)
- Penny Revolution
- ReGenesis
- Serve the City
- Tainted Love (Original)
- The Un-Road Trip
