= Make It Look Real =

2024 Australian documentary film directed by Kate Blackmore

- Official poster
- Directed by: Kate Blackmore
- Written by: Kate Blackmore
- Produced by: Bethany Bruce; Daniel Joyce
- Starring: Claire Warden
- Cinematography: Justine Kerrigan
- Edited by: Elliott Magen
- Music by: Benjamin Speed
- Production companies: Staple Fiction; Projector Films
- Distributed by: Bonsai Films (Australia)
- Release date: 2024
- Running time: 78 minutes
- Country: Australia
- Language: English

Make It Look Real is a 2024 Australian documentary film directed by Kate Blackmore. The film follows intimacy coordinator Claire Warden during the staging of simulated sex scenes for a fictional film production, examining consent, boundaries, and professional practice in screen intimacy coordination. It combines observational documentary footage with staged sequences created for the production.

The film premiered at the Adelaide Film Festival in October 2024 and subsequently screened at the South by Southwest Film & TV Festival and the Sydney Film Festival. It received critical attention from international outlets for its depiction of intimacy coordination as a standardised on-set practice. Variety noted the film's detailed observation of Warden's work and its emphasis on choreography, communication and performer safety. Jezebel described the documentary as a procedural examination of the role and its increasing visibility within the film industry.

== Synopsis ==
Intimacy coordinator Claire Warden collaborates with a director and performers on the fictional film Tightrope to choreograph intimate scenes and negotiate consent and boundaries, including discussions around nudity agreements and modesty garments. The documentary incorporates behind-the-scenes process footage alongside staged sequences developed specifically for the production.

== Participants ==
- Claire Warden – intimacy coordinator
- Sarah Roberts – actor
- Albert Mwangi – actor
- Tom Davis – actor
- Kieran Darcy-Smith – actor and director

== Production ==
Make It Look Real is Blackmore's feature-length documentary debut. It was produced by Bethany Bruce and Daniel Joyce for Staple Fiction and Projector Films, with support from Screen Australia, Screen NSW and the Adelaide Film Festival Investment Fund. According to Bruce, the filmmakers were unable to film on an active set and instead created a controlled environment in which to stage and document intimacy coordination practices.

== Release ==
The film had its world premiere at the Adelaide Film Festival in October 2024. It later screened at the South by Southwest Film & TV Festival in 2025 and the Sydney Film Festival in June 2025.

=== Streaming ===
In Australia, the film was released on Netflix in July 2025.

== Reception ==
Critical response focused on the film's depiction of intimacy coordination as an emerging standard practice within screen production. Reviewing the film at SXSW, RogerEbert.com argued that the documentary presents intimacy coordinators as a necessary counterpart to established on-set safety roles. KT of fyrpodcast rated the documentary 4 stars out of 5 and "praised the clear, respectful approach to topics often handled clumsily in the industry, underscoring the ongoing need for sensitivity and care on set." Erik Childress of Movie Madness Podcast rated 3 stars out of 5.
