= The Tailings =

2021 Australian television series

- Written by: Caitlin Richardson
- Directed by: Stevie Cruz-Martin
- Starring: Tegan Stimson; Mabel Li
- Composer: Helena Czajka
- Country of origin: Australia
- Original language: English
- No. of seasons: 1
- No. of episodes: 6

Production
- Executive producers: Ryan Chanatry; John Molloy
- Producers: Liz Doran; Richard Kelly; Stephen Thomas
- Cinematography: Ashley Barron
- Editor: Grace Eyre
- Running time: 10 minutes

Original release
- Network: SBS
- Release: 2 April 2021

The Tailings is an Australian murder mystery television series set in Tasmania. It takes place over 6 ten minute episodes.

== Synopsis ==
Jas's father dies while fishing and she suspects foul play.

== Cast ==
- Tegan Stimson as Jas
- Mabel Li as Ruby
- Kris McQuade as Laurie
- Shaun Martindale as Brendan
- Victoria Haralabidou as Sharon
- Harry Prior as Toby
- Michael Earnshaw as Frank
- Sara Cooper as Nadia Mazzarelli
- Harry Radbone as Leo Mazzarelli
- Jane Hamilton-Foster as Lisa
- John Xintavelonis as Dom Mazzarelli
- Nic English as Shaun
- Tai Nguyen as Marce
- Nadira Farid as Ange
- Eric Harris as Skater
- Emma Lapham as Taneisha
- Joel Cumming as Joel

== Production ==
The Tailings was filmed in Queenstown using one camera. After being delayed due to COVID-19 filming started in October 2020. It was created with assistance from Screen Tasmania.

== Reception ==
Luke Buckmaster of NME gave it gave it a mostly positive review but states "after such a measured build-up, the ending feels a little abrupt and unsatisfying."

== Awards ==
- 11th AACTA Awards
  - Best Short Form Drama - winner
