= Sunshine (Australian TV series) =

Australian television series

- Genre: Crime, drama
- Written by: Matt Cameron; Elise McCredie
- Directed by: Daina Reid
- Starring: Anthony LaPaglia; Melanie Lynskey
- Country of origin: Australia
- Original language: English
- No. of seasons: 1
- No. of episodes: 4

Production
- Producers: Ian Collie; Anna McLeish; Sarah Shaw
- Running time: 60 minutes
- Production company: Essential Media

Original release
- Network: SBS
- Release: 18 October – 26 October 2017

Sunshine (released internationally as Sunshine Kings) is an Australian crime drama series which debuted on SBS on 18 October 2017. The four-part miniseries is an Essential Media production, directed by Daina Reid and written by Matt Cameron and Elise McCredie.

== Plot ==
Sunshine is based in Melbourne's inner–western suburb of Sunshine and its surrounds. The story follows Jacob Garang, a young, aspiring South Sudanese-Australian basketballer who is on the cusp of being picked up by scouts for US college teams. He becomes a chief suspect in a police investigation involving a 15-year-old girl, found seriously injured in one of Melbourne's more affluent suburbs.

A second strand in the story concerns Eddie (LaPaglia), owner of the sports shop, who is persuaded to take over coaching duties of the Sunshine Kings basketball team from the earnest but ineffectual parson Skelton (Gyngell). Under new management the team becomes successful and Eddie becomes accepted by the Sudanese community who are the backbone of team. A serious incident in his racist past comes to light and they feel betrayed, resulting in an irreparable loss of trust.

A third strand is the efforts of lawyer Zara Skelton (Lynskey), daughter of the parson, to divert the police from treating the Sudanese as suspects, and eventually helps them discover the truth.

== Cast ==
- Anthony LaPaglia as Eddie
- Melanie Lynskey as Zara Skelton
- Wally Elnour as Jacob Garang
- Ror da Poet as Deng Deng
- Autiak Aweteek as Santino Dut
- Nick Perry as Dazzler
- Ana Boal as Mari Garang
- Jufia Ajobong as Grace Garang
- Tiarnie Coupland as Elly Messina
- Kim Gyngell as Rev. Neil 'The Peacock' Skelton
- Jane Bayly as Pat Skelton
- Nyandeng Makuer as Alek Deng
- Kor Puoc as Manute Deng
- Paul Ireland as DSS Ian Sloane
- Leah Vandenberg as DSC Jaya Prasad
- Piath Mcathiang as Nyagua Nyawan
- Vince Colosimo as Tony Messina
- Freya Stafford as Freya Messina
- Rupert Reid as Ben Canny
- Kyle Eliott as Vlad Cilic
- Emmanuel Martin Malou as Lam Bol
- Zhong Duo (Andy) Xia as Mike Wong
- Arec Athum as Ayei
- Anyuop Dau as Darna
- Ben Klarenaar as Larry Grattan
- Trudy Hellier as Jackie Grattan
- Joe Hooks as Carlyle Jones
- Bev Killick as Bev (Stadium Official)
- Gloria Ajenstat as Doctor
- Peter Hitchener as Newsreader
- Maggie Naouri as Rima Saad
- Alex Cooke as Young Constable
- Bernard Curry as Dean Simic
- Dinesh Matthew as Karim
- Tethloach Ruey as Ruai Nyawan
- Troy Davis as Labourer
- Bryce Hardy as Redbacks Coach
- Rory Bochner as Mia Canny

== Episodes ==
No.	Title	Directed by	Written by	Original release date
1	"Shadow Man"	Daina Reid	Matt Cameron, Ian Collie, Lisa Cox, Elise McCredie, Rachael Turk	18 October 2017
Jacob, an honest, hard working young South Sudanese refugee living in the suburb of Sunshine with his mother and sister, is a talented basketball player, dreaming big of playing in the NBA. However his life could be changed forever when he and his mates are involved in joy-riding in a four-door Porsche SUV stolen from an affluent suburb. At the end of the night a 15 year old girl is found injured and unconscious in front of the house where the owner of the Porsche lives.
2	"Dark Knight"	Daina Reid	Matt Cameron, Ian Collie, Lisa Cox, Elise McCredie, Rachael Turk	19 October 2017
3	"Find Your Man"	Daina Reid	Matt Cameron, Ian Collie, Lisa Cox, Elise McCredie, Rachael Turk	25 October 2017
4	"Jacob's Ladder"	Daina Reid	Matt Cameron, Ian Collie, Lisa Cox, Elise McCredie, Rachael Turk	26 October 2017

== Reception ==
Guardian Australia critic Luke Buckmaster described the series as an "excellent, beautifully balanced drama", and "one of the standout TV shows of the year". On 6 December 2017, the series received the AACTA Award for Best Telefeature, Mini Series or Short Run Series at the 7th AACTA Awards ceremony. It also received three nominations at the 2018 Monte-Carlo Television Festival: Best Long Fiction Program, Outstanding Actor in a Long Fiction Program (Anthony LaPaglia), and Outstanding Actress in a Long Fiction Program (Melanie Lynskey).

== Home media ==
The mini-series has been published by Roadshow Entertainment as four separate episodes as broadcast, in a two-DVD package.
