= Diary of an Uber Driver =

- Genre: Comedy drama
- Written by: Thomas Ward
- Directed by: Matthew Moore
- Starring: Sam Cotton; Zahra Newman; John Bell; Caroline Brazier; Ed Oxenbould; Julian Maroun; Emily Barclay; Harry Cook
- Country of origin: Australia
- Original language: English
- No. of series: 1
- No. of episodes: 6

Production
- Executive producers: Michael Ritchie; Steve Rogers; Greg Sitch; Nina Stevenson; Will Vicars
- Producers: Lauren Edwards; Martha Coleman
- Running time: 30 minutes
- Production company: RevLover Films

Original release
- Network: ABC TV
- Release: 14 August 2019

Diary of an Uber Driver is an Australian television comedy-drama series screened on ABC TV from 14 August 2019, based on a blog and e-book by Ben Phillips. The TV series was written by Thomas Ward and directed by Matthew Moore.

== Plot ==
Diary of an Uber Driver follows Uber driver Ben as he transports a number of disparate characters to their destinations. The passengers display a range of behaviours, with each trip telling a part of their stories and evoking a range of reactions by Ben. Ben's background story unfolds as the series progresses, as he tries to prepare for impending unplanned fatherhood with the mother of his child, whom he hardly knows.

== Cast ==
- Sam Cotton as Ben
- Zahra Newman as Beck
- John Bell as Ken
- Caroline Brazier as Jodie
- Ed Oxenbould as Clint
- Julian Maroun as Mo
- Emily Barclay as Georgie
- Harry Cook as Mike Fisher
- Rajan Velu as Saad
- Sandy Gore as Anne

== Background and production ==
Ben Phillips' blog and e-book Diary of an Uber Driver was optioned for development as a TV series by RevLover Films' Martha Coleman. Thomas Ward, co-writer of and actor in Please Like Me, wrote the TV series after reading the blog, creating a different backstory for Ben but borrowing ideas from some of the stories of the passengers. Sam Cotton was recruited to play the lead character and Zahra Newman the mother of his unborn child.

The series was supported by Screen Australia, Create NSW and All3Media.

== Episodes ==
No.	Title	Directed by	Written by	Original release date	Australia viewers (millions)
1	"Episode 1"	Matthew Moore	Thomas Ward	14 August 2019	N/A
2	"Episode 2"	Matthew Moore	Thomas Ward	21 August 2019	N/A
3	"Episode 3"	Matthew Moore	Thomas Ward	28 August 2019	N/A
4	"Episode 4"	Unknown	Unknown	4 September 2019	N/A
5	"Episode 5"	Unknown	Unknown	11 September 2019	N/A
6	"Episode 6"	Unknown	Unknown	18 September 2019	N/A
