= Felony (film) =

2013 film

- Film poster
- Directed by: Matthew Saville
- Written by: Joel Edgerton
- Produced by: Michael Benaroya; Rosemary Blight; Joel Edgerton
- Starring: Tom Wilkinson; Joel Edgerton; Jai Courtney; Melissa George
- Cinematography: Mark Wareham
- Edited by: Geoff Hitchins
- Music by: Bryony Marks
- Production companies: Benaroya Pictures; Blue-Tongue Films; Goalpost Pictures; Screen Australia
- Release dates: 10 September 2013 (TIFF); 28 August 2014 (Australia)
- Running time: 105 minutes
- Country: Australia
- Language: English

Felony is a 2013 Australian crime thriller film directed by Matthew Saville. Joel Edgerton wrote, produced and co-starred in the film. Tom Wilkinson, Jai Courtney, and Melissa George also appeared in the film. It was screened in the Special Presentation section at the 2013 Toronto International Film Festival.

== Plot ==
While chasing an escaping suspect during a raid on a drug lab, Detective Malcolm “Mal” Toohey (Joel Edgerton) is shot and saved by his protective vest. After celebrating, Mal drives home drunk and hits a young boy on a bike with his side-view mirror. He calls an ambulance, but denies any involvement in the accident. When honest young detective constable Jim Melic (Jai Courtney) and his cynical older partner Carl Summer (Tom Wilkinson) arrive on the scene, Carl recognizes Mal and sends Jim off to secure the perimeter. He questions Mal privately and sends him home, making Jim suspicious.

The boy is identified as William Sarduka and Jim falls in love with the boy's mother, Ankhila (Sarah Roberts). Meanwhile, Carl has become obsessed with proving that a pedophile named Victor is responsible for the abduction and rape of a young girl. During a court hearing, Victor is released on bail. Afterwards, Carl cynically criticizes and questions the legal system. At a secret meeting with Carl, Mal says he wants to come clean and reveal his responsibility for the accident, unlike his witness statement in which he claimed to have seen the person responsible drive away. Carl insists that Mal keep it secret, for both their sakes, but he cannot get Mal to agree.

Mal and his family visit Ankhila and William in the hospital. At home, Mal tells his wife Julie (Melissa George) that he hit William and she tells Mal that William has brain damage and will likely die. Their relationship becomes distant. Carl finds Jim in the hospital parking lot, but cannot convince Jim to back off, and appears to make him even more resolute in his investigation of Mal. Jim offers to take Ankhila to the hospital and she accepts his offer. At her apartment, he tries to kiss her, but she rejects him. They drive to the hospital in silence and arrive to find William has just died. Jim stands alone in the corridor outside the hospital room, dejected.

Mal arranges a meeting with Carl and Jim, in which he tells Jim he hit William and is going to come clean. Carl belittles Mal for being weak. Turning to Jim, Carl accuses him of sleeping with Ankhila. He begins taunting him, claiming he is as imperfect as his colleagues, and sneeringly suggesting Jim might get AIDS. Jim grapples Carl onto the ground in a headlock. Mal separates the two, but Carl lies on the ground, unconscious. Jim calls an ambulance as Mal tries to help Carl.

Mal goes to visit Carl in the hospital, but slack-mouthed, and apparently having had a stroke, he can only say the words "yeah" and "good". Out in the corridor, Mal tells Jim that the doctors said it was going to happen to Carl soon, regardless, to comfort him. Mal also informs Jim that there are no cameras in the back of Tamberine's, the building in which the trio had met; implying that Mal now knew Jim's secret, just as Jim knew his, and that the younger man was just as morally conflicted as he was. He drives past William's school and hears some kids calling William's name. Mal looks at them and crashes into the back of a truck, causing him to bleed heavily from his scalp. Bleeding, Mal sits at a nearby bench and then walks to Ankhila's residence. He knocks on the door, but she ignores it. He stumbles in the hallway, and his body sagging, falls unconscious.

Mal wakes up to paramedics treating him. The police arrive and talk to Ankhila. They ask Mal what happened, and he tells them she did not do anything to him. As he continues repeating those words, he tells her "I did it", and that he was sorry, tears welling in his eyes. Ankhila appears to realize Mal is responsible for her son's death, but chooses to tell the police only that Mal had helped her son. The movie ends with Mal and Julie taking their children to school. They look across the street and see Jim leaning against his car with two cups of coffee, implying that Mal is going to be Jim's new partner.

== Cast ==
- Tom Wilkinson as Carl Summer
- Joel Edgerton as Malcolm 'Mal' Toohey
- Jai Courtney as Jim Melic
- Melissa George as Julie Toohey
- Sarah Roberts as Ankhila Sarduka
- Corinna Everson as Sondra
- Tracy Mann as Gina Hopkins
- Rhonda Doyle as Renya Denka
- John Brumpton as Garbo / Street Sweeper

== Production ==
Matthew Saville signed on to direct the film with Rosemary Blight and Michael Benaroya producing. Joel Edgerton wrote, produced and starred in the film.

== Reception ==
Felony holds a 70% "Fresh" rating at Rotten Tomatoes based on 33 reviews, with an average rating of 6.61/10. The critical consensus says that: "Felony covers familiar ground but does so with uncommon style, thanks to a thought-provoking script, sharp direction, and powerful work from a talented cast."

=== Accolades ===
Award	Category	Subject	Result
AACTA Award (4th)	Best Sound	William Ward	Nominated
AACTA Award (4th)	Best Sound	Robert Mackenzie	Nominated
AACTA Award (4th)	Best Sound	Andrew Plain	Nominated
AACTA Award (4th)	Best Sound	Grant Shepherd	Nominated
ADG Award	Best Direction in a Feature Film	Matthew Saville	Nominated
AFCA Award	Best Actor in a Supporting Role	Jai Courtney	Nominated
ASSG Award	Feature Film Soundtrack of the Year	Bryony Marks	Nominated
ASSG Award	Best Achievement in Mixing for a Feature Film	Robert Mackenzie	Nominated
ASSG Award	Best Achievement in Mixing for a Feature Film	Sam Hayward	Nominated
FCCA Awards	Best Screenplay	Joel Edgerton	Nominated
FCCA Awards	Best Actor	Joel Edgerton	Nominated
FCCA Awards	Best Supporting Actor	Jai Courtney	Nominated
FCCA Awards	Best Supporting Actor	Tom Wilkinson	Nominated
FCCA Awards	Best Supporting Actress	Melissa George	Nominated
