= Christopher Chung (actor) =

Australian actor and singer (born 1988)

- Born: Christopher Patrick Chung; 13 July 1988 (age 38)
- Occupations: Actor, singer and personal trainer
- Years active: 2001–present
- Spouse: Frances Mayli McCann

Christopher Patrick Chung (born 13 July 1988) is an Australian actor, singer and personal trainer. He is best known for playing Roddy Ho in the Apple TV+ series Slow Horses, which earned him a nomination for the 2025 British Academy Television Award for Best Supporting Actor. He also stars in the 2026 TV adaptation of My Brilliant Career on Netflix.

== Early life and education ==
Christopher Patrick Chung was born on 13 July 1988 to an Irish mother from Limerick and a Malaysian Chinese father. His parents met at a party while studying in London in the 1970s. Chung grew up in Mornington and Mount Eliza, suburbs of Melbourne located on the Mornington Peninsula.

He attended Padua College, graduating in 2006. At his school, there were only a handful of children of Chinese heritage.

Chung was part of the local amateur dramatic group, auditioned for musical competitions including Australian Idol and The X Factor, and attended workshops at St Martin's Youth Theatre. Through St. Martin’s, he was invited to the Ward Acting Studio in New York for a six-month intensive course. At the time, he was working in retail after having dropped out of college.

Chung also completed an acting course in Philadelphia, before moving to London, UK in 2012.

== Career ==
In 2011, Chung appeared in one episode of the Australian soap opera Neighbours. Six months after moving to London, he was cast in his first UK television role as Archie Wong in BBC’s Waterloo Road. He also performed on stage, playing Kurt in Heathers: The Musical at West End theatre and Paris in Romeo and Juliet at Shakespeare’s Globe.

After theatres closed during the COVID-19 pandemic, Chung briefly contemplated taking a break from acting. Shortly after, he was cast in his breakout role as Roddy Ho in the British spy drama series Slow Horses on Apple TV+ (2022–present).

In 2024, Chung starred in Steve McQueen's wartime drama film Blitz. In 2025, he was cast as Cassio in Doctor Who season 2, with Ncuti Gatwa playing the doctor.

He plays leading role Harry Beecham, opposite Philippa Northeast's Sybylla, in the Netflix historical drama series My Brilliant Career (2026), based on Miles Franklin's 1901 novel of the same name. Filmed in South Australia, the series premiered on 13 August 2026. Beecham's role was not written as a Chinese Australian, but the series creator, Liz Doran, wanted to explore the complex history of early Chinese settlers in Australia.

== Recognition and awards ==
For his role in Slow Horses, Chung was nominated for the British Academy Television Award for Best Supporting Actor in the 2025 BAFTAs, and became the third male actor of East Asian descent to be nominated.

== Personal life ==
Chung met Scottish actress Frances Mayli McCann in 2014 while auditioning for a Miss Saigon remake. The couple got engaged in 2016 and were married—first in a traditional Chinese ceremony in Melbourne in 2020, and then in a western-style wedding in Glasgow, Scotland in 2021. They live in London.

=== Endorsements and other ventures ===
Chung works as a personal trainer at the Fred’s Gym in North Hampstead, London. In an interview with The Observer, he said that he’s “hesitant to give up the profession because it keeps him grounded.”

== Filmography ==
=== Television ===
Year	Title	Role	Notes
2006	Australian Idol	Contestant	Season 4, Top 100
2009	Memoirs of an Alien	Kindel	BBC pilot, never aired
2011	Neighbours	Clay Lambert	1 episode
2013–2014	Waterloo Road	Archie Wong	Season 9, 12 episodes
2020	Doctors	Choi Minjun	1 episode
2022–present	Slow Horses	Roddy Ho	30 episodes
2025	Doctor Who	Cassio	1 episode
2026	Dragon Striker	Additional voices	1 episode
2026	My Brilliant Career	Harry Beecham	6 episodes

=== Film ===
Year	Title	Role	Notes
2008	Six Men's Health	Alex	
2010	I'll Meet You in New York	Male	Short film
2010	Paranoia	Chan	
2014	Night Bus	Chris	
2019	Secret Santa	Glen	Short film
2022	Bus Girl	Mr Beau	Short film
2023	Gods of Their Own Religion	C2	
2024	Blitz	Fred	
TBA	Sandwich Man		Short film Post-production

=== Theatre ===
Year	Title	Role	Theatre
2001	The King & I	Prince Chulalongkorn	Panorama Theatre Group
2004	Fame	Lead vocalist	Panorama Theatre Group
2005	Grease	Roger	Panorama Theatre Group
2009	Seasons of Excellence	Dr Jekyll / Mr Hyde	VCE
2011	I Wish You a Boat/Almost Home	Various	Ward Studio Company (Philadelphia)
2018	Heathers: The Musical	Kurt Kelly	The Other Palace & Theatre Royal Haymarket
	Romeo and Juliet	Paris	Globe Theatre

=== TV commercials ===
Year	Title	Role	Notes
2009	It's Your Future Initiative	Spokesman	Producer Australian Government
2010–2011	Sky Movies HD	Geek	Director Fredrik Bond
