= The Un-Road Trip =

- Created by: Boaz Frankel
- Written by: Boaz Frankel, Todd Lewis
- Directed by: Todd Lewis
- Starring: Boaz Frankel, Caroline Avery Granger, Paul Gude, Peter McKay
- Country of origin: United States
- No. of seasons: 1
- No. of episodes: 10

Production
- Executive producers: Marshall Nord, Becky Henderson
- Producer: Todd Lewis
- Cinematography: David Temple
- Editors: Cliff McGinnis, Todd Lewis
- Running time: 30 minutes

Original release
- Network: Halogen TV
- Release: April 22 – June 24, 2011

The Un-Road Trip is an American reality television series featuring Boaz Frankel, a Portland, Oregon resident, as he travels 12,000 miles across North America using 101 non-gas powered modes of transportation. Most of the show was filmed over a ten-week period beginning in April 2009. It was first aired as a weekly series on Halogen TV, beginning on April 22, 2011.

== Production ==
The basis for the series was a two-month trip Boaz Frankel took in spring 2009. While involved in other projects, Frankel kept in touch "with executives or producers" at cable networks including the Discovery Channel, hoping to turn the video footage from the trip into a series; executives at the latter "wouldn’t quite commit, but were ...eager to keep in touch."

When Frankel became aware of Halogen TV, a secular channel owned by The Inspiration Networks, he contacted them. Marshall Nord, Halogen's program director, had him flown to North Carolina to meet with staff producer Todd Lewis; as a result, Halogen licensed the video footage Frankel had made during his spring 2009 trip, and "signed him to produce, co-write and host a 10-episode series of 30-minute" episodes. In late July 2010, Frankel returned to North Carolina where intro segments he wrote for the series were recorded; the segments were set in a "rustic wood cabin that once served as a general store in Jim and Tammy Bakker's Heritage USA amusement park" and featured Frankel, two of his friends and an actress playing a third friend, ...pretending to listen to Frankel as he describes slides he has taken on the real trip depicted in the video footage he licensed to them. Their "(often-sarcastic) responses lead into actual video vignettes, which then form the core of the series."

== List of episodes ==
The following is a list of episodes:

No.	Title	Original release date
1	"Onward from Oregon"	April 22, 2011
Boaz begins a car-free cross-country journey on a motorized cooler, traveling through Lodi on an agricultural helicopter and sailing around Santa Barbara on a catamaran.
2	"From Cali to Camels"	April 29, 2011
Boaz, in Los Angeles, hops on the Kangoo Jumps craze and rides a camel in Albuquerque.
3	"Cruisin' to the Capitol"	May 8, 2011
Boaz is in Chicago with a walking rickshaw and a wine bike, then in Washington D.C. for a ride on a secret subway.
4	"Caloosahatchee or Bust!"	May 13, 2011
In Florida, Boaz avoids alligators on Lake Okeechobee and kayaks the Caloosahatchee River.
5	"Escape from Punta Gorda"	May 20, 2011
Boaz escapes on a Harley, with brief rides in a shopping cart and a unicycle.
6	"Bike the Big Apple"	May 27, 2011
Boaz is in New York City on a cargo bike, sees the future at Massachusetts Institute of Technology and the past in a 1920s barnstormer.
7	"Boaz’s Bike Bonanza"	June 3, 2011
In New England, Boaz travels 30 miles on a Segway PT, rides a bike through the New Hampshire hills, and gets airborne on a paraglider.
8	"Canada on Couch Bike"	June 10, 2011
Boaz covering many kilometers on Couch Bike, then returned stateside for a rollercoaster ride at the Mall of America.
9	"Westward Bound"	June 17, 2011
Boaz heads west, through Minneapolis on a Pedal Pub, Idaho on a seaplane and hitchhiking in Seattle.
10	"The End of The Un-Road Trip?"	June 24, 2011
Following a wipeout in Seattle, a jug band jam on a seven-man bike, Boaz ends his journey back in Portland on a Velomobile.
