= Matthew Saville =

Australian film director

- Born: c. 1966 (age c. 59)
- Education: Victorian College of the Arts
- Occupations: Film director, screenwriter, television director
- Notable work: Noise; Cloudstreet; Felony
- Spouse: Bryony Marks (m. 2003)
- Children: 2 sons

Matthew Saville (born c. 1966) is an Australian television and film director, known for Noise (2007) and A Month of Sundays (2015).

== Early life and education ==
Matthew Saville was born around 1966, the youngest of six children, and grew up in Adelaide, South Australia. He studied at the Victorian College of the Arts.

== Career ==
Saville began his career working as a titles designer for many Australian television series. Several of his short films, including Franz and Kafka, have received awards and screened widely at film festivals. He came to wider prominence as a writer/director with his one-hour film Roy Hollsdotter Live, a bittersweet comedy about a stand-up comedian experiencing a personal breakdown. The film won awards at the Sydney Film Festival in 2003, as well as at the Australian Writers' Guild Awards.

He directed the TV comedy series Big Bite (2003–4) and We Can Be Heroes: Finding The Australian of the Year (2005), on both occasions working with Chris Lilley, as well as episodes of the drama series The Secret Life of Us (2001–2005) and the first three episodes of The Surgeon (2005).

In 2007, Saville's feature film debut Noise was released, for which he received an AFI nomination for Best Director. In September 2007, his opera, Crossing Live, with music by his wife Bryony Marks, was staged at the Malthouse Theatre in Melbourne. It won Victorian Green Room Awards in New Operatic Work, Best New Australian Opera Work, and was shortlisted in the 2008 Victorian Premier's Literary Awards, Prize for Best Music Script.

In 2010, he directed Cloudstreet, a television miniseries version of Tim Winton's novel. Saville worked alongside Josh Thomas, directing several episodes of Please Like Me (2013–2016), the ABC hit comedy/drama show. His film Felony was screened in the Special Presentation section at the 2013 Toronto International Film Festival.

Saville wrote and directed the 2015 film A Month of Sundays starring Anthony LaPaglia.

He co-directed season 1 of the 2023 Stan Original crime drama series Black Snow.

Saville co-directed, with Nina Buxton, the 2026 ABC comedy drama series Dog Park. Also in 2026 he co-directed, with Emma Jackson , the Paramount+ series Dalliance, released on 27 August.

== Personal life ==
Saville married Bryony Marks, who is a well-known screen composer. They married in 2003 at her parents' vineyard in Gembrook, in the Dandenongs, and have two sons.

Marks has written the scores for several of Saville's films and TV series, including Noise, Felony, and Please Like Me, as well as many others.
