= Thomas Ward (actor) =

Australian actor, writer and comedian

- Born: Thomas Ward
- Occupations: Writer; actor; comedian
- Years active: 2013–present
- Television: Please Like Me; Diary of an Uber Driver
- Spouse: Emily Barclay (m.2023-present)
- Children: 2

Thomas Ward, also known as Tom Ward, is an Australian actor, writer and comedian best known for his role in the award-winning television comedy-drama series Please Like Me, many episodes of which he co-wrote.

== Career ==
Ward co-wrote many episodes of the four series of Please Like Me, along with creator Josh Thomas, which aired on ABC2 between 2013 and 2018 and was nominated for and won numerous awards. He also played the part of Josh's housemate Tom in the series.

In 2015 he played the lead role in Matt Vesely's short film My Best Friend Is Stuck on the Ceiling, produced by Sophie Hyde and selected for inclusion in the 2015 Adelaide Film Festival, 2016 Palm Springs International ShortFest, 2016 Sydney Film Festival (where it was a Dendy Awards finalist) and the 2016 Melbourne Film Festival. The film became publicly available on YouTube after it was selected by the "Short of the Week" channel on 11 May 2020.

In 2018 Ward co-created a pilot for New Zealand TV channel Three, called Golden Boy. It was first selected to be produced as part of the Three network's "Comedy Pilot Week", after which it was commissioned as a full 8-part comedy series. The series premiered on Three in 2019, attracting positive reviews.

In 2019 he wrote the six-part comedy-drama series Diary of an Uber Driver for ABC TV, which starred Sam Cotton.

In 2023, Ward announced he was a writer on Amy Sherman-Palladino and Daniel Palladino's comedy-drama series, Etolie. The series aired in April 2025.

== Personal life ==
Ward married actor Emily Barclay in 2023, who he met on the set of Please Like Me. They have two children together.
