= Matt Cameron (playwright) =

Australian playwright, screenwriter, and director

Matt Cameron is an Australian playwright, screenwriter, and director.

== Early life ==
Matt Cameron was born in Melbourne.

== Career ==
=== Theatre ===
Mr Melancholy (1995) was produced by Griffin in Sydney, La Boite in Brisbane and won the ANPC/New Dramatists Award, which led to a New York production with New York Stage & Film.

Tear from a Glass Eye (1998) was produced by Playbox in Melbourne and the Gate Theatre in London, where he was nominated Most Promising Playwright in the Evening Standard Awards.

Footprints on Water (2000) won the British Council International New Playwriting Award and was produced by his company, Neonheart, for Griffin in Sydney, La Mama in Melbourne, and ABC Radio.

Ruby Moon (2003) was shortlisted for Queensland Premier's Literary Awards and produced by Théâtre Claque in Lausanne, Switzerland in 2004.

Hinterland (2004) was produced by Melbourne Theatre Company at the Victorian Arts Centre in Melbourne (2004) and shortlisted for New South Wales Premier's Literary Awards in 2005.

His play Poor Boy (2009) was selected by the Melbourne Theatre Company to open the Southbank Theatre.

=== Television series ===
Cameron wrote for Full Frontal during 1994–1995.

He was the co-creator, co-writer and director for the 2000 comedy television series Introducing Gary Petty, for which he won an AWGIE, and Small Tales & True for The Comedy Channel on Foxtel.

He also created and wrote or co-wrote Jack Irish (2012-2016), Sunshine (2017); Safe Harbour (2018); and The Clearing (2023).

He co-created, with Jason Stephens, a Stan Original TV series, Prosper, released in January 2024. It stars Richard Roxburgh, Rebecca Gibney, and Ewen Leslie.
