= Liz Doran =

Australian screenwriter

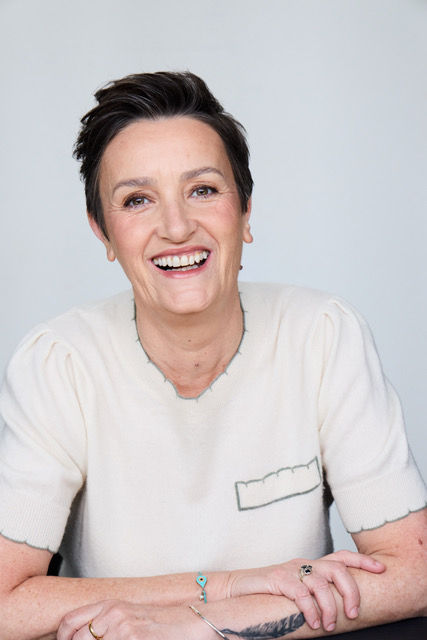
- Occupations: Screenwriter; Producer
- Years active: 2002–present

Liz Doran is an Australian screenwriter and producer based in Sydney, New South Wales. She is known for her work as a writer on the AACTA Award-winning comedy-drama Please Like Me, and as co-creator, head writer, and executive producer of the drama series Barons. She is currently attached as executive producer, writer, and showrunner on the Netflix adaptation My Brilliant Career.

== Career ==
Doran developed and served as executive producer, writer, and showrunner on the TV series My Brilliant Career, an adaptation of Miles Franklin's novel, produced for Netflix. She also wrote on Grown Ups, a drama series created by Samantha Strauss and based on Marian Keyes' novel of the same name, produced for Netflix UK.

Doran served as a writer for Please Like Me, a comedy-drama series for ABC (Australia) and Pivot Network. The series won the AACTA Award for Best Comedy and received nominations at the International Emmy Awards, the Rose d'Or Awards, the GLAAD Media Awards, and the Logie Awards. Doran was a joint winner of an AWGIE Award for the episode "Portuguese Custard Tarts" in Season 1, co-written with Josh Thomas and Thomas Ward. The Season 4 episode "Burrito Bowl", which she co-wrote with Josh Thomas and Thomas Ward, was shortlisted for the Betty Roland Prize for Scriptwriting at the 2018 NSW Premier's Literary Awards.

Doran was co-creator, head writer, and executive producer of the drama series Barons. The series received a nomination for the AACTA Award for Best Miniseries. In 2020, she produced the short-form online series The Tailings, a six-part series for SBS, which won the AACTA Award for Best Short Form Drama in 2021.

Doran wrote for the Stan Original series Prosper. She wrote on Series 1 through 5 of Doctor Doctor, and was the Co-creator and writer of Episode 1 of the two-part Channel 7 miniseries Molly, based on the life of music critic Ian "Molly" Meldrum. She was co-creator, script producer, and head writer on the ABC series Ready for This, which received a nomination at the International Emmy Awards.

Her other television credits include episodes of Miss Fisher's Murder Mysteries (ABC), Rescue Special Ops, The Secret Life of Us, Carla Cametti PD, McLeod's Daughters, and the UK drama series Sugar Rush, which won an International Emmy Award and received a BAFTA nomination. Doran served as series story editor and writer for Seasons 1 to 3 of Dance Academy, a children's drama series for the ABC.

Doran has also worked as a script editor on film projects, including The Square, directed by Nash Edgerton, produced by Louise Smith, and co-written by Joel Edgerton and Matthew Dabner.

== Filmography ==
Key
| † | Denotes television productions that have not yet been released |

| Year | Title | Creator | Writer | Executive producer | Notes |
|---|---|---|---|---|---|
| 2002–05 | The Secret Life of Us | No | Yes | No | |
| 2004 | Love Bytes | No | Yes | No | |
| 2005 | The Alice | No | Yes | No | |
| 2006 | Sugar Rush | No | Yes | No | |
| 2008 | McLeod's Daughters | No | Yes | No | |
| 2009 | Carla Cametti PD | No | Yes | No | |
| 2009 | Rescue: Special Ops | No | Yes | No | |
| 2010–13 | Dance Academy | No | Yes | No | |
| 2012 | Miss Fisher's Murder Mysteries | No | Yes | No | |
| 2013–16 | Please Like Me | No | Yes | Script producer | Also acted in one episode |
| 2014 | Love Child | No | Yes | No | |
| 2015 | Ready for This | Yes | Yes | Script producer | Also acted in one episode |
| 2016 | Molly | No | Yes | No | |
| 2016–21 | Doctor Doctor | No | Yes | No | |
| 2019 | Zomboat! | No | Yes | No | |
| 2021 | The Tailings | No | No | Producer | |
| 2022 | Barons | Yes | Yes | Yes | |
| 2024 | Prosper | No | Yes | No | |
| 2026 | My Brilliant Career | Developer | Yes | Yes | |
| TBA | Grown Ups † | No | Yes | No | |

== Awards and nominations ==
| Year | Award | Category | Project | Result | Ref. |
|---|---|---|---|---|---|
| 2012 | AWGIE Awards | Children's Television | Dance Academy | Nominated | |
| 2013 | AWGIE Awards | Comedy – Situation or Narrative | Please Like Me ("Portuguese Custard Tarts") | Won (joint) | |
| 2013 | AWGIE Awards | Comedy – Situation or Narrative | Please Like Me ("Spanish Eggs") | Nominated | |
| 2018 | NSW Premier's Literary Awards | Betty Roland Prize for Scriptwriting | Please Like Me ("Burrito Bowl") | Shortlisted | |
| 2021 | AACTA Awards | Best Short Form Drama | The Tailings | Won | |
| 2022 | AACTA Awards | Best Miniseries | Barons | Nominated | |
