= Please Like Me =

Australian comedy television series

- Genre: Comedy drama
- Created by: Josh Thomas
- Written by: Josh Thomas; Thomas Ward; Liz Doran
- Directed by: Matthew Saville; Josh Thomas
- Starring: Josh Thomas; Debra Lawrance; David Roberts; Judi Farr; Thomas Ward; Wade Briggs; Caitlin Stasey; Nikita Leigh-Pritchard; Renee Lim; Denise Drysdale; Hannah Gadsby; Charles Cottier; Keegan Joyce; Charlotte Nicdao; Bob Franklin; Emily Barclay
- Opening theme: "I'll Be Fine" by Clairy Browne & The Bangin' Rackettes
- Composer: Bryony Marks
- Country of origin: Australia
- Original language: English
- No. of seasons: 4
- No. of episodes: 32 (list of episodes)

Production
- Executive producers: Todd Abbott; Debbie Lee; Josh Thomas; Kevin Whyte; Rick Kalowski; Brett Sleigh; Jeff Skoll; Holly A. Hines; Chris Loveall; Belisa Balaban
- Producers: Todd Abbott; Lisa Wang
- Cinematography: Katie Milwright; Matthew Temple
- Editors: Chris Branagan; Julie-Anne De Ruvo; Geoff Hitchins
- Camera setup: Single-camera
- Running time: 25–27 minutes
- Production companies: Pigeon Fancier Productions; John & Josh International; Australian Broadcasting Corporation; Participant Media (2014–16)

Original release
- Network: ABC2 (2013–14); ABC (2015–16)
- Release: 28 February 2013 – 14 December 2016

Please Like Me is an Australian comedy-drama television series created by and starring Josh Thomas. Thomas also serves as a writer for every episode. The series premiered on 28 February 2013 on ABC2 in Australia and is on occasion available on Netflix in certain regions. The show explores realistic issues with humorous tones; executive producer Todd Abbott had pitched the show as a drama rather than a sitcom. The show aired later on the United States network Pivot, which then helped to develop the show from its second season onwards. Four seasons of the show have been broadcast, and creator Thomas has stated that he has no plans to make any further episodes. The show has attracted praise from critics and has garnered numerous nominations, winning a number of awards.

== Creation ==
Please Like Me was chiefly written by Josh Thomas, who also played the main character, Josh. Most episodes were directed by Matthew Saville. Thomas and producer Todd Abbott developed the series together for four years. They held a series of consultation meetings with the Australian Broadcasting Corporation. Abbott was careful to pitch the series as a drama rather than a sitcom. It portrays a set of circumstances that could happen to a young person but has humorous themes. Thomas envisioned an original show, something he had not seen on television before. The actor, also a known comedian in Australia, wanted honesty in the script and wrote the comedy with that in mind. He also wanted the actors to not intentionally react to the scripted jokes.

In January 2013, The West Australian reported that Please Like Me would air on ABC2. The show had been meant to air on ABC1, but it was decided that the show would be better suited to the digital channel ABC2. The broadcaster stated that the show is aimed at a younger demographic more appropriate for ABC2, while ABC1 caters to all ages. The move was criticised because it was believed to be the result of the Australian Broadcasting Corporation viewing the show's content as "too gay" for their primary channel. The series begins with Josh realising that he is gay and his mother attempting suicide with an overdose of Panadol.

In September 2013, ABC1 started running the series on Wednesday nights (10pm), six months after its original ABC2 run.

It was announced in July 2013 that the series would air in the United States as part of the launch programming of Pivot, a new digital cable and satellite television channel which released the first episode of the series online prior to its screening on the channel. It would also offer the series as part of its video on demand service. Pivot also launched a social media website "pleaselikeme.org" for viewers to share personal experiences about breaking stigma and fear of being unliked, in relation to the series.

On 26 July 2013, it was announced that ABC and Pivot had commissioned a second season of the show consisting of ten episodes. The season debuted in its American territory first from 8 August 2014. Producers also added a host of new regular characters to the cast. On 12 July 2014, it was announced that the networking partnership had renewed Please Like Me for a third series also comprising ten episodes. On 7 July 2016, the series was renewed for a fourth season consisting of six episodes. On 2 February 2017, it was announced that season 4 would conclude the series.

== Plot ==
Twenty something Josh is going through a number of big changes as he navigates his first decade of adulthood. After being dumped by his girlfriend, he comes to the realization that he is gay.

== Cast ==
Actor	Character	Seasons			
Actor	Character	1	2	3	4
Main characters
Josh Thomas	Josh	Main	Main	Main	Main
Debra Lawrance	Rose (Mum)	Main	Main	Main	Main
David Roberts	Alan (Dad)	Main	Main	Main	Main
Judi Farr	Aunty Peg	Main			
Thomas Ward	Tom	Main	Main	Main	Main
Wade Briggs	Geoffrey	Main	Guest (Note: Received "Starring" credit for appearance(s), but appeared in a minority of the season's episodes.)		Guest
Caitlin Stasey	Claire	Main	Recurring	Main	Main
Nikita Leigh-Pritchard	Niamh	Main	Recurring		
Renee Lim	Mae	Main	Main	Main	Main
Denise Drysdale	Ginger		Main		
Hannah Gadsby	Hannah		Main	Main	Main
Charles Cottier	Patrick		Main		
Keegan Joyce	Arnold		Main	Main	Main
Charlotte Nicdao	Jenny		Main		
Bob Franklin	Stuart		Main	Recurring	
Emily Barclay	Ella			Main	Main
Recurring characters
John the Dog	John	Recurring	Recurring	Recurring	Recurring
Andrew S. Gilbert	Rod	Recurring			
Luke McGregor	Rental Agent	Guest		Guest	
Nick Cody	Steve		Recurring	Guest	
David Quirk	Ben			Recurring	Guest
Geoff Morrell	Bruce			Guest	Guest

== Episodes ==
Series	Episodes	Originally released		
Series	Episodes	First released	Last released	Network
1	6	28 February 2013	28 March 2013	ABC2
2	10	12 August 2014	14 October 2014	ABC2
3	10	15 October 2015	17 December 2015	ABC
4	6	9 November 2016	14 December 2016	ABC

== Reception ==
=== Critical response ===
Anthony D. Langford from AfterElton.com said that he "absolutely loved this charming series. It’s funny and sweet and has plenty of heart." He also praised Thomas's portrayal of Josh and wished that U.S. broadcasters could emulate the show's format. He later said that he would miss the show and hoped a second season would be commissioned. He added that he did not want to say goodbye to Josh's world. Andrew Mast, writing for Music.com.au, praised Briggs's "naturalistic performances" and the inclusion of accomplished actress Farr. He concluded that Thomas's writing was good and comedic, but the on-screen delivery did not meet his expectations. David Knox from TV Tonight praised the performances of many cast members. He opined that the dynamic between Josh and his parents created a "very rich comedic terrain" for the show. He added that Please Like Me displays "a confidence that delivers laughs, pathos and insight".

Colin Vickery and Darren Devlyn from News.com.au said that it "has a sweetness that sets it apart from other boundary-pushing comedies". Giles Hardie from The Age praised the show for "breaking new ground" and not making stereotypes of gay characters. He viewed the comedy as being genuine without feeling like a sitcom. He noted that coming out and attempted suicide are given humour without the gags. Hardie concluded that Josh, his family and friends were "incredibly well" played. His colleague Scott Ellis believed that Please Like Me was an important show and the type of material the ABC should be investing more in. He also branded it "gentle" and insightful when covering "tough ground". Fellow critic Craig Mathieson also agreed that the show's darker moments are some of the most humorous and compared it to American show Louie. Please Like Me received an invitation to screen at the Series Mania Television Festival in Paris.

The A.V. Club regarded season 2 of Please Like Me as one of the year's best shows, praising the camera work and Josh's performance. The Guardian praised Please Like Me's "unconventional writing".

The season 3 premiere episode of Please Like Me, "Eggplant," received praise for its portrayal of a gay sex scene, described in IndieWire as "a very tender moment that is rarely afforded to queer characters in films or TV series." The scene is cited as a significant shift for Australian broadcast television because "the camera does not cut away," a shift compared to earlier portrayals that used "cinematographic censorship."

=== Awards and nominations ===
Year	Award	Category	Recipients and nominees	Result
2013	Australian Writers Guild Awards	Best Writing in a Comedy: Situation or Narrative	Josh Thomas, Liz Doran and Thomas Ward – Series 1, Episode 3 'Portuguese Custard Tarts'	Won
2013	Australian Writers Guild Awards	Best Writing in a Comedy: Situation or Narrative	Josh Thomas, Liz Doran and Thomas Ward – Series 1, Episode 5 'Spanish Eggs'	Nominated
2014	3rd AACTA Awards	Best Television Comedy Series	Please Like Me – Todd Abbott	Won
2014	3rd AACTA Awards	Best Performance in a Television Comedy	Josh Thomas	Nominated
2014	3rd AACTA Awards	Best Direction in a Television Drama or Comedy	Matthew Saville – Series 1, Episode 3 'Portuguese Custard Tarts'	Nominated
2014	GLAAD Media Awards	Outstanding Comedy Series	Please Like Me	Nominated
2014	Australian Directors Guild Awards	Best Direction: TV Comedy	Matthew Saville	Won
2014	Rose d'Or	Sitcom	Please Like Me	Nominated
2014	Logie Awards	Most Outstanding Light Entertainment Program	Please Like Me	Nominated
2014	International Emmy Award	Best Comedy Series	Please Like Me	Nominated
2014	Australian Screen Editors Awards	Best Editing in a Television Comedy	Julie-Anne De Ruvo – Season 2, Episode 2 'Ham'	Nominated
2015	4th AACTA Awards	Best Television Comedy Series	Please Like Me – Todd Abbott, Josh Thomas and Kevin Whyte	Nominated
2015	4th AACTA Awards	Best Direction in a Television Drama or Comedy	Matthew Saville – Series 2, Episode 7 'Scroggin'	Nominated
2015	4th AACTA Awards	Best Screenplay in Television	Josh Thomas – Series 2, Episode 7 'Scroggin'	Won
2015	4th AACTA Awards	Best Performance in a Television Comedy	Debra Lawrance	Won
2015	4th AACTA Awards	Best Performance in a Television Comedy	Josh Thomas	Nominated
2015	4th AACTA Awards	Best Sound in Television	John Wilkinson and Simon Rosenberg – Series 2, Episode 7 'Scroggin'	Nominated
2015	Logie Awards	Most Popular Actor	Josh Thomas, Please Like Me	Nominated
2015	Logie Awards	Most Outstanding Comedy Program	Please Like Me	Nominated
2015	GLAAD Media Awards	Outstanding Comedy Series	Please Like Me	Nominated
2015	Australian Writers Guild Awards	Best Writing in a Comedy: Situation or Narrative	Josh Thomas – Series 2, Episode 7 'Scroggin'	Won
2015	Australian Directors Guild Awards	Best Direction in a TV Comedy	Matthew Saville – Series 2, Episode 7 'Scroggin'	Won
2015	Australian Screen Editors Awards	Best Editing in a Television Comedy	Julie-Anne De Ruvo – Please Like Me (Series 2)	Won
2015	Screen Producers Australia Awards	Comedy Television Production of the Year	Please Like Me Season 2, Guesswork Television	Won
2015	Prism Awards	Comedy Episode or Multi-Episode Storyline	Please Like Me Season 2 (Pivot)	Nominated
2015	Dorian Awards	LGBTQ TV Show of the Year	Please Like Me (Pivot)	Nominated
2015	Dorian Awards	Unsung TV Show of the Year	Please Like Me (Pivot)	Nominated
2016	GLAAD Media Awards	Outstanding Comedy Series	Please Like Me (Pivot)	Nominated
2016	Logie Awards	Best Actor	Josh Thomas, Please Like Me	Nominated
2016	Logie Awards	Most Outstanding Comedy Program	Please Like Me	Nominated
2016	Australian Writers Guild Awards	Best Writing in a Comedy: Situation or Narrative	Josh Thomas – Season 3, 'Coq au Vin'	Nominated
2016	Australian Writers Guild Awards	Best Writing in a Comedy: Situation or Narrative	Josh Thomas and Liz Doran – Season 3, 'Pancakes with Faces'	Won
2016	Australian Writers Guild Awards	Best Writing in a Comedy: Situation or Narrative	Josh Thomas, Liz Doran and Thomas Ward – Season 3, 'Simple Carbohydrates'	Nominated
2016	Australian Screen Editors Awards	Best Editing in a Comedy	Julie-Anne De Ruvo – Please Like Me, Season 3 – Episode 10	Won
2016	Screen Producers Australia Awards	Comedy Television Production of the Year	Please Like Me Season 3, Guesswork Television	Nominated
2016	Prism Awards	Comedy Episode or Multi-Episode Storyline	Please Like Me Season 3 (Pivot)	Nominated
2016	6th AACTA Awards	Best Television Comedy Series	Please Like Me – Todd Abbott, Josh Thomas, Lisa Wang and Kevin Whyte	Nominated
2017	Australian Writers' Guild Awards	Best Writing in a Comedy: Situation or Narrative	Josh Thomas, Thomas Ward and Liz Doran — Season 3, ‘Burrito Bowl’	Nominated
2017	Logie Awards	Most Outstanding Supporting Actress	Debra Lawrance	Won
2017	Logie Awards	Most Outstanding Comedy Program	Please Like Me	Won

== See also ==
- List of Australian television series
- List of programs broadcast by ABC (Australian TV network)
