= Josh Thomas (comedian) =

Australian comedian

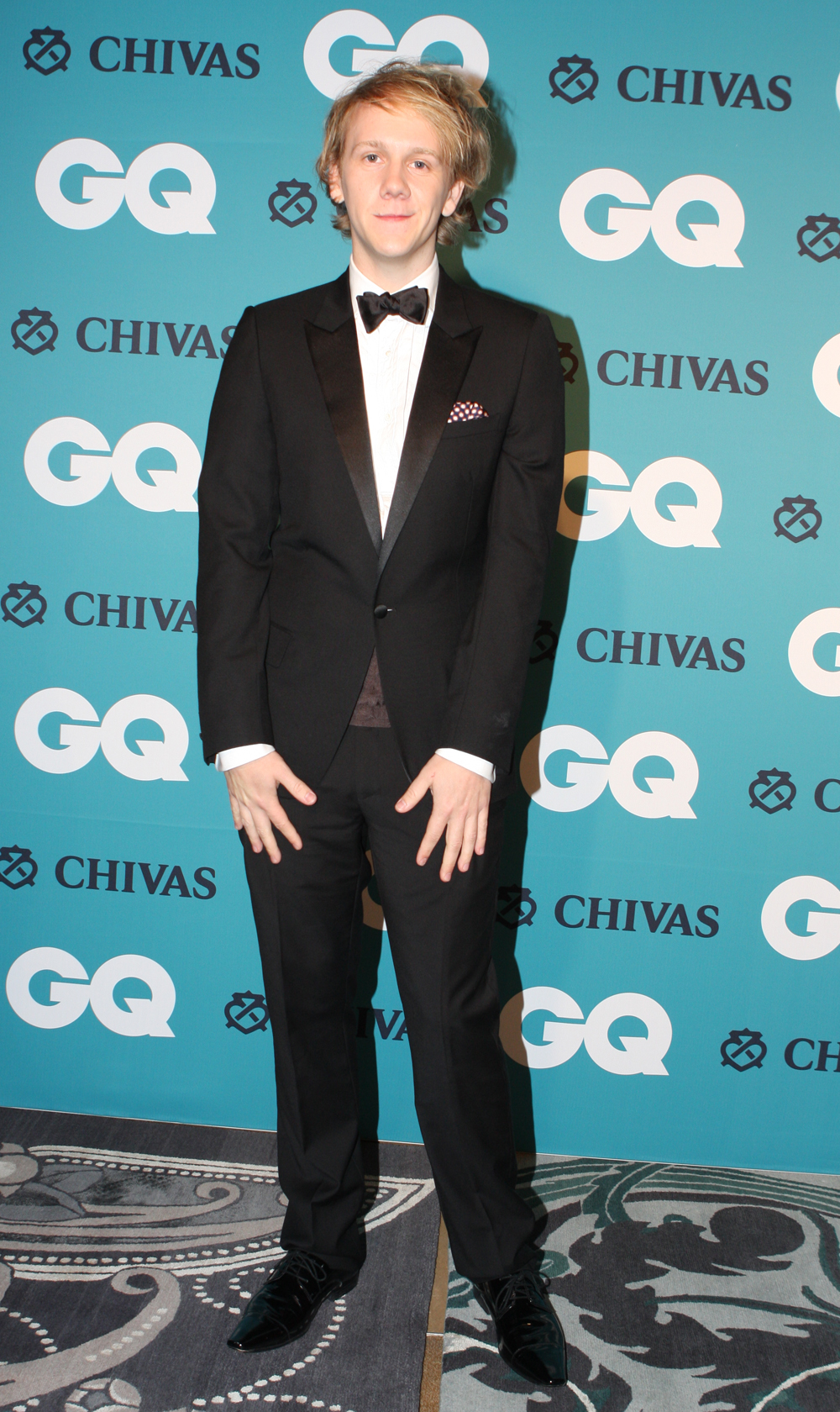
- Thomas in 2012
- Born: Joshua Michael Thomas; 26 May 1987 (age 39); Blackwater, Queensland, Australia

Comedy career
- Years active: 2005–present
- Medium: Stand-up, television, radio
- Website: JoshThomas.com.au

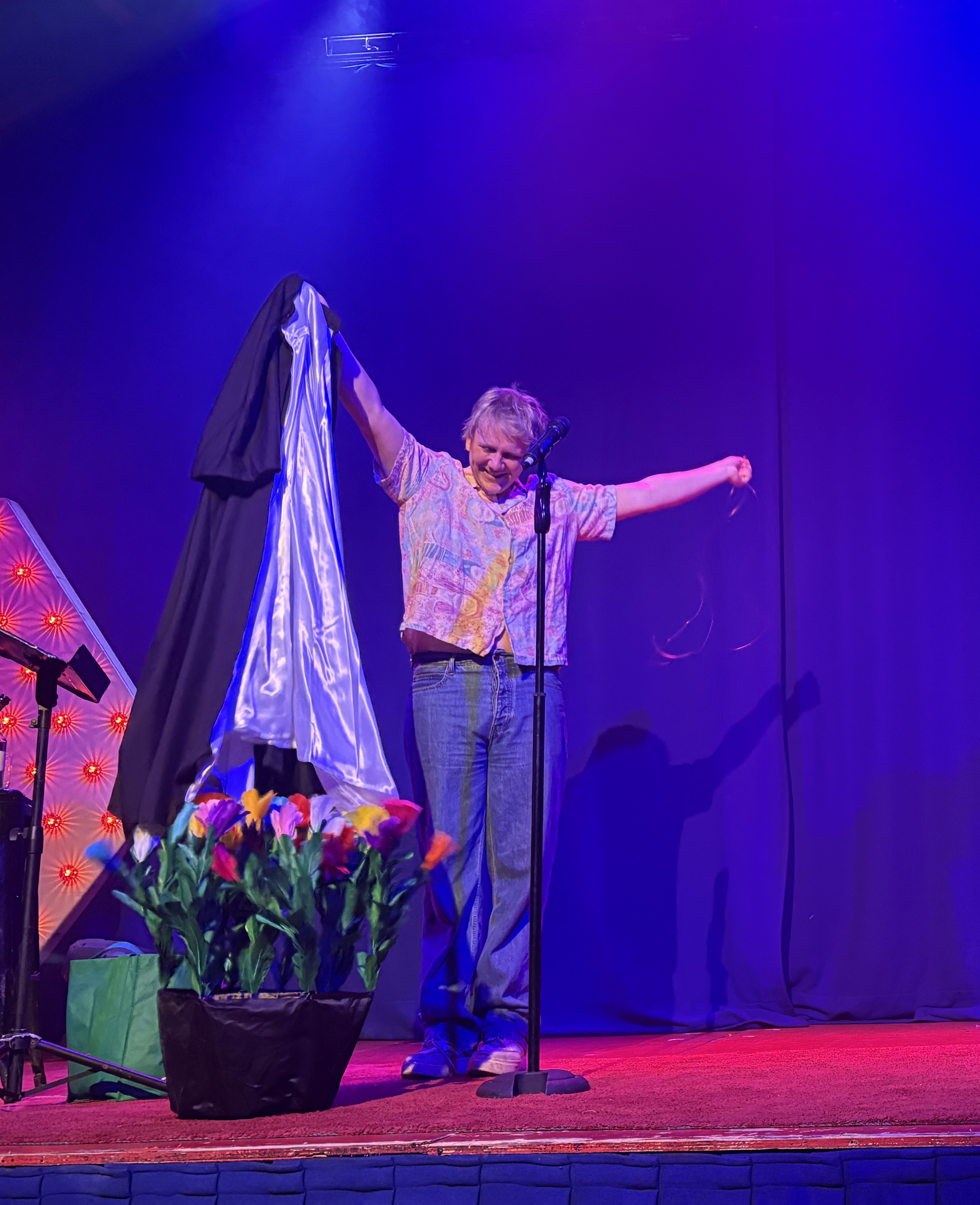
Josh Thomas trialing a new show at the Brunswick Picture House, January 2026

Joshua Michael Thomas (born 26 May 1987) is an Australian comedian, actor, and writer. In 2005, he won the Melbourne International Comedy Festival's Raw Comedy Competition. He has since appeared on television numerous times, including as a regular and Generation Y team captain on Network 10's Talkin' 'Bout Your Generation. In 2013, Thomas created the award-winning ABC2 and Pivot television series Please Like Me, which he also co-wrote and starred in.

== Early life and education ==
Joshua Michael Thomas was born in Blackwater, Queensland, the son of Rebecca and Mike Thomas.

He lived in Chapel Hill and Westlake in Brisbane's western suburbs and attended Kenmore State High School, from which he matriculated in 2004. He studied for a Bachelor of Creative Industries, majoring in television, at the Queensland University of Technology, but dropped out after one year.

== Career ==
In 2005, he won the Melbourne International Comedy Festival's RAW Comedy Award. He made the finals of So You Think You're Funny at the Edinburgh Festival Fringe. The following year, he was selected to perform in The Comedy Zone, a showcase of Australia's most promising up-and-coming comedians presented by the Melbourne International Comedy Festival.

In 2007, Thomas' first solo show, "Please Like Me" debuted at the Melbourne International Comedy Festival, where it received the Melbourne Airport Award for Best Newcomer. His live shows have toured both nationally and internationally, appearing in both Edinburgh and Montreal's comedy festivals. In 2010, Thomas toured his coming-out themed stand-up show "Surprise", taking it to the Adelaide Fringe, Brisbane Comedy Festival and Melbourne International Comedy Festival.

2011 saw him touring Everything Ever at the Melbourne Comedy Festival, among other locations.

In 2024, Thomas performed his first ever Edinburgh Festival Fringe show entitled Let's Tidy Up, having already toured the show in North America, Australia and New Zealand and performed warmup shows at the Soho Theatre, London and the Lowry, Salford. He was also a contestant on the second season of Taskmaster Australia.

=== Podcast ===
Thomas has a podcast called Josh Thomas and Friend, available from iTunes, which features Thomas and his comedian friends Mel Buttle and Tom Ward. In November 2009 a second series of the podcast was released on iTunes, and the first series was deleted. The third series was released in 2011, and the second series was deleted as well.

=== Television ===
In 2009, Thomas became a regular and Generation Y team captain on Network 10's Talkin' 'Bout Your Generation. He also competed in Celebrity MasterChef Australia, but lost in the first heat to Kirk Pengilly of INXS.

==== Please Like Me ====
In February 2013, the television series Please Like Me, written by Thomas, debuted on ABC2. Participant Media's television network Pivot acquired the series for the US and premiered all six episodes as a binge marathon on 1 August 2013 to celebrate the channel's launch after premiering the first episode online. The initial six-part series is based on his stand-up comedy shows and stars Thomas as himself.

In 2014, the series was nominated for an International Emmy Award for Best Comedy Series. For his work on the series, Thomas has won various accolades, including an AACTA Award for Best Television Screenplay in 2015. It was also short-listed for the Betty Roland Prize for Scriptwriting at the New South Wales Premier's Literary Awards.

==== Everything's Gonna Be Okay ====
In 2018, Thomas created Everything's Gonna Be Okay, a television comedy about a single man in his twenties (played by himself) who stays in the United States after his father dies to take care of his teenage half-sisters. The show was given a pilot order by Freeform, and was picked up to series. The show premiered in January 2020, with Thomas starring, writing, and serving as the showrunner in the series. Everything's Gonna Be Okay was cancelled in 2021 after two seasons.

== Personal life ==
Thomas is openly gay. He was diagnosed with attention deficit hyperactivity disorder (ADHD) at the age of 28. In 2021, he revealed that he is also autistic.

== Awards and nominations ==
=== AACTA Awards ===
Year	Nominee / work	Award	Result	Ref.
2014	Josh Thomas	Best Comedy Performance	Nominated	
2015	Please Like Me – Season 2	Best Comedy Series	Nominated	
2015	Please Like Me – Season 2, Episode 7: 'Scroggin'	Best Television Screenplay	Won	
2015	Josh Thomas	Best Comedy Performance	Nominated	
2016	Please Like Me – Season 3	Best Comedy Series	Nominated	

=== Australian Writers Guild Awards ===
Year	Nominee / work	Award	Result	Ref.
2013	Please Like Me – Series 1, Episode 3: 'Portuguese Custard Tarts'	Best Writing in a Comedy: Situation or Narrative	Won	
2013	Please Like Me – Series 1, Episode 5: 'Spanish Eggs'	Best Writing in a Comedy: Situation or Narrative	Nominated	
2015	Please Like Me – Series 2, Episode 7: 'Scroggin'	Best Writing in a Comedy: Situation or Narrative	Won	
2016	Please Like Me – Season 3, Episode 2: 'Simple Carbohydrates'	Best Writing in a Comedy: Situation or Narrative	Nominated	
2016	Please Like Me – Season 3, Episode 5: 'Coq au Vin'	Best Writing in a Comedy: Situation or Narrative	Nominated	
2016	Please Like Me – Season 3, Episode 6: 'Pancakes with Faces'	Best Writing in a Comedy: Situation or Narrative	Won	
2017	Please Like Me – Season 4, Episode 5: 'Burrito Bowl'	Best Writing in a Comedy: Situation or Narrative	Nominated	

=== GLAAD Media Awards ===
Year	Nominee / work	Award	Result	Ref.
2014	Please Like Me	Outstanding Comedy Series	Nominated	
2015	Please Like Me	Outstanding Comedy Series	Nominated	
2016	Please Like Me	Outstanding Comedy Series	Nominated	
2021	Everything's Gonna Be Okay	Outstanding Comedy Series	Nominated	

=== Logie Awards ===
Year	Nominee / work	Award	Result	Ref.
2014	Please Like Me	Most Outstanding Light Entertainment Program	Nominated	
2015	Josh Thomas	Most Popular Actor	Nominated	
2015	Please Like Me	Most Outstanding Comedy Program	Nominated	
2016	Josh Thomas	Best Actor	Nominated	
2016	Please Like Me	Most Outstanding Comedy Program	Nominated	
2017	Please Like Me	Most Outstanding Comedy Program	Won	

=== Other Awards ===
Year	Award	Category	Nominee	Result
2011	ARIA Music Awards	Best Comedy Release	Josh Thomas Surprise Warehouse Comedy Festival	Nominated
2014	International Emmy Awards	Best Comedy Series	Please Like Me	Nominated
2014	Rose d'Or	Sitcom	Please Like Me	Nominated
2015	Dorian Awards	LGBTQ TV Show of the Year	Please Like Me	Nominated
2015	Dorian Awards	Unsung TV Show of the Year	Please Like Me	Nominated
2021	Hollywood Critics Association TV Awards	Best Cable Series, Comedy	Everything's Gonna Be Okay	Nominated
