= List of Nowhere Boys episodes =

Nowhere Boys is an Australian teen-oriented television drama series created by Tony Ayres. It premiered on ABC3 on 7 November 2013. The first two series follow the adventures of four mismatched teenage boys: goth Felix Ferne (Dougie Baldwin), nerd Andrew "Andy" Lau (Joel Lok), golden child Sam Conte (Rahart Adams), and alpha jock Jake Riles (Matt Testro). On 4 April 2014, it was announced that Nowhere Boys had been renewed for a second series. It began airing on 23 November 2014. A third series of Nowhere Boys, titled Two Moons Rising, began screening from November 11, 2016, with a new cast and characters, replacing the original cast members. The fourth and final series, titled Battle For Negative Space, started airing on 3 December 2018.

== Series overview ==
| Series | Episodes | Originally released | |
| Series | Episodes | First released | Last released |
|---|---|---|---|
| 1 | 13 | 7 November 2013 | 30 January 2014 |
| 2 | 13 | 23 November 2014 | 8 February 2015 |
| Film | | 1 January 2016 | |
| 3 | 13 | 11 November 2016 | 27 January 2017 |
| 4 | 13 | 3 December 2018 | 15 December 2018 |

== Episodes ==
=== Series 1 (2013–14) ===
| No. overall | No. in season | Title | Directed by | Written by | Original release date |
|---|---|---|---|---|---|
| 1 | 1 | "Episode One" | Daina Reid | Roger Monk | 7 November 2013 |
Four year ten students - Jake, Felix, Andy and Sam are grouped together during a school orienteering excursion at the Bremin Ranges National Park and get lost. After getting caught in an unexpected storm, the boys spend the night in the forest. When they return home the next morning, the boys get chased by a furious tornado and discover that some strange things have happened; Felix's disabled brother Oscar can walk, Andy's sister Viv owns his room, and Jake cannot get into his house.
| 2 | 2 | "Episode Two" | Daina Reid | Rhys Graham | 14 November 2013 |
The boys are shocked that their families and friends do not know who they are. Andy believes it is because they have experienced a collective amnesia. Jake finds out his single mother Sarah lives at a different house and is now married to his teacher Mr. Bates. Since the boys cannot go back to their houses, they stay at an abandoned shelter in the bush.
| 3 | 3 | "Episode Three" | Daina Reid | Craig Irvin | 21 November 2013 |
Andy, Felix and Jake break into Bremin High to search for proof of themselves in the school records. When they find nothing in the records, they decide to vandalise the school gym. Sam finds out he has been replaced by a twin named Sammy, who is dating his popular girlfriend Mia. Felix finds out his friend Ellen is no longer a Goth and is now friends with Mia. The boys are later attacked by an evil spirit outside their shelter.
| 4 | 4 | "Episode Four" | Daina Reid | Rhys Graham | 28 November 2013 |
The boys wake up to find markings around their shelter. Felix thinks it was the evil spirit, so he goes to find a Book of Shadows at the local magic shop, but the owner Phoebe gives him a protective amulet instead. Andy believes they are in a state of unconsciousness. To prove his theory, Andy goes to stand in front of the school bus, but ends up saving Ellen from almost getting run over.
| 5 | 5 | "Episode Five" | Peter Carstairs | Craig Irvin | 5 December 2013 |
Sam decides to skate busk to earn money, but he gets in trouble by a policeman who confiscates his skateboard. Jake finds out the policeman is his irresponsible father Gary. When Felix and Oscar get attacked by bees, Felix uses the protective amulet but it does not work. Phoebe then gives him an elemental talisman that will protect them against elemental attacks. Felix gathers elements from Jake, Andy and Sam to use for a spell that will activate the talisman and make the bees disappear.
| 6 | 6 | "Episode Six" | Peter Carstairs | Elise McCredie | 12 December 2013 |
When Jake and Andy are caught shoplifting by Gary, Jake sacrifices himself so Andy can escape. Reunited at the shelter, Andy, Sam and Felix are attacked by crows. Meanwhile, Gary finds security footage on his computer of the boys vandalising the school gym. Phoebe helps the boys get Jake by pretending to be their aunty. When Felix says the spell that activates the talisman, it gets rid of the crows and the security footage.
| 7 | 7 | "Episode Seven" | Peter Carstairs | Polly Staniford | 19 December 2013 |
The boys return to school. While Andy becomes popular for saving Ellen, Jake bonds with his old friends, Felix hangs with Oscar, and Sam tries to win back Mia but he gets into a fight with Sammy. The boys are later chased by dogs.
| 8 | 8 | "Episode Eight" | Craig Irvin | Shanti Gudgeon | 26 December 2013 |
The boys believe Phoebe is behind the attacks, but she tells them it was a restoring demon. Phoebe also reveals Felix is a witch and that he can help her find her witch sister Alice, who disappeared ten years ago. Later, Andy's grandma Lily gets possessed by the demon and goes after Felix and Sam.
| 9 | 9 | "Episode Nine" | Craig Irvin | Roger Monk | 2 January 2014 |
The boys return to the Bremin Ranges National Park during a school orienteering excursion and retrace their steps in a bid to return home. When the boys run into Roland from the first excursion, he gets possessed by the demon and goes after them. Andy finally believes magic exists when the talisman gets rid of the demon.
| 10 | 10 | "Episode Ten" | Craig Irvin | Craig Irvin | 9 January 2014 |
Felix finds out that the unmaking spell in Alice's Book of Shadows is exactly the same as his spell. Mia gets possessed by the demon and convinces Sam that destroying the talisman will get them home. Sam listens to Mia and breaks the talisman, but they do not return home. The boys glue the talisman back together but it no longer works.
| 11 | 11 | "Episode Eleven" | Alister Grierson | Shanti Gudgeon | 16 January 2014 |
On Mother's Day, the boys' mothers are hospitalized after suffering a severe allergic reaction to them. The boys find objects that belong to their mothers to use as ingredients for a spell that will save them. Andy later finds out Felix's unmaking spell is the reason they are in the parallel universe. Meanwhile, Mr. Bates gets possessed by the demon.
| 12 | 12 | "Episode Twelve" | Alister Grierson | Roger Monk | 23 January 2014 |
As the fallout from Felix's betrayal threatens to tear the boys apart, a demon-possessed Mr. Bates goes after him. Felix discovers that Oscar is the fifth element; the missing ingredient needed to reactivate the talisman and bring the boys home. However, when the demon possesses Oscar, he and Mr. Bates kidnap Felix.
| 13 | 13 | "Episode Thirteen" | Alister Grierson | Roger Monk | 30 January 2014 |
Gary gets possessed by the demon after he stops Mr. Bates and Oscar from kidnapping Felix. The three tie Felix to a tree in the forest and a furious tornado appears in the sky. The tornado is Alice, who was the demon all along. Andy, Jake and Sam arrive to save Felix and the boys fight off the tornado by saying the unmaking spell together, which takes them back to their world. Reunited with their families, the boys discover that they each have a power of the element they represent—Felix with the power of fire, Andy with the power of water, Sam with the power of air, Jake with the power of earth, and Oscar with the power of spirit. Oscar senses it is not over yet for the boys and Alice is seen arriving in their world.

=== Series 2 (2014–15) ===
| No. overall | No. in season | Title | Directed by | Written by | Original release date |
|---|---|---|---|---|---|
| 14 | 1 | "Episode One" | Peter Salmon | Giula Sandler | 23 November 2014 |
Felix, Andy, Sam and Jake have returned home and make their first media appearance. Alice follows them back into their world and is reunited with Phoebe. After discovering that they each have a different elemental power, the boys try to learn how to control their powers. Andy tries to get goth Ellen's attention but she is not interested in him. Tired of being ignored and left in the shadow of the others, Andy angrily steals Felix's bag and runs off. He then hears a voice who urges him to cast a spell, which he does, and gets turned into water. A vortex emerges and sucks him into the sky.
| 15 | 2 | "Episode Two" | Peter Salmon | David Hannam | 23 November 2014 |
Sam and Jake break into Andy's house to find something of his to use for a reversal spell to bring Andy back before anyone notices he is missing again. However, the spell does not work. When Alice confronts the boys, she tricks them by saying that they need Andy's elemental presence to complete the spell. After the spell is cast again, Felix, Sam and Jake seemingly summon back the water Andy, but it turns out to be a water demon who looks like him and chases after them. They later return to their welcome home party, where Andy's sister Viv and a police officer question them about Andy's whereabouts.
| 16 | 3 | "Episode Three" | Peter Salmon | David Hannam | 30 November 2014 |
Following Andy's disappearance, Felix, Sam and Jake sit through a police investigation and are questioned by Roland from the forest who is a detective in their world. The police receive a phone call saying that Andy was seen in Rochford, however it is later revealed to be a hoax as the call was made in Bremin. After Felix believes Alice is responsible for what happened to Andy, the boys try to find her Book of Shadows with Oscar's help. When Alice and Oscar come into contact, they both receive visions of where the Book of Shadows is hidden. Felix, Sam and Jake then rush to the forest to get the book but Alice beats them to it.
| 17 | 4 | "Episode Four" | Peter Salmon | Craig Irvin | 7 December 2014 |
After being beaten to Alice's Book of Shadows, Felix suggests that if they find someone else who has the water element, together they could do a tracking spell to find Andy. The boys search for the new water element at school, where it is later revealed to be the new student Saskia. Felix covers for Oscar after Roland finds out that the hoax call about Andy being seen in Rochford was made from their house. Viv believes that whatever happened to Andy has something to do with the magic websites she found in his computer's internet history, and works together with Mia and Ellen to find out what the other boys know. After Sam refuses to tell Mia the truth, she breaks up with him.
| 18 | 5 | "Episode Five" | Craig Irvin | Craig Irvin | 14 December 2014 |
Felix, Sam, Jake and their new water element Saskia cast the tracking spell but it backfires, turning Jake's skin into clay. Felix believes the reason the water in the spell did not show Andy's whereabouts is because he is in the other universe, where Ellen liked him and he was popular. When Felix and Sam find out that Jake had an earth overdose because there was two earth elements used for the spell, they realise that Saskia is an earth element. After the boys discover that Ellen is the missing water element, Felix is able to cure Jake and they tell her the truth about everything. The boys and Ellen then cast the unmaking spell to take them back to the other universe to get Andy.
| 19 | 6 | "Episode Six" | Craig Irvin | Elise McCredie | 21 December 2014 |
Felix, Sam, Jake and Ellen arrive in the alternate universe but Ellen still does not believe it exists as everything looks the same. The boys are reunited with the other universe's Phoebe, Oscar, Ellen, Mia, Roland and Gary during their search for Andy. Ellen finally believes that the alternate universe and magic are real when she meets the other Ellen. At Bremin High, the school netball team get possessed by the restoring demon and chase after Felix, Sam, Jake and Ellen. After realising that the talisman cannot get rid of the demon because it has grown stronger, the gang are forced to return home. Cop Gary follows them through the portal to their world.
| 20 | 7 | "Episode Seven" | Craig Irvin | Pete McTighe | 28 December 2014 |
The gang arrive back in their universe and Felix thinks he saw a place in between the two universes on their way back. They later discover that Cop Gary has followed them to their world. When Felix and Ellen search for the necklace Andy gave her to use for the tracking spell, they find two of the same necklaces from each universe. The two necklaces cancel each other out after they touch, and Felix and Ellen realise that this could also happen to both Garys if they meet. After both Garys get possessed by the restoring demon, Jake and Sam use their powers to stop them from going near each other and Felix casts a spell that takes Cop Gary back to his universe. A window showing the place Felix saw appears in the air with Andy running inside it.
| 21 | 8 | "Episode Eight" | Rachel Griffiths | Giula Sandler | 4 January 2015 |
Felix, Sam, Jake and Ellen run towards the window showing Andy and they almost reach him, but Andy gets sucked back in and the window disappears. While trying to find a way out, Andy meets a boy with no name and he decides to call him Bear. Meanwhile, the talisman goes missing and Felix believes Saskia took it. After Oscar uses his power to sense Saskia's whereabouts, the gang find her with Alice at an altar in the forest. It is revealed that Saskia is a golem and that Alice made her so she could get the talisman. After Saskia gives the talisman back to Jake, Alice casts a spell that turns her back into clay.
| 22 | 9 | "Episode Nine" | Rachel Griffiths | David Hannam | 11 January 2015 |
After Felix casts an elemental spell so they could communicate with Andy, Alice uses her powers to block them from speaking to him. After discovering Andy is trapped in Negative Space because Alice hacked Andy's spell, the gang team up with Phoebe to destroy Alice's Book of Shadows. However, they end up destroying a phone book that Alice had enchanted to make it look like her Book of Shadows. Meanwhile, Alice casts a binding spell that lets her control Oscar and makes him walk again. When Alice forces Oscar to climb a tree, Felix has no choice but to give her the talisman so he can save Oscar from falling. Alice then casts a spell that causes the talisman to explode in the air.
| 23 | 10 | "Episode Ten" | Rachel Griffiths | Elise McCredie and David Hannam | 18 January 2015 |
With the talisman destroyed, the boys and Ellen have no way of getting Andy back. After finding out that Roland saw Oscar running and the talisman exploding, the gang suggest casting a memory-wiping spell on Roland with Alice's magic tablet. Meanwhile, Viv believes Andy disappeared magically and shows Roland a map of ley lines marking where the boys' disappearances happened. After Sam and Ellen lure Roland to the bush for the memory-wiping spell, Sam gets him into the circle. While Jake is casting the spell, Sam tries to get out of the circle but Roland pulls him back in and the spell causes them to swap bodies.
| 24 | 11 | "Episode Eleven" | Alister Grierson | Roger Monk and Giula Sandler | 25 January 2015 |
Felix, Jake and Ellen do not know that Sam and Roland have swapped bodies, and Roland uses this as an opportunity to get information from them. Felix believes that there is a second talisman in their universe because the other talisman came from the alternate universe. After Ellen notices that the talisman's lines are the same pattern as the ley lines on Viv's map, the gang realise it is the key to finding the second talisman. When they finally discover that Sam and Roland have swapped bodies, they search for the second talisman at school and find it in a secret hidden place in the woodwork room. The gang then use the talisman to reverse the memory-wiping spell and Roland and Sam return to their bodies.
| 25 | 12 | "Episode Twelve" | Alister Grierson | John Ridley and David Hannam | 1 February 2015 |
The gang plan to use the altar in the hidden place to bring Andy home, but Alice stops them by freezing the school which causes the altar to break. After checking the map again, the gang find another altar in an abandoned warehouse. When Felix places the talisman on the centre of the altar, it is revealed to be the key that opens the door to Andy. After Felix casts a spell to unlock the door, the altar shows a portal to the place Andy is in and the gang discover that the only way to get him out of there is to send someone else in. Oscar interrupts their communication with Andy and takes the talisman off the altar to stop Felix from swapping places with Andy. While Felix casts the spell again to reopen the portal, Alice casts a binding spell that takes the gang's powers away from them and into Phoebe. Alice then takes the talisman.
| 26 | 13 | "Episode Thirteen" | Alister Grierson | Blake Ayshford and Giula Sandler | 8 February 2015 |
Felix asks Alice for help because he wants to swap places with Andy. However, this is interrupted when Phoebe loses control of her powers and almost causes the building to collapse. It is revealed that the magical order is out of balance because Phoebe was given the gang's powers. This causes the restoring demon, who is now Andy, to return as a tornado and take Phoebe. Alice decides to go with her and together they go through the portal. Andy comes back and a huge blast returning everything to normal. The rest of the gang then hug Andy and then afterwards, the gang then host a welcome home party for him that Felix, Jake, Sam, Ellen and Oscar organised for him at Felix’s place then.

=== Film: The Book of Shadows (2016) ===
| Title | Directed by | Written by | Original release date |
|---|---|---|---|
| The Book of Shadows | David Caesar | Tony Ayres, Rhys Graham and Craig Irvin | 1 January 2016 |

=== Series 3: Two Moons Rising (2016–17) ===
| No. overall | No. in season | Title | Directed by | Written by | Original release date |
|---|---|---|---|---|---|
| 27 | 1 | "The New Boy" | Rowan Woods | Giula Sandller | 11 November 2016 |
It's Luke's first day at Bremin High. His mum is the new acting vice-principal and there is a lot at stake as the family hopes to make Bremin their permanent home. The day is off to a strange start as Luke sees über cool Heath carrying two chickens into the school, then nearly gets hit in the head with a soccer ball by the queen of the soccer team and all round academic super star, Niccolina 'Nicco' Pandelis. In the quadrangle Luke is met by Principal Bates who ropes Ben into showing Luke around. Luke soon realises that Ben is the school outsider and lacks any discernible social skills. In the school corridor Luke witnesses Jesse, budding star of stage and screen, and Brooklyn, the school's most popular, having a fight. It becomes clear to Luke that while Ben has a massive crush on Brooklyn, he has mistaken Brooklyn's politeness for a reciprocal attraction.
| 28 | 2 | "What Happened to Bremin?" | Rowan Woods | David Hannam | 11 November 2016 |
Back in Empty Bremin - a freaked out Luke, Nicco, Heath and Jesse comb the streets of Bremin for any sign of life. Phones aren't working, power isn't on, and water isn't running. Could this be the result of an alien abduction, zombie attack, a nuclear apocalypse, or a town-wide evacuation they somehow failed to hear? They head off in different directions, desperate to find parents and loved ones. But they're in for a nasty shock - Jesse's sister is gone and his home is for sale, and Nicco and Heath can't find any evidence that they ever existed! Strangest of all is Luke's house. When he left everything was still in boxes - but it's now fully furnished and looks like they've been living there for quite some time. Nicco heads off to school where she ransacks the Principal's office, but is unwilling to tell Heath what she's looking for.
| 29 | 3 | "We Are Not Alone" | Rowan Woods | Kris Mrksa | 18 November 2016 |
In the Empty World, the gang are living off junk food and Jesse is not looking very well - he has a secret. He has diabetes and he's down to his last insulin pen. Nicco knows about his medical history, but Jesse, who can't stand the idea of being indebted to her, will not accept any help. Similarly, he does not want to tell the rest of the gang because he wants to fit in. Unfortunately, the one place Jesse may be able to get insulin is the chemist, but it is locked tight. Knowing Jesse needs to have fresh water and not sugary drinks, Nicco orchestrates a trip to the Bremin River. At the river the gang find the hideout and it becomes clear someone has been living there - someone who has a book of magic spells and scrapbooks of strange events that never happened in the gang's world. Luke lands on the idea that maybe the gang has been transported to an alternate reality - this is not their Bremin!
| 30 | 4 | "The Gang Find Magic" | Craig Barden | Jo Bell | 25 November 2016 |
In the Empty World, Heath wakes to find Ben and Jesse gone. Fresh with the memory of last night's encounter with the dark matter, the gang arm themselves to go in search. They find Ben and Jesse in the secret lair and are amazed to find that not only is there a secret room inside the school, but it's full of magic books. Ben, who's read the books previously, tells them that for magic to work you need four elemental identities.
| 31 | 5 | "Bates to the Rescue" | Sian Davies | Giula Sandller | 2 December 2016 |
In the empty world, the gang are on the bus with Bates, keen to get away from the scene of the attack. Bates rationalises their story of the particle attack as severe weather and the kids are happy to let him take charge. But Luke spots Sonia by the side of the road. He calls out for Bates to stop and the bus screeches to a halt. Luke dives off, but there's no sign of Sonia anywhere. When they get back on the bus it will not start. As they walk back into town, Ben still wants to do the Dimensional Return Spell and Heath plucks a hair from Brooklyn's head. Brooklyn is furious, and in an attempt to smooth things over, Luke blurts out Heath needed her hair because she's his heart's desire. Heath's mortified and Luke finds himself on the outer.
| 32 | 6 | "Are We Home Yet?" | Sian Davies | David Hannam | 9 December 2016 |
The gang are on the oval having just been transported from the Empty World - it's a busy school day. The sun is shining, the birds are singing and our gang couldn't be happier.
| 33 | 7 | "The Trouble with Ben" | Sian Davies | Marieke Hardy | 16 December 2016 |
The gang perform the real Dimensional Return spell and they arrive back in the Real World. At first they see only an empty school, but then the bell sounds and school kids pour out of the front doors and onto the oval. The spell that sent them to the Empty World has been broken and the fabric of reality has been restored. Ben (Real World), who had become a cool kid, now finds himself back at the bottom of totem pole, Sonia is no longer Principal, and the SRC election poster changes from Sarah back to Brooklyn.
| 34 | 8 | "Back to the Empty World" | Sian Davies | Marieke Hardy | 23 December 2016 |
The gang are in an uproar immediately after the Bens have disappeared, trying to work out what the hell happened to them and the Talisman. Meanwhile, in the Empty World, Ben (RW) is totally freaked out and Ben (EW) is furious, wanting nothing to do with Ben (RW). Ben (RW) doesn't understand what has happened or where all the people of Bremin have gone. As night falls, Ben (EW) hurries to the school - he wants Ben (RW) to keep the hell away from him. To make matters worse, the Empty World is deteriorating with regular earth tremors.
| 35 | 9 | "The Truth Spell" | Nicholas Verso | Jessica Brookman | 30 December 2016 |
It's a new day and the gang are playing with their elemental powers at school, but when Luke returns from checking on frozen Ben (RW), he freaks - they need to keep magic a secret. The gang worry about what will happen if Ben (RW) wakes up, fearing they will not be able to tell the two Bens apart. But Ben (EW) has a solution, they perform a truth spell on him, and they'll always be able to tell. Heath tries to read the spell but he mixes up the words. The others don't notice and believe the spell was a fail. Later in class, Heath is questioned by Bates and finds himself uncontrollably blurting out all of his bad behaviour.
| 36 | 10 | "Unwanted Visitors" | Nicholas Verso | Rhys Graham | 6 January 2017 |
On the way to school Jesse gets a call from the Bremin Amateur Musical Theatre Society - he has an audition and he's sure this is going to be his big break. Fresh from their fight with the Mini Demons, the gang try to work out what they are. When Jesse arrives they ask if he checked on Ben (RW), but Jesse forgot - he's got to get busy preparing for his audition.
| 37 | 11 | "The Search for Atridax" | Nicholas Verso | David Hannam | 13 January 2017 |
While Luke is held at the Police Station, Heath, Jesse and Nicco discover the bags holding the mini demons have disappeared. They need the Scrying Pool to find them, but can't use the magic without Luke. With the clock ticking, and fears growing about what havoc the Atridax might cause while AWOL, the gang sneak Luke out. There is a hiccup with the Scrying Pool, but the teens unscramble a valuable lead and realise that the Atridax are at the Police Station.
| 38 | 12 | "Birth of the Mega Demon" | Rowan Woods | Kris Mrksa | 20 January 2017 |
The gang race to the hideout to confirm their worst fears - that Ben (RW) is awake and has stolen the four Atridax. Things only get worse when Nicco discovers she's lost the talisman. Desperate to find it, the gang decides to use the scrying pool, the only spell they can do without the talisman, in a hope to find it. But the images are incomprehensible - the only thing clear is the colour red.
| 39 | 13 | "The Battle for Bremin" | Rowan Woods | Giula Sandller | 27 January 2017 |
As the gang, having recovered Kayla from the egg, begins to take her home, Sonia arrives and Luke has no choice but to go with her. Sonia asks Luke to tell her what is going on with him. Luke can't, and as Sonia expresses her disappointment, she disappears. Luke, panicked, races for his Dad, but he too suddenly disappears. The Mega Demon appears and enraged Luke tries to attack him but his powers are gone.

=== Series 4: Battle for Negative Space (2018) ===
| No. overall | No. in season | Title | Directed by | Written by | Original release date |
|---|---|---|---|---|---|
| 40 | 1 | "We Are Not Alone Anymore" | Nicholas Verso | David Hannam | 3 December 2018 |
TBA
| 41 | 2 | "Secrets, Lies, and Parasites" | Nicholas Verso | Jessica Brookman | 4 December 2018 |
TBA
| 42 | 3 | "Lost in Negative Space" | Nicholas Verso | David Hannam | 5 December 2018 |
TBA
| 43 | 4 | "The Cool Guy" | Marieke Hardy and Beth King | Nicholas Verso | 6 December 2018 |
TBA
| 44 | 5 | "Stranger Danger" | Sian Davies | Jessica Brookman and Beth King | 7 December 2018 |
TBA
| 45 | 6 | "Mistaken Id-entity" | Sian Davies | Marieke Hardy | 8 December 2018 |
TBA
| 46 | 7 | "Keep Your Friends Close" | Sian Davies | Beth King, Jason Christou and Erin Bretherton | 9 December 2018 |
TBA
| 47 | 8 | "Off The Map" | Goran Stolevski | Jessica Brookman | 10 December 2018 |
TBA
| 48 | 9 | "Double Trouble" | Goran Stolevski | Marieke Hardy, Jason Christou and Erin Bretherton | 11 December 2018 |
TBA
| 49 | 10 | "Attack of the Nematodes" | Goran Stolevski | David Hannam | 12 December 2018 |
TBA
| 50 | 11 | "The Chosen One" | Catriona McKenzie | David Hannam | 13 December 2018 |
Everyone returns from the Alternate world. Bates films them doing magic, and is prevented from telling the authorities by a Binding Spell. Ellen and Ben tell the Elementals about the Guardian. Zeb is contacted in Negative Space and tells the gang that the Guardian has to be activated to be fully realized. Heath hooks Jesse up with Darius. Luke prepares to say Goodbye. The Real Guardian is revealed.
| 51 | 12 | "The Alternate World is Here" | Catriona McKenzie | Craig Irvin | 14 December 2018 |
TBA
| 52 | 13 | "The Entity Face Off" | Catriona McKenzie | Craig Irvin | 15 December 2018 |
TBA
