= 2007 Australian Film Institute Awards =

Australian film and TV awards ceremony

49th Australian Film Institute Awards
- Date: 5–6 December 2007
- Site: Melbourne Convention and Exhibition Centre
- Hosted by: Geoffrey Rush

Highlights
- Best Film: Romulus, My Father
- Best Direction: Tony Ayres; The Home Song Stories
- Best Actor: Eric Bana; Romulus, My Father
- Best Actress: Joan Chen; The Home Song Stories
- Supporting Actor: Marton Csokas; Romulus, My Father
- Supporting Actress: Emma Booth; Clubland
- Most awards: The Home Song Stories (8)
- Most nominations: Romulus, My Father (15)

Television coverage
- Network: Nine Network

The 49th Australian Film Institute Awards ceremony, honoring the best in film and television of 2007, was held at the Melbourne Convention and Exhibition Centre and broadcast on the Nine Network. Geoffrey Rush hosted the event for the second year in succession.

The nominees were announced on 24 October 2007 at the Sydney Theatre, Walsh Bay. Deborra-Lee Furness, Sibylla Budd, Marny Kennedy, and AFI President James Hewison made the announcements. Romulus, My Father received the highest number of nominations, with a total of fifteen. The Home Song Stories had the second highest number with twelve and Clubland the third highest, with eleven.

The award winners were announced at two ceremonies; one on 5 December ("industry" categories) and the other on 6 December (top categories), 2007. Films that won multiple Australian Film Institute Awards include The Home Song Stories with a grand total of 8 and Romulus, My Father with a tally of 4.

The Home Song Stories performed exceptionally well, winning in 8 of its 12 nominated categories. The wins included, Best Direction (Tony Ayres), Best Actress in a Lead Role (Joan Chen), Best Screenplay (Tony Ayres), Achievement in Cinematogoraphy (Nigel Bluck), Achievement in Editing (Denise Haratzis), Best Original Score (Antony Partos), Best Achievement in Production Design (Melinda Doring) and the award for Achievement in Costume Design (Cappi Ireland).

== Winners and nominees ==
Winners are listed first and highlighted in boldface; with nominees thereafter.

=== Feature Film ===
**Best Film**: **Romulus, My Father –** **Robert Connolly, John Maynard**; Noise – Trevor Blainey; Lucky Miles – Jo Dyer, Lesly Dyer; The Home Song Stories – Liz Watts, Michael McMahon	**Best Direction**: **Tony Ayres – The Home Song Stories**; Cherie Nowlan – Clubland; Matthew Saville – Noise; Richard Roxburgh – Romulus, My Father
Best Screenplay (Original or Adapted)
**Tony Ayres – The Home Song Stories**; Keith Thompson – Clubland; Helen Barnes, Michael James Rowland – Lucky Miles; Mathew Saville – Noise; Nick Drake – Romulus, My Father
Best Lead Actor	Best Lead Actress
**Eric Bana – Romulus, My Father**; Brendan Cowell – Noise; Joel Lok – The Home Song Stories; Kodi Smit-McPhee – Romulus, My Father	**Joan Chen – The Home Song Stories**; Kerry Armstrong – Razzle Dazzle: A Journey into Dance; Brenda Blethyn – Clubland; Franka Potente – Romulus, My Father
Best Supporting Actor	Best Supporting Actress
**Marton Csokas – Romulus, My Father**; Frankie J. Holden – Clubland; Richard Wilson – Clubland; Russell Dykstra – Romulus, My Father	**Emma Booth – Clubland**; Esme Melville – Romulus, My Father; Sibylla Budd – The Bet; Irene Chen – The Home Song Stories
Best Cinematography	Best Editing
**Nigel Bluck – The Home Song Stories**; Mark Wareham ACS – Clubland; Laszlo Baranyai ACS – Noise; Geoffrey Simpson ACS – Romulus, My Father	**Denise Haratzis ASE – The Home Song Stories**; Scott Gray – Clubland; Geoff Hitchins – Noise; Suresh Ayyar ASE – Romulus, My Father
Best Original Music Score	Best Sound
**Antony Partos – The Home Song Stories**; Byrony Marks – Noise; Roger Mason, Green Dragon – Razzle Dazzle: A Journey into Dance; Basil Hogios – Romulus, My Father	**Emma Bortignon, Doron Kipen, Philippe Decrausaz – Noise**; Andrew Neil, Ian McLoughlin CAS, Liam Egan, Stephen Jackson-Vaughan – Clubland; Sam Petty, Gary Wilkins CAS, Phil Heywood – Romulus, My Father; Craig Carter, James Harvey, Andrew Neil, John Wilkinson – The Home Song Stories
Best Production Design	Best Costume Design
**Melinda Doring – The Home Song Stories**; Nell Hanson – Clubland; Paddy Reardon – Noise; Robert Cousins – Romulus, My Father	**Cappi Ireland – The Home Song Stories**; Emily Seresin – Clubland; Ariane Weiss – Razzle Dazzle: A Journey into Dance; Jodie Fried – Romulus, My Father

=== Television ===
**Best Drama Series**: **Love My Way: Series 3 – John Edwards, Claudia Karvan (Foxtel)**; All Saints: Series 10 – Bill Hughes, MaryAnne Carroll (Seven Network); Dangerous – John Edwards, Imogen Banks (Foxtel)	**Best Miniseries or Telefeature**: **The King – Jason Stephens (TV1)**; Bastard Boys – Brett Popplewell, Ray Quint (ABC); The Circuit – Ross Hutchens, Colin South (SBS)
**Best Comedy Series**: **Wilfred – Jenny Livingston (SBS)**; The Chaser's War on Everything: Series 2 – Andy Nehl, Julian Morrow, Jo Wathen (ABC); David Tench Tonight – Todd Abbott (Network Ten); Supernova: Series 2 – David Maher, David Taylor (Foxtel)	**Best Light Entertainment Television Series**: **RocKwiz – Brian Nankervis, Ken Connor, Peter Bain-Hogg, Joe Connor (SBS)**; The New Inventors – Anita Jorgensen (ABC); Spicks and Specks – Anthony Watt, Bruce Kane (ABC); The Sideshow with Paul McDermott – Ted Robinson, Pam Swain, Megan Harding (ABC)
**Children's Television Drama**: **Lockie Leonard – Kylie du Fresne (Nine Network)**; I Got a Rocket – Suzanne Ryan (Network Ten); The Adventures of Bottle Top Bill and His Best Friend Corky – Jacqueline Chan, Noel Price (ABC); The Sleepover Club: Series 2 – Susie Campbell (Nine Network)	**Best Direction in Television**: **The King – Mathew Saville (TV1)**; Bastard Boys – Ray Quint (ABC); Lockie Leonard: Episode 5 "Cyril" – Tony Tilse (Nine Network); The Circuit: Episode 6 "Home is Where the Past is" – Richard Frankland (SBS); Wilfred: Episode 3 "Dogs of War" – Tony Rogers (SBS)
**Best Lead Actor – Drama**: **Stephen Curry – The King (TV1)**; Daniel Frederiksen – Bastard Boys (ABC); Khan Chittenden – Dangerous (Foxtel); Ben Mendelsohn – Love My Way: Series 3 (Foxtel)	**Best Lead Actress – Drama**: **Claudia Karvan – Love My Way: Series 3 (Foxtel)**; Catherine McClements – Call Me Mum (SBS); Noni Hazlehurst – Stepfather of the Bride (ABC); Tammy Clarkson – The Circuit (SBS)
**Best Guest or Supporting Actor – Drama**: **David Ngoombujarra – The Circuit (SBS)**; Mark Priestley – All Saints: Series 10 (Seven Network); Jack Thompson – Bastard Boys (ABC); Justin Smith – Bastard Boys (ABC)	**Best Guest or Supporting Actress – Drama**: **Vicki Saylor – Call Me Mum (SBS)**; Lynette Curran – Call Me Mum (SBS); Justine Clarke – Love My Way: Series 3 (Foxtel); Monica Maughan – The King (TV1)
**Best Performance in a Television Comedy**: **Adam Zwar – Wilfred (SBS)**; Drew Forsythe – David Tench Tonight (Network Ten); Peter Kowitz – Supernova: Series 2 (Foxtel); Jason Gann – Wilfred (SBS)	**Best Screenplay in Television**: **Bastard Boys – Sue Smith (ABC)**; Lockie Leonard: Episode 15 'The Ladder of Love' – Keith Thompson (Nine Network); Love My Way: Series 3, Episode 6 "Cars Without Brakes" – Tony McNamara (Foxtel); The Circuit: Episode 6 "Home is Where the Past is" – Kelly Lefever (SBS)

==== AFI Award for Outstanding Achievement in Television Screen Craft ====
- **Paddy Reardon –** Bastard Boys 'Call Me Mum & The King'. For "Production Design"

=== Non-Feature Film ===
Best Documentary	Best Direction in a Documentary
**Forbidden Lie$** **– Sally Regan, Anna Broinowski**; 4 – Joanna Buggy, Tim Slade; Global Haywire – Claude Gonzalez; Words From The City – Philippa Campey	**Global Haywire – Bruce Petty**; Crude – Richard Smith; Forbidden Lie$ – Anna Broinowski; Words From The City – Rhys Graham, Natasha Gadd
Best Cinematography in a Documentary	Best Editing in a Documentary
**Cuttlefish: The Brainy Bunch – Malcom Ludgate, Joel Peterson, Scott Carrithers**; 4 – Pieter de Vries; Thunderheads – Klaus Toft, Cameron Davies, Mark Lamble; Words From The City – Rhys Graham, Natasha Gadd	Forbidden Lie$ – Vanessa Milton, Alison Croft; Cuttlefish: The Brainy Bunch – Carsten Orit; Global Haywire – Sam Petty; Words From The City – Paul Williams
Best Sound in a Documentary	Best Short Fiction Film
**Global Haywire – Sam Petty**; Cuttlefish: The Brainy Bunch – Sam Hayward; Forbidden Lie$ – Peter Smith, Craig Carter; Words From The City – Peter Smith, Emma Bortignon	**Spike Up – Anthony Maras, Kent Smith**; Boy's Own Story – Michael Petroni, Jamie Hilton; Dugong – Melanie Brunt, Erin White; Swing – Louise Pascale, Christopher Houghton
Best Short Animation	Best Screenplay in a Short Film
**The Girl Who Swallowed Bees – Justine Kerrigan, Paul McDermott**; An Imaginary Life – Steve Baker; Dust Echoes 2: "The Bat And The Butterfly" – Michael Wagner, Dave Jones; The Goat That Ate Time – Lucinda Schreiber	**Crossbow – David Michôd**; Boy's Own Story – Michael Petroni; Dugong – Erin White; Katoomba – Leon Ford

==== AFI Award for Outstanding Achievement in Short Film Screen Craft ====
- **Mark Lapwood ACS.** Eclipse. For "Cinematography"

=== Additional Awards ===
International Award for Excellence in Filmmaking	News Limited Readers' Choice Award
**Jill Bilcock**, editor	**Eric Bana**
Best Young Actor	Best Visual Effects
**Kodi Smit-McPhee – Romulus, My Father**; Corey McKernan – Lockie Leonard (Series 1); Irene Chen – The Home Song Stories; Joel Lok – The Home Song Stories	**Rogue – Andrew Hellen, Dave Morley, Jason Bath, John Cox**; Air Australia: Canvas & Sticks – David Rutherford, Reigy Skwarko, Paul Siciliano, Delon Govender; Crocodile Dreaming – Kirsty Millar, Chad Malbon; Spider – Mike Seymour
International Award for Best Actor	International Award for Best Actress
**Dominic Purcell – Prison Break**; Eric Bana – Lucky You; Julian McMahon – Nip/Tuck; Hugh Jackman – The Prestige	**Rose Byrne – Damages**; Rachel Griffiths – Brothers & Sisters; Toni Collette – Little Miss Sunshine; Jacinda Barrett – The Last Kiss

=== Individual Awards ===
Award	Winner
Byron Kennedy Award	**Curtis Levy**
Raymond Longford Award	**David Hannay**
AFI Global Achievement Award	**George Miller**
AFI Fellowship	**Nick Barkla**

== Multiple nominations ==
The following films received multiple nominations.

- 15 nominations: Romulus, My Father
- 12 nominations: The Home Song Stories
- 11 nominations: Clubland
- 9 nominations: Noise
- 3 nominations: Razzle Dazzle: A Journey into Dance
