= Rahart Adams =

Australian actor

Rahart Sadiqzai-Adams
- Born: Rahart Sadiqzai; 1 February 1996 (age 30); Australia
- Occupation: Actor
- Years active: 2013–present

Rahart Sadiqzai-Adams is an Australian actor. After first appearing in commercials and a guest role in Neighbours, he played a lead in Nowhere Boys and then joined the cast of Every Witch Way (2014–2015). Other major roles include Nickelodeon's comedy film Liar, Liar, Vampire (2015), Emo the Musical, Star Light in 2020 and the YouTube Original series Foursome from season 2. Adams has a regular role in the CW TV series Gotham Knights (2023).

== Early life and education ==
He is the second oldest of four children of Adam and Victoria Adams. His parents are of Maltese and Pakistani heritage. Adams attended Haileybury College and studied Media and Business Studies.

== Career ==
Adams has appeared on television shows such as Neighbours, Talia in the Kitchen, House Husbands and Discover Indie Film. In 2013, Adams was known for his roles such as Sam Conte in the action teen drama series Nowhere Boys opposite Dougie Baldwin, Joel Lok and Matt Testro. In 2014, Adams was selected to play Jax Novoa in the Nickelodeon teen sitcom Every Witch Way, stars Paola Andino. He starred in the comedy family film Liar, Liar, Vampire alongside Brec Bassinger and Tiera Skovbye, which was released on 12 October 2015 through Nickelodeon.

In 2016, Adams co-starred with Dougie Baldwin, Joel Lok, Matt Testro, Sean Rees-Wemyss and Angourie Rice in the dark fantasy teen drama film Nowhere Boys: The Book of Shadows, based on the teen-oriented television series Nowhere Boys created by Tony Ayres. He played the role of Kent Saydak in the romantic comedy series Foursome. Adams portrayed Bradley, leader of the Emo clique, in the feature film Emo the Musical, which was directed by Neil Triffett, opposite Benson Jack Anthony and Jordan Hare.

In 2018, Adams played multiple roles in the science fiction monster film Pacific Rim Uprising, including that of Cadet Tahima Shaheen. In the 2019 short film, Nancy, he played the character of Ryan. In the 2020 horror film Star Light, stars Cameron Johnson, Scout Taylor-Compton, Bret Roberts, Garrett Westton and Liana Ramirez, directed by Mitchell Altieri, in which he played the character of Nick, which was first shown at the Hollywood Reel Independent Film Festival in February 2020.

In Michael Matteo Rossi's film Shadows starring Krista Allen, Francis Capra and Vernon Wells, he played the role of Cody. In 2023, Adams was cast to play the main role in the action superhero series Gotham Knights along with Oscar Morgan and Olivia Rose Keegan, where he played the main role of Brody March, the son of Lincoln March (Damon Dayoub) and a fellow student at Gotham Academy.

== Filmography ==
=== Film ===
Year	Title	Role	Notes
2016	Nowhere Boys: The Book of Shadows	Sam Conte	
2016	Emo the Musical	Bradley	
2018	Pacific Rim Uprising	Cadete Tahima	
2019	Nancy	Ryan	Short film
2020	Star Light	Nick	
2022	Shadows	Cody	

=== Television ===
Year	Title	Role	Notes
2013	Neighbours	Alistair O'Laughlin	4 episodes
2013–2015	Nowhere Boys	Sam Conte	Main role (seasons 1–2)
2014–2015	Every Witch Way	Jax Novoa	Main role (seasons 2–4)
2015	Talia in the Kitchen	Jax Novoa	Episode: "Every Witch Lola's"
2015	Liar, Liar Vampire	Davis Pell	Television film
2016–2018	Foursome	Kent Saydak	Main role
2017	House Husbands	Rafiq	5 episodes
2021	Discover Indie Film	Ryan (Nancy)	Episode: "Nancy & The Bus to Birra Birra"
2023	Gotham Knights	Brody March	Main role
