= Barracuda (TV series) =

Australian TV miniseries

- Genre: Miniseries
- Based on: Barracuda by Christos Tsiolkas
- Written by: Blake Ayshford; Belinda Chayko
- Directed by: Robert Connolly
- Starring: Elias Anton; Matt Nable; Ben Kindon; Rachel Griffiths; Tilda Cobham-Hervey; Andrew Creer; Victoria Haralabidou; Jeremy Lindsay Taylor; Joel Lok; Rhys Mitchell; Imran Adams; Joe Klocek
- Composer: Bryony Marks
- Country of origin: Australia
- Original language: English
- No. of episodes: 4

Production
- Producers: Tony Ayres; Amanda Higgs
- Cinematography: Stefan Duscio
- Editor: Rodrigo Balart
- Production company: Matchbox Pictures

Original release
- Network: ABC
- Release: 10 July – 31 July 2016

Barracuda is an Australian drama miniseries, first broadcast on ABC TV starting 10 July 2016. The series is based on Barracuda, the 2013 novel by Australian author Christos Tsiolkas.

Barracuda is written by Blake Ayshford and Belinda Chayko and directed by Robert Connolly. It is produced by Tony Ayres and Amanda Higgs with Christos Tsiolkas as associate producer. The series is a Matchbox Pictures production in association with ABC Television, Screen Australia and Film Victoria.

== Synopsis ==
In 1996, Danny Kelly is a talented swimmer who attends a prestigious Melbourne private school on a sporting scholarship. He is from a working-class background and is the target of harassment from more privileged students. Danny yearns to win swimming gold at the 2000 Summer Olympics. He is mentored by coach Frank Torma and develops a friendship and rivalry with teammate Martin Taylor.

== Cast ==
- Elias Anton as Danny Kelly
- Ben Kindon as Martin Taylor
- Matt Nable as Frank Torma
- Rachel Griffiths as Samantha Taylor
- Andrew Blackman as Mr Taylor
- Jeremy Lindsay Taylor as Neal Kelly
- Victoria Haralabidou as Stephanie Kelly
- Tilda Cobham-Hervey as Emma Taylor
- Andrew Creer as Wilco
- Jacob Collins-Levy as Clyde
- Joel Lok as Luke Tran
- Rhys Mitchell as Scooter
- Imran Adams as Theo Kelly
- Luca Sardelis as Regan Kelly
- Joe Klocek as Tsitsas
- Damon Gameau as Ben Whitter
- Helen Morse as Margot

== Episodes ==
No. overall	No. in season	Title	Directed by	Written by	Original release date	Australian viewers (Note: All episodes were made available to stream on ABC iview following the debut episode's television premiere. Viewership numbers include consolidated 7 day figures.)
1	1	"Episode 1" or "1996"	Robert Connolly	Blake Ayshford	10 July 2016	630,000
Transferring to an exclusive school on a swimming scholarship, Danny's ambitions for pool glory are met with racist hostility, especially from the swim squad's gold-winner.
2	2	"Episode 2" or "1997"	Robert Connolly	Belinda Chayko	17 July 2016	557,000
Danny welcomes the distraction of being introduced into the Taylor family's well-to-do world on a weekend away, before preparations for the National Championships begin.
3	3	"Episode 3" or "1998"	Robert Connolly	Blake Ayshford	24 July 2016	521,000
With the world stage in Kuala Lumpur awaiting him, Danny ignores the advice of his mentor and family, seeking the necessary edge from a fresh approach.
4	4	"Episode 4" or "2000"	Robert Connolly	Belinda Chayko	31 July 2016	514,000
The consequences of Danny's blinkered determination play out, as a moment of rage risks ending a fond friendship, threatening to derail his life forever.

== Broadcast ==
Internationally, the series was acquired in the United Kingdom by BBC Three, in South Africa by Dstv and Skai TV in Greece.
