= Barracuda (novel) =

2013 novel by Australian author Christos Tsiolkas

- Author: Christos Tsiolkas
- Language: English
- Genre: Novel
- Publisher: Allen & Unwin (Australia); Penguin (U.S./U.K.)
- Publication date: 26 October 2013
- Publication place: Australia
- Media type: Print
- Pages: 516 pp.
- ISBN: 9781743317310

Barracuda is the seventh novel by Australian author Christos Tsiolkas. Released on 26 October 2013 by Allen & Unwin, it was the follow-up to Tsiolkas' award-winning breakthrough 2008 novel The Slap. The story is told across two time periods in alternating chapters, chronicling the teenage years of swimmer Danny Kelly at a prestigious Melbourne high school in the 1990s, and an older Danny's life in Glasgow following his release from prison.

== Premise ==
Set from 1996, Danny Kelly is a talented swimmer who attends a prestigious Melbourne private school on a sporting scholarship. Working class, half Greek and half Irish, he is the target of harassment from the privileged students. Danny yearns to win swimming gold at the 2000 Sydney Olympic Games. He is taken under the wing of highly regarded coach Frank Torma and develops a friendship/rivalry with teammate Martin Taylor which inspires Danny to become a world record holder.

== Reception ==
=== Awards and nominations ===
Year	Organisation	Category	Result	Ref.
2014	Australian Book Industry Awards	Literary Fiction	Nominated	
2014	Voss Literary Prize		Nominated	
2015	Lambda Literary Awards	Gay Fiction	Nominated	

== Adaptation ==
Barracuda was adapted into a four episode television miniseries which aired on ABC TV from 10 to 31 July 2016. The series was written by Blake Ayshford and Belinda Chayko, and directed by Robert Connolly, with Tsiolkas as an associate producer. It was a Matchbox Pictures production in association with ABC Television, Screen Australia, and Film Victoria. It starred Elias Anton as Danny Kelly, Ben Kindon as Martin Taylor, and Matt Nable as Frank Torma.
