= Nowhere Boys =

2013 Australian television series

- Opening title
- Genre: Action; Adventure; Fantasy
- Created by: Tony Ayres
- Directed by: Daina Reid; Peter Carstairs; Craig Irvin; Nicholas Verso; Brendan Phillips; Alister Grierson; Peter Salmon; Rachel Griffiths
- Starring: Dougie Baldwin; Joel Lok; Rahart Adams; Matt Testro; Kamil Ellis; Joe Klocek; Jordie Race-Coldrey; Luca Sardelis; William McKenna
- Theme music composer: Cornel Wilczek
- Opening theme: Nowhere Boys Theme
- Composer: Cornel Wilczek
- Country of origin: Australia
- Original language: English
- No. of series: 4
- No. of episodes: 52 (+ 1 film) (list of episodes)

Production
- Executive producers: Michael McMahon; Helen Panckhurst; Tony Ayres (season 2)
- Producers: Tony Ayres (season 1); Beth Frey
- Cinematography: Simon Chapman (season 1); Dave Cameron (season 2)
- Running time: 26 minutes
- Production company: Matchbox Pictures

Original release
- Network: ABC Entertains
- Release: 7 November 2013 – 15 December 2018

Nowhere Boys is an Australian teen drama fantasy television series created by Tony Ayres. It was first broadcast on ABC3 on 7 November 2013. The first two series follow the adventures of four mismatched teenage boys – goth Felix Ferne (Dougie Baldwin), nerd Andrew "Andy" Lau (Joel Lok), golden child Sam Conte (Rahart Adams), and alpha jock Jake Riles (Matt Testro). Nowhere Boys was renewed for a second series which began airing from 23 November 2014. An 80-minute feature-length movie based on the show, titled Nowhere Boys: The Book of Shadows, premiered in selected Australian movie theatres on 1 January 2016. A third series of Nowhere Boys, titled Two Moons Rising, started airing in 2016 with a new cast and characters, replacing the original cast members. The fourth and final series, titled Battle For Negative Space, started airing on 3 December 2018.

== Premise ==
Series	Episodes	Originally released	
Series	Episodes	First released	Last released
1	13	7 November 2013	30 January 2014
2	13	23 November 2014	8 February 2015
Film		1 January 2016	
3	13	11 November 2016	27 January 2017
4	13	3 December 2018	15 December 2018

Series 1 and 2: After returning home from a school excursion, four boys, Felix Ferne, Andy Lau, Sam Conte, and Jake Riles, find themselves in an alternate reality where no one recognises them. They battle mystical threats and demons to find their way back home.

One week after the boys return home, they discover they have special elemental powers. Thinking they otherwise are at peace, they discover they weren't the only ones who crossed over from the alternate reality.

Series 3 and 4: When new student Luke attends Bremin High, he encounters Ben, Heath, Nicco and Jesse. Together they have to use their special powers to fight a creature they call the "Mega-Demon".

== Cast and characters ==
Actor	Character	Seasons			
Actor	Character	1	2	3	4
Main
Dougie Baldwin	Felix Ferne	Main	Main		
Joel Lok	Andrew "Andy" Lau	Main	Main		
Rahart Adams	Sam Conte	Main	Main		
Matt Testro	Jake Riles	Main	Main		Recurring
Kamil Ellis	Luke Hamill			Main	Main
Joe Klocek	Heath Buckland			Main	Main
Jordie Race-Coldrey	Jesse Banda			Main	Main
Luca Sardelis	Niccolina "Nicco" Pandelis			Main	Main
William McKenna	Ben Ripley			Main	Main
Notable supporting cast
Sean Rees-Wemyss	Oscar Ferne	Recurring	Recurring		
Darci McDonald	Ellen O'Donnell	Recurring	Recurring	Recurring	Recurring
Michala Banas	Phoebe Hartley	Recurring	Recurring		
Tamala Shelton	Mia	Recurring	Recurring		
Cecilia Tan	Lily "Nai-Nai" Lau	Recurring	Recurring		
Michelle Gerster	Viv Lau	Recurring	Recurring		
Anthony Brandon Wong	Michael Lau	Recurring	Recurring		
Libby Tanner	Sarah Riles	Recurring	Recurring		
Damien Richardson	Gary Riles	Recurring	Recurring		
Heidi Arena	Kathy Ferne	Recurring	Recurring		
Nicholas Coghlan	Brian Bates	Recurring	Recurring	Recurring	Recurring
Jim Russell	Roland Murphy	Recurring	Recurring		Recurring
Simon Mallory	Roberts	Recurring	Recurring	Recurring	Recurring
Victoria Thaine	Alice Hartley	Recurring	Recurring		
Phoebe Roberts	Saskia Boom		Recurring		
Laura Grady	Brooklyn Wansbrough			Recurring	
Charmaine Chu	Peta Chen			Recurring	Recurring
Shareena Clanton	Sonia Jarra			Recurring	Recurring
Tegan Higginbotham	Quinn Banda			Recurring	Recurring
Stella Carroll	Kayla Pandelis			Recurring	Recurring
Fin van de Wall	Claude Topper			Recurring	Recurring
Piath Mathiang	Zara Bello				Recurring
Joel Ma	Zeb				Recurring
Texas Watterston	Darius Regem				Recurring

== Production ==
=== Development ===
On 26 October 2011, it was announced that Matchbox Pictures and producers of The Slap were developing a thirteen-part youth-oriented drama series for the ABC called The Lost Boys. Due to copyright reasons, the show's name was later changed to Nowhere Boys. The series creator Tony Ayres conceived the idea for Nowhere Boys after learning that the ABC, which had already enjoyed success with Dance Academy, was looking for a new series that would appeal to boys. Ayres developed Nowhere Boys with a range of writers, including Roger Monk and Craig Irvin. He became the show's producer and showrunner alongside Beth Frey, while Michael McMahon and Helen Panckhurst served as the executive producers. Panckhurst left her position as executive producer at the end of the first series.

The first series of Nowhere Boys was financed with the assistance of the Australian Children's Television Foundation, Film Victoria, ABC3 and Screen Australia. Filming took place in Melbourne, Victoria from 18 February 2013 to 23 May 2013. Episode one was filmed at the primary school and Were Street in Montmorency, Victoria, as well as the skate park and high school in Greensborough, Victoria. The first four episodes premiered at the Melbourne International Film Festival in August 2013.

On 4 April 2014, it was announced that Nowhere Boys had received funding from Film Victoria for a second series to consist of thirteen episodes. It was financed with the assistance of ABC Television, Film Victoria and the BBC. Frey returned as producer and McMahon returned as executive producer. Ayres took over Panckhurst's position as executive producer. Filming for the second series commenced in Melbourne from 7 July 2014 to 17 September 2014. Actress Rachel Griffiths made her debut as a television director during series two. In November 2015, ABC announced that a third series of Nowhere Boys would premiere in 2016 with a new cast and characters, replacing the original cast members. Filming for the third series began in May 2016. The storyline for the third series picks up several years after the events of the second series. On 19 June 2017, Film Victoria announced funding for a fourth series. It consisted of 13 episodes. Filming for the fourth season began 25 January 2018.

=== Casting ===
In April 2013, it was announced that Dougie Baldwin, Joel Lok, Rahart Adams, and Matt Testro were cast as the four teenage boys. Lok portrays Andy, a geek of Singaporean descent who loves science and Bear Grylls. Ayres, who previously worked with Lok on The Home Song Stories (2007), revealed that he had him in mind for the role of Andy. Testro plays alpha jock Jake and Adams plays the skater boy Sam. Testro said that he and Adams both auditioned six times for the roles of Jake and Sam, with both originally auditioning for each other's characters. Baldwin stars as Felix, a Goth who has an interest in magic. Sean Rees-Wemyss was cast as Felix's younger brother Oscar, a disabled social outcast who is bullied at school. Rees-Wemyss revealed that he initially auditioned for the role of Felix but the directors felt he was too young for the part. Darci McDonald plays Felix's best friend Ellen. Tamala Shelton plays Sam's popular girlfriend Mia and Michala Banas plays the mysterious magic shop owner Phoebe. Libby Tanner and Damien Richardson were cast as Jake's parents Sarah and Gary, and Heidi Arena was cast as Felix's mother Kathy.

In November 2015, it was announced that the third series would feature a new cast and characters that would replace the original cast members. Kamil Ellis, William McKenna, Jordie Race-Coldrey, Joe Klocek and Luca Sardelis were revealed as the new cast members in May 2016. Ellis portrays "tech-nerd and sci-fi enthusiast" Luke, McKenna plays the role of Ben, Race-Coldrey plays "musical theatre geek" Jesse, and Klocek portrays "the school's bad boy" Heath. Sardelis was cast as the show's first "Nowhere Girl", Nicco.

== Reception ==
=== Critical response ===
Nowhere Boys received generally positive reviews. David Knox of TV Tonight awarded Nowhere Boys 3.5 out of 5 stars and stated that the series "is so well produced and performed." Knox went on to say that "it's great to see a fully-fledged ABC3 production with male leads" following "a number of female-skewed projects" such as Dance Academy and Dead Gorgeous. He concluded, "Nowhere Boys hits its mark from the outset with a clever mix of drama and mystery." Rebecca Marshall of the Sunshine Coast Daily noted that the series features "a fascinating mix of fantasy, mystery, dark magic and drama" and commended "ABC for opening up opportunities for new-generation actors to hone their skills." The Sydney Morning Herald's Melinda Houston awarded Nowhere Boys 3 out of 4 stars and praised the "great talent behind the camera" which "gives the young actors plenty to work with." She concluded, "The result is bound to please its target audience and many more."

Myke Bartlett of The Weekly Review praised the script as "fast enough and funny enough to keep the kids hooked, with degrees of cleverness and subtlety likely to please a more mature palate." Bartlett concluded his review by stating that viewers finally have "a reason to watch ABC3." Luke Buckmaster of Crikey stated that after viewing the first four episodes, "both grown-ups and adolescents will find it addictive viewing." He also added, "it's good stuff: pacey and addictive yoof-tainment with snazzy packaging and a compelling 'what if' existential premise." News.com.au's Dianne Butler wrote that she enjoyed watching the first episode and described it as "funny and kind of disturbing."

=== Awards and nominations ===
Year	Award	Category	Nominee	Result
2014	AACTA Awards	Best Children's Television Series	Nowhere Boys	Won
2014	AACTA Awards	Best Original Music Score in Television	Series 1, Episode 1	Nominated
2014	Logie Awards	Most Outstanding Children's Program	Nowhere Boys	Won
2014	Australian Director's Guild Awards	Best Direction in a Children's TV Program	Peter Carstairs for Series 1, Episode 7	Nominated
2014	Australian Director's Guild Awards	Best Direction in a Children's TV Program	Craig Irvin for Series 1, Episode 8	Nominated
2014	Prix Jeunesse	12–15 Fiction/Non-Fiction	Nowhere Boys	Nominated
2014	Prix Jeunesse	International Youth Jury Prize	Nowhere Boys	Won
2014	Banff World Media Festival Rockie Awards	Youth Fiction	Nowhere Boys	Nominated
2014	AWGIE Awards	Children's Television	Craig Irvin for Series 1, Episode 3	Won
2014	Screen Producers Australia Awards	Children's Television Production of the Year	Nowhere Boys	Won
2014	Screen Producers Australia Awards	Interactive Production of the Year	Nowhere Boys: The 5th Boy	Nominated
2014	TV Tonight Awards	Best Kid's Show	Nowhere Boys	Won
2014	International Emmy Kids Awards	Best Series	Nowhere Boys	Nominated
2015	Kidscreen Awards	Best New Series – Tweens/Teens category	Nowhere Boys	Won
2015	iKids Awards	Best Website	Nowhere Boys: The 5th Boy	Won
2015	Logie Awards	Most Outstanding Children's Program	Nowhere Boys	Won
2015	Australian Director's Guild Awards	Best Direction in a Children's TV Program	Peter Salmon for Series 2, Episode 1	Nominated
2015	Australian Director's Guild Awards	Best Direction in a Children's TV Program	Craig Irvin for Series 2, Episode 7	Won
2015	Banff World Media Festival Rockie Awards	Youth Fiction	Nowhere Boys	Won
2015	AWGIE Awards	Children's Television – C Classification	Pete McTighe for Series 2, Episode 7	Nominated
2015	Screen Producers Australia Awards	Children's Television Production	Nowhere Boys	Won
2015	British Academy Children's Awards	International	Nowhere Boys	Nominated
2015	AACTA Awards	Best Children's TV	Nowhere Boys	Nominated
2016	International Emmy Kids Awards	Kids: Series	Nowhere Boys	Won
2016	British Academy Children's Awards	International	Nowhere Boys	Nominated

== Release ==
=== Broadcast ===
Nowhere Boys is sold in Australia and New Zealand by the Australian Children's Television Foundation. In Australia, the first series premiered on ABC3 on 7 November 2013 and ended on 30 January 2014. It aired on Thursday nights at 6:30 pm. The second series moved to Sunday nights at the same timeslot. It premiered simultaneously on ABC, ABC3 and ABC iview on 23 November 2014 with a double episode. On 31 December 2014, a special one-off mini episode that bridges episodes six to seven of series two was broadcast during ABC's New Year's Eve special.

=== International broadcasts ===
Nowhere Boys is sold internationally by NBCUniversal. On 28 April 2014, it was announced that the show had been acquired by the BBC for broadcast in the United Kingdom on their kids channel CBBC. The BBC also pre-bought series two. CBBC's Head of Acquisitions and Drama Development, Sarah Muller, stated "Nowhere Boys offers CBBC an amazing opportunity to acquire a really top-notch international drama from a world-class production company to complement our existing slate of UK-produced shows." The show premiered on CBBC on 1 September 2014. In Canada, episodes of Nowhere Boys began screening on the Family Channel in October 2015. In the US, the show has been revealed as part of the starting lineup of shows for the new network Universal Kids, which launched on 9 September 2017. Also, Netflix LATAM has this series on its catalogue since 2016, in original version with Spanish subtitles and dubbed to latinamerican Spanish.

== Other media ==
=== Home release ===
The first series of Nowhere Boys was released on DVD in Australia on 5 February 2014, six days after the series one finale aired on television. The second series DVD was released on 4 March 2015. The third series DVD was released 1 March 2017.

=== Online game ===
Nowhere Boys: The 5th Boy is an interactive online game that coincided with the first series. It was created by Matchbox Pictures and built by Melbourne-based online developers Millipede and released on the ABC3 website on 7 November 2013. The game allowed the player to take on the persona of a fifth "nowhere boy", who is lost in a strange world and has to try to find his way home. The platforms in Nowhere Boys: The 5th Boy were intertwined to give the player the feeling that they are directly in control of the direction of the television series. For example, when the player passed objects through the dimensions in the game, the object would appear in the show. These objects helped the Nowhere Boys on their mission and were often key to their survival.

=== Movie ===
On 23 December 2014, it was announced that Screen Australia would be funding a movie based on the television series titled, Nowhere Boys: The Rise of the Bear. However, in July 2015, it was revealed that the movie's name was changed to Nowhere Boys: The Book of Shadows. The 80-minute feature-length movie was directed by David Caesar and written by Tony Ayres, Rhys Graham and Craig Irvin. It was produced by Beth Frey and executive produced by Ayres and Michael McMahon. Nowhere Boys: The Book of Shadows picks up a year after the boys crossed dimensions, discovered magic and battled the restoring demon. Having grown apart, they are drawn together again when Felix discovers a magically sealed Book of Shadows, which unwittingly releases a powerful force of chaos. The boys are reluctantly drawn into a showdown that threatens their world and loved ones.

Dougie Baldwin, Joel Lok, Rahart Adams, Matt Testro, and Sean Rees-Wemyss reprised their roles as Felix, Andy, Sam, Jake, and Oscar. Others who also returned for the movie included series regulars Darci McDonald (Ellen), Michala Banas (Phoebe), Victoria Thaine (Alice), Ben Keller (Bear), Tamala Shelton (Mia) and Michelle Gerster (Viv). Angourie Rice also joined the cast. Nowhere Boys: The Book of Shadows began filming in Melbourne in July 2015. It screened in selected Australian movie theatres on 1 January 2016 and had its television premiere on ABC3 on 6 March 2016.
