= Matchbox Pictures =

Defunct Australian film and television production company

- Type: Subsidiary
- Industry: Television
- Genre: Television production
- Founded: 2008; 18 years ago
- Founders: Tony Ayres; Penny Chapman; Helen Bowden; Michael McMahon; Helen Panckhurst
- Defunct: 17 February 2026; 8 months ago
- Headquarters: Sydney, Australia
- Area served: Australia
- Key people: Alastair McKinnon (managing director)
- Services: Film and television program production
- Parent: Universal International Studios (2011–2026)
- Subsidiaries: Big & Little Films; Tony Ayres Productions
- Website: matchboxpictures.com

Matchbox Pictures was a film and television production company headquartered in Sydney with production houses in Sydney, Melbourne, and Singapore. It was formed in 2008 by Tony Ayres, Penny Chapman, Helen Bowden, Michael McMahon and Helen Panckhurst. In 2011, NBCUniversal took a majority stake in Matchbox Pictures, and full ownership by January 2014.

Matchbox Pictures was led by Alastair McKinnon (managing director), Matthew Vitins (COO), Debbie Lee (Director of Scripted Development), Penny Chapman (Producer), Helen Panckhurst (Head of Production), Michael McMahon (Producer), and Kate O'Connell (Finance Director).

On 16 July 2018, Matchbox Pictures and NBCUniversal backed co-founder Tony Ayres' new company, Tony Ayres Productions.

On 17 February 2026, Universal International Studios announced that Matchbox Pictures will cease operations.

== Film ==
- The Home Song Stories (2007)
- Saved (2009) (TV movie)
- Lou (2010)
- The Turning – Cockleshell (2013)
- Cut Snake (2014)
- Nowhere Boys: The Book of Shadows (2016)
- Ali's Wedding (2016)

== Television ==
Title	Network	Years	Notes
Anatomy	ABC TV	2008–2013	
Darwin's Lost Paradise	—N/a	2009	Documentary
Saved	—N/a	2009	Tele-movie
My Place	ABC Me	2009–2011	
Miss South Sudan Australia	ABC TV	2010	
Leaky Boat	ABC TV	2011	
Sex: An Unnatural History	SBS	2011	
The Slap	ABC TV	2011	
The Straits	ABC TV	2012	
Underground: The Julian Assange Story	Network Ten	2012	Tele-movie
Next Stop Hollywood	ABC TV	2013	
Camp	NBC	2013	co-production with BermanBraun, Selfish Mermaid and Universal Television
Formal Wars	Seven Network	2013	
Zuzu & the Supernuffs	KidsCo	2013	
Nowhere Boys	ABC Me	2013–2018	
Young, Lazy and Driving Us Crazy	Seven Network	2014	
Old School	ABC TV	2014	
Devil's Playground	Showcase	2014	
The Real Housewives of Melbourne	Fox Arena	2014–2021	
The Slap US	NBC	2015	co-production with Universal Television, P+M Image Nation and Scratchpad Productions
Room 101	SBS	2015	
Maximum Choppage	ABC TV Plus	2015	
Deadline Gallipoli	Fox Showcase	2015	Limited series. Co-production with Full Clip Productions
Glitch	ABC TV	2015–2019	Second season co-production with Netflix
The Family Law	SBS	2016–2019	
Wanted	Seven Network	2016–2018	co-production with R&R Productions
Secret City	Fox Showcase	2016–2019	
The Real Housewives of Auckland	Bravo	2016	
The Real Housewives of Sydney	Arena; Binge	2017, 2023–2025	
Mustangs FC	ABC Me	2017–2020	
Australian Spartan	Seven Network	2018–2019	
Safe Harbour	SBS	2018	
Everyone's a Critic	ABC TV	2018	
The Heights	ABC TV	2019–2020	co-production with For Pete's Sake Productions
Stateless	ABC TV	2020	
Hungry Ghosts	SBS	2020	
Young Rock	NBC	2021–2023	co-production with World Wrestling Entertainment, Grit & Superstition, Fierce Baby Productions, Seven Bucks Productions and Universal Television
Clickbait	Netflix	2021	Co-production with Tony Ayres Productions, Heyday Television and NBCUniversal International Studios
Making It Australia	Network 10	2021	co-production with Eureka Productions
Fires	ABC TV	2021	co-production with Tony Ayres Productions and NBCUniversal International Studios
La Brea	NBC	2021–2024	co-production with Bad Apple, Keshet Studios and Universal Television
Joe vs. Carole	Peacock	2022	co-production with Universal Content Productions and Wondery
Irreverent	Netflix; Peacock	2022	
Bad Behaviour	Stan	2023	
Class of '07	Amazon Prime Video	2023	
Turn Up the Volume	ABC Me	2023	co-production with Film Camp
House of Gods	ABC TV	2024	
