= Douglas Baldwin =

Douglas Baldwin may refer to:

- Doug Baldwin (born 1988), American football player
- Doug Baldwin (ice hockey) (1922–2007), Canadian hockey player
- Dougie Baldwin (born 1996), Australian actor
