= British Academy Children's Award for International =

British Academy Children and Young People Award for International
- Awarded for: The best television and online content where the editorial and creative control resides outside of the UK.
- Country: United Kingdom
- Presented by: British Academy of Film and Television Arts
- Currently held by: Bluey (2022)
- Website: www.bafta.org/children

The British Academy Children and Young People Award for International is an award presented annually by the British Academy of Film and Television Arts (BAFTA). It is given to "television and online content where the editorial and creative control resides outside of the UK". It was first presented at the 3rd British Academy Children's Awards in 1998, with Australian science-fiction television series Ocean Girl being the first recipient of the award. In 2018, three international categories were presented (Animation, Live-Action, Pre-School), while in 2019, two of the three were awarded (Animation and Live-Action). In 2022, the category returned to be only one category for international productions.

Out of the twenty-six winners, eighteen have been animated programs while eight have been live-action series. United States holds the records of the country with most wins in the category, with twenty of the winners being American productions or co-productions. Only three programs have won the award more than once: American series SpongeBob SquarePants holds the record of most wins with four followed by The Penguins of Madagascar and Adventure Time with two wins each. SpongeBob SquarePants is also the series with most nominations in the category with eight, followed by Phineas and Ferb with five, and Adventure Time and Doc McStuffins with four each.

== Winners and nominees ==
=== 1990s ===
Year	Program	Recipient(s)	Network	Country
1998 (3rd)	Ocean Girl	Jonathan M. Shiff	Network 10	Australia
1998 (3rd)	Investigate Your Living World	Edwin Wes		
1998 (3rd)	Living in Harmony	Lewis Berenstein, Daoud Kuttab, Dolly Wolbrum		
1998 (3rd)	Bananas in Pyjamas Special	Virginia Lumsden	ABC TV	Australia
1999 (4th)	Thunderstone	Jonathan M. Shiff	Network Ten	Australia
1999 (4th)	Goosebumps	Steven S. Levitan	YTV, Fox Kids	United States
1999 (4th)	Misery Guts	Jan Tyrrell	Nine Network	Australia
1999 (4th)	The Wayne Manifesto	Alan Hardy	ABC	Australia

=== 2000s ===
Year	Program	Recipient(s)	Network	Country
2000 (5th)	Pablo the Little Red Fox		CBBC, France 5	United Kingdom, France
2000 (5th)	Bear in the Big Blue House	Brian Henson, Mitchell Kriegman, Alex Rockwell	Playhouse Disney	United States
2000 (5th)	Hey Arnold!	Kurt Dumas, Frank Weiss	Nickelodeon	United States
2000 (5th)	Rolie Polie Olie	Corinne Kouper, Pamela Slavin	CBC Television, France 5, Disney Channel	Canada, France, United States
2001 (6th)	Teacher's Pet	Gary Baseman, Bill Steinkellner, Cheri Steinkellner	ABC	United States
2001 (6th)	Angela Anaconda	Neil Court, Steven DeNure, Beth Stevenson	Teletoon, Fox Family	Canada, United States
2001 (6th)	Animated Tales of the World: "Chief and the Carpenter"	Carl McMullin, Walter Tournier	HBO, S4C	United States, United Kingdom
2001 (6th)	Animated Tales of the World: "The Tyrant and the Child"	Aline Koala, Jiri Barta	HBO, S4C	United States, United Kingdom
2002 (7th)	Even Stevens	Matt Dearborn, Sean McNamara, David Brookwell	Disney Channel	United States
2002 (7th)	Angela Anaconda	Neil Court, Steven DeNure, Beth Stevenson	Teletoon, Fox Family	Canada, United States
2002 (7th)	Cubix		SBS, KBS	South Korea
2002 (7th)	Lizzie McGuire	Susan Estelle Jansen, Neal Israel	Disney Channel	United States
2003 (8th)	Arthur	Lesley Taylor, Pierre Valette, Greg Bailey	PBS Kids	United States
2003 (8th)	Don't Blame the Koalas	Noel Price, Dennis Kiely	Nine Network	Australia
2003 (8th)	8 Simple Rules... for Dating My Teenage Daughter		ABC	United States
2003 (8th)	That's So Raven	Marc Warren, Dennis Rinsler, Sean McNamara	Disney Channel	United States
2004 (9th)	8 Simple Rules... for Dating My Teenage Daughter		ABC	United States
2004 (9th)	All Grown Up!		Nickelodeon	United States
2004 (9th)	Watch My Chops		France 3	France
2004 (9th)	Xcalibur	Marie-Pierre Moulinjeune, Robert Rea	YTV, France 2	Canada, France
2005 (10th)	Jakers! The Adventures of Piggley Winks		RTÉ2, PBS Kids, CBBC	Ireland, United States, United Kingdom
2005 (10th)	Atomic Betty		Teletoon, M6	Canada, France
2005 (10th)	Strange Days at Blake Holsey High		Global TV	Canada
2005 (10th)	Miss Spider's Sunny Patch Friends	Neil Affleck, Donnie Anderson, Pam Lehn	Teletoon	Canada
2006 (11th)	LazyTown	Magnús Scheving, Raymond P. Le Gué, Jonathan Judge	RÚV	Iceland
2006 (11th)	The Fairly OddParents	Butch Hartman, Gary Conrad	Nickelodeon	United States
2006 (11th)	SpongeBob SquarePants	Paul Tibbitt, Steve Hillenburg	Nickelodeon	United States
2006 (11th)	Harry and His Bucket Full of Dinosaurs	Kristine Klohk, Helen Cohen, Graham Ralph	Teletoon	Canada, United Kingdom
2007 (12th)	SpongeBob SquarePants	Stephen Hillenburg, Alan Smart	Nickelodeon	United States
2007 (12th)	LazyTown	Magnús Scheving, Raymond P. Le Gué, Jonathan Judge	RÚV	Iceland
2007 (12th)	Yin Yang Yo!	Bob Boyle, Steve Marmel	Jetix	United States, Canada
2007 (12th)	Lockie Leonard	Kylie Du Fresne, Peter Templeman	Nine Network	Australia
2008 (13th)	Yo Gabba Gabba!		Nickelodeon	United States, Canada
2008 (13th)	Phineas and Ferb	Dan Povenmire, Jeff "Swampy" Marsh	Disney Channel	United States
2008 (13th)	iCarly	Joe Catania, Roger Christiansen, Dan Schneider	Nickelodeon	United States
2008 (13th)	LazyTown	Magnús Scheving, Raymond P. Le Gué	RÚV	Iceland
2009 (14th)	The Penguins of Madagascar	Bob Schooley, Mark McCorkle, Bret Haaland	Nickelodeon	United States
2009 (14th)	Ben 10: Alien Force	Glen Murakami, Donna Smith, Dan Riba	Cartoon Network	United States
2009 (14th)	Dora the Explorer	Miken Wong, Allan Jacobsen	Nickelodeon	United States
2009 (14th)	Phineas and Ferb	Dan Povenmire, Jeff "Swampy" Marsh	Disney Channel	United States

=== 2010s ===
Year	Program	Recipient(s)	Network	Country
2010 (15th)	The Penguins of Madagascar		Nickelodeon	United States
2010 (15th)	Dirtgirlworld	Cate McQuillen, Janice Walker	ABC Kids, CBC	Australia, Canada
2010 (15th)	Phineas and Ferb	Dan Povenmire, Jeff "Swampy" Marsh	Disney Channel	United States
2010 (15th)	SpongeBob SquarePants		Nickelodeon	United States
2011 (16th)	Fish Hooks	Maxwell Atoms, Noah Z. Jones	Disney Channel	United States
2011 (16th)	Adventure Time	Kelly Crews, Larry Leichliter, Pendleton Ward	Cartoon Network	United States
2011 (16th)	Regular Show	Janet Dimon, J. G. Quintel, Mike Roth	Cartoon Network	United States
2011 (16th)	Phineas and Ferb	Dan Povenmire, Jeff "Swampy" Marsh	Disney Channel	United States
2012 (17th)	SpongeBob SquarePants	Paul Tibbitt, Casey Alexander, Zeus Cervas	Nickelodeon	United States
2012 (17th)	Phineas and Ferb	Dan Povenmire, Jeff "Swampy" Marsh	Disney Channel	United States
2012 (17th)	iCarly	Joe Catania, Roger Christiansen, Dan Schneider	Nickelodeon	United States
2012 (17th)	Kung Fu Panda: Legends of Awesomeness	Peter Hastings, Gabe Swarr, Randy Doormans	Nickelodeon	United States
2013 (18th)	Adventure Time	Pendleton Ward, Larry Leichliter, Kelly Crews	Cartoon Network	United States
2013 (18th)	Doc McStuffins		Disney Junior	United States
2013 (18th)	Kung Fu Panda: Legends of Awesomeness		Nickelodeon	United States
2013 (18th)	Regular Show		Cartoon Network	United States
2014 (19th)	Adventure Time	Pendleton Ward, Graham Falk, Nick Jennings	Cartoon Network	United States
2014 (19th)	Doc McStuffins	Norton Virgien, Theresa Mayer, Chris Nee	Disney Junior	United States
2014 (19th)	SpongeBob SquarePants	Marc Ceccarelli, Luke Brookshier, Vincent Waller	Nickelodeon	United States
2014 (19th)	Teenage Mutant Ninja Turtles	Alan Wan, Brandon Auman, Ciro Nieli	Nickelodeon	United States
2015 (20th)	Gravity Falls		Disney XD	United States
2015 (20th)	Nowhere Boys	Beth Frey, Tony Ayres, Daina Reid	ABC Me	Australia
2015 (20th)	Adventure Time		Cartoon Network	United States
2015 (20th)	Clarence		Cartoon Network	United States
2016 (21st)	We Bare Bears	Daniel Chong, Manny Hernandez, Carrie Wilksen	Cartoon Network	United States
2016 (21st)	Nowhere Boys	Beth Frey, Tony Ayres, Peter Salmon	ABC Me	Australia
2016 (21st)	SpongeBob SquarePants		Nickelodeon	United States
2016 (21st)	Peter Rabbit		CBeebies	Ireland, United Kingdom
2017 (22nd)	SpongeBob SquarePants	Stephen Hillenburg, Vincent Waller, Marc Ceccarelli	Nickelodeon	United States
2017 (22nd)	An American Girl Story – Melody 1963: Love Has to Win	Alison McDonald, Tina Mabry, Nicole Dow	Prime Video	United States
2017 (22nd)	The Snowy Day		Prime Video	United States
2017 (22nd)	Ask the StoryBots	Evan Spiridellis, Gregg Spiridellis	Netflix	United States
2018 (23rd)	SpongeBob SquarePants	Stephen Hillenburg, Vincent Waller, Marc Ceccarelli	Nickelodeon	United States
2018 (23rd)	The Deep	Tom Taylor, Trent Carlson, Steven Wendland	WildBrainTV, 7TWO	Canada, Australia
2018 (23rd)	The Heroic Quest of the Valiant Prince Ivandoe	Christian Bøving-Andersen, Eva Lee Wallberg, Daniel Lennard	Cartoon Network	Denmark
2018 (23rd)	Trollhunters: Tales of Arcadia	Rodrigo Blaas, Marc Guggenheim, Chad Hammes	Netflix	United States
2018 (23rd)	Nowhere Boys: Two Moons Rising	Beth Frey, Tony Ayres, Rowan Woods	ABC Me	Australia
2018 (23rd)	Andi Mack	Terri Minsky, Michelle Manning, Greg Hampson	Disney Channel	United States
2018 (23rd)	Hunter Street	Melle Runderkamp, Rogier Visser, Frank Jan Horst	Nickelodeon	Netherlands
2018 (23rd)	The Next Step		Family Channel	Canada
2018 (23rd)	Tumble Leaf	Kelli Bixler, Drew Hodges	Prime Video	United States
2018 (23rd)	Doc McStuffins		Disney Junior	United States
2018 (23rd)	Vampirina	Chris Nee, Norton Virgien, Nicky Phelan	Disney Junior	United States
2018 (23rd)	The Stinky & Dirty Show		Prime Video	United States, Ireland
2019 (24th)	Teen Titans Go!		Cartoon Network	United States
2019 (24th)	Doc McStuffins	Dan Nosella, Michael Stern, Chris Nee	Disney Junior	United States
2019 (24th)	SpongeBob SquarePants	Stephen Hillenburg, Vincent Waller, Marc Ceccarelli	Nickelodeon	United States
2019 (24th)	Apple & Onion	George Gendi, Brent Tanner, Benton Connor	Cartoon Network	United States, United Kingdom
2019 (24th)	Odd Squad	Scott Montgomery, Warren P. Sonoda, Mark D'Angelis	PBS Kids, TVO	United States, Canada
2019 (24th)	Andi Mack	Terri Minsky, Michelle Manning, Greg Hampson	Disney Channel	United States
2019 (24th)	Malibu Rescue	Savage Steve Holland, Jed Elinoff, Scott McAboy	Netflix	United States

=== 2020s ===
Year	Program	Recipient(s)	Network	Country
2022 (25th)	Bluey	Joe Brumm, Charlie Aspinwall, Sam Moor	ABC Kids	Australia
2022 (25th)	City of Ghosts	Elizabeth Ito, Joanne Shen, Ako Castuera	Netflix	France, United States
2022 (25th)	Maya and the Three	Jorge Gutierrez, Tim Yoon, Jeff Ranjo	Netflix	Mexico, United States
2022 (25th)	Kiri and Lou	Fiona Copland, Heather Walker, Harry Sinclair	TVNZ, CBeebies	New Zealand

- Note: The series that don't have recipients on the tables had Production team credited as recipients for the award or nomination.

== Multiple wins ==
Wins	Program
4	SpongeBob SquarePants
2	The Penguins of Madagascar
1	Adventure Time

== Multiple nominations ==
Nominations	Program
9	SpongeBob SquarePants
5	Phineas and Ferb
4	Adventure Time
4	Doc McStuffins
3	LazyTown
3	Nowhere Boys
2	Angela Anaconda
2	Animated Tales of the World
2	8 Simple Rules... for Dating My Teenage Daughter
2	iCarly
2	The Penguins of Madagascar
2	Regular Show
2	Kung Fu Panda: Legends of Awesomeness
2	Andi Mack
