= Irene Chen =

Australian actress based in Melbourne

Irene Chen is an Australian actress based in Melbourne. At age seventeen, she starred in her first feature film, The Home Song Stories, alongside Joan Chen, Joel Lok, Qi Yu Wu, Steven Vidler and Kerry Walker.

== Career ==
From an early age, Chen's interest in acting blossomed through her participation in speech and drama classes, and various school productions. In 2006, she was cast as "May", the daughter of Rose (Joan Chen), in The Home Song Stories.

=== Nominations ===
- AFI Best Supporting Actress
- AFI Young Actor Award
- FCCA Best Supporting Actress
