= Sardelis =

Sardelis (Greek: Σαρδέλης or Σαρδελής), native feminine Sardeli (Σαρδέλη or Σαρδελή), is a Greek surname. Notable people with the name include:

- Giannis Sardelis (born 2000), Greek footballer
- Luca Sardelis (born 2001), Australian actress
