= Old School (TV series) =

- Genre: Crime; Drama; Comedy; Adventure
- Created by: Paul Oliver; Steve Wright
- Starring: Bryan Brown; Sam Neill
- Country of origin: Australia
- Original language: English
- No. of seasons: 1
- No. of episodes: 8

Production
- Executive producers: Tony Ayres; Penny Chapman; Christopher Gist; Gregor Jordan; Carole Sklan
- Production locations: Sydney, Australia
- Running time: 55 minutes
- Production company: Matchbox Pictures

Original release
- Network: ABC1
- Release: 23 May – 11 July 2014

Old School is an Australian television drama series that screened on ABC1 from 23 May to 11 July 2014. The eight-part series follows the adventures of retired criminal Lennie Cahill and retired cop Ted McCabe. The characters were originally depicted in the short film Lennie Cahill Shoots Through by Paul Oliver.

Old School was created by Paul Oliver and Steve Wright, and directed by Gregor Jordan, Peter Templeman and Paul Oliver. The producer was Helen Panckhurst, with executive producers Tony Ayres and Penny Chapman. Old School was written by Belinda Chayko, Paul Oliver, Matt Cameron, Chris Hawkshaw, Gregor Jordan, Michaeley O’Brien and Nick Parsons, with script producers Tim Pye and Sarah Smith.

The song accompanying the opening titles is "Disguise" by Eleanor Dunlop.

== Cast ==
=== Regulars ===
- Bryan Brown as Lennie Cahill
- Sam Neill as Ted McCabe
- Sarah Peirse as Margaret McCabe
- Hanna Mangan-Lawrence as Shannon Cahill
- Mark Coles Smith as Jason Dhurkay
- Malcolm Kennard as Kurt Meeks
- Harry Greenwood as Zac
- Kate Box as Cath Khoury
- Peter Phelps as Chinese Begger
- Damian Walshe-Howling as Vince Pelagatti
- Sacha Horler as Rhonda

=== Guests ===
- Aaron Jeffery as Rick (2 episodes)
- Ben Oxenbould as Mickey Rowe (1 episode)
- Ben Winspear as Rodger (1 episode)
- Danny Roberts as Andy Muir (1 episode)
- Darren Gilshenan as John Stoyanov (1 episode)
- Gary Waddell as Ken (1 episode)
- Simon Westaway as Dave Granger (1 episode)
- Steve Le Marquand as Gerard (2 episodes)

== Episodes ==
No.	Title	Directed by	Written by	Original release date	AUS viewers (millions)
1	"Yesterday's Heroes"	Gregor Jordan	Paul Oliver & Gregor Jordan	23 May 2014	862,000
The armoured van hold-up should have gone easily, but Detective Ted McCabe and his team knew about it. Lennie Cahill was arrested and a mysterious "bloke in a suit" shot McCabe.
2	"Smash Repairs"	Gregor Jordan	Belinda Chayko	30 May 2014	740,000
Ted and Lennie tail corrupt cop Rick Duncan, but Lennie smashes into the back of Rick's SUV. Rick threatens Lennie with a parole breach, and tells Ted he has to pay the cost of repairs.
3	"Easy Money"	Peter Templeman	Belinda Chayko	6 June 2014	664,000
On the trail of Rick Duncan's killer, Ted and Lennie find themselves in the thick of a greyhound-doping scam. A possible saviour of the McCabe's stolen finances comes from an unlikely place.
4	"Her Weight in Gold"	Peter Templeman	Michaeley O'Brien & Gregor Jordan	13 June 2014	672,000
When Ted and Lennie find books in crooked cop Rick's secret lock-up they have no idea of the trouble they are in. The books are laced with LSD, and the Triads and the Feds are after them.
5	"Tiny Dancer"	Paul Oliver	Matt Cameron	20 June 2014	614,000
Ted suspects Lennie of being involved in the robbery of a wealthy couple's home safe with a partner in crime who turns out to be Lennie's estranged wife.
6	"Sky the Towel"	Paul Oliver	Matt Cameron	27 June 2014	618,000
Ted and Lennie's visit to the illegal fights leads to the stabbing of Ted's former boxing protege, whose body they can't find. Meanwhile Ted's wife Margaret ends up in mortal danger.
7	"Dead Man Walking"	Gregor Jordan	Matt Cameron	4 July 2014	725,000
Margaret is kidnapped by "The Florist" from the Sterling Nickle heist, and Ted and Lennie have to try to save her before it's too late.
8	"All That Glitters"	Gregor Jordan	Belinda Chayko	11 July 2014	721,000
After the shooting of Kurt Meeks Ted is confined to home detention and Lennie is back in gaol, but then Ted learns that Lennie is going to rob the Duke Hotel's safe.
