= Formal Wars =

- Genre: Reality
- Presented by: Melanie Vallejo
- Country of origin: Australia
- Original language: English
- No. of seasons: 1
- No. of episodes: 8 (aired)

Production
- Running time: 60 minutes (with adverts)
- Production company: Matchbox Productions

Original release
- Network: Seven Network
- Release: 25 July – 12 September 2013

Formal Wars is an Australian reality television series produced by Matchbox Productions that premiered on the Seven Network on 25 July 2013. In each episode, two high school students hand over control of their school formal to their parents. The series is hosted by Melanie Vallejo.

== Format ==
The series sees high school students handing over control of their high school formal preparations to their parents. Each week, two high school students receive $2,000 towards the cost of their school formal but their parents are given control and must decide their date, their attire and their transport to the venue.

== Series One (2013) ==
The first series premiered on the Seven Network on 25 July 2013 at 8:30 pm.

Episode	Original airing	Synopsis	Australian viewing figures	Rank
1	25 July 2013	High school friends Shanique and Montana hand over control of their high school formal to their parents.	676,000	#13
2	1 August 2013	Stephanie and Victoria both prove hard to please as they hand over control of their high school formals; they start by asking for a hot pink hummer. Will their parents give in? Stephanie is a country girl with steely determination, Victoria is a self claimed fashionista who believes image is everything.		
