= Cut Snake =

2014 Australian film

- Film poster
- Directed by: Tony Ayres
- Written by: Blake Ayshford
- Produced by: Trevor Blainey; Michael McMahon
- Starring: Sullivan Stapleton
- Cinematography: Simon Chapman
- Edited by: Andy Canny
- Music by: Cornel Wilczek
- Production company: Matchbox Pictures
- Release date: 9 August 2014
- Running time: 94 minutes
- Country: Australia
- Language: English

Cut Snake is a 2014 Australian thriller film directed by Tony Ayres and written by Blake Ayshford. The title comes from the Australian idiom "mad as a cut snake" which describes either insanity or anger so extreme you don't want to get near it. The film was screened in the Contemporary World Cinema section at the 2014 Toronto International Film Festival.

== Plot ==
Twentysomething Paula (Jessica De Gouw) meets Merv (Alex Russell), her dream boyfriend out of nowhere. While not knowing anything about Merv's background, Paula approaches marriage with the mysterious Merv.

James (Sullivan Stapleton) comes “fresh out of prison in Sydney” and is looking forward to pick up where he left off with Merv. Soon after, Paula finds out that Merv spent four years in jail on manslaughter charges. Little did Paula know that the relationship between these two ex-cons is more than just a fellowship in Prison. The presence of James exposes Merv's criminal history, jeopardises his future with Paula, and brings many conflicts to Merv's emotions.

== Cast ==
- Sullivan Stapleton as James
- Alex Russell as Merv
- Jessica De Gouw as Paula
- Brett Swain as Boss
- Kerry Walker as Mrs Farrell
- Syd Brisbane as Ben

== Reception ==
Cut Snake was met with positive reviews from critics and audiences, earning a 69% approval rating based on 16 reviews on Rotten Tomatoes.

=== Accolades ===
Award	Category	Subject	Result
AWGIE Award	Best Writing in a Feature Film - Original	Blake Ayshford	Nominated
AACTA Awards (5th)	Best Original Screenplay	Blake Ayshford	Nominated
AACTA Awards (5th)	Best Actor	Sullivan Stapleton	Nominated
AACTA Awards (5th)	Best Editing	Andy Canny	Nominated
AACTA Awards (5th)	Best Production Design	Josephine Ford	Nominated
AACTA Awards (5th)	Best Costume Design	Cappi Ireland	Nominated
AFCA Award	Best Actor	Sullivan Stapleton	Nominated
Byron Bay Film Festival	Best Dramatic Feature	Tony Ayres	Won
FCCA Awards	Best Actor	Sullivan Stapleton	Nominated
FCCA Awards	Best Production Design	Josephine Ford	Nominated
FCCA Awards	Best Cinematography	Simon Chapman	Nominated
FCCA Awards	Best Script/Screenplay	Blake Ayshford	Nominated
FCCA Awards	Best Editor	Andy Canny	Nominated

== See also ==
- Cinema of Australia
