= Devil's Playground (TV series) =

- Genre: Drama; Psychological thriller
- Written by: Blake Ayshford; Alice Addison; Tommy Murphy; Cate Shortland
- Directed by: Rachel Ward; Tony Krawitz
- Starring: Simon Burke; John Noble; Don Hany; Jack Thompson; Toni Collette
- Country of origin: Australia
- Original language: English
- No. of seasons: 1
- No. of episodes: 6

Production
- Executive producers: Tony Ayres; Penny Win; Simon Burke
- Producers: Helen Bowden; Penny Chapman; Blake Ayshford
- Running time: 51 minutes
- Production company: Matchbox Pictures

Original release
- Network: Showcase
- Release: 9 September – 8 October 2014

Related
- The Devil's Playground

Devil's Playground is an Australian psychological thriller television series which premiered on Showcase on 9 September 2014. It was created as a sequel to the 1976 film, The Devil's Playground. The series begins in 1988 and follows the story of Tom Allen, a recently widowed psychiatrist and a secular counselor to the Catholic clergy, who becomes entangled in political and theological intrigue. Simon Burke reprised his role as Tom Allen.

== Development ==
On 26 November 2012, Matchbox Pictures announced that they would produce a drama series for Foxtel that would serve as a continuation to the 1976 film The Devil's Playground.

The series is produced by Helen Bowden, Penny Chapman and Blake Ayshford and directed by Rachel Ward and Tony Krawitz. It is written by Blake Ayshford, Cate Shortland, Alice Addison and Tommy Murphy and the Executive Producers are Tony Ayres, Penny Win and Simon Burke.

== Synopsis ==
The year is 1988. It is 35 years after the events of Fred Schepisi's classic film, The Devil's Playground. Tom Allen, now in his 40s and recently widowed, is a respected Sydney psychiatrist and father of two children. A practising Catholic, Tom accepts an offer by the Bishop of Sydney to become a counsellor of priests. During these sessions and other events, he uncovers a scandal that embroils him through a personal hell hole and the Church's various attempts to cover it up. Tom's quest for justice pushes him to his limits, but it reveals a dark-side of the Church's power and the extent of official corruption, which he could never have envisaged.

== Cast ==
=== Main cast ===
- Simon Burke as Tom Allen, psychiatrist, reprising his role from the 1979 film
- Don Hany as Bishop Vincent Quaid
- John Noble as Bishop John McNally
- Andrew McFarlane as Father Marco Andrassi
- Anna Lise Phillips as Alice Kelly, Tom's neighbour and lover
- Jarin Towney as Elliot Darcy, student
- Morgana Davies as Bridie Allen, Tom's daughter
- Toni Collette as NSW MP Margaret Wallace
- Jack Thompson as Cardinal Constantine Neville

=== Recurring cast ===
- James Fraser as David Allen, Tom's gay son
- Matt Levett as Brendan Mahony, street prostitute with a secret
- Ben Hall as Finton Kelly, Alice's son
- Leon Ford as Brother Paul Warner, Elliot's teacher
- Uli Latukefu as Father Matteo, Quaid's assistant
- Jessica Donoghue as Catherine Darcy, Elliot's mother
- Jason Klarwein as Matthew Darcy, Elliot's father
- Malcolm Kennard as Joe Kelly, Alice's husband
- Max Cullen as Father Joyce, elderly member of the clergy
- Joe Petruzzi as Bishop Mafucci
- Darren Gilshenan as Father Lenken

== Episodes ==
No.	Title	Directed by	Written by	Original release date	US viewers (millions)
1	"I Will Bring Fire Onto This Earth"	Rachel Ward	Blake Ayshford	9 September 2014	48,000
In 1988, devout Catholic psychiatrist and former trainee priest Tom Allen is still recovering from the death of his wife and an ill-fated love affair with Alice, a neighbour in a troubled relationship. When a boy at a local Catholic school goes missing, questions are asked. Two popular Catholic clergy — Father Andrassi and Brother Warner — launch a desperate search to find the missing boy in time. However, the church is also facing its own internal moral concerns and anxieties about priestly conduct, and Tom is called in to counsel a number of the priests. As Cardinal Neville prepares to retire, his time in the position is celebrated by local Catholic state MP Margaret Wallace, but a power struggle has also begun for the top job in the Sydney Catholic Archdiocese.
2	"The Tail of the Serpent"	Rachel Ward	Blake Ayshford	9 September 2014	48,000
The missing boy's body is found, and a cryptic note suggests the death is not accidental. Father Andrassi becomes a new client of Tom's and a meeting between Bishop Quaid and Brendan Mahony causes Quaid to question the secrets that are being concealed within his institution.
3	"He Maketh My Way Perfect"	Rachel Ward	Alice Addison	16 September 2014	N/A
Bishop Quaid decides to delve into the allegations made by Brendan. Elliot becomes the target of new unwanted attention. Brendan infiltrates Tom's world when he meets his son, David.
4	"The Forgiveness of Sins"	Tony Krawitz	Tommy Murphy	23 September 2014	TBA
Tom takes his concerns about the ongoing case to Bishop McNallly but later finds that his house has been broken into. Meanwhile, another boy goes missing.
5	"The Whirlwind and the Storm"	Tony Krawitz	Cate Shortland	30 September 2014	N/A
In the wake of the investigation, Tom discovers his own past is also under public scrutiny and his life is being threatened from unknown quarters. Bishop Quaid reveals the results of his own investigation to Margaret, and Alice learns the truth.
6	"Matthew 18:6"	Tony Krawitz	Blake Ayshford & Tommy Murphy	8 October 2014	N/A
Tom confronts Bishop McNally and threatens to leak the results of his investigation beyond the confines of the institutional church. Margaret, Tom and Quaid attempt to end the Church's corruption and internal concealment of it, but they could risk their personal relationships and professional careers as they do so.

== Awards and nominations ==
Year	Award	Category	Nominee	Result	Ref
2015	Logie Awards	Most Outstanding Actor	John Noble	Nominated	
2015	Logie Awards	Most Outstanding Miniseries or Telemovie	Devil's Playground	Won	
