= Deadlock (TV series) =

Australian television miniseries

- Genre: Drama
- Created by: Deb Cox
- Written by: Billie Pleffer
- Directed by: Billie Pleffer
- Starring: Luca Asta Sardelis; Bijou Gracie Henry
- Composer: Michael Yezerski
- Country of origin: Australia
- Original language: English
- No. of series: 1
- No. of episodes: 5

Production
- Executive producers: Deb Cox; Fiona Eagger; Que Minh Luu; Lois Randall
- Producer: Belinda Mravicic
- Cinematography: James L. Brown
- Running time: 12 minutes

Original release
- Network: ABC iview
- Release: 20 July 2018

Deadlock is an Australian television series created by Deb Cox. It is loosely based on a real event in 2006 where four teenagers died in a car crash. It consists of five episode each telling a story from the point of view of a different character. It was made available on ABC iView on 20 July 2018. The Sydney Morning Herald's Brad Newsome wrote "the five snack-sized episodes are an evocative snapshot of modern teen life." Also in the Sydney Morning Herald Bridget McManus gave it 4 stars calling it a "atmospheric coming-of-age series" Who's capsual review gave it 3 stars saying "It's a narrative as erratic as the wild party at the heart of the tale."

== Cast ==
- Luca Asta Sardelis as Sadie
- Bijou Gracie Henry as Laila
- Thomas Weatherall as Aero
- Amit Pala as Zai
- Michael Philippou as Jed Manos
- Danny Philippou as Ned Manos

== Awards ==
- 8th AACTA Awards
  - Best Online Series - Fiona Eagger, Deb Cox, Belinda Mravicic, Billie Pleffer - won
