= While the Men Are Away =

Australian television series

- Genre: Drama
- Created by: Alexandra Burke; Kim Wilson; Monica Zanett
- Written by
- Directed by: Elissa Down; Monica Zanetti
- Starring: Michela De Rossi; Max McKenna; Phoebe Grainer; Matt Testro; Jana Zvedeniuk; Shaka Cook; Benedict Hardie
- Country of origin: Australia
- Original language: English
- No. of series: 1
- No. of episodes: 8

Production
- Executive producer
- Producer: Lisa Shaunessy
- Running time: 26-29 minutes

Original release
- Network: SBS
- Release: 27 September – 18 October 2023

While the Men are Away is an Australian television drama series broadcast on SBS and follows Francesca (Michela De Rossi) who is left in charge of an apple farm after her husband enlists in World War 2. Francesca recruits local women and "certified coward" Robert (Matt Testro) to help her. The series explores patriarchy, racism and homophobia.

Julie Eckersley, Head of Scripted, said, "While the Men Are Away is an absolutely delightful revisionist history with a twist of truth. It is warm hearted and clever and full of characters you will fall in love with."

The series was promoted as an "often (but not always) wildly historically inaccurate" dramedy about the Australian Women's Land Army during World War II and premiered on 27 September 2023 with double episodes.

== Production ==
The series was announced in December 2022 as an Arcadia production with major production investment from Screen Australia and finance with support from Screen NSW. It was filmed in Orange and Central West of New South Wales.

Filming took place commenced in January 2023. The trailer was released on 22 August 2023.

== Cast ==
- Michela De Rossi as Francesca (Frankie)
- Max McKenna as Gwen
- Phoebe Grainer as Kathleen
- Matt Testro as Robert
- Jana Zvedeniuk as Esther
- Shaka Cook as Murray
- Benedict Hardie as Des
- Mercia Deane-Johns as Mrs Whitmore
- Ella Scott Lynch as Rita
- Rebecca Massey as Brigadier Birdwood

== Episodes ==
Episode	Title
1	Get Behind the Girl He Left Behind!
2	Furrowing the Fuhrer's Brow!
3	God Spee the Plough and the Women Who Drives It!
4	She Talked! This Happened!
5	Come and Join the Victory Harvest
6	Catch Him with His Panzers Down
7	We've Always Despised Them, Now We Must Smash Them
8	We Took the Hill, Come Help Us Keep It!

== Reception ==
Clare Rigen from The West Australian said "While so much of television about this era chooses to focus on our involvement in World War II, SBS' new eight-part dramedy instead takes a look at the stories of those left to hold down the fort at home — and it's great fun" Rigen said "[it] is about people who don't normally hold the reins of power suddenly having them shoved in their hands and told to giddy the hell up". Rigen concluded saying "This is a silly, funny and surprisingly poignant series about a fascinating time in Australian history."

Wenlei Ma from The Guardian gave the series 3 out of 5 stars saying, "The first two episodes are a little wobbly as it tries to settle on a tone that is farcical without being slight. But once the series hits its stride, the jaunty story maintains a springy pacing. And, without realising it, you become invested in the characters. They're more than just archetypes, even though their individual journeys chart familiar emotional challenges."

Mel Campbell from Screenhub gave the series 3½ out of 5 stars saying, "I found an earnest period drama that champions today's progressive values – economic independence, sexual freedom, and allyship across race, ethnicity, religion and sexual orientation – in opposition to a straight, white, bourgeois, Christian monoculture."

Suzy Wrong from Joy 94.9 said, "The series is beautifully shot featuring gorgeous costumes and scenery. The story is well conceived, it is clear that very smart and modern brains are behind its creation, but I never really connected with any of the characters." Wong persisted with and said it offered a "rewarding experience".
