= Kerry Walker =

Australian actress

- Born: Kerry Ann Walker; 29 February 1948 (age 78); Sydney, New South Wales, Australia
- Education: National Institute of Dramatic Art (1974)
- Occupation: Actor
- Years active: 1977–present

Kerry Ann Walker AM (born 29 February 1948) is an Australian actress. She has had a lengthy career on both stage and screen. She was nominated for the AFI Award for Best Actress in a Supporting Role three times, in 1985 for Bliss, 1986 for Twelfth Night and in 1993 for The Piano.

== Early life ==
Walker began studied acting at the National Institute of Dramatic Art (NIDA), in 1972, and graduated in 1974. Upon graduation, she was told she "would not succeed as an actor because of her looks."

== Career ==
=== Theatre ===
Walker made her professional theatre debut in a production of Romeo and Juliet with The Australian Ballet. After a stint with the Melbourne Theatre Company’s Theatre-in-Education program, she spent 1976 with the newly-formed Hunter Valley Theatre Company. She ultimately returned to Sydney, continuing her stage career with performances at Marian Street Theatre, Jane Street Theatre, the Old Tote Theatre Company and Nimrod.

After being cast in the lead of 1977 film The Night the Prowler in 1977, Walker became the muse of writer Patrick White, (Australia's only recipient of the Nobel Prize in Literature), She was in the original cast of three of his plays, Signal Driver (1982), Netherwood (1983), and Shepherd on the Rocks (1987), which he wrote specifically for her. The first two plays debuted with the State Theatre Company of South Australia, where Walker was a member of Jim Sharman’s Lighthouse ensemble from 1982 to 1983. White also cast her in major revivals of The Ham Funeral and A Cheery Soul and wrote an unperformed play sequence for her, entitled Four Love Songs.

More recently, Walker has performed in Life Without Me (2010) The Man from Mukinupin (2009), The Hypocrite (2008), The Madwoman of Chaillot (2007), A Hard God (2006) and The Unexpected Man (2000).

She has served on the boards of Belvoir Street Theatre / Company B.

=== Film and television ===
Walker's film credits include 1985 arthouse classic Bliss, Jane Campion’s award-winning 1993 period drama The Piano, opposite Holly Hunter and Harvey Keitel, and 1996 comedy drama Cosi (based on Louis Nowra’s play of the same name), alongside Ben Mendelsohn, Toni Collette and Rachel Griffiths. At the turn of the century, she appeared in the historical comedy drama The Dish with Sam Neill, and coming-of-age film Looking for Alibrandi with Anthony LaPaglia and Pia Miranda. Next came Baz Luhrmann's 2001 musical spectacle Moulin Rouge! (2001), opposite Nicole Kidman and Ewan McGregor, followed by The Home Song Stories (2007) and Luhrmann epic Australia (2008), alongside Kidman and Hugh Jackman.

Walker's numerous television credits include the 1990 miniseries Come in Spinner (based on the 1951 novel of the same name by Dymphna Cusack), and the 1991 Australian-British co-produced miniseries The Leaving of Liverpool. She had a regular role in Grass Roots in 2003 and also appeared in Rake (2008) with Richard Roxburgh.

== Depictions in art ==
Stuart Campbell's photographic portrait of Walker is held in the National Portrait Gallery.

== Awards and accolades ==
Walker has been the recipient of numerous awards and nominations. These include Green Room Awards for Best Actress for Pack of Lies and Knuckledusters: The Jewels of Edith Sitwell (the latter of which she both wrote and performed) and several AFI Awards. She was also granted an Australian Artists Creative Fellowship.

Walker was made a Member of the Order of Australia (AM) in 1994 for her "service to the performing arts".

=== Awards, nominations and honours ===
| Year | Work | Award | Category | Result |
|---|---|---|---|---|
| 1985 | Bliss | AFI Awards | Best Actress in a Supporting Role | Nominated |
| 1986 | Twelfth Night | AFI Awards | Best Actress in a Supporting Role | Nominated |
| | Pack of Lies | Green Room Awards | Best Actress | Won |
| 1989 | Knuckledusters: The Jewels of Edith Sitwell | Green Room Awards | Best Actress | Won |
| 1993 | The Piano | AFI Awards | Best Actress in a Supporting Role | Nominated |
| 1994 | Kerry Walker | Member of the Order of Australia | Service to the Performing Arts | Honoured |
| 2012 | Killing Time | Equity Ensemble Awards | Outstanding Performance by an Ensemble in a Miniseries or Telemovie | Nominated |

== Filmography ==
=== Film ===
| Year | Title | Role | Notes |
|---|---|---|---|
| 1977 | The Singer and the Dancer | Rose Buckley | |
| 1978 | The Night the Prowler | Felicity Bannister | |
| 1983 | Double Deal | Sibyl Anderson | |
| 1985 | Bliss | Alice Dalton | |
| 1986 | Twelfth Night | Feste | |
| 1987 | Bullseye | Mrs Gootch | |
| 1990 | Wendy Cracked a Walnut (aka Almost) | Deirdre | |
| 1992 | The Girl Who Came Late (aka Daydream Believer) | Aunt Vera | |
| 1993 | The Piano | Aunt Morag | |
| 1994 | Talk | Voice of the Witnesses | |
| 1995 | Babe | Sheep (voice) | |
| 1996 | Cosi | Sandra Russell | |
| 1997 | Road to Nhill | Alison | |
| 1998 | A Little Bit of Soul | Eugenie Mason | |
| 1999 | Holy Smoke! | Puss | |
| 2000 | Looking for Alibrandi | Sister Louise (Nun) | |
| 2000 | The Dish | Pearl | |
| 2001 | Moulin Rouge! | Marie | |
| 2002 | Sway | Greta | |
| 2003 | Peter Pan | Miss Fulsom | |
| 2006 | Solo | University Supervisor | |
| 2007 | Lens Love Story | Susan | Short film |
| 2007 | The Home Song Stories | Norma | |
| 2008 | Australia | Myrtle Allsop | |
| 2011 | A Heartbeat Away | Dawn | |
| 2014 | Cut Snake | Mrs Farrell | |
| 2015 | Holding the Man | Librarian in lift | |

=== Television ===
| Year | Title | Role | Notes |
|---|---|---|---|
| 1986 | Studio 86 | | 1 episode |
| 1987 | Poor Man's Orange | Miss Moon | Miniseries, 2 episodes |
| 1987 | Vietnam | Dinner guest | Miniseries, 1 episode |
| 1988 | Australians | Mrs Darcy | Miniseries, 1 episode |
| 1990 | Come in Spinner | Mrs Molesworth | Miniseries, 4 episodes |
| 1990 | Winners | Mrs Marsland | 1 episode |
| 1990 | The Ham Funeral | Alma Lusty | TV movie |
| 1991 | The Last Crop | Ann Sweeney | TV movie |
| 1991; 1992; 1996 | G.P. | Lorraine Ferguson / Joan Brodie | 3 episodes |
| 1993 | Under the Skin | | 1 episode |
| 1993 | The Leaving of Liverpool | Mrs Dunne | TV movie |
| 1994 | Heartland | Sylvia | 2 episodes |
| 1996 | After the Beep | Mary Donnelly | 7 episodes |

== Theatre ==
| Year | Title | Role | Notes | Ref. |
|---|---|---|---|---|
| 1974 | Fings Ain't Wot They Used T'Be | | NIDA | |
| 1974 | The Merchant of Venice | | NIDA | |
| 1974 | The Miser | | NIDA | |
| 1975 | Theatre-in-Education (collection of three plays) | Member of ensemble | MTC | |
| 1975 | What Means These Bones? | Various characters | Australian Theatre | |
| 1976 | A Happy and Holy Occasion | Brenda Mulcahy | Hunter Valley Theatre Company | |
| 1976 | Four on the Floor | Cabaret | Hunter Valley Theatre Company | |
| 1976 | Bedfellows | Carol Cummins | Hunter Valley Theatre Company | |
| 1976 | Hamlet on Ice | Hamlet | Hunter Valley Theatre Company | |
| 1976 | Equus | Hesther Salomon | Hunter Valley Theatre Company | |
| 1976 | The Floating World | Irene Harding | Hunter Valley Theatre Company | |
| 1976 | The Glass Menagerie | Laura Wingfield | Hunter Valley Theatre Company | |
| 1977 | The Alchemist | Dame Pliant | NIDA Parade Theatre, Sydney with Old Tote Theatre Company | |
| 1977 | Confusions | Various characters | Marian St Theatre, Sydney | |
| 1978 | As You Like It | Audrey / Le Beau | Jane St Theatre, Sydney | |
| 1978 | Mother Courage and Her Children | Mother Courage | Jane St Theatre, Sydney | |
| 1978 | Gone with Hardy | Nellie | Nimrod St Theatre, Sydney | |
| 1978–1979 | Romeo and Juliet | The Nurse | Nimrod St Theatre, Sydney, University of Western Australia | |
| 1978–1979 | On Our Selection | Mother Rudd / Mrs White | Australian National Playwrights Conference, Nimrod St Theatre, Sydney with NIDA / Jane St Theatre | |
| 1979 | Upside Down at the Bottom of the World | Freida Lawrence | Nimrod St Theatre, Sydney | |
| 1979 | Britannicus | Agrippina | Seymour Centre, Sydney | |
| 1979 | Beauty and the Beast | Felicity | STC | |
| 1980 | Measure for Measure | Isabella | A Shakespeare Company | |
| 1980 | The Two Gentlemen of Verona | Speed | A Shakespeare Company | |
| 1980 | The House of the Deaf Man | | Nimrod St Theatre, Sydney | |
| 1981 | Pinball | Miriam / Vandaloupe | Nimrod St Theatre, Sydney | |
| 1981 | The Eyes of the Whites | Moira | Nimrod St Theatre, Sydney | |
| 1981 | Lulu | Countess Geshwitz | STC / STCSA | |
| 1982 | The Prince of Homburg | The Electress of Homburg | STCSA | |
| 1982 | Spellbound | Margaret Mitchell | STCSA | |
| 1982 | Royal Show | Member of ensemble | STCSA | |
| 1982 | Mother Courage and Her Children | Mother Courage | STCSA | |
| 1982 | Silver Lining | Olga | STCSA | |
| 1982 | Signal Driver | Ivy Vokes / Second being | Playhouse, Adelaide with STCSA/ Belvoir St Theatre, Sydney | |
| 1982 | A Midsummer Night's Dream | Tom Snout / Moth | STCSA | |
| 1983 | The Blind Giant is Dancing | Eileen Fitzgerald | Playhouse, Adelaide with STCSA / Belvoir St Theatre, Sydney | |
| 1983 | Pal Joey | Gladys Bumps | STCSA | |
| 1983 | The Marriage of Figaro | Marcelline | STCSA | l |
| 1983 | Blood Wedding | Mother-in-law | STCSA | |
| 1983 | Sunrise | Peg Sheldon | STCSA | |
| 1983; 1984 | Twelfth Night | Feste | STCSA & Sydney Festival | |
| 1983; 1984 | Netherwood | Mog Figg | STCSA & Sydney Festival | |
| 1984 | Pack of Lies | Barbara | Russell St Theatre, Melbourne with MTC | |
| 1984 | The Threepenny Opera | Pirate Jenny | Playhouse Theatre, Melbourne with MTC | |
| 1984 | Henry and Peter and Henry and Me | Louisa Lawson | Australian National Playwrights Conference & American International Playwright's Conference, Connecticut | |
| 1985 | Signal Driver | Ivy Vokes | Belvoir St Theatre, Sydney with Company B | |
| 1985 | Visions | Madame Lynch | MTC | |
| 1985 | Your Tribe and My Tribe | Narrator | Sydney Opera House | |
| 1985 | A Midsummer Night's Dream | Titania / Hippolyta | MTC / STCSA | |
| 1987 | The Country Wife | Lady Fidget | Sydney Opera House with STC | |
| 1987 | Shepherd on the Rocks | Queenie | STCSA for Adelaide Festival | |
| 1987 | The Popular Mechanicals | Tom Snout | Belvoir St Theatre, Sydney with Company B | |
| 1988 | My Sister in This House | Madame | Seymour Centre, Sydney with Wilson Morley | l |
| 1988 | Serious Money | Marylou Baines / Mrs Etherington / Dolcie Starr | Russell St Theatre, Melbourne with MTC, Wharf Theatre, Sydney with STC | |
| 1989 | The Ham Funeral | Alma Lusty | Wharf Theatre, Sydney with STC | |
| 1989 | Knuckledusters: The Jewels of Edith Sitwell | Edith Sitwell | Belvoir St Theatre, Sydney with Company B with Sydney Festival, Russell St Theatre, Melbourne with MTC | |
| 1990 | Rome Tremble—Crumbs from a Feast of Callas | Evangelica Callas / Elsa Maxwell / Tina Onassis / Annina | Wharf Theatre, Sydney with STC | |
| 1990 | The Development Site | Various characters | STC | |
| 1991 | Furious | Alison / Bonny / Kathleen / Delegate | Wharf Theatre, Sydney with STC | |
| 1991 | The Government Inspector | Anna Andreyevna | Sydney Opera House with STC | |
| 1991 | The Royal Commission into the Australian Economy | Clerk of the court | Belvoir St Theatre, Sydney with Company B | |
| 1992 | The Girl Who Saw Everything | Liz | Wharf Theatre, Sydney with STC | |
| 1992 | The Popular Mechanicals | Tom Snout / Duchess of Shafton | Belvoir St Theatre, Sydney with Company B | |
| 1993 | Top Girls | Isabella Bird / Joyce / Mrs. Kidd | Wharf Theatre, Sydney with STC | |
| 1993 | The Visit | Professor | Sydney Opera House with STC | |
| 1994 | Furious | Alison / Bonny / Kathleen / Delegate | STC, The Space, Adelaide for Adelaide Festival, Playbox Theatre, Melbourne | |
| 1995 | The Blind Giant Is Dancing | Eileen Fitzgerald | Belvoir St Theatre, Sydney with Company B | |
| 1996 | Wasp | The Cowboy / Mom / The Magician's Assistant | Belvoir St Theatre, Sydney with Company B | |
| 1996 | Riders in the Chariot | Mrs. Jolley | Belvoir St Theatre, Sydney with Company B | |
| 1997 | Jerusalem | Vivien Rickman | Merlyn Theatre, Melbourne, Wharf Theatre, Sydney with STC | |
| 1997 | The Tempest | Gonzalo | Canberra Theatre, Her Majesty's Theatre, Adelaide, Sydney Opera House, Melbourne Atheneum with Bell Shakespeare | |
| 1998 | The Mirage | | STC | |
| 1999 | The Talented Mr Ripley | Emily Greenleaf / Aunt Dottie | Playhouse, Melbourne with MTC | |
| 1999 | Thunder Rock | Miss Kirby | STC | |
| 1999 | Pride and Prejudice | Mrs. Bennet | Playhouse, Melbourne with MTC, Sydney Opera House with STC | |
| 2000 | Blithe Spirit | Madame Arcati | Playhouse, Adelaide with STCSA | |
| 2000 | The Unexpected Man | Marthe | Belvoir St Theatre, Sydney with Company B, Victorian Arts Centre with MTC for Melbourne International Arts Festival | |
| 2000–2001 | A Cheery Soul | Mrs. Hibble / Mrs. Bleeker | Sydney Opera House with STC, Australian National Playwrights Conference | |
| 2001 | Holy Day | Nora | Merlyn Theatre, Melbourne, STCSA | |
| 2003 | A Derelict Woman | Derelict Woman | The Studio / New Music Network | |
| 2004; 2005 | The Spook | Trixie / Phyllis | Belvoir St Theatre, Sydney with Company B, Glen St Theatre, Sydney, QTC | |
| 2006 | StickybrickS | Member of ensemble | Sydney Festival with Big hART | |
| 2006 | A Hard God | Monica Cassidy / Sophia Cassidy | Wharf Theatre, Sydney with STC | |
| 2006 | Radio Holiday | | Melbourne International Arts Festival / Big hART | |
| 2007 | Drive In Holiday | Betty / Crystal / Musician | Ten Days on the Island, Tasmania / Big hART | |
| 2007 | The Madwoman of Chaillot | Josephine | Playhouse, Melbourne with MYC | |
| 2008 | The Wiredancer's Waltz | Inga Heffernan | National Play Festival, Brisbane | |
| 2008 | Australian Gothic | Sonya August | National Play Festival | |
| 2008 | The Hypocrite | | | |
| 2009 | The Man from Mukinupin | Edie Perkins | Belvoir St Theatre, Sydney / MTC | |
| 2010 | Life Without Me | | | |
