= Lou (2010 film) =

- Film poster
- Directed by: Belinda Chayko
- Written by: Belinda Chayko
- Produced by: Tony Ayres; Helen Bowden; Belinda Chayko; Michael McMahon
- Starring: John Hurt; Emily Barclay; Lily Bell Tindley
- Cinematography: Hugh Miller
- Edited by: Denise Haratzis
- Music by: Glenn Richards
- Production companies: Big & Little Films
- Distributed by: Kojo Pictures
- Release date: 17 June 2010
- Country: Australia
- Language: English
- Box office: A$59,505 (Australia)

Lou is a 2010 Australian drama film starring John Hurt, Emily Barclay, and Lily Bell Tindley.

== Plot ==
Young mother Rhea (Barclay) without a partner, tries to raise her three girls in their ramshackle home while trying to survive on social security. Set in sugarcane country in northern NSW, their lives are upended when Doyle (Hurt); a former merchant seaman—now in the early stages of Alzheimer's, is thrust upon them with the promise of increased benefits.

== Cast ==
- John Hurt as Doyle
- Emily Barclay as Rhea
- Lily Bell Tindley as Lou
- Jay Ryan as Cosmo
- Damien Garvey as Colin
- Daniela Farinacci as Mrs Marchetti
- Jonathan Segat as Blake
- Logan Reilly as Jock
- Charlie-Rose MacLennan as Leanne
- Eloise MacLennan as Lani

== Production ==
The film was inspired by the writer-director's uncle who had Alzheimer's.

John Hurt said he agreed to make the film because "this is a very nice story indeed, it's beautifully written".

The film was shot in north-eastern New South Wales. Shooting started in May 2009.
