= Belinda Chayko =

Australian film director

Belinda Chayko is an Australian film director and screenwriter.

== Biography ==
Belinda Chayko started her working career as a cadet journalist with The Sydney Morning Herald After several years she started leaning towards screenwriting and attended the Australian Film Television and Radio School, obtaining the B.A. degree in screenwriting in 1989.

== Filmography ==
- 2010: Lou
- 2000: City Loop

=== TV series ===
- Secret City
- Fires
- The Survivors
- Safe Harbour
- Prosper
- Barracuda
- Stateless
- Old School
- Newton's Law
- Under the Skin
- Saved

== Awards ==
Belinda Chayko was nominated for a number of film awards and won several.

- 2024: Mona Brand Award for Women Stage and Screen Writers
- Fires:
  - 2022: Winner, Logie Award for Most Outstanding Miniseries or Telemovie
  - 2021: Winner, AACTA Award for Best Telefeature or Mini Series
- 2019: International Emmy, Best TV Movie or Miniseries for Safe Harbour
- 2018: 8th AACTA Awards, Best Screenplay in Television, for Safe Harbour - Episode 1
- 2011: Antipodean Film Festival Grand Prix Best Feature Film: Lou
- 1990: Melbourne International Film Festival Grand Prix for Best Short Film Swimming
