= Nowhere Boys: The Book of Shadows =

2016 film by David Caesar

- Theatrical film poster
- Directed by: David Caesar
- Screenplay by: Tony Ayres; Rhys Graham; Craig Irvin
- Based on: Nowhere Boys by Tony Ayres
- Produced by: Beth Frey
- Starring: Dougie Baldwin; Joel Lok; Rahart Adams; Matt Testro; Sean Rees-Wemyss
- Narrated by: Sean Rees-Wemyss
- Cinematography: James Grant
- Edited by: Mark Atkin
- Music by: Cornel Wilczek
- Production company: Matchbox Pictures
- Release date: 1 January 2016
- Running time: 100 minutes
- Country: Australia
- Language: English

Nowhere Boys: The Book of Shadows is a 2016 Australian dark fantasy teen drama film directed by David Caesar. It is based on the teen-oriented television series Nowhere Boys created by Tony Ayres, who also co-wrote the film.

== Plot synopsis ==
Picking up one year after the boys crossed dimensions, discovered magic and battled restoring demons. Having grown apart, they are all brought back together again when Felix discovers the magically sealed Book of Shadows that unwittingly unleashes a very powerful force of chaos. The boys are then reluctantly drawn into a battle that threatens both their world and their loved ones.

== Cast ==
- Dougie Baldwin as Felix Ferne
- Joel Lok as Andrew "Andy" Lau
- Rahart Adams as Sam Conte
- Matt Testro as Jake Riles
- Sean Rees-Wemyss as Oscar Ferne
- Angourie Rice as Tegan
- Michala Banas as Phoebe Hartley
- Lester Ellis Jr. as Pete
- Darci McDonald as Ellen O' Donnell
- Giovanni Piccolo as Teacher
- Tamala Shelton as Mia
- Victoria Thaine as Alice Hartley
- Ben Keller as Bear

== Production ==
On 23 December 2014, it was announced that Screen Australia would be funding a movie based on the television series titled, Nowhere Boys: The Rise of the Bear. However, in July 2015, it was revealed that the movie's name was changed to Nowhere Boys: The Book of Shadows. The 80-minute feature-length movie was directed by David Caesar and written by Tony Ayres, Rhys Graham and Craig Irvin. It was produced by Beth Frey and executive produced by Ayres and Michael McMahon. Nowhere Boys: The Book of Shadows picks up a year after the boys crossed dimensions, discovered magic and battled the restoring demon. Having grown apart, they are drawn together again when Felix discovers a magically sealed Book of Shadows, which unwittingly releases a powerful force of chaos. The boys are reluctantly drawn into a showdown that threatens their world and loved ones.

Dougie Baldwin, Joel Lok, Rahart Adams, Matt Testro, and Sean Rees-Wemyss reprised their roles as Felix, Andy, Sam, Jake, and Oscar. Others who also returned for the movie included series regulars Darci McDonald (Ellen), Michala Banas (Phoebe), Victoria Thaine (Alice), Ben Keller (Bear), Tamala Shelton (Mia) and Michelle Gerster (Viv). Angourie Rice joined the cast. Nowhere Boys: The Book of Shadows began filming in Melbourne in July 2015. It screened in selected Australian movie theatres on 1 January 2016 and had its television premiere on ABC3 on 6 March 2016.

== Home media ==
Nowhere Boys: The Book of Shadows was released on DVD 6 March 2016.

== See also ==
- Cinema of Australia
