= Luca Sardelis =

Greek–Australian actress (born 2001)

- Born: Luca Asta Sardelis; 18 January 2001 (age 25); Adelaide, South Australia, Australia
- Occupation: Actress
- Known for: The Hunting

Luca Asta Sardelis (/ˈluːkə sɑːrˈdɛlɪs/ LOO-kə sar-DEL-iss; born 18 January 2001) is an Australian actress known for her roles in the children's TV series Sam Fox: Extreme Adventures (2014–15), and the adult drama series Barracuda (2016) and The Hunting (2019). She also appeared in the teen series Nowhere Boys (2016–18), in the adult series Deadlock (2018), and in the Netflix film A Perfect Pairing (2022) alongside Victoria Justice.

== Early life and education ==
Sardelis was born in Adelaide, South Australia, to parents Helena (née Kouzapa) and Bill Sardelis, both of Greek Cypriot descent. They resided in the Adelaide suburb of Somerton Park. She attended the local Westminster School.
