= Elias Anton =

Australian actor

- Occupation: Actor

Elias Anton is an Australian actor. For his performance in the TV series Barracuda he won the 2017 Logie Award for Most Outstanding Newcomer.

Anton's TV debut was in the lead role of Danny Kelly in Barracuda while he was still finishing his secondary schooling. He later played a lead role in the romantic drama film Of an Age and had a main role in Australia Day. He also appeared in the 2023 film Sunflower.
