= Matt Testro =

Australian actor (born 1996)

- Born: Matthew Testro; February 5, 1996 (age 30); Melbourne, Victoria, Australia
- Occupation: Actor
- Years active: 2013–present
- Known for: Jake Riles in Nowhere Boys; Freddie Hopkin in The Gloaming

Matthew Testro (born 5 February 1996) is an Australian actor. He played Jake Riles in Nowhere Boys and Freddie Hopkin in The Gloaming.

Testro has appeared in the TV shows Miss Fisher's Murder Mysteries, Glitch, Neighbours, The Doctor Blake Mysteries, 800 Words, Legends and Jack Irish. He reprised his role as Jake Riles in the teen drama film Nowhere Boys: The Book of Shadows.

== Filmography ==
Year	Title	Role	Notes
2013–2018	Nowhere Boys	Jake Riles	Main cast, Seasons 1–2, Guest Season 4
2014	Eden	Doug	
2015	Miss Fisher's Murder Mysteries	Col Richards	Episode: "Blood & Money"
2015	Glitch	Taylor	Episode: "There is No Justice"
2016	Nowhere Boys: The Book of Shadows	Jake Riles	
2016	Neighbours	Brodie Chaswick	12 episodes
2016	Bluff	Macca	Short film
2017	The Volunteer	Pete	Short film
2017	The Doctor Blake Mysteries	Ethan Young	Episode: "Measure Twice"
2018	800 Words	Joe Satino	Episode: "Episode #3.14"
2018	Legends	Sid @ 17	4 episodes
2020	The Gloaming	Freddie Hopkin	Main cast; 8 episodes
2020	2067	Young Jude Mathers	
2021	Jack Irish	Troy	4 episodes
2023	While the Men Are Away	Robert	main cast
TBD	A Little Resistance		
