= Dougie Baldwin =

Australian actor (born 1996)

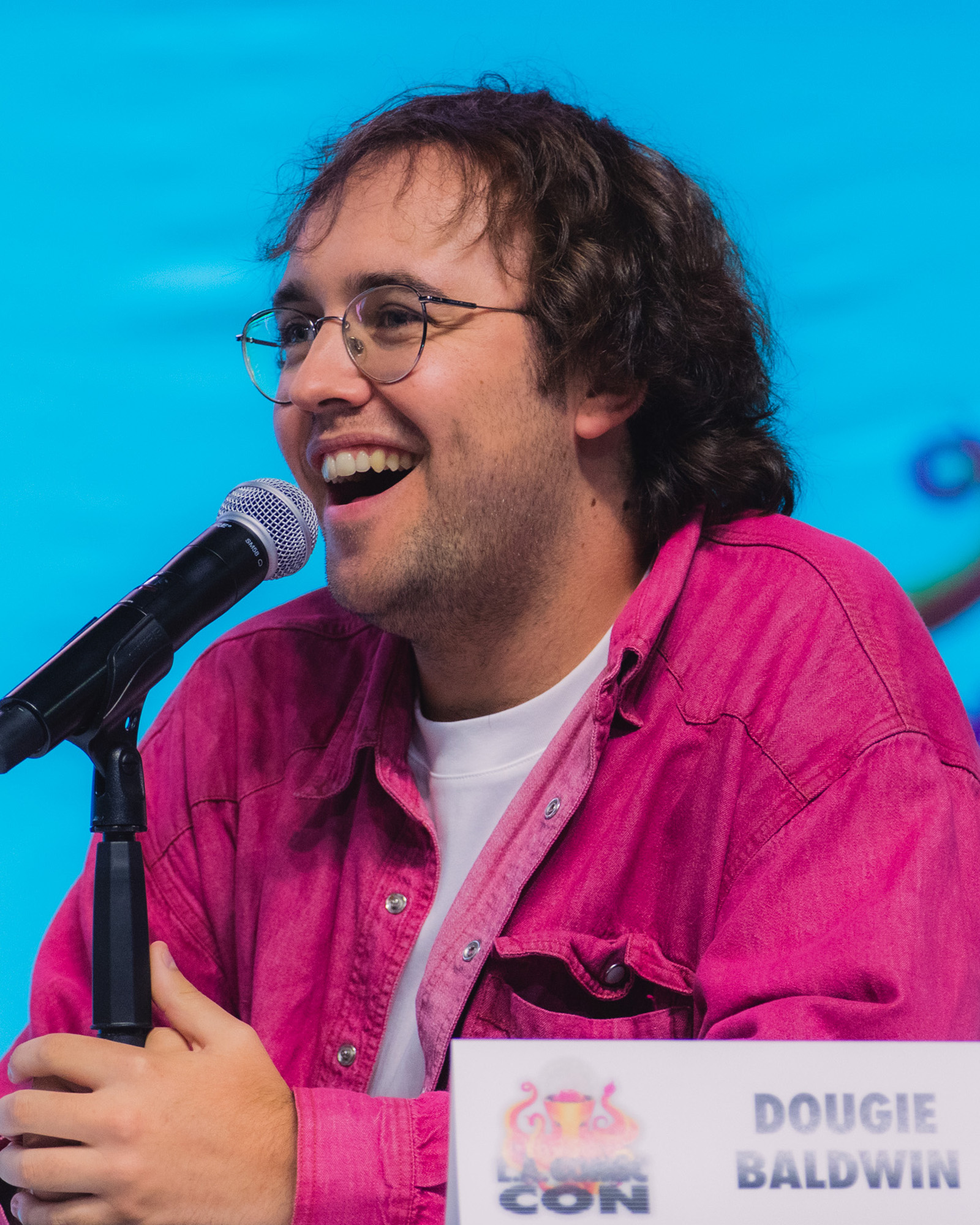
- Baldwin in 2025
- Born: 13 November 1996 (age 30); Melbourne, Victoria, Australia
- Education: Mount Erin Secondary College
- Occupation: Actor
- Years active: 2013–present
- Notable work: Disjointed; Nowhere Boys; Upper Middle Bogan; Georgie & Mandy's First Marriage

Dougie Baldwin (born 13 November 1996) is an Australian actor. He is best known for his starring role in the Netflix comedy television series Disjointed. In 2013, Baldwin became the lead role in Emmy Award–winning ABC3 children's television series Nowhere Boys, as Felix Ferne. Since 2024, he has played Connor McAllister in the CBS sitcom Georgie & Mandy's First Marriage.

== Early life ==
Baldwin has been fond of performing and being in the limelight since his early childhood and would dress up and perform in front of his family and friends as young as four years old. From the ages of 9 to 14, Baldwin attended Helen O’Grady Drama Academy, where he quickly became active in community theatre productions.

== Career ==
After drawing inspiration from his older sister Nathalie Antonia, who is also an actor, Baldwin took the step to pursue acting as a career in 2012, signing with an agent and soon cast as the lead characters in Australian television series Nowhere Boys and Upper Middle Bogan. Baldwin's career took off following the widespread success of both shows, with Nowhere Boys going on to win the Logie Award for Most Outstanding Children's Program in 2014 and 2015 consecutively.

In 2017, Baldwin was introduced to American screens starring as lead character alongside Kathy Bates in the Netflix original series Disjointed, directed by Chuck Lorre and follows the lives of employees at a Los Angeles marijuana dispensary with Baldwin's character Pete as the dispensary's quirky in-house cannabis grower.

Following a busy launch to his acting career, Baldwin moved to Paris to study at the Physical Theatre/Clown school, Ecole Philippe Gaulier, where he further developed his acting and comedy skills before returning to Melbourne. Baldwin frequently writes and performs comedy shows, with his Stand-up set "Mind How Y'Go" being nominated for two awards, including "Best Comedy Show" at the Melbourne Fringe Festival in 2022. In 2023, he was cast as Connor McAllister in the CBS sitcom Georgie & Mandy's First Marriage. The series premiered on 17 October 2024.

== Filmography ==
=== Film ===
Year	Title	Role	Notes
2013	The Turning	Vic Lang	
2016	Nowhere Boys: The Book of Shadows	Felix Ferne	
2023	Accoladia	Kirk	Short film

=== Television ===
Year	Title	Role	Notes
2013–2016	Upper Middle Bogan	Shawn Van Winkle	Main role
2013–2015	Nowhere Boys	Felix Ferne	Main role (seasons 1–2)
2014	Finding Kate	Tommy Smith	Episode: "Pilot"
2016	What Goes Around Comes Around	Daschel	Episode: "Pilot"
2016, 2019	Feedback	Lieutenant / Boring Dude	2 episodes
2017–2018	Disjointed	Pete	Main role
2024–present	Georgie & Mandy's First Marriage	Connor McAllister	Main role
