= The Home Song Stories =

- Promotional poster
- Chinese: 意
- Literal meaning: thought
- Hanyu Pinyin: yì
- Directed by: Tony Ayres
- Written by: Tony Ayres
- Produced by: Michael McMahon; Liz Watts
- Starring: Joan Chen; Joel Lok; Qi Yuwu; Irene Chen; Steven Vidler; Kerry Walker; Haven Tso; Joe Phua
- Cinematography: Nigel Bluck
- Edited by: Denise Haratzis
- Music by: Antony Partos
- Production companies: Big & Little Films
- Distributed by: Dendy Films
- Release dates: 9 February 2007 (Berlinale); 23 August 2007 (Australia)
- Running time: 103 minutes
- Country: Australia
- Languages: English; Mandarin; Cantonese

The Home Song Stories is a 2007 Australian tragedy film written and directed by Tony Ayres, loosely based on aspects of his life. It stars Joan Chen, Joel Lok, Qi Yuwu, Irene Chen, Steven Vidler and Kerry Walker.

The film premiered at the 57th Berlin International Film Festival on 9 February 2007, and was released in Australia on 23 August 2007, by Dendy Films. It was announced as the Australian entry for the Foreign Language Film category of the Oscars, but was not nominated, and received a total of nine nominations at the 2007 Inside Film Awards, winning five.

== Plot ==
The film is an autobiographical account of Tony Ayres' life at age eight, however the names have been changed. The story is narrated by Darren Yap as an adult Tom typing the story on a computer and reflecting on the story "which defines them, which shapes who they are." His mother Rose Hong was a nightclub singer in Hong Kong in 1964, where she met Bill, an Australian sailor, and married him to seek a better life in Australia, taking her daughter May and son Tom. An opening montage of scenes shows Rose making several unsuccessful attempts to establish herself with Chinese partners before moving in with Bill again.

The story begins seven years after their initial migration to Australia, with the family returning to Bill's house in Melbourne. Bill's mother, Norma, who is disapproving of the family, has moved in. When Bill leaves on a tour of duty, Rose and Norma struggle for control over the house. Soon, Rose begins to have an affair with Joe, the son of the local Chinese restaurateur, who is in his twenties. He moves in with Rose, who tells Norma he is her aunt's son. Rose and her children are eventually kicked out when Norma finds Joe in Rose's room.

Rose settles in with Joe after renting a place from a Chinese man. Their relationship begins to break down, and Rose attempts suicide, however May and Joe discover an affinity for each other which develops into a friendship. Rose, believing that May is trying to take Joe away from her, beats her and curses her. May, as a result, also attempts suicide and Rose also ends up in despair. However, the mother and daughter are reconciled in forgiveness as Rose tells May the story of the difficulties and traumatic experiences in her childhood, where she was forced into a marriage and lost her first two daughters.

The relationship between Rose and Joe collapses, and the family once again returns to Bill's home, with Norma moving out. One afternoon when Tom is walking home with his classmate they encounter Rose in the front yard, and upon overhearing a conversation between two of his classmates bagging out Rose and her clothing, Tom blocks himself from his mother completely. Rose, in the meantime, has had her dream shattered, and is contemplating returning to Hong Kong when Tom abruptly tells her his apathy.

The film culminates in the adult Tom narrating, "Of all the things I remember about my childhood, this is what I remember the most." The eight-year-old Tom wakes up early in the morning to see the light to the backyard shed on and enters to find that Rose has hanged herself. Although she does not die initially, Bill receives a phone call later on confirming her death.

The epilogue to the film shows the adult Tom and his sister May with her family (who happen to be Ayres' real life family) returning to Bill's home. He narrates again, recalling how he never shed a tear for his mother, but instead, wrote the story fully to understand what has shaped him.

The real Tom, Tony Ayres, and his sister stayed with Bill after their mother's death. May ends up marrying the teacher who became their guardian soon after Bill's death.

== Cast ==
Actor	Role
Joan Chen	Rose
Joel Lok	Tom
Qi Yuwu	Joe
Irene Chen	May
Steven Vidler	Bill
Kerry Walker	Norma
Haven Tso	Wing
Joe Phua	Tom
Darren Yap	

== Reception ==
=== Critical response ===
The Home Song Stories has an approval rating of 100% on review aggregator website Rotten Tomatoes indicating critical acclaim, based on 5 reviews, and an average rating of 7.6/10.

In a positive review critic Stefan from ScreenAnarchy praised the storytelling and performances of the cast especially Joan Chen saying "Stories from within are always heartfelt and sincere, and that's what this movie brings across - the feeling that it's from deep down, and that of honesty. Like how the movie started with the Chinese oldie "Bu Liao Qing", mirroring the style the story was told and the narrative being measured, powerful, and very meaningful."

Critic Richard Kuipers of Variety wrote a glowing review where he compared the film's cinematography to that of the works of director Wong Kar-wai, saying "luxuriant visuals that wouldn’t be out of place in 'In the Mood for Love'...." And he went onto praise Joan Chen's acting saying "In the showcase lead role, Joan Chen expertly comes to grips with the multifaceted Rose, and ensures the not always likable character is never less than compelling on screen."

=== Festivals ===
The Home Song Stories was selected to screen at the following film festivals:

- 2007 Berlin International Film Festival (8–18 February 2007)
- 2007 Adelaide Film Festival (22 February - 4 March 2007)
- 2007 Sydney Film Festival (8–24 June 2007)
- 2007 New Zealand International Film Festival (13 July - 28 November 2007)
- 2007 Bangkok International Film Festival (19–27 July 2007)
- 2007 Melbourne International Film Festival (25 July - 12 August 2007)
- 2007 Brisbane International Film Festival (2–12 August 2007)
- 2007 Edinburgh International Film Festival (15–26 August 2007)
- 2007 Toronto International Film Festival (9–15 September 2007))
- 2007 Calgary International Film Festival (20–30 September 2007)
- 2007 Hawaii International Film Festival (18–28 October 2007)
- 2007 International Eurasia Film Festival (19–28 October 2007)
- 2007 Cairo International Film Festival (27 November - 7 December 2007)
- 2007 Torino Film Festival (23 November - 1 December 2007)
- 2007 Asia Pacific Film Festival (13 November 2007)
- 2008 San Francisco International Asian American Film Festival (13–23 March 2008)
- 2008 Silk Screen Asian American Film Festival (9–18 May 2008)

=== Nominations ===
2007 Inside Film Awards

- Best Feature Film
- Best Director - Tony Ayres
- Best Actor - Joel Lok
- Best Actress - Joan Chen
- Best Cinematography - Nigel Bluck
- Best Music - Antony Partos
- Best Script - Tony Ayres
- Best Production Design - Melinda Doring
- Best Sound - Craig Carter, John Wilkinson, James Harvey & Andrew Neil

2007 Australian Film Institute Awards

- L'Oréal Paris AFI Award for Best Film
- L'Oréal Paris AFI Young Actor Award - Joel Lok
- L'Oréal Paris AFI Young Actor Award - Irene Chen
- Macquarie Private Health AFI Award for Best Screenplay - Tony Ayres
- Best Direction - Tony Ayres
- Best Lead Actor - Joel Lok
- Best Lead Actress - Joan Chen
- Best Supporting Actress - Irene Chen
- Best Cinematography - Nigel Bluck
- Best Editing - Denise Haratzis ASE
- Best Sound - Craig Carter, James Harvey, Andrew Neil & John Wilkinson
- Best Original Music Score - Antony Partos
- Best Production Design - Melinda Doring
- Best Costume Design - Cappi Ireland

2007 Golden Horse Awards

- Best Feature Film - "Home Song Stories"
- Best Leading Actress - Joan Chen
- Best Supporting Actor - Joel Lok
- Best New Performer - Joel Lok
- Best Original Screenplay - Tony Ayres
- Best Art Direction - Melinda Doring
- Best Makeup & Costume Design - Kirsten Veysey and Cappi Ireland

2007 Asia Pacific Screen Awards

- Best Performance by an Actress - Joan Chen

=== Won ===
Brisbane International Film Festival

- FIPRESCI International Jury Award

Hawaii International Film Festival

- Halekulani Golden Orchid for Best Feature Film

Torino International Film Festival

- Best Actress - Joan Chen

2007 Inside Film Awards

- Best Director - Tony Ayres
- Best Actor - Joel Lok
- Best Actress - Joan Chen
- Best Cinematography - Nigel Bluck
- Best Production Design - Melinda Doring

2007 Australian Film Institute Awards

- Best Direction - Tony Ayres
- Best Lead Actress - Joan Chen
- Best Screenplay - Tony Ayres
- Best Cinematography - Nigel Bluck
- Best Editing - Denise Haratzis
- Best Original Music Score - Antony Partos
- Best Production Design – Melinda Doring
- Best Costume Design – Cappi Ireland

2007 Golden Horse Awards

- Best Actress - Joan Chen
- Best Original Screenplay - Tony Ayres

2007 New South Wales Premier's Literary Awards

- Script Writing Award

=== Box office ===
The Home Song Stories grossed $452,488 at the box office in Australia.

== See also ==
- Cinema of Australia
- List of submissions to the 80th Academy Awards for Best Foreign Language Film
- List of Australian submissions for the Academy Award for Best Foreign Language Film
