= Joel Lok =

Australian actor (born 1994-)

Joel Lok (born September 6, 1994) is a Singaporean-Australian actor born in Singapore and based in Melbourne, starring in the Australian film in 2007, The Home Song Stories, as the young character, Tom. Joel is the youngest actor to receive an IF Award for his performance in this film. He is also known for starring in the 2013 Australian TV series Nowhere Boys as Andrew "Andy" Lau.

== Filmography ==
Year	Title	Role	Notes
2007	The Home Song Stories	Tom	Debut Film
2016	Nowhere Boys: The Book of Shadows	Andy Lau	

== Television ==
Year	Title	Role	Notes
2007	Thank God You're Here	Additional	1 Episode
2009/2010	Sea Patrol	Tiken/Gisang	2 Episodes
2012	Tangle	Year 8 Church Boy	1 Episode
2013-2015	Nowhere Boys	Andy Lau	23 Episodes
