= Tony Ayres =

Australian film director (born 1961)

- Born: 1961 (age 64–65); Portuguese Macau
- Years active: 1992–present
- Awards: AACTA Award for Best Children's Television Series; 2013 Nowhere Boys; Inside Film Award for Best Director; 2007 The Home Song Stories; Berlinale "Teddy" for Best Feature Film; 2002 Walking on Water; Australian Film Institute Award for Best Direction; 2007 The Home Song Stories; Best Screenplay (Original or Adapted); 2007 The Home Song Stories

Tony Ayres (born 1961) is an Australian showrunner, screenwriter, and director in television and film. He is most notable for his films Walking on Water (2002) and The Home Song Stories (2007), as well his work in television, including working as the showrunner on The Slap and teen adventure series Nowhere Boys (2013). He founded his own film production company, Tony Ayres Productions (TAP), in 2018.

== Early life and education ==
Tony Ayres was born in Portuguese Macau (now in China) in 1961. In 1964, Ayres' mother married an Australian sailor and migrated her family to Perth, Western Australia.

In 1972, when Ayres was 11 years old, his mother died by suicide. She was a nightclub singer.

Ayres' stepfather died of a heart attack three years after the death of his wife, and two days before he was due to remarry. Ayres and his older sister briefly lived with their stepfather's former fiancée, before being placed in the care of Ayres' history teacher (whom his sister would later end up marrying). Ayres temporarily relocated to Canberra, ACT, to study, before moving back to help care for the teacher and his children. Ayres' 2007 film The Home Song Stories is loosely based on this early period of his life.

Ayres attended Ardross Primary School and Applecross Senior High School, later studying photography and printmaking at the Australian National University in Canberra, before working as an exhibition curator. He later completed postgraduate studies in film and video at the Swinburne Film and Television School (now the University of Melbourne Faculty of VCA and MCM School of Film and Television) in Melbourne, Victoria.

== Career ==
Ayres' first feature film, Walking on Water, won the Teddy Award at the Berlin International Film Festival in 2002, and won 5 AFI Awards. His second feature film, The Home Song Stories, also premiered at the Berlin Film Festival, and won 24 Australian and international awards, including 8 AFI Awards.

Ayres was the showrunner and director of the 8-episode miniseries The Slap, which won five AACTA Awards, including Best Miniseries or TV Movie, and was nominated for a BAFTA and International Emmy. His other credits include producing the comedy series Bogan Pride with Rebel Wilson, and directing the 2009 telemovie Saved. Ayres was the showrunner for the ABC3 show Nowhere Boys, as well as executive producer on Old School and Devil's Playground.

On 31 January 2025, it was announced that Netflix series The Survivors had been announced in the 2025 Australian drama slate, and that Ayres would produce and write for the show. Ayres, alongside Matchbox Pictures, was heavily involved with the production when it was first announced in 2023. On 4 July 2025, ABC announced it was in active production with Ayres for a new series called Toxic based on the Erin Patterson "mushroom murders" trial.

== Other activities ==
In 2018, after departing Matchbox Pictures, Ayres created his production company Tony Ayres Productions (TAP).

In 2020 Ayres was appointed as a board member of the South Australian Film Corporation for three years.

== Recognition and honours ==
On 16 May 2023, Ayres was awarded an honorary degree with a Doctor of Arts in film and television from AFTRS.

== Personal life ==
Ayres is openly gay.

== Filmography ==
=== Film ===
Year	Title	Credited as			Notes
Year	Title	Director	Producer	Writer	Notes
1992	Double Trouble	Yes	No	Yes	Documentary short film
1997	Exposed	Yes	No	No	Short film
1998	Mrs. Craddock's Complaint	Yes	No	Yes	Short film
1998	China Dolls	Yes	No	Yes	Documentary film
1999	Sadness	Yes	No	No	Documentary film
2002	Walking on Water	Yes	No	No	
2007	The Home Song Stories	Yes	No	Yes	
2010	Lou	No	Yes	No	
2011	Miss South Sudan Australia	No	Yes	Yes	Documentary film
2013	The Turning	Yes	No	No	Segment: "Cockleshell"
2013	Spine	No	No	Idea contribution	Short film
2014	Cut Snake	Yes	No	No	
2016	Nowhere Boys: The Book of Shadows	No	executive	Yes	
2017	Ali's Wedding	No	executive	No	

=== Television ===
The numbers in directing and writing credits refer to the number of episodes.

Year	Title	Credited as				Network	Notes
Year	Title	Creator	Director	Writer	Executive producer	Network	Notes
1992	Six Pack	No	No	Yes (1)	No	SBS TV	Anthology series
1994	Under the Skin	No	No	Yes (1)	No	SBS TV	Anthology series
1996	Naked: Stories of Men	No	No	Yes (1)	No	ABC	Anthology series
1998	The Violent Earth	No	No	Yes (3)	No	Nine Network	Miniseries
2009	Saved	No	Yes	No	No	SBS TV	Television film
2011	The Slap	No	Yes (2)	No	No	ABC1	Producer
2013–18	Nowhere Boys	Yes	No	No	Yes	ABC3; ABC Me	Producer (series 1); Executive producer (series 2–4)
2015–19	Glitch	Yes	No	No	Yes	ABC TV	
2020	Stateless	Yes	No	No	Yes	ABC TV	
2021	Clickbait	Yes	No	Yes (5)	Yes	Netflix	Limited series
2021	Fires	Yes	No	No	Yes	ABC TV	Anthology series
2025	The Survivors	Yes	No	Yes (2)	Yes	Netflix	Limited Series

Key
†	Denotes television series that have not yet been aired

==== Executive producer-only ====
Year	Title	Network	Notes
2005	The Last Valley	ABC	Documentary film
2008	Two Men & Two Babies	SBS TV	Documentary film
2009–13	Anatomy	ABC1	Docuseries; Producer (series 1–2); Executive producer (series 3: 1 episode, series 4)
2012	The Straits	ABC1	
2012	Underground: The Julian Assange Story	Network Ten	Television film
2013	Next Stop Hollywood	ABC1	
2014	Old School	ABC1	
2014	Devil's Playground	Showcase	
2015	The Slap	NBC	Miniseries
2015	Maximum Choppage	ABC2	
2016–17	The Family Law	SBS	Series 1–2
2016–18	Wanted	Seven Network	
2017	Seven Types of Ambiguity	ABC TV	
2021	Creamerie	TVNZ OnDemand	Web series

==== Producer-only ====
Year	Title	Network	Notes	Ref
2008	Bogan Pride	SBS TV		
2016	Barracuda	ABC TV	Miniseries	
2023	The Spooky Files	ABC TV	TV series	

== Awards ==
Tony Ayres won the award of Best Dramatic Feature at the 2015 Byron Bay International Film Festival for the film Cut Snake.
