= 2001 Australian Film Institute Awards =

Film awards in Australia

43rd Australian Film Institute Awards
- Date: 16 November 2001
- Site: Melbourne Exhibition Buildings

Highlights
- Best Film: Lantana
- Best Direction: Ray Lawrence; Lantana
- Best Actor: Anthony LaPaglia; Lantana
- Best Actress: Kerry Armstrong; Lantana
- Supporting Actor: Vince Colosimo; Lantana
- Supporting Actress: Rachael Blake; Lantana
- Most awards: Feature film: Lantana (7)
- Most nominations: Feature film: Lantana (13); Television: SeaChange (9)

The 43rd Australian Film Institute Awards (generally known as the 2001 AFI Awards), were a series of awards presented by the Australian Film Institute (AFI). The awards celebrated the best in Australian feature film, television, documentary and short film productions of 2001. The ceremony took place at the Melbourne Exhibition Buildings on 16 November 2001.

== Winners and nominees ==
The nominations were announced on 27 October 2001. Leading the feature film nominees was Lantana, based on the play Speaking in Tongues by Andrew Bovell, with a total of 13 nominations. It was nominated in every category except for Best Cinematography. The ABC drama SeaChange, about a city lawyer who relocates to the coastal town of Pearl Bay and becomes a local magistrate, gained the most television nominations with a total of nine.

Two new awards were introduced this year; the AFI Screenwriting Prize, sponsored by Harper's Bazaar magazine and the only award that carried a cash prize (A$10,000), and an award for Global Achievement.

Ray Lawrence's psychological thriller, Lantana, exploring complex relationships between characters in the film, received the most awards for any production, securing all seven top awards. Kerry Armstrong won the Best Actress Award for her performance in the film, and in an unprecedented occurrence, also won Best Actress in a Television Drama Series for her role in SeaChange. In the television category SeaChange, The Secret Life of Us, My Brother Jack and My Husband, My Killer all secured two awards apiece.

Winners are listed first and highlighted in boldface.

=== Feature film ===
Best Film	Best Direction
**Lantana – Jan Chapman**; Moulin Rouge! – Martin Brown, Baz Luhrmann and Fred Baron; The Bank – John Maynard; The Dish – Santo Cilauro, Michael Hirsh, Tom Gleisner, Jane Kennedy and Rob Sitch	**Ray Lawrence – Lantana**; Baz Luhrmann – Moulin Rouge!; David Caesar – Mullet; Robert Connolly – The Bank
Best Performance by an Actor in a Leading Role	Best Performance by an Actress in a Leading Role
**Anthony LaPaglia – Lantana**; Ewan McGregor – Moulin Rouge!; Ben Mendelsohn – Mullet; David Wenham – The Bank	**Kerry Armstrong – Lantana**; Alice Ansara – La Spagnola; Lola Marceli – La Spagnola; Nicole Kidman – Moulin Rouge!
Best Performance by an Actor in a Supporting Role	Best Performance by an Actress in a Supporting Role
**Vince Colosimo – Lantana**; Alex Dimitriades – La Spagnola; Richard Roxburgh – Moulin Rouge!; Andrew S. Gilbert – Mullet	**Daniela Farinacci – Lantana**; Lourdes Bartolome – La Spagnola; Rachael Blake – Lantana; Belinda McClory – Mullet
Best Original Screenplay	Best Adapted Screenplay
**Robert Connolly – The Bank**; Anna-Maria Monticelli – La Spagnola; David Caesar – Mullet; Chris Anastassiades – Yolngu Boy	**Andrew Bovell – Lantana**; Richard Lowenstein – He Died with a Felafel in His Hand; Daniel Keene – Silent Partner; Anne Kennedy – The Monkey's Mask
Best Cinematography	Best Editing
**Donald M. McAlpine ACS/ASC – Moulin Rouge!**; Steve Arnold ACS – La Spagnola; Tristan Milani ACS – The Bank; Brad Shield – Yolngu Boy	**Jill Bilcock – Moulin Rouge!**; Alexandre de Franceshi – La Spagnola; Karl Sodersten – Lantana; Ken Sallows – Yolngu Boy
Best Original Music Score	Best Sound
**Cezary Skubiszewski** **– La Spagnola**; Paul Kelly, Shane O'Mara, Steve Hadley, Bruce Haymes and Peter Luscombe – Lantana; Alan John – The Bank; Edmund Choi – The Dish	**Andy Nelson, Roger Savage and Guntis Sics – Moulin Rouge!**; Peter Grace, Phil Judd and Andrew Plain – La Spagnola; Syd Butterworth, Andrew Plain and Robert Sullivan – Lantana; Phil Heywood, Sam Petty and Andrew Ramage – The Bank
Best Production Design	Best Costume Design
**Catherine Martin – Moulin Rouge!**; Dee Molineaux – La Spagnola; Kim Buddee – Lantana; Luigi Pittorino – The Bank	**Catherine Martin and Angus Strathie – Moulin Rouge!**; Margot Wilson – La Spagnola; Margot Wilson – Lantana; Annie Marshall – The Bank

=== Television ===
Best Episode in a Television Drama Series	Best Episode in a Long Running Television Drama Series
**SeaChange: Series 3, Episode 8 "I Name Thee Bay of Pearls" (ABC) – Sally Ayre-Smith**; Love Is a Four-Letter Word: Episode 13 "Split" (ABC) –Rosemary Blight and Tim Pye; SeaChange: Series 3, Episode 13 "Half Life" (ABC) – Sally Ayre-Smith; The Games: Series 2, Episode 10 "Solar" (ABC) – John Clarke, Ross Stevenson and Mark Ruse; The Secret Life of Us: Episode 16 "The Butterfly Effect" (ABC) – John Edwards and Amanda Higgs	**Something in the Air: Episode 224 "That One Defining Moment" (ABC) – Roger Le Mesurier, Roger Simpson and Alan Hardy**; All Saints: Series 4, Episode 22 "The Sign" (Seven Network) – Di Drew; Something in the Air: Episode 227 "Into Thy Hands" (ABC) – Roger Le Mesurier, Roger Simpson and Alan Hardy; Something in the Air: Episode 244 "Living in the Past" (ABC) – Roger Le Mesurier, Roger Simpson and Alan Hardy
Best Children's Television Drama	Best Telefeature or Mini Series
**Cybergirl: "Episode 1" (Network Ten) – Jonathan M. Shiff and Daniel Scharf**; Crash Zone: Series 2, Episode 11 "Skin Deep" (Seven Network) – Patricia Edgar and Bernadette O'Mahoney; Li'l Horrors: Episode 13 "Trouble Double" (ABC) – Stuart Menzies and Tony Wright; Thunderstone III: Series 3, Episode 13 "Episode 52" (Network Ten) – Jonathan M. Shiff and Daniel Scharf	**My Brother Jack (Network Ten) – Sue Milliken, Andrew Wiseman and Richard Keddie**; Changi (ABC) – Bill Hughes; Do or Die (Seven Network) – John Edwards and Lavinia Warner; My Husband, My Killer (Network Ten) – David Gould, Des Monaghan and Anthony Buckley
Best Lead Actor in a Television Drama	Best Lead Actress in a Television Drama
**Samuel Johnson – The Secret Life of Us (Network Ten)**; John Howard – SeaChange (ABC); William McInnes – SeaChange (ABC); Nicholas Bell – The Games (ABC)	**Kerry Armstrong – SeaChange (ABC)**; Kate Beahan – Love Is a Four Letter Word (ABC); Sigrid Thornton – SeaChange (ABC); Gina Riley – The Games (ABC); Claudia Karvan – The Secret Life of Us (Network Ten)
Best Guest or Supporting Actor in a Television Drama	Best Guest or Supporting Actress in a Television Drama
**Gary Day – Blue Heelers: Series 8, Episode 29 "The Poisoned Fruit - Part 2" (Seven Network)**; Steve Adams – Something in the Air: Episode 224 "That One Defining Moment" (ABC); Travis McMahon – Stingers: Series 4, Episode 2 "Rich Man's World" (Nine Network); Damian Walshe-Howling – The Secret Life of Us: Episode 10 "State of Limbo" (Network Ten)	**Catherine McClements – The Secret Life of Us: Episode 11 "Love Sucks" (Network Ten)**; Carol Burns – Blue Heelers: Series 8, Episode 3 "Deadly Fascination" (Seven Network); Joanne Priest – Love Is a Four Letter Word: Episode 13 "Split" (ABC); Rhondda Findleton – Stingers: Series 4, Episode 5 "Fool To Want You" (Nine Network)
Best Lead Actor in a Tele-feature or Mini Series	Best Lead Actress in a Telefeature or Mini Series
**David Field – My Husband, My Killer (Network Ten)**; Geoff Morrell – Changi (ABC); Simon Lyndon – My Brother Jack (Network Ten); William McInnes – My Brother Jack (Network Ten)	**Angie Milliken – My Brother Jack (Network Ten)**; Greta Scacchi – The Farm (ABC); Ellouise Rothwell – My Brother Jack (Network Ten)
Best Direction	Best Screenplay
**Peter Andrikidis – My Husband, My Killer (Network Ten)**; Rowan Woods – Do or Die (Seven Network); Ken Cameron – My Brother Jack (Network Ten); Stuart McDonald – SeaChange: Series 3, Episode 8 "I Name Thee Bay of Pearls" (ABC); Roger Hodgman – The Secret Life of Us: Episode 16 "The Butterfly Effect" (Network Ten)	**John Clarke and Ross Stevenson – The Games: Series 2, Episode 10 "Solar" (ABC)**; John Doyle – Changi (ABC); Andrew Knight and Andrea Denholm – SeaChange: Series 3, Episode 8 "I Name Thee Bay of Pearls" (ABC); Hannie Rayson and Andrea Denholm – SeaChange: Series 3, Episode 11 "Love in the Time of Coleridge" (ABC)

=== Non-feature film ===
Best Documentary	Best Direction in a Documentary
**Facing the Music** **– Bob Connolly and Robin Anderson**; Cunnamulla – Dennis O'Rourke; Playing the Game: "Episode 3" – Andrew Ogilvie and Peter du Cane; Wonderboy – Andrew Wiseman and Richard Keddie	**Dennis O'Rourke – Cunnamulla**; Bob Connolly and Robin Anderson – Facing the Music; Vanessa Gorman – Losing Layla; Andrew Wiseman – Wonderboy
Best Short Fiction Film	Best Short Animation
**The Big House** **– Rachel Ward**; Delivery Day – Jane Manning; Inja (Dog) – Steve Pasvolsky; Saturn's Return – Wenona Byrne	**Living with Happiness** **– Sarah Watt**; Bad Baby Amy – Anthony Lucas; The Collective – Norah Mulroney; The Exploding Woman – Nancy Allen
Best Screenplay in a Short Film	Best Cinematography in a Non-Feature Film
**Kris Mrksa – Sparky D Comes to Town**; Khoa Do – Delivery Day; Steve Pasvolsky – Inja (Dog); Rachel Ward – The Big House	**Kim Batterham – One Night the Moon**; John Brawely – Bird in the Wire; Andre Fleuren – City of Dreams; Wade Fairley – Island Life: Macquarie Island
Best Editing in a Non-Feature Film	Best Sound in a Non-Feature Film
**Emma Hay – Secret Safari**; Melanie Sandford – Australians At War: "Episode 3"; Rebecca Murphy – Rubber Gloves; Merlin Cornish and Robert Forsyth – Stump	**Robin Anderson, Andrew Plain and Robert Sullivan – Facing the Music**; Julian Ellingworth and John Patterson – Australians At War: "Episode 3"; Sam Petty and Yulia Ackerholt – ICQ; Katy Wood – The Collective

=== Additional Awards ===
Young Actor's Award	Best Foreign Film
**John Sebastian Pilakui – Yolngu Boy**; Joshua Jay – All Saints: Series 4, Episode 22 "The Sign" (Seven Network)	**Crouching Tiger, Hidden Dragon** **– Ang Lee and James Schamus**; Almost Famous – Ian Bryce and Cameron Crowe; Billy Elliot – Tessa Ross, David M. Thompson and Natascha Wharton; In the Mood for Love – Wong Kar-Wai
Open Craft AFI Award – Television	Open Craft AFI Award – Non Feature Film
**Do or Die** **(Seven Network) – Shawn Seet (for Editing)**; Love is a Four Letter Word: Episode 13 "Split" (ABC) – Henry Dangar and Nicole La Macchia (for Editing); My Brother Jack (Network Ten) – Jo Ford (for Production Design); My Husband, My Killer (Network Ten) – Peter Best (for Original Score)	**One Night the Moon** **– Mairead Hannan, Kev Carmody and Paul Kelly (for Original Score)**; Circa – Sally Bongers and Paul Elliot (for Original Concept & Realisation); Harvey – Peter McDonald (for Special Effects); Australians At War: "Episode 3" – Michael Caulfield (for Screenplay)

=== Individual Awards ===
Award	Winner
Byron Kennedy Award	Ian David
Raymond Longford Award	David Stratton
Global Achievement Award	Russell Crowe
AFI Screenwriting Prize	Andrew Bovell

== Multiple nominations ==
The following films received multiple nominations.

- 13 nominations: Lantana
- 11 nominations: La Spagnola
- 10 nominations: Moulin Rouge!
- 9 nominations: The Bank

== Notes ==
1.The AACTA website (incorrectly) lists Greta Scacchi as the winner of Best Lead Actress in a Telefeature or Mini Series as opposed to Angie Milliken.

== See also ==
- AACTA Awards
