= List of Australian films of 2001 =

== 2001 ==
Title	Director	Cast	Genre	Notes
The Bank	Robert Connolly	David Wenham, Anthony LaPaglia, Sibylla Budd		
Big Shots	Steven Mayas		Comedy	
Bird in the Wire	Phillip Donnellon	Kate Jane Norris, Christine Wilson, Valerie Bean	Comedy Short Film	
Black Chicks Talking	Leah Purcell	Deborah Mailman	Documentary	
Blue Neon	Matt Bird	John van Rooyen, Boyd Britton, Petra Lane, Nadia Townsend, John Marsh	Thriller	
Cats & Dogs	Lawrence Guterman	Jeff Goldblum, Elizabeth Perkins, Alexander Pollock	Spy	
Charlotte Gray	Gillian Armstrong	Cate Blanchett, James Fleet, Abigail Cruttenden		
Crocodile Dundee in Los Angeles	Simon Wincer	Paul Hogan, Linda Kozlowski, Jere Burns		
Cubbyhouse				
Dalkeith				
Den	Greg Arce	Greg Arce, Stephanie Rettig, Lee Schall, Dana J. Ryan, Sabrina O'Neil	Thriller	
The Diaries of Vaslav Nijinsky				
Different Shades of Pink				
Don't Say a Word				USA/AUS co-production
Elixir				
Facing the Music				
He Died with a Felafel in His Hand	Richard Lowenstein	Noah Taylor, Emily Hamilton, Sophie Lee	Comedy	
Hildegarde				
Instant Karma	Martyn Park	Amos Szeps, Emily Stewart, David Gambin	Crime / Drama	
La Spagnola	Steve Jacobs	Lola Marceli, Alice Ansara, Lourdes Bartolomé	Drama	
Lantana	Ray Lawrence	Anthony LaPaglia, Kerry Armstrong, Geoffrey Rush	Drama	AACTA Award for Best Film
Last Mail from Birdsville				
The Last Secret				
Let's Get Skase	Matthew George	Lachy Hulme, Alex Dimitriades, Craig McLachlan	Comedy	
Like It Is				
Living with Happiness				
Local Dive				
Looking for Horses				
Losing Layla				
Lotto				
Low Fat Elephants				
Mamadrama: The Jewish Mother in Cinema				
Mallboy	Vincent Giarrusso	Kane McNay, Nell Feeney-Connor, Brett Swain, Maxie Rickard, Sarah Naumoff, Ryan Paine, Brett Tucker, Sheryl Munks, Vincent Gil, Jo Kennedy, Damien Richardson		
Man Down				
The Man Who Sued God	Mark Joffe	Billy Connolly Judy Davis Emily Browning	Comedy	
Martin Four				
Matter of Life				
Melancholy				
Moloch				
Moulin Rouge!	Baz Luhrmann	Nicole Kidman, Ewan McGregor, Jim Broadbent		Entered into the 2001 Cannes Film Festival
Mr. Wasinski's Song				
Much Ado About Something				
Mullet	David Caesar	Ben Mendelsohn, Susie Porter		
Murder Landscapes				
My Mother India				
My Old China				
Neophytes and Neon Lights	Shane T. Hall	Matt Doran	Science Fiction	
The New Crusaders				
Night Trade				
The Old Man Who Read Love Stories				
One Night the Moon	Rachel Perkins	Paul Kelly, Kaarin Fairfax, Memphis Kelly, Kelton Pell, Ruby Hunter, Chris Haywood, David Field		
One Step Closer				
The Other Son				
Una Passione adatta				
Picture Perfect				
Pink Pyjamas				
The Pitch				
Remembering Country				
Rogue				
Rooms for Rent				
Rubber Gloves				
Rushing to Sunshine: Seoul Diaries				
Russian Doll				
Saving Silverman				
S-Crash				
The Secret Safari				
Seek & Ye' Shall Find				
Serenades				
Show Me Your Pic				
Silent Partner				
Slipper				
The Smell That Killed Him				
Southern Cross				
Speed City				
Spudmonkey				
Staying Out				
Stories & Songs of the People				
Stud				
Sucker				
Sweet Thing				
Tanaka				
Taste				
Teardrops				
Tempted				
Tickler				
Tree				
Turn Me On: The History of the Vibrator				
The Upsell	Nathan Hill		Short comedy	
Vitalogy			Short	
The Walk	Carlotta Moye			
Walnut & Honeysuckle	Lucinda Clutterbuck		Short animation	
When Strangers Appear	Scott Reynolds		Action drama	
WillFull				
Wonderboy				
Woodstock for Capitalists				
Yarrabah Teenagers	Judi Levine		Documentary	
Yolngu Boy	Stephen Johnson		Drama	

== See also ==
- 2001 in Australia
- 2001 in Australian television
- List of 2001 box office number-one films in Australia
