= Kerry Armstrong =

Australian actress (born 1958)

- Born: Kerry Michelle Armstrong; 12 September 1958 (age 68); Melbourne, Victoria, Australia
- Education: St Leonard’s College; HB Studio
- Occupations: Actress; author
- Years active: 1974–present
- Spouses: Brad Robinson (m. 1981) Alexander Bernstein (m. 1981) Mac Gudgeon (m. 1990) Mark Croft (m. 1996–2001)
- Children: 3

Kerry Michelle Armstrong (born 12 September 1958) is an Australian actress and author. She is one of only two actresses to win two Australian Film Institute Awards in the same year, winning Best Actress in a Leading Role for Lantana and Best Actress in a Leading Role in a Television Drama for SeaChange in 2001.

After early television roles in Australia including Prisoner (1979) and Skyways (1980), Armstrong moved to the United States in 1981, where she played Ophelia in Hamlet and Isabella in Measure for Measure at the Arena Stage in Washington, D.C., and had a role in the soap opera Dynasty (1985–1986). She returned to Australia in 1987. Her other television roles include MDA (2002–2003) and Bed of Roses (2008–2011).

== Early life and education ==
Kerry Michelle Armstrong was born in Melbourne, to parents Bev and Norm Armstrong and grew up in the beachside suburb of Beaumaris alongside sister Kim.

At the age of eleven, Armstrong performed in a school production of The Little Prince, as the narrator. Soon after, her father's engineering career saw the family relocate to Barcelona for two years. Back in Melbourne, Armstrong attended St Leonard's College, in Brighton, where her high school drama teacher considered her a standout amongst the other students.

When she was 15, Armstrong attended a cattle call for theatre company J. C. Williamson's in Melbourne. British comedian Sid James was there and offered her a role in an Australian touring production of The Mating Season, believing her to be 21. Her parents forbade her to accept the role at first, but eventually relented, Armstrong travelling for nine months with the production. She continued her studies by correspondence, before returning to school in year 11. Then, in 1977, she left once more, to perform in a production of Doctor in Love.

== Career ==
=== Early years ===
Armstrong's first appearance on television in the early 1970s was as a weather presenter on GTV-9 in Melbourne, succeeding Delvene Delaney in the position. When she applied for the role she was still a teenage schoolgirl, but led them to believe she was 22. The first publicly aired word she ever spoke was "Goodnight!"

Armstrong scored her first role in a television series in Marion before landing small roles in soap operas The Sullivans, and Skyways and Bruce Beresford's award-winning 1977 film The Getting of Wisdom at the age of 16, alongside Sigrid Thornton. She landed her big break in prison drama Prisoner, playing Lynn Warner in the first 44 episodes. In 1981, she co-hosted the Network Ten series Together Tonight, with Greg Evans.

=== United States ===
Armstrong moved to the United States in 1981, where she studied under Herbert Berghof and Uta Hagen at the HB Studio in New York City on an acting scholarship. She graduated as a full-time student.

While studying, Armstrong worked as maitre d’ at Central Park restaurant Tavern on the Green before scoring acting work. With the studio's Playwrights Foundation, she played Juliet in Shakespeare's Romeo and Juliet, Ophelia in Hamlet, and Isabella in Measure for Measure at the Arena Stage in Washington, DC. She also starred in Hamlet alongside Anthony Hopkins and as Christine in Tom Stoppard's Dalliance at the Long Wharf Theatre in New Haven, Connecticut.

On television, Armstrong landed an ongoing role in long-running daytime soap opera One Life to Live, She appeared in several episodes of Dynasty as Elena, Duchess of Branagh. and guest starred in the 1984 Murder, She Wrote episode "Death Takes a Curtain Call".

Alongside other actors including John Cusack, Tim Robbins and Helen Hunt, Armstrong was a founding member of The Actors' Gang, an experimental theatre company that continues to tour internationally with adaptations of the classics more than 30 years later. In 1986, Armstrong, Cusack and Robbins auditioned for Saturday Night Live, but only Armstrong was offered a part, which she subsequently declined. The same year, she was offered a three-picture deal with Universal Studios, but it clashed with her stage role in Measure for Measure in Washington, which she ultimately chose. Confidence was also sometimes a barrier for Armstrong, costing her a role in 1987 thriller Fatal Attraction.

=== Australian return ===
In 1987, Armstrong returned to Australia upon the death of her grandmother. She appeared in the film Grievous Bodily Harm (1988) with Colin Friels. She also resumed acting in Australian television series, including Police Rescue, Ocean Girl, Halifax f.p., Blue Heelers and award-winning 1990 miniseries Come in Spinner, in a lead role alongside Rebecca Gibney.

Armstrong was nominated for a 1991 AFI Award for Best Actress for her role in the drama film Hunting, in which she starred with Guy Pearce. The film was released by Paramount in the US. In 1993, she had a regular role in sitcom All Together Now, as Beth Sumner. From 1993 to 1994, she had a recurring role as Jady in Halfway Across the Galaxy and Turn Left. She also appeared in an episode of American action adventure series High Tide in 1994.

Armstrong featured in 1997 US miniseries 20,000 Leagues Under the Sea opposite Bryan Brown and Michael Caine. The same year, she was in drama film Amy with Ben Mendelsohn and Rachel Griffiths, followed by 1998 film Justice with Marcus Graham.

In 1998, Armstrong was offered the role of Heather Jelly in the television series SeaChange, the ever-devoted but long-suffering wife of corrupt local mayor Bob (John Howard). The role won her critical acclaim and garnered several awards.

When SeaChange ended in 2000, Armstrong almost walked away from acting, after she lost her confidence. However, that changed when film producer Jan Chapman had the script for 2001 film Lantana delivered to her door, convinced she was the right fit for the lead role of Sonja Zat. The film, directed by Ray Lawrence, starred an ensemble cast including Anthony LaPaglia, Barbara Hershey, Geoffrey Rush, Glenn Robbins, and Vince Colosimo. and Armstrong went on to win an Inside Film (IF) Award, an AFI Award and a Film Critics Circle of Australia Award for her performance. The same year she won another AFI Award, for the final season of SeaChange, making her the first actress to win the Best Performance by an Actress award in both the feature film and television categories in the same year.

In 2002, Armstrong joined the cast of medico-legal drama MDA on ABC alongside Jason Donovan and Shane Bourne. However, she left the series at the end of its second season, with her character, Dr Ella Davis, leaving the firm that was the focus of the show. After MDA, Armstrong appeared in the films One Perfect Day (2004), Oyster Farmer (2004) playing the role of Trish opposite Alex O'Loughlin (who went on to Hawaii Five-O fame) and dance mockumentary Razzle Dazzle (2007), as overbearing stage mother, Justine Morgan, for which she received her fifth AFI Award nomination. In 2006, she competed on season five of Dancing with the Stars in 2006. Armstrong and dance partner, Christopher Ryan, were the third couple eliminated from the show.

In 2008, ABC TV screened six-part series Bed of Roses, with Armstrong in the lead role as Louisa Atherton. The same year, she starred in US film Reservations, as a woman battling breast cancer – a role written especially for her, after the producer had seen Armstrong in Lantana. In 2010, Bed of Roses returned for a second season on the ABC, followed by a third and final season in 2011, with Armstrong resuming the role. In the same year, she starred in the short film The Forgotten Men, alongside Jack Thompson and Gyton Grantley.

In 2013, Armstrong made her directorial debut with the play The Woolgatherer at La Mama Theatre, for the Melbourne Fringe Festival which was met with rave reviews. She then directed a series of short plays for The Melbourne Storytelling Festival and eleven short films.

After a five year hiatus from acting, 2016 saw Armstrong return to Australian screens in the series The Wrong Girl for Network Ten, playing Mimi Woodward, divorced mother of protagonist Lily, played by Jessica Marais. She also filmed the features Pawno (2016) and 2.22 (2017).

In 2018, Armstrong appeared as a contestant on reality show I'm a Celebrity...Get Me Out of Here!, alongside AFL player Josh Gibson, tennis player Bernard Tomic, Australian Idol alum Shannon Noll, model Simone Holtznagel, 1980s US pop singer Tiffany, boxer Anthony Mundine, reality star Jackie Gilles, comedians Fiona O'Loughlin and Peter Rowsthorn. politician David Oldfield and his wife The Real Housewives of Sydney star Lisa Oldfield. Armstrong was the second celebrity eliminated (after Tiffany) and fourth overall celebrity to leave (after Tomic and Mundine quit), in the third week.

From 2018 to 2020, Armstrong had a regular role on long-running soap opera Neighbours, playing the villainous Alice Wells. She also reprised her role of Heather Jelly on the reboot of SeaChange in 2019. The following year, she appeared in feature film The Very Excellent Mr Dundee alongside Paul Hogan and John Cleese.

In 2021, Armstrong appeared in season 2 of ABC comedy series Frayed, as family matriarch Jean. The same year, she also featured in award-winning eight-part comedy series Spreadsheet for streaming service Paramount+. In 2022, she had a recurring guest role as Summer in mystery-drama series Darby and Joan, opposite Bryan Brown and Greta Scacchi.

In 2024, Armstrong was announced as part of the cast for the Stan Christmas movie Nugget Is Dead?: A Christmas Story. She also performed opposite Colin Friels in a Sydney Theatre Company stage production of Australian play Into the Shimmering World.

In January 2026, Armstrong is set to play a controlling mother in upcoming drama series Dear Life (formerly titled Love Divided By Eleven) on streaming service Stan, opposite Brooke Satchwell, Ryan Johnson and Deborah Mailman.

=== Teaching ===
During a hiatus from acting, Armstrong taught acting at Melbourne's 16th Street Acting Studio for three years from 2011 to 2013. She also taught a masterclass at New York's Herbert Bergof Studio, where she had previously trained as a young actor.

In 2026, Armstrong will teach a masterclass series in Accelerated Screen Performance at Film & Television Studio International in Melbourne, focusing on the Stanislavski Technique.

=== Writing ===
Armstrong wrote a self-help book, The Circles, published on 1 November 2003. She described the book as a practical exercise in empowering people.

Her second book, Fool on the Hill, published in March 2006, is about the nature of personality.

A travel guide, Newcomer's Handbook for New York City was co-edited with Belden Merims in 1996.

== Other activities ==
Armstrong has worked with several charitable organisations including Childwise, Big hART, and Cure for Life Foundation, which sponsors research into brain tumour treatments. In 2006, she represented Cure for Life in season five of Dancing with the Stars. In 2018, while competing on I'm a Celebrity...Get Me Out of Here!, she represented children's cancer charity Camp Quality.

Armstrong publicly opposed the War in Iraq, and in protest, sat on the steps of the Victorian Parliament in a purple bra to draw attention to her cause.

In October 2008 Armstrong appeared as the face of a "myth-busting" advertising campaign for Coca-Cola Amatil, created by the agency Singleton Ogilvy & Mather. Titled "Kerry Armstrong on Motherhood and Myth Busting", the print advertisement purported to correct "myths and conjecture" about Coca-Cola drink products, rejecting suggestions that Coca-Cola "rots your teeth", "makes you fat", and is "packed with caffeine". In April 2009, the Australian Competition & Consumer Commissioner ruled that the Coca-Cola advertisements in which Armstrong appeared were misleading.

After having previously sailed when she lived on boats in New York's Long Island, and also sailing at Merricks and Mornington yacht clubs in Victoria, Armstrong participated in the 75th Sydney to Hobart Yacht Race as a rookie crew member on the Tasmanian 62-foot yacht 'Magic Miles' in 2019.

== Personal life ==
In 1981, Armstrong married Australian Crawl rhythm guitarist Brad Robinson when she was 23, after he proposed to her at bottom of a water slide in Surfers Paradise, Queensland. The ring was stolen, when she lived in New York and thieves broke into her unit.

Armstrong and Robinson co-wrote "Easy on Your Own", a track on Australian Crawl's second album Sirocco and B-side to the single "Errol". In 2003, Armstrong reflected, "I met Braddy at that time and he was the first person who absolutely, implicitly understood me and who loved me for every aspect of what I did and who I loved. I had a complete... a resting place finally."

On the advice of her US agent and with Robinson's consent, she divorced and married a friend, Alexander Bernstein (son of Leonard Bernstein), in order to resolve visa issues and allow her to live and work in the United States. Armstrong only had a professional arrangement with Bernstein, but her long distance from Robinson dissolved their relationship, and they divorced later that decade. Robinson died from cancer in 1996.

In early 2018, she described the relationship with Robinson, "I think everyone should hold on to their first great love and be grateful... [but] I know there are no accidents because I have come out of it with these three absolutely gorgeous young men as sons."

While in the US, Armstrong became romantically involved with American actor Tim Robbins, meeting him at a casting session, before they founded The Actors' Gang together. Robbins went on to marry Susan Sarandon. Armstrong described Robbins as "gorgeous, but way too bossy".

In 1990, she married screenwriter/producer Mac Gudgeon when their son was three months old. The marriage to Gudgeon ended, and in 1996 she married builder Mark Croft, with whom she has twin sons. Armstrong and Croft separated in 2001.

In 2000, on her final day of filming for SeaChange, Armstrong's cottage in Eltham, Victoria, burnt down due to a faulty wall heater. She lost everything, except for three paintings her sons had created for her as children. As of 2008, Armstrong lived with her three sons in the Yarra Valley. By 2019, Armstrong had been living on the Mornington Peninsula for several years.

Arnstrong's likeness was painted by artist Vicki Sullivan for 'Portraits: Sullivan & Bilbrough', an exhibition at Mornington Peninsula Regional Gallery in 2016.

During an episode of I'm A Celebrity... Get Me Out Of Here! in 2018, Armstrong revealed that fellow Australian actress Nicole Kidman did not handle it well when Armstrong won Best Actress (for Lantana) over Kidman (for Moulin Rouge!) at the 2001 Australian Film Institute Awards. After Russell Crowe, who was presenting the award, announced the winner, Kidman left the room, "visibly unimpressed".

== Awards ==
Year	Work	Award	Category	Result	Ref.
1990	Hunting	AFI Awards	Best Actress	Nominated	
2000	SeaChange	Logie Awards	Outstanding Actress in TV Series	Nominated	
2001	SeaChange	Logie Awards	Outstanding Actress in TV Series	Won	
2001	SeaChange	AFI Awards	Best Actress in a Television Series	Won	
2001	Lantana	IF Awards	Best Female Ensemble Cast	Won	
2001	Lantana	AFI Awards	Best Actress in a Feature Film	Won	
2001	Lantana	Film Critics Circle of Australia Awards	Best Actress	Won	
2001	Lantana	Golden Globe Awards	Best Actress	Nominated	
2001	Lantana	London Critics Circle Film Awards	Actress of the Year	Nominated	
2001	N/A	Australian Government	Centenary Medal for significant service to the theatre, television, and film industries	Honoured	
2002	MDA	AFI Awards	Best Actress in a Television Series	Nominated	
2005	Oyster Farmer	Film Critics Circle of Australia Awards	Best Actress in a Supporting Role	Nominated	
2007	Razzle Dazzle: A Journey into Dance	AFI Awards	Best Lead Actress	Nominated	
2008	Razzle Dazzle: A Journey into Dance	Film Critics Circle of Australia Awards	Best Actress	Nominated	
2011	Bed of Roses	Equity Ensemble Awards	Outstanding Performance by an Ensemble in a Drama Series	Nominated	
2012	Bed of Roses	Equity Ensemble Awards	Outstanding Performance by an Ensemble in a Drama Series	Nominated	
2016	Pawno	AACTA Awards	Best Supporting Actress	Nominated	
2017	Pawno	Film Critics Circle of Australia Awards	Best Actress in a Supporting Role	Nominated	

== Filmography ==
=== Film ===
Year	Title	Role	Notes
1977	The Getting of Wisdom	Kate	Feature film
1985	Key Exchange	The Beauty	Feature film US
1988	Grievous Bodily Harm	Annie	Feature film
1991	Hunting	Michelle Harris	Feature film
1995	The Good Looker		Documentary
1997	Amy	Sarah Trendle	Feature film
1998	Denial	Mother	Short film
1998	Justice	Annie Martin	Feature film
1998	Hephzibah	Narrator	Documentary film
1999	Taken	Sophia	Short film
2001	Lantana	Sonja Zat	Feature film
2004	One Perfect Day	Carolyn Matisse	Feature film
2004	Oyster Farmer	Trish	Feature film
2004	A Hard Place	(voice)	Short film
2005	Virus	Lillium Doubleheart	Short film
2005	Mind the Gap	Olivia Keeley	Short film
2006	Wobbegong	Paula / Mum	Short film
2006	Car Pool	Mrs. London	Short film
2007	Razzle Dazzle	Justine Morgan	Feature film
2008	Reservations	Hellen	Feature film US
2011	The Forgotten Men	Mother	Short film
2015	Pawno	Jennifer Montgomery	Feature film
2017	2:22	Catherine	Feature film US
2019	Two Heads Creek	Mary Pierce	Feature film
2020	The Very Excellent Mr. Dundee	Ella	Feature film
2024	Nugget is Dead: A Christmas Story	Tammy	Feature film
2026	Our Effed Up World	Grace	Feature film

=== Television ===
Year	Title	Role	Notes
1974	Marion	Elizabeth Andrews	Miniseries, 4 episodes
1976	The Sullivans	Winni	
1978, 1979	Cop Shop	Marlene Anderson / Angela Clark	2 episodes (guest roles)
1979	Prisoner	Lynn Warner	Season 1, 44 episodes (regular role)
1979	The Franky Doyle Story	Lynn Warner	TV film
1980	Skyways	Angela Murray	49 episodes (regular role)
1980	Water Under the Bridge	Dora	Miniseries, episode: "1.8"
1980	Cornflakes for Tea	Cheryl	TV film
1981	Together Tonight	Co-host	
1984	The Edge of Night	Tess McAdams	24 episodes
1984	Tales from the Darkside	Elaine Anderson Hall	Episode: "Slippage"
1984	Murder, She Wrote	Irina Katsa	Episode: "Death Takes a Curtain Call"
1985–1986	Dynasty	Elena, Duchess of Branagh	7 episodes (recurring role)
1988	Australians: Mary McKillop	Matron	Miniseries, 1 episode
1988	Barlow and Chambers: A Long Way from Home (aka Dadah Is Death)	Shawn Burton	Miniseries; 2 episodes
1989	American Playhouse	Eve Lummis	1 episode
1989–1991	Police Rescue	Des McClintock	Recurring role
1990	Come In Spinner	Deb Forrest	Miniseries, 2 episodes
1993	All Together Now	Beth Sumner	17 episodes (regular role)
1993–1994	Halfway Across the Galaxy and Turn Left	Officer Jady	13 episodes (regular role)
1994	High Tide	Valerie	Episode: "Beauty's Only Skin Deep"
1994–1995	Ocean Girl	Dr. Dianne Bates	Season 1–2, 26 episodes (lead role)
1995	Blue Heelers	Sandy Fielding	Episode: "Shadow Man"
1996	Halifax f.p.	Fiona Holmes	Episode: "Sweet Dreams"
1997	Heart Of Fire	Sue Tucker	TV film US
1997	20,000 Leagues Under the Sea	Lydia Rawlings	Miniseries, 2 episodes
1998–2000; 2019	SeaChange	Heather Jelly	Seasons 1–4 (regular role)
2000	Eugénie Sandler P.I.	Sylvia	Episode: "1.4"
2002	Lost In Oz	Alex's Mother (uncredited)	TV film US
2002–2003	MDA	Dr. Louella 'Ella' Davis	Lead role
2008–2011	Bed of Roses	Louisa Atherton	Seasons 1–3 (lead role)
2016–2017	The Wrong Girl	Mimi Woodward	Lead role
2018–2020	Neighbours	Heather Schilling / Alice Wells	Recurring role
2019–2021	Frayed	Jean Cooper	Seasons 1–2, 12 episodes (support role)
2020–2022	Grey Nomads	Ella Rouche	Web series, 12 episodes
2021	Spreadsheet	Carol	4 episodes
2022	Joe vs. Carole	Congresswoman Vivian Ross	Miniseries, 1 episode
2022	Darby and Joan	Summer	Miniseries, 2 episodes
2022	The Queen and Us	Narrator	TV special UK
2023	The Banskia House Breakout	Narrator	
2025	Strife	Margaret	2 episodes: "Whoman", "Moving On, Getting Over"
2026	Dear Life	Michelle Vandenburg	5 episodes

=== Other appearances ===
Year	Title	Role	Notes
1998	This Is Your Life	Self	1 episode
2003	Australian Story	Self	1 episode
2006	Dancing with the Stars	Contestant	Season 5, 5 episodes
2007	9am with David & Kim	Guest host	1 episode
2007–2010	20 to One	Self	10 episodes
2018	Show Me the Movie!	Self	1 episode
2018	I'm a Celebrity...Get Me Out of Here	Contestant	Season 4
2022	This Is Your Life: Rebecca Gibney	Self	1 episode
2022	ABC 90 Celebrate!	Self	TV special
2023	Who Do You Think You Are?	Self	1 episode

=== As producer ===
Year	Title	Role	Notes
TBA	MagicLands	Associate Producer	In development

== Theatre ==
=== As actor ===
Year	Title	Role	Notes	Ref.
1975	The Mating Season		Her Majesty's Theatre, Sydney with J. C. Williamson's	
1977	Doctor in Love	Kitten	Australian tour with J. C. Williamson's	
1981	Romeo and Juliet	Juliet	Long Wharf Theatre New Haven, Connecticut with Playwrights Foundation	
1981	Hamlet	Ophelia	Arena Stage, Washington DC with Playwrights Foundation	
1981	Measure for Measure	Isabella	Arena Stage, Washington DC with Playwrights Foundation	
1987	Dalliance	Christine	Long Wharf Theatre, New Haven, Connecticut	
1988	Waves of Change	Voice Over Artist	Castlemaine Swimming Pool with Handspan Theatre	
1991	Talley's Folly	Sally Talley	Fairfax Studio, Melbourne	
1992	The Idiot	Yepanchin / Varya Ivolgin / Radomsky	Theatre Works, Melbourne	
1993	I'm Not Rappaport	Clara	Playhouse, Melbourne with MTC	
1994	Song of Songs		Melbourne Athenaeum with Theatre Works	
2001	Away		Octagon Theatre, Perth with Black Swan State Theatre Company	
2005	Love Letters	Melissa Gardner	NIDA Parade Theatre, Sydney	
2005	Radio Holiday		Big hART / 10 Days on the Island	
2006	Stickybricks		Northcott Public Housing Estate, Sydney with Big hART	
2007	Drive in Holiday		Tasmanian tour with Big hART	
2007	The Glass Soldier	Maddy	Playhouse, Melbourne with MTC	
2007	Brave Men Run in Our Family		Her Majesty's Theatre, Melbourne	
2015	Blue Angel		Astor Hotel, Hobart with Big hART	
2024	Into the Shimmering World	Floss	Wharf Theatre, Sydney with STC	

=== As director/producer ===
Year	Title	Role	Notes	Ref.
2002	Knot @ Home	Producer	RMIT University, Melbourne, Capitol Theatre, Melbourne, Sydney Opera House with Big hART	
2007	Brave Men Run	Director	TML Enterprises	
2013	The Woolgatherer	Director	La Mama, Melbourne	
