= Bed of Roses (TV series) =

Australian comedy drama television series

- Intertitle for Bed of Roses
- Genre: Drama, Comedy
- Created by: Jutta Goetze; Elizabeth Coleman
- Developed by: ABC Drama Department
- Starring: Kerry Armstrong; Julia Blake; Hanna Mangan-Lawrence
- Theme music composer: Ross Wilson; Eris O'Brien; John Pullicino
- Composer: Niko Schäuble
- Country of origin: Australia
- Original language: English
- No. of seasons: 3
- No. of episodes: 26 (list of episodes)

Production
- Executive producers: Miranda Dear; Amanda Higgs
- Producers: Mark Ruse; Stephen Luby
- Production locations: South Gippsland, Australia
- Editor: Steven Robinson
- Running time: 50 min
- Production company: Southern Star Entertainment

Original release
- Network: ABC1
- Release: 10 May 2008 – 26 February 2011

Related
- SeaChange

Bed of Roses is an Australian comedy drama television series which was first shown on the Australian Broadcasting Corporation (ABC) from 10 May 2008. It stars Kerry Armstrong (SeaChange and Lantana) and was created by Jutta Goetze and Elizabeth Coleman. It was produced by Mark Ruse (Kath & Kim, The Games) and Stephen Luby (Crackerjack).

== Plot ==
Bed of Roses is about Louisa Atherton (Armstrong) handling her life after she discovers that her husband has died in the arms of another woman, leaving her broke. She returns to her home town of Rainbow's End to live with her feisty mother, Minna (Julia Blake). Rainbow's End is in a "growth corridor" with the neighbouring town of Indigo. Besides problems with Minna, Louisa encounters trouble with her teenage daughter Holly (Hanna Mangan-Lawrence) and local residents. Louisa has few financial assets except "Mary Kelly's Shack" which she inherited from her father. She decides to demolish the shack and build a new house to sell. Holly has taken the death of her father very hard and insists on carrying around his ashes. Louisa's irresponsible driving results in numerous traffic offences, which she can ill afford.

== Production ==
The first season contained six 50-minute episodes, with the $5 million production being shot over nine weeks, mostly in the South Gippsland towns of Foster and Meeniyan, it took six years from its initial conception to final screening. It has distinct overtones of Armstrong's previous ABC-TV series SeaChange. Bed of Roses was commissioned for a six-episode season and aired on Saturday night on ABC at 7:30 pm, leading into The Bill at 8:30 pm.

The ABC ordered 8 episodes for season two. Bud Tingwell and Philip Quast joined the cast for the second season. Season two of Bed of Roses was filmed over five months in regional Victoria (South Gippsland), Melbourne and in the ABC TV studios, Ripponlea.

"We knew whilst making series one that we had something special on our hands and so went straight into developing a second series. The audience response was terrific both on ABC1 and Podcast."

The head of ABC TV drama, Miranda Dear, on announcing season two of the hit drama, said, "Season Two of Bed of Roses is the story of a woman's search – and a community's search – for a workable identity in the 21st Century. It is also a love story. Because whether you're 80, 50 or 17, none of us is immune to that totally infuriating, confusing, heating, frighteningly vulnerable sensation that renders us smiling, crying, despairing, and hopeful, all in the same breath. Particularly when you're not sure which man you're in love with."

Season three, the final season, began filming in May 2010, and was filmed over five months in regional Victoria (South Gippsland), Melbourne and in the ABC TV studios, Southbank. For the second time the number of episodes increased, with season 3 having 12 episodes. It began airing on 4 December 2010.

== Cast ==
=== Main cast ===
- Kerry Armstrong as Louisa Atherton, recently widowed, returns to Rainbow's End.
  - Becomes editor of The Rainbow Echo, responds to community issues, problems with Tim and Nick.
- Julia Blake as Minna Franklin, Louisa's mother, member of the Heritage Society.
  - Renews friendship with Sandy, fights redevelopments.
- Caroline Gillmer as Marg Braithwaite, estranged wife of Gavin Braithwaite.
  - Now a marriage celebrant, tries to gain Tim's interest.
- Hanna Mangan-Lawrence as Holly Atherton, Louisa's daughter, Indigo High year 11 student, works at Lim's.
  - Now in year 12, becomes involved in local issues, misunderstanding with Sean.
- Jay Laga'aia as Nick Pickering, Louisa's old friend who runs Nick's Tyre Service.
  - Goes out with Louisa, helps Holly with driving lessons.
- Andrew S. Gilbert as Gavin Braithwaite, hardware store owner, local councillor.
  - Continues self-promotion, buys The Rainbow Echo, appoints Tim as manager.
- Kaarin Fairfax as Deb Mathieson, new friend, worked on The Rainbow Echo, looks after injured wildlife.
  - Runs a wildlife sanctuary, because of conflicting work hours sees less of husband Trev.
- Tim Phillipps as Sean Smithwick, local footballer, undertaker's son, has a crush on Holly.
  - Misunderstanding with Holly, drives undertaker's van.
- Dina Panozzo as Gemma O'Reilly, gym owner, old friend.
  - Intimacy problems with husband Pat.
- HaiHa Le as Rita Lim, Rainbow Inn restaurant & Happy Nuggett mini-market manager, Gavin's girlfriend.
  - Involved in community projects, new boyfriend is Chin.

==== Season 2 ====
- Charles 'Bud' Tingwell as Sandy Wilsoncroft, Minna's old friend, has Alzheimer's disease.
- Gareth Yuen as Chin Tsung Chi, trying to find an ancestor, Rita's new boyfriend.
- Philip Quast as Tim Price, new manager of The Rainbow Echo, Louisa's boss.

==== Season 3 ====
- Matt Levett as Sean Smithwick

=== Additional cast ===
- Dave Thornton as Shannon Atherton, Louisa's 24-year-old son, plays Aussie Rules football professionally.
- Cameron McKenzie as 'Young Cop' (Gregg Russell), books Louisa for traffic offences, returns run-away Holly.
  - Books Sean for driving while intoxicated – ticket withdrawn by Sergeant.
- Kallista Kaval as Wendy Watt, The Rainbow Echo editor, Louisa's boss.
  - Leaves newspaper for a better offer.
- Richard Davies as 'Rooster' McIver, football team captain, makes an advance on Holly, Marty's 'chippie'.
- Greg Stone as Jack (Thomas) Atherton (1956–2008), Louisa's husband, dies of a heart attack.
- Jacquie Brennan as Anna Mayhew, Jack's girlfriend.
- Amanda Ma as Lily Lim, Rita's mother, Rainbow Inn restaurant & Happy Nuggett mini-market co-owner, disapproves of Gavin.
- Lawrence Mah as Wayne Lim, Rita's father, business co-owner, friendly with Gavin, proposes expanding shopping centre.
- Frank Magree as Marty Mason, a builder, Rainbow Roos' coach.
  - Also a taxi driver, continues building projects for Gavin.
- Brandon Burns as Macca, footballer, Marty's labourer, turns 21.
- Susie Dee as Vivien Dixon, Minna's friend, member of the Heritage Society.
  - Works at The Rainbow Echo, runs 'Caring Caroline' column.
- Geoff Morrell as Tibor Havel, a psychiatrist, Louisa's widowed neighbour.
- Leverne McDonnell as Robyn (Blake), Louisa's friend in Melbourne, offers her a job.
- Ronald Boyter as Clem Blackwell, Rainbow's End resident.
  - Cliff Ellen as Clem.
- Tim Sullivan as Ern Swann, real estate agent.
- Nicole Gulasekharam as Tahlia, Holly's school friend.
  - Protests, with other students, against redevelopments with Holly.
- Graham Thwaites as Jase, Marty's roofing sub-contractor and nephew.
- Julie Wynn as Meilin (Chee), ghost seen by Louisa, previous owner of the shack.
- Greg Stone as Jack Atherton (1 episode)

==== Season 2 ====
- Jasper Bagg as Trev Mathieson, truck driver, work hours conflict with Deb's wildlife work.
- Christopher Bunworth as Pat O'Reilly, intimacy problem with Gemma.
- Richard Moss as Bob Stinson, previous Rainbow Echo owner.
- Christopher Connelly as Lionel Smithwick, undertaker, Sean's father.
- Terry Gill as Owen Diston, goat farmer.

==== Season 3 ====
- Georgia Chara as Bike Salesperson (1 episode)
- Laura Gordon as Donna (1 episode)
- Todd MacDonald as Conrad (1 episode)

== Episodes ==
Season	Episodes	Originally released	
Season	Episodes	First released	Last released
1	6	10 May 2008	14 June 2008
2	8	13 February 2010	4 March 2010
3	12	4 December 2010	26 February 2011

== International broadcasts ==
Bed of Roses was screened in South Africa on pay television operator DStv on the Series Channel. The second season premiered in South Africa more than two months before the Australian premiere, on 24 November 2009.

The show also aired in Ireland on RTÉ One and is available in the US via the Acorn.com subscription service.

The series premiered in the UK for the first time as part of Amazon Prime Video on 17 April 2019.

== Reception ==
=== Critical reception ===
- The Sydney Morning Herald reviewer, Judy Adamson, praised the characterisation of Bed of Roses for episode 1. Jodie Pfarr found that despite a slow start, the series had improved by episode 3 with Armstrong showing mastery of a range of emotions. Kate Duthie felt the series was too cliche-ridden by episode 4.
- The Age reviewer, Catherine Deveny, was disappointed that the talented cast delivered a painful performance.
- In a favourable review from David Knox of TV Tonight, he praised the premise, the writing and the strong performance from Kerry Armstrong. He commented that "this is a warm-spirited, genial tale full of quiet charm and likable characters. When other television dramas are full of murder, sex, conceited characters or consciously seeking to blur genre lines, here is a story that isn't anywhere near as ambitious. And it's a blessing."

=== Ratings ===
Season	Timeslot (Australian)	Ep	First aired		Last aired		Rank	Avg. viewers (millions)
Season	Timeslot (Australian)	Ep	Date	Viewers (millions)	Date	Viewers (millions)	Rank	Avg. viewers (millions)
1	Saturday 7:30 pm	6	10 May 2008	1.07	14 June 2008	0.961	5	0.972
2	Saturday 7:30 pm	8	13 February 2010	0.675	3 April 2010	0.651	9	0.621
3	Saturday 7:30 pm	12	4 December 2010	0.767	26 February 2011	0.689	7	0.652

=== Awards and nominations ===
Bed of Roses has been nominated for two AFI Awards in 2008 – Best Telefeature, Mini Series or Short Run Series for the first season, and Best Guest or Supporting Actress in a Television Drama for Hanna Mangan-Lawrence's performance in the first season. Season one also received three nominations at the Logie Awards in 2009 – for Most Outstanding Drama Series, Miniseries or Movie, Most Outstanding Actress (Julia Blake), and Most Outstanding New Talent (Hanna Mangan-Lawrence).

== Home media ==
Series	Release date	Episodes	Discs	ACB Rating	Ref(s)
Series 1	7 August 2008	6	2	PG	
Series 2	1 April 2010	8	2	PG	
Series 3	3 March 2011	12	3	PG	
Series 1–3	3 April 2013	26	7	PG	

== See also ==
- List of Australian television series
- List of programs broadcast by ABC (Australian TV network)
