= Paper Planes (film) =

- Australian theatrical release poster
- Directed by: Robert Connolly
- Written by: Robert Connolly; Steve Worland
- Produced by: Robert Connolly; Maggie Miles; Liz Kearney
- Starring: Sam Worthington; David Wenham; Ed Oxenbould; Deborah Mailman
- Cinematography: Tristan Milani
- Edited by: Nick Meyers
- Music by: Nigel Westlake
- Production companies: Screen Australia; Arenamedia
- Distributed by: Roadshow Films
- Release date: January 15, 2015
- Running time: 96 minutes
- Country: Australia
- Language: English
- Box office: AU$9.61 million

Paper Planes is a 2015 Australian children's drama film directed by Robert Connolly which he co-wrote with Steve Worland and produced with Maggie Miles and Liz Kearney. The film has both a live action and 3D version. It stars Sam Worthington, David Wenham, Deborah Mailman, and Ed Oxenbould. The film tells a story about Dylan, a young boy who lives in Australia, who finds out that he has a talent for making paper planes and dreams of competing in the World Paper Plane Championships in Japan.

It had a Kids-Gala screening at the Melbourne International Film Festival in 2014, opened the Generation K+ section of the Berlin International Film Festival and was the inaugural sinner of the CinefestOz film prize. The film opened in Australian cinemas on 15 January 2015 on 253 screens by Roadshow Films. It grossed A$9.61 million at the Australian box office by the end of its run. The story is loosely inspired by an episode of Australian Story called "Fly With Me". Paper Planes was released on DVD and Blu-ray on 24 June 2015 by Roadshow Entertainment.

== Cast ==
- Ed Oxenbould as Dylan Webber
- Sam Worthington as Jack Webber
- Ena Imai as Kimi Muroyama
- Nicholas Bakopoulos-Cooke as Jason Jones
- Julian Dennison as Kevin
- David Wenham as Patrick Jones
- Deborah Mailman as Maureen Prescott
- Peter Rowsthorn as Mr. Hickenlooper
- Terry Norris as George 'Grandpa' Webber
- Mark Mitchell as Mr White
- Lilli De Nardi as Paper Thrower #7

== Production ==
On 9 November 2013, filming had begun in Perth in Western Australia and in Tokyo with Robert Connolly directing. Sam Worthington, David Wenham, Julian Dennison, and Ed Oxenbould star in the film.

Principal photography took place in both country and metro Western Australia, though the film states the setting as being in New South Wales (given they "drive down to Sydney"). Locations used for filming include an abandoned school in Roleystone, an old house in Baldivis, Challenge Stadium, Whiteman Park, the Perth Zoo, and the Aviation Heritage Museum in Bull Creek. Fifteen students from Roleystone Community College were extras in the film.

== Release ==
Paper Planes was released in theatres throughout Australia on 15 January 2015, and on DVD and Blu-ray on 24 June 2015 by Roadshow Entertainment.

== Critical response and box office ==
This film holds an 85% approval rating on Rotten Tomatoes based on 27 reviews. By the end of its run, it had grossed A$9.61 million at the Australian box office.

Jim Schembri of 3AW wrote in his review, "In one of the great career gear shifts in recent memory, Melbourne director Robert Connolly, who gave us such searing dramas as The Bank, Three Dollars, and Balibo, delivers an adorable family film that is uplifting, warm, winning, and most of all, funny." Fiona Williams of sbs.com.au says, "there's a lot to like in Paper Planes' ideas about ingenuity and resilience, and that may bode well for getting bums off the beach and onto seats in the film's late summer school holiday release period."

While the film performed strongly at the box office domestically in Australia, it was less successful in its international debut (U.K./Ireland,) opening at number 47 and earning £4,381 in its opening weekend (23–25 October 2015.) The film was released in Spain on 1 January 2016 (the film's only European theatrical release as of February 2016) and opened at number 29 with a gross of US$7,577 from 21 screens, for a per-theatre average of $361.

=== Awards ===
Award	Category	Subject	Result
AACTA Awards (5th)	Best Film	Maggie Miles	Nominated
AACTA Awards (5th)	Best Film	Liz Kearney	Nominated
AACTA Awards (5th)	Best Film	Robert Connolly	Nominated
AACTA Awards (5th)	Best Original Screenplay	Robert Connolly	Won
AACTA Awards (5th)	Best Original Screenplay	Steve Worland	Won
AACTA Awards (5th)	Best Supporting Actress	Deborah Mailman	Nominated
AACTA Awards (5th)	Best Original Music Score	Nigel Westlake	Nominated
AACTA Awards (5th)	Best Sound	James Ashton	Nominated
AACTA Awards (5th)	Best Sound	Emma Bortignon	Nominated
AACTA Awards (5th)	Best Sound	Chris Goodes	Nominated
AACTA Awards (5th)	Best Sound	Trevor Hope	Nominated
AACTA Awards (5th)	People's Choice Award for Favourite Australian Film	Maggie Miles	Nominated
AACTA Awards (5th)	People's Choice Award for Favourite Australian Film	Liz Kearney	Nominated
AACTA Awards (5th)	People's Choice Award for Favourite Australian Film	Robert Connolly	Nominated
Australian Directors Guild Award	Best Direction in a Feature Film	Robert Connolly	Nominated
AWGIE Award	Best Writing in a Feature Film - Original	Robert Connolly	Nominated
AWGIE Award	Best Writing in a Feature Film - Original	Steve Worland	Nominated
ASE Award	Best Editing in a Feature Film	Nick Meyers	Nominated
Berlin International Film Festival	Generation Kplus - Crystal Bear for Best Film	Robert Connolly	Nominated
Jerusalem Film Festival	Young Critics Club Award for Best Children's Film	Robert Connolly	Won
Seattle International Film Festival	Youth Jury Award	Robert Connolly	Nominated

== Soundtrack ==
- "Paper Planes"
- "Beauty in the World"
- "Ready to Launch"
- "Flight Research"
- "My Journey Starts Here"
- "Dog Fight"
- "A Bird That Cannot Fly"
- "Pavane"
- "Take Your Positions"
- "Do Emus Dream of Flying?"
- "The Final Challenge"
- "Is There a Movie on This Flight?"
- "Tokyo by Night"
- "The Competition"
- "For as Long as it Takes"
- "Learn to Live" - Lior
- "Bow River" – Cold Chisel

== Book ==
Steve Worland, who co-wrote Paper Planes, novelised the screenplay into a best-selling book for young readers. It was published on 2 January 2015 through Puffin Books. It includes directions on how to fold a paper plane, photographs from the film, and notes about the production.
