= The Farm (Australian TV series) =

2001 British Australian miniseries

- Written by: Judith Colquhoun; David Phillips
- Directed by: Kate Woods
- Starring: Colin Friels; Greta Scacchi
- Country of origin: Australia
- Original language: English

Production
- Producer: Bill Hughes
- Cinematography: Joseph Pickering
- Editor: Christopher Spurr
- Running time: 161 minutes

Original release
- Network: ABC
- Release: 18 March – 25 March 2001

The Farm is a 2001 Australian TV mini series broadcast on the ABC. The three part drama series starred Colin Friels and Greta Scacchi.

== Plot ==
The bank convinces farmer Tom Cooper to take out a foreign currency loan. After conditions change and he is no longer able to repay the loan he takes on the bank over their bad financial advice.

== Cast ==
- Colin Friels as Tom Cooper
- Greta Scacchi as Liz Cooper
- Marton Csokas as Adrian Beckett
- Simon Chilvers as Phil Reynolds
- Melissa Jaffer as Helen Cooper
- Jamie Croft as (Young) Fred Cooper
- Yael Stone as (Young) Sam Cooper
- Ned Manning as Eddie McCormick
- Kris McQuade as Pat McCormick
- Mark Priestley as Johnno McCormick
- Wyn Roberts as George Cooper
- Tim McKenzie as Dan Reynolds
- Bille Brown as Booth
- Paul Chubb as Ron Oakes
- Kelly Butler as Felicity North
- Marshall Napier as Peter Collins
- Christopher Stollery as Walsh
- Rob Steele as Roy
- Craig Elliott as Wayne
- Jan Merriman as Rosemary
- Joe Manning as Fred Cooper
- Sibylla Budd as Sam Cooper
- Peter Carroll as Fenwick
- Helmut Bakaitis as Judge Wescott
- Tim Richards as Danny

== Reception ==
Writing in the Australian Tim Hughes gave the series a positive review, praising the lead actors and saying "It's essential viewing for anyone with a sense of justice and a sense of place." Brian Courtis of The Age gave it 4 stars and wrote "[Director Kate] Woods and writers Judith Colquhoun and David Phillips allow their heroes to endure without treading too many well-worn, dusty tracks. " Also in The Age Debi Enker wrote "The Farm is a perceptive snapshot of a period in recent history, a tribute to a fierce spirit and an examination of the ties that bind."

== Awards ==
- 2001 AFI Awards
  - Best Performance by an Actress in a Telefeature or Mini Series - Greta Scacchi - nominated
