= The Bet (2006 film) =

- Directed by: Mark Lee
- Written by: Caroline Gerard
- Starring: Aden Young; Matthew Newton
- Cinematography: Hugh Miller
- Edited by: Jason Ballantine
- Music by: John Gray
- Production company: Gerrycan Productions
- Distributed by: Madman Entertainment
- Release date: 4 March 2006 (London Australian Film Festival)
- Running time: 1h 32m
- Country: Australia
- Language: English
- Box office: A$25,032 (Australia)

The Bet is a 2006 Australian film directed by Mark Lee.

== Plot ==
The film is a story about a man named Will (Matthew Newton), a young stockbroker, who makes a bet with his wealthy friend Angus (Aden Young) to prove himself and to prove who can make the most money with 50 grand in 90 days for a prize of 200 grand. Their mutual friend Benno, Will's boss tells to invest in a pharmaceutical company. In desperation he agrees to bend for a bit for insider trading. His ego-fueled obsession on the betting game forces him to measure the cost of his ambition against the true value of love. Stock prices hit low and his clients are devastated. His father also invested money with Will and lost it. Will finds out through Benno (Tim Richards) that his girlfriend Tory (Sibylla Budd) is working with the pharmaceutical company, Will finds a note at Tory's office and finds out a way he can make back his lost money. Unfortunately, he doesn't find any investors. Will asks office assistant, Trish (Alyssa McClelland), whom he has jilted earlier to transfer funds from one of his clients illegally and he uses it to gain profit. Will puts back the money he transferred illegally but is arrested for fraud by officials. Tory who gets him out confronts his betting obsession, tells the pharmaceutical company he was betting against was Angus's family business and he controls it. Will makes the connection between Benno's advice and Angus' bet. Will confronts Angus and he says it's he who recommended Trish in their company through Benno, and Benno was bribed handsomely to reel in Will. This was because Tory was Angus' girlfriend first and he still pines over her. Angus is beaten up by Will but Angus manages to pins down Will and asserts he will charge case against Will using Trish as a witness for fraud, market manipulation, insider trading...etc. enough to put Will for a long jail-time which will make Tory forget him. Betrayed and humiliated Will commits suicide. After Will's funeral Trish tells Tory about Angus' role in Will's suicide.

The Bet is a morality tale, set in the city of Sydney, about choosing friends, boundaries and betrayals, relevance and consequences of proto-self, the perils of fallacy and the value of love and life.

== Cast ==
- Matthew Newton as Will
- Sibylla Budd as Tory
- Aden Young as Angus
- Tim Richards as Benno
- Roy Billing as George
- Alyssa McClelland as Trish
- Peta Sergeant as Lila
- Noel Hodda as Brian

== Production ==
The Bet is set in western Sydney.

The score was written by John Gray.

== Release ==
The film premiered on 4 March 2006 at the London Australian Film Festival and released in Australian cinemas September 2007.

== Awards and nominations ==
The Bet won the Jury Grand Prix, Best feature film, at the Antipodean Film Festival in Saint-Tropez, France, in 2008.

Sibylla Budd was nominated for Best Supporting Actress in the 2007 Australian Film Institute Awards.

John Gray won Best Original Song Composed for the Screen at the 2007 edition of the APRA/AGSC Australian Screen Music Awards.

== See also ==
- Cinema of Australia
