= Andrew Plain =

Australian sound designer and supervising sound editor

- Born: Andrew Keith Plain; 26 July 1953; Melbourne, Victoria, Australia
- Died: 13 December 2013 (aged 60); Sydney, New South Wales, Australia
- Occupations: Sound designer and editor

Andrew Keith Plain (26 July 1953 – 13 December 2013) was an Australian sound designer and supervising sound editor. Through his company, Huzzah Sound, he created the soundtracks for many Australian and international films and television series including Alex Proyas's Knowing; Phillip Noyce's Catch A Fire; Jane Campion's In the Cut; Gillian Armstrong's Death Defying Acts, Charlotte Gray and Oscar and Lucinda; Ray Lawrence's Lantana and Jindabyne; Neil Armfield's Candy; Peter Duncan's Unfinished Sky and Children of the Revolution, Sarah Watt's Look Both Ways, Richard James Allen's Thursday's Fictions; Rolf De Heer's Alexandra's Project, John Curran's Praise, and Dein Perry's Bootman.

Huzzah's work was awarded nine Australian Film Institute (AFI) nominations including three Awards for Best Sound, an Inside Film (IF), and for Best Sound Design. he also got a Golden Reel (Motion Pictures Sound Editors - America) nomination.

Plain died on 13 December 2013 from melanoma.
