= The Secret Life of Us season 1 =

The Secret Life of Us
- Season 1
- DVD cover art
- No. of episodes: 22

Release
- Original network: Ten
- Original release: 16 July – 26 November 2001

The first season of the television drama series The Secret Life of Us aired from 16 July to 26 November 2001 on Network Ten in Australia. The series traces the often tumultuous life of a group of friends in their mid-twenties who live in a St Kilda apartment building.

== Production ==
After airing the telemovie and subsequently receiving a great reception, Ten took a multimillion-dollar gamble and commissioned The Secret Life of Us to a series. Another gamble the network took was airing the series at 9:30pm, due partly to stop the breaching of censorship laws. Of the timeslot, Herald Sun journalist, Robert Fidgeon wrote, "Not that The Secret Life of Us is a tits-and-bums, obscenity-filled raunchfest. It is a quality series about the relationships of a group of twentysomethings. As such, it deserves to succeed. It is far and away the most accurate, honest and intelligent Australian drama series ever pitched at younger viewers."

== Plot ==
The series traces the often tumultuous life of a group of friends in their mid-twenties who live in a St Kilda apartment building and are all looking for the same thing – love, sex, romance and success. The problem is they haven't worked out how to get it yet – so they make it up as they go along. Exploring sympathetic themes and establishing a recognised trifecta of homelife, lovelife and worklife, their experiences become a salient reminder that despite the struggle, juggle and balance of these things – friendship is what matters. Alex Christensen is an ambitious doctor who is riddled with insecurities and shares a flat with would-be-writer Evan Wylde who is in need of motivation and Kelly Lewis, a vivacious real estate agent who quits her job because of the affair she was having with her boss. Miranda Lang has her sighs set on stardom and together with her actor boyfriend Richie Blake, they share a flat with the no-nonsense Will McGill. Simon Trader works as a bartender at the local pub and is a source of wisdom and love. Jason Kennedy and Gabrielle Kovitch are about to get married for the wrong reasons – who will be the first to realise their mistake?

== Cast ==
=== Main ===
- Claudia Karvan as Alex Christensen
- Deborah Mailman as Kelly Lewis
- Samuel Johnson as Evan Wylde
- Abi Tucker as Miranda Lang
- Joel Edgerton as Will McGill
- Spencer McLaren as Richie Blake
- Sibylla Budd as Gabrielle Kovitch
- Damian De Montemas as Jason Kennedy
- David Tredinnick as Simon Trader

=== Recurring ===
- Jessica Gower as Sam (15 episodes)
- Benjamin McNair as Joseph (5 episodes)
- Tasma Walton as Leah (5 episodes)
- Oscar Redding as Eric (8 episodes)
- Catherine McClements as Carmen (9 episodes)

=== Guest ===
- Leverne McDonnell as Kelly's Boss (6 episodes)
- Todd MacDonald as Nathan Leiberman (4 episodes)
- Damian Walshe-Howling as Mac (7 episodes)
- Steve Mouzakis as Paolo (5 episodes)
- Kenneth Ransom as Brad (6 episodes)

== Episodes ==
| No. overall | No. in season | Title | Directed by | Written by | Original release date |
|---|---|---|---|---|---|
| 1 | 1 | "Telemovie – Part 1" | Lynn-Maree Danzey | Christopher Lee & Judi McCrossin | 16 July 2001 |
Meet Miranda, Richie, Will, Alex, Evan, Kelly, Jason and Gabrielle – flatmates, friends, lovers – they are all searching for life's often elusive treasures – a fulfillment of love, sex, money and success. Their shared experience in a St. Kilda apartment building begins a journey of discovery, deception, and delight.
| 2 | 2 | "Telemovie – Part 2" | Lynn-Maree Danzey | Christopher Lee & Judi McCrossin | 16 July 2001 |
Evan embarks on writing his first novel, despite the reoccurring presence of his one-night stand, Andrena. Kelly throws a housewarming party and coerces the pay that was owed to her from her boss. Gabrielle and Jason have a shotgun wedding as he tries to cover up the fact that he had sex with Alex. Miranda gets the role of Ophelia in Hamlet, which causes a rift between her and Richie. Will's manipulative ex-girlfriend, Leah, turns up and asks for $12,000. Kelly meets a potential boyfriend at 3am.
| 3 | 3 | "The Unbelievable Truth" | Daniel Nettheim | Judi McCrossin | 23 July 2001 |
Alex makes a huge mistake by sleeping with Vincent, the man who will decide whether she will join the surgery program or not. Kelly goes on a date with Joseph but wonders whether he is the right guy or not. Evan meets a young mother, Carmen, with two children and tells Kelly and Alex that he would kill a pet for $1,000. Gabrielle and Jason are at each other's throats while Gabrielle tries to forgive Alex. Richie begins his new acting job. Kelly starts a new job at a high-end dating agency.
| 4 | 4 | "The Garden of Gethsemane" | Daniel Nettheim | Judi McCrossin | 30 July 2001 |
Kelly breaks her fourth-date rule and sleeps with Joseph on the third date, then worries when he doesn't kiss her goodnight. Will has trouble letting go of Leah and it isn't until he receives a cheque from her that he realises he's better off without her. Evan goes on a date with Carmen and after a relatively poor night, they agree to go on a second date. Alex grows jealous when she discovers that Eric is doing more complex surgeries than she is, and wonders whether it's because she's a female.
| 5 | 5 | "The Rules" | Cate Shortland | Christopher Lee | 6 August 2001 |
Evan is besotted by Carmen and his realisation of his real feelings have him freaking out. Will suffers from performance anxiety when attempting to have sex with Sam. Kelly's new job doesn't go quite to plan when she tries to take the advice she gives clients and use it in her relationship with Joseph. Gabrielle and Jason reconcile. Richie and Miranda grow distant and when he consoles his gay friend Simon, Richie becomes uncomfortable when Simon suggests he is flirting. Jason tries to get in contact with Alex.
| 6 | 6 | "Expect The Unexpected" | Cate Shortland | Judi McCrossin | 13 August 2001 |
| 7 | 7 | "The Road Less Taken" | Stuart McDonald | Judi McCrossin | 20 August 2001 |
| 8 | 8 | "What Am I?" | Stuart McDonald | Christopher Lee | 27 August 2001 |
| 9 | 9 | "The Secret Life of Us" | Richard Jasek | Judi McCrossin | 3 September 2001 |
| 10 | 10 | "State of Limbo" | Kate Dennis | Judi McCrossin & David Ogilvy | 3 September 2001 |
| 11 | 11 | "Love Sucks" | Kate Dennis | Christopher Lee | 10 September 2001 |
| 12 | 12 | "Fallout" | Daniel Nettheim | Judi McCrossin | 17 September 2001 |
| 13 | 13 | "Secrets and Lies" | Stuart McDonald | Jessica Adams & Judi McCrossin | 24 September 2001 |
| 14 | 14 | "Better the Devil You Know" | Stuart McDonald | Elizabeth Coleman | 1 October 2001 |
| 15 | 15 | "The Gap" | Daniel Nettheim | Tony McNamara | 8 October 2001 |
| 16 | 16 | "The Butterfly Effect" | Roger Hodgman | Andrew Kelly | 15 October 2001 |
| 17 | 17 | "Piggy-in-the-Middle" | Roger Hodgman | Elizabeth Coleman | 22 October 2001 |
| 18 | 18 | "Intimations of Mortality" | Richard Jasek | Christopher Lee | 29 October 2001 |
| 19 | 19 | "A Friend Indeed" | Cate Shortland | Tony McNamara | 5 November 2001 |
| 20 | 20 | "Men on the Verge" | Cate Shortland | Roger Monk | 12 November 2001 |
| 21 | 21 | "Doorway" | Declan Eames | Christopher Lee | 19 November 2001 |
| 22 | 22 | "Now or Never" | Declan Eames | Judi McCrossin | 26 November 2001 |

== DVD release ==
- The Secret Life of Us vol 1 consisting of episodes 1–3 (the telemovie plus episode 3: The Unbelievable Truth) was released in Australia in 2001 as a single DVD by Kaleidoscope Film, a division of Shock Music Group, cat. KAL0020.

The Secret Life of Us – The Complete First Series
| Set details | Special features | |
| 22 episodes; 6-disc set; 1.77:1 aspect ratio; English (Dolby Digital 5.1); M (recommended for mature audiences: medium level violence, low level coarse language, low level sex scenes, sexual references, nudity, adult themes and drug use) | Behind the Scenes | |
Release Dates
| Region 1 | Region 2 | Region 4 |
| — | 11 June 2003 | 12 June 2012 |
