= List of Bed of Roses episodes =

Australian television comedy drama series

Bed of Roses is an Australian television comedy drama series which premiered on the Australian Broadcasting Corporation (ABC) on 10 May 2008. It lasted three seasons, consisting of 26 episodes in total, concluding on 26 February 2011. The series broadcast on Saturday nights at 7:30 pm throughout its run.

The following is a list of episodes

== Series overview ==
Season	Episodes	Originally released	
Season	Episodes	First released	Last released
1	6	10 May 2008	14 June 2008
2	8	13 February 2010	3 April 2010
3	12	4 December 2010	26 February 2011

== Season 1 (2008) ==
No. overall	No. in season	Title	Directed by	Written by	Original release date	Aus. viewers
1	1	"Not Worth a Cent"	Paul Moloney	Jutta Goetze & Elizabeth Coleman	10 May 2008	1.07
Louisa's husband Jack Atherton suffers a heart attack and dies, leaving massive debts and a mobile phone containing photos of him hugging another woman. Holly is unable to part with her father's ashes. Louisa returns to Minna's home in Rainbow's End with Holly, hoping to sell "Mary Kelly's Shack". Minna is against the sale as the shack was owned by Louisa's father, after some indecision Louisa resolves to live in the shack. Holly meets local man Sean Smithwick.
2	2	"Reality Check"	Paul Moloney	Jutta Geotze & Elizabeth Coleman	17 May 2008	0.955
Louisa gets work: cleaning Gavin Braithwaite's house but is fired, The Rainbow Echo newspaper photographer and Golf Club cleaner. Holly finds a waitress job at the Rainbow Inn restaurant, meets Rainbow Roos footballers including 'Rooster' McIver who makes an advance on her, Holly runs away back to Melbourne. "Mary Kelly's Shack" is due to be demolished by local builder Marty Mason but Louisa's mother arrives with a council order having the site heritage listed.
3	3	"Things Can Only Get Better"	Paul Moloney	Jutta Geotze & Elizabeth Coleman	24 May 2008	0.970
Marty begins to renovate the shack, but delays occur and expenses mount. Shannon is in financial and professional trouble so he turns to Louisa. Louisa builds her friendship with Marg and Deb, while Holly becomes friends with Rita Lim and Sean. Minna objects to Wayne Lim (business owner) and Gavin's shopping centre expansion. Rainbow Roos finally win a game using Shannon's advice and Sean's effort. Louisa meets Tibor her neighbour who collects his pony.
4	4	"A Friend in Need"	Mandy Smith	Jutta Geotze & Elizabeth Coleman	31 May 2008	1.02
Marty's work is shonky but Louisa refuses to fire him despite Holly's urgings. Minna loses her licence due to failing eyesight. Louisa learns "Mary Kelly" was Meilin Chee living in 1858 and Hector Kelly's widow. Louisa becomes friends with Tibor, while Holly is able to release her father's ashes. Marg and Gavin conflict over their divorce. Deb brings an orphaned wombat to work and is fired. When the roof is blown off Louisa sacks Marty and her friends rally to restore it.
5	5	"The Truth Will Set You Free"	Mandy Smith	Jutta Goetze & Elizabeth Coleman	7 June 2008	0.854
Louisa is exhausted from working two jobs and at the shack, Holly's crush on Sean deepens and they kiss. Louisa offends her friend Nick, a rain storm destroys her plaster sheets and she considers selling the shack unfinished. After Holly sees the mobile phone images of Anna, Louisa travels to Melbourne to meet Jack's lover and resolves some issues. Rainbow's End residents help renovate the shack, Louisa sees Meilin's ghost and decides to repatriate the bones to China.
6	6	"Over the Rainbow"	Mandy Smith	Jutta Goetze & Elizabeth Coleman	14 June 2008	0.961
Now about a year after Jack's death, Louisa is ready to move on, she's going to auction the shack and get a job in Melbourne. Minna has a fall and is hospitalised, Holly doesn't want to go back as she has close ties locally. At a Sorry Ceremony, Meilin Chee's bones are exhumed and handed over to Chinese authorities.

== Season 2 (2010) ==
No. overall	No. in season	Title	Directed by	Written by	Original release date	Aus. viewers
7	1	"The Cockatoo Has Landed"	Grant Brown	Elizabeth Coleman	13 February 2010	0.675
Louisa and Holly return to Rainbows End, with Louisa determined to make some significant changes in her life, only to see none of her plans go quite as she hoped.
8	2	"Rainbow Warriors"	Grant Brown	Jutta Goetz	20 February 2010	0.615
Minna learns that a local factory is polluting Rainbow's End's waterways. This prompts Holly to become embroiled in an environmental protest that rapidly goes further than she originally envisioned.
9	3	"The Front Page"	Grant Brown	Elizabeth Coleman	27 February 2010	0.492
Louisa and her new co-worker, Tim Price, agree to disagree about what the future holds for The Echo. Rita and Tsung Chi delve into the mystery of his ancestor Ah Chin, who disappeared during the Gold Rush.
10	4	"Gaa-aarth"	Darren Ashton	Jutta Goetz	6 March 2010	0.613
Deb's marriage with Trev is barely surviving, prompting Louisa, Marg and Gemma to try to save it. Minna watches on helplessly as the Heritage Committee finally seems to be falling apart.
11	5	"Goddess of the Rainbow"	Darren Ashton	Elizabeth Coleman	13 March 2010	0.578
Gemma's ongoing intimacy issues with Pat threaten their relationship. Vivien's role as the Echo's Caring Caroline causes chaos in the lives of those she genuinely cares about.
12	6	"Green Versus Gold"	Ted Emery	Jutta Goetz	20 March 2010	0.726
Rainbow's End is threatened by a large mining corporation and this could mean the end of the Community Garden. The police detain Minna and Sandy after suspicious substances are seized at his museum.
13	7	"Two Bulls in a Paddock"	Ted Emery	Elizabeth Coleman	27 March 2010	0.617
Nick and Tim continue to fight for Louisa's affections like two bulls in a paddock.
14	8	"Raucous Angels"	Ted Emery	Jutta Goetz	3 April 2010	0.651
With her career and personal life at a crossroads, Louisa has to make a very important decision.

== Season 3 (2010–2011) ==
No. overall	No. in season	Title	Directed by	Written by	Original release date	Aus. viewers
15	1	"5835 Plus One"	Ted Emery	Deborah Parsons	4 December 2010	0.767
Louisa is embarking on a new chapter of her life as co-owner and editor of the Rainbow's End Echo. She is in love with Nick and daughter Holly is planning to attend university in Melbourne. Everything seems perfect in Louisa's life until the bubble bursts. Months after Sandy's death Minna is gripped with a grief that threatens to sink her.
16	2	"Mind the Gap"	Ted Emery	Max Dann	11 December 2010	0.673
Louisa loses her engagement ring and worries to Marg and Deb that it is a bad omen.
17	3	"Womb to Tomb"	Ted Emery	Max Dann	18 December 2010	0.565
Louisa comes to the rescue when local woman Tamara Denning falls on hard times after her husband leaves her and their three young children.
18	4	"Laid Bare"	David Cameron	David Hannam	1 January 2011	0.714
Minna's secret plans to take up ballroom dancing again are hijacked when she confronts a burglar in her home.
19	5	"Cat Fight"	David Cameron	Yasbelle Dean	8 January 2011	0.681
When Domestic Cat Regulations come to a head in Rainbow's End, Louisa finds her two closest friends, Deb and Marg, fall on opposite sides of the argument.
20	6	"Fryberg's Frolly"	David Cameron	Josephine Dee Barrett	15 January 2011	0.667
Minna is thrown off-kilter when her long estranged sister, Frida, returns to Rainbow's End.
21	7	"Insurgent Activity"	Daina Reid	John Reeves	22 January 2011	0.531
The Army come to Rainbow's End to perform a training exercise and Nick is recognised from his time spent in Queensland.
22	8	"Everytime We Say Goodbye"	Daina Reid	John Reeves	29 January 2011	0.558
Louisa is thrown in the deep end when Vivien unexpectedly leaves her to manage the annual Heritage Society fundraising concert.
23	9	"Dirt Rich"	Ted Emery	Yasbelle Dean	5 February 2011	0.696
Louisa and Nick are finally ready to take the plunge — a wedding date is set.
24	10	"Heartache"	Diana Reid	Ellie Beaumont	12 February 2011	0.616
Louisa wants to deliver a great community newspaper but Vivien's absence is making this a challenge so Rita is hired to fill in.
25	11	"Mount Misery"	Ted Emery	Elizabeth Coleman	19 February 2011	0.669
Louisa wants her wedding to be special and has been searching for something meaningful to wear. In a surprising gesture Minna offers to buy Louisa a dress and so along with Holly, the women embark on a shopping expedition to Melbourne. But the weekend goes horribly awry when they breakdown in the bush and become stranded without mobile coverage.
26	12	"Forged by Fire"	Ted Emery	Jutta Goetz	26 February 2011	0.689
Louisa wants for nothing more than to be married to Nick but things are not going according to plan. With adverse weather conditions and fire warnings, Rainbows End is instructed to enact their fire plans. Nick is called to duty with the CFA to fight the fires and the wedding is postponed.

== Ratings ==
Bed of Roses : Australia viewers per episode (thousands)

Season	Episode number												Average
Season	1	2	3	4	5	6	7	8	9	10	11	12	Average
1	1070	955	970	1020	854	961	–						972
2	675	615	492	613	578	726	617	651	–				621
3	767	673	565	714	681	667	531	558	696	616	669	689	652

Source: Audience measurement performed by OzTAM
