= Australian Film Institute Global Achievement Award =

Australian film and TV award

Global Achievement Award AACTA Award
- Country: Australia
- Presented by: Australian Film Institute (AFI)
- First award: 2001
- Final award: 2007
- Website: https://www.aacta.org

The Australian Film Institute Global Achievement Award was a special award presented by the Australian Film Institute (AFI) to "recognise outstanding achievement by Australians working internationally", to an individual who has "demonstrated outstanding excellence in their field and shows a continuing commitment to the Australian film and television industry." It was handed out at the Australian Film Institute Awards (known commonly as the AFI Awards), which are now the AACTA Awards after the establishment of the Australian Academy of Cinema and Television Arts (AACTA), by the AFI. The award was presented from 2001-2004 before it was split into two categories for International Best Actor and International Best Actress, but it was handed out again in 2007.

== Winners ==
Year	Recipient(s)	Notes
2001 (43rd)	Russell Crowe	
2002 (44th)	Mel Gibson	
2003 (45th)	Geoffrey Rush	
2004 (46th)	Naomi Watts	
2007 (49th)	George Miller	For Happy Feet

== See also ==
- Australian Film Institute International Award for Best Actor
- Australian Film Institute International Award for Best Actress
- AACTA Awards
