= The Woolgatherer =

- Original language: English
- Written by: William Mastrosimone
- Genre: comedy

Premiere
- Date: 1979
- Place: Rutgers University

The Woolgatherer is a play by William Mastrosimone. It originally premiered at the Theatre at Rutgers University in 1979. It was printed in 1981.

The play is William Mastrosimone's first play.

It has been produced a number of times and has won awards, including the L.A. Drama Critics Award in 1982.

== Plot ==
It is a two-act play, set entirely in a small apartment in South Philadelphia. It centers around Rose and Cliff, two neurotic people searching for love. Rose is a nervous and flighty woman who is haunted by the past and obsessed with destruction; due to her hemophilia, she's closed herself off from the world. She works at a five-and-dime behind the candy counter. She dreams of true love and how she'll meet a man one day who is perfect for her.

Cliff is a foul-mouthed, wise-cracking transcontinental truck driver who gets stuck in town when his truck breaks down. While he is waiting for his rig to be repaired, he wanders into Rose's store looking for a one-night stand. Rose then invites him over to her apartment and they start to argue about issues like her old and cranky neighbor and her boarded up window.

Towards the end of the play, the reader finds out that Rose does a number of strange things including putting on perfume and a hair ribbon before going to sleep. Cliff thinks that another man is there, so he forces himself in and looks around expecting to find a lover, but instead finding a collection of men's sweaters in her closet. He soon finds out about her weird collection of men's sweaters.

Earlier in the play, Rose recalls a story from her past. She was watching some birds at the zoo, when a group of boys started antagonizing her and throwing stones at the birds. The boys kill the birds, she panics and the police come and take her to the hospital to calm her down. Hints throughout the play suggest that the boys did more to her than talk dirty and kill the birds. It is a possibility that the birds were a metaphor, and the boys actually raped or hurt her physically. Like the birds, her spirit or some part of her could have been metaphorically "killed".

This point in the play is when you can really start to tell that Rose is mentally unstable.

Despite their differences, the two characters end up falling in love at the end of the play.
