= List of The Games episodes =

The Games is an Australian mockumentary television series about the 2000 Summer Olympics in Sydney. The series was originally broadcast on the ABC and had two seasons of 13 episodes each, the first in 1998 and the second in 2000.

The Games starred satirists John Clarke and Bryan Dawe, along with Australian comedian Gina Riley and actor Nicholas Bell.

== Series 1 (1998) ==
No.	Title	Directed by	Written by	Original release date
1	"The Press Conference"	Bruce Permezel	John Clarke & Ross Stevenson	17 August 1998
Barrie Cassidy analyses John, Bryan and Gina's performance at their recent press conference.
2	"Athletics Schedule"	Bruce Permezel	John Clarke & Ross Stevenson	24 August 1998
The pros and cons of holding the Athletics in the early hours of the morning Australian time (to suit the US television market) are discussed. At drinks, John, Bryan and Gina discuss which sports and activities should (and shouldn't) be included at the Olympic Games.
3	"Funding"	Bruce Permezel	John Clarke & Ross Stevenson	31 August 1998
Gina tries to persuade John to do more press interviews. Bryan attempts to organise sponsorship—from a tobacco company.
4	"Robbo and the 100 Metres"	Bruce Permezel	John Clarke & Ross Stevenson	7 September 1998
John and Bryan discuss (with the builder) the fact that the 100 metre athletics track in the main stadium is only 94 metres long. John indicates the inevitable problem to the builder by pointing out that due to the shorter track, Bryan currently holds the Australia record for the "100 metre" sprint race. The Olympics supremo (Gary Robertson) holds a press conference concerning the environmental impact of the games.
5	"Past Sports Stars and Gender"	Bruce Permezel	John Clarke & Ross Stevenson	14 September 1998
Gina, John and David Pigot (Sports Accreditation Board) argue about which event an athlete (who has had a sex-change) should be allowed to enter. John and Bryan discuss whether the sports stars of the past were better than the sports stars of the present.
6	"Millennium Bug"	Bruce Permezel	John Clarke, Ross Stevenson, Bryan Dawe, Gary McCaffrie	21 September 1998
The problems that the Y2K bug may present for the games begin to dawn on the organisers. Gina, John and Bryan give a live Internet chat session—trying to answer questions they'd rather not.
7	"Dead Man"	Bruce Permezel	John Clarke & Ross Stevenson	28 September 1998
The death of an IOC delegate proves useful to Brian and Gina when they enlist him to help vote down some troublesome scheduling arrangements. Bryan and Jasmine dash to the airport to pick up visiting dignitaries.
8	"Lateline/Rural"	Bruce Permezel	John Clarke, Ross Stevenson, Linda Haggar, Fahey Younger, Tim Harris	5 October 1998
John appears on television to deflect the suggestion that the Australian government should indemnify foreign athletes against developing skin cancer after competing at the Games. Gina and Bryan entertain two country ladies who present their quaint country-based concept for the Games' opening ceremony (despite the fact that the contract has already been awarded to the German company Eine Farht). Upon returning from his interview, John takes part in the discussions with the ladies—almost with tragic consequences when the ladies demonstrate their proposed fiery finale. Maxine McKew and Linley Frame appear as themselves in the television interview with John.
9	"J'Accuse"	Bruce Permezel	John Clarke & Ross Stevenson	12 October 1998
When a journalist promises to expose irregularities with the Games' budget, John organises a confidence trick using the voice impersonator Gerry Connolly to solve the potential disaster. Thwarting John, Gina manages to stop a new infallible drug testing method being proposed for the Games.
10	"A Management Course"	Bruce Permezel	John Clarke & Ross Stevenson	19 October 1998
John, Bryan and Gina attend a management course designed to improve their problem solving skills, but find their time occupied with real problems related to the Games (including being "one venue short"). The episode was filmed at Lindenderry, Red Hill (which is south of Melbourne, and not in the Blue Mountains as the episode suggests).
11	"A Conflict of Interest"	Bruce Permezel	John Clarke & Ross Stevenson	26 October 1998
John's concerns about a prominent Sydney businessman obtaining a seat on SOCOG prove groundless after the businessman is shot dead by his girlfriend's husband in an apparent "conflict of interest". John and Bryan are troubled by plans to sell Games venues to American corporate interests. Francis Greenslade guest-stars as a gossip-columnist.
12	"Horse and Dream Team"	Bruce Permezel	John Clarke, Ross Stevenson, Alan Brough	2 November 1998
John refuses the accommodation request made by the manager of the US basketball team, however on the issue of seeing a kangaroo, John serves up a compromise. Seeking assistance in the issue of the appropriateness of a genetically modified horse being entered in the equestrian event, John and Bryan are disappointed by the contribution of Frank Woodley (who plays a television vet who dislikes animals).
13	"Transport!"	Bruce Permezel	John Clarke & Ross Stevenson	9 November 1998
John investigates the apparent misplacement of the diving pool. Bryan uses experience and contacts to implement the prototype of a transportation fault reporting system. The team work to thwart the plans of a transportation company (Citytrans World—headed by CEO Sam Neill). Dave Graney makes a silent appearance in a meeting.

== Series 2 (2000) ==
No.	Title	Directed by	Written by	Original release date
1	"In the Public Interest"	Bruce Permezel	John Clarke & Ross Stevenson	19 June 2000
A catch-up episode that re-introduces the characters involved in organising the Olympics, and which details progress made over the previous eighteen months. David Hookes, Michael Kroger and Angela Pearman make guest appearances as themselves. Kim Gyngell plays a character who is deeply implicated in corrupt activity to do with the organisation of the games.
2	"Talking to the Troops"	Bruce Permezel	John Clarke & Ross Stevenson	26 June 2000
John, Bryan and Gina attempt to answer difficult questions in an extended meeting for the Games' internal staff. The team's negative attitude to the continual filming of their daily activities takes a turn for the better when the amount of money generated by the documentary is revealed.
3	"Reconciliation"	Bruce Permezel	John Clarke & Ross Stevenson	3 July 2000
John is the only person at a transport meeting as everyone else has problems attending (due to transportation problems). A Mr Sydney Olympic Games claims trademark infringement over the use of his name by the Games, however the minister's secretary manages to throw someone else's money at the problem. Gina finds it impossible to interest any media outlet to cover the remote parts of the Olympic torch relay. The US Special Ambassador draws attention to the plight of Australian Aboriginals, and matters worsen for the team when two indigenous people reveal that there is now an Olympic shooting venue on top of their native land. Gina saves the day by obtaining an "apology" from John Howard (the actor).
4	"IOC Man"	Bruce Permezel	John Clarke & Ross Stevenson	10 July 2000
A con man poses as a visiting IOC official and manages to extract over $25,000 worth of hospitality from Gina, however he also manages to spot a much bigger con job perpetrated by the Australian Federal government in its attempt to reclassify the Sydney Olympic games as belonging to all of Australia.
5	"Inquiry"	Bruce Permezel	John Clarke & Ross Stevenson	17 July 2000
The team learn how to handle the difficult questions asked by independent inquiries with responses such as: "not in my presence", and "not to my knowledge", and "may I have a glass of water".
6	"Pommy Visitor"	Bruce Permezel	John Clarke & Ross Stevenson	24 July 2000
An English representative of the London 2012 Olympic bid committee visits the team, and in wanting to make himself useful manages to sell (the leased) furniture of the Sydney Olympic committee. The sale (authorised by the minister) causes embarrassment to the minister when it is discovered that his signature is on the original lease. Maxine McKew appears as herself.
7	"Immigration"	Bruce Permezel	John Clarke & Ross Stevenson	31 July 2000
The episode begins with Bryan and Gina playing a practical joke on John (to do with a quid pro quo job that Bryan claims has been promised to the daughter of an IOC official from Mulravia). For some reason, the minister's secretary has issued a press release (under Gina's name) stating that the average visitor arriving at Sydney Airport will be able to clear customs in fifteen minutes, however the claim outrages Gina who knows that it will take more like two hours. John and Gina fight to thwart the minister's plans to import talented foreign athletes to compete as Australians (while seeking asylum from a country different even to their own)—all in an attempt to boost Australia's medal count. John is left to interpret (to an Australian journalist) in one such case where a champion Scottish skeet-shooter is claiming to be a Bulgarian wrestler, however as neither John or the Scotsman speak Bulgarian, they make do with a combination of esoteric Scottish poetry and Russian phrases.
8	"Job Search"	Bruce Permezel	John Clarke & Ross Stevenson	7 August 2000
As Bryan and Gina are spending a lot of time organising jobs for themselves following the Olympics, John becomes determined to refocus them; however John's focus takes a surprising turn while wining and dining a visiting official from the Greece Olympics organising committee.
9	"Strike"	Bruce Permezel	John Clarke & Ross Stevenson	14 August 2000
Bryan demonstrates to a sceptical John how companies can take financial advantage of the Olympic Games organising committee. Gina's attempt to embarrass the minister by causing a strike during the Olympics backfires when the trade union official involved caves in to Gina's aggressive negotiating style.
10	"Solar"	Bruce Permezel	John Clarke & Ross Stevenson	21 August 2000
The team find a way not to accept the loan of Picasso's Guernica painting for display during the games. It seems that the games organisation has been generating electricity (via solar panels) which causes much discussion about how the buying and selling of power should occur.
11	"Sponsorship and Media Discontent"	Bruce Permezel	John Clarke & Ross Stevenson	28 August 2000
The team struggle with disgruntled sponsors who are not going to be given the event ticket allocation they were promised. After making indiscreet comments at a dinner, John is sent on a one-week holiday; however, his presence is needed again to solve the problem of an athlete who has changed her name to be the same as a prominent soft drink company—which is unfortunately not the same soft drink company that is a main sponsor of the games.
12	"Four Corners"	Bruce Permezel	John Clarke & Ross Stevenson	4 September 2000
When Four Corners threatens to broadcast a secretly filmed meeting at which John and Bryan suggest that the rich in Australian should pay their fair share of tax, the minister's secretary (Nicolas) tries to convince the team that he can have the program stopped if they all come and work at a soon-to-be-created department (The Office for the Introduction of the Republic) that he is going to manage. A revised program does go to air—implicating Nicolas in the formation of a bogus department in order to buy people's silence.
13	"The End"	Bruce Permezel	John Clarke & Ross Stevenson	11 September 2000
When an act for the closing ceremony (The Seekers) turns out to be unavailable, the team stand in as understudies during a rehearsal. John Farnham provides personal instruction to another understudy—the team's secretary (Tim) who has obtained a place in the opening ceremony. The series ends with the minister's secretary and the team scoring "the best seats in the house"—an aircraft ride out of Australia during the Olympic Games. Comedian Tony Martin makes a subliminal cameo as a barman. The Olympics started on the 15th of September. Ironically, the Seekers were meant to play at the real closing ceremony, but Judith Durham broke her hip, meaning she was unavailable, the Seekers sang at the closing of the Paralympics.
