= List of 2001 box office number-one films in Australia =

This is a list of films which placed number-one at the weekend box office in Australia during 2001. Amounts are in Australian dollars.

N/A denotes information that is not available from Urban Cinefile nor Movie Marshal.

== Number-one films ==
†	This implies the highest-grossing movie of the year.

#	Weekend End Date	Film	Box office	Notes
1	7 January 2001	Meet the Parents	$3,232,242	
2	14 January 2001	What Women Want	$5,117,384	
3	21 January 2001	Cast Away	$4,539,061	
4	28 January 2001	Cast Away	$3,627,587	
5	4 February 2001	Cast Away	$2,150,152	
6	11 February 2001	Cast Away	$1,392,345	
7	18 February 2001	Hannibal	$4,247,648	Hannibal set a record February opening and a record for an age-restricted film
8	25 February 2001	Hannibal	$1,785,493	
9	4 March 2001	Proof of Life	$1,502,269	
10	11 March 2001	Traffic	$2,616,932	
11	18 March 2001	Miss Congeniality	$4,330,856	
12	25 March 2001	Miss Congeniality	$3,473,454	
13	1 April 2001	Miss Congeniality	$1,999,690	
14	8 April 2001	Save the Last Dance	$1,587,517	
15	15 April 2001	Crocodile Dundee in Los Angeles	$2,257,164	
16	22 April 2001	Rugrats in Paris: The Movie	$2,156,887	Rugrats in Paris: The Movie reached number one in its fourth week of release
17	29 April 2001	The Mexican	$1,839,550	
18	6 May 2001	The Mexican	$1,093,477	
19	13 May 2001	The Mummy Returns	$5,440,204	
20	20 May 2001	The Mummy Returns	$3,227,374	
21	27 May 2001	Moulin Rouge!	$3,655,261	
22	3 June 2001	Moulin Rouge!	$3,589,500	
23	10 June 2001	Pearl Harbor	$6,680,157	
24	17 June 2001	Pearl Harbor	$2,976,993	
25	24 June 2001	Lara Croft: Tomb Raider	$5,105,317	
26	1 July 2001	Shrek †	$3,273,603	Shrek reached number one in its fourth week on the chart
27	8 July 2001	Shrek †	$3,169,980	
28	15 July 2001	Shrek †	$3,085,851	
29	22 July 2001	Shrek †	$2,102,945	
30	29 July 2001	Bridget Jones's Diary	$3,926,141	
31	5 August 2001	Bridget Jones's Diary	$2,952,549	
32	12 August 2001	Planet of the Apes	$3,981,914	
33	19 August 2001	Planet of the Apes	$2,131,017	
34	26 August 2001	A Knight's Tale	$2,233,374	
35	2 September 2001	Jurassic Park III	$3,742,739	
36	9 September 2001	Jurassic Park III	$2,053,941	
37	16 September 2001	A.I. Artificial Intelligence	$1,591,000	
38	23 September 2001	The Fast and the Furious	$3,300,893	
39	30 September 2001	Rush Hour 2	$4,334,524	
40	7 October 2001	Cats & Dogs	$2,691,589	Cats & Dogs reached number one in its third week of release
41	14 October 2001	Legally Blonde	$2,539,971	
42	21 October 2001	Scary Movie 2	$1,507,503	
43	28 October 2001	The Man Who Sued God	$1,530,832	
44	4 November 2001	The Man Who Sued God	$1,341,408	
45	11 November 2001	The Others	$2,570,457	
46	18 November 2001	The Others	$1,787,925	
47	25 November 2001	The Others	N/A	The Others grossed $1,690,869 for the week ended 28 November
48	2 December 2001	Harry Potter and the Philosopher's Stone	$9,249,505	
49	9 December 2001	Harry Potter and the Philosopher's Stone	$5,157,175	
50	16 December 2001	Harry Potter and the Philosopher's Stone	$3,207,844	
51	23 December 2001	Harry Potter and the Philosopher's Stone	$2,279,772	
52	30 December 2001	The Lord of the Rings: The Fellowship of the Ring	$9,749,937	

== See also ==
- List of Australian films — Australian films by year
