= The Games (Australian TV series) =

Mockumentary about preparations for 2000 Olympic Games in Sydney

- Created by: John Clarke; Ross Stevenson
- Written by: John Clarke; Ross Stevenson
- Directed by: Bruce Permezel
- Starring: John Clarke; Bryan Dawe; Gina Riley; Nicholas Bell
- Composer: Jeremy Smith
- Country of origin: Australia
- Original language: English
- No. of series: 2
- No. of episodes: 26 (list of episodes)

Production
- Executive producer: Denise Eriksen
- Editor: Wayne Hyett
- Running time: 26 minutes per episode
- Production companies: ABC Television; Beyond Television Productions (1998)

Original release
- Network: ABC TV
- Release: 17 August 1998 – 11 September 2000

The Games is an Australian mockumentary television series about the 2000 Summer Olympics in Sydney. The series was originally broadcast on the ABC and had two seasons of 13 episodes each, the first in 1998 and the second in 2000.

The Games starred satirists John Clarke and Bryan Dawe along with Australian comedian Gina Riley and actor Nicholas Bell. It was written by John Clarke and Ross Stevenson. The series centred on the Sydney Organising Committee for the Olympic Games (SOCOG) and satirized corruption and cronyism in the Olympic movement, bureaucratic ineptness in the New South Wales public service, and unethical behavior within politics and the media. An unusual feature of the show was that the characters shared the same name as the actors who played them, to enhance the illusion of a documentary on the Sydney Games.

== Cast ==
John Clarke played the "Head of Administration & Logistics", an undefined but important subsection of SOCOG. Clarke was apparently a former Olympic champion, but ducked the question whenever asked about which event. Gina Riley played the "Manager Marketing & Liaison" role, and Bryan Dawe played the "Manager Accounts, Budgeting & Finance" position. The series also featured actor Nicholas Bell as the conniving Secretary to the Minister for the Olympics, a foil for Clarke's character. He was a guest in the first series but was made a main cast member for Series 2.

Guest stars included John Farnham, Dave Gray, Frank Woodley, Barrie Cassidy, Maxine McKew, Sam Neill, Gerry Connolly, Kim Gyngell, Tony Martin, John Howard, The Seekers and Dave Graney.

== Episodes ==
The final episode was broadcast days before the opening ceremony of the real Games. In this episode, the three stars and Bell were forced to stand in for The Seekers at the closing ceremony rehearsal to sing "The Carnival Is Over". The Seekers did indeed perform this song, but at the closing ceremony of the Paralympics some weeks later.

In one moment, the actor John Howard appeared on a video message intended for overseas release and read an apology to Aboriginal people for crimes committed against them by the Australian government. In the episode, a group of overseas countries threatened to boycott the Games unless the prime minister, also named John Howard, gave a public apology to Aboriginal people. The message was accompanied by John Clarke's saying "that's not the Prime Minister", to which Gina Riley replied, "He never said he was. He said he was John Howard." The confusion between the two men has become a frequent joke in Australia. In an interview after the real Games John Clarke commented that most of the shows were inventions by the writers. He went on to say that if they had used some of the things that had happened at SOCOG, people would have criticised them for being unrealistic.

== Reception ==
The Games was named Most Outstanding Comedy Program at the Logie Awards of 2001. John Clarke and Ross Stevenson won Best Screenplay in a Television Drama at the 43rd Australian Film Institute Awards for the episode Solar. Season 1 was released on DVD by Umbrella Entertainment in December 2004, Season 2 was released by ABC DVD in December 2009. All episodes are on PAL format VHS.

In New Zealand, the series was one of the first programs on TVNZ 6 on 30 September 2007, the day of the channel's launch.

In Australia, The Comedy Channel currently airs the series as part of their Aussie Gold block hosted by Frank Woodley. The show has since returned to the ABC.

== Spin-off ==
Clarke and Riley were due to reprise their roles in a spin-off series The Games: London Calling, in which the characters became consultants to the 2012 Summer Olympics. The series did not go into production by the Nine Network.

== Twenty Twelve plagiarism accusation ==
In 2011, the BBC TV mockumentary Twenty Twelve was criticised by The Games' makers as bearing a strong resemblance to the earlier Australian series, with Clarke saying, "We worked very hard on that project and we had long conversations with these people who've now done a show like that in Britain". The BBC denied claims of plagiarism, saying: "It is a very different show, the only similarities between them are that they are both set around the Olympics".

Clarke's website later called The Games' writers "John [Clarke] and Ross Stevenson, who run a charitable institute supplying formats to British television".
