= Sibylla Budd =

Australian actress

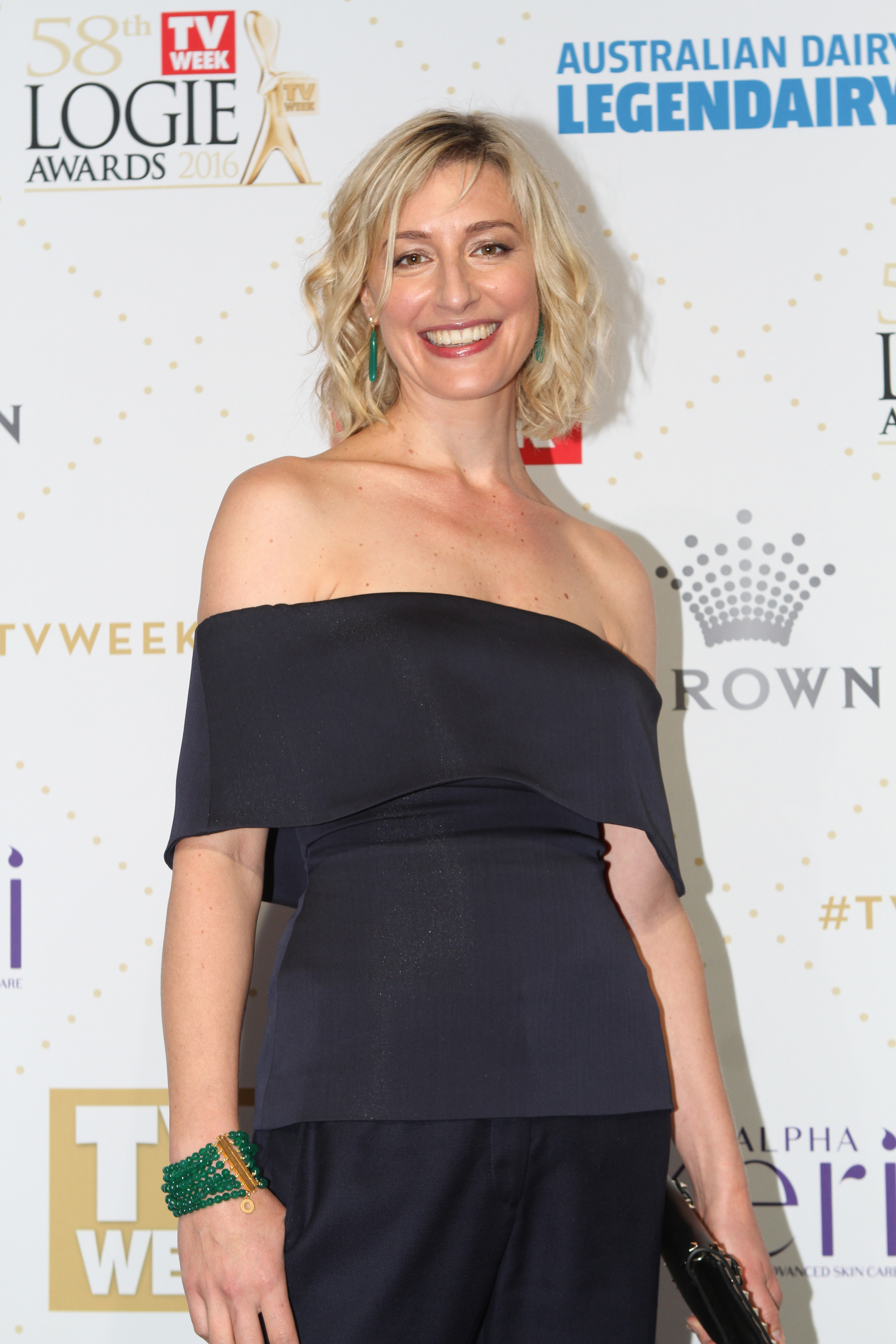
- Budd at the 2016 TV Week Logie Awards
- Born: Sibylla Marguerite Budd; 19 September 1976 (age 50); Australia
- Occupation: Actress
- Years active: 2000–present

Sibylla Budd (born 19 September 1976) is an Australian actress perhaps best known for her roles in the television series The Secret Life of Us and Winners & Losers.

== Early life ==
Budd grew up in Canberra, as one of four siblings. She has an older brother, Alex, and two younger brothers, Hamilton and Henry.

She attended Canberra Girls' Grammar School where she became interesting in acting while performing in plays. After high school, Budd travelled overseas and worked in a pub in Cambridge, England, for six months. When she returned to Australia, she studied acting at the University of Western Sydney, before being accepted into the Victorian College of the Arts (VCA) in 1997. She graduated with a Bachelor of Dramatic Art in 2000.

== Career ==
In 2000 Budd appeared in the Australian Broadcasting Corporation (ABC) soap opera Something in the Air playing Sharon. In 2001 she was the leading female in The Bank as Michelle Roberts, and played Sam Cooper in the TV miniseries The Farm. That year she also began playing her break-out role of Gabrielle Kovich in The Secret Life of Us.

Budd left The Secret Life of Us in late 2003, a year before the series was cancelled. In 2005, she joined the cast of medical drama series All Saints playing Dyanna Richardson whose role was Nursing Unit Manager. In 2007 Budd appeared in Channel Nine's naval drama, Sea Patrol as marine biologist Ursula Morrell and in the feature film directorial debut of Gallipoli actor Mark Lee in The Bet, starring alongside Matthew Newton, Aden Young and Australian acting veteran Roy Billing.

Budd also had a guest role in an episode of the Australian comedy series, Kath & Kim as character Sharon Strezlecki's childhood friend.

In 2008 Budd appeared in the $40million advertising campaign to sell Australia, directed by Baz Luhrmann for Tourism Australia entitled "Come Walkabout" with Matthew Le Nevez.

In 2013 Budd appeared in a recurring role on Seven Network's Winners & Losers as Carla Hughes, the Head of Emergency, beginning in Season 3. She also had a guest-starring role in Peter Helliar's series for the Australian Broadcasting Corporation series, It's a Date.

After the 2003 season of Secret Life, Budd joined her co-star Deborah Mailman on a journey to Tanzania with World Vision. The documentary The Secret Life of Tanzania was screened on Australian television in January 2004.

In August 2006 Budd was appointed member of the Advertising Standards Bureau, an advertising industry self-regulation body concerned with standards of advertising material in print, television and radio media.

In 2025, Budd appeared as Channel 9 60 Minutes reporter Tara Brown in Netflix series Apple Cider Vinegar, the series recreated the Belle Gibson interview.

== Personal life ==
Budd met her future husband Peter Carstairs when Carstairs cast Budd in his first feature film, September in 2007. They were married in 2010 and had their first son, Albie in 2011. Their two other children are Freddy and Audrey.

Budd's father, Dale, was Malcolm Fraser’s Chief of Staff – both when Fraser was Minister for Defence from 1970 to 1971, and Prime Minister from 1975 to 1978.

Fellow actor Patrick Brammall was a friend of Budd's when she was in early high school.

== Acting credits ==
=== Television ===
Year	Film	Role	Notes
2000	Something in the Air	Sharon	TV series, season 1 episode 59: "We'll Talk About It in the Morning"
2001	The Secret Life of Us	Gabrielle Kovich	TV film
2001	The Farm	Sam Cooper	TV miniseries, 3 episodes
2001–2003	The Secret Life of Us	Gabrielle Kovich	TV series, seasons 1–3, 66 episodes
2003	Kath and Kim	Lisa-Marie Birkenstock	TV series, season 2, episode 3: "The Moon"
2004	The Secret Life of Tanzania	Herself	TV documentary special
2005–2006	All Saints	Deanna Richardson	TV series, seasons 8–9, 13 episodes
2007	Sea Patrol	Dr. Ursula Morrell	TV series, season 1, 6 episodes
2008	Canal Road	Daina Connelly	TV miniseries, 10 episodes
2013	It's a Date	Imogen	TV series, season 1, 2 episodes
2013	Miss Fisher's Murder Mysteries	Renee Fleuri	TV series, season 2, episode 5: "Murder à la Mode"
2013	Redfern Now	Detective Morris	TV series, season 2, episode 3: '"Babe in Arms"
2013–2015	Winners and Losers	Carla Hughes	TV series, seasons 3–4, 39 episodes
2014	The Doctor Blake Mysteries	Martha Harris	TV series, season 2, episode 3: "A Foreign Field"
2014	Rake	Mrs. Guilfoyle QC	TV series, season 3, episode 7
2015	Tattoo Tales	Narrator	Documentary TV series, 8 episodes
2016	Tomorrow, When the War Began	Rachel Maxwell	TV series, 6 episodes
2018	Picnic at Hanging Rock	Mrs Valange	TV miniseries, 3 episodes
2020	Mint Condition	Audrey	Online comedy/drama series
2020	Operation Buffalo	Lorraine Carmichael	TV miniseries, 3 episodes
2022	Summer Love	Jules	TV series, episode 1: "Jules and Tom & Jonah and Steph"
2025	Apple Cider Vinegar	Tara Brown	TV miniseries, 3 episodes
2025	Ten Pound Poms	Hilary Moreland	TV series: 2 episodes
2026	Bad Company	Caitlen Allard	TV series, season 1, 1 episode

=== Film ===
Year	Title	Role	Notes
2001	The Bank	Michelle	Feature film
2006	The Bet	Tory	Feature film
2006	The Book of Revelation	Deborah	Feature film
2007	September	Miss Gregory	Feature film
2012	Pause	Voice	Short film
2015	Jump!	Melody Merriwether	Short film
2023	Favourites	Justine	Short film

=== Theatre ===
Year	Title	Role	Venue / Co.
2004	The Memory of Water	Catherine	Space 28 with MTC
2005	Ray's Tempest	Cynthia Cornish	Belvoir Street Theatre, Sydney
2006	The Emperor of Sydney	Gillian	Stables Theatre, Sydney with Griffin Theatre Company
2008	Boeing-Boeing	Gretchen	Comedy Theatre, Melbourne, Theatre Royal Sydney with Newtheatricals
2008	Yibiyung	Lady	Belvoir Street Theatre, Sydney, Malthouse Theatre, Melbourne with Company B
2009	Playwriting Australia Showcase		Theatre Royal, Hobart for National Play Festival
2009	The Lonesome West	Girleen	Belvoir Street Theatre, Sydney with B Sharp
2010	Betrayal	Emma	Cremorne Theatre, Brisbane with Queensland Theatre
