= Jan Chapman =

Australian film producer

Jan Chapman AO
- Born: 28 March 1950 (age 76); Newcastle, New South Wales, Australia
- Occupation: Film producer
- Spouses: Phillip Noyce (m. 1971–1977); Stephen O'Rourke (m. 1985)
- Children: 1

Jan Chapman AO (born 28 March 1950) is an Australian film producer. Films produced by Chapman include The Last Days of Chez Nous (1992), The Piano (1993), Love Serenade (1996), Holy Smoke! (1999), and Lantana (2001).

While studying English and Fine Arts at Sydney University in the late 1960s Chapman began working on small, independent films, as part of the nascent Sydney Filmmakers Co-op, which included her first husband, film director Phillip Noyce. After the Film Co-op moved into its premises in Darlinghurst, she was involved for a time with the Sydney Women's Film Group while working in the Education department of the Australian Broadcasting Corporation (ABC). Subsequently as a producer at the ABC she was responsible for a number of TV series including Sweet and Sour, and with Sandra Levy produced the much acclaimed Come In Spinner (ABC TV miniseries 1990).

== Awards and honours ==
Chapman was nominated for the Best Picture at the AFI Awards in 1992 for The Last Days of Chez Nous. In 1994, she was nominated for the Academy Award for Best Picture for The Piano.

Chapman was made an Officer of the Order of Australia in the 2004 Australia Day Honours for "service to the Australian film industry as a producer and as a contributor to organisations providing strategic direction to the industry".

== 89th Academy Awards ==
Chapman's photo was mistakenly displayed next to Janet Patterson's name during the In Memoriam segment at the 89th Academy Awards. Shortly after the flub, Chapman announced publicly that she is "alive and well," and was given an apology.
