= Robert Connolly =

Australian film director, producer and screenwriter

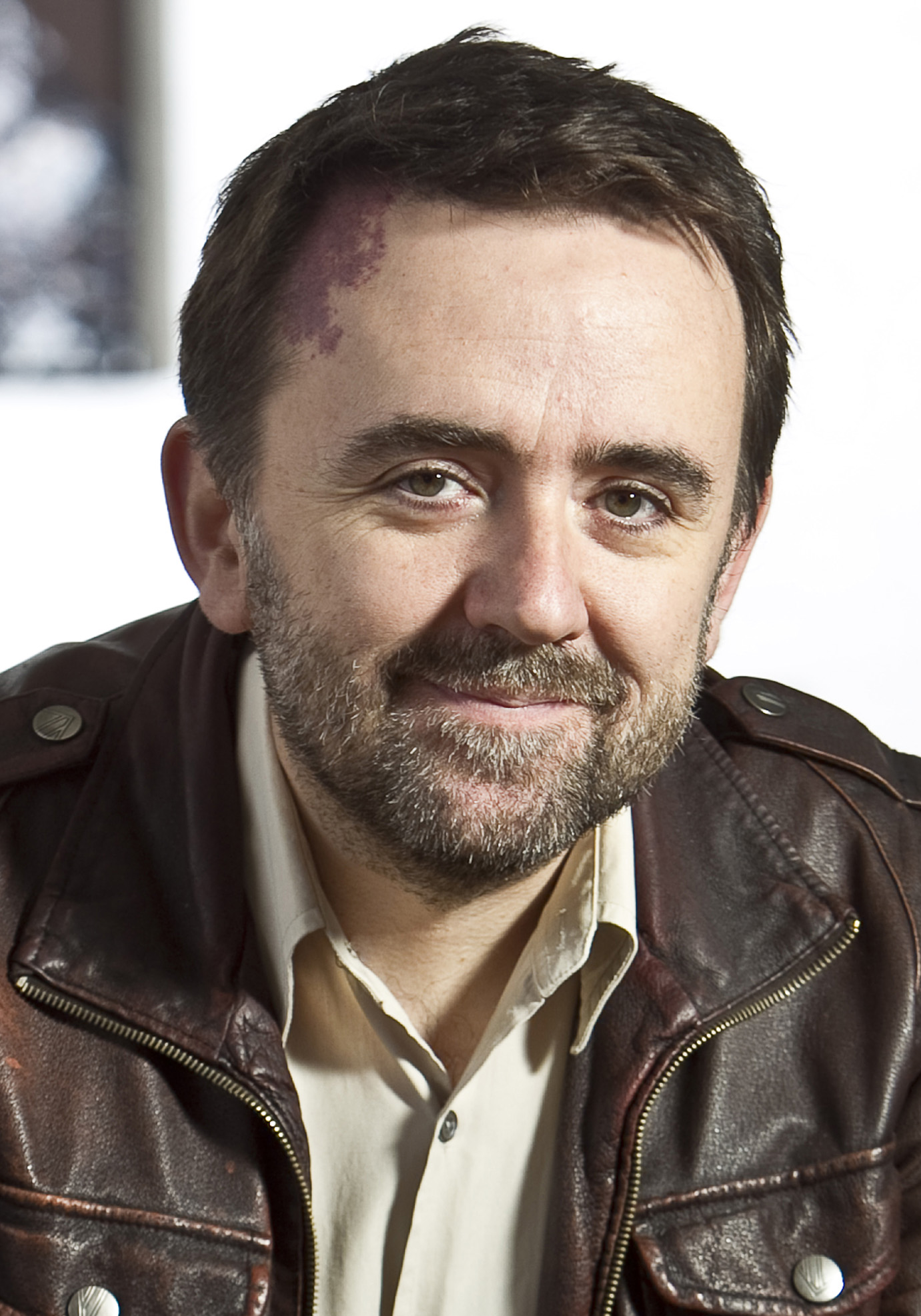
- Connolly in 2012
- Born: 1967 (age 58–59)
- Occupations: Film director, producer, screenwriter

Robert Connolly (born 1967) is an Australian film director, producer, and screenwriter based in Melbourne, Victoria. He is best known as the director and writer of the feature films Balibo, Three Dollars, The Bank and The Dry and its sequel, as well as the producer of Romulus, My Father and The Boys. He is head of the film distribution company, Footprint Films, owned by Arenafilms.

== Early life and education ==
Connolly was born in 1967. Along with David Wenham, he worked in theatre before transitioning to filmmaking. They were both involved in a production of The Boys at the Griffin Theatre Company in Sydney. Connolly graduated from the Australian Film, Television and Radio School (AFTRS) in the late 1990s, where he undertook a three-year course that included directing.

== Career ==
Connolly made his first feature film as producer, The Boys in 1998, which had its world premiere in competition at the Berlin International Film Festival. His first film as director, The Bank, was produced by his former mentor and later business partner at Arenafilm John Maynard.

In 2007 Connolly and Maynard together produced the period immigration drama Romulus, My Father, directed by Richard Roxburgh, starring Eric Bana and Franka Potente.

By 2013, he had written and directed four feature films and produced around 12 others, as well as doing work for television.

He directed and produced Paper Planes (2014), The Dry (2020), Blueback (2022) and Force of Nature: The Dry 2 (2024) and has been nominated for or won numerous Australian and international awards (see lists below).

=== Balibo ===
In 2009, Connolly directed Balibo, which he co-wrote with David Williamson. The film examines the politically fraught deaths of Australian-based journalists the Balibo Five and Roger East during the Indonesian invasion of East Timor in 1975. Maynard produced the film, which starred Anthony LaPaglia in the lead role of East. Balibo was the first feature to be shot in East Timor.

Indonesia continues to maintain that the Balibo Five died accidentally in crossfire as its troops battled East Timorese Fretilin rebels, a version of events accepted by successive Australian governments. But the film depicts the young journalists, who were working for Australian TV networks and presumed their nationality afforded them protection, being slaughtered on the orders of Indonesian military chiefs to prevent news of the invasion reaching the world.

Connolly refuses to apologise for his film's hardline stance, stating that an Australian coroner found in 2007 that the journalists were executed as they tried to surrender to Indonesian forces. He said: "It's quite clear the journalists were murdered... The current Indonesian and Australian (Government) point of view that they were killed in crossfire is quite frankly absurd. I'd imagine the film will be confronting because it represents something contrary to the official view." He points out that the East Timorese Truth and Reconciliation Commission found that up to 183,000 East Timorese people died as a result of the conflict, when the total population was only around 600,000, while both the Australian Government under the Liberals and the opposition Labor Party were focused on oil and gas resources and regional influence.

== Themes and views ==
Connolly has been definitive about his political approach to filmmaking, saying "Without a doubt, in recent times, the political agenda of the work is what drives us. We feel a responsibility to use cinema to put a blow torch to contemporary Australia and contribute to some discussion or debate about where we're headed. That's what I find most rewarding about it." Three Dollars (2005), The Bank (2001) and The Boys (1998) all have a strong political agenda, and have been released in Australia as a DVD box set along with the documentary The Political Arena, which explores the social and political strands of the films.

In 2008, Connolly published a white paper outlining his views on all that could be improved about the Australian film industry, which includes a ten-step plan for reducing production costs.

== Arenafilm and Footprint Films ==
Arenafilm was first incorporated in 1987 by film producer John Maynard and produced The Navigator: A Medieval Odyssey (1988) and Jane Campion's film s Sweetie (1989) and An Angel at My Table (1990) (with Maynard's partner Bridget Ikin). The company went on to produce The Boys (1998) and several other of Connolly's films, including Balibo. Its history is not clear, but Connolly and Maynard became directors of the company during the 2000s. Connolly relocated to set up the Arenafilm Melbourne office in late 2006 (including Arenamedia) and subsidiary companies.

Footprint Films is the film distribution company owned by Arenafilm. (Note: Not to be confused with the UK film production company, Footprint Films, headed by producers Mark Blaney and Jackie Sheppard, who produced Escape from Pretoria.) Maynard had earlier had a production company called Footstep Films. In December 2007, Film Victoria provided A$750,000 of funding to be shared among Footprint and two other companies.

In 2009, Footprint Films was the Australasian distributor for Balibo and Sarah Watt's My Year Without Sex (both made by Arenafilm), and in the same year, it expanded its operations to acquire and release third-party films. Its first two distribution-only films were Warwick Thornton's Samson and Delilah, and Kriv Stenders' Lucky Country (film). The physical work of distributing is handled by Transmission Films, headed by Richard Payten and Andrew Mackie and backed by Paramount Pictures Australia. Connolly believes that it is healthy for filmmakers to become involved in distribution.

== Recognition and awards ==
The Boys was nominated for 13 AFI Awards including Best Film, and won awards for Best Director, Best Adapted Screenplay, Best Supporting Actor and Best Supporting Actress. In 1998, Connolly was named by Variety as one of the 10 best emerging producers in the world.

Connolly has screened his films at over 30 international film festivals, including the Toronto International Film Festival and San Sebastian Film Festival. He received a Centenary Medal for services to the Australian Film Industry in 2001.

Romulus, My Father won four Australian Film Institute Awards (AFI) including Best Film, and Connolly has also garnered AFI Awards for writing The Bank and Three Dollars.

Matthew Campora, head of screen studies at AFTRS, wrote in 2013 that Connolly was "a director who could be considered amongst the most successful contemporary filmmakers working in Australia today", and "Connolly’s films combine characteristics of the Hollywood thriller with archetypal Australian character types and narrative arcs to create a body of films that continue a particular style of filmmaking identified by [Graeme] Turner in the 1990s".

Connolly was announced as the recipient of the 2025 Don Dunstan Award by Adelaide Film Festival in September 2025. The festival has also commissioned an essay by Sandy George on his contribution to Australian filmmaking.

== Other roles ==
In 2008 Connolly was appointed to the inaugural board of Screen Australia. His term ended on 30 June 2011.

He also served on the boards of the New South Wales Film and Television Office (FTO, predecessor to Screen NSW) and the Australian Directors Guild, as well as the University of New South Wales Dean's Council.

In 2011 Connolly worked on and influenced the development of the unreleased video game Warco, that could be used to train journalists to work and report in war-torn regions.

== Filmography ==
=== Feature films ===
Year	Title	Director	Writer	Producer	Notes
1998	The Boys	No	No	Yes	
2000	The Monkey's Mask	No	No	Yes	
2001	The Bank	Yes	Yes	No	
2005	Three Dollars	Yes	Yes	No	
2007	Romulus, My Father	No	No	Yes	Also second unit director
2009	Balibo	Yes	Yes	No	
2013	The Turning	Yes	Yes	Yes	Segment: "Aquifer"
2015	Paper Planes	Yes	Yes	Yes	
2021	The Dry	Yes	Yes	Yes	
2022	Blueback	Yes	Yes	Yes	
2024	Force of Nature: The Dry 2	Yes	Yes	Yes	
2025	Magic Beach	Yes	Yes	Yes	

==== Executive producer only ====
- Lucky Country (2008)
- These Final Hours (2013)
- The Boy Castaways (2013)
- Spear (2015)
- Chasing Asylum (2016, documentary)
- Guilty (2017, documentary)

==== Associate producer only ====
- All Men Are Liars (1995)

==== Consulting producer only ====
- New Skin (2002)
- West (2007)

==== Consultant only ====
- Better Than Sex (2000)

=== Short films ===
Year	Title	Director	Writer	Producer
1995	Roses Are Red	No	No	Yes
1997	Rust Bucket	Yes	Yes	No
2015	These Final Hours	No	No	Executive

=== Television ===
Year	Title	Director	Writer	Creator	Producer	Notes
2010	Rush	Yes	No	No	No	1 episode; series 3 episode 18
2011	The Slap	Yes	No	No	No	2 episodes
2012	Underground: The Julian Assange Story	Yes	Yes	No	No	Television film
2015	Gallipoli	No	No	No	Yes	Miniseries
2016	Barracuda	Yes	No	No	No	
2017	The Warriors	No	No	Yes	Yes	Also executive producer
2018	Deep State	Yes	No	No	No	4 episodes

== Awards and nominations ==
Year	Title	Wins	Nominations
1995	All Men Are Liars	Cinequest Film Festival – Best First Feature tied with Le secret de Jérôme	Cinequest Film Festival Maverick Spirit Award; AACTA Award for Best Film; AACTA Award for Best Original Screenplay; AACTA Award for Best Production Design; AACTA Award for Best Actor in a Leading Role
1998	The Boys	FCCA Award for Best Film	AACTA Award for Best Film
2001	The Bank	AACTA Award for Best Original Screenplay; Newport Beach Film Festival Jury Award for Best Director; Newport Beach Film Festival Jury Award for Best Screenplay; Palm Springs International Film Festival - Best Director Award; Portland International Film Festival - Audience Award	AACTA Award for Best Direction; BAFICI Award for Best Film; FCCA Award for Best Director; FCCA Award for Best Original Screenplay; Inside Film Award for Best Direction Inside Film Award for Best Script
2005	Three Dollars	AACTA Award for Best Adapted Screenplay; Montreal World Film Festival - Special Mention; Montreal World Film Festival - Grand Prix des Amériques	FCCA Award for Best Adapted Screenplay
2007	Romulus, My Father	AACTA Award for Best Film	FCCA Award for Best Film
2009	Balibo	AACTA Award for Best Adapted Screenplay; ADG Award for Best Direction in a Feature Film; São Paulo International Film Festival - Audience Award for Best Foreign Feature Film	AACTA Award for Best Direction; FCCA Award for Best Director; FCCA Award for Best Screenplay Inside Film Award for Best Feature Film
2012	Underground: The Julian Assange Story	AWGIE Award for Best Telemovie Adaptation	
2013	The Turning		AACTA Award for Best Film; AACTA Award for Best Direction; AFCA Award for Best Film; Asia Pacific Screen Award for Best Film
2015	Paper Planes	AACTA Award for Best Original Screenplay; FCCA Award for Best Children's Film; Jerusalem Film Festival - Cinematheque Young Critics Club Award for Best Children's Film	AACTA Award for Best Film; AACTA People's Choice Award for Favourite Australian Film ADG Award for Best Direction in a Feature Film; AWGIE Award for Best Writing in a Feature Film - Original; Berlin International Film Festival - Crystal Bear; FCCA Award for Best Film; FCCA Award for Best Script/Screenplay; Seattle International Film Festival - Films4Families Youth Jury Award
2021	The Dry	AACTA Award for Best Adapted Screenplay	AACTA Award for Best Film; AACTA Award for Best Direction
