= Bird in the Wire =

- Directed by: Phillip Donnellon
- Written by: Phillip Donnellon
- Produced by: Phillip Donnellon
- Starring: Christine Wilson; Kate Jane Norris; Valerie Bean
- Cinematography: John Brawley
- Edited by: Andrew Connell
- Distributed by: AtomShockwave
- Release date: 2001
- Running time: 3 Minutes
- Country: Australia
- Language: English

Bird in the Wire is a 2001 Australian comedy short film directed by Phillip Donnellon and starring Christine Wilson, Kate Jane Norris, and Valerie Bean.

Bird in the Wire was shown at film festivals in over twenty countries, including the Atlantic Film Festival, the Cannes Film Festival and the Cleveland International Film Festival.

== Premise ==
The film involves three women on a coat-hanger production line. After one sees a bird, she is inspired to make a coathanger in the shape of a bird in flight.

== Cast ==
- Kate Jane Norris as Woman 1
- Christine Wilson as Woman 2
- Valerie Bean as Woman 3

== Accolades ==
- Nominated for Best Cinematography in a Non-Feature Film at the 43rd Australian Film Institute Awards in 2001
- Nominated for Palme d'Or - Best Short Film at the 54th Cannes Film Festival in 2001
