= The Bank (2001 film) =

2001 film by Robert Connolly

- Theatrical release poster
- Directed by: Robert Connolly
- Written by: Robert Connolly
- Produced by: John Maynard
- Starring: David Wenham; Anthony LaPaglia; Sibylla Budd; Steve Rodgers; Mitchell Butel; Mandy McElhinney; Greg Stone; Kazuhiro Muroyama
- Cinematography: Tristan Milani
- Edited by: Nick Meyers
- Music by: Alan John
- Distributed by: Madman Entertainment
- Release date: 6 September 2001
- Running time: 106 minutes
- Country: Australia
- Language: English

The Bank is a 2001 Australian thriller drama film directed by Robert Connolly and starring David Wenham and Anthony LaPaglia.

== Synopsis ==
Jim Doyle (David Wenham) is a maverick mathematician who has devised a formula to predict the fluctuations of the stock market. When he joins O'Reily's fold, he must first prove his loyalty to the "greed is good" ethos.

== Plot ==
The film opens with a group of primary school children in 1977, who have a Victoria State Central Bank representative, Mr.Johnson, who give them lessons on saving and give them the chance to open their first checking account, and telling them that if they will put in any money for 25 years, at the end they will eventually set aside $727,000.

In the present, the Centa Bank's board of directors orders CEO Simon O'Reily to find a way to increase profits. Then he discovers the work of a mathematician, Jim Doyle, whose software B.T.S.E., based on fractal geometry of Benoit Mandelbrot makes it possible to predict stock market trends. Doyle is hired by O'Reily and supplied with the best computer hardware. He befriends Vincent, who had advised O'Reily to hire him, and enters into a relationship with his colleague Michelle Roberts, who views O'Reily's business activities critically.

Meanwhile, the couple Diane and Wayne Davis, who took out a loan in a foreign currency at the bank, become insolvent. The son of the couple is found dead after a meeting with the deliverer of the eviction notice. The Davises hire a lawyer, Stephen O'Connor, to sue the bank on the grounds that they were not informed about the risks of a loan in foreign currency. Invited by O'Reily to a party at his house, Jim takes Michelle, she insults the landlord and the relationship between her and Jim is broken, because he is hiding something and doesn't want to open up with her. O'Reily asks Jim to change his attitude to him and their business and ask him as a proof of loyalty to commit falsely state in court that he was present as an intern in the bank's loan counseling to the Davises and that Wayne Davis was sufficiently informed. That causes the Davises to lose their lawsuit. This also causes the final breakup between Jim and Michelle; the latter then decides to investigate Jim's past. Jim informs his boss that a stock market crash will soon occur. Michelle finds out in Jim's hometown that his real name is not Jim Doyle but Paul Jackson; the bank had terminated his father's credit, whereupon his father committed suicide. A man who watches Michelle on behalf of O'Reily learns the truth and warns O'Reily. O'Reily wants to stop the bank's stock sale in that moment, but Wayne Davis breaks into O'Reily's house to shoot him. O'Reily offers him two million dollars if Davis allows him to make a phone call. Wayne realizes that it would be a very important call for the bank, so he destroys the house's power-box to stop this important phone call, which is intended to warn the bank of Jim's plans, and leaves the estate.

Stock prices initially perform as expected, but then they rise instead of falling. The bank goes bankrupt after losing $50 billion. Jim leaves the country. He meets Michelle for the last time and tells her that the money has partly been lost forever and partly has been "redistributed". Then ask to her to come after him before departure, which she refuses.

The Davises discover at an ATM that their bank balance is $727,000 - an amount referenced in the opening credits. They want to clarify the matter at the neighboring bank branch, but it is one of the many branches that have been closed by O'Reily. They decide to keep the money.

== Cast ==
- David Wenham as Jim Doyle / Paul Jackson
- Anthony LaPaglia as Simon O'Reily
- Steve Rodgers as Wayne Davis
- Mandy McElhinney as Diane Davis
- Mitchell Butel as Stephen O'Connor
- Sibylla Budd as Michelle Roberts
- Greg Stone as Vincent
- Kazuhiro Muroyama as Toshio
- Stephen Leeder as Billy
- Ian Bliss as Executive #1
- Sue Jones as Bank Barrister

== Reception ==
The Bank grossed $2,515,917 at the box office in Australia.

Reviews of the film were mixed. Review aggregator Rotten Tomatoes scored The Bank at 65% from 36 professional reviews (average rating 5.8/10), but 45% from 11 "top critic" reviews (average rating 5.5/10). Australian film review site Urban Cinefile's three reviewers summarized the film as "favourable". The New York Times concluded "As far-fetched as the movie is ... conveys an engaging zest for upper-crust mischief. The two stories come together in the hurtling final lap as Wayne confronts Simon in his country house while Jim puts his perfected program into operation. The upshot is a whopper of an ending that is as silly as it is satisfying." The New York Post gave the film 1.5/4 stars, stating "Despite a crafty premise and a clever kink in the tale that almost saves it, Connolly isn't dexterous enough to achieve the Hitchockian level of suspense the movie needs." The Los Angeles Times stated "Connolly might well have constructed a brisker, more exciting picture with more vivid and involving characters. As it is, the film takes too long to become truly compelling."

== See also ==
- List of films about mathematicians
