= Lantana (film) =

2001 film by Ray Lawrence

- Theatrical release poster
- Directed by: Ray Lawrence
- Screenplay by: Andrew Bovell
- Based on: Speaking In Tongues (play) by Andrew Bovell
- Produced by: Jan Chapman
- Starring: Anthony LaPaglia; Geoffrey Rush; Barbara Hershey; Kerry Armstrong; Rachael Blake; Vince Colosimo; Russell Dykstra; Daniela Farinacci; Peter Phelps; Leah Purcell; Glenn Robbins
- Cinematography: Mandy Walker
- Edited by: Karl Sodersten
- Music by: Paul Kelly
- Production companies: Australian Film Finance Corporation; MBP; New South Wales Film and Television Office; Jan Chapman Films
- Distributed by: Palace Films
- Release dates: 8 July 2001 (Sydney Film Festival); 4 October 2001 (Australia)
- Running time: 121 minutes
- Countries: Australia; Germany
- Language: English
- Box office: $15.7 million

Lantana is a 2001 Australian drama film, directed by Ray Lawrence and starring Anthony LaPaglia, Kerry Armstrong, Geoffrey Rush and Barbara Hershey. It is based on the play Speaking In Tongues by Andrew Bovell, which premiered at Sydney's Griffin Theatre Company. The film won seven AACTA Awards including Best Film and Best Adapted Screenplay.

Lantana is set in suburban Sydney and focuses on the complex relationships between the characters in the film. The central event of the film is the disappearance and death of a woman whose body is shown at the start of the film, but whose identity is not revealed until later. The film's name derives from the plant lantana, an invasive species of shrub prevalent in suburban Sydney, which is attractive on the surface but a tangle of dead wood on the inside. In the film it is a symbol of relationships, marriage in particular. Its tangled branches are a playground and shelter for children but a trap for adults.

== Plot ==
A woman's body is shown in lantana bushes in suburban bushland.

Leon, a policeman, and Jane have sex in a motel. They part, and Leon and his wife, Sonja, attend Latin dance classes that the recently separated Jane is also taking. Leon does not enjoy the classes.

He savagely beats a drug dealer during an arrest. He has emotional issues but refuses to confront or admit to them, while Sonja sees a therapist, Valerie, who has published a book on her daughter's recent murder. She and her husband, John, barely speak; he refers to their marriage as surviving on their grief. Valerie feels threatened by another patient, Patrick, who is having an affair (with a married man), forcing her to confront her marital issues.

Jane purposely encounters Leon outside his station, and they have sex despite his reservations. Nik is upset at the relationship because he is friends with her estranged husband, Pete, who wants to return home. Jane pairs with Sonja in the next salsa class, angering Leon, who ends their arrangement, upsetting Jane. She invites Nik for coffee at Paula's behest, his wife with whom she is friendly, and offers him money as they are struggling. Paula now starts disliking Jane.

Valerie, coming home late, crashes. Stranded, she calls John, unsuccessfully. She hails a vehicle but never makes it home. Leon is the investigating detective and searches her office. Surprised at seeing his wife's file, he takes a recording of their sessions, from which he learns that Sonja would not consider an affair a betrayal, but would if Leon didn't tell her. Leon arrives home late, but Sonja is awake. He asks her about her therapy. They discuss their relationship, and he says he just ended an affair but still loves her. Sonja is upset and feels betrayed. Leon sleeps on the couch. In the morning, Sonja says that he will be lucky if she returns home that night.

Leon goes to John's house as he is the main suspect in his wife's disappearance. Leon starts discussing love, marriage and affairs, but lies to John when asked if he ever had an affair. Leon goes to Jane's house after she calls the police. Jane, late one night, saw Nik arrive home and throw something in the bushes. Later, she finds a woman's shoe there. Leon with colleague Claudia arrive and declare the shoe is Valerie's.

The police arrest Nik and he leaves his children with Jane. Police summon Paula for questioning. Neither Nik nor Paula knows that Jane called the police. Although Paula dislikes Jane, she thanks her for minding their children. The police interrogate Nik, but he refuses to answer questions about Valerie, repeatedly asking for Paula. Afterwards, Nik relaxes and talks with Leon and Paula. Valerie had car trouble and hailed Nik. He agreed to take her home but she panicked when he took a shortcut and jumped out, leaving her shoe. Paula goes to Jane's house for her children, where she tells her that Nik is innocent. Jane asks how she knows, and Paula says he told her. Jane asks if she can spend more time with the kids, but Paula forbids it after seeing how Jane went into her house and tidied it. Leon, Paula, Nik, and John go to where Valerie jumped out of the truck. They find her body, as she had fallen down a ravine. Leon listens to the rest of the therapy tape, where his wife says that she still loved him, and he cries.

Leon returns home and sees his wife outside. Jane salsa dances alone, drinking and smoking, and her husband leaves her. Patrick is pained to see his lover, the man seen in his apartment during Leon's investigation, spending time with his wife and their kids. The movie ends with Sonja and Leon dancing seductively. Leon, who found dancing with his wife difficult, now looks into Sonja's eyes and dances, just as she wanted. Sonja struggles to initially return Leon's gaze but does as the movie ends.

== Cast ==
- Anthony LaPaglia as Detective Leon Zat
- Geoffrey Rush as John Knox
- Barbara Hershey as Valerie Somers
- Kerry Armstrong as Sonja Zat
- Rachael Blake as Jane O'May
- Vince Colosimo as Nik D'Amato
- Russell Dykstra as Neil Toohey
- Daniella Farinacci as Paula D'Amato
- Peter Phelps as Patrick Phelan
- Leah Purcell as Claudia Weis
- Glenn Robbins as Pete O'May
- Lani Tupu as Patrick's lover

== Reception ==
=== Box office ===
Lantana opened on 15 screens in Australia in October 2001. It grossed A$604,004 in its first full week, ranking number 9 for the week. It expanded to 40 screens on 18 October. It opened on 14 December 2001 in North America in 6 theaters. In the US, it grossed $66,701 with an average of $11,116 per theater and ranking number 39 at the box office. Its widest release was 108 theaters and it ended up earning $4,623,189. The film earned $11,124,261 internationally (including $6,125,907 in Australia) for a total of $15,747,450.

=== Critical response ===
Lantana received positive reviews from critics and has a score of 90% on Rotten Tomatoes based on 106 reviews with an average rating of 7.38/10. The critical consensus states "Lantana is an intricately plotted character study that quietly shines with authenticity." The film also has a score of 84 out of 100 on Metacritic based on 29 critics.

Writer and critic Roger Ebert compared the film to Short Cuts and Magnolia in terms of how it developed the connections between the lives of strangers. It premiered in the UK on Channel 4 in December 2006. British critic Philip French described the film as a "thoughtful, gripping movie" based around the themes of "trust in its various forms, betrayal, forgiveness and grief".

=== Accolades ===
Award	Category	Subject	Result
AACTA Awards (2001 AFI Awards)	Best Film	Jan Chapman	Won
AACTA Awards (2001 AFI Awards)	Best Director	Ray Lawrence	Won
AACTA Awards (2001 AFI Awards)	Best Adapted Screenplay	Andrew Bovell	Won
AACTA Awards (2001 AFI Awards)	Harpers Bazaar AFI Screenwriting Prize	Andrew Bovell	Won
AACTA Awards (2001 AFI Awards)	Best Actor	Anthony LaPaglia	Won
AACTA Awards (2001 AFI Awards)	Best Actress	Kerry Armstrong	Won
AACTA Awards (2001 AFI Awards)	Best Supporting Actor	Vince Colosimo	Won
AACTA Awards (2001 AFI Awards)	Best Supporting Actress	Rachael Blake	Won
AACTA Awards (2001 AFI Awards)	Best Supporting Actress	Daniela Farinacci	Nominated
AACTA Awards (2001 AFI Awards)	Best Editing	Karl Sodersten	Nominated
AACTA Awards (2001 AFI Awards)	Best Original Music Score	Paul Kelly	Nominated
AACTA Awards (2001 AFI Awards)	Best Sound	Syd Butterworth	Nominated
AACTA Awards (2001 AFI Awards)	Best Sound	Andrew Plain	Nominated
AACTA Awards (2001 AFI Awards)	Best Sound	Robert Sullivan	Nominated
AACTA Awards (2001 AFI Awards)	Best Production Design	Kim Buddee	Nominated
AACTA Awards (2001 AFI Awards)	Best Costume Design	Margot Wilson	Nominated
ARIA Music Award	Best Original Soundtrack Album	Paul Kelly	Won
Australian Cinematographers Society	Award of Distinction — Feature Productions Cinema	Mandy Walker	Won
ASSG Award	Best Achievement in Sound for a Feature Film — Location Sound Recording	Syd Butterworth	Won
AWGIE Award	Best Writing in a Feature Film — Adapted	Andrew Bovell	Won
BIFA	Best Foreign Independent Film — English Language	Jan Chapman	Won
Festival du Film Policier de Cognac	Critics Award	Ray Lawrence	Won
Festival du Film Policier de Cognac	Special Jury Prize	Ray Lawrence	Won
Durban International Film Festival	Best Actor	Anthony LaPaglia	Won
FCCA Awards	Best Film	Jan Chapman	Won
FCCA Awards	Best Director	Ray Lawrence	Nominated
FCCA Awards	Best Screenplay — Adapted	Andrew Bovell	Won
FCCA Awards	Best Actor — Male	Anthony LaPaglia	Won
FCCA Awards	Best Actor — Female	Kerry Armstrong	Won
FCCA Awards	Best Supporting Actor — Male	Vince Colosimo	Nominated
FCCA Awards	Best Supporting Actor — Male	Peter Phelps	Nominated
FCCA Awards	Best Supporting Actor — Female	Rachael Blake	Nominated
FCCA Awards	Best Supporting Actor — Female	Daniela Farinacci	Won
FCCA Awards	Best Supporting Actor — Female	Leah Purcell	Nominated
FCCA Awards	Best Cinematography	Mandy Walker	Nominated
FCCA Awards	Best Editing	Karl Sodersten	Nominated
FCCA Awards	Best Music Score	Paul Kelly	Nominated
Ft. Lauderdale International Film Festival	Jury Award for Best Film	Ray Lawrence	Won
Ft. Lauderdale International Film Festival	Jury Award for Best Director	Ray Lawrence	Won
Ft. Lauderdale International Film Festival	Jury Award for Best Script	Andrew Bovell	Won
Ft. Lauderdale International Film Festival	Jury Award for Best Ensemble Cast		Won
Inside Film Awards	Box Office Achievement		Won
Inside Film Awards	Best Feature Film	Jan Chapman	Won
Inside Film Awards	Best Feature Film	Ray Lawrence	Won
Inside Film Awards	Best Direction	Ray Lawrence	Won
Inside Film Awards	Best Script	Andrew Bovell	Won
Inside Film Awards	Best Actor	Anthony LaPaglia	Won
Inside Film Awards	Best Actress	The ensemble female cast	Won
Inside Film Awards	Best Cinematography	Mandy Walker	Nominated
Inside Film Awards	Best Music	Paul Kelly	Nominated
Inside Film Awards	Best Sound Design	Andrew Plain	Nominated
Italian National Syndicate of Film Journalists	Silver Ribbon for Best Foreign Director	Ray Lawrence	Nominated
London Film Critics' Circle Awards	Film of the Year	Jan Chapman	Nominated
London Film Critics' Circle Awards	Screenwriter of the Year	Andrew Bovell	Won
London Film Critics' Circle Awards	Actress of the Year	Kerry Armstrong	Nominated
Melbourne International Film Festival Award	Most Popular Feature Film	Ray Lawrence	Won
National Board of Review, USA	Special Recognition for Excellence in Filmmaking		Won
San Sebastián International Film Festival	Golden Seashell	Ray Lawrence	Nominated

== See also ==
- Cinema of Australia
