= Ray Lawrence (film director) =

Australian film director (born 1948)

- Born: 1948 (age 77–78); London, England
- Occupation: Film director
- Years active: 1985-present

Ray Lawrence (born 1948) is an Australian film director, best known for his 2001 film Lantana.

== Overview ==
All his films are made in Australia with predominantly Australian casts. He has made only three films in nearly four decades, yet they have been some of the most critically acclaimed works in Australian cinema during that time. He is famous for his one-take shoots and use of natural light. He makes commercials in between films.

== Early life ==
Lawrence was born in London, England, the son of a painter who painted the royal coaches at Buckingham Palace, and later spray painted London buses for double the salary. He moved to Australia with his family in 1958 at age 11 and they settled in Victor Harbor, South Australia after spending three years in a migrant hostel in Gawler. When he left school he moved to Sydney and began working in advertising. He worked for a number of years in London producing commercials. Then he returned home, established Window Productions with Glen Thomas, and became one of Australia's top directors of TV commercials.

== Career ==
Lawrence's work as a feature film director has been noted for its focus on interpersonal relationships and the complexities of human interaction. Over a career spanning more than 25 years, he directed three feature films, each exploring themes of related to communication, relationships and everyday life. Critics have highlighted his emphasis on character-driven storytelling and his portrayal of personal interactions within realistic settings.

His second feature, Lantana (2001), is one of the highest grossing Australian films ever made, winning critical and popular recognition including Best film, Australian Film Institute (AFI) Awards. Examining human relationships and the notion of trust, the film weaves the mysterious disappearance of a wealthy psychiatrist across the fabric of three Australian families, with each family representative of a different social class existent in contemporary Australian society.

== Private life ==
His son, Ben Lawrence, is also a film director.

== Filmography ==
- Bliss (1985), based on the Peter Carey novel of the same name
- Lantana (2001), Andrew Bovell's adaptation of his play, Speaking In Tongues, which won seven AFI Awards
- Jindabyne (2006), based on Raymond Carver's short story, So Much Water So Close to Home
