= AACTA Award for Best Television Drama Series =

Australian television award

The AACTA Award for Best Television Drama Series is a television award handed out by the Australian Academy of Cinema and Television Arts (AACTA). It was previously awarded by the Australian Film Institute (AFI), from 1991 to 2010, and will continue to be presented by the Academy. It is awarded to a dramatic television series of no fewer than five episodes. It can be a series of self-contained stories which can be screened in any order or a number of interweaving and overlapping plots continuing from one episode to the next.

Between 1991 and 2001, only individual episodes were awarded. The award has changed its name several times, and between 1993 and 2001, it became two separate categories; from 1991 to 1992, the award was called Best Episode in a Television Drama, Series or Serial; from 1993 to 2001 the award was split into Best Episode in a Television Drama Series and Best Episode in a Television Drama Serial and; from 1998 to 2001 Best Episode in a Drama Serial was changed to Best Episode in a Television Drama Series (Long). In 2002 the awards was combined to make Best Drama Series.

The award is usually presented to the producer(s) of a series, but between 1991 and 2001, the award went to the producer of a specific episode. Over the years, ABC have won sixteen of twenty-nine awards.^{[A]} Home and Away have won four awards, more than any other television programme. If the Best Episode categories aren't taken into account, then Home and Away's wins are discounted and Love My Way would have the record of three.

== Rules ==
Potential nominees must submit two episodes from a drama series, which will be judged as a single entry, and a fee of A$1,125. The television program must be produced and broadcast in Australia for free-to-air or subscription television channels, but excludes broadcasts on community television.

== Winners and nominees ==
=== Best Episode in a Television Drama Series or Serial (1991–1992) ===
Year	Program	Network	Episode	Producer(s)
1991 (34th)
1991 (34th)	Embassy (series 2)	ABC	Episode 1: "A Human Dimension"	Alan Hardy
1991 (34th)	Police Rescue (season 1)	ABC	Episode 2: "Angel After Hours"	Sandra Levy and John Edwards
1991 (34th)	Police Rescue (season 1)	ABC	Episode 13: "By The Book"	Sandra Levy and John Edwards
1991 (34th)	Boys from the Bush (season 1)	Seven Network	Episode 8	Jane Scott and Verity Lambert
1992 (35th)
1992 (35th)	Phoenix (season 1)	ABC	Episode 13:"Hard Ball"	Bill Hughes
1992 (35th)	Police Rescue (season 2)	ABC	Episode 2: "Off The Track"	Sandra Levy and John Edwards
1992 (35th)	Embassy (season 3)	ABC	Episode 10: "Crisis of Confidence"	Mark Callan
1992 (35th)	Phoenix (season 1)	ABC	Episode 8: "Fond Memories"	Bill Hughes

=== Best Episode in a Television Drama Series (1993–2001) ===
Year	Program	Network	Episode	Producer(s)
1993 (36th)
1993 (36th)	Phoenix^{[D]}	ABC	"Under Siege"	Bill Hughes
1993 (36th)	Police Rescue	ABC	"Whirlwind"	Sandra Levy, John Edwards
1993 (36th)	G.P.	ABC	"Exposed"	Bruce Best
1993 (36th)	Police Rescue	ABC	"Lifeline"	Sandra Levy, John Edwards
1994 (37th)
1994 (37th)	The Damnation of Harvey McHugh^{[E]}^{[D]}	ABC	"Hey St Jude"	Sue Masters
1994 (37th)	Heartland^{[E]}^{[D]}	ABC	"Episode 7"	Bruce Best, Penny Chapman, Phaedon Vass
1994 (37th)	G.P.	ABC	"Double Bind"	Peter Andrikidis
1994 (37th)	Police Rescue	ABC	"Double Illusion"	Sandra Levy, John Edwards
1995 (38th)
1995 (38th)	Frontline^{[D]}	ABC	"The Siege"	Rob Sitch, Santo Cilauro, Jane Kennedy, Tom Gleisner
1995 (38th)	Frontline	ABC	"The Art of Gentle Persuasion"	Rob Sitch, Santo Cilauro, Jane Kennedy, Tom Gleisner
1995 (38th)	Janus	ABC	"Not On The Merits"	Bill Hughes
1995 (38th)	Janus	ABC	"Without Consent"	Bill Hughes
1996 (39th)
1996 (39th)	Frontline^{[D]}	ABC	"Keeping Up Appearances"	Rob Sitch, Santo Cilauro, Jane Kennedy, Tom Gleisner
1996 (39th)	G.P.	ABC	"Ceremony Of Innocence"	Peter Andrikidis
1996 (39th)	G.P.	ABC	"Sing Me A Lullaby"	Peter Andrikidis
1996 (39th)	Police Rescue	ABC	"Tomorrow Never Knows"	John Edward
1997 (40th)
1997 (40th)	Frontline^{[D]}	ABC	"Epitaph"	Rob Sitch, Santo Cilauro, Jane Kennedy, Tom Gleisner
1997 (40th)	Frontline	ABC	"The Shadow We Cast"	Rob Sitch, Santo Cilauro, Jane Kennedy, Tom Gleisner
1997 (40th)	Good Guys Bad Guys	Nine Network	"One Point Eight Million Reasons to Change Your Name: Part 1"	Roger Le Mesurier, Roger Simpson; Ros Tatarka
1997 (40th)	Good Guys Bad Guys	Nine Network	"One Point Eight Million Reasons to Change Your Name: Part 2"	Roger Le Mesurier, Roger Simpson, Ros Tatarka
1998 (41st)
1998 (41st)	Wildside^{[D]}	ABC	"Episode 16"	Steve Knapman
1998 (41st)	Blue Heelers	Seven Network	"Collateral Damage"	Ricardo Pillizzeri
1998 (41st)	Good Guys, Bad Guys	Nine Network	"Dog People"	Roger Le Mesurier, Roger Simpson, John Wild
1998 (41st)	SeaChange	ABC	"Stormy Weather"	Sally Ayre-Smith
1999 (42nd)
1999 (42nd)	Wildside^{[D]}	ABC	"Episode 59"	Steve Knapman
1999 (42nd)	SeaChange	ABC	"Law and Order"	Sally Ayre-Smith
1999 (42nd)	SeaChange	ABC	"Manna From Heaven"	Sally Ayre-Smith
1999 (42nd)	SeaChange	ABC	"Playing With Fire"	Sally Ayre-Smith
2000 (43rd)
2000 (43rd)	Grass Roots^{[D]}	ABC	"The Whole Year"	John Eastway
2000 (43rd)	Grass Roots	ABC	"Late July 4.00pm to 10.30pm"	John Eastway
2000 (43rd)	Grass Roots	ABC	"Late September"	John Eastway
2000 (43rd)	SeaChange	ABC	"Hungi Jury"	Sally Ayre-Smith
2001 (44th)
2001 (44th)	SeaChange ^{[D]}	ABC	"I Name Thee Bay of Pearls"	Sally Ayre-Smith
2001 (44th)	The Games	ABC	"Solar"	John Clarke, Ross Stevenson, Mark Ruse
2001 (44th)	Love Is a Four Letter Word	ABC	"Split"	Rosemary Blight, Tim Pye
2001 (44th)	SeaChange	ABC	"Half Life"	Sally Ayre-Smith
2001 (44th)	The Secret Life of Us	Network Ten	"The Butterfly Effect"	John Edwards, Amanda Higgs

=== Best Episode in a Television Drama Serial (1993–2001) ===
Year	Program	Network	Episode	Producer(s)
1993 (36th)
1993 (36th)	Home and Away^{[C]}	Seven Network	"Episode #1222"	Andrew Howie
1993 (36th)	Home And Away	Seven Network	Episode 1252 (Seven Network)	Andrew Howie
1993 (36th)	Neighbours	Network Ten	Episode 1859	Margaret Slarke, Sally-Anne Kerr
1993 (36th)	Home And Away	Seven Network	Episode 1251	Andrew Howie
1995 (38th)
1995 (38th)	Home and Away^{[C]}	Seven Network	"Episode #1705"	Andrew Howie, Russell Webb
1995 (38th)	Echo Point	Network Ten	Episode 29	Sandra Levy, John Edwards
1995 (38th)	Home And Away	Seven Network	Episode 1683	John Holmes, Russell Webb
1997 (40th)
1997 (40th)	Neighbours^{[C]}	Network Ten	"Episode #2842"	Peter Dodds
1997 (40th)	Home and Away	Seven Network	"The Earthquake"	Russell Webb
1997 (40th)	Neighbours	Network Ten	"Episode #2911"	Peter Dodds
1998 (41st)
1998 (41st)	Home and Away^{[C]}	Seven Network	"Episode #2197"	Russell Webb
1998 (41st)	All Saints	Seven Network	"Give and Take"	Jo Porter
1998 (41st)	All Saints	Seven Network	"Revelations"	Jo Porter
1998 (41st)	Home and Away	Seven Network	"Episode #2413"	Russell Webb
1999 (42nd)
1999 (42nd)	All Saints^{[C]}	Seven Network	"Head to Head"	Jo Porter
1999 (42nd)	Home and Away	Seven Network	"Episode #2646"	Russell Webb
1999 (42nd)	Neighbours	Network Ten	"Episode #3388 "	Peter Dodds
1999 (42nd)	Neighbours	Network Ten	"Episode #3389 "	Peter Dodds
2000 (43rd)
2000 (43rd)	All Saints^{[C]}	Seven Network	"Valley of the Shadows: Part 1"	Jo Porter
2000 (43rd)	All Saints	Seven Network	"Dead on Time"	Jo Porter
2000 (43rd)	Something in the Air	ABC	"Movers and Shakers"	Roger Le Mesurier, Roger Simpson, Ros Tatarka
2000 (43rd)	Something in the Air	ABC	"We Will Remember Them"	Roger Le Mesurier, Roger Simpson, Ros Tatarka
2001 (44th)
2001 (44th)	Something in the Air^{[C]}	ABC	"That One Defining Moment"	Roger Le Mesurier, Roger Simpson, Alan Hardy
2001 (44th)	All Saints	Seven Network	"The Sign"	Di Drew
2001 (44th)	Something in the Air	ABC	"Into Thy Hands"	Roger Le Mesurier, Roger Simpson, Alan Hardy
2001 (44th)	Something in the Air	ABC	"Living in the Past"	Roger Le Mesurier, Roger Simpson, Alan Hardy

=== Best Television Drama Series (2002-current) ===
Year	Program	Network	Producer(s)
2002 (45th)
2002 (45th)	Kath & Kim (series 1)	ABC	Mark Ruse
2002 (45th)	All Saints (season 5)	Seven Network	Di Drew
2002 (45th)	MDA (series 1)	ABC	Greg Haddrick
2002 (45th)	The Secret Life of Us	Network Ten	John Edwards and Amanda Higgs
2003 (46th)
2003 (46th)	MDA (series 2)	ABC	Denny Lawrence
2003 (46th)	Grass Roots (series 2)	ABC	John Eastway
2003 (46th)	Stingers (series 6)	Nine Network	Roger Le Mesurier, Roger Simpson and John Wild
2003 (46th)	The Secret Life of Us (series 3)	Network Ten	Amanda Higgs
2004 (47th)
2004 (47th)	Stingers (series 8)	Nine Network	Roger Le Mesurier, Roger Simpson and John Wild
2004 (47th)	McLeod's Daughters (season 4)	Nine Network	Susan Bower and Posie Graeme-Evans
2004 (47th)	MDA	ABC	Denny Lawrence
2004 (47th)	White Collar Blue (series 2)	Network Ten	Steve Knapman and Kris Wyld
2005 (48th)
2005 (48th)	Love My Way (series 1)	Fox8	John Edwards and Claudia Karvan
2005 (48th)	All Saints (season 8)	Seven Network	Maryanne Carroll
2005 (48th)	Blue Heelers (season 12)	Seven Network	Gus Howard and David Clarke
2005 (48th)	MDA (series 3)	ABC	Denny Lawrence
2006 (49th)
2006 (49th)	Love My Way (series 2)	W	John Edwards, Claudia Karvan and Jacquelin Perske
2006 (49th)	All Saints (season 9)	Seven Network	MaryAnne Carroll
2006 (49th)	Blue Heelers (season 13)	Seven Network	Gus Howard and David Clarke
2006 (49th)	McLeod's Daughters (season 6)	Nine Network	Posie Graeme-Evans and Karl Zwicky
2007 (50th)
2007 (50th)	Love My Way (series 3)	Showtime	John Edwards and Claudia Karvan
2007 (50th)	All Saints (season 10)	Seven Network	MaryAnne Carroll and Bill Hughes
2007 (50th)	Dangerous	Fox8	John Edwards and Imogen Banks
2008 (51st)
2008 (51st)	Underbelly	Nine Network	Greg Haddrick and Brenda Pam
2008 (51st)	City Homicide (series 2)	Seven Network	MaryAnne Carroll
2008 (51st)	Rush (series 1)	Network Ten	John Edwards and Mimi Butler
2008 (51st)	Satisfaction (series 1)	Showcase	Andrew Walker and Roger Simpson
2009 (52nd)
2009 (52nd)	East West 101 (season 2)	SBS One	Kristine Wyld and Steve Knapman
2009 (52nd)	Packed to the Rafters (season 1)	Seven Network	Jo Porter
2009 (52nd)	Satisfaction (season 2)	Showcase	John Edwards and Mimi Butler
2009 (52nd)	Underbelly: A Tale of Two Cities	Nine Network	Greg Haddrick and Brenda Pam
2010 (53rd)
2010 (53rd)	Rush (series 3)	Network Ten	John Edwards and Mimi Butler
2010 (53rd)	The Circuit (season 2)	SBS	Ross Hutchens and Colin South
2010 (53rd)	Spirited (series 1)	W	John Edwards, Claudia Karvan and Jacquelin Perske
2010 (53rd)	Tangle (season 2)	Showcase	John Edwards and Imogen Banks
2011 (1st)
2011 (1st)	East West 101 (season 3)	SBS One	Steve Knapman and Kris Wyld
2011 (1st)	Offspring (season 2)	Network Ten	John Edwards and Imogen Banks
2011 (1st)	Rake	ABC1	Ian Collie; Peter Duncan and Richard Roxburgh
2011 (1st)	Spirited (series 2)	W	Claudia Karvan and Jacquelin Perske
2012 (2nd)
2012 (2nd)	Puberty Blues	Network Ten	John Edwards and Imogen Banks
2012 (2nd)	Rake (season 2)	ABC1	Ian Collie, Peter Duncan and Richard Roxburgh
2012 (2nd)	Redfern Now	ABC1	Darren Dale and Miranda Dear
2012 (2nd)	Tangle (season 3)	Showcase	John Edwards and Imogen Banks
2013 (3rd)
2013 (3rd)	Redfern Now (series 2)	ABC1	Darren Dale and Miranda Dear
2013 (3rd)	Offspring (season 4)	Network Ten	John Edwards and Imogen Banks
2013 (3rd)	Serangoon Road	ABC1	Paul Barron and Nick North
2013 (3rd)	Wentworth (series 1)	Soho	Jo Porter and Amanda Crittenden
2014 (4th)
2014 (4th)	The Code	ABC	Shelley Birse, David Maher and David Taylor
2014 (4th)	Janet King	ABC	Karl Zwicky and Lisa Scott
2014 (4th)	Puberty Blues (season 2)	Network Ten	John Edwards and Imogen Banks
2014 (4th)	Rake (series 3)	ABC	Ian Collie, Peter Duncan and Richard Roxburgh
2015 (5th)
2015 (5th)	Glitch	ABC	Tony Ayres, Louise Fox and Ewan Burnett
2015 (5th)	Love Child (season 2)	Nine Network	Tom Hoffie
2015 (5th)	Miss Fisher's Murder Mysteries (series 3)	ABC	Deb Cox and Fiona Eagger
2015 (5th)	Wentworth (season 3)	SoHo	Jo Porter and Amanda Crittenden
2016 (6th)
2016 (6th)	Wentworth (season 4)	SoHo	Pino Amenta and Jo Porter
2016 (6th)	The Code	ABC	David Maher, David Taylor, Shelley Birse and Diane Haddon
2016 (6th)	Jack Irish	ABC	Ian Collie and Andrew Knight
2016 (6th)	Rake	ABC	Ian Collie, Peter Duncan and Richard Roxburgh
2017 (7th)
2017 (7th)	Top Of The Lake: China Girl	Foxtel/BBC First	Emile Sherman, Iain Canning, Jane Campion, Philippa Campbell and Libby Sharpe
2017 (7th)	Cleverman	ABC	Rosemary Blight, Sharon Lark, Ryan Griffen and Jane Allen
2017 (7th)	Glitch	ABC	Louise Fox, Tony Ayres, Julie Eckersley and Chris Oliver-Taylor
2017 (7th)	Wentworth (season 5)	Foxtel/Showcase	Jo Porter and Pino Amenta
2017 (7th)	Janet King - Playing Advantage	ABC	Lisa Scott, Karl Zwicky, Greg Haddrick
2018 (8th)
2018 (8th)	Mystery Road	ABC	David Jowsey and Greer Simpkin
2018 (8th)	Jack Irish	ABC	Ian Collie, Matt Cameron, Andrew Knight
2018 (8th)	Rake	ABC	Ian Collie, Peter Duncan, Richard Roxburgh
2018 (8th)	Mr Inbetween	Foxtel/Showcase	Michele Bennett
2018 (8th)	Wentworth (season 6)	Foxtel/Showcase	Jo Porter and Pino Amenta
2019 (9th)
2019 (9th)	Total Control	ABC	Darren Dale, Miranda Dear and Rachel Griffiths
2019 (9th)	Mr Inbetween	Foxtel/Showcase	Michele Bennett
2019 (9th)	Bloom	Stan	David Maher, David Taylor, Glen Dolman and Sue Seeary
2019 (9th)	Secret City: Under the Eagle	Foxtel/Showcase	Stephen Corvini, Penny Chapman, Matt Cameron and Penny Win
2019 (9th)	Wentworth (season 7)	Foxtel/Showcase	Jo Porter and Pino Amenta
2020 (10th)
2020 (10th)	Mystery Road	ABC	David Jowsey and Greer Simpkin
2020 (10th)	Bloom	Stan	David Maher, David Taylor, Glen Dolman and Sue Seeary
2020 (10th)	Doctor Doctor	Nine Network	Ian Collie, Ally Henville, Keith Thompson and Rodger Corser
2020 (10th)	Halifax: Retribution	Nine Network	Roger Simpson and Louisa Kors
2020 (10th)	The Heights	ABC	Warren Clarke, Peta Astbury-Bulsara, Debbie Lee and Que Minh Luu
2020 (10th)	Wentworth	Foxtel	Jo Porter and Pino Amenta
2021 (11th)
2021 (11th)	The Newsreader	ABC	Joanna Werner and Michael Lucas
2021 (11th)	Clickbait	Netflix	Tony Ayres, Joanna Werner, Tom Hoffie and David Heyman
2021 (11th)	Jack Irish	ABC	Ian Collie, Matt Cameron, Jo Rooney, Andrew Knight and Rob Gibson
2021 (11th)	Mr Inbetween	Foxtel	Michele Bennett
2021 (11th)	Total Control	ABC	Darren Dale, Rachel Griffiths, Stuart Page and Erin Bretherton
2021 (11th)	Wakefield	ABC	Kristen Dunphy, Sam Meikle, Jason Burrows, Chloe Rickard, Ally Henville, Shay Spencer and Alex Mitchell
2021 (11th)	Wentworth	Foxtel	Pino Amenta
2022 (12th)
2022 (12th)	Mystery Road: Origin	ABC	Greer Simpkin and David Jowsey
2022 (12th)	Bump	Stan	Dan Edwards, John Edwards, Claudia Karvan and Kelsey Munro
2022 (12th)	Heartbreak High	Netflix	Carly Heaton, Sarah Freeman and Chris Oliver-Taylor
2022 (12th)	Love Me	BINGE/Foxtel	Hamish Lewis, Michael Brooks, Angie Fielder and Polly Staniford
2022 (12th)	The Tourist	Stan	Lisa Scott, Harry Williams, Jack Williams, Christopher Aird and Chris Sweeney
2022 (12th)	Wolf Like Me	Stan	Steve Hutensky, Jodi Matterson, Bruna Papandrea and Abe Forsythe

== See also ==
- AACTA Award for Best Television Comedy Series
- AACTA Awards

== Notes ==
A: In 1993, and then from 1995 to 2001, the award was split into two categories: Best Episode in a Television Drama, Series or Serial and Best Episode in a Television Drama Serial (the latter was changed to Best Episode in a Television Drama Series (Long) in 1998). This means that two awards were presented for both categories each year, bringing the total of awards presented to twenty-nine.
B: Awarded for Best Episode in a Television Drama, Series or Serial.
C: Awarded for Best Episode in a Television Drama Serial (1993–1997). The category then changed to Best Episode in a Television Drama Series (Long) (1998–2001).
D: Awarded for Best Episode in a Television Drama Series.
E^{1} ^{2} : The Damnation of Harvey McHugh and Heartland were joint winners for Best Episode in a Television Drama Series at the 1994 awards.
