= East of Everything =

- Genre: Drama
- Written by: Deb Cox; Roger Monk
- Directed by: Stuart McDonald; Matthew Saville
- Starring: Richard Roxburgh; Susie Porter; Tom Long; Gia Carides; Steve Bisley; Liana Cornell; Nick Tate; Craig Hall
- Theme music composer: Greg J. Walker
- Opening theme: "A Most Peculiar Place"
- Composer: Greg J. Walker
- Country of origin: Australia
- Original language: English
- No. of seasons: 2
- No. of episodes: 13

Production
- Executive producers: Miranda Dear; Fiona Eagger
- Producers: Fiona Eagger; Deb Cox
- Production locations: Byron Bay, New South Wales
- Running time: 60 minutes per episode
- Production company: Twenty 20 Pty Ltd

Original release
- Network: ABC1
- Release: 30 March 2008 – 5 September 2009

East of Everything is an Australian drama series set in the Northern Rivers region of New South Wales which screened in 2008–2009 on the ABC.

== Synopsis ==
The story initially revolves around Art Watkins (Richard Roxburgh), a globe-trotting travel writer who returns home for his mother's funeral to a neglected resort town, Broken Bay, on the easternmost point of Australia, where he is challenged by a crooked local council, his brother Vance who is trying to cheat him out of his inheritance, his first love who broke his heart when he was a teenager and the son he hasn't seen in ten years.

As the series progresses, the life journeys of other characters are interwoven, including the unexpected return of Gerry (Nick Tate), estranged father of the Watkins brothers (and original constructor of the resort).

== Background ==
While season one is mainly about the initial ensemble characters coming to terms with, and resolving some of their problems, in season two some new characters are introduced and, with many demons disposed of, a somewhat lighter tone is permitted to prevail, although a range of serious themes is still addressed.

In addition to its principal themes of families, relationships, values and small-town politics, the series pays homage to the relaxed beach lifestyle, adjacent rainforest, "hippy vibe", and potential conflicts with developers associated with its principal setting.

According to The Age, the series creators "see their multi-generational ensemble as characters bruised by life, some seeking refuge, most requiring restoration. Reaching Broken Bay, they have come as far as they can and must turn back to face their demons, confront the problems they have endeavoured to escape." Of the initial principal characters (the Watkins brothers), series creator Cox says, "There's a group of men, children in the 1970s, who were left by their fathers and left wondering how to be men... Divorce became easier in the 70s and there were more family break-ups. Men grew up as small children with the breadwinner around and then became confused when their own fathers took a different path... We were kind of interested in the idea of fatherhood and brothers, and men's relationships to each other."

== Cast ==
- Richard Roxburgh as Art Watkins
- Susie Porter as Eve Pritchard
- Tom Long as Vance Watkins
- Gia Carides as Melanie Freedman
- Steve Bisley as Terry Adams
- Kathryn Beck as Lizzy Dellora
- Valerie Bader as Bev Flick
- Craig Stott as Josh Watkins
- Liana Cornell as Rebecca
- Imogen Annesley as Suzy Burns
- Mouche Phillips as Sandy
- Tom Budge as Dale
- Damien Garvey as Owen
- Errol O'Neill as Len
- Glen Shea as Edgar
- Fletcher Humphrys as Jai
- Leah Vandenberg as Lara
- Tracy Mann as Rosemary de Jong (season 2)
- Nick Tate as Gerry Watkins (season 2)
- Craig Hall as Carter Smith (season 2)
- Christine Amor as Matron (season 2, 2 episodes)

== Episode list ==
=== Season 1 ===
No. overall	No. in season	Title	Directed by	Written by	Original release date	Aus. viewers (millions)
1	1	"Gross National Happiness"	Stuart McDonald	Deb Cox	30 March 2008	1.006
2	2	"Voila, Baby"	Stuart McDonald	Roger Monk	6 April 2008	0.819
3	3	"The Shining Path"	Stuart McDonald	Deb Cox	13 April 2008	0.743
4	4	"No Way To Nirvana"	Matthew Saville	Roger Monk	20 April 2008	0.717
5	5	"Save Me Some Scones"	Matthew Saville	Deb Cox	27 April 2008	0.655
6	6	"Aesthetic My Arse"	Matthew Saville	Roger Monk	3 May 2008	0.781

=== Season 2 ===
No. overall	No. in season	Title	Directed by	Written by	Original release date	Aus. viewers (millions)
7	1	"Weather Man"	Stuart McDonald	Deb Cox	25 July 2009	0.794
8	2	"Cumin Get It"	Stuart McDonald	Roger Monk	1 August 2009	0.749
9	3	"The Golden Rule"	Tony Tilse	Deb Cox	8 August 2009	0.689
10	4	"Secret and Lies"	Tony Tilse	Roger Monk	15 August 2009	0.628
11	5	"Venus Rising"	Tony Tilse	Roger Monk	22 August 2009	0.615
12	6	"Homeward Bound"	Ian Watson	Deb Cox	29 August 2009	0.644
13	7	"Community Chest"	Ian Watson	Roger Monk	5 September 2009	0.619

Detailed plot summaries for all episodes of both series are available here and here.

== Production details ==
The series, consisting of two seasons, was produced by Deb Cox (SeaChange), Fiona Eagger (CrashBurn) and Roger Monk (The Secret Life of Us). Season one had six episodes, with the show airing on Sunday nights at 8.30pm. It premiered on Sunday, 30 March 2008, and the season finale aired on Sunday, 4 May 2008. Season two had seven episodes, with the show airing on Saturday nights at 7.30pm. It premiered on Saturday, 25 July 2009. Nick Tate joined the cast for the season.

=== Filming locations ===
The fictional town of Broken Bay in which the show is set, is loosely based on Byron Bay, on the northern New South Wales coast, where the majority of filming took place. The name 'Broken Bay' was chosen as a combination of the names of Byron Bay and Broken Head, the next headland down the coast.

For season two, additional filming locations depicting Broken Bay included other 'hippy' towns in the Northern Rivers region of northern New South Wales – notably Nimbin and Mullumbimby.

The run down fictional 'Far Out East' resort where much of the action is set, was a specially constructed set on the site of the future Byron Beach Resort situated on Belongil Beach. The inspiration for Far Out East was in part from backpacker accommodation associated with the former Piggery site and music venue in Byron Bay, which still exists under its current (2021) name, The Arts Factory Lodge.

=== Music ===
The contribution of the incidental music (featuring many local and generally less well-known artists, as well as occasionally unusual instrumentation) to the story and the sense of place, is discussed in an article in Screen Sound by Liz Giuffre, who points out that these attributes reinforce the "somewhat exotic location" used for the setting.

== DVD and CD releases ==
Both seasons were released by the Australian Broadcasting Corporation on DVD for home viewing, Series 1 in 2008 and Series 2 in 2009, accompanied by various extras on each 2-disc set, while the soundtracks for both series were also available on CD. At the ARIA Music Awards of 2009 the soundtrack was nominated for ARIA Award for Best Original Soundtrack, Cast or Show Album.

== See also ==
- List of Australian television series
- List of programs broadcast by ABC (Australian TV network)
