= Georgina Naidu =

Australian actress

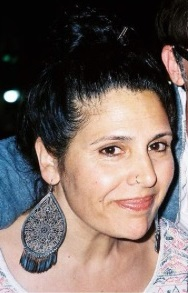
- Naidu in 2017
- Education: St Martin's Youth Theatre; Prahran College; Victorian College of the Arts; La Trobe University
- Occupations: Actress; stage writer; university lecturer
- Years active: 1990–present

Georgina Naidu is an Australian actress, stage writer and university lecturer. From Melbourne, she began acting from an early age and completed her professional training with the Victorian College of the Arts in 1994. She began her film career taking small roles, such as Mary in the 1998 film Dead Letter Office. Her television career has also been formed of many guest roles in Australian drama series. Her role as Phrani Gupta in the 1998 Australian Broadcasting Corporation drama SeaChange heightened her profile. The actress continued to play numerous roles in film and television over the two decades that followed. She also studied law and became a university lecturer.

Naidu has often concentrated on theatre work and has starred in many theatrical productions. She also writes plays and in 2005 she opened her one-woman show, Yellowfeather, at the Sydney Opera House. Her show is an autobiographical piece that focuses on her life and went on to tour internationally. In 2011, she appeared as Georgina in the drama At Home With Julia and the show's cast won a 2012 Equity Ensemble Award. In 2017, Naidu secured the main role of Helena Chatterjee in Newton's Law, which aired on the ABC network. Other ongoing roles included Marla in The Time of Our Lives and Toni Chadha in the drama series Playing for Keeps. In 2019, Naidu reprised her role in SeaChange and continued appearing in numerous Australian drama series.

== Early life ==
Naidu is from Melbourne and has Anglo-Indian ancestry. Naidu has claimed that her family knew she wanted to act following an impromptu dance piece at the age of three. She took part in amateur acting from 1984 until 1991 with the St Martin's Youth Theatre in South Yarra, Victoria. Naidu went to the Victorian College of the Arts and graduated in 1994. She had also trained at Prahran College of Performing Arts in 1991. One of her early roles came in 1990, when she played an extra in the Paul Cox film Golden Braid. She later studied law at La Trobe University. When she first started attending auditions Naidu was shocked because she felt that casting directors were "pigeon holing" her because of her ethnicity. After her first year of auditioning she became passionate about trying to change things.

== Career ==
Naidu has taken part in various theatre productions over her career in-between securing roles in television and film. Her television career began with small roles in the children's shows The Gift and Lift Off. Then came a guest role in the Australian drama series G.P. She soon gained a supporting role in the 1998 film Dead Letter Office as the office worker Mary. The actress also secured other guest roles in the late 1990s in the films Road to Nhill, Mallboy and the television series Blue Heelers.

In 1998, Naidu secured one of her most prominent television roles, playing Phrani Gupta in the Australian Broadcasting Corporation drama SeaChange. The role made her a favourite with viewers. Naidu liked the role because Phrani is not a clichéd Indian woman, adding that "[Phrani] is industrious, has good business sense and can turn her hand to anything." At the time Australian actors organised a strike over pay disputes. Her SeaChange co-star Kevin Harrington claimed that Naidu had been underpaid by those in charge of the programme.

Following SeaChange Naidu secured guest roles in Blue Heelers, Stingers, Guinevere Jones and Something in the Air. She appeared in six more theatrical productions during 2003 and 2004. She then played various roles in the Belvoir production of Run Rabbit Run, at the Belvoir St Theatre, Sydney, and continued to pursue on camera work, taking a role in legal and medical drama MDA and acted in the short film Tackle.

Naidu also writes theatre productions. On 20 September 2005, her autobiographical play Yellowfeather opened at the Sydney Opera House. It was delivered as a one-woman show and featured Naidu documenting her life with a comedic tone. The full stage production toured around Australia and then internationally. The following year she appeared in Gorkem Acaroglu's live stage documentary The Habib Show.

In the ten years that followed, Naidu continued to secure guest roles on various Australian television series including Tripping Over, Satisfaction, City Homicide, Mr & Mrs Murder, The Time of Our Lives, Winners & Losers and The Beautiful Lie. She also played Paula in the 2009 film The Boys Are Back. That year she also returned to the theatrical stage for The Melbourne Town Players production of Attract/Repel. In 2011, she appeared in the ABC1 drama At Home With Julia as Georgina. The show's cast won a 2012 Equity Ensemble Award for "Outstanding Performance by an Ensemble Cast in a Television Comedy Series". 2013 saw her return to theatre with the stage tour of Ganesh Versus The Third Reich.

In 2016, Naidu guest starred in Offspring, Wentworth and Please Like Me. That year in August it was announced that Naidu had secured the main role of Helena Chatterjee in Newton's Law and had begun filming. The series debuted on 9 February 2017 on the ABC network and it was created by Deb Cox, who also created SeaChange. Also in 2017, she took another main theatre role in Lally Katz's production Minnie & Liraz and made a guest appearance in the season finale of Rosehaven, playing Jocelyn. She also had a part portraying a university lecturer in the film Ali's Wedding. Naidu secured the supporting role of Toni Chadha in the 2018 Network Ten drama series Playing for Keeps. She then made a guest appearance in an episode of Network Ten's How to Stay Married.

In 2019, Naidu reprised her role as Phrani Gupta for a new series of SeaChange. 2021 saw Naidu play several roles on Australian television. She played Alison Chen in ABC's drama series Harrow, Alice Pike in ABC's comedy Fisk and Prisha Kapoor in the Netflix mini-series Clickbait. She then took on the role of school teacher Mrs Allen in Paramount+ comedy drama Spreadsheet. In 2022, she took on the role of Aunty Barb in SBS drama, A Beginner's Guide to Grief.

Naidu is a member of the Main Stage Green Room Panel which helps recognise talent in theatre productions and a member of the Media, Entertainment and Arts Alliance Equity Diversity Committee. She also works as a university lecturer and legal researcher. In December 2023, Naidu was appointed executive director of Western Edge, a charitable arts organisation that provides opportunities for young people in suburban Melbourne.

== Filmography ==
=== Television ===
Year	Title	Role	Notes
1995	G.P.	Henrietta	Guest role
1998–2000, 2019	SeaChange	Phrani Gupta	Supporting role
1999	Blue Heelers	Bronywn Salter	Guest role
2002	Stingers	Dr. Baragwanath	Guest role
2002	Something in the Air	Ms. Gibbs	Guest role
2002	Guinevere Jones	Marion Haynes	Guest role
2003	MDA	Siobhan Ray	Guest role
2005	Blue Heelers	Rosallie Parker	Guest role
2006	Tripping Over	Dr. Ngabo	Guest role
2009	Dirt Game	Doctor	Guest role
2010	Satisfaction	Angela Bangrove	Guest role
2011	City Homicide	Nazia Durrani	Guest role
2011	At Home With Julia	Georgina	Main role
2013	Mr & Mrs Murder	Janine	Guest role
2013	Vessel	Devon	Guest role
2013	The Time of Our Lives	Marla	Guest role
2013–2014	Winners & Losers	Dr. Naveena Malik	Guest role
2015	The Beautiful Lie	Joni	Guest role
2016	Wentworth	Dr. Chappell	Guest role
2016	Offspring	Linda Mason	Guest role
2016	Please Like Me	Nurse	Guest role
2017	How to Life	Dr. Kathleen	Guest role
2017	Newton's Law	Helena Chatterjee	Main role
2017, 2020	Rosehaven	Jocelyn	Guest role
2018	Playing for Keeps	Toni Chadha	Guest role
2018	How to Stay Married	Principal Vencat	Guest role
2021	Harrow	Alison Chen	Guest role
2021	Fisk	Alice Pike	Guest role
2021	Clickbait	Prisha Kapoor	Guest role
2021	Spreadsheet	Mrs Allen	Guest role
2022	A Beginner's Guide to Grief	Aunty Barb	Guest role
2023	Love Me	Sonia	Guest role
2023	Warnie	Tribunal Lawyer	Miniseries, guest role
2023	In Limbo	Shenali	Regular role
2024	Troppo	Devi Chandran	Guest role
2024	Apples Never Fall	Dr Adams	Guest role

=== Film ===
Year	Title	Role	Notes
1990	Golden Braid	Diner	Film extra
1995	God I Missed You Baby	Lina	Short film
1997	Road to Nhill	Dr. Ewing	Film
1998	Dead Letter Office	Mary	Film
2000	Mallboy	Lipstick Woman	Film
2000	Cheek to Cheek	Katherine Davenport	Short film
2004	Tackle	Susan	Short film
2009	The Boys Are Back	Paula	Film
2017	Ali's Wedding	University Lecturer	Film
2022	Run Rabbit Run	Andrea	Film
2024	Jason is my Dad	Kate	Short film
