= List of All Saints episodes =

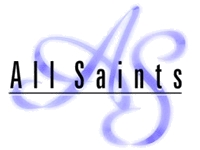
All Saints logo

All Saints is an Australian television medical drama that premiered on the Seven Network on 24 February 1998. The series aired for twelve seasons, and focused on the fictional lives of doctors and nurses as they dealt with the everyday medical issues that came through the doors of Ward 17, and later in the series, the Emergency Department. The show was created by Bevan Lee and John Holmes, who served as the script executive and executive producer, respectively. The series was produced by Jo Porter, Di Drew, MaryAnne Carroll and Bill Hughes.

Episodes were broadcast on Tuesday nights at 8:30 pm Australian Eastern Standard Time (AEST) for the first ten seasons. The eleventh and twelfth seasons aired after Packed to the Rafters on Tuesday nights at 9:30 pm AEST. All episodes were approximately forty-five minutes, excluding commercials. The first three seasons of the series were broadcast in 4:3, standard definition. The final nine seasons were broadcast in 16:9 in both high definition and standard. In 2014, the complete series was made readily available to stream in America on Hulu. In 2015, the first five seasons were made available for viewing on Presto in Australia. From 2016, reruns of All Saints are currently shown on the Seven Network’s youth-and-retro-oriented network, 7flix.

== Series overview ==
Series	Episodes	Originally released	
Series	Episodes	First released	Last released
1	41	24 February 1998	17 November 1998
2	43	9 February 1999	23 November 1999
3	41	8 February 2000	21 November 2000
4	43	13 February 2001	27 November 2001
5	43	5 February 2002	26 November 2002
6	43	11 February 2003	25 November 2003
7	40	27 February 2004	16 November 2004
8	41	8 February 2005	22 November 2005
9	40	28 February 2006	21 November 2006
10	41	13 February 2007	20 November 2007
11	40	12 February 2008	25 November 2008
12	37	3 February 2009	27 October 2009

== Episode list ==
=== Season 1 (1998) ===
No. overall	No. in season	Title	Directed by	Written by	Original release date
1	1	"Body and Soul"	Peter Sharp	Howard Griffiths	24 February 1998
2	2	"Everybody's Human"	Mark Piper	Susan Bower	24 February 1998
3	3	"Gut Feeling"	Grant Brown	Susan Bower	3 March 1998
4	4	"A Question of Strength"	Richard Sarell	Bevan Lee	10 March 1998
5	5	"Night Shift"	Richard Jasek	Anthony Ellis	17 March 1998
6	6	"Give and Take"	Mark Piper	Grant Fraser	24 March 1998
7	7	"Combat Zone"	Peter Sharp	Ro Hume	31 March 1998
8	8	"Think Positive"	Mark Piper	Grant Fraser & Andy Ryan	7 April 1998
9	9	"Forget Me Not"	Karl Zwicky	Greg Haddrick	14 April 1998
10	10	"A Little Magic"	Richard Sarell	Louise Crane-Bowes	21 April 1998
11	11	"Terminal Speed"	Peter Sharp	Annette Moore	28 April 1998
12	12	"Heart to Heart"	Di Drew	David Phillips	5 May 1998
13	13	"The Hard Yards"	Scott Feeney	Margaret Wilson	12 May 1998
14	14	"Goodnight Sweetheart"	Karl Zwicky	David Allen	19 May 1998
15	15	"Crimes of the Heart"	Paul Faint	Julie Monton	26 May 1998
16	16	"Nothing But the Truth"	Di Drew	Andy Ryan & Katherine Thomson	2 June 1998
17	17	"Babes in the Woods"	Scott Feeney	Louise Crane-Bowes	9 June 1998
18	18	"Sounds of Silence"	Grant Brown	Chris Phillips	16 June 1998
19	19	"Hard Day's Night"	Leigh Spence	Grant McAloon	23 June 1998
20	20	"Revelations"	Paul Faint	Anthony Ellis-Morris	30 June 1998
21	21	"Smooth Operator"	Karl Zwicky	Marcia Gardner	7 July 1998
22	22	"Truth or Dare"	Karl Steinberg	Ro Hume	14 July 1998
23	23	"Possession"	Leigh Spence	Ro Hume	21 July 1998
24	24	"The Price You Pay"	Peter Sharp	Peter Kinloch & Louise Crane	28 July 1998
25	25	"A Mother's Love"	Geoff Cawthorn	Tracey Trinder-Doig & Andy Ryan	4 August 1998
26	26	"Touch and Go"	Robert Klenner	Bevan Lee	11 August 1998
27	27	"Yesterday's News"	Catherine Roden	Louise Crane-Bowes	18 August 1998
28	28	"Family Feud"	Peter Sharp	Sally Webb	25 August 1998
29	29	"Little White Lies"	Geoff Cawthorn	Carol Williams & Andy Ryan	1 September 1998
30	30	"Best Laid Plans"	Robert Klenner	David Phillips	8 September 1998
31	31	"Parting Friends"	Catherine Roden	Chris Hawkshaw	15 September 1998
32	32	"Cards on the Table"	Scott Feeney	Grant Fraser	22 September 1998
33	33	"Boys Will Be Boys"	Geoff Cawthorn	David Phillips	29 September 1998
34	34	"Live Now, Pay Later"	Robert Klenner	Michaeley O'Brien	29 September 1998
35	35	"Out of Control"	Catherine Roden	Grant McAloon & Annette Moore	6 October 1998
36	36	"Mirror, Mirror on the Wall"	Scott Feeney	Louise Crane-Bowes	13 October 1998
37	37	"The Price of Love"	Mark Piper	Alexa Wyatt	20 October 1998
38	38	"Happy Death Day"	Grant Brown	Charlie Strachan	27 October 1998
39	39	"Moment of Truth"	Peter Fisk	Anne Lucas	3 November 1998
40	40	"Hard Rain"	Scott Feeney	Marcia Gardner	10 November 1998
41	41	"Christmas Spice"	Mark Piper	Margaret Wilson	17 November 1998

=== Season 2 (1999) ===
No. overall	No. in season	Title	Directed by	Written by	Original release date
42	1	"Truth & Consequence – Part 1"	Grant Brown	Louise Crane-Bowes	9 February 1999
43	2	"Truth & Consequence – Part 2"	Robert Klenner	Louise Crane-Bowes	9 February 1999
44	3	"Aftershocks"	Peter Fisk	Sally Webb	16 February 1999
45	4	"The Longest Day"	Scott Feeney	Christina Milligan	23 February 1999
46	5	"If These Walls Could Talk"	Grant Brown	Cathy Strickland & Andy Ryan	2 March 1999
47	6	"Getting to Know You"	Robert Klenner	Anthony Ellis-Morris	9 March 1999
48	7	"Dependence Day"	Peter Fisk	Andy Ryan & Shane Porteous	16 March 1999
49	8	"Bloodlines"	Geoff Cawthorn	Annette Moore	23 March 1999
50	9	"More Things in Heaven and Earth"	Malcolm McDonald	Bevan Lee	30 March 1999
51	10	"Pushed to the Limit"	Robert Klenner	Margaret Wilson	6 April 1999
52	11	"Friends and Lovers"	Peter Fisk	Louise Crane-Bowes	13 April 1999
53	12	"Judgement Day"	Peter Fisk	Charlie Strachan	20 April 1999
54	13	"Roll the Dice"	Catherine Roden	Michaeley O'Brien	27 April 1999
55	14	"My Mother, Myself"	Robert Klenner	Anthony Ellis	4 May 1999
56	15	"Get a Life"	Peter Fisk	Christina Milligan	11 May 1999
57	16	"An Irish Lullaby"	Geoff Cawthorn	Lesley and Jenny Lewis	18 May 1999
58	17	"Head to Head"	Catherine Roden	Kristen Dunphy	25 May 1999
59	18	"Desperate Remedies"	Robert Klenner	Anthony Ellis & Alexa Wyatt	1 June 1999
60	19	"The Human Touch"	Peter Fisk	Louise Crane-Bowes	8 June 1999
61	20	"Disaster Plan"	Geoff Cawthorn	Margaret Wilson	15 June 1999
62	21	"Forget-Me-Nots"	Catherine Roden	Charlie Strachan	22 June 1999
63	22	"Shoot the Messenger"	Robert Klenner	Grace Morris	29 June 1999
64	23	"In With the New"	Peter Fisk	Annette Moore & Sally Webb	6 July 1999
65	24	"Second Chance"	Geoff Cawthorn	Bevan Lee	13 July 1999
66	25	"Endgame"	Catherine Roden	Christina Milligan	20 July 1999
67	26	"Behind Closed Curtains"	Robert Klenner	David Phillips	27 July 1999
68	27	"Lesser of Two Evils"	Peter Fisk	Louise Crane-Bowes	3 August 1999
69	28	"A Whole Lot to Lose"	Di Drew	John Banas	10 August 1999
70	29	"Just Like a Woman"	Geoff Bennett	Alexa Wyatt	17 August 1999
71	30	"Three's a Crowd"	Catherine Roden	Chris Hawkshaw	24 August 1999
72	31	"Time Bombs"	Peter Fisk	Peter Neale	31 August 1999
73	32	"Memories by Moonlight"	Peter Sharp	Charlie Strachan	7 September 1999
74	33	"True Love and the Blues"	Geoff Bennett	Serge Lazareff	14 September 1999
75	34	"Knowing Me, Knowing You"	Catherine Roden	David Phillips	21 September 1999
76	35	"When Duty Calls"	Peter Fisk	Louise Crane-Bowes	28 September 1999
77	36	"The Ties That Bind"	Mark Piper	Anthony Ellis	5 October 1999
78	37	"Lost and Found"	Geoff Bennett	Margaret Wilson	12 October 1999
79	38	"The Stuff of Dreams"	Catherine Roden	Annette Moore	19 October 1999
80	39	"Outside the Square"	Peter Fisk	Andy Ryan	26 October 1999
81	40	"Everyone Loves a Winner"	Mark Piper	Chris Hawkshaw	2 November 1999
82	41	"Blood and Water"	Kevin Carlin	Serge Lazareff	9 November 1999
83	42	"Life Class"	Catherine Roden	Charlie Strachan	16 November 1999
84	43	"Ghosts of Christmas Past"	Peter Fisk	Louise Crane-Bowes	23 November 1999

=== Season 3 (2000) ===
No. overall	No. in season	Title	Directed by	Written by	Original release date
85	1	"Valley of the Shadow – Part 1"	Mark Piper	David Phillips	8 February 2000
86	2	"Valley of the Shadow – Part 2"	Mark Piper	Margaret Wilson	8 February 2000
87	3	"Bending and Breaking"	Kevin Carlin	Anthony Ellis	15 February 2000
88	4	"Eye of the Beholder"	Peter Fisk	John Banas	22 February 2000
89	5	"First, Do No Harm"	Nicky Marshall	Ro Hume	22 February 2000
90	6	"After the Ball"	Mark Piper	Charlie Strachan	7 March 2000
91	7	"Command and Control"	Geoff Cawthorn	Chris Hawkshaw	14 March 2000
92	8	"A Fraction Too Much Friction"	Peter Fisk	Denise Morgan	21 March 2000
93	9	"A Fine Balance"	Catherine Roden	Serge Lazareff	28 March 2000
94	10	"In the Blood"	Mark Piper	Peter Kinloch	4 April 2000
95	11	"Hearts and Minds"	Chris Martin-Jones	Anthony Ellis	11 April 2000
96	12	"Food for Thought"	Mark Piper	Margaret Wilson	18 April 2000
97	13	"Blessed Release"	Peter Fisk	David Phillips	25 April 2000
98	14	"Rush to Judgement"	Catherine Roden	Andy Ryan & Ro Hume	2 May 2000
99	15	Judge Not...	Chris Martin-Jones	Charlie Strachan	9 May 2000
100	16	...Lest Ye Be Judged	Peter Fisk	Charlie Strachan	16 May 2000
101	17	"Duty of Care"	Catherine Roden	Louise Crane	23 May 2000
102	18	"Beyond All Praise"	Scott Feeney	Fiona Kelly	30 May 2000
103	19	"Out of Nowhere"	Di Drew	Serge Lazareff	6 June 2000
104	20	"Frozen in Time"	Peter Fisk	Denise Morgan	13 June 2000
105	21	"Girl of the Moment"	Catherine Roden	Chris Hawkshaw	20 June 2000
106	22	"Dead on Time"	Scott Feeney	Anthony Ellis	27 June 2000
107	23	"Blood, Sweat and Tears"	Di Drew	Margaret Wilson	4 July 2000
108	24	"Twentieth Century Blues"	Scott Hartford Davis	David Phillips	11 July 2000
109	25	"Into the Unknown"	Catherine Roden	Charlie Strachan	25 July 2000
110	26	"Promise of Things to Come"	Kevin Carlin	Louise Crane	25 July 2000
111	27	"What Becomes of the Broken Hearted?"	Di Drew	Annette Moore & Sarah Smith	1 August 2000
112	28	"The Cost of Living"	Scott Hartford Davis	Andy Ryan	8 August 2000
113	29	"One for the Road"	Mark Piper	Serge Lazareff & Margaret Wilson	15 August 2000
114	30	"Another Place, Another Time"	Kevin Carlin	Louise Crane	22 August 2000
115	31	"Bosom of the Family"	Di Drew	Chris Hawkshaw	29 August 2000
116	32	"Duty Bound"	Scott Hartford Davis	Denise Morgan	5 September 2000
117	33	"Tender Loving Care"	Mark Piper	David Phillips	12 September 2000
118	34	"Ghosts"	Scott Feeney	Charlie Strachan	3 October 2000
119	35	"More Than Life"	Geoffrey Nottage	Michaeley O'Brien	10 October 2000
120	36	"The Best Laid Plans"	Mark Piper	Christina Milligan	17 October 2000
121	37	"Lottery of Life"	Scott Feeney	Andy Ryan & Serge Lazareff	24 October 2000
122	38	"Fate Dances with Lady Luck"	Geoff Bennett	Chris Hawkshaw	31 October 2000
123	39	"Me, Myself and I"	Kevin Carlin	Daniel Krige	7 November 2000
124	40	"Heart and Soul"	Mark Piper	Denise Morgan	14 November 2000
125	41	"Stolen Moments"	Di Drew	Louise Crane	21 November 2000

=== Season 4 (2001) ===
No. overall	No. in season	Title	Directed by	Written by	Original release date
126	1	"The Heat is On"	Kevin Carlin	Andy Ryan	13 February 2001
127	2	"What Katie Did Next"	Peter Fisk	David Phillips	20 February 2001
128	3	"Happy Birthday"	Catherine Roden	Charlie Strachan	27 February 2001
129	4	"Bend Till You Break"	Scott Hartford Davis	Michaeley O'Brien	6 March 2001
130	5	"A Matter of Choice"	Rob Stewart	Louise Crane	13 March 2001
131	6	"Mixed Messages"	Peter Fisk	Anthony Ellis	20 March 2001
132	7	"Defiance & Denial"	David Caesar	Bill Garner	27 March 2001
133	8	"Secrets and Lies"	Scott Hartford Davis	David Hannam	3 April 2001
134	9	"Changing Places"	Rob Stewart	Sally Webb	3 April 2001
135	10	"Too Little Too Late"	Peter Fisk	Margaret Wilson	10 April 2001
136	11	"Night Terrors"	Catherine Roden	Christina Milligan	17 April 2001
137	12	"Lest We Forget"	Scott Hartford Davis	Charlie Strachan	24 April 2001
138	13	"Lost Boys"	Peter Sharp	David Phillips	1 May 2001
139	14	"You Do Me Wrong"	Peter Fisk	Fiona Kelly	8 May 2001
140	15	"All the Sons & Daughters"	Scott Hartford Davis	Anthony Ellis	15 May 2001
141	16	"To Be or Not to Be"	Catherine Roden	Denise Morgan & Rick Held	22 May 2001
142	17	"Growing Pains"	Geoff Cawthorn	Louise Crane	29 May 2001
143	18	"Bed of Roses"	Catherine Roden	Rick Held	5 June 2001
144	19	"Can You Hear Me?"	Karl Zwicky	Michaeley O'Brien	12 June 2001
145	20	"Close to Home"	Peter Fisk	Margaret Wilson	17 June 2001
146	21	"Skeletons in the Closet"	Scott Hartford Davis	John Concannon	26 June 2001
147	22	"The Sign"	Peter Fisk	Sarah Walker	3 July 2001
148	23	"Maiden's Revenge"	David Caesar	Fiona Kelly	10 July 2001
149	24	"Chains of Love"	Karl Zwicky	David Phillips	10 July 2001
150	25	"Reality Bites"	Grant Brown	Louise Crane	17 July 2001
151	26	"Law of the Jungle"	Scott Hartford Davis	Christina Milligan	24 July 2001
152	27	"Private Lives"	Peter Fisk	Edwina Searle	31 July 2001
153	28	"Empty Nest"	Scott Feeney	Denise Morgan	7 August 2001
154	29	"Poles Apart"	Grant Brown	Sarah Walker	14 August 2001
155	30	"Delicate Matters"	Scott Hartford Davis	Louise Crane	21 August 2001
156	31	"Look into My Eyes"	Scott Feeney	Sally Webb	28 August 2001
157	32	"Wild Justice"	Peter Fisk	Fiona Kelly	4 September 2001
158	33	"Life as We Know It"	Catherine Roden	David Hannam	11 September 2001
159	34	"Simpatico"	Peter Fisk	David Phillips	18 September 2001
160	35	"Critical Pressure"	Scott Hartford Davis	Louise Crane	25 September 2001
161	36	"Bitter Medicine"	Scott Feeney	Hamish Wright & Sarah Walker	2 October 2001
162	37	"Heartache"	Catherine Roden	John Concannon	9 October 2001
163	38	"Where There's Smoke"	Julian Pringle	Rick Held	16 October 2001
164	39	"Child's Play"	Peter Fisk	Denise Morgan	23 October 2001
165	40	"Behind Closed Doors"	Scott Patterson	Sarah Walker	30 October 2001
166	41	"A Little Death"	Catherine Roden	Christina Milligan & David Boutland	6 November 2001
167	42	"The Other Side of Perfection"	Julian Pringle	David Hannam	13 November 2001
168	43	"Falling Down"	Rob Stewart	Christina Milligan	27 November 2001

=== Season 5 (2002) ===
No. overall	No. in season	Title	Directed by	Written by	Original release date
169	1	Opening Night	Peter Fisk	Louise Crane	5 February 2002
170	2	The Show Must Go On	Peter Fisk	Louise Crane	12 February 2002
171	3	"In the Lap of the Gods"	Scott Feeney	Jenny Lewis & Lesley Lewis	19 February 2002
172	4	"Slings and Arrows"	Julian Pringle	Denise Morgan	26 February 2002
173	5	"Private Affairs"	Robert Marchand	Rick Held	5 March 2002
174	6	"Loose Lips"	Peter Fisk	Phil Sanders, Sarah Walker	12 March 2002
175	7	"Invisible Things"	Scott Feeney	Philip Dalkin	19 March 2002
176	8	"All Chocked Up"	Julian Pringle	Christina Milligan	26 March 2002
177	9	"Flaws in the Glass"	Robert Marchand	Chris Corbett	2 April 2002
178	10	"Only Human"	Peter Fisk	Sarah Walker	9 April 2002
179	11	"Chemistry"	Scott Feeney	John Concannon	16 April 2002
180	12	"No Respite"	Tina Butler	Sarah Walker	23 April 2002
181	13	"Thicker than Water"	Robert Marchand	Denise Morgan	30 April 2002
182	14	"Pride and Prejudice"	Sally Webb	Peter Fisk	7 May 2002
183	15	"Overload"	Scott Feeney	John Banas	14 May 2002
184	16	"Swept Away"	Julian Pringle	Christina Milligan	21 May 2002
185	17	"All the Right Reasons"	Robert Marchand	Ted Roberts	28 May 2002
186	18	"Coming Clean"	Peter Fisk	Philip Dalkin	4 June 2002
187	19	"Shame"	Scott Feeney	Rick Held	11 June 2002
188	20	"White Noise"	Frank Arnold	John Concannon	18 June 2002
189	21	"Personal Matters"	Robert Marchand	Grant Fraser & Sarah Walker	25 June 2002
190	22	"M for Memory"	Peter Fisk	Peter Gawler	2 July 2002
191	23	"Running on Empathy"	Catherine Roden	Denise Morgan	9 July 2002
192	24	"First Steps"	Scott Hartford Davis	Charlie Strachan	16 July 2002
193	25	"Judgement Day"	Scott Patterson	Louise Crane	23 July 2002
194	26	"Due Diligence"	Catherine Roden	David Hannam & Peter Neale	6 August 2002
195	27	"In the Family Way"	Peter Fisk	Christina Milligan & Sarah Walker	6 August 2002
196	28	"An Itch to Scratch"	Julian Pringle	Sally Webb	13 August 2002
197	29	"No Expectations"	Robert Marchand	Chris Corbett	20 August 2002
198	30	"The Untouchables"	Peter Fisk	John Concannon	27 August 2002
199	31	"Where the Heart Is"	Frank Arnold	John Banas	3 September 2002
200	32	"Secrets"	Di Drew	Louise Crane	10 September 2002
201	33	"Bedtime Stories"	Robert Marchand	Philip Dalkin	17 September 2002
202	34	"When All is Lost"	Peter Fisk	David Hannam	24 September 2002
203	35	"Into the Light"	Scott Feeney	Denise Morgan	1 October 2002
204	36	"Big Kids"	Bill Hughes	Sarah Walker	8 October 2002
205	37	"You Should've Said"	Julian Pringle	Loraine Rogers	15 October 2002
206	38	"Hear Me, Touch Me, Heal Me"	Peter Fisk	Sally Webb	22 October 2002
207	39	"Down to Earth"	Scott Feeney	Chris Corbett	29 October 2002
208	40	"Consuming Passions"	Scott Patterson	John Concannon	5 November 2002
209	41	"Musical Beds"	Richard Jasek	John Banas	12 November 2002
210	42	"Twice the Fun"	Peter Fisk	Philip Dalkin	19 November 2002
211	43	"Yesterday, Today & Tomorrow"	Peter Fisk	Louise Crane	26 November 2002

=== Season 6 (2003) ===
No. overall	No. in season	Title	Directed by	Written by	Original release date	Australian viewers (millions)
212	1	"Trust"	Scott Feeney	Sarah Walker	11 February 2003	1.40
213	2	"Heroic Measures"	Catherine Roden	Sam Meikle	11 February 2003	1.40
214	3	"Destiny's Child"	Aarne Neeme	Denise Morgan & Phillip Dalkin	18 February 2003	1.46
215	4	"Broken English"	Geoffrey Nottage	Andrew Kelly	25 February 2003	1.37
216	5	"All Our Tomorrows"	Scott Hartford-Davis	Sally Webb	4 March 2003	1.38
217	6	"Older & Wiser"	Julian Pringle	Chris Corbett	11 March 2003	1.31
218	7	"Separation Pains"	Peter Fisk	John Concannon	18 March 2003	1.27
219	8	"The Last Supper"	Jean-Pierre Mignon	Sarah Walker	25 March 2003	1.32
220	9	"Only the Good Die Young"	Scott Hartford-Davis	Louise Crane-Bowes	1 April 2003	1.45
221	10	"Vale"	Chris Martin-Jones	John Banas	8 April 2003	1.41
222	11	"The Art of Flowers"	Geoff Bennett	David Hannam	15 April 2003	1.40
223	12	"Fanning the Flames"	Jean-Pierre Mignon	Denise Morgan	22 April 2003	1.30
224	13	"Breathing Space"	Shawn Seet	Phillip Dalkin	29 April 2003	1.33
225	14	"Past Tense"	Scott Hartford-Davis	Sally Webb	6 May 2003	1.36
226	15	"Seeking Asylum"	Geoff Bennett	Sarah Walker	13 May 2003	1.36
227	16	"In Control"	Carla Drago	Lesley Lewis	20 May 2003	1.42
228	17	"Best Intentions"	Geoffrey Nottage	John Concannon	27 May 2003	1.48
229	18	"Night Moves"	Catherine Roden	John Banas	3 June 2003	1.50
230	19	"Sins of the Past"	Bill Hughes	Louise Crane-Bowes	10 June 2003	1.54
231	20	"No Place Like Home"	Peter Fisk	Sarah Walker	17 June 2003	1.55
232	21	"Presumption of Guilt"	Geoffrey Nottage	Peter Neale	24 June 2003	1.54
233	22	"A Rock and a Hard Place"	Catherine Roden	Denise Morgan	1 July 2003	1.44
234	23	"The Things We Do For Love"	Bill Hughes	Peter Dalkin & Peter Neale	8 July 2003	1.48
235	24	"Suspicious Minds"	Scott Hartford-Davis	David Hannam	15 July 2003	1.51
236	25	"Now You See Me"	Aarne Neeme	Sally Webb	22 July 2003	1.37
237	26	"A Second Look"	Catherine Roden	Loraine Rogers	29 July 2003	1.38
238	27	"Some You Win..."	Bill Hughes	John Banas	5 August 2003	1.32
239	28	"Eyes Wide Open"	Scott Hartford-Davis	Rick Held	12 August 2003	1.31
240	29	"Friends in Need"	Peter Fisk	John Concannon	19 August 2003	1.33
241	30	"Too Close for Comfort"	Geoffrey Nottage	Louise Crane-Bowes	26 August 2003	1.31
242	31	"Complicity"	Andrew Prowse	Andrew Kelly	2 September 2003	1.28
243	32	"The Devil to Pay"	Bill Hughes	Denise Morgan	9 September 2003	1.25
244	33	"Wrong Call"	Scott Hartford-Davis	Sarah Walker	16 September 2003	1.24
245	34	"To Forgive, Divine"	Geoffrey Nottage	Anthony Ellis & Rick Held	23 September 2003	1.30
246	35	"Question of Guilt"	Bill Hughes	John Banas	30 September 2003	1.24
247	36	"Safety Net"	Andrew Prowse	Peter Neale & Suzanne Hawley	7 October 2003	1.24
248	37	"Look Before You Leap"	Catherine Roden	Sam Meikle	14 October 2003	1.18
249	38	"Doctor of Choice"	Geoffrey Nottage	Sally Webb & Chris Hawkshaw	21 October 2003	1.11
250	39	"Harm's Way"	Bill Hughes	Alex Pope	28 October 2003	1.31
251	40	"Other People's Business"	Jean-Pierre Mignon	Graham Richards	4 November 2003	1.23
252	41	"The Right Thing?"	Catherine Roden	Denise Morgan	11 November 2003	1.20
253	42	"Loser Pays"	Geoffrey Nottage	Tim Pye	25 November 2003	1.40
254	43	"Never Forget"	Peter Fisk	David Hannam	25 November 2003	1.40

=== Season 7 (2004) ===
No. overall	No. in season	Title	Directed by	Written by	Original release date
255	1	"One Day at a Time"	Jean-Pierre Mignon	Sally Webb	17 February 2004
256	2	"Opening Up"	Catherine Roden	Harry West	17 February 2004
257	3	"Happy Families"	Geoffrey Nottage	John Banas	24 February 2004
258	4	"Wolf"	Kate Woods	John Concannon	2 March 2004
259	5	"In Too Deep"	Jean-Pierre Mignon	Louise Crane-Bowes	9 March 2004
260	6	"Peripheral Vision"	Catherine Roden	Louise Crane-Bowes	16 March 2004
261	7	"Fight or Flight"	Carla Drago	Louise Crane-Bowes	23 March 2004
262	8	"Prison Walls"	Peter Fisk	Rick Held	30 March 2004
263	9	"Deceptions"	Jean-Pierre Mignon	Denise Morgan	6 April 2004
264	10	"A Place in the Heart"	Catherine Roden	David Hannam	13 April 2004
265	11	"Brave New World"	Catherine Millar	Sarah Walker	20 April 2004
266	12	"Bad Pennies"	Peter Zisk	John Banas	27 April 2004
267	13	"Ground Zero"	Jean-Pierre Mignon	John Hugginson	4 May 2004
268	14	"Life After Death"	Catherine Roden	Kelly Lefever	11 May 2004
269	15	"Zero Tolerance"	Catherine Millar	Sally Webb	18 May 2004
270	16	"Meltdown"	Peter Fisk	Louise Crane-Bowes	25 May 2004
271	17	"Into the Fire"	Jean-Pierre Mignon	Rick Held	1 June 2004
272	18	"Clean"	Catherine Roden	Andrew Kelly	8 June 2004
273	19	"Under the Skin"	Catherine Millar	Lesley Lewis & Catherine Millar	15 June 2004
274	20	"Feet of Clay"	Bill Hughes	Denise Morgan	22 June 2004
275	21	"Pecking Order"	Jean-Pierre Mignon	John Concannon	29 June 2004
276	22	"Luck of the Draw"	Catherine Roden	John Hugginson	6 July 2004
277	23	"Consequences"	Catherine Millar	John Banas	13 July 2004
278	24	"When Worlds Collide"	Bill Hughes	Susan Hore	20 July 2004
279	25	"Mind over Matter"	Jean-Pierre Mignon	Sally Webb	27 July 2004
280	26	"Falling From Grace"	Chris Martin-Jones	Louise Crane-Bowes	3 August 2004
281	27	"Bad Seed"	Robert Marchand	Rick Held	10 August 2004
282	28	"Out of Focus"	Mark Piper	Fiona Kelly	31 August 2004
283	29	"Odd Couples"	Jean-Pierre Mignon	Sarah Walker	31 August 2004
284	30	"Benefit of the Doubt"	Chris Martin-Jones	David Hannam & Sarah Walker	7 September 2004
285	31	"Don't Look Back"	Bill Hughes	Sue Hore	14 September 2004
286	32	"Karma"	Mark Piper	John Hugginson	21 September 2004
287	33	"Panic Stations"	Jean-Pierre Mignon	Kelly Lefever	28 September 2004
288	34	"Three Strikes"	Chris Martin-Jones	Charlie Strachan	5 October 2004
289	35	"Out on a Limb"	Shawn Seet	Sally Webb	12 October 2004
290	36	"The Extra Mile"	Peter Fisk	Louise Crane-Bowes	19 October 2004
291	37	"On the Brink"	Tony Tilse	Louise Crane-Bowes	26 October 2004
292	38	"The Last Resort"	Catherine Millar	Lesley Lewis	2 November 2004
293	39	"Cries for Help"	Shawn Seet	Sean Nash	9 November 2004
294	40	"The Season to be Jolly"	Catherine Roden	Sarah Walker	16 November 2004

=== Season 8 (2005) ===
No. overall	No. in season	Title	Directed by	Written by	Original release date
295	1	"Happy New Year"	Peter Fisk	Sarah Walker	8 February 2005
296	2	"Outside Looking In"	Catherine Millar	Toby Wallace	15 February 2005
297	3	"Sins of the Mothers"	Robert Marchand	John Banas	22 February 2005
298	4	"Begging For It"	Shawn Seet	Kevin Roberts	1 March 2005
299	5	"Lost and Found"	Catherine Millar	Elizabeth Coleman	8 March 2005
300	6	"Potential"	Jean-Pierre Mignon	Peter Neale	15 March 2005
301	7	"Letting Go"	Robert Marchand	Rick Held & Louise Crane-Bowes	29 March 2005
302	8	"Fractured"	Pino Amenta	Sean Nash	5 April 2005
303	9	"Funny Games"	Shawn Seet	Andrew Kelly	12 April 2005
304	10	"Boys will be Boys"	Jean-Pierre Mignon	Sarah Walker	19 April 2005
305	11	"Time Bomb"	Aarne Neeme	Fiona Kelly	26 April 2005
306	12	"While You Were Sleeping"	Pino Amenta	Bridie O'Neill	3 May 2005
307	13	"Echoes"	Catherine Roden	John Banas	10 May 2005
308	14	"Innocent until..."	Jean-Pierre Mignon	Susan Hore	17 May 2005
309	15	"False Convictions"	Bill Hughes	Sarah Walker	24 May 2005
310	16	"Maternal Instinct"	Jessica Hobbs	Toby Wallace	31 May 2005
311	17	"Double Lives"	Cameron Welsh	Peter Neale	7 June 2005
312	18	"New Beginnings"	Jean-Pierre Mignon	Sean Nash	14 June 2005
313	19	"Satisfaction"	Peter Fisk	Andrew Kelly	21 June 2005
314	20	"In the Name of Love"	Shawn Seet	Sarah Walker	28 June 2005
315	21	"Poison"	Cameron Welsh	Fiona Kelly	5 July 2005
316	22	"Right to Life"	Catherine Roden	Sam Meikle	12 July 2005
317	23	"Divide and Conquer"	Pino Amenta	John Banas	19 July 2005
318	24	"Love Me, Love Me Not"	Peter Fisk	Louise Crane-Bowes	2 August 2005
319	25	"Immortal"	Robert Marchand	Faith McKinnon	9 August 2005
320	26	"Moving On"	Mark Piper	Sarah Walker	9 August 2005
321	27	"Frozen Moments"	Pino Amenta	Louise Crane-Bowes	16 August 2005
322	28	"Room for Improvement"	Peter Fisk	Margaret Wilson	23 August 2005
323	29	"Requiem"	Robert Marchand	Peter Gawler	30 August 2005
324	30	"Spinning Out"	Mark Piper	Sean Nash	6 September 2005
325	31	"Honourable Things"	Tony Tilse	Chris Roache	13 September 2005
326	32	"A Lonely Road"	Aarne Neeme	Kevin Roberts	20 September 2005
327	33	"Time and Tide"	Lynn Hegarty	John Banas	27 September 2005
328	34	"One of Those Days"	Bill Hughes	Tim Gooding	4 October 2005
329	35	"Life's Lottery"	Jeffrey Walker	Sally Webb	11 October 2005
330	36	"Out of Darkness"	Aarne Neeme	Katherine Thomson	18 October 2005
331	37	"Taking the Plunge"	Jean-Pierre Mignon	Charlie Ctrachan	25 October 2005
332	38	"Thicker than Water"	Bill Hughes	Margaret Wilson	1 November 2005
333	39	"Reckless"	Shawn Seet	Peter Gawler	8 November 2005
334	40	"Season of Change"	Cameron Welsh	Fiona Kelly	15 November 2005
335	41	"In Sickness And in Health"	Jean-Pierre Mignon	Louise Crane-Bowes	22 November 2005

=== Season 9 (2006) ===
No. overall	No. in season	Title	Directed by	Written by	Original release date
336	1	"Til Death Do Us Part"	Cameron Welsh	Louise Crane-Bowes	28 February 2006
337	2	"The Real Thing"	Bill Hughes	John Banas	7 March 2006
338	3	"Moment of Truth"	Cameron Welsh	Sean Nash	14 March 2006
339	4	"No Way Out"	Robert Marchand	Faith McKinnon	21 March 2006
340	5	"The Things We Do"	Lynn Hegarty	Kevin Roberts	28 March 2006
341	6	"Facing the Music"	Jean-Pierre Mignon	Charlie Strachan	4 April 2006
342	7	"Behind Closed Doors"	Cameron Welsh	Chris Roache	11 April 2006
343	8	"The Mercy Seat"	Peter Fisk	Peter Gawler	18 April 2006
344	9	"Shadows of the Heart"	Shawn Seet	Sam Meikle	25 April 2006
345	10	"Just Desserts"	Jean-Pierre Mignon	Tim Gooding	2 May 2006
346	11	"Brothers in Arms"	Nicholas Bufalo	Fiona Kelly	9 May 2006
347	12	"Wait and See"	Lynn Hegarty	John Banas	16 May 2006
348	13	"Getting to Know You"	Peter Fisk	Sean Nash	23 May 2006
349	14	"Sink or Swim"	Jean-Pierre Mignon	Suzanne Hawley	30 May 2006
350	15	"An Apple a Day"	Catherien Millar	Sally Webb	6 June 2006
351	16	"The Way of It"	Bill Hughes	Charlie Strachan	6 June 2006
352	17	"A Rock and a Hard Place"	Cameron Welsh	Kevin Roberts	13 June 2006
353	18	"One for the Road"	Lynn Hegarty	Peter Gawler	20 June 2006
354	19	"By Choice Or By Chance"	Catherine Millar	Margaret Wilson	27 June 2006
355	20	"Tough Love"	Bill Hughes	Sam Meikle	4 July 2006
356	21	"When Duty Calls"	Cameron Welsh	Chris Roache	11 July 2006
357	22	"Two By Two"	Peter Fisk	John Banas	18 July 2006
358	23	"Drawing The Line"	Pino Amenta	Sean Nash	25 July 2006
359	24	"Truth Hurts"	Bill Hughes	Louise Crane-Bowes	1 August 2006
360	25	"Extreme Measures"	Lynn Hegarty	Fiona Kelly	8 August 2006
361	26	"Mind Games"	Cameron Welsh	Charlie Strachan	15 August 2006
362	27	"One Wrong Step"	Pino Amenta	Sally Webb	22 August 2006
363	28	"Private Lives"	Rob Marchand	Peter Gawler	29 August 2006
364	29	"The Other Man's Shoes"	Peter Fisk	Margaret Wilson	5 September 2006
365	30	"To The Ends of The Earth"	Martin Sacks	Sam Meikle	12 September 2006
366	31	"Ain't Love Grand"	Daina Reid	Kevin Roberts	19 September 2006
367	32	"Happy Returns"	Nicholas Bufalo	John Banas	26 September 2006
368	33	"Dead Girl Walking"	Jeffrey Walker	Sean Nash	3 October 2006
369	34	"Contact"	Cameron Welsh	Andrew Kelly	10 October 2006
370	35	"Where the Truth Lies"	Kevin Carlin	Fiona Kelly	17 October 2006
371	36	"Jaws of Death"	Bill Hughes	Jeff Truman	24 October 2006
372	37	"Love, Pain & the Whole Damn Thing"	Peter Fisk	Blake Ayshford	31 October 2006
373	38	"Breaking Point"	Cameron Welsh	Peter Gawler	7 November 2006
374	39	"Love and Hate"	Tony Krawitz	Sally Webb	14 November 2006
375	40	"Judgement Day"	Bill Hughes	John Banas	21 November 2006

=== Season 10 (2007) ===
No. overall	No. in season	Title	Directed by	Written by	Original release date	Australian viewers (millions)
376	1	"Family Matters"	Kevin Carlin	Louise Crane-Bowes	13 February 2007	1.081
377	2	"The Hardest Word"	Lynn Hegarty	Sean Nash	20 February 2007	1.389
378	3	"Thresholds"	Lynn-Maree Danzey	Kevin Roberts	27 February 2007	1.381
379	4	"Smoke and Mirrors"	Martin Sacks	Andrew Kelly	6 March 2007	1.247
380	5	"The Hearts of Men"	Peter Fisk	Peter Neale & Blake Ayshford	13 March 2007	1.357
381	6	"A Fresh Start"	Bill Hughes	Fiona Kelly	20 March 2007	1.510
382	7	"Back on Track"	Pino Amenta	Charlie Strachan	27 March 2007	1.576
383	8	"What Lies Beneath"	Lynn Hegarty	Jeff Truman	3 April 2007	1.533
384	9	"The Blink of an Eye"	Daina Reid	Peter Gawler	10 April 2007	1.609
385	10	"Life's Little Miracles"	Nicholas Buffalo	John Banas	17 April 2007	1.603
386	11	"Life Interrupted"	Jean Pierre Mignon	Sam Meikle	24 April 2007	1.496
387	12	"Choices of the Heart"	Peter Fisk	Sean Nash	8 May 2007	1.236
388	13	"Balancing Act"	Bill Hughes	Sally Webb	15 May 2007	1.367
389	14	"Timing"	Peter Phelps	Trent Atkinson	22 May 2007	1.278
390	15	"Some Kinds of Love"	Lynn-Maree Danzey	Andrew Kelly	29 May 2007	1.333
391	16	"End Game"	Nicholas Bufalo	Chris McCourt	5 June 2007	1.430
392	17	"The Trust Game"	Peter Fisk	Michael Miller	12 June 2007	1.447
393	18	"Precious Moments"	Tony Krawitz	Fiona Kelly	19 June 2007	1.503
394	19	"The Pain Of It All"	Peter Phelps	Kevin Roberts	26 June 2007	1.435
395	20	"Crossroads"	Jean-Pierre Mignon	Charlie Strachan	3 July 2007	1.541
396	21	"Bodies in Motion"	Lynn-Maree Danzey	Sam Meikle	10 July 2007	1.464
397	22	"One Moment in Time"	Peter Fisk	Sean Nash	17 July 2007	1.419
398	23	"Bad Blood"	Tony Krawitz	Sally Webb & Lily Taylor	24 July 2007	1.362
399	24	"Push Me, Pull You"	Peter Phelps	Sally Webb & Lily Taylor	31 July 2007	1.362
400	25	"Pressure Point"	Martin Sacks	Jeff Truman	24 July 2007	1.453
401	26	"Under the Skin"	Daina Reid	Sarah Lambert	7 August 2007	1.426
402	27	"Mixed Blessings"	Peter Fisk	Julie Edwards	14 August 2007	1.370
403	28	"Nowhere to Hide"	Lynn Hegarty	Kevin Roberts	21 August 2007	1.341
404	29	"Persona Non Grata"	Daniel Nettheim	Michael Miller	28 August 2007	1.364
405	30	"Running on Impulse"	Jean-Pierre Mignon	Sam Meikle	4 September 2007	1.388
406	31	"Reality Check"	Nicholas Bufalo	Charlie Strachan & Sacha Hamilton	11 September 2007	1.390
407	32	"If Only"	Lynn-Maree Danzey	Sean Nash	18 September 2007	1.412
408	33	"Lost and Found"	Pino Amenta	Peter Dick & Megan Herbert	25 September 2007	0.962
409	34	"No Stranger"	Jean-Pierre Mignon	Sally Webb	2 October 2007	1.253
410	35	"Throw Your Arms Around Me"	Peter Fisk	Jeff Truman	9 October 2007	1.306
411	36	"Open Hearts"	Lynn Hegarty	Chris McCourt	16 October 2007	1.374
412	37	"True Confessions"	Aarne Neeme	Trent Atkinson	23 October 2007	1.354
413	38	"Precious Time"	Jean-Pierre Mignon	Shelley Birse	30 October 2007	1.483
414	39	"Cutting Free"	Nicholas Bufalo	Michael Miller	6 November 2007	1.316
415	40	"Thin Ice"	Marcus Cole	Sam Meikle & Louise Crane-Bowes	13 November 2007	1.311
416	41	"Against the Wall - Part 1"	Tony Krawitz	Charlie Strachan	20 November 2007	1.326

=== Season 11 (2008) ===
No. overall	No. in season	Title	Directed by	Written by	Original release date	Australian viewers (millions)
417	1	"Against the Wall – Part 2"	Peter Fisk	Sean Nash	12 February 2008	1.155
418	2	"The Simple Things"	Geoffrey Cawthorn	Louise Crane-Bowes	19 February 2008	1.152
419	3	"Comfort Zone"	Lynn Hegarty	Peter Dick & Lily Taylor	26 February 2008	1.152
420	4	"Event Horizon"	Lynn-Maree Danzey	Jeff Truman & Linda Stainton	4 March 2008	1.021
421	5	"Caught in a Trap"	Nicholas Bufalo	Sally Webb	11 March 2008	1.172
422	6	"Careful What You Wish For"	Geoffrey Cawthorn	Trent Atkinson	18 March 2008	1.093
423	7	"Little Decisions"	Peter Fisk	Martin McKenna	25 March 2008	1.297
424	8	"Beginnings"	Martin Sacks	Denise Morgan	1 April 2008	1.073
425	9	"When Tomorrow Comes"	Nicholas Buffalo	Sam Meikle	8 April 2008	1.077
426	10	"Out of the Fire"	Jessica Hobbs	Charlie Strachan	15 April 2008	1.185
427	11	"It Ain't Necessarily So"	Jean-Pierre Mignon	Sean Nash	22 April 2008	1.184
428	12	"The Hand You're Dealt"	Ian Watson	Blake Ayshford	29 April 2008	1.251
429	13	"Stepping Up"	Martin Sacks	Robert Haywood	6 May 2008	1.202
430	14	"The Circle of Life"	Ian Gilmourn	Jeff Truman & Jo Watson	13 May 2008	1.219
431	15	"That Window in Time"	Peter Fisk	Sally Webb	20 May 2008	1.268
432	16	"Never Tell"	Jean-Pierre Mignon	Fiona Kelly	27 May 2008	1.330
433	17	"Risky Business"	Andrew 'Killer' Bowden	Chris McCourt	3 June 2008	1.339
434	18	"Under My Skin"	Jessica Hobbs	Trent Atkinson	10 June 2008	1.296
435	19	"Blind Faith"	Ian Gilmourn	Lily Taylor	17 June 2008	1.380
436	20	"Torn Apart"	Martin Sacks	Charlie Strachan	24 June 2008	1.300
437	21	"Justice For None"	Jean-Pierre Mignon	Sean Nash	1 July 2008	1.148
438	22	"Fearless and Searching"	Daniel Nettheim	Blake Ayshford	8 July 2008	1.274
439	23	"Bloodlines"	Jet Wilkinson	Denise Morgan	15 July 2008	1.356
440	24	"Sons and Lovers"	Ian Gilmourn	Jeff Truman	22 July 2008	1.407
441	25	"Horses for Courses"	Marcus Cole	Trent Atkinson	29 July 2008	1.313
442	26	"Wish List"	Nicholas Buffalo	Chris McCourt	5 August 2008	1.290
443	27	"Best Laid Plans"	Jean-Pierre Mignon	Louise Crane-Bowes	26 August 2008	1.273
444	28	"Echoes"	Kate Woods	Sally Webb	2 September 2008	1.319
445	29	"Solitary Confinement"	Ian Gilmourn	Fiona Kelly	9 September 2008	N/A
446	30	"Better Safe Than Sorry"	Marcus Cole	Jenny Lewis	16 September 2008	N/A
447	31	"Not What You'd Expect"	Jean-Pierre Mignon	Sean Nash	23 September 2008	N/A
448	32	"Training Wheels"	Jet Wilkinson	Trent Atkinson	30 September 2008	N/A
449	33	"When the Party's Over"	Kay Pavlou	Andrew Kelly	7 October 2008	N/A
450	34	"Out on a Limb"	Cherie Nowlan	Charlie Strachan	14 October 2008	N/A
451	35	"Running For Cover"	Lynn-Maree Danzey	Clare Atkinson	21 October 2008	N/A
452	36	"Reality Check"	Kate Woods	Chris McCourt	28 October 2008	N/A
453	37	"Secrets and Lies"	Jet Wilkinson	Trent Atkinson	4 November 2008	N/A
454	38	"A Safe Place"	Ian Watson	Sally Webb	11 November 2008	N/A
455	39	"Spinning Out"	Kay Pavlou	Fiona Kelly	18 November 2008	N/A
456	40	"Time Bomb"	Lynn-Maree Danzey	Alexa Wyatt	25 November 2008	N/A

=== Season 12 (2009) ===
No. overall	No. in season	Title	Directed by	Written by	Original release date
457	1	"Out of the Ashes"	Ian Gilmour	Louise Crane-Bowes	3 February 2009
458	2	"Dreams and Nightmares"	Jet Wilkinson	Sean Nash	10 February 2009
459	3	"Day One"	Samantha Lang	Trent Atkinson	17 February 2009
460	4	"Sins of the Past"	Marcus Cole	Jenny and Lesley Lewis	24 February 2009
461	5	"Evil Is As Evil Does"	Jean-Pierre Mignon	Denise Morgan	3 March 2009
462	6	"Facing the Music"	Nicholas Buffalo	Michael Miller	10 March 2009
463	7	"Awake in Fright"	Daniel Nettheim	Lily Taylor	17 March 2009
464	8	"Behind Closed Doors"	Jet Wilkinson	Sally Webb	24 March 2009
465	9	"Danger Zone"	Ian Gilmourn	Fiona Kelly	31 March 2009
466	10	"Pushed Too Far"	Marcus Cole	Chris McCourt & Linda Stainton	21 April 2009
467	11	"Handle With Care"	Jean-Pierre Mignon	Andrew Kelly	28 April 2009
468	12	"The Devil Within"	Cherie Nowlan	Sean Nash	5 May 2009
469	13	"Give and Take"	Ian Watson	Trent Atkinson	12 May 2009
470	14	"When the Bough Breaks"	Lynn-Maree Danzey	Jeff Truman	19 May 2009
471	15	"Seeing The Light"	Ian Gilmourn	Alexa Wyatt	26 May 2009
472	16	"We All Fall Down"	Geoff Bennett	Clare Atkinson	2 June 2009
473	17	"Bodies in Motion"	Jet Wilkinson	Lily Taylor	9 June 2009
474	18	"On Second Thoughts..."	Ian Watson	Sally Webb	16 June 2009
475	19	"Starting Over"	Marcus Cole	Fiona Kelly	23 June 2009
476	20	"Curve Balls"	Lynn-Maree Danzey	Chris McCourt	30 June 2009
477	21	"Test of Faith"	Ian Gilmourn	Blake Ayshford	7 July 2009
478	22	"Blood is Thicker"	Jean-Pierre Mignon	Martin McKenna	14 July 2009
479	23	"Out of Control"	Jet Wilkinson	Lesley and Jenny Lewis	21 July 2009
480	24	"In Trust"	Di Drew	Trent Atkinson	28 July 2009
481	25	"In Duty Bound"	Marcus Cole	Denise Morgan	4 August 2009
482	26	"The Waiting Game"	Lynn-Maree Danzey	Lily Taylor	11 August 2009
483	27	"A Precious Waste"	Ian Gilmourn	Clare Atkinson	18 August 2009
484	28	"Tell-Tale Hearts"	Jean-Pierre Mignon	Trent Atkinson	25 August 2009
485	29	"Moving On"	Jet Wilkinson	Fiona and Andrew Kelly	1 September 2009
486	30	"Safe Haven"	Scott Hartford Davis	Chris McCourt	8 September 2009
487	31	"Win Some, Lose Some"	Marcus Cole	Andrew Kelly	15 September 2009
488	32	"What it Takes"	Lynn-Maree Danzey	Trent Atkinson	22 September 2009
489	33	"Too Close For Comfort"	Jean-Pierre Mignon	Jenny Lewis & Hamish Cameron	29 September 2009
490	34	"Damned If You Do"	Pino Amenta	Martin McKenna	6 October 2009
491	35	"The Two of Us"	Jet Wilkinson	Kim Wilson & Luke Devenish	13 October 2009
492	36	"Reality Check"	Di Drew	Blake Ayshford	20 October 2009
493	37	"Yesterday, Today and Tomorrow"	Marcus Cole	Louise Crane-Bowes	27 October 2009

== See also ==
- All Saints (TV series)
- List of All Saints characters
