= Dead Letter Office (film) =

1998 Australian film by John Ruane

- Theatrical release poster
- Directed by: John Ruane
- Written by: Deb Cox
- Produced by: Denise Patience
- Starring: Miranda Otto; George DelHoyo; Nicholas Bell; Georgina Naidu; Syd Brisbane
- Cinematography: Ellery Ryan
- Edited by: Denise Haratzis
- Music by: Roger Mason
- Distributed by: PolyGram Filmed Entertainment
- Release date: 20 August 1998
- Country: Australia
- Language: English
- Box office: A$268,699 (Australia)

Dead Letter Office is a 1998 Australian Romance Comedy film directed by John Ruane and written by Deb Cox, and starring Miranda Otto. The film was released in united states on October 8, 1999.

== Plot ==
"After years of having her letters to her estranged father come back as undeliverable, a young woman takes a job at a Dead Letter Office. She hopes to figure out how to locate her father. Unexpectedly, she finds a potential romance and begins to learn more about herself."

== Cast ==
- Miranda Otto as Alice Walsh
- George DelHoyo as Frank
- Nicholas Bell as Peter
- Syd Brisbane as Kevin
- Georgina Naidu as Mary
- Jane Hall as Heather
- Jillian O'Dowd as Lizzy
- Vanessa Steele as Carmen
- Guillermina Ulloa as Lucia
- Franko Milostnik as Vicente
- Mark Wilson as Young man
- Barry Otto as Gerald Hartnell
- Alicia Banit as Young Alice
- Tess Mornana as Young Alice (voice)

== Production ==
It was shot in May and June 1997.

== See also ==
- Cinema of Australia
