= List of SeaChange episodes =

SeaChange is an Australian drama television series, created by Andrew Knight and Debroah Cox, and produced by Artist Services for ABC TV during its initial run from 1998 to 2000, and subsequently, by ITV Studios Australia and Every Cloud Productions in 2019 for its revival, broadcast on Nine Network. The series stars Sigrid Thornton as Laura Gibson, a highly-successful city lawyer; following a set of tragic circumstances, she relocates to the coastal town of Pearl Bay, where she once spent a family holiday, and on a whim, takes the job as a magistrate.

During the course of the series, 47 episodes of SeaChange aired over four seasons, between 10 May 1998 and 24 September 2019.

== Series overview ==
Season	Episodes	Originally released		
Season	Episodes	First released	Last released	Network
1	13	10 May 1998	2 August 1998	ABC
2	13	28 June 1999	19 September 1999	ABC
3	13	27 August 2000	2 December 2000	ABC
4	8	6 August 2019	24 September 2019	Nine Network

== Season 1 (1998) ==
No. overall	No. in series	Title	Directed by	Written by	Original release date
1	1	"Something Rich and Strange"	Michael Carson	Andrew Knight	10 May 1998
.In just 24 hours, corporate lawyer Laura Gibson's life is decimated. She is passed up for partnership, her son is expelled and she almost kills the family cat before discovering her husband has been arrested for fraud, squandering their life savings in the process...not to mention sleeping with her sister. Desperate to escape her life, Laura accepts a job as magistrate of a small coastal town she has fond - ten-year-old - memories of. Packing her kids in the station wagon, Laura heads to Pearl Bay only to find a half collapsed connecting bridge and laconic local, Diver Dan. On belated arrival, Laura discovers the solitude beach house she bought based on memory is now a dilapidated shack in the middle of a caravan park. Yet, staring out across the spectacular view from her new home, Laura decides maybe Pearl Bay is worth a chance.
2	2	"Full Fathom Five"	Michael Carson	Deb Cox; Andrew Knight	17 May 1998
Laura and her children adjust to life in Pearl Bay, as the mayor, Bob Jelly, invites her to lunch and attempts to make it clear to her that he is a very influential individual in Pearl Bay.
3	3	"A Matter of Taste"	Ray Argall	Deb Cox	24 May 1998
Carmen, Meredith's niece arrives, pregnant and on the run from the law, having pretended she was a food journalist to get free meals from restaurants. Meredith decides to charge Carmen with not paying for a meal at the Tropical Star Hotel to keep her nearby, and Carmen is brought up before Laura. Other chefs arrive for the trial and they critique the local food. Laura takes cooking lessons from Diver Dan. Miranda decides to earn money to go back to the city to live with her father.
4	4	"The Official Story"	Ray Argall	Andrew Knight; Doug MacLeod	31 May 1998
Sergeant Grey charges Matthew Reily with driving without a license as Grey is suspicious of how Reily funds his local youth training centre. Bob Jelly decides he will join the "Here and Now" political party and goes to the youth centre with a camera crew - Reily behaves suspiciously when filmed. Rupert has his birthday and Jack, Laura's ex-husband breaches his parole conditions to visit Rupert. Laura upholds the law, which upsets Rupert, but they bond over the pool competition.
5	5	"The Fellowship of the Suit"	Ali Ali	Andrew Knight	7 June 1998
Trudi comes to Pearl Bay to make up with Laura. Trudi causes a commotion amongst Pearl Bay's menfolk, who share ownership of an Armani suit and are all keen to impress her. Laura is very angry at Trudi but hides it in public. She also hears a case involving Sergeant Grey's daughter.
6	6	"One of the Gang"	Ali Ali	Andrew Knight; Doug MacLeod	14 June 1998
A big night out on the town results in a car being driven off Pearl Bay's condemned bridge. Several of the locals are under suspicion but when Sergeant Grey finally discovers that it was Reg, the popular garbage collector, who has recently been pulled up on his third drink-driving offence. Laura finds herself in one of the greatest dilemmas she's faced since arriving in Pearl Bay.
7	7	"Stormy Weather"	Sue Brooks	Deb Cox	21 June 1998
Dorothy, Diver Dan's ex-wife, comes into town. She is suing Bob Jelly for defaming her and costing her a potential job in Port Deakin.
8	8	"My Own Sweetheart"	Sue Brooks	Deb Cox; Margaret Kelly	28 June 1998
Laura invites Diver Dan to a dinner dance, but he turns her down and shows her his unpaid fines. She sentences him to perform community service filing in her office. Karen's parents return as born-again hippies, and her father turns himself in for a past misdemeanour.
9	9	"Balls and Friggin Good Luck"	Mandy Smith	Max Dann; Andrew Knight	5 July 1998
A schoolboy football hopeful dies in an accident and Laura presides over the inquest. Rupert is affected and becomes withdrawn. Dan attempts to be a masculine role model for Rupert, but gets extremely drunk.
10	10	"The Accidental Activist"	Mandy Smith	Elizabeth Coleman; Andrew Knight; Doug MacLeod	12 July 1998
Bob's associates plan to develop Brabey Point, a famed lovers' lane. Craig accidentally opposes his father's plan. Dan and Laura talk about visiting Brabey Point.
11	11	"Love Me or Leave Me"	Paul Maloney	Luke Devenish; Deb Cox; Andrew Knight	19 July 1998
Howard writes a play and auditions are held. Heather becomes the leading lady opposite a visitor to town who she had once been involved with, and Bob suspects an affair. Laura is desperate to get out of being in the play, so Dan teaches her how to be a bad actor. Dan discovers a friend of his has a bad home life and argues with Laura that the law can't do anything to stop it.
12	12	"Perchance to Dream"	Paul Maloney	Deb Cox; Andrew Knight	26 July 1998
Rupert and Miranda convince Laura to visit and support Jack while he's going through his trial. She is offered a new job, and feels a connection with Jack again, but is uncertain about her future. Bob notices Heather is behaving strangely. Phrani supports Kevin, as Kevin's de facto Lucy is released from prison, but goes back, as Lucy is unequipped to live outside gaol.
13	13	"Sex, Death and Bridges"	Paul Maloney	Deb Cox; Andrew Knight	2 August 1998
Bob prepares to announce the repaired bridge connecting Pearl Bay to the 'big smoke' of Port Deakin. Carmen's baby is overdue and she believes something is wrong with the baby. Meredith and Harold reunite with their child, Heather. Laura and Dan decide to have sex. A storm breaks.

== Season 2 (1999) ==
No. overall	No. in series	Title	Directed by	Written by	Original release date
14	1	"If Fish Could Fly"	Ali Ali	Deb Cox	28 June 1999
Pearl Bay is recovering from week-long storms, once again closing the bridge. Kevin and Trevor return to Pearl Bay, wheelbarrow in hand, after their failed around-the-world sailing trip. Phrani tells him, mournfully, his prized Deluxe Continental caravan went over the cliff, and the occupant, a backpacker lost his prized book. Seems almost everyone is suing everyone, and with Bob Jelly's resignation, and inaction prior, the Council is faced with a slew of lawsuits, and no renewed public liability insurance. Laura and Jack exchange words, with her implying Jack doesn't know his kids, with him flinging back about "her boyfriend with the hanky round his neck" and his inappropriate behaviour. Bob is still moping and he is confronted that he doesn't know what his wife likes. Dan discovers a very special mullet in his gutters, and repeatedly offers it, in what he sees, as a romantic gesture, to a preoccupied Laura. Dan gets fed up with Laura's shame of him, and huffs off. Phrani's guilt over the Continental leads her to offer to cook for him and Trevor, to help repay him, which Kevin later regrets. Laura heads over to the Boatshed, enticing him back to her house, although her joy is short-lived, when he wakes her up for a meteorite shower in the wee-hours of the morning. Bob wakes up to a shock too- Heather is back, still upset over the news of her parents, but trying to regain some normality of her family. With Heather back, Bob gets back to council, hating Meredith and being the "Big Man", expected to deal with the claims. He ends up solving the whole mess, and is caught up in more lies, rather than admit he appropriated funds. Karen, unwisely goes along with Angus, and tries to bring out her dark side, with musical results. A quiet moment between Dan and Laura is interrupted with the kids being back early. Putting aside her pride, Laura accepts the fish and Dan.
15	2	"Vaya Con Dios To All That"	Ali Ali	Max Dann; Deb Cox; Andrew Knight	4 July 1999
Rupert tries to bring his parents back together, and Jack forces Rupert up the side of a traditional climbing rock, the failure gutting him, and leading him to run away. Again, Pearl Bay is turned down for funds from the Port Deakin Bank, condemning the shire. The appearance of Katrina Fennessy, from the Tax Department stirs up the town, and Bob. She flirts and charms Bob, and brings up the idea of a Community Bank, and a way to have control of it (investing in other people's names and buying their vote). Dan has decided he needs to be off, and offers Laura the most romantic proposition; to run away to Cuba. Laura mournfully declines, only asking him to look back when he leaves this time, leaving her to find a bowl of oranges, sweet, and fragrant, left on the table.
16	3	"Broken Hearts And Crustaceans"	Mandy Smith	Andrew Knight	11 July 1999
Pam Nugent is being harassed by "Squid" Connors, and his crab-lyriced love songs. Max "Mullet" Connors, and his wife Elena are back in town, taking up residence in the Boatshed. Laura is still reeling from Dan's leaving, so when she hears records in Dan's shed, she rushes over, but instead finds a half-naked Max and his wife Elena. Max says Dan never mentioned her, but he did offer the shed months ago, while their relationship was still together, Laura leaving, very upset. Max shrugs her off as short. Dan is off in the Galapagos, and Jack tried to cheer her up. Angus is walking on egg-shells around Laura, after Dan's leaving. Max's and his father reunion after so many years leaves Elena decidedly under-whelmed, saying he doesn't know much about the world, and didn't know about the UN or any Journalism Awards Max won. Katrina has finalized the Community bank, and Bob puts it to the town, with everyone investing their own little nest eggs. She then leaves town, but not before kissing Bob passionately with promises of local affluence and community stature with the new bank. Max doesn't waste time stirring up trouble for our favorite shire president. Heather tries to broach the subject of her real parents with Bob, but pulls up. Laura has been a mess in court, calling recesses, sobbing in her chambers and generally holding up poor Angus. Laura develops a friendship with Elena after she becomes the court child psychologist, and Laura unwittingly pours out her sorrows over Dan, Jack and Trudy. Max starts poking his nose into the bank, and smells a rat. Turns out he has done some investigating, and the bank is a hoax. Elena tries to talk him around, but is only after a short, blunt word, from his brother that he accepts Pam doesn't want him. Bob is still panicked, with Katrina's phone disconnected, and her office building non-existent. Squid is at court, and Max finally finds out that the hysteric woman at the Boatshed the other night was in fact, "Diver's Judge". The "Pocket-sized magistrate" ordered Squid to keep clear of Pam, after an impassioned, and very much stolen, speech from Pushkin. Max meets her in her chambers after the case and admits that he omitted the fact that while Diver never mentioned her by name, he did call her "His Judge" all the time. Len gives Elena a gift of a lovely teapot she admired during the failed visit, claiming he was going to "chuck it", to which Max responds it was his mothers. Len then surprises her by recalling when the UN was formed, and that one of the drafters, won the same writing award Max did. Bob staggers home to Heather who is certain Bob knows about her parents, and blurts out she is sorry about it. Bob, who had no idea, is horrified.
17	4	"Sink Or Swim"	Mandy Smith	Andrew Knight; Sue Hore	18 July 1999
Bob is cornered, and faced with disgrace, records a suicide tape and goes to jump off the bridge. Laura is sick of Jack lingering, and his offer to fix the blinds is unimpressive. Rupert tries to help with the money troubles he overhears, and asks Trevor for a share in his paper rounds, but ends up tossing most of them under his bed. The town is starting to feel the pinch of lack of money, waiting for the bank to open. Soon the whole town is running on barter and eyes begin to turn to Bob for explanations. Max meanwhile, has been still investigating, and turns out Katrina was forced to go on leave pending inquiry. Max and Sergeant Grey join forces, and bring the scheming redhead in to face the music and the wrath of the near-bankrupt shire. Elena invites Laura to dinner, joking she should bring Jack along, so she doesn't have to feed him. When Max is told, he flatly disapproves of dinner with "the midget magistrate". The Tropical Star has turned into a barter market, spades alongside poppadoms. Katrina, in jail, hugs Bob, sobbing and slyly guilt trips and hints she might drop his name to the police, unless he helps her and gets her out. A mob descends on the Jelly house, and Bob's facade is cracking. The dinner was terse, and Max tactlessly asks why Laura and Jack broke up. An empty court leaves Laura wondering if it is a public holiday. Max informs her everyone is grilling Bob on the bank. The whole town turns out for the trial, Katrina playing it for all she is worth, condemns Bob, saying he is paying her surety. The locals decide they need to keep an eye on her, and follow her around, with Kevin losing her. Griff's radio channel is on the races, (something he has been charged with) so is no help whatsoever. Bob and Katrina meet in secret, and Katrina lies to Bob, saying she needs to go to Vanuatu, to recover the money. She asks Bob to go too, and have an affair with her, before kissing him again. At home Heather tells him his reputation don't mean a blink to her, but it does to him, and she wants to support him, and he decides not to run. He goes to Sergeant Grey and lets him know of Katrina's plans. Max has found that Katrina did a severe under-audit for a company owner, in exchange for insider trading information. Max says though, that if they become involved, the town may never see its money again, and it would be wiser to encourage Miss Fennessy to sell her shares, and return the towns money now, the town would make three times its original investment. Max wants to pass it off as part of Bob's original plan. When Graham questioned his choice, Max says he needs Bob on the ropes, not the canvas. Katrina is let go, Graham letting her know she should never come back. Back at the pub, everyone is celebrating, and Bob gloats to Max, who just quietly smiles. Later that night, Laura heads over to the Boatshed, to find it utterly empty, like all the buildings so far that day whenever she turns up. About to leave, she sees Max appear up the stairs, and begins to give him a dressing down about her courtroom being interfered with, when she stops short seeing Max's face. Max then quietly, calmly says Elena died an hour ago. Her brain aneurysm burst, something they had expected, just not so soon. Laura slowly makes her way back to her house, in a horrified daze. Jack meets her at the door where she begs him to hold her.
18	5	"Head For Water"	Sue Brooks	Stuart McDonald	25 July 1999
An episode of mourning; A great local is missed by all, and their death hits home hard. Laura is a little bemused it is, in fact a dog, and finds herself sitting in on its murder trial. Angus mourns his surfing sandbar, that the storm washed away, and Karen worries she might have to repeat Brabey Point in order to keep him in Pearl Bay. Max stubbornly refuses to show any outpouring of grief, brushing her off and joking about it. Laura tries her own brand of comforting, flowers and stammered dinner invitations. Laura is dumbfounded the whole town is so caught up in Alfonso Domenico Jones' death, forgetting Max's loss. One of the few who seems to notice is Meredith, when she comes across Max trying to Goodwill her suitcase, and Kevin, who brings it up at the Council meeting, fleetingly. Carmen returns, having heard about a journalist living in the Boatshed, and heads over immediately, and begins to badger him, and decides Max is going to do a local paper, "The Pearl Bay Oyster", he halfheartedly agrees, to get rid of her. Bob meanwhile, it trying to push through the Jelly Aquatic Swimming Complex, which Max joking sounds like a psychological disorder. Then Kevin suggests, to Bob's annoyance it should be named after local legend Len Connors, a long-distance record-breaker swimmer. Max sees it as a chance to divert himself, annoy Bob but depriving him of yet another public structure bearing his silly name, and drunkenly gives a big speech about how it is an honor. He throws himself into getting the pool named after his father, simply to spite Bob, printing off articles mocking Bob. Meredith tries to comfort Angus over his sandbar, to no avail. He cheers up when Meredith lets him know the sandbar isn't gone, just further down the beach. Max realizes that, after a word from Carmen, he didn't care about the pool bearing his dad's name, and that his was just avoiding his grief. he still ends up to find a way to tick off Bob though, proposing "The Alfonso Dominico Antonio Jones Memorial Baths", almost unanimously. In the end, it was probably worse that a dog was chosen over Jelly, to his mind. A letter is found for Laura, from Elena. She reads it while watching Max swim through the waves, further and further out.
19	6	"The House That Jack Built"	Sue Brooks	Andrew Knight; Doug MacLeod	1 August 1999
When Quid's stock of crabs, including some Coconut Crabs escape, the town is thrown into pandemonium. A return of an old flame of Max's re-ignites trouble for him. Bob Jelly is dismayed at the lack of sex in his marriage, while Heather points out their marriage has bigger problems than a 39-day dry-spell, and suggests going to marriage counseling, with Barry Boston. Barry says the relationship needs intimacy, and to find out what she wants. Bob thinks its ridiculous taking advice from a gay man. Laura is still trying to force Max into an outward show of grief, and begins a campaign of "meals on wheels, on heels", giving him endless casseroles, chutneys and curries, with Max retaliating with gifts of kitchen utensils. Max says it must be obligation, and Laura agrees, before leaving a jar she bought from the Hippy Markets. Max chuckles to Carmen when his mum died, the casserole brigade moved in, but there were never any chutney people. Carmen brings up the paper again, and Max shuts her down, sending her off with some chutney, saying she'll give it to the Hippy markets, to which he cries out not to, as it will only come back there. The crabs keep on disrupting life, throwing the court into panic. Max's visiting friend, Paula's has a terrible secret and a visit from her new friends re-arranges the Boathouse, and Max's face. Turns out Paula is part of a drug-running operation, using the crabs to hide them, and tried to cheat her partners. She tries to skip town, but Sergeant Grey pulls her up. Max is disgusted with her. Jack tries to entice Laura back into his life with promises of her dream home. She finds out, despite his pleas for her return, he had been involved still with Trudy, four months ago, and gotten her pregnant. She returns home to find a pair of tongs on her doormat, and flies over to Max's, and flies off at him for his jibes, before sobbing about the news of Trudy. Bob and Heather's spark re-ignites over a romantic dinner, while at another dinner; Max and Laura, Laura admits Elena was who asked her to look after him. When Kevin and Trevor are talking on the beach it is revealed that Kevin in fact sent the tongs in hopes of cheering her up.
20	7	"Looking Forward to the Past"	Steve Jodrell	Andrew Knight; Tim Pye	8 August 1999
The Pork Festival is on the horizon and Max is planning on leaving, right up until the new sponsor's representative runs him off the road, and he is stuck in town for the court case. The rep. also has her own agenda, coming back in hopes of having Angus back in her life, despite the terrible secret she held. Karen has an inkling about what might be going on, and fears she may lose Angus. Bob has suspiciously found someone willing to sponsor a small towns failing local festival, and while Max is stuck there, he pokes his nose into it, and turns out Bob offered the council owned Boatshed. Laura tries to make Lemon Butter for the festival, and her attempts fail, until she breaks out Dan's cookbook he left behind for her, causing her to break down over his naming the Sticky Date Pudding after her. She is still maintaining the frosty reception for Jack, and the kids feel fed up. Laura is uncomfortable with Meridith's request to judge the Pork Queen contest, and gets on her bad side when she agrees with Bob over the idea of a sponsor, and the ending of the Pork Queen, on Tony's Hot Rib's demands. She ends up agreeing, to her regret. In the end, Carmen comes up with an idea to unite everyone behind the festival. And Karen is overjoyed, winning the Pork Queen. Laura wins the Lemon Butter competition, but her joy is short-lived, when Max informs her that her hero Dan's recipe, which won 7 times, is in fact Max's mothers.
21	8	"Manna From Heaven"	Steve Jodrell	Andrew Knight; Deb Cox	15 August 1999
The town has a terrible secret, one that is quite literally eating at the town. Kevin's dreams haunt him, and one day he comes face to face with them. Mabel Pearson, (Tenzin Jetsuna now, a Buddhist), an old local returns, and leaves Meredith wondering if her old friend would forgive her, and if her presence will bring out the truth about her daughter. Meredith, shockingly forgets a day, and it seems to hit a raw nerve. Max hears out and can't help but snoop. Bob, much to his dislike, has to deal with Harold as his lawyer when he sues a pest-control man for failure to eradicate Bora from five properties. Mid-way through the case, a beam falls down, nearly hitting Bob. Turns out, a decent chunk of the town was built from wood stolen from a shipwreck, from Tenzin shipping over supplies to build a temple in Pearl Bay. Max says the town really ought to repay her, by going to her lecture, and making a sizable donation. The talk of truth has people admitting their past lies, and Kevin decides it is best to tell Tenzin, when Heather can bear it no more, and tells about her birth parents, before promptly fainting. Later, when talked to by Meredith, she chuckles, saying she knew all along, but some truths are more important than others, and there was still a little Mabel left in Tenzin. Laura is questioning what she believes in, and ask Max, but his cynical answer just leaves her storming off. He later tells her, he believes in swimming, that it gives his life meaning. When Laura jokingly says she isn't a good swimmer, Max chuckles, saying perhaps he life has no meaning. She realizes, she believes in her kids, and feels quite contended.
22	9	"Playing With Fire"	Brendan Maher	Stuart McDonald	22 August 1999
A heat wave grips Pearl Bay leaving everyone feeling hot and bothered. Some fireworks set off surprises everyone (least of all Max, who hides under his desk) and leads to the town hall being blown up, and a ensuing court case. Laura notices a lot of the towns men acting oddly (including Sergeant Grey, Griff, Kevin and Angus), and finds a small degree of amusement from it, but is mostly confused and off-balance. Desperate to escape the heat, Laura goes for a midnight swim off Max's boardwalk. The two end up engaging in a game of Marco Polo. The two nearly kiss, with Laura abruptly leaving. Kevin proposes to Phrani, who promptly turns him down, saying she wants him, but does not want to marry him, and that marriage is not for her. It turns out her previous husband tried to kill her, by Dowry Death (or Bride Burning). Phrani suggest her and Kevin begin a journey together, before physically jumping in the deep end. Idle hands get to work, with Trevor and Rupert printing off plans to build a rocket. Miranda gets hit by first love with the tattooed fire-twirler, Felix Lewinsky, despite the fact he is arrested for blowing up the hall with the fireworks he was hired to bring and set off for the town jubilee. He creates her name in flames, the two embracing on the beach. A tense family dinner with the Jellys, Meredith and Harold turns sour, Bob calling what they did as a "tawdry little grope", leaving Heather distressed. Another dinner leaves Max on top of Laura, although not for reasons one might think; her skirt caught on fire. Long after the flames have gone out, they still remain thus, until in the end, Laura suggest they get up. A disappointed Max says it was nice to hold her, but still slowly releases her, and she goes home. While Laura is giving Miranda a talk about how her "new friend" is probably going to jail, Rupert announces the rock is going to be launched. Everyone dives out of the house, and the police are called to disarm it. The arrive, with Felix (an explosives expert), saying it has to be launched, being too touchy to disarm. When asked how they managed to get hold of gunpowder, they admit they took some from the hall, and moved boxes, which put the detonators too close to the explosives. With Felix innocent, he leaves town, leaving Miranda a little sad, but knew it would be the case with a guy like him. The town's 150th anniversary is celebrated within the Tropical Star with sparklers, and the cool change, returning the town to normal.
23	10	"Not Such Great Expectations"	Brendan Maher	Chris Hawkshank; Andrew Knight	29 August 1999
Laura begins her tradition of bringing Max a cup of tea after his swim. Bob tries to rope Craig into real-estate, following in his Uncle Jim Jelly's footsteps, when he is failing maths. When inspecting a place for damages, and measuring it, Craig feels even more useless, when the measurements don't match up, and stumbles across a terrible family secret; Jim Jelly was a cheat, taking all the money from the Eastern Ridge Project and was going to skip out, and leave his partner, Theo Lawrence, to face the music. They had a tussle, and struck his head, it killing him. Unable to face it, Theo has been pretending he is still alive, sending old postcards home (smudging the postmark dates), and hiding Jim behind an extra wall in his house. Hardly a wonder Theo is so guilt-ridden. Rupert's failing grades leave Laura unimpressed, and while she tries to motivate him to improve, he says he doesn't need it to become rich and successful. Laura is confronted a child case, where the defendant cares for his sister, and was caught stealing a bike. Laura decides everyone deserves a second chance, and gives the boy court funds for a bike, upon learning he needs one for a job, to help his mother with money.
24	11	"Kitty Litter"	Paul Moloney	Andrew Knight	5 September 1999
Harold's estranged wife comes up in court over custody of a cat she and her neighbour share.The ownership of the cat has to be temporarily moved for the case but as people shift the cat, it ends with allergic Max. VERY pregnant Trudi is living with Jack, which means Laura won't allow the kids over there, causing more arguments between the Gibsons. Ultimately, Laura does not resolve her differences, but a very drunk and tired Max falls asleep on Laura's bed.
25	12	"Other People's Opinions"	Paul Moloney	Andrea Denholm; Doug MacLeod	12 September 1999
Speculation about Phrani occurs, when her old "friend" arrives in town and stories fly everywhere. Love between Max and Laura and Angus and Karen (along with Phrani and Kevin) are the main factors of the episode while the town learn that they have to live their own lives and not be worried about other people's opinions
26	13	"Law And Order"	Deb Cox; Paul Moloney	Deb Cox	19 September 1999
Conflicts are overflowing in the town. The courthouse is being closed, Meredith doesn't know what to do, everyone wants to know about Laura and Max and the list goes on. Without warning, the town knows everything. In a revelating meeting, the town's secrets are all brought out. Heather and Meredith tell all and Trudi reveals her baby isn't Jack's. Meredith begins a siege at the courthouse, where the town's residents inside say a gunwoman is holding them hostage. Laura stays in her office thinking it is real while Karen, Angus, Max and a small group of our favourites sit in the courtroom enjoying a sing-a-long. When the demands are met, the only problem is to get away with it. Karen decides to leave Pearl Bay and travel, much to Angus' dismay. Phrani and Kevin become closer and Bob and Bucket blow up the bridge. The town waits for the aftermath, not sure what it will mean

== Season 3 (2000) ==
No. overall	No. in series	Title	Directed by	Written by	Original release date
27	1	"Best Laid Plans..."	Steve Jodrell	Deb Cox	27 August 2000
Bob is distraught after the council has been fired. Worried that he will be involved, Bob must track down the Port Deakin mayor. Karen returns from her travels to split up with Angus and find a new job. Angus takes some time off from his role as court clerk. Max must fight to keep his boatshed from being destroyed.
28	2	"How Much Greener was My Neighbour's Valley"	Steve Jodrell	Andrew Knight	3 September 2000
With the Fire Brigade dance looming, Laura struggles to get a date. Max is taken with the new Latin dancer and even Griff has a date in Karen. Jules is arrested for theft, much to Heather's dismay, and the dance is the fire of everyone's emotions. Max and Laura however seem to be getting on well—dancing on the pier in the moonlight.
29	3	"Hungi Jury"	Mandy Smith	Andrew Knight and Sherri McIver	10 September 2000
Laura joins the Women's Auxiliary to be a part of the town's women. Meredith and Karen try to stop her. The newly elected president - Vicki Drury, wife of Dave, is opposed to Heather and her "minions" – Phrani and the like, but Laura joins anyway. At the big sporting event, Laura gets in extreme trouble for what she does. Vicki, however, is the butt of everyone's joke when her husband is arrested for faking a burglary. Heather decides she should be a martyr and get the women of the town really together. Angus discovers he is too predictable and changes his timetable, causing Kevin to get into all sorts of troubles. Max and Carmen go on a stakeout but it ends up turning into a night of love.
30	4	"Bonfire of the VCRs"	Mandy Smith	Graeme Koetsveld and Deb Cox	17 September 2000
After Max and Carmen's affair, Carmen goes to the city for a job interview. The whole town thinks he took advantage of her and shuns him. Laura has no idea though. Bob convinces the town to boycott Port Deakin, causing Phrani to be at a loss for supplies. The town has to pitch in to help. Morton Tregonning is the only person who Max thinks can help - with a vision of the Robert James Jelly Tunnel connecting Port Deakin and Pearl Bay - much better than a bridge! Bob is sucked in and cancels the boycott. Sergeant Grey meets a group of hippies who are fighting over television. The leader is Harold's nephew. In a court battle, Laura is put to the test. Carmen returns, deciding to take the job because she knows Max really loves Laura.
31	5	"Pipeline"	David Cameron	Deb Cox	8 October 2000
Angus takes time off court to find himself, leaving Laura overwhelmed by paperwork. A court reviewer, Warwick Munro (played by Shaun Micallef), arrives in town and is charmed by Laura. Max promises to tell Warwick a secret about Laura. Angus, riding on his custom-made surfboard, is approached by a business associate of Mark Richards to manufacture more of the same design, but the board is stolen, and he steals it back, ending up in Pearl Bay court in the stands. He wins the case and then surfs with Mark Richards. Warwick and Laura have dinner together, and Warwick tells her that he likes her, even if she is an alcoholic. Laura knows this is one of Max's tricks.
32	6	"Adversely Possessed"	David Cameron	Andrew Knight	15 October 2000
Griff is being kicked out of his home and moves into the Jelly's house. Laura tries to help him using a law of adverse possession. As Laura continues to see Warwick, the town grows to like him and wonders what Max will do. Trudi is back in the town and Rupert is fond of her child. However, Laura is not impressed and still will have nothing to do with her. Kevin and Phrani continue to work on their relationship after moving in does nothing.
33	7	"Blowing in the Wind"	Stuart McDonald	Stuart McDonald	22 October 2000
An old friend of Max's arrives in town but no-one seems to like him. He is locked up for breaking Grey's trumpet. As music fills the jail all weekend, Grey and the prisoner have to bond to survive. Laura and Max consider their friendship and the entire town seems to be contemplating the future. Grey is rejected from the police band to his dismay. The town is left wondering if their lives are really good or just blowing in the wind.
34	8	"I Name Thee Bay of Pearls"	Stuart McDonald	Andrew Knight and Andrea Denholm	5 November 2000
Laura's mother, June, arrives in town during a geriatric traffic crime spree. June's suspiciously sudden appearance is more of an inconvenience than a pleasure for Laura, who is too caught up in her own life to sense her mother's sadness. When Laura eventually discovers her father's declining health has forced June to place him into respite care, she is forced to reassess her priorities. Max begins to spend more time with his father and his friends, learning of Pearl Bay's real, great, textured history. However, Bob has his own interpretation of the town's past and plans to turn Pearl Bay into Ye Olde Pearl Bay: a sure-fire tourism hit. Max plays along with Bob's redundant plan for his own entertainment. When judgement day arrives and the city tourist agents descend on the town, instead of letting Bob hang himself, Max turns an inevitable disastrous slide show into a tribute to the older citizens of Pearl Bay. Meanwhile Harold feels the grip of old age tightening. His frustration is worsened by representing elderly drivers caught in the recent, unexplained traffic crime spree. Meredith reminds him being comfortable with yourself defies age, presenting him with a nude portrait of herself. One look at the picture and Harold is young again.
35	9	"Eminent Persons"	Ben Lewin	Andrew Knight and Hannie Rayson	12 November 2000
Laura's ego is battered when she is not chosen to speak during Eminent Persons Week at Rupert's school. Laura heads off to the principal's office under the guise she is concerned about her son's education. She should be; her visit brings Rupert's report card fraud to the attention of Ms Philby. But perhaps worst of all for Laura, Warwick has asked her to marry him. The corrupt former Port Deakin councillors are finally brought to trial before Laura. Max is suspicious as to who pays the councillors' entourage of legal eagles - headed by an old associate of Laura's, Hilary Tonks Q.C. Naturally, when Max and Hilary meet at Laura's dinner party, Max can't help but stir things up. An emotional argument ensues catapulting Laura into accepting Warwick's proposal. Meanwhile, Heather is excited to learn she is the recipient of a prestigious real estate award. When Bob mocks her legitimate success, Heather packs up and leaves—for good. Bob plummets to rock bottom when Morton threatens Mr Jelly's past crimes could come back to haunt him—in the form of a lengthy prison sentence.
36	10	"Checks and Balances"	Ben Lewin	Deb Cox and Andrew Knight	19 November 2000
Kevin is acting strangely. He heads out of town without Phrani, won't speak more than three words at once and most worrying of all—he's wearing slacks. Phrani's worrying is appeased when Kevin's sister, country singer Suzy, arrives in Pearl Bay to claim their recently dead father's silver guitar. The case ends up before Laura where Suzy's adamant belief her dad was a member of the "Master's Apprentices" is challenged—and eventually proven correct, resulting in a cliff side tribute concert. Laura is reluctant to spread the news of her impending marriage but she is keen to sever all legal ties with Jack. However, when Jack pays Laura what he owes, she is left feeling unexpectedly hollow. Karen, too, is eager to even the scales. After Karen reveals her continental infidelity to Angus, she insists he has an affair to compensate—while Meredith has her own way to keep Harold on his toes. Construction work finally begins on the tunnel site, arousing Max's curiosity. When Max doesn't keep his discoveries to himself, Morton pulls a few of his very long and very connected strings, revealing Max as the writer behind 'Still Waters'. The town alienate Max immediately but things could be worse—he could be Bob. Wifeless and facing a lengthy prison sentence, Mr Jelly decides to end it all, a hard task with only three sleeping pills. However, Bob's fortunes change when Morton offers to back him in his quest for mayor. Bob would be thrilled if he wasn't comatose.
37	11	"Love in the Time of Coleridge"	Ian Watson	Hannie Rayson and Andrea Denholm	29 November 2000
While Laura is on a one-way track to the altar, Max announces he has accepted a lucrative job with an international newspaper and will be leaving Pearl Bay – and Laura – behind. Of all things, a trivia night question causes Max to reassess his life. Max is reminded of his likeness to the mariner in Colerdige's 'The Rime of the Ancient Mariner', who shot an albatross, his potential saviour. In other words, Max realises he should stop making a habit of sabotaging his own happiness. Meanwhile, Bob launches his campaign with Morton at the reins. Mr Jelly receives female attention from his forward image consultant, Astrid Moore, prompting Bob to warn Heather she'll let a tiger out to play if she doesn't take him back. Heather knows Bob couldn't cheat on him no more than she could on him. Her theory is proved when a terrified Bob bails out a restaurant toilet window to escape Astrid's advances. Trudi finds herself in court—as Vietnamese interpreter. As the case unravels, the defendant Van Nguyen (played by comedian Anh Do) is revealed to be Lewis' father. He traded identities with a criminal and risks imprisonment just to see Trudi again and beg her to return home with him. Desperation drives Karen, too, when in a last-ditch attempt to win Angus back, she learns to surf. At the eleventh hour Max confesses his true feelings for Laura but his words are soon upstaged by their careering downriver in an out-of-control dinghy. However, after a champagne-drenched hen's night Laura, again, finds herself careering out of control—by foot, to the shack at the end of the beach.
38	12	"To Thine Own Self Be Relatively True"	Ian Watson	Matt Cameron and Andrew Knight	2 December 2000
Laura desperately wants to be honest with Warwick about her night with Max, but the moment constantly eludes her. To compound on her anxiety, Jack, distraught since Trudi left him, refers to Laura as the 'good', faithful sister. Work is no help either. Barry Boston and his ex-lover, Ari, are in battle trading accusations of deception and passionless love. With the rocky Jelly marriage creating bad PR, Morton threatens Heather into supporting Bob to keep face. However, newly independent Heather can not be swayed and throws her support behind the new candidate on the block - Meredith. To add to Bob's woes Craig goes through a sexual crisis, closely observed by a bemused Miranda. Yet despite the setbacks, Bob's campaign rolls on with Morton in the driving seat. Max's investigations reveal Morton plans to turn Pearl Bay into a nuclear waste dump. An incredulous Bob goes public and withdraws his nomination. Meanwhile poor Karen bravely accepts her fate as the 'dude bride' at her forthcoming surf wedding while Laura struggles to escape hers. It isn't until Max reveals his love for Laura to Warwick that Laura is forced to pull the plug on the big day. In an uncharacteristically callous gesture, Warwick leaves a little memento behind to remind Laura of his broken hearted departure—rotten fish has never smelt sweeter.
39	13	"Half Life"	Ian Watson	Deb Cox and Andrew Knight	9 December 2000
Laura must deal with the fallout of her cancelled wedding whilst Angus and Karen prepare for their big day. Laura's job as magistrate is under threat as she is forced to choose between her employment and defending her daughter Miranda who was arrested while protesting at the tunnel. Meredith suffers a stroke as everything in Pearl Bay comes to a head for the last time. The community relies on Bob to take Meredith's environmental policy and run for council which means that Max and Angus have to spend many hours educating Bob about her platform. Somehow at the last minute Bob pulls it together and delivers an impressive speech in front of the gallery of press Max organised to be there. Morton Tregonning's plans are foiled when seismic shifts result in the tunnel washing away into the sea. Karen gets the beautiful wedding of her dreams. Meredith awakens from her coma. Laura discovers that she is pregnant and tells Max.

== Season 4 (2019) ==
No. overall	No. in season	Title	Directed by	Written by	Original release date	Aus. viewers
40	1	"Back Where We Belong"	Wayne Blair	Deb Cox	6 August 2019	910,000
After losing her job in Africa, former magistrate Laura Gibson returns to Pearl Bay to visit her daughter. But after two decades, Pearl Bay has changed in ways that will challenge everything Laura believes about life, love and family.
41	2	"Magic in the Moonlight"	Wayne Blair	Elizabeth Coleman	13 August 2019	630,000
Laura tries to convince Miranda to keep her newborn baby. Fin reveals his romantic side to Miranda during the full moon. Laura is shunned by the people of Pearl Bay after she orders Ben to close his pub.
42	3	"Mother of all Dilemmas"	Kevin Carlin	Michael Miller	20 August 2019	680,000
Miranda's world is rocked when her half-sister makes a surprise return to Pearl Bay. Laura is heartbroken over Anna's plans to adopt baby Joe.
43	4	"A Chair, a Seahorse and an Incompetent Crim"	Kevin Carlin	Jamie Browne & Sam Carroll	27 August 2019	650,000
Stella's secret plan to save Pearl Bay has dire results for Miranda and Fin. Bob Jelly feels the heat when his business partner gets out of prison.
44	5	"Hope and Heartbreak"	Corrie Chen	Elizabeth Coleman	3 September 2019	643,000
Miranda is desperate to hide her romantic past from Fin. Laura helps Ben mend his broken heart and rediscover his love of Pearl Bay. Kevin's dreams come true when a past love returns to Pearl Bay.
45	6	"The Art of Fishing"	Corrie Chen	Josh Mapleston & Deb Cox	10 September 2019	644,000
Fin helps Miranda with her dream of starting a marine centre. Laura's life is in crisis when Ben's ex-wife applies for her job as Magistrate.
46	7	"It's Kissing Time"	Peter Templeman	Ian Meadows and Deb Cox	17 September 2019	599,000
Fin helps Miranda with her dream of starting a marine centre. Laura's life is in crisis when Ben's ex-wife applies for her job as Magistrate.
47	8	"Love Will Find a Way"	Peter Templeman	Elizabeth Coleman and Deb Cox	24 September 2019	529,000
Laura, Miranda and Bob Jelly join forces to save Pearl Bay from destruction. Miranda is forced to confront her true feelings for Fin.
