= Amanda Higgs =

Australian producer, writer and executive

Amanda Higgs is an Australian producer, writer and executive best known for her work in TV.

She co-created The Secret Life of Us and produced the first three series. She was a drama executive at ABC.

== Select filmography ==
- Water Rats (1998–99) - script editor
- The Secret Life of Us (2001–03) - co-creator, producer
- Bed of Roses (2008–10) - executive producer
- The Time of Our Lives (2013–14) - producer
- Dog Park (2026) - co-creator
