= Steve Knapman =

Australian television producer

Steven Knapman
- Occupation: Producer

Steve Knapman is an Australian television producer known for his work on several notable television series, including Wildside, White Collar Blue, East West 101, and The Strip. Knapman has been recognised for his contributions to the police drama genre, successfully marketing it to an international audience. He produced several miniseries for public broadcasting networks such as the ABC and the SBS. He was the producer of the 1992 television drama series The Leaving of Liverpool, which won the Most Outstanding Telemovie or Mini-Series award at the 1993 Logie Awards.
