= Louise Bowes =

Australian writer

Louise Bowes (née Crane) is an Australian television scriptwriter.

Bowes was born in Marayong and attended Blacktown Girls High School. In her early twenties, while studying medicine, Bowes took a job as a researcher on A Country Practice, where she eventually worked her way up to the script department. She has worked as a writer and script editor on a number of television dramas, including All Saints, Murder Call, Water Rats, and McLeod's Daughters. She is the current Series Script Executive for soap opera Home and Away. Bowes has received several nominations for her work at the Australian Writers' Guild Awards.
