= SeaChange =

Australian television series

- Also known as: SeaChange: Paradise Reclaimed (2019)
- Genre: Comedy drama
- Created by: Andrew Knight; Deborah Cox
- Written by: Andrew Knight; Deborah Cox; Doug MacLeod; Margaret Kelly; Max Dann; Elizabeth Coleman; Luke Devenish
- Starring: Sigrid Thornton; David Wenham; William McInnes; Kevin Harrington; John Howard; Tom Long; Kerry Armstrong
- Composer: Richard Pleasance
- Country of origin: Australia
- Original language: English
- No. of series: 4
- No. of episodes: 47 (List of episodes)

Production
- Executive producers: Sue Masters (ABC); Andrew Knight; Peter Beilby; Andrea Denholm
- Producer: Sally Ayre-Smith
- Production locations: Victoria; Australia; New South Wales, Australia (various)
- Editor: Chris Branagan
- Production companies: Artist Services (1998–2000); ITV Studios Australia (2019); Every Cloud Productions (2019)

Original release
- Network: ABC
- Release: 10 May 1998 – 25 November 2000
- Network: Nine Network
- Release: 6 August – 24 September 2019

SeaChange is an Australian television series that ran from 1998 to 2000 on the ABC and in 2019 on the Nine Network. It was created by Andrew Knight and Deborah Cox and starred Sigrid Thornton, David Wenham, William McInnes, John Howard, Tom Long, Kevin Harrington, and Kerry Armstrong. The director was Michael Carson.

== Premise ==
Laura Gibson (Sigrid Thornton), a high-flying city lawyer, is prompted to undergo a sea change with her children Miranda and Rupert after her husband is arrested for fraud and is found to have had an affair with her sister. Laura becomes the magistrate for the small coastal town of Pearl Bay. The town is isolated from the rest of the world since the local bridge was destroyed in one of the natural disasters common to Pearl Bay. Although they initially miss the city, the family comes to love the town and its many colourful characters, and they also enjoy having more quality time with each other.

== Cast ==
=== Main ===
- Sigrid Thornton – Laura Gibson
- Cassandra Magrath – Miranda Gibson (Season 1–3)
- David Wenham – Daniel Della Bosca ('Diver Dan') (Season 1–2)
- William McInnes – Max Connors
- John Howard – Bob Jelly
- Kerry Armstrong – Heather Jelly
- Kevin Harrington – Kevin Findlay
- Kate Atkinson – Karen Miller (Season 1–3)
- Tom Long – Angus Kabiri (Season 1–3)
- Brooke Satchwell – Miranda Gibson (Season 4)
- Dan Wyllie – Ben Russo (Season 4)
- Darren McMullen – Findlay Knox (Season 4)
- Katrina Milosevic – Sergeant Anna Kazan (Season 4)
- Kate Lister – Lillian Liano (Season 4)
- Alex Tarrant – Zac Bell (Season 4)
- Wayne Blair – Riley Bolt (Season 4)
- Kamil Ellis – Stone Bolt (Season 4)

=== Recurring ===
- Bruce Alexander – Sergeant Graham Grey (Season 1–3)
- Jill Forster – Meredith Monahan (Season 1–3)
- Alan Cassell – Harold Fitzwalter (Season 1–3)
- Paul English – Jack Gibson (Season 1)
- Patrick Dickson – Jack Gibson (Season 2–3)
- Alice Garner – Carmen 'Lois Lane' Blake (Season 1–3)
- Kane McNay – Rupert Gibson (Season 1–3)
- Christopher Lyons – Trevor Findlay (Season 1–3)
- Georgina Naidu – Phrani Gupta
- Cameron Nugent – Craig Jelly (Season 1–3)
- Bryony Price – Jules Jelly (Season 1–3)
- Emily Wiseman – Jules Jelly (Season 4)
- Brett Swain – Griff (Season 1–3)
- Ella Newton – Stella Connors (Season 4)

=== Guests ===
- Alex Menglet as Krzysztof (1 episode)
- Costas Kilias as Dave (1 episode)
- Denise Scott as Wilhelmina Seagull (1 episode)
- Elspeth Ballantyne as Coral Kiss (2 episodes)
- Gary Waddell as Foreman (2 episodes)
- Greg Stone as Matthew Reilley (1 episode)
- Jonny Pasvolsky as Head Waiter (1 episode)
- Julia Blake as Tenzin Jetsunma (1 episode)
- Kick Gurry as Jerome (1 episode)
- Kym Gyngell as Dennis Dreeble (1 episode)
- Lesley Baker as Mrs Chatham (1 episode)
- Ling-Hsueh Tang as Clara Russo (2 episodes)
- Mark Mitchell as Morton Tregonning (7 episodes)
- Marty Fields as Mitchell Chatham (1 episode)
- Mary-Anne Fahey as Kerry Philby (1 episode)
- Peter Curtin as Port Deakin Mayor (1 episode)
- Russell Kiefel as Ian Cameron (1 episode)
- Steve Bisley as Gavin Taylor (1 episode)
- Steven Vidler as The Ghost (1 episode)
- Tiriel Mora as Derek Brewer (1 episode)
- Tony Nikolakopoulos as Rodney (1 episode)

== Series overview ==
Season	Episodes	Originally released		
Season	Episodes	First released	Last released	Network
1	13	10 May 1998	2 August 1998	ABC
2	13	28 June 1999	19 September 1999	ABC
3	13	27 August 2000	2 December 2000	ABC
4	8	6 August 2019	24 September 2019	Nine Network

Season 1

In the opening episode, "Something Rich and Strange", we are introduced to Laura Gibson, a high-flying corporate lawyer. In one day, her life falls apart: she loses out on a partnership at work, and discovers that her husband has been arrested for fraud and that her sister Trudi (Fiona Corke) is having an affair with him. On a whim, she takes a job as a magistrate in the small seaside town of Pearl Bay, where she once had a holiday with her family during happier times.

In Pearl Bay, she meets a cast of colourful characters: Meredith Monahan, the woman who can remember every single event that has happened in town during her lifetime; Meredith's longtime lover and town lawyer/drunk, Harold; strapping surfer and court clerk Angus; his girlfriend (and would-be fiancee), police officer Karen; her superior Sergeant Grey; unsophisticated caravan park manager and handyman, Kevin; Kevin's son Trevor; clever Indian shop-keeper Phrani, later to be Kevin's lover; local layabout Griff; Meredith's niece, the wandering Carmen; corrupt and scheming real estate agent and shire president Bob Jelly; his loyal trophy wife Heather; and their children Craig and Jules.

While Laura's children, Rupert and Miranda, struggle to get used to their new life, Laura attempts to fit in, despite their run-down house and the eccentric court cases. Both helping and hindering her is Diver Dan, the enigmatic cafe owner/ferryman/chef with no ambition but a curious and colourful past, with whom she soon strikes up a relationship.

The first series ends with a series of climaxes involving Carmen's pregnancy, the discovery of Meredith and Harold's long-lost daughter; and a turning point in Laura and Dan's relationship.

After a successful first series of 13 episodes, the ABC asked for more.

Season 2

David Wenham opted not to renew his contract, so, two episodes into the second series, Diver Dan leaves Pearl Bay for the Galapagos Islands. In his place comes old friend Max Connors and wife Elena (Doris Younane). Max has much to deal with, having left the town years earlier and leaving his family. His wife's sudden death stuns the town. Storm damage in the aftermath of the first series means that Pearl Bay goes through serious trauma and things only get worse. Alison Whyte guest stars as a con artist who gets the better of Bob, and of the whole town. Heather bonds with her parents. Rupert's determination to get Laura back together with her ex-husband only meets with disaster. Later in the series, the town begins to speculate about Max and Laura's relationship, and the resulting confusion brings them closer.

Bucket's dog Alfonzo Dominico Jones dies mysteriously and eventually a swimming pool is named after him, in preference to the originally planned name, the Jelly Aquatic Complex.

The ABC then commissioned a third season.

Season 3

In the third season, the events of the show reach their climax. Laura decides not to take the step in her relationship with Max, propelling a despondent Max into Carmen's arms. An in-denial Laura turns to the sweet but dull Warwick (Shaun Micallef). Heather and Bob's separation is followed by his political demise. Meredith's health takes a turn for the worse. Mark Mitchell guest stars as Morton Tregonning, administrator for the recently sacked Port Deakin council, and his corruption pushes Bob to a decision; he must choose whether to help the people of Pearl Bay, or ruin them once and for all.

The final episode, "Half-Life" (Episode 39), sees the town coming together to stop Tregonning's nuclear waste dump, Miranda and Craig on trial, Laura's resignation, Karen and Angus' wedding, Meredith facing a brush with death following a stroke, Bob making a final decision about his future and spurning Tregonning, and Max and Laura's relationship resolved in a night of passion. Morton Tregonning meets a bitter end.

Although the third series was successful in ratings terms, the creators decided to end the show to avoid becoming stale.

Revival

Season 4

In October 2018, a fourth season was announced which aired on the Nine Network in 2019. The series was funded by Screen Australia and relocated from Barwon Heads to Brunswick Heads, near Byron Bay, in northern New South Wales, and also at Billinudgel and Mullumbimby. This was after a successful bid by NSW to host the series in a community that the producers had considered as a set location in the 1990s, but rejected for cost reasons. ITV's David Mott said while there had been discussions with the ABC about reviving the series for ABC Television, ABC said a revival of SeaChange did not feel right for them. It was directed by series co-creator Deb Cox and jointly produced by ITV Studios Australia and Every Cloud Productions. The series was titled “SeaChange: Paradise Reclaimed”.

Thornton and Howard were two of the original actors to appear in the revival. It focused on the relationships between Laura, Miranda, Miranda's son, and Laura's daughter by Max. The series opens with Laura returning to Pearl Bay from aid work in South Africa to visit her daughter Miranda, who she finds is 8 months pregnant, after two decades. Entering the town over a bridge that still provides limited access, she accidentally knocks down Bob Jelly, just released from prison, with her car on the main street. Jelly features in all the episodes as he again tries to 'develop' Pearl Bay with dubious real estate schemes and reconcile with an increasingly confident and entrepreneurial Heather. His daughter Jules makes an appearance as a mercenary Hong-Kong based lawyer and developer, while Kevin and Phrani reconcile and marry after spending the previous five years apart.

== Filming ==
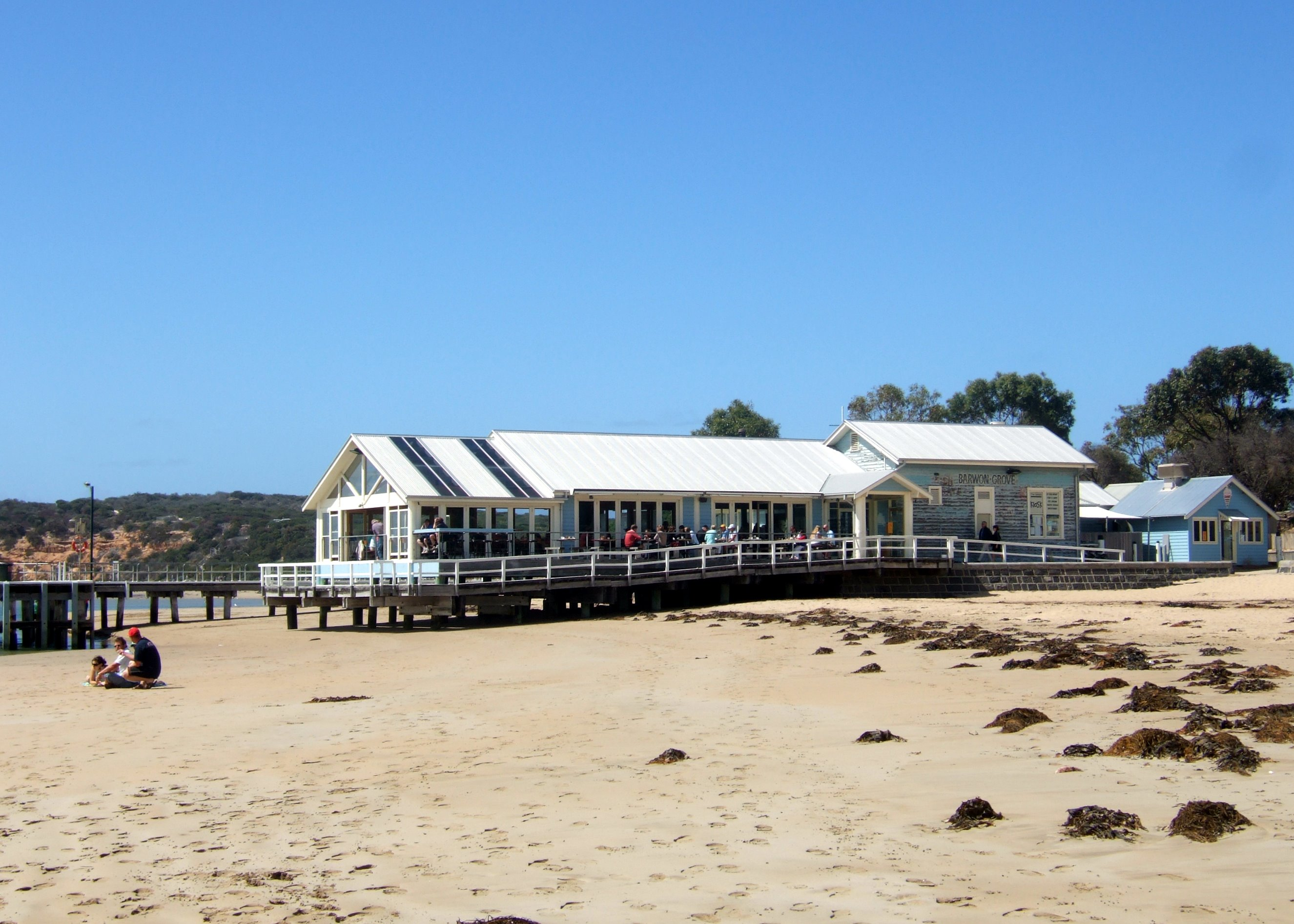
The Barwon Heads boatshed, used as Diver Dan's home, circa 2007.

Filming of series 1–3 was based at Barwon Heads, Victoria and St Leonards, Victoria, both locations being on the Bellarine Peninsula. A number of streets in the St Leonards Sea Change Estate have since been named to acknowledge some of the characters of the series. Many scenes were also filmed in Williamstown (a suburb of Melbourne), including the exterior of the Williamstown Life Saving Club, which became the court house of Pearl Bay.

Tours to see the locations where filming took place were popular in 2003.

Series 4 was filmed in Brunswick Heads, northern New South Wales, just south of the border with Queensland and 10 km from Byron Bay.

== Recurring themes ==
Shakespeare's play The Tempest is a clear influence on SeaChange, exemplified by the episode titles "Something Rich and Strange" and "Full Fathom Five", and by Miranda's name, as well as frequent freak weather events.

SeaChange was often compared to Northern Exposure.

One of the recurring jokes on the show is the town bridge. The easiest connection from Pearl Bay to the rest of the world, it had been destroyed years earlier, and attempts to fix it often go awry.

Another recurring joke involves the character 'Bucket'. This bizarre individual is an unseen character (except in one episode, in the background, when someone waves to him), but he is regularly mentioned. From various accounts he is missing limbs (but is still able to drive a boat), has no teeth and has never eaten a cereal grain in his life, and tends to get drunk often and steal people's ride-on mowers. He often arrives home drunk and would drink from the water bowl of his dog, the late Alfonzo Dominico Jones.

At the end of every episode (except episodes 1 and 12 of series 1, episode 5 of series 2 and the final episode) there is a brief scene in which Kevin and Trevor chat while overlooking the beach at the end of the day. Their conversation usually adds a comical touch to the episode. In episode 5 of series 2, the Kevin and Trevor scene is not at the very end, and takes place at the Alfonzo Dominico Antonio Jones Memorial Pool. Also, in episode 10 of series 3, Kevin's sister Suzie joined him to tell him that their recently deceased father's electric guitar (which they had buried) was worth $8,000 because he had played with The Masters Apprentices for a week. In one episode, the Masters Apprentices (or one version of them) played themselves, with credit given to Jim Keays.

== Reception ==
Viewership

Season	Episodes	Originally aired		Network	Viewers (millions)	Rating	Rank
Season	Episodes	Season premiere	Season finale	Network	Viewers (millions)	Rating	Rank
1	13	10 May 1998	2 August 1998	ABC	—N/a	12.4	#3
2	13	28 June 1999	19 September 1999	ABC	—N/a	16.3	#1
3	13	27 August 2000	25 November 2000	ABC	—N/a	13.7	#1
4	8	6 August 2019	24 September 2019	Nine Network	0.661	TBA	TBA

Awards and nominations

== Video and DVD releases and online streaming ==
The entire series was released on video, with each series released in two parts. It has also been released on DVD via ABC DVD.

DVD overview
Series	Episodes	No. of discs	Release date	
Series	Episodes	No. of discs	Region 4	Region 1
Series 1	13	4	3 October 2002	No release
Series 1 (Volume 1)	6	2	12 November 2003	No release
Series 1 (Volume 2)	7	2	12 November 2003	No release
Series 2 (Volume 1)	6	2	9 March 2004	No release
Series 2 (Volume 2)	7	2	9 March 2004	No release
Series 3 (Volume 1)	6	2	2 June 2005	No release
Series 3 (Volume 2)	7	2	2 June 2005	No release
1–3 (complete)	39	12	2 April 2008	No release
Series 1 (reissue)	13	4	4 March 2010	No release
Series 2	13	4	4 March 2010	No release
Series 3	13	4	4 March 2010	No release
1–3 (reissue)	39	12	4 March 2010	No release
Series 4 (Paradise Reclaimed)	8	2 (AUS) / 3 (U.S.)	4 December 2019	1 September 2020

SeaChange has been available on Netflix, Stan, and Acorn TV.
