= Jo Porter =

Australian TV producer and executive

Jo Porter is an Australian TV producer and television executive for Curio Pictures. She is best known for her association with the Seven Network drama department for whom she produced All Saints, Always Greener, Headland and Packed to the Rafters. In 2011, she became Director of Drama for Fremantle Media Australia.

She is the co-creator of the TV series Wonderland.

Porter was the series executive producer during Wentworth's entire run. Porter returned to Foxtel in 2024 for the drama series High Country serving as an executive producer and reunited with several members of the Wentworth crew.

In 2018, Porter was named as part of the Top 25 list for Global Women in Television.

In 2020 after an 9 year tenure at Fremantle Media Australia as the director of drama for Foxtel and as an executive producer, Porter was appointed as the Managing Director for Playmaker Studios, and in 2022 the studio was rebranded as Curio Pictures.

In 2023, Porter was announced as a mentor for the Screen Producers Guild program known as the One to Watch program.

On September 16, 2024, Porter would be announced as the executive producer of Paramount+ series Playing Gracie Darling. In January 2025, Playing Gracie Darling would go into production in Sydney. On 21 November 2024, The Artful Dodger was renewed for a second series. In September 2025, Foxtel series High Country was renewed for a second season.

== Filmography ==
=== Select production credits ===
Year	Title	Role	Notes	Ref
2025	Playing Gracie Darling	Executive producer	TV series	
2025	Narrow Road to the Deep North	Executive producer	5 episodes	
2024-present	High Country	Executive producer	8 episodes	
2023–present	Ten Pound Poms	Executive producer	6 episodes	
2023–present	The Artful Dodger	Executive producer	8 episodes	
2013-21	Wentworth	Executive producer	100 episodes	
2021	Wentworth Unlocked	Executive producer	TV special	
2021	With Intent	Executive producer	4 episodes	
2018	Picnic at Hanging Rock	Executive producer	6 episodes	
2013-15	Wonderland	Executive producer	27 episodes	
2008-12	Packed to the Rafters	Producer	66 episodes	
1998-05	All Saints (TV series)	Producer	171 episodes	
