= Deb Cox =

Australian screenwriter and producer

- Born: Deborah Cox; 29 January 1958 (age 68); Melbourne, Victoria, Australia
- Education: Firbank Girls' Grammar School
- Alma mater: University of Melbourne; RMIT University
- Occupations: Screenwriter, producer
- Writing career
- Notable works: SeaChange, Miss Fisher's Murder Mysteries

Deborah Cox (born 29 January 1958) is an Australian screenwriter and producer for television and film.

Cox started working in the television industry as a production assistant for the Crawford Productions television series Skyways. It was at Crawfords that she met her long-time writing and producing partner, Andrew Knight, and the duo would later go on to found a production company, CoxKnight Productions. Their partnership resulted in the development of the popular ABC TV series SeaChange and After the Deluge, the Network Ten dramas CrashBurn and Worst Best Friends, and the feature film Dead Letter Office. With Roger Monk, she also wrote the two seasons of the ABC drama series East of Everything which starred Richard Roxburgh as the main character.

Cox also founded Every Cloud Productions with producer Fiona Eagger which developed and produced The Gods of Wheat Street, East of Everything, Miss Fisher's Murder Mysteries, and Newton's Law.
