= Frontline season 2 =

Frontline
- Season 2
- No. of episodes: 13

Release
- Original network: ABC TV
- Original release: 24 July – 16 October 1995

Season chronology
- ← Previous; Season 1 Next → Season 3

This is a list of the 13 episodes of series two of Frontline, which first aired in 1995. In series 2, Frontline (the fictional show-within-the-show) struggles with ratings, and the network's varying attempts to heighten the ratings. The series is shot in mockumentary style.

All of the show's episodes were written and directed by Rob Sitch (Mike Moore), Jane Kennedy (Brooke Vandenberg), Santo Cilauro (Geoffrey Salter) – who also did most of the camera work – and Tom Gleisner.

== Cast ==
=== Main ===
- Rob Sitch as Mike Moore, Frontline's anchor
- Kevin J. Wilson as Sam Murphy, executive producer of Frontline
- Tiriel Mora as Martin di Stasio, reporter
- Alison Whyte as Emma Ward, the show's producer
- Jane Kennedy as Brooke Vandenberg, reporter
- Anita Cerdic as Domenica Baroni, receptionist
- Santo Cilauro as Geoffrey Salter, weatherman
- Trudy Hellier as Kate Preston, segment producer
- Pip Mushin as Stu O'Halloran, cameraman
- Torquil Neilson as Jason Cotter, sound recorder
- Linda Ross as Shelley Cohen, executive assistant to Sam

=== Recurring ===
- Genevieve Mooy as Jan Whelan, network Head of Publicity (9 episodes)
- Marcus Eyre as Hugh Tabbagh, editor (8 episodes)
- Boris Conley as Elliot Rhodes, Frontline's "Friday Night Funnyman" (6 episodes)
- Peter Stratford as Bob Cavell, Managing Director of the network (4 episodes)
- Eung Aun Khor as Khor, cleaner (3 episodes)

== Episodes ==
No. overall	No. in season	Title	Original release date
14	1	"One Big Family"	24 July 1995
With the ratings down, Brian is fired from his job as executive producer. Although Emma has the skills to take over the role, she soon realises that as a young woman she has no chance in securing it, particularly when Brian's sexist temporary replacement takes all the credit. Meanwhile, Jan (Genevieve Mooy) organises the network's new promo – "One Big Family" – but events behind the scenes reveal that relations between the network's staff are anything but harmonious.: At the end of the credits of this episode the screen says "In memory of our dear friend Bruno Lawrence (1941 - 1995)" as a tribute to Bruno Lawrence.
15	2	"Workin' Class Man"	31 July 1995
When lower-income audiences start tuning out, Jan and the show's new executive producer, Sam Murphy (Kevin J. Wilson), attempt to change Mike's image to make him a more down-to-earth guy. Elsewhere, Marty tries to stop Frontline from doing an exposé on a dodgy investment he is personally involved in.
16	3	"Heroes & Villains"	7 August 1995
When a humble professor publishes a book of statistical analyses, the media (and Frontline) attempt to make it into a debate on racism, and Sam manipulates Mike into passionate feelings on the issue, while the Frontline staff ignore their own racial prejudices. Elsewhere, Brooke attempts to make a heart surgeon look like a hero.: The main storyline is a direct parallel to a contemporary book The Bell Curve.
17	4	"Office Mole"	14 August 1995
Mike starts tiring of his job, so Sam gives him an official-sounding but easy role as "International Story Co-Ordinator". A series of big stories are ruined when A Current Affair happens to do the same ones each night, leading Sam and Mike to pursue an office mole.
18	5	"Basic Instincts"	21 August 1995
When Stu (Pip Mushin) captures a brutal beating on film, but does not intervene to help the man, Frontline becomes the centre of a debate about journalistic integrity. Meanwhile, Mike attempts to get a debate about euthanasia underway, and Brooke grows frustrated with developments in Emma's love-life.
19	6	"Let the Children Play"	28 August 1995
After getting soundly beaten in the ratings by A Current Affair when they run an Angry Anderson charity special, Frontline attempt to launch their own special hosted by Jon English. Sam assures Mike that their special will be nothing like A Current Affair's, while ensuring that the audience are manipulated at every step during the production.
20	7	"Divide the Community, Multiply the Ratings"	4 September 1995
When the team get inside information on an attack at the Serbian embassy, Frontline gets exclusive graphic film of the attack. As they avoid the police and the public, Sam and Marty attempt to incite racial violence through a series of live debates, while an oblivious Mike tries to find a way to ease the racial tension.
21	8	"Keeping Up Appearances"	11 September 1995
When a tragically scarred woman agrees to sell her story, the price is too high. But Sam comes up with a plan to raise the money. Meanwhile, Mike does an interview for a magazine, unaware that it is a gay magazine, and Sam and Jan arrange a series of publicity events to ensure Frontline's audience does not think he is gay.
22	9	"All Work and No Fame"	18 September 1995
Mike's concerns about his role with the show are amplified when Brooke is given a series of nature documentaries. To calm him down, Sam forces Marty to take Mike along on a stakeout.
23	10	"Changing the Face of Current Affairs"	25 September 1995
With the show's ratings down, the network hires Larry Hages (Harry Shearer), an American consultant, who implements a series of changes in how Frontline is produced.
24	11	"A Man of His Convictions"	2 October 1995
Mike is accused of being a lightweight, so he sets out to have a strong opinion by joining an environmental protest.
25	12	"The Great Pretenders"	9 October 1995
Marty and Sam bail out a neo-Nazi alleged murderer, but their attempts to pay him for his story run into trouble when they go up against the network's new legal adviser. Mike is asked to appear on a celebrity game show special, causing the producers to worry that he will look stupid.
26	13	"Give 'em Enough Rope"	16 October 1995
Mike is stunned when he learns that Frontline is being used for cross-promotion, promoting both the network's new soap opera and the business interests of the network's owner, Lloyd Walsh (Paul Cronin). When Walsh is suspected of breaking Australia's cross-media ownership laws, he decides to appear on Frontline to defend himself. Mike argues to Sam that the interview will be a puff piece, so Sam counters that Mike is free to do his own research and ask his own questions, confident that Mike is not up to the task. However, Mike enlists the help of an old ABC colleague to come up with some hard-hitting questions for the interview.: This is Kevin J. Wilson's and Genevieve Mooy's last episode in the series. Their characters were replaced in the third season.
