= Frontline season 3 =

Third season of Australian TV series

Frontline
- Season 3
- No. of episodes: 13

Release
- Original network: ABC TV
- Original release: 24 February – 19 May 1997

Season chronology
- ← Previous; Season 2

This is a list of the 13 episodes of series three of Frontline, which aired in 1997. In the third and final season, the show-within-the-show becomes the most respected and well-rated current affairs program in Australia; however, the politics and manipulations behind the scenes remain unchanged.

All of the show's episodes were written and directed by Rob Sitch (Mike Moore), Jane Kennedy (Brooke Vandenberg), Santo Cilauro (Geoffrey Salter) – who also did most of the camera work – and Tom Gleisner.

== Cast ==
=== Main ===
- Steve Bisley as Graham "Prowsey" Prowse, executive producer of Frontline
- Rob Sitch as Mike Moore, Frontline's anchor
- Tiriel Mora as Martin di Stasio, reporter
- Alison Whyte as Emma Ward, the show's producer
- Jane Kennedy as Brooke Vandenberg, reporter
- Anita Cerdic as Domenica Baroni, receptionist
- Santo Cilauro as Geoffrey Salter, weatherman
- Boris Conley as Elliot Rhodes, Frontline's "Friday Night Funnyman" (11 episodes)
- Trudy Hellier as Kate Preston, segment producer (10 episodes)
- Pip Mushin as Stu O'Halloran, cameraman (12 episodes)
- Torquil Neilson as Jason Cotter, sound recorder (7 episodes)
- Linda Ross as Shelley Cohen, executive assistant to Prowsey

=== Recurring ===
- Lynda Gibson as Trish, network Head of Publicity (7 episodes)
- Stephen Curry as Trev, sound recorder (6 episodes)
- Marcus Eyre as Hugh Tabbagh, editor (3 episodes)
- Peter Stratford as Bob Cavell, Managing Director of the network (2 episodes)
- Eung Aun Khor as Khor, cleaner (1 episode)

== Episodes ==
No. overall	No. in season	Title	Original release date
27	1	"Dick on the Line"	24 February 1997
Several years after season 2, Frontline has become the highest-rated current affairs show in the country, under the guidance of an experienced and smooth-operating Executive Producer (Alan Dale). The show, however, still targets the lowest common denominator, and continually airs manipulative pieces instead of hard-hitting journalism. When the executive producer retires, however, his replacement Graham "Prowsie" Prowse (Steve Bisley) proves to be a chauvinistic manipulator who does not care at all for Mike's desire to focus on important issues. As a result, Mike begins considering moving to the ABC.: Steve Bisley joins the cast. In most episodes he is given top billing.; From this episode onwards Jase (Torquil Neilson) now speaks. In the first two seasons, he never said a word.
28	2	"My Generation"	3 March 1997
Frontlines average viewer age is 64, and Mike begins to worry that the show is alienating teenagers by portraying them as vandals and drug-takers. While Emma and Mike attempt to open the show's demographics, Brooke and Prowsie continue to paint a picture of teenagers that will meet the expectations of their elderly viewers.
29	3	"The Shadow We Cast"	10 March 1997
After listening to Pauline Hanson's maiden speech, the Frontline crew join a media frenzy attacking her nativist and protectionist policies as racist until finally Hanson agrees to be interviewed. At the same time, however, Frontline runs a swathe of stories about various ethnical groups, which clearly divide racial lines and are designed to appeal to racist prejudices.: Mike's interview with Pauline Hanson parodies a 1996 interview Hanson gave on 60 Minutes with Tracey Curro.; For this episode only, Steve Bisley is second in the opening credits.; Although this season is supposedly set several years after the previous seasons (set in 1994 and 1995 respectively), this episode is very clearly set in 1996, as evidenced by Pauline Hanson's maiden speech.
30	4	"One Rule for One"	17 March 1997
Marty is suspended for a month after he fakes a story on Christopher Skase when he cannot get real footage. Mike begins receiving threatening phone calls and being trailed by suspicious cars after he runs a story about a corrupt businessman. Believing that someone is out to get him, Mike hires a personal security guard to tail him everywhere. As the controversy surrounding Marty's light punishment grows, Mike finds everyone – including his security guard – questioning journalistic ethics.: This episode is based on a real-life incident that took place in 1996 on the current affairs program, Today Tonight, where there was a similarly made-up report on Christopher Skase.
31	5	"A Hole in the Heart – Part 1"	24 March 1997
When a young boy from Papua New Guinea is flown into Australia for open heart surgery, Frontline jumps onto the case. Although all the financing and work has been organised by the charity Rotary, Prowsie conspires to keep them out of the story, and give Frontline more credit. Mike refuses to get involved, leaving Marty in charge of the story but once the week-long coverage becomes popular, Mike demands to be involved, and Prowsie faces trouble keeping other media outlets from getting involved. Meanwhile, Emma and the other women begin speculating when Brooke begins acting strangely.
32	6	"A Hole in the Heart – Part 2"	31 March 1997
As the day of Ashira's surgery nears, Marty and the team attempt to keep the story exclusive and find an entire week's storylines in what is turning out to be a relatively predictable event; and Prowsie struggles to smooth-talk his way out of not mentioning Rotary's involvement in the project. Mike's determination to be the star reporter of the story begins to wane when he is offered the chance to play golf with celebrity Ian Baker-Finch. And when Brooke informs Prowsie and Trish (Lynda Gibson) that she is pregnant, she struggles between the options of keeping her baby – which, as an unwed mother, will alienate Frontlines conservative viewership – or keeping her career.
33	7	"The Simple Life"	7 April 1997
Mike's recent investments and large salary become public knowledge, threatening his image as a 'man of the people'. To get this back, Trish and Prowsie attempt to convince him to become a philanthropist, and shoot a promo advertising Mike as a common man. Meanwhile, the rest of the office – particularly Marty – attempt to make Mike's life hell, now that they know his worth. Brooke and Emma clash over a story on youth unemployment when it becomes an attack on three unemployed teenagers whom the Frontline audience are growing to hate, and tuning in more passionately each night to do so.: Torquil Neilson's last episode.
34	8	"I Get the Big Names"	14 April 1997
Mike builds and relentlessly promotes his own profile as someone who interviews major celebrities, political figures, and other influential people from recent history. Even as he seeks an interview with Mel Gibson, Mike remains blissfully unaware that all of his interviews are actually advertisements. And when Jase is fired – for leaking audio of Brooke in the bathroom – his replacement Trev (Stephen Curry) instantly becomes a legend around the office.
35	9	"The Art of the Interview"	21 April 1997
Steve Barrett (Jeremy Sims), an old friend of the office staff, gets promoted to executive producer of Sunday Forum, and seeks out Prowsie for advice on what to do. With the help of Emma and Marty, Prowsie explains the tips and tricks of interviews – using examples from Mike's career to illustrate them – which include fuelling emotional fires instead of listening to logic, entertaining the audience, and making sure the presenter feels that he is remaining independent.: This is the only episode of all three seasons where the journalists are not covering stories. It is also shorter than all other episodes, at only 19 minutes.
36	10	"'I' Disease"	28 April 1997
When Kate (Trudy Hellier) resigns, her replacement Carla quickly starts learning the tricks of the trade from Emma: particularly that in current affairs, it is not the story that is important, but the reporter. Before long, however, her efficiency and refusal to be trampled over by the credit-hungry reporters sees her offend Mike – who is dedicating all his time to writing his autobiography (Mike Moore, by Mike Moore), and is thus embarrassed on television and radio for not checking information that Carla prepared for him; Brooke – who attempts to claim the credit for the work that all the office staff do; and Marty – who sees the others' egotism, but not his own. Before long, it becomes clear that all of the reporters suffer from what Prowsie calls "'I' Disease", and they are the only important one in the room.: Trudy Hellier's last episode.
37	11	"Addicted to Fame"	5 May 1997
Mike decides that the publicity he receives is interfering with his life and he announces that he is not going to do any more publicity. Although Prowsie is at first worried about this, Trish assures him that publicity for stars is an addiction – and so they both wait to see how long Mike can go cold turkey. Geoff is told that he can run a Sunday night special about the weather, only Mike and Brooke – who doubt that it will be popular – turn down the chance to host the show. At the last minute, Marty accepts the job. When the show turns out to be a dazzling success, Mike grows jealous of Geoff's sudden publicity, and Brooke's refusal to be involved in the project suddenly becomes a desire to help out.
38	12	"The Code"	12 May 1997
Eliott's unfunny songs displease Mike for what seems like a final time, to the point where he demands that Eliott be fired. Aware that Mike is now more important to the network than anyone else, Prowsie and Emma are forced to let him go. Although he privately hates almost everyone at the network, Mike staunchly defends "the code" whereby one never makes fun of one's colleague in the media. Meanwhile, Brooke is offended when a late-night sketch comedy show begin making fun of her, and she sets out to prove that she has a sense of humour. Although This Is Your Life have wanted Mike to appear on their show for years, Prowsie has attempted to derail the project since he is aware that when Mike's life is chronicled on television, it will prove incredibly boring. At last, however, he is forced to let the show profile Mike, and he sends Marty to attempt to find some interesting anecdotes from Mike's childhood to no avail.
39	13	"Epitaph"	19 May 1997
When an influential ABC journalist dies, Mike attends the funeral where he realises that he has not inspired anyone, and has never championed a cause without cheap concessions for sponsors and network cross-promotion. Determined to make his mark as a journalist, and to leave an epitaph that will be respected, Mike decides to tackle the problem of Aboriginal health by visiting a remote Aboriginal settlement in northern Queensland to do a week-long series of specials. His plans are complicated, however, by his own ego, his complete lack of awareness on the issues, and the fact that – back in the studio – Marty, Hugh and Prowsie are doing everything in their power to cater to the racist prejudices of the viewing audience. Stu and Trev suffer when they are forced to spend the week roughing it in the outback while Mike is flown from location to resort in his private plane. Back in the Frontline studio, Brooke gets engaged. While reluctant maid-of-honour Emma begins to suspect that Brooke does not have any real friends, Brooke herself finds it hard to navigate between the "necessary" publicity for her wedding, and her fiancé's demand for a private relationship.: This was the longest episode of the series, with a running time of 30 minutes.
