= Frontline season 1 =

Frontline
- Season 1
- DVD cover
- No. of episodes: 13

Release
- Original network: ABC TV
- Original release: 9 May – 1 August 1994

Season chronology
- Next → Season 2

This is a list of the 13 episodes of series one of Frontline, which first aired in 1994. In series 1, Frontline chronicles the behind-the-scenes workings of a struggling current affairs show competing with dominant players for audience share. The series is shot in mockumentary style.

All of the show's episodes were written, produced and directed by Rob Sitch (Mike Moore), Jane Kennedy (Brooke Vandenberg), Santo Cilauro (Geoffrey Salter)—who also did most of the camera work—and Tom Gleisner.

== Cast ==
=== Main ===
- Rob Sitch as Mike Moore, Frontline's anchor
- Bruno Lawrence as Brian "Thommo" Thompson, executive producer of Frontline
- Tiriel Mora as Martin di Stasio, reporter
- Alison Whyte as Emma Ward, the show's producer
- Jane Kennedy as Brooke Vandenberg, reporter
- Anita Cerdic as Domenica Baroni, receptionist
- Santo Cilauro as Geoffrey Salter, weatherman
- Trudy Hellier as Kate Preston, segment producer
- Pip Mushin as Stu O'Halloran, cameraman
- Torquil Neilson as Jason Cotter, sound recorder
- Linda Ross as Shelley Cohen, executive assistant to Brian

=== Recurring ===
- Marcus Eyre as Hugh Tabbagh, editor (9 episodes)
- Boris Conley as Elliot Rhodes, Frontline's "Friday Night Funnyman" (8 episodes)
- Genevieve Mooy as Jan Whelan, network Head of Publicity (8 episodes)
- Tom Gleisner as Colin Konica, photocopy repairman (6 episodes). Gleisner, one of the show's writers, has cameo appearances in five episodes before having a single line in the second last episode.
- Gerard Kennedy as Ian Farmer, Station Manager (5 episodes)
- Eung Aun Khor as Khor, cleaner (4 episodes)
- Peter Stratford as Bob Cavell, Managing Director of the network (4 episodes)
- Neil Mitchell as himself, radio presenter (3 episodes)

== Episodes ==
No. overall	No. in season	Title	Original release date
1	1	"The Soufflé Rises"	9 May 1994
Frontline presenter Mike Moore (Rob Sitch) wants to shed his image as the nice guy of current affairs, and tries to raise his status by interviewing people perceived to be soft targets, such as Dr. John Hewson, (not long after the infamous birthday cake interview). Meanwhile, reporters Brooke Vandenberg (Jane Kennedy) and Martin DiStasio (Tiriel Mora) attempt to deal with more important matters.
2	2	"The Desert Angel"	16 May 1994
When a beautiful young aid worker is found alive after a month missing in the desert, Brian (Bruno Lawrence) and the Frontline team get into a bidding war with Channel Nine for the interview. Elsewhere, Brooke's interview with Pat Cash has the team gossiping about their relationship.
3	3	"City of Fear"	23 May 1994
The Frontline team finds two stories about a murder and a kidnapping, with no likely connection, and decides to conflate the two, claiming that there is a serial killer at large. Elsewhere, Mike grows confused by his fan mail, and Brian skews the opinions of Media Watch to ease Mike's burden.
4	4	"She's Got the Look"	30 May 1994
Brian hires Nikki Burke (Rachel Kennedy), an attractive female athlete, as a reporter – which offends the women of Frontline, particularly Emma. Brooke tries to get her out of the way by suggesting she leave Frontline and concentrate on getting to the Atlanta Olympics, while confessing that she is looking to move to 60 Minutes, a more prestigious current affairs show which she calls "my Atlanta". Nikki does indeed leave, but not in the way Brooke expects: she joins 60 Minutes.
5	5	"The Siege"	6 June 1994
A gripping hostage siege becomes fodder for the media. Brooke attempts to interview the gunman's mother; Marty and his camera team attempt to break the police barriers; and Brian manipulates both the network and the audience. But Mike scores the big success when he finds himself negotiating with the gunmen on television. (This is a thinly veiled reference to a highly controversial real-life incident, the 1993 Cangai siege, in which Mike Willesee interviewed gunmen and hostages on-air.) The siege ends peacefully (as did the real life 1993 siege). The episode ends with a second siege a few weeks later, in which the gunman asks to speak to Mike on live TV, and then shoots his hostages.
6	6	"Playing the Ego Card"	13 June 1994
In an attempt to gain credibility, Mike travels to Bougainville to do a week's worth of stories on a civil war. When the lacklustre nature of his story is discovered, however, Brian and Emma must attempt to spice it up. Meanwhile, the rest of the team enjoy his absence, while the network trial Brooke as anchor.
7	7	"We Ain't Got Dames"	20 June 1994
With the show losing female viewers, Brian and Emma attempt to tailor the show to a stereotypical women's market. Mike, meanwhile, attempts to get a serious story on migrant textile workers on the air, while also trying to have 'Friday Night Funnyman' Elliot Rhodes fired, and film a new promo for the network.
8	8	"The Art of Gentle Persuasion"	27 June 1994
The team must manipulate Mike – in one of his 'serious journalism' phases – to do a so-called exposé on table top dancing. And when a crocodile victim's husband will not give a story to the press, Marty goes to extreme lengths to get one.
9	9	"The Invisible Man"	4 July 1994
Brooke uses hidden camera footage to do a story on female shoplifters, causing a media outcry and debate about journalistic ethics. And when Mike is dubbed "the invisible man of current affairs", he begins a variety of publicity stunts to raise his profile.
10	10	"Add Sex and Stir"	11 July 1994
When a woman is dropped from an (unnamed) Australian sport team, she thinks it is because she is not a lesbian. Brooke takes the story, and attempts to transform it into a hit, but in the process ignites hatred from the sporting community. Meanwhile, Emma attempts to get Marty to take his holiday time.
11	11	"Smaller Fish to Fry"	18 July 1994
After Media Watch criticises Frontline for going after small and easy targets, Mike attempts to do a big story that will take down some of the country's top bankers, but finds himself thwarted at every turn.
12	12	"Judge and Jury"	25 July 1994
Brooke does a series on a priest accused of rape, and Brian decides that Frontline needs to play up the moral outrage. Meanwhile, Marty is left with the low-quality news subjects when he and his team wipe out an entire genus of butterfly.
13	13	"This Night of Nights"	1 August 1994
When a charity loses thousands of dollars, they ask the media to keep it quiet for the sake of their reputation. Brian and Marty, however, decide to go ahead with the story. Elsewhere, Mike and Brooke prepare for the Logie Awards, but Mike finds himself the only one without a date, and people keep forgetting his name only to keep calling him "mate". The scenes at the Logie Awards feature cameos and appearances from many well-known media personalities, including Ben Elton, Bert Newton, Rosemary Margan, Amanda Keller and Anne Fulwood. This is Bruno Lawrence's last episode. He died before season 2 began filming. In the story it was explained at the start of season 2 that his character, Brian, had been fired off-screen.
