= Christopher Gabardi =

Australian actor (born 1969)

Christopher Gabardi (born 25 July 1969) is an Australian actor. He attended Wesley College, Melbourne (was School Captain in 1987) prior to graduating from Australia's National Institute of Dramatic Art (NIDA) with a degree in Performing Arts (Acting) in 1991. He is best known for his role as Dr. Vincent Hughes on Australian TV drama All Saints and the starring role in the sitcom Newlyweds. Gabardi also narrates the factual television series Medical Emergency.

He also portrayed Father Flynn in Sydney Theatre Company's production of Doubt to critical acclaim. He has been nominated for a Helpman Award and Green Room awards for roles in Melbourne Theatre Company productions.

After four years, Gabardi left All Saints and began the online ordering company 'MunchMonitor' which is classed as "an easy way for parents and students to order from school canteens, uniform shops and other school services online."

Gabardi married his wife Hali in 2003 and is the father of two children – Luca (2005) and Mila (2008).

== Filmography ==
- All Saints as Vincent Hughes
- Stingers as Dawson Lynch and Rick Fairchild
- Marshall Law as David
- The Secret Life of Us as Jack
- State Coroner as Senior Const. Daniel Ferris
- Blue Heelers as Brett Alcott
- The Thorn Birds: The Missing Years as Father Angelo
- Snowy River: The McGregor Saga as Tuck
- Newlyweds as Peter Roberts
- Hey Dad..! as Steve
- My Pet Dinosaur as EPA Agent, Fred Tansy

== Recent work ==
Gabardi stars in the feature film, My Pet Dinosaur (2017) directed by Matt Drummond.
