= Skin (play) =

1990 play by Australian playwright Rhondda Johnson

- Original language: English
- Written by: Rhondda Johnson

Premiere
- Date: 1990

Skin is a play by Australian playwright Rhondda Johnson that premiered in 1990..

It is about an older woman in a relationship with a young surfer and whose sister disapproves of the relationship.

In September 1995 it was staged at Melbourne brothel The Top of the Town and starred Saskia Post, Trudy Hellier and Torquil Neilson. Ticket sales agent Bass refused to sell tickets as they did not consider it a "recognised performance venues that the general public had access to, including people under 18." The play then moved to Sydney's Club X, an Adult Cinema Complex, and starred Rhondda Johnson, Deborah Piper and Peter Hood. It had similar ticket issues with ticket sales agent Ticketek.

The Age's Peter Weiniger says "In 'Skin' Rhondda Johnson has chronicled the dilemma and agonies of the single woman approaching middle-age, suspended between desire and despair, confusion and betrayal. Coming to terms with it all is a painful process, shedding doctrines, lovers and options like a snake sheds its skin to survive. The chosen metaphor, however, emerges more as a punchline than a theme, and for all its insights, the play takes too long to make this point.". Pamela Payne of the Sydney Morning Herald writes "Skin is theatre that wears its good intentions right up front. And that's endearing. But it's not enough. Johnson might well know what she wants to say: but her theatrical craft falls short of her conviction." Also in the Sydney Morning Herald James Waites writes "This is one of those very rare works entirely devoid of worth." He later notes "The play is no more than the ramblings of someone in possession of some very confused ideas about self-worth." In the Age Stephen Carroll says "But this play never quite comes to life. It's heavily reliant on dialogue and remains too much an enacted discussion of the issues involved. When this works it's intensely absorbing, but the dialogue in 'Skin' is a little too mundane. Still. it raises important issues, and the discussions afterwards were pretty animated." Simon Hughes of the Australian Financial Review noted "The evening becomes a tag team tirade, a contest of who can bore the other into submission" and comments on the choice of a brothel as the venue, "So why was Skin staged in a brothel? No good reason. Nice marketing, guys. Pity about the play." Kristy Machon in Lesbians on the loose finishes "Skin is like a bad, hetero, one-night stand. It promises much, but once between the sheets, it goes through the motions, fumbles in the dark, misses the point — then passes out before the climax."
