= My Pet Dinosaur =

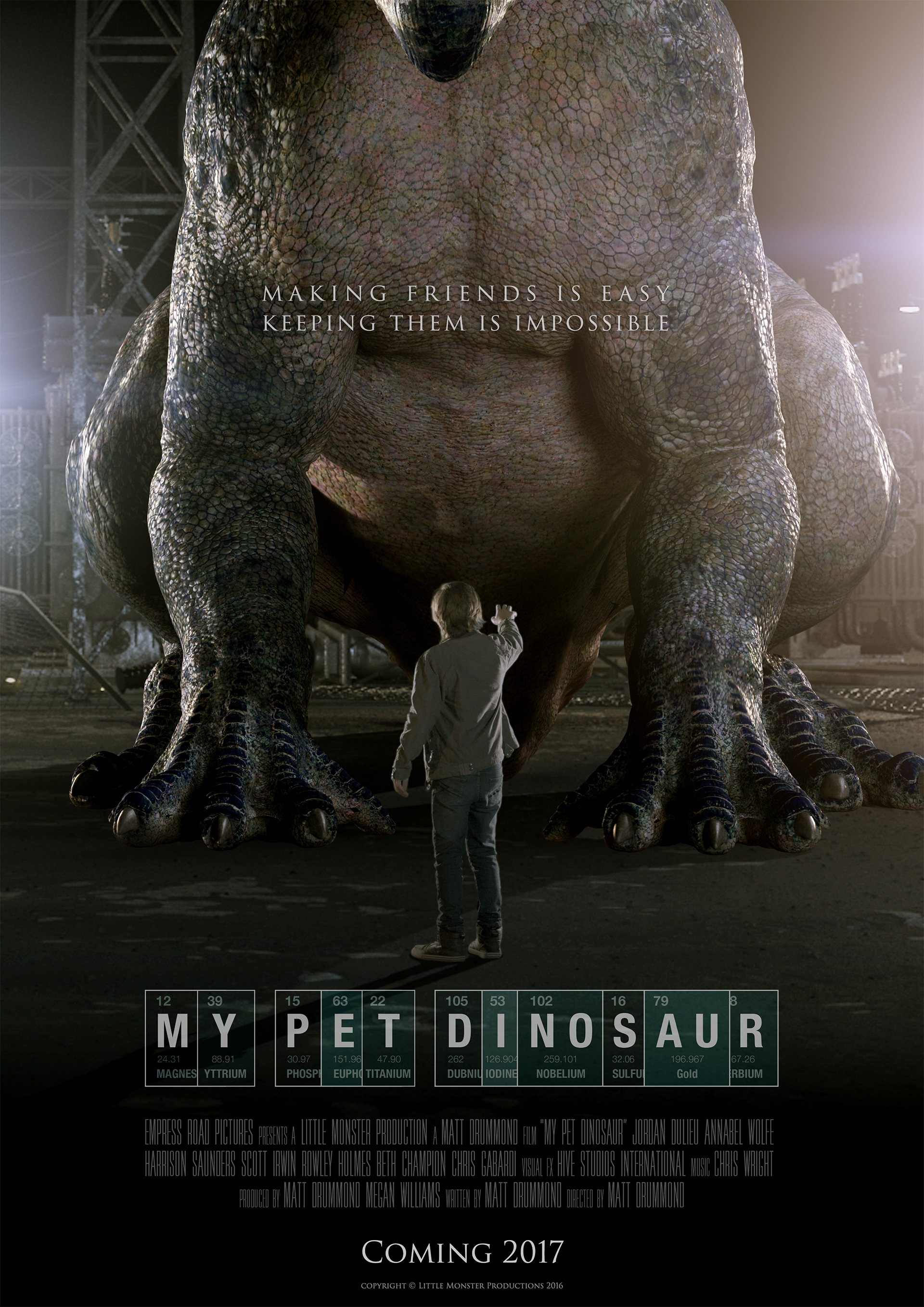
- Directed by: Matt Drummond
- Written by: Matt Drummond
- Produced by: Matt Drummond; Megan Williams
- Starring: Jordan Dulieu; Annabel Wolfe; Tom Rooney; Sam Winspear-Schillings; Harrison Saunders; Chris Gabardi; Scott Irwin; Rowland Holmes; Beth Champion
- Music by: Chris Wright
- Production company: Little Monster Productions
- Distributed by: Empress Road Pictures; Pinnacle Films
- Release date: 22 April 2017
- Country: Australia
- Box office: $1.4 million

My Pet Dinosaur is a 2017 Australian adventure family film written and directed by Matt Drummond, and produced by Megan Williams.

== Synopsis ==
A young boy befriends a dinosaur and discovers a mysterious conspiracy which could have a major impact on his small town.

== Cast ==
- Jordan Dulieu
- Annabel Wolfe
- George Moses
- Rowland Holmes
- Christopher Gabardi
- Beth Champion
- Scott Irwin
- Harrison Saunders
- Tom Rooney
- Sam Winspear-Schillings
- Darius Williams
- Joanne Samuel as Doris Mercher
- Tiriel Mora as Trevor Brown
- David Roberts as doctor (cameo)

== Development ==
Matt Drummond began writing the script to My Pet Monster in early 2015 after the success of his debut feature, Dinosaur Island. The international rights were acquired at the American Film Market by Faisal Toor from Empress Road Pictures for its newly formed Selects Division.

Rehearsals began December 2015. Principal photography commenced on 6 January 2016 in Australia, with Drummond directing. Live-action filming locations included Lithgow, Katoomba, Rydal and Portland, while CGI was done at Hive Studios International in Leura, New South Wales. Additional filming took place around the Lithgow area before transferring to Portland. Principal photography was completed on 15 February 2016.

The film is scored by Chris Wright, who also composed the score for Drummond's debut feature, Dinosaur Island. Visual effects were completed by Hive Studios International, with Drummond acting as Visual effects supervisor.

== Locations ==
- Lithgow State Mine Heritage Park
- Mt Wilson Cathedral of Ferns
- The Old Bank Brasserie
- Wentworth Falls Lake
- The Zig Zag Railway
- La Salle Academy
- Lithgow Council Chambers
- Lithgow Small Arms Factory

== Release ==
The theatrical trailer was released on January 13, 2017.

My Pet Dinosaur was distributed widely in Australian cinemas on 22 April 2017 and upon its debut at the Chinese box office took the number seven position grossing US$870,000 on its first day. After its initial release, the film continued to hold its top 10 position. My Pet Dinosaur was released in the US on digital platforms.

The film's total box office intake was approximately US$1.4 million.

== Critical response ==
Upon its Australian release, My Pet Dinosaur has received mixed reviews. Richard Gray from The Reel Bits gave the film a positive review, praising the use of local Australian resources. Alaisdair Leith from Novastream Networks gave the film five out of five stars describing the film as visually stunning.

The Movie Critic next door was impressed with the film's nostalgic qualities, stating that it was a film that "hearkens back to the beloved Spielberg classics of the 80's", whilst criticising the film's editing.

Mike McLelland from FlickeringMyth.com rewarded it a mixed review, but was impressed with the central CGI character, stating that "Magnus is a lovely central creature, cute and curious at the beginning and later imposing and magnificent. Though there were obvious budget constraints, Magnus remains interesting and believable throughout" Jarod Walker from Filmink also gave a mixed review, stating that it was a film which "will amuse the kids, but adults will find it under budget and highly derivative."

Luiz H. C. of Bloody Disgusting awarded it a negative review of 2.5 out of five, saying the film was ‘missing a Creative Spark’ and that it had a ‘formulaic approach to storytelling’.

== Soundtrack ==
My Pet Dinosaur is a soundtrack album featuring music from the film. The album features the original score composed by Chris Wright, and includes the end credit track "Only Human" written and performed by Muma Megs featuring Eirie. The album was released on iTunes in Australian on August 20, 2017, and reached Number 20 on the Soundtrack charts.

== See also ==
- List of films featuring dinosaurs
