= List of Frontline episodes =

List of Frontline episodes may refer to:

- List of Frontline (Australian TV series) episodes, an episode list for the 1994–1997 Australian television series which aired on ABC
- List of Frontline (U.S. TV program) episodes, an episode list for the U.S. television program which has aired on PBS since 1983
