= Pat Drummond =

Australian singer

Pat Drummond is an Australian singer/songwriter based in the Blue Mountains, New South Wales.

== Biography ==
Drummond's career began in pubs in Sydney in the late 1970s and early 1980s, where he performed musical mini-operas in a folk rock style that included sections written for audience participation. He had a 10-year Friday night residency at Sydney's Rest Hotel, which was demolished in the late 1980s.

Drummond's next project was the 1986 rock opera Skooldaze, on the back of which Drummond and his six-piece band toured with Cold Chisel and Marcia Hines in 1985/1986. Drummond was subsequently invited by his friend Roger Corbett to join the revived Bushwackers, before forming a duo with John Schumann after supporting Redgum on a national tour. For the release of his Tales from the Local Rag album in 1990, Drummond adopted the on-stage persona of a 1940s newspaperman, performing songs based around on- and off-stage interviews.

Drummond then toured across Australia staging fundraising concerts for community-based organisations, schools, preschools, toy libraries, church groups and service clubs. In 1993 he was the joint winner of the Male Vocal of the Year at the Australian Bush Music Festival and was a finalist for Album of the Year, Producer of the Year, Heritage Award and Country Song of the Year in the Australian Country Music Awards, known as the Golden Guitars. He later went on a series of tours, a number of which became the springboard for community festivals that he co-directed, such as the Galston Country Music Festival, which by 2005 had become Sydney's largest country music event. In October 2000 Drummond was awarded the Australian Independent Country Music Artist of the Year.

From Laughter Like A Shield in 1993, each of Drummond's albums had incorporated at least one poem, with his 1996 album Wheels and Wires including the "Colours of the Cross". In 1998 he began an association with The Naked Poets, a group of five comedic Bush Poetry performers: Marco Gliori, Shirley Friend, Murray Hartin, Ray Essery and Bobby Miller. Drummond first performed with the group at Tamworth Golf Club in 1998–1999.

Together, they released the Lie...v (Naked Poets 1) album on independent Shoestring Records, which sold tens of thousands of copies across Australia. The single, Murray Hartin's "Turbulence" went on to win the Australian Bush Laureate Award for Best Single Performance in 2000, and the following year the Naked Poets' second album, Newdirections, won both the Album of the Year category and Best Single Performance, for a poem written and performed by Marco Gliori.

In 2002, Drummond collaborated with independent female country vocalist Karen Lynne. Produced by Rod Coe, "Six Days in December" saw them pick up the 2001 award for Contemporary Country Song of the Year with a duet called "The Rush", which had already won two sections of the Queensland Songwriting competition.

In 2001, Drummond toured "The Chess Set", creating two new characters to examine the political divisions emerging throughout Australia. The left-wing Black Knight and the right-wing White Knight argued over issues such as Australia's involvement in the Iraq War, refugee detention centres, and reconciliation.

In 2004–2005, Drummond released a double interactive CD featuring 26 new songs and political speeches. It also included his live theatre show from the project featured at the Blue Mountains Folk Festival and the National Folk Festival in 2006. In 2008, his new close harmony three-piece comedy outfit, the BBQ Kings, was signed to ABC/Universal, and their first album The Fellowship of the Grill was released nationally and received a Final Five Nomination in the 2009 ARIA Awards for Comedy Album of the Year. With fellow songwriters, Tony Williams and Chris O'Leary the show was set around three old mates who meet at a BBQ after not having seen each other for nearly a decade, and uses comedy to explore the middle aged male condition.

In January 2016, at the Tamworth Country Music Festival, Drummond received the TSA Songmaker Award for Lifetime Achievement in Songwriting. His live double CD, Late Final Extra - Tales From The Travelling Years, was released in December 2016.

Drummond has served five years with the Country Music Association of Australia (CMAA), 12 years as entertainment director at the Galston Country Music Festival in Sydney, and more recently with the Blue Mountains Folk, Blues and Music Festival, the Hartley Big Backyard Bash, The 2LT Oberon Music Festival and The Steam and Vintage Fair.

== Personal life and family ==
Drummond appeared in a cameo role as the "schoolteacher" in his son, Matt Drummond's debut feature film Dinosaur Island (2014).

== Discography ==
=== Albums ===
List of albums
| Title | Album details |
|---|---|
| What You See Is What You Get | Released: December 1980; Label: Shoestring Records (SR 1); Formats: LP |
| Pat Drummond | Released: 1981; Label: Shoestring Records; Formats: LP |
| Skool Daze | Released: 1985; Label: Shoestring Records (SC12-02); Formats: LP |
| Age of Rage – Live at the Rest Hotel 1977–87 | Released: 1987; Label: Shoestring Records (SR5); Formats: LP, Cassette; Recorded live |
| Tales from the Local Rag | Released: September 1990; Label: True Blue Records (467443 1); Formats: LP, Cassette; Recorded live |
| Laughter Like a Shield | Released: 1994; Label: Larrikin Records (CDLRF294); Formats: CD |
| Of Wheels and Wires | Released: 1996; Label: Larrikin Records (CDLRF467); Formats: CD |
| Through the Cracks- Live at the Clarendon | Released: March 1998; Label: Larrikin Record; Formats: CD |
| Six Days in December | Released: April 2000; Label: Shoestring Records; Formats: CD |
| The Chess Set Volume 1 and 2 | Released:2003; Label: Shoestring Records; Formats: CD |
| The Long Journey Home | Released: 2008; Label: Shoestring Records; Formats: CD |
| The Shark In The Bath and Other Tails | Released: 2009; Label: Shoestring Records; Formats: CD |
| Late Final Extra - Tales From The Travelling Years | Released: 2016; Label: Shoestring Records; Formats: CD |

=== With The BBQ Kings ===
- The Fellowship of the Grill (2008, ABC/Universal)

=== Other singles ===
List of singles as featured artist, with selected chart positions
| Title | Year | Peak chart positions |
| Title | Year | AUS |
|---|---|---|
| "The Garden" (as Australia Too) | 1985 | 22 |

== Awards ==
=== ARIA Music Awards ===
The ARIA Music Awards are a set of annual ceremonies presented by Australian Recording Industry Association (ARIA), which recognise excellence, innovation, and achievement across all genres of the music of Australia. They commenced in 1987.

| Year | Nominee / work | Award | Result | Ref. |
|---|---|---|---|---|
| 2009 | "The Fellowship of the Grill" (as The BBQ Kings) | Best Comedy Release | Nominated | |

=== Tamworth Songwriters Awards ===
The Tamworth Songwriters Association (TSA) is an annual songwriting contest for original country songs, awarded in January at the Tamworth Country Music Festival. They commenced in 1986. Drummond won two awards.

| Year | Nominee / work | Award | Result (wins only) |
|---|---|---|---|
| 2001 | "The Rush" by Pat Drummond and Karen Lynne | Contemporary Song of the Year Award | Won |
| 2016 | Pat Drummond | Songmaker Award | awarded |
