= Cathy Godbold =

Australian actress (1974–2018)

- Born: Catherine Malia Godbold; 23 September 1974; Australia
- Died: 4 May 2018 (aged 43); Melbourne, Victoria, Australia
- Resting place: Springvale Botanical Cemetery
- Occupation: Actress
- Years active: 1990–2007
- Parent(s): Rosemary Margan (mother); Norman Godbold (father); Ross Mitchell (step-father)

Catherine Malia Godbold (23 September 1974 – 4 May 2018) was an Australian actress.

== Career ==
Godbold was best known for her role as Deborah Hale Regnery on The Saddle Club and the ill-fated Meg Bowman in Home and Away. She also starred in Chances and Newlyweds in which she starred as Jules Carter. Following the cancellation of Newlyweds, Godbold began doing voice over work in between auditions. In 1997, she was cast as Sondra Pike in Neighbours.

== Personal life ==
Godbold was the daughter of Australian broadcaster Rosemary Margan, who she portrayed in the Graham Kennedy biopic The King.

== Death ==
In May 2007, after The Saddle Club was picked up for a third season, Godbold was diagnosed with brain cancer, age 32. She had the tumour removed and began chemotherapy.

A second brain tumour developed in January 2018, which proved to be terminal. Godbold died on 4 May 2018, aged 43, just six months after the death of her mother. Godbold's funeral was held on 10 May 2018. Godbold and her mother are buried together at Springvale Botanical Cemetery.

== Filmography ==
=== Film ===
Year	Title	Role	Type
1992	Alex: The Spirit of a Champion	Maggie Benton	Feature film
2007	The King: The Story of Graham Kennedy	Rosemary Margan	TV movie

=== Television ===
Year	Title	Role	Type
1990	More Winners	Sarah O'Grady	TV series, season 2, episode 1: "His Master's Ghost"
1991	Chances	Nikki Taylor	TV series, 71 episodes
1992	Home and Away	Meg Bowman	TV series, 40 episodes
1993–94	Newlyweds	Jules Carter	TV series, 52 episodes
1994	Hey Dad..!	Cassie	TV series, season 14, episode 5: "Romancing the Stunned"
1994	Frontline	Herself	TV series, season 1, episode 13: "This Night of Nights"
1997	Neighbours	Sondra Pike	TV series, 4 episodes
1994; 2000	Blue Heelers	Natalie Anderson / Gail Hutton	TV series, 2 episodes
2001	Blonde	Assistant #2	TV miniseries
2001–03	The Saddle Club	Deborah Hale Regnery	TV series, seasons 1 & 2, 32 episodes
2002	The Saddle Club: Adventures at Pine Hollow	Deborah Hale Regnery	Video special
2007	Get This	Herself	TV series, season 1, episode 69

== Theatre ==
Year	Title	Role	Venue / Co.
1998	Noises Off		Twelfth Night Theatre Brisbane, Newcastle Civic Theatre, Gold Coast Arts Centre, Gladstone Entertainment Centre, Townsville Civic Theatre, Empire Theatre, Toowoomba, Theatre Royal, Hobart, Walkington Theatre, Karratha, Carnarvon Civic Centre, Queens Park Theatre, Geraldton, Mandurah Performing Arts Centre, Bunbury Regional Entertainment Centre
1994–95	Falling from Grace	Tessa Brompton-Story	Malthouse Theatre, West Gippsland Arts Centre, Monash University, Theatre Royal, Hobart, Capital Theatre, Bendigo, Brisbane with Queensland Theatre, Canberra Theatre, Wharf Theatre with STC with Playbox Theatre Company
