= Skin Deep (1978 film) =

- Directed by: Geoff Steven
- Written by: Piers Davies; Roger Horrocks; Geoff Steven
- Produced by: John Maynard
- Starring: Deryn Cooper; Ken Blackburn
- Cinematography: Leon Narbey
- Edited by: Simon Sedgley
- Music by: Jan Preston and Neil Hannan
- Production company: Phase Three Films
- Release date: November 1978
- Running time: 101 min
- Country: New Zealand
- Language: English
- Budget: $180,000

Skin Deep is a 1978 New Zealand film. It was directed by Geoff Steven and filmed in the small town of Raetihi, with a budget of around $180,000. It debuted at the Chicago International Film Festival in November 1978. It was later screened in New York and Denver and toured Europe. It had its New Zealand release in February 1979, first showing for free for residents of Raetihi.

== Synopsis ==
The town of Carlton is trying to raise funds to promote itself. A local gym brings a city masseuse to town.

== Cast ==
- Deryn Cooper as Sandra Ray
- Ken Blackburn as Bob Warner
- Grant Tilly as Philip Barrett
- Alan Jervis as Vic Shaw
- Glenis Levestam as Alice Barrett
- Heather Lindsay as Rita Warner
- Bill Johnston as Michael Campbell
- Arthur Wright as Les Simpson
- Kevin J. Wilson as Graham Goodwin

== Reception ==
Variety said "An excellent script and three-dimensional characters flesh out this skeleton. Central to the theme and payoff is Sandra Ray (Deryn Cooper), the masseuse who, though she still emits plenty of erotic voltage, has had enough of the sex side of the business." In the New York Times Vincent Canby said Skin Deep was "a nice, socially aware comedy of the sort that Hollywood might have made 30 or 40 years ago, when movies didn't have to be blockbusters and when movie makers were allowed to express some interest in the quality of the life around them." William Dart in Art New Zealand writes "The narrative flow of the work is impressive; and it is here that Geoff Steven has made a considerable achievement." He later says "Skin Deep was so accomplished from a technical standpoint that possibly only parts of the musical score could be directly criticised." Colin Bennett in the Age finishes "Basically sober in intent, Steven refuses to make fun of the place or its inhabitants, even when their failings surface. The trouble is that, if satire is too faint, it goes unappreciated. And if you don't make fun in a comedy, it isn't very funny."

Dave Sargent in the Sydney Morning Herald writes "Few Filmakers manage to employ a naturalistic style as competently as Geoff Steven. He is assisted by a screenplay which moves effortlessly, photography that is marked by realistic clarity, and performances that are devoid of obvious "acting" styles." The Oregonian's Ted Mahar notes "Director Steven, who wrote the script with two others, unfolds his tale at a steady pace that is never too slow. His characters are full of satirical touches but are never caricaturistic".
