= Wellmania =

Australian comedy-drama series

- Genre: Comedy drama
- Created by: Brigid Delaney; Benjamin Law
- Based on: Wellmania: Misadventures in the Search for Wellness by Brigid Delaney
- Written by: Benjamin Law; Belinda King; Romina Accurso; Rachel Laverty; Amy Stewart; Nick Coyle
- Directed by: Erin White; Helena Brooks
- Starring: Celeste Barber; JJ Fong; Genevieve Mooy; Lachlan Buchanan; Remy Hii; Alexander Hodge; Simone Kessell; Virginie Laverdure; Johnny Carr
- Country of origin: Australia
- Original language: English
- No. of episodes: 8

Production
- Executive producers: Benjamin Law; Belinda King; Celeste Barber; Bree-Anne Sykes; Chris Oliver-Taylor; Warren Clarke
- Production location: Sydney, Australia
- Cinematography: Dan Freene
- Running time: 26–35 minutes
- Production companies: Fremantle Australia; Nondescript Productions

Original release
- Network: Netflix
- Release: 29 March 2023

Wellmania is an Australian comedy-drama television series co-created by Brigid Delaney and Benjamin Law for Netflix. Based on Delaney's memoir-reportage hybrid, Wellmania: Misadventures in the Search for Wellness, it follows Liv Healy (Celeste Barber), a 39-year-old woman who struggles with a "major health crisis" as she tries various methods to reclaim her well-being. The series launched globally on the streaming platform on 29 March 2023.

== Premise ==
Liv Healy, a New York-based food writer with an unhealthy lifestyle, gets an opportunity that forces her to reevaluate her choices in her hometown of Sydney, Australia. Struggling with her habits, she tries various methods of healthy living to advance her career, with varying levels of success.

== Cast ==
=== Main ===
- Celeste Barber as Olivia "Liv" Healy, New York Times food writer
  - Olive McKinnon plays a younger Liv Healy
- JJ Fong as Amy Kwan, an investigative journalist from The Standard Sydney who is Liv's best friend of 24 years
  - Heleina Zara plays a younger Amy Kwan
- Genevieve Mooy as Lorraine Healy, Liv's mother who works as a nurse
- Lachlan Buchanan as Gareth "Gaz" Healy, Liv's brother and fitness trainer
- Remy Hii as Dalbert Tan, Gaz's fiancé
- Alexander Hodge as Isaac Huang, ex-football player who is Liv's love interest
- Simone Kessell as Helen King, editor-in-chief of The Standard Sydney
- Virginie Laverdure as Valerie Jones, Liv's editor from The New York Times
- Johnny Carr as Doug Henderson, Amy's husband, a construction worker

=== Recurring ===
- Leah Vandenberg as Dr. Priyanka Singh, consulate-approved physician
- Anthony Phelan as Dr. Price, Lorraine's employer and physician
- Guy Edmonds as Chad, United States consulate official
- Billy Bate as Archie Henderson-Kwan, Amy and Doug's son
- Kiera McAlister as Evie Henderson-Kwan, Amy and Doug's teenage daughter
- Claire Lovering as Bianga, Dalbert's close friend
- Nicole Shostak as Megan, Dalbert's close friend
- Matthew Backer as Armand, Dalbert's close friend and a hairstylist

=== Guests ===
- Miranda Otto as Camille Lavigne, sex therapist and motivational speaker
- Aden Young as Gabriel Wolf, renowned chef from New York
- Yael Stone as Philomena, a death doula
- Keegan Joyce as Sebastian, Gaz's ex-boyfriend
- Rowan Witt as Jesse
- Silvia Colloca as Gianna

== Episodes ==
No.	Title	Directed by	Written by	Original release date
1	"Carpe That Diem"	Erin White	Belinda King	29 March 2023
A renowned New York Times food writer with an unhealthy lifestyle, Olivia "Liv" Healy, has just received an offer to serve as judge on an upcoming cooking competition television show. But, she heads out to Sydney, Australia to visit her longtime best friend, Amy Kwan, on Amy's 40th birthday. During her time in Sydney, Liv's handbag, containing her US green card, is stolen. While attending the AJA awards ceremony, where Amy is a nominee, Liv unwittingly insults Amy's editor-in chief, Helen King, which drives a wedge between Amy and Liv. While applying for a new green card, Liv faints and wakes up in a clinic. Dr. Priyanka Singh, a consulate physician, tells her that she fainted due to her high cholesterol, high blood pressure, and other unhealthy markers, and rules her as unqualified for the green card for health reasons — unless she improves her health markers within a year. Liv, however, does not have a year to spare, as her show in New York is pending. She storms out of the clinic, declaring that she will improve her health in less than four weeks.
2	"The Cleanse"	Erin White	Benjamin Law	29 March 2023
After apologizing to Helen and clearing the air with Amy, Liv invites Amy to her next attempt to improve her health, Body cleansing therapy dubbed as "Bondi cleanse." During Liv's therapy, Liv again upsets Amy after she snatches her phone and meddles with her affairs. Later that night, Liv brings a present to Amy's son, Archie, and invites herself to Archie's twelfth birthday party. At the gym, Liv meets (and injures) Isaac Huang, a former footballer, while attempting to exercise. She asks her brother, Gareth "Gaz" Healy, to help her train, but Gaz, still bitter from Liv's decision not to attend his wedding, declines. Later, during Archie's birthday party, Liv makes amends with Amy. The next day, after having her therapy result dismissed by Dr. Singh, Liv meets Gaz in front of the gym, this time attempting to make amends with him by promising she will attend his wedding.
3	"Get Your Duck On"	Erin White	Belinda King	29 March 2023
Liv starts to train with Gaz and agrees to let Gaz track her progress. Liv soon notices a renowned chef, Gabriel Wolf, known as NYC's "King of Meat," eating vegan food, and she sets out to write an article based on Gabriel's supposedly new habits. Over several nights, Liv dines out at several of Gabriel's restaurants with Amy, her mother, Lorraine Healy, and Isaac, respectively, to find proof of Gabriel's new diet. Lorraine celebrates her retirement with Liv and Gaz. Liv talks her way into a party thrown by Gabriel but fails to gather sufficient information for her article. While taking a spin class with Isaac, Liv vomits on the floor due to being hungover from Gabriel's party.
4	"The Real Camille"	Erin White	Romina Accurso and Rachel Laverty	29 March 2023
Amy recommends Liv to write an article about a French sex psychologist and motivational speaker, Camille Lavinge, suggesting Liv take a temporary position as a lifestyle writer of The Standard Sydney to find out Camille's secret. Liv continuously attempts to interview Camille to no avail. After Liv taunts Camille about her authenticity, Camille conducts a wellness program session with Liv and eventually opens up to her, revealing a secret about her identity. Liv later divulges the information to Amy, who insists Liv leak Camille's secret as they had originally planned. Liv sends the article to Helen, divulging Amy's personal issues rather than Camille's true identity, which causes friction with Amy. Meanwhile, Gaz starts to have doubts about his engagement with his fiancé, Dalbert Tan and reconnects with his former lover, Sebastian.
5	"Hall of Mirrors"	Helena Brooks	Benjamin Law and Nick Coyle	29 March 2023
Liv's article on Camille was a success, and her editor, Valerie Jones, tells Liv she needs to come back to NYC immediately to start her TV job. Liv experiments with Microdosing LSD in the hope that it'll help her with problem solving. While she's under the influence, Liv gets a tearful phone call from Amy's teenaged daughter, Evie, and Liv enlists Isaac to help her pick Evie up from Luna Park. Amy and her husband, Doug Henderson, attempt to fix their broken relationship. After accosting U.S. consulate staff yet again, Liv is told by Dr. Singh that she'll approve the green card if Liv can pass a mental health exam.
6	"Life and Death"	Helena Brooks	Romina Accurso	29 March 2023
As Liv heads to Canberra for her psychiatric exam, she makes a surprising connection with Philomena, a death doula, which causes her to flash back to her teenage years: the day her father died, which was also the first day of her friendship with Amy. As she's about to begin the evaluation, Gaz calls her, furious that she's missed his rehearsal dinner.
7	"The Big A"	Helena Brooks	Belinda King and Amy Stewart	29 March 2023
Liv's green card application is finally approved, but before she heads back to New York, she arranges a spa day for the family to prepare for Gaz's wedding. Lorraine and Gaz are furious when they discover Liv is planning to board a flight right after the wedding. Just before the wedding, Gaz confesses to Dalbert that he was unfaithful to him, but the wedding proceeds as planned. At the reception, Liv passes out as she's preparing to deliver a speech.
8	"Count to 10"	Helena Brooks	Benjamin Law and Brigid Delaney	29 March 2023
After a trip to the hospital, Liv scrambles to get to New York City in time for her launch over her family's protestations. Gaz and Dalbert's wedding reception is a smashing success due to Liv's sense of fun. Liv arrives back in New York in time for the launch, but she is thrown off by a panic attack when she can't find her late father's watch. A frantic phone call to Dr. Singh reminds Liv of the tremendous progress she made in a matter of weeks. Back in Sydney, Lorraine is struck by a car and Gaz attempts to contact Liv from the hospital. Liv ignores Gaz's phone calls as she walks onto the set of her TV show and proclaims, "I'm well."

== Production ==
=== Development ===
Netflix had ordered Wellmania, inspired by Brigid Delaney's novel, Wellmania: Misadventures in the Search for Wellness, on 11 December 2021 for an eight-part half-hour series. Delaney and Benjamin Law were announced as co-creators, with Law serving as executive producer. Celeste Barber, Belinda King, Bree-Anne Sykes, in addition to Chris Oliver-Taylor and Warren Clarke from Fremantle, would also join Law as an executive producer. Additionally, Romina Accurso, Nick Coyle, and Amy Stewart were announced as series' writers. On 23 March 2022, Erin White and Helena Brooks were unveiled as the series directors. On 31 October 2023, Barber confirmed that the series had been canceled after one season.

=== Casting ===
Upon series announcement on 11 December 2021, Celeste Barber was also announced to play the series' lead. On 21 March 2022, it was revealed that JJ Fong, Genevieve Mooy, Lachlan Buchanan, Remy Hii, Alexander Hodge, Simone Kessell, Johnny Carr, and Virginie Laverdure would join Barber as the main cast of the series. Additionally, Miranda Otto, Leah Vandenberg, and Aden Young would also appear on undisclosed capacities.

=== Filming ===
Principal photography of the series was announced on 11 December 2021, with Sydney unveiled as one of the shooting locations. On 21 March 2022, Dan Freene was revealed as the cinematographer.

== Release ==
Wellmania premiered on Netflix on 29 March 2023.

=== Marketing ===
The first trailer of the series was published on YouTube on 15 February 2023.

== Awards and nominations ==
- Logie Award for Most Popular Actress – Celeste Barber (nomination)

== See also ==
- List of Australian television series
