= Rosemary Margan =

Australian television and radio personality

- Born: 12 May 1937
- Died: 5 December 2017 (aged 80)
- Occupations: Television personality; radio presenter; weather presenter; commercial presenter
- Years active: 1950-1994
- Known for: Weather Presenter (Network Nine)
- Family: Cathy Godbold (daughter) Neil Mitchell (brother-in-law)

Rosemary Margan (12 May 1937 – 5 December 2017) was an Australian television and radio personality. She won Logie Awards for best Victorian Female Personality in 1969 and 1970.

== Biography ==
Margan became well known for working with both Graham Kennedy and Bert Newton, she was the sister-in-law of radio presenter Neil Mitchell and regularly presented commercials on his morning program.

A soft and clear speaking voice with precise, unaccented diction were her trademarks in both radio and television presentations. She also delivered voiceovers in cinema slide advertisements for the Val Morgan Agency.

While delivering a live commercial in March 1975, she was being teased by Kennedy as usual with his bird calls, when he uttered the infamous "crow-call" taken for an expletive.

Among her many TV appearances over a long and successful career, she had a brief but memorable cameo in the comedy/satire current affairs show Frontline (Series 1, Episode 13, "This Night of Night") where she played herself as a celebrity guest at the Logie Awards, who did not know star presenter Mike Moore's name and merely called him "mate".

She was the mother of actress Cathy Godbold.
