= Funky Squad =

Australian comedy television series

- Genre: police comedy
- Written by: Santo Cilauro; Tom Gleisner; Jane Kennedy
- Directed by: Santo Cilauro; Tom Gleisner; Jane Kennedy
- Starring: Tim Ferguson; Jane Kennedy; Santo Cilauro; Tom Gleisner
- Composer: Craig Harnath
- Country of origin: Australia
- Original language: English
- No. of seasons: 1
- No. of episodes: 7

Production
- Production location: Melbourne
- Running time: 30 mins
- Production company: Working Dog Productions

Original release
- Network: ABC TV
- Release: 24 April – 5 June 1995

Funky Squad is a short-lived 1995 Australian comedy television series which satirised 1970s-era U.S. police television dramas, such as The Mod Squad. Only seven half-hour episodes were produced, which were broadcast on the ABC. Real television commercials from the 1970s were shown during the program's "commercial breaks".

The show featured four "funky" undercover detectives: undetectable as police, given their "hipness". The conclusion of each episode was deliberately designed to be incredibly predictable: usually the perpetrator of the crime under investigation could be identified within the first few minutes of the episode.

Before the television series, Funky Squad originally aired as a series of episodes on radio station Triple M. Rob Sitch, who played Grant, was replaced by Tim Ferguson when the series went to television.

== Characters ==
In a metafictional setting, the characters were played by "actors" whose "names" were displayed in the opening credits of the program. These "real names" were also satirical, poking fun at the names of actors who appeared in American 1970s cop shows.

=== "Stix": Joey Alvarez ===
- Played by Santo Cilauro
- Had a large afro.

=== "Grant": Blair Steele ===
- Played by Tim Ferguson
- The leader of the group; the cool guy.

=== "Poncho": Harvey Zdalka Jr ===
- Played by Tom Gleisner
- Mute, as a bullet had hit his tongue. The joke was that this was a ridiculous plot device to get around having accidentally hired an actor with poor English.

=== "Cassie": Verity Svensön-Hart ===
- Played by Jane Kennedy
- The token female; a stereotypical 1970s feminist.

=== The Chief: Baldwin Scott ===
- Played by Barry Friedlander
- The tough cop to whom the Funky Squad reported.

== Production ==
The program was created and written by Australian comedians Santo Cilauro, Jane Kennedy, Tom Gleisner, and Rob Sitch of Frontline and The Late Show fame. Cilauro, Kennedy and Gleisner also co-directed the series. Sitch was originally to star but was replaced by Ferguson due to study commitments overseas.

The show was given a meagre production budget of A$1,000 per episode, so many of the costumes were acquired by wardrobe director Kitty Stuckey (best known for her work on Kath & Kim) at local Melburnian Salvation Army stores.

== Merchandise including video and DVD release ==
In 1995 The Funky Squad Annual was published. Unlike many TV show tie-ins this was not a behind-the-scenes work or analysis of the show but was a parody of annuals for TV shows in the 1970s. As such it addressed a child readership and included many pictures, features, puzzles and comic strips.

A VHS video containing three episodes of the series ("A Degree in Death", "Wrong Side of the Tracks" and "The Carnival is Over") was released in 1996. A DVD set of all seven episodes of the series was released in Australia on 7 November 2007. The DVDs were marked as Region 4, but appear to be region-free.
