= Neil Mitchell (radio presenter) =

Australian radio presenter

Neil Mitchell AO
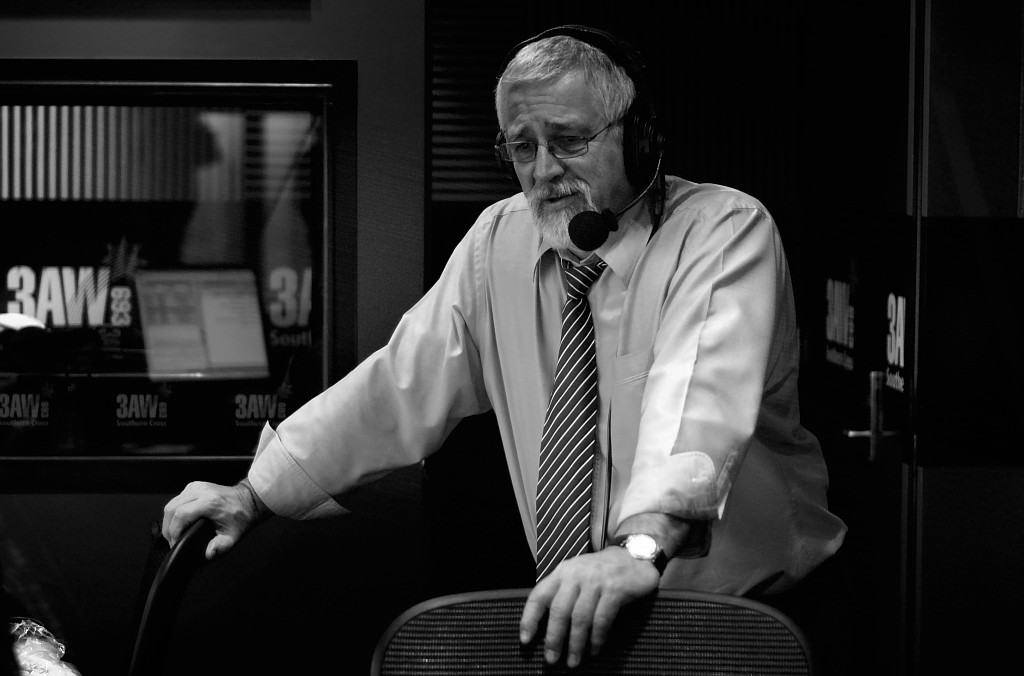
- Mitchell in May 2007
- Born: 21 November 1951 (age 74); Melbourne, Victoria, Australia
- Occupations: Journalist; reporter; talkback radio presenter; television personality
- Years active: 1969−2023
- Employer: 3AW

Neil Mitchell AO (born 21 November 1951) is an Australian former newspaper and magazine journalist, radio presenter and television personality, best known for his long-stint on Melbourne AM talk-back station 3AW.

== Early career ==
The son of a school teacher, Mitchell entered journalism aged 17, straight after completing high school. He has had involvement in newspapers, radio and television.

== Newspaper and magazine journalist ==
He was one of the youngest ever editors of a major Australian metropolitan newspaper, The Herald, holding that position from 1985 to 1987.

Mitchell was also a reporter, columnist and news executive at The Age for 16 years, including four years as sports editor. He has also worked for Time Magazine

== Television ==
He presented documentaries and his own talk back TV program on both the Nine Network and 10 Network which were both short-lived. He also worked on two programs on the Seven Network and on Sky News Australia.

== Radio ==
Mitchell began working at Melbourne station 3AW in March 1987. Initially he worked part-time on weekends and as a morning fill-in host for former broadcaster Derryn Hinch and later became the host of the drive time program in October 1987. In 1990, he moved to the morning program where he has been a successful and influential figure ever since. In 1994 he appeared as himself in the first season of Australian comedy television series Frontline.

Mitchell has a reputation for looking out for "the little guys" and spends plenty of on-air time trying to rectify problems brought to his attention by his listeners, who are encouraged to contact the program with examples of bureaucratic bungling and red-tape. A well-known example is his successful effort to have speed-camera fines from faulty cameras in Melbourne reversed, which resulted in the refunding of AU$26 million to motorists.

Although Mitchell was on-air 08:30 to noon weekdays, his time commitment was much longer, as he started work at 5 am and rarely finished before 3 pm.

In December 2009, Mitchell was the subject of a concerted effort by rival newcomer talk station, MTR, to gain his services. After protracted negotiations between 3AW and soon to be out of contract Mitchell, he eventually stayed at 3AW, citing loyalty to his listeners as his ultimate reason for continuing at the station. He rejected a more lucrative offer from MTR.

In August 2011, Mitchell signed a new three-year, multi-million-dollar contract with 3AW, which started in January 2012.

In September 2023, Mitchell announced he would step down from his role at 3AW at the end of the year.

== Charity and community work ==
Mitchell is involved in community and charity work both professionally and in his private life. Some of his successful on-air campaigns have included raising awareness for the building of a new facility for adolescents at Melbourne's Royal Children's Hospital and helping to set up Blue Ribbon Day for Victoria Police after the death of officers in 1988.

Acknowledgement of Mitchell's hard work in this area is in the citation for his Order of Australia honour which includes the words, for services ".. to the community through a range of charitable institutions".

== Honours and awards ==
In the June 2007 Queen's Birthday Honours List Neil Mitchell was made an Officer of the Order of Australia (AO) "For service to the print, radio and television media, and to the community through a range of charitable institutions".

Over his years in the media Mitchell has won eight Melbourne Press Club Quill Awards for best radio current affairs report and one best columnist award.

In 2011, Mitchell won the Melbourne Press Club Graham Perkin Australian Journalist of the Year Award, for excellence in radio journalism over a quarter of a century. He is the first radio journalist to win the coveted award. Mitchell is especially proud of this award as, in his words, "I’ve never thought too much about personal awards, but this is a very special one because I worked with him, and because it's about real journalism. You can get the Walkley just by being at the right place at the right time and doing a good job, whereas the Perkin is a recognition of a year of consistency."

In November 2013, Mitchell won his first Walkley Award, in the radio/audio news and current affairs category, for his report that the Ford Motor Company would stop manufacturing vehicles in Australia after 2016.

In March 2014, Mitchell was named as the winner of the 2013 Best Radio Current Affairs Report at the Melbourne Press Club's annual Quill awards. This award was for Mitchell's scoop on the Ford Motor Company's decision to end local manufacturing in Australia.

=== Australian Commercial Radio Awards ===
Mitchell has won many Australian Commercial Radio Awards (ACRAs) including:-

- 2007 Inducted into the Australian Commercial Radio Hall of Fame
- 2008 Best talk presenter
- 2011 Best talk presenter
- 2012 Best current affairs presenter
- 2013 Best current affairs presenter

== Personal life ==
Mitchell has been married since the 1980s and has a son and a daughter. He rarely mentions his family life publicly. He is a keen supporter of the Melbourne Football Club.
