= After the Beep =

1996 Australian television series

After the Beep is an Australian television comedy series which aired on the ABC in 1996. It was produced by John O'Grady, directed by Geoffrey Portmann and written by Julie Harris.

== Cast ==
- Genevieve Lemon as Josephine Donnelly
- Genevieve Mooy as Mae Santos
- June Salter as Kath Dillon
- Kerry Walker as Mary Donnelly
- Emily Weare as Grace Fleming
- Giordano Gangl as Colin Green
- Richard Healy as Steve Baker
- Jacqueline Brennan as Trish
- Bruce Spence
- Stan Kouros
- Greg Bepper
