= Newlyweds (TV series) =

1993 Australian sitcom

- Genre: Sitcom
- Created by: Ian McFadyen
- Written by: Ian McFadyen; Mary-Anne Fahey; Graeme Farmer; Patrick Edgeworth; Marilyn O'Donnell; Robert Adams; Brendan Luno; Elizabeth Coleman; Ron Challinor; David Taft; Mandy Hampson; Bill Garner; Clare Madsen
- Directed by: Kevin Carlin; Tina Butler; Mike Smith; Charles 'Bud' Tingwell; Peter Andrikidis; Kendal Flanagan; Ian Gilmour; Julie Bates; Andrew Friedman
- Starring: Annie Jones; Christopher Gabardi; Sandy Gore; Sandie Lillingston; Joseph Clements; Cathy Godbold
- Composer: Chris Pettifer
- Country of origin: Australia
- Original language: English
- No. of seasons: 4
- No. of episodes: 52

Production
- Executive producers: Ian McFadyen; John Kearney; Terry Ohlssen; Des Monaghan
- Producers: David Taft; Charles 'Bud' Tingwell
- Production location: Australia
- Running time: 25 minutes
- Production company: Crawford Productions

Original release
- Network: Seven Network
- Release: 20 February 1993 – 16 March 1994

Newlyweds is an Australian television sitcom that originally aired on the Seven Network for two seasons from 20 February 1993 to 16 March 1994. The series was created by Ian McFadyen and produced by David Taft. It was written by McFadyen, Mary-Anne Fahey and Graeme Farmer.

The show centres on young couple Allie Carter (Annie Jones) and Peter Roberts (Christopher Gabardi) as they embark on married life, with constant interruptions from their families and friends.

== Cast ==
=== Main / regular ===
- Annie Jones as Allie Carter
- Christopher Gabardi as Peter Roberts
- Sandy Gore as Irene Carter
- Cathy Godbold as Jules Carter
- Joseph Clements as Simmo
- Sandie Lillingston as Marnie Phelps
- Valentina Levkowicz as Bev Roberts
- Denis Moore as Ross Roberts
- Ross Williams as Eric Kaufman
- Elisha Hall as Kelly
- Jason Torrens as Duncan

=== Guests / recurring ===
- Alethea McGrath as Aunty Rose (1 episode)
- Alwyn Kurts as Archie (1 episode)
- Caitlin McDougall as Tracy (1 episode)
- David Argue as Uri (2 episodes)
- Jansen Spencer
- John Wood as Frank (4 episodes)
- Joy Smithers as Amanda (1 episode)
- Matthew Turner as Matt (4 episodes)
- Richard Grieve as Charles (1 episode)
- Rod Mullinar as Kirby Hacker (2 episodes)
- Roz Hammond as Sarah (1 episode)
- Scott Major (1 episode)
- Sue Jones as Velda (1 episode)
- Tiriel Mora as Delivery Man (1 episode)

== Production ==
A pilot for the series was produced in Melbourne by Crawford Productions in early 1992. Written by Ian McFadyen and Mary-Anne Fahey, it starred Lisa McCune, Katrina Foster, Richard Healey, Cathy Godbold, Rhys Muldoon, Stewart Faichney and Tenley Gilmore. Georgie Parker was originally offered McCune's role, but had to turn it down due to other commitments. In April 1992, Jacqueline Lee Lewis of The Sydney Morning Herald reported that Crawfords would re-shoot the pilot for Seven Network after recasting several roles. After the second pilot was filmed, Lee Lewis reported that Seven liked the show's concept and were waiting on the scripts before giving it "final approval", but a tentative production date of August 1992 had been set.

== Reception ==
Peter Holmes of The Sydney Morning Herald initially observed that "Newlyweds appears nothing more than Romeo and Juliet, badly done for the millionth time." Holmes admitted to openly laughing four times, especially at scenes involving Gore's "ice-bitch" character. The Age's Mark Lawrence thought the show was the most promising out of the recent locally produced sitcoms. He praised Gabardi's performance, saying that he has "good timing and clearly relishes his opportunity", while he found Jones was "a perfect match" for him. Like Holmes, Lawrence enjoyed Gore's performance as Irene, writing "If one must single out a star in this series, it's her. Such is the presence she creates."

Lawrence's fellow critic Geoff Slattery gave the show a more negative review, describing it as "a fatuous, demeaning, anti-intellectual series based on one sentence of concept: 'Newlyweds deals with problems familiar to all young couples.'" Slattery felt that the show was full of bad stereotypes and had "no redeeming social values, perceptions, or understanding of either newlyweds, or the Australia of the '90s."

== See also ==
- List of Australian television series
