= Daybreak Pacific =

New Zealand film and television company

Daybreak Pacific Ltd is a New Zealand film and television company. It produces low-budget films and programmes for the local and international market, often in association with other production or financing companies. It also known as Daybreak Pictures.

It is managed by brothers Grant Bradley and Dale G Bradley, who produce and direct much of the work.

== Major productions ==
=== Chunuk Bair (1992) ===
Chunuk Bair is a film, based on Maurice Shadbolt's play Once on Chunuk Bair. Set during the Gallipoli campaign of World War I, it follows the fortunes of one regiment attempting to hold Chunuk Bair. It stars Robert Powell.

=== Ozzie (2001) ===
A family film about an Australian koala. Starring Joan Collins and Rachel Hunter.

== Cast ==
- Spencer Breslin - Justin Morton
- Joan Collins - Max Happy
- Rachel Hunter - Beth Morton
- Ralf Moeller - Tank Emerson
- Peter Rowley - Buzz Maroni
- Bruce Allpress - Charlie Foster
- Anton Tennet - Darryl
- Steven Riley - Ngundi
- Beryl TeWiata - Secretary
- Daniel Millaire - Maitre'D

=== Treasure Island Kids (2004) ===
A film trilogy comprising: The Battle of Treasure Island, The Monster of Treasure Island and The Mystery of Treasure Island. Starring Beth Allen Nicko Vella and directed by Michael Hurst and Gavin Scott.

== Other productions ==
- Hot Shotz (children's television mini-series)
- Chill Factor
- God's Outlaw
- Repeat Performance
- Lost Valley
- Wild Blue
- No One Can Hear You (2001)
- Kid's World (2001)
- Route 9 (2001)
- Cupid's Prey (2002)
- Hope Ranch (2002)
- Terror Peak (2002)
- Vector File (2002)
