= Chunuk Bair (film) =

- Movie poster
- Directed by: Dale G. Bradley
- Written by: Grant Hinden-Miller
- Produced by: Grant Bradley; David Arnell
- Starring: Robert Powell
- Cinematography: Warrick Attewell
- Edited by: Paul Sutorius
- Music by: Stephen Bell-Booth
- Release date: 1992
- Running time: 110 minutes
- Country: New Zealand
- Language: English

Chunuk Bair is a 1992 New Zealand film based on the play Once on Chunuk Bair (1982) by Maurice Shadbolt.

Set in 1915, the film tells of the Wellington Regiment, part of the New Zealand Expeditionary Force present at Gallipoli during World War I. On 8 August 1915, the Regiment took and held Chunuk Bair, one of the Turkish hills.

Chunuk Bair was produced by Daybreak Pictures in association with Avalon and the National Film Unit. It was released to roughly coincide with Anzac Day, the national day of Remembrance in New Zealand and Australia.

The central characters are Frank South (Robert Powell) and Colonel William Connolly (Kevin Wilson) who have differing opinions about the battle.

== Cast ==
- Robert Powell as Sgt Maj Frank Smith
- Kevin J. Wilson as Connolly
- John Leigh as Porky
- Murray Keane as Smiler
- Danny Mulheron as Bassett
- Richard Hanna as Lt Harkness
- Lewis Rowe as Johnston
- Norman Forsey as Hamilton
- Darryl Beattie as Scruffy
- John Wraight as Mac
- Peter Kaa as Otaki George
- Stephen Ure as Holy
- Jed Brophy as Private Fred South
- David Calvert, Danny (the finger) Gilhooly, Steve (IB) Boyd, Craig Holden - extras.

Karl Urban makes his film debut as a young soldier.

== Crew ==
- Producer: Grant Bradley
- Exec Producers: Grant Bradley, David Arnell
- Director: Dale G Bradley
- Writer: Grant Hinden-Miller, adapted from the play by Maurice Shadbolt
- Cinematographer: Waka Attewell
