= Celeste Barber =

Australian comedian and media personality

- Born: Australia
- Occupations: Comedian, actress, author
- Years active: 2006–present
- Known for: The Letdown; Wellmania; All Saints
- Spouse: Api Robin
- Children: 2
- Website: celestebarber.com

Celeste Barber is an Australian comedian and media personality.

== Early life and education ==
Barber grew up in Terranora, on the far north coast of New South Wales coast. She has one sibling, a sister, Olivia. She was diagnosed with ADD at the age of 16, while attending Saint Joseph's College, Tweed Heads.

Leaving school and home aged 17, she trained in acting at drama school at University of Western Sydney's Theatre Nepean, graduating in 2002.

== Career ==
=== Acting ===
Barber became known for her role of paramedic Bree Matthews in the TV show All Saints (2005–2009), and for her roles in Office Correctness (a short video) and How Not to Behave.

Barber was a sketch writer/performer on The Matty Johns Show.

She stars in the lead role of the 2023 Netflix comedy Wellmania, which is an adaptation of journalist Brigid Delaney's memoir, Wellmania: Misadventures in the Search for Wellness. In the series, she performs all her own stunts.

=== Comedy ===
Although Barber started out in acting, she later started doing comedy. Barber states: "I've always been told I've been funny but I always thought funny was stupid. I thought if you were a bit of an idiot then that was funny. But I've since learnt, no, not the case, and being funny is the best and I love it… My late friend Mark Priestley, who worked on All Saints with me, was like, 'This is your niche', and he helped me focus on it".

In 2015 she was a Melbourne International Comedy Festival Raw Comedy state finalist, and sold out shows for both the Sydney Comedy and Adelaide Fringe festivals.

=== Writing ===
Barber's first book, Challenge Accepted, was published in September 2018. She describes it as "253 Steps to becoming an anti-it girl".

Her second book was a children's book titled Celeste the Giraffe Loves to Laugh, published in October 2019.

Her third book, Flamingo Celeste is Not like the Rest, illustrated by Heath McKenzie and published in 2021, was shortlisted for the picture book prize at the 2022 West Australian Young Readers' Book Awards.

=== Instagram ===
In early January 2015, the earliest instances of Barber recreating photos of celebrities began to emerge on her Instagram, after Celeste and her sister had been sending each other text messages of how women are supposed to do everyday activities and poking fun at the depiction. She posted her photos to Instagram with the hashtag "#celestechallengeaccepted". After posting only a few, one in which Barber imitated a photo of Kim Kardashian in flimsy lingerie, lying on a mound of dirt went viral. Her posts showed up how absurd and false celebrity social media accounts are.

In September 2018, Barber was featured in comedy videos released by Tom Ford. The three videos, posted to Barber's and Ford's respective Instagram accounts, show Ford teaching Barber how to walk in his shows, while she attempts to sneak some of the clothes home in her bag. The video played at the after party of Ford's show, which opened New York Fashion Week. The videos come after the pair collaborated on a previous comedy video featuring Ford and Barber vigorously making out in an airport terminal.

=== Other work ===
Barber has been a panelist on Have You Been Paying Attention? and also was a co-host on morning TV talk show Studio 10.

During the 2019–20 Australian bushfire season Barber launched a fundraising appeal with a target of raising A$15,000 for the New South Wales Rural Fire Service's RFS Brigades Donation Fund. The fundraiser went on to raise over A$50 million, making it the largest ever held on Facebook. After the money was raised, Celeste learned that the RFS Fund was by law restricted to providing training, resources and equipment for the RFS, and could not be redirected to affected communities as she intended. The RFS and Barber's legal team worked together to find a way to disburse the funds more widely. In May 2020, the Supreme Court ruled that the funds could not go to other charities.

In October 2023, Barber signed an open letter of Artists4Ceasefire during the Israeli bombardment of Gaza. Barber has a podcast called Celeste & Her Best. In July 2024, Barber and business partner Claire Greaves launched a makeup brand called Booie Beauty.

== International fame ==
Barber has appeared on the covers of Vogue Australia and Vogue Portugal. She has been interviewed by Drew Barrymore and Jimmy Kimmel, and her fans include Kris Jenner and Cindy Crawford.

As a social media influencer, she has found fame by creating videos satirising the image of celebrities presented to the world, juxtaposing them to her lived experience as a woman and a mother. She has many videos of how models pose, versus the same pose on herself as an every-day woman.

== Personal life ==
Barber married Api Robin, and they have two sons. Robin has two daughters from a previous relationship. On 13 February 2026, the couple announced their split after 20 years together.

== Filmography ==
=== Television ===
Year	Title	Role	Notes	Ref.
2005–2009	All Saints	Bree Matthews	87 episodes	
2010	Home and Away	Journalist	1 episode	
2010	Home and Away	Megan	1 episode	
2015	Wonderland	Celebrant	1 episode	
2015	How Not to Behave	Ensemble Cast	15 episodes	
2016	Comedy Showroom : The Letdown: TV Short	Barbara	1 episode	
2016–2019	The Letdown	Barbara	9 episodes	
2019	Gay of Thrones	Celeste	1 episode	
2020	The Plop: Podcast for Kids	The Plop Contributor	1 episode	
2023	Wellmania	Liv Healy (main)	8 episodes	
2023	The Way We Wore	Self	3 episodes	
2024	Colin from Accounts	Katie Crapp	2 episodes	
2026	Colin from Accounts	Katie Crapp	Episode: "Is That All There Is?"	
TBA	CoDependant			

=== Film ===
Year	Title	Role	Notes
2006	Burke & Wills	Jackie	
2012	Office Correctness	Michelle	Video
2021	Back to the Outback	Skylar	Voice
2022	Seriously Red	Teeth	
2024	Runt	Susie Shearer	

Producing/Writer
Year	Title	Role	Notes
2011	Late Night Angel Weenie Boy	Writer	
2012	Office Correctness	Writer	
2019	Celeste Barber: Challenge Accepted	Writer	
2022	Embrace Kids	Executive producer	
2023	Wellmania	Executive producer	8 episodes
2023	Celeste Barber, Fine, Thanks	Writer	TV Special
TBA	CoDependant	Writer/producer	

=== Stand-up specials ===
- Challenge Accepted (Comedy Dynamics, 2019)
- Fine, Thanks (Netflix, 2023)
