= List of Frontline (Australian TV series) episodes =

Frontline is an Australian comedy television series which satirised Australian television current affairs programmes and reporting. It ran for three series of 13 half-hour episodes and was broadcast on ABC TV in 1994, 1995, and 1997.

== Series overview ==
Series	Episodes	Originally released	
Series	Episodes	First released	Last released
1	13	9 May 1994	1 August 1994
2	13	24 July 1995	16 October 1995
3	13	24 February 1997	19 May 1997

== Episodes ==
=== Season 1 (1994) ===
No. overall	No. in season	Title	Original release date
1	1	"The Soufflé Rises"	9 May 1994
2	2	"The Desert Angel"	16 May 1994
3	3	"City of Fear"	23 May 1994
4	4	"She's Got the Look"	30 May 1994
5	5	"The Siege"	6 June 1994
6	6	"Playing the Ego Card"	13 June 1994
7	7	"We Ain't Got Dames"	20 June 1994
8	8	"The Art of Gentle Persuasion"	27 June 1994
9	9	"The Invisible Man"	4 July 1994
10	10	"Add Sex and Stir"	11 July 1994
11	11	"Smaller Fish to Fry"	18 July 1994
12	12	"Judge and Jury"	25 July 1994
13	13	"This Night of Nights"	1 August 1994

=== Season 2 (1995) ===
No. overall	No. in season	Title	Original release date
14	1	"One Big Family"	24 July 1995
15	2	"Workin' Class Man"	31 July 1995
16	3	"Heroes & Villains"	7 August 1995
17	4	"Office Mole"	14 August 1995
18	5	"Basic Instincts"	21 August 1995
19	6	"Let the Children Play"	28 August 1995
20	7	"Divide the Community, Multiply the Ratings"	4 September 1995
21	8	"Keeping Up Appearances"	11 September 1995
22	9	"All Work and No Fame"	18 September 1995
23	10	"Changing the Face of Current Affairs"	25 September 1995
24	11	"A Man of His Convictions"	2 October 1995
25	12	"The Great Pretenders"	9 October 1995
26	13	"Give 'em Enough Rope"	16 October 1995

=== Season 3 (1997) ===
No. overall	No. in season	Title	Original release date
27	1	"Dick on the Line"	24 February 1997
28	2	"My Generation"	3 March 1997
29	3	"The Shadow We Cast"	10 March 1997
30	4	"One Rule for One"	17 March 1997
31	5	"A Hole in the Heart – Part 1"	24 March 1997
32	6	"A Hole in the Heart – Part 2"	31 March 1997
33	7	"The Simple Life"	7 April 1997
34	8	"I Get the Big Names"	14 April 1997
35	9	"The Art of the Interview"	21 April 1997
36	10	"'I' Disease"	28 April 1997
37	11	"Addicted to Fame"	5 May 1997
38	12	"The Code"	12 May 1997
39	13	"Epitaph"	19 May 1997
