= Kevin J. Wilson =

New Zealand actor

- Born: New Zealand
- Education: University of Auckland
- Occupation: Actor
- Years active: 1966–current
- Known for: Chances; Shortland Street; RFDS; Frontline; Spartacus

Kevin J. Wilson is a New Zealand actor. He is best known for his performance as Sam Murphy on the satirical Frontline and his role as Senator Albinus on Starz TV series Spartacus.

== Early life ==
Wilson began his acting career at Auckland University. He trained as a classical actor and appeared in stage plays.

== Career ==
One of Wilson's earliest television appearances was in a guest role in New Zealand drama series Pukemanu in 1971. He portrayed Sir Malcolm in the erotic Australian soap opera Chances for 6 episodes. and then played a regular ongoing role as Declan Kennedy in Shortland Street in 1993. He went on to play recurring roles as Ted Eastman in RFDS (1993–1994) and as Sam Murphy in Frontline (1995). He more recently featured as General Egremont in Legend of the Seeker (2009–2010, and as Senator Albinus in 5 episodes of Spartacus from (2010–2012).

Wilson portrayed photographer Alfred Burton in 1981 biopic Pictures. Other film credits include 1984 drama Wild Horses, 1990 Jane Campion film An Angel at My Table and 1992 war film Chunuk Bair. He has also directed several shorts.

Wilson has been nominated for Best Actor and Best Supporting Actor awards in New Zealand and Australia 15 times.

== Filmography ==
=== Film ===
Year	Title	Role	Type
1978	Skin Deep	Policeman	Feature film
1981	Pictures	Alfred Burton	Feature film
1983	Wild Horses	Harry	TV movie
1985	Kingpin	Len Crawford	Feature film
1986	Dangerous Orphans	Inspector Lucas	Feature film
1990	An Angel at My Table	Janet's father	Feature film
1992	Chunuk Bair	Connolly	Feature film
1998	Lost Valley	Tom Blake	Feature film
2001	Exposure	Father Close	Film
2002	Blood Crime	Smitty	TV movie
2003	Murder on the Blade	Crown Prosecutor	TV documentary movie
2004	Roach		Short Film
2004	Ike: Countdown to D-Day	Rear Admiral Bertram Ramsay	TV movie
2004	Spooked	Mike Taylor	Feature film
2005	Luella Miller	Peter	Feature film

=== Television ===
Year	Title	Role	Type
1966–1970	Skippy the Bush Kangaroo		TV series
1969	The Alpha Plan	Carl's Henchman	TV series
1971	Pukemanu		TV series, season 1, episode 2: "Risk Extreme"
1972	Behind the Legend	Les Darcy	TV series
1975–1983	Close to Home		TV series
1976–1978	Joe and Koro	George	TV series
1977	The Mackenzie Affair		Miniseries
1977–1980	A Haunting We Will Go	Major Toom	TV series
1980–1984	Mortimer's Patch		TV series
1982	Casualties of Peace	Ginger	TV series
1982	Loose Enz	Andy	TV series, season 1, episode 2: "Coming and Going"
1982–1983	Both Sides of the Fence	Bob Abbott	TV series
1983	Sea Urchins	Dan Smart	TV series, season 3, episode 5
1984	Inside Straight	Bourke	TV series, season 1, episode 6: "Taxi Hijack"
1985	Roche	Stan Nolan	TV series, season 1, episode 3: "Squeeze Me, Honey, Honey"
1986	Seekers		TV series
1987	Erebus: The Aftermath		TV series
1987–1990	Gloss		TV series
1989–1991	Shark in the Park	Sergeant Jesson	TV series
1992	G.P.	Kevin Allsop	TV series, season 4, episode 23: "All Care Taken"
1992–1994	Marlin Bay	Hamish Saunders	TV series
1991–1992	Chances	Sir Malcolm Watkins	TV series, 6 episodes
1993; 2002–2003	Shortland Street	Dave Greenlaw / Declan Kennedy	TV series, 82 episodes
1993–1994	R.F.D.S.	Ted Eastman	TV series, 13 episodes
1995	Frontline	Sam Murphy	TV series, season 2, 13 episodes
1996	Xena: Warrior Princess	Xerxes	TV series, season 1, episode 11: "The Black Wolf"
1996	Ngā Puna: Small Town Blues		TV series
1999	The Length of Memory	Blighty	TV series
2002	Mercy Peak	Ian Enderby	TV series, season 2, episode 5: "Death and Taxes"
2009	Power Rangers RPM	Commander Murdoch	TV series, season 1, episode 20: "Heroes Among Us"
2009; 2010	Legend of the Seeker	General Egremont	TV series, seasons 1–2, 8 episodes
2010; 2012	Spartacus	Senator Albinus	TV series, seasons 1–2, 5 episodes
2016	Terry Teo	Larry	TV series, season 1, episode 3: "Baby Takes a Bullet"
2016; 2017	The Shannara Chronicles	Bremen	TV series, 2 episodes

== Theatre ==
=== As actor ===
Year	Title	Role	Type
1978	The Merchant of Venice	Bassanio	Hannah Playhouse, Wellington
1979	Flying Blind	Mac	Hannah Playhouse, Wellington
1979	Macbeth	Macbeth	Opera House, Wellington with Downstage Theatre Company
1995	The Learner's Stand	Pete the shearer	Herald Theatre, Auckland with Auckland Theatre Company

=== As director ===
Year	Title	Role	Type
1974	The Nuns	Director	Independent Theatre, Auckland
1998	The Baltimore Waltz	Director	Silo Theatre, Auckland
