= Genevieve Mooy =

Australian actress

- Occupation: Actor
- Years active: 1984-present
- Known for: Wellmania

Genevieve Mooy is an Australian actress. She has had a career on both stage and screen.

== Career ==
Mooy has appeared in stage productions such as Coral Browne - This F***ing Lady and The Appleton Ladies’ Potato Race.

She was a regular on the first two series of Frontline. She was nominated for the AFI Award for Best Actress in a Supporting Role in 1985 for Emoh Ruo.

In March 2022, Mooy was named in the cast for Netflix series Wellmania. Mooy reunited onscreen with Celeste Barber, as Mooy taught Barber while she was in drama school.

== Filmography ==
=== Film ===
| Year | Title | Role | Notes |
|---|---|---|---|
| 2020 | Escape from Pretoria | Marcia | Feature film |
| 2020 | Never Too Late | Nurse Bea | Feature film |
| 2019 | The Battle for Jericho | Sarah | |
| 2012 | A Lot Like Christmas | Janet | Short film |
| 2012 | Three Sixty | Waitress | Short film |
| 2000 | A Once Smiling Woman | Lucy | Short film |
| 2000 | The Dish | May | Feature film |
| 1999 | Passion | Ada Crossley | Feature film |
| 1999 | Jungle Bunny | Clarissa Penfold | Short film |
| 1997 | The Towers | Noeline Bogan | TV movie |
| 1997 | Thank God He Met Lizzie | Mrs Jamieson | Feature film |
| 1987 | Traveling North | Gallery Attendant | Feature film |
| 1985 | Rooted | Sandy | TV movie |
| 1985 | Emoh Ruo | Margaret York | Feature film |
| 1984 | Fast Talking | Yates' Secretary | Feature film |
| 1984 | Man of Letters | Con | TV movie |

=== Television ===
| Year | Title | Role | Notes | Ref |
|---|---|---|---|---|
| 2026 | My Brilliant Career | Mrs O'Brien | TV series | |
| 2025 | RFDS | Linda Martin | TV series: 1 episode | |
| 2023 | Wellmania | Lorraine Healy | TV series, 8 episodes | |
| 2017 | Rosehaven | Pam | TV series, 1 episode | |
| 2015 | Deadline Gallipoli | Lady Churchill | TV miniseries, 2 episodes | |
| 2012 | Rake | Faye | TV series, 1 episode | |
| 2011 | At Home with Julia | Tim's Salon Customer | TV series, 1 episode | |
| 2011 | The Jesters | Elaine | TV series, 1 episode | |
| 2005 | Poolside | | | |
| 2001 | Love is a Four Letter Word | Evelyn Richards | TV series, 2 episodes | |
| 2000 | Water Rats | Marie Chapple | TV series, 2 episodes | |
| 1997-98 | Murder Call | Lorelei Brady | TV series, 2 episodes | |
| 1998 | Breakers | Shirley Donnelly | TV series | |
| 1997 | Bullpitt! | | TV series, 1 episode | |
| 1996 | After the Beep | Mae Santos | TV series, 7 episodes | |
| 1994-95 | Frontline | Jan Whelan | TV series, 17 episodes | |
| 1994 | The Ferals | Mandy Matthews | TV series, 1 episodes | |
| 1993 | G.P. | Elizabeth Coulson | TV series, 1 episode | |
| 1992 | Police Rescue | Mrs Scanlon | TV series, 1 episode | |
| 1991 | Brides of Christ | Judith Fitzgerald | TV miniseries. 2 episodes | |
| 1989 | A Country Practice | Prue Rankin | TV series, 2 episodes | |
| 1984 | Bodyline | Flapper 2 | TV miniseries, 2 episodes | |

== Stage ==
| Year | Title | Role | Notes | Ref |
|---|---|---|---|---|
| 1979 | The Birthday Party | | St James' Hall, Sydney | |
| 1981 | All's Well That Ends Well | | Jane Street Theatre | |
| 1982 | Nervous System | | University of NSW | |
| 1982 | Camino Real | | University of NSW | |
| 1982 | The Crucible | | University of NSW, Canberra Theatre Centre, University of Newcastle | |
| 1982 | Bitter Sweet | | University of NSW | |
| 1983 | There's a Ghost on Clark Island! | | Nimrod Theatre Company on Clark Island, Sydney | |
| 1984 | The Servant of Two Masters | | Nimrod Theatre Company | |
| 1986 | The Bitter Tears of Petra von Kant | | Wharf Theatre | |
| 1986 | The Real Thing | | Playhouse, Newcastle | |
| 1987 | Emerald City | | Playhouse, Melbourne | |
| 1997 | What the Butler Saw | | Russell Street Theatre, Athenaeum Theatre | |
| 1987 | A Chorus of Disapproval | | Playhouse, Melbourne, Canberra Theatre | |
| 1987 | Emerald City | | Playhouse, Melbourne | |
| 1988 | Haircut | | Wharf Theatre | |
| 1988 | Strictly Ballroom | | Wharf Theatre | |
| 1988 | Angels | | Wharf Theatre | |
| 1989 | Jigsaws | | Q Theatre, Penrith | |
| 1990 | The Odd Couple | | Comedy Theatre, Melbourne, Majestic Cinemas | |
| 1991 | Daylight Saving | | Playhouse, Newcastle | |
| 1991 | Hansel and Gretel | | Belvoir Street Theatre | |
| 1993 | Absent Friends | | Marian Street Theatre | |
| 1994 | A Little Like Drowning | | Playhouse, Adelaide | |
| 1996 | Las Meninas: The Secret Beyond the Door | | Synagogue Place, Adelaide | |
| 2000 | Chambres | | Belvoir Street Theatre | |
| 2001 | The Small Poppies | | Sydney Opera House | |
| 2004 | The Vagina Monologues | | University of Sydney | |
| 2006 | Finn City | | Darlinghurst Theatre | |
| 2010 | A Day in the Death of Joe Egg | | Australian tour | |
| 2010 | The Seagull | | Sidetrack Theatre | |
| 2012 | The New Electric Ballroom | | Stables Theatre, Sydney | |
| 2013 | Maggie Stone | | Space Theatre, Adelaide | |
| 2018 | This F***ing Lady: The Coral Browne Story | Coral Browne | 45downstairs, SA German Club, Adelaide | |
| 2020 | Our Town | | Flinders University | |
| 2021 | The Appleton Ladies’ Potato Race | | Ensemble Theatre & Royalty Theatre, Adelaide | |
| 2023 | Camp | | Seymour Centre | |
| 2024 | The Children | | State TheatreCompany (South Australia) | |
