= Matt Drummond =

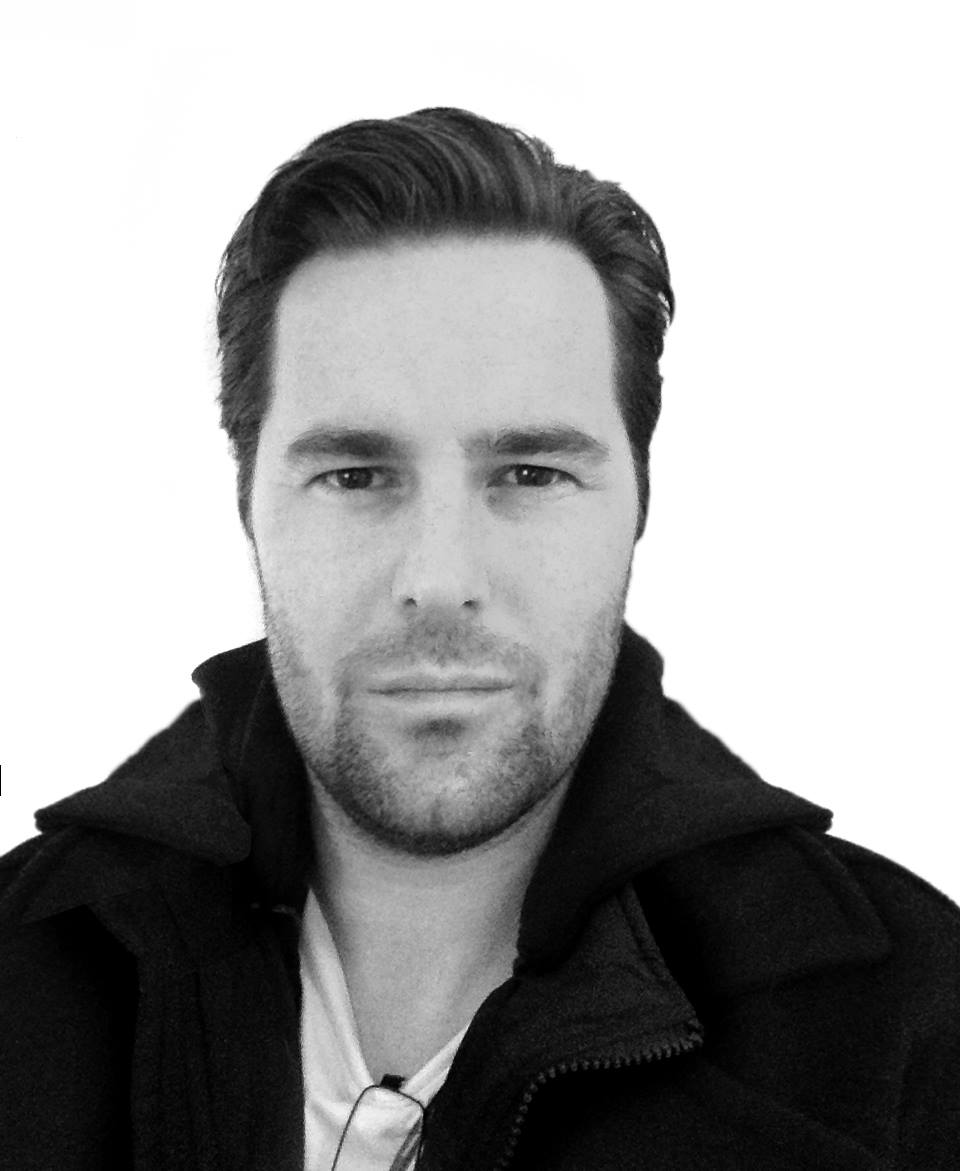
- Matt Drummond (2014)
- Born: Sydney, Australia
- Citizenship: Australian
- Occupations: Film director, screenwriter, VFX supervisor
- Years active: 1993–present
- Spouse: Megan Drummond
- Awards: 2014 News & Documentary Emmy

Matthew Simon Drummond is an Australian film director, screenwriter and visual effects supervisor.

== Personal ==
Matthew Drummond is the eldest child of musician Pat Drummond and the brother of Pete Drummond from the Australasian band Dragon.

== Career ==
In 1998 Drummond opened the visual effects agency, Hive Studios International. During this time he began work with Catalyst, under scientist and filmmaker, Richard Smith. Smith and Drummond have collaborated on several documentaries. In 1993 Drummond opened his first graphics company named Extra Digital.

In 2008 the Blue Mountains regional business chamber named Hive Studios International Business of the Year and Arts and Culture Business of the Year, and the company subsequently worked with Discovery Channel USA, National Geographic USA, and History Channel USA. This work resulted in a 2014 News & Documentary Emmy Award for Graphic Design and Art Direction.

Drummond's work extended into providing 3D VFX installations for the Australian Museum.

== Film ==
Drummond began to develop in-house productions during his time in Vanuatu in 2009–2013. While living in Vanuatu, Drummond met long time Hollywood producer Paul Mason, who suggested that Drummond should produce a film, rather than the television series as planned. Mason was later listed in the credits of Dinosaur Island.

In 2011, Drummond began writing Dinosaur Island. Principal photography began in October 2011 on the island of Efate. Drummond returned to Australia in 2013 to complete Post Production on the film, where Jason Moody signed on as Executive Producer and Chris Wright as Composer. Hive Studios International completed visual effects on the film. The international rights to Dinosaur Island were acquired at the 2014 Cannes Film Festival by Arclight Films, and were later sold into over 50 countries. The film premiered on 14 February 2015 and was released in Australia on 28 February 2015. It remained in cinemas for approximately 5 weeks. The film was the first theatrical release to feature a feathered dinosaur.

Drummond's next film, My Pet Dinosaur (2017), was acquired by Faisal Toor of Empress Road Pictures at the 2015 American Film Market. Pinnacle Films acquired the Australian/New Zealand theatrical rights for a release on April 22, 2017.

In 2023, Drummond wrote and directed the fantasy-adventure film, The Secret Kingdom.

== Filmography ==
- 2023 The Secret Kingdom - (Feature Film) (Director/Writer)
- 2017 My Pet Dinosaur (Feature Film) (Director/Writer/producer/VFX Supervisor)
- 2014 Dinosaur Island (Feature Film) (Director/Writer/VFX Supervisor)
- 2013 First Footprints (TV Documentary) (Visual Effects Supervisor)
- 2013 Big History (TV Series) (Visual Effects Supervisor)
- 2012 Australia: The Time Traveller's Guide (TV Movie documentary) (Digital effects)
- 2011 Grimm (US TV Series) (1 episode, Pilot) - (Digital effects)
- 2011 Dinosaur Stampede (TV Documentary) (Visual effects supervisor)
- 2010 Cane Toads: An Unnatural History (Feature Film) (Digital effects)
- 2010 Voyage to the Planets (TV Documentary) (Visual effects supervisor)
- 2009 Prehistoric New York (TV Documentary) (Visual effects supervisor)
- 2009 Death of the Megabeasts (TV Movie documentary) (Visual effects supervisor)
- 2008 Life After People (TV Movie documentary) (Visual effects supervisor)
- 2008 Prehistoric Predators II (TV Series) (Visual effects supervisor)
- 2007 Prehistoric Predators (TV Series) (Visual effects supervisor)
- 2007 Crude: The Incredible Journey of Oil (Documentary) (visual effects supervisor)
- 2005 Supernova (TV Series) (Visual effects supervisor)
- 2005 Attack of the Sabertooth (TV Movie) (Visual effects director)
- 2005 Saturn, Planet of the rings (TV Series) (Digital effects)
- 2004 Animal Face Off (TV Series) (Visual effects supervisor)
- 1998 Rumble in the Jungle (TV Documentary) (Digital effects)
- 1998 Silent Sentinels (TV Documentary) (Digital effects)

== Awards ==
Year	Award	Category	Production	Result	Ref.
2008	Primetime Emmy Award	Outstanding Special Visual Effects for a Miniseries, Movie or a Special	Life After People (2008)	Nominated	
2009	AFI Award	Best Visual Effects	Death of the Megabeasts (2009)	Nominated	
2012	News & Documentary Emmy Award	Outstanding Individual Achievement in a Craft: Graphic Design and Art Direction	History of the World in 2 Hours (2011)	Nominated	
2013	AEAF Animation Award	Commercials Animation	Tyrannosaurs (2014)	Nominated	
2014	News & Documentary Emmy Award	Outstanding Individual Achievement in a Craft: Graphic Design and Art Direction	Big History (2013)	Won	
2015	AEAF Animation Award	Feature Film Animation	Dinosaur Island (2014)	Nominated	

== Other roles ==
- Ambassador for the Blue Mountains Economic Enterprise (BMEE) brand - Mtns Made He is featured in both the campaign video and broadsheet.
- 2015, 2016: Presented at the Blue Lab creative industries symposia
- 2016: Featured speaker at the Vivid Ideas Festival held at the Museum of Contemporary Art, Sydney
- 2017: consulted on "The House Standing Committee on Communications and the Arts' 2017 inquiry into factors contributing to the growth and sustainability of the Australian film and television industry."
