= Dinosaur Island (2014 film) =

- Australian film poster
- Directed by: Matt Drummond
- Written by: Matt Drummond; Megan Williams
- Produced by: Matt Drummond; Jason Moody; Megan Williams
- Starring: Darius Williams; Kate Rasmussen
- Cinematography: Matt Drummond
- Music by: Chris Wright
- Distributed by: Arclight Films
- Release dates: 29 September 2014 (United Kingdom); 14 February 2015 (Australia)
- Running time: 88 minutes
- Countries: United Kingdom; Australia
- Language: English

Dinosaur Island (also known as Journey to Dinosaur Island in the UK) is a 2014 British-Australian family adventure film. The film is written and directed by Matt Drummond and co-produced by Jason Moody and Megan Williams. It focuses on an island where a special kind of crystal acts as a portal that can bring different things from different times on the island.

The film was inspired by a conversation between Drummond and American film producer Paul Mason while both were living on the South Pacific Island of Vanuatu. Journey to Dinosaur Island has also been called the first feature film to depict a feathered Tyrannosaurus.

== Plot ==
Lucas, a 13-year-old boy, visits his grandmother's old house which is now set 'for sale'. There, while exploring the bookshelves, he finds a crystal in a box. Interested, he takes it with him. The adventure begins when, in his plane, he puts the crystal onto the next empty seat and it starts to glow. A disaster strikes the plane and Lucas finds himself stranded in a strange land littered with ghost ships and prehistoric creatures. While searching for other signs of life, Lucas hears a radio broadcast in the distance and is drawn into the jungle, where he encounters a beautiful young girl Kate, who claims to be from the 1950s. He learns that Kate used to possess a similar crystal like the one Lucas has. She gives him her diary which she denotes as ‘Survival Guide’ for Lucas. He also meets a Sinornithosaurus whom Kate named Mimos. Mimos is able to imitate any sound he hears, similar to the lyrebird. After a minor earthquake, Lucas learns that mists forms during earthquakes and brings airplanes, like the one in which Lucas arrived, from different timezones including past and future. The airplanes are always empty but bring many useful things. When another airplane arrives, Lucas and Kate set of to explore it. At the same moment, some tribal people investigate the plane and capture the duo. On their way to the camp they encounter gigantic Pitcher Plants(Nepenthes) and Venus Flytraps . On reaching the village, they are put into a pyramid-shaped wooden cage. There, Lucas meets another prisoner who when sees the crystal in Lucas's hand and says it's called a ‘sing sing stone’. He whistles and mist forms over the crystal. This mist brings things from time. He says that these stone are present in larger form between the twin volcanoes and they are responsible for forming the mist and bringing planes on the island. Lucas concludes that it is a massive piezoelectric crystal cluster which attains its resonant frequency due to seismic activities and creates the portal which can also help him to get back home. He and Kate escape through an opening at the top of the cage. Kate frees some large pterosaurs, one of which gives them a ride towards the volcano twins although they have a bad landing. When a Tyrannosaurus chases them, Mimos imitates the roar and scares him away. Again some dromaeosaurs chase after them but they make their way to the cave between the volcanic twins.

Upon reaching the destination, Lucas fills a jar with water and creates the sound required to activate the crystals. Suddenly, one of the dromaeosaurs enters and catches Mimos. However they manage to beat him but lose their jar. Mimos wakes up, imitates the jar singing and flies away. The crystals start shining and the portal appears. But Kate says that she will not go back without her diary, which fell in a stone cavity. She insists that without proof the world will not believe them and Lucas must go into the portal as she will be right behind him. Lucas enters the portal and leaves the island behind.

He wakes up in a hospital and hears the news about a mysterious island. Soon he meets his grandma, Kathryn, who says she prefers Kate as Kathryn is so old fashioned. It is revealed that she is actually Kate whom Lucas met at the island. With the proof from her diary, she receives the Nobel Prize for Science. Back on the island, Mimos is seen peacefully riding on the back of the leader of a sauropod herd, and the film ends.

== Cast ==
- Darius Williams as Lucas Winton
- Kate Rasmussen as Kathryn Rose Thompson (young)
- Juliette Palmer as Kathryn Rose Thompson (adult)
- Nicole Yardley as Lydia Winton
- Paul Padagas as Jack Winton
- Joe Bistaveous as Ernest
- Tiriel Mora as Press Conference Host

== Production ==
The score to Journey to Dinosaur Island was composed by Chris Wright.

Visual effects were completed by Hive Studios International, with Matt Drummond acting as VFX Supervisor.

== Release ==
The international rights to Journey to Dinosaur Island were acquired at the 2014 Cannes Film Festival by Arclight Films and were later sold into over 50 countries internationally, outselling the local Australian film Paper Planes. The film premiered on 14 February 2015 and was released via Hoyts and United Cinemas in Australia on 28 February 2015. It remained in cinemas for approximately five weeks. The film has been released theatrically in Japan, Myanmar, Pakistan, Germany, Spain and New Zealand. Journey to Dinosaur Island is known as the first theatrical release to ever feature a feathered dinosaur.

Journey to Dinosaur Island was released worldwide on DVD, TV, and VOD platforms, reaching top 10 placing in Australia, New Zealand, and US iTunes charts.

== Accolades ==
Journey to Dinosaur Island was nominated for a 2015 AEAF Award for Feature Film Animation. The awards are given for creative technical excellence in the use of visual effects and animation in the creation of screened work.

== See also ==
- List of Australian films of 2014
- List of films featuring dinosaurs
