= Torquil Neilson =

Australian actor

Torquil Neilson is a former Australian actor.

Born in London and raised in Melbourne, Neilson is best known for his role as Jason Cotter in Frontline which he played from 1994 to 1997. Other television roles include Blue Heelers, The Secret Life of Us and Love My Way. He appeared in the films Love and Other Catastrophes (1996), Let's Get Skase (2001), He Died with a Felafel in His Hand (2001) and Packed to the Rafters (2010–2011). He also starred in the 2009 film Van Diemen's Land. As a stage actor, he performed in several professional productions.
