= Tiriel Mora =

Australian television and film actor (born 1958)

- Born: 19 October 1958 (age 67); Melbourne, Victoria, Australia
- Occupation: Actor
- Years active: 1982−present

Tiriel Mora (born 19 October 1958) is an Australian television and film actor.

== Early life ==
Tiriel Mora's parents were French-born visual artist Mirka Mora and German-born entrepreneur, art dealer and restaurateur Georges Mora. His older brothers are film director Philippe Mora and art dealer William Mora. He lived with his father in a hotel in St Kilda, and his mother lived nearby.

Mora decided that he wanted to be an actor at the age of five. When he turned eighteen he spent a year in London before returning to Australia to study at the University of New England. He was shortlisted for a place at the National Institute of Dramatic Art (NIDA) several times, but was unsuccessful.

== Career ==
Mora is best known for his roles as the hard-nosed journalist Martin 'Marty' Di Stasio, in the cult satirical television series Frontline, and as the bumbling local solicitor Dennis Denuto, in 1997 comedy film The Castle.

His other television credits include a guest role in long-running soap opera Neighbours (1986) as Roger Yates, playing a Nebari called Silas in Farscape (1999–2003), Judge Renmark in ABC-TV's legal drama Janet King (2014) and Henry Bowditch in critically acclaimed period drama Love Child. In 2018, he appeared in a recurring guest role in Home and Away as lawyer Kurt Adams.

Further film credits include the 1993 biographical film My Forgotten Man (aka Flynn) opposite Guy Pearce, 2000 slasher film Cut, 2002 comedy-drama Garage Days, 2002 horror film Queen of the Damned opposite Aaliyah, and 2005 Peter Jackson blockbuster King Kong, alongside fellow Australian Naomi Watts. He had a voice role in the 2006 animated film Happy Feet, and appeared in the family adventure films Dinosaur Island (2014) and My Pet Dinosaur (2017). In 2020, he played Marduk in the independent Australian children’s fantasy film The Legend of the Five.

Mora also appeared in Qantas television advertisements in the 2000s.

Mora has also appeared in several stage productions. He worked with the now-defunct Anthill Theatre in South Melbourne under director Jean-Pierre Mignon. In 2014, he was the associated artistic director of the Katoomba Theatre Company.

== Personal life ==
In 2014, Mora was living in the Blue Mountains in New South Wales, with his family.

== Filmography ==
=== Film ===
Year	Title	Role	Notes
1983	The Return of Captain Invincible	Graffiti Artist	Feature film
1984	Strikebound	Militant Miner	Film
1984	Street Hero	Junky	Feature film
1984	Channel Chaos	Police	Feature film
1990	A Kink in the Picasso	Stan	Feature film
1992	A Slow Night at the Kuwaiti Cafe	Rashid	Feature film
1993	My Forgotten Man (aka Flynn)	Sydney Station Porter	Feature film
1994	Future Shlock	Alvin	Film
1997	The Castle	Dennis Denuto	Feature film
2000	Cut	Archives Projectionist	Feature film
2001	Crocodile Dundee in Los Angeles	Tourist Couple	Feature film
2002	Queen of the Damned	Roger	Feature film
2002	Garage Days	Thommo	Feature film
2004	The Full Gamut	Ted Smith	Short film
2005	King Kong	Fruit Vendor	Feature film
2006	Happy Feet	Kev (voice)	Feature film
2006	Bye Bye Tim	Dad	Short film
2012	Windmills of my Mind	Rex	Short film
2013	Blue Drag	Donaldson	Short film
2013	The Wolverine	Attorney (uncredited)	Feature film
2014	Gecko	Barry	Short film
2014	Dinosaur Island	Press Conference Host	Feature film
2016	Gods of Egypt	Rich Man	Feature film
2017	The Last Babushka Doll	Jerry	Short film
2017	My Pet Dinosaur	Trevor Brown	Feature film
2017	Otherlife	Dr. Robert Amari	Feature film
2018	Harmony	Homeless Guy	Feature film
2021	The Face	US Marshall Hastings	Short film
2021	Shark	Sofie's Dad	Short film
2021	The Replica	Tom	Short film

=== Television ===
Year	Title	Role	Notes
1984	Prisoner	Kevin Stansfield	7 episodes
1986	Neighbours	Roger Yates	1 episode
1987	Nancy Wake	Judex	Miniseries, 1 episode
1990	Skirts	Jimmy	1 episode
1990	Friday on My Mind	Lawyer	Miniseries
1991	The Flying Doctors	Miner	1 episode
1991	Boys from the Bush	Mel	1 episode
1991	Pugwall	Okumura O'Shaughnessy	1 episode
1991	Col'n Carpenter	Marco	1 episode
1992	Phoenix	Gasper	1 episode
1993	Time Trax	Belmont / Bob Meyers	2 episodes
1993	Crimetime	Ambo Officer	TV movie
1993	Official Denial	Dos	TV movie
1994	Newlyweds	Delivery Man	1 episode
1994	Secrets	Carlo	1 episode
1994–1997	Frontline	Martin di Stasio	39 episodes
1995	Glued to the Tele	Narrator	TV movie
1995–2000	Blue Heelers	Dave / Sgt Cammello	2 episodes
1996	Shark Bay	Justin Farraday	
1997	Medivac	Dr Dexter Haben	2 episodes
1997	Roar	Brigg	1 episode
1998	Wildside	Tony Gorlass	2 episodes
1998	Water Rats	Alfred	1 episode
1998	Search for Treasure Island	Captain Escovar	6 episodes
1999	Farscape	Salis	1 episode
1999–2008	All Saints	David / Steve	2 episodes
2000	Stepsister from Planet Weird	S'vad / Fooop	TV movie
2000	Dogwoman: A Grrrl's Best Friend	Supt. Gary Brodziak	TV movie
2000	Grass Roots	David	3 episodes
2000	SeaChange	Derek Brewer	1 episode
2000	Tales of the South Seas		1 episode
2001	Elixir	George	
2002	Nova	Frank Hurley	1 episode
2002	The Secret Life of Us	Marty	1 episode
2002	Shock Jock	Neville Roach	13 episodes
2002	Heroes' Mountain	Mark Powderly	TV movie
2004	The Cooks	George	1 episode
2005	The Surgeon	Dr. Jordy Roberts	3 episodes
2005	Hell Has Harbour Views	Rob Carney	TV movie
2007	City Homicide	Gerald Fox	1 episode
2007	Dead End		
2008–2012	Underbelly	Andrew's Barrister / ATO Officer	2 episodes
2009	A Model Daughter: The Killing of Caroline Byrne	Rene Rivkin	TV movie
2010	Rake	Judge Ken	1 episode
2013	Absolutely Modern	Ern Malley	
2014	Janet King	Judge Granville Renmark	4 episodes
2015	Maximum Choppage	Barry St Clair	1 episode
2015	Redfern Now: Promise Me	Snr Con Browning	TV movie
2016	Frieda and Diego	Diego Rivera	
2016	Love Child	Henry Bowditch	2 episodes
2017	The Comet Kids	Rodney	
2018	Home and Away	Kurt Adams	6 episodes
2018	Stinson Creek	Principal Harding	3 episodes
2018	The Flip Side	The Mechanic	TV movie
2018	Book Week	Principal Gilroy	
2019	Smoke Between Trees	Matthews	
2019	Mr Inbetween	Kim	1 episode
2020	The Legend of the Five	Marduck	
2020	Operation Buffalo	Hugh Blackett	1 episode
2021	This Little Love of Mine	Mr Bailey	
2023	NCIS: Sydney	Theo Blainey	
2023	The Appleton Ladies' Potato Race	Bob Bunyan	TV movie
2025	The Twelve	Philip Lee	1 episode

== Theatre ==
Year	Title	Role	Notes
1981	Exiles	Black Cowboy	Anthill Theatre, Melbourne
1982	The Condemned of Altona	Franz	Anthill Theatre, Melbourne
	Make Me Smile	Lead role	Comedy Theatre, Melbourne
1994	5 A Season of Plays: The Sun, The Moon and the Stars	Interrogator	Carlton Courthouse, Melbourne with Wintercourt Productions
1995	Scenes from a Separation	Darcy Molyneux	Fairfax Studio, Melbourne with MTC
1996	The Rover	Frederick	Playhouse, Melbourne with MTC
2002	Hanging Man	Scott	Wharf Theatre, Sydney with STC
2003	Black Milk	Mishunya	Belvoir St Theatre, Sydney with Splinter Theatre Company
2004	In Our Name		Belvoir St Theatre, Sydney
2004	Ladybird		Belvoir St Theatre, Sydney
	The Westlands	The Mayor	Weatherboard Theatre Company
