= Trudy Hellier =

Australian film director

- Occupations: Actress, director, screenwriter
- Awards: Australia Film Institute Award for Best Screenplay

Trudy Hellier is an Australian actress, director and screenwriter with many television credits to her name.

== Selected credits ==
She was a featured in the Australian television programs Round the Twist as school teacher and love interest Fay James, and Frontline as segment producer Kate Preston. She appeared on Blue Heelers, The Games, Neighbours, The Secret Life of Us, Guinevere Jones, State Coroner, Law of the Land and Driven Crazy.

On stage she appeared in Working Out (George Fairfax Studio, 1991), Mrs Warren's Profession (Newton Actors Group Studio Theatre, 1991), Skin (The Top of the Town, 1995), Trapped (playing as part of Poles Apart, La Mama, 1996) and Crave (Fringe Festival, The Parkview Hotel, 2000).

As a director she created the short film Trapped (2000).

In 2011 she appeared as Deb in the touring production of Furiously Fertile. In addition to her acting, Hellier has also written and directed in the Australian TV and film industries. She won the Australian Film Institute Award for Best Screenplay in a Short Fiction Film for Break & Enter in 1999.
