= Jane Kennedy (actress) =

Australian actress

- Born: Jane Louise Kennedy; 9 June 1964 (age 62); Melbourne, Australia
- Education: Genazzano FCJ College, RMIT University
- Occupations: Actress; producer; writer; director
- Spouse: Rob Sitch
- Children: 5

Jane Kennedy (born 9 June 1964) is an Australian actress, radio presenter and television producer, best known for her work with Working Dog Productions, a group of performers responsible for a variety of television and films. She previously was a co-host of KennedyMolloy on Triple M with Mick Molloy.

== Career ==
She met the other members of the group, which over time included Tom Gleisner, Rob Sitch, Santo Cilauro, Tony Martin, Mick Molloy, and Jason Stephens, while working on Melbourne commercial radio on the D-Generation Breakfast Show. Kennedy was not originally a member of the group, but was the newsreader assigned to work with them during their timeslot. The team quickly made a game of trying to make her laugh while she read the news. Their frequent success led to Kennedy joining the D-Generation as a full-time member and she continued to work with them on the radio show. The group stayed together to later write, direct and produce The Late Show, a comedy sketch show, Frontline, a widely acclaimed spoof of television current affairs in which she played ambitious reporter Brooke Vandenberg, and Funky Squad, a retro styled spoof of 70s police dramas.

Since the mid-1990s, Kennedy has mostly stayed behind the camera as a casting director and producer for various Working Dog productions, including their panel talk show The Panel, and the films The Castle and The Dish.

Kennedy also appeared on the radio program Get This occasionally, and has been a semi-regular panelist on television chat show The Circle.

In 2009, Kennedy released her first cookbook, Fabulous Food Minus the Boombah. In 2010, she released her second cookbook, OMG! I Can Eat That? and has since written two other cookbooks One Dish Two Ways and The Big Book of Fabulous Food.

From 2017 until 2020 she co-hosted Kennedy Molloy, a national drive show on Triple M in 2018 with her long time comedy colleague Mick Molloy. In January 2021, Kennedy resigned from Triple M to devote more time to her family.

=== Films ===
Year	Production	Credited as				
Year	Production	Director	Producer	Writer	Actor	Other
2012	Any Questions for Ben?					Casting Director
2003	Bad Eggs				Yes	Role: Parliament House Tour Guide (voice only)
2000	The Dish		Yes	Yes		Casting Director, Music Producer
1997	The Castle			Yes		Casting Director, Music Supervisor

=== Television ===
Year	Production	Credited as				
Year	Production	Director	Producer	Writer	Actor	Other
2013–present	Have You Been Paying Attention?				Yes	Role: Panellist & Fill-in Quiz Master
2011	Statesmen of Comedy				Yes	Role: Herself
2009	Thank God You're Here					Casting Director, Thanks
2008	The Hollowmen					Casting Director
2004	Russell Coight's Celebrity Challenge					Casting Director
1998–2007	The Panel		Yes		Yes	Role: Herself
1995	Funky Squad	Yes	Yes	Yes	Yes	Role: Cassie
1994–1997	Frontline	Yes	Yes	Yes	Yes	Role: Brooke Vandenberg
1993	The Olden Days				Yes	Role: Caroline Chisholm (voice only)
1993	Bargearse				Yes	Role: Natalie Thigh-Blaster (voice only)
1992–1993	The Late Show	Yes	Yes	Yes	Yes	Role: Various characters

== Personal life ==
Kennedy was born in the Melbourne suburb of Camberwell. Kennedy was educated at Genazzano FCJ College, in Kew, an inner suburb of Melbourne. She and her husband Rob Sitch have five children and live in Melbourne.
