= Frontline (Australian TV series) =

Australian comedy television series

- Genre: Comedy/satire
- Starring: Rob Sitch; Jane Kennedy; Alison Whyte; Tiriel Mora; Bruno Lawrence; Kevin J. Wilson; Steve Bisley
- Country of origin: Australia
- Original language: English
- No. of series: 3
- No. of episodes: 39 (list of episodes)

Production
- Running time: 19–26 minutes
- Production company: Working Dog Productions

Original release
- Network: ABC TV
- Release: 9 May 1994 – 19 May 1997

Frontline is an Australian comedy television series which satirised Australian television current affairs programs and reporting. It ran for three series of 13 half-hour episodes and was broadcast on ABC TV in 1994, 1995 and 1997.

== Production ==
The series was written, directed and produced by Jane Kennedy, Santo Cilauro, Rob Sitch and Tom Gleisner. Cilauro, Sitch and Gleisner had created and performed in Melbourne University Revues 1983-1985. The four had created and performed in the television shows The D-Generation and The Late Show before creating Frontline, then Funky Squad, between series 1 and 2 of Frontline.

After Frontline they moved into feature films, making several popular Australian movies including The Castle and The Dish, and hosted The Panel for several years, before moving on to Thank God You're Here and later Have You Been Paying Attention?.

The series was partly inspired by a 60 Minutes special "Has the media gone too far?". It bears some similarity to the UK series Drop the Dead Donkey.

Behind the Frontline was a 1995 behind-the-scenes featurette by John Tabbagh, documenting the production.

== Setting ==
=== A commercial network ===
The series follows the fortunes of a fictional current affairs show, Frontline. In the show, Frontline competes directly with Nine's A Current Affair and Seven's Real Life, which changed its name to Today Tonight from 1995 onwards.

The series satririzes the operations of a current affairs television programme, focusing on the interactions between producers, presenter, reporters and production staff. Storylines frequently examine the pursuit of ratings, journalistic ethics, and media practices, including the use of hidden cameras, aggressive interviewing techniques, and chequebook journalism. The programme also explores the influence of network executives and the contrasting roles of on-air personalities and behind-the-scenes staff in television productions.

The station itself also runs other television shows referenced by Frontline staff, such as 6 o'clock news program, a 3-hour news review show Sunday Forum, a sketch show The Komedy Bunch, a game show Jackpot, a teen soap opera Sunshine Cove which later changed to Rainbow Island, also lesser mentioned shows such as the football show Ball-to-Ball, Late-Night OZ, Cartoon Crazies, The Morning Show, Face the Press and Vacation.

=== As a commentary ===
The characters and situations were often thinly-disguised parodies of recent real events and real people, giving the show's comedy a black edge. In particular, the Season 1 episode "The Siege" was a replay of a controversial real life incident which had occurred just a few months earlier, told as though Frontline itself had covered the story.

The dim-witted, egotistical host Mike Moore was a parody of current television hosts and journalists. Sitch has claimed that none of the characters were directly based on a single person, and indeed the character of Moore was a combination of well-known characteristics of a number of high-profile television figures, including A Current Affair host Ray Martin, Martin's predecessor Mike Willesee, and Real Life host Stan Grant.

The ABC's media review show Media Watch was featured prominently. Much of the real life journalistic misconduct reported on Media Watch later appeared on Frontline in fictionalised form. One example of this was when Media Watch reported that Dave "Sluggo" Richardson had made a highly misleading report on Christopher Skase for Today Tonight. Richardson was suspended from duty for a month, and in the "One Rule for One" episode of Frontline, fictional reporter Martin di Stasio is suspended for a month for doing exactly the same thing.

Multiple episodes of Frontline featured Media Watch segments criticising the show.

== Episodes ==
Series	Episodes	Originally released	
Series	Episodes	First released	Last released
1	13	9 May 1994	1 August 1994
2	13	24 July 1995	16 October 1995
3	13	24 February 1997	19 May 1997

== Characters ==
=== Reporters ===
- Mike Moore (Rob Sitch) is the anchor of Frontline. He is self-centred and dim-witted, but his intentions are generally noble. Mike is very protective of what he calls his "journalistic integrity" and resents any insinuation that he is a lightweight. He believes that he is on the cutting edge of journalism, but is oblivious to most of Frontline's content, as the executive producers go to some length to keep him out of production meetings, and a running gag within the show sees Mike ignore most of the stories that Frontline airs despite his position as host. Mike is desperate for any sort of publicity he can get, but his public appearances are a constant source of amusement for the rest of the Frontline team, as they typically end in disaster. While usually harmless, Mike is not above using underhanded tactics to get his way—in "A Hole in the Heart" (series 3), he steals a story from Marty because viewers are responding positively to it, while in "Addicted to Fame", he demands that Geoffrey's television show be cancelled because he is jealous of the attention his friend is getting. In the first two series Mike's position is constantly under threat from senior reporter Brooke Vandenberg, who has a better press profile, but by the last series he has been cemented as one of the network's most valuable stars and considerably more effort is made to pander to his whims. While Mike is usually portrayed as simply dumb (for example, in "A Man of His Convictions" in series 2 he writes a letter to media commentator Stuart Littlemore full of basic spelling and grammatical errors) he occasionally surprises his colleagues with his sneakiness: in "Give 'em Enough Rope" (series 2) he traps the network owner into admitting to contravening the Broadcasting Act in a live interview, after first getting the owner to publicly commit to allowing him to ask difficult questions without threat to his job. Many gags centre around how easily he is manipulated by his executive producer, the most typical case being when Mike refuses to present a story and then is convinced to run it by an appeal to his supposed fearlessness or journalistic integrity. Mike used to work for the ABC until he was "poached" to run Frontline.
- Brooke Vandenberg (Jane Kennedy) is a reporter on Frontline. She is ambitious, amoral and publicity hungry. While there are constant rumours that she has affairs with male celebrities in order to build her profile, in some cases she simply creates the rumours herself; in "The Desert Angel" (series 1) she confesses to Pat Cash that she started a rumour about having an affair with him. Like most of the employees of Frontline, she has no ethical problems with any action the show takes to get a good story. She is, however, portrayed as being very hypocritical; in "The Invisible Man" (series 1), she has no issues with violating peoples' privacy when she runs a story using a hidden camera to catch shoplifters in a store change room, but is outraged when a rival network violates her own privacy in the same way when broadcasting a similar story. Brooke is also very vain, and tends to edit her stories to give herself as much screen time as she can manage. When a new segment producer edits footage of Brooke out of a story in "I Disease" (series 3), she becomes upset to the point where she demands that the producer be fired for it. In "A Hole in the Heart", Brooke discovers she is pregnant to a former boyfriend and is bribed into having an abortion by a new hosting offer.
- Martin "Marty" Di Stasio (Tiriel Mora) is a senior reporter on Frontline. He is Mike's major antagonist on the team, often baiting him about sensitive topics, such as the supposedly anti-Semitic golf club of which Mike is a member ("A Hole in the Heart"), or whenever Mike's public appearances end in disaster. He is the most experienced journalist on the team: a few references are made to him winning a Walkley Award. Like Brooke, he is uncritical of the show's journalistic tactics (although in the episode "Judge and Jury", he has reservations about their persecution of a priest accused of rape, mainly because he is a lapsed Catholic); in fact he is usually the confidante of the executive producers, and the one they can trust to do what is needed to get a good story, or to persuade Mike to present a story. His position on Frontline is more tenuous than that of Mike or Brooke: in "Dick on the Line" (series 3) he tells Mike and Brooke that at his age he signs his yearly contract immediately and does not mess about negotiating.

=== Producers ===
- Emma Ward (Alison Whyte) is the Line Producer on Frontline. She questions the show's practices most frequently and acts as the viewers' conscience. In "Heroes and Villains" (series 2), she is the only member of the team to have read the supposedly racist book the show is attacking and objects to their incendiary treatment of its author. Early in series 2 and 3, the executive producers of the time approach Marty and ask him to explain Emma. Marty explains that while she has moral qualms like Mike does, she is more difficult to handle because she is intelligent. Despite often objecting, Emma is usually party to ethically questionable practices and occasionally finds them amusing. In "A Hole in the Heart (part 2)", to placate a director from charity organisation Rotary, she allows the executive producer to yell at her and pretend to fire her over one of the show's decisions, when in reality she is receiving a large pay rise in return for her part of the act.
- Kate Preston (Trudy Hellier) is the segment producer. While Kate is friendly with Emma, who has a more senior position, Kate has fewer ethical qualms about stories than Emma, and tends to be in the middle of conflicts between Emma and the executive producer.
- Brian "Thommo" Thompson (Bruno Lawrence) is the executive producer during series 1. He is fired by the network in the first episode of series 2, although he is never shown on screen in that episode; the real reason for this is that Lawrence died of lung cancer between the filming of series 1 and series 2, forcing the writers to create a new executive producer character, Sam (see below).
- Sam Murphy (Kevin J. Wilson) is the executive producer during series 2, hired immediately after Brian is fired. Thommo's and Sam's characters are similar; a hard-nosed EP who would not hesitate to air questionable stories to attract ratings.
- Graham "Prowsey" Prowse (Steve Bisley) is the executive producer during series 3, hired after the producer who took Frontline to the top retires. Prowsey is much more aggressive and unpleasant than his two predecessors. He has a bad temper, is unpleasant to the staff and is unashamedly sexist: groping the female staff, dismissing bulimia as a "chick thing" and writing off Brooke's bad moods as PMS. He is, however, like his predecessors, capable of being charming when needed to deceive Mike, placate Emma or feed Brooke's ego.

=== Supporting staff ===
- Domenica Baroni (Anita Cerdic) is the office receptionist, and the only person in the office who truly admires Mike. Her increasingly bizarre hairstyles become a running gag, culminating in "Give 'em Enough Rope", when she is completely bald and festooned with ribbons. Her reactions to the show usually reflect the target audience's responses. She is a reluctant and sometimes traitorous party to the office's determination to keep Mike away from production meetings. She is always very supportive of Mike and there are often hints that she actually has a crush on him. Domenica occasionally contributes to stories run by the show, such as when she receives a tipoff from a relative in "Divide the Community, Multiply the Ratings" or when she is the only female staff member willing to go undercover in a nightclub in "My Generation".
- Shelley Cohen (Linda Ross) is the executive producer's secretary. She has worked for the network for many years and is usually unfazed by the mishaps in the office.
- Stuart "Stu" O'Hallaran (Pip Mushin) is the office's main cameraman and shoots most of Brooke's and Marty's stories. He, Marty and Jase are all friends and frequently make fun of Mike.
- Jason "Jase" Cotter (Torquil Neilson) is the sound recordist who works with Stu. Jase is not actually heard speaking until series 3 despite appearing in most episodes in series 1 and 2. He is fired in the episode "I Get the Big Names" for audio taping Brooke Vandanberg while she urinates on the toilet and then leaking it to the media.
- Hugh Tabbagh (Marcus Eyre) is the editor of videos, who is almost always seen editing in the audio-visual room whilst sitting, smoking cigarettes, coughing wildly and inhaling an asthma puffer.
- Trev (Stephen Curry) appears as Jase's replacement as the sound recordist towards the end of the third series.

=== Network employees ===
- Geoffrey Salter (Santo Cilauro) is the network's weatherman and Mike's closest friend at work. Geoff usually appears in private conversations in his office with Mike, and is often the catalyst for Mike to question the reassurance he has been given by a producer that the story of the moment is being ethically pursued. Despite his being Mike's closest friend, Mike frequently ignores Geoff's issues, and their conversations often serve to reinforce Mike's beliefs. Geoff is unpopular with the rest of the Frontline staff to the point where he is banned from the Frontline set, but they are all supportive when he unexpectedly achieves popularity with his own one-hour programme in "Addicted to Fame" (series 3), though he is unaware that Mike demanded the plans for the expansion of the show be cancelled because he was jealous of the attention Geoff was getting. He is the focus of a running gag where he will laugh hysterically along with Mike at any anecdote Mike tells him, before admitting that he does not understand it.
- Ian Farmer (Gerard Kennedy) is the Station Manager, the boss of the local studios. He appears only in series one. He and Brian Thompson are good friends, and frequently play golf together.
- Bob Caville (Peter Stratford) is the network's managing director, and definitively pulls the office into line.
- Jan Whelan (Genevieve Mooy) is the network's head of publicity in series 1 and 2. Jan refers to everyone as "poppet" and "darling" and has extravagantly camp mannerisms, but is in fact practical and efficient.
- Trish (Lynda Gibson) is the network's head of publicity in series 3. Gibson also appears in "Workin' Class Man" from series 2 as the wife/mother of three of a working-class family who is visited by Brooke for a story regarding the difficulties of making ends meet.
- Elliot Rhodes (Boris Conley) is a comedian and musician, performing short musical sketches about current events at the end of Friday night episodes of Frontline. Mike detests his act but is required to laugh uproariously and compliment it on air every week. In two episodes, he was fired at Mike's request.

=== Special guests ===
Frontline frequently featured celebrity cameos, unusually including major Australian politicians appearing as themselves, often but not always as interviewees. The most memorable appearance is that of Pauline Hanson in "The Shadow We Cast" (series 3), in which she turns her famous "please explain?" phrase on Mike. Noel Pearson appears as an interviewee later in the same episode. Other appearances include: John Hewson in "The Soufflé Rises" (series 1); Pat Cash in "The Desert Angel"; Cheryl Kernot in "We Ain't Got Dames" (series 1); Ben Elton, Bert Newton, Rosemary Margan, Amanda Keller and Anne Fulwood in "This Night of Nights" (series 1); Glenn Ridge in "Add Sex and Stir" and "Office Mole" (series 2); Glenn Robbins and Molly Meldrum in "Add Sex and Stir"; George Negus in "Add Sex and Stir" and "Dick on the Line" (series 3); and Ian Baker-Finch in "A Hole in the Heart". Harry Shearer appeared in the series 2 episode "Changing the Face of Current Affairs", where he played the character of Larry Hadges. Merv Hughes also starred in the series 2 episode "Workin' Class Man".

Other guest stars appeared in mock-ups of their own shows: Mike Moore appeared on fictitious episodes of Burke's Backyard with Don Burke, Rex Hunt's fishing show, and The AFL Footy Show with Sam Newman. Stuart Littlemore, who at the time was hosting the media commentary show Media Watch, appeared in several fictitious episodes as a critic of Frontline.

== Production strategies ==
Frontline broke new ground for Australian situation comedy, by adopting some innovative production strategies. Its rapid production schedule was inspired by UK series Drop the Dead Donkey, where each episode was written and taped in a single week and scripts were closely based on the real news stories of the preceding seven days.

The Frontline scripts were likewise written and the series filmed with a short period, often within a single week. It was a fully collaborative effort, with Cilauro, Kennedy, Gleisner and Sitch all sharing writing and directing duties, and the cast all contributing ideas during all stages of production. So sometimes when the show appeared on then-current events, it was a coincidence, as episodes were delayed by several months. In other cases there was direct commentary on real events, albeit not extremely recent ones.

To create a heightened illusion of grainy documentary realism, footage was shot under fluorescent lights in an actual office building set, and taped on hand-held Hi-8 camcorders usually operated by Gleisner and Cilauro. The footage was then transferred onto film and finally transferred back to videotape (see: Kinescope). Footage that was portrayed as being part of the Frontline broadcast (i.e., studio or field reports) was shot at broadcast quality, to increase the "realism" of the satire and complement the behind-the-scenes footage.

== Other airings ==
In 1997, Channel Seven bought the rights to the series; however, they only aired a handful of episodes. The show was perceived by management as "too close to the bone" for a network significantly focused upon its prime-time current affairs ratings battle with rival stations. The Comedy Channel has shown the series as late as 2005. It was shown again on ABC TV in 2018 and in 2020–21.

In America, Frontline was shown as either Behind the Frontline on cable or as Breaking News on PBS (which already has a news series titled Frontline).

In the UK, series 1 and 2 were shown by the Paramount Comedy Channel. Series 3, however, was never screened.

In Canada, it was aired as Behind the Frontline on Showcase in 1997.

== Impact ==
The series was extremely popular through its run, winning a Logie Award for Most Outstanding Achievement in Comedy in 1995, and a Logie for Alison Whyte as most outstanding actress in 1997. Critics often place Frontline at or near the top of lists of "the best Australian TV shows ever made".

Six episodes from series one were a core text in the Year 12 English Advanced syllabus for the Higher School Certificate in New South Wales (1999–2008) for Module C: Representation and Text: Elective 1: Telling the Truth. The episodes are "Playing the Ego Card", "Add Sex and Stir", "The Siege", "Smaller Fish to Fry", "We Ain't Got Dames", and "This Night of Nights". The show has also been used as a text response for both Years 11 and 12 in the English units of the Victorian Certificate of Education. Episodes of Frontline have been analysed for the Media topic in the Year 10 English syllabus in New South Wales since at least 2001 and in Western Australia since at least 2009.

== MentalAs campaign ==
In October 2014, Sitch reprised the role of Mike Moore and Frontline during a short sketch on the Friday Night Crack Up as part of the ABC's "MentalAs" campaign to raise money and awareness for mental health issues.

== See also ==
- Absolute Power
- The D-Generation
- The Hollowmen
- K Street
- The Newsroom
- The Thick of It
- Working Dog Productions
