= The Newsreader series 2 =

Series of television show

The Newsreader
- Series 2
- Showrunner: Michael Lucas
- Starring: Anna Torv; Sam Reid; Robert Taylor; William McInnes
- No. of episodes: 6

Release
- Original network: ABC Television
- Original release: September 10 – October 15, 2023

Series chronology
- ← Previous; Series 1 Next → Series 3

The second series of The Newsreader premiered on ABC Television on 10 September 2023. Running for six episodes, the show received the most nominations at the 2024 AACTA Awards. Again, it was primarily written by Michael Lucas and directed in its entirety by Emma Freeman.

== Background ==
Set across 1987 and 1988, the series revolves around Dale and Helen "contending with rising public profiles, intensifying office politics, and a ruthless new CEO [of the network]." The series will consist of six episodes. News events covered in the series include the 1987 federal election, the stock market crash, the separation of Prince Charles and Diana Spencer, the heroin crisis, Australia's Bicentennial celebrations and protests, and the Hoddle Street shootings. An initial trailer was released on 24 November 2022.

In February 2023, it was confirmed the series would air in the second half of the year, and in August announced that the series would premiere on 10 September. Each episode of the series will be accompanied by an official podcast, hosted by journalists Leigh Sales and Lisa Millar.

On 19 September, all remaining episodes (episodes 3–6) were made available on ABC iView, on-demand, prior to their linear broadcast.

== Cast ==
=== Main ===
- Anna Torv, as Helen Norville
- Sam Reid, as Dale Jennings
- Robert Taylor, as Geoff Walters
- William McInnes, as Lindsay Cunningham
- Marg Downey, as Evelyn Walters
- Stephen Peacocke, as Rob Rickards
- Michelle Lim Davidson, as Noelene Kim
- Chum Ehelepola, as Dennis Tibb
- Rory Fleck Byrne, as Gerry Carroll
- Daniel Gillies, as Charlie Tate
- Philippa Northeast, as Kay Walters

=== Recurring ===
- Chai Hansen, as Tim Ahern
- Caroline Lee as, Jean Pascoe
- Maria Angelico, as Cheryl Ricci
- John Leary, as Murray Gallagher
- Jackson Tozer, as Ross McGrath
- Rhys Mitchell, as Brian Mathers
- Maude Davey, as Val Jennings
- Queenie van de Zandt, as Donna Gillies
- Damian Callinan, as Frank
- Jane Harber, as Carla Carroll
- Claire Boucher, as Eliza
- Cazz Bainbridge, as Marta
- Nick Simpson-Deeks, as Paul
- Dan Spielman, as Vincent Callahan

=== Notable guests ===
- Asmara Feik, as Alison
- Em Rusciano, as Rhonda
- Hunter Page-Lochard, as Lynus Preston
- Tony Briggs, as Uncle "Owie"
- Paula Nazarski, as Aunty "Tiny"
- Paula Arundell, as Nadia
- Richard Davies, as Glen Rickards
- Nikki Shiels, as Kerrie Rickards

== Episodes ==
No. overall	No. in series	Title	Directed by	Written by	News event covered	Original release date	Consolidated viewership
7	1	"Decision '87"	Emma Freeman	Michael Lucas	1987 federal election	10 September 2023 (Note: This episode was first seen at an ACMI event in Melbourne on 8 September 2023.)	792,000
8–13 July 1987. The night is dominated by rivalries as Dale and Helen - now firmly established as 'The Golden Couple of News' - prepare to front the network's federal election coverage, frustrated by unjust pressure from their new CEO, Charlie Tate, as to what the telecast promises viewers - a 7:45pm guarantee on the election outcome - and from their erstwhile colleague and former News at Six icon, Geoff - whose career revival happens to be his own simultaneous coverage on a rival network. The Six's night goes from bad to worse when they are unable to deliver a projection on time and an opportunity to interview Paul Keating is jeopardised, as Lindsay and Dennis' toadying of Charlie becomes more desperate and Noelene gets on the wrong side of everyone bar Rob. Variety show host Gerry Carroll's addition to the panel initially annoys Dale, but he finds himself warming to the comic - to an extent that disturbs and unsettles him and Helen in different ways. Evelyn struggles to accommodate her daughter's homecoming.
8	2	"People Like You and Me"	Emma Freeman	Kim Ho	Hoddle Street massacre	17 September 2023	731,000
9–12 August 1987. A dinner at Charlie's is interrupted as news arrives of a mass shooting in Clifton Hill, an inner-city suburb of Melbourne. The only news programme with raw footage of the aftermath, the exclusive sees Lindsay approve the broadcast of unedited video including the image of a dead body. The resulting uproar taints Helen, the bulletin's newsreader, by association; being forced to confront her besmirched image - having subverted expectations of what viewers expect from a female newsreader, those disparate qualities and her departure from them made clear - worsened by Geoff, who launches a caustic attack on the exploitative tactics of modern media, aided by Evelyn's underhand tactics in extracting insider information from Cheryl. With his and Noelene's homes located near the massacre, Rob struggles to gather himself in the following days, compounding the pair's reluctance to reveal their relationship. Charlie begins to inveigle himself into the Six's affairs with a baulking effect; Lindsay in his crosshairs.
9	3	"Greed and Fear"	Emma Freeman	Michael Lucas	Black Monday	24 September 2023 (Note: Episodes 3–6 were made available on ABC iView on 19 September 2023, prior to their respective linear broadcasts.)	615,000
17–20 October 1987. Helen is deeply perturbed when a notorious newspaper gossip columnist calls, promising a tell-all feature about her troubled past, including her estrangement from her family and institutionalisation as a teenager. Dale and Helen take different routes and inspiration in attempting to deal with the situation; Gerry encourages Dale to concede to the columnist's power, which results in a mistimed proposal. Helen, meanwhile, takes the direct route in attempting to rope CEO Charlie into quashing the story - who is preoccupied with trying to stem his losses from the stock market catastrophe - with a visit to Evelyn's to lay the blame at her door worsening the image the story will create of her. The pair both find themselves at potential sources of temptation to repair and secure their future. The shifting deckchairs and unstable manoeuvres at the Six unsettles Dennis, whose secret plotting to overthrow Lindsay steps up a notch. Geoff continues to be blind - with reluctant self-admission to otherwise - to the truth behind Kay's increasingly obvious suffering, while Noelene's efforts to improve her professional standing fall short, to her dismay.
10	4	"The Hungry Truth"	Emma Freeman	Adrian Russell Wills	Bicentennial protests / Diana/Charles 'separation'	1 October 2023	540,000
4–16 December 1987. With the Bicentennial celebrations approaching, the network's preparations are beginning to warm up; when Geoff's coverage is unexpectedly interrupted by a brash, suave activist group leader - Lynus Preston, determined to get his message across on the suffering of the Aborigines and how the celebrations will worsen it - Helen is keen to obtain a narrative-challenging interview. Lindsay's opposition is quelled by Dale and Noelene's revelation they have a ratings-rocketing story on the state of Prince Charles and Diana's marriage, and in return Helen and Lynus get their spot - although he is more-than-happy to string her along, Helen already unsettled by the reappearance of Tim with another interested crew. Inspired by her erstwhile enthusiasm and happiness, Dale resolves to prepare another surprise and spectacle of his own: a lavish, yet low-key, proposal; his efforts, however, are undermined by unneeded blowback on the royal story from different directions - that end up upsetting both Helen and Lynus for very contrasting reasons. Kay is left broken by her parents' reaction to their inclusion in her recovery - a dismissive, blasé Evelyn and obstinate Geoff refusing to acknowledge their part in her years-long pain - while Noelene is disappointed by Rob's facetious takes on racism.
11	5	"A Model Daughter"	Emma Freeman	Niki Aken	Heroin crisis	8 October 2023	524,000
17–21 December 1987. Carrying on as normal proves increasingly fraught for Dale and Helen, their close working relationship hiding how emotionally and romantically distant they are. Their impasse is punctuated by Kay's request for a tell-all interview on her addiction and her family's involvement - enthusing Lindsay, wanting a huge scoop to end the year on, but prompting an eruptive Geoff. Jealousy causes Dale's grasp on his relationship to crumble further, as drowning his spirits at the camera crew's infamously ribald Christmas party - a surprise appearance by Tim and Gerry encouraging him to follow them on to an underground gay bar - dismantles any obstacle to loosening his self-imposed shackles, shocking them both as he becomes incongruously uninhibited. Noelene's apprehension over impressing Rob's family at a Christmas lunch worsens as Kay calls, demanding the interview be held immediately; her forthright answers resonate with both her and Helen, while a hungover Dale nurses the night before by reasserting himself as the caricature of the unflawed man - which includes agreeing with critique of the lack of sensationalism in Helen's report... compounding her already tentative thoughts on her regret as to her drifting moral compass, and leading to a staggering decision matching Dale's impulsiveness.
12	6	"Fireworks"	Emma Freeman	Michael Lucas	Australian Bicentenary	15 October 2023	513,000
21–27 January 1988. The Six team all encounter threats to their future with constantly fluctuating levels of hope, ambition, and danger. Dale and Helen start their lives apart, their ostensibly buoyant moods immediately upended; Gerry pleads with Dale for support after his arrest for cottaging, and Helen is informed tenacious newspaper columnist Donna has learned of Dale's tryst with Tim. Rushing to protect him, she demolishes her relationship with Charlie, and becomes crestfallen after her newfound sense of freedom as Seven News' US election correspondent is shattered by Lindsay's malicious gossip about her tendency for caprice. Dale attempts to fight Gerry being excised from their coverage of Australia Day - the First Fleet re-enactment and a royal visit converging to engender the biggest news day of the year, helped by Geoff stepping away from his show in light of family turmoil - but in desperation to save himself, and his position, reneges on his loyalty to someone who is also hiding who they are, inspiration striking last-minute to secure his potential for good. Noelene is wracked with indecision after an offer to join Helen abroad is compounded when Rob unexpectedly proposes and she begins to wonder about her place in the world as the path forward bifurcates, with Dennis also finding himself in a relatable position.

== Supplementary podcast ==
No.	Podcast title / episode reviewed	Original release date	Length
—	"INTRODUCING —The Newsreader Podcast with Leigh Sales and Lisa Millar"	8 August 2023	3m 01s
1	"01 | Decision '87 with Michael Lucas and Emma Freeman"	10 September 2023	42m 21s
Guests: Antony Green (ABC News election analyst), Emma Freeman, Michael Lucas
2	"02 | People Like You and Me with Anna Torv"	17 September 2023	33m 15s
Guests: Steve Carey (Seven News reporter at the time, reported from scene of Hoddle Street massacre), Anna Torv
3	"03 | Greed and Fear with Marg Downey"	19 September 2023	34m 41s
Guests: Marg Downey, Zed Dragojlovich (costume designer)
4	"04 | The Hungry Truth with Adrian Russell Wills"	19 September 2023	31m 51s
Guests: Adrian Russell Wills (episode writer), John Logue (hair and make-up artist), Sue Hollins
5	"05 | A Model Daughter with William McInnes and Michelle Lim Davidson"	20 September 2023	33m 24s
Guests: William McInnes and Michelle Lim Davidson
6	"06 | Fireworks with Sam Reid and Michael Lucas"	21 September 2023	45m 21s
Guests: Sam Reid, Michael Lucas

== Release ==
On 9 August 2023, it was confirmed that the second series would premiere on Sunday 10 September 2023, at 8:30pm. Episodes for this series were also accompanied by the official The Newsreader Podcast, made available online following each episode; hosted by Leigh Sales and Lisa Millar, they were teased as to feature insights into the actual lives of journalists working in newsrooms in the 1980s, as well as 'never-before-heard stories from the writers room', cast interviews and 'gossip from the set'.

Both Torv and Reid were given clearance to promote the series during the various actors' and writers' strikes in the United States happening at the time. On 8 September 2023, the first episode of the series premiered at an event at the Australian Centre for the Moving Image (ACMI) in Melbourne, co-hosted by ABC, and was followed by a Q&A session with cast and crew, namely creator Lucas, director Freeman, producer Warner, Anna Torv, Sam Reid and Marg Downey. It was helmed by ABC anchor Lisa Millar. A short excerpt from the first episode of the series was made available on YouTube several hours before broadcast.

On 19 September 2023, all episodes yet to air (episodes 3–6) were made available on ABC iView, on-demand, prior to their linear broadcast.

The second series premiered on the Eden channel in New Zealand on 13 September 2023, with episodes broadcast weekly. In Ireland, the series also began airing on 13 September, with episodes broadcast weekly on RTÉ2 and made available after on RTÉ Player.

In August 2023, it was announced that the second series would be shown in the United Kingdom on BBC Two, and simultaneously made available on BBC iPlayer, in late autumn. In October, it was confirmed the series would premiere on 9 November - with new episodes being shown at 9pm on Thursdays and Fridays over three weeks - while the full series was made available on iPlayer from that date prior to broadcast.

The second series premiered in Latin America on Universal Plus on 6 November, on Viaplay internationally on 15 November, and began airing in Spain on Canal COSMO on 20 November.

== Production ==
On 30 March 2022, the ABC confirmed that The Newsreader had been renewed for a second series, to be set in 1987. The second season aired on 10 September 2023, with a third season announced on 25 September 2023.

=== Casting and characterisation ===
Alongside the confirmation of the series' renewal, it was revealed Daniel Gillies and Philippa Northeast had joined the cast. In July 2022, creator Lucas advertised on Twitter and Instagram for potential extras for a gay bar scene set to shoot in Melbourne in late August. Another casting call was made in July, for First Nations extras "to help recreate the 1988 Bicentennial Protests that were based in Fremantle and Sydney", suggesting series 2 will cover events in 1988.

A trailer was released in late November 2022, which also revealed that Rory Fleck Byrne would guest-star this series, as a variety show host. There will also be a further expansion of the cast with an introduction to extended family members of the main ensemble. On 9 August 2023, alongside the announcement of the premiere date of the series and the release of a more lengthy trailer, it was revealed what roles the new members of the supporting cast would play: Gillies as the new network CEO, Northeast as Geoff and Evelyn's 'complex' daughter Kay, Fleck Byrne as 'superstar variety host' Gerry, and the previously unannounced addition of Hunter Page-Lochard to the series' supporting cast as 'firebrand activist' Lynus. It was also confirmed that the entire ensemble from the first series would be returning. In the fifth episode of The Newsreader Podcast, Leigh Sales clarified that the reduced appearance of Chai Hansen as Tim Ahern in the second series was due to Hansen being "in very high demand overseas"; the character was on the verge of being completely written out of the series, but Hansen's enthusiasm for taking part in the show meant he made the effort to find time to appear. Lim Davidson stressed the importance of the entire ensemble returning, and how she felt "comfortable because we were heading back in together and it was pretty much the same team and we'd all got along so well", yet simultaneously "nervous with the responsibility of playing Noelene again and hoping that I could get her through season two the best way I can as an actor".

In an interview with TVTonight, Lucas remarked positively regarding the character of Jerry being Irish, stating that what he perceived as the tradition of variety show hosts being expats meant "something felt right about him coming from Ireland". He also commented on another character introduced in the second series, protest leader Lynus; while fictional, he is "heavily based on real figures behind" the Bicentennial protests at the time. The writer of the fourth episode, Adrian Russell Wills, in which Lynus features said the character was largely based on his brother, Albert, who was a grassroots Aboriginal activist who he described as "that black fella that was ... on the front of the march and protesting", with whom he used to have "a lot of conversations around all of the issues that you see in the show and the episode".

The opening to the fourth episode features a scene in which several characters from the News at Six shoot a musical ending to a network promo; Em Rusciano, close friend of - and podcast co-host with - Lucas, played a character named Rhonda who sang the lyrics to the accompanying tune. Several current Australian TV journalists also made cameos during the scene, namely ABC meteorologist Nate Byrne, Network 10 reporter Daniel Doody, and radio sports commentator Megan Hustwaite. This promo was shot in one morning, with the scenes from the fifth episode in which Dale, Gerry, and Tim visit a gay club being filmed early that afternoon.

In September 2023, on Twitter, Lucas revealed that Helen's birth name, as revealed in the third episode - Helen Kaasik - was "her father's Estonian surname, but she took her mother's maiden name of Norville because it was more palatable to Australian TV audiences of the '80s".

=== Cast improvisation ===
The cast spoke frequently about the level of improvisation and melding of their own personal lives into their characters' that took place during the second series. Lim Davidson said that improvising or suggesting script changes or additions is only done when they believe "we think it can progress the story", and by the second series the cast were trusted to "know who these characters are [and] will only add things" such as dialogue from interactions from their real lives or "personal details that we think help support the story". McInnes said his character's proclivity for yelling stems from his upbringing, when many of his male role models were typical yellers. When asked how she responds as an actor to McInnes' character's "outbursts", she said Noelene was "caught in [the] dynamic" of being one of the lower-status members of the News at Six "core team". As an actor, she said her role is to "just be in the scene [and] listen to that response and I automatically respond that way" - trying to ensure any responses are "completely natural" and not "manufactured" - recalling a scene in the first episode where she shocked herself with the emotional depth she gave a response, attributing it to being "so in the zone that it feels very real". Lim Davidson reflected that she related to her character's position as the "most junior person in the workplace" - described by journalist Leigh Sales as being in that position as "constant[ly] trying to the right thing and to avoid being the target of that" - as she "feel[s] very alert to everything" on set, and that if she has a potential idea or solution for a story "it all needs to be really like at the tip of my fingers"; she hoped "that translates to ... that genuine kind of quality of ... her being a junior member of the office and having to over deliver in those high anxiety moments". She also related to Noelene in a scene in which Rob's family members engage in casual racism by conflating Chinese, Japanese and Korean people together, having experienced that personally too.

Downey disclosed that the scene in the third episode in which the character of Helen arrives at Evelyn's door to deliver a profanity-laced diatribe about the state of the latter's character and morals was improvised by Torv, comparing it to her own approach as an actor being "very script-bound", while she praised Torv's ability to improve, "feeling it in the moment, [and] changing the script", and so it was "a matter of kind of going with that". She found the experience "a little bit nerve-wracking, but it really worked because I didn't know what was going to appear at that door". Downey found it "quite confronting" to open the scene with Torv, as Helen, calling her character a "fucking bitch", taken aback by how it was not in the script nor the opening line; the script detailed that "Dale attempted to mediate before Helen erupted", but "on the day, Anna felt Helen would erupt the second she laid eyes on Evelyn". Downey spoke of finding humour in the situation, as both Torv's and Downey's characters had had little interaction throughout the entirety of the show's production, and so neither had themselves personally - and that it was their characters' first interaction since a scene in the first series that was also driven by distaste for each other. In fact, it was the first scene Torv shot for the second series.

While in general McInnes is against investing too much time, effort and thought into creating possible histories for his character, he did suggest the backstory, revealed in the fifth episode, that his character was the godfather of Robert Taylor's character, Geoff's, daughter. McInnes suggested this to Lucas, who in turn informed Taylor, who inserted it into the scene. Lucas added that while Torv and Reid were "both prone to ... saying a lot less because they prefer to just convey it without the dialogue", a scene with McInnes "grows so much with all these references" to pop culture of the time or perverse quips he ad-libs, describing the actor as "incredibly vivid" and his performances on set as being akin to an "event". Writer Russell Wills disclosed that - as well as having known Lynus' actor Hunter-Page since he was a young child - a scene in the fourth episode in which the characters of Lynus and Helen dance was improvised, but credited the script with fomenting the potential for it to happen; "the dancing, and the moving and offering, we call it, from Hunter to Anna" and that "the safety and trust that they have of each other, as actors, I think allowed for a moment of brevity ... you can't write that stuff [and] those moments; that's the truth". He said their previously having worked together - on Fires - ensured they had "great rapport together".

The scene in the second episode where the Carrolls perform a song together at the piano was "concocted in a burst of joy" when Fleck Byrne and Jane Harber met for the first time at rehearsals. This was not included in scripts and deliberately kept secret by Freeman from Torv and Reid, "so their reactions were priceless". Freeman was remarked as having "gave the cast space to improvise the Christmas party dancing and revelry" in the fifth episode; filming for the Christmas party scenes took nine hours and were held on the last day of filming for Chai Hansen.

=== Writing ===
Lucas said that, as with the first series, events were chosen and placed throughout the series according to whether they were grounded by certain dates or not - "a balance of really date-specific things with a couple of broader arc '80s news stories". An episode on the heroin crisis, for example, was able to be placed anywhere within the series, Lucas commenting that he had "a little bit of leeway to put that story at an appropriate time for our cast of characters". Additionally, the nascence of current affairs shows and TV journalists "becom[ing] brands themselves" at the time is explored in the second series, with the character of Geoff hosting his own eponymous current affairs show a deliberate attempt at this, with Lucas and producer Werner having read several memoirs of journalists from the era.

Lucas recalled that figures who had previously worked in the industry during the temporal setting of the series had written into the production company in light of the first series to "directly ask" if characters were based on them. He found that when naming characters he was unable to clear certain names if they were the same as real-life figures at the time; he wanted to name Charlie Tate 'Warwick' - calling it "such a great '80s name" - but it "would clash" with Warwick Fairfax. With naming the character of Lindsay, "three or four names" had been gone through beforehand, as it would be a likeness not many "would take kindly to" had they happened to share a forename.

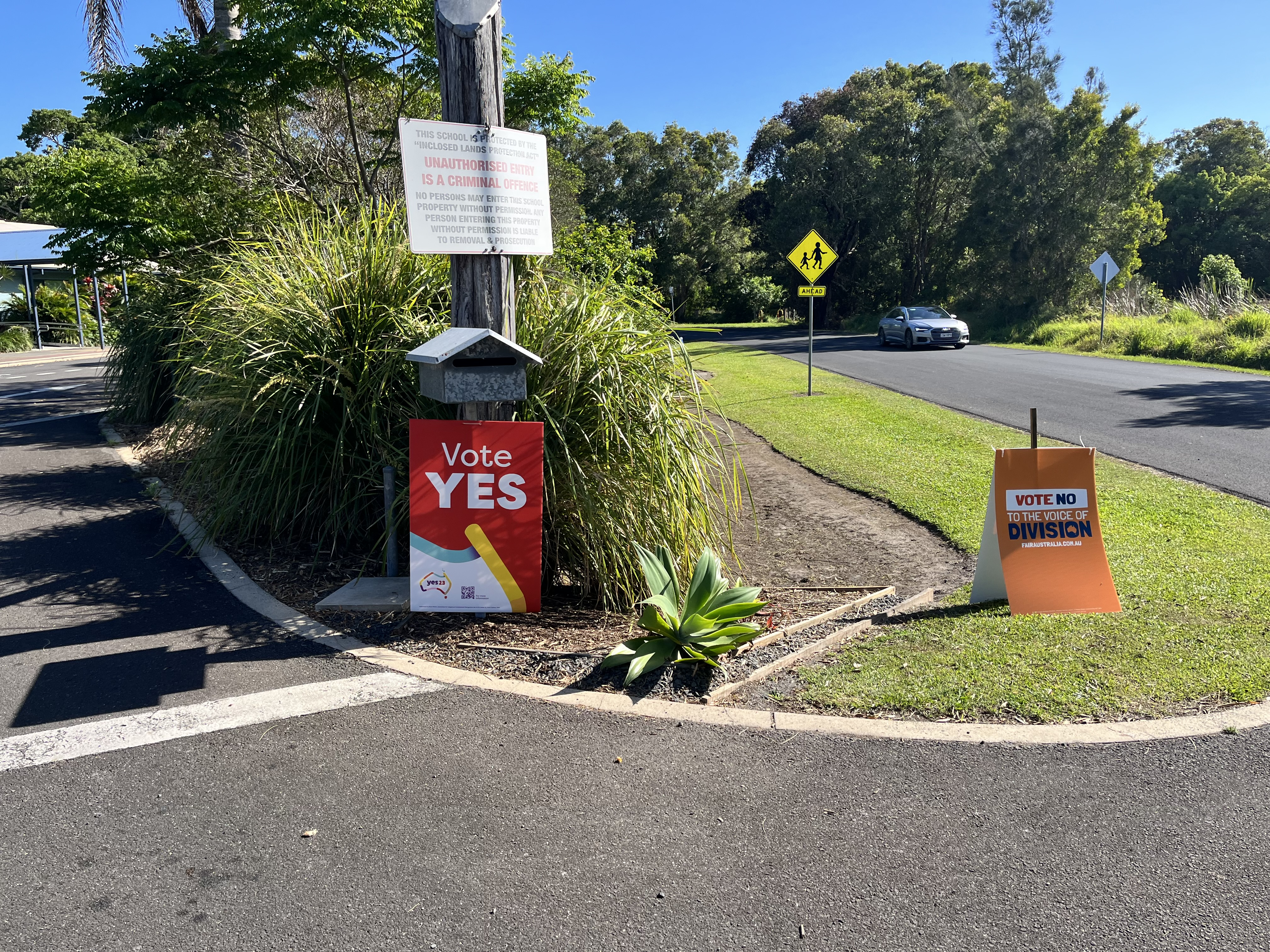
Lawn signs outside a polling station for the October 2023 constitutional referendum on establishing a Voice to Parliament for Australia's Aboriginal and Torres Strait Islander population. Lucas remarked on how the fourth episode - which centres on the debate about recognition of Australia's original inhabitants during the country's celebration of the 200th anniversary of the first British settlers landing, and the media treatment of protests and views that run against such a buoyant mood - happened to have aired during the campaign period.

Russell Wills, in discussing his brother being the inspiration for the character of Lynus, identified parallels with their, on the surface, divergent methods of fighting for further Aboriginal recognition and rights; "while he's at the front of the protest, marching and calling and yelling for with passion and anger and fervor, ... the way that I do my marching is through writing and to be able to put it into an episode like this on a show that has such a fantastic following", describing it as what he calls, and "do[es] a lot in [his work]", "the Trojan Horse". Russell Wills spoke of Lynus as "embod[ying] a passion and hope and optimism and possibility", while Helen "is one of those characters and voices that ... are really important and were really important to any advancement that Aboriginal people have had in this country politically". The scene in which Helen cuts Lynus off and advises him on speaking in less of a 'diatribe' and in a way that more relates to the audience that she knows he has the skills to do, represents the "dichotomy" of Russell Wills' brother that he "tried to bring through Lynus"; "the anger and the passion can often turn people off or make people switch off ... and what Helen does, or hopes that she does, is appeal to him to engage the audience on a different level ... through relatability ... and finding a way of telling us ... how it feels [to be Aboriginal]". Russell Wills considered this a "unique" way of framing things "often not allowed in the media". He wished that the audience of The Newsreader are "able to relate to Lynus as if he was a member of their own family", as he unexpectedly found indigenous and Aboriginal characters on Redfern Now, which he had previously worked on, had done so with a white audience. Lucas spoke of the coincidence that the episode aired concurrent to the campaign period for the ultimately unsuccessful referendum on establishing further rights for indigenous Australians in the constitution, polling day for which was held the day before the series' final episode was broadcast.

When asked about why the character of Dennis - from an ethnic minority background - was shown as not inclined to feature the Bicentennial from an indigenous perspective in the episode, Russell Wills said Dennis is "constantly in service of the audience and the ratings and the business of the show", and it "doesn't matter about colour or creed", with Dennis "there to service the audience, the statistics to service his jobs" and it is "not about making it personal". He praised Lucas, who he said had "drawn that character so beautifully from the beginning, from the inception of the show and ... the casting", and that Dennis "gives us a constant insight into what it takes to be a leader of a newsroom like that and the decisions you have to make". He agreed with a suggestion Dennis is simply delivering what "Lindsay wants". Lucas commented Russell Wills' 2014 documentary 88 on the Bicentennial protests was an "invaluable resource" for production of the fourth episode.

=== Production and filming ===
In September 2021, before the first series was broadcast, when speaking about the prospect of a second series, Lucas claimed that he wanted to have sourced the required archive footage before starting writing, and how the ABC's archives team had been proactive in doing this so he was already "sitting on a goldmine", and "brainstorming ideas [to be] ready when the time comes". Lucas later revealed that development of the second series was commissioned by the ABC prior to the broadcast of the first, which gave him "time to imagine what I wanted and what the team wanted without knowing how people were going to respond", which he found "liberating" in that "you know who you're writing for", and he had the "ensemble's voices in [his] head".

Lucas recalled a humorous moment from the series' table-reads early in production, with the cast approving so much of Marg Downey's convincing portrayal of Evelyn that "everyone sitting around kind of burst out laughing [as] it was so exciting to finally hear that character speak in that tone again". Sam Reid spoke of how Lucas and Freeman devised a booklet that was given to cast members at the start of production of the second series, which outlined and detailed the events from 1987 and 1988 that would be featured in the series, to provide background to members of the cast who were not familiar with the news stories the series would cover.

"the First Nations Bicentennial protests [were] almost 36 years ago. Like a lot of white Australians I was barely even aware they happened, back in 1988, but they were enormous— probably the biggest gathering of First Nations people in history. And the energy, by all accounts, was electric. Driven by young activists like Robbie Thorpe and Tiga Bayles, and yes, Linda Burney, there was a potent feeling that a page was being turned. I ended up studying them for The Newsreader, along with many other stories of the era. Generally, digging into this archive material is an incredible way to track societal progress… to see the leaps forward in everything from gay rights, to feminism to gun control. But all the speeches made at these 88 protests could be made today. Word for word. In fact it felt like there was more optimism on that day 36 years ago. The lack of progress is staggering. I think of those young activists and how we've failed them, through a uniquely Australian combo of racism, apathy, meanness and laziness. We've shown who we are and it's shameful."

— Michael Lucas, in October 2023, about the parallels between the Bicentennial protests led by First Nation peoples, and his reaction to their failed attempts to be recognised more concretely, in the Australian Constitution, today.

Production and filming began in Melbourne in July 2022, as announced during the March 2022 announcement of the series 2 order. Filming for the second series lasted 56 days, over 11 weeks and ended in late September 2022. Location filming was prioritised and completed during the first "couple of weeks" of shooting. One of the first scenes shot during the second series featured in the sixth episode, where Dale walks into his new, empty home as a single man. Lucas recalled Freeman being inspired at that moment as to how she saw the end of the series, that it would be a "series about how Dale has to shut himself down". The eighth week of filming involved the shooting of the newsdesk studio scenes, which were done back-to-back; the preference of director Freeman "to block [them] as one sequence" like a play, with cast "perform[ing] for six minutes at a time unbroken". Filming of such scenes means that the cast often shot eight or more pages a day, with the scenes shot using "full cinematic cameras" alongside "old Betacam cameras" - a mix of vintage and new technology - so as to render the footage resembling television of the 1980s. Lucas said that it was essentially a "functional newsdesk set". The cast filmed "multiple scenes in one set after the other"; Freeman called this the "documentary approach to filmmaking", defending it by saying it offered a "style more structured and cinematic". It was this style of filming that convinced Lucas to start the series with the election being the central news story of the first episode, as "it became apparent in season one that the big, live events work well the way the director films them and everything; she runs them like a play and all this kinetic energy", and it was thought to "start with the biggest live sequence we possibly could".

The use of archive footage expanded in this series. The first episode used footage from an episode of Four Corners, specifically an interview with then-Finance Minister Paul Keating, in a way that it came across as the character of Helen was conducting the interview herself; this technique was something Lucas had previously mentioned in a pre-series interview he had hoped to utilise. Lucas said there was "a lot of deliberation", and was concerned over how Keating would react to the footage being used in such a way; Lucas said "the ultimate judgement was because it's essentially a sort of loving tribute to him, and flattering and not a distortion of what he was doing", permission from Keating to use the footage "wasn't required", and Lucas admitted that he hoped it Keating "receives it in the way it's intended". Permission had to be granted directly from Kylie Minogue to insert archival footage of her into the fifth episode.

Lim Davidson revealed that during the scene in the first episode where she is being constantly telephoned by Dennis and Lindsay, that "when we're on the phone to people, they're often not there ... it's a combination of continuity or Michael Lucas yelling from behind a wall, or, Maggie, our script coordinator". In the scene, Lindsay is meant to be "screaming" at Noelene on the phone; McInnes' scenes had been shot the previous week, "and so Michael [Lucas] was on set showing me the rushes because I had no idea the kind of ferocity that William was going to deliver those lines [and] so I could actually respond to the moments, but actually it's just Michael literally crouching behind a wall, behind the camera so he can't be seen". In the fourth episode, a scene towards the end whereby Aboriginal activists are gathered and watch the broadcast of the News at Six's patriotic promo for 1988, Lucas revealed that at that point, the preceding news bulletin nor the promo video had been shot, and so the assembled cast were reacting to him "crouched" below the camera reading the scene from the script before playing the Celebration of a Nation TV spot originally shown at the time. One of the opening scenes for the fourth episode - involving several characters shooting a network promo - was filmed on 22 August 2022; guest star Em Rusciano dated this as taking place two days prior to her address to Australia's National Press Club, which was held on 24 August. The gay club scenes in the fifth episode were filmed in The Retreat Hotel in Brunswick, Victoria, but was scripted as being Club 397, an iconic Melbourne gay nightclub of the time; the decision for this was influenced by "a lot of debate about where Gerry would take Dale", and by polls production conducted of "queer 80s clubbers". Lucas commented that dialogue in a scene in the third episode in which Dale speaks to Gerry about his sexuality was heavily influenced by Reid having "worked a great deal on both the words and the performance" both with him, Freeman and the series' intimacy coordinator Amy Cater, "to ensure Dale's expression is both truthful and period accurate".

In mid-April 2023, the final mastering session on the sixth and last episode took place, ending post-production for the second series. Lucas revealed that the original cut of the sixth episode was "about 84 minutes", having to cut it down to an hour being "one of the agonies about the series".

=== Historical accuracy ===
==== Characters ====
On the character of Noelene's salmon pantsuit, costume designer Dragojlovich said it was "our job basically to present her with ... elements of the '80s". He said "quite often we collect things in costume" that are not worn but are kept as "references" ("it might be a shoulder that we like, or it might be a lapel that we like"); Dragojlovich refers to it was "Frankenstein designing" - "piecing together one thing from another jacket and another element from another piece". Finding a look for Lim Davidson was difficult as many suits from the 1980s "looked too contemporary" with features that now look "fashionable", but eventually chose a jacket with an accompanying skirt that Lim Davidson enquired about replacing with a pant. One was chosen from another suit, it having been decided the new pantsuit should be of a colour not currently in use by any other character; Dragojlovich said that one colour a female character on the show was not wearing was pink - stating that Helen as the news presenter "gets the full colour range" but "would never ... wear pink", and he "just happened to have this sort of salmon/pink wool sitting there".

When Lim Davidson was asked about putting together such an outfit, she said it was not in the original script and was "a collaboration of ideas" between her, Freeman and Lucas over Zoom prior to shooting, and that "[w]e just wanted this idea that whatever ... advice Helen was going to give Noelene about how to be a successful woman in this time period was never going to work for Noelene". She said that "the cliche is 'fake it till you make it'", something she argued would work for a character such as Helen but not for Noelene as "she cannot change the way she actually looks ... but we wanted her to have this moment where she really believed it". Noelene "traditionally" not wearing pants meant "it felt so different to everything we've seen her in and we're used to seeing her in, and even to the colour palette in the show that we were like, 'that's it'". She described feeling "very lucky" it was custom-made; it was nicknamed 'the salmon suit', which became so legendary on set she was often called 'Salmon Lim Davidson' on the call sheet. On the 'makeover' her character received in tandem, she said "it just felt so obscure, my hair up [and] just a little bit more makeup"; she divulged that a scene cut from the episode featured her arriving home, "she realises that that's never going to work for her" and "the only way forward for her is to be her authentic self and whether people like that or not, that's all she can do", before she "had to rub my makeup off in the mirror". It was a scene she found "really confronting as an actor to do" as she "felt really sad for Noelene in that moment that ... that wasn't going to work for her and she was going to have to find another way to succeed".

==== News events and coverage ====
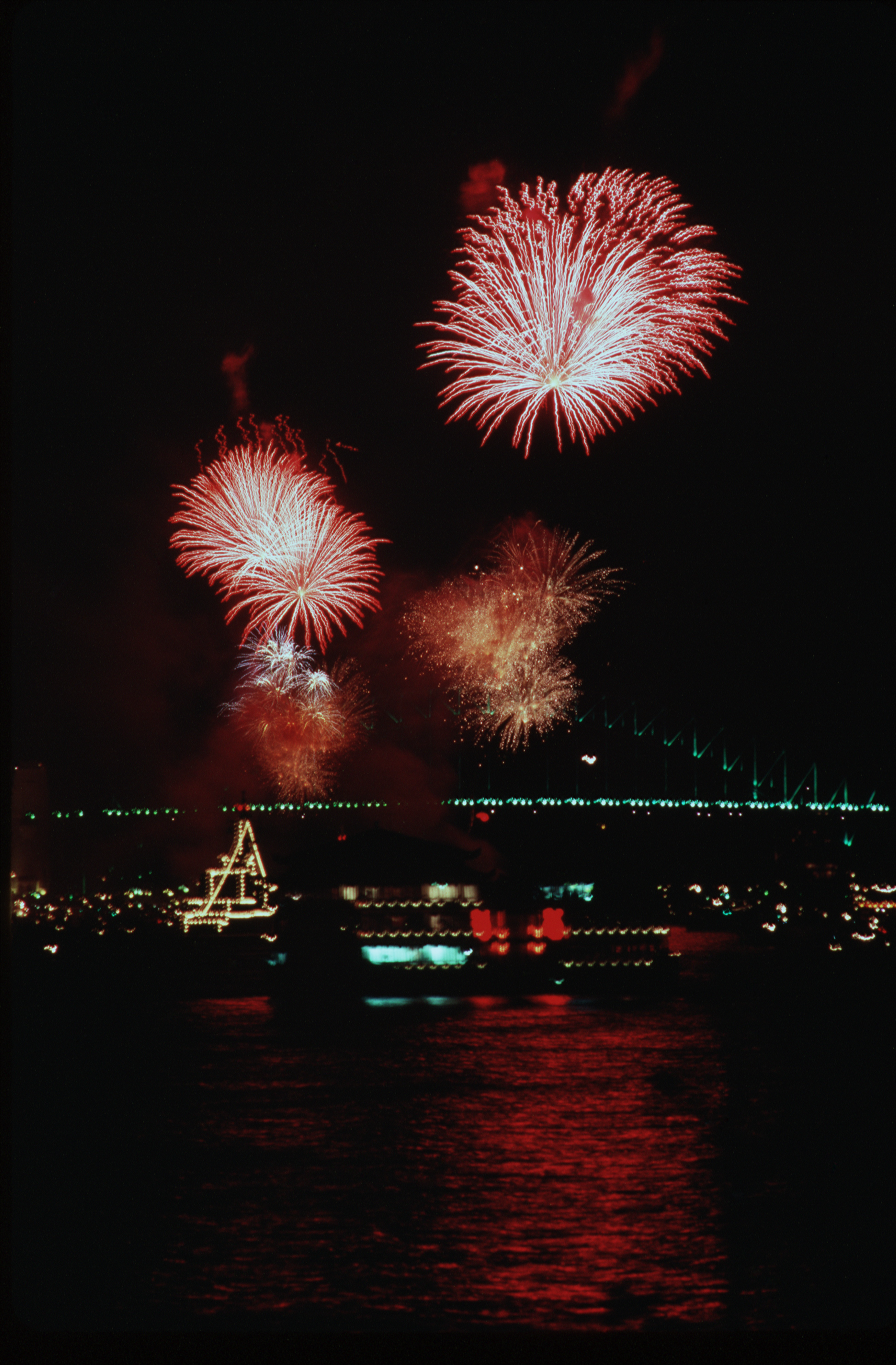
Fireworks over Sydney Harbour marking the end of Australia Day 1988, which included a re-enactment of the First Fleet sailing into the harbour. Preparations for the News at Six's coverage of the events was a pivotal narrative during the second series.

The storyline in the first episode whereby the News at Six is promising a guaranteed projection of the election results at 7:45pm is based on actual marketing from Eyewitness News during the election, the programme having promised to "deliver the result first with only 5% of the vote counted".

Matt Neal from ABC News judged the historical accuracy of the series' episodes, generally praising the series' attention to detail. Most inaccuracies he found were based on the series changing the dates of certain news events for purposes of dramatisation, such as the fourth episode featuring reports on Prince Charles and Princess Diana's royal visit to Berlin a month later than they happened in reality, the fifth containing a mention of the announcement of Frank Sinatra's long-awaited return to tour Australia three months late (the episode is set in late December 1987, with the announcement actually being made in September), and the sixth episode containing remarks on the First Fleet re-enactment leaving Botany Bay that date it doing so four days prematurely.

More significantly, the second episode contains dialogue in which Lindsay rejects Helen's suggestion of the News at Six featuring the Aboriginal and indigenous perspective on the Bicentennial by, perhaps as a mendacious excuse, saying that Ernie Dingo "was taken" and "Ernie Dingos ... don't grow on trees". Neal argues that Dingo's popularity was insufficient in 1987 - having only had "minor roles" in the media up until that point - for his status as a "high-profile indigenous celebrity", as alluded into the show, to have been attained to the point someone in Lindsay's position at the network would have suggested him as an individual that could have theoretically been used to represent said alternative look at the celebrations.

== Reception ==
=== Viewership ===
Series 2 ratings (Australia) N.B.: Episodes 3-6 were made available on-demand, on ABC iView, prior to their linear broadcasts. It is assumed on-demand viewership before their broadcasts is excluded from reported numbers.
Ep	Airdate	Metro				Total/National				Refs
Ep	Airdate	Overnights	Rank	Consolidated	Rank	Overnights (excl. BVOD) / (incl. BVOD)	Rank	Consolidated (excl. pre-TX)	Rank	Refs
1	10 September 2023	324,000	10	546,000	6	475,000 / 499,000	10 / 11	792,000	7	
2	17 September 2023	318,000	8	519,000	7	446,000 / 472,000	9 / 10	731,000	7	
3	24 September 2023	293,000	8	437,000	7	414,000 / 441,000	9 / 10	615,000	7	
4	1 October 2023	249,000	13	392,000	10	348,000 / 365,000	14 / 17	540,000	10	
5	8 October 2023	280,000	11	380,000	10	385,000 / 405,000	13 / 13	524,000	12	
6	15 October 2023	269,000	9	363,000	8	382,000 / 398,000	10 / 12	513,000	9	

In the United Kingdom, the second series premiered to 300,000 viewers, approximately half: the overnight rating for the opening episode of series 1, the average audience in the timeslot, and the first episode of Interview with the Vampire, which had been shown at the same time in previous weeks. Despite this, the concurrent launch of all episodes on BBC iPlayer saw the programme rise from being ranked 37th to 10th in the service's list of its most popular shows over the course of the day, and remained in the streaming service's top 40 most popular shows for over a week. The second episode the following day, withstanding the context of having already been made available on-demand, rose to 327,000 viewers. The entire series averaged 250,000 viewers among those who watched live or on the night. No audience figures that include catch-up viewing have yet been published.

=== Critical response ===
The review aggregator website Rotten Tomatoes reported a 100% approval rating based on 6 critic reviews.

In a four-star The Guardian review, Luke Buckmaster claims the second series "raises the stakes and ups the ante", listing that "the plotting is pointier, the performances more lived in, the conversations about media issues more pronounced and integrated in ways that feel totally germane to the drama". He praised the writers as "establish[ing] a neat format, merging Australian history with moral discussions and interpersonal dynamics", which "all comes together very smoothly and the cast are uniformly excellent"; Torv and Reid "continue to impress in the meatiest parts but the supporting cast are on point too", singling out Lim Davidson and McInnes especially. Anthony Morris wrote in a four-and-a-half star review for ScreenHub, that a "big part of what makes the show work is that it's one of the busiest Australian dramas around", yet while it "largely avoids the trap of looking down on those who had the misfortune to live in more primitive times, ... modern views still sneak through [as the] election night plot resolves itself via the very 21st century reveal that audiences, even on a massive news night, prefer their news to be entertaining"; he concluded by saying that "[t]he occasionally clunky line aside, ... The Newsreader remains a winner".

Penelope Debelle of InDaily opined that while "it is clear ... that The Newsreader is, at heart, a soap", what makes it "interesting enough to justify a second season ... is its power as a cringe-making artefact and reminder of another cultural era", pinpointing how "the series looks [to] be focusing on the more serious side of the outrageous sexism and prejudices that permeated newsroom cultures, as well as what went to air", and that "[t]he storyline is fiction but the sentiment is not, and it is still something women broadcasters contend with". In describing the ensemble as a "delight", she pinpointed McInnes' "ripe performance as the apex media boss". While concluding "[i]t would be overselling it to call it cultural history", she admitted "the framework in which the soap plays out carries enough truth to make us all thankful that, in significant ways, time has moved on". In a review of the series' final episode, Clare Ridgen of The West described the show as "deliciously watchable", and that while the second series "hasn't reached the heights of the first for me, ... Anna Torv and Sam Reid’s performances have been exceptional," and welcomed the prospects of a third series.

Sinead Stubbins of The Sydney Morning Herald - in a review of both the first and second series - proclaimed that The Newsreader was "the slick, addictive and excellent local drama that might be the best show Australia has produced in years", praising "the determination to use historical events and attitudes to illuminate something about our present" and how the show "uses ... huge world events cleverly ... they aren't just dumped in the middle of an episode", and "though there are occasional cute moments, [they] are woven into the lives of these reporters". She added that while there was "a certain safety in covering current issues through a historical lens", the show "particularly excels at when it comes to homophobia and racism in the workplace".

==== Response to accusations of anachronism over race representation ====
In 2023, The Age's Karl Quinn addressed what he deemed "a cognitive dissonance in the audience" of The Newsreader - by the show casting people of colour in roles that he saw as likely not filled, in reality, by such individuals at the time the programme is set - in an interview with Ehelepola ahead of the second series. Ehelepola praised his being cast in the role - despite admitting "if we were making a factual documentary, then you'd probably look at that position and go 'look, that wasn't the fact'" - as it "allows the show to talk to how backward we were at that time, and the fact that a person [like Dennis] wouldn't be there, not because he wasn't skilled, but because of his skin colour", and to prompt questions over what "our governments", "our boardrooms" and "our CEOs look like", both then and contemporarily. Ehelepola recalled a conversation with a Disney executive during the time he worked for the company, in which it was explained that the company featuring diversity in content they produced was not "social responsibility" but rather to engender "fantastic economics", as a show featuring an all-white cast would be difficult to attract international sales for.

Satirist Mitch McTaggart, in 2023's edition of The Last Year of Television, commented he saw "white critics pointing out a cast isn't white enough" as a "weird take", expounding that "a show made in 2023 [...] shouldn't need to be held to a subjective casting expectation of another period, real or imagined".

=== Awards ===
At the 11th AACTA Awards in 2024, the show was nominated for more awards than any other program.

Year	Award	Category	Nominee	Result	Ref
2024
2024	2024 International Emmy Awards	Best Drama Series	The Newsreader	Pending	
2024	2024 Logie Awards	Best Drama Program	The Newsreader	Nominated	
2024	2024 Logie Awards	Best Lead Actor in a Drama	Sam Reid	Nominated	
2024	2024 Logie Awards	Best Lead Actress in a Drama	Anna Torv	Nominated	
2024	2024 Logie Awards	Best Supporting Actress	Michelle Lim Davidson	Nominated	
2024	Banff World Media Festival Rockie Awards International Program Competition	Scripted - Drama Series: English Language	The Newsreader - Werner Film Productions, Australian Broadcasting Corporation, eOne	Nominated	
2024	Screen Producers Awards 2024	Drama Series Production of the Year	The Newsreader S2 – Werner Film Productions	Won	
2024	13th AACTA Awards	Best Drama Series	The Newsreader – Joanna Werner, Michael Lucas – Werner Film Productions (ABC)	Won	
2024	13th AACTA Awards	Best Lead Actor – Drama	Sam Reid	Nominated	
2024	13th AACTA Awards	Best Lead Actress – Drama	Anna Torv	Won	
2024	13th AACTA Awards	Best Supporting Actor – Drama	William McInnes	Nominated	
2024	13th AACTA Awards	Best Supporting Actor – Drama	Hunter Page-Lochard	Won	
2024	13th AACTA Awards	Best Supporting Actress – Drama	Michelle Lim Davidson	Nominated	
2024	13th AACTA Awards	Best Supporting Actress – Drama	Marg Downey	Nominated	
2024	13th AACTA Awards	Best Screenplay in Television	Adrian Russell Wills - Episode 4: The Hungry Truth	Nominated	
2024	13th AACTA Awards	Best Direction in a Drama or Comedy	Emma Freeman – Episode 4: The Hungry Truth	Won	
2024	13th AACTA Awards	Best Cinematography in Television	Earle Dresner – Episode 4: The Hungry Truth	Nominated	
2024	13th AACTA Awards	Best Editing in Television	Angie Higgins – Episode 4: The Hungry Truth	Nominated	
2024	13th AACTA Awards	Best Sound in Television	Nick Godkin, Ralph Ortner, Lee Yee, Liesl Pieterse – Episode 6: Fireworks	Nominated	
2024	13th AACTA Awards	Best Production Design in Television	Paddy Reardon - Episode 4: The Hungry Truth	Nominated	
2024	13th AACTA Awards	Best Costume Design in Television	Zed Dragojlovich – Episode 4: The Hungry Truth	Won	
2024	13th AACTA Awards	Best Casting	Nathan Lloyd	Nominated	
2024	AWGIE Awards	Best Script for Television – Series	Kim Ho – "People Like You and Me"	Nominated	
2023	Australian Directors Guild Awards	Best Direction in a TV or SVOD Drama Series Episode	Emma Freeman - The Newsreader (series 2)	Won	
2023	C21 Media International Drama Awards	Best Returning Drama Series	The Newsreader - produced by: Werner Film Productions, for: ABC Australia, distributed by: Entertainment One	Nominated	

== See also ==
- The Newsreader
- The Newsreader series 1
- The Newsreader series 3
