= The Newsreader series 1 =

Series of television show

The Newsreader
- Series 1
- Showrunner: Michael Lucas
- Starring: Anna Torv; Sam Reid; Robert Taylor; William McInnes
- No. of episodes: 6

Release
- Original network: ABC Television
- Original release: 15 August – 19 September 2021

Series chronology
- Next → Series 2

The first series of The Newsreader premiered on ABC Television on 15 August 2021. Running for six episodes, the series was ABC's most-watched drama programme of the year, and the show received the most nominations of any show or film at the 2022 AACTA Awards.

The series was created and primarily written by Michael Lucas, and directed in its entirety by Emma Freeman. Set over the first four months of 1986, it charts the burgeoning relationship between a dominant female newsreader and a young male reporter, both utilising their unusual bond to disguise aspects of themselves that would severely hinder their careers in an era where bigotry, in multiple forms such as misogyny and homophobia, were pervasive in society, and in the newsroom that reports on it.

Two further series were broadcast in 2023 and 2025.

== Cast ==
=== Main ===
- Anna Torv, as Helen Norville
- Sam Reid, as Dale Jennings
- Robert Taylor, as Geoff Walters
- William McInnes, as Lindsay Cunningham
- Marg Downey, as Evelyn Walters
- Stephen Peacocke, as Rob Rickards
- Michelle Lim Davidson, as Noelene Kim
- Chum Ehelepola, as Dennis Tibb
- Chai Hansen, as Tim Ahern

=== Recurring ===
- Caroline Lee as, Jean Pascoe
- Maria Angelico, as Cheryl Ricci
- John Leary, as Murray Gallagher
- Jackson Tozer, as Ross McGrath
- Rhys Mitchell, as Brian Mathers
- Maude Davey, as Val Jennings
- Queenie van de Zandt, as Donna Gillies
- Bert La Bonté, as Gordon
- Dom Phelan, as Brett

=== Notable guests ===
- Robert Grubb, as Dr McCormack
- Tony Rickards, as Dr Shaw
- Tim Draxl, as Adam
- Edwina Wren, as Cathy Kaasik

== Episodes ==
No. overall	No. in series	Title	Directed by	Written by	News event covered	Original release date	Consolidated viewership
1	1	"Three, Two, One..."	Emma Freeman	Michael Lucas	Challenger launch	15 August 2021	1,244,000
24–29 January 1986. Helen Norville, female co-anchor on the highly-rated News at Six, is aggrieved at feeling sidelined by boss Lindsay. After pressuring him into commissioning her special reports – disapproving of the subject matters – he enlists up-and-coming reporter Dale Jennings into supervising her – hoping to temper her ambitions – in return for allowing him his first morning update. After a row over feeling constrained, Helen walks out and is discovered by Dale at home, having attempted suicide. Spending time at his side, Helen helps Dale after a less-than-spectacular bulletin-hosting debut, encouraged by his readiness to receive her advice – spurring her on to accomplish a lauded news special the following morning after the overnight breaking news of the Challenger disaster, with Lindsay reluctant to let her go over crumbling ratings, despite the feelings of co-anchor Geoff.
2	2	"Once in a Lifetime"	Emma Freeman	Michael Lucas	Halley's Comet	22 August 2021	1,080,000
30 January–1 February 1986. The return of Halley's Comet is top of the news agenda and public milieu, while rumours about Helen and Dale's relationship dominate the newsroom gossip. Helen struggles after explosive confrontations with Lindsay and head producer Dennis, the difference between her off-camera and on-camera persona becoming ever more marked and distinguished as her already-fragile mental state worsens, to the concern of Lindsay, who is also having to deal with Geoff's deliberation over whether to resign from the network, return to the field, or remain an anchor, in the run-up to his 60th birthday bash. Dale voices his discomfort at his colleagues' slurs about his 'relationship' with Helen, and - troubled by his apparent impression of being gay - decides to take up her offer to accompany her to Geoff's party, where they become the public spectacle.
3	3	"The White Marquis Matinee Jacket"	Emma Freeman	Jonathan Gavin & Michael Lucas	Lindy Chamberlain release	29 August 2021	983,000
2–10 February 1986. The news that new evidence has been found in the Azaria Chamberlain case, that could exonerate mother Lindy Chamberlain and see her released from prison in days, rattles the newsroom; Dale and Helen are dispatched to Darwin to capture a potential ratings bonanza of an interview. Their nascent relationship comes under strain as their newsgathering styles clash, Dale's more restrained and by-the-books approach grating on Helen, whose brazen and gung-ho nature eventually does lead to a possible exclusive. Rob faces a challenge after Lindsay rosters him as relief anchor, uncomfortably expanding his remit from sport, and ropes Noelene into helping him design lines of questioning for the Chamberlain case coroner. Geoff, who spearheaded the original, extensive coverage of the case, attempts to elbow his way into the coverage; after hearing of Dale and Helen's offer of $100,000 (equivalent to $279,000 in 2021), and feeling undermined, he takes this information to a rival media outlet to ensure their efforts go to waste.
4	4	"A Step Closer to the Madness"	Emma Freeman	Niki Aken	Russell Street bombing	5 September 2021	1,032,000
27–28 March 1986. Royal wedding fever is sweeping Australia as Prince Andrew and Sarah Ferguson have announced the date for their nuptials. A frantic Helen becomes preoccupied with creating a good impression as she prepares to meet Dale's mother, and Geoff faces health issues of his own, but stubbornly refuses to adjust his unhealthy eating, drinking, and smoking habits. His resulting hospitalisation leads wife Evelyn to become concerned he'll lose status at the network, and is determined to expedite his recovery. Dale is dismayed when he's sent to supervise, rather than front, one of the many royal wedding reports, but ends up securing an unexpected headline-grabbing scoop; being first on the scene of a bombing of a police station and securing his first major appearance on the News at Six, before a bungled kiss with cameraman Tim proves traumatising. Rob makes sure Noelene knows her worth as he appreciates her assistance in securing survivor interviews, and offers her help on how to begin climbing the ranks.
5	5	"No More Lies"	Emma Freeman	Kim Ho & Michael Lucas	HIV/AIDS crisis / reporting	12 September 2021	990,000
23–25 April 1986. Helen has convinced Lindsay to finally produce an interview with a mother who contracted HIV through a blood transfusion, but hands the report over to Dale, believing it will help raise his profile. The report goes to air containing claims the blood bank was deliberately targeted with infected blood - against Dale's advice, but with Lindsay's eager consent - and evokes mass ire from the gay community and activists, leading to a protest outside the news offices, at which Helen meets - and Dale reencounters - a compelling individual named Adam. Noelene is sacked when she reveals that the supporting source for the offending claim was fabricated, while Rob threatens to quit if she is not reinstated. Upon hearing that Helen has scheduled a live, on-air interview with Adam and his HIV-positive partner, Geoff insists on co-hosting. His bigoted questioning pleases Lindsay, but perturbs Helen, who visits an upset Dale at home and is shocked by revelations stemming from his past with Adam and closeted adolescence.
6	6	"Meltdown"	Emma Freeman	Michael Lucas	Chernobyl disaster	19 September 2021	1,074,000
26–28 April 1986. Early-morning reports of an incident at Chernobyl trickle in detail-by-detail, leading to Helen and Dale - struggling to disguise her deep animosity towards him - working together to assemble information. Meanwhile, Evelyn's discovery that her husband's health has been worsening, and he has been unwell for longer than she realised, leads her to attempt to convince Lindsay to drop Geoff from anchor duties in favour of a reduced workload. But Lindsay's efforts to organise his departure in an orderly fashion fail dramatically and he is left scrambling to pull together a team for the main bulletin when Rob decides to walk out - not wanting to be the replacement male co-anchor that all the viewers will hate. When Dale is enlisted to co-anchor with Helen on the special evening bulletin instead, the frosty air between them thaws when they finally open up about their traumatic pasts.

== Release ==
On 12 July 2021, the first trailer was released for the series. The series was broadcast on ABC, premiering on 15 August 2021. Alongside, and in the run-up to, the series' launch, the ABC released videos on YouTube and across social media interviewing cast and crew about the specific news events that would be covered in the series.

Entertainment One acquired international distribution rights to The Newsreader in late 2020, and has sold broadcast or streaming rights to the series to Arte in France and Germany, the BBC in the UK, Cosmo in Spain, Filmin in Portugal and Spain, NBCUniversal International Networks in Latin America, Now TV in Hong Kong, RTÉ in Ireland, The Roku Channel in the United States, Telus Presents in Canada, and Viaplay in Poland, the Netherlands and the Nordic and Baltic regions.

In Spain, the series premiered on 10 March 2022 on Cosmo, as part of their Women's Month programming, with the remaining episodes airing weekly, apart from the fifth and sixth airing together on 7 April 2022. In the United States, the series premiered on the Roku Channel on 18 March 2022, in New Zealand on Eden and on-demand platform ThreeNow on 24 March 2022, and in Brazil on Universal TV on 6 April 2022, with an earlier premiere of 30 March 2022, for subscribers of Universal+.

The show premiered in Mexico on 2 May 2022, on premium channel Universal Premiere and paid on-demand platforms. The series was subtitled "The Other Side of the News" (La otra cara de las noticias); the launch was commemorated by a special event of the same name on 11 May, that highlighted the "transformative role [female journalists] can perform [in] achiev[ing] gender equality in and out of the newsroom". It was helmed by Belén Sanz Luque, representative of the UN Women in Mexico, and attended by many experienced female Mexican journalists (including Paola Rojas, Denise Dresser, Pamela Cerdeira, Rossana Fuentes Berain, Bárbara Anderson and Adela Navarro). A photo exhibition and gallery featuring "prominent female journalists" was also featured at the Oasis Coyoacan Mall for the week following the event, in collaboration between Universal Plus and female-run media outlet Opinión 51.

In Ireland, it premiered on RTÉ2 on 7 June 2022 in a double-bill with all six episodes available on RTÉ Player after the first episode's broadcast, and in the United Kingdom premiered on BBC Two on 24 July 2022, also in a double-bill, with the entire series available from earlier that day on BBC iPlayer. The series was first made available in France and Germany by Arte on 26 January 2023 on-demand, with linear broadcasts starting on 2 February 2023.

The series was removed from the Roku Channel in the United States in September 2023, as part of several cost-cutting measures, in this case a move by the streaming service to render unavailable shows that had not been sufficiently popular beyond their initial launch. At some point prior to September 2024, the English version of Arte made the series available to US viewers until mid-November 2024. Following Reid’s role in AMC’s Interview with the Vampire, its streaming channels AMC+ and SundanceNow began showing the series December 2024, with series 2 premiering the following August.

The series premiered on CHCH-DT, which covers southern Ontario in Canada, on 2 April 2024.

== Production ==
The series was created by Michael Lucas and Joanna Werner and directed by Emma Freeman. Filmed in Melbourne, the series was written by Michael Lucas, Jonathan Gavin, Niki Aken and Kim Ho. Joanna Werner and Stuart Menzies, along with Brett Sleigh and Sally Riley on behalf of the ABC, executive produced the series. The series was supported through investments from Screen Australia and Film Victoria.

=== Initial development ===
The inception of The Newsreader was worked on by Michael Lucas following his six-part series Party Tricks in 2014/2015 - and had a "long gestation" period. Initial writing for the series took place "immediately after" Lucas finished working on the fifth series of Offspring in 2015. Initially, it was not centred around a newsroom setting, and instead aimed more simply to write about a male lead yearning to "fulfil" a "particular version of masculinity" that "wasn't an actual fit but he was just desperate to live up to it," a theme Lucas said was based on his own life experiences. This became the character of Dale, before Lucas realised there needed to be a female character to match him with, who would be "possessed of those traditional masculine qualities" instead; she would be "punished for them, whereas he struggles to fit into that masculine ideal." Lucas said the way in which the two characters flipped gender stereotypes was what he "found really compelling about them." Their relationship formed the basis of the series, with the additional layer of a 1980s setting decided upon due to the fact it would impose "more pressure on [the characters] to fulfil certain roles". Lucas then embarked on a year-and-a-half development timeframe, considering what "image of masculinity" the character of Dale would want to achieve. Within a few drafts, he had decided on a newsreader in a newsroom setting, with Lucas calling them "lions" and "voice-of-God men".

"I always love a newsroom show ... For me, it's one of those perfect office environments where stories literally walk through the door, and when everything can change in an instant...It's also a space where you thrash out the big issues in society, there in those four walls."

— Michael Lucas, the creator of the series, in an interview with Flicks.

Over the course of 2015 and 2016, Lucas began researching newsrooms of the 1980s, interviewing those who worked in them at the time and being struck by stories of the culture. Lucas was drawn to learning how female newsreaders - who were a relatively nascent arrival in the 1980s - coped in an environment that put so much pressure on them, caught in an "era of change". He claimed they had to figure out how to "define how [they] should look in a workplace" and present themselves, as viewers still "liked hearing the news read by very masculine voices of God". Lucas has kept the identities of those he interviewed private, but Leigh Sales admitted to her part in his research ahead of the second series. Her stories and recollections have had a major impact on the series, and she has provided "a really great way of explaining the dynamics of relationships". Furthermore, she provided intricate details of the workings of a newsroom, such as the autocue, and the "panic" she felt at potentially something going wrong and "getting yelled at"; Lucas said that her regaling of these experiences inspired the character of Noelene.

Lucas noted the significance of most of his research into the culture of newsrooms of the time being conducted prior to the #MeToo movement, recollecting in an interview in 2021, how he questioned whether there would be a "profound change" that resulted from the movement, or whether society would have moved on by the time the show was broadcast. He lamented upon then-recent revelations about the culture in Parliament, and how "you realise we might have progressed in some ways, but there's still a lot of structural problems and a culture of bullying and misogyny linked to that." Lucas described the depth of research he undertook, claiming he "read nearly every newspaper from 1986" and that letters to the editor were of great significance and useful, as "they give you the full picture of what people were making of things [then]."

=== Inclusion of real-life events ===
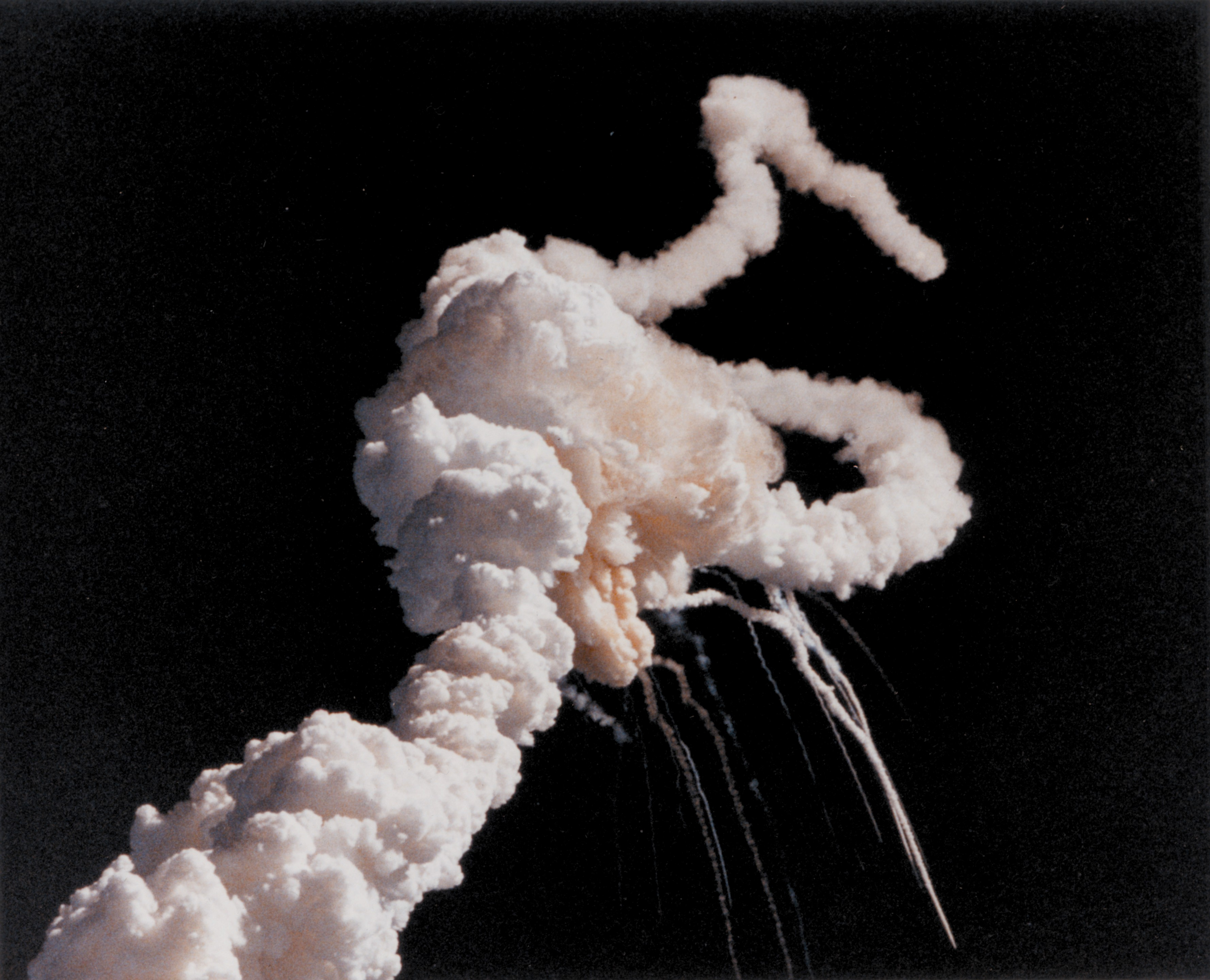
The Challenger launch and explosion, the main news event focus of the first episode

The first iteration of The Newsreader was written on spec, and a pilot was scripted, with which Lucas approached the ABC, having worked with the network on sitcom Rosehaven. Lucas also considered taking the series to Foxtel, but thought the story would be a better fit for a non-commercial broadcaster; the ABC responded positively "really quickly", and they had the added advantage of an extensive archive of news footage and coverage that could be used. Lucas has said that he consciously reads newspapers, and watches archived bulletins, from the time "through a modern lens" in order to "see them in a completely new light", not only to fully take on board and recognise "the passage of time but also what I understood then as a child versus what I understood now".

Brett Sleigh at the ABC - who would become an executive producer on the series - suggested using actual, famous events as the structure of the series, as it was previously just set around "generic stories" like the more expansive rollout of ATMs; Sleigh was enthusiastic about "making the most of ABC archives", and recommended Joanna Werner, to whom Lucas gave the draft pilot script and became "really connected with it" with "clear vision about where it would go". Lucas said he immediately knew to start with the Challenger explosion, as that was the first major news event he remembered from childhood, while for the rest of the series picked events simply by looking at what happened during the first half of 1986, explicating that covering Chernobyl was unavoidable, but also that the series also covers less "date-specific" stories such as the HIV/AIDS epidemic.

From this, the decision was made to "tightly stick to a real-life timeframe", with episodes taking place over the course of only a few days at most. The crew received VHS tapes containing playouts of broadcast news bulletins on certain days, in order to judge the importance and prioritisation of certain news stories on the days episodes take place on. Freeman chose to signify to viewers as to specific dates on which events happened, which appear on screen at the start of each episode. Lucas, who was only experienced in writing "pure fiction", said that despite the somewhat "maddening" challenges that came with weaving in real-life events into the series, "following real events is what makes The Newsreader special", and it was a "fun puzzle" to "take those real life events and keep to the real dates, the real timeline," being aware of the "markers [you] have to hit", and simultaneously "weave fictional characters around them," to "take these real-life events that have their ebbs and flows that I can't change, and how that can provoke different relationships and turning points for the characters," and how to link them to elements of their personalities. He also claimed that the show does not entirely depend on those events being depicted, as regardless of whether viewers remember the events or not, the show allows for a "really interesting window into what those events were like and how newsrooms navigated them."

Discussing the process of writing the third episode, Lucas revealed that "at the plotting stage, [he would] go into the ABC archives, and take footage of the dates [he wanted]", watching The 7:30 Report or Mary Delahunty's news report, which "would all feed back into the story." Lucas was inspired by James Cameron's Titanic "as to how he placed his characters within the history of real events"; he described his approach through the example of how "[w]hen it comes to something like Lindy Chamberlain, they found the matinee jacket on this day, then on another day she was released from jail, then another she was back in Mt. Isa. So how do I manoeuvre my fictional characters around all of that to build a story?" He explained that the lack of date specificity, relative to the other events depicted in the show, meant he was able to place the (fifth) episode focusing on the AIDS crisis anywhere within the running order of the series, and was "deliberately positioned" as such "to get maximum emotional impact for the characters". Writing the show meant dealing with the balance between how to convey facts and emotions; Lucas said that the news story could be incredibly significant and prominent with set dates to operate in and around, so he "would have to think about what to do with the characters," whereas at "other times [he would] want to take characters to an emotional place".

=== Writing in general ===
Lucas wrote the series alone for a lengthy period of time while it was on spec, until he was able to form a writers' room around 2017. When he did, he hired those he knew would provide valuable roles to develop the programme, such as Niki Aken, who came from a research background, invited to be part of a "brainstorm" for the series, and wrote an outline (Aken remarked that her contributions to the programme were impacted by the pandemic, writing during the lockdown in Melbourne while in hotel quarantine in Sydney). Lucas also carried on a practice he engaged with during his roles on various programmes as a script coordinator, in finding and hiring an emerging writer, in this case Kim Ho; Lucas was impressed by his writing, with Ho asked to script coordinate and note-take, and the two co-wrote the fifth episode together. Debra Oswald also acted as script consultant for the series.

The pandemic also afforded Lucas an extended period for development, with the start of pre-production delayed by four months, and spoke of him and production designer Melinda Doring taking advantage of that time, being able to collaborate further through Zoom meetings and using Dropbox folders to share and store potentially useful material; Doring sourced additional material from museums and online forums, with Lucas in awe of her dedication to the work and lamenting that he was unable to incorporate everything into the scripts. The delay also worked in Lucas' favour with his writing; his style is to "work intensely, go away and come back", to "pick it up fresh" after potentially "months away from it", having secured additional development funding and achieved a greater objectivity during the hiatus.

Lucas said the writing team were "bouncing back and forth", looking at the timeline and the characters, specifically where character arcs fit into the way in which the real-life events are depicted in the show. Before the writing of each episode, the research and archive footage "would be locked in", and only then would the writing progress onto working on the character arcs, so when a writer was assigned to an episode, a "comprehensive outline of the factual events involved would already be in place" to start with. Lucas spoke of how the "emotional arcs and storylines" were less set in stone in the run-up to filming, and that they "tend[ed] to evolve a lot even within the timeline structure we had set" and that "was always an ongoing discussion up to and including being on set, and then even to a certain extent in the edit suite", that they "were still honing those emotional beats and moments."

Lucas claimed that he actively chose to "pare back" certain elements of newsrooms of the era that are looked back on negatively now, as he thought a "contemporary audience" would not approve if he "had directly translated" the sexism, racism, homophobia and misogyny that he had been informed were commonplace and institutionalised at the time. Lucas expanded on this, saying that there needed to be a balance between "be[ing] frank about the reality of it, but at the same time you don't want to traumatise viewers"; he chose to depict racism in a less explicit way, such as without use of racial epithets and employing how racism could be more subtle, using the example of the Korean character of Noelene being assumed to know how to translate Japanese, and that the other characters "have put in no effort to find out where her family have come from". He concluded that "[o]ur attempt is to show the full spectrum of that world and to depict the parts that were loaded with bullying and misogyny, and the parts that were exhilarating."

=== Commission and filming ===
Securing international distribution for the series proved troublesome at first. Prospective distributors were interested when shown scripts, but the "Australian specificity" of the series, as well as the era chosen for the period setting, made them hesitant. As a result, Lucas "became conscious of picking stories that have some international resonance", such as the Azaria Chamberlain case, covered in the third episode, which is a "quintessential Australian story, but means something overseas as well". Despite this, Werner spoke of how the accuracy with which they aimed to recreate the period setting was significant to "partners involved" in the series, describing how they took reference from movies in the late 1980s such as Tootsie and Working Girl to implement a neutral palette of "beige[s] and browns" in the show - what she deemed a "grounded approach", in contrast to the brash and bold colours in many depictions of the 1980s, invoking MTV music videos as one example, as "we wanted to look like [it was] made in the '80s - not a show made about the '80s". To accentuate this, cameras for filming were fitted with vintage lenses.

The series' commission was announced in April 2020, entered pre-production by October, with the casting announced that November; six episodes were ordered by the ABC, despite the series being originally developed for eight.

"I was just really lucky that I was working with the actors in particular and the director, Emma Freeman, who was a huge part of the storytelling of this show. We were all really attracted by the idea of showing a love and a kinship that didn't entirely fit into any particular box. In some ways, they're [Dale and Helen] a brilliant team; and in some ways, they're made for each other, but there are core things about them that mean they don't fit into a conventional box. There are innate aspects of their personalities that mean they're wonderful together but also that they can't ever be the conventional couple the world wants them to be. We just love sitting in that space."

— Michael Lucas, speaking about the dominant plotting of the series and the framing it sits within, and how working with director Freeman helped develop this.

The series was filmed over 54 shoot days during late 2020 and early 2021, under COVID-19 restrictions. As a result, plans for expansive location filming could not take place, such as being unable to film in Darwin, in the Northern Territory, for the third episode, which is partly set there, and instead restricted to the state of Victoria where the show is otherwise entirely set. Scenes in the episode where Dale and Helen, among other journalists, are camped outside a house they believe Lindy Chamberlain is staying at, were filmed in Mildura, with many local residents having been chosen to portray extras and offered up the exterior of their homes to use for filming; such filming took place in March 2021. The scenes in the episode where the various journalists and cameramen are waiting outside Berrimah Prison for Lindy Chamberlain's release were also filmed in Mildura, with stills during the filming shot by Adrian Chiarella, husband to Lucas. Scenes in the fourth episode depicting the Russell Street bombing were filmed at the site of the bombing itself, Lucas commenting that the filming "shut down an entire city block"; Niki Aken, writer of the fourth episode, played an extra during the scenes in the aftermath of the bombing. Creator Lucas himself cameoed during the second episode, portraying a DJ at Geoff's birthday party; scenes for that were shot over three days, and commented that the experience of cameoing gave him the chance to become more accustomed with the cast. Filming of the News at Six studio was done at the NEP Studios in Southbank, South Melbourne, with the newsroom offices set in a disused chemical warehouse/factory in Brooklyn, west of Melbourne.

Creator Lucas and director Freeman worked closely and collaboratively on- and off-set, with clear roles set out for the two; during the writing process, Freeman provides Lucas with notes on the script from cast and other crew, and during her directing, he acts as "a support" for her on set. Lucas described Freeman as the "prime storyteller" on set, his presence to "help with speedbumps with the script or to troubleshoot". He later said that, the way in which he engages in constant communication with other cast members, with their input, during the process of writing and filming, that the series was a "mutual creation". Freeman commented it was a "special project" as the cast and her - as the director - were "so aligned", meaning it is an "incredibly collaborative show", with Reid and Torv "help[ing to] develop the script on the floor". Her method of directing is controlled by the "want to capture energy on set" before "finessing in cut", because trying to set-up and control the energy of a scene in post-production comes across "forced". She admitted it was "not a terribly cutty show", which was important to her as "you want to really preserve the natural energy of, in particular, Helen and Dale".

=== Casting and characterisation ===
Actress Marg Downey won the role of Evelyn Walters after she submitted an audition tape recorded at home, and that the first scene she shot was with William McInnes and filmed out-of-order, featuring early in the sixth episode. For Robert Taylor, a vocal coach from the era was hired, due to the need to "sharply define his vocal style, versus the more relaxed style ... he has". Downey spoke of how she considered, when being asked to audition for Evelyn, her as being "an intriguing sort of choice to suggest me for this role", but after receiving the script "thought 'I can do this. I've met these women'," specifically referring to individuals - "those sort of people who are the power behind the throne" and "although they look as though they might not be manipulating things behind the scenes, in fact, they're very powerful" - her mother was acquaintances with. Downey called Evelyn a "wonderful role" to play. Chum Ehelopa claimed that when the show was pitched to him, he was unaware the show would revolve around real-life events. There is a "fair amount", but not "uncontrolled amount" of ad-libbing by the cast and improvisation around the script, particularly by William McInnes.

Michelle Lim Davidson spoke of how the role of Noelene was adapted for her, and that she was hesitant to audition to play the part of a Korean woman due to concerns about whether Australian television was open to such representation; it was the first time she had auditioned to play the part of a Korean woman in her decade-long television career, and commented that she "never envisioned the day that [she] would play the first Korean Aus[tralian] woman in a major drama on Aus[tralian] TV". Lim Davidson spoke of the sense of jeong she felt on set of the family home of her character, and that she had "an overwhelming sense that [she] had arrived home", praising the "care and detailed accuracy of the Kim home" by the design, arts and props department - especially production designer Doring, and aided by writer/director and friend of hers, Undi Lee - and actress Hany Lee in helping her learn her Korean/Hangul dialogue. She said that she had "struggled with [her] Korean identity", her childhood and adolescence in Australia meaning she had not been "submerged in [her] cultural heritage", and how she felt she had been "running away from [her] cultural identity", expecting that she "wouldn't be able to find a safe space to be [her]self in the industry" and expressed her hopes her portrayal would lead to expanding Korean representation on television.

"We wanted to show what it really was like to be a woman in the workforce in the '80s without the judgement that we put on it today. There's a couple of sequences with Helen where you just go, "She is just berated by these men, who are her bosses, just one, after the other, after the other, after the other," and most days she can take it, and then some days she can't ... I'm really curious to see what the response is to her, and I'm curious to see what the response is to what it is to be a woman in the workforce in the '80s. And I think that there's some elements that are quite shocking and, and also really true."

— Anna Torv, speaking about the experience of portraying a woman working in the male-dominated news industry during the 1980s.

Anna Torv received the first two scripts of the series before she decided to take up the role, and was cast in early 2020. When asked on The Newsreader Podcast what Torv drew on to create Helen and her persona, and specifically how she was able to distinguish her persona as a person outside of work and as the 'newsreader', she recalled how when she first read the scripts, she labelled her as a newsreader, and did not think about the journalist side that the character would have needed to have a background in to get to the position of 'newsreader'. She spoke of how she had portrayed a political journalist in another TV programme before - in which she had "dug in" and met with prominent political journalists in Canberra - and "put that to one side" and thought "she's a presenter".

Torv wanted to ensure that she "truly represent[ed]" the female newsreaders of the time, and described her character as being an "amalgamation" of the female newsreaders she grew up watching every night, re-watching news coverage from the era to help finesse the development of the character. Torv reported how she invested "most of [her] energy into what it was to be a newsreader", including learning the significance of the autocue; her lines in scenes in which her character was delivering the news were read from an autocue. She discovered it was "the best way to perfect her delivery", realising "how connected the autocue was with the intonation and all the rest of it"; this appreciation helped by partaking in sessions with someone who had been hired to teach the news reading, and learned "that the phrasing, and all that kind of stuff, comes purely through the autocue" as the "way you speak as a newsreader is because you can't see the next word." It was these lessons through which Torv acknowledged the background of her character's journalism and how it could not be separated from, and how it influenced, Helen as a newsreader, and portraying her as the latter could not be done without taking on board that "you have to come up". She described the attention to detail with appreciating the "gap between public and personal" that would have to be employed in her portrayal, enabled by the "heightened element of being on the news desk"; as "in order for people to hold on and believe [that person]" you have to "strip back". There were conversations about the right affectations and the hairstyle Helen as the 'newsreader' would need to have.

The process of developing the "texture of the character", according to Torv, "was everything you dream of ... as an actor". This stemmed from working with creator Lucas - whom Torv praised as "one of those incredibly beautiful and confident writers, and also confident creators, who sits at the table and is open", with whom "you feel like you're a part of the development," which she found "invigorating" as "it doesn't happen for actors all that often" - and producer Werner and director Freeman (who Torv has worked with before), saying that she "loved the collaboration" she was able to engage in with both, which was behind why she was so enthusiastic to be part of the show, acclaiming Freeman as "a brilliant director" who "creates such a fantastic environment for, like, play – honestly." It was this collaboration that Torv praised as enabling her to feel more able to improvise when in character; with improvisation, Torv said you "kinda stay on point" - and "like[s] to be loose but with guidelines" - but that if you want to improvise and take things "into a different direction to see if there are more interesting ways to play it and need to muck around with stuff", she "often switch[es] things around" or "sends frantic emails to Michael [Lucas] and Emma [Freeman] the night before", then "come in and give the other actor a chance". She further acclaimed how the "whole team", including co-stars Reid and McInnes, "clicked right from the get go". She explained that the character of Helen was "fun to play because you can fly off the handle and you don't have to hold any of the stuff in" and "can just shoot from the hip". Torv commented that "[m]aking The Newsreader was one of the most satisfying and joyous creative experiences that [she had] ever had". Torv also revealed that the ending of the series was not known from the beginning of production, and that the cast were only aware of the show's general direction for a time.

=== Refining character details and backgrounds ===
Both characters of Helen and Dale were based on actual Australian journalists and newsreaders from the past, but Torv and Reid have refused to admit which inspired their portrayals. When deciding who to base characters on, Lucas took a "collage approach" and was "careful not to make it too direct" and obvious which real-life industry figures he had taken inspiration from. He said, simply, that Helen was the "inverse" of Dale, possessing "the qualities celebrated in a man but punished in a woman". Torv has denied speculation her portrayal of Helen is based on Jana Wendt, but said she watched a variety of journalists in order to play Helen rather than focusing on one. Reid admitted there was "one very, very specific one that [he] studied very closely" in the first series, and while in the second series "a bit of him" remains in his character, "another one ... came in to kind of help show the progression".

Reid commented that Dale has always held a belief that "the pinnacle of everything that represents stability and assuredness" and the "archetype of what it is to be a man [and] a voice of authority is represented in this newsreader kind of form". He echoed Lucas' earlier comments on the character attempting to, yet failing, to achieve a certain calibre of masculinity, speaking of what he perceives as a common drive in Australia "to hold specific models of masculinity up on pedestals and applaud them and push other ones into the shadows", and that "[t]he framework of a news reader, this stable, firm hand who delivers the news nightly and that the nation trusts, is a really good way to explore that". He explains that as Dale progressively strives to achieve this ideal, he begins to hide his true self and is slowly replaced by a "carbon copy of a man" that he isn't "that good at" being. He expanded on this, saying Dale rejecting the "naive [and] sensitive ... part of himself", as he transitions into "this statuesque carbon copy of what he thinks a stable human being might be", is what the cast refer to as "Dead Dale", a version of the character in which he is "selling himself out". When developing a style for Dale as a newsreader, Reid remarked of his collaboration with director Freeman, and their constant work on the issue of the "public and private mask" that is prevalent in newsreading - newsreading requiring a "blank personality" in which "you can't invest too much of your personality". Reid has attempted to make clear that the show was presenting Dale not as "necessarily acting out on repressed sexual urges to be with a man", but "also acting out on repressed intimacy in general". He spoke of how he has found the experience of playing Dale cathartic, as he "like[s] to lean into the most awkward parts" of himself that he feels the character embodies. He added that the character's clothes are "designed to make him feel uncomfortable", such as "jackets that are slightly too big or pants just a bit too short", with Dale "rarely sighted out of work clothes".

The character of Lindsay is not "based on anyone in particular", but in Lucas' rounds of interviews with news presenters of the time, John Sorrell and Peter Meakin "came up a LOT", and "they clearly shared some qualities". The character of Cheryl is based on Sue Hollins, a makeup artist with whom the show's hair and makeup artist John Logue worked with at the start of his career and who still works in the industry, currently at the ABC.

With regard to backstories for characters that may not be directly written into the show but are used to generate context for the cast as to their characters' behaviours, mannerisms, and beliefs, Lucas said that does not share backstories he has in mind for characters unless they ask, as part of an actor's process is "to build their own one based off the script". He spoke of at least Reid and Torv who have added to, or "heightened details" of their characters, with assistance from Freeman. Torv spoke of how it "alternates with all work" on the extent to which a character's backstory is seen as significant, and said she and Lucas "d⁯id have a chat" to discuss Helen's past. When asked about how much effort they put into their characters' backstories, Lim Davidson said "[t]he entire team have done a lot of research", and they "start quite broadly, especially for a character like Noelene", who is only afforded limited time in the series due to being a less prominent main character and so only "a certain amount of time to ... reveal parts of her life". Nevertheless, it was something she took "very seriously because I feel a lot of responsibility to bring the most authentic version of this character to screen", and that "whenever you're trying to merge a cultural heritage that you're not used to seeing on Australian television, you have extra responsibility and you need to respect the people from that time period and do your best to bring it to life". McInnes, in contrast, said he "didn't see any point in going down that route because it's just there on the paper", and that "sometimes you just have to know what's required of you to make the scene work", but admitted "both ways are just as ... appropriate" and "you've gotta know what suits".

=== Historical accuracy ===
==== Characters ====
Careful detail was employed by the show's costume, hair and makeup designers; multiple cast and crew members have spoken about creating the 'looks' of certain characters. John Logue, hair and makeup artist for the series - with experience of doing the make-up of newsreaders during the era - commented of Helen's hairstyle, that "there's quite a sort of build that goes underneath that". He added that on occasion, Logue and Torv mutually agreed to leave the hair as it was after each day of filming - no brushing or washing - and remarked "the best we ever did was five days with Anna ... and she was pretty happy with that". On Noelene's hair, he suggested to Lim Davidson to replace her "very long, straight hair" with curtains, but what would be called a "flick" during the era, something he reported was universally approved of.

Costume designer Zed Dragojlovich said there was a different method for each character in finding outfits - and whether they are right and appropriate - for them. He spoke of the importance when developing a character; "what you're looking for when you put the clothes on is something that kind of speaks really clearly about the character and then when you try something else and you feel like you've lost the essence of that character then you know you're going in the wrong direction". With Dale and Helen, production assumed they would have access to the more high-end fashion labels of the era with access to a network stylist, for which fashion magazines from the time were very useful. Creating the look for Marg Downey's Evelyn relied on "continuing ... the DNA of that character; very structured, precise tailoring"; he "did try a few flowing things on Marg [but] it just looked like somebody else". Dragojlovich then invoked a contact of his that he worked with during the 1980s - costume designer Michael Chisholm, in possession of a warehouse replete with clothes from the era; as a result, he found "an amazing oversized houndstooth jacket" that Chisholm divulged he had made personally for Downey in the eighties. Dragojlovich brought the jacket to a fitting with Downey, who "shrieked" in recognition. Dragojlovich worked with Logue on developing the look for Evelyn; Dragojlovich recommended during fittings with Downey a hairstyle of a blonde hair bob for the character, which Logue initially had different ideas for, but eventually agreed with.

==== News events ====
With regards to the presentation of the news events the series covers, some elements have been observed to be lightly historically inaccurate. Lucas himself admitted the one thing he was "slightly playing with [was] the first visibility of Halley's Comet, which is a little bit compressed," which was picked up on by the ABC in an article wherein Matt Neal noted "the unlikely but dramatically convenient feat of seeing a brilliant and highly visible Halley's Comet in the Melbourne sky on February 1, 1986", as "[t]he optimal viewing time for Australia was in April," and citing the fever among the public surrounding the return of the comet being diluted at that time due to "the comet's distance from Earth and our planet's tilt meant it wasn't very bright, plus cloudy skies and light pollution meant city-dwellers' best chance to see the comet was with a telescope somewhere more rural." Neal also noted that a small claim in the first episode surrounding Melbourne Zoo's Butterfly House receiving its millionth visitor was dubious as it had only opened two months earlier and the Zoo itself "averages about 1.5 million visitors per year."

Neal and Flora Carr, from the UK's Radio Times, also wrote that the decision to call the Chernobyl disaster "the worst nuclear disaster ever" in the sixth episode may have been overly premature, and the positioning of the announcement of Prince Andrew and Sarah Ferguson's engagement was also compressed, featuring during the opening to the fourth episode, which was set over a week after the news was actually made public in reality.

== Reception ==
=== Viewership ===
The Newsreader was the fourth-most-watched Australian free-to-air adult drama series in 2021, and was the ABC's most-watched drama programme of 2021 - with the network reporting it achieved an average audience of 1.5 million viewers across linear and on-demand platforms - as well as its highest-rated new drama premiere of the year in the 25-54 age demographic.

Series 1 ratings (Australia) All overnight ratings reported exclude on-demand viewership, known as BVOD.
Ep	Airdate	Metro				Total/National				Refs
Ep	Airdate	Overnights	Rank	Consolidated	Rank	Overnights	Rank	Consolidated	Rank	Refs
1	15 August 2021	552,000	10	885,000	5	819,000	9	1,244,000	5	
2	22 August 2021	508,000	10	747,000	~7	744,000	9	1,080,000	N/A	
3	29 August 2021	439,000	11	703,000	~8	639,000	10	983,000	N/A	
4	5 September 2021	446,000	11	726,000	6	653,000	10	1,032,000	7	
5	12 September 2021	386,000	14	690,000	8	603,000	10	990,000	8	
6	19 September 2021	429,000	10	749,000	5	651,000	10	1,074,000	5	

The Newsreader was broadcast on BBC2 in the UK in double-bills over three weeks in summer 2022, though all episodes were made available on-demand on BBC iPlayer before the series' premiere. The first episode recorded 620,000 viewers, with the entire series averaging 350,000 viewers among those watching the linear broadcast only; these figures are only of those who watched on the night of broadcast.

Including those who watched in the seven days post-broadcast, the first episode rose to 1.1 million viewers, with each episode, on average across the six episodes, growing 133% from viewership on the night of broadcast after a week of catch-up. The show also became the channel's most-watched Sunday night drama in over four years, and was the most-watched new series across on-demand/streaming services of the public service broadcasters in the UK in the week post-launch. After 28 days, the first episode's viewership increased further to 1.4 million viewers. No viewership statistics, however, that include those who watched on-demand prior to linear broadcast, nor those seemingly including viewership on non-TV devices, have been reported.

=== Critical response ===
For the first series, on review aggregator Rotten Tomatoes, 100% of 19 critics gave a positive review, with an average rating of 7.4/10. The website's critics consensus reads, "An engrossing recreation of the 1980s television beat, The Newsreader mines authentic drama and laughs thanks to its verisimilitude and a commanding Anna Torv."

==== In Australia ====
The series was critically praised. The Guardian's Luke Buckmaster, in a four-star review, praised Torv and Reid in "deliver[ing] fine performances as characters you want to keep spending time with, though you're not sure exactly why", the cinematography in lending the series a "placid and non-confronting tone, reflected in the graceful camerawork and scaled-back colour schemes", and the writing for "using real-life media stories as the scaffolding for character-related fiction, the former complementing the latter, without big-noting the subjects or rearranging history". He did, however, offer critique, opining that "the show is pretty toothless in terms of industry and cultural commentary", noting anachronistic diversity in representation of Australian newsrooms of the time; Helen Vatsikopoulos in The Canberra Times, who worked as a journalist during The Newsreader's temporal setting, also observed that newsrooms of the era "were not as diverse as the programme pretends". Buckmaster then included The Newsreader in a list of the top 10 Australian television shows of 2021, ranking it ninth; he expanded on his opinion of the series further, saying it "has a slightly glossed-over vibe – evoking a feeling that some of the rough edges of history have been smoothed", but that the series is "crafted with a dignified sensibility and uses historical events as dramatic scaffolding", with "elegance of the show's compositions and the relatability of its well-developed characters keep[ing] it a pleasure to watch".

Karl Quinn, in a five-star review for The Sydney Morning Herald, called the series "brilliant" and a "terrific ensemble piece", "beautifully handled by director Emma Freeman" with "incisive, empathetic and funny scripts" by Lucas, concluding it was "the most fun [he'd] had watching telly in a long time." David Free, also in The Sydney Morning Herald, commented it was "the best show [he'd] seen in yonks", lavishing praise on the attention-to-detail in the series, in the clothes, language and propwork. However, Marama Whyte, in an article for History Australia journal, wrote that such details were relatively facile, saying "the period setting is style without much substance", as "[i]t wants the shoulder pads and typewriters, without engaging with the fact that this was an industry on the cusp of colossal change. It gives the distinct sense of being a setting chosen for aesthetics and convenience, rather than any reason directly related to the plot or argument."

Sinead Stubbins of The Sydney Morning Herald - in a review of both the first and second series - proclaimed that The Newsreader was "the slick, addictive and excellent local drama that might be the best show Australia has produced in years", praising "the determination to use historical events and attitudes to illuminate something about our present" and how the show "uses ... huge world events cleverly ... they aren't just dumped in the middle of an episode", and "though there are occasional cute moments, [they] are woven into the lives of these reporters". She added that while there was "a certain safety in covering current issues through a historical lens", the show "particularly excels at when it comes to homophobia and racism in the workplace".

==== International ====
Rachel Aroesti from The Guardian in the United Kingdom also wrote similarly, claiming that "it is hard to feel fully enveloped in The Newsreader's world", and despite its "news-heavy plotlines" holds a "generic backdrop that smoothes out the quirks of the period and the setting". On other matters, she lamented that the show appeared to "shrink away from its fascinating, disruptive female lead", with Torv and her character of Helen Norville more deserving of being the focus of the show. Nevertheless, she praised the leads as "brilliant", and how the series allows for a "trip down memory lane [that] complements a subtler, mysterious and slower-paced set of character-driven storylines", considering it "a classy, well-acted period drama" that "is excellent at capturing the weird, restrained elation that a large-scale tragedy can bring to a newsroom ... and neatly sums up something decidedly murky about journalism in the process". James Croot for Stuff in New Zealand had similar thoughts, saying "for all Reid's ... understated impressiveness, this is really Torv's ... show. Looking almost like a dead ringer for Cate Blachett [sic], she delivers a performance of power, grit and authority that her more illustrious countrywoman would be proud of. In Torv's hands, maybe Helen Norville is actually Australia's answer to Murphy Brown or Mary Tyler Moore. Regardless of any such futile comparisons, she is what drives The Newsreader." Croot nevertheless called the show "excellent", claiming "what grounds the show ... and makes it compelling viewing – is the seemingly unlikely relationship between Helen and Dale [and that] [w]atching them combine and spark off one another during a key broadcast was potentially as enthralling as if it had been the real thing."

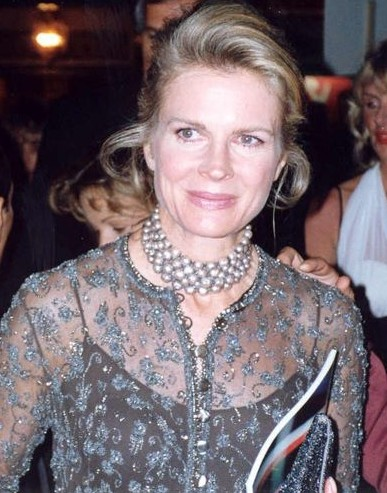
Reviewer James Croot compared Torv's portrayal of Helen Norville to that of character Murphy Brown in the eponymous American sitcom, played by Candice Bergen, seen here in 1993 during the show's original run.

Most other reviews upon its premiere in the United Kingdom were largely positive. Carol Midgley, in The Times' four-star review, also observed, and praised, the attention-to-detail with the features of the period setting, calling the series "nostalgic", while also commenting on "the quickfire writing" and "strong performances" in the series, calling it a "joy to watch" primarily due to Torv's "complex" performance as Helen "with fabulous nuance". Also in a four-star review, for the i newspaper, Rachael Sigee wrote that the show's two leads are "excellent", with "a strong ensemble cast", yet admitted there was "a slight soapiness to some elements of the plot", but that the "set-up lends itself to melodrama", and overall was a "fun but flinty story that revels in its 80s setting". Dan Einav, in another four-star review, in the Financial Times, also lauded Torv's performance and "organic rapport with Reid", stating that "what [the show] lacks in grand themes, [it] more than makes up for in the strength of the characterisations and performances".

Helen Hawkins of The Arts Desk, in her four-star review, noted the diversity of ethnic and cultural backgrounds of some of the characters, calling it "a mini melting pot that allows the script to probe the unattractive hidden currents of Australian corporate life", and that a strength of the show is "the unshowy way it goes about stirring this pot. There are no unearned crises or implausible twists. Life itself is left to provide those. The writing carves out niches for the characters inside the potential stereotypes, and the actors rise to it". She also wrote that the "period feel of the piece is masterfully done, a filter giving it a dingy look that accentuates the browns, beiges and dirty greens of the spot-on decor and fashions", and not in a way that is "screaming "Look how authentic we've made it!"", as well as that what "the script also gratifyingly gets right" is one of the underlying issues explored in the show of the "emergence of the data-driven approach ... at this stage, the data are the station's all-important ratings" with "[s]erious news ... doomed if the ratings say people don't watch it readily and want only entertainment."

In a positive review in Público, María José Arias wrote that "[t]he ins and outs of television and the journalism that is done in it are a universe as interesting as it is dynamic that, well planned and explored, can give way [to], true television jewels", and that The Newsreader "is a good example of how to do it", claiming the series' hook is its "ability to give a fast and agile rhythm to the drama ... without forgetting to take care of the details that make the viewer connect and empathize with what happens to their characters", adding "although it is still a drama, it has its touches of humour and hooks you from the first moment with its touch of romance and its plots of business politics". She spoke further of how the character of Geoff "perfectly embodies that old glory of journalism addicted to the spotlight and being in the limelight unable to retire ... to make way for new generations."

The series ranked fourth in Variety's top 13 list of The Best International TV Shows of 2021.

==== Response to accusations of anachronism over race representation ====
After some reviews of the first series accused The Newsreader of depicting a newsroom with greater diversity and minority representation than in reality at the time, Chum Ehelepola wrote on Instagram "that is [not] a failing of the show", but rather "a failing of the times". He went further to say that "hopefully we don't make the same mistake in 2021 and onwards" and that Australian television "showcases the richness of [A]ustralians and the vibrancy of a diverse cast."

=== Awards ===
At the 11th AACTA Awards in 2022, the show was nominated for more awards than any other program.

Year	Award	Category	Nominee	Result	Ref
2022	Australian Directors Guild Awards	Best Direction in a TV or SVOD Drama Series Episode	Emma Freeman - "The Newsreader, Episode 1 – Three, Two, One..."	Won	
2022	AWGIE Awards	Best Script for Television – Series	Niki Aken – "A Step Closer to the Madness"	Nominated	
2022	AWGIE Awards	Best Script for Television – Series	Kim Ho and Michael Lucas – "No More Lies"	Won	
2022	2022 MEAA Equity Ensemble Awards	Outstanding Performance by an Ensemble in a Drama Series 2022	The Newsreader - Anna Torv, Sam Reid, Robert Taylor, William McInnes, Michelle Lim Davidson, Chum Ehelepola, Stephen Peacocke, Marg Downey, Chai Hansen, Maude Davey, Jackson Tozer, Maria Angelico	Won	
2022	2022 Logie Awards	Most Outstanding Drama Series	The Newsreader	Won	
2022	2022 Logie Awards	Most Popular Drama Program	The Newsreader	Nominated	
2022	2022 Logie Awards	Most Outstanding Actress	Anna Torv	Won	
2022	2022 Logie Awards	Most Popular Actress	Anna Torv	Nominated	
2022	2022 Logie Awards	Most Outstanding Actor	Sam Reid	Nominated	
2022	2022 Logie Awards	Most Outstanding Supporting Actor	William McInnes	Nominated	
2022	2022 SPA Awards	Drama Series Production of the Year	The Newsreader	Won	
2021	11th AACTA Awards	Best Television Drama Series	The Newsreader – Joanna Werner & Michael Lucas (ABC)	Won	
2021	11th AACTA Awards	Best Lead Actor – Drama	Sam Reid	Nominated	
2021	11th AACTA Awards	Best Lead Actress – Drama	Anna Torv	Won	
2021	11th AACTA Awards	Best Guest or Supporting Actor – Drama	William McInnes	Won	
2021	11th AACTA Awards	Best Guest or Supporting Actor – Drama	Stephen Peacocke	Nominated	
2021	11th AACTA Awards	Best Guest or Supporting Actress – Drama	Michelle Lim Davidson	Nominated	
2021	11th AACTA Awards	Best Guest or Supporting Actress – Drama	Marg Downey	Nominated	
2021	11th AACTA Awards	Best Screenplay	Michael Lucas – Episode 1: Three, Two, One...	Nominated	
2021	11th AACTA Awards	Best Screenplay	Kim Ho & Michael Lucas – Episode 5: No More Lies	Nominated	
2021	11th AACTA Awards	Best Direction in a Drama or Comedy	Emma Freeman – Episode 1: Three, Two, One...	Won	
2021	11th AACTA Awards	Best Cinematography in Television	Earle Dresner – Episode 1: Three, Two, One...	Nominated	
2021	11th AACTA Awards	Best Editing in Television	Angie Higgins – Episode 5: No More Lies	Nominated	
2021	11th AACTA Awards	Best Sound in Television	Nick Godkin – Episode 1: Three, Two, One	Nominated	
2021	11th AACTA Awards	Best Production Design in Television	Melinda Doring – Episode 1: Three, Two, One...	Won	
2021	11th AACTA Awards	Best Costume Design in Television	Marion Boyce – Episode 1: Three, Two, One...	Nominated	
2021	11th AACTA Awards	Best Casting	Nathan Lloyd	Nominated	
2021	2021 TV Blackbox Awards	Most Popular Australian Drama	The Newsreader	Won	
2021	2021 TV Blackbox Awards	Most Popular Actor	Anna Torv (for both The Newsreader and Fires)	Nominated	
2021	2021 TV Blackbox Awards	Most Popular Actor	Stephen Peacocke (for The Newsreader, RFDS and Five Bedrooms)	Nominated	
2021	2021 Casting Guild Awards	Best Casting in a TV Drama, TV Miniseries and Telemovie	Nathan Lloyd	Won	

== See also ==
- The Newsreader
- The Newsreader series 2
- The Newsreader series 3
