= The Newsreader =

Australian television series

- Genre: Drama
- Created by: Michael Lucas
- Written by: Michael Lucas; Jonathan Gavin; Niki Aken; Kim Ho; Adrian Russell Wills
- Directed by: Emma Freeman
- Starring: Anna Torv; Sam Reid; Robert Taylor; William McInnes
- Composer: Cornel Wilczek
- Country of origin: Australia
- Original language: English
- No. of series: 3
- No. of episodes: 18

Production
- Executive producers: Joanna Werner; Stuart Menzies
- Producers: Joanna Werner; Michael Lucas; Sally Riley; Brett Sleigh
- Production locations: Melbourne, Victoria
- Running time: 51–60 minutes
- Production company: Werner Film Productions

Original release
- Network: ABC Television
- Release: 15 August 2021 – 2 February 2025

The Newsreader is an Australian television drama series created by Michael Lucas and broadcast on ABC television, starring Anna Torv and Sam Reid. The show explored the personal and professional lives of the journalists and crew in a 1980s Australian newsroom.

The first season premiered on 15 August 2021 and became ABCTV's most-viewed drama program of that year. The second season premiered in September 2023. Each season was met with critical acclaim and received the most nominations of any show or film at the AACTA Awards in 2021 and 2023. The third and final season was released on 2 February 2025 on ABC iView.

== Premise ==
The Newsreader is set in the fast-paced world of commercial television news during the 1980s. The series follows ambitious young reporter Dale Jennings, who joins the national news programme News at Six and is unexpectedly paired with Helen Norville, the network's volatile but highly respected chief newsreader. As they work together to deliver nightly broadcasts, the show explores the pressures of live television, the competition within newsrooms, and the impact of major national and international events on journalists and their audiences.

Across the series, the partnership between Dale and Helen becomes central to the narrative. Their professional collaboration unfolds against a backdrop of newsroom politics, shifting media culture, and the personal challenges faced by those working in high-profile broadcast roles. The programme combines fictional characters with dramatised portrayals of real news events from the period, examining how television journalism shapes public understanding while also affecting the lives of the people who produce it.

== Cast and characters ==
=== Main ===
- Anna Torv, as Helen Norville, the first female newsreader of the ratings-dominant News at Six. She rises into the position in an era where pervasive misogyny and sexism create roadblocks in her career, especially as her fragile mental health begins to worsen. She charts a recovery journey by leaping head-first into a relationship with junior reporter Dale.
- Sam Reid, as Dale Jennings, initially a junior reporter for News at Six, whose ambition to anchor a bulletin leads him to become Helen’s producer. The two become romantically involved, attracting media attention, while Dale grows increasingly concerned that his private life and personal secrets may be exposed on screen.
- Robert Taylor, as Geoff Walters (series 1–2), the long-time co-anchor of News at Six, is critical of Helen’s role, viewing it as part of the news industry’s shift towards entertainment and glamour to retain viewers. Feeling sidelined as part of the old guard, Geoff allows his health to decline but remains determined to persevere and resist being pushed out.
- William McInnes, as Lindsay Cunningham, the overbearing, easily irascible, casually bigoted, and ratings-obsessed head of the News at Six newsroom.
- Marg Downey, as Evelyn Walters, Geoff's wife, who diligently manages his career behind the scenes, often to his irritation and in an underhand way of ensuring her future financial interests are protected.
- Stephen Peacocke, as Rob Rickards, the sports editor, and former VFL player, for News at Six who struggles when temporarily promoted to co-anchor/relief anchor. As his prominence grows, he often asks Noelene for help, and as he becomes attracted to her, he appreciates her more.
- Michelle Lim Davidson, as Noelene Kim (later Rickards), the assiduous News at Six library researcher and autocue operator, is determined to make her mark, despite being a put-upon, badly treated, and unduly pressured.
- Chum Ehelepola, as Dennis Tibb, the meticulously working and hot-headed head producer of the newsroom.
- Chai Hansen, as Tim Ahern, one of the News at Six cameramen who develops a partially-requited crush on Dale.
- Rory Fleck Byrne, as Gerry Carroll (series 2), an affably charming variety show host and one of the most popular personalities and comedians on television.
- Daniel Gillies, as Charlie Tate (series 2), the network's insidiously suave new CEO, is determined to steer the channel and its news division in a more informal direction with a specific brand.
- Philippa Northeast, as Kay Walters (series 2–3), Geoff and Evelyn's complicated, fashion-interested daughter, often rushes to her father in light of a strained relationship with her mother, with whom she is less able to exploit parental affection for her than Geoff's more unconditional approach.
- Daniel Henshall, as Bill McFarlane (series 3), Helen's producer at Seven who later becomes her co-executive producer on her show, Public Eye, and whose unrequited infatuation with her disrupts their working relationship.

=== Recurring ===
- Caroline Lee, as Jean Pascoe, the newsroom secretary with a keen but well-intended interest in – and keeps tabs on – the newsroom gossip.
- Maria Angelico, as Cheryl Ricci, the talkative and warmly brash News at Six make-up artist.
- John Leary, as Murray Gallagher, News at Six editor.
- Jackson Tozer, as Ross McGrath, the sound technician for Tim (series 1) and Brian (series 2).
- Rhys Mitchell, as Brian Mathers, News at Six Cameramen.
- Maude Davey, as Val Jennings, Dale's attentive and doting mother. She is keen to see her son do well and aware of his past traumas.
- Queenie van de Zandt, as Donna Gillies, a headstrong, wily, experienced gossip columnist for The Sun, is well known for her attempts to publish the private lives of the network's personalities and talent.
- Bert La Bonté, as Gordon (series 1), News at Six director and camera operator.
- Dom Phelan, as Brett (series 1), the other sports editor for News at Six.
- Meewon Yang as Soon-Hee Kim (series 1–3), Noelene's doting mother.
- Joe Cho as Byung-Ho Kim (series 1–3), Noelene's father, who is initially less-than-welcoming at Noelene's relationship with Rob.
- Edwina Wren, as Cathy O'Hare (series 1, 3), Helen's sister, whose pleas for Helen to reunite with her estranged family fall on deaf ears.
- Damian Callinan, as Frank (series 2–3), News at Six director and camera operator.
- Jane Harber, as Carla Carroll (series 2), Gerry's outgoing and openminded wife.
- Claire Boucher, as Eliza (series 2), Charlie's acquaintance.
- Cazz Bainbridge, as Marta (series 2), Charlie's mistreated housekeeper.
- Nick Simpson-Deeks, as Paul Stricker (series 2–3), a calculating, assiduous member of Geoff's production team.
- Dan Spielman, as Vincent Callahan (series 2–3), head of rival network Seven's newsroom, whom Dennis tries to poach and who later successfully poaches Helen.
- Hunter Page-Lochard, as Lynus Preston (series 2–3), a passionate activist leader who protests the Bicentennial celebrations on behalf of, and as a vocal member of Australia's Indigenous peoples.
- Paula Nazarski, as Aunty "Tiny" (series 2–3), an older member of Lynus' extended family and protest group who doesn't suffer fools gladly.
- Andrew McFarlane, as Richard Bertrand (series 3), the new network CEO whom Lindsay and Dennis relentlessly attempt to butter up, and later Dale and Rob appeal to for Lindsay's dismissal.
- Robin McLeavy, as Marcia Evans (series 3), a therapist and psychologist recommended to Helen, who explores her possible borderline personality disorder.
- Maria Theodorakis, as Leonie Briggs (series 3), headstrong, confident and stoic secretary at Public Eye.
- Grant Piro as Wayne (series 3), producer of Public Eye with whom Helen had worked with a decade prior.
- Tom Wilson as Nick (series 3), a male escort hired by Dale on several occasions.
- Yuchen Wang, as Lee Zheng (series 3), a reporter at a network in Hong Kong who became familiar, and later entered a relationship, with Tim.
- Somi Han and Ruby Roh, as Hana Rickards (series 3), Noelene and Rob's newborn daughter.

=== Notable guests ===
- Robert Grubb, as Dr McCormack (series 1), has Helen as one of his patients and regularly refills her sleeping pill prescription despite her increasingly flimsy excuses.
- Tony Rickards, as Dr Shaw (series 1), Geoff's doctor, meets resistance from both him and Evelyn about what changes Geoff must make to improve his health. His recommendations for a long while off-screen were not well-received.
- Tim Draxl, as Adam (series 1), a former school friend of Dale's, aims to apologise for a brutal event in their shared past.
- Asmara Feik, as Alison (series 2), Gerry and Carla's young daughter.
- Em Rusciano, as Rhonda (series 2), a singer hired for the News at Six's unnamed network's 1988 promo.
- Tony Briggs, as Uncle "Owie" (series 2), an older and more seasoned Aboriginal activist who clashes with Lynus on the best tactics for protesting the Bicentennial.
- Paula Arundell, as Nadia (series 2), a therapist at a private institution tries to encourage Geoff and Evelyn to involve themselves in Kay's recovery.
- Richard Davies, as Glen Rickards (series 2), Rob's gregarious brother and sports fanatic, partner to Kerrie.
- Nikki Shiels, as Kerrie Rickards (series 2), Rob's protective sister-in-law keen to inspect his girlfriends' qualities, expecting a child.
- Gillian Cosgriff, as Irene McFarlane (series 3), wife of Bill.
- Carolyn Bock as Ann Bertrand (series 3), wife of Richard.
- Clarence Ryan, as Deano Prince (series 3), an ex-VFL player who played with Rob in the 1970s, suffering racial abuse from fans and felt ostracised by his colleagues.
- Peta Brady, as Daniela Aranz (series 3), a former psychiatrist at a mental institution.
- Mark Mitchell, as Brian Mathers' father (series 3)
- Lewis Mitchell and Callum Mitchell, as Declan and Kieran Mathers (series 3), Brian Mathers' brothers.
- Catherine Glavcic, as Bev Gibson (series 3), executive at the News at Six's network who attempts to reimagine Dale's presentation in light of negative viewer feedback.
- Nick Farnell, as Greg 'Walshy' Walsh (series 3), Seven executive whose attempts to overinvolve himself with the running of Public Eye irritate Helen.

== Episodes ==
Series	Episodes	Originally released	
Series	Episodes	First released	Last released
1	6	15 August 2021	19 September 2021
2	6	10 September 2023	15 October 2023
3	6	2 February 2025	9 March 2025 (Note: All episodes were made available to view on ABC iView on 2 February 2025.)

=== Series 1 (2021) ===
No. overall	No. in series	Title	Directed by	Written by	News event covered	Original release date	Consolidated viewership
1	1	"Three, Two, One..."	Emma Freeman	Michael Lucas	Challenger launch	15 August 2021	1,244,000
2	2	"Once in a Lifetime"	Emma Freeman	Michael Lucas	Halley's Comet	22 August 2021	1,080,000
3	3	"The White Marquis Matinee Jacket"	Emma Freeman	Jonathan Gavin & Michael Lucas	Lindy Chamberlain release	29 August 2021	983,000
4	4	"A Step Closer to the Madness"	Emma Freeman	Niki Aken	Russell Street bombing	5 September 2021	1,032,000
5	5	"No More Lies"	Emma Freeman	Kim Ho & Michael Lucas	HIV/AIDS crisis / reporting	12 September 2021	990,000
6	6	"Meltdown"	Emma Freeman	Michael Lucas	Chernobyl disaster	19 September 2021	1,074,000

=== Series 2 (2023) ===
No. overall	No. in series	Title	Directed by	Written by	News event covered	Original release date	Consolidated viewership
7	1	"Decision '87"	Emma Freeman	Michael Lucas	1987 federal election	10 September 2023 (Note: This episode was first seen at an ACMI event in Melbourne on 8 September 2023.)	792,000
8	2	"People Like You and Me"	Emma Freeman	Kim Ho	Hoddle Street massacre	17 September 2023	731,000
9	3	"Greed and Fear"	Emma Freeman	Michael Lucas	Black Monday	24 September 2023 (Note: Episodes 3–6 were made available on ABC iView on 19 September 2023, prior to their respective linear broadcasts.)	615,000
10	4	"The Hungry Truth"	Emma Freeman	Adrian Russell Wills	Bicentennial protests / Diana/Charles 'separation'	1 October 2023	540,000
11	5	"A Model Daughter"	Emma Freeman	Niki Aken	Heroin crisis	8 October 2023	524,000
12	6	"Fireworks"	Emma Freeman	Michael Lucas	Australian Bicentenary	15 October 2023	513,000

=== Series 3 (2025) ===
All episodes were made available on ABC iView prior to linear broadcast; on the morning of 2 February 2025, the series' premiere date.

No. overall	No. in series	Title	Directed by	Written by	News event covered	Original release date	Consolidated viewership
13	1	"Night of Nights"	Emma Freeman	Michael Lucas	Lockerbie disaster 1989 Logies	2 February 2025 (Note: This episode was first seen at an ACMI event in Melbourne on 31 January 2025.)	644,000
14	2	"A New Era"	Emma Freeman	Michael Lucas	Exxon Valdez oil spill Bob Hawke infidelity rumours	9 February 2025	486,000
15	3	"Behind the Front Line"	Emma Freeman	Christine Bartlett	Tiananmen Square massacre	16 February 2025	458,000
16	4	"One Team, All Brothers"	Emma Freeman	Adrian Russell Wills; Michael Lucas	Sporting boycott of South Africa	23 February 2025	393,000
17	5	"On the Brink"	Emma Freeman	Niki Aken; Michael Lucas	Mental health system reform	2 March 2025	406,000
18	6	"The Fall"	Emma Freeman	Michael Lucas	Fall of the Berlin Wall	9 March 2025	400,000

== Production ==
The series was created by Michael Lucas and Joanna Werner and directed by Emma Freeman. Filmed in Melbourne, the series was written by Michael Lucas, Jonathan Gavin, Niki Aken and Kim Ho. Joanna Werner and Stuart Menzies, along with Brett Sleigh and Sally Riley on behalf of the ABC, executive produced the series. The series was supported through investments from Screen Australia and Film Victoria.

=== Development ===
Lucas began working on what would become The Newsreader around 2015, during his work on Party Tricks and the fifth series of Offspring. Initially, it was not based around a newsroom setting, and the series was instead built upon a male and female lead that represented the flipping of gender stereotypes; a male lead "desperate to live up to [...] a particular version of masculinity" that "wasn't an actual fit" for him", and a female character required to match and contrast this male character with, who would comprise "those traditional masculine qualities" instead. The 1980s and newsroom setting was decided upon later, which Lucas concluded both elicited and compelled "more pressure on [both characters] to fulfil certain roles", with the masculine qualities of a newsreader juxtaposed against the misogyny of the 1980s that "punished" women that held them. Lucas' research into newsrooms of the 1980s over 2015 and 2016 – which included spending time interviewing those who worked in them at thetime – found that female newsreaders were caught in an "era of change", in how to present themselves and "look in a workplace" and industry dominated, and influenced by how "viewers liked the news [being] read" by, "very masculine voices of God". He undertook an assiduous and mammoth task of reading "nearly every newspaper from 1986", with a particular focus on letters to the editor, which Lucas claimed "give you the full picture of what people were making of things then".

The first iteration of The Newsreader was written on spec; Lucas approached the ABC – having previously worked with them on sitcom Rosehaven – with the script of a pilot. ABC responded positively "really quickly", and Lucas boasted of their extensive archive of news footage that could be utilised. Brett Sleigh of ABC, who would become an executive producer of the series, suggested using real-life events as the structure of the series – instead of basing it around "generic stories" like the more expansive rollout of ATMs – as he was keen to "make the most of ABC archives"; he recommended Joanna Werner to Lucas, who became "really connected" with the draft pilot script. Of this new direction, Lucas was clear from the start that it would begin with the Challenger explosion, claiming it was the first major news event he remembered from childhood; for the rest of the series, he simply looked at major news events of the first half of 1986, those with fixed dates that were unavoidable but also less "date-specific" stories of issues prevalent in society at the time that could be slotted in anywhere, and enabled Lucas greater creative control that news stories with set dates to operate in and around did not afford him. A decision was taken to "tightly stick to a real-life timeframe" with episodes taking place across a few days at most. Crew received tapes of broadcast news bulletins from certain days to better judge how to prioritise certain news stories on the days episodes took place on. Lucas described the process of weaving real-life events in with "pure fiction" as both "maddening" but also a "fun puzzle". When Lucas established a writers' room in 2017 – composed of those Lucas knew would provide valuable assistance in developing the programme (such as Niki Aken, who came from a research background), but also carrying on a practice he had used on other shows he had worked on, and hiring emerging talent (Kim Ho) – the team were "bouncing back and forth" evaluating how character arcs fit into the way in which real-life events were depicted in the show. Before the writing of each episode, research and archive footage was "locked in" before writing progressed onto working out these character arcs; it meant that when writing began, a "comprehensive outline of the factual events involved would already be in place" for the writer(s) to work around. The "emotional arcs and storylines" were less set in stone throughout episode production, with amendments to their depiction even taking place as late as the post-production edit.

Of the second series, Lucas said that events remained chosen and placed throughout the series according to whether they were grounded by certain dates or not – "a balance of really date-specific things with a couple of broader arc '80s news stories". An episode on the heroin crisis, for example, was able to be placed anywhere within the series, Lucas commenting that he had "a little bit of leeway to put that story at an appropriate time for our cast of characters". Additionally, the nascence of current affairs shows and TV journalists "becom[ing] brands themselves" at the time is explored in the second series, with the character of Geoff hosting his own eponymous current affairs show a deliberate attempt at this, with Lucas and producer Werner having read several memoirs of journalists from the era. Lucas recalled that figures who had previously worked in the industry during the temporal setting of the series had written into the production company in light of the first series to "directly ask" if characters were based on them.

Securing international interest for the series was laden with pitfalls at first. Prospective distributors were interested at the scripts, but the temporal and "Australian specificity" of the series was a key sticking point. This caused Lucas to be "conscious of picking stories that have some international resonance", such as the Azaria Chamberlain case that was infamous within Australia and well-known abroad even decades on. Werner spoke of how the accuracy with which the 1980s setting was depicted on screen was important for foreign "partners involved" in the series; "we wanted to look like [it was] made in the '80s – not a show made about the '80s", which necessitated cameras for filming being fitted with vintage lenses.

The series' commission was announced in April 2020, entered pre-production by October, with the casting announced that November; six episodes were ordered by the ABC, despite the series being originally developed for eight. In March 2022, the ABC confirmed that The Newsreader had been renewed for a second series, to be set in 1987. A third series was announced within two weeks of the second premiering in September 2023, later confirmed as the final. Lucas clarified that "you always tend to think dramatically in terms of three acts", and had done so with the characters of Helen and Dale.

=== Casting and characterisation ===
Marg Downey was at first bemused when asked to audition for the role of Evelyn, but reacted more positively when receiving the script, having been very aware throughout her life of the type of women who are surreptitiously manipulative and are the "power behind the throne". Michelle Lim Davidson recounted how the role of Noelene was adapted for her, but nonetheless felt apprehensive about it; she was concerned about whether Australian television was open to the representation she would bring – that of "the first Korean Aus[tralian] woman in a major drama on Aus[tralian] TV". She praised the attention to detail of the arts department in representation of the aspects of Korean culture featured on the show, and that the show had helped assuage her concerns of not being "able to find a safe space ... in the industry" to express more of the Korean aspects of her Korean-Australian identity, as well as given her hopes her portrayal may lead to expanding Korean representation on Australian television.

Anna Torv accepted the role of Helen Norville upon receiving the scripts for the first two episodes, and was cast in early 2020. Her approach to the role evolved over time, learning to appreciate the journalistic background her character would have and how it would influence how Helen in the position of 'newsreader'; nevertheless, she touched upon how the role of a journalist/reporter and that of a newsreader are different in the way in which a character comports themselves. Sam Reid commented on this regarding his role as Dale; he collaborated with director Freeman to develop a style for Dale as a newreader, which centred around the "public and private mask" that is prevalent in newsreading, as it requires a "blank personality". Reid commented on the similarities between this and the private life of the character of Dale, the version of the character's self achieved through such employment helping him attain the version of himself that consists of the "model of masculinity" Dale has been desperate to inhabit, and in the process begins to replace himself with a "carbon copy of a man [he isn't] that good at [being]". Torv described her portrayal as an "amalgamation" of the female newsreaders she grew up watching – and later re-watched in research for the role – and that the opportunity to be given lessons on how to read autocues were pivotal. She also acclaimed the experience of working with creator Lucas, producer Werner and director Freeman, and specifically how open they all were and the environment of collaboration and improvisation that was consequently fomented. Torv commented that "[m]aking The Newsreader was one of the most satisfying and joyous creative experiences that [she had] ever had". Torv also revealed that the ending of the series was not known from the beginning of production, and that the cast were only aware of the show's general direction for a time.

The ensemble cast expanded in the second series, with Daniel Gillies, Philippa Northeast, and Rory Fleck Byrne joining the cast for major roles. Additionally, it was also confirmed that there would be a further expansion of the cast with an introduction to extended family members of the main ensemble. The major roles played were not elaborated until a year after casting was confirmed, once a lengthy trailer for the second series was published; it was revealed what roles the new members of the supporting cast would play: Gillies as the new network CEO, Northeast as Geoff and Evelyn's 'complex' daughter Kay, Fleck Byrne as 'superstar variety host' Gerry, and the previously unannounced addition of Hunter Page-Lochard to the series' supporting cast as 'firebrand activist' Lynus. It was also confirmed that the entire ensemble from the first series would be returning, albeit Chai Hansen made significantly fewer appearances as Tim Ahern due to the actor's commitments to Amazon Prime Video series Night Sky. The character of Lynus is "heavily based on real figures behind" the Bicentennial protests at the time, with writer Adrian Russell Wills clarifying that he drew large influence for the character from his own activist brother. Em Rusciano, colleague of Lucas, made a singing cameo in the opening scene to the fourth episode, as did several current Australian TV journalists (namely ABC meteorologist Nate Byrne, Network 10 reporter Daniel Doody, and radio sports commentator Megan Hustwaite). Multiple casting calls were made throughout mid-2022 for extras for scenes with relatively sizeable crowds.

Russell Wills, the Aboriginal writer of the fourth episode, spoke of the significance of the opportunity to do so. In basing the character of activist Lynus on his brother, he expressed that while his brother did his "marching" and "protest" physically and with passionate volume, he did it "through writing and to be able to put it into an episode like this on a show that has such a fantastic following". He deliberately wrote Helen in a way that bridged the gap between the "fervor" in the expression of the Aboriginal community and an audience that may be repelled by the level of "anger and the passion [which] can often turn people off or make people switch off" – a rare and "unique" way of framing what is "often not allowed in the media" – and voiced his hopes that The Newsreader's audience was thus able to relate to the struggles of Aborigines through Helen and even "relate to Lynus" as if he were a family member, having found this happen with the white audience of his previous work on Redfern Now. Lucas spoke of the coincidence that the episode aired concurrent to the campaign period for the ultimately unsuccessful referendum on establishing further rights for Indigenous Australians in the constitution, polling day for which was held the day before the series' final episode was broadcast. Lucas commented Russell Wills' 2014 documentary 88 on the Bicentennial protests was an "invaluable resource" for production of the fourth episode.

==== Cast input and involvement ====
Lucas and director Emma Freeman spoke of how the show is a collaborative endeavour, not just between themselves but also with the cast. Creator Lucas and director Freeman worked closely and collaboratively on- and off-set, with clear roles set out for the two; during the writing process, Freeman provides Lucas with notes on the script from cast and other crew, and during her directing, he acts as "a support" for her on set. Lucas described Freeman as the "prime storyteller" on set, his presence to "help with speedbumps with the script or to troubleshoot". He later said that, the way in which he engages in constant communication with other cast members, with their input, during the process of writing and filming, that the series was a "mutual creation". Freeman commented it was a "special project" as the cast and her – as the director – were "so aligned", meaning it is an "incredibly collaborative show", with Reid and Torv "help[ing to] develop the script on the floor". Her method of directing is controlled by the "want to capture energy on set" before "finessing in cut", because trying to set-up and control the energy of a scene in post-production comes across "forced". She admitted it was "not a terribly cutty show", which was important to her as "you want to really preserve the natural energy of, in particular, Helen and Dale".

With regards to backstories for characters that may not be directly written into the show but are used to generate context for the cast as to their characters' behaviours, mannerisms, and beliefs, Lucas said that does not share backstories he has in mind for characters unless they ask, as part of an actor's process is "to build their own one based off the script". He spoke of at least Reid and Torv who have added to, or "heightened details" of their characters, with assistance from Freeman. Torv spoke of how it "alternates with all work" on the extent to which a character's backstory is seen as significant, and said she and Lucas "d⁯id have a chat" to discuss Helen's past. When asked about how much effort they put into their characters' backstories, Lim Davidson said "[t]he entire team have done a lot of research", and they "start quite broadly, especially for a character like Noelene", who is only afforded limited time in the series due to being a less prominent main character and so only "a certain amount of time to ... reveal parts of her life". Nevertheless, it was something she took "very seriously because I feel a lot of responsibility to bring the most authentic version of this character to screen", and that "whenever you're trying to merge a cultural heritage that you're not used to seeing on Australian television, you have extra responsibility and you need to respect the people from that time period and do your best to bring it to life". McInnes, in contrast, said he "didn't see any point in going down that route because it's just there on the paper", and that "sometimes you just have to know what's required of you to make the scene work", but admitted "both ways are just as ... appropriate" and "you've gotta know what suits".

The cast spoke following the second series' broadcast of the level of input they were able to make to the series, with varying levels of improvisation and drawing experiences from their own lives into their characters, dependent on when cast believed it could accentuate the plot. Lim Davidson recounted how she inadvertently inhabited the role of her character's lower status within the show's main ensemble to the extent it influenced her performance and line delivery, with Torv on one occasion altering the script – to Lucas' delight – while McInnes and Downey spoke of their proclivity to stick to it. Director Freeman also had a hand in such extemporaneous performances, including ensuring that part of a scene in the second episode was kept secret from some of the cast involved, and for directly allowing cast unalloyed freedom to behave as they believed their characters might during the Christmas party scene in the fifth episode.

An intimacy coordinator was utilised during the second series, to mould lines and the performances – and to "ensure [it was] period accurate" – between the characters of Dale and Gerry regarding the former's sexuality in the third episode. Lim Davidson was spoken of as being integral to the way her character was dressed at some parts of the series. Notably, a salmon pantsuit worn by her character in the third episode was not in the original script and was "a collaboration of ideas" between her, Freeman and Lucas prior to shooting – as to how the character should respond in a storyline that would convince her character to impress as more professional – as well as with influence from the second series' costume designer, to place it as accurate both temporally and to the established sartorial tendencies of the character.

=== Filming ===
The first series was filmed over 54 shoot days during late 2020 and early 2021, under COVID-19 restrictions. As a result, plans for expansive location filming could not take place to the extent desired. Notable aspects from the filming of the first series included the shooting of scenes in the aftermath of the Russell Street bombing being at the site of the attack itself, and Lucas himself cameoing in one episode in an experience which he stated allowed him to get to know the cast better. Filming of the News at Six studio was done at the NEP Studios in Southbank, South Melbourne, with the newsroom offices set in a disused chemical warehouse/factory in Brooklyn, west of Melbourne. Delbridge House was used as the setting for Norville's home.

In September 2021, before the first series was broadcast, when speaking about the prospect of a second series, Lucas claimed that he wanted to have sourced the required archive footage before starting writing, and how the ABC's archives team had been proactive in doing this so he was already "sitting on a goldmine", and "brainstorming ideas [to be] ready when the time comes". Lucas later revealed that development of the second series was commissioned by the ABC prior to the broadcast of the first, which gave him "time to imagine what I wanted and what the team wanted without knowing how people were going to respond", which he found "liberating" in that "you know who you're writing for", and he had the "ensemble's voices in [his] head". Reid spoke of how Lucas and Freeman devised a booklet that was given to cast members at the start of production of the second series, which outlined and detailed the events from 1987 and 1988 that would be featured in the series, to provide background to members of the cast who were not familiar with the news stories the series would cover.

Production and filming began in Melbourne in July 2022, as announced during the March 2022 announcement of the series 2 order. Filming for the second series lasted 56 days, over 11 weeks and ended in late September 2022. Location filming was prioritised; this resulted in a scene in the final, sixth episode being one of the first to be filmed, influencing how Freeman viewed the overall arc of the series. The newsdesk studio scenes were filmed back-to-back during the eight week, which Freeman called the "documentary approach to filmmaking" and claimed helped them come across as more "cinematic"; Lucas praised how this style of filming being deployed during the first series as the reason why he chose to start the series with an episode regarding the 1987 federal election. The newsdesk scenes were shot using "full cinematic cameras" alongside "old Betacam cameras" – a mix of vintage and new technology – so as to render the footage resembling television of the 1980s. Lucas said that it was essentially a "functional newsdesk set". In mid-April 2023, the final mastering session on the sixth and last episode took place, ending post-production for the second series. Lucas revealed that the original cut of the sixth episode was "about 84 minutes", having to cut it down to an hour being "one of the agonies about the series".

The use of archive footage expanded and evolved in the second series. The first episode used footage from an episode of Four Corners, specifically an interview with then-Finance Minister Paul Keating, in a way that it came across as the character of Helen was conducting the interview herself; this technique – of melding archival footage with newly-recorded – was something Lucas had previously mentioned in a pre-series interview he had hoped to utilise. Permission was not sought from Keating, but was required from Kylie Minogue for archival footage later in the series.

Pre-production of the third series began in December 2023 with cast table reads, before filming began in January 2024; notably at the Neighbours studios on the outskirts of Melbourne's CBD. Filming concluded in March, after 56 shoot days.

=== Historical accuracy ===
ABC News' Matt Neal wrote about the level of historical accuracy attained by each episode of the series throughout its run. Of the first and second series, he generally praised their attention to detail, with most inaccuracies found were based on the series changing the dates of certain news events for purposes of dramatisation, such as the timing of Halley's Comet and Prince Andrew and Sarah Ferguson's nuptials in the first series; in the second series, the timing of Prince Charles and Princess Diana's German royal visit and the route of the First Fleet reenactment; additionally, he pointed out dialogue that prematurely elevated Aboriginal celebrity Ernie Dingo to a higher status of celebrity than was period accurate. Lucas wrote separately that the idea of the News at Six's election coverage possessing a specific time of their calling of the result was influenced by the real-life Eyewitness News also making a promise to viewers along the same line.

The show's costume, hair and makeup designers have spoken of the meticulous work put into ensuring those aspects of the characters were period accurate. John Logue, hair and makeup artist of the series, was aided by he himself having been employed as such for actual newsreaders during the era the show is set in. Costume designer Zed Dragojlvoich reported that "quite often we collect things in costume" that are not worn but are kept as "references", and there was some difficulty in that many clothes that were produced and available during the 1980s nevertheless "looked too contemporary" with features that now look "fashionable". He also spoke of there being a different method for each character in finding outfits that seemed right for them, clothing that "continu[ed] the DNA of that character" and protected, rather than caused the loss of, the "essence" of the characters.

== Release and international distribution ==
=== Australia ===
In July 2021, the first trailer was released for the series. The series was broadcast on ABC, premiering on 15 August 2021. Alongside, and in the run-up to, the series' launch, the ABC released videos on YouTube and across social media interviewing cast and crew about the specific news events that would be covered in the series.

In August 2023, the date of the launch of the second series was announced, as was that episodes for this series would be also accompanied by the official The Newsreader Podcast, made available online following each episode; hosted by Leigh Sales and Lisa Millar, they were teased as to feature insights into the actual lives of journalists working in newsrooms in the 1980s, as well as 'never-before-heard stories from the writers room', cast interviews and 'gossip from the set'. Both Torv and Reid were given clearance to promote the series during the various actors' and writers' strikes in the United States happening at the time. On 8 September 2023, the first episode of the series premiered at an event at the Australian Centre for the Moving Image (ACMI) in Melbourne, co-hosted by ABC, and was followed by a Q&A session with cast and crew. On 19 September 2023, all episodes yet to air (episodes 3–6) were made available on ABC iView, on-demand, prior to their linear broadcast.

=== International ===
Entertainment One acquired international distribution rights to The Newsreader in late 2020, and has sold broadcast or streaming rights to the series to Arte in France and Germany, the BBC in the UK, Cosmo in Spain, Filmin in Portugal and Spain, NBCUniversal International Networks in Latin America, Now TV in Hong Kong, RTÉ in Ireland, The Roku Channel in the United States, Telus Presents in Canada, and Viaplay in Poland, the Netherlands and the Nordic and Baltic regions.

In March 2022, the series launched on the Roku Channel in the United States, but was removed in September 2023, as part of several cost-cutting measures, in this case a move by the streaming service to render unavailable shows that had not been sufficiently popular beyond their initial launch. At some point prior to September 2024, the English version of Arte made the series available to US viewers until mid-November 2024. In December 2024, AMC+ and SundanceNow acquired the streaming rights to the show, following Sam Reid’s role in AMC’s Interview with the Vampire. The second series made its US premiere on AMC+ on August 7, 2025.

Also in March 2022, the programme's Brazilian premiere took place on Universal TV, in New Zealand on Eden and on-demand platform ThreeNow, and in Spain on Canal COSMO, as part of its Women's Month programming. The second series premiered in New Zealand and Spain in September and November 2023 respectively.

The series's premiere in Mexico in May 2022 – on premium channel Universal Premiere and paid on-demand platforms – was commemorated with a special event that highlighted the contribution made towards gender equality "in and out of the newsroom", attended by many senior female Mexican journalists, in collaboration with Universal TV.

In Ireland, the series is shown on RTÉ2 and also available on-demand on RTÉ Player. The first series premiered in June 2022, with the second launching in September 2023. In the United Kingdom, the show was acquired by the BBC, with the first series premiering in August 2022, followed by the second in December 2023. Episodes received a linear broadcast on BBC Two, and were available on-demand via BBC iPlayer on the date the first episodes of each series were first shown.

The series was first made available in France and Germany by Arte in January 2023.

The second series premiered in Latin America on Universal Plus on 6 November, and on Viaplay internationally on 15 November.

== Reception ==
=== Viewership ===
Rating averages (Australia; millions of viewers) Overnight ratings for series 1 exclude on-demand viewership, known as BVOD. For series 2 and 3, on-demand viewership before linear broadcast is excluded from reported numbers, hence the listed numbers are artificially low.
Series	Year broadcast	Metro				Total/National					
Series	Year broadcast	Overnights	Rank	Consolidated	Rank	Overnights (excl. BVOD)	Rank	Overnights (incl. BVOD)	Rank	Consolidated	Rank
1	2021	0.460	11	0.750	—	0.685	10	—	—	1.067	—
2	2023	0.289	10	0.440	8	0.408	11	0.430	12	0.619	9
3	2025	Metric deprecated (Note: Between the second and third series, delivery and publication of ratings measurements was fundamentally changed in Australia. Ratings in the metropolitan areas are no longer separately recorded, with a changed focus onto the number of viewers a program has reached (i.e. those who have watched at least 15 seconds or 60 seconds of a program, on-demand or on linear TV respectively); these figures are not reported here.)				0.333	16	0.350	16	0.465	13

The Newsreader was the fourth-most-watched Australian free-to-air adult drama series in 2021, and was the ABC's most-watched drama programme of 2021 – with the network reporting it achieved an average audience of 1.5 million viewers across linear and on-demand platforms – as well as its highest-rated new drama premiere of the year in the 25-54 age demographic.

In the United Kingdom, the series was made available from July 2022; broadcast on free-to-air channel BBC2 and on-demand through BBC iPlayer, with the vast majority of viewership from the latter. The first series was the most-watched new series across on-demand/streaming services of the public service broadcasters in the UK in the week post-launch, with each episode more-than-doubling its viewership within a week of linear broadcast. Within a day of the second series launching in November 2023, the programme was ranked among iPlayer's top ten most popular shows, and remained in the top 40 for the following week.

=== Critical response ===
The show has been generally critically praised. For the first season, the review aggregator website Rotten Tomatoes reported a 100% approval rating based on 19 critic reviews, the website's consensus reads, "An engrossing recreation of the 1980s television beat, The Newsreader mines authentic drama and laughs thanks to its verisimilitude and a commanding Anna Torv." For the second season, the review aggregator website Rotten Tomatoes reported a 100% approval rating based on 6 critic reviews.

Sinead Stubbins of The Sydney Morning Herald – in a review of both the first and second series – proclaimed that The Newsreader was "the slick, addictive and excellent local drama that might be the best show Australia has produced in years", praising "the determination to use historical events and attitudes to illuminate something about our present" and how the show "uses ... huge world events cleverly ... they aren't just dumped in the middle of an episode", and "though there are occasional cute moments, [they] are woven into the lives of these reporters". She added that while there was "a certain safety in covering current issues through a historical lens", the show "particularly excels at when it comes to homophobia and racism in the workplace". Karl Quinn, in a five-star review for The Sydney Morning Herald, called the series "brilliant" and a "terrific ensemble piece", "beautifully handled by director Emma Freeman" with "incisive, empathetic and funny scripts" by Lucas, concluding it was "the most fun [he'd] had watching telly in a long time." David Free, also in The Sydney Morning Herald, commented it was "the best show [he'd] seen in yonks", lavishing praise on the attention-to-detail in the series, in the clothes, language and propwork. However, Marama Whyte, in an article for History Australia journal, wrote that such details were relatively facile, and that "the period setting is style without much substance", as "[i]t wants the shoulder pads and typewriters, without engaging with the fact that this was an industry on the cusp of colossal change."

The Guardian Australia's Luke Buckmaster placed the series ninth in his top 10 Australian TV shows of 2021, and praised Torv and Reid in "deliver[ing] fine performances as characters you want to keep spending time with" while complimenting the cinematography and the use of "real-life media stories as the scaffolding for character-related fiction, the former complimenting the latter". Nevertheless, he critiqued the extent of its commentary on the industry it was depicting, and specifically the way it depicted how people of colour worked within it, saying the show "evok[ed] a feeling that some of the rough edges of history have been smoothed". Helen Vatsikopoulos in The Canberra Times, who worked as a journalist during The Newsreader's temporal setting, also observed that newsrooms of the era "were not as diverse as the programme pretends". Despite this, Helen Hawkins of The Arts Desk also noted the diversity of ethnic and cultural backgrounds of some of the characters, but called it "a mini melting pot that allows the script to probe the unattractive hidden currents of Australian corporate life", and that a strength of the show is "the unshowy way it goes about stirring this pot".

Rachel Aroesti from The Guardian acclaimed the way in which the show represented various sides of the industry, and that it "is excellent at capturing the weird, restrained elation that a large-scale tragedy can bring to a newsroom ... and neatly sums up something decidedly murky about journalism in the process". She separately lamented what she felt as Torv and her character not being given the focus deserved, a view shared by James Croot for New Zealand's Stuff; he claimed it was "really Torv's ... show" and "she delivers a performance of power, grit and authority that her more illustrious countrywoman [sic] would be proud of."

==== Response ====
After several reviews accused The Newsreader of depicting a newsroom with greater diversity and minority representation than in reality at the time, Chum Ehelepola wrote on Instagram "that is [not] a failing of the show", but rather "a failing of the times". Ahead of the second series, Ehelepola praised his being cast in the role, as it "allows the show to talk to how backward we were at that time, and the fact that a person [like Dennis] wouldn't be there, not because he wasn't skilled, but because of his skin colour", and to prompt questions over what "our governments", "our boardrooms" and "our CEOs look like", both then and contemporarily. Ehelepola recalled a conversation with a Disney executive during the time he worked for the company, in which it was explained that the company featuring diversity in content they produced was not "social responsibility" but rather to engender "fantastic economics", as a show featuring an all-white cast would be difficult to attract international sales for. Satirist Mitch McTaggart, of The Last Year of Television, argued that "a show made in 2023 [...] shouldn't need to be held to a subjective casting expectation of another period, real or imagined".

=== Awards ===
At both the 11th AACTA Awards, and the 13th AACTA Awards, the show was nominated for more awards than any other program.

Year	Award	Category	Nominee	Result	Ref
2026	AWGIE Awards	Television – Series	Christine Bartlett ("Behind the Front Line")	Nominated	
2026	15th AACTA Awards	Best Drama Series	The Newsreader	Won	
2026	15th AACTA Awards	Best Lead Actress in a Drama	Anna Torv	Won	
2026	15th AACTA Awards	Best Lead Actor in a Drama	Sam Reid	Nominated	
2026	15th AACTA Awards	Best Supporting Actress in a Drama	Michelle Lim Davidson	Nominated	
2026	15th AACTA Awards	Best Supporting Actor in a Drama	Daniel Henshall	Won	
2026	15th AACTA Awards	Best Direction in Drama or Comedy	Emma Freeman – Episode 3	Nominated	
2026	15th AACTA Awards	Best Screenplay in Television	Michael Lucas – Episode 6	Won	
2026	15th AACTA Awards	Best Cinematography in Television	Earle Dresner – Episode 3	Nominated	
2026	15th AACTA Awards	Best Costume Design in Television	Gypsy Taylor – Episode 3	Nominated	
2026	15th AACTA Awards	Best Editing in Television	Julie-Anne De Ruvo – Episode 6	Nominated	
2026	15th AACTA Awards	Best Production Design in Television	Paddy Reardon – Episode 3	Nominated	
2026	15th AACTA Awards	Best Casting in Television	Nathan LLoyd	Nominated	
2025	2025 Logie Awards	Best Supporting Actress	Michelle Lim Davidson	Nominated	
2025	2025 Logie Awards	Best Supporting Actress	Marg Downey	Nominated	
2025	2025 Logie Awards	Best Drama Program	The Newsreader	Nominated	
2024	2024 International Emmy Awards	Best Drama Series	The Newsreader	Nominated	
2024	2024 Logie Awards	Best Drama Program	The Newsreader	Nominated	
2024	2024 Logie Awards	Best Lead Actor in a Drama	Sam Reid	Nominated	
2024	2024 Logie Awards	Best Lead Actress in a Drama	Anna Torv	Nominated	
2024	2024 Logie Awards	Best Supporting Actress	Michelle Lim Davidson	Nominated	
2024	Banff World Media Festival Rockie Awards International Program Competition	Scripted – Drama Series: English Language	The Newsreader – Werner Film Productions, Australian Broadcasting Corporation, eOne	Nominated	
2024	Screen Producers Awards 2024	Drama Series Production of the Year	The Newsreader S2 – Werner Film Productions	Won	
2024	13th AACTA Awards	Best Drama Series	The Newsreader – Joanna Werner, Michael Lucas – Werner Film Productions (ABC)	Won	
2024	13th AACTA Awards	Best Lead Actor – Drama	Sam Reid	Nominated	
2024	13th AACTA Awards	Best Lead Actress – Drama	Anna Torv	Won	
2024	13th AACTA Awards	Best Supporting Actor – Drama	William McInnes	Nominated	
2024	13th AACTA Awards	Best Supporting Actor – Drama	Hunter Page-Lochard	Won	
2024	13th AACTA Awards	Best Supporting Actress – Drama	Michelle Lim Davidson	Nominated	
2024	13th AACTA Awards	Best Supporting Actress – Drama	Marg Downey	Nominated	
2024	13th AACTA Awards	Best Screenplay in Television	Adrian Russell Wills – Episode 4: The Hungry Truth	Nominated	
2024	13th AACTA Awards	Best Direction in a Drama or Comedy	Emma Freeman – Episode 4: The Hungry Truth	Won	
2024	13th AACTA Awards	Best Cinematography in Television	Earle Dresner – Episode 4: The Hungry Truth	Nominated	
2024	13th AACTA Awards	Best Editing in Television	Angie Higgins – Episode 4: The Hungry Truth	Nominated	
2024	13th AACTA Awards	Best Sound in Television	Nick Godkin, Ralph Ortner, Lee Yee, Liesl Pieterse – Episode 6: Fireworks	Nominated	
2024	13th AACTA Awards	Best Production Design in Television	Paddy Reardon – Episode 4: The Hungry Truth	Nominated	
2024	13th AACTA Awards	Best Costume Design in Television	Zed Dragojlovich – Episode 4: The Hungry Truth	Won	
2024	13th AACTA Awards	Best Casting	Nathan Lloyd	Nominated	
2024	AWGIE Awards	Best Script for Television – Series	Kim Ho – "People Like You and Me"	Nominated	
2023	Australian Directors Guild Awards	Best Direction in a TV or SVOD Drama Series Episode	Emma Freeman – The Newsreader (series 2)	Won	
2023	C21 Media International Drama Awards	Best Returning Drama Series	The Newsreader – produced by: Werner Film Productions, for: ABC Australia, distributed by: Entertainment One	Nominated	
2022	Australian Directors Guild Awards	Best Direction in a TV or SVOD Drama Series Episode	Emma Freeman – "The Newsreader, Episode 1 – Three, Two, One..."	Won	
2022	AWGIE Awards	Best Script for Television – Series	Niki Aken – "A Step Closer to the Madness"	Nominated	
2022	AWGIE Awards	Best Script for Television – Series	Kim Ho and Michael Lucas – "No More Lies"	Won	
2022	2022 MEAA Equity Ensemble Awards	Outstanding Performance by an Ensemble in a Drama Series 2022	The Newsreader – Anna Torv, Sam Reid, Robert Taylor, William McInnes, Michelle Lim Davidson, Chum Ehelepola, Stephen Peacocke, Marg Downey, Chai Hansen, Maude Davey, Jackson Tozer, Maria Angelico	Won	
2022	2022 Logie Awards	Most Outstanding Drama Series	The Newsreader	Won	
2022	2022 Logie Awards	Most Popular Drama Program	The Newsreader	Nominated	
2022	2022 Logie Awards	Most Outstanding Actress	Anna Torv	Won	
2022	2022 Logie Awards	Most Popular Actress	Anna Torv	Nominated	
2022	2022 Logie Awards	Most Outstanding Actor	Sam Reid	Nominated	
2022	2022 Logie Awards	Most Outstanding Supporting Actor	William McInnes	Nominated	
2022	2022 SPA Awards	Drama Series Production of the Year	The Newsreader	Won	
2021	11th AACTA Awards	Best Television Drama Series	The Newsreader – Joanna Werner & Michael Lucas (ABC)	Won	
2021	11th AACTA Awards	Best Lead Actor – Drama	Sam Reid	Nominated	
2021	11th AACTA Awards	Best Lead Actress – Drama	Anna Torv	Won	
2021	11th AACTA Awards	Best Guest or Supporting Actor – Drama	William McInnes	Won	
2021	11th AACTA Awards	Best Guest or Supporting Actor – Drama	Stephen Peacocke	Nominated	
2021	11th AACTA Awards	Best Guest or Supporting Actress – Drama	Michelle Lim Davidson	Nominated	
2021	11th AACTA Awards	Best Guest or Supporting Actress – Drama	Marg Downey	Nominated	
2021	11th AACTA Awards	Best Screenplay	Michael Lucas – Episode 1: Three, Two, One...	Nominated	
2021	11th AACTA Awards	Best Screenplay	Kim Ho & Michael Lucas – Episode 5: No More Lies	Nominated	
2021	11th AACTA Awards	Best Direction in a Drama or Comedy	Emma Freeman – Episode 1: Three, Two, One...	Won	
2021	11th AACTA Awards	Best Cinematography in Television	Earle Dresner – Episode 1: Three, Two, One...	Nominated	
2021	11th AACTA Awards	Best Editing in Television	Angie Higgins – Episode 5: No More Lies	Nominated	
2021	11th AACTA Awards	Best Sound in Television	Nick Godkin – Episode 1: Three, Two, One	Nominated	
2021	11th AACTA Awards	Best Production Design in Television	Melinda Doring – Episode 1: Three, Two, One...	Won	
2021	11th AACTA Awards	Best Costume Design in Television	Marion Boyce – Episode 1: Three, Two, One...	Nominated	
2021	11th AACTA Awards	Best Casting	Nathan Lloyd	Nominated	
2021	2021 TV Blackbox Awards	Most Popular Australian Drama	The Newsreader	Won	
2021	2021 TV Blackbox Awards	Most Popular Actor	Anna Torv (for both The Newsreader and Fires)	Nominated	
2021	2021 TV Blackbox Awards	Most Popular Actor	Stephen Peacocke (for The Newsreader, RFDS and Five Bedrooms)	Nominated	
2021	2021 Casting Guild Awards	Best Casting in a TV Drama, TV Miniseries and Telemovie	Nathan Lloyd	Won	
