= Kim Ho (writer) =

Australian writer, performer and dramaturg

- Born: Sydney, Australia
- Occupation: Filmmaker, Writer, and Playwright
- Genre: Magic Realism, Cross-Cultural Encounters
- Notable works: The Language of Love
- Notable awards: Patrick White Playwrights’ Award the Queensland Premier’s Drama Award

Kim Ho is an Australian writer, performer and dramaturg based in Melbourne. In his stories, Ho explores genre subversion, cross-cultural encounter, and magic realism. He is known for his short film The Language of Love.

== Works ==
Ho's works include:

- The Language of Love (2013) – Short Film
- The Newsreader (2021) – TV Series
- Spreadsheet (2021) – TV Series
- Mirror's Edge – Play
- The Great Australian – Play
- Buried Kingdom – Play
