= Latrelle Pickett =

Australian rules footballer (born 2005)

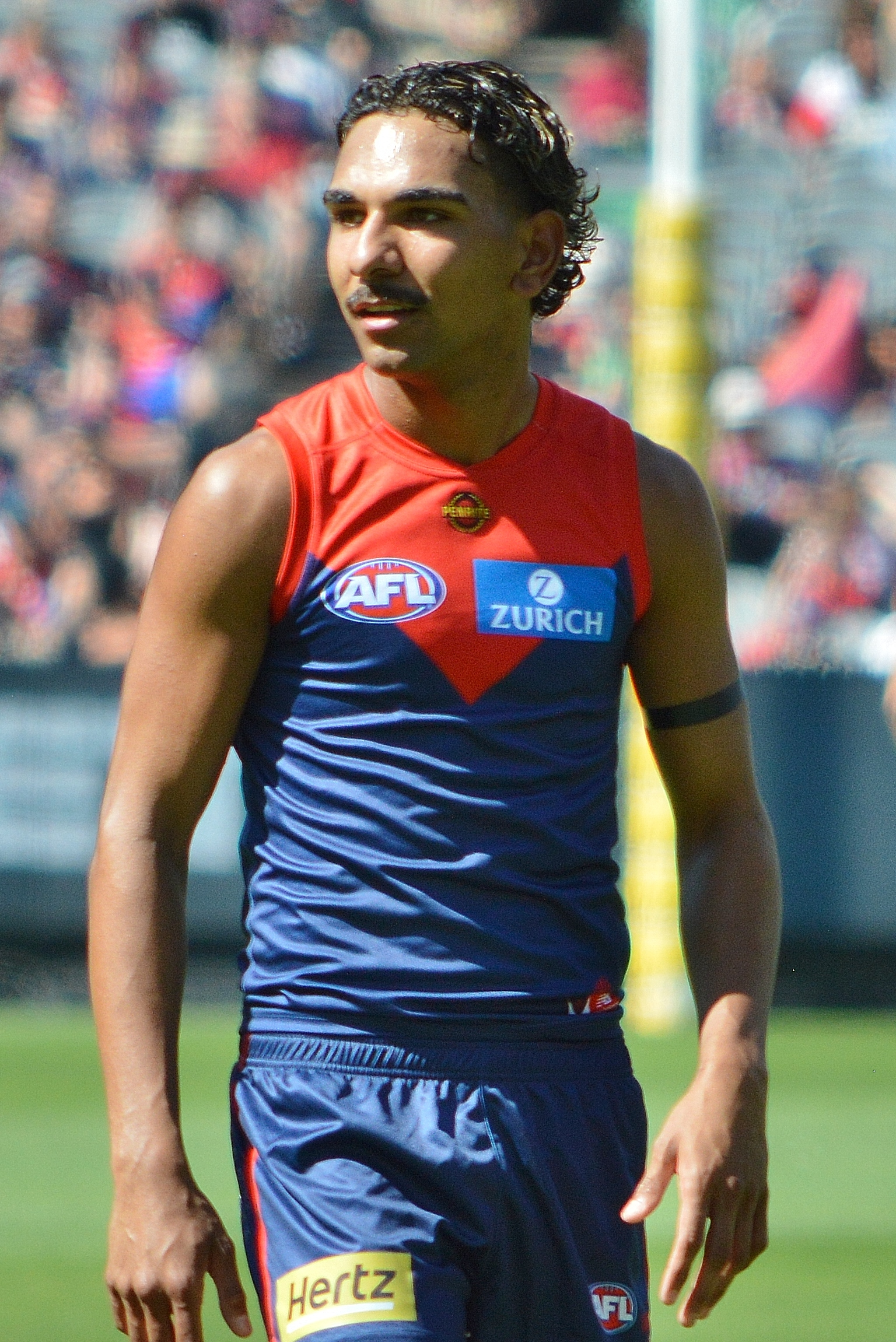
- Pickett in March 2026

Personal information
- Born: 28 December 2005 (age 20)
- Original team: Mallee Park/Glenelg
- Draft: No. 12, 2025 national draft
- Debut: Round 1, 2026, Melbourne vs. St Kilda, at MCG
- Height: 180 cm (5 ft 11 in)
- Position: Forward

Club information
- Current club: Melbourne
- Number: 33

Playing career^{1}
Years	Club	Games (Goals)
2026-	Melbourne	16 (10)
Total		16 (10)
- ^{1} Playing statistics correct to the end of 2026.

Latrelle Pickett (born 28 December 2005) is a professional Australian rules footballer playing for the Melbourne Football Club in the Australian Football League (AFL). He plays as a small forward.

== Early life ==
Pickett grew up in South Australia, and played his junior football for Tumby Bay before moving to Mallee Park in the Port Lincoln Football League. A member of the Pickett family, he is the cousin of fellow Melbourne forward/midfielder Kysaiah Pickett, a nephew of former two-time premiership player and Norm Smith Medallist Byron Pickett, and second-cousin to Marlion Pickett. He is of Indigenous descent.

Pickett was a member of Port Adelaide's Next Generation Academy, but was overlooked in the 2023 AFL draft. After a brief stint in the SANFL with Norwood's under-18s team in 2023, he returned home to Tumby Bay to play country football. In 2025, he returned to the SANFL to play for Glenelg's reserves team, where he kicked 32 goals from 18 games.

Pickett was drafted by Melbourne with pick 12 in the 2025 national draft, with cousin Kysaiah presenting his match jumper.

== AFL career ==
He made his debut in Round 1 of the 2026 AFL season against St Kilda at the MCG.

== Statistics ==
Updated to the end of 2026.

Legend
G	Goals	K	Kicks	D	Disposals	T	Tackles
B	Behinds	H	Handballs	M	Marks

Season	Team	No.	Games	Totals							Averages (per game)							Votes
Season	Team	No.	Games	G	B	K	H	D	M	T	G	B	K	H	D	M	T	Votes
2026	Melbourne	33	16	10	9	82	58	140	27	17	0.6	0.6	5.1	3.6	8.8	1.7	1.1	0
Career			16	10	9	82	58	140	27	17	0.6	0.6	5.1	3.6	8.8	1.7	1.1	0
