= Port Lincoln =

Port Lincoln Galinyala
- Town
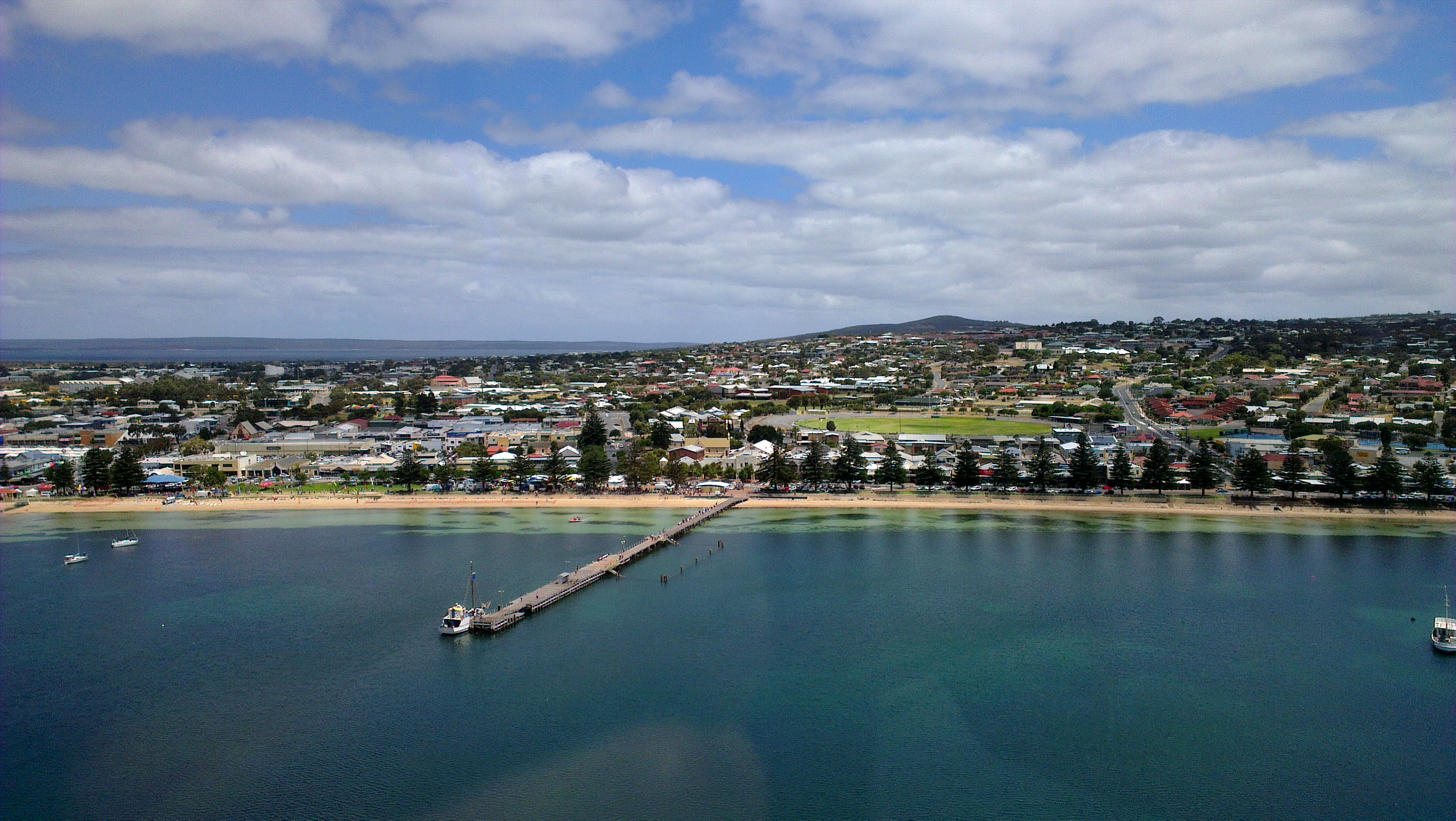
- Port Lincoln

- Coordinates: 34°43′56″S 135°51′31″E
- Country: Australia
- State: South Australia
- Region: Eyre Western
- LGA: City of Port Lincoln
- Location: 280 km (170 mi) from Adelaide (by air); 649 km (403 mi) from Adelaide via
- Established: 1839

Government
  - State electorate: Flinders
  - Federal division: Grey (O'Donoghue)
- Elevation: 7 m (23 ft)

Population
  - Total: 14,404 (UCL 2021)
- Time zone: UTC+9:30 (ACST)
  - Summer (DST): UTC+10:30 (ACST)
- Postcode: 5606
- County: Flinders
- Mean max temp: 21.3 °C (70.3 °F)
- Mean min temp: 11.3 °C (52.3 °F)
- Annual rainfall: 389.7 mm (15.34 in)
Localities around Port Lincoln
Boston	Boston	Port Lincoln (water body)
Duck Ponds	Port Lincoln	Port Lincoln (water body)
Tulka	Port Lincoln (water body)	Port Lincoln (water body)

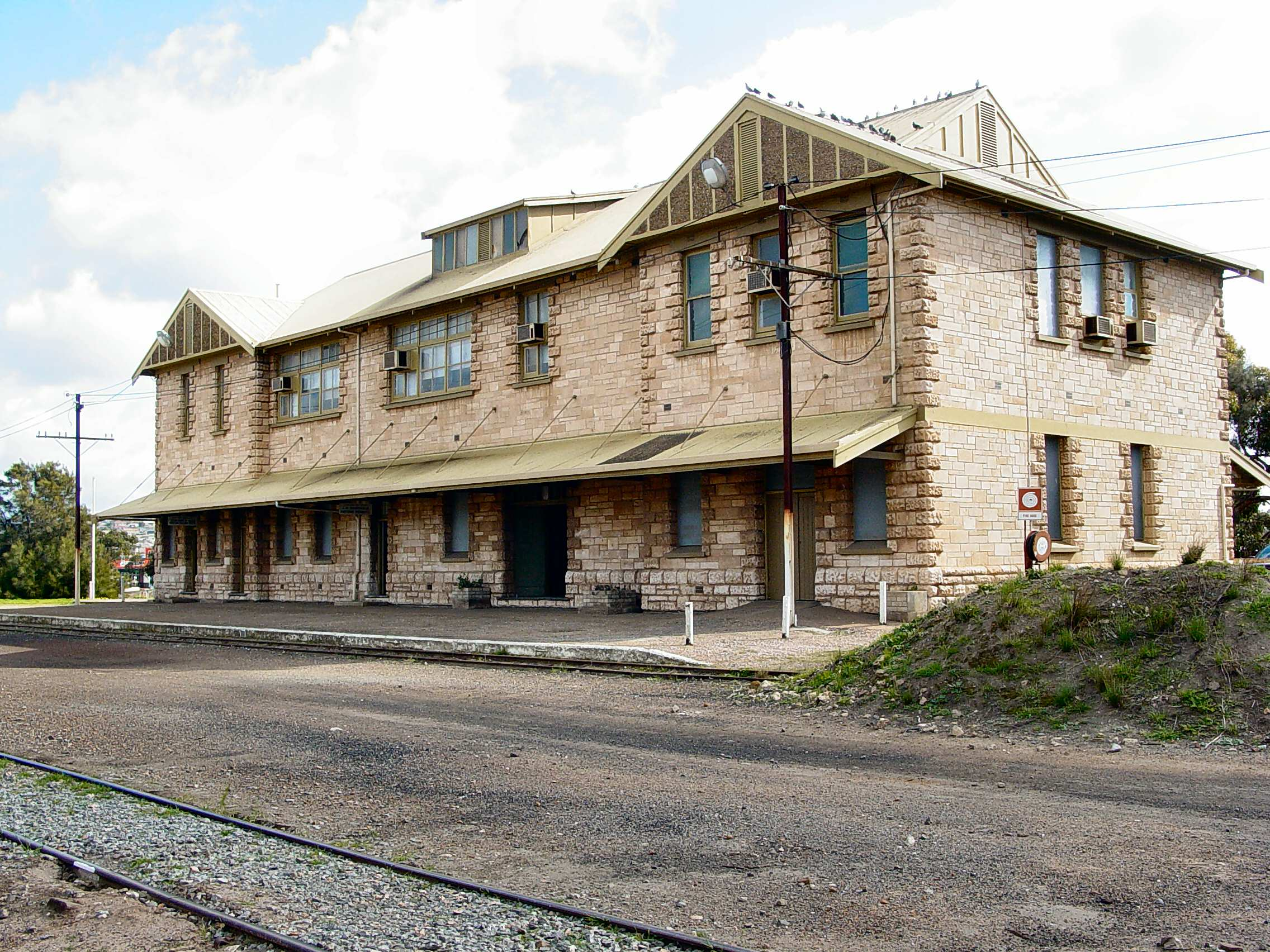
Railway station

Port Lincoln is a city on the Lower Eyre Peninsula in the Australian state of South Australia. Known as Galinyala by the Barngarla people who hold native title rights, it is situated on the shore of Boston Bay, which opens eastward into Spencer Gulf. It is the largest city in the West Coast region, and is located approximately 280 km (170 mi) from the state's capital city of Adelaide (646 km (401 mi) by road).

In June 2019 Port Lincoln had an estimated population of 26,418, having grown at an average annual rate of 0.55% year-on-year over the preceding five years. The city claims to be Australia's "Seafood Capital".

== History and name ==
The Eyre Peninsula has been home to Aboriginal people for over 40,000 years, with the Barngarla (eastern Eyre, including Port Lincoln), Nauo (south western Eyre), Wirangu (north western Eyre) and Mirning (far western Eyre) being the predominant original cultural groups present at the time of the arrival of Europeans.

The Barngala people have been acknowledged as the traditional owners, and their name for Port Lincoln is Galinyala, which in the Barngarla language means "place of sweet water".

Matthew Flinders was the first European to reach Port Lincoln under his commission by the British Admiralty to chart Australia's 'unexplored' coastline. On 25 February 1802, Flinders sailed his exploration vessel HMS Investigator into the harbour, which he later named Port Lincoln after the city of Lincoln in his native county of Lincolnshire in England. A couple of months later, on 19 April, Nicolas Baudin entered the same port and named it Port Champagny.

Sealers had visited the area around 1828 and the mainly French whaling ships were fishing the local bays and island regions by the 1820s and up to the 1840s. In 1836 Governor Sir John Hindmarsh, the first Governor of South Australia, gave instructions to Colonel William Light to find a capital for the "New British Province of South Australia". With boatfuls of immigrants set to arrive and impatient settlers already camping at Holdfast Bay, Rapid Bay and Kangaroo Island, Light was under immense pressure to identify a location with a suitable harbour, sufficient agricultural land and fresh water. After assessing a number of other potential locations, Light was ordered by England to consider Port Lincoln as a possible site for the capital. While Thomas Lipson had arrived in Port Lincoln earlier and approved of its "beautiful harbour" and "fertile land", Light was unconvinced from the beginning, as he faced fierce westerly gales, ill-placed islands and rocky reefs on arrival.

Light decided that it might be dangerous for merchant ships trying to enter the unfamiliar territory after a long voyage and that there was not enough of what he thought was good agricultural land, nor enough fresh water to sustain a city. Instead he selected Adelaide as the most suitable place for settlement.

Port Lincoln, however, proved popular with pioneers and developers. The first settlers arrived on 19 March 1839 aboard the ships Abeona, Porter and Dorset. On 3 October 1839, Governor George Gawler proclaimed the whole area from Cape Catastrophe to the head of the Spencer Gulf as one district, which he named the District of Port Lincoln.

In 1840, one year after settlement, the population of Port Lincoln was 270. There were 30 stone houses, a hotel, blacksmith's shop and a store in the Happy Valley area. Around this time, Edward John Eyre explored the peninsula that was subsequently named in his honour.

In early 1842, local Aboriginal resistance to the British settlement became so successful that it prompted the near abandonment of Port Lincoln. As a result, Governor George Grey ordered a detachment of the 96th Regiment of the British Army under the command of Lieutenant Hugonin to enforce control in the area. After an initial defeat at Pillaworta, the 96th in combination with the Mounted Police and armed settlers were able to restore full British authority by the end of 1843. A section of Native Police were later deployed to the area to maintain this control. An unknown number of Aboriginal people were killed by soldiers near Pillaworta in retribution for the presumed killings of colonists.

In 1849, five Aboriginal people including an infant were poisoned after being given flour mixed with arsenic by hutkeeper Patrick Dwyer near Port Lincoln. Despite being arrested with strong evidence against him, Dwyer was released from custody by Charles Driver, the Government Resident at Port Lincoln.

Local government formally began on the Eyre Peninsula on 1 July 1880, with the establishment of the District Council of Lincoln. The township of Port Lincoln naturally was included in that area. On 18 August 1921, the Municipality of Port Lincoln was formally proclaimed.

By 1936 the population had grown to 3200 and the town had a first-class water supply. The port had become the commercial pivot for the area, providing for its many agricultural and commercial requirements. City status was granted to Port Lincoln on 21 January 1971 and the proclamation was read at the opening of the tenth annual Tunarama Festival on the Australia Day weekend.

=== Water supply ===
The lack of a reliable surface water supply was a factor preventing Port Lincoln from being proclaimed the colony's capital city in the 1830s. Even as a small town, Port Lincoln outgrew its fresh water supplies. It is now largely dependent on water drawn from groundwater basins in the south of the peninsula.

The southern and western parts of the Eyre Peninsula region also share this resource via the Tod-Ceduna pipeline. The Iron Knob to Kimba pipeline completed in 2007 provides limited transfer capacity of River Murray water into the Tod-Ceduna system. Following the development of a long term water supply plan for Eyre Peninsula, the South Australian government is progressing detailed investigation of augmentation options. These include seawater desalination.

Formerly a potable water resource fed by the Tod River, the Tod Reservoir was taken offline in 2001–2002 due to concerns about rising levels of agricultural chemical contamination and salinity.

=== Heritage listings ===
Port Lincoln has a number of places listed on the South Australian Heritage Register, including:

- Dorset Place: Old Mill Lookout
- Hawson Place: Hawson's Grave
- 152 Proper Bay Road: Arrandale
- Railway Terrace: Port Lincoln railway station
- 36 Washington Street: Port Lincoln Police Station and Courthouse
- 20 Windsor Avenue: Ravendale House

== Demographics ==
At June 2018 Port Lincoln had an estimated urban population of 26,326. Aboriginal people make up 5.6% of Port Lincoln's population.

== Geography ==
Port Lincoln has a coastal landscape, ranging from sheltered waters and beaches, to surf beaches and rugged oceanic coastline. The Great South Australian Coastal Upwelling System brings cold, nutrient-rich water into nearby waters of the Great Australian Bight and Spencer Gulf. These upwellings support lucrative fisheries, including that of the southern bluefin tuna and sardine.

=== Climate ===
Port Lincoln has a warm-summer Mediterranean climate (Köppen: Csb). The climate is highly variable due to the town's position between the Outback and Southern Ocean. Summers alternate between frequent southerly sea breezes (keeping maxima under 30.0 °C (86.0 °F)), with occasional northerly heatwaves (that raise the temperature to well over 40.0 °C (104.0 °F)). Meanwhile, winters are cool and cloudy, with frequent drizzle, showers and cold fronts, albeit with frost being very rare.

There is moderate seasonal temperature variation and seasonal lag, with average maxima ranging from 26.2 °C (79.2 °F) in January to 16.1 °C (61.0 °F) in July, while average minima vary from 16.1 °C (61.0 °F) in February to 7.2 °C (45.0 °F) in August. Average annual rainfall is rather low, 392.5 mm (15.45 in), occurring within 127.1 rainfall days, and the wettest month on record was 200.4 mm (7.89 in) in June 1981. Despite the low intensity of rainfall: there are 154.5 cloudy days and only 57.2 clear days annually. Extreme temperatures have ranged from −0.3 °C (31.5 °F) on 16 July 2016 to 48.3 °C (118.9 °F) on 24 January 2019.

Climate data for Port Lincoln (34º36'00"S, 135º52'48"E, 9 m AMSL) (1992–2024 normals and extremes, sun 1973–1991)
Month	Jan	Feb	Mar	Apr	May	Jun	Jul	Aug	Sep	Oct	Nov	Dec	Year
Record high °C (°F)	48.3 (118.9)	44.4 (111.9)	43.3 (109.9)	39.5 (103.1)	32.7 (90.9)	27.3 (81.1)	24.1 (75.4)	31.2 (88.2)	35.9 (96.6)	40.8 (105.4)	45.8 (114.4)	45.6 (114.1)	48.3 (118.9)
Mean maximum °C (°F)	41.7 (107.1)	38.3 (100.9)	36.1 (97.0)	32.2 (90.0)	27.3 (81.1)	21.1 (70.0)	20.4 (68.7)	23.4 (74.1)	28.2 (82.8)	33.4 (92.1)	36.3 (97.3)	37.6 (99.7)	43.5 (110.3)
Mean daily maximum °C (°F)	26.2 (79.2)	25.9 (78.6)	24.4 (75.9)	22.3 (72.1)	19.5 (67.1)	16.8 (62.2)	16.1 (61.0)	16.8 (62.2)	18.7 (65.7)	21.0 (69.8)	23.0 (73.4)	24.7 (76.5)	21.3 (70.3)
Daily mean °C (°F)	21.0 (69.8)	21.0 (69.8)	19.6 (67.3)	17.3 (63.1)	14.9 (58.8)	12.7 (54.9)	11.8 (53.2)	12.0 (53.6)	13.4 (56.1)	15.3 (59.5)	17.5 (63.5)	19.4 (66.9)	16.3 (61.4)
Mean daily minimum °C (°F)	15.8 (60.4)	16.1 (61.0)	14.7 (58.5)	12.2 (54.0)	10.3 (50.5)	8.5 (47.3)	7.4 (45.3)	7.2 (45.0)	8.0 (46.4)	9.6 (49.3)	12.0 (53.6)	14.0 (57.2)	11.3 (52.4)
Mean minimum °C (°F)	11.4 (52.5)	11.8 (53.2)	9.6 (49.3)	7.6 (45.7)	5.9 (42.6)	3.8 (38.8)	3.4 (38.1)	3.0 (37.4)	3.3 (37.9)	4.6 (40.3)	6.5 (43.7)	8.6 (47.5)	2.2 (36.0)
Record low °C (°F)	8.5 (47.3)	6.8 (44.2)	6.7 (44.1)	5.1 (41.2)	3.0 (37.4)	0.7 (33.3)	−0.3 (31.5)	1.3 (34.3)	0.1 (32.2)	2.3 (36.1)	4.1 (39.4)	5.2 (41.4)	−0.3 (31.5)
Average precipitation mm (inches)	19.6 (0.77)	15.5 (0.61)	16.5 (0.65)	21.1 (0.83)	41.8 (1.65)	62.0 (2.44)	55.2 (2.17)	52.3 (2.06)	39.3 (1.55)	29.1 (1.15)	21.4 (0.84)	18.3 (0.72)	392.5 (15.45)
Average precipitation days (≥ 0.2 mm)	4.7	3.7	5.8	8.5	14.9	17.2	18.2	18.0	13.7	9.6	6.8	6.0	127.1
Average afternoon relative humidity (%)	50	52	54	57	61	66	66	64	62	56	52	51	58
Average dew point °C (°F)	12.2 (54.0)	12.8 (55.0)	12.0 (53.6)	10.8 (51.4)	9.6 (49.3)	8.9 (48.0)	8.1 (46.6)	8.0 (46.4)	8.7 (47.7)	8.7 (47.7)	10.0 (50.0)	11.0 (51.8)	10.1 (50.1)
Mean monthly sunshine hours	294.5	245.8	223.2	183.0	151.9	129.0	155.0	179.8	189.0	229.4	243.0	272.8	2,496.4
Percentage possible sunshine	67	65	59	54	48	44	50	53	53	57	58	61	56
Source: Bureau of Meteorology (1992–2024 normals and extremes, sun 1973–1991)

== Government ==
Port Lincoln is located in the federal Division of Grey, the state electoral district of Flinders and the local government area of City of Port Lincoln.

== Economy ==
The economy is based on the huge grain-handling facilities (with a total capacity of over 337,500 tonnes), the canning and fish processing works, lambs, wool and beef, and tuna farming for the Japanese market. Home of Australia's largest commercial fishing fleet, Port Lincoln now has a thriving aquaculture industry that farms the following species: southern bluefin tuna, yellowtail kingfish, abalone, mussels, oysters, and experimentally, seahorses and spiny lobsters. Before the advent of aquaculture, the main fishing was for southern bluefin tuna. Frank Moorhouse recommended the South Australian government lend the Haldane family 20,000 pounds which they used to build a super vessel. The MFV Tacoma was Australia's first purpose-built tuna fishing vessel. It revolutionised the industry and began catching the fish off the coast of Port Lincoln in the early 1950s.

The city also functions as a regional centre for government administration, corporate services and commerce to Eyre Peninsula; however, many state government functions are gradually being withdrawn as they become more centralised in Adelaide. During the early years of this century, housing demand has led to a boom in property development, both residential and commercial.

A proposal by Centrex Metals to export iron ore through an expanded facility at the existing Port Lincoln wharf was approved by the South Australian Government c. Oct 2009. The proposal was abandoned by the company following strong public opposition. The chief public concern was the potential harm that spillage or dust plumes might cause to the profitability or reputation of the region's dominant seafood industry.

=== Tourism ===
Port Lincoln is a centre for tourism, with access to both Spencer Gulf and the Great Australian Bight mark Port Lincoln out as a site for yachting, scuba diving, shark cage diving and game fishing. Lincoln National Park, Coffin Bay National Park and Kellidie Bay Conservation Park are within driving distance.

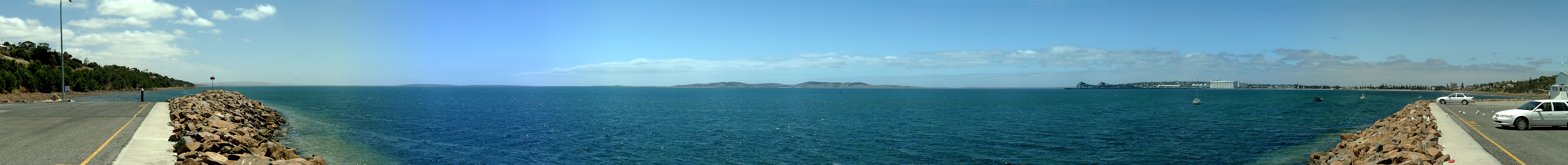
Panorama of Boston Bay, with Port Lincoln in the right third of picture

== Transport ==
Port Lincoln railway station is the terminus of Eyre Peninsula Railway, a narrow gauge (1,067 mm (3 ft 6 in)) railway which consists of three lines; Port Lincoln to Kevin, Cummins to Buckleboo and Yeelanna to Kapinnie.

Port Lincoln was also the port terminus for the privately owned standard-gauge Coffin Bay Tramway that operated from 1966 to 1989 to carry lime sand to the port at Proper Bay on the south side of the town for BHP. It was used as flux in blast furnaces.

Port Lincoln Airport is located a few kilometres north of the city. Rex Airlines and QantasLink provide multiple daily flights to the state capital of Adelaide. All flights that QantasLink operate in and out of Port Lincoln Airport are operated using their Dash 8-300 aircraft.

The Port Lincoln Bus Service operates Monday to Friday from 9.00 am to 4.30 pm with separate morning and afternoon services. The morning service runs to a fixed route timetable and services Lincoln North and Lincoln South.

Long-distance bus services are operated by Stateliner with multiple daily services to Adelaide and Port Augusta.

== Culture ==
The book Blue Fin by Colin Thiele was set in Port Lincoln, with the movie of the same name filmed in nearby Streaky Bay.

Some of the ANZAC Cove scenes in Gallipoli were also filmed near Port Lincoln.

The first edition of Australian Survivor, the Australian version of the popular US television series, Survivor, was filmed at Whalers Way, south of Port Lincoln, in 2001.

The Discovery Channel documentary series Tuna Wranglers (2007) and Abalone Wars were both filmed in and around Port Lincoln.

Port Lincoln was visited in 1939 by English travel author Eric Newby, while he was crew in the 4-masted barque Moshulu, which anchored outside of Boston Island. Moshulu had taken 82 days to sail to Port Lincoln from Belfast in ballast (a fast passage for a windjammer), but there was no grain to be had there, even though Moshulu waited at anchor for most of January. The crew was given shore leave in Port Lincoln, encountering large amounts of Australian wine. Moshulu eventually carried on to Port Victoria for cargo. During the 1939 season, Passat and Lawhill were also present at Port Lincoln. Newby wrote about his experiences on the round-trip from Ireland to South Australia in his book The Last Grain Race (1956), and several pictures of Port Lincoln as it appeared in 1939 are included in his photo-essay of his voyage, Learning the Ropes.

On the TV show Neighbours, the Brennan brothers, Tyler, Mark and Aaron, are originally from Port Lincoln.

The town was featured in the second series of An Idiot Abroad. British comedian Karl Pilkington was in Port Lincoln for the show where he swam with sharks.

== Sport ==
According to the Port Lincoln Council the most popular sports are tennis, Australian rules football, soccer, netball and basketball. The Port Lincoln Football League (PLFL) has 6 teams competing including the Mallee Park Football Club which is notable as having produced many Australian Football League players, particularly indigenous. Centenary Oval has a capacity for 7,500 and has hosted Australian Football League (AFL) pre-season matches in 2005 and 2015. Port Lincoln Soccer Association runs a 4 team competition.

== Media ==
Historically, South Australia's first rural newspaper, the Port Lincoln Herald, owned by Robert Thomas, was published on 10 April 1839, before ceasing publication in September 1840. According to the first edition, "...The object of the proprietors...is to promulgate just accounts of the capabilities of the only safe and commodious harbour yet known within the territories of South Australia." Only six issues were released, with the first edition being printed in Hindley Street, Adelaide, and the second issue arriving seven months later, after being printed in a hut at Port Lincoln.

The Western Weekly News (22 March 1902 – 1904) was also briefly published in the town, as was another short lived, but outspoken publication, called Challenger (28 May 1932 – 4 June 1934), a sister publication of the West Coast Recorder. The town was also the base of the Port Lincoln, Tumby and West Coast Recorder (22 July 1904 – 6 October 1909), later known as the West Coast Recorder (1909–1942), which was then absorbed by the Port Lincoln Times. These days, Port Lincoln has one local newspaper (the Port Lincoln Times), a Rural Press publication first issued on 5 August 1927. It is published on Tuesdays and Thursdays and is printed in Murray Bridge at the high-tech Rural Press printing centre.

Port Lincoln has two local commercial radio stations, 89.9 Magic FM and 765 AM 5CC (the first local commercial station) broadcasting out of their Washington Street studio. It is also served by ABC West Coast SA on 1485 AM which broadcasts out of the Civic Centre on Tasman Terrace. It's also served by Triple J and ABC Radio National from Tumby Bay and satellite uplink from Melbourne respectively. ABC News Radio is also available on 91.5FM. It also receives KIXFM 87.6.

Free to air TV stations available in Port Lincoln are ABC, SBS, Seven GTS/BKN (formerly Central Television), the Nine Network and Network 10. Also available is Foxtel pay TV.

== Twin towns ==
Port Lincoln is twinned with:

- Lincoln, United Kingdom

== Notable people ==
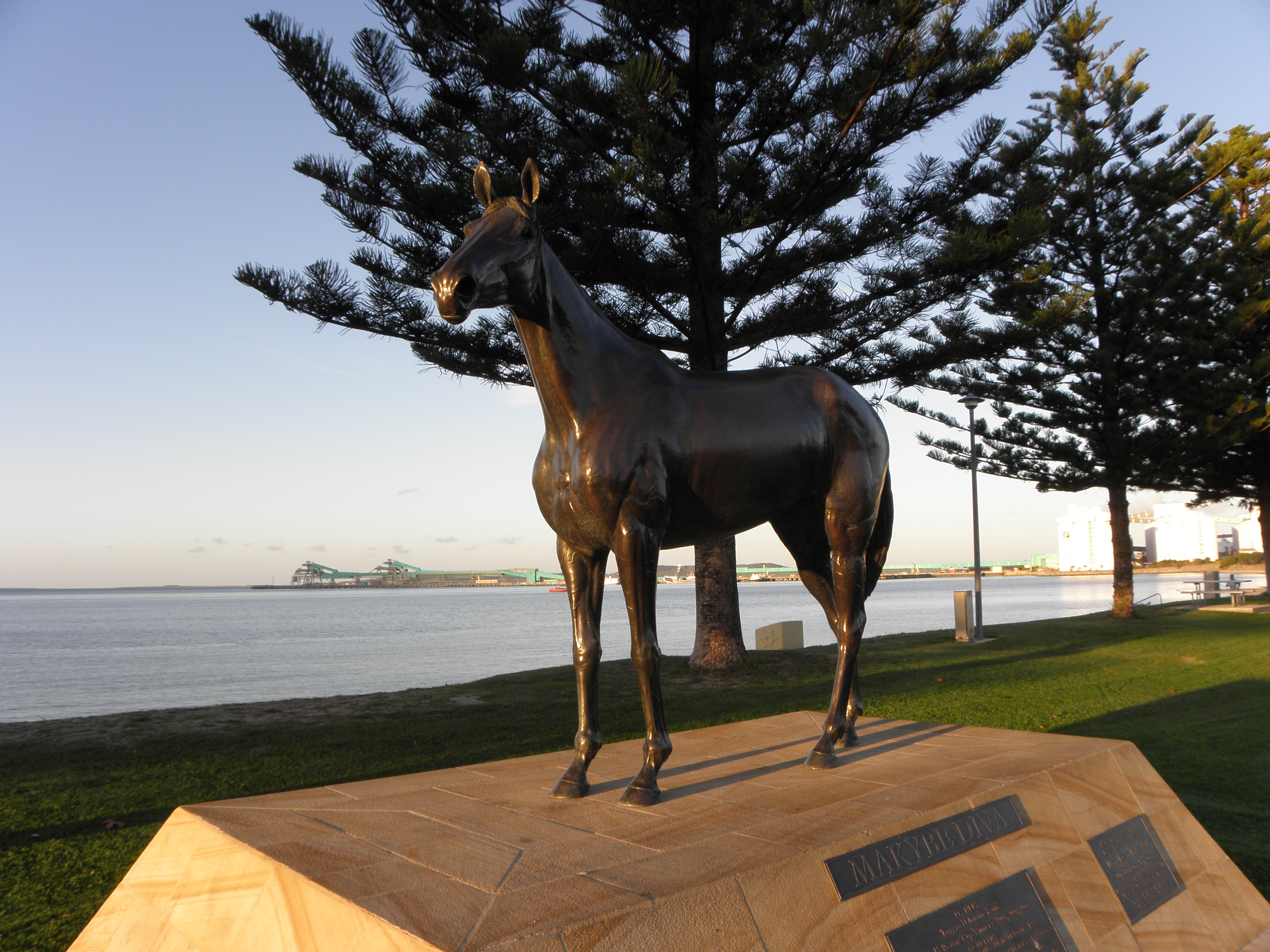
Statue of Makybe Diva by artist, Ken Martin, at Port Lincoln, South Australia

- Eddie Betts – Australian rules football player
- Peter Burgoyne – Australian rules football player
- Shaun Burgoyne – Australian rules football player
- Kyle Chalmers – 2016 and 2020 Summer Olympian, son of Brett Chalmers
- Graham Johncock – Australian rules football player
- Dean Lukin – weightlifter who won the Olympic Gold Medal in the Super heavyweight division at the 1984 Los Angeles Olympics; also won gold at the 1982 Brisbane Commonwealth Games and the 1986 Edinburgh Commonwealth Games; a tuna fisherman
- Harry Miller – Australian rules football player
- Haidarr Jones – camera operator Award winning foreign correspondent
- Kieran Modra – visually impaired Paralympic cyclist; born in Port Lincoln
- Lauren Nourse – Australian netball player; began her career in Port Lincoln at age 7
- Byron Pickett – Australian rules football player
- Tony Santic – racehorse owner and tuna farmer; owner of Makybe Diva, the only horse to have won the Melbourne Cup three times
- Lindsay Thomas – Australian rules football player
- Daniel Wells – Australian rules football player
- Bianca Woolford – para-cyclist

== See also ==
- Port Lincoln Prison
