= Port Lincoln Football League =

- Sport: Australian rules football
- Founded: 1910
- No. of teams: 6
- Most recent champions: Marble Range (13th premiership) (2026)
- Most titles: Waybacks (33 premierships)
- Related competitions: SANFL
- Website: http://www.plfl.com.au/

The Port Lincoln Football League is an Australian rules football competition based at the southern extremity of the Eyre Peninsula region of South Australia, Australia. It is an affiliated member of the South Australian National Football League. Port Lincoln Football League games are officiated by the Port Lincoln Football League Umpires Association.

== Brief history ==
The league was originally formed in 1910 as the Port Lincoln Football Association.

The league was reformed in 1946 (having been in recess during World War II) under its current title of Port Lincoln Football League. At that time the participating clubs were Lincoln South, Tasman and Waybacks.

Marble Range rejoined the league in 1953 from the Great Flinders FL, having been a member of the PLFA before World War II. Their re-entry was conditional on a probation period where they would only play B Grade until winning a premiership in this division, which they achieved in 1956 and were promoted to the senior division.

Tumby Bay and Eyre United joined the league after the Eastern Eyre Football Association folded after the 1961 season, although both clubs eventually moved to the Great Flinders FL, Eyre United in 1971 and Tumby Bay in 1981.

Boston and Mallee Park were formed to join the Port Lincoln FL in 1972 and 1980 respectively.

=== 2010 Controversy ===
On 17 July 2010 Boston forfeited all matches to Mallee Park citing issues with on field violence and a refusal by the league to take action to prevent it. The club has alleged that it could be facing expulsion from the league for taking this action.

== Clubs ==
=== Locations ===
Club locations - Port Lincoln	Club locations - Marble Range
	Locations of the Port Lincoln FL clubs - Marble Range

=== Current ===
Club	Jumper	Nickname	Home Ground	Former League	Est.	Years in PLFL	PLFL Senior Premierships	
Club	Jumper	Nickname	Home Ground	Former League	Est.	Years in PLFL	Total	Years
Boston		Tigers	Poole Oval, Port Lincoln	–	1972	1972–	1	1986
Lincoln South		Eagles	Centenary Oval, Port Lincoln	–	1946	1946–	15	1946, 1952, 1954, 1957, 1964, 1969, 1970, 1972, 1981, 1983, 1991, 2002, 2023, 2024, 2025
Mallee Park		Peckers	Mallee Park Oval, Port Lincoln	–	1980	1980–	16	1985, 1987, 1988, 1989, 1990, 1993, 1994, 1995, 1996, 1999, 2001, 2009, 2010, 2011, 2015, 2016
Marble Range		Magpies	Wangary Oval, Wangary	GFFL	1938	1938–1947, 1953–	13	1940, 1941, 1978, 1982, 1997, 1998, 2000, 2004, 2006, 2007, 2021, 2022, 2026
Tasman Imperial		Roosters	Ravendale Sporting Complex, Port Lincoln	–	1946	1946–	15	1947, 1949, 1950, 1961, 1962, 1965, 1967, 1977, 1992, 2012, 2013, 2014, 2018, 2019, 2020
Wayback		Demons	Centenary Oval, Port Lincoln	–	1903	1910–	33	1910, 1911, 1915, 1924, 1925, 1929, 1930, 1931, 1932, 1933, 1934, 1948, 1951, 1953, 1955, 1956, 1958, 1959, 1960, 1963, 1966, 1971, 1973, 1974, 1975, 1976, 1979, 1980, 1984, 2003, 2005, 2008, 2017

=== Former ===
Club	Jumper	Nickname	Home Ground	Former League	Est.	Years in PLFL	PLFL Senior Premierships		Fate
Club	Jumper	Nickname	Home Ground	Former League	Est.	Years in PLFL	Total	Years	Fate
Boston Bay			Centenary Oval, Port Lincoln	–	1909	1910–1912, 1920–1931	3	1921, 1927, 1928	Folded in 1932
Centrals			Centenary Oval, Port Lincoln	–	1932	1932–1940	4	1935, 1936, 1937, 1938	Did not re-form after World War II
Eyre United		Saints	Ungarra Oval, Ungarra	–	1963	1963–1970	0	-	Moved to Great Flinders FL in 1971
Kirtonians			Centenary Oval, Port Lincoln	–	1930	1932–1940	1	1939	Did not re-form after World War II
North Shields			Doward Oval, North Shields	–	1959	1959-1962	0	-	Folded after 1962 season
Port Lincoln			Centenary Oval, Port Lincoln	–	1910	1910–1915	1	1914	Did not re-form after World War I
Railways			Centenary Oval, Port Lincoln	–	1912	1912–1915	1	1912	Did not re-form after World War I
Rovers			Centenary Oval, Port Lincoln	–	1915	1915–1932	5	1919, 1922, 1923, 1926, 1927	Folded in 1933
Tumby Bay	(1911-14)(1962-80)	Blues	Tumby Bay Oval, Tumby Bay	EEPFA	1906	1911–1914, 1962–1980	2	1913, 1968	Entered recess after 1914 season, re-formed in Eastern Eyre Peninsula FA in 1920. Moved to Great Flinders FL in 1981
Wheat Scheme			Centenary Oval, Port Lincoln	–	1919	1919	0	-	Folded after 1919 season

== Notable former players ==
A number of players from the Port Lincoln FL clubs have gone on to play professionally in the SANFL and AFL. The team with most players to do so at any one time is Mallee Park, who have direct player/team relationships with at least 11 current indigenous players on 6 AFL team lists, including Graham Johncock, Eddie Betts, Harry Miller, Russell Coulthard, Daniel Wells, Lindsay Thomas, Byron Pickett and brothers Peter and Shaun Burgoyne.

Mallee Park also has a direct relationship with some other Indigenous players whose fathers have played for the club in its early foundation years in the early 1980s.

== Premiers ==
- 1910 Wayback
- 1911 Wayback
- 1912 Railways
- 1913 Tumby Bay
- 1914 Port Lincoln
- 1915 Wayback
- 1916-1918 Recess
- 1919 Rovers
- 1920 Rovers
- 1921 Boston Bay
- 1922 Rovers
- 1923 Rovers
- 1924 Wayback
- 1925 Wayback
- 1926 Rovers
- 1927 Boston Bay
- 1928 Boston Bay
- 1929 Wayback
- 1930 Wayback
- 1931 Wayback
- 1932 Wayback
- 1933 Wayback
- 1934 Wayback
- 1935 Centrals
- 1936 Centrals
- 1937 Centrals
- 1938 Centrals
- 1939 Kirtonians
- 1940 Marble Range
- 1941 Marble Range
- 1942-1945 Recess
- 1946 Lincoln South
- 1947 Tasman
- 1948 Wayback
- 1949 Tasman
- 1950 Tasman
- 1951 Wayback
- 1952 Lincoln South
- 1953 Wayback
- 1954 Lincoln South
- 1955 Wayback
- 1956 Wayback
- 1957 Lincoln South
- 1958 Tasman
- 1959 Wayback
- 1960 Wayback
- 1961 Tasman
- 1962 Tasman
- 1963 Wayback
- 1964 Lincoln South
- 1965 Tasman
- 1966 Wayback
- 1967 Tasman
- 1968 Tumby Bay
- 1969 Lincoln South
- 1970 Lincoln South
- 1971 Wayback
- 1972 Lincoln South
- 1973 Wayback
- 1974 Wayback
- 1975 Wayback
- 1976 Wayback
- 1977 Tasman
- 1978 Marble Range
- 1979 Wayback
- 1980 Wayback
- 1981 Lincoln South
- 1982 Marble Range
- 1983 Lincoln South
- 1984 Wayback
- 1985 Mallee Park
- 1986 Boston
- 1987 Mallee Park
- 1988 Mallee Park
- 1989 Mallee Park
- 1990 Mallee Park
- 1991 Lincoln South
- 1992 Tasman
- 1993 Mallee Park
- 1994 Mallee Park
- 1995 Mallee Park
- 1996 Mallee Park
- 1997 Marble Range
- 1998 Marble Range
- 1999 Mallee Park
- 2000 Marble Range
- 2001 Mallee Park
- 2002 Lincoln South
- 2003 Wayback
- 2004 Marble Range
- 2005 Wayback
- 2006 Marble Range
- 2007 Marble Range
- 2008 Wayback
- 2009 Mallee Park
- 2010 Mallee Park
- 2011 Mallee Park
- 2012 Tasman
- 2013 Tasman
- 2014 Tasman
- 2015 Mallee Park
- 2016 Mallee Park
- 2017 Wayback
- 2018 Tasman
- 2019 Tasman
- 2020 Tasman
- 2021 Marble Range
- 2022 Marble Range
- 2023 Lincoln South
- 2024 Lincoln South
- 2025 Lincoln South
- 2026 Marble Range

== 2006 Ladder ==
Port Lincoln	Wins	Byes	Losses	Draws	For	Against	%	Pts	Final	Team	G	B	Pts	Team	G	B	Pts
Marble Range	13	0	1	1	1803	632	74.05%	27	1st Semi	Mallee Park	24	5	149	Tasman	12	10	82
Waybacks	11	0	4	0	1363	795	63.16%	22	2nd Semi	Marble Range	7	7	49	Waybacks	6	4	40
Mallee Park	9	0	5	1	1531	1005	60.37%	19	Preliminary	Waybacks	11	10	76	Mallee Park	10	7	67
Tasman	6	0	9	0	1167	1358	46.22%	12	Grand	Marble Range	10	6	66	Waybacks	7	15	57
Lincoln South	5	0	10	0	1218	1139	51.68%	10									
Bostons	0	0	15	0	471	2624	15.22%	0									

== 2007 Ladder ==
Port Lincoln	Wins	Byes	Losses	Draws	For	Against	%	Pts	Final	Team	G	B	Pts	Team	G	B	Pts
Marble Range	14	0	1	0	1512	794	65.57%	28	1st Semi	Waybacks	9	11	65	Bostons	7	9	51
Mallee Park	9	0	6	0	1441	1154	55.53%	18	2nd Semi	Marble Range	14	14	98	Mallee Park	8	19	67
Bostons	8	0	7	0	1103	1189	48.12%	16	Preliminary	Mallee Park	16	20	116	Waybacks	7	8	50
Waybacks	7	0	8	0	886	1110	44.39%	14	Grand	Marble Range	18	9	117	Mallee Park	9	11	65
Lincoln South	4	0	11	0	1053	1343	43.95%	8									
Tasman	3	0	12	0	927	1332	41.04%	6									

== 2008 Ladder ==
Port Lincoln	Wins	Byes	Losses	Draws	For	Against	%	Pts	Final	Team	G	B	Pts	Team	G	B	Pts
Mallee Park	13	0	2	0	1689	962	63.71%	26	1st Semi	Marble Range	14	11	95	Tasman	11	5	71
Waybacks	9	0	6	0	1180	941	55.63%	18	2nd Semi	Mallee Park	12	4	76	Waybacks	5	7	37
Marble Range	9	0	6	0	1140	944	54.70%	18	Preliminary	Waybacks	8	10	58	Marble Range	8	6	54
Tasman	6	0	9	0	1179	1335	46.90%	12	Grand	Waybacks	13	14	92	Mallee Park	9	8	62
Bostons	6	0	9	0	995	1220	44.92%	12									
Lincoln South	2	0	13	0	720	1501	32.42%	4									

== 2009 Ladder ==
Port Lincoln	Wins	Byes	Losses	Draws	For	Against	%	Pts	Final	Team	G	B	Pts	Team	G	B	Pts
Mallee Park	14	0	1	0	1551	865	64.20%	28	1st Semi	Marble Range	8	12	60	Lincoln South	7	3	45
Waybacks	12	0	3	0	1143	838	57.70%	24	2nd Semi	Mallee Park	14	11	95	Waybacks	8	15	63
Lincoln South	9	0	6	0	1199	1110	51.93%	18	Preliminary	Marble Range	13	8	86	Waybacks	11	6	72
Marble Range	5	0	10	0	799	1156	40.87%	10	Grand	Mallee Park	20	9	129	Marble Range	13	3	81
Bostons	3	0	12	0	843	1128	42.77%	6									
Tasman	2	0	13	0	915	1353	40.34%	4									

== 2010 Ladder ==
Port Lincoln	Wins	Byes	Losses	Draws	For	Against	%	Pts	Final	Team	G	B	Pts	Team	G	B	Pts
Tasman	11	0	4	0	1218	983	55.34%	22	1st Semi	Mallee Park	19	11	125	Waybacks	12	4	76
Lincoln South	11	0	4	0	1159	963	54.62%	22	2nd Semi	Tasman	6	8	44	Lincoln South	4	10	34
Waybacks	10	0	5	0	1259	811	60.82%	20	Preliminary	Mallee Park	19	10	124	Lincoln South	8	9	57
Mallee Park	10	0	5	0	1128	867	56.54%	20	Grand	Mallee Park	16	17	113	Tasman	13	4	82
Marble Range	3	0	12	0	930	1009	47.96%	6									
Bostons	0	0	15	0	621	1682	26.96%	0									

== 2011 Ladder ==
Port Lincoln	Wins	Byes	Losses	Draws	For	Against	%	Pts	Final	Team	G	B	Pts	Team	G	B	Pts
Waybacks	11	0	3	0	1333	905	59.56%	22	1st Semi	Tasman	10	9	69	Marble Range	5	4	34
Mallee Park	11	0	3	0	1429	1037	57.95%	22	2nd Semi	Mallee Park	13	7	85	Waybacks	6	11	47
Tasman	9	0	5	0	1245	850	59.43%	18	Preliminary	Waybacks	8	12	60	Tasman	8	10	58
Marble Range	5	0	9	0	898	1133	44.21%	10	Grand	Mallee Park	16	9	105	Waybacks	14	7	91
Bostons	3	0	11	0	831	1254	39.86%	6									
Lincoln South	3	0	11	0	860	1417	37.77%	6									

== 2012 Ladder ==
Port Lincoln	Wins	Byes	Losses	Draws	For	Against	%	Pts	Final	Team	G	B	Pts	Team	G	B	Pts
Tasman	13	0	2	0	1478	822	64.26%	26	1st Semi	Lincoln South	17	15	117	Waybacks	8	10	58
Mallee Park	9	0	5	1	1531	1200	56.06%	19	2nd Semi	Mallee Park	13	13	91	Tasman	9	14	68
Waybacks	9	0	5	1	1144	928	55.21%	19	Preliminary	Tasman	20	8	128	Lincoln South	12	12	84
Lincoln South	8	0	7	0	1295	963	57.35%	16	Grand	Tasman	15	18	108	Mallee Park	6	5	41
Marble Range	5	0	10	0	937	1222	43.40%	10									
Bostons	0	0	15	0	542	1792	23.22%	0									

== 2013 Ladder ==
Port Lincoln	Wins	Byes	Losses	Draws	For	Against	%	Pts	Final	Team	G	B	Pts	Team	G	B	Pts
Tasman	13	0	2	0	1616	721	69.15%	26	1st Semi	Lincoln South	12	9	81	Mallee Park	11	12	78
Waybacks	10	0	5	0	1350	1012	57.15%	20	2nd Semi	Tasman	18	12	120	Waybacks	6	6	42
Lincoln South	9	0	6	0	1193	971	55.13%	18	Preliminary	Lincoln South	11	10	76	Waybacks	8	10	58
Mallee Park	7	0	7	1	1351	1127	54.52%	15	Grand	Tasman	18	9	117	Lincoln South	7	6	48
Marble Range	4	0	11	0	791	1312	37.61%	8									
Bostons	1	0	13	1	607	1765	25.59%	3									

== 2014 Ladder ==
Port Lincoln	Wins	Byes	Losses	Draws	For	Against	%	Pts	Final	Team	G	B	Pts	Team	G	B	Pts
Tasman	13	0	2	0	1253	929	57.42%	26	1st Semi	Waybacks	17	11	113	Boston	12	8	80
Mallee Park	11	0	4	0	1640	1150	58.78%	22	2nd Semi	Mallee Park	12	13	85	Tasman	12	10	82
Waybacks	10	0	5	0	1139	1029	52.54%	20	Preliminary	Tasman	13	13	91	Waybacks	3	2	20
Bostons	5	0	9	1	1006	1097	47.84%	11	Grand	Tasman	18	14	122	Mallee Park	13	5	83
Marble Range	4	0	10	1	888	1059	45.61%	9									
Lincoln South	1	0	14	0	860	1522	36.10%	2									

== 2015 Ladder ==
Port Lincoln	Wins	Byes	Losses	Draws	For	Against	%	Pts	Final	Team	G	B	Pts	Team	G	B	Pts
Mallee Park	12	0	3	0	1839	1166	61.20%	24	1st Semi	Tasman	14	9	93	Wayback	9	6	60
Boston	11	0	4	0	1546	997	60.79%	22	2nd Semi	Mallee Park	18	13	121	Boston	17	5	107
Wayback	9	0	6	0	1032	1028	50.10%	18	Preliminary	Boston	12	10	82	Tasman	9	13	67
Tasman	7	0	8	0	958	1252	43.35%	14	Grand	Mallee Park	18	21	129	Boston	11	8	74
Lincoln South	3	0	12	0	899	1340	40.15%	6									
Marble Range	3	0	12	0	896	1387	39.25%	6									

== 2016 Ladder ==
Port Lincoln	Wins	Byes	Losses	Draws	For	Against	%	Pts	Final	Team	G	B	Pts	Team	G	B	Pts
Mallee Park	13	0	2	0	1844	798	69.80%	26	1st Semi	Lincoln South	11	14	80	Wayback	6	7	43
Marble Range	11	0	4	0	1182	751	61.15%	22	2nd Semi	Mallee Park	12	19	91	Marble Range	3	7	25
Wayback	9	0	6	0	1080	1104	49.45%	18	Preliminary	Lincoln South	17	12	114	Marble Range	3	8	26
Lincoln South	8	0	7	0	1194	1058	53.02%	16	Grand	Mallee Park	15	13	103	Lincoln South	13	8	86
Boston	2	0	13	0	857	1388	38.17%	4									
Tasman	2	0	13	0	624	1682	27.06%	4									

== 2017 Ladder ==
Port Lincoln	Wins	Byes	Losses	Draws	For	Against	%	Pts	Final	Team	G	B	Pts	Team	G	B	Pts
Mallee Park	14	0	1	0	1915	859	69.03%	28	1st Semi	Marble Range	4	8	32	Lincoln South	4	7	31
Wayback	11	0	4	0	1253	773	61.85%	22	2nd Semi	Wayback	16	9	105	Mallee Park	15	14	104
Marble Range	10	0	5	0	1179	894	56.87%	20	Preliminary	Marble Range	13	8	86	Mallee Park	11	14	80
Lincoln South	5	0	10	0	987	1022	49.13%	10	Grand	Wayback	6	10	46	Marble Range	4	8	32
Tasman	5	0	10	0	742	1174	38.73%	10									
Boston	0	0	15	0	565	1919	22.75%	0									

== 2018 Ladder ==
Port Lincoln	Wins	Byes	Losses	Draws	For	Against	%	Pts	Final	Team	G	B	Pts	Team	G	B	Pts
Marble Range	13	0	2	0	1480	623	70.38%	26	1st Semi	Tasman	17	7	109	Mallee Park	7	9	51
Wayback	12	0	3	0	1277	733	63.53%	24	2nd Semi	Wayback	12	15	87	Marble Range	7	8	50
Tasman	10	0	5	0	1378	737	65.15%	20	Preliminary	Tasman	14	8	92	Marble Range	7	6	48
Mallee Park	7	0	8	0	1143	1204	48.70%	14	Grand	Tasman	14	9	93	Wayback	7	13	55
Lincoln South	3	0	12	0	684	1219	35.94%	6									
Boston	0	0	15	0	580	2026	22.26%	0									

== Books ==
- Encyclopedia of South Australian country football clubs / compiled by Peter Lines. ISBN 9780980447293
- South Australian country football digest / by Peter Lines ISBN 9780987159199
