= CKD =

CKD may refer to:

- Chiara Costanza, under her DJ alias Chiara Kickdrum
- Chronic kidney disease, a slowly progressive loss of renal function
- ČKD (Českomoravská Kolben-Daněk), an engineering company in the Czech Republic
- Complete knock down, a complete kit needed to assemble a product
- Count Key Data, a disk architecture used in IBM mainframe computers
- Crooked Creek Airport in Alaska, United States (IATA airport code)
