= Mallee Park Football Club =

Australian football club

Mallee Park

Names
- Full name: Mallee Park Football Club
- Nickname(s): Peckers
- Former nickname(s): Woodpeckers

2021 season
- After finals: DNQ
- Home-and-away season: 5th

Club details
- Founded: 1981; 44 years ago
- Colours
- Competition: Port Lincoln Football League
- President: Graham Johncock
- Premierships: PLFL (16); 1985 1987 1988 1989 1990 1993 1994 1995 1996 1999 2001 2009 2010 2011 2015 2016
- Ground(s): Mallee Park, Port Lincoln

The Mallee Park Football Club is an all indigenous Australian rules football club that plays football in the Port Lincoln Football League in Port Lincoln, South Australia. The clubs most famous for having 13 players with links to the club making it to the big stage in the AFL; with the notable likes including Shaun Burgoyne, Eddie Betts and Byron Pickett.

== Club achievements ==
Club achievements
Competition	Level	Num.	Year won
Port Lincoln Football League	Premiers	16	1985, 1987, 1988, 1989, 1990, 1993, 1994, 1995, 1996, 1999, 2001, 2009, 2010, 2011, 2015, 2016
Port Lincoln Football League	Runners Up	14	1982, 1983, 1984, 1986, 1991, 1992, 1997, 2000, 2005, 2007, 2008, 2012, 2014, 2019

== 1985 (first premiership) ==
Being founded only in 1981, the Peckers still managed to make the grand final for 3 consecutive years in 1982, 83 and 84 but just falling short. However, this did not stop Mallee Park from powering through the 1985 season to beat Waybacks by 24 points in a high scoring affair which reversed the results of the previous grand final in 1984 where Waybacks defeated Mallee Park. The premiership side included some big names: featuring people like Harry Miller Snr (father of Harry Miller Jnr) as coach who also played in the forward-line, Eddie Betts II (Father of Eddie Betts III) and Byron Picket Snr (Father of Byron Picket Jnr). This premiership is what would kick off the start of the Mallee Park dynasty where from 1985 to 2001 they would make 16 grand finals, winning 11 of them.
