= Shaun Burgoyne =

Australian rules footballer (born 1982)

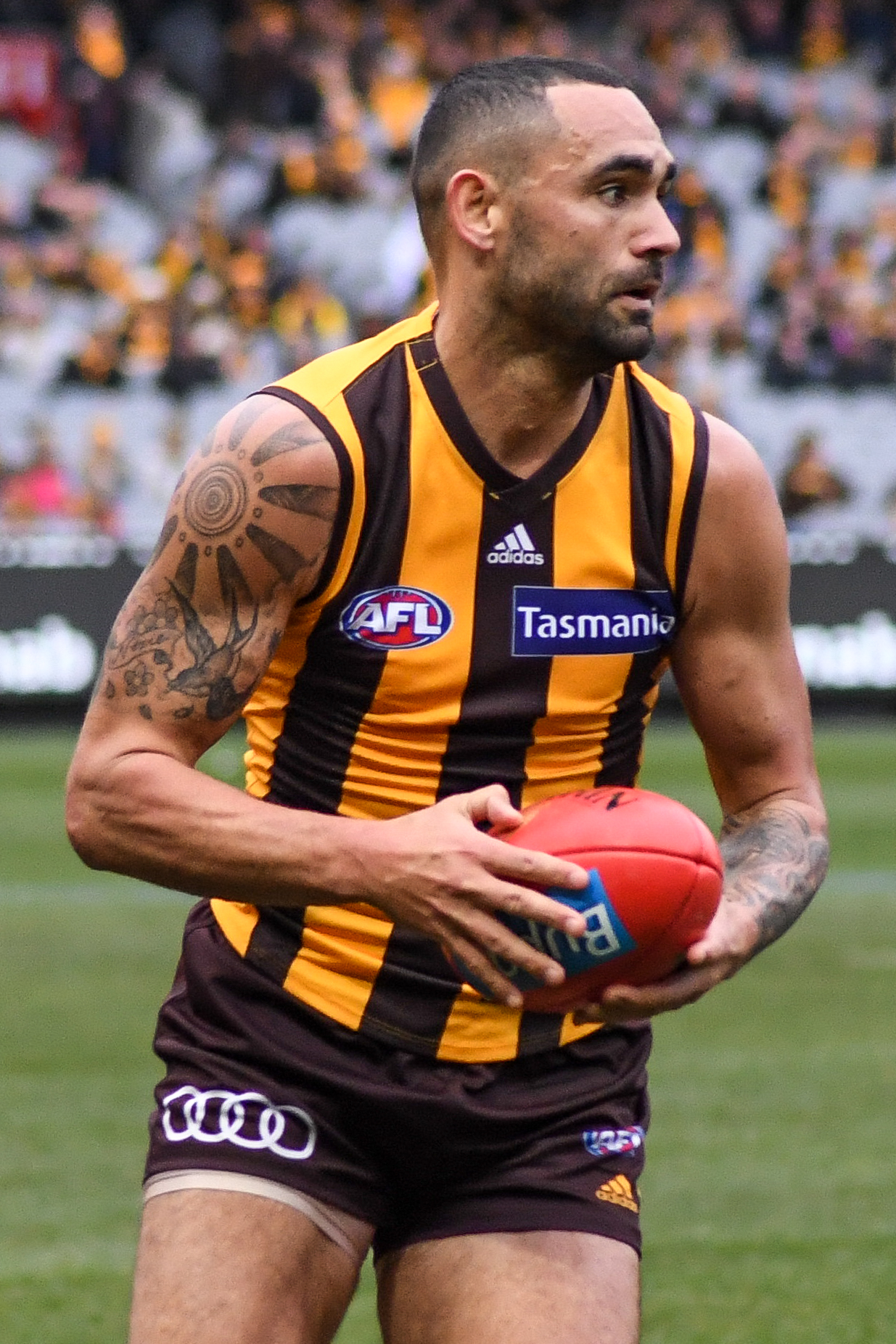
- Burgoyne playing for Hawthorn in August 2018

Personal information
- Full name: Shaun Playford Burgoyne
- Nicknames: Silk, Burgers
- Born: 21 October 1982 (age 44); Darwin, Northern Territory
- Original team: Port Adelaide (SANFL)
- Draft: No. 12, 2000 national draft
- Debut: Round 3, 2002, Port Adelaide vs. St Kilda, at Colonial Stadium
- Height: 186 cm (6 ft 1 in)
- Weight: 89 kg (196 lb)
- Position: Utility

Playing career^{1}
Years	Club	Games (Goals)
2001–2009	Port Adelaide	157 (171)
2010–2021	Hawthorn	250 (131)
Total		407 (302)

Representative team honours^{2}
Years	Team	Games (Goals)
2005–2015	Indigenous All-Stars	4 (0)
2008	Dream Team	1 (1)

International team honours^{2}
2008–2017	Australia	4 (1)
- ^{1} Playing statistics correct to the end of 2021.^{2} Representative statistics correct as of 2017.

Career highlights
- 4× AFL Premiership player: 2004, 2013–2015; All-Australian team: 2006; Showdown Medal: round 20, 2005

Shaun Playford Burgoyne (born 21 October 1982) is a former Australian rules footballer who played for the Port Adelaide Football Club and Hawthorn Football Club in the Australian Football League (AFL).

Burgoyne was the first Indigenous Australian player in elite Australian rules football (the VFL/AFL, the SANFL and the WAFL) to reach the 400-game milestone, as well as the fifth player overall in the VFL/AFL, and the seventh player overall in elite Australian rules football. He was also the first VFL/AFL player to have reached the milestone playing for two different clubs.

With 35 AFL finals appearances, Burgoyne also had the third-most finals appearances of any VFL/AFL footballer, behind only Michael Tuck's 39 and Joel Selwood’s 40. Burgoyne also played four finals matches in the SANFL, with his total of 39 finals appearances across the SANFL and AFL the third most in elite Australian rules football, behind Selwood's 40 and Peter Carey's 43.

== Early life ==
Burgoyne, of Kokatha and Awarai ancestry, was born in Darwin, Northern Territory the son of former Port Adelaide (SANFL) player Peter Burgoyne Snr and younger brother of former Port Adelaide player Peter Burgoyne. He was raised in Darwin, in a house in Leanyer that he still likes to drive past on trips back to the Northern Territory. Burgoyne moved away from Darwin when he was young and moved to the small city of Port Lincoln in the Eyre Peninsula region of South Australia. He played his junior football for Mallee Park in the Port Lincoln Football League where he played alongside AFL greats such as Eddie Betts, Lindsay Thomas, Byron Picket and Graham Johncock.

He is of Indigenous Australian descent and his ancestry can be traced to the Kokatha clan.

== AFL career ==
=== Port Adelaide career (2001–2009) ===
Drafted with pick 12 in the 2000 national draft, Burgoyne would have to wait a year to make his AFL debut in round 3, 2002 against St Kilda. He had been a steady contributor across the forward line for Port Adelaide, before becoming a rebounding defender to great effect.

In 2004, Burgoyne played every game for the season and was part of Port Adelaide's inaugural AFL premiership.

After a series of midfield performances that culminated with selection to the All Australian Team in 2006, he was described by retiring Port player Josh Francou as being "as good as Judd".

Burgoyne was important in Port Adelaide's midfield in 2008, despite attracting the opposition's best tagger most weeks. While not reaching the heights of past seasons, he finished fourth in the best and fairest and was second at the club in centre clearances, tackles and inside 50s, and fourth in goals (23), contested possessions and bounces. 2009 was a disappointing year after injuring his knee in round three and missing three months of football. He was able to come back and play a few good games late in the year.

Burgoyne was Port Adelaide’s highest paid player and Vice-Captain at the end of the 2009 season.

=== Hawthorn career (2010–2021) ===
As vice-captain, he shocked Port Adelaide by requesting a trade to play for a Victorian team in 2010 after his brother retired. Port traded him to Hawthorn in a complicated deal involving four clubs, with Essendon and Geelong also involved. He was allocated former club champion Shane Crawford's No. 9 jumper.

After having surgery on his knee during the offseason that delayed his preparation for the 2010 season, Burgoyne suffered a broken jaw while playing for Box Hill, and later suffered a hamstring injury. Despite these injuries, he made his debut against Richmond in Round 8, 2010, and played the last sixteen games of the season.

During 2011, Shaun Burgoyne played excellent football for Hawthorn, showcasing his disposal and running skills. He was part of a side that lost the preliminary final to eventual runners-up Collingwood by three points.

Burgoyne was part of Hawthorn's losing side in the 2012 AFL Grand Final. In 2013, Burgoyne's performance in the Preliminary Final against Geelong saw him kick three goals and also provide goals assists, with his final goal putting Hawthorn back in front late in the fourth quarter. The match ended the 11-game losing streak against Geelong that had been active since Hawthorns' 2008 Grand Final win over them.

On 28 September 2013, Burgoyne became a dual Premiership player after Hawthorn defeated Fremantle in the Grand Final in front of 100,007 fans at the MCG: Burgoyne was the only player to remain completely in his game outfit when the players were presented on stage following the conclusion of the post-match concert.

With Hawthorn's victories in the 2014 and 2015 Grand Finals, completing a hat-trick, Burgoyne became a quadruple Premiership player.

On 24 May 2017, it was announced that he would wear number 67 on his guernsey, rather than his usual 9, for the round 10 Sir Doug Nicholls Round (the "Indigenous Round") game against Sydney, to commemorate the 1967 referendum which allowed Indigenous Australians to be counted with the general population in the census.

On 28 August 2017, Burgoyne signed a one-year contract extension with Hawthorn keeping him at the club until the end of 2018. In November, he was appointed captain of the Australian international rules football team for the 2017 series.

Burgoyne signed another contract extension to cover the 2019 season in August 2018.

In 2019, Burgoyne was heavily linked to a move to the Gold Coast. Burgoyne himself addressed the speculation, admitting it had been stressful and that he had a big decision to make. On 12 September, it was announced he would remain a Hawk for 2020.

At the end of the 2020 season, Burgoyne signed a one-year deal extending his career into a twentieth season in the AFL, and announced that it would be his last.

As of 2025, Burgoyne ranks fourth for most VFL/AFL games, behind Scott Pendlebury (425), Michael Tuck (426) and Brent Harvey (432), and ranks second for most premiership games in elite Australian rules football with 433 (including his 26 SANFL games for Port Adelaide), only behind Craig Bradley (464, including 89 games in the SANFL with Port Adelaide).

=== Other matches ===
Burgoyne also played 26 pre-season/night series matches, one State Of Origin match for the Dream Team in 2008, four matches for the Indigenous All-Stars, and four International Rules matches. If these are considered, Burgoyne played a total of 468 career senior games.

=== Post-playing media career 2022- ===
On 7 March 2022 it was announced that Shaun would join Channel 7's commentary team as a boundary rider. On 26 October 2024 it was announced that Shaun would join Fox Footy's commentary team in an unknown capacity.

== Off-field representation ==
Off the field, Burgoyne has become an important representative for the Indigenous Australian sporting community. He was an inaugural member of the Indigenous Players Advisory Board when it was established in 2011 and was appointed Chair of the Board in 2016.

He was also a regular guest on The Marngrook Footy Show.

== Personal life ==
Burgoyne is married to Amy née Phillips, who is the daughter of Port Adelaide legend Greg Phillips and sister of WNBA and AFLW superstar Erin Phillips. Together they have four children – Nixie, Leni, Ky and Percy.

== Statistics ==
Legend
G	Goals	K	Kicks	D	Disposals	T	Tackles
B	Behinds	H	Handballs	M	Marks
#	Played in that season's premiership team

Season	Team	No.	Games	Totals							Averages (per game)							Votes
Season	Team	No.	Games	G	B	K	H	D	M	T	G	B	K	H	D	M	T	Votes
2001	Port Adelaide	37	0	—	—	—	—	—	—	—	—	—	—	—	—	—	—	0
2002	Port Adelaide	8	17	24	11	86	58	144	32	41	1.4	0.6	5.1	3.4	8.5	1.9	2.4	3
2003	Port Adelaide	8	25	39	17	174	106	280	76	66	1.6	0.7	7.0	4.2	11.2	3.0	2.6	1
2004^{#}	Port Adelaide	8	25	18	14	215	130	345	77	79	0.7	0.6	8.6	5.2	13.8	3.1	3.2	1
2005	Port Adelaide	8	15	4	4	159	118	277	76	29	0.3	0.3	10.6	7.9	18.5	5.1	1.9	7
2006	Port Adelaide	8	22	20	16	265	193	458	87	115	0.9	0.7	12.0	8.8	20.8	4.0	5.2	15
2007	Port Adelaide	8	25	39	23	271	201	472	62	94	1.6	0.9	10.8	8.0	18.9	2.5	3.8	16
2008	Port Adelaide	8	19	23	12	216	168	384	66	81	1.2	0.6	11.4	8.8	20.2	3.5	4.3	6
2009	Port Adelaide	8	9	4	10	100	75	175	33	35	0.4	1.1	11.1	8.3	19.4	3.7	3.9	0
2010	Hawthorn	9	16	7	3	172	187	359	58	89	0.4	0.2	10.8	11.7	22.4	3.6	5.6	7
2011	Hawthorn	9	24	16	9	230	212	442	90	77	0.7	0.4	9.6	8.8	18.4	3.8	3.2	0
2012	Hawthorn	9	24	11	5	246	182	428	83	82	0.5	0.2	10.3	7.6	17.8	3.5	3.4	6
2013^{#}	Hawthorn	9	23	18	6	258	203	461	81	86	0.8	0.3	11.2	8.8	20.0	3.5	3.7	3
2014^{#}	Hawthorn	9	25	12	6	284	266	550	95	95	0.5	0.2	11.4	10.6	22.0	3.8	3.8	3
2015^{#}	Hawthorn	9	26	9	7	244	260	504	92	102	0.4	0.3	9.4	10.0	19.4	3.5	3.9	2
2016	Hawthorn	9	24	15	12	262	216	478	93	134	0.6	0.5	10.9	9.0	19.9	3.9	5.6	8
2017	Hawthorn	9/67	22	17	10	216	232	448	93	87	0.8	0.5	9.8	10.5	20.4	4.2	4.0	5
2018	Hawthorn	9	17	7	13	165	151	316	64	72	0.4	0.8	9.8	8.9	18.6	3.8	4.2	0
2019	Hawthorn	9	18	7	3	175	117	292	77	65	0.4	0.2	9.7	6.5	16.2	4.3	3.6	0
2020 (Note: The 2020 season was played with 17 home-and-away matches per team (down from 22) and 16-minute quarters with time on (down from 20-minute quarters with time on) due to the impact of the COVID-19 pandemic.)	Hawthorn	9	13	11	2	77	62	139	26	32	0.8	0.2	5.9	4.8	10.7	2.0	2.5	2
2021	Hawthorn	9	18	1	1	133	84	217	46	31	0.1	0.1	7.4	4.7	12.1	2.6	1.7	0
Career			407	302	184	3948	3221	7169	1407	1492	0.7	0.5	9.7	7.9	17.6	3.5	3.7	85

== Honours and achievements ==
Team

- AFL premiership player (Port Adelaide): 2004
- 3× AFL premiership player (Hawthorn): 2013, 2014, 2015
- 3× Minor premiership (Port Adelaide): 2002, 2003, 2004
- 2× Minor premiership (Hawthorn): 2012, 2013

Individual

- All-Australian team: 2006
- Showdown Medal: Round 20, 2005
- Hawthorn most consistent player: 2014
- 2× Australia international rules football team: 2008, 2017
- Australia international rules football team captain: 2017
- 4× Indigenous All-Stars team: 2005, 2007, 2009, 2015
- Indigenous All-Stars captain: 2015
- Polly Farmer Medal: 2015
- Dream Team Australian rules football team: 2008
- Hawthorn Football Club Life Member
- Port Adelaide Football Club Life Member

== See also ==
- List of VFL/AFL players to have played 300 games
- List of VFL/AFL players to have played 200 games for one club
