= Centenary Oval =

Sports venue in Port Lincoln, South Australia

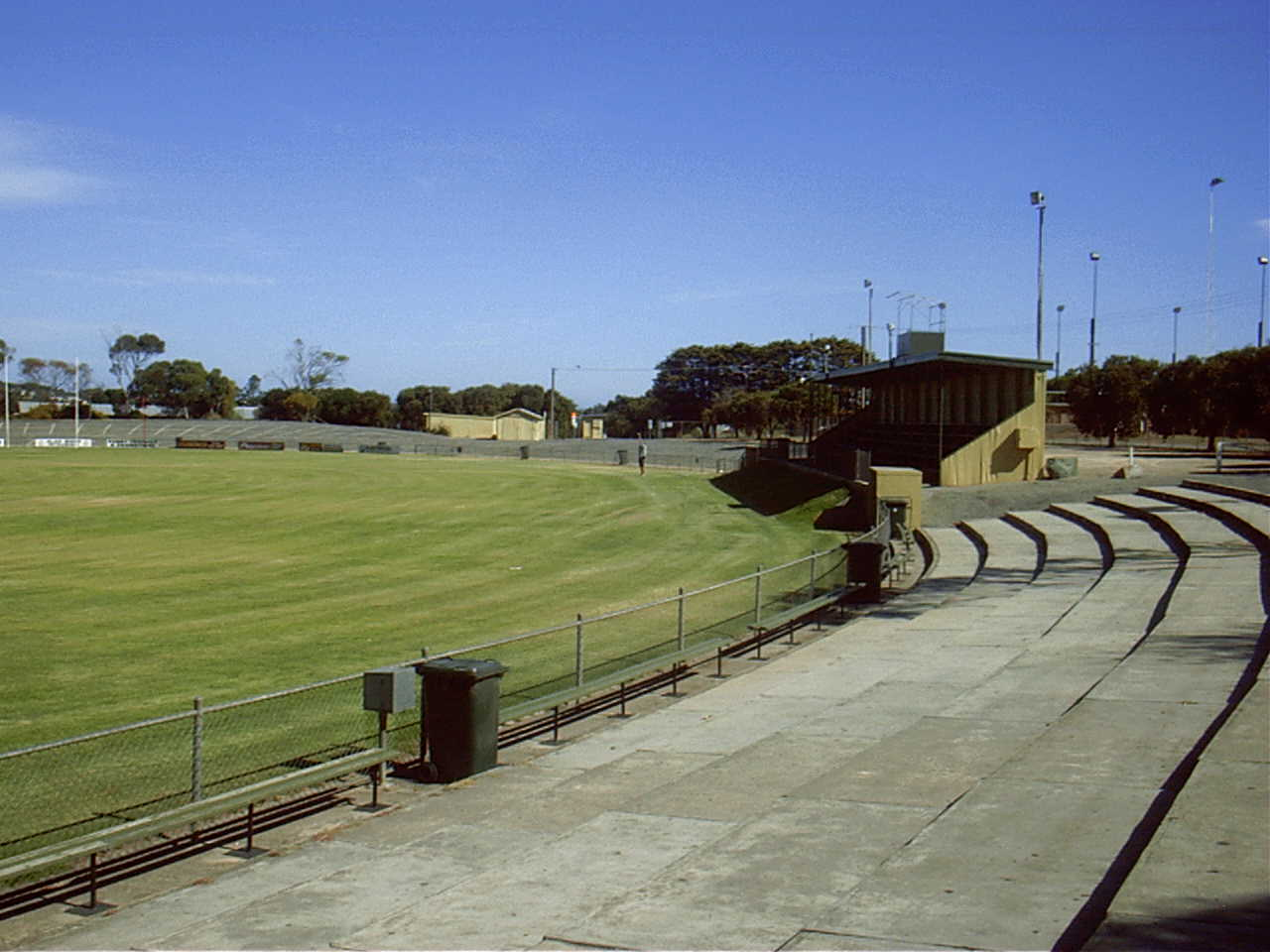
- Centenary Oval in 2003
- Interactive map of Centenary Oval
- Address: 1A New West Road; Port Lincoln, South Australia
- Coordinates: 34.72078888604777°S 135.85559971859666°E
- Owner: City of Port Lincoln
- Capacity: 7,500 (225 seated)

Construction
- Opened: 1936; 90 years ago

Centenary Oval is an Australian rules football and cricket venue in the South Australian city of Port Lincoln. It is used by the Port Lincoln Football League (PLFL) and the Port Lincoln Cricket Association (PLCA). Two PLFL clubs – Lincoln South and Wayback – play home matches at the venue.

The venue was opened in 1936, with a turf cricket pitch – the only one on the Eyre Peninsula at the time – laid two years later. The first international cricket match played at the venue was between South Australia and South Africa, while England also played there in 1963. Don Bradman, widely acknowledged as the greatest batsman of all time, played on the ground in October 1939, where he was bowled for one run by local player Tom Mahoney.

In 2005, an Australian Football League (AFL) pre-season match was played at Centenary Oval, with Adelaide defeating Geelong by two points in front of a crowd of 7,662 people. Ten years later in 2015, the venue hosted an AFL pre-season match for the second time, which saw Adelaide defeat North Melbourne.

The venue underwent redevelopment in 2013 with the construction of a new grandstand, which features undercover seating for 225 people.

Since 2022, the Norwood Football Club have played one South Australian National Football League (SANFL) match at Centenary Oval every season.
