= Byron Pickett =

Australian rules footballer (born 1977)

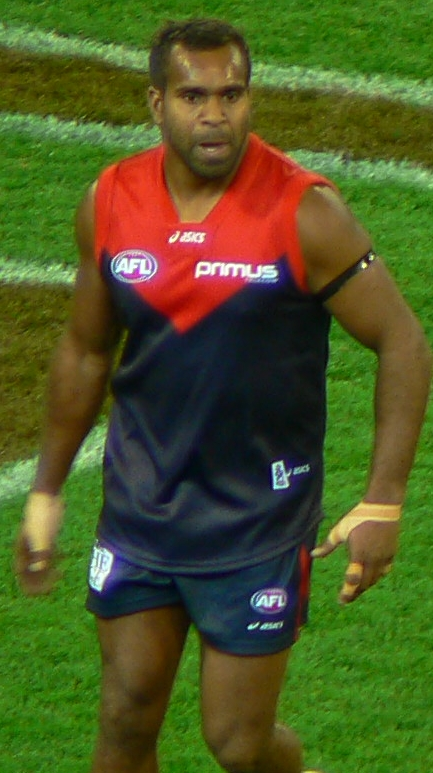
- Pickett playing for Melbourne in 2007

Personal information
- Full name: Byron Pickett
- Nickname: Choppy
- Born: 11 August 1977 (age 49); Kellerberrin, Western Australia
- Original team: Port Adelaide (SANFL)
- Height: 178 cm (5 ft 10 in)
- Weight: 88 kg (194 lb)

Playing career^{1}
Years	Club	Games (Goals)
1997–2002	North Melbourne	120 (81)
2003–2005	Port Adelaide	55 (80)
2006–2007	Melbourne	29 (16)
Total		204 (177)

Representative team honours^{2}
Years	Team	Games (Goals)
1998–1999	South Australia	2 (?)
- ^{1} Playing statistics correct to the end of 2007.^{2} Representative statistics correct as of 1999.

Career highlights
- AFL Premiership player: 1999, 2004; Norm Smith Medal: 2004; All-Australian: 1999; AFL Rising Star: 1998; Indigenous Team of the Century

Byron Pickett (born 11 August 1977) is a former professional Australian rules footballer who played for the North Melbourne Football Club, Port Adelaide Football Club and Melbourne Football Club in the Australian Football League (AFL). He was known as a big game player as well as for his strength, hard bumps and tough approach to the game. Pickett is one of 12 players with two premiership medallions, a Norm Smith Medal and over 200 AFL games. In 2005, Pickett was acknowledged as one of the finest Aboriginal players in the history of the game, with his selection to the Indigenous Team of the Century. He announced his retirement from AFL at the end of the 2007 season.

After his retirement from the AFL in 2007, he continued playing semi-professionally, including some time with the Port Adelaide Magpies in the South Australian National Football League (SANFL).

He is the uncle of fellow Melbourne player Kysaiah Pickett. Byron's cousin Thomas was the father of Richmond player Marlion Pickett.

== Early life ==
Born in Kellerberrin in country Western Australia to Indigenous Australian parents, Byron Pickett grew up in Tammin and then Geraldton, Western Australia, before moving to Port Lincoln in South Australia. Pickett played the majority of his junior football for Port Lincoln Football League club Mallee Park, which was also the junior club of leading footballers like Peter and Shaun Burgoyne, Graham Johncock and Daniel Wells. Pickett's skills were identified by South Australian National Football League (SANFL) club Port Adelaide and Pickett began to play in Port's junior sides, making the long trip each weekend to Adelaide.

Although Pickett never played higher than the under-19s with Port Adelaide, Port senior coach John Cahill was eager to name Pickett in Port Adelaide's squad for their inaugural Australian Football League (AFL) season in 1997. However, Pickett, citing homesickness, turned down this offer, although he later nominated for the 1996 AFL draft, where he was taken by North Melbourne.

== AFL career ==
=== North Melbourne (1997–2002) ===
Nicknamed "Choppy", Pickett burst onto the scene in 1997 with the North Melbourne Football Club, playing only one game. However, in 1998, he had a fine year and was rewarded with the Norwich Rising Star award.

At only 178 cm and 86 kg, Pickett was not a large Australian Rules player, however he is solidly built and unquestionably tough. Pickett developed a reputation as a 'tough' player for his aggressive attack on the ball, with a frequent tendency to cause opponents serious injuries. Pickett was known for hard bumps and was consequently suspended three times from 2001.

Kickett was known to kick clutch torpedo goals during his tenure at the Kangaroos.

In 1999, he played in a premiership team with the Kangaroos, before switching to the club he originally played for in the SANFL, Port Adelaide Football Club, in 2002.

In the last days of his playing career with North Melbourne, he famously broke the collarbone of Geelong's Darren Milburn in a hard clash.

=== Port Adelaide (2003–2005) ===
He moved to Port Adelaide in 2003, a season in which he kicked 43 goals in 25 games (2nd on the list of top goal kickers in 2003). He was part of Port Adelaide's first-ever AFL premiership in 2004, and his 3-goal, 20 possession performance earned him the Norm Smith Medal. At the end of the 2005 season Pickett was traded to Melbourne, finishing a short but successful stint at Port Adelaide.

=== Melbourne (2006–2007) ===
At the end of 2005, Pickett was involved in a trade that saw him play at the Melbourne Football Club from 2006 onwards, and he has vowed not to alter his style of play. He wore No 33, previously worn by former Aboriginal player Jeff Farmer.

In a Round 7, 2006, clash with Fremantle at the MCG, Pickett sent Ryan Crowley to hospital with a broken cheekbone.

Pickett suffered successive hamstring injuries in 2006 which sidelined him for several games.

2007 began slowly for Pickett, not selected in the initial rounds due to poor pre-season match fitness; however, he returned in Round 4. In April, he laid a heavy tackle on Tadhg Kennelly which tore Kenelly's anterior cruciate ligament. On 5 May 2007, Pickett laid a strong tackle on Port Adelaide's Kane Cornes, which left him concussed and taken from the ground on a stretcher.

After Round 6 in 2007, the Demons suspended Pickett to a minimum of four weeks at the Sandringham Football Club for the official reason of failing to attend a game. Unofficially, there were club concerns surrounding Pickett's weight and pre-season work ethic and him turning up to training under the influence of alcohol.

Despite drawing criticism late in his career for being increasingly overweight and slow, he maintained an impact in matches, continuing to score goals and make game-turning plays.

Byron Pickett announced his last game of football on Sunday 2 September, in the match against Carlton, retiring along with Demons teammates Clint Bizzell and Nathan Brown. He kicked a goal in his final game against the Blues.

== Controversy ==
In 1999, Pickett crashed into Hawthorn's Brendan Krummel while his head was down to get the ball. In the bump, Pickett broke Krummel's nose; Krummel was concussed and had short-term amnesia. A free kick was awarded but no official charge was laid from the AFL. Despite his injuries, Krummel publicly defended Pickett's actions.

In 2000, Byron was admitted to a mental health clinic with fears of Attention Deficit Hyperactivity Disorder (ADHD) and other mental illnesses. Pickett was released from the clinic with reports that his mental health was fine.

In 2005, he received a six-week suspension for a clash which accidentally knocked out James Begley in a pre-season match with both players chasing for the ball. The incident sparked controversy; and, in response, many football commentators, including premiership player Robert Walls, controversially called to ban the bump. Many cynics felt that Pickett had been singled out over the incident and his style of play unfairly made an example of, with the rules changing in response to the incident.

He received a two-week suspension for a hip-and-shoulder on Carlton's Simon Wiggins as he completed a mark, after slowing down and pulling up to reduce the collision. In the 2005 semi-final between Adelaide and Port Adelaide, a bump on Adelaide Football Club's Rhett Biglands knocked the 104 kg ruckman out cold, seeing Biglands stretchered from the field. However, he was not suspended for the collision.

Pickett has also made numerous appearances in court-related to drink-driving offences.

In 2007, Pickett was suspended by Melbourne for failure to attend a game against the Western Bulldogs; he was listed as an emergency. It was later revealed he sent a phone text message to his coach Neale Daniher to inform him that he was too hungover to play.

== Post-AFL career ==
Following his AFL retirement, Pickett was rumoured to be approached by several Victorian country football clubs, including Port Fairy in the southwestern Victorian-based Hampden Football League. Eventually, Pickett returned to Port Adelaide in the SANFL for 2008 and 2009. Pickett is also involved with the club's Football Academy Program with a specific focus on mentoring some of the young Aboriginal players in this program.

== Statistics ==
Legend
G	Goals	K	Kicks	D	Disposals	T	Tackles
B	Behinds	H	Handballs	M	Marks
#	Played in that season's premiership team

Season	Team	No.	Games	Totals							Averages (per game)							Votes
Season	Team	No.	Games	G	B	K	H	D	M	T	G	B	K	H	D	M	T	Votes
1997	North Melbourne	28	1	0	0	1	1	2	0	0	0.0	0.0	1.0	1.0	2.0	0.0	0.0	0
1998	North Melbourne	28	25	0	3	211	94	305	64	71	0.0	0.1	8.4	3.8	12.2	2.6	2.8	3
1999^{#}	Kangaroos	28	25	0	2	294	95	389	69	48	0.0	0.1	11.8	3.8	15.6	2.8	1.9	11
2000	Kangaroos	28	25	4	3	263	92	355	76	73	0.2	0.1	10.5	3.7	14.2	3.0	2.9	1
2001	Kangaroos	28	22	37	10	201	88	289	72	96	1.7	0.5	9.1	4.0	13.1	3.3	4.4	4
2002	Kangaroos	28	22	40	20	175	56	231	73	73	1.8	0.9	8.0	2.5	10.5	3.3	3.3	5
2003	Port Adelaide	15	25	43	25	225	84	309	92	75	1.7	1.0	9.0	3.4	12.4	3.7	3.0	8
2004^{#}	Port Adelaide	15	15	20	11	109	44	153	45	34	1.3	0.7	7.3	2.9	10.2	3.0	2.3	0
2005	Port Adelaide	15	15	17	9	128	41	169	49	25	1.1	0.6	8.5	2.7	11.3	3.3	1.7	0
2006	Melbourne	33	20	9	7	215	80	295	102	45	0.5	0.4	10.8	4.0	14.8	5.1	2.3	5
2007	Melbourne	33	9	7	3	64	19	83	26	30	0.8	0.3	7.1	2.1	9.2	2.9	3.3	0
Career			204	177	93	1886	694	2580	668	570	0.9	0.5	9.2	3.4	12.6	3.3	2.8	37

== Honours and achievements ==
=== Team ===
North Melbourne/Kangaroos

- AFL Premiership (Kangaroos): 1999
- McClelland Trophy (North Melbourne): 1998
- Pre-Season Cup (North Melbourne): 1998

Port Adelaide

- AFL Premiership (Port Adelaide): 2004
- McClelland Trophy (Port Adelaide): 2003, 2004

=== Individual ===
- Norm Smith Medal: 2004
- All-Australian: 1999
- Indigenous All-Stars Representative Honours: 2005, 2007
- AFL Rising Star Award: 1998
- AFL Rising Star Nominee: 1998 (Round 3)
