= Reckless (Australian TV series) =

Australian TV series

- Created by: Kodie Bedford
- Based on: Guilt by Neil Forsyth
- Written by: Kodie Bedford; Stuart Page
- Directed by: Beck Cole
- Starring: Tasma Walton; Hunter Page-Lochard; Jessica De Gouw; Clarence Ryan
- Music by: Allegra Caldwell (supervisor)
- No. of series: 1
- No. of episodes: 4

Production
- Producers: Kodie Bedford; Andrew Walker
- Cinematography: Murray Lui
- Editor: Kasra Rassoulzadegan
- Running time: 60 min.
- Production company: BBC Studios Productions Australia

Original release
- Network: SBS Television & NITV
- Release: 12 November – 3 December 2025

Reckless is a 2025 Australian four-part comedy crime drama series starring Tasma Walton and Hunter Page-Lochard.

At the 2026 Screen Music Awards, music by Cassie To and Emma Greenhill was nominated for Best Music for a Television Drama.

== Synopsis ==
Brother and sister Charlie and June are driving home from a wedding when they hit an old man with terminal cancer who has wandered onto the road, killing him. They decide to return the man to his home and just leave him in his armchair, to hide their involvement in his death.

== Cast ==
- Tasma Walton as June
- Hunter Page-Lochard as Charlie, June's brother
- Jessica De Gouw as Sharne
- Clarence Ryan as Roddy
- Jane Harber as Kate
- Tracy Mann as Valda
- Duncan Fellows as Rex
- Peter Rowsthorn
- Steve Le Marquand
- Kelton Pell
- Maddie Young
- Perry Mooney
- Ethan Gosatti
- David Wyatt as George

== Production ==
The series was based on the 2019 Scottish series Guilt, by Neil Forsyth, but has been reworked. The story was adapted, with several changes, and co-written by Kodie Bedford and Stuart Page. The series was cast, created, and produced by Indigenous Australian creatives. Beck Cole directed, and the series was co-produced by Kodie Bedford (who also acts as an executive producer, with Kylie Watson) and Andrew Walker and edited by Kasra Rassoulzadegan. Cinematography was by Murray Lui. Allegra Caldwell was music supervisor on the series.

The producing studio was BBC Studios Productions Australia, who produced for SBS and NITV. Major investment came from Screenwest and the Western Australian Production Attraction Incentive; Screen Australia's First Nations Department; and SBS / NITV, in association with Screen NSW.

The series was filmed entirely on location in Fremantle and Perth, in Western Australia. Lead actress Tasma Walton commented that an important feature of the series for locals, is "the specificity of being located in Western Australia. There are wonderful subcultural references that so many West Australians will get", and also: "These Aboriginal characters are simply existing in their world the best they can, sometimes making questionable choices in their fight for survival. Just human beings trying to get by in a crazy, crazy world".

== Release ==
The four 60-minute episodes of Reckless premiered at 8.30pm on 12 November on SBS Television and on NITV, with all episodes available on SBS On Demand.

Global distribution is planned. Federation Studios, based in Paris, acquired the distribution rights, marking its first Australian drama, and showcased the series to international buyers at MIPCOM in Cannes on 12 October 2025.

Reckless aired on ITV1 and ITVX in the UK from 6 September 2026.

== Reception ==
Stephen Russell, writing for ScreenHub, gave the series 4.5 stars out of 5, calling it "the best Australian comedy of the year". He compared it to Deadloch, writing: "Cole and the writers revel in June and Charlie’s increasingly daft cover-up of the cluster-fucking mess they’ve made infinitely worse". He also praises the cinematography, editing, and soundtrack.

David Knox, of TV Tonight, gave the series 4 stars out of 5, commenting that it is "one of the best Australian dramas of the year... Or is it a comedy thriller?", and, "If Reckless were on Netflix you’d be recommending it to friends".

Kyle Laidlaw of TV Blackbox calls Reckless a "deadly funny new Australian drama", and comments "the series brings the grit, humour and heart of Western Australia to the screen, with Fremantle itself playing a starring role".

Alexa Scarlata, writing for The Conversation, liked the way the series showcases Fremantle as a location, and singled out Clarence Ryan's performance as Roddy for particular praise. She wrote that it is the "kind of Australian storytelling with the potential to resonate with local audiences and travel well internationally as part of the popular crime mystery genre".

Natasha Lee, writing for Mediaweek: "The production doesn't treat Fremantle as set dressing; it treats it almost like family: flawed, funny, historic, stubborn", and "It's a portrait of place and people stitched with humour, grit and a kind of emotional honesty television rarely gives them space to show.

Australian Guardian critic Luke Buckmaster gives the series an "honourable mention" in his list of recommendations on streaming services in November. After its release in the UK in September 2026, The Guardian's Lucy Mangan called it a "a fantastic, fun ride grounded by a realistically fractious but at heart loving relationship between the siblings, the light but piercing commentary on the wider racial and socioeconomic dynamics at work in Australia that illuminate rather than halt the action... a masterpiece of control", rating it 5 out of 5 stars.
