= Long Story Short (film) =

2021 Australian romantic comedy film

- Film poster
- Directed by: Josh Lawson
- Written by: Josh Lawson
- Produced by: Michael Pontin; Isabel Stanfield; Jamie Hilton
- Starring: Rafe Spall; Zahra Newman; Ronny Chieng; Dena Kaplan; Noni Hazlehurst
- Cinematography: Matt Toll
- Edited by: Kasra Rassoulzadegan
- Music by: Chiara Costanza
- Production companies: StudioCanal; Screen Australia; See Pictures
- Distributed by: StudioCanal (Note: It was released in Australia by StudioCanal and by Saban Films in the United States)
- Release dates: 11 February 2021 (Australia); 2 July 2021 (United States)
- Running time: 100 minutes
- Country: Australia
- Language: English
- Box office: $2.3 million

Long Story Short is a 2021 Australian romantic comedy film written and directed by Josh Lawson about a man who wakes up the morning after his wedding to discover that every few minutes he is jumping forward in time. It was released on 11 February 2021 in Australia by StudioCanal and in the United States by Saban Films on 2 July 2021. It is loosely based on the Indian film Baar Baar Dekho (2016).

== Plot ==
At a New Year's Eve party, Teddy races to kiss his girlfriend Becka by midnight. By mistake, he kisses another woman named Leanne who is wearing the same dress. Leanne helps Teddy when he goes into anaphylactic shock from inadvertently consuming a peanut that was in Leanne's mouth, and the two begin a relationship. A few years later, Teddy and Leanne visit Teddy's father's grave to give him the news that Teddy has proposed using the ring he personally crafted for Teddy's mother, though they haven't set a date. A strange woman overhears them and cautions Teddy against wasting his life and gives him a wedding gift of a tin can, with the instruction not to open it until his tenth anniversary, for which the traditional gift is tin.

The morning after the wedding, Teddy wakes up to discover that exactly one year has passed and Leanne is 18 weeks pregnant. A few minutes later, time shifts to their second anniversary and he is the father of a baby girl who, much to his shock, is named Talullah. Teddy realizes that time is passing normally for everyone but him, and asks his best friend Sam to meet him in one year with an anniversary present, which he does. They theorize that Teddy's predicament is similar to that in the film Groundhog Day, and that Teddy must have a "perfect day" to break the curse. In the intervening year, Teddy and Leanne have begun couples' counselling and their therapist has asked them to write letters to each other. Leanne feels that Teddy isn't the man she married, as he spends all his time at work. Teddy promises he can change, but the letter he wrote betrays the resentment he feels at being forced to be the family breadwinner instead of pursuing his dream of photography, while Leanne chases a "pipe dream" of being a writer.

On Teddy and Leanne's fourth anniversary, Teddy is shocked to find Leanne gone; they have agreed to a trial separation. Worse, Sam has been diagnosed with skin cancer, and Teddy is shocked by his weight and hair loss. On their fifth anniversary, Teddy wakes up from a night with his ex Becka, whose marriage has also fallen apart and who Teddy has been seeing casually for a few months. Teddy rushes Becka onto the terrace when Leanne drops by wanting to get back together. They almost have sex, but Leanne walks out upon finding Becka's bra on the couch. Becka vows to stop seeing Teddy, but they are still together a year later. Teddy wonders what keeps bringing them together when they're clearly wrong for each other, and Becka sadly notes that she would have been able to save her marriage if she had the knowledge then that she has now.

Teddy visits Leanne and is surprised to learn that she is the owner of a Great Dane puppy (a dog Teddy disliked) and is dating a man named Patrick. He suggests they get a kiddie pool, which, as time shifts again, he falls into. Leanne and Patrick help him out and Teddy is shocked to see Leanne is no longer wearing his ring. She shamefully admits that she lost it at the beach, and couldn't find it even after hours of searching. Teddy takes the dog on a walk to the beach, where another year passes. He finds a chocolate bar containing peanuts in the sand and considers suicide. His daughter, Tallulah, whom he doesn't remember seeing since infancy and is now seven, tries to cheer him up.

Another year passes. Teddy tries to call Sam but is heartbroken when he realizes that he has died. He visits Sam's grave, where he again encounters the strange woman who gave him the "gift" of fast-forwarding through his life. She explains that she was given a similar gift shortly before her own wedding; her experience made her realize that she didn't love her fiancé, and was in fact a lesbian. She often visits her lover's grave to show her how she's using the years she never got to give other people the same gift.

On their tenth anniversary, Teddy rushes to Leanne's house and asks her to find the old tin can. Upon opening it, Leanne miraculously finds Teddy's father's ring. Teddy and Leanne finally reunite, and Teddy wakes up the day after the wedding. Now with a new outlook on life, Teddy calls his boss to inform her he will be cutting down his hours at work and studying photography, encourages Sam to get screened for skin cancer, and resolves to give the tin can to Becka so she can save her own marriage.

== Cast ==
- Rafe Spall as Teddy
- Zahra Newman as Leanne
- Ronny Chieng as Sam
- Dena Kaplan as Becka
- Noni Hazlehurst as The Stranger
- Josh Lawson as Patrick
- Cheyenne Gunn as Talulah
  - Amelia Scurrah as Young Talulah
  - Genevieve Vasdeva as Younger Talulah
- Jordan Lawson as Epipen Guy

== Production ==
Produced by See Pictures, with financial backing by StudioCanal, Screen Australia, Create NSW and Spectrum Films,

== Release ==
The film was released in Australia on 11 February 2021 by StudioCanal, and in US theaters and on VOD on 2 July 2021 by Saban Films.

== Reception ==
=== Box office ===
Long Story Short grossed a worldwide total of $2.3 million.

=== Critical response ===
On review aggregator Rotten Tomatoes, it holds an approval rating of 50% based on 28 reviews, with an average rating of 6/10. The website's critics consensus reads: "Long Story Short's handful of clever touches aren't enough to outweigh this romantic comedy's repetitive and predictable story."

== Adaptation ==
The Italian film Era ora (Still Time, 2023), directed by Alessandro Aronadio and starring Edoardo Leo, is based on Long Story Short.
