= Around the Block (film) =

- Theatrical film poster
- Directed by: Sarah Spillane
- Written by: Sarah Spillane
- Produced by: Su Armstrong; Brian Rosen
- Starring: Christina Ricci; Hunter Page-Lochard; Jack Thompson; Andrea Demetriades; Damian Walshe-Howling; Ruby Rose
- Cinematography: Martin McGrath
- Edited by: Veronika Jenet
- Music by: Nick Wales
- Production company: Kick Pictures
- Distributed by: Arclight Films
- Release date: August 2013 (Australia)
- Running time: 96 minutes
- Country: Australia
- Language: English

Around the Block is a 2013 Australian drama film directed and written by Sarah Spillane. The films stars Christina Ricci, Hunter Page-Lochard, Jack Thompson,Andrea Demetriades,Damian Walshe-Howling and Ruby Rose in her feature film debut in a small supporting role. The film revolves around an American drama teacher (Ricci) who develops a friendship with a sixteen-year-old Aboriginal Australian boy (Page-Lochard) during the 2004 Redfern riots.

== Plot summary ==
An American drama teacher named Dino Chalmers, who has a passion for Shakespeare, gets the opportunity to work at a school in Sydney, Australia, where she attempts to introduce theatre as an alternative to life on the tough streets of Redfern in Sydney. She meets a 16-year-old Aboriginal student named Liam, who lives around the block in Redfern and lives a life of drugs and violence. Chalmers presents Liam with a possibility of a life without drugs and violence by giving him the lead in the production of Hamlet, and so he must choose between pursuing his newfound dream of acting or following his family into a cycle of crime. In addition to this, Dino is in an unhappy relationship with her boyfriend and occasionally finds herself parked outside a shop to watch a woman. It is later revealed the woman is actually a former lover of Dino and the relationship fell apart as Dino was unable to come to terms with herself. Dino later breaks up with her boyfriend after having a sexual encounter with a woman called Hannah and realises she doesn't want to be with him. She later attempts to reconcile with her former lover but is rebuffed as she has since moved on. Liam is wanted for questioning by the police after his brother murdered a man, the police allow Liam to finish the play before taking him away.

== Cast ==
- Christina Ricci as Dino Chalmers
- Hunter Page-Lochard as Liam Wood
- Jack Thompson as Mr O'Donnell
- Damian Walshe-Howling as Mr Graham
- Matt Nable as Jack Wood
- Andrea Demetriades as Kate
- Josh Quong Tart as Barry Griffen
- Daniel Henshall as Simon
- Ruby Rose as Hannah
- Madeleine Madden as Williemai
- Mark Coles Smith as Steve Wood
- Ursula Yovich as Chrissie
- Lillian Crombie as Aunty Rose

== Production ==
Filming began in June 2012 in Redfern and elsewhere in Sydney. Christina Ricci was in Australia for the four-week shoot.

== Reception ==
The film received mixed reviews from critics and audiences, earning a Rotten Tomatoes approval rating of 67%.

== Soundtrack ==
The soundtrack was released on 11 July 2014 by Silent Recordings. The album featured the songs from the film and a number of tracks from the film's original score composed by Nick Wales.

=== Track listing ===
1. "Just to Feel Wanted" by Tuka (4:06)
2. "Block After Block" by Matt and Kim (2:57)
3. "Truth Be Told" by Horrorshow (4:19)
4. "Paint the Town Red" by Thundamentals (4:08)
5. "Exile" by Spit Syndicate (2:53)
6. "She Wants to Know" by Half Moon Run (4:11)
7. "Broken Wings" by Ngaiire (3:08)
8. "Where You At?" by Astronomy Class (3:36)
9. "Catch Me On the Fly" by Nick Wales (5:01)
10. "Cliff Top – Nick Wales (3:51)
11. "Need It" by Half Moon Run (3:27)
12. "How Far How High" by Coda (4:26)
13. "It's Real" by Nick Wales (2:19)
14. "Blackbird Strings" by Nick Wales (0:37)
15. "Steve's Kill Montage" by Nick Wales (4:50)
16. "Rhythm and Flow" by Jenny Morris and various artists (5:36)
