= Sweet Milk Lake =

2026 Australian film

- Directed by: Harvey Zielinski
- Written by: Harvey Zielinski
- Produced by: Philippa Campey; Molly O'Connor
- Starring: Harvey Zielinski; Kieran Darcy-Smith; Hunter Page-Lochard
- Cinematography: Michael Lincoln
- Edited by: Maria Papoutsis
- Music by: Chiara Costanza
- Release date: August 31, 2026 (Melbourne International Film Festival)
- Running time: 94 minutes
- Country: Australia
- Language: English

Sweet Milk Lake is a 2026 Australian coming-of-age drama film written and directed by Harvey Zielinski, who also plays the lead role as a transgender man returning to his home town. The cast includes Kieran Darcy-Smith and Hunter Page-Lochard.

== Synopsis ==
Jake, a transgender man, returns to the small Australian country town in the Victorian Alps where he grew up, called Sweet Milk, to make peace with his estranged and dying father. His father mistakes him for his twin brother, Sam.

== Cast ==
- Harvey Zielinski as twins, Jake and Sam
- Hunter Page-Lochard as Toby
- Kieran Darcy-Smith as Lee
- Nicholas Cassim as Ken
- Ngaire Pigram as Phoebe
- David Howell as Mark
- Belinda McClory as Olivia

== Production ==
Harvey Zielinksi, who is transmasculine, wrote, directed, and starred in the film, which is his directorial debut feature film. Philippa Campey and Molly O'Connor produced the film for Film Camp, and Maria Papoutsis was film editor.

The film was developed under through VicScreen's Originate Features initiative, with production investment from Screen Australia and supported by SBS.

Cinematography was by Michael Lincoln, Chiara Costanza composed the score, and Wei Guo was responsible for production design. Deanne Weir, Michele Turnure-Salleo, Rosie Lourde, Robert Connolly, and Liz Kearney were the executive producers.

Most filming took place in regional Victoria.

The film has been variously described as a coming-of-age film and a "a darkly comic thriller".

== Release ==
Sweet Milk Lake was selected for screening in the Bright Horizons competition in the 2026 Melbourne International Film Festival, where it had its world premiere on 31 August 2026. It also screened as part of the 13th Queer Screen Film Fest at Event Cinemas in Sydney on 8 September 2026.

Sweet Milk Lake was screened as a "BFI Flare Special Presentation" in the London Film Festival on 17 September. It also screened in the Panorama section at the 2026 Vancouver International Film Festival on 4 October 2026, and in the Adelaide Film Festival on 18 October.

The film is due to be released in Australian cinemas later in 2026. CinemaPlus is responsible for Australian sales, while North South East West is handling international sales.

== Reception ==
Luke Buckmaster of The Guardian gave the film 4 out of 5 stars, writing "Harvey Zielinski is superb as director, writer and star of his feature debut", and calling the film "rich and nuanced". Stephen A. Russell, writing for ScreenHub Australia, called the film a "tender but tough debut directorial feature", and also awarded 4 out of 5 stars. Andy Hazel, of The Curb film website, wrote that the film "looks like a far more expensive one", and praises the direction for trusting the audience to make up their own mind about the morality or meaning of Jake's actions in not owning up to his identity.

== Awards and nominations ==
In January 2026, Sweet Milk Lake was nominated for an AWGIE in the 58th AWGIE Awards in the "Feature Film – Original" category. The award was won by Natalie Erika James' horror film Saccharine.

In September 2026, Sweet Milk Lake won the 2026 CinefestOZ Film Prize, the richest Australian film prize, at A$100,000. Upon announcing their choice, the jury said "Sweet Milk Lake is a film that is assured, technically impressive, and delivers a unique and transformative perspective to Australian cinema. A film bolstered by its courage and nuance, and in the end, offers a true sense of hope".
