= Chiara Costanza =

- Also known as: Chiara Kickdrum, CKD
- Born: Turin, Italy
- Genre: Electronic
- Occupations: DJ, composer, musician
- Labels: Finn Audio, Temporal Cast, Revolver Upstairs Records
- Website: chiaracostanza.com

Chiara Costanza, also known as Chiara Kickdrum (CKD), is a music composer, producer, and DJ, born in Italy and now based in Australia. She is known for her television and film scores.

== Early life and education ==
Chiara Costanza was born in Turin, Italy, where she trained as a classical pianist and played in punk bands.

== Career ==
In 2004 Costanza moved to Melbourne, Australia, where she became exposed to electronic music.

After starting DJing in 2013, Constanza was invited to perform at Meredith Music Festival in 2016 under her alias Chiara Kickdrum (CKD)

In 2018, she performed a live soundtrack to Carl Theodor Dreyer's 1932 silent film Vampyr for the National Film and Sound Archive, and has continued composing live soundtracks, such as to Sergio Leone's 1964 film A Fistful of Dollars in 2020 and 2021, and Vampyr again at in 2022.

Costanza composed the soundtrack for the short film All These Creatures, which was awarded the Short Film Palme d'Or at the 2018 Cannes Film Festival. This was followed by soundtracks for the 2021 film Long Story Short, and the TV series Heartbreak High, The Other Guy, The Unusual Suspects, and Preppers.

She created a soundscape for the 2023 ACMI exhibition Goddess: Power Glamour Rebellion.

Costanza composed the score for the 2025 dark comedy thriller Penny Lane Is Dead, and for Harvey Zielinski's 2026 directorial debut feature drama, Sweet Milk Lake.

At the APRA Music Awards of 2026, her music in Filthy was nominated for Best Music for a Short Film.
