= Harry Miller (footballer) =

Australian rules footballer

Personal information
- Full name: Harry Douglas Miller
- Born: 11 June 1985 (age 41); Port Lincoln
- Original team: Port Adelaide Magpies
- Debut: Round 1, 27 March 2005, Hawthorn vs. Sydney Swans, at Sydney Cricket Ground
- Height: 174 cm (5 ft 9 in)
- Weight: 77 kg (170 lb)

Playing career^{1}
Years	Club	Games (Goals)
2005—2006	Hawthorn	18 (13)
- ^{1} Playing statistics correct to the end of 2006.

Harry Douglas Miller (born 11 June 1985) in Port Lincoln, South Australia was an Australian rules footballer who played in the Australian Football League.

Selected at pick 25 in the 2003 AFL draft, Miller was a small forward who played 14 games with Hawthorn in the 2005 season, and another four in 2006. He kicked four goals in the narrow loss to Richmond near the end of the 2005 season and earlier that year had his statistically most productive match with 19 disposals in Hawthorn's comprehensive win over Brisbane.

Miller was delisted at the end of the 2006 season and returned to the South Australian Football League to play with the Port Adelaide Magpies.

He is the cousin of the Burgoyne brothers Peter and Shaun, and also Daniel Wells.
