= Eddie Betts =

Australian rules footballer (born 1986)

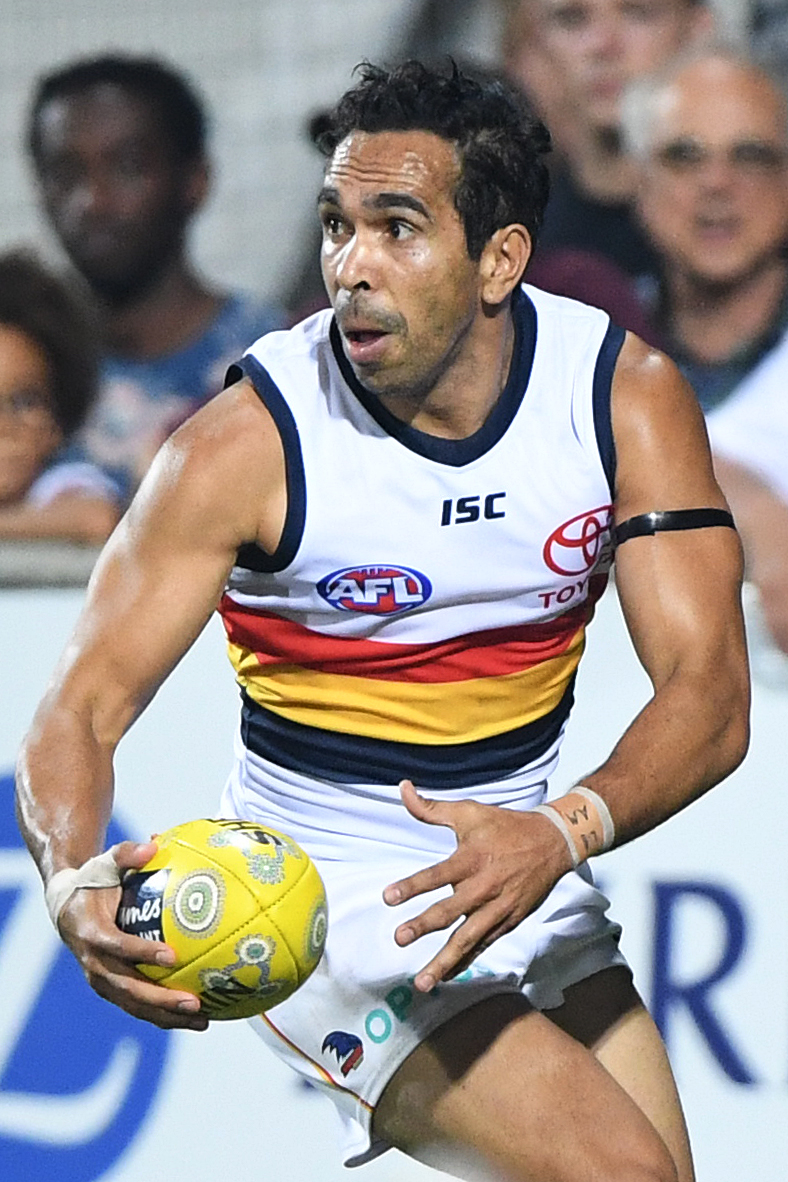
- Betts playing with Adelaide in June 2019

Personal information
- Full name: Edward Robert Betts III
- Born: 26 November 1986 (age 39); Port Lincoln, South Australia, Australia
- Original teams: Calder Cannons (TAC Cup); Templestowe (EFL); Mallee Park Peckers; Mines Rovers
- Draft: No. 3, 2004 pre-season draft
- Debut: Round 1, 2005, Carlton vs. Kangaroos, at Telstra Dome
- Height: 174 cm (5 ft 9 in)
- Weight: 78 kg (172 lb)
- Position: Small Forward

Playing career^{1}
Years	Club	Games (Goals)
2005–2013	Carlton	184 (290)
2014–2019	Adelaide	132 (310)
2020–2021	Carlton	34 (40)
Total		350 (640)

Representative team honours^{2}
Years	Team	Games (Goals)
2007–2013	Indigenous All-Stars	2 (2)
2020	All Stars	1 (0)

International team honours^{2}
2010–2017	Australia	7 (2)
- ^{1} Playing statistics correct to the end of 2021.^{2} Representative statistics correct as of 2020.

Career highlights
- 3× All-Australian: (2015, 2016, 2017); 4× Adelaide leading Goalkicker: (2014, 2015, 2016, 2017); 2× Carlton leading Goalkicker: (2010, 2012); 4× AFL Goal of the Year: (2006, 2015, 2016, 2019); Carlton Best First-Year player: (2005)

Edward Robert Betts III (born 26 November 1986) is an expert AFL commentator and boundary presenter for Fox Footy. He was an Australian rules footballer who played for the Carlton Blues and Adelaide Crows in the Australian Football League between 2005 and 2021. A three-time All-Australian (2015–17), four-time AFL Goal of the Year winner and six-time club leading goalkicker, Betts is widely regarded as a generational talent and one of the greatest small forwards in AFL history. He kicked a total of 640 goals across 350 AFL games.

Betts was initially overlooked in the 2004 AFL National Draft, where 4 of the first 5 draft picks were used to select Brett Deledio, Jarryd Roughead, Ryan Griffen and Lance Franklin. Betts was eventually selected by Carlton with pick No. 3 in the 2004 Pre-Season Draft, where he played for nine years before joining Adelaide as a free agent at the end of the 2013 season. He left Adelaide to rejoin Carlton after the 2019 season, concluding his stellar career at the end of the 2021 season. By the time of his retirement in 2021, Betts held the record for the most goal assists in the AFL, with a total of 318.

After retiring, Betts worked as a part-time development coach for the Geelong Cats, before stepping down in November 2022 to focus on the eponymous Eddie Betts Foundation; a not-for-profit organisation providing mentorship, development pathways and mental health support for young Indigenous Australians to succeed in professional sports.

== Early life, education, and junior football ==
Edward Robert Betts III was born on born 26 November 1986 in Port Lincoln, South Australia, and raised by his mother, Cindy, in Kalgoorlie, Western Australia. He is of Wirangu, Kokatha (both of the far west coast of SA) and Guburn people (of the Western Australian Goldfields region), and describes himself as having been a shy child. He grew up surrounded by a large extended family, on both his mother's and father's side, in which everyone was very caring and loving.

He played junior football for the Mines Rovers Football Club, before moving back to Port Lincoln, where his father lived, to play for the Mallee Park Peckers. During this time, he found that he was the only Aboriginal child in the class, and the only one who could not read and write, and received no help from the school. His off-field behaviour became a problem, including smoking, drinking, drugs, and truancy. As a result, his mother arranged for the 15-year-old Betts to move to Melbourne and begin a TAFE program run by Indigenous former footballer Phil Krakouer.

Moving to Melbourne, a large city where he was separated from extended family and community, was a huge cultural shock for the teenage Betts, and he credits the move by his mother Cindy and Aunt Tessa to Melbourne to support him as crucial to his later success. He later wrote about his lack of literacy skills at this time, and how he struggled with understanding what was written on the boards about football. It was only during his second year at Carlton FC that he realised that he needed a better education and enrolled in literacy and numeracy classes.

In Melbourne, Betts played football for Templestowe, where he won the EFL Division 3 league best and fairest in 2002, and TAC Cup football for the Calder Cannons. He represented Vic Metro as a 16-year-old in the 2003 AFL Under 18 Championships and was selected in the Under 18 All-Australian team that season. He was too young to be selected in the AFL draft at the end of 2003, and he played another season with the Cannons, but was hindered by osteitis pubis. He was overlooked in the 2004 National Draft as a result.

== Professional football career ==
=== Carlton: 2005–2013 ===
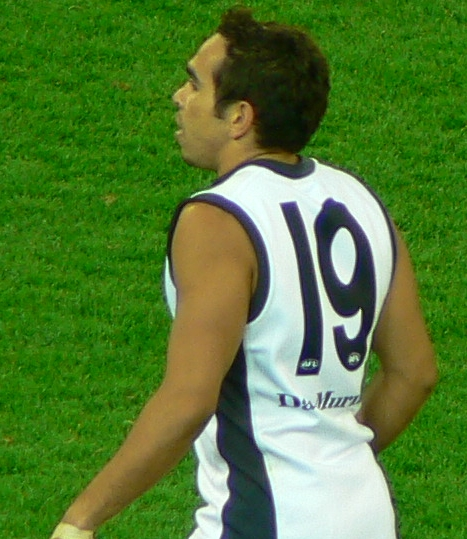
Betts playing for Carlton in 2007

After being overlooked in the National Draft, Betts was recruited to the AFL with pick 3 in the 2004 Pre-Season Draft by the Carlton Football Club. He attracted attention as a lively small forward during the 2005 pre-season, and made his AFL debut in round 1 against the Kangaroos. He kicked 19 goals in 19 games in 2006, playing as a permanent small forward and becoming a fan favourite. The next year, Betts won the Goal of the Year for his goal in round 21 against Collingwood, a banana kick from the boundary under pressure.

Throughout his first four seasons, Betts had a consistent output of roughly a goal per game. From 2009, Betts' goalkicking output increased, kicking 38 goals in 2009, then 42 in 2010 to top Carlton's goal kicking for the first time, while also making the top 10 in the club best and fairest. Betts started slowly in 2011, being on the cusp of being dropped early in the season, but rebounded to kick 50 goals for the season, including a career-best eight goals against Essendon in round 18.

Betts kicked 48 goals in 2012, stepping up in the absence of several of the Blues' key forwards to become their major forward target. In that year he led the club's goalkicking, was runner-up in the club best and fairest count and was named in the 40 man All-Australian shortlist for the second year in a row.

Betts kicked 27 goals in 18 games in a 2013 season interrupted by a suspension and a fractured jaw, including five goals in Carlton's two finals. At the end of the season, Betts entered the market as a restricted free agent, and in October he notified Carlton he had accepted a four-year contract understood to be worth about $2 million (AUS) to join the Adelaide Crows. Carlton had 72 hours to match the Crows offer but declined to do so, allowing the confirmation of Betts' switch to occur on 4 October, the first day of the free agency period.

=== Adelaide: 2014–2019 ===
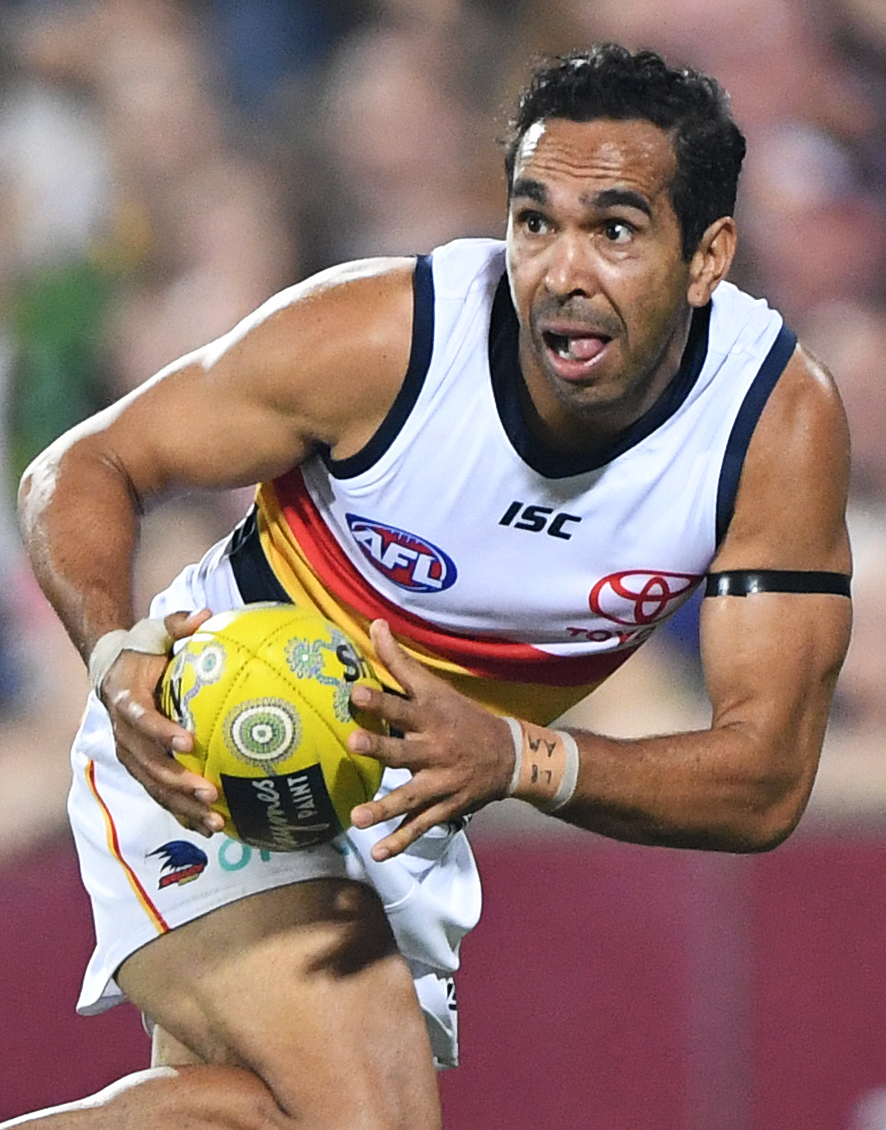
Eddie Betts in June 2019

In his first season at Adelaide, Betts played all 22 games and kicked a career-best 51 goals, leading Adelaide's goalkicking table and finishing eighth in the Coleman Medal. He also had more goal assists than anyone else in the AFL and was ranked third in the league for tackles inside the forward 50. Betts played his 200th AFL game against Hawthorn at Adelaide Oval in round 17.

On 26 May 2015, the AFL launched an inquiry into Betts' signing with Adelaide after the outgoing Carlton coach, Mick Malthouse, claimed to have been told by the current Carlton and former Adelaide CEO Steven Trigg that Adelaide had illegally signed Betts 18 months prior to him departing Carlton. Adelaide categorically denied the claim, as did Carlton and Betts' manager. Betts and all other parties were subsequently cleared of any wrongdoing in the affair. Following on from this controversy, Betts improved on his stellar 2014 season by kicking 63 goals in 2015, finishing third in the Coleman Medal, and finally achieving All-Australian honours. Betts also was awarded the Goal of the Year in 2015 for the second time in his career; against Fremantle in wet conditions, he managed to control the ball near the boundary at half-forward and kicked a left-foot torpedo punt from 50 metres out on the boundary line, which dribbled through for a goal.

In a Showdown in round 3, 2017, Betts was racially abused by a Port Adelaide club member. The offender was evicted from the ground and had his membership suspended indefinitely. In the Crows' next match, Betts was given the honour of tossing the coin before the match along with Essendon player Anthony McDonald-Tipungwuti before kicking 6 goals, taking the lead in the Coleman Medal in the Crows' 65-point win. This included 5 first-half goals, and he and McDonald-Tipungwuti kicked 10 goals between them for the match. In round 7, he kicked his 500th career goal against North Melbourne in the second quarter, before being flattened by defender Scott Thompson and immediately getting a set shot to kick his second goal in a row. Overall he got three goals for the match in spite of the Crows losing by 59 points. Betts had another good performance in 2017's Sir Douglas Nicholls Indigenous Round, kicking three goals in the Crows' 100-point win over Fremantle. In August 2017, Betts was admitted to hospital with appendicitis and missed Adelaide's round 19 draw against Collingwood but returned the following week for the Showdown and kicked 4 goals, pushing up to second place on the overall Showdown leading goal-kickers list, only behind captain Taylor Walker. Betts was a part of Adelaide's losing Grand Final team that year, kicking one goal in the match.

In 2018, Betts kicked only 29 goals for the year, making it his worst return in 5 years at the Crows. Also in 2018, Betts missed four matches due to hamstring injuries, having missed only one match in his previous four seasons at Adelaide.

On Round 5 of the 2019 season, he played in his 300th AFL game, against the Gold Coast Suns. In front of a roaring crowd and with 6 minutes left in what turned out to be an easy win, he scored a classic left-footed banana that won him an unparalleled 4th AFL Goal of the Year award.

=== Return to Carlton: 2020–2021 ===
At the conclusion of the 2019 season, Betts was traded back to Carlton.

On 19 November 2019, Betts was given his previous jumper number at Carlton, no. 19, once again.

On 16 August 2021, Betts announced via Instagram he would be playing his 350th and final AFL match against Greater Western Sydney on 21 August 2021. Betts was chaired off the ground following the match.

== Coaching career ==
After his retirement, Betts began his job as a developmental coach at Geelong in October 2021, also bringing in former Adelaide teammate and delisted player Tyson Stengle and turned him into a member of the 2022 All-Australian roster. He resigned from the role in November 2022.

== Other activities ==
=== Teaching ===
While playing for Carlton, Betts worked as a teacher's aide at Assumption College in Kilmore, Victoria. During this time he also studied sport recreation, intending to become a primary school teacher.

==== Eddie Betts Foundation ====
After leaving his coaching role at the Cats in November 2022, Betts turned his attention to his foundation, the Eddie Betts Foundation, which supports young Indigenous Australians in sport. The foundation, a registered charity, runs a football academy and basketball program, as well as education, community, and mentoring programs.

=== Publications ===
==== Children's books & TV series ====
When Betts entered the AFL at 17 years of age, he had the reading and writing ability of a six- to seven-year-old. To address the challenges and disadvantage this can cause young people, he created a series of educational books for children. His Lil' Homies book series aim to help kids read with confidence and enjoyment and give them the chance to express their own personality into the story.

His first book, My Kind: Rap Yourself and Others in Kindness with Eddie and the Lil' Homies (2018), is about spreading kindness and helping kids understand acceptance and equality.

My People (2019), Betts' second book for children, is about sharing and educating kids on Aboriginal culture and Australia's First Nations peoples. Betts is often asked to visit schools to share his knowledge and experience.

The Lil' Homies series has been adapted for television, with a ten-part series released on NITV and Netflix (the first co-commission between the two) in early 2024. The series stars Hunter Page-Lochard as Eddie, Miah Madden as Lottie, Andrew Dang as Tal, and Billy Betts (Eddie Betts' eight-year-old son) as Junior.

==== Others ====
Betts' memoir, The Boy from Boomerang Crescent, was published in August 2022. Part of Betts' motivation for writing it was to help educate non-Indigenous Australians "how we live as Aboriginal people, within the communities. What we face in our life," and the challenges faced by Aboriginal children.

It won the Social Impact Book of the Year at the 2023 Australian Book Industry Awards.

== Recognition, impact, and in arts and media ==
In 2014, Betts' first year at Adelaide, he converted a series of difficult shots at goal from the right forward pocket at the northern end of Adelaide Oval. Then-coach Brenton Sanderson dubbed that area of the ground "Eddie's Pocket", and the name has caught on with fans and commentators. Betts' 2015, 2016, and 2019 goal-of-the-year-winning goals were from the opposite pocket, the left forward pocket at the same end.

Betts features in the 2021 fly-on-the-wall documentary TV series Making Their Mark, which showed the impact of the COVID-19 pandemic on several AFL clubs, players, and staff.

In September 2021 Australian musician Paul Kelly released a song inspired by Betts and his battle with racism, titled Every Step of the Way.

== Personal life ==
Betts married his long-term partner, Anna Scullie, in a surprise wedding in August 2015, after several years' engagement. They have five children, three boys and twin daughters.

Betts has a lot of pride in his Aboriginal heritage and culture. He cites his favourite moment was the goal that he kicked in the Sir Doug Nicholls Indigenous Round while wearing a jersey designed by his Aunt Susie Betts, which became his third Goal of the Year.

Betts has faced racism in his life and during his football career, and has become "a prominent voice against racism in Australia". In 2016, a spectator threw a banana at him as he was playing for the Crows against Port Adelaide, as a form of racial abuse, (Note: A banana has long been used as a form of racial abuse in sport, originating in Europe and England in the 1980s. It is intended to imply that the target is a monkey.) and the incident still haunts him, and taints his enjoyment of the fruit. After watching the 2019 film The Australian Dream about the abuse suffered by fellow AFL footballer Adam Goodes when he played for the Sydney Swans, he and many other Indigenous became aware of the extent of the problem for the first time. He felt a responsibility as a leader for taking a stand, and to continue to call out racism whenever it occurred.

In 2022 he and his children were asked by a lifeguard to leave a public swimming pool, because "an elderly white couple had said I was making their little grandchild uncomfortable".

On the evening of 28 March 2024, a group of people drove past the Betts family home and racially abused his children, who were playing basketball in the front yard. Betts posted video of the incident from his security camera on Instagram, writing "Aboriginal kids deserve to be able to play safely, free from racism and abuse over the fence. We are not even safe in our own homes. If you know who this is please let them know that I'm open to having a chat about how much this hurts our kids." Victoria Police were called to investigate the incident, and Tanya Hosch and Andrew Dillon put out a statement on behalf of the AFL offering support to the Betts family.

== Football honours and achievements ==
=== Team ===
- NAB Cup (Carlton) 2007
- McClelland Trophy (Adelaide) 2017

=== Individual ===
- 3× All-Australian: (2015, 2016, 2017)
- 4× Adelaide leading Goalkicker: (2014, 2015, 2016, 2017)
- 2× Carlton leading Goalkicker: (2010, 2012)
- 4× AFL Goal of the Year: (2006, 2015, 2016, 2019)
- Carlton Best First-Year player: (2005)

== Statistics ==
Statistics are calculated to end of the 2021 season

Legend
G	Goals	K	Kicks	D	Disposals	T	Tackles
B	Behinds	H	Handballs	M	Marks

Season	Team	No.	Games	Totals							Averages (per game)							Votes
Season	Team	No.	Games	G	B	K	H	D	M	T	G	B	K	H	D	M	T	Votes
2005	Carlton	19	19	19	12	86	36	122	17	42	1.0	0.6	4.5	1.9	6.4	0.9	2.2	0
2006	Carlton	19	21	20	10	128	100	228	58	70	1.0	0.5	6.1	4.8	10.9	2.8	3.3	0
2007	Carlton	19	17	21	11	108	94	202	44	66	1.2	0.7	6.4	5.5	11.9	2.6	3.6	0
2008	Carlton	19	18	25	10	143	90	233	62	33	1.4	0.6	7.9	5.0	12.9	3.4	1.8	0
2009	Carlton	19	22	38	21	156	109	265	55	78	1.7	1.0	7.1	5.0	12.1	2.5	3.6	2
2010	Carlton	19	23	42	29	178	140	318	91	76	1.8	1.3	7.7	6.1	13.8	4.0	3.3	3
2011	Carlton	19	24	50	22	176	121	297	90	84	2.1	0.9	7.3	5.0	12.4	3.8	3.5	4
2012	Carlton	19	22	48	30	182	103	285	72	62	2.2	1.4	8.3	4.7	13.0	3.3	2.8	1
2013	Carlton	19	18	27	15	125	85	210	49	61	1.5	0.8	6.9	4.7	11.7	2.7	3.4	0
2014	Adelaide	18	22	51	22	167	123	290	53	74	2.3	1.0	7.6	5.6	13.2	2.4	3.4	4
2015	Adelaide	18	23	63	25	213	99	312	84	65	2.7	1.1	9.3	4.3	13.6	3.7	2.8	7
2016	Adelaide	18	24	75	31	231	89	320	79	85	3.1	1.3	9.6	3.7	13.3	3.3	3.5	10
2017	Adelaide	18	24	55	34	210	108	318	78	80	2.3	1.4	8.8	4.5	13.3	3.3	3.3	5
2018	Adelaide	18	18	29	20	143	96	239	43	50	1.6	1.1	7.9	5.3	13.3	2.4	2.8	1
2019	Adelaide	18	21	37	21	155	96	251	49	52	1.8	1.0	7.4	4.6	12.0	2.3	2.5	5
2020	Carlton	19	15	13	13	89	44	133	24	41	0.8	0.8	5.9	2.9	8.8	1.6	2.7	3
2021	Carlton	19	19	27	16	121	59	180	42	31	1.4	0.8	6.4	3.1	9.5	2.2	1.6	0
Career			350	640	342	2611	1592	4203	990	1050	1.8	1.0	7.5	4.6	12.0	2.8	3.0	45
