= Harvey Zielinski =

Australian actor

- Born: 1990 or 1991 (age 35–36); Western Australia
- Occupations: Actor, director, screenwriter
- Website: harveyzielinski.com

Harvey Zielinski (born 1990 or 1991) is an Australian actor, director, writer, and acting teacher. His 2026 debut feature film as a director, Sweet Milk Lake, was nominated for multiple awards.

== Early life and education ==
Harvey Zielinski was born in 1990 or 1991 in Western Australia, one of six children. He began acting when he was eight years old.

Zielinski attended The National Drama School (formerly National Theatre Drama School) in St Kilda, Victoria, graduating in 2017.

== Career ==
Zielinski's stage credits include acting roles in Who's Afraid of Virginia Woolf?, Suddenly Last Summer, and The Antipodes. His screen credits include leads in the ABC series White Fever and the Quibi series Don't Look Deeper, and a regular role on the Amazon Prime Video series Deadloch.

Zielinski wrote, directed, produced, and starred in the 2026 film Sweet Milk Lake, in which he plays the dual role of a trans man and his twin brother. This is his debut directorial feature film, and has been nominated for multiple awards. Luke Buckmaster of The Guardian gave the film 4 out of 5 stars, writing "Harvey Zielinski is superb as director, writer and star of his feature debut", and calling the film "rich and nuanced". Hunter Page-Lochard plays Toby, a local gay man, in the film.

== Other activities ==
Zielinski teaches acting at The National Theatre Drama School, The Australian Film & Television Academy (TAFTA), and Brave Studios.

In 2024, Zielinski co-designed "The Unsaid Says A Lot", a campaign to raise awareness of transgender and gender-diverse people in Victoria.

== Awards and recognition ==
In 2018, Zielinski received a Rising Star Award from the Casting Guild of Australia.

Zielinski is a two-time finalist and the first transgender finalist for the Heath Ledger Scholarship.

For the Australian Writers' Guild, Zielinski was nominated in the 57th AWGIE Awards "Comedy - Situation or Narrative" category for an episode of White Fever, and the 58th AWGIE Awards "Feature Film - Original" category for Sweet Milk Lake.

For directing Sweet Milk Lake, Zielinski was nominated for the Bright Horizons Award in the 2026 Melbourne International Film Festival (MIFF) Awards.

In September 2026, Sweet Milk Lake won the 2026 CinefestOZ Film Prize, the richest Australian film prize, at A$100,000. Upon announcing their choice, the jury said "Sweet Milk Lake is a film that is assured, technically impressive, and delivers a unique and transformative perspective to Australian cinema. A film bolstered by its courage and nuance, and in the end, offers a true sense of hope".

== Personal life ==
Zielinski is a queer trans man. He transitioned to male at the age of 24.
