= Hunter Page-Lochard =

Australian actor (born 1993)

- Born: Hunter Djali Yumunu Page-Lochard; Sydney, New South Wales, Australia
- Citizenship: Australia; United States
- Occupation: Actor

Hunter Djali Yumunu Page-Lochard is an Australian stage and screen actor of both Aboriginal Australian and African-American descent. He is known for his roles in the films The Sapphires (2012), Around the Block (2013), the 2016 TV series Cleverman, and the 2026 series Reckless.

== Early life and education ==
Hunter Djali Yumunu Page-Lochard is the son of choreographer Stephen Page, who is from Brisbane, and Cynthia Lochard, from Manhattan, New York City. Page-Lochard was born in Sydney. His mother, who is of African-American descent, was a dancer for the New York City Ballet and is now a teacher for the Pilates Method. His father, who is descended from the Nunukul people and the Munaldjali of the Yugambeh people from southeast Queensland, was a dancer turned choreographer and became the artistic director for Bangarra Dance Theatre. Page-Lochard credits his father, along with 11 uncles and aunts, with giving him much of his education, including at Bangarra.

He attended St Mary's Cathedral College, Sydney.

In 2012, Page-Lochard graduated from Australian Film, Television and Radio School with a Graduate Certificate in Story Development and Screenwriting Fundamentals, and completed an Actors Residency course at the National Institute of Dramatic Art.

== Career ==
=== Stage ===
Page-Lochard first appeared on stage at six months old, held by his dad when he was dancing. He later appeared in Skin (2000); Boomerang (2005); Bloodland (2012, for the Sydney Theatre Company and Adelaide Festival by Bangarra Dance Theatre); and Blak (2013).

He featured in Wesley Enoch's, Black Diggers (2014) a Queensland Theatre Company production. He then played the lead in Brothers Wreck (2014) by Jada Alberts at Sydney's Belvoir directed by Leah Purcell. He played a role in ATYP's Sugarland (2014). He won the Sydney Theatre Awards' Best Newcomer Award for Black Diggers, Brothers Wreck and Sugarland. He was nominated for a Helpmann Award in 2015 for Brothers Wreck. In 2015, he starred as Orestes in Belvoir's Elektra/Orestes.

=== Film and TV ===
As a child, Page-Lochard appeared in short films, including Adrian Russell Wills' Arcadia (2002) and Wayne Blair's The Djarn Djarns (2005), which won the Crystal Bear Award for Best Short Film at the Berlin International Film Festival.

He appeared in guest roles on Water Rats (2001), East West 101 (2007), directed by Peter Andrikidis and ABC2's Soul Mates (2014).

He made his feature film debut in Rachel Perkins' award-winning film, Bran Nue Dae (2010). He appeared in Wayne Blair's The Sapphires, which screened in Official Selection at the Cannes Film Festival. He also featured as the lead in Sarah Spillane's feature film, Around the Block (2013) alongside Christina Ricci. In 2015, he attended the Toronto International Film Festival for his father's feature film debut Spear (2015), in which he played the lead role as Djali. Page-Lochard appears as the lead in Wayne Blair and Leah Purcell's Cleverman on ABC Television in 2016.

He directed and co-wrote (with Eryk Lenartowicz) his first short film Djali in 2017. It was selected for screening at the Sydney Film Festival and CinefestOZ in 2018. In 2020, he appeared in and co-directed the children's TV series Thalu, commissioned by National Indigenous Television and ABC Me.

In 2023, Page-Lochard appeared in ABC drama The Newsreader, for which he won an AACTA Award for best supporting actor. He plays a drug dealer in the police drama Critical Incident, released on 12 August 2024 on Stan.

Page-Lochard played a lead role in the 2026 SBS / NITV co-commissioned TV series Reckless. Also in 2026, he plays Toby, a gay love interest for the lead character, played by Harvey Zielinski, in Zielinski's directorial debut feature film Sweet Milk Lake.

On 23 February 2026, Page-Lochard was announced as lead for ABC series Fortitude Valley alongside Kat Stewart.

=== Advertising ===
Page-Lochard stars in a 2022 Hyundai television ad, called "Have you tried it?", which was filmed in the Flinders Ranges of South Australia.

== Personal life ==
It was reported in 2013 that Page-Lochard holds dual Australian and US citizenship, due to the Haitian-American heritage of his mother.

== Filmography ==
=== Television appearances ===
Year	Ti	Role	Notes
2001	Water Rats	Max Bullen	2 episodes
2003	Black Talk	N/A	
2007	East West 101	Kari King	Episode: "Death at the Station"
2012	Woollo	Tradesmen	Television film
2014	Soul Mates	Tyrion	Episode: "Father Time"
2015	Shit Creek	Baby-Face Berkley	TV series
2016–2017	Cleverman	Koen West	12 episodes
2016–2017	Wentworth	Shane Butler	6 episodes
2018–21	Harrow	Callan Prowd	28 episodes
2018	Tidelands	Jared	4 episodes
2019	Les Norton	Billy Dunne	10 episodes
2020	Thalu	The Trapper	1 episode
2021	Fires	Mott	6 episodes
2021	Eden	Fred	3 episodes
2022	Barons	Reg Thompson	8 episodes
2022	Play School	Self	1 episode
2023, 2025	The Newsreader	Lynus Preston	2 episodes
2024	Critical Incident	Ty Egan	TV series 6 episodes
2025	Reckless	Charlie	TV series: 4 episodes
2027	Fortitude Valley	TBA	TV series

=== Film appearances ===
Year	Title	Role	Notes
2026	Sweet Milk Lake	Toby	
2024	Kid Snow	Lizard	
2024	Lunacy	The Mongoose	
2023	How Can I Help You	Boss	Short
2021	Lustration VR		Short
2021	Streamline	Josh Hill	
2021	Cooked	Daz/Dougie/Water Police	
2015	Spear	Djali	
2014	The Palace That I Live In	Jack	Short film
2013	Around the Block	Liam Wood	
2012	The Sapphires	Stevie Kayne	
2009	Bran Nue Dae	Peter	
2005	The Djarn Djarns	Frankie Dollar	

== Theatre ==
Year	Title	Role	Company
1993	The Cake Man	Baby	Bangarra Dance Theatre
2000	Skin	Dancer	Bangarra Dance Theatre
2005	Boomerang	Dancer	Bangarra Dance Theatre
2012	Bloodland	Runu	Sydney Theatre Company
2013	Blak	Dancer	Bangarra Dance Theatre
2014	Black Diggers	Bertie/Ensemble	Queensland Theatre Company
2014	Brothers Wreck	Ruben	Belvoir St Theatre
2014	Sugarland	Jimmy	ATYP
2015	Elektra/Orestes	Orestes	Belvoir St Theatre
