= Peter Burgoyne =

Australian rules footballer (born 1978)

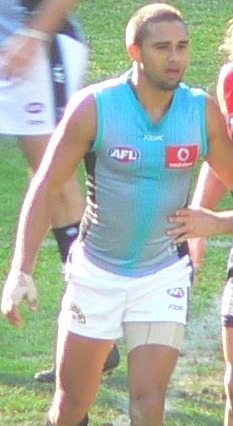

Personal information
- Born: 29 January 1978 (age 48)
- Original team: St Mary's (NTFL)
- Height: 183 cm (6 ft 0 in)
- Weight: 84 kg (185 lb)
- Positions: Midfield, half back

Playing career^{1}
Years	Club	Games (Goals)
1996–1998	Port Adelaide (SANFL)	30 (28)
1997–2009	Port Adelaide	240 (193)
Total		270 (221)

Representative team honours
Years	Team	Games (Goals)
1999	South Australia	1 (0)
2003–2007	Indigenous All-Stars	2 (2)
2008	Dream Team	1 (0)

International team honours
1999–2003	Australia	4 (0)
- ^{1} Playing statistics correct to the end of 2009.

Career highlights
- Club: 2x Port Adelaide premiership player; 1998 (SANFL); 2004 (AFL); Representative: 1x game for South Australia; 4x games for Australia; Honours: Indigenous Team of the Century; Showdown Medal (2003)

Peter Gabriel Burgoyne (born 29 January 1978) is a former Australian rules footballer with Port Adelaide in the Australian Football League (AFL). He played primarily in midfield and on the half-back flank.

== Early life ==
Burgoyne is of Indigenous Australian descent with tribal ancestry that can be traced to the Kokatha (Nunga) in South Australia. He grew up in the Northern Territory and began playing football with St Mary's in the Northern Territory Football League (NTFL). He is the elder brother of former Hawthorn and Port Adelaide player, Shaun Burgoyne and is the son of former Port Adelaide player Peter Burgoyne, Sr.

== AFL career ==
=== Early career ===
Beginning his AFL career with the inaugural Port Adelaide side to enter the AFL, Burgoyne became well-regarded for his performance as an attacking midfielder. He was selected from the Port Adelaide side in the South Australian National Football League (SANFL) in their changeover from the SANFL to the AFL. In the Round 21, 2000 clash against Carlton, Burgoyne won the match for Port Adelaide after the siren.

=== Success ===
Honours include being selected as part of the International rules series in 1999 and was a vital part of Port's premiership side of 2004. Burgoyne was also named in the Indigenous Team of the Century. Despite being selected for and representing South Australia in the final State of Origin game against Victoria in 1999, Burgoyne was not technically eligible under the existing rules, having resided in the Northern Territory and not South Australia for the majority of his life between the ages of 10 and 17.

=== Twilight career ===
In 2007, Burgoyne made a highly successful transition to the half-back flank, following an injury-riddled 2006 in his usual midfield role, and finished third in the club's Best and Fairest count. His finals series was also acknowledged with the Power's 'Best Finals Player' award.

=== Retirement ===
Burgoyne retired at the end of the 2009 season. He and team-mate Brendon Lade, the last remaining members of Port Adelaide's inaugural AFL team, both played their final games in round 22, 2009.

== Playing statistics ==
Legend
G	Goals	K	Kicks	D	Disposals	T	Tackles
B	Behinds	H	Handballs	M	Marks
#	Played in that season's premiership team

Season	Team	No.	Games	Totals							Averages (per game)						
Season	Team	No.	Games	G	B	K	H	D	M	T	G	B	K	H	D	M	T
1997	Port Adelaide	26	15	12	14	92	49	141	21	16	0.8	0.9	6.1	3.3	9.4	1.4	1.1
1998	Port Adelaide	26	10	10	7	85	29	114	20	13	1.0	0.7	8.5	2.9	11.4	2.0	1.3
1999	Port Adelaide	26	20	11	13	267	155	422	66	37	0.6	0.7	13.4	7.8	21.1	3.3	1.9
2000	Port Adelaide	7	21	23	19	265	98	363	80	53	1.1	0.9	12.6	4.7	17.3	3.8	2.5
2001	Port Adelaide	7	22	30	18	247	135	382	98	57	1.4	0.8	11.2	6.1	17.4	4.5	2.6
2002	Port Adelaide	7	24	41	15	263	130	393	96	82	1.7	0.6	11.0	5.4	16.4	4.0	3.4
2003	Port Adelaide	7	20	22	19	301	125	426	91	76	1.1	1.0	15.1	6.3	21.3	4.6	3.8
2004^{#}	Port Adelaide	7	23	12	11	283	201	484	54	75	0.5	0.5	12.3	8.7	21.0	2.3	3.3
2005	Port Adelaide	7	19	11	8	245	144	389	53	50	0.6	0.4	12.9	7.6	20.5	2.8	2.6
2006	Port Adelaide	7	10	5	6	112	90	202	24	20	0.5	0.6	11.2	9.0	20.2	2.4	2.0
2007	Port Adelaide	7	24	8	11	389	222	611	88	70	0.3	0.5	16.2	9.3	25.5	3.7	2.9
2008	Port Adelaide	7	17	4	4	253	175	428	66	40	0.2	0.2	14.9	10.3	25.2	3.9	2.4
2009	Port Adelaide	7	15	4	3	195	161	356	39	43	0.3	0.2	13.0	10.7	23.7	2.6	2.9
Career			240	193	148	2997	1714	4711	796	632	0.8	0.6	12.5	7.1	19.6	3.3	2.6

== See also ==
- After the siren kicks in Australian rules football
