= The Newsreader series 3 =

Series of television show

The Newsreader
- Series 3
- Showrunner: Michael Lucas
- Starring: Anna Torv; Sam Reid; William McInnes
- No. of episodes: 6

Release
- Original network: ABC Television
- Original release: February 2, 2025

Series chronology
- ← Previous; Series 2

The third and final series of The Newsreader premiered on ABC TV on Sunday 2 February 2025 at 8:30pm, airing weekly from that date. On the same day, all episodes were made available on ABC iView.

As with previous series, it was primarily written by Michael Lucas, and directed in its entirety by Emma Freeman. Set through 1989, this series follows Dale as he navigates the increased media attention and focus now he is established as television's 'King of News', and how the pressure that comes with holding such a prestigious position in the industry increasingly risks the lines between his public and private personas becoming blurred - paradoxically more so as he ever-more-desperately attempts to ensure that is mitigated. Helen, meanwhile, endeavours to ensure those blurred lines between her public and private lives become more concretely delineated, and that her proclivities for her mental health struggles to spill into the open are not only eliminated, but resolved at the source, as she aims to ensconce herself at a rival network with her own public affairs show.

== Background ==
The ABC confirmed in their Upfronts presentation in November 2023 that a third series would be released in the latter half of 2024, with the entire ensemble cast returning. In February 2024, TVTonight reported that the ABC had scheduled the series in Q4, suggesting it will broadcast sometime between October and December 2024. In June 2024, it was announced the series would instead be broadcast in 2025. In November 2024, Lucas announced it would premiere on 2 February 2025 on ABC, with all episodes being released on ABC iView on that date.

A press release accompanying the announcement of the series' commission details the upcoming season's plot lines, revealing that Dale is now considered News at Six's "King of News", with Helen's international reporting having been met with "great acclaim", but as a "cynical network move sees the two former lovers pitted in direct competition, their kinship will be tested as never before". Over the course of 1989, Helen and Dale will compete to cover a cascade of historical events… from the Exxon Valdez oil spill, to the Tiananmen Square massacre, the boycotts of South Africa's Apartheid, and the fall of the Berlin Wall." The series opens on 17 March 1989, with characters attending the Logie Awards ceremony held on that date.

In April 2024, Chris Oliver-Taylor, ABC's chief content officer, said that he expects the third series to be the last and conclude the show's run. In June 2024, this was confirmed by the ABC and Lucas, who said that since the first series the show was seen as "this saga as three acts, and the coming series is designed as an emotional and cathartic third act for the whole vivid ensemble [which] will be very clear to audiences when they see it".

In April 2024, as the series moved into post-production, further information about its plotting was revealed, stating that Dale, "fronting the News At Six solo, has become the most beloved name in news, a Gold Logie nominee, [and] permanently number one in the nightly ratings", while "Helen's fearless international reporting has won her an opportunity to be the first woman to both anchor and produce her own current affairs show".

Reid summed up his character's arc for the series as being one in which he has "achieved all of his quote, unquote dreams, and he's grappling with the fact that they're not turning out to be all the things that he thought he wanted [and] he's just trying to work out what he wants and find his place in the world". Additionally, Dale has "a new sense of power, which he's never really had before [and so] he's trying to work out how to operate within this seat of power, [but] all power eventually corrupts people, and Dale, unfortunately, is susceptible to that.” Torv spoke of how her character is also in a similar position, having moved away from News at Six to an environment where she has more editorial control, but nevertheless still finds herself "undermined by male management and not listened to by those she’s working with", and the series charts as her character attempts to discover how "to make this better".

== Cast ==
=== Main ===
- Anna Torv, as Helen Norville
- Sam Reid, as Dale Jennings
- William McInnes, as Lindsay Cunningham
- Marg Downey, as Evelyn Walters
- Stephen Peacocke, as Rob Rickards
- Michelle Lim Davidson, as Noelene Rickards
- Chum Ehelepola, as Dennis Tibb
- Chai Hansen, as Tim Ahern
- Philippa Northeast, as Kay Walters
- Daniel Henshall, as Bill McFarlane

=== Recurring ===
- Jackson Tozer, as Ross McGrath
- Rhys Mitchell, as Brian Mathers
- Andrew McFarlane, as Richard Bertrand
- Gillian Cosgriff, as Irene McFarlane
- Dan Spielman, as Vincent Callahan
- Caroline Lee, as Jean Pascoe
- Maria Angelico, as Cheryl Ricci
- Nick Simpson-Deeks, as Paul Stricker
- Maude Davey, as Val Jennings
- Queenie van de Zandt, as Donna Gillies
- Tom Wilson, as Nick
- Maria Theodorakis, as Leonie Briggs
- Grant Piro, as Wayne
- Robin McLeavy, as Marcia Evans
- Meewon Yang, as Soon-Hee Kim
- Joe Cho, as Byung-Ho Kim
- Somi Han and Ruby Roh, as Baby Hana Rickards
- Yuchen Wang, as Lee Zheng

=== Notable guests ===
- Gillian Cosgriff, as Irene McFarlane
- Harmehar Singh, as Sharon
- Carolyn Bock, as Ann Bertrand
- Hunter Page-Lochard, as Lynus Preston
- Clarence Ryan, as Deano Prince
- Paula Nazarski, as Aunty "Tiny"
- Peta Brady, as Daniela Aranz
- Mark Mitchell, as Brian Mathers' father
- Lewis Mitchell and Callum Mitchell, as Declan and Kieran Mathers
- Catherine Glavcic, as Bev Gibson
- Nick Farnell, as Greg 'Walshy' Walsh
- Edwina Wren, as Cathy O'Hare

== Episodes ==
All episodes were made available on ABC iView prior to linear broadcast; on the morning of 2 February 2025, the series' premiere date.

No. overall	No. in series	Title	Directed by	Written by	News event covered	Original release date	Consolidated viewership
13	1	"Night of Nights"	Emma Freeman	Michael Lucas	Lockerbie disaster 1989 Logies	2 February 2025 (Note: This episode was first seen at an ACMI event in Melbourne on 31 January 2025.)	644,000
21 December 1988; 16-20 March 1989. It's time for television's 'night of nights' - the Logie Awards - and it could not be more significant for Dale, who is up for its most prestigious: the Gold Logie, for most popular television personality. Helen arrives back home after a successful spell reporting overseas, to discover not only is she presenting the Gold Logie - a sign Dale is sure to win - but that directly preceding it will be the promo for her new current affairs show Public Eye... and the network has decided to place it directly against the News at Six. Helen has a crisis of confidence, still holding a duty and responsibility towards Dale; others attempt to convince her that she has well and truly deserved this honour, while Dale struggles to disguise how hollow he feels at his. Noelene is crestfallen that her devotion to the job even through late pregnancy isn't being recognised by now-husband Rob, and a grieving Kay spots an opportunity following an unexpected brush with Dale.
14	2	"A New Era"	Emma Freeman	Michael Lucas	Exxon Valdez oil spill Bob Hawke infidelity rumours	9 February 2025	486,000
27-29 March 1989. The news of a large Alaskan oil spill sparks a downward spiral for Helen, her meticulously planned show's debut upended. A series of setbacks, including Lindsay's attempt at sabotage, causes a public explosion that exacerbates - compounded by the quality of Public Eye's opener - the growing concern about her capability for her major new role, mainly by co-exec producer Bill and newsroom head Vincent whose expected compromises from her inordinately negate her ideas. Noelene - against Rob's advice, with labour imminent - feverishly works from her hospital bed to conjure an interview with Prime Minister Bob Hawke over suggestions of his marital infidelity for News at Six, while Dale kickstarts his efforts to pull the rug out from under Lindsay - fighting him for head of the pride - as he revels in a newfound sense of confidence triggered by media coverage of a potential relationship with Kay entrenching his awarded status as 'TV royalty'.
15	3	"Behind the Front Line"	Emma Freeman	Christine Bartlett	Tiananmen Square massacre	16 February 2025	458,000
26 May-5 June 1989. Helen's dedicated approach to appreciating the work with her therapist is hastily jeopardised when she begins to feel she has been unconsciously led down a path to a diagnosis of borderline personality disorder, which sparks a breakdown larger than ever before, compounded by the news Public Eye has been axed. Noelene becomes caught between her and Dale, as Lindsay's disputing of how soon the incipient climax of the student protests in China will be clashes against how keen Eye is for the story. Dale - befitting his being cast into the limelight - hosts a lavish birthday bash, deliberately excluding Lindsay from the invite list; the event sees their deteriorating relationship burst out into the open, as News at Six is confronted with a lead lost to the opposition, with Helen ebullient at the chances to rescue her career. Kay acknowledges Evelyn's warnings about Dale in a subversive manner, as both approach each other with their eyes open.
16	4	"One Team, All Brothers"	Emma Freeman	Adrian Russell Wills; Michael Lucas	Sporting boycott of South Africa	23 February 2025	393,000
7-10 August 1989. Dale becomes riven with insecurities after learning how much his adoption of the perfect, ultramasculine voice the public expect from a newsreader is flawed to the extent it risks such facade he has built up; his subsequent decision to grow closer to Kay awards him a warning from Evelyn - who frustrates Kay with only subtle illusions to his true intentions - as his hopes to achieve an indomitable self inadvertently backfire. As pitfalls in accomplishing mental stability grow in prominence, Helen receives an unexpected visit from Lynus Preston keen to tell the story of a former VFL player who suffered intense racism during his time playing with Rob, who has inadvertently fomented a controversy with remarks about renegade players defying boycotts of apartheid South Africa. Noelene is stricken by his apparent ignorance of the significance of the subject, and his efforts to educate himself on discrimination's structural elements lead to unwanted outcomes.
17	5	"On the Brink"	Emma Freeman	Niki Aken; Michael Lucas	Mental health system reform	2 March 2025	406,000
11-15 August 1989. Lindsay responds in kind when he learns his position at News at Six is under threat - demonstrating his power and the lengths he has gone to in order to protect his talent - by ripping Helen's life wide open; her past of mental health difficulties front page headlines, to signal to Dale just how easily his true self could also be exposed. Dale readily engages in denial his place at the top of the tower is threatened, but a series of events - finding himself and Tim together again, and Rob now publicly keen to dismantle Lindsay's vituperative empire - attack his sanity and push away one last remaining ally in Kay, who is sick of the self-sacrifice. Helen takes an opposing approach, and rather than react destructively takes the opportunity at hand to devote an edition of Public Eye to Australia's hidden mental health crises and the reforms that could worsen, rather than help, it - and finds herself making an unexpected reunion amongst a touching, honest forthrightness.
18	6	"The Fall"	Emma Freeman	Michael Lucas	Fall of the Berlin Wall	9 March 2025	400,000
7-13 November 1989. Dale's gradual unravelling precipitously hastens, as the concern surrounding the version of himself he puts out to the audience now becomes shared not just by increasingly critical viewers, but by those in the newsroom and the network. Efforts to assuage the concerns of the higher-uppers go awry, as Dale's private life implodes to the point the walls between his personas crumble apart in full colour and sound. Helen's sense of duty and responsibility towards Dale reignites, and empowers her to at last express her desires against the scourge of well-meaning, but officious men in her newsroom, and realise the power that once ebbed away has crashed back full strength without the rightful amount of acknowledgment. Noelene at last musters the confidence to identify herself as her colleagues' equal - as opposed to a permanent underling - and the Walters women reach their limits; via crafty subterfuge, aiming to bring down Lindsay, to eviscerate the cleverly-masked husk of masculinity deficiency that sought to cover up for it by taking control over how the men in their lives coped with their own.

== Release ==
The series premiered on 2 February 2025 at 8:30pm. Many hours earlier, all six episodes were made available on ABC iView.

As with the second series, however, the first episode was first seen at a red-carpet event at the Australian Centre for the Moving Image in Melbourne on 31 January 2025, attended by most cast and crew of the show. It was followed by a Q&A session.

In August 2025, it was confirmed that the third series would be broadcast from 11 September 2025 in the United Kingdom, on BBC Two, with identical scheduling to the previous series (two episodes a week for three weeks); all episodes were concurrently made available on BBC iPlayer on that date. In the run-up to the premiere, double-bills of the second series were shown late on Saturday nights on BBC Four.

== Production ==
In an interview with The Sydney Morning Herald ahead of the broadcast of the second series, Lucas spoke of how a third series of the show was planned, mentioning "real blockbuster" events that he had considered featuring being the Tiananmen Square massacre and the fall of the Berlin Wall, consequently setting the series in mid-late 1989. In an interview on The Newsreader Podcast, he commented on the then-undisclosed prospect of a third series that "you always tend to think dramatically in terms of three acts", and had done so with the characters of Helen and Dale.

=== Confirmation and plotting ===
On 25 September 2023, funding from Screen Australia was confirmed for a third series, with the announcement that director Freeman and writers Lucas, Aken and Russell Wills would return, alongside a new writer, Christine Bartlett, who had previously worked with Lucas on Five Bedrooms. On 6 October, it was revealed that Bartlett would be head writer on the third series, and, like previous series, it would consist of six episodes. On 15 October, following the broadcast of second series finale, Lucas confirmed a third series, that would be set in 1989.

On 9 November, the ABC confirmed that the third series would return in 2024, and air in the latter half of the year, featuring news events such as the Exxon Valdez oil spill, the Tiananmen Square massacre, the boycotts of Apartheid South Africa, and the fall of the Berlin Wall. Lucas added, on the same day, that the series was already in pre-production.

Lucas confirmed in a January 2024 issue of TV Week that the series' first episode would open on the 1989 Logie Awards.

In June 2024, ABC confirmed that the series broadcast had been postponed to 2025. In November 2024, a trailer was released, shortly after it was announced it would broadcast from February 2025.

=== Casting and filming ===
Cast table reads began on 12 December 2023. Filming began on 7 January 2024, at the Neighbours studios in Nunawading, a suburb of Melbourne near its CBD. Set to take place through to March 2024, it concluded on 22 March 2024, after 56 shoot days.

With the start of filming, the series' casting was announced; the main ensemble from the second series return (aside from Fleck Byrne and Gillies), and Daniel Henshall joined the cast as a "major new character". It was later confirmed that Robert Taylor would not return as Geoff, as the character would be killed off off-screen.

Executive producer Werner, while at the AACTAs accepting an award received by director Freeman - for her work on the second series - on her behalf at the ceremony on 10 February, confirmed filming was at the time taking place in Eltham. Post-production ended on 4 September 2024.

A trailer released in November 2024 confirmed that series 2 cast addition Philippa Northeast would remain on the show, her character becoming romantically involved with Dale, and the third series would also feature the return of Hunter Page-Lochard as Lynus Preston. It was also announced that Bert La Bonté would return (having been absent for the second series), with new cast members of Yuchen Wang and Nicolette Minster.

For the filming of the scenes at the 1989 Logies, production staff engaged in assiduous attention-to-detail. The event was functionally recreated in order to facilitate the show's inclusion of the event, and the fictional inclusion of its characters. The scenes were shot at the Hyatt Grand Ballroom in Melbourne, where the Logies in 1989 were actually held; exterior scenes were filmed at Pullman Albert Park, where the 1992 Logies were held. To achieve this, production, costume and make-up designers watched original footage of the 1989 Logies in order to accurately replicate the sets and the sartorial choices of those who attended the event in reality; original footage was intertwined with newly-shot. The decision to feature the Logies in the series necessitated receiving permission from the original nominees for Gold Logie - the most prestigious award given out - especially winner Daryl Somers, as the show was "using his image in a version where he doesn't win." Lim Davidson, who had attended more recent Logies, spoke of how the '80s recreation was "surprisingly similar", but nevertheless - with the digilent recreation - felt like "a bit of a timewarp".

Torv and Reid spoke of their satisfaction at the show ending at three series. Torv commented that "[y]ou want that satisfying arc. You don't want to have to come back and continue to repeat the same things... Whereas I feel like this has been so succinct. The seasons build upon each other and it's like a novel, like you have to end it and let it sit in you, or sit with you". Reid added that the second series was "not the right place to leave these characters on" and "it was always about trying to find the right note to leave them on because we spend a lot of time with them, and you care a lot about them." They spoke of receiving several pieces of props used on set once the show finished production, with Reid receiving his character's computer and television, and Torv receiving "this framed picture of Dale" and a "horrendous" painting from her character's home that "just makes [her] laugh".

All episodes are directed by Freeman. Gypsy Taylor is the new costume designer for the show for this series.

=== Historical accuracy ===
ABC News' Matt Neal found the level of historical inaccuracies in this series relatively low, specifically acclaiming the selection of background music accompaniments, which largely reflected the tracks' position in the charts at the temporal setting of the episodes used in. Aspects that he identified as playing loose with the exact dates, beyond the trivial, included; references to the student protests in China three months prior to their "begin[ning] in earnest"; the fifth episode's focus on closures of mental asylums and institutions was judged overly premature (given 'deinstitutionalisation' was not undertaken to a large degree, especially in the show's geographical setting of the state of Victoria, until the 1990s); a mention of Helen Norville becoming "the first woman in Australian history to be offered a commercial prime time TV show" overlooked Jana Wendt, who had become host of A Current Affair in 1987.

== Reception ==
=== Viewership ===
Between the second and third series, delivery and publication of ratings measurements was fundamentally changed in Australia. Ratings in the metropolitan areas are no longer separately recorded, with a changed focus onto the number of viewers a program has reached (i.e. those who have watched at least 15 seconds or 60 seconds of a program, on-demand or on linear TV respectively); these figures are not reported here for the sake of clarity.

Rating averages (Australia; millions of viewers) On-demand viewership before linear broadcast is excluded from reported numbers, and are thus artificially low.
Ep	Airdate	Overnights (excl. BVOD)	Rank	Overnights (incl. BVOD)	Rank	Consolidated (excl. BVOD)	Rank	Consolidated (incl. BVOD)	Rank	Refs
1	2 February 2025	404,000	12	432,000	12	534,000	9	644,000	9	
2	9 February 2025	339,000	16	360,000	16	417,000	13	486,000	13	
3	16 February 2025	331,000	14	347,000	15	410,000	12	458,000	12	
4	23 February 2025	310,000	17	323,000	16	356,000	16	393,000	14	
5	2 March 2025	314,000	19	326,000	19	374,000	15	406,000	15	
6	9 March 2025	302,000	19	313,000	20	369,000	14	400,000	14	

=== Critical reception ===
The Guardian Australia's Luke Buckmaster was less positive than in previous series; in a review of the first four episodes available to the press, he awarded three stars. Despite praising how the "[w]ell-drawn characters, strong performances and a good pace keep [the] format" of "[d]eploying newsrooms as central settings allow[ing the] screenwriters ... to incorporate past events ... while depicting how they were reported and narrativised" as "engaging", he said this series "dipped a little, losing spark and lustre". He critiqued the exploration of Dale and Helen's personal struggles, finding such "threads [as] reasonably interesting but far from riveting". He further claimed "[s]ome elements feel quite on the nose [and] don't always ring true, in historical and storytelling terms", and that as it "explores certain aspects of the past with a warts-and-all perspective, there's a lingering feeling that the writers are sometimes presenting the past not as it was but how they may wish it to be". He gave examples of the "unusually diverse workplace" depicted, and Noelene being able to maintain a career as she approached and entered motherhood, when women of the era were largely pushed from their jobs not just after having children but during pregnancy; he opined "[a]ccurately portraying history does not mean endorsing it", with "[d]epictions that err on the side of idealism run[ning] the risk of becoming forms of erasure" and "potentially undermining the historical reality of monocultural and patriarchal oppression". He concluded that "storytellers should remain cognisant that characters in period pieces aren't only individual personalities: they're also emblematic of broader experiences", and that in the second series the show had previously been able to ensure that "these issues fade into the background as the characters and performances shine, propped up by intelligent writing and direction."

ScreenHub's Anthony Morris was more enthusiastic, with a four-and-a-half star review. He focused on how the first episode had afford the show a "prime opportunity to do what it does best" - deploy its "big hook" of "mix[ing] archive footage and nostalgia with character-based drama", which Morris claimed had been done with a "winning balance" since its inception. He further noted that while The Newsreader has "always been an ensemble show ... Torv and Reid are the focus" and as "their characters have moved more firmly into the public eye and have become more guarded as a result, their performances have become more subdued", picking out how "Reid gives a masterclass in doing a lot with a little as Dale becomes – in public at least – basically an automaton with really good hair". In The Sydney Morning Herald, Craig Mathieson wrote a four-star review along similar lines - in that it is "hard to be away from Helen and Dale" - praising how "Torv holds Helen's smiling facade until it seems like her body will snap" and "the cold, coiled framing director Emma Freeman applies to Reid's portrayal of Dale", in which Dale is given "an august professional tone to mark his professional ascent [that] makes his private contemplation all the more fascinating". He concludes that "[g]iven what The Newsreader has already achieved, you have to have faith in Lucas and his collaborators sticking the landing" for how "[a] show that initially sounded like a time capsule feels utterly contemporary whenever you look at its protagonists and their melancholic duality" which are "made to compete with each other; they need to complete each other".

In a three-star review of the series published upon its premiere in the United Kingdom, The Guardian's Hannah Davies also lavished praise on the performances of "much of the cast", but opined that she was "not convinced this season sticks the landing" and that there were missed opportunities to explore more of the character of Noelene "as both a working mother and a Korean Australian, wrestling with feeling unseen by her white husband". A three-star review by Ben Dowell in The Times observed that there was some "less than subtle [and] formulaic storytelling" - that nonetheless "does the business" - yet complimented the cast; calling Reid "hugely likeable as Dale", but "the real star" as the "brilliant" Torv.

== See also ==
- The Newsreader
- The Newsreader series 1
- The Newsreader series 2
