= Australia's Next Top Model season 2 =

Australia's Next Top Model
- Season 2
- Judges: Erika Heynatz; Alex Perry; Georges Antoni; Victoria Fisher
- No. of contestants: 13
- Winner: Eboni Stocks
- No. of episodes: 8

Release
- Original network: Fox8
- Original release: 4 January – 22 February 2006

Season chronology
- ← Previous; Season 1 Next → Season 3

Cycle two of Australia's Next Top Model premiered on 4 January 2006 on Fox8. Thirteen contestants were chosen to share an inner city apartment in Sydney for eight weeks while they were competing for the title of Australia's Next Top Model. The cycle's tagline was "Game On!".

The prizes for this cycle included a two-year modelling contract with Chic Model Management, an all expenses paid trip to New York City to meet with Next Model Management, an eight-page editorial in Cleo magazine, a national campaign for Napoleon cosmetics, A$1,500 worth of Lovable lingerie and sleepwear, a Samsung E530 mobile phone, and a cash prize of A$1,000.

The winner of the competition was 19-year-old Eboni Stocks from Hobart, Tasmania.

== Contestants ==
(Ages stated are at start of contest)

Contestant	Age	Height	Hometown	Finish	Place
Sasha Greenoff	22	177 cm (5 ft 9 1/2 in)	Darwin	Episode 1	13
Rebecca Pian	18	180 cm (5 ft 11 in)	Melbourne	Episode 1	12–11
Natalie Giuffre	19	179 cm (5 ft 10 1/2 in)	Perth	Episode 1	12–11
Sophie Miller	18	180 cm (5 ft 11 in)	Brisbane	Episode 2	10
Sarah Lawrence	19	180 cm (5 ft 11 in)	Perth	Episode 3	9
Hiranthi Warusevitane	21	170 cm (5 ft 7 in)	Canberra	Episode 4	8
Caroline Mouflard	18	175 cm (5 ft 9 in)	Byron Bay	Episode 5	7 (quit)
Lara Cameron	18	170 cm (5 ft 7 in)	Perth	Episode 5	6
Louise van Brussel	20	177 cm (5 ft 9 1/2 in)	Adelaide	Episode 6	5
Madeleine Rose	18	175 cm (5 ft 9 in)	Sydney	Episode 7	4
Simone Viljoen	19	174 cm (5 ft 8 1/2 in)	Canberra	Episode 8	3
Jessica French	20	178 cm (5 ft 10 in)	Brisbane	Episode 8	2
Eboni Stocks	19	183 cm (6 ft 0 in)	Hobart	Episode 8	1

=== Judges ===
- Erika Heynatz
- Alex Perry
- Georges Antoni
- Victoria Fisher

=== Other cast members ===
- Michael Azzolini – personal stylist

== Episodes ==
No. overall	No. in season	Title	Original release date
10	1	"Models 24/7"	4 January 2006
The top thirteen contestants arrived at the Holsworthy Army Barracks for an obstacle course challenge that saw Sasha becoming the first contestant sent home for her worst performance. Upon arriving to their new home, the thirteen contestants were surprised to find that they would be sharing the home with a new contestant. After meeting their personal trainer for a fitness session, the models were taught how to walk on the runway. At their first photo shoot, the girls were photographed nude whilst posing with jewellery, both Natalie and Rebecca landed in the bottom two, Erika sent both contestants home.: Special guests: Adam Hill, Craig Wing, Michael Boyd, Victoria Fischer, Andrea & Joen, Jayne Wild; Featured photographer: Dean Tirkot
11	2	"The Girl That Starts A Romance"	11 January 2006
The top ten contestants received makeovers and were later taken to the Napoleon Perdis cosmetics company for a make-up lesson. They then arrived at the Hilton hotel for a party with Beau Brady and Cleo editor Nedahl, in which they were secretly being judged on their behaviour. For the photo shoot the models had to pose with circus staff while dressed in lingerie. The contestants were also treated to a special dinner with cycle 1 winner Gemma Sanderson, Sophie became the fourth contestant sent home.: Special guests: Jayne Wild, Emanuel Perdis, Beau Brady, Nedahl Stelio, Leonie Looser, Mark McVeigh, Andrew Welsh, Adam Hill, Sharon-Lee Hamilton, Gemma Sanderson; Featured photographer: Marc Debnam
12	3	"Letting Out Emotions"	18 January 2006
The top nine contestants took a class at the National Institute of Dramatic Art and were later taken to a theater where they had to perform a series of acting-related tasks. For the photo shoot, each contestant drew a different emotion from a hat that she would later have to portray, Sarah became the fifth contestant sent home.: Special guests: Mark Gaal, Cameron Knight, Rebecca De Unamuno, Justin Hemmes, Christina Fitzgerald, Adam Hill, Connor Beaver; Featured photographer: Georges Antoni
13	4	"Getting-back To Basics"	25 January 2006
The top eight contestants were taken to the bush to meet Tim Jarvis for a lesson on survival skills, and had to spend the night out in tents. Eboni was sent to the hospital after having back pain problems, while the other contestants completed a challenge to abseil down a cliff. At the shoot, the models were styled in country life fashion, Hiranthi became the sixth contestant sent home.: Special guests: Tim Jarvis, Carl Reeves, Rai Thistlethwayte; Featured photographer: Nick Leary
14	5	"The Girl That Had Back Pains"	1 February 2006
Caroline decided to quit of the competition to focus on her university studies, and the top six contestants met Olympic Gold Medalist Elka Graham. During a swimming session, Eboni lost all feeling in one of her arms and was sent to the hospital. The rest of the contestants arrived at Latin Motion Dance Academy and learned a choreographed dance. After a posing challenge with Tigerlilly swimwear, Eboni found out about an artery in her neck could potentially cause her to have a stroke. She subsequently decided to quit the competition. While the other contestants focused on other competition tasks, Erika Heynatz visited Eboni at the hospital and assured her that if the doctors gave the okay, she could come back into the competition. The remaining contestants had a swimwear photo shoot with male models, Lara became the eighth contestant sent home.: Special guests: Adam Hill, Elka Graham, Michael Boyd, Dr. Richard Parkinson, Tracy Baker, Mick O'Rafferty, Jodhi Meares; Featured photographer: Simon Upton
15	6	"Oh-My Cleo"	8 February 2006
The top four contestants travelled to Bridge Climb, and climbed the Sydney Harbour Bridge. It was then revealed that Eboni would be returning to the competition. The contestants were briefed on the importance of the media and being good role models to build their credibility. Tension later ensued over Eboni's return. For the challenge the contestants were interviewed by Natalie Michaels for Sky News. For the photo shoot the models arrived at Central Coast Stadium and learned that they would be shooting a 5-page editorial spread for Cleo magazine, Louise became the ninth contestant sent home.: Special guests: Dr. Richard Parkinson, Peter Metzner, Adam Hill, Natalie Michaels, Peter Evans, Victoria Tullock, Jo Ferguson, Nedahl Stelio
16	7	"Fashion 1.1"	15 February 2006
The contestants learned about marketing and were interviewed by Erika Heynatz before being sent to the Chic Modelling Agency for them to learn how to market themselves. They also had a styling and fashion lesson followed by go-sees. The contestants later had lunch with Antonia Kidman, and attended an event for raising the awareness of breast cancer. For the shoot, the models were suspended from ropes wearing Terry Biviano shoes, Madeleine became the tenth contestant sent home.: Special guests: Ursula Hufnagl, Kathy Ward, Jo Ferguson, Dianne Taylor, Napoleon Perdis, Bianca Spender, Camila & Marc, Wayne Cooper, Antonia Kidman, Terry Biviano, Ashleigh Swift; Featured photographer: Liz Hahn
17	8	"The Girl Who Becomes Australia's Next Top Model"	22 February 2006
The top three Contestants met Australian designer Charlie Brown, and later took part in their final photo shoot before practicing for the final runway show. After Simone became the last contestant sent home, the final two were taken to Cargo Lounge in Sydney Harbour for the final show. The judges deliberated one last time and had a look at the final two's progress throughout the series, and Eboni was revealed to be Australia's Next Top Model.: Special guests: Charlie Brown, Jonathan Pease, Jesse Margolis, Nikita Semak; Featured photographer: Nick Leary

== Summaries ==
Order	Episodes								
Order	1 (Note: In episode 1, Sasha was eliminated outside of the judging panel after being named the worst in an obstacle course challenge. She was replaced by Madeleine that same episode.)	2	3	4	5 (Note: In episode 5, Caroline quit the competition to focus on her studies, whilst Eboni was temporarily removed due to medical issues.)	6	7	8	
1	Eboni	Madeleine	Louise	Madeleine	Simone	Eboni	Jessica	Eboni	Eboni
2	Caroline	Simone	Madeleine	Simone	Madeleine	Simone	Eboni	Jessica	Jessica
3	Jessica	Jessica	Lara	Eboni	Louise	Jessica	Simone	Simone	
4	Simone	Eboni	Simone	Lara	Jessica	Madeleine	Madeleine		
5	Louise	Lara	Caroline	Louise	Lara	Louise			
6	Lara	Caroline	Eboni	Jessica	Eboni				
7	Hiranthi	Louise	Hiranthi	Caroline	Caroline				
8	Madeleine	Hiranthi	Jessica	Hiranthi					
9	Sophie	Sarah	Sarah						
10	Sarah	Sophie							
11-12	Natalie; Rebecca								
13	Sasha								

The contestant was eliminated outside of judging panel
The contestant was eliminated
The contestant was temporarily removed from the competition
The contestant quit the competition
The contestant won the competition

=== Bottom two ===
Episode	Contestants	Eliminated
1	Natalie & Rebecca	
1	Natalie & Rebecca	Sasha
1	Natalie & Rebecca	Rebecca
1	Natalie & Rebecca	Natalie
2	Sarah & Sophie	Sophie
3	Jessica & Sarah	Sarah
4	Caroline & Hiranthi	Hiranthi
5	Jessica & Lara	Caroline
5	Jessica & Lara	Lara
6	Louise & Madeleine	Louise
7	Madeleine & Simone	Madeleine
8	Jessica & Simone	Simone
8	Eboni & Jessica	Jessica

The contestant was eliminated after her first time in the bottom two
The contestant was eliminated after her second time in the bottom two
The contestant quit the competition
The contestant was eliminated in the final judging and placed as the runner-up

=== Average call-out order ===
Final two is not included.

Rank by average	Place	Model	Call-out total	Number of call-outs	Call-out average
1		Eboni	18	7	2.57
2	3	Simone	21	8	2.62
3	4	Madeleine	22	7	3.14
4	2	Jessica	30	8	3.75
5		Louise	26	6	4.33
6		Lara	23	5	4.60
7		Caroline	20	4	5.00
8		Hiranthi	30	4	7.50
9		Sarah	28	3	9.33
10		Sophie	19	2	9.50
11–12		Natalie	11	1	11.00
11–12		Rebecca	11	1	11.00
13		Sasha	—N/a	—N/a	—N/a

=== Photoshoot Guide ===
- Episode 1: Nude shoot with jewellery
- Episode 2: Circus oddities wearing Lovable lingerie
- Episode 3: Screen sirens portraying emotions
- Episode 4: Pioneer women in the countryside
- Episode 5: Azzolini swimwear with male models
- Episode 6: Cleo magazine spread
- Episode 7: Suspended wearing Terry Biviano shoes
- Episode 8: Shaded beauty shots

=== Makeovers ===
- Sophie - Emma Bunton dark blonde, cut short layers and bangs swept
- Sarah - Melanie Brown inspired loose curls and layered
- Hiranthi - Kelis inspired loose wavy black weave
- Caroline - Cate Blanchett strawberry blonde and layers
- Lara - Deborah Harry inspired shoulder length cut and dyed light blonde
- Louise - Shelley Duvall fire engine red and straightened
- Madeleine - Dyed platinum blonde
- Simone - Cut shoulder length
- Jessica - Naomi Campbell inspired short angled line bob with bangs
- Eboni - Dyed jet black and layered with bangs

== Controversies ==
In a surprising twist, Sasha Greenoff was eliminated and Madeleine Rose took her place in the competition. Also, in week 5 Eboni left due to a medical condition but was allowed to return in week 6 despite missing a photoshoot.

After the show, Madeleine, Jessica, Caroline and Simone continued modelling. After being dropped from Chic Management, Eboni signed with Elite Modeling Agency (Aus). Currently, she is working as a sales person in a shoe store and was seen working in a restaurant. Caroline signed with Chic management but decided to pursue her education instead- she attends the university of technology in Sydney and is undertaking a bachelor of Law with a combined bachelor of medical science. In January 2008 Caroline moved to Los Angeles as world renowned NEXT model management expressed its interest in her look. Recently Eboni has signed up to Scene Model Management Eboni's Portfolio - Cardiff is in Wales
