= Holly Wainwright =

Australian novelist, editor, and podcast host

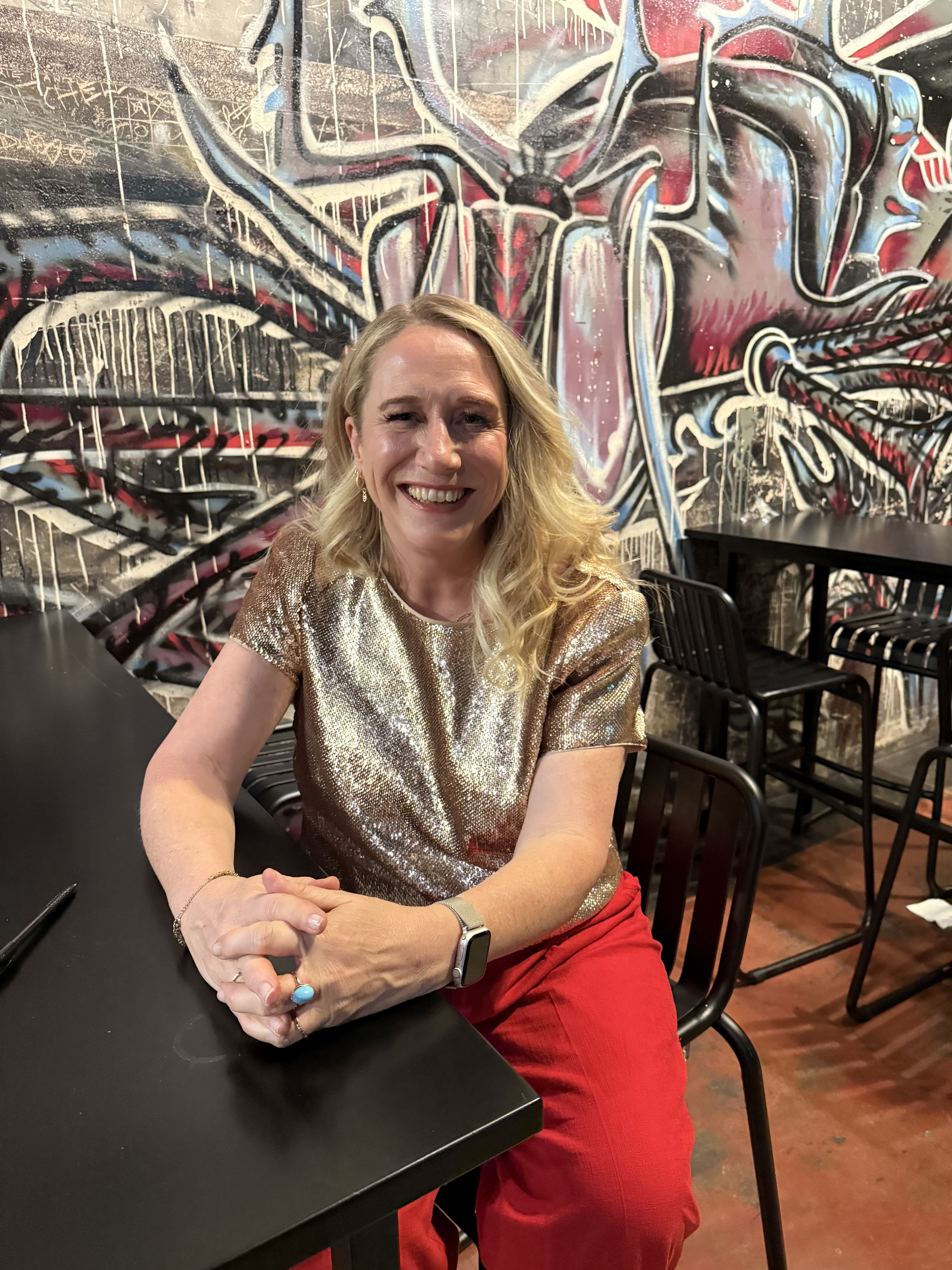
- Holly Wainwright at the Brisbane Powerhouse theatre, July 2025
- Born: 20 December 1971; Manchester, England
- Occupations: Author; Writer; Podcast host
- Children: 2

Holly Wainwright (born 20 December 1971) is a British-Australian writer, author, podcast host, and since 2014, an editor of the Mamamia website.

She was born in Manchester. She came to Australia as a backpacker in 1995 and settled in Sydney. She lived in Coogee for about 20 years.

== Career ==
In Sydney, she worked as a journalist and then editor for travel and celebrity magazines. Among other titles, she worked for Woman's Day.

Wainwright was Deputy Editor for OK! Magazine before joining Mamamia's parenting site iVillage Australia as Editor in 2013. The following year, she was appointed Editor of the main Mamamia site itself. She says that the motivation for her transition from print "gossip magazines" to digital (at a substantial pay cut) was driven by the traditional media becoming "meaner. Especially about women, their relationships and their bodies."

In 2016, Mamamia split into two divisions — news and entertainment — with Wainwright appointed editor of the latter. By 2018, she was Head of Content and was co-hosting Mamamia's flagship podcast Mamamia Out Loud together with Mamamia founder Mia Freedman and Executive Editor Jessie Stephens.

Wainwright has toured with her Mamamia Out Loud co-hosts as they present live shows in a similar format to the podcast to audiences around Australia. They toured in 2018 (Tamworth, Newcastle, Melbourne, Brisbane, Sydney, Dubbo), 2019 (Hobart, Brisbane, Perth, Darwin, Adelaide, Cairns, Orange, Geelong, Sydney), 2022 (Orange, Adelaide, Brisbane, Melbourne Sydney), and 2024 (Brisbane, Melbourne, Sydney). Wainwright has described the live shows as "absolutely one of the best professional experiences I’ve ever had."

=== Novels ===
Five of her novels have been published:

- The Mummy Bloggers (Allen & Unwin, 2017)
- How to be Perfect (Allen & Unwin, 2018)
- I Give My Marriage a Year (Pan Australia, 2020)
- The Couple Upstairs (Pan Australia, 2022)
- He Would Never (Pan Australia, 2025)

Mia Freedman compared the style of her first novel to that of Liane Moriarty and Zoë Foster Blake. Alicia Franceschini in Glam Adelaide wrote that although the book "does sometimes fall into the trap of painting an almost caricature of women’s experiences of motherhood, it never fails to do so with a light-hearted nature and a tongue in cheek self awareness that is rarely seen in modern literature for women."

Writing for the New Zealand Herald, reviewer Hannah Tunnicliffe praised I Give My Marriage a Year for its "back-story, humour, psychological insight and explanations that deepen your interest and attachment" to the characters depicted. Rosalind Moran, reviewing the same book for ArtsHub, concluded "through investigating the personalities and relationships of her characters with a fine-tooth comb, Wainwright prompts the reader to consider their own life and relationships; how these might be fraying at the seams; and whether they might do better."

The Couple Upstairs was listed at #24 on Better Reading's list of the "Top 100 Books of 2023". Dee Young in Brisbanista described it as "a novel that delves into the darker side of human nature, relationships, and where they lead. Is there a way of preventing another person from making similar mistakes to those made by oneself in the past? AND, is intervention an option or should one leave well alone?" The Australian Women's Weekly called it "an important read."

Wainwright's writer's festival appearances include:

- Burdekin Readers and Writers Festival 2018
- Northern Beaches Readers Festival 2022
- Brisbane Writers Festival 2023
- Cairns Tropical Writers Festival 2023
- StoryFest (Shoalhaven) 2023

== Personal life ==
Wainwright has a partner and two children. In 2021, she and her family relocated to regional New South Wales, which she describes as a "treechange".
