= Philippa Northeast =

Australian actress (born 1994)

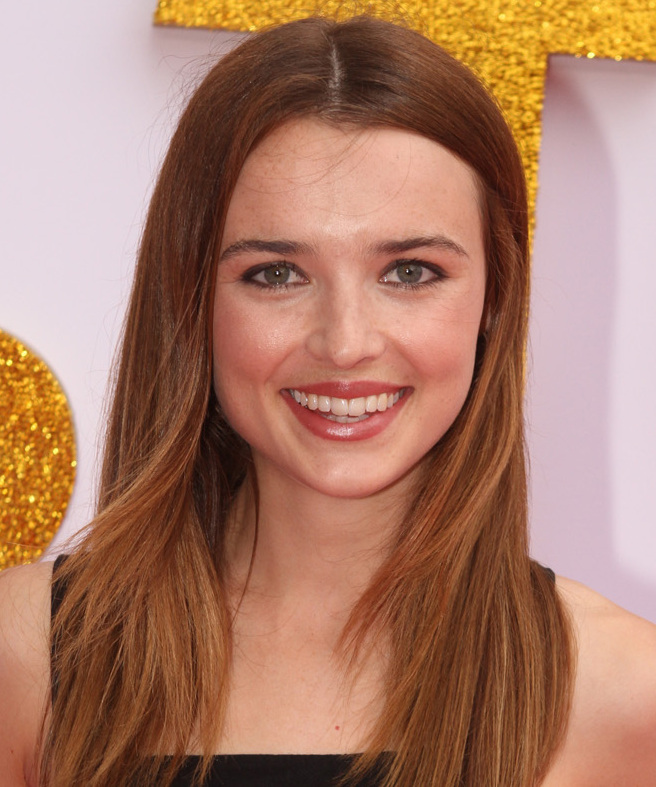
- Northeast in 2018
- Born: 23 September 1994 (age 32); Melbourne, Victoria, Australia
- Occupation: Actress
- Years active: 2003–present
- Partner: Sam Reid (2018–present)

Philippa Northeast (born 23 September 1994) is an Australian actress, known for her role as Evelyn MacGuire in the soap opera Home and Away from 2013 until 2017. After leaving Home and Away, Northeast starred in the 2019 romantic comedy film Standing Up for Sunny with RJ Mitte. She also starred in the Hallmark television film A Royal Runaway Romance (2022). In 2023, Northeast played the recurring role of Lily in the Australian comedy series In Limbo. She was also cast as Kay Walters in the second season of The Newsreader, and joined the supporting cast of Network 10 drama Paper Dolls. She plays Susie Lawson in the 2024 neo-Western series Territory and the lead role of Sybylla in the 2026 Netflix adaptation of Miles Franklin's novel My Brilliant Career.

== Early life and education ==
Philippa Northeast was born on 23 September 1994 and raised in South-East Melbourne along with her four siblings.

She attended Melbourne Rudolf Steiner School, where she completed her VCE. She then began studying a Bachelor of Arts, majoring in criminology, at The University of Melbourne.

Northeast trained at the 16th Street Actors Studio, the St Martin's Youth Theatre, and the Australian Shakespeare Company. She graduated from the Australian Film, Television and Radio School (AFTRS) with an Advanced Diploma in Producing: Story, Audience, Finance in 2015.

== Career ==
Northeast joined the main cast of soap opera Home and Away in 2013 as Evelyn MacGuire, alongside Jake Speer as her character's twin Oscar MacGuire. Northeast found a dollar coin on the steps of her casting agent before attending the audition, which she felt was a sign of good luck. During a callback audition, Northeast was paired with a number of actors as producers tried to find Evelyn's twin. Speer was the first actor to act with her and the producers kept coming back to them, as they noted that they had the right chemistry. Northeast admitted she was surprised to learn that she had won the role. She relocated from her home town of Melbourne to Sydney for filming, and made her first appearance in the show on 3 September 2013. Northeast's character became known for having a fictional curse on her, following the deaths of her on-screen father, siblings and aunt.

After four years of playing Evelyn, Northeast decided to leave Home and Away and her character's exit aired in March 2017. She later made a guest appearance in May 2017 to facilitate the exit of Evelyn's uncle Zac MacGuire (Charlie Clausen). She planned to fly out to Los Angeles to find acting work, but she was also hoping to find roles in Australia.

Northeast stars as barmaid and aspiring comedian Serena in Steven Vidler's 2019 romantic comedy film Standing Up for Sunny, opposite RJ Mitte and Sam Reid. The film was shot in Newtown in 2018. Northeast said she knew the script was "special" the moment she read it, and found that shooting the film was "a different experience" compared to Home and Away. She also guested in an episode of comedy series Bondi Slayer. Northeast flew out to Los Angeles in 2020 to take part in the pilot season and documented her trip for Mamamia. In 2022, Northeast starred in the Hallmark Channel television film A Royal Runaway Romance with Brant Daugherty. She also played the recurring role of Lily in Lucas Taylor's Australian comedy series In Limbo.

Northeast joined the cast of The Newsreader for its second season, which began production in Melbourne in mid-2022. Northeast plays Kay Walters, the daughter of Geoff (Robert Taylor) and Evelyn Walters (Marg Downey). In March 2023, she joined the supporting cast of drama Paper Dolls, along with Lyndon Watts, Carlos Sanson Jr, Ben Turland, and Elizabeth Cullen. The drama was filmed in Sydney for Network 10. The following year, Northeast began starring as Susie Lawson in the Netflix neo-Western series Territory.

She appears in procedural dramedy Good Cop/Bad Cop, which stars Leighton Meester and Luke Cook. Northeast plays Cook's on-screen love interest Dr Marci Laine. On 21 November 2024, Northeast was announced as part of the cast for the ABC six-part drama The Family Next Door, alongside Teresa Palmer and Bella Heathcote. The series is adapted from Sally Hepworth's novel of the same name and was filmed in Victoria. For her performance in The Family Next Door, Northeast received a Logie Award nomination for Best Supporting Actress in a Drama in 2026. On 18 June 2025, Northeast was named as the lead in the Netflix adaptation of Miles Franklin's novel My Brilliant Career.

== Other activities ==
After leaving Home and Away in 2017, Northeast became an ambassador for skincare range Wotnot Naturals, and shot her first campaign for them at the Bondi Icebergs Club.

In 2018 Northeast was an ambassador for the Ration Challenge, in which participants eat the same food rations as a Syrian refugee for a week.

== Personal life ==
Since 2018, Northeast has been in a relationship with Australian actor Sam Reid, whom she acted alongside in Standing Up for Sunny. They have a blue heeler dog named Rani.

== Filmography ==
Year	Title	Role	Notes
2003	Skithouse	Various	Episode: "1.1"
2013–2017	Home and Away	Evelyn MacGuire	Main cast
2019	Standing Up for Sunny	Sunny	Feature film
2019	Drop Dead Weird	Astrid	Episode: "Haunted Hotel"
2020	Bondi Slayer	Pip	Episode: "Home and a Slay"
2022	A Royal Runaway Romance	Amelia Bell	Television film
2023	In Limbo	Lily	Recurring role
2023–2025	The Newsreader	Kay Walters	Recurring role
2023–2024	Paper Dolls	Ally	4 episodes
2024	Territory	Susie Lawson	6 episodes
2025	Good Cop/Bad Cop	Marci Laine	TV series
2025	The Family Next Door	Essie	TV series
2026	My Brilliant Career	Sybylla	
