= Sisters (Australian TV series) =

Australian television series

- Genre: Family drama
- Created by: Jonathan Gavin and Imogen Banks
- Written by: Jonathan Gavin; Michael Lucas; Monica Zanetti; Benjamin Law; Anita Jankovic
- Directed by: Emma Freeman; Shannon Murphy; Corrie Chen
- Starring: Lucy Durack; Antonia Prebble; Maria Angelico; Dan Spielman; Charlie Garber; Lindsay Farris; Zindzi Okenyo; Catherine McClements; Roy Billing; Magda Szubanski; Barry Otto
- Country of origin: Australia
- Original language: English
- No. of seasons: 1
- No. of episodes: 7

Production
- Producers: Imogen Banks; Nicole O'Donohue
- Production locations: Melbourne, Victoria
- Running time: 43 minutes
- Production companies: Shine Productions 3; Endemol Shine Australia

Original release
- Network: Network Ten
- Release: 25 October – 6 December 2017

Sisters is an Australian television drama series, created by Jonathan Gavin and Imogen Banks, and produced by Imogen Banks and Nicole O'Donahue, that screened locally on Network Ten in October 2017 and launched as a Netflix Original Series on September 1, 2018.

== Synopsis ==
Sisters follows the story of Julia Bechly as her life is turned upside-down when her father, in vitro fertilisation pioneer Dr Julius Bechly, publishes a deathbed confession that during his award-winning 30 year career as a fertility specialist, he used his own sperm and is potentially the father of hundreds of children. Julia decides to make the most of the situation and throws a family gathering where she finds out she has hundreds of brothers, but only two sisters: troubled children's television star Roxy Karibas and belligerent lawyer Edie Flanagan.

== Cast ==
=== Main ===
- Maria Angelico as Julia Bechly
- Lucy Durack as Roxy Karibas
- Antonia Prebble as Edie Flanagan
- Barry Otto as Julius Bechly
- Charlie Garber as Isaac Hulme
- Dan Spielman as Tim
- Roy Billing as Ron Karibas
- Magda Szubanski as Diane Karibas
- Catherine McClements as Genevieve
- Lindsay Farris as Carl Logan
- Zindzi Okenyo as Amanda

=== Recurring ===
- Joel Creasey as Oscar
- Remy Hii as Sam
- Maude Davey as Barbara
- Ming-Zhu Hii as Angela
- Zahra Newman as Felicity
- Emily Barclay as Casey
- Ewen Leslie as Abraham
- Deborah Kennedy as Butch

=== Guests ===
- Brett Swain as Norm (1 episode)
- Jane Hall as Natasha Crane (1 episode)

== Episodes ==
No.	Title	Directed by	Written by	Original release date	Prod. code	Australian viewers
1	"Episode 1"	Emma Freeman	Jonathan Gavin	25 October 2017	300687-1	624,000
Julia Bechly is living her usual life caring for her terminally ill father Julius, until a news story reports that Julius used his own sperm during the time he was a fertility specialist. She asks her father if it's true, and he confirms it. Although panicked, Julia decides to throw a “family gathering” to meet all her biological siblings; she discovers she has many, many brothers but only two sisters: troubled children’s television star Roxy Karibas and belligerent lawyer Edie Flanagan. Note: This episode has an extended run time of 75 minutes.
2	"Episode 2"	Emma Freeman	Jonathan Gavin	1 November 2017	300687-2	351,000
3	"Episode 3"	Emma Freeman	Benjamin Law	8 November 2017	300687-3	251,000
4	"Episode 4"	Shannon Murphy	Monica Zanetti	15 November 2017	300687-4	218,000
5	"Episode 5"	Shannon Murphy	Anita Jankovic	22 November 2017	300687-5	150,000
6	"Episode 6"	Corrie Chen	Michael Lucas	29 November 2017	300687-6	172,000
7	"Episode 7"	Corrie Chen	Jonathan Gavin	6 December 2017	300687-7	N/A

== Ratings ==
No.	Title	Air date	Overnight ratings		Consolidated ratings		Total viewers	Ref(s)
No.	Title	Air date	Viewers	Rank	Viewers	Rank	Total viewers	Ref(s)
1	"Episode 1"	25 October 2017	624,000	12	83,000	10	707,000	
2	"Episode 2"	1 November 2017	351,000	—N/a	49,000	19	400,000	
3	"Episode 3"	8 November 2017	251,000	—N/a	—N/a	—N/a	251,000	
4	"Episode 4"	15 November 2017	218,000	—N/a	—N/a	—N/a	218,000	
5	"Episode 5"	22 November 2017		—N/a	—N/a	—N/a		
6	"Episode 6"	29 November 2017		—N/a	—N/a	—N/a		
7	"Episode 7"	6 December 2017		—N/a	—N/a	—N/a		

== American remake ==
In February 2019, U.S. network Fox ordered a pilot for a U.S. remake of Sisters with Annie Weisman and Jason Katims (The Path and Parenthood) producing. Not Just Me was ordered to series on Fox in May 2019, for 2019–20 United States network television season. However in June 2019, reported that the series change the title to Almost Family.
