= Strife (TV series) =

Australian comedy drama television series

- Genre: Comedy drama
- Created by: Sarah Scheller
- Inspired by: Work, Strife, Balance, by Mia Freedman
- Starring: Asher Keddie
- Composer: Piers Burbrook de Vere
- Country of origin: Australia
- Original language: English
- No. of seasons: 2
- No. of episodes: 16

Production
- Executive producers: Katie Amos; Stuart Bowen; Mia Freedman; Alison Hurbert-Burns; Steve Hutensky; Asher Keddie; Bruna Papandrea; Sarah Scheller; Lana Greenhalgh; Jodi Matterson; Brian Walsh; Grainne Brunsdon; Kristen Hodges; Graeme Mason; Christopher Sharp
- Producer: Lorelle Adamson
- Cinematography: Rob Marsh; Tania Lambert
- Editors: Deborah Peart; Laurence van Camp
- Production companies: Made Up Stories; Fifth Season; Screen Australia

Original release
- Network: Binge
- Release: 6 December 2023 – present

Strife is an Australian comedy drama series written and produced by Sarah Scheller. The Binge Original series stars Asher Keddie. It debuted on 6 December 2023. The second series was released on 8 May 2025.

== Synopsis ==
Strife is set around year 2012 and follows Evelyn (Keddie), who is running Eve, a new women's web site. Her personal life is beset by problems; she has abandoned her marriage and marital home, but is struggling to pay the rent on her city apartment. Meanwhile, she navigates co-parenting teenage children with her estranged husband, Jon (Day).

Her fortunes and those of the nascent website change when she writes a confessional column, "I ended my marriage over a flat white" that goes viral.

== Cast ==
- Asher Keddie as Evelyn Jones
- Matt Day as Jon Jones
- Tina Bursill as Ginny
- Emma Lung as Lucy
- Olivia Junkeer as Jeet
- Bebe Bettencourt as Opal
- Jonathan LaPaglia as Peter
- Alex Dimitriades as Daniel
- Lincoln Younes as Giles
- Maria Angelico as Christine
- Rhys Mitchell as Paul
- Bryony Skillington as Penny
- Darcy Tadich as Alex
- Willow Speers as Addy
- Megan Hollier as Leila

== Production ==
=== Season 1 ===
The first season of Strife began production in March 2023, produced by Bruna Papandrea's production company Made Up Stories. The series is inspired by the memoir, Work, Strife, Balance by Mia Freedman. The first season was written and adapted for screen by Sarah Scheller and directed by Stuart Bowen, with Papandrea, Jodi Matterson, Steve Hutensky, Mia Freedman, Asher Keddie, Scheller and Alison Hurbert-Burns serving as executive producers.

=== Season 2 ===
The series was renewed for a second season in January 2024, which wass directed by Neil Sharma, and produced by Lorelle Adamson, with executive producers for the second season including Bruna Papandrea, Steve Hutensky, Katie Amos, Mia Freedman, Sarah Scheller, Alison Hurbert-Burns, Lana Greenhalgh and Asher Keddie.

== Episodes ==
Series	Episodes	Originally released	
Series	Episodes	First released	Last released
1	8	6 December 2023	
2	8	8 May 2025	5 June 2025

=== Season 1 (2023) ===
No. overall	No. in season	Title	Directed by	Written by	Original release date
1	1	"For All Women"	Stuart Bowen	Sarah Scheller	6 December 2023
2	2	"Exposure Therapy"	Stuart Bowen	Sarah Scheller	6 December 2023
3	3	"Burn Our Bras"	Stuart Bowen	Sarah Scheller	6 December 2023
4	4	"A Good Cause"	Stuart Bowen	Clare Stephens; Jessie Stephens	6 December 2023
5	5	"Sacrifice and Power"	Stuart Bowen	Andy Healy	6 December 2023
6	6	"Matricide"	Stuart Bowen	Lexi Freiman	6 December 2023
7	7	"Feminism Is A Bloodsport"	Stuart Bowen	Romina Accurso	6 December 2023
8	8	"The Original Woman"	Stuart Bowen	Sarah Scheller	6 December 2023

=== Season 2 (2025) ===
No. overall	No. in season	Title	Directed by	Written by	Original release date
9	1	"Week of Yes"	Neil Sharma	Sarah Scheller	8 May 2025
10	2	"Whoman"	Neil Sharma	Clare Stephens & Jessie Stephens	15 May 2025
11	3	"Moving On. Getting Over"	Neil Sharma	Andy Healey	15 May 2025
12	4	"Douche Bag"	Neil Sharma	Lexi Freiman	22 May 2025
13	5	"Toxic Boss"	Neil Sharma	Amy Stewart	22 May 2025
14	6	"Little Women"	Neil Sharma	Sarah Scheller	29 May 2025
15	7	"Sometimes Always"	Neil Sharma	Sarah Scheller	29 May 2025
16	8	"Sweet Jane"	Neil Sharma	Sarah Scheller & Mary Coustas	5 June 2025

== Release ==
All eight episodes of the first season of the series were added to Binge in Australia on 6 December 2023. All eight episodes of the first season of the series were added to ThreeNow in New Zealand on 18 February 2024.

The second series was released on 8 May 2025.

== Reception ==
The show broke streaming records for Binge, with the streamer announcing that it had unseated Colin From Accounts in becoming its most successful launch for first day and first week viewing.

Debi Enker from The Sydney Morning Herald praised the series: "Vibrant and richly textured, Strife is keenly in tune with its times even though it's set a decade ago. And Keddie has again fashioned a messy, multi-faceted character who can be as irritating as she is compelling."

Michelle Arrow from The Conversation criticised the series: "Despite claiming to be a "feminist publisher", Evelyn shoots down most politically and socially aware story ideas because they won't "get clicks"." "Perhaps if Evelyn was more willing to confront her own shortcomings we'd have the making of real drama."
