= Chloe Wilson (disambiguation) =

Chloe Wilson is a Northern Irish lawn bowler.

Chloe Wilson may also refer to:

- Chloe Wilson, a runner-up on Australia's Next Top Model season 1
- Chloe Wilson, one half of Australian music duo Sumner
- Chloe, pet dog of wrestler Torrie Wilson

== See also ==
- Chloe Clark Willson, American pioneer
