= Mamamia (website) =

Australian news, opinion and lifestyle website

- Mamamia homepage on 4 June 2017
- Website type: Women's news, opinion, lifestyle
- Owner: Mamamia Women's Network
- Creator: Mia Freedman
- Editors: Rebecca Jacobs; Holly Wainwright; Gemma Garkut
- CEO: Nat Harvey
- Website: mamamia.com.au
- Commercial: Yes
- Launched: 2007; 19 years ago

Mamamia (previously stylised as MamaM!a) is an Australian news, opinion and lifestyle publisher targeted at women. It was created in 2007 by former magazine-editor Mia Freedman as an online blog. The website has since expanded, growing into an online hub for women's news and opinion across many subjects, with over 100 different contributors creating content for the publisher.

== History ==
=== Origin as a blog ===
Mia Freedman started Mamamia in 2007, following her exit from the Nine Network as creative services director. Freedman had previously worked for magazine publisher ACP as editor-in-chief of the Australian editions of Cosmopolitan, Cleo, and Dolly, but left the industry after growing tired of monthly deadlines in the modern 24-hour news cycle. Despite having no experience with online publishing, Freedman was able to draw from her 15 years of experience in the magazine industry to build the site and develop a readership base.

=== Expansion into Mamamia Women's Network ===
In 2010, Jason Lavigne, Freedman's husband, joined the business, and led its transformation from a personal blog into a profitable online media business.

The company launched an Australian variant of iVillage under licence from NBCUniversal in 2012 in an effort to attract advertisers across both sites through a larger combined audience. Compared to Mamamia, iVillage was described as being less edgy and having a more mainstream focus while primarily targeting mothers. Following the launch, Freedman took on the title of publisher and editorial director for the wider business, while former political press secretary Jamila Rizvi became editor.

The website expanded into radio in August 2012 with the launch of radio program Mamamia Today hosted by Emelia Rusciano and Dave Thornton on the Today Network. The show aired throughout Australia between 3 pm and 4 pm weekdays, but was axed within a year due to budget cuts at the network.

Mamamia sought to further expand its audience in 2014 with the launch of The Glow – a health and beauty based platform designed primarily for mobile devices, headed by editor Alyx Gorman. Another sister site, Debrief Daily, was launched in March 2015, targeting the over 40 women's market. Together, the various sites made up the Mamamia Women's Network.

The company took over full control of the iVillage website in June 2015, ending its partnership with NBCUniversal and rebranding the site as The Motherish. It has since become part of the Mamamia umbrella brand.

Mamamia began planning its anticipated move into the US market in mid 2015 following the appointment of Kylie Rogers, a former Network Ten sales director, as managing director of Mamamia Women's Network. In March 2016, it launched its US venture Frank + Flo.

=== Brand consolidation and restructure ===
Mamamia announced in November 2015 that it would be ending its network-style model and consolidating its various brands in the Australian market into its principal site, Mamamia. Content from The Motherish, The Glow, and Debrief Daily would continue to be produced, but would be published via Mamamia in order to avoid fragmenting its audience across destinations. It signalled that it would seek to expand its podcast network and produce more video content. It also aimed to launch Broad Media, a media consultancy business aimed at assisting brands in connecting with a female audience.

The site underwent a major rebrand in August 2016, receiving a new logo and altered slogan, finalising the consolidation of the formerly separate brands into the single Mamamia website. The US site Frank + Flo remained separate but was renamed Spring St.

Following the departure of editor-in-chief Kate de Brito in October 2016, Mamamia announced a major restructure of the business. Editorial control would be split between news content, to be headed by existing deputy editor Gemma Garkut, and entertainment – which was to oversee the creation of all podcast and video content – led by Holly Wainwright. The site appointed Rebecca Jacobs, a former NineMSN executive producer, as editorial and product director of the business – replacing de Brito's role. Mamamia signalled a move into covering a broader range of topics, including sports, finance, and travel.

Mamamia began seeking out prospective investors for the business in December 2016, and is estimated to worth A$80 million on the market.

The publisher now employs over 120 staff, however is restructuring to reduce increased staff turnover.

=== Podcast launch ===
In February 2019, Mamamia launched their first podcast with partner, financial services company MyBudget. The podcast, The Quicky, is a daily podcast that looks to give a rundown of the day's top stories. It now produces over 50 podcasts, including Mamamia Out Loud (hosted by Freedman, Wainwright, and executive editor Jessie Stephens), No Filter, You Beauty and children's podcast, That's Incredible, in partnership with Subaru Australia. Their podcasts are run by Elissa Ratliff. Freedman announced that she would step back from hosting No Filter in July 2026, citing time constraints with other commitments.

=== Staff changes ===
In July 2026, Mamamia announced that Luca Lavigne would become the next CEO of the company in September upon the departure of Nat Harvey, Harvey was CEO of the company since 2024.

== Awards ==
Mamamia has been recognised locally and internationally with industry awards.

Year	Award	Category	Nominee(s)	Result	Ref
2023	Native Advertising Awards	Best Use of Podcast	How To Build a Human	Won	
2022	Mumbrella Publish Awards	Salesperson/Team of the Year	Mamamia Commercial Team	Won	
2021	Australian Podcast Awards	Best Sales House	Mamamia	Won	
2021	Native Advertising Awards	Best Use of Podcast	That's Incredible	Won	
2021	Mumbrella Publish Awards	Best Podcast (Series)	Mamamia Out Loud	Won	
2020	Australian Podcast Awards	Best Branded Podcast	That's Incredible	Won	
2019	Australian Podcast Awards	Business & Marketing	Lady Startup	Won	
2019	Native Advertising Awards	Best Use of Podcast	The Split	Won	
2019	Mumbrella Publish Awards	Best Use of Video	If a man lived like a woman for a day (International Women's Day)	Won	
2019	Mumbrella Publish Awards	Best Podcast	The Quicky	Won	
2018	Australian Podcast Awards	Branded Podcast Winner	Hello, Bump	Won	
2015	Gold Stevie® Award	Women-Run Workplace of the Year - More Than 10 Employees	Mamamia	Won	
2015	Bronze Stevie® Award	Website or Blog of the Year	Mamamia	Won	
2014	B&T Women in Media Awards	Mentor	Mia Freedman	Won	
2013	Mumbrella Awards	Media Brand of The Year	Mamamia	Won	

== Other brands ==
=== Spring St ===
A US-based sister site to Mamamia, Flo & Frank, was launched in March 2016 under the editorial control of Sarah Bryden-Brown. The site offers a range of lifestyle content, similar to its Australian counterpart. Instead of using traditional display ads, the website would use branded content and a e-commerce platform to generate revenue.

In September 2016, Frank + Flo was renamed Spring St following consumer feedback. The company announced that it planned to replicate the success of Mamamia's Australian podcast network by launching a similar female-oriented podcast network under its new Spring St brand.

Following the departure of Bryden-Brown, Jennifer Owens was appointed as editor of the US website in December 2016.

In July 2017, Mamamia announced that it would be scaling back its US venture due to a slow advertising market and strong competition. A number of staff were made redundant after a decision to move the commercial operations of Spring St to Australia, leaving a team of four US-based writers to run the content on the US website. A large proportion of the website's material will continue to be sourced from the Mamamia website but repurposed towards a US audience.
