= The Secrets of Midwives =

2015 novel by Sally Hepworth

- Author: Sally Hepworth
- Publisher: St. Martin's Press
- Publication date: February 10, 2015
- Pages: 320
- ISBN: 978-1-250-05189-9
- Website: The Secrets of Midwives

The Secrets of Midwives is a fiction novel written by Sally Hepworth. Set in New England, the novel is about three generations of midwives and secrets within the family. The novel was published by St. Martin's Press in 2015.

== Background ==
The Secrets of Midwives is the second novel released by Hepworth, and the first novel of hers published in the United States. She wrote the book while pregnant with her second child. The book was released in 2015 and is a novel about three generations of midwives. Her research for the book came from her own questioning of midwives during check-ups and reading fiction and nonfiction books on the subject.

== Summary ==
The story centers around the character Neva Bradley, a third-generation midwife. She is pregnant and wants to keep the identity of the baby's father, including the circumstances surrounding the pregnancy, hidden from her family. Her mother Grace prods Neva for the story, causing Neva to become more private about the details. Neva's grandmother Floss is a retired midwife with a similar secret about her pregnancy from 60 years earlier. The book follows all three through the pregnancy of Neva until the secrets are revealed. The story is set in Rhode Island in both Providence and Conanicut Island. All three characters are midwives (Floss is retired) with each character narrating different chapters of the book.

== Reception ==
KJ Dell'Antonia from The New York Times called it a "fast and fun read," with other reviews of the book coming by way of Publishers Weekly, The Sydney Morning Herald, and Kirkus Reviews. Numerous authors reviewed the book, including Christina Baker Kline who stated that it was a "compelling exploration of life, loss, and love." Emily Giffin called it "a page-turning novel about the complex, lovely, and even heartbreaking relationships between mothers and daughters."
