= The Family Next Door (TV series) =

- Created by: Sarah Scheller (for ABC Television)
- Based on: The Family Next Door by Sally Hepworth
- Written by: Sarah Scheller; Pip Karmel; Julia Moriarty; Andrew Anastasios
- Directed by: Emma Freeman
- Starring: Teresa Palmer; Bella Heathcote; Philippa Northeast; Bob Morley; Catherine McClements; Jane Harber; Ming-Zhu Hii; Daniel Henshall; Maria Angelico; Táne Williams-Accra
- Country of origin: Australia
- Original language: English

Production
- Executive producers: David Ogilvy; Jenny O'Shea; Joel Rice; Meghan Mathes-Smith; Melinda Wearne; Sarah Scheller; Emma Freeman; Sally Hepworth; Rebecca Anderson; Rachel Okine; Aren Prupas; Rob Weisbach
- Production locations: Melbourne, Victoria, Australia
- Cinematography: Craig Barden
- Production companies: Beyond Entertainment; Muse Entertainment

Original release
- Network: ABC Television
- Release: 10 August 2025

The Family Next Door is an Australian television drama series which began airing on 10 August 2025 on ABC Television. Based on the novel of the same name by Sally Hepworth, the series follows the enigmatic Isabelle, who moves into a small seaside cul-de-sac, where her obsessive drive to solve a mystery casts suspicion on four neighbouring families.

At the 2026 Screen Music Awards, music by Bryony Marks was nominated for Best Music for a Television Drama.

== Plot ==
The enigmatic Isabelle moves into a small seaside cul-de-sac where her obsessive drive to solve a mystery casts suspicion on four neighbouring families.

== Cast ==
- Teresa Palmer as Isabelle
- Bella Heathcote as Ange
- Philippa Northeast as Essie
- Bob Morley as Lucas
- Catherine McClements as Barbara
- Ming-Zhu Hii as Fran
- Jane Harber as Lulu
- Daniel Henshall as Nigel
- Maria Angelico as Holly
- Táne Williams-Accra as Ben
- Maude Davey as Helen Gillespie

== Episodes ==
No. overall	No. in season	Title	Directed by	Written by	Original release date	Aus. viewers (National) (Note: On 28 January 2024, OzTAM's ratings data recording system changed. Viewership data will now focus on National Total ratings instead of providing data on the 5 metro centres and overnight shares.)
1	1	"Ange"	Emma Freeman	Sarah Scheller	10 August 2025	415,000
2	2	"Essie"	Emma Freeman	Pip Karmel	17 August 2025	315,000
3	3	"Lulu"	Emma Freeman	Julia Moriarty	24 August 2025	270,000
4	4	"Fran"	Emma Freeman	Pip Karmel	31 August 2025	270,000
5	5	"Isabelle"	Emma Freeman	Andrew Anastasios	7 September 2025	249,000
6	6	"Barbara"	Emma Freeman	Sarah Scheller	14 September 2025	271,000

== Production ==
On 21 October 2024, ABC Television announced three projects were in active production, including the second series of Mystery Road: Origin; Return to Paradise; and a new series, The Family Next Door. The letter went into production in Victoria on 22 November 2024, with funding secured by Screen Australia and VicScreen and co-production by Beyond Entertainment and Muse Entertainment.

The series, which was commissioned by the Australian Broadcasting Corporation, was based on the best-selling novel of the same name by Sally Hepworth. The film adaptation was written by screenwriter Sarah Scheller and co-written by Pip Karmel, Julia Moriarty, and Andrew Anastasios. It was directed by Emma Freeman.

The series was filmed on location in Anglesea, Victoria, and several other sites alongside the nearby coastline. The production created over 200 jobs for cast and crew.

== Release ==
The Family Next Door started airing on ABC Television on Sunday 10 August, with the trailer released days before.
