= Darling Girls =

2023 novel by Australian author Sally Hepworth

- Author: Sally Hepworth
- Language: English
- Genre: Crime novel
- Publisher: Pan Macmillan
- Publication date: 26 September 2023
- Publication place: Australia
- Media type: Print
- Pages: 352 pp.
- Awards: 2024 Ned Kelly Award for Best Novel, winner
- ISBN: 9781761262166

Darling Girls is a 2023 crime novel by the Australian author Sally Hepworth.

It was the winner of the 2024 Ned Kelly Award for Best Novel.

== Synopsis ==
Jessica, Norah, and Alicia were fostered by Miss Fairchild who had rescued them from various family tragedies. But Miss Fairchild was domineering and strict, so, eventually, the girls left home never to return. Twenty-five years later they are brought back to the farm where they grew up after a body is found buried under the main house.

== Critical reception ==
A reviewer for Readings bookstore called it "A thrilling page-turner of sisterhood, secrets, love and murder".

The Ned Kelly Award judges' report praised "Hepworth’s novel as a master read for all crime fiction lovers. Drawing on everyday characters and themes to create an absolutely compelling novel, Darling Girls is cleverly written and exquisitely plotted."

== Awards ==
- 2024 winner Ned Kelly Award for Crime Writing — Best Novel
- 2024 longlisted Colin Roderick Award
- 2024 longlisted Booksellers Choice Award Book People Book of the Year — Adult Fiction Book of the Year

== See also ==
- 2023 in Australian literature
