= Peter Blasina =

Australian television personality

Peter Blasina, otherwise known as "The Gadget Guy", appeared weekly as the Hawaiian shirt-wearing technology reporter on Seven Network's Sunrise breakfast program as well as occasional appearances to provide reports on technology events such as Cebit and other technology fairs.

His weekly segment profiled new technology and explained how different technologies were being integrated into the average consumers' lives as well as providing technology advice in a simplified manner with a target audience of average consumers rather than technologically savvy users.

Blasina would also present at events such as sponsored technology seminars, for fees ranging between $5,000 to $10,000 AUD.

Blasina was also heard on ABC Local Radio program, Nightlife, every month with Tony Delroy, where listeners could call in and ask technological questions.

== Personal ==
Blasina was married to a school teacher with whom he has four children. They separated in 1997. Blasina subsequently met journalist and publisher Anika Hillery. Blasina and Hillary have one child.

== Earlier career ==
In the early 1980s Blasina was a school teacher. He supplemented his income by working part-time as an aerobics instructor and photographer. During this time he was invited to do a photo shoot for Cleo magazine as its non-frontal nude male centrefold model for the month. The photos were published in 1981. Blasina also pursued a career in rugby in his 20s representing Easts rugby union football clubs first-grade team.

== Criticisms ==
Blasina attracted criticism for his thin background in the technologies he showcased, and for not disclosing affiliations with particular companies and brands such as Philips and Samsung. His appearances on the My Business Show typically featured him presenting recommendations to business owners that appear on face value to prioritise low initial cost rather than best practices or value.

Despite his technical knowledge being questioned from time to time, on 28 April 2009 Blasina covered for the Sunrise program the issue of the "Internet Filling Up". During the segment there was a reference to the infamous internet tubes, a statement that the internet was founded in 1996, and a strong push towards naming Cisco switches as a solution to the crisis, Cisco being a company Blasina had known connections with, via the ZyNet television show. This segment has been debunked in the media and by technology specialists, including the Australian political site Crikey. The original source for the segment is a report by Nemertes Research, which in itself has also been heavily criticised for being factually incorrect.
