= Birthright (2025 film) =

Australian comedy film

- Directed by: Zoe Pepper
- Written by: Zoe Pepper
- Produced by: Cody Greenwood
- Starring: Travis Jeffery; Maria Angelico; Michael Hurst; Linda Cropper
- Cinematography: Michael McDermott
- Edited by: Luca Cappelli
- Music by: James Peter Brown
- Production company: Rush Films
- Distributed by: Madman Entertainment
- Release date: 6 June 2025 (Tribeca Film Festival)
- Running time: 94 minutes
- Country: Australia
- Language: English

Birthright is an Australian black-comedy satire film directed by Zoe Pepper. It had its world premiere at Tribeca Film Festival in New York City on 6 June 2025, and is being screened at Australian film festivals through the rest of the year.

== Synopsis ==
Birthright is set against the housing crisis in Australia that makes it very difficult for young people to purchase their first home. Cory and his pregnant wife Jasmin are moving out of their rental property and into a home on the outskirts of the city owned Cory's parents Richard and Lyn.

== Cast ==
- Travis Jeffery as Cory
- Maria Angelico as Cory's wife Jasmine
- Michael Hurst as Richard, Cory's father
- Linda Cropper as Lyn, Cory's mother

== Production ==
The film, which started production in Western Australia in 2023, is directed by Western Australian director Zoe Pepper, in her feature film debut. She has previously directed many live performances as a theatre director and playwright, including directing and co-writing The Irresistible, which was performed at Dark Mofo festival and the Sydney Opera House, and was nominated for the Helpmann Award for Best Play. She also co-wrote and directed the web series The Big Spaghetti. She also did some writing on the comedy thriller TV series Population 11.

Birthright was produced by Cody Greenwood and edited by Luca Cappelli. Cinematography was by Michael McDermott, and the score was composed by James Peter Brown. The film received production support from Screen Australia, and the production company is Rush Films.

Filming took place in the Perth Hills over five weeks in 2024.

== Release ==
Birthright had its world premiere at the 2025 Tribeca Film Festival in New York City, on 6 June 2025, in the "Escape from Tribeca" section.

In Australia, it has been screened at the Sydney Film Festival (June 2025), and Melbourne International Film Festival (August 2025), and at both the Adelaide Film Festival and Byron Bay Film Festival in October 2025.

== Reception ==
On the review aggregator website Rotten Tomatoes, 73% of 11 critics' reviews are positive.

Alexandra Heller-Nicholas, reviewing the film for the Alliance of Women Film Journalists after its screening at Tribeca, compared Birthright with other single-location, low-budget, Australian genre films, such as Matt Vesely's Monolith and Indianna Bell and Josiah Allen's You'll Never Find Me. She says that these two, and others, are "collective masterclasses in doing a lot with a little". Heller-Nicholas writes "While black comedy often blurs with absurdity, in Birthright this is replaced with what at times is so authentic as to almost veer into documentary realism".

Kat Hughes, writing in The Hollywood News, gave the film 3 out of 5 stars, writing "The aspect of Birthright's story that works so well is its exploration about the generational divide, especially in relation to poverty".

Irresistible magazine called Birthright a "funny, dark, and charming film", and praised the actors' performances.
