= Sally Hepworth =

Australian novelist

- Occupation: Writer
- Notable work: The Secrets of Midwives Darling Girls
- Website: sallyhepworthauthor.com

Sally Hepworth is an Australian writer. She is best known for her novel The Secrets of Midwives, published in 2015. Her book The Good Sister won the 2021 Davitt Award in the Adult Novel category.

== Early life ==
Sally Hepworth grew up in Melbourne, Australia. Hepworth worked in both event management and human resources prior to becoming a writer.

== Career ==
While on maternity leave with her first child, Hepworth wrote Love Like the French, a novel about a British woman who goes to France after an accident leaves her husband in a coma. The book was eventually published in Germany in 2014.

In 2015, Hepworth released a second book, The Secrets of Midwives, that she wrote while pregnant with her second child. The novel is about three generations of midwives. Her research for the book came from her own questions to midwives during check-ups, as well as reading fiction and nonfiction books on the subject. KJ Dell'Antonia of The New York Times called it a "fast and fun read." It received middling to positive reviews in Publishers Weekly, The Sydney Morning Herald, and Kirkus Reviews.

Hepworth released The Things We Keep in 2016, The Mother's Promise in 2017, and The Family Next Door in 2018. The Family Next Door was Hepworth's first novel set in her hometown of Melbourne, a trend she continued in her 2019 novel The Mother-in-Law.

In 2024, she released Darling Girls, which won a Ned Kelly Award for Best Novel. Her 2025 crime novel, Mad Mabel, won both the General Fiction Book of the Year and the Audio Book of the Year at the 2026 Australian Book Industry Awards. Mad Mabel also won the 2026 Ned Kelly Award for Best Novel.

== Adaptations ==
The Family Next Door was made into The Family Next Door (TV series) with scripts by Sarah Scheller, Pip Karmel, Julia Moriarty, and Andrew Anastasios. The series, directed by Emma Freeman, premiered on ABC Television in August 2025.

== Personal life ==
Hepworth has three children from her former marriage. She lives in Melbourne.

== Bibliography ==
Publication year	Title	Original publisher	ISBN
2025	Mad Mabel	Pan MacMillan Australia	ISBN 9781761266492
2024	Darling Girls	St. Martin's Press	ISBN 9781250284525
2023	The Soulmate	St. Martin's Press	ISBN 9781250229700
2022	The Younger Wife	St. Martin's Press	ISBN 9781250229618
2020	The Good Sister	St. Martin's Press	ISBN 9781760552190
2019	The Mother-in-Law	St. Martin's Press	ISBN 9781760552183
2018	The Family Next Door	St. Martin's Press	ISBN 9781250120892
2017	The Mother's Promise	St. Martin's Press	ISBN 9781250077752
2016	The Things We Keep	St. Martin's Press	ISBN 9781250051929
2015	The Secrets of Midwives	St. Martin's Press	ISBN 9781250051899
2014	Love Like the French	Random House Germany	ISBN 9783442382538
