= Australia's Next Top Model season 1 =

Australia's Next Top Model
- Season 1
- Judges: Erika Heynatz; Alex Perry; Ken Thompson; Marguerite Kramer
- No. of contestants: 10
- Winner: Gemma Sanderson
- No. of episodes: 8

Release
- Original network: Fox8
- Original release: 11 January – 1 March 2005

Season chronology
- Next → Season 2

Cycle one of Australia's Next Top Model began airing on 11 January 2005 on Fox8. The ten contestants from around the country chosen for the competition converged in Sydney, where they spent eight weeks sharing an inner city apartment while competing for the title of Australia's Next Top Model. The series finale was held in Melbourne.

The prizes for winning the first cycle of Australia's Next Top Model included a modelling contract with Chic Model Management, an all-expenses paid trip to Milan to meet with Italian modeling agency Fashion, an eight-page editorial in Cleo magazine, and a national campaign for Napoleon cosmetics.

The winner of the competition was 22-year-old Gemma Sanderson from Newcastle.

== Contestants ==
(Ages stated are at start of contest)

Contestant	Age	Height	Hometown	Finish	Place
Naomi Thompson	22	170 cm (5 ft 7 in)	Townsville	Episode 1	10
Nicole Fraser	19	179 cm (5 ft 10 1/2 in)	Albury	Episode 2	9
Atong Tulba Mulual	19	177 cm (5 ft 9 1/2 in)	Sydney	Episode 3	8
Allana Ridge	19	180 cm (5 ft 11 in)	Sydney	Episode 4	7 (quit)
Zoe McDonald	20	183 cm (6 ft 0 in)	Gold Coast	Episode 5	6
Simmone Duckmanton	18	176 cm (5 ft 9 1/2 in)	Melbourne	Episode 6	5
Sam Morley	20	176 cm (5 ft 9 1/2 in)	Gold Coast	Episode 7	4
Shannon McGuire	19	173 cm (5 ft 8 in)	Perth	Episode 8	3
Chloe Wilson	19	175 cm (5 ft 9 in)	Adelaide	Episode 8	2
Gemma Sanderson	22	178 cm (5 ft 10 in)	Newcastle	Episode 8	1

=== Judges ===
- Erika Heynatz
- Alex Perry
- Ken Thompson
- Marguerite Kramer

=== Other cast members ===
- Michael Azzolini – personal stylist

== Episodes ==
No. overall	No. in season	Title	Original release date
1	1	"The Girl Who Makes a Poor Mark"	11 January 2005
The top ten aspiring contestants met Erika Heynatz and Alex Perry for a runway show in front of an audience. After moving into their new apartment, the contestants were briefed on the importance of fitness and healthy eating. They were later introduced to the Sydney social scene at an A-List cocktail party, and received waxes in preparation for a bikini shoot on the beach, Naomi became the first contestant sent home.: Special guests: Brad Spence, Napoleon Perdis; Featured photographer: Nick Leary
2	2	"The Girl Who Strikes Again"	18 January 2005
The top nine contestants received a horse riding lesson before heading over to a dance studio to learn how to walk on the runway. The winner of the lesson was chosen to meet Miss Universe, Jennifer Hawkins. The contestants later took part in a horseback photo shoot, Nicole became the second contestant sent home.: Special guests: Mink Sadowsky, Jennifer Hawkins, Gina Byrne, Christina Fitzgerald, Sharon-Lee Hamilton, Sally Sharpe; Featured photographer: Nick Leary
3	3	"The Girl Who Breaks the Edge"	25 January 2005
The top eight contestants received makeovers at the Joh Bailey salon, and were shot in pairs at a Manor in Sydney wearing lingerie. They later took part in an exercise and makeup challenge, Atong became the third contestant sent home: Special guests: Joh Bailey, Emanuel Perdis, Kostya Tszyu; Featured photographer: Steven Chee
4	4	"The Girl Who Loses Her Faith"	1 February 2005
The top seven contestants received acting and pole dancing lessons, later followed by an acting challenge. While the winners of the challenge attended a launch party, the losers shot a commercial for Venus. Allana decided to quit the competition, and the remaining contestants took part in a spider beauty shoot, despite Allana quitting the competition, both Zoe and Chloe were allowed to remain in the competition.: Special guests: Dean Carey, Blair McDonough, Jens Hertzum, Steve Fellenberg; Featured photographer: Sam Borich
5	5	"The Girl Who Has The Flaws"	8 February 2005
The top six contestants learned about body movement and language, before receiving tips on their runway walks and poses. They learned salesmanship skills in an interview, and one contestant revealed that she suffered from depression. The contestants took part in a runway show for the media, and had interviews with Cleo magazine editor Nedahl Stelio. The girls later arrived at Circular Quay for an intimate photo shoot with Olympic swimmer Geoff Huegill, Zoe became the fifth contestant sent home.: Special guests: Prue Macsween, Nikki Andrews, Joh Bailey, Nedahl Stelio, Geoff Huegill; Featured photographer: Michelle Holden
6	6	"The Girl Who Breaks Down"	15 February 2005
The top five contestants arrived at Fitness First where they had a fitness session with Brad Spence. They later learned about tap dancing, and received a visit from a clairvoyant to talk about their personal lives. The contestants had a dancing and endurance challenge before visiting a pole dancing studio for their photo shoot, Simmone became the sixth contestant sent home.: Special guests: Brad Spence, Ben Read, Marlene Stoten, Sally Sharpe, Stephen Lee; Featured photographer: Andrew Gash
7	7	"The Girl Who Has One Look"	22 February 2005
The top four contestants learned about go-sees and had a wardrobe lesson, before putting their skills to the test in a shopping challenge to put together an outfit that suited their personal style. Later, the models stripped for an exotic high fashion photo shoot session in which they wore nothing but gold foil, Sam became the seventh contestant sent home.: Special guests: Nicole Zimmerman, Simone Zimmerman, Brad Ngata, June Dally-Watkins; Featured photographer: Nick Leary
8	8	"The Girl Who Becomes Australia's Next Top Model"	1 March 2005
The top three contestants received a second set of makeovers and were flown to Melbourne for the grand finale. There, they took part in a cosmetics shoot and arrived at the Zambesi clothing retailer line to meet Elisabeth Findlay for a casting challenge. They later attended a red carpet party for Mercedes Australian fashion week, before Shannon became the last contestant sent home. The final two competed in a final runway show, and Gemma was declared to be Australia's Next Top Model.: Special guests: Napoleon Perdis, Nicola Finetti, Elisabeth Findlay; Featured photographer: Monty Cole
9	9	"Reunited and Exposed"	8 March 2005
The cycle 1 contestants reunited to discuss their time and experiences on the show and tried to settle old scores in the process.

== Summaries ==
Order	Episodes								
Order	1	2	3	4 (Note: In episode 4, Allana quit the competition. As a result of her decision to quit, no contestants were eliminated that episode.)	5	6	7	8	
1	Chloe	Gemma	Simmone	Shannon	Chloe	Sam	Shannon	Chloe	Gemma
2	Allana	Sam	Gemma	Sam	Sam	Shannon	Gemma	Gemma	Chloe
3	Simmone	Shannon	Sam	Simmone	Simmone	Chloe	Chloe	Shannon	
4	Shannon	Chloe	Zoe	Gemma	Gemma	Gemma	Sam		
5	Zoe	Simmone	Chloe	Chloe; Zoe	Shannon	Simmone			
6	Gemma	Atong	Shannon	Chloe; Zoe	Zoe				
7	Sam	Zoe	Allana	Allana					
8	Atong	Allana	Atong						
9	Nicole	Nicole							
10	Naomi								

The contestant was eliminated.
The contestant quit the competition.
The contestant was part of a non-elimination bottom two.
The contestant won the competition.

=== Bottom two ===
Episode	Contestants	Eliminated
1	Naomi & Nicole	Naomi
2	Allana & Nicole	Nicole
3	Allana & Atong	Atong
4	Chloe & Zoe	Allana
5	Shannon & Zoe	Zoe
6	Gemma & Simone	Simmone
7	Chloe & Sam	Sam
8	Gemma & Shannon	Shannon
8	Chloe & Gemma	Chloe

The contestant was eliminated after her first time in the bottom two/three
The contestant was eliminated after her second time in the bottom two/three
The contestant quit the competition
The contestant was eliminated in the final judging and placed as the runner-up

=== Average call-out order ===
Final two is not included.

Rank by average	Place	Model	Call-out total	Number of call-outs	Call-out average
1	2	Chloe	23	8	2.87
2	4	Sam	21	7	3.00
3–4	1	Gemma	25	8	3.12
3–4	3	Shannon	25	8	3.12
5		Simmone	20	6	3.33
6		Zoe	27	5	5.40
7		Allana	17	3	5.67
8		Atong	22	3	7.33
9		Nicole	18	2	9.00
10		Naomi	10	1	10.00

=== Photoshoot Guide ===
- Episode 1: Rogue swimsuits on the beach
- Episode 2: Horseback riding
- Episode 3: Lingerie in pairs
- Episode 4: Beauty shots with a tarantula
- Episode 5: Posing with Geoff Huegill
- Episode 6: Pole dancing
- Episode 7: Nude with gold foil
- Episode 8: Cosmetics beauty shots

=== Makeovers ===
- Atong – Brigitte Bardot inspired long straight light brown hair extensions with bangs
- Allana – Jessica Simpson strawberry blonde and dark blonde extensions removed
- Zoe – Dyed jet black and trimmed
- Simmone – Marilyn Monroe light blonde pixie cut
- Sam – Megan Gale dark brown and layered with bangs
- Shannon – Victoria Beckham inspired pixie cut and dyed light brown with highlights; later, Katie Holmes inspired angled line bob and dyed black
- Chloe – Julianne Moore red; later, dyed light red
- Gemma – Paulina Porizkova brown and layered; later, dyed light brown
