= Standing Up for Sunny =

2019 film directed by Steven Vidler

- Theatrical movie poster
- Directed by: Steven Vidler
- Written by: Steven Vidler
- Produced by: Drew Bailey; Jamie Hilton; Michael Pontin
- Starring: RJ Mitte; Philippa Northeast; Sam Reid; Matt Nable
- Cinematography: Mark Bliss
- Edited by: Dany Cooper
- Music by: Caitlin Yeo
- Production companies: See Pictures; Spectrum Films; Ticket to Ride
- Distributed by: Madman Entertainment
- Release date: 12 June 2019 (Sydney Film Festival)
- Running time: 105 minutes
- Country: Australia
- Language: English

Standing Up for Sunny is a 2019 Australian film comedy written and directed by Steven Vidler, and starring RJ Mitte, Philippa Northeast, Sam Reid and Matt Nable. It won the 2020 AACTA Award for Best Indie Film.

== Synopsis ==
An isolated man with cerebral palsy is railroaded into helping an unassertive comedienne, and finds love and acceptance through stand-up comedy.

== Cast ==
- RJ Mitte as Travis
- Philippa Northeast as Sunny
- Sam Reid as Mikey
- Matt Nable as Male Interviewer
- Barry Humphries as himself
- Ella Scott Lynch as Felicity
- Italia Hunt as Gordo

== Production ==
Filming took place in Sydney, New South Wales, Australia in 2018.

== Release ==
The film premiered at the Sydney Film Festival in June 2019.

It was also shown at CinefestOZ to a packed audience in September 2019.

The general release date was 5 December 2019.

== Reception ==
Standing Up for Sunny received favourable reviews from Australian critics.

Andrew F. Peirce of The Curb said, "It’s so rare to see a film that shines this brightly, and it’s so rare to see one that gives people with disabilities the chance to be funny".

Matthew Eeles of Cinema Australia called the film, "Tender, clever and very, very funny".

Julian Wood at Filmink said, "The film is certainly amiable, and the low budget gives it a sense of immediacy and authenticity".

Isobel Sanby at Newsworthy gave the film four stars and stated, "What Standing Up for Sunny communicates is that it is not just representation on screen that needs to be addressed, it is accessibility holistically".

== Awards and nominations ==
Standing Up for Sunny won the 2020 AACTA Award for Best Indie Film in the 10th AACTA Awards.
