= Gemma Sanderson =

Australian model (born 1983)

- Born: 10 July 1983 (age 42); Newcastle, New South Wales, Australia
- Years active: 2005–present
- Modeling information
- Height: 5 ft 10 in (1.78 m)
- Hair color: Brown
- Eye color: Hazel
- Agency: Chic Model Management; Beatrice International Model Management; Next Management; Storm Management; Ice Model Management

Gemma Sanderson (born 10 July 1983) is an Australian model, best known for winning the first cycle of the reality television show Australia's Next Top Model.

== Early career ==
Prior to winning in Australia's Next Top Model, Sanderson was a finalist in Dolly's annual model search, which fellow Australian model Miranda Kerr had won the previous year.

== Australia's Next Top Model ==
Sanderson was criticized during the final weeks of the show in regard to her suffering from depression, which she admitted to during episode 5. Sanderson won a number of challenges, showing early favoritism from judge Marguerite Kramer (former Harper's Bazaar editor). Sanderson won the show and went on to model both in Australia and internationally, having been represented by Next Management in New York, Chic Management in Sydney, Beatrice Models in Milan, and Storm Management in London.

== Career ==
Internationally, she has shot for Macy's, Tchibo, Auchan, and the ASOS catalogue. She portrays the angel girlfriend in Axe and Lynx advertisements.

In Australia and New Zealand, her advertising and fashion campaigns include Jeans West, David Jones, and Myer, while she has appeared in magazines like Dolly, Frankie, Cleo, Marie Claire and FHM. Internationally, she has appeared on the covers of Escape (Hong Kong) and Silhouette (Italy), and in Elle, Maxim, Jack and Grazia (UK).

Sanderson has walked in Australian Fashion Weeks, for leading Australian and New Zealand designers Lisa Ho, Alannah Hill, Trelise Cooper, David Jones, and Myer.

Preceded by None	Australia's Next Top Model winner Cycle 1 (2005)	Succeeded by Eboni Stocks
