= Dolly (magazine) =

Australian teen magazine

- A cover of Dolly, featuring Demi Lovato, August 2015.
- Editor: Josephine Rozenberg-Clarke
- Frequency: Bimonthly
- Circulation: 28,030
- Publisher: Mercury Capital
- Founded: 1970
- Final issue: December 2016 (print)
- Company: Bauer Media Group; Mercury Capital (June 2020–present)
- Country: Australia
- Based in: Sydney
- Website: dolly.com.au (defunct)

Dolly (stylised in all-caps) was an Australian bimonthly teen magazine started in 1970 by Fairfax Ltd. in Australia and New Zealand, and purchased by ACP in 1988. The magazine produced over 400 issues and had a readership of 505,000 in 2007. The print edition ceased in December 2016, at which point the magazine became online only. In June 2020, the magazine was purchased from the Bauer Media Group by Mercury Capital. As of September 2023, the Dolly website ceased and now redirects to the website for Girlfriend.

Dolly was the basis and inspiration for Sassy Magazine (1987–1996) in the United States. The magazine was aimed at girls aged 13–17 and covered celebrity news and gossip, fashion and beauty and various feature articles aimed at or dealing with issues faced by teenage girls.

== History ==
The magazine was launched by Anne Goldie in 1970.

The editor was Josephine Rozenberg-Clarke. The previous editor was Lucy Cousins. The magazine had its headquarters in Sydney.

In November 2016 it was announced that the December 2016 issue would be the last print issue of Dolly.

In June 2020, Dolly was acquired by Sydney investment firm Mercury Capital as part of its acquisition of the Bauer Media Group's former Australian and New Zealand titles.

== Dolly Model competition ==
The Dolly Model Competition was a branch from the Dolly magazine. It is a competition held for teen readers to enter to have the chance to win a modelling career. The competition started in 1979, with Helen Moyes appearing on the December 1979 issue as the first winner and ended in 2002 when the then editor in chief of Dolly, Mia Freedman felt it gave a negative impression towards young teenage girls and the Dolly brand. In 2012 it returned after a 10-year hiatus, with the winner announced as 13-year-old Kirsty Thatcher from Brisbane, Australia. The winner was awarded a one-year contract with Chadwick Modeling agency, a trip to New York to meet with Chadwick's US affiliates, and a fashion and cover shoot on Dolly.

Past Winners

Year	Winner	Finalists
1979	Helen Moyes	missing
1980–1989	missing	
1990	Danella Boyle	Letichia Richardson, Monique Grobben, Jacinda Barrett, Simone Tassicker, Catherine Jenkins
1991	Rebecca Kelly	Celeste Gibbins, Susan Bawden, Alexandra Pike, Cressida Wilson, Danah Mitchell
1992	Olivia Trick	Daniela Bej, Tasha Olsen, Kate Lillicrapp, Valerie Anthonisz, Amanda Cruwys
1993	Emma Gorrod	Amanda Tacey, Tracey Grose, Emma-Kate Harrison, Saara Hentschke, Joanna Stanaway-Becker
1994	Shannan Camilleri	Tania Batur, Amy Erbacher, Bianca Denham, Rosanna Mabilia, Emma Harrison
1995	Elle Wright	Natalie Decorte, Natasha Norton, Karen James, Nikki Okunev, Lydia Simunovic
1996	Renee Schwab	Amber Lee, Heather Pennell, Tasha King, Wymeng Wong, Gemma Hamilton
1997	Miranda Kerr	Carlie Draeger, Bekky Buchanan, Abbie Cornish, Cassie Hunter, Kirsty Short
1998	Pia Loyola	Joline Lootsma, Sally Winnett, Anna Rawson, Kathy Zachwieja, Gemma Sanderson
1999	Cassidy Light	Lisa Johnston, Paloma, Kathryn, Teresa, Jessica
2000	Jessica Hart	Shadae Magdson, Emma, Kate
2001	Jessica Elsegood	Natasha George, Tara Horsburgh, Rose Turner
2002	missing	Eunice Ward
2003–2011	competition not held	
2012	Kirsty Thatcher	Elodie Russell, Lucinda Crichton, Paige Garvey, Lillian Van Der Veen, Ayasha Alderson
2013	Samantha Garza	Angel Larkin, Emelia Roberts, Lucy Kleinhans, Neema Young, Dayna Opitz
2014	Mary Stickley	Tylah Morgan, Vienna Anderson, Emma Tenaglia, Jesper Ha, Sarah Danga

== Dolly Doctor ==
Dolly Doctor was a segment that ran in Dolly since its first issue to answer readers' health questions.

Dr. John Wright was the first Dolly Doctor. Dr. Melissa Kang served as the Dolly Doctor from 1993 until it closed in 2016. A Dolly Doctor standalone app was released in 2015.

A comparison of Dolly Doctor with other Australian magazines found that Dolly Doctor gave the most accurate health advice.

== Controversy ==
In 2005, Dolly came into media attention for taking advantage of young people wanting to get into the magazine industry. Dolly was accused of soliciting, publishing and ridiculing unpaid articles from hopeful young women looking for a job in magazine journalism.

In Dolly's May 2007, a picture of a runway model's genitalia was published in a section called Dollywood Gossip. The accompanying caption included an arrow pointing to the model's genital region, and said "Look Closer, Eww! Not that close" and "Umm, we think you forgot something". Editor Bronwyn McCahon stated that "we did cover the area originally, and the little spot we used somehow fell off the page just before printing and we didn't notice".
