= Maria Angelico =

Australian actress, writer and producer

- Born: Melbourne, Australia
- Occupations: Actor, writer, and producer
- Years active: 2001–present

Maria Angelico is an Australian actress, writer and producer from Melbourne, Victoria. Angelico is best known for her portrayal of Julia Bechly in the TV series Sisters on Network Ten (2017), as Miss Tan in The InBESTigators (2019), and as Angie Sanford in the ABC Television drama Stateless in 2020. From 2023 she has starred in the Binge Original comedy series Strife. In 2025, she plays lead roles in the TV series The Family Next Door and the feature film Birthright.

== Early life and education ==
Maria Angelico was born in Melbourne, Australia.

In 2002, Angelico received a place in the inaugural scholarship course at the Melbourne Theatre Company, and studied at the Susan Batson studio in New York, then undertook vocal and dialect training.

In 2010 Angelico completed the part-time acting program at 16th Street Actors Studio in Melbourne.

== Career ==
Angelico acted in several TV series, including Blue Heelers as teenager Jassy Kennedy in 2001, and appeared again in that series as Bianca Amalti in 2004, Neighbours, and a recurring role in Chris Lilley's We Can be Heroes . She continued working professionally as an actor throughout her teenage years.

In 2015, Angelico wrote, produced and starred in the web series Movement: the web series about a woman named Sophia who needs to sort out her life after making bad decisions and attempting to stay in control. She won the 2016 Spotlight on Melbourne WebFest award and was selected for the digital creators showcase at TriBeCa film festival 2016.

She appeared as Florence in the web series Other People's Problems in 2017. Angelico starred in the lead role of Daphna in the stage play Bad Jews which toured nationally in Australia during 2015–2016.

In 2017, Ashe starred as Julia Bechly in the TV drama series Sisters on Network Ten.

On 26 March 2023, Angelico was announced in the cast for the first season of the Foxtel show Strife. On 8 August 2024, it was announced that season two had begun production and Angelico would reprise her role from series one.

On 22 November 2024, Angelico was named for the ABC drama The Family Next Door, which aired in July 2025.

She plays the character of Jasmine in Zoe Pepper's feature film directorial debut, Birthright, which premiered at Tribeca Film Festival in New York City in June 2025.

== Filmography ==
=== Film ===
Year	Title	Role	Notes
2002	Take Away	Undesirable Teen	Actor
2005	Hating Alison Ashley	Sophie	Actor
2007	My Sister and I	Nina	Actor
2008	Under a Red Moon	Natalie	Actor
2009	Blessed	Morgue Receptionist	Actor
2010	Stalker	Jan	Actor
2011	The Fat Lady Swings	Maria	Actor
2012	10Terorists	Tree Hugger, Jarrah	Actor
2012	Underground: The Julian Assange Story	Maureen	Actor
2013	The War	Fiona	Voice Actor
2014	Small	Amy	Actor
2023	Favourites	Sam	Short
2025	Birthright	Jasmine	Lead role

=== Television ===
Year	Title	Role	Notes	Ref
2001	Blue Heelers	Jassy Kennedy	1 episode	
2004	Blue Heelers	Bianca Amalti	1 episode	
2005	We Can Be Heroes: Finding The Australian of the Year	Mel	6 episodes	
2008	Bogan Pride	Girl at Canteen	1 episode	
2009	Home and Away	Kayla Deboer	1 episode	
2009	City Homicide	Rhiannon Casey	1 episode	
2010	Rush	Elizabeth Heinz	1 episode	
2014	Wentworth	Katrina 'Trina' Jenkins	1 episode	
2015	Footballer Wants a Wife	Jade	5 episodes	
2017	Trip For Biscuits	Exalted Leader	1 episode	
2017	Sisters	Julia Bechly	7 episodes	
2018	Zero-Point	Amanda Jade/Hou Yi	4 episodes	
2018	Glitch	Sophie	1 episode	
2018	American Eggs	Revonika	2 episodes	
2018	How to Stay Married	Verity	1 episode	
2018	Get Krack!n	Rachel	1 episode	
2019	Mr. Black	Greta	1 episode	
2019	The InBESTigators	Miss Tan	18 episodes	
2019	My Life Is Murder	Cara Morgan	1 episode	
2020	Stateless	Angie Sanford	6 episodes	
2020	Retrograde	Isabel	6 episodes	
2021-25	The Newsreader	Cheryl Rici	16 episodes	
2021	New Gold Mountain	Annie Thomas	4 episodes	
2022	Discontent	Milly	3 episodes	
2023	The Clearing	Jenny	2 episodes	
2023–present	Strife	Christine	6 episodes	
2024	The Strange Chores	Gertrude / Brenda	2 episodes	
2025	Apple Cider Vinegar	Rebecca	3 episodes	
2025	The Family Next Door	Holly	6 episodes	

=== Web series/Video Games ===
Year	Title	Role	Notes
2015-2016	Movement	Writer/ Producer/ Actor (Sophia)	7 episodes
2017	Other People’s Problems	Actor (Florence)	5 episodes
2020	World of Warcraft: Shadowlands	Winter Queen	Video Game
2022	World of Warcraft: Dragonflight	Winter Queen	Video Game

== Theatre ==
Year	Title	Role	Notes
2006	Black Rock	Tiffany	Actor
2008	Shedding	Rosa	Actor
2012	Danny and the Deep Blue Sea	Roberta	Actor
2015-2016	Bad Jews	Daphna Feygenbam	Actor

== Awards and nominations ==
=== Screen writing ===
Year	Award	Category	Work	Result	Ref.
2016	Melbourne WebFest Award	Spotlight Award for Best Writing	Movement	Won	
