= Jessie Stephens =

Australian writer, television presenter, and podcast host

- Born: 1990
- Occupations: Author; Novelist; Editor; Television presenter; Podcast host

Jessie Stephens (born 21 December 1990) is an Australian writer, editor, novelist, television presenter and podcast host. She is an executive editor for Mamamia's flagship podcast Mamamia Out Loud and co-hosts the show with Mia Freedman and Holly Wainwright.

Stephens majored in Modern History and Gender Studies at the University of Sydney, and has a Master of Research.

She joined the staff of Mamamia as an editorial assistant in 2015.

Stephens has toured with her Mamamia Out Loud co-hosts as they present live shows in a similar format to the podcast to audiences around Australia. They toured in 2018 (Tamworth, Newcastle, Melbourne, Brisbane, Sydney, Dubbo), 2019 (Hobart, Brisbane, Perth, Darwin, Adelaide, Cairns, Orange, Geelong, Sydney), 2022 (Orange, Adelaide, Brisbane, Melbourne Sydney), and 2024 (Brisbane, Melbourne, Sydney).

Stephens is also a regular presenter on television current affairs and talk show The Project.

== Books ==
Stephens is the author of two books published by Pan Australia: the non-fiction book Heartsick: Three Stories About Love And Loss, And What Happens In Between (2021) and a novel, Something Bad is Going to Happen (2023).

Heartsick was received very favourably. It was voted #8 in Booktopia's Favourite Australian Book (FAB) award for 2021 and was included in the top 101 recommended books for 2022 by major Australian bookseller Dymocks. It was also shortlisted as general nonfiction book of the year at the Australian Book Industry Awards in 2022. It was published internationally by Pan Macmillan in the UK and by Henry Holt in the US. Reviewer Rebecca Wu in Glam Adelaide highlighted Stephens' "wonderful skill of interweaving seemingly ordinary occasions of life in a way that tells a story without any drudgery. In fact, she makes it enticing." Although Emily Paull's review in The AU Review was generally unfavourable, she acknowledged that "the ideas behind the book are strong, and that there is a need for more books which examine the not so happy endings in life, and don't hold romantic partnerships up to be the thing that completes us as humans."

The enthusiastic reception of the book in the US led Sue Smethurst in The Australian to call Stephens "our [Australian literature's] next big thing".

Something Bad is Going to Happen deals with themes of the mental health of its young protagonists. For this, it has been likened to "a modern-day Bell Jar", and Alexandra Hill in The Australian called it "a very important new release."

== Personal life ==
Stephens' identical twin sister, Clare Stephens, also works for Mamamia. In 2023, Jessie married Luca Lavigne, son of Mamamia founder Mia Freedman. The couple's first child, Luna, was born later that year.
