= Mia Freedman =

Australian journalist and editor

- Born: 1 October 1971 (age 55)
- Education: Vaucluse High School; Ascham School
- Occupations: Journalist; Editor; Television personality; Writer; Internet entrepreneur
- Spouse: Jason Lavigne (m. 1998)
- Children: 3
- Parents: Laurence Freedman AM (father); Kathy Freedman (mother)

Mia Freedman, also known as Mia Lavigne, (born 1 October 1971) is the co-founder of women’s digital media company Mamamia. She was the youngest editor of the Australian edition of Cosmopolitan in 1996, aged 24.

== Career ==
Freedman began her career at Cleo, doing work experience at the age of 19. Her first paid job in media was as Cleo's beauty editor and she stayed at Cleo for five years working her way up to the position of features editor. She left Cleo in 1995 and spent several months as a freelance features writer for magazines including Marie Claire, New Weekly and Who Weekly. In 1996, aged 24 years, she became editor of Australian Cosmopolitan magazine, the youngest editor of the magazine's 58 international editions.

Freedman is also the founder, publisher and editorial director of Australian women’s website Mamamia, where she retains a "hands-on" approach to editorial matters. In 2012, Freedman also launched an Australian edition of parenting website iVillage. This was rebranded as The Motherish in June 2015. All content for The Motherish was folded into Mamamia by November 2015.

Freedman has appeared regularly as a commentator on Today on the Nine Network and Ten's The Project. In 2009 Freedman was appointed Chair of the Australian Government's National Body Image Advisory Group by Minister for Sport and Youth, Kate Ellis.

Freedman has written four books, including Work Strife Balance, where Luca, her 19-year-old son, contributed a chapter describing his mother as having "no filter".

Freedman executive produced, with others, the comedic drama TV series Strife, which was inspired by Freedman’s memoir Work, Strife, Balance. The series Strife was written and adapted from Freedman's memoir by Australian screenwriter Sarah Scheller. The comedic drama tells the story of a modern, imperfect woman and publisher named Evelyn Jones, played by acclaimed Australian actress Asher Keddie, and her journey from lounge room blogger to becoming a force in women’s media. Strife is a Binge original series, released in December 2023.

== Personal life ==
Freedman is the only daughter of Laurence Freedman AM, a funds manager and chairman of The Freedman Foundation, and his wife, Kathy, a psychologist and art gallery owner. Freedman was raised Jewish and grew up in Sydney. She attended Ascham School.

In 1998, Freedman married Jason Lavigne, with whom she has three children. In 1999, Freedman had a miscarriage and spent two years in therapy, separated from Lavigne. In 2020, it was reported that Freedman and Lavigne purchased an A$12.75 million house in Point Piper.

In 2021, Freedman was diagnosed with attention deficit hyperactivity disorder (ADHD). Freedman disclosed this one year later, in September 2022, in a 2-part essay published on the website Mamamia and in an episode of the No Filter podcast. Previously, in 2015 Freedman disclosed in an interview that she has an anxiety disorder.

In 2023, Freedman's son Luca Lavigne married Mamamia executive editor Jessie Stephens. The couple's first child, Freedman's grand-daughter, Luna, was born later that year.

== Published works ==
- The new black. Pymble, NSW: HarperCollins. 2005. ISBN 0732281881.
- Mama Mia: a memoir of mistakes, magazines and motherhood. Pymble, NSW: HarperCollins. 2009. ISBN 9780732281892.
- Mia culpa. Camberwell, Victoria: Penguin Books. 2011. ISBN 9780670075515.
- Work strife balance. Sydney, NSW: Pan Macmillan. 2017. ISBN 9781925479935.
