= Cleo (magazine) =

Australian women's magazine

- Editor: Lucy E. Cousins
- Founding editor: Ita Buttrose
- Categories: Women's Lifestyle
- Frequency: Monthly
- Circulation: 53,221
- Total circulation: 173,000
- First issue: November 1972
- Final issue: March 2016
- Company: Bauer Media Group (until February 2016); Mercury Capital
- Country: Australia (published internationally)
- Website: www.cleo.com.au

Cleo was an Australian monthly women's magazine. The magazine was founded in 1972 in Australia; the Australia and New Zealand editions were discontinued in February 2016. Aimed at an older audience than the teenage-focused Australian magazine Dolly, Cleo was published by Bauer Media Group in Sydney and was known for its Cleo Bachelor of the Year award. In June 2020, Cleo was acquired by the Sydney investment firm Mercury Capital.

Cleo was founded by Ita Buttrose, and Kerry Packer (heir to Australian Consolidated Press). The magazine was modeled off of Cosmopolitan following ACP's loss of the bid for an Australian license.

The magazine was a monthly publication, published twelve times per year.

== Editors ==
Editor	Start year	End year	Ref.
Ita Buttrose	1972		
Lisa Wilkinson	1984		
Deborah Thomas	1997	1999	
Sarah Oakes	2008	2010	
Gemma Crisp	2010	2012	
Sharri Markson	2013	2013	
Lucy E. Cousins	2014	2016	

== History ==
=== Early years ===
Cleo launched in November 1972, under the direction of Ita Buttrose and Kerry Packer. The magazine was modelled off of the American women's magazine Cosmopolitan, following ACP's loss of the Australian licence to rival Fairfax Media.

Cleo became one of Australia's most iconic titles due to its mix of provocative content, including the first nude male centerfold with Jack Thompson as "Mate of the Month" (following American Cosmopolitan's nude centerfold of Burt Reynolds six months' earlier) and detailed sex advice. Article topics included group sex, contraception, "happy hookers" and sexually provocative tips such as "How to be a sexy housekeeper." Short-form literary content was also included, with the first issue running a short story by Norman Mailer.

In the original promotional video for Cleo, Buttrose observes "the rapidly changing personality of the Australian woman." Cleo emerged in an era of social and political change, with readers looking for something other than recipes, knitting tips and coverage of royal births and weddings that the main women's magazines (notablyThe Australian Women's Weekly) focused on.

In two days, 105,000 copies of the first issue were sold and by the end of its first year circulation reached 200,000. When the magazine conducted the first national readership survey in 1974, figures revealed that 30 percent of Australian women aged between 13 and 24 read Cleo every month.

=== Cleo, feminism, and the sexual revolution ===
==== Feminism ====
Through Cleo, feminism became a part of women's everyday lives and of their identity.

Ita Buttrose and her staff were committed to many of the ideas of women's and sexual liberation. However, Cleo's editorial agenda was that of liberal rather than radical feminism. In her first editorial letter, Buttrose described who she thought the Cleo reader was: "You're an intelligent woman who's interested in everything that's going on, the type of person who wants a great deal more out of life. Like us, certain aspects of Women's Lib appeal to you but you're not aggressive about it." (1972).

The feminist tone and ideas proliferated on the pages of Cleo throughout the 1970s. Every month, there were feature articles covering issues including: the work/life balance, the pressure to get married and raise a family, abortion, contraception, women's education, domestic violence and rape. "The celebrities Cleo chose to interview were women who had succeeded in politics, business and culture. There were also discussions of the Women's Liberation Movement itself, with writers for and against".

Ordinary, every-day women gained knowledge and understanding of feminism through the pages of Cleo. The magazine helped create the feminist public sphere, opening doors for discussions about new ideas which modern women treat as mainstream today.

==== Sexual revolution ====
Cleo pushed boundaries in mainstream publishing with candid articles on topics ranging from sex toys, fantasies and orgasms, to lesbianism and contraception. "We wrote about sex as if we had discovered it", recalls Buttrose.

Cleo was the first Australian women's magazine to feature non-frontal nude male centrefolds in 1972, with Jack Thompson, a prominent Australian actor at the time, the magazine's first Mate of the Month. What Buttrose thought would be a light hearted, one-off feature became an essential component of what made Cleo so popular. Other mates were Alby Mangels, Eric Oldfield, Peter Blasina and the band Skyhooks. The centrefold feature was discontinued in 1985, the last being a bare-chested picture of Mel Gibson.

University of Sydney media academic Megan Le Masurier interprets the centerfold phenomenon as an incentive for popular feminist desire. The centerfold attempted to reverse the dominant tradition of representing men as viewers, and women as viewed. The representation of the male nude "offered women the chance to imagine themselves as active sexual agents, quite capable of holding the gaze". The naked man was a reminder that women could, and should, enjoy sex, and reaffirmed their right to talk about sex.

=== Under Bauer Media and closure ===
In October 2012, multinational publisher Bauer Media purchased Australian magazine publisher ACP, which controls titles ranging from Cleo magazine to The Australian Women's Weekly This change of ownership meant drastic changes for the staff and readers of Cleo magazine.

The editorial staff of Cleo and Dolly would be merged, reducing the staff size by half and appointing a single Editor-in-Chief for both magazines. This was presented as a move to unite the two magazines under a "young women's lifestyles division". Observers argue that these two magazines are in fact not directed at the same generalised market. Where Dolly targets teenage girls, Cleo focuses on an older group, women in their twenties and thirties. Bauer Media also now uses "content translated from Bauer's youth titles Joy and Bravo which the publishing house produce in Germany", reducing the amount of original Australian content across the magazines, but reducing the cost of producing issues across their titles.

In 2013, new editor Sharri Markson announced there would be no mention of sex on the cover of Cleo. More than 40 years after revamping women's magazines with male centrefolds, it was the first time that sex had not been used as a selling point. The move came as a result of research conducted by the magazine which revealed a conservative streak among Generation Y readers – Cleo's largest audience demographic – most of whom still live at home. As Markson explained: "They are embarrassed to be sitting at home with their parents reading a magazine which has the word 'orgasm' in bold print on the cover". In the pages of Cleo, all the racy content of the earlier, more progressive era was replaced with celebrity news and fashion, beauty and fitness tips.

Cleo Fitness launched in 2014, later ceasing publication.

In 2014, Lucy Cousins was appointed Editor-in-Chief of Bauer's newly merged Dolly and Cleo magazines. Cousins was previously employed as Deputy Editor at Bauer's Women's Fitness magazine.

Cousins said of Cleo magazine:

"CLEO magazine is and has always been a bible of all things fashion, beauty and celebrity for young Australian women. And now we've added travel, lifestyle, music and the new CLEO man section. We have attitude and aren't afraid to push the boundaries."

==== Past editors' opinions on Bauer's changes ====
Mia Freedman: "Like most Australian women, Dolly and Cleo in particular were my lifeblood growing up and sparked my love of women's media back in the 80s and 90s. [I'm] frustrated and disappointed at the lack of business foresight that has brought those titles to this point. One of the reasons I left magazines was because I was so tired of trying to get my bosses to understand that Armageddon was coming in the form of online. I knew the young women's market was the most vulnerable. But nobody would listen so I left and started Mamamia...Publishers didn't realise they were content producers, they kept acting like magazine makers"

Lisa Wilkinson on Twitter: "Very sad to hear news that Dolly & Cleo magazines are merging, with expected losses of half the staff. End of an era. And a personal one." Wilkinson believes that it will take "somebody who is an incredibly smart magazine editor and someone who understands the subtle but very important differences that are going to have to exist between those two magazines" to ensure the survival of both Dolly and Cleo magazines.

==== Readership figures 2013–14 ====
It appears that Bauer's changes did not improve the continuing drop in circulation of Cleo magazine. Cleo suffered a steady decline in circulation due to changes in the way media was consumed and the failure of publishers in the 1990s and 2000s (decade) to follow their readers online. Statistics showed Cleo suffered a 28.2% drop between September 2013 and September 2014, with a readership size of 173,000 in September 2014.

Bauer Media however argued that it experienced a 100% increase in "social media growth" in that time period, suggesting that indeed the reason why readership figures fell was due to the movement from print media to the online world of blogs, forums and Facebook. They also stated that the best that Bauer Media could do to ensure the continuation of Australian magazines like Cleo was to minimise its production costs and hope that it can catch up with digital media.

==== Closure and IP acquisition ====
On 20 January 2016, Bauer Media Group confirmed that Cleo magazine would close in Australia after more than 40 years of publication, with the final issue being March, on sale 22 February. Cleo magazine's final cover, for the March edition, would feature Jesinta Campbell.

The international editions in Indonesia, Malaysia, Singapore, and Thailand were unaffected by the closure. The Indonesian edition ceased publication in 2017, followed in 2020 by the closure of the Malaysian and Singaporean editions. The Thai edition is still operating, however, now digital only.

In June 2020, Cleo was acquired by the Sydney investment firm Mercury Capital as part of its acquisition of several of Bauer Media's former Australian and New Zealand titles.

== International editions ==
Cleo Singapore was launched in 1994, Cleo Malaysia in 1995, Cleo Thailand launched in 1997, and Cleo Indonesia was launched in 2007 as an international license under the Femina Group. A South African edition was also briefly published from 2007.

- Cleo Singapore (1994–2020)
- Cleo Malaysia (1995–2020)
- Cleo New Zealand (1995–2016)
- Cleo Thailand (1997–present)
- Cleo Indonesia (2007–2017)
- Cleo South Africa (2007–?)

== Noteworthy editors ==
=== Ita Buttrose ===
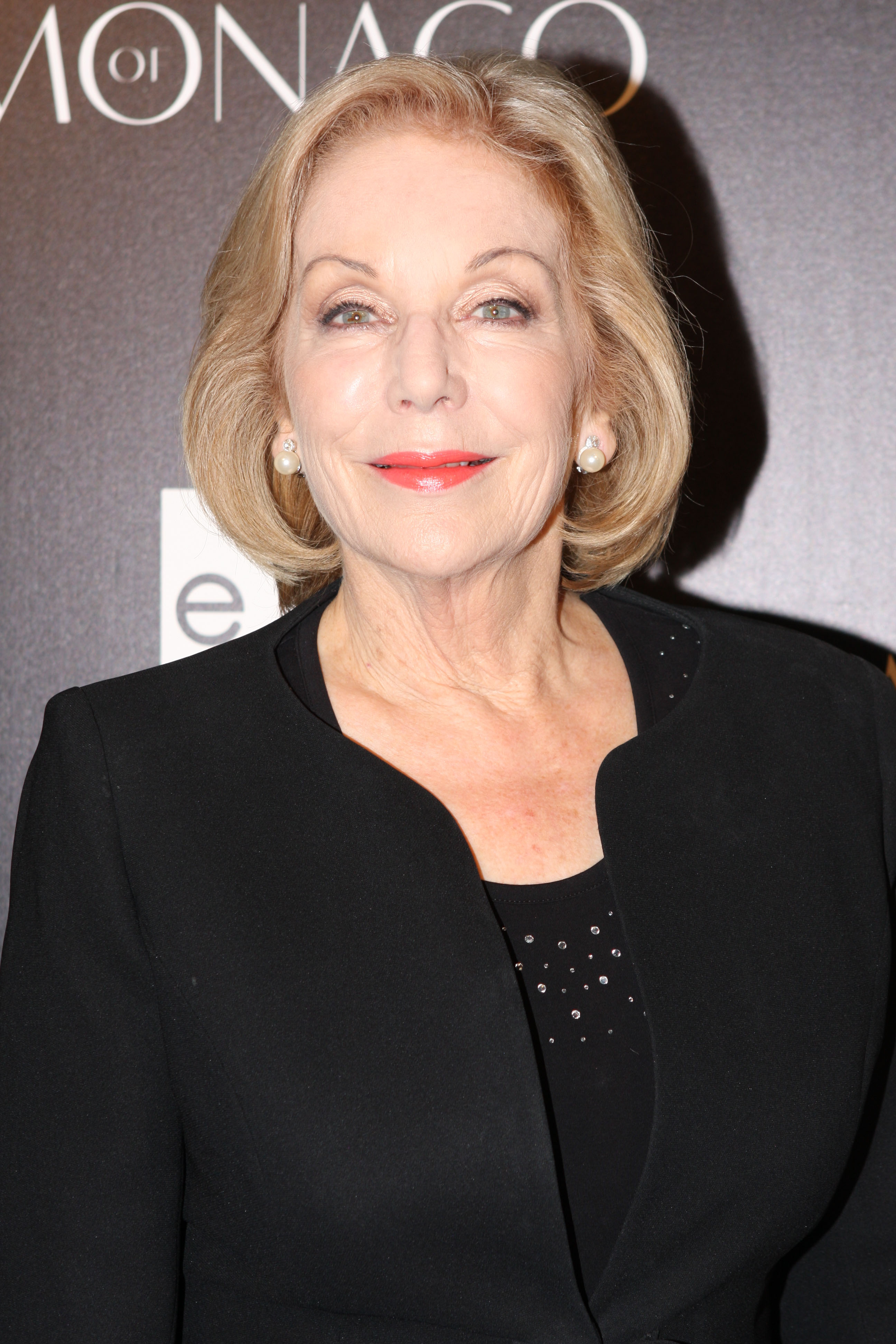
Ita Buttrose

Ita Buttrose started as a copy girl at the Australian Women's Weekly, she quickly became a cadet journalist at The Daily Telegraph and its sister newspaper Sunday Telegraph before taking over as women's editor at the age of 23. Buttrose would go on to become the first female Editor-in-Chief of these two newspapers and the first woman appointed to the board position with News Limited.

Her arguably most well known role began in 1972, as the founding editor of Cleo magazine where she achieved such great success that it led to a promotion in 1975, editing the Packers' flagship magazine at the time, the Australian Women's Weekly. She subsequently became editor-in-chief of both publications.

Buttrose played an important role in shaping women's identity in the 1970s through the pages of Cleo. She had the talent and conviction to take advantage of this period of social and political change, with new ideas about sexual freedom, female independence and gender equality heavily promoted in her magazine.

Despite scepticism from Sir Frank Packer, the Publisher, Buttrose's hunch that Cleo would appeal to modern Australian women proved to be right, with the magazine becoming the top selling monthly women's title and elevating Buttrose to the status of a feminist icon and magazine queen.

Andrew Cowell, the art director on the debut edition of Cleo said: "Ita's always had a talent to tap into a real need. She's always been a forward thinker, which keeps her ahead of the curve and able to make instinctive decisions. If Ita had a gut feeling for something, you were best to go with it."

Since 2011, Buttrose has been National President of Alzheimer's Australia and is also vice-president of Arthritis Australia. In 2013, she was named Australian of the Year. Buttrose uses her high-profile to champion social issues such as women's education and raise awareness of breast cancer and HIV/AIDS.

=== Lisa Wilkinson ===
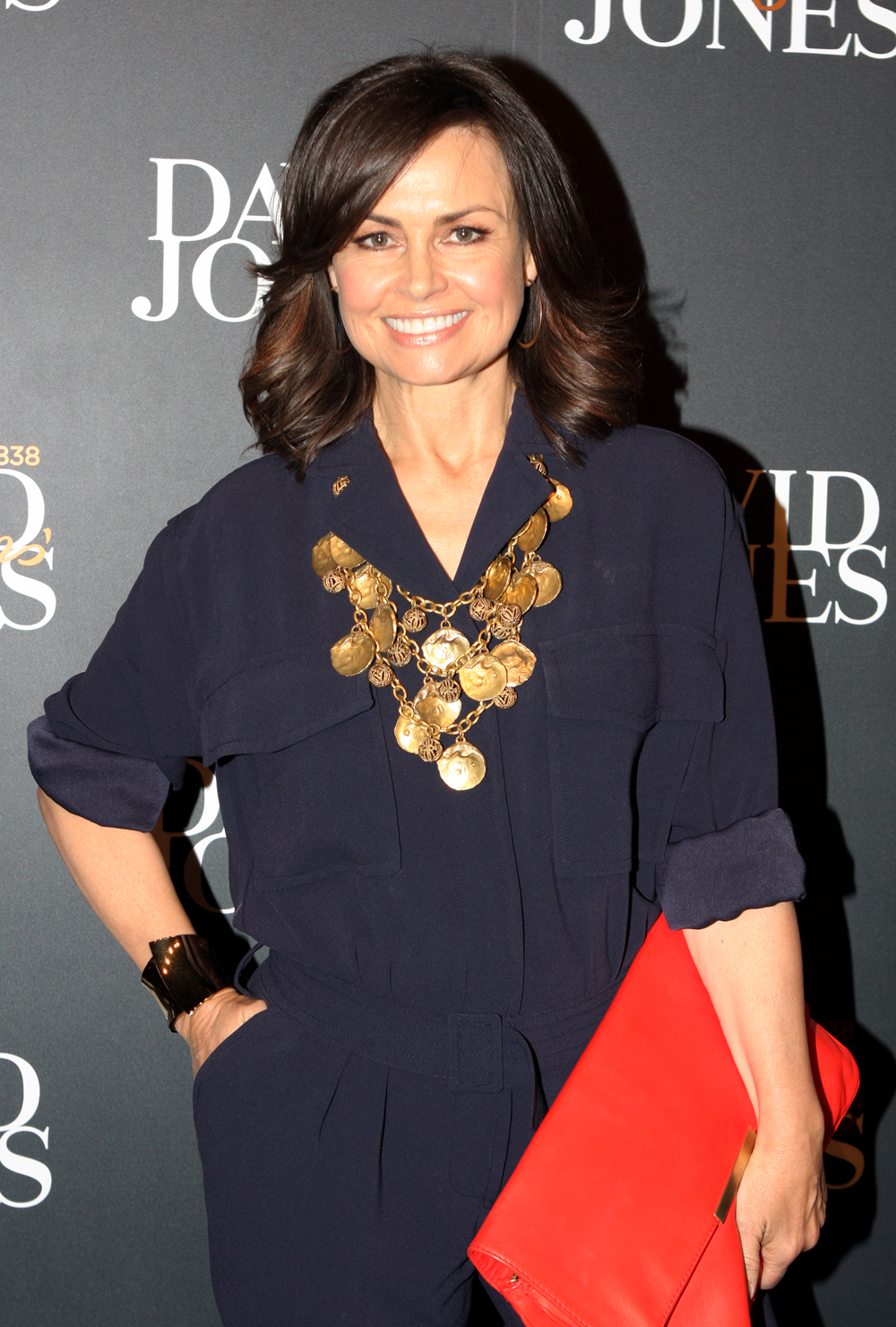
Lisa Wilkinson

Lisa Wilkinson's career in magazine publishing started at age 19 with no university education, as the enthusiastic secretary/editorial assistant/Girl Friday at Dolly magazine. After rising to the editorship of Dolly in only 5 years, Wilkinson took over the position of Cleo magazine editor in 1984, and reigned there for ten years. Later she became Cleo's International Editor-in-Chief, running editions in New Zealand, Singapore, Malaysia and Thailand. Under Wilkinson, Cleo magazine became the highest selling women's magazine per capita in the world.

A significant change made by Wilkinson at Cleo was the replacement of the Cleo centerfold with the Bachelor of the Year competition in 1985. Cleo magazine presents an annual round up of the 50 most eligible bachelors in Australia, and encourages readers to vote for their favourite eligible bachelor.

Wilkinson also mentored numerous women in Australian media today. Nicole Kidman, Miranda Kerr, Deborah Thomas, Paula Joye, and Mia Freedman all credit her as a long-time supporter.

After her career as a magazine editor, Wilkinson established her own media consultancy business and hosted breakfast talk show Today on the Nine Network, with Karl Stefanovic, before joining A Current Affair's program The Project on Network Ten.

=== Deborah Thomas ===
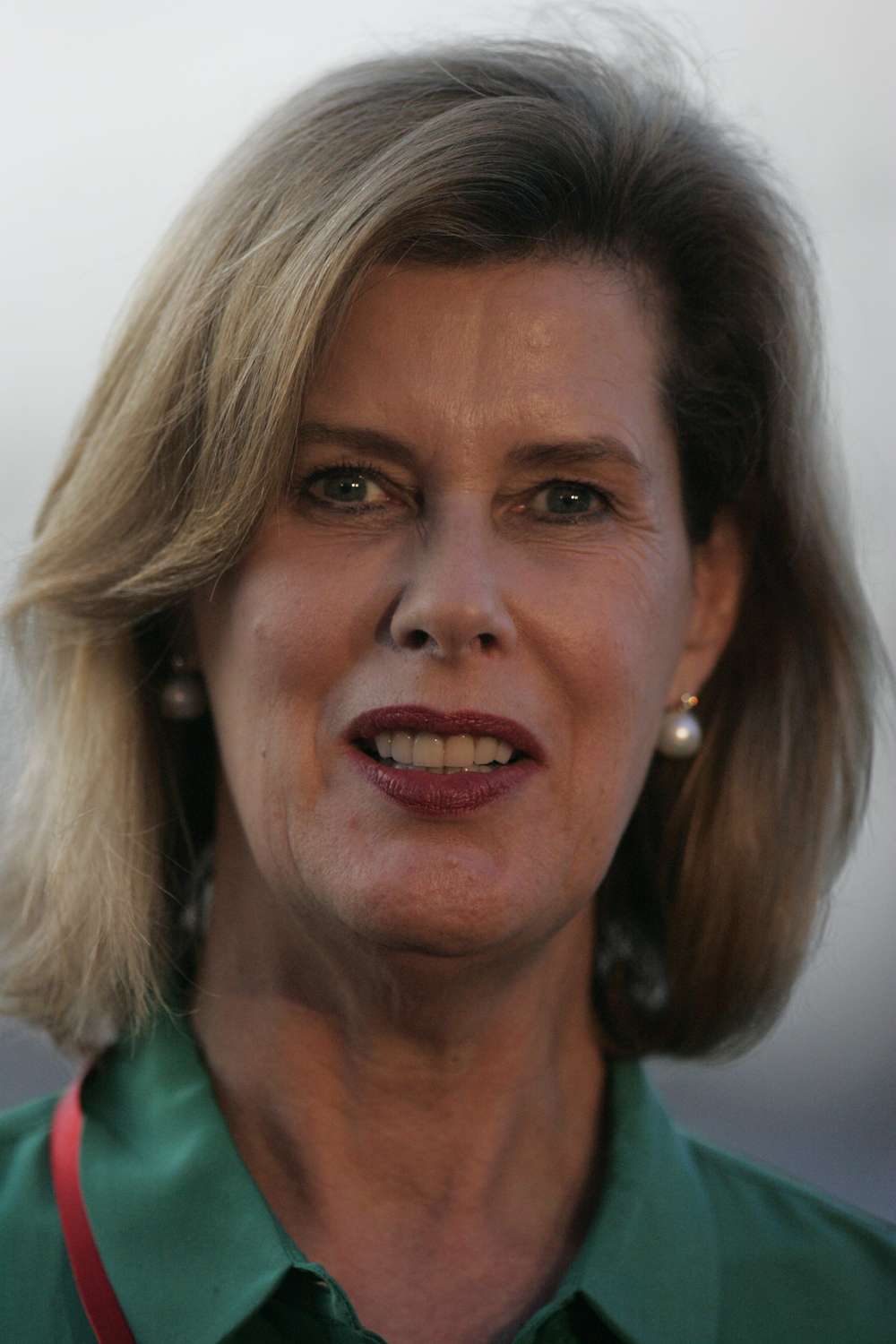
Thomas in January 2013

Deborah Thomas' career in magazine publishing started at Cleo magazine as Beauty and Lifestyle editor in 1987. She became deputy editor at Cleo in 1990, and was editor at Mode (now Harper's Bazaar) and Elle magazines until she took over the Editorship at Cleo from 1997 to 1999 where she "revive[d] the magazine's falling circulation and advertising revenue".

After Cleo magazine, Thomas became Editor-in-Chief of The Australian Women's Weekly and was awarded Editor of the Year in 2002 for her efforts at the iconic magazine. Later, Thomas was Director of Media, Public Affairs and Brand Development across Bauer Media's portfolio of 70-plus titles. In April 2015 she was appointed as CEO (chief executive officer) of Ardent Leisure.

=== Mia Freedman ===
Mia Freedman's first foray into magazine publishing was also at Cleo – doing work experience under then-editor Lisa Wilkinson. Freedman became the youngest ever editor of Cosmopolitan magazine at age 24, and at 32 became Editor-in-Chief of Dolly, Cleo and Cosmo. Freedman moved away from magazine publishing in 2007 and is now the publisher and editor behind popular women's interest website Mamamia, while continuing to write articles and books across numerous publications.

=== Sarah Oakes ===
Sarah Oakes is an experienced editor who has worked on a number of Australian publications such as K-Zone and Girlfriend and received many accolades throughout her career. She was the youngest ever recipient of the Magazine Publishers' Awards, Editor of the Year Award in 2005. Oakes was the editor-in-chief of Cleo between 2008 and 2010, where she repositioned the title and had great success with the Cleo 'Bachelor of the Year' campaigns. While at Cleo, Oakes was also a finalist in the Good Editor Awards. Oakes currently holds the position of editor of Sunday Life, a Fairfax publication that has a readership of more than 1.6 million.

==== Oakes' innovative changes for Cleo ====
===== New editorial line-up =====
Oakes presided over the relaunch and repositioning of Cleo in October 2009. She signed a veteran magazine editor and fashion stylist Aileen Marr as the new Fashion Director and Pip Edwards as Contributing Fashion Editor. The October issue in 2008 then started to feature more fashion pages up front, introduce new sections, and launch more beauty pages, including a market-first beauty panel.

===== "Models only" policy overturned =====
Oakes also brought celebrities back to the Cleo cover instead of "models only" policy introduced in the late 2007.

===== New "honesty policy" =====
Introduced in the August 2008 issue, this policy was designed to appeal to Generation Y, with readers invited to critique each issue in return for prizes such as iPhones and designer bags. As then editor Oakes explained, "Every month we will ask our readers online to give feedback (which will be) incorporated into the magazine the following month. We are doing all the things that motivate Generation Y: instant gratification and personalisation."

===== Sales trend =====
Cleo experienced an Average Net Paid Sales (ANPS) decline from 149,256 in 2008 to 134,286 in 2009, with a rate dropped by −10.03% and the number of copies sold decreased by 14,970-year-on-year. Meanwhile, the cover price of Cleo increased by $0.2 from $7.00 in 2008 to $7.20 in 2009. The circulation of Cleo decreased from 128,183 in 2009 to 110,081 in 2010.

== In popular culture ==
ABC mini-series, Paper Giants: The Birth of Cleo dramatises the emergence of the magazine. Screened over two nights in April 2011, the series was a ratings winner, with an average of 1.34 million viewers tuning in on the opening night to watch Ita Buttrose (played by Asher Keddie) navigate the male dominated world of Australian publishing in the 1970s as she fights to get Cleo off the ground. For many avid readers of Cleo, the idea that the magazine almost did not exist made for exciting television.

Most critics praised Asher Keddie's convincing portrayal of Buttrose as an ambitious leader and supportive mentor. According to producer John Edwards, Buttrose was a significant contributor to the script. "When I went to meet her, she was tentative, nervous and fearful but also flattered".

=== Feminist representational techniques ===
Academic Margaret Henderson argues that just as Cleo made feminist ideas popular, Paper Giants uses "feminist representational techniques" to make the 1970s era of social and political change accessible to modern audiences. For many avid readers of Cleo, the idea that the magazine almost did not exist made for exciting television.

A feminist approach to relationships is shown through the many scenes of the staff gathered around the table brainstorming. The impression given is that the evolution of editorial ideas is very much a collective work process, and the women's relationship to each other is supportive rather than competitive.

The typical Cleo reader is represented by Ita's shy assistant, Leslie (played by Jessica Tovey) who begins the series faking orgasms and running errands, and by the end, escapes her dead-end relationship to begin working as a journalist in London.

Women's sexual liberation is presented through humour, banter, and double entendres among the female characters. The staff use humour in their interactions while dealing with resistance from the magazine's male executives over the sexual content of Cleo. In one scene, the female staff discuss the magazine's sexual content with Kerry Packer (played by Rob Carlton) and Sir Frank, whose reactions contrast with the women's more open discussion of the subject.

"Paper Giants' recruitment of humour…is an important corrective to the cliché of humourless feminists and to po-faced and hubristic accounts of radical political movements".

== Cleo Bachelor of the Year winners ==
- 2017 - Marcus Courts 21
- 2016 – Jaryd Robertson, 25
- 2015 – Matthew Buntine, 22
- 2014 – Thien Nguyen
- 2013 – Trent Maxwell, 23
- 2012 – Hayden Quinn, 26
- 2011 – Eamon Sullivan, 25
- 2010 – Firass Dirani, 26
- 2009 – Axle Whitehead, 28
- 2008 – Jason Dundas, 25
- 2006 – Andy Lee, 25
- 2005 – Ryan Phelan, 29
- 2004 – Andrew G, 30
- 2003 – Geoff Huegill, 24
- 2002 – Paul Khoury, 28
- 2001 – David Whitehill, 26
- 2000 – Craig Wing, 21
- 1999 – Anthony Field, 35
- 1998 – Kyle Vander Kuyp, 27
- 1997 – Kyle Sandilands, 26
- 1996 – Eric Bana, 28
- 1994 – Aaron Pedersen, 24
- 1993 – Grahame Smith, 36

== Cleo New Zealand Bachelor of the Year winners ==
- 2012 – John Templeton
- 2011 – Nick Oswald
- 2010 – Philipp Spahn
- 2009 – please expand
- 2008 – please expand
- 2007 – Brad Werner
- 1993 – Matthew Rodwell

== See also ==
- List of men's magazines
- List of women's magazines
- Paper Giants: The Birth of Cleo
