= Emma Freeman =

Australian television director

- Education: Victorian College of the Arts
- Occupations: Television and film director
- Years active: 2002–present
- Known for: The Newsreader
- Awards: Tropfest, 2002; AACTA Award for Best Direction in Television, 2010; AACTA Award for Best Direction in a Drama or Comedy, 2021

Emma Freeman is an Australian director of television films and series. With her short film Lamb, in 2002 she was the first woman to win Tropfest. She has since directed many TV series, including Glitch, The Newsreader (2021–2025), and The Family Next Door (2025).

== Early life and education ==
Emma Freeman graduated from the Victorian College of the Arts.

== Career ==
Early in her career Freeman worked with producer John Edwards. In 2002 she wrote, produced and directed a seven-minute film, Lamb, starring Robert Menzies and Orpheus Pledger. Lamb won Sydney's Tropfest that year, with Freeman being the first woman director to win.

In 2003 she directed Mittens for Tinderbox Films. Starring Sigrid Thornton, the film was shown at the 2003 Palm Springs International Festival of Short Films and the 2004 London Australian Film Festival.

== Awards ==
In 2002 Freeman was the first woman to win Tropfest, with her short film Lamb.

In 2010 she won an AACTA Award for Best Direction in Television for Hawke.

Freeman won the AACTA Award for Best Direction in a Drama or Comedy in 2021 for episode 1 of The Newsreader and again in 2024 for episode 4 of The Newsreader.

== Selected filmography ==
Year	Title	Episodes	Notes	References
2002	Lamb		Short film	
2003	Mittens		Short film	
2005	Last Man Standing	3	Drama series (Seven Network)	
2007	Love My Way	3	Drama series (Showtime)	
2010	Hawke		Telemovie (Network Ten)	
2011–2016	Offspring	18	Comedy/drama series (Network Ten)	
2012	Miss Fisher's Murder Mysteries	2	Drama series (ABC)	
2012–2014	Puberty Blues	6	Comedy/drama series (Network Ten)	
2014	Party Tricks	3	Political drama/comedy series (Network 10)	
2015–2019	Glitch	15	Science fiction series (ABC)	
2016	Secret City	6	Political thriller series (Fox Showcase)	
2020	Stateless	3	Drama series (ABC)	
2021–2025	The Newsreader	18	Drama series (ABC)	
2021	Clickbait	2	Drama series (Netflix)	
2021	Love Me	6	Drama series (Binge)	
2024	Interview with the Vampire	2	Drama series (AMC+); S2, eps 6 & 7	
2025	The Family Next Door	6	Drama series (ABC)	
