= List of Australian films of 2017 =

This is a list of Australian films scheduled for release in 2017.

== 2017 ==
Title	Director	Cast (subject of documentary)	Genre	Notes	Release date
1%	Stephen McCallum	Abbey Lee, Matt Nable, Ryan Corr	Crime		9 September 2017
2:22	Paul Currie	Michiel Huisman, Teresa Palmer, Sam Reid	Thriller		June 30, 2017
Ali's Wedding	Jeffrey Walker	Osamah Sami, Don Hany, Helana Sawires	Drama		31 August 2017
Andorra	Fred Schepisi	Gillian Anderson, Essie Davis, Toni Collette, Guy Pearce	Drama	Based on the novel of the same name by Peter Cameron	2018?
Australia Day	Kriv Stenders	Bryan Brown, Isabelle Cornish, Burgess Abernethy	Drama		12 June 2017
Bad Blood	David Pulbrook	Morgan Griffin, Xavier Samuel	Thriller		8 October 2017
Bad Girl	Fin Edquist	Samara Weaving, Felicity Price, Benjamin Winspear	Thriller		27 April 2017
Berlin Syndrome	Cate Shortland	Teresa Palmer, Max Riemelt, Matthias Habich	Thriller	Based on the novel Berlin Syndrome by Melanie Joosten	20 April 2017
Breath	Simon Baker	Elizabeth Debicki, Simon Baker, Richard Roxburgh	Drama	Based on the novel Breath by Tim Winton	10 September 2017
The Butterfly Tree	Priscilla Cameron	Melissa George, Ewen Leslie, Ed Oxenbould, Sophie Lowe	Drama		11 August 2017
Cargo	Ben Howling, Yolanda Ramke	Martin Freeman, Anthony Hayes, Caren Pistorius	Thriller	Remake of the 2013 short film Cargo	6 October 2017
Dance Academy: The Movie	Jeffrey Walker	Xenia Goodwin, Alicia Banit, Dena Kaplan, Thomas Lacey, Keiynan Lonsdale, Jordan Rodrigues, Nic Westaway, Tara Morice, Miranda Otto	Drama	Based on the television series	6 April 2017
Don't Tell	Tori Garrett	Jack Thompson, Rachel Griffiths, Aden Young, Sara West	Drama		18 May 2017
Fags in the Fast Lane	Josh Collins, Sinbad Collins	Chris Asimos, Kitten Natividad	Action, adventure, comedy		1 April 2017
A Few Less Men	Mark Lamprell	Xavier Samuel, Kris Marshall, Dacre Montgomery	Comedy	Sequel to A Few Best Men	9 March 2017
The Gateway	John V. Soto	Jacqueline McKenzie, Myles Pollard, Hayley McElhinney	Sci-fi		1 March 2018
Hotel Coolgardie	Pete Gleeson		Documentary		10 June 2017
Hotel Mumbai	Anthony Maras	Armie Hammer, Dev Patel, Jason Isaacs	Thriller	Based on the 2008 Mumbai terrorist attacks	2018
Hounds of Love	Ben Young	Emma Booth, Ashleigh Cummings, Stephen Curry	Crime		1 June 2017
Jasper Jones	Rachel Perkins	Hugo Weaving, Toni Collette	Drama, mystery	Based on the novel Jasper Jones by Craig Silvey	2 March
Jungle	Greg McLean	Daniel Radcliffe, Alex Russell	Adventure		28 September 2017
Killing Ground	Damien Power	Aaron Pedersen, Harriet Dyer, Maya Stange, Tiarnie Coupland	Thriller		31 August 2017
Mondo Yakuza	Addison Heath	Kenji Shimada, Skye Medusa, Glenn Maynard, Cris Cochrane, Rob Stanfield	Action		16 January 2017
The Osiris Child: Science Fiction Volume One	Shane Abbess	Kellan Lutz, Daniel MacPherson, Isabel Lucas	Sci-fi		18 May 2017
OtherLife	Ben C. Lucas	Thomas Cocquerel, Jessica De Gouw, Shalom Brune-Franklin	Sci-fi		16 June 2017
A Silent Agreement	Davo Hardy	Davo Hardy, Paul Mercurio, Joshua Sealy	Drama		28 September 2017
Sweet Country	Warwick Thornton	Sam Neill, Bryan Brown, Thomas M. Wright, Matt Day	Western		6 September 2017
Swinging Safari	Stephan Elliott	Guy Pearce, Radha Mitchell, Julian McMahon, Kylie Minogue	Drama		18 January 2018
Tarnation	Daniel Armstrong	Daisy Masterman, Jasy Holt, Sean McIntyre	Horror		4 July 2017
That's Not Me	Gregory Erdstein	Alice Foulcher, Isabel Lucas, Richard Davies	Comedy		7 September 2017
Three Summers	Ben Elton	Robert Sheehan, Rebecca Breeds, Jacqueline McKenzie	Comedy		2 November 2017

== See also ==
- 2017 in Australia
- 2017 in Australian television
- List of 2017 box office number-one films in Australia
