= List of Dance Academy episodes =

Dance Academy is an Australian children's television drama. The show aired on ABC1 and ABC3 in Australia, and on ZDF in Germany. Series one premiered in Australia on 31 May 2010, the second series began on 12 March 2012, and series three began on 8 July 2013.

== Series overview ==
Series	Episodes	Originally released	
Series	Episodes	First released	Last released
1	26	31 May 2010	5 July 2010
2	26	12 March 2012	24 April 2012
3	13	8 July 2013	30 September 2013

== Episode list ==
=== Series 1 (2010) ===
Dance Academy features Tara Webster (Xenia Goodwin), a new student at Australia's National Academy of Dance. The show presents the students at the Academy learning the intricacies of ballet and dance, and is primarily shown from Tara's perspective, along with fellow first year students Kat Karamakov (Alicia Banit), Abigail Armstrong (Dena Kaplan), Sammy Lieberman (Tom Green), Christian Reed (Jordan Rodrigues), and third year student Ethan Karamakov (Tim Pocock).

No. overall	No. in series	Title	Written by	Original release date	Australian viewers
1	1	"Learning to Fly, Part 1"	Samantha Strauss	31 May 2010	95,000
Tara Webster, a 15-year-old from a farm in the Outback, travels to Sydney to audition for a spot at the National Academy of Dance, considered the best dance school in Australia.
2	2	"Week Zero"	Samantha Strauss	1 June 2010	N/A
Tara arrives at the Academy and finds out that she is considered the worst dancer there. For Tara, making friends and earning the respect of her teachers is a challenge. She also deals with being homesick.
3	3	"Behind Barres"	Sam Carroll	2 June 2010	101,000
Tara has a crush on Ethan which threatens Tara's friendship with Kat. To determine which is more important, with Sammy's help, Tara makes a list of pros and cons about Ethan. However, Abigail emails Tara's list to the whole school. Christian is accepted into the Academy on scholarship by the director's agreement, saving Christian from juvenile detention while awaiting trial.
4	4	"Minefield"	David Ogilvy	3 June 2010	N/A
Kat feels betrayed by Tara's crush on Ethan. For a class assignment, Sammy and Abigail have to tie themselves together for 24 hours which they later discover only had to be "2–4 hours". Tara and Christian have to ask each other questions for this same assignment where Christian tells her that his mother died.
5	5	"Real Men Don't Dance"	Michael Miller	4 June 2010	N/A
Tara is struggling to keep Ethan out of her thoughts. Sammy has to choose between compulsory Saturday ballet classes or his Synagogue services. Christian finds that he can not accept the rules of the Academy. Kat quickly tries to help him get over his "peoplephobic" behaviour after his confrontation with Academy teacher Patrick. Sammy's dad tries to pull him out of the Academy because his grades are dropping; however, he then sees Sammy dancing and decides against it even though he doesn't support him. Dr. Lieberman informs Sammy that until his grades improve he's grounded.
6	6	"Perfection"	Samantha Strauss	7 June 2010	131,000
Tara is surprised to discover Kat's mother is Natasha Willis, a world-acclaimed ballerina and Tara's idol. She agrees to teach the first years for a week. Tara goes to Swan Lake with Kat where Natasha performs and then Tara colours her hair like Natasha. Mia, Sammy's girlfriend, surprises him by showing up at the Academy from exchange. He is then torn between his long distance relationship with her and new-found feelings for Abigail. After Tara goes to see Natasha in her dressing room before another performance and Natasha makes her leave, she realises why Kat has been mad at her for thinking so highly of her mother.
7	7	"Crush Test Dummies"	Deborah Parsons	8 June 2010	97,000
Ethan requires a dancer for his hip-hop showcase and asks Christian on the basis of the favour he owes him; Christian agrees but opposes Ethan's choreography. Tara educates Kat in every aspect of the art form of crushes.
8	8	"Growing Pains"	Sarah Lambert	9 June 2010	98,000
Tara is tired of being the youngest and dislikes that Ethan thinks of her as just a little kid. When Tara is seen talking with Damien Lang, a rumour is quickly spread that they are dating. Abigail does not want to accept the changes in her developing body.
9	9	"Heartbeat"	Matt Ford	10 June 2010	N/A
Kat creates a video of her dancing to one of teen popstar Myles Kelly's songs and then posts it on the Internet. The video becomes very popular and she is contacted by his music company, which invites her to dance in his next music video. Christian and Ethan see each other as friendly rivals and become competitive.
10	10	"Through the Looking Glass"	David Hannam	11 June 2010	102,000
Christian's friend Aaron reveals the truth about the robbery they both committed. Abigail's control issues take control over her and she is seen stealing from a store.
11	11	"One Perfect Day"	Max Dann	14 June 2010	118,000
Tara is ecstatic when Ethan asks her to dance in his assessment piece. Kat, Sammy, Abigail and her little sister Paige go to an amusement park, however, Abigail fails to connect with Paige, who would rather be with Kat and Sammy.
12	12	"Pressure"	Samantha Strauss	15 June 2010	126,000
The students are under heavy pressure during exam week. Tara tries to forget about her recent kiss with Ethan so she can focus on her exams. Ethan attempts to kiss her again, but Tara flees. Abigail puts herself under a lot of pressure with the goal of scoring a scholarship. Sammy discovers she's been starving herself, but Abigail makes him promise not to say anything until the exams are over.
13	13	"Family"	Samantha Strauss	16 June 2010	119,000
Open Week at the Academy is when parents watch their children in demonstration classes. Tara is glad to see her mother and father again, but when they arrive she discovers the farm is in financial trouble. Sammy is disappointed when his father does not attend any classes and he worries his father will never accept that he would like to be a dancer.
14	14	"Turning Pointes"	Greg Waters	17 June 2010	114,000
Tara returns from the school holidays and is happy that she has great friends, a boyfriend and a scholarship, and she is finally allowed to dance en pointe. Kat convinces Tara to come to a warehouse party in Sydney. Tara and Christian become closer. Abigail cannot convince her therapist to let her return to ballet classes after her breakdown the previous semester.
15	15	"My Life En Pointe"	Sam Carroll	18 June 2010	107,000
An exchange student, Petra Hoffman, arrives from the Berlin Ballet School. Kat is enamoured with her new boyfriend and skips classes to be with him. Petra photographs Tara and Christian kissing, creating tension between them unbeknownst to Ethan.
16	16	"Free Falling"	Samantha Strauss	21 June 2010	121,000
Kat is upset when her parents forget her 16th birthday; with revenge in mind she has a party at their home. The party quickly fills with strangers joining in. Lucas tries to make a move while Kat is drunk. Kat kisses Christian and Ethan finds out about Tara and Christian's kiss after Abigail sends it to Kat's phone.
17	17	"A Midsummer's Night's Dream"	Samantha Strauss	22 June 2010	105,000
As school camp arrives, Tara is the outcast of the event after Kat's birthday party: Kat will not speak to her, and photos of Tara kissing Christian are showing up everywhere. After a flashback of what Tara's week has been like, Christian tells Tara he likes her at the camping site. Sammy is forced to tutor Abigail in English, but Abigail decides that she's not smart enough and copies her essay off the internet. Sammy tells Abigail she's "brilliant" and then kisses her.
18	18	"Betty Bunheads"	Alicia Walsh	23 June 2010	138,000
Petra Hoffman is excited when she is asked to stay at the Academy, however, the Berlin Ballet Company offers her a contract. She struggles with the decision to stay at the Academy or take the job. Abigail continues to cause trouble for Tara. Sammy and Abigail are now secretly dating and Sammy wants to go public, especially because Petra now likes him.
19	19	"Fairest and Best"	David Hannam	24 June 2010	159,000
The Institute of Sport has sent football players to the Academy for one week of training to improve their elevation, coordination and flexibility. However, tensions erupt between the players and male dancers. Meanwhile Sammy is growing impatient with Abigail hiding their relationship.
20	20	"Ballet Fever"	Ellie Beaumont	25 June 2010	188,000
The Academy board votes to remove hip-hop and jazz from Academy lessons, infuriating Kat, who attempts to get them reinstated. Tara starts to become jealous whenever Christian is around other girls. But spending time at the beach together playing beach cricket, Tara and Christian finally kiss. However, after running to class, Tara takes a fall, leaving Christian to carry her to the Academy to seek medical assistance. Sammy takes Tara's spot in a dance routine with Abigail.
21	21	"FOMO: Fear of Missing Out"	Samantha Strauss	28 June 2010	129,000
A month has passed since Tara's injury and her plaster is about to come off. However, her focus is on Christian, who is her new boyfriend. She also deals with planning the school formal. Sammy and Abigail decide to step up their relationship on the night of the school formal.
22	22	"Flight or Fight Response"	Liz Doran	29 June 2010	152,000
Christian's hearing for the robbery he and Aaron committed is coming up, however, Aaron has disappeared which puts a hole in Christian's defence. Tara has been training in rehab and is able to return to the Academy, but is frightened she will again injure herself. Ethan coaches Tara through her recovery, as they both struggle with overcoming their fears about what life has in store for them. Abigail tries to be friendly with Kat because she thinks it will help her relationship with Sammy, which has been going downhill lately. Sammy, having spent the day with Christian to provide moral support for his upcoming court hearing forgets about a date he had planned with Abigail, causing even more strain on their relationship and leading them to break up.
23	23	"BFF: Best Friends Forever"	Samantha Strauss	30 June 2010	139,000
Christian goes to his court hearing for the store robbery, and when Aaron returns, Christian decides to alter his story to protect him. Ethan is courted to be a choreographer at a dance company in Spain. Kat, (acting on advice given to her by Abigail) hatches a plan to get Tara and Ethan back together so that Ethan will have a reason to stay in Sydney and not abandon her like the rest of her family members. It is revealed that Kat and Abigail were once childhood best friends until they were 11 years old, when Kat decided that she was a rebel and abandoned Abigail for becoming too serious about ballet. With intervention from Sammy, Aaron decides to tell the truth in court and Christian is allowed to remain at the Academy. Kat's plan to reconcile Tara and Ethan fails but he is ultimately rejected by the company and remains in Sydney anyway.
24	24	"Heatwave"	David Hannam	1 July 2010	122,000
During the weeks that have passed since the court hearing, Sammy and Christian become good friends and have decided to forget about girls, becoming inseparable, but Christian begins to ignore Sammy so that he can spend more time with Tara instead. Sammy becomes jealous and starts to think he might have feelings for Christian. Ethan and Kat's father, Sebastian Karamakov, arrives to direct the Academy's end of year production, The Nutcracker, putting pressure on all the students to audition and compete for roles.
25	25	"The Deep End"	Greg Waters	2 July 2010	118,000
The Nutcracker rehearsals begin and Tara, cast as Clara, finds that being the star is more trouble than she expected. Sammy faces the fact that his feelings for Christian have shifted.
26	26	"Learning to Fly, Part 2"	Samantha Strauss	5 July 2010	168,000
The Academy's performance of The Nutcracker is quickly approaching, and Tara continues to practice for her dance solo in Act 2. However, Director Karamakov warns her that if she does not improve her performance, he will put Abigail in Tara's place. Tara's confidence increases when she discovers that her costume has been worn by many famous dancers in the past, but Abigail hides it to try and discourage her further. Kat leaves the Academy with Myles to road-trip around Australia, and Sammy tries to convince his father to continue letting him attend the Academy.

=== Series 2 (2012) ===
Dance Academy was announced as having been renewed for a second series of 26 episodes on 15 July 2010. Casting calls were issued on 14 September 2010, and filming took place between 31 January and 4 August 2011 in and around Sydney. The series premiered on ABC3 on 12 March 2012, and concluded on 24 April 2012. The series was again executive produced by Joanna Werner. Series two featured Tara and the other students' second year at the Academy, and their efforts to make it through to represent Australia at a major ballet competition, the Prix de Fonteyn.

No. overall	No. in series	Title	Written by	Original release date	Australian viewers
27	1	"In the Middle, Somewhat Elevated"	Samantha Strauss	12 March 2012	118,000
The second year of dance school starts, with Tara and Christian having spent the holidays together on her farm and ending up rekindling their romance; Kat and Miles break up, and Kat begins attending a normal girls' high school after not being accepted back for second year; Ethan acts cold towards Tara for not taking up his offer, instead offering Miss Raine's goddaughter and new student from London, Grace, her role; Sammy brushes off his feelings for Christian as a normal teenage questioning of sexuality, instead taking advantage of first-year girls’ eagerness to receive good accommodation (as he has been appointed boarding house adviser) by carrying on flings with them. Meanwhile, Abigail appears to have shrugged off her stubborn and competitive personality, however, after Sammy tells her the reason they did not get back together at the end of the last year, she reverts to her old self.
28	2	"Dreamlife"	Liz Doran	13 March 2012	N/A
Tara meets prestigious former student Saskia Duncan, who invites her to a performance of The Firebird, and tells her stories of her busy dancing career, which makes Tara doubt her future with Christian as well as his dedication to becoming a professional dancer; Saskia later falls during a performance and potentially ends her career. Kat tries to make friends with a group of girls at her new school, but is largely ignored. Sammy further struggles to find time to work at a restaurant to make money to support himself, while he and Christian spearhead an informal hip hop class since it was dropped from the official academy schedule, which becomes popular, although both are near-last and last (respectively) in classes. Abigail recruits two admiring first-year girls to dig up dirt on Grace, who has ranked first in every class after the first week. Grace eventually reveals the reason she left the Royal Ballet School in London was because she caused another girl to have a nervous breakdown and tells Abigail she "do[es]n't care about being the best".
29	3	"Faux Pas de Deux"	Greg Waters	14 March 2012	N/A
First-year student Ben Tickle is put in second-year classes because of his talent, but gets off on the wrong foot with the students, namely Sammy and Christian, for being judgemental (saying things are "gay") and a little self-absorbed, telling people to call him "Benster"; he initially throws a party for himself on Observatory Hill, but no one attends. Kat helps a group of girls for a high school assignment by making an expressionist music and movement routine, enlisting the help of her dance friends. Sammy decides that he has to work out his feelings, but tells Christian all is good between them. Grace and Abigail both make attempts to become better friends, initially struggling, but bond through Grace's idea to have fun by tricking people into giving them things for free (Abigail pretends to faint from low blood sugar while Grace calls for help and food; Abigail pretends to be Vanessa Hudgens to a new employee at a dress shop to get free clothes; and both pretend to be lost Swedish girls to a police officer to get a free ride back to the academy). The episode ends with Kat having made new friends, Sammy giving Ben a talking to about his personality and how his words could offend people, and Ben receiving a proper party with all the students attending.
30	4	"Legends"	Keith Thompson	15 March 2012	N/A
Saskia begins teaching repertoire classes at the academy, and Tara and Abigail compete to impress her. Saskia asks the class to work on their solo pieces, so everyone, especially Abigail (with Grace's help) begins looking to find a good routine to do; Tara has already chosen The Red Shoes, Saskia's solo when she represented Australia at the Prix de Fonteyn. Saskia then criticises Tara's performance during class, telling her it was "a mess" and later saying she doesn't have the experience, leaving Tara disheartened. Ethan convinces Abigail to dance for a piece he is composing, but still faces his father's harsh judgements, who tells him he isn't ready. Miss Raine discovers Sammy's job at the restaurant, and the two discuss his supporting himself. Sammy says he was hoping to get a scholarship the following semester, to which Miss Raine replies he will need a tutor.
31	5	"Showcase"	Keith Thompson	19 March 2012	N/A
Ethan changes his piece for Showcase after criticism from his father, adding extra dancers (including Grace), angering Abigail. Christian's street-smart friend Kaylah arrives at the academy, looking for help from Christian (who she calls "Cheds") for her Showcase routine, alienating Tara, who realises that she is in love with Christian and had been wanting to tell him so. Kat, who has also been told by her parents that her father wants to travel to Berlin to choreograph The Firebird with her mother as the principal dancer, alters Sammy and Ben's "steampunk" tap-dancing entry into a more modern three-person dance piece with herself as a burlesque ballerina being fought for by the two guys, and is offered an opportunity by a talent agent. Kaylah is overcome by last-minute nerves and Tara helps talk her into taking the stage, for which Christian is thankful and unknowingly alleviates her earlier uneasiness by telling her he loves her first. Abigail then closes the Showcase with Ethan's originally-intended solo performance for her to a new piece of music, "The Last Day on Earth".
32	6	"Like No One's Watching"	Emily Ballou	20 March 2012	N/A
Sammy's younger brother Ari unexpectedly turns up at the academy with a bruise on his face, but Sammy finds out in a call from their mother that he had a fight with a "mathlete" for taking his spot on his school's hockey team. Kat takes up the talent agent's offer, and accompanied by a keen Ben, attends a football cheerleading tryout before getting a callback. Tara begins having body issues, feeling like she's not attractive enough for Christian and accidentally fake tans herself to excess, but Christian eventually assures her she's fine as she is.
33	7	"A Choreographed Life"	Kirsty Fisher	21 March 2012	N/A
The second years are assigned a dance project. Ben invites Kat to join his and Sammy's flash mob to impress her. Tara finds a picture of Christian and his mother on his bulletin board and unfolds it to reveal Christian's father. Tara questions him about his father but Christian refuses to talk about it. Grace makes things awkward between Abigail and Ethan when she says they obviously are dating each other, making Abigail tense and amusing Ethan. Tara and Christian, criticised by Miss Raine for skipping class, make their dance project a duet but still join Ben and Sammy's flash mob. Grace and Abigail also participate in the flash mob with Ethan as the cameraman. Sammy informs Ben that their planned flash mob show on the ferry is not possible due to the workers being on strike; Ben then decides to hold it on the train. Afterwards, Grace makes it known to Ethan that she in fact likes him before kissing him in sight of Abigail. This crosses into Tara and Christian's argument over Tara researching his father's whereabouts. In anger, Christian breaks up with Tara.
34	8	"Connectivity"	Samantha Strauss	22 March 2012	N/A
Pas de deux exam time arrives, and Tara is partnered with Ben, Abigail with Christian and Sammy with Grace. Sammy is hyped with energy (and caffeine) and is still trying to juggle his work priorities with dancing, but in a mind slip, accidentally forgets to lock up at work and allows the cash to be stolen. Tara is still reeling from her break-up with Christian, and tries calling him to help her practice as Ben is unworried (and has BO); meanwhile, Tara takes her and Ben's concerns that Saskia has a grudge against her up with Miss Raine, who brushes her off, telling her she asked Saskia to be hard on Tara due to her recent lack of commitment to dancing. Christian is unresponsive to Tara's calls, and skips class the next day with Kat (who is struggling with her own exams, having skipped school) to entertain kids at a fairy-themed birthday party, leaving Abigail to do her routine with Sammy, who accidentally lets her fall, causing even more mayhem.
35	9	"The Break"	Josh Mapleston	26 March 2012	N/A
On the last day of semester, the boys (Sammy, Ben and Christian) and the girls (Tara, Abigail, Grace and Kat) all try to have fun without talking about the other, but fail as Christian grows closer to Kat and further away from Tara. The boys try to get into a club (Kat says to the girls that her agent gave her tickets to get in), but fail to and then visit a tattoo parlour, where Sammy insists he wants a tattoo. When Christian interferes, he, Sammy and Ben come to blows; all then visit the club after Christian and Kat exchange photos and texts (into which Grace had been prying)—the pair later kiss. Sammy, still in dire straits financially and having learned that he has failed all of his exams, says he will call his father for financial support. Christian and Tara finally discuss their uncertain break-up, and officially decide to take a break. Grace and Abigail's friendship turns sour when Abigail deduces that Grace has spent the day scheming and manipulating to drive a wedge in between Kat and Tara's friendship. She then reconciles with Ethan and asks him for help with choreographing her solo for the Prix de Fonteyn auditions.
36	10	"A Good Life"	Roger Monk and Samantha Strauss	27 March 2012	N/A
Sammy is looking to get Youth Allowance to support his dancing until he learns his Grandpa Morrie has died, so he returns home to his family (including his emotionally distant father) and then attends the funeral. Grace and Abigail fall out as friends, so Grace schemes to bring Tara on her side by breaking both hers and Tara's pointe shoes to make it look as if Abigail is against both of them and jealous. Abigail is later forced to apologise, however Tara still decides to move out of their shared room and into a room with Grace instead. Kat avoids Christian, and Tara and gets an audition, then an interview and finally accepted to be a part of the Moulin Rouge in Paris. It is also later revealed Sammy's father begins repaying his tuition fees.
37	11	"Self Sabotage"	Shanti Gudgeon	28 March 2012	96,000
Miss Raine introduces Sammy to his tutor—talented, opinionated and uninterested third-year Ollie. Ollie is initially unimpressed by Sammy, telling him to buy him food and not paying attention while Sammy tries to receive constructive criticism. However, after Sammy analyses him, Ollie decides to take Sammy on as a serious protégé. Grace convinces Tara to film her dancing for Saskia, also managing to capture Saskia harshly criticising Tara's performance, who tells her, "You're never going to make it." Grace later convinces Tara to upload it online, where it becomes a viral hit overnight, and comes to the attention of Miss Raine; Tara apologises to Saskia, but defies Saskia's past criticism of her Red Shoes performance by asking Miss Raine if she can perform it at the Prix de Fonteyn. Kat continues practicing for the Moulin Rouge, but arrives late and unprepared. Despite being told she is talented but just needs to work at it, she is let go.
38	12	"Breaking Pointe"	Samantha Strauss	29 March 2012	N/A
Kat asks Miss Raine if she can come back to the academy, and continues pestering her until she begrudgingly relents—but tells Kat that she must repeat first year as she failed; in the meantime, Ethan assigns Abigail to train Kat for readmission as payment for choreographing her solo. Kat also tells Christian that although she may have feelings for him, she knows that he's only pretending not to still have feelings for Tara, who is literally being pushed to the limit in practice by Saskia, who injures Tara's back by stretching her leg in exaggerated arabesque position to reprimand her. Tara seems to find comfort for her injury from Christian, but he says he won't be guilted into getting back together with her. Tara gets an MRI scan from a non-academy doctor, who tells her she has cracked a bone in her spine, and not to do any high-strain activities—like dancing.
39	13	"Backstab"	Samantha Strauss	2 April 2012	N/A
Prix de Fonteyn auditions begin, while Sammy re-takes his dancing exams and Kat dances for Miss Raine to get back into first year. Tara continues practicing despite her injury, and goes to see the non-academy doctor again as her friends become concerned. She eventually decides to tell Miss Raine with her dad present, who tells her she has no choice but to expel her because of her lying about not being injured and the academy's rules about other doctors. Tara also finds out that Kat and Christian kissed, and claims Kat backstabbed her. Saskia asks Abigail to audition with The Red Shoes, but Abigail sees that Saskia wants to use her to get back at Tara. Waiting backstage, Abigail kisses Ethan and then performs the solo he has choreographed for her. Kat is also accepted back into first year.
40	14	"Rescue Mission"	Samantha Strauss	3 April 2012	N/A
Tara is taken home by her father, who wants to get an opinion on her back injury from their family doctor. Tara's friends begin calling her, offering support—even Ethan and Abigail, and later, Christian. Kat tries to integrate herself with the first-year dance students, who see her as an outsider due to her past uncommitted attitude to dancing, but their idol Abigail tells them to accept her. Kat and Abigail's childhood friendship then shows signs of being rekindled and Kat moves into Abigail's room. Tara visits St. Vincent's Hospital, where Ben is coincidentally volunteering and helping children with leukemia put on a play involving space dog Laika called Space Rescue Mission Adventure. She soon discovers from a nurse that Ben was a patient in the past, and after the play finishes, asks Ben to back her up in telling the academy that Saskia caused her injury (as he was also present during the practice session), to which he agrees.
41	15	"Moving On"	David Hannam	4 April 2012	N/A
Ethan is offered the chance of choreographing a fringe musical, for which he recruits Abigail, who also practices singing for the role. Tara arrives back at the academy, having recovered enough to present her case against Saskia. Although Miss Raine offers Tara her position again, Tara refuses to accept it as Saskia is unrepentant and denies she did any wrong. After the second-year dancers become hostile and make sarcastic remarks to Saskia, she resigns and heads home to Perth. Despite still not apologising to a returning Tara, Saskia tells her she'll be jealous of new dancers one day too, but Tara says she will never do what Saskia did, because although she loves ballet, she won't let it destroy her. After a party on a yacht for him, Ethan is offered a job opportunity in Barcelona, and bids a tearful goodbye to everyone.
42	16	"Origins"	Melina Marchetta	5 April 2012	N/A
The second-year students are asked to perform a piece expressing what made them who they are—Tara's piece is influenced by a critical Grace, while everyone learns from Tara that Ben had leukemia, so he changes his initial performance (pretending to be a red blood cell) to an upbeat number to deflect the pity he says he became a dancer to get away from. Sammy travels to the Regional finals of the Prix de Fonteyn as he missed the preliminary round in the city, taking a road trip with Ollie and Christian, whose father, Raf, unbeknownst to the others, runs his own custom surfboard shop in the area. Sammy auditions and gets in with Ollie's help. Ollie is also revealed to be gay and admits to Sammy he likes him. Christian visits his father, and the two talk about Christian's mother. His dad later gives him a surfboard as well as his phone number. Arriving back at the Academy, Christian visits Kat and kisses her, and dances his second-year piece from the experience of meeting his father.
43	17	"Love and War"	Emily Ballou	9 April 2012	N/A
After the first-years flour bomb the second-years in the middle of the night, both years become competitive and schedule a hip hop dance-off. Sammy recruits Ollie's help, saying he is the best hip-hop dancer at the academy, while both years practice their moves and throw parties (the second-years’ party being quiet and relaxed compared to the first-years' upbeat dance party with glowsticks and a hot tub). Tara, whose attitude has been influenced by Grace, drunkenly confronts Christian and Kat at the party, and tries to kiss Ben, but ends up throwing up and being given advice by Miss Raine. Before the eventual showdown (at which the second-years win), Ollie and Sammy kiss.
44	18	"Catch Me If I Fall"	Alicia Walsh and Samantha Strauss	10 April 2012	N/A
Ballet teacher Zach wants to get all of the students re-enthused about dancing after the mid-semester break, so he takes them to a circus to help them learn to trust their bodies and "trust each other"; the bonding helps Tara and Kat reunite fully. Sammy announces to his friends that he and Ollie are dating, getting a mostly positive reaction, but was pressured, having learnt that Ollie already told his friends; being somewhat "outed", Sammy stresses, initiating an argument and premature split between the two. Christian's dad Raf turns up at the academy and circus hoping to further bond with him, telling him that he will take him to get his learner's license, but later reneges on his offer.
45	19	"The Naturals"	Kirsty Fisher	11 April 2012	N/A
Abigail, having trouble with Zach's practice, is sought by Finn, the producer of the musical Ethan was initially choreographing, and new director Mistii, who both pretend to be planning to cast a ditzy blonde (Mistii) in the lead role. Even after discovering their ploy, Abigail accepts that the role is suited to her. Grace becomes bored with dancing, which she considers beneath her natural ability, and seeks Zach out for more complicated practice. Tara looks for a new crush, saying that there are no crush-worthy guys at the school, when Ben kisses her.
46	20	"Tick, Question Mark, Cross"	Sarah Lambert	12 April 2012	N/A
As a cold goes around at the academy (which Miss Raine, Abigail and Ben have), Abigail discovers an email while waiting in Miss Raine's office that ranks the students' viability for Nationals with either a tick (Tara, Grace and Christian), a cross (Sammy and Abigail) or a question mark in Ben's case, who feels as if this mirrors his life as he waits for the results of his leukemia biopsy check-up. The email, having been sent around, incites the students and angers the teachers. Meanwhile, Sammy is annoyed by criticism from Ollie, Grace is strangely enjoying her intense practice with Zach, and Abigail's ballet teacher mother Anthea arrives at the academy, revealing family troubles and wanting Abigail to dance her old Helen Keller role. Abigail then feels torn between this and her musical role, which she later quits.
47	21	"Ladder Theory"	Holly Phillips	16 April 2012	N/A
Nationals of the Prix de Fonteyn begin, with tensions running high. Ben tries to psych out Christian, pursuing Tara by asking her out. This leaves Kat feeling left out, but Tara grows closer to Ben (who tells her about his "ladder theory", the step up from friendship that a relationship involves). When Ben kisses Tara in front of Christian right before his solo, it distracts Christian and makes Tara realise Ben was using her. Sammy tries to hide having a boyfriend from his father and brother, who come to watch him dance, so he brings Abigail to lunch. After his performance, they find out the truth but are mostly unfazed. Meanwhile, Abigail chooses the musical over her mother's pressure to compete at Nationals. Tara, Grace, Sammy and a Tasmanian student named Michael Slade (Rarmian Newton) who tried to sabotage Sammy's contemporary solo are all chosen to represent Australia on the International stage.
48	22	"Win or Lose"	Josh Mapleston	17 April 2012	N/A
The students selected to represent Australia are featured on (fictional) talk show Gav & Lena, with Sammy having a "meltdown", describing the rivalry between himself and Michael, and reenacting his performance as Michael cut the music off to his piece. Grace, whose father cancels his visit to see her perform, tries to kiss Zach, feeling confused after their closeness during practice sessions, leading to her returning to the UK. Christian and Kat argue over his attitude after his failure to make Nationals, and his reckless behaviour as a result (riding off on a motorcycle after learner's training, neglecting his end-of-year production audition). After Ollie is denied a place in the Company, he loses his cool and harshly criticises Sammy, saying they aren't equal in their abilities, leading Sammy to break up with him.
49	23	"Love It or Fight It"	Courtney Wise	18 April 2012	N/A
Roles for the end-of-year production of Peter Pan are announced, with Christian as Peter, Kat as Tinker Bell, and Abigail as Wendy Darling. Ben goes out of his way to get Tara to like him again, singing and dancing in front of the other students. With Christian's advice, Ben sets up an ice rink on Bondi Beach for her, eventually winning her over. Zach encourages Kat to tap into Tinker Bell's jealous side, which leads her to have an epiphany about Christian. Realising that Christian is still in love with Tara, Kat decides to end their relationship. Abigail decides she needs to take time off from everything (including ballet), and despite visiting Sydney Aquarium with Sammy to "prepare" for a date with Finn, she cancels. Sammy and the other students also think about their future prospects.
50	24	"The Prix de Fonteyn"	Liz Doran	19 April 2012	N/A
The international competitors arrive for the Prix de Fonteyn at the Sydney Opera House as Tara and Sammy go into final preparations. Tara discovers that Grace has returned to represent the UK, and is dancing Tara's Red Shoes solo to prove she's better by winning, which upsets her. Sammy decides to have the others on stage with him despite the rules, but in the end, settles on a video montage accompanying his dance. He asks for Abigail's advice, who loves it; the pair then share a kiss. With the possibility of Tara studying elsewhere and still being in denial about his feelings for her, Christian finally realises how much Tara means to him. Despite her dating Ben, Christian prepares to tell Tara his feelings for her although Sammy advises him not to. After receiving a phone call, Miss Raine tells the students and Christian (who was on his way to the Opera House) that Sammy was hit by a car while out running and died on the way to hospital, leaving everyone in shock and emotional distress. Tara later listens to a voice mail on her phone Sammy had sent her earlier.
51	25	"The Second"	Samantha Strauss	23 April 2012	N/A
After the second-year students attend Sammy's funeral, Miss Raine announces that the Prix de Fonteyn will be delayed for a week, that the production of Peter Pan is cancelled, and that absences will be excused. Abigail, however, throws herself back into training for a new production, while the others begin to plan a "memorial" to grieve and allow a better chance for closure, as everyone vividly remembers how they met Sammy—Miss Raine, who recognised him from not getting through initial auditions for the Academy; Kat, who helped him forge his dad's signature; and Christian, who met him while breakdancing. Christian fights with Kat, who wants to look at Sammy's laptop to play a song at the memorial, and also with Ollie, over Sammy's cardigan. Tara pulls out from the Prix, while Abigail breaks down during auditions for the production; later, the memorial goes ahead on the beach and Ethan returns to join them. Christian reads a eulogy, as well as a list Sammy wrote of the top 50 things he wanted to achieve, with the first being to make a group of close friends he could have for the rest of his life. The group stays all night at the beach, then in the morning, dance and play with each other in the water to remember Sammy.
52	26	"The Red Shoes"	Samantha Strauss	24 April 2012	N/A
After everyone celebrates Christian's 18th birthday on Observatory Hill, Abigail convinces Tara to compete in the Prix again, telling her she'll help her practice, while Ben says that he'll take Sammy's place in the competition, as he was third behind Sammy and Michael. Naturally-talented Grace remains in first place until the last day of competition, when contestants perform their solos. Meanwhile, Kat turns up for her first-year exams despite being given special consideration. Christian visits Tara who invites him back to spend the holidays on the farm despite her dating Ben. Tara confesses that things with Ben are awkward. At the same time Christian's father contacts him and invites him on a road trip during the holiday break to clear his head. Abigail wants Tara to remain focused and to do her Red Shoes solo even though Grace is still going ahead with it. Tara agrees after Abigail convinces her she can do it well. When the final day arrives, Grace's performance is noted by Tara to be "technically and artistically perfect", but Abigail says that she dances without emotion. Tara shows genuine emotion during her performance, imagining Sammy helping her perform, and she receives a standing ovation and emotional responses from everyone, including Grace. Ben, in second place, decides on doing Sammy's piece (with the video montage backdrop), despite choreography having to be approved, and invites his friends onstage. When he finishes, balloons fall down on the group, who embrace, while the judges look bewildered as Zach and Miss Raine also take to the stage. Tara's voiceover concludes the episode by saying that despite Grace winning (and deciding to attend the Academy for third year), it was "never about winning" for her. Christian chooses to spend the holidays motorcycling with his Dad in Tasmania, promising Tara he will return for third year, while Abigail goes to Barcelona with Ethan, and Kat decides to spend her break with Tara on the farm.

=== Series 3 (2013) ===
Dance Academy series three began airing on ABC3 on 8 July 2013. This series follows Tara and her friends in their final year at the Academy, where they are focused on landing a job with The company.

No. overall	No. in series	Title	Written by	Original release date	Australian viewers
53	1	"Glue"	Samantha Strauss	8 July 2013	N/A
The Academy is three weeks into the year. Tara is throwing Abigail her first birthday party, while Christian still has not enrolled or even shown up to the Academy. No one knows where he is or can get in touch with him. There are three openings for fill-ins for the corps de ballet in The Company's production of Giselle.
54	2	"New Rules"	Josh Mapleston	15 July 2013	N/A
Tara finds Christian at his dad's surf shop. He blows her off to be with his new and reckless friends. Tara, Ben, and Grace rehearse for Giselle. Kat helps Abigail appeal to other dance companies. Saskia is back and gives Tara a journal to express her feelings about the school year.
55	3	"Second Chances"	Liz Doran	22 July 2013	N/A
Christian catches up with his friends at the Academy and goes through an interview to renew his scholarship. Grace starts meddling in Ms. Raine's private life so that Ms. Raine will stop messing with her. Marcus Caine, Ms. Raine's boyfriend while she was a student and company dancer, comes to the Academy to help the second year students. He gives them an assignment to study a non-dancer and then reinterpret that person in a dance. Abigail and Christian spend the day together, which inspires Christian to stay at the Academy. Kat takes her second year assignment as an opportunity to study a man named Nick Hesk, who is the driver that hit Sammy in series two. She begins to feel insecure and becomes bulimic. She talks to Nick again and hears his side of the story. In the end, Kat ends up not using Nick as her assignment; she uses herself.
56	4	"Short Cut Clause"	Kirsty Fisher	29 July 2013	N/A
Saskia offers to become Ben's mentor after seeing him and Tara dancing together onstage after a performance of Giselle. While Ben is torn between loyalty to Tara and fast-tracking his career, after a session with Saskia, he starts to feel comfortable with the idea, although Tara suspects Saskia has an ulterior motive. Abigail returns to her classes and she and Christian post Ollie's music video online without permission; Ollie later takes Abigail to a commercial dancer's class to prove she isn't up to standard but it results in Abigail signing on for beginners' classes. Tara worries about Kat after noticing she is not eating in public anymore and gets hypothetical advice from Dr Wicks. Kat gets mad at her when confronted about her bulimia. Christian calls Tara after finding Kat upset and she leaves a Company performance to comfort her friend.
57	5	"Negative Patterns"	Samantha Strauss	5 August 2013	N/A
Tara, Ben and Grace near the end of their stint as fill-ins for Giselle, but Saskia arranges an early audition for Ben with The Company's artistic director Sir Jeffrey. However, Ben is worried when Saskia also asks him out. Ollie and Abigail are making a music video; Abigail hires Kat as a dancer to take her mind off her bulimia while Zach agrees to let Christian take part as part of his make-up classes. Ollie and Christian clash over Christian changing the choreography and Christian walks off the shoot but Ollie ends up using his ideas. Grace is considered for a place on tour but loses out on both the tour spot and a place in the gala when the girl she was replacing returns unexpectedly. Coupled with the news that Miss Raine is engaged to Marcus, she sabotages the dance outfits with heat cream. Saskia and Ben fill the gap with a performance of the Black Swan but Saskia deliberately falls and runs off stage. Tara joins Ben on stage, repairing their friendship but earning them both Sir Jeffrey's scorn.
58	6	"Fake It Until You Make It"	Greg Waters	12 August 2013	N/A
The cast list for the third year's touring show of Romeo and Juliet is posted. Ben is Romeo with Grace as Juliet. Tara plays Lady Capulet, Christian as the Nurse, Ollie as Mercutio, with Abigail playing Benvolio, a minor male part. Tara and Christian are selected to understudy the leads. With the arrival of Wes Cooper, the choreographer for the contemporary piece in the third year tour and Ethan's flatmate from Spain, more of Abigail's vacation is revealed: She had a fling with Wes in Barcelona but feels guilty about dating him so soon after Sammy's death and refuses to audition for his solo piece. Meanwhile, a movie requiring dancers hosts auditions at the academy, with Kat and Abigail auditioning for minor roles. Ollie begins flirting with the male lead of the film. Grace struggles with her feelings about her mother who also had the part of Juliet. Tara, now dating Ben again, tries not to be jealous of him working closely with Grace, but when Tara and Ben go bowling together Grace invites herself and Christian along to cause trouble. Abigail misses rehearsals for the tour to audition for the film. Kat is rejected as a dancer so helps Abigail with her audition, but the director, Gabrielle, seems more interested in her.
59	7	"Graceland"	Kirsty Fisher	19 August 2013	N/A
Zach attempts to enforce discipline on the third years out on tour. Kat begins filming for the movie, in which she has been cast as the lead. She clashes with Jamie, the third assistant director assigned to look after the class, but refuses an offer to have him dismissed and they end up on better terms. Things continue to be tense between Abigail and Wes. A night time game of truth or dare and Ben, Grace and Christian taking part in the traditional "dawn challenge"(in which the contestants have to run naked, collect three items of clothes and photograph themselves by the fountain) results in Grace being arrested and Ben playing sick so Christian can take the part of Romeo after finishing behind him and losing a bet. Despite Ben trying to stick up for her, Grace is sent home, and Zach announces Ben and Christian will alternate, leaving Christian dancing with Tara.
60	8	"Traveling Light"	Melina Marchetta	26 August 2013	N/A
The tour is on its last stop, at an Aboriginal town, and Ben and Tara still have not worked out their chemistry for Romeo and Juliet compared to how Tara and Christian operate. Kat is disappointed when the film hires Grace as her dancing double, but the two girls end up bonding over their mutual insecurities. Tara decides to sleep with Ben but they are unable to go through with it, and Tara learns Kat never slept with Christian. The tour attempt to give dance lessons to the local children but Abigail's harsh teaching nearly reduces the girls to tears and Ollie's hip hop lesson leaves the boys unimpressed; Tara and Christian end up taking over and Christian takes an interest in Jayden, a talented boy from a poor family. Abigail, who had been trying to get Wes to give her his solo instead of Tara, tells him she's lost too much that she loves to risk it again, but a free-spirited dance and a kiss with Wes seem to change her mind. Ben reads Tara's journal and is annoyed that she talks so much about Christian; Tara is upset that she can't get rid of her feelings for him.
61	9	"Don't Let Me Down Gently"	Courtney Wise	2 September 2013	N/A
Kat finishes filming her movie and accepts a date with crew member Jamie. After spending a chaste night with Christian and realising she still has feelings for him, Tara breaks up with Ben who has trouble accepting the relationship is over. An injury means Ollie has to pull out of the festival so he accompanies Rhys to the wrap party; Rhys is disappointed that he seems more interested in networking, but arranges for him to sing in front of the crew. Kat is worried about ruining her friendship with Jamie but still kisses him on the dance floor. Abigail becomes paranoid when Wes is rejected for a job at the Company; he offers to get a job in Sydney but she suggests they pursue a long distance relationship. Christian volunteers to take over as Mercutio so Ben can play Romeo at the festival, and their love triangle seems to come to a head during the performance.
62	10	"N'Fektd"	Liz Doran	9 September 2013	N/A
Ollie and Christian put together a crew for the Street Beatz battle. After Grace and Ben fail to make Tara jealous, they decide to start their own crew for the battles in an effort to get back at Christian, and rope Abigail in to help them. Jayden also turns up and Christian convinces Ollie to let him join the crew. The second years are auditioning for Coppelia but Lulu, top of the class, dictates who all the other girls are allowed to audition for. Tara helps Kat practise for a minor role but, after some encouragement from Jamie, Kat leads a rebellion to try out for the lead. Christian reluctantly beats Ben in the Street Beatz battle, then refuses to meet with Sammy's father when he tries to make a donation to the academy in Sammy's memory, upsets Jayden and goes surfing on the day of the final. He ends up apologising to Jayden and suggesting a drop-in centre for children who can't afford dance classes, but he and Ollie still end up outclassed in the final.
63	11	"Start of an Era"	Josh Mapleston	16 September 2013	N/A
Christian tells Tara he's ready to commit but she is reluctant and confused after his recent behaviour towards her and wonders if their previous failed relationships are a sign it will never work out. Sir Jeffrey unexpectedly resigns as musical director, leaving Rebecca in charge. Tara's back injury becomes a problem and she is told to take time off from rehearsals; with her audition coming up in a few weeks, she goes to see Saskia, who Rebecca has dismissed from the company, for advice. Saskia convinces her to forget the complex solo Miss Raine assigned her and try the simple but artistic Persephone solo. Kat lands the lead role in Coppélia. Ben and Grace need Kat's help in executing muck-up day and she organises a seaweed fight between the third and second years. Ollie meets Jessica Mauboy, who tells him she is a fan of his music. He and Abigail audition to be her warm-up act on tour, and must decide between the auditions and accepting her offer.
64	12	"The Perfect Storm"	Samantha Strauss	23 September 2013	N/A
Kat attends the premiere of her film, despite being disappointed by a review that called her "clunky", but not all goes smoothly and she trips on the red carpet. Grace misinterprets her time spent with Ben to be more than a friendship and, when Marcus offers her a place at Austin, she tries to use it to pressure Rebecca into taking them on at the Company, leaving Ben accusing her of ruining his chances. When she sees him rehearsing together with Tara, she sabotages Tara's costume. Ollie, doing the cursed Macbeth solo, locks himself in his room on the night of the auditions but is rescued by Kat, Jamie and Rhys, and kisses Rhys before going on stage. Tara arranges for Raf to watch Christian's audition. Ben changes his piece at the last minute but Miss Raine convinces Tara to do the piece she worked on with Saskia. Tara slips on a bead, accidentally left on stage by Grace during her audition, causing serious injury.
65	13	"Not for Nothing"	Samantha Strauss	30 September 2013	N/A
The Academy students must deal with their professional futures being laid out for them; while some receive Company contracts, most do not. Christian must choose between dancing for the Company or teaching at the Sammy E. Lieberman Memorial Studio for kids who cannot afford a dance education. In the end, he chooses teaching. Tara must come to terms with the fact she may never dance again due to her injury. Kat chooses an acting career after finishing second year. The episode ends in an open house for Sammy's memorial studio, where the Academy graduates all perform, except for Tara, who has not danced in months. Christian invites her to dance along (within reason of her injury) and he tells her that they'll take things slow, hinting at a possible relationship re-igniting between the two. The reason for Tara's narrative throughout the three series is revealed as her writing a book about her life at the Academy.

=== Movie (2017) ===
The movie based on the series, featuring most of the original cast, was released in Australia on 6 April 2017.

No. overall	No. in series	Title	Written by	Original release date	Australian viewers
66	1	"The Movie"	Samantha Strauss	6 April 2017	N/A
Tara is suing the company for negligence over her accident but the new director, Madeline Moncur, invites her to audition instead. Despite training from Christian and Abigail, she is rejected. She heads to New York, where Kat is starring as a fairy in a show, to audition there but faces further rejection. Upset that she left just as they were about to move in together, Christian breaks up with her. After also falling out with Kat, Tara goes to stay with Miss Raine and finds Ben there; his leukaemia has reoccurred and he has just had a stem cell transplant. Tara and Ben choreograph a new piece, "Enoumént", and enter it in the fringe section of the New York festival. Tara is seen performing by Madeline and offered a position in the company, with Ollie taking her place performing with Ben. Abigail is told to train Tara in her solo. Kat is slated by the press after leaking naked photos of herself to try and change her image. Ben collapses during a performance and Tara leaves the theatre to be by his side. The gang reunite at the hospital; Christian also appears and reunites with Tara, while Ben and Kat also get together. Tara resigns from the company. Abigail and Ollie perform Enoumént at the gala with Tara directing. The movie ends with the gang having seemingly set up their own company and academy in the memorial studio, with Tara as choreographer.
