= 58th AWGIE Awards =

Award ceremony for writing of 2025

The 58th annual AWGIE Awards, presented by the Australian Writers' Guild, took place on 19 February 2026 at the Parade Theatre at National Institute of Dramatic Art, Sydney. The ceremony was hosted by comedians Alex Lee and Suren Jayemanne. The nominations were announced on 21 January 2026.

== Winners and nominees ==
Winners are listed first and highlighted in boldface.

=== Film ===
**Feature Film – Original**
- **Saccharine – Natalie Erika James**
  - One More Shot – Alice Foulcher and Gregory Erdstein
  - Sweet Milk Lake – Harvey Zielinski
  - Together – Michael Shanks
  - Zero – Jesse Laurie
**Feature Film – Adapted**
- **The Correspondent – Peter Duncan; based on the memoir The First Casualty by Peter Greste**
  - The Roses – Tony McNamara; based on the novel The War of the Roses by Warren Adler
  - Snatchers – Craig Alexander
**Short Film**
- **Asian Male Lead – Brendan Wan with Aran Thangaratnam, Jeremy Teh, and Vivian Nguyen**
  - DIY – Lachlan Marks
  - The Dysphoria – Kylie Aoibheann
  - Nothing, Number 2 – Marcus Khoudair
  - Saint Valentine – Vanessa Gazy
  - Tuesday Tuesday – Lianne Mackessy and Emily Sheehan

=== Television ===
**Television – Serial**
- **Hollyoaks: Episode 6522 – Gary Sewell**
- **Home and Away: Episode 8330 – Fiona Kelly** (Seven Network)
  - Home and Away: Episode 8405 – Alexandra Cullen (Seven Network)
  - Neighbours: Episode 9104 – Emma J. Steele (Network 10)
**Television – Series**
- **Invisible Boys: "Vigil" – Allan Clarke (Stan)**
  - Black Snow: "Running" – Lucas Taylor (Stan)
  - Bump: "A Hand Shaped Balloon" – Kelsey Munro (Stan)
  - Good Cop/Bad Cop: "Buckle Up" – Clare Sladden (Stan)
  - The Newsreader: "Behind the Front Line" – Christine Bartlett (ABC)
**Television – Limited Series**
- **Apple Cider Vinegar – Samantha Strauss, Angela Betzien, and Anya Beyersdorf (Netflix)**
  - The Last Anniversary – Samantha Strauss, Giula Sandler, Sarah L. Walker, and Greg Waters (Binge)
  - The Narrow Road to the Deep North – Shaun Grant (Prime Video)
  - Plum – Brendan Cowell and Fiona Seres (ABC)
**Comedy – Situation or Narrative**
- **Colin from Accounts: "Waterfall" – Patrick Brammall (Binge)**
  - Austin: "Pulped Fiction" – Adam Zwar (ABC)
  - Fisk: "Burning Up" – Penny Flanagan with Kitty Flanagan (ABC)
  - Strife: "Sometimes Always" – Sarah Scheller (Binge)
  - Urvi Went to an All Girls School: "The Perfect Bell" – Urvi Majumdar and Nina Oyama (ABC)
**Comedy – Sketch or Light Entertainment**
- **The Weekly: "Rhysearch" – Nicolette Minster with Rhys Nicholson and Aleisha McCormack (ABC)**
  - The Last Year of Television: "2024" – Mitch McTaggart (Binge)
  - The Weekly: "The Week in TV with Margaret Pomeranz" – Rob Hunter (ABC)

=== Children's Television ===
**Children's Television – 'P' Classification (Preschool – Under 5 Years)**
- **Kangaroo Beach: "Hungry the Seagull" – Charlotte Rose Hamlyn (ABC Kids)**
  - Kangaroo Beach: "The Curse of Boomerang Island" – Sylvie van Dijk and Angus Woodiwiss (ABC Kids)
  - Zip and the Tiny Sprouts: "Everything Keeps Changing?!" – Peter Johnston
**Children's Television – 'C' Classification (Children's – 5-14 Years)**
- **Spooky Files: "FOMO Dojo Casa House" – Emma Gordon (ABC Family)**
  - Rock Island Mysteries: "Crystallised" – Trent Roberts (Nickelodeon)
  - Rock Island Mysteries: "Sleepwalker" – Matthew Bon (Nickelodeon)
  - Spooky Files: "The Arrival" – Marisa Nanakhorn Brown (ABC Family)
  - Spooky Files: "Eye Go Night-Night" – Guy Edmonds and Andrea Denholm (ABC Family)

=== Audio ===
**Audio – Fiction**
- **Central Intelligence: "Season 1, Episode 10" – Greg Haddrick**
  - Incoming: "Vesti La Giubba (Put on the Costume)" – C.K. Pahlow with David Singer
**Audio – Non-Fiction**
- **This is Not A Game – Marc Fennell and Emma Weatherill**

=== Stage ===
**Stage – Original**
- **Into the Shimmering World – Angus Cerini**
  - All Boys – Xavier Hazard
  - American Signs – Anchuli Felicia King
  - The Past is a Wild Party – Noëlle Janaczewska
  - The Queen's Nanny – Melanie Tait
**Stage – Adapted**
- **The Magic Hour – Vanessa Bates**
  - A Fool in Love – Van Badham; based on the play La dama boba by Lope de Vega
**Musical Theatre**
- **My Brilliant Career – Sheridan Harbridge and Dean Bryant with Mathew Frank**
  - The Questions – Van Badham and Richard Wise
**Community Theatre**
- **Women of the Riverina – Lliane Clarke with Aunty Cheryl Penrith OAM, Arvis Casanova, Claudia Haines, Gabrielle Tozer, Haya Arzidin, Imogen Rubi, Jody Roberts, Lliane Clarke, Marie Clear, Melanie Reeves, Roz Hasan, and Saasha McMillan**
  - We've Got All the Time in the World* (Terms and Conditions Apply) – Jamie Hornsby
**Theatre for Young Audience**
- **The Story of Chi – Jeremy Nguyen with Hiroki Kobayash and Hoa Pham**
  - Feathers – Dan Giovannoni
  - The Girl Who Glows – Jo Turner with Zeeko

=== Other categories ===
**Animation**
- **DeadBeat Ends Meet: Invasive (Quest)ions - Michael Greaney**
**Comedy – Stand-Up**
- **Pillows xxxx – Bronwyn Kuss**
  - Totally Normal – Nazeem Hussain
**Documentary – Public Broadcast (Including VOD) or Exhibition**
- **Not Only Fred Dagg But Also John Clarke – Lorin Clarke**
  - Journey Home: David Gulpilil – Maggie Miles and Trisha Morton-Thomas
  - Stuff the British Stole: "Irish Giant" – Marc Fennell with Stephanie Weimar
  - Surviving Malka Leifer – Adam Kamien and Ivan O'Mahoney with Jane Usher
  - Yirrkala Barks the Journey Home – Larissa Behrendt
**Interactive Media and Gaming**
- **Copycat** **– Samantha Cable**
**Web Series and Other Non-Broadcast/Non-'Subscription Video on Demand' TV Short Works**
- **Buried – Charlotte George and Miriam Glaser**
  - Bad Ancestors – Wendy Mocke
  - Ruff and Ruby – Jess Fisher
