= Strictly Ballroom (musical) =

Musical Theatre

- Music: Various
- Lyrics: Various
- Book: Baz Luhrmann & Craig Pearce
- Basis: 1992 film Strictly Ballroom
- Premiere: 12 April 2014: Sydney Lyric, Sydney
- Productions: 2014 Sydney; 2015 Melbourne; 2016 Leeds; 2017 Toronto; 2018 West End; 2022 UK Tour

Strictly Ballroom the Musical is a musical theatre adaptation of the 1992 film Strictly Ballroom. It is credited as being created by Baz Luhrmann with book by Baz Luhrmann and Craig Pearce adapted by Terry Johnson.

There are two versions of the show - one consists of a score of existing music and songs, with previous productions featuring a mix of existing songs alongside new musical numbers written for the show by David Foster, Sia, Isaac Hasson, Bernie Herms, Baz Luhrmann, MoZella, Neff-U, Craig Pearce, Eddie Perfect and Linda Thompson. Both productions feature songs such as "Perhaps Perhaps Perhaps" and "Time After Time".

== Production history ==
In May 2011, it was announced that Strictly Ballroom would be adapted into a stage musical. The musical was premièred at the Sydney Lyric on 12 April 2014, featuring Thomas Lacey as Scott and Phoebe Panaretos as Fran, where it received mixed reviews. Parts of the musical were reworked, including a new opening number, for the Melbourne season which opened at Her Majesty's Theatre in January 2015. The Melbourne season was better received, and the musical subsequently toured to the Lyric Theatre, QPAC in Brisbane in September 2015. At the 2014 Helpmann Awards, Strictly Ballroom received seven nominations including for Best Musical.

On 3 December 2019, it was announced the show would embark on a UK Tour directed by Strictly Come Dancing judge Craig Revel Horwood in September 2020. Due to the Impact of the COVID-19 Pandemic on the performing arts, the tour has been postponed twice to 2021 and then 2022.

=== West End Production ===
With a further revised book, the removal of all new songs, and the introduction of many more popular songs, a new production directed and choreographed by Drew McOnie, received its British premiere on 30 November 2016 at the West Yorkshire Playhouse in Leeds. The musical received its North American premiere in Toronto at the Princess of Wales Theatre on 25 April 2017.

This version transferred to the West End at the Piccadilly Theatre on 24 April 2018, following previews from 29 March. The showOn 31 July 2018, Matt Cardle took over the role of Wally Strand.

== Musical numbers ==
Act 1

- Love Is In The Air (Vanda/Young)
- Let's Dance (David Bowie)
- Let's Groove (Wayne Lee Vaughn, Maurice White)
- Magdalena Mi Amor (Quimbara) (Luis Rios Capeda)
- Push It (Herby Azor)
- Fireball (Eric Frederic, Ilsey Juber, Tom Peyton, Armando Perez, John Ryan, Andreas Schuller, Joseph Spargur)
- Get Down On It (Bell, Smith, Brown, Taylor, Mickens, Bell, Deodato)
- Happy Feet (Jack Yellen, Milton Ager)
- La Cumparsita (Conturs, Maroni, Matros-Rodriguez, Raven)
- Dancing With Myself (Billy Idol, Anthony Eric James)
- Think (Ted White, Aretha Franklin)
- I'm So Excited (Pointer Sisters, Trevor Lawrence)
- Os Quindins De Yaya (Angel May Care) (Ary Barroso, Erwin Drake)
- Time After Time (Cyndi Lauper, Rob Hyman)
- Every Little Thing She Does Is Magic (Sting)
- The Blue Danube (Strauss)
- Perhaps, Perhaps, Perhaps (Osvaldo Farres, Joe Davis)
- Sway (Pablo Beltran Ruiz, Luis Demetrio Traconis Molinas, Normal Gimbel)
- I Wanna Dance With Somebody (Rubicam, Merrill)
- Scott's Paso Doble (Elliott Wheeler)
- Rico's Paso Doble (Elliott Wheeler)
- Habanera (Bizet)

Act 2

- Teardrops (Zeriiya Zekkariyas)
- Get Up, Stand Up (Marley)
- Slave To The Rhythm (Woolley, Darlow, Lipson, Horn)
- In The Hall Of The Mountain King (Grieg)
- Mambo No. 5 (Bega, Prado, Zippy)
- Hound Dog (Mike Stoller, Jerry Leiber)
- Sugar, Sugar (Barry, Kim)
- Sing, Sing, Sing (Louis Prima)
- Tequila (Chuck Rio)
- Espana Cani (Pascual Marquina Narro)
- Fight The Power (Ridenhour, Boxley II, Boxley, Sadler)
- It's The End of the World As We Know It (Stipe, Mills, Buck, Berry)
- Dancing In The Street (Marvin Gaye, Ivy Hunter, William Stevenson)

== Roles and original casts ==
=== Original productions ===
| Character | Sydney (2014) Lyric Theatre | West End (2018) Piccadilly Theatre |
|---|---|---|
| Scott Hastings | Thomas Lacey | Jonny Labey |
| Fran (Just Fran) | Phoebe Panaretos | Zizi Strallen |
| Wally Strand | | Will Young |
| Pam Short, Natalie, Charm, Auditionee | Angela Kennedy (as Charm) Angie Stapleton (as Pam Short) | Michelle Bishop |
| Merv | Damien Bermingham | Ivan De Freitas |
| Shirley Hastings | Heather Mitchell | Anna Francolini |
| Vanessa Cronin | Ash Bee | Gabriela Garcia |
| Tina Sparkle | Nadia Coote | Charlotte Gooch |
| Les Kendall | Bob Baines | Richard Greive |
| Barry Fife | | Gerard Horan |
| Wayne Burns | Andrew Cook | Liam Marcellino |
| Doug Hastings | Drew Forsythe | Stephen Matthews |
| Rico | Fernando Mira | Fernando Mira |
| Abuela | | Eve Polycarpou |
| Liz Holt | Sophia Katos | Lauren Stroud |
| Ken Railings | Rohan Browne | Gary Watson |
