= List of 2017 box office number-one films in Australia =

This is a list of films which have placed number one at the box office in Australia during 2017. All amounts are in Australian dollars and from Box Office Mojo.

#	Weekend end date	Film	Weekend gross	Top 20 openings
1	8 January 2017	Assassin's Creed	$6,281,526	None
2	15 January 2017	Sing	$2,327,969	Monster Trucks (#6), Middle School: The Worst Years of My Life (#10), Ballerina (#11), Collateral Beauty (#12), Jackie (#14), Bairavaa (#18)
3	22 January 2017	Lion	$4,197,367	xXx: Return of Xander Cage (#2)
4	29 January 2017	Lion	$4,185,509	Split (#2), Resident Evil: The Final Chapter (#4), Live by Night (#11), Raees (#12), Moonlight (#19), Journey to the West: The Demons Strike Back (#20)
5	5 February 2017	Lion	$3,058,542	Patriots Day (#3), Manchester by the Sea (#7), Gold (#8)
6	12 February 2017	Fifty Shades Darker	$6,164,803	Fences (#9), Jolly LLB 2 (#13)
7	19 February 2017	Hidden Figures	$4,769,984	The Great Wall (#3), Sleepless (#17)
8	26 February 2017	The Great Wall	$1,618,016	T2 Trainspotting (#3), Rings (#4)
9	5 March 2017	Logan	$7,830,044	
10	12 March 2017	Logan	$4,559,489	
11	19 March 2017	Logan	$2,839,138	A Cure for Wellness (#4), The Eagle Huntress (#7)
12	26 March 2017	Beauty and the Beast	$3,136,875	The Boss Baby (#2), Life (#3), Power Rangers (#4)
13	2 April 2017	Beauty and the Beast	$7,754,608	Ghost in the Shell (#2), Smurfs: The Lost Village (#6)
14	9 April 2017	Beauty and the Beast	$4,967,632	CHiPs (#5)
15	16 April 2017	The Fate of the Furious	$12,665,256	None
16	23 April 2017	The Fate of the Furious	$4,956,104	Going in Style (#4), Table 19 (#6)
17	30 April 2017	Guardians of the Galaxy Vol. 2	$15,728,284	Baahubali 2: The Conclusion (#3), Love Off the Cuff (#10), Battle of Memories (#13), Rules Don't Apply (#19)
18	7 May 2017	Guardians of the Galaxy Vol. 2	$4,993,018	Get Out (#2), A Dog's Purpose (#3), The Zookeeper's Wife (#8), The Case for Christ (#9), Shock Wave (#16)
19	14 May 2017	Alien: Covenant	$3,958,047	Snatched (#2), Lahoriye (#8), I Am Heath Ledger (#12), Whiteley (#19), Sarkar 3 (#20)
20	21 May 2017	King Arthur: Legend of the Sword	$2,326,536	John Wick: Chapter 2 (#4), Viceroy's House (#7), Don't Tell (#14), Fairy Tail: Dragon Cry (#15)
21	28 May 2017	Pirates of the Caribbean: Dead Men Tell No Tales	$5,885,410	The Shack (#10), Sachin (#11), Neruda (#16), Saab Bahadur (#17)
22	4 June 2017	Wonder Woman	$6,768,064	Baywatch (#2), 20th Century Women (#11), Norman (#16)
23	11 June 2017	Wonder Woman	$5,700,000	The Mummy (#2), My Cousin Rachel (#5), Churchill (#7)
24	18 June 2017	Despicable Me 3	$5,884,975	Rough Night (#3)
25	25 June 2017	Transformers: The Last Knight	$4,468,592	Cars 3 (#3), Tubelight (#9), A Quiet Passion (#13), Una (#17), McLaren (#18)
26	2 July 2017	Despicable Me 3	$3,426,901	The House (#5), Diary of a Wimpy Kid: The Long Haul (#6), Lady Macbeth (#14), Chocolat (#17)
27	9 July 2017	Spider-Man: Homecoming	$10,130,218	It Comes at Night (#10), Ninnu Kori (#18)
28	16 July 2017	Spider-Man: Homecoming	$4,922,074	Baby Driver (#2), The Beguiled (#8), Jagga Jasoos (#11), Wukong (#15)
29	23 July 2017	Dunkirk	$6,002,602	The Black Prince (#13), Vikram Vedha (#14), Evangelion: New Theatrical Edition (#16)
30	30 July 2017	War for the Planet of the Apes	$4,077,791	André Rieu's 2017 Maastricht Concert (#4), Vekh Baraatan Challiyan (#9), Wolf Warriors 2 (#12), Mubarakan (#13), A Monster Calls (#16), Kiki, el amor se hace (#20)
31	6 August 2017	Dunkirk	$2,697,606	Atomic Blonde (#3), The Big Sick (#4), Jab Harry Met Sejal (#9), The Trip to Spain (#10), Brotherhood of Blades II: The Infernal Battlefield (#16)
32	13 August 2017	Annabelle: Creation	$2,287,641	Valerian and the City of a Thousand Planets (#3), Wind River (#10), Toilet: Ek Prem Katha (#12), Velaiilla Pattadhari 2 (#16), An Inconvenient Sequel: Truth to Power (#18), The Battleship Island (#19), The Time of Their Lives (#20)
33	20 August 2017	Annabelle: Creation	$1,526,017	The Dark Tower (#2), Logan Lucky (#4), Hampstead (#5), Madame (#15), The Adventurers (#19), Gintama (#20)
34	27 August 2017	American Made	$2,138,945	Mayweather vs. McGregor (#6), 47 Meters Down (#11), Vivegam (#12), Terminator 2: Judgment Day 3D (#13), All for One (#16), A Taxi Driver (#17), Arjun Reddy (#18)
35	3 September 2017	The Hitman's Bodyguard	$2,330,317	Girls Trip (#3), Ali's Wedding (#8), Gifted (#9), Baadshaho (#17)
36	10 September 2017	It	$7,467,255	The Dinner (#12), That's Not Me (#20)
37	17 September 2017	It	$4,991,174	The Emoji Movie (#2), Victoria & Abdul (#3), American Assassin (#4), Mother! (#5), Rip Tide (#14), Lucknow Central (#17), Simran (#18), I Am Not Your Negro (#20)
38	24 September 2017	Kingsman: The Golden Circle	$5,716,906	Captain Underpants: The First Epic Movie (#5), The Lego Ninjago Movie (#6), Nikka Zaildar 2 (#10), Mountain (#12), Tokyo Ghoul (#16), Beatriz at Dinner (#18), Bhoomi (#20)
39	1 October 2017	Kingsman: The Golden Circle	$3,606,125	Flatliners (#5), Battle of the Sexes (#8), Blade Runner: The Final Cut (#12)
40	8 October 2017	Blade Runner 2049	$4,528,430	Never Say Die (#10), Final Portrait (#11), Chasing the Dragon (#12), Shopkins: World Vacation (#14), Fireworks, Should We See It from the Side or the Bottom? (#16)
41	15 October 2017	Blade Runner 2049	$2,615,742	The Mountain Between Us (#2), Happy Death Day (#3), The Foreigner (#12), The Only Living Boy in New York (#16)
42	22 October 2017	Geostorm	$1,539,180	The Snowman (#4), Home Again (#6), Mersal (#8), Golmaal Again (#9), The Son of Bigfoot (#11), Secret Superstar (#15)
43	29 October 2017	Thor: Ragnarok	$10,135,906	Suburbicon (#5), The Midwife (#15), Bhalwan Singh (#20)
44	5 November 2017	Thor: Ragnarok	$6,681,223	A Bad Moms Christmas (#2), Jigsaw (#3), My Little Pony: The Movie (#5), Loving Vincent (#9), Ittefaq (#14)
45	12 November 2017	Murder on the Orient Express	$3,851,171	Conor McGregor: Notorious (#7), Detroit (#10)
46	19 November 2017	Justice League	$8,088,271	Louis Theroux: Heroin Town (#6), The Killing of a Sacred Deer (#8), Fate/stay night: Heaven's Feel I. presage flower (#12), Tumhari Sulu (#13), Hokusai: Old Man Crazy to Paint (#16), Theeran Adhigaaram Ondru (#17), Borg McEnroe (#19)
47	26 November 2017	Justice League	$3,348,726	Daddy's Home 2 (#2), Goodbye Christopher Robin (#6), The Teacher (#9), Tulip Fever (#13), Explosion (#19)
48	3 December 2017	Wonder	$2,407,868	Only the Brave (#8), The Star (#9), The Man Who Invented Christmas (#10), The Disaster Artist (#11), No Game, No Life the Movie: Zero (#12), Firangi (#17), The Swindlers (#19)
49	10 December 2017	Wonder	$1,743,858	Wonder Wheel (#12), Fukrey Returns (#14), The Secret Scripture (#18)
50	17 December 2017	Star Wars: The Last Jedi	$20,977,461	Ferdinand (#2), Youth (#10), Unexpectedly Yours (#16), The Thousand Faces of Dunjia (#20)
51	24 December 2017	Star Wars: The Last Jedi	$7,067,130	Paddington 2 (#3), Jumanji: Welcome to the Jungle (#4), Tiger Zinda Hai (#7), Velaikkaran (#13), MCA (Middle Class Abbayi) (#14), Legend of the Demon Cat (#15)
52	31 December 2017	Jumanji: Welcome to the Jungle	$9,222,665	The Greatest Showman (#3), Coco (#4), Downsizing (#7), Call Me by Your Name (#10), Ôtez-moi d'un doute (#11), The Ex-File 3: The Return of the Exes (#19)

== Highest-grossing films ==
Highest-grossing films of 2017
Rank	Title	Distributor	Domestic gross
1	Star Wars: The Last Jedi	Disney	$35,513,254
2	Beauty and the Beast	Disney	$34,951,867
3	Thor: Ragnarok	Disney	$26,767,861
4	Despicable Me 3	Universal	$25,028,211
5	Guardians of the Galaxy Vol. 2	Disney	$24,606,403
6	Wonder Woman	Warner Bros.	$23,400,000
7	Lion	Transmission Films	$21,735,567
8	The Fate of the Furious	Universal	$21,415,926
9	Spider-Man: Homecoming	Sony	$19,703,898
10	It	Warner Bros.	$18,800,000

== See also ==
- List of Australian films – Australian films by year
- 2017 in film
