= Phoebe Panaretos =

Australian actress and singer

- Born: 1989 or 1990 (age 35–36)
- Occupations: Actress; Singer

Phoebe Panaretos (born 1990) is an Australian actress and singer, notable for roles in musical theatre in Australia.

== Early life ==
Panaretos studied drama at Sydney's Newtown High School of the Performing Arts in 2008.

== Career ==
She played the lead role of Fran in the stage musical Strictly Ballroom from 2014, Connie Francis in Dream Lover: The Bobby Darin Musical in 2016, and Whatsername in the Australian production of Green Day's American Idiot from 2017. Phoebe also played the role of Elly in the Australian premiere of David Bowie’s Lazarus in 2019 before moving London.
