= Crown Street Public School =

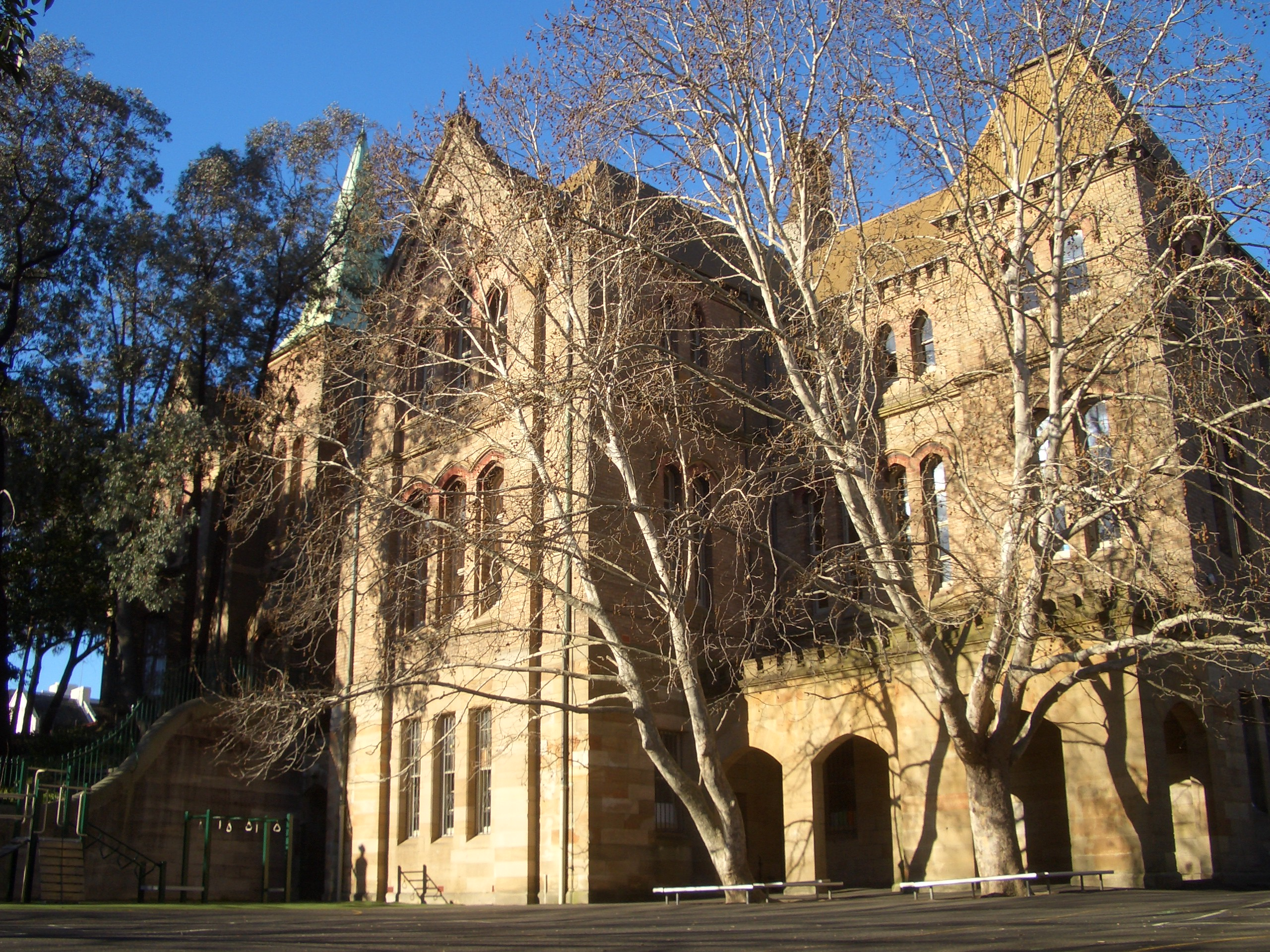
- The sandstone facade of Crown Street Public School in 2007

Location
- 356 Crown Street, Surry Hills; Sydney, Australia, New South Wales; 33°52′56″S 151°12′55″E

Information
- School type: Government of New South Wales, primary school
- Motto: Equity and Excellence in Education since 1849
- Established: 1863
- Status: Open
- Educational authority: NSW Department of Education
- Principal: Craig Nielsen
- Enrollment: 283 (31 December 2018)
- Website: crownst-p.schools.nsw.gov.au
- Building details

General information
- Architectural style: Gothic Revival

Design and construction
- Architect: George Allen Mansfield

New South Wales Heritage Register
- Official name: Crown Street Public School
- Type: State heritage (built)
- Designated: 2 April 1999
- Reference no.: 562
- Type: School – state (public)
- Category: Education
- Builders: A. Scott (masonry and brickwork); Mackay and Son (carpentry and finishing)

The Crown Street Public School is a heritage-listed public primary school located at Crown Street, Surry Hills, Sydney, New South Wales, Australia. It was designed by George Allen Mansfield and built in 1869 by A. Scott (masonry and brickwork), and Mackay and Son (carpentry and finishing).

== History ==
Crown Street Public School dates from April 1863, when Bourke Street National School was opened in a building rented from the Bourke Street Congregational Church.

In March 1876 the secretary of the Bourke Street Public School Local Board applied to the Council of Education for additional furniture for the school. On this very ordinary request appears the notation that the council directed the inspector to find a suitable site on which to erect a new public school. In June 1876 the secretary for the Bourke Street Congregational Church asked for increased rent for the school premises. He also made it clear that the deacons believed it was time that a public school worthy of the neighbourhood was provided.

The Council of Education decided to acquire a site from W. M. MacKenzie on which to erect a new school building, located directly behind the rented school building. The present site in Crown Street was purchased in 1877. Three temporary wooden buildings were erected on the new site and the school moved into these in March 1878. At the same time the name of the school was changed to Crown Street Public School.

Enrolments grew rapidly and the temporary buildings were extremely uncomfortable and overcrowded. By May 1878, 1,035 children were enrolled. This had grown to 1,405 by the end of the year. By 1879 there were 1,608 children enrolled. During the winter three teachers found the over-crowding and draughty conditions so difficult that they asked for removal to another school. No action was taken, since the new building was expected to solve the school's problems.

During 1879 a permanent building was begun, designed by the Council of Education architect G. A. Mansfield to accommodate approximately 1,200 pupils. The tenders of Mr A. Scott for masonry and brickwork and Messrs Mackay and Son for carpentry and finishing trades were accepted in July 1878. The two storey permanent building was occupied in May 1880. The temporary buildings were moved to Surry Hills South (later Bourke Street) Public School.

In 1883 the headmaster, Mr Banks, complained about an objectionable picture on the wall of a house adjoining the playground. There were various proposals as to how to reduce the objectionable character of the advertisement, and finally it was painted out at departmental expense.

Unfortunately the new accommodation was still insufficient and enrolments had to be limited. In 1890 new classrooms in a separate building on the northern boundary were erected. The enrolments in 1892 was 1,720 pupils.

Many Jewish children attended Crown Street Public School and in 1896, Banks wrote an account on the instructions given in the Jewish religion. It stated that for the past sixteen years instruction on the Jewish religion had been carried out in the school. At the time of the account "two Hebrew teachers, specially employed by the Jewish persuasion, attend, attend for an hour each forenoon, and so arrange their classes that every Hebrew child receives two hours" instruction per week.'

In 1897 a two-storey building containing two classrooms on the first floor and weather sheds underneath was erected towards the rear of the site. This building was enlarged so as to produce an infants school of eight classrooms in 1911. Substantial interior remodelling of the main building, discussed since 1906, was finally carried out in 1924 and a new manual training building near the southern building was also erected.

Secondary education was available at Crown Street from 1881 to 1960. The school was made a Superior Public School from 1881, and from 1913 to 1947 the school had a boys' commercial secondary department and a girls domestic science department from 1913 to 1928. From 1929 to 1960 a girls' intermediate high school operated.

== Description ==
A large two-storey school building in Gothic Revival style. The walls are face brick on sandstone foundations and featuring stone dressing around windows and sills, cornices and finely detailed parapet cappings. The walls contain excellent brick detailing. The plan is asymmetrical. The dominant feature is a centrally placed three storey tower roofed with a fine metal roofed spire. The roof over the main building is steeply pitched in a form similar to a mansard roof and is sheeted with corrugated metal.

The building is dramatically sited on a small hill above Crown Street and in the grounds is a small cenotaph in the Anzac tradition dedicated to the former school pupils. A series of stone terraces and steps connects this to the street entrances marked by well crafted stone and iron fences.

=== Condition ===
As at 1 October 1997, the physical condition is good. Archaeological potential is medium.

=== Modifications and dates ===
- 1869 – built
- 1897 – additions

== Heritage listing ==
As at 1 October 1997, Crown Street Public School is a major part of Surry Hills' early development as a city workers' housing estate. The school buildings reflect the rapid growth of Darlinghurst and Surry Hills as residential area in the 1860s to 1880s. It is a large Victorian public school building of excellent architectural quality and siting which provides much interest to the townscape of Crown Street and as a focus for other 19th century buildings in the area.

Crown Street Public School was listed on the New South Wales State Heritage Register on 2 April 1999 having satisfied the following criteria.

The place is important in demonstrating the course, or pattern, of cultural or natural history in New South Wales.

It is a major part of Surry Hills' early development as a city workers' housing estate. The school buildings reflect the rapid growth of Darlinghurst and Surry Hills as residential area in the 1860s to 1880s.

The place is important in demonstrating aesthetic characteristics and/or a high degree of creative or technical achievement in New South Wales.

It is a large Victorian public school building of excellent architectural quality and siting which provides much interest to the townscape of Crown Street and as a focus for other 19th century buildings in the area.

== Notable people ==
Notable people associated with the school include:

- Eric Harrison, student – Australian politician and diplomat
- Tas Jones, student – swimmer, diver, rugby union player, rugby league player
- Victor Trumper, student – Australian cricketer
- Xenia Goodwin, student – Australian dancer and actress

== See also ==
- List of public schools in Sydney
