= Tasman Jones =

Australian sportsman (1893-1936)

Tas Jones
- Born: Henry Tasman Jones; 7 April 1893; Launceston, Tasmania
- Died: December 1936 (aged 42–43)
- Other names: Tasman Jones
- Known for: swimmer, diver

Tasman (Tas) Jones (1893 – 1936) was an Australian sportsman, well known as a swimmer and a diver. He also played water polo, rugby union, and rugby league.

== Early life and education ==
Henry Tasman Jones, at age fourteen

Jones was born Henry Tasman Jones on 7 April 1893 at Launceston. He went by the diminutive given name Tas, which he also used in legal matters.

Jones attended the Crown Street Superior Public School. As a teenager he showed talent in swimming.

By 1906 Jones was winning handicap races, 45 yards school competition, starting from scratch, Winning again over 50 yards. At the age of 14 he won the 60 yards championship at Crown Street Superior Public School.

Jones was required to "swim off" to split dead heat eligibility to compete in inter school events at above his age, and missing out, still winning at age level.

Two decades later, Jones' swimming performance at school was still a benchmark for competitiveness for others.

== Adult life ==
Jones devised a scoring method for diving, adopted in December 1914, using standardised tabulated forms which took account of diving elements, including approach, deportment, and entry. His method was considered simple for judging and broadly satisfactory, but it did not account for the degree of difficulty of the dive.

Jones was respected as a "never failing volunteer" for sporting demonstrations for "good causes".

He managed the Spit Baths from 1918 to 1922. His knowledge of and experience in the provision of swimming bath facilities was called upon by others.

Jones was involved in water rescues, saving one life.

His profile was such that he was used to endorse products in advertising.

Jones died December 1936.

His death left his widow in difficult circumstances and the Spit Club raised funding to assist her, known as the Tas Jones Memorial Fund.

== Outreach ==
As well as performing in demonstration diving and swimming events, Jones took a keen interest in the administration, development, and support of others in sport.

Jones was a vice-captain for the East Sydney Club, and a handicapper for the club.

He was the inaugural president of the Spit Club, and its swimming coach. and later the president of the gentlemen's section of the club.

Jones coached individual diving, and individual swimming, and he was the inaugural coach of the Balmoral Amateur Swimming Club.

Jones would sponsor sporting achievements, some included the 50 yard swim trophy for the East Sydney Amateur Club, the Spit Club diving trophy, and the North Sydney rugby league club trophy for most consistent forward.

== Swimming ==
Jones was referred to as a "star sprinter".

== Diving ==
Tas Jones executing a dive.

Jones had a diving reputation in 1912.

He frequently led diver teams in demonstration events. and was considered a diving veteran.

== Water polo ==
In 1909 Jones played water polo second grade for East Sydney. And later played water polo at state championships.

He was sought by the [amateur] Randwick and Coogee water polo team in 1931 but was regarded as professional. While Jones had never competed as a professional he had managed the Spit Baths and taught children to swim for fees.

== Rugby union ==
Jones played second grade for the Eastern Sydney rugby league club from 1912 to 1914.

He moved to first grade in 1914 in fullback and three-quarter positions.

Jones also played in seven-a-side competition for Eastern Suburbs as a back.

== Rugby league ==
Jones played first grade for the North Sydney rugby league club.

He started playing rugby league, for Eastern Suburbs, in a pre-season game, but was under disqualification from rugby union. Jones was observed to be a bit hazy on the rule differences between league ad union. Jones played at halfback for Eastern Suburbs first grade opening game of the season against Annandale.

In 1919 Jones played for North Sydney.
