= Australian Cervical Cancer Foundation =

Australian nonprofit organisation

- Abbreviation: ACCF
- Founded: November 2, 2007; 18 years ago
- Founders: Mike Willie; Lenore Willie
- Founded at: Melbourne, Australia
- Type: NGO
- Legal status: charity
- Region served: Australia; Asia
- Director: Terry Mulcahy
- Chief Financial Officer: Barb Tasker
- National Health Promotion Manager: Elizabeth Ham
- Chair: Jade Demnar
- Website: accf.org.au

Australian Cervical Cancer Foundation (ACCF) is a nonprofit organisation that spreads awareness about cervical cancer in women and young girls. The organisation claims to be the only dedicated cervical cancer charity in Australia with responsibility to provide awareness, education and support to the Australian people and in developing countries. The organisation was found in early 2007 as part of women awareness. As part of its main objectives, it facilitates programs that increase awareness about the prevention, screening and treatment of cervical cancer, as well as providing resources that support women to take care of their health. It also works in collaboration with Aboriginal and Torres Strait Islander communities to address issues of high rates of cervical cancer.

== History ==
The organisation was found in the 2007 when Mike and Lenore Willie purchased HPV vaccines. Later, they contacted the Australian Embassy in Nepal, and travelled to Kathmandu where they vaccinated the first Nepalese girls against HPV. This led to the formation of the organisation.

Since then, the organization has been providing HPV vaccine freely to all school-aged girls and boys. Eligible Australians of all races can also access the Cervical screening test (formerly the Pap test or Pap smear) in all of its centres. The organisation is available in most of Australian states such as New South Wales, Northern Territory, Queensland, South Australia, Tasmania, Victoria and Western Australia. It has also spread to other countries such as Bhutan and Nepal.

=== In Australia ===
In Australia alone, the ACCF claims to have visited over 733 schools and community presentations to more than 76,771 people. It donated more than $10,000 to 18 families as part of the Orange Hearts Bursary Program. Since 2014, the organisation has been conducting campaigns to communities across Australia through Cervical Cancer Awareness Week.

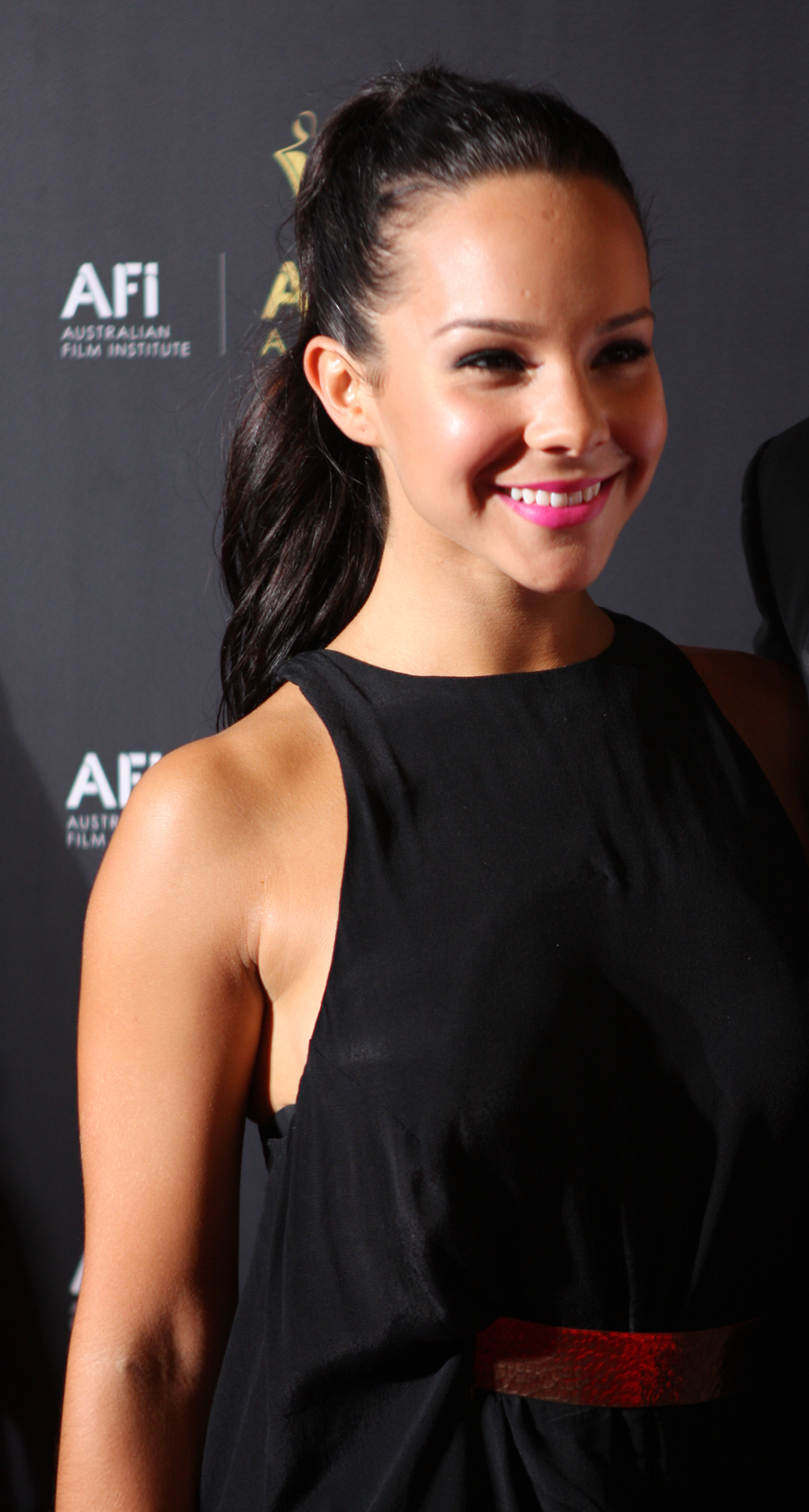
Dena Kaplan an ambassador of the organisation

==== Orange Hearts Bursary Program ====
Orange Hearts Bursary Program is a program in collaboration with Hyundai Help for Kids to help alleviate financial problems to patients of cervical cancer in Australian families. The program provides 10 x $500 bursaries to children of 18 years and under from families who are facing a diagnosis of cervical cancer. The funded money is used to cover the costs of resources such as schoolbooks and stationery as well as aiming at giving children joy and hope.

=== In developing countries ===
The organisation has supported projects and clinics to deliver vaccination for HPV, cervical screening, and treatment of cervical cancer in countries such as Nepal, Bhutan, Vietnam, The Solomon Islands, Vanuatu, Kiribati, Philippines, and Papua New Guinea. It also provides on-the-ground civic education and work in collaboration with local organisations.

== Objectives ==
The organization facilitates and implements programs designed to provide awareness about vaccination, screening and treatments for cervical cancer, cervical abnormalities and HPV-related cancers. It also ensures and encourages effective changes which produce life-saving results to improve women's health outcomes as well as contributing to empowering women, reducing their poverty and disadvantage. It partners with governments, organisations and individuals that have same interests.
