= One More Shot (2025 film) =

2025 Australian fantasy comedy film by Nicholas Clifford

- Promotional release poster
- Directed by: Nicholas Clifford
- Screenplay by: Alice Foulcher; Gregory Erdstein
- Produced by: Virginia Whitwell; Jim Wright; Elise Trenorden; Nick Batzias
- Starring: Emily Browning; Aisha Dee; Sean Keenan; Pallavi Sharda; Ashley Zukerman
- Cinematography: Simon Ozolins
- Edited by: Julie-Anne De Ruvo
- Music by: Justin Stanley
- Production companies: Stan; GoodThing Productions; Truce Films
- Distributed by: ONE12 Productions
- Release dates: March 7, 2025 (SXSW); October 12, 2025 (Stan)
- Running time: 91 minutes
- Country: Australia
- Language: English

One More Shot is a 2025 Australian time-loop comedy directed by Nicholas Clifford and written by Alice Foulcher and Gregory Erdstein. The film stars Emily Browning.

On New Year's Eve of 1999, Minnie Vernon discovers a bottle of time traveling tequila. Each shot takes her back to the start of the night, giving her a bottle's worth of shots to win back her old flame Joe and change the course of her millennium life.

It had its world premiere at the 2025 SXSW Film Festival and was released on Stan on October 12, 2025.

== Plot ==
On New Year's Eve 1999, Minnie Vernon is in her mid-30s. A hospital anaesthesiologist, she sees her ex-fiancé Cameron, who is there for the birth of his first child. Cameron reminds Minnie that they broke up because she slept with her old boyfriend, Joe.

Minnie is invited by friends Flick and Max to attend a New Year's Eve party at the home of their mutual friend Rodney. She agrees to go when she realizes that Joe will be there. Also attending are Rodney's wife Pia, an IT worker who is worried about Y2K, and Rodney's boorish coworker C-word.

Minnie is given a bottle of rare tequila and takes a sip of it before the party to steady her nerves. At the party, Minnie is shocked to discover that Joe has brought his free spirited American girlfriend Jenny.

When Minnie injures her nose walking into a glass door, Joe tends to her wound. The two reminisce about old times, and Joe leans in to kiss Minnie but stops. Minnie then tries to kiss him, but Joe pulls back. Later he proposes to Jenny. At midnight, the lights go out, but it turns out to be a prank by Rodney, which angers Pia. Disappointed in how the night has gone, Minnie takes a swig of the tequila and finds herself back at the beginning of the night. Realizing that the tequila allows her to travel back in time, Minnie decides to try and rekindle her relationship with Joe.

However, repeated attempts end in failure, often with Minnie injured or people mad at one another. During her multiple tries, Minnie discovers that Pia is overwhelmed in her role as a new mother, Joe is a recovering alcoholic, and Jenny is pregnant with Joe's child.

In yet another iteration, Minnie lies down shortly after arriving. She wakes directly after Rodney pranks Pia via the Y2K bug and the proposal. When Jenny reveals her pregnancy, Minnie "loses it," then discovers that no one wants her there.

Dejected, Mia begins acting more recklessly in another loop, including throwing away Rodney and Pia's life savings, which Pia had withdrawn from the bank in case they failed. When Rodney confronts Minnie he recognizes the bottle of tequila and demands to know where she got it. Realizing the Rodney knows about the time travel, Minnie takes another swig and confronts him about it.

Rodney shows Minnie his own nearly empty bottle of tequila, explaining that he got it a decade earlier, on vacation in Mexico, and that he has used its powers several times to improve his life, including to pass his medical exams. As the tequila takes him back to when he first used it, ten years ago, he has refrained from using it since the birth of his daughter so as not to erase her from existence.

This time, Minnie tries to act more responsibly, but when Rodney pulls his prank at midnight, Pia storms off. Convinced that Pia intends to leave him, Rodney convinces Minnie to use her last two shots of tequila so they can both travel back to the beginning of the night.

Finally in the last timeline, Minnie decides to right many of her wrongs.

This time, Joe smashes into the sliding door so Minnie looks after him in the bathroom. They reconcile, sealing it with a kiss but Jenny catches them. Minnie tells the group about the tequila and offers to eat the worm in order to fix Joe's relationship with Jenny. However, she reconsiders and instead advises Joe patch things up and live with the consequences. As midnight approaches, Joe reconciles with Jenny and proposes.

In the morning, all of the old friends and their partners are enjoying themselves. C-Word, having always been in the background, swallows the worm and disappears definitively.

== Cast ==
- Emily Browning as Minnie Vernon
- Aisha Dee as Jenny
- Sean Keenan as Joe
- Pallavi Sharda as Pia
- Ashley Zukerman as Rodney
- Hamish Michael as C-Word
- Anna McGahan as Flick
- Contessa Treffone as Max
- Jane Allsop as Lynne

== Production ==
The film is directed by Nicholas Clifford. The script is from Alice Foulcher and Gregory Erdstein, with Virginia Whitwell and Nick Batzias producing for GoodThing Productions, alongside Truce Films' Jim Wright and Elise Trenorden. Protagonist Pictures joined the project in February 2025.

The cast is led by Emily Browning and also includes Aisha Dee, Sean Keenan, Pallavi Sharda and Ashley Zukerman.

Principal photography took place in Victoria, Australia, and was completed by early 2025.

== Release ==
The film had its world premiere at the 2025 SXSW Film Festival. It also featured at the 2025 Melbourne International Film Festival. The film was released on Stan on October 12, 2025.

== Reception ==
On the review aggregator website Rotten Tomatoes, 70% of 20 critics' reviews are positive.

On Screen Anarchy, Peter Martin calling it "an entirely satisfying experience" and describied Emily Browning performance as "effervescent". On The Guardian, Luke Buckmaster rated it 3/5 stars, writing that "there's nothing tremendously exciting or distinctive about One More Shot – but (...) It’s pleasantly derivative."

== Awards ==
Emily Browning was nominated for the 2026 AACTA Award for Best Lead Actress in Film.

Writers Alice Foulcher and Gregory Erdstein were nominated by the Australian Writers' Guild at the 58th AWGIE Awards for Best Original Feature script.

Natalie Wall was nominated at the 2025 Casting Guild of Australia Awards for Best Casting in a Feature.

== See also ==
- Year 2000 problem
- List of films featuring time loops
- List of comedy films of the 2020s
