= Dance Academy =

Australian television series and film adaptation

- Genre: Teen drama
- Created by: Samantha Strauss; Joanna Werner
- Starring: Xenia Goodwin; Alicia Banit; Dena Kaplan; Thom Green; Jordan Rodrigues; Tim Pocock; Isabel Durant; Thomas Lacey; Keiynan Lonsdale; Tara Morice
- Opening theme: "My Chance" by The White Rhinos
- Composer: Bryony Marks
- Country of origin: Australia
- Original language: English
- No. of series: 3
- No. of episodes: 65 (list of episodes)

Production
- Executive producers: Bernadette O'Mahony; Joanna Werner
- Producer: Joanna Werner
- Cinematography: Martin McGrath
- Camera setup: Multiple-camera setup
- Running time: 24–25 minutes
- Production companies: Werner Film Productions; ZDF Enterprises; ACTF

Original release
- Network: ABC1 / ABC3 (Australia)
- Release: 31 May 2010 – 30 September 2013

Dance Academy is an Australian teen drama television series produced by Werner Film Productions in association with the Australian Broadcasting Corporation and ZDF. Series 1 premiered on 31 May 2010, and series 2 began airing on 12 March 2012. Series 3 premiered on ABC3 on 8 July 2013 in Australia.

The television drama lasted 3 series with 65 episodes. A film sequel to the television series, Dance Academy: The Movie was released by StudioCanal in Australian cinemas on 6 April 2017.

== Plot ==
Dance Academy is narrated mainly from the perspective of Tara Webster (Xenia Goodwin), a newly accepted 1st year student at the National Academy of Dance in Sydney, which also doubles as a Year 10–12 high school for the dancers. Throughout the series, she learns to better her ballet technique, as well as learn contemporary ballet and hip-hop dance, while creating lifelong friendships and experiencing many hardships. In the first series, Tara soon befriends fellow students Kat (Alicia Banit) and Ethan Karamakov (Tim Pocock), Sammy Lieberman (Thom Green), Abigail Armstrong (Dena Kaplan) and Christian Reed (Jordan Rodrigues), as well as eventually getting to know her teacher Ms. Raine (Tara Morice).

Series 2 sees Tara return to the academy for her second year with the hope of representing Australia in an international ballet competition, the Prix de Fonteyn. This series introduces new students Grace Whitney (Isabel Durant), Ben Tickle (Thomas Lacey), Ollie Lloyd (Keiynan Lonsdale), as well as teachers Saskia Duncan (Brooke Harman), and Zach, and sees the characters react to an unexpected death.

Series 3 follows the characters in their final year at the academy as they compete for a contract in the dance company. Grace and Tara obtain temporary spots in the corps de ballet, Kat stars in a dance film, Abigail and Ollie explore commercial dancing and singing, and the 3rd years go on tour for a contemporary version of Romeo and Juliet throughout regional Australia.

== Episodes ==
| Series | Episodes | Originally released | |
| Series | Episodes | First released | Last released |
|---|---|---|---|
| 1 | 26 | 31 May 2010 | 5 July 2010 |
| 2 | 26 | 12 March 2012 | 24 April 2012 |
| 3 | 13 | 8 July 2013 | 30 September 2013 |

== Cast ==
The six main characters from series one, clockwise from left: Kat, Ethan, Sammy, Abigail, Tara and Christian

| Actor | Character | Series | | | Film |
| Actor | Character | 1 | 2 | 3 | Film |
|---|---|---|---|---|---|
| Xenia Goodwin | Tara Webster | Main | Main | Main | Starring |
| Alicia Banit | Kat Karamakov | Main | Main | Main | Starring |
| Dena Kaplan | Abigail Armstrong | Main | Main | Main | Starring |
| Thom Green | Sammy Lieberman | Main | Main | | |
| Jordan Rodrigues | Christian Reed | Main | Main | Main | Starring |
| Tim Pocock | Ethan Karamakov | Main | Main | | |
| Tara Morice | Mrs. Lucinda Raine | Recurring | Recurring | Recurring | Starring |
| Thomas Lacey | Ben Tickle | | Main | Main | Starring |
| Isabel Durant | Grace Whitney | | Main | Main | |
| Keiynan Lonsdale | Ollie Lloyd | | Recurring | Main | Starring |

== Production ==
Dance Academy is produced by Joanna Werner's film company Werner Films Productions in association with the Australian Broadcasting Corporation, Screen Australia, Film Victoria, Film New South Wales and ZDF for Germany. As of August 2012, airing rights to Dance Academy have been sold to 180 territories, airing on every continent except Antarctica.

=== Casting and filming ===
==== Series 1 (2010) ====
Casting for series one began in early 2009 in Brisbane, Melbourne and Sydney. All cast members had to be skilled in drama and dancing and had to cope with Australia's best choreographers. Filming began on 13 July 2009 and wrapped up in early November. The series premiere was originally planned for a mid-2010 premiere on ABC3, however, like Dead Gorgeous, the premiere was pushed to ABC1 on 31 May 2010 and ABC3 on 6 June 2010. The first series premiered on Germany's ZDF on 26 September 2010.

==== Series 2 (2012) ====
Production of series two was officially green-lit by ABC and ZDF on 2 July 2010. Casting calls were issued on 14 September 2010, and principal photography in Sydney took place between 31 January and 4 August 2011. Episodes were directed by Ian Watson, Daniel Nettheim, Lynn-Maree Danzey, Ian Gilmour, and Michael James Rowland.

Series two premiered on ABC3 on 12 March 2012 and ran for 26 episodes, airing each week from Monday through Thursday, ending on 24 April.

==== Series 3 (2013) ====
Screen Australia approved investment funding for a third series of 13 episodes on 5 December 2011. Filming began 27 August 2012, and ended on 27 November 2012. On 5 June 2013, Alicia Banit and Thomas Lacey appeared on ABC3's Studio 3 to announce the series 3 premiere on 8 July 2013.

== Release ==
=== Online streaming ===
The show is available on streaming sites, including Hulu.com and Amazon.com. Entire episodes of all three series are also available, for free, on the show's official YouTube channel outside of Australia.

=== DVD releases ===
The Australian Broadcasting Corporation has released all episodes from series one through three on DVD—with series one and two across four volumes and series three over two—as well as series collections and a complete series one to three compilation.

| Title | Region 4 release date | Episodes |
|---|---|---|
| Dance Academy – Learning to Fly | 1 July 2010 | 1. "Learning to Fly, Part 1", 2. "Week Zero", 3. "Behind Barres", 4. "Minefield", 5. "Real Men Don't Dance" |
| Dance Academy – Growing Pains | 2 September 2010 | 6. "Perfection", 7. "Crush Test Dummies", 8. "Growing Pains", 9. "Heartbeat", 10. "Through the Looking Glass", 11. "One Perfect Day", 12. "Pressure" |
| Dance Academy – Turning Pointe | 2 September 2010 | 13. "Family", 14. "Turning Pointes", 15. "My Life En Pointe", 16. "Free Falling", 17. "A Midsummer's Night's Dream", 18. "Betty Bunheads", 19. "Fairest and Best" |
| Dance Academy – Ballet Fever | 7 October 2010 | 20. "Ballet Fever", 21. "FOMO: Fear of Missing Out", 22. "Flight or Fight Response", 23. "BFF: Best Friends Forever", 24. "Heatwave", 25. "The Deep End", 26. "Learning to Fly, Part 2" |
| Dance Academy – The Complete First Series | 2 December 2010 | All 26 episodes from series one. |
| Dance Academy – Raising the Barre | 5 April 2012 | 27. "In the Middle, Somewhat Elevated", 28. "Dreamlife", 29. "Faux Pas de Deux", 30. "Legends", 31. "Showcase", 32. "Like No One's Watching" |
| Dance Academy – Breaking Pointe | 3 May 2012 | 33. "A Choreographed Life", 34. "Connectivity", 35. "The Break", 36. "A Good Life", 37. "Self Sabotage", 38. "Breaking Pointe" |
| Dance Academy – Catch Me If I Fall | 7 June 2012 | 39. "Backstab", 40. "Rescue Mission", 41. "Moving On", 42. "Origins", 43. "Love and War", 44. "Catch Me If I Fall", 45. "The Nationals" |
| Dance Academy – Win or Lose | 7 June 2012 | 46. "Tick, Question Mark, Cross", 47. "Ladder Theory", 48. "Win or Lose", 49. "Love It or Fight It", 50. "The Prix De Fonteyn", 51. "The Second", 52. "The Red Shoes" |
| Dance Academy – The Complete Second Series | 7 November 2012 | All 26 episodes from series two. |
| Dance Academy – New Rules | 4 September 2013 | 53. "Glue", 54. "New Rules", 55. "Second Chances", 56. "Short Cut Clause", 57. "Negative Patterns", 58. "Fake It Until You Make It" |
| Dance Academy – The Ultimate Test | 2 October 2013 | 59. "Graceland", 60. "Traveling Light", 61. "Don't Let Me Down Gently", 62. "N'Fektd", 63. "Start of an Era", 64. "The Perfect Storm", 65. "Not for Nothing" |
| Dance Academy – The Complete Third Series | 6 November 2013 | All 13 episodes from series three. |

== Awards ==
| Ceremony | Award | Nominee | Result |
|---|---|---|---|
| 2010 AWGIE Awards | Children's Television: C Classification | "Growing Pains" by Sarah Lambert | Nominated |
| 2010 AWGIE Awards | Children's Television: C Classification | "Turning Pointes" by Greg Waters | Nominated |
| 2010 Australian Directors Guild Awards | Best Direction in a Television Children's Program | "Behind Barres" by Jeffrey Walker | Won |
| 2010 AFI Awards | Best Direction in Television | Jeffrey Walker for "Week Zero" | Nominated |
| 2010 AFI Awards | Best Children's Television Drama | Dance Academy | Nominated |
| 2011 Kidscreen Awards | Best Companion Website | Dance Academy | Won |
| 2011 TV Week Logie Awards | Most Outstanding Children's Program | Dance Academy | Won |
| 2011 Seoul International Drama Awards | Best TV Drama | Dance Academy | Nominated |
| 2011 International Emmy Awards | Children and Young People | Dance Academy | Nominated |
| 2011 Asian Television Awards | Best Children's Programme | "Learning to Fly, Part 2" by Samantha Strauss | Nominated |
| 2011 Hugo Television Awards | Children's Series | Dance Academy, Series 2 | Won |
| 2011 Banff World Media Festival | Youth Programs (13+) – Fiction | "Week Zero" by Samantha Strauss | Nominated |
| 2012 AACTA Awards | Best Children's Television Series | Dance Academy Series 2 | Nominated |
| 2013 TV Week Logie Awards | Most Outstanding Children's Program | Dance Academy | Won |
| 2014 TV Week Logie Awards | Most Outstanding Children's Program | Dance Academy | Nominated |

== Books ==
ABC Books has released seven paperback novels, each based on a particular episode and from the perspective of a single character. The books are published by ABC Books and HarperCollins Australia.

- Costain, Meredith (2010). Dance Academy: Tara: Learning to Fly. ABC Books. ISBN 978-0-7333-2894-7.
- Bouchet, Bruno (2010). Dance Academy: Sammy: Real Men Don't Dance. ABC Books. ISBN 978-0-7333-2879-4.
- Scott, Sebastian (2010). Dance Academy: Christian: Behind Barres. ABC Books. ISBN 978-0-7333-2897-8.
- Bouchet, Bruno (2010). Dance Academy: Kat: Anywhere but Here. ABC Books. ISBN 978-0-7333-2895-4.
- Elliot, Rachel (2010). Dance Academy: Abigail: Through the Looking Glass. ABC Books. ISBN 978-0-7333-2896-1.
- Costain, Meredith (2012). Dance Academy: Tara: Everything to Lose. ABC Books. ISBN 978-0-7304-9708-0.
- Bouchet, Bruno (2012). Dance Academy: Abigail: Nice Girls Finish Last. ABC Books. ISBN 978-0-7333-3001-8.

== Film: Dance Academy: The Movie ==
On 22 April 2015, a feature film adaption of Dance Academy was announced along with other feature film projects to have received funding from Screen Australia. The film is a sequel to the television series, set 18 months after the events of series three, and follows Tara's journey as she pursues her dream to become a ballerina star. Pre-production for the film, then titled Dance Academy: The Comeback, began on 17 April 2016. Shooting for the film began on 29 May 2016, and wrapped on 22 July. The official trailer for the film was released on 25 December 2016. The film, retitled Dance Academy: The Movie, was released by StudioCanal to Australian cinemas on 6 April 2017. It was released internationally on Netflix under the title Dance Academy: The Comeback.

== Plot ==
20-year-old Tara's life is noticeably adrift. 18 months after the life-changing injury that occurred in the penultimate episode of the TV series, she finds herself taking a college writing class and working as a waitress in the Sydney Opera House, while her former dance rival and current roommate Abigail enjoys a place as a promising dancer in the National Ballet Company. Her best friend Katrina Karamakov is now a successful children's television performer in New York while her close friend Ben Tickle is a principal for the Austin Ballet. Tara's boyfriend Christian is teaching dance to young children, and he asks a delighted Tara to move in with him.

Tara is in the process of suing the National Ballet for negligence in causing her injury. She stands to win close to a million dollars in compensation thanks to compelling evidence in the form of a personal testimonial provided by Tara's former ballet teacher Ms Raine. However, after being casually invited to audition by the company's artistic director, Madeline, Tara drops the court case and begins training. When her audition proves unsuccessful, she is convinced by Kat to take a trip to New York City and stay with her. Tara plans to spend the trip auditioning for dance companies. Christian disapproves of her plan and he ends their relationship shortly after she arrives in New York.

Tara and Kat have a happy reunion at first, but they have a falling out when Tara expresses concerns about Kat's lifestyle and mocks her current boyfriend. Tara also runs into another former Academy classmate, Ollie, who has been auditioning unsuccessfully for a long time and shows her the rigors of trying to "make it" as a dancer.

Tara leaves New York to stay with Ms Raine and her husband Marcus at their ranch in Austin. She hopes for an audition at Marcus' Austin Ballet, but Ms Raine pushes her to reevaluate her goals. Ben is also staying at the ranch, and Tara learns that his leukemia has returned. He is under strict instructions to avoid exertion, although he longs to dance. In defiance, Ben and Tara secretly create a contemporary dance on the theme of "Orpheus and Persephone" for the upcoming Fringe Festival, and they enter the festival as choreographers under the amalgamation "Benstara".

After successfully performing in the festival, Tara again encounters Madeline who has brought the company on tour to New York. After seeing Tara dance, Madeline offers her a place in the corps de ballet as another dancer has pulled out due to injuries. Having achieved her dream, Tara finds life in the corps demanding and unfulfilling. She ultimately leaves a performance after receiving a call from a distraught Ollie, who has replaced Tara as dancer in "Benstara" and as Ben's carer, telling her that Ben has collapsed and is in hospital.

Tara resigns from the company and reunites with Kat and Christian, who has flown in from Australia to tell her that he misses her. Inspired by Tara's rebellion, Abigail takes Tara's original place in the fringe performance despite her active contract with the National Ballet Company whilst Tara and Christian watch from the wings.

Back in Sydney, the friends watch and participate in a high-energy performance by Christian's dance students at the Samuel Lieberman Centre. Having realised her new ambition to become a choreographer, Tara maps out her plans for her next piece in the journal she receives from Christian, confidently predicting, "this next part is going to be amazing", presumably referring not only to the dance but their future together.
