= That's Not Me (film) =

- Directed by: Gregory Erdstein
- Screenplay by: Gregory Erdstein; Alice Foulcher
- Produced by: Gregory Erdstein; Alice Foulcher; Anna Kojevnikov; Sally Storey
- Starring: Alice Foulcher; Isabel Lucas; Richard Davies
- Cinematography: Shelley Farthing-Dawe
- Edited by: Ariel Shaw
- Music by: Nicholas Pollock
- Release date: 2017
- Running time: 85 mins
- Country: Australia
- Box office: AU $44,000

That's Not Me is a 2017 Australian independent comedy film directed by Gregory Erdstein. It was filmed between 2015 and 2016 in Melbourne, Australia, and Los Angeles, US. The screenplay was written by Gregory Erdstein and lead actress Alice Foulcher. That's Not Me had its world premiere in February 2017 at the Santa Barbara International Film Festival and its Australian premiere in June 2017 at the Sydney Film Festival. It was released theatrically at selected cinemas across Australia in September 2017. In 2020 That's Not Me was nominated for the AACTA Byron Kennedy Award, as one of the top 12 indie feature films of the past decade.

== Synopsis ==
Acting has been Polly's dream since childhood. However, she constantly refuses to play the characters she considers disgusting. Amy, her twin sister, agrees to act any part offered to her. And since Amy works hard, she achieves popularity. Due to Amy's popularity, people confuse Polly for her all the time.

Envious of her sister's success, Polly starts to impersonate her in order to get all the freebies that accompany fame.

Polly decides to throw her job in and head for Hollywood for pilots season castings. Disappointed that she has turned up at the wrong time of year, she spends some time catching up with her actress friend Zoe. Zoe gives Polly a good dose of reality in that "all that glitters is not gold".

== Cast ==
- Alice Foulcher as Polly / Amy Cuthbert
- Isabel Lucas as Zoe Cooper
- Richard Davies as Jack Campbell
- Belinda Misevski as Ariel
- Rowan Davie as Oliver Brook
- Andrew S. Gilbert as Stephen Cuthbert
- Catherine Hill as Diane Cuthbert
- Steve Mouzakis as Anthony
- Janine Watson as Patricia Clarke
- Lloyd Allison-Young as Simon
- Andrew O'Keefe as John Davidson
- Christopher Kirby as Cameron
- Benjamin Rigby as Evan (casting director)
- Ming-Zhu Hii as Corrie (director)
- Arthur Angel as Nick (producer)
- Paul Ashcroft as Mars
- Sue Jones as Virginia (cinema patron)

== Reception ==
=== Critical response ===
That's Not Me has been met with positive reviews. On the review aggregator website Rotten Tomatoes, 90% of 20 critics' reviews are positive, with an average rating of 6.1/10.

Luke Buckmaster of The Guardian gave the film four stars, writing "An outstanding performance from emerging actor Alice Foulcher takes this lean and plucky film about stymied ambition to another level. A young and spunky cast and crew have installed in this smart and sassy dramedy a highly disciplined, tonally cohesive style. It is refreshing to see that kind of storytelling discipline particularly from a first-time film-maker."

Junkee Media called the film "an emotionally resonant and comedic quarter life crisis… It’s a simple set-up delivered endlessly in comedy, but managed so well in That's Not Me that you remember how rare it is that balance is achieved in Australian films." The Sydney Arts Guide praised the film and performances, writing: "There’s not a dud note in That's Not Me thanks to a solid foundation in a script by Alice Foulcher and Gregory Erdstein, and anchored by a winning lead performance by Foulcher and helmed with an assured hand by Erdstein. The support casting is impeccable…Isabel Lucas is ferociously good". Jake Watt of Switch called the film "a marvel of indie ingenuity, with dollops of charm and confident direction." Karl Quinn writing for The Age said the film is "bursting with comedy, humanity and interesting ideas", the Huffington Post called it "a stunning exploration of identity, the industry and the thirst for fame…the perfect blend of comedy and tragedy”, whilst Concrete Playground praised it as "earnest, astute, insightful and thoroughly amusing. This is a movie that is both universal and unmistakably Australian – and that’s just one of many delicate balancing acts that That’s Not Me achieves".

Louise of Urban Cinefile writes that "Foulcher is a knockout. She is unselfconscious and instantly likeable. Sibling rivalry, celebrity and chasing dreams have never been so much fun in this energetic, uplifting character-driven comedy that soars as surely as the trajectory of its irresistible star”. Time Out gave the film four stars, with critic Nick Dent writing "Alice Foulcher deserves to be a lock for Best Actress [for the 2017 AACTA awards]. [She] conveys low self-esteem with the comedic flair of a Kristin Wiig." Andy Howell of Ain't It Cool writes “[Alice Foulcher] shoulders all the drama and gives one of the best twin performances I’ve ever seen... Having nuanced drama embedded in a comedy is a tightrope walk, but she’s got the skills to land it.” Leigh Paatsch of the Herald Sun gave the film a positive review, noting "a wonderful performance by Foulcher in a deceptively demanding role". Film Alert 101 suggests that Foulcher "may well be the comic talent of her age", and radio station 2ser 107.3 describes her as "absolutely superb throughout".

The film was also flagged by the Santa Barbara Independent as a Must-See Pick of the Santa Barbara International Film Festival, and sold out a number of sessions at the festival.

=== Accolades ===
At the 2017 Sydney Film Festival That's Not Me came fourth at the Foxtel Movies Audience Awards and ninth in the Top 10 Audience Awards at the 2017 Melbourne International Film Festival. Alice Foulcher received a Best Actress nomination at the 2018 Australian Film Critics Association awards< for her performance in the film. That's Not Me won the award for Best Film Under $200k at the inaugural 2018 Ozflix Independent Film Awards. The film was ranked #5 of The Guardian's Top 10 Australian Films of 2017. In 2020 That's Not Me was nominated for the AACTA Byron Kennedy Award, as one of the top 12 indie feature films of the past decade.
