= Gregory Erdstein =

Australian film director and writer

- Education: Victorian College of the Arts
- Occupations: Director, writer
- Known for: That’s Not Me (2017); One More Shot (2025)
- Spouse: Alice Foulcher

Gregory Erdstein is an Australian film director and screenwriter, best known for the Australian feature films That's Not Me (2017) and One More Shot (2025).

== Career ==
Erdstein has collaborated with his wife, actress/writer Alice Foulcher, on several films including feature films That's Not Me and One More Shot, and short films Picking up at Auschwitz, the Tropfest finalist short A Bit Rich and Paris Syndrome.

In 2014 co-wrote and co-directed the short film Two Devils, with Van Diemen's Land director Jonathan auf der Heide. It premiered at the 2014 Melbourne International Film Festival.

In 2015 Erdstein commenced production on his debut feature, That's Not Me, which filmed in Melbourne, Australia and Los Angeles, USA. The film had its world premiere in February 2017 at the Santa Barbara International Film Festival, and Australian premiere in June 2017 at the Sydney Film Festival - where it came fourth at the Foxtel Movies Audience Awards. That's Not Me was met with overwhelmingly positive reviews and a Rotten Tomatoes approval rating of 87%. The Guardian ranked it #5 of the Top 10 Australian Films of 2017, with critic Luke Buckmaster giving it a 4 star review. Junkee Media called the film "An emotionally resonant and comedic quarter life crisis… It’s a simple set-up delivered endlessly in comedy, but managed so well in That's Not Me that you remember how rare it is that balance is achieved in Australian films." The Sydney Arts Guide praised the film and performances, writing: "There’s not a dud note in That's Not Me thanks to a solid foundation in a script by Alice Foulcher and Gregory Erdstein, and anchored by a winning lead performance by Foulcher and helmed with an assured hand by Erdstein". Jake Watt of Switch called the film "a marvel of indie ingenuity, with dollops of charm and confident direction." Karl Quinn writing for The Age said the film was "bursting with comedy, humanity and interesting ideas", the Huffington Post called it "a stunning exploration of identity, the industry and the thirst for fame…the perfect blend of comedy and tragedy", whilst Concrete Playground praised it as "earnest, astute, insightful and thoroughly amusing. This is a movie that is both universal and unmistakably Australian – and that’s just one of many delicate balancing acts that That’s Not Me achieves". That's Not Me won the award for Best Film Under $200k at the inaugural 2018 Ozflix Independent Film Awards.

In 2025 Foulcher and Erdstein collaborated on their sophomore feature film as screenwriters, One More Shot, which had its World Premiere at the 2024 SXSW Film Festival. It had its Australian Premiere at the 2025 Melbourne International Film Festival, followed by a release on Australian streaming service Stan. Erdstein and Foulcher were nominated by the Australian Writers' Guild at the 58th AWGIE Awards for Best Original Feature script.

== Filmography ==
Year	Title	Role	Notes
2026	One More Shot	Screenplay by	Feature film
2016	That's Not Me	Director / Co-writer	Feature film
2015	Paris Syndrome	Director / Co-writer	Short film
2014	Two Devils	Co-director / Co-writer	Short film
2014	A Bit Rich	Director / Co-writer	Short film
2013	Why Ryan is on Detention	Co-writer	Short film
2012	Picking up at Auschwitz	Director / Co-writer	Short film
2009	Facing Rupert	Director / Writer	Short film
2008	The Device	Director / Writer	Short film
2008	Work to Rule	Director / Writer	Short film
2007	Radius of Action	Director / Writer	Short film
2001	The Masterplan	Director / Writer	Short film
