= Alice Foulcher =

Australian writer and actress

- Education: Victorian College of the Arts
- Occupations: Actress, writer
- Known for: That’s Not Me (2017); One More Shot (2025)
- Spouse: Gregory Erdstein

Alice Foulcher is an Australian screenwriter and actress, best known for the Australian feature films That's Not Me (2017) and One More Shot (2025).

== That's Not Me (2017) ==
Foulcher co-wrote and starred in the feature film That's Not Me (2017). Filmed in Melbourne, Australia and Los Angeles, USA, That's Not Me had its world premiere at the 2017 Santa Barbara International Film Festival. The film had its Australian premiere in June 2017 at the Sydney Film Festival, where it came fourth at the Foxtel Movies Audience Awards. It placed ninth in the Audience Awards at the 2017 Melbourne International Film Festival. That's Not Me won the award for Best Film Under $200k at the inaugural 2018 Ozflix Independent Film Awards. It was ranked #5 of The Guardian’s Top 10 Australian Films of 2017. In 2020 That's Not Me was nominated for the AACTA Byron Kennedy Award, as one of the top 12 indie feature films of the past decade.

Foulcher's acting performance was met with critical acclaim, and earned her a Best Actress nomination for the 2018 Australian Film Critics Association Awards. That's Not Me holds a Rotten Tomatoes approval rating of 90%. Luke Buckmaster of The Guardian gave the film 4 out of 5 stars, writing "At the centre of That’s Not Me is a commanding performance from Foulcher, who establishes herself as a major emerging actor". Time Out also gave the film 4 out of 5 stars, with critic Nick Dent writing "Alice Foulcher deserves to be a lock for Best Actress [for the 2017 AACTA Awards]. [She] conveys low self-esteem with the comedic flair of a Kristin Wiig". Louise of Urban Cinefile wrote that "Foulcher is a knockout. She is unselfconscious and instantly likeable. Sibling rivalry, celebrity and chasing dreams have never been so much fun in this energetic, uplifting character-driven comedy that soars as surely as the trajectory of its irresistible star”. Andy Howell of Ain't It Cool wrote “[Alice Foulcher] shoulders all the drama and gives one of the best twin performances I’ve ever seen... Having nuanced drama embedded in a comedy is a tightrope walk, but she’s got the skills to land it.” Film Alert 101 suggested that Foulcher "may well be the comic talent of her age", radio station 2SER 107.3 described her as "absolutely superb throughout", and with Junkee Media writing that "it really is Foulcher's show".

== One More Shot (2025) ==
In 2025 Foulcher and Erdstein collaborated on their sophomore feature film as screenwriters, One More Shot, which had its World Premiere at the 2024 SXSW Film Festival. It had its Australian Premiere at the 2025 Melbourne International Film Festival, followed by a release on Australian streaming service Stan. Foulcher and Erdstein were nominated by the Australian Writers' Guild at the 58th AWGIE Awards for Best Original Feature script.

== Filmography ==
| Year | Title | Role | Notes |
|---|---|---|---|
| 2025 | One More Shot | Screenplay by | Feature film |
| 2017 | That's Not Me | Polly / Amy Cuthbert | Feature film (also Co-writer) |
| 2015 | Paris Syndrome | Unnamed lead | Short film (also Co-writer) |
| 2014 | A Bit Rich | Autumn | Short film (also Co-writer) |
| 2013 | Why Ryan is on Detention | Director / Writer | Short film |
| 2012 | Picking up at Auschwitz | Unnamed lead | Short film (also Co-writer) |
| 2011 | Harold Holt is Dead | Director / Writer | |
| 2009 | Going, Going | Director / Writer | |
