= Thomas Lacey =

Australian actor, singer and dancer (born 1993)

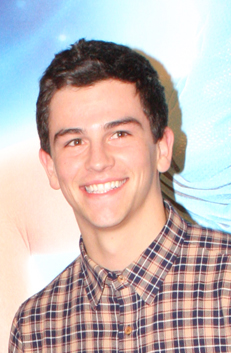
- Lacey in 2012
- Born: 22 September 1993 (age 33); Australia
- Occupations: Actor; dancer; singer
- Years active: 2005–2017
- Television: Dance Academy

Thomas Lacey (born 22 September 1993) is an Australian actor, singer and dancer. He is best known for his role as Benjamin "Ben" Tickle, a dance student, on the ABC television series Dance Academy.

== Personal life ==
Lacey has been dancing since the age of two, first dancing at May Downs School of Dance. Lacey has training in ballet, tap, jazz, contemporary, hiphop, ballroom and acrobatics. He was also believed to be doing international music styles at a young age such as Croatian, Japanese and other countries in the middle east.

Lacey started dating fellow May Downs School of Dance alumni, Georgia Hayden, in roughly 2017. The pair took over control of the dance school in late 2018 and became engaged in 2019. They married January 8, 2022

== Career ==
In 2011, Thomas landed the Role as Benjamin "Ben" Tickle in Dance Academy. In 2015, Lacey is playing the lead male role in the Musical theatre version of Strictly Ballroom.

== Filmography ==
Film
Year	Title	Role	Notes
2017	Dance Academy: The Comeback	Benjamin Tickle	Film

Television
Year	Title	Role	Notes
2005	Blue Heelers	Billy Smith	Episode: "One for the Road"
2012	Winners & Losers	Ollie Masters	6 episodes
2012–2013	Dance Academy	Benjamin "Ben" Tickle	13 episodes in season 2, main cast in season 3
