= Xenia Goodwin =

Australian actress and dancer (born 1994)

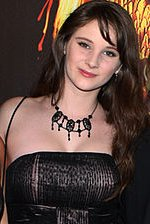
- Goodwin in 2012
- Born: Xenia Louise Goodwin; 7 February 1994 (age 32); Sydney, New South Wales, Australia
- Occupations: Actress, dancer
- Years active: 2010–present

Xenia Louise Goodwin (born 7 February 1994) is an Australian actress and dancer. Goodwin is best known for her starring role as Tara Webster, a dance student, on the Australian Broadcasting Corporation television series Dance Academy, which was her first on-screen appearance. She had a guest role on The Jesters in 2011. Goodwin studied dance at the Tanya Pearson Classical Coaching Academy and the Valerie Jenkins Academy of Ballet.

== Personal life ==
Goodwin grew up in the inner city suburb of Surry Hills and attended Crown Street Public School and Rose Bay Secondary College.

Goodwin stated that co-star Tara Morice's role in the 1992 film Strictly Ballroom inspired her to take up dancing. In July 2019, Goodwin was in a near-fatal car accident while in Zakynthos, Greece. The accident, which nearly left her a quadriplegic, fractured both her lumbar and cervical spine.

== Filmography ==
Year	Title	Role	Notes
2010–2013	Dance Academy	Tara Webster	Main role
2011	The Jesters	Bec	Episode: "The Fallout"
2015	Winter	Natalie Higgins	Episode: "Skeletons"
2017	Dance Academy: The Comeback	Tara Webster	Film
