= Dena Kaplan =

South African-born Australian actress (born 1989)

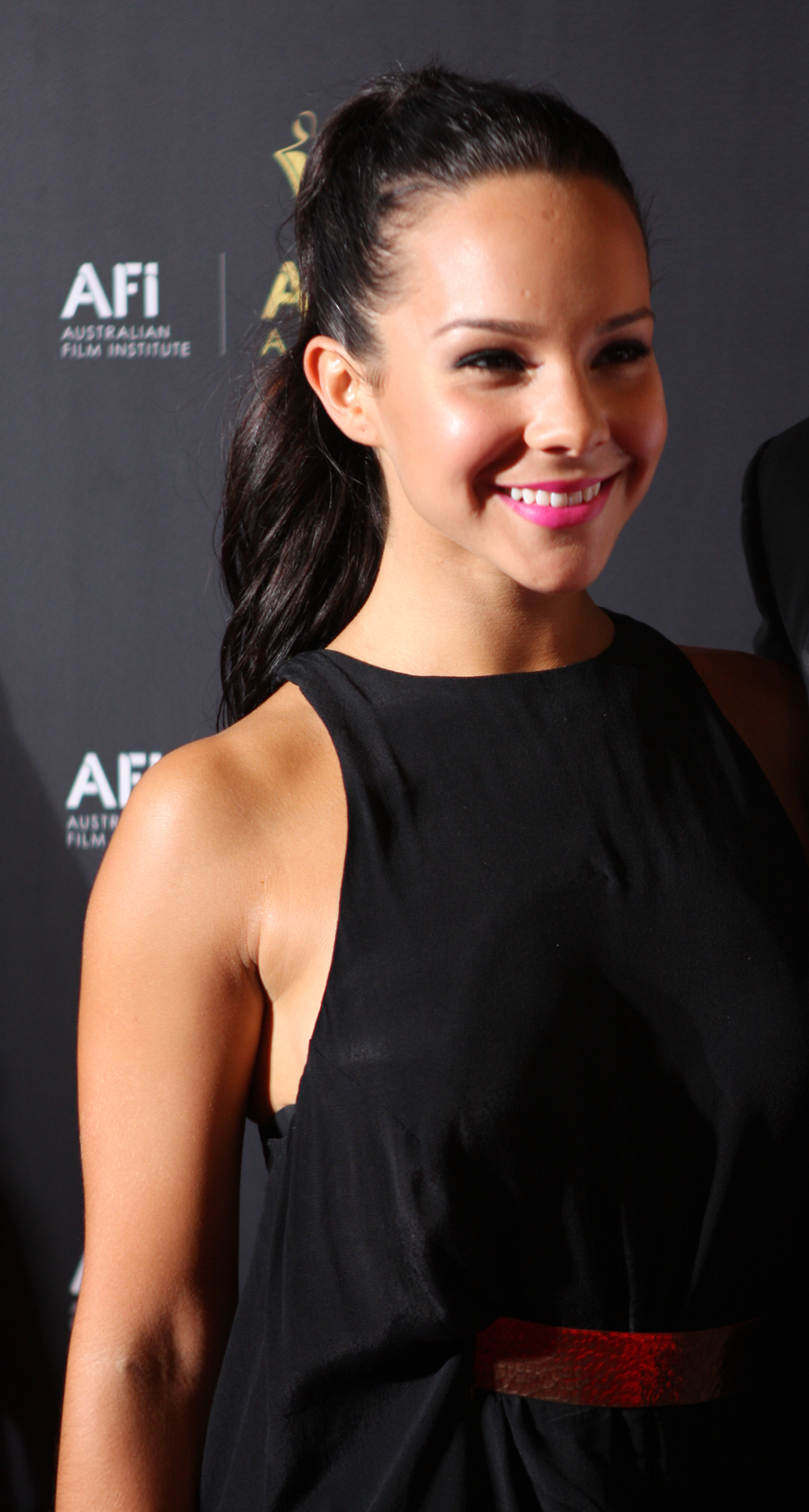
- Kaplan at the 2012 AACTA Awards
- Born: 20 January 1989 (age 37); Johannesburg, Gauteng, South Africa
- Occupations: Actress; dancer; model; DJ
- Years active: 1996–present
- Children: 1
- Relatives: Gemma-Ashley Kaplan (sister); Ariel Kaplan (sister)
- Website: denaamy.com

Dena Amy Kaplan (born 20 January 1989) is a South African-born Australian actress, singer, dancer, and DJ. She is best known for her role as Abigail Armstrong in Dance Academy.

== Life and career ==
Kaplan was born in Johannesburg, South Africa. Her mother and grandmother were both ballet dancers. Kaplan's father was a musician and her grandfather was an actor. Dena comes from a Jewish family. She has an older sister Gemma-Ashley Kaplan and a younger sister Ariel Kaplan, who played Lisa Atwood #2 on The Saddle Club. Kaplan moved to Melbourne in Australia in 1996, at age seven. After watching Gemma taking ballet lessons Dena followed in her footsteps.

Kaplan attended Mount Scopus Memorial College and had dance training at numerous schools, including Australian Ballet School, Jane Moore Academy of Ballet and City Dance Centre. She first appeared onstage alongside David Campbell in The Production Company's Carousel, playing Louise, a non-singing solo ballet part in the second act of the show. Her second major appearance was as a dancer/singer in Disney's musical production of The Lion King. She moved to New York City to study at the Ailey School and Broadway Dance Center.

Her first television role was in 2005 on the Network Ten spy series Scooter: Secret Agent as one of the party girls. In 2007, she appeared as Deborah Statesman in an episode of Australian police drama City Homicide. In 2009, she played Keli in an episode of Flight Of The Conchords and starred in the film In Her Skin alongside Rebecca Gibney. She was then cast in the series "Dance Academy" and in the same year was cast as Stephanie Wolfe in City Homicide. In 2011, Kaplan starred as the love interest in Chris Sebastian's music video for "Flow". During 2013 she was cast in the role of Sarah Brennen in Camp. A TV series that was set to star Gemma, Dena, and Ariel was workshopped.

Dena Kaplan is an ambassador for Soi Dog Foundation and together with her sisters, she is an ambassador for the Australian Cervical Cancer Foundation.

Kaplan lives in Sydney, Australia.

In December 2022, Kaplan announced her pregnancy via her Instagram page. She gave birth to her daughter on June 23, 2023.

== Discography ==
Dena Amy - Wait For You // 2016 Dena Amy ft. London Topaz - Your Eyes // 2017 Dena Amy ft. Kyle Waston - Diamonds Elle Skies' // 2017 Dena Amy - Jol // 2018

== Filmography ==
Kaplan with Jared Daperis, 2013

Film and television roles
Year	Title	Role	Notes
2005	Scooter: Secret Agent	Party Girl	Episode: "Operation: Double Oh"
2007	City Homicide	Deborah Statesman	Episode: "The Ripe Fruits in the Garden"
2009	In Her Skin	Pregnant girl with pram	
2009	Flight of the Conchords	Keli	Episode: "Unnatural Love"
2010	City Homicide	Stephanie Wolfe	Episode: "Atonement"
2010–13	Dance Academy	Abigail Armstrong	Main role
2012	Tricky Business	Minnesota Smith	Recurring role
2012	Mrs Biggs	Trish	Episode: "1.5"
2013	Camp	Sarah Brennen	Main role
2014	The Doctor Blake Mysteries	Amelia Yorke	Episode: "Crossing the Line"
2015	Della Mortika	Beatrix Della Morte	Short film; in post-production
2016	Honey 3: Dare to Dance	Nadine	Direct to video
2017	Dance Academy: The Movie	Abigail Armstrong	Theatrical film
2021	Long Story Short	Becka	Feature film
