= Alicia Banit =

Australian actress and dancer (born 1990)

- Born: 5 September 1990 (age 35); Australia
- Education: St Helena Secondary College
- Occupations: Actress, dancer
- Years active: 1995–present
- Children: 1

Alicia Banit (born 5 September 1990) is an Australian actress and dancer best known for her role as Kat in the ABC television series Dance Academy. She was also part of the main cast in We Were Tomorrow and had a recurring role in Playing for Keeps.

== Early life ==
Banit grew up in Melbourne and started dancing at the age of four, undertaking lessons in tap, jazz, ballet and hip hop at T-Jam Dance School. This led to a scholarship with Victorian College of the Arts Secondary School (VCASS) at the age of 12, where she learnt further dance styles including contemporary, character and acrobatics. She completed her schooling at St Helena Secondary College.

== Career ==
Banit first acting appearance was in the 1998 Australian film Dead Letter Office at the age of six, playing a minor role as the younger version of the main character, Alice. Comedy skits on shows called In Melbourne Tonight and Rove followed, before she took a hiatus from acting to focus on dance. At the age of 16, she resumed acting, playing a two episode guest role in the Network Ten soap opera Neighbours as Madison Sullivan (2006), before returning to the soap in 2008 for another two episode role – this time portraying Sharni Hillman.

From 2007 to 2009 Banit had two guest roles on the Australian version of the Disney Channel series As The Bell Rings, playing Amber. In 2007, she was cast as Kaitlyn in Chris Lilley's television series Summer Heights High, for the duration of the first season. In 2008, Banit appeared in Rush as Gemma Rose Parker acting alongside former Neighbours actress Eliza Taylor-Cotter. In 2009, she played Leah in season one of the Australian drama series Tangle. Later that year, she was cast as one of the main characters, Katrina Karamakov in the ABC television series Dance Academy.

From 23 to 27 August 2010, Banit was co-host on the ABC3 wrapper program Studio 3, alongside Kayne Tremills and Amberly Lobo.

== Personal life ==
Banit revealed via her Instagram account the birth of her first child, Isla Joy, born on October 10, 2022.

She has Macedonian heritage.

== Filmography ==
=== Film ===
Year	Title	Role	Notes
1998	Dead Letter Office	Young Alice	Feature film
2017	Dance Academy: The Comeback	Katrina Karamakov	Feature film
2020	mArk	Sarah	Short film
2021	The Quirky Best Friend	Sam	Short film

=== Television ===
Year	Title	Role	Notes
1995	Halifax f.p.	Young Jane	TV series, 1 episode
2006	Neighbours	Madison Sullivan	TV series, 2 episodes
2007–2011	As the Bell Rings	Amber (main cast)	TV series
2007	Summer Heights High	Kaitlyn	TV series, 8 episodes
2007	Pass the Plate	Herself	TV short form series, episode: "Mango"
2008	Neighbours	Sharni Hillman	TV series, 4 episodes
2008	Rush	Gemma Rose Parker	TV series, season 1, 1 episode
2009	Tangle	Leah	TV series, season 1, 6 episodes
2010–2013	Dance Academy	Katrina Karamakov (main cast)	TV series, 65 episodes
2010	Studio 3	Herself	TV series, 5 episodes
2017–2018	Superwog	The Neighbour, Holly	TV series, 3 episodes: Pilot; Episode 4: "The Formal"; Episode 6: "The Zombie Apocalypse"
2018	We Were Tomorrow	Siena Woodlands (main cast)	TV series, 6 episodes
2018	Playing for Keeps	Karlie Lum (recurring role)	TV series
2018	Olivia Newton-John: Hopelessly Devoted to You	Chloe Rose Lattanzi	TV miniseries
2019	Ms Fisher's Modern Murder Mysteries	Rita	TV series, season 1, 1 episode
2022	Summer Love	Ella	TV series, episode 7
2023	Crazy Fun Park	Asha	TV series, 1 episode
