= First Blood (Wentworth) =

- Wentworth episode
- Episode no.: Season 4 Episode 1
- Directed by: Kevin Carlin
- Written by: John Ridley
- Original air date: 10 May 2016
- Running time: 46 minutes

Guest appearances
- Libby Tanner as Bridget Westfall; Jacquie Brennan as Linda Miles; Sally-Anne Upton as Lucy Gambaro; Ra Chapman as Kim Chang; Charli Tjoe as Tina Mercado; Martin Sacks as Derek Channing; Luke McKenzie as Nash Taylor; Maddy Jevic as Lee Radcliffe; Richard Sutherland as Alan Doyle; Jason Geary as Radio DJ; Bessie Holland as Stella Radic; Sophia Katos as Mel Barrett; Katerina Kotsonis as Officer Murphy; Lisa Maza as Koori prisoner; Michelle Nisbet as Muslim prisoner; Milla Cormack as Tess Doyle; Demi Sorono as Kim Chang Stunt Double; Paul Rochford as Prison guard

Episode chronology
← Previous "Blood and Fire"	Next → "Poking Spiders"
- Wentworth (season 4)

"First Blood" is the thirty-fifth episode of the Australian drama series Wentworth. It is also the first episode of the show's fourth season, and was broadcast on 10 May 2016. The episode's story begins four months after the events of the previous episode, "Blood and Fire". "First Blood" saw the introduction of Kate Jenkinson's character Allie Novak, former prison Governor Joan (Pamela Rabe) returning as an inmate and the beginning of a rivalry between central character Bea Smith (Danielle Cormack) and Kaz Proctor (Tammy Macintosh). The episode also includes scenes set outside the prison, which follow Franky Doyle (Nicole da Silva), a former inmate who is released on parole. It was the first episode of the show to be filmed at a new rebuilt set. It has received generally positive reviews from television critics. Reviews regarding scenes in which Joan is incarcerated in a glass-walled cell were less favourable.

== Plot ==
The episode begins with Franky (Nicole da Silva) giving an interview on radio about her time inside Wentworth. While Franky is doing the interview, Bea (Danielle Cormack) is watching the world go by while travelling back to Wentworth after the fire. Vera and Channing are discussing the re-built prison block. Will (Robbie Magasiva) and Vera (Kate Atkinson) are standing with other prison guards awaiting the arrival of the other prisoners from Walford. When settling back into the new block, multiple prisoners welcome Bea back with gifts and Lucy Gambaro gives Bea a shiv in the belief that Bea may need it. Then a prisoner, Allie, comes to see Bea Smith (Danielle Cormack) informing her that Kaz wanted to see Bea but is told by Maxine that Kaz would have to meet Bea. Bea has a meeting with Vera about how they can work together to help the prison. Bea requests that the prison has conjugal visits that Walford has. Bea then goes and meets with Kaz where Kaz spitefully welcomes Bea back to the prison. Kaz then gives Bea a bottle of alcohol. Franky and Bridget Westfall (Libby Tanner) have been shown to be enjoying a lot of personal time together. Although it is shown that someone is watching them.

That night a van comes to Wentworth and Joan (Pamela Rabe) comes out of the van and the staff all become uneasy but Vera reassures them that it is just until her trial. The next day, the prisoners all witness Kim (Ra Chapman) scaling a barbed fence due to being on drugs. Bea is visibly disgusted. Kim has to be restrained by the prison staff on a hospital bed. Vera and Will discuss the possibility that it is meth she is on. When Bea and Maxine beat up the prisoner they believe supplied Kim the drugs, Kaz tells her gang that Bea is now the abuser. When Doreen leaves Bea alone in the showers, Allie comes in and looks at Bea naked, Bea then closes the curtain and finishes her shower. Bea walks over to Allie and confronts her. They end up having a fight in the shower when Bea pushes her into the wall. That evening, Bridget and Franky discuss the fact Joan knows about their relationship, Doreen (Shareena Clanton) gives Joshua over to Nash (Luke McKenzie) and Bea starts to cut herself.

== Production ==
On 21 April 2015, Foxtel announced that the episode would be screened in May 2016. SoHo aired a special show titled "An Audience With the Cast of Wentworth" on 3 May 2016. It was designed to offer the audience an insight into the show and build anticipation for the series premiere later that month. The episode first aired on 10 May 2016 in Australia.

The episode picks up four months after the events of the previous episode. A fire destroyed parts of the prison and several inmates had to be transferred to another facility until construction was completed. The episode marks a change in character dynamic as prison staff take on new roles. Vera is promoted to Governor and Will is promoted to Deputy Governor but still has a target on his back.

Atkinson told Carena Crawford from All About Soap that the episode features Joan returning to the prison as an inmate. She explained that writers included "psychological jousting" between Vera and Joan that is "really delicious". "First Blood" marks the first time Vera appears to have the "upper hand" over other characters. Atkinson warned that her character gets too confident too early because it becomes apparent by the end of the episode that Joan will not make prison life easy.

=== Casting ===
The episode featured Socratis Otto and Tammy Macintosh resuming their respective roles of Maxine Conway and Kaz Proctor, making their first appearances as regular cast members. Kate Jenkinson was also introduced during "First Blood" as new inmate Allie Novak. Regular cast member Aaron Jeffery who played Matthew "Fletch" Fletcher had left the show off-screen and prior to "First Blood" airing.

=== Locations ===
It was mentioned that "a new and bigger filming location for the series in western Melbourne, which on-screen will appear as a new wing of the prison."

David Knox for TV Tonight stated "Now filmed at a new location in western Melbourne, and helmed by a new Series Producer in Pino Amenta, there are changes on screen and behind the scenes."

== Reception ==
"First Blood" was watched by 140,000 Australians according to overnight ratings regarding the original airdate. In the United Kingdom 930,000 watched the episode on Channel 5. Seneca Cabrera from The Bit Bag stated "Wentworth does not like to disappoint their fans when it comes to releases. Episode 1 was shown yesterday, May 10, to give you a start of another season packed with exciting revelations once again." Graeme Blundell for The Australian described the episode's opening as "an eerie and atmospheric opening sequence" Elaine Atwell writing for AfterEllen said "I watched this episode, and I realized just how happy I am to be back behind bars." Atwell also praised the character development of Kaz during the episode, adding "even just one episode in, Kaz emanates an electricity that feels like standing too near a power station. She hums with it. Her face is tight with it..." "First Blood" was included in Soaplife's "Must see TV" feature. The features writer opined that it returned with plenty of stories and it was "all change" for the characters. TV Choice included the episode in their "pick of the day" feature and a writer said that it brought about "big changes" in the series.

Linda Howard from the Evening Times said that the episode sets up the show for another "turbulent season". Matt Baylis from the Daily Express criticised it, singling out scenes featuring Joan being held in a cell with a glass window. They noted it was implausible for her to be able "to smell things and spot tiny details that unsettle all who visit her" while behind glass. However, Gerard O'Donovan (The Daily Telegraph) disagreed and praised the scenes as "a triumph of camp, lip-quivering menace in a glass-walled cell." She added that "First Blood" was "an absolute belter, featuring a cast of fabulously strong, variably humane female characters." Michael Moran from Bt.com bemoaned the dearth of realism in the episode. They were cynical about a prison governor being incarcerated in their former place of work. They added that "First Blood" is "to be watched as it was made: with tongue firmly in cheek."

David Roy of The Irish News called this episode "A welcome return for the best prison drama on telly." Herts & Essex Observer stated "Welcome back to Wentworth Prison, the Australian jail where the staff are arguably more dangerous than the inmates." Meanwhile, David Stephenson from Express said " I’ve always wanted to see what happens when a woman willingly throws herself on to razor wire. The result was rather gross, and ear-splitting. Some moments in the drama were so out there, the continuity announcer warned the audience about “disturbing scenes” on returning from every commercial break."
