= Wentworth season 7 =

Wentworth
- Season 7
- Region 4 DVD cover
- Starring: Leah Purcell; Celia Ireland; Katrina Milosevic; Robbie J Magasiva; Tammy Macintosh; Kate Jenkinson; Bernard Curry; Rarriwuy Hick; Susie Porter; Kate Atkinson
- No. of episodes: 10

Release
- Original network: Fox Showcase
- Original release: 28 May – 30 July 2019

Season chronology
- ← Previous; Season 6 Next → Season 8

The seventh season of television drama series Wentworth premiered on Fox Showcase in Australia on 28 May 2019. It is executive produced by FremantleMedia's director of drama, Jo Porter. The seventh season picks up a few months after the events of last season's finale, the presumed closure of the case of Joan Ferguson and the subsequent arrest of former acting Governor, Derek Channing.

This season introduces multiple new recurring characters, Dr. Greg Miller (David de Lautour), Sean Brody (Rick Donald), Narelle Stang (Morgana O'Reilly), and Kylee Webb (Geraldine Hakewill).

== Plot ==
With the case of Joan Ferguson presumably closed, a significantly pregnant Vera and her co-conspirators in the Freak's demise, Will and Jake, are off the hook... at least for now. Meanwhile, Wentworth's eclectic mix of misfits are fracturing as the powers of love, deception and revenge threaten to break them apart for good. The onset of dementia finds Liz clutching at any semblance of hope, while Boomer has to deal with her feelings after the break-up of her family.

== Cast ==
Promotional image of the cast.

=== Main ===
- Leah Purcell as Rita Connors
- Celia Ireland as Liz Birdsworth
- Katrina Milosevic as Sue "Boomer" Jenkins
- Robbie J Magasiva as Deputy Governor/Acting Governor Will Jackson
- Tammy Macintosh as Kaz Proctor
- Kate Jenkinson as Allie Novak
- Bernard Curry as Jake Stewart
- Rarriwuy Hick as Ruby Mitchell
- Susie Porter as Marie Winter
- Kate Atkinson as Governor Vera Bennet

=== Special guest ===
- Nicole da Silva as Franky Doyle
- Pamela Rabe as Joan Ferguson

=== Recurring ===
- Jacquie Brennan as Acting Deputy Governor Linda Miles
- David de Lautour as Dr. Greg Miller
- Morgana O'Reilly as Narelle Stang
- Lucia Brancastiano as Officer Peta Webb
- Geraldine Hakewill as Kylee Webb
- Rick Donald as Sean Brody
- Chloe Ng as Nurse Shen
- Artemis Ioannides as Vicky Kosta
- Anni Finsterer as May Jenkins
- Emily Havea as Mon Alston
- Sarah Hallam as Jen Hutchins
- David Downer as Attorney-General Michael Heston
- Shane Connor as Ray Houser
- Bert LaBonte as Rodney Gavin
- Thomas Fisher as Artie Donaldson

== Episodes ==
No. overall	No. in season	Title	Directed by	Written by	Original release date	Aus. viewers
71	1	"Blood Wedding"	Kevin Carlin	Marcia Gardner	28 May 2019	89,000
Three months have passed; Rita is released from solitary and Marie returns from her court hearing, having both discovered they are to serve 15 years for their crimes. Rita and Kaz decide to band together to protect themselves from Marie's wrath. A new psychiatrist, Greg Miller, arrives, and Liz, whose condition is rapidly deteriorating, is in fear of ending up in the psychiatric unit. Vera and her baby's life are placed in jeopardy, which leads her to temporarily step down as prison governor. Will assumes the role of acting governor. Rita agrees to marry Ray, however, tragedy suddenly strikes on the day of their wedding as Ray is assassinated by hooded bikers upon entering the prison.
72	2	"Payback"	Kevin Carlin	John Ridley	4 June 2019	96,000
Rita and Kaz team up to bring Marie down, as Jake continues his jealous streak due to Vera becoming more attached to the new prison psychiatrist Dr Miller, who takes an interest in Liz. Boomer continues to tick items off of Liz's bucket list; she asks Jake to teach Liz how to tango. He agrees, and the sweet moment of them dancing is witnessed by Vera. Following interviews for the acting deputy's position, Linda Miles is appointed. This irks Jake, who resents being sidelined by Will and Vera. Allie almost falls into an old habit when she is used as a drug mule for Marie. Rita backs out of the revenge plan; Kaz then enacts the plan to take out Marie alone, rolling an explosive into her cell and shutting her in.
73	3	"Atonement"	Jonathan Brough	Max Conroy	11 June 2019	88,000
Kaz is sent to isolation for everyone's safety while Marie recovers from burn injuries on her arms in the infirmary. The Kaz-Marie conflict is complicated by the arrival of Narelle Stang, the sister of a disabled man that Kaz and Allie crippled, who also holds knowledge of Rita's background as a police officer. Sean Brody, an old colleague of Jake's from Walford prison, also joins the corrections team. Marie seduces Will, who allows her to print documents. The prison spirals out of control and Linda and Will struggle in their new positions to get the drug problem under control. Kaz is released from isolation after being assessed by Greg. She considers apologizing to Marie but changes her mind after seeing Marie caressing Will. Kaz confesses to Narelle that she hurt her brother, prompting Narelle to demand that Rita kill Kaz.
74	4	"Karen"	Jonathan Brough	Pete McTighe	18 June 2019	86,000
Narelle continues to pressure Rita into killing Kaz for hurting her brother whilst Marie is discharged from the medical unit. Ticking an item off her bucket list, Liz has sex with a male prostitute but he dies of a heart attack. Sean and Linda come up with a plan to hide his body. Vera discovers that her baby is a girl, leading her to question her parenting skills. Kaz, after learning the identity of Marie’s protector, rushes to find Allie, but is interrupted by Greg, who tells her they have a session. During this session, Kaz is finally able to let go of her troubled childhood and states she is proud of the woman she has become. However, this new journey she is ready to embark on is cut short when a hooded assailant shockingly slashes her throat. After unsuccessfully stumbling around trying to find someone to help her, Wentworth’s "Top Dog" manages to write a cryptic "M" in her own blood, before dying a lonely death on the ground.
75	5	"Ascension"	Beck Cole	Pete McTighe	25 June 2019	86,000
The prisoners and staff mourn the loss of their "Top Dog" Kaz, while the hunt is on for the person who murdered her. Tensions remain very high as the investigation into the death stirs up emotions for everyone. Liz, who is suffering from dementia, initially believes that she killed Kaz in a fit of madness but is cleared. While many of the women believe that Marie murdered Kaz, she is able to frame the drug dealer Vicky Kosta for Kaz's murder by planting her missing blood-stained hoodie in Kosta's drug stash. Following Kosta's arrest, Marie is able to convince the women to vote her as their new Top Dog by promising to honour Kaz's legacy.
76	6	"Mother"	Beck Cole	John Ridley	2 July 2019	72,000
After being clear of Kaz's murder, Vicky is released from the slot and is determined to pay Marie back for setting her up. Boomer is out on day release and tries to reconnect with her estranged mother May. However, the two end up back at Wentworth when May tries to steal cans of baby formula for drug manufacturing. Dr. Miller finds himself in breach of contract regarding Liz's medical trial when it is discovered that he failed to document some important information. Jake is suspended following false allegations that he sexually harassed Sean. Marie finally uncovers the truth about Danny's death, and is hellbent on making Ruby suffer; she poisons Ruby's food leading to her being slotted and Ruby collapsing.
77	7	"Bad Blood"	Fiona Banks	Marcia Gardner	9 July 2019	94,000
Ruby is rushed to hospital for urgent surgery for a burst brain aneurysm. Marie taunts a distraught Rita, who slashes her wrists and subsequently is put in isolation. Marie leaks information to her lawyer incriminating the disgraced regional manager Derek Channing for his involvement in prostitution. Jake blackmails Sean into dropping the sexual harassment complaints against him while Vera learns the true nature of his relationship with Sean. Allie finally begins to see Marie's true colours and requests a cell change after learning Ruby's fate. Liz asserts her authority over the troublesome May. Against Governor Jackson's orders, Vera allows Rita to visit Ruby in hospital. Ruby wakes up from her coma. Vera returns Rita to her isolation cell but is caught by Jackson when she returns the next morning.
78	8	"Protection"	Fiona Banks	Max Conroy	16 July 2019	103,000
Marie starts losing the support of the inmates including Allie as suspicion of her role in Ruby's poisoning grows. Ruby is released from hospital to the delight of Rita and her friends. Marie's mysterious protector sends a criminal disguised as a nurse to assassinate her but Rita saves her life; ending the conflict between the two women. Later, Marie's protector, a senior government official and Sean's pedophilic mentor, arranges for Sean and an unsuspecting Linda to bring Marie to a secret meeting. Marie's protector wants to kill her but, she is able to stop him by claiming that someone else beside her deceased lawyer has a copies of the incriminating photos. This incident turns Linda against Sean and leads her to turn to Jake for support. Meanwhile, relations between Governor Will and Vera are strained over Vera allowing Rita to visit Ruby. Vera in turn discovers evidence of Will's affair with Marie. After convincing her psychiatrist Greg to give her controversial medicine in breach of the rules, Liz reconciles with her estranged son Artie. Boomer is cleared of the shoplifting charges, making her eligible for parole. With Liz's help, Boomer stands up to her bullying mother May.
79	9	"Under Siege, Part 1"	Kevin Carlin	John Ridley	23 July 2019	91,000
Having evidence of Will and Marie's relationship, Vera demands that Marie be transferred. Liz receives a visit from Franky, whom she can't remember due to her dementia. She soon comes to understand that her condition will continue to deteriorate, despite the medical trial and persuades Dr. Miller to give her the full dose of her medication so that she can say a final goodbye to her son Artie. On the day of Marie's planned escape, Sean and two criminals attempt to evacuate Marie under the guise of a committal hearing. However, a lockdown ensues when Marie makes a second attempt to kill Ruby, causing Vera to discover Sean's accomplices. Sean and his accomplices take Liz, Allie, Linda, and several women in the laundry room hostage. Sean demands that Will lift the lockdown or he will kill hostages. Jake is worried because Vera and their unborn daughter are among the hostages. Rita manages to contact Will and informs him that Marie is Sean's mastermind. When Will rejects his demands, Sean fires his gun, leaving the lives of several characters hanging in the balance.
80	10	"Under Siege, Part 2"	Kevin Carlin	Pete McTighe	30 July 2019	110,000
It is revealed that Sean shot and killed Vicky Kosta as the siege continues. Rita enlists the help of Liz to free her from the holding cell, in which Rita fights back against Sean and his assailants and successfully manages to climb to safety through an air duct. Boomer tries to take Marie hostage, but ultimately fails, and as punishment, Sean shoots and kills May. Marie and the other hostages learn that Sean killed Kaz. Jake offers to take Vera's place as a hostage but to no avail. The police arrive and Sean strikes a deal to have them escape in a helicopter. The women are led to the roof, while Vera's life is spared when she goes into labour, and with the help of Liz and Boomer, she gives birth to a baby girl, whom she names Grace. The hostages are rescued from the roof and two of the criminals captured. Rita reveals her true identity to Will and with his help, Rita uncovers Marie's protector. Marie makes one last attempt at killing Ruby, which proves unsuccessful when Allie shoots Marie in the leg, before turning the gun on Sean, killing him instantly. With the siege at an end, Marie is informed that she will go into protection for good. Liz suffers a stroke, causing her to develop locked-in syndrome. At her prior request, she is euthanized by Boomer, who is charged with manslaughter. Rita, hoping to be exonerated, is transferred to protective custody. As her transport car passes three hooded vagrants, one of them is revealed to be Joan Ferguson, alive.

== Production ==
A seventh season was commissioned in April 2018, before the sixth-season premiere, with filming commencing the following week.

Foxtel's head of drama and Wentworth executive producer Penny Win said: "It's hard to believe we are already rolling the cameras on season seven of Wentworth. It feels like only yesterday we were reintroducing Foxtel viewers to such iconic characters like Bea Smith and 'The Freak' Joan Ferguson. The way in which our audience, both locally and internationally, has embraced and connected with the show goes to prove that people will watch, embrace, love and continue to support quality Australian drama.

New cast members joining the show during the season, included Dr. Greg Miller (David de Lautour), Sean Brody (Rick Donald), Narelle Stang (Morgana O'Reilly), and Kylee Webb (Geraldine Hakewill).

=== Original ending ===
Season seven of Wentworth was intended to be the final season; however, in December 2018, it was announced that the series was renewed for an additional 20 episodes which will broadcast through 2020 and 2021.

Following the renewal, several scenes from the final episode had to be cut, and new scenes were shot and inserted to lead the story into the eighth season. The cut scenes, which were intended to give closure to the series, included Franky and Bridget with Vera and Baby Grace, while another scene featuring three new prisoners who have arrived at Wentworth (cameo appearances by original Prisoner cast members Val Lehman, Fiona Spence, and Colette Mann who played Bea Smith, Vera Bennett, and Doreen Anderson/Burns, respectively).

== Reception ==
=== Ratings ===
No.	Title	Air date	Overnight ratings		Ref(s)
No.	Title	Air date	Viewers	Rank	Ref(s)
1	"Blood Wedding"	28 May 2019	89,000	2	
2	"Payback"	4 June 2019	96,000	1	
3	"Atonement"	11 June 2019	88,000	1	
4	"Karen"	18 June 2019	86,000	1	
5	"Ascension"	25 June 2019	86,000	5	
6	"Mother"	2 July 2019	72,000	2	
7	"Bad Blood"	9 July 2019	94,000	2	
8	"Protection"	16 July 2019	103,000	1	
9	"Under Siege, Part 1"	23 July 2019	91,000	2	
10	"Under Siege, Part 2"	30 July 2019	110,000	1	

=== Accolades ===
AACTA Awards

- Nominated: Best Television Drama Series – Wentworth

Australian Directors Guild Awards

- Nominated: Best Direction in a TV or SVOD Drama Series – Kevin Carlin for "Under Siege: Part 2"

Logie Awards

- The Logie Awards for 2020 have been suspended due to the COVID-19 pandemic and will feature as part of the 2021 awards with joint nominations for both seasons seven and eight.

== Home media ==
Title	Release	Country	Availabity		Region	Ref(s)
Title	Release	Country	DVD	Blu-ray	Region	Ref(s)
Wentworth: The Complete Season 7	2 October 2019	Australia	Yes	Yes	4/B	
Wentworth Prison: Season Seven	11 November 2019	UK	Yes	Yes	2/B	
Additional
Distributor: Roadshow Entertainment (Australia); Network (United Kingdom); Set details: 10 episodes; 500 minutes; 1.78:1 aspect ratio; Audio: Dolby Digital 5.1 (DVD); DTS-HD Master Audio 5.1 (Blu-ray); Subtitles: TBA; Discs: 3-DVD set (region 2 UK); 3-DVD set (region 4); 2-Blu-ray set (region B UK); Rating: ACB: MA15+; BBFC: 18; Notes: Season 7 is the first season to become available on Blu-ray in UK
