= Bridget Westfall =

Character in the Australian television drama Wentworth

- Wentworth character
- First appearance: "The Governor’s Pleasure"
- Last appearance: "Bleed Out"
- Created by: Lara Radulovich
- Portrayed by: Libby Tanner
- Status: Alive

In-universe information
- Full name: Bridget Westfall
- Nickname: "Gidget" (from Franky)
- Occupation: Psychologist
- Affiliation: Wentworth Prison; Matthew Fletcher; Vera Bennett
- Spouse: Franky Doyle
- Nationality: Australian

Bridget Westfall is a recurring character in Australian television drama Wentworth. Bridget is introduced as the prison's new psychologist to help the inmates. She is portrayed by Libby Tanner. Bridget is notable for her relationship with Franky Doyle (Nicole da Silva), which proved popular with fans of the television series. Other main storylines have involved Bridget's friendship with prison officer/governor Vera Bennett (Kate Atkinson), Bridget's support and assistance to other prisoners, and helping to reveal Ferguson's (Pamela Rabe) true colors.

== Creation ==
It was announced that Pia Miranda, Libby Tanner and Tammy McIntosh were lined up as guest stars for the third season of Wentworth.

No White Noise stated that Tanner's character would go the extra step further for Da Silva's character.

It was also said "Bridget's role in the prison is to examine the psychological state of the inmates and to help make Wentworth a safe and secure facility." It was also noted that she would get close with one of the prisoners.

== Backstory ==
The Wentworth website bills Bridget as "She may have dealt with some scary places and individuals, but she hasn't dealt with anything like Ferguson. Bridget has been openly gay since late high school and is at home with herself." In season 4, it is suggested by Ferguson that Bridget may have previously been raped. In the scene, Ferguson asks Bridget "Have you ever been raped?" To which she replies "I'm not answering any of your questions." Which Ferguson then responds to with "You just did." This exchange between the two characters infers that Bridget has been the victim of a rape.

== Storylines ==
In The Governor's Pleasure, Bridget confronts Ferguson about wanting to meet with Bea. In Knives Out, Bridget discusses the riot with other prisoners and tells them that whatever they say is in the strictest confidence. In Righteous Acts, Bridget starts having sessions with Franky, Franky admits to Bridget how much she wants revenge on Bea. When Bea is shivved later on, Bridget unwittingly accuses Franky. In The Long Game, Bea does her best to convince Bridget that she was drugged and that was the reason that she had a psychotic break. Alas Bridget doesn't believe her. Also Bridget learns that it was really Franky who killed Meg Jackson. Kim Chang accuses Bridget of having sex with Franky. In Goldfish, Bridget stops working with Franky and that angers Franky. It is later revealed that Bridget has fallen in love with Franky. In Freak Show, Bridget tries to find out why Jodie Spiteri stabbed her eye with a pencil. Vera outs an allegation of relationship between Bridget and Franky so Ferguson demands that Bridget leave the prison at once. As she leaves, Bridget tells Vera to look in a file for the truth. In A Higher Court, Bridget meets with Vera in a coffee shop and learns that Ferguson has brought Franky's parole forward. Bridget and Vera also discuss bringing Ferguson down. Bridget gives Franky a glowing report at her parole hearing. In Blood and Fire, Bridget is briefly seen awaiting Franky on her release, they kiss on top of a car.

In Season 4, Bridget is seen giving advice to Vera about Ferguson. It is also shown that Bridget and Franky are continuing their relationship in secret which is later discovered by Vera. Vera then confronts Bridget over her relationship and threatens to sack her and have Franky's parole revoked. Bridget later has dinner with Vera and Franky where they discuss Ferguson's petition to be moved to general where Franky realises Ferguson wants Top Dog. Bridget later interviews Ferguson where Ferguson exposes facts about Vera to which Bridget calls Ferguson "a cunt". After Ferguson's release into general, Bridget has a meeting with Vera to discuss the impact on the women from Ferguson's arrival. After Ferguson's sexual assault, Bridget interviewed her, Ferguson denied everything to Bridget. Bridget then sat in the meeting where Vera quizzed the other officers about how the attack had happened. Bridget suggests after the meeting that the attack could have been self-inflicted. Bridget offers her support to Kaz Proctor when her father passes away. Bridget then visits Allie Novak when drugs were found in her cell. Bridget was concerned when Allie told her that Bea was her reason not to use drugs. Bridget expresses her concerns about Bea to Will and Vera during a discussion over a vote for Top Dog. Bridget discusses options with Kaz over Kaz' long jail sentence. Bridget listens with Vera as Boomer pleads to go to the hospital with Maxine Conway for her cancer operation. Bridget questions the likelihood where Vera admits it's slim. Bridget visits Sonia in her cell the following day. Sonia talks about her respect for Liz to Bridget. Bridget later talks to Bea at Bea's request where they talk about sexuality and Bea's future. After an attack on Bea by Ferguson, Bridget takes a pivotal role in helping Bea through it. Bridget informs Bea of what happened. Bridget asks Bea about the self-inflicted scars on her legs. Bridget then tells Vera and Will that Bea is clinically depressed and is self-harming. Bridget asks Liz and Sonia about Bea's state to which Liz says she only saw Bea in a blank state when Debbie died. Bridget fetches Bea after calling Franky to visit Bea. Bridget tries to help Doreen over her wanting Josh back in Wentworth but Doreen doesn't like Bridget's advice and storms out. Bridget visits Bea and informs her that Allie is still in a critical condition.

== Reception ==
In a recap/review on AfterEllen, it was said that when Bridget told Franky that she was a lesbian, it was "five words you almost never hear on television".
In the write up of the following episode, Bridget and Franky are given a relationship name "Fridget". Star Observer reported that Bridget and Franky's chemistry "has spawned a legion of shippers, who create Tumblr and Twitter fanpages dedicated to the pairing. They have even dubbed the couple ‘Fridget’." Valerie Anne writing for AfterEllen stated about Bridget and Franky's relationship "I didn’t think anything could replace Franky/Erica in my heart…but then along came Bridget. She was everything Franky needed and more." Corey Sinclair of Star Observer claimed Bridget and Franky's relationship has won hearts all over the world. David Roy of The Irish News commented on how long Bridget and Franky's parole violating relationship could last.
