= Wentworth season 1 =

Wentworth
- Season 1
- Region 4 DVD Cover
- Starring: Danielle Cormack; Nicole da Silva; Kris McQuade
- No. of episodes: 10

Release
- Original network: SoHo
- Original release: 1 May – 3 July 2013

Season chronology
- Next → Season 2

The first season of the crime drama television series Wentworth originally aired on SoHo in Australia. The season consisted of 10 episodes and aired between 1 May and 3 July 2013. It was executively produced by FremantleMedia's director of drama Jo Porter. The series is a remake of Prisoner, which aired on Network Ten from 1979 to 1986. Lara Radulovich and David Hannam developed Wentworth from Reg Watson's original concept. The season was shot over four months from 10 October 2012.

The show is set in modern-day Victoria, Australia and focuses on the fictional women's prison Wentworth. The central characters in the prison are inmates Bea Smith (Danielle Cormack), Franky Doyle (Nicole da Silva), Doreen Anderson (Shareena Clanton), Liz Birdsworth (Celia Ireland), Jacs Holt (Kris McQuade) and prison officers Vera Bennett (Kate Atkinson), Matthew Fletcher (Aaron Jeffery), Will Jackson (Robbie Magasiva), Erica Davidson (Leeanna Walsman) and Meg Jackson (Catherine McClements).

The season received generally favourable reviews from critics. The first episode of Wentworth attracted 244,000 viewers, making it the most watched Australian drama series premiere in Foxtel history. The complete first season was released on DVD and Blu-ray in Australia on 18 November 2013.

== Cast ==
=== Regular ===
- Danielle Cormack as Bea Smith
- Nicole da Silva as Franky Doyle
- Kris McQuade as Jacs Holt
- Leeanna Walsman as Governor Erica Davidson
- Kate Atkinson as Deputy Governor Vera Bennett
- Celia Ireland as Liz Birdsworth
- Shareena Clanton as Doreen Anderson
- Aaron Jeffery as Matthew "Fletch" Fletcher senior officer
- Robbie Magasiva as Will Jackson senior officer
- Catherine McClements as Meg Jackson

=== Recurring ===
- Katrina Milosevic as Sue "Boomer" Jenkins
- Ra Chapman as Kim Chang
- Georgia Flood as Debbie Smith
- Jacqueline Brennan as Linda Miles
- Martin Sacks as Derek Channing
- Ally Fowler as Simone "Simmo" Slater
- Jada Alberts as Toni Goodes
- Jake Ryan as Harry Smith
- Reef Ireland as Brayden Holt
- Melitta St Just as Megan Summers
- Benne Harrison as Roz Jago
- Rondah Dam as Pip Turner

== Episodes ==
No. overall	No. in season	Title	Directed by	Written by	Original release date	Aus. viewers
1	1	"No Place Like Home"	Kevin Carlin	Pete McTighe	1 May 2013	244,000
Bea Smith is arrested and taken to Wentworth after attempting to murder her violent and rapist husband and is taken in by the lesbian, drug-dealing Franky Doyle, who uses her as a drug mule. Prisoners Liz Birdsworth and Doreen Anderson also befriend Bea. Governor Meg Jackson is becoming increasingly suspicious about the ladies and their ways of bringing crystal meth into the prison. Jacs Holt, Franky's rival, is released from solitary and starts a riot with the two factions fighting each other. Jacs and her gang corner Franky and attempt to mutilate her, but she is saved by Sue 'Boomer' Jenkins. Doreen leaves her daughter Kaiya with Bea to assist Franky, but when Kaiya runs off, Bea follows her and finds Meg lying dead in a pool of her blood.
2	2	"Fly Me Away"	Kevin Carlin	Pete McTighe	8 May 2013	102,000
After Meg's death, her husband Will returns to work and puts pressure on Doreen to find out who killed his wife. Bea tries to contact her daughter, Debbie, however Harry keeps picking up and comes to visit her. The prisoners try to get information out of Liz, who is working with the officers to discover the identity of Meg's killer. After threatening to kill Bea, Doreen reveals that Kaiya is actually Toni's daughter and that her own unborn child died after Doreen crashed her car. Will has a run-in with fellow officer Matt Fletcher. Later, Will is shown snorting cocaine. Doreen arranges for Kaiya's Mum Toni to get busted for using drugs, which sends Kaiya back to her grandma's house. Vera struggles with the Governor's role and she is demoted when Erica Davidson is appointed.
3	3	"The Girl Who Waited"	Catherine Millar	Pete McTighe	15 May 2013	110,000
Bea gets caught between in the intense rivalry between Jacs and Franky. Franky came to Wentworth after participating in a reality TV show that taught ex-offenders how to cook, she physically attacked the host with a pan of boiling oil after he mocked her on live TV. Franky cuts all ties with her estranged father when he visits her to apologise for abandoning her when she was ten. In Wentworth's laundry facility, Jacs forces Bea to bring the steam press down on Franky's hand after she threatens harm upon Debbie.
4	4	"The Things We Do"	Catherine Millar	Pete McTighe	22 May 2013	97,000
Ronnie forces her young daughter, Amy, to smuggle heroin into Wentworth for Jacs. Amy goes into cardiac arrest, but later it's revealed that she survived from the overdose. Jacs notes Bea's anger over the incident. Doreen and Boomer conspire over home brew that has been fermenting for months. Liz is told that her parole is being assessed. The Governor organizes an event to herald her prison reform programs with Liz encouraging the ladies to participate. After drinking all the home brew, Liz reveals that she is in Wentworth for accidentally killing her mother-in-law. Erica and Vera butt heads over the running of the prison. Jacs receives a visit from her husband Vinnie and learns that he is having an affair. Will continues his search for Meg's killer and discovers Fletch and Meg had a peculiar relationship.
5	5	"The Velvet Curtain"	Tori Garrett	Pete McTighe	29 May 2013	115,000
Erica begins to fantasise about having sex with Franky and begins to wonder whether her fiancé is really the person she wants to be with. Liz begins drinking methylated spirits and collapses when Doreen puts bleach in it. The rivalry between Franky and Jacs escalates. Doreen is offered the peer worker job after Liz is stripped of the role.
6	6	"Captive"	Tori Garrett	Pete McTighe	5 June 2013	92,000
Bea feels threatened when Harry says he may not be able to deal with Debbie's behaviour any longer. Vera's controlling mother visits Wentworth and reveals a humiliating secret about her daughter. Afterwards, Vera and Fletch become closer. Erica resolves to put aside her personal feelings for Franky.
7	7	"Something Dies"	Jet Wilkinson	Pete McTighe	12 June 2013	97,000
The women are tiring of Jacs' regime, and the officers decide to release Franky from solitary. Bea, after learning that Jacs and her gang are planning to gang rape Franky, asks Jacs not to go ahead with the attack, warning her of the consequences. In response, Jacs orders Bea to be beaten and sent to the medical unit. When Franky is released, she is ambushed however Boomer comes to her rescue. Doreen seemingly betrays Franky by siding with Jacs but she was helping Franky set a trap for Jacs. Franky slams Jacs' hand in an exercise machine. Will, whose drug use increases, discovers that while he and Meg were trying for a baby, Meg did fall pregnant and three weeks before she died, had an abortion.
8	8	"Mind Games"	Jet Wilkinson	Lally Katz & Emma J. Steele	19 June 2013	82,000
Bea's popularity is rising among the women. Erica offers Jacs the chance to go into protection for the rest of her sentence but she refuses. Jacs schemes to regain control by blackmailing Will, and demands that Vera brings medication for her arthritis into Wentworth, threatening to reveal that Vera told her to start a fight with Franky, leading to the riot in which Meg was killed. As Bea tries to get hold of Debbie, Jacs' son, Brayden gets Debbie addicted to heroin. Jacs tells him to end things with Debbie and he injects her with a high dose of heroin, causing her to overdose and die.
9	9	"To the Moon"	Kevin Carlin	Guila Sandler	26 June 2013	77,000
A heartbroken Bea is informed of Debbie's death and is refused permission to attend the funeral. Devastated, Bea tries to hang herself but is saved by Liz. The women rally around Bea to support her, and Jacs realises that not only has she failed to break her opponent but that the prisoners have all turned against her.
10	10	"Checkmate"	Kevin Carlin	Emma J. Steele	3 July 2013	125,000
After Vera and Fletch spend the night together she finds Fletch's diary, learning that Fletch and Meg were having an affair. Determined to find out who killed Meg, Will makes a deal with Jacs, however he later discovers Meg's bracelet in Jacs' cell and she is charged with Meg's murder. Franky admits to Liz she accidentally killed Meg during the riot. Liz had taken Meg's bracelet for safe keeping and in a ploy to get rid of Jacs, planted it in her cell. Bea suspects Jacs' involvement in Debbie's death and confronts her. Jacs confesses to ordering Brayden to kill Debbie and Bea stabs Jacs in the neck with a pen, killing her.

== Production ==
Wentworth was announced by Foxtel on 4 March 2012. Developed by Lara Radulovich and David Hannam from the original concept by Reg Watson, it is produced by Fremantle's new head of drama, Jo Porter, and is filmed in Melbourne. FremantleMedia Chief Executive Asia Pacific, Ian Hogg, said: "An entire generation of Australians grew up watching Prisoner and another is about to do the same with Wentworth."

=== Filming ===
The ten-part season began filming in Melbourne for five months from 10 October 2012 and the shoot employed 300 cast and crew. Wentworth is filmed on a purpose built set in the suburb of Clayton.

== Reception ==
=== Ratings ===
No.	Title	Air date	Overnight ratings		Ref(s)
No.	Title	Air date	Viewers	Rank	Ref(s)
1	"No Place Like Home"	1 May 2013	244,000	– (Note: There is no rank information on episode one based on the consolidated viewing figure of 244,000 due to the episode being screened on three different channels. The broadcast on SoHo ranked 2nd, on Arena it ranked 8th, while the airing on 111Hits did not rank within the top 20)	
2	"Fly Me Away"	8 May 2013	102,000	2	
3	"The Girl Who Waited"	15 May 2013	110,000	1	
4	"The Things We Do"	22 May 2013	97,000	1	
5	"The Velvet Curtain"	29 May 2013	115,000	2	
6	"Captive"	5 June 2013	92,000	1	
7	"Something Dies"	12 June 2013	97,000	3	
8	"Mind Games"	19 June 2013	82,000	3	
9	"To the Moon"	26 June 2013	77,000	13	
10	"Checkmate"	3 July 2013	125,000	1	

=== Accolades ===
Australian Screen Editors (2013)

- Nominated: Best Editing in a Television Drama — Philip Watts

AACTA Awards (2014)

- Nominated: Best Guest or Supporting Actress in a Television Drama — Kris McQuade
- Nominated: Best Television Drama Series — Wentworth - Jo Porter & Amanda Crittenden

ASTRA Awards (2014)

- Won: Most Outstanding Drama — Wentworth
- Nominated: Most Outstanding New Talent — Shareena Clanton
- Nominated: Most Outstanding Performance by a Female Actor — Danielle Cormack
- Won: Most Outstanding Performance by a Female Actor — Nicole da Silva
- Nominated: Most Outstanding Performance by a Female Actor — Kris McQuade
- Nominated: Most Outstanding Performance by a Male Actor — Aaron Jeffery
- Nominated: Most Outstanding Performance by a Male Actor — Robbie Magasiva

Equity Ensemble Awards (2014)

- Nominated: Equity Award for Most Outstanding Performance by an Ensemble in a Drama Series — Cast of Wentworth

Logie Awards (2014)

- Nominated: Logie Award for Most Outstanding Drama Series — Wentworth
- Nominated: Logie Award for Most Outstanding Actress — Danielle Cormack
- Nominated: Logie Award for Most Outstanding Newcomer — Shareena Clanton

== Home media ==
Title	Release	Country	DVD	Blu-ray	Region	Ref(s)
Wentworth: The Complete Season One	18 November 2013	Australia	Yes	Yes	4/B	
Wentworth Prison: Season One	4 November 2013	UK	Yes	No	2	
Wentworth: Season 1	15 November 2016	U.S.	Yes	No	1	
Wentworth: Die Komplette Erste Staffel	24 February 2017	Germany	Yes	Yes	2/B	
Additional
Distributor: Shock Records (Australia); FremantleMedia (United Kingdom); Acorn DVD (United States); WVG Medien (Germany); Set details: 10 episodes; 500 minutes; 1.78:1 aspect ratio; DVD Audio: English: Dolby Digital 5.1 (regions 1, 2 & 4); English: Dolby Digital 2.0 (region 2 Germany); Deutsch: Dolby Digital 2.0 (region 2 Germany); Blu-ray Audio: English: DTS-HD 2.0 (region B Germany); Deutsch: DTS-HD 2.0 (region B Germany); English: DTS-Master Audio 5.1 (Region B Australia); Subtitles: Deutsch (DVD & Blu-ray Germany); Discs: 4-DVD set (region 1); 3-DVD Standard Edition set (region 2 UK); 4-DVD Deluxe Edition set (region 2 UK); 4-DVD set (region 2 Germany); 3-Blu-ray set (Region B Germany); 5-DVD set (Region 4); 3-Blu-ray set (Region B Australia); Rating: ACB: MA15+; BBFC: 18; FSK: 16; Re-releases: DVD & Blu-ray from Roadshow Entertainment – 28 September 2016 (Australia); "Deluxe 4 Disc Edition" DVD – 17 April 2019 (United Kingdom)
