= Allie Novak =

Fictional character

- Wentworth character
- Allie in First Blood
- First appearance: "First Blood"; 10 May 2016
- Last appearance: "Legacy"; 26 October 2021
- Portrayed by: Kate Jenkinson
- Duration: 2016 – 2021

In-universe information
- Occupation: Prostitute
- Affiliation: Red Right Hand (formerly); Kaz Proctor; Bea Smith; Franky Doyle (formerly); Jake Stewart
- Significant others: Marie Winter (lover); Bea Smith (soulmate); Ruby Mitchell (girlfriend)

Allie Novak is a fictional character from the Australian drama series Wentworth, played by Kate Jenkinson. She made her first appearance during the fourth season episode titled, "First Blood", broadcast on 10 May 2016. The character was introduced as a new prison inmate and friend of Kaz Proctor (Tammy Macintosh), participating in their vigilante group, which has a vested interest in protecting women. One story writers developed for Allie was a romance with then-central character Bea Smith (Danielle Cormack), a pairing that television critic Elaine Atwell has praised.

== Casting ==
Kate Jenkinson had wanted a role in Wentworth since she had started watching the show while sick with the flu. Jenkinson recalled that when her agent contacted her informing her of the role in Wentworth, she replied "well it's mine". The actress has stated that "playing a character so “damaged and broken and colourful” is a responsibility she takes seriously." Jenkinson decided to research her role by seeking out women similar to her character. Her search led her to women's outreach centers, where residents shared her own experiences and advice.

== Development ==
Allie was once a drug addicted street prostitute who suffered abuse by her clients and her pimp failed to protect her. Kaz found her and insisted on taking her under her wing. Fiercely independent, Allie had no interest in being saved by anyone but she was interested in the violent retribution the Red Right Hand was enacting. As a gay woman, Allie found solace being with women and emotional respite from a lifestyle she couldn’t escape. Kaz let Allie live with her and together they attacked the various John Goodson's who had assaulted Allie over the years. Having somewhere to sleep every night and a purpose during the day, helped ease Allie’s drug dependency. She owes Kaz a lot and now the crew has been apprehended and doing time in Wentworth, she is firmly in Kaz’s camp and her loyal compatriot.

— An excerpt taken from the character's biography on the show's official website.

The sentence is Allie's second prison term. She had previously been incarcerated for assault. Despite this charge, the character is not "flustered" and actually brings "a warm and disarming wit" to the show. Jenkinson told David Knox of TV Tonight that "what really attracted me to her as a person and character was this endless positivity and optimistic outlook on life. Perhaps that comes from having experienced the worst that life has to offer. She has the attitude that things can only get better." Additionally, Allie was billed as "an ice-addicted prostitute with a warm and engaging wit."

== Storylines ==
=== Season 4 ===
Allie approaches Bea Smith (Danielle Cormack) to arrange a meeting with Kaz. Maxine Conway (Socratis Otto) warns her that Bea is in charge. Allie witnesses Maxine beating up another prisoner under Bea's orders. Allie stares at Bea's body in the shower which causes a bloody fight. Governor Vera Bennet (Kate Atkinson) does not support her inmates request of conjugal visits. Allie takes part in a nude protest against her decision. Allie asks Bea for a haircut to spend time with her.

Former governor Ferguson (Pamela Rabe) is placed on Allie's prison block and other inmates begin to harass her. Allie gives Boomer (Katrina Milosevic) advice about sex, knowing that Bea is listening she goes into more details to make her feel uncomfortable. Allie later apologizes to Bea and she explains her past as a prostitute and discusses ex-lovers. She also makes fun comments to Bea which are well received. Joan recovers from a gang-rape attack, a scenario she manipulated into happening in order to appear as a victim towards the members of Kaz's female protection group. She begins manipulating Kaz and leads her to believe that officer Will Jackson (Robbie Magasiva) was her attacker. Kaz plans to attack Will but the plot is halted after Allie informs Bea. Kaz confronts Allie but she denies ever telling Bea their plans.

Joan plants drugs in Allie's cell and she is sent to the solitary confinement block, the slot. Counsellor Bridget Westfall (Libby Tanner) visits her and she denies using drugs. Allie and Bea chat to each other through an air vent in their cell wall. They discuss their pasts and begin to bond. When she is released she has to convince Kaz that the drugs were not hers. Allie visits Bea's cell and catches her self harming, she shows Bea sympathy and tends to her wounds. Allie gives Bea some ointment to help conceal her self-harming scars and applies it. Bea warns Allie that she is not a lesbian. She tells Bea that she intends to leave Kaz's group and realign herself with Bea. She warns Allie not to, explaining that it will make her a target for other inmates to gain advantage against Bea. Allie kisses Bea, but unbeknown to them, Ferguson has witnessed it. She continues to meet with Bea for romantic liaisons in the kitchen. Ferguson monitors their meeting times and begins a plot to murder Bea. Allie tells Bea that Kaz believes she is to blame for her vigilante group's incarceration. Kaz makes Allie join a protest, while Ferguson drugs and attacks Bea in the kitchen. Will gains evidence that Ferguson reported Kaz to the police. She rushes to save Bea from Ferguson. Allie becomes hysterical as a lifeless Bea is laid on the floor. After Bea is rescued, Allie is questioned by Vera and Will, Allie denies any knowledge of what happened. When Bea believes that Kaz and Allie played her, Allie is heartbroken and begs Kaz to set the story straight which doesn't happen. Allie tries to beat Kaz up but Kaz just forcibly hugs her until she calms down. Heartbroken, Allie relapses on to the drugs and takes cocaine. During the episode Smitten, Allie is flaunting herself in the exercise yard, Kaz takes Allie away when Bea refuses. When Lucy is beating Allie up in the showers, Bea and Maxine come to her aid, Allie confesses her love to Bea. Later in the episode, Bea supports Allie during cold turkey. Allie and Bea start a relationship in the following episode and then proceed to consummate their relationship. After having sex, Allie goes to the showers where Ferguson gives her a hot shot. Bea finds Allie in the showers and raises the alarm. Allie is transferred to hospital and placed on life support. Some time later Allie suddenly wakes up.

=== Season 5 ===
Days later Allie wakes up to learn that Bea has died from Joan Ferguson (Pamela Rabe). Allie then returns to Wentworth prison where she is supported by many inmates. When Ferguson goes out into the main exercise yard, Allie attack her but is quickly defeated by Ferguson. Allie then confirms to Vera that she was indeed gave a hot shot. Allie figures out that Franky Doyle (Nicole da Silva) wants to escape. Despite a previously failed attempt, Allie is still determined to avenge Bea's death and kill Ferguson. She creates a stash of drugs in her cell intending to give Ferguson a hot shot. The attempt failed and she is devastated. Franky tries to comfort Allie and tells her she wants Allie to come with her when she escapes.

== Reception ==
Elaine Atwell for AfterEllen branded the character "Kaz’s second-in-command, a rather comely blonde I have taken to calling 'Opposite-of-Vinegar-Tits'". Reflecting on Allie and Bea's show fight scenes Atwell pondered "so it is wrong, very wrong, how much I enjoyed this scene, right?" Atwell later observed more scenes between Allie and Bea and drew comparisons to the German-British film Imagine Me & You. She described the relationship as being a "slow burn" story. She loved the pairing but felt nervous about the outcome. When the pair kissed, the critic professed "one of the most beautiful relationships I have ever had the privilege to write about." Atwell added "Oh, it’s everything. I never hoped for this, never expected it, and it is all the sweeter for being a surprise. Not just sweet, it is a balm. A healing salve on my heart, and on the scars we have all sustained lately." The critic wrote about the relationship, "My feelings about this couple seem to be a bottomless well; I can pour out page after page about the way it makes me feel to see them together, and I still find new facets to marvel at." The critic gave the relationship the name "Ballie". The critic has stated that Allie is "kind and patient, a walking silver lining". It was also written about Allie and Bea "Up until now, we’ve been in the dazed wonderland with them". The critic has also accused the character of being a "violent transphobe".

A writer from The Bit Bag watched the show fight scene and said that Wentworth was "really packing in heat with Allie and Bea". The writer later wrote after the kiss between Allie and Bea, "This is the biggest moment Ballie fans have been waiting for (including me)!" Danielle Cormack who plays Bea, stated "Kate Jenkinson as Allie Novak is just gorgeous and brings this great heart to the show."
