= No Place Like Home (Wentworth) =

- Wentworth episode
- Episode no.: Season 1 Episode 1
- Directed by: Kevin Carlin
- Written by: Pete McTighe
- Original air date: 1 May 2013
- Running time: 46 minutes

Guest appearances
- Georgia Flood as Debbie Smith; Jake Ryan as Harry Smith; Katrina Milosevic as Boomer; Ra Chapman as Kim Chang

Episode chronology
← Previous —	Next → "Fly Me Away"
- Wentworth (season 1)

"No Place Like Home" is the first episode of the Australian TV series Wentworth. This episode introduces the major characters and focuses on protagonist Bea Smith being introduced to and trying to fit into prison life, while flashbacks reveal her domestic abuse at the hands of her husband and the circumstances that result in her coming to Wentworth.

== Plot ==
The episode begins with Bea Smith being transported to Wentworth Prison. Just after arriving, she witnesses another prisoner in the van giving a guard oral sex in exchange for cigarettes. Bea is then processed by Will Jackson; when she realizes she hasn't spoken to her daughter Debbie, she becomes hysterical and has to be sedated.

The next day, Bea is taken to her unit by Deputy Governor Vera Bennett. Bea is shocked to find Franky Doyle and Kim Chang having sex in her cell. Franky, the head of her unit, mocks Bea's name, but shows interest upon learning that Bea is a hairdresser. Bea then meets the other members of the unit, including Liz Birdsworth, Sue "Boomer" Jenkins, and Doreen Anderson. Bea offends Doreen a little when she notes that she wouldn't want Debbie seeing the inside of a prison, as Doreen has her daughter Kaiya living in the unit with her.

Franky intimidates Bea into acting as a drug mule, receiving a balloon from a stranger during a conjugal visit. Governor Meg Jackson, who is determined to crack down on drug trafficking, observes Bea taking the drugs on CCTV and eventually catches her with them. Bea refuses to implicate Franky and Meg decides to "slot" her in solitary, where Bea overhears Jacqueline "Jacs" Holt singing On the Inside (the theme song of Prisoner, the series that inspired Wentworth). Will arrives with breakfast the next morning and, during a smoke break, tells Bea that her silent approach is the best way to be, especially with the women. When Bea again refuses to implicate Franky, she is returned to the unit, having earned the respect of Franky and her crew.

Meg, against the concerns of the staff and especially prisoner advocate Erica Davidson, releases Jacs from the slot early as another attempt to weaken Franky's hold on the drug trade. Jacs attempts to intimidate Bea and turn her into a servant, but Bea, remembering how her husband used to do the same, refuses to be cowed, humiliating Jacs in front of the other prisoners. Jacs then promises retribution against Franky, who set her up to be slotted.

Franky, seeing Jacs as too big a threat to leave alone, rallies support to start a riot, despite Liz's objections. A massive fight breaks out in the yard and Doreen leaves Kaiya with Bea while she joins Franky. Jacs avoids the riot and is confronted in her cell by Franky, who is then overpowered by two of Jacs' crew. Jacs starts to cut off Franky's tattoos, but is stopped when Boomer intervenes.

Bea loses track of Kaiya and, while searching for her, trips over a dead body, which turns out to be that of Meg Jackson. The episode ends with Will crying over his wife's body, while Bea, covered in Meg's blood, stands in shock.

=== Flashbacks ===
Bea is regularly subjected to physical and sexual abuse by her husband Harry, flashbacks of which are occasionally triggered by events in the present. Bea works up the courage to try and kill Harry by drugging him, tying him up in his car and filling the garage with exhaust fumes, but cannot bring herself to follow through and saves him while Debbie calls for an ambulance.

Harry later tells the police that he was feeling suicidal, but continues to hit Bea when they are alone.

== Reception ==
TV Equals described this episode as "Things have been changed to suit modern sensibilities, of course, and this updated series has been stripped of the campy sets, dialogue and black humour and populated instead with sex, violence and a heroine with a journey to go on. That’s Bea Smith, a woman who has been put away for the attempted murder of her abusive husband, and her experience in this first episode will surely inform her future trajectory up the hierarchy of her new surroundings. But first she’ll have to contend with warring queen bees Franky and Jacs, whose confrontation this week results in the death of a warden."

Elaine Atwell, writing for AfterEllen, said " I tell you this not to scare you off, but to caution you that if you’re looking for a show to fill the OINTB-shaped hole in your heart, this one is actually likely to wound you much deeper. Anyway, welcome to Wentworth prison. Let’s jump right into the trauma, shall we?"

John Crace writing for The Guardian stated "Just with more lesbians, more tattoos and more violence. And fewer sets that wobbled any time someone accidentally knocked into them. I can't believe this is the best drama being made in Australia right now, but I also can't believe that the only place in the whole prison without CCTV is the exact spot where Governor Jackson got knifed, shortly after snogging one of her wardens – male, surprisingly – in her office. It was also disturbing to find the lead character – wrongly banged up, obviously – looking like a young Rebekah Brooks. If you like this sort of thing, you're in for a treat. I rather preferred the wobbly sets."

Ian Hollingshead writing for The Telegraph said "The final showdown between Franky (Nicole da Silva) and Jacs (Kris McQuade), a young tattooed lesbian and a schoolmarmish matron, laced with malice as they fought over who would be top dog, was so compelling – and the cliffhanger so agonising – that it would be a crime to miss the next instalment."

=== Ratings ===
Wentworth drew in 244,000 viewers for its premiere. Meanwhile, Foxtel spokesperson Jamie Campbell said that "more people watched Wentworth last night than any other Australian drama series premiere in Foxtel history".
