= Franky Doyle (Wentworth) =

- Wentworth character
- First appearance: "No Place Like Home"; 1 May 2013
- Last appearance: "Under Siege Part 1"; 23 July 2019
- Created by: Reg Watson
- Portrayed by: Nicole da Silva; Jasmine Loizzo (young)
- Crime(s): Murder; Assault
- Sentence: 7 years (on remand)

In-universe information
- Full name: Francesca Rose Doyle
- Occupation: Chef (formerly); Law student
- Affiliation: Bea Smith; Boomer; Allie Novak; Will Jackson
- Family: Alan Doyle (father); Tess Doyle (half-sister); Bridget Westfall (wife)
- Nationality: Australian

Francesca Rose Doyle is a fictional character and protagonist in the television show Wentworth. She is a former prisoner of Wentworth Correctional Centre. She served mainly as the primary antagonist for season 2, before becoming a protagonist for season 3. In season 4, Franky was released from Wentworth after she fought for her innocence, and began her career as a legal aide. She returned for seasons 5 and 6 as the series' main protagonist, until her release and subsequent departure from the series.

== Development ==
In an interview da Silva said that Franky was "someone who is so dynamic, but she comes from a really messed-up childhood and that has impacted on the way she operates."

Up until "Poking Spiders", Franky had appeared in every episode, except for seven episodes on season 4. Franky was absent in "Prisoner". Franky is absent in episode "Screw Lover", "Love and Hate", "Divide and Conquer", "Panic Button" and "Plan Bea." Franky's absence is mentioned within the series when Doreen mentions not being able to get a hold of her in "Divide and Conquer"

Da Silva made her last appearance as Franky during the sixth-season episode "Bleed Out", which aired on 3 July 2018, until she returned to visit Liz in Under Siege Part 1 of the Seventh Season.

== Time At Wentworth ==
Franky Doyle is serving a 7-year sentence at Wentworth and is the Top Dog at Wentworth at the start of Episode 1. The "return" of Jacs Holt threatens this, as Jacs and Franky are involved in a rivalry for the top dog position.

We first meet Franky when Bea Smith arrives and is shown to her cell. Franky is having sex with Kim Chang there and afterwards, emerges to talk to Bea. She immediately sees an opportunity in Bea—one of Franky's drug smuggling plans fails, and she coerces Bea to smuggle drugs in for her. Franky holds up the line for the phones, and implies she can keep doing so, in order to stop Bea from seeing Debbie.

Franky receives lots of fan mail at Wentworth, in part due to the nature of her crime. She was a participant on a Reality TV show about underprivileged youth being given the chance to learn to cook, and she violently attacked the host after he verbally abused her on camera, burning him with hot oil. The incident however garnered nearly 100 million views on Popview, a video sharing website.

From a young age, Franky had a hard upbringing. Her father left when she was ten, unable to cope with his wife's drinking and drug problems. He left Franky with her mother, reasoning that a mother wouldn't hurt her own child.

It is revealed in the season 1 finale that Franky killed Meg during the riot. The murder was accidental as Franky thought Jacs had grabbed her from behind so stabbed the person in defense. To her shock, it was in fact Meg she stabbed, not Jacs. Franky also appears to have a soft spot for the Governor Erica Davidson as they both often flirt and exchange long lingering looks between one another throughout season 1, which culminates in episode 10 with them engaging in a forceful kiss which both passionately enjoy.

After Bea is released from solitary confinement at the beginning of season 2, Franky orders Boomer to attack Bea to display dominance as the new top dog since Jacs Holt's death. This causes friction between Franky and Bea.

Franky is being monitored by The Governor, who knows Franky is responsible for the smuggling of contraband into the prison. Franky takes advantage of the garden project, organizing a male inmate from Walford prison to import drugs in return for oral sex from Boomer. The inmate informs Franky of a new product called "Pink Dragon", which he adds will "cost her." Franky and the inmate meet in the garden shed, where the drugs are located. The male inmate implies she will have to perform sexual favours for him in order to earn the drugs. As he tries to rape her, Franky grabs a garden fork and stabs the man in the genitals. His screams alert the guards of the situation. Liz informs The Governor of the whereabouts of the missing drugs, which results in Boomer being sentenced to seven additional years in Wentworth when the drugs are discovered in her cell.

The identity of the lagger is unknown to Franky, who becomes paranoid, originally accusing Doreen and later attempting to strangle Bea before Liz confesses. Franky and Liz have an emotional discussion, in which Franky admits that Liz is the only one to ever care about her. Before leaving H Block, Franky warns Liz not to come back to Wentworth.

Franky sees an opportunity in Maxine, trying to hire her as a henchman. When The Governor cuts off Maxine's hormone treatment, Maxine seeks out Franky to smuggle the drugs for her, and in return becomes a part of her crew. Franky orders Maxine to attack Bea, who Franky suspects is working with The Governor and conspiring against her.

Boomer informs Franky that she is planning an attack on Liz on the outside, to which Bea interferes and gets Boomer locked up for an attempted attack, to which Bea remarks that she and Franky are going down.

After Boomer is slotted, Franky confronts Bea in the cafeteria, who admits she is planning to take over as top dog. Franky finds out that Maxine is working with Bea, passing on information and smuggled in a shiv. Franky seizes the shiv, prompting Bea to sneak into the mail room to steal a Stanley knife and tape.

In the second to last episode of the season, Franky uses the knife against Bea during a fight outbreak in the laundry. Bea wins the fight, turning down the opportunity to kill Franky using a box cutter, and instead slices her owns arms and ends up in the hospital.

In the season final, Franky has lost the respect of the other inmates. The Governor offers her the place of top dog if she sides with her. Franky learns that her partner, Kim, will be leaving Wentworth as her parole has been approved. She and Franky argue over the two resuming their relationship outside of the prison, with Franky brushing Kim off, telling her to return to her boyfriend.

As the second season comes to an end, Franky and Bea come face-to-face on Bea's return to H Block, after being arrested for the murder of Brayden Holt, to which Franky tells the onlooking crowd that Bea is the new top dog.

In the episode Blood and Fire, Joan Ferguson lights Wentworth on fire and gets trapped with Doreen's baby Joshua, Franky and Bea turn around and go looking for Jess and Joshua, they find them in a rubbish area, the ceiling starts collapsing with Bea, Joshua, Franky and Ferguson trapped inside. Bea climbs through the vent while holding Joshua and exits the building. Bea gives Doreen Anderson her baby and then runs back inside to save Franky and Will Jackson runs in after her. Will and Bea manage to push the door open and Bea grabs Franky and tells Will to leave Joan there but Will grabs her and brings her out. The place burns down with Jess inside but everybody else gets out.

In season four, Franky is living with her prison psychologist Bridget Westfall and is lying to the parole board about where she's staying. They both come to the conclusion that it would be best for Franky to leave so she doesn't get into more trouble. She gets a job as an assistant in 'Legal Relief' a small law firm. Franky visits Bea in Wentworth after Ferguson tried to drown her, Bea confesses she is now in love with a woman to Franky's amusement. Bea asks Franky to monitor Shayne (Jianna's son who Ferguson is receiving regular visits from) and she sparks up a friendship with the boy who she is helping with his case. Shayne finds out Franky's real motives and Ferguson orders him to the court house for her trial and he brings a handgun. Bea calls Franky to alert her, she goes to the court house and Shayne confronts her with the weapon only for Franky to talk him out of it. They embrace and Franky explains to Shayne that Ferguson has manipulated him as she does with everyone else.

In Season 5, Franky ends up back in Wentworth being accused of Mike Pennisi's murder, The man was mad and had a wall memorial all about Franky, which his girlfriend Iman Farah didn't like, so she killed him and framed Franky. Franky becomes allies with Allie Novak who eventually helps her make an escape to prove her innocence. When Iman Farah comes into Wentworth as an inmate, she makes several attempts to kill Franky, before coming pretty close to being stopped by Joan Ferguson who snaps her neck. Later on, Allie's and Franky's plan goes sour, when the screws come to check the boxes, Allie decides she will go and cover for Franky. Jake Stewart catches her on the way and eventually gets the truth out of her; he decides to tell Will Jackson, the three of them come up with a plan that might get rid of Joan once and for all. Jake tells Joan the only way for her stay even alive is to get out. Franky's box gets taken in the truck like the rest and she gets off at the drop off point. She finds Bridget out of her office, confesses her love and says she will prove her innocence.

At the beginning of season 6, Franky is a fugitive who hides from society and sleeps in abandoned trains. Warning photos of her and Ferguson are put in newspaper advertisements around the city.

In episode 6x01, she buys a prepaid phone card, in order not to be traced if she has to call. Later, she goes to Bridget's house and asks to be taken to Iman Farah's house, but after police follows her, she decides to go by herself. There, she takes all what can be helpful to find evidences of her innocence, although nothing very relevant seems to be found. She then understands that it is going to be difficult to prove her innocence.

In episode 6x02, a homeless tries to steal from her backpack; after rejecting him, Franky sees in some fallen papers a reference to Iman and Pennisi's psychologist Zoe Taylor; she calls her and organises an appointment under a false name. Before going to the appointment, she breaks and enters the therapist's house and sees in Iman's files that the refugee confessed Pennisi's murder. During the appointment, Doyle reveals her identity, trying to convince Taylor to help her, but actually Zoe will call the police and warn Franky about it just before the cops arrive. The escapee manages to run for a short time but then is shot in her right shoulder.

In episode 6x03, after finding a temporary shelter in a public toilet, Franky is severely hurt after the shot, and calls Bridget for help. After hiding again in an abandoned train, they figure out that the most useful evidence they can find is hidden in Iman's lock-up garage, so Bridget manages to steal the key from Wentworth archives, by cheating Vera, and to give it to Franky without being noticed by the police.

Soon after entering the garage, Doyle, still suffering for the wound, is reached by police cars and tries to lock herself in; just before police breaks in, she finds the photos of Pennisi's wall memorial.

She is then immediately arrested and wakes up in a hospital bed, with Bridget at her side; they are then approached by the detective, who states that, after finding in the garage a mobile phone with many photos of Pennisi's corpse, and after Tina Mercado testified against Ferguson regarding Iman's murder, the charges against Franky are totally dropped.

Doyle, then, comes to Wentworth as a visitor to meet her close friends Allie, Boomer and Liz, and later joins her father and half-sister in a park in a very touching moment; here, in the final scene, a kite is seen flying in the sky, symbolizing, as it had always been a constant in the previous season; Franky's freedom.

== Season 7 ==
In episode 9, Franky comes back to the prison for a visit, she meets up with Liz and is saddened when she doesn't remember her, but Franky tells Liz life has been busy as a legal aid. Franky then talks with Boomer and she tells Boomer that sometimes you have to let family go to be able to move from prison life.

== Reception ==
Nicole da Silva was nominated for awards for her portrayal of the role of Franky Doyle. She has currently won one award for the role. In 2014, da Silva won the award for Most Outstanding Performance in the ASTRA Awards.

In 2015, da Silva was nominated but didn't win another ASTRA or Logie Awards.

In Metro, Franky was compared to Ruby Rose from Orange Is The New Black where Metro said "Ruby Rose is amazing. But sorry, there's only room for one tattooed prison bae in our lives and it's the sassy, vulnerable, tough and sexy Franky Doyle." Metro also commented on the relationship between Franky and Erica by calling it sexy. They also billed Franky and Bea as ruthless top dogs.

FemaleFirst had described Franky as one of the likeable characters within the first season but claimed in the second season that she was on a rougher edge after losing a governor who she was close to.

A scene from "Metamorphosis" was stated to be one of the five lesbian TV moments from 2014. The scene was when Franky stated "I don't eat sausage. I'm a vagitarian."

Elaine Atwell writing for AfterEllen stated about Franky and her absence, "Nicole is an incandescent ball of emotion, and her absence makes it easier to appreciate Danielle's quieter brilliance."

Valerie Anne writing for AfterEllen stated about Bridget and Franky's relationship "I didn't think anything could replace Franky/Erica in my heart...but then along came Bridget. She was everything Franky needed and more."

Ian Hollingshead writing for The Daily Telegraph said about the first episode "The final showdown between Franky (Nicole da Silva) and Jacs (Kris McQuade), a young tattooed lesbian and a schoolmarmish matron, laced with malice as they fought over who would be top dog, was so compelling – and the cliffhanger so agonising – that it would be a crime to miss the next instalment."
