= Joan Ferguson (Wentworth) =

- Wentworth character
- Joan Ferguson as Governor in Seasons 2 & 3
- First appearance: "Born Again" (Season 2, episode 1); 20 May 2014
- Last appearance: "Legacy" (Season 8, episode 20); 26 October 2021
- Created by: Ian Bradley
- Portrayed by: Pamela Rabe; Lucy Dening (flashback)
- Duration: 2014–2017, 2020–2021 (main role); 2018–2019 (special guest) (Note: During the sixth season in 2018, Joan appeared only as a figment of Will Jackson's imagination, as it was not yet known whether she had survived being buried alive. In the seventh season finale, in 2019, Joan appears at the end, where it is revealed that she is alive.)
- Status: Alive
- Crime(s): Conspiracy to Attempted Murder; Conspiracy to Assault; Conspiracy to Murder; Murder; Arson; Aggravated Assault

In-universe information
- Alias: Kath Maxwell
- Nicknames: "The Fixer" (in Blackmoore) "The Freak" (in Wentworth)
- Gender: Female
- Occupation: Governor of Wentworth (2014−2015)
- Affiliation: Nils Jesper; Jake Stewart; Shane Butler; Brenda Murphy
- Family: Major Ivan Ferguson (father)
- Significant other: Jianna Riley
- Nationality: Australian/Russian (b. Russia)

Joan Ferguson is a fictional character in the Australian television series Wentworth, who serves as the main antagonist from season two to season five. Joan is portrayed by actress Pamela Rabe. Her storylines centre on rivalries with Will Jackson, Bea Smith and most staff and inmates. She is introduced in Season 2 as the new Governor of Wentworth Prison following the dismissal of Erica Davidson but becomes a prisoner in Season 4 and remained until the end of the fifth season. The character was presumed dead between the sixth and seventh season, when she was revealed to be alive in the latter. She returned in the eighth and final season.

== Overview ==
During her time as both governor and prisoner, Joan is known for creating major conflicts within Wentworth prison. The second season follows her attempting to gain control over the prison by replacing Franky with Bea in the top dog position. She also turns Will Jackson and Matthew Fletcher against each other in revenge for a past incident with Will.

The third season shows a more psychotic side of Joan as Bea and the inmates turn against her and her vendetta against Will Jackson leads her to being arrested in the last episode. Joan returns to Wentworth as a prisoner in Season 4 and attempts to exonerate herself and end Bea Smith's rule, doing this first by befriending Kaz Proctor and convincing her to murder her star witness, Nils Jesper. When this fails, Joan uses her knowledge of Officer Jake Stewart's actions within the prison to have him kill Nils Jesper. As she walks free, Bea Smith ambushes her in revenge for Joan's attempted murder of Bea's girlfriend, Allie, and thrusts a screwdriver into herself, incriminating Joan for Bea's murder.

Season 5 follows Joan being imprisoned for Bea's murder, as she attempts to bring down Vera Bennett by becoming Top Dog. Allie Novak attempts multiple times to get her revenge on Joan, finally succeeding by having her buried alive by Will Jackson. Throughout the sixth season, Joan appears as a hallucination to Will, taunting him and having him second guess if he succeeded in burying her alive. Will, accompanied by Vera and Jake, goes to undig her grave for closure and if there's a slim chance Joan could have escaped. But they all discover her now lifeless body in the box, and she was believed to be dead until appearing in the closing seconds of the Season 7 finale episode ‘Under Siege Part 2’ confirming she is indeed alive.

== Creation ==
FremantleMedia Director of Drama Jo Porter said “Prisoner offered up a very rich well of amazing characters to draw upon and the Wentworth writers are very excited about revisiting the character of prison officer Joan ‘The Freak’ Ferguson in our second season. It was then announced that Pamela Rabe was going to portray Joan. It was said “In reviving the role of Joan Ferguson, Rabe adds to Wentworth‘s stellar cast and will undoubtedly add new layers to an imposing character…”

=== Characterization ===
The Wentworth website states “Joan’s strength is her determination to succeed against the odds. She found a career in corrections and started as an officer. Her no-nonsense attitude won her fans in high places and she was fast-tracked to Deputy Governor of Queensland’s most troublesome prison, Blackmoore.”

== Backstory ==
Joan was born in Korsakov, Russia, on August 24, 1964. It is unclear how and why she came to Australia. Her deceased father is Ivan Ferguson, who placed very high expectations on her and taught her that emotions would weaken her. In Ivan's eyes, Joan did not sufficiently meet these expectations and he frequently hectored and bullied her as a result. In a Joan centric episode, “The Fixer”, we see that Joan worked in a different prison, and was having a relationship with one of the inmates, Jianna. Jianna's baby was taken away from her, and Joan blamed Will Jackson, then a social worker, for Jianna's death. Joan wasn't aware that, because of their relationship, Jianna was, in fact, killed by the other prisoners.

== Storylines ==
=== Season 2 ===
Joan is introduced at the beginning of the second season when she busts a drug smuggle in the laundry room and introduces herself as governor. After Franky refuses allegiance with her, Ferguson becomes fixed on ending Franky's reign as top dog. She releases Bea and cuts her medication to make Bea lucid and urges her into taking on the top dog position.

Joan lets Doreen start a garden project in the prison and gets prisoners from the men's prison to help with the development. She uses this trust to let Doreen tell her how Bea is and to reveal what prisoner spray painted a derogatory graffiti of Ferguson (the prisoner was Sky Pierson).

Joan later gets Vera drunk to learn about the secrets of the prison, including Fletch's affair with former governor Meg Jackson. She later uses this information to inform Jackson of the affair and then has her thug, Nils Jesper, invade Fletcher's home to make it look like Will invaded his home looking for the diary then has Jackson's home invaded to make it look like Fletch was trying to get the diary back.

Joan gives a "hotshot" to Simmo Slater when she learns that Simmo has to kill Bea Smith, making it look like she had a bad reaction to Franky's drugs. Joan also manipulates Liz into being her informant.

As punishment for Franky's drug trade, Ferguson makes the inmates watch as she bulldozes the whole garden project. Franky confronts Joan over murdering Simmo, at which point Ferguson reveals to her that one of Franky's friends is her informer.

Joan abuses Doreen after finding out she is pregnant. Joan then tries to get Doreen to name Will as being the father. When Doreen refuses, Ferguson murders Doreen's pet bird and tosses it into her cell.

When Derek Channing initiates an investigation into Wentworth Prison in an attempt to get Ferguson removed as Governor, Ferguson finds out from Rachel Singer that Derek is recruiting parolees. She has Nils look into it and finds out he uses the young parolees as a part of his brothels. Ferguson blackmails Derek with this information, forcing him to give her a good word to the board.

When new inmate Kelly Bryant is transferred to Wentworth, she notices Joan immediately and Fletcher confronts her about it. Ferguson then meets with Kelly and has her moved to Bahnhurst prison. In the midst of Bea's escape, Fletch finds out from Bryant that Joan assaulted Kelly to keep her quiet on her relationship with Jianna Butler. Fletch confronts Joan on this, along with the knowledge that she invaded his house and has a vendetta against Will, since he was the social worker that took Jianna's baby away. To keep him quiet, she has Fletch run down outside of Will's house.

Ferguson then demands answers from Doreen, Maxine Conway, Franky and other prisoners as to information where Bea went. Joan later makes out that Bea and Will were complicit and planned the escape. She uses Vera to affirm this accusation since she knows that Vera euthanized her sick mother, at her suggestion. When Bea returns, she addresses Joan as "Freak"

=== Season 3 ===
Joan puts Vera's life at risk during a riot organised by Bea Smith. Joan is later told by Bea "You don’t run this prison. I do!" After the riot, Joan asks Bea what she wants. Bea gets most of her terms met from Joan including pizzas for breakfast. Franky witnesses Joan taking Jodie somewhere while in the slot; She's in the slot herself and hears Jodie next door.

Bea realises that Joan tortured Jodie into shiving her in the yard

Joan visits Fletch and when she learns that Vera has been going to see him behind her back, she calls her trust of Vera into question.

Jodie makes an abuse complaint against Ferguson which blindsides her. Joan isn't happy when Derek can't quash the complaint as it had been made directly to the ombudsman. When realising that Bea had a hand in the complaint, she gets her henchman to drug Bea and drag her into the exercise yard through the tunnels, causing Bea to miss Jodie's hearing. Without Bea at her hearing, Jodie is intimidated at giving evidence and is sent to the psych unit.

Joan has Bea put in the psych unit when Bea's behavior in the exercise yard is mistaken as a psychotic episode. After Vera mentions rumours of Bridget and Franky's relationship, Joan plants a recording device in Bridget's office and hears Franky admitting to killing Meg Jackson.

Joan yet again tortures Jodie, leading Jodie to stab herself in the eye to prevent being moved into the general population. When Bridget accuses Joan of engineering the self-harm, Joan manipulates Vera into writing a statement on Bridget and Franky's relationship and has Bridget resign. Joan later has dinner with Vera, who confronts Joan about the riot incident and how it led Vera to being infected hepatitis C from a dirty syringe that was held to her neck.

Joan turns Will and Franky against each other by sending Will the recording of Franky's confession on his wife's murder. Joan watches Will attack Franky but is enraged when he doesn't kill Franky so that Franky makes parole. Joan then plants drugs in toys that Nash Taylor bring forJoshua in revenge for Doreen making fun of her and to further turn Bea's friends against her.

When Joan believes Vera tried using Jianna as an excuse to unsettle her, she violently slaps Vera and their friendship ends. She reveals Vera's Hep C to all the staff and removes her from deputy governorship. Joan realizes that Fletch witnessed her "talking to air" in a hallucination she was having about her father. She asks Nils to kill Fletch to stop him from revealing her previous murder attempt on him.

In the third-season finale, Joan finds the walls closing in on her. She plants a recording device in the secure spot where Kaz Proctor tells Bea the name of Joan's henchman, Nils Jesper. She calls Nils who is waiting to murder Matthew Fletcher on Joan's command. Joan then listens in to a recording as she notices Bea turning her back on Kaz. Joan is later seen smiling as a news report states that due to an anonymous tip from the prison, Kaz Proctor has been incarcerated at Wentworth. Vera comes in and reveals that she's put in a complaint to the board against Joan. When Doreen's baby Joshua is kidnapped by Jess, Joan sets out to rescue him, just as Jess attempts to kill him; Joan strangles her, setting the prison on fire to cover it up. She learns that her henchman is in police custody by this point. She later blames Jess for starting the fire. After Bea and Will save Ferguson from the fire, Joan is arrested with all the prisoners watching.

=== Season 4 ===
Joan is transferred to Wentworth's protection unit where she is awaiting trial. She tries to manipulate Vera again but fails.

Joan files a petition to be released into general population within the prison. When being assessed by Bridget, Joan reveals Vera's euthanasia of her mother to stop the recording of Joan being used to keep her in protection. Joan is later released into the general population after she blackmails Channing.

When being moved into general population in the prison Joan is subjected to verbal abuse by the other prisoners. Joan speaks with Kaz and tells her not to listen to Bea. She also talks to Doreen and makes her believe that she saved her son, Josh, in the fire and that it was Jess who is responsible for the burning down of H Block. This leads Doreen to protect Joan while she has an airing in the exercise yard. Joan asks Bea to beat her up in the shower so as to give the women what they want. However, while she takes a shower, Joan is brutally raped and attacked by Lucy Gambaro and her gang. Bea, who was on her way to kill Joan, comes to her aid and helps her get dressed. Flashbacks in this episode shows that while in the psychiatric facility she was raped by the doctor who was looking after her. Joan used this assault to get the doctor to give her a clean bill of health.

In the next episode, Joan is shown as a member of Kaz Proctor's crew after blaming her sexual assault on Will Jackson. This leads to an attack on Jackson, where Ferguson aids by telling them where the areas are in the prison without cameras. Joan denies to Bridget and Vera that she has been attacked so she can stay in general. Joan convinces Doreen to blackmail Vera to get her conjugal approved.

When Kaz' dad dies, Joan plants drugs in Allie Novak's cell to get her slotted and give Joan more opportunity to become closer with Kaz. Joan then relays her experiences with her father to get Kaz' trust. Joan then talks to Boomer and tells her she and Maxine would be good at being top dog together. She talks to Lucy Gambaro and her crew to convince them to go after new prisoner, Tasha, in an attempt to steer Lucy's attention off Joan. Joan leads Tasha to the shower, where Tasha pushes the panic button to stop her from being raped. Joan convinces Kaz to stop Maxine from punishing Tasha but Maxine lets Tasha off.

Joan comforts Tasha and saves her life when Tasha tries to kill herself. Joan later discovers that Bea is to be a witness at her trial. Joan then tells Kaz that Nils Jesper is working with Bea to keep Joan in prison. Joan is then seen witnessing Allie and Bea kiss in the kitchen. After Kaz is sentenced to 12 years in prison, Joan offers to kill Bea if Kaz uses her contacts on the outside to kill Nils.

Joan then receives roofies from Tina's Asian crew, testing the tablets out for herself. As Maxine goes for her breast cancer treatment, Joan manipulates Boomer into believing that Vera didn't offer to let Boomer come with Maxine to prison. This causes Boomer to get angry at Vera, leading her to be slotted. With Boomer and Maxine out of the way, Joan has Kaz cause a fight with Bea while she slips the drugs into Bea's drink. While Bea goes to the kitchen to meet with Allie, Kaz takes Allie and the other women to make a stand for Maxine departing alone. Joan uses this distraction to have Bea immobilised by the drugs and attempts to drown her. Meanwhile, Will Jackson finds the phone call that put Kaz Proctor away and it is revealed that it was actually Joan who made the call, claiming to be an inmate at Wentworth so as to plot the idea that Bea Smith turned Kaz into the police. Will shows Kaz the phone call, leading Kaz to angrily fight Joan and thrust her arm in a hot fryer of vegetable oil. Bea is then resuscitated afterwards.

After going to hospital, Joan is moved into protection under medical until her trial. She meets with Jianna's son, Shane Butler, to gain his trust. Joan makes conversation with Jake about Vera. Joan convinces Shane that she is innocent and asks him to kill Nils Jesper. After witnessing Jake dealing drugs with Allie and being under stress when drugs are found in Tina's cell, Joan confronts Jake about his job as a drug dealer. Joan offers to pay him the money he owes to a drug ring if he kills Nils and helps her kill Allie. At the end of the episode, Allie is in the shower by herself when Joan appears behind the mirror, holds her down and injects heroin into her neck, staging a drug overdose.

Before her trial, Joan confronts Bea about Allie, calling her "collateral damage." Although Franky manages to stop Shane from killing Nils, Jake hijacks Nils van and shoots him, setting the van on fire. Joan's charges are dropped and she is released. On her way out, she is confronted by Bea, who plans to kill her due to the attack on Allie. Joan overpowers Bea and takes hold of her screwdriver. Bea then thrusts herself into the screwdriver, making it appear that Joan has killed her.

=== Season 5 ===
Joan is put in the isolation unit of Wentworth following Bea's death. She is then released into the general population at the same time as Allie comes back from the hospital following her overdose. In the exercise yard, Allie and a number of different inmates attack Joan. Joan fights back and proves victorious, taking on all her attackers, snapping an inmates arm and strangling Allie just as she had done to Jess, scaring the other inmates. She believes that Vera was trying to help Bea kill her and conveys this to her lawyer, Jake and Vera herself. Since this is true, Vera makes it appear that Bea had used another officer's card to escape and kill Joan, infuriating her.

When Franky Doyle returns to Wentworth, she meets with Joan and believes that Ferguson framed her for Mike Penisi's murder, since the gun Shane was going to use on Nils Jesper was the one that Mike was shot with. This causes a confrontation in the cafeteria as well as Franky asking Vera to find out who killed Nils Jesper. Joan puts on the teal uniform again in this episode and makes it her goal to have Vera brought down in her job and in her emotional life. Joan lets Top Dog Kaz Proctor know of the drug conduit Tina is using. When Kaz shuts down the drug trade, Joan gains partnership with her crew as well as 'the Boys' when she promises to find a new drug conduit. With Jake Stewart on her side, the women are supplied with more and more drugs, putting a strain on Kaz Proctor's leadership.

Joan focuses on becoming Top Dog and using the position to take down Vera. She has Jake become closer to Vera, moving in with him and throwing her a birthday party, and also makes him have sex with the prison nurse, Mrs Radcliffe. She uses this incident to blackmail the nurse into sabotaging Lucy Gambaro's dentist appointment. As she puts new prisoner Iman into Lucy's orbit and manipulates Lucy into attempting to rape Iman, Kaz Proctor loses support as she refuses to use violence to punish Lucy. Joan cuts out Lucy Gambaro's tongue and has Jake put it in a gift box to give it to Vera as her birthday present. This new move gains the support and fear of the prison inmates, who elect her as the new top dog.

Joan starts her reign by supplying drugs to the women, including Bea's girlfriend Allie, who is actually attempting to use the drugs to hotshot Joan and get her revenge. Joan has Allie burn Bea's old drawing book and the photos left in it in exchange for the drugs. While in the shower, Allie appears to have overdosed and Joan taunts her, stating "If only Bea could see us now." Allie attempts to kill Joan by sticking a syringe filled with drugs in her neck. However, the plan backfires as Joan overpowers Allie and holds the syringe above her neck. Joan instead spares her and states that Bea "died for nothing."

Joan attempts to use the garden project run by Sonia Stevens as an alternative way to bring in drugs. Sonia initially refuses but after Joan convinces her that they are similar, Sonia agrees. Will Jackson has become suspicious of Jake's drug activities and Joan tells him to plant drugs in Will's locker, which Will manages to get rid of. After catching Franky and Allie in the laundry chute, the two kiss to cover up their attempt to escape via the chute. Joan relays this incident to Bridget, who has been struggling with Franky being in prison, causing Bridget to leave.

Jake tells Joan that Will Jackson has convinced Allie to come forward as a witness that Jake is supplying drugs to the prison. Joan has this shut down by having Jake take photos of Franky's younger sister, scaring Franky into thinking her sister will be in danger. Allie then lies when she gives testimony. Joan walks in on Iman attempting to murder Franky, in revenge for Mike Penisi's obsession with Franky that led to his death. Joan saves Franky by overpowering Iman but then snaps Iman's neck in order to prevent the truth of Franky's crime being revealed. Joan claims that Franky killed Iman and she walked in on it. Franky is then charged with Iman's murder and Vera is fired after the incident.

Jake starts to turn against Joan after she asks him to break up with Vera. When he refuses, she tells Vera herself and reveals that their whole relationship was based on Joan's instruction. Vera is emotionally distraught after the incident. While in her cell, Joan is taken and cuffed by the Red Right Hand and Franky, who decide to have Joan taken down. They tie her to the basketball post in the exercise yard and ward off officers by taking Linda Miles hostage. Kaz orders an election for Top Dog and Franky reveals to them all her violent past including Iman's murder, Bea Smith's death, hotshotting Simmo and Allie, torturing Jodie Spiteri, cutting out Lucy Gambaro's tongue and murdering Jess before starting the fire. Joan is then elected out of her top dog decision but before being released, a lynching rope is thrown into the courtyard. Joan is hung up the goal post by the prisoners and almost suffocates until Vera cuts off the rope and gives CPR to Joan, who resuscitates.

Joan is put in the medical unit following the incident but is very quickly released into general by the new Governor Derek Channing, who wishes to have her dead and refuses her requests for security. While Will visits her in her room, she taunts him as being weak after he did nothing following the death of his wife, revealing that she was the one who exposed the truth to him. Joan is put into general population, where she becomes scared for her life following Sonia's poisoning. Jake captures Allie and Franky in the middle of their escape plan. Allie uses her escape to get revenge on Joan and has Jake reveal the plan to her. Joan climbs into the wooden box and awaits to be driven out of the prison in the truck. However, unbeknown to her, a hooded figure takes her away separately, to a secluded woodland, and buries her underground. Hearing the soil being dropped on top of the box, Joan quickly becomes aware that her plan has gone disastrously wrong. She screams for help but is ignored. She tries to break out to no avail. The hooded figure is revealed to be Will Jackson, thus proving he is capable of evil. Lying horizontally underground, Joan suddenly sees Bea's self-portrait nailed above her. Realizing this was Allie's plan all along, she lets out a defeated and terrified scream.

=== Season 6 ===
Wentworth Season 6 general trailers show that Joan Ferguson is haunting Will Jackson for what he did, since he is unsure if Ferguson will stay dead.

Officer Jake Stewart reassures Allie Novak that the Freak is dead, although he has no material proof of it. Ferguson's prisoner photo shot is shown on newspapers posters around the city together with Franky's one in order to warn people of fugitive prisoners.

Vera begins to receive anonymous phone calls and disturbances at her home in which muddy footprints are seen outside her house, a dead bird appears on her doorstep, a brick being thrown through her window, and finally, a pair of black leather gloves on her pillow. At first she becomes convinced that it is Jake, but then realizes it must be Joan as Jake has proof of his whereabouts. Later the pips of her uniform reappear following what she thought was a mix-up at the dry cleaners, which prompts her to remember something that Joan had said in the past, that she was "coming for that shiny little crown" − a reference to the design of a crown on her pips.

Vera, Jake, and a guilty-conscious Will return to the burial site where they dig up the grave. As Will pulls back the wood, a decomposing body is discovered.

=== Season 7 ===
With the fate of Ferguson still left up in the air, she is currently presumed dead, although the outcome of the police investigation DNA results have not been mentioned, nor is it known if they have been confirmed.

In the season finale, Rita Connors is being transferred from Wentworth into protective custody following the siege. Her transport vehicle travels under a bridge where homeless people are keeping warm as a hooded figure amongst them is revealed to be Joan Ferguson, who is alive after all.

=== Season 8 ===
Part 1

Joan is revealed to be living rough, having somehow escaped her burial and now living under the pseudonym Kath Maxwell. She has been tracking Vera for some time, with the intention of abducting her three-month-old daughter, Grace, and starting a new life in Rio. Her plan ultimately fails, however, when a homeless vagrant is curious to know why she shares the same name as his recently missing friend, Kath Maxwell. The man attacks Joan and leaves her for dead.

Two weeks pass, and Joan remains in the hospital in a coma as she suffers from nightmares regarding her burial, when she was governor of Wentworth and her time in the psychiatric hospital. It is later announced that Joan is alive, much to everyone's surprise, especially Vera, Will, Jake, and Allie. Vera goes to identify Joan in the hospital, while it is uncovered that the police knew all along that Joan was alive following the DNA results of the deceased woman in the box, which turned out to be the real Kath Maxwell and they did not announce it to the public as a means of easily recapturing Joan when she least expected it.

In a flashback, it was revealed shortly before Joan was buried alive and made her escape after she was informed by Jake of Franky and Allie's intentions to escape in boxes back in season 5, Joan used a secret phone to contact former officer, Brenda Murphy to follow the van transporting the boxes with Joan and Franky inside, so Murphy could break Joan out. Instead of the original plan of breaking her out of the box, Murphy ended up following Will's truck and from there witnessed Will burying Joan alive. Shortly after Will leaves, Murphy digs up Joan's grave and pulled her to safety. Joan's fingerprints were also found in Murphy's home shortly after Murphy was murdered by Derek Channing.

In order to protect Vera and Grace from Joan, Jake decides to kill her at the hospital. As she continues to dream, Joan's mind battles between the evil Joan Ferguson personality and the vulnerable, weak side of Joan which now takes on the separate Kath Maxwell identity, ultimately burying Ferguson and putting her away for good. As she suddenly awakes, Jake is startled and runs off. Fearing that they will be charged with attempted murder, Vera, Will, and Jake are called to the hospital to find Joan, having no memory of them, believing now that she is, in fact, Kath Maxwell.

Following her recovery, Joan is returned to Wentworth under orders from the Minister. However, not everyone is convinced of her new “Kath Maxwell” persona. New General Manager, Ann Reynolds blackmails former Top Dog, Lou Kelly into protecting Joan from the other prisoners in exchange for Lou's transgender boyfriend, Reb receiving HRT medication. She later comes face-to-face with Allie, who is now Top Dog, who makes a failed attempt in forcing Joan to face up to her past crimes.

Joan begins to undergo therapy sessions with Greg Miller which bring about an adverse effect when Joan begins to have hallucinations of a young girl, and decides to withdraw from the sessions in fear of remembering who she once was. Greg is convinced that Joan has, in fact, lost her memory and believes that she will be released following her upcoming committal hearing as she can't be held responsible for crimes if she cannot remember. Vera, on the other hand, is adamant that Joan is lying and becomes desperate to see that she does not walk free. With Allie's assistance, Vera attempts to oust a confession out of Joan by having her drugged with LSD. Joan begins to have a severe reaction and her hallucinations of the young girl she has been imagining comes to a violent climax, before she is subdued. As she recovers in hospital, the girl appears one last time, uttering the words 'I love you, Mummy', before leaving Joan's mind forever.

Joan is later falsely accused of stealing a mobile phone and money from Lou for which she is accosted, prompting Lou to kill her pet goldfish which Joan stole from Greg's office. The attack evokes a painful memory, where it is revealed that the young girl was actually Joan as a child, witnessing her mother being drowned in a bath by her cruel father. Greg testifies in court in favour of Joan's release, despite pressure from Vera, citing that Joan is suffering from traumatic brain damage. A furious Vera forces Linda Miles to place Joan in a spit hood for which she experiences flashbacks, regaining her memory, proving that she was suffering from amnesia. While looking in the mirror, Joan utters the words "I am Joan Ferguson... I am The Freak".

Part 2

Three weeks pass, and Joan is struggling to keep up the "Kath Maxwell" facade, convinced that her murderous rage is about to re-emerge, especially now that she remembers that Vera, Will and Jake were involved with her burial. Vera is still determined to catch her out by whatever means possible. Joan confides in Greg that her memory has returned and he agrees to keep the information quiet for the fact that he has placed his career in jeopardy in trying to prove to the court that Joan was suffering from memory loss. He unofficially prescribes her an unapproved drug, Psuldrycin, the same one he used to treat Liz Birdsworth for her dementia, in an attempt to contain her anger and help her to express empathy and in the process, aiding her towards her upcoming trial.

Joan's stability is put to the test when Eve Wilder, a former nanny and ex-prisoner of Blackmoore Prison, where Joan was once an officer, arrives at Wentworth, charged with murder and immediately recognises Joan. Suspicious of Joan's claims of memory loss, Eve takes pleasure in informing Marie Winter of how Joan tortured the inmates of Blackmoore, before deciding to play Joan at her own game, for which Joan abruptly stops her in her tracks. Jake admits that he is a fan of Eve's, having followed her website on parenting tips, and asks for her advice for Baby Grace. Eve, in turn, becomes smitten with Jake. For what seems like a friendship forming, Joan is, in fact, using the situation to her advantage, convincing Eve that Jake is attracted to her. At first, using Jake to have items smuggled into the prison, Joan prompts Eve even further, forcing her to make a pass a Jake, an action which isn't reciprocated. Joan feigns sympathy for Eve in an effort to persuade her that Jake must die for stringing her along. Eve informs Joan that the deed has been done and that she has placed Jake's body in a freezer. An ecstatic Joan soon finds the freezer empty and is knocked unconscious by Eve, who has realised that Joan has played her and takes revenge by attempting to lock her inside the freezer. Joan suddenly retaliates; Eve is later found with her left eye missing and is transferred to a psychiatrist instruction, while Jake is located alive. The missing eye turns up in Lou's food.

Joan unintentionally becomes involved in a situation regarding an escape plan orchestrated by Lou Kelly and Judy Bryant, for which Joan is totally oblivious. Rita Connors has suspicions that Lou and Judy are up to something and lags to Will. Lou mistakenly believes that Joan has lagged and, while Joan struggles to contain the urge to fight against Lou, Joan takes her punishment with her hand being steam pressed, so as she doesn't blow her cover. Lou soon discovers that Joan was not the culprit.

As Joan's trial draws closer, the police discover that she had been stalking Vera and Grace prior to her attack by the homeless man, when her collection of photos are found, much to Vera's anger. Her plan is revealed when the photos of Vera, Will and Jake at the shallow grave finally come to light, while, in turn, Vera has obtained official documents from Greg's file that proves Joan has regained her memory. In a final attempt to expose Joan, Vera is suddenly backed into a corner and realises that she will lose Grace if her part in Joan's burial is presented to the court. As the court hearing takes place, Joan is prepared to call Vera's bluff, but suddenly reveals that her memory has returned, ultimately putting an end to her freedom, and also, Greg's career. Vera grows concerned as to why Joan made the confession while the trial was going in Joan's favour and wonders what she has planned.

Joan overhears Lou and Judy discussing their escape plan, which involves bombing the prison. She informs Rita before it's too late, and a brutal fight erupts between Rita and Lou in which they are both placed in the slot when Joan pushes the panic button. Will informs Joan that her time at Wentworth is up and she is to be transferred to a psychiatric hospital, as a type of parting gift authorised by Greg following his dismissal. The bomb eventually explodes throwing what remains of Wentworth into chaos. Vera discovers that Ann Reynolds knew for sometime about the bomb and prevented it from being disarmed as a means of having Judy Bryant in the area of detonation, thus having her killed. Vera fights for her life when Ann tries to silence her by strangling her. Joan, having survived the blast, pulls Ann off Vera and snaps her neck, killing her. Joan carries Vera to safety outside the prison, and reveals that she saved her so that Grace would not be deprived of a mother. Joan smiles and walks away, disappearing into the night. When unaccounted for, it is believed that Joan was killed in the explosion. Vera, grateful for what Joan did, decides to remain quiet about Joan's escape.

== Reception ==
=== Critical reception ===
Joan Ferguson has been described as “arguably the biggest villain within the Wentworth walls.”. Gay Times described Ferguson as a “formidable governor”, they also said “Straight edged, hair back and a stern face, Joan Ferguson is a force to be reckoned with”

Reveal Magazine billed Joan as “The dreaded Joan Ferguson” when talking about the episode Born Again.

Metro said, "Joan 'The Freak' Ferguson isn't just the most terrifying character in all prison dramas - she's the baddest and most sinister baddie ever to grace TV."

Graeme Blundell of the Australian wrote "So much awe surrounds Ferguson that she seems to possess supernatural powers, a Hannibal Lecter-like superhuman cunning and lack of empathy, though Rabe, a performer of unerring grace and authenticity, is such an accomplished actress she avoids the melodrama, turning Ferguson into one of the most believable villains we’ve seen on the local screen."

=== Accolades ===
Pamela Rabe has received several award nominations for her portrayal of Joan Ferguson.

She won the AACTA Award for her performance in Season 3 of Wentworth in 2015, followed by nominations in both 2016 and 2017.

In 2015, she received an Astra Award nomination for her portrayal in the series.

In 2016, she was nominated for a Logie Award in the category "Most Outstanding Actress" for her portrayal of Joan Ferguson., before winning the award in 2018, for her performance in the fifth season.
