= Jacs Holt =

Character in the TV series Wentworth

- Wentworth Prison character
- First appearance: "No Place Like Home"
- Last appearance: "Born Again"
- Created by: Lara Radulovich
- Portrayed by: Kris McQuade
- Status: Deceased; murdered by Bea Smith.
- Duration: 2013
- Episode Count: 10
- Crime: Murder
- Sentence: 14 years (served 7)

In-universe information
- Full name: Jacqueline Holt
- Nickname: Jacs
- Occupation: Gangster; Career Criminal
- Affiliation: Simone "Simmo" Slater; Vera Bennett
- Family: Brayden Holt (son)
- Significant other: Vinnie Holt (husband)
- Nationality: Australian

Jacqueline Holt is a character in Wentworth and serves as the main antagonist in the first season. Jacs was notable for being the first known top dog in Wentworth and for her rivalries with Franky Doyle and Bea Smith. Jacs was portrayed by Kris McQuade.

== Background ==
The Wentworth website states, "Late 50s, Jacs served 7 years of a 14 year sentence for murder. She was the top dog staring down her ‘use-by’ date as both a woman and powerbroker. A long-termer at Wentworth, Jacs was born into a crime family before becoming the matriarch of her own when she married Vinnie Holt. She lacked empathy and compassion, and used physical violence and fear to control others. It was all about power for Jacs, and she played a long strategic game to get it and keep it. An astute judge of character, Jacs had an uncanny ability to zero in on a person’s vulnerabilities and use it against them. But Jacs felt the years catching up, and her physical strength and stamina wasn't what it used to be. That meant playing a tougher and smarter game to stay at the top."

== Storylines ==
In "No Place Like Home", Jacs is first shown in the slot singing On the Inside. Jacs gets released early by Meg Jackson and makes a joke out of Bea Smith and verbally abuses Franky Doyle.

In "The Girl Who Waited", Jacs meets with Vinnie when he is released from prison. Jacs is angry that Vinnie has a new woman. At the end of the episode, Jacs forces Bea to burn Franky’s hand on the steam press.

In "The Velvet Curtain", Jacs and Franky’s rivalry escalates and Jacs is unimpressed when she sees Liz Birdsworth sitting drunk instead of working.

In "Something Dies", Jacs has Bea beaten up because Bea begged her not to gangrape Franky. When Jacs gets Franky alone, Franky over powers her and breaks her hand on the weights.

In "Mind Games", it is shown into Jacs’ past. Jacs and Vinnie murdered a man who was going to carry out a hit on Vinnie on Brayden’s birthday. In the present, Jacs has a visit from Vinnie who tells her to accept Erica’s offer of going into protection. Later, Jacs orders Brayden to kill Debbie.

In "Checkmate", Jacs admits to Bea that she had Brayden murder Debbie. Bea gets very angry and stabs Jacs in the neck with a pen, killing her almost instantly.

In "Born Again", Bea has a hallucination of Jacs when high on sedatives.

Jacs is mentioned by Boomer in episode one of Season 8

== Reception ==
McQuade was nominated for Best Guest or Supporting Actress in a Television Drama in the AACTA Awards.

McQuade has also been nominated for an ASTRA Award.

In an interview McQuade stated that she wished TV Dramas would stop killing her character off.

A reviewer had said "Kris McQuade and Danielle Cormack’s last scene together was enthralling with Jacs baiting Bea until Bea inevitably snaps. It was a sobering moment watching Bea walk trance like to the distress button and press it with her bloody hand." The reviewer had also noted that Jacs's death was "almost expected".

Ian Hollingshead writing for The Telegraph said about the first episode "The final showdown between Franky (Nicole da Silva) and Jacs (Kris McQuade), a young tattooed lesbian and a schoolmarmish matron, laced with malice as they fought over who would be top dog, was so compelling – and the cliffhanger so agonising – that it would be a crime to miss the next instalment."
