= Kaz Proctor =

- Wentworth character
- First appearance: "The Governor’s Pleasure"; 7 April 2015
- Last appearance: "Ascension"; 25 June 2019
- Portrayed by: Tammy MacIntosh; Isabella Garwoli (flashback)
- Duration: 2015-2019
- Crime(s): Aggravated assault Assault; Kidnapping; Murder, Attempted Murder
- Sentence: 25 years

In-universe information
- Full name: Karen Proctor
- Family: Faith Proctor (mother); Jim Proctor (father)

Karen "Kaz" Proctor is a main character in the television series Wentworth. Kaz is introduced as one of Bea's supporters and is in a vigilante group called The Red Right Hand. Kaz is portrayed by Tammy MacIntosh. Kaz's main storylines have centred on her idolizing of Bea Smith and being a vigilante against men who abuse women.

== Characterization and backstory ==
The SoHo Wentworth website states, "At first just a rowdy onlooker during Bea’s sentencing, Kaz Proctor is a perfect example of a dangerous effect just waiting for a cause. Damaged by growing up in a dysfunctional household with a violent and sexually abusive father, further scarred by experiences with angry boyfriends, she’s come to believe all her problems are caused by the violence men inflict on women. Her intensity and hair-trigger temper make her a pretty difficult partner, and she's got a string of failed and acrimonious relationships behind her to prove it."

In the episode "Love and Hate", Kaz's past is shown. It is revealed that Kaz was sexually assaulted as a child by her father, and that her mother doesn't believe her.

== Storylines ==
Kaz is first seen yelling support at Bea Smith outside the courthouse after Bea's sentencing. Bea later receives a letter from Kaz which she ignores until she then sees a news report that is linking her to Kaz’s criminal activities. Kaz later visits Bea in prison and is offended when Bea tells her not to commit crimes in her name again, Kaz yells at the prison officers about them turning Bea against her. Will Jackson confronts Kaz when he believes that she could have murdered Harry Smith. Offscreen, it is believed that Kaz plants Harry's murder weapon at Will Jackson’s house and tips off the police. Weeks later Bea requests to see Kaz because she has DNA of someone who attacked her. Bea promises that Kaz and her vigilante group can go after the attacker. In the season finale, Bea gets the name of Ferguson’s henchman from Kaz and then betrays Kaz by telling her she doesn’t care about Kaz’s group. Kaz threatens Bea. Later on it is saw on a news report that Kaz has been arrested. Kaz is then seen entering Wentworth as a prisoner and she threatens to kill Bea.

Kaz meets with Bea in the laundry and gives her a bottle of alcohol to welcome her back to Wentworth. Kaz then later protests against the voluntary contraception that was being offered to the prisoners. When the conjugal visits are declined, Kaz makes plans and causes a nudity riot in the exercise yard. When Will tries to tackle her to the ground she punches him between the legs and he fights back. Vera later tells Kaz that she has no case when she is threatening to sue the prison. Kaz and Allie (Kate Jenkinson) watch as Ferguson (Pamela Rabe) is brought into the general population. Kaz discusses with her crew that Ferguson has been placed amongst them as they have no history with her. Kaz is then ordered to make Ferguson a cup of tea; Ferguson then tells her not to listen to Bea. Kaz took center stage in her own flashback episode where it focused on her grieving for her sexually abusive father. Kaz is sentenced to 12 years for her crimes. Bridget Westfall (Libby Tanner) tries to talk to Kaz about the sentencing but Kaz just loses her temper. That evening, Joan admits to Kaz that she wants to kill Bea. Joan and Kaz put their plan into action. Kaz feels guilty about killing a woman but decides to go through with it. Joan waits until Maxine has left for treatment and she angers Boomer causing her to get slotted. Kaz creates a distraction, using Maxine as her example (Maxine left the prison with just a guard and no other prisoner). Meanwhile Joan uses Bea and Allie's growing relationship to her advantage. She drugs Bea with sedatives, and locks her in a cupboard in the kitchen. She tries to drown Bea in the sink. Kaz finds out that Joan dobbed her into the police not Bea, she rushes to the kitchen and attacks Joan, she burns her hand in the Deep Fat Fryer. Allie pulls Bea out of the water and tries to resuscitate her. Kaz is restrained by Mr Stewart after trying to strangle Joan. In episode 9, Kaz is in the slot, she is released back into the general population after a week. Allie is almost attacked by Boomer for Kaz's involvement in the attack on Bea. Kaz goes to Bea and tries to tell her Allie had nothing to do with it but, Bea goads Kaz for protecting Joan, and Kaz, angered by this, tells Bea that Allie was the bait in the whole attack. Allie hits Kaz after finding out what she said to Bea. Kaz tells Bea she can have Allie as she no longer wants anything to do with her.

In episode 10, Kaz looks after Allie after her relapse. In episode 11, Kaz creates a plan to take Bea down from the position of top dog after seeing Bea and Allie together as a couple. Kaz and Tina form an alliance to take Bea down. Bea however constructs her own downfall by lagging on Tina for bringing drugs into the prison. During episode 12, Kaz and Bea fight over the attack on Allie orchestrated by Ferguson. Kaz takes on the position of top dog and tells Bea she won't let the girls down.

Season 5 begins with the aftermath of the death of Bea Smith. Ferguson is released into the general population and Kaz says no one is to have any contact with her, she's a ghost. Many women defy her and Ferguson takes them all out. The woman laugh at Kaz when she doesn't feel the need to punish the women or Ferguson over the attack in the yard.

A few weeks later, Kaz is on her way to her sentence appeal with Will Jackson and another prison guard when the van suddenly crashes into a river due to the tyre bolts being loosened by Franky Doyle, as she thought her trial hearing was that day so she would be in the van and therefore end up in hospital in an attempt to free herself from Wentworth and prove her innocence. Will risks his own life and almost drowns while saving Kaz from the back of the van, and the two finally reach safety and go to hospital, with Kaz walking away with just a minor head injury and a broken arm. On their arrival back at Wentworth, she thanks Will for saving her life and tells him things could possibly be different between the two of them from there on.

Kaz loses the position of Top Dog to Joan Ferguson in Episode 6 of Season 5. At the end of the fifth season, Kaz tries Ferguson in a Kangaroo Court and regains the Top Dog position. She then attempts to kill Ferguson in the finale, only to discover she escaped with Franky through the Greenwall Project.

At the beginning of Season 6, Kaz keeps on guard believing that Ferguson will be back. She punished newbie Rita Connors for beating up Spike, only later to find out it was Ruby who attacked her. When Marie arrives in the prison Kaz is unhappy to see her. She later uncovers that Liz may have Alzheimer's due to Sonia's manipulation of her. She takes Sonia aside and tells her she'll be tried the day before her release. In episode 7 of season 6, a fight happens on the roof between Liz and Sonia. Kaz runs up to the roof and after a struggle, pushes Sonia over the edge, thus killing her. Kaz is later charged with manslaughter and her sentence is then extended from 12 years to 25 years. In episode 4 of season 7, Kaz is murdered by corrupt prison officer Sean Brody.

== Reception ==
A reviewer for AfterEllen said, "I have a femur to pick with the Red Right Hand storyline. Kaz/Karen Proctor, the woman behind the campaign of violence/poorly constructed ski masks is an offensive caricature. While I give credit to the actor playing her—there is a wildfire of crazy raging behind that woman’s eyes—the concept of "feminism out of control" is Not A Thing."

In a review for the Season Three finale, Kaz is described as both a "loony violent woman" and "the crazed vigilante".

Elaine Atwell, writing for AfterEllen said, "Now I gotta say, I was skeptical about Kaz’s ability to compete with the terrifying villains of seasons past. No one could be a grande dame of infamy quite like Jaqs Holt, no one could hide madness behind such an innocent exterior like Jess, and of course we all love following The Freak down her 79-Step Revenge Plots/Fencing Regimens/JIANNA IS THAT YOU. But this episode, I came to fear Kaz Proctor in her own very specific way, due largely to the toxic intensity brought to the role by Tammy Macintosh" she went on to state, "Like, even just one episode in, Kaz emanates an electricity that feels like standing too near a power station. She hums with it. Her face is tight with it". Atwell concluded her review about Kaz by saying, "And to make her even more dangerous, she has adopted the language of social justice in a way that has the attention of the other women. She calls them “strong women,” she speaks of “abusers and abused.” She encourages them not to take part in a voluntary free birth control program because they control their own bodies. She is basically my nightmare internet commenter come to life. If she said the words “Faking It,” I think I would slam my laptop shut in terror. She's a real good villain, is what I’m saying, and she also bears many of the hallmarks of borderline personality disorder; meaning that she see's [sic] 90% of people as faceless pawns and the remaining 10% as people to be either desperately loved or hated. And she HATES Bea."

When talking about Kaz's flashback episode, Atwell for AfterEllen stated, "Tammy MacIntosh's performance is as mesmerizing and terrifying as a wildfire, and she never lets up for a single second."
