= Kate Jenkinson =

Australian actress (born 1981)

- Born: Kate Ellen Jenkinson; 24 August 1981 (age 45); Perth, Western Australia
- Other name: Jenko
- Occupation: Actress
- Years active: 2004–present
- Known for: Wentworth
- Partner: Nathan Harding
- Children: 1

Kate Ellen Jenkinson (born 24 August 1981) is an Australian actress, known for her various roles on The Wedge, as well as her role of Kendall Quinn on Super Fun Night. She is known for her role as Allie Novak in the Australian TV series Wentworth.

== Education ==
Jenkinson graduated from Western Australian Academy of Performing Arts in 2004, winning the Nigel Rideout Award and has since been working constantly in drama and comedy on both stage and screen.

== Career ==
In 2005, Jenkinson was nominated for the Best Newcomer Award for her role as Julia in the Black Swan State Theatre Company production of Zastrozzi and was a regular on the TV comedy series The Wedge from 2005 to 2007. She appeared as herself on Thank God You're Here from 2006 to 2007, as well as Forgotten Cities, a new pilot for Working Dog Productions.

In 2007, she was in an episode of Shaun Micallef's Newstopia and had a lead guest role on the Channel 9 drama series, Canal Road. She began 2008 in the Melbourne Theatre Company's production of Don Juan in Soho before commencing as a regular on SBS's Bogan Pride and guest roles on Rush, Satisfaction, Tangle, and Whatever Happened to That Guy?. In 2013, she joined the cast of fellow Australian Rebel Wilson's TV series Super Fun Night. In 2015, she played Carol, the daughter of the title character in Shaun Micallef's sitcom The Ex-PM.

In 2015, Jenkinson joined the cast of Wentworth as prison inmate Allie Novak, and in season 8 (2020), she became a 'top dog' of the prison.

In 2019, Jenkinson joined the cast of Australian medical drama, Doctor Doctor (known as The Heart Guy internationally). She played the role of Tara Khourdair during the fourth season, which commenced filming in April 2019, and aired from February to May 2020.

In 2023 Jenkinson reprised the role of Mel for season four of Five Bedrooms.

== Personal life ==
Jenkinson lives with her partner Nathan and their two rescue dogs, Bowie and Bruno. In 2021 they had their first child, a son.

She was previously in a same-sex relationship.

In late 2025, Jenkinson announced that she was releasing a cook book titled 'Half Baked' based on the success of her cooking segments on social media.

== Theatre ==
Year	Title	Role	Notes	Ref
2005	Zastrozzi	Julia	Black Swan Theatre, Perth	
2008	Don Juan in SoHo	Mattie/Dalia	Melbourne Theatre Company	
2009	Secret Bridesmaids Business	Naomi	Kay + McLean Productions	
2010	The Graduate	Elaine Robinson	Kay + McLean Productions	

== Filmography ==
=== Television ===
Year	Title	Role	Notes	Ref
2006–2007	The Wedge	Various	48 episodes	
2007	Forgotten Cities	Various		
2007	Newstopia	Amanda	1 episode	
2008	Canal Road	Felicity	1 episode	
2008	Bogan Pride	Tizneen	6 episodes	
2008–2009	Rush	Nina Wise	4 episodes	
2009	Whatever Happened to That Guy?	IVF Nurse	1 episode	
2009–2010	Satisfaction	Jemima	4 episodes	
2009–2012	Tangle	Melanie	6 episodes	
2010	City Homicide	Lara Conlon	1 episode	
2010	Wilfred	Caddy	1 episode	
2010–2012	Lowdown	Samantha	5 episodes	
2011	Killing Time	Wendy Peirce	6 episodes	
2011–2013	Offspring	Kate Reid	23 episodes	
2012	The Straits	Antoinette Montebello	9 episodes	
2012	Miss Fisher's Murder Mysteries	Isabella	1 episode	
2012	Home and Away	Mackenzie Watson	2 episodes	
2012	House Husbands	Nadine Nadir	6 episodes	
2013	The Time of Our Lives	Eloise	8 episodes	
2013–2014	Super Fun Night	Kendall Quinn	16 episodes	
2015	Hiding	Rebecca Swift / Maree Quigg	8 episodes	
2015, 2017	The Ex-PM	Carol	12 episodes	
2016	Beat Bugs	Tawny Owl	1 episode	
2016–2021	Wentworth	Allie Novak	Regular role (season 4–8), 66 episodes	
2018	True Story with Hamish & Andy	Michelle	1 episode	
2018	Olivia Newton-John: Hopelessly Devoted to You	Pat Carroll	Miniseries, 2 episodes	
2019	Doctor Doctor	Tara Khourdair	8 episodes	
2019	Get Krack!n	Catherine McLeod	1 episode	
2019–2023	Five Bedrooms	Melanie Best	14 episodes	
2021	Wentworth: The Fall Girl	Allie Novak	Podcast series	
2021	Amazing Grace	Grace Cresswell	8 episodes	
2022	Shaun Micallef's Mad as Hell	Various characters	3 episodes	
2023–2025	NCIS: Sydney	Rebecca Dempsey	2 episodes	
2024	Roast Night	Susan Turner	6 episodes	
2026	Monarch: Legacy of Monsters	Gwynn	2 episodes (2.2 'Resonance'), (2.4)	
2026	Who The Hell is Hamish?	TBA	TV series	

=== Films ===
Year	Title	Roles	Notes
TBA	Love, Wine & Valentine	Jess	Film
2026	Runner	Bird Lady	Film
2024	A Vintage Christmas	Darla	Film
2014	The Heckler	Bree	
2012	Stuffed	Andie	TV short

=== Other appearances ===
Year	Title	Role	Notes
2021	Wentworth: Unlocked	Self	TV special
2019	Wentworth: Behind the Bars	Self	TV special
2018	Have You Been Paying Attention?	Guest Quiz Master	
2018	Talkin Bout Your Generation	Herself	
2012	Agony Aunts	Herself	
2006–2007	Thank God You're Here	Herself	

== Awards ==
Year	Organisation	Award	Notes
2004	Nigel Rideout Award	Teacher's Choice	WAAPA
2005	Equity Benevolent Guild	Best Newcomer Nominee	Zastrozzi
2013	Australians in Film	Finalist	Heath Ledger Scholarship
