= Tammy MacIntosh =

Australian actress

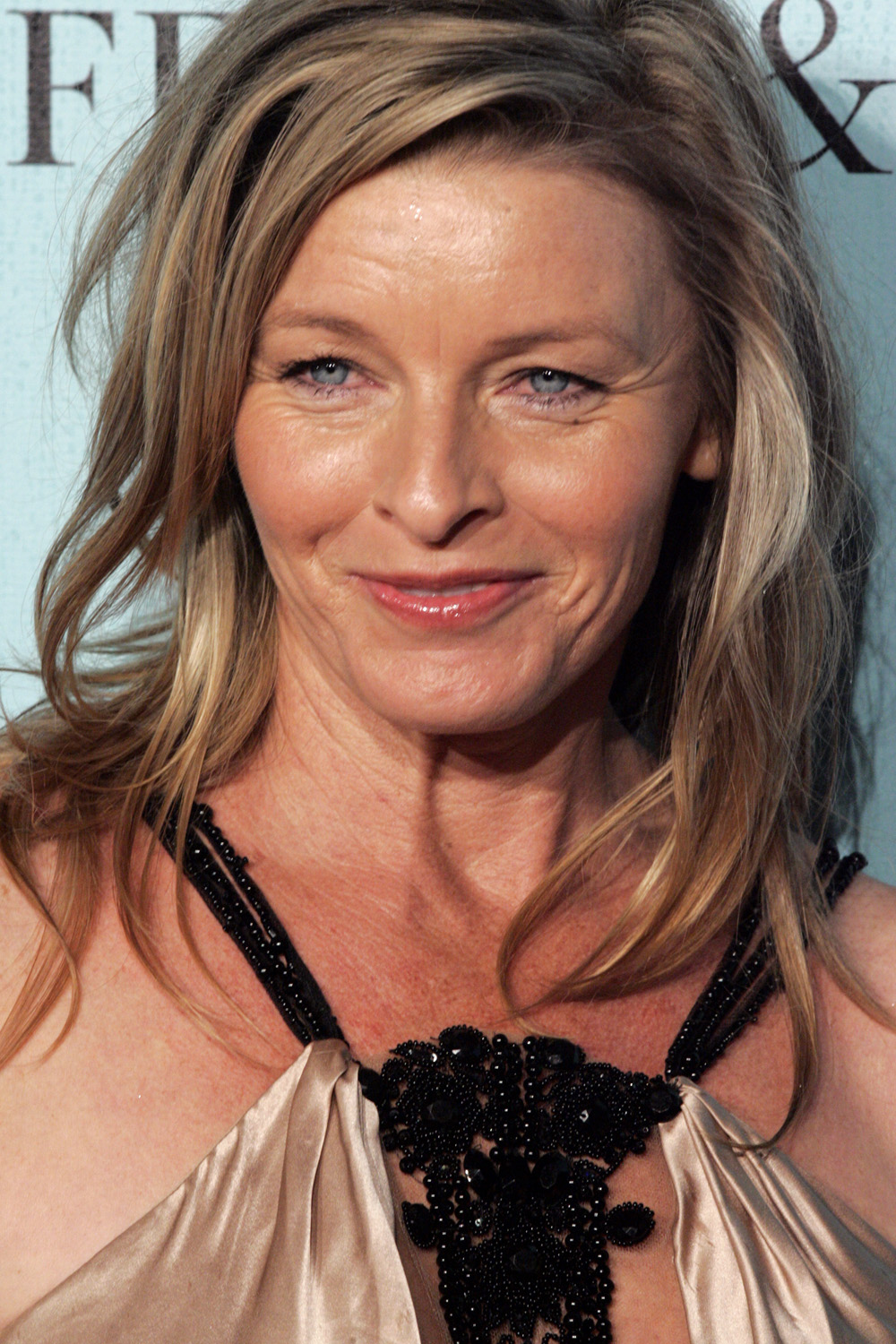
- MacIntosh at the premiere of The Great Gatsby in 2013.
- Born: 16 February 1970 (age 56); Perth, Western Australia, Australia
- Education: Morley Senior High School, Girrawheen Senior High School, Mount Lawley Senior High School
- Alma mater: Edith Cowan University (Western Australian Academy of Performing Arts)
- Occupation: Actress
- Years active: 1986–present
- Known for: All Saints; Sea Patrol; Wentworth
- Spouse: Mark Yeats (m. 2005)
- Children: 1

Tammy MacIntosh (born 16 February 1970) is an Australian actress known for portraying Dr. Charlotte Beaumont in the medical drama All Saints and Jool in the TV series Farscape. She is also known for her roles on television series The Flying Doctors, Police Rescue, Sea Patrol, the television film McLeod's Daughters which led to the acclaimed drama series of the same title, and played the role of Kaz Proctor in the prison drama series Wentworth, until her departure in June 2019.

== Early and personal life ==
MacIntosh was born on 16 February 1970 in Perth, where she attended Morley Senior High School, Girrawheen Senior High School and Mount Lawley Senior High School. MacIntosh graduated from the Western Australian Academy of Performing Arts, a division of Edith Cowan University.

MacIntosh is married to Mark Yeats and they have a son.

== Career ==
MacIntosh started out as a reporter for children's show C'mon Kids in South Australia in the late eighties.

MacIntosh has an extensive list of TV credits including The Flying Doctors, Christine Rutherford in Something in the Air, Grass Roots, Stingers, State Coroner, Wildside, McLeod's Daughters, G.P., The Feds III, and Chances. She was also a well-known face in her regular role of Kathy in Police Rescue. MacIntosh played a main character in the first season of the BAFTA Award-winning BBC show, Jeopardy.

In 1998, MacIntosh appeared in the detective series Good Guys, Bad Guys. MacIntosh joined the science fiction television series Farscape in late 2000. She was cast as Jool, a young Interion woman. She made her first appearance in the third-season episode "Self-Inflicted Wounds Part I: Could'a, Would'a, Should'a".

In 2002, MacIntosh was cast as Dr Charlotte Beaumont in the medical drama All Saints. MacIntosh took the role of Charlotte as she saw the character as a new challenge. She was initially contracted for six weeks. Of Charlotte, MacIntosh commented "she's been empowering to play. I felt much stronger and more confident in who I was than I had in a long time." MacIntosh became one of the show's longest serving cast members joining in series 5 and staying until its final season went to air.

Macintosh's film and theatre credits include Police Rescue: The Movie, the Melbourne Theatre Company's Shark Fin Soup, the Sydney Theatre Company's Private Lives, the Ensemble Theatre's Blinded by the Sun and Sleeping Beauty.

She had a recurring role on Sea Patrol portraying Commander Maxine "Knocker" White. She also played Doctor Elizabeth "Mac" Macmillan in ABC's crime drama Miss Fisher's Murder Mysteries, and Doctor Amelia Ward in "Episode 9" of Crownies.

MacIntosh was considered for the role of Bea Smith in prison drama Wentworth. She later joined the cast in the third season as vigilante Kaz Proctor, alongside actresses Pia Miranda and Libby Tanner. MacIntosh left Wentworth in season 7 as the show took a toll on her. Macintosh revealed the extent of filming would leave her "crying while going on walks" and she would facetime her son every night during production. MacIntosh spoke with the production team at the end of season six to inform them that the upcoming seventh season would be her last as Kaz. Her character was killed off in the fourth episode.

Macintosh would join several of her co-stars from Wentworth during 2022 and appeared at both a Screen Star Event in London and Birmingham and would also appear at the Wentworth Con fan convention in Melbourne. Macintosh appears regularly at these fan conventions.

MacIntosh made a cameo appearance in The Drover's Wife and appeared in The Longest Weekend. In 2024, Macintosh reunited with Guy Pearce in the film Inside.

In May 2025, MacIntosh made a return to television after a six-year absence as Debra Fowler in soap opera Home and Away.

== Filmography ==
=== Film ===
Year	Title	Role	Notes
1993	The Feds: Betrayal	Nicola Bass	Television film
1994	Police Rescue	Const. Kathy Orland	Feature film
1996	River Street	Sharon Pierce	Feature film
1996	Whipping Boy	Seal	Television film
1996	McLeod's Daughters	Claire McLeod	Television film
2000	Better Than Sex	Girl F	Feature film
2005	Repetition	Anell	Feature film
2011	A Heartbeat Away	Grace Flack	Feature film
2011	Sleeping Beauty	Work Colleague	Feature film
2021 (22)	The Drovers Wife	Marti Murray	Feature film (cameo)
2022	The Longest Weekend	Sadie Palmer	Feature film
2024 (25)	Inside	Colleen Quillinan	Feature film

=== Television ===
Year	Title	Role	Notes
1989–1990	The Flying Doctors	Annie Rogers	Seasons 6–7 (recurring role, 37 episodes)
1991	Chances	Mandy Foster	Season 1 (6 episodes)
1992–1993	Bingles	Stacy	Season 1 (main role, 23 episodes)
1992–1995	Police Rescue	Const. Kathy Orland	Seasons 2–4 (main role, 39 episodes)
1995	G.P.	Joanna Lalor	Season 7, Episode 33: "One for the Road"
1997–1998	Wildside	Det. Kim Devlin	Miniseries & Season 1 (recurring role, 12 episodes)
1998	Good Guys, Bad Guys	Holly Swift	Season 2, Episode 13: "You Light Up My Wife"
1999	Stingers	Karen Jones	Season 2, Episode 19: "Full Term"
2000	Grass Roots	Marilyn Hennessy	Season 1 (recurring role, 4 episodes)
2000	Something in the Air	Christine Rutherford	Season 1 (recurring role, 8 episodes)
2001–2002	Farscape	Joolushko 'Jool' Tunai Fenta Hovalis	Seasons 3–4 (recurring role, 18 episodes)
2002	Jeopardy	Melissa	Season 1 (recurring role, 13 episodes)
2002–2009	All Saints	Dr. Charlotte Beaumont	Seasons 5–12 (main role, 289 episodes)
2004	Farscape: The Peacekeeper Wars	Joolushko 'Jool' Tunai Fenta Hovalis	Miniseries (2 episodes)
2010–2011	Sea Patrol	CMDR Maxine "Knocker" White	Seasons 4–5 (recurring role, 29 episodes)
2011	East West 101	Sally Wilson	Season 3, Episode 2: "Heart of Darkness"
2011	Crownies	Dr. Amelia Ward	Season 1, Episode 9
2012–2015	Miss Fisher's Murder Mysteries	Dr. Elizabeth "Mac" Macmillan	Seasons 1–3 (recurring role, 17 episodes)
2015–2019	Wentworth	Karen "Kaz" Proctor	Season 3 (recurring role, 5 episodes), Seasons 4–7 (main role, 41 episodes)
2019	Wentworth: Behind the Bars	Self	TV Special
2025–present	Home and Away	Debra Fowler	Season 38-39 (recurring)

== Theatre ==
Year	Title	Role	Notes
1998	Blinded by the Sun		Playhouse Theatre
	Private Lives		Sydney Theatre Company
	Shark Fin Soup		Melbourne Theatre Company
