= Bea Smith (Wentworth) =

- Wentworth character
- First appearance: "No Place Like Home"
- Last appearance: "Seeing Red"
- Created by: Reg Watson
- Portrayed by: Danielle Cormack
- Duration: 2013–2016
- Status: Deceased; murdered by Joan Ferguson
- Crime(s): Attempted murder Manslaughter; Murder; Aggravated assault Drug Trafficking
- Sentence: Life without parole

In-universe information
- Full name: Beatrice Alice Smith
- Nicknames: "Red" "Queen Bea"
- Occupation: Hairdresser
- Affiliation: Allie Novak; Will Jackson; Maxine Conway; Franky Doyle; Susan "Boomer" Jenkins; Vera Bennett; Linda Miles; Matthew Fletcher; Kaz Proctor; Doreen Anderson
- Spouse: Harry Smith (deceased)
- Significant other: Allie Novak (soulmate)
- Children: Debbie Smith (deceased)
- Nationality: Australian

Bea Smith is a fictional character from the Australian television drama Wentworth, portrayed by Danielle Cormack. She was introduced in the first episode of the series "No Place Like Home", broadcast in May 2013. Bea is notable for her storylines of being abused by her husband Harry, avenging the death of her daughter by murdering Brayden Holt and being the top dog in Wentworth Prison. Bea has had rivalries with Franky Doyle, Jacs Holt, Kaz Proctor and Joan Ferguson. Bea was the central character in Wentworth until her exit at the end of Season 4.

== Casting ==
Tammy MacIntosh was one of the favourites to play the role, but did not secure the part. She later joined the cast in Season 3 as vigilante Kaz Proctor. New Zealand actress Danielle Cormack was eventually cast as Bea. She commented that she was "absolutely rapt" to join the cast and hoped the show would be just as popular as Prisoner was.

During the last episode of the fourth season, Bea was killed off after being stabbed multiple times by Joan Ferguson (Pamela Rabe). Producers confirmed that the character had been written out "for dramatic purposes" and would not be returning for the show's fifth season. The show's executive producer, Jo Porter, stated: "It is always an incredibly difficult decision to say farewell to a much-loved and revered character like Bea Smith. This is why this storyline has had such a huge impact on us all and we are sure fans will feel the same. This decision was particularly hard as it meant also saying goodbye to Danielle Cormack." Porter added that Bea's departure would allow for new characters and stories to take center stage during the fifth season.

== Storylines ==
Bea was a devoted wife to Harry and loving mother to Debbie. Bea was being abused and raped by Harry but stayed because she didn't want to upset Debbie. One day Bea tried to murder Harry and make it look like suicide, which eventually led to her arrest.

Bea's arrival at Wentworth led to her needing to be sedated, after panicking about whether her daughter Debbie was safe. When she woke up in the morning, she was taken to her cell by Vera Bennett, and then shown around the place by Liz Birdsworth. Not long after her arrival, Bea started to have flashbacks about her home life, leading to her crime. She tried to kill her husband, Harry, after being beaten one morning. She knocked him out, and then dragged him to the car where she taped his hands to the steering wheel, head to the headrest, and then put a hose, running from the exhaust, in the car to suffocate him. Her daughter came home early and tried to get into the garage. Bea stopped her from opening the door, but Debbie got into the garage through the side door. Alarmed at the scene, she tried saving Harry. Bea stopped her, and then finally realising her actions, told Debbie to call for an ambulance as she took off the tape from his wrist and face. Bea is sent to Wentworth on remand.

Bea was also accused of murdering Meg Jackson during the riot between Franky and Jacs' gangs, as she was found covered in blood after tripping over Meg's body. Police later cleared her of the charges.

In The Velvet Curtain, Bea tries exploring her body at the end of the episode after Liz told her to. It was also revealed that Bea only had sex whenever Harry wanted to and that she got no joy from it.

In Something Dies, Bea begs Jacs not to gangrape Franky, by doing so Jacs had her thugs carry out a beating on Bea. Bea managed to warn Franky, who, as a result, smashed Jacs hand under some weight. Bea's involvement in the power struggle between Franky and Jacs had serious consequences. In retaliation, Jacs had her son, who was dating Debbie at the request of his mother, give Debbie a fatal hotshot.

In "To The Moon", Bea learns that her daughter Debbie has died of a drugs overdose. Bea is devastated and tries hanging herself, only to be stopped by Liz with the help of Boomer, Franky and Doreen. Erica is unable to let Bea attend the funeral because she is on remand and a high risk inmate, so Will Jackson goes to the morgue and passes a message on to Debbie's body for Bea. This is where we hear Will telling Debbie that Bea "loves her to the moon and back".

When Bea confronts Jacs in her cell wanting to know the truth behind what happened to Debbie, she becomes enraged when Jacs condones what she had done. Bea then stabs Jacs in the neck with a pen causing her to bleed out and die. After this, she presses the panic button, and is escorted away by two guards as her fellow inmates watch in shock and confusion. This scene contrasts Bea entering the prison in 1x01 being escorted by guards.

In season 2 it is confirmed that she had killed Jacs and that her original charges of Attempted Murder (on her husband) had been dropped and she was now serving a twelve-year sentence for the manslaughter of Jacs. The first episode of season two shows Bea's incapability to cope with Debbie's death while under the influence of sedatives. The Governor cuts her supply off, releases her from solitary and moves her from Cell Block H. Bea struggles with images of Debbie, refusing to believe she has died as she dreams of her. Liz comforts Bea, who decides she is going to get revenge by killing Brayden Holt. Bea is attacked by Boomer under Franky's orders, in an attempt to display dominance over her and solidify her position as the new top dog.

Simone Slater returns to the prison, and eventually forms an alliance with Bea after she saves her from Boomer, who is using her to get at Brayden. Simone informs Bea of an attack the Holts have orchestrated against Bea. Bea initially suspects the new inmates Jess and trans woman Maxine, but it is later discovered that another recent inmate, who had been faking a leg injury, was the attacker. After the inmate comes for Bea in the showers, Maxine saves her and the two become friends.

Over the next few episodes, we begin to see Bea's plan come to fruition, from learning that cutting wrists means that hand cuffs cannot be used, to hoarding blood thickeners, and bulking up. Bea also provokes Boomer into starting a fight intentionally so that Franky gets suspicious of Bea.

In Into The Night, Franky uses the knife against Bea during a fight outbreak in the laundry. Bea wins the fight, turning down the opportunity to kill Franky using a box cutter, and instead slices her own arms and ends up in the hospital.

Bea then escapes from hospital, gets a gun from Liz, and shoots Brayden Holt. As the second season comes to an end, Franky and Bea come face-to-face on Bea's return to H Block, after being arrested for the murder of Brayden Holt, to which Franky tells the onlooking crowd that Bea is the new top dog.

In Season 3 Bea is sentenced to life without parole for the murder of Brayden Holt. When she returns from her trial we find out that the Governor Joan Ferguson is taking away all the privileges, even smoking. Bea gets slotted for ordering a smoke strike. While in the slot she writes a red X which means fire and now on the other side of the tray. Maxine gets the tray and puts Bea's plan into action. The women grab mattresses and liquid that react with fire. Maxine starts the fire. A group of masked inmates take Vera hostage and manage to break Bea out of solitary. Bea heads to the exercise yard where she says to Joan, "you don't run this prison. I do."

In the episode Failing Upwards, Bea makes agreements with Ferguson about the consequences of the riot, drugs and privileges. Bea also gets the women pizza for breakfast. Bea finds out that Harry was murdered. Bea also burns Boomer's hands on the steam-press.

In the episode Righteous Acts, Jodie is told by Joan to shiv Bea otherwise she will keep torturing her. Jodie stabs Bea during a game of Basketball in the exercise yard.

In the episode Evidence, Joan sends Bea to the psychiatric ward after Joan hires a goon to attack her in Wentworth. Bea is apparently in the exercise yard saying that a man who was neither an inmate or a screw attacked her near the boiler room.

In the episode Blood and Fire, Joan Ferguson lights Wentworth on fire and gets trapped with Doreen's baby Joshua, Franky and Bea turn around and go looking for Jess and Joshua, they find them in a rubbish Area, the ceiling starts collapsing with Bea, Joshua, Franky and Ferguson trapped inside. Bea climbs through the vent while holding Joshua and exits the building. Bea gives Doreen Anderson her baby and then runs back inside to save Franky and Will Jackson runs in after her. Will and Bea manage to push the door open and Bea grabs Franky and tells Will to leave Joan there but Will grabs her and brings her out. The place burns down with Jess inside but everybody else gets out.

During season 4 we see Bea's struggle as she faces a life in prison without a purpose. On one hand, we see her emotional turmoil as she begins to self-harm, while also having to deal with 'The Freak' and Kaz Proctor as inmates. On the other hand, we see Bea let her guard down and slowly let herself fall in love with Allie Novak, a member of Kaz's crew. Joan notices this and uses it against her, unsuccessfully trying to drown Bea and then by giving Allie a near fatal hotshot.

Bea confronts Joan Ferguson, moments after her release from prison, with a screwdriver in an attempt to kill her to avenge Allie Novak's attempted murder, and to ensure Ferguson would not be released and therefore could not cause any havoc from the outside. After she is disarmed by Ferguson, Bea thrusts herself onto her own screwdriver, forcing Joan into stabbing her 8-13 times, providing the evidence needed to keep Joan incarcerated. The situation is witnessed by both Vera Bennett and Will Jackson. Bea is last seen lying in a large pool of her own blood, making her the "tragic hero".

== Reception ==
Danielle Cormack received an ASTRA Award in 2015 for her portrayal of Bea Smith. Cormack also won a LOGIE in 2015 for playing Bea Smith.

Cormack has also been nominated for LOGIE awards and an ASTRA award in 2014.

Danielle Cormack was nominated in both 2015 and 2016 for AACTAs awards for her portrayal of Bea Smith.

Writing about the kiss between Bea and Allie, Elaine Atwell wrote "Oh, it’s everything. I never hoped for this, never expected it, and it is all the sweeter for being a surprise. Not just sweet, it is a balm. A healing salve on my heart, and on the scars we have all sustained lately. And even though Joan is listening to the whole thing go down, and plotting a way she can use it against them, it does nothing to detract from one of the most beautiful relationships I have ever had the privilege to write about."

The romance between Bea and Allie was mentioned in a reason for "Why 'Orange Is The New Black' should be replaced with Wentworth", the writer stated "Although this reason may be a bit biased*, others who are not part of the LGBT community have come to like this relationship as well. This reasons is here due to the recent development in Wentworth season 4. Many of the fans were happy that one of the main characters was able to find love in a seemingly hopeless place."
