= Will Jackson (Wentworth) =

- Wentworth character
- First appearance: "No Place Like Home"
- Last appearance: "Legacy"
- Created by: Lara Radulovich
- Portrayed by: Robbie Magasiva
- Status: Alive
- Duration: 2013–2021

In-universe information
- Full name: William Richard Jackson
- Occupation: Governor of Wentworth Prison (2021-present), Deputy Governor of Wentworth Prison (2016-2021), Senior Officer at Wentworth Prison (2013-2016)
- Affiliation: Wentworth Prison; Bea Smith (formerly); Vera Bennett; Matthew Fletcher (formerly); Jake Stewart; Franky Doyle (formerly); Kaz Proctor (formerly) Marie Winter (formerly) Rita Connors
- Significant others: Meg Jackson (wife; deceased); Rose Atkins; Marie Winter (lover)

William Jackson is a fictional character in Wentworth Prison. Will is portrayed by Robbie Magasiva. Will is notable for his friendships with Matthew Fletcher and Bea Smith. Will has also been involved in a one-sided rivalry with Joan Ferguson.

== Development ==
Magasiva talked about getting the role. He said "It was an interesting time. It was a learning curve for me. If the whole idea was to get into a room with a casting director and make an impression, I did what I came for. They've seen my work and have me in mind, so I've achieved that. I came back thinking it was the most impossible thing to do, there's no chance of me ever kind of making it there. But I came back and thought if I put in the hard work and keep on doing what I'm doing it is doable."

== Storylines ==
=== Backstory ===
Before his wife's death, Will seemed to be a very easy-going officer. He was quite relaxed around the prisoners. Like his colleague, Vera Bennett, he cared about the women, and got involved in prison life, but unlike Vera, he did not get too concerned with the prisoners' problems.

Will was a social worker before becoming a prison officer, during his time as a social worker, he removed a baby from a prisoner, who was later murdered because of her inappropriate relationship with an officer.

During the Season Premiere, Will is first seen processing Bea (Danielle Cormack) when she is brought into Wentworth Prison. Will then is seen flirting with Meg and is caught by Matthew Fletcher (Aaron Jeffery). Will takes Bea out for a smoke when she is in solitary confinement. The episode ends with Will finding Meg dead and Bea covered in her blood.

Following Meg's death, Will was seen watching the interviews of the prisoners on his laptop. When Doreen and Kaiya make a picture for Will, he rips it up in front of them.

When Will continues to investigate the death of his wife Meg, he discovers how his friend Fletch and Meg had a peculiar relationship. Will later discovers that his wife Meg had an abortion sometime before she died. Fletch had to help him come to his senses after almost he overdosed on cocaine. Soon after, Will is blackmailed by Jacs Holt when he confronts her about catching Brayden and Debbie doing drugs.

Will supports Bea during the death of her daughter Debbie. When Bea is not allowed to see the body, Will visits Debbie and spends some time with her and passes on that Bea loves her.

In the season one finale, Will listens to a recording of Jacs convincing Brayden to kill Debbie. When Will confronts Jacs, she tries to manipulate him to delete the recording in return for information about Meg's murder. When Will and Fletch do a cell toss, Will finds Meg's bracelet in Jacs’ cell but unbeknownst to him, Liz Birdsworth planted it there to protect Franky.

A calmer Will returned for Season Two, as he believed Meg's killer, Jacs Holt, had paid the ultimate price with her own life and moves on with prison nurse, Rose Atkins.

Will gets quizzed by Joan Ferguson about his past as a social worker. Joan then tells him that the addiction programs would cease from that moment on.

In "Twist The Knife", Will learns that Fletch was having an affair with his wife, Meg. Will brutally attacks Fletch in the boiler room during a prison lockdown.

When Maxine Conway tries to escape prison, she is caught by Will.

Will refuses to let Harry Smith see Bea, Harry then accuses Will of having an affair with Bea. Will and Rose later go on a date where a mysterious van runs them off the road. Will goes to Harry's to confront him and smashes his van up. Will is then arrested for criminal damage. Ferguson gets Will off the charges, but it is revealed in a flashback that Ferguson is trying to get revenge against Will.

Leading up to the finale of Season Two, Bea has a battle with Franky where she slashes her wrists to avoid cuffing. Will leaves Bea unattended and Bea then escapes. Will goes searching for Bea and speaks to Liz Birdsworth. Joan leads the police to believe that Bea and Will were working together. Will is later arrested.

In Season Three it is revealed that Will received four months suspension for "aiding" Bea. Will holds a grudge against Bea for a while. Ferguson then has Will framed for murdering Harry Smith. Will continues to date Rose.

In "Failing Upwards", Will visits Fletch and finds it in himself to move on from his negative history with him. Will is also accused of murdering Harry. During the time trying to prove his innocence, Joan Ferguson plants the murder weapon in his garage and then presumably tips off the police.

On the day of Franky's parole, Ferguson sends Will a confession from Franky admitting that she killed Meg. Will then confronts Franky but ends up forgiving her which displeased Ferguson.

Will is arrested again on suspicion of Harry's murder but Bea manages to get him a name that she received from a vigilante. Will then helps Bea and Franky rescue Joshua and Ferguson from a fire in the prison that was started to cover up Jess Warner's death.

In Season Four, Will has been promoted to Deputy Governor and becomes a target for Kaz Proctor and The Red Right Hand as the one-sided rivalry with Ferguson continues.

Ferguson, having found protection in Kaz's crew, cunningly blames Will for her brutal ganging, a move which only strengthens Kaz's support for her. When Bea defends Will, it backfires dramatically.

In the season finale, Will is suspended. Bea forces Ferguson into stabbing her 13 times, providing the evidence needed to keep her incarcerated. The situation is witnessed by both Will and Vera. Will tries to keep her alive but shortly after Bea dies in his arms.

Season Five begins with the aftermath of the death of Bea Smith. Still shocked and saddened Will informs the women Bea is dead. Vera thanks Will at Bea's funeral for organizing it and offers him to return to work despite his recent suspension. Will accepts with Franky keeping his faith in justice. Later Franky is framed for murder, but Will believes she is innocent.

Will is determined to end the drug issue at Wentworth, reinforcing security. Vera supported his decision, helping his actions become successful. But soon former Governor Ferguson makes sure the drugs return to Wentworth with help of now Deputy Governor, Jake Stewart.

Kaz is confident an officer is involved and blames Will, first to Vera and then informs the women why he had been suspended. Kaz is on her way to her sentence appeal with Will and another prison guard, taking fellow officer Linda Miles' place so he could have a chance to confront Kaz. Moments later the van suddenly crashes into a river due to the tire bolts being loosened by Franky, as she thought her trial hearing was that day so she would be in the van and therefore end up in hospital in an attempt to free herself from Wentworth and prove her innocence. Will risks his own life and almost drowns while saving Kaz from the back of the van. The two finally reach safety and go to hospital. On their arrival back at Wentworth, she thanks Will for saving her life and tells him things could possibly be different between the two of them from there on, Ferguson sees it, unknown to them.

Will and Kaz, now friendly, find out Jake is the corrupt officer bringing drugs to the prison. Will asks Kaz to tell Allie Novak to speak to Vera, but Kaz refuses believing Vera would listen to Will. Kaz convinces Allie to talk but is blackmailed by Ferguson through Jake, threatening Franky's sister. Will argues with a naive Vera and is informed of her relationship with Jake. After she does not believe him. Will calls general manager, Derek Channing, to expose Jake. Kaz shares with Will she does not have his same faith in the system.

Channing discovers the truth but supports Jake for his own gain and offers Will a transfer. Will, tired of all the injustice, informs him he will resign. Privately, Will talks to Kaz and confesses his complete loss of faith in the system and tells her he is leaving Wentworth. Kaz tries to convince him to stay, saying the women need him more than ever but he says they can find someone else, until Kaz tearfully asks him to stay by telling him she needs him and also needs to know there is at least one good man.

Vera briefly holds a grudge against Will for her permanent demotion from governorship by Channing, still unaware Will was right. After Ferguson confirms Will's accusations were correct, she apologizes acknowledging he was the only one to see through Jake.

Will, concerned about Vera, asks her if she is okay. Vera informs him her relationship with Jake not only was false but orchestrated by Ferguson herself to get revenge on her. Will reflects on how both, despite all she has done saved her life.

After that conversation and a brief chat with Linda, Will makes a discovery and realizes Jake killed Nils Jespers for Ferguson. Will confronts Jake again, first he denies it then admits it. Will is upset Jake will not tell the police and leaves him crying on the floor.

Later in medical, Ferguson begins to taunt him about the death of his wife, Meg, and how he did nothing to avenge her. Thus, revealing she was the one that sent him the recording of Franky's confession. A very angry Will leaves Ferguson. Then saddened, Will chats with Kaz and takes the blame of all of Ferguson's victims since he saved her from the fire and fears Kaz will be next. Kaz admits maybe both were wrong for trying to save her. Will says Ferguson will not stop until she is dead and Kaz agrees by saying sometimes to get justice you have to cross the line.

Will, still angry with Jake, ignores him when he tries to talk to him, but Jake insists and informs him of Allie's and Franky's escape plan. In the final scene, it is revealed Will has teamed up with Jake and Allie and is burying Ferguson alive to end her reign of terror and avenge Bea.

In Season Six, Will regains his Deputyship whilst his personal life unravels after burying Ferguson alive. Without giving details, Will tells Kaz that Ferguson is not coming back. She sobs when she understands he meant that he has killed her. Will gradually becomes more tormented by his actions and gets hooked on pills to make Ferguson's ghost go away. Kaz assures Will he did what he had to do to protect the women and reminds him he is a good man. This does not ease his guilt. Later, Kaz, after lagging to Will about Vicky Kosta's 'fight club' offers him to keep doing it if it helps protect the women, Will seems skeptical and warns her of the danger of lagging. During a breakdown at the workshop, Will snaps at Jake telling him at least he did not have to bury someone alive, much to Jake's shock. Afterward, he understands why Will is so disturbed and suffering from insomnia and asks where he buried her, but he does not want to talk about it. Kaz caringly holds Will's injured hand after he trashed the workshop when 'he heard Ferguson' but he still does not want to talk. Kaz continues to comfort Will but they are interrupted by her old nemesis, Marie Winter. At night, Will finds Marie doing drugs in her cell but spares her. Kaz is accused of lagging to Will by Sonia Stevens (that she later killed to save Liz) both agree to put on hold their arrangement of lagging to protect the women for her own safety. Will haunted by Ferguson's hallucinations seeks comfort in a seemingly kindred spirit, Marie. They quickly bond over loss and engage in a sexual relationship, and he feels better but it is short-lived once Vera has a stalker that appears to be Ferguson. Will's hallucinations worsen but he is comforted by Marie once again after mistaking an inmate for Ferguson and scaring everyone at the cafeteria. As Vera remains being stalked by what she thinks is Ferguson and she discovers Jake killed Ferguson's former hitman. Will has no choice but confess to Vera that he killed Ferguson with Jake's help, and he must protect him. Vera albeit initially shocked remains supportive of Will but demands to go to the burial place to make sure she really is dead and so does Jake. Will is disgusted by the idea but later agrees. At night the three go together and find a rotting corpse, unaware to them they are being watched and photographed by the mystery person.

During the Season Six finale, questioned by the police regarding Ferguson's murder, and when Vera goes with the detectives to check the footage of the driver bay it is revealed that Will deleted the security footage. He reveals later that he will confront the police and tell them everything, not just for Jake, but for Vera, but that plan is put on hold after Murphy is shot outside Vera's house and Jake tells Will he has an idea to pin it all on Channing.

In the Season Seven premiere, Will is asked to be acting governor after Vera is taken hostage by a junkie inmate. Will has stated that he wants to resign for the third time, after knowing Marie received a 15-year sentence and decided to rekindle her relationship with Allie. Will insists he would not make a good acting governor but is persuaded to stay by Vera as she stepped down from governors' duties due to her pregnancy. Jake questions Will's behavior towards Marie after they had an argument and tells him it looks suspicious. Will lies and tells him nothing happened. Will apologizes to Kaz for siding with Marie and offers her to work together again to protect the women. After Will becomes Acting Governor, the position of deputy Governor becomes available. Both Linda and Jake apply. Will does not really think either are suitable but in the ends picks Linda because he cannot trust Jake. Much to Jake's dislike, Will explains to him that Vera would not want him in that position.

After Kaz tries to blow up Marie their friendship becomes strained again. Will indefinitely confines Kaz to Solitary and refuses to see her. After an argument Kaz weeps and tells Will she does not want him to hate her. Will releases Kaz with the condition that she will do therapy with new prison psychiatrist, Greg Miller. Will visits a recovering Marie in the medical unit. Marie holds his hand, and they kiss, Kaz witnesses it. Kaz becomes hostile towards Will, leaving him slightly confused. Marie begins to manipulate Will, telling him she is not safe with Kaz around, but he reassures her Kaz will not attack her. Kaz finds out and warns him his 'girlfriend' is playing him and running the drug business. Will understands why Kaz is angry with him, and panicking, tells Marie in his office Kaz knows about them and if she tells, both will be ruined. Marie calms down Will and tells him she will handle Kaz. Marie confronts Kaz and tells her not to tell the women of their affair or else she would ruin Will's career, or he would go to prison. Kaz agrees to remain silent if she stops sleeping with Will. Marie tells Will she fixed the problem, but they should not be seen together.

In Episode 5, Will is called to the scene after Vera finds Kaz's body. Will rushes from the governor's office and goes to Vera and asks why he is not working on her, but Vera says that it is too late. Will goes in for a closer look and becomes overcome with grief. Will puts the prison on lockdown as detectives come in and investigate. Will lets the women hold a memorial service and he lifts the lockdown, and he tells Marie how Kaz was killed and that she should go into protection. Will becomes furious later when Kosta is found with drugs and then the hoodie used in the murder, he witnesses alongside Vera, Marie becoming top dog.

In Episode 6, Will gets the results of the inquest back and has to release Kosta from the slot. Will orders another ramp of the prison and Vera tells him that he cannot let her death become personal. Will reveals that he will not stop trying as he owes it to her, and that there are protesters outside the prison blaming him for Kaz's death. Will is later seen suspending Jake after Jake is falsely accused of sexual harassment. He later is seen talking with Marie in the slot and being completely horrified that drugs were found in her cell and that he says he cannot release her.

In Episode 7, Will releases Marie from the slot and has words with Vera on multiple occasions telling Vera that he will not allow Rita to visit Ruby. But Will learns from Marie that she has broken up with Allie and is told by Linda that Allie has requested a move back to H1. Will allows the move back to H1 and orders another ramp. They find nothing during this ramp as Vera tells Will that they failed Kaz and the women. Will tells Vera at least it was not on her watch, but she still feels guilty for it. Will begins to hallucinate Kaz and later sleeps with Marie and is furious when Vera returns to the isolation unit with Rita after Marie manipulated him and convinced him not to let Rita see Ruby. Rita realizes Will might be having an affair with Marie and tips off Vera. Vera goes through the CCTVs and spots Will and Marie on the elevator heading to governor's office. Tensions grow between Will and Vera as she tries to open his eyes about Marie and lets her know she will not let her destroy him. Vera is held hostage by Sean who is orchestrating an escape plan for Marie. Vera manages to push the panic button and Will puts the prison in lockdown. Rita alerts Will whatever is happening with Sean, Marie is involved. Will talks to Marie on the radio and she tells him to open the gate. Will refuses to call off the lockdown and calls the police. Sean begins to threaten Will. He shoots someone, much to Will's relief it is not Vera, but Vicky Kosta. Sean shoots May (Boomer's drunk mother). Will, now with police, back up and the attorney general (Michael Heston) has no choice but to do as Sean says to avoid more casualties. Rita confesses to Will she is an undercover cop that was sent to Wentworth to investigate Marie and whoever is protecting her through blackmail files. Will realizes Marie used him to obtain these files. Together they discover it is the attorney general, a pedophile working with Marie and Sean. Will furiously returns to governor's office and exposes him and his plan to break out Marie. Sean confesses he killed Kaz. Allie kills Sean and shoots Marie in the leg, ending the siege. At night Will confronts Marie asking her if it is true that Sean killed Kaz. She tells him she did not know until he said it and begs him to believe her, but Will does not want to hear from her anymore. He tells Marie when she gets back from the hospital, she will be sent into protection alone and for the rest of her days at Wentworth. A happier Will greets Vera and the child she gave birth to during the siege. He tells her he is very happy for her and apologizes. Vera smiles and gently touches his face letting him know he is forgiven. Rita and Will quickly bond over the death of Liz and her undercover job at Wentworth being complete thanks to him. Rita also makes Will promise to look after Ruby while she is gone. In a shocking finale reveal, Rita sees from far homeless people, one of them being Joan Ferguson, Will's longtime nemesis that he buried alive at the end of Season Five and believes to be dead.

== Reception ==
In both 2014 and 2015, Robbie Magasiva was nominated for Most Outstanding Male Performance in the ASTRA Awards for his role as Will Jackson.
