= Wentworth season 8 =

Wentworth
- Season 8
- Season 8, Part 1 – Region 4 DVD cover
- Starring: Leah Purcell; Kate Jenkinson; Katrina Milosevic; Robbie J Magasiva; Bernard Curry; Rarriwuy Hick; Susie Porter; Kate Box; Jane Hall; Zoe Terakes; Vivienne Awosoga; Kate Atkinson; Pamela Rabe
- No. of episodes: 20

Release
- Original network: Fox Showcase
- Original release: 28 July 2020 – 26 October 2021

Season chronology
- ← Previous; Season 7

The eighth season of Australian television drama series Wentworth, premiered on Fox Showcase on 28 July 2020. The twenty-episode final season has been divided into two parts; the first, titled Wentworth: Redemption, contains the first ten episodes (2020), while the second, titled Wentworth: The Final Sentence, includes the remaining ten episodes and commenced broadcast on 24 August 2021. The story picks up sometime following the siege at the end of the previous season where the prisoners and staff struggle to rebuild their lives as they struggle to cope in the aftermath. In season 8 Joan Ferguson returns, and it is explained how she escaped death after being buried alive by Will Jackson.

This season introduced four new main characters: Ann Reynolds (Jane Hall), Lou Kelly (Kate Box), Judy Bryant (Vivienne Awosoga), Reb Keane (Zoe Terakes), and special guest stars Marta Dusseldorp as Sheila Bausch and Tina Bursill as Eve Wilder.

In Canada and the UK, the 2nd half of season 8 ("The Final Sentence") was split off and distributed as a 9th season.

== Cast ==
=== Main ===
- Leah Purcell as Rita Connors
- Kate Jenkinson as Allie Novak
- Katrina Milosevic as Susan "Boomer" Jenkins
- Robbie J Magasiva as Governor Will Jackson
- Bernard Curry as Jake Stewart
- Rarriwuy Hick as Ruby Mitchell
- Susie Porter as Marie Winter
- Kate Box as Lou Kelly
- Jane Hall as Ann Reynolds
- Zoe Terakes as Reb Keane
- Vivienne Awosoga as Judy Bryant
- Kate Atkinson as Vera Bennett
- Pamela Rabe as Joan Ferguson

=== Special guest ===
- Marta Dusseldorp as Sheila Bausch
- Tina Bursill as Eve Wilder
- Gary Sweet as Dale Langdon

=== Recurring ===
- David de Lautour as Dr. Greg Miller
- Jacquie Brennan as Deputy Governor Linda Miles
- Peter O'Brien as Tony Cockburn
- Emily Havea as Mon Alson
- Louisa Mignone as Zaina Saad
- Alexandra Schepisi as Cynthia Rattray
- Dion Mills as Joe Hoxon
- Marco Chiappi as Liam Skinner
- Tom Wren as Dominic Slade
- Kevin Harrington as Officer Roberts
- Alex Andreas as Detective Kanellis
- Mereoni Vuki as Detective McKenner
- Cecilia Low as Officer Deng
- Nicholas Farnell as Detective Jones
- Patrick Harvey as Detective Morelli
- Cle Morgan as Carla Sturgess
- Lana Williams as Kath Maxwell
- Greg Fryer as Blair Mitchell

== Episodes ==
No. overall	No. in season	Title	Directed by	Written by	Original release date	Aus. viewers
Part 1: Redemption
81	1	"Resurrection"	Kevin Carlin	Pete McTighe	28 July 2020	107,000
Lou Kelly, a former top dog of Wentworth, and her transgender boyfriend Reb Keane arrive at the prison after an armed robbery. Marie is removed from isolation and placed in the protection unit; there she offers to pay for Reb’s sex reassignment surgery if Reb kills Ruby. New General Manager Ann Reynolds takes the helm following the siege with the intention of removing Will from the service. Vera is reluctant to return to work after the birth of her daughter Grace; however, she is tempted when she is offered a position she cannot refuse and on the condition that Will remains as governor. Rita remains in police protection pending her charges and is desperate to make contact with Ruby. Later, she learns that Attorney General Heston, Marie’s former protector, has been found dead. After Boomer insults Reb, Lou viciously attacks Boomer which prompts Top Dog Allie to remove one of Lou's fingers. Joan, now living on government welfare under the pseudonym Kath Maxwell, puts her plan for revenge into action and has set her sights on abducting Grace.
82	2	"Ends and Means"	Kevin Carlin	Max Conroy & Kim Wilson	4 August 2020	78,000
Lou returns from the hospital unit with her finger reattached, while she and Reb hatch a scheme to raise money for his sex reassignment surgery. Ann persuades Vera to let her hair down and she agrees to let Jake babysit Grace while they go to bar. Marie discovers that she may serve a life sentence in light of Heston's death and threatens to expose her affair with Will if she is not moved into general; she then decides to sabotage Ruby's plans for parole by informing the police of Danny's murder. Honouring his promise to Rita, Will covers for Ruby at the last minute and the charges are dropped. Marie, having failed in avenging Danny's murder, attempts suicide but is rescued by Will. Joan's plans to abduct Grace are thwarted by a homeless man who knows she is not Kath Maxwell and attacks her, leaving her for dead.
83	3	"Enemy of the State"	Beck Cole	Marcia Gardner	11 August 2020	73,000
Following her suicide attempt, Marie begins to suffer from nightmares and suspects that she has had a near-death experience, which Greg believes to be the medication she is taking; however, when Marie has a vision of Danny, she suddenly makes peace with herself over the guilt of his death and the failures in her life while making the decision to retract her statement about Ruby. Reb becomes frantic when he begins to withdraw from his HRT medication and makes a request to Will, which is granted, only to be overruled by Ann, forcing Lou to take desperate measures in order to keep up a regular supply. Reb injects himself with a black market medication and goes into anaphylactic shock. Ruby receives a visit from her father, Blair, who informs her that he is dying of cancer and that he wishes to make contact with Rita before it's too late. Judy Bryant, a British hacker suspected of terrorism, arrives at Wentworth and immediately clashes with those in charge, and persuades Allie to take a stance against prison conditions, forcing the women to go on hunger strike; When false evidence is presented, Judy realises that Ann has set her up.
84	4	"Revenant"	Beck Cole	John Ridley	18 August 2020	59,000
Joan remains in a comatose state and it is revealed that ever since the DNA testing of the body in the grave (the real Kath Maxwell), the police have known all along that she had not died, confirming that she escaped with the help of prison officer Brenda Murphy. Ann announces that the protection unit is to be closed permanently and the prisoners are moved to general. Vera grants Judy permission to call her father in London, without Ann's knowledge. Lou decides to kill Ruby for the money to pay for Reb's operation unaware that the offer no longer stands; when Marie steps in to save Ruby, it is thought that she was attempting to kill her, leading Allie to assault Marie. Ann offers Lou a proposition which involves forming a crew and becoming her secret informant in exchange for resuming Reb's gender transition. Jake plans to kill Joan, fearing that she will come for Vera and Grace, however, she suddenly awakens from her coma. Convinced that they will be charged with attempted murder, Vera, Will and Jake go to the hospital and are surprised to find that Joan has apparently entered a fugue state, claiming to be Kath Maxwell.
85	5	"Fallout"	Fiona Banks	Pete McTighe	25 August 2020	65,000
In a desperate attempt to make contact with Rita, Judy agrees to help Ruby by hacking into government information and finding the address of where she is hiding. The women lose all privileges when Boomer plays a prank during a presentation. Lou forces Boomer to confess by threatening to cut off her finger, for which Boomer blames Judy. Lou informs Ann and Judy is placed in the slot where she is pepper sprayed by Linda, prompting Vera to clash with Ann over the mistreatment of a prisoner. Allie's plan to take down Lou is thwarted when she becomes outnumbered by Lou’s crew. Ann reveals the ordeal of her daughter's death due to a terrorist attack in the UK, which fuels her hatred towards Judy. Will tells Allie that Joan will be transferred interstate, however it is later announced that she will be returning to Wentworth under orders from the Minister. Ruby is out on day release and goes to see Rita where she shares of the news of their dying father; following the visit, Rita receives a phone call from her former handlers of when she was undercover and is informed that if she does not retract her statement to the police, her sister will die.
86	6	"Fugitive"	Fiona Banks	Marcia Gardner	1 September 2020	56,000
Reb is almost sexually assaulted by Cynthia when Marie interrupts and fights her off. Marie and Reb begin to bond further, and Reb keeps it a secret from Lou. Will discovers that Ann initially intended to replace him as governor and that Vera knew all along hence her return to work. Wentworth prepares for Joan's return; however all are not convinced that she has lost her memory, yet Jake begins to wonder if she is in fact genuine. Allie tortures Marie for information on Ruby's disappearance, unbeknownst to her that Marie has nothing to do with it. Rita makes a desperate bid to rescue her sister when she tracks down her captors, shooting Morelli dead while Jones manages to get away; Rita persuades Ruby to turn herself in as Rita decides to go on the run. When Allie learns that Ruby has been located, she releases Marie and later breaks down, horrified at her own vicious behaviour.
87	7	"Battle Lines"	Corrie Chen	Max Conroy & Kim Wilson	8 September 2020	62,000
Ruby arrives back at the prison to face an angry Allie. Ann announces that Joan is to be moved into general, forcing Will to consider resigning as governor. Joan is taken under Lou's wing under Ann's instructions if Reb is to continue his HRT treatment. Allie confronts Joan and reminds her of all her past crimes at Wentworth, causing Joan to scream out in anguish. Allie confides in Boomer and admits that she is slowly losing control. Judy is informed that she is to be extradited to the United States; growing frantic, she tries to contact her father but to no avail. When it is discovered that Lou has been slipping notes to Linda, Judy decides to slip a message of her own, fooling Linda into thinking it's from Lou. She is then granted a supervised call to her father, for which he dismisses her. Ann reads the note intended for Linda and goes to the kitchen to meet who she thinks is Lou. She is then attacked and assaulted by Judy.
88	8	"Goldfish, Part 2"	Corrie Chen	John Ridley	15 September 2020	54,000
Wentworth is in lockdown following Ann's attack while Allie's position as Top Dog is put to the test. Reb's request for top surgery is granted and he is required to undergo therapy, something which evokes a painful memory forcing him to lash out at Greg; worried that he has sabotaged his change, Lou promises to "fix" things and forces Joan to poison Greg. Joan begins to have hallucinations of a young girl and decides to withdraw from her therapy sessions fearing that she will remember who she once was. As the prison remains in lockdown, Judy tells Allie that it was Lou who attacked Ann just as Lou incites a riot. Having no other option, Allie is forced to lag to Will so that all privileges are reinstated, putting an end to the riot. Ruby finally gets in touch with Rita. Marie and Reb grow closer.
89	9	"Monster"	Kevin Carlin	John Ridley	22 September 2020	46,000
Reb is horrified when new remand prisoner Sheila Bausch arrives at Wentworth on charges of murder. Her backstory reveals that she was affiliated with the clinic where Lou and Reb resided, bringing up more painful memories for Reb during a therapy session. Judy's stress of being in prison finally gets the better of her as she takes LSD and loses control. Ann returns to work and is informed that it was Lou who attacked her; much to her doubt, she later tells Lou that it was Allie who lagged on her. Joan's committal hearing is imminent and Vera enlists the help of Allie to catch Joan out before she goes to trial. Allie drugs Joan with LSD in the hope of forcing out a confession; Joan takes a bad trip and continues to see a young girl with blood on her hands. When Linda knocks her unconscious she is suspended from duty. As Joan recovers in the hospital unit, the girl appears one last time and utters the words "I love you, Mummy". Lou returns from the slot and confronts Sheila and there it is discovered that Lou has been keeping a secret of her own from Reb. Lou decides to take revenge on Allie for lagging.
90	10	"The Enemy Within"	Kevin Carlin	Marcia Gardner	29 September 2020	65,000
Lou discovers that her phone is missing and that the money they had accumulated for Reb's top surgery has been stolen. Based on misinformation, Lou is led to believe that Allie stole her phone and the money. Lou brutally bashes Allie but Marie saves her life by pressing the panic button. Lou and her associates also accost Joan, killing her pet fish and causing her to experience flashbacks of her troubled childhood and the murder of her mother at the hands of her father and it is revealed that the little girl from the hallucinations was in fact a young Joan. Meanwhile, Boomer meets with her telephone friend and discovers that he knew she was a prisoner all along and that he runs a prison porn website, which Boomer attempts to recruit Ruby to help her with. Despite pressure from Vera, Dr. Miller testifies in court that Joan is indeed suffering from traumatic brain damage. Sheila tries to drive a wedge between Lou and Reb by revealing that Lou was a bystander in the doctor's sexual assaults on patients, Lou confirms this to Reb, apologizes, and admits that she murdered the doctor. Judy confesses to attacking General Manager Ann, angering Allie. Judy later stabs Allie in the shower, seriously wounding her. It is revealed that Judy stole the phone and Reb's surgery money and used it to hire an assassin to assassinate the visiting United States Secretary of State, who was seeking her extradition. With Vera's approval, Linda places Joan in a spit hood. She experiences a psychotic breakdown which leads to her remembering and accepting her true identity.
Part 2: The Final Sentence
91	11	"Rogue"	Fiona Banks	Kim Wilson	24 August 2021	55,000
Three weeks have passed and Joan, now having gained full recollection of her memory, continues to assume the identity of Kath Maxwell as her trial nears, while desperately trying to control her murderous rage and her need for vengeance against Vera, Will and Jake. Joan turns to Dr. Miller for help as she struggles to keep her feelings from emerging and confides in him that her memory has returned. With his career now on the line, Dr. Miller agrees to help her. Allie returns to the compound following her stabbing and immediately reveals that she will never walk again due to spinal damage; Judy is reluctant to face her, fearing that she will be exposed. Allie believes it was Lou who attacked her and advises Judy to keep the truth about the money from Lou. In light of her situation, Allie decides to step down as top dog and appoints Boomer with the position until a formal vote has been made. Rita pays a visit to her dying father, Blair, whom she has not seen for ten years and is saddened to find that he speaks only of Ruby, while he is unaware of her presence. Sheila is charged with murder when Lou and Reb are questioned by the police and put forward their version of events regarding the deaths of nine people. Marie tells Sheila that Lou was responsible for the deaths and assists her in taking revenge against Lou. However, Marie, hoping that Sheila will kill Lou, is shocked to discover that Sheila has actually killed Reb. She returns to her unit to find a heartbroken Lou cradling Reb's body in her arms.
92	12	"Requiem"	Fiona Banks	Marcia Gardner	31 August 2021	53,000
Lou is armed with a shiv and threatens to harm herself and the officers before being dragged away and subdued; she is later informed that she is under suspicion for Reb's murder. Allie is struggling to adjust to life with her disability, while Judy continues to fret that she will discover the truth of who attacked her. Joan tells Dr. Miller that the medication has taken effect when she begins to express feelings of empathy. Judy receives some encouraging news regarding her extradition. Rita remains by Blair’s bedside and they eventually make peace; Rita promises to protect Ruby and just as Blair passes away, she is arrested. Boomer sets up a conjugal visit between her and Gavin so that he can smuggle in a camera. However, Boomer sees it as the perfect opportunity to blackmail him into getting her pregnant by whatever means possible. Joan lags to Vera that it was Sheila who killed Reb, which she dismisses and accuses Joan. Will confirms to Lou that she and Reb were drugged with a sedative, clearing her of any suspicion. Lou suspects both Allie and Ruby of the murder, but eventually extracts the truth from Zaina by assaulting her. She retrieves a bottle of poison from Marie's cell and a torn bed sheet, jumping to conclusions. Marie has no option but to reveal the killer after being physically threatened by Lou. Lou confronts Sheila and forces her to consume the poison and watches on as she suffers in agony. Marie takes mercy on Sheila and puts her out of her misery, forcing Lou to help. Lou announces to all in the dining room that she killed Sheila and declares herself Top Dog.
93	13	"The Ties That Bind"	Roger Hodgman	John Ridley	7 September 2021	72,000
The staff of Wentworth endure a backlash over recent events when Ann returns to work following a month's absence and announces her plans of bringing the prison into line under stricter security measures. A formal vote is cast and Boomer is appointed Top Dog, until Lou is released from the slot and challenges her to a fight in order to make it official. Rita is back at Wentworth and is determined to make the best of what could be a long stretch inside. However, things are set to become difficult when Lou sets Rita up over a drug test. Joan reveals that she is full of regret over her cruel treatment towards Vera in the past; she becomes consumed with rage, having overheard Jake threatening Vera with custody proceedings over Grace. Judy asks Allie to pretend to be her girlfriend when she applies for a stay of proceedings on compassionate grounds. Linda pushes Ann to consider her for the position of governor and informs her of the sexual relationship which occurred between Will and Marie, and with Marie recently having requested for a transfer, Ann, determined to see Will removed from correctional services, agrees to grant her request if she confirms the allegation, which Marie denies to save Will's career. Boomer picks up the courage to face Lou in the fight, but is ultimately defeated when Lou stabs her with a shiv. Marie comforts a depressed Lou who now realises that she has nothing left to lose; she will take revenge against the officers of Wentworth, whom she truly holds responsible for Reb's death.
94	14	"Judas Kiss"	Roger Hodgman	John Ridley	14 September 2021	46,000
Eve Wilder, a former nanny, arrives at Wentworth on remand for a hit-and-run incident and immediately recognises Joan from her days as a prisoner at Blackmoore, where Joan was once an officer. Eve takes delight in informing Marie of Joan's ruthless treatment of the prisoners in her charge. Eve decides to retaliate against Joan who abruptly stops her in her tracks. Ann is attacked in the yard when a bag filled with urine is thrown at her and she deliberately blames Judy. Ann authorizes that Judy spend the night outside handcuffed to the punishment station when Judy implies it was she who assaulted her in the kitchen. The following morning, Will finds Judy who is rushed to medical with hypothermia. Will attempts to notify the board, but Vera convinces him to hold off as he discovers that it's the second anniversary of Ann's daughter's death. Instead, he forces Ann to issue Judy with an apology. Boomer recovers following the fight and receives a visit from Gavin who demands that she supply him with more explicit footage. The boredom of day-to-day life begins to get to Allie, and whilst attending a dentist session she comes up with a plan involving a tank of nitrous oxide. Vera admits to Jake that she needs help in taking care of Grace as Jake becomes smitten with Eve and asks her for parenting advice. Rita attempts to prove her innocence and that she was an undercover cop, but all fails when a witness who could help her case is found dead. Vera discovers that Greg has been prescribing Joan with Psuldrycin, the same drug Liz Birdsworth had been taking. Lou receives an unwanted letter from Reb's mum, while Allie suddenly knocks Lou unconscious and hooks her up to the nitrous oxide hoping to bring about permanent brain damage, until Lou realises it was Judy who in fact stabbed Allie. Judy announces that her stay of proceedings has been approved, while Allie has now learned the truth.
95	15	"The Unknown Terrorist"	Mat King	Kim Wilson	21 September 2021	68,000
Ann is furious when Boomer's footage is leaked online and orders both cell and strip searches to retrieve the camera and the missing canister of nitrous oxide. Following the unsuccessful search, Will calls out Ann's misconduct. When the heat is off, Boomer enlists the help of Ruby in directing a sex scene featuring Zaina; sparks begin to fly between Zaina and Ruby. Still grieving over Reb, Lou makes an unwelcome pass at Marie. Now that the truth is finally out, Allie manages to hear it from Judy when she gets her high on nitrous oxide. After trying to convince Allie that it was a joke, Judy decides to finish what she started and attempts to kill Allie in the showers before being interrupted by Rita, Ruby and Boomer who all agree to let the women take their own form of punishment in order to spare them extra sentences. However, Boomer loses her patience and bashes Judy. While recovering in hospital, Ann takes pleasure in informing Judy that Allie has withdrawn her State of Dependency and that the extradition proceedings will continue. Joan convinces Eve that Jake has taken an interest in her and persuades her to use it to her advantage by having contraband smuggled into the prison. Vera and Jake clash over Grace when she realises he has been taking advice from Eve. Having discovered that Eve was a former prisoner of Blackmoore, Vera looks into the possibility that Joan remembers Eve and has regained her memory. She searches Dr. Miller's files and proves this to be true. Jake offers to drive a drunken Ann home which leads to a sexual encounter. Lou takes revenge on Judy for her deceit over the stabbing and the stolen money by trying to drown her in a waste disposal bin filled with water but agrees to spare her at the last minute when she makes Lou a deal that she can't refuse in exchange for her protection: Unbeknownst to the other women, the pair plans to escape and the only way to do so is to bomb their way out.
96	16	"One Eye Open"	Mat King	John Ridley	28 September 2021	51,000
Lou and Judy put their elaborate plan to escape into action. Judy, having had her privileges suspended, relies on Lou to pass on her information to a visitor named Fraser in accumulating the proper equipment in making a bomb. However, Lou has a much greater plan in mind and persuades Marie to steal Zaina’s burner phone so that Judy can’t make a call to Fraser and discover what Lou had done. Now that Lou is protecting Judy, Marie requests a transfer and asks Allie would she mind if she moves into H1, which causes friction among the unit. Vera informs Will that Joan’s memory has returned and that Dr. Miller has been prescribing her Psuldrycin, but will have much difficulty in trying to oust Miller, as she has illegally obtained this information. Ann is becoming more desperate in trying to find the camera and offers to reward a bonus wage to the first officer who retrieves it and authorises a less extreme search than before, to avoid another backlash. Linda takes matters into her own hands and unsuccessfully attempts to take out an unofficial strip search on Boomer. Rita’s case begins to look encouraging when her lawyer attempts to trace a string of phone calls made by Jones that could prove her innocence, until Marie receives a visit from Jones, where she is informed that Rita is a cop, in the hope of silencing her. Joan prompts Eve to make her move on Jake. When Jake rejects Eve’s advances, Joan tells Eve that Jake has a history of mistreating women, namely Vera, in the hope that she will kill Jake. However, Joan’s plan backfires when she believes that Eve has placed Jake’s body in a freezer, only to discover that Eve has set a trap by attacking her and attempting to lock her inside the freezer, for which Joan swiftly retaliates. Eve is later found with her left eye missing and holding a spoon. It is then realised that Eve has emotionally unravelled, yet Vera suspects that Joan is the culprit behind it. With no evidence, Eve is transferred to a mental institution. Jake is located alive. The missing eye eventually turns up in Lou’s food, courtesy of Joan. As Lou is about to tell Marie the reason why she is protecting Judy and agreeing to let her move into Reb’s old cell, Marie almost tells Lou the truth about Rita but suddenly the pair begin to kiss one another.
97	17	"Collateral"	Beck Cole	John Ridley	5 October 2021	57,000
Allie is on the verge of a breaking point after finding Ruby in bed with Zaina and feels that she is worth nothing now that she lost all sensation from the waist down. Rita is curious to understand why Marie hasn’t yet informed the women that she is a cop, and Marie reveals to Rita that Lou holds the officers responsible for Reb’s death and that she has held off because she needs Rita's help in uncovering what Lou and Judy have planned. Rita lags to Will that he and the other staff are in danger causing an angry Linda to confront Lou and physically threaten her. Dr. Miller realises just how deep he is in with Joan after what she did to Eve and is certain that she will not be able to contain her murderous urges as Joan begs him not to make a report. Boomer gives Gavin a blow-by-blow account of what to expect in her “Muff Movie”, and the pair sleep together; Gavin is caught by Linda trying to smuggle the camera out. Ann checks its contents and discovers an accidental recording of Lou and Judy discussing the bomb escape. She notifies a National Security Officer who insists on waiting until they are caught red-handed with the equipment. Vera and Will enlist Allie’s help in having Miller removed from the service. Having been rejected by Ruby in the showers, Allie loses control and repeatedly stabs her legs with a shiv which Miller puts down to PTSD. While Miller is comforting Allie, she kisses him. He is informed by Vera and Will that they know the truth about Joan, and they give him the opportunity to resign peacefully or they’ll report him for taking advantage of a prisoner. Lou believes that Joan is lagging to the officers and puts her hand in the steam press, but later slaps a deceitful Marie when she finds Zaina’s phone on voice recorder planted in her cell. The women of H1 reluctantly welcome Marie to their unit. As Joan’s court case draws closer, and with Miller’s career now in jeopardy, she decides it’s time to bring out her ultimate weapon against Vera, Will and Jake: the photo of them at the shallow grave.
98	18	"The Abyss"	Beck Cole	Kim Wilson	12 October 2021	67,000
In receipt of the photo, Vera confronts Joan, warning her she is prepared to confess all to her role in the burial, as the crimes she’d be facing are far less severe than the ones facing Joan. Joan reminds Vera that it is Grace who would suffer, should Vera be jailed. Backed into a corner, Will summons Joan to his office and concedes, agreeing not to stand in the way of she and Dr Miller, in exchange for her silence. Joan agrees. Later, the police visit, having discovered the fake passports that Joan had obtained for her and Grace. Realizing she was planning to kidnap her daughter, Vera plans to poison Joan. When Jake inadvertently intercepts the poison and nearly swallows it, Vera retracts, upset that she almost had stooped to Joan’s level. Joan secretly makes her own attempt to kill Vera, in the library. Her attempt is thwarted when Ann enters and rebukes Vera for failing to help her with a personal matter the previous evening. Rita watches a news report relating to the assassinated United States Secretary of State and deduces that Judy was responsible. Believing Marie lagged on her and Judy’s escape plan, Lou plans to punish Marie with the steam presser. Marie fights off Lou’s henchwomen with a blade and is slotted by Linda. Boomer takes a pregnancy test and is ecstatic when it comes back positive. Rita is visited by the police and charged with Detective Morelli’s murder. Ruby too is charged as an accessory. Her solicitor warns Rita that while the evidence does support her version of events, it equally supports Jones’ and a jury is more likely to accept his version. Rita is devastated. Upon learning of this, Judy invites Rita in on the escape attempt, in exchange for her silence. Rita considers, much to Ruby’s disgust. Lou obtains the phone Marie had used to record all their conversations and listens to her illicit conversation with Detective Jones, thus learning Rita is an undercover cop. Marie tries to warn Rita, but by the time she is released from the slot, it is too late. Lou outs Rita to the entire prison in the exercise yard. Marie and Ruby try in vain to intervene. Rita is brutally beaten by Lou’s henchwomen.
99	19	"The Reckoning"	Kevin Carlin	John Ridley	19 October 2021	64,000
Rita escapes her beating with only a few minor cuts and bruises. Will offers to move her into protection, but she declines, knowing her only chance of proving her and Ruby’s innocence is to return to the unit and find the phone, with Marie’s recording of her conversation with Jonesy. Will agrees but warns Rita the prison has already tried and failed. Boomer, Marie, Allie and Ruby all reject Rita upon her return to the unit, in favour of Lou’s protection. Unbeknownst to Lou however, they are all secretly doing this to help Rita find the phone. Alone, Rita asks Marie to protect Ruby, with Boomer pregnant and Allie a wheelchair user, Marie is her only hope. Marie agrees. Judy receives a visit from her father, with the news that evidence has come forward proving her innocence. Judy therefore calls her escape attempt off with Lou. Lou however remains secretly committed to the escape. When Ann discovers this, she subjects Judy to a brutal beating. Vera and Will intervene and demand that Ann resign. At Joan Ferguson’s trial for Kath Maxwell’s murder, Dr Miller testifies under oath her amnesia is genuine. Outside the court, Vera warns Ferguson she remains prepared to reveal the truth. Under cross examination, Ferguson reveals her memory has returned and wishes to change her plea to guilty. Upon her return to Wentworth, Vera confronts her, demanding why she would do this, when the trial was clearly in her favour. In response, Ferguson only smiles. Ruby is tipped-off that Lou is about to use the mobile phone. Ruby follows but it is a trap and Ruby is set upon by Lou’s henchwomen. She is saved by Marie who fights them all off, but in doing so she is tragically stabbed to death by Lou. Will laments over her body. As Ann leaves the prison, she is informed of the imminent bomb attack on the prison, but warned to keep silent in order to catch the terrorists in the act. Ann is reluctant but agrees when informed these same terrorists are responsible for her daughter’s death. Rita, Ruby, Allie and Boomer all mourn Marie’s death, as the rest of the prison hurl them with threats of death and violence.
100	20	"Legacy"	Kevin Carlin	John Ridley	26 October 2021	73,000
Judy realizes Lou is still intending to bomb her way out of prison. She tries – and fails – to stop her. They are overheard by Ferguson who informs Rita. Rita confronts Lou, which quickly escalates into a brutal fight. During the struggle, the mobile phone – with the recordings on – falls from Lou’s pocket. They are both slotted. In the slot, Rita tries to talk Lou out of the bomb, but Lou resists. Ann stages a bogus transfer to the court house for Judy, knowing that Judy will not stand a chance of survival if she is near to where the bomb is detonated. Unable to talk Lou out of the plan, Judy reluctantly tells Ann of the attack. Ann gloats that she already knows. Judy is unable to tell anyone else. The bomb explodes in the carpark, killing the NSO officers and destroying most of the prison. Rita, Lou, Ruby and Boomer all manage to escape. Allie however remains trapped amongst the rubble. She tries to retrieve the mobile phone. Vera regains consciousness and finds Judy’s impaled remains amongst the rubble. Vera realizes Ann had known about the attack and deliberately orchestrated Judy’s death. Ann strangles Vera. Just as Vera passes out, she is saved by Ferguson, who pulls Ann off her and snaps her neck, killing her instantly. Ferguson carries Vera out of the prison to safety. Outside, she tells Vera she rescued her, so Grace would not be deprived of a mother. Vera is grateful. Ferguson then turns and walks away, disappearing into the night. When Ferguson is declared unaccounted for by Linda, Jake and Will are relieved, believing her to be dead but Vera says nothing. Lou tries to escape the perimeter fences but is apprehended by Rita. She is arrested and charged for her crimes. Allie is carried out to safety. As Rita, Ruby and Boomer greet her, Allie reveals she had managed to retrieve the phone for Rita and Ruby, thus proving their innocence. Standing by one another, they all rejoice. The series ends with Allie uttering Bea’s last words; “It’s going to be okay.”

== Production ==
Season 8, Part 2 – Region 4 DVD cover

Season eight of Wentworth went into production in October 2019. It consists of twenty episodes, titled "Redemption", and featured the first ten episodes in 2020, while the final episodes were broadcast in 2021.

Brian Walsh, Foxtel Executive Director of Television commented that "Wentworth has been the shining star of Foxtel’s extensive slate of Australian dramas and we are very proud to call “action” on the new season. We are indebted to the remarkable creative talent involved and to showcase the outstanding line-up of actors who bring to life this compelling series."

Kate Box joined the cast as Lou Kelly, a former top dog of Wentworth Correctional Facility who often uses a violent approach to get what she wants, along with Jane Hall as Ann Reynolds, a general manager of extreme authority, taking control of the prison following the siege, and Zoe Terakes as transgender character Reb Keane, a meek and shy prisoner and love interest for Lou. It was later announced that actress Vivienne Awosoga would be joining the cast as Judy Bryant. The characters originally appeared in Prisoner in which Lou Kelly was played by Louise Siversen, Ann Reynolds by Gerda Nicolson, Reb Keane by Janet Andrewartha and Judy Bryant by Betty Bobbitt. In June 2020, it was announced that Marta Dusseldorp would join the cast as Sheila Bausch, a cult member accused of mass murder, theft and arson. It was announced in late 2020 that Tina Bursill had been cast as Eve Wilder and is set to appear in the final part of the eighth season in 2021. Bursill portrayed the original Sonia Stevens character in Prisoner, while the character she will be portraying in Wentworth was originally played by Lynda Stoner in Prisoner.

== Reception ==
=== Ratings ===
No.	Title	Air date	Overnight ratings		Ref(s)
No.	Title	Air date	Viewers	Rank	Ref(s)
1	"Resurrection"	28 July 2020	107,000	1	
2	"Ends and Means"	4 August 2020	78,000	3	
3	"Enemy of the State"	11 August 2020	73,000	5	
4	"Revenant"	18 August 2020	59,000	6	
5	"Fallout"	25 August 2020	65,000	5	
6	"Fugitive"	1 September 2020	56,000	6	
7	"Battle Lines"	8 September 2020	62,000	7	
8	"Goldfish, Part 2"	15 September 2020	54,000	5	
9	"Monster"	22 September 2020	46,000	5	
10	"The Enemy Within"	29 September 2020	65,000	4	
11	"Rogue"	24 August 2021	55,000	5	
12	"Requiem"	31 August 2021	53,000	5	
13	"The Ties That Bind"	7 September 2021	72,000	3	
14	"Judas Kiss"	14 September 2021	46,000	6	
15	"The Unknown Terrorist"	21 September 2021	68,000	4	
16	"One Eye Open"	28 September 2021	51,000	6	
17	"Collateral"	5 October 2021	57,000	5	
18	"The Abyss"	12 October 2021	67,000	1	
19	"The Reckoning"	19 October 2021	64,000	3	
20	"Legacy"	26 October 2021	73,000	4	

=== Accolades ===
Equity Ensemble Awards

- Nominated: Most Outstanding Performance by an Ensemble in a Drama Series – Wentworth (Season 8, Part 1)

TV Tonight Awards

- Won: TV Tonight Award for Best Australian Drama Series – Wentworth (Season 8, Part 1)

== International broadcast ==
The season premiered in Australia on Fox Showcase on 28 July 2020. and on August 5 on 5STAR in the UK. In New Zealand, the season is distributed on TVNZ's TVNZ 2 and TVNZ OnDemand streaming service.

In June 2021, it was announced that Season 8, Part 2 was intended to premiere in Germany on 21 July 2021 on Sky Atlantic where it would air double episodes each week; the announcement was made ahead of Foxtel's confirmed release date of 24 August, therefore prompting Sky Atlantic in Germany to reschedule their premiere date and begin broadcast sometime after it has aired in Australia.

The second part of the season premiered on the same day as Australia, 24 August 2021, on 5STAR in the UK.

== Home media ==
Title	Release	Region	Availability		Ref(s)
Title	Release	Region	DVD	Blu-ray	Ref(s)
Wentworth: Season 8, Part 1: Redemption	25 November 2020	Australia − 4/B	Yes	Yes	
Wentworth: Season 8, Part 2: The Final Sentence	2 February 2022	Australia − 4/B	Yes	Yes	
Wentworth Prison: Season Eight, Part One	23 November 2020	UK − 2/B	Yes	Yes	
Wentworth Prison: Season Eight, Part Two	22 November 2021	UK − 2/B	Yes	Yes	
Additional
Part 1: Distributor: Roadshow Entertainment (Australia); Network (United Kingdom); Set details: 10 episodes; 1.78:1 aspect ratio; Audio: Dolby Digital 5.1 (DVD); DTS-HD Master Audio 5.1 (Blu-ray); Subtitles: TBA; Discs: 3-DVD set (region 2 UK & region 4 Australia); 2-Blu-ray set (region B UK & region B Australia); Rating: ACB: MA15+; BBFC: 18
