= List of Wentworth episodes =

Wentworth is an Australian television drama series. It was first broadcast on SoHo on 1 May 2013. The series serves as a contemporary reimagining of Prisoner, which ran on Network Ten from 1979 to 1986. Lara Radulovich and David Hannam developed Wentworth from Reg Watson's original concept. The series is set in the modern day and begins with Bea Smith's (Danielle Cormack) early days in prison.

During the course of the series, 100 episodes of Wentworth aired over eight seasons, between 1 May 2013 and 26 October 2021.

== Series overview ==
Season	Episodes		Originally released		
Season	Episodes		First released	Last released	Network
1	10		1 May 2013	3 July 2013	SoHo
2	12		20 May 2014	5 August 2014	SoHo
3	12		7 April 2015	23 June 2015	SoHo
4	12		10 May 2016	26 July 2016	SoHo
5	12		4 April 2017	20 June 2017	Fox Showcase
6	12		19 June 2018	4 September 2018	Fox Showcase
7	10		28 May 2019	30 July 2019	Fox Showcase
8	20	10	28 July 2020	29 September 2020	Fox Showcase
8	20	10	24 August 2021	26 October 2021	Fox Showcase

== Episodes ==
=== Season 1 (2013) ===
No. overall	No. in season	Title	Directed by	Written by	Original release date	Aus. viewers
1	1	"No Place Like Home"	Kevin Carlin	Pete McTighe	1 May 2013	244,000
2	2	"Fly Me Away"	Kevin Carlin	Pete McTighe	8 May 2013	102,000
3	3	"The Girl Who Waited"	Catherine Millar	Pete McTighe	15 May 2013	110,000
4	4	"The Things We Do"	Catherine Millar	Pete McTighe	22 May 2013	97,000
5	5	"The Velvet Curtain"	Tori Garrett	Pete McTighe	29 May 2013	115,000
6	6	"Captive"	Tori Garrett	Pete McTighe	5 June 2013	92,000
7	7	"Something Dies"	Jet Wilkinson	Pete McTighe	12 June 2013	97,000
8	8	"Mind Games"	Jet Wilkinson	Lally Katz & Emma J. Steele	19 June 2013	82,000
9	9	"To the Moon"	Kevin Carlin	Guila Sandler	26 June 2013	77,000
10	10	"Checkmate"	Kevin Carlin	Emma J. Steele	3 July 2013	125,000

=== Season 2 (2014) ===
No. overall	No. in season	Title	Directed by	Written by	Original release date	Aus. viewers
11	1	"Born Again"	Kevin Carlin	Pete McTighe	20 May 2014	75,000
12	2	"Whatever It Takes"	Kevin Carlin	John Ridley	27 May 2014	99,000
13	3	"Boys in the Yard"	Catherine Millar	Timothy Hobart	3 June 2014	95,000
14	4	"The Danger Within"	Catherine Millar	Marcia Gardner	10 June 2014	66,000
15	5	"Twist the Knife"	Dee McLachlan	Pete McTighe	17 June 2014	64,000
16	6	"The Pink Dragon"	Dee McLachlan	Marcia Gardner	24 June 2014	100,000
17	7	"Metamorphosis"	Pino Amenta	John Ridley	1 July 2014	68,000
18	8	"Sins of the Mother"	Pino Amenta	Timothy Hobart	8 July 2014	79,000
19	9	"The Fixer"	Steve Jodrell	John Ridley	15 July 2014	87,000
20	10	"Jail Birds"	Steve Jodrell	Timothy Hobart	22 July 2014	81,000
21	11	"Into the Night"	Kevin Carlin	Adam Todd	29 July 2014	86,000
22	12	"Fear Her"	Kevin Carlin	Pete McTighe	5 August 2014	103,000

=== Season 3 (2015) ===
No. overall	No. in season	Title	Directed by	Written by	Original release date	Aus. viewers
23	1	"The Governor's Pleasure"	Kevin Carlin	Stuart Page	7 April 2015	100,000
24	2	"Failing Upwards"	Kevin Carlin	Adam Todd	14 April 2015	94,000
25	3	"Knives Out"	Catherine Millar	Pete McTighe	21 April 2015	98,000
26	4	"Righteous Acts"	Catherine Millar	John Ridley	28 April 2015	102,000
27	5	"Mercy"	Steve Jodrell	Adam Todd	5 May 2015	97,000
28	6	"Evidence"	Steve Jodrell	Stuart Page	12 May 2015	118,000
29	7	"The Long Game"	Kevin Carlin	Pete McTighe & Marcia Gardner	19 May 2015	104,000
30	8	"Goldfish"	Kevin Carlin	John Ridley	26 May 2015	108,000
31	9	"Freak Show" (Note: Season 3, episode 9 is alternatively titled "Night of the Long Pencils" in the UK.)	Catherine Millar	Adam Todd	2 June 2015	108,000
32	10	"A Higher Court"	Catherine Millar	Stuart Page	9 June 2015	127,000
33	11	"The Living and the Dead"	Steve Jodrell	John Ridley	16 June 2015	109,000
34	12	"Blood and Fire"	Steve Jodrell	Pete McTighe	23 June 2015	113,000

=== Season 4 (2016) ===
No. overall	No. in season	Title	Directed by	Written by	Original release date	Aus. viewers
35	1	"First Blood"	Kevin Carlin	John Ridley	10 May 2016	140,000
36	2	"Poking Spiders"	Kevin Carlin	Marcia Gardner	17 May 2016	97,000
37	3	"Prisoner"	Steve Jodrell	Pete McTighe	24 May 2016	81,000
38	4	"Screw Lover"	Steve Jodrell	Michael Lucas	31 May 2016	97,000
39	5	"Love and Hate"	Jet Wilkinson	John Ridley	7 June 2016	103,000
40	6	"Divide and Conquer"	Jet Wilkinson	Marcia Gardner	14 June 2016	119,000
41	7	"Panic Button"	Adrian Russell Wills	Pete McTighe	21 June 2016	121,000
42	8	"Plan Bea"	Adrian Russell Wills	Michael Lucas	28 June 2016	84,000
43	9	"Afterlife"	Steve Jodrell	Michael Lucas	5 July 2016	110,000
44	10	"Smitten"	Steve Jodrell	Samantha Winston	12 July 2016	110,000
45	11	"Eleventh Hour"	Kevin Carlin	John Ridley	19 July 2016	123,000
46	12	"Seeing Red"	Kevin Carlin	Pete McTighe	26 July 2016	95,000

=== Season 5 (2017) ===
No. overall	No. in season	Title	Directed by	Written by	Original release date	Aus. viewers
47	1	"Scars"	Mat King	John Ridley	4 April 2017	101,000
48	2	"The Bitch is Back"	Mat King	Andrew Anastasios	11 April 2017	96,000
49	3	"Nothing But the Truth"	Geoff Bennett	Pete McTighe	18 April 2017	88,000
50	4	"Loose Ends"	Geoff Bennett	Marcia Gardner	25 April 2017	85,000
51	5	"Belly of the Beast"	Fiona Banks	Marcia Gardner	2 May 2017	79,000
52	6	"Happy Birthday, Vera"	Fiona Banks	John Ridley	9 May 2017	80,000
53	7	"The Pact"	Mat King	Andrew Anastasios	16 May 2017	83,000
54	8	"Think Inside the Box"	Mat King	Pete McTighe	23 May 2017	73,000
55	9	"Snakehead"	Catherine Millar	Andrew Anastasios	30 May 2017	74,000
56	10	"Mere Anarchy"	Catherine Miller	Marcia Gardner	6 June 2017	81,000
57	11	"Coup de Grâce"	Kevin Carlin	John Ridley	13 June 2017	81,000
58	12	"Hell Bent"	Kevin Carlin	Pete McTighe	20 June 2017	119,000

=== Season 6 (2018) ===
No. overall	No. in season	Title	Directed by	Written by	Original release date	Aus. viewers
59	1	"Clean Slate"	Kevin Carlin	Pete McTighe	19 June 2018	101,000
60	2	"The Boxer"	Kevin Carlin	Marcia Gardner	26 June 2018	87,000
61	3	"Bleed Out"	Fiona Banks	John Ridley	3 July 2018	105,000
62	4	"Winter Is Here"	Fiona Banks	Andrew Anastasios	10 July 2018	83,000
63	5	"Bitter Pill"	Roger Hodgman	John Ridley	17 July 2018	71,000
64	6	"Angel of Wentworth"	Roger Hodgman	Andrew Anastasios & Marcia Gardner	24 July 2018	82,000
65	7	"The Edge"	Sian Davies	Pete McTighe	31 July 2018	77,000
66	8	"Lovers and Fighters"	Sian Davies	John Ridley and Marcia Gardner	7 August 2018	91,000
67	9	"Shallow Grave"	Fiona Banks	John Ridley	14 August 2018	91,000
68	10	"Fractured"	Fiona Banks	Pete McTighe	21 August 2018	103,000
69	11	"Indelible Ink"	Kevin Carlin	John Ridley & Marcia Gardner	28 August 2018	82,000
70	12	"Showdown"	Kevin Carlin	Pete McTighe	4 September 2018	102,000

=== Season 7 (2019) ===
No. overall	No. in season	Title	Directed by	Written by	Original release date	Aus. viewers
71	1	"Blood Wedding"	Kevin Carlin	Marcia Gardner	28 May 2019	89,000
72	2	"Payback"	Kevin Carlin	John Ridley	4 June 2019	96,000
73	3	"Atonement"	Jonathan Brough	Max Conroy	11 June 2019	88,000
74	4	"Karen"	Jonathan Brough	Pete McTighe	18 June 2019	86,000
75	5	"Ascension"	Beck Cole	Pete McTighe	25 June 2019	86,000
76	6	"Mother"	Beck Cole	John Ridley	2 July 2019	72,000
77	7	"Bad Blood"	Fiona Banks	Marcia Gardner	9 July 2019	94,000
78	8	"Protection"	Fiona Banks	Max Conroy	16 July 2019	103,000
79	9	"Under Siege, Part 1"	Kevin Carlin	John Ridley	23 July 2019	91,000
80	10	"Under Siege, Part 2"	Kevin Carlin	Pete McTighe	30 July 2019	110,000

=== Season 8 (2020−21) ===
No. overall	No. in season	Title	Directed by	Written by	Original release date	Aus. viewers
Part 1: Redemption
81	1	"Resurrection"	Kevin Carlin	Pete McTighe	28 July 2020	107,000
82	2	"Ends and Means"	Kevin Carlin	Max Conroy & Kim Wilson	4 August 2020	78,000
83	3	"Enemy of the State"	Beck Cole	Marcia Gardner	11 August 2020	73,000
84	4	"Revenant"	Beck Cole	John Ridley	18 August 2020	59,000
85	5	"Fallout"	Fiona Banks	Pete McTighe	25 August 2020	65,000
86	6	"Fugitive"	Fiona Banks	Marcia Gardner	1 September 2020	56,000
87	7	"Battle Lines"	Corrie Chen	Max Conroy & Kim Wilson	8 September 2020	62,000
88	8	"Goldfish, Part 2"	Corrie Chen	John Ridley	15 September 2020	54,000
89	9	"Monster"	Kevin Carlin	John Ridley	22 September 2020	46,000
90	10	"The Enemy Within"	Kevin Carlin	Marcia Gardner	29 September 2020	65,000
Part 2: The Final Sentence
91	11	"Rogue"	Fiona Banks	Kim Wilson	24 August 2021	55,000
92	12	"Requiem"	Fiona Banks	Marcia Gardner	31 August 2021	53,000
93	13	"The Ties That Bind"	Roger Hodgman	John Ridley	7 September 2021	72,000
94	14	"Judas Kiss"	Roger Hodgman	John Ridley	14 September 2021	46,000
95	15	"The Unknown Terrorist"	Mat King	Kim Wilson	21 September 2021	68,000
96	16	"One Eye Open"	Mat King	John Ridley	28 September 2021	51,000
97	17	"Collateral"	Beck Cole	John Ridley	5 October 2021	57,000
98	18	"The Abyss"	Beck Cole	Kim Wilson	12 October 2021	67,000
99	19	"The Reckoning"	Kevin Carlin	John Ridley	19 October 2021	64,000
100	20	"Legacy"	Kevin Carlin	John Ridley	26 October 2021	73,000

== Ratings ==
Wentworth : Australia viewers per episode (thousands)

Season	Episode number												Average
Season	1	2	3	4	5	6	7	8	9	10	11	12	Average
1	244	102	110	97	115	92	97	82	77	125	–		114
2	75	99	95	66	64	100	68	79	87	81	86	103	84
3	100	94	98	102	97	118	104	108	108	127	109	113	107
4	140	97	81	97	103	119	121	84	110	110	123	95	107
5	101	96	88	85	79	80	83	73	74	81	81	119	87
6	101	87	105	83	71	82	77	91	91	103	82	102	90
7	89	96	88	86	86	72	94	103	91	110	–		92
8A	107	78	73	59	65	56	62	54	46	65	–		67
8B	55	53	72	46	68	51	57	67	64	73	–		61

Source: Audience measurement performed by OzTam
