= Wentworth: Halfway Home =

- Also known as: Wentworth: Beyond Bars
- Genre: Drama
- Based on: Prisoner by Reg Watson Wentworth by: Lara Radulovich; David Hannam
- Starring: Katrina Milosevic; Nicole da Silva; Kate Box; Nadine Garner; Alex King; Chenile Chandler; Rachel Griffiths; Sophie Lowe
- Country of origin: Australia
- Original language: English

Production
- Executive producers: Carly Heaton; Brett Popplewell
- Producer: Dean O'Toole
- Production company: Fremantle Australia

Original release
- Network: Foxtel; Binge

Related
- Prisoner; Wentworth

Wentworth: Halfway Home is an upcoming Australian television drama series which is set to premiere on 7 December 2026, on Showcase and Binge. A spinoff sequel to Wentworth, which was also produced by Fremantle Australia, the series focuses on Boomer Jenkins' life after being released from Wentworth, and follows the lives of parolees and their challenges in life after prison.

The series will premiere in the UK on 8 December 2026, under the title Wentworth: Beyond Bars.

== Plot ==
After her time at Wentworth Correctional Centre, newly paroled Susan 'Boomer' Jenkins arrives at The Sally Lee Halfway House determined to rebuild her life and fight for the custody of her daughter. But when a dead body of one of the residents shows up, and everyone is a suspect, she realizes that while getting out of prison was hard, managing to stay out may be even harder.

== Cast ==
On 24 July 2026, Binge announced Nicole da Silva, Katrina Milosevic and Kate Box would return with Alex King and Chenile Chandler as new faces.

- Nicole da Silva as Franky Doyle
- Kate Box as Lou Kelly
- Katrina Milosevic as Sue 'Boomer' Jenkins
- Alex King as Dee
- Chenile Chandler as Lily
- Rachel Griffiths as Moira
- Sophie Lowe as Sam
- Nadine Garner as Josie Simmons
- Daniel Henshall as Vince
- Claude Jabbour as Nick
- Elaine Crombie as May
- Grace Chow as Katie
- Sara West as Trina
- Laura Gordon as Penelope
- Thom Green as Tom Cavendish
- Chika Ikogwe as Kelechi

== Production ==
On 6 February 2026, during the 2026 AACTA Awards, Danielle Cormack and Binge announced that a Wentworth spinoff was in active pre-production, with it announced that the series would follow fan favourites in life after being incarcerated.

On 24 July 2026, it was announced by Binge that Wentworth: Halfway Home had officially begun production in Melbourne, with Nicole da Silva, Katrina Milosevic and Kate Box announced to be returning as Franky Doyle, Sue "Boomer" Jenkins, and Lou Kelly, respectively with further cast announcements to be announced, the series is expected to air on Binge in late 2026.

Vic Screen CEO Caroline Pitcher saying that "Wentworth remains one of Victoria's greatest screen success stories. We are proud to support the next iteration of Wentworth and look forward to audiences around the world reuniting with Boomer, Lou and Franky in the dramatic next chapter."

During Foxtel/Binge's annual upfronts in September 2026, Rachel Griffiths and Sophie Lowe were both announced to join the series cast. On 26 October 2026, on the fifth anniversary of Wentworth's ending, Binge released a teaser trailer featuring Katrina Milosevic (Boomer) and Jacquie Brennan (Linda Miles) and a cast announcement with a further nine actors joining the production, including Nadine Garner as Josie Simmons, who runs the Sally Lee House.

On 29 October 2026, the UK broadcaster Channel 5 announced that they had secured the rights to air the spinoff under the original working title of Wentworth: Beyond Bars. it will air the day after it airs in Australia on 8 December 2026.

On 9 November 2026, Binge announced that the series would air from 7 December 2026 on both Binge and Foxtel Showcase.

== Episodes ==
=== Season 1 ===
Episode No.	Title	Directed by	Written by	Original release date
1				7 December 2026
2				
3				
4				
5				
6				
7				
8				
9				
10				
11				
12				
