= Erotic Stories =

Australian anthology television series (2023)

- Written by: Tamara Asmar; Alistair Baldwin; Christine Bartlett; Adrian Chiarella; Marieke Hardy; Sara Khan; Jean Tong; Sarah L. Walker
- Directed by: Leticia Cáceres; Madeleine Gottlieb
- Country of origin: Australia
- Original language: English
- No. of seasons: 1
- No. of episodes: 8

Production
- Producer: Helen Bowden
- Cinematography: Tania Lambert; Drew English; Kate Cornish
- Editors: Christine Cheung; Ariel Shaw
- Running time: 26 minutes

Original release
- Network: SBS Television
- Release: October 26, 2023 – present

Erotic Stories is an Australian anthology television series aired on SBS Television and SBS on Demand. Premiering on 26 October 2023, season 1 consisted of eight half-hour stories each scripted by a different writer.

== Cast ==
- Frances O'Connor as Annabel
- Catherine McClements as Sam
- Kate Box as Cara
- Rarriwuy Hick as Kiarra
- Zahra Newman as Leila
- Danielle Cormack as Ginger
- Mark Coles Smith as Manny
- Tim Draxl as Jet
- Bert La Bonté as George
- Victoria Haralabidou as Toni
- Fayssal Bazzi as Aldo
- Rachel Gordon as Sandra
- Cheree Cassidy as Fiona
- Rebecca Massey as Roz

== Episodes ==
No.	Title	Starring
1	"Philia"	Catherine McClements, Bert La Bonté
2	"The Deluge"	Danielle Cormack, Kate Box, Emily Havea
3	"Bound"	Joel Lago, Tim Draxl
4	"Powerful Owl"	Rarriwuy Hick, Googoorewon Knox, Callan Colley
5	"Walking Gambit"	Yuchen Wang, Dominic Ona-Ariki, Fayssal Bazzi
6	"Imperfect Paw Paw"	Mark Coles Smith, Zahra Newman, Alex Stamell
7	"Come As You Are"	Frances O'Connor, Alex Fitzalan
8	"Masc Up"	Bernie Van Tiel, Karis Oka

== Reception ==
Debi Enker of The Sydney Morning Herald gave it 4 stars out of 5, summing up "Overall, though, Erotic Stories achieves what SBS promised, with an array of characters portraying the kinds of desires, frustrations and fears that are everywhere felt".

Giselle Au-Nhien Nguyen wrote in The Guardian, "Erotic Stories is probably somewhat of a misnomer – these stories encourage reflection more so than arousal" and also suggested that the "mix of voices and styles" worked better for some than others in the allotted time. She awarded 3 stars.

== Accolades ==
Year	Award	Category	Nominee	Result	Ref
2023	Screen Well Awards	Production of the Year	Erotic Stories	Won	
2024	AACTA Awards	Best Television Drama Series	Erotic Stories	Nominated	
2024	AACTA Awards	Best Lead Actor in a Television Drama	Joel Lago	Nominated	
2024	AACTA Awards	Best Lead Actress in a Television Drama	Kate Box	Nominated	
2024	AACTA Awards	Best Supporting Actor in Drama	Tim Draxl	Nominated	
2024	AACTA Awards	Best Cinematography in Television	Tania Lambert	Nominated	
2024	Logie Awards	Best Miniseries or Telemovie	Erotic Stories	Nominated	
2024	Casting Guild of Australia Awards	Best Casting in a TV Drama	Erotic Stories	Nominated	
2025	AWGIE Awards	Television – Series	Adrian Chiarella for "Walking Gambit"	Won	
