= Ellie & Abbie (& Ellie's Dead Aunt) =

2020 Australian LGBT romance comedy film written and directed by Monica Zanetti

- Film poster
- Directed by: Monica Zanetti
- Written by: Monica Zanetti
- Based on: Ellie & Abbie (& Ellie's Dead Aunt) by Monica Zanetti
- Produced by: Mahveen Shahraki Patrick James
- Starring: Sophie Hawkshaw; Zoe Terakes; Marta Dusseldorp; Rachel House; Julia Billington; Bridie Connell
- Cinematography: Calum Stewart
- Edited by: Nicole Thorn
- Music by: David Chapman
- Production company: Head Gear Films
- Distributed by: Arcadia
- Release date: 13 February 2020
- Running time: 82 minutes
- Country: Australia
- Language: English
- Box office: $19,940

Ellie & Abbie (& Ellie's Dead Aunt) is a 2020 AACTA award-winning LGBT romance comedy film written and directed by Monica Zanetti, in her feature directorial debut. It is based on her own 2016 stage play. The film stars Sophie Hawkshaw, Zoe Terakes, Marta Dusseldorp, Rachel House, Julia Billington and Bridie Connell. The movie had its world premiere at the Mardi Gras Film Festival on 13 February 2020, becoming the first Australian film to do so in the festival's 27-year history. It also won the Audience Award for Best Narrative Film at the festival. The film went on to screenings at several other film festivals, and had a limited theatrical release on 19 November 2020.

== Synopsis ==
Seventeen year old Ellie comes out to her mother in a very blunt manner, and her mother is stunned by her daughter's out and proud attitude. Ellie wants to ask her classmate Abbie to the formal, but is reluctant and nervous about doing so. On her journey of summoning the courage to ask Abbie out, or in the alternative, being rejected, she gets advice from her living Aunt Patty, and is also being advised by her deceased Aunt Tara, an LGBT rights activist who died in the 1980s. Aunt Tara doesn't want to be called a ghost though, but rather a 'fairy' godmother.

== Cast ==
- Sophie Hawkshaw as Ellie
- Zoe Terakes as Abbie
- Marta Dusseldorp as Erica
- Rachel House as Patty
- Julia Billington as Tara
- Bridie Connell as Miss Trimble
- Randall Hua as Jamie

== Production notes ==
The film is based on Zanetti's 2016 independent stage play. She told The Sydney Morning Herald that the play's constructive response persuaded her to adapt it into a film. However she had a stipulation that the film feature, at a minimum, a fifty per cent LGBT cast. When she went looking for funding for the project, she was swiftly met with resistance from skittish distributors and sales agents. She told The Herald; "If you want to have a queer cast that's fine but you need to surround that with famous people to have a chance". Frustrated by the lack of funding, she realised that alternative funding was her only choice, so Zanetti relied on a crowdfunding strategy to raise $50,000 for a production budget. That amount was matched by Creative Partnerships Australia's Match Lab program. They went to work on the film, and after making a teaser trailer, she went to Cannes Film Festival, where Zanetti procured the film company Arcadia as a distributor. The film was shot entirely on location in Sydney.

== Release ==
The film had its world premiere on 13 February 2020 as the first Australian feature to open the Mardi Gras Film Festival in its 27-year history. It had a screening at the Melbourne International Film Festival in August 2020, three additional screenings in October at the Brisbane Queer Film Festival, the New York Lesbian, Gay, Bisexual, & Transgender Film Festival and the Reel Affirmations. It then had a limited theatrical release on 19 November 2020, where it grossed $4,547 in its opening weekend. The films worldwide gross at the box office was only $19,940

== Critical reception ==
The film won the 2021 AACTA Award for Best Indie Film and was also nominated for "Best Original Screenplay.

Dougal Macdonald wrote in his review for the Canberra City News that all the actors "give fine performances", but one of the film's "shortcomings" was the sound not being "as clear as it should be". He also noted the ending is a "bit awkward", as Abbie turns up at the formal wearing "jodhpurs and riding boots". Special Broadcasting Services Stephen Russell said the mostly female cast and crew which has, "significant LGBTQIA+ representation is refreshing...as is the decision to sidestep well-worn trauma tropes, while not shying away from typical teenage crises". Screen Hub Australia said Zanetti "doesn’t focus on tired fish-out-of-water comedy...and she finds humour in how extremely ordinary it is for Ellie to come out in 2020 and how universally awkward teenage crushes remain".

Sean Maunier of LGBT Metro Weekly said the performances from a predominantly LGBTQ cast were "heartfelt" and contributed to the film possessing a "sense of immediacy and warmth". Maunier went on to say that Zanetti's "compassion and empathy" permitted her to provide a film that is "light-hearted without being dismissive, poignant without being preachy...and she skillfully weaves together comedy and drama to tell a beautiful, affirming story of young love". Robert Moran of The Sydney Morning Herald said the movie "bucks the usual clichés of stories about queer teens: there's no angsty coming out, no conflicted reckoning about being gay...it's just a family-friendly queer romantic comedy. The Guardian gave the film four out of five stars and said "the banter between Abbie and Ellie deserves to go down in the annals of the romcom genre".

== See also ==
- List of Australian films
- List of LGBT-related films directed by women
- Cinema of Australia
