= Katrina Milosevic =

Australian actress

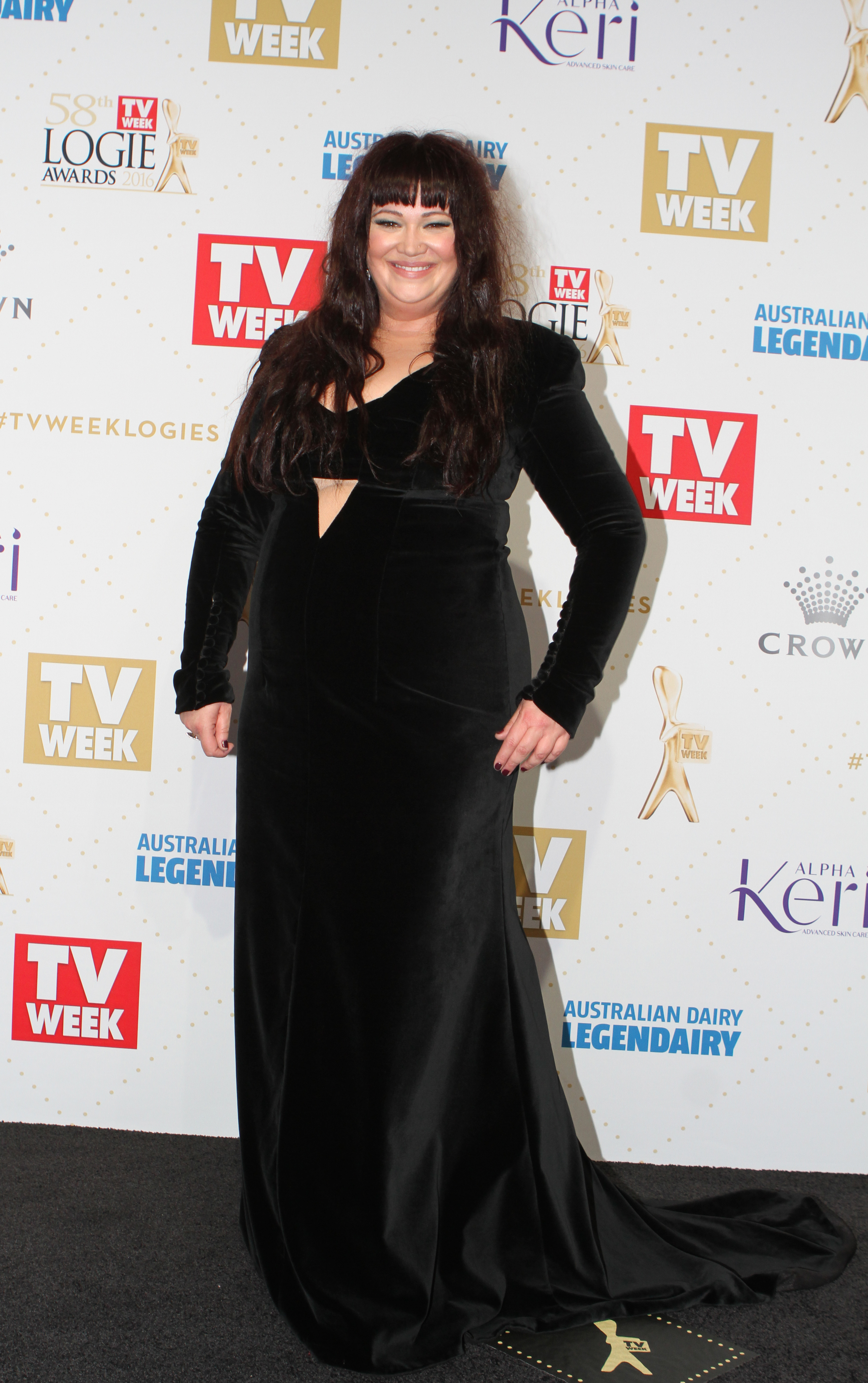
- Born: 25 April 1976 (age 50); Mount Isa, Australia
- Occupation: Actress
- Years active: 2000–present
- Notable work: Stingers (2000, 2003–2004); Wentworth (2013–21) SeaChange (2019)

Katrina Milosevic (born 25 April 1976) is an Australian actress who has appeared in many television programs and theatre productions, including a starring role in the prison drama series Wentworth as Sue 'Boomer' Jenkins. and as Sophie Novak on Police Drama Stingers (TV series).

== Early life and education ==
Katrina Milosevic was born in Mount Isa, Australia on 25 April 1976. She graduated from Australia's National Institute of Dramatic Art (NIDA) in 1997 with a degree in Performing Arts and went on to work on series The Games and Blue Heelers. In 2003, she was cast in the regular role of Sophie Novak in Stingers, which saw her nominated for the Most Popular New Talent Female at the 2004 Logie awards. She remained with the show for two seasons.

== Career ==
Milosevic appeared in the 2005 Nine Network telemovie Little Oberon and in September 2006 she joined the Sydney Theatre Company's adaptation of the Neil LaBute play, Fat Pig.

Milosevic joined the cast of Neighbours as Kelly Katsis, a love interest for Toadfish Rebecchi (Ryan Moloney) in 2008. Milosevic's father died during her first week on set and she said that working on the show was what she needed at that time. Milosevic left Neighbours in February 2009.

In 2010, Milosevic joined the Sydney Theatre Company's adaptation of Gross und Klein (Big and Small). The play premiered at the Sydney Theatre in 2011, before it went on tour in Europe in early 2012.

Milosevic had a starring role in Wentworth as Sue "Boomer" Jenkins since 2013. Katrina appeared in all 100 episodes of Wentworth and was one of the 'Wentworth Four' and was gifted a placard for the 'Wentworth 100 Club' alongside Kate Atkinson, Jacquie Brennan and Robbie Magasiva.

Milosevic revealed in the Wentworth Unlocked special that the show gave her a place to 'channel her grief' as she had lost her mother during filming of the show she said this show kept me afloat. It gave me somewhere to put all my grief. and said it was a once in a lifetime series that changed her life.

In 2022, Milosevic appeared alongside several Wentworth cast members for Wentworth Con Melbourne.

Milosevic appeared in the fifth and final season of Winners & Losers.

In 2019, Milosevic appeared in season 4 of channel 9 drama SeaChange alongside Wentworth co-star Sigrid Thornton.

She also has a recurring role on Glitch. Milosevic also appeared in Paramount+ Australia original series, Spreadsheet in the role of Angie.

In 2024, Milosevic was announced as part of the cast for Stan series Population 11. On 30 June 2025, Milosevic was announced in the guest cast for the second series of ABC series Austin. On 17 June 2026, Milosevic was named in the extended cast for Stan film Scales. 24 July 2026, Binge announced that Milosevic would return as Boomer Jenkins in the Wentworth spinoff series Wentworth: Halfway Home.

== Filmography ==
=== Film ===
Year	Title	Role	Notes
2005	Little Oberon	Fatima	Television film
2008	Uncle Jonny	Auntie Louise	Short film
2010	I Love You Too	Rebecca	
2010	Elephantiasis	Meredith	Short film
2014	Shotgun Wedding	Cleo	Short film
TBA	Scales	TBA	Film

=== Television ===
Year	Title	Role	Notes
2000	The Games	First Irate Questioner, Katrina	2 episodes
2000, 2002–2003	Blue Heelers	Cheryl Anne Phillips, Raelene Clarke	3 episodes
2000, 2003–2004	Stingers	Darlene Stockwell-Wallace /Sophie Novak	69 episodes
2008–2009	Neighbours	Kelly Katsis	27 episodes
2009	City Homicide	Cassie Holmes	Episode: "Dead Weight"
2009	Rush	Karissa	Episode: "Episode #2.21"
2010	Sleuth 101	Gil	Episode: "Delete Cache"
2012	Laid	Wheelchair Pam	Episode: "Episode #2.1"
2013	Mr & Mrs Murder	Eve Blake	Episode: "A Dog's Life"
2013–2021	Wentworth	Sue "Boomer" Jenkins	100 episodes
2013	Twentysomething	Career Counsellor	Episode: "Everyone Loves a Comeback"
2016	Winners & Losers	Eliza Dempsey	3 episodes
2016	Offspring	Anna	Episode: "Fallout"
2017	Seven Types of Ambiguity	Claire	2 episodes
2017	Glitch	Ellen	4 episodes
2019	Seachange	Anna Kazan	8 episodes
2021	Spreadsheet	Angie	6 episodes
2024	Population 11	Sgt. Geraldine Walters	TV Series; 10 episodes
2024	Human Error	Rose Starry	TV Series: 5 episodes
2025	Austin	Agatha	TV series: 5 episodes
2026-present	Wentworth: Halfway Home	Sue 'Boomer' Jenkins	TV series

=== Other appearances ===
Year	Title	Role	Notes	Ref
2016	An Audience With the cast of Wentworth	Self	TV Special	
2016	Thinkergirl Pod	Self	Podcast	
2017	Wentworth: Interrogation Room	Self	Q and A Video	
2017	Tag Team	Self	Podcast	
2017	The Chrissie Swan Show	Self	Radio	
2018	The Chrissie Swan Show	Self	Radio	
2019	Wentworth: Behind the Bars	Self	TV Special	
2020	The Scott Emerson Drive Show	Self	Podcast	
2020	Wentworth: Behind the Bars 2	Self		
2020	Wentworth: Screen Fest	Self		
2021	TV Reload	Self	Podcast	
2021	Wentworth Reunion Event	Self	TV Special	
2021	Saluting Wentworth	Self	Special	
2021	Hot off the Press	Self	1 episode	
2021	Wentworth Unlocked	Self		

== Stage ==
Milosevic has appeared in numerous stage performances. In 2016, Milosevic appeared in The Distance.

Year	Title	Role	Notes	Ref
2021	The Truth	Alice	MTC	
2016	The Distance		Southbank Theatre	
2011	Gross and Klein		STC	
2008	Fat Pig	Helen	STC	
