= Zoe Terakes =

Australian actor

- Born: Australia
- Occupation: Actor
- Years active: 2017–present

Zoe Terakes (/təˈrækɪs/) is an Australian actor. They (Note: Terakes uses they/them and he/him pronouns. This article uses they/them for consistency.) are known for playing Reb Keane in the series Wentworth (2020–2021) and Hayley in the horror film Talk to Me (2022).

== Early life and education ==
Terakes attended SCEGGS Darlinghurst for high school. Terakes had not considered acting as a career, until their grade 11 drama teacher recommended visiting an agent who ended up securing their work. They completed their HSC whilst appearing on stage in A View from the Bridge, a theatre production in Sydney from director Iain Sinclair.

== Career ==
Their work on A View from the Bridge led them to receive Sydney Theatre Awards for Best Female Actor in a Supporting Role in an Independent Production, and as joint winner, the Best Newcomer Award. The production also scored Terakes a Helpmann Award nomination.

At the age of 17, Terakes made their on-screen debut in the role of Pearl Perati, a homeless teenager, in ABC's Janet King alongside Marta Dusseldorp.

Other theatre credits of Terakes include Metamorphoses and The Wolves for The Old Fitz and Henrik Ibsen's theatre production of A Doll's House Part 2 at the Melbourne Theatre Company.

Terakes played Reb Keane, a trans man, in season eight of Australian TV series Wentworth, the critically acclaimed reboot of Prisoner: Cell Block H. About the experience of obtaining the role, Terakes stated: "I really fought for it. I emailed the producers to let them know how important it was to have a trans person telling this story. It was also terrifying, because suddenly I had the role and I felt the weight of the trans community on my shoulders. I didn't want to get it wrong." Their character, Reb, was a trans man and was terrified of being sentenced to prison after a robbery goes wrong.

In 2020, the feature film Ellie & Abbie (& Ellie's Dead Aunt) was released where Terakes plays the title role of Abbie. In the same year, Terakes appeared in the Foxtel drama about euthanasia titled The End.

In 2021, Terakes played wellness retreat worker Glory alongside Nicole Kidman, Asher Keddie and Melissa McCarthy in Nine Perfect Strangers.

In 2022, Terakes joined the cast of the Marvel project Ironheart.

In 2023, Terakes appeared in Australian horror film Talk To Me and appeared in 2 episodes of Creamerie. While Talk to Me garnered success during its release, it was banned in Kuwait, reportedly for Terakes' appearance in the film. Terakes expressed their disappointment about the news on social media. On 9 August, the Kuwaiti authority formally announced the ban of Talk to Me, claiming that it was to protect "public ethics and social traditions".

In 2023, Terakes was nominated for Best Supporting Actor for Talk To Me and took out GQ's Actor of the Year Award. On 19 August 2024, Terakes was named as part of the cast for the Australian adaptation of The Office.

On 22 November, it was announced that Terakes had joined the filming of the feature film Pickpockets.

Terakes released Eros: Queer Myths for Lovers in 2025, a chronicling of ancient Greek myths through a lens of queerness. The book is Terakes' publishing debut.

== Personal life ==
Terakes is of Greek ancestry, hailing from the island of Crete. They came out to the acting industry as non-binary and transmasculine at the age of 19. In 2022, Terakes confirmed news of their gender-affirming surgery.

In November 2020, Terakes signed a petition criticizing the lack of LGBTQ representation in the Australian production of Hedwig and the Angry Inch and expressing "disappointment" over the casting of actor Hugh Sheridan in the lead role of Hedwig, whom many believe to be a transgender character. They, along with David Campbell, Michala Banas, and others, shared an open letter on Instagram addressed to the Sydney Festival, explaining why trans representation is vital when telling the story of a trans character. The Australian producers, Showtune Productions, cancelled the show. Sheridan later came out as non-binary in an Instagram post on 26 June 2021, and also bisexual, speaking of the hurt and serious mental health issues that arose from the cyberbullying around this incident.

== Filmography ==
=== Film ===
Year	Title	Role	Notes
2018	The Craft	Priscilla	Short film
2020	Her Own Music	Tessa	Short film
2020	Sunburn	Em	Short film
2020	Ellie & Abbie (& Ellie's Dead Aunt)	Abbie	
2021	Right Here		Short film
2021	Are You Still Watching?	Jamie	Short film
2022	Unravelling	Chook	
2022	Talk to Me	Hayley	
TBA	Pickpockets †	TBA	Post-production

=== Television ===
Year	Title	Role	Notes
2017	Janet King	Pearl Perati	Recurring role; 7 episodes
2020	The End	Scarlet	2 episodes
2020	Bondi Slayer	Kristy	1 episode
2020–2021	Wentworth	Reb Keane	Recurring role; 12 episodes
2021	The Moth Effect	Employee	2 episodes; miniseries
2021	Nine Perfect Strangers	Glory	Main role
2023	Creamerie	Sea Captain	2 episodes
2024	The Office	Stevie	Main role; 5 episodes
2025	Ironheart	Jeri Blood	6 episodes

== Awards and nominations ==
Year	Award	Category	Work	Result
2021	AACTA	Best Lead Actor	Ellie and Abbie	Nominated
2023	GQ	GQ Actor of the Year	Themselves	Won
2024	AACTA Award	Best Supporting Actor	Talk to Me	Nominated
