= Emily Havea =

Australian actress

Emily Havea is an Australian stage, film and television actress best known for her roles in Wentworth, The Secrets She Keeps and Erotic Stories. Havea also played Curly in the production of Oklahoma!.

== Career ==
In 2020 Havea appeared in the play Brown Skin Girl which was one of 16 productions that performed through Griffin Theatre's Batch Festival. In 2020, Havea appeared as Curly in the Black Swan Theatre Co's production of Oklahoma! the role notably performed by men

In 2022, Havea appeared in SBS series Latecomers. Havea would also serve on the writing team of Stan series Year Of. Havea also returned to the Melbourne Theatre Company for the first time after graduating from NIDA in 2014 for the play Fun Home. In April 2023, Havea was named in the cast for SBS anthology series Erotic Stories.

In 2025, Havea appeared in the ensemble for Malthouse Theatre's play Truth based on Julian Assange.

== Filmography ==
=== Television appearances ===
Year	Title	Role	Notes
2025	Mother and Son	Jenny	1 episode
2025	The Last Anniversary	Audrey	4 episodes
2025	Home and Away	Anita Khurana	2 episodes
2023	Erotic Stories	Lili	1 episode (The Deluge)
2023	Safe Home	Jemima Long	2 episodes
2022	Latecomers	Sofia	2 episodes
2022	Darby and Joan	Nicola	1 episode
2022	Death Doula	Jac	TV series
2018-20	Wentworth	Mon Alston	11 episodes
2020	The Secrets She Keeps	Lisa-Jayne Soussa	4 episodes
2019	Harrow	Turua Parata	1 episode
2018	Resting Pitch Face	Olivia	3 episodes
2017	Sisters	Make up Artist	2 episodes

=== Film appearances ===
Year	Title	Role	Notes
2024	The Fall Guy	NYC Medic	Film
2023	Rhyme Time	Mara	Short
2022	A Perfect Pairing	Sam	
2021	Marley,Someone	Sloane	
2021	Right Here		Short
2019	Suburban Wildlife	Aleea	
2018	The Obscure	Monkey	Short
2018	Letting You Know Me	New Housemate	
2018	Upgrade	Nurse Henderson	
2015	Submerge	Milo	Short

=== Theatre ===
Year	Title	Role	Notes	Ref
2025	Orlando	Princess Sasha	Belvoir St	
2025	Truth	Ensemble	Malthouse Theatre	
2023	Gentleman Prefer Blondes	Dorothy	Hayes Theatre Co	
2022	Fun Home	Joan	Melbourne Theatre Co	
2021	Fun Home	Joan	Melbourne Theatre Co	
2021	Wherever She Wanders	Nikki	Griffin Theatre Co	
2020	Oklahoma!	Curly	Black Swan	
2019	Grounded	The Pilot	National Theatre Parramatta	
2018	Julius Caesar	Calphurnia and Octavius	Bell Shakespeare	
2018	Brown Skin Girl	Emily	Black Birds Festival	
