= Kate Box =

Australian actress (born 1979)

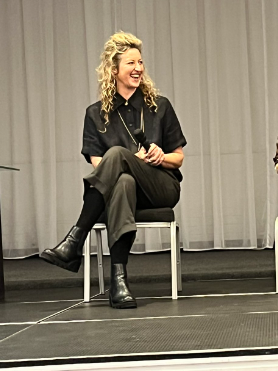
- Box at event
- Born: 28 October 1979 (age 47); Australia
- Occupation: Actress
- Years active: 2004–present
- Notable work: Rake (2010–18); Wentworth (2020–21); Deadloch (2023-Present)
- Height: 6 ft 0 in (183 cm)
- Partner: Jada Alberts (2009–?)
- Children: 3

Kate Box (born 28 October 1979) is an Australian stage, film, and television actress. She is known for her roles as Nicole Vargas in Rake, Lou Kelly in Wentworth, and as Dulcie Collins in Deadloch.

== Early life and education ==
Kate Box grew up in Adelaide, South Australia. She lived with her parents, social workers Greg and Lorraine, and sister Sally in Colonel Light Gardens, and attended the local primary school.

She did her secondary education at Annesley College. At the age of 13 she started classes at Unley Youth Theatre (now Urban Myth), where she met filmmakers Sophie Hyde and Matthew Cormack, who went on to form Closer Productions, and screenwriter Drew Proffitt.

Box started a bachelor of arts degree at the University of Adelaide aged 17, intending to major in psychology, but changed her mind and graduated with politics and Australian studies as her major subjects. She then auditioned for the Victorian College of the Arts and National Institute of Dramatic Art (NIDA). She was accepted into NIDA course and, at the age of 22, moved to Sydney. She graduated from NIDA in 2003.

== Career ==
=== Stage ===
Her first stage performance was in 2004 as Helena in A Midsummer Night's Dream at the Bell Shakespeare Company. Her role in the Sydney Theatre Company presentation of Top Girls earned her a Helpmann Award for Best Female Actor in a Supporting Role in a Play nomination in 2018. Other stage credits include Dolores (Old Fitzroy Theatre), Macbeth (Sydney Theatre Company) and A Christmas Carol (Belvoir).

=== Screen ===
She went on to make her screen debut with a role in the 2005 television film sequel Small Claims: White Wedding. Following this, she made her film debut in 2008 with The Black Balloon and she received guest spots on television shows such as the medical drama series All Saints and the children's drama series My Place.

Her performance in the 2014 comedy film The Little Death earned her a nomination for best actress in a leading role in the AACTA Awards.

She came to prominence with her role as Nicole Vargas in the ABC comedy-drama series Rake for which she appeared throughout its entire run. During her run on Rake, Box was cast in popular television series including Offspring, Old School, and the six-part Closer Productions comedy drama mini-series Fucking Adelaide (2018). The story follows three siblings who reunite back in Adelaide after some time, when their mother decides to sell the family home.

Box played Marg McMann in the 2018 television film Riot, a film focusing on the LGBTI rights movement and the origins of the Sydney Gay and Lesbian Mardi Gras in the 1970s, a role which won her the AACTA Award for Best Lead Actress in a Television Drama, and the role of which she is most proud, saying "I was so grateful to walk with that character for a bit because the courage that she displayed definitely helped me to live my life with more truth and courage". Winning the AACTA for the performance was especially meaningful for her, because it gave her the opportunity to stand "front and centre" of issues relating to gay rights and acceptance of LGBTQIA+ people.

In 2019 Box appeared in Upright, with Tim Minchin, and in Les Norton.

In 2019, it was announced Box was cast in the role of "legacy" character Lou Kelly in the Foxtel prison drama series Wentworth for its eighth and final season. Also in 2019, Box was announced as a cast member in the Cate Blanchett-produced Matchbox Pictures series, Stateless, released in 2020.

Box played a leading role in the "Tasmanian noir crime comedy" TV series, Deadloch, written by Kate McCartney and Kate McLennan. The eight-part series by Australian Amazon Original was released in 2023 to positive reviews. Box revealed in an interview in August 2024 that she had originally auditioned for the part of Eddie Redcliffe.

Box appears in the SBS anthology series Erotic Stories (2023), in the episode "The Deluge", as Cara.

In November 2023 Box was announced for the upcoming ABC television series Ladies in Black.

Box plays Dr Brennan in the seven-part Netflix adaptation of Trent Dalton's novel Boy Swallows Universe, aired in January 2024.

Box during the 2024 AACTA awards won the award for Best Acting in a Narrative Comedy for her role in Amazon series Deadloch, Box also delivered a rousing speech for her award win and also said "we are the stories we tell and the ones we don't." Box also used her speech to call for a ceasefire in Gaza and her speech went viral over the following days.

On 9 July 2024, Deadloch would be renewed for another season with Box to reprise the role of Dulcie Collins. On 4 September, it was announced that Box was named as part of the cast for SBS drama series Four Years Later. In 2025, Box would appear in the short film Date 3. On 5 November 2025, Box was named in the cast for upcoming film Croak. On 20 November during ABC's upfronts Box was named for the 2026 series Dustfall.

On 13 April 2026, Box was announced in the cast for upcoming movie Runner. On 24 July 2026, Binge announced that Box was a part of the cast of the new Wentworth spinoff Wentworth: Halfway Home. On 15 October 2026, Box was announced in the cast for ABC series Shakedown based on the Robodebt Centrelink scandal. On 21 October 2026, during ABC's Upfront event for 2027, Box was named as lead for the series Help Me!.

== Personal life ==
Box is openly gay. Since meeting at a playwright's conference in 2009, she has been in a relationship with writer and actor Jada Alberts, who also appeared in Wentworth from 2013 to 2014. They live with their three daughters in a "really affectionate household" in Sydney. In October 2020, they were considering a move back to Adelaide but, as of October 2023, were still in Sydney. During an interview in 2024, Box said she had taken eight months away from acting to look after the kids.

She is a close friend of director Sophie Hyde.

== Awards and nominations ==
Year	Format	Award	Category	Work	Result	Ref
2015	Film	AACTA Award	Best Actress in a Leading Role	The Little Death	Nominated	
2018	Theatre	Helpmann Awards	Best Female Actor in a Supporting Role in a Play	Top Girls	Nominated	
2018	Television	AACTA Award	Best Lead Actress in a Television Drama	Riot	Won	
2018	Television	Logie Awards	Most Outstanding Actress	Riot	Nominated	
2019	Television	Equity Awards	Most Outstanding Performance by an Ensemble in a Television Movie or Miniseries (Note: Award shared with Damon Herriman, Xavier Samuel, Jessica De Gouw and Josh Quong Tart.)	Riot	Won	
2019	Television	AACTA Awards	Best Guest or Supporting Actress in a Television Drama	Les Norton	Nominated	
2024	Television	AACTA Awards	Best Lead Actress in a Drama	Erotic Stories	Nominated	
2024	Television	AACTA Awards	Best Acting in a Narrative Comedy	Deadloch	Won	
2024	Television	Logie Awards	Best Lead Actress in a Comedy	Deadloch	Nominated	
2026	Television	Logie Awards	Best Lead Actress in a Comedy	Deadloch	Nominated	

== Filmography ==
=== Film ===
Year	Title	Role	Notes
2008	The Black Balloon	Elizabeth	Feature film
2010	Oranges and Sunshine	Radio Studio Receptionist	Feature film
2011	Random 8	Frances Austin	Feature film
2011	Hush	Kate	Short film
2014	The Little Death	Rowena	Feature film (also known as A Funny Kind of Love)
2014	You Cut, I Choose	Rosey (27 & 37 Years-Old)	Short film
2015	The Daughter	Julieanne	Feature film
2016	Here is Now	Rachel	Short film
2017	Three Summers	Linda	Feature film
2019	Back of the Net	Coach Smith	Feature film
2019	Way Out Assistance	Rose	Short film
2022	Monolith	Laura (voice)	Feature film
2025	Jimpa	Emily	Feature film
2025	Date 3	Ella	Short
2025	Flight Risk	Border Officer Hanson	Short
2026	Runner	Dr. Ainsley	Film
TBA	Croak	TBA	Feature

=== Television ===
Year	Film	Role	Notes
2005	Small Claims: White Wedding	Nicole	Television film
2006	Tripping Over	Melinda	Season 1 (3 episodes)
2007	All Saints	Mia	Season 10 (1 episode)
2008	Scorched	Annie	Television film
2009	False Witness	Rona Hennessy	Television film (also known as The Diplomat)
2009	My Place	Kath	Season 1 (2 episodes)
2010	Offspring	Alice Havel	Season 1 (6 episodes)
2011	Paper Giants: The Birth of Cleo	Germaine Greer	Miniseries (1 episode)
2014	Old School	Cath Khoury	Season 1 (8 episodes)
2014	Soul Mates	Aunty Hazel	Season 1 (2 episodes)
2015	Australia: The Story of Us	Dr. Ella Stack	Documentary series; Season 1 (1 episode)
2017	Fucking Adelaide	Emma	Miniseries (6 episodes)
2018	Riot	Marg McMann	Television film
2018	Picnic at Hanging Rock	Mrs. Bumpher	Miniseries (3 episodes)
2018	Sheilas	Mina Smith	Miniseries
2010–2018	Rake	Nicole Vargas	Seasons 1–5 (40 episodes)
2018	Wanted	Maxine Middleton	Season 3 (6 episodes)
2019	The Letdown	Nadia	Season 2 (1 episode)
2019	The Unlisted	Emma Ainsworth	Season 1 (6 episodes)
2019	Lucy and DiC	Paige	Animated series; Season 1 (8 episodes)
2019	Les Norton	Lauren "Lozza" Johnson	Season 1 (10 episodes)
2019	Upright	Esme	Miniseries (2 episodes)
2020	Stateless	Janice	Miniseries (6 episodes)
2020–2021	Wentworth	Lou Kelly	Season 8(20 episodes)
2021	The Moth Effect	Various roles	5 episodes
2021	Fires	Ruth	Episode 5
2023–26	Deadloch	Dulcie Collins	14 episodes
2023	Erotic Stories	Cara	1 episode (The Deluge)
2023	Paper Dolls	Helena	3 episodes
2024	Boy Swallows Universe	Dr. Brennan	2 episodes
2024	Ladies in Black	Cheri St Clair	3 episodes
2024	Four Years Later	Gabs	TV series: 6 episodes
2024	Bump	Dr. Maryanne Brant	TV series: 1 episode
2026	My Brilliant Career	Mrs McSwat	TV series (1.6)
2026	Dustfall	Fiona Kelly	TV series
2026	Shakedown	Jenny Miller	TV mini series
2026-present	Wentworth: Halfway Home	Lou Kelly	TV series
2027	Help Me!	Katherine Ivey	TV series

=== Other appearances ===
Year	Title	Role	Notes
2021	Wentworth: Unlocked	Self	TV Special
2020	Wentworth Behind the Bars 2	Self	TV Special
