= Jacqueline Brennan =

Australian actress

Jacquie Brennan
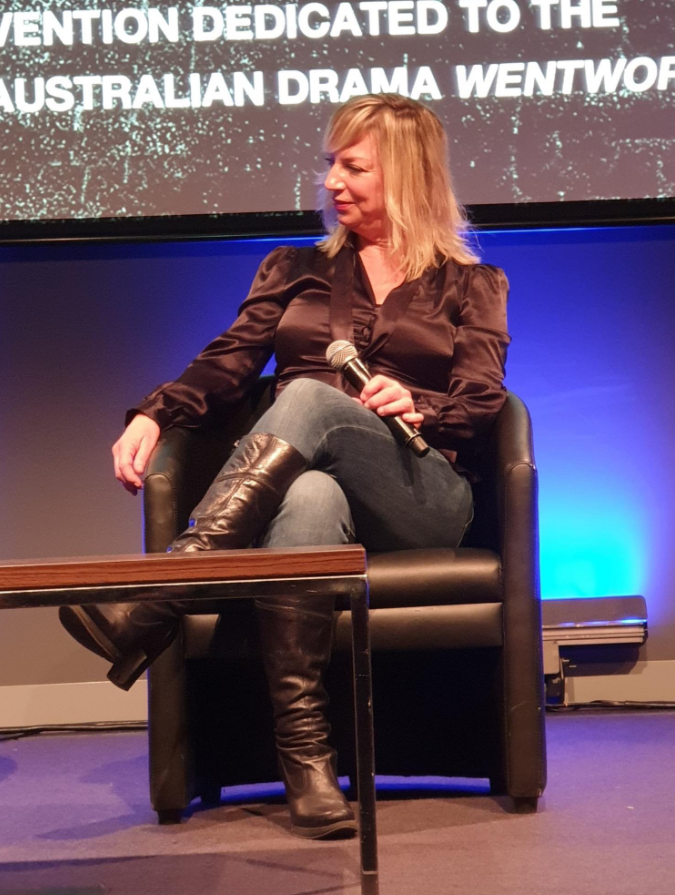
- Education: University of Southern Queensland
- Occupation: Actress
- Years active: 1986–present
- Known for: Wentworth; The Hollowmen; Bullpitt!
- Spouse: Ian Bliss (m. 2001)
- Children: 2

Jacquie Brennan is an Australian stage, television film and theatre actress and voiceover artist. She is known for her roles in Bullpitt!, The Hollowmen, and her best known role in Australian award-winning television drama Wentworth as Officer (later Deputy Governor) Linda 'Smiles' Miles.

== Education ==
Brennan graduated from the University of Southern Queensland with a Diploma of Performing Arts.

== Career ==
=== Theatre ===
Brennan has worked for both Queensland Theatre Company and Sydney Theatre Company, with Camille (1986) and The Merry Wives of Windsor (1987) and Dinkum Assorted (1989) for the former and Milo (1994) for the latter. She wrote and starred in one-woman show Dangerous When Wet in 1991 and toured Australia with 1960s spoof group 'The Harlettes' in 1995.

Her other theatre credits include Room to Move, Camille (both 1986), Australian musical Beach Blanket Tempest (1988), Rosy Apples, Too Darn Hot (both 1990), Macquarie (1998), Silhouette (1999) and a 2001 Australian tour of Are You Being Served?

=== Television ===
In 2008, Brennan was announced as part of the cast for ABC political comedy series The Hollowmen, in the role of press secretary Mel. She appeared in both seasons of the show.

In 2020, Brennan appeared in the Underbelly adaptation Informer 3838, where she played the role of real life figure Christine Hodson, who was a victim of the Melbourne gangland killings. The real life case which still remains open and unsolved, and the $1 million reward for information still stands to this day.

Brennan joined the cast of Wentworth in 2012. She initially came into set as a cast reader, but was asked to read for a 'small role' by the series set-up director, Kevin Carlin. That role however, ultimately ended up being the role of prison officer Linda 'Smiles' Miles. Brennan has since revealed she originally auditioned for the role of Liz Birdsworth. Brennan has since said she was only ever originally contracted on an eight day contract, but lead writer Timothy Hobart kept writing for the character. Her first appearance was in episode 2 of season 1 and she remained part of the supporting cast for the show's entire run, appearing in every season, appearing in all but one episode.

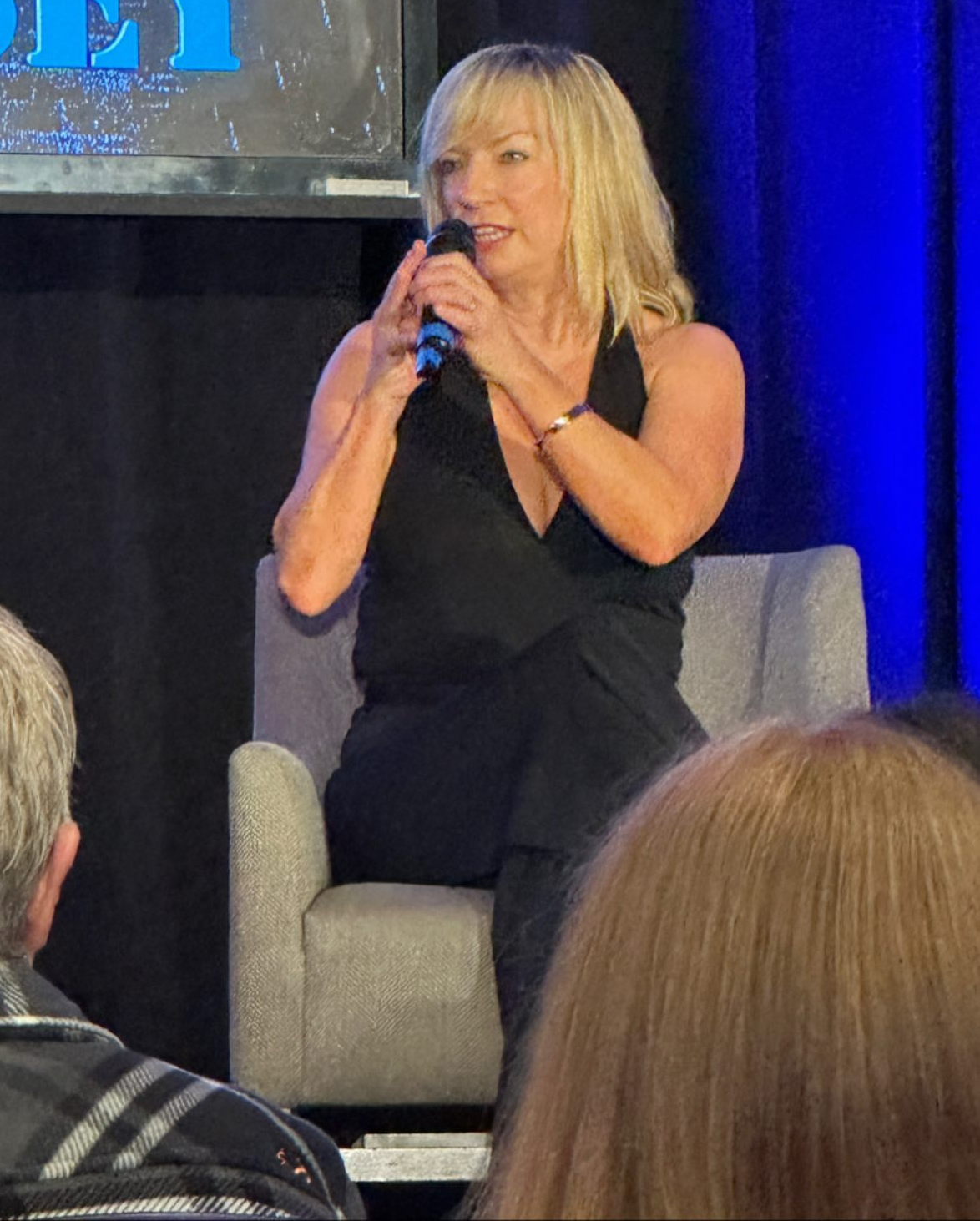
Brennan in attendance at Wentworth Con 2023

Brennan appeared alongside several Wentworth cast members at a Screen Star Event in London and Birmingham in mid-2022 and again at "Wentworth Con", Melbourne in 2022, after withdrawing from the con's New Jersey event due to illness. Brennan appeared for a second event this time in the US and the UK in 2023 for Screen Star Events 15th Year alongside co-star Tammy MacIntosh and Colette Mann.

On 9 November 2022, it was announced that Brennan had been cast in Warnie, a two-part telemovie to air on the Nine Network in 2023 about the late Australian cricketer Shane Warne, alongside Alex Williams. She was cast as Warne's mother Brigitte. The telemovie aired in June 2023.

In 2023, Brennan played Nicole in SBS drama Safe Home, and appeared in season 4 of Paramount+ series Five Bedrooms, reprising the role of Denise Schaap from season one.

On 26 October 2026, Binge released a teaser trailer and a cast announcement for Wentworth: Halfway Home five years to the day of the Wentworth series finale, the teaser showing Boomer Jenkins (Milosevic) and Brennan reprising the role of Linda Miles.

=== Voiceover ===
Brennan is a sought-after voiceover artist, who has lent her voice to numerous voiceover productions, including SheZow, Kuu Kuu Harajuku, Get Ace, Monster Beach's Television Movie, Australian-Canadian co-production Big Words, Small Stories, often voicing multiple characters in each series. She also provided the voiceover work for the Seven Network police operations series Police Strike Force.

Brennan has also voiced advertisements including BHP, Hungry Jack's, Lexus, GE Money and TAFE.

Brennan has also narrated audiobooks, including "Blood River" (2019), "Wake" and "Ripper" (2023), the latter written by Shelley Burr.

In 2018, Brennan was rewarded for her efforts with a Voice Over Award or 'VoVo' for 'Most Emotionally Powerful Delivery' for the Peter MacCallum Cancer Centre ad, "Prevent, Detect, Act".

== Personal life ==
Brennan is married to actor Ian Bliss, the two met in 1999 on the production of theatre play Silhouette. Brennan in 2021 spoke with 9Honey's 'How We Met' video series and explained in detail how she met Ian and how he would drive Jacquie to rehearsal and bring her coffee, and how the two began a close bond during that time. Brennan and Bliss married in 2001 and have two children together.

== Filmography ==
=== Film ===
Year	Title	Role	Notes	Ref
1987	Contagion	Trish	Film	
1995	Babe	Various voices	Feature film	
2008	Playing for Charlie	Vicky	Film	
2010	Animal Kingdom	Sandra Leckie	Feature film	
TBA	The Puppet Show	TBA	Short	

=== Television ===
Year	Title	Role	Notes	Ref
1986	Jackson's Crew	Gaye	TV movie	
1987	Walter Dixon's Wombat	Harriet	TV movie	
1987–1988	Wombat	Harriet	2 episodes	
1992, 1993	A Country Practice	Amanda Morton / Ms. Janice Bamford	2 episodes	
1996	After the Beep	Trish	1 episode	
1997	Murder Call	Leonie	1 episode	
1997–1998	Bullpitt!	Samantha MacDonald	26 episodes	
1998	Home and Away	Nurse June Wrench	Episode 2299	
1999	Wildside	Karen Thompson	1 episode	
2000, 2003	Stingers	Gail Lynch / Hannah Hausman	2 episodes	
2001	Sit Down, Shut Up	Helen Peters	13 episodes	
2001	BackBerner	Various characters	1 episode	
2002	All Saints	Phillipa McAlpine	1 episode	
2002	White Collar Blue	Ava Syme	1 episode	
2003	Temptation	Cathy	TV movie	
2007	Dangerous	Dean's mother	TV series, 2 episodes	
2008	Canal Road	Nina	TV series, 1 episode	
2008	Bed of Roses	Anna Mayhew	2 episodes	
2008	City Homicide	Bonnie Roper	1 episode	
2008	The Hollowmen	Mel	12 episodes	
2008–2009	Neighbours	Det. Sgt. Michaela Morris	12 episodes	
2010	Offspring	Nurse Metcalf	1 episode	
2010	Lil Larrakins	Maddie (voice)		
2010–2012	Wakkaville	Aunt Agnes (voice)	26 episodes	
2011	Winners & Losers	Gayleen Longbrook	1 episode	
2012	Dangerous Remedy	Hon	TV movie	
2012–2013	SheZow	Sheila, Tara, Grilla, Null, Madame Curiador (voice a)	26 episodes	
2013	Zuzu & the Supernuffs	Various voices	2 episodes	
2013	Upper Middle Bogan	Celia	1 episode	
2013–2021	Wentworth	Officer Linda Miles	Season 1–8 (b), 99 episodes	
2014	Monster Beach	Amphibia (voice)	TV movie	
2014	Get Ace	Mom / Reporter / Various (voices)	Animated TV series	
2015	House Husbands	Kerry the Tutor	1 episode	
2015	Exchange Student Zero	Queen Blackyard / Various	7 episodes	
2015–2018	Kuu Kuu Harajuku	Colonel Spyke / Mauve Madison / Various (voices)	156 episodes	
2016	Molly	'Dot' Canteen Lady	Miniseries, part 1	
2017	Operation Thailand	Narrator	TV documentary, 10 episodes	
2017	True Story with Hamish & Andy	Laura's Mum	Season 1, episode 9	
2018	Picnic at Hanging Rock	Mrs. McCready	Miniseries, season 1, episode 4	
2019	Secret Bridesmaids's Business	Kerri Lane	Miniseries, 4 episodes	
2019, 2023	Five Bedrooms	Denise Schaap	2 episodes	
2020	Informer 3838	Christine Hodson	Miniseries, parts 1 & 2	
2021	Big Words, Small Stories	Sally Mander / Aunt Ria / Various (voices)	65 episodes	
2022	Police Strike Force	Narrator	6 episodes	
2023	Safe Home	Nicole	1 episode	
2023	Warnie	Brigitte Warne	Miniseries, 2 episodes	
2026	Do Not Watch This Show	Robot Mate	TV series: 1 episode	
2026	Wentworth: Halfway Home	Linda Miles	TV series (TBA)	

=== Other appearances ===
Year	Title	Role	Notes	Ref
2017	Thinkergirls Pod	Self	1 episode	
2019	Wentworth: Behind the Bars	Self	TV Special	
2020	Wentworth: Behind the Bars 2	Self	TV Special	
2021	LadyParts TV	Self	1 episode	
2021	Teal Talk	Self	1 episode	
2021	Wentworth Unlocked	Self / Linda Miles	TV special	
2021-22	Hot off the Press	Self	2 episodes	
2022	Broad Radio	Self	1 episode	
2023	The Sounds of Bayside	Self	1 episode	

=== Audio books ===
Year	Title	Role	Notes	Ref
2019	Blood River	Narrator	Author: Tony Cavanaugh	
2022	Wake	Narrator	Author: Shelley Burr	
2023	Ripper	Narrator	Author: Shelley Burr	
2025	Vanish	Narrator	Author: Shelley Burr	
2026	Shot	Narrator	Author: Shelley Burr	

== Theatre ==
Year	Title	Role	Notes	Ref
1986	Room to Move	Ellie	La Boite Theatre	
1986	Camille	Understudy	Queensland Theatre Company	
1987	Away	Understudy	Cremorne Theatre, Brisbane	
1987	Merry Wives of Windsor	Ann Page	Queensland Theatre Company	
1988	Bullshot Crummond	Rosemary	TN! Theatre Company	
1988	Alligator Jones	Various characters	Polymedia	
1988	Beach Blanket Tempest	Annette	TN! Theatre Company	
	Crazies Comedy Club	Character Stand Up	Crazies Comedy Club	
1989	Popular Mechanicals	Tom Stout	TN! Theatre Company	
1989	Dinkum Assorted	Glad	Queensland Theatre Company	
	Gerry Connolly Show	Various characters	Hocking & Woods	
1990	Rosy Apples	Karen	TN! Theatre Company	
1990	Too Darn Hot	Priscilla	Tivoli Theatre, Melbourne	
1991	Who Shrunk Santa	Narrator	Also Writer/Director	
1991	Dangerous When Wet	Lolita La Touché	Sit Down Comedy Club	
	Ménage A Twah!	Singing Comedy Trio	Harold Park Hotel	
1994	Sex The Musical	Claudia	Harold Park Hotel	
1994	Milo	Peg	Sydney Theatre Company	
1995	The Harlettes	Coco	Australian tour	
1995	Big Girls Don't Cry	Coco	Also Writer	
1998	Macquarie	Narrator	Government House	
1999	Silhouette	WPC Leach	Marian St Theatre, Sydney	
2001	Are You Being Served?	Miss Brahms	Twelfth Night Theatre, Brisbane	
