= Danielle Cormack =

New Zealand actress

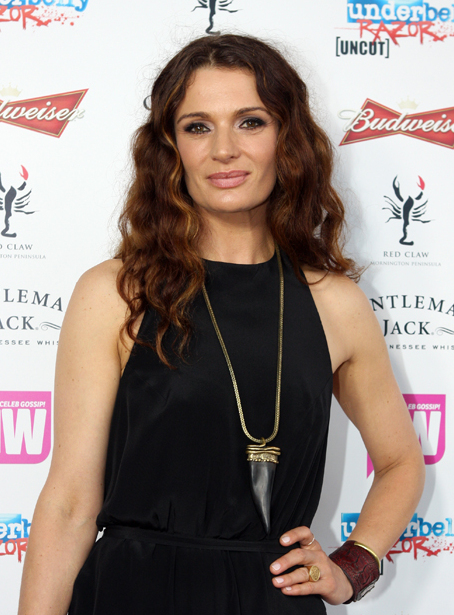
- Cormack in 2011
- Born: 26 December 1970 (age 55); Auckland, New Zealand
- Occupation: Actress/Producer/Director
- Years active: 1987–present
- Known for: Wentworth; Rake; Underbelly
- Partner: Pana Hema Taylor (2009–2013)
- Children: Two

Danielle Cormack (born 26 December 1970) is a New Zealand stage and screen actress. She was one of the original cast members of the long-running soap opera Shortland Street, though she is also known for her roles as the Amazon Ephiny in the television series Xena: Warrior Princess, Bea Smith in Wentworth, Cynthia Ross in The Cult, and Shota in Legend of the Seeker. Other works include the 2009 film, Separation City, and the Australian series Rake.

== Acting career ==
Danielle Cormack is a stage and screen actress from New Zealand. She portrayed notorious Sydney underworld figure Kate Leigh in Underbelly: Razor, and doctor Rory Finch in Jack Irish.

In 2012 Cormack was announced as Bea Smith in the Foxtel prison drama Wentworth when the series had first gone into production for four years, before leaving the show in 2016. The role of Bea Smith was originally played by Val Lehman. in Prisoner. Cormack has since appeared regularly at Wentworth-related events in the US and the UK, and hosted the 2023 New Jersey Event.

In 2022, Cormack narrated the SBS documentary series Life on the Outside, which showed what life is like for newly released prison inmates.

In 2023 she appeared in Erotic Stories on SBS Television. In the same year, she was named as part of the cast for New Zealand dramedy series Madam. Cormack was also named in the cast for Stan Australia drama Year Of.

She served as executive producer for the short film Oi (2024). On 8 December 2024, Cormack was announced in the cast for series 3 of Foxtel legal drama The Twelve.

Cormack, alongside Wentworth cast member Nicole da Silva, started the production company Four One One, and together they produced their first play Whose Afraid in 2022. Cormack and da Silva in 2023 directed the short film Why We Fight. Why We Fight was nominated for an AACTA award for Short Film.

On 17 April 2025, Cormack was named as part of the extended cast for series two of ABC series Return to Paradise. On 16 September 2025, Foxtel announced a documentary for the late Brian Walsh with Cormack announced as one of many guests.

On 17 July 2026, Cormack was named in the cast for series three of Scrublands.

== Other activities ==
In 2018, Cormack, while working alongside aid agency ChildFund, helped build a water tank that would supply villages in Uganda.

Cormack went to provide humanitarian aid to children in Ukraine after the Russian invasion of Ukraine in 2022.

As of January 2024 Cormack is an ambassador for SHINE for Kids.

== Personal life ==
Cormack was in a relationship with Pana Hema Taylor from 2009 until 2013. She has two children: one with Taylor, and one from a previous relationship.

In an interview with LOTL magazine in 2016, Cormack said that she had had long-term relationships with both men and women, and indicated that she prefers to avoid applying labels to patterns of sexuality.

Cormack is an avid motorbike fan and often goes on motorbike rides to manage stress.

== Filmography ==
=== Film ===
Year	Title	Role	Notes
1993	Snap	Felicity	Short film
1993	A Game with No Rules	Vera Smith	Short film
1994	The Last Tattoo	Molly	
1997	Topless Women Talk About Their Lives	Liz	
1998	Via Satellite	Chrissy / Carol	
1999	Siam Sunset	Grace	
1999	Channelling Baby	Bunnie	
2000	The Price of Milk	Lucinda	
2004	Without a Paddle	Toni	
2004	Stringer	Butcher	
2004	Together	Rose	Short film
2005	The Pool	Jane	Short film
2005	River Queen	Viola	
2006	Mirage	Various	Short film
2006	Cross My Heart	Krystal	Short film
2006	Perfect Creature	Margaret Sparrow	
2008	A Song of Good	Rachel Cradle	
2009	Separation City	Pam Nicholson	
2025	Backseat	Sheena	Short

=== Television ===
Year	Title	Role	Notes	Ref
1987–89	Gloss	Tania Veitch	Main role	
1992–93	Shortland Street	Alison Raynor	Main role	
1994	High Tide	Meghan Kelly	Episode: "Sitting Ducks"	
1995	High Tide	Jill McMillan	Episode: "Dead Heat"	
1995	The Call Up	Stacey	Television film	
1995	Overnight	Kelly	Television film	
1995–2001	Xena: Warrior Princess	Ephiny	Recurring role (8 episodes)	
1997	Hercules: The Legendary Journeys	Lady Marie DeValle	Episode: "Les Contemptibles"	
1997–99	Hercules: The Legendary Journeys	Ephiny	Episodes: "Prodigal Sister", "Sky High"	
2000	Jack of All Trades	Katherine	Episode: "A Horse of a Different Color"	
2000	Cleopatra 2525	Raina	Episodes: "Mind Games", "Trial and Error", "Out of Body"	
2000	Xena: Warrior Princess	Samsara	Episode: "Lifeblood"	
2004	Maiden Voyage	Lynn Fabrizio	Television film	
2006	Maddigan's Quest	Maddie	Main role (13 episodes)	
2007	Rude Awakenings	Dimity Rush	Main role (11 episodes)	
2008	City Homicide	Shirley Steadman	Episode: "Taniwha"	
2008	The Strip	Amy	Episodes: "1.11", "1.12", "1.13"	
2008–10	Legend of the Seeker	Shota	Recurring role (6 episodes)	
2009	Buzzy Bee and Friends	Elle-Gator (voice)	Recurring role (14 episodes)	
2009	The Cult	Cynthia Ross	Main role (13 episodes)	
2010	Forever New Zealand	Catherine	Television film	
2010–16	Rake	Scarlet Meagher	Main role (32 episodes)	
2011	East West 101	Angela Travis	Episodes: "Jerusalem", "Behold a Pale Horse", "Revelation"	
2011	Underbelly: Razor	Kate Leigh	Main role (13 episodes)	
2012	Miss Fisher's Murder Mysteries	Anna Ross	Episode: "Queen of the Flowers"	
2012	Buzzy Bee and Friends	Elle-Gator (voice)	Episodes: "2.1", "Memories", "Oscar's Ups and Downs"	
2013–16	Wentworth	Bea Smith	Main role (46 episodes)	
2016	Deep Water	Brenda MacIntosh	4 part miniseries on SBS	
2016	Stake Out	Davina	"Hijacking Hijinks"	
2018	Patricia Moore	Marnie	9 episodes	
2018	Jack Irish	Rory Finch	5 episodes	
2018	Secret City	Karen Koutoufides	Main role	
2019	Fresh Eggs	Lulu	TV series	
2019	My Life Is Murder	Nikki Malone / Nicole Buttera	TV series, episode: "The Locked Room"	
2022	The Secrets She Keeps	Vicky Michaelson	Season 2 (6 episodes)	
2023	Year Of	Lucinda Prichard	9 episodes	
2023	Erotic Stories	Ginger	1 episode (The Deluge)	
2024	Madam	Deziyah	TV series: 8 episodes	
2024	Double Parked	Edie	TV series 1 episode	
2025	The Last Anniversary	Kate Kennedy	TV series: 1 episode	
2025	The Twelve	Gabe Nicholls	TV series; 8 episodes (season 3: Cape Rock Killer)	
2025	Return to Paradise	Asher Svensson	TV series: 1 episode (Apex Predator)	
2026	Situationship	Mary Jane	TV series	
2026	Dead Bones		TV series	
TBA	Scrublands: Trust	TBA	TV series	

=== Other appearances ===
Year	Title	Role	Notes	Ref
2025	The Great Entertainer	Self	Documentary	
2025	Memory Bites with Matt Moran	Guest	1 episode	
2022	Life on the Outside	Self/Narrator	Documentary 3 episodes	
2019	Wentworth: Behind the Bars	Self	TV Special	
2017	Cram	Self	1 episode	
2016	An Audience With the Cast of Wentworth	Self	TV Special	

== Theatre ==
Year	Title	Role	Notes	Ref
1993	East	Sylv	Mercury Theatre, Auckland	
1994	East	Sylv	Zurich Arts Festival – Lucerne, Switzerland	
1996	Spare Prick	Lucinda	Basement Theatre, Auckland	
1996	Return of the Summer Street Seven	Lucinda	Basement Theatre, Auckland	
1997	Arcadia	Chloe Coverly	Auckland Theatre Company	
1999	Trainspotting	Various	New Zealand Tour	
2001	The Blue Room	Alison / Various	Auckland Theatre Company	
2001	A Streetcar Named Desire	Stella	Auckland Theatre Company	
2002	The Bellbird	Flo	Auckland Theatre Company	
2003	The Shape of Things	Evelyn	Auckland Theatre Company	
2003	The Vagina Monologues	Various	New Zealand Tour	
2004	Skin Tight	Elizabeth	New Zealand Tour	
2004	Caligula	Caesonia	Auckland Theatre Company	
2004	Sex with Strangers	Robyn	Herald Theatre, Auckland	
2005	Sex with Strangers	Prostitute	Herald Theatre, Auckland	
2005	A Clockwork Orange	Various	Silo Theatre, Auckland	
2006	The Case of Katherine Mansfield	Katherine Mansfield	Herald Theatre, Auckland	
2007	The Case of Katherine Mansfield	Katherine Mansfield	Downstage Theatre, Wellington	
2008	The Hypocrite	Dorine	Melbourne Theatre Company	
2008	Rock 'n' Roll	Lenka	Melbourne Theatre Company & Sydney Theatre Company	
2010	Christ Almighty	Three Wise Men	The Basement Theatre, Auckland	
2011	Yellow Moon	Hollie	B Sharp	
2012	Top Girls	Marlene	Silo Theatre	
2014	Rupert	Anna Murdoch	Theatre Royal, Sydney	
2015	Boys Will Be Boys	Astrid Wentworth	Sydney Theatre Company	
2016	Straight	Steph	Kings Cross Theatre	
2018	The Misanthrope	Alceste	Bell Shakespeare, with Griffin Theatre	
2018	Hedda	Hedda	Queensland Theatre Company	
2020	Every Brilliant Thing	(Director)	Silo Theatre, Auckland	
2022	Whose Afraid	Cast	Belvoir St	
2023	Blessed Union	Cast	Belvoir St	
2026	W	Sue	Old Fitz Theatre	
2027	Every Second Wednesday	Sue	Melbourne Theatre Co	

== Awards ==
Year	Award	Category	Production	Result
1997	New Zealand Film and TV Awards	Best Actress	Topless Women Talk About Their Lives	Won
1999	New Zealand Film and TV Awards	Best Actress	Channelling Baby	Nominated
2000	New Zealand Film and TV Awards	Best Actress	The Price of Milk	Nominated
2000	Fantasporto International Film Festival	Best Actress	Siam Sunset	Won
2005	Drifting Cloud International Film Festival	Best Performance	Together	Won
2006	TV Guide Best on the Box People's Choice Awards	Best Actress	Maddigan's Quest	Nominated
2006	48 Hour Film Festival	Best Manic Performance	Mirage	Won
2006	Richmond Road Short Film Festival	Best Performance Female	Together	Won
2009	Aotearoa Film & Television Awards	Best Lead Actress in a Feature Film	Separation City	Nominated
2010	Qantas Television Awards	Best Performance by Actress in General Television	The Cult	Won
2011	Equity Awards	Best Ensemble Cast	Rake	Won
2012	Logie Award	Most Popular Actress	Underbelly: Razor & East West 101	Nominated
2014	Logie Award	Outstanding Actress	Wentworth	Nominated
2014	Logie Awards	Most Outstanding Drama Series	Wentworth	Nominated
2014	Logie Awards	Most Outstanding Actress	Wentworth	Nominated
2015	ASTRA Award	Most Outstanding Female Actor	Wentworth	Won
2015	AACTA Award	Best Lead Actress in a Drama	Wentworth	Nominated
2015	Logie Award	Most Outstanding Actress	Wentworth	Won
2015	Logie Award	Most Outstanding Drama Series	Wentworth	Won
2016	AACTA Award	Best Actress in a Drama	Wentworth	Nominated
2016	Logie Award	Most Outstanding Drama Series	Wentworth	Nominated
2017	Logie Award	Most Outstanding Actress	Wentworth	Nominated
2017	Logie Award	Most Outstanding Drama Series	Wentworth	Nominated
