= Showdown =

A showdown is a confrontation between two opponents leading to a definitive resolution. The term may also refer to:

== Places ==
- Showdown Ski Area, in Montana, United States

== Books ==
- Showdown (Amado novel), a 1984 novel by Jorge Amado
- Showdown (Dekker novel), a 2006 novel by Ted Dekker
- Showdown (Flynn novel), a 1946 novel by Errol Flynn
- Showdown: The Inside Story of How Obama Fought Back Against Boehner, Cantor, and the Tea Party, a 2012 book by David Corn
- The Showdown, a novel in the Left Behind: The Kids series

== Film and TV ==
=== Film ===
- Showdown (1942 film), a Superman animated short
- Showdown (1963 film), an American western starring Audie Murphy
- Showdown (1973 film), an American western starring Dean Martin
- Showdown (1993 film), a film starring Billy Blanks
- Showdown, a 2000 film directed by Izu Ojukwu
- The Showdown (1928 film), a film starring Evelyn Brent
- The Showdown (1940 film), a Hopalong Cassidy film
- The Showdown (1950 film), a film starring Marie Windsor
- The Showdown (2011 film), a South Korean film starring Park Hie-soon

=== Television ===
- Showdown (Canadian game show), a 1961-1962 Canadian program
- Showdown (U.S. game show), a 1966 program made by Heatter-Quigley Productions
- Showdown: Air Combat, a program on the Military Channel
- "Showdown" (Cheers)
- "Showdown" (How I Met Your Mother)
- "Showdown" (The Adventures of Batman & Robin)
- "The Showdown" (The O.C.)
- "Showdown" (Wentworth)
- Showcase Showdown, the semifinal round of The Price Is Right
- "The Showdown" (Animator vs. Animation)

== Games and sports ==
- Showdown (AFL), a derby match in the Australian Football League
- Showdown (game), a word and trivia game
- Showdown (NTN/Buzztime Game), an online trivia game
- Showdown (poker), the final round in a poker match
- Showdown (sport), a sport for players who are blind or have a vision impairment
- Showdown, briefly-used basketball name for the NBA Finals in the 1980s
- Showdown: Legends of Wrestling, a 2004 video game

== Music ==
- The Showdown (band), an American heavy metal band

=== Albums ===
- Showdown (Electric Light Orchestra album) or the title song (see below), 1974
- Showdown (The Isley Brothers album) or the title song, 1978
- Showdown (Rise of the Northstar album) or the title song, 2023
- Showdown!, by Albert Collins, Robert Cray, and Johnny Copeland, 1985
- Showdown, by Gallagher and Lyle, 1978
- Showdown: Reloaded, by Al Kapone and Mr. Sche, 2008
- The Showdown (album), by Allen-Lande, or the title song, 2010

=== Songs ===
- "Showdown" (Electric Light Orchestra song), 1973
- "Showdown" (Pendulum song), 2009
- "Showdown", by Billy Ocean from Love Zone, 1986
- "Showdown", by Black Eyed Peas from The E.N.D., 2009
- "Showdown", by Boy Kill Boy from Civilian, 2006
- "Showdown", by Britney Spears from In the Zone, 2003
- "Showdown", by Carol Lloyd from Score, 1979
- "Showdown", by Cheri Dennis from In and Out of Love, 2007
- "Showdown", by Crucial Conflict from The Final Tic, 1996
- "Showdown", by E-A-Ski, 1997
- "Showdown", by the Sugarhill Gang with Grandmaster Flash and the Furious Five from 8th Wonder, 1981
- "Showdown", by Thin Lizzy from Nightlife, 1974
- "The Showdown", by Jesper Kyd from the Tumbbad film soundtrack, 2018

== Other ==
- Showdown cooperative learning, an educational technique

== See also ==
- The Big Showdown, a 1974-1975 TV program made by Don Lipp Productions and Ron Greenberg Productions
- Show up (disambiguation)
