= Wentworth season 5 =

Wentworth
- Season 5
- Region 4 DVD Cover
- Starring: Nicole da Silva; Sigrid Thornton; Celia Ireland; Shareena Clanton; Katrina Milosevic; Robbie Magasiva; Socratis Otto; Tammy Macintosh; Kate Jenkinson; Bernard Curry; Kate Atkinson; Pamela Rabe
- No. of episodes: 12

Release
- Original network: Showcase
- Original release: 4 April – 20 June 2017

Season chronology
- ← Previous; Season 4 Next → Season 6

The fifth season of the television drama series Wentworth premiered on Showcase in Australia on 4 April 2017, having previously aired on SoHo, and concluded on 20 June 2017. It was executive produced by FremantleMedia's Director of Drama, Jo Porter. The season comprised 12 episodes. The fifth season picks up just days after the death of Bea Smith and is therefore noted as the first season not to feature Danielle Cormack.

== Plot ==
Following Bea Smith's tragic death at the hands of Joan Ferguson, emotional, psychological and professional shockwaves pound the inmates and staff of Wentworth Correctional Centre. Governor Vera Bennett is under fire from Corrective Services and, with Will on suspension, she is relying more on her deputy Jake, not realising he is now Ferguson's puppet. New top dog Kaz has a challenge to restore order amongst the traumatised inmates, though Sonia remains aloof focusing on her upcoming trial. Liz has to decide if she follows her heart or her head. Doreen struggles with being separated from her son and Boomer supports Maxine as she continues her battle with breast cancer. On the outside, it falls to Franky to break the devastating news about Bea to Allie.

== Cast ==
=== Regular ===
- Nicole da Silva as Franky Doyle
- Sigrid Thornton as Sonia Stevens
- Celia Ireland as Liz Birdsworth
- Shareena Clanton as Doreen Anderson
- Katrina Milosevic as Sue "Boomer" Jenkins
- Robbie Magasiva as Deputy Governor Will Jackson
- Socratis Otto as Maxine Conway
- Tammy Macintosh as Kaz Proctor
- Kate Jenkinson as Allie Novak
- Bernard Curry as Jake Stewart
- Kate Atkinson as Governor Vera Bennett
- Pamela Rabe as Joan Ferguson

=== Recurring ===
- Libby Tanner as Bridget Westfall
- Jacquie Brennan as Linda Miles
- Martin Sacks as Derek Channing
- Steve Bastoni as Don Kaplan
- Hunter Page-Lochard as Shayne Butler
- Sally-Anne Upton as Lucy "Juice" Gambaro
- Charli Tjoe as Tina Mercado
- Ra Chapman as Kim Chang
- Daniielle Alexis as Dana Malouf
- Zahra Newman as Iman Farah
- Richard Sutherland as Alan Doyle
- Bessie Holland as Stella Radic
- Sophia Katos as Mel Barratt
- Maddy Jevic as Nurse Lee Radcliffe

== Episodes ==
No. overall	No. in season	Title	Directed by	Written by	Original release date	Aus. viewers
47	1	"Scars"	Mat King	John Ridley	4 April 2017	101,000
Both staff and inmates at Wentworth are dealing with the aftermath of Bea's tragic death. Allie returns from the hospital while Ferguson is back in general population. Hounded by inmates wanting her blood, Ferguson takes advantage of their hatred by subduing her assailants during an exercise period and creating an aura of fear around herself. Kaz declares that all violence against other women in Wentworth is banned. Sonia prepares for her trial, confident that she will be acquitted. Vera is faced with the problem of finding a scapegoat, firing Brenda Murphy for Bea's escape even though she let her out. Boomer is distraught when Maxine announces that she is being transferred to Barnhurst, and Franky finds her freedom in peril as Mike Pennisi, the man she assaulted, comes back into her life.
48	2	"The Bitch is Back"	Mat King	Andrew Anastasios	11 April 2017	96,000
Franky returns to Wentworth after facing charges for the murder of Mike Pennisi when her DNA is matched to the murder weapon, the gun she took from Shayne outside the court during Ferguson's trial. She deduces that somehow Ferguson is behind it all. Bridget is devastated to see Franky back in Wentworth, while Maxine says her goodbyes to the women before being transferred for good. Vera takes steps to discredit Ferguson's case. Liz begins to doubt her decision to testify against Sonia when Doreen learns about it.
49	3	"Nothing But the Truth"	Geoff Bennett	Pete McTighe	18 April 2017	88,000
Franky enlists Shayne's help to prove her innocence and tries to place distance between herself and Bridget. Facing accusations of being a weak leader, Kaz takes decisive action to stop the drug trade inside Wentworth and Ferguson senses an opportunity to gain power. Liz takes the stand at Sonia's trial but things go horribly wrong when the defence council produces new evidence. As Sonia walks free from the court, Liz is returned to Wentworth, realising that she is in a worse position than she was before.
50	4	"Loose Ends"	Geoff Bennett	Marcia Gardner	25 April 2017	85,000
Doreen applies for a transfer to Western Australia to be closer to her family, while Liz tries to contact Detective Kaplan. Franky and Allie grow closer, as Ferguson proposes to take control of the drug trade inside Wentworth. Sonia is revealed to have been sleeping with and conspiring with Kaplan all along. She enjoys the high life as the scale of her crimes becomes apparent, but finds that her freedom is short-lived. Sonia tries to kill Kaplan but he escapes but not before releasing incriminating information about her role in her late husband’s death.
51	5	"Belly of the Beast"	Fiona Banks	Marcia Gardner	2 May 2017	79,000
Allie tries to come to terms with her grief regarding Bea's death. Doreen has her transfer hearing with the board, but is denied. Sonia resists Juice's standover tactics but is badly beaten up. As the drug trade intensifies, Kaz accuses Will of supplying drugs to the women as their mutual hatred comes to a head. Franky sabotages a prison van as part of her escape plan, an action which places Kaz and Will in danger, but enables them to forge a new understanding.
52	6	"Happy Birthday, Vera"	Fiona Banks	John Ridley	9 May 2017	80,000
Jake and Ferguson conspire to ensure Vera has a memorable birthday. Ferguson instructs Jake to make Vera emotionally dependent on him. Jake and the staff serve Vera a birthday cake but she reacts negatively due to her abusive mother. Meanwhile, while Sonia and Boomer join forces in a new work project which involves erecting hanging plant pots. New prisoner Iman seeks help from Doreen, and is harassed by Juice. Juice visits the dentist but Ferguson exacts a brutal revenge on her by cutting out her tongue, causing the other prisoners to hail her the new top dog. An overwhelmed Vera turns to Jake for comfort and the two move in together.
53	7	"The Pact"	Mat King	Andrew Anastasios	16 May 2017	83,000
Ferguson officially takes over as top dog as the prisoners are afraid of her. Franky has restarted assessing legal cases; Vera asks her to take down Ferguson, which she declines. Kaz shares with Will her suspicion that a prison guard is involved in the drug trade within the prison. Allie stockpiles on drugs intending to hotshot Ferguson, Franky finds out and disapproves. Allie's plan fails; Ferguson overpowers her yet spares her life. Sonia seeks to expand the gardening venture and wants Liz involved. Franky plans to escape, and makes a pact with Allie to do so together. Doreen is approved for parole; she celebrates with the women and is released.
54	8	"Think Inside the Box"	Mat King	Pete McTighe	23 May 2017	73,000
Channing's inspection of the workshop project ends in disaster. He shuts its down but Allie convinces him to reconsider his decision by threatening to expose his role in running brothels. Franky and Allie plot to escape and Will and Kaz join forces to stop the drug trade. Bridget cannot cope with the strain of separation and breaks Franky's heart.
55	9	"Snakehead"	Catherine Millar	Andrew Anastasios	30 May 2017	74,000
Vera refuses to believe Will's accusations against Jake. Tensions escalate when Will convinces Vera to launch a drug search of the staff. However, Jake narrowly succeeds in framing Will, who reveals that he is in a romantic relationship with Vera. Franky's attempts to help Iman leads her to discover that Iman knew Mike Pennisi.
56	10	"Mere Anarchy"	Catherine Miller	Marcia Gardner	6 June 2017	81,000
Boomer asks Franky not to sabotage the work project with her escape. Vera discovers Jake’s underworld connections when his drug boss visits their home. Channing discovers Jake’s drug dealings but makes a deal with him to keep a cut of the profits. Franky discovers that Iman murdered Mike Pennisi due to his infatuation with Franky. Iman attacks Franky but Ferguson kills Iman and frames Franky for the murder. Channing takes advantage of the drugs and Iman’s death to sideline Vera, causing Jake to question his alliance with Ferguson.
57	11	"Coup de Grâce"	Kevin Carlin	John Ridley	13 June 2017	81,000
Vera discovers Jake’s drug involvement and collusion with Ferguson, prompting Jake to blackmail her by threatening to reveal her own wrongdoings. A guilt-ridden Jake breaks with Ferguson. After learning of Detective Kaplan’s true nature, Liz admits she is Witness X with Sonia vowing vengeance. Kaz and Franky stage a kangaroo trial for Ferguson but things rapidly spiral out of control when some of the inmates try to lynch her. Against Acting Governor Channing’s orders, Vera saves Ferguson.
58	12	"Hell Bent"	Kevin Carlin	Pete McTighe	20 June 2017	119,000
Franky and Allie proceed with their plan to escape Wentworth which involves sneaking out in flower bed boxes. Allie is captured by Jake but manages to work out a deal with him to eliminate Ferguson. Will confronts Jake over the murder of Nils Jesper. Liz poisons Sonia in an attempt to protect herself. Jake arranges for Joan to "escape" in a flower bed box, but she is taken to a secluded location and buried alive. The person burying her is revealed to be Will Jackson, falsifying Joan’s accusations of him being incapable of serving justice .

== Production ==
On 21 July 2016, it was announced that FremantleMedia had renewed Wentworth for a fifth season, set to air in 2017.

Jo Porter, the Director of Drama at FremantleMedia stated, "As season four comes to a close, the audience has witnessed a dangerous shift in the power base at Wentworth which is building to an unmissable conclusion next week. Wentworth has built a reputation for delivering a world with unexpected twists and turns where no character is safe. The season’s end provides a chilling platform for our script producer Marcia Gardner and the writing team to shape the next chapter for our regular characters, along with some new faces in the yard and on the outside. With series producer Pino Amenta at the helm, our ambition to keep lifting the bar and reward our audience both locally and internationally couldn’t be stronger."

Penny Win, the Head of Drama at Foxtel stated, "Wentworth has gone from strength to strength over the past four seasons. Not only is it an international television success story, now showing in 141 territories, it is a ratings blockbuster and fan favourite for Foxtel audiences. We are extremely proud of this long-running drama juggernaut. It was a very easy decision to commission a further season of this brilliantly constructed and crafted program from our production partner FremantleMedia. There is a lot in store both for the women behind bars and those on the outside."

== Reception ==
=== Ratings ===
No.	Title	Air date	Overnight ratings		Ref(s)
No.	Title	Air date	Viewers	Rank	Ref(s)
1	"Scars"	4 April 2017	101,000	1	
2	"The Bitch is Back"	11 April 2017	96,000	1	
3	"Nothing But the Truth"	18 April 2017	88,000	2	
4	"Loose Ends"	25 April 2017	85,000	9	
5	"Belly of the Beast"	2 May 2017	79,000	2	
6	"Happy Birthday, Vera"	9 May 2017	80,000	1	
7	"The Pact"	16 May 2017	83,000	1	
8	"Think Inside the Box"	23 May 2017	73,000	2	
9	"Snakehead"	30 May 2017	74,000	2	
10	"Mere Anarchy"	6 June 2017	81,000	2	
11	"Coup de Grace"	13 June 2017	81,000	2	
12	"Hell Bent"	20 June 2017	119,000	1	

=== Accolades ===
AACTA Awards

- Nominated: Best Television Drama Series — Wentworth
- Nominated: Best Lead Actress in a Television Drama — Pamela Rabe
- Won: Subscription Television Award for Best New Talent — Zarah Newman

Australian Directors Guild

- Won: Best Direction in a TV or SVOD Drama Series — Fiona Banks (for "Belly of the Beast")

Logie Awards

- Nominated: Most Outstanding Actress — Kate Atkinson
- Won: Most Outstanding Actress — Pamela Rabe
- Won: Logie Award for Most Outstanding Drama Series — Wentworth
- Nominated: Most Outstanding Supporting Actress — Celia Ireland
- Won: Most Popular Drama Program — Wentworth

== Home media ==
Title	Release	Country	DVD	Blu-ray	Region	Ref(s)
Wentworth: The Complete Season 5	4 October 2017	Australia	Yes	Yes	4/B	
Wentworth Prison: Season Five	9 October 2017	UK	Yes	No	2	
Additional
Distributor: Roadshow Entertainment (Australia); Network (United Kingdom); Set details: 12 episodes; 568 minutes; 1.78:1 aspect ratio; DVD Audio: English: Dolby Digital 5.1 (regions 2 & 4); Blu-ray Audio: English: DTS-Master Audio 2.0 (Region B Australia); Subtitles: English SDH (DVD & Blu-ray Australia); Discs: 4-DVD set (region 2 UK); 4-DVD set (Region 4); 3-Blu-ray set (Region B Australia); Rating: ACB: MA15+; BBFC: 18
