= List of Wentworth characters =

The following is a list of characters from the Australian television series Wentworth.

== Main characters ==
Actor	Character	Season							
Actor	Character	1	2	3	4	5	6	7	8
Danielle Cormack	Bea Smith	Main	Main	Main	Main				
Nicole da Silva	Franky Doyle	Main	Main	Main	Main	Main	Main	Special guest	
Kris McQuade	Jacs Holt	Main							
Leeanna Walsman	Erica Davidson	Main							
Kate Atkinson	Vera Bennett	Main	Main	Main	Main	Main	Main	Main	Main
Celia Ireland	Liz Birdsworth	Main	Main	Main	Main	Main	Main	Main	
Shareena Clanton	Doreen Anderson	Main	Main	Main	Main	Main			
Aaron Jeffery	Matthew Fletcher	Main	Main	Main					
Robbie Magasiva	Will Jackson	Main	Main	Main	Main	Main	Main	Main	Main
Catherine McClements	Meg Jackson	Main							
Katrina Milosevic	Sue Jenkins	Recurring	Main	Main	Main	Main	Main	Main	Main
Pamela Rabe	Joan Ferguson		Main	Main	Main	Main	Special guest	Special guest	Main
Socratis Otto	Maxine Conway		Recurring	Recurring	Main	Main			
Tammy MacIntosh	Kaz Proctor			Guest	Main	Main	Main	Main	
Kate Jenkinson	Allie Novak				Main	Main	Main	Main	Main
Sigrid Thornton	Sonia Stevens				Special guest	Main	Main		
Bernard Curry	Jake Stewart				Recurring	Main	Main	Main	Main
Leah Purcell	Rita Connors						Main	Main	Main
Susie Porter	Marie Winter						Main	Main	Main
Rarriwuy Hick	Ruby Mitchell						Main	Main	Main
Kate Box	Lou Kelly								Main
Zoe Terakes	Rebecca 'Reb' Keane								Main
Jane Hall	Ann Reynolds								Main
Vivienne Awosoga	Judy Bryant								Main

=== Bea Smith ===
Bea Smith (Danielle Cormack) (seasons 1–4) came to be an inmate after attempting to murder her husband, Harry, after she had endured years of domestic violence. After entering the facility, she is coveted by both Franky Doyle and Jacs Holt in their fight for "Top Dog" of the prison. Bea struggles adjusting to her new life in prison as well as trying to keep up with her daughter, Debbie, and her husband while they are in the outside world. After Bea's daughter is murdered on the order of Jacs Holt, Bea kills her by jabbing a pen into her neck and is charged with manslaughter. After believing that Debbie committed suicide, it is later revealed to Bea that Debbie was murdered by Brayden Holt, Jacs' son. Hellbent on revenge, Bea concocts a plan to escape Wentworth and kill Brayden for killing Debbie. After a bloody fight with Franky, Bea slices her own wrists, as sliced wrists cannot be cuffed, and is transferred to the hospital, where she escapes after being treated. Bea finds Brayden and holds him hostage in his mechanic shop, where she gets him to confess to killing Debbie, after which she kills him. Bea is charged with murder and returns to Wentworth as the new "Top Dog". She maintains a tough anti-drug trafficking policy with inmates. During a fire started by Ferguson, after killing Jess, Bea saves Doreen's baby and Franky. Bea is serving life without parole. Loneliness, the loss of Debbie and the stress of being "Top Dog" take their toll on Bea over time. Season four widely focuses on Bea discovering a side of herself she never believed to be there after falling in love with new inmate Allie Novak. In the finale of season 4, Bea believes Allie to be dead after she was given a hotshot (a lethal amount of illicit drugs) by Joan Ferguson. As Joan is walking out of the prison following her release, Bea confronts her with a screwdriver. After a struggle ensues between the two, Joan gains control of the screwdriver and Bea impales herself onto it 8 times, followed by a further 5 stab wounds from Joan herself, which cause Bea's death and ensure that Joan cannot be released from Wentworth and will be forced to remain in custody until her trial.

=== Franky Doyle ===
Francesca "Franky" Doyle (Nicole da Silva) (seasons 1–7) is an inmate at Wentworth Correctional Centre. Franky was sent to Wentworth after she was charged with assault for throwing boiling oil on a television presenter of a cooking show that she was participating in for criticizing her food. Franky is a lesbian who has had relationships with some of the inmates and staff at Wentworth. Franky has been paroled and is in a relationship with forensic psychologist Bridget Westfall.

=== Vera Bennett ===
Vera Bennett (Kate Atkinson) (seasons 1–8) is the Director at Wentworth Correctional Centre. Vera is shown as a timid individual who has difficulty forming friendships and relationships due to having to take care of her mother. Rather than confiding in her colleagues about her mother, Vera lies about having a boyfriend named Adam. Vera forms a relationship with her co-worker, Matthew "Fletch" Fletcher; however, their relationship ends after Vera reads Fletch's journal. In season 2, Vera becomes the Director of Joan Ferguson, where she changes her personality into one that is much stronger and not so much of a shy pushover. In the season 4 premiere, Vera is appointed the new Director of Wentworth after Joan is charged with the murder of former inmate Jess Warner and is remanded in custody awaiting sentencing.

=== Doreen Anderson ===
Doreen Anderson (Shareena Clanton) (seasons 1–5) is an inmate at Wentworth Correctional Centre. Doreen was charged with reckless endangerment for losing her unborn baby after having a car accident due to heavy drinking and drug use.

During season two, Doreen gets pregnant by Nash, an inmate from Walford, during the construction of the greenhouse.

=== Liz Birdsworth ===
Elizabeth "Liz" Birdsworth (Celia Ireland) (seasons 1–7) is an inmate at Wentworth Correctional Centre. Liz is a recovering alcoholic who was first sent to Wentworth for the manslaughter of her mother-in-law. While under the influence of alcohol, Liz drove a tractor over a party setup for her mother-in-law's birthday after stressing that it was not going to be good enough. To avoid running over her daughter, Liz turned the tractor, but accidentally ran over and killed her mother-in-law. Liz was the peer worker of the prison, dealing with inmates and the staff if there was an issue. However, Liz lost the right to be a peer worker after she relapsed into her alcoholism. Since then, Liz has been on and off with her addiction. Eventually, Liz makes parole and tries to start her life anew once on the outside. Liz tries to reconnect with her children but is too scared to do so. Liz later returns to Wentworth after having broken the conditions of her parole.

=== Fletch ===
Matthew "Fletch" Fletcher (Aaron Jeffery) (seasons 1–3) is a correctional officer at Wentworth. Fletcher is shown to have previously been a soldier who served in various war zones, including East Timor. His experience with a young girl being shot leaves him with PTSD and nightmares, and he is shown to easily lose his temper under stress. He attempts to have a relationship with fellow corrections officer Vera Bennett, but it ends after she reads a journal filled with expressions of rage as part of his therapy. He has a contentious relationship with Officer Will Jackson, and it is later revealed that he had a brief affair with Will's wife Meg Jackson; she became pregnant with his child and had an abortion just weeks before her death in the prison. This leads to the two having a brawl in the boiler room during a prison riot. He is also shown as being transphobic towards Maxine when she arrives at Wentworth.

He has doubts and reservations about Governor Ferguson and suspects her abuse, but is initially unable to prove it. During Ferguson's attempt to remove drugs from the prison, Franky implicates Fletch as a potential source for smuggling, causing him to fight with Franky in her cell. At the end of season 2, during Bea's plan to escape and take revenge on Brayden Holt, Jess seduces Fletch in the shower, enabling Bea to steal his access card and gather supplies. A distraught Fletch takes his concerns to Channing after Ferguson attempts to transfer him out, but the investigation is shut down when Ferguson uncovers evidence of Channing's prostitution ring and blackmails him. After encountering an inmate who was previously tortured by Ferguson at Blackmoor Prison, he learns of her involvement with an inmate named Jianna and her vendetta against Will Jackson. He plans to report it to the board; however, en route to Will's house, he is struck by a speeding van driven by Ferguson's accomplice and nearly killed.

During season 3, Fletcher spends his time recovering from his attack, which leaves him both physically injured and with severe mental damage and amnesia. Will visits to finally put their past behind them. Vera also comes to visit him during his rehab, which is later discovered by Ferguson. After a severe bout of depression and alcoholism, Vera gives him advice that helps him start to get back on track, and Ferguson and Channing offer him his job back in an attempt to discover what he still remembers. Seeing Bea's drawing of Ferguson's henchman triggers his memory, and he finally pieces together what happened to him. He allies himself with Bea and Vera to finally take Ferguson down by using their knowledge of her past against her.

=== Will Jackson ===
Will Jackson (Robbie Magasiva) (seasons 1–8) is a correctional officer at Wentworth. Will is a former social worker who transferred to corrections. Will was married to the previous Governor, Meg Jackson. After Meg was killed during a riot at the prison, Will spiralled into a depression that he tried to cure with alcohol and drugs. At one point, Will overdosed, but Fletch managed to save him. Will had numerous high-profile storylines; in series 7, he was promoted to acting Governor, and later, to Governor. Following the siege, Will leaves Marie in protection and tries to get along with the new General Manager Ann Reynolds, who wants him gone. Will survives the prison explosion, making it out with Linda, and confirms the death of Ann Reynolds to Vera.

=== Jacs Holt ===
Jacqueline "Jacs" Holt (Kris McQuade) (season 1) was an inmate at Wentworth. Jacs was serving fourteen years for the manslaughter of an associate of her husband, Vinnie Holt. Jacs was in a competition for "Top Dog" with Franky Doyle, often insulting Franky's sexuality and ordering hits to try and take her out of the running. Jacs attempts to befriend Bea Smith when she was new to the prison, often alluding to how horrible it would be if something were to happen to Bea's daughter, Debbie, if Bea did not cooperate with Jacs' wishes. After Bea sided with Franky, Jacs orders her son, Brayden, to kill Debbie by heroin overdose. Jacs is confronted by Bea after she hears the news about Debbie's death, and Bea stabs a pen into Jacs' neck, killing her.

=== Boomer ===
Sue "Boomer" Jenkins (Katrina Milosevic) (seasons 1–8) is an inmate at Wentworth who is serving time for grievous bodily harm and drug trafficking. Boomer is best friends with Franky Doyle and serves as her muscle. Boomer is often portrayed as a slow and sometimes mentally challenged individual, but it is revealed that she has Fetal Alcohol Spectrum Disorder as a result of her mother ingesting alcohol while she was pregnant with Boomer. Her disability is the reason that she struggles with many cognitive issues. After the siege, Boomer becomes Allie's second hand as Top Dog and manages to become pregnant. She survives the prison explosion.

=== Erica Davidson ===
Erica Davidson (Leeanna Walsman) (season 1) became the governor of Wentworth after Meg Jackson's death. Before becoming governor, Erica was a prisoner advocate and an acquaintance of Franky Doyle. Although engaged, Erica explores her feelings for Franky, often hinting that she is bisexual, though she always denies it.

=== Meg Jackson ===
Meg Jackson (Catherine McClements) (season 1) was the Governor of Wentworth Correctional Centre. Meg was married to Will Jackson, an officer at Wentworth. She also had an affair with Fletcher, which led to an abortion two weeks before the riot. Meg died during a riot at the prison after being stabbed in the chest with a shiv. It is later revealed that Meg was killed by Franky Doyle accidentally.

=== Joan Ferguson ===
Joan Ferguson (Pamela Rabe) (seasons 2–8) became the governor of Wentworth after Erica Davidson left. Before being the governor, Ferguson was a correctional officer at Blackmoor Prison, where she shared a special bond with an inmate named Jianna, who was pregnant. She becomes a prisoner in season 4. She appears as hallucinations in season 6. She appeared briefly in the season 7 finale, where it was teased that she would return for season 8. Joan survives the prison explosion after saving Vera and goes on the run.

=== Karen Proctor ===
Karen "Kaz" Proctor (Tammy MacIntosh) (seasons 3–7) is an inmate at Wentworth and the leader of the Red Right Hand. She also acts as a maternal figure for Allie, which adds to the tension between her and Bea.

In episode 4 of season 7, Kaz is murdered by an unknown assailant. It is later revealed that corrupt prison officer Sean Brody killed Kaz to silence her, as she knew about Marie's escape plan.

=== Allie Novak ===
Allie Novak (Kate Jenkinson) (seasons 4–8) is an inmate at Wentworth and a member of the Red Right Hand. She was a prostitute and drug addict until she met Kaz, who got her out of that life. She is loyal to Kaz but later falls in love with Bea, becoming devastated at her death and wanting revenge on Ferguson. In season 6, she forms a relationship with Ruby Mitchell, but also begins to doubt Kaz after her former lover, Marie Winter, is arrested and incarcerated at Wentworth. Allie, after the siege of Wentworth, becomes Top Dog but stands down after she is injured in a shiv attack. Allie survives the prison explosion.

=== Bridget Westfall ===
Bridget Westfall (Libby Tanner) (seasons 3–6) is a forensic psychologist who works with the inmates at Wentworth. Bridget identifies as a lesbian and has feelings for Franky Doyle, which Franky reciprocates. Bridget's feelings for Franky develop far enough that Bridget decides to quit because of the suspicion from other prisoners and staff. When Franky gets out of prison, she goes to live with Bridget.

=== Maxine Conway ===
Maxine Conway (Socratis Otto) (seasons 2–5) is a transgender inmate at Wentworth. Maxine was sent to Wentworth after stabbing her boyfriend, Gary, with scissors after he cut off her hair as a result of Maxine's gender reassignment surgery. Maxine is seen as the muscle in the prison, often affiliated with Bea Smith as her second in command. Upon Maxine's entry into Wentworth, she was taunted with transphobic insults and bets as to whether she had a penis or a vagina. After Maxine's adjustment to prison life, her boyfriend's brother comes to visit her and leaves her men's clothing and a visitor's pass, which Maxine uses to try to escape the prison. Vera, upon finishing her shift, noticed that Maxine was trying to escape and called out to Will to stop Maxine from leaving. After being taken back into the prison, Vera refuses to give Maxine her wig back. In season 4, Maxine is diagnosed with breast cancer. In season 5, after having a double mastectomy, Maxine is transferred to Barnhurst prison, as they have a better treatment facility to help with her chemotherapy.

=== Jake Stewart ===
Jake Stewart (Bernard Curry) (seasons 4–8) is a senior officer who served as a guard at Walford Prison before being transferred to Wentworth. Stewart shared a sexual relationship with guard Sean Brody. Stewart serves as acting Deputy Governor when Will is suspended for drugs, and is the father of Vera's baby, Grace. Jake survives the prison explosion.

=== Sonia Stevens ===
Sonia Stevens (Sigrid Thornton) (seasons 4–6) made her first appearance during the fourth series episode "Divide and Conquer", broadcast on 14 June 2016. Thornton appeared in the original Prisoner television series as Roslyn Coulson, making her the second actress to star in both Prisoner and Wentworth. The character was partly inspired by Prisoner's Sonia Stevens, who was played by Tina Bursill. Thornton's Sonia is "a wealthy but self-made dynamo behind a cosmetics empire." She is accused of murdering a missing woman and sent to Wentworth prison on remand. Sonia was killed by Kaz Proctor, pushing her off the roof.

=== Rita Connors ===
Rita Connors (Leah Purcell) (seasons 6–8) is an inmate at Wentworth, and the older sister of Ruby Mitchell. She is a member of a biker gang. It is later revealed that Connors is not actually her last name, and she is an undercover cop. Rita is betrayed by her former police handlers, and after the siege, she goes into police protection. On the hunt for answers, she rescues Ruby but kills Morelli in the process and goes on the run to be with her dying father. Rita is taken back to Wentworth, where she is revealed to be a cop. Rita survives the prison explosion.

=== Ruby Mitchell ===
Ruby Mitchell (Rarriwuy Hick) (seasons 6–8) is an inmate at Wentworth and the younger sister of Rita Connors. She was a prodigy, but suffered brain damage following a car accident Rita was involved in. She is a boxer and is revealed to have accidentally killed the son of Marie Winter. She is one of five inmates transferred to H block at the beginning of season 6. She later forms a relationship with Allie Novak. A sheet of paper on her cell door in season 7 spells her name "Roobi". Ruby later goes for a day out on day release, where she is kidnapped by Rita's old handlers. Rita saves her, and she returns to Wentworth, where Ruby tells the girls "she got drunk" and "missed curfew". Ruby survives the prison explosion.

=== Marie Winter ===
Marie Winter (Susie Porter) (seasons 6–8) is an inmate at Wentworth, a businesswoman, and the co-owner of a brothel along with Derek Channing. She once had a relationship with Allie Novak, which led Allie to drugs and prostitution until Kaz stopped it. She had an affair with Will Jackson and was arrested for assaulting a doctor who was unable to save her son. In season 7, she is elected Top Dog following the death of Kaz Proctor. Marie, after the siege, is languishing in protection and attempts suicide; she is released into Lou's unit. After crossing Lou while saving Ruby, Marie is stabbed in the chest by Lou and dies alone.

=== Lou Kelly ===
Lou Kelly (Kate Box) (season 8) is a new inmate at Wentworth who has been there before. She is in a relationship with Reb Keane, a transgender man who has not yet had his gender reassignment surgery. She was at Wentworth before, as Top Dog, and her trademark justice was to amputate fingers with a cigar cutter. She is told to take charge of the protection of prisoners after their unit is shut down. After Allie is stabbed and put in a wheelchair, she takes the role of Top Dog. After Reb is killed, her motivation is to take revenge on those she holds responsible. Lou, with nothing left to lose, asks Judy to help her bomb her way out of Wentworth with maximum casualties. Lou survives the prison explosion and is arrested shortly after.

=== Reb Keane ===
Reb Keane (Zoe Terakes) (season 8) is Lou Kelly's boyfriend. As he is a transgender man who has not yet had his gender reassignment surgery, he is arrested with her and placed in the same unit. He is scared of prison, and Marie tries to protect him, seeing him as a surrogate son. After Sheila arrives and meets him and Lou, he becomes upset, and she eventually drugs him and garottes him in his sleep to get revenge on Lou.

=== Judy Bryant ===
Judy Bryant (Vivienne Awosoga) (season 8) is a hacker who is suspected of terrorism and is despised by Ann Reynolds, the new general manager, for this, as her daughter died in a terrorist attack. She befriends Allie, Ruby and Boomer, but is only out for herself, also assaulting Ann and stealing Lou and Reb's money to stall her extradition, and eventually stabs Allie and turns her into a paraplegic because she found out she stole Reb's money. When her treachery is discovered, they report her to Lou, who nearly kills her before she offers an escape involving a bomb. Lou agrees, but only wants revenge on the officers. Ann, knowing the authorities are tracking the movements of her accomplices on the outside and that Judy was involved with those who killed her daughter, has Judy moved to an area near the site where the bomb will go off to prevent her escape, and Judy is killed in the explosion.

=== Ann Reynolds ===
Ann Reynolds (Jane Hall) is the new general manager of Wentworth following Derek Channing's dismissal and arrest. She attempts to save money by shutting down the protection unit, enlisting Lou Kelly to take care of the prisoners there, and manipulates Vera into supporting her by revealing her daughter was killed in a terrorist attack. She dislikes Will and despises Judy. She also hooks up with Jake a couple of times. She is made aware of Lou and Judy's bomb threat and is persuaded to let it continue until the authorities find evidence of Judy's involvement. On the day the bomb goes off, she arranges for Judy to be moved to an area near the site where the bomb will go off. After the explosion, Vera finds her destroying evidence of her arranging Judy's death, and she attempts to kill Vera, but they are found by Joan, who kills her and carries Vera out.

== Recurring characters ==
=== Inmates ===
==== Kim Chang ====
Kim Chang (Ra Chapman) (seasons 1–5) is an inmate at Wentworth. Kim was Franky's friend with benefits inside the prison. Kim was often seen as Franky's weakness when she was Top Dog, which other inmates would try to exploit. Kim makes parole and leaves on bad terms with Franky, as Kim goes back to her boyfriend once outside. Kim later breaks the conditions of her parole and is sent back to Wentworth. Kim reveals that she did it on purpose to be with Franky because she loves her, but is angered when Franky has moved on. Later on, she becomes a drug user and joins the Asian crew as Tina's drug mule.

==== Toni Goodes ====
Toni Goodes (Jada Alberts) (seasons 1-2) is a drug-addicted inmate at Wentworth, and the mother of Kaiya, who Doreen cares for. After Toni is put in solitary again for using drugs, Doreen sends Kaiya to live with her grandmother. After she is released from solitary, Jacs forces her to claim Franky gave her the drugs, and she is put into protection until her release. In season 2, she has gotten clean, and visits Doreen to give her a pregnancy test, later sending Liz a package which Bea picks up.

==== Ronnie Katsis ====
Ronnie Katsis (Louise Harris) (season 1) is an inmate returning to Wentworth when Bea Smith is arrested. She blows a guard in exchange for cigarettes, and is a member of Jacs' crew. Later she uses her daughter to smuggle drugs, but this fails when she passes out, and she is discovered and shunned by the inmates. Due to this she is moved into protection and never seen again.

==== Philipa Turner ====
Philipa "Pip" Turner (Rondah Dam) (season 1) was one of Jacs' henchmen in the first season.

==== Simmo ====
Simone "Simmo" Slater (Ally Fowler) (seasons 1–3) was an inmate at Wentworth. Simmo was one of Jacs Holt's henchmen, and had connections with Jacs' family and business on the outside world. Simmo was a recovering heroin addict, until her husband ordered her to kill Bea Smith at the request of Vinnie Holt to avenge the murder of his wife, Jacs. Simmo refuses to kill Bea and goes to Franky for drugs, with which she intended to use to kill herself but Bea Smith discovered her in time. After Simmo recovers, she again refuses to kill Bea. Later, Bea discovers Simmo in her room after dying of a heroin overdose. It is later discovered that Governor Ferguson gave Simmo a hot shot of Pink Dragon heroin.

==== Roz Jago ====
Rosalind "Roz" Jago (Benne Harrison) (seasons 1–2) was one of Jacs' henchmen, and later Simmo's friend and muscle source. After being framed for painting graffiti mocking Ferguson, she and the other members of Jacs' gang, except Simmo, are transferred to another block.

==== Megan Summers ====
Megan "Meg" Summers (Melitta St Just) (seasons 1-2) was one of Jacs' henchmen, and later Simmo's friend and muscle source. After Roz Jago, another member of Jacs' crew, is framed for painting graffiti mocking Ferguson, she and the other members of Jacs' gang, except Simmo, are transferred to another block.

==== Sky Pierson ====
Sky Pierson (Kathryn Beck) (season 2) is an inmate at Wentworth. Sky is heavily addicted to heroin and one of Franky's henchmen. Sky is shown constantly trying to score heroin and even threatens to cut it out of the stomach of a new inmate after she was arrested for drug trafficking. Sky only appears in the second season, her fate is currently unknown.

==== Jess Warner ====
Jess Warner (Georgia Chara) (seasons 2–3) was an inmate at Wentworth. Jess was serving a five-year sentence for the murder of a baby.

==== Kat ====
Kat (Elissa Stephens) (season 2) is an inmate who arrived at Wentworth at the same time as Maxine Conway and Jess Warner. She had a cast on her leg and was arrested for trying to rob a convenience store. Later she is revealed to be a hitman sent to kill Bea by Vinnie Holt, and to be hiding a knife in her cast. She attacks Bea but is stopped by Maxine, and moved into protection with attempted murder added to her record.

==== Sophie Donaldson ====
Sophie Donaldson (Edwina Samuels) (seasons 2–3) is an inmate at Wentworth and Liz Birdsworth's daughter. Sophie was sent to prison for driving under the influence of alcohol on a suspended license and hit a cyclist. She bonds with Franky, but takes a while to reconnect with Liz. In season 4 she is mentioned to have been transferred to Barnhurst.

==== Kelly Bryant ====
Kelly Bryant (Christen O'Leary) (seasons 2–3) was a prisoner at Blackmoor, the prison Ferguson was a guard at before Wentworth. She is transferred to Wentworth in late season 2, but after Ferguson finds out she is there, she has her transferred to Barnhurst, though Fletch manages to interrogate her about Ferguson's past.

==== Jianna Riley ====
Jianna Riley (Tasia Zalar) (seasons 2-3) was a prisoner at Blackmoor, who had a relationship with Joan Ferguson, and was pregnant. Will Jackson, at that point a social worker, took the baby away from her after it was born. Jianna was later found in her cell hanged. Ferguson believes she hanged herself due to losing the baby, and blames Will, but Will later reveals the other prisoners lynched her for her relationship with Ferguson.

==== Su-Yun Lee ====
Su-Yun Lee (Hany Lee) (season 2) is a new prisoner arrested for drug trafficking. She does not speak English. When Liz uses Kim to translate for her, they find she swallowed two heroin packets, which she has kept down too long to vomit up. They try to help her, but she eventually dies when the packets break inside her.

==== Sarah Briggs ====
Sarah Briggs (Katherine Halliday) (season 2) is a kitchen worker at Wentworth, and a member of Franky's drug crew.

==== Lindsay Coulter ====
Lindsay Coulter (Kasia Kaczmarek) (seasons 2–3) is a kitchen worker at Wentworth, and a member of Franky's drug crew. Kasia Kaczmarek is the daughter of Marta Kaczmarek, another actress on the show.

==== Marge Novak ====
Marge Novak (Marta Kaczmarek) (seasons 2, 5) is a long-serving inmate at Wentworth. Bea finds out she takes medication to thicken her blood, which she uses as part of her plan to kill Brayden Holt. Later, she dies of a heart attack while looking at the green wall. Despite sharing a surname with Allie Novak, no familial relationship is specified or implied. Marta Kaczmarek is the mother of Kasia Kaczmarek, another actress on the show.

==== Jodie Spiteri ====
Jodie Spiteri (Pia Miranda) (season 3) is a kitchen worker at Wentworth, and a member of Franky's drug crew. After Bea finds out about Franky's drugs, she frames Jodie for possession. Ferguson tortures her into stabbing Bea, and when Bea and Franky try to get her to retaliate, Ferguson stops them and manipulates Jodie into self-harming even more, causing her to be moved to the psychiatric ward.

==== Lucy Gambaro ====
Lucy "Juice" Gambaro (Sally-Anne Upton) (seasons 3–6) is an inmate at Wentworth. She and her crew are often predatory towards new or young prisoners and are known to gang-rape victims. "Juice" has Hepatitis-C and pricks Vera with an infected needle while holding her hostage. In season 5, she has her tongue cut out by Joan Ferguson. She returns in season 6, as a member of Vicky Kosta's gang.

==== Latham ====
Latham (Sarah Howett) (seasons 1-7) is an inmate at Wentworth. She is seen in the background throughout the show. In season 1, she helps Franky get revenge on Jacs. In season 3, she is one of Lucy Gambaro's henchwomen, along with Stella Radic. In season 5, she helps hold Linda Miles hostage in Ferguson's "kangaroo court". In season 6, she is part of Vicky Kosta's fight club, where she fights and loses to Ruby. In season 7, she is one of Kaz' supporters in dealing with the drug problem. Interestingly, in "Coup De Grace", Vera calls her Latham, but in season 6, her supporters in the fight club call her Greenslade.

==== Tina Mercado ====
Tina Mercado (Charlie Tjoe) (seasons 3–5) Tina is the leader of one of Wentworth's drug trafficking groups. She and her followers don't follow Bea's rules, which often results in Tina getting bashed by Maxine. In season 6, she is mentioned to have given an alibi for the murder Franky is accused of, exonerating Franky.

==== Cindy Lou ====
Cindy Lou (Miles Paras) (season 3) Cindy Lou is a non-English speaking member of Tina Mercado's gang. She at first appears to be the leader, having Tina translate for her to avoid suspicion. She is also a drug user. After the group intimidates Franky, she gets help from Lucy Gambaro and her gang and outs Tina as the leader. She later dies from an overdose of drugs brought in by Kim Chang after she returns to Wentworth.

==== Mel Barrett ====
Mel Barrett (Sophia Katos) (seasons 4–5) is a member of the Red Right Hand. She appears to be Kaz's right-hand woman. During the election for Top Dog she, Liz and Sonia count the votes.

==== Carly ====
Carly (Carly Baker) (seasons 4-8) is a member of the Red Right Hand. She is often shown supporting Kaz, and later Allie.

==== Soz ====
Soz (Leonie Bolton) (seasons 4-8) is a member of the Red Right Hand. She is often shown supporting Kaz, and later Allie.

==== Tasha Goodwin ====
Tasha Goodwin (Frankie Adams) (season 4) is a new, young inmate at Wentworth. She is arrested for stealing from a convenience store and assaulting the owner. After Joan directs Lucy Gambaro to rape her, she pushes the panic button and gets Lucy thrown into solitary. Maxine refuses to punish her for this, and Bea is forced to brand her as a lagger to prevent Lucy and her gang from inflicting a worse punishment. Due to being ostracized for this, she attempts suicide, but is saved by Joan and moved into the psych ward.

==== Stella Radic ====
Stella Radic (Bessie Holland) (season 2–6) is Lucy Gambaro's right hand. The most notable member of "the boys" gang. Bleached blonde hair that is always styled differently. In season 6 she and Lucy have joined Vicky Kosta's gang.

==== Dana Malouf ====
Dana Malouf (Daniielle Alexis) (season 5) was a featured extra in the Red Right Hand gang.

==== Iman Farah ====
Iman Farah (Zahra Newman) (season 5) is a new inmate in season 5, arrested for assault. She is nearly assaulted by Lucy Gambaro, but saved by Franky. She finds out Franky is a paralegal, and asks for her help in appealing her conviction. It is later revealed that she was in a relationship with Mike Pennisi, and killed him because he was obsessed with Franky, but framed her for this believing she was the true reason for his death, and got herself arrested to get to Franky. After admitting this to Franky, she is killed by Ferguson, who frames Franky for her murder.

==== Hutch ====
Jen "Hutch" Hutchins (Sarah Hallam) (seasons 5–7) is an inmate with long blonde hair. She defends Ferguson in "Coup De Grace", insisting "it was self defense Franky" when Franky accuses Joan of murder. In season 6 she has become a member of Vicky Kosta's gang, and records the fights on a phone. In season 7 she appears to be Vicky Kosta's right-hand woman.

==== Mon Alston ====
Mon Alston (Emily Havea) (seasons 6–8) is a member of the Red Right Hand. She appears to be Kaz's right-hand woman following Mel Barrett's disappearance. In "Ascension" she accuses Marie of having killed Kaz, and attempts to murder her, before being stopped by Allie. Alston is sent back to the slot after she attacks Marie when she comes out of the protection unit following the closure.

==== Vicky Kosta ====
Victoria "Vicky" Kosta (Artemis Ioannides) (seasons 6–7) is a gang leader in Wentworth. In season 6, she, along with Ruby, Cherry Li, Spike Baxter and Sharon Gilmour are transferred from another block to H block. In addition to being the main drug dealer following Tina Mercado's disappearance, she also organizes a fight club in which inmates fight and place bets. Her gang in season 6 includes Hutch, Cherry Li, Lucy Gambaro and Stella Radic. In season 7 she attempts to become Top Dog after Kaz's death, but is framed for her murder by Marie, though later cleared. In the finale, she is among those taken hostage, and is shot and killed by Sean Brody.

==== Drago ====
Zara "Drago" Dragovich (Natalia Novikova) (season 6) is Marie Winter's business associate and right-hand woman. After Rita gives information on a deal Marie is doing, she and others are arrested for sex trafficking. She distrusts Rita, despite Marie's skepticism, and tries to prove her a rat. Eventually she finds out that Ruby killed Marie's son, and tries to kill her in the fight club, where Rita kills her to protect Ruby.

==== Cherry Li ====
Cherry Li (Sun Park) (season 6) is a member of Vicky Kosta's gang. She and Kosta, along with Ruby, Spike Baxter and Sharon Gilmour are transferred to H block at the beginning of season 6. She once worked as a prostitute at a brothel owned by Marie, which she was fired from after being scarred. She tries to kill Marie for this after her arrest, only to be stopped by Rita. Later she defeats Boomer in the fight club. After Drago suspects Rita of being the rat, the police plant evidence suggesting Cherry is the rat, and Drago attacks her, turning her into a quadriplegic. Boomer is initially blamed for this due to the fight club, but Rita later tells the police the truth.

==== Spike Baxter ====
Spike Baxter (Kate Elliot) (season 6) is a violent inmate originally from J block, who is in a relationship with Sharon Gilmour. She and her girlfriend, along with Ruby, Kosta and Cherry Li, are transferred to H block at the beginning of season 6. She is possessive of her girlfriend. After Sonia kills Sharon, mistaking her for Liz, she frames Spike by planting the murder weapon in her cell. Liz later tells Spike what Sonia did. After Spike is released from solitary, she attacks Sonia, but is stopped and transferred back to J block.

==== Sharon Gilmour ====
Sharon Gilmour (Catherine Larcey) (season 6) is Spike Baxter's girlfriend. She and Spike, along with Ruby, Kosta and Cherry Li, are transferred to H block at the beginning of season 6. Spike is possessive of her. Sonia later kills her, mistaking her for Liz, and frames Spike. Liz tells Spike, and later tricks Sonia into confessing to the murder while being recorded.

==== Taylah Bullock ====
Taylah Bullock (Marny Kennedy) (season 6) is a young inmate used by Marie to bring heroin into the prison. Kaz stops her and gets her sent to the infirmary, later intimidating her into revealing where the rest of it is.

==== May Jenkins ====
May Jenkins (Anni Finsterer) (season 7) is Boomer's abusive mother. She is an alcoholic. She sponsors Boomer for her day release, but later gets them both arrested for shoplifting. She is remanded to Wentworth, where she continues to bully her daughter. Liz eventually helps Boomer stand up to her. In the finale, after Boomer attempts to end the siege by taking Marie hostage, Brody kills May as punishment.

==== Routh ====
Routh (Cindy Rella) (seasons 3-7) is an inmate often seen in the background. She helps Latham hold Linda Miles hostage during Ferguson's kangaroo court in "Coup De Grace". Her name is revealed when she is offered a fight in Vicky Kosta's fight club in season 6.

==== Kylee Webb ====
Kylee Webb (Geraldine Hakewill) (season 7) is a new, drug-addicted inmate at Wentworth. When her drugs are confiscated and destroyed by Kaz, she goes into withdrawal and eventually attacks Vera, but is calmed down by Dr. Miller and later transferred to the psych ward.

==== Narelle Stang ====
Narelle Stang (Morgana O'Reilly) (season 7) is the sister of a man who was assaulted by the Red Right Hand, leaving him mentally handicapped. He was assaulted for something he didn't do. Narelle is arrested for assault, and finds out that Kaz is in Wentworth as well. She also knows Rita under the name "Rita Harris", and knows she is an undercover cop. She blackmails Rita to kill Kaz with this information, but Ruby eventually stops this by confessing to Narelle's crime.

==== Sheila Bausch ====
Sheila Bausch (Marta Dusseldorp) (season 8) is a new inmate who knows Lou and Reb from the same clinic Reb was sent to. She is charged with murder. It is later revealed that she was convinced by the doctor that her "urges" were wrong, and loved him for it, and that Lou committed the murders she is accused of. To get revenge, she uses drugs from Marie to incapacitate Lou and Reb, and garottes Reb while they sleep together, taking away the person Lou loved most. When Lou finds out, she forces Sheila to drink strychnine. When Marie finds them, Sheila is not dead yet due to the dose being too low, and Marie persuades Lou to help mercy kill her.

==== Eve Wilder ====
Eve Wilder (Tina Bursill) (season 8) is a new inmate, a former nanny who knows Ferguson due to having been incarcerated at Blackmoor while she worked there. After she finds out Joan is faking her amnesia, they bond over their beliefs and past crimes as Joan tries to manipulate her to kill Jake. After she realizes this, she attempts to kill Joan, who fights back and removes her eye. Having emotionally unraveled, Eve is sent to a mental institution.

==== Cynthia Rattray ====
Cynthia Rattray (Alexandra Schepisi) (season 8) is an inmate in the protection unit. She joins Lou's crew after Ann Reynolds shuts down the unit. She later attacks Reb, but is injured by Marie when she defends him. Reb eventually tells the truth about Rattray's injuries, and Rattray is transferred to another block. After she is moved to general population, Boomer makes a comment suggesting Rattray is a child predator, implying this is why she was in protection.

==== Zaina Saad ====
Zaina Saad (Louisa Mignone) (season 8) is an inmate who has access to a cell phone, which Lou eventually takes to use for herself. She also enters a relationship with Ruby while trying to help Boomer.

==== Mandy Frost ====
Mandy Frost (Jenny Vuletic) (season 8) is a long-serving inmate who has been at Wentworth since Lou was in the first time. She joins Lou's crew after she and Reb return to Wentworth, and serves as her right-hand woman. She is often called "Mullet". She later takes the blame for a murder committed by Lou. She is killed in the explosion in the finale.

==== Zheng ====
Zheng (Fanny Hanusin) (season 8) is a kitchen worker at Wentworth. She takes Joan under her wing, claiming she is "good with a knife" and later assigns her to show Eve how to fold towels.

=== Staff ===
==== Linda Miles ====
Linda Miles (Jacquie Brennan) (seasons 1–8) is an officer at Wentworth. Miles has a gambling problem and is corruptible. Linda is nicknamed "Smiles" for her cold demeanor, Linda does favours for prisoners and during season 7 is promoted to acting deputy governor as Will is promoted to acting governor as Vera steps back from her duties. Linda racks up debt of $20,000 and is taken hostage during the Wentworth Siege. In series 8 Linda suffers from PTSD after the siege and it goes unchecked until she threatens to sue the department for her PTSD, Linda survives the prison explosion.

==== Derek Channing ====
Derek Channing (Martin Sacks) (seasons 1–6) is the former regional director for Wentworth. He is a member of the board of directors who regularly checks in on the facility, Channing ends up arrested for the murder of Brenda Murphy and cops the blame for the attempted murder of Joan Ferguson.

==== Greg Miller ====
Greg Miller (David de Lautour) (seasons 7-8) is the new psychologist at Wentworth following Bridget Westfall resigning. He helps the inmates with their psychological issues. He befriends Vera, and Jake becomes jealous, believing they have feelings for each other, but eventually realizes they are just friends. He prescribes Liz psuldrycin to help with her dementia, but is forced to take her off it after he fails to document that it caused occasional freak outs, though continues to prescribe it illicitly. In season 8 he diagnoses Joan as actually suffering amnesia, only for her to confess she was playing him, forcing him to go along with the ruse. Miller is later fired from Wentworth after Joan reveals in court she regained her memory.

==== Rose Atkins ====
Rose Atkins (Maggie Naouri) (seasons 2–3) is a nurse who works in the medical centre at Wentworth. Has a relationship with Will Jackson. Disappears after season 3, for unknown reasons.

==== Lee Radcliffe ====
Nurse Lee Radcliffe (Maddy Jevic) (seasons 4–6) is another nurse. Her nickname is "Nurse Ratshit". She appears after Rose Atkins leaves. She isn't sympathetic toward the prisoners unlike her predecessor. She has a brief relationship with Jake Stewart, which information is later used to blackmail her. Vera discovers this in Season 6, and later fires her for this. She uses the excuse that some drugs were missing and she couldn't account for them. These drugs were discreetly given to Jake because he had "trouble sleeping". Jake lied to her, the drugs were actually for Will due to his guilt over having buried Ferguson alive.

==== Shen ====
Nurse Shen (Chloe Ng) (seasons 6-8) is another nurse. After Nurse Radcliffe is fired, she is the nurse for the remainder of the series.

==== Brenda Murphy ====
Brenda Murphy (Katerina Kotsonis) (seasons 5-6) is a former guard at Wentworth. She is a smoker. After Ferguson kills Bea outside the prison, Vera frames Murphy for neglecting her duty and allowing it to happen, and forces her to resign. Jake later tracks her down, now working security at a supermarket, and learns the truth may be in the backup files, which he uses to protect himself against Vera. When Vera, Will and Jake are blackmailed over Ferguson's escape, it is revealed Murphy is the blackmailer, and has photos of them at the grave site. They agree to pay her, but when she comes to collect from Vera she is shot and killed by Derek Channing. In season 8, it is revealed that she helped Ferguson escape after Will buried her alive.

==== Sean Brody ====
Sean Brody (Rick Donald) (season 7) was a former officer of Walford Prison who shared a sexual relationship with guard Jake Stewart. Brody comes to Wentworth and when he does he brings trouble with him. He manages to manipulate everyone, he puts Linda into debt, lets Kosta take the fall for Kaz's death and gets Jake suspended. Brody takes the prison hostage in order to get Marie Winter out but his plan fails and he is shot and killed by Allie Novak.

==== Anna Deng ====
Anna Deng (Cecilia Low) (seasons 6-8) was a guard at Wentworth. She is taken prisoner during the siege at the end of season 7. She is one of the casualties in the explosion at the end of season 8.

==== Chris Bakula ====
Chris Bakula (Scott Parmeter) (seasons 1-3) was a former guard at Wentworth. He is immediately shown to be corrupt when he gives cigarettes to returning inmate Ronnie Katsis in exchange for a blowjob. He later gives Will illicit access to camera footage in an attempt to find Meg's killer. In the season 3 finale he is killed by Jess Warner after she seduces him to kidnap Joshua.

==== Green ====
Officer Green (Lee Beckhurst) (season 8) is a new guard at Wentworth. He is corrupt, and Linda offers him extra money to perform an illegal strip search on Boomer to find the camera, though Boomer stops him. He later gives Lou illicit information, including that her phone privileges were suspended after Will spoke to Rita.

==== Steven Phelps ====
Steven Phelps (Lawrence Mooney) (season 1) is a teacher of one of the programs at Wentworth. After Toni Goodes is caught with drugs, he admits to Erica he gave them to her. Erica promises she will suppress Toni if she rats him out, but demands he resign, which he does.

=== Other characters ===
==== Alan Doyle ====
Alan Doyle (Richard Sutherland) (seasons 1, 4-6) is Franky Doyle's father, who works as a plumber. He abandoned her and her mother when she was a child, leading to her having anger issues. In his first appearance he visits her in prison, regretful of his past actions, to try to reconcile with her, but she refuses, though he claims he will not give up. After her release, he visits her again, revealing that he has another daughter, and asking Franky to meet her. Franky is reluctant, but does so, and they come to have a good relationship. After Franky is arrested again, he visits her, and she asks him to help her by smuggling a walkie talkie into the prison for her escape plan, which he does. After Franky is released, she and Bridget meet him and her half-sister at a park.

==== Tess Doyle ====
Tess Doyle (Milla Cormack) (seasons 4-6) is Franky Doyle's half-sister, in kindergarten. After their father informs Franky of her existence, they meet, and she comes to look up to Franky. After Franky is arrested and sent back to Wentworth, pictures of her are taken and sent to Franky to intimidate her into not implicating Ferguson for Iman Farah's murder. After Franky's charges are dropped, she meets Tess and their father at a park.

==== Vinnie Holt ====
Vinnie Holt (John Bach) (season 1) is Jacs Holt's husband and Brayden Holt's father. Before her death he asks Jacs for a divorce shortly before her death in order to marry one of his mistresses. He later orders a "hit" on Bea Smith, which isn't seen through. It is later discovered that he has died of a heart attack after his son's funeral.

==== Rita Bennett ====
Rita Bennett (Lynette Curran) (seasons 1–2) is Vera Bennett's mother, who is later killed by Vera via morphine overdose.

==== Kaiya ====
Kaiya Goodes (Tanika Fry) (season 1) is Toni's daughter, who lives in the prison with her, though Doreen takes care of her to the point where others see her as her real mother. After Bea loses track of her in a riot and Toni is put in solitary for using drugs, Doreen sends Kaiya out of Wentworth to live with her grandmother. Later, after Toni's release, she tells Doreen during a visit that she is able to visit Kaiya.

==== Debbie Smith ====
Debbie Smith (Georgia Flood) (seasons 1–2, 4) is Bea Smith's daughter. She is killed by Brayden Holt via drug overdose.

==== Brayden Holt ====
Brayden Holt (Reef Ireland) (seasons 1–2) the son of Jacs and Vinnie Holt. He murdered Debbie Smith under the orders of his mother. Brayden is later killed by Bea (who escaped from the hospital after a fight with Franky Doyle to do so), via a gun shot to the head.

==== Harry Smith ====
Harry Smith (Jake Ryan) (season 1–3) is Bea's ex-husband and father of Debbie Smith. Will Jackson was accused of his murder, but it was revealed later that he was killed by one of Ferguson's accomplices.

==== Artie Donaldson ====
Artie Donaldson (Louis Corbett) (season 7) is Liz's son, and Sophie's brother. He became sick after drinking some of Liz's alcohol as a boy. When Liz suffers from dementia, she contacts him, hoping to reconnect before it becomes too late. He visits, and eventually does manage to come to terms with her. Afterward, she tells him not to come back, as she has dementia, and wants him to remember her the way she is.

==== Oliver Donaldson ====
Oliver Donaldson (Andrew Blackman) (season 1) is Liz's ex-husband and Sophie and Artie's father. He divorces Liz after she is arrested for accidentally killing his mother Celeste, and later marries another woman.

==== Celeste Donaldson ====
Celeste Donaldson (Anne Charleston) (season 1) is Liz's mother-in-law, who she accidentally killed by running over with a tractor after drinking alcohol having struggled to plan her birthday party. Charleston appeared in the original Prisoner television series as Lorraine Watkins and Diedre Kean.

==== Mike Pennisi ====
Mike Pennisi (Paul McDermott, Felix Williamson) (seasons 1, 5) is a former chef who was severely burned by Franky after insulting her food, which sent her to Wentworth. After her release, he meets her, and after one chat where she tells him about her kite necklace, begins stalking her. Eventually he is murdered, and she is arrested for it. Franky initially suspects Ferguson, but realizes later it wasn't, eventually discovering the real killer was new inmate Iman Farah, who was his girlfriend.

==== Mark Pearson ====
Mark Pearson (Damon Gameau) (season 1) is Erica Davidson's fiance.

==== Manda Katsis ====
Manda Katsis (Carla Bonner) (season 1) is Ronnie Katsis' sister, who takes care of her daughter Amy while Ronnie is in prison. She is in on the plan to use Amy to smuggle heroin.

==== Amy Katsis ====
Amy Katsis (Virginia Cashmere) (season 1) is Ronnie Katsis' daughter, who she uses to smuggle heroin into the prison. She collapses after being unable to excrete the heroin, and is caught, causing Ronnie to be harassed by the other prisoners and placed in protection.

==== Craig Norton ====
Craig Norton (Hugh Sexton) (season 1) is a drug dealer used by Franky to smuggle drugs into Wentworth. Franky has him visit Bea and kiss her to put heroin in her mouth, but she is caught, though refuses to implicate him or Franky.

==== Malcolm Spitz ====
Malcolm Spitz (John Brumpton) (season 2) is Simmo Slater's husband and their daughter's father, who works as the driver for Vinnie Holt. He informs her that the Holts want her to kill Bea after she attacks Brayden, and that they have threatened to kill him if she doesn't. He is also the father of their daughter, Carly.

==== Carly Slater ====
Carly Slater (Nicole Gulasekharam) (season 2) is Simmo and Malcolm's daughter, who occasionally comes to see her mother. Bea uses the idea of Brayden getting close to her to make Simmo paranoid. Later, when Bea escapes, she finds Brayden and Carly about to do drugs together.

==== Kay Donaldson ====
Kay Donaldson (Davini Malcolm) (season 2) is Oliver's new wife, and Artie and Sophie's stepmother. After Liz appears at the house to give them letters while on parole, she tells Liz it may be weird to encounter them after so long.

==== Trina Jenkins ====
Trina Jenkins (Maria Angelico) (season 2) is Boomer's sister, who visits her and reveals she and Boomer's ex-boyfriend Daz are now together.

==== Rachel Sanger ====
Rachel Sanger (Annie Jones) (season 2) is a parole officer who has an affair with Derek Channing, which Ferguson uses to blackmail her into giving her information, allowing her to discover Channing's ownership of illegal brothels.

==== Graham Dalby ====
Graham Dalby (Tony Rickards) (season 2) is a lawyer who represents Franky after she stabs Bates. He later visits Bea to inform her of her options, but she only requested he visit so she could be in the visitor center at the same time as Brayden Holt.

==== Steve Faulkner ====
Steve Faulkner (Tony Briggs) (season 2) is a guard at Walford. He brings the male inmates involved in the garden project to Wentworth and helps supervise the work.

==== Colin Bates ====
Colin Bates (Steve Le Marquand) (season 2) ruthless rapist serving time in Walford Prison, who ends up being stabbed in the crotch by Franky after he refused to honour their drug deal.

==== Nash Taylor ====
Nash Taylor (Luke McKenzie) (seasons 2–5) is a former inmate at Walford Prison and the father of Doreen Anderson's baby. He also has another daughter with a former girlfriend.

==== Ivan Ferguson ====
Ivan Ferguson (Alex Manglet, Jarrah Cocks) (seasons 2-3, 8) is Joan Ferguson's father, ex-military and a fencing master. He appears training Joan while she is the governor of Wentworth, but is later revealed to be a hallucination. In season 8 it is revealed he murdered Joan's mother. Alex Manglet appeared in the original Prisoner television series as Ray Proctor.

==== Nils Jesper ====
Nils Jesper (Tony Nikolakopoulos) (seasons 2-4) is a former convicted felon who later works as Ferguson's hitman. He is used by Ferguson to gain information and to assault people who attempt to cause problems for her. Eventually she has him run over Fletch, but this doesn't kill him. Later he attacks Bea, and his DNA is left under her fingernails, which Bea gives to Kaz to identify him. When Ferguson orders him to kill Fletch, he is surprised and defeated, and arrested, also revealed as the one who killed Harry Smith. He agrees to testify that Ferguson ordered him to do it, but on the way to the courthouse his transport is hijacked by Jake, who kills him.

==== Martin Tucker ====
Martin Tucker (Syd Brisbane) (seasons 2, 4) is Maxine's ex-boyfriend's brother, who has feelings for Maxine. He helps her try to escape prison, and later delivers her sperm in an attempt to help her have a baby with Boomer.

==== Detective Michael Mears ====
Detective Michael Mears (Damien Richardson) (season 3) is a detective investigating Will Jackson for the murder of Harry Smith.

==== Lily Anderson ====
Lily Anderson (Maurial Spearim) (season 3) is Doreen's sister, who Doreen asks to take care of Josh while she is in prison. She comes to pick up Josh, but Doreen is unable to give him up.

==== Daz ====
Darren (Tom Budge) (season 4) often called Daz, is Boomer's ex-boyfriend, now dating her sister, he comes to see her in conjugal after she tempts him, but after he realizes she is trying to get pregnant, he leaves.

==== Jim Proctor ====
Jim Proctor (Kevin Kiernan-Molloy) (season 4) is Kaz Proctor's father, who abused her when she was a child. He later dies from his smoking habit.

==== Faith Proctor ====
Faith Proctor (Debra Lawrence, Rebecca Bower) (season 4) is Kaz Proctor's mother, who visits her in prison to inform her of her father's death, but doesn't believe he was abusive to her.

==== Miranda ====
Miranda (Janine Atwill) (season 4) is Nash's ex-girlfriend, and mother of his first child. She allows him to move in with her after he is released from prison, and helps him care for Josh after Doreen gives him custody. After a paranoid Doreen nearly gets him beaten by the Red Right Hand, she kicks him out, forcing him to find other accommodations too far away to bring Josh for regular visits.

==== Gary Tucker ====
Gary Tucker (Simon Maiden) (season 4) is Maxine's ex-boyfriend, who she stabbed with a pair of scissors after he cut her hair in her sleep. He preferred her as a gay man rather than a woman.

==== Imogen Fessler ====
Imogen Fessler (Rachael Maza) (seasons 4–5) is Franky's boss at the legal clinic she works at following her release from Wentworth. Franky hires her as her lawyer after she is arrested for Mike Pennisi's murder.

==== Shayne Butler ====
Shayne Butler (Hunter Page-Lochard) (seasons 4-5) is the son of Jianna Riley, Ferguson's lover, and a foster child after being taken out of Blackmoor prison as a baby by Will. He gets into trouble, but is helped by Franky after Ferguson offers him a place to live. Later Ferguson persuades him to kill a witness against her with a gun in the house but Franky talks him out of it and disposes of the gun. After Franky is arrested for killing Mike Pennisi with the same gun, she tells her lawyer where it came from, and Shayne offers to tell the police despite knowing his parole may be ruined. Franky initially accepts, but after realizing Ferguson didn't have Pennisi killed, she tells him not to.

==== Frosty ====
Frosty (Bart Welch) (season 4) is Shayne Butler's friend. Shayne took the blame for stealing a car which was actually done by Frosty, as Frosty is of age and Shayne is not.

==== Detective Don Kaplan ====
Detective Don Kaplan (Steve Bastoni) (seasons 4-5) is a detective investigating Sonia Stevens for the murder she supposedly committed. He enlists Liz Birdsworth's help to do so, and eventually seduces her into lying and claiming Sonia confessed to her, promising she will be released after. When Liz is caught in the lie, he claims he will try to help her but is revealed to actually have been working with Sonia to get her exonerated. However, he also asks that Sonia reveal what actually happened to her husband. Sonia tries to kill him, but he anticipates this and tricks her, escaping with all her money after providing proof that she killed her husband, sending her back to Wentworth. He is later caught and all his cases are considered tainted, causing Sonia's murder charge and Liz' perjury charge to be dropped. Bastoni appeared in the original Prisoner television series as Peter McCormack.

==== Turk ====
Gregory "Turk" Turkell (Andy McPhee) (seasons 4-6) is a drug dealer who sells Jake drugs to transfer into Wentworth. Jake later gets into debt with him and demands he pay him back in full. When Jake does, he tries to get out, but Turk refuses to abandon the deal, as Wentworth is lucrative. Later, no longer in debt, Jake stops, but Turk later tracks him down and threatens him after Ferguson's escape, asking why the police want to talk to him. Jake is saved by Will, who suspected Turk of being his accomplice.

==== Helen Masters ====
Helen Masters (Heather Lythe) (season 5) is Sonia Stevens' friend, who knew she killed her husband. She tried to blackmail Sonia for money to treat her sister's cancer, but Sonia killed her.

==== Detective Ayoub ====
Detective Ayoub (Maria Mercedes) (seasons 5–6) is a detective investigating Liz Birdsworth for perjury against Sonia Stevens. She believes Liz colluded with someone to incite false testimony. Mercedes appeared in the original Prisoner television series as Irene Zervos and Yemil Bakarta.

==== Lukas ====
Lukas (Phoenix Raei) (seasons 6-7) is Drago's associate on the outside. After Drago and others are arrested, he tries to find out who the snitch is. After Drago's death, he tells Marie he worked for Drago, not her, and no one is looking for her son's killer anymore. He later kills Ray as payback for Drago, and the Conquerors discover this. His fate is unknown following this.

==== Danny Winter ====
Danny Winter (Charles Terrier, Angus Hopkinson, Charles Roland) (seasons 6, 8) is Marie Winter's son. He rapes Ruby's girlfriend, and is attacked by Ruby and put into a coma where he later dies. When Marie is sent to Wentworth she tries to find his killer. When she discovers who it is, she tries to kill Ruby a few times and eventually attempts suicide. When doing so, she sees a vision of Danny and finally makes peace with his death.

==== Shelley Hayes ====
Shelley Hayes (Alinta Chidzey) (season 6) is Ruby Mitchell's ex-girlfriend, who was raped by Danny Winter, resulting in Ruby putting him into a coma, and his death later. When she visits Ruby, Ruby tells her not to say anything about it.

==== Detective Sutton ====
Detective Sutton (Maria Theodorakis) (season 6) is a detective investigating Sonia Stevens for the murder of Sharon Gilmour.

==== Detective Lee ====
Detective Lee (Cameron Moore) (season 6) is a detective investigating Sonia Stevens for the murder of Sharon Gilmour.

==== Detective Jones ====
Detective Jones (Nick Farnell) (seasons 6, 8) is a detective in the undercover unit, he and his partner are Rita's handlers. They try to have her bring down Marie Winter, but erase her files and abandon her after she kills Drago. After Ruby and Rita give their statements, they are suspended from duty, and later kidnap Ruby while she is on day release to force her to retract it. Rita finds them, and in the struggle, his partner is killed, though he escapes and spins the story as them being the victims. Later he visits Marie and tells her Rita is a cop, which she records. The recording is later used by Lou Kelly to turn the prison against Rita, but Allie later recovers it to prove Jones corrupt.

==== Detective Paul Morelli ====
Detective Paul Morelli (Patrick Harvey) (seasons 6, 8) is a detective in the undercover unit, he and his partner Jones are Rita's handlers. They try to have her bring down Marie Winter, but erase her files and abandon her after she kills Drago. After Ruby and Rita give their statements, they are suspended from duty, and later kidnap Ruby while she is on day release to force her to retract it. Rita finds them, and in the struggle, Morelli is killed, though Jones escapes and spins the story as them being the victims. Rita is later charged with his murder.

==== Eddie Romano ====
Eddie Romano (Paul Moder) (seasons 6, 8) is Ruby's boxing trainer. Ruby tells him she will have money when she gets out. Later Jones and Morelli threaten him into giving them Ruby. Rita persuades him to tell this to the police after she finds out, but he is later found dead of a "drug overdose".

==== Blair Mitchell ====
Blair Mitchell (Gregory J. Fryer) (seasons 6, 8) is Rita and Ruby's father. He visits Ruby when he is dying of cancer, and she tells him the truth about Rita. Rita later visits him as he dies and puts Ruby on the phone while it happens, his last words being to ask her to look after Ruby.

==== Detective Collins ====
Detective Collins (Ian Bliss) (seasons 6, 8) is the senior detective investigating the escape of Franky Doyle and Joan Ferguson. Collins reveals to Vera, Jake and Will that Ferguson survived her ordeal and in is hospital in a coma after being attacked by Joe Hoxton. Collins also says that Channing faces further charges.

==== Detective Hydari ====
Detective Hydari (Carolyn Block) (seasons 6, 8) is Detective Collins' partner investigating the escape of Franky Doyle and Joan Ferguson.

==== Ray Houser ====
Ray Houser (Shane Connors) (seasons 6-7) is a high ranking member of the Conquerors motorcycle club, who is dating Rita. Rita met him as part of her deep cover assignment, and he is in love with her. He worries about her being in prison, and eventually manages to settle a problem with another gang called the Butchers, which Rita ruins to maintain her cover. After Rita kills Drago, he has forgiven her and tries to get her to marry him, even after she confesses that she is an undercover cop. She eventually agrees, but when he arrives at the prison, he is shot by Drago's associate as revenge on Rita.

==== Chocco ====
Chocco (Nathaniel Dean) (season 7) is a member of the Conquerors motorcycle club. He visits Rita after Ray's murder, and she tells him the Butchers did it. He later visits her again, telling her the member of the Butchers involved actually went rogue, and the killer was an associate of Drago, killing Ray as payback for her death.

==== Rodney Gavin ====
Rodney Gavin (Bert LaBonte) (seasons 6-7) is Marie Winter's lawyer. He informs her she will be charged with manslaughter after the doctor she assaulted dies of a brain bleed. Later she has him leak information on Derek Channing. Afterward, when Marie's protector attempts to kill her to prevent information from coming out, it is revealed he has already killed Rodney and staged it as a suicide.

==== Michael Heston ====
Michael Heston (David Downer) (seasons 7-8) is the former Attorney General. He initially supported Derek Channing when he was accused of murder, but retracted this when Channing's ownership of multiple brothels was leaked by Marie. He is later revealed to be Marie Winter's protector, though only because she has sensitive information on him, and is a mentor to Sean Brody, who is loyal to him. He has Marie's lawyer killed, and attempts to do the same to Marie, only for her to claim the information will be released if she dies. He is blackmailed into helping her escape, but Will and Rita discover the evidence against him, photographs showing that he is a pedophile, and he is arrested. Marie later agrees to testify against him with evidence not in the photos to reduce her sentence, but this falls through after he commits suicide in prison.

==== Anton ====
Anton (Meyne Wyatt) (season 7) is an associate of Sean Brody who disguises himself as a guard to help him break Marie Winter out. During the siege, he is shot in the shoulder, and later tricked into heading to the roof with most of the hostages, and is arrested.

==== Wes Condi ====
Wes Condi (David Serafin) (season 7) is an associate of Sean Brody who disguises himself as a guard to help him break Marie Winter out. During the siege, he is tricked into heading to the roof with most of the hostages, and is arrested.

==== Rachel Marsh ====
Rachel Marsh (Nicki Wendt) (season 7) is a SWAT team leader who is brought to deal with the siege caused by Sean Brody. She and her team try to help the hostages, but are overruled by Heston. Later, she is present when Will provides photographs of Heston's pedophilia, and her team later catches Allie, Rita, Ruby and Marie after Sean is killed.

==== Vince Spencer ====
Vince Spencer (Steve Nation) (season 7) is a male prostitute who is brought in by Sean Brody and Linda Miles to give Liz one last time before her dementia gets too bad. They have sex, but he dies of a heart attack afterward. Sean leaves his body, fully clothed, in a park, and he is believed to have died of natural causes.

==== Gavin Thompson ====
Gavin Thompson (Huw Higginson) (season 8) is a man who Boomer calls as part of the call center program. She lies to him about herself and he asks to meet her after finding out she is in prison. When they meet, neither is what they claimed to be, but they later meet again, and he reveals he runs a prison porn website and was hoping to meet someone like her through the call center. Boomer agrees to write for his website, and later has him bring a camera in through conjugal, though only agrees to provide material if he gives her sperm to make her pregnant. When he comes to retrieve the camera they make love, but he is caught leaving with it and is arrested, though later released. After Boomer tells him she is pregnant, he promises to be there for her and the child.

==== Alex Maher ====
Alex Maher (Justin Smith) (season 8) is Judy Bryant's lawyer, who interviews her and Allie about fighting Judy's extradition.

==== Fran Mitchell ====
Fran Mitchell (Elaine Cromby) (season 8) is Rita and Ruby's aunt. She takes care of their father in his final days. She is present when he dies, and when the police take Rita away.

==== Travis Kelly ====
Travis Kelly (Jackson Gallagher) (season 8) is Lou Kelly's brother. He smuggles testosterone in for Reb when his treatment is cut off, and later manages their funds on the outside. Later, Rita threatens to have him beaten by the Conquerors, but this is a bluff to get Lou to reveal the recordings proving her innocence.

==== Ron Bryant ====
Ron Bryant (Christopher Kirby) (season 8) is Judy Bryant's father. He is a high ranking government official, and refuses to see her or fight her extradition, believing her to be an embarrassment. Later, he visits her, and tells her it was proven that the evidence against her was planted.

==== Tony Cockburn ====
Tony Cockburn (Peter O'Brien) (season 8) is an NSO agent in charge of investigating Judy Bryant's terrorism charges. He is later revealed to have planted the evidence against her.

==== Dale Langdon ====
Dale Langdon (Gary Sweet) (season 8) is an NSO agent who takes over the investigation into Judy Bryant following the revelation that the evidence against her was planted. He quickly uncovers that Lou and Judy are planning a bomb to go off at Wentworth, but allows it to continue as the evidence they have only implicates Lou, not Judy. He persuades Ann to allow it by revealing Judy has ties to the group that killed her daughter. Eventually, the bomb gets to Wentworth, and he assumes they are trying to escape, and gets to the van containing the bomb just as it goes off, killing him and his team.

==== Joe Hoxton ====
Joe Hoxton (Dion Mills) (season 8) is a homeless man who was a friend of Kath Maxwell, whose identity Joan Ferguson stole after killing her. He notices Joan using her name and approaches her, but she claims she just "has one of those faces", though he realizes she is lying. He attacks her, giving her a blow to the head, and robs her, for which he is arrested, though the blow to her head gives her amnesia.

==== Emile Frazer ====
Emile Frazer (Dave Lawson) (season 8) is an associate of Judy Bryant, who is instructed to bring a bomb to Wentworth to allow her and Lou to break out. Lou changes the order to a bomb massive enough to destroy a wing. After making the bomb, he brings it to Wentworth disguised as a guard, then escapes through the visitor center after changing to look like a civilian.

== See also ==
- List of Wentworth episodes
