= Wentworth season 4 =

Wentworth
- Season 4
- Region 4 DVD Cover
- Starring: Danielle Cormack; Nicole da Silva; Kate Atkinson; Pamela Rabe
- No. of episodes: 12

Release
- Original network: SoHo
- Original release: 10 May – 26 July 2016

Season chronology
- ← Previous; Season 3 Next → Season 5

The fourth season of the television drama series Wentworth premiered on SoHo in Australia on 10 May 2016. It was executively produced by FremantleMedia's Director of Drama, Jo Porter. The season comprises 12 episodes. Season four picks up four months after the fire at Wentworth.

== Plot ==
Four months after the fire at Wentworth, Bea and the other inmates have been housed offsite while they wait for construction to be completed. Season four will see Bea battle two formidable enemies. There is Kaz, made so dangerous by her extremist feminist ideology, who regards Bea as the great betrayer to the cause, and Ferguson who is on a mission to exonerate herself – will the walls of Wentworth be enough to protect the Top Dog?

== Cast ==
=== Regular ===
- Danielle Cormack as Bea Smith
- Nicole da Silva as Franky Doyle
- Celia Ireland as Liz Birdsworth
- Shareena Clanton as Doreen Anderson
- Katrina Milosevic as Sue "Boomer" Jenkins
- Robbie Magasiva as Deputy Governor Will Jackson
- Socratis Otto as Maxine Conway
- Tammy Macintosh as Kaz Proctor
- Kate Jenkinson as Allie Novak
- Bernard Curry as Jake Stewart
- with Kate Atkinson as Governor Vera Bennett
- and Pamela Rabe as Joan Ferguson

=== Special guest ===
- Sigrid Thornton as Sonia Stevens

=== Recurring ===
- Libby Tanner as Bridget Westfall
- Ra Chapman as Kim Chang
- Jacquie Brennan as Linda Miles
- Martin Sacks as Derek Channing
- Sally-Anne Upton as Lucy "Juice" Gambaro
- Hunter Page-Lochard as Shayne Butler
- Luke McKenzie as Nash Taylor
- Charli Tjoe as Tina Mercado
- Steve Bastoni as Don Kaplan
- Maddy Jevic as Lee Radcliffe
- Bessie Holland as Stella Radic
- Sophia Katos as Mel Barrett

== Episodes ==
No. overall	No. in season	Title	Directed by	Written by	Original release date	Aus. viewers
35	1	"First Blood"	Kevin Carlin	John Ridley	10 May 2016	140,000
Four months after the fire, the inmates return to Wentworth after being housed at Walford prison while Wentworth was being rebuilt. Vera is now the Governor and a new regime is afoot at Wentworth. Kaz Proctor and her crew have been remanded to Wentworth and she has gained influence amongst the women. Facing the rest of her life in Wentworth, Bea questions whether she has any purpose in life, or any desire to remain top dog. As Franky struggles to adapt to life as a free woman, Ferguson returns to Wentworth to be housed in protection until her trial.
36	2	"Poking Spiders"	Kevin Carlin	Marcia Gardner	17 May 2016	97,000
Vera learns that Franky and Bridget are in a relationship and decides to have Bridget sacked. Franky and Bridget agree to distance their relationship, as it is a potential violation of Franky's parole conditions. Vera abandons her plans when she realise that she needs Bridget's help to deal with Ferguson, who is plotting to be released into the general prison population. When Vera refuses to initiate conjugal visits for the women, Kaz stages a protest in the yard, and Maxine believes that Kaz is out to usurp Bea as top dog.
37	3	"Prisoner"	Steve Jodrell	Pete McTighe	24 May 2016	81,000
Despite Vera's resistance, Ferguson is released into general and accommodated in a unit with Kaz and her crew. Vera warns Bea that any reprisals against Ferguson will result in the loss of the new privileges she has given the inmates, particularly the conjugal visits. Vera and Bridget wonder if Ferguson has a strategy in mind or if she merely has a death wish. Ferguson receives unlikely support from Doreen when she reveals that she saved her baby Joshua from Jess, and attempts to make a deal with Bea. Things do not go according to plan as Ferguson is subjected to a brutal gang rape in the showers from Juice and her 'boys'.
38	4	"Screw Lover"	Steve Jodrell	Michael Lucas	31 May 2016	97,000
Disgusted by Ferguson's ordeal, Kaz keeps an all-night vigil to tend to her wounds and offers her protection. Accepted into Kaz's crew, Ferguson strengthens her new alliance by telling Kaz that Will is responsible for organising the assault. Kaz swears revenge and she and her crew prepare to ambush Will in the kitchen. Bea comes to Will's rescue but is branded as a "screw lover" and loses the women's support. Bea is forced to take drastic measures to secure her position as top dog. Conjugal visits begin at Wentworth, and Boomer desperately tries to get pregnant. Meanwhile, Maxine is diagnosed with breast cancer and can't bring herself to tell the other women.
39	5	"Love and Hate"	Jet Wilkinson	John Ridley	7 June 2016	103,000
Bea has been slotted for her attack on Will and bonds with Allie when they spend hours talking in adjoining cells. New officer Jake Stewart starts work at Wentworth and attempts to befriend Will. Ferguson continues to manipulate Kaz, bonding with her after Kaz hears of the death of her abusive father. Ferguson seeks to position Kaz as a potential top dog rival with slurs over Maxine's transgender status, tapping into Kaz's trauma. New Indigenous prisoner, Tasha, joins the women and Ferguson deliberately points her out to Juice and her crew. When Tasha breaks the rules by pressing the alarm to save herself from Juice, Maxine must decide what action to take.
40	6	"Divide and Conquer"	Jet Wilkinson	Marcia Gardner	14 June 2016	119,000
Bea is released from the slot and Juice demands that Tasha is punished for breaking the rules. Bea's subsequent rough justice leads Tasha to attempt suicide only for Ferguson to gain favour when she saves her. Maxine reveals that she delayed her cancer treatment to hold the fort for Bea, and Doreen is disgusted by Bea's actions and turns against her. Liz is offered a deal by the police in return for gaining the trust of a new prisoner remanded on a murder charge and getting her to confess. Sonia Stevens is admitted to Wentworth, and Liz agrees to the deal. Doreen becomes jealous and paranoid after Nash tells her that he has moved in with his ex-girlfriend, who is looking after Joshua, and asks Kaz for help.
41	7	"Panic Button"	Adrian Russell Wills	Pete McTighe	21 June 2016	121,000
Bea is rapidly losing control amongst the women after Doreen publicly defies her. With Kaz poised to gain from Bea's diminishing popularity, Bea suggests a prison-wide vote to see if the top dog position is still viable. Not wanting a change due to the prison regime, Vera rigs the votes in Bea's favour. Boomer tries to persuade Maxine to have the surgery for her cancer. Ferguson is unsettled when she discovers that Bea will be supporting Jesper's evidence in court. Kaz receives a heavy sentence for her vigilante activities, and Ferguson proposes an alliance against Bea. However, Bea is not interested in prison politics as she becomes closer to Allie.
42	8	"Plan Bea"	Adrian Russell Wills	Michael Lucas	28 June 2016	84,000
Maxine leaves the prison to undergo a double mastectomy leaving Boomer distraught. Sonia begins to confide in Liz, while Vera struggles with her growing feelings for Jake. Bea opens up to Allie as they continue their illicit relationship. In the midst of a prison strike organised by Kaz, Ferguson drugs Bea and attempts to drown her in the kitchen. Jackson informs Kaz about Ferguson's role in her capture. Kaz and her sisters save Bea from being killed by Ferguson. As punishment for manipulating her, Kaz burns Ferguson's left arm in the deep fryer.
43	9	"Afterlife"	Steve Jodrell	Michael Lucas	5 July 2016	110,000
Bea recovers after the attempt on her life and is devastated when Kaz insinuates that Allie was using Bea to make her vulnerable. Tensions rise between Kaz and Allie as Allie learns of Kaz's involvement in Ferguson's scheming. As Ferguson in turn recovers from her own injuries, Vera orders that she will remain in the medical unit until her trial and assigns Jake the task of supervising her. Maxine is back after her surgery and finds herself in the middle of rising tension between Boomer, Liz, and Sonia. Bea receives a visit from Franky, who offers her assistance to bring Ferguson down.
44	10	"Smitten"	Steve Jodrell	Samantha Winston	12 July 2016	110,000
Allie relapses into her drug addiction. Bea later learns that Allie saved her life, and she resolves to remove her from Kaz's orbit and help her through withdrawal. As Ferguson reaches out to Jianna's son, Shayne, as part of her scheme to secure her release, Franky is also on Shayne's trail. Sonia begins to become suspicious of Liz's constant questioning. Jake and Vera grow closer, while Jake also falls for Ferguson's manipulation. Boomer and Maxine embark on a madcap scheme for Boomer to impregnate herself with Maxine's frozen sperm.
45	11	"Eleventh Hour"	Kevin Carlin	John Ridley	19 July 2016	123,000
Bea and Allie finally make their relationship known to the other women. Allie is sentenced, and declares her love for Bea. Doreen is upset by Nash and Joshua's departure for Western Australia. Jake smuggles drugs into Wentworth and continues to get in too deep with Ferguson, who offers to pay his debts on the outside in return for his services. Ferguson continues to manipulate Shayne, telling him that Will recommended that he was taken into care away from Jianna, and thus caused his mother's suicide. Jake and Will go out on the town, and Jake gives him drugs. Bea orders drug runner Tina Mercado to dispose of the drug stash, but Tina refuses, scheming with Kaz to depose Bea as top dog. When the other inmates learn that Bea lagged to the Governor she steps down as top-dog. However, their happiness is short-lived when Ferguson, with the help of Jake, sends Allie into a drug-induced coma.
46	12	"Seeing Red"	Kevin Carlin	Pete McTighe	26 July 2016	95,000
A distraught Bea grapples with news of Allie's drug induced coma. Initially lashing out at Kaz, the two realize that Ferguson is behind Allie's coma. Ferguson faces her day in court on charges of hiring Nils Jasper to assassinate Matt. Franky manages to convince Shayne to abandon his plan to kill Nils Jasper but Jake, under Ferguson's orders, murders Jasper while he is being transported to court. Meanwhile, Boomer is determined to help Maxine through the chemotherapy. Liz is convinced of Sonia's innocence but soon has cause to question her feelings. Kaz takes over as the new top dog. Without Jasper, the Crown's case against Ferguson collapses. Ferguson is freed but her freedom is short-lived when Bea shockingly goads Ferguson into stabbing her. After realising what she has done, a disgruntled Joan stands, shaking as Bea utters "I win", before collapsing. Bea then looks into the sky and sees two seahorses, an emblem of her love for Allie, and makes peace with the fact that her time has come to an end, saying "It's going to be okay".

== Production ==
On 27 February 2015, it was announced that FremantleMedia had renewed Wentworth for a fourth season, set to air in 2016.

Jo Porter, the Director of Drama at FremantleMedia stated, "Without wanting to give away any specific spoilers from season three, suffice to say it builds to a fabulous crescendo that in turn has given our season four writers a fantastic launch pad to explore what is next for the complex and compelling characters of Wentworth. Our loyal Wentworth fans are not going to be disappointed and I know our amazing cast and crew are going to relish bringing to life these potent stories."

Penny Win, the Head of Drama at Foxtel stated, "All of us at Foxtel and FremantleMedia Australia are extremely proud of Wentworth and the passionate bond the series has forged with drama lovers, starting with our discerning Foxtel subscribers and expanding to captivate audiences around the world."

On 5 November 2015, it was announced that Sigrid Thornton would step through the gates of Wentworth Correctional Centre, becoming the first actress from the original series, Prisoner to play a major re-occurring role in the reimagination. Moreover, she also plays Sonia Stevens, an inmate featured in the original series, albeit played by Tina Bursill.

Of Sigrid's casting, Penny Win stated, "Wentworth's fourth season continues the series' finely-honed evolution as a world class contemporary drama which proudly forges its own path, while fearlessly daring to reimagine characters and elements of the iconic Prisoner series. Having Sigrid Thornton sign on to return behind the walls of Wentworth is a casting dream and a wonderful acknowledgement of the work the writing team has put into the creation of Sonia Stevens and our plans for her and all our characters."

Jo Porter stated, "Sigrid was always on the top of our casting wish list – adored and admired by audiences for the strong women she has chosen to portray. From the second Sonia Stevens steps from the brawler, there is an unsettling sense all is not as it may seem. I am sure audiences will relish watching Sonia’s long game play out across season four."

== Reception ==
=== Ratings ===
No.	Title	Air date	Overnight ratings		Ref(s)
No.	Title	Air date	Viewers	Rank	Ref(s)
1	"First Blood"	10 May 2016	140,000	1	
2	"Poking Spiders"	17 May 2016	97,000	2	
3	"Prisoner"	24 May 2016	81,000	4	
4	"Screw Lover"	31 May 2016	97,000	3	
5	"Love and Hate"	7 June 2016	103,000	3	
6	"Divide and Conquer"	14 June 2016	119,000	1	
7	"Panic Button"	21 June 2016	121,000	1	
8	"Plan Bea"	28 June 2016	84,000	3	
9	"Afterlife"	5 July 2016	110,000	1	
10	"Smitten"	12 July 2016	110,000	1	
11	"Eleventh Hour"	19 July 2016	123,000	1	
12	"Seeing Red"	26 July 2016	95,000	2	

=== Accolades ===
AACTA Awards

- Won: Best Television Drama Series — Wentworth - Pino Amenta & Jo Porter
- Nominated: Best Lead Actress in a Television Drama — Danielle Cormack
- Nominated: Best Lead Actress in a Television Drama — Pamela Rabe
- Nominated: Best Direction in a Television Drama or Comedy — Kevin Carlin (for "Seeing Red")
- Won: Best Editing in Television — Ben Joss (for "Prisoner")

Australian Writers' Guild Awards

- Nominated: Best Script for a Television Series — Michael Lucas (for "Plan Bea")
- Nominated: Best Script for a Television Series or Miniseries — Pete McTighe (for "Seeing Red")

Logie Awards

- Nominated: Most Outstanding Actress — Danielle Cormack
- Nominated: Most Outstanding Supporting Actress — Nicole da Silva
- Nominated: Best Drama Program — Wentworth
- Nominated: Most Outstanding Drama Series — Wentworth

== Home media ==
Title	Release	Country	DVD	Blu-ray	Region	Ref(s)
Wentworth: The Complete Season 4	5 October 2016	Australia	Yes	Yes	4/B	
Wentworth Prison: Season Four	7 November 2016	UK	Yes	No	2	
Wentworth: Die Komplette Vierte Staffel	25 May 2018	Germany	Yes	No	2	
Additional
Distributor: Roadshow Entertainment (Australia); Network (United Kingdom); WVG Medien (Germany); Set details: 12 episodes; 560 minutes; 1.78:1 aspect ratio; DVD Audio: English: Dolby Digital 5.1 (regions 2 & 4); English: Dolby Digital 2.0 (region 2 Germany); Deutsch: Dolby Digital 2.0 (region 2 Germany); Blu-ray Audio: English: DTS-Master Audio 2.0 (Region B Australia); Subtitles: None (DVD Germany); English SDH (DVD & Blu-ray Australia); Discs: 4-DVD set (region 2 UK); 4-DVD set (region 2 Germany); 4-DVD set (Region 4); 3-Blu-ray set (Region B Australia); Rating: ACB: MA15+; BBFC: 18; FSK: 16; Notes: Not yet available in United States; Not available on Blu-ray in Germany
