= Sonia Stevens =

- Wentworth Prison character
- First appearance: "Divide and Conquer"
- Last appearance: "The Edge"
- Created by: Lara Radulovich
- Portrayed by: Sigrid Thornton
- Status: Deceased; murdered by Kaz Proctor.
- Duration: 2016-2018
- Episode Count: 25
- Crime: On remand, awaiting trial for murder of her husband. Acquitted of Helen Masters’ murder in S5. Charged, entered a guilty plea at committal.
- Sentence: Awaiting trial

In-universe information
- Occupation: Businesswoman
- Affiliation: Detective Don Kaplan; Susan ‘Boomer’ Jenkins
- Nationality: Australian

Sonia Stevens is a character in Wentworth. Initially a secondary antagonist in the fourth and fifth season, she becomes the primary antagonist in the sixth, following the departure of Joan Ferguson (Pamela Rabe). Sonia was played by Sigrid Thornton. Thornton had previously appeared on the original Prisoner as Ros Coulson.

== Background and development ==
The wentworth website states, "Sonia is the wealthy, self-made dynamo behind a cosmetics empire that was owned and run by her late husband, Geoffrey Stevens. While Geoffrey was from a wealthy family, Sonia was not. And while Geoffrey was something of a dabbler, Sonia was passionate, hard working and always had the ability to focus on a goal, no matter how elusive it may first seem. And she is rather ruthless. If necessary, she’ll walk over those in her way, particularly if they’re too stupid or lazy to get the hell out of it. Of course, she can be charming too, as evidenced by the fact she managed to charm her way into the heart and luxurious lap of one of the establishment’s most eligible bachelors."

A representative said about Thornton's casting as Sonia "“Having Sigrid Thornton sign on to return behind the walls of Wentworth is a casting dream and a wonderful acknowledgement of the work the writing team has put into the creation of Sonia Stevens and our plans for her and all our characters."

Thornton described Sonia's exit as "all or nothing" for her character.

== Storylines ==
Sonia first appears in Season 4, Episode 6 'Divide and Conquer', having been remanded at Wentworth pending trial for the murder of her friend, Helen Masters. The entire evidence against Sonia is circumstantial and in an attempt to secure a conviction, Detective Don Kaplan approaches Liz Birdsworth (Celia Ireland) offers her immediate parole in exchange for obtaining a confession from Sonia. Initially reluctant, Liz is desperate to be free from prison and agrees. Throughout the rest of Season 4, Liz repeatedly attempts to get Sonia to talk about Helen's murder but Sonia remains aloof and adamant of her innocence. Liz considers retracting her offer to assist the police but becomes certain of Sonia's guilt when, in the season finale, she delivers a cryptic message, when cutting Maxine Conway's hair, that she may have had something to do with the murder, referring to cutting hair as taking a crown away (Helen Masters had had her hair cut off shortly after her murder).

In Season 5, Sonia remains aloof. Don Kaplan grows impatient and advises Liz to lie under oath in court. Despite being warned off by Doreen Anderson (Shareena Clanton), Liz agrees. However, when giving evidence in court, Sonia's defence team produce evidence that ultimately prove that Liz is lying and Sonia is cleared of all charges. When relaxing at home that evening, Sonia is visited by Don, thus revealing that he had been conspiring with her all along. Flashbacks reveal that Sonia had in fact murdered Helen, who had attempted to blackmail her over the mysterious death of her husband. Sonia then turned to Don for assistance in concealing Helen's body. Unable to protect Sonia from being charged, he informs her the only way to free her is to get her cleared of all charges when it came to court. They choose Liz as their patsy. Don then asks Sonia what really happened to Geoffrey Stevens. Initially reluctant to talk about it, Sonia agrees to show him where she hid his body. However she secretly plans to murder him. Don suspects this and overpowers her, fleeing abroad, but not before anonymously reporting Sonia to the police. She is arrested and charged with her husband's murder.
