= Wentworth season 6 =

Wentworth
- Season 6
- Region 4 DVD Cover
- Starring: Nicole da Silva; Leah Purcell; Sigrid Thornton; Susie Porter; Celia Ireland; Katrina Milosevic; Robbie J Magasiva; Tammy Macintosh; Kate Jenkinson; Bernard Curry; Rarriwuy Hick; Kate Atkinson
- No. of episodes: 12

Release
- Original network: Showcase
- Original release: 19 June – 4 September 2018

Season chronology
- ← Previous; Season 5 Next → Season 7

The sixth season of the Australian television drama series Wentworth premiered on Showcase on 19 June 2018 and concluded on 4 September 2018. It was executively produced by FremantleMedia's Director of Drama, Jo Porter. The season comprised 12 episodes, and picks up days after the escape of Franky Doyle and Joan Ferguson. This season introduced three new characters portrayed by Leah Purcell, Susie Porter and Rarriwuy Hick.

== Plot ==
Several days have passed since the daring escape of Franky Doyle and Joan Ferguson. Kaz prepares to take on the role of Top Dog again after Ferguson's demise. Sonia Stevens' life and Governor Bennett's career are at risk as Boomer investigates the events surrounding Sonia's apparent poisoning. Liz grows increasingly fearful for her life. Will experiences flashbacks of Ferguson's presumed final moments. Rita Connors enters Wentworth with a hidden secret that could alter everything. Joining her are Ruby Mitchell and Marie Winter.

== Cast ==
=== Main ===
- Leah Purcell as Rita Connors
- Sigrid Thornton as Sonia Stevens
- Susie Porter as Marie Winter
- Celia Ireland as Liz Birdsworth
- Katrina Milosevic as Sue "Boomer" Jenkins
- Robbie J Magasiva as Deputy Governor Will Jackson
- Tammy Macintosh as Kaz Proctor
- Kate Jenkinson as Allie Novak
- Bernard Curry as Jake Stewart
- Rarriwuy Hick as Ruby Mitchell
- Kate Atkinson as Governor Vera Bennett
- Nicole da Silva as Franky Doyle

=== Special guest ===
- Pamela Rabe as Joan Ferguson

=== Recurring ===
- Libby Tanner as Bridget Westfall
- Jacquie Brennan as Linda Miles
- Sally-Anne Upton as Lucy "Juice" Gambaro
- Maddy Jevic as Nurse Lee Radcliffe
- Artemis Ioannides as Vicky Kosta
- Kate Elliot as Spike Baxter
- Sun Park as Cherry Li
- Emily Havea as Mon Alston
- Catherine Larcey as Sharon Gilmour
- Bessie Holland as Stella Radic
- Sarah Hallam as Jen "Hutch" Hutchins
- Katerina Kotsonis as Brenda Murphy
- Stefan Dennis as Michael Armstrong QC
- Martin Sacks as Derek Channing
- Shane Connor as Ray Houser
- Natalia Novikova as Zara "Drago" Dragovich

== Episodes ==
No. overall	No. in season	Title	Directed by	Written by	Original release date	Aus. viewers
59	1	"Clean Slate"	Kevin Carlin	Pete McTighe	19 June 2018	101,000
Franky Doyle and Joan Ferguson are still missing. While Ferguson's fate remains unknown, Franky is still on the run and desperately attempts to come up with the evidence that she is innocent of the murder of Mike Pennisi. She visits Bridget and narrowly escapes cops. Liz fears for her safety when news has surfaced that Sonia was poisoned and is to make a full recovery. Jake discovers that Vera let Bea Smith wander into a restricted area of the prison in order to attack Joan, and keeps this evidence to blackmail Vera. A new inmate, Rita Connors, arrives at Wentworth and immediately crosses Kaz when she takes the rap for recently transferred inmate, Ruby Mitchell, when she violently attacks Spike Baxter; it is revealed that Ruby is Rita's long lost sister. Vera discovers she is pregnant by Jake.
60	2	"The Boxer"	Kevin Carlin	Marcia Gardner	26 June 2018	87,000
Sonia returns to Wentworth and is determined to take her revenge on Liz. However, she unintentionally kills Sharon Gilmour in the showers, mistaking her for Liz. Ruby continues to push Rita away while she sinks deeper into despair as she has constant memories of the past. Ruby is provoked into partaking in secret fighting matches, organized by several of the other inmates. Vera confides in Bridget about her pregnancy, while Jake's guilt of blackmailing Vera gets the better of him and he decides to back down. Franky stumbles upon crucial evidence that can clear her name.
61	3	"Bleed Out"	Fiona Banks	John Ridley	3 July 2018	105,000
Franky is seriously wounded and seeks Bridget's help. Sonia convinces Liz to tell her solicitor that she was used by Don. Kaz discovers that Rita took the rap for Ruby for beating up Spike. The fight club continues and Ruby is injured during a match with Spike. Kaz agrees to a fight with Kosta before it is interrupted by the officers. Will confronts Kaz about being a secret "lagger". The police discover that Franky is innocent and she is finally set free.
62	4	"Winter Is Here"	Fiona Banks	Andrew Anastasios	10 July 2018	83,000
Brothel owner Marie Winter arrives at Wentworth to serve her sentence for assaulting a doctor who advised cutting off her son Daniel's life support. Marie's arrival upsets Allie, one of her former prostitutes and her former lover. Rita goes to great lengths to keep Ruby out of trouble and agrees to be Marie's bodyguard, upsetting Ruby. Sonia makes a deal with Vera to reopen the workshop in return for identifying Sharon's killer. Sonia frames Spike for killing Sharon. Will cracks under pressure as he confesses to Jake that he buried Ferguson alive.
63	5	"Bitter Pill"	Roger Hodgman	John Ridley	17 July 2018	71,000
Vera undergoes her first pregnancy scan and is indecisive as to whether or not she is going to keep the baby. Kaz threatens Marie when she and Allie discover that she is using some of the inmates to smuggle drugs into Wentworth. Jake is injured while saving Liz from being electrocuted. Will is struggling with his sanity and begins having nightmares. Rita lands herself in trouble following a violent confrontation with Kosta and her gang. Sonia's workshop becomes a success in the press. Ruby continues to help Boomer study for her certification test. Liz fears she is going mad and reveals all to Kaz regarding Sonia. Marie is surprised to see Zara as a new inmate.
64	6	"Angel of Wentworth"	Roger Hodgman	Andrew Anastasios & Marcia Gardner	24 July 2018	82,000
Marie and Zara become suspicious of Rita, while Rita comes up with a plan to get Zara out of the way. Boomer takes her exam and anxiously awaits the results. Will becomes frantic and confesses everything to Kaz about what he did to Ferguson. Vera, Will, and Kaz begin to suspect that Sonia was behind Sharon Gilmour's murder. Liz begins to think she is suffering from dementia. During the radio interview, Liz is ambushed by Sonia when she reveals that Liz is 'Witness X', putting her in a dangerous position with the other prisoners for lagging. Sonia is later informed that she will be released within 48 hours due to Liz's confession. Later, Kaz lets Sonia know that her days may be numbered once Spike is released from the slot.
65	7	"The Edge"	Sian Davies	Pete McTighe	31 July 2018	77,000
Sonia comes up with a plan to set Kaz up against the other women which eventually backfires. Will begins to have terrifying visions of Ferguson and turns to Marie for comfort. Liz is finally diagnosed with dementia. Sonia begins to realize that her time is running out when she is attacked by Spike, and is later charged for Gilmour's murder due to her confessing to Liz. Liz becomes confused and thinks Don is in the prison and heads to the roof with Sonia following close behind. Kaz finds them both on the roof and a fight ensues, with Kaz pushing Sonia to her death and taking responsibility for it, finally starting to live up to her position as "top dog".
66	8	"Lovers and Fighters"	Sian Davies	John Ridley and Marcia Gardner	7 August 2018	91,000
Allie is informed that Ruby could die of a brain aneurysm if she continues to fight. Upon release from the slot, Kaz decides to let the fight club continue, claiming half the profits for the Red Right Hand. Marie discovers that Ruby was with her son the night he was attacked and is intent on getting information from her. Rita reveals to Marie that she is Ruby's sister. Later, Ruby confesses to Rita that she king-hit Marie's son after he raped one of her friends. Vera becomes the target of a stalker and is convinced that it is Jake, however it is later revealed to be someone else when Vera discovers a pair of leather gloves on her bed, while Jake was with Will at Wentworth.
67	9	"Shallow Grave"	Fiona Banks	John Ridley	14 August 2018	91,000
Liz's condition is worsening and is rapidly taking control of her life. Marie enlists the help of Allie in extracting information from Ruby about the death of her son Danny. Marie and Zara are convinced that Rita is the "rat". Vera discovers that Jake had a role in Nils Jasper’s death. Will continues to have tormenting visions of Ferguson taunting him, and confesses all to Vera. Will, Vera, and Jake go to where Ferguson is buried and discover a decayed corpse inside the makeshift box as an unseen onlooker takes incriminating photos of the trio.
68	10	"Fractured"	Fiona Banks	Pete McTighe	21 August 2018	103,000
Vera, Will, and Jake are blackmailed with the photos of them at Ferguson's grave. Boomer receives good news from Sonia's solicitor that Sonia had organized to have an appeal set up for her. Liz confuses Zara with Boomer, accusing Boomer of bashing Cherry Li and Boomer is slotted when the weapon is found in her cell. Allie informs Ruby that a friend of hers could be next on Marie's list in the search for the person who murdered her son, Danny. Marie offers Liz the opportunity to take her own life, which is stopped by Kaz. Kaz then decides to punish Marie by switching the pure heroin Marie has with a stash laced with rat poison.
69	11	"Indelible Ink"	Kevin Carlin	John Ridley & Marcia Gardner	28 August 2018	82,000
Vera and Will confront Derek Channing, who tells them he is on the hunt for Ferguson for revenge. Channing later tries to blackmail Vera after convincing himself that she is working with Ferguson but winds up being blackmailed himself with incriminating information obtained by Marie. Rita discovers that Marie has obtained enhanced CCTV photos of the person who killed Danny, showing the tattoo on Ruby's neck and convinces her to remove it. Believing that Liz framed her, Boomer reveals Liz’s dementia to the other prisoners. Later, Zara makes the connection that Ruby killed Danny. Allie tells Marie that Kaz was the one who planted rat poison in her cell, prompting Marie to later start a brutal fight with Kaz. Vera is again contacted by the stalker, instructed to leave the money by Bea Smith's grave, however the bag is filled with pamphlets. The following morning, the police arrive at Ferguson's burial site, having received a tip-off from the stalker.
70	12	"Showdown"	Kevin Carlin	Pete McTighe	4 September 2018	102,000
The police arrive at Wentworth to question all staff about Ferguson's escape. The stalker is revealed to be Brenda Murphy and she demands the money from Vera or she will give the photos to the police and press. Meanwhile, Rita uses her police connections to get them to drop the assault charges against Boomer and to transfer Ruby to a different prison. Zara is determined to kill Ruby and forces Liz to pass on a note to Marie. Rita finally reveals to Ruby she is still an undercover cop; she takes Ruby's place in the fight and brutally beats Zara to death to save Ruby. Vera has a fall and goes to the hospital, where it is revealed that she had changed her mind about the baby and is still pregnant. Jake discovers the pregnancy, but Vera tells him that he will have no part in the baby's life. Later, Murphy arrives to collect the blackmail money from Vera, but she is assassinated by a delusional Channing, who believed she was Ferguson. Channing is arrested, and Will and Jake take this opportunity to pin everything on Channing, putting them all in the clear. Rita's actions wind up severing her lifeline with the police. Marie breaks her blackmail flash drive in front of Rita, indicating she knew that Rita was an undercover cop. The episode ends with Rita and Marie across from each other in solitary, hinting at a future war between the two. Zara's note to Marie is revealed to state, "Ruby is the killer"; it remains in a forgetful Liz's possession.

== Production ==
On 9 May 2017, it was announced that FremantleMedia had renewed Wentworth for a sixth season, set to air in 2018.

FremantleMedia's Director of Drama, Jo Porter, said "Getting to a sixth season is something none of us take for granted. Key to this is the unwavering dedication to the show by the incredible Wentworth audience both in Australia and around the world. Like us they are drawn to our exceptional cast who embody the diverse, complex and intriguing characters who populate the intense world of Wentworth and its high stakes and compelling stories."

Foxtel's Head of Drama, Penny Win, mentioned, "As Foxtel's longest-running original drama (originally created by Channel 10 as "Prisoner" in 1979), Wentworth continues to set a high bar for our local production slate. With season five premiering in Australia on Foxtel, there is much yet to unfold. My lips are sealed about the sixth season details. Marcia Gardner and the writers excel in setting up intriguing story arcs and crafting finely scripted narratives for the wonderfully talented Wentworth cast."

== Reception ==
=== Ratings ===
No.	Title	Air date	Overnight ratings		Ref(s)
No.	Title	Air date	Viewers	Rank	Ref(s)
1	"Clean Slate"	19 June 2018	101,000	1	
2	"The Boxer"	26 June 2018	87,000	2	
3	"Bleed Out"	3 July 2018	105,000	1	
4	"Winter Is Here"	10 July 2018	83,000	2	
5	"Bitter Pill"	17 July 2018	71,000	2	
6	"Angel of Wentworth"	24 July 2018	82,000	1	
7	"The Edge"	31 July 2018	77,000	2	
8	"Lovers and Fighters"	7 August 2018	91,000	2	
9	"Shallow Grave"	14 August 2018	91,000	1	
10	"Fractured"	21 August 2018	103,000	1	
11	"Indelible Ink"	28 August 2018	82,000	3	
12	"Showdown"	4 September 2018	102,000	1	

=== Accolades ===
AACTA Awards

- Nominated: Best Lead Actress in a Television Drama – Leah Purcell
- Nominated: Best Guest or Supporting Actress in a Television Drama – Celia Ireland
- Nominated: Best Television Drama Series – Wentworth

Equity Ensemble Awards

- Nominated: Most Outstanding Performance by an Ensemble in a Drama Series – Wentworth

Logie Awards

- Nominated: Most Outstanding Actor – Robbie Magasiva
- Nominated: Most Outstanding Actress – Leah Purcell
- Nominated: Most Outstanding Supporting Actor – Bernard Curry
- Nominated: Most Outstanding Supporting Actress – Celia Ireland
- Nominated: Most Popular Drama Program – Wentworth
- Won: Most Outstanding Drama Series – Wentworth

Screen Producers Australia

- Nominated: SPA Award for Drama Series Production of the Year – Wentworth

== Home media ==
Title	Release	Country	DVD	Blu-ray	Region	Ref(s)
Wentworth: The Complete Season 6	3 October 2018	Australia	Yes	Yes	4/B	
Wentworth Prison: Season Six	15 October 2018	UK	Yes	No	2	
Additional
Distributor: Roadshow Entertainment (Australia); Network (United Kingdom); Set details: 12 episodes; 554 minutes; 1.78:1 aspect ratio; DVD Audio: English: Dolby Digital 5.1 (regions 2 & 4); Blu-ray Audio: English: DTS-Master Audio 2.0 (Region B Australia); Subtitles: English SDH (DVD & Blu-ray Australia); Discs: 4-DVD set (region 2 UK); 4-DVD set (Region 4); 3-Blu-ray set (Region B Australia); Rating: ACB: MA15+; BBFC: 18
