= Treasure & Dirt =

Australian drama series

- Genre: Drama
- Based on: Treasure & Dirt by Chris Hammer
- Screenplay by: Matt Cameron, with Kate Mulvany
- Directed by: Madeleine Gottlieb
- Starring: Michael Dorman; Liv Hewson; Sarah Peirse; Kris McQuade; Bessie Holland; Glenda Linscott
- Country of origin: Australia
- Original language: English

Production
- Executive producers: Ian Collie; Rob Gibson; Matt Cameron
- Producer: Rebecca Summerton
- Production company: Easy Tiger Productions

Original release
- Network: ABC Television
- Release: 19 July 2026

Treasure & Dirt is an Australian crime drama and psychological thriller series for ABC Television, released on 19 July 2026. It is also going to be broadcast on BBC One in the UK later in the year. The series was produced by Easy Tiger and based on the novel written by Chris Hammer. A dying opal town hiding many secrets is pulled into a murder investigation where the townspeople are more hindrance than help.

== Plot ==
A dying opal town in the middle of the desert is left needing answers after a body is found in the local mine. Ivan Lucic is sent to investigate alongside local officer Nell Buchanan and through the investigation they find out just how truly warped the town is.

It was described as "an atmospheric, multi-layered, psychological thriller where the isolation, heat and barren landscape add to the many challenges the investigative team must overcome to solve a rivetingly complex crime" by Sue Deeks of BBC Acquisitions.

== Cast ==
- Michael Dorman as Ivan Lucic
- Liv Hewson as Narelle 'Nell' Buchanan
- Sarah Peirse as Sergeant Patricia Richter
- Elena Carapetis as Billie
- Glenda Linscott as Packenham
- Kelton Pell as Ray Penuch
- Ling Cooper Tang as Lady Mayoress Lydia Tallon
- Mark Mitchinson as Mayor Doug
- Steve Le Marquand as Garry Ahern
- Kris McQuade as Colleen Delaney
- Bessie Holland as Dr Carole Ness, forensic pathologist
- Nic Darrigo as Dazzler
- Thomas M. Wright as David "the Seer"
- Dean O'Gorman as The Irishman
- Nathan Jones as Man Mountain
- Eamon Farren as Robby Inglis

== Production ==
On 20 November 2025, the series was first announced at ABC's 2026 Upfronts with the drama slate programs for the following year. Funding had been secured from Screen Australia and the South Australian Film Corporation. On 21 November, it was acquired by BBC One and BBC iPlayer from Sphere Abacus in November 2025.

The series is based on a novel by Chris Hammer, titled Treasure & Dirt in Australia and Opal Country in the UK. Matt Cameron, along with co-writer Kate Mulvany, wrote the screenplay. Cameron wrote all six episodes apart from episode 2, which was penned by Mulvany.

Treasure & Dirt was filmed on location in Coober Pedy, South Australia, bringing in over 100 jobs to the local economy. Edward Goldner was responsible for the cinematography, and the series was edited by Tyson Williams.

The series is directed by Madeleine Gottlieb and produced by Rebecca Summerton, via production studio Easy Tiger Productions. The executive producers were Ian Collie and Rob Gibson for Easy Tiger, along with Matt Cameron. It was made for the ABC in association with the BBC and the South Australian Film Corporation (SAFC), supported by the SAFC and ABC TV.

Original music was composed by Jackson Milas, with the soundtrack produced and released through Sonar Music.

== Episodes ==
No.	Title	Directed by	Written by	Original release date
1	"The Night Is Perfect For Ratting"	Madeleine Gottlieb	Matt Cameron	19 July 2026
2	"All The Creatures"	Madeleine Gottlieb	Kate Mulvany	26 July 2026
3	"The Dead Tree"	Madeleine Gottlieb	Matt Cameron	2 August 2026
4	"Ouroboros"	Madeleine Gottlieb	Matt Cameron	9 August 2026
5	"The Butcher"	Madeleine Gottlieb	Matt Cameron	16 August 2026
6	"The Ninth Circle"	Madeleine Gottlieb	Matt Cameron	23 August 2026

== Release ==
On 18 June 2026, ABC released the trailer for the series. On 19 July 2026, the series aired all episodes on ABC iview.

== Reception ==
Luke Buckmaster of The Guardian rated the series 5 out of 5 stars, calling it "a gloriously strange detective mystery, unlike any you've seen before", and "atmospherically... very well-judged, with a faded, weather-beaten look – sparse but evocative".

David Knox of TV Tonight rated the series 4 out 5 stars stated that "While it is unapologetically slow-burn, the beauty of this seared universe is in the casting of its kooky characters".

Journalist Craig Mathieson for Sydney Morning Herald also rated it the same praising the performances of the actors and the ABC for taking a ambitious risk with the series.

Another rated the same came from Anthony Morris of Screen Hub who praised the direction, the actors and the storyline stating "As a mystery, its solid work. It finds its way towards being something a bit stranger and more powerful than the usual small town murder investigation".
