= Show Out =

Show Out may refer to:

- "Show Out" (Juicy J song), 2013
- "Show Out" (Kid Cudi, Skepta and Pop Smoke song), 2020
- "Show Out" (Roscoe Dash song), 2010
- "Show Out" (Unk song), 2008
- "Show Out", a song by Akon from his 2004 album Trouble

== See also ==
- Show up (disambiguation)
