= Show up =

Show up may refer to:

- Show-up, another name for a police lineup
- Show Up!, 2023 Cantonese studio album by Joey Yung

== See also ==
- "Show Up Queen", a 2021 episode of RuPaul's Drag Race All Stars season 6
- Showing Up, 2022 American comedy-drama film
- Showing Up (horse), American thoroughbred race horse foaled in 2003
- Showdown (disambiguation)
- Show out (disambiguation)
