= Showdown (game) =

Trivia and word game

- Players: 2 or more
- Playing time: 10 mins per round
- Chance: Low
- Age range: 10 and over
- Skills: General knowledge, popular culture knowledge, numeracy, literacy

Showdown is a trivia and word game that tests players’ general and popular culture knowledge, as well as their numerical skills and willingness to bluff and take a risk. It makes use of the Summit (puzzle) scoring system which awards higher scores for long answers containing letters towards the end of the alphabet.

Showdown is one of the first boxed games to integrate mobile telephone and text message technology, as players can text their answers to a Showdown number which calculates the value of their answers and replies within 10 seconds with their score. The game was created by Winning Moves in 2008.

Showdown has been described as "Trivial Pursuit meets Scrabble" by Peter Sterling, Puzzles Editor for the Press Association.

== How to Play ==
Play begins when one player draws a Topic Card from the deck, and reads out the five topics on it. They range from general knowledge topics (a European country) to popular culture (a James Bond character) to the everyday (something found in a bathroom).

Players have two minutes to come up with an answer to each of the five topics, keeping in mind that if they come up with the same answer as another player, both will score 0 points. They also bear in mind the Summit scoring system, in which each letter A is worth 1 point, B is worth 2, C worth 3, up to Z which is worth 26. Other characters such as punctuation and spaces are ignored. For example, the band ABBA scores 6 points whereas ZZ Top scores 103.

When the time is up, players with a valid answer for a topic can choose whether to go “in” or “out” depending on whether they feel they have a high-scoring, unique answer or not. If a player chooses “out”, they bank 5 points.

Once everyone has announced “in” or “out”, everyone's answers are revealed. If one or more players have chosen “in” and have the same answer, they are knocked out and score 0. If a player has chosen “in” and has a unique answer, they can bank 10 points.

Now that everyone knows the other players’ answers, players must decide whether to enter The Showdown to try to win the maximum 20 points for that topic. The Showdown is where the Summit scoring system comes into play; the highest scoring word in The Showdown wins, and anyone losing The Showdown scores 0. Players announce “in” or “out” again, with players going “out” at this stage scoring 10 points.

If two or more players go “in” to The Showdown, the scores are calculated and the highest-scoring answer wins 20 points. If only one player is willing to enter The Showdown (for example, if everyone thinks that one player's answer is clearly much better than all the others) then that person automatically wins the 20 points. If two or more players have an equal Summit score (for example, the musicals My Fair Lady and Calamity Jane both score 114), then both players win 20 points for that topic.

The player with the most points after the 5 topics wins the game.

== Strategy ==
There are several strategies that can be used to win Showdown.

=== Unique answers ===
It is possible to win the game without ever entering The Showdown itself, simply by coming up with unique answers and banking 10 points for each topic. For example, if the topic is Football Clubs, a player might choose Leeds United (118) over answers such as Wycombe Wanderers (193) or Wolverhampton Wanderers (289), in the knowledge that whilst Leeds United scores less, other players are unlikely to choose it for exactly that reason and therefore it is probable that it will be a unique answer.

=== Bluff ===
Players can attempt to deceive their opponents by bluffing. This can either be in feigning confidence in the score of their answer before the actual score has been calculated, in an attempt to scare other players out of the game, or in feigning a lack of confidence in an attempt to suck other players into a Showdown and defeat them that way.

=== Risk taking ===
As players are generally likely to choose a unique answer, players willing to take a risk can attempt a double bluff and choose an extremely obvious answer in the chance that other players have avoided it for that reason. For example, if the topic is Countries of the World, United States of America is an obviously high-scoring answer (228) because of its length and the number of high-scoring Ss and Ts. But because it is so obvious, players may avoid it because it is unlikely to be unique. This affords a brave player the opportunity to take a risk on both a unique and high-scoring answer.

== Gameplay variation ==
Showdown can also be played where players are attempting to get a low-scoring answer rather than a high-scoring one. For example, in this variation, a Hot Drink topic would see Tea (26) beating Coffee (40).

== Online Textulator ==
The Showdown website allows visitors to type in any answer and instantly calculate their scores, which can be used both while playing the game and to allow fans to compare the scores of anything from the names of their family members to the names of football players to try to find out what has the highest value.
