= Tumbbad (soundtrack) =

2018 soundtrack albums

The music for the 2018 Hindi-language period horror film Tumbbad features one song composed by Ajay–Atul and written by Raj Shekhar, whereas the original score was composed by Danish musician Jesper Kyd. Tumbbad was directed by Rahi Anil Barve, with Adesh Prasad as the co-director and Anand Gandhi as the creative director. The film was produced by Aanand L. Rai's Colour Yellow Productions and Sohum Shah under his Sohum Shah Films banner, distributed by Eros International and stars Shah in the lead role.

Ajay–Atul's original song "Tumbbad Title Track" (also known as "The Tumbbad Anthem") was released on 11 October 2018, a day prior to the film's release. Kyd's score was released as a 22-track album on 9 November 2018. The music received positive reviews from critics with Kyd receiving a nomination for Filmfare Award for Best Background Score.

== Original score ==
Tumbbad (Original Soundtrack)

Film score by Jesper Kyd
- Released: 9 November 2018
- Recorded: 2018
- Genre: Film score
- Length: 51:22
- Label: Sohum Shah Music
- Producer: Jesper Kyd

Jesper Kyd chronology
| State of Decay 2 (Original Game Soundtrack) (2018) | Tumbbad (Original Soundtrack) (2018) | Borderlands 3 (Original Soundtrack) (2019) |

=== Development ===
Tumbbad's original score was composed by Danish musician-sound designer Jesper Kyd. The film's co-director Adesh Prasad was sampling music pieces from several composers when he heard the soundtrack "Apocalypse" from the video game Hitman: Blood Money (2006) composed by Kyd and decided to work with him. Kyd watched the rough cuts of the film, provided by Prasad, and was blown away with the "very strong visuals and great performances by the cast" complimenting the team's passion and efforts on making this film. He admitted that "the images and visuals have so much depth and the music had to reflect that" resulting in a lot of experimentation and should have serious notes with a lot of weight.

Kyd felt the Tumbbad team wanted the soundtrack to be between a western and an Indian sound. As he was new to Indian musical profiles and instruments, he had to experiment a lot that changed his musical style. Moreover, there was no temp tracks as placeholders resulting Kyd to work on the film's music from the ground level itself. However, Prasad provided him a sample of Laxmikant–Pyarelal's track from Ram Lakhan (1989) for reference; whereas Kyd also watched videos of street drummers and The Sinful Dwarf (1973). Both Prasad and Kyd used to interact with each other through Skype despite the time constraints, exchanging ideas and notes.

Kyd made three different types of sound for the film's three parts. The first part of the film played more like a period horror film that resulted in Kyd approaching with realistic instruments, focusing on musique concrète; the instruments used were mostly objects made of wood, metal and clay that he played and processed in multiple ways which provided an organic and realistic atmosphere. Kyd used several instruments—both traditional and ethnic—played in odd ways, such as cello bows playing guitars and the sounds of cimbalom being tweaked and recorded multiple times until the final rendition of it served as the main musical theme; ethnic instruments such as zithers, dulcimers, prepared piano were combined on Eurorack synthesizers. Other anlaog synths used are Yahama CS-80, Prophet 10 and the Roland VP-330.

The second part focused on the mythodology of Tumbbad. The track "Descending" was the first piece which he wrote for the film. The cue involves a 14-piece Bulgarian choir recording the piece live. "The Greed Manifests" was composed for the music on the river sequence, which Kyd described it as 'battle music' and includes motor guitars and live percussions. The opening piece originally started as an 18-minute-long track, as Kyd experimented on finding the sounds of rain, and relied heavily on analog synths and EDM ambient-type music. The third part featured a more intimate style using solo instruments and melodic structural writing. The score involved live recording with cello and violin as well as the real sound of crickets. During post-production, the film was mixed in 5.1 surround sound. The album consists of 22 tracks and was released on 9 November 2018.

=== Track listing ===
| No. | Title | Length |
|---|---|---|
| 1. | "The Birth of Hastar" | 3:12 |
| 2. | "Rains of Tumbbad" | 2:16 |
| 3. | "Grandmother's Meal" | 1:53 |
| 4. | "Secrets" | 2:30 |
| 5. | "Feeding the Witch" | 3:50 |
| 6. | "Opportunities" | 2:03 |
| 7. | "The Greed Manifests" | 2:47 |
| 8. | "Descending" | 2:54 |
| 9. | "The Wife" | 1:06 |
| 10. | "The Box is Opened" | 1:25 |
| 11. | "Hastar" | 4:32 |
| 12. | "Happy Ever After" | 2:30 |
| 13. | "Telefon" | 1:02 |
| 14. | "Driving in the Rain" | 1:51 |
| 15. | "The Initiation" | 2:16 |
| 16. | "Chocolate Coins" | 1:32 |
| 17. | "The Mistress" | 0:35 |
| 18. | "Vinayak's Treasure Box" | 1:30 |
| 19. | "Family Business" | 3:05 |
| 20. | "The Showdown" | 3:17 |
| 21. | "The Final Choice" | 1:56 |
| 22. | "The Goddess" | 3:10 |
| Total length: | | 51:22 |

=== Reception ===
Rachit Gupta of The Times of India noted "Jesper Kyd’s soundtrack also adds to the proverbial terror". Udita Jhunjhunwala of Mint noted "Jesper Kyd’s music underscores the sense of foreboding that laces the entire saga". Subhash K. Jha of Sify noted that "[Jesper Kyd's] background score is so evocative and articulate—easily the best I've heard in a recent Indian film." (Note: Mistakenly mentioned Ajay–Atul for the background score) Joginder Tuteja of Bollywood Hungama noted that Kyd's background score "is brilliant and has an international feel."

=== Accolades ===
| Year | Award | Category | Recipient(s) | Result | Ref. |
|---|---|---|---|---|---|
| 2019 | Critics Choice Film Awards | Best Background Score | Jesper Kyd | Won | |
| 2019 | Filmfare Awards | Best Sound Design | Kunal Sharma | Won | |
| 2019 | Filmfare Awards | Best Background Score | Jesper Kyd | Nominated | |
| 2019 | FOI Online Awards | Best Sound Design | Kunal Sharma | Nominated | |
| 2019 | FOI Online Awards | Best Background Score | Jesper Kyd | Nominated | |
| 2019 | International Indian Film Academy Awards | Best Sound Recording | Kunal Sharma | Won | |

== Original song ==
Tumbbad features only one original song: the title track—also known as "The Tumbbad Anthem"—composed by the duo Ajay–Atul with lyrics written by Raj Shekhar. Shekhar revealed that he was not in favor of the use of Sanskrit words—a decision made by one of the producers, Aanand L. Rai, but later knew that the team were in search of the hymns. This provided him the opportunity to explore the core emotions of the characters via this song and could thereby simplify the viewing experience for the audience, adding that "my words could reveal his way of thinking. As far as the musical technicalities are concerned, this movie is about one’s greed for gold. Gold has a metallic sound, so I used rounded and metallic [motifs] for this track. Vinayak is one who is blessed with everything but still lacks something in his life. I wanted to [play the role of a mediator] and lyrically showcase his emotions."

The song was released digitally through Eros Music on 11 October 2018. A remixed version of the song was released on 27 September 2024, two weeks after the film's re-release.
