= Showdown cooperative learning =

Showdown is a cooperative learning technique that allows students to work in a group. It is usually used in middle school classrooms.

== Process ==
Students in groups of three or four receive a task card with specific problems from the chapter they are learning about. The team leader of the group picks up the card and reads the sentence on it aloud without showing it to the others. Other team members write the answers on their paper or chalkboards. When the teacher gives the showdown signal, all the members reveal their responses at once. If everyone gets the same answer they can assume the answer is correct. If not, all members need to discuss to see if someone did something wrong and help that student to see what they did wrong. For the next task card, a different student on the team becomes the leader. The teacher monitors the activity to make sure students are getting the correct answers.

== Advantages claimed for Showdown ==
- It gives opportunity to the individual to expertise their ideas.
- It is easy to perform in a class as it takes less time.
