= Ra Chapman =

Australian actress

Ra Chapman is a Korean-born Australian film, television and theatre actress and playwright. She appeared in Wentworth as Kim Chang.

== Early life ==
Chapman was born in South Korea and was adopted by Australian parents in 1985.

== Career ==
From 2013 to 2017, Chapman portrayed Kim Chang in the Australian television series Wentworth.

She won the 2020 Patrick White Playwrights' Award for her play, K-BOX.

In 2023 Chapman appeared in Night Bloomers, Chapman also wrote and will star in upcoming ABC show White Fever. Chapman wrote and developed White Fever after penning a play at the Malthouse Theatre.

On 11 July 2024, Chapman was named for Stan Australia series Sunny Nights.

== Filmography ==
=== Film ===
Year	Title	Role	Notes
2007	Prologue	Forensic Officer	Short film
2009	Knowing	Jessica	Feature film
2009	Birthday	Cindy	
2011	Face to Face	Theresa Martin	Feature film
2013	Between the Lines	Angel	Short film
2013	Bo Mi	Bo Mi	Short film
2014	Turkey Shoot	Kintay	Feature film
2015	Nothing to Declare	Samira	Short film
2017	Potcheski Bot	The Witch	Short film
2020	The Fox	Su	Short film
2022	Slant	Olyvia	Feature film

=== Television ===
Year	Title	Role	Notes
2009	City Homicide	Destiny	1 episode
2009	John Safran's Race Relations	Deborah (re-enactment)	1 episode
2011	SLiDE	Doctor Zen	1 episode
2012	Woodley		2 episodes
2013	A Wise Man?	Felicity Yau	TV movie
2013–2017	Wentworth	Kim Chang	Recurring role, 37 episodes
2015–2016	Neighbours	Michelle Kim	Recurring role, 20 episodes
2015	Footballer Wants a Wife	Hope	5 episodes
2015	Sweatshop	Lena Lee	TV movie
2016	Offspring	Tanya	1 episode
2017	Other People's Problems	Aggie	1 episode
2019	Get Krack!n	Elise	Episodes: 2.4
2020	AussieWood	Alexis Chan	
2020	Five Bedrooms	Guest role	Episodes: 2.1
2021	Why Are You Like This	Alma Chen	Episodes: 1.6
2023	Night Bloomers	Sophie	1 episode
2024	White Fever	Jane	6 episodes
2025	Sunny Nights	Joyce	

==== Writing ====
Year	Title	Role	Notes
2023	Night Bloomers	Writer	1 episode
2024	White Fever	Writer/creator	6 episodes

== Theatre ==
In 2022 Chapman would appear in K-BOX at the Malthouse.

Year	Title	Role	Notes	Ref
2022	K-BOX	Lucy	Malthouse Theatre	
2021	Because the Night		Malthouse Theatre (text crew)	
2020	The Lockdown Monologues		Malthouse Theatre (director)	
