= Libby Tanner =

Australian actress and theater director (born 1970)

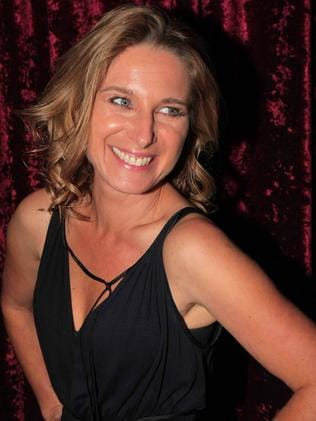
- Born: Elizabeth Joan Tanner; February 25, 1970 (age 56); Melbourne, Victoria, Australia
- Occupation: Actress
- Years active: 1992–present
- Notable work: All Saints (1998–2003); Wentworth (2015–2018)
- Children: 3

Elizabeth Tanner (born 1970) is an Australian stage and television actress best known for her roles as Bronwyn Craig in the television series All Saints and as Bridget Westfall in Wentworth.

== Early life ==
Tanner grew up in Victoria, Australia, graduating from the University of Ballarat in 1993, with a Bachelor of Performing Arts. She has an older brother.

== Career ==
Tanner began her career in theatre and made several guest appearances on Victorian based productions before landing her first big role as Zoe Marshall in the short lived Channel 9 soap Pacific Drive from 1996 to 1997.

Tanner then moved to Sydney to pursue more acting opportunities and in 1998, began starring in the hospital drama All Saints as Bronwyn (Bron) Craig until she exited the series in 2003. Tanner's character was well received during her time on the show, winning Logie Awards for her role in 2002 and 2003.

In 2004, after returning to Victoria, she starred in the short lived television series Fireflies and then the Australian drama series headLand from 2005 to 2006. From 2009 to 2011 she starred as Michelle LeTourneau in Rescue: Special Ops. In 2015 Tanner was announced for series three of Australian prison drama Wentworth, playing forensic psychologist Bridget Westfall. She appeared from seasons three to six, departing the series in 2018, Tanner has since appeared regularly at Wentworth fan conventions in the UK and US. In 2020, Tanner was announced as part of the cast for Amazon Prime series Back to the Rafters. Tanner has her own theatre company, 'Mad as Us'.

== Awards ==
During her run on All Saints, she gained a total of seven Logie nominations in categories including Most Popular New Female Talent and Most Outstanding Actress and Best Personality on Australian Television. Tanner won Most Popular Actress Logie Awards in 2002 and 2003 for her role as Bron.

== Personal life ==
Tanner was previously in a relationship with All Saints co-star Brian Vriends with whom she shares a daughter. She has two other children.

She currently resides in Ballarat, Victoria.

== Filmography ==
=== Film ===
Year	Title	Role	Notes
1996	Life	Jane	Feature film
2008	Little Wings	Claire	Short film
2011	These Empty Streets	Susie	Short film
2013	The Turning	Gail Lang	Anthology film, segment: "Damaged Goods"
2016	Nowhere Boys: The Book of Shadows	Sarah Riles	Feature film

=== Television ===
Year	Title	Role	Notes	Ref
1992	Bony	Jenny	TV series, episode: "Surf, Sun, Sand.... and Murder"	
1993; 1994	Neighbours	Kay / Lynette Thorneycroft	TV series, 6 episodes	
1994; 1995	Blue Heelers	Heather / Holly McLeod	TV series, 2 episodes: "Nowhere to Run" / "Motherlove"	
1995	Frontline	Patient	TV series, episode: "Office Mole"	
1995	The Man from Snowy River	Brodie	TV series, episode: "The Foundling"	
1996	Pacific Drive	Zoe Marshall	TV series, 17 episodes	
1998–2003	All Saints	Bronwyn Craig	TV series, seasons 1–6, 219 episodes (main role)	
2003	Stingers	Ava Ryan	TV series, episode: "Sleeping with the Enemy"	
2004	Fireflies	Lill Yengill	TV movie (main role)	
2004	Rapid Response	Sergeant Jessica Mack	TV pilot (unaired) (main role)	
2005–2006	headLand	Grace Palmer	TV series, 58 episodes (main role)	
2006	BlackJack: At the Gates	Stephanie Turner	TV film	
2008	Scorched	Lizzie Francia	TV movie	
2008	Scorched	Lizzie Francia	TV series, 22 episodes	
2008	Rush	Robyn Hume	TV series, episode: "1.8"	
2009–2011	Rescue: Special Ops	Michelle Letourneau	TV series, 48 episodes (main role)	
2012	Mrs Biggs	Norma	TV miniseries, 2 episodes	
2013–2016	Nowhere Boys	Sarah Riles	TV series, seasons 1–2, 13 episodes	
2016	Nowhere Boys: The Book of Shadows	Sarah Riles	TV movie	
2015–2018	Wentworth	Bridget Westfall	TV series, seasons 3–6, 33 episodes	
2019	Ms Fisher's Modern Murder Mysteries	Florence Astor	TV series, 1 episode: "Just Murdered"	
2021	Wentworth: The Fall Girl	Bridget Westfall	Podcast series, 8 episodes	
2021	Fisk	Annabelle	TV series, 1 episode: "Portrait of a Lady"	
2021	Back to the Rafters	Tessa Blake	TV series, 5 episodes	
2025	Neighbours	Yvette Ramsay	Guest role: 2 episodes	

== Theatre ==
Year	Title	Role	Company	Ref
1994	Cuckoo	Lead	Victorian regional tour with Barnstorm Theatre Company	
1994	Rebellion: Inca Eureka	Lead	Barnstorm Theatre Company	
	Emerald City	Helen	Queensland Theatre Company	
1999	Art of Penetration	Lead	Belvoir Street Theatre	
2013	Burning	June Matthews	Mad as Us	
2015	Abigail's Party	Bev	Mad as Us / Geelong Production Company	
2024	Between the Sheets	Lead	UK / US / AUS Tour	
