= Sally-Anne Upton =

British–Australian actress

Sally-Anne Upton is a British–Australian stage, film and television actress. Upton is known for her roles in Bring Her Back, Neighbours, and as Lucy Gambaro in prison drama Wentworth.

== Personal life ==
Upton has served on the committee of the Victorian Actors Benevolent Trust (VABT), and is also an ambassador for WomenCan. Upton is a registered civil marriage celebrant and registered nurse, and has served as a unit nurse on the television soap Neighbours.

== Career ==
In 2016, Upton was announced in the returning cast for the upcoming fourth season of the prison drama Wentworth. Upton appeared in the fifth season of the series and her character Lucy would ultimately lose her tongue as it was cut out by Joan Ferguson, Upton has said that particular scene took seven hours to shoot.

In 2019, Upton would appear in a recurring capacity on the soap Neighbours as the character of Vera Punt and has made on and off appearances in the show for the following years. In 2022, Upton would appear in ABC drama Savage River.

In 2024, Upton was announced as part of the cast for the film Bring Her Back (2025), directed and written by Danny and Michael Philippou.

In 2025, Upton was announced as lead for the Heath Ledger Theatre Christmas play Carol. On 6 December 2025, Upton was nominated for an AACTA Award for her role in Bring Her Back.

== Filmography ==
=== Television ===
Year	Title	Role	Notes	Ref
2019-2025	Neighbours	Vera Punt	Recurring	
2023	Aunty Donna's Coffee Cafe	Sally-Anne	4 episodes	
2023	Crazy Fun Park	Dawn	2 episodes	
2022	Fisk	Betty	1 episode	
2022	Savage River	Dale O'Neill	6 episodes	
2017-21	Superwog	Charlene	2 episodes	
2018-20	How to Stay Married	Leonie	2 episodes	
2019	Aunty Donna: Glenridge Secondary College	Principal	1 episode	
2018	Legends	Mrs Knee	4 episodes	
2015-2018	Wentworth	Lucy Gambaro	32 episodes	
2017	True Story w/ Hamish and Andy	Marg	1 episode	
2017	House Husbands	Suzy	1 episode	
2016	Under The Milky Way	Rose	4 episodes	
2015	Fresh Blood; Pilot Season	Patsy	1 episode	
2015	Sammy J & Randy	Smilté	1 episode	
2013	Miss Fisher's Murder Mysteries	Sister Dominicia	1 episode	
2013	It's a Date	Brenda	1 episode	
2011	Winners & Losers	Lyn	1 episode	
2008	Bogan Pride	Berenice Craig	6 episodes	
2007	The Librarians	Sister Gregory	3 episodes	
2001	Stingers	Patient	1 episode	
1994-98	Blue Heelers	Sheryl / Rita	2 episodes	
1998	Good Guys Bad Guys	Biff	1 episode	
1997	The Ripper	Bartender	TV movie	
1996	The Genie from Down Under	Hairdresser	1 episode	
1996	The Dame Was Loaded	Meg	Video game	
1995	The Feds: Suspect	Neighbour	TV movie	
1994	Law of the Land	Beryl	1 episode	
1994	The Damnation of Harvey McHugh	Edwina	1 episode	
1993	Stark	Barmaid	1 episode	
1993	Snowy	Cook	1 episode	
1992-93	Bingles	Deidre	23 episodes	
1993	Phoenix	Woman	1 episode	
1992	Boys from the Bush	Nestie	1 episode	
1991	Col'n Carpenter	Policewoman	1 episode	
1990	Skirts	Jenny Kruger	14 episodes	

=== Film ===
Year	Title	Role	Notes	Ref
2025	The Kink	TBA	Film	
2025	Bring Her Back	Wendy	Film	
2020	The Very Excellent Mr. Dundee	Luke's Mum	Film	
2013	Lake Breeze	Mrs Eden	Short	
2010	I Love You Too	Trish		
2006	Wil	God		
2003	Take Away	Innkeeper		
2000	Muggers	Cafeteria Assistant		
1995	Angel Baby	Clubhouse Client		
1990	Aya	Pushy Woman		
