= Shareena Clanton =

Australian actress

- Born: Perth, Western Australia, Australia
- Education: Western Australian Academy of Performing Arts (2010)
- Occupation: Actress
- Years active: 2009–present
- Known for: Nowhere Boys; Wentworth

Shareena Clanton is an Australian film, television and theatre actress. She is known for her role as Doreen Anderson in the television drama series Wentworth (2013–2017).

== Early life and education ==
Clanton was born in Perth, Western Australia. She is of Wangkatha, Yamatji, Noongar, and Gidja descent through her mother and Cherokee, Blackfoot and African-American descent through her father.

She first studied an Aboriginal Theatre course at the Western Australian Academy of Performing Arts (WAAPA) in 2006, before being accepted into the full-time acting course at WAAPA, from which she graduated in 2010.

== Career ==
In 2009, before graduating from WAAPA, Clanton had her feature film debut playing Leah in the stoner comedy Stone Bros., before becoming a main cast member in the sketch comedy variety series Ben Elton Live from Planet Earth in 2011.

In theatre, Clanton starred in a main stage performance for the first time in a 2011 production of Alan Ayckbourn's My Wonderful Day at Sydney's Ensemble Theatre. This was followed by playing Adrianna in a season of The Comedy of Errors and Ariel in The Tempest with the Shakespeare WA.

Clanton has starred in numerous television series, including a 2012 episode of Indigenous drama Redfern Now. She then landed an ongoing role in prison drama Wentworth from 2013 to 2017, as Doreen Anderson, an Aboriginal woman from an inner city community wracked by drugs, alcohol and abuse. She was the youngest member of the main cast and her performance saw her nominated for Most Outstanding Newcomer at the Logie Awards in 2014.

In 2019, Clanton made her directorial debut with Ilbijerri Ensemble's production of Conversations with the Dead at Melbourne's Arts Centre.

In 2021, Clanton was announced to appear as Sheila Canning 2 in the soap opera Neighbours. Prior to her first on-screen appearance on the show, Clanton made public her displeasure about working on the show due to racism. According to Clanton, an unnamed cast member taunted her about her ethnicities twice and was not only defended by another cast member, but Clanton's rebuke of the actor resulted in Clanton being told she made the other cast members "uncomfortable". In the weeks that followed, Fremantle Australia began an investigation into these allegations, and at the same time, former cast members Sharon Johal, Meyne Wyatt, Remy Hii, Menik Gooneratne, and Sachin Joab also came forward with allegations of racism. The investigation into the racism scandal was concluded in late 2021, but the findings were not made public.

Clanton appeared as Valerie in seven episodes of 2022 miniseries Joe vs. Carole which was based on the real life story of Tiger King personalities, Joe Exotic and Carole Baskin. That same year, Clanton voiced the character of Deb in the animated series Childish Deano.

In 2023, Clanton played the role of Ruby, a ranger who becomes the main character's friend, in the award-winning miniseries The Lost Flowers of Alice Hart on Amazon Prime Video. She subsequently appeared in the 2024 second season of The Twelve on Foxtel. She was later named as part of the cast for 2025 Stan series Invisible Boys. going on to play the role of Karla Hammersmith.

== Other activities ==
In February 2018 Clanton appeared on an episode of the ABC Television show Q+A, where she said Indigenous voices deserved a place in parliament.

== Recognition and awards ==
Year	Work	Award	Category	Result	Ref
2011	My Wonderful Day	Sydney Theatre Awards	Best Newcomer	Nominated	
2012	Redfern Now	AACTA Awards	Best Guest or Supporting Actress in a Television Drama	Nominated	
2014	Wentworth	Logie Awards	Graham Kennedy Award for Most Outstanding New Newcomer	Nominated	
2014	Wentworth	ASTRA Awards	Best New Talent	Nominated	
2025	Shareena Clanton	Solid Screen Awards	Solid Contribution to Screen Culture Award	Honoured	

== Credits ==
=== Film ===
Year	Title	Role	Notes	Ref
2009	Stone Bros.	Leah	Feature film	
2010	On a Break	Donna	Short film	
2015	Last Cab to Darwin	Sally	Feature film	
2017	Mrs McCutcheon	Ange	Short film	
2018	30 Minutes of Danger	Police Detective	Short film	

=== Television ===
Year	Title	Role	Notes	Ref
2011	Rescue: Special Ops	Prisoner 1	Season 3, episode 12: "Break Out"	
2012	Redfern Now	Lilly	Season 1, episode 1: "Family"	
2013	Miss Fisher's Murder Mysteries	Lena	Season 2, episode 1: "Murder Most Scandalous"	
2013–2017	Wentworth	Doreen Anderson	53 episodes (main role)	
2016	Ash vs Evil Dead	Deputy Polly	Season 2, episode 5: "Confinement"	
2016–2018	Nowhere Boys: Two Moons Rising	Sonia Jarra	14 episodes (supporting role)	
2017	Aussie Rangers	Regina	Miniseries	
2017; 2018	True Story with Hamish & Andy	Officer Miles / Nurse Alex	2 episodes	
2018	The Cry	Detective Lorna Jones	Miniseries, 4 episodes (main role)	
2019	Rosehaven	Suzanne	Season 3, 2 episodes	
2019	Glitch	Elena Triggs	Season 3, episode 3: "First Times"	
2021	Neighbours	Sheila Canning 2	18 episodes (guest role)	
2021	Fires	Aunt Rose	2 episodes	
2022	Joe vs. Carole	Valerie	Miniseries, 7 episodes	
2022	Childish Deano	Deb (voice)	Animated series, 2 episodes	
2023	The Lost Flowers of Alice Hart	Ruby	Miniseries, 3 episodes	
2024	The Twelve	Kora Gardner	Season 2, 6 episodes	
2024	Last Days of the Space Age	Djinda	2 episodes	
2025	Invisible Boys	Karla Hammersmith	7 episodes	

=== Other appearances ===
Year	Title	Role	Notes	Ref
2011	Ben Elton Live from Planet Earth	Self	3 episodes	
2016	An Audience with the cast of Wentworth	Self	TV special	
2018	The Good Thief	Self	Podcast, 1 episode	
2018	Q+A	Panelist	1 episode	
2019	Smart Arts	Self	Podcast, 1 episode	
2020	MTC Audio Lab: The Age of Ignorance is Over	Self	Podcast, 1 episode	

=== Theatre ===
==== As performer ====
Year	Title	Role	Notes	Ref
2011	My Wonderful Day	Laverne	Ensemble Theatre, Sydney	
2012	The Comedy of Errors	Adrianna	Shakespeare WA	
2012	The Tempest	Ariel	Shakespeare WA	
2013	White Rabbit, Red Rabbit		Malthouse Theatre, Melbourne	
2014	Hipbone Sticking Out	Mavis	Playhouse, Melbourne with Big hART	
2015	Battle of Waterloo	Sissy	Wharf Theatre, Sydney with STC	
2017	Macbeth	Lady Macduff / Witch 2	Southbank Theatre, Melbourne with MTC	
2021	York	Rosy	Heath Ledger Theatre, Perth with Black Swan Theatre Co & WA Youth Theatre Co	

==== As director ====
Year	Title	Role	Notes	Ref
2019	Conversations with the Dead	Director	Arts Centre Melbourne with Ilbijerri Ensemble	
