= Bessie Holland =

Australian actress

Bessie Holland is an Australian actress, best known for her role as Stella Radic on the prison drama series Wentworth. Holland also plays Tessa in the ABC series Wakefield.

Holland appeared in ABC series The Exhibitionists alongside Bridie Carter, Mandy McElhinney and Veronica Milsom.

On 8 December 2024, Holland was named in the cast for season three of Foxtel legal drama The Twelve. On 20 November 2025, ABC announced that Holland was a part of the cast for its series Treasure & Dirt.

== Filmography ==
Year	Title	Role	Notes
2014–18	Wentworth	Stella Radic	30 episodes
2015	The Beautiful Lie	Bride	Episode: "Episode #1.6"
2018	The True History of Billie The Kid	Mel	Short film
2019	Get Krack!n	Astrid	1 episode
2020	Wakefield	Tessa	7 episodes
2020	The Dry	Sally	
2021,2022	Fisk	Peggy	2 episodes
2022	The Tourist	Andrea	1 episode
2022	Irreverent	Renee	2 episodes
2025	The Twelve	Camilla Jones	TV series; 8 episodes
2025	RFDS	Andrea Purvis	TV series: 1 episode (3.2)
2026	Treasure & Dirt	Carole	TV series
2026	Apex	Cashier	

== Theatre ==
Holland has appeared in numerous theatre productions. Holland appeared in Sydney Theatre Company's Blithe Spirit in 2022.

Year	Title	Role	Note	Ref
2022	Blithe Spirit		Sydney Theatre Co	
2019	Cosi	Cherry	Melbourne Theatre Co	
2018	The House of Bernarda Alba	Magda	Melbourne Theatre Co	
2018	Accidental Death of an Anachist		Sydney Theatre Co	
2016	Blaque Showgirls	Ginny	Malthouse Theatre	
