= Fear Her (Wentworth) =

- Wentworth episode
- Episode no.: Season 2 Episode 12
- Directed by: Kevin Carlin
- Written by: Pete McTighe
- Original air date: 5 August 2014
- Running time: 46 minutes

Guest appearances
- Reef Ireland as Brayden Holt; Georgia Chara as Jess Warner; Socratis Otto as Maxine Conway; Ra Chapman as Kim Chang; Kathryn Beck as Sky Pierson; Luke McKenzie as Nash Taylor

Episode chronology
← Previous "Into The Night"	Next → "The Governor's Pleasure"
- Wentworth season 2

"Fear Her" is the twelfth episode of the second season of the Australian television drama Wentworth, and the twenty-second episode overall. The plot of the episode sees Bea Smith (Danielle Cormack) take her revenge against Brayden Holt (Reef Ireland) after escaping from the hospital during the previous episode. Other storylines focus on Franky Doyle's (Nicole da Silva) downfall as top dog, Doreen Anderson (Shareena Clanton) telling Nash Taylor (Luke McKenzie) about their baby, and Liz Birdsworth (Celia Ireland) being re-arrested after being found in possession of a murder weapon.

== Plot ==
The episode begins with Bea waking up at her daughter's grave. Bea then walks into town and does her best to blend in within everyone around her and not draw attention to herself. Meanwhile Will and Joan talk over the phone about Bea. Joan tells Will not to come back until he finds her. Joan then questions Franky, Doreen, Maxine, Jess and other prisoners about what they know about Bea's plans. Vera then comes in with Bea's phone records and details about Bea sending Liz a package.

In the locker room, Linda and Fletch talk about his impending transfer to another prison. Vera comes in and demands that he goes and speaks with Ferguson. Fletch is then interrogated about how his swipe card got into Bea's hands. Fletch defends himself against Joan. Vera tries to defend Fletch but Ferguson does not care.

Sky is in the prison exercise yard talking about Bea's escape to Boomer and Franky. Franky calls Bea a coward. Franky wants to teach Maxine a lesson but Boomer informs Franky that nobody will fight for her anymore. Kim visits Franky in her cell and informs her that her parole has been approved. Franky tells Kim to leave her.

Fletch sees that inmate Kelly is being transferred and he tries to stop it. He gets into the prison van and tells the driver to drive.

Meanwhile Bea goes to visit Liz at the halfway house. Liz is surprised to see Bea outside of the prison. Liz tries to stop Bea from going after Brayden by telling her that she got rid of it. Bea does not believe her. Liz helps Bea get away when the police come to interview Liz.

Fletch learns that Ferguson physically assaults inmates to silence them. Kelly then tells Fletch about Jianna and Ferguson. Fletch then realises that Ferguson also has it in for Will. Fletch tried to call Will but the call was rejected. Fletch confronts Ferguson about everything he learned. Fletch was recording their whole conversation. Joan has Fletch escorted out of the prison.

Doreen hears Nash yelling for her from outside and she exposes that she is having his baby and he is very pleased. Will meets with Liz and learns of Bea's plans, but he then lies to Ferguson about where she is going. Ferguson has Vera back her up that Jackson and Bea are in a relationship. Fletch goes to Will's house to try and warn him, but he is struck by a van.

Bea finds her way to Brayden's work shop, she witnesses Brayden trying to inject Carly Slater and points a gun at Brayden and lets Carly leave. Will then comes in shortly after and talks Bea out of shooting Brayden. Brayden then smirks after Bea drops the gun, Bea shoots him in the head. Will and Bea go peacefully out to the police where both of them are arrested.

The prisoners watch on TV about everything that has happened while police come and arrest Liz. Boomer is shocked when they see that Will was also arrested. Bea is returned to the prison where she addresses Joan as Freak. Franky tells everybody in H Block that Bea is top dog now.

== Reception ==
This episode was nominated for an award from Australian Writers Guild.

A review from AfterEllen states "HOLY SHIT THAT WAS AWESOME. After a season of dreary disappointment, the Season 2 finale reminded me why I went from writing a one-off review of this obscure Australian drama to emailing Karman Kregloe to say, "This is the best show I've ever seen and I am doing full recaps." It had twists, action, drama, AND EVEN JOY (what a concept). Now my greatest hope is that Wentworth can maintain this energy and dynamism for its third season.""

=== Ratings ===
This episode received 103,000 in overnight ratings.
