= Wentworth season 2 =

Wentworth
- Season 2
- Region 4 DVD Cover
- Starring: Danielle Cormack; Nicole da Silva; Pamela Rabe
- No. of episodes: 12

Release
- Original network: SoHo
- Original release: 20 May – 5 August 2014

Season chronology
- ← Previous; Season 1 Next → Season 3

The second season of the crime drama television series Wentworth premiered on SoHo in Australia on May 20, 2014. It was executively produced by Fremantle Media's director of drama, Jo Porter. The season consisted of 12 episodes.

== Cast ==
=== Regular ===
- Danielle Cormack as Bea Smith
- Nicole da Silva as Franky Doyle
- Kate Atkinson as Deputy Governor Vera Bennett
- Celia Ireland as Liz Birdsworth
- Shareena Clanton as Doreen Anderson
- Aaron Jeffery as Matthew "Fletch" Fletcher
- Robbie Magasiva as Will Jackson
- Katrina Milosevic as Sue "Boomer" Jenkins
- Pamela Rabe as Governor Joan Ferguson

=== Recurring ===
- Socratis Otto as Maxine Conway
- Georgia Chara as Jess Warner
- Ally Fowler as Simone "Simmo" Slater
- Kathryn Beck as Sky Pierson
- Jacquie Brennan as Linda Miles
- Reef Ireland as Brayden Holt
- Ra Chapman as Kim Chang
- Luke McKenzie as Nash Taylor
- Maggie Naouri as Rose Atkins
- Steve Le Marquand as Colin Bates
- Tony Briggs as Steve Faulkner
- Kasia Kaczmarek as Lindsay Coulter
- Katherine Halliday as Sarah Briggs
- Alex Menglet as Fencing Master
- Marta Kaczmarek as Marge Plymouth

== Episodes ==
No. overall	No. in season	Title	Directed by	Written by	Original release date	Aus. viewers
11	1	"Born Again"	Kevin Carlin	Pete McTighe	20 May 2014	75,000
Three months after Jacs Holt's death, Bea has been sentenced to twelve years for manslaughter and is confined to the psychiatric ward under heavy sedation. Franky has risen to top dog status and is ruling the compound with notably more malice than before. Erica Davidson has left Wentworth and has been replaced as Governor by Joan Ferguson, a tyrannical and intelligent officer who decides that changes need to be made at Wentworth. When Franky declines Ferguson's offer of an alliance, she becomes fixed on ending Franky's reign. Seeing a potential contender in Bea, Ferguson forces her off the sedatives and returns her to the compound. Bea, consumed with grief realizes that, now is the time to exact her revenge against Brayden Holt for killing her daughter, Debbie.
12	2	"Whatever It Takes"	Kevin Carlin	John Ridley	27 May 2014	99,000
Bea receives a visit from her husband, Harry, who asks for a divorce. Bea refuses unless he helps her exact revenge against Brayden. Bea sets Harry up to meet Brayden and he commits arson against the Holt business in a failed attempt to kill him. A new Korean inmate who doesn't speak English arrives. Kim learns that she had swallowed drugs that the police have yet to discover. Franky refuses to call for help and tries to force her to defecate the heroin out. When the drugs rupture in her digestive system she overdoses and dies. Doreen meets a male prisoner named Nash, who is enlisted on a project to build a garden in Wentworth. Ferguson gets Vera drunk and learns of Fletch's affair with Meg.
13	3	"Boys in the Yard"	Catherine Millar	Timothy Hobart	3 June 2014	95,000
Jacs' second in command; Simmo, returns to prison and starts selling drugs for Brayden. Bea befriends her to lure Brayden into a trap. Franky takes issue with Simmo selling drugs and orders Boomer to break Simmo's kneecaps, but Bea convinces her not to gain Simmo's trust. Bea attacks Brayden when he visits Simmo but fails to kill him. Doreen and Nash grew closer while they care for a sick bird. Franky makes a deal with Bates; one of the male prisoners helping with the gardening project. She had Boomer perform oral sex on him in exchange for setting up a supply route to bring drugs into the prison.
14	4	"The Danger Within"	Catherine Millar	Marcia Gardner	10 June 2014	66,000
Simmo is informed by her husband that Vinnie Holt has hired a hitman to murder Bea as revenge for her attempt on Brayden's life. However, Simmo regards Bea as a friend and warns her. Bea, Doreen, and Liz suspect the hitman to be one of three newly arrived inmates. After confronting Jess Warner, a terrified young woman, Bea deduces the hitman to be Maxine Conway, a new inmate who is a trans woman. Eventually, the hitman turns out to be Kat - a young woman pretending to be injured who attacks Bea in the shower block armed with a knife she hid in her cast. Just as she attempts to make the fatal stab, Bea is saved by Maxine, who knocks out Kat to unconsciousness. Doreen catches Boomer preparing to perform oral sex on Bates and confronts Franky. In exchange for her silence, Franky arranges for Doreen to have time alone with Nash in the garden shed.
15	5	"Twist the Knife"	Dee McLachlan	Pete McTighe	17 June 2014	64,000
Bea learns that Simmo's daughter is working for Brayden and decides to make Simmo paranoid about her daughter's safety by getting Linda to lie to Simmo claiming she saw them together. Franky tries to recruit Maxine into her gang but she refuses. Boomer accidentally locks herself in a laundry chute, causing a prison lock down when they think she has escaped. Fletch comes home and finds that his diary is missing; he assumes that Will stole it. Later, Will comes home and finds that his house was broken into; he assumes that Fletch broke in procuring his diary to find details of his affair with Meg. Will attempts to resign out of fears that he will attack Fletch but Ferguson refuses to accept his resignation. During the prison lockdown, Will violently attacks Fletch in the boiler room after Fletch reveals that Meg was pregnant with his child and decided to have an abortion.
16	6	"The Pink Dragon"	Dee McLachlan	Marcia Gardner	24 June 2014	100,000
Vera struggles to cope with her mother's terminal illness and Ferguson lends her support. While in the garden shed, Bates attempts to rape Franky, and she stabs him in the scrotum with a fork. In the commotion, Boomer retrieves the drug supplies from the project before the officers find them. Vera notices that the blood patterns from when Bates was stabbed are inconsistent, leading her to find the drop box. During a search, Fletch finds the drugs in Boomer's cell, resulting in her being slotted and facing an extended sentence. Simmo's husband insists that she murders Bea as per the instructions by the Holts, otherwise he will be killed. She is reluctant, but out of fear for her family's safety she rigs an electric death trap in Bea's cell. Ferguson, after listening to a conversation between Simmo and her husband is aware of the situation. Ferguson dismantles the trap and poisons Simmo, making it appear that she had overdosed on Franky's 'badly cut' drugs.
17	7	"Metamorphosis"	Pino Amenta	John Ridley	1 July 2014	68,000
Ferguson punishes the entire prison for Franky's drug trafficking by forcing them to watch as the garden project is bulldozed. Doreen is upset when Nash is taken away and later learns that she is pregnant. Maxine receives a visit from her boyfriend's brother, who informs her that Gary is leaving for a job in New Zealand. Maxine attempts to escape Wentworth but her plans are foiled. Meanwhile, Franky accuses Ferguson of killing Simmo and making it look like an overdose. After having enough of her mother's constant verbal abuse, Vera gives her a lethal dose of morphine.
18	8	"Sins of the Mother"	Pino Amenta	Timothy Hobart	8 July 2014	79,000
Franky discovers that Liz informed Ferguson of her drug trafficking and warned her that if she returns to Wentworth she will kill her. Upon her return to work, Vera finds Doreen's pregnancy test in the ruins of the recently destroyed garden and orders urine samples from all the inmates. Jess helps Doreen hide the truth by smuggling her a sample of her own urine. Bea starts to stock up on Marge's blood-clotting medication. Liz is talking with her probation officer in preparation for her release and is told that she needs to contact her family but Liz is reluctant. Ferguson offers Bea a form of alliance; initially reluctant, Bea eventually agrees to help bring Franky down.
19	9	"The Fixer"	Steve Jodrell	John Ridley	15 July 2014	87,000
Bea enlists Maxine's help to infiltrate Franky's gang. Doreen's pregnancy is revealed due to her unknowingly using Maxine's urine, which showed signs of the hormones she was using for her hormone replacement therapy. The situation reminds Ferguson of how she previously looked after a young, pregnant inmate who committed suicide after her newborn baby was taken into care by Will who was a social worker at the time. Ferguson attempts to blackmail Doreen into saying Will is the father and not Nash but she refuses, and Ferguson retaliates by killing her pet bird. Harry visits Wentworth wanting to see Bea and accuses Will of having an affair with her.
20	10	"Jail Birds"	Steve Jodrell	Timothy Hobart	22 July 2014	81,000
Liz is released from prison and moves into a halfway house. Derek Channing plots to remove Ferguson from power and promises Fletch the Governor's job. Ferguson becomes suspicious of Channing's involvement with parole officer Rachel Singer. Through research, Ferguson learns that Channing has been recruiting ex-prisoners to work in an illegal brothel that he is a co-owner of. Ferguson uses this information to get Channing to back off on his investigation and to give a good word to the board on her behalf. Bea informs Ferguson that she will make her bid to become top dog in her own time. Fletch finds Jess crying in the library, and the two became closer.
21	11	"Into the Night"	Kevin Carlin	Adam Todd	29 July 2014	86,000
Bea prepares to put her plan into action and arranges for a package to be sent to Liz. Fletch becomes suspicious of how new inmate Kelly and Ferguson know each other. Bea steals Fletch's access card and steals a box cutter and tape from the mail office. Bea and Franky face off in a knife fight in the laundry and Bea wins. Bea then slits her wrists and is taken to hospital. When Will leaves her unattended she escapes from the hospital. It is then made known that the fight was part of her plan, with her using the blood clotting drugs to prevent herself from bleeding out when she cuts her wrists after learning that regulation dictates, she can't be cuffed with her wrists cut. Back at Liz's place, she opens the package from Bea to find a gun.
22	12	"Fear Her"	Kevin Carlin	Pete McTighe	5 August 2014	103,000
Bea wakes up on Debbie's grave. She looks at it and leaves. Later, she goes to Liz' halfway house. Liz is unsuccessfully tries to talk Bea out of her plan. Later, she arrives at the Holts' garage and held Brayden at gunpoint. While she is about to shoot him, Will arrives and talks Bea out of killing him. But when Brayden smiles mockingly at Bea, she shoots him dead. Doreen tells Nash that she's pregnant. Kelly tells Fletch about Ferguson's affair with an inmate at Blackmoor and Fletch realizes Ferguson's vendetta against Will. Before he can tell anyone, Fletch is run over by a speeding vehicle in front of Will's house, on Ferguson's orders. Liz and Will are arrested for aiding and abetting Bea. Upon her return to Wentworth. Franky concedes the top dog crown, hailing her as "Queen Bea".

== Production ==
Wentworth was commissioned for a second season on 5 June 2013. The executive director of Foxtel Television, Brian Walsh, stated of the renewal, "Wentworth's bold storytelling has attracted a record-breaking response from our Foxtel customers. This drama, tailor-made for Australian subscription television, is capturing local and international attention sparked by its Prisoner heritage." The director of production company, Fremantle Media Australia, and executive producer of Wentworth, Jo Porter, stated, "We have assembled an extraordinary team of writers who can't wait to get started on season two. We have so many more stories to tell."

=== Filming ===
Filming for the 12-part second season began on a purposely built set in Clayton, Victoria, Melbourne on 23 September 2013 and wrapped on 13 February 2014.

=== Crew ===
Amanda Crittenden stayed on as Wentworth's producer. Kevin Carlin and Catherine Millar will return as directors and will be joined by Pino Amenta, Steve Jodrell, and Dee McLachlan. Marcia Gardner will become the script producer and be a part of the writing team alongside Tim Hobart, Pete McTighe, and John Ridley.

=== Casting ===
It was revealed that iconic Prisoner character Joan "The Freak" Ferguson, a sinister prison officer, would be introduced in the second season. Porter commented, "Prisoner offered up a very rich well of amazing characters to draw upon, and the Wentworth writers are very excited about revisiting the character of prison officer Joan 'The Freak' Ferguson in our second season." On 21 September 2013, it was confirmed that Pamela Rabe had been cast as Joan Ferguson.

Kris McQuade (Jacs Holt), Catherine McClements (Meg Jackson), and Leeanna Walsman (Erica Davidson) did not reprise their respective roles for the second season. Katrina Milosevic, who portrays Sue "Boomer" Jenkins, was upgraded to the main cast, as was Rabe.

== Reception ==
=== Ratings ===
No.	Title	Air date	Overnight ratings		Ref(s)
No.	Title	Air date	Viewers	Rank	Ref(s)
1	"Born Again"	20 May 2014	75,000	5	
2	"Whatever It Takes"	27 May 2014	99,000	1	
3	"Boys In The Yard"	3 June 2014	95,000	1	
4	"The Danger Within"	10 June 2014	66,000	3	
5	"Twist The Knife"	17 June 2014	64,000	5	
6	"The Pink Dragon"	24 June 2014	100,000	1	
7	"Metamorphosis"	1 July 2014	68,000	5	
8	"Sins of the Mother"	8 July 2014	79,000	2	
9	"The Fixer"	15 July 2014	87,000	2	
10	"Jail Birds"	22 July 2014	81,000	1	
11	"Into the Night"	29 July 2014	86,000	1	
12	"Fear Her"	5 August 2014	103,000	1	

=== Accolades ===
AACTA Awards (2015)

- Nominated: AACTA Award for Best Lead Actress in a Television Drama — Danielle Cormack (Episode 11: "Into the Night")

ASTRA Awards (2015)

- Won: Most Outstanding Performance by a Female Actor — Danielle Cormack
- Nominated: Most Outstanding Performance by a Female Actor — Celia Ireland
- Nominated: Most Outstanding Performance by a Female Actor — Nicole da Silva
- Nominated: Most Outstanding Performance by a Female Actor — Pamela Rabe
- Nominated: Most Outstanding Performance by a Male Actor — Aaron Jeffery
- Nominated: Most Outstanding Performance by a Male Actor — Robbie Magasiva
- Won: Most Outstanding Drama — Wentworth

Australian Directors Guild (2015)

- Nominated: Best Direction in a TV Drama Series — Kevin Carlin (Episode 11: "Into the Night")

Australian Writers' Guild Awards (2015)

- Nominated: Best Script for a Television Series — Pete McTighe (Episode 12: "Fear Her")

Logie Awards (2015)

- Won: Most Outstanding Drama Series — Wentworth
- Won: Most Outstanding Actress — Danielle Cormack
- Nominated: Most Outstanding Actress — Nicole da Silva

== Home media ==
Title	Release	Country	DVD	Blu-ray	Region	Ref(s)
Wentworth: The Complete Season 2	22 October 2014	Australia	Yes	Yes	4/B	
Wentworth Prison: Season Two	24 November 2014	UK	Yes	No	2	
Wentworth: Season 2	7 March 2017	U.S.	Yes	No	1	
Wentworth: Die Komplette Zweite Staffel	28 April 2017	Germany	Yes	Yes	2/B	
Additional
Distributor: Roadshow Entertainment (Australia); FremantleMedia (United Kingdom); Acorn DVD (United States); WVG Medien (Germany); Set details: 12 episodes; 549 minutes; 1.78:1 aspect ratio; DVD Audio: English: Dolby Digital 5.1 (regions 1, 2 & 4); English: Dolby Digital 2.0 (region 2 Germany); Deutsch: Dolby Digital 2.0 (region 2 Germany); Blu-ray Audio: English: DTS-HD 2.0 (region B Germany); Deutsch: DTS-HD 2.0 (region B Germany); English: DTS-Master Audio 5.1 (Region B Australia); Subtitles: Deutsch (DVD & Blu-ray Germany); Discs: 4-DVD set (region 1); 4-DVD Deluxe Edition set (region 2 UK); 4-DVD set (region 2 Germany); 3-Blu-ray set (Region B Germany); 4-DVD set (Region 4); 3-Blu-ray set (Region B Australia); Rating: ACB: MA15+; BBFC: 18; FSK: 16
