= Wentworth season 3 =

Wentworth
- Season 3
- Region 4 DVD Cover
- Starring: Danielle Cormack; Nicole da Silva; Pamela Rabe
- No. of episodes: 12

Release
- Original network: SoHo
- Original release: 7 April – 23 June 2015

Season chronology
- ← Previous; Season 2 Next → Season 4

The third season of the television drama series Wentworth premiered on SoHo in Australia on 7 April 2015. It was executively produced by FremantleMedia's Director of Drama, Jo Porter. The season comprises 12 episodes. Season three picks up four months after Bea's return to Wentworth following her escape and revenge murder of Brayden Holt.

== Plot ==
Four months have passed since Bea Smith's bold escape and ruthless murder of Brayden Holt. Having returned to Wentworth Correctional Centre, Bea has assumed the mantle of Top Dog, hailed by all – including Franky Doyle herself – as a worthy successor. Franky may no longer be Top Dog but she's not about to forget how Liz lagged on her, and Boomer is set to make Liz pay. Doreen's baby bump is growing and Ferguson is watching her closely. While Vera's instincts are more attuned to Ferguson's scheming, Will is none the wiser despite Fletch's apparent hit and run accident.

== Cast ==
=== Regular ===
- Danielle Cormack as Bea Smith
- Nicole da Silva as Franky Doyle
- Celia Ireland as Liz Birdsworth
- Shareena Clanton as Doreen Anderson
- Aaron Jeffery as Matt "Fletch" Fletcher
- Robbie Magasiva as Will Jackson
- Katrina Milosevic as Sue "Boomer" Jenkins
- Kate Atkinson as Deputy Governor Vera Bennett
- Pamela Rabe as Governor Joan Ferguson

=== Recurring ===
- Socratis Otto as Maxine Conway
- Tammy Macintosh as Kaz Proctor
- Libby Tanner as Bridget Westfall
- Georgia Chara as Jess Warner
- Pia Miranda as Jodie Spiteri
- Ra Chapman as Kim Chang
- Jacquie Brennan as Linda Miles
- Martin Sacks as Derek Channing
- Edwina Samuels as Sophie Donaldson
- Maggie Naouri as Rose Atkins
- Damien Richardson as Detective Michael Mears
- Tony Nikolakopoulos as Nils Jasper
- Alex Menglet as Fencing Master
- Sally-Anne Upton as Lucy "Juice" Gambaro
- Charli Tjoe as Tina Mercado
- Miles Paras as Cindy Lou
- Kasia Kaczmarek as Lindsay Coulter
- Bessie Holland as Stella Radic

== Episodes ==
No. overall	No. in season	Title	Directed by	Written by	Original release date	Aus. viewers
23	1	"The Governor's Pleasure"	Kevin Carlin	Stuart Page	7 April 2015	100,000
Bea is sentenced to life imprisonment without parole for the murder of Brayden Holt, and Ferguson takes the opportunity to let Bea know who's in control. But a defiant Bea fights back and Ferguson responds by slotting Bea. Liz is released from protection, exposing her to a brutal beating from Boomer. Ferguson underestimates Bea, who instigates a riot among the prisoners from her solitary cell. Wentworth is put on lock-down, with Channing on-site, Vera is held hostage by masked prisoners and threatened with a syringe, and the inmates start a bonfire in the exercise yard refusing to talk to the authorities. The prisoners free Bea who joins other inmates in the yard and asks to see the governor. When Ferguson enters the yard, she is surprised seing Bea. Bea tells her that she controls Wentworth.
24	2	"Failing Upwards"	Kevin Carlin	Adam Todd	14 April 2015	94,000
After the riot, Ferguson realise that she must work with Bea and broker a peace arrangement. The two find common ground in wanting to rid the prison of drugs, but Ferguson tells Bea that she wants Franky broken. To assert her authority, Bea doles out a harsh punishment to Boomer (burning her hands) for her bashing of Liz, which causes Boomer to end her friendship with Franky. Liz has a difficult reunion with her daughter, Sophie, and is unsure when Doreen asks her to be her baby's alternate carer. Will seems to finally be able to put the past behind him, only to become the prime suspect of Harry Smith's murder.
25	3	"Knives Out"	Catherine Millar	Pete McTighe	21 April 2015	98,000
Franky is feeling the pinch as her drug supply is cut, and other prisoners demand that she settles her debts. The new psychiatrist, Bridget Westfall, identifies Franky as someone she can help but Franky refuses to engage, plotting to get away from her angry customers by deliberately trashing the Education Unit. While in the slot, Franky overhears an altercation between Ferguson and Jodie Spiteri. Boomer finds a new friend in Maxine. Meanwhile, Bea is concerned with the police's interest in Will over Harry's death, and when she confronts him about it, he makes a startling confession. In an attempt to patch up their friendship, Boomer and Liz are forced by Bea to help one another.
26	4	"Righteous Acts"	Catherine Millar	John Ridley	28 April 2015	102,000
Liz is shocked when Sophie is remanded to Wentworth for a drunken hit-and-run. Franky has commenced her counselling sessions with Bridget and admits her anger over losing the top dog position and hate towards Bea. When Bea is shivved in the yard, Franky comes under suspicion, but, after a visit from Ferguson in medical Bea realizes that Jodie, freshly released from the slot where she was terrorized by Ferguson, was behind the attack. Kaz Proctor, a violent vigilante obsessed with women's rights, publicly declares Bea as her personal hero and requests to visit her at Wentworth.
27	5	"Mercy"	Steve Jodrell	Adam Todd	5 May 2015	97,000
Fletch returns to work at Wentworth. Bea plans to use Jodie Spiteri to get rid of Ferguson. Bea is later visited by Kaz Proctor, who she suspects is a member of the violent vigilante group, The Red Right Hand, and Bea begins to wonder if Kaz and her group killed Harry. Doreen worries over the welfare of her unborn child but Jess offers her support. Sophie continues to idolize Franky, much to Liz's despair, and when Liz finally confronts Franky, it is revealed this is not Sophie's first offence. Jodie reveals that Ferguson physically, sexually, and psychologically tortured her during her time in the slot.
28	6	"Evidence"	Steve Jodrell	Stuart Page	12 May 2015	118,000
Channing tells Vera that Ferguson refused to help her during the riot, and things look bleak for Will when Kaz plants the murder weapon on his property. Ferguson is blindsided by Jodie's complaint to the ombudsman, to which her accusations of abuse could end her career. When Ferguson realises that Bea is behind the plan to oust her, she has Bea ambushed and drugged by her henchman Jesper. Isolated and without Bea's support, Jodie crumbles during her hearing, while Bea wakes up strapped to a bed in the psych unit.
29	7	"The Long Game"	Kevin Carlin	Pete McTighe & Marcia Gardner	19 May 2015	104,000
Bea refuses to believe that she had a psychotic episode, despite it being filmed on CCTV. She maintains that she was attacked by a man and when her blood is found to have traces of LSD, she realises that she was deliberately drugged. She smuggles DNA evidence out of the psych unit. Meanwhile, Liz struggles to stay sober, despite the upset it is causing those around her. Bridget tries to help Franky accept that she has an emotional block, but when she challenges Franky to talk about her mother, Franky breaks down and confesses to accidentally killing Meg Jackson. Meanwhile, Ferguson has been secretly recording the session.
30	8	"Goldfish"	Kevin Carlin	John Ridley	26 May 2015	108,000
Ferguson worries that her lack of emotion over her goldfish's death may be a weakness and seeks to forge connections with others. She invites Vera to dinner, only for Vera to confront her over leaving her during the riot, and reveal that she has contracted Hepatitis C from being scratched with an infected syringe. Ferguson also tries reaching out to Doreen as her pregnancy reaches full term and unwittingly calls Doreen "Jianna", the name of her former inmate-lover. Bea believes there may be a way of getting to Ferguson and tells Doreen to find out more. Bea also enlists Kaz's help to track down Ferguson's henchman. Doreen goes into labour and she gives birth to a boy. In the aftermath, Ferguson is devastated when she overhears Doreen telling Bea about Jianna and calling Ferguson a freak.
31	9	"Freak Show" (Note: Season 3, episode 9 is alternatively titled "Night of the Long Pencils" in the UK.)	Catherine Millar	Adam Todd	2 June 2015	108,000
Jodie Spiteri has harmed herself whilst in the psych unit and Ferguson seeks to limit any damage from further allegations, plotting against Bridget. Bridget has a conflict of interest when she admits to Franky that she has developed feelings for her. Doreen finds motherhood to be a strain, while Bea is exhausted as the cold war against Ferguson takes its toll on her friends. Vera is suspicious about Jodie and Bea's claims about Ferguson and begins to turn against her.
32	10	"A Higher Court"	Catherine Millar	Stuart Page	9 June 2015	127,000
Vera reaches out to Bridget and tells her that she believes Ferguson manipulated Jodie to self-harm and that she arranged the attack on Bea. With her parole hearing approaching, Franky is in trouble when her former lover Kim gets revenge by planting balloons filled with heroin in her cell. Faced with a cell-toss, Franky has no option but to swallow the evidence, and faces the parole board with a gutful of heroin. Just when it seems she could be granted parole, Ferguson releases the taped confession, letting Will know who really killed his wife. Meanwhile, Bea and Fletch team up against Ferguson. Doreen considers whether to keep her son in Wentworth with her or give him to her sister, and Jess takes a special interest in Joshua.
33	11	"The Living and the Dead"	Steve Jodrell	John Ridley	16 June 2015	109,000
Bea and Fletch put their plan against Ferguson into action, using the memory of Jianna to unbalance her, but Fletch unwittingly sets Vera up to take the blame. Vera confronts Ferguson, and is also out for revenge against Lucy "Juice" Gambaro for infecting her with Hepatitis C. Jess schemes to discredit Liz and take her place as alternate carer for Doreen's baby, Joshua. Fletch finally regains his memory and alerts Will, who is on the verge of being arrested for Harry's murder. Ferguson realises that everyone at Wentworth is now coming for her and she begins to unravel.
34	12	"Blood and Fire"	Steve Jodrell	Pete McTighe	23 June 2015	113,000
Ferguson is losing control as both officers and prisoners alike conspire to overthrow her. Liz helps Sophie face up to the consequences of her actions. Bea discovers the final piece of the puzzle to help solve Harry's murder. Franky prepares for her release while Matt survives an attempt by Ferguson's henchman Nils Jasper to kill him. Back at Wentworth, Doreen is distraught when her son goes missing as Jess reveals her true agenda. Ferguson saves baby Joshua but murders Jess and sets the prison on fire in an attempt to hide her crime. Bea and Will rescue Joshua and Ferguson. Ferguson is arrested for her crimes in the presence of the prisoners.

== Production ==
On 29 January 2014, it was announced that FremantleMedia had renewed Wentworth for a third season, set to air in 2015.

Jo Porter, the Director of Drama at FremantleMedia stated, "Foxtel have been the perfect broadcast partner and have given Wentworth the ideal platform for it to achieve such success both domestically and then internationally. To have this unique Australian program now airing across the globe fills us with great pride. The commissioning of season three is such a compliment to the hard work and talent of the writers, directors, our outstanding cast and of course the crew, most of whom have been with us since season one. We look forward to continuing our success both here and overseas."

Brian Walsh, the Executive Director of Television at Foxtel stated, "Wentworth's first season was a triumph with its remarkable performance and production qualities which enthralled our Australian audience and achieved such great international recognition. Since October, the cast and the production team, led by producer Amanda Crittenden, have been back on-location delivering on the promise of season two's gripping scripts and the story lines for season three are sensational."

A third season was confirmed on 29 January 2014. A five-month production commenced in the purpose-built set in March 2014. The final table read for season three took place on 8 July 2014. Filming for the third season began in March 2014 and concluded in July 2014.

Former All Saints stars Pia Miranda, Libby Tanner and Tammy Macintosh joined the cast as inmate Jodie Spiteri, psychologist Bridget Westfall and vigilante Karen Proctor, respectively.

== Reception ==
=== Ratings ===
No.	Title	Air date	Overnight ratings		Ref(s)
No.	Title	Air date	Viewers	Rank	Ref(s)
1	"The Governor's Pleasure"	7 April 2015	100,000	1	
2	"Failing Upwards"	14 April 2015	94,000	1	
3	"Knives Out"	21 April 2015	98,000	1	
4	"Righteous Acts"	28 April 2015	102,000	1	
5	"Mercy"	5 May 2015	97,000	3	
6	"Evidence"	12 May 2015	118,000	1	
7	"The Long Game"	19 May 2015	104,000	1	
8	"Goldfish"	26 May 2015	108,000	2	
9	"Freak Show"	2 June 2015	108,000	1	
10	"A Higher Court"	9 June 2015	127,000	1	
11	"The Living and the Dead"	16 June 2015	109,000	1	
12	"Blood and Fire"	23 June 2015	113,000	1	

=== Accolades ===
AACTA Awards (2015)

- Won: Best Lead Actress in a Television Drama – Pamela Rabe
- Nominated: Best Television Drama Series – Wentworth – Jo Porter & Amanda Crittenden
- Nominated: Subscription Television 20th Anniversary Award for Best Drama – Wentworth

Australian Writers' Guild Awards (2015 & 2016)

- Won: Best Script for a Television Series – Stuart Page (Episode 1: "The Governor's Pleasure")
- Nominated: Best Script for a Television Series – Pete McTighe (Episode 12: "Blood and Fire")

Logie Awards (2016)

- Nominated: Most Outstanding Actress – Pamela Rabe
- Won: Most Outstanding Supporting Actress – Celia Ireland
- Nominated: Most Outstanding Drama Series – Wentworth

== Home media ==
Title	Release	Country	DVD	Blu-ray	Region	Ref(s)
Wentworth: The Complete Season 3	14 October 2015	Australia	Yes	Yes	4/B	
Wentworth Prison: Season Three	12 October 2015	UK	Yes	No	2	
Wentworth: Season 3	6 June 2017	U.S.	Yes	No	1	
Wentworth: Die Komplette Dritte Staffel	30 June 2017	Germany	Yes	Yes	2/B	
Additional
Distributor: Roadshow Entertainment (Australia); FremantleMedia (United Kingdom); Acorn DVD (United States); WVG Medien (Germany); Set details: 12 episodes; 555 minutes; 1.78:1 aspect ratio; DVD Audio: English: Dolby Digital 5.1 (regions 1, 2 & 4); English: Dolby Digital 2.0 (region 2 Germany); Deutsch: Dolby Digital 2.0 (region 2 Germany); Blu-ray Audio: English: DTS-HD 2.0 (region B Germany); Deutsch: DTS-HD 2.0 (region B Germany); English: DTS-Master Audio 5.1 (Region B Australia); Subtitles: Deutsch (DVD & Blu-ray Germany); English SDH (DVD & Blu-ray Australia); Discs: 4-DVD set (region 1); 4-DVD Deluxe Edition set (region 2 UK); 4-DVD set (region 2 Germany); 3-Blu-ray set (Region B Germany); 4-DVD set (Region 4); 3-Blu-ray set (Region B Australia); Rating: ACB: MA15+; BBFC: 18; FSK: 16
