= Hugo Weaving =

Actor (born 1960)

Hugo Weaving AO
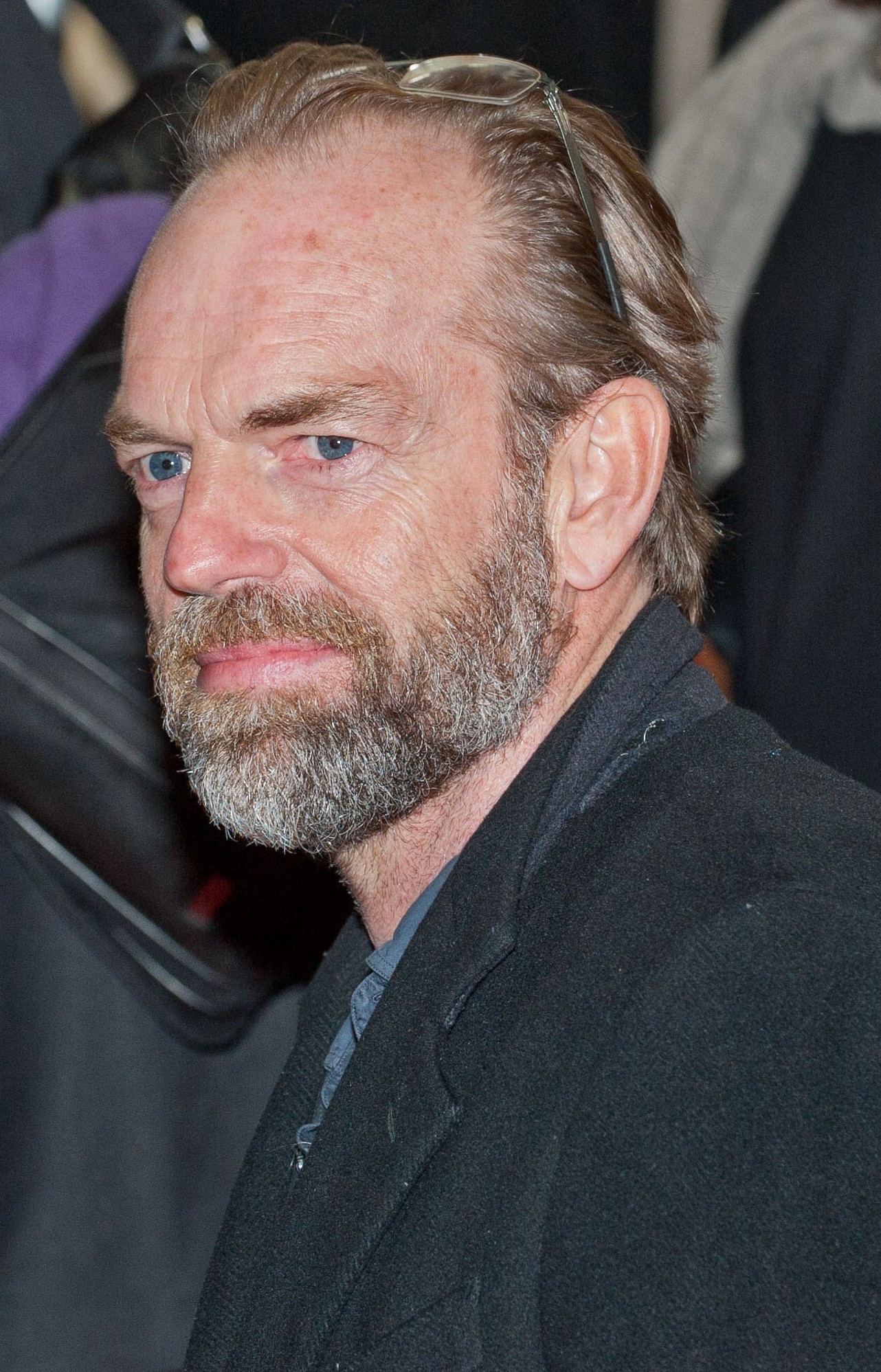
- Weaving in 2014
- Born: Hugo Wallace Weaving; 4 April 1960 (age 66); Ibadan, British Nigeria
- Citizenship: United Kingdom
- Education: National Institute of Dramatic Art
- Occupation: Actor
- Years active: 1983–present
- Partner: Katrina Greenwood (1984‍–‍present)
- Children: 2, including Harry Greenwood
- Relatives: Samara Weaving (niece)

Hugo Wallace Weaving (born 4 April 1960) is a stage, screen, and voice actor. Born in Colonial Nigeria to British parents, Weaving has lived in Australia since 1976, although he retains British citizenship. He undertook his acting training at NIDA in Sydney. He became known internationally for his appearances in the Australian films Proof (1991) and The Adventures of Priscilla, Queen of the Desert (1994), and more widely known as Agent Smith in the first three The Matrix films (1999–2003) and Elrond in The Lord of the Rings trilogy (2001–2003).

Weaving landed his first major role as English cricket captain Douglas Jardine on the Australian television series Bodyline (1984), and won his first AACTA Award for Priscilla. He is also known for his role as the title character in V for Vendetta (2005), The Wolfman (2010), Johann Schmidt / Red Skull in the Marvel Cinematic Universe film Captain America: The First Avenger (2011), and again as Elrond in The Hobbit trilogy (2012–2014). He has won many Australian Academy of Cinema and Television Arts (AACTA) Awards for his film and television performances, as well as other awards for stage performances.

He has also done several voice-over roles, including in the films Babe (1995), Happy Feet (2006), Happy Feet Two (2011), and as Megatron in the Transformers series (2007–2011). He reprised his roles of Agent Smith and Elrond in Matrix and Lord of the Rings video game adaptations.

== Early life and education ==
Hugo Wallace Weaving was born on 4 April 1960 in Ibadan, Nigeria (then a British colony). He was the second child of English parents: mother Anne Lennard, a tour guide and former teacher, and father Wallace Weaving, a seismologist, who met as students at the University of Bristol. His maternal grandmother was Belgian. A year after his birth, his family returned to the United Kingdom, living in Bedford and Brighton. They then moved first to Melbourne, then Sydney in Australia; back to England briefly; Johannesburg in South Africa before returning to the UK, where they lived first in Beaconsfield and then Bristol.

While in the UK, Weaving attended The Downs School, Wraxall, near Bristol, and Queen Elizabeth's Hospital. While at the Downs School, in 1973, Weaving played one of his first theatrical roles, taking the part of Captain Asquith in Robert Bolt's The Thwarting of Baron Bolligrew.

His family moved back to Sydney, Australia in 1976, to settle permanently. Hugo was 16, had just completed his O-levels, and was not keen to move. In Sydney, he attended Knox Grammar School, settled in quickly, and, according to his mother, was always able to make friends easily. His parents separated not long after they migrated.

Weaving went on to study at Sydney's National Institute of Dramatic Art, graduating with a Diploma of Dramatic Art (Acting) in 1981. Weaving has said that though his roots are in Australia, and he considers it his country, he feels neither wholly English nor wholly Australian.

== Career ==
=== 1982–1998 ===
Weaving first appeared in a production by the Sydney Theatre Company (STC) in 1982, and by 2021 had worked in more than 20 of their productions.

His first television role was in the 1984 Australian television series Bodyline, as the English cricket captain Douglas Jardine. Weaving appeared in the Australian miniseries The Dirtwater Dynasty in 1988 and as Geoffrey Chambers in the drama Barlow and Chambers: A Long Way From Home. He starred opposite Nicole Kidman in the 1989 TV mini-series Bangkok Hilton. He appeared as Sir John in Yahoo Serious's 1993 comedy Reckless Kelly, a lampoon of Australian outlaw Ned Kelly.

In the mid-1990s, Weaving portrayed the drag queen Anthony "Tick" Belrose/Mitzi Del Bra in the 1994 film The Adventures of Priscilla, Queen of the Desert, and provided the voice of Rex the sheepdog in the 1995 family film Babe and its 1998 sequel Babe: Pig in the City. In 1998, he played a suspected serial killer in The Interview.

=== 1999–2010: The Matrix and Lord of the Rings ===
Weaving played the enigmatic and evil-minded Agent Smith in the 1999 film The Matrix. He later reprised that role in the film's 2003 sequels, The Matrix Reloaded and The Matrix Revolutions. He was a voice actor in the cartoon film The Magic Pudding.

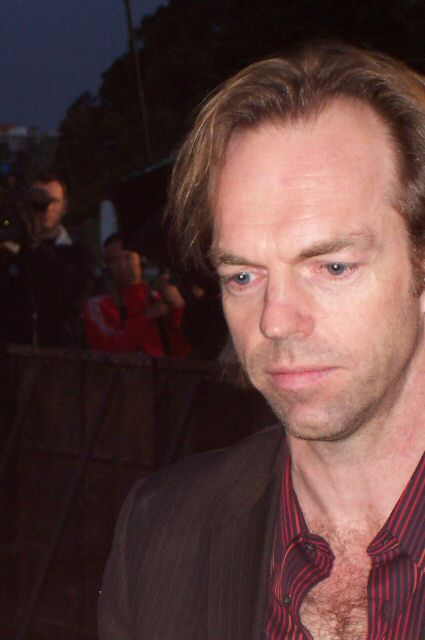
Weaving at The Matrix Revolutions premiere in 2003

He received additional acclaim in the role of the half-elven lord Elrond in Peter Jackson's three-film adaptation of The Lord of the Rings, released between 2001 and 2003. Weaving was the main actor in Andrew Kotatko's award-winning film Everything Goes (2004). He starred as a heroin-addicted ex-rugby league player in the 2005 Australian indie film Little Fish, opposite Cate Blanchett.

Weaving played the title role as V in the 2005 film V for Vendetta, in which he was reunited with the Wachowskis, creators of The Matrix trilogy, who wrote the adapted screenplay. Actor James Purefoy was originally signed to play the role, but was fired six weeks into filming over creative differences.

Weaving reprised his role as Elrond for the video game The Lord of the Rings: The Battle for Middle-Earth II. In 2006, he worked with Cate Blanchett on a reprise of the STC production of Hedda Gabler in New York City.

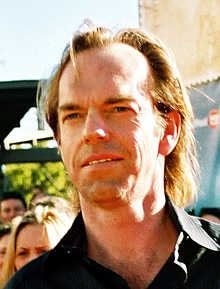
Weaving at The Lord of the Rings: The Return of the King premiere in 2003

In a controversial move by director Michael Bay, Weaving was chosen as the Decepticon leader Megatron vocally in the 2007 live-action film Transformers, rather than using the original version of the character's voice created by the voice actor Frank Welker. Weaving himself was unaware of the controversy, having accepted the role based on Michael Bay's personal request; in a November 2008 Sun Herald interview, he said he had never seen Transformers. Though Weaving reprised his role in two sequels, he does not have much personal investment in the Transformers films. In February 2010, Weaving revealed to The Age: "Director Michael Bay talks to me on the phone. I've never met him. We were doing the voice for the second one and I still hadn't seen the first one. I still didn't really know who the characters were and I didn't know what anything was. It's a voice job, for sure, and people assume I've spent my life working on it, but I really know so little about it."

Weaving played a supporting role in Joe Johnston's 2010 remake of the 1941 film The Wolfman, starring Benicio del Toro. Immediately after Wolfman wrapped in spring 2008, he returned home to Australia to film a lead role in the film Last Ride, directed by Glendyn Ivin. In early 2009, Guillermo del Toro, then director of The Hobbit films, prequels to The Lord of the Rings, confirmed his intent to again cast Weaving as Elrond of Rivendell in a BBC interview. When asked about reprising the role, Weaving replied that he was game, but had not officially been approached. Del Toro eventually left the project; Peter Jackson decided to direct the films himself but Weaving was not officially confirmed in the cast until May 2011.

Weaving spent the summer of 2009 starring in the Melbourne Theatre Company's production of God of Carnage, portraying the caustic lawyer Alain Reille. He returned to the stage in November 2010 in Sydney Theatre Company's Uncle Vanya, co-starring Cate Blanchett and Richard Roxburgh. Weaving filmed a guest role on Roxburgh's Australian TV series Rake in May 2010.

In May 2009, Weaving accepted a co-starring role in the docudrama Oranges and Sunshine, about the forced migration of thousands of British children to Australia in the 1950s. Filming began in autumn 2009 in Nottingham, England, and Adelaide, South Australia, and continued through January 2010. The film premiered at the Rome International Film Festival on 28 October 2010 and garnered positive reviews. 2010 saw the release of Legend of the Guardians (formerly The Guardians of Ga'Hoole), in which Weaving has another high-profile voice role, portraying two different owls named Noctus and Grimble in Zack Snyder's film adaptation of Kathryn Lasky's popular series of children's books.

On 4 May 2010, it was officially confirmed by Marvel Studios that Weaving would play the Nazi supervillain Johann Schmidt / Red Skull in the superhero film Captain America: The First Avenger. Weaving completed filming his role on the project in September 2010 and returned to Sydney to prepare for Uncle Vanya. It is unlikely he will sign on for any further installments in the Marvel Cinematic Universe (MCU); in an August 2011 Baltimore Sun interview, the actor confided he is weary of typecasting and of "blockbuster" films in general: "I think I've about had enough... I'm not sure how many more of them I'll make. It doesn't feel to me as though they've been the majority of my work, though that's probably the way it seems to most other people." Red Skull returned in the MCU films Avengers: Infinity War (2018) and Avengers: Endgame (2019), with Ross Marquand replacing Weaving in the role.

=== 2011–2019 ===
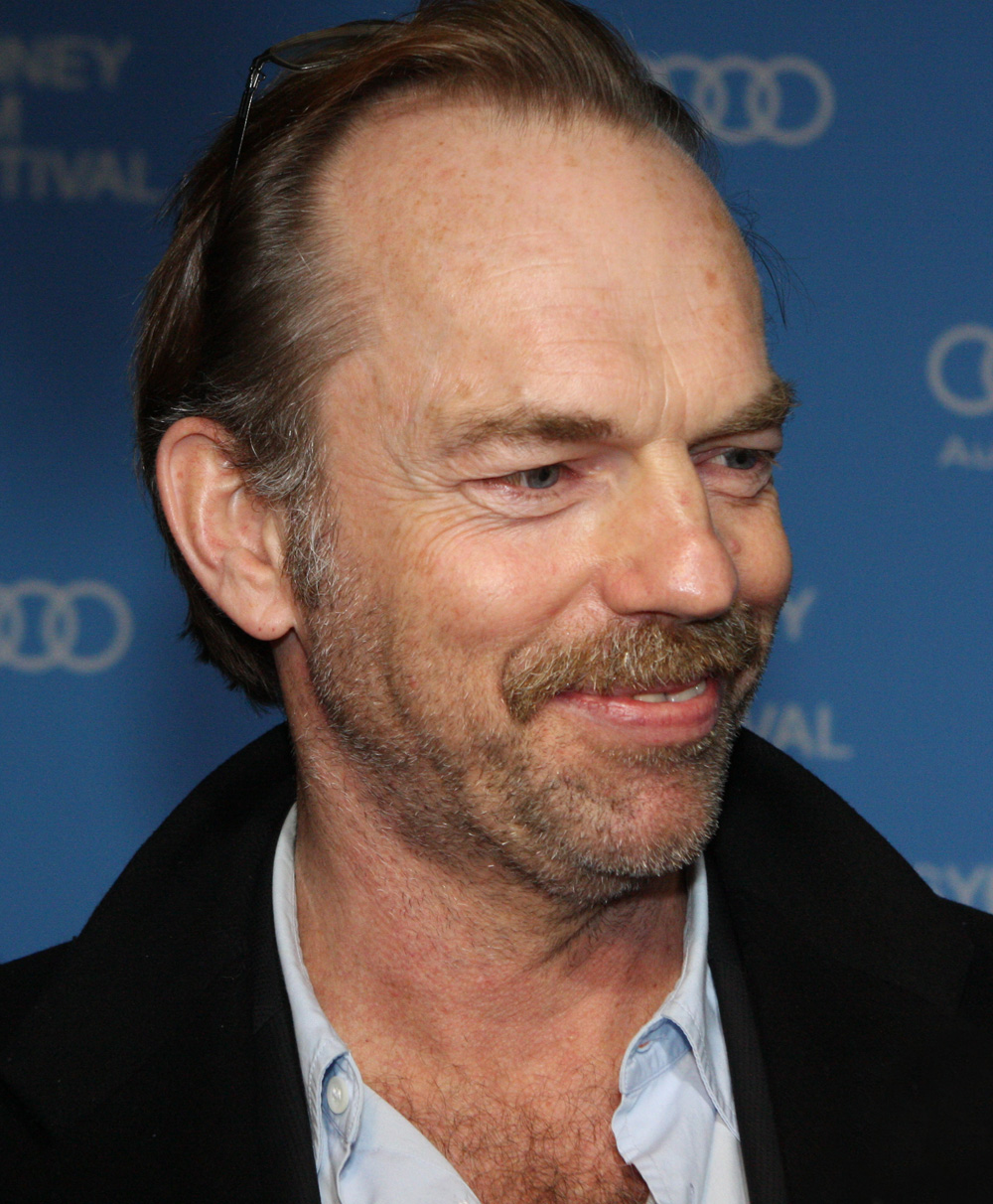
Weaving at Sydney Film Festival in 2013

On 13 March 2011, The Key Man, which Weaving filmed in 2006, finally debuted at the South By Southwest Festival in Austin, Texas. The child migrant saga Oranges and Sunshine opened in the UK on 1 April, the culmination of months of success on the festival circuit in late 2010-early 2011. In March, the Sydney Theatre Company and John F. Kennedy Center for the Performing Arts announced that STC's 2010 production of Chekhov's Uncle Vanya would be reprised in Washington, D.C., during the month of August. In April, months of speculation finally ended when Weaving appeared on The Hobbit's New Zealand set, shortly before a production spokesman officially confirmed the actor's return as Elrond in Peter Jackson's prequel trilogy to The Lord of the Rings. He was part of the cast of the Wachowskis' adaptation of David Mitchell's novel Cloud Atlas. The project, co-starring Tom Hanks, Ben Whishaw, Halle Berry, Jim Broadbent, and Susan Sarandon, began filming in September 2011 and was released in October 2012.

Weaving returned to the stage in a Sydney Theatre Company adaptation of Christopher Hampton's play Les Liaisons Dangereuses in March 2012. He portrayed the notorious Vicomte de Valmont, a character he first played onstage in 1987. His frequent stage foil Pamela Rabe costarred. Weaving and Cate Blanchett reprised their roles in STC's internationally lauded production of Uncle Vanya for a ten-day run at New York's Lincoln Center in July.

He joined the cast of three forthcoming Australian films in summer 2012. The Western-tinged police thriller Mystery Road, written and directed by Ivan Sen, began filming in June 2012. Weaving appeared in the prison drama Healing for director Craig Monahan, with whom he previously made The Interview (1998) and Peaches (2005). He appeared in a segment of the Australian anthology film The Turning, based on Tim Winton's collection of linked stories, entitled "The Commission", directed by David Wenham. He ended 2013 co-starring with Richard Roxburgh and Philip Quast in Samuel Beckett's Waiting For Godot, for the Sydney Theatre Company.

In the spring of 2013, Weaving reprised the Agent Smith role for a General Electric television commercial for their "Brilliant Machines" innovations in healthcare management technology, which was slated to air during a break from 13 April's edition of Saturday Night Live, and subsequently continued to receive multiple airings on major cable networks.

From 26 July to 27 September 2014, Weaving played the titular role of Sydney Theatre Company's production of Macbeth. In an unusual treatment of the Shakespearian tragedy by young Sydney director Kip Williams, Weaving's performance was described by Peter Gotting of The Guardian as "the role of his career".

In October 2015, Weaving joined the cast of the film adaption of Craig Silvey's novel Jasper Jones. In 2018, Weaving starred as Thaddeus Valentine in Mortal Engines. In the same year, he appeared alongside Benedict Cumberbatch in the miniseries Patrick Melrose. In 2020, Weaving starred as Alfred in Tony Kushner's adaptation of The Visit.

=== 2020s ===
Since 2021, Weaving has starred as Glen Mathieson in the Australian intergenerational drama series Love Me.

In 2024, Weaving played character Frank Harkness in season 4 of Slow Horses. At the time, he was also in talks regarding a sequel to The Adventures of Priscilla, Queen of the Desert.

In August 2026, Weaving played the lead in the SBS drama series The Airport Chaplain, which earned good reviews.

In April 2026, Weaving was announced as part of the cast for Paramount+ series Dalliance. In June 2026, it was announced that Weaving had joined the production of The Great White a television production for ABC Television set to air in 2027.

== Other ventures ==
In 2004, Weaving became an ambassador for Australian animal rights organisation Voiceless, the animal protection institute. He attends events, promotes Voiceless in interviews, and assists in their judging of annual grants recipients.

Since 2020 and as of 2026, Weaving is on the board of the Adelaide Film Festival.

== Personal life ==
When he was 13 years old, Weaving was diagnosed with epilepsy. Although the condition rarely affected him and stopped in his early 30s, he still chooses not to drive, given the risk of a seizure.

He said in a 2014 interview that he "hate[s] flag-waving", and that although he holds a British passport, he does not feel English when he's in England.

Weaving has been in a relationship with Katrina Greenwood since 1984; they live in Sydney and have two children together: Harry Greenwood, an actor, and Holly Greenwood, an artist. The children were given their mother's surname, which Weaving's son described as the family's "stand against the patriarchy."

Weaving has a brother and a sister. He is the uncle of actress Samara Weaving, who began her career in Australia before transitioning to American roles. Both appeared in the 2013 Australian film Mystery Road. His younger niece Morgan Weaving appeared on the Australian soap opera Home and Away alongside her sister.

== Recognition and awards ==
A portrait of Weaving painted by Nicholas Harding in 2011, titled "Weaving at Home", is held by the National Gallery of Australia in Canberra.

In 2020 Weaving was made Officer of the Order of Australia (AO) in the Australia Day Honours List, "for distinguished service to the performing arts as an actor, and as a mentor of young writers, directors and film makers".

He has been nominated for or won many awards for his performances on stage and screen. His wins include:

- 1991 – Australian Film Institute Awards (AFI Awards), Best Actor in a Lead Role: Proof
- 1998 – AFI Award, Best Actor in a Lead Role: The Interview
- 2005 – Australian Film Institute Awards, Best Actor in a Lead Role: Little Fish
- 2005 – IF Award: Little Fish
- 2007 – The Constellation Awards, Best Male Performance in a 2006 Science Fiction Film, TV Movie, or Miniseries: V for Vendetta
- 2008 – V Australia IF Living Legend award, a lifetime achievement award
- 2010 – AFI Award for Best Actor in a Supporting Role, for Oranges and Sunshine
- 2011 – Sydney Theatre Award, Best Supporting Actor, for Uncle Vanya
- 2012 – Helen Hayes Award, Best Supporting Performer, Non-Resident Production: Uncle Vanya
- 2015 – AACTA Award for Best Actor in a Supporting Role, for The Dressmaker
- 2016 – AACTA Award for Best Actor in a Supporting Role, for Hacksaw Ridge
- 2018 – Helpmann Award for Best Male Actor in a Play, for Arturo Ui in the Sydney Theatre Company's The Resistible Rise of Arturo Ui
- 2018 – Satellite Award for Best Supporting Actor – Series, Miniseries or Television Film: Patrick Melrose
- 2020 – Fargo Film Festival, Best Actor: Hearts and Bones
- 2024 – AACTA Award for Best Lead Actor in a Television Drama: Love Me
- 2024 – AACTA Award for Best Actor in a Supporting Role: The Rooster

== Filmography ==
=== Film ===
Year	Title	Role	Notes	Refs.
1980	...Maybe This Time	Student 2		
1983	The City's Edge	Andy White		
1986	For Love Alone	Jonathan Crow		
1987	The Right Hand Man	Ned Devine		
1990	...Almost	Jake		
1991	Proof	Martin	AACTA Award for Best Actor in a Leading Role	
1992	Road to Alice	Louis		
1993	Frauds	Jonathan Wheats		
1993	Reckless Kelly	Sir John		
1993	The Custodian	Det. Church		
1994	Exile	Innes		
1994	The Adventures of Priscilla, Queen of the Desert	Anthony "Tick" Belrose / Mitzi Del Bra	Nominated — AACTA Award for Best Actor in a Leading Role	
1994	What's Going On, Frank?	Strange Packer in Supermarket		
1995	Babe	Rex (voice)		
1997	True Love and Chaos	Morris		
1998	Babe: Pig in the City	Rex (voice)	Cameo	
1998	Bedrooms and Hallways	Jeremy		
1998	The Interview	Eddie Rodney Fleming	AACTA Award for Best Actor in a Leading Role; Montreal World Film Festival Award for Best Actor; Nominated — FCCA Award for Best Supporting Actor	
1998	The Kiss	Barry		
1999	Strange Planet	Steven		
1999	Little Echo Lost	Echo Man		
1999	The Matrix	Agent Smith	Nominated — Blockbuster Entertainment Award for Favorite Villain	
2000	The Magic Pudding	Bill Barnacle (voice)		
2001	Russian Doll	Harvey		
2001	The Old Man Who Read Love Stories	Rubicondo (Dentist)	Nominated — AACTA Award for Best Actor in a Supporting Role; Nominated — FCCA Award for Best Supporting Actor	
2001	The Lord of the Rings: The Fellowship of the Ring	Elrond	Nominated — Screen Actors Guild Award for Outstanding Performance by a Cast in a Motion Picture	
2002	The Lord of the Rings: The Two Towers	Elrond	Nominated — Screen Actors Guild Award for Outstanding Performance by a Cast in a Motion Picture	
2003	The Matrix Reloaded	Agent Smith	Nominated — MTV Movie Award for Best Fight (shared with Keanu Reeves)	
2003	The Matrix Revolutions	Agent Smith		
2003	The Lord of the Rings: The Return of the King	Elrond	Broadcast Film Critics Association Award for Best Cast; National Board of Review Award for Best Cast; Screen Actors Guild Award for Outstanding Performance by a Cast in a Motion Picture	
2004	Everything Goes	Ray	Inside Film Awards: Best Short Film	
2004	Peaches	Alan		
2005	Little Fish	Lionel Dawson	AACTA Award for Best Actor in a Leading Role; FCCA Award for Best Actor in a Supporting Role; Inside Film Award for Best Actor	
2006	V for Vendetta	V	Nominated — International Award for Best Actor	
2006	Happy Feet	Noah (voice)		
2007	Transformers	Megatron (voice)	Nominated — Teen Choice Award for Choice Movie Villain	
2007	In the Company of Actors	Himself / Judge Brack		
2008	The Tender Hook	McHeath		
2009	Transformers: Revenge of the Fallen	Megatron (voice)		
2009	Last Ride	Kev	Nominated — AACTA Award for Best Actor in a Leading Role	
2010	The Wolfman	Detective Francis Abberline		
2010	Oranges and Sunshine	Jack	AACTA Award for Best Actor in a Supporting Role; Nominated — Satellite Award for Best Supporting Actor in a Motion Picture	
2010	Legend of the Guardians: The Owls of Ga'Hoole	Noctus and Grimble (voice)		
2011	Transformers: Dark of the Moon	Megatron (voice)		
2011	The Key Man	Vincent		
2011	Captain America: The First Avenger	Johann Schmidt / Red Skull	Nominated — Teen Choice Award for Choice Movie Fight (with Chris Evans); Nominated — Scream Award for Best Villain	
2011	Happy Feet Two	Noah (voice)		
2012	Cloud Atlas	Various roles		
2012	The Hobbit: An Unexpected Journey	Elrond		
2013	Mystery Road	Johnno		
2013	The Turning	Bob Lang	Nominated — AACTA Award for Best Actor in a Leading Role	
2014	Healing	Matt Perry		
2014	The Mule	Croft	Nominated — AFCA Award for Best Supporting Actor	
2014	The Hobbit: The Battle of the Five Armies	Elrond		
2015	Strangerland	David Rae		
2015	The Dressmaker	Sergeant Farrat	AACTA Award for Best Actor in a Supporting Role; AFCA Award for Best Supporting Actor; Nominated — Film Critics Circle of Australia for Best Supporting Actor	
2016	Hacksaw Ridge	Tom Doss	AACTA Award for Best Actor in a Supporting Role	
2017	Jasper Jones	Mad Jack Lionel	Nominated — AACTA Award for Best Actor in a Supporting Role	
2018	Black '47	Hannah		
2018	Mortal Engines	Thaddeus Valentine		
2019	Hearts and Bones	Daniel Fisher	Nominated — AACTA Award for Best Actor in a Leading Role; Winner — Fargo Film Festival for Best Actor	
2019	Measure for Measure	Duke		
2021	Lone Wolf	Police Minister		
2022	Expired	Dr. Michael Bergman		
2023	The Royal Hotel	Billy		
2023	The Rooster	The Hermit	Directed by Mark Leonard Winter; AACTA Award for Best Actor in a Supporting Role	
2024	How to Make Gravy	Noel		
TBA	Priscilla Queen of the Desert 2	Anthony "Tick" Belrose / Mitzi Del Bra	Filming	

=== Television ===
Year	Title	Role	Notes	Refs.
1984	Bodyline	Douglas Jardine	7 episodes	
1987	Frontier	Governor Arthur	3 episodes	
1988	Melba	Charles Armstrong	6 episodes	
1988	The Dirtwater Dynasty	Richard Eastwick	5 episodes	
1988	Dadah Is Death	Geoffrey Chambers	Television film	
1989	Bangkok Hilton	Richard Carlisle	3 episodes	
1993	Seven Deadly Sins	Lust	Episode: "Lust"	
1995	Bordertown	Kenneth Pearson	10 episodes	
1996	The Bite	Jack Shannon	2 episodes	
1996	Naked: Stories of Men	Martin Furlong	Episode: "Coral Island"	
1997	Halifax f.p.	Det. Sgt. Tom Hurkos	Episode: "Isn't It Romantic"	
2003	After the Deluge	Martin Kirby	Television film	
2010	Rake	Prof Graham Murray	Episode: "R vs Murray"	
2010	Inside the Firestorm	Narrator	Documentary	
2010	I, Spry	Narrator	Documentary	
2017	Seven Types of Ambiguity	Dr Alex Klima	5 episodes	
2018	Patrick Melrose	David Melrose	5 episodes	
2021	Mr. Corman	Artie Corman	Episode: "Mr. Corman"	
2021–‍23	Love Me	Glen	12 episodes	
2023	Koala Man	King Emudeus	Episode: "Emu War II"	
2024, 2026–present	Slow Horses	Frank Harkness	Seasons 4, 6	
2026	Dalliance	Billy	TV series	
2026	The Airport Chaplain	Tobias Wallace	TV series	
2027	The Great White	Alan Armstrong	TV Series	

=== Video games ===
Year	Title	Voice role	Refs.
2003	Enter the Matrix	Agent Smith	
2006	The Lord of the Rings: The Battle for Middle-earth II	Elrond	
2009	The Lord of the Rings: Conquest	Elrond	

=== Music video ===
Year	Title	Artist	Role
2021	Heavy	song by Flight Facilities	George

== Theatre ==
Year	Title	Role	Notes	Refs.
1973	Robert Bolt's The Thwarting of Baron Bolligrew	Captain Asquith	The Downs School, Wraxall	
1982	You Can't Take It with You	First Man	Sydney Theatre Company with Geoffrey Rush & Heather Mitchell	
1982	A Map of the World	Paul	Sydney Theatre Company. Diir. David Hare	
1982	The Perfectionist	Erik	Sydney Theatre Company with John Bell, Robyn Nevin, Colin Friels & Heather Mitchell. Dir. Richard Wherrett (later toured USA)	
1982	Pirandello's As You Desire Me	One of the Three Young Men	Sydney Theatre Company	
1983	The Way of the World	Petulant	Sydney Theatre Company with Ruth Cracknell & Drew Forsythe	
1983	Gossip from the Forest		Sydney Theatre Company	
1986	The Madras House	Philip	Sydney Theatre Company with Geoff Morrell	
1987	Les Liaisons Dangereuses	Vicomte de Valmont	Nimrod Theatre Company	
1989	The Secret Rapture	Irwin	Sydney Theatre Company with Pamela Rabe & Heather Mitchell	
1993	The Cherry Orchard	Trofimov	Sydney Theatre Company	
1994	That Eye, The Sky	Henry	Sydney Arts Festival & Playhouse, Melbourne for Burning House Theatre Company	
1994	Arcadia	Bernard Nightingale	Sydney Theatre Company with Helen Thomson	
2000	The White Devil	Duke of Brachiano	Theatre Royal, Sydney for Sydney Theatre Company with Angie Milliken, Paula Arundell, Bruce Spence & Heather Mitchell	
2003	The Real Thing	Henry	Sydney Theatre Company with Angie Milliken	
2006	Hedda Gabler	Judge Brack	Brooklyn Academy of Music for Sydney Theatre Company with Cate Blanchett, Justine Clarke & Aden Young. Dir. Robyn Nevin. Production was the subject of the 2007 feature film In the Company of Actors	
2007	Riflemind	John	Sydney Theatre Company. Dir. Philip Seymour Hoffman. Artistic Dir. Andrew Upton	
2009	God of Carnage	Alain Reille	Melbourne Theatre Company	
2010	Uncle Vanya	Astrov	Sydney Theatre Company with Cate Blanchett & Richard Roxburgh	
2011	Uncle Vanya	Astrov	Washington D.C. for Sydney Theatre Company & John F. Kennedy Center for the Performing Arts with Cate Blanchett & Richard Roxburgh	
2012	Les Liaisons Dangereuses	Vicomte de Valmont	Sydney Theatre Company with Pamela Rabe & Justine Clarke	
2012	Uncle Vanya	Astrov	New York's Lincoln Center for Sydney Theatre Company with Cate Blanchett & Richard Roxburgh	
2013	Waiting For Godot	Vladimir	Sydney Theatre Company with Richard Roxburgh and Philip Quast. Dir. Andrew Upton	
2014	Macbeth	Macbeth	Sydney Theatre Company	
2015	Waiting For Godot	Vladimir	Barbican Centre, London for Sydney Theatre Company with Richard Roxburgh and Philip Quast. Dir. Andrew Upton	
2015	Endgame	Hamm	Sydney Theatre Company. Dir. Andrew Upton	
2018	The Resistible Rise of Arturo Ui	Arturo Ui	Sydney Theatre Company Won a Helpmann award	
2019	Cat on a Hot Tin Roof	Big Daddy	Sydney Theatre Company	
2020	The Visit	Alfred	Tony Kushner's adaptation at National Theatre, London	
2020	Wonnangatta	Harry	Sydney Theatre Company	
2024	The President	The President	Gate Theatre, Dublin and Sydney Theatre Company	

== See also ==
- List of Australian film actors
