= The Great White (TV series) =

- Directed by: Alyssa McClelland; Samantha Lang; Mia Wasikowska
- Starring: Hugo Weaving; Miranda Otto; Eamon Farren; Arlo Green; Sacha Horler; Brigid Zengeni
- Country of origin: Australia
- Original language: English

Production
- Production company: See-Saw Films

Original release
- Network: ABC

The Great White is an upcoming Australian television legal drama for the Australian Broadcasting Corporation (ABC) releasing in 2027. Produced by See-Saw Films, the series follows Alan Armstrong, a barrister serving a 12 month supervision order for professional misconduct. Alan finds himself crushed by debt and desperate to restore his reputation, he takes on a case he considers beneath him.

== Plot ==
Alan Armstrong is a disgraced barrister serving a 12-month supervision order. Working above a panel beaters, crushed with debt and with his reputation in tatters, he takes on a case he would normally consider beneath him, but it draws him into the world of animal law.

== Cast ==
On 22 June 2026, the cast for the series was announced.

- Hugo Weaving as Alan Armstrong
- Eamon Farren
- Arlo Green
- Sacha Horler
- Brigid Zengeni
- Miranda Otto
- James Majoos
- Emily Barclay
- Dinasha Perera
- Scott McCormack

== Production ==
On 13 October 2025, it was announced that Mia Wasikowska had joined production for the series in her first production as a director.

On 15 November 2025, ABC announced it had green lit the series with Hugo Weaving in the role of Alan Armstrong.

On 23 June 2026, production on the six-episode series had officially commenced on location in Sydney, taking place in the suburbs of Maroubra, Malabar and Little Bay. The production secured funding from Screen Australia and Screen NSW. The series' producers were announced as See-Saw Films, and episodes would be directed by Alyssa McClelland, Samantha Lang and, in her directorial debut, Mia Wasikowska.
