= Darwin's Brave New World =

Television series

Darwin's Brave New World is a three-part (one hour each) drama-documentary TV series about Charles Darwin's evolution by means of natural selection. It uses reconstruction with present-day documentary between the 19th century and present day. The series was developed to coincide with the 150th anniversary of the publication of Darwin's On the Origin of Species.

It was produced with the assistance of the Canadian Television Fund in association with the Canadian Broadcasting Corporation and the Australian Broadcasting Corporation. Produced in association with the New South Wales Film and Television Office. It screened on ABC Australia in November 2009, and on CBC as part of the show The Nature of Things in November 2009.

== Cast ==
- Wendy Hughes as Narrator
- Socratis Otto as Charles Darwin
- Rick Jon Egan as Thomas Huxley
- Katie Fitchett as Emma Darwin
- Joe Manning as Sir Joseph Hooker
- Dan Spielman as Alfred Wallace
