= Eamon Farren =

Australian actor (born 1985)

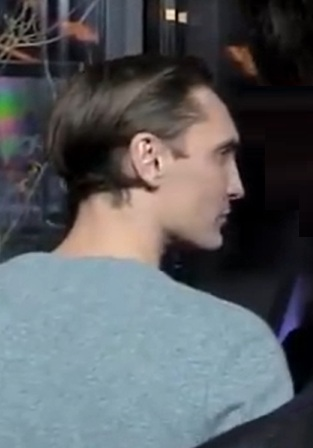
- Farren in 2019
- Born: Ingham, Queensland, Australia
- Education: Benowa State High School; National Institute of Dramatic Art (BFA) (2007)
- Occupation: Actor
- Years active: 2001–present

Eamon Farren is an Australian actor. Following starring roles in the films X: Night of Vengeance (2011) and Chained (2012) and an AACTA Award-winning turn in television film Carlotta (2014), he came to prominence portraying Richard Horne in the 2017 revival of Twin Peaks. Farren had a film role in Winchester (2018) and appeared in the series The ABC Murders (2018), The Witcher (2019–present) and Treasure & Dirt (2026).

== Early life and education ==
Eamon Farren was born in Ingham (North Queensland) and raised on the Gold Coast from the age of six. He said that he always knew he wanted to be an actor.

Farren attended Benowa State High School, studying in its French Immersion Program in which students study typical subjects but receive at least half of their schooling in French. He became school captain. Farren graduated from the National Institute of Dramatic Art (NIDA) in 2007. He credits his brother and also actors Daniel Day-Lewis and Gary Oldman as his primary influences and inspiration.

== Career ==
Farren began his career in the Showtime 2001 television film The Outsider, starring Naomi Watts and Tim Daly, followed by a guest role in Australian live action series The Sleepover Club in 2002.

In 2007, Farren was cast as Cpl. John Powell in the HBO miniseries The Pacific. He worked his way through all the visual arts in 2008, starring in The Man in the Attic with Sydney Theatre Company, the film Lucky Country (aka Dark Frontier), and Seven Network medical drama series All Saints. The following year he appeared in drama film Blessed, opposite Frances O’Connor and Miranda Otto.

In 2011, Farren appeared in Australian comedy-drama film Red Dog, with Josh Lucas and Rachael Taylor, and had a lead role in thriller X: Night of Vengeance. The following year, he landed a starring role in Jennifer Lynch's film Chained, playing 'Rabbit', a boy enslaved and raised by a serial killer played by Vincent D'Onofrio. Farren said, "...Shooting the film felt like second nature, the scenes would be focused but loose, incredibly tense but hilarious. I never had to say too much to her [Lynch], she would give me a look or whisper one word and I'd get it." That same year, he appeared in John Duigan drama film Careless Love, with a Peter O’Brien.

Farren's next major role was in the 2014 ABC TV telemovie, Carlotta, playing Danny/Ava, a transgender friend of the titular character (played by Jessica Marais), which earned him the 2015 AACTA Award for Best Guest or Supporting Actor in a Television Drama. Farren said of filming, "The whole thing was a highlight, but one of my favourite scenes to shoot was when Carol and Ava are on the way to buy hormones for the first time – corpsing never felt so right." During this time he also appeared in the crime thriller TV film The Killing Field, with Rebecca Gibney and Peter O’Brien. and had a lead role opposite Claire van der Boom in romantic drama film Love Is Now.

Farren's theatre career continued in 2014 with critically acclaimed roles as Edward Ridgeway in Switzerland and Elliott in Girl Asleep, which would be adapted to film and star Farren as a different character, Adam/Benoit Tremet, a year later. He also starred as Kirill in Sydney Theatre Company's The Present in 2015, reprising the role in 2017 for its Broadway production, which also starred Cate Blanchett in her Broadway debut.

Farren was cast as the character Richard Horne in the revival of the U.S. 1990s cult classic TV series Twin Peaks, which aired in 2017. That same year, he took on the role of Joshua in American film Mohawk. In 2018, he then appeared opposite John Malkovich in BBC mystery thriller miniseries The ABC Murders, played Jimmy in Australian sci-fi film Harmony and had the role of Ben Block, a Southern butler in The Spierig Brothers' supernatural horror film Winchester, opposite Helen Mirren, Sarah Snook and Jason Clarke.

The following year, Farren had a lead role in drama film Lingua Franca as Alex, who becomes romantically involved with an undocumented Filipino trans woman, who is in pursuit of a green card. He also joined the cast of Netflix fantasy drama series The Witcher, in an ongoing role as Cahir, alongside Henry Cavill. In 2021, he played archaeologist John Brailsford in British drama film The Dig, with Carey Mulligan and Ralph Fiennes, about an excavation of the Sutton Hoo ancient burial mounds in the UK.

More recently, Farren had a lead role in 2023 British sci-fi horror film T.I.M., playing the titular A.I. humanoid character. The following year, he appeared in 2024 American feature My First Film in the role of Joe, and portrayed Lucifer in coming-of-age biblical film Mary, opposite Anthony Hopkins as Herod. He then played the role of John in 2025 LGBTQI+ drama film Jimpa, opposite John Lithgow and Olivia Colman. He has also appeared in British comedy-drama series Big Mood, with Nicola Coughlan.

== Acting credits ==
=== Film ===
Year	Title	Role	Notes	Ref.
2009	Lucky Country (aka Dark Frontier)	Jimmy		
2009	360	Roc	Short	
2009	Blessed	Roo		
2010	Wanderlust	George	Short	
2010	A Parachute Falling in Siberia	Sales Assistant	Short	
2010	Crystal Jam	James	Short	
2011	Jailbirds	Dane	Short	
2011	X: Night of Vengeance	Harry		
2011	Red Dog	Dave		
2012	Three Sixty	Roc / Albert	Short	
2012	Chained	Rabbit / Tim		
2012	Careless Love	Patrick		
2013	The Fragments	Michael	Short	
2013	Test Drive	Cal	Short	
2014	Love Is Now	Dean		
2014	Marcia & the Shark	Frank	Short	
2015	Girl Asleep	Adam / Benoit Tremet		
2016	Measuring the Jump	Adam	Short	
2017	The Suitor	Mr Nuttell	Short	
2017	Mohawk	Joshua Pinsmail		
2018	Winchester	Ben Block		
2018	Harmony	Jimmy		
2019	Lingua Franca	Alex		
2021	The Dig	John Brailsford		
2021	On Our Watch	John Fuuber		
2023	T.I.M.	T.I.M.		
2024	My First Film	Joe		
2024	Mary	Lucifer		
2024	Addition	Nikola Tesla		
2025	Jimpa	Richard		

=== Television ===
Year	Title	Role	Notes	Ref.
2002	The Outsider	Levi Miller	Television film	
2003	The Sleepover Club	Dim / Video Shop Guy	2 episodes	
2008; 2009	All Saints	Caleb / Cody Frost	2 episodes	
2010	The Pacific	Cpl. John Powell	Miniseries, episode: "Basilone"	
2010	Rescue Special Ops	Arrow	Episode: "Off the Rails"	
2014	The Killing Field	Damian Jeffries	Television film	
2014	Carlotta	Danny / Ava	Television film	
2017	Twin Peaks: The Return	Richard Horne	6 episodes	
2018	The ABC Murders	Alexander Bonaparte Cust	3 episodes	
2019–present	The Witcher	Cahir Mawr Dyffryn aep Ceallach	Main role; 25 episodes	
2024–present	Big Mood	Klent	Comedy series	
2027	The Great White	TBA	TV series	

=== Theatre ===
Year	Title	Role	Theater	Ref.
2006	The Cherry Orchard	Trofimov	NIDA, Sydney	
2006	Hamlet	Hamlet	NIDA, Sydney	
2006	The Lost Echo	The Company	Sydney Theatre Company	
2007	The Rivals	Faukland	NIDA, Sydney	
2007	Sweet Charity	The Company	NIDA, Sydney	
2008	The Kid	Donald	Griffin Theatre Company	
2009	Ladybird	Slavik	Belvoir St Theatre, Sydney	
2010	The Beauty Queen of Leenane	Ray Dooley	Royal Lyceum Theatre with STC	
2010; 2014	Fugitive	Robin	Windmill Theatre Company	
2012	Babyteeth	Moses	Belvoir St Theatre, Sydney	
2013	Mrs Warren's Profession	Frank Gardner	Sydney Theatre Company	
2013	Romeo and Juliet	Mercutio	Sydney Theatre Company	
2014	Mojo	Skinny	Sydney Theatre Company	
2014	Switzerland	Edward Ridgeway	Sydney Theatre Company	
2014	Girl Asleep	Elliott	Windmill Theatre Company	
2015; 2017	The Present	Kirill	Sydney Theatre Company; Ethel Barrymore Theatre, Broadway debut	

== Awards and nominations ==
Year	Work	Award	Category	Result	Ref.
2015	Carlotta	AACTA Awards	Best Guest or Supporting Actor in a Television Drama	Won	
2015	Switzerland	Sydney Theatre Awards	Best Actor in a Leading Role in a Mainstream Production	Nominated	
2010	Eamon Farren	Australians in Film	Heath Ledger Scholarship	Runner-up	
