= The Bleeding Tree =

Play by Angus Cerini

The Bleeding Tree is a play by Australian writer Angus Cerini.

== Productions ==
In 2015 the Griffin Theatre Company in Sydney premiered The Bleeding Tree, directed by Lee Lewis and featuring Paula Arundell, Airlie Dodds, and Shari Sebbens.

It was remounted for a Sydney Theatre Company season at the Wharf 1 Theatre in 2017.

== Awards ==
- 2014: Griffin Award (before production)
- 2016: David Williamson Prize for Excellence in Writing for Australian Theatre
- 2016: Griffin's production received the Helpmann Award for Best Play
- 2016/7?: Two other Helpmann Awards
- 2017:Sydney Theatre Award
