= Harmony (2018 film) =

2018 film by Corey Pearson

- The Five Frequencies Saga: Part One
- Directed by: Corey Pearson
- Written by: Corey Pearson
- Produced by: Peter Drinkwater; Corey Pearson; Abi Tabone; Gemma Knight; Carly Bojadziski
- Starring: Jessica Falkholt; Jerome Meyer; Eamon Farren; Paula Arundell; Jacqueline McKenzie
- Cinematography: Brendan Gribble
- Edited by: Scott Keanie
- Music by: Tai Rotem
- Production companies: Cowlick Entertainment; Film Grit; Rhythmic Films
- Release date: 4 October 2018 (Australia)
- Running time: 97 minutes
- Country: Australia
- Language: English

Harmony (subtitled The Five Frequencies Saga: Part One), titled Immortal World in UK and Absolution in Canada and the USA, is an Australian fantasy thriller film released on 4 October 2018, and is the sole film appearance of Jessica Falkholt, who was killed in a car accident while the film was in post-production.

Written and directed by Corey Pearson, the film is the first of a planned five-part saga, entitled The Five Frequencies Saga, which follow five orphans as they learn to develop their own unique powers in order to save humanity.

== Plot ==
Harmony centers on the titular 21-year-old homeless woman, played by Jessica Falkholt, who can absorb fear from anyone that she comes in contact with. Manifesting within her as a black liquid, the fear can then be washed off with water, but absorbing too much fear can kill her.

Harmony meets Mason, played by Jerome Meyer, a socially awkward man who is seemingly void of fear. Relieved that she can feel no pain with him, she falls in love. However, she soon crosses paths with Jimmy, played by Eamon Farren, whose evil presence exudes fear. After a near-death experience, Harmony and Mason must unite to balance the growing negative energy.

== Cast ==
- Jessica Falkholt as Harmony
- Jerome Meyer as Mason
- Eamon Farren as Jimmy
- Paula Arundell as Nurse Jean
- Jacqueline McKenzie as Beth Miller
- Tiriel Mora as Homeless Guy

== Production ==
Filming for Harmony began in August 2016 around Sydney and the Illawarra region. Before filming, producers had a read-through with several focus groups to get feedback from the public. Filming reportedly took five weeks.

== Reception ==
Harmony received negative reviews. Prior to Harmony's release on 4 October 2018, Jake Wilson of The Sydney Morning Herald said of the film that "this amateurish local try at a fantasy for teenagers is a transparently bad movie, but bad in a disorientating, vaguely psychedelic way, obeying laws peculiarly its own." David Stratton of The Australian described it as "one of those irritating local films in which all the Australian actors adopt American accents."

== See also ==
- Cinema of Australia
