= Carlotta (film) =

2014 film

- Written by: David Hannam
- Directed by: Samantha Lang
- Starring: Jessica Marais; Anita Hegh; Eamon Farren
- Music by: Michael Yezerski
- Country of origin: Australia
- Original language: English

Production
- Producers: Riccardo Pellizzeri, Lara Radulovich
- Cinematography: Toby Oliver
- Editor: Nicholas Beauman
- Running time: 91 minutes

Original release
- Network: ABC
- Release: 2014

Carlotta is a 2014 Australian telemovie biopic about the life of pioneering transgender performer Carol Kaye, also known as Carlotta.

== Plot summary ==
In 1950s Sydney, a young transgender girl who will later name herself Carol Kaye (Kai Lewins) is being raised as "Richard Byron." She begins to express a feminine identity in childhood as she performs the song "'S Wonderful" for her parents. Both react negatively, with her mother disapproving and her father violently abusing her. Undeterred, Carol continues discreetly wearing feminine clothes but the situation does not improve.

In the 1960s, an adult Carol (Jessica Marais) gets a job at a department store and is introduced to a colleague named Ava (Eamon Farren), known also as "Danny." Recognising a kindred spirit, Ava encourages Carol to develop a feminine fashion sense and introduces her to a new circle of friends involved in Sydney's burgeoning drag scene. Over time, Carol builds confidence in herself and moves out of home to pursue her new life, much to the disapproval of her parents. Carol and her friends are also subject to police harassment on public indecency charges on a number of occasions. She begins hormone replacement therapy and undergoes breast augmentation.

In an important career milestone, Carol performs "S Wonderful" again to audition for underworld figure Sammy Lee's (Alan Dukes) new Les Girls revue in Kings Cross and is successful. Lee gives Carol the stage name "Carlotta." The same day, she finds out that her father has left her mother and her mother has attempted an overdose, blaming Carlotta for what has happened. She continues at Les Girls and becomes increasingly successful.

In the 1970s, Carol successfully undergoes gender reassignment surgery at the Prince of Wales Hospital and returns to her performing career. Later, she finds that Ava has tragically died from an overdose. She then meets and becomes involved with a man named Peter (Ryan Johnson), eventually disclosing to him that she is transgender and performs at Les Girls. He initially reacts negatively but is persuaded to stay with her, and later proposes marriage which she accepts. Carol then quits showbiz and cancels a planned performance in London to begin a quiet life in the suburbs. After a few years, tensions begin to arise in their relationship because Carol physically cannot have children. She leaves Peter, who remarries and has a child with a cis woman. When the child is baptised, Carlotta discreetly attends and wishes Peter the best.

Carlotta then returns to Les Girls, and sees her young self reflected in a backstage mirror before she goes out on stage. In her opening monologue, she reflects on her career and concludes that "it's all about love (and) the only person whose love really matters is mine." The film ends with her performing Shirley Bassey's "This is My Life."

== Cast ==
- Jessica Marais as Carol / Carlotta / "Richard"
- Anita Hegh as Evelyn Byron
- Eamon Farren as Ava / "Danny"
- Andrew Lees as Peggy
- Socratis Otto as Christopher
- Alex Dimitriades as Angelo
- Ryan Johnson as Peter
- Caroline O'Connor as Shelia
- Alan Dukes as Sammy
- Paul Capsis as Stefan
- Damian de Montemas as Lance
- Gigi Edgley as Jane
- Geneviève Lemon as Faye
- Warwick Young as Ted
- Kai Lewins as Young Carol / Carlotta / "Richard"

== Reception ==
Melinda Houston of The Canberra Times gave it 3 stars concluding "The result is a story that treats its challenging subject matter seriously and respectfully, but in a way that's still accessible, engaging, often funny and ultimately uplifting." Writing in The Australian Graeme Blundell gave it the pick of the day saying "This quite brilliant ABC biopic — the story of how a working-class boy called Richard Byron grew up to become a famous showgirl, a Kings Cross legend, and a courageous symbol of generational change, pushing the boundaries of sexuality and gender — turns out to be a surprisingly tender fairy story." The Age's Ben Pobjie gives it a positive review stating "It's a brave effort, and kudos is due to all involved for producing a biopic whose emotional strength is powerfully affecting from the first scenes of young Richard, played by the superb Kai Lewins."

== Awards ==
- 4th AACTA Awards
  - Best Guest or Supporting Actor in a Television Drama - Eamon Farren - won
  - Best Production Design in Television - Murray Picknett - won
  - Best Costume Design in Television - Jenny Miles - won
  - Best Telefeature or Miniseries - Riccardo Pellizzeri, Lara Radulovich - nominated
  - Best Cinematography in Television - Toby Oliver - nominated
- Logie Awards of 2015
  - Most Popular Actress - Jessica Marais (also for Love Child) - nominated
  - Most Outstanding Miniseries or Telemovie - nominated
  - Most Outstanding Actress - Jessica Marais - nominated
