= The Leading Man =

- UK DVD cover
- Directed by: John Duigan
- Written by: Virginia Duigan
- Produced by: Paul Raphael; Bertil Ohlsson
- Starring: Jon Bon Jovi; Anna Galiena; Lambert Wilson; Thandiwe Newton; Patricia Hodge; Diana Quick; Harriet Walter; David Warner
- Music by: Edward Shearmur
- Distributed by: Guild Pathé Cinema
- Release dates: 6 September 1996 (Canada); 22 May 1997 (Australia); 12 September 1997 (UK)
- Running time: 100 minutes
- Country: United Kingdom
- Language: English
- Box office: $60,000

The Leading Man is a 1996 British romantic drama film directed by John Duigan. It premiered at the Toronto International Film Festival in 1996 but was not released in the United States until March 1998. The film is set in London in the winter.

== Plot ==
A brash American actor, Robin Grange, goes to London to feature in a major new play. The playwright of the production, Felix Webb, is having an intense affair with the leading lady, Hilary Rule. His wife of fourteen years, Elena, suspects that her husband is cheating and cannot suppress her rage. Robin comes up with an intriguing plan; to seduce Felix's elegant wife to end hassling her husband. In desperation, Felix agrees, but soon faces a dilemma in that he feels increasingly jealous of Robin's attempts to seduce his willing wife, especially when he charms (and attempts to seduce) Hilary and the other members of the production and becomes too popular at Felix's expense. Felix is caught in a web of deceit and jealousy, prompting him to seek revenge on the opening night of his new production.

== Cast ==
- Jon Bon Jovi as Robin Grange
- Anna Galiena as Elena Webb
- Lambert Wilson as Felix Webb
- Thandiwe Newton as Hilary Rule (credited as Thandie Newton)
- Barry Humphries as Humphrey Beal
- Patricia Hodge as Delvene
- Diana Quick as Susan
- Harriet Walter as Liz Flett
- David Warner as Tod

== Reception ==
On Rotten Tomatoes the film holds a 69% approval rating, based on 16 reviews with an average rating of 6.2/10. While enjoying performances by most of the cast, critics have given the film mixed reviews. Film4 argued about whether it is considered to be a comedy, drama or both, with neither making a large impression. The New York Times reviewed the film as "watchable without being gripping". Roger Ebert rated it 3 out of 4, "But the climax does not, I'm afraid, do justice to the setup."

The film only grossed £24,860 ($40,000) in the United Kingdom. It also performed poorly in the United States with a gross of only $18,012.

== Music ==
- The film's soundtrack is "Forever Love" by Gary Barlow.
