= Careless Love (film) =

- Theatrical release poster
- Directed by: John Duigan
- Written by: John Duigan
- Produced by: Geoff Burton; Jenny Day
- Starring: Nammi Le; David Field; Peter O'Brien
- Cinematography: Kathryn Milliss
- Edited by: Mark Warner
- Production companies: Luminous Pictures; Spirited Films
- Distributed by: Antidote Films
- Release date: 17 May 2012
- Running time: 105 minutes
- Country: Australia
- Language: English

Careless Love is a 2012 Australian drama film written and directed by John Duigan. The story centers on a university student who secretly works as an escort.

It was Duigan's first movie in Australia since 1994's Sirens. It was made entirely with private finance and took 30 days to shoot.

== Cast ==
- Nammi Le as Linh
- Penny McNamee as Carol
- Ivy Mak as Mint
- David Field as Dion
- Hugo Johnstone-Burt as Seb
- Yukata Izumihara as Masahiko, Japanese client
- John Duigan as University Lecturer
- Jeff Truman as Client with Dog
- Peter O'Brien as Luke
- Ian Gilmour as Detective
- Susan Prior as Lee
- Celeste Dodwell as Imogen
- David Roberts as Mr Stevenson
- Eamon Farren as Patrick

== See also ==
- Cinema of Australia
