= Paula Arundell =

Australian actress and singer

- Born: Australia
- Education: National Institute of Dramatic Art (1995)
- Occupations: Actress, singer
- Years active: 1997–present

Paula Arundell is an Australian actress and singer.

== Early life ==
Arundell studied at the National Institute of Dramatic Art (NIDA), in Sydney. She graduated in 1995, with a degree in Performing Arts (Acting).

== Career ==
Arundell has appeared in television roles, beginning with guest roles in Water Rats and Murder Call in 1997. She landed a main role as Claire in Children’s Hospital that same year.

She also had recurring roles as Gina in Love My Way (2004–05), Paula Gill in Home and Away (2009) and Sheriff Waller in the miniseries Reckoning (2019–2020).

She appeared in the series Hunters in 2016, and had further guest roles in All Saints, Farscape, The Alice, Out of the Blue and miniseries Clickbait. In 2021, Arundell joined the cast of Neighbours as Evelyn Farlow for a two-week guest stint. Her most recent television roles have been guest spots in Surviving Summer and The Newsreader.

Arundell's films have included 1998 comedy Dags, 2000 alternative drama Sample People (with Ben Mendelsohn and Kylie Minogue), 2008 drama Disgrace (alongside John Malkovich), 2016 fantasy action film Gods of Egypt (alongside Gerard Butler) and 2018 fantasy thriller Harmony. Her most recent roles have been in 2023 supernatural horror film Late Night with the Devil and 2024 crime thriller Sleeping Dogs (with Russell Crowe).

As a singer, Arundell performed a version of the Tim Buckley song "Song to the Siren", which was used in the 2006 Neil Armfield film Candy.

She voiced Sonic the Hedgehog in the Sonic Live in Sydney theme park. She has also narrated 2020 documentary Cute Little Killers.

Arundell has performed extensively in theatre and has won and been nominated for several awards. She played an older Hermione Granger in the Melbourne production of Harry Potter and the Cursed Child, which saw her nominated for a 2019 Helpmann Award.

== Filmography ==
=== Film ===
Year	Title	Role	Notes
1997	Diana & Me	Constable	Feature film
1998	Dags	Tracey	Feature film
2000	Sample People	Cleo	Feature film
2003	Bad Eggs	Simone	Feature film
2003	Silent Storm	Narrator	Documentary film
2008	Disgrace	Dr. Farodia Rassool	Feature film
2011	The Cartographer	Polly (voice)	Short film
2016	Gods of Egypt	Fussy Older Maidservant	Feature film
2018	Harmony	Nurse Jean	Feature film
2023	Late Night with the Devil	Diane	Feature film
2024	Sleeping Dogs	Susan Avery	Feature film

=== Television ===
Year	Title	Role	Notes	Ref
1997	Water Rats	Michelle	Season 2, episode 11: "Goldie's Trip"	
1997	Murder Call	Rebecca Voss	Season 1, episode 2: "The Burial"	
1997	Children's Hospital	Claire		
1998; 2004; 2009	All Saints	Officer Wilson / Simone Birchley / Nura Arkuna	3 episodes	
2003	Farscape	Talikaa	Season 4, episode 14: "Twice Shy"	
2004–2005	Love My Way	Gina	Season 1, 7 episodes	
2005	The Alice	Lara	Miniseries, 1 episode	
2008	Out of the Blue	Simone	Season 1, episode 22	
2009	Home and Away	Paula Gill	7 episodes	
2011	Me and My Monsters		Season 2, episode 6: "Monstrously Good Cookies"	
2011	Slide	Kat	Season 1, episode 3	
2013	The Time of Our Lives	Chelsea	Season 1, episode 7: "The Mistake"	
2016	Hunters	Liana / Lauren	5 episodes	
2019–2020	Reckoning	Sheriff Waller	Miniseries, 7 episodes	
2020	Cute Little Killers	Narrator	Documentary	
2021	Clickbait	Tanisha	Miniseries, episode 7: "The Son"	
2021	Neighbours	Evelyn Farlow	5 episodes	
2023	Surviving Summer	Jacqueline Laurent	Season 1, episode 8: "The Stairway"	
2023	The Newsreader	Nadia	Season 2, episode 4: "The Hungry Truth"	
2026	The F Ward	Anita Corcoran	TV series: 6 episodes	

=== Audio ===
Year	Title	Role	Notes
1997	Sonic Live in Sydney	Sonic the Hedgehog	Short audio play

== Theatre ==
Year	Title	Role	Venue / Co.
1993	Cosi	Cherry	NIDA, Sydney
1994	The Wedding Song		NIDA, Sydney
1994	Translations	Marie	NIDA, Sydney
1994	Twelfth Night	Viola	NIDA, Sydney
1994	Epsom Downs	Miss Motrom	NIDA, Sydney
1994	Stone		NIDA, Sydney
1995	Tales from the Vienna Woods	Marianne	NIDA, Sydney
1995	Guys and Dolls	Mimi / Dancer	NIDA, Sydney
1995	Ghetto	The Dummy	NIDA, Sydney
1995	The Love of Don Perlimplín and Belisa in the Garden		NIDA, Sydney
1996	Much Ado About Nothing	Hero	Melbourne Athenaeum, Sydney Opera House, Canberra Theatre with Bell Shakespeare
1996	The Torrents	Jenny	Playhouse, Adelaide with STCSA
1997	The Tempest	Ariel	Canberra Theatre, Her Majesty's Theatre, Adelaide, Sydney Opera House, Melbourne Athenaeum with Bell Shakespeare
1998	Clark in Sarajevo		Stables Theatre, Sydney with Griffin Theatre Company
1998	Love for Love		Sydney Opera House with STC
1999	Interactive World Theatre		Ensemble Theatre, Sydney
1999	Henry V	The Boy / Princess Katherine	Melbourne Athenaeum, Playhouse, Canberra, Sydney Opera House with Bell Shakespeare
2000	Company	Marta	Playhouse, Melbourne, with MTC
2000	Measure for Measure	Isabella	Playhouse, Melbourne, with MTC
2000	The White Devil	Zanche	Theatre Royal Sydney with STC for Olympic Arts Festivals
2000	Attempts on Her Life		STC
2001	Three Sisters	Masha	Sydney Opera House with STC
2001	Antony and Cleopatra	Cleopatra	Sydney Opera House, IMB Theatre, Wollongong, Playhouse, Melbourne, Playhouse, Canberra, Riverside Theatres, Parramatta with Bell Shakespeare
2002	Hippolytus		Government House, Sydney with Bell Shakespeare
2002	Life Is a Dream	Rosaura	Sydney Opera House with STC
2003	Beasty Grrrl	Carla	Devonport Entertainment and Convention Centre
2003	The Servant of Two Masters	Smeraldina	Playhouse, Brisbane, Riverside Theatres Parramatta, Monash University, The Capital, Bendigo, Clocktower Centre, Melbourne, with Bell Shakespeare
2003	The Threepenny Opera	Jenny Diver	Belvoir Street Theatre, Sydney
2004	Night Letters	Camilla / Jane	Queen's Theatre, Adelaide, Malthouse Theatre, Melbourne, with STCSA & Playbox Theatre Company
2005	Three Furies: Scenes from the Life of Francis Bacon	Tisiphone	Sydney Opera House, Auckland with Griffin Theatre Company
2005	Julius Caesar		Wharf Theatre with Sydney Theatre Company
2006	Kookaburra Launch Concert	Singer	Lyric Theatre, Sydney
2006	Peribanez		Seymour Centre, Sydney
2006	Are You There?	Ana	Ensemble Theatre, Sydney
2007	The Adventures of Snugglepot and Cuddlepie and Little Ragged Blossom	Wallaby / Mrs Snake	Theatre Royal Sydney
2007	Paul	Mary Magdalene	Belvoir Street Theatre, Sydney
2007	Love Lies Bleeding	Lia	Wharf Theatre, Glen Street Theatre with STC
2007	Blackbird	Una	Wharf Theatre, Shed 6, Wellington, New Zealand with STC
2008	Scorched	Jihane	Belvoir Street Theatre, Sydney
2009	Gethsemane	Monique Toussaint	Belvoir Street Theatre, Sydney
2010	Oedipus Rex & Symphony of Psalms	Antigone / Narrator	Sydney Opera House
2010	Honour	Claudia	Sydney Opera House with STC
2012	Under Milk Wood	Polly Garter	Sydney Opera House with STC
2012	Death of a Salesman		Theatre Royal Sydney
2013	Peter Pan	Mrs Darling	
2013	Angels in America	The Angel / Emily	Theatre Royal Sydney, Belvoir Street Theatre, Sydney
2014	Clybourne Park	Francine	Ensemble Theatre, Sydney, The Concourse, Sydney
2014	Macbeth	Banquo	Sydney Theatre with STC
2015	Suddenly Last Summer	Sister Felicity	Sydney Opera House with STC
2015	Mother Courage and Her Children	Yvette	Belvoir Street Theatre, Sydney
2015; 2017; 2018	The Bleeding Tree	Mother	Stables Theatre, Sydney with Griffin Theatre Company, Wharf Theatre with STC, Canberra Theatre Centre
2016	Disgraced	Jory	Wharf Theatre with Sydney Theatre Company, IMB Theatre, Wollongong, Playhouse, Canberra with STC
2016	A Midsummer Night’s Dream	Hippolyta / Titania	Sydney Opera House with STC
2017	Mr. Burns, a Post-Electric Play	Marge / Quincy / various roles	Space Theatre, Adelaide, Belvoir Street Theatre, Sydney, with STCSA
2017	The Real and Imagined History of the Elephant Man		Malthouse Theatre, Melbourne
2017	Atlantis	Electra / Cuban Man / Choir Leader / Cowgirl Mum / various roles	Belvoir Street Theatre, Sydney
2018	Top Girls	Griselda	Sydney Opera House with STC
2018	Sami in Paradise	Fima / Fairuz	Belvoir Street Theatre, Sydney
2019; 2022	Harry Potter and the Cursed Child	Hermione Granger	Princess Theatre, Melbourne
2020	Belvoir in Concert		Online, Australia
2023	The Master and Margarita	Woland / Ensemble	Belvoir Street Theatre, Sydney
2024	Death of a Salesman	The Woman	Theatre Royal Sydney
2024	Carousel: A Concert	Mrs Mullin	Princess Theatre, Melbourne with Enda Markey Presents
2024	Sweat	Cynthia	Wharf Theatre, Sydney, with STC
2024	POTUS: Or, Behind Every Great Dumbass Are Seven Women Trying to Keep Him Alive	Margaret, The First Lady	Queensland Theatre (cancelled)
2025	The Birds		Malthouse Theatre, Melbourne
2025	Troy		Malthouse Theatre, Melbourne
2025	Nucleus	Cassie	Seymour Centre, Sydney, with Griffin Theatre Company

== Awards and nominations ==
Year	Work	Award	Category	Result
	The Tempest	Green Room Awards	Best Female Actor in a Supporting Role	Won
1999	Henry V	Glugs Theatrical Awards	Best Up and Coming Actor	Won
	Henry V	Green Room Awards	Best Female Actor in a Featured Role	Won
2004	The Threepenny Opera	Helpmann Awards	Best Female Actor in Supporting Role in a Musical	Nominated
2005	Three Furies	Sydney Theatre Awards	Best Actress in a Supporting Role	Nominated
	Antony and Cleopatra	Sydney Morning Herald Awards	Best Actress	Won
	Antony and Cleopatra	Green Room Awards	Best Female Actor in a Lead Role	Nominated
2015	The Bleeding Tree	Sydney Theatre Awards	Best Actress in a Leading Role of a Mainstage Production	Nominated
2016	The Bleeding Tree	Helpmann Awards	Best Female Actor in a Play	Won
2019	The Bleeding Tree	Green Room Awards	Best Theatre Company Performer	Nominated
2019	Harry Potter and the Cursed Child	Helpmann Awards	Best Female Actor in a Play	Nominated
