= Jess Warner =

- Wentworth character
- First appearance: "The Danger Within"
- Last appearance: "Blood and Fire"
- Created by: Lara Radulovich
- Portrayed by: Georgia Chara
- Duration: 2014–15
- Status: Deceased; strangled by Joan Ferguson
- Crime: Assault
- Sentence: 5 years

In-universe information
- Full name: Jessica Warner
- Nickname: Jess
- Occupation: Child Minder (formerly)
- Significant other: Matthew Fletcher
- Nationality: Australian

Jessica Warner is a fictional character from the Australian television series Wentworth, portrayed by Georgia Chara. She made her first appearance during the season episode "The Danger Within," broadcast on 10 June 2014. Jess was murdered in the final episode of the third season.

== Storylines ==
=== Backstory ===
The character's birth date was 9 July 1995. Bea (Danielle Cormack) bribed Linda Miles to do some digging on the new inmates, Linda told Bea that Jess’ record was sealed. Bea later confronted Jess in which Jess reveals that she was accused of murdering a child but was wrongly blamed. It was revealed in the season three finale that Jess did actually murder the baby.

=== 2014–15 ===
Jess is introduced in The Danger Within. When she is being processed by Will Jackson, Jess seems childish and insecure. When Will calls for assistance Jess quickly develops control of her emotions. Later in the episode after learning that her record was sealed, Bea attacked Jess believing that Jess was the hitman for the Holts.

Jess is briefly seen talking about Boomer and Franky's drug trafficking in the garden project in the dining room with Maxine.

In Sins of the Mother, Jess is attacked and stuck in a washing machine by Franky as Franky believes her to be the lagger.

Jess has sex with Matthew Fletcher in the shower rooms at Bea's request so she can get his pass card to retrieve a knife. Jess then watches in horror throughout Bea and Franky's battle.

Jess watches on as Franky announces that Bea is now top dog.

Throughout season three, Jess slowly becomes obsessed with Doreen being pregnant and then with the newly born baby Joshua. To estrange Doreen from Liz, Jess places bottles of alcohol in Liz's cell. When that plan fails, she attempts to make Doreen look like a bad mother.

After being told that she wouldn't be alternate carer, Jess kidnaps baby Joshua while Doreen is asleep. Jess attempts to smother Josh until she is stopped by Joan Ferguson, who strangles Jess to death and then covers up the death by burning her body. The fire rips through Cell Block H as Joan is arrested for her crimes.

Jess is later mentioned in the third episode of season 4, where Joan meets with Doreen while she is remanded at Wentworth Prison. Joan claims that Jess started the fire when Joan tried to take Josh away from her and that she perished in the blaze. This manipulation wins over Doreen's trust such that she foils an attack on Joan in the exercise yard.

Jess appeared to be inspired by the character of Lynn Warner from the first season of Prisoner. Sharing the same last name, both women are known for crying a lot and declaring their innocence. Both were accused of harming a child, but Lynn was not actually guilty of alleged attempted child murder.

== Reception ==
When talking about who was the hitman against Bea, the Metro described Jess as "seemingly timid" and also stated "aside from blatantly fancying prison guard Fletch, is hiding a secret"

Geelong Advertiser described Jess as "a frightened, yet seductive prisoner" in an article talking about actress Chara.

In a review for Wentworth's third season, the reviewer described Jess as "creepy as ever".

Chara was included on the long-list for the Logie Award for Best New Talent for her role as Warner.

An AfterEllen review discussed Jess and said "I think it’s partly because she’s such an effective wolf in sheep’s clothing, whereas every other villain proudly owns their evil. But mostly it’s Georgia Chara’s performance, which combines tenderness and ruthlessness in a way I’ve never seen before. WAIT. Yes I have. Jess is like that bunny rabbit in Monty Python and the Holy Grail, that no one has the good sense to be afraid of because it looks so cute and sweet and innocent."
