= Maxine Conway =

- Wentworth character
- First appearance: "The Danger Within"
- Last appearance: "The B*tch Is Back"
- Portrayed by: Socratis Otto
- Duration: 2014–2017

In-universe information
- Full name: Max Conway (birth)
- Affiliation: Bea Smith; Wentworth Prison
- Significant other: Gary

Maxine Conway (formerly Max) is a recurring character from Wentworth, portrayed by actor Socratis Otto. Maxine is notable for being Bea Smith's (Danielle Cormack) bodyguard and also for being transgender within the series. She was dating Gary until she stabbed him.

During the fourth episode of the fourth season, Maxine is diagnosed with breast cancer.

Episode 2 of Season 5 saw Maxine's departure to a facility that is specially equipped to treat her cancer.

== Background ==
The backstory given by Wentworth's website states "Maxine is a male-to-female transgender person who, despite having undergone gender reassignment surgery and wearing a wig and make-up, looks unambiguously male. Devastated after being rejected by her boyfriend following her surgery, Maxine responded by stabbing him resulting in her doing time in Wentworth."

== Characterisation ==
Otto said in an interview with What's on TV that Maxine was "a totally innocent bird".

Otto claimed in an interview that Maxine was a "loyal disciple" to top dog Bea.

Speaking to the interviewer for Female First, Otto stated, "For me Daniel it was trying to not necessarily educate but just to present a character, a transgender that would make audiences question their own approach and their own stereotypes about transsexuals."

Otto has been able to compare Maxine to Boomer he said, "Booms has no filter. Although the huge similarity she shares with Maxine is that they've both grown up feeling and being told they don't belong, mocked, outsiders. They're both essentially abandoned children simply pining for love."

In an interview with Gay Times, Otto said, "When I signed up I had an inkling because I knew it was reliant on intense characters and drama. By season three, once Maxine gets completely accepted, she aligns herself with Bea and we see a whole new side of her personality. She becomes sassy, confident and strong, and later you see a lot of the comedy coming out between Maxine and Boomer. I think Maxine recognised herself in Boomer; the little lost person who just wants to be loved and is not part of the norm."

When interviewed by Herald Sun, Otto said, "The beautiful irony is that Maxine is much more of a woman than many of the female characters on Wentworth because of what she represents in terms of what we perceive a woman to be. She is a nurturer, she is sensitive, a mother, loyal, independent, virtuous, she is a survivor."

=== Look and Design ===
Otto stated in an interview that he disliked the nails he had for the role. Asked how the show's creators gave him a woman's body, Otto said, "It's crazy from the neck down. I have special trans-gender underwear, which accentuates the physique so I've got butt implants and hips, not to mention my chicken fillets. Everyone at work is very jealous because I've had different looks throughout the season. But the make-up does take longer than the others." Otto said that he had negative preconceptions about the trans community until he did research for the role.

=== Cancer ===
In the episode "Screw Lover", Maxine is diagnosed with cancer. Otto said in an interview, "It is an estrogen sensitive cancer that any woman can get and men can get breast cancer as well and there is not enough information out there. For me, the story is about who am I in the face of a life or death situation and what do my family and friends reveal to me and we are much more than our gender at the end of the day." Otto thought it was an "incredibly brave" subject matter, and "it was very beautiful and emotional". He said that the writers had given Maxine the biggest confrontation to deal with in that season.

== Storylines ==
Maxine is one of the new prisoners transferred to Wentworth. She is seen with Jess Warner and a woman who was planning on killing Bea. In the showers, Maxine saves Bea by punching the woman carrying out a hit ordered by the Holts. On her entry to the prison, Maxine was crowded by transphobic comments.

In "Metamorphosis", Maxine makes an escape attempt but does not get past the gates because she is apprehended by Will Jackson and Vera Bennett. Maxine no longer has her wig after this episode because Vera refuses to give it back to her.

In "The Fixer", due to Maxine giving Jess urine for Doreen to use to beat a pregnancy test, Ferguson (Pamela Rabe) cuts the hormone medications to Maxine as punishment. Maxine infiltrates Franky Doyle's (Nicole da Silva) gang.

In "Into The Night", Maxine helps Bea get a knife but it is then discovered by Franky. Maxine watches the fight between Franky and Bea.

In "Fear Her", Maxine is briefly seen being quizzed by Ferguson about Bea's whereabouts due to an escape. Other brief scenes are when she discusses Bea's escape with Jess, watching the news of Bea's capture and Brayden's death with other prisoners and is also seen when Franky tells the prison that Bea is top dog.

In "The Governor's Pleasure", Maxine follows Bea's orders to create a riot and make a fire in the yard. Maxine leads the prisoners against the officers until Bea arrives. Throughout the third season, Maxine helps Bea loyally in the fight against Ferguson.

In Failing Upwards, Maxine holds Boomer's hands down when Bea burns her. Maxine also makes a comment that she has never had pizza for breakfast when she was helping delivering the pizzas that Bea had got the other prisoners.

In "Righteous Acts", Maxine is angry when Bea gets knifed, Maxine attacks Jodie Speteri to find out why she did it. Maxine and Bea then learned that Ferguson has been manipulating her.

In "Freak Show", when Bea is questioning giving up her role of top dog, Maxine reminds Bea that she promised to take down Ferguson at whatever cost.

In "Blood and Fire", Maxine watches in shock and fear when Bea and Franky run into the burning prison to rescue Doreen's baby Josh.

== Reception ==
Otto noted in an interview that he did not think Wentworth would have gained that much global attention. Otto said that he enjoyed playing a transgender character.

A reporter for the Metro noted that Maxine was one of the show's most liked characters.

The Daily Telegraph said that Otto was "unrecognisable in his new role playing transgender prisoner Maxine Conway".

Maxine has been noted as "a transgender character, overcame massive boundaries to become one of the strongest and most likable characters." by Metro.

A writer on AfterEllen, compared Maxine to Sophia Burset, the transgender character on Orange Is The New Black played by Laverne Cox. The writer said "The wig thing makes sense, I guess, if she has been off her hormones for a while, but that issue is never addressed. Every single scene with Maxine is about her difference, her otherness. And I’m actually fine with the rest of the characters saying shitty things to her that reduce her to her anatomy–they’re not the most enlightened people ever—but the camera seems to treat her with the same crassness as the inmates."

Gay Times said about Maxine "She’s one of the reasons our eyes are so fixated to the dramatic happenings of season three and we love it." when talking about the character before interviewing Socratis Otto about his time in Wentworth Prison.

During the story where the Holt's had a hit out on Bea for the attack of Brayden, Metro described Maxine who was one of the hitmen suspects as "Transgendered Maxine Conway certainly raises some eyebrows and suspicion".

Elaine Atwell stated about Maxine's cancer storyline, "It turns out that the ONE DAY she was forced to act as Top Dog was the day her cancer decided to metastasize. Now it’s in both her breasts and her lymph nodes, and she’s facing a double mastectomy. Which: that is ridiculous and not how disease works, but we’re just going to have to prop up our disbelief on stilts if it won’t suspend itself."
