= Socratis Otto =

Australian actor (1974-)

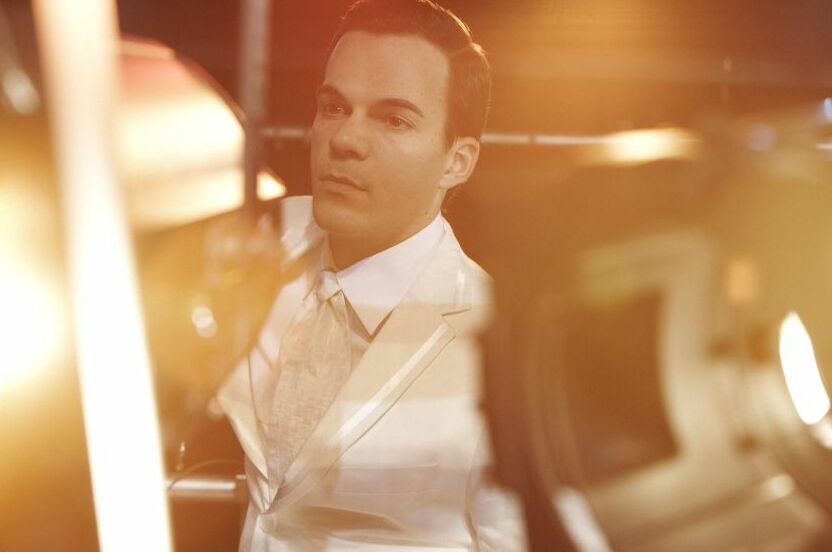
- Born: 5 May 1974 (age 52); Sydney, Australia
- Occupation: Actor
- Years active: 2001–present (Actor, Director and Producer)
- Known for: Wentworth; Home And Away

Socratis Otto is an Australian film, theatre and television actor. He is best known for his roles in television series Young Lions as Justin Carmody, Home and Away as Robert Robertson, and Wentworth as Maxine Conway.

== Early life ==
Otto is the son of first-generation Greek immigrants, and was born and raised in Sydney, New South Wales. He completed a degree in creative writing and literature before studying acting at NIDA (National Institute of Dramatic Art), graduating in 2000.

== Career ==
=== Theatre ===
Otto began his career in the 2001 Sydney Theatre Company's play Salt. In 2009, Otto would play Woyzeck in the play of the same name at the Malthouse. A year later in 2010, Otto performed in Stockholm alongside Leeanna Walsman. In 2019, Otto appeared in the play Baby Doll. In 2023, Otto returned to Ensemble Theatre for the play Suddenly Last Summer.

=== Television ===
Otto had a guest role in Australian children's television series Outriders in 2001 followed by a leading role in drama series Young Lions in 2002 as Justin Carmody.

In 2009, Otto played the lead role of Charles Darwin in drama-documentary Darwin's Brave New World.

He appeared in television series Dance Academy in 2010 as Adam the Psychologist and in 2011 had a guest stint on Home and Away as Detective Robert Robertson. This was followed by guest roles in television series Rake, The Doctor Blake Mysteries and Serangoon Road.

In 2013, he appeared in the mini-series Paper Giants: Magazine Wars as Peter Dawson and in the 2014 telemovie Carlotta as Christopher.

In 2014 he joined the cast of Wentworth in the role of trans woman prison inmate Maxine Conway (formerly Max), Otto departed from the series in 2017.

Otto made later television appearances in Operation Buffalo, ReCancelled and more. Otto also acted in and directed the mini series HomeSpun.

=== Film ===
Otto appeared in the 2003 movie The Matrix Reloaded. This was followed by X-Men Origins: Wolverine, The Rage in Placid Lake and Beautiful. On 13 August 2025, Otto was named in the cast for the film Forever Young.

== Filmography ==
=== Film ===
Year	Title	Role	Notes
2002	Running Down These Dreams	Dove	Short film
2003	The Matrix Reloaded	Jax	Feature film
2003	The Rage in Placid Lake	Bozo	Feature film
2006	Macbeth	Detective Mentieth	Feature film
2008	Monkey Puzzle	Zac	Feature film
2008	Eleven	Tim	Short film
2008	The Last Confession of Alexander Pearce	Fine Young British Officer	Feature film
2008	Residue	Kyle	Short film
2009	Beautiful	Max	
2009	Beyond Words	Attacker	Short film
2009	X-Men Origins: Wolverine	Lead Technician - Alkali Lake	Feature film
2009	Nightwalking	Joe, Voices	Short film
2009	In Hearts Left Behind	Aden	Short film
2010	Anyone You Want	Stirling	
2012	Gone	Jim	Feature film
2014	I, Frankenstein	Zuriel	Feature film
2014	Carlotta	Christopher	TV film
2014	My Mistress	Leon	Feature film
2018	Enter The Wild	Zac	Feature film
2019	Electric	The Patient	Short film
2019	A Good Family	Marco	TV movie
2020	Mr Bubbles		Short film
2020	The Flood	Miller	
2024	Water Horse	Rick Hughes	
2024	Electric	The Patient	Short
2025	Songbird	Lenny	Short
TBA	Forever Young	Peter	Film

=== Television ===
Year	Title	Role	Notes
2001	Outriders	Jason	Episode: "Aliens: Part 4"
2001, 2004	All Saints	Adam Gray, Hugh	2 episodes
2002	Young Lions	Justin Carmody	15 episodes
2009	False Witness	Shannon Cross	
2009	Darwin's Brave New World	Charles Darwin	3 episodes
2009–2011	Home and Away	Robert Robertson	Seasons 22–24 (37 episodes)
2010	The Pacific	Father Keough	Episode: "Basilone"
2010	Miracles	Grand Ameseder	Episode: "Miracle in the Storm"
2010	Dance Academy	Adam The Psychologist	2 episodes
2012	Rake	Justin	Episode: "Greene vs. Hole"
2013	The Doctor Blake Mysteries	Clive Churchill	Episode: "Death of a Travelling Salesman"
2013	Paper Giants: Magazine Wars	Peter Dawson	2 episodes
2013	Serangoon Road	Peter Watson	Episode: "Give Me Money"
2014–2017	Wentworth	Maxine Conway	Recurring, Seasons 2–3; Main, Seasons 4–5 (36 episodes)
2019	Home and Away	Aiden Wilcox	Season 32
2020	Operation Buffalo	Terry Ryan MP	2 episodes
2021	Homespun	Farmer Matt	Actor / Director / Producer
2021	ReCancelled	Friend	1 episode
2021	Born to Spy	George Papadopoulos	3 episodes
2024	Nautilus	Harris	TV series

=== Video games ===
Year	Title	Role	Notes
2003	Enter the Matrix	Jax	

=== Theatre ===
Year	Title	Role	Notes	Ref
2023	Suddenly Last Summer	George Holly	Ensemble Theatre	
2019	Baby Doll	Silca Vacarro	Ensemble Theatre	
2010	Stockholm	Todd	Sydney Theatre Co	
2009	Woyzeck	Woyzeck	Malthouse Theatre	
