= Georgia Chara =

Australian actress

- Born: 30 July 1987 (age 38); Geelong, Australia
- Occupation: Actress
- Years active: 2009–present

Georgia Chara (born 30 July 1987) is an Australian television and theatre actress. After starting her acting career in her twenties, she made guest appearances in various television series', including Bed of Roses, Killing Time and Mr & Mrs Murder. In 2013, Chara was cast as Jess Lockwood in Home and Away. She also joined the cast of Wentworth in the starring role of Jess Warner. Chara appeared in the second and third seasons. In 2015, Chara starred as Wednesday in comedy series Sammy J & Randy in Ricketts Lane and made a guest appearance in Neighbours. She also made her stage debut in a production of Exit the King.

== Early life ==
Chara grew up on a farm in Bellbrae. During her teenage years, she moved to Highton and attended Sacred Heart College. For six months she studied finance at Deakin University, before dropping out. She then worked as a personal trainer in Torquay. When she was 20 years old, Chara joined the Screen Actors Studio and she also taught improvisation classes at Mooregrace Acting Studios.

== Career ==
Chara has made guest appearances in Rush, Bed of Roses, Killing Time, and Mr & Mrs Murder. In 2013, Chara was cast in the guest role of Jess Lockwood in Home and Away for six episodes. While she was filming for the Home and Away, Chara successfully auditioned for the recurring role of Jess Warner in the prison drama Wentworth. Chara described her character as "a wrongly accused and scared innocent girl". She made her debut in the second season, which aired in 2014.

Chara also joined the cast of feature film Before Dawn, alongside Samara Weaving and Marcus Graham. In 2015, Chara appeared in the third season of Wentworth and the ABC comedy show Sammy J & Randy in Ricketts Lane. She also joined the cast of Neighbours in the guest role of Indiana Crowe. Chara made her stage debut in a production of Eugène Ionesco's Exit the King at the Geelong Arts Centre. She played the female lead Queen Marguerite.

== Filmography ==
Year	Title	Role	Notes	Ref
2009	Rush	Student	Episode: "Season 2 Episode 15"	
2011	Bed of Roses	Bike Salesperson	Episode: "Heartache"	
2011	Killing Time	Charlene	Episode: "1.3"	
2013	Mr & Mrs Murder	Jennifer Travers	Episode: "A Flare for Murder"	
2013–14	Home and Away	Jess Lockwood	Guest role; Seasons 26–27	
2014–15	Wentworth	Jess Warner	Recurring role; Seasons 2–3	
2015	Sammy J & Randy in Ricketts Lane	Wednesday		
2015	Footballer Wants a Wife	Bella		
2015	Neighbours	Indiana Crowe	Guest role; Season 31	
2017	Living Space	Ashley		
2019	Ms Fisher's Modern Murder Mysteries	Julie Thomas	Episode: "Dead Beat"	
2024 (25)	Inside	Mel's Mother	Feature Film	

== Theatre ==
Year	Title	Role	Notes	Ref
2024	Misery	Annie Wilkes	Geelong Repertory Theatre Company	
2024	Between the Sheets	Lead	UK / AUS / US tour	
2023	Proof		Geelong Repertory Theatre Company	
2022	Some Girls		Woodbin Theatre	
2021	Forget Me Not	Sally	Geelong Repertory Theatre Company	
2018	A Doll's House	Nora Helmer	Geelong Repertory Theatre Company	
	Exit the King	Queen Marguerite	Geelong Arts Centre	
