= Craig Silvey =

Australian novelist

- Born: 1982 (age 43–44); Australia
- Occupation: Writer
- Years active: 2004–2026
- Notable work: Jasper Jones

Craig Silvey (born 1982) is an Australian novelist and convicted child exploitation material offender.

In his publishing career, Silvey was twice been named one of the Best Young Australian Novelists by The Sydney Morning Herald and was shortlisted for the International Dublin Literary Award. His 2009 second novel Jasper Jones was selected by the American Library Association as Best Fiction for Young Adults in their 2012 list, and was made into the movie of the same name in 2017.

In January 2026, Silvey was arrested and charged with producing, distributing, and two counts of possessing child exploitation material. He pleaded guilty to one count of possession and distribution in May 2026. Released on home bail, Silvey was sentenced to seven months in prison on 2 November 2026.

== Early life and education ==
Craig Silvey was born in 1982. He grew up in the south-west of Western Australia in a town called Dwellingup. His father was an industrial arts teacher, and his mother was a teacher-librarian.

Educated at the Independent Pioneer Village School, Silvey describes the experience as unusual in that it is located in Armadale's Pioneer Village which is an open-air museum;

in the style of an 1800s gold mining town with an old mine shaft... The girls had straw hats and big white socks, the boys had black cricket-style caps. Other than that it was standard private-school fare. The classes were small and the teachers great.

Silvey claimed he experienced "emotional neglect, violence and sexual abuse" as a child. He called his father "emotionally distant".

After completing secondary education at the independent Frederick Irwin Anglican School in Mandurah, he eschewed going to university and took on menial labouring and cleaning jobs to support his writing.

== Career ==
Silvey says of his literary influences:

I've always been attracted to Southern Gothic fiction. There's something very warm and generous about those regional American writers like Twain and Lee and Capote, and it seemed to be a literary ilk that would lend itself well to the Australian condition [...].

Australian authors Silvey admires include Shaun Tan, Markus Zusak, Christos Tsiolkas, Tim Winton, and Gail Jones.

Silvey published his first novel, Rhubarb, in 2004, after writing it when he was 19 years old. The reviewer on Booklover Book Reviews called it "one of the most original novels I have read", giving it an overall rating of 4.75 out of 5.

In 2007, he published a picture book for children, The World According to Warren, about a guide dog, with illustrations by Sonia Martinez.

Silvey's second novel Jasper Jones was completed in early 2008 with the aid of an Australia Council for the Arts New Work Grant. The novel was described as conforming "to the conventions of Australian Gothic, which projects contemporary experience onto... dysfunctional families in small, remote towns.... where young protagonists encounter violence or death, and where outsiders are punished for their difference". Jasper Jones is Silvey's most successful novel, selling half a million copies, and having won or been shortlisted for several prominent literary awards. A film adaptation of the novel, based on a screenplay written by Silvey and Shaun Grant, was released in 2017. The film was directed by Rachel Perkins and stars Toni Collette, Levi Miller, Aaron McGrath, and Angourie Rice.

In February 2017, it was announced that Silvey had written a screenplay for a film to be titled The Prospector, once again teaming up with Rachel Perkins, and backed by Screen Australia. A contemporary western set in Western Australia, the plot follows "a woman [who] risks everything to find her missing husband". There has been no update on this project.

Runt, a film based on Silvey's novel of the same name, was released in September 2024.

=== Post-criminal conviction ===
Following Silvey's guilty plea for possessing and distributing child exploitation material, Rhubarb publisher Fremantle Press announced they would cease promoting Silvey's works. Silvey's other publisher, Allen & Unwin, stated it would "review all available steps it can take to end its relationship with the author."

Major Australian booksellers Dymocks, Readings, and QBD removed his books from sale on their websites, and Dymocks removed all of his titles from their stores as well. All Australian state-education departments demanded or recommended that state schools remove his books from lessons whilst legal proceedings were underway.

Belvoir Theatre Company, who were working on a stage adaptation of Runt formerly due to open in August 2026, announced they had indefinitely paused work on the production.

== Recognition and awards ==
Rhubarb was selected as the inaugural book for the "One Book" series of events at the 2005 Perth International Arts Festival, and was included in the Australian national "Books Alive" campaign. It also placed Silvey on The Sydney Morning Herald Best Young Australian Novelists list in 2005.

In 2010, Silvey was once again named one of The Sydney Morning Herald Best Young Australian Novelists of the year.

Jasper Jones was selected by the American Library Association (ALA) as Best Fiction for Young Adults in their 2012 list, and was an "Honor book" in the Michael L. Printz Award in 2012 by the ALA. The novel was also shortlisted for the 2011 International Dublin Literary Award.

Silvey's 2020 novel Honeybee won the Fiction prize at the 2021 Indie Book Awards and was shortlisted for the 2021 Literary fiction book of the year at the Australian Book Industry Awards. In that year, Silvey delivered the Isabelle Lake Memorial Lecture, held in honour of a young transgender activist who died from leukaemia, hosted by the University of Western Australia and the Equal Opportunity Commission.

Runt won the Book of the Year and the Children's prize at the 2023 Indie Book Awards. It also won the Children's book award at the 2023 BookPeople Book of the Year Awards and the 2023 CBCA Children's Book of the Year Award: Younger Readers. Runt also won the 2024 Young Australian Best Book Award for Fiction for older readers.

The Tim Winton Young Writers Award, launched in 1992 and sponsored annually by the City of Subiaco until 2022, recognised young writers in the Perth metropolitan area. In 2023, Silvey became patron of the award, which was renamed the Craig Silvey Award for Young Writers.

In January 2026, after being charged with producing, distributing, and possessing child exploitation material, it was announced that Silvey would have no further association with the award named the Craig Silvey Award for Young Writers from 2023 to 2025.

Allen & Unwin ran a competition titled "Win a Visit to Your Primary School from Craig Silvey".

== Personal life ==
Silvey was in a relationship with writer Clare Testoni, commencing around 2013. They have a daughter born in 2022–23, and twin girls born in 2025. After he was charged with offences relating to child exploitation material, Testoni separated from him. After his sentencing, she posted a statement to Substack, claiming that she had been unaware of his offending, and that Silvey had overshadowed her career, discouraging her from continuing her PhD after the birth of their first child. She recalled being unemployed and "drowning in motherhood and in his growing absence" at the time he was arrested, and called the subsequent period "the hardest year of my life".

Silvey claimed he had been defrauded by his brother in a "criminal investment scheme" in June 2020. He lost over A$500,000 in savings, and his brother, who he had entrusted with his finances, failed to lodge several tax returns on Silvey's behalf, leaving him with "hundreds of thousands of dollars" in tax debt. He wrote Runt and Runt and the Diabolical Dognapping in part to pay off his debts.

Silvey has chronic arthritis.

He is a musician and, as of September 2025, a singer-songwriter who plays the electric ukulele in indie band The Nancy Sikes!

== Child exploitation material conviction ==
On 12 January 2026, police executed a search warrant at Silvey's home, where he was allegedly found "actively engaging with ... child exploitation offenders online". He was arrested and charged with producing, distributing, and two counts of possessing child exploitation material. The charge of production related to a period between February and June 2022, but was later dropped. He distributed the content under the alias "Jimmy Jimmy Jimmy".

His electronic devices were seized and analysed forensically, leading to a 68-year-old woman from Marangaroo being arrested and charged with producing and distributing child exploitation material, allegedly in conjunction with Silvey. The prosecutor alleged that he declined to allow investigators access to the devices.

Silvey was granted bail in the Fremantle Magistrates Court, with conditions including restricted Internet usage. On 5 May 2026, he pleaded guilty to the charges of possessing and distributing child exploitation material. The remaining charges were dropped, while his bail continued.

On 2 November 2026, Silvey was sentenced to seven months in prison, with the possibility of parole. The court heard that he had started a conversation with a "fictitious" user on an adult website, in which he expressed a sexual interest in children, and provided an explicit image of an adult with a child. More similar images and videos had been found on his devices.

Silvey published a 9,000-word essay on Substack titled "My Apology", in which he discussed his childhood, family, career, financial situation and mental health, criticised for largely ignoring victim-survivors.

== Works ==
=== Novels ===
- 2004: Rhubarb
- 2009: Jasper Jones
- 2012: The Amber Amulet
- 2020: Honeybee
- 2022: Runt
- 2025: Runt and the Diabolical Dognapping

=== Other works ===
- 2007: The World According to Warren, illustrated by Sonia Martinez (picture book)
- 2017: Jasper Jones (screenplay co-written with Shaun Grant)

== Sources ==
- Huang, Demi (6 November 2026). "Craig Silvey's Ex-partner Clare Testoni Breaks Silence on 'Great Betrayal' After Child Exploitation Crimes". 7 News. AAP.
- Silvey, Craig (2 November 2026). "My Apology". Craig Silvey.
