= Honeybee (novel) =

2020 novel by Australian author Craig Silvey

- Author: Craig Silvey
- Language: English
- Genre: Literary novel
- Publisher: Allen & Unwin
- Publication date: September 2020
- Publication place: Australia
- Media type: Print
- Pages: 424 pp.
- Awards: 2021 Indie Book Awards Book of the Year – Fiction, winner
- ISBN: 9781760877224

Honeybee is a 2020 novel by Australian author Craig Silvey.

It was the winner of the 2021 Indie Book Awards Book of the Year – Fiction.

== Synopsis ==
This coming-of-age novel follows transgender fourteen-year-old Sam Watson, assigned as male at birth, as they slowly work on becoming who they really see themselves to be. Sam's life takes a major turn when they meet Vic, at a place where both have decided to end their lives.

== Critical reception ==
Writing in Australian Book Review Anna MacDonald noted that: "By seeking to depict the inner conflict of a transgender teenager, Honeybee struggles to offer a different perspective to the representation of predominantly (but by no means only) male violence." The reviewer goes on to explain that they "found many of the characters and situations in the novel unconvincing. Silvey’s interrogation of socially imposed roles and rigidly policed identity positions relies upon the uncritical adoption of oversimplified Australian male archetypes."

In The Guardian Fiona Wright acknowledges "that Silvey has done a great deal of research in writing Honeybee and spoken to many people with lived experience of gender dysphoria and transition." However, "there's something about the way that Sam's gender identity is treated as a reveal, as something startling or surprising, that sits uncomfortably with me. It feels othering, or almost exploitative, even as Sam is always portrayed with great compassion."

== Author's legal issues and aftermath ==
On 12 January 2026, Silvey was arrested and later charged with producing, possessing and distributing child exploitation material. On 5 May 2026, he pled guilty to one charge each of possessing and distributing child exploitation material, with the production charge dropped. Honeybee publisher Allen & Unwin announced it would "review all available steps it can take to end its relationship with the author". Major Australian booksellers Dymocks, Readings and QBD removed his books from sale on their websites. Silvey was sentenced to seven months in prison on 2 November 2026.

== Notes ==
- Dedication: For Them on the Bridge

== Awards ==
- 2021 Indie Book Awards Book of the Year – Fiction, winner

== See also ==
- 2020 in Australian literature
