= Jasper Jones =

2009 novel by Craig Silvey

- Cover
- Author: Craig Silvey
- Language: English
- Publisher: Allen & Unwin
- Publication date: 2009

Jasper Jones is a 2009 novel by Australian writer Craig Silvey. It has won and been shortlisted for several major awards including being shortlisted for the International Dublin Literary Award. The novel was selected by the American Library Association as 'Best Fiction for Young Adults' in their 2012 list.

== Overview ==
A small rural Australian town grows fearful when a young girl goes missing. Thirteen year-old Charlie grows especially fearful, because he alone knows what has happened.

The academic literature describes Jasper Jones as adhering “to the conventions of Australian Gothic, which projects contemporary experience onto… dysfunctional families in small, remote towns… where young protagonists encounter violence or death, and where outsiders are punished for their difference.”

== Plot ==
The protagonist Charlie Bucktin is a quiet, book-loving, 13-year-old boy who lives in the rural town of Corrigan, Western Australia. On a summer evening in 1965, Charlie receives an unexpected visit from 14-year-old Jasper Jones, who is excluded by the Corrigan locals because of his Aboriginal heritage and rebellious lifestyle, and who is a source of distant intrigue for Charlie. Jasper asks for Charlie's help and leads him to a private clearing in the bush. There, Charlie is horrified to discover the corpse of a young girl, Laura Wishart—Jasper's only friend—beaten and suspended from a tree. Jasper examines Laura's body and notices signs that she was raped, though Charlie does not recognise what Jasper has discovered. Aware that he is likely to be blamed for Laura's murder, Jasper convinces Charlie that they should hide the body to buy time to solve the crime themselves. They place her body in the nearby dam, weighing it down with a rock.

A search for the missing girl is soon organised. The authorities assume she is a run-away. Jasper is interrogated brutally by the local police but released quickly. During this time, tensions rise in the town, while parents fear more disappearances and the townspeople seek someone to blame.

Charlie spends his days with his best friend Jeffrey Lu, a Vietnamese boy who shares Charlie's love for intellectual jokes and deals stoically with the constant racial hatred inflicted on him and his family. Jeffrey is a cricket enthusiast, but his attempts to join Corrigan's team are thwarted by the racism of the coach and other players. Eventually, fortune goes his way, and Jeffrey finds himself batting in a game against a rival town, watched by Charlie and Eliza, Laura Wishart's younger sister. As Jeffrey wins the game on the last ball, Charlie and Eliza's relationship moves from friendship to romance.

Meanwhile, Jasper thinks that Laura's murderer is Mad Jack Lionel, a reclusive old man who is rumoured to have done terrible things in the past. Jasper decides to confront Lionel and, with Charlie, goes to his house. Lionel manages to defuse Jasper's aggression, and the truth is revealed: Lionel is, in fact, Jasper's grandfather. When Jasper was a baby, Lionel crashed his car while driving Jasper's mother to the hospital, causing her death. The incident left Lionel broken and ostracised by the townspeople.

After the confrontation with Lionel, late at night, Eliza comes to Charlie's window. Eliza wants Charlie to follow her. On their midnight ramble, they come across a lone car parked near the river. Charlie recognises his mother in the backseat in a compromising situation with the town's policeman, Jasper's determined bully. Eliza pulls Charlie away and takes him, unexpectedly, to the spot where Laura died. Here, Eliza tells Charlie what she knows about Laura's death. After a violent sexual assault at the hands of her abusive father, Laura came looking for Jasper. Eliza followed her to the clearing. Unable to find Jasper, and so believing he left town without her, Laura committed suicide by hanging herself from a tree. Although watching her sister from a nearby hidden spot, Eliza could not reach Laura in time. After hearing Eliza's shocking story, Charlie then confessed that he and Jasper put Laura's body into the dam, and have been trying to prove Jasper's innocence. Jasper discovers Charlie and Eliza, and Charlie repeats Eliza's tale, and the three spend the night under the stars, overcoming their grief.

The next day, Eliza, Jasper and Charlie split up. Charlie knows he is never going to see Jasper again. Jasper is leaving Corrigan for good. When he arrives home, Charlie finds his mother packing and leaving home. His parents are separating.

Charlie and his father are now on their own. Charlie's father finishes the novel he's been working on. Charlie is the first to read it, and he finds it brilliant.

As the novel nears its end, Charlie performs a "feat of bravery" that impresses his school peers. He sneaks onto the property of Mad Jack Lionel and steals peaches. To impress his peers even more, Charlie stages a "brawl" with Lionel (having promised Lionel to cook his Sunday dinner if he would pretend to attack Charlie). The pretend brawl is successful and excites the students who believe it is very much real. Even Warwick Trent, the bully of Charlie and Jeffrey, believes that Charlie has shown a lot of courage. While the children cheer on Charlie, suddenly, someone sees a plume of smoke in the distance.

Charlie runs toward the smoke and finds that Eliza's house is on fire. He sees her standing by herself and realises that she caused the blaze, and is saddened by the reality that the people of Corrigan will blame Jasper for it. Charlie goes to Eliza, who continues to watch the fire calmly, and whispers "perfect words" in her ear.

== Characters ==
Charlie Bucktin: The thirteen year-old protagonist and narrator of the novel. He is intellectual rather than athletic. This makes him somewhat of an outsider in Corrigan, where sporting ability is highly valued and intelligence not so much. He aspires to become a writer, and reads notable books during the course of the novel, including Pudd'nhead Wilson and To Kill a Mockingbird. These books are the source of much of Charlie's inspiration and guidance.

Jasper Jones: Mixed Aboriginal and white, Jasper is an outcast. He is fourteen but Charlie states that Jasper looks much older. He is the town's scapegoat, the first person to be blamed for any kind of trouble. Jasper's alcoholic father is physically abusive, prompting Jasper to steal for food, as there is no money left in the house. Jasper's mother died when he was young, and Jasper tells Charlie he doesn't remember anything about her.

Eliza Wishart: Charlie's romantic interest. Eliza is described as intelligent and slightly resembling Audrey Hepburn. She is Laura's younger sister.

Laura Wishart: Eliza's older sister and Jasper's love interest. It is her death being investigated.

Jeffrey Lu: Charlie's best friend. He is a year younger than Charlie but has skipped a year in school because of his intellect. Because of his Vietnamese heritage, Jeffrey often experiences racial discrimination from the other cricketers despite his exceptional cricket abilities. Often makes sassy comments about Charlie's crush on Eliza.

Mad Jack Lionel: An elderly recluse scapegoated by the township. Kids regularly steal from his property to prove their bravery. Taking a peach from his tree is the highest achievement. Jasper blames him for Laura's murder.

Warwick Trent: The generic bully character. He bullies Jeffrey on the cricket team and he bullies Charlie at school. He has been put back two years into Charlie's grade.

== Publication history ==
The novel was published in 2009 in Australia by Allen & Unwin, and in the UK by Windmill Books,

It was published in the US by Alfred A. Knopf Books for Young Readers, an imprint of Penguin Random House, in 2011.

In translation, it has been published by Seix Barral/Grupo Planeta in Spain, Neri Pozza/Giano Editore in Italy, Calmann-Lévy/Hachette in France and Rowohlt in Germany (2012).

== Author's legal issues and aftermath ==
On 12 January 2026, Silvey was arrested and later charged with possessing, distributing and producing child exploitation material. On 5 May 2026 he pleaded guilty to possessing and distributing child exploitation material, with the production charge dropped. Jasper Jones publisher Allen & Unwin announced it would "review all available steps it can take to end its relationship with the author". Major Australian booksellers Dymocks, Readings and QBD removed his books from sale on their websites. All Australian state-education departments demanded or recommended that state schools remove his books from lessons whilst legal proceedings were underway. On 2 November 2026, Silvey was sentenced to seven months in prison.

== Awards and nominations ==
=== Won ===
- The University of Canberra selected the novel as its inaugural UC Book of the Year for 2013.
- Indie Book of the Year Award, 2009: Overall Winner and Fiction Winner
- Western Australian Premier's Book Awards, 2009: Winner (joint) for Fiction
- Australian Book Industry Awards (ABIA), 2010: Book of the Year, and Literary Fiction of the Year

=== Shortlisted ===
- Miles Franklin Award, 2010: shortlisted
- The Sydney Morning Herald Best Young Australian Novelists, 2010: shortlisted
- New South Wales Premier's Literary Award (Christina Stead Prize for fiction), 2010: shortlisted
- Victorian Premier's Literary Awards (Vance Palmer Prize for Fiction), 2010: shortlisted
- International Dublin Literary Award, 2011: shortlisted
- Michael L. Printz Award, 2012: shortlisted

=== Book lists ===
Jasper Jones was selected by the American Library Association as 'Best Fiction for Young Adults' in their 2012 list.

== Film adaptation ==
The film rights for the novel were sold to producers Vincent Sheehan and David Jowsey. Screenwriter Shaun Grant and Silvey co-wrote the script. Director Rachel Perkins started filming in October 2015. The film stars Toni Collette (as Ruth Bucktin), Levi Miller (Charlie Bucktin), Aaron L. McGrath (Jasper Jones), Hugo Weaving (Mad Jack Lionel), Angourie Rice (Eliza Wishart), and Dan Wyllie (Wes Bucktin).

== Stage adaptation ==
The novel has been adapted as a play by Kate Mulvany. In 2014, Barking Gecko Theatre Company premiered the stage adaptation of Jasper Jones in Perth. In early 2016, Belvoir St Theatre performed the play in Sydney. In mid 2016, Melbourne Theatre Company performed the play in Melbourne. The production was also performed in Brisbane from July - August 2018 by Queensland Theatre - http://www.queenslandtheatre.com.au/Shows/18-Jasper-Jones#, and in Adelaide from August–September 2019 by the State Theatre Company - see https://statetheatrecompany.com.au/shows/jasper-jones/.
