= Clarence Ryan =

Australian actor (active 2006– )

- Born: Perth, Western Australia
- Other name: Clarence John Ryan
- Education: Warwick Senior High School
- Occupation: Actor
- Years active: 2006–present
- Notable work: September (2007); Lockie Leonard (2007); Wrong Kind of Black (2018); Territory (2024)
- Family: Trevor Jamieson (uncle)

Clarence Ryan is an Aboriginal Australian actor.

== Early life and education ==
Ryan is from Perth and started acting when he was 10 or 11. He attended Perth's Warwick Senior High School, but when he began performing on Australian screens at the age of 14, he put his school studies on hold for six months, so he could focus on his acting career.

== Career ==
Ryan was a co-lead in 2007 drama film September opposite Xavier Samuel, which saw him nominated for the 2008 AACTA Award for Best Young Actor for his performance. 2007 also saw him take on the lead role of Geoffrey 'Egg' Eggleston in children's series Lockie Leonard, based on Tim Winton's novels of the same name. He later had a recurring role in 2010 children's supernatural series Dead Gorgeous, playing the part of Tom Kelly.

In 2012, Ryan starred in the historical documentary Yagan, about the Noongar warrior Yagan. In 2014, he performed on stage in King Hit, about the life of Geoffrey Narkle, an Aboriginal man and member of the Stolen Generations, and his boxing career, reflecting on culture, identity, and finding strength. He also played the role of Private Billy Tinker in 2014 miniseries ANZAC Girls, opposite Anna McGahan and Caroline Craig.

Ryan next appeared in the 2017 second season of Cleverman, before playing the lead role in Emmy Award-winning comedy-drama Wrong Kind of Black, which was released in 2018 as a web series and telemovie. It was created, written, and narrated by Aboriginal author and storyteller, Boori Monty Pryor, upon whose life it is based.

In 2019, Ryan starred as Jack in KGB, an Australian comedy series following two rookie detectives through Perth. Also that year, he featured as Sully in the miniseries Stateless, with Yvonne Strahovski, Cate Blanchett and Jai Courtney, which told the story of four strangers in an immigration detention centre. During this period, he also created two comedy web series – Our Law and Old Mate – the latter, about a 47,000-year-old Indigenous Australian superhero, which he also starred in. The following year, he was named as one of the Casting Guild of Australia's Rising Stars for 2021.

In 2022, Ryan appeared in the first season of Mystery Road: Origin. His performance earned him a nomination for the 2023 Logie Award for Most Outstanding Supporting Actor. That same year, he featured in a segment of the Australian-New Zealand anthology film We Are Still Here, made to coincide with the 250th anniversary of James Cook’s second voyage to Australia, and reflecting on its legacy of colonialism and racism. Ryan played the role of Ken, a painter who was harassed by a police officer while trying to purchase alcohol.

Ryan next appeared alongside Radha Mitchell, Mia Wasikowska and Eric Bana in 2023 family drama film Blueback, which was based on Tim Winton's 1997 novella.

Ryan played the mechanic Black Thumb in 2024 dystopian action film Furiosa: A Mad Max Saga, the most recent installment of the Mad Max franchise starring Anya Taylor-Joy and Chris Hemsworth. That same year, he appeared in Indigenous horror film The Moogai and played opposite Greta Scacchi as Daniel in 2024 drama film He Ain't Heavy. He also played Nolan Brannock, an ambitious Indigenous cattle station owner, in Netflix drama miniseries Territory, opposite Anna Torv, Michael Dorman and Robert Taylor. On 23 November 2024, the ABC announced that the second season of Mystery Road: Origin was in production and that Ryan would reprise his role as Sputty.

More recently, Ryan took on the role of Roddy in 2025 drama miniseries Reckless with Tasma Walton and Jessica De Gouw and played Cowboy in Top End Bub, the series follow-up to 2019 film Top End Wedding, starring Miranda Tapsell. Within the same year, he featured in family comedy film Kangaroo, playing the part of Nick.

== Personal life ==
Ryan is the nephew of actor Trevor Jamieson, which they discovered while filming Lockie Leonard in 2007.

== Credits ==
=== Film ===
Year	Title	Role	Notes	Ref
2006	Lapislazuli – Im Auge des Bären	Bataa		
2007	September	Paddy		
2009	Bourke Boy	Russell	Short film	
2012	Yagan	Yagan	Documentary film	
2014	Wongi Warrior	Jim	Short film	
2014	Rat Tale	Rick	Short film	
2014	One Fine Day	Man	Short film	
2015	The Tender Dark	Joey	Short film	
2016	We Were Here	Stranger	Short film	
2016	Leroy's Dream	Leroy	Short film	
2016	Ghost	Yawang	Short film	
2017	Dirt Tin	Sam	Short film	
2017	Blight	Criminal	Short film	
2017	OtherLife	Byron Finbar		
2017	Nobody's Child	Boxer	Short film	
2018	The Decadent and Depraved	Coen		
2019	Between Two Lines	Burt	Short film	
2019	Jadai – The Broome Brawler	Jadai	Short film	
2019	Dark Place	Blackfella	Anthology film (segment: "Killer Native")	
2020	Moon Rock for Monday	Johnny		
2021	Good Night	Man	Short film	
2022	We Are Still Here	Ken	Anthology film	
2022	Blueback	Briggs		
2022	The Fritz		Short film	
2024	The Moogai	Ray Boy		
2024	Furiosa: A Mad Max Saga	Black Thumb		
2024	He Ain't Heavy	Daniel		
2025	Kangaroo	Nick		
TBA	Twice Over	Adrian Tolman	Post-production	
TBA	Deeply	Levi	In development	

=== Television ===
Year	Title	Role	Notes	Ref
2007–2010	Lockie Leonard	Geoffrey 'Egg' Eggleston	52 episodes	
2009	Stormworld	Llargh	Episode: "Three Sun Day"	
2010	Dead Gorgeous	Tom Kelly	4 episodes	
2013	Serangoon Road	Young Robbo	Episode #1.9	
2014	ANZAC Girls	Private Billy Tinker	Miniseries, 3 episodes	
2015	The Secret River	Greybeard's Warrior #1	Miniseries, 2 episodes	
2017	Cleverman	Jarli	Season 2, 6 episodes	
2017	Wolf Creek	Patrick	Miniseries, episode: "Singing"	
2018	Wrong Kind of Black	Monty Pryor	Miniseries; 4 episodes	
2018	Wanted	Hamish	5 episodes	
2019	KGB	Jack	5 episodes	
2019	Single Ladies	Mike the Bartender	Episode: "Community Standards"	
2020	Stateless	Sully	Miniseries, 6 episodes	
2022; 2025	Mystery Road: Origin	Sputty	6 episodes	
2024	Territory	Nolan Brannock	Miniseries; 6 episodes	
2025	The Newsreader	Deano Prince	Season 3, 1 episode	
2025	Reckless	Roddy	Miniseries, 4 episodes	
2025	Top End Bub	Cowboy	Miniseries, 4 episodes	
TBA	Old Mate	47,000-year-old Indigenous Australian superhero	Web series In development (Also creator)	

=== Stage ===
Year	Title	Role	Production co	Ref
2015	King Hit	Geoffrey Narkle	Yirra Yaakin Theatre Company	

== Awards and nominations ==
Year	Work	Award	Category	Result	Ref
2008	September	AFI Award	Best Young Actor	Nominated	
2015	King Hit	Performing Arts WA Awards	Best Newcomer	Won	
2015	King Hit	Performing Arts WA Awards	Best Actor	Nominated	
2016	We Were Here	West Australian Screen Awards	Best Performance by an Actor	Nominated	
2018	Wrong Kind of Black	NZWebFest	International Narrative Award for Best Actor	Won	
2018	Cleverman	Equity Ensemble Awards	Outstanding Performance by an Ensemble in a Drama Series	Won	
2023	Mystery Road: Origin	Logie Awards	Silver Logie for Most Outstanding Supporting Actor	Nominated	
2023	Mystery Road: Origin	Equity Ensemble Awards	Outstanding Performance by an Ensemble in a Drama Series	Won	
2026	Mystery Road: Origin	Logie Awards	Silver Logie for Best Supporting Actor	Nominated; Result pending	
