= Jasper Jones (film) =

2017 Australian film

- Theatrical film poster
- Directed by: Rachel Perkins
- Written by: Shaun Grant; Craig Silvey
- Based on: Jasper Jones by Craig Silvey
- Produced by: Vincent Sheehan; David Jowsey
- Starring: Levi Miller; Angourie Rice; Aaron L. McGrath; Toni Collette; Hugo Weaving
- Cinematography: Mark Wareham
- Edited by: Veronika Jenet
- Music by: Antony Partos
- Distributed by: Madman Entertainment
- Release date: 2 March 2017
- Running time: 105 minutes
- Country: Australia
- Language: English
- Budget: A$5.5 million

Jasper Jones is an Australian mystery drama film directed by Rachel Perkins. The film was released in 2017 and is based on the 2009 novel of the same name by Craig Silvey.

== Plot ==
In 1969, Charlie Bucktin is a 14-year-old boy living in the fictitious rural town of Corrigan, based on the real rural town Corrigin in Western Australia. Charlie spends his days with his best friend Jeffrey Lu, a Vietnamese boy who shares Charlie's love of intellectual banter, and deals stoically with the constant race-hate inflicted on him and his family. Eliza Wishart, daughter of the town mayor, becomes increasingly endeared towards Charlie.

On Christmas evening Charlie is unexpectedly visited by Jasper Jones, an outcast in Corrigan due to his Aboriginal heritage and rebellious lifestyle. Jasper begs for Charlie's help, and leads him to his private glade in the bush. Here Charlie is horrified to find the dead body of a young girl, Jasper's girlfriend Laura Wishart, battered and hanging from a tree. Jasper, aware that he is likely to be blamed for Laura's murder, convinces Charlie that they should hide the body, so they throw it into a nearby pond, weighted by a large rock.

Jeffrey is passionate about cricket, but his attempts to join the Corrigan team are thwarted by the racism of the coach and other players. Eventually fortune goes his way, and he finds himself batting in a game against a rival town, watched by Charlie, who has befriended Eliza, Laura Wishart's younger sister. As Jeffrey wins the game on the last ball, Charlie and Eliza hold hands and embrace.

A search for the missing girl is soon organised, focused on the idea that she may have run away. Jasper is interrogated roughly by the local police, but he soon escapes. Meanwhile, tension builds in the town, as parents fear more disappearances, and townspeople search for someone to blame. The tension is funnelled into strict curfews for the children as well as racial attacks on Jeffrey's family. It is revealed that Charlie's mother, increasingly disillusioned with life in Corrigan and her marriage, is having an affair with the police sergeant involved with the investigation into Laura's disappearance.

Jasper believes that Laura's murderer is Mad Jack Lionel, a reclusive old man who is rumoured to have done terrible things in the past. Jasper decides to confront Lionel on New Year's Eve, and together with Charlie, goes to his house. Lionel manages to defuse Jasper's aggression, and the truth comes out: Lionel is actually Jasper's grandfather, who had ostracised his son's family for marrying an aboriginal woman when Jasper was a baby. His daughter-in-law then took care of him, spurring a change of heart towards her. One night, she needed medical attention, and Lionel had attempted to race her to hospital. In his haste, however, he accidentally crashed his car, causing her death. The incident has left him guilty, broken, and ostracised by the townspeople. Ever since, Lionel has been trying to reach out to Jasper and apologise for his actions.

On the same night, Charlie comes to Eliza's window. They go to Jasper's glade. Here Eliza tells Charlie that she knows everything about Laura's death and hands him the suicide note detailing the gruesome reasons for her apparent suicide. The note said that Laura’s sexually abusive father had gotten her pregnant, and after a particularly violent fight on Christmas day, she came looking for Jasper. Eliza followed her to the glade. Finding Jasper away, Laura hanged herself in despair, and Eliza, paralysed by fear, could not save her. Charlie then confesses that he and Jasper had thrown Laura's body into the pond. The next day Charlie and Eliza take the note to Eliza's mother. She quietly reads the note then tears it repeatedly, eventually soaking the tiny scraps in her cup of tea without saying a word. The look on her face makes clear that she knew about the abuse and even now has no intention of addressing it. Eliza harshly insists that Charlie leave the house. He passes her father in the yard and then makes his way to the police station to report what he knows. His attempt is interrupted by news that the Wishart house is on fire and everyone runs to the scene.

Charlie's mother leaves Corrigan. Charlie remains close to Eliza, who exacts revenge on her father by setting fire to their house, injuring him. The secret about Laura's death remains with the three of them.

== Cast ==
- Levi Miller as Charlie Bucktin
- Angourie Rice as Eliza Wishart
- Aaron L. McGrath as Jasper Jones
- Toni Collette as Ruth Bucktin
- Hugo Weaving as Mad Jack Lionel
- Kevin Long as Jeffrey Lu
- Dan Wyllie as Wes Bucktin
- Matt Nable as Sarge
- Susan Prior as Gwyn Wishart

== Production ==
Jasper Jones is based on the 2009 novel of the same name by Craig Silvey.

It was written by Shaun Grant and Craig Silvey, and directed by Rachel Perkins. The film was produced by Vincent Sheehan and David Jowsey.

== Reception ==
On the review aggregator website Rotten Tomatoes, 78% of 23 critics' reviews are positive.

C. J. Johnson of ABC Radio gave a positive review, calling the film "engrossing, surprising and moving, and obviously made with great care and love." For Herald Sun (Australia), Leigh Paatsch rated it 2,5/5 writing that "uneven plotting and unnecessary tweaks to what made the book so great holds the movie back from becoming anything more than occasionally good."

For The Guardian, James Robert Douglas wrote: "Perkins, finding the sweet spot between childish goofiness and adult drama, keeps things fleet, funny, and just the right side of suspenseful."

== Accolades ==
Award	Category	Subject	Result
AACTA Awards (7th)	Best Film	David Jowsey	Nominated
AACTA Awards (7th)	Best Film	Vincent Sheehan	Nominated
AACTA Awards (7th)	Best Adapted Screenplay	Shaun Grant	Nominated
AACTA Awards (7th)	Best Adapted Screenplay	Craig Silvey	Nominated
AACTA Awards (7th)	Best Supporting Actor	Hugo Weaving	Nominated
AACTA Awards (7th)	Best Sound	Yulia Akerholt	Nominated
AACTA Awards (7th)	Best Sound	James Andrews	Nominated
AACTA Awards (7th)	Best Sound	Liam Egan	Nominated
AACTA Awards (7th)	Best Sound	Les Fiddess	Nominated
AACTA Awards (7th)	Best Sound	Trevor Hope	Nominated
AACTA Awards (7th)	Best Sound	Robert Sullivan	Nominated
AACTA Awards (7th)	Best Production Design	Herbert Pinter	Nominated
AACTA Awards (7th)	Best Costume Design	Margot Wilson	Nominated
Antipodean Film Festival	Jury Grand Prix, Best Feature film	Rachel Perkins	Won
AWGIE Award	Best Writing in a Feature Film - Adapted	Shaun Grant	Won
Golden Trailer Award	Best Foreign TV Spot		Nominated
