= Bloodaxe (TV series) =

Upcoming historical drama television series

- Genre: Historical drama
- Created by: Michael Hirst; Horatio Hirst
- Starring: Xavier Molyneux; Jessica Madsen; Levi Miller; Karlis Arnolds Avots; Rod Hallett; Alina Tomnikov; Sisse Marie; Rune Temte
- Countries of origin: Ireland; United States
- Original language: English

Production
- Executive producers: Michael Hirst; Horatio Hirst; Morgan O'Sullivan; Steve Stark; Arturo Interian; John Weber; Sheila Hockin; Fred Toye
- Production companies: Amazon MGM Studios; O'Sullivan Productions; Toluca Pictures

Original release
- Network: Amazon Prime Video

Bloodaxe is an upcoming historical drama television series created by Michael Hirst and his son Horatio Hirst for Amazon Prime Video. Set in the 10th century, the series follows the Viking warrior Erik Bloodaxe and his wife, Gunnhild, as Erik rises to the throne of Norway.

The series is set to premiere on 20 January 2027. In June 2026, ahead of the series premiere, it was renewed for a second season.

== Cast and characters ==
=== Main ===
- Xavier Molyneux as Erik Bloodaxe, a Viking warrior whose rise to power defines the central conflict of the series
- Jessica Madsen as Gunnhild, Erik's wife, known as the "Mother of Kings"
- Levi Miller as Haakon, Erik's younger half-brother
- Karlis Arnolds Avots as Egil, a poet seeking to avenge his family
- Rod Hallett as Athelstan, King of Wessex
- Alina Tomnikov as Greta, a shield-maiden who can secretly transform into the Seer, a mystical figure with divine visions of the future
- Sisse Marie as Thyra, Queen of Denmark
- Rune Temte as Gorm, King of Denmark

=== Supporting ===
- Jesper Christensen as Harald Fairhair, King of Norway, Erik's father and the ageing first king of all Norway
- Marc Rissmann as Greycloak, Erik's eldest brother
- Kai Luke Brümmer as Strut-Harald, one of Gunnhild's brothers
- Arthur McBain as Sigrod, one of Erik's brothers
- Mads Reuther as Jarl Sigurd, the Jarl of Hladir and an ally of Haakon
- Saku Taittonen as Knut, one of Gunnhild's brothers
- Ross O'Hennessy as Rolf Ragnavaldsson
- Fintan Kinsella

== Episodes ==
No.	Title	Directed by	Written by	Original release date
1	TBA	TBA	Michael Hirst & Horatio Hirst	20 January 2027
2	TBA	TBA	Michael Hirst & Horatio Hirst	20 January 2027
3	TBA	TBA	Michael Hirst & Horatio Hirst	20 January 2027
4	TBA	TBA	Michael Hirst & Horatio Hirst	20 January 2027
5	TBA	TBA	Michael Hirst & Horatio Hirst	20 January 2027
6	TBA	TBA	Michael Hirst & Horatio Hirst	20 January 2027
7	TBA	TBA	Michael Hirst & Horatio Hirst	20 January 2027
8	TBA	TBA	Michael Hirst & Horatio Hirst	20 January 2027

== Production ==
=== Development ===
In March 2025, it was reported that Michael Hirst and his son Horatio Hirst were developing a historical drama series for Amazon Prime Video centered around the Viking warrior Erik Bloodaxe and titled Bloodaxe, which was subsequently ordered to series. The series is Michael Hirst's third set during the Viking Age, following his role as creator and lead writer of the History Channel series Vikings and his role as executive producer on the Netflix series Vikings: Valhalla. Horatio Hirst previously portrayed the character Bishop Grimketel in four episodes of Vikings: Valhalla, and will make his writing debut with Bloodaxe. Historically, Erik Bloodaxe's father was Harald Fairhair, a character portrayed by Peter Franzén in several seasons of Vikings.

In June 2026, Amazon renewed the series for a second season.

=== Casting ===
In June 2025, Xavier Molyneux and Jessica Madsen were cast in the lead roles of Erik Bloodaxe and Gunnhild respectively. Later that month, Levi Miller joined the main cast as Haakon. In July, Karlis Arnolds Avots, Rod Hallett, Alina Tomnikov, Sisse Marie, and Rune Temte joined the main cast, with Jesper Christensen joining in a supporting role. In October, Marc Rissmann and Kai Luke Brümmer joined the cast while Arthur McBain joined in November. In January 2026, Mads Reuther and Saku Taittonen joined the cast.

In August 2026, Gard Løkke joined the main cast for the second season while Melina Åkerman, Kieran Bew, Sebastian Bull, and George Burgess joined in supporting roles. In October, Maddy Ambus, Steven Brand, and Lasse Steen joined the cast.

=== Filming ===
Principal photography for the first season commenced in June 2025 in Wicklow, Ireland. Frederick E.O. Toye was set to direct the opening episodes.

The second season began filming in July 2026.

== Release ==
All eight episodes of the first season are set to premiere on 20 January 2027 on Amazon Prime Video.
