= September (2007 film) =

- Directed by: Peter Carstairs
- Written by: Ant Horn; Peter Carstairs
- Produced by: John Polson
- Starring: Xavier Samuel; Clarence John Ryan; Keiran Darcy-Smith; Kelton Pell; Alice McConnell; Lisa Flanagan; Mia Wasikowska
- Cinematography: Jules O'Loughlin
- Edited by: Martin Connor
- Music by: Roger Mason
- Distributed by: Hopscotch Films
- Release date: 29 November 2007
- Running time: 85 minutes
- Country: Australia
- Language: English
- Budget: A$2.4m

September is a 2007 Australian drama film, directed by Peter Carstairs and produced by John Polson. Set in Western Australia's wheatbelt in 1968 (though filmed at Harden, New South Wales), it stars Xavier Samuel and Clarence John Ryan as two teenagers whose interracial friendship struggles to withstand the expectations of their community. The film sensitively documents the disparity and discrimination faced by the country's Aboriginal people.

== Plot ==
Rick and Eve Anderson are traditional wheat-and-wool farmers in Western Australia's drought-prone wheatbelt. Their 15-year-old son Ed enjoys a close friendship with Paddy, the son of Aboriginal labourer Michael Parker whose family lives in a shack on the farm and receives sustenance provisions in return for their labour. Ed attends school in a nearby township.

Paddy receives no schooling but Ed has taught him to read, and he aspires to more in life than his family's virtual slavery. One weekend, on a shopping trip to town, the boys go to the cinema, where the colour bar obliges them to sit in separate rows. They see a newsreel about the Aboriginal boxer Lionel Rose who has won a world championship and is a national hero. The boys build an outdoor boxing ring in a field. As they engage in friendly sparring, Paddy forms the ambition of escaping slavery by joining Jimmy Sharman's fairground boxing troupe. Their relationship is also tested by Ed's adolescent attraction to a girl, Amelia, whose family has moved to the property next door.

In the previous year (1967), a federal referendum had overwhelmingly determined removal of official discrimination against Aborigines, and given the federal parliament power to make special laws with regard to them. There was simultaneous agitation for other rights, including equal pay for farm workers. However, when Paddy's father enquired whether he could be given wages, his boss Rick Anderson replied that he lacked funds. The Aboriginal family could either continue unpaid or vacate their home on the farm. Michael Parker, whose wife was caring for a new baby, saw no option than to go on working without pay.

The film concludes with Paddy's departure to seek his fortune in boxing, and a reconciliation as Ed apologises for former disloyalty to his friend.

== Cast ==
- Xavier Samuel as Ed Anderson
- Clarence John Ryan as Paddy Parker
- Kieran Darcy-Smith as Rick Anderson
- Kelton Pell as Michael Parker
- Alice McConnell as Eve Anderson
- Lisa Flanagan as Leena Parker
- Mia Wasikowska as Amelia Hamilton
- Sibylla Budd as Miss Gregory
- Anton Tennet as Tom
- Paul Gleeson as John Hamilton
- Tara Morice as Jennifer Hamilton
- Morgan Griffin as Heidi
- Bob Baines as Henry
- Tom E. Lewis as Uncle Harold
- Brady Kitchingham as Tom's mate
- Lillian Crombie as Gran Parker
- Harry Stewart as Wee Poor Boy
- Bridie-Ann Perry as Towns person

== Production ==
September was created as part of the Tropfest Feature Program and was shot over 25 days. Filming largely took place in rural NSW.

== Reception ==
Rotten Tomatoes lists 2 critics with both assessed as fresh.

Stuart Diwell of The Sunday Tasmanian gives it very bad review concluding "Director Peter Carstairs and his co-writer Ant Horn clearly think they have profound things to say about issues as varied as adolescence and race in Australia. Well, they don't. Instead what they deliver is a nicely photographed snail's pace bore."

The Australian's Evan Williams gave it 3 1/2 stars, stating "September is a delicate, touching and deceptively modest film about friendship and racial tensions in a remote West Australian community in the 1960s. " The Sun Herald's Rob Lowing gave it 7/10 saying "it is a delicate movie to be savoured, and admired for its rewarding last-minute plot moves." Writing in Variety Russell Edwards gave it a positive capsual review, stating the "script skillfully draws together its disparate elements and is powerful enough to transcend the film’s considerable limitations."

== Accolades ==
Carstairs was the inaugural winner of the Tropfest Feature Program in 2006 for his screenplay for September. The prize included a A$1 million grant funded by The Movie Network, which went toward the film's total budget of $2.4 million.

September premiered at the 2007 Melbourne International Film Festival, and went on to screen at the Toronto and Berlin International Film Festivals of the same year.

In 2008, the film was nominated for the ASSG Feature Film Soundtrack of the Year award. It also won for Jules O'Loughlin the IF Award for Best Cinematography, as well as a nomination for Sam Hobbs (Best Production Design).
