= Xavier Molyneux =

Australian actor

- Born: Australia
- Occupation: Actor
- Years active: 2020–present
- Height: 6 ft 2 in (188 cm)

Xavier Molyneux is an Australian actor and reality television star. He began his career securing roles in short films and in 2020, he was a contestant on the Australian reality television series Big Brother. In 2023, Molyneux secured the role of Young Micheal in the film Take My Hand. That year, he was cast in the regular role of Byron Stone in the soap opera Neighbours. He also appeared in other guest parts and worked as an event paramedic in-between roles.

== Career ==
Molyneux had a job as an event paramedic in Sydney. Molyneux is also a surfer. Molyneux's first short film role was playing Jack Barnes in Aussie of the Year, which explores the life of a college graduate struggling to forge a career. Molyneux finished filming for the project in early 2020. That year, Molyneux appeared in the twelfth series of the Australian reality television series series, Big Brother. During his time in the show, the COVID-19 pandemic developed further and affected the show's production. The production was paused temporarily until a crew member tested negative for COVID. Molyneux and other housemates were allowed to speak with family, which was unusual because the show's premise forbids contestants to have outside contact. On 5 July 2020, Molyneux became the twelfth housemate to become evicted from the series. The series was pre-recorded and Molyneux revealed that, upon his departure from the house, he lost his job. Molyneux worked as an events paramedic and due to all events being cancelled during the pandemic, there was no work available. He spent this time processing his experiences during Big Brother and refurbished an RV. Molyneux also did not receive as much airtime as other contestants, which he addressed on social media. Molyneux did not disclose his acting career to producers and only billed himself as a paramedic. This led to online theories that producers limited his screen-time because of his profession.

In 2021, Molyneux appeared in the film Love You Like That. Molyneux continued to work as an event paramedic until December 2022 while he tried to secure more acting roles. He later appeared in a short film titled Girl, playing the role of Ashton. In 2023, Molyneux secured a role in the film Take My Hand, which finished filming in the first half of that year. The film was released in 2024 and focuses on the true story of the film's writer and director John Raftopoulos, directly chronicling his marriage to Claire Jensz. Molyneux appeared alongside Meg Fraser and they play younger versions of the film's two main characters. When Molyneux began filming it was one of his first roles. He later recalled his feelings, explaining, "I've only really been an actor since the start of this film. So a lot of impostor syndrome and, you know, very nervous, but excited."

In 2022, Molyneux auditioned for the role of Byron Stone in the soap opera Neighbours. He was unsuccessful and Joe Klocek took on the role. In 2023, Molyneux was travelling in Canada when his agent informed him that the role was being recast and he could have an audition with casting director, Thea McLeod. He travelled back to Australia and was this time successful. In May 2023, Molyneux was seen working on the set of Neighbours. In July, it was confirmed that he had joined the show's regular cast, playing Byron. A Neighbours publicist wrote about the production's excitement about Molyneux's casting. They added "Byron will be thrust into the heart of the Ramsay Street drama when Neighbours returns this September." Molyneux later revealed that he cried upon receiving the role because he "loved" the show. In the show, Bryon is the son of long-term character Jane Harris, played by Annie Jones, with whom Molyneux filmed his first scenes with, who he called "fantastic" and supported him on-set In 2024, Molyneux discussed that writers planned to give his character more "raunchy" storylines. He added he was "excited" for Byron's new story to be broadcast, adding "there was a lot of effort put in behind it." That same year, Molyneux appeared in the series drama series Last Days of the Space Age. He decided to leave Neighbours and his final scenes as Byron were broadcast in August 2025, when the character leaves to go travelling. Molyneux filmed a brief return appearance as Byron for the show's final episode that year. In June 2025, it was announced that Molyneux will play the titular role of Erik Bloodaxe in Amazon MGM's Viking drama series, Bloodaxe.

== Filmography ==
Year	Title	Role	Notes
2021	Love You Like That	Shane	Film role
2022	Girl	Ashton Morrison	Short film
2023–2025	Neighbours	Byron Stone	Regular role
2024	Take My Hand	Young Michael	Film role
2024	Last Days of the Space Age	Surfer Dude 2	Guest role
TBA	Aussie of the Year	Jack Barnes	Short film
TBA	Bloodaxe	Erik Bloodaxe	Main role
