= Wild Things (2027 TV series) =

Upcoming American television series

- Genre: Biographical drama
- Created by: John Robert Hoffman
- Based on: Wild Things: Siegfried & Roy by Steven Leckart
- Starring: Jude Law; Andrew Garfield; Justin Theroux
- Country of origin: United States
- Original language: English

Production
- Executive producers: Brian Grazer; Matt Shakman; John Hoffman; Jude Law; Andrew Garfield; Kristen Zolner; Natalie Berkus; Tony Leondis; Kathy Ciric; Will Malnati; Steven Leckart
- Production companies: Imagine Television; Apple Studios

Original release
- Network: Apple TV

Wild Things is an upcoming biographical drama miniseries based on the podcast Wild Things: Siegfried & Roy created by Steven Leckart. The series is scheduled to premiere on April 16, 2027.

== Premise ==
A chronicling of the popularity of the duo Siegfried & Roy, who performed with tigers in Las Vegas for over 30 years before tragedy put an end to their careers.

== Cast ==
=== Main ===
- Jude Law as Siegfried Fischbacher
- Andrew Garfield as Roy Horn
- Justin Theroux as Steve Wynn

=== Recurring ===
- Darius Fraser as Toney Mitchell
- Brett Gelman as Bernie Yuman
- Jessica Madsen as Lynette Chappell
- Justin Bartha as Ken Feld
- Cameron Britton as David Neal
- Bill Heck as Jimmy Lavery
- Jason Butler Harner
- Wanda Opalinska

== Production ==
Development for the series at Apple TV was first announced in October 2022, with John Robert Hoffman set to write and executive produce the series. Further development was announced in May 2025, with Jude Law and Andrew Garfield cast to play Siegfried and Roy respectively. Matt Shakman was hired to direct the pilot, with filming for the series set to begin in the fall of 2025. In September, Justin Theroux was cast to play Steve Wynn, while Darius Fraser joined the cast in the recurring role of Toney Mitchell. In October, Brett Gelman, Jessica Madsen, Justin Bartha, Cameron Britton and Bill Heck were added in recurring roles.

Filming had begun by January 2026, with scenes being filmed in Las Vegas. In November 2026, Apple released a first look at the series and announced that the series is scheduled to premiere on April 16, 2027.
