= Before Dawn (2024 film) =

2024 Australian film by Jordon Prince-Wright

Before Dawn is an Australian historical fiction dramatic war film. Directed by Jordon Prince-Wright from a screenplay by Jarrad Russell. It released in the United States on July 19th, 2024 after first premiering in Australia on April 4th, 2024.

== Plot ==
In 1916, Australian sheepherder Jim Collins enlists and discovers the horrors of war during the Battle of the Somme.

== Cast ==
- Levi Miller as Jim Collins
- Jordan Dulieu as Ned Wright
- Jason Burch as Arnold "Legs" Maxwell
- Ed Oxenbould as Don Pickett
- Travis Jeffery as Thomas Nickles
- Peter Sullivan as Archie
