= Jessica Madsen =

English actress

- Born: Jessica Shirley Madsen; 11 April 1992 (age 34); Westminster, London, England
- Education: Guildhall School of Music and Drama
- Occupation: Actress
- Years active: 2013–present

Jessica Shirley Madsen (born 11 April 1992) is an English actress. On television, she is known for her role as Cressida Cowper in the Netflix period drama Bridgerton (2020–). Her films include Leatherface (2017).

== Early life and education ==
Madsen was born in London to Jens Madsen and Julia Timewell and grew up in Surrey. Timewell, an artist, was born in what is now Zimbabwe and grew up in South Africa. Madsen's maternal great great aunt was the English writer Dorothy Whipple. She is of Danish descent on her father's side.

Madsen attended Notre Dame Preparatory School in Cobham for her primary education, and later Hurst Lodge School, and completed A Levels in Theatre, Media and English literature at Hurtwood House. She trained at the Guildhall School of Music and Drama, graduating in 2013.

== Career ==
Upon graduating from drama school, Madsen made her television debut in an episode of the 2013 ITV 1960s-set drama Breathless. This was followed by further appearances in an installment of the Sky Arts anthology Playhouse Presents and episodes of the Channel 4 comedy-drama Babylon, the BBC One medical soap opera Holby City, and the period drama Mr Selfridge, also on ITV. In addition, Madsen made her professional stage debut in Swimming at the Edinburgh Fringe Festival.

In 2017, Madsen made her feature film debut as Clarice in the horror film Leatherface, a prequel to The Texas Chain Saw Massacre, and played Jenny in the ITV three-part miniseries Tina and Bobby. In 2019, she appeared in the films Dark Light as Annie Knox and Rambo: Last Blood as Becky. Madsen was subsequently cast as Cressida Cowper in the 2020 Netflix period drama Bridgerton, an adaptation of the Regency romance novels by Julia Quinn. In October 2025, Madsen was announced to star alongside Honor Swinton Byrne and Sam Spruell in the feature film Tidepools, which began principal photography in Cornwall.

== Personal life ==
In June 2023, Madsen revealed she is bisexual via Instagram. The following June, she wrote that she is "In love with a woman, loud about it and proud about it!"

== Acting credits ==
=== Film ===
Year	Title	Role	Notes
2017	The Fowl	Steph	Short film
2017	Leatherface	Clarice	
2019	Dark Light	Annie Knox	
2019	Rambo: Last Blood	Becky	
2025	Tidepools	TBA	Filming

=== Television ===
Year	Title	Role	Notes
2013	Breathless	Miss Roper	1 episode
2014	Playhouse Presents		Episode: "Timeless"
2014	Babylon	Nina	1 episode
2015	Holby City	Minty Colquhoun	Episode: "Be Bold, Be Bold"
2015	Mr Selfridge	Polly Maxwell Taylor	2 episodes
2017	Tina and Bobby	Jenny Cox / Jenny Squibb	Miniseries
2020–2026	Bridgerton	Cressida Cowper	Recurring role (seasons 1–2); Main role (season 3); Guest (season 4)
TBA	Wild Things †	Lynette Chappell	Upcoming miniseries
TBA	Bloodaxe	Gunnhild	

=== Video games ===
Year	Title	Role	Notes
2017	Need for Speed Payback	Jessica Miller	

=== Theatre ===
Year	Title	Role	Notes
2014	Swimming	Lucy	The Pleasance, Edinburgh Fringe Festival

== Awards and nominations ==
Year	Award	Category	Work	Result	Ref.
2021	Screen Actors Guild Awards	Outstanding Performance by an Ensemble in a Drama Series	Bridgerton	Nominated	
