= American Exit =

2019 American drama thriller film

- Directed by: Tim McCann; Ingo Vollkammer
- Written by: Tim McCann; Ingo Vollkammer
- Produced by: Ross Kohn; Jennifer Konawal; Nancy Leopardi; Tim McCann; Ingo Vollkammer
- Starring: Dane Cook; Levi Miller
- Cinematography: Damian Horan
- Music by: Al Clay; Ryan Taubert
- Production company: Cosmopolis Entertainment
- Distributed by: Grindstone Entertainment Group
- Release date: May 14, 2019
- Running time: 86 minutes
- Country: United States
- Language: English

American Exit is a 2019 American adventure drama thriller film written and directed by Tim McCann and Ingo Vollkammer and starring Dane Cook and Levi Miller.

The film revolves around a dying desperate father who takes a road trip with his son to try to rebuild his relationship before he dies.

== Plot ==
Terminally ill father Charlie steals a valuable piece of art from the criminal art dealer Anton, enlisting his teenage son Leo to create a diversion. This action sparks a road trip during which they are relentlessly pursued by Anton and his accomplices, forcing Charlie to confront dangers that threaten more than just his own life.

== Cast ==
- Dane Cook as Charlie
- Levi Miller as Leo
- Udo Kier as Anton
- Claire van der Boom as Sofia
- Sebastian Sozzi as Gemini
- James Kwong as Body builder
