= The Moogai =

- Theatrical release poster
- Directed by: Jon Bell
- Written by: Jon Bell
- Produced by: Kristina Ceyton; Samantha Jennings; Mitchell Stanley
- Starring: Shari Sebbens; Meyne Wyatt; Tessa Rose; Clarence Ryan; Toby Leonard Moore; Bella Heathcote
- Cinematography: Sean Ryan
- Edited by: Simon Njoo
- Music by: Steve Francis
- Production companies: Causeway Films; No Coincidence Media
- Distributed by: Maslow Entertainment; Umbrella Entertainment; Ahi Films
- Release dates: 21 January 2024 (Sundance); 31 October 2024 (Australia)
- Running time: 86 minutes
- Country: Australia

The Moogai is a 2024 Australian horror film written and directed by Jon Bell, based on his 2020 short film of the same name. The film stars Shari Sebbens, Meyne Wyatt, Tessa Rose, Clarence Ryan, Toby Leonard Moore and Bella Heathcote. The film had its world premiere at the 2024 Sundance Film Festival on 21 January 2024, and was released in Australian cinemas on 31 October 2024. It won the 2024 CinefestOZ Film Prize.

== Synopsis ==
The story is about a young Aboriginal mother who believes that her child is possessed, and includes Indigenous Australian themes related to the Stolen Generations (a government policy of forced removal of Aboriginal children from their parents), the film explores themes including racism, post-natal depression, and transgenerational trauma. The film features an evil spirit ("Moogai" is a Bundjalung word meaning "bad spirit", similar to "boogie man", or Featherfoot) that takes children from their parents.

== Cast ==
- Shari Sebbens as Sarah
- Meyne Wyatt as Fergus
- Tessa Rose as Ruth
- Clarence Ryan as Ray Boy
- Toby Leonard Moore as Dr. Barnes
- Bella Heathcote as Becky
- Christian Byers as Constable Flatley
- Alexandra Jensen as Miss Miller
- Luke Ford as White Man #1

== Production ==
=== Background and short film ===
Jon Bell's short film of the same name was made as proof of concept for the feature film.

Bell is a Wiradjuri / Bundjalung / Yaegl man, hence the choice of the title in the Bundjalung language, which means "bad spirit" somewhat like the "boogie man". He said about the short film that he intended it to illuminate the intergenerational trauma faced by Aboriginal Australians in particular mothers whose children were forcibly removed from them, creating the Stolen Generations.

=== Feature film ===
Jon Bell said that his (feature) film is "a love letter to the Aboriginal women in his family", acknowledging the way that Aboriginal women "have continued to create families and hold families together in the face of hundreds of years of genocidal practices and policies", referring specifically to the policies under which Aboriginal children were removed from their families. He says that the horror genre provided the ability for him to explore the impact of the removals, which he does by "repurposing" tropes of the genre, which provides the commentary.

The Moogai was produced by Mitchell Stanley of No Coincidence Media, with Kristina Ceyton and Samantha Jennings, of Causeway Films. South Australian special effects company KOJO Studios was responsible for the visual effects. Marty Pepper of KOJO, who served as, executive director, post-production, created a replica of the set at his own property in Willunga to create effects during post-production.

== Release ==
The film premiered in the Midnight section of the 2024 Sundance Film Festival on 21 January. It had its Australian premiere at the 2024 Sydney Film Festival in June, later screening at the Melbourne International Film Festival and 2024 CinefestOZ in Perth. It was released in Australian cinemas by Maslow Entertainment, Umbrella Entertainment, and Ahi Films on 31 October 2024. In March 2025, the North American distribution rights were acquired by Samuel Goldwyn Films.

== Reception ==
Upon the world premiere of the feature film at the 2024 Sundance Film Festival, the film received mixed reviews. In his review for RogerEbert.com, Brian Tallerico suggested that "tightening the effects" would help the film, and hoping that it would be further refined before its theatrical release.

The film was more positively received by Australian reviewers and audiences upon its Australian premiere at the 2024 Sydney Film Festival, as it won the Audience Award for Best Australian Feature.

After its cinema release, Sandra Hall of The Sydney Morning Herald gave it 3 out of 5 stars, writing that "Bell is a skilled and experienced screenwriter", but it "doesn't give the actors enough time or space to embellish their characters [enough]", and the film "isn't as scary as it's trying to be".

Ali Alizadeh, a creative writing lecturer at Monash University, writing in The Conversation, praises Bell's talent, but felt that the film should have embraced more of the horror genre's "darker, more shocking aesthetics" rather than the greater focus on the thematic topics.

== Accolades ==
The short film The Moogai won the Grand Jury Prize in the Midnight Shorts category at SXSW in 2021, Best Horror Short at LA International Shorts Festival, and Film Victoria's Erwin Rado Award for Best Australian Short Film at Melbourne International Film Festival, which rendered it eligible to enter the Academy Awards. It also won Best Director (Shorts) at Brooklyn Horror Film Festival, and earned a nomination for an Australian Writers' Guild Award (AWGIE).

The feature The Moogai won the Audience Award for Best Feature at Sydney Film Festival, as well as the prestigious CinefestOZ Film Prize.
