= Glitch (Australian TV series) =

Australian paranormal drama television series

- Genre: Drama; Paranormal
- Created by: Louise Fox; Tony Ayres
- Based on: An idea by Adam Hill & Tony Ayres
- Written by: Louise Fox; Kris Mrksa; Giula Sandler; Pete McTighe; Adam Hill
- Directed by: Emma Freeman; Tony Krawitz
- Starring: Patrick Brammall; Genevieve O'Reilly; Emma Booth; Emily Barclay; Ned Dennehy; Sean Keenan; Hannah Monson; Aaron L. McGrath; Daniela Farinacci; Andrew McFarlane; Rodger Corser; John Leary; Luke Arnold; Rob Collins; Pernilla August; Zach Butson
- Composer: Cornel Wilczek
- Country of origin: Australia
- Original language: English
- No. of series: 3
- No. of episodes: 18

Production
- Executive producers: Tony Ayres; Louise Fox; Christopher Gist; Debbie Lee; Carole Sklan; JoAnn Alfano; Scott Herbst; Alastair McKinnon; Chris Oliver-Taylor; Sally Riley; Brett Sleigh
- Producers: Ewan Burnett; Louise Fox; Julie Eckersley; Emma Freeman
- Production locations: Castlemaine, Monegeetta, Riddells Creek, Victoria, Australia
- Cinematography: Simon Chapman; Earle Dresner; Aaron McLisky
- Editors: Mark Atkin; Peter Carrodus; Angie Higgins
- Running time: 51–57 minutes
- Production companies: Matchbox Pictures; NBCUniversal International Studios

Original release
- Network: ABC; Netflix
- Release: 9 July 2015 – 29 September 2019

Glitch is an Australian supernatural drama television series developed by Tony Ayres and Louise Fox. Set in the fictional country town of Yoorana, Victoria, it follows seven people who return from the dead in perfect health but with no memory. No one in the town knows why the deceased have returned. Glitch premiered on 9 July 2015 on ABC and the first series was awarded Best Television Drama Series at the 2016 AACTA Awards. The series also won Most Outstanding Drama Series at the 2016 Logie Awards.

On 26 October 2015, ABC TV renewed the show for a second series of six episodes. The second series premiered on 14 September 2017 on ABC. Series two follows James and the Risen as they begin to unravel the mystery of how and why they are back, though their journey of reconciliation, romance, and revenge is soon disrupted by a new and even more lethal threat. The first series was made available to stream on Netflix globally on 15 October 2016. Series 2 premiered on 28 November 2017 internationally on Netflix. The show concluded with the third season, which premiered on 25 August 2019.

== Plot ==
James Hayes is a small town policeman in Yoorana, Victoria. He is called to the local cemetery in the middle of the night, only to discover some people that have risen from the dead in perfect health but with no memory of their identities or past. They are determined to find out who they are and what has happened to them. James struggles to keep the mysterious case hidden from his colleagues, family, and the world, with the help of local doctor Elishia McKellar. The people are all linked in some way, and the search begins for someone who knows the truth about how and why they have returned.

== Cast ==
=== Main ===
- Patrick Brammall as Sgt. James Hayes
- Genevieve O'Reilly as Dr. Elishia McKellar (series 1–2)
- Emma Booth as Kate Willis
- Emily Barclay as Sarah Hayes (series 1–2)
- Ned Dennehy as Patrick "Paddy" Fitzgerald (series 1–2)
- Sean Keenan as Charlie Thompson
- Hannah Monson as Kirsten "Kirstie" Darrow
- Aaron McGrath as Beau Cooper
- Rodger Corser as John Doe/William Blackburn
- Andrew McFarlane as Vic Eastley (series 1–2)
- Daniela Farinacci as Maria Rose Massola (series 1)
- John Leary as Chris Rennox
- Luke Arnold as Owen Nillson (series 2–3)
- Rob Collins as Phil Holden (series 2–3)
- Pernilla August as Nicola Heysen (series 2–3)
- Jessica Faulkner as Belle Donohue (series 3)
- Harry Tseng as Tam "Chi" Chi Wai (series 3)
- Dustin Clare as Mark Clayton-Stone (series 3)

=== Recurring ===
- Anni Finsterer as Caroline Eastley
- Lisa Flanagan as Kath
- Robert Menzies as Pete Rennox
- Tessa Rose as Sharon
- Gerard Kennedy as Leon Massola
- Antonio Kapusi-Starow as Young Leon
- Phoebe Gorozidis as Anna
- Alison Whyte as Lucy Fitzgerald
- Nicholas Denton as Angus Fitzgerald
- Jacob Collins-Levy as Rory Fitzgerald
- Greg Stone as Russell
- Leila Gurruwiwi as Kalinda
- James Monarski as Carlo Nico
- Katrina Milosevic as Ellen
- Lex Marinos as Steve Tripidakis
- Max Brown as David Goldman
- Dalip Sondhi as Samarvart Chadra Gard
- Rhys Mitchell as Young Paddy
- Jackson Gallagher as Raf
- Susan Prior as Anne Donohue
- Taylor Ferguson as Judith Donohue
- Reef Ireland as Luke Donohue
- Simon Maiden as Duncan
- Alex Rowe as Young Pete Rennox
- Joe Klocek as Josh

=== Guests ===
- Anna McGahan as Millie
- Eddie Baroo as Gary
- Freya Stafford as Amy
- Marta Kaczmarek as Registrar
- Shareena Clanton as Elena Triggs
- Syd Brisbane as Cam
- Tom Budge as Rob

== Production ==
Although the show bears remarkable similarity to the 2012 French series Les Revenants, which was broadcast internationally as The Returned and adapted as an American series with that title, the writers insist Glitch was not influenced by it and "the first script was written before I even saw the French film of The Returned."

== Episodes ==
Series	Episodes	Originally released		
Series	Episodes	First released	Last released	Network
1	6	9 July 2015	13 August 2015	ABC & Netflix
2	6	14 September 2017	19 October 2017	ABC & Netflix
3	6	25 August 2019	29 September 2019	ABC & Netflix

=== Season 1 (2015) ===
No. overall	No. in series	Title	Directed by	Written by	Original release date	Australian viewers
1	1	"The Risen"	Emma Freeman	Louise Fox	9 July 2015	511,000
Sergeant James Hayes is called to the cemetery late at night to find six naked, filthy, disoriented people. He begins an investigation and is shocked to discover that one of them is his late wife Kate, who had died two years before. The returned remember their first names, but all except Kate seem not to know who they are. Carlo speaks only Italian; he realizes who he is late in the episode and begins talking about his brother Alessandro. Dr Elishia McKellar happens to be treating a man named Alessandro who is in his 90s, so James takes Carlo to see him. On the road to Alessandro's house, Carlo begins bleeding from the eyes. James stops to see if he is all right; Carlo leaves the car and turns to ash as he crosses the bridge. James tells Dr McKellar what happened, asking her to keep it secret until they can learn more about what is happening. Vic finds Carlo's grave after witnessing his death on the bridge. James goes home; he has a new wife who is pregnant. Another man is seen digging his way out of his grave.
2	2	"Am I in Hell?"	Emma Freeman	Kris Mrksa	16 July 2015	442,000
Kate remembers that she underwent a mastectomy, but now she has her breasts again. Dr McKellar runs some tests on her and does not find any irregularities, meaning that her cancer seems to have gone. The man seen emerging from his grave at the end of the previous episode runs into a female change room. The Risen try to work out who they are and why they have returned. Kirsten starts to experience bleeding as she and James approach the bridge where Carlo died, and James stops the car. Meanwhile, James is torn between his two loves and turns to Vic for help. Fearing for their safety, Elishia hides the Risen from Vic. Kate and Maria run to the cemetery, where Maria realizes that her daughter Anna is also dead. They then go to Kate and James' house, and Kate is devastated to learn that James has a new wife, her old friend Sarah. Vic has an accident while driving his car, but he seems to be left with only a gash on his forehead. Elishia takes the Risen to an unknown location and will not tell James where they are.
3	3	"Miracle or Punishment"	Emma Freeman	Giulia Sanders	23 July 2015	N/A
Vic is behaving very strangely after his accident and is obsessed with finding the Risen. James finds Maria in a church. She tells him to take her to see her husband, who is suffering from dementia in a rest home, in exchange for her taking him to where the rest of the Risen are hidden. During the visit, her husband calls her a whore, distressing her and prompting her to remember a scene in which a boy tried to caress her legs. Maria and James go to see that boy, now a middle-aged man, and Maria asks what happened on that occasion. He says that she slapped him. James asks him how Maria died, and he replies "in a car accident." Meanwhile, Elisha and the rest of the Risen realize that there is an invisible boundary around the town. Paddy has a revelation about his identity and takes a box from his old house. Kate and James spend the night together. As the episode comes to a close, Maria is crying at her daughter's tomb, and Vic approaches her saying that he has been looking for her to help her.
4	4	"There Is No Justice"	Emma Freeman	Kris Mrksa & Louise Fox	30 July 2015	N/A
Vic convinces Maria that Elishia is not really trying to help them, but that she is trying to use them for her own professional gain. He convinces her to take him to the Risen by making her believe that they can bring her daughter back to life. She realises that he is not really trying to help her; she tries to get away from him but he kills her. Kirstie gets restless and sets off to find some answers for herself, and James helps her discover that she was murdered and her boyfriend was convicted—but she realises that he did not do it. John leaves the group due to his unpredictable and aggressive behaviour and ends up assaulting a store clerk. He later attempts suicide due to his inability to remember anything about his past. Elishia helps him uncover his past as a murderer. James gets a tip on Paddy and finds him in the woods and takes him to the others. After much effort, Paddy finally opens the box that he took from his house. Kate reveals herself to James' new wife Sarah.
5	5	"The Impossible Triangle"	Emma Freeman	Louise Fox	6 August 2015	332,000
Sarah struggles to come to terms with Kate being alive. She, James, and Kate try to navigate their complex love triangle and come to terms with what to do. Charlie uncovers some confusing things about his past from a local bar keep, while Vic tracks down Elishia and John. Vic is aggressive with Elishia, and John attacks him, but Vic gets the upper hand with his gun and forces Elishia to call James. Paddy remembers his wife and realises he is kin to Beau and his family. He enlists Beau to help him get his house and wealth back. Vic attacks James, Elishia, Paddy and Beau but injures himself chasing them, and they finally get the upper hand. James discovers Maria's body in Vic's car.
6	6	"There Must Be Rules"	Emma Freeman	Louise Fox	13 August 2015	383,000
Elishia and James deduce that Vic killed Maria, and James tries to confront him as to why she was missing. Vic is given Morphine by Elishia before he can answer, raising suspicion. Elishia operates on Vic due to the injury he sustained in the chase earlier. Chris picks up Kate after stopping her on her motorcycle, and she listens tearfully as he speaks to Kate's mum on his phone. Chris then locks her in a cell at the station. When Vic awakens from the operation, he gives John a silver whistle that Elishia had found in his grave. John uses it, and everyone suddenly remembers everything about their deaths. This leads John to believe Vic, so he helps to force all the Risen into Elishia's van and they take them to the bridge out of town. As they attempt to force everyone over the bridge, James begs them to stop before shooting Vic in the head, killing him. Sarah goes into labour but there are complications after the birth. Chris tells James Dr. Elishia McKeller died 4 years ago.

=== Season 2 (2017) ===
No. overall	No. in series	Title	Directed by	Written by	Original release date	Australian viewers
7	1	"The Rare Bird"	Emma Freeman	Louise Fox	14 September 2017	N/A
Four years ago, Elishia wakes up in a morgue. In the present, James remains suspicious of Sarah, who seems to be recovering quickly, has memory loss, and is acting erratic. James asks to see Vic's grave and it is revealed that the Risen cannot get to his grave due to the invisible barrier blocking them. The barrier appears to be moving or shrinking. John breaks into a house and is approached by a woman, Dr. Nicola Heysen, who knows exactly who he is. She says that Elishia used to work for her and offers him information on how Elishia brought the Risen back. Nicola reveals to John that his real name is William Blackburn. James investigates Elishia and talks to her former partner and discovers she was researching cell regeneration before she died of a stroke four years ago. Caroline tells Chris that Vic is missing. Chris asks James to help him track down his phone at the property where the Risen are. Kate gets close with a local named Owen. Beau's step-dad Phil returns after an explosion on his oil rig. Elishia comes to James' house to ask for help saving John, as Sarah watches through the window.
8	2	"Two Truths"	Tony Krawitz	Louise Fox	21 September 2017	N/A
James is shocked to discover Owen and Kate in bed. Elishia has returned, so James, Kate, and Kirstie grill Elishia for answers but she claims ignorance, blaming Noregard for everything. Dr. Heysen starts conducting brutal experiments on John. Phil settles in to life back in Yoorana, but he's clearly changed. Home alone with her newborn daughter, Sarah struggles. Determined to check Elishia's story, James and Kate enter Noregard hoping to have their questions answered. Dr. Heysen refuses to comply and sends them away. Kirstie and Charlie set off to uncover more information on their own histories, both determined to help each other discover the truth of them. Paddy discovers more clues to his past. Kate visits Owen to discuss their night together. John discovers his true name and remembers the old whistle that he was buried with. He escapes Noregard and makes his way back to Elishia for answers. Meanwhile, Phil tracks down Elishia.
9	3	"All Too Human"	Tony Krawitz	Giulia Sanders	28 September 2017	N/A
James admits to Sarah that he killed Vic. She tries to persuade James to tell Chris everything. Phil enters the house where the Risen are sleeping and absorbs info from them without waking them. He is looking for Elishia but she and William have left. Elishia tries to help William understand how they are connected. She tells him that she brought him back on purpose and the others were just an accident. They discover the boundary is contracting even further. Sarah admits she has had a headache since Nia was born. Later she continues to communicate with Phil to help him find Elishia. They meet in the park and Phil absorbs info from her about Dr Heysen. He asks her if she knows why she is here and if she knows what she needs to do, and she says she does now. She later reveals her headache is gone and she wants to help find Elishia. Elishia reveals to William they used to be lovers. She vows to fix the boundary. Phil follows Dr. Heysen to the cemetery where Elishia is to wait to meet with her. After Dr. Heysen leaves, Phil chases Elishia down and stabs her in the neck, leaving her in the river where James and William find her dead.
10	4	"A Duty of Care"	Tony Krawitz	Louise Fox	5 October 2017	N/A
James and William bury Elishia. Phil comes to Sarah's house to clean up from his injury and he leaves his bloody clothes at her house. The two talk about their purpose. He has fulfilled his by killing Elishia but says that Sarah has not fulfilled hers yet. Heysen reveals she knows about Vic and his crash where he died but thinks he brought himself back. James still does not trust Heysen. Kirstie tries to get info out of her old friend Vicky who lied to the police. Sarah takes a gun to the house where the Risen are staying. James realizes that Owen has a previous conviction for manslaughter and goes after him. William discovers that his fingers are growing back and takes Elishia's research folder for Heysen. Paddy's persistence to get his estate returned causes him to encounter some issues. Sarah finds Charlie and tries to kill him but suffers a haemorrhage. Sarah tells James to take Nia home, but he goes to Heysen's hotel room and discovers she has gone with William. He then gets home and finds Phil's bloody clothes. He confronts Sarah with them. Meanwhile, it is revealed that Chris's brother is the one that killed Kirstie.
11	5	"The Walking Wounded"	Emma Freeman	Pete McTighe	12 October 2017	N/A
Kirstie tells Chris that his brother Peter killed her. Sarah distracts James from asking her questions about Phil's bloody clothes by telling him about the haemorrhage. The Fitzgerald boys attack Paddy and tie him to his house that is about to be demolished, and they take his will. James finds out from Beau that Phil is in town and suspects him of Elishia's murder. Adeline frees Paddy. Heysen and William replicate the vibration that Elishia was using in her research. Kate thinks she asked Sarah to help her die and asks Sarah for the truth. Sarah tells her that she stole the drugs for Kate's suicide but could not give them to her. Sarah apologises for not helping her then reaches for her gun but is interrupted by a car pulling up. Sarah tells Phil that James knows who he is. Chris runs into Kirstie at the lake house and is attacked by Phil who is there to kill the Risen. James arrives and subdues Phil with Chris and Kirstie's help. He takes him back to town and places him in a holding cell. Meanwhile, Charlie remembers that he committed suicide to avoid dying slowly of TB, and Paddy is killed by Sarah.
12	6	"The Letter"	Emma Freeman	Louise Fox	19 October 2017	N/A
James gets Phil to admit that he is like Vic and their purpose was to kill Elishia for breaking the "rules" of the universe. Beau tells James about Paddy, who turns to dust. Kate reveals her secret and breaks it off with Owen. Paddy's lawyer comes to Beau's house with an offer of 2 million dollars and a certain heirloom to release the Fitzgerald estate from any future claims. Sarah frees Phil while the Risen seek sanctuary at the Noregard facility. Heysen offers to help them fix the boundary. James discovers that Sarah is like Phil and is working with him. Charlie is wounded by Sarah as he and the others escape. They steal a van and head to the cemetery, where Heysen and William are preparing the experiment. After a struggle with James, Phil is shot by Sarah, but before dying he raises James' gun and kills Sarah. The boundary is reset. Later, James takes Nia to visit his parents while Beau scatters Paddy's remains at Corona Hill. William keeps a vigil at the cemetery. The symbol depicted in Elishia's notes has formed in the ground around where Elishia was buried.

=== Season 3 (2019) ===
No. overall	No. in series	Title	Directed by	Written by	Original release date	Australian viewers
13	1	"Mum"	Emma Freeman	Louise Fox	25 August 2019	N/A
William waits at the cemetery for Elishia to come back; she remains dead. As an unexpected side-effect, two new Risen, Belle and Chi, crawl from the graves and wander toward Yoorana, regaining some memories. Chi remembers beginning work as a Chinese laborer after his career as a Chinese opera star ended. Belle remembers climbing the Water Wheel with her siblings. The two return to Belle's family home; it's been 15 years. Belle's family drives Chi away, and force her to undergo extreme religious rituals to "purify" her, believing her to be possessed by a demon. Her sister, Judith, tries to free her, but her family catches them. They decide to let Belle burn alive. Chi rescues her. Kate & Owen leave to visit Kate's family. Kirstie & Charlie get on a bus out of Yoorana. James takes Nia to his parents to try and deal with Sarah's death, but reacts hostilely to questions. While out with his father, James slips in a bar restroom and appears to have died momentarily, returning and appearing changed like Vic, Sarah, and Phil. Chi is befriended by Trevor Yang, who owns Yoorana's Chinese restaurant and helps him. Professor Heysen decides to track down the Risen, sending security after them. She also tests Phil, revealed not to have died from Sarah's gun shot. Phil kills her after an argument.
14	2	"Quintessence"	Emma Freeman	Pete McTighe	1 September 2019	N/A
Kate and Owen suffer a punctured tyre on their road trip requiring them to seek help at a nearby pub, where Owen's true intentions with Kate are revealed. William sees the future where he believes Elishia is still alive and his vision leads him to the Melbourne Star. Mark finally tracks down William. William decides to head back to Yoorana where James finds him along the way, the two of them make a realization.
15	3	"First Times"	Emma Freeman	Giula Sandler	8 September 2019	N/A
Kirstie and Charlie embark on their Melbourne adventure. Kirstie discovers something disastrous about herself that she plans on fixing. Charlie has an unexpected love interest stumble into his life, literally. After Mark's encounter with William, he goes about pursuing the other Risen. Chris contacts Kirstie and Charlie, but when the phone connection drops out with Kirstie, and Charlie hangs up on Chris, Chris heads to Melbourne. Beau finds Phil in his yard and attempts to attack him. Phil stops him and explains that he wants to make everything right. Later, while running errands, Phil sees Kate back in town and chases her down. He confesses that he is no longer out to harm the Risen as he too wants to live a life of his own.
16	4	"Perfectly Safe"	Emma Freeman	Kris Mrksa	15 September 2019	N/A
Chi believes he's found his descendant and asks him for help to set his spirit free. Mark takes Kirstie and Charlie to Sam, one of Noregard's board of directors. James speaks to Beau after receiving his call and confides in William that maybe Phil is right in wanting to live life, and that they are the ones who could be wrong. After Kate ties up Phil, the two have an in-depth discussion and Kate comes to trust Phil. Chris, Kate and Phil attempt to break out Kirstie and Charlie from Noregard. Kirstie and Charlie take up Sam's offer to live in Sweden. Chi and Belle meet Kate, Kirstie, Charlie and Phil. James and William reunite with the Risen.
17	5	"The Enemy"	Emma Freeman	Pete McTighe	22 September 2019	N/A
James takes Phil home to get him out of the way. Chris shows Belle her police statement of her death and how her mother lied in the report about how she died. Pete Rennox falls down the stairs in his wheelchair. Chris checks and Pete has no pulse, but miraculously opens his eyes and walks away. Kirstie meets Sam in secret. Pete reveals to Chris that he killed Kirstie and that he'll have to do it again. Chris pushes him off cliff to die. Phil figures out that James is just like him after witnessing broken mug.
18	6	"Little Gidding"	Emma Freeman	Louise Fox	29 September 2019	N/A
William and James takes Phil into woods and William stabs him as revenge for killing Elishia. Kate shoots William after what she witnessed with Phil. Kate, Kirstie and Charlie seek refuge with Chris. Chris arrests James for Vic's murder and locks him up. Kirstie goes to Noregard. Belle and Chi go to warn her sister about the coming fire. Chi experiences a startling flashback involving Paddy that shakes him to the core. Two of Noregard's staff tase Kate, Charlie and Raf, and then Chris and Kirstie, but James and William take back control of the situation. Mark manages to capture Belle and Chi at a separate point. They all rendezvous at the cemetery while the fire blazes around them killing them all. 20 years later we witness Yoorana back to its normal life through the eyes of Chris, the only survivor, and Nia, now 20.

== Broadcast ==
Glitch was screened at Roma Fiction Fest in 2015.

Glitch premiered on 9 July 2015 on ABC and the first series was awarded Best Television Drama Series at the 2016 AACTA Awards. The series also won Most Outstanding Drama Series at the 2016 Logie Awards. The show concluded with the third season, which premiered on ABC 25 August 2019.

The first series was made available to stream on Netflix globally on 15 October 2016. Series 2 premiered on 28 November 2017 internationally on Netflix. Netflix globally released series 3 on 25 September 2019.

== Home media ==
Title	Format	Episodes	Discs	Release date (Region 4 Australia)	Distributor	Notes
Glitch: Season 01	DVD	6	2	1 October 2015	Universal Sony Pictures	Includes Special Features
Glitch: Season 02	DVD	6	2	29 November 2017	Universal Sony Pictures	Includes Special Features
Glitch: Season 03	DVD	6	2	16 October 2019	Universal Sony Pictures	None
Glitch: Seasons 01–03	DVD	18	6	16 October 2019	Universal Sony Pictures	Includes Special Features

== Reception ==
On the review aggregator website Rotten Tomatoes, season 1 of Glitch has an approval rating of 80% based on 5 reviews. Likewise, season 2 has an approval rating of 80% based on 5 reviews. Season 3 was poorly received, with the final episode in particular getting the lowest rating of all.

=== Awards and nominations ===
Year	Award	Category	Recipient	Result
2017	AACTA Awards	Best Television Drama	Glitch 2	Nominated
2017	Screen Producers Australia	Best Drama Series	Glitch S2	Nominated
2016	Australian Directors' Guild Awards	Best Direction in a Television Drama Series	Emma Freeman	Won
2016	AACTA Awards	Best Television Drama	Glitch	Won
2016	AACTA Awards	Best Supporting Actress	Hannah Monson	Nominated
2016	AACTA Awards	Best Original Score in Television	Cornel Wilczek, Episode 4	Won
2015	TV Week Logies	Most Outstanding Supporting Actress	Emily Barclay	Nominated
2015	TV Week Logies	Most Outstanding Newcomer	Hannah Monson	Nominated
2015	TV Week Logies	Logie Award for Most Outstanding Actor	Patrick Brammall	Nominated
2015	TV Week Logies	Most Outstanding Drama Series	Glitch	Won
2015	Screen Producers Australia	Best Drama Series	Glitch	Nominated
2015	Australian Writers Guild	Best Screenplay in Television	Glitch	Nominated

== See also ==
- Les Revenants
- The Returned
- Resurrection
- Revival
