= Cody Grace =

Australian gridiron football player (born 1996)

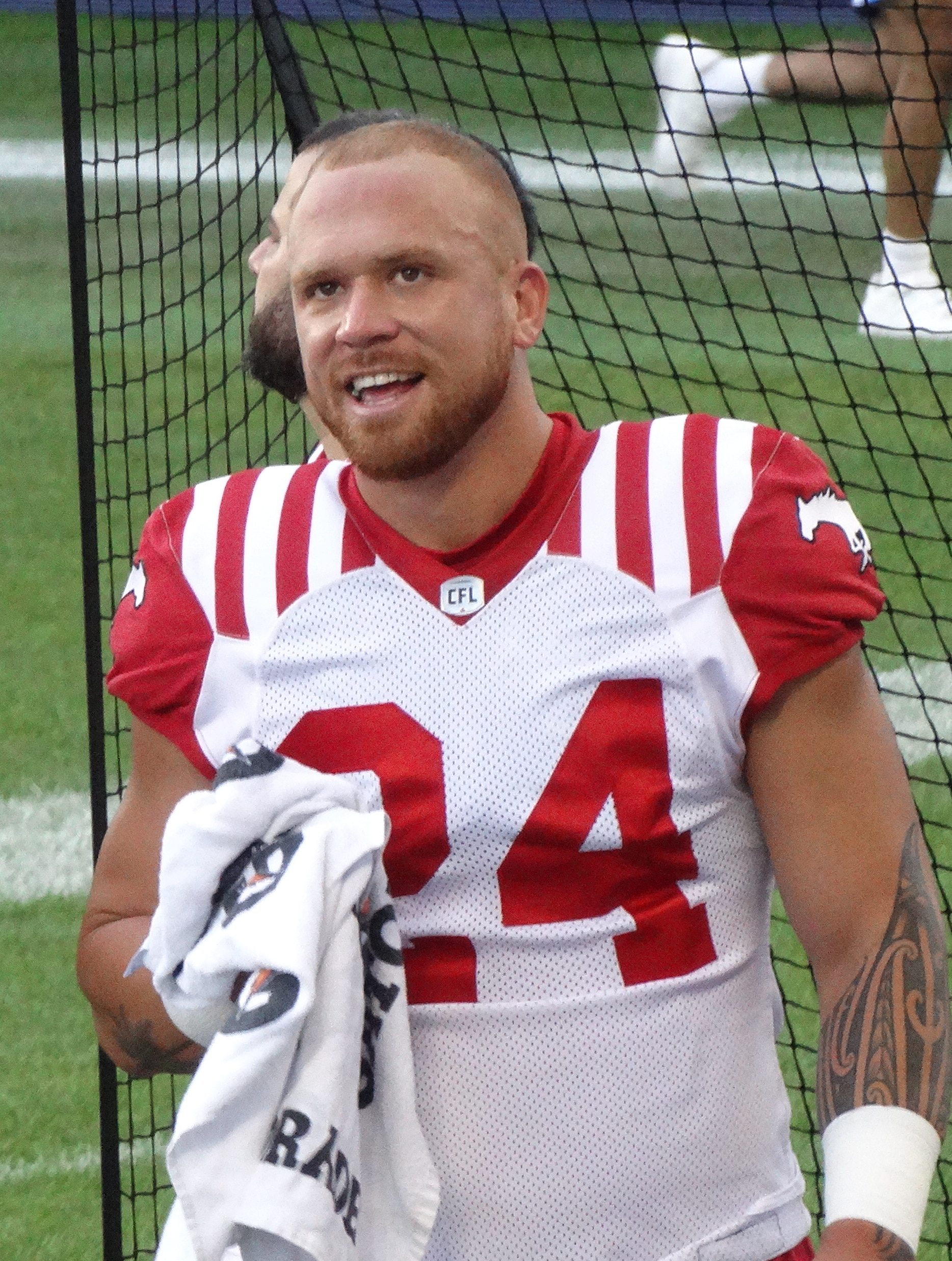
- Grace with the Calgary Stampeders in 2024

No. 24
- Position: Punter

Personal information
- Born: 19 March 1996 (age 30); Perth, Western Australia, Australia
- Listed height: 6 ft 1 in (1.85 m)
- Listed weight: 228 lb (103 kg)

Career information
- High school: Warwick Senior High
- College: Arkansas State
- CFL draft: 2021G: 1st round, 7th overall pick

Career history
- 2021–2024: Calgary Stampeders
- 2025: Edmonton Elks

Awards and highlights
- CFL All-Star (2022); 2× CFL West All-Star (2021, 2022); First-team All-Sun Belt (2019); Second-team All-Sun Belt (2018)
- Stats at CFL.ca

Cody Grace (born 19 March 1996) is an Australian professional Canadian football punter.

== Early life ==
Grace grew up in Perth, Western Australia, where he attended Warwick Senior High School and played Australian rules football.

== College career ==
Grace played college football for the Arkansas State Red Wolves from 2017 to 2019.

== Professional career ==
=== Calgary Stampeders ===
Grace was drafted in the first round, seventh overall by the Calgary Stampeders in the 2021 CFL global draft and signed with the team on 11 May 2021. Following 2021 training camp, he won the job as the team's punter and played in his first career professional game on 7 August 2021, against the Toronto Argonauts. He played in 14 regular season games and had 78 punts with a 45.6-yard average. He was named a CFL Western All-Star at the end of the year and became the first Global player to win the award.

=== Edmonton Elks ===
Grace joined the Edmonton Elks in free agency on February 12, 2025. He became a free agent again after the 2025 season.
