= KGB (TV series) =

Australian drama television miniseries

- Genre: Comedy; Crime
- Created by: Luke Riches; Dan Riches
- Written by: Luke Riches; Dan Riches; Joel Gray; Clare Toonen
- Directed by: Luke Riches; Dan Riches
- Starring: Clarence Ryan; Bjorn Stewart
- Country of origin: Australia
- Original language: English
- No. of series: 1
- No. of episodes: 5

Production
- Executive producers: Lauren Elliott; Kelrick Martin; Margaret Ross
- Producer: Taryne Laffar
- Cinematography: Michael McDermott
- Running time: 6 minutes

Original release
- Network: ABC
- Release: 7 July 2019

KGB is an Australian comedy television series. Created and directed by Luke and Dan Riches, it starred Clarence Ryan and Bjorn Stewart as a pair of detectives in the Perth suburbs of Koondoola, Girrawheen and Balga. It was released by the ABC for NAIDOC Week in 2019 and had nearly 100,000 plays in its first two weeks.

== Cast ==
- Clarence Ryan as Jack
- Bjorn Stewart as Nigel
- Mark Coles Smith as William
- Jesse Phillips as David
- Aaron L. McGrath as Roland
- Genevieve Morris as Captain Stokes
- Ningali Lawford as Jack's Mum
- Lynette Narkle as Aunty Doris

== Reception ==
Writing in X-Press Magazine Natalie Giles gave it 9/10. She writes "Brilliantly timed comedic moments from the cast following some sharply tuned writing from the Riches brothers, and we can only hope that this short web series sets a precedent for a full season if the ABC comes to the party." Travis Akbar of the Curb says "Overall, KGB is fun ride. Well written, passionately acted and funny at all times, it not something you want to miss."

== Awards ==
- 10th AACTA Awards
  - Best Online Drama or Comedy - Dan Riches, Luke Riches, Taryne Laffar, Lauren Elliott - nominated
