= Pan (2015 film) =

2015 American film directed by Joe Wright

- Theatrical release poster
- Directed by: Joe Wright
- Written by: Jason Fuchs
- Based on: Peter Pan by J. M. Barrie
- Produced by: Greg Berlanti; Sarah Schechter; Paul Webster
- Starring: Hugh Jackman; Garrett Hedlund; Rooney Mara; Amanda Seyfried; Levi Miller
- Cinematography: Seamus McGarvey; John Mathieson
- Edited by: Paul Tothill; William Hoy
- Music by: John Powell
- Production companies: Berlanti Productions; RatPac-Dune Entertainment
- Distributed by: Warner Bros. Pictures
- Release dates: September 20, 2015 (London); October 9, 2015 (United States)
- Running time: 111 minutes
- Country: United States
- Language: English
- Budget: $150 million
- Box office: $152 million

Pan is a 2015 American fantasy film directed by Joe Wright and written by Jason Fuchs. The film is an alternate prequel to the 1904 play Peter Pan; or, the Boy Who Wouldn't Grow Up, better known for its 1911 novelization, Peter and Wendy, by Scottish author J. M. Barrie, and focuses on an alternate origin story for Peter Pan and Captain Hook. It stars Hugh Jackman as a fictionalized version of Blackbeard, Garrett Hedlund as Hook, Rooney Mara as Tiger Lily, and Levi Miller as Peter Pan.

Pan's world premiere was held in London on September 20, 2015, and it was theatrically released in the United States on October 9, 2015, by Warner Bros. Pictures. Pan was a box-office failure, only grossing $152 million against a production budget of $150 million, resulting in a significant loss for the studio, and received generally negative reviews from critics, who criticized the writing, the plot, characterization, the casting of Mara, and the heavy over-reliance on special effects, though the performances and musical score received some praise.

== Plot ==
Newborn Peter is left on the steps of a London orphanage with a mysterious pan flute pendant by his mother Mary. Years later during World War II, upon learning that the abusive Mother Barnabas is hoarding food and riches for herself, Peter and his best friend Nibs are caught trying to steal the food for the orphans. In the process, they find a letter written to Peter by his mother, declaring her love and assuring him they will meet again "in this world or another".

Mother Barnabas summons pirates who kidnap Peter, Nibs and several other orphans. Nibs manages to escape, but Peter is taken aboard a flying pirate ship. Following an aerial battle with several Spitfires, the ship reaches Neverland, where the children are forced to mine for Pixum – crystallized Fairy Dust—for the pirate Blackbeard, who uses the substance to prevent himself from aging.

Taken captive by Blackbeard's right-hand man Bishop, Peter meets the miner, James Hook. After insulting Blackbeard's men, Peter is forced to walk the plank over the deep mine, but survives by flying. Blackbeard tells him about the native tribe's prophecy of a flying boy who would lead an uprising to kill him, but Peter refuses to believe in "bedtime stories".

Peter joins Hook and his accomplice, Sam "Smee" Smiegel, in stealing a flying ship and escaping into the forest. Determined to find his mother, Peter refuses to leave Neverland. They are found by the native chief's daughter Tiger Lily and nearly executed, but Chief Great Little Panther notices Peter's pendant, which is said to belong to their people's greatest hero, the legendary Pan.

Using the Memory Tree, Tiger Lily tells Peter that many years ago, when the natives and fairies united against the pirates, the Fairy Prince and Mary, the love of Blackbeard's life, fell in love. When Blackbeard discovered them, the Prince took human form and sacrificed himself to rescue Mary, as fairies can live as humans for only one day. She was forced to hide their son Peter in the other world and seek shelter in the Fairy Kingdom. As half-fairy, Peter has the ability to fly but is unable to do so because of his lack of faith.

Fearful of Blackbeard, Smee betrays the natives' location, and in the ensuing battle Chief Great Little Panther is shot by Blackbeard, who reveals that he killed Mary. Peter is hurt to learn that Tiger Lily lied to him that his mother was still alive, but she explains that he would have walked away from his destiny if he knew the truth.

Peter, Hook, and Tiger Lily escape in a raft to enlist the help of the Fairy Kingdom. They are attacked by a giant crocodile and Peter is nearly eaten before being rescued by the mermaids. Tiger Lily shows Peter a vision of Blackbeard accidentally killing Mary as she defended the Fairy Kingdom, revealing she was a great warrior who trained Tiger Lily herself.

Hook leaves on an abandoned ship to find home while Peter and Tiger Lily arrive at the Fairy Kingdom, only to be ambushed by Blackbeard. Planning to use the fairies' vast amount of Pixum to live forever, Blackbeard takes Peter's pendant, the key to the Fairy Kingdom, and opens their gates, launching an attack.

Peter escapes and meets the fairy Tinker Bell. Hook returns and fights Blackbeard's right-hand man Bishop while Tiger Lily duels Blackbeard, and the ship tips over, sending Hook and Bishop plummeting. Peter conquers his fears and flies to save Hook, then rallies the fairies against the pirates to save Tiger Lily. Blackbeard and his men are forced into an abyss to their deaths, with only Smee having fled. Peter sees a vision of Mary, who reaffirms him to be Neverland's savior: Peter Pan.

Peter, Tiger Lily and Hook, now captain of the Jolly Roger, return to London to rescue Nibs and the other orphans, who become Peter's crew, the Lost Boys. Hook and Tiger Lily fall somewhat in love, and Peter and Hook reaffirm their friendship, certain nothing will ever go wrong between them.

== Cast ==
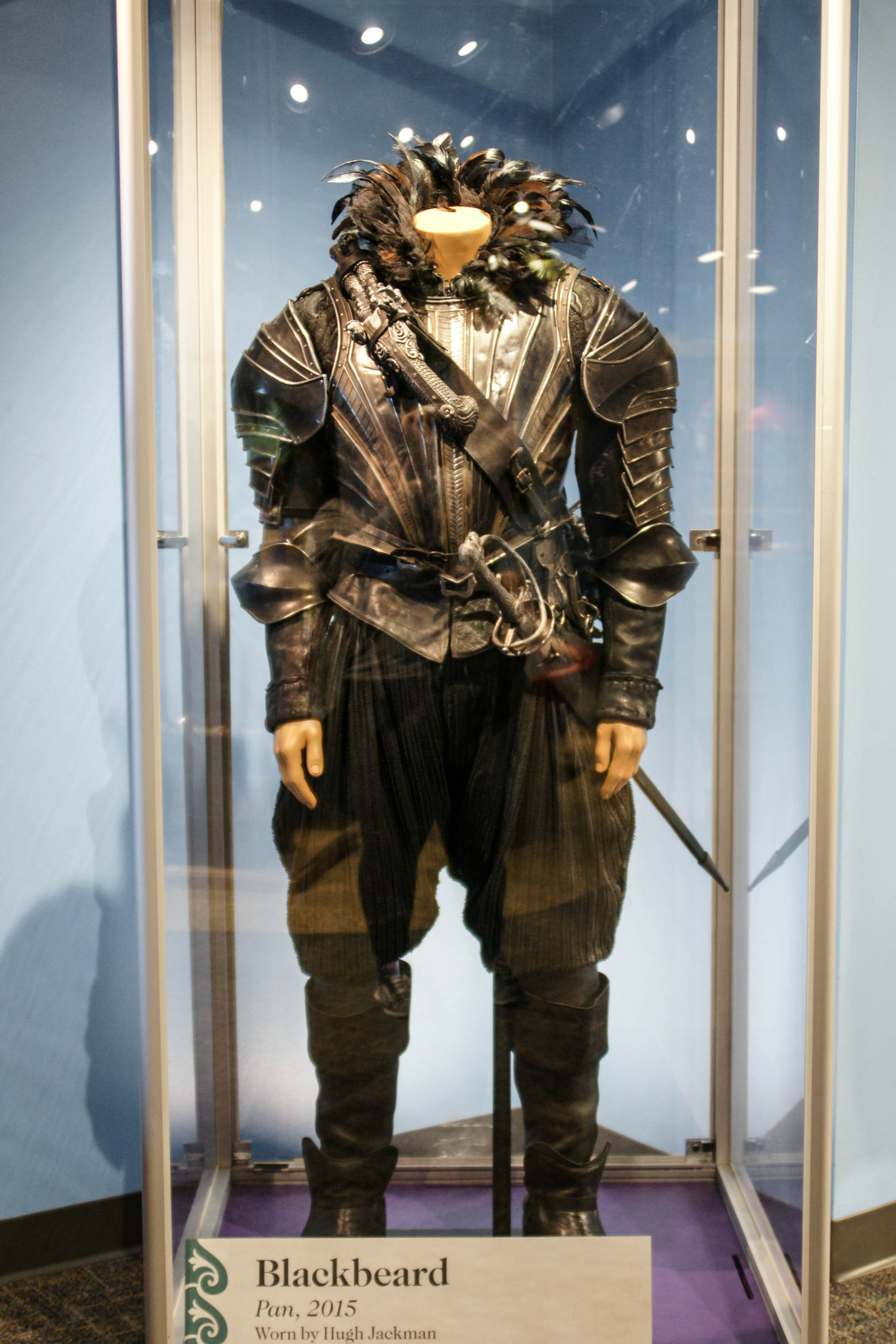
Hugh Jackman's Blackbeard costume on display at The Children's Museum of Indianapolis in 2015

- Levi Miller as Peter Pan
- Garrett Hedlund as James Hook
- Hugh Jackman as Blackbeard
- Rooney Mara as Tiger Lily
- Adeel Akhtar as Sam "Smee" Smiegel
- Kathy Burke as Mother Barnabas
- Nonso Anozie as Bishop
- Amanda Seyfried as Mary
- Jack Charles as Chief Great Little Panther
- Lewis MacDougall as Nibs
- Bronson Webb as Steps
- Na Tae-joo as Kwahu
- Cara Delevingne as the mermaids

== Production ==
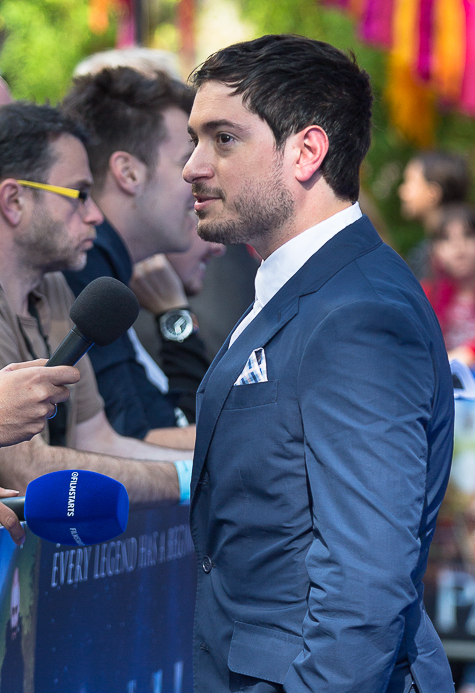
Jason Fuchs at the film's premiere

The script for the film was listed on Hollywood's 2013 Black List. In January 2014, Garrett Hedlund was cast as a younger version of Captain Hook. On January 24, 2014, Jackman was officially cast as the pirate Blackbeard. In February, a casting call was issued for the role of Peter Pan, which went to newcomer Levi Miller in March. In April 2014, Amanda Seyfried was cast. In August 2014, British model Cara Delevingne was chosen to play a mermaid.

Rooney Mara was cast as Tiger Lily. Also considered for the role of Tiger Lily were actresses Lupita Nyong'o and Adèle Exarchopoulos. During the film's casting, an article in TheWrap stated that director Joe Wright was trying to create a "very international and multi-racial" world. However, most of the main characters in the film (including the four lead actors) are white.

Principal photography officially began on April 28, 2014. Many natural scenes in the film were from Son Doong Cave, Phong Nha-Kẻ Bàng National Park, and Ninh Bình Province in Vietnam, shot with the help of Bangkok-based Indochina Productions.

== Soundtrack ==
The film's soundtrack was released in 2015. It was composed by John Powell, and additional music by Anthony Willis, Batu Sener, Paul Mounsey. Dario Marianelli, a frequent collaborator with Wright, had composed a score for the film, but Warner Bros. later replaced him with Powell after test screenings. Lily Allen wrote two original songs for the movie.

Track list

- "Smells Like Teen Spirit" – Hugh Jackman and Cast
- "Blitzkrieg Bop" – Hugh Jackman and Cast
- "Short Change Hero" – Capitol Children's Choir & Metro Voices
- "Something's Not Right" – Lily Allen
- "Little Soldier" – Lily Allen
- "Irish Blessing" – African Children's Choir

The theme song for the Japanese release is "Eien no Motto Mate Made" by Seiko Matsuda.

== Release ==
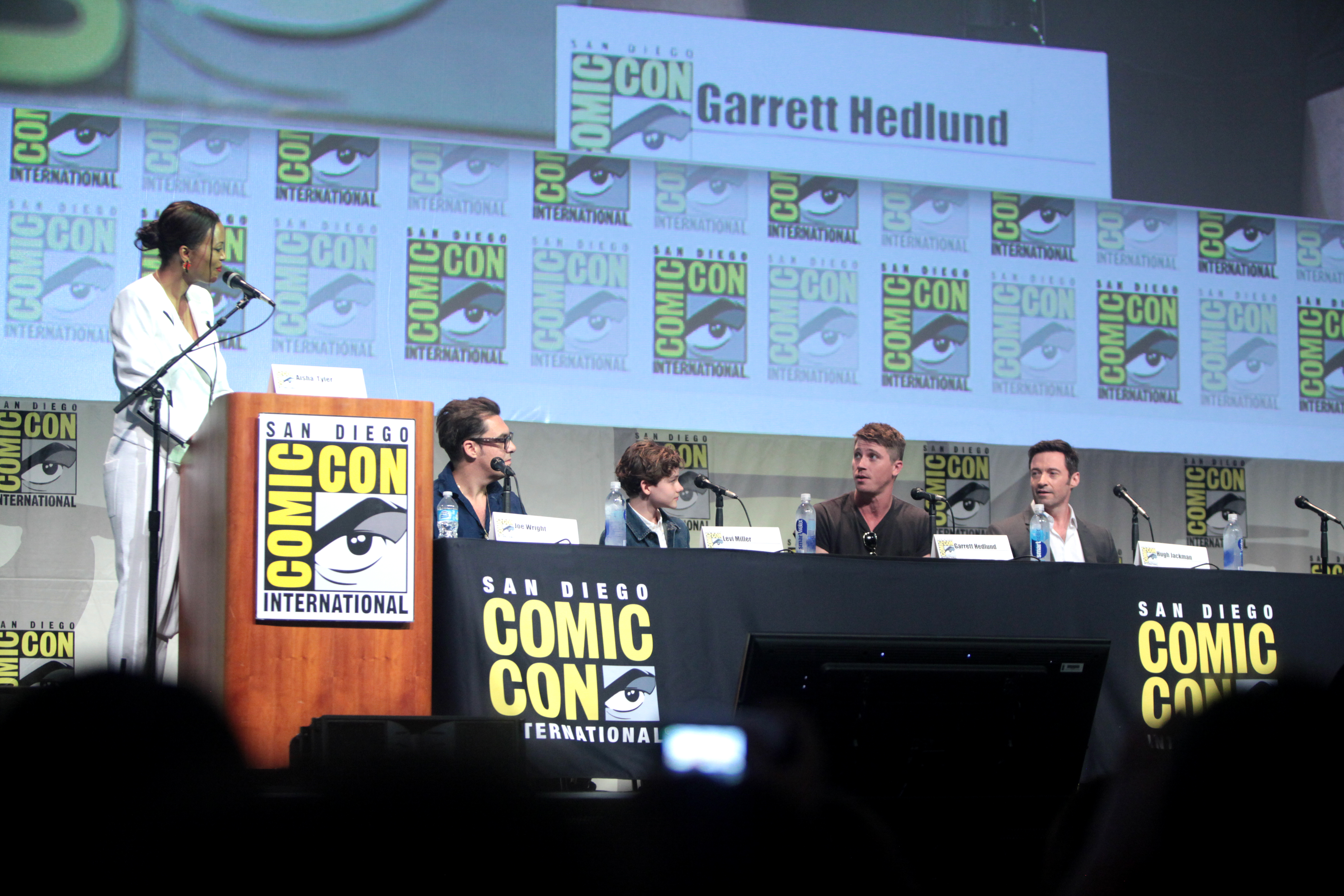
The cast and crew of Pan at the 2015 San Diego Comic-Con to promote the film

On December 12, 2013, Warner Bros. set for a June 26, 2015 release, with Joe Wright as director. The release was pushed back several times including to July 17, 2015, and July 24, 2015, and the studio eventually decided on October 9, 2015, in part to avoid box office competition from summer blockbusters such as Ant-Man and Mission: Impossible – Rogue Nation.

The new release date also gave the producers more time to work on editing and visual effects during post-production. The film was first released in Australia, on September 25, 2015. It was then released in key markets two weeks later, including Germany, Russia, Korea, and Brazil, on October 8. That was followed by Mexico and Spain the next day.

The film opened in the United Kingdom on October 16, 2015, and France on October 21, 2015, followed by China on October 22, 2015, Japan on October 31, 2015, and Italy on November 12, 2015.

Pan was originally planned for an IMAX release, as evident in early posters, trailers, and press, but was cancelled and only received non-IMAX presentations.

=== Home media ===
Pan was released on DVD, Blu-ray, and Blu-ray 3D on December 22, 2015, by Warner Home Video. Pan was one of the first Ultra HD Blu-rays, released on March 1, 2016.

== Reception ==
=== Critical response ===
On Rotten Tomatoes, the film has an approval rating of 27% based on 199 reviews and an average rating of 4.60/10. The site's critical consensus reads, "Pan finds a few bursts of magic in its prequel treatment of classic characters, though not enough to offset the rushed plot and shrill, CGI-fueled action." On Metacritic, the film has a score of 36 out of 100 based on 35 critics, indicating "generally unfavorable reviews". Audiences polled by CinemaScore gave the film an average grade of "B+" on an A+ to F scale, while PostTrak reported filmgoers gave it a 78% overall positive score.

A. O. Scott of The New York Times called the action scenes "murky and chaotic" and stated, "The dominant emotion in Pan is the desperation of the filmmakers, who frantically try to pander to a young audience they don’t seem to respect, understand or trust." The main characters lacked chemistry and depth according to Todd McCarthy of The Hollywood Reporter, who added that with the exception of Levi Miller's Pan, "the characters don't reasonably comport with one's pre-existing images of them". He also called a good portion of the film "a seriously extended chase that possesses hefty CGI-propelled dynamics but absolutely no suspense and a very limited sense of fun". Andrew Barker of Variety praised the film's technical achievements and action sequences but found it depressing overall: "Pan swaps puckish mischief and innocence for doses of Steampunk design, anachronistic music, a stock "chosen one" narrative and themes of child labor, warfare and unsustainable mineral mining exchanges".

In a more positive review, Bill Zwecker of Chicago Sun-Times gave the film three out of four stars, calling Levi Miller "a truly wonderful cinematic discovery" and praising the film's "thrilling action sequences, vivid costumes and well-executed special effects".

While promoting the film Darkest Hour in 2017, Wright said he almost quit directing and considered retirement following the box office failure of Pan: "I had just made this $100 million flop. It was a dark, difficult time. I didn’t know if I was going to make any more movies, I didn’t know that I wanted to make movies anymore, to be honest."

==== Cast ====
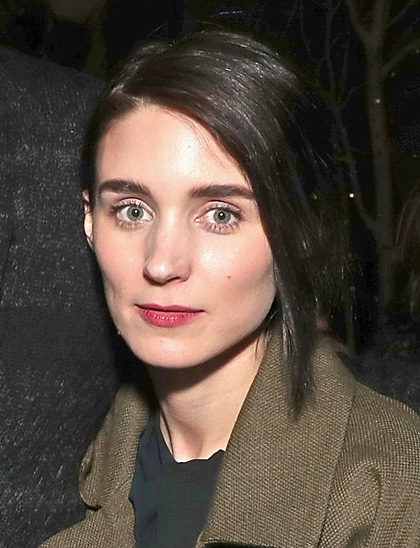
The casting of actress Rooney Mara as Native American character Tiger Lily resulted in claims of whitewashing.

Mara's casting as Tiger Lily created accusations of whitewashing, due to her being of European ancestry while Tiger Lily is Native American. One critic stated that there are "not a lot of mainstream roles out there for Native actresses." A petition was created in response to the casting to urge Warner Bros. studios to stop casting white actors in roles for people of color. Previous portrayals of the Piccaninny tribe in Peter Pan had been criticized as racist. Critics of the casting in Pan suggested that Warner Bros. may have wanted to avoid repeating the alleged racism of previous Peter Pan stories by altering the ethnicity of the Piccaninnies rather than stereotypically portraying the source material.

In a February 2016 interview, Mara expressed regret for playing Tiger Lily in Pan saying: "I really hate, hate, hate that I am on that side of the whitewashing conversation. I really do. I don't ever want to be on that side of it again. I can understand why people were upset and frustrated....Do I think all of the four main people in the film should have been white with blonde hair and blue eyes? No. I think there should have been some diversity somewhere."

=== Box office ===
Pan was financially unsuccessful. It grossed $35.1 million in North America and $116.4 million in other territories, for a worldwide total of $151.5 million. In comparison, its production budget was reported to be $150 million, and the total spent on marketing was estimated at $100–125 million.

In the United States and Canada, the film grossed $5.2 million on its opening day. In its opening weekend, the film grossed $15.3 million, below the studio's $20 million projection, and finished third at the box office. Several factors have been attributed to the financial failure of Pan. Forbes blogger Scott Mendelson attributed this to the absence of notable movie stars. Despite the presence of Jackman, "like any number of would-be big stars who are best known for a certain franchise, his opening weekend strength dips when he's not playing his trademark character." Outside of the X-Men films, his biggest openings are Van Helsing ($51 million) and the $27 million debuts of Real Steel and Les Misérables. Variety described the departure of the film in tone and writings that made earlier Peter Pan stories and films a success, from Jackman's role as Blackbeard to the inclusion of contemporary pop songs from Nirvana and the Ramones which is peculiar for a children's film adaptation. "Without the Disney seal of approval, audiences are a bit wary of these fairy tale adaptations," said Jeff Bock, a box office analyst with Exhibitor Relations. He added, "It veered off the Peter Pan path quite extensively and it was just too far left of center for a generation that grew up with Hook and sees that as the definitive account." Warner Bros. declined to discuss Pan's box office results.

Pan also struggled internationally, grossing $20.4 million on its opening weekend from 54 markets from over 11,000 screens. 3D comprised 85% of the opening gross. The film was released in Australia on September 24, 2015, to take advantage of the prime September school holidays, where it grossed $1.5 million in its opening weekend. Elsewhere, it opened in the U.K. with $4.1 million, and No. 1 in Mexico ($2.9 million), Brazil ($1.8 million), Indonesia, Malaysia and Thailand and No. 2 in Russia and the CIS with $2 million (behind The Martian), Spain with $1.7 million (behind Regression), Hong Kong, Singapore and the Philippines.

The Hollywood Reporter estimated that the film cost $275 million to produce and market worldwide—while The New York Times reported at least $250 million—and noted that the financial losses by Warner Bros. could finish anywhere between $130 million and $150 million. The site suggested that if the film overperformed in China—the world's second largest movie market—the losses could have been lower. Opening in China on October 22, 2015, it failed to meet expectations. Based on its production cost and factoring in the percentage of ticket sales kept by theater owners, analysts estimated that Pan needed to take in at least $400–500 million worldwide to break even. The financial loss incurred by Pan puts it alongside Tomorrowland and Jupiter Ascending as one of the biggest box office failures of 2015.

=== Accolades ===
Year	Award	Category	Nominee	Result
2015	Jury Award	Best 3D Film	John Mathieson; Seamus McGarvey	Nominated
2015	AACTA Award	Best Visual Effects or Animation	Chas Jarrett; Daniel Barrow; Mark Holt; Marc Varisco; Alana Newell	Nominated
2016	Ivor Novello Award	Best Original Film Score	John Powell	Nominated
2016	Golden Raspberry Awards	Worst Supporting Actress	Rooney Mara	Nominated
2016	Golden Raspberry Awards	Worst Supporting Actress	Amanda Seyfried	Nominated
2016	Young Artist Award	Best Performance in a Feature Film - Leading Young Actor (11 - 13)	Levi Miller	Nominated
2016	Young Entertainer Award	Best Leading Young Actor- Feature Film	Levi Miller	Nominated

== See also ==
- List of biggest box-office bombs
- Whitewashing in film
