= Lisa Flanagan =

Australian actress

- Born: Australia
- Occupation: Actress

Lisa Flanagan is an Aboriginal Australian actress, known for her roles on stage and in television and film.

== Career ==
Flanagan made her film debut in 2002 sports drama Australian Rules, opposite Nathan Phillips and Luke Carroll. She also appeared in 2005 drama film Look Both Ways, as part of the ensemble cast.

On television, Flanagan has appeared in children's comedy-drama series Double Trouble and indigenous drama series Redfern Now. More recently, she had a role in ABC political drama series Total Control, starring Deborah Mailman and Rachel Griffiths.

Flanagan has also performed for the stage, with roles in Wesley Enoch's The Sapphires and The 7 Stages of Grieving several times.

== Filmography ==
=== Film ===
Year	Title	Role	Notes
2002	Australian Rules	Clarence	
2002	Black and White	Girl at Cinema	
2002	Free		Short film
2004	Turn Around		Short film
2004	Queen of Hearts		
2005	Look Both Ways	Anna	
2006	Opal Dream (aka Pobby and Dingan)	Ms Banamooka	
2007	Spike Up	Raving Woman	Short film
2007	Hush	Jo	TV film
2007	September	Leena Parker	
2009	Rivals	Maya Davis	
2010	Double Trouble	Freda	
2015	Strangerland	Coreen	
2015	Redfern Now: Promise Me	Allie	TV film
2015	Dawn	Shop Keeper	
2016	Home and Away: Revenge	Amy Peters	TV film
2017	Brown Lips	Dot	Short film
2022	We Are Still Here	Katherine	

=== Television ===
Year	Title	Role	Notes
2003	All Saints	Chloe 'Boo' Hanson	5 episodes
2007	East West 101	Sarah King	Episode: "Death at the Station"
2008	Double Trouble	Freda	13 episodes
2009	Dirt Game	Nadia	Episode: "Boab Dreaming"
2010	City Homicide	Grace Barlow	Episode: "Ties That Bind"
2012–2013	Redfern Now	Allie	2 episodes
2014	The Gods of Wheat Street	Libby Lavelle	6 episodes
2014	The Code	Eadie Smith	4 episodes
2015	Ready for This	Rose Preston	Episode: "Back on Track"
2015–2019	Glitch	Kath	10 episodes
2017	Cleverman	Harah	3 episodes
2017	Kiki and Kitty	Nan's Kitty	2 episodes
2017	Aussie Rangers	Carol	
2018	Wrong Kind of Black	Mum	3 episodes
2019–2024	Total Control	Faye Stanley	9 episodes
2021	Home and Away	Amy Peters	6 episodes
2022	Mystery Road: Origin	Catherine	6 episodes
2022	Aftertaste	Tammy	1 episode

== Stage ==
Year	Title	Role	Notes	Ref.
2002	My Girragundji		Australian tour with Canute Productions	
2003–2004	The Sapphires	Kay	MTC / Belvoir, Sydney	
2007	Parramatta Girls	Kerry	Belvoir, Sydney	
2007	The Eyes of Marege	Dhalawal	Dunstan Playhouse, Adelaide, Sydney Opera House	
2008; 2010	The 7 Stages of Grieving	One-woman show	STCSA, QTC, STC	
2014; 2018	Brothers Wreck	Aunty Petra	Malthouse Theatre, Melbourne with STCSA	
