= Warwick Senior High School =

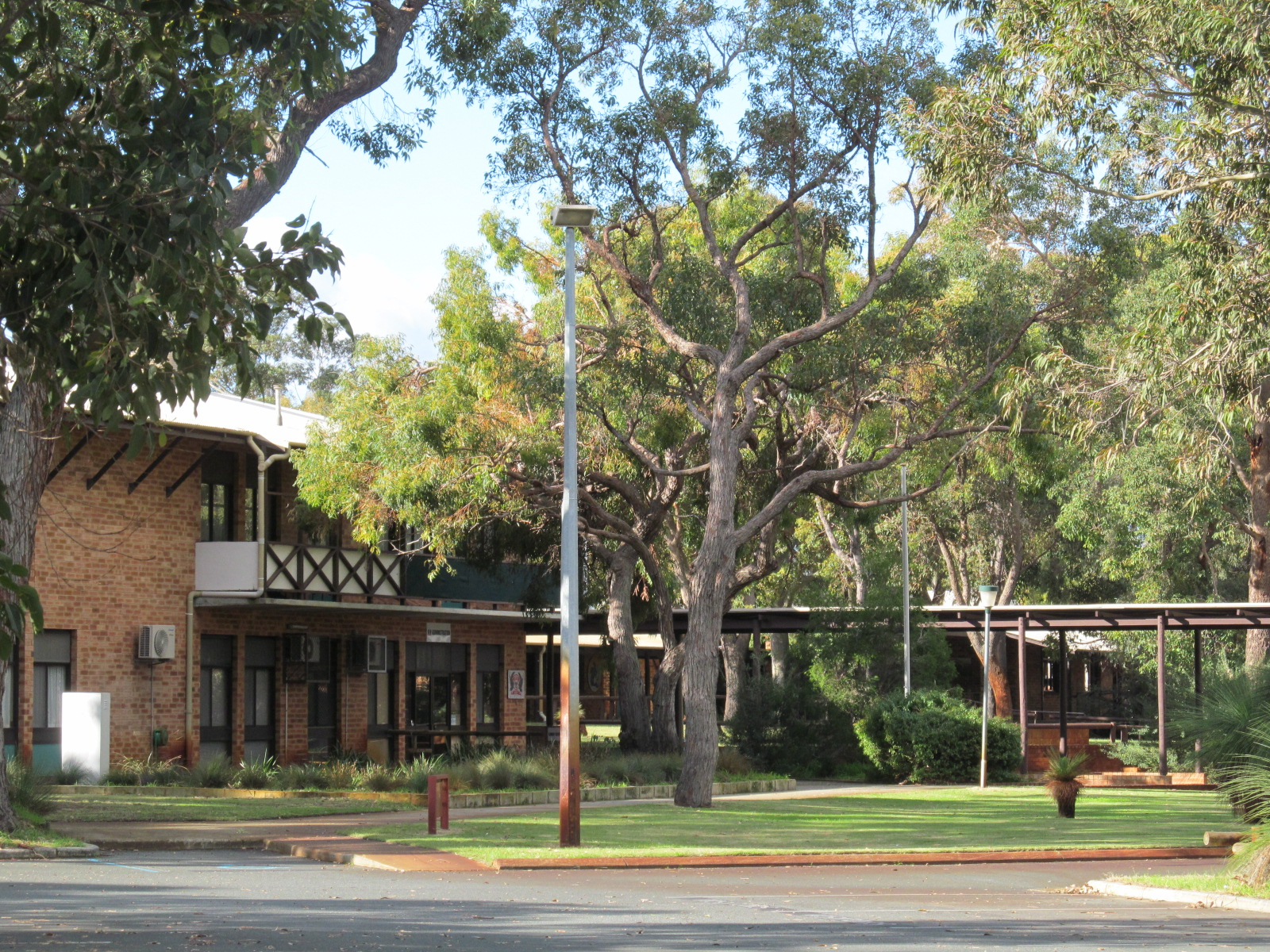
- The school's buildings and grounds, pictured in 2012

Location
- Warwick, Perth, Western Australia; Australia; 31°50′16″S 115°48′57″E

Information
- Type: Public co-educational high day school
- Motto: Aspire – Learn – Grow
- Established: 1981; 45 years ago
- Educational authority: WA Department of Education
- Principal: Lesley Wintle
- Enrolment: 811
- Campus type: Suburban
- Colours: Red, white, navy blue
- Website: www.warwickshs.wa.edu.au

Warwick Senior High School is a public co-educational high day school, located in Warwick, a northern suburb of Perth, Western Australia. Founded in 1981, the school provides education to approximately 800 students from Year 7 to Year 12.

The school has a renowned specialist program for Australian rules football.

In 2018, the school achieved its highest median ATAR (75.35) in 15 years.

== Notable alumni ==
- Melissa George – actress
- Cody Grace – Australian Canadian football player
- Mark Hutchings – Australian rules footballer

== See also ==
- List of schools in the Perth metropolitan area
