= Aaron L. McGrath =

Australian actor

Aaron Luke McGrath
- Born: 1996 (29 years old); New South Wales
- Occupation: Actor
- Children: 1

Aaron McGrath is an Aboriginal Australian television and film actor known for various roles including Redfern Now, The Code, Glitch, Black Comedy, Jasper Jones and Queen of Oz.

In 2024 McGrath joined the cast of Return to Paradise (a spin-off of Death in Paradise). He returned for series two of Return to Paradise.

== Filmography ==
=== Film ===
Year	Title	Role	Notes
2013	Destiny in the Dirt	Young Dylan	Short
2013	Around the Block	Joseph	
2015	The Bus Stop	Aaron	Short
2016	Miro	Tooey	Short
2017	Jasper Jones	Jasper Jones	
2017	Brown Lips	Des	Short

=== Television ===
Year	Title	Role	Notes	Ref
2011	My Place	Garadi	"Before Time: Bunda"	
2012–13	Redfern Now	Joel Shields	"Stand Up", "Pokies"	
2014	The Gods of Wheat Street	Young Odin Freeburn	4 episodes	
2014	The Code	Clarence Boyd	Recurring role	
2015	The Doctor Blake Mysteries	Winston Cummings	"This Time and This Place"	
2015–19	Glitch	Beau Cooper	Main role	
2015	Ready for This	Levi Mackay	Main role	
2016	Doctor Doctor	Jai	"1.5"	
2018	Mystery Road	Marley Thompson	6 episodes	
2018	Wrong Kind of Black	Paul Pryor	3 episodes	
2019	KGB	Jai	5 episodes	
2021	Preppers	Jayden	6 episodes	
2021	Back to the Rafters	Paddo Steel	6 episodes	
2023	Queen of Oz	Marc Kemarre	6 episodes	
2023	Gold Diggers	Albert	7 episodes	
2024–present	Return to Paradise	Felix Williamson	18 episodes	

== Theatre ==
Year	Title	Role	Notes	Ref
2024	Big Name No Blanket		Roslyn Packer Theatre	
2020	Black Cockatoo	Johnny	Ensemble Theatre	
