= Levi Miller =

Australian actor and model

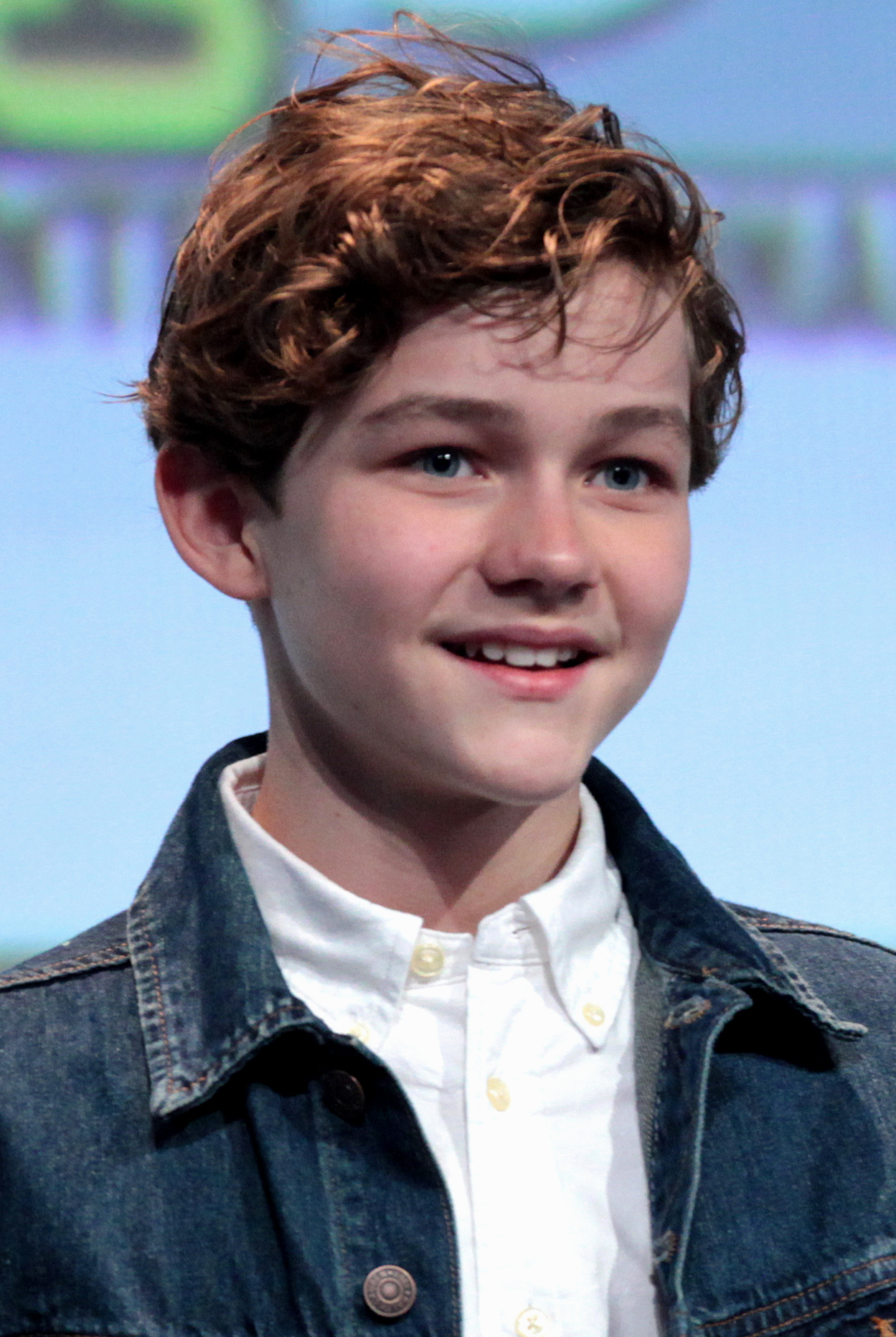
- Miller at the 2015 San Diego Comic-Con
- Born: Levi Zane Miller; 30 September 2002 (age 24); Brisbane, Queensland, Australia
- Occupations: Actor; model
- Years active: 2010–present
- Known for: Pan

Levi Zane Miller (born 30 September 2002) is an Australian actor and model. He is known for playing Peter Pan in Pan (2015), Luke in Better Watch Out (2016), and Calvin in A Wrinkle in Time (2018).

== Early life ==
Miller was born in Brisbane, Queensland, Australia. At the age of 5 or 6 he entered and won a drama competition with a Peter Pan monologue. He appeared in several Australian television commercials.

== Career ==
Miller appeared in the film A Heartbeat Away (2012) and in short films such as Akiva (2010) and Great Adventures (2012). He was selected by the film's director Joe Wright for the role of Peter Pan in Pan. He appeared in Red Dog: True Blue where he played Mick.

In 2015, he was named ambassador for Polo, the Ralph Lauren kids' fall campaign.

In 2016, Miller starred as Luke in the psychological horror Christmas-themed film Better Watch Out where the young Australian actor's performance was highly regarded by film critics. He played Charlie Bucktin in the film adaptation of the Australian novel Jasper Jones.

In 2018, he played Calvin O'Keefe in the American fantasy adventure A Wrinkle in Time. The next year, he played Leo in the film American Exit (2019). Miller also played Bejamin Lane in the sports drama film Streamline (2021). In 2024, Miller appeared in the superhero film Kraven the Hunter. He is set to star in the film Shiver and the TV series Bloodaxe.

== Filmography ==
=== Film ===
Key
†	Denotes films that have not yet been released

Year	Film	Role	Notes
2011	A Heartbeat Away	Boy fishing	
2015	Pan	Peter Pan	
2016	Better Watch Out	Luke Lerner	
2016	Red Dog: True Blue	Mick	
2017	Jasper Jones	Charlie Bucktin	
2018	A Wrinkle in Time	Calvin O'Keefe	
2019	American Exit	Leo	
2021	Streamline	Benjamin Lane	
2024	Before Dawn	Jim Collins	
2024	Kraven the Hunter	Young Sergei Kravinoff / Kraven the Hunter	
TBA	Shiver †	Sam Roth	Post-production
TBA	Beach Boys †	TBA	

=== Television ===
Year	Title	Role	Episodes
2011	Terra Nova	General Philbrick (child)	"Vs."
2015	Supergirl	Carter Grant	Season 1, episode 4: "How Does She Do It?"
TBA	Bloodaxe †	Haakon the Good	

== Awards and nominations ==
Year	Award	Category	Work	Result
2016	Monster Fest	Best Performance in a Feature Film (Male)	Better Watch Out	Won
2016	Young Artist Award	Best Performance in a Feature Film – Leading Young Actor (11–13)	Pan	Nominated
2016	Young Entertainer Award	Best Leading Young Actor – Feature Film	Pan	Nominated
2017	FrightFest	Best Actor	Better Watch Out	Won
2018	Film Critics Circle of Australia Awards	Best Actor	Jasper Jones	Nominated
