= Wrong Kind of Black =

Australian web and TV series

Wrong Kind of Black, originally titled Maybe Today, is an Australian four-part comedy drama series originally released as a telemovie and web series in 2018, and on streaming services in 2020. It was created, written and narrated by the Aboriginal Australian author, storyteller, and inaugural Australian Children's Laureate (2012–2013), Boori Monty Pryor, on whose life it is based. It is directed by Catriona McKenzie.

== Synopsis ==
Described as a comedy drama, the series is based on Pryor's life and experiences growing up in northern Melbourne in the 1960s and 1970s, far away both literally and figuratively from his childhood on Palm Island.

Pryor later became an author, storyteller, and was the inaugural Australian Children's Laureate from 2012 to 2013.

== Cast and characters ==
Clarence John Ryan plays the role of Pryor as a young man, veteran Indigenous actor Tom E. Lewis plays Pryor's father, while Lisa Flanagan plays his mother. The young Boori and his brother Paul are played by Nihil Yasserie and Christopher Ketchup, who have no training as actors.

Damian Walshe-Howling, Jacek Koman, Colin Lane, Toby Truslove and many others appear in Episode 1.

== Production ==
The series was originally titled Maybe Today, with the project funded by Screen Australia and ABC Television under its have "Long Story Short" initiative in 2016, with additional funding from Screen Queensland and Film Victoria.

It is directed by Catriona McKenzie, produced by Melanie Brunt, Kelly West and Andrea Denholm, and made by Princess Pictures. It was co-written by Pryor and Nick Musgrove, and Pryor narrates the story. The total length is an hour.

Filming was done in Townsville and Melbourne, with only a week in each location.

== Themes ==
There is comedy, drama, tragedy, music and 1970s fashion and disco life in the film, but its underlying theme is political, showing the extent of overt racism in Australia at the time.

== Release ==
The Wrong Kind of Black was first shown to a live audience as part of "Series Mania Melbourne" at the Australian Centre for the Moving Image (ACMI) on 19 July 2018, premiered on 5 August on ABC iview as a four-part series, and was shown as a one-hour telemovie on ABC Television that same evening.

The series was picked up on 6 November 2020 by Netflix for international distribution.

It is also archived on and available from National Film and Sound Archive, in one of its curated collections.

== Episode list ==
All episodes were released on 5 August 2020, and were named as follows:

1. Hedging Your Bets
2. Lover Not A Fighter
3. Trouble Makers
4. Story Keeper

== Reception ==
The series received accolades in The Guardian for its sense of humour, handling of issues surrounding racial violence, and scripting.

It was nominated for an International Emmy Award for Best Short Form Series, and won the Grand Jury Award at the 2019 Melbourne Web Series Festival.
