= Dymocks =

Australian bookstore chain

Dymocks Booksellers
- Type: Private
- Industry: Retailing
- Founded: 1879
- Founder: William Dymock
- Headquarters: Sydney
- Area served: Australia
- Products: Books, DVDs and ebooks
- Website: www.dymocks.com.au

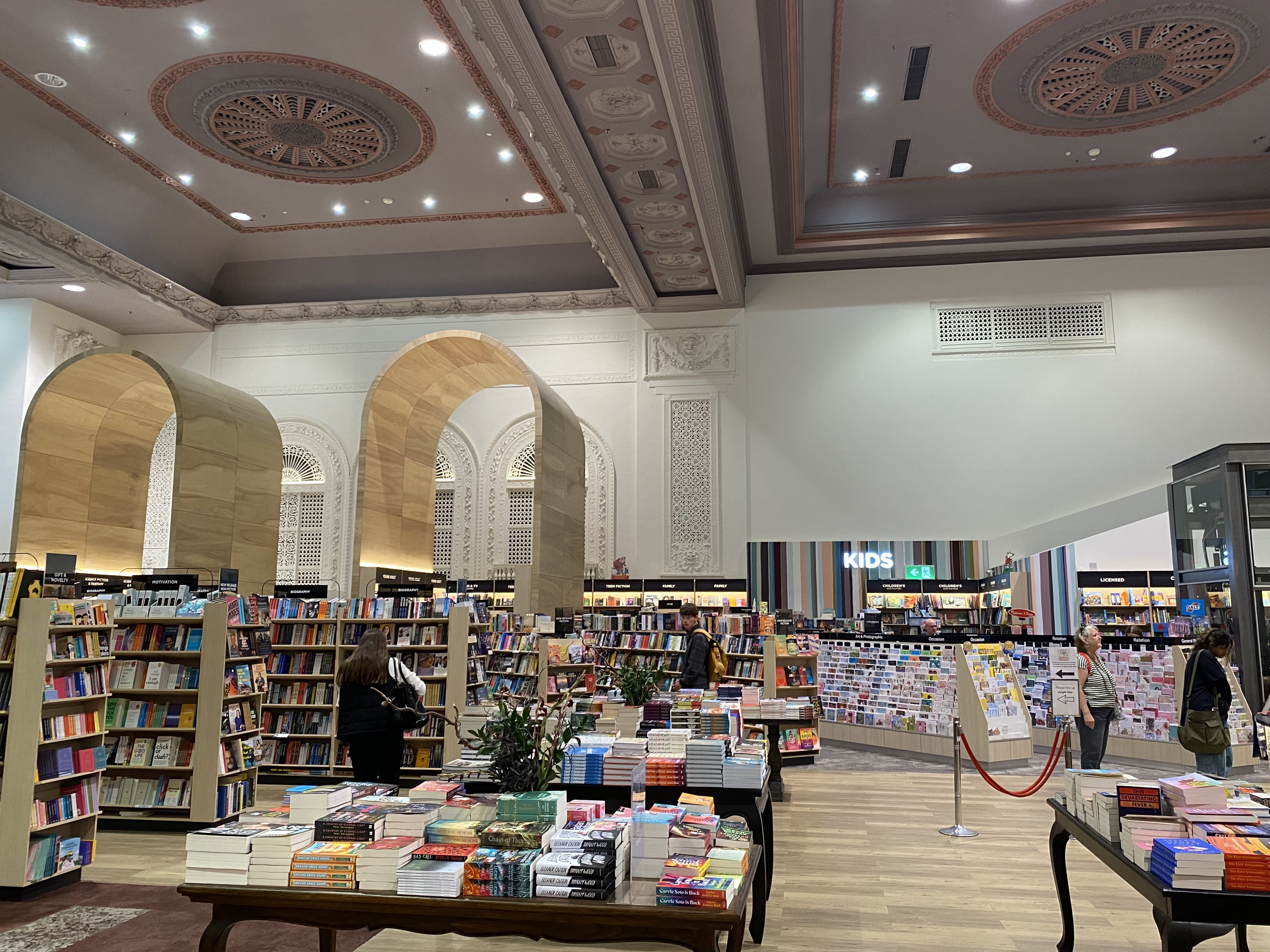
Dymocks bookstore, Adelaide

Dymocks Booksellers is a privately-owned Australian bookstore chain that also retails CDs, DVDs, Blu-ray discs, e-books and related merchandise. As of June 2022, the company has about 50 stores in Australia.

== History ==
The first Dymocks bookstore was opened in Sydney by William Dymock in 1879, in Market Street. As his business grew over the years, he moved to larger premises at 428 George Street, traded as Dymock's Book Arcade, and eventually had a million books in stock. As he had died childless and unmarried, the business passed to his sister, Marjory, who was married to John Forsyth. Since then, the Forsyth family has managed Dymocks. In 1922, the Dymock family purchased the site of the old Royal Hotel in George Street, and built the historic, Art Deco landmark Dymocks building, completed in 1930. In 1986 the bookstore chain was established as a franchise chain, and has since opened stores in every mainland Australian state, and also internationally in New Zealand and Singapore.

=== 21st century ===
In addition to stocking music CDs, DVDs and other related items, Dymocks now has an online store launched in late 2006 in response to the increasing penetration into the Australian book market of online retailers such as Amazon.

Dymocks has a comprehensive multi-channel strategy including an international retail network of approximately 65 stores in Australia: an online website, loyalty program, regular catalogues and social media. Dymocks also runs an Australia-wide program, Dymocks Children's Charities (DCC), providing books to pre-primary and primary school age children.

Dymocks is the largest bookseller in Australia and currently holds close to 20% of the Australian book market.

In October 2011, Dymocks launched D Publishing, a self-publishing platform which allowed authors to print, publish and distribute their own books and ebooks. The venture was shut down in March 2013.

In September 2023, personal information of 1.24 million Dymocks customers were shared on the dark web after a cybersecurity breach.

== Outside Australia ==
=== New Zealand ===
The last Dymocks store in New Zealand closed down in September 2012 as they chose to exit that market.

=== Hong Kong ===
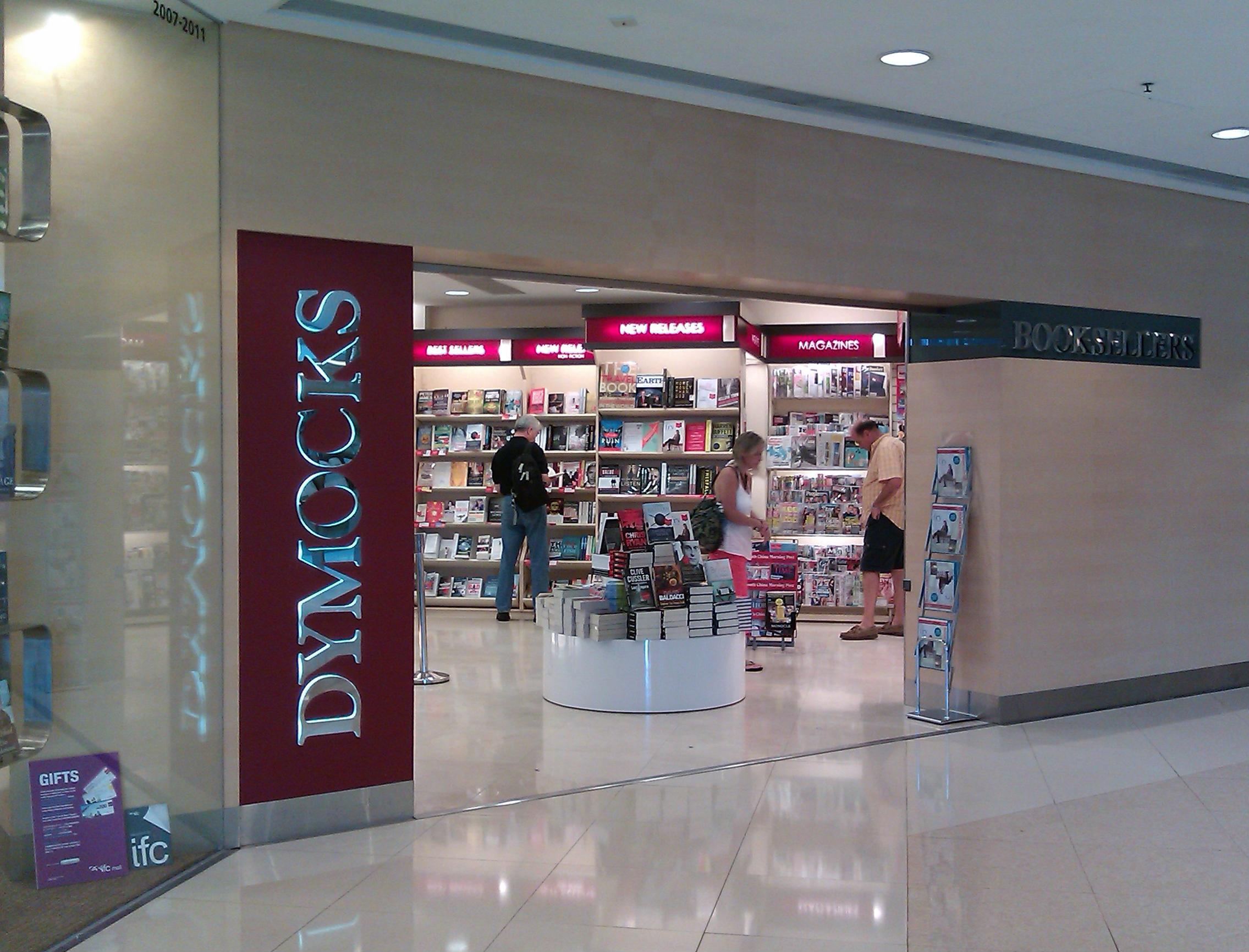
Dymocks in IFC Mall, Hong Kong

In 1999, Dymocks Booksellers entered into a joint venture with South China Morning Post (Holdings) to set up Dymocks Franchise Systems (China), in order to expand the Dymocks chain into Hong Kong. The first store with the Dymocks brand opened at the Star Ferry concourse in Central in 1999. Three Dymocks stores closed in 2012 in Hong Kong when their rental contracts expired.

It was announced in January 2015 that Dymocks would close its flagship IFC Mall store on 25 January, and that it would subsequently close its Hong Kong office. After the closure of the IFC Mall store, the number of Dymocks stores in Hong Kong would be brought down to five. The remaining stores operated independently using the Dymocks name before being rebranded individually.

== Book of the year ==
Each year Dymocks invites its booksellers to nominate "their favourite title that was published within the last year" and a single title is chosen as "Dymocks Book of the Year". A separate "Young Readers' Book of the Year" was also chosen in 2022 and 2023.

=== Winners ===
Dymocks Books of the Year
| Year | Author | Title | Ref |
|---|---|---|---|
| 2020 | Craig Silvey | Honeybee | |
| 2021 | Sarah Winman | Still Life | |
| 2022 | Bonnie Garmus | Lessons in Chemistry | |
| 2022: Young Readers | Craig Silvey | Runt | |
| 2023 | Rebecca Yarros | Fourth Wing | |
| 2023: Young Readers | Isaiah Firebrace | Come Together | |
| 2024 | Kaliane Bradley | The Ministry of Time | |

== Loyalty program ==
Dymocks has a loyalty program called 'Dymocks Booklover Rewards', originally launched in 2001, and relaunched in 2006.

== Other businesses ==
Dymocks Properties is the real estate arm of Dymocks. Its portfolio includes commercial buildings, farms and land.

In 2009, Dymocks acquired an 80% equity stake in the Australian owned and operated Healthy Habits sandwich bar franchise for an undisclosed sum. Healthy Habits was sold by Dymocks in June 2016 to Franchised Food Co.

In 2010, Dymocks acquired Victorian confectionery manufacturer Patons Macadamia. The company's products were sold in Dymocks stores. In 2015, Patons acquired Gourmet Nut Company. Dymocks sold Patons in 2020 to focus on its other businesses.

In 2015, Dymocks Holdings acquired Telegram Paper Goods. Founded in 2008, Telegram Paper Goods distributes designer stationery brands across Australia and New Zealand. Telegram is best known for its stationery store, Milligram (formerly Notemaker.com.au), that sells eclectic and designer stationery, cards, wrap, diaries, journals, and fine writing instruments. Telegram acquired homeware and body care brand Addition Studio in February 2023.

In 2018, Dymocks launched an education and tutoring business called Potentia. The business was rebranded Dymocks Tutoring in 2020.

== See also ==
- List of oldest companies in Australia
