= QBD Books =

Australian book store chain

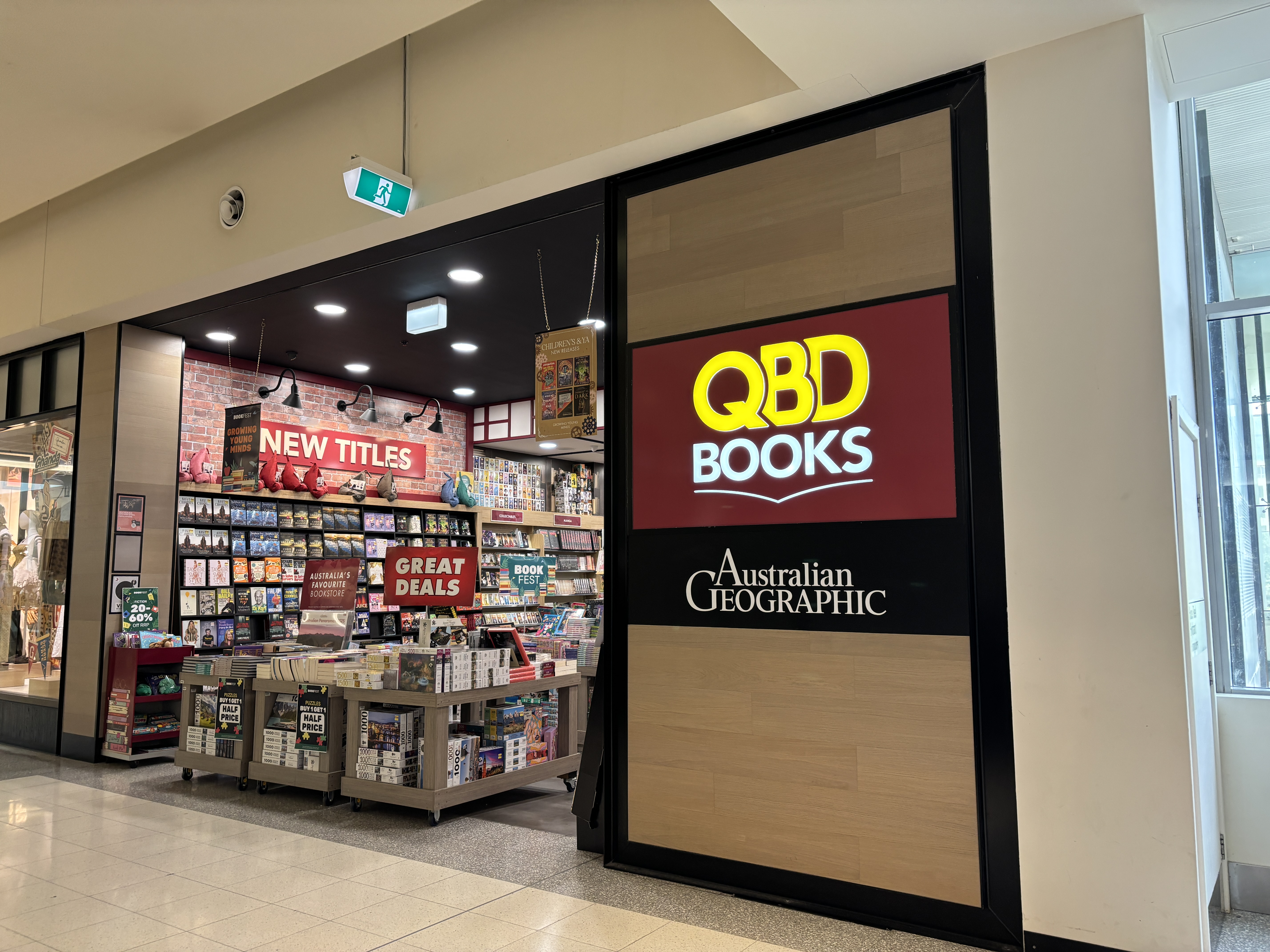
- A QBD Books store in Canberra
- Founded: 1890s
- Headquarters: Richlands
- Parent: Cover Syndicate Pty Ltd
- Website: qbd.com.au

QBD Books, formerly Queensland Book Depot and "QBD" The Bookshop!, is an Australian book retail chain. The majority of its stores are located in the states of Queensland and New South Wales. QBD Books is the largest Australian-owned and operated book retailer in Australia, with over 91 stores across the country.

== History ==
As at 2025, the business is over 150 years old.

Wesleyan minister Isaac Harding arrived in Brisbane in the 1860s and saw the need for good books, so he imported and sold books through his parsonage on Wickham Terrace and at the chemist store in Edward Street operated by William Steele. The operation was known as the Religious Tract and Book Depot. In 1875, a Wesleyan minister Rev Frederick Thomas Brentnall organised a loan from the Wesleyan Church to establish a dedicated shop in Queen Street owned and operated by the church, known as the Queensland Wesleyan Book Depot.

In 1902, following the amalgamation of the various Methodist churches in Queensland, the Wesleyan Book Depot was renamed the Methodist Book Depot. In 1919, the church changed the bookshop's name to be Queensland Book Depot. In 1977, the amalgamation of the Methodist Church into the newly created Uniting Church in Australia transferred the Queensland Book Depot to the Uniting Church. However, over the years, the consumer market changed and the business was sold to the Robinson family in 1991. The Robinson family sold the business in October 2016 to a consortium of private equity investors.

== See also ==
- List of oldest companies in Australia
