= Shari Sebbens =

Australian actress and theatre director (born 1985)

- Born: 22 April 1985 (age 41); Darwin, Northern Territory Australia
- Education: Darwin High School (2001); Western Australian Academy of Performing Arts; National Institute of Dramatic Art (BFA) (2009)
- Occupation: Actress
- Years active: 2010–present
- Known for: The Sapphires (2012); Redfern Now (2012)
- Family: Mitch Torres (cousin)

Shari Sebbens is an Aboriginal Australian actress and stage director, known for her debut film role in The Sapphires (2012), as well as many stage and television performances.

== Early life and education ==
Sebbens, one of six children, was born and raised in Darwin, Northern Territory, Australia. Her father is a former long-distance coach driver from Sydney of English descent and her mother, Annarella, an Aboriginal education worker from Broome, Western Australia is of Jabirr Jabirr and Bardi heritage. Sebbens refers to Australian music composer and playwright Jimmy Chi as her uncle, although they are not related by blood. She is the cousin of writer and film director Mitch Torres.

As a child, Sebbens wanted to become a palaeontologist or an astronaut but at the age of thirteen she saw Indigenous actress (and future The Sapphires co-star) Deborah Mailman in the film Radiance (1998) and was inspired to pursue acting.

Sebbens graduated from Darwin High School in 2001 and after two and a half years at Nhulunbuy, at age 19, was chosen to participate in "SPARK", a theatre mentorship programme established by the Australia Council for the Arts. At 20 she was accepted into the Western Australian Academy of Performing Arts (WAAPA) where she completed a one-year course in Aboriginal Theatre. Upon completing her studies at WAAPA, Sebbens successfully auditioned for a place at the National Institute of Dramatic Art (NIDA) in Sydney, where she studied acting full-time for three years, graduating in 2009.

== Acting and directing ==
=== Screen ===
Sebbens played Anna in a short film called Violet in 2010. By May 2012, she landed a role in Redfern Now, a television series about "six inner city households whose lives are changed by a seemingly insignificant incident".

Sebbens secured a role in The Sapphires (2012), a film based on the stage show of the same name, written by Tony Briggs. It was directed by Wayne Blair and also starred Deborah Mailman, Jessica Mauboy, and Miranda Tapsell (who also co-wrote the script). Sebbens played the role of Kay McCrae, one of four Indigenous Australian singers "who travel from a mission in Victoria to Vietnam to sing for American troops". The cast attended the film's premiere at the 65th Annual Cannes Film Festival in Cannes, France, on 20 May 2012.

In 2024, Sebbens joined the cast for the Australian adaptation of The Office, playing Greta King, a sales representative.

In 2026, Sebbens was announced for the second series of Deadloch.

=== Theatre ===
In 2012 Sebbens played Miri Smith and Currah in A Hoax with Griffin Theatre Company; in 2014, Dawn in Lobby Hero at Tap Gallery; and in 2015, Mae in Radiance at Belvoir. In 2017, she played Charlotte Gibbons in STC’s production of Nakkiah Lui's play Black is the New White in Sydney (with Miranda Tapsell stepping into her role when the show toured to Adelaide).

In 2019 she took the role of Julia Hersey in a production of Our Town by Black Swan State Theatre Company in Perth, and in the same year played matriarchal character Carina in Meyne Wyatt's City of Gold, her last role on stage for at least another three years, in a play she later directed, in 2021.

In 2021 Sebbens was appointed as one of STC's resident directors. She was assistant director to Wesley Enoch on STC's production of Appropriate in 2021. That same year, she directed STC's touring production of Enoch's The 7 Stages of Grieving, featuring Elaine Crombie, after it was rescheduled from 2020, due to COVID-19. It included a new epilogue that introduced a note of activism, with Crombie, Sebbens and assistant director Ian Michael calling for the audience to engage in "seven actions of healing".

Sebbens was dramaturg on STC's 2022 production of Shakespeare's The Tempest, starring Richard Roxburgh and directed by Kip Williams. In 2023 she directed productions by STC and the Griffin Theatre Company in Sydney, as well as Melbourne Theatre Company and Malthouse in Melbourne.

Sebbens is on the board of Back to Back Theatre.

== Other activities ==
Sebbens was a judge for the Patrick White Playwrights Award at STC in 2018.

After being appointed STC's resident director, she hosted the TV series The Whole Table, a co-production between STC and NITV, which aired in January–February 2021. Her co-panellists were playwright Wesley Enoch, actor/writer/director Nakkiah Lui and Rhoda Roberts, and guests included Taika Waititi, Miranda Tapsell, Adam Briggs, Meyne Wyatt, Yolanda Bonnell and Kwame Kwei-Armah.

== Awards and nominations ==
Year	Work	Award	Category	Result
2012	A Hoax	Sydney Theatre Award	Best Newcomer	Nominated
2013	Redfern Now	Logie Award	Most Outstanding New Talent	Won
2013	Redfern Now	Equity Ensemble Award	Outstanding Performance by an Ensemble in a Drama Series	Won
2019–2020:	Shari Sebbens	Richard Wherrett Fellow		Won
2020	The Heights	Equity Ensemble Award	Outstanding Performance by an Ensemble in a Drama Series	Won
2023	Fences	Sydney Theatre Award	Best Direction of a Mainstage Production	Won

== Filmography ==
=== Film ===
Year	Title	Role	Notes
2010	Violet	Anna	Short film
2012	The Sapphires	Kay McCrae	
2013	The Darkside	Naomi	
2014	You Wanna Order Pizza?	Cass	Short film
2015	Alone	Nina	Short film
2015	Silent Night	Carly	Short film
2016	OnO	Ollie	Short film
2016	Teenage Kicks	Annuska	
2017	Australia Day	Sonya Mackenzie	
2017	Puppets vs. People: Night of the Living Thread	Susie	Short film
2017	This Is Desmondo Ray!	Clementine Love	Short film
2017	Thor: Ragnarok	Asgardian Mother	
2019	Top End Wedding	Ronelle	
2022	Thor: Love and Thunder	Asgardian	
2024	The Moogai	Sarah	Short film (2020) precedes this feature film.

=== Television ===
Year	Title	Role	Notes
2012	Redfern Now	Julie	Episode: "Joy Ride"; Logie Award for Most Outstanding New Talent; Equity Award for Outstanding Performance by an Ensemble in a Drama Series
2014	The Gods of Wheat Street	Isolde Freeburn	6 episodes
2014	Soul Mates	Samus	2 episodes
2014, 2016	Black Comedy	Various	4 episodes
2015	8MMM Aboriginal Radio	Jessie	6 episodes
2018	Show Me the Movie!	Herself	Episode: "#1.3"
2018	A Chance Affair	Aviante	Episode: "Just Like Smoke"
2019, 2020	The Heights	Leonie Farrell	60 episodes
2021	The Whole Table	Host	3-part documentary series, with panel discussions
2024	The Office	Greta King	Main role
2024	Thou Shalt Not Steal	Tracey	6 episodes
2025	Top End Bub	Ronelle	1 episode, directed 4 episodes
2026	Deadloch	Miki Evans	TV series

== Theatre ==
=== As actor ===
Year	Title	Role	Theatre
2008	Measure for Measure	Mistress Overdone / Isabella	NIDA Parade Theatre, Sydney
2011	Wulamanayuwi and the Seven Pamanui		Tandanya Theatre, Adelaide
2012	A Hoax	Miri Smith / Currah	Roundhouse Theatre, Brisbane, Stables Theatre, Sydney with Griffin Theatre Company; Nominated – Sydney Theatre Award for Best Newcomer
2013	Return to Earth	Alice	Stables Theatre, Sydney with Griffin Independent
2014	Lobby Hero	Dawn	Tap Gallery, Sydney
2015	Radiance	Mae	Belvoir St Theatre, Sydney
2015	Battle of Waterloo	Cassie	Wharf Theatre, Sydney with STC
2015; 2017	The Bleeding Tree	Daughter	Stables Theatre, Sydney, Wharf Theatre, Sydney with STC & Griffin Theatre Company
2016	Bright World		Theatre Works, Melbourne
2017	An Octoroon	Zoe	Bille Brown Studio, Brisbane with QTC for Brisbane Festival
2017–2018	Black is the New White	Charlotte Gibbons	Wharf Theatre, Sydney, Playhouse, Brisbane, IMB Theatre, Wollongong, Roslyn Packer Theatre, Sydney, Riverside Theatres Parramatta with STC
2018	A Cheery Soul	Various roles	Sydney Opera House
2019	Our Town	Julia Hersey	State Theatre Centre Courtyard, Perth with Black Swan State Theatre Company
2019	City of Gold	Carina	Bille Brown Theatre, Brisbane, Stables Theatre, Sydney with Griffin Theatre Company & QTC

=== As writer / director ===
Year	Title	Role	Theatre
2020	Superheroes	Director	Seymour Centre, Sydney with Griffin Theatre Company
2020–2021	The 7 Stages of Grieving	Director	Roslyn Packer Theatre, Sydney, Space Theatre, Adelaide, Wharf Theatre, Sydney with STC
2021	Seven Methods of Killing Kylie Jenner	Director	Eternity Playhouse, Sydney with Darlinghurst Theatre Company & Green Door Theatre Company
2021	Appropriate	Assistant Director	Roslyn Packer Theatre, Sydney with STC
2022	City of Gold	Director	Wharf Theatre, Sydney with STC & Black Swan State Theatre Company
2022	All that Glitters is not Mould	Dramaturg	NIDA Parade Studio, Sydney
2022	The Tempest	Dramaturg	Roslyn Packer Theatre, Sydney with STC
2023	Is God Is	Co-Director	Southbank Theatre, Melbourne with MTC & STC
