= Elaine Crombie =

Indigenous Australian actress

- Born: South Australia
- Occupations: Actress, singer, writer
- Years active: 1999–present
- Children: 2
- Parent(s): Lillian Crombie and Sam Backo

Elaine Crombie is an Aboriginal Australian actress, known for her work on stage and television. She is also a singer, songwriter, comedian, writer and producer.

== Early life and education ==
Crombie is a Pitjantjatjara and Yankunytjatjara woman from South Australia. She and her brother were brought up by her mother's foster parents in Port Pirie, the Turners, after being given up at the age of six weeks by her mother, actor Lillian Crombie, who went to Sydney "to follow her dreams" in the performing arts. Lillian, along with her brother, had been one of the Stolen Generations.

During her teens Elaine (in her own words) "fell off the rails", and she left high school at the age of 16 to go to the University of Adelaide to attend the Centre for Aboriginal Studies in Music. She lived in Adelaide for two years before going to Brisbane, where she was met by her father, rugby league great Sam Backo, for the first time.

In Brisbane Crombie studied at the Aboriginal Centre for the Performing Arts for 18 months.

Crombie delivered the second annual lecture at National Institute of Dramatic Art for NAIDOC Week 2021.

== Career ==
Crombie's first break was when she auditioned successfully for Wesley Enoch's The Sunshine Club with the Queensland Theatre Company. The play toured regional Queensland, including Cairns, and did a season at the Playhouse in Brisbane in November 1999 followed by a run at the Sydney Opera House in January 2000. In 2003 she joined the tour to England to perform in the first Aboriginal-written play, The Cherry Pickers by Kevin Gilbert, with the Sydney Theatre Company.

Crombie spent a few years performing in Sydney and Brisbane, before taking a hiatus to raise her children.

One of Crombie's earliest roles on television was in 8MMM Aboriginal Radio, a comedy series about an Aboriginal radio station located in Alice Springs which screened on ABC Television in 2015. She played Kitty in Nakkiah Lui's 2017 comedy television series, Kiki and Kitty, made for ABC iview and also screened on ABC Comedy. She also appeared in many episodes of Black Comedy and played Bev in the drama series Top of the Lake.

She appeared in the feature film Top End Wedding (2019), alongside Miranda Tapsell. That same year, the short documentary film (in a series called Deadly Family Portraits) called Crombie Crew, focused on Elaine and her mother Lillian. The series of three films included one about Zaachariaha Fielding and his father, artist Robert Fielding, and another about dancers Taree and Caleena Sansbury.

In 2019, Crombie premiered her own show, Janet's Vagrant Love in the Spiegeltent at Adelaide Cabaret Festival, and two years later brought a pared-back version of the show to the Adelaide Fringe. A combination of personal songs and stories, she described the show as "Love, loss, childhood trauma & raising blak men".

She co-hosted the National Indigenous Music Awards 2020 in Darwin.

Crombie starred in a touring production of Wesley Enoch's The 7 Stages of Grieving, directed by Shari Sebbens for the Sydney Theatre Company. The staging was originally scheduled for 2020, but, interrupted by the COVID-19 pandemic in Australia, was postponed until mid-2021. It was staged in Sydney, Adelaide, and Canberra, with a new epilogue that introduces a note of activism, with Crombie, Sebbens and assistant director Ian Michael calling for the audience to engage in "seven actions of healing".

Her first performance in 2022 was in the Bangarra Dance Theatre's production, Wudjang: Not the Past, which premiered at the Sydney Festival in January before touring to Hobart and Adelaide as part of the Adelaide Festival. Also in 2022, Crombie directed Bungambrawartha, a stage production in Albury-Wodonga presented by HotHouse Theatre Company.

In February/March 2024, Crombie performed as Gindara in Baleen Moondjan, a work commissioned by the Adelaide Festival and created by former Bangarra Dance Theatre artistic director Stephen Page. It was performed on a huge stage in front of huge specially-constructed "whalebones" on the beach at Glenelg. The performance combined contemporary dance, storytelling, and songs in English, Jandai, and Gumbaynggirr/Yaegl languages.

On 21 October 2024, Crombie would reprise her role as Dana in the Top End Wedding sequel series Top End Bub. On 26 October 2026, Crombie was announced in part of the extended cast for Wentworth: Halfway Home.

Crombie is a First Nations Organiser for the Media, Entertainment and Arts Alliance (MEAA).

She is a member of the South Australian Film Corporation's First Nations Advisory Committee, launched in November 2020 as part of their First Nations Screen Strategy 2020-2025, in partnership with Channel 44.

== Personal life ==
Crombie met and fell in love with the man who would be father to her two sons, Andrew and Michael. After the birth of her second child she found herself feeling depressed, and soon afterwards the couple split up during a family holiday, and Crombie returned to South Australia with her boys. They lived there for some years but spent periods in Sydney for performances. As of 2016 they had been living in the Wollongong area for two years.

== Awards ==
Year	Title	Award	Category	Result	Ref.
2019	Barbara and the Camp Dogs	Helpmann Awards	Best Female Actor in a Supporting Role in a Musical	Won	
2020	Elaine Crombie	National Dreamtime Awards	Actor of the Year	Won	

== Filmography ==
=== Television ===
Year	Title	Role	Notes
2007	Jackie Jackie	Jinaali	TV movie
2012	Redfern Now	Evelyn	1 episode
2015	8MMM Aboriginal Radio	Milly	6 episodes
2016–2018	Black Comedy	Guest	7 episodes
2017	Top of the Lake	Bev	6 episodes
2017	Rosehaven	Gail	1 episode
2017	Kiki and Kitty	Kitty	6 episodes
2017–2019	Get Krack!n	Eloise Kroombe Businesswoman	2 episodes
2018	How To Stay Married'	Carol	1 episodes
2018	Nowhere Boys	Brianna	5 episodes
2018	The Housemate	Gloria	1 episode
2018	Grace Beside Me	Miss Long	7 episodes
2019	Sammy J	Cop	1 episode
2020	Thalu	Bits and Bobs	1 episode
2020	Drunk History: Australia	Mary's Mother, Officer	1 episode
2020–2022	Stuff Everyone Should Know About Australia	Host	7 episodes
2021	Wentworth	Aunty Fran	2 episodes
2021	Firebite	Coralee	2 episodes
2021	History Bites Back	Host	
2021–2023	RFDS	Ursula	3 episodes
2025	Invisible Boys	Aunty Doris	3 episodes
2025	Top End Bub	Dana	8 episodes
2026-	Wentworth: Halfway Home	May	TV series

=== Film ===
Year	Title	Role	Notes
2017	Dunes	Mum	Short
2019	Ties That Bind	Marlene	Short
2019	Top End Wedding	Dana	

== Theatre ==
=== As performer ===
Year	Title	Role	Notes	Ref
1999; 2000	The Sunshine Club		Regional Queensland tour, Playhouse with QTC. Sydney Opera House with STC	
2003	The Cherry Pickers		UK tour with STC	
2003	Conversations with the Dead		Belvoir, Sydney	
2011	Parramatta Girls		New Theatre, Sydney	
2011	Bloodland		Wharf Theatre, Sydney with STC & Bangarra Dance Theatre	
2011	The Maids	Madame	New Theatre, Sydney, Q Theatre, Penrith, Regional NSW tour	
2016	Blaque Showgirls	Chandon Connors	Malthouse Theatre, Melbourne	
2017–2019	Barbara and the Camp Dogs	Renee	Australian national tour	
2018	Astroman	Michelle Djalu	Arts Centre Melbourne with MTC	
2019; 2021; 2023	Janet's Vagrant Love	Janet	Spiegeltent at Adelaide Cabaret Festival, Adelaide Fringe, Belvoir, Sydney for Sydney Festival	
2021	The 7 Stages of Grieving		Australian tour with STC	
2022	Wudjang: Not the Past	Maren / Yugambeh Shearer	Bangarra Dance Theatre for Sydney Festival, Hobart, Adelaide Festival	
2022	This Is Who We Are House Party		British Council UK-Australia season	
2024	Baleen Moondjan	Gindara	Glenelg with Bangarra Dance Theatre for Adelaide Festival	

=== As writer/director ===
Year	Title	Role	Notes	Ref
2019; 2021; 2023	Janet's Vagrant Love	Writer	Spiegeltent at Adelaide Cabaret Festival, Adelaide Fringe, Belvoir, Sydney for Sydney Festival	
2022	Bungambrawartha	Director	Albury-Wodonga with HotHouse Theatre	
