= Logie Award for Most Outstanding Newcomer =

Australian television award

- Country: Australia
- Presented by: TV Week
- First award: 2006
- Currently held by: Miranda Tapsell (2015)
- Website: www.tvweeklogieawards.com.au

The Silver Logie for Most Outstanding Newcomer, also known as the Graham Kennedy Award for Most Outstanding Newcomer, was an award presented annually at the Australian TV Week Logie Awards. It was created in honour of Graham Kennedy following his death in 2005. The award was first presented at the 48th Annual TV Week Logie Awards, held in 2006 when it was originally called Most Outstanding New Talent. It was given to honour an outstanding performance of a new talent on an Australian program. It may or may not be their first television appearance, however it is their first major television role. The winner and nominees of this award was chosen by television industry juries. It was last presented in 2017.

== Winners and nominees ==
Key	Meaning
‡	Indicates the winner

Year	Nominees	Program(s)	Network	Ref
2006	Chris Lilley‡	We Can Be Heroes: Finding The Australian of the Year	ABC TV	
2006	Heath Franklin	The Ronnie Johns Half Hour	Network Ten	
2006	Adam Hills	Spicks and Specks	ABC TV	
2006	Matt Shirvington	Beyond Tomorrow	Seven Network	
2006	Kat Stewart	Supernova	UK.TV	
2007	Emma Lung‡	Stranded	SBS TV	
2007	Emily Barclay	The Silence	ABC TV	
2007	Aaron Fa'aoso	RAN Remote Area Nurse	SBS TV	
2007	Sam Parsonson	Love My Way	W. Channel	
2007	Alex Tilman	Answered by Fire	ABC TV	
2008	Tammy Clarkson‡	The Circuit	SBS TV	
2008	Adelaide Clemens	Love My Way	Showtime	
2008	Nicole da Silva	Dangerous	Fox8	
2008	Sean Keenan	Lockie Leonard	Nine Network	
2008	Zoe Ventoura	Kick	SBS TV	
2009	Jessica Marais‡	Packed to the Rafters	Seven Network	
2009	Lauren Clair	Underbelly	Nine Network	
2009	Hanna Mangan-Lawrence	Bed of Roses	ABC1	
2009	Hugh Sheridan	Packed to the Rafters	Seven Network	
2009	Ashley Zukerman	Rush	Network Ten	
2010	Matt Preston‡	MasterChef Australia	Network Ten	
2010	Anastasia Feneri	My Place	ABC3	
2010	Anna Hutchison	Underbelly: A Tale of Two Cities	Nine Network	
2010	Camille Keenan	Satisfaction	Showcase	
2010	Eva Lazzaro	Tangle	Showcase	
2011	Firass Dirani‡	Underbelly: The Golden Mile	Nine Network	
2011	Emma Booth	Underbelly: The Golden Mile	Nine Network	
2011	Ryan Corr	Packed to the Rafters	Seven Network	
2011	Richard Davies	Offspring	Network Ten	
2011	Sarah Snook	Sisters of War	ABC1	
2012	Chelsie Preston Crayford‡	Underbelly: Razor	Nine Network	
2012	Melissa Bergland	Winners & Losers	Seven Network	
2012	Anna McGahan	Underbelly: Razor	Nine Network	
2012	Hamish Macdonald	—N/a	Network Ten	
2012	Hamish Michael	Crownies	ABC1	
2013	Shari Sebbens‡	Redfern Now	ABC1	
2013	Annabel Crabb	Kitchen Cabinet	ABC2	
2013	Brenna Harding	Puberty Blues	Network Ten	
2013	Jason Montgomery	Underbelly: Badness	Nine Network	
2013	Natasa Ristic	Danger 5	SBS One	
2014	Remy Hii‡	Better Man	SBS One	
2014	Anna Bamford	Wonderland	Network Ten	
2014	Shareena Clanton	Wentworth	SoHo	
2014	Caren Pistorius	Paper Giants: Magazine Wars	ABC1	
2014	Meyne Wyatt	Redfern Now	ABC1	
2015	Miranda Tapsell‡	Love Child	Nine Network	
2015	Silvia Colloca	Made In Italy with Silvia Colloca	SBS One	
2015	Harriet Dyer	Love Child	Nine Network	
2015	Troy Kinne	Kinne	7mate	
2015	Brandon McClelland	ANZAC Girls	ABC	
2016 (Male)	Joel Jackson‡	Peter Allen: Not the Boy Next Door	Seven Network	
2016 (Male)	Joel Jackson	Deadline Gallipoli	Showcase	
2016 (Male)	Rahel Romahn	The Principal	SBS	
2016 (Female)	Melina Vidler‡	800 Words	Seven Network	
2016 (Female)	Hannah Monson	Glitch	ABC	
2016 (Female)	Sara West	Peter Allen: Not the Boy Next Door	Nine Network	
2017	Elias Anton‡	Barracuda	ABC	
2017	Tilda Cobham-Hervey	The Kettering Incident	Showcase	
2017	Rob Collins	Cleverman	ABC	
2017	Geraldine Hakewill	Wanted	Seven Network	
2017	Hunter Page-Lochard	Cleverman	ABC	

== See also ==
- George Wallace Memorial Logie for Best New Talent
- Logie Award for Most Popular New Male Talent
- Logie Award for Most Popular New Female Talent
- Logie Award for Most Popular New Talent
