= Wesley Enoch =

Australian playwright and artistic director (born 1969)

Wesley Enoch AM
- Born: Wesley James Enoch; 1969 (age 56–57); North Stradbroke Island, Queensland, Australia
- Education: Queensland University of Technology
- Occupations: Playwright, artistic director

Wesley James Enoch AM (born 1969) is an Australian playwright and artistic director. He is especially known for The 7 Stages of Grieving, co-written with Deborah Mailman. He was artistic director of the Queensland Theatre Company from mid-2010 until October 2015, and completed a five-year stint as director of the Sydney Festival in February 2021.

== Early and personal life ==
Wesley James Enoch was born on North Stradbroke Island/Minjerribah in 1969, the eldest son of Doug and Lyn Enoch. and grew up in Brisbane. He has four siblings and is the younger brother of Queensland government minister Leeanne Enoch. His heritage is Nunukul and Ngugi (two of three Quandamooka peoples from Stradbroke Island), but also has a mixture of Irish, English and Scottish blood, and Danish and Spanish blood on his (non-Indigenous) mother's side, and Filipino, Pacific Islander and Kandju heritage on his father's.

Enoch earned a Bachelor of Arts (Honours) degree at Queensland University of Technology (QUT).

As of 2021, Enoch is the domestic partner of past artistic director of Australian Ballet, David McAllister AC, since around 2008, although they have lived in different cities for much of the time.

== Career ==
From 1993 to 1997, Enoch was founding artistic director at Kooemba Jdarra Indigenous Performing Arts (in existence 1993–2007), where he directed a number of his own works. Kooemba Jdarra means "good ground" or "sweet land" in the Turrbal language of South East Queensland. Writer, director, and producer John Harvey also worked at Kooemba Jdarra. Dancer and choreographer Marilyn Rose Miller, daughter of Pat O'Shane and Mick Miller, became artistic director of the company in 2005.

In 1998 Enoch became associate artist at the Queensland Theatre Company, then served a term from 2000 to 2001 as resident director at Sydney Theatre Company. From 2003 to 2006, he was artistic director at Ilbijerri Aboriginal Torres Strait Islander Theatre Co-operative, remaining on the board until 2007. During his time at Ilbijerri, Enoch directed a number of Company B (later Belvoir) productions, including his own Black Medea in collaboration with Malthouse Theatre), and The Sapphires with Melbourne Theatre Company.

In 2007, his play The Story of the Miracles at Cookie's Table was presented in Sydney, with the cast headed by Leah Purcell.

From 2006 to 2008, took up the role of associate artistic director for Company B at the Belvoir St Theatre.

Other major theatre companies he has worked with include State Theatre Company of South Australia, Black Swan Theatre, Griffin Theatre Company, Hothouse Theatre, Yirra Yaakin, and Windmill Theatre .

In June 2010, his appointment as the new artistic director of the Queensland Theatre Company was announced, taking over from Michael Gow. He had previously directed several plays at the Company, and been an associate artist. He started in the new role firstly on a part-time basis from July 2010, and then full-time in January 2011.

Enoch worked with Tom Wright to develop his play Black Diggers, about Indigenous soldiers in World War I, which under Enoch's direction premiered at the Sydney Opera House in 2014 to great acclaim and was later performed in other states.

He left Queensland Theatre to become director of the Sydney Festival in October 2015, and served as director from February 2017 for a five-year term, with his last festival in 2021. During his time there, he introduced many works offering a wide range of perspectives by First Nations artists.

In March 2021 Enoch was appointed to the inaugural Indigenous Chair in the Creative Industries at QUT.

In August 2026, he delivered the inaugural Rhoda Roberts Oration at Byron Writers Festival, in which he paid tribute to Bundjalung theatre and arts director, arts executive, television presenter, and actress Rhoda Roberts, who had died earlier in the year. In his address, he spoke of her legacy for Indigenous culture, in particular her contributions to "identity, the sense of excellence, and the need for Blak spaces".

=== Other roles ===
- 2006 Commonwealth Games Opening Ceremony, director of the Indigenous section
- 2008 Festival of Pacific Arts (FOPA), artistic director for the Australian delegation
- 2018 Nick Enright Address at the National Playwrighting Festival
- 2018 Commonwealth Games on the Gold Coast, creative consultant, segment director and Indigenous consultant
- 2026 Delivered the inaugural Rhoda Roberts Oration at Byron Writers Festival
- Hothouse Theatre Artistic Directorate member
- Former Sydney Opera House trustee
- Member of the New South Wales Government's Arts Advisory Council
- Member of the external advisory panel to the Assemblage Centre for Creative Arts at Flinders University, headed by Garry Stewart (as of 2021)

== Oral history ==
Enoch was interviewed in 1996 by Jackie Huggins and Peter Read about his life and career. The recording can be found at the National Library of Australia.

== Written works ==
=== The 7 Stages of Grieving ===
Enoch is best-known for The 7 Stages of Grieving, a one-actor play co-written with Deborah Mailman in 1995 and first performed at the Metro Arts Theatre in Brisbane by Kooemba Jdarra Indigenous Performing Arts, with Mailman in the solo role and Enoch directing, on 1 September 1995. The play was published in book form in 1996, and has been much studied and written about since.

The title refers to seven phases of Aboriginal history, with the words referencing Elisabeth Kübler-Ross's model commonly known as the five stages of grief. The stages in the play move from the Dreaming to a future of where Aboriginal self-determination and reconciliation with settler Australians has been achieved. The seven stages comprise: Dreaming, Invasion, Genocide, Protection, Assimilation, Self-Determination and Reconciliation. The concept of the seven phases of Aboriginal history were identified and named as such by Michael Williams, director of Aboriginal and Torres Strait Islander studies at the University of Queensland when Enoch was teaching and Mailman was studying there during the 1990s. The linking of Kübler-Ross's model and Williams' framework that started the examination of "the concept that Indigenous history has been a long and complicated grieving process since colonisation". Using traditional cultural forms of "dance, song, music, visuals and storytelling", they workshopped their ideas for two years before first presenting a 30-minute version, and then developed it further along with dramaturge Hilary Beaton to its full length, presented in 1995. The play was during the early years of a formal reconciliation process in Australia, and not long after Enoch's grandmother had died on Minjerribah and Enoch had participated in some of the ancient Aboriginal rites associated with death and burial.

There were numerous performances of the play around Australia in the 1990s, as well as being performed at the Battersea Arts Centre in London as part of the London International Festival of Theatre in 1997. It has had several runs in Sydney, Adelaide and Brisbane during the 21st century. A touring production by the Sydney Theatre Company was originally scheduled for 2020, but, interrupted by the COVID-19 pandemic in Australia, was postponed until mid-2021. This production, directed by Shari Sebbens and performed by Elaine Crombie, is being staged in Sydney, Adelaide and Canberra.

=== Other works ===
Grace (1998) is a short film, first screened around Australia in a group of six short films, collectively titled "Shifting Sands".

Other works written by Enoch include: (Note: Dates reflect first performance of the work as recorded in AusStage.)

- Little White Dress
- A Life of Grace and Piety (1998)
- The Sunshine Club (1999)
- Black Medea (2000)
- The Story of the Miracles at Cookie's Table (2006)
- I Am Eora (2012)

== Recognition ==
In 2002, Enoch was the recipient of an Australia Council for the Arts residency at the Cité internationale des arts in Paris.

The Sapphires (2004) won Helpmann Awards for Best Production and Best New Australian Work; remounted at the 2005 Sydney Festival

His The Story of the Miracles at Cookie's Table won the 2005 Patrick White Playwrights' Award,

Enoch was awarded the Member of the Order of Australia in the Australia Day Honours in 2020, "For significant service to the performing arts as an Indigenous director and playwright".

== Productions ==
Works directed and/or produced by Enoch include:

- Appropriate, STC
- Bitin' Back, Kooemba Jdarra
- The Sapphires (2004)
- The Cherry Pickers, by Kevin Gilbert
- Stolen
- Parramatta Girls, by Alana Valentine
- Fountains Beyond
- Purple Dreams
- Paul, by Howard Brenton
- EORA Crossing
- RiverlanD, by Scott Rankin
- Fountains Beyond
- Romeo and Juliet, Bell Shakespeare
- Black-ed Up
- The Dreamers
- Wonderlands
- Conversations with the Dead
- Rainbow's End, Koeemba Jdarra
- One Night the Moon, Malthouse Theatre
- Mother Courage and Her Children, QTC
- Bombshells, QTC
- Head Full of Love, QTC
- Black Diggers, QTC/Sydney Festival
- Trollop, by Maxine Mellor
