= The Djarn Djarns =

- Directed by: Wayne Blair.
- Written by: Wayne Blair
- Produced by: Kylie Du Fresne; Kerrie Mainwaring
- Cinematography: Eric Murray Lui
- Music by: Steve Francis
- Release date: 2005
- Running time: 26 minutes
- Country: Australia
- Language: English

The Djarn Djarns is a 2005 Australian short film, written and directed by Wayne Blair.

== Synopsis ==
The film tells the story of an eleven-year-old Aboriginal boy, Frankie Dollar, as he comes to terms with his father's death. The name of the film derives from the name of the dance group that Frankie leads and who perform at the local culture centre alongside his friends.

== Release ==
In Australia, the film premiered at the Message Stick Indigenous Art Festival in Sydney in 2005 before screening on SBS Television.

== Awards ==
The Djarn Djarns was the winner of the 2005 Crystal Bear for Best Short Film as part of the Kinderfilmfest, in the Berlin International Film Festival.

It was nominated for Best Screenplay in a Short Film and Best Editing in a Non-Feature at the Australian Film Institute Awards.
