= The Sapphires (play) =

Play by Tony Briggs

The Sapphires is an Australian play written by Tony Briggs and directed by Wesley Enoch. It is set in 1968 (a year after the referendum, which symbolically expanded the rights of Aboriginal people) and it tells the story of The Sapphires, a singing group of four Yorta Yorta women who tour Vietnam during the war.

It was inspired by the true story of Briggs's mother, Laurel Robinson, and aunt, Lois Peeler, who toured Vietnam as singers. The pair slept on the stage, as Robinson recalled: "It was so scary – one night a bomb went off, the bed fell down and the place shook."

Though set at the time of increasing calls for Aboriginal rights, the play takes these issues seriously but in a way that does not detract from its fun and humour and adds to its entertainment value.

== Productions ==
The play debuted with the Melbourne Theatre Company in 2004 and continued at Sydney's Company B in 2005. The original cast included Deborah Mailman, Rachael Maza, Ursula Yovich and Lisa Flanagan.

It was revived by Black Swan and Company B in 2010, with Christine Anu, Casey Donovan, Hollie Andrew and Kylie Farmer playing the lead roles. The show ran at Daegu International Music Festival mid-2010 where Donovan won the award for Best Supporting Actress. This company also toured to Adelaide and was a part of the Adelaide Festival. In 2011 The lead cast was Donovan, Lisa Maza, Ngaire Pigram and Megan Sarmardin.

The show appeared at the Barbican Centre in London for two weeks in March 2011. The four leading cast members were Donovan, Maza, Pigram and Sarmardin. The rest of the cast was Aljin Abella, Jimi Bani, Markus Hamilton and Oliver Wenn.

Peter Farnan of Boom Crash Opera fame was the musical director for the show.

== Film version ==
Production of the movie version began in 2011. The leads have gone to Deborah Mailman (from the original production), Jessica Mauboy, Shari Sebbens and Miranda Tapsell. Although Donovan received strong reviews in the 2010 production, and auditioned for the movie version, she was ultimately not chosen to star.

== Awards ==
- 2005 Helpmann Award - Best Play
- 2005 Helpmann Award - Best New Australian Work
