= Witness of Truth: The Railway Murders =

- Genre: Docudrama
- Directed by: Bren Simson
- Starring: Huw Higginson; Nicholas Marchie; Mark Spalding; Nick Burnell; Caroline Woodruff; Joanna Monro; Stephen Gurney; Duncan Primrose (police officer from van); Shane Hodges; Wayne johnson Mick Catt Mick Catt />Robert Swann
- Narrated by: Lindsay Duncan
- Country of origin: United Kingdom
- Original language: English

Production
- Executive producer: Adelene Alani
- Producer: Bren Simson
- Running time: 50 minutes

Original release
- Network: BBC1
- Release: 11 December 2001

Witness of Truth: The Railway Murders is a British television docudrama, first broadcast on 11 December 2001, that dramatises the crimes committed by John Duffy and David Mulcahy, commonly known as the Railway Rapists or Railway Killers. The film, produced and directed by Bren Simson, is narrated by Lindsay Duncan, who provides additional details of the crimes, some of which are not dramatised in the film. Huw Higginson and Nicholas Marchie were cast as Mulcahy and Duffy respectively, with Steve Chaplin and Tat Whalley portraying teenage versions of the pair.

Adelene Alani acted as executive producer. Other notable cast members include Mark Spalding, who co-starred alongside Higginson in The Bill in 1995, Caroline Woodruff, Joanna Monro and Robert Swann. The film broadcast at 22:35; subsequently no viewing figures for the programme were recorded by BARB. The film has never been repeated and remains unreleased on VHS and DVD.

== Cast ==
- Huw Higginson as David Mulcahy
- Nicholas Marchie as John Duffy
- Steve Chaplin as Young David Mulcahy
- Tat Whalley as Young John Duffy
- Mark Spalding as Det. Supt. Andy Murphy
- Nick Burnell as Det. Insp. Mark Freeman
- Caroline Woodruf as Det. Con. Caroline Murphy
- Joanna Monro as Jenny Cutler
- Stephen Gurney as Det. Con. Larry Larmour
- Robert Swann as Det. Supt. Les Bolland
- Sarah Farooqui as Alison Day
- Claire Kent as Maartje Tamboezer
- Leah Fletcher as Ann Lock
- John Saglimbeni as Joseph Clark
- Joanna Kirkland as Stella Arnold
- Jayne Dobson as Tina Clark
- Emma O'Donoghue as Pamela Taylor
- Duncan Primrose as police officer in van
- Shane Hodges- Ginger Police officer
- Mick Catt - Police officer in van
- Wayne Johnson - Police officer in van
