= Brett C. Leonard =

American dramatist

Brett C. Leonard is an American dramatist, screenwriter and producer. A member of the LAByrinth Theater Company of New York City, he is best known for his tragic drama The Long Red Road which was performed at the Goodman Theatre in Chicago with Philip Seymour Hoffman as director and Tom Hardy as the lead, as well as for his play "Guinea Pig Solo", originally produced as the first co-production between LAByrinth and NY's Public Theater, starring John Ortiz.

Leonard also wrote and produced for the HBO TV series Hung (2011), wrote and served as a Supervising Producer for the AMC series Low Winter Sun, was a writer and Co-Executive Producer on Amazon's Mad Dogs, a Co-Executive Producer on Apple TV’s “Shantaram,” a Consulting Producer on AMC's Fear the Walking Dead, and creative consultant on BBC/FX drama Taboo.

Also of note are his plays "Ninth and Joanie" directed by Mark Wing-Davey, produced in New York City by LAByrinth Theater Company, Roger and Vanessa, produced at Theatre 503 in London, The Actors' Gang in Los Angeles and Tap Gallery in Sydney, "Snapshot" at Chicago's Collaboraction Theater, and Unconditional, produced by LAByrinth at NYC's Public Theater, directed by Mark Wing-Davey and published in New Playwrights: The Best Plays of 2008. His plays have been produced in New York, London, Chicago, Los Angeles, Toronto, Berlin, Sydney, Melbourne, etc. Leonard has been nominated for a WGA award, won the Daryl Roth Creative Spirit Award, and has written several one-acts, including his award-winning "What I'm Looking For," which premiered in Chicago's Sketchbook Festival. His low-budget film "Jailbait", based on his play, starred Michael Pitt and Stephen Adly Guirgis, premiered at the Tribeca Film Festival, won Best Narrative Feature at Lake Placid Film Festival and was released theatrically in 2005. He divides his time between Los Angeles and New York City with longtime girlfriend Elizabeth Rodriguez. He is set to write and executive produce a tv series for Miramax based on Gangs of New York, to be directed and executive produced by Martin Scorsese. Leonard is the co-creator and an executive producer on AMC Studios’ upcoming limited series The Grapes of Wrath.
