= The Artful Dodger (2023 TV series) =

Australian television series

- Genre: Historical drama; Heist drama
- Created by: James McNamara; David Maher; David Taylor
- Inspired by: Oliver Twist by Charles Dickens
- Written by: James McNamara; Andrew Knight; Vivienne Walsh; Dan Knight; Kate Mulvany; Miranda Tapsell
- Directed by: Jeffrey Walker; Corrie Chen; Gracie Otto; Ben Young; Ben C. Lucas
- Starring: Thomas Brodie-Sangster; David Thewlis; Maia Mitchell; Damon Herriman; Tim Minchin; Luke Bracey
- Composer: Antony Partos
- Country of origin: Australia
- Original language: English
- No. of series: 2
- No. of episodes: 16

Production
- Executive producers: David Maher; David Taylor; Jo Porter; Rachel Gardner; James McNamara
- Producers: Ross Allsop; Cameron Welsh
- Cinematography: Damian Wyvill; Campbell Brown
- Running time: 43–53 minutes
- Production companies: Curio Pictures; Beach Road Pictures; Sony Pictures Television

Original release
- Network: Disney+
- Release: 29 November 2023 – present

The Artful Dodger is an Australian historical heist drama television series created by James McNamara, David Maher, and David Taylor, and produced by Curio Pictures, Beach Road Pictures and Sony Pictures Television for Disney+. It acts as a sequel to the Charles Dickens novel Oliver Twist (1838), and stars Thomas Brodie-Sangster as the eponymous Artful Dodger, David Thewlis as Norbert Fagin, and Maia Mitchell as Lady Belle Fox. The first series premiered on 29 November 2023. In November 2024, it was renewed for a second series that premiered on 10 February 2026. In August 2026, it was renewed for a third and final series.

== Synopsis ==
In 1850s Australia, Jack Dawkins, a former Royal Navy surgeon, establishes himself as a respected young doctor. When an old acquaintance, Norbert Fagin, resurfaces, it forces Jack, once a London-based pickpocket known as the "Artful Dodger", back into a life of crime. Jack forms an attachment to the governor's daughter, Lady Belle Fox, who aspires to be a surgeon. As Jack's past intersects with the present and external forces jeopardise his goals, his life unravels, raising questions about whether he can genuinely reshape his life in the colony as he had envisioned.

== Cast and characters ==
=== Main ===
- Thomas Brodie-Sangster as Dr Jack Dawkins / Artful Dodger, who was busted out of prison and seconded to the Royal Navy where his skilled fingers helped him become a surgeon. Decorated in the Crimean War for his medical work, he was recommended to serve in the colony.
  - Finn Treacy (guest season 1) portrays the young Artful Dodger during flashbacks.
- David Thewlis as Norbert Fagin, Jack's former surrogate father and a convicted thief. Transported to Port Victory as a criminal, he finds Jack and uses their history to his advantage. Jack allows Fagin to explore the underside of society for his grift and benefit.
- Maia Mitchell as Lady Belle Fox, the strong-willed daughter of the governor of Port Victory who opposes societal norms. She studies medical literature from which she brings innovations to the local hospital, and wants Jack to train her to become the first female surgeon. She also serves as Jack's love interest.
- Damon Herriman as Captain Lucien Gaines (season 1), the cunning and zealous but often cruel commander of the colony's soldiers in Port Victory
- Tim Minchin as Darius Cracksworth (seasons 2–3; supporting season 1), the corrupt harbour master of Port Victory
- Luke Bracey as Inspector Henry Boxer (season 2), Lucien's replacement as head of the colony's soldiers, who investigates a series of murders in Port Victory. Unlike his predecessor, he is sophisticated, honourable, and less prone to violence.

=== Supporting ===
- Miranda Tapsell as Frances "Red" Scrubbs (season 1), a notorious thief and wanted criminal
- Luke Carroll as Tim Billiberllary, an assistant at the Port Victory hospital and Jack's friend
- Kym Gyngell as Professor Alistair McGregor (seasons 1–2), Port Victory's alcoholic chief surgeon and Jack's superior
- Vivienne Awosoga as Hetty Baggett, the head nurse at the Port Victory hospital
- Nicholas Burton as Dr Rainsford Sneed, an experienced surgeon and Jack's main rival
- Susie Porter as Lady Jane Fox, the governor's shrewd yet compassionate wife
- Damien Garvey as Governor Edmund Fox, the governor of Port Victory
- Lucy-Rose Leonard as Lady Fanny Fox, Belle's younger sister, who resents her for refusing to follow social convention
- Jessica De Gouw as Peggy Gaines (season 1), Lucien's wife, who is secretly having an affair with Darius
- Andrea Demetriades as Marianne Cracksworth (season 1), Darius' sister
- Albert Latailakepa as Aputi Savea, a boxing champion and gravedigger who works with Fagin
- Justin Smith as Tinkler Duckett (season 1), the governor's drinking companion
- Tom Budge as Hon. Mortimer Smales (season 1), a rich suitor invited to Port Victory by the governor to court one of his daughters
- Jude Hyland as Charlie Salt (season 1), a crafty street child
- Stephen Ryan as Edwin (season 1), the governor's butler
- Brigid Zengeni as Rosemary "Rotty" Falkirk, the bartender and owner of a pub frequented by Jack and his friends
- Fayssal Bazzi as Captain Sebastian Grimm (season 1), a British officer whom Jack previously served under during the Crimean War
- Huw Higginson as Father Cruikshanks, Port Victory's sinful priest
- Ezekiel Simat as Ned Monks (season 1), a petty criminal and the half-brother of Oliver Twist, who reemerges to torment Jack
- Michael Sheasby as Sergeant Bramwell, a high-ranking soldier serving under Lucien
- Aljin Abella as Bayani "Flashbang" Rivera, an explosive specialist and Jack's friend
- Maua Fuifui as Grunters (season 1), Darius' physically imposing henchman
- Nicholas Hope as Justice Micawber, Port Victory's judge
- Hal Cumpston as Oliver Twist (season 1), Jack's former friend, who is partially responsible for his downfall, now a wealthy gentleman
- Jeremy Sims as Richard "Dickie" Fox (season 2), the governor's troublesome older brother
- Zac Burgess as Phineas Golden (season 2), Dickie's personal aide, with whom Fanny becomes infatuated
- Jimmy Fitzgibbon as Smike (season 2), a street child whom Fagin pays for information
- Tim Matthews as Constable Bricks (season 2), a soldier who serves under Henry
- Mark Langham as Affrey Giles (season 2), the governor's new butler
- Kate Mulvany as Elizabeth Maxwell (season 2), a rich widow seeking to purchase land
- Toby Schmitz as Ludwig Leichhardt (season 2), a renowned explorer
- Benedict Hardie as Uriah Heep (season 2), a vile and manipulative representative of the East India Company
- Ewen Leslie as Dr Silas Wickenby (season 3)
- Stephen Curry as Seth Pecksniff (season 3)
- Broden Kelly as Bill Sikes (season 3)
- Pamela Rabe (season 3)
- Justin Rosniak (season 3)

== Episodes ==
Series	Episodes	Originally released
1	8	29 November 2023
2	8	10 February 2026

=== Season 1 (2023) ===
No. overall	No. in season	Title	Directed by	Written by	Original release date
1	1	"The Yankee Dodge"	Jeffrey Walker	James McNamara	29 November 2023
2	2	"Blessings of St. Coccyx"	Jeffrey Walker	Andrew Knight	29 November 2023
3	3	"Dead Men's Secrets"	Corrie Chen	James McNamara	29 November 2023
4	4	"The Stitch Up"	Corrie Chen	Vivienne Walsh	29 November 2023
5	5	"The Duel"	Gracie Otto	Andrew Knight	29 November 2023
6	6	"Bully in the Alley"	Gracie Otto	James McNamara & Vivienne Walsh	29 November 2023
7	7	"Wet Lettuce"	Jeffrey Walker	Andrew Knight & Dan Knight	29 November 2023
8	8	"Untapped Potential"	Jeffrey Walker	James McNamara	29 November 2023

=== Season 2 (2026) ===
No. overall	No. in season	Title	Directed by	Written by	Original release date
9	1	"Hangman"	Ben Young	James McNamara	10 February 2026
10	2	"Entry Level Toff"	Ben Young	Dan Knight	10 February 2026
11	3	"Belle of the Ball"	Ben C. Lucas	Kate Mulvany	10 February 2026
12	4	"Platinum"	Ben C. Lucas	Miranda Tapsell & James McNamara	10 February 2026
13	5	"Ice Melts"	Ben C. Lucas	Dan Knight	10 February 2026
14	6	"Bellybutton"	Gracie Otto	James McNamara	10 February 2026
15	7	"Salt Peter"	Gracie Otto	Kate Mulvany	10 February 2026
16	8	"Change of Heart"	Gracie Otto	James McNamara	10 February 2026

== Production ==
=== Development ===
The series was developed and created by James McNamara, David Maher and David Taylor, and was first announced in 2022. It is a co-production between Sony Pictures Television's Curio Pictures and Beach Road Pictures. Jo Porter executive produces for Curio Pictures, while David Maher and David Taylor executive produce for Beach Road Pictures with Ross Allsop as series producer. Writers for the first season include McNamara, Andrew Knight, Vivienne Walshe, and Dan Knight, while directors include Jeffrey Walker, Corrie Chen, and Gracie Otto.

On 20 November 2024, Disney+ renewed the series for a second series at their APAC (Asia Pacific) showcase event in Singapore. Co-creator James McNamara and Dan Knight returned to write for the second series, while new writers included Kate Mulvany and Miranda Tapsell. Gracie Otto returned to direct, while new directors included Ben Young and Ben C. Lucas. Jo Porter and Rachel Gardner returned to executive produce with McNamara joining them and Cameron Welsh as series producer. The season also featured outfits created by costume designer Marion Boyce.

On 4 August 2026, Disney+ renewed the series for a third and final series.

=== Casting ===
In November 2022, the lead cast of Thomas Brodie-Sangster, David Thewlis, and Maia Mitchell was announced. Brodie-Sangster and Mitchell read through real-life historical case files from the era and had medical experts to help them prepare for their roles. The rest of the cast consists of a majority of Australian actors, including Damon Herriman, Tim Minchin, Miranda Tapsell and Susie Porter.

In December 2025, Luke Bracey, Jeremy Sims, and Zac Burgess were confirmed to have joined the cast for the second series.

In October 2026, Ewen Leslie, Stephen Curry, Broden Kelly, Pamela Rabe, and Justin Rosniak joined the cast for the third and final series.

=== Filming ===
Filming for the first series took place between November 2022 and March 2023 in Sydney, New South Wales. The production had access to a former psychiatric hospital precinct in Sydney, preserved from the 19th century with the production surrounding the existing sandstone buildings with standing sets. Filming locations also included Elizabeth Farm in the Western Sydney suburbs, Rookwood Cemetery, Callan Park, and the northern headland of Botany Bay, Cape Banks. The first scene Mitchell and Brodie-Sangster shot together was an intimate scene from the last episode; before shooting that scene Mitchell felt she didn't have chemistry with Brodie-Sangster because they had very different personalities and feared that-that would translate onto the screen but, upon shooting, realized she was wrong.

Filming for the second series took place between February and May 2025 at Callan Park in Sydney.

== Release ==
Promotional poster

The first series premiered in Australia on 29 November 2023 on Disney+, via its Star hub. Internationally, it also premiered on Star+ in Latin America and on Hulu in the United States. In the United Kingdom and Ireland, the first series premiered on 17 January 2024 on Disney+.

The second series premiered on 10 February 2026.

== Reception ==
On the review aggregator website Rotten Tomatoes, the first season has an approval rating of 92% based on reviews from 25 critics. The website's critics consensus reads, "Given roguish gravitas by the well-cast Thomas Brodie-Sangster and David Thewlis, The Artful Dodger picks Dickens' pocket and makes the most of his iconic creation".

Luke Buckmaster of The Guardian gave the series four stars out of five, described it as "darkly comedic", and praised the editing for helping the series maintain a "wild energy". Maggie Lovitt of Collider praised the "stellar cast, sumptuous costumes, plucky score, and surprising story, the series is easily one of the best—and most refreshing—to debut on the streamer this year". Dan Einav of The Financial Times praised the performances, saying "Thewlis steals every scene" and "Brodie-Sangster is well-cast as a young man caught between his innate impish spirit and efforts to be a responsible professional".
