= Huw Higginson =

English actor (born 1964)

- Born: 21 February 1964 (age 62); Hillingdon, Middlesex, England
- Occupation: Actor
- Years active: 1976–present
- Spouse: Hannah Waterman (m. 2022)
- Children: 3
- Father: Tim Wylton

Huw Higginson (born 21 February 1964) is a British-born actor, based in Australia, who is best known for playing PC George Garfield in The Bill from 1989 to 1999.

Higginson has also appeared in Heartbeat, EastEnders, Casualty, By Any Means and Jessica. He appeared as Mr Cunningham in two stories of The Sarah Jane Adventures entitled The Day of the Clown and The Mark of the Berserker.

After relocating to Australia in 2014, Higginson has appeared in numerous Australian television programmes and stage productions. Some of the roles he has played since moving to Australia include General Birdwood in Deadline Gallipoli, Malcolm Hammill in Rake, Wayne Page in Janet King, Gus Reardon in Secret City and Dr. Samuels in A Place to Call Home.

On stage in Australia, Higginson has appeared in Love Letters, The House on the Lake and Tom Wells' The Kitchen Sink.

In 2016, Higginson adopted an Australian accent to play a commander in Meat and Livestock Australia's controversial "Operation Boomerang" We Love Lamb Australia Day commercial, part of the organisation's annual campaign to promote the consumption of lamb. The next year, it was announced Higginson would appear in Picnic at Hanging Rock, a six-part Foxtel television series produced by FremantleMedia Australia, adapted from Joan Lindsay's novel of the same name.

In 2019, he appeared in a featured role in the Australian Broadcasting Corporation mini-series Total Control and in the film Top End Wedding. In 2021 he appeared in Wentworth.

In 2023, Higginson was announced for 2024 ABC Series Ladies in Black.

== Filmography ==
=== Film ===
Year	Title	Role	Notes
TBA	Mary 3691	Raymond Kray	In development
TBA	A Bird on a Balcony	Handler	Short film – Pre Production
2023	Mercy Road		Feature film
2019	Top End Wedding	Trevor Ford	Feature film
2018	The Nightingale	Magistrate	Feature film
2015	Mary: The Making of a Princess	Esben Anderson	TV movie
2013	Full Time	Paul	Short film
2004	The Bill @ 21	PC George Garfield	TV movie
2004	Jessica	Prosecutor	TV movie
2001	Witness of Truth	David Mulchay (adult)	TV movie
2001	The Hunt	Terry	TV movie
1978	Will Shakespeare	Sampson	TV movie

=== Television ===
Year	Title	Role	Notes	Refs
2025	Ghosts: Australia	Paths of Bath Narrator	TV series: 1 episode (1.4)	
2025	Top End Bub	Trevor Ford	TV series: 8 episodes	
2024	Ladies in Black	Mr. Ryder	TV series: 6 episodes	
2019–2024	Total Control	Peter Solomon	TV series, 18 episodes	
2023-2026	The Artful Dodger	Father Cruikshanks	TV series, 9 episodes	
2023	Gold Diggers	Fergus	TV series, 6 episodes	
2022	Barons	Mr Lockwood	TV series, 3 episodes	
2020–21	Wentworth	Gavin Thompson	TV series, 9 episodes	
2019	Lambs of God	Mr Colquin	TV series, 2 episodes	
2018	Picnic at Hanging Rock	Jasper Cosgrove	TV miniseries, 2 episodes	
2018	Chosen	Truck Driver	TV series, 1 episode	
2017	A Place to Call Home	Dr Samuels	TV series, 3 episodes	
2017	Janet King	Wayne Page	TV series, 6 episodes	
2017	The Leftovers	The Pastor	TV series, 1 episode	
2016	Secret City	Reardon	TV series, 6 episodes	
2016	Rake	Malcolm Hammil	TV series, 1 episode	
2015	The Secret River	Alexander King	TV series, 2 episodes	
2015	Miss Fisher's Murder Mysteries	George Greeves	TV series (S3 ep2)	
2015	Deadline Gallipoli	General Birdwood	TV series, 1 episode	
2015	Hiding	Irvin Blake	TV series, 3 episodes	
2014	Da Vinci's Demons	Vezzi	TV series,1 episode	
2014	Home and Away	Dr Matthews	TV series, 2 episodes	
2013	By Any Means	DS Grant	TV series, 1 episode	
2012	Peep Show	Dave Franks	TV series, 1 episode	
2006–12	Doctors	Henry / Peter / David	TV series, 3 episodes	
2012	Inspector Lewis	Stephen Pettle	TV series, 1 episode	
2001–09	Heartbeat	Ted/Barry	TV series, 2 episodes	
2008	The Sarah Jane Adventures	Mr Cunningham	TV series, 2 episodes	
2001–06	Casualty	Ian Bradshaw/ Brian Todd	TV series, 2 episodes	
2005	Blessed	Builder	TV series, 5 episodes	
2005	The Giblet Boys	Jed	TV series	
2004	The Basil Brush Show	Charlotte's Father	TV series, 1 episode	
2004	Holby City	Roger Russell	TV series, 1 episode	
2001	EastEnders	John Davis	TV series, 13 episodes	
1989–99	The Bill	PC George Garfield	TV series, 682 episodes	
1996	The Bill: Target	PC Garfield		
1989	Screen Two	Phil	TV series, 1 episode	
1988	How We Used to Live	Roger Brady	TV series, 6 episodes	
1986	Big Deal	Colin	TV series, 1 episode	
1976	Jumbo Spencer	Mike	TV series, 5 episodes	

== Personal life ==
Higginson is married to Hannah Waterman. He currently lives in the Sydney suburb of Balmain.

Higginson is the son of actors Tim Wylton and Ann Curthoys. Wylton was born Timothy Higginson and is best known for his roles in As Time Goes By and My Hero.
