= Top End Bub =

Australian television series

- Genre: Drama; Comedy
- Created by: Miranda Tapsell; Joshua Tyler
- Based on: Top End Wedding by Miranda Tapsell; Joshua Tyler
- Written by: Miranda Tapsell; Joshua Tyler
- Directed by: Christiaan Van Vuuren; Shari Sebbens
- Starring: Miranda Tapsell; Gwilym Lee
- Country of origin: Australia
- Original language: English
- No. of seasons: 1
- No. of episodes: 8

Production
- Executive producers: Miranda Tapsell; Joshua Tyler; Rosemary Blight
- Production company: Goalpost Pictures

Original release
- Network: Prime Video
- Release: 12 September 2025

Top End Bub is an Australian comedy drama television series created by Miranda Tapsell and Joshua Tyler. It was released on Prime Video on 12 September 2025. An eight-part series, it is a sequel to the 2019 film Top End Wedding, with Miranda Tapsell and Gwilym Lee reprising their roles.

== Premise ==
Lauren and Ned are living their best life in the city, which is tragically interrupted when Lauren’s sister Ronelle dies in a car crash in the Top End. Rushing back to Darwin, Lauren and Ned are thrown into the chaos of Top End life with Lauren’s parents, Daffy and Trevor, and confronted with another curveball when they unexpectedly become the guardians of Ronelle’s lively and cheeky young daughter, Taya.

== Cast ==
- Miranda Tapsell as Lauren Ford Pelton
- Gwilym Lee as Ned Pelton
- Ursula Yovich as Daffy Ford
- Huw Higginson as Trevor Ford
- Elaine Crombie as Dana
- Tracy Mann as Annie Pelton
- Rob Collins as Jarad
- Guy Simon as Leroy
- Clarence Ryan as Cowboy
- Gladys-May Kelly as Taya ('Bub')
- Brooke Satchwell

== Episodes ==
No.	Title	Directed by	Written by	Original release date
1	"Sisters"	Christiaan van Vuuren & Shari Sebbens	Joshua Tyler & Miranda Tapsell	12 September 2025
2	"Queen Taya"	Christiaan van Vuuren	Joshua Tyler & Miranda Tapsell	12 September 2025
3	"It’s Mango, It’s Ice-Cream"	Christiaan van Vuuren	Joshua Tyler & Miranda Tapsell	12 September 2025
4	"Best Birthday Ever?"	Christiaan van Vuuren	Joshua Tyler & Miranda Tapsell	12 September 2025
5	"Aunty Coming Through!"	Shari Sebbens	Adrian Russell Wills	12 September 2025
6	"Freedom Cheese"	Shari Sebbens	Julia Moriarty	12 September 2025
7	"What Winning Feels Like"	Shari Sebbens	Marissa Behrendt	12 September 2025
8	"Cyclone Lauren"	Christiaan van Vuuren	Joshua Tyler & Miranda Tapsell	12 September 2025

== Production ==
In April 2024, an eight-part sequel series was announced, titled Top End Bub, with Tapsell and Lee returning as series leads. The series is created, executive produced, and written by Joshua Tyler and Tapsell and produced by Goalpost Pictures. It was filmed in The Northern Territory and Adelaide and is directed by Christiaan Van Vuuren and Shari Sebbens.

Other returning cast members include Ursula Yovich, Huw Higginson, Elaine Crombie, and Tracy Mann. Joining them are Rob Collins, Brooke Satchwell, Guy Simon, Clarence Ryan, and, making her acting debut as Taya ("Bub"), is Gladys-May Kelly.

The series premiered on Prime Video in Australia and New Zealand on 12 September 2025, and will be distributed internationally by ZDF Studios.

== Critical reception ==
David Knox of TV Tonight rate it 4 out of 5 stars calling it “a breath of fresh air” along with “modern, heartwarming and deadly”. Stephen A Russell, writer for Screen Hub, gave the series the same star rating saying it is “Sassy family fun” but also “cheesy in a good way”. Tara Watson, writer for Mamamia, called it “delightful” but also said “Along with all the sugary rom-com feels, the series offers a tender exploration of Aboriginal and Torres Strait Islander culture, and the bonds that help us heal through periods of grief.”

== See also ==
- List of Australian television series
