= Black Comedy (TV series) =

2014–2020 Australian comedy TV series

- Also known as: Don't Be Afraid of the Darkies
- Genre: Sketch comedy
- Written by: Nakkiah Lui; Steven Oliver; Adam Briggs and many others
- Directed by: Beck Cole; Craig Anderson; Erica Glynn
- Starring: Jon Bell; Aaron Fa'aoso; Nakkiah Lui; Steven Oliver; Bjorn Stewart; Elizabeth Wymarra; Adam Briggs; Ian Zaro
- Composers: Andrew Lancaster; David McCormack; Antony Partos; Alejandro Gomez Sanchez; Matteo Zingales
- Country of origin: Australia
- Original language: English
- No. of series: 4
- No. of episodes: 24

Production
- Executive producer: Sally Riley
- Producers: Kath Shelper; Mark O'Toole
- Cinematography: Eric Murray Lui
- Production company: Scarlett Pictures

Original release
- Network: ABC
- Release: 5 November 2014 – 11 March 2020

Black Comedy is an Australian television sketch comedy program produced by Scarlett Pictures which first screened on ABC on 5 November 2014. Series 4 aired in February–March 2020. Regular cast included Jon Bell, Aaron Fa'aoso, Wayne Blair, Adam Briggs, Nayuka Gorrie, and Steven Oliver.

== Synopsis ==
Black Comedy combines a mix of observational and physical sketches, historical sketches and parodies of TV, film and commercials, looking at Australian culture through the eyes of Indigenous Australians.

== Cast ==
=== Main / regular ===
- Aaron Fa'aoso as various characters (24 episodes)
- Nakkiah Lui as various characters (24 episodes) (also writer)
- Elizabeth Wymarra as various characters (17 episodes)
- Nayuka Gorrie as various characters (10 episodes) (also wrote for seasons 3 & 4)
- Matt Day as various characters (13 episodes)
- Maci-Grace Johnson as various characters (12 episodes)
- Bjorn Stewart as various characters (12 episodes)
- Steven Oliver as various characters (12 episodes) (also writer)
- Dalara Williams as various characters (12 episodes)
- Gabriel Willie as various characters (12 episodes)
- David Woodhead as various characters (12 episodes)
- Meyne Wyatt (9 episodes)
- Deborah Mailman (9 episodes)
- Adam Briggs as various characters (9 episodes) (also writer)
- Wayne Blair as various characters (7 episodes)
- Jack Charles as Judge / various (7 episodes)
- Lisa Hensley (7 episodes)
- Jon Bell as various characters (6 episodes)
- Rarriwuy Hick as various characters (6 episodes)
- Luke Carroll as Uncle Dave (6 episodes)
- Ian Zaro as various characters (6 episodes)

=== Guests ===
- Anita Hegh (5 episodes)
- Brendan Cowell (4 episodes)
- Brooke Satchwell as Tiffany (2 episodes)
- Bruce Spence (1 episode)
- Casey Donovan (1 episode)
- Chris Haywood as Elenco Invitado (1 episode)
- Christine Anu as herself (4 episodes)
- Claudia Karvan (1 episode)
- Costa Georgiadis (2 episodes)
- Craig Anderson (2 episodes)
- Elaine Crombie (6 episodes)
- Felix Williamson (1 episode)
- Guy Edmonds (3 episodes)
- Harriet Dyer (2 episodes)
- Ian Roberts (1 episode)
- Jay Laga'aia (1 episode)
- Jeff McMullen (1 episode)
- Jeremy Lindsay Taylor (2 episodes)
- Jeremy Sims (1 episode)
- Jimi Bani as Officer Ed Scarlett / Regg / Uncle Jimmy (4 episodes)
- John Batchelor (1 episode)
- Lasarus Ratuere (1 episode)
- Leah Purcell (3 episodes)
- Leeanna Walsman (1 episode)
- Maggie Dence (2 episodes)
- Mia Wasikowska (1 episode)
- Michael Denkha (1 episode)
- Michael Dorman (1 episode)
- Michael Veitch (1 episode)
- Miranda Tapsell (4 episodes)
- Ningali Lawford (4 episodes)
- Rob Collins as Prosecutor Chris (1 episode)
- Robbie Magasiva (1 episode)
- Rupert Reid (1 episode)
- Sacha Horler (2 episodes)
- Sean Choolburra (6 episodes)
- Shari Sebbens (4 episodes)
- Toby Schmitz (1 episode)
- Trevor Jamieson (5 episodes)
- Vanessa Downing (1 episode)

== Episodes ==
Series	Episodes	Originally released	
Series	Episodes	First released	Last released
1	6	5 November 2014	10 December 2014
2	6	3 February 2016	9 March 2016
3	6	19 September 2018	24 October 2018
4	6	5 February 2020	11 March 2020

=== Series 1 (2014) ===
No. overall	No. in series	Title	Directed by	Written by	Original release date	Aus. viewers (millions)
1	1	"Episode 1"	Beck Cole and Craig Anderson	Jon Bell, Steven Oliver, Elizabeth Wymarra, Nakkiah Lui and Bjorn Stewart	5 November 2014	0.35
2	2	"Episode 2"	Beck Cole and Craig Anderson	Jon Bell, Steven Oliver, Nakkiah Lui, Elizabeth Wymarra, Moses Nelliman & Michael Passi	12 November 2014	0.35
3	3	"Episode 3"	Beck Cole and Craig Anderson	Steven Oliver, Jon Bell, Elizabeth Wymarra, Nakkiah Lui and Bjorn Stewart	19 November 2014	0.27
4	4	"Episode 4"	Beck Cole and Craig Anderson	Nakkiah Lui, Steven Oliver, Bjorn Stewart, Jon Bell and Elizabeth Wymarra	26 November 2014	0.31
5	5	"Episode 5"	Beck Cole and Craig Anderson	Steven Oliver, Jon Bell, Nakkiah Lui, Moses Nelliman, Elizabeth Wymarra and Bjorn Stewart	3 December 2014	N/A
6	6	"Episode 6"	Beck Cole and Craig Anderson	Steven Oliver, Nakkiah Lui, Jon Bell, Bjorn Stewart and Elizabeth Wymarra	10 December 2014	N/A

=== Series 2 (2016) ===
No. overall	No. in series	Title	Directed by	Written by	Original release date	Aus. viewers (millions)
7	1	"Episode 1"	Beck Cole and Erica Glynn	Adam Briggs, Steven Oliver, Nakkiah Lui, Karen Edwards, Andy Williams and Kiara Milera	3 February 2016	0.58
8	2	"Episode 2"	Beck Cole and Erica Glynn	Adam Briggs, Steven Oliver, Nakkiah Lui, Paul Ryan and Kiara Milera	10 February 2016	0.36
9	3	"Episode 3"	Beck Cole and Erica Glynn	Adam Briggs, Steven Oliver, Nakkiah Lui and Kiara Milera	17 February 2016	0.34
10	4	"Episode 4"	Beck Cole and Erica Glynn	Nakkiah Lui, Adam Briggs, Steven Oliver, Ian Zaro, Dylan River and Kiara Milera	24 February 2016	N/A
11	5	"Episode 5"	Beck Cole and Erica Glynn	Nakkiah Lui, Steven Oliver, Ian Zaro and Kiara Milera	2 March 2016	0.28
12	6	"Episode 6"	Beck Cole and Erica Glynn	Steven Oliver, Nakkiah Lui, Paul Ryan, Ian Zaro, Adam Briggs and Kiara Milera	9 March 2016	0.33

=== Series 3 (2018) ===
No. overall	No. in series	Title	Directed by	Written by	Original release date	Aus. viewers (millions)
13	1	"Episode 1"	Unknown	Unknown	1 January 2018	N/A
14	2	"Episode 2"	Unknown	Unknown	1 January 2018	N/A
15	3	"Episode 3"	Unknown	Unknown	1 January 2018	N/A
16	4	"Episode 4"	Unknown	Unknown	1 January 2018	N/A
17	5	"Episode 5"	Unknown	Unknown	1 January 2018	N/A
18	6	"Episode 6"	Unknown	Unknown	1 January 2018	N/A

=== Series 4 (2020) ===
No. overall	No. in series	Title	Directed by	Written by	Original release date	Aus. viewers (millions)
19	1	"Episode 1"	Unknown	Unknown	1 January 2020	N/A
20	2	"Episode 2"	Unknown	Unknown	1 January 2020	N/A
21	3	"Episode 3"	Unknown	Unknown	1 January 2020	N/A
22	4	"Episode 4"	Unknown	Unknown	1 January 2020	N/A
23	5	"Episode 5"	Unknown	Unknown	1 January 2020	N/A
24	6	"Episode 6"	Unknown	Unknown	1 January 2020	N/A

== Broadcast ==
Prior to the premiere of Black Comedy in November, ABC released a sketch, "Race Card Platinum" on the Friday Night Crack Up on 10 October 2014 as part of the ABC's "MentalAs" campaign to raise money and awareness for mental health issues. The sketch was introduced by series writer/actor Elizabeth Wymarra and series actor Aaron Fa'aoso and featured actor, Kyas Sherriff in a mock-advertising campaign for the fictitious "Race Card Platinum".

The series first screened on ABC on 5 November 2014. A second series screened in 2016, a third in 2018, and a fourth in 2020.
