= Secret City (TV series) =

- Genre: Political drama; Spy thriller
- Based on: The Marmalade Files and The Mandarin Code by Chris Uhlmann and Steve Lewis
- Written by: Matt Cameron; Belinda Chayko; Greg Waters; Elise McCredie; Angela Betzien
- Directed by: Emma Freeman; Tony Krawitz; Daniel Nettheim
- Starring: Anna Torv; Jacki Weaver; Daniel Wyllie; Alex Dimitriades; Damon Herriman; Danielle Cormack; Don Hany; Rob Collins
- Composer: David Bridie
- Country of origin: Australia
- Original language: English
- No. of seasons: 2
- No. of episodes: 12

Production
- Executive producers: Penny Chapman; Penny Win; Carly Heaton
- Producers: Joanna Werner; Stephen Corvini
- Production locations: Canberra, Australian Capital Territory
- Cinematography: Mark Wareham; Garry Phillips
- Running time: 46–52 minutes
- Production companies: Foxtel; Matchbox Pictures

Original release
- Network: Fox Showcase; Foxtel; Netflix
- Release: 5 June 2016 – 4 March 2019

Secret City is an Australian political thriller television series based on the best-selling novels The Marmalade Files, The Mandarin Code, and The Shadow Game by Chris Uhlmann and Steve Lewis. It premiered on Foxtel's Showcase on 5 June 2016 and on Netflix internationally on 26 June 2018. The series is produced by Matchbox Pictures and Foxtel.

A sequel to the series called Secret City: Under the Eagle was green-lit in February 2018. It aired on 4 March 2019 in Australia and launched worldwide on Netflix on 6 March 2019. It was later removed from Netflix in March 2026.

The sequel storyline is a departure from the books written by Uhlmann and Lewis, who joined the series as story consultants.

== Synopsis ==
=== Secret City ===
Beneath the placid facade of Canberra, amidst rising tension between China and the United States, press gallery journalist Harriet Dunkley (Anna Torv) forces her way closer to the truth, uncovering a set of interlocked conspiracies which threaten her career and her life and endanger the freedom of every Australian.

=== Secret City: Under the Eagle ===
The story picks up with Harriet unwittingly ensnared in a military and political cover-up with Catriona Bailey's (Jacki Weaver) fingerprints all over it. Harriet's search for the truth leads her back into Canberra's corridors of power, this time working for a maverick Independent MP. What she unearths is a military program so secret even the Prime Minister knows nothing of its existence.

== Cast ==
=== Recurring cast ===
- Anna Torv as Harriet Dunkley, a former investigative journalist for The Daily Nation, now Senior Media Advisor to Karen Koutoufides
- Jacki Weaver as Catriona Bailey, Attorney-General and Minister for Justice, later Minister for Home Affairs
- Marcus Graham as Andrew "Griff" Griffiths, Chief of Staff to the Minister of Home Affairs, former Senior Political Correspondent for The Daily Nation
- Sacha Horler as Ludie Sypek, host of a SKY political panel show, former Chief of Staff to previous Prime Minister Martin Toohey
- Justin Smith as William Vaughn, Director-General of the Australian Signals Directorate
- Aleks Mikic as Thomas Maher, a junior analyst in the Australian Signals Directorate

=== Secret City ===
- Daniel Wyllie as Malcolm Paxton, Minister for Defence
- Alex Dimitriades as Charles Dancer, Australian Security Intelligence Organisation (ASIO) officer
- Damon Herriman as Kim Gordon, a senior analyst in the Australian Signals Directorate. Originally married to Harriet Dunkley, but was divorced by Dunkley after transitioning into a woman
- Alan Dale as Martin Toohey, Australian Prime Minister
- Mekhi Phifer as Brent Moreton, US Ambassador to Australia
- Eugenia Yuan as Weng Meigui, wife of the Chinese Ambassador
- Matt Zeremes as Sean Brimmer, Senior Constable, Australian Federal Police
- Huw Higginson as Gus Reardon, Editor of The Daily Nation
- Miranda Tapsell as Sasha Rose, a cadet journalist at The Daily Nation
- Brenna Harding as Cassie, Australian National University student
- Benedict Samuel as Felix Crawford, lecturer and tutor at Australian National University
- Sean Taylor as Paul Wheeler, Director-General of the Australian Security Intelligence Organisation
- Kate Mulvany as Veronica "Ronnie" Bordoni, Chief of Staff to the Minister of Defence
- David Roberts as General Ross McAuliffe, Chief of the Defence Force
- Anni Finsterer as Vice Admiral Joanna Hartzig, Vice Chief of the Defence Force
- Max Brown as Kevin Dang, boyfriend of Cassie and Australian National University student
- Charles Wu as Qiu, Australian National University student
- Kimie Tsukakoshi as Ivy Chen

=== Secret City: Under the Eagle ===
- Danielle Cormack as Karen Koutoufides, Independent MP for Wakefield, South Australia
- Laura Gordon as Caroline "Cal" Treloar, Drone Pilot, Royal Australian Air Force
- Rob Collins as Lieutenant Joseph Sullivan
- Don Hany as Ewan Garrity, Australian Prime Minister
- Andrew McFarlane as Air Chief Marshal Wes Lockwood, Chief of the Defence Force
- Joel Tobeck as Jim Hellier, Minister for Defence, later Acting Minister for Home Affairs
- Louisa Mignone as Mina Al Masi, friend and former cellmate of Harriet Dunkley
- Robert Rabiah as Sami Al Masi, Canberra businessman and husband of Mina
- Tom Wren as Alex Berezin, a lobbyist for Vanguard Energy
- Renee Lim as Major Helen Wu, Australian Army and wife of William Vaughn
- Benedict Hardie as Declan Boyd, assistant to Karen Koutoufides
- Michael Denkha as Michael Lavelle, CEO of South East Asia Operations for Trebuchet
- Di Adams as Gaelene Curtis, Liberal Party Leader of the Opposition and MP from Victoria
- Christopher Kirby as Kip Buchanan, US Ambassador to Australia
- Frederick Du Rietz as Robbie Lambert, lone survivor of the Davoren Park explosion
- Dalip Sondhi as Yasir Younis, Pakistan Ambassador to Australia
- Rhondda Findleton as Madeline Stenders, Director-General of the Australian Security Intelligence Organisation
- Rob MacPherson as Richard Gascoigne, United States Secretary of Defense
- Greg Eccleston as Floor Manager 1, crew member on Sky News Australia show Inside World
- Fiona Press as Sylvie Dunkley, mother of Harriet Dunkley
- Rahel Romahn as Nakeesh

== Series overview ==
Series	Episodes	Originally released	
Series	Episodes	First released	Last released
1	6	5 June 2016	3 July 2016
2	6	4 March 2019	

== Episodes ==
=== Secret City (2016) ===
No. overall	No. in series	Title	Directed by	Written by	Original release date	Australian viewers
1	1	"A Donation to the Struggle"	Emma Freeman	Matt Cameron	5 June 2016	80,000
A choirgirl, Sabine Hobbs, had won a scholarship to China, but in Beijing she shouted "Free Tibet" and self-immolated. Chinese officials quickly put out the fire with blankets, so Sabine survives but with third-degree burns. Later she is apparently sentenced to 20 years imprisonment for terrorism. When political journalist Harriet Dunkley sees the gutted body of a young man washed up on the lakeshore she suspects a conspiracy. Her newspaper thinks she's tilting at another windmill, the police stonewall, her Government sources are silent and a senior contact within Australian intelligence firmly warns her off. But Harriet discovers a link between Sabine Hobbs and the dead boy, Max Dalgetty. It's revealed that they attended the same Chinese choir at the ANU, but there is no record of Dalgetty anywhere. Defence minister Malcolm Paxton lands in hot water with justice minister and attorney general Catriona Bailey over the deployment of ships with the American fleet. Meanwhile, the new US ambassador to Australia arrives in Canberra, and Lloyd Rankin, Paxton's head of mission in Beijing in 1992, turns up dead. Dalgetty's murder is closed, blamed on inter agency faults and his body is cremated.
2	2	"The Watchers"	Emma Freeman	Belinda Chayko	5 June 2016	80,000
With Rankin dead, the police question Harriet as she was the last person he called. The conspiracy may be hidden deep, but it involves those who are powerful, ruthless and with a great deal at stake, but Harriet won't stop no matter how deadly her quest becomes. Kim Gordon risks her life when she decides to steal and download a confidential file, dubbed Vinegar Hill. She goes on the run and asks to meet Harriet. However, Kim gets stuck and is later found dead, her body identified by Harriet. Paxton hands his arrest picture to Prime Minister Martin Toohey, angering him and Bailey calls for Paxton's resignation. In a turn of events, the Chinese ambassador steps forward and clarifies the picture with it being a case of mistaken identify. Toohey keeps Paxton on as defence minister, but the deployment of Australian ships still goes ahead despite Paxton's plan of having ships built in their homeland. We see Sabine Hobbs in a hospital room, and that she is blind from the burns. She is told that she is in a Chinese prison, but unknown to Sabine, it is an Australian woman speaking Chinese.
3	3	"Beware the Jabberwock"	Emma Freeman	Belinda Chayko & Greg Waters	12 June 2016	74,000
Kim's funeral is held, and Harriet struggles to decipher a cryptic message she left behind. She enlists the help of Sabine Hobbs's fellow student Cassie, whose boyfriend, Chinese citizen Kevin Dang, is revealed to have been a friend on Max Dalgetty. Dang unexpectedly announces his return to China, but doesn't explain why. Paxton rebuffs Bailey's proposed bill on centralising Australian intelligence agencies, but she leaves him no choice but accept it. Later, he learns that an Australian ship has collided with a Chinese patrol ship, warning her that she might now have caused a conflict with China. Paxton also manages to secure continued contact between Sabine and her mother. Harriet's love interest Felix Crawford offers to help her decrypt a chip Kim left, but a warrant is soon put out for his arrest. Harriet confides in ASIO agent Charles Dancer, and they arrive just when Crawford is arrested.
4	4	"Falling Hard"	Emma Freeman	Belinda Chayko	19 June 2016	72,000
On his way to pick up his son from the airport, Paxton learns of a sophisticated cyber attack against the country's air traffic communications and hurries to Parliament House. For thirteen minutes, the communications are down and planes are out in holding patterns. The US assist with a communications ship and avoid a collision between two planes. In the aftermath, Paxton ends his affair with the wife of the Chinese ambassador, while also juggling with his son's presence. Dancer warns Harriet that a lot of people are after her due to her investigation. Cassie approaches her with Qiu, who reveals that they and Dalgetty worked in a group with connections on mainland China to fight human rights violations in Tibet. Before their second meeting, MSS agent Zheng and his men corner Qiu. Toohey returns from Japan, and together with Bailey, announce the Safer Australia bill, which Paxton also has changed his views on. Harriet admits to her boss that the government fooled them. While rowing, Harriet is shot at from a distance, but manages to make it safely to shore.
5	5	"Ghosts in the Machine"	Emma Freeman	Matt Cameron	26 June 2016	72,000
Following the shooting by the river, Harriet strengthens her personal security. Qiu is brought to an undisclosed location by Zhang, where other Chinese dissidents are being kept, but manages to escape. He flees to Harriet's residence, where she patches him up. She has Sasha keep him at her place and asks Bailey to give Qiu asylum. Paxton dismisses general McAuliffe as chief of defence after discovering that he was responsible for shutting down the Richmond base during the aircraft communications incident. He nominates vice admiral Joanna Hartzig as his successor. His action meets protest from the American ambassador. Zheng rediscovers Qiu and hurts Sasha in the process, but is stopped by Harriet and Dancer. Sabine begs to be taken outside to the fresh air. Sabine asks her escort, the same Australian woman speaking Chinese, to describe the scenery. The surroundings are green and full of trees, but the escort lies and says the area is barren, treeless, and surrounded by barbed wire. Then Sabine hears a bird chirping just before she is brought back inside. Harriet breaks the dissident story, to much denial from the Chinese embassy and Australian government. She is brought before ASD Director William Vaughn, serving as a warning of her investigative tactics is to be repeated. Dalgetty's mother reveals to her that Max died years ago, and that his friend Dan White used his name. Bailey's Safer Australia bill is passed, and it's revealed that she worked with the Chinese. She also advises the ambassador's wife to keep a close eye on Paxton.
6	6	"The Light on the Hill"	Emma Freeman	Matt Cameron	3 July 2016	68,000
Sabine Hobbs is finally handed back to Australia, although to an Australian women's prison. But becomes suspicious to her time in capture, sharing her suspicions with Harriet, deducing that for the last period she wasn't captive in China. Sabine explains that she heard a magpie, a bird not found in Heilongjiang where she was told she had been imprisoned. After talks with the paper's higher ups, they decide for Harriet to publish the watered down version of Sabine's case. Harriet instead manages to get the full detailed version to be published. Having breached the Safer Australia bill, a warrant is put out for her arrest, while Dancer asks her to leave the country and arranges a new passport for her and a plane ticket. Harriet visits Sabine one last time, who identifies the voice she heard while captive, revealed to be that of Dancer. Sean Brimmer searches Kim's motel room and discovers the Vinegar Hill file, which reveals that Dancer arranged Sabine's captive transfer to Australia. Bringing Dancer to Kim's last location, Harriet confronts him with her deductions, including that he killed Kim; before fleeing. Dancer manages to stop her, but Brimmer arrives and shoots him. Weng is recalled to Beijing, but her death is ensued by Bailey in a staged car accident. She also reveals surveillance photos of Paxton and Weng's meetings, ensuring his resignation. In turn, Paxton reveals that he knows she was a Chinese spy. Harriet is arrested, and Paxton offers to cover her defence costs, which she accepts.

=== Secret City: Under the Eagle (2019) ===
All episodes were released on streaming platform Foxtel on 4 March 2019.

No. overall	No. in series	Title	Directed by	Written by	Original release date	Australian viewers
7	1	"Run Little Rabbit"	Tony Krawitz	Matt Cameron	4 March 2019	N/A
Harriet Dunkley is out on parole and eager to leave the swamp of Canberra politics behind. An explosion rocks the quiet neighbourhood of Davoren Park in Adelaide, leaving sole survivor 16 year old Robbie Lambert. Harriet's cellmate, Mina Almasi, receives classified information from someone dubbed “The Rabbit”, revealing a cover-up of her family's death in 2003 in Iraq, orchestrated by Catriona Bailey, who is now Minister for Home Affairs. Harriet goes on record on television despite prior reservations. Bailey gives in to talk to Almasi, but has her chief of staff meet her instead, threatening her and her husband with prior criminal activities. Mina instead meets Bailey at random and warns her that she knows what she did. The Australian Signals Directorate discover Robbie's web history and arrests him shortly after his family's funeral. Bailey, through Chief of Defence Wes Lockwood, orders lieutenant Joseph Sullivan to cover up the explosion site, while also tracking a now rogue drone pilot, Caroline “Cal” Treloar. Mina heads to the Australian-American Memorial to meet “The Rabbit”, but instead discovers the body of Bailey. Harriet asks her to leave town, and gets her phone. Deciding to leave herself, she stops in her tracks when “The Rabbit” shows surveillance footage of Mina from the memorial on her phone.
8	2	"The War Zone"	Tony Krawitz	Belinda Chayko	4 March 2019	N/A
Following the death of Bailey, Prime Minister Ewan Garrity appoints defence minister Jim Hellier acting minister for home affairs. ASIO and ASD inform him and Hellier that Robbie Lambert had correspondence with the radical left group The Collective, suspecting another event. Harriet starts working as a media advisor for independent MP Karen Koutoufides from Wakefield. Harriet asks Mina's husband Sami to pressure Thomas Maher to assist her with getting access to the redacted file regarding Mina's family. While not getting it, she discovers a suspicious phone log listing many calls between Bailey and Lockwood the day of the explosion. Robbie is questioned by ASIO and denies involvement with The Collective and the bombing. When Harriet visits him in detention, he holds her hostage before being tased. Garrity calls in the Pakistani ambassador regarding the captivity of Australian soldier Gavin Markson. The video from Harriet's visit is leaked to the press, and Hellier names Mina the suspect of Bailey's murder. Treloar evades captivity and arrives in Canberra, confiding in Lockwood. Harriet visits the Houli family, the Lambert's neighbours. Their son Danny shows her footage he took of the Lambert house during the explosion. Upon further analysis, Harriet concludes that the bomb came from the sky.
9	3	"Pale Horse"	Tony Krawitz	Matt Cameron & Angela Betzien	4 March 2019	N/A
Treloar is brought in for questioning by ASIO, confronted with the events that transpired over Davoren Park, revealed to have been due to a technical failure. Harriet shows Daniel Houli's missile footage to Koutoufides, who shows it to Hellier. ASIO searches the Houli residence and confiscates their computers, doing the same for Harriet. William Vaughn and ASIO Director Madeline Stenders questions her about Mina's whereabouts. Koutoufides leaks the missile footage to the media, causing public outrage. Mina asks Harriet to deliver a birthday present to her daughter. At the party, her daughter discovers a hidden gun and Mina arrives at the same time as ASIO to arrest her. Prime Minister Garrity discovers the existence of a classified military program, which were testing drones together with the US, dubbed “Pale Horse” near Woomera. Outraged, he declares that the program will be suspended. Vaughn worries he might be comprised due to his wife, major Helen Wu, is gambling and given money by Sami Almasi in return for military weapons trading. He manages stop their next delivery. With the missile footage clearing Robbie of suspicion, Koutoufides gets him released. Hellier reveals the details of the military program to the public.
10	4	"Broken Bird"	Daniel Nettheim	Elise McCredie	4 March 2019	N/A
United States Secretary of Defense Richard Gascoigne arrives in Canberra and advises Garrity against shutting down the Pale Horse program, but Garrity rules it out until the responsible drone for the Davoren Park bombing has been found. After questioning Helen Wu, Harriet spots Treloar and informs Sullivan of her appearance. Lockwood later entrusts Sullivan to look after Treloar. The location of the missing drone is eventually discovered. Michael Lavelle, the CEO of the drone manufacturer's South East Asia Operations, reveals that their investigation has traced the drone's hacking to an IP in Islamabad, which in return belonged to the Inter-Service Intelligence, the Pakistani intelligence agency. Treloar escapes Sullivan's hotel room and steals Harriet's credit card to take a cab to a friend, John Smith, from whom she takes back a USB drive to download the drone data. Harriet asks Vaughn to unlock a classified file from Bailey's computer, which reveals the location of a safety house in Pakistan, which she suspects Bailey gave to the Chinese. Harriet recommends Koutoufides take a seat in the Intelligence and Security Committee, but Garrity is reluctant at first before accepting it, telling her to be firm on her questions about the drone case. Harriet tracks Treloar's location to Smith's house, where she discovers his dead body.
11	5	"For Whom the Bell Tolls"	Daniel Nettheim	Belinda Chayko	4 March 2019	N/A
Vaughn asks Thomas to investigate the file that implicated Bailey knowing the location of the safe house in Pakistan. Treloar unexpectedly appears at Harriet's mother's house and reiterates her demands to meet prime minister Garrity. Koutoufides takes her seat in the Intelligence and Security Committee and goes out hard against the drone manufacturer and Lockwood, questioning the legitimacy of the evidence pointed at Pakistani intelligence, and she asks for it to be certified by independent sources. She also receives pictures from her night out with Vanguard Energy lobbyist Alex Berezin, which makes her worried that she may be compromised. A closer investigation by her assistant into Vanguard reveals that it's a mere shell company belonging to Trebuchet. Harriet eventually discovers that “John Smith” is actually Connor McPherson, a fellow soldier who served with Treloar. In an effort to prove that the Americans knew Bailey was a Chinese spy, Vaughn bugs the ambassador's office and an aircraft museum, where the ambassador meets an Afghan informant. Thomas uses Vaughn's home surveillance against him, ensuring his downfall. Treloar's demand to meet Garrity eventually goes through. Before the meeting, she confesses to Harriet that she was responsible for the Davoren Park attack, which was meant to send a message to the Australian people to care more about the innocent victims of the war. She also reveals that McPherson built an alternative drone which she swapped on the runway, and gives Harriet a flash drive with evidence of it. Garrity is only present through a body cam on Sullivan, her ex-husband; Treloar reiterates her statement of evidence and is shot by Lockwood's men as she reaches for something. Lavelle meets with Berezin and asks him to clear up one more loose end.
12	6	"Two Cheers for Democracy"	Daniel Nettheim	Matt Cameron	4 March 2019	N/A
Info about Pakistan being responsible for the Davoren Park attack is leaked to the media, causing mass protest at their embassy. Vaughn sends his wife to rehab and denies knowledge of Treloar's flash drive when Harriet asks him. Her house and mother's house are ransacked while Treloar's flash drive is missing; Koutoufides urges her to find it. The prisoner Gavin Markson is rescued by a join American-Australian team and brought back home, but in a severe condition. Vaughn hands his resignation to Garrity, who postpones until after the committee vote about Davoren Park. Harriet asks Vaughn to unredact the Ar-Rutbah coverup, which he reluctantly does. The document confirms Mina's suspicions about her family being blamed for an attack and weapons were planted, with it being signed by Bailey, then defence minister, and led by Lockwood. She confronts him with the document and asks for Treloar's flash drive, which he only gives up when Berezin shows up, who also admits to killing McPherson. Harriet hands the drive to Koutoufides for her to bring up in the committee, but she abstains after “The Rabbit” sends her surveillance photos of her son. Harriet turns to Garrity, who accepts the reality, but thinks it shouldn't be him who reveals the drive's content. He does however promise to set down a royal commission to investigate once it has become public. Harriet enlists Vaughn's help one last time to make the drive public. Mina is released from prison, and Harriet tells her that she knows that she did in fact kill Bailey all along.

== Reception ==
=== Awards and nominations ===
Year	Award	Category	Recipient	Outcome
2019	AACTA Awards	Best Male New Talent	Frederick Du Rietz	Nominated
2017	Logie Awards	Most Outstanding Actress	Anna Torv	Won
2017	Logie Awards	Most Outstanding Supporting Actor	Damon Herriman	Won
2017	Australian Directors Guild Awards	Best Direction in a Television Drama Series	Emma Freeman	Won
2016	AACTA Awards	Best Guest or Supporting Actor in a Television Drama	Damon Herriman	Won
2016	Screen Music Awards, Australia	Best Music for a Mini-Series or Telemovie	David Bridie	Nominated
