= The Sapphires (film) =

2012 film directed by Wayne Blair

- Theatrical release poster
- Directed by: Wayne Blair
- Screenplay by: Keith Thompson; Tony Briggs
- Based on: The Sapphires by Tony Briggs
- Produced by: Rosemary Blight; Kylie Du Fresne
- Starring: Chris O'Dowd; Deborah Mailman; Jessica Mauboy; Shari Sebbens; Miranda Tapsell; Tory Kittles; Eka Darville
- Cinematography: Warwick Thornton
- Edited by: Dany Cooper
- Music by: Cezary Skubiszewski
- Production company: Goalpost Pictures
- Distributed by: Hopscotch Films
- Release dates: 19 May 2012 (Cannes); 9 August 2012 (Australia); 22 March 2013 (United States)
- Running time: 103 minutes
- Country: Australia
- Language: English
- Budget: $8–10 million
- Box office: $20.4 million

The Sapphires is a 2012 Australian musical comedy-drama film based on the 2004 stage play The Sapphires by Tony Briggs, which is loosely based on a real-life 1960s girl group that included Briggs' mother and aunt. The film is directed by Wayne Blair and written by Keith Thompson and Briggs.

The Sapphires is about four Yorta Yorta (Aboriginal Australian) women: Gail (Deborah Mailman), Julie (Jessica Mauboy), Kay (Shari Sebbens), and Cynthia (Miranda Tapsell); who are discovered by a talent scout (Chris O'Dowd), form a music group named The Sapphires, and travel to Vietnam in 1968 to sing for troops during the war.

Production began in 2010, with the casting of the four members of The Sapphires. Filming took place in and around Albury, Australia and Ho Chi Minh City, Vietnam during August and September 2011. The Sapphires made its world premiere at the 2012 Cannes Film Festival on 19 May 2012 during its out-of-competition screenings, was theatrically released in Australia on 9 August, and received a limited release in the United States on 22 March 2013.

== Plot ==
In 1968 Australia, Gail and Cynthia head into town to sing at a talent contest. Their younger sister Julie is forbidden to go, partly because of her youth and partly because she already has a child, but she bribes her neighbour to take her to the contest. An alcoholic Irish talent scout, Dave Lovelace, is scolded by his boss for being late despite him sleeping in his car that is near work. Despite being the best act in the contest, the girls not only do not win, but are told to leave. Dave recognises their talent and is told that the troops need singers for Vietnam. After presenting these facts to the skeptical singers, Dave makes a call and tells them they have been granted a spot to audition in Melbourne.

Back at their home, their mother is reluctant, but the girls argue that this might be their once-in-a-lifetime opportunity. Dave tells their father that he will protect them with his life. Advised by their grandmother, they meet up with their cousin Kay, who had been living in Melbourne for 10 years after the government took her from her family because she was half-white (as part of the policy now referred to as Stolen Generations). She initially rejects the offer to join them, but soon changes her mind and meets them at their uncle's place. After days of practicing their moves, they are about to audition when Julie gives Cynthia a letter from her fiancé: he's calling off their engagement. Despite that, the audition is a success and Kay comes up with the group's name, The Sapphires, by looking at Cynthia's engagement ring.

The Sapphires are a success with the crowds, but infighting among the women threatens to tear the group apart: Gail acts as the group's overbearing matriarch; Cynthia begins a relationship with a member of their military escort in the aftermath of her break-up; Kay struggles with her multi-ethnic identity while being courted by an Army medic; and Julie has difficulty processing the reality of war. Dave and Gail begin to show feelings for each other, but his reckless behaviour and a personal secret push Gail's patience to the limit.

The group travels without military escort to a venue where a renowned U.S. talent scout will be in attendance, primarily to see Julie, the group's one great voice. Angry about these events, Cynthia vamps during the first show, drinking with some of the men, and is told by Gail she will not be allowed to go on again. Before the next show begins, Dave hands Gail her a letter and tells her to open it later; they are about to kiss when the base is attacked. After getting Gail and Cynthia to a helicopter, Dave goes back to find the others, and Gail sees him get shot. Kay and Julie are able to leave on Kay's boyfriend's med-evac, where a dying white soldier makes a racist comment to Kay's boyfriend Robbie as he tries to attend to the white soldier's mortal wounds.

Safely in Saigon, Gail reads Dave's letter and realises that he wanted to propose to her. The women are asked to perform that evening following the assassination of Martin Luther King, Jr., with Gail singing lead in the aftermath of her loss. Kay's boyfriend arrives to take Gail to a local hospital where Dave is recovering. The Sapphires return to Australia and Gail and Dave announce to her family that they plan to marry. The Sapphires give a joyous performance for their friends and family in the yard of their home.

== Cast ==
- Chris O'Dowd as Dave
- Deborah Mailman as Gail
- Jessica Mauboy as Julie
- Shari Sebbens as Kay
- Miranda Tapsell as Cynthia
- Tory Kittles as Robby
- Eka Darville as Hendo
- Kylie Belling as Geraldine
- Judith Lucy as Merle
- Georgina Haig as Glynis
- Rhys Muldoon as Uncle Ed
- Meyne Wyatt as Jimmy Middleton
- Don Battee as Myron Ritchie

Tanika Lonesborough, Miah Madden, Nioka Brennan and Ava Jean Miller-Porter also play Gail, Julie, Kay and Cynthia as children; and Carlin Briggs plays the childhood Jimmy.

== Historical basis ==
There was an all-female Australian Aboriginal singing group named The Sapphires in the 1960s, although there were three members: Laurel Robinson (mother of screenwriter Tony Briggs), Beverly Briggs, and her sister Naomi Mayers. They performed at hotels, pubs, cabarets, clubs, parties, army barracks and universities around Melbourne.

When they were invited to Vietnam to perform for the troops, Briggs and Mayers declined, as they were against the war, so Robinson enlisted her sister Lois Peeler to join her. In Vietnam, the duo of Robinson and Peeler performed backing vocals for a New Zealand Māori band they had performed with in Melbourne. It was this Māori band who introduced them to soul music; the character of Dave Lovelace, portrayed in the film by Chris O'Dowd, did not exist. Director Wayne Blair, talking about the creation of the Lovelace character, said "That's where we went a bit Argo". Tony Briggs said in an interview in The Age in 2004 that he found it "liberating as a writer to expand the number of characters", as it gave the story "richer dynamics".

== Production ==
Based on Tony Briggs' 2004 play of the same name commissioned by and debuted at Melbourne Theatre Company, the film was first announced in June 2010. The screenplay was co-written by Briggs and Keith Thompson. Filming primarily took place in New South Wales, at Albury, (and its surrounding towns Corowa, Howlong, Culcairn, Henty and Morven), with additional shooting taking place in Windsor, Camden, Summerhill, Newtown, and Canal Road Studios in Leichhardt, between August and September 2011. The rest of the film's production was moved to Ho Chi Minh City and area in Vietnam, for a limited shoot.

=== Casting ===
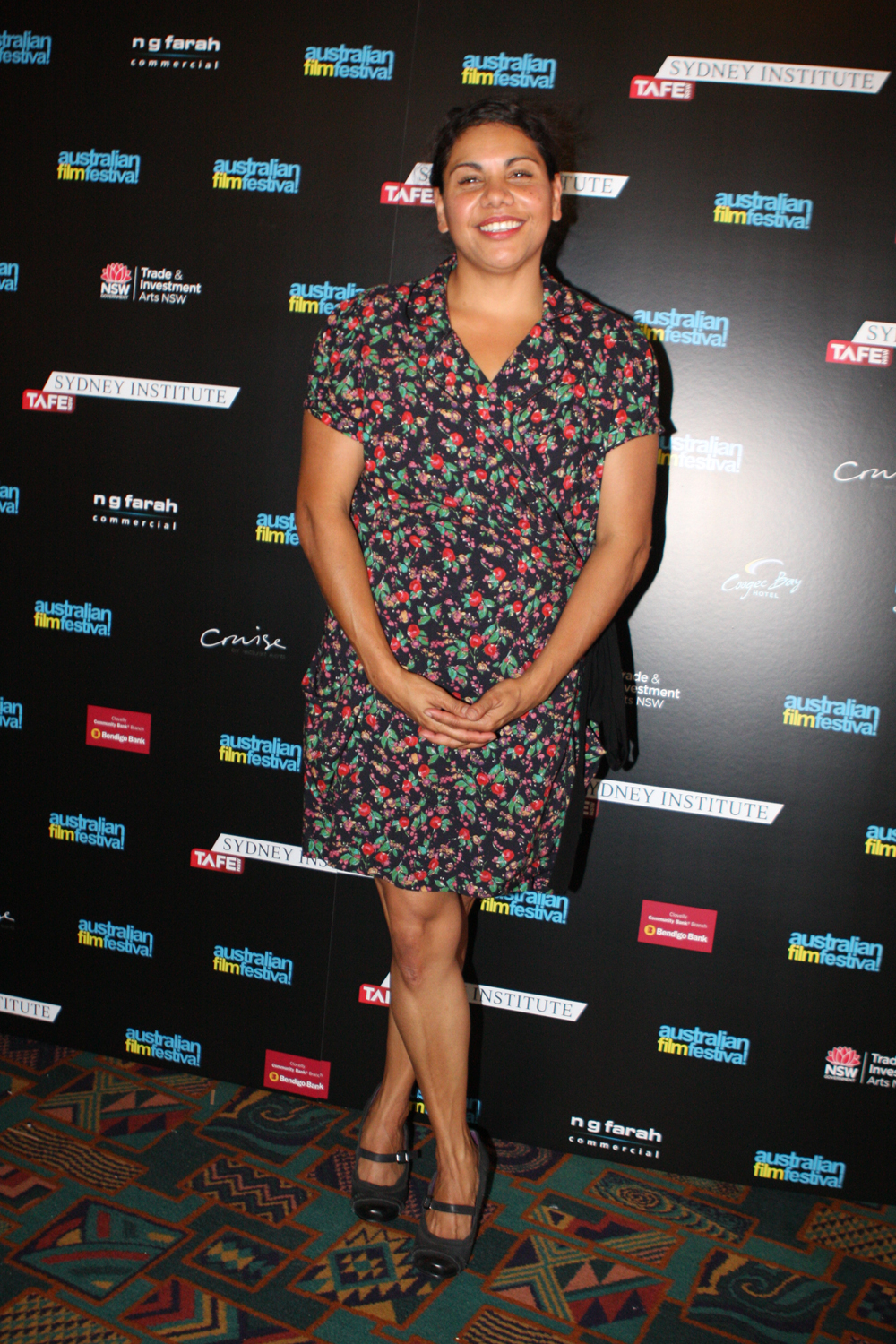
Deborah Mailman, who played Cynthia McCrae in the original 2004 play, stars as Gail McCrae in the film.

On 2 June 2010, a press release announced that an open casting call had begun for The Sapphires, and that Goalpost Pictures Australia were searching for "four young Indigenous women, aged 16–28, to play the leading roles of the four members of [the title singing group]". The audition process involved submitting an audition tape to the casting website by 31 July 2010. Australian singer Casey Donovan, who had starred as Cynthia McCrae in the musical's 2010 production, auditioned for that part, but was unsuccessful, with the role instead going to newcomer Miranda Tapsell. Deborah Mailman, who also starred as Cynthia in the original 2004 production of the musical, landed the role of Gail McCrae, and Jessica Mauboy joined the film, being cast as Gail's sister Julie. In August 2011, the roles of all four group members were officially announced, when another newcomer, Shari Sebbens, joined the cast as Kay McCrae. Chris O'Dowd was added to the film, playing the role of Dave, who discovers The Sapphires.

== Soundtrack ==
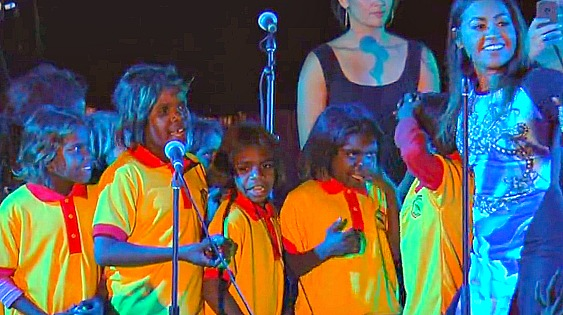
Mauboy performing "Ngarra Burra Ferra" at the 2013 Mbantua Festival in Alice Springs, Northern Territory with Aboriginal Australian students from Yipirinya State Primary School, of which Mauboy is the official ambassador.

The original soundtrack was released on 27 July 2012 by Sony Music. It features the vocals of Jessica Mauboy, Jade MacRae, Lou Bennett, Juanita Tippins and Darren Percival, with Mauboy singing in ten of the sixteen songs. An original track called "Gotcha", co-written by Mauboy, Ilan Kidron, and Louis Schoorl, was released as a single on 13 July. Two weeks after its chart debut, The Sapphires soundtrack hit number one on the ARIA Album Chart and the ARIA Australian Albums Chart.

== Release ==
The film had its world premiere on 19 May at the 2012 Cannes Film Festival, at the midnight out-of-competition screening. Following the premiere, the audience in attendance gave the cast and crew a ten-minute standing ovation. It premiered in Australia at the Melbourne International Film Festival on 2 August, with its cinematic release on 9 August, distributed by Hopscotch Films. Entertainment One handled distribution in the United Kingdom, Ireland, and Canada, while Lusomundo, Diaphana, and Lev Films released the film in Portugal, France, and Israel, respectively. The Weinstein Company bought the rights to distribute the film in the United States and other countries.

=== Home media ===
The US release of the DVD attracted controversy as the result of the design for the DVD's cover. The artwork placed actor Chris O'Dowd prominently in the foreground, with the four female stars appearing in the background and coloured with a blue wash. The decision was described as both sexist and racist, with O'Dowd describing the decision as "ill-judged, insensitive and everything the film wasn't". Anchor Bay expressed regret for any "unintentional upset caused" and said different artwork was being considered for future orders.

== Reception ==
=== Box office ===
In Australia, the film was the highest-earning Australian film on its opening weekend, grossing $2,320,000 from 275 cinemas. News.com.au said it was the strongest first weekend for an Australian-made film since Tomorrow, When the War Began, which earned $3,860,000 upon its 2010 release. As of 31 October 2012, the film had grossed AU$14,215,596 at the Australian box office.

The film was far less successful in international markets than in its Australian release, with roughly $5 million from all international releases combined versus over $14 million in its Australian release alone.

In France, the film opened at #13 with just 35,786 admissions from 162 screens over its first week (25,847 over five days). It was dubbed "Le Flop" by French box office website Le Box Office Pour Les Nuls. In its first major English-language opening outside of Australia, the UK, the film opened at #7 and to a little under 25% of the box office it earned in its Australian opening weekend, on a roughly similar number of screens (279 vs. 233). The film exited UK cinemas after just 5 weeks in release with a final box office take of £680,643, equivalent to around AU$1m. The UK final box office takings were less than 1/14 of the film's Australian final box office takings. In its United States release, where the film only appeared in the top 20 for one weekend (at #19, 5–7 April 2013), the film completed its run with just under $2.5m, and releases in Germany and the Netherlands yielded under $100,000 each.

=== Critical response ===
The Sapphires received positive reviews from Cannes, dubbed as the Australian version of Dreamgirls (2006), another film based on a play about a '60s girl group. Rotten Tomatoes gives the film a score of 91% based on reviews from 131 critics; their average rating was calculated as 6.9/10. Metacritic gives the film a "generally positive" rating of 67% based on reviews from 30 critics.

Guy Lodge from Variety said Chris O'Dowd's " dorky-dirty and manic performance energy... keeps the proceedings bouncy even when the script loses its own fizz." Mark Adams of Screen International called O'Dowd an "increasingly charismatic screen presence" who "helps give the film an edginess, spontaneity and some real laugh-out-loud moments." Eric Kohn from IndieWire gave it a C−, believing that it "belongs on Broadway more than the big screen".

Henry Barnes of The Guardian gave the film three stars out of five, calling it "a sweet 'n' dumb feelgood bopper." Brad Brevet of Rope of Silicon gave it a B−, summing it up as, "good music, good performances and good fun and should play well across several demographic quadrants." Robbie Collin of The Daily Telegraph gave the "workaday Australian comedy" three stars, calling it "uncomplicated" but praising Chris O'Dowd for elevating every scene he is in. Ross Miller of Thoughts on Film gave the film three stars, saying that it "may not break any especially new ground or end up in a place you're not expecting but along the way it's a genuinely pleasant watch."

Fiona Williams of SBS awarded the film three-and-a-half stars out of five, commenting that "There's much to love, lots to like... and enough roof-lifting musical numbers to make up for the dodgy bits."

Academic Bruno Starrs makes the argument that the film's Aboriginal protagonists undergo a journey in which they learn the importance of choosing the protest songs of black soul over the white coloniser's "whining" country and western songs. Their song choices are an assertion of Indigenous sovereignty and Starrs argues that the Aboriginal Australian "Welcome to Country" is twice subverted to reinforce this theme, firstly in the Cummeragunja pub and secondly in war-torn Vietnam."

== Awards and nominations ==
Ceremony	Category	Recipient	Result
45th AWGIE Awards	Best Feature Film (screenplay) – Adaptation	Keith Thompson; Tony Briggs	Won
45th AWGIE Awards	Most Outstanding Script of 2012	Keith Thompson; Tony Briggs	Won
26th ARIA Music Awards	Best Original Soundtrack/Cast/Show Album		Nominated
48th Chicago International Film Festival	Gold Hugo for Best Feature	Wayne Blair	Nominated
35th Denver Film Festival	People's Choice Award for Best Narrative Feature	Wayne Blair	Won
AACTA Awards (2nd)	Best Film	Rosemary Blight, Kylie du Fresne	Won
AACTA Awards (2nd)	Best Direction	Wayne Blair	Won
AACTA Awards (2nd)	Best Adapted Screenplay	Keith Thompson	Won
AACTA Awards (2nd)	Best Adapted Screenplay	Tony Briggs	Won
AACTA Awards (2nd)	Best Lead Actor	Chris O'Dowd	Won
AACTA Awards (2nd)	Best Lead Actress	Deborah Mailman	Won
AACTA Awards (2nd)	Best Supporting Actress	Jessica Mauboy	Won
AACTA Awards (2nd)	Best Cinematography	Warwick Thornton	Won
AACTA Awards (2nd)	Best Editing	Dany Cooper	Won
AACTA Awards (2nd)	Best Sound	Andrew Plain	Won
AACTA Awards (2nd)	Best Sound	Bry Jones	Won
AACTA Awards (2nd)	Best Sound	Pete Smith	Won
AACTA Awards (2nd)	Best Sound	Ben Osmo	Won
AACTA Awards (2nd)	Best Sound	John Simpson	Won
AACTA Awards (2nd)	Best Production Design	Melinda Doring	Won
AACTA Awards (2nd)	Best Costume Design	Tess Schofield	Won
AACTA Awards (2nd)	Best Visual Effects	James Rogers	Nominated
Deadly Awards 2013	Film of the Year		Won

== See also ==
- Cinema of Australia
