= Top End Wedding =

- Theatrical film poster
- Directed by: Wayne Blair
- Written by: Joshua Tyler; Miranda Tapsell
- Story by: Miranda Tapsell; Joshua Tyler; Glen Condie
- Produced by: Rosemary Blight; Kylie Du Fresne; Kate Croser
- Starring: Miranda Tapsell; Gwilym Lee; Ursula Yovich; Huw Higginson; Shari Sebbens; Kerry Fox
- Cinematography: Eric Murray Lui
- Edited by: Chris Plummer
- Music by: Antony Partos
- Production companies: Screen Australia; South Australian Film Corporation; Adelaide Film Festival; Goalpost Pictures; Tapsell, Tyler & Condie; Kojo Entertainment
- Distributed by: Universal Pictures; Entertainment One
- Release dates: 30 January 2019 (Sundance); 2 May 2019
- Running time: 113 minutes
- Country: Australia
- Language: English
- Box office: $3,681,669

Top End Wedding is a 2019 Australian romantic comedy film directed by Wayne Blair, starring Miranda Tapsell and Gwilym Lee. Tapsell also co-wrote the film and served as the executive producer.

The film tells the story of Lauren, a lawyer planning to wed her fiancé in her hometown, only to discover that her mother has abruptly left the family.

A follow-up television series, Top End Bub, was released in 2025, with Tapsell and Lee reprising their roles.

== Plot ==
In 1976, a young Daphne "Daffy" Ford escapes an arranged marriage in her homeland on the Tiwi Islands. While being chased by her relatives, she flees the island on a speedboat.

In the present day, Daffy's daughter, Lauren, works as a lawyer in Adelaide and has recently been promoted. Her boyfriend, Ned, proposes to her, suggesting a quick wedding; without telling her that he has just quit his job, also as a lawyer. Lauren's workaholic boss, Ms. Hampton, gives Lauren 10 days off for the wedding and honeymoon, an offer which Lauren accepts. They decide to quickly organise a wedding in Lauren's hometown of Darwin.

After arriving in Darwin, Lauren discovers that her mother has abandoned her father, Trevor, and that she is nowhere to be found. Lauren decides that she cannot marry without her mother present, and Ned takes her on a road trip to find her. Meanwhile, Lauren calls Ms. Hampton to come to Darwin and help plan the wedding in her absence.

Lauren and Ned follow traces left by Daffy but narrowly miss her at every turn. Lauren explains to Ned that her mother had always been evasive in talking about her past and has never taught her the Tiwi language; Lauren expresses shame and embarrassment in not knowing anything about her own heritage and culture. After meeting up with her aunt and talking to her, Lauren realises that her mother has returned to the Tiwi Islands.

While Ms. Hampton plans the wedding with Lauren's friends, she talks to Trevor, who has been depressed since Daffy has left him. He discusses his marriage with Ms. Hampton, and she in turn confides her former engagement to a man many years before. After the breakdown of that relationship, she has focused mostly on her work.

On their way to the Tiwi Islands, Lauren discovers that Ned had quit his job without telling her. This leads to an argument where they both claim that they are not being listened to. Lauren cancels the wedding and continues to the Tiwi Islands alone.

There, Lauren meets her extended family for the first time and is greeted with warmth. She finds her mother outside of a church and witnesses Daffy reuniting and reconciling with her parents; Lauren, in turn, meets her grandparents for the first time. Later, she informs Daffy of her engagement, but is afraid that she will regret her marriage just as her mother did. Conversely, Daffy tells her that she never regretted her marriage but regrets being estranged from her family. She tells Lauren that Ned is a good man and encourages her to marry him. Lauren calls Ned while he is at the airport; he initially ignores her calls, but Ms. Hampton appears and forces him to answer his phone. He and Lauren reconcile and she tells him that they must marry on the Tiwi Islands. Ned persuades Ms. Hampton to skip a day at work and come to the wedding, as he is grateful for her continuous support of Lauren and Trevor.

Ned rushes back to Trevor's house and encourages him to come to his daughter's wedding, despite his dishevelled state. Running late to the wedding, the two take the speedboat (the same one Daffy escaped on many years earlier) to the Tiwi Islands. Lauren and Ned reunite and are happily married in front of their family and friends; Ned tells Lauren that he intends to make a career change and become a chef. Trevor and Daffy reconcile and affirm their love for one another.

== Cast ==
- Miranda Tapsell as Lauren
- Gwilym Lee as Ned
- Kerry Fox as Ms. Hampton
- Shari Sebbens as Ronelle
- Ursula Yovich as Daphne 'Daffy'Ford
  - Brooklyn Doomadgee as Young Daffy
- Huw Higginson as Trevor Ford
  - Travis Jeffery as young Trevor Ford
- Rob Collins as Father Isaac
- Matt Crook as Robbie
- Taylor Wiese as Alex
- Tracy Mann as Annie
- Elaine Crombie as Dana
- Tierney White as Receptionist

== Production ==
Top End Wedding was directed by Wayne Blair. Miranda Tapsell co-wrote the film (with Joshua Tyler and Glen Condie) and served as the executive producer.

Cinematography was by Eric Murray Lui. The film was produced by Rosemary Blight, Kylie Du Fresne, and Kate Croser, through Tapsell, Tyler & Condie; Goalpost Pictures; and Kojo Entertainment, supported by Screen Australia, South Australian Film Corporation, and Adelaide Film Festival. Chris Plummer edited the film.

Antony Partos wrote the score. The soundtrack features the Yothu Yindi song "Treaty"; several traditional Tiwi Islands songs; "Down Under" by Colin Hay; and the songs "Shade Away" and "Don't You Worry", written by Zaachariaha Fielding and Michael Ross, and performed by them as the musical duo Electric Fields.

== Release ==
Top End Wedding had its world premiere at the Sundance Film Festival on 30 January 2019. It was released in Australian cinemas on 2 May 2019. Distribution was by Universal Pictures and Entertainment One.

== Reception ==
Top End Wedding was met with critical acclaim, earning a 90% approval rating on Rotten Tomatoes, based on 39 reviews with an average rating of 7/10. The website's critics consensus reads: "Familiar in form but winsome in its execution, Top End Wedding takes audiences on a romantic road trip with an appealing view."

=== Accolades ===
Award	Category	Recipient(s)	Result	Ref
AACTA Awards (9th)	Best Film	Rosemary Blight, Kate Croser, Kylie Du Fresne	Nominated	
AACTA Awards (9th)	Best Actress	Miranda Tapsell	Nominated	
AACTA Awards (9th)	Best Supporting Actress	Ursula Yovich	Nominated	

== Sequel series ==
In April 2024, an eight-part sequel series was announced, titled Top End Bub, with Tapsell and Lee returning as series leads. The series is created, executive produced, and written by Joshua Tyler and Tapsell and produced by Goalpost Pictures. It was filmed in The Northern Territory and Adelaide and is directed by Christiaan Van Vuuren and Shari Sebbens.

Other returning cast members include Ursula Yovich, Huw Higginson, Elaine Crombie, and Tracy Mann. Joining them are Rob Collins, Brooke Satchwell, Guy Simon, Clarence Ryan, and, making her acting debut as Taya ("Bub"), is Gladys-May Kelly.

The series will premiere on Prime Video in Australia and New Zealand on 12 September 2025, and will be distributed internationally by ZDF Studios.
