= Gwilym Lee =

British actor

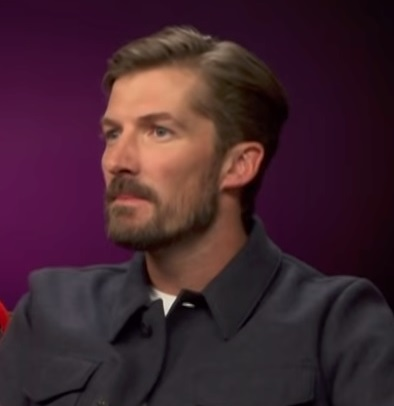
- Lee in 2018
- Born: Bristol, England
- Education: Cardiff University; Guildhall School of Music and Drama
- Occupation: Actor
- Years active: 1997–present

Gwilym Lee is a British actor. He is best known for his roles in Midsomer Murders (2013–2016), A Song for Jenny (2015), Jamestown (2017), Top End Wedding (2019), The Great (2020–2023), and for playing guitarist Brian May in the Queen biopic Bohemian Rhapsody (2018).

== Early life and education ==
Gwilym Lee was born in Bristol to Welsh parents, Tom and Ceinwen. He has three older siblings: Geraint, Owen, and Rhiannon. When he was young the family moved to Sutton Coldfield, West Midlands, although he identifies strongly with his Welsh heritage.

He studied English literature at Cardiff University and drama at Guildhall School of Music and Drama, where he received the Guildhall Gold Medal in 2008.

== Career ==
Lee joined a drama group as a teen. He then starred in the 1997–1998 television adaptation of the Animal Ark books. Aged 16 he started working on Richard III with the Royal Shakespeare Company. Lee appeared in a leading role in the final series of Land Girls (2011) and had several guest roles on television (including Ashes to Ashes, Fresh Meat, Monroe and Henry V). He has also worked on radio (The Emerald Tiger, The Silver Turk and in an adaptation of The Cruel Sea).

Lee was commended in the 2008 Ian Charleson Awards for his appearance in the National Theatre's production of Oedipus and in 2009 played Laertes to Jude Law's Hamlet in the Donmar West End season.

He won first prize of the 2011 Ian Charleson Award for his role as Edgar in the 2010 King Lear production at the Donmar Warehouse. In 2012, Lee starred in the Donmar Trafalgar Studios production of Aleksei Arbuzov's The Promise.

At Christmas 2013, Lee began a television starring role as DCI Barnaby's new sergeant, DS Charlie Nelson, in the 16th series of Midsomer Murders, which also included the show's 100th episode, partially shot in Denmark in collaboration with the local national broadcasting corporation, DR. In early 2014 he appeared in Versailles at the Donmar Warehouse.

In April 2016, it was announced by ITV that Lee was not returning for season 19 of Midsomer Murders. Lee, on his Twitter account, indicated he would be involved in an upcoming series Jamestown. Lee played guitarist Brian May in the Queen biopic Bohemian Rhapsody (2018), which earned him a nomination for Outstanding Performance by a Cast in a Motion Picture at the 25th Screen Actors Guild Awards.

In 2018, it was announced that Lee had joined the cast of the Hulu series The Great; on the series airing for three seasons from 2020 to 2023, Lee starred amongst the ensemble cast as Grigor Dymov, a composite character of Catherine the Great's historical lovers Grigory Orlov and Grigory Potemkin, and a childhood friend of Peter III.

In 2023, it was announced that Lee had been cast in the second season of SAS: Rogue Heroes, which was released in January 2025.

== Filmography ==
=== Film ===
Year	Title	Role	Notes
2008	The Escort		Short film
2010	The Tourist	Senior Technician Mountain	
2011	Isle of Dogs	D.C. Block	
2017	The Agency	Alistair	Short film
2018	The Last Witness	John Underwood	
2018	Bohemian Rhapsody	Brian May	
2019	Top End Wedding	Ned Pelton	Premiered at the Sundance Film Festival in January 2019
2023	Tall Dark and Handsome	James	Short film
2024	Oddity	Ted	
2024	Here	John Harter	

=== Television ===
Year	Title	Role	Notes
1997–1998	Animal Ark	James Hunter	TV series, 13 episodes
2008	Mutual Friends	Young Man	TV series, episode: #1.5
2009	Lewis	Terry Bainbridge	Episode: "The Quality of Mercy"
2009	Waterloo Road	Steven	TV series, episode #4.11
2009	Ashes to Ashes	Young Summers	TV series, episode #2.7
2010	Doctors	Anatole Karpski	TV series, episode: "Idle Hands"
2011	Land Girls	Reverend Henry Jameson	TV series, 5 episodes
2012	The Hollow Crown	Williams	TV miniseries, episode: "Henry V"
2012	Fresh Meat	Giles	TV series, episode #2.1
2012	Monroe	Alex Scholfield	TV series, episode #2.3
2012	Restless	Sean Gilmartin	Television film
2013–2016	Midsomer Murders	DS Charlie Nelson	TV series, 15 episodes
2015	A Song for Jenny	James	Television film
2017	The Royal House of Windsor	Narrator	Documentary series
2017	Jamestown	Samuel Castell	8 episodes
2019	The Man	Mark Baxter	Episode #1.2
2020–2023	The Great	Grigory "Grigor" Dymov	Hulu series, main cast
2024	SAS: Rogue Heroes	Bill Stirling	BBC series, season 2
2025	Top End Bub	Ned Pelton	TV series, main cast, sequel to Top End Wedding
TBA	The Siege	TBA	Upcoming drama series

=== Theatre ===
Year	Title	Role	Venue/Company	Notes
1999	Richard III	Edward, Prince of Wales	Royal Shakespeare Company	
2008	Oedipus	The Messenger and Understudy Oedipus	National Theatre	with Ralph Fiennes
2009	About Tommy	Tommy	Southwark Playhouse	
2009	Hamlet	Laertes	Kronborg Castle and Broadhurst Theatre	with Jude Law
2009	Hamlet	Guildenstern	Donmar Warehouse	
2010	The Fairy-Queen	Demetrius	Opera-Comique and Off-Broadway	
2010	Danton's Death	Lacroix and Understudy Danton	National Theatre	
2010–2011	King Lear	Edgar	Donmar Warehouse	
2011	Othello	Cassio	Sheffield Crucible	with Lily James, Dominic West
2012	The Promise	Leonidik	Donmar Warehouse at Trafalgar Studios	
2014	Versailles	Leonard	Donmar Warehouse	with Tom Hughes
2017	Diminished	Adam	Hampstead Theatre	
2025	Dear England	Gareth Southgate	Royal National Theatre	

=== Video games ===
Year	Title	Role	Notes
2013	Cloud Chamber	Tom	
2015	Dragon Quest Heroes: The World Tree's Woe and the Blight Below	Psaro the Manslayer	English voice
2015	Final Fantasy XIV: Heavensward	Cid	English voice
2019	Final Fantasy XIV: Shadowbringers	Cid	English voice
2020	South of the Circle	Peter	Voice, 3D motion capture
2021	Final Fantasy XIV: Endwalker	Cid	English voice

== Awards and nominations ==
Year	Association	Category	Nominated work	Result	Ref.
2008	Guildhall School of Music and Drama	Drama Gold Medal		Won	
2008	Ian Charleson Awards	Commendations	portraying the Messenger in Oedipus at National Theatre	Won	
2010	Ian Charleson Awards	First Prize	portraying Edgar in King Lear at Donmar Warehouse	Won	
2019	Screen Actors Guild Awards	Outstanding Performance by a Cast in a Motion Picture	Bohemian Rhapsody	Nominated	
2021	Screen Actors Guild Awards	Outstanding Performance by an Ensemble in a Comedy Series	The Great	Nominated	
