= Versailles (play) =

Play by the Welsh playwright Peter Gill

Versailles is a 2014 play by the Welsh playwright Peter Gill. It deals with the aftermath of World War I and the Treaty of Versailles, marking the centenary of the war's outbreak.

The premiere production was at the Donmar Warehouse from 20 February to 5 April 2014, directed by the playwright himself and with a cast including Gwilym Lee, Helen Bradbury, Barbara Flynn, Tom Hughes, Tamla Kari, Josh O'Connor, Simon Williams and Eleanor Yates.
