= Rob Collins (actor) =

Australian actor

- Born: 4 August 1979 (age 47); Darwin, Northern Territory, Australia
- Education: National Institute of Dramatic Art (BFA)
- Occupation: Actor
- Years active: 2013–present
- Awards: Logie Award for Most Popular New Talent

Robert Collins (born 4 August 1979) is an Australian actor and singer. His best known roles include Waruu West in Cleverman, Jack Winters in The Wrong Girl, and Charlie Irving in Total Control.

== Early life and education ==
Robert Collins was born and raised in Darwin, Northern Territory from a Tiwi Islands background. He worked with the National Indigenous Music Awards, and was the national Indigenous representative for the Australasian Performing Right Association (APRA) for three years.

He then looked for acting opportunities, and landed the roles of Theseus and Oberon in a local production of A Midsummer Night’s Dream, before being cast in more national and local productions. He auditioned and won a place at the National Institute of Dramatic Art, graduating in 2013.

== Career ==
He made his professional stage debut in 2013 as Mufasa in the Australian production of The Lion King.

Collins is best known for his major roles in the Australian television series Cleverman and The Wrong Girl, both of which premiered in 2016.

He played Lysander in A Midsummer Night's Dream at the Sydney Theatre Company in September and October 2016, directed by Kip Williams.

In 2017, he played Phil Holden in the Australian television program Glitch.

In 2019 Collins joined the cast of ABC political drama Total Control in the role of Charlie Irving for the shows first season, he reprised the role for the series third and final season in 2024. Collins was announced as part of the extended cast for Channel 9 series Human Error. Collins has since appeared in ABC comedy series Austin.

== Filmography ==
=== Film ===
Year	Title	Role	Notes
2018	Undertow	Dan	
2019	Top End Wedding	Father Isaac	
2019	Angel of Mine	Brian	
2020	Extraction	Rata	
2021	The Drover's Wife: Legend of Molly Johnson	Yadaka	
2023	Limbo	Charlie	
2024	Five Blind Dates	Curtis - Yoga Instructor	Release on Amazon Prime
2024	Arthur the King	Decker	
2026	Cold Storage	Enos Minjarra	

=== Television ===
Year	Title	Role	Notes
2016–17	Cleverman	Waruu West	Main role
2016–17	The Wrong Girl	Jack Winters	Main role
2017–19	Glitch	Phil Holden	Main role (seasons 2–3: 10 episodes)
2019	Secret City: Under the Eagle	Lieutenant Joseph Sullivan	Main role (6 episodes)
2019	Reef Break	Doug O'Casey	Recurring role (7 episodes)
2019–24	Total Control	Charlie Irving	Main role (18 episodes)
2020	Upright	Kane	Episode: "Day Seven"
2020	Black Comedy	Prosecutor Chris	Episode: "Series 4, Episode 6"
2020	Mystery Road	Amos	Main role (series 2: 6 episodes)
2020	RFDS	Wayne Yates	Main role
2021	Firebite	Tyson Walker	Main role
2023	Queen of Oz	Marc Kemarre	Main role (6 episodes)
2023	Ten Pound Poms	Ron	Main role (6 episodes)
2023	The First Inventors	Himself	Documentary
2024	Human Error	Gavin Butterfield	1 episode
2024–present	Austin	Minister Keeds	4 episodes
2025	Top End Bub	Jarad	

=== Stage ===
Year	Title	Role(s)	Theatre	Notes
2013	The Lion King	Mufasa	Capitol Theatre	
2016	A Midsummer Night's Dream	Lysander	Drama Theatre at the Sydney Opera House	
