= Tap Gallery =

Art gallery in Sydney, Australia

Coordinates: 33°53′43″S 151°13′0″E

The Tap Gallery is an art gallery, exhibition centre and arts and drama venue at 1/259 Riley St in Sydney, Australia. Aside from hosting art exhibitions it is also known for hosting plays and drawing classes. Brett C. Leonard's play Roger and Vanessa was put on at the Tap Gallery.
