= Wayne Blair (director) =

Indigenous Australian actor

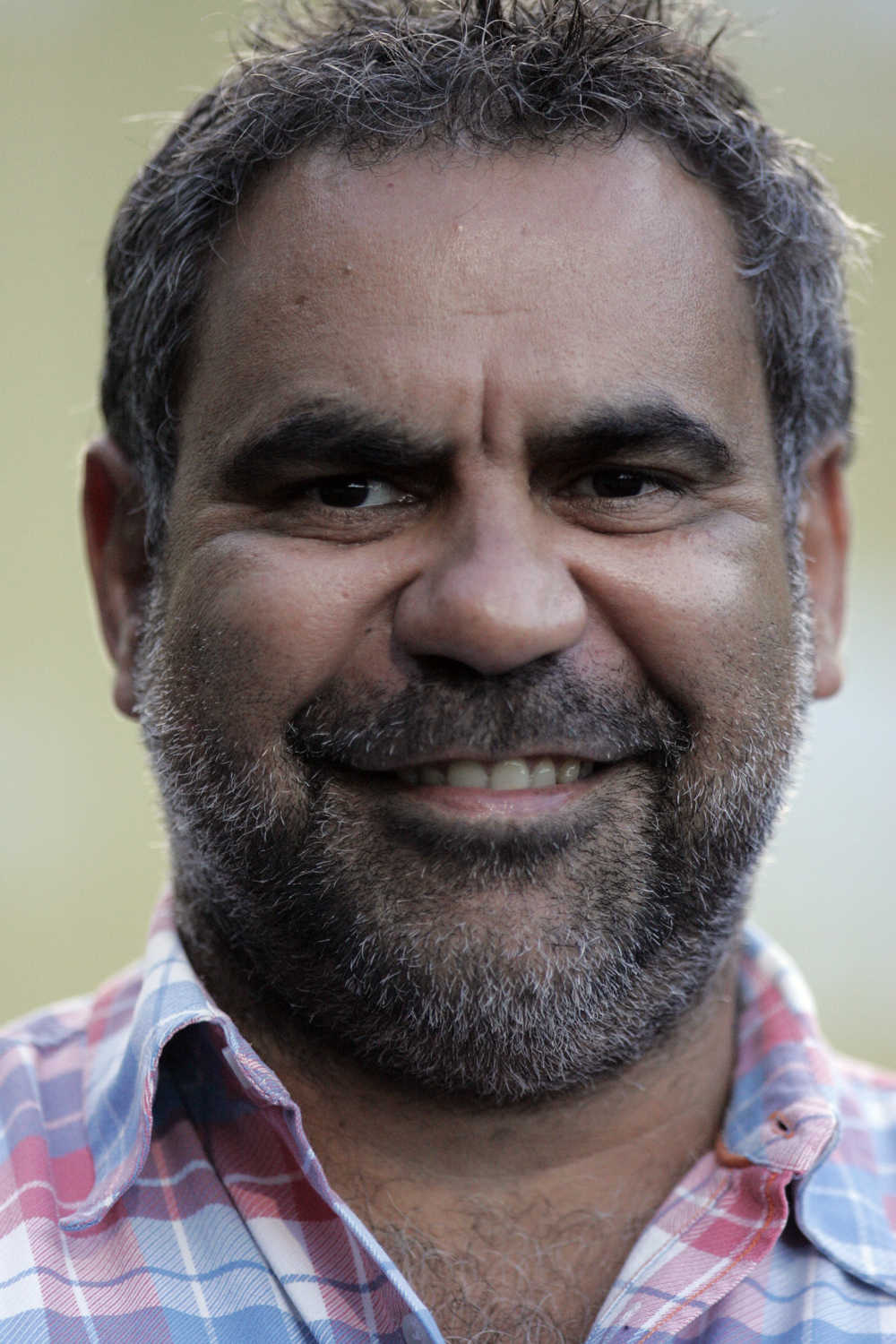
- Born: Taree, New South Wales, Australia
- Education: CQ University
- Occupations: Television and film director, writer, actor
- Website: wayneblair.com

Wayne Blair is an Australian writer, actor, and director. He was on both sides of the camera in Redfern Now, and directed the feature film The Sapphires. He played a prominent role in the 2021–2024 drama series Total Control.

== Early life and education ==
Wayne Blair was born in Taree, New South Wales, to Julie and Bob Blair, and has two older sisters, Janet and Mandy. He is an Aboriginal Australian man and he describes himself as a Batjala, Mununjali, Wakka Wakka man.

As Blair's father was a soldier, the family moved around. While Blair was still young, his father was posted to Woodside in South Australia. When he was a teenager, Blair's family were sent to Rockhampton, Queensland. In Rockhampton he excelled at cricket and rugby, then later became interested in acting and dancing at school.

Blair had a job as a tour guide at Rockhampton's Dreamtime Cultural Centre, where he was also one of the dancers. He went on to do a marketing degree at Central Queensland University, though his elective subjects included comic drama and Australian drama. He briefly went to Sydney to play rugby league for the Canterbury Bulldogs under-21s.

After a failed audition for NIDA in 1992, he eventually did a three-year course at the Queensland University of Technology in acting, at their Academy of the Arts. While a student there in 1997, he said "I' ve played Chinese, Puerto Rican, English, and Russian people, but I haven't played an Aboriginal person yet and I'd love to".

== Career ==
Blair's first recorded on-screen appearance was in a 1997 Australian TV film called The Tower. The following year he appeared on All Saints and Wildside. He has also appeared in Water Rats and Fireflies. 1998 was also the year he was one of the first four film makers to be mentored under the Metro Screen Indigenous Mentor Scheme for which he made a short film called Fade 2 Black. Ten years later he was to become a mentor himself under the same scheme.

Blair starred in the original stage production of Tony Briggs's play, The Sapphires in 2005. This play was later turned into a filmscript to be directed by Blair.

In 2007 he starred as Othello for Bell Shakespeare, a show that toured Australia with stops at Sydney, Melbourne and Canberra as well as other cities. He also directed three episodes of Lockie Leonard with a further four in 2010.

In 2008 Blair directed all thirteen episodes of the Australian children's TV series Double Trouble, about twin Indigenous girls separated at birth. In 2009 he wrote an episode of the second season of The Circuit. 2010 saw Blair direct four episodes of the Australian-British children's supernatural comedy TV series, Dead Gorgeous. He directed British-Jamaican Debbie Tucker Green's play Dirty Butterfly and co-directed the biographical play, Namatjira, with Scott Rankin who also wrote the play, both plays at Sydney's Belvoir St Theatre. He was also chosen in the same year as one of the stars of the Sydney Theatre Company's revival of Sam Shepard's True West, directed by Philip Seymour Hoffman.

Blair was awarded the Bob Maza Fellowship for 2011 by Screen Australia to provide opportunities for career development. 2012 was a big year which saw the making of his hit film, The Sapphires, which brought him recognition around the world with a very positive response at Cannes. Later in the year he starred in three episodes of the ABC's TV drama series, Redfern Now and directed another of the episodes. To finish the year Blair was included in Variety Magazine's top ten directors to watch in 2013.

He has occasionally worked on projects outside of Australia, including 2015's Septembers of Shiraz; a US production shot in Bulgaria, and a 2017 made for television remake of the American classic Dirty Dancing.

In 2020, Blair was named in the cast for ABC's Aftertaste.

In 2021, he was announced for the second season of ABC political drama Total Control (TV series) in the role of Paul Murphy and in 2023 Blair would join the filming for the third and final season. Blair also served as a director in the series directing 9 episodes. Blair also appeared in Netflix's Irreverent.

In 2023, he was a director on ABC's Bay of Fires and directed four episodes.

In 2024, Blair was announced as part of the directing team for the ABC drama Plum. Blair was announced as part of the directing team for the second season of Mystery Road: Origin. On 27 June 2025, Blair was named as the director of ABC series Goolagong.

== Other activities and roles ==
In 2021 he was appointed as one of three Indigenous ambassadors to the SmartFone Flick Fest, along with journalist and producer Stan Grant and screenwriter Jon Bell.

== Awards and recognition ==
- 2005: Winner, Crystal Bear for short film at the Berlin Film Festival, for The Djarn Djarns
- 2005: Nominated for Best Screenplay in a Short Film at the AFI Awards for his work on The Djarn Djarns
- 2011: Recipient of the Bob Maza Fellowship, which recognises emerging acting talent and support professional development for Indigenous actors
- 2012: Winner, AACTA Award for Best Direction, for The Sapphires
- July 2021: Invited to join the Academy of Motion Picture Arts and Sciences

== Filmography ==
=== Short film ===
Year	Title	Director	Writer
2016	3000	Yes	No
2014	Lie	No	Yes
2009	Ralph	No	Yes
2005	The Djarn Djarns	Yes	Yes
2002	Black Talk	Yes	Yes

Actor

Year	Title	Role
2021	Jarli	Pop
2019	Martha the Monster	The Director
2019	Closed Doors	Man
2016	Eaglehawk	Frank
2015	Nulla Nulla	Black Cop
2009	Brother Boys	Father
2005	The Djarn Djarns	Wayne the Compare

=== Feature film ===
Director

- Firestarter (2020)
- Top End Wedding (2019)
- Septembers of Shiraz (2015)
- The Elegant Gentleman's Guide to Knife Fighting (2013)
- The Sapphires (2012)

Executive producer

- Brando With The Glass Eye (2024)

Actor

Year	Title	Role
TBA	The Entertainment System Is Down	TBA
2025	Kangaroo	Ralph
2023	The New Boy	George
2022	Seriously Red	Lionel
2020	June Again	Dr Michael Lawton
2020	Extraction	KoeKoen
2020	Rams	Lionel
2019	Top End Wedding	Tow Truck Passenger
2018	Emu Runner	Jay Jay
2013	The Turning	Max
2012	Wish You Were Here	Willis
2011	X: Night of Vengeance	Bob
2011	The Last Time I Saw Michael Gregg	Smash
2009	Blessed	James Parker
2001	Mullet	James

=== Television ===
Year	Title	Director	Writer	Notes
2026	Goolagong	Yes	No	3 episodes
2025	Mystery Road: Origin	Yes	No	3 episodes
2024	Plum	Yes	No	3 episodes
2021–24	Total Control	Yes	No	9 episodes
2023	Bay of Fires	Yes	No	4 episodes
2021	Bangarra's World	Yes	No	Miniseries
2021	Dubbo-Life of a Strongman	Yes	No	TV Movie
2020	Mystery Road	Yes	No	3 episodes
2019	SeaChange	Yes	No	2 episodes
2018	Bite Club	Yes	No	2 episodes
2016–17	Cleverman	Yes	No	7 directed; Also executive producer
2017	Love Child	Yes	No	2 episodes
2017	Dirty Dancing	Yes	No	American TV movie
2014	Offspring	Yes	No	2 episodes
2014	The Gods of Wheat Street	Yes	No	2 episodes
2012-13	Redfern Now	Yes	Yes	3 episodes
2007-10	Lockie Leonard	Yes	Yes	Directed 8 episodes, wrote 1 episode
2010	Dead Gorgeous	Yes	No	4 episodes
2009	The Circuit	No	Yes	1 episode
2008	Double Trouble	Yes	No	13 episodes

Actor

Year	Title	Role	Notes
2026	Dalliance	Luke	TV series
2021–24	Total Control	Paul Murphy	12 episodes
2022	Irreverent	Peter	10 episodes
2021–22	Aftertaste	Brett	12 episodes
2021	Wakefield	Vince	2 episodes
2019	SeaChange	Riley Bolt	8 episodes
2018	Mystery Road	Larry Dime	6 episodes
2018–19	Squinters	Gary	9 episodes
2017	The Letdown	Father Whyman	2 episodes
2017	Dirty Dancing	Director	TV movie
2015	Redfern Now: Promise Me	Aaron Davis	TV movie
2014	Black Comedy	Guest Cast	7 episodes
2013	The Broken Shore	Bobby Walshe	TV movie
2012–13	Redfern Now	Aaron Davis	5 episodes
2007–10	Lockie Leonard	Arnold	1 episode
2007	Jackie Jackie	Koori Salesman	TV movie
2006	Small Claims: The Reunion	Det. Lacey	TV movie
2004	Small Claims	Det. Snr. Const. Lacey	TV movie
2004	Fireflies	Wayne Patterson	1 episode
2000	Water Rats	Ridley Winter	1 episode
1998	Wildside	Wes	1 episode
1998	All Saints	Kenny Baxter	1 episode
1997	The Tower	DJ Dan	TV movie
