= Miranda Tapsell =

Australian actress (born 1987)

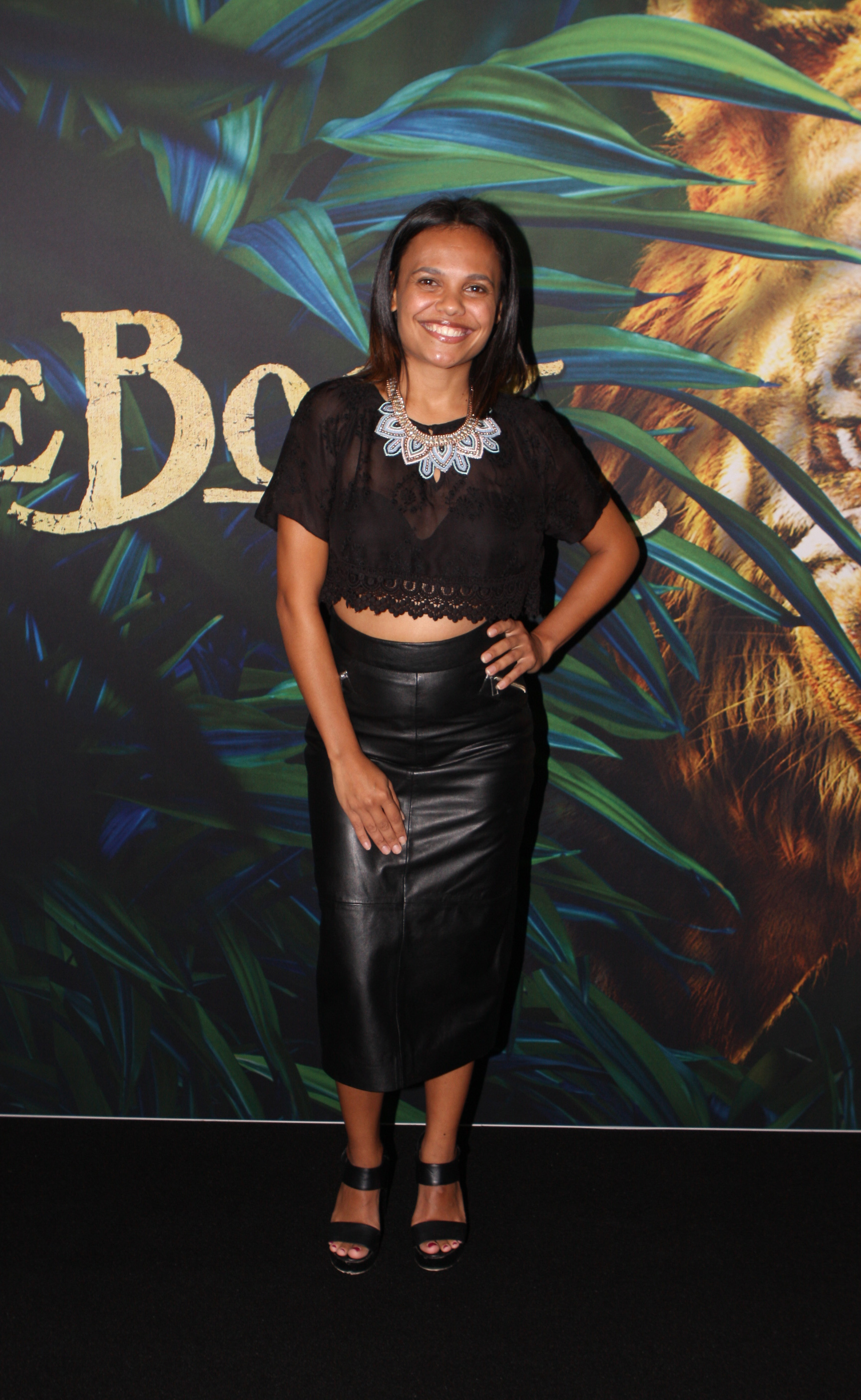
- Tapsell at The Jungle Book premiere at Event Cinemas in Sydney, March 2016
- Born: 1986 or 1987; Darwin, Northern Territory, Australia
- Education: National Institute of Dramatic Art (BFA)
- Occupation: Actress
- Years active: 2008–present
- Spouse: James Colley
- Children: 1?

Miranda Tapsell (born 1986 or 1987) is a Larrakia Aboriginal Australian actress of stage and screen, best known for her role as Cynthia in the Wayne Blair film The Sapphires and her 2015 performance as Martha Tennant in the Nine Network drama series Love Child. In 2016, she portrayed Fatima in the Stan series Wolf Creek. She starred in and co-wrote the 2019 film Top End Wedding, as well as the 2025 Amazon Prime Video sequel series Top End Bub.

== Early life and education ==
Miranda Tapsell was born in Darwin, Northern Territory in 1986 or 1987 to Tony and Barbara Tapsell. When she was five the family moved to Jabiru in West Arnhem Land, where she grew up around Kakadu National Park.

The family moved back to Darwin when Tapsell was 14 so that she could do her senior years in high school there. In 2004, when she was 16, Tapsell won the Bell Shakespeare Company regional performance scholarship. After finishing school she moved to Sydney to study at the National Institute of Dramatic Art (NIDA), from where she graduated in 2008.

== Career ==
Miranda's first stage appearance was at the Jabiru Wind Festival in September 1999. She sang as a student with the Jabiru Area School Choir.

Tapsell has been active both on stage and screen, starting with her 2008 performance in Dallas Winmar's play Yibiyung at the Belvoir Theatre, where she had the title role. In June 2010 she performed in A Midsummer Night's Dream at the Old Town Hall Ruins, Darwin. Later in that year she appeared as Ngala in Kamarra Bell-Wykes' Mother's Tongue at the Yirra Yaakin Theatre in Perth, a play about a young woman's connection to her Indigenous heritage. 2012 saw Tapsell as Bonita in the mini-series Mabo and then in the breakthrough role of Cynthia McRae, one of The Sapphires, Wayne Blair's film about a group of four Indigenous singers during the Vietnam War era. Tapsell topped the year off with her appearance as Teneka in the second episode of the ABC's Redfern Now.

Back in the theatre in 2013, Tapsell played a dual role (as Gillyagan and Muruli) in Andrew Bovell's The Secret River at the Sydney Theatre, a performance which earned her a nomination for the Helpmann Award for Best Female Actor in a Supporting Role in a Play. In 2014 Tapsell took on the role of Elizabeth, a young Indigenous woman, for a short film called Vote Yes which looked at issues around the 1967 referendum on including Aboriginal peoples in the census. The film was screened by the Recognise campaign, the movement seeking to recognise Indigenous Australians in the Australian Constitution. She appeared in four episodes of the ABC sketch programme Black Comedy. On the stage she played "Tiny Tim" Cratchit for a performance of Charles Dickens's A Christmas Carol at the Belvoir Theatre. While she was playing Tiny Tim at night, she was rehearsing for her next performance as a woman called Nona, who finds out her oldest sister is really her mother, in Louis Nowra's Radiance, also, conveniently, at the Belvoir Theatre.

Also in 2014 Tapsell became a member of the cast of the Channel 9 drama series Love Child, set in the 1960s. Her role is as an unmarried pregnant Indigenous woman, Martha Tennant, who ends up in a ward with several other unwed women in a fictitious hospital in Sydney's King's Cross at a time when it was taboo to be pregnant and not married. Her performance was extremely well received, garnering two Logies in May 2015, Best New Talent and the Graham Kennedy Award For Most Outstanding Newcomer. On reception of the first she urged the relevant people in the audience to "Put more beautiful people of colour on TV and connect viewers in ways which transcend race and unite us," adding, "That's the real team Australia." In 2016 she played Juliet in Justin Fleming's The Literati for Bell Shakespeare and Griffin's historic co-production of Molière's Les Femmes Savantes.

In 2017, 2018 and again in 2019 Tapsell starred as Charlotte Gibson in the Sydney Theatre Company production from playwright Nakkiah Lui, Black is the New White. Her role is a lawyer with a brilliant career who brings her non-Indigenous, unemployed experimental composer fiancé home to meet her family at Christmas. Tapsell wrote a contribution entitled "Nobody Puts Baby Spice in a Corner" for the 2018 biographical anthology Growing Up Aboriginal In Australia, edited by Anita Heiss and published by Black Inc.

In 2019, Tapsell co-wrote and starred in the romantic comedy Top End Wedding.

In April 2020, Tapsell's memoir, Top End Girl, was published by Hachette Australia.

In 2021, Tapsell was the co-host of the live television special Australia's Biggest Singalong! with Julia Zemiro.

In 2025, Tapsell reprised the role of Lauren Ford for the television series Top End Bub, a sequel to the movie Top End Wedding. Tapsell also serves as creator and co-writer of the series.

== Personal life ==
Tapsell is a Larrakia woman.

As of 2018 she was living in Melbourne with her husband, James Colley. The couple have a daughter, born in December 2021.

== Filmography ==
=== Film ===
Year	Title	Role	Notes
2012	The Sapphires	Cynthia	
2012	Mabo	Bonita	Telemovie
2014	Vote Yes	Elizabeth	Short
2014	Words with Gods		Anthology film
2017	The Kindness of Strangers	Woman	Short
2019	Top End Wedding	Lauren	Co-writer and associate producer
2019	The Wishmas Tree	Kerry	
2020	The Translator	Julie	
2021	The Dry	Rita Raco	
2021	Back to the Outback	Zoe	Voice role
2022	Christmas Ransom	Gladys	
2024	The Surfer	The Photographer	

=== Television ===
Year	Title	Role	Notes	Ref
2010	Magical Tales	Princess Desdemona	Episode 1.17: "Oh, Fairy Godmother!?"	
2012	Redfern Now	Teneka	Episode: "Joyride"	
2012	Black Comedy	Guest	4 episodes	
2014–17	Love Child	Martha Tennant	Main cast Logie Award for Best New Talent (2015); Logie Award for Most Outstanding Newcomer (2015)	
2016	Wolf Creek	Fatima	Episode 1	
2016	Cleverman	Lena	Episode 1.1	
2016	Secret City	Sasha Rose	6 episodes	
2017	Newton's Law	Skye Stewart	Episodes 2–8	
2017–23	Little J & Big Cuz	Little J	Main cast 50 episodes	
2017	Get Krack!n	Herself	Episode 1.6. Also additional writer	
2018	Squinters	Miranda	2 episodes	
2018–19	Doctor Doctor	April	16 episodes	
2018	No Activity	Herself	Episode: "The Night Before Christmas"	
2019	Get Krack!n	Herself	Episode 2.8. Also additional writer	
2021	Preppers	Young Nan	1 episode	
2022	Bluey	Dougie's Mum	Episode: "Turtleboy"	
2022	Summer Love	Kelly	1 episode	
2023	Kangaroo Beach	Wanda	4 episodes	
2023	Aunty Donna's Coffee Cafe	Julianne	1 episode	
2023	Big Mouth	Kara	1 episode	
2023	The Artful Dodger	Frances 'Red' Scrubbs	6 episodes	
2025	Top End Bub	Lauren Ford	Main cast, also writer and creator	

=== Unscripted ===
Year	Title	Role	Notes	Ref
2023	The ABC of...	Self	TV Special	
2021	The Hundred With Andy Lee	Self	1 episode	
2019–	Play School	Host		
2019	Talkin' 'Bout Your Generation	Self	1 episode	
2019	Show Me The Movie	Self	1 episode	
2015	The Verdict	Self	1 episode	
2014	Who Are We: Brave New Clan	Self	TV Special	

== Awards and nominations ==
Year	Award	Category	Work	Result	Ref(s)
2013	Helpmann Awards	Best Supporting Actress – Play	The Secret River	Nominated	
2013	Deadly Awards	Female Actor of the Year	—N/a	Nominated	
2015	Logie Awards	Most Outstanding Newcomer	Love Child	Won	
2015	Logie Awards	Best New Talent	Love Child	Won	
2016	Equity Ensemble Awards	Outstanding Performance by an Ensemble – Drama Series	Love Child	Nominated	
2019	AACTA Award	Best Actress	Top End Wedding	Nominated	
