= Anni Finsterer =

Australian actress

- Occupation: Actress
- Years active: 1986–present

Anni Finsterer is an Australian actress. For her performance in 3 Acts of Murder she won the 2009 Australian Film Institute Award for Best Guest or Supporting Actress in Television Drama.

== Early life ==
Finsterer grew up in Canberra, Australian Capital Territory.

== Career ==
Finsterer is a film, television and stage actor, voice over artist, director, playwright. author, singer, keynote speaker, coach and teacher (of acting and drama).

Feature films include I Met a Girl, The Flood (both 2020), True History of the Kelly Gang (2019), Sweet Country (2017), Teenage Kicks (2016), Sleeping Beauty (2011), The Boys are Back and Prime Mover (both 2009). She has had significant roles in Bigger Than Tina (1999) and To Have & to Hold (1996).

Recent television roles include The Gloaming for Stan, Harrow, Wentworth (season 7), the US TV series Reckoning, Rake, Secret City for Foxtel and Glitch for the ABC.

On 9 September 2024, Finsterer was named as part of the extended cast for Stan Australia series Thou Shalt Not Steal.

On 4 March 2026, Finsterer was named in the cast for Wolf Creek: Legacy.

== Stage ==
Her lengthy stage career has seen her perform in Australia, Asia and Europe, with Sydney Theatre Company, Melbourne Theatre Company, Queensland Theatre Company, Bell Shakespeare, Griffin Theatre Company, Belvoir Theatre Company, La Mama and more. Highlights include playing the title character in Sharon Lilly Screwdriver (Stables Theatre, 1991), and producing and acting in East (Bay Street Theatre, 1988). Other significant roles include playing Macbeth, Lady Macbeth, Cleopatra, Ishtar, and the Queen of Hearts on stilts.

Finsterer is also an author - her most recent publication being Radical Rock and Roll Resilience (2020) - a personal story of overcoming adversity, combined with strategies of how to live an empowered life.

She holds a Bachelor of Performing Arts, and a Diploma of Education in Drama and English.

== Filmography ==
=== Film ===
Year	Title	Role	Type
1990	Sky Trackers	Scientist	Feature film
1994	Cody: A Family Affair	Leilani	TV film
1995	Lessons in the Language of Love	Nicki	Short film
1996	To Have & to Hold	Rose	Feature film
1999	Bigger Than Tina	Jacinta Fellows	Feature film
1999	Strange Fits of Passion	Judy	Feature film
2000	Thomson of Arnhem Land	Narrator	Documentary film
2002	Queen of the Damned	Euro Trash Vampire	Feature film
2006	Candy	Crystal (uncredited)	Feature film
2007	The Uncertainty Principle	Nellie	Short film
2009	Prime Mover	Thomas's mum	Feature film
2009	3 Acts of Murder	Anne Upfield	TV film
2009	The Boys are Back	Tennis journalist	Feature film
2010	The Clinic	Locker room woman (DCIII, Blue)	Feature film
2011	Sleeping Beauty	Train riding hairdresser	Feature film
2011	Johnny Ghost	Millicent	Feature film
2011	Blue Monday		Short film
2012	Grace	Joy	Short film
2012	Devine is Dead	Kate Leigh	Short film
2013	Strange Tourist	Gena	Short film
2013	Touch	Sue	Short film
2015	Damage Control	The Pharmacist	Short film
2016	Teenage Kicks	Illona Varga	Feature film
2016	Wolf		Short film
2017	Sweet Country	Nell	Feature film
2019	Three Stories Inside a Rental Van		Short film
2019	My First Panic	Tracey	Short film
2019	True History of the Kelly Gang	Mrs Gill	Feature film
2019	Backpedal		Short film
2020	I Met a Girl	Miss Needle	Feature film
2020	The Flood	Wilma Wilson	Feature film
2021	We Have Me	Principal	Short film
2022	Lonesome	Carol	Feature film
2022	The Stranger	Female uniformed cop (uncredited)	Feature film
2022	Max	Suzie Williams	Short film
TBA	Wolf Creek: Legacy	TBA	Film

=== Television ===
Year	Title	Role	Type
1987	Sons and Daughters	Waitress	TV series. 1 episode
1990	The Paper Man	Australian newsreader	TV miniseries, 4 episodes
1987-91	Rafferty's Rules	TV publicist / Narelle Grimes	TV series, 2 episodes
1991	Police Rescue	Agnes	TV series, 1 episode
1992	Chances	Eva	TV series, 1 episode
1993	Seven Deadly Sins		TV miniseries, 1 episode
1997	Blue Heelers	Danielle Simpson	TV series, 1 episode
1997	State Coroner	Daria Bond	TV series, 1 episode
1998	Good Guys Bad Guys	Sergeant Hawthorn	TV series, 1 episode
1998	Halifax f.p.	Maxine	TV series, 1 episode
2000	Eugenie Sandler P.I.	Irene Kendall	TV miniseries, 1 episode
2001	Stingers	Suzie Lake	TV series, 2 episodes
2002-08	All Saints	Gina Finch / Gemma Lee / Stefanie Garrett	TV series, 8 episodes
2006	Love My Way	Wendy	TV series, 3 episodes
2007	Home and Away	Brenda	TV series, 1 episode
2009	City Homicide	Megan Black	TV series, 1 episode
2012	Underbelly	Dianne Erlich	TV series, 1 episode
2015-17	Glitch	Caroline Eastley	TV series, 3 episodes
2016	Secret City	Vice Admiral Joanna Hartzig	TV series, 5 episodes
2018	Rake	Judge	TV series, 1 episode
2019	Over and Out	Dr Facecutter	TV miniseries, 1 episode
2019	Wentworth	May Jenkins	TV series, season 7, 5 episodes
2020	The Gloaming	Eileen McGinty	TV miniseries, 6 episodes
2020	Reckoning	Karen Anderson	TV miniseries, 1 episode
2020	Deadhouse Dark	Grace	TV miniseries, 1 episode
2020-21	Space Nova	Guest cast	TV series, 8 episodes
2020-21	100% Wolf: Legend of the Moonstone	The Duchess / Mrs Mutton	TV series, 8 episodes
2021	Harrow	Di baverstock	TV series, 1 episode
2022	Barons	Vic	TV series, 1 episode
2023	The Clearing	Evelyn Smith	TV miniseries, 1 episode
2024	Return to Paradise	Donna Smithwick	TV series, 1 episode (Curl Up and Dye)
2024	Thou Shalt Not Steal	Billy	TV series: 2 episodes

== Theatre ==
=== As actor ===
Year	Title	Role	Location / Co.
1979	Man and Man		Childers Street Hall, Canberra
1986	Snatched!	Toni	The Rocks Theatre, Sydney with Nepean College of Advanced Education School of Arts Theatre
1987	Kennedy’s Children		Exchange Hotel, Sydney with New Mercury Theatre Company
1988	East		Bay Street Theatre, Sydney
1990	Gilgamesh	Ishtar	Ashgrove Quarry with Queensland Theatre Company
1991	Sharon Lilly Screwdriver	Sharon	Stables Theatre with Griffin Theatre Company
1992	The Women of Troy		Wharf Theatre, Sydney with Sydney Theatre Company
1993	Antony and Cleopatra	Cleopatra	Wharf Sea Level Space, Sydney with Sydney Theatre Company
1994	The Wedding Song		NIDA at Parade Theatre
1994	The Threepenny Opera		Sydney Opera House with Sydney Theatre Company
1995	Poor Super Man		Wharf 2 Theatre with Sydney Theatre Company
1996	Macbeth	Macbeth / Lady Macbeth	Victorian regional tour with Melbourne Theatre Company
1996	Lenz		The Police Garage with Mene Mene Theatre for Melbourne Festival
1996	Alice in Wonderland	Queen of Hearts	Melbourne Zoo with Australian Shakespeare Company
1997	Footprints on Water		La Mama
1997	Raised by Wolves		Shed 14, Docklands with Regurgitator and Handspan Theatre for Melbourne International Arts Festival
1998	The Present		Carlton Courthouse with La Mama
1998	Scissors, Paper, Rock		Trades Hall, Carlton South with La Mama
1998	The Keene / Taylor Project, Season 5: Kaddish / Violin / The Rain	Woman - The Violin	La Mama
2000	Gravegnomes		La Mama
2003	Rabbit	Kate	Stables Theatre with Griffin Theatre Company
2003	The Threepenny Opera	Tiffany	Belvoir Street Theatre
2004–05	Ray's Tempest	Ruthie	Belvoir Street Theatre
2004	Kimberly Akimbo		Ensemble Theatre
2005	The World's Wife	Littie Red Cap / Queen Herod / Pilate's Wife / Mrs Sisyphus / Queen Kong / The Devil's Wife / Mrs Lazarus / Mrs Icarus / Eurydice / Elvis's Twin Sister	Fairfax Studio with Melbourne Theatre Company
2007	Othello		Playhouse Canberra, Playhouse Melbourne, Sydney Opera House, Orange Civic Theatre with Bell Shakespeare
2007	Jesus Hopped the ‘A’ Train	Mary Jane Hanrahan	Belvoir Street Theatre
2011	Pin Drop	Voice Over Artist	Malthouse Theatre
2014	Parramatta Girls	Melanie	Riverview Productions at Lennox Theatre, Parramatta
2016	The Importance of Being Ernest		Ensemble Theatre
2017	In Real Life	Theresa Faber	Darlinghurst Theatre
2018	The Readers	Annie	Belvoir Street Downstairs Theatre
2023	Camp	Krissi	Seymour Centre with Siren Theatre Company
2024	Othello	Emilia	Playhouse Canberra, Playhouse Melbourne, Sydney Opera House, Orange Civic Theatre with Bell Shakespeare
	Set Piece		Sydney Festival
	Macbeth		Sydney Theatre Company
	The Loaded Ute		Sydney Theatre Company
	Hamlet		Theatre Up North Qld
	A Christmas Carol		American Drama Group Europe

=== As crew ===
Year	Title	Role	Location / Co.
1988	East	Producer	Bay Street Theatre
1992	The Tale of the Tiger	Designer / Director	Seymour Centre & European tour
1994	Bloodwood	Playwright	
1995	Shorts Program	Co-Author	Wharf Theatre
2000	Gravegnomes	Playwright / Director	La Mama
2000	The Sax Diaries	Director	The Fitzroy Gallery for Melbourne International Comedy Festival
2013	Stolen	Director	Education Program at Riverside Theatres Parramatta
2014	The Shoe-Horn Sonata	Director	Education Program at Riverside Theatres Parramatta
2014–15	Fast and Fresh (performance shorts)		Riverside Theatres Parramatta
2016	Betrayal in Shakespeare		Sport for Jove for Shakespeare Carnival 2016
2020	Girl Wild	Playwright	Australian Plays with Red Hot Arts Festival. Nominated for the Rodney Seabourne Award
2023	Amadeus	Resident Director	Sydney Opera House
	MotherHunt		Red Hot Arts Festival
	Malawa	Director	Seymour Centre with OnSTAGE
	Sunset Estate	Director	Seymour Centre with OnSTAGE
	The Astonishing World of Wonders: School of Life (aka Happiness is a Place Called School)	Playwright	Newtown High School of the Performing Arts (Senior showcase)

== Books ==
Year	Title	Type
	The Girl Who Lost Her Bounce	Novella
2020	Radical Rock and Roll Resilience: How to Get Up, Get Real & Totally Rock Your Life	Autobiography
2020	My Quarantine Companion	e-book (collaborator)

== Awards and nominations ==
Year	Nominated work	Organisation	Award	Result
2009	3 Acts of Murder	Australian Film Institute	Best Guest or Supporting Actress in Television Drama	Won
2020	Girl Wild	The Seaborn Broughton & Walford Foundation	Rodney Seabourne Playwrights Award	Nominated

== Personal life ==
In the 1980s Finsterer was involved in two car accidents, having to undergo many operations including skin grafts, facial reconstruction, a hand replacement and an ear reconstruction from her rib cartilage.
