= Sebastian Schulz =

German voice actor from Rostock (born 1977)

Sebastian Schulz (born 1977) is a German voice actor from Rostock.

== Roles ==
=== Television animation ===
- Angel Sanctuary (Setsuna Mudō (Kenji Nojima))
- Avatar: The Last Airbender (Zuko) and The Legend of Korra (General Iroh) (Dante Basco))
- Cardcaptor Sakura (Takashi Yamazaki (Issei Miyazaki))
- Digimon Frontier (Koichi Kimura, Duskmon, KaiserLeomon, Lowemon (Kenichi Suzumura))
- Dragon Ball GT (Trunks (Takeshi Kusao))
- Dragon Ball Z (Future Trunks (Takeshi Kusao))
- Fillmore! (Wayne Liggett (Lukas Behnken))
- Genshiken (Kōsaka Makoto (Mitsuki Saiga))
- I Got a Rocket (Rocket (Thomas Bromhead))
- Mobile Suit Gundam SEED (Rau Le Creuset (Toshihiko Seki))
- Wunschpunsch (Maurizio di Mauro (Rick Jones (voice actor)))
- X TV (Kamui Shirou (Kenichi Suzumura))
- Yu-Gi-Oh! (Yami Yugi (Shunsuke Kazama))

=== Video games ===
- Kingdom Hearts II (Seifer (Takehito Koyasu))
- Skylanders: Spyro's Adventure (Dino-Rang, Drill Sergeant (Thomas Bromhead))
- Skylanders: Giants (Dino-Rang, Drill Sergeant (Thomas Bromhead))

=== Dubbing roles ===
- Gossip Girl (Nate Archibald)
- Blades of Glory (Jimmy MacElroy (Jon Heder))
- Buffy the Vampire Slayer (Andrew Wells (Tom Lenk))
- Malcolm in the Middle (Francis (Christopher Masterson))
- Napoleon Dynamite (Napoleon Dynamite (Jon Heder))
- Scrubs (Chris Turk (Donald Faison))
- The Big Bang Theory (Howard Wolowitz (Simon Helberg))
- Star Wars: The Force Awakens and Star Wars: The Last Jedi (General Hux) (Domhnall Gleeson)
- The Dark Crystal: Age of Resistance ((skekGra, the Heretic) (Andy Samberg))

=== Radio plays ===
- 2012: Robert E. Howard: Schwarze Krallen, publisher: Titania Medien, ISBN 978-3-7857-4719-3
- 2012: M.R. James: Der Eschenbaum (The Ash-tree), publisher: Titania Medien, ISBN 978-3-7857-4720-9
