= Crumpler (disambiguation) =

Crumpler is an Australian bag company.

Crumpler may also refer to:

- Crumpler (surname)
- Crumpler, North Carolina
- Crumpler, West Virginia
- Joint Expedition Against Franklin, also known as the Battle of Crumpler's Bluff
