= Lonesome =

Lonesome may refer to:

== Films ==
- Lonesome (1928 film), an American comedy drama part-talkie film
- Lonesome (2022 film), an Australian drama film

== Songs ==
- "Lonesome", a song by Unwritten Law from the album Unwritten Law
- "Lonesome", a song by Sabrina Carpenter from the album Emails I Can't Send
- "Lonesome", a song by Shaed
- "Lonesome", a 1962 song by Adam Faith

== See also ==
- Loneliness
- Lonesome George (1910–2012), last known male Pinta island tortoise
