= Ian Roberts (rugby league) =

Australian rugby league footballer, and actor

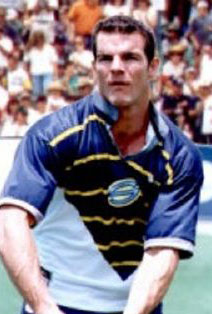

Personal information
- Born: 31 July 1965 (age 61) London, England, UK
- Height: 196 cm (6 ft 5 in)
- Weight: 112 kg (17 st 9 lb)

Playing information
- Position: Prop, Second-row
Club
Years	Team	Pld	T	G	FG	P
1986–89	South Sydney	65	5	0	0	20
1986–87	Wigan	19	3	0	0	12
1990–95	Manly Sea Eagles	100	4	0	0	16
1997–98	North Qld Cowboys	29	3	0	0	12
	Total	213	15	0	0	60
Representative
Years	Team	Pld	T	G	FG	P
1988–94	City NSW	5	0	0	0	0
1990–94	New South Wales	9	0	0	0	0
1990–94	Australia	13	3	0	0	12
1997	New South Wales (SL)	2	0	0	0	0
- Source: As of 31 July 2009

Ian Roberts (born 31 July 1965) is a British-born Australian actor and former professional rugby league footballer who played in the 1980s and 1990s. A New South Wales State of Origin and Australian international representative forward, he played club football with the South Sydney Rabbitohs, Wigan, Manly Warringah Sea Eagles and North Queensland Cowboys. In 1995 Roberts became the first high-profile Australian sports person and first rugby footballer in the world to come out to the public as gay.

== Early life ==
Ian Roberts was born in 1965 in Chelsea, London, England, to a father who worked in construction and was an amateur boxer, and a housewife mother. The family emigrated as Ten Pound Poms in 1967 to South Sydney, Australia, where the family was guaranteed a new house, and his father was guaranteed a job, continuing to work in construction. He was educated at Maroubra Bay High School.

== Football career ==
=== Club career ===
==== South Sydney ====
As a junior Roberts played for the Mascot Jets in the Souths juniors competition. He made his first grade début with the Rabbitohs in the 1986 Winfield Cup season and his form early on saw him touted as a bolter for the 1986 Kangaroo Tour, though ultimately he would miss selection.

At the end of the 1986 Sydney season, Roberts began a short stint with English club Wigan. In his first appearance for the Cherry and Whites on 1 October against St. Helens at Central Park, Roberts came on after 8 minutes as a replacement and made an astonishing 59 tackles as the home side won their 1986 Lancashire Cup semi-final 22–16. Two weeks later he played for Wigan against the Australian Kangaroos for the opening game of the 1986 Kangaroo Tour which Australia won 26–18. He played second row in Wigan's 15–8 victory over Oldham in the Lancashire County Cup Final at Knowsley Road in St. Helens, on Sunday 19 October 1986. and played in Wigan's 18–4 victory over Warrington in the 1986–87 John Player Special Trophy Final at Burnden Park in Bolton on Saturday 10 January 1987.

By the age of 21, Jack Gibson had described him as "the best front rower in the game", and in 1988 Roberts made the first of five appearances for the City Origin team.

==== Manly-Warringah ====
Roberts signed a contract with the Manly Warringah Sea Eagles in 1990, and later said that the main reason he left South Sydney was the money. With Souths having major financial difficulties at the time, they simply couldn't match Manly's offer which was worth around AU$100,000 more. While Roberts was a guest on The Footy Show to promote an interview with Peter Sterling, his former Rabbitohs teammate and Captain Mario Fenech confessed that he had signed with the North Sydney Bears from 1991 for exactly the same reason Roberts joined Manly.

He quickly justified his value with selection for NSW in the 1990 State of Origin series, where his form for the series winning Blues was good enough to see him selected for his Test début against New Zealand in Wellington. Unfortunately a groin injury suffered late in the season saw Roberts miss selection on the 1990 Kangaroo Tour. He returned to Manly's lineup in 1991, helping the Sea Eagles to 2nd place in the minor premiership behind eventual premiers Penrith. Unfortunately, an injury suffered in a close loss to Canberra late in the season ended his season, though he was back to fitness to be selected for the Kangaroos short tour of Papua New Guinea. During the year he had again played 2 games for NSW in the Origin series (despite still suffering from groin injuries), as well as playing all 3 mid-season Tests against New Zealand.

At the end of the 1994 NSWRL season, he went on the 1994 Kangaroo tour. Leading up front in Australia's Ashes-winning 23-4 Third Test victory at Elland Road. Not long after, Roberts signed with Super League despite his club and coach Bob Fulton remaining loyal to the Australian Rugby League. He played in Manly's upset loss to Canterbury in the 1995 ARL season's Grand Final.

==== North Queensland ====
Roberts sat out the 1996 season due to injuries and a contract dispute related to the Super League war. As a result, he missed out on playing in Manly's 1996 ARL Grand Final victory over St. George. In 1997, Roberts signed with the North Queensland Cowboys and captained the side. His career wound down in 1998 under the increasing weight of injuries.

=== State of Origin ===
Roberts made nine appearances for the New South Wales State of Origin team between 1990 and 1994. The Blues won six of the nine matches in which Roberts played.

=== Post-playing ===
In 2000, Roberts was awarded the Australian Sports Medal for his contribution to Australia's international standing in rugby league. He served on the National Rugby League's judiciary during the 2000s and in 2004 was named by Souths in their South Sydney Dream Team, which consists of 17 players and a coach representing the club from 1908 through to 2004. In 2005, he was named one of the 25 greatest ever New South Wales players. In March 2014, Roberts revealed that he has brain damage after being knocked out up to a dozen times in his playing career.

== Life outside football ==
Roberts came out as gay in 1995, becoming the first rugby league player in the world to do so, and only one of two Australian players to have done so as of 2026. He discussed his sexuality in magazines and on television over the following year. The NRL Footy Show principals Paul Vautin, Peter Sterling and Steve Roach appeared in a poster campaign against homophobia conducted by the Lesbian and Gay Anti-Violence Project. He was praised for helping to question prevailing myths about gays and sport. Paul Freeman wrote a book on Roberts, Ian Roberts – Finding Out, which was published in 1997.

In 1999 Roberts was taken to court by Garry Jack over an on-field brawl that occurred in 1991. Jack stated he was taking a stand against a beating he received from several Manly players. He attempted to sue Roberts for $100,000 in damages, alleging he suffered shock, traumatic injuries to his face and eyes, cuts, headaches and numbness, and was embarrassed by scarring to his face. Jack and Roberts eventually settled the dispute out of court with Roberts handing over more than $50,000.

Roberts has stated he is a sex abuse victim, and gave evidence to the State Coroner of New South Wales in regard to the murder of Arron Light, a teenage boy who was set to give evidence against a paedophile syndicate. Light disappeared in 1997, and his remains were recovered in 2002. Roberts accused the same man who molested him in his teens of being behind Light's death. This story was the subject of an episode of the Australian TV program Australian Story, entitled "The Lost Boy", which first aired on 26 September 2005.

Early in 2005, Roberts appeared in the second series of the Australian television series Dancing with the Stars, dancing with Natalie Lowe. He was runner up in the competition, losing out to Tom Williams.

Roberts appeared on 17 July 2007 cover of The Advocate magazine in an exclusive interview with Canadian author and journalist Michael Rowe, along with a photo layout by celebrity photographer Eric Schwabel.

In September 2010, Roberts publicly criticised Australian swimming star Stephanie Rice for calling the South African rugby union team "faggots" on Twitter, branding her "a complete idiot".

A member of the Australian Labor Party, Roberts has twice stood unsuccessfully as an ALP candidate for the Council of the City of Sydney in 2016 and 2021.

Ian Roberts is a director and co-founder of Qtopia Sydney, an Australian museum of LGBTQ history and culture which opened in February 2024.

== Acting career ==
Roberts finished playing professional rugby league in 1998, and began studying at the National Institute of Dramatic Art in Sydney. In 2003 he moved to the United States in search of acting opportunities.

Roberts made a very brief cameo in the 2002 film Star Wars: Episode II – Attack of the Clones as a bartender working in the Outlander Club where Obi-Wan Kenobi and Anakin Skywalker apprehend the bounty hunter Zam Wesell. In 2005, Roberts had a brief cameo in the Australian film Little Fish, starring Cate Blanchett and Hugo Weaving, playing an ex-rugby league star. He appeared in the 2006 motion picture Superman Returns as Riley, a henchman of Lex Luthor.

In 2009, Roberts appeared in the Australian television mini-series Underbelly: A Tale of Two Cities, which retells real life events of the drug trade in the New South Wales town of Griffith between 1976 and 1987. The mini-series is a prequel to the 2008 mini-series Underbelly, which was about Melbourne gangland killings. Roberts has a role as a body guard for George Freeman (played by Peter O'Brien). The series began airing in NSW on 9 February 2009. Also in 2009, he starred in The Cut on ABC1 and had a small role in the film Cedar Boys. In 2012 Ian landed his first starring role in the film Saltwater, starring opposite Ronnie Kerr, which is also Ian's first role playing a gay man.

In 2016 he appeared in Craig Boreham's gay-themed film Teenage Kicks, playing a straight single father. In 2021 Roberts appeared in episode 1, series 3 of Mr Inbetween playing small-time arms dealer, Graham. In 2022 he appeared in Boreham's followup film Lonesome.

== Filmography ==
=== Film ===
Year	Title	Role	Notes
2002	Star Wars: Episode II – Attack of the Clones	Ganwick Trag (uncredited)	
2003	Room 14	The Monster	Short film
2005	Transient	Narrator	Short film
2005	Crooked Mick of the Speewah	Crooked Mick	Short film
2005	Little Fish	Marty	
2006	Superman Returns	Riley	
2006	Darklovestory	Bruder	
2009	Cedar Boys	Bell room door man	
2010	Genesys	Hired agent	Short film
2011	Mug's Game	Shad Newbolt	Short film
2012	Celebrity Sex Tape	Bronco	
2012	Celestial Guard	Cain	Short film
2012	Vendetta	Thug #1	Short film
2012	Saltwater	Josh	
2012	The Vanisher	CAPRI	
2012	Killjoy Goes to Hell	Bailiff	
2012	Puppet Master X: Axis Rising	SS Soldier #1	
2012	Chester Briggins' Magic Blood	Brother Mayweather	Short film
2012	The Undercard	Ian	Short film
2012	Hate Crime	Three	
2012	Pause	Bearclaw	
2012	Gallic	Massive guard	Short film
2012	Sleep Attack	Darwin	Short film
2013	Quarantine L.A.	Zombie	
2013	The Big Lug	Harvey	Short film
2013	Genesis	Richard Hawkins	Short film
2013	13/13/13	Staircase Crazy #2	
2013	The Fall	Malek	Short film
2013	My So Called Family	Sheldon	Short film
2013	Towers of Terror	Brian	
2013	MANipulation Part 1	Troy	Short film
2013	Absent Bliss	Warren	Short film
2014	Android Cop	Hawk Eye	
2014	P-51 Dragon Fighter	Anak	
2014	Turkey Shoot	Haakon	
2014	Denied and Betrayed	Arms Dealer	Short film
2014	The Houses October Built	Feaster Bunny	
2014	Mile Marker Seven	Christian	
2014	My Christmas Wish	Zack	Short film
2014	Rise	Rymer Britton	Short film
2014	Hard Right	Winslow Harris	Short film
2016	13 Days	Monster	
2016	Teenage Kicks	Jack O'Connel	
2016	The Osiris Child: Science Fiction Volume One	Nimal	
2017	Aggregate	Harry	
2017	Adrenochrome	Brutus	
2017	Baby Boy	Coach Gibson	Short film
2020	Fantasy Island	Dr. Torture	
2020	False Colors	Hotel assassin	
2022	Lonesome	Pietro	
2022	Unreported	Jack	
2024	Furiosa: A Mad Max Saga	Mr. Harley	

=== Television ===
Year	Title	Role	Notes
2003	White Collar Blue	Frank Gambino	Episode: Episode 2.14
2006	Blue Heelers	Wayne Rhodes	Episode: "What's Love Got to Do with It"
2008	Kiss Me Deadly	Fredrick	Television film
2008	BoysTown	Bar manager	Episode: "Visitors"
2009	Underbelly: A Tale of Two Cities	Barry	9 episodes
2009	The Cut	Sports beat anchor	4 episodes
2009	Sea Patrol	Nathan Talbot	Episode: "Red Sky Morning"
2012	Wonder Girls	Security guard	Television film
2012–13	La Verdad: Beginnings	Lazarus	Web series; 8 episodes
2012	Vendetta	Thug #1	Web series; episode: "V101: Pilot"
2013	Game Over	Bodyguard #1	Episode: "Sniper"
2013	My Life as a Video Game	Sarge	Web series; 4 episodes
2014	Project: Phoenix	Agent Holden	Web series
2016	Soul Mates	Thutmose	4 episodes
2018	Black Comedy	Guest cast	Episode: Episode 3.6
2019	Les Norton	Danny "Foghorn" McCormack	5 episodes
2021	Mr Inbetween	Graham	Episode: "Coulda Shoulda"
2023	The Adventures of the West Bros.	Giant scout	2 episodes
