= Newtown Flicks Short Film Festival =

Former short film festival in Sydney (2006–2012)

Newtown Flicks Short Film Festival was an Australian competitive film festival featuring short films. It was held annually in and around the Sydney suburb of Newtown, Australia, from 2006 until 2012. After that, the organisation turned to film production.

== History ==
The Newtown Flicks was established as a non-profit organisation in 2005, "to meet the demands of the underground Sydney short film industry". The festival was created by Martin Kelly, Bill Jordan, and Spiros Hristias while the three worked as equipment operators in the bio box of New Theatre, a live performance venue in Newtown. Meeting in local cafes, the creators developed the festival's name and logo, its aim and awards categories.

After setting up the enterprise with their own money Kelly, Jordan, and Spiros looked for outside sponsorship for the festival. Since 2006, the festival's major sponsor has been JVC Professional, donors of filmmaking equipment. As a result, the JVC Encouragement Award is presented to a filmmaker showing potential not yet fully realised. Cash prizes are offered in the other categories together with bags for audio-visual accessories made by Crumpler and statuettes made by a local arts collective.

Over the years Newtown Flicks received grants from City of Sydney and Screen NSW. It became a national film festival for Australia in 2009.

Design of the statuettes and posters changed with each festival.

After the 2012 festival, Newtown Flicks announced that the organisation was moving into film production.

== Notable participants ==
In addition to showcasing the future of the Australian film industry, the following industry personalities have been involved with Newtown Flicks :

- Bruce Beresford, director
- Mark Lee, actor
- Genevieve Lemon, actor and singer
- Grant Page - stuntman (Mad Max, The Pact)

== Winners ==
=== 2006 ===
Held at the New Theatre between 15–17 April

Award	Winning Title
PICK OF THE FLICKS # 1	Tackle
PICK OF THE FLICKS # 2	The Chess Set
DIRECTORS CHOICE # 1	Birthday Present
DIRECTORS CHOICE # 2	Europe

=== 2007 ===
Held at the Newtown Theatre between 30 March - 1 May

Award	Title	Director
BEST STUDENT FILM	Still Life	Tahnee McGuire
BEST INDEPENDENT	Transient	Craig Boreham
BEST TREEHOUSE	Wally	Tonnette Stanford
DIRECTORS CHOICE	The Death of an Official	Natalie Lopes & Marlene Palmeiro
JVC AWARD	Not Sitting Still	Sarah Antill

=== 2008 ===
Held at the PACT Theatre between 20 May – 1 June

Award	Title	Director
BEST STUDENT FILM	Modern Primitives	Kate Witchard
BEST INDEPENDENT	Playground	Eve Spence
BEST TREEHOUSE	Floating	Chih-Kuang Tu
DIRECTORS CHOICE	The Cypriot	Vincent Taylor
JVC AWARD	One Shoe Billy	Aiden Koegh

=== 2009 ===
In May 2009 Newtown Flicks Short Film Festival returned to the New Theatre, where the judging panel was led by twice Academy Award-nominated director Bruce Beresford.

Award	Title	Director
BEST STUDENT FILM	Reach	Luke Randall
BEST INDEPENDENT	Fade	Vincent Taylor
DIRECTORS CHOICE	Burden	Ben Field and Liam Doyle
JVC AWARD	Mercury Vapour	Zoe Barnes

=== 2010 ===
In June 2010 Newtown Flicks Short Film Festival landed at the PACT Theatre, where the judging panel was led by director Bruce Beresford.

Award	Title	Director
BEST STUDENT FILM	Tundra	Claire Phillips
BEST INDEPENDENT	Frail	Alex Murawski
DIRECTORS CHOICE	Identity Theft	Stuart White
JVC AWARD	Me, Myself and iPod	Aidan Prewett
PANAVISION AWARD	What If Girl	Heremaia Rudkin
