= The Army Show =

- Genre: Sitcom
- Created by: J.J. Wall
- Written by: Peter Aronson; Caroline Case
- Directed by: John Ferraro; Rob Schiller
- Starring: John Sencio; Toby Huss; David Anthony Higgins; Harold Sylvester; Ivana Miličević; Craig Anton; Brian Posehn
- Country of origin: United States
- Original language: English
- No. of seasons: 1
- No. of episodes: 13

Production
- Camera setup: Multi-camera
- Running time: 30 minutes
- Production companies: Floating Cork Productions; Castle Rock Entertainment

Original release
- Network: The WB
- Release: September 13 – December 13, 1998

The Army Show is an American sitcom television series that aired on The WB, first shown on September 13 and ended its run on December 13, 1998. The plot follows an army sergeant, played by David Anthony Higgins, who must take charge of a group of soldiers at Fort Bendix, Florida, while hiding his profitable schemes from his higher class officers.

== Premise ==
The show is about a former hacker named John Caesar who joins the United States Army instead of going to prison, and is enlisted at a fictional military complex known as Fort Bendix. The camp is under the supervision of master sergeant David Hopkins. After an official from The Pentagon visits the camp and finds the recruits misbehaving, the show then deals with the recruits' attempts to keep the camp open.

== Cast ==
- David Anthony Higgins as Sgt. David Hopkins
- John Sencio as John Caesar
- Harold Sylvester as Colonel John Henchy
- Victor Togunde as Ozzie Lee
- Craig Anton as Lt. Branford Handy
- Toby Huss as Rusty Link
- Ronnie Kerr as Romeo
- Ivana Miličević as Pvt. Lana Povac

== Episodes ==
| No. | Title | Directed by | Written by | Original release date | Prod. code |
|---|---|---|---|---|---|
| 1 | "Pilot" | Rob Schiller | J.J. Wall | September 13, 1998 | 245100 |
| 2 | "The New Captain" | Unknown | Unknown | September 20, 1998 | 245101 |
| 3 | "Fantasy Camp" | Rob Schiller | Chris Henchy | September 27, 1998 | 245103 |
| 4 | "Shipping Out" | Rob Schiller | J.J. Wall | October 4, 1998 | 245102 |
| 5 | "The Military Ball" | Rob Schiller | David Raether | October 11, 1998 | 245104 |
| 6 | "I'll See Your Five and Raise You an Eddie" | Rob Schiller | Caroline Case | October 18, 1998 | 245105 |
| 7 | "Have I Got a Deal for You" | Brian K. Roberts | Joe Keyes | October 25, 1998 | 245107 |
| 8 | "Area 52" | Rob Schiller | Maryanne Melloan | November 1, 1998 | 245106 |
| 9 | "Eddie Goes to College" | Brian K. Roberts | Caroline Case | November 8, 1998 | 245108 |
| 10 | "An Officer and a Gentleman" | Brian K. Roberts | Will Forte | November 15, 1998 | 245109 |
| 11 | "J. Paul Caesar" | John Ferraro | Peter Aronson & Chris Henchy | November 22, 1998 | 245110 |
| 12 | "The Visitor" | John Ferraro | J.J. Wall | December 6, 1998 | 245111 |
| 13 | "Paymaster" | Rob Schiller | David Raether & Maryanne Melloan | December 13, 1998 | 245112 |

== Critical reception ==
Anthony Shoemaker of the Dayton Daily News wrote that "This extremely stupid sitcom surrounding a band of misfits at a forgotten Army compound is one of the worst television programs I have seen."
