= Danielle Boesenberg =

Australian film and television editor

- Danielle Boesenberg
- Education: UNSW College of Fine Arts; Australian Film Television and Radio School
- Occupations: Film and television editor
- Website: www.danielleboesenberg.com

Danielle Boesenberg is an Australian film and television editor based in Sydney. Her work includes the short films The Aquarium and Birdie, the feature film Lonesome, and the television series Colin from Accounts. She was elected president of the Australian Screen Editors Guild in 2021 and she served a four-year term.

== Education and early career ==
Boesenberg studied media arts at the UNSW College of Fine Arts and subsequently completed a graduate diploma in editing at the Australian Film Television and Radio School. She initially worked in television advertising before moving into light entertainment. She began working as a freelance editor in 2004.

== Career ==
Boesenberg worked extensively in short films before moving into longer-form film and television productions. Her AFTRS graduation film Kiss screened in competition for the Short Film Crysal Bear at the 2012 Berlinale. In January 2019, IF Magazine reported that she had edited more than 30 short films. Five productions she had worked on were selected for that year's Flickerfest: Ritual, Dust Devil, Birdie, Black Lips, and I F*cked a Mermaid and No One Believes Me.

In 2014, Boesenberg was nominated for the Australian Screen Editors Award for Best Editing in a Music Video for Guineafowl's "Little Death (Make It Rain)".

She collaborated with director Jacobie Gray on The Aquarium, for which she received the 2015 Australian Screen Editors Award for Best Editing in a Short Film. Their second collaboration, The Beehive, premiered at the 2017 Tribecca Film Festival. Boesenberg also edited Shelly Lauman's Birdie, which was selected for the 2018 Toronto International Film Festival. Her editing of Birdie received a special mention at Flickerfest in 2019.

Boesenberg edited Craig Boreham's feature film Lonesome, which went on to premiere at the 69th Sydney International Film Festival. Her television work includes Doctor Doctor, The PM's Daughter, One Night, Totally Completely Fine, and Colin from Accounts, for which she received nominations for the AACTA Award for Best Editing in Television in 2024 and 2025.

Her subsequent television work includes the first season of Return to Paradise, and second seasons of The Twelve and Austin, as well as Sunny Nights, starring Will Forte and D'Arcy Carden which screened by invitation at the Berlinale Series market before premiering on Hulu.

In a 2024 interview, Boesenberg described her transition into scripted television following work on approximately 40 short films. She discussed editing as a process involving story, performance, pacing and rhythm, alongside collaboration with directors, producers and broadcasters.

In December 2025, Boesenberg was awarded Accreditation by the Australian Screen Editors at the annual Ellie Awards in Sydney, making her Danielle Boesenberg ASE.

== Awards and nominations ==
Year	Award	Category	Work	Result	Reference
2014	Australian Screen Editors Awards	Best Editing in a Music Video	Guineafowl – "Little Death (Make It Rain)"	Nominated	
2015	Australian Screen Editors Awards	Best Editing in a Short Film	The Aquarium	Won	
2019	Flickerfest	Special Mention for Editing	Birdie	Special mention	
2024	AACTA Awards	Best Editing in Television	Colin from Accounts, episode 3	Nominated	
2025	AACTA Awards	Best Editing in Television	Colin from Accounts, episode 3	Nominated	
2026	Australian Screen Editors Awards	Best Editing in Children's Entertainment	Caper Crew, season 1, episode 5	Nominated	
2026	Australian Screen Editors Awards	Best Editing in Scripted Half Hour	Colin from Accounts, season 3, episode 1	Nominated	

== Selected filmography ==
=== Films ===
Year	Title	Format	Role	Reference
2011	Kiss	Short Film	Editor	
2015	The Aquarium	Short film	Editor	
2018	Birdie	Short film	Editor	
2018	Black Lips	Short film	Editor	
2018	Cherry Season	Short film	Editor	
2019	Chlorine	Short film	Editor	
2019	St Augustine	Short film	Editor	
2021	Dwarf Planet	Short film	Editor	
2022	Lonesome	Feature film	Editor	

=== Television ===
Year	Title	Role	Notes
2022	Colin from Accounts	Editor	Season 1
2024	Colin from Accounts	Editor	Season 2
2024	Return To Paradise	Editor	Season 1
2024	The Twelve	Editor	Season 2
2025	Austin	Editor	Season 2
2025	Sunny Nights	Editor	Season 1
2026	Colin from Accounts	Editor	Season 3
