= Bonnie Elliott =

Australian cinematographer

Bonnie Elliott is an Australian cinematographer. She has been nominated for and won numerous AACTA Awards in cinematography, including for Spear (2015), Seven Types of Ambiguity (2017), H Is for Happiness (2019), and Stateless (2020).

== Early life and education ==
Bonnie Elliott graduated from the University of Technology Sydney in 1988. While studying there, she was involved in the production of student films and the teen drama Heartbreak High. One of her teachers was US-born cinematographer and documentary filmmaker Martha Ansara.

In 2006 she obtained a Master of Arts in Film, Television, and Digital Media Cinematography AFTRS, where she studied under female cinematographers Jan Kenny and Erika Addis.

== Career ==
Elliott worked as a clapper loader and focus puller for eight years, at the same time shooting her own work on a number of short films, using short ends left over from her jobs.

Her first feature film was My Tehran for Sale (2008), which she said would always be a major highlight of her career. Shot in Iran, the crew filmed in Tehran for 11 weeks. She was the only Australian, and the only female working with a crew of Iranian men, on the film about young artists living under the repressive Iranian regime, which made it somewhat risky. She was DOP on the 2013 Zak Hilditch drama These Final Hours.

Elliott was requested by Stephen Page of Bangarra Dance Theatre to collaborate with him on the production of Spear (released 2015), an adaptation of Page's stage work, which explores themes of Aboriginal masculinity.

She shot Meryl Tankard's 30-minute documentary film Michelle's Story, about the dancer and choreographer Michelle Ryan, who has multiple sclerosis. Ryan became artistic director of Restless Dance Theatre in 2013. The film premiered at the Adelaide Film Festival in October 2015, and won the Audience Award there. It went on to screen at other festivals, and won other awards.

She filmed the short film Drowning with longtime friend and collaborator Craig Boreham, as a prelude to the 2016 film Teenage Kicks, which was made on a tiny budget. Drowning had its Australian premiere at the Flickerfest International Short Film Festival in December 2009 at Bondi Beach in Sydney.

In 2017, Elliott was cinematographer for "Joe", the second episode of Seven Types of Ambiguity. She also shot the 2019 family film H Is for Happiness, Rachel Ward's 2019 comedy drama Palm Beach. and the psychological thriller Undertow, released in 2020.

Elliott filmed the music video for the song "Leaves" for the indie band Even as We Speak (from their 2020 album Adelphi), which was directed by Matias Bolla. She worked on the ABC TV drama series Fires, which aired in late 2021, and the documentaries Freeman and Step into Paradise.

Elliott was cinematographer for the 2023 film Run Rabbit Run. She was one of four responsible for cinematography for Jolyon Hoff's 2025 feature documentary We Are Not Powerless, with Maxx Corkindale, Khadim Dai, and Andrew Commis. Elliott was responsible for the cinematography on the 2026 Apple TV series Last Seen .

== Influences ==
Elliott says that she has been inspired and influenced by a number of woman cinematographers, including Mandy Walker; Ellen Kuras (Eternal Sunshine of a Spotless Mind); French DP Maryse Alberti (The Wrestler); and Argentine cinematographer Natasha Braier. She also greatly admires the work of Harris Savides, who collaborated with filmmaker Gus Van Sant.

== Other activities ==
In August 2018, Elliott taught masterclasses in cinematography at the Melbourne International Film Festival.

In 2020, Elliott devised the concept for #whoisinyourcrew, a campaign to promote female representation in cinematography.

In 2022, she was on the panel of judges for the ACT Branch of the ACS Awards for Cinematography

== Recognition and awards ==
Elliott has won a number of ACS Awards, beginning with a National Award of Distinction as well as Gold, Bronze, and Highly Commended in the ACT/NSW Student Cinematography category in 2006, and then a Gold and a Bronze in the same category in 2007. She won a Bronze in the category Features – Cinema, for My Tehran for Sale in 2009; a Gold for Documentary for Sistagirl in 2011; a Silver for Dramatised Documentary for Recipe for Murder in the same year; and two short film awards, in the ACT/NSW ACS awards.

At the 2012 Sorta Unofficial New Zealand Film Awards, she won Best Short Film Cinematography for I'm the One.

In October 2016, Elliott was accredited by the Australian Cinematographers Society, then the 10th woman to receive the accreditation of the total number of 379 (by December 2019 there were 15).

In 2016, she was nominated for the AACTA Award for Best Cinematography for Spear at the 6th AACTA Awards. She was also nominated for the 2017 Best Cinematography award in the Film Critics Circle of Australia Awards and in the 10th Australian Film Critics Association Awards (Auscritic Awards).

In 2017, she won the AACTA Award for Best Cinematography in Television for "Joe", the second episode of Seven Types of Ambiguity.

At the 2018 Tallinn Black Nights Film Festival held in Tallinn, Estonia, Elliott was nominated for Best Cinematographer for Slam.

In 2018, renowned film critic David Stratton praised Elliott's "attractive photography" in his review of Undertow in The Australian.

In 2020, at the 10th AACTA Awards, she was nominated for the AACTA Award for Best Cinematography for H Is for Happiness, and won the AACTA Award for Best Cinematography in Television for "The Circumstances in Which They Come", the first episode of Stateless.

In 2021, she had three nominations at the 11th AACTA Awards – the AACTA Award for Best Cinematography in Television for "Everything's Gone", the second episode of Fires, and the AACTA Award for Best Cinematography in a Documentary for Freeman and Step into Paradise. Of these three, she won only the first award. Also in 2021, Elliott, along with Michael McDermott, was nominated in the Auscritic Awards for The Furnace.

In Comic Book Resources' review of Run Rabbit Run (2023), Josh Bell said that, as cinematographer, Elliott works with Daina Reid, the film's director, to "continue creating striking images even as the plot goes in circles".

=== Awards and nominations ===
Year	Title	Award	Result	Ref.
2012	I'm the One	Sorta Unofficial New Zealand Film Award for Best Short Film Cinematography	Won	
2016	Spear	AACTA Award for Best Cinematography	Nominated	
2017	Seven Types of Ambiguity, Episode: "Joe"	AACTA Award for Best Cinematography in Television	Won	
2020	H Is for Happiness	AACTA Award for Best Cinematography	Nominated	
2020	Stateless, Episode: "The Circumstances in Which They Come"	AACTA Award for Best Cinematography in Television	Won	
2021	Freeman	AACTA Award for Best Cinematography in a Documentary	Nominated	
2021	Step into Paradise	AACTA Award for Best Cinematography in a Documentary	Nominated	
2021	Fires, Episode: "Everything's Gone"	AACTA Award for Best Cinematography in Television	Won	

== Personal life ==
Elliott's partner is film editor Nick Meyers, who has edited several of the films she has worked on.
