= Virginia Martin (fashion designer) =

Australian fashion designer

Virginia Martin is an Australian fashion designer, creative director and entrepreneur.

== Personal life ==
After attending high school, Martin spent a year studying clothing production at RMIT University. Her interests in clothing and design were mainly influenced by her mother who doubled as her sewing teacher.

== Career ==
Martin started in the fashion industry at the age of 19 by founding her own label, búl, where she wholesaled for four years all over Australia. To gain more experience, she moved to New York City, United States where she interned with fashion designer Cynthia Rowley, fashion company Heatherette, and women's fashion brand Proenza Schouler. She also interned and later went on to become a design assistant at Trovata in California. In 2010, a year after returning to Australia, Martin relaunched búl.

In both 2014 and 2015, Martin became one of the finalists for the Tiffany & Co. National Designer Award.

In 2021, Martin became the creative director for Crumpler after acquiring it along with her father David Roper—cofounder and the co-owner of the same company from 1995 to 2014.
