= John Harvey (filmmaker) =

Australian filmmaker and theatre director and producer

John Harvey is an Australian writer, director, and producer of theatre and film. He is the creative director of independent theatre and film company, Brown Cabs. He is known for writing the plays The Return and Black Ties, and for several television documentaries, including the 2022 documentary about the Aboriginal Tent Embassy, Still We Rise, which he also directed. He produced the 2015 Indigenous drama film Spear, written and directed by Stephen Page. He has won several awards for his work, including two Australian Directors' Guild Awards.

== Early life ==
John Harvey's family is from Saibai Island in the Torres Strait Islands, but moved to mainland Australia in 1947 because of rising sea levels. He is also of English descent.

== Career ==
=== Theatre ===
Harvey worked at Kooemba Jdarra Indigenous Performing Arts in Brisbane, headed by Wesley Enoch from 1993 to 2007. He also worked at Access Arts with Indigenous inmates and people experiencing mental illness in Brisbane, and for some years worked on a petrol sniffing project with the Ngaanyatjarra, Pitjantjatjara and Yankunytjatjara Women's Council in Central Australia.

He presented his writing debut, My Heart Is a Wasteland, at Malthouse Theatre in 2017. The play toured nationally with Ilbijerri Theatre Company in 2022. He was general manager and co-CEO of Ilbijerri with Rachael Maza.

Harvey was co-writer, with Tainui Tukiwaho, of MFI (Major Festivals Initiative) show Black Ties, an Ilbijerri Theatre / Te Rehia co-production, which premiered at the 2020 Sydney Festival, where it sold out, and also sold out at Arts Centre Melbourne, Perth Festival, and Auckland Arts Festival.

He directed and presented A Little Piece of Heaven, the story of Wiradjuri Elders Uncle Dick and Aunty Ruth Carney as part of Yirramboi Festival in 2019.

In 2020 Harvey started writing The Return, which was co-commissioned by Malthouse Theatre and RISING festival. The premiere was planned for August 2020, but was cancelled on account of the COVID-19 pandemic. Instead, the production premiered on 13 May 2022, at the Merlyn Theatre in the Malthouse, as part of the RISING Festival. The play was directed by Jason Tamiru and Matthew Lutton, and starred Jimi Bani. Described as "An epic, 250-year story to return home the captive bodily remains of First Peoples", in 2023 the play won the Victorian Premier's Literary Award for Drama, and it was nominated for an AWGIE Award in 2024. Sean Ryan played didgeridu, while Tamiru performed on yidaki, clapsticks, and vocals.

In 2025, Harvey and Isaac Drandic are co-creating the play Dear Son based on the 2021 book of the same name by Torres Strait Islander author Thomas Mayo. For the book, Mayo invited 12 Indigenous Australian contributors, including journalist Stan Grant, musician Troy Cassar-Daley, and artist Blak Douglas, to write a letter to their son, father, or nephew "about life, masculinity, love, culture, and racism". The play, featuring Jimi Bani and Trevor Jamieson, plays at Bille Brown Theatre in Brisbane from 23 June until 19 July, then at the Odeon Theatre in Norwood, Adelaide, from 25 July until mid-August. This world premiere is being co-produced by Queensland Theatre and State Theatre Company South Australia.

=== Film and television ===
Harvey wrote and directed the short drama Water (2017) for the ABC, which screened at Melbourne International Film Festival (MIFF), Adelaide Film Festival, ImagineNATIVE Film and Media Arts Festival in Toronto. His next short drama film, Out of Range (2019; for SBS), screened at MIFF, Tampere Film Festival in Finland, and St Kilda Film Festival, winning Best Indigenous Short Film there.

He produced the chapter "Sand" for the 2013 anthology feature film of Tim Winton's 2004 collection of short stories, The Turning, which premiered at the Berlinale and Melbourne International Film Festival. He produced the 2015 feature film Spear, directed by Stephen Page, which premiered at the Toronto International Film Festival and Adelaide Film Festival, and in 2017 produced the ABC TV comedy-drama series The Warriors.

In 2020–2021 Harvey co-directed (with Rhian Skirving) the docu-series Off Country for NITV, which screened in 2022 as part of NAIDOC Week. Originally conceived as a feature documentary, the four-part series follows seven Indigenous high school students from around Australia who have left their families to study at the Geelong Grammar School in Victoria, over the course of a year in 2020. The series was filmed during the COVID-19 pandemic, which meant that the school year was not a typical school year, and filming was particularly restricted by lockdowns in Victoria. The Sydney Morning Herald's Kylie Northover gave a good review, giving the series four stars out of five. Skirving and Harvey received the 2022 ADG Award for Best Direction in a TV or SVOD Documentary Series Episode or Documentary One-Off for the series.

Harvey was director and co-producer of Kutcha's Koorioke docu-series about Mutti Mutti songman Kutcha Edwards for NITV, which ran for two series, in 2019 and 2022. Season 2 consists of 10 episodes of 7 minutes each, and designed to be also viewed in one screening. Harvey has also directed and/or produced a number of short form documentaries and films which have been screened at international film festivals and national television.

Harvey wrote and directed the television special documentary Still We Rise, which looks at the Aboriginal Tent Embassy 50 years on. It was screened at the Sharjah Biennial in the United Arab Emirates and won Best Documentary / Factual Single at the AIDC Awards as well as the 2023 ADG Award for Best Direction in a TV or SVOD Documentary Series Episode or Documentary One-Off. It aired on ABC Television in Australia in December 2022.

Harvey wrote, directed and produced the 12-minute short film Katele (Mudskipper), which won Best Australian Short Film at both Flickerfest and MIFF in 2023.

=== Art installations ===
In 2011 Harvey collaborated with artist Ricardo Idagi on a work that won the New Media Award in the Telstra Indigenous Art Awards.

In 2020 he was commissioned by Australian Centre for the Moving Image (ACMI) in Melbourne to create a multi-channel installation for their newly renovated building. Canopy was installed in January 2021 as a large street mural in the City Square (Melbourne), and will be on permanent display at ACMI's centrepiece exhibition, The Story of the Moving Image. He described the work as conveying his connection to Country, which is felt by many Indigenous Australians.

== Brown Cabs ==
Harvey is founding director of Brown Cabs theatre company. The company has been company in residence at Footscray Community Arts since 2012.

== Recognition and awards ==
Harvey was awarded the Malcolm Robertson Foundation Writer's inaugural Playwright in Residence at Footscray Community Arts, and in 2024 he was nominated for life membership of the organisation.

He has won several awards for film and television direction.

== Other activities ==
Harvey has worked as a peer assessor for the Theatre Board and was a member of the Community Cultural Development Board of the Australia Council (now Creative Australia).

Harvey has co-curated the Black Screen program with Moondani Balluk of Victoria University, and supported Footscray Community Arts Indigenous cultural program, as well as First Nations artists and members of the community.

As of March 2025 Harvey serves as member of the Bangarra Dance Theatre board.

== Personal life ==
His partner is artist and musician Lydia Fairhall, and they have children.

== Selected works ==
=== Theatre ===
- Jack Charles VS. The Crown (producer)
- Songlines of a Mutti Mutti Man (producer)
- The Dirty Mile (producer)
- Sisters of Gelam (producer)
- My Lover's Bones (producer)
- Heart Is a Wasteland (2017; writer)
- The Return (2020; writer)
- Black Ties (2020; writer)

=== Film ===
- Water (2017; writer, director)
- Out of Range (2019; writer, director)
- The Turning, "Sand" (2013; producer)
- Spear (2015; producer)
- Still We Rise (2022; writer, director)
- Katele / Mudskipper (2023; writer, director and producer)

=== Television ===
- Kutcha's Koorioke (2019, 2022; director, co-producer)
- The Warriors (2017; producer)
- Off Country (2021; writer, director, producer)
