= Spear (film) =

2015 film

- Poster for Spear
- Directed by: Stephen Page
- Written by: Stephen Page
- Produced by: John Harvey
- Starring: Hunter Page-Lochard
- Cinematography: Bonnie Elliott
- Release dates: 11 September 2015 (TIFF); 15 October 2015 (AFF, Australia)
- Running time: 84 minutes
- Country: Australia
- Language: English

Spear is a 2015 Australian drama and dance film directed by choreographer Stephen Page.

== Cast ==
- Hunter Page-Lochard as Djali
- Aaron Pedersen as Suicide Man
- Troy Honeysett as White Man
- Djakapurra Munyarryun as Big Man

== Production ==
Originally performed on stage by the Bangarra Dance Theatre in 2000 under the title Skin, Spear was reimagined for film using mostly dance and movement.

Spear was written and directed by Stephen Page, father of Hunter Page-Lochard, and produced by John Harvey. Dancer and choreographer Daniel Riley worked as director's attachment and played a small part in the film.

Bonnie Elliott was responsible for cinematography

== Release ==
Spear was screened in the Discovery section of the 2015 Toronto International Film Festival.

It had its Australian premiere at the Adelaide Film Festival in October 2015 and was screened in the Sydney Festival in January 2016.

== Awards and nominations ==
- Special Mention, Cultural Diversity Award under the patronage of UNESCO, Asia Pacific Screen Awards 2015
- Nominee, Best Cinematography (Bonnie Elliott), 6th AACTA Awards
- Nominee, Best Costume Design (Jennifer Irwin), 6th AACTA Awards
- Nominee, Panavision Spirit Award for Independent Cinema, 2016 Santa Barbara International Film Festival
- Nominee, Best Cinematography (Bonnie Elliott), 2017 Film Critics Circle of Australia Awards
- Nominee, Best Cinematography (Bonnie Elliott), 2017 Australian Film Critics Association Awards
