= Ronnie Kerr =

American actor (born 1974)

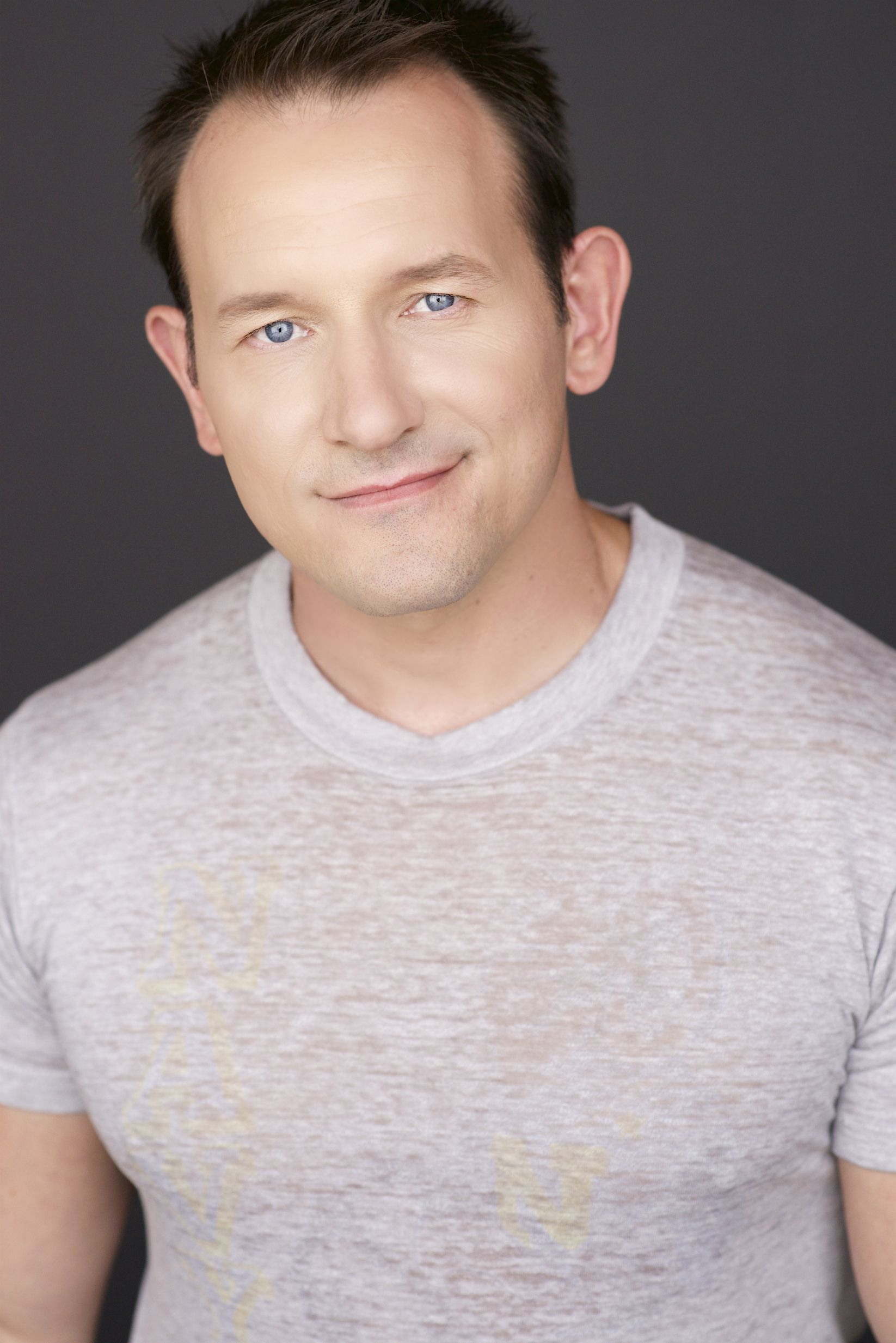
- Born: Ronald George Smith III; 30 March 1974 (age 52); Pompton Plains, New Jersey U.S.
- Occupations: Actor, Writer, Producer
- Years active: 1987–present

Ronnie Kerr (born Ronald George Smith III, 30 March 1974) is an American actor, writer, and producer, best known for playing the role of Romeo in The Army Show and the movie Shut Up and Kiss Me in 2010. He has also starred in many other films and been a personal trainer to several celebrity clients. His first TV role was in NYPD Blue in 2001.

== Early and personal life ==
He was born as Ronald George Smith III in Pompton Plains, New Jersey. He went to Southwestern Oklahoma State University with a full tennis scholarship but then injured his ankle. While rehabilitating, he started using the gym more frequently and carried on with fitness training.

He was then publicly outed in July 2007 when he was spotted in a Chicago gay bar with newly out basketball player John Amaechi.

== Career ==
He moved to Los Angeles in 1996, to act in his first action film Absolute Aggression (also starring Robert Davi), which led to other film roles.

In 2006, he appeared on the cover of the book The Superhero's Closet by H. Andrew Lynch.

He was still acting, and appeared in the third and final series of The Ultimate Coyote Ugly Search, when he started working on a web series called Flab2Fab! in which he trained gym clients.

In 2008, he wrote a fitness column for the Canadian magazine abOUT before it ceased operations in 2011.

In 2011, he moved to San Diego, as many of his friends had already moved there and formed his own production company, Kerrdog Productions.

In 2015, he wrote a film titled Please Don't Eat the Pansies. In 2016, an Indiegogo campaign was launched to help raise $35,000 to fund the movie. The cast included Mary Wilson of The Supremes, singer/actor Tom Goss and Andrew Lauer.

He was voted one of the top three trainers in Denver, Colorado by Mile High Sports Magazine and one of the top two trainers in Dallas, Texas by the Dallas Voice.

== Filmography ==
=== Films ===
Year	Film	Role	Director	Notes
2018	The Dawn	Detective Wilson	Brandon Slagle	
2017	Gangster Land	Frank Rio	Timothy Woodward, Jr.	
2015	When The Time Is Right	Bobo	Logan Cross	
2013	Vampire Boys 2: The New Brood	Judah	Steven Vasquez	
2012	Legalize Love	spokesman on a gay marriage campaign	Luke Montgomery	Part of the Legalizelove.com campaign
2012	Saltwater	Will Baston	Charlie Vaughn	With Ian Roberts and singer/songwriter Justin Utley
2012	The 49th Line	Jeff	Drew O'Kane	Stars with Christopher Stapleton and Mike Korich
2012	Counter Culture (TV Movie)	Tate	Ted Wass	
2010	Shut Up and Kiss Me	Ben	Devin Hamilton	Kerr wrote, acted and produced this film
2008	Daydream Obsession 3: Legacy	Greg	Thomas R. Smyth	
2006	Love Life	Stranger in park	Damion Dietz	
2006	Can't Buy Me Love	Jack Thompson	Todd Wilson	Short 20-minute film, won the Dallas OUT TAKES Best Short Film of 2006
2006	Sinful	Jim	Tony Marsiglia	Also stars Misty Mundae
2006	Getting It Straight	Billy the cocktail waiter (credited as 'Ron Smith')	Brian Michael Pelletier	Also stars Charlene Tilton
2005	Regarding Billy	Billy	Jeff London	Also features Jack Sway and Jason Van Eman
2005	No Match Found	Kevin	Brian Pelletier	Short 90 min debut from writer/director Brian as part of his screenwriting class at Los Angeles Valley College
2002	Out of Sync	George	Robert Pena	
2001	Facing the Enemy	Man on the street (uncredited)	Robert Malenfant	
2000	Lesson of the Assassin	Assassin #1	James Glenn Dudelson	
1999	Pit of Vipers	Montana Joe	Joel M. Rice	Also stars Mark Schrier, Dion DeRizzo and Elizabeth Johnson
1998	Shampoo Horns	Bartender	Manuel Toledano	
1997	Cyber Vengeance	Nazi Major (uncredited role)	J. Christian Ingvordsen	Stars Robert Davi
1996	Absolute Aggression	Lugosi	J. Christian Ingvordsen	Stars Robert Davi

=== Television ===
Year	Title	Role	Director	Notes
2016	Days of Our Lives	Longshoreman	Steven Williford	
2016	Where The Bears Are	Chase Hansen	Joe Dietl	
2016	Betrayed	Detective Dennis Fitzgerald	Yoram Astakhan	
2016	The Coroner: I Speak for the Dead	Trooper Smith	Erik Weigel	
2016	Boystown	Dex, 5 episodes in Season 2	Ricky Reilding	Shown on OutTV
2012	Counter Culture	Tate	Ted Wass	
2007	DanceLife			
2003-2005	Merge	Resident carpenter		
2001	NYPD Blue	E.M.T.		
1999	V.I.P.	Boxing Handler in "Raging Val"		
1998-1999	Sister, Sister	Music Student #1		2 episodes in Season 6, "Before There Was Hip Hop" (1999) and "Greek to Me" (1998)
1998	The Army Show	Romeo		First season

=== As a producer ===
Year	Film	Note
2014	Satanicus	
2014	Paranormal Ghost Hunters Case Files: Bam the Ghost	
2014	The Visible Man	
2013	Fork You	
2013	Creep Creepersin's Dracula	
2013	Awesome Girl Gang Street Fighter	
2013	Gritty	
2012	Saltwater	
2010	Shut Up and Kiss Me	

== Other work ==
Kerr also had a bit part in the music video for George Strait's song "Don't Make Me Come Over There and Love You", filmed in 2000.
