= Matt Zurbo =

Australian writer

- Born: July 17, 1967 (age 59); Melbourne, Victoria, Australia
- Writing career
- Genres: Children's literature, young adult fiction, sports journalism
- Website: www.mattzurbo.com/home.html

Matt Zurbo (born 17 July 1967) is an Australian writer of children's literature, young adult fiction, sports writer and novelist.

== Early life and career ==
Matt Zurbo grew up in the inner north of Melbourne, before moving to the Otway Ranges, where he worked in the bush and wrote for most of his adult life.

Matt's first works to be published were short stories in Pascoe Publishing. His first full work was in 1996 with his children's picture book, entitled Blow Kid Blow!, by Penguin Books and illustrated by Mambo artist Jeff Raglus. He also self-published a book of poetry, entitled Writing By Moonlight.

In 1997 Zurbo along with illustrator Dean Gorissen published his second picture book entitled I Got a Rocket!. It was later turned into an animated TV series of the same name by SLR Productions and won the 2008 Emmy Award for new approaches, daytime children's programming. He also released his first young-adult novels in 1997, with Idiot Pride and Flyboy and the Invisible, both published by Penguin Books. Idiot Pride was a short-list nominee for the 1998 Children's Book of the Year Award: Older Readers award and went on to be listed in Victoria's 150 Greatest Books List as a part of that state's 150 year celebrations.

In 2004 he released his third young-adult novel, entitled Hot Nights, Cool Dragons which was a runner-up for the 2004 Aurealis Award for best young-adult novel. He also released a compilation CD of the same name, featuring artists including Cris Wilson, Tony Gould, Vasco Era, the Exotics and Gian Slatter, bands that inspired parts of the book.

In 2008 Zurbo returned to children's picture books, releasing three with publisher Hachette. Fred the Croc, with Sarah Dunk and Lulu's Wish with Ben de Quadros-Wander. In 2009 he teamed up with Dean Gorissen again to produce My Dad's a Wrestler, based loosely on his stand-up comedy character, the Perculator. He then moved to Windy Hollow Books, releasing Tommy Tuckers (2012), a collection of three short children's stories with Alex Tyers. His next children's book, I Love Footy, painted by himself, was released in 2013. Matt's last book with Windy Hollow was Moon (2016), illustrated by Sadami Konchi.

Zurbo spent 3 years travelling around Australia working and interviewing 141 famous and infamous AFL/VFL football legends from the 1940s to the present day, for his 700-page book, Champions All, an Oral History of AFL/VFL Football, published by Five Mile Press, 2016.

Utilising the 20 best interviews from Champions All, a more streamlined, personal history, Heart & Soul, was compiled through Slattery Media Group in 2019.

In 2018 Matt set out to write 365 children's stories in 365 days, and publish them for free, on the internet, as an ode to his baby girl, Cielo, whom the project was named after. This challenge took place while his bush work took him from jobs in the tropical Daintree rainforest, through the Outback, to the temperate mountains of Victoria, and, finally, to Southern Tasmania, where, in order to finish Cielo, he took up work in Oyster farming.

The New York Times did a feature piece in the Cielo 365 project, making Matt's work known around the world.

He currently has two children's books pending with Macmillan.

Matt has been a feature writer for The Footy Almanac for ten years.

== Personal life ==
Zurbo has played over 650 games of Australian rules football across four states and is still playing today. He did a comedy-radio show as a bloated ex-wrestler called The Perculator, several years of stand-up and comedy festival between 2002 and 2005. He formed a band that never left his lounge room, and he is also known for his rainforest regeneration.

He is currently living on the road with his Venezuelan wife, Elena, and child, Cielo, pursuing his bush work, while writing his next novel.

== Bibliography ==
=== Children's fiction ===
- Blow Kid Blow! (1996, illustrated by Jeff Raglus)
- I Got a Rocket! (1997, illustrated by Dean Gorrissen)
- My Dad's a Wrestler (2009, illustrated by Dean Gorissen)
- Lu-Lu's Wish (2008, illustrated by Ben de Quadros-Wander)
- Fred the Croc (2008, illustrated by Sarah Dunk)
- Tommy Tuckers (2012, illustrated by Alex Tyers)
- I Love Footy (2013, illustrated by Matt Zurbo)
- Moon (2016, illustrated by Sadami Konchi)

=== Poetry ===
- Writing by Moonlight (1996)

=== Young-adult novels ===
- Flyboy and the Invisible (1997)
- Idiot Pride (1997)
- Hot Nights, Cool Dragons (2004)

=== Journalism ===
- The Footy Almanac - column (2011–)
- Veri.Live (2011–)

=== Sports writing ===
- Champions All, an Oral History of AFL/VFL Football (2016)
- Heart and Soul (2019)

== Nominations ==
Aurealis Awards

- Best young-adult novel
  - 2004: Nomination: Hot Nights, Cool Dragons

Children's Book Council of Australia Book of the Year Award

- Older Readers
  - 1998: Shortlisted: Idiot Pride
