= Crumpler (surname) =

Crumpler is a surname. Notable people with the surname include:

- Alge Crumpler (born 1977), an American football player
- Carlester Crumpler (born 1971), an American football player
- Larry Crumpler, a geologist and volcanologist
- Rebecca Lee Crumpler (1831–1895), an American physician
