= 2012 Sorta Unofficial New Zealand Film Awards =

- Awarded for: Excellence in New Zealand film
- Sponsored by: The New Zealand Herald and Rialto Channel
- Date: 4 December 2012
- Location: Civic Wintergarden, Auckland
- Country: New Zealand
- Presented by: Ant Timpson and Hugh Sundae
- First award: 2012
- Website: http://www.nzfilmawards.co.nz

Television/radio coverage
- Network: Rialto Channel

The 2012 Sorta Unofficial New Zealand Film Awards was the first presentation for the Sorta Unofficial NZ Film Awards, a New Zealand film industry award.

Following the demise of the Aotearoa Film and Television Awards and the announcement that the Screen Directors Guild of New Zealand would not hold film awards in 2012, New Zealand film industry figure Ant Timpson and nzherald.co.nz online entertainment editor Hugh Sundae announced the formation of the Sorta Unofficial New Zealand Film Awards, also known as the Moas.

The inaugural awards ceremony took place at the Civic Wintergarden in Auckland on 4 December 2012 and was webcast at the nzherald.co.nz, and broadcast on the Rialto Channel on 16 December 2012.

== Nominees and winners ==
Moas were awarded in 26 categories in three groups – feature film, documentary film and short film. The 2012 Moas cover the period of 15 August 2011 to 29 September 2012 for feature films and short films, and 1 August 2011 to 29 September 2012 for documentaries. Nominees were announced on 5 November 2012, with The Orator and Two Little Boys receiving 11 nominations each.

The Orator won eight awards in feature film categories, including Best Film. In the documentary categories, Shihad: Beautiful Machine won two awards, and the short film category was dominated by Honk If You're Horny, winning three of the six award categories.

=== Feature Film ===
Best Film

- The Orator
  - How to Meet Girls From a Distance
  - Two Little Boys
  - Good For Nothing
  - The Most Fun You Can Have Dying

Best Self-Funded Film

- The Red House
  - Netherwood
  - Good For Nothing
  - We Feel Fine

Best Director

- Tusi Tamasese – The Orator
  - Dean Hewison – How to Meet Girls From a Distance
  - Mike Wallis – Good For Nothing
  - Robert Sarkies – Two Little Boys

Best Editing

- Annie Collins – Two Little Boys
  - Simon Price – The Orator
  - Greg Daniels – Good For Nothing

Best Cinematography

- Crighton Bone – The Most Fun You Can Have Dying
  - Leon Narbey – The Orator
  - Jac Fitzgerald – Two Little Boys

Best Actor

- Fa'afiaula Sagote – The Orator
  - Richard Falkner – How to Meet Girls From a Distance
  - Bret McKenzie – Two Little Boys
  - Matt Whelan – The Most Fun You Can Have Dying

Best Actress

- Tausili Pushparaj – The Orator
  - Tandi Wright – Kiwi Flyer
  - Inge Rademeyer – Good For Nothing
  - Madeleine Sami – Sione's 2: Unfinished Business

Best Supporting Actor

- Will Hall – Netherwood
  - John Bach – Rest for the Wicked
  - Jonathan Brugh – How to Meet Girls From a Distance

Best Supporting Actress

- Salamasina Mataia – The Orator
  - Aidee Walker – How to Meet Girls From a Distance
  - Jessica Joy Wood – Sione's 2: Unfinished Business

Best Screenplay

- Tusi Tamasese – The Orator
  - Dean Hewison, Richard Falkner and Sam Dickson – How to Meet Girls From a Distance
  - Duncan Sarkies and Robert Sarkies – Two Little Boys

Best Visual Effects

- Jon Baxter and Puck Murphy – Two Little Boys
  - Steve Cronin and Paul Story – Good For Nothing
  - Frank Rueter and Jake Lee – The Devil's Rock

Best Costume Design

- Kirsty Cameron – The Orator
  - Tristan McCallum – The Devil's Rock
  - Amanda Neale – Two Little Boys

Best Makeup Design

- Davina Lamont, Sean Foot and Richard Taylor – The Devil's Rock
  - Linda Wall – Two Little Boys
  - Ryk Fortuna – Good For Nothing

Best Production Design

- Bruce Everard – The Most Fun You Can Have Dying
  - Jules Cook – Two Little Boys
  - Rob Astley, Roger Guise and Pouoa Malae Lialia'i – The Orator

Best Score

- Grayson Gilmour – The Most Fun You Can Have Dying
  - Don McGlashan and Dawn Raid – Sione's 2: Unfinished Business
  - David Long – The Red House
  - Tim Prebble – The Orator

Best Sound

- Tim Prebble, Chris Todd, Richard Flynn, Mike Hedges and Gilbert Lake – The Orator
  - Dave Whitehead – Two Little Boys
  - Myk Farmer, Steve Finnigan and Chris Burt – Sione's 2: Unfinished Business

=== Documentary film ===
Best Documentary

- Maori Boy Genius
  - Pictures of Susan
  - How Far is Heaven
  - The Last Dogs of Winter
  - Shihad: Beautiful Machine

Best Director

- Sam Peacocke – Shihad: Beautiful Machine
  - Dan Salmon – Pictures of Susan
  - Miriam Smith and Christopher Pryor – How Far is Heaven
  - Costa Botes – The Last Dogs of Winter
  - Pietra Brettkelly – Maori Boy Genius

Best Cinematography

- Christopher Pryor – How Far is Heaven
  - Ben Freedman – Pictures of Susan
  - Peter Young – The Last Ocean

Best Editing

- Cushla Dillon – Shihad: Beautiful Machine
  - Christopher Pryor and Cushla Dillon – How Far is Heaven
  - Jonno Woodford-Robinson and Richard Lord – The Last Ocean
  - Richard Lord and Ken Sparks – When a City Falls

=== Short film ===
Best Short

- Honk If You're Horny
  - Home
  - Lambs
  - Whakatiki
  - I'm the One

Best Self-Funded Short

- In Safe Hands
  - Dr Grordbort Presents: The Deadliest Game
  - The Girl With The Clover Tattoo
  - Brothers
  - Swansong

Best Script

- Joe Lonie – Honk If You're Horny
  - Sam Kelly – Lambs
  - Paola Morabito – I'm The One

Best Actor

- Andy Anderson – Honk If You're Horny
  - Waka Rowlands – Lambs
  - Jim Moriarty – Whakatiki

Best Actress

- Mabelle Dennison – Whakatiki
  - Maya Stange – I'm The One
  - Anapela Polataivao – Night Shift

Best Cinematography

- Bonnie Elliott – I'm the One
  - Andrew Stroud – Ellen Is Leaving
  - Ari Wegner – Night Shift
