= Saltwater (2012 film) =

- Movie poster of Saltwater
- Directed by: Charlie Vaughn
- Written by: Ronnie Kerr
- Produced by: Ronnie Kerr; Ron Pieket; Joe Staffa; Ian Stark; Colin Trail (all via Kickstarter)
- Starring: Ronnie Kerr; Ian Roberts; Justin Utley
- Cinematography: Roger Viloria
- Edited by: Roger Viloria
- Music by: John Munt
- Production company: Kerrdog Productions
- Distributed by: Ariztical Entertainment
- Release date: July 15, 2012
- Running time: 81 min.
- Country: United States
- Language: English
- Budget: $10,000

Saltwater is a 2012 film directed by Charlie Vaughn. It was written and produced by Ronnie Kerr, who also acted in the film. It was funded by Kickstarter. The executive producer was Michael Shoel and line producer was Creep Creepersin.

Saltwater premiered on July 14, 2012, at the 18th Annual Philadelphia QFest. Qfest is the east coast's largest LGBT film festival and the third largest of its kind in the nation. Saltwater played to a sold-out crowd in the Ritz Bourse theater. It also played to a near, sold-out crowd the next day at the Ritz East.

In 2005, an ex-Marine, who had many friends, including Ronnie, and a boyfriend, committed suicide to the surprise of many, but left no suicide note or explanation. This real-life tragedy inspired Saltwater. Filming took place in various locations in North Hollywood, Sherman Oaks and San Diego.

Former rugby league player, now actor, Ian Roberts said, "I chose Saltwater as the first film in which I play a gay character because its content is something that’s very personal to me. It spoke to me in a way no other script has."

Justin Utley, who has been a friend of Ronnie for many years, was asked to use some of his music in the film, as he had used his music on a previous film. But later Justin flew to LA and over a weekend, acted in the movie.

The title, Saltwater, comes from one of the characters who tells a friend, "cure for anything is saltwater, which is (found in) tears, sweat or the sea."

It was filmed on a Red Scarlet camera.

== Plot ==
The low budget indie drama begins with Will (Ronnie Kerr), a gay officer in the U.S. Navy who leaves the armed forces. He then reconnects with his old friends, and begins to look for a new boyfriend to settle down with. His buddy Rich (Bruce L. Hart) attempts to fix him up with the sexy and handsome Josh (Ian Roberts), they have instant chemistry between the two, but their lives can never quite align. Then an unforeseen tragedy erupts that brings the two men together and forces them to respond in accord to the challenging situation before them.

== Cast ==
- Ronnie Kerr as Will Baston
- Ian Roberts as Josh
- Justin Utley as Joe
- Bruce L. Hart as Rich
- Berna Roberts as Christine
- Will Bethencourt as Mike
- Brent Alan Henry (credited as Brent Henry) as Jack
- Jonathan Camp as Shawn
- Justin Utley as Joe

Other cast members:

- Jonathan Brett as Hank
- Bryan Glick as Restaurant Patron
- Tenee Hill as Lawyer
- Derek Jameson as Tyler
- Jennifer Jones as Liz
- Russell Dennis Lewis as Collin
- Lawrence Nicols as Frank

== Reception ==
Bill Biss of EDGE Media Network praised Roberts' portrayal of "a roguish, sexy and an ultimately sensitive" lead hero. Anthony Glassman of Gay People Chronicle did not like the film, blaming the director for the "stilted and hackneyed" dialogue and editing problems.

== Other notes ==
The film played several film festivals before its DVD release. It also opened in Ian Roberts' native Australia in early 2013. The DVD was released on 31 December 2012.
