= Justin Utley =

American rock singer and songwriter (born 1976)

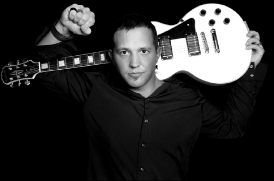
- Runaway Promo Pic

Background information
- Born: Justin Utley
- Origin: West Valley City, Utah, United States
- Genres: Rock, acoustic rock, folk, alt country, pop music,
- Occupations: Singer, Songwriter
- Instruments: Singer, piano, Acoustic Guitar, electric guitar
- Years active: 1996 - present
- Label: Kolob Records Times Squared Records
- Website: http://www.JustinUtley.com

Justin Utley (born c. 1976) is an American rock singer and songwriter.

== Biography ==
Born and raised in West Valley City, Utah, Justin Utley began his career as a Mormon-Contemporary singer/songwriter, touring throughout the west United States to mostly religious and faith-based audiences during the late-1990s. In 2002, he was a featured performer at the Salt Lake City 2002 Winter Olympics, and earned numerous awards during his time in Utah, including "Best Singer and Songwriter" by Salt Lake City Weekly and "Best New Artist" by Indie Review Monthly. The Utah native also composed and performed the theme song to the Emmy Award-winning PBS movie "The Shadow of Light", as well as other independent films.

Utley released his first-ever nationally distributed album Runaway on Kolob Records in November 2005 and a remix EP entitled Hold You + Remixes was released in April 2006, which included a live version of the title track recorded at the Javitz Center in New York City. After publicly breaking ties with the LDS Church and sending his own "self-excommunication letter", Justin became a noted activist and advocate for civil rights and LGBT equality in the United States, and an outspoken personality against the LDS church's use of conversion therapy, a method Utley endured for two years after serving a two-year full-time mission for the church. In June 2010, Utley released Stand for Something – a single written to inspire and motivate to take action towards securing LGBT equality in America, ending youth homelessness, and increasing community awareness. The single was nominated by the LGBT Academy Of Recording Arts for 4 OutMusic Awards, including Best Songwriter and Artist of the Year, winning Best Country/Folk Song of the Year. Another version of the single was released in October 2010 which included two additional live tracks and an acoustic version of songs from the album 'Runaway'.

Theatrically, his credits include a seven-month Utah regional run as "Joseph" in Joseph and the Amazing Technicolor Dreamcoat (2001–2002) and as leading man "Radames" in the Utah premiere of Elton John and Tim Rice's Broadway hit Aida (2005). Later, he would leave his Mormon-inherited religion behind, relocate to Manhattan and debut in the New York City theater scene as "Tommy Dautry" in the musical 'Our Country' (2009). The show garnered the Best Musical, and Justin as Best Actor awards for the Planet Connections Theater Festivity. The show went on to be featured in the New York Musical Theater Festival in the summer of 2010.

Justin's next full-length album, 'Nothing This Real', was released November 11, 2011 to critical acclaim.

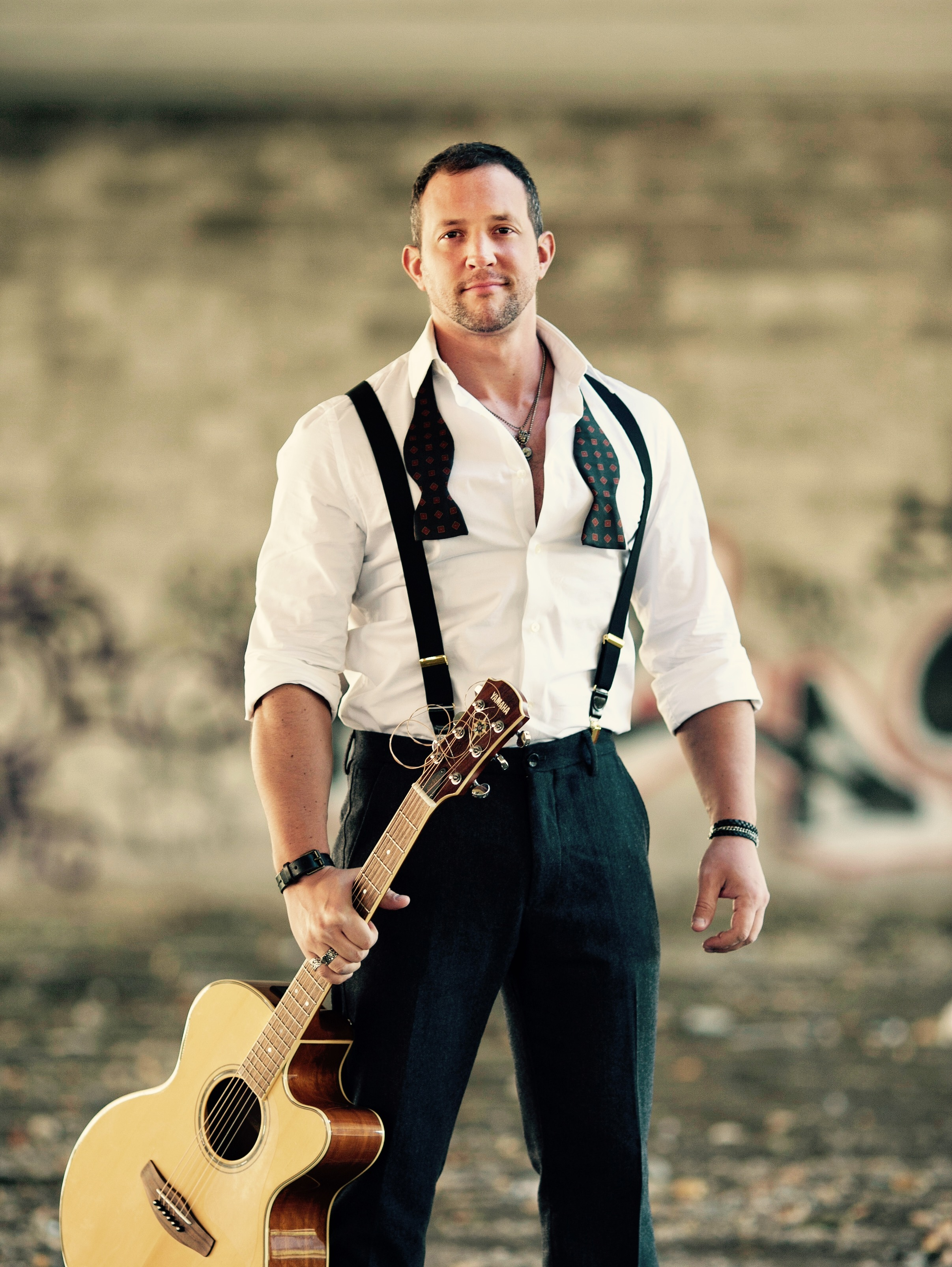
Utley in 2015

In 2012, actor Ronnie Kerr licensed some of Utley's music for his film, 'Saltwater'. Utley agreed, and flew to Los Angeles for a guest appearance in the film.

In July 2019, Utley released a new single "Survivors", a pop version of the orchestrated song featured from his third album, Scars, released September 10, 2020 (World Suicide Prevention Day) along with a music video to the title track.

== Discography ==
=== Studio albums ===
Title	Details
Simplicity	Released: 1996; Format: CD, Cassette
Runaway	Released: 2 December 2005; Label: Kolob Records; Format: Digital download, CD
Nothing This Real	Released: 9 November 2011; Label: Kolob Records; Format: Digital download, CD
Scars	Released: 9 September 2019; Label: Times Squared Records; Format: Digital download, CD

=== Extended plays ===
Title	Details
Almost August	Released: 1994; Label: Gandy Productions/Blockbuster Music; Format: Cassette
Six Songs Plus One	Released: 2000; Label: 1to3 Records; Format: Compact Disc
Hold You + Remixes	Released: 2006; Label: Kolob Records; Format: CD, Digital download
Stand For Something	Released: 2010; Label: Kolob Records; Format: CD, Digital download

=== Singles ===
Title	Year	Album
"Stand For Something"	2010	Non-album single
"Survivors - Single Version"	2019	Non-album single

=== Other appearances ===
Title	Year	Notes
Shadow Of Light Motion Picture Soundtrack	2002	Theme song
Day Of Defense Motion Picture Soundtrack	2003	Featured performer, 'Stand for Something'
