= Thomas Bromhead =

Australian actor

- Occupations: Actor; comedian; musician
- Years active: 1987–1996 (musician); 1996–present (acting)
- Website: tombrom.com

Thomas Bromhead is an Australian actor, comedian and musician. He is best known for playing the part of Rocket in the Emmy award-winning series I Got a Rocket!.

Bromhead's natural dialects are English US, British and Australian.

He is also known for being an impressionist.

== Career ==
Bromhead grew up in England and Australia. He resides in the U.S. He has performed in over 1000 commercial, promotional and game voiceovers, including the Australian promo voice for KidsCo.

Bromhead went to Melbourne High School and has a degree in economics from Monash University.

Thomas was also a professional musician (trumpet and singing) performing with various Australian military bands. He trained in drama at Richmond Drama School in London and in improvisation at The Second City in Los Angeles. He has appeared in numerous commercials including an infamous Continental Sauces commercial with Mena Suvari and a Virgin Mobile commercial with Jane Lynch. He has also appeared in two Super Bowl commercials. In 2003 for Washington Mutual (with Scott Adsit) and in 2011 for Bridgestone's "Reply All". As a stand-up comedian, he has performed in London, Kuala Lumpur, Sydney and Los Angeles.

He has also voiced the Geico Gecko.

In January 2024, Bromhead was voicing Mark Steyn in a podcast concerning Steyn's defence against charges of defamation at the Superior Court of the District of Columbia.

== Filmography ==
=== Live action roles ===
==== Films ====
- Bigger Than Tina – Additional role

==== Television ====
Year	Title	Role	Distributor	Source
2019	I Think you should Leave with Tim Robinson	Security Guard	Netflix	
2018	Counterpart	Taylor	Starz	
2018	The Good Place	Strange Man	NBCUniversal Television Distribution	
2017	Henry Danger	Alan	Nickelodeon	
2000	The Big Schmooze	Survivor Host	The Comedy Channel	
2000	Dogwoman: A Grrrl's Best Friend	Video Shop Assistant	Nine Network	
1999	SeaChange	Home Bidder	ABC TV	
1998	Stingers	Bottle Shop Attendant	Channel 9	
1997	Neighbours	Frank	Channel 10	
1996	Blue Heelers	Brendon	Channel 7	

=== Voice roles ===
==== Film ====
Year	Title	Role	Distributor
2022	The Sea Beast	Additional Voices	Netflix
2021	The Hyperions	Announcer/additional voices	Millimeter Films
2021	Belle	Additional Voices	GKids Films
2021	Pompo the Cinephile	President	GKids Films
2021	Thresh Unbound: A Night at the Inn	Innkeeper	Riot Games
2020	Escape Through Africa	Additional Voices	Lux Libertas Entertainment
2019	The Angry Birds Movie 2	Additional Voices	Sony Pictures
2017	Burn Out	Miguel (English version)	Netflix
2017	Thor: Ragnarok	Additional Voices	Marvel
2017	Overwatch: Rise and Shine	Scientist	Blizzard
2017	Junkertown: The Plan	Guard	Blizzard
2017	The Mummy	ADR Performer	Universal
2016	Mechanic: Resurrection	ADR Loop Group	
2016	The Angry Birds Movie	ADR Loop Group	Sony Pictures
2015	Seclusion	Prescott	
2013	Saving Mr Banks	Loop Troop	Disney
2012	Pablo	Animatic Voices	
2008	Offing David	Tennis Announcer	
2006	Footy Legends	Additional Voices	
2001	Just Not Cricket	Commentator	

==== Television animation ====
Year	Title	Role	Distributor	Source
2023	Hamster and Gretel	Australian Dundee	Disney+	
2022	Cars on the Road	Cap'n Long Leggy	Disney+	
2020	Earwig and the Witch	Cook	HBO	
2020	BNA	Iwasaki	Netflix	
2019	We Bare Bears	Baker	CN	
2019	Piano no Mori	Jozeph	Netflix	
2018	The Tom and Jerry Show	Dr Jake L Hyde	CN	
2016	Ajin	Tomizawa	Netflix	
2014	Sofia the First	Sir Maxwell	Disney	
2014	Secret Millionaires Club	Julian	BangZoom	
2010	Important Things with Demetri Martin	Superman	Comedy Central	
2006	I Got a Rocket!	Rocket	Kabillion	
2006	Raggs	B Max	Southern Star	
2005	The Adventures of Napman	Napman	Nicktoons	

==== Video games ====
Year	Title	Role	Notes	Source
2025	Death Stranding 2: On the Beach	Old Oz		
2022	Call of Duty: Modern Warfare II	Additional Voices		
2022	Voodoo Detective	Victor Fontule		
2021	New World	Samuel Worthington Bloodgood III		
2021	Call of Duty: Vanguard	Additional Voices		
2019	Call of Duty: Modern Warfare	Raven, UK Fire Team, Daniel "Ronin" Shinoda		
2016	Skylanders: Imaginators	Drill Sergeant		
2016	World of Warcraft	Huntsman Blake		
2016	Overwatch	Aussie Football Announcer		
2015	Skylanders: SuperChargers	Drill Sergeant		
2015	Call of Duty Online	Author, Gamer, Wounded		
2014	Skylanders: Trap Team	Drill Sergeant		
2014	Transformers: Rise of the Dark Spark	Neutral Scientist		
2014	Wolfenstein: The New Order	Allied Pilot		
2014	Infamous: Second Son	Pedestrians		
2013	Lightning Returns: Final Fantasy XIII	Additional Voices		
2013	Skylanders: Swap Force	Drill Sergeant/Kangarat		
2013	Soul Sacrifice	Magusar		
2013	StarCraft II: Heart of the Swarm	Additional Voices		
2012	Skylanders: Giants	Drill Sergeant		
2012	Rise of The Guardians: The Video Game	Bunnymund		
2012	Fable: The Journey	Lobber/Rider		
2011	Skylanders: Spyro's Adventure	Dino-Rang, Drill Sergeant		
2010	White Knight Chronicles II	Red Captain		
2010	EA Sports MMA	Nigel Harris		
2009	Undead Knights	Jester, Ouroboros	Credited as Thomas Browmhead	
2008	Aion	Additional Voice		
