= Teenage Kicks (film) =

- Film poster
- Directed by: Craig Boreham
- Written by: Craig Boreham
- Produced by: Annmaree Bell
- Starring: Miles Szanto; Daniel Webber; Shari Sebbens; Charlotte Best
- Cinematography: Bonnie Elliott
- Edited by: Adrian Chiarella
- Music by: David Barber
- Production company: Azure Productions
- Release date: 11 June 2016 (Sydney)
- Running time: 98 minutes
- Country: Australia
- Language: English

Teenage Kicks is an Australian drama film, directed by Craig Boreham and released in 2016. It is a queer coming-of-age love story.

== Synopsis ==
Miklós Varga, the son of Hungarian immigrants to Australia, is struggling to come to terms with his sexual attraction to his best friend Dan, in the wake of having been indirectly responsible for his older brother Tomi's accidental death.

== Cast ==
- Miles Szanto as Miklós Varga
- Daniel Webber as Dan
- Nadim Kobeissi as Tomi
- Shari Sebbens as Annuska
- Charlotte Best as Phaedra
- Tony Poli as Miklós's father Viktor
- Anni Finsterer as Miklós's mother Illona
- Ian Roberts as Dan's father Jack

== Production ==
The film was directed by Craig Boreham, with cinematography by longtime collaborator and friend Bonnie Elliott. They had made the short film Drowning as a prelude to Teenage Kicks.

== Release ==
The film premiered in June 2016 at the 2016 Sydney Film Festival.

== Reception ==
Luke Buckmaster of The Guardian, giving the film 4 stars out of 5, wrote that Boreham was "a compelling new voice in queer Australian cinema", and praised Elliott's cinematography, saying it was "well suited to the unstable-feeling nature of the drama, helps pull the film away from social realist impulses to a more stylistic palette" and saying that she was "emerging – if she hasn’t already – as one of Australian cinema's finest sharp eyes".

The film was compared by some film critics to Head On, the 1998 film about a gay Greek Australian man.

== Accolades ==
Szanto won the award for Best Performance in a Male Role at the 2017 Iris Prize festival. Composer David Barber received an AACTA Award nomination for Best Original Music Score at the 6th AACTA Awards, and Boreham received an Australian Directors' Guild nomination for Best Direction in a Feature Film.
