= Craig Boreham =

Australian filmmaker

Craig Boreham is an Australian film director, producer, and screenwriter. He is known for his debut short film Transient, and the feature films Teenage Kicks (2016) and Lonesome (2022). His films focus on queer themes.

== Early life and education ==
Craig Boreham graduated attended the University of Technology Sydney at the same time as future collaborator and friend, cinematographer Bonnie Elliott.

In 2008, he graduated from the Australian Film Television and Radio School with a Graduate Diploma in Directing (Fiction & Non Fiction).

== Career ==
In February 2005 his short drama Transient, premiered in the Panorama section at the Berlin International Film Festival.

In 2008, LesGaiCineMad and Fundación Triángulo in Madrid, Spain, programmed a retrospective of Boreham's short films titled True Cinema Poison.

Boreham's short film Drowning, with cinematography by Bonnie Elliott, had its Australian premiere at the Flickerfest International Short Film Festival in December 2009 at Bondi Beach in Sydney. Drowning starred Australian actors Miles Szanto, Xavier Samuel, and Tess Haubrich. Drowning was the prelude to film Teenage Kicks, also a collaboration with Elliott, starring Miles Szanto and Daniel Webber, It premiered at the Sydney Film Festival in 2016.

In 2022 Lonesome was launched by M-Appeal at the Berlin Film Festival.

== Awards and nominations ==
- ?: Best film at My Queer Career, Mardi Gras Film Festival
- 2005: Nomination, Teddy Award for best short film at the Berlinale
- 2005: City of Melbourne Emerging Filmmaker for Best Australian Queer Short Film, at the 15th annual Melbourne Queer Film Festival, for his short film Transient.
- 2007: Best Independent Film, Newtown Flicks Short Film Festival, Sydney
- 2022: Nomination, 2022 AACTA Award for Best Indie Film, for Lonesome

== Filmography ==
- Seamen (1998) Director, Producer, Writer
- Blow (2000) Director, Writer
- Pink Sheep (2003) Director, Producer, Editor
- Transient (2005) Director, Writer
- Stray (2007) Co Director with Dean Francis, Producer
- Love Bite (2008) Director, Writer, Producer
- Before The Rain - Violet (2009) Director
- Drowning (2009) Director, Writer
- William Yang - The Art Of Seduction (2010) Director
- Ostia - La Notte Finale (2010) Director, Writer
- Teenage Kicks (2016) Director, Writer
- Lonesome (2022)
