= I Got a Rocket! =

- Title card
- Genre: Comedy; Science fiction
- Based on: I Got a Rocket! by Matt Zurbo
- Developed by: Stu Connolly; Ben Townsend
- Directed by: Glenn Kirkpatrick
- Voices of: Thomas Bromhead; Jamie Oxenbould; Marcello Fabrizi; Drew Forsythe; Trilby Glover; Rachel King
- Composers: Lars Löhn; Carsten Schmelzer
- Countries of origin: Australia; United States; Germany; South Korea; Singapore
- Original languages: German; English; Korean
- No. of seasons: 1
- No. of episodes: 26 (52 segments)

Production
- Executive producers: Suzanne Ryan; Bill Schultz; Mike Young; Liz Young; Sebastian Debertin; Marc Gabizon; Romi Roolf; Cherrie Bottger
- Producers: Suzanne Ryan; Cary Silver; Ben Townsend; Josh Fisher
- Running time: 24 minutes (Australian version, 13 minutes per segment); 23 minutes (US version, 12 minutes per segment)
- Production companies: SLR Productions; Mike Young Productions; MotionWorks; Europool; Peach Blossom Media; Sunwoo Entertainment

Original release
- Network: KI.KA (Germany); Nickelodeon and Network Ten (Australia); Kabillion (United States); Korean Broadcasting System (South Korea)
- Release: 1 December 2006 – 24 May 2007

I Got a Rocket! is an animated television series centred on a boy named Vincent "Vinnie", who receives an anthropomorphic rocket for his birthday. The rocket acts as a best friend to Vinnie and is fond of assisting him. The show is based on the book by Matt Zurbo. The show's run was from 1 December 2006 to 24 May 2007. Although the series was short-lived, it received a 2008 Emmy Award for "New Approaches - Daytime Children's Entertainment".

== Characters ==
=== Main characters ===
- Rocket (voiced by Thomas Bromhead): A hyperactive and eccentric rocket invented for Vinnie's birthday. Rocket is orange and blue (as in the book by Matt Zurbo), and fiercely relies on assistance, always prepared to assist Vinnie in a situation, although sometimes over-confident in episodes such as "Mackerel Mates". He always says "You Got it, V-Man!" whenever a situation involving Vinnie has occurred.
- Vincent Q/Vinnie (voiced by Jamie Oxenbould in Australia, and Thomas Bromhead in the U.S.): A 13-year-old boy who receives Rocket for his birthday. Vinnie converted into a hip, popular boy after the invention of Rocket. Despite his popularity at school, it is a recurring gag in the series that a trio of siblings named The Duckies give him a wedgie, and Vinnie is rather timid when face-to-face with the love of his life, Maya Kovsky.

=== Other ===
- Professor Quigley Q (voiced by Marcello Fabrizi): Vinnie's father and a genius. It is a recurring gag in the series that he uses scientific words in transitional phrases, including the word "degrees" in the phrase, "I'm proud of you, son!"
- Crystal Q (voiced by Rachel King): Vinnie's sister.
- Ma Ducky (voiced by Drew Forsythe): The ambitious mother of the bullying triplets known as The Duckys. She is the lunch lady and librarian of Vinnie's school, despises Vinnie and Rocket and ignores her children's bad behaviour.
- Biffo Ducky (voiced by Drew Forsythe): The largest, and most muscular of the Duckys.
- Scuds Ducky (voiced by Drew Forsythe): The least intelligent of the Duckys.
- Frankie Ducky (voiced by Rachel King): The leader and sole female of the Duckys.
- VP Stern (voiced by Marcello Fabrizi): The teacher and vice principal of the Inner City School, the school Vinnie, Gabby and Rainbow all study at.
- Gabby (voiced by Trilby Glover): A friend of Vinnie.
- Rainbow (voiced by Rachel King): Another friend of Vinnie.
- Maya Kovsky (voiced by Trilby Glover): Vinnie's love of his life, and also the waiter at Joe's Milk Bar, Vinnie's favourite restaurant.
- Captain O'Cheese/Pirate (voiced by Drew Forsythe): A pirate who drives a pirate ship on the streets.

== Episodes ==
| Series | Episodes | Originally released | |
| Series | Episodes | First released | Last released |
|---|---|---|---|
| 1 | 26 | 1 December 2006 | 24 May 2007 |

| No. in season | Title | Directed by | Written by | Original release date | Prod. code |
|---|---|---|---|---|---|
| 1 | "Three Strikes... You're Out!" / "Late Fees!" | Glenn Kirkpatrick | Ben Townsend | 1 December 2006 | 101 |
| 2 | "They Say It's Your Build Day!" / "Really, Really, Really Blind Date!" | Glenn Kirkpatrick | Ben Townsend | 8 December 2006 | 102 |
| 3 | "Vertigoing... Going... Gone!" / "Manners Maketh Rocket!" | Glenn Kirkpatrick | Ben Townsend; Jen Klein | 15 December 2006 | 103 |
| 4 | "Protection Rocket!" / "Rocket Rules!" | Glenn Kirkpatrick | Amy Keating Rogers; Ben Townsend | 22 December 2006 | 104 |
| 5 | "Rocket the Vote!" / "Good Deeds Done Dirt Cheap!" | Glenn Kirkpatrick | Ben Townsend; Joel Metzger | 29 December 2006 | 105 |
| 6 | "Three Feet High and Rising!" / "I Got a Remote!" | Glenn Kirkpatrick | Ben Townsend | 4 January 2007 | 106 |
| 7 | "Mackerel Mates" / "Not So Spare Parts!" | Glenn Kirkpatrick | Temple Matthews; Ben Townsend | 11 January 2007 | 107 |
| 8 | "Swollen Cranium" / "Tomorrow x3" | Glenn Kirkpatrick | Danielle Koenig; Ben Townsend | 18 January 2007 | 108 |
| 9 | "Rockin' Rocket" / "Viva Vroom" | Glenn Kirkpatrick | Cory Powell; Stu Connolly | 25 January 2007 | 109 |
| 10 | "Mistake Over!" / "No More Joe's!" | Glenn Kirkpatrick | Jen Klein; Ben Townsend | 1 February 2007 | 110 |
| 11 | "Writing on the Wall!" / "Biffo Blossoms!" | Glenn Kirkpatrick | Joel Metzger; Ben Townsend | 8 February 2007 | 111 |
| 12 | "Vices and Principles!" / "Space Camp!" | Glenn Kirkpatrick | Ben Townsend | 15 February 2007 | 112 |
| 13 | "The Tell-Tale Squid" / "Mayakovsky!" | Glenn Kirkpatrick | Ben Townsend | 22 February 2007 | 113 |
| 14 | "Genius Company Picnic!" / "Father to the Prof!" | Glenn Kirkpatrick | Bryan Thompson; Rob Hummel | 1 March 2007 | 114 |
| 15 | "Advinnies in Rocketsitting!" / "Date My Sister!" | Glenn Kirkpatrick | Rachel Spratt; Jaqueline Turner | 8 March 2007 | 115 |
| 16 | "The 39¼ Steps!" / "The Brunchfast Club!" | Glenn Kirkpatrick | Ben Townsend; Joel Metzger | 15 March 2007 | 116 |
| 17 | "Publish and Be Wedgied!" / "Hair Apparent!" | Glenn Kirkpatrick | Ben Townsend; Rachel Spratt | 22 March 2007 | 117 |
| 18 | "Rebirth of Cool!" / "Hypocritical Mass!" | Glenn Kirkpatrick | Ben Townsend; Rachel Spratt | 29 March 2007 | 118 |
| 19 | "Parent Substitute!" / "Body Double Booked!" | Glenn Kirkpatrick | Rob Hummel; Rachel Spratt | 5 April 2007 | 119 |
| 20 | "2 of the Girls!" / "Share and Share Unalike!" | Glenn Kirkpatrick | Jen Klein; Brian Thompson | 12 April 2007 | 120 |
| 21 | "Author! Author!" / "Shrodinger's Rocket!" | Glenn Kirkpatrick | Ben Townsend; Peter Lawrence | 19 April 2007 | 121 |
| 22 | "Retro Rocket!" / "0.9 of the Law" | Glenn Kirkpatrick | Peter Lawrence; Ben Townsend | 26 April 2007 | 122 |
| 23 | "Fly a Mile in My Boosters!" / "3 Stage Rocket" | Glenn Kirkpatrick | Ben Townsend; Rachel Spratt | 3 May 2007 | 123 |
| 24 | "Spaceship Earth!" / "I've Got a Vinnie Q!" | Glenn Kirkpatrick | Peter Lawrence; Ben Townsend | 10 May 2007 | 124 |
| 25 | "Truces and Consequences!" / "Rocket Roommates!" | Glenn Kirkpatrick | Rachell Spratt | 17 May 2007 | 125 |
| 26 | "Life: a User's Guide!" / "To Wedgie or Not to Wedgie!" | Glenn Kirkpatrick | Ben Townsend | 24 May 2007 | 126 |

== Broadcast ==
The show ran on Network Ten until 2009 in Australia. There were also reruns on ABC3 in 2013. Kabillion aired the show through its VOD service in the United States. The show ran on Disney Channel in the United Kingdom.
