= John Sencio =

American actor

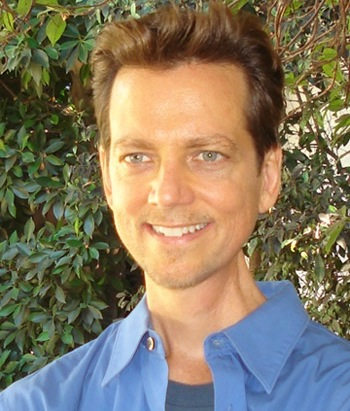
- Born: Boston, Massachusetts
- Occupation: Television producer
- Website: http://www.johnsencio.com

John Sencio is an American television producer, host and radio personality. He is also a two-time cancer survivor. He currently resides in Los Angeles according to his official website.

Sencio grew up in Holliston, Massachusetts. Prior to working in television he was a counselor for young people with emotional and behavioral disorders. He is a graduate of Emerson College, where he studied television, film, and radio.

He was a popular VJ on MTV for four years during the mid-1990s. He hosted a number of shows on MTV including Rude Awakening, which aired music videos from 6 am to 7 am. He was known for writing and producing his own skits. He interviewed a number of celebrities, from music artists such as Snoop Dogg, athletes such as Wayne Gretzky, and movie stars including Nicolas Cage, Halle Berry, John Travolta, and Jodie Foster. Sencio remained under contract to Viacom (MTV's Parent Company) until 1998.

He had a lower profile on television for a period after leaving MTV. During this time he did star in a short lived sitcom for Warner Bros. He also had hosting stints on Simplify Your Life for the Fine Living Network, 48 Hour Wedding for PAX television network, and Movie Buzz for the Fox Entertainment Group. According to IMDb, he had bit parts in motion pictures as well. It is implied on his official website that this phase was a result of focusing on personal projects ranging from independent film to music.

Sencio is a cancer survivor. According to The Cancer Survivors Network, it was during this early phase of his career that he underwent chemotherapy and radiation therapy for Hodgkin's Lymphoma. He was treated at NYU Medical Center, in New York City. On the American Cancer Society website, Sencio is described as having a “miraculous” recovery.

He returned to higher profile roles on television in the mid-2000s.

In 2004 and 2005, he was an anchor and reporter for a nationally syndicated reality show, produced by NBC, called Home Delivery. This program was a blend of daytime talk and broadcast journalism. ''People'' Magazine described Home Delivery as a show in which Sencio “fan[s] out across the country to make dreams come true and hurts go away.” Home Delivery was re-launched in 2009 on the ION Network. According to an article on Wellness.com, John Sencio began motivational speaking in Los Angeles following Home Delivery.

In 2006, he hosted and produced television specials, and guest anchored the national news program The Daily Buzz.

Sencio hosted 5 seasons of the television program Cash in the Attic that aired on Home & Garden Television (HGTV). The show is modeled on the BBC show of the same name. On the reality show, homeowners try to sell old or unused items from their home at auction. Sometimes the items sell for more than the estimate, sometimes less. According to an interview with USA Today, “Sencio crisscrossed the USA helping families raise cash.” This American version of Cash in The Attic premiered in the fall of 2005 and to date, according to IMDb, he has hosted and produced 65 episodes.

In 2012, Sencio revealed he was diagnosed with stage-4 Carcinoma, “head & neck” cancer. After months of aggressive surgery, chemotherapy, and radiation treatment, he was eventually declared “cancer free”.

According to NBC Universal's Home Delivery website, Sencio is married and has children.
