= Bigger Than Tina =

- Directed by: Neil Foley
- Written by: Neil Foley
- Produced by: Grant Hardie; Jenny Loncaris executive Daniel Scharf
- Starring: Michael Dalley; Sally Lightfoot; Anni Finsterer
- Distributed by: Palace (Australia)
- Release date: 25 November 1999
- Running time: 90 minutes
- Country: Australia
- Language: English
- Budget: $3,000
- Box office: $15,000 (Australia)

Bigger Than Tina is a 1999 Australian mockumentary film about an aspiring Melbourne singer-songwriter named Dan Vardy-Cobb as he pursues his dream of success. The film was written and directed by Neil Foley, and stars Michael Dalley in the lead role. An elaborate hoax publicity campaign in 1999 attempted to fool the general public into thinking that Vardy-Cobb was a real person.

== Plot summary ==
Dan Vardy-Cobb lives in Pakenham with his girlfriend Khrystal. He works in the family lawnmower business and dreams of success as a singer-songwriter, performing at open mic nights. Finding talent representation with Wesinta Management, he is convinced to move with Khrystal from their large Pakenham house to a small apartment in Brunswick closer to the city. As a result, Khrystal quits her job as a nurse at Dandenong Hospital and begins working as a kitchen hand in a cafe named Joe's, where her colleague Amanda appears to show an emotional and physical interest in her. Spurred on by management and opportunistic music producers who tell him his material is good, Dan spends thousands of dollars booking studio time at Active Recordings to make his first album. Dan and Khrystal then attend a Tina Arena concert, an artist he particularly admires and feels he has "a lot in common" with. On the train home, he talks about how he admires Tina sexually and considers her "the perfect woman"; meanwhile, he is increasingly neglectful of Khrystal.

The studio sessions go poorly as Dan takes an aggressively perfectionist attitude with the musicians and experienced producer Nippy Tucker. After several long days, things finally come to a head when Nippy storms out during a heated argument over the use of an echo effect on the word "orgasmic." The album is finished anyway and printed on CD. Dan then plays a daytime show at The Glen Shopping Centre in Glen Waverley but reacts aggressively when two young boys heckle him. The centre manager intervenes and a tearful, hysterical Dan further confronts him about supposedly "sabotaging" his act. A screaming match follows in the parking lot in which Dan insists that he still be paid for the gig, while also abusing Khrystal as she attempts to make peace. While driving home alone, she also gets in an unrelated car accident. The shopping centre cancels their contract with Wesinta Management as a result of the incident. Dan returns to the Wesinta offices the next day, where he is told they are dropping him as a client and that his CDs are "worthless." Dan decides to use what remains of Khrystal's money to have more CDs printed up, and also begins the expensive process of suing Wesinta.

Three days later, Khrystal finally decides to cut ties with Dan and move out with Amanda. Dan's life then begins to unravel as he mentally breaks down. He fails to make rent, lives off instant food and constantly harasses the Wesinta office with crank phone calls. He reaches rock bottom when his family find him sobbing on the living room floor, being confronted by Wes from Wesinta who is attempting to coerce him to sign a legal waiver. Ultimately, Dan moves back to Pakenham and finds work singing as background music in the bistro of an RSL Club.

== Production and release ==
Neil Foley was inspired to write Bigger Than Tina after seeing a singer-songwriter performing at a "football club Christmas lunch", and hearing about song contests at RSL clubs in which participants would "hock their lives to think they were breaking into the music industry." As he learned more about the music industry, he also realised how many "sharks" were in place to fleece money out of untalented performers. The film was shot between January and March 1998 on a budget of $3,000. All dialogue was ad-libbed, with the actors only given a rough outline of their characters beforehand. Influences included Neighbours and A Current Affair. The talent quest scene in which Dan sings "Khrystalised" was shot at an actual open mic night in Berwick. It debuted at the Melbourne Film Festival on 25 July 1998 and had a theatrical release later in the year, launching at the St. Kilda Bowling Green Club on 25 November. The theatrical gross was ultimately $15,000. A home video release followed in 2000.

== Dan Vardy-Cobb hoax ==
An elaborate hoax publicity campaign attempted to convince the public that the character of Dan Vardy-Cobb was a real person. It was decided to spin the narrative that Vardy-Cobb actually had found success after the events of the film and had changed his persona to that of a classic rock star. A Dan Vardy-Cobb "official website" was launched, street press ads appeared seeking a new manager for him and his demo CD was sent out to record companies and media outlets. Various music industry figures were left a voicemail message stating "I am the future of Australian rock, so commit my name to memory"; several of them eagerly called back. Articles about Vardy-Cobb and interviews with him were published through various print media outlets, including The Age, as if he were a real person. One referred to him as "the new King of Pop." Johnny Young of Young Talent Time was in on the hoax, personally endorsing Vardy-Cobb and performing with him. Dalley also made numerous personal appearances as Vardy-Cobb, including on the radio station 3RRR and on music TV station Channel V, during which he stormed off yelling "This isn't real television." He also attended the ARIAs and was seen publicly with various celebrities, including Hugh Grant and Elizabeth Hurley at the Australian premiere of Mickey Blue Eyes.

== Reception ==
Nick Place of The Age praised the film and compared it to Frontline, though added that he found the grainy and hand-held shots difficult to watch and wondered if it would have been better suited to a one-hour TV special. Lawrie Zion, reviewing the film's 2000 home video release also in The Age, felt that the film "went off the rails" as viewers progressively lost sympathy for Vardy-Cobb. Phillipa Hawker, again of The Age, felt the film needed a "tighter, more focused script" and compared it unfavourably to the "real thing" documentary Original Schtick.

== Soundtrack ==
Bigger Than Tina

Soundtrack album by Various Artists
- Released: November 1999
- Label: Backyard Productions

Singles from Bigger Than Tina
- 1. "Bigger Than Tina" Released: October 1999

Festival Records released a "from and inspired by" soundtrack CD for the film, further premised on the conceptual idea that Vardy-Cobb had managed to infiltrate the music industry enough to make friends with several Australian rock bands and persuade them to record covers of 1980s pop hits.

=== Track listing ===
Bigger Than Tina
No.	Title	Length
1.	"Bigger Than Tina II" (performed by The Fauves)
2.	"We Can Get Together" (performed by Custard)
3.	"Better the Devil You Know" (performed by The Meanies)
4.	"State of the Heart" (performed by Pollyana)
5.	"Bigger Than Tina I" (performed by The Fauves)
6.	"Am I Ever Gonna See Your Face Again" (performed by Mach Pelican)
7.	"We Can't Be Beaten" (performed by 28 Days)
8.	"Science Fiction" (performed by Molar)
9.	"Love Is Blindness" (performed by The Dumpmasters featuring Dan Vardy Cobb)
10.	"Sound of Your Heart" (performed by Rebecca's Empire featuring Dan Vardy Cobb)
11.	"Chrystalized (By Your Touch)" (performed by Dan Vardy Cobb and the Deeveecees)
12.	"Goodbye" (performed by Dan Vardy Cobb and the Deeveecees)
13.	"Ways of Love" (performed by Dan Vardy Cobb and the Deeveecees)
14.	"Prisoner of Love" (performed by Dan Vardy Cobb and the Deeveecees)
15.	"Send Me an Angel" (performed by Honeysmack featuring Dan Vardy Cobb)
16.	"Love Is Blindness" (performed by The Dumpmasters featuring Dan Vardy Cobb) (Extended)
