= Larry Crumpler =

American geologist and volcanologist

Larry Crumpler is an American geologist and volcanologist who serves as the Research Curator for Volcanology & Space Science at the New Mexico Museum of Natural History and Science in Albuquerque, as well as an Associate Professor at the University of New Mexico. He is a member of the Mars Exploration Rover science team. Larry's Lookout on Mars is named after him. He is recognized for his research on volcanic processes, particularly in New Mexico, and for his comparative studies of volcanism on Earth, Mars, and Venus.
