= Lonesome (2022 film) =

- Film poster
- Directed by: Craig Boreham
- Written by: Craig Boreham
- Produced by: Craig Boreham; Ben Ferris; Ulysses Oliver; Dean Francis
- Starring: Josh Lavery; Daniel Gabriel; Ian Roberts
- Cinematography: Dean Francis
- Edited by: Danielle Boesenberg
- Music by: Tony Buchen
- Production companies: Breathless Films; JJ Splice Films
- Distributed by: M-Appeal
- Release date: 21 April 2022 (SIFF)
- Running time: 95 minutes
- Country: Australia
- Language: English

Lonesome is an Australian erotic drama film, directed by Craig Boreham and released in 2022. The film centres on Casey (Josh Lavery), a young man who grew up on a farm in rural Australia but moves to Sydney when he is rejected by his father after being outed as gay.

The film's cast also includes Daniel Gabriel as Tib, a casual sexual hookup with whom Casey gradually develops a deeper emotional and romantic connection, and Ian Roberts as Pietro, an older gay man who offers Casey work as a houseboy.

The film entered production in Sydney in June 2021.

The film was acquired for distribution by M-Appeal, and previewed at the European Film Market. It premiered in April 2022 at the Seattle International Film Festival, and was screened at the Inside Out Film and Video Festival in May, before having its Australian premiere at the Sydney Film Festival in June.
