= Crumpler =

Australian bag manufacturer

- Trade name: Crumpler (Australia)
- Type: Private
- Founded: 1995
- Founder: David Roper and Stuart Crumpler
- Headquarters: Melbourne, Australia
- Area served: Australia; Singapore; Malaysia; Thailand; Taiwan
- Products: Messenger bags, photography bags, laptop bags and luggage
- Website: http://www.crumpler.com

Crumpler is an Australian bag brand and manufacturer from Melbourne, Australia, Established in 1995, Crumpler's is known for its colourful designs and quirky humorous marketing. The brand is also used by Crumpler Europe which is a completely separate company with no affiliation, designing and producing a different range.

== History ==
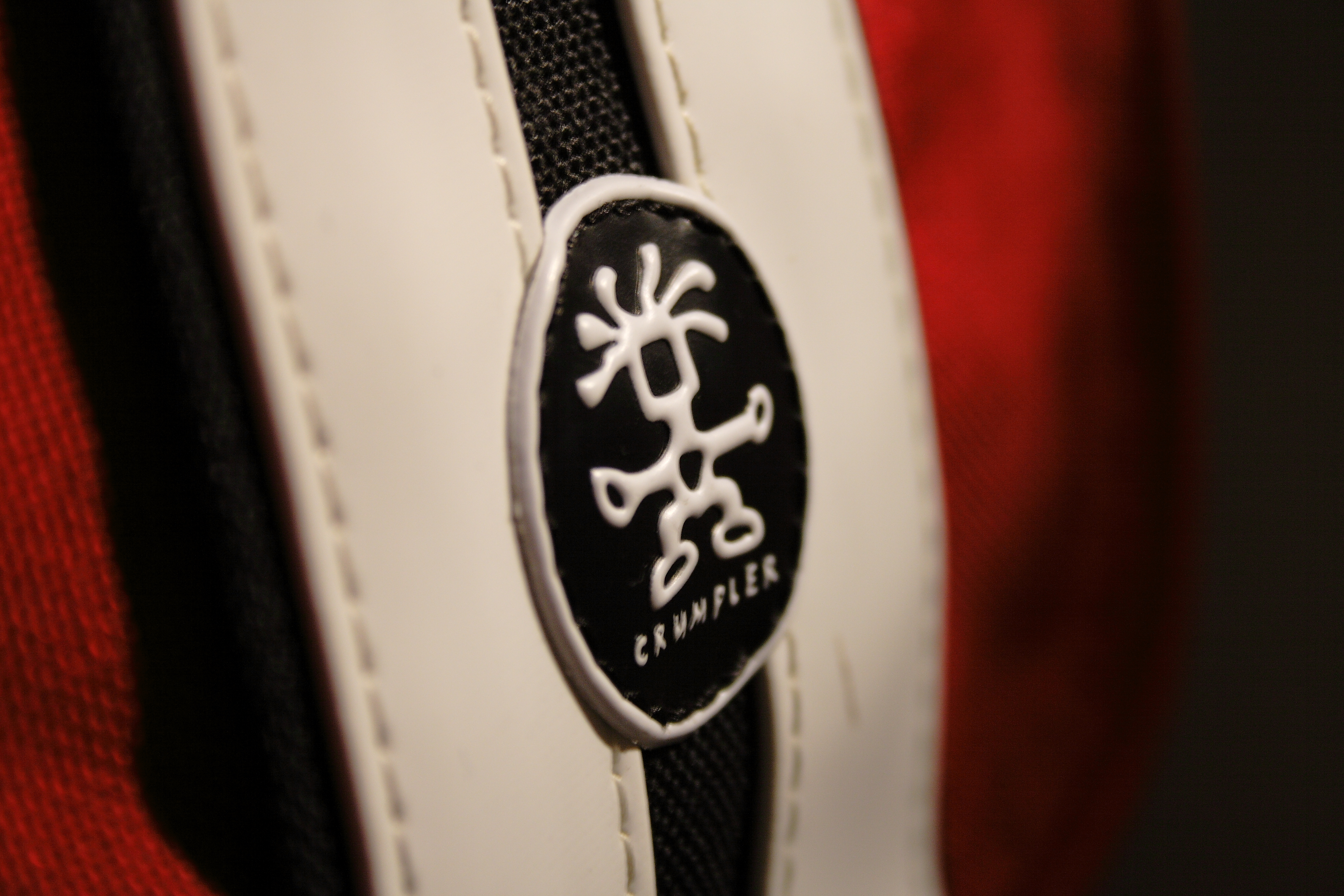
Original Crumpler logo embossed on a bag

Crumpler was founded in Melbourne in 1995 by Dave Roper (ex-bike courier and co-founder of Minuteman Messengers), and sculptor/furniture maker/bike courier Stuart Crumpler. Stuart designed the original Crumpler logo in 1991 which he branded onto his furniture designs. Will Miller who was a business partner of Dave at Minuteman came in later as a 3rd partner. From the beginning, the bags were designed for bike messengers, in particular those working for David Roper and Will Miller's bike courier company, Minuteman. The range grew to include more options in colours and sizes. The story goes Minuteman needed better bags and Dave approached Stuart who was working part-time as a bike courier and asked if he could make 20 for the fleet. The simple shoulder bags were much more practical for the job than a backpack (no need to remove completely to access the contents). After making gradual improvements to the materials and design Stuart & Dave met at The George Hotel in St Kilda and decided to start a bag company.

Stuart Crumpler sold his share of Crumpler to Roper and Miller in 2011. Roper and Miller left the company in 2015 after Crescent Capital bought a majority stake and took over management. Crumpler became the "official luggage sponsor" for the Australian Olympic team in 2015. The company did not purchase Australian swimwear brand Tigerlily out of administration in 2020 as has been wrongly reported. Crescent Capital purchased Tigerlily.

In September 2021 it was reported Crumpler had been placed into administration. By November, Roper re-acquired Crumpler in partnership with his daughter Virginia Martin. The father-daughter team beat out more than 60 expressions of interest and bids from 20 parties. The duo also announced the return of the original logo and a revisit to Crumpler's artistic roots. The Smith St, Fitzroy store reopened in December 2021, having been converted to a showroom with the addition of a workshop where designers can be seen creating limited, exclusive Fitzroy versions of classic Crumpler messenger bags.

== Brand and marketing ==
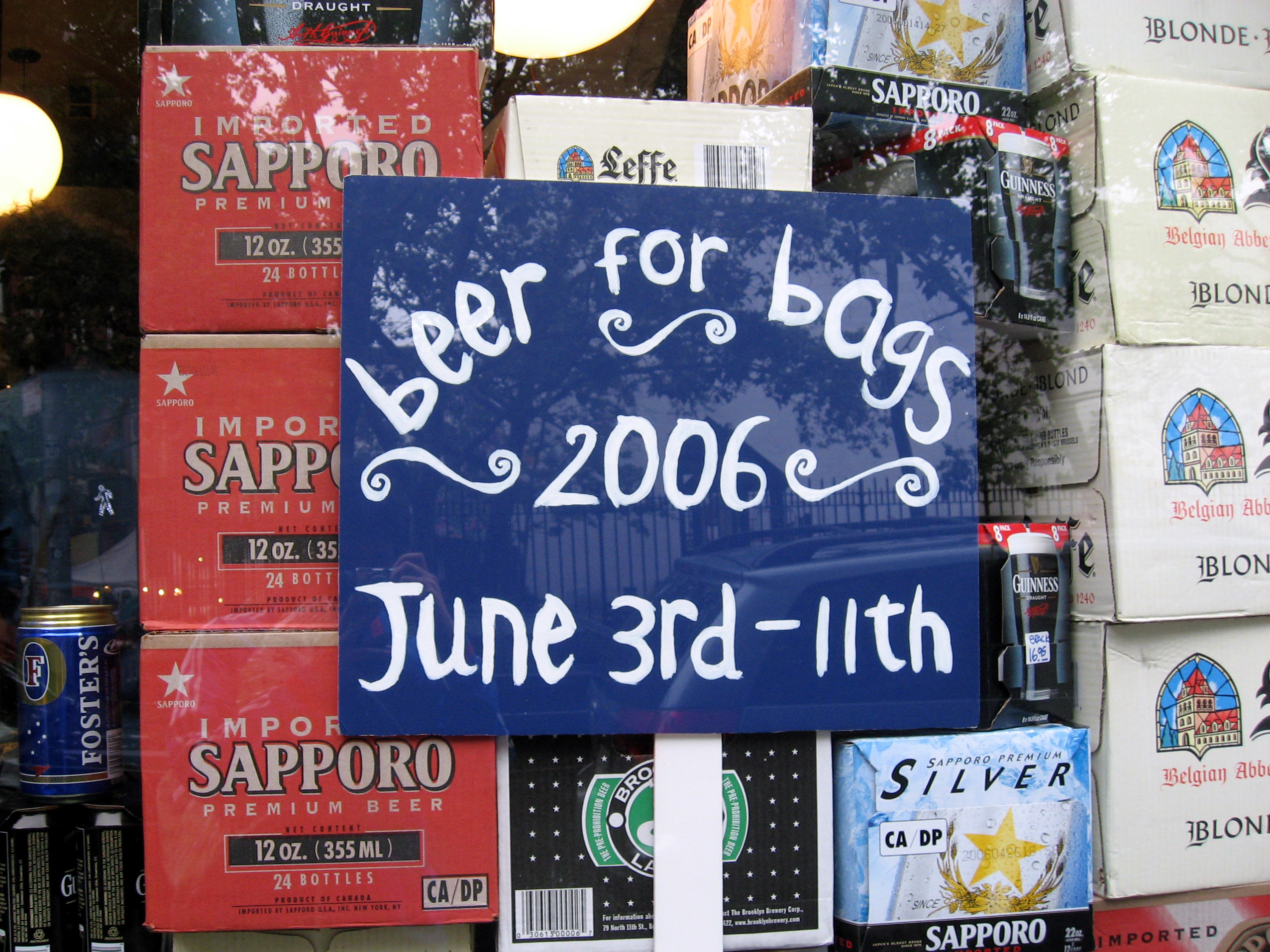
Crumpler's "Beer for Bags" campaign in 2006

In its early days, the founders drove around stencilling the Crumpler logo on public surfaces and building site hoardings, for which they were fined, but generated word-of-mouth publicity. In the late 1990s, Crumpler established Melbourne Alleycat races, consisting of illegal street races for cycle messengers. They then also sponsored similar races in other Australian cities. This led to them sponsoring the annual Australian Cycle Messenger Championships.

Its original logo consisted of a stick figure with dreadlocks, designed before the company was founded. In 2018, the private equity brand owners and then CEO launched an all-new logo following results of a focus group. This was met with significant backlash and the generic looking stick figure has since become known as Toilet Man due to its similarity to a toilet door sign. The original logo was reinstated in 2022.

In 2006, a "Beer for Bags" event was held where beer was the only currency accepted in store. Crumpler also placed their logo on millions of fruit stickers and matchboxes, and once used a nude model to demonstrate the sizes of its bags. Bags are given unusual names such as "Barney Rustle," "Complete Seed," and "Moderate Embarrassment."

This approach also spread to the company's web site after a redesign, which was considered to be cryptic and difficult to navigate. Vincent Flanders' Web Pages that Suck listed the original website as the second-worst web site of 2006. The brand is popular in Singapore.

== Stores ==
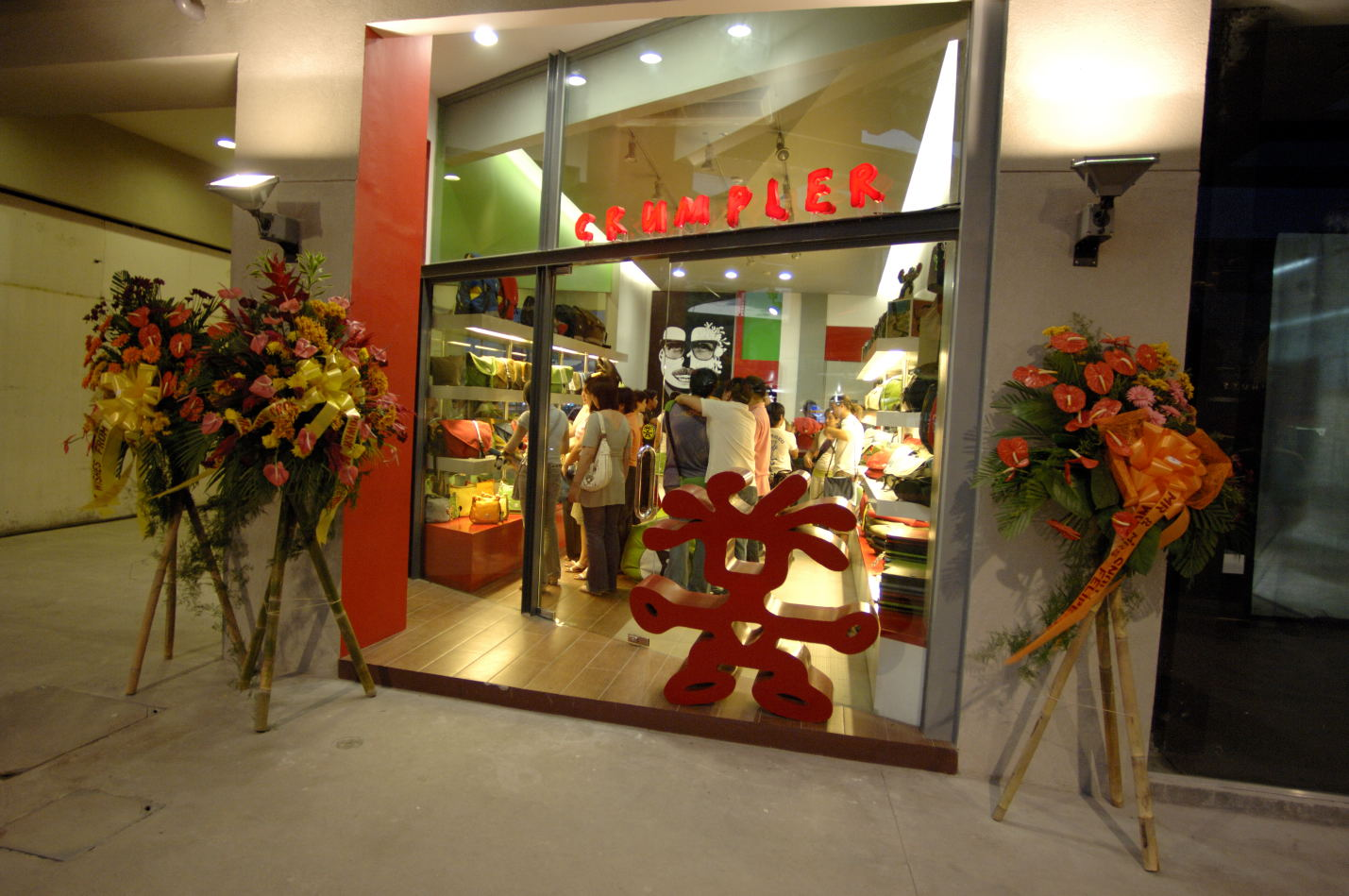
Crumpler store at Bonifacio High Street in Taguig in 2007

In Australia, Crumpler sells exclusively through their own stores. There are currently also stores in Singapore and Malaysia as well as pop-up stores in Japan, Taiwan and Thailand. It also formerly operated in the Philippines until the closure of its stores in 2014.

The brand has also had various pop-up stores worldwide. In 2015 one of these opened in the 1st arrondissement of Paris at the petite Cremerie de Paris. and in 2018 at the Australian Open tennis Grand Slam event.

== Gallery ==
Original Crumpler logo

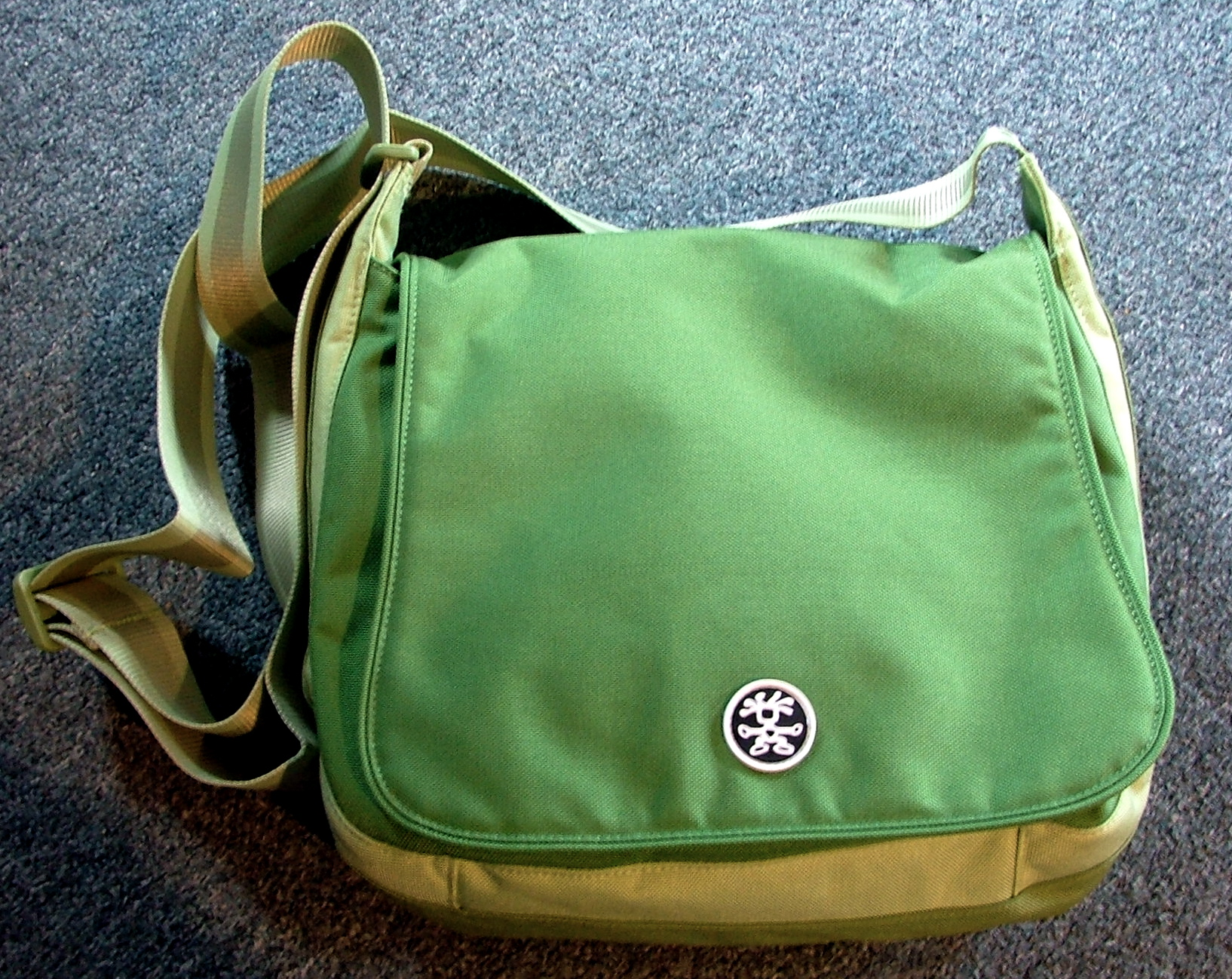
Crumpler The Maurice bag

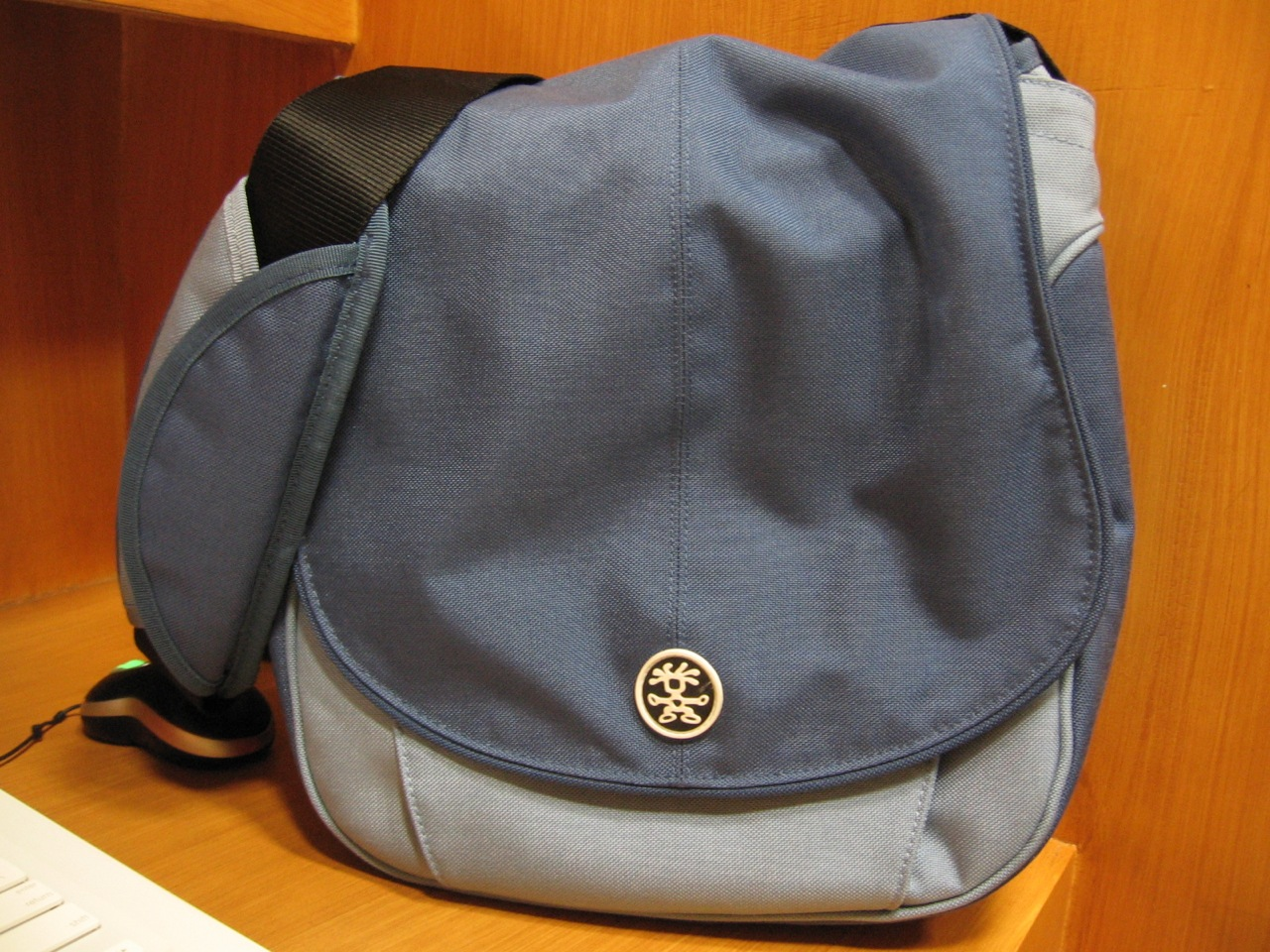
Crumpler Breakfast Buffet bag

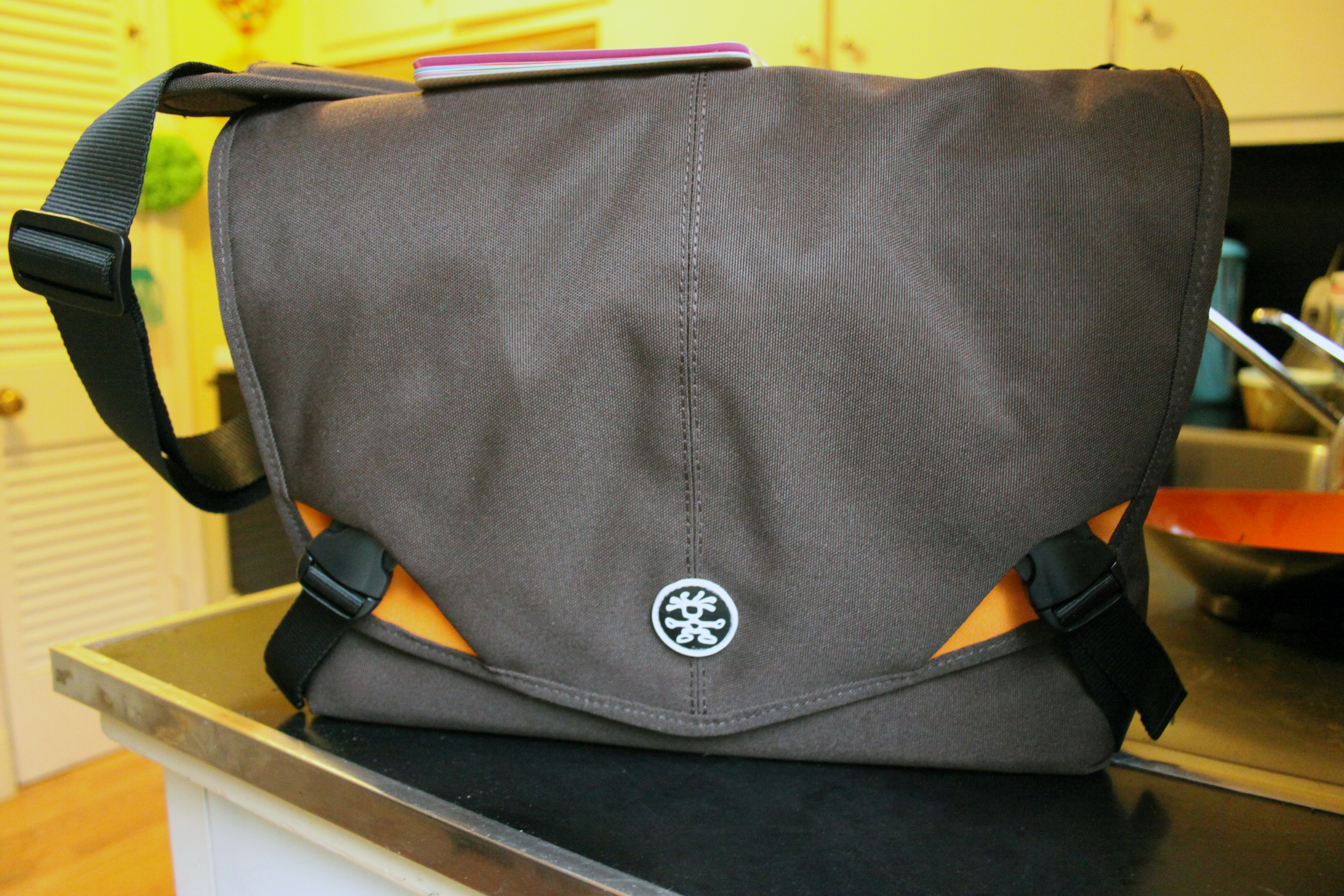
Crumpler 7 Million Dollar Home bag

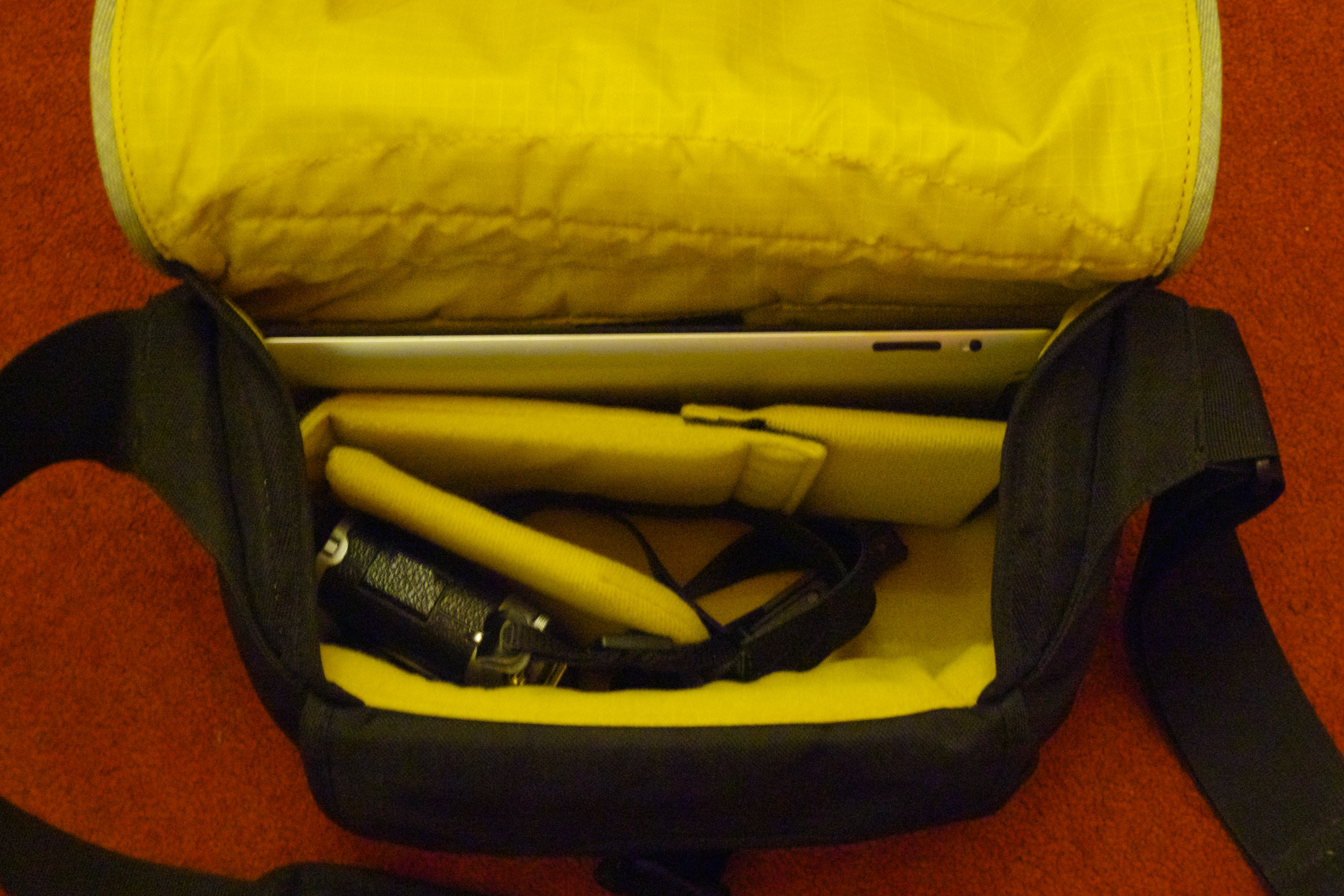
Crumpler Muffin Top bag
