= Australian Aboriginal culture =

Australian Aboriginal culture includes a number of practices and ceremonies centred on a belief in the Dreamtime and other mythology. Reverence and respect for the land and oral traditions are emphasised. The words "law" and "lore", the latter relating to the customs and stories passed down through the generations, are commonly used interchangeably. Learned from childhood, lore dictates the rules on how to interact with the land, kinship and community.

Over 300 languages, as well as sign languages, and other groupings have developed a wide range of individual cultures. Aboriginal art has existed for thousands of years and ranges from ancient rock art to modern watercolour landscapes. Traditional Aboriginal music developed a number of unique instruments, and contemporary Aboriginal music spans many genres. Aboriginal peoples did not develop a system of writing before colonisation.

== Oral tradition ==
Cultural traditions and beliefs as well as historical tellings of actual events are passed down in Aboriginal oral tradition, also known loosely as oral history (although the latter has a more specific definition). Some of the stories are many thousands of years old. In a study published in February 2020, new evidence produced using radiometric dating showed that both Budj Bim and Tower Hill volcanoes erupted at least 34,000 years ago. Significantly, this is a "minimum age constraint for human presence in Victoria", and also could be interpreted as evidence for the Gunditjmara oral histories which tell of volcanic eruptions being some of the oldest oral traditions in existence. An axe found underneath volcanic ash in 1947 was also proof that humans inhabited the region before the eruption of Tower Hill.

== Art and crafts ==
Australian Aboriginal art has a history spanning thousands of years. Aboriginal artists continue these traditions using both modern and traditional materials in their artworks. Aboriginal art is the most internationally recognizable form of Australian art. Several styles of Aboriginal art have developed in modern times including the watercolour paintings of Albert Namatjira, the Hermannsburg School, and the acrylic Papunya Tula "dot art" movement. Painting is a large source of income for some Central Australian communities such as at Yuendumu.

Basket weaving has been traditionally practised by the women of many Aboriginal peoples across the continent for centuries.

== Astronomy ==
A depiction of the Emu in the sky, which is an Australian Aboriginal constellation consisting of dark clouds rather than stars. The time of year in which the Emu in the sky stands upright in the evening marks the time when emu eggs are ready to be collected.

For many Aboriginal cultures, the night sky is a repository of stories and law. Songlines can be traced through the sky and the land. Stories and songs associated with the sky under many cultural tents.

== Beliefs ==
Aboriginal Australians' oral tradition and spiritual values build on reverence for the land and on a belief in the Dreamtime, or Dreaming. The Dreaming is considered to be both the ancient time of creation and the present-day reality of Dreaming. It describes the Aboriginal cosmology, and includes the ancestral stories about the supernatural creator-beings and how they created places. Each story can be called a "Dreaming", with the whole continent criss-crossed by Dreamings or ancestral tracks, also represented by songlines.

There are many different groups, each with their own individual culture, belief structure and language.

- The Rainbow Serpent is a major ancestral being for many Aboriginal people across Australia.
- Baiame or Bunjil are regarded as the primary creator-spirits in South-East Australia.
- Dingo Dreaming is a significant ancestor in the interior regions of Bandiyan, as Dingo formed the songlines that cross the continent from north to south and east to west.
- The Yowie and Bunyip have their roots in Aboriginal mythology.

=== Sacred sites ===
To Aboriginal people, some places are sacred, owing to their central place in the mythology of the local people.

== Customary law ==
The words "law" and "lore" are commonly used interchangeably: "law" was introduced by the British, whereas "lore" relates to the customs and stories from the Dreamtime, which has been passed on through countless generations through songlines, stories and dance. Learned from childhood, lore dictates the rules on how to interact with the land, kinship and community.

=== Kurdaitcha ===
Kurdaitcha (or kurdaitcha man, and also spelled kurdaitcha, gadaidja, cadiche, kadaitcha, or karadji) is a type of shaman amongst the Arrernte people, an Aboriginal group in Central Australia. The kurdaitcha may be brought in to punish a guilty party by death. The word may also relate to the ritual in which the death is willed by the kurdaitcha man, known also as bone-pointing.

The expectation that death would result from having a bone pointed at a victim is not without foundation. Other similar rituals that cause death have been recorded around the world. Victims become listless and apathetic, usually refusing food or water with death often occurring within days of being "cursed". When victims survive, it is assumed that the ritual was faulty in its execution. The phenomenon is recognized as psychosomatic in that death is caused by an emotional response—often fear—to some suggested outside force and is known as "voodoo death". As this term refers to a specific religion, the medical establishment has suggested that "self-willed death", or "bone-pointing syndrome" is more appropriate. In Australia, the practice is still common enough that hospitals and nursing staff are trained to manage illness caused by "bad spirits" and bone pointing.

=== Arnhem Land ===
The complete system of Yolngu customary law is the "Madayin", which embodies the rights and responsibilities of the owners of the law, or citizens (rom watangu walal, or simply rom). Madayin includes the rom, as well as the objects that symbolise the law, oral rules, names and song cycles, and the sacred places that are used to maintain, develop and provide education in the law. Rom can be roughly translated as "law" or "culture", but it embodies more than either of these words. Galarrwuy Yunupingu has described Rom watangu as the overarching law of the land, which is "lasting and alive... my backbone".

It covers ownership of land and waters and the resources within this region; it controls production trade; and includes social, religious and ethical laws. These include laws for conservation and farming of flora and fauna. Observance of Madayin creates a state of balance, peace and true justice, known as Magaya.

Rom includes bush crafts such as basket-weaving and mat-making, and stories which teach history, hunting, spear-making, gathering food, building shelters and rafts, various rituals, and taking care of others.

"Rom" is a word and concept shared by at least one of the nearby peoples, the Anbarra, who also perform a Rom ceremony.

== Ceremonies and sacred objects ==
Aboriginal ceremonies have been a part of Aboriginal culture since the beginning, and still play a vital part in society. They are held often, for many different reasons, all of which are based on the spiritual beliefs and cultural practices of the community. They include Dreaming stories, secret events at sacred sites, homecomings, births and deaths. They still play a very important part in the lives and culture of Aboriginal people. They are performed in Arnhem Land and Central Australia with the aim of ensuring a plentiful supply of foods; in many regions they play an important part in educating children, passing on the lore of their people, spiritual beliefs and survival skills; some ceremonies are a rite of passage for adolescents; other ceremonies are around marriage, death or burial. Most include dance, song, rituals and elaborate body decoration and/or costume. Ancient Aboriginal rock art shows ceremonies and traditions that are still continued today.

Ceremonies provide a time and place for everyone in the group and community to work together to ensure the ongoing survival of spiritual and cultural beliefs. Certain stories are individually "owned" by a group, and in some cases dances, body decoration and symbols in a ceremony pass on these stories only within the group, so it is vital that these ceremonies are remembered and performed correctly. Men and women have different roles, and are sometimes appointed as guardians of a sacred site, whose role it is to care for the site and the spiritual beings who live there, achieved partly by performing ceremonies. The terms "men’s business" and "women’s business" are sometimes used; neither have greater spiritual needs or responsibilities than the other, but jointly ensure that sacred practices are passed on. Men often conduct ceremonies, but women are also guardians of special knowledge, hold great spiritual power within a group, and conduct ceremonies. Participation in ceremonies can also be restricted by age, family group, language group, but are sometimes open to all, depending on the purpose of the ceremony.

Right of access to songs and dances pertaining to a specific ceremony belong to a certain defined group (known as manikay by the Yolngu peoples of north-east Arnhem Land, or clan songs); some may be shared with people outside the community, but some are never shared. There is a wide range of songs, dances, music, body ornamentation, costume, and symbolism, designed to connect the body with the spiritual world of the ancestors. Ceremonies help to sustain Aboriginal identity as well as the group's connection to country and family.

=== Examples of ceremonies ===
- A bora is an initiation ceremony in which young boys (Kippas) become men.
- Bunggul is a traditional ceremonial dance of the Yolngu people of East Arnhem Land.
- The bunya feast held in the hinterland of the Sunshine Coast of Queensland is well-known. Representatives from many different groups from across southern Queensland and northern New South Wales would meet to discuss important issues relating to the environment, social relationships, politics and Dreaming lore, feasting and sharing dance ceremonies. Many conflicts would be settled at this event, and consequences for breaches of laws were discussed.
- Burial practices differ from group to group. In parts of Northern Australia, there are two stages of burial. After the body has been on an elevated platform, covered with leaves and branches, long enough for the flesh to rot away from the bones, the bones are collected, painted with ochre, and dispersed in various ways.
- A corroboree is a ceremonial meeting for Australian Aboriginal people, interacting with the Dreaming and accompanied by song and dance. They differ from group to group, and may be sacred and private.
- An ilma is both a public ceremony or performance of the Bardi people, and the hand-held objects used in these ceremonies.
- The inma is a cultural ceremony of Aṉangu women of Central Australia, involving song and dance and embodying the stories and designs of the tjukurrpa (Ancestral Law, or Dreamtime). The ceremony carries camaraderie, joy, playfulness and seriousness, and may last for hours. There are many different inma, all profoundly significant to the culture.
- The Mamurrng is a ceremony of West Arnhem Land in which two different language communities come together for trade and diplomacy.
- The Morning Star Ceremony is a mortuary ceremony of the Dhuwa moiety.
- The ngarra is one of the major regional rituals performed in north-east Arnhem Land, begun by the Rirratjingu clan of the Yolŋu people of East Arnhem. The first ngarra was performed by creation ancestors called Djang'kawu at the sacred site of Balma, in Yalangbara, after giving birth to the first of the Rirratjingu clan.
- A Pukamani, or Pukumani, is a burial ceremony of the Tiwi Islands, which lasts for several days around the grave of the deceased about six months after their death. Elaborate funerary posts known as tutini are erected around the grave before the ceremony, and dancers dance and sing around the posts.
- The ROM (or Rom - see previous section) ceremony, involving songs, dances, and artefacts, which involve presenting other neighbouring communities with decorated totem poles, with the intent of establishing or re-establishing friendly terms with them; a form of diplomacy. The process of making and decorating the poles can extend over weeks, and involves successive sessions of song and dance, culminating in the ceremony where gifts are exchanged. In April 2017, a four-day festival to mark the Rom ceremony was attended by about 500 people at Gapuwiyak School, in north-eastern Arnhem Land. It was planned to hold the event each term. Historian and writer Billy Griffiths wrote in his award-winning book Deep Time Dreaming: Uncovering Ancient Australia (2018), of the Rom ceremony as an "extension of friendship" and "ritual of diplomacy", of which the "full significance ... has yet to be appreciated by the Australian public. At the heart of this symbolic act is a gift – of song and dance and cultural knowledge, but it comes with obligations. The acceptance of such a gift enmeshes the recipients into a continual process of reciprocity".
- A smoking ceremony is a cleansing ritual performed on special occasions.
- Tjurunga (or churinga) are objects of religious significance by Central Australian Arrernte groups.
- Walkabout is a rite of passage journey during adolescence, often mis-applied.
- A welcome to country is a ritual now performed at many events held in Australia, intended to highlight the cultural significance of the surrounding area to a particular Aboriginal group. The welcome must be performed by a recognised elder of the group. The welcome ceremony is sometimes accompanied by a smoking ceremony, music or dance.

=== Musical instruments and other objects ===
The didgeridoo originated in northern Australia, but is now used throughout the continent. Clapsticks, seed rattles and objects such as rocks or pieces of wood are used; in a few areas, women play a drum made from goanna, snake, kangaroo or emu skin.

== Cuisine ==
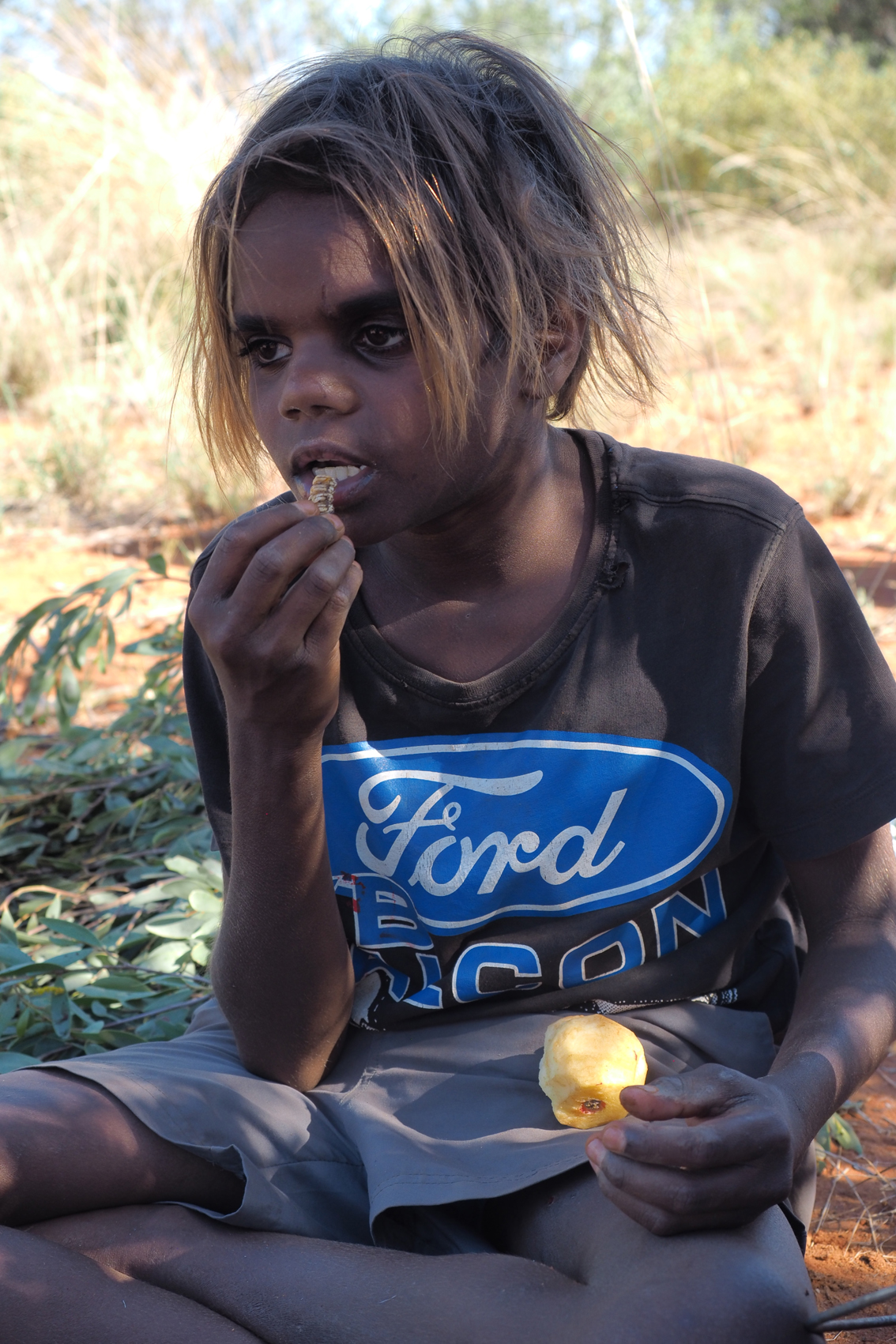
Aboriginal boy eating witchetty grub: Yuendumu, 2017

Animal native foods include kangaroo, emu, witchetty grubs and crocodile. Plant foods include fruits such as quandong, kutjera, spices such as lemon myrtle and vegetables such as warrigal greens, bananas and various native yams. Since the 1970s, there has been recognition of the nutritional and gourmet value of native foods by non-Indigenous Australians, and the bushfood industry has grown enormously.

== Medicine ==
Pituri is a mixture of leaves and wood ash traditionally chewed as a stimulant (or, after extended use, a depressant) by Aboriginal Australians widely across the continent. Leaves are gathered from any of several species of native tobacco (Nicotiana) or from at least one distinct population of the species Duboisia hopwoodii. Various species of Acacia, Grevillea and Eucalyptus are burned to produce the ash. Traditional healers (known as Ngangkari in the Western jester areas of Central Australia) are highly respected men and women who not only acted as healers or doctors, but also generally served as custodians of important Dreaming stories.

== Fire practices ==
Cultural burning, identified by Australian archaeologist Rhys Jones in 1969, is the practice of regularly and systematically burning patches of vegetation used in Central to Northern Australia to facilitate hunting, to reduce the frequency of major bush-fires, and to change the composition of plant and animal species in an area. This "fire-stick farming", or "burning off", reduces the fuel-load for a potential major bush fire, while fertilising the ground and increasing the number of young plants, providing additional food for kangaroos and other fauna hunted for meat. It is regarded as good husbandry and "looking after the land" by Aboriginal people of the Northern Territory.

== Language ==
The Australian Aboriginal languages consist of around 290–363 languages belonging to an estimated 28 language families and isolates, spoken by Aboriginal Australians of mainland Australia and a few nearby islands. The relationships between these languages are not clear at present. Many Australian Aboriginal cultures have or traditionally had a manually coded language, a signed counterpart of their oral language. This appears to be connected with various speech taboos between certain kin or at particular times, such as during a mourning period for women or during initiation ceremonies for men.

Avoidance speech in Australian Aboriginal languages is closely tied to elaborate tribal kinship systems in which certain relatives are considered taboo. Avoidance relations differ from tribe to tribe in terms of strictness and to whom they apply. Typically, there is an avoidance relationship between a man and his mother-in-law, usually between a woman and her father-in-law, and sometimes between any person and their same-sex parent-in-law. For some tribes, avoidance relationships are extended to other family members, such as the mother-in-law's brother in Warlpiri or cross-cousins in Dyirbal. All relations are classificatory – more people may fall into the "mother-in-law" category than just a man's wife's mother.

Australian Aboriginal English (AAE) is a dialect of Australian English used by a large section of the Indigenous Australian (Aboriginal Australian and Torres Strait Islander) population. Australian Kriol is an English-based creole language that developed from a pidgin used in the early days of European colonisation. The pidgin died out in most parts of the country, except in the Northern Territory, which has maintained a vibrant use of the language, spoken by about 30,000 people. It is distinct from Torres Strait Creole.

== Literature ==
At the point of the first colonisation, Indigenous Australians had not developed a system of writing, so the first literary accounts of Aboriginal people come from the journals of early European explorers, which contain descriptions of first contact.

A letter to Governor Arthur Phillip written by Bennelong in 1796 is the first known work written in English by an Aboriginal person.

While his father, James Unaipon (c. 1835–1907), contributed to accounts of Ngarrindjeri mythology written by the missionary George Taplin in South Australia, David Unaipon (1872–1967) provided the first accounts of Aboriginal mythology written by an Aboriginal person, Legendary Tales of the Australian Aborigines (1924–25), and was the first Aboriginal author to be published.

The Yirrkala bark petitions of 1963 are the first traditional Aboriginal document recognised by the Australian Parliament.

Oodgeroo Noonuccal (1920–1993) was a famous Aboriginal poet, writer and rights activist credited with publishing the first Aboriginal book of verse: We Are Going (1964).

Sally Morgan's 1987 memoir My Place brought Indigenous stories to wider notice.

Leading Aboriginal activists Marcia Langton (First Australians documentary TV series, 2008) and Noel Pearson (Up from the Mission, 2009) are contemporary contributors to Australian non-fiction. Other voices of Indigenous Australians include the playwright Jack Davis and Kevin Gilbert.

Writers coming to prominence in the 21st century include Kim Scott, Alexis Wright, Kate Howarth, Tara June Winch, Yvette Holt and Anita Heiss. Indigenous authors who have won Australia's Miles Franklin Award include Kim Scott, who was joint winner (with Thea Astley) in 2000 for Benang and again in 2011 for That Deadman Dance. Alexis Wright won the award in 2007 for her novel Carpentaria. Melissa Lucashenko won the Miles Franklin Award in 2019 for her novel Too Much Lip.

== Music ==
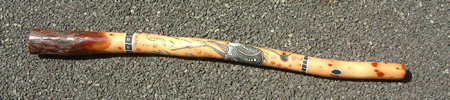
A didgeridoo, or yidaki

Aboriginal people have developed unique musical instruments and folk styles. The didgeridoo is often considered the national instrument of Aboriginal Australians; however, it was traditionally played by peoples of Northern Australia, and only by the men. It has possibly been used by the people of the Kakadu region for 1500 years.

Clapping sticks are probably the more ubiquitous musical instrument, especially because they help maintain rhythm. More recently, Aboriginal musicians have branched into rock and roll, hip hop and reggae. Bands such as No Fixed Address and Yothu Yindi were two of the earliest Aboriginal bands to gain a popular following among Australians of all cultures.

In 1997 the State and Federal Governments set up the Aboriginal Centre for the Performing Arts (ACPA) to preserve and nurture Aboriginal music and talent across all styles and genres from traditional to contemporary.

== Sport and games ==
Woggabaliri is a traditional Indigenous Australian "co-operative kicking volley game". The Indigenous in areas of and near New South Wales played a ball game called Woggabaliri. The ball was usually made of possum fur, and was played in a group of four to six players in circle. It was a co-operative kicking game to see for how long the ball can be kept in the air before it touches the ground.

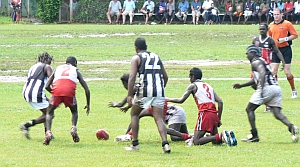
An Indigenous community Australian rules football game

The Djab Wurrung and Jardwadjali people of western Victoria once participated in the traditional game of Marn Grook, a type of football played with possum hide. The game is believed by some commentators, including Martin Flanagan, Jim Poulter and Col Hutchinson, to have inspired Tom Wills, inventor of the code of Australian rules football.

Similarity between Marn Grook and Australian football include jumping to catch the ball or high "marking", which results in a free kick. Use of the word "mark" in the game may be influenced by the Marn Grook word mumarki, meaning "catch". However, this is likely a false etymology; the term "mark" is traditionally used in Rugby and other games that predate AFL to describe a free kick resulting from a catch, in reference to the player making a mark on the ground from which to take a free kick, rather than continuing to play on.

There are many Indigenous AFL players at professional level, with approximately one in ten players being of Indigenous origin as of 2007. The contribution of the Aboriginal people to the game is recognized by the annual AFL "Dreamtime at the 'G" match at the Melbourne Cricket Ground between Essendon and Richmond football clubs (the colors of the two clubs combine to form the colours of the Aboriginal flag).

Testifying to this abundance of Indigenous talent, the Aboriginal All-Stars, an AFL-level all-Aboriginal football side competes against any one of the Australian Football League's current football teams in pre-season tests. The Clontarf Foundation and football academy is just one organisation aimed at further developing aboriginal football talent. The Tiwi Bombers began playing in the Northern Territory Football League and became the first all-Aboriginal side to compete in a major Australian competition.

Coreeda is a style of folk wrestling practiced in Australia and is based on Aboriginal combat sports that existed in the pre-colonial period before the 19th century. Combining the movements of the traditional kangaroo dance as a warm up ritual, with a style of wrestling that utilizes a yellow 4.5 meter diameter circle that has black and red borders (similar to the Aboriginal flag), Coreeda is often compared to sports as diverse as capoeira and sumo.

A popular children's game in some parts of Australia is weet weet, or throwing the play stick. The winner throws the weet weet furthest or the most accurately.

== See also ==
- Australian Aboriginal artefacts
- Black Theatre (Sydney)
- Contemporary Indigenous Australian art
- Country (Indigenous Australians)
- Garma Festival of Traditional Cultures
- Indigenous Australian art
- Indigenous Australian literature
- Indigenous Australian traditional custodianship
- Jindyworobak Movement, a white Australian literary movement inspired by Aboriginal culture
- Living Archive of Aboriginal Languages, a digital archive of literature in endangered languages of the Northern Territory
- Lizard Island#Mangrove Beach, a 2024 pottery finding
- Stone tool#Aboriginal Australian use
- Yaama Ngunna Baaka, 2019 festival consisting of a series of corroborees

== Bibliography ==
- Bowern, Claire (23 December 2011). "How many languages were spoken in Australia?". Anggarrgoon. Archived from the original on 3 February 2019.
- Bowern, Claire; Atkinson, Quentin (2012). "Computational Phylogenetics and the Internal Structure of Pama-Nyungan". Language. 84 (4): 817–845. doi:10.1353/lan.2012.0081. S2CID 4375648.
- Dixon, R. M. W. (1980). The Languages of Australia. Cambridge University Press. ISBN 978-0-521-29450-8. Archived from the original on 22 December 2019.
