= Lynette Narkle =

Indigenous theatre actor and director

- Born: 1946 (age 79–80); Wagin, Western Australia
- Occupations: actor and director

Lynette Narkle (born 1946) is an Indigenous Australian theatre and film actor and director.

== Education ==
Narkle studied Theatre and Drama from 2002 at Murdoch University in Perth.

== Career ==
Narkle started in theatre in 1979, with Indigenous playwright Jack Davis. Narkle worked for Screenwest increasing the engagement of Indigenous filmmakers with screen culture and was an associate director at Yirra Yaakin Theatre Company from 2002 to 2006. Narkle was on the Board of the Australia Council for the Arts Aboriginal and Torres Strait Islander Arts Board from 2008 to 2010. Narkle was on the Board of the Yirra Yaakin Aboriginal Corporation from 2003 to 2007 and a WA representative on the Australia Council for the Arts Community Cultural Development Fund from 1996 to 1999.

== Personal ==
Narkle, a Noongar woman, was born in Wagin, Western Australia in 1946. Narkle has three sons and two daughters.

== Honours and awards ==
- 2017 Red Ochre Award, Australia Council for the Arts
- 2018 Honorary Doctor of Arts, Edith Cowan University

== Theatre ==
| Title | Year | Role |
|---|---|---|
| Steel and the Stone | 1972 | Aboriginal Woman |
| Kullark | 1979 | Rosie Yorla |
| The Dreamers | 1980, 1983, 1987 | Dolly Wallitch |
| No Sugar | 1985, 1990 | Millie Milimura |
| Honey Spot | 1985, 1986, 1988,2010,2012 | Mrs Winnalie |
| Salt, Mustard, Vinegar, Pepper | 1986 | Aboriginal Woman |
| State of Shock | 1987, 1990 | Alwin & Jenny Bob |
| Barungin | 1988 | Dolly Wallitch snr |
| Moorli & the Leprechaun | 1989 | Mother |
| In Our Town | 1990 | Mother |
| The Silent Years | 1990 | Associate director |
| An Aborigine Antigone | 1994 | Director and Woman |
| The Bird | 1995 | Mother |
| The Wayarning | 1995 | Director |
| Ooh La Nah Nyungah | 1996 | Director |
| Donkalonk | 1996 | Director |
| Runamuk | 1997 | Associate director |
| Headspace | 1997 | Director |
| Cruel Wild Woman | 1999 | |
| Aliwa! | 2000 | Director |
| One Day in '67 | 2003 | stockman's wife |

== Filmography ==
| Title | Year | Role |
|---|---|---|
| Jackaroo (TV series) | 1990 | Dulcie |
| Heartland (TV series) | 1994 | Rachel |
| Natural Justice: Heat (TV series) | 1996 | Alice |
| Bobtales (TV series) | 1998 | storyteller |
| Southern Cross (TV drama) | 2004 | Auntie Mary |
| Mad Bastards (Film drama) | 2010 | TJ's Mum |
| The Sapphires (Film) | 2012 | Nanny Theresa |
| Ace of Spades (Short) | 2012 | Nanna |
| The Darkside (Film) | 2013 | |
| Maap Mordak (Short) | 2015 | Nana |
| KGB (TV series) | 2019 | Aunty Doris |
| The Heights (TV series) | 2019-2020 | Aunty Pam |
