= Fringe dwellers =

People camping on the outskirts of towns

The term fringe dwellers has been used in Australia to describe groups of Aboriginal Australians who camp on the outskirts of towns and cities, from which they have become excluded, generally through law or land alienation as a result of colonisation. In Adelaide, South Australia, the term was applied particularly in the early days of settlement to those who camped in the Adelaide park lands around the city centre.

Fringe dwellers are also referred to as "Long Grassers" in contemporary times, especially in Northern Australia where year-long warm weather conditions allow itinerant Aborigines to live indefinitely on the outskirts of towns without official places of residence.

The term was used for the 1961 novel The Fringe Dwellers by Western Australian author Nene Gare. That book was adapted as the 1986 Australian film The Fringe Dwellers, directed by Bruce Beresford.

== See also ==
- Alienation (property law)
- The Fringe Dwellers, a 1986 film
- The Fringe Dwellers (novel), a 1961 novel
