= Sidney Myer Performing Arts Awards =

Australian performing arts award

The Sidney Myer Performing Arts Awards are a former Australian set of awards to recognise individuals and groups in the performing arts. Launched in 1984, the final award was given in 2023.

== History ==
The Sidney Myer Performing Arts Awards were created in 1984 by the trustees of the Sidney Myer Fund to mark the 50th anniversary of the death of Sidney Myer and ran for 40 years up to and including 2023. The awards were created to commemorate Sidney Myer's life and his love for the arts. They were intended primarily to recognise and reward outstanding achievements in dance, drama, comedy, music, opera, circus, and puppetry.

== Description ==
In their final iteration, there was one Individual Award (A$60,000), one Group Award (A$90,000) and one Facilitator's Prize (A$25,000).

The Sidney Myer Performing Arts Awards were announced and presented early each year for the preceding year. The awards were decided on a national basis and each nomination was considered by a judging committee. While past achievement was recognised, consideration was also given to the potential of an individual or group to continue their contribution to Australian society through the performing arts into the future.

== Winners ==
Year	Individual Award	Group Award	Facilitator's Prize	Ref
2023	Jane Harrison	Lucy Guerin Inc	Collette Brennan	
2022	Eryn Jean Norvill	Marrugeku	Deirdre O'Brien	
2021 (Note: In 2020 and 2021, as a result of the damage to the arts sector brought about by the COVID-19 pandemic in Australia, the number of recipients was expanded to eight.)	Clare Watson, James Berlyn, Jenny M Thomas	All the Queens Men, Blakdance, Speak Percussion	Australian Digital Concert Hall, Erin Milne	
2020	Kylie Bracknell [Kaarljilba Kaardn], Sally Chance, Robin Fox	Metro Arts, Second Echo Ensemble, The Street Theatre	Andrew Ford, Sean Pardy	
2019	Barrie Kosky	Ensemble Offspring	Richard Watts	
2018	Genevieve Lacey	Bleach* Festival	Annette Downs	
2017	Kate Mulvany	Dancenorth	Nicole Beyer	
2016	Gavin Webber	Australian Theatre for Young People	Kathy Burns	
2015	Ursula Yovich	MOFO and DARK MOFO	Daniel Clarke	
2014	Lally Katz	The Australian Brandenburg Orchestra	Helen Marcou and Quincy McLean	
2013	Daniel Keene and Elena Kats-Chernin	CIRCA	jointly awarded to Jill Morgan AM and Mohindar Dhillon	
2012	Iain Grandage	Ilbijerri Theatre Company	Philip Rolfe	
2011	Eddie Perfect	Windmill Theatre	Skinnyfish Music	
2010	Paul Capsis	Australian Art Orchestra	John Paxinos	
2009	Julie Forsyth	The Black Arm Band	Jointly awarded to Mandawuy Yunupingu and Footscray Community Arts	
2008	Archie Roach and Ruby Hunter	Big hART	Paul Petran	
2007	Ros Warby	Jointly awarded to The Song Company and Tasdance	Ian Scobie	
2006	Nigel Jamieson	TaikOz	Bill Hauritz	
2005	Benedict Andrews	Back to Back Theatre	David Bates	
2004	Rod Quantock	jointly awarded to: Melbourne Workers Theatre and Tracks Dance Theatre	Lee-Ann Buckskin	
2003	Stephen Page and Indigenous Individual winner Kylie Belling	Acrobat	Sarah Miller and Indigenous Facilitator's Prize Lafe Charlton	
2002	Lisa Gasteen and Indigenous Individual Winner Aaron Pedersen	Urban Theatre Projects	Mary Vallentine and Indigenous Facilitator's Prize - jointly awarded to Lynette Narkle, Paul McPhail and David Milroy	
2001	Paul Grabowsky and Indigenous Individual Winner David Page	Northern Rivers Performing Arts Inc	Ian Roberts (producer) and Indigenous Facilitator's Prize Richard Frankland	
2000	Lucy Guerin	Leigh Warren & Dancers	Jill Smith	
1999	David Pledger	Strange Fruit	Liz Jones	
1998	Nick Enright	Australian Chamber Orchestra	Stephen McIntyre	
1997	Robyn Nevin	Playbox Theatre	Rhoda Roberts	
1996	Peter J. Wilson	Jointly awarded to Company B Belvoir and Expressions Dance Company	Wendy Blacklock AM	
1995	Jointly awarded to Hannie Rayson and Paul Livingston	Tasmanian Symphony Orchestra	David Blenkinsop	
1994	Michael Kieran Harvey	Legs On The Wall		
1993	Geoffrey Rush	Doppio Teatro and Bangarra Dance Theatre	Marguerite Pepper	
1992	Meryl Tankard	Chrissie Parrott Dance Company	Lindy Davies	
1991	Kim Walker	Jointly awarded to Synergy and Chamber Made Opera	Phillip A'Vard	
1990	John Beckett	Bran Nue Day Productions		
1989	Sue Ingleton	Jointly awarded to One Extra Company and Bharatam Dance Company	Sir Rupert Hamer	
1988	Neil Armfield	Salamanca Theatre Company	John Larkin	
1987	Jointly awarded to Peter Wilson and Richard Bradshaw	Astra Chamber Music Society		
1986	Chris Westwood	Flederman Ensemble		
1985	Peter Oyston	Dance Works		
1984	Jack Davis	Jointly awarded to Circus Oz and Sydney Dance Company		
