= Stolen (play) =

Play written by Jane Harrison

Stolen is a play by Australian playwright Jane Harrison. It is based upon the lives of five indigenous people who dealt with the issues of forceful removal by the Australian government. It was published in 1998.

== Plot ==
Stolen tells the story of five Aboriginal children, who go by the names of Sandy, Ruby, Jimmy, Anne, and Shirley.

Sandy has spent his entire life on the run, never having a set home to live in. Stolen tracks his quest for a place to be, a place where he doesn’t have to keep hiding from the government (even though they are no longer after him), and a place he can call home.

Ruby was forced to work as a domestic from a young age and was driven insane by the abuse of her white masters. In the latter part of the play, she spends a lot of her time mumbling to herself, whilst her family desperately try to help her.

Jimmy was separated from his mother at a very young age, and she spent her entire life looking for him. He spent a lot of time in prison, and on the day he finally got out, he was told about his mother’s search. As he went to meet her, she died, and he committed suicide. Jimmy was led to believe that his mother was deceased as any letters written to him were taken away by the institution.

Anne was removed from her family and placed in a Caucasian family’s home. She was materially happy in this home, a lot happier than many of the other characters.

Shirley was removed from her parents and had her children removed from her. She only felt, safety, and comfort when her granddaughter was born, and not removed.

== Writing style ==
The play is split between the stories of the five characters, both as children and as adults. It leaps backwards and forwards through time without warning, and changes location quite dramatically. In one scene, the five children may be in a schoolyard, and in the next scene, one adult may be alone in their room, or taking care of their unstable brother. This is due to creating an almost 'memory like' form of a sequence, with each scene being connected by a stray thought instead of being connected in a chronological order. Because of these elements, which aren’t found in many plays, Stolen is a favourite on Australian high school syllabi.

- aboriginal children language
- native: yurringa= sun
- wrong pronunciation: pitcha=picture
- double negation
- monologues intermixed with dialogues
- alienation effects: rapid scene changes, projections, sound-effects
- Ironic elements (Welfare, Sandy)

== Original cast and crew ==
Stolen was performed at The C.U.B. Malthouse, Melbourne, on 21 October 1998, with the following cast and crew:

- Anne - Tammy Anderson
- Ruby - Kylie Belling
- Jimmy - Tony Briggs
- Shirley - Pauline Whyman
- Sandy - Stan Yarramunua
- Director - Wesley Enoch
- Designer - Richard Roberts
- Lighting Designer - Matt Scott
- Composer - David Chesworth

All of the other parts in the play (mainly offstage voices) were played by one of the five actors/actresses mentioned above.

== Touring ==
Stolen toured extensively throughout Australia. On top of its seven years in Melbourne (starting in 1998), it was also performed in Sydney, Adelaide, regional Victoria, Tasmania, the UK, Hong Kong, and Tokyo. Furthermore, readings were performed in Canada and New York City.

== Reception ==
Stolen won (along with Aliwa! by Dallas Winmar) the Kate Challis RAKA Award in 1998, on the back of largely successful first season.

Stolen is being studied on the Victorian Certificate of Education English syllabus, and the New South Wales Higher School Certificate syllabus. Many other schools throughout Australia have also placed Stolen on their English curriculum.

== See also ==
- Stolen Generations
