= Praiseworthy (novel) =

2023 novel by Alexis Wright

- Author: Alexis Wright
- Language: English
- Genre: Fiction
- Publisher: Giramondo Publishing
- Publication date: 1 April 2023
- Publication place: Australia
- Media type: Print, ebook
- Pages: 736 pp.
- Awards: James Tait Prize (2023); QLS — Fiction (2023); ALS Gold Medal (2024); Miles Franklin Award (2024); Stella Prize (2024)
- ISBN: 9781922725745
- OCLC: 1362528097
- Dewey Decimal: 823.914
- LC Class: PR9619.3.W67 P73 2024
- Preceded by: The Swan Book

Praiseworthy (2023) is a novel by Australian writer Alexis Wright. It was initially published by Giramondo Publishing in Australia in 2023.

Praiseworthy won many Australian literary awards, including the 2023 Queensland Literary Awards' Fiction Book Award, 2024 ALS Gold Medal, the 2024 Miles Franklin Award, and the 2024 Stella Prize. It also drew increased international recognition when it won the 2023 James Tait Black Memorial Prize and was shortlisted for the 2024 IMPAC. It has also been longlisted for the inaugural Climate Fiction Prize.

== Synopsis ==
The town of Praiseworthy, in Australia's north, is home to Cause Man Steel (also known as Widespread Planet), who sees an end-of-the-world crisis looming. His solution is to round up all the donkeys in the nearby area, arguing that they will be important when civilization collapses. He and his wife, Dance, who has become fascinated by moths and butterflies, and his sons (Aboriginal Sovereignty, who wants to commit suicide, and Tommyhawk, who wants to be adopted by the Minister for Aboriginal Affairs) have to live under a program similar to the 2008 Australian Federal Government intervention program, which attempts to regulate Aboriginal behavior. Cause and Dance are resented by the assimilationist citizens of Praiseworthy, especially the albino mayor Ice Pick and his followers the Ice Queens, and the town is consumed by religious fervor and Native Title land disputes.

Cause goes on a journey to seek the purest gray donkey to spearhead his plan, while Tommyhawk reports Aboriginal Sovereignty to the police for having an underaged girlfriend, after which Aboriginal Sovereignty drowns himself in the ocean. The citizens of Praiseworthy search for Aboriginal Sovereignty’s body amidst the intervention program. During a contentious meeting with a government representative, the ancestral spirits of the Aboriginal people destroy signs installed as part of the intervention with lightning, while the unruliness of Cause’s donkeys causes the town to turn even further against him. Dance, who has Chinese ancestry, seeks to escape to China with the help of people smugglers as the citizens of Praiseworthy reject her.

When Cause returns, Ice Pick and the other assimilationists accuse him of killing Aboriginal Sovereignty, and Ice Pick plays on government fear of Chinese influence by reporting his donkey scheme to the Minister for Aboriginal Affairs. Aboriginal Sovereignty’s body is picked up by a people-smuggling boat while his spirit watches. Widespread becomes disillusioned with the perfect donkey and decides to leave it in the outback with the original seller, abandoning Tommyhawk as well. Tommyhawk wanders the outback, haunted by visions of Aboriginal Sovereignty and beating a drum which causes a mysterious pulse throughout Praiseworthy. He releases the rest of the seller’s donkeys into the outback. Ice continues his radio broadcasts, increasingly focused on arresting Widespread, while his wife Maureen fights for his attention with the Ice Queens.

Eventually, Cause’s transport conglomerate transforms Praiseworthy, led by the descendants of the perfect donkey. The children of Praiseworthy almost run into the sea chasing butterflies, but are saved by a tidal wave.

== Epigraph ==
- "I am not even dust. I am a dream..." — Jorge Luis Borges

== Publishing history ==
After its initial publication in Australia by Giramondo Publishing in 2023, the novel was reprinted as follows:

- And Other Stories, UK, 2023
- New Directions, USA, 2024

== Critical reception ==
Mykaela Saunders, writing in Sydney Review of Books, noted that the novel "is classic Wright: a book made of beautiful, mutable and playful language, designed to be enjoyed."

In Australian Book Review Tony Hughes-d'Aeth called the novel a "worthy" successor to the author's previous two books, and went on: "One of the joys of reading Wright is the wry exasperation that permeates the narrator's voice. Praiseworthy's narration is a sustained rant that calls to mind the work of Thomas Bernhard or the quiet rage of Dostoyevsky. But as with the work of these great writers, there is always a gleam in the novel's eye that causes the story to hover between tragedy and farce. This undecidability is the symptom of the scale of the novel's address. Wright is that rare thing in Australian writing: a writer of political reality." They concluded: "Praiseworthy blew me away. If one wants to feel the grit of Indigenous sovereignty, or to see it working in its most unassimilable and joyously maddening forms, then Wright's new novel offers that possibility. It is a novel that runs rings around the mincing discourses of reconciliation. It seems to casually hold the whole universe in the teasing circularity of its incantations."

== Awards ==
| Year | Award | Category | Result | Ref |
|---|---|---|---|---|
| 2023 | James Tait Black Memorial Prize | — | Won | |
| 2023 | Queensland Literary Awards | Fiction Book Award | Won | |
| 2024 | ALS Gold Medal | — | Won | |
| 2024 | International Dublin Literary Award | — | Shortlisted | |
| 2024 | Margaret and Colin Roderick Literary Award | — | Shortlisted | |
| 2024 | Miles Franklin Award | — | Won | |
| 2024 | New South Wales Premier's Literary Award | Christina Stead Prize | Shortlisted | |
| 2024 | Stella Prize | — | Won | |
| 2024 | Voss Literary Prize | — | Won | |
| 2025 | Climate Fiction Prize | — | Longlisted | |
| 2026 | Kate Challis RAKA Award | — | Won | |

== See also ==
- 2023 in Australian literature

== Notes ==
- You can read an excerpt from the novel on The Wheeler Centre website.
