= Dallas Winmar =

Australian writer

- Occupation: Playwright

Dallas Winmar is a Western Australian writer who first worked with Company B in 2001 on the staging of her play Aliwa!. This play was first showcased in Perth by Yirra Yaakin Noongar Theatre and developed at the Australian National Playwrights Conference in 1999 and 2000.

She was commissioned by Kooemba Jdarra Indigenous Performing Arts to write Skin Deep for their 2000 program. Yibiyung, her third play, was workshopped at the Australian National Playwrights Conference in 2006 and the PlayWriting Australia National Script Workshop in 2007.

Dallas was jointly awarded the Kate Challis RAKA Award in 2002 for Aliwa! (alongside Jane Harrison for Stolen). Aliwa! was also shortlisted for the script category of the Western Australian Premier's Book Awards, and nominated for commendation for the Louis Esson Prize for Drama shortlist in 2003.

Winmar again won the Kate Challis RAKA Award in 2008 for Yibiyung.
