= Kylie Farmer =

Aboriginal Australian writer and director

Kylie Bracknell, formerly Kylie Farmer and also known as Kaarljilba Kaardn, is an Aboriginal Australian writer, director and actress.

== Career ==
Farmer played Juliet in a run of Romeo and Juliet with the Australian Shakespeare Company, featured in the 2010 revival of The Sapphires, appeared in Rima Tamou's film Sa Black Thing (an episode of the SBS TV series Dramatically Black) performed in the theatre production Aliwa!, appeared in Muttacar Sorry Business and is the face and narrator of the NITV series Waabiny Time.

As Kylie Bracknell, she acted in Nakkiah Lui's Black is the New White, appeared the feature film I Met a Girl, plays Ally in the animated TV show Little J & Big Cuz, and plays Piper in the TV series Irreverent.

Noongar language and culture has featured strongly in her career. She spent 11 years working at Yirra Yaakin Theatre Company, an Aboriginal-led theatre company based in Perth, in the heart of Noongar country.

In 2012, she translated a selection of Shakespeare's sonnets into Noongar and performed them at the Globe Theatre in London with fellow Noongar actors Kyle Morrison and Trevor Ryan.

In 2020, Bracknell co-translated and directed a critically acclaimed Noongar adaptation of Shakespeare's Macbeth, titled Hecate, the first full-length adaptation of a Shakespearean play performed in one Indigenous language of Australia. She followed this up in 2021 by co-translating, co-producing, and directing a Noongar language dub of the 1972 Bruce Lee film Fist of Fury, retitled Fist of Fury Noongar Daa. Bracknell has also co-translated and directed Noongar episodes of Little J & Big Cuz.

Bracknell was awarded the 2020 Sidney Myer Performing Arts Award.

== Language advocacy ==
Bracknell is a strong advocate for Aboriginal languages, with appearances at TEDxManly and on the ABC program Q&A.

In addition, she has taught Noongar language to young people in country towns through Community Arts Network's Noongar Pop Culture project, around Australia via the early years television series Waabiny Time, and in series of online language learning videos.

== Personal life ==
Her husband Clint Bracknell is a Noongar song-maker, composer, and Professor of Music at the University of Western Australia.

== Filmography ==
=== Film ===
Year	Title	Role	Notes
2009	Stone Bros.	Donna	Short film
2012	Brolga		Short film
2012	Ace of Spades	Annie	Short film
2016	Friendship Love & Loyalty	Denise	
2020	I Met a Girl	Amiya	

=== Television ===
Year	Title	Role	Notes
2005	Dramatically Black	Crystal	Episode: "Sa Black Thing"
2011	Waabiny Time		21 episodes
2013	Redfern Now	Lena	Episode: "Pokies"
2014	The Gods of Wheat Street	Jamie Lavelle	2 episodes
2017	Little J & Big Cuz	Ally	25 episodes
2022	Irreverent	Piper	10 episodes
