= No Sugar =

Play about indigenous people in Western Australia

- Paperback cover
- Original language: English
- Written by: Jack Davis
- Characters: See text
- Genre: Postcolonial play
- Setting: Western Australia

No Sugar is a postcolonial play written by Indigenous Australian playwright Jack Davis, set during the Great Depression, in Northam, Western Australia, Moore River Native Settlement and Perth. The play focuses on the Millimurras, an Australian Aboriginal family, and their attempts at subsistence.

The play explores the marginalisation of Aboriginal Australians in the 1920s and 1930s in Australia under the jurisdiction of a white government. The pivotal themes in the play include racism, white empowerment and superiority, Aboriginal disempowerment, the materialistic values held by the white Australians, Aboriginal dependency on their colonisers, and the value of family held by Aboriginal people.

The play was first performed by the Playhouse Company in association with the Australian Theatre Trust, for the Festival of Perth on 18 February 1985. It also was chosen as a contribution to Expo 86 in Canada No Sugar forms the first part of a trilogy, the First Born Trilogy, which also includes the titles The Dreamers and Barungin (Smell the Wind). The trilogy was first performed by the Melbourne Theatre Company in May 1988 at the Fitzroy Town Hall. The play won the 1987 Western Australian Premiers Award and in 1992 the Kate Challis RAKA Award for Indigenous Playwrights.

The play utilises the perambulant model, which is a technique used in drama to dislocate the audience involving multiple points of focus. Throughout No Sugar it is employed to convey a sense of displacement to the audience, representative of the isolation felt by the Aboriginal people unable and unwilling to assimilate to white culture.

== Characters ==
- Jimmy Munday (full name James Emmanuel Munday), the protagonist.
- Gran Munday, Jimmy's mother, a traditional Aboriginal woman.
- Milly Millimurra, Jimmy's sister, who has three children.
- Sam Millimurra (full name Samuel Nathaniel Millimurra), Milly's husband.
- Joe Millimurra, Mary's love interest and Milly's eldest son.
- Cissie Millimurra, Milly's daughter.
- David Millimurra - Milly's youngest son.
- A. O. Neville, Chief Protector of Aborigines.
- Miss Dunn, his secretary.
- Mr Neal, Superintendent of Moore River Native Settlement. Abuses Indigenous people and is lecherous to Indigenous girls.
- Matron Neal, his wife, Matron of the hospital.
- Sister Eileen, a Catholic missionary.
- Sergeant Carrol, sergeant of the Northam Police.
- Constable Kerr, member of the Northam Police.
- Frank Brown, an unemployed farmer who befriends Jimmy Munday and provides him with alcohol in Act One
- Mary Dargurru, Joe's love interest. An outspoken girl who is mistreated by Neal, works for the Matron at the settlement.
- Billy Kimberley, a Black tracker from the Kimberley region, an Aborigine working for Mr Neal.
- Bluey, a Black tracker.
- Topsy, Mary's subservient and submissive friend who also works for the Matron.
- Justice of the Peace, a farmer who sentences Frank Brown, Jimmy and Sam for alcohol abuse.

== Synopsis ==
=== Act One ===
Act one begins by depicting the Millimurra family sitting and working together in Government Well Aboriginal reserve, Northam. Gran and Milly wash clothes, while Jimmy sharpens an axe and Joe reads a centenary edition of the Western Mail newspaper, which describes “Australia’s present condition of hopeful optimistic prosperity,” which Sam is unimpressed by.

In Scene Two, Sergeant Carrol interrupts Frank Brown, an unemployed white farmer currently living in the area. The Sergeant remarks that he has seen Frank socialising with the Millimurra family, and suggests that Frank may be supplying liquor to them, which is illegal (The sergeant comes to this conclusion due to seeing Jimmy Millimurra drunk around town). The Sergeant suggests Frank leave town, but Frank refuses, saying that he has looked all around the area for work and found nothing, meaning that he is no longer able to afford a train ticket home.

The scene shifts to the other side of stage, where Miss Dunn and Mr Neville sit at desks in Perth. A sign hangs on the door saying “Government of Western Australia, Fisheries, Forestry, Wildlife and Aborigines.” Miss Dunn makes a phone call, attempting to sell her brother's motorcycle (her brother has failing to find work in Perth and is now in the South West). Neville comments that unemployment is at 30%, so this is hardly surprising. Neville dictates a note to a superior, reporting that the Department is running out of money, and suggests removing meat from Aboriginal Rations. Sergeant Carrol calls, stating that citizens have raised objections to the placement of the new Aboriginal reserve near their houses in Northam.

Sergeant Carrol is interrupted by the Millimurra family arriving to collect their rations. Milly asks why soap has been removed from the rations, to which Sergeant Carrol reports that it is now considered a "luxury item", and comments that the men in the family could work to afford it. Milly responds, saying that there is little work, and it is badly paid.

Neville finishes his letter, suggesting that every child is given a handkerchief, stating that “If you can successfully inculcate such basic but essential details of civilised living you will have helped them along the road to taking their place in Australian society.”

In Scene Three, Billy and Frank return to camp drunk.

In Scene Four, Jimmy and Sam are in the police lockup, overnight. Port wine is found in Jimmy's possessions. Jimmy plays the mouth organ until the Sergeant and Constable get irritated, and they take it off him; after this, he sings instead. He comments on the bucket he has been given as a toilet having a hole in it, and when he is dismissed, throws it against the wall, breaking it.

In Scene Five, a Justice of the Peace arrives, and sentences Jimmy, due to his prior criminal record, to three months of hard labour. Frank is given six weeks of hard labour, while Sam is given a fine.

In Scene Six, the Millimurras are around their camp at Government Well. Sam comments on having to carve posts to earn money to pay his fine.

In Scene Seven, Jimmy has finished his sentence in Fremantle and asks Mr Neville for a train fare back to Northam. He is dismissed repeatedly. Neville responds to another call from Sergeant Carrol, in which he states that the town council has knocked back another of his proposals for a site for the new Aboriginal reserve. The council has cited the reason that it has been planned for development, clearly a made up excuse in order to delay or prevent the building of the site. The Sergeant comments that "the Council's prefer if you sent 'em to Moore River or somewhere", to which Neville responds that "most councils would prefer that", but "the place is bursting at the seams". Back in Northam, Milly requests blankets from the rations, and is informed that meat is no longer included in their rations.

In Scene Eight, Jimmy returns to Northam, carrying food that he has bought in Perth after his sentence.

In Scene Nine, Neville is typing a list of warrants to move the residents of the Government Well reserve to Moore River. He states that a doctor in Northam has examined them and found cases of Scabies. He states that this transfer is only a temporary measure, for the purpose of quarantine. He describes his arrangements of a train car to pick up the residents. The sergeant suggests a road party in addition, to move luggage and horses, which Neville approves. Throughout the exchange, Neville makes clear that no dogs or livestock are to be taken, in particular the dogs since he says "the superintendent won't have any dogs coming with them to the settlement".

In Scene Ten, the Sergeant informs the Millimurra-Munday family in Northam that they have been transferred to the Moore River Native Settlement. Jimmy states that this is because the white population no longer wants them in Northam. Sam and Milly are arranged to go with the road party with their belongings, and the rest are told they are going by train. Gran protests and is allowed to go by road. Sergeant tells them that their dogs are not allowed to go, but relents and allows Wow Wow to go when Gran states that she will not go without him. The police escort Jimmy away, as the scene is ending

=== Act Two ===
Act two begins with the Millimurras arriving at Moore River Native Settlement.
