= Tracker (biography) =

2017 book by Alexis Wright

- Author: Alexis Wright
- Subject: Biography of Tracker Tilmouth
- Genre: Biography
- Publisher: Giramondo Publishing
- Publication date: 11/2017
- Publication place: Australia
- Pages: 640
- Awards: 2018 Stella Prize
- ISBN: 9781925336337

Tracker is a 2017 biography of Aboriginal activist Tracker Tilmouth by Alexis Wright. The book was published by Giramondo Publishing and was the winner of the 2018 Stella Prize, the 2018 Magarey Medal for Biography, and the 2018 Non-Fiction Book Award at the Queensland Literary Awards.

The book has been praised for its unorthodox approach to biography. Wright, inspired by Aboriginal storytelling traditions, aimed to construct the book as a "multi-vocal" text by presenting a collection of more than 50 interviews with Tilmouth and those who knew him.

== Summary ==
Tracker is a biography of Bruce "Tracker" Tilmouth, an Arrente man from the Alice Springs region. Tilmouth was a member of the Stolen Generations, having been taken from his father at the age of four and raised at the Croker Island Mission. Tilmouth later became an activist, helping to establish the Central Australian Aboriginal Legal Aid Service and serving as director of the Central Land Council. He was a lifelong member of the Australian Labor Party and was at one point considered as a potential Labor candidate for a vacant Senate seat in the Northern Territory, but was also fiercely critical of the party's attitude towards Aboriginal Australians throughout his life.

The biography is constructed as a collection of more than 50 interviews, including with Tilmouth himself. The book presents these interviews largely uninterrupted and without commentary, with only a short introduction by Wright.

== Reception ==
The book received widespread critical praise. Writing in The Guardian, Tegan Bennett Daylight called it "the most important Australian book of the 21st century". The judges of the 2018 Stella Prize called the book a "new way of writing memoir", while Bronte Coates wrote for Readings that the book was "a landmark work – epic in its scope and empathy".

Many reviewers commented on the unorthodox construction of the biography. Wright, an Aboriginal writer of the Waanyi nation, interviewed more than 50 people in writing Tracker, arranging their stories both thematically and chronologically to craft a narrative that has been described as "multi-vocal" and as a set of "collected fragments". Wright drew upon Aboriginal oral storytelling traditions, writing that "a Western-style biography would never work for someone like [Tracker]". The book was described in The Conversation as "written in the mode and genre of Aboriginal storytelling". Wright has described the book's style as "consensus storytelling", inspired by Aboriginal collective decision-making practices.

Writing in The Monthly, Frank Bongiorno wrote that this "total reliance on oral history" was not without problems, commenting that "aside from a brief introduction there is no authorial voice to help us interpret the contradictions in this material". But others praised the book's unorthodox approach; in The Guardian, Alex Gerrans wrote that the book was a "demonstration of the power of oral and collective storytelling". Phillip Hall wrote in the Plumwood Mountain Journal that the book "points the way forward to a new type of biographical method, one that esteems First Australian storytelling, tolerance and magnanimity". Reviewers were also torn on the book's length; some criticised its length of nearly 600 pages for being excessive, while others described it as "epic" in scale.

== Awards ==
Awards for Tracker
Year	Award	Result	Ref.
2018	Stella Prize	Winner	
2018	Magarey Medal	Winner	
2018	Queensland Literary Award for Non-Fiction	Winner	
2018	Victorian Premier's Literary Awards	Shortlisted	
2018	Colin Roderick Award	Shortlisted	
2018	Melbourne Prize for Literature	Finalist	
2018	ABIA Biography of the Year	Longlisted	
