= Shelley Gare =

Australian journalist and author (born 1952)

Shelley Gare (born 1952) is an Australian journalist and author, who is a contributing editor at The Australian Financial Review. She has held some of Australia's most senior magazine editor positions including editor of both Good Weekend and Sunday Life. Gare won a Walkley Award for her work as an editor of The Australian’s Review of Books (now Australian Literary Review).

== Early life and career ==
Gare was born Helen Shelley Gare in Carnarvon, Western Australia in 1952, the fourth and youngest child of public servant Frank Ellis Gare (Commissioner for Native Welfare for the State of Western Australia) and artist and novelist Nene Gare. Her brother is Arran Gare, a metaphysician and environmental philosopher, and her sister is Leif Frances, a qualified nursing sister. In 1954 the family moved from Carnarvon to Geraldton then in 1962 to Perth with her father's employment with the Native Welfare Department, where Shelley was educated at Santa Maria College, then trained as a cadet journalist on the Daily News. She moved to Sydney in her early 20s and became editor of Cleo magazine.

She moved to London to work for Australian Consolidated Press's Fleet St bureau, then as deputy editor on Company magazine and finally as deputy editor on the Look section of The Sunday Times, returning to Australia in 1986, where, after working as an assistant editor on The Herald in Melbourne, and then as editor of Good Weekend, she eventually became the first woman deputy editor appointed to The Australian newspaper. Gare was responsible for all newspaper features. She was also a consultant editor on the start-up of Who magazine, a sister magazine to the American People magazine.

Gare was a founding editor of The Australian’s Review of Books (now Australian Literary Review), for which she won a Walkley Award, a recognition of excellence in journalism. As a freelancer later, she was a regular contributor to a variety of publications.

Gare is the author of the 2006 book The Triumph of the Airheads and the Retreat from Commonsense.

As of 2012, Gare is a contributing editor at The Australian Financial Review, where she edits the Weekend Fin section for AFR Weekend.

== Articles ==
- "Death by Silence in the Writers' Combat Zone", July 2010, No. 36, Quadrant (magazine)
- "E-types reign in a rude new world", 14 December 2009, National Times
- "Making Trouble", August 2010, The Monthly

== Books ==
- My Life as a Father by Ross Campbell, edited by Shelley Gare, Media 21 Publishing, Sydney, 2005, ISBN 1-876624-71-X
- The Triumph Of The Airheads and the Retreat from Commonsense, Media 21 Publishing, Sydney, 2006, ISBN 1-876624-54-X
