= Winmar =

Winmar is a surname. Notable people with the surname include:

- Dallas Winmar (fl. 2001–2008), Australian playwright
- Nicholas Winmar (born 1991), Australian rules footballer
- Nicky Winmar (born 1965), Australian rules footballer
