= Arran Gare =

Australian philosopher (born 1948)

Arran E. Gare
- Born: 15 January 1948 (age 78); Subiaco, Western Australia

Philosophical work
- Era: Contemporary philosophy
- Region: Western Philosophy
- School: Process philosophy
- Main interests: Complex processes, environmental philosophy, philosophy of culture, metaphysical foundations of science, philosophy of economics

Arran Emrys Gare (/ɡɛər/; born 1948) is an Australian philosopher known mainly for his work in environmental philosophy, philosophy of science, philosophy of culture and the metaphysics of process philosophy. He currently holds the position of Associate Professor in the Faculty of Life and Social Sciences at Swinburne University of Technology in Melbourne, Australia.

== Biography ==
Gare is the son of Frank Gare ISO, former Commissioner for Native Welfare and Regional Director of Aboriginal Affairs in Western Australia, and Nene Gare, author of The Fringe Dwellers and other novels. He is also the brother of Shelley Gare, an Australian author and journalist.

Gare attended Applecross Senior High School, then graduated from the University of Western Australia with a BA (Hons) in philosophy. He then wrote his PhD, ("Science, Process Philosophy and the Image of Man: the metaphysical foundations for a critical social science"), at Murdoch University in which he formed his version of process metaphysics. On the basis of this he won a Postdoctoral Fulbright Fellowship to Boston University. Gare has taught at Murdoch University, University of Queensland, Curtin University and Swinburne University. In 2006 he was a Keynote Speaker to the 6th International Whitehead Conference at Salzburg University, Austria, delivering a paper entitled: "Reviving the Radical Enlightenment". More recently he has aligned himself with Chinese environmentalists in the quest to create a global ecological civilisation.

== Research ==
Gare's work is mainly in environmental philosophy, the history and philosophy of science and mathematics, philosophy of culture and the metaphysics of process philosophy. In 1983 with Robert Elliot he published Environmental Philosophy, one of the first anthologies in this field. In 1993 he published Nihilism Incorporated: European Civilization and Environmental Destruction and Beyond European Civilization: Marxism, Process Philosophy and the Environment, and then in 1995 Postmodernism and the Environmental Crisis. In these works he attempted to explain the ascendance, world domination and environmental destructiveness of European civilisation, the failure of orthodox Marxism as practised in the Soviet Union and Eastern Europe to provide a real alternative to this, and the ineffectuality of deconstructive postmodernism in the face of the ecological crisis confronting humanity, while offering a different path into the future based on a synthesis of process metaphysics, neo-Aristotelian ethics, neo-Hegelian political philosophy and eco-Marxism, attempting to overcome the opposition between science and the humanities. In 1996 he published Nihilism Inc.: Environmental Destruction and the Metaphysics of Sustainability.

In more recent work Gare has published in the fields of narratology, hermeneutics, semiotics, complexity theory, theoretical biology, human ecology and philosophical anthropology, Schelling's philosophy, Chinese philosophy and Christopher Alexander's theories of architecture, biomathematics and biosemiotics, and called for a revival of the Radical Enlightenment as the true heir of the Renaissance struggle for democracy and for the creation of an ecological civilisation as a new world order based on a new relationship between humanity and nature. More specifically, he has been concerned to revive and reformulate on naturalistic foundations the ethics and political philosophy of the liberal socialists inspired by T.H. Green, develop more adequate theoretical foundations for human ecology and ecological economics to provide an alternative to neo-classical economics as the core discipline for formulating public policy, and develop a form of retrospective path analysis as an alternative to cost-benefit analysis as a framework for formulating such policy. These ideas have been synthesised in his book The Philosophical Foundations of Ecological Civilization: A manifesto for the future published in 2016. Such work revives the traditional ambitions of philosophy, and as such, is a challenge to philosophy's current marginalization. In defence of his conception of philosophy he has worked to revive the tradition of speculative naturalism, an outcome of which has been the publication in 2017 of the anthology For a New Naturalism, co-edited with Wayne Hudson.

A critical review of his work has been made from within the domain of process philosophy by McLaren.

== Cosmos and History ==
He is the founder and a chief editor of the online journal Cosmos and History: The Journal of Natural and Social Philosophy , which is a peer-reviewed, open-access journal of natural and social philosophy. Quoting the journal: "It serves those who see philosophy's vocation in questioning and challenging prevailing assumptions about ourselves and our place in the world, developing new ways of thinking about physical existence, life, humanity and society, so helping to create the future insofar as thought affects the issue. Philosophy so conceived is not exclusively identified with the work of professional philosophers, and the journal welcomes contributions from philosophically oriented thinkers from all disciplines."

== Other positions ==
- The founder and director of the Joseph Needham Centre for Complex Processes Research.
- A founder and first chairman of the board of the education cooperative 'Akademos'.
- One of the founders of the Association for the Public University.
- Senior Researcher of the Institute for the Postmodern Development of China. China Project of the Center for Process Studies, Claremont, California.
- Since 2005, a member of the International Advisory Board, The International Journal of Inclusive Democracy.
- Since 2009, consultant, Research Office for Ecological Civilization, Beijing, China.
- Since 2012, Member of the Scientific Advisory Board, BIOmathics Support Action, Europe.
- Since 2012, member of the Advisory Board, Capitalism, Nature, Socialism (Routledge, Taylor & Francis Group).
- Since 2020, Advisor to the new Russian journal "Ecopoiesis: Eco-Human Theory and Practice". The 30 May 2020 issue contains an interview with him entitled "Toward an Ecological Civilization - An interview with Arran Gare".

== Publications ==
- (1983) Robert Elliot and Arran E. Gare eds, Environmental Philosophy (St Lucia: U.Q.P.; London: Open University Press; University Park: Penn. State University Press).
- (1993) Arran Gare, Nihilism Incorporated: European Civilization and Environmental Destruction (Bungendore: Eco-Logical Press; Cambridge: Whitehorse Press). Read online
- (1993) Arran Gare, Beyond European Civilization: Marxism, Process Philosophy and the Environment (Bungendore: Eco-Logical Press, Cambridge: Whitehorse Press). Read online
- (1995) Arran Gare, Postmodernism and the Environmental Crisis (London: Routledge).
- (1996) Arran Gare, Nihilism Inc.: Environmental Destruction and the Metaphysics of Sustainability (Sydney: Eco-Logical Press). Read online
- (2000) Arran Gare, Aleksandr Bogdanov and Systems Theory (Democracy & Nature, Vol. 6, No. 3, 2000). Read online
- (2016) Arran Gare, Philosophical Foundations of Ecological Civilization: A Manifesto for the Future (London: Routledge).
- (2017) Arran Gare and Wayne Hudson eds, For a New Naturalism (Candor, New York: Telos Press).
