= Aliwa! =

Play

Aliwa
- Author: Dallas Winmar
- Cover artist: Kate Florance
- Language: English
- Genre: Play
- Publisher: Currency Press
- Publication date: 2002
- Publication place: Australia
- Media type: Print (Paperback)
- ISBN: 978-0-86819-688-6

Aliwa! is a play by Indigenous Australian playwright Dallas Winmar, and published by Currency Press in 2002.

== Plot ==
Based on a true story of a mother who tries to keep her three daughters from being taken away by officials after the death of her husband. It was later presented by Company B, was directed by Neil Armfield, starred Ningali Lawford, Kylie Belling and Deborah Mailman and was introduced by one of the sisters the play is based on, Aunty Dot Collard.

== First production ==
Aliwah! was first produced by Yirra Yaakin Noongar Theatre at the Subiaco Theatre, Perth, on 26 July 2000, with the following cast:

- Mum / Alice, Dot, Reserve Boy: Rachael Maza
- Judith, School Teacher: Irma Woods
- Ethel, Native Welfare Officer: Kylie Farmer
- Director, Lynette Narkle
- Designer, Tish Oldham
- Sound and original music, David Milroy
- Lighting Designer, Mark Howett

== Awards ==
Aliwa! won the 2002 Kate Challis RAKA Award and was shortlisted for the 2002 Western Australian Premier's Book Awards and the 2003 Victorian Premier's Literary Awards - Louis Esson Prize for Drama.
