= Jagardoo: Poems from Aboriginal Australia =

Second collection of poems by Noongar playwright and poetry Jack Davis

Jagardoo: Poems from Aboriginal Australia, published in 1978, is the second collection of poems by Noongar playwright and poet Jack Davis, often referred to as the 20th Century's Aboriginal Poet Laureate.
