= Tracker Tilmouth =

Kwementyaye Tilmouth
- Born: 1954; Alice Springs region of Northern Territory, Australia
- Died: 28 February 2015 (aged 60–61); Darwin, Northern Territory, Australia
- Other name: Leigh Bruce "Tracker" Tilmouth
- Occupations: Activist, Former Director of Central Land Council of Northern Territory
- Known for: Contributions to Aboriginal Civil Rights Movement; Being a member of the stolen generation

Leigh Bruce ‘Tracker’ Tilmouth (1954 – 28 February 2015) was a Northern Territory Aboriginal activist.

Tilmouth was an Arrernte man who was born in the Alice Springs region. He was part of the Stolen Generations, being taken from his family at the age of three to Retta Dixon Home in Darwin and later raised on Croker Island.

Tilmouth helped establish the Central Australian Aboriginal Legal Aid Service and the Aboriginal health service in the south of the Northern Territory. He also served as director of the Central Land Council. He was a lifetime member of the Australian Labor Party and was, before pulling out, in the running to be the party's senator for the Northern Territory.

Tilmouth died on Saturday 28 February 2015 after suffering with cancer and heart complications. He was given a state funeral at St Mary's Cathedral in Darwin on 12 March 2015.

== Resources about ==
A biography of Tilmouth, entitled Tracker: stories of Tracker Tilmouth was published by Alexis Wright in 2017. Following its publication it won the following prizes in 2018; the Stella Prize, the Magarey Medal for biography and the Queensland Literary Award for non-fiction.
