= The Fringe Dwellers =

- Theatrical poster
- Directed by: Bruce Beresford
- Written by: Bruce Beresford; Rhoisin Beresford
- Produced by: Sue Milliken
- Starring: Kristina Nehm; Justine Saunders; Kylie Belling
- Cinematography: Donald McAlpine
- Edited by: Tim Wellburn
- Music by: George Dreyfus
- Release date: October 1986
- Running time: 98 minutes
- Country: Australia
- Language: English
- Budget: A$1.26 million
- Box office: $174,433 (Australia)

The Fringe Dwellers is a 1986 film directed by Bruce Beresford, based on the 1961 novel The Fringe Dwellers by Western Australian author Nene Gare. The film is about a young Aboriginal girl who dreams of life beyond the family camp that sits on the fringe of white society (the term fringe dwellers having specific application in Australia).

The film is acclaimed as being the first Australian film featuring Indigenous actors in all the major roles. It achieved critical and international success when it was released in 1986, but only gained a mediocre reception in Australia.

== Plot ==
Trilby (Kristina Nehm) is a young Aboriginal woman living with her people on the outskirts of everyday Australian society. Trilby encourages her mother (Justine Saunders) to apply for a Housing Commission home being built in an area inhabited mostly by wealthier white families. Her mother, sister Noonah, and Trilby save enough for them all (father and younger brother as well) to move there from the "fringe". They buy some new furniture for the house and improve their station in life, but there is a culture clash. Trilby learns her family is actually happier surrounded by their community and extended family, and that her own goals are not necessarily the goals of others in her life. With xenophobic neighbours casting a constant judgemental eye, Trilby and her boyfriend, Phil (Ernie Dingo), attempt to find happiness in their new environment. Trilby becomes pregnant, gives birth, but drowns her baby, making it look like an accident. Her family leave their suburban house after Trilby's father loses all their rent money in a card game: the family return to their house in the camp. Trilby, however, leaves on a bus bound for the city.

== Cast ==
- Justine Saunders as Mollie Comeaway
- Kristina Nehm as Trilby Comeaway
- Kylie Belling as Noonah Comeaway
- Bob Maza as Joe Comeaway
- Denis Walker as Bartie Comeaway
- Ernie Dingo as Phil
- Oodgeroo Noonuccal as Eva (billed as Kath Walker)
- Marlene Bell as Hannah
- Malcolm Silva as Charlie
- Michele Miles as Blanchie
- Michelle Torres as Audrena
- Lisa-Jane Stockwell as Matron
- Gordon Beitzel as the Publican
- Laurie Foell as Waitress

== Production ==
Beresford had been interested in making a film from the novel since he read it in the mid-1970s, buying his copy at a second-hand book shop in London. Funding was difficult to raise, but eventually was done through the Australian Film Commission and Queensland Film Corporation. The Fringe Dwellers was shot in Cherbourg and Murgon, Queensland, Australia.

== Awards ==
The film was nominated for seven AFI Awards and won for the Best Adapted Screenplay (Bruce Beresford, Rhoisin Beresford). It was also entered into the 1986 Cannes Film Festival. Cinema Papers reported that "three Aboriginal activists walked out" of the screening at Cannes, without naming them or giving any further details. This claim is repeated in David Stratton's book The Avocado Plantation. However, this is difficult to substantiate and the Sydney Morning Herald reported that there were "no mass walkouts".

== Box office ==
The Fringe Dwellers grossed $174,433 at the box office in Australia.

== See also ==
- Cinema of Australia
