= Archival-Poetics =

2019 book of poetry by Natalie Harkin

- Author: Natalie Harkin
- Publisher: Vagabond Press
- Publication date: 2019
- Awards: Kate Challis RAKA Award

Archival-Poetics is a book of poetry by the Australian poet and Narungga woman Natalie Harkin. It was first published in 2019 by Vagabond Press.

It won the Kate Challis RAKA Award in 2020.

== About the work ==
Archival-Poetics is inspired by letters written by Harkin's grandmother and other family members. The letters were kept in the South Australia Aboriginal Records archive. The poetry collection consists of three chapbooks in a slipcase, where each chapbook's cover shows an image from a performance by Harkin titled Archive-Fever-Paradox, a reference to Jacques Derrida's book Archive Fever. The book is "a collage of archival extracts together with the writer's poetry, artwork, weaving and installation photo-stills", a form of docu-poetry.

Rather than a family memoir, Archival-Poetics "re-enacts the experience of confronting the record, with its heart-stopping shocks of finding her loved ones negated".

== Reception ==
The book won the Kate Challis RAKA Award in 2020. It received positive reviews in several literary journals.
