= The Swan Book =

Novel by Alexis Wright

- First edition cover
- Author: Alexis Wright
- Cover artist: Darren Gilbert
- Language: English
- Genre: Fiction
- Publisher: Giramondo Publishing
- Publication date: 2013
- Publication place: Australia
- Media type: Print (paperback)
- Pages: 339 pp
- ISBN: 978-1-922146-83-0
- OCLC: 849317121
- Preceded by: Carpentaria

The Swan Book is the third novel by the Indigenous Australian author Alexis Wright. It met with critical acclaim when it was published in 2013, and was shortlisted for Australia's premier literary prize, the Miles Franklin Award.

== Premise ==
The Swan Book is set in a dystopian future shaped by the impacts of climate change in which Aboriginal people still live under the Intervention in the north. They face both cultural and environmental challenges, which pervade the novel's landscape regularly. The central character, Oblivia, a young Aboriginal woman, grapples with the enduring traumas of her past and establishes a unique bond with swans. Pulled from a tree as a child after having been lost and gang raped, she is raised by a European immigrant, who shapes her worldview. After the death of her guardian, she is thrust into the national spotlight when she marries Warren Finch, an Aboriginal man who rises to become the first Indigenous President of Australia. Though married to Warren, Oblivia remains emotionally distant, haunted by her past and connection to the swans. The marriage is more political than personal, and Oblivia struggles to find her place in an alien and hostile world, retaining a childlike mind even as an adult.

Interweaving Aboriginal mythology, ecological motifs, and post-colonial analysis, the narrative presents an examination of Australia's environmental and societal challenges.

== Characters ==
Oblivia Ethylene:  Protagonist, Australia's First Lady

Bella Donna: Adoptive Mother, Climate Refugee

Harbour Master: Elder in the Detention Camp

Rigoletto: Speaking Monkey

Warren Finch: First Aboriginal President of Australia, husband to Oblivia

== Reviews ==
- Gleeson-White, Jane. "Going viral" 2013-08-23. Retrieved 2015-07-03.
- Tierney, James. "The Swan Book" 2015-02-10. Retrieved 2015-07-03.
- Webb, Jen. "Living wound: The Swan Book" 2013-09. Retrieved 2015-07-03.

== Awards and nominations ==
Year	Award	Category	Result	Ref
2014	ALS Gold Medal	—	Won	
2014	Miles Franklin Award	—	Shortlisted	
2014	New South Wales Premier's Literary Awards	Christina Stead Prize for Fiction	Shortlisted	
2014	Stella Prize	—	Shortlisted	
2014	Victorian Premier's Literary Awards	Indigenous Writing	Shortlisted	
2016	Kate Challis RAKA Award	—	Won	
