= Naked Under Capricorn =

- Based on: Naked Under Capricorn by Olaf Ruhen
- Written by: Peter Yeldham
- Directed by: Rob Stewart
- Starring: Nigel Havers; Noni Hazlehurst; David Gulpilil; John Jarratt; John Stanton
- Country of origin: Australia
- Original language: English
- No. of episodes: 2 x 2 hours

Production
- Producer: Ray Alchin
- Budget: $4.2 million

Original release
- Network: Nine Network
- Release: 17 September – 18 September 1989

Naked Under Capricorn is a 1989 Australian mini series about a young man lost in the Australian desert.

== Cast ==
- Nigel Havers as Davy Marriner
- Noni Hazlehurst as Monica Marriner
- David Gulpilil as Activity
- John Jarratt as Bluey Dallas
- John Stanton as Edrington
- Alfred Bell as Mission Mo
- Kym Van-Iersel as Trubbity
- Penny Cook as Peggy Delaney
- Mark Lee as Tim Roberts
- Kylie Belling as Casey
- Charles Tingwell as Wilson
- Ned Manning as Tim Copeland

== Production ==
Lee Robinson tried to get the rights to the book in the 1950s but it was optioned by MGM.
