= Hannie Rayson =

Australian playwright and newspaper columnist

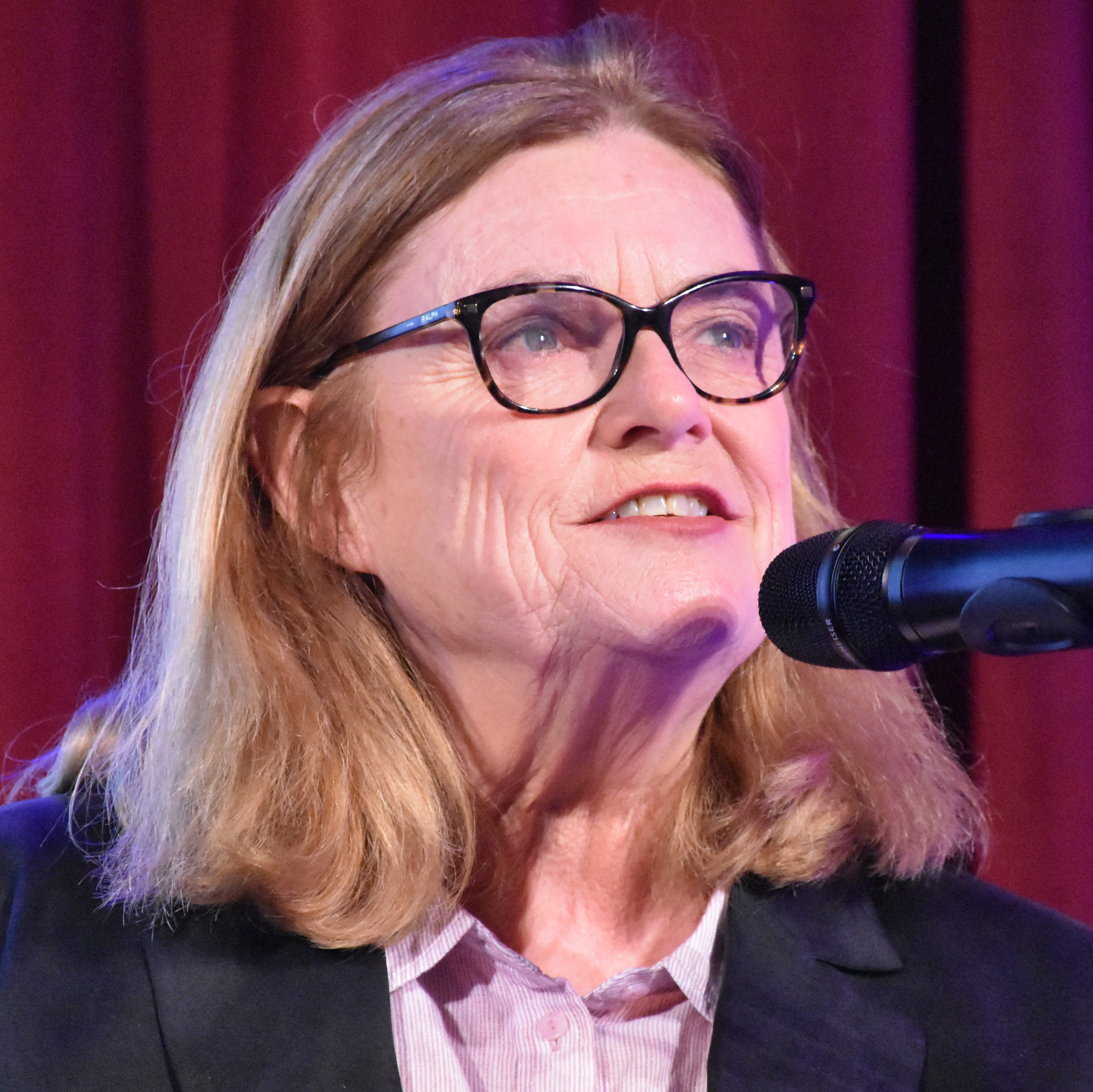
Rayson in 2025 at Queenscliffe Literary Festival

Hannie Rayson (born 1957) is an Australian playwright and newspaper columnist.

== Biography ==
Rayson was born in Melbourne, Victoria and graduated from the University of Melbourne and the Victorian College of Arts. She has worked as a freelance journalist and editor in addition to her primary career as playwright and screenwriter. Rayson was the co-founder of the community theatre group Theatreworks in Melbourne's inner eastern suburb of St Kilda, working there for four years while writing. Rayson has been writer-in-residence at Geelong's Mill Theatre, Playbox Theatre, La Trobe University (which has awarded her an Honorary Doctorate of Letters), and Monash University.

Rayson's first major success was Hotel Sorrento, which won several prizes including an AWGIE Award. The play has become an Australian classic, regularly performed by regional theatre groups, and appearing in university courses and on the high school syllabus. The film of the play, directed by Richard Franklin, won an AFI Award for best screenplay (Peter Fitzpatrick and Franklin). In 2010, the play's London debut won critical acclaim.

Her more recent works are Falling from Grace, Scenes from a Separation (written with Andrew Bovell), Competitive Tenderness, Life After George, Inheritance, The Glass Soldier, The Swimming Club and Extinction.

Rayson was the joint recipient of the Sidney Myer Performing Arts Award in 1996 and has won Victorian and New South Wales Premier's Literary Awards and the Helpmann Award for Best New Australian Work. She is the only playwright ever to be nominated for the Miles Franklin Award, for Life After George.

In 2015, Rayson published a funny and candid memoir called Hello, Beautiful! (Text Publishing).

Her TV writing credits include two episodes of SeaChange.

== Selected works ==
=== Plays ===
- Please Return To Sender (1980)
- Mary (1981)
- Leave It Till Monday (1984)
- Room To Move (1985)
- Hotel Sorrento (1990)
- Falling From Grace (1994)
- Scenes From A Separation (1995) co-written with Andrew Bovell
- Competitive Tenderness (1996)
- Life After George (2000)
- Inheritance (2003)
- Two Brothers (2005)
- The Glass Soldier (2008)
- The Swimming Club (2010)
- Extinction (2013)

=== Books ===
- Hello, Beautiful!: Scenes from a life (Text Publishing, 2015)

== Awards ==
- Sidney Myer Performing Arts Award (1996)
- Victorian Premier's Literary Award
- NSW Premier's Literary Awards Play Award for Hotel Sorrento (1991) and Falling from Grace (1995)
- Helpmann Award for Best New Australian Work for Inheritance (2004)
- Helpmann Award for Best Play awarded to productions of Life After George (2001) and Inheritance (2004)
- Two Australian Writers' Guild Awards.
