= Weet weet =

Aboriginal Australian children's game

Weet weet (also called wit-wit or throwing the play stick) is an Australian Aboriginal children's throwing game popular in some parts of Australia. Weet weet is also the traditional name of the object that is thrown, but it is also called a "kangaroo rat". A traditional weet weet it is difficult to recreate, so a club can be used and small children can play the game using a tennis ball placed in a stocking. The winner is the person to throw the weet weet the furthest or most accurately.

== Samuel Clemens, Mark Twain and weet-weet ==
The famous writer Mark Twain as an example of wit and intelligence of the Australian Aboriginal people wrote a chapter in his book Following the Equator about the weet-weet (or kangaroo-rat) But the mentioned chapter is not a simple description of an exotic toy, it is a blunt and critical summary of the white man's genocide actions against indigenous.

In the past Aboriginal Australians used weet weets for hunting.
