= Jane Harrison (playwright) =

Indigenous Australian playwright and writer

Jane Harrison is an Aboriginal Australian playwright, novelist, literary festival director, and researcher. She is known for her 1998 play Stolen, which received critical acclaim and has toured nationally and internationally, and The Visitors first produced in 2020 which has been developed as a play, opera and novel. Harrison has been inducted onto the Victorian Honour Roll of Women.

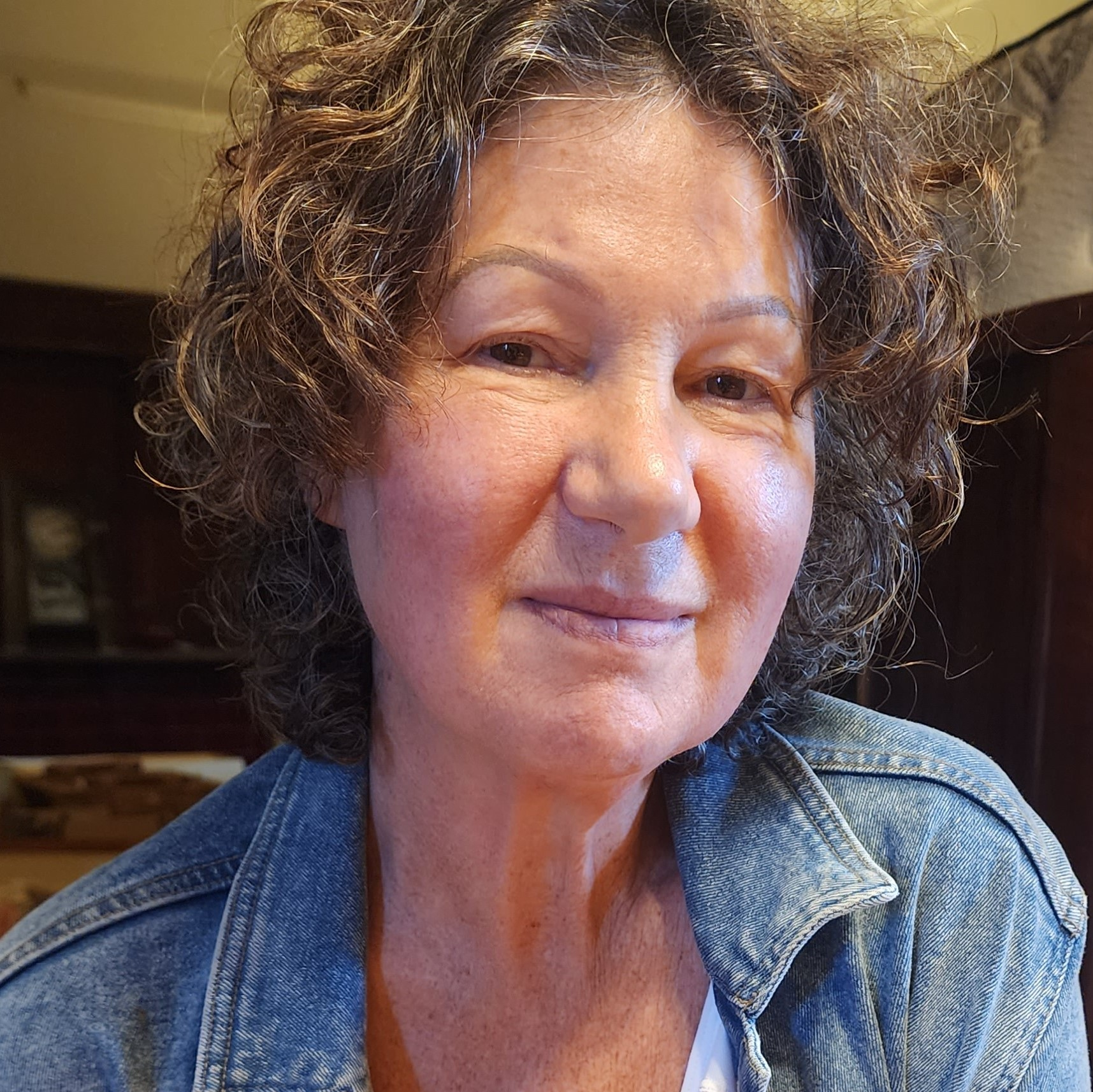
Jane Harrison

== Early life and education ==
Jane Harrison is a descendant of the Muruwari people of New South Wales, from the area around Bourke and Brewarrina.

She grew up in the Dandenong Ranges in Victoria with her mother and sister, and began her career as an advertising copywriter.

== Plays ==
=== Bennelong in London ===
Harrison’s most recent play Bennelong in London premieres as a Sydney Theatre Company production in its 2026 season. Woollarawarre Bennelong was a senior man of the Eora at the time of the initial British invasion of the Australian continent, who became the first Indigenous Australian envoy to Europe.

=== The Visitors ===
The Visitors re-imagines the arrival of the First Fleet on Gadigal country from the perspective of seven elders meeting on the shores of the harbour.

The Visitors was initially workshopped at the Yellamundie Festival in 2013, before a development at the Melbourne Theatre Company Cybec Electric series / Melbourne Indigenous Festival in 2014, directed by Leah Purcell. The Visitors premiered as a full production in January 2020 as part of the Sydney Festival. It was awarded the prize for Best New Australian Work, 2022 Sydney Theatre Awards, and was shortlisted for the Nick Enright Prize for Playwriting at the 2021 New South Wales Premier's Literary Awards.

Sydney Theatre Company and Moogahlin Performing Arts produced a second production of The Visitors at the Sydney Opera House in September / October 2023, directed by Wesley Enoch. This production won the 2023 Sydney Theatre Awards for Best Mainstage Production, and Best Ensemble, and went on to tour regional Australia in 2024. The production toured internationally, presented at the Perelman Performing Arts Center also known as 6 World Trade Center in New York City in January 2026, and the Auckland Arts Festival in March 2026.

Victorian Opera commissioned Harrison to collaborate with composer Christopher Sainsbury to develop an operatic version of The Visitors, staged at Arts Centre Melbourne in October 2023.

The opera was listed on the Victorian Certificate of Education 2023 curriculum.

=== Stolen ===
Stolen premièred in 1998 at Playbox (now Malthouse Theatre) in Melbourne, directed by Wesley Enoch. It was followed by seven annual seasons in Melbourne, plus tours to Sydney, Adelaide, regional Victoria, Tasmania, the United Kingdom (twice), Hong Kong and Tokyo, with readings in Canada, New York City, and Los Angeles. In Sydney, it was performed at the Sydney Theatre Company, directed by Wayne Blair.

Stolen is a play about the lives of five Indigenous Australian people from the Stolen Generations. For Stolen Harrison was awarded the Australian Writers' Guild AWGIE Nomination, was co-winner of the Kate Challis RAKA Award, and received an Honourable Mention in the CACS National Awards Individual Category for An Outstanding Contribution to Australian Culture. Stolen has been studied on the Victorian Certificate of Education and New South Wales Higher School Certificate English and drama syllabi. Australian Book Review called the play "a contemporary classic".

Sydney Theatre Company staged a new production of Stolen in its 2024 season, directed by Ian Michael.

=== Rainbow's End ===
Rainbow's End premiered in 2005, and toured Melbourne, Sydney, regional Australia, and Japan in 2007, and has had numerous subsequent productions. Harrison was awarded the Drover Award (Tour of the Year) and a Helpmann Awards nomination for Best Regional Touring Production. It has been studied on the New South Wales Higher School Certificate and is currently on the Victorian Certificate of Education English syllabus. Rainbow's End tells the simple, yet convoluted story of three generations of First Nations women; young Dolly, her mother the happy-go-lucky Gladys, and the wise and stern Nan Dear, living in their shanty perched on the flats of the Goulburn River in 1950s regional Victoria. The play was initially directed by Wesley Enoch.

=== On a Park Bench ===
On a Park Bench was created through workshops at Playbox and the Banff playRites Colony in 2002. The play was a finalist in the Lake Macquarie Drama Prize.

=== Blakvelvet ===
Blakvelvet won the 2006 Theatrelab Indigenous Award.

== Novels and short stories ==
=== The Visitors ===
The narrative arc presented in Harrison's play The Visitors is reconceptualized as a literary novel, also called The Visitors, published by HarperCollins in 2023. The novel was named Debut Fiction book of the year in the 2024 Indie Book Awards.

=== Becoming Kirrali Lewis ===
Harrison's novel, Becoming Kirrali Lewis, won the State Library of Queensland 2014 black&write! Indigenous Writing Fellowship, was shortlisted in the Prime Minister's Literary Awards 2016, and was Highly Commended in the Victorian Premier's Literary Awards 2016. Becoming Kirrali Lewis is a coming-of-age teen fiction novel about the search by Stolen Generations member Kirrali Lewis for her biological parents, which turns stereotypes on their heads. Becoming Kirrali Lewis was published by Magabala Books in 2015.

=== Born, Still ===
Short story, Born, Still, was published by the State Library of Queensland in Writing Black: New Indigenous Writing from Australia, launched in May 2014, and in the anthology Flock published by University of Queensland Press in 2021. Born, Still is a gentle reflection on the death of a daughter before birth.

Born, Still was subsequently re-worked as a play, workshopped at the National Play Conference in 2018 with a reading at the Melbourne Writers Festival also in 2018.

=== First Nations Monologues ===
First Nations Monologues (edited by Harrison) is an anthology of 30 contemporary First Nations playwrights’ most notable theatrical monologues, published by Currency Press in 2023.

=== Little J & Big Cuz ===
Harrison has written for Little J & Big Cuz, an Australian First Nations animated television series first screened on the NITV network and subsequently on ABC television. The series won the 2018 Logie Award for Most Outstanding Children's Program.

=== Healing our communities, healing ourselves ===
Harrison confessed in 2010 to her own struggles with mental health in an essay published in the Medical Journal of Australia. At a time when mental health was a career-ending stigma, she did so as a platform for talking about First Nations' mental health more broadly. Harrison's essay Healing Our Communities, Healing Ourselves argued that First Nations people faced the dual challenge of transgenerational trauma and its associated impact on mental health, in parallel with the more widely acknowledged structural barriers. She argued "a healthy First Nations person and community represents best practice" but that "we First Nations workers travel a parallel journey, working to improve our community's wellbeing, while sometimes struggling with our own". In recognition of her contribution to mental health awareness the Medical Journal of Australia awarded Harrison the Dr Ross Ingram Essay Prize.

== Other works ==
Harrison created and led Blak & Bright - First Nations Literary Festival in Naarm (Melbourne) from its inception in 2015 as the role of artistic director / CEO until August 2024. Blak & Bright is a bi-annual four-day festival celebrating the diverse expressions of First Nations story-tellers, the only major First Nations literary festival in Australia.

"Indig-curious; Who can play Aboriginal roles?" (2012) explores the issues raised by Aboriginal identity in theatre. The essay was derived from Harrison's University of Queensland Masters Exegesis.

Harrison contributed a chapter to Many Voices, Reflections on experiences of Indigenous child separation, which was published in 2002 by the National Library of Australia, Canberra. This work was also related to the theme of the Stolen Generations.

== Awards and honours ==
| Year | Patron | Category | Title | Award | Ref |
|---|---|---|---|---|---|
| 2026 | Mona Brand Award | Outstanding Australian woman writing for the stage or screen | Herself | Winner | |
| 2025 | Victorian Honour Roll of Women | Change Agent | Herself | Inductee | |
| 2024 | Indie Book Awards | Debut fiction | The Visitors | Winner | |
| 2024 | Creative Australia | BR Whiting Studio Residency | Herself | Recipient | |
| 2024 | Sydney Theatre Awards | Best Mainstage Production | The Visitors | Winner | |
| 2024 | Sydney Theatre Awards | Best Ensemble | The Visitors | Winner | |
| 2023 | Sidney Myer Performing Arts Awards | Individual category | Herself | Winner | |
| 2022 | Sydney Theatre Awards | Best New Australian Work | The Visitors | Winner | |
| 2021 | New South Wales Premier's Literary Awards | Nick Enright Prize for Playwriting | The Visitors | Shortlist | |
| 2016 | Victorian Premier's Literary Awards | Writing for Young Adults | Becoming Kirrali Lewis | Highly commended | |
| 2016 | Prime Minister's Literary Awards | Young Adult Literature | Becoming Kirrali Lewis | Shortlisted | |
| 2014 | State Library of Queensland | Black & Write! Indigenous Writing Fellowship | Becoming Kirrali Lewis | Winner | |
| 2012 | Drovers Award | Tour of the Year | Rainbow's End | Winner | |
| 2012 | Helpmann Awards | Best Regional Touring Production | Rainbow's End | Nomination | |
| 2012 | British Council | Indigenous Arts Leadership Accelerate program | Herself | Recipient | |
| 2010 | Medical Journal of Australia | Dr Ross Ingram Essay Prize | Healing our communities healing ourselves | Winner | |
| 2009 | Interpretation Australia | Excellence in Heritage Interpretation | Crime and Justice Experience at the Old Melbourne Gaol | Winner (contributing writer) | |
| 2007 | Peter Holmes a Court Indigenous Playwriting Award | n/a | Can White Girls Dreamtime? | Winner | |
| 2006 | Theatrelab | Indigenous Award | Blakvelvet | Winner | |
| 1998 – 2002 | Kate Challis RAKA Award | Play writing | Stolen | Co-winner | |
| 1998 – 2002 | Lake Macquarie Drama Prize | n/a | On a Park Bench | Finalist | |
| 1998 – 2002 | Australian Writers' Guild | AWGIE | Stolen | Nomination | |
| 1998 – 2002 | CACS National Awards | Outstanding Contribution to Australian Culture | Stolen | Honourable Mention | |
