= Kylie Belling =

Australian actress (born 1964)

- Born: 22 November 1964 (age 61); Melbourne, Victoria, Australia
- Education: University of Melbourne
- Occupations: Actress, voice artist, aboriginal activist

Kylie Belling (born 22 November 1964) is an Australian stage, film and television actress and voice artist, who has also worked in other occupations. As of 2019 she works as Senior Manager, First Peoples, for Creative Victoria.

== Biography ==
Belling was born in Melbourne and is of Yorta Yorta/Wiradjuri/South Sea Islander heritage. She graduated from the University of Melbourne Victorian College of the Arts in 1985. She qualified as a secondary school teacher, later becoming a Master of Public Health. In 2017 she completed the Williamson Community Leadership Program. She has been active in Aboriginal community affairs in Victoria, working in various sectors for many statewide community and government organisations.

Belling is known for her television work. She played inmate Sarah West in Prisoner and was also an original cast member of The Flying Doctors as Sharon Herbert. Belling had an ongoing role in the series The Genie from Down Under, and in Redfern Now as Patricia.

In film, she was nominated for an AFI Award for Best Supporting Actress for The Fringe Dwellers in 1986. She is also known for her role in the 2012 movie The Sapphires as Geraldine.

Belling was also the first actress to play Ruby in the Indigenous Australian play Stolen in 1998, a role she reprised in 2000 and 2003, in several performances across Australia and internationally. She also played many other stage roles between 1985 and 2008.

She co-founded the Ilbijerri Aboriginal and Torres Strait Islander Theatre Cooperative in Melbourne in about 1991, also performing the role of artistic director.

== Recognition ==
She has won a Deadly Award, a Koorie Women Mean Business Arts Award, and a Sydney Myer Performing Arts Indigenous Award.

== Filmography ==
=== Film ===
Year	Title	Role	Notes
1986	The Fringe Dwellers	Noonah Comeaway	
1987	Ground Zero	Receptionist	
1988	Damned Whores and Evil Bitches	(voice)	
1991	Until the End of the World	Lydia	
1999	Harry's War	Maude Green	Short film
2012	The Sapphires	Geraldine	

=== Television ===
Year	Title	Role	Notes
1986	The Flying Doctors	Sharon Herbert	22 episodes
1986	Prisoner	Sarah West	11 episodes
1988	The Gerry Connolly	Parliament House Protester	Episode: "Episode #1.5"
1989	Naked Under Capricorn	Casey	Miniseries
1990	Rafferty's Rules	Rosie Johnson	Episode: "In Custody"
1992	Bligh	10RA	Episode: "The First Treaty"
1996	The Genie from Down Under	Trish Emu	8 episodes
1997–98	Li'l Elvis and the Truckstoppers	Lionel Dexter, Lilian Dexter (voices)	26 episodes
2013	Redfern Now	Patricia	Episode: "Consequences"
