= Alexis Wright =

Australian writer (born 1950)

Alexis Wright FAHA
- Born: 25 November 1950 (age 75); Cloncurry, Queensland, Australia
- Education: RMIT University
- Occupations: Author, novelist
- Writing career
- Period: 1997–present
- Genres: Fiction, non-fiction
- Notable works: Carpentaria, Tracker, Praiseworthy
- Notable awards: Miles Franklin Award, 2007, 2024; Stella Prize, 2018, 2024

Alexis Wright FAHA (born 25 November 1950) is an Australian writer. She is best known for winning the Miles Franklin Award for her 2006 novel Carpentaria and 2024 novel Praiseworthy. She was the first writer to win the Stella Prize twice, in 2018 for her "collective memoir" of Leigh Bruce "Tracker" Tilmouth and in 2024 for Praiseworthy. She was the first person to win the Stella Prize and Miles Franklin Award in the same year.

Wright has published four novels, one biography, and several works of nonfiction. Her work also appears in anthologies and journals.

== Early life and education ==
Alexis Wright was born on 25 November 1950 in Cloncurry, Queensland, Australia. She is an Aboriginal Australian woman of the Waanyi nation in the highlands of the southern Gulf of Carpentaria. Her father, a white cattleman, died when she was five years old. She grew up in Cloncurry with her mother and grandmother.

== Activism ==
Wright has been a land rights activist.

When the Northern Territory Intervention proposed by the Howard Government in mid-2007 was introduced, Wright delivered a high-profile 10,000-word speech, sponsored by International PEN.

== Literary career ==
Wright's first book was the novel Plains of Promise, published in 1997. She is also the author of non-fiction works. Take Power, on the history of the land rights movement, was published in 1998, and Grog War (Magabala Books) on the introduction of alcohol restrictions in Tennant Creek, published in 1997.

Her second novel, Carpentaria, took two years to conceive and more than six years to write. It was rejected by every major publisher in Australia before independent publisher Giramondo published it in 2006. It went on to win several major prizes and excerpts of it, alongside, Plains of Promise, are included in the Anthology of Aboriginal Literature (2008).

In 2013 Wright's third novel, The Swan Book, was published. The book delves into the cultural and racial political challenges facing Australia's Indigenous peoples.

Wright's book, Tracker, her tribute to the central Australian activist Tracker Tilmouth, was published by Giramondo in 2017. A biographical work variously characterised as unconventional and complicated, In the words of Ben Etherington: "It is a work, epic in scope and size, that will ensure that a legend of Central Australian politics is preserved in myth."

== Collaborations, media, and other activities ==
In 2009, Wright wrote the words for Dirtsong, a musical theatre production created and performed by the Black Arm Band theatre company. The performance included both contemporary and traditional songs, and had its world premiere at the 2009 Melbourne International Arts Festival. The show was reprised for the 2014 Adelaide Festival, with performers including Trevor Jamieson, Archie Roach, Lou Bennett, Emma Donovan, Paul Dempsey, and many other singers and musicians. Some of the songs were sung in Aboriginal languages. Wright was a 2012 attendee of the Byron Bay Writers Festival and Singapore Writers Festival.

Wright was on the program for four events at the 2017 Brisbane Writers Festival in Brisbane, Queensland, Australia.

In 2018, Wright conducted another storytelling collaboration, this time with the Gangalidda leader and activist Clarence Walden in Doomadgee, Northern Queensland. Her work with Walden led to two feature documentaries, Nothing but the Truth, a radio feature that broadcast on the Awaye! program on ABC Radio National in June 2019, and Straight from the Heart, a screen documentary that premiered at World Literature and the Global South in August 2019.

== Recognition and awards ==
Plains of Promise (1997), was nominated for several literary awards.

Carpentaria won the Miles Franklin Award in June 2007, the 2007 Fiction Book Award in the Queensland Premier's Literary Awards, the 2007 ALS Gold Medal and the 2007 Vance Palmer Prize for Fiction.

The Swan Book was shortlisted for the 2014 Victorian Premier's Literary Award for Indigenous Writing.

In 2014, Wright was appointed an Honorary Fellow of the Australian Academy of the Humanities.

In 2018, Wright was awarded the Stella Prize for Tracker. She was awarded the 2018 Magarey Medal for Biography for Tracker. Tracker also won the 2018 University of Queensland Non-Fiction Book Award at the Queensland Literary Awards. and was shortlisted for the New South Wales Premier's Literary Awards, Douglas Stewart Prize for Non-Fiction 2019. Published in the UK by And Other Stories, Tracker went on to be longlisted in February 2025 for the Women's Prize for Non-Fiction.

Wright won her second Stella Prize in 2024 for Praiseworthy. Praiseworthy also won her the Miles Franklin Award in 2024, making her the first person to win the Stella Prize and Miles Franklin Award in the same year. She won the Fiction Book Award and was shortlisted for the Queensland Premier's Award for a Work of State Significance at the 2023 Queensland Literary Awards for Praiseworthy. Praiseworthy won the 2023 James Tait Black Prize and the 2024 Stella Prize. She also won the 2026 Kate Challis RAKA Award. It was shortlisted for the 2024 International Dublin Literary Award and won the 2024 ALS Gold Medal. This was Wright's third ALS Gold Medal. She is the third author to have achieved this, after Patrick White and David Malouf.

She received the Creative Australia Award for Lifetime Achievement in Literature in 2023 and was awarded the Melbourne Prize for Literature in 2024.

== Academic career ==
Wright is a Distinguished Research Fellow at Western Sydney University.

She is a member of the Australian Research Council research project "Other Worlds: Forms of World Literature". Building on her success with Tracker, her theme for the project focuses on forms of Aboriginal oral storytelling.

In 2017, Wright was named the Boisbouvier Chair in Australian Literature at the University of Melbourne.

== Works ==
=== Novels ===
- —— (1997). Plains of Promise. Brisbane: University of Queensland Press. ISBN 9780702229176.
- —— (2006). Carpentaria. Sydney: Giramondo. ISBN 9781920882174.
- —— (2013). The Swan Book. Sydney: Giramondo. ISBN 9781922146410.
- —— (2023). Praiseworthy. Sydney: Giramondo. ISBN 9781922725325.

=== Short stories ===
- "Le Pacte du serpent arc-en-ciel". [The Rainbow Serpent's Covenant] (trans. Marc de Gouvenain and Sylvie Kande; Acte Sud, 2002). ISBN 978-2742740956

=== Non-fiction ===
- Grog War (Magabala, 1997). ISBN 1-875641-31-9. Review
- Croire en l'incroyable. [Believing the Unbelievable] (trans. Sabine Porte, Marc de Gouvenain and Sylvie Kande; Actes Sud, 2000). ISBN 978-2742731206
- Tracker (Sydney: Giramondo, 2017). ISBN 978-1925336337. (UK: And Other Stories, January 2025; ISBN 9781916751125)

=== Edited works ===
- Take Power, Like This Old Man Here: An anthology of writings celebrating twenty years of land rights in Central Australia, 1977–1997 (IAD, 1998). ISBN 1-86465-005-2
