= Kate Challis RAKA Award =

- Description: Award recognising Indigenous Australian creative artists
- Country: Australia
- Presented by: University of Melbourne

The Kate Challis RAKA Award is an arts award worth A$25,000, awarded annually since 1991 by the University of Melbourne in Victoria, Australia to Indigenous Australian creative artists. It is awarded in a five-year cycle, each year in a different area of the arts: creative prose, drama, the visual arts, script-writing (screenplay or for theatre) and poetry.

Professor Emeritus Bernard SmithArt and cultural historian established the award in honour of his late wife, Kate Challis, formerly known as Ruth Adeney. "RAKA" is an acronym for "Ruth Adeney Koori Award". In the Pintupi language, "raka" means "five", and in Warlpiri, "rdaka" means "hand".

It has been awarded since 1991.

== Past winners ==
- 1991: Bill Dodd for his novel Broken Dreams
- 1992: Jack Davis for his play No Sugar
- 1993: Lin Onus for his sculpture
- 1994: Tracey Moffat for her film beDevil
- 1995: Kevin Gilbert for his collection of poetry, Black from the Edge
- 1996: Mudrooroo for his novel Us Mob
- 1997: John Harding for his play Up the Road
- 1998: Brook Andrew for his photographic work, Sexy and Dangerous
- 1999: Rima Tamou for the film script Round Up
- 2000: Samuel Wagan Watson for his volume Night Song and Other Poems
- 2001: Kim Scott for his novel Benang: From the Heart
- 2002: Jane Harrison for her play Stolen and Dallas Winmar for her play Aliwa!
- 2003: Ricky Maynard for his photographic work Wik Elder, Arthur
- 2004: Ivan Sen for his film script Beneath the Clouds
- 2005: Mr Brown and Geytenbeek for their book Ngarla Songs
- 2006: Vivienne Cleven, jointly awarded for creative prose in two novels: Bitin’ Back (2001) and Her Sister’s Eye (2002)
- 2007: David Milroy for his play Windmill Baby
- 2008: Gali Yalkarriwuy for his work, Banumbirr (Morning Star Pole)
- 2009: Warwick Thornton for his screenplay Samson and Delilah
- 2010: Yvette Holt for her poetry collection Anonymous Premonition (2008)
- 2011: Kim Scott for his novel That Deadman Dance
- 2012: Dallas Winmar for her play Yibiyung
- 2013: Mabel Juli for the painting Garnkeny Ngarranggarni (2010)
- 2014: Ivan Sen for the film script for Toomelah (2011)
- 2015: Lionel Fogarty for his volume of poems Mogwie-idan: Stories of the Land (2012)
- 2016: Alexis Wright for her novel The Swan Book (2013)
- 2017: Jub Clerc for the playThe Fever and The Fret
- 2018: Yhonnie Scarce for her artwork of blown glass, Remember Royalty
- 2019: Steven McGregor and David Tranter for the screenplay of Sweet Country
- 2020: Natalie Harkin for the poetry collection Archival-Poetics (2020)
- 2021: Tara June Winch for her novel The Yield
- 2022: Dylan Van Den Berg for his play Milk
- 2023: Brian Robinson for his painting Uncharted: Astrolabe and Zelee in Kulkalgal country
- 2024: Ivan Sen for his script for his feature film Limbo
- 2025: Jazz Money for poetry mark the dawn
- 2026: Alexis Wright for Praiseworthy
