= Australian Literary Review =

Australian defunct monthly newspaper literary supplement

The Australian Literary Review (ALR) was a monthly supplement to The Australian newspaper established in September 2006 and published on the first Wednesday of each month. The headquarters was in Surry Hills, Sydney. It was considered to be a continuation of The Australian's Review of Books, which was a supplement published between 1996 and 2001. The magazine's editors-in-chief included Stephen Matchett, Stephen Romei, and Luke Slattery. Like its predecessor, it was supported by the Australia Council for the Arts. The last issue was published in October 2011.
