= Nene Gare =

Author of 'The Fringe Dwellers' (1919–1994)

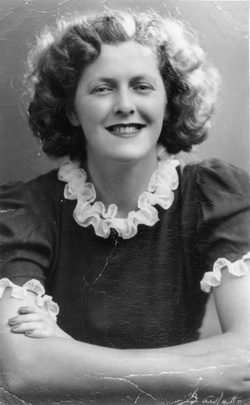
- Nene Gere ca. 1940, aged 20/21
- Born: Doris Violet May Wadham; 9 May 1919; Adelaide, South Australia, Australia
- Died: 29 May 1994 (aged 75); Shelley, Western Australia, Australia
- Occupations: Novelist, artist and political activist
- Spouse: Frank Ellis Gare
- Children: Arran (1942–47), Lief Frances (b 1945), Arran (b 1948), Helen Shelley (b 1952)

Nene Gare (9 May 1919 – 29 May 1994) was an Australian writer and artist, best known as the author of the novel The Fringe Dwellers (1961), which was made into the 1986 Australian film of the same name directed by Bruce Beresford.

== Personal life ==
Gare was born Doris Violet May Wadham in 1919 in Adelaide, South Australia. Her parents John Henry Wadham, a saddler and harness maker, and Mary Hounslow Wadham, were strict Methodists. Gare attended Adelaide School of Art and then Perth Technical College, returning to Adelaide to work as a typist from 1938 to 1939.

In 1941, she married Perth-based public servant Frank Ellis Gare, who then left to serve on the Queen Mary during World War II.

Nene and Frank Gare had four children, Arran (1942–47), Leif Frances (b 1945), Arran Gare (b 1948) and Helen Shelley Gare (b 1952).

From 1946 to 1948, the family moved to Papua New Guinea, where Frank worked as a patrol officer on Duke of York Island, at Salamaua and Mumeng. Many of her experiences in PNG formed the basis of the novel "An Island Away".

In 1947, at the age of four, her oldest son Arran died of malaria, while her two-year-old daughter Leif survived the disease. The family returned to Perth, where Frank worked as a clerk.

The couple's third child was born in 1948 and named Arran in honour of the son they had lost. Nene suffered a persistent cough so the family moved to Carnarvon in the northwest of Western Australia, where they managed a banana plantation and where their fourth child, daughter Helen, was born. Gare's novel "Green Gold" is based on this period.

In 1952–54, Frank was appointed District Officer with the Native Welfare Department in Carnarvon and was transferred to the position of District Officer for the Murchison Region, with the family based in Geraldton.

Using modest government funding, Frank Gare was charged with meeting basic needs (ablutions, water, shelter and power) in Aboriginal reserves throughout the area.

Nene and the children often stayed at a semi-rural property at Drummond Cove. Nene came to know several Aboriginal families living in a camp known as the Snake Pit, a collection of tin and hessian shacks with dirt floors and no running water or electricity, just outside Geraldton, with these friendships later inspiring The Fringe Dwellers.

Gare later said that she was influenced by the relative penury of her own parents in comparison to her extended family of wealthier aunts and uncles. Her books "A House with Verandahs" and "Kent Town" draw on this period. Gare told editor Christobel Mattingley that because she felt second-class, and was affected by family hardships during the Depression, she had empathy for the Aboriginal people in Western Australia, on whom her most famous novel was based.

Gare was quoted by Christobel Mattingley as explaining, "I have always written about my own experiences. I write as I feel. I have been too afraid to write from my imagination in case I mislead. My own reading when I was very young caused me to expect so much more from life than one ever gets. So I distrust most fiction. I'd never never contrive to make a plot. Things must happen, as I think they do. No working up to a climax - possibly unfortunately for my publishers".

== Art ==
Gare was a talented artist and held five exhibitions in Perth. She won prizes in the Canning Art Awards for 1971, 1972, 1976 and 1978. She donated most of the proceeds from her art to charities, including Amnesty International, WA AIDS Council, the local dogs' home and a woman lawyer assisting Aboriginal women and children.

== Works ==
- Jimmy's Orders (3 October 1943) Perth, WA: Sunday Times, p. 3
- In Possession (13 July 1944) Perth, WA: Western Mail, p. 20
- You Belong to Me (21 June 1945) Perth, WA: Western Mail, p. 20
- Engine Trouble (8 November 1945) The Adelaide Chronicle, p. 13
- Confusion Reigned (7 March 1946) Perth, WA: Western Mail, p. 28
- Honesty and Policy (18 April 1946) Perth, WA: Western Mail, p. 86
- Pigging It (2 May 1946) The Adelaide Chronicle, p. 13
- Letters from a Patrol Officer's Wife (15 August 1946) Perth, WA: Western Mail, p. 15
- Peace At A Price (22 August 1946) The Adelaide Chronicle, p. 13
- Surprise (19 September 1946) Perth, WA: Western Mail, p. 14
- Getting Things Done (3 October 1946) Perth, WA: Western Mail, p. 14
- An Odd Job (5 June 1947) The Adelaide Chronicle, p. 33
- Simple Precautions (19 August 1948) Perth, WA: Western Mail, p. 12
- A Night in New Guinea (17 March 1949) The Adelaide Chronicle, p. 17
- Growing Eggs in the Islands (25 August 1949) The Adelaide Chronicle, p. 31
- New House (1 September 1949) Perth, WA: Western Mail, p. 16
- Fine Feathers (3 November 1949) Perth, WA: Western Mail, p. 8
- Michael's Stupendous Bargain (15 December 1949) Perth, WA: Western Mail, p. 16
- Calf Love (29 December 1949) The Adelaide Chronicle, p. 14
- Antique Vase (19 January 1950) Perth, WA: Western Mail, p. 16
- Give Me The Chance (29 December 1949) The Adelaide Chronicle, p. 23
- Family Outing (27 April 1950) Perth, WA: Western Mail, p. 16
- No Party for Michael (29 June 1950) Perth, WA: Western Mail, p. 16
- Test Case (20 July 1950) Perth, WA: Western Mail, p. 18
- Coming Along Nicely (12 October 1950) Perth, WA: Western Mail, p. 16
- Wanted Tall Man (12 October 1950) The Adelaide Chronicle, p. 32
- The Fringe Dwellers (1961) Melbourne: Sun Books
- Green Gold (1963) London : Heinemann
- Welfare Worker (17 April 1976) The Canberra Times, p. 9
- Christmas Dinner (24 December 1977) The Canberra Times, p. 7
- Bend to the Wind (short stories)(1978) Melbourne: Macmillan
- A House with Verandahs (1980) Melbourne : Macmillan
- An Island Away (1981) London : Heinemann
- Kent Town: A 1920s girlhood (1997) Kent Town, SA : Wakefield Press
- First Weeks in Perth, not published
- Kate Kempter, not published
