= Yaama Ngunna Baaka =

Yaama Ngunna Baaka 2019 was a corroboree festival conceived by Bruce Shillingsworth, with a vision of initiating dialog with Elders.

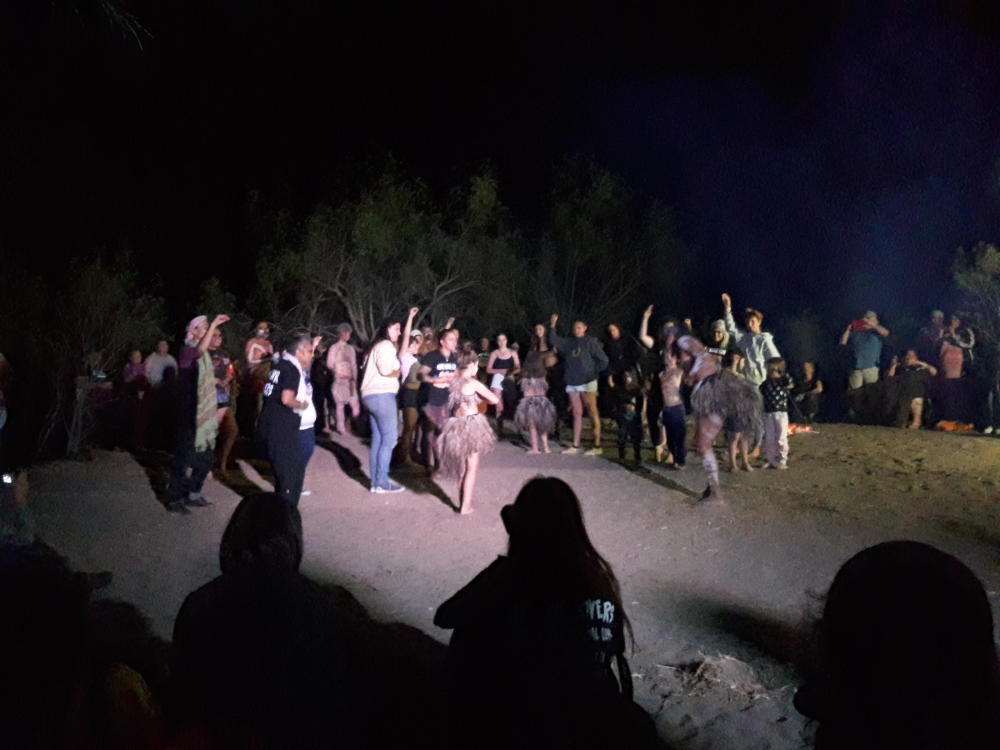
Corroboree Walgett

The festival comprised a series of corroborees by the rivers in Walgett, Brewarrina, Bourke, Wilcannia and Menindee. About twelve dance groups participated, and many travelled with them in convoy to each of the corroborees.

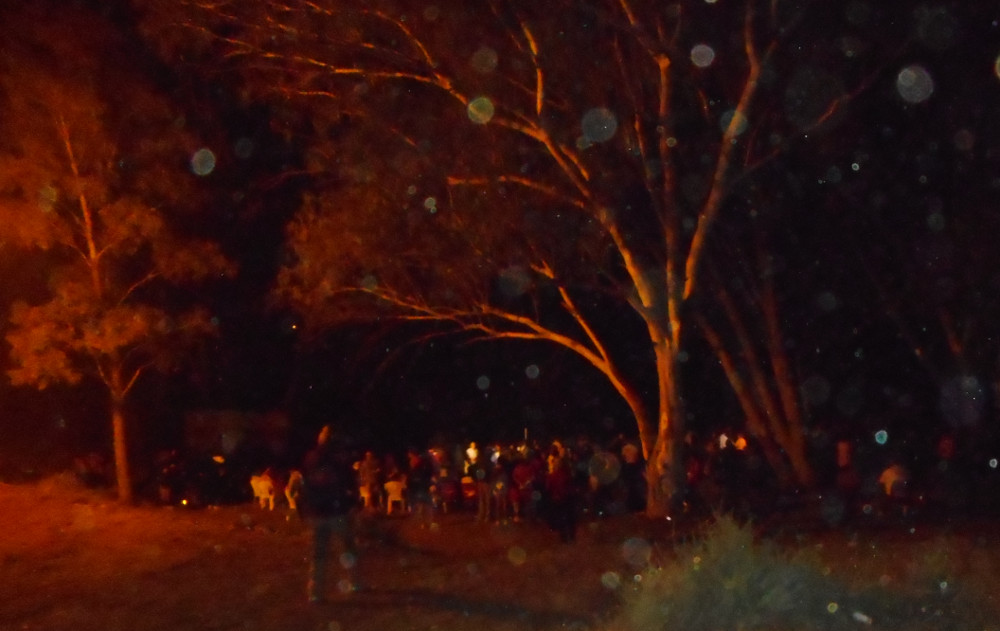
Corroboree by the River in Wilcania

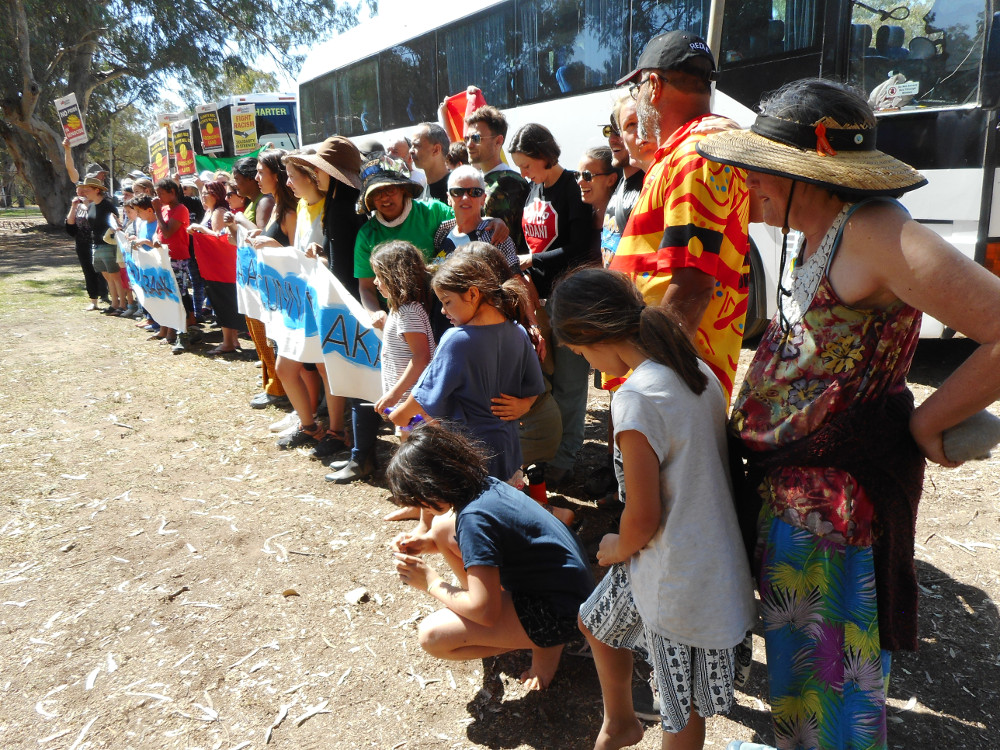
Wilcannia, Campground

The corroboree at Wilcania was hosted by the Barkindji. The Barkindji fear their culture, which relates closely to the river, is being destroyed.

The Tal-Kin-Jeri Dance in Australia Group came from Adelaide and performed at the closing night near Menindee.
