= The Dreamers (play) =

1982 play by Jack Davis

The Dreamers is a play written by Jack Davis, set in Western Australia. He wrote the play to influence public opinion and bring about improvement in Aboriginal Australians' lives.

== Characters ==
The play features the following characters:

- Worru - an old Aboriginal man
- Dolly - Worru's niece
- Meena - Dolly's daughter(age 14)
- Shane - Dolly's son(age 12)
- Roy - Dolly's husband
- Eli - a cousin
- Peter - Dolly's son (age 18)
- Darren - a white boy, (age 12 approx.)
- Robert - Dolly’s Nephew

== Plot ==
The play is about how Aboriginal family, the Wallitches, go through everyday life. The story takes place over a period of six months in the home of the family.

The play maintains an elegiac tone throughout for a tribal past, for a people one physically and spiritually in harmony with their world.

== Performances ==
It was first performed on 2 February 1982 by the Swan River Stage Company at the Dolphin Theatre in Perth. Although first performed in 1982, the play is contemporary and can be understood in a current context. The play continues to be restaged by a range of companies, particularly companies with an indigenous focus.
