= Carpentaria (novel) =

2006 novel by Alexis Wright

- First edition cover
- Author: Alexis Wright
- Cover artist: Russell White
- Language: English
- Genre: Fiction
- Publisher: Giramondo Publishing
- Publication date: 2006
- Publication place: Australia
- Media type: Print (paperback)
- Pages: 519 pp
- ISBN: 978-1-920882-17-4
- OCLC: 85863382
- Dewey Decimal: 823/.914 22
- LC Class: PR9619.3.W67 C37 2006

Carpentaria is the second novel by the Indigenous Australian author Alexis Wright. It met with widespread critical acclaim when it was published in mid-2006, and went on to win Australia's premier literary prize, the Miles Franklin Award, in mid-2007.

== Plot introduction ==
The novel tells the interconnected stories of several inhabitants of the fictional town of Desperance, situated on the Gulf of Carpentaria in northwest Queensland. There, the Aboriginal people of the Pricklebush clan are engaged in a number of argumentative conflicts with various enemies in the community, including the white inhabitants of Desperance, the local law enforcement and government officials, and a large multinational mining operation that has been established on their traditional sacred land. The narrative chronicles the interpersonal relationships shared between three men embroiled in these disputes: the wise, pragmatic, and blunt Normal Phantom; the nomadic, overzealous shamanic practitioner of Aboriginal traditional religion, Mozzie Fishman; and Norm's son, Will Phantom, who deserted his father's house to undertake a cross-country spiritual journey with Fishman, but who has now returned home with something of Fishman's character in him.

== Publication ==
At the time of publication the Australian bookstore chain Angus & Robertson decided to stock books produced by small presses only if the publishers themselves paid a requisite fee. The implication of this decision was that such publishers would be unable to afford these fees, and therefore their publications would be removed from the shelves to make room for books that were likely to achieve higher sales. Carpentaria, after having been rejected by every major Australian publisher, was eventually published by Giramondo, one of the publishing houses targeted in Angus & Robertson's campaign; therefore the most recent winner of Australia's largest literary prize would no longer be stocked in one of Australia's largest bookstore chains. This too received considerable media attention, and again boosted sales of the novel.

== Reviews ==
- Dunsford, Cathie (7 March 2007). "Carpentaria by Alexis Wright, reviewed by Dr Cathie Dunsford". Asia and Pacific Writers Network.
- Ferrier, Carole (n.d.) "The Best Australian Novel for Years ...". Australian Women's Book Review.
- Davison, Liam (18 September 2006). "Carpentaria". The Sydney Morning Herald.
- Fitzgerald, Michael (25 September 2006). "Crossing the Gulf". Time.

== Awards ==
- 2007 Miles Franklin Award, winner
- 2007 ALS Gold Medal, winner
- 2007 Queensland Premier's Literary Awards – Prize for Fiction, winner
- 2007 Victorian Premier's Prize for Fiction, winner
