= The Fringe Dwellers (novel) =

1961 Australian novel by Nene Gare

- Author: Nene Gare
- Language: English
- Publisher: Heinemann
- Publication date: 1961
- Publication place: Australia
- Pages: 295pp
- Preceded by: –
- Followed by: Green Gold

The Fringe Dwellers is a 1961 novel written by the Western Australian author Nene Gare. It was made into a 1986 film of the same name directed by Bruce Beresford.
