= Jack Davis (playwright) =

Indigenous Australian playwright (1917–2000)

Jack Leonard Davis
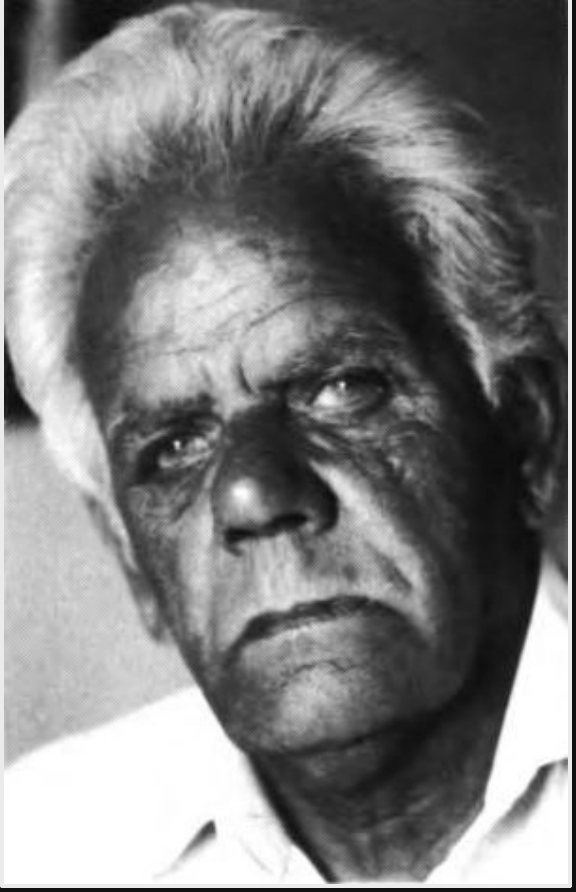
- Jack Davis
- Born: 11 March 1917; Perth, Western Australia, Australia
- Died: 17 March 2000 (aged 83); Perth, Western Australia, Australia
- Education: High school
- Occupations: Playwright and Poet
- Known for: Poetry, acting, writing, Aboriginal rights activism
- Notable work: No Sugar
- Awards: Order of the British Empire Order of Australia

Jack Leonard Davis (11 March 1917 – 17 March 2000) was an Australian 20th-century Aboriginal playwright, poet and Aboriginal Australian activist.

His work incorporates themes of Aboriginality and their identity. It also includes many Aboriginal traditions and cultural practises.

While known for his literary work, Davis did not focus on writing until his fifties. His writing centred around the Aboriginal experience in relation to the settlement of white Australians. His collection of poems The First Born (1970) was his first work to be published, and made him the first Aboriginal Australian man and second Aboriginal person to have published poetry. He later focused his writing on plays, starting with Kullark, which was first performed in 1979. His plays were recognised internationally and were performed in Canada and England.

== Early life and education ==
Jack Leonard Davis was born in Perth, Western Australia, where he spent most of his life and later died. He identified with the Noongar people, and he included some of this language into his plays.

The first five years of Davis' life were spent on a farm in Waroona, Western Australia with his ten siblings. His family then moved to Yarloop in 1923 after a bushfire destroyed their farm. Davis and his family were members of the Bibbulmun and Nyoongar people and spoke the Nyoongar language.

His mother, Alice McPhee, and father, William Davis, also known as "Bill", were both taken from their parents as they were considered by the government to be "half-castes". Under the Australian policy passed in 1890, children who had both a full-blood Aboriginal parent and a non-Aboriginal parent were considered half-castes, a policy which resulted in the Stolen Generations. His parents went to work for white families and never acquired an education, making them illiterate. His mother was seven years old when she went to work for the Stretch family as a servant in Broome, Western Australia. His mother recalls that while they treated her well, she never felt part of the family. Her employers never educated his mother with their other children and she would be left to do domestic house work as they went to school. His father was eight years old when he went off to work, and took the surname of his boss "Davis" because he did not like his father's last name "Sung" who was a Sikh man. Jack Davis' father and mother met in Northam, Western Australia and were married soon after. During their marriage, they had six daughters and five sons.

William Davis worked mostly in the timber industry as a log chopper and found it hard to support eleven children on his income. However, his love of hunting and the bush allowed him to still provide meat for the family. He died in 1933 after making his way home from a hunting accident. He was walking through a paddock in the early evening and was attacked by a bull. This left the family with no income, leading to the family selling up and moving out of Yarloop, a less remote area.

Jack Davis attended school in Yarloop with his ten brothers and sisters. As a result of Davis' father having Australian citizenship status, his children were allowed to get the same education as children with European heritage. His father's citizenship status also meant his children were not forced to go to an Aboriginal settlement.

In early 1932, at age fourteen, Jack Davis and his brother Harold were offered work under false pretences at Moore River Native Settlement from the Protector of Aborigines, A. O. Neville. While his father was concerned about sending his sons to an Aboriginal settlement, the Great Depression put a financial strain on their family and work was scarce. At the Moore River Native Settlement, Aboriginal people were to learn skills that would enable them to integrate better into white society.

The two boys were to work on the farm in exchange for labour and farm skills, however, this turned out to be an empty promise that they discovered once they arrived. The settlement segregated white Australians and Aboriginal people and prohibited the Aboriginal people speaking their native languages. Davis and his brother were among 400 Aboriginal people that were "offered" work at the Moore River Native Settlement considered as a social measure by the government. While some Aboriginal people were forced to work, this was not the case for Jack Davis and his brother. After nine months, the two boys left to go back to Yarloop. Davis' experience on the Moore River Native Settlement later shaped his literary work.

After Jack Davis and his brother Harold returned home to Yarloop after working at Moore River, Harold went to fight in World War II.

== Career ==
Davis pursued many labour-intensive jobs before he committed to writing. This included being a stockman, a horse trainer, a drover, a mill worker, a driver in various methods of transportation and a kangaroo hunter. In 1970, at the time of publishing his first collection of poems The First Born, he dedicated himself to literature. The First Born made him the first Aboriginal Australian man and second Aboriginal person to have published poetry at that time (Oodgeroo Noonuccal had been published earlier).

He became the manager of the Aboriginal Advancement Council Centre in Perth from 1969 to 1973. He then transitioned into becoming an editor at the Aboriginal Publications Foundation from 1973 to 1979, which published a magazine called Identity that focused on recognising Aboriginal literature.

In 1983 Davis co-founded, with Colin Thomas Johnson, aka Mudrooroo, the National Aboriginal and Islander Writers, Oral Literature, and Dramatists Association (NAIWOLDA). One of the organisation's priorities was to establish an independent national Black Australian publishing house.

== Works ==
Jack Davis began his writing career by publishing a collection of poems called The First Born in 1970. He later published his second collection of poetry called Jagardoo in 1977, which was illustrated by Harold Thomas (who also designed the Aboriginal Australian flag).

After this he began to focus on playwriting, publishing a total of five plays and two children's plays:

Plays:

- Kullark, 1979
- The Dreamers, 1981
- No Sugar, 1985
- Barungin, 1989
- In Our Town, 1990

Children's plays:

- Honey Spot, 1987
- Moorli and the Leprechaun, 1994

Davis also wrote a monodrama called Wahngin Country, but he never finished it. Academic Bob Hodge, who wrote the peer-reviewed journal Jack Davis and the Emergence of Aboriginal Writing in 1994 stated Davis was interested in "White History" and how it omitted the Aboriginal history and their perspective.

According to academics, Davis wanted to offer an alternative narrative that included the Aboriginal story. Davis found the most effective format was through transforming the Indigenous tradition of oral storytelling into written plays and performance. Themes in his work encapsulate the history and discrimination of Aboriginal people, including the first contact with white settlers. Academic Adam Shoemaker has described his work as always alluding to the history of Aboriginal people even when his plays are not mentioning the past.

=== Kullark ===
Davis' play Kullark, translated to "home" is often considered by academics as a documentary, detailing the beginning of white settlement in Western Australia in 1829.

Kullark, published in 1979 translates to "home" in the Nyoongar language. The meaning of the play is interpreted by academics as a protest, criticising the colonial recorded history of the 1829 white settlement in Western Australia.

The play documents the history and first contact between Aboriginal people and white settlers from the author's perspective, using an Aboriginal family that have been affected by the history Davis is attempting to divulge. Davis uses a chronological and documentary like structure to present the play. He includes details such as the white settlers trading poisoned white flour and the massacres at Pinjarra in 1834. Academics have inferred that Davis includes the details of these events to give Aboriginal people a voice and a known history that have been previously omitted. Kullark was Davis' first play to begin that journey of historical story telling

=== The Dreamers ===
The Dreamers was first performed in 1972 and published in 1981. The play centres its narrative around the memory of three Aboriginal men who worked at Moore River Native Settlement. Davis wrote that he aimed to confront white and black audiences with a truthful and uncompromising picture of urban Aboriginal life.

=== No Sugar ===
Davis' play No Sugar was first published in 1986 and achieved great acclaim; receiving the Australian writers Guild Award (AWGIE) for best stage play, the year it was published. The play was set in the 1930s during the Great Depression and tells the story of an Aboriginal family that is removed from their home and forced to work on the Moore River Native Settlement. An article by The Sydney Morning Herald writes that the play is a rejection of white assimilation and the degradation of Aboriginal lives and culture. The Play includes many references of the Nyoongah language. Academics such as Bob Hodge consider this an attempt to validate the importance of Aboriginal culture, while also communicating the feelings of isolation when people cannot understand their own language and cultural customs.

A production of the play directed by Bob Maza was performed at the Black Theatre Arts and Culture Centre in Redfern in 1994.

No Sugar is currently in the Victorian High School Syllabus for students who are in the English as an Additional Language (EAL) course for the Higher School Certificate (HSC). However, as mentioned in The Sydney Morning Herald, there is debate over whether the themes and inclusion of the Nyoongah language are too complex for students who are trying to learn the fundamentals of the English.

=== Barungin ===
Davis' play Barungin was published in 1989 and translates to "Smell the Wind" in the Nyoongah language. The play focuses on the high incarceration rate of Aboriginal people and the large number of deaths of Aboriginal in custody. During the year the play was published, Aboriginal Australians accounted to ten percent of the national average of people in jail. The play is set in Western Australia, where the incarceration rate of Aboriginal people was 35%.

== Recognition and awards ==
Davis' work and contributions were recognised by the Order of the British Empire (BEM) in 1976, the Order of Australia Award in 1985 and two honorary doctorates from the University of Western Australia and Murdoch University.

In 1980, he received the FAW Patricia Weickhardt Award to an Aboriginal Writer.

Academic Adam Shoemaker, who has covered much of Davis' work and Aboriginal Australian literature, has said that he was one of "Australia's most influential Aboriginal authors".

His plays were recognised internationally and were performed in Canada and England.

His work has been included in many Australian school syllabuses for children to read and discuss.

== Themes and analysis ==
=== Aboriginality and Aboriginalism ===
Academics refer to the concepts Aboriginality and Aboriginalism when analysing Davis' work. According to academics, Davis's work encapsulates these themes by constructing Western thought in his work and using the Nyoongah native language as a form of Aboriginal empowerment.

Academic Bob Hodge states that Aboriginalism is much like Orientalism, where White society sees those of different race and culture as 'the other'. The concept is portrayed as white society needing to fix those cultural differences, which is referenced in Davis' plays. Academics have said that Davis and other Aboriginal writers such as Oodgeroo Noonuccal from the sixties and seventies used literature as a form of activism against these ideals and as a powerful form of communication to write their own history.

Academics have analysed Davis' work through the lens of Aboriginality as he uses the Western form of communication to connect to a white audience. Plays are seen as a Western form of communication, as Aboriginal history has revealed that Indigenous Australians told stories through oral communication, more commonly known as Dreamtime. By including these Aboriginal overtones, academics believe he is trying to show a white audience another form of history through a communication method they know. Kullark, Davis' first play in 1979 is used as an example by academics to show that Davis is confronting the issue of Aboriginalism. Davis provides a historical and chronological account in Kullark including Aboriginal people where they previously were not. According to academics, Davis believed that white historians were unwilling to write the Aboriginal history and this, he felt, was necessary to record Aboriginal history in the Western way. His purpose for writing was for people to know Aboriginal people were omitted from white history, and to then provide the Aboriginal account. His goal, however, was for future generations to reflect and read history which included both Aboriginal and non-Aboriginal people. Aboriginality encompasses the response and reaction of Indigenous writers in reclaiming their culture and history. It is seen as a protest against white imperialism and assimilation policies that dominated the beginning of white settlement in Australia. The concept of "Aboriginality" within literature also includes proposals of how both white and Indigenous people can move forward. This concept was introduced in the 1960s when Aboriginal literature was first published, proposing a new way forward.

=== Survival ===
According to academics the theme of survival is recurring in Davis' work as it refers to the first settlement of white people and the long battle Aboriginal people have had to fight for their existence, land, culture, history and rights. Academics reveal the empowerment that Aboriginal people feel when they see themselves on the stage acting in Davis's plays, symbolising their ability to reclaim their sense of worth

=== Influence ===
Davis' life and history was a driving force and influence on his literary work. Davis's experience on Moore River Native Settlement has shaped both his play Kullark, No Sugar and The Dreamers. In Davis' play No Sugar he recreates the experience using different characters and detailing the large quantity of Aboriginal people taken to Moore River Native Settlement. Similarly, the Western Australian Aboriginal Protector A.O Neville, who sent Davis and his brother to the Moore River Native Settlement, features in his plays Kullark, No Sugar and The Dreamers. Davis uses Neville's speeches in his plays to portray the government's perspective on Aboriginal people. According to academics, Davis tries to demonstrate how the government believed they were doing the right thing for Aboriginal people but neglected to see the Aboriginal perspective and the pain and suffering that was the result. They infer that Davis evokes an understanding of the European mindset, yet shows how that attitude also shaped the way Aboriginal people see themselves; his plays were not meant to be a place of conflict or a vent of anger, but a place of clarity, empowerment, and understanding.

His poems were mentioned in the Chinese Hugo Award writer Liu Cixin's novel Death's End, the third volume of the author's Remembrance of Earth's Past trilogy.

His childhood in Yarloop has been featured in his poetry. His poem "Magpie" was influenced by his walk home from school through the jarrah forests and the wild life:

Magpie, Magpie,
Jaunty walk, cheeky eye,
You don't seem to have an enemy,
I don't know why.
Especially you, Mr Male,
With your elegant dress,
And your black and white tail.
I have seen you beat your mate
And make her squark as you berate,
Striding, running over my lawn,
Chattering in the early dawn,
As if you own that too.
On Second thoughts, as far as birds go
And what do they know,
You believe in land rights too!

He wrote another poem about his experience of making his own bow and arrow and killing a robin redbreast which he felt great remorse for.

== List of works ==
=== Plays ===
- Kullark (1972)
- The Dreamers (1982)
- No Sugar (1985)
- Honeyspot (1985)
- Moorli and the Leprechaun (1986)
- Burungin (1988)
- Plays from Black Australia (1989)
- In Our Town (1990)

=== Poetry ===
- The First-born and other poems (1970)
- The Black Tracker (1970)
- Jagardoo : Poems from Aboriginal Australia (1978)
- John Pat and Other Poems (1988) Publisher Dent Australia ISBN 0-86770-079-3
- Black Life : poems (1992)
- Wurru : poem from Aboriginal

=== Other works ===
- Jack Davis : A life-story (1988)
- A Boy's Life (1991)
- Paperbark : A Collection of Black Australian Writings (1992)
