= Yirra Yaakin =

Aboriginal theatre company in Perth, Australia

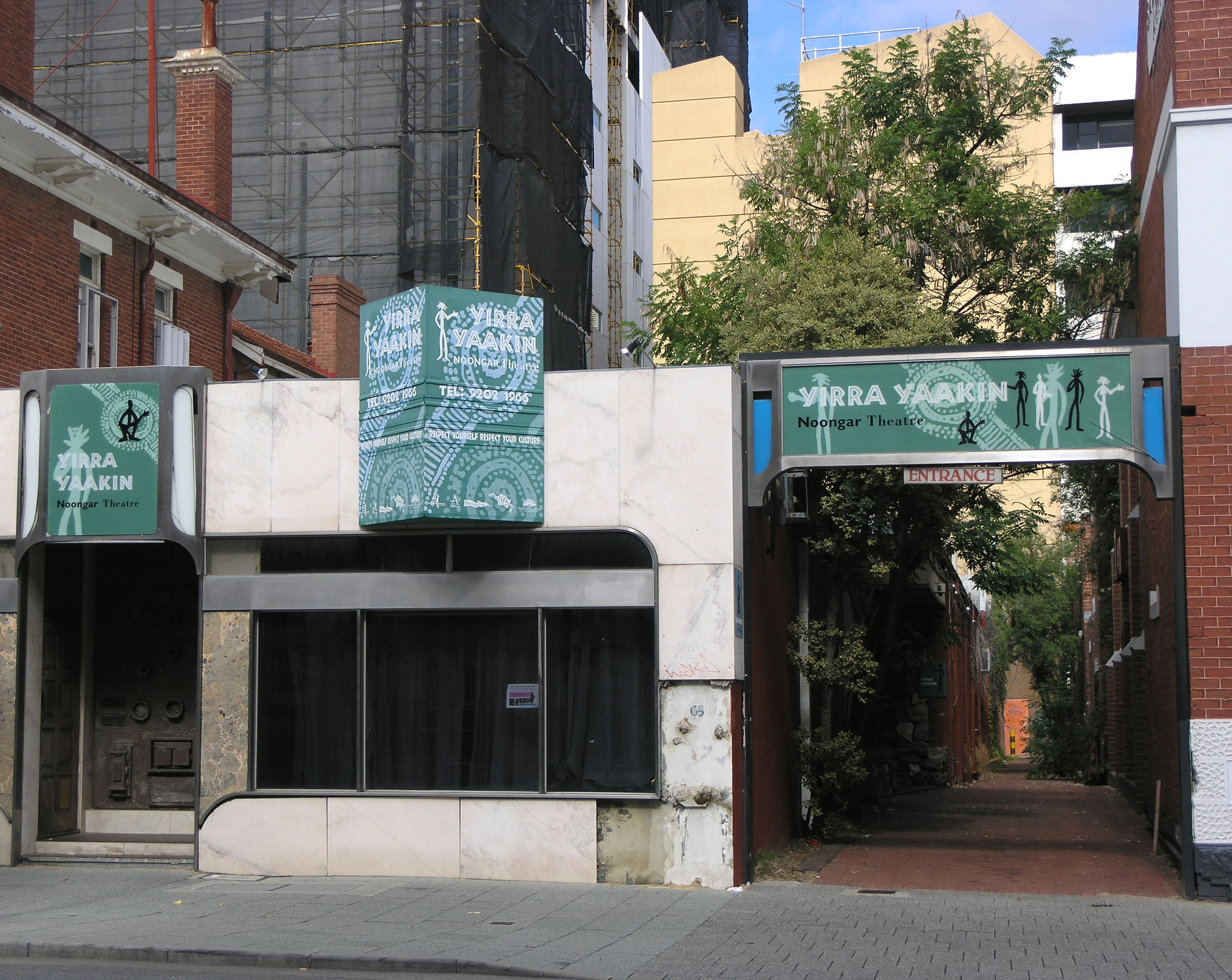
Yirra Yaakin Theatre, 65 Murray Street.

The Yirra Yaakin Theatre Company, also known as Yirra Yaakin Noongar Theatre, is an Aboriginal Australian theatre company, based in Perth, Western Australia in the heart of the Noongar Nation, a cultural group from the South West of Western Australia.

Formed in 1993, Yirra Yaakin provides the means and environment to assist the nurturing of Aboriginal community cultural development.

In 2013, Yirra Yaakin staged Bob Merritt's play The Cake Man for the first time in WA, in a collaboration with the Belvoir.

== See also ==
- Indigenous theatre in Australia
