= Richard Green (Australian actor) =

Aboriginal Australian actor, teacher, and elder

- Born: 1962 or 1963; Katoomba, New South Wales, Australia
- Died: 23 July 2021 (aged 58)
- Occupations: Actor, musician, teacher

Richard Green (1962 or 1963 – 23 July 2021) was an Australian actor, musician, teacher, and Aboriginal elder. He is known for many roles in film and television, in particular as Chris in Boxing Day (2007), as Barry in Snowtown (2011). As a Dharug man, he learnt and taught the Dharug language, an Indigenous language of Sydney, and was regarded as an elder of the Dharug people in his later years, earning the title "Uncle".

== Early life and education ==
Richard Green was born in Katoomba, New South Wales, 1962 or 1963, the eldest of five siblings. When he was five, the family moved to Kingswood "to avoid the authorities". He is a Dharug man, who had white grandparents, who "had a great connection with my people" and taught him about his family history and connections.

Green experienced family violence as a child. He ran away from home aged 13, living on the streets for many years. He was caught stealing and spent time in juvenile detention.

In 1998, Green was in Long Bay Jail in Sydney when he acted in his first film, called Two/Out, directed by Kriv Stenders, who met him in jail a year earlier and found him to be a natural actor. Upon his release, in his twenties, Green started engaging with the arts, both writing and performing.

He also taught others, at the same time studying music, arts, and media, continuing throughout his career. He earned diplomas in contemporary music and in film and television.

== Career ==
Green's career soon took off, and he became known for his roles in both film and television. On the big screen, he appeared in Praise (1998), Jewboy (2005), Little Fish (2005), as Chris in Boxing Day (2007), as Barry in Snowtown (2011), The Last Confession of Alexander Pearce (2008), and The Rover (2014), also starring Guy Pearce.

On television, he had significant roles in both Redfern Now and The Gods of Wheat Street.

He worked on Andrew Bovell's stage adaptation of Kate Grenville's novel, presented under the same title by the Sydney Theatre Company, The Secret River, first in 2013 and later in 2016. Green helped to create real names for the Dharug-speaking characters in the play.

He was working as a dialect coach on a feature-length film about Aboriginal warrior Pemulwuy, working title Pemulwuy: The Movie, written by Jon Bell and directed by Catriona McKenzie. The filmmakers consulted "Uncle Richard Green", along with Uncles Vic Simms and Colin Isaacs, as local community elders. Philip Noyce, as executive producer, travelled from Los Angeles, along with McKenzie, in August 2019 to meet the elders. The film was due to begin production in 2021, not long before Green's death.

== Other activities ==
Green played music, and taught the Dharug language to children in schools and boys' homes in the western suburbs of Sydney.

In 2017, he performed the Welcome to Country for The Preatures at the Sydney Opera House and Lansdowne Hotel. Sydney Opera House also made audio recordings of both a Welcome and Acknowledgment of Country, which they played before a number of performances, including all Vivid Live performances in 2018.

== Recognition ==
Adrian Wills, co-director of The Gods of Wheat Street and Redfern Now, called him "an absolute dream to direct...He was a storyteller, he was a dancer, he was a song man, he was a writer, a poet, a cultural warrior and a leader as well". Fellow Sydney actor and friend Elaine Crombie said "he was one of our finest Australian actors".

For his role in Jewboy, Green was nominated for the Best Actor Award in the Inside Film Awards, as well as winning Best Actor in the Festival du nouveau cinéma in Montreal, Canada.

== Death ==
Green died aged 58 from heart complications on 23 July 2021, at his home.
