= Kelton Pell =

Australian actor

- Born: Western Australia, Australia
- Occupation: Actor

Kelton Pell is an Aboriginal Australian stage, TV, and film actor, best known for his role as the court liaison officer, Sam Wallan, in the SBS legal drama The Circuit.

== Early life ==
Kelton Pell is a Noongar man from Western Australia. He was born to father John Pell. His grandmother was a child of the Stolen Generation whose own mother was incarcerated because she went searching for her.

Pell launched his professional acting career after attending an open audition in the mid-1980s, on the advice of his mother.

== Career ==
Pell has performed on stage since 1985, performing for Yirra Yaakin Theatre, the Black Swan Theatre Company, and the Sydney Theatre Company. Many of these performances were of plays which grew from Indigenous themes.

In 2000 Pell, along with Ningali Lawford and Phil Thomson, wrote a show for Yirra Yaakin called Solid, whose premiere performance was at the Perth International Arts Festival. Because of its sensitive Indigenous subject matter, before the premiere, the play was performed for (and was approved by) 2000 Indigenous Australians.

Pell performed in several productions of Bloodland, a play directed by Stephen Page with a Romeo and Juliet-style story. The play features traditional Aboriginal languages and Pidgin English, as well as song and dance.

He has also acted in performances of Twelfth Night and A Midsummer Night's Dream.

Pell acted in the children's TV show The Adventures of the Bush Patrol and the SBS series The Circuit, a legal drama set in the Kimberley.

In 2012 he starred in an episode of the TV series Redfern Now, as a well-to-do Aboriginal Australian man living in Redfern, Sydney, whose life seems to be exemplary, until it is revealed that he has been receiving government benefit money fraudulently.

Pell plays vampire hunter Jalingbirri in Warwick Thornton's 2021 horror / comedy series Firebite for AMC+ (later shown on NITV).

In 2022, Pell appeared in the ABC drama series Mystery Road: Origin. In 2024, he appeared in the Stan Original movie Windcatcher. In November 2025, he was named in the cast for Treasure & Dirt.

== Personal life ==
Pell is based in Maddington, a suburb of Perth in Western Australia. Pell's eldest daughter, Tahlia took her own life at the age of 19.

== Filmography ==
=== Film ===
Year	Title	Role	Notes
1993	Blackfellas	Willice	
2001	One Night the Moon	Albert Yang	
2002	Confessions of a Headhunter	Vinnie, the artist	Short film
2002	Australian Rules	Tommy Red	
2003	Cold Turkey	Old Man	
2007	The Turtle	Pop	Short film
2007	September	Michael Parker	
2009	Stone Bros.	Hector	
2009	Last Ride	Ranger Lyall	
2009	Aunty Maggie and the Womba Wakgun	Uncle Peter	Short film
2009	Bran Nue Dae	Mean Drunk	
2011	Mad Bastards	Mad Dog	
2015	Redfern Now: Promise Me	Raymond	Television film
2015	Looking for Grace	Detective	
2016	Red Dog: True Blue	Durack	
2017	Three Summers	Jack	
2017	Nobody's Child	Jimmy	Short film
2020	The Xrossing	Bobbie	
2021	Buckley's Chance	Jules	
2024	Windcatcher	Pop Collins	

=== Television ===
Year	Title	Role	Notes
1996	The Adventures of the Bush Patrol	Wazza	
1998	Minty	Jack	Episode: "If I Were You"
2007–2010	The Circuit	Sam Wallman	12 episodes
2011	Cloudstreet	Bob Crab	3 episodes
2012	Redfern Now	Raymond	Episode: "Raymond"
2013	Hard Rock Medical	Uncle Albert	Episode: "Other Side of the Fence"
2014	The Moodys	Fred	Episode: "Australia Day"
2014	The Gods of Wheat Street	Odin Freeburn	6 episodes
2018	Pine Gap	Paul Dupain	6 episodes
2019–2020	The Heights (Australian TV series)	Uncle Max	48 episodes
2020	Itch	Barry	2 episodes
2021–2022	Firebite	Jalingbirri	5 episodes
2022	MaveriX	Vic Simmons	10 episodes
2022	Mystery Road: Origin	Jack Swan	3 episodes
2025	Reckless	Colins	TV series
2026	Treasure & Dirt		TV series

== Theatre ==
=== As actor ===
Year	Title	Role	Notes	Ref
1985	No Sugar	David Millimurra	Australia & Canada tour with WA Theatre Co	
1988	Barungin (Smell the Wind)		Playhouse, Perth, Arts Theatre, Adelaide with WA Theatre Co	
1988	The First Born Trilogy: No Sugar, The Dreamers, Barungin (Smell the Wind)	David Millimurra	Fitzroy Town Hall, Melbourne with WA Theatre Co & MTC	
1988	Honey Spot		QPAC, Brisbane	
1990	The Silent Years		Deckchair Theatre, Fremantle with Fremantle Festival of Aboriginal Theatre	
1990	Our Town		Playhouse, Perth with Deckchair Theatre	
1991	The Removalists	Kenny	Old Customs House, Fremantle with Deckchair Theatre	
1991	Twelfth Night	Antonio	Octagon Theatre, Perth with Black Swan Theatre Co	
1992	Wild Cat Falling		Narrogin Town Hall, SWY Theatre, Perth	
1993	Tourmaline	Rock / Driver	Perth Institute of Contemporary Arts with Black Swan Theatre Co	
1994	Dead Heart		Old Boans Warehouse, Perth, Eveleigh Railway Yards, Sydney with Black Swan Theatre Co & Belvoir	
1994	Crow	Boofhead	Playhouse, Adelaide, Playhouse, Perth with STCSA	
1995	Cosi		Subiaco Theatre, Perth with Black Swan Theatre Co	
1997	Runamuk		Yirra Yaakin Theatre, Perth	
1998	Welcome to Broome	Uncle Barney	Subiaco Theatre, Perth, Belvoir St Theatre, Sydney with Black Swan Theatre Co	
2003	Strategy for Two Hams		Victoria Hall, Fremantle with Deckchair Theatre	
2003	Message Sticks – New Blak Films		Sydney Opera House with Black Swan Theatre Co	
2008	Jandamarra		Perth Convention and Exhibition Centre with Black Swan Theatre Co	
2010	The Fence		Riverside Theatres Parramatta	
2010	Bindjareb Pinjarra		Victoria Hall, Fremantle with Deckchair Theatre	
2010; 2011	Waltzing the Wilarra		Subiaco Arts Centre, Perth with Yirra Yaakin	
2010	Twelfth Night	Antonio	Playhouse, Perth with Black Swan Theatre Co	
2011	Coranderrk: We Will Show the Country	William Black	Melba Hall, Melbourne, Healesville Sanctuary with La Mama	
2011	A Midsummer Night's Dream		Heath Ledger Theatre, Perth with Black Swan Theatre Co	
2011	Bloodland	Billy	Wharf Theatre, Sydney with STC, Dunstan Playhouse, Adelaide, QPAC, Brisbane with Bangarra Dance Theatre	
2012	Signs of Life	Lu	Heath Ledger Theatre, Perth & Sydney Opera House with Black Swan Theatre Co & STC	
2012–2013	Bindjareb Pinjarra		Australian tour with Deckchair Theatre	
2013; 2014	Coranderrk	Actor 5 / Commissioner 5 / Edward Curr / Thomas Bamfield	Belvoir Theatre, Sydney, Northcote Town Hall, Melbourne with Torres Strait Islander Theatre Coop	
2014	Dust	Eddie / Tony	Heath Ledger Theatre, Perth with Black Swan Theatre Co	
2015	Bindjareb Pinjarra		Sydney Opera House	
2016	The Secret River	Yalamundi	Playhouse, Melbourne with STC	
2017–2018	The Season		Australian tour with Performing Lines	
2017	Endgame	Clov	Heath Ledger Theatre, Perth with Black Swan Theatre Co	
2018	Summer of the Seventeenth Doll	Roo Webber	Heath Ledger Theatre, Perth & Online with Black Swan Theatre Co	
2023	Woolah!		Subiaco Arts Centre, Perth with Yirra Yaakin	
2023	Beyond the Vasse		Saltwater	
2024	Dear Brother	Dad / Uncle Max / Grandad	Bille Brown Theatre, Brisbane with QTC	

=== As writer/director ===
Year	Title	Role	Notes	Ref
1990	No Sugar	Assistant director	Australian tour with WA Theatre Co	
1994; 1996; 1997	Bindjareb Pinjarra	Creator / writer	WA Actors' Centre, Tandanya Theatre, Adelaide, Lennox Theatre, Parramatta	
2000	National Playwrights Conference 2000 - Early Readings	Playwright	Art Gallery of South Australia, Adelaide	
2000	Bindjarreb Pinjarra	Creator / writer	Black Swan Theatre Co	
2001	Solid	Playwright	Butter Factory Theatre, Wodonga, Courtyard Studio, Canberra, Araluen Arts Centre	
2012–2013	Bindjareb Pinjarra	Creator / writer	Australian tour with Deckchair Theatre	
2015	Bindjareb Pinjarra	Creator / writer	Sydney Opera House	

== Awards ==
Year	Work	Award	Category	Result	Ref
1991	Kelton Pell	WA Aboriginal Artist of the Year Award		Won	
1994	Kelton Pell	Swan Gold Award	Best West Australian Actor	Won	
1996		Contemporary Performing Arts Award	Best Collaboration	Won	
2013	Redfern Now	Equity Ensemble Awards	Outstanding Performance by an Ensemble in a Drama Series	Won	
2015	The Gods of Wheat Street	Sichuan TV Festival International Gold Panda Awards	Best Performance by an Actor in a Miniseries or Motion Picture Made for Television	Nominated	
2018	The Season	Theatre Council of Tasmania	Best Performance (Male) – Professional Theatre	Won	
2018	Summer of the Seventeenth Doll	Performing Arts WA Awards	Best Actor in a Mainstage Production (Male)	Won	
2019	Summer of the Seventeenth Doll	Helpmann Awards	Best Male Actor in a Play	Nominated	
2019	Kelton Pell	CinefestOZ	Screen Legend Award for Outstanding Contribution to the Australian Film Industry	Honoured	
2023	Mystery Road: Origin	Equity Ensemble Awards	Outstanding Performance by an Ensemble in a Drama Series for	Won	
2024	Genocide in the Wildflower State	WA Screen Culture Awards	Outstanding Achievement in Performance	Won	
