= Satellite Boy =

- Poster with the tagline: "Courage can take you away from home. Love will lead you back."
- Directed by: Catriona McKenzie
- Written by: Catriona McKenzie
- Produced by: David Jowsey; Julie Ryan; Catriona McKenzie
- Starring: David Gulpilil; Cameron Wallaby; Joseph Pedley; Rohanna Angus; Dean Daley-Jones
- Cinematography: Geoffrey Simpson
- Edited by: Henry Dangar, Logan Wrann
- Music by: David Bridie
- Production company: Satellite Films
- Release dates: 8 September 2012 (TIFF); 10 December 2012 (Perth)
- Running time: 90 minutes
- Country: Australia
- Language: English

Satellite Boy is a 2012 Australian adventure drama film about a young Aboriginal boy struggling to maintain the traditions of his heritage in the modern world when a mining company expands into the region. Written and directed by Catriona McKenzie, the film premiered domestically on 10 December 2012 at the Perth International Arts Festival, two days after being released at the Toronto International Film Festival.

== Plot ==
Ten-year-old Pete lives at a run-down drive-in theatre with his grandfather Jagamarra, whom he calls "Jubbi". The grandfather continually imparts wisdom of the old ways to Pete, who wishes to open a restaurant on the property. The boy hopes his absent mother, Lynelle will return to help with the restaurant, although Jubbi doubts her return to the desolate area of Kimberley. A local mining company soon arrives, claims the land, and will soon build a storage facility on the property, razing everything on it.

Kalmain is a budding arsonist and due to his hobby being burning down abandoned vans, he quickly becomes in trouble with the law, a theme recurring throughout the film.

Pete asks his friend Kalmain to accompany him on a weekend bicycle trip to the city in an attempt to appeal to the company officials. Kalmain is happy to oblige, as he is now on the run from the police. The journey becomes a walkabout for the boys when they become lost. Pete must rely on the sage advice from his grandfather for survival to not only complete the trek into the city and meet with the company, but also with his mother, who wishes to take him to Perth so that she can become a beautician.

== Cast ==
- David Gulpilil as Jagamarra
- Cameron Wallaby as Pete
- Joseph Pedley as Kalmain
- Rohanna Angus as Lynelle
- Dean Daley-Jones as Dave
- Dolores Roberts as Corine
- Callum McKenzie as Callum
- Kaylene Marr as Rosalie
- Jarunba-Mark Weaver as Bellyup
- Dougie McCale as George
- Richard Evans as Old Man
- Pam Barrett as Mrs Evans
- Greg Tait as Aboriginal liaison

== Production ==
=== Background ===
Around the year 2006, writer-director Catriona McKenzie discovered Western Australia's Kimberley region while directing the television series, The Circuit, she felt compelled to tell a story about the Australian outback. Although The Circuit was filmed mainly in Broome, McKenzie visited the Purnululu National Park and its Bungle Bungle Range. She spoke about the plot-driven medium of television and considered it "always very archetypal", she said, adding "That's why I went to the Bungle Bungles, that incredible landscape. If you film the right country, you get that feeling and you can give it off to an audience".

Satellite Boy was the first feature film allowed to shoot in the World Heritage-listed area, with consultation from the Indigenous community. The crew lived in tents and had to carry their equipment on canvas stretchers. Vehicles are not allowed within two kilometres (1.24 miles) of the Bungle Bungles.

McKenzie avoided the film possibly becoming a political statement about mining. She stated, "It's not a political film. It's not anti-mining. But through a whole lot of means, the world is disintegrating. They're stripping everything. Even though it's a resources boom … that means you just can't drink the water and you just can't eat. If you stay connected to country, you wouldn't do that."

McKenzie has also stated that the movie is a "love letter" to her adopted father who showed her "love through action". She added that she "was also interested in the idea of tradition and traditions. And the generational gap. The context for that is the notion of country that I speak about later on".

=== Casting ===
McKenzie stated that she wrote the film for David Gulpilil, who won the $50,000 Red Ochre Award at the Australia Council's National Indigenous Arts Awards for long career in Aboriginal arts. McKenzie likened having Gulpilil in her film to working with "[Robert] De Niro or [Meryl] Streep." Gulpilil also struggled with gout at the time of filming, which received additional praise from the director.

To cast Pete, McKenzie claimed to drive "everywhere for months" with her local casting director, Jub Clerc. They found Wallaby playing in Fitzroy Crossing and asked if he would like to audition. She states Wallaby improvised as if he had read the script.

== Reception ==
=== Critical reception ===
Peter Galvin of SBS called Satellite Boy "beautiful-looking and sweet-natured". He added, "Stripped of its specifics, McKenzie's story offers a series of well-rehearsed themes familiar from a brief history of Indigenous cinema: the city vs. the bush, the spiritual vs. the material, family vs. independence, traditional vs. (white) secular life. Yet, none of this feels stale, tired or worse, preachy." The Hollywood Reporter's John DeFore stated, "McKenzie's vision isn't as otherworldly as some that have taken wide-eyed moviegoers to the outback, but it suggests that...Australia is still big enough to keep secrets from Europeans bent on taming it."

Sandra Hall of The Sydney Morning Herald notes the film "tells a gentle tale about the sustaining glories of the natural world, the spirit of adventure and the interconnectedness between the past and the future." Variety's Eddie Cockrell called the film a "resonant generational drama", adding, "Though steeped in the realism of Kalmain's juvenile delinquency and Lynelle’s yearning for a life removed from her cultural heritage, Satellite Boy balances these modern dilemmas with a subtle yet reverberant symbolism that embraces the history and spirituality of Aboriginal tradition."

=== Accolades ===
In 2013, Satellite Boy earned Best Film and Best Sound nominations for the AACTA Awards, given by the Australian Academy of Cinema and Television Arts. At the Berlin International Film Festival, the film won the Crystal Bear Special Mention Award for Best Film. It also won the festival's International Jury Award for Best Feature Film. At the Palm Springs International Film Festival, McKenzie was nominated for the Grand Jury Prize.

The film also earned McKenzie nominations for the Discovery Award, as well as the International Critics' Award at the 2012 Toronto International Film Festival.

Additional crew:

Uncredited Editors: Logan Wrann, Molly Roostey, Ben Dinky

Uncredited Best boy: Grace Mc'Fen

Producer Catriona McKenzie enlisted the help of natives of Bungle Bungle National park, a filming location of the movie.
