= Felicity Abbott =

New Zealand production designer

- Born: New Zealand
- Education: Elam School of Fine Arts (BFA); Australian Film Television and Radio School (MA Hons, 1999)
- Occupation: Production designer
- Years active: 2000–present

Felicity Abbott is a New Zealand production designer, who has worked in the film and television industry in many countries. Her many film and television credits include Redfern Now, Upgrade, The Luminaries, The Invitation, and the upcoming series My Brilliant Career.

== Early life and education ==
Felicity Abbott was born in New Zealand / Aotearoa, of Māori and Scottish descent.

She completed a BFA (Bachelor of Fine Arts) in Sculpture, at Elam School of Fine Arts, University of Auckland, New Zealand.

She graduated from the Australian Film Television and Radio School in 1999, after completing an MA (Film & Television) (Hons) in Production Design. For her MA thesis, she collaborated with cinematographer Cordelia Beresford, to investigate the relationship between production design and cinematography. She was awarded the Fox Studios Australia Award for Excellence in Design in 1999.

Later in her career, she completed a post-graduate diploma in art psychotherapy and community arts at Metaforà School of Art Therapy in Barcelona, Spain.

== Career ==
Abbott has worked in Australia, New Zealand, the US, Europe, the Balkans, on film and television productions in a range of genres. She is a professional member of the Australian Production Design Guild, the British Film Designers Guild, and the Art Directors Guild Local 800.

She co-designed the short film Restoration, directed by Cordelia Beresford. She also collaborated with Beresford on The Eye Inside.

In 2006, Abbott completed The Catalpa Rescue (US title Irish Escape), directed by Lisa Harney for PBS (US), ABC (Australia), and RTÉ (Ireland) and Playground for director Eve Spence. In 2007, Abbott designed the Goalpost Pictures/Channel 4 film, The Eternity Man, a film opera about the life of Australian Arthur Stace, by British director Julien Temple. The world premiere screening of The Eternity Man was at the Sydney Opera House in June 2008 as part of the Sydney Film Festival.

She did the production design for Bruce Beresford's 2018 comedy-drama Ladies in Black. She collaborated with Rachel Perkins on the 2009 musical film Bran Nue Dae, and again on Mabo, a 2012 biopic about the life and work of Indigenous land rights campaigner Eddie Koiki Mabo.

For the 2020 New Zealand miniseries The Luminaries, the design crew had to build more than 105 unique sets from scratch, to recreate the West Coast of the South Island during the gold rush of the 1860s. This took a year to complete.

Other work by Abbott includes The Last Confession of Alexander Pearce, directed by Michael James Rowland; the 2022 American horror film The Invitation; Amazon Studios' 2022 film Don't Make Me Go; and the 2024 American horror feature Tarot.

She is production designer for the upcoming Netflix series My Brilliant Career, which was being filmed in South Australia and produced in the Adelaide Studios in 2025.

== Awards and nominations ==
- 2014: Winner, ACS Award for Design on a Television Drama in the Australian Production Design Guild (ADPG) Awards, for The Outlaw Michael Howe
- 2014: "Highly commended" in the ADPG Award for Design on a Television Drama, for Redfern Now
- 2015: Nominated, ADPG Award for Design on a Television Drama, for Redfern Now/Promise Me
- 2018: Nominated, AACTA Award for Best Production Design in the 8th AACTA Awards, for Upgrade (with Katie Sharrock)
- 2020: Winner, New Zealand Television Award for Best Production Design, for The Luminaries
- 2023: Nominated, Best Production Design, British Film Designers Guild Awards, Don't Make Me Go
- 2023: Nominated, Best Production Design, British Film Designers Guild Awards, The Invitation
- 2025: Winner, Docklands Studios Melbourne Award for Best Production Design at the ADPG Awards, for Tarot
