= Greg Tait =

Australian actor and musician

- Born: Australia
- Occupations: Actor, musician, businessman, former policeman

Greg Tait is an Indigenous Australian actor, and musician. He is also a former policeman who sits on some Indigenous committees. His acting credits include the role of Texas in the award winning 2011 film, Mad Bastards, Satellite Boy and a recurring role in the series Firebite.

== Background ==
Originally from Halls Creek in the East Kimberley, Western Australia, he is an established singer on the Kimberley Country Music scene. His debut album was Silver Stallion. Up until his acting debut, he had a long career as a policeman. He had no real acting experience, but Mad Bastards' director Brendan Fletcher who was looking for a larger than life character came across him and selected him for the role. Tait took time off his law enforcement job to work with Fletcher.

Leaving school at the age of 12, he spent time in and out of jail and ended up with a criminal record. Fathering a child at 18, he ended up joining the Army Reserves which put him in a different direction. At 21, he was an Aboriginal Police Liaison Officer. He gave up drinking in 1990. As a policeman, he has had to lock up close family members including his sister and brother. He was a policeman for 17 years in Western Australia. He was interviewed by Deadly Vibe magazine regarding his life experiences and the role in the film.

He is a senior member of the Ngarrawanji native title claim group. He is also the vice-president of The Kimberley Stolen Generation Aboriginal Corporation (KSGAC).

== Film work ==
Playing the burly local policeman in Mad Bastards which is set in a small Kimberley town, he tries to keep the peace with locals as well as within his own family. He also forms a men's group. In the film, he is the grandfather of the boy Bullet who is being sought out by his father TJ (played by Dean Daley-Jones). The grandson is in trouble so rather than send him to detention, he sends him to a camp for a couple of weeks. Texas and TJ eventually have a physical confrontation.

He had a role in the film, Satellite Boy which also starred David Gulpilil, Cameron Wallaby, Joseph Pedley and Dean Daley-Jones.

He played the role of Smokey in the Australian series Firebite which ran from 2021 to 2022.

== Filmography ==
Film
Title	Role	Director	Year	Notes
Mad Bastards	Texas	Brendan Fletcher	2010	
Satellite Boy	Aboriginal Liaison	Catriona McKenzie	2012	

Television
Title	Episode	Role	Director	Year	Notes
Firebite	"The Last Bloodhunter"	Smokey	Warwick Thornton	2021	
Firebite	"We Don't Go Down"	Smokey	Warwick Thornton	2021	
Firebite	"I Wanna Go Home"	Smokey	Tony Krawitz	2022	
Firebite	"The Bastard King"	Smokey	Tony Krawitz	2022	
Firebite	"Hero's Life"	Smokey	Brendan Fletcher	2022	
Firebite	"The Rise of the Fallen"	Smokey	Brendan Fletcher	2022	
