= Little J & Big Cuz =

Australian animated television series

- Written by: Beck Cole; Jon Bell; Erica Glynn; Danielle MacLean; Bruce Pascoe; Dot West
- Directed by: Tony Thorne
- Country of origin: Australia
- Original languages: Australian Aboriginal English; Kriol; Various other Aboriginal and Torres Strait Island languages
- No. of seasons: 4
- No. of episodes: 51

Production
- Producer: Ned Lander

Original release
- Network: NITV
- Release: 2017

Little J & Big Cuz is an Australian animated television series first screened on the NITV network in 2017. The 13-part series is directed by Tony Thorne and produced by Ned Lander and developed with the Australian Council for Educational Research. It was written by Beck Cole, Jon Bell, Erica Glynn, Danielle MacLean, Bruce Pascoe and Dot West, with creative input from Margaret Harvey, Leah Purcell and Adrian Wills.

In May 2018, the show was renewed for a second series to air on NITV and ABC Kids in 2019. The series won the 2018 Logie Award for Most Outstanding Children's Program.

== Plot ==
Little J is five and has just started school. His older female cousin, Big Cuz, is ten. They are a couple of Aboriginal Australian kids living with their Nanna and Old Dog, who also narrates. The gaps in Nanna's ramshackle fence lead to Saltwater, Desert and Freshwater Country. With the help of Nanna and their teacher Miss Chen, Little J and Big Cuz are finding out all about culture, community and country.

== Educational value ==
Designed as a school readiness initiative, the series was accompanied by the publication of educational resources designed for preschool and early years teachers. In 2018, educational researchers reviewed the use of Little J and Big Cuz in early childhood, preschool and junior primary settings, producing a series of case studies about the use of the series as a transition to school resource. The research was funded by the Dusseldorp Forum.

== Versions ==
22 episodes are available in various Aboriginal languages, including:

- Djambarrpuyngu
- Pitjantjatjara
- Arrernte
- Walmajarri
- Yawuru
- palawa kani
- Gija
- Warlpiri
- Noongar

== Cast ==
- Miranda Tapsell as Little J
- Deborah Mailman as Big Cuz
- Ningali Lawford-Wolf as Nanna
- Aaron Fa'aoso as Old Dog
- Ursula Yovich as Levi
- Shari Sebbens as Sissy/B Boy
- Renee Lim as Miss Chen
- Mark Coles Smith as Uncle Mick
- Katie Beckett as George/Jacko
- Kylie Farmer as Ally
- Miah Madden as Monti

== Awards ==
=== TV Week Logie Awards ===
Year	Nominee / work	Award	Result
2025	Little J & Big Cuz	Best Children's Program	Nominated
