= The Heights (Australian TV series) =

Australian television series

- Genre: Soap opera Drama
- Created by: Warren Clarke; Que Minh Luu
- Directed by: James Bogle; Andrew Prowse; Renée Webster; Darlene Johnson; Karl Zwicky; Tenika Smith; Kelli Cross; Jub Clerc
- Country of origin: Australia
- Original language: English
- No. of seasons: 2
- No. of episodes: 60

Production
- Executive producers: Debbie Lee; Que Minh Luu; Sally Riley
- Producers: Peta Astbury-Bulsara; Warren Clarke
- Cinematography: Jim Frater
- Editors: Meredith Watson; Jeffrey Peter Pritchard
- Running time: 30 minutes
- Production companies: Matchbox Pictures; For Pete's Sake Productions

Original release
- Network: ABC
- Release: 22 February 2019 – 1 October 2020

The Heights is an Australian television drama series which premiered on ABC on 22 February 2019. In August 2019, the series was renewed for a second season of 30 episodes.

== Plot ==
The series is set in the inner‐city neighbourhood of Arcadia Heights. It explores the relationships between the residents of the Arcadia social housing tower and the people who live in the rapidly gentrifying community that surrounds it.

== Cast ==
=== Main ===
- Marcus Graham (series 1) and Rupert Reid (series 2) as Krez 'Pav' Pavlovic, retired cop
- Shari Sebbens as Leonie Farrell, Pav's estranged wife and corporate lawyer
- Calen Tassone as Mich Pavlovic-Farrell, Pav and Leonie's son
- Roz Hammond as Claudia Rosso, an emergency doctor new to the area
- Bridie McKim as Sabine Rosso, Claudia's teenage daughter with mild cerebral palsy
- Fiona Press as Hazel Murphy, landlady who runs the local pub
- Mitchell Bourke as Ryan Murphy, Hazel's estranged son
- Dan Paris as Mark Davies, local tradie
- Saskia Hampele as Renee Davies, Mark's wife
- Phoenix Raei as Ash Jafari, Iranian refugee struggling with his sexuality
- Yazeed Daher as Kam Jafari, Ash's brother
- Carina Hoang as Iris Tran, Vietnamese grocery store owner
- Koa Nuen as Sully Tran, Iris' gay son
- Cara McCarthy as Ana Novak, nurse
- Briallen Clarke as Shannon Murphy, Hazel's daughter (season 2; recurring season 1)
- Kelton Pell as Uncle Max, Hazel's lover (season 2; recurring season 1)

=== Recurring ===
- Bernie Davis as Bruce Farrell, Leonie's father (season 1)
- Davilia O'Connor as Audrey (season 1)
- Geoffrey Miethe as Ernie, community lawyer
- Noel O'Neill as Watto
- Siria Kickett as Kat Pavlovic-Farrell, Pav and Leonie's daughter
- Asher Yasbincek as Rose
- Melody Rom as Amira
- Nicholas Di Nardo as Dane Worsfield
- Amelia Kelly as Frankie Davies, Mark and Renee's daughter
- Amir Rahimzadeh as Hamid Jafari, Ash's uncle
- Jasmine Sadati as Fatema Jafari, Ash's cousin
- Orlando Borg as Noah Davies, Mark and Renee's daughter
- Rasta Karami as Laila Jafari, Ash's cousin
- Ze Winters as Maryam Jafari, Ash's aunt
- Craig Fong as Benny
- Liam Graham as Tyler (season 1)
- Alex Williams as Dr. Evan Clarke
- Zachary Drieberg as James Fraser (season 1)
- Caris Eves as Amber Bathgate, school teacher
- Angela Mahlatjie as Lottie
- Lynette Narkle as Aunty Pam
- Mary Soudi as Helena (season 2)
- Claire Gazzo as Erika (season 2)
- Megan Hollier as Jill (seasons 1 & 2)
- Kate Lister as Karen Satya (season 2)

== Episodes ==
Series	Episodes	Originally released	
Series	Episodes	First released	Last released
1	30	22 February 2019	16 August 2019
2	30	12 March 2020	1 October 2020

=== Season 1 (2019) ===
No.	Title	Directed by	Written by	Original release date
1	"Welcome to Arcadia Towers"	James Bogle	Warren Clarke	22 February 2019
The residents of Arcadia Towers are left reeling after an abandoned baby is discovered. Hazel is stunned when her estranged son Ryan returns from London.
2	"The New School"	James Bogle	Peter Mattessi	22 February 2019
With the abandoned baby's mother identified, Hazel and Ryan are desperate for answers. Sabine navigates her first day at Arcadia High. Sully invites Ash to dinner with Iris - with disastrous consequences.
3	"Hand in Hand"	Andrew Prowse	Hannah Carroll Chapman	1 March 2019
Ryan and Hazel race to find Shannon as social services gets involved. A smitten Sully buys Ash's affection. Pav and Claudia are unable to deny their attraction. Leonie reluctantly allows Mich to move into the towers.
4	"Pick a Little, Talk a Little"	Andrew Prowse	Romina Accurso	1 March 2019
Pav and Claudia's date is gate-crashed. Sully makes a drunken move on Ash. Ryan and Hazel reopen old wounds as they finally decide what to do with Patch.
5	"We Like To Party"	James Bogle	Megan Palinkas	8 March 2019
Ash struggles on the job with Mark following a night of partying, and Ryan and Hazel discover that their inheritance isn't all that it seems.
6	"Shattered Dreams"	James Bogle	Romina Accurso	8 March 2019
Pav and Claudia's second date gets ruined by their kids, Kam lands himself and Iris in trouble with the police. Hazel refuses to cancel her Mahjong game on account of Patch, and the community come together to make it happen.
7	"Claudia's Dilemma"	Andrew Prowse	Peter Mattessi	15 March 2019
An accident at home makes Renee see red over the unfinished renovations. Claudia struggles to reconcile with Sabine following her discovery that she's sexually active. Iris learns the truth behind Kam's business antics.
8	"Mark's Speech"	Andrew Prowse	Tracey Defty-Rashid & Peter Mattessi	15 March 2019
Mark feels the pressure when Renee insists they get a loan to finish the house renovations. Ash enjoys the high life when he meets up with Tyler and his friends. Kam impresses Iris with his entrepreneurial skills.
9	"Teach Me Tonight"	James Bogle	Magda Wozniak & Hannah Carroll Chapman	22 March 2019
Sully has a disastrous first day at his teaching practical and Claudia establishes some ground rules around Sabine and Dane's relationship.
10	"Love Changes Everything"	James Bogle	Hannah Carroll Chapman	22 March 2019
Mark becomes further entangled in his web of lies when Renee makes a troubling discovery. Hazel questions her ability to mother when Patch falls ill. Ash is unsettled by Tyler's interest in him.
11	"Goodnight Mr. Tom"	Renee Webster	Miley Tunnecliffe & Megan Palinkas	29 March 2019
Ryan and Ana's friendship grows into something more. Claudia's confronted by a gift Sabine receives. Ash becomes disillusioned with Tyler's world and Leonie shuts down Mich's questions about their Aboriginal heritage.
12	"Every Little Thing She Does Is Magic"	Andrew Prowse	Megan Palinkas	29 March 2019
Mich is determined to explore his Aboriginal heritage. Ash disappoints Kam, whilst Ryan has a sweet surprise for Ana. Mark and Renee struggle in the bedroom as Pav and Claudia heat up.
13	"A Place in a Sun"	James Bogle	Katie Beckett & Hannah Carroll Chapman	5 April 2019
Bruce finally opens up to Leonie about her Indigenous mother, Pav and Claudia are bad at being friends with benefits and Iris decides to find Sully a boyfriend.
14	"Blabbermouths"	James Bogle	Romina Accurso	5 April 2019
Pav's new romance with Claudia becomes complicated. Sully loses in love but has a win at school. Ryan and Ana grow closer while preparing the pub for its imminent relaunch.
15	"Pretty Woman"	Renee Webster	Mithila Gupta & Romina Accurso	12 April 2019
Ana and Ryan finally get together, only to be confronted by an unexpected third wheel. Renee is horrified when Mark confesses to his gambling addiction. Claudia and Pav struggle to keep their romance secret.
16	"The Launch"	Andrew Prowse	Megan Palinkas	12 April 2019
Ryan uses the pub's launch to avoid talking to Lottie while Ana's unsure where she stands after Lottie's arrival. Renee tells Mark he needs to get help with his gambling addiction. (Midseason Final)
17	"Nothing But a Heartache"	James Bogle	Magda Wozniak & Romina Accurso	5 July 2019
Ryan learns why Lottie declined his marriage proposal. Renee decides to go back to work in order to pay Mark's debt. Sabine struggles with her heartache while Sully and Fraser take their relationship to the next level. (Midseason Premiere)
18	"I'll Never Let You Go"	James Bogle	Hannah Carroll Chapman	5 July 2019
Dane shares an intimate photo of Sabine. Ryan encourages Ana to give Evan a chance. The Jafaris give Kam a special gift. Claudia panics when Pav delivers on her birthday.
19	"Learning How to Trade"	Renee Webster	Peter Mattessi	12 July 2019
Kam nearly messes up his chances at getting the scholarship but Iris encourages him to keep fighting. Claudia learns of Sabine's photo and the harassment. Mark makes Renee realise that her anger is affecting their family.
20	"The Gift"	Darlene Johnson	Dot West	12 July 2019
Kam lies to his family. Mich receives his grandmother's death certificate, leading Leonie to make a shock discovery. Sully is growing tired of being second fiddle, and Lottie treats Ryan to a romantic evening.
21	"Should I Stay or Should I Go?"	Darlene Johnson	Nick King	19 July 2019
A chance encounter forces Leonie to face up to her past. Pav is frustrated by Claudia's reluctance to admit they're in a relationship. Ana realises that Lottie is here to stay, but can she let Ryan go?
22	"Blast From a Past"	Darlene Johnson	Larissa Behrendt	19 July 2019
Leonie comes into contact with a long-lost relative she was told was dead. Mark's resolve is tested when he's handed a bunch of money. Sully's secret is blown.
23	"More Than Friends"	Andrew Prowse	Melissa Lee Speyer	26 July 2019
Sully and Ash grow closer as Sully navigates the wrath of Iris. Renee and Leonie fight over Renee's spending habits. Ryan realizes the sacrifice Lottie is making by staying in Arcadia for him.
24	"Rumour Has It"	Andrew Prowse	Magda Wozniak	26 July 2019
Mark attempts to win back Renee's favour on Frankie's birthday. Sully realises he can no longer stand playing second fiddle. Leonie makes a drastic decision when she realises work is getting in the way of family.
25	"Don't Let Me Be Misunderstood"	James Bogle	Mithila Gupta	2 August 2019
Ash is confronted when Tyler pressures him. Pav's hurt when he catches Claudia lying about his job to her colleagues. Ana realises she's misjudged Evan. Sully wonders whether he's cut out to be a teacher.
26	"Eye of the Tiger"	James Bogle	Hannah Carroll Chapman	2 August 2019
Tragedy hits Arcadia Towers. Ash struggles with his sexuality. Sabine gets revenge on the boys who have been harassing her with an outrageous piece of public art.
27	"Queen of my Heart"	Andrew Prowse	Nick King	9 August 2019
Hazel and Ryan are shocked when a ghost from the past turns up in Arcadia. Ana and Ryan are forced to face their feelings for each other. Mark attempts to get the spark back into his relationship with Renee.
28	"Walk of Life"	Andrew Prowse	Peter Mattessi	9 August 2019
Shannon returns with a new man and a new lease on life. Renee struggles to face the reality of her new life without Mark. Leonie finds inspiration for a career change in the most unlikely of places.
29	"Decisions"	James Bogle	Hannah Carroll Chapman	16 August 2019
Ryan and Shannon struggle with the decision of whether to leave Arcadia. Kam finds out his results from Embleton. Mark and Renee clash over telling the kids about their decision.
30	"Something I Need"	James Bogle	Warren Clarke	16 August 2019
Hazel faces losing both her children again but won't let them go without a fight. Renee hides a huge secret from Mark and Patch's father is revealed in this shocking finale.

=== Season 2 (2020) ===
No. overall	No. in season	Title	Directed by	Written by	Original release date
31	1	"Diagnosis"	Karl Zwicky	Warren Clarke	12 March 2020
Shortly after revealing that Pav is Patch's father, Shannon flees the Towers and ends up in a car accident. Her latest drama brings Ryan back to Arcadia. Hazel, Mich and Claudia all react badly to Pav's news. Sabine supports Mich and the pair share a surprising moment.
32	2	"Home School"	Karl Zwicky	Hannah Carroll Chapman	19 March 2020
When social services remove Patch from the Murphys, Hazel reluctantly turns to Pav for help. Mich and Sabine contemplate their future. Renee confides in Iris about her pregnancy.
33	3	"Therapy"	Karl Zwicky	Romina Accurso	26 March 2020
A blood drive pushes Pav and Claudia back together. Ana and Evan find themselves at odds. Uncle Max gets some troubling news.
34	4	"Sleepover"	Karl Zwicky	Megan Palinkas	2 April 2020
Kam is reunited with Dane when he starts school at Embleton. Kat's attempt to get to know Patch ends in disaster. Leonie helps Uncle Max with his latest cause, but he is still hiding his health concerns.
35	5	"Goodbye"	Renee Webster	Alexandra Cullen	9 April 2020
Uncle Max receives a devastating diagnosis. Renee makes a huge decision about her family's future. Sabine is uncomfortable when Dane reaches out to her.
36	6	"Lost"	Renee Webster	Katie Beckett	16 April 2020
Max seeks a return to his roots as he deals with his diagnosis in secret. His wisdom helps Mich as he comes to terms with Pav's betrayal. Renee and Mark struggle with their new living situation.
37	7	"Naming Day"	Renee Webster	Peter Mattessi	23 April 2020
Claudia finds herself in danger. News of Ryan and Lottie's split reaches Ana, who contemplates her future with Evan. Ash and Sully clash.
38	8	"Can't Stay Away From You"	Renee Webster	Hannah Carroll Chapman	30 April 2020
As Iris celebrates an important anniversary, she catches wind that the Towers could be under threat. Claudia is in denial about the trauma of her mugging. Ash is ambushed into a date. Uncle Max's health takes a terrifying turn.
39	9	"Are We Still Here?"	Tenika Smith	Jessica Paine	7 May 2020
Hazel is frustrated when Uncle Max continues to refuse support for his chemotherapy. Claudia, Leonie and Renee open up to one another. Sabine decides that honesty is the best policy.
40	10	"Falling Into You"	Tenika Smith	Magda Wozniak	14 May 2020
Renee and Mark make plans for the future. Dane appeals for forgiveness from Sabine. Shannon finds herself in hot water with Leonie.
41	11	"Kings and Queens"	Tenika Smith	Tim Williams	21 May 2020
Leonie's new attraction grows. Mark has a proposal for Renee. Ana makes a gesture of commitment. Pav starts a new job.
42	12	"Same Deep Water"	Tenika Smith	Faith McKinnon	28 May 2020
43	13	"Leader of the Pack"	Kelli Cross	Libby Butler	4 June 2020
44	14	"So Emotional"	Kelli Cross	Nayuka Gorrie	11 June 2020
45	15	"Second Sight"	Karl Zwicky	Aaron McCann	18 June 2020
46	16	"Defying Grafity"	Karl Zwicky	Romina Accurso	25 June 2020
47	17	"Just The Two of Us"	Renee Webster	Jane Allen	2 July 2020
48	18	"Child of Rage"	Renee Webster	Alexandra Cullen	9 July 2020
49	19	"Written in the Stars"	Renee Webster	Nora Niasari	16 July 2020
50	20	"Heartbeat"	Renee Webster	Hannah Carroll Chapman	23 July 2020
51	21	"What's the Story?"	Tenika Smith	Cassandra Nguyen	30 July 2020
52	22	"Diamonds and Pearls"	Tenika Smith	Sarah Bassiuoni	6 August 2020
53	23	"Obsession"	Tenika Smith	Megan Palinkas	13 August 2020
54	24	"A Moment Like This"	Tenika Smith	Dot West	20 August 2020
55	25	"Come Together"	Jub Clerc	Peter Mattessi	27 August 2020
56	26	"Into The Unknown"	Jub Clerc	Peter Mattessi	3 September 2020
57	27	"Love Letters"	Karl Zwicky	Hannah Carroll Chapman	10 September 2020
58	28	"One of Us"	Karl Zwicky	Megan Palinkas	17 September 2020
59	29	"What's Love Got to Do With It?"	Karl Zwicky	Romina Accurso	24 September 2020
60	30	"Salute"	Karl Zwicky	Warren Clarke	1 October 2020

== Production ==
The Heights is produced in Perth, Australia by Matchbox Pictures and For Pete's Sake Productions. It was created by Warren Clarke and Que Minh Luu. The first season was written by Hannah Carroll Chapman, Romina Accurso, Peter Mattessi, Megan Palinkas, Nick King, Clare Atkins, Niki Aken, Dot West, Magda Wozniak, Mithila Gupta, Tracey Defty‐Rashid, Larissa Behrendt, Miley Tunnecliffe, Katie Beckett and Melissa Lee Speyer. The first season was directed by James Bogle, Andrew Prowse, Renée Webster, and Darlene Johnson, and produced by Peta Astbury-Bulsara and Warren Clarke.

Nayuka Gorrie was a writer on the second season.

== International broadcast ==
In the United Kingdom, the first season of The Heights began broadcasting on BBC One in June 2020, during the Doctors summer break. The second season was shown directly after the conclusion of the first, with several episodes airing before their premiere on ABC. In Ireland, RTÉ One began broadcasting double episodes of season one on 10 August 2020, as a summer replacement for Today with Maura and Daithi.

== Reception ==
Colin Vickery of the Herald Sun was unhappy with "the smart alec" at ABC who scheduled the episodes into one-hour blocks during the first season. He went onto praise the series, writing "This gritty little urban drama, with its strong multicultural cast, plays like an edgier version of Neighbours or Home and Away. I'm especially enjoying seeing Mad as Hell's Roz Hammond in a serious dramatic role as mum Claudia Rosso."

=== Awards and nominations ===
Year	Association	Category	Recipients and nominees	Result	Ref
2019	AWGIE Awards	Best Script for a Television Serial	Hannah Carroll Chapman for Episode 26	Nominated	
2019	Screen Producers Australia Awards	Drama Series Production of the Year	Matchbox Pictures and For Pete's Sake Productions	Nominated	
2020	Australian Directors' Guild Awards	Best Direction of a TV or SVOD Drama Serial	Renee Webster for Episode 15	Nominated	
2020	Australian Directors' Guild Awards	Best Direction of a TV or SVOD Drama Serial	Darlene Johnson for Episode 22	Nominated	
2020	AWGIE Awards	Best Script for a Television Serial	Peter Mattessi for Season 2, Episode 7	Won	
2020	AWGIE Awards	Best Script for a Television Serial	Megan Palinkas for Season 2, Episode 28	Nominated	
2020	AWGIE Awards	Best Script for a Television Serial	Romina Accurso for Season 2, Episode 29	Nominated	
2020	AWGIE Awards	Best Script for a Television Serial	Warren Clarke for Season 2, Episode 30	Nominated	
2020	Equity Ensemble Awards	Most Outstanding Performance by an Ensemble in a Drama Series	The Heights S1 ^{(See below)}	Won	
2021	Australian Directors' Guild Awards	Best Direction in a TV or SVOD Drama Serial episode	Tenika Smith for Season 2, Episode 24	Nominated	

== Notes ==
^2020 Equity Ensemble Award nominees for "Most Outstanding Performance by an Ensemble in a Drama Series": Marcus Graham, Shari Sebbens, Calen Tassone, Roz Hammond, Bridie McKim, Fiona Press, Mitchell Bourke, Dan Paris, Saskia Hampele, Phoenix Raei, Yazeed Daher, Carina Hoang, Koa Nuen, Cara McCarthy and Briallen Clarke
