= Dean Daley-Jones =

Australian actor

- Born: Australia
- Occupation: Actor
- Years active: 2010–present

Dean Daley-Jones is an Australian actor who played the lead role in the 2010 film Mad Bastards which was directed by Brendan Fletcher. He had a supporting role in Ivan Sen's 2011 film, Toomelah. He has also had roles in Australian television series Redfern Now and The Gods of Wheat Street.

== Background ==
Dean Daley Jones is a member of the Nyoongar tribe.

Daley-Jones had had trouble with the law which was evident in his late 20s. In 2007 and aged in his mid 30s, he moved to Broome to get a new start. He then began his quest to change things in his life and was working as a builder's laborer. One day he found out about a "Blackfella" film being made in the area and he showed up for a job as a crewman. He started off with him doing manual work carrying and move equipment. He gave an account of his own life story to contribute to the film Mad Bastards, and ended up getting the lead role. The character he played in the film, TJ wasn't too far from the man he used to be. He had anger issues due to the way his people were treated. He didn't always deal with situations in the right way. He was aware of the impact and the message portrayed in the film and who it can reach.

Daley-Jones ended up being a mentor to Aboriginal prisoners. It started when Lea McKay, the coordinator of Aboriginal prison services watched Mad Bastards and seeing Daley-Jones in it she knew she had to get hold of him. As a result he visited Casuarina Prison to talk to Aboriginal prisoners about breaking the crime cycle.

== Film career ==
In Mad Bastards he plays the part of TJ, who is the father of a boy who has had trouble with the law. The boy's grandfather (played by Greg Tait) is the local policeman Texas . He sends him to a camp for a couple of weeks. TJ and Texas eventually clash physically. He was interviewed by Onya Magazine about his work in the film.

He had a role in the 2011 film, Toomelah which was directed by Ivan Sen. In the film he plays the part of Bruce a gang leader. Also that year, "Walk Tall, Stand Strong'" was released. Part of the sixth season of Deadly Yarns, he both wrote and directed the documentary short.

In Redfern Now he played the part of a tough late 30s, Aboriginal man Indigo who is released from jail for killing a man in a street fight. He has to deal with certain personal issues, one of which is his thoughts on his wife's fidelity.

He had a role in the 2018 film, Flotsam Jetsam which was directed by Banjo Fitzsimon and featured other actors, Michael Gupta, Richard Green (XXIV), Hunter McMahon, Geraldine Hakewill and Sean Barker.

== Filmography ==
Film
Title	Role	Director	Year	Notes
Mad Bastards	TJ	Brendan Fletcher	2010	
Toomelah	Bruce	Ivan Sen	2011	
Satellite Boy	Dave	Catriona McKenzie	2012	
Convict	Tony	David Field and George Basha	2014	
Flotsam Jetsam	Stevie	Banjo Fitzsimon	2018	

Television shows
Title	Episode	Role	Director	Year	Notes
Redfern Now	"Sweet Spot"	Indigo	Leah Purcell	2012	
Redfern Now	"Starting Over"	Indigo	Rachel Perkins	2013	
The Gods of Wheat Street	"The Mighty Are Fallen"	Jimmy McIntyre	Wayne Blair	2014	

Documentary etc.
Title	Role	Director	Year	Notes
Walk Tall Stand Strong	Director and writer	Dean Daley-Jones	2011	Short
Toomelah: Behind the Scenes	Self		2012	Video short documentary
Toomelah: Interview with Director Ivan Sen	Self		2012	Video documentary short
1st AACTA Awards	TJ / self	Simon Francis	2012	
