= Pemulwuy =

Aboriginal Australian military leader (c. 1750–1802)

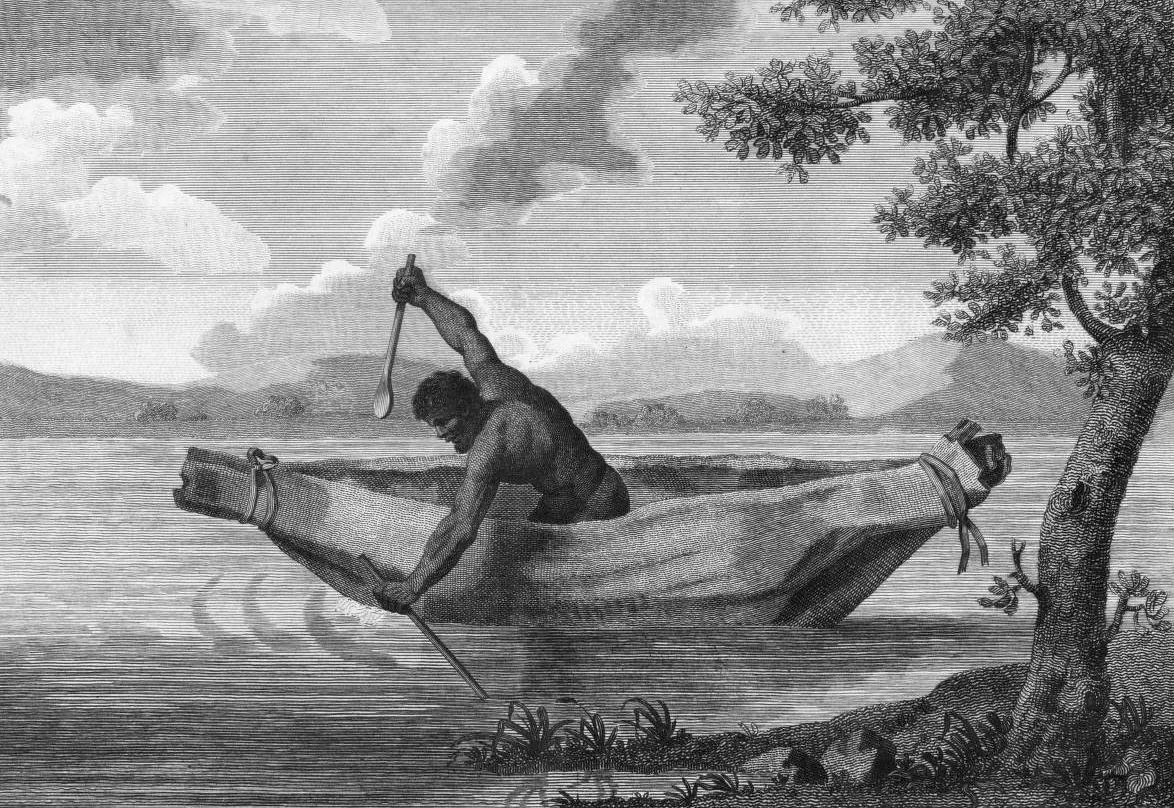
- Engraving of Pemulwuy, 1804
- Born: c. 1750 near Kamay
- Died: c. 2 June 1802 (aged 51–52); Colony of New South Wales
- Other names: Pimbloy, Pemulvoy, Pemulwoy, Pemulwy, Bimblewove, Bumbleway, Bembulwoyan
- Occupation: Warrior
- Known for: Resistance to the British colonisation of Australia
- Movement: Aboriginal resistance
- Children: Tedbury
- Military career
- Conflicts: Australian frontier wars; Hawkesbury and Nepean Wars; Battle of Richmond Hill; Battle of Parramatta

Pemulwuy (Note: His name has also been rendered as Pimbloy, Pemulvoy, Pemulwoy, Pemulwy or Pemulwye, or sometimes by contemporary Europeans as Bimblewove, Bumbleway or Bembulwoyan.) (/pɛməlwɔɪ/ PEM-əl-woy; c. 1750 – c. 2 June 1802) was a Bidjigal warrior of the Dharug Nation, an Aboriginal Australian people from New South Wales. One of the most famous Aboriginal resistance fighters in the colonial era, he is noted for his resistance to British colonisation which began with the arrival of the First Fleet in January 1788.

Pemulwuy lived near Botany Bay, known as Kamay in the Dharug language. He is considered to have been a carradhy (cleverman), a Dharug spiritual healer and culture keeper. In 1790, Pemulwuy began a twelve-year guerrilla war against the colonists, which continued until his killing and beheading in 1802.

When Pemulwuy grew into manhood, he became Bemul Wagan, which represents "the earth and the crow". According to Dharug Indigenous activist Uncle Richard Green, "he wasn't very impressed with the mix of cultures. He preferred that we stayed within our own peoples". Another name for him was Butu Wagan, which means "crow".

== Early life ==
Pemulwuy was born around 1750 in the area of Botany Bay in New South Wales, Australia. He was born with a turned eyeball or other blemish in his left eye. According to historian Eric Willmot:

Normally, a child that showed an obvious deformity would've been, well, people would have expected that child to be sent back, to be reborn again. It was generally thought that humans, like everything, came from the land. And that a woman, the actual act of conception, was a woman being infected by a child's spirit from the land. And that child grows within her. And so he was different and he became more different. He became better than everybody else. Whatever anyone else could do, Pemulwuy did it better. He could run further, he was one of the best, he could use a spear like no-one else could. And so, around him, was created an aura of difference. So much so that he was said to be a clever man. In an Aboriginal society, [a] clever man is often a man who deals with the spiritual nature of things and sorcery even.

His contemporary Colebee said that Pemulwuy's left foot was distinctive as it had been damaged by a club, perhaps to mark him as a carradhy (cleverman or healer). The Kurdaitcha (ritual executioners and lawmen) of Central Australia similarly have a foot deliberately mutilated.

His people, the Bidjigal, are the original inhabitants of Toongabbie and Parramatta in Sydney.

Before his resistance effort, Pemulwuy would hunt meat and provide it to the food-challenged new colony in exchange for goods.

== Conflict with settlers ==
Pemulwuy's War
Date	1790–1802
Location	Botany Bay, Liverpool, Parramatta, Hawkesbury River, New South Wales
Result	British victory

Belligerents
(Kingdom of Great Britain) British colonists	Dharug Nation

Commanders and leaders
(Kingdom of Great Britain) Governor Arthur Phillip (1790–1792) (Kingdom of Great Britain) Governor John Hunter (1795–1800) (United Kingdom) Governor Philip Gidley King (1800–1802)	Pemulwuy †

=== Spearing of McIntyre ===
On 9 December 1790, a shooting party left for Botany Bay, including a sergeant of marines and three convicts, including Governor Phillip's gamekeeper John McIntyre. According to Watkin Tench:

About one o’clock, the sergeant was awakened by a rustling noise in the bushes near him, and supposing it to proceed from a kangaroo, called to his comrades, who instantly jumped up. On looking about more narrowly, they saw two natives with spears in their hands, creeping towards them, and three others a little farther behind. As this naturally created alarm, McIntyre said, "don’t be afraid, I know them", and immediately laying down his gun, stepped forward, and spoke to them in their own language. The Indians, finding they were discovered, kept slowly retreating, and McIntyre accompanied them about a hundred yards, talking familiarly all the while. One of them now jumped on a fallen tree and, without giving the least warning of his intention, launched his spear at McIntyre and lodged it in his left side. The person who committed this wanton act was described as a young man with a speck or blemish on his left eye. That he had been lately among us was evident from his being newly shaved.

The group was pursued by the settlers with muskets, but they escaped. McIntyre was taken back to the settlement, gravely wounded. The attack was likely revenge for McIntyre's violence against the natives and his hunting of sacred "totem animals" which violated Aboriginal law.

=== Governor Phillip's military expeditions ===
An irate Governor Phillip ordered Lieutenant Tench to gather his company of marines and lead an expedition against the Bidjigal in retaliation for Pemulwuy's attack on McIntyre. He ordered that two Bidjigal were to be captured and ten killed; these ten were then to be beheaded and the heads returned to the settlement. Tench swiftly suggested an alternative and less bloodthirsty plan, that six Bidjigal be captured and brought to Sydney Cove but that none be killed out of hand.

Tench's proposal was accepted, and the expedition set out on 14 December in search of Pemulwuy and the Bidjigal tribe. The expedition was the largest military operation since the founding of the colony, comprising Tench, Lieutenants William Dawes and John Poulden, and 46 marines. However, despite three days of searching there was no sign of the Bidjigal. On 17 December, Tench ordered a return to Sydney Cove to gather supplies.

=== Resistance ===
Pemulwuy persuaded other Dharug to join his campaign against the settlers. From 1792 Pemulwuy led raids on British colonists at Parramatta, Georges River, Prospect, Toongabbie, Brickfield and Hawkesbury River. His most common tactic was to burn crops and kill livestock. In May 1795, Pemulwuy or one of his followers speared a convict near present-day Chippendale.

In December 1795, Pemulwuy and his warriors attacked a work party at Botany Bay which included John "Black" Caesar, one of the earliest settlers of African descent and a well-known bushranger. Caesar managed to crack Pemulwuy's skull and many thought he had killed him, but he survived.

=== Battle of Parramatta ===
In early 1797, large groups of Aboriginal warriors led by Pemulwuy made a series of raids on the Northern Farms, a region just to the north-east of Parramatta now known as the suburbs of Oatlands and Carlingford. During one of these raids in March, a male and a female settler were killed. The other Northern Farms settlers then decided to organise and arm themselves into a large band to track down and punish Pemulwuy and his Aboriginal raiders.

At dawn on a day in late March, they surprised about 100 Aboriginals just outside Parramatta (probably at North Rocks), who subsequently fled. The pursuit continued through the morning toward Parramatta, where the armed settlers decided to rest. One hour later, according to David Collins, "a large body of natives, headed by Pe-mul-wy, a riotous and troublesome savage" approached Parramatta.

The settlers were now joined by a contingent of foreign soldiers from Britain who were occupying Parramatta. When they attempted to seize Pemulwuy, he threw a spear at a soldier, prompting the invading troops and settlers to open fire. Pemulwuy was shot seven times and was wounded. The Aboriginal warriors threw many spears, hitting one man in the arm. The difference in firepower was evident and five Aboriginal warriors were killed instantly, with many others wounded. This skirmish became known as the Battle of Parramatta.

=== Escape ===
The wounded Pemulwuy was captured and placed into custody at the hospital in Parramatta. Despite still having buckshot in his head and body, and wearing a leg-iron, Pemulwuy escaped from the hospital. This added to the belief that he was a carradhy.

After the Battle of Parramatta, Pemulwuy obtained the reputation amongst the Aboriginal people of being invincible to British firearms, and was thought to have been the main organiser of subsequent raids on British farms to obtain food. However, his injuries had affected his ability as a fighter and his resistance was on a smaller and more sporadic scale for the rest of his life. He also appeared to have reached a sort of reconciliation with Governor John Hunter in late 1797, where Hunter agreed not to punish him.

Convicts William Knight and Thomas Thrush escaped and joined the Aboriginal resistance.

According to Dharug man Uncle Richard Green, "with simple spears, rocks, boomerangs, stones, he [Pemulwuy] defeated the British army that they sent here. Every single soldier except for Watkin Tench, that they sent in pursuit of Pemulwuy either walked back into the community with their saddle over their shoulders or they didn't make it back".

== Death ==
Governor Philip Gidley King issued an order on 22 November 1801 to bring Pemulwuy in dead or alive, with an associated reward. The order attributed the killing of two men, the dangerous wounding of several others, and a number of robberies, to Pemulwuy.

Just before 2 June 1802, Pemulwuy was shot and killed, possibly by explorer and sailor Henry Hacking, the first mate of the Royal Navy ship Lady Nelson.

"After being wounded, all the people believed that he was immune to British bullets", says Richard Green. "So he'd stand out in front and, you know, stand right out in front of them and take them on, you know? So after 12 years, his time ran out. He got his shot and he took it."

Following the death of Pemulwuy, Governor King wrote to Lord Hobart that on the death of Pemulwuy he was given his head by the Aboriginal people as Pemulwuy "had been the cause of all that had happened". The Governor issued orders with immediate effect to not "molest or ill-treat any native", and to re-admit them to the areas of Parramatta and Prospect from which they had been forcibly excluded.

Pemulwuy's head was preserved in spirits. It was sent to England to Sir Joseph Banks accompanied by a letter from Governor King, who wrote: "Although a terrible pest to the colony, he was a brave and independent character."

Pemulwuy's son Tedbury continued fighting for a number of years before being killed in 1810.

The circumstances relating to Pemulwuy's death and the fate of his remains were described by the Sydney Morning Herald in 2003 as "Australia's oldest murder mystery".

=== Skull ===
Repatriation of the skull of Pemulwuy has been requested by Sydney's Aboriginal people. In 2010, Prince William announced he would return Pemulwuy's skull to his Aboriginal relatives. One trail led to the Natural History Museum in London, but the museum has no record of the skull, and it has not yet been located among the estimated 3,000 other remains of Aboriginal people in the UK.

== In the arts and media ==
In the 1980s the band Redgum composed a song about Pemulwuy entitled "Water and Stone".

Australian composer Paul Jarman composed a choral work entitled Pemulwuy. It has become an Australian choral standard, and was performed by the Biralee Blokes in their victory in the ABC Choir of the Year 2006.

In 1987 Weldons published Pemulwuy: The Rainbow Warrior by Eric Willmot, a best-selling novel providing a fictionalised account using early colonial documents as source. Matilda Media re-released the book in 1994.

In 2008, Marlene Cummins released an eponymous song about Pemulwuy. This was later presented to Prince William along with a petition to bring Pemulwuy's head back to his people.

In 2009, a remote boxing game for the Wii console, Pemulwuy Dream Team, was developed.

Pemulwuy: The Movie, written by Jon Bell and directed by Catriona McKenzie, was in development in 2019. The filmmakers consulted Uncles Richard Green (who served as dialect consultant), Vic Simms, and Colin Isaacs, as local community elders. Philip Noyce, as executive producer, travelled from Los Angeles, along with McKenzie, in August 2019 to meet the elders. The film was due to begin production in 2021. It was to be produced by Andrew Dillon and Ian Sutherland of That's‑A‑Wrap Productions, with journalist Stan Grant, Mathew Walker, and James Robinson executive producing alongside Noyce.

Pemulwuy was portrayed by actor Wakarra Gondarra in reenactment sequences in the 2022 documentary series The Australian Wars.

In 2024, it was announced that Kaytetye director Warwick Thornton had boarded a project to create a biopic about Pemulwuy titled First Warrior, with Andrew Dillon (of That's‑A‑Wrap Productions) producing and co-writing with Jon Bell. Actors Sam Worthington and Jason Clarke, along with filmmakers Phillip Noyce, Stuart Beattie, and Shana Levine, are involved in the project.

== Legacy ==
The Sydney suburb of Pemulwuy, New South Wales is named after him, as well as Pemulwuy Park in Redfern, New South Wales.

The redevelopment of The Block in the Sydney suburb of Redfern by the Aboriginal Housing Company was named the Pemulwuy Project.

In 2015, the National Museum of Australia installed a plaque honouring his role in Australian history as part of the Defining Moments project.

In 2017, a Sydney Ferries Emerald-class ferry was named Pemulwuy.

The Pemulwuy Loop in the City of Parramatta pays homage to the warrior.

== See also ==
- Australian frontier wars
- Jandamarra of the Bunuba nation
- Kurdaitcha, who are also marked through deliberate damage to the foot
- Musquito a warrior of the Gai-Mariagal clan
- Tunnerminnerwait was an Australian aboriginal resistance fighter and Parperloihener clansman from Tasmania
- Windradyne warrior and resistance leader of the Wiradjuri nation
- Yagan, a warrior and resistance leader of the Noongar tribe, in what is now the area around Perth, Western Australia
- List of Indigenous Australian historical figures

== Sources ==
- Moore, John (1987). The First Fleet Marines. University of Queensland Press. ISBN 0702220655.
- Taylor, Gail (1999). Pemulwuy. Cambridge University Press. ISBN 9780521776257.
