= Pemulwuy Dream Team =

2009 Australian video game

- Platform: Wii
- Release: 2009

Pemulwuy Dream Team is a remote boxing game for the Wii console. It features Kooris, Naryma and Wasana, fighting against drugs in Tony Mundine's Redfern Gym in the underdeveloped, heavily indigenous Sydney, Australia, suburb of Redfern.

== Background ==
A brainchild of the actual young Koori twins, Naryma and Wasana Dixon, Pemulwuy Dream Team was spawned through an animation workshop run by local artists, Keg de Souza and Zanny Begg, in the Redfern Community Centre. The game takes its name from Pemulwuy the eighteenth century Bidjigal freedom fighter. The young twins identified drugs and alcohol as the biggest enemies faced by the Redfern community.
