= Leon Burchill =

Australian actor

- Born: Leon Lennon Burchill; 24 December 1974 (age 51); Cairns, Queensland
- Other name: Jina Binya
- Education: Mosman High School; National Institute of Dramatic Art (2003–2005)
- Occupation: Actor
- Years active: 2005–present
- Notable work: Stone Bros. (2009); Wyrmwood (2014)

Leon Burchill is an Australian actor, known for his roles in the films Stone Bros. and Wyrmwood and the television series Redfern Now.

== Early life and education ==
Leon Lennon Burchill was born on 24 December 1974 in the Far North Queensland city of Cairns. His parents (including mother Linda) gave him his middle name after John Lennon. His traditional name, 'Jina Binya', means 'sea eagle'. He is one of six, with two sisters and three brothers.

Burchill was the captain of Mosman High School, and grew up with a grounding in traditional dance. He then began studying drama in Melbourne, Brisbane and Sydney – with the aim of becoming an actor. He went on to attend Sydney's National Institute of Dramatic Art (NIDA), after being accepted into the school in 2003 on his second attempt, graduating in 2005. He was the only Aboriginal student there at the time.

Outside of acting, Burchill worked at Taronga Zoo and the Sydney Royal Botanic Gardens as an Aboriginal education officer, teaching visitors about bush tucker and medicine.

== Career ==
Burchill co-starred with Luke Carroll in 2009 Aboriginal Australian stoner road trip comedy film Stone Bros., in the role of Charlie. That same year, he portrayed the recurring character Sid in children's television drama series My Place, based on the award-winning picture book of the same name by Nadia Wheatley and Donna Rawlins.

Burchill went on to play the role of Frankie in acclaimed ABC drama series Redfern Now, before playing Benny in 2014 cult zombie action-horror film Wyrmwood.

On stage, Burchill played former AFL player Jim Krakouer in Krakouer! which toured in 2011.

== Filmography ==
=== Film ===
Year	Title	Role	Type	Ref.
2009	Stone Bros.	Charlie	Feature film	
2011	The Forgotten Men	Bearded Man	Short film	
2013	Boat People	Warrior Arthur / Arthur James Smith III	Short film	
2014	Wyrmwood	Benny	Feature film	
2017	Wild Squad Adventures	Agent Leon	Short film	
2019	Utopia	Businessman (uncredited)	Short film	
TBA	Dream Kiss Cry	Django's friend	Post-production	

=== Television ===
Year	Title	Role	Type	Ref.
2009	False Witness (also The Diplomat)	The Didgeridoo Busker	TV movie	
2009	My Place	Sid	3 episodes	
2012	Redfern Now	Frankie	1 episode	
2019	Les Norton	Mumbi	1 episode	
2020	Thalu	Brother	Miniseries, 1 episode	
2022	The Australian Wars	Dharug Warrior	Documentary miniseries, 1 episode	
