= The Adventures of the Bush Patrol =

Australian children's television series

- Created by: Carol Matthews; Corinne Whitbread; Oscar Whitbread
- Starring: Wendy Strehlow
- Country of origin: Australia
- No. of episodes: 78

Production
- Running time: 25 minutes

Original release
- Network: Seven Network
- Release: 1 September 1996 – June 1997

The Adventures of the Bush Patrol (also known simply as Bush Patrol) is an Australian children's television series which first screened in 1996 on the Seven Network.

== Plot ==
The series follows the adventures of Tracey, her brother Ben and their mother Maggie, who patrols the Katta-Moornda National Park as a Ranger.

== Cast ==
- Wendy Strehlow as Maggie Dean
- Lisa Laird as Tracey Dean
- Steele Scriberas as Ben Dean
- Emma Booth as Dana Drysdale
- Rodney Bell as Tony Harrison
- Dylan Landre Dom
- Kyle Morrison Gully
- Blake Muir as Todd Catchpenny
- Belinda Pedler as Pepa
- Kate Whitbread as Kelly Davidson
- Gillian Alexy as Eloise
- Joseph Isaia as Mr. Clark
- Brook O'Keefe as Minnie Clark
- Kelton Pell as Wazza
