= Mad Bastards =

2011 Australian film

- Theatrical film poster
- Directed by: Brendan Fletcher
- Written by: Brendan Fletcher
- Produced by: Brendan Fletcher; David Jowsey; Alan Pigram; Stephen Pigram
- Starring: Dean Daley-Jones; Lucas Yeeda; Greg Tait
- Cinematography: Allan Collins
- Edited by: Claire Fletcher
- Music by: Alan Pigram; Stephen Pigram; Alex Lloyd
- Release date: 26 January 2011 (Sundance)
- Running time: 94 minutes
- Country: Australia
- Language: English
- Budget: $3.2 million
- Box office: $203,598 (Australia)

Mad Bastards is a 2011 Australian drama film written and directed by Brendan Fletcher. Set in the Kimberley region of Western Australia, the film uses mainly local Aboriginal people in the cast, and draws on their stories for the plotline. It is Fletcher's debut film and it premiered at the 2011 Sundance Film Festival.

== Plot ==
Years ago, TJ abandoned his wife and son, and as time passes his conscience tells him it is time to face up to his responsibilities as a father. TJ is an Aboriginal man living in Western Australia and has a weakness for alcohol and a habit of getting into fights. TJ's son Bullet is nearly as troubled as he is - at the age of 13, he has already been arrested for arson, and instead of serving a sentence in a juvenile detention home, he is released to the custody of Elders. Bullet is not eager to reacquaint himself with TJ, but both realise they need to settle their scores with one another, and Bullet's grandfather Texas steps in to help.

== Cast ==
- Dean Daley-Jones as TJ
- Lucas Yeeda as Bullet
- Karla Hart as TJ's sister
- Alex Lloyd as Musician
- Douglas Macale as Uncle Black
- Patrick McCoy-Geary as Bullet's mate
- Kelton Pell as Mad Dog
- Alan Pigram as Musician
- Ngaire Pigram as Nella
- Stephen Pigram as Musician
- Greg Tait as Texas
- John Watson as Bush Camp Elder

== Production ==
Director and scriptwriter Brendan Fletcher, usually based in Sydney, wrote the film in collaboration with the lead actors, who were local Indigenous people, and John Watson, an elder of the Jarlmadangah people. The storyline was developed from the true stories of local Indigenous people of the Kimberley region in Western Australia, where the film was shot.

Greg Tait, a Gidja man was a reformed young offender who became a policeman, was given a leading role.

The film was co-produced by musician brothers Alan Pigram and Stephen Pigram, who also provided an original score and performed in the film, along with David Jowsey and Fletcher. Ngaire Pigram, Stephen's daughter, played the female lead role.

== Reception ==
Mad Bastards received positive reviews from critics and audiences, earning an approval rating of 88% on Rotten Tomatoes. Michelle Orange of SBS gave the film three stars out of five. She observed that the "over-reliance on score sets up an avoidant rhythm that begins to feel like a lack of narrative confidence." However she also points out that "Fletcher’s atmospheric approach is not without moments of emotional power, and the raw, unyielding landscapes of Northwestern Australia are framed to resonant effect."

== Awards and nominations ==
Award	Category	Subject	Result
AACTA Award (1st)	AFI Members' Choice Award	Brendan Fletcher, David Jowsey, Alan Pigram, Stephen Pigram	Nominated
AACTA Award (1st)	Best Film	Brendan Fletcher, David Jowsey, Alan Pigram, Stephen Pigram	Nominated
AACTA Award (1st)	Best Original Screenplay	Brendan Fletcher	Nominated
AACTA Award (1st)	Best Young Actor	Lucas Yeeda	Nominated
AACTA Award (1st)	Best Sound	Phil Judd	Nominated
AACTA Award (1st)	Best Sound	Nick Emond	Nominated
AACTA Award (1st)	Best Sound	Johanna Emond	Nominated
ADG Award	Best Direction in a Feature Film	Brendan Fletcher	Nominated
AFCA Award	Best Director	Brendan Fletcher	Nominated
APRA Music Award	Feature Film Score of the Year	Brendan Fletcher	Nominated
APRA Music Award	Feature Film Score of the Year	Alan Pigram	Nominated
APRA Music Award	Feature Film Score of the Year	Stephen Pigram	Nominated
ASE Award	Best Editing in a Feature Film	Claire Fletcher	Nominated
ASSG Award	Best Achievement in Sound for Film Sound Recording	Nick Emond	Won
Inside Film Awards	Independent Spirit Award	Brendan Fletcher, David Jowsey, Alan Pigram, Stephen Pigram	Won
Sundance Film Festival (2011)	Grand Jury Prize	Brendan Fletcher	Nominated
