= Tammy Clarkson =

Australian actress

Tammy Clarkson, also known as Tammy Clarkson Jones, is an Australian actress, known for her role in the 2007 television drama The Circuit.

== Early life ==
Tammy Clarkson, also known as Tammy Clarkson Jones, is originally from Geraldton in Western Australia.

== Career ==
=== Stage ===
Clarkson worked on stage before appearing on screen. She appeared in the February 2002 production of Casting Doubts (written by Maryanne Sam) by Playbox Theatre Company with Ilbijerri Aboriginal and Torres Strait Islander Theatre Cooperative at the Malthouse Theatre in Melbourne. In 2005 she played Dolly in Wesley Enoch's production of Rainbow's End, written by Jane Harrison and staged at the amphitheatre at Melbourne Museum.

=== Television ===
Clarkson is perhaps best known for her role in The Circuit, in which she plays Bella Noble. This series aired on SBS in 2007 for season one, and in 2009 for season two.

In 2013, Clarkson played Indigenous woman and cultural anthropologist Mattie in an episode of Redfern Now called "Consequences", written by actor and writer Leah Purcell, which she says was based on her own life.

== Awards ==
- 2008: Winner, Graham Kennedy Award for Most Outstanding New Talent, at the Logies
- 2007: Nominated, AFI Awards Best Lead Actress in Television Drama

== Filmography ==
| Year | Title | Role | Notes |
|---|---|---|---|
| 2007, 2009–2010 | The Circuit | Bella Noble | 12 episodes |
| 2013 | Redfern Now | Mattie | Episode: "Consequences" |
| 2015 | Ready for This | Grace Mackay | 4 epidodes |
