= Boxing Day (2007 film) =

2007 Australian film

- Film poster
- Directed by: Kriv Stenders
- Written by: Richard Green; Kriv Stenders
- Produced by: Kristian Moliere
- Starring: Richard Green; Tammy Anderson; Syd Brisbane
- Cinematography: Kriv Stenders
- Edited by: Gabriella Muir
- Release date: 23 February 2007 (Adelaide)
- Running time: 82 minutes
- Country: Australia
- Language: English
- Box office: A$2,588 (Australia)

Boxing Day is a 2007 Australian drama film shot, co-written, and directed by Kriv Stenders. It is shot in semi-documentary style, showing 82 minutes in the life of an ex-convict and recovering alcoholic, played by Richard Green.

== Synopsis ==
The film blends documentary with fiction, as it shows 82 minutes in the life of an ex-convict and recovering alcoholic.

== Cast ==
- Richard Green as Chris
- Tammy Anderson as Donna
- Syd Brisbane as Dave
- Stuart Clark as Owen
- Catriona Hadden as Cathy
- Misty Sparrow as Brooke
- Ming Jeng Chew as himself

== Production ==
Boxing Day was partly funded by the Adelaide Film Festival. It was based on stories provided by Indigenous actor Richard Green, that he had heard through three stints in jail. He and director Stenders collaborated for a year before shooting, but in the final shoot, the cast improvised much of the script. It was shot on digital video. Although it was intended to be one continuous shot in real time, 12 cuts were made.

Only one professional actor, Syd Brisbane, is used in the film, and much of the script is improvised. The 82 minutes are shot in 12 takes.

== Release ==
The film premiered at the third edition of the Adelaide Film Festival in 2007. It did not receive Australia-wide cinematic release, only being on seen in a single Melbourne cinema in November 2007.

It was released on DVD in 2014, which included an entire alternative version of the film, featuring the same actors wearing different clothing.

== Reception ==
It was reviewed by Margaret Pomeranz and David Stratton on At the Movies, who gave it 3.5 and 3 stars respectively. Pomeranz thought it was "a film to admire rather than one to embrace", as "adventurous filmmaking", and Stratton agreed, and both praised the performances, singling out Misty Sparrow for special mention.

Sharon Hurst, writing on Cinephilia, gave the film 4 out of 5 stars, calling it an "impressive low-budget film". She wrote: "All the cast, from the non-actor Sparrow as Brooke through to experienced Brisbane as Dave give wonderful performances".

Upon its release on DVD in 2014, Luke Buckmaster of The Guardian called the film a "superb experiment in technical and performance-based detail".

Upon the death of Dharug actor Richard Green in 2021, Douglas Smith, writing for NITV, included Boxing Day in a list of other "iconic Australian films" in which Green appeared.

Clips of the film are held by the National Film and Sound Archive. Curator Lynden Barber of Australian Screen Online writes that the film "does not treat the place of Aboriginal people in Australian society as a major theme – though, as subtext, Chris's Aboriginality and his background reflect the relatively high proportion of Aborigines in Australian jails. His relationship with his daughter also demonstrates the importance of extended family amongst Indigenous Australians... Boxing Day remains one of the most compelling Australian features of the mid-to-late 2000s".

=== Accolades ===
Boxing Day was nominated for the FIPRESCI Award and International Feature Award at the Adelaide Film Festival, Best Direction in a Feature film at the Australian Directors Guild's ADG Awards, and IF Awards for Best Acting (Richard Green) and Best Direction. Green won an acting award at the Montréal Festival of New Cinema, with a special mention to Stenders for direction.

It was selected by the ADG for entry to the Directors Guild of America's Directors Finder Series in 2007.

== See also ==
- Cinema of Australia
