= False Witness =

2009 film directed by Peter Andrikidis

- UK DVD cover
- Also known as: The Diplomat
- Genre: Thriller
- Created by: Ronan Glennane; Nell Greenwood; Greg Haddrick
- Written by: Peter Gawler
- Directed by: Peter Andrikidis
- Starring: Dougray Scott; Rachael Blake; Jeremy Lindsay Taylor; Richard Roxburgh; Claire Forlani; Don Hany
- Theme music composer: Burkhard Dallwitz
- Countries of origin: Australia; United Kingdom
- Original language: English
- No. of series: 1
- No. of episodes: 2

Production
- Executive producer: Justin Bodle
- Producer: Peter Andrikidis
- Cinematography: Owen McPolin; Mark Wareham
- Editor: Neil Thumpston
- Running time: 90 minutes
- Production company: Screen Australia

Original release
- Network: UK.TV; BBC HD
- Release: 11 January – 12 January 2009

False Witness, also known as The Diplomat internationally, is a two-part Australian television mini-series, produced by Screentime Australia, and broadcast simultaneously on the Australian subscription television channel UK.TV and BBC HD. Commissioned as part of its required drama output, False Witness was the third in a series of drama commissions by the network in 2008, following Make or Break and Supernova.

Inspired by real events, The Diplomat stars Dougray Scott as Ian Porter, a British diplomat to Tajikistan, who comes under scrutiny from Scotland Yard whilst trying to prevent the sale of a nuclear bomb formerly belonging to the Soviet Union.

The series premiered in Australia on 11 January 2009, with the second episode broadcast the following night. The series also broadcast in the United States on iOn as a four-hour event on 17 January 2009. Despite being co-produced by the BBC, the series was never broadcast on terrestrial television in the United Kingdom, instead being made available on DVD on 14 March 2011 via Showbox Entertainment. The series was, however, broadcast on True Entertainment.

== Cast ==
- Dougray Scott as Ian Porter
- Rachael Blake as Detective Chief Inspector Julie Hales
- Jeremy Lindsay Taylor as Mark Wilson
- Richard Roxburgh as Charles Van Koors
- Claire Forlani as Pippa Porter
- Don Hany as Sergei Krousov
- Jonny Pasvolsky as Antonio Morelli
- Tony Martin as Bill Murray
- Socratis Otto as Shannon Cross
- Stephen Curry as Detective Sergeant Neil Trent
- Alex Menglet as Dimitri
- Shane Briant as Winston Beale
- Costa Ronin as Vladimir
- Christian Clark as Porter lookalike
- Leon Burchill as The Didgeridoo Busker

== Episodes ==
No.	Title	Directed by	Written by	Original release date
1	"Part 1"	Peter Andrikidis	Peter Gawler	11 January 2009
Ian Porter, a British diplomat to Tajikistan, finds himself caught up in a web of espionage and deceit as he tries to prevent the terrorist trade of a nuclear bomb previously belonging to the Soviet Union. When Scotland Yard uncovers Porter's connections to the Russian mafia, the deal is threatened, forcing the terrorists to stop at nothing to get what they want.
2	"Part 2"	Peter Andrikidis	Peter Gawler	12 January 2009
Hundreds of thousands of innocent lives are at stake when the terrorist cell threatens to detonate the nuclear bomb. Hales must discover which side Porter is really on, while the Russian mafia and British agents chase the diplomat themselves.
