= Henry Hacking =

English-born sailor, explorer and colonial enforcer (1750–1831)

- Born: 1750
- Died: 21 July 1831 (aged 80–81); Hobart Town, Van Diemen's Land
- Occupations: seaman and explorer
- Known for: killing Pemulwuy
- Criminal charges: attempted murder perjury
- Criminal penalty: sentenced to death

Henry Hacking (1750 – 21 July 1831) was an English-born sailor and explorer who was one of the first British colonists in New South Wales. He is generally regarded as being the person responsible for shooting and killing the Aboriginal warrior Pemulwuy in 1802.

== Biography ==
Hacking was the quartermaster of Sirius, the flagship of the First Fleet that established the first British colony in New South Wales, Australia in 1788.

He was well regarded as an enforcer by the authorities at the outpost of Sydney and was employed in shooting expeditions to gather food and game for the colony. In September 1789, near Middle Harbour, a group of Cammeraygal men threw a stone at Hacking, who responded by shooting at them, resulting in two being killed or seriously wounded.

Hacking probably returned to England after the loss of the Sirius in 1790, as he returned to Sydney in the Royal Admiral in 1792.

In March 1799, Henry Hacking was ordered by Governor John Hunter to investigate claims of British sailors being trapped by Aboriginal Australians at the mouth of the Hunter River to the north of the colony. Hacking encountered a group of Awabakal people on the south side of the river, who informed him that the sailors had left earlier on foot, endeavouring to walk back to Sydney. Hacking did not believe them, and became agitated, shooting dead three Awabakal men. The sailors in question later arrived in Sydney, having walked the distance to return.

Hacking led many hunting expeditions to supplement meat rations for Australia's first settlers. He was among the party that found the lost government cattle at Cowpastures in 1795. He was sentenced to be transported to Norfolk Island in October 1799 for perjury but received a pardon.

In 1800 and 1801, he piloted the Porpoise into and out of Port Jackson. In 1802, he was appointed first mate of the Lady Nelson. In 1802, Hacking shot and killed Pemulwuy, a Bediagal resistance fighter who had killed and harassed settlers and who had been a wanted man since 1790, after Governor Philip Gidley King issued an order on 22 November 1801 to bring Pemulwuy in dead or alive, with an associated reward.

In 1802, Hacking also shot and wounded Ann Holmes, his former mistress, for which crime he was sentenced to death but pardoned in 1803. Also in 1803, he was found guilty of stealing naval stores from Investigator and again sentenced to death, then reprieved on condition that he was transported to Van Diemen's Land.

In 1804, Hacking was appointed coxswain to the lieutenant-governor at Hobart. In July 1806, he was appointed pilot at Hobart at £50 a year. He died at Hobart on 21 July 1831.

== Legacy ==
Port Hacking, south of Botany Bay, known as Deeban by traditional owners, was named in his honour by Matthew Flinders in 1796.
