= Redfern Now =

2012–2015 Australian drama TV series

- Genre: Drama
- Written by: Jon Bell; Wayne Blair; Michelle Blanchard; Danielle MacLean; Steven McGregor; Leah Purcell; Adrian Russell Wills
- Directed by: Rachel Perkins; Wayne Blair; Leah Purcell; Catriona McKenzie; Adrian Russell Wills; Beck Cole
- Starring: Jimi Bani; Wayne Blair; Dean Daley-Jones; Rarriwuy Hick; Johnny Lever; Deborah Mailman; Marley Sharp; Kelton Pell; Leah Purcell; Tessa Rose; Shari Sebbens; Miranda Tapsell
- Opening theme: "Lonely Child" by Kira Puru
- Country of origin: Australia
- Original language: English
- No. of series: 2 + 1 telemovie
- No. of episodes: 13

Production
- Executive producers: Erica Glynn; Sally Riley
- Producers: Darren Dale; Miranda Dear
- Production locations: Redfern, Sydney, Australia
- Cinematography: Mark Wareham; Jules O'Loughlin
- Editors: Dany Cooper; Nicholas Holmes
- Running time: 60 minutes
- Production company: Blackfella Films

Original release
- Network: ABC
- Release: 1 November 2012 – 9 April 2015

Redfern Now is an Australian drama television series featuring the lives of Aboriginal Australian families living in Redfern, Sydney, that first aired on ABC in 2012. A second season followed in 2013, and the series concluded with a feature-length telemovie, Redfern Now: Promise Me, in April 2015. The series' release contributed to widespread public debate surrounding Indigenous representation in the Australian media, and both series as well as the film were nominated for and won many awards.

== Synopsis ==
The series follows the lives of six families living in the inner Sydney suburb of Redfern, and provides insight into contemporary issues facing Aboriginal Australians. These issues include lack of employment and mental illness, which are posited as direct ramifications of the colonisation of Australia and the Stolen Generations caused by forced removals of Indigenous children. Produced by Blackfella Films as part of the ABC's Indigenous Department, the show is the first series to be commissioned, written, acted, and produced by Indigenous Australians.

== Cast ==
- Wayne Blair as Constable Aaron Davis (2012–2015)
- Dean Daley-Jones as Indigo (2012–2015)
- Deborah Mailman as Lorraine Blake (2012–2015)
- Richard Green as Nathan (2012–2015)
- Lisa Flanagan as Allie (2012–2015)
- Kelton Pell as Raymond (2012–2015)
- Rarriwuy Hick as Robyn Davis (2012–2015)
- Kirk Page as Peter (2013–2015)
- Leah Purcell as Grace Nielson (2012–2013)
- Tessa Rose as Coral (2012–2013)
- Shari Sebbens as Julie (2012)
- Miranda Tapsell as Teneka (2012)
- Rhimi Johnson Page as Danny Blain (2012)
- Ursula Yovich as Nic Shields (2012–2013)
- Marley Sharp as Eddie Shields (2012–2013)
- Aaron McGrath as Joel "Joely" Shields (2012–2013)
- Madeleine Madden as Chloe (2012–2013)
- Stephen Curry as Constable Ryan Hobbs (2012–2013)
- Trisha Morton-Thomas as Aunty Mona (2012–2013)
- Oscar Redding as Richard (2013)
- Craig McLachlan as Jack (2013)
- Ernie Dingo as Ernie Johnson (2013)
- Steve Bisley as Richard (2013)
- Meyne Wyatt as Justin Myles (2013)
- Tammy Clarkson Jones as Mattie Erica Collinson (2013)

=== Guests ===
- Bob Baines as Supt Giles / Inspector Giles (2 episodes)
- Danny Adcock as Foreman (1 episode)
- Elaine Crombie as Evelyn (1 episode)
- Ewen Leslie as Mr Parish (2 episodes)
- Jimi Bani as Peter Gibson (1 episode)
- Josef Ber as Luis (1 episode)
- Lani Tupu as Minister (1 episode)
- Leon Burchill as Frankie (1 episode)
- Nathan Page as Homicide Detective (1 episode)
- Ryan Corr as Timmy (2 episodes)
- Shareena Clanton as Lilly (1 episode)
- Steve Bisley as Richard (1 episode)
- Tony Briggs as Paul Maccoy (1 episode)
- Ursula Yovich as Nic Shields (2 episodes)

== Series overview ==
Series	Episodes	Originally released	
Series	Episodes	First released	Last released
1	6	1 November 2012	6 December 2012
2	6	31 October 2013	5 December 2013
Telemovie		9 April 2015	

== Episodes ==
=== Season 1 ===
No. overall	No. in season	Title	Directed by	Written by	Original release date	Australian viewers
1	1	"Family"	Catriona McKenzie	Danielle MacLean	1 November 2012	721,000
Grace (Leah Purcell) and Wesley (Alec Doomadgee) haven't had a holiday for years – with two kids and Wesley's work, there hasn't been time. Now ready to go, Grace discovers that her sister is off her meds and unable to look after her children so Grace has to find temporary care for the children, but nobody wants to care for them.
2	2	"Joyride"	Catriona McKenzie	Michelle Blanchard	8 November 2012	644,000
In her mid fifties, Coral (Tessa Rose), works in a food van, which sometimes brings her into contact with victims of abuse, leading her to the mistaken conclusion that her daughter's bruised face is the result of more than just an accident. When Coral is hit by a stolen car (the joyride) with Danny as a passenger, her granddaughter, Julie, arrives to look after her, but she is forced into hospital. Danny comes seeking forgiveness and falls in love with Julie.
3	3	"Raymond"	Wayne Blair	Adrian Russell Wills	15 November 2012	654,000
Raymond (Kelton Pell) and Lorraine (Deborah Mailman) have it pretty sweet – house, four kids and Raymond has been nominated for an award for his services to community. But Raymond's celebrity has put him under scrutiny and he is investigated for unduly claiming benefits. Someone may have dobbed him in, but the question is who?
4	4	"Stand Up"	Rachel Perkins	Steven McGregor	22 November 2012	620,000
Sixteen-year-old Joel Shields (Aaron McGrath) has just won an Indigenous scholarship to Clifton Grammar School – one of Sydney's most elite private schools. However, things get complicated when he is forced to sit down for what he believes in.
5	5	"Sweet Spot"	Leah Purcell	Jon Bell	29 November 2012	560,000
Indigo (Dean Daley-Jones) is a professional boxer so he knows how to hit a man, how to land the perfect punch, how to find the sweet spot, but also how to recognise a sweet spot when he has found it.
6	6	"Pretty Boy Blue"	Rachel Perkins	Steven McGregor	6 December 2012	603,000
Aaron Davis (Wayne Blair) is proud of his police uniform, proud of the community in which he works and very proud of his daughter Robyn (Rarriwuy Hick) and his 3 year old granddaughter Donna. What happens when he loses pride in himself and what does he have to do to find his way again?

=== Season 2 ===
No. overall	No. in season	Title	Directed by	Written by	Original release date	Australian viewers
7	1	"Where The Heart Is"	Adrian Russell Wills	Adrian Russell Wills	31 October 2013	604,000
When a freak accident takes the life of his partner Richard, Peter (Kirk Page) has to fight Richard's mother (Noni Hazlehurst) to keep custody of their daughter.
8	2	"Starting Over"	Rachel Perkins	Jon Bell	7 November 2013	529,000
Aaron Davis's (Wayne Blair) career in the force is on hold since an Aboriginal teenager died in police custody on his shift, but his life changes when he begins a relationship with a neighbour (Lisa Flanagan).
9	3	"Babe in Arms"	Adrian Russell Wills	Steven McGregor	14 November 2013	449,000
New parents, Janine (Caren Pistorius) and Justin (Meyne Wyatt) are tested to their limit when their newborn son goes missing and suspicions grow in the community and then between one another.
10	4	"Consequences"	Leah Purcell	Leah Purcell	21 November 2013	478,000
Mattie (Tammy Clarkson Jones) races to share the news of her PhD with her estranged white father Jack (Craig McLachlan) – who she hasn't seen in 19 years – only to find he has died days earlier.
11	5	"Pokies"	Beck Cole	Steven McGregor	28 November 2013	469,000
Nic Shields (Ursula Yovich) spends her lunchtimes playing the pokies, and in a desperate attempt to absolve a whirlpool of deceit and debt she has found herself in, stages a robbery.
12	6	"Dogs of War"	Wayne Blair	Wayne Blair	5 December 2013	483,000
The purchase of an undisciplined guard dog poisons relationships between Redfern neighbours and aggravates a malignant memory for ex-serviceman Ernie (Ernie Dingo).

=== Telemovie ===
No. overall	No. in season	Title	Directed by	Written by	Original release date	Australian viewers
13	1	"Redfern Now: Promise Me" (Telemovie)	Rachel Perkins	Steven McGregor	9 April 2015	455,000
When a young Aboriginal woman is raped and doesn't report it, it has consequences she never could have imagined.

DVD cover

== Background and production ==
The ABC's Indigenous Department was founded in 2010, and headed by Aboriginal film-maker and producer Sally Riley. As director of the department, Riley aimed to create content which advocated for Aboriginal self-representation, and allowed for increased participation of Indigenous creatives in the media industry. Initial success for the department was achieved through the production of the shows First Australians and Mabo. Redfern Now took two years for the department to produce, and created more than 250 jobs for Indigenous people in the filmmaking industry.

Sally Riley called upon British screenwriter Jimmy McGovern to work on this series. McGovern's previous work, which featured gritty realism and suburban life, was similar to what Riley envisioned for Redfern Now. While he was unfamiliar with Aboriginal culture, McGovern was experienced in working with marginalised communities in Britain and Ireland. The Indigenous Department of the ABC had originally aimed to create an Aboriginal spin-off of a series that McGovern has previously worked on called The Street. However, purchasing the rights to recreate the series proved too costly for the department, and so Riley and McGovern came up with the idea for Redfern Now.

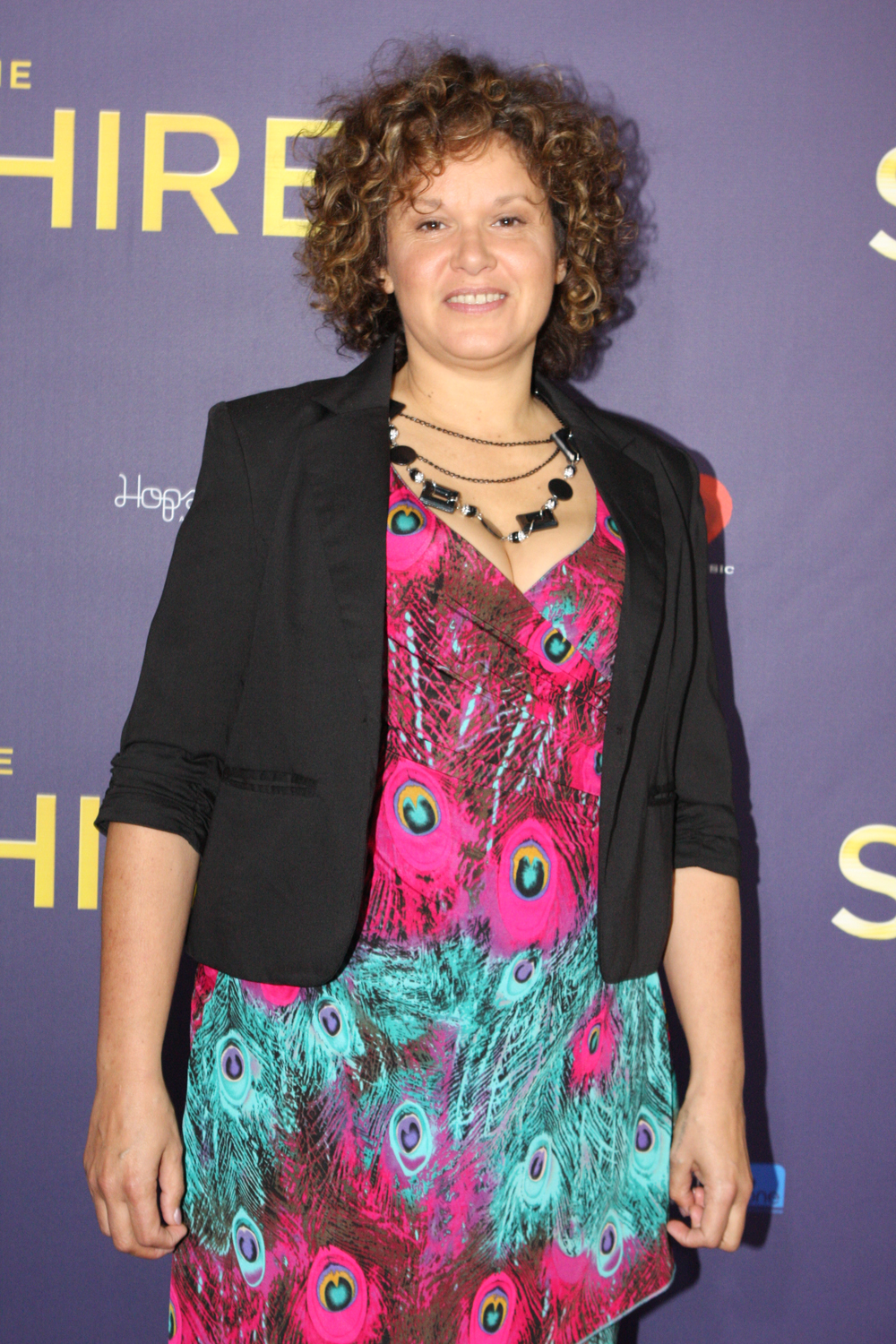
Leah Purcell, who worked alongside Jimmy McGovern in the screenwriting process

The screenwriting process itself took place over nine months, as McGovern workshopped with five Aboriginal writers. The series was based on truth according to McGovern who said, 'the actual writing was their responsibility totally. But the shaping of the story we did together.' It was vital to him that the series was not another documentary style history or autobiography that audiences had already seen on television. With little technical experience in screenwriting, key producer and writer Leah Purcell stated that McGovern's blunt feedback was 'absolutely what we needed'.

Redfern Now was directed by a group of experienced Aboriginal people in the industry including Rachel Perkins, Catriona McKenzie and Leah Purcell. Wayne Blair, the director of award-winning Australian film The Sapphires, was a particularly notable director involved in Redfern Now. Blackfella Films, which produced Redfern Now, was established in 1992 by Rachel Perkins and her then business partner Michael Riley. The organisation focuses a collaborative, ground- up approach to film and television making. The current managing director of Blackfella Films is Darren Dale.

=== Setting ===
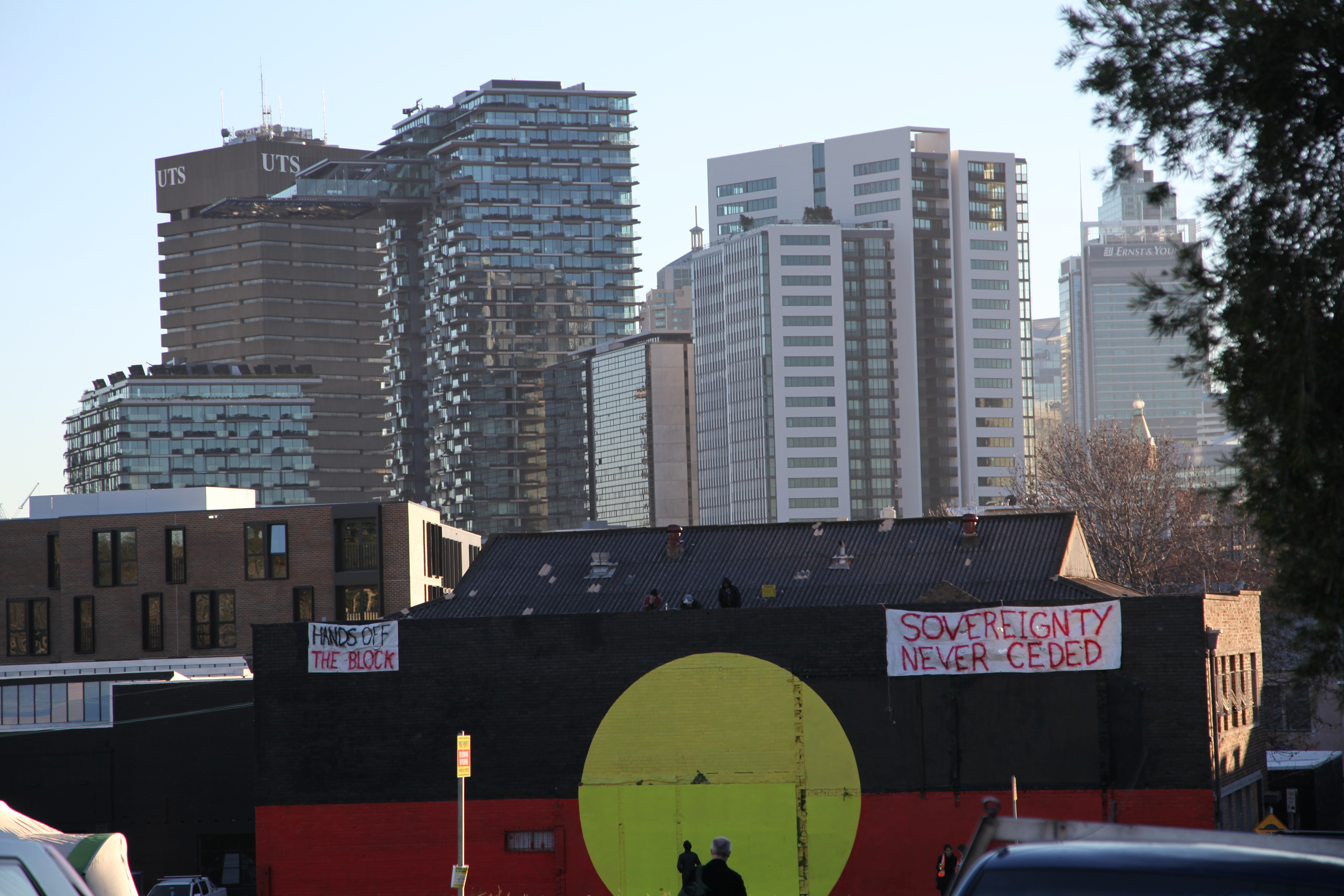
Redfern as part of the urban Sydney city landscape

Inner city suburb Redfern was an automatic choice as the setting for this ABC series. Today it is a dynamic and vibrant place which holds great cultural significance for the Aboriginal community.

Since the 1960s Redfern has been a site for Aboriginal activism and political attention. Redfern is widely recognised as the location of then Prime Minister Paul Keating's 'Redfern Speech' in 1992. This event marked the Australian government's first public acknowledgement of the dispossession of Aboriginal people and the need for reconciliation. Redfern is also near the landing place of the first European settlers in Sydney, and thus is a relevant location to be considering the impacts of colonialism on Indigenous people.

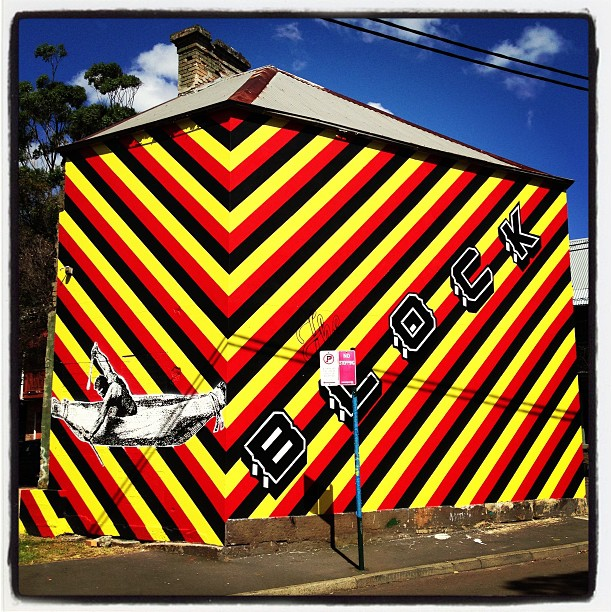
The Block, Redfern

"The Block" is a particular group of houses in Redfern owned by the Aboriginal Housing Company, and is recognisable as the venue of the 2004 youth riots for Aboriginal rights. It is the main location in Redfern Now.

Despite its tumultuous history, Sally Riley said Redfern is now a positive place. It has a strong Aboriginal culture, which is clear in the Indigenous art that marks the streets and parks in the suburb. Aboriginal communities put a lot of important on place, and due to the long history of Indigenous people in Redfern, it now constitutes a place of belonging for many individuals.

=== Theme song ===
Each episode opens with the song "Lonely Child", performed by Indigenous Australian musician Kira Puru, and The Bruise. The lyrics of the sombre song, 'reach out and touch me, take my hand, and walk me home', reflect dominant aspects of the storyline such as decolonisation. The lyrics aimed to pose an atmosphere of openness for audiences, which could invite participation between Aboriginal and non-aboriginal Australian's in the process of healing.

== Themes, storyline, and character ==
Each episode of the series introduces new characters and explores a different social or political issue that faces Aboriginal families in urban Australia. Every episode is able to be viewed discretely, without having seen other parts of the series. While the storylines do examine the disparities between Aboriginal and non-Aboriginal Australians, Redfern Now is a fictional series that focuses on character journeys, rather than a documentary.

Police officer Aaron Davis, played by Wayne Blair, is the only character to appear in multiple episodes throughout the series. He encapsulates the distress that many Indigenous people experience, due to the disparity that exists between representing the needs of their Aboriginal community while also trying to abide by white cultural norms. He has "one foot in Redfern and one foot in the outside world", according to Susanna Nelson in Metro Magazine (2014). The series is relevant in exploring the ongoing debate within urban Aboriginal communities, centring around who can be classified as Aboriginal and who cannot be. This is salient in relation to character Julie, played by Shari Sebbens. The character is complimented on not looking Aboriginal, despite living with her Indigenous family in Redfern.

Despite these dark and confronting storylines, the series is interspersed with intentional moments of humour. According to screenwriter McGovern, these are essential to keeping the viewer engaged in content that could so easily become alienating. The comedic side of the show stems from Aboriginal culture, where people are intent of finding 'humour in adversity'.

=== Aboriginal representation in film and television ===
Redfern Now has been called "groundbreaking", because of how it confronts the historical way that Aboriginality has been defined on television.

Australia's distinct colonial history means that representations of Aboriginal people on television screens have traditionally been distorted and tokenistic, and contributed to perpetuating racist cultural stereotypes. This results from non-Aboriginal people historically being positioned behind the camera as storywriters, producers and directors, who objectify Aboriginal actors in front of the camera. There has been a clear distinction between the authors and subjects of creative works.

The concept of Aboriginality itself is a dynamic "social thing", that is shaped through intercultural experiences and dialogue between non-indigenous and Indigenous Australians. As Aboriginal scholar Marcia Langton suggests, the predominant interactions that non-aboriginal audiences have with Aboriginal people is through what they observe on television. So, it is essential that these representations are authentic and do not convey colonial tropes.

The 1991 National Inquiry into Racist Violence, conducted by the Human Rights and Equal Opportunity Commission, expressed concerns about the lack of diversity on Australian screens and encouraged increased recruitment of Indigenous people in the media industry. Since then, representation has improved so that while Aboriginal people make up 3% of the Australian population, they make up 5% of people in Australian television dramas. Departments such as the government funded Screen Australia, and the ABC's Indigenous Department, have been dedicated to leading the way in improving diverse representation.

Redfern Now is centred around an Aboriginal community, as opposed to previous representations on television where Aboriginal people are cast as the friend or supporting actor. Aboriginal directors, producers and writers worked on the series, meaning that characters could 'play roles written by black writers for black characters, not for them '. Scholar Felicity Collins believes that it is these genuine representations which create an atmosphere of openness, that allow for audience engagement in the process of intercultural dialogue.

Since Redfern Now, the ABC's Indigenous department have created other comedies and dramas of a similar nature. Shows like The Gods of Wheat Street (2014), Black Comedy (2014), 8MMM (2015), and Cleverman (2016) were inspired by the success of Redfern Now.

== Broadcast ==
The first season went to air in 2012 on ABC1. A second season was commissioned in late 2012 and went into production in May 2013, premiering 31 October 2013.

The series concluded with a telemovie titled Redfern Now: Promise Me, directed by Rachel Perkins, which aired on 9 April 2015.

The series was bought by Netflix for certain regions. It has resonated with international audiences, being sold to France Televisions.

== Reception ==
The series has generally received critical praise. Of the first episode Melinda Houston of The Age said, "It makes for television that works on every level: as an important cultural contribution, as a vehicle for sensational actors, writers, directors and technicians, as a great conversation-starter and as a fabulous piece of drama." Based on the second episode, Bob Ellis writes, "It was very well done indeed, and the mixture, like Obama's Dreams From My Father, of honesty, eloquence and hope, bids fair... for a series outcome that may well be seen, in sum, hereafter, as a classic." After viewing the third episode, the television writer for The Canberra Times writes, "Redfern Now is probably as important as any drama produced this year. This is really mature and clever storytelling with the strangest taste of an old O. Henry morality tale."

Redfern Now received criticism from some conservative commentators. They questioned the shows separation of the identity of Aboriginal people living in urban settings, from the perceived 'authentic' rural Aboriginal identity.

Generally feedback received was overwhelmingly positive, with The Sydney Morning Herald calling the first airing a "landmark moment" for Australian television. Metro Magazine noted that the themes explored did not appear like tokenistic tropes, as they often have on other shows which explore Aboriginal issues. They reviewed that the dark themes only existed in the background, and at the foreground were deep character explorations which assisted in presenting a rich and diverse culture. The show did not appear overly political, because of a greater focus on domestic, emotive scenes.

Luke Buckmaster of The Guardian gave the film 4 out of 5 stars, praising its "superb cast" and saying "the series concludes at the peak of its power".

Graham Blundell, Australian actor and writer, admitted to expecting "something grim and grey in tone" for a series set in Redfern. Instead, he noted in a review that the series was "stylised and quite beautiful to look at". Cinematographers Mark Wareham and Jules O'Loughlin have presented Redfern as a bright, sensory and vibrant place. Attributing to this sense of Redfern as a multidimensional place, is the diverse settings which includes schools, homes, streets, alleys and cafes.

== Awards and nominations ==
The first season received five AACTA Award nominations for 2013, and many other nominations and awards followed.

Both series won an Equity Award for Most Outstanding Performance by an Ensemble in a Drama Series.

Year	Award	Category	Recipients and nominees	Result
2012	ASSG Awards	Best Sound for a Television Drama Series	Series 1, Episode 6 'Pretty Boy Blue' – Wes Chew, Sam Gain Emery, Mick Boraso, Luke Mynott, Blair Slater, Andrew Simmons, Duncan McAllister, Dan Johnston, Robert Mackenzie, Paul "Salty" Brincat, Shanti Burn, Ruth Vance	Won
2013	AACTA Awards	Best Television Drama Series	Redfern Now – Darren Dale and Miranda Dear	Nominated
2013	AACTA Awards	Best Screenplay in Television	Series 1, Episode 6 'Pretty Boy Blue' – Steven McGregor	Won
2013	AACTA Awards	Best Lead Actress in a Television Drama	Leah Purcell	Won
2013	AACTA Awards	Best Guest or Supporting Actor in a Television Drama	Luke Carroll	Nominated
2013	AACTA Awards	Best Guest or Supporting Actress in a Television Drama	Shareena Clanton	Nominated
2013	Logie Awards	Most Popular Actress	Deborah Mailman	Nominated
2013	Logie Awards	Most Outstanding Drama Series	Redfern Now	Won
2013	Logie Awards	Most Outstanding Actress	Leah Purcell	Nominated
2013	Logie Awards	Graham Kennedy Award for Most Outstanding New Talent	Shari Sebbens	Won
2013	Deadly Awards	TV show of the Year	Redfern Now	Won
2013	Deadly Awards	Male Actor of the Year	Luke Carroll	Won
2013	Deadly Awards	Female Actor of the Year	Deborah Mailman	Won
2013	ADG Awards	Best Direction in a TV Drama Series	Series 1, Episode 6 'Pretty Boy Blue' – Rachel Perkins	Won
2013	ASE Awards	Best Editing in Television Drama	Redfern Now – Series 1, Episode 1 'Family' – Dany Cooper ASE	Nominated
2013	ASE Awards	Best Editing in Television Drama	Redfern Now – Series 1, Episode 6 'Pretty Boy Blue' – Nicholas Holmes ASE	Nominated
2013	NSW/ACT ACS Awards	John Bowring ACS TV Station Breaks / Promos – Gold Medal	Redfern Now – Titles – Tom Gleeson	Won
2013	Australian Screen Music Awards	Best Music for a Television Series or Serials	Redfern Now – Series 1, Episode 4 'Stand Up' – David McCormack and Antony Partos	Won
2013	Australian Screen Music Awards	Best Television Theme	Redfern Now – David McCormack and Antony Partos	Nominated
2013	Australian Screen Music Awards	Best Original Song Composed for the Screen	Lonely Child from 'Redfern Now' – David McCormack and Antony Partos	Won
2014	ACS Awards	John Bowring ACS TV Station Breaks / Promos – Golden Tripod	Redfern Now – Titles – Tom Gleeson	Won
2014	AACTA Awards	Best Television Drama Series	Redfern Now – Series 2 – Darren Dale and Miranda Dear	Won
2014	AACTA Awards	Best Screenplay in Television	Series 2, Episode 3 'Babe in Arms' – Steven McGregor	Nominated
2014	AACTA Awards	Best Cinematography in Television	Series 2, Episode 6 'Dogs of War' – Jules O'Loughlin ACS	Nominated
2014	AACTA Awards	Best Editing in Television	Series 2, Episode 6 'Dogs of War' – Dany Cooper ASE	Nominated
2014	AACTA Awards	Best Sound in Television	Series 2, Episode 3 'Babes in Arms' – Grant Shepherd, Wes Chew, Robert Mackenzie, Tom Herdman & Sam Gain-Emery	Nominated
2014	AACTA Awards	Best Original Music Score in Television	Series 2, Episode 3 'Babe in Arms' – Antony Partos	Won
2014	AACTA Awards	Best Lead Actor in a Television Drama	Ernie Dingo	Nominated
2014	AACTA Awards	Best Lead Actor in a Television Drama	Meyne Wyatt	Nominated
2014	Logie Awards	Most Outstanding Drama Series	Redfern Now	Won
2014	Logie Awards	Most Outstanding Actor	Kirk Page	Nominated
2014	Logie Awards	Graham Kennedy Award for Most Outstanding New Talent	Meyne Wyatt	Nominated
2014	Logie Awards	Most Popular New Talent	Caren Pistorius	Nominated
2014	ASE Awards	Best Editing in Television Drama	Redfern Now – Series 2, Episode 1 'Where The Heart Is' – Nicholas Holmes ASE	Won
2014	Australian Screen Music Awards	Best Music for a Television Series or Serial	Redfern Now – Series 2, Episode 3 'Babe in Arms' – Antony Partos	Nominated
2014	APDG Awards	Design on a Television Drama	Redfern Now – Felicity Abbott (Production Designer) Design Team: Loretta Cosgrove (Art Director), Christian Petersen (Set Decorator), Peter Malatesta (Property Master), Michael Kissane (Standby Props), Zuzia Buszewicz (Buyer/Dresser). Highly Commended	Nominated
2015	AACTA Awards	Best Lead Actor in a Television Drama	Wayne Blair	Nominated
2015	AACTA Awards	Best Lead Actress in a Television Drama	Deborah Mailman	Nominated
2015	AACTA Awards	Best Guest or Supporting Actress in a Television Drama	Rarriwuy Hick	Nominated
2015	AACTA Awards	Best Cinematography in Television	'Promise Me' – Mark Wareham ACS	Nominated
2015	AACTA Awards	Best Editing in Television	'Promise Me' – Nicholas Holmes ASE	Won
2015	AACTA Awards	Best Sound in Television	'Promise Me' – Rainier Davenport, Ian McLoughlin CAS, Wes Chew, Tom Herdman, Annie Breslin & Blair Slater	Nominated
2015	AACTA Awards	Best Original Music Score in Television	'Promise Me' – Antony Partos	Nominated
2015	ASE Awards	Best Editing in Television Drama	'Promise Me' – Nicholas Holmes ASE	Nominated
2015	Australian Screen Music Awards	Best Music for a Mini-Series or Telemovie	Redfern Now – Antony Partos	Nominated
2015	APDG Awards	Production Design on a Television Drama	'Promise Me' – Felicity Abbott APDG	Nominated
2015	ASSG Awards	Best Sound for a Tele Feature	'Promise Me' – Wes Chew, Luke Mynott, Ian Mcloughlin, Tom Herdman, Annie Breslin, Sam Gain-Emery, Ryan Millard, Dan Johnston, Duncan Mcallister, Blair Slater, Tom Pastro, Ranier Davenport, Sam Davis and Paradox Delilah	Nominated
2016	Logie Awards	Most Outstanding Actress	Deborah Mailman	Won
2016	Logie Awards	Most Outstanding Supporting Actress	Rarriwuy Hick	Nominated

== See also ==
- Blackstone, a Canadian television program with a similar theme
