= Eric Willmot =

Australian scholar, educator, and engineer (1936–2019)

Eric Willmot AM
- Born: 31 January 1936; Queensland, Australia
- Died: 20 April 2019 (aged 83); Baulkham Hills, New South Wales, Australia

Academic background
- Education: University of Newcastle; University of Canberra

Academic work
- Institutions: Australian National University; James Cook University

Eric Paul Willmot AM, (31 January 1936 – 20 April 2019) was an Australian Aboriginal scholar, educator, writer, and engineer.

== Early life and education ==
Eric Paul Willmot was born on 31 January 1936 in Queensland.

He was educated first at various Queensland schools, then obtained his Bachelor of Science and Diploma of Education at the University of Newcastle, in New South Wales.

In 1980 he obtained his Master of Education (Research) in 1980 at the University of Canberra.

== Career ==
After obtaining his Master of Education, Willmot joined the faculty of the Australian National University. At the time he was the first Indigenous principal of the Australian Institute of Aboriginal Studies from 1981 to 1984 (later known as AIATSIS).

Willmot later joined the James Cook University as Professor of Education.

He retired from public administration in 1994 to then do engineering research in private enterprise. He spent a lot of time in his shed working on his inventions, but few ever made it to market as (in the words of his daughter, Haidi), he "was not a businessman".

Other positions held by Willmot included Director of Research at the ANU, Deputy Secretary of the Department of Aboriginal Affairs, and Chief Education Officer in the ACT Department of Education.

He wrote Pemulwuy, The Rainbow Warrior, a novel about Pemulwuy's resistance to colonialism. According to his daughter Haidi, writing was "his joy, his passion, and his escape".

== Personal life and death ==
Willmot married twice. He had four children with his first wife. He met his second wife in Papua New Guinea in the 1970s, and had a daughter, Haidi, with her, and the family spent some time in Vanuatu.

He died at Baulkham Hills, New South Wales on 20 April 2019.

== Honours and awards ==
- 1981: Australian Inventor of the Year
- 1984: Member of the Order of Australia, for "service to education and in the field of Aboriginal studies"
- 1986: Gave the annual series of Boyer Lectures, titled "Australia: The Last Experiment"
- 1986: Gave the inaugural Frank Archibald Memorial Lecture, titled "Future Pathways: Equity or Isolation"
- 1987: FAW Patricia Weickhardt Award to an Aboriginal Writer
- ?: Winner, Medaille d'Or Genève, by the Salon des Inventions in Geneva, twice, for his invention of a continuously variable-ratio rigid body transmission
