= Tedbury =

Aboriginal resistance fighter (1780–1810)

- Born: c. 1780; Botany Bay, Colony of New South Wales
- Died: c. April 1810; Parramatta, Colony of New South Wales
- Other names: Tidbury, Tjedboro
- Known for: Resistance to the British colonisation of Australia
- Father: Pemulwuy

Tedbury (c. 1780, Botany Bay – 1810, Parramatta), also known as Tidbury and Tjedboro, was a Bidjigal warrior of the Dharug Aboriginal Australian people involved in frequent acts of resistance to British colonists in the early years of New South Wales. He was the son of noted warrior and rebel Pemulwuy.

Tedbury was captured in 1805 and tried before the magistrate at Parramatta, Reverend Samuel Marsden. He was released at the behest of Aboriginal Australians who had participated in the capture of Musquito.

Tedbury was an ally of John Macarthur and a frequent visitor to Elizabeth Farm. When Governor Bligh placed Macarthur under arrest in 1808, Tedbury offered to spear the governor.

He also took part in a robbery of a traveller named Tunks on Parramatta Road in 1809. The local newspaper reported at the time:

The son appears to have inherited the ferocity and vices of his father : Upon the above occasion he pointed his spear to the head and breast of Tunks, and repeatedly threatened to plunge the weapon into him; but other persons fortunately appearing in sight, the assailants betook to the woods. Several other such attacks have been made, but as Tedbury is stated to have always been of the party, which consisted; but of two or three, it may be inferred that a spirit of malevolence is far from general; and under this belief, it may be hoped the settlers will not permit their servants or families to practice unnecessary severities which may irritate, and provoke those who are at present peaceably disposed, to join in the atrocities of a few miscreants, whom their own tribes, if not exasperated by ill treatment, would no doubt as they have frequently done before, betray into our hands, and avowedly assist in apprehending.

== Bond farm attack ==
Tedbury also took part in an attack on a settler's farm owned by Thomas Bond at Georges River on 26 September 1809. According to a contemporary report:

A number of natives assembled about the farm... and behaved in a very outrageous manner. They manifested an inclination to plunder, but were prevented by the determination that was shewn to resist them. They threw several spears, one of which grazed the ear of Mr. F. Meredith, who assisted in the defence of the place, which it was at length found necessary to abandon.

Tedbury was then involved in a theft of a flock of sheep belonging to Edward Powell of Parramatta Road, Canterbury. Powell and some men tried to track down the thieves but they escaped, although some of the sheep were recovered.

== Death ==
On 19 February 1810, Tedbury, in full view of witnesses, threw a spear at the sister of Edward Luttrell, in the garden of her house at Parramatta. Edward shot him in the upper lip and notwithstanding treatment the next day from the Assistant Surgeon at Hawkesbury, after at least some weeks he died of his wounds. Luttrell was charged with assault and acquitted on 10 March 1810, Tedbury being still alive at the time. Edward's brother Robert Burgess Luttrell was clubbed to death on 7 November the next year in a reprisal attack by Tedbury's fellow Darug over his breaking of their spears and taking away of their women.
