= Stone Bros. =

- Theatrical release poster
- Directed by: Richard Frankland
- Written by: Richard Frankland; William Bainbridge
- Produced by: Ross Hutchens; Colin South; John Foss
- Starring: Luke Carroll; Leon Burchill; Valentino del Toro; Peter Phelps
- Cinematography: Joseph Pickering
- Edited by: Meredith Watson Jeffery
- Music by: Shane O'Mara
- Release date: 24 September 2009
- Running time: 90 minutes
- Country: Australia
- Language: English
- Budget: $3,400,000
- Box office: $99,032

Stone Bros. (alternatively titled Stoned Bros) is a 2009 Aboriginal Australian stoner comedy film directed by Richard Frankland. It was theatrically released in Australia on 24 September 2009.

== Plot ==
Eddie (Carroll) is working as a cleaner in a museum in Perth, Western Australia, but loses his job because of an accident that sees a series of cardboard cutout images of Australia's Prime Ministers fall down in a domino effect, resulting in an image of John Howard landing on and killing his boss's cat.

When his cousin Charlie (Burchill) trades away Eddie's favourite jacket, he unwittingly loses a sacred stone, entrusted to Eddie by his uncle, which he promised to one day return to its home in Kalgoorlie. This is the final straw, as far as Eddie is concerned, and he sets off to recover the stone and reconnect with his aboriginal roots. Charlie, escaping the wrath of his vengeful girlfriend, forces himself along for the ride, and Eddie's spiritual journey takes a very sharp turn off-track.

Along the way, they pick up what Charlie mistakes for a "hot chick" only to find they are landed with Vinnie (del Torro), a self-described Italian rock star. Soon after they are joined by Eddie and Charlie's transgender cousin Regina (Page), who dreams of making it big on the Koori edition of Australian Idol, and a confused European Australian cop (Phelps) who dreams of going walkabout.

== Cast ==
- Luke Carroll as Eddie
- Leon Burchill as Charlie
- Valentino del Toro as Vinnie (Italian Stallion)
- Peter Phelps as Mark (Prison Guard)
- David Page as Regina
- Luke Hewitt as Barry
- Rohanna Angus as Rhonda
- Jai Courtney as Eric
- Sarah Rachael Olivia Lawrence as Elizabeth
- Shareena Clanton as Leah

== Production ==
The film is widely regarded as the first feature length Aboriginal Australian comedy film. When asked why there were so few Aboriginal comedies, director Richard Frankland stated that:

Essentially we’ve been in a situation where in the early 1990s there were some 10,000 hours of film footage with Aboriginal content or subject matter, and over 90 per cent of that was written, directed and produced by non-indigenous people. So Wal Saunders began the Australian Film Commission's Indigenous Branch in 1993, with the support of Cathy Robinson who was the then CEO. And it went through the roof. That was the renaissance in my opinion of indigenous filmmaking. There have been individuals before who’ve stepped out, but all of a sudden both Warwick Thornton and I did that first [mentored] program, Sand to Celluloid, and now here we are doing feature films. So I think both Cathy and Wal deserve to be commended for what they did. It was absolutely courageous and so needed. It essentially changed the cultural landscape of Australia.

— Richard Frankland

== Reception ==
=== Box office ===
The film was released in Australian cinemas on 24 September 2009 and grossed $24,992 on its opening week in the Australia cinemas. The film ultimately grossed $99,032, making it the 235th highest-grossing film in Australia for 2009.

Director Richard Frankland had originally hoped that teenagers would form a large part of the viewing audience for Stone Bros., however the film received an MA15+ rating, preventing this age group from seeing it at the cinema. This rating was supposedly given due to a deleted scene that involved marijuana buds being cut from a plant.

Stone Bros is certainly not about cultivating drugs or enticing people to use drugs. The drugs in it are a comedic device for the most part but they're also a teaching tool. This film is coming from a marginalised group in society, where there's a high suicide rate that can be attributed directly to drug use, low self-esteem and alcohol abuse. We know that this film if utilised properly can assist a lot of people in stepping out of those areas.

— Richard Frankland, Sydney Morning Herald.

=== Reviews ===
On the review aggregator website Rotten Tomatoes, 88% of 8 critics' reviews are positive.

== Soundtrack ==
1. "The Opening" – Shane O'Mara
2. "Used to Get High" – John Butler Trio
3. "Warriors for Life" – Tjimba and the Yung Warriors
4. "Foxtrot" – Shane O'Mara
5. "Nobody Knows the Trouble I've Seen" – Kay Starr
6. "Pardon My Passion" – Mary G
7. "Triumph" – Shane O'Mara
8. "Dark Wind" – Richard Frankland
9. "Look for Me" – The Charcoal Club
10. "Moonstruck" – Sara Storer
11. "Lonely Guy" – Shane O'Mara
12. "Lets Pretend" – Jack Blanchard & Misty Morgan
13. "Thou Shalt Not Steal" – John Butler Trio
14. "Banjo Boogie" – Shane O'Mara
15. "Asunder" – The Charcoal Club
16. "Last Tear" – The Charcoal Club

== See also ==
- Richard Frankland
- Cinema of Australia
