= The Gods of Wheat Street =

- Genre: Drama
- Created by: Jon Bell
- Written by: Jon Bell
- Directed by: Wayne Blair; Catriona McKenzie; Adrian Russell Wills
- Starring: Kelton Pell; Lisa Flanagan; Shari Sebbens; Rarriwuy Hick; Miah Madden; Ursula Yovich; Mouche Phillips
- Composer: Jeff Lang
- Country of origin: Australia
- Original language: English
- No. of seasons: 1
- No. of episodes: 6

Production
- Executive producers: Deborah Cox; Fiona Eagger; Erica Glynn; Sally Riley
- Producer: Lois Randall
- Production locations: Coraki, NSW, Australia; Lismore, NSW, Australia; Casino, NSW, Australia
- Cinematography: Brendan Lavelle; Murray Lui
- Editors: Suresh Ayyar; Nicholas Beauman
- Running time: 57 minutes
- Production company: Every Cloud Productions

Original release
- Network: ABC
- Release: 12 April – 17 May 2014

The Gods of Wheat Street is an Australian television drama series that screened on ABC TV from 12 April 2014. The six-part series tells the stories of the Freeburn clan, an Australian Aboriginal family.

== Synopsis ==
Odin Freeburn, head of the family, is being pulled in all directions as he tries to keep his family together. Odin has one brother in jail, another brother is in love with the daughter of the family enemy and his wife has run away to the city leaving him to raise their two daughters. To complicate matters, his employer has just died, his sister-in-law is in love with him and the spirit of his mother Eden has come back on a mission to protect the important destiny of the Freeburn family line.

== Cast ==
- Kelton Pell as Odin Freeburn
- Lisa Flanagan as Libby Lavelle
- Shari Sebbens as Isolde Freeburn
- Ursula Yovich as Eden Freeburn
- Mark Coles Smith as Tristan Freeburn
- Bruce Carter as Ares Freeburn
- Hezekiah Roberts as Young Ares Freeburn
- Rarriwuy Hick as Electra Freeburn
- Miah Madden as Athena Freeburn
- Tessa Rose as Teri Lavelle
- David Field as Harry Hamilton
- Millie Samuels as Anastasia Hamilton
- Mouche Phillips as Petra Hamilton
- Alfie Gledhill as Fables
- Lauren Hamilton Neill as Shaz
- Frederick Copperwaite as Jonesy Brown
- Richard Green as Knuckles
- Jack Charles as Old Uncle
- Gregory J Fryer
- Isaiah Smith as Bucky
- Luke Carroll as Wayne
- Riley Nottingham as Constable Craig Woods
- George Whaley

== Production ==
The series is written by Jon Bell, who is also a producer with Lois Randall. Executive producers are Fiona Eagger and Deb Cox from Every Cloud Productions, along with Sally Riley, ABC TV's head of Indigenous Unit. It is directed by Catriona McKenzie, Wayne Blair and Adrian Wills. The show was filmed around Casino and Lismore in Northern New South Wales in late 2012.

== Episodes ==
No.	Title	Directed by	Written by	Original release date
1	"The Obligation"	Catriona McKenzie	Jon Bell	12 April 2014
2	"The Fighting Freeburns"	Catriona McKenzie	Jon Bell	19 April 2014
3	"The Games People Play"	Adrian Russell Wills	Jon Bell	26 April 2014
4	"Nobody Lives Forever"	Adrian Russell Wills	Jon Bell	3 May 2014
5	"The Mighty Are Fallen"	Wayne Blair	Jon Bell	10 May 2014
6	"She Who Supplanted Her Sister"	Wayne Blair	Jon Bell	17 May 2014

== Soundtrack ==
The Gods of Wheat Street

Soundtrack album by Jeff Lang
- Released: 12 May 2014
- Labels: The Gods of Wheat Street, ABC Music

Jeff Lang chronology
Carried in Mind (2012)	The Gods of Wheat Street (2014)	I Live in My Head a Lot These Days (2014)

A soundtrack was recorded, credited to Jeff Lang, and released on 12 May 2014. At the APRA Music Awards of 2014, the title track was nominated for Best Television Theme.

== Track listing ==
1. "The Gods of Wheat Street" - 1:01
2. "Back Where They Belong" - 1:33
3. "Together Again" - 3:05
4. "Three Weeks Till the Auction" - 1:34
5. "Athena in Waiting Room" - 1:15
6. "What Happened to You" - 1:36
7. "Have You Seen Them Fables" - 1:14
8. "Roll Call" - 1:43
9. "One Will Be Born, One Will Die" - 1:46
10. "Saved By the Cavalry" 2:25
11. "Outside Harry's" - 1:20
12. "Do You Like What You See" - 2:46
13. "Smelling the Shirt" - 1:29
14. "The Return of Jonesy Brown" - 0:45
15. "We're Never Going Back" - 2:12
16. "Jonesy in the Workshop" - 1:19
17. "Izzy and the Money" - 1:35
18. "What Am I Getting Wrong" - 1:23
19. "Who Did This Fables" - 2:44
20. "You Mongrel Black Dog" - 1:09
21. "I Deserved That Money" - 1:32
22. "Odin's Accident" - 4:51
23. "Letters In Jail" 1:23
24. "Izzy Rushes for the Post" - 1:55
25. "Electra Grabs the Taser" - 1:22
26. "There's a Surprise Wedding" - 1:43
27. "You're My Strong Boy" - 1:03
28. "What Happens in Court" - 1:23
29. "Rewards Program" - 1:13
30. "Going Once Going Twice" - 2:20
31. "You've Killed Him" - 1:20
32. "If You've Got Something to Say" - 0:59
33. "You Still Here" 1:15
