= The Circuit (TV series) =

- Gary Sweet and Aaron Pedersen
- Genre: Drama
- Created by: Ross Hutchens; Kelly Lefever
- Written by: Kelly Lefever; Dot West; Mitch Torres; Beck Cole
- Directed by: Steve Jodrell; Catriona McKenzie; Richard Frankland; James Bogle; Aaron Pedersen
- Starring: Aaron Pedersen; Kelton Pell; Tammy Clarkson; Marta Kaczmarek; Bill McCluskey; Gary Sweet
- Composer: David Bridie
- Country of origin: Australia
- Original language: English
- No. of seasons: 2
- No. of episodes: 12

Production
- Running time: 53 minutes
- Production company: Media World Pictures

Original release
- Network: SBS
- Release: 8 July 2007 – 5 January 2010

The Circuit is an Australian television drama series, starring Aaron Pedersen and Gary Sweet. The first season aired in 2007 and the second in December 2009 to January 2010.

== Plot ==
The series centres on Aboriginal solicitor Drew Ellis, who joins the district to work at the Kimberley Circuit Court.

== Cast ==
=== Main ===
- Aaron Pedersen as Drew Ellis
- Gary Sweet as Magistrate Peter Lockhart
- Kelton Pell as Sam Wallan
- Tammy Clarkson as Bella Noble
- Marta Kaczmarek as Ellie Zdybicka
- Nick Simpson-Deeks as Archie McMahon
- Leroy Parsons as Clarence Long
- Bill McCluskey as Sergeant Bob Temple

=== Recurring ===
- David Ngoombujarra as Harry Pope
- Everlyn Sampi as Leonie
- Karen Pang as Megan
- Lucia Smyrk as Constable Wilkes
- Mark Coles Smith as Billy Wallan
- Ningali Lawford as Louise
- Tony Briggs as Mick Mathers

=== Guests ===
- Costa Ronin as Karl
- David Field as Kenneth
- Emma Booth as Nicola
- Kris McQuade as Terri Oliver
- Tom E. Lewis as Father
- Tony Bonner as Kenneth
- Trevor Jamieson as Bill

== Release ==
The six-part first season screened on SBS TV, premiering on 8 July 2007 at 9:30 pm, and concluding on 12 August 2007. Season 2 aired from 1 December 2009 through 5 January 2010, ending the series.

== Production ==
Filmed mainly in Broome, Western Australia and surrounding areas, the show had a budget of more than $4 million, and 1,000 local Aboriginal extras were employed for the production.

== Series overview ==
| Series | Episodes | Originally released | |
| Series | Episodes | First released | Last released |
|---|---|---|---|
| 1 | 6 | 8 July 2007 | 12 August 2007 |
| 2 | 6 | 1 December 2009 | 5 January 2010 |

=== Episodes ===
Episode information was retrieved from Australian Television Information Archive.

==== Season 1 (2007) ====
| No. overall | No. in series | Title | Directed by | Written by | Original release date |
|---|---|---|---|---|---|
| 1 | 1 | "It’s a Long Way Home" | Catriona McKenzie | Kelly Lefever | 8 July 2007 |
| 2 | 2 | "In Country" | Richard Frankland | Dot West | 15 July 2007 |
| 3 | 3 | "Deeper Water" | Catriona McKenzie | Mitch Torres | 22 July 2007 |
| 4 | 4 | "Stairway to the Moon" | Steve Jodrell | Beck Cole | 29 July 2007 |
| 5 | 5 | "You Always Hurt the Ones You Love" | Catriona McKenzie | Kelly Lefever | 5 August 2007 |
| 6 | 6 | "Home Is Where the Past Is" | Richard Frankland | Kelly Lefever | 12 August 2007 |

==== Season 2 (2009-10) ====
| No. overall | No. in series | Title | Directed by | Written by | Original release date |
|---|---|---|---|---|---|
| 7 | 1 | "Sorry Business" | Steve Jodrell | Kelly Lefever | 1 December 2009 |
| 8 | 2 | "Reading the Signs" | Steve Jodrell | Dot West | 8 December 2009 |
| 9 | 3 | "The Fallout" | Steve Jodrell | Mitch Torres | 15 December 2009 |
| 10 | 4 | "The Devil You Know" | James Bogle | Kelly Lefever | 22 December 2009 |
| 11 | 5 | "Of Mice and Men" | James Bogle | Wayne Blair | 29 December 2009 |
| 12 | 6 | "Swings and Roundabouts" | Aaron Pedersen | Kelly Lefever | 5 January 2010 |

== Awards ==
The show and cast won and were nominated in several categories at the 2007 AFI Awards, including:

- Winner: Best Guest or Supporting Actor in a Television Drama – David Ngoombujarra
- Nominated: Best Telefeature or Mini Series
- Nominated: Best Direction in Television – Richard Frankland (for episode 'Home Is Where the Past Is')
- Nominated: Best Screenplay in Television – Kelly Lefever (for episode 'Home Is Where the Past Is')
- Nominated: Best Lead Actress – Tammy Clarkson

It also won the following awards:

- 2007: Television Award, 2007 Human Rights Awards, Australia
- 2008: Graham Kennedy Award for Most Outstanding New Talent at the Logies – Tammy Clarkson
- 2009: AWGIE Award for Best Television Mini Series Original (for Season 2)
- 2010: Silver Hugo, Mini Series (for Season 1), Chicago International Film Festival, U.S.
- 2010: Silver Hugo, Best Television Series, Chicago International Film Festival, U.S.
- 2010: Silver Hugo, Mini Series (for Season 2), Chicago International Film Festival, U.S.
- 2010: Australian Directors' Guild Awards Best Direction in Television Drama Mini-series – Steve Jodrell

== See also ==
- List of Australian television series
