= The Silent Years =

The Silent Years are an experimental Pop/Rock project from the Detroit Metropolitan Area. The band is known for combining atmospheric layers of sound and poetic lyrics with popular songwriting sensibilities. Its members are Josh Epstein, Fabian Halabou, Ryan Clancy, Cassandra Verras and Michael Majewski.

== History ==
The Silent Years were formed in 2005 when singer/songwriter Josh Epstein recruited childhood friends Patrick Michalak, Ryan Trager and Jeremy Edwards to work on recording a demo for Lava Records, a subsidiary of Atlantic Records. Since then, the band has become more of a collective with members rotating and guest performers appearing frequently at live performances. The Silent Years tour extensively in North America and the UK. The band is currently signed to Sidecho Records in the United States, Gift Music in the UK, and Moorworks in Japan.

The band's EP, Let Go, was released via Sidecho Records on 14 July 2009.

== Discography ==
- Stand Still Like The Hummingbird EP (2005)
- The Silent Years LP, No Alternative Records (2006)
- The Globe LP, Defend Music (2008)
- The Globe (UK/Japan Edition), Gift Music/Moorworks (2009)
- Let Go EP, Sidecho Records (2009)
