= Catriona McKenzie =

Australian filmmaker

Catriona McKenzie is an Australian filmmaker. She is known for her film Satellite Boy and television series Kiki and Kitty and Wrong Kind of Black. Her production company is called Dark Horse.

== Early life and education ==
Catriona McKenzie is an Aboriginal Australian woman of the Gunai/Kurnai people of south-eastern Australia.

She is a graduate of the Australian Film, Television and Radio School (AFTRS), with one of her graduate films being the short film The Third Note (1999). She graduated with Honours in 2001, and afterwards studied screenwriting at the New York University Tisch School of the Arts.

== Career ==
Satellite Boy (2012) was McKenzie's first feature film, produced by David Jowsey. The film was selected for screening at the Toronto International Film Festival, and earned a Special Mention at its European premiere in the Generation section of the 2013 Berlin Film Festival.

She has also worked on numerous other TV series, including Supernatural, The Walking Dead, Tidelands, Harrow, The Warriors, Dance Academy, The Circuit, Redfern Now and The Gods of Wheat Street. She is the first Indigenous Australian woman to direct a TV series in the US (the supernatural drama Shadowhunters).

In 2018 McKenzie founded her own production company, Dark Horse, which she intended to be a vehicle to provide opportunities for new, diverse voices. She believes that there are hundreds of stories to be told "about the impact of white colonial Australia on Aboriginal culture and Aboriginal people”. The first film is planned to be Stolen, co-written with Patricia Cornelius.

From 2019 and as of 2021 she was working on a feature-length film about Aboriginal warrior Pemulwuy, working title Pemulwuy: The Movie, written by Jon Bell. The filmmakers consulted with Uncles Richard Green, Vic Simms, and Colin Isaacs, as local community elders in Sydney. Philip Noyce, as executive producer, travelled from Los Angeles, along with McKenzie, in August 2019 to meet the elders. The film began production in 2021.

== Other roles and activities ==
McKenzie was appointed as a Film and Television Industry Advisory Committee Member under Screen NSW's Sydney City of Film initiative, initially until 31 December 2019, and then reappointed to 31 December 2022.

She is a member of the Directors Guild of America.

== Recognition and awards ==
Satellite Boy was nominated for the AACTA Award for Best Film, and in 2014 was selected by the Australian Directors Guild for entry to the Directors Guild of America's Directors Finder Series.

The comedy series Kiki and Kitty, written by Nakkiah Lui and directed by McKenzie, won two awards at Series Mania in France in 2018.
