= Dot West =

Indigenous Australian screenwriter

- Born: Dorothy Henry; Western Australia
- Occupation: screenwriter

Dot West is an Indigenous Australian screenwriter.

== Education ==
West qualified with a Bachelor of Arts in Media Studies in 1998.

== Career ==
West is a freelance scriptwriter, accredited trainer and consultant, and also serves on Screenwest's Industry Advisory Group and WA's Screen Industry Diversity and Inclusion leadership group.

West has served as a board member in various organisations including the Inaugural Vice Chairperson of NITV, Screenwest, Australian International Documentary Conference, the National Indigenous Radio Service. West is a non-Executive Director of SBS, Director of Goolarri Media Enterprises and Ramu Productions in Broome and the Chairperson of First Nations Media Australia.

In 1993, West delivered one of the annual series of Australian Broadcasting Corporation's Boyer Lectures called "Voices of the Land".

== Personal ==
Dot West was born Dorothy Henry, a Noongar woman from Western Australia's south west.

== Honours and awards ==
- 2005 Tudawali Award
- 2008 WASA for "Outstanding Contribution to the WA Screen Industry"
- 2014 Honorary Doctorate from Swinburne University of Technology
- 2009 AWGIE Award for her work on The Circuit
- 2019 First Nations Media Lifetime Achievement Award
