= Australian Production Design Guild =

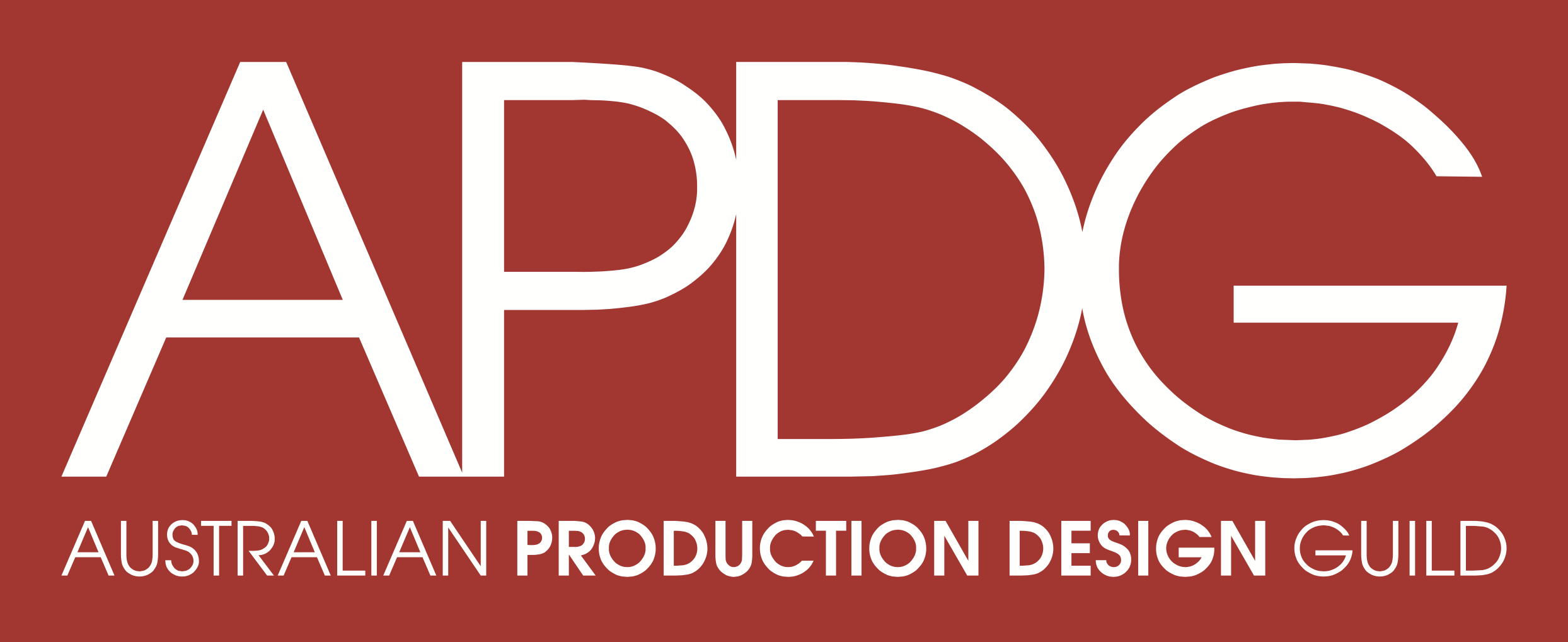
- Logo of the Australian Production Design Guild
- Abbreviation: APDG
- Formation: 2009; 17 years ago
- Type: Guild
- Headquarters: Sydney, Australia
- President: George Liddle
- Website: apdg.org.au

The Australian Production Design Guild was established in 2009 as a non-profit organisation that aims to:

• Represent designers and their associates in screen, live performance, events and digital production across Australia.
• Recognise and nurture excellence in design through awards, mentoring and accreditation.
• Raise the profile of stage and screen design and facilitate a vibrant design community.

The guild is headquartered in Sydney.

== Awards ==
The guild recognises people working in the Australian production design industry. Members of the guild nominate work they completed in the previous year. The nominations are judged by a judging panel.

The guild offers awards for best production design, best visual effect and a members' choice award.

The 2018 awards included over 20 categories and winners.
