= Jon Bell (filmmaker) =

Australian filmmaker

Jon Bell is an Aboriginal Australian screenwriter and director. He is known for his work on many television series, including The Gods of Wheat Street, Redfern Now and Cleverman; many short films; and for his debut feature film, The Moogai, released in 2024.

== Early life ==
Jon Bell's father was from the town of Peak Hill, in New South Wales. Bell is a Wiradjuri, Bundjalung, and Yaegl man.

== Career ==
Bell has written extensively for television. His 2015 children's television Ready for This earned international recognition. He created and wrote the drama series The Gods of Wheat Street, and wrote for both seasons of the acclaimed drama series Redfern Now, in 2013 and 2015. Other television credits include Cleverman (2016) The Warriors (2017). He also wrote an episode of the award-winning series RFDS in 2021.

Bell has written a number of short films, including And Justice for One (2003); Two Big Boys (2007); The Chuck In (2013), which screened at the Sydney Film Festival and the imagineNATIVE Film and Media Arts Festival in Toronto; The Moogai (2020; made as a proof of concept); and Jarli (2021), which he wrote for Like a Photon. The Moogai premiered at South by Southwest (SXSW) in the US.

In 2023, he was writing a script for a film about Aboriginal warrior and leader Pemulwuy for That's-A-Wrap Productions, with Stan Grant and Phillip Noyce as executive producers, In 2024, it was announced that Warwick Thornton had boarded a project to create a biopic about Pemulwuy titled First Warrior, with Andrew Dillon (of That's‑A‑Wrap Productions) producing and co-writing with Bell.

The horror film The Moogai, released in 2024, was Bell's first feature film as a writer. Developed from his earlier short film of the same name released in 2020, the film explores themes including racism, post-natal depression, transgenerational trauma to the Stolen Generations. The film features an evil spirit ("Moogai" is a Bundjalung word meaning "bad spirit", similar to "boogie man", or Featherfoot) that takes children from their parents. Bell said, about his short film, that psychological horror was "the best fit to resemble the difficulty Aboriginal people have faced in the past and are facing due to the ongoing effects of colonisation". It had its Australian premiere at Sydney Film Festival and its global premiere at Sundance.

== Recognition and awards ==
The Gods of Wheat Street won a Screen Producers Award for Mini-Series of the Year, and Redfern Now won several awards.

Ready for This (2015) won a Logie Award for Most Outstanding Comedy Program and an AACTA Award for Best Children's Television Series, as well as being nominated for International Emmy Kids Award.

In 2021, The Moogai won the Grand Jury Prize in the Midnight Shorts category at SXSW, Best Horror Short at LA International Shorts Festival, and Film Victoria's Erwin Rado Award for Best Australian Short Film at Melbourne International Film Festival, which rendered him eligible to enter the Academy Awards. It also won Best Director (Shorts) at Brooklyn Horror Film Festival, and earned a nomination for an Australian Writers' Guild Award (AWGIE).

In October 2023, Bell was the recipient of the inaugural First Nations Screen Fellowship, awarded by Screen NSW, described as "a 12-month initiative is designed to propel the careers of mid-career to established First Nations creatives by opening doors and creating pathways in the industry". It gave him the opportunity to travel to the US and UK, to make essential industry connections.

The feature The Moogai won the Audience Award for Best Feature at Sydney Film Festival, as well as the prestigious CinefestOZ Film Prize.
