= Sally Riley (producer) =

Australian producer

- Occupations: Television producer; film producer; screenwriter
- Years active: 1995– present
- Known for: Advocacy for Indigenous Australians in the film and television industry
- Notable work: Redfern Now; Cleverman; Total Control; Mystery Road; The Heights

Sally Riley PSM is an Australian filmmaker, writer, producer and media executive, as of 2021 Head of Scripted Production at the Australian Broadcasting Corporation (ABC).

== Early life and education ==
Riley, a Wiradjuri woman, grew up in Narromine, in the Central West of New South Wales After her father died when she was 16, she completed Year 12 at Narromine High School.

Riley took on a secretarial role at the local metalworks until she was 19, when she went on a three-year trip around Australia in a troop carrier with her then boyfriend, looking at Indigenous rock and cave paintings. After that she worked for a while as a liaison officer for Aboriginal land councils, before enrolling at the University of Wollongong (UOW) with the intention of becoming an actor.

She graduated from UOW with a Bachelor of Creative Arts (Theatre) in 1991, but changed course and went on to do the directing course at the National Institute of Dramatic Art (NIDA) in Sydney, graduating in 1993. She then took up a traineeship at Film Australia, around 1994.

== Career ==
=== Early career ===
Riley started out as an independent filmmaker, director and freelance writer.

She spent time as a Writer in Residence at Central Australian Aboriginal Media Association (CAAMA) Television in Alice Springs, and as a director for the Melbourne Theatre Company and at Urban Theatre Projects in the Sydney suburb of Bankstown.

=== Screen Australia ===
In 2000 Riley was appointed head of the Indigenous Branch of the Australian Film Commission, which became the Indigenous Department of the new statutory organisation in 2008, Screen Australia. In her role as head of the department, she was responsible for the production of the award-winning feature film Samson and Delilah in 2009, directed by Warwick Thornton. She helped to launch the career of other Indigenous film professionals, such as Wayne Blair, Beck Cole and Darlene Johnson, and under her leadership, development support was provided for the acclaimed series First Australians (2008), by Rachel Perkins and Darren Dale. In this role she was determined to develop Indigenous producers and film crews, especially assistant directors and designers, to support the wealth of directing talent".

She also led the development of an industry handbook, Pathways & Protocols – a filmmaker's guide to working with Indigenous people, culture and concepts.

=== ABC ===
In 2010 Riley was appointed as the inaugural head of the Indigenous department at ABC Television, during this time acting as executive producer on the film Mabo (2012) and the TV series Redfern Now (2012–). Redfern Now was the first television drama "commissioned, written, acted and produced by Indigenous Australians", creating employment for many Indigenous creatives and winning the 2013 Silver Logie for Most Outstanding Drama Series. She was also responsible for bringing The Gods of Wheat Street, Cleverman, 8MMM, and The Warriors to the small screen when in this role.

In May 2016 Riley was appointed to the newly-created role of Head of Scripted Production, This position is responsible for all drama, comedy and Indigenous-related programs on ABC Television. In this role, ABC productions commissioned by Riley have included the series Stateless, Mystery Road, Total Control, Aftertaste, Rosehaven, Wakefield and The Newsreader.

Riley aims to identify projects which will attract new audiences to the ABC, using release strategies which lead to ABC iview, the ABC's online streaming platform. She has a strong focus to bringing greater diversity of all kinds (age, race, gender and ability) onto the screen and behind the productions.

== Filmography ==
=== Short films ===
Riley wrote and directed several short films early in her career:

- Fly Peewee, Fly! (1995), one of six films in the series From Sand to Celluloid (1996), about a young boy teaching his white grandmother and Aboriginal father perspective. Nominated for an AWGIE Award in 1996.
- In Search of Archie (c.1998, 30 mins), documentary about writer Archie Weller trying to find proof of his Aboriginality.
- Confessions of a Headhunter (2000), based on a short story by Archie Weller, who co-wrote the film script with Riley, examines conflict between the Noongar people around Perth and colonial culture. The drama tells the story of two men who seek revenge after the statue of their ancestor warrior Yagan was repeatedly decapitated. It won the AFI Award for Best Short Film in 2000, the script category of the Western Australian Premier's Book Awards in 2001, and was the winner of the Cinema Nova Award for Best Fiction Short Film at the Melbourne International Film Festival. It was also nominated for the Film Critics Circle of Australia's award for Best Australian Short Film, and the AFI Award for Best Screenplay.

== Recognition ==
Riley was awarded the Public Service Medal in the 2008 Queen's Birthday Honours for her work in "developing initiatives that have increased the participation of Indigenous Australians in the film and television industries".

She was co-winner of the Australian Directors Guild's 2011 Cecil Holmes Award (with Erica Glynn, sister of Warwick Thornton).

In 2016 she was listed as one of the FP Top 100 Global Thinkers.

In 2017, her alma mater the University of Wollongong awarded the Alumni Award for Social Impact to Riley, saying that she had "used her voice and talent as a filmmaker to advance representation of Indigenous culture globally, and drive a substantial shift in common perception – and misperception – of Indigenous life in Australia".

In 2020 Riley was invited to join the Academy of Motion Pictures Arts and Sciences, the governing body of the Oscars, based on "her outstanding contribution... in particular, in recognition of her drive to champion diverse storytelling in Australia, with an impact across the international landscape". This enables her to vote for the Oscars.

Riley has been recognised as being very influential and good at bringing good series to the small screen. Stateless and Mystery Road were selected for the Berlin Film Festival's Series section in 2020. Her advocacy for Aboriginal self-representation in the industry and work in developing initiatives to bring about increased participation by Indigenous artists, has earned respect.

In 2023 Riley was the recipient of the Adelaide Film Festival's Don Dunstan Award. Larissa Behrendt wrote in her Don Dunstan Award essay:

Sally Riley’s legacy goes beyond the content she has commissioned on the screen. It goes to the capacity building of First Nations creatives in the film and television industry and in seeing First Nations stories becoming central in the national narrative.

== Personal life ==
Riley has a son, Eli, and is divorced from his father. Eli is also a filmmaker.
