= Ready for This (TV series) =

Australian teen drama series

- Genre: Teen drama
- Created by: Darren Dale; Miranda Dear; Liz Doran; Joanna Werner
- Starring: Majeda Beatty; Liam Talty; Madeleine Madden; Leonie Whyman; Aaron McGrath; Christian Byers
- Composer: Dave McCormack
- Country of origin: Australia
- Original language: English
- No. of seasons: 1
- No. of episodes: 13

Production
- Executive producers: Darren Dale; Joanna Werner; Simon Hopkinson; Bernadette O'Mahony
- Producers: Miranda Dear; Joanna Werner
- Cinematography: Martin McGrath
- Editor: Rodrigo Balart
- Running time: 23 minutes 41 minutes (premiere)
- Production companies: Blackfella Films; Werner Film Productions

Original release
- Network: ABC3
- Release: 5 October – 28 December 2015

Ready for This is an Australian teen-oriented television drama series that premiered on ABC3 on 5 October 2015. It follows five Indigenous teenagers who venture across the country to Sydney to pursue their dreams.

== Cast ==
- Majeda Beatty as Ava Ban
- Christian Byers as Reece Scott
- Madeleine Madden as Zoe Preston
- Aaron L. McGrath as Levi Mackay
- Liam Talty as Dylan Brockman
- Leonie Whyman as Lily Carney
- Lasarus Ratuere as Mick
- Christine Anu as Vee
- Ryan Johnson as Dave
- Rahel Romahn as Ryan
- Jimi Bani as Nat Brockman
- Carla Bonner as Coach Beeton

== Production ==
The 13-part series is written by Liz Doran, Jon Bell, Guila Sandler, Josh Mapleston, Kristen Dunphy, Kirsty Fisher, Leah Purcell, Steven McGregor and Greg Waters. A joint venture between Werner Film Productions and Blackfella Films, it was produced by Big Chance Films for the ABC, in association with Screen Australia and Screen NSW, with international sales by the Australian Children's Television Foundation (ACTF). The series is produced by Joanna Werner and Miranda Dear and executive produced by Joanna Werner, Darren Dale, ABC's commissioning editor Simon Hopkinson, and the ACTF's Bernadette O'Mahony.

Executive producer Darren Dale said: "A concept forged through mutual admiration and respect, Werner Film Productions and Blackfella Films are delighted to be producing Ready For This for the ABC through our joint venture Big Chance Films. This aspirational series highlights the challenges and adventures of elite teens brought together in pursuit of their dreams."

"Ready For This is the collaboration of two exceptional Australian producers and we're thrilled to bring this landmark new drama to our ABC3 audience. After the success of Dance Academy and Nowhere Boys, our audience is ready to be captivated by these exciting new characters and storylines," said ABC TV's Head of Children's Television, Deirdre Brennan.

== Episodes ==
No.	Title	Directed by	Written by	Original release date
1	"Brand New Me"	Daina Reid	Liz Doran	5 October 2015
2	"The Golden Sneaker"	Daina Reid	Jon Bell	12 October 2015
3	"The Solo"	Daina Reid	Liz Doran	19 October 2015
4	"Shadow Boxing"	Daina Reid	Giula Sandler	26 October 2015
5	"Blank Canvas"	Adrian Russell Wills	Josh Mapleston	2 November 2015
6	"Back On Track"	Adrian Russell Wills	Kristen Dunphy	9 November 2015
7	"Fresh Meat"	Adrian Russell Wills	Kirsty Fisher & Liz Doran	16 November 2015
8	"The Crocodile"	Tony Krawitz	Josh Mapleston	23 November 2015
9	"The Birthday Party"	Adrian Russell Wills	Leah Purcell	30 November 2015
10	"It's Not You"	Tony Krawitz	Liz Doran	7 December 2015
11	"A Wonderful Day"	Tony Krawitz	Steven McGregor	14 December 2015
12	"Stage Fright"	Tony Krawitz	Greg Waters	21 December 2015
13	"My Life"	Tony Krawitz	Liz Doran	28 December 2015

== Awards ==
Year	Award	Category	Nominee	Result
2016	International Emmy Kids Awards	Kids:Animation		Nominated
