= Deep Water (TV series) =

Australian television series

- Genre: Crime drama
- Written by: Kris Wyld; Kym Goldsworthy
- Directed by: Shawn Seet
- Starring: Yael Stone; Noah Taylor; Jeremy Lindsay Taylor; Danielle Cormack; Ben Oxenbould; Dan Spielman; Craig McLachlan; William McInnes
- Country of origin: Australia
- Original language: English
- No. of seasons: 1
- No. of episodes: 4

Production
- Executive producer: Sue Masters
- Producers: Darren Dale; Miranda Dear
- Production company: Blackfella Films

Original release
- Network: SBS
- Release: 5 October – 26 October 2016

Deep Water is an Australian crime drama series screened on SBS from 5 October 2016. This four-part miniseries is a Blackfella Films' production, directed by Shawn Seet with Director of Photography Bruce Young.

The drama is based on the historical, unsolved hate murders of possibly 30 to 80 gay men in Sydney's eastern suburbs and beaches in the 1980s and '90s. SBS broadcast a documentary of these events, Deep Water: The Real Story (2016), in conjunction with the miniseries.

== Plot ==
Detectives Tori Lustigman (Yael Stone) and Nick Manning (Noah Taylor) are assigned a brutal murder case in Bondi. They begin to uncover mounting evidence to suggest the killing is connected to a spate of unexplained deaths, "suicides", and disappearances of gay men throughout the 1980s and 1990s. Haunted by the disappearance of her teenage brother, Tori is fascinated by the case and soon becomes fixated on it. When more ritualistic murders occur that have the same bizarre signature, Tori and Nick put their relationships, their careers and lives on the line to reveal the truth.

== Cast ==
- Yael Stone as Tori Lustigman
- Noah Taylor as Nick Manning
- William McInnes as Chief Inspector Peel
- Danielle Cormack as Brenda MacIntosh
- Jeremy Lindsay Taylor as Oscar Taylor
- Craig McLachlan as Kyle Hampton
- Dan Spielman as Rhys Callahan
- Ben Oxenbould as Chris Toohey
- Simon Burke as Simon Mawbrey
- Fletcher Humphrys as Brett Odonoahue
- Mitchell Butel as Thomas Katz
- John Brumpton as Eddie Mac
- Caroline Brazier as Tina Toohey
- Geoff Morrell as Don Lustigman
- Victoria Haralabidou as Anna Rexhaj
- Paul Goddard as Jeremy
- Simon Elrahi
- George H. Xanthis as Rohan
- Renee Lim
- Nathan Lovejoy
- Julian Maroun as Haris and Amar Rexhaj
- Josh Lev
- Kevin Godfrey
- Craig Michell
