= Rachel Perkins =

Australian filmmaker (born 1970)

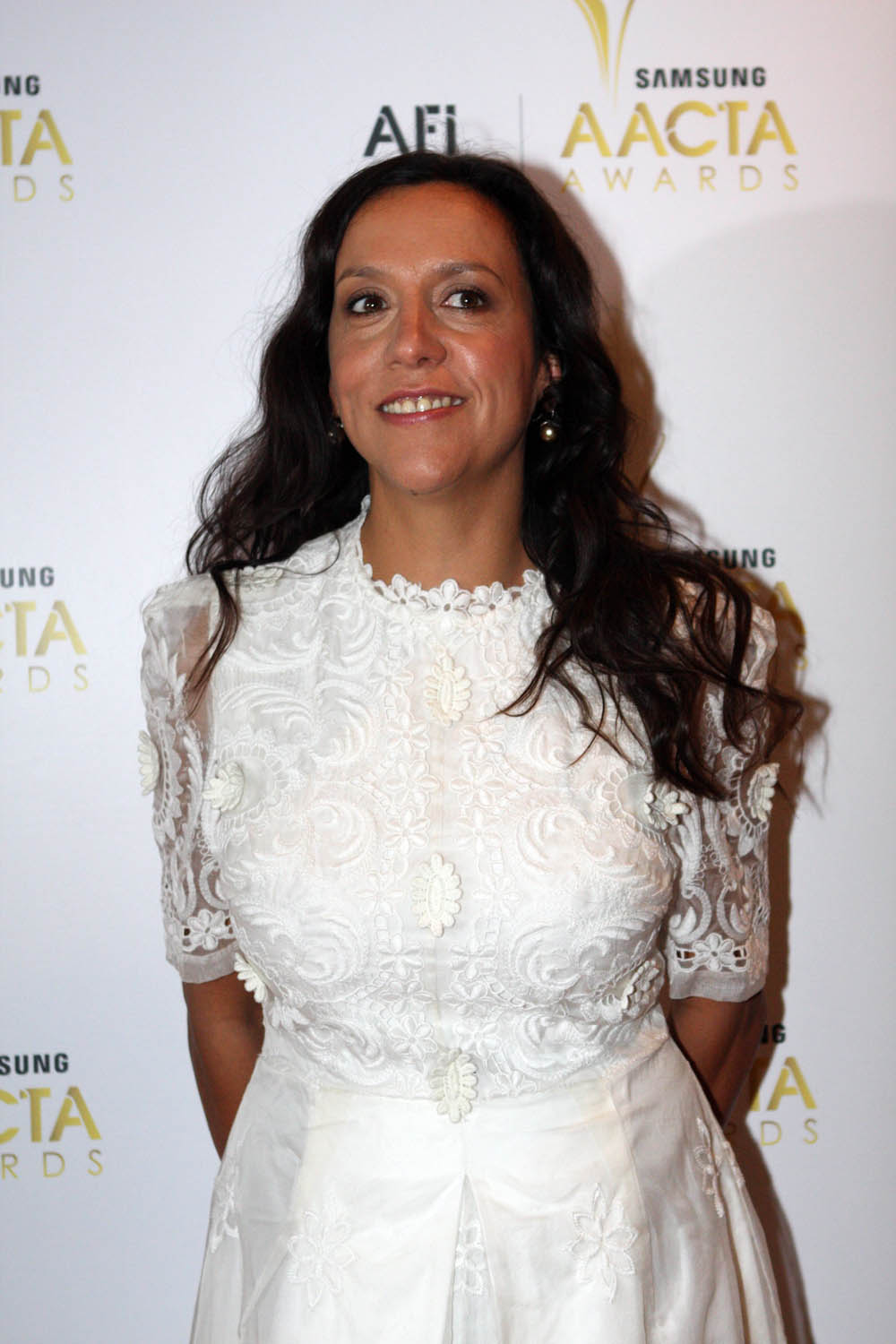
- Perkins at the 2012 AACTA Awards in Sydney
- Born: 1970 (age 55–56); Canberra, Australian Capital Territory, Australia
- Occupations: Producer, director, writer
- Years active: 1998–present
- Spouse: Richard McGrath (divorced)
- Children: 1
- Father: Charles Perkins
- Relatives: Hetty Perkins (grandmother); Hetti Perkins (sister); Madeleine Madden (niece)

Rachel Perkins (born 1970) is an Indigenous Australian film and television director, producer, and screenwriter. She founded and was co-director of the independent film production company Blackfella Films from 1992 until 2022. Perkins and the company were responsible for producing First Australians (2008), an award-winning documentary series that remains the highest-selling educational title in Australia, and which Perkins regards as her most important work. She directed the films Radiance (1998), One Night the Moon (2001), Bran Nue Dae (2009), the courtroom drama telemovie Mabo (2012), and Jasper Jones (2017). The acclaimed television drama series Redfern Now was made by Blackfella Films, and Perkins directed two episodes as well as the feature-length conclusion to the series, Promise Me (2015).

Perkins is an Arrernte and Kalkadoon woman from Central Australia, who was raised in Canberra. She is the daughter of Aboriginal activist Charles Perkins and his wife Eileen.

== Early life and education ==
Perkins was born in Canberra, Australian Capital Territory, in 1970. She is the daughter of Charlie Perkins, granddaughter of Hetty Perkins, and has Arrernte, Kalkadoon, Irish, and German ancestry. Her siblings are Adam and Hetti Perkins, an art curator, and her niece is actress Madeleine Madden.

She and her sister attended Melrose High School in Canberra.

Perkins' paternal grandmother's people were from Alice Springs, and she wanted to learn more about that side of the family's culture, so, after finishing school in 1988, she applied for a job as a television presenter with the Central Australian Aboriginal Media Association (CAAMA), mainly to get the airfare to fly there. As she expected, she was not given the job, but they offered her a traineeship at Imparja Television, where she learnt the basics of production, including editing and sound recording.

After starting her career as a filmmaker, in the early 1990s, she won a scholarship to study production at the Australian Film, Television and Radio School (AFTRS) in Sydney, where she met and collaborated with Warwick Thornton. She completed the Specialist Extension Course Certificate – Producing in 1995, and also met and became friends with Ivan Sen there.

== Career ==
A few years after beginning her traineeship at CAAMA, aged 21, Perkins became executive producer of the Indigenous unit at SBS Television, the only person in the unit.

In 1992, Perkins founded Blackfella Films, a documentary and narrative production company creating distinctive Australian content for television, live theatre, and online platforms, with a particular focus on Indigenous Australian stories. Much of her film work was done under the company name.

Perkins wrote, directed, and co-produced (with Ned Lander) a 55-minute documentary film about her father's 1965 protest bus journey into regional New South Wales, dubbed the "Freedom Ride". The film was called Freedom Ride, and it was part of the 1993 series Blood Brothers, which profiled four prominent Aboriginal men. Perkins said that she travelled with her father to many of the places that the Freedom Ride visited, and it was also a good opportunity to interviewer her father about his early life and get an insight into him and events that she would not otherwise have had access to. She also gained an "understanding of the importance of filmmaking, in terms of capturing Australian cultural history".

In 1996, under the auspices of the Indigenous Branch of the Australian Film Commission, Perkins produced a film for Warwick Thornton (who was also a friend), From Sand to Celluloid – Payback. (Note: Penny McDonald is listed in most credits as producer, but Perkins is listed as line producer.)

Radiance (1998) was her first feature fiction film as a director. She said later that it took a long time to cast the main characters, who included Trisha Morton-Thomas, Rachael Maza, and Deb Mailman, then a newcomer from Brisbane, and that they rehearsed for six weeks.

In 2001, she co-wrote (with playwright John Romeril) and directed the telemovie One Night the Moon, featuring musicians Paul Kelly, Kev Carmody, and Maireed Hannah.

First Australians was a seven-part documentary series broadcast on SBS Television in 2008. The general manager of SBS Nigel Milan had asked Gordon Briscoe what he could do for Indigenous people, and Briscoe suggested giving them back their history. It was a very ambitious project, and Perkins said that it was the most important thing she would ever work on, "because it really was an opportunity to try and tell the Indigenous story in a comprehensive manner from an Indigenous perspective, over a span of 200 years. It had never been done before". The series took six years to make, and as of 2024, remains the highest-selling educational title in Australia.

Bran Nue Dae, a film version of Jimmy Chi's 1990s hit stage musical, was directed by Perkins and released in 2009.

In 2009, Perkins was curator of the Message Sticks Indigenous Film Festival. This tenth anniversary of the festival held at the Sydney Opera House featured the premiere of Fire Talker, a documentary film about her father Charlie Perkins by Australian filmmaker Ivan Sen.

Her courtroom drama/biopic telemovie about land rights campaigner Eddie Koiki Mabo, Mabo, featuring Jimi Bani and Deborah Mailman, was broadcast in 2012.

Also in 2012, Perkins directed two episodes of the first series of Redfern Now in 2012: "Stand Up" and "Pretty Boy Blue", the latter dealing with a death-in-custody. She also directed the feature-length conclusion Redfern Now: Promise Me (2015). Luke Buckmaster of The Guardian gave the film 4 out of 5 stars, praising its "superb cast" and saying "the series concludes at the peak of its power".

Perkins executive produced the first series of First Contact (2014), a reality television show which challenged the non-Indigenous participants of Indigenous Australians.

Also in 2014, she finished making the documentary film Black Panther Woman for SBS. The film was nominated for the Documentary Australia Foundation Award for Australian Documentary at the Sydney Film Festival.

She directed the feature fiction film Jasper Jones, released in 2017.

Perkins wrote, directed, presented, and produced the three-part documentary series The Australian Wars which aired on SBS and NITV in September 2022. This series examines the Australian frontier wars fought across the country when British settlers moved in.

Perkins has said that of all the filmmaking jobs, she likes editing the best, as it is the most creative part. She also said that she feels a great sense of responsibility "to make films or to use media as a vehicle to tell my people's story and to create change".

=== Blackfella Films ===
Perkins founded Blackfella Films in 1992.

Darren Dale joined the company in 2000, becoming co-director of the company. The award-winning First Australians, a seven-part documentary series broadcast on SBS Television in 2008, won many awards and was also sold overseas. Miranda Dear, formerly head of drama at ABC Television, was a producer and head of drama at Blackfella from 2010 to 2020. Other productions have included the television film Mabo, the TV series Redfern Now, and many more since. In 2009, Blackfella Films was renting space from Bangarra Dance Theatre in offices overlooking Sydney Harbour.

In 2022, Perkins left Blackfella Films.

== Other activities ==
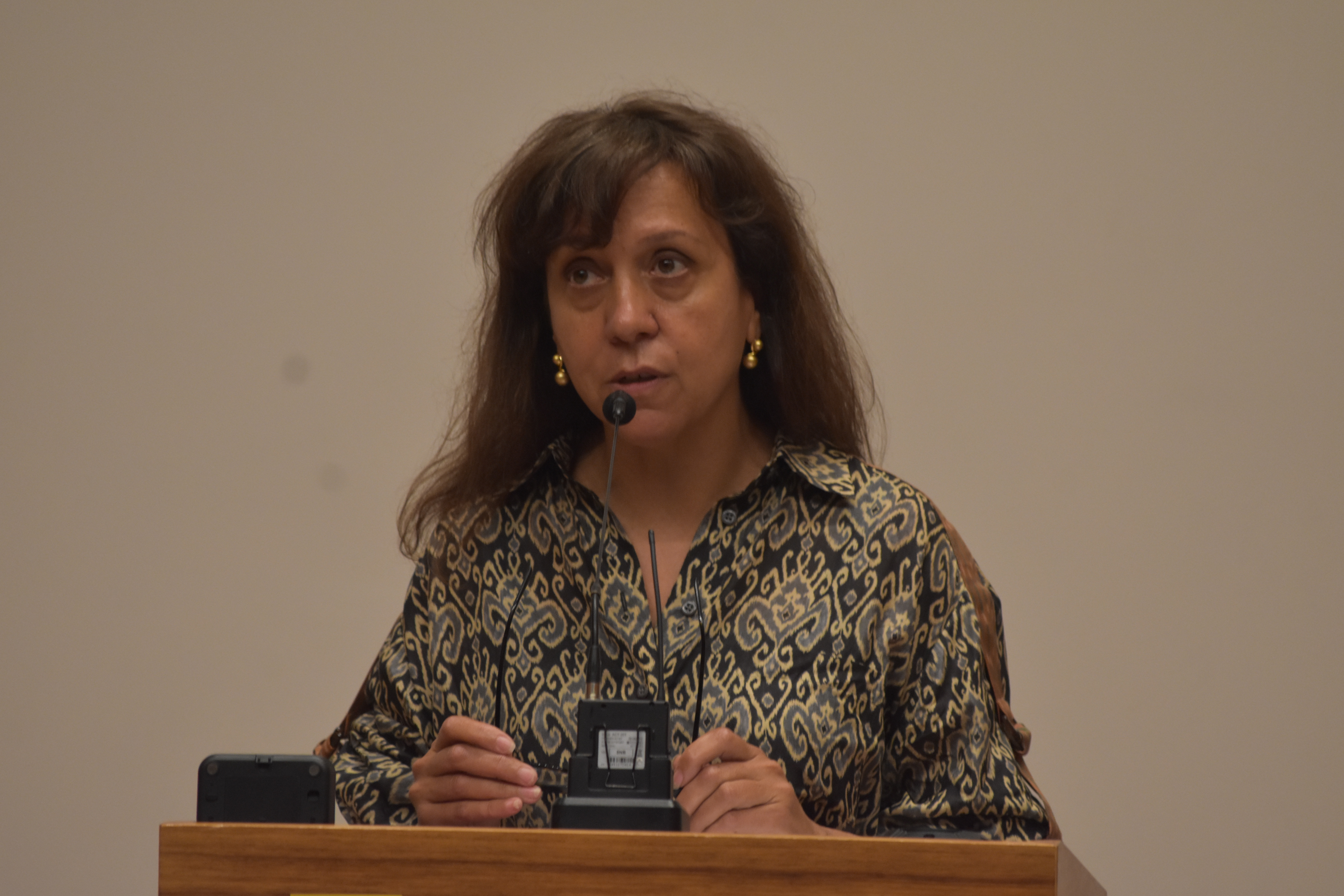
Perkins in 2025 at Trinity College

Perkins served as Commissioner with the Australian Film Commission from 2004 to 2008, and since 2009 has been on the board of Screen Australia. She has been a member of the boards of the New South Wales Film and Television Office (now Screen NSW), the Australian Film, Television and Radio School (AFTRS), National Indigenous Media Association, the Indigenous Screen Australia, and the Australian International Documentary Conference. She has said that she gets onto these boards in order to help drive government policy.

In 2015, she raised funding for the Arrernte Women's Project, which had been established in 2014, one of the goals of which was to record the traditional songs and associated cultural knowledge of the Arrernte women of Central Australia, to create an archive for future generations.

Perkins became president of the AIATSIS Foundation in 2015. She was a council member from 17 May 2017 to 16 May 2021, and is deputy chair of AIATSIS board from 1 July 2024 30 September 2024.

In 2019, she was invited to give the ABC's annual Boyer Lecture, which she titled The End of Silence, and broadcast on ABC RN in November and available as a podcast.

Perkins served two terms on the Australian Heritage Council, from February 2015 to February 2018 and from March 2018 to March 2021.

In 2023, she campaigned for a "yes" vote in the 2023 Australian referendum to establish an Indigenous Voice to Parliament.

In March 2024, Perkins was a guest speaker in a "spotlight session" at the Australian International Documentary Conference. In the same month, she was appointed chair of AFTRS, the first Indigenous filmmaker to be appointed to the position in its 50-year history.

In 2024, she conducted masterclasses for Indigenous screen students at the Centre of Appropriate Technology in Alice Springs.

In March 2025, Perkins took part in discussion about the role of storytelling, hosted by the Bob Hawke Prime Ministerial Centre in partnership with WOMADelaide Planet Talks in Adelaide, along with Daniel Riley, artistic director of Australian Dance Theatre, and led by playwright Wesley Enoch.

== Recognition and awards ==
=== Personal honours ===
- 2002: Winner Byron Kennedy Award, awarded by the Australian Film Institute, "for her vast amount and breadth of her work as writer, director, producer, executive producer and instigator across drama, documentary and television; for her dynamism and creativity; for her outstanding ability to inspire others and work collaboratively; and for her passionate championing of Indigenous filmmaking and filmmakers"
- 2011: Australian International Documentary Conference Stanley Hawes Award, in recognition of her contribution to documentary filmmaking in Australia
- 2017: Lifetime Achievement Award at the National Dreamtime Awards 2018, in recognition of her contributions film and culture
- 2018: Featured in Blackwell & Ruth's global project 200 Women: Who Will Change the Way You See the World, which included a book and series of exhibitions around the world
- 2023: Finalist, National NAIDOC Awards

=== Film and TV awards ===
Some of the many awards for which her films and TV productions have been nominated or won include:

- 1994 – The Tudawali Award: Blood Brothers – Freedom Ride (1993)
- 1998 – Nominated, AFI Award for Best Achievement in Direction]: Radiance (1998)
- 1998 – Winner, Melbourne International Film Festival, Most Popular Feature Film: Radiance (1998)
- 1998 – Winner, Canberra International Film Festival Audience Award: Radiance (1998)
- 2001 – Winner, AWGIE Award (Australian Writers' Guild), Television Original: One Night the Moon (2001)
- 2001 – Winner, AWGIE Award, Major Award: One Night the Moon (2001)
- 2001 – Winner, IF Award for Best Direction: One Night the Moon (2001) (nominated)
- 2001 – Winner, New York International Independent Film & Video Festival, Genre Award Best Feature Film – Musical: One Night the Moon (2001)
- 2002 – Winner, Film Critics Circle of Australia Awards, Special Achievement Award: One Night the Moon (2001)
- 2009 – Multiple wins and nominations for First Australians
- 2009 – Nominated, FCCA Awards, Best Director, for Bran Nue Day
- 2013 – Winner, ADG Award, Best Direction in a TV Drama Series, for Series 1, Episode 6 of Redfern Now: "Pretty Boy Blue:
- 2013 – Winner, Deadly Awards, TV Show of the Year, for Redfern Now
- 2017 – Winner, Antipodean Film Festival Jury Grand Prix, Best Feature Film
- 2019 – Winner, AACTA Award for Best Television Drama Series, for Mystery Road, Series 1
- 2019 – Winner, Australian Directors' Guild Awards, Best director in a television drama series, for Mystery Road, Series 1
- 2023 – Winner (with Darren Dale, Jacob Hickey and Don Watson), New South Wales Premier's History Awards, Digital History Prize: The Australian Wars, Episode 1

== Personal life ==
Perkins has a son with her ex-husband, filmmaker Richard McGrath.

She has said that next to filmmaking, music is her other passion.

As of March 2024, she lives in Alice Springs.

== Selected filmography ==
- Blood Brothers – Freedom Ride (1993) – producer, director, writer
- Radiance (1998) – director
- One Night the Moon (2001) – director, writer
- Flat (2002), a short film by Beck Cole – co-producer (with Darren Dale)
- Mimi (2002), a short film by Warwick Thornton – co-producer (with Darren Dale)
- First Australians (2008) – producer, director, writer, narrator
- Bran Nue Dae (2010) – director, writer
- Mabo (2012) – director
- Black Panther Woman (2014) – director
- Jasper Jones (2017) – director
- Mystery Road (2019 & 2020) – TV series
- Total Control (s1, 2019) – TV series
- The Australian Wars (2022) – writer, director, presenter, and producer
