= Madeleine Madden =

Australian actress

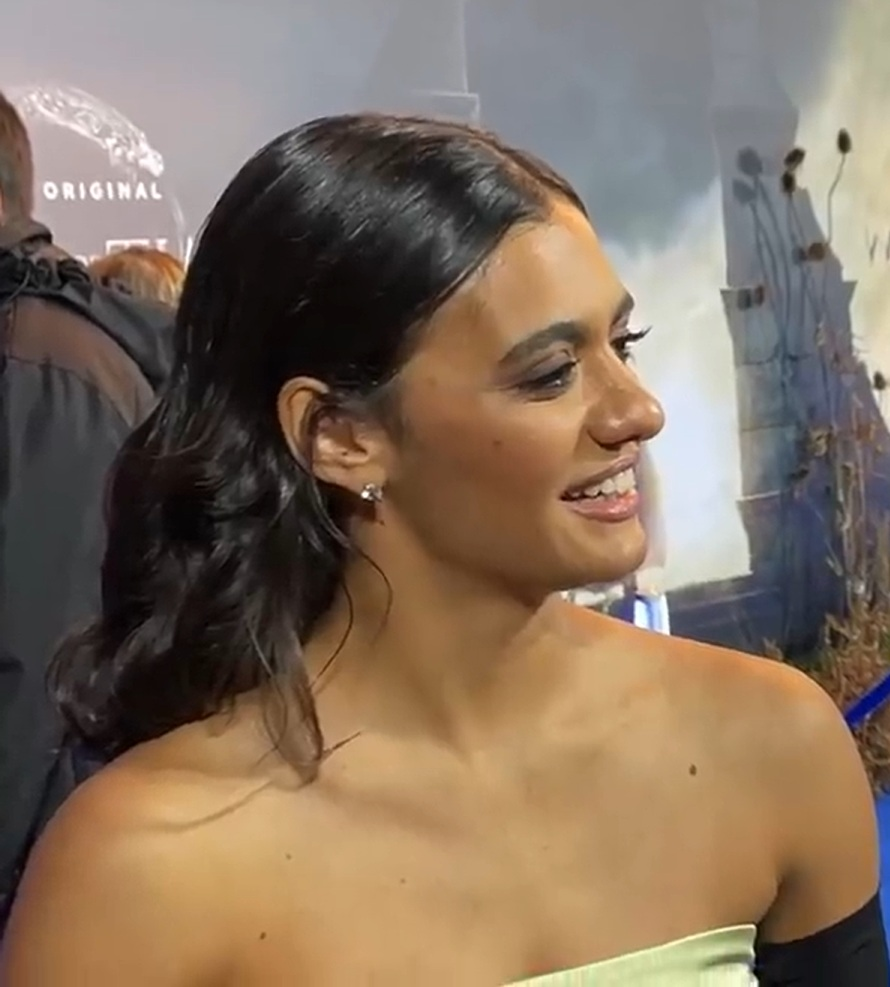
- Madden in 2021
- Born: January 29, 1997 (age 29); Sydney, Australia
- Years active: 2009–present
- Height: 168 cm (5 ft 6 in)
- Mother: Hetti Perkins
- Relatives: Charles Perkins (grandfather); Miah Madden (half-sister); Rachel Perkins (aunt)

Madeleine Madden (born 29 January 1997) is an Australian actress. She is best known for playing Egwene al'Vere in the Amazon Prime series The Wheel of Time.

== Early life and education ==
Madeleine Madden was born on January 29, 1997, the daughter of Lee Madden (Gadigal and Bundjalung) and art curator and writer Hetti Perkins. She grew up in a political family, being the great-granddaughter of Arrernte elder Hetty Perkins and the granddaughter of activist and soccer player Charles Perkins. Her aunt is director Rachel Perkins. She has two older sisters and two younger half-sisters, including actor Miah Madden. Her father died in a car accident in 2003.

Madden grew up around Redfern, a Sydney inner city suburb, and attended Rose Bay Secondary College.

== Career ==
In 2010, at age 13, Madden became the first teenager in Australia to deliver an address to the nation, when she delivered a two-minute speech on the future of Indigenous Australians. It was broadcast to 6 million viewers on every free-to-air television network in Australia.

=== Television ===
Madden starred in Australia's first Aboriginal teen drama, Ready for This, and in the critically applauded Redfern Now. She has also starred in The Moodys, Jack Irish, My Place and The Code. In 2016, she starred in the mini series Tomorrow, When the War Began which is based on the John Marsden series of young adult books.

In 2018, she played Marion Quade in the mini series Picnic at Hanging Rock, Crystal Swan in the TV mini series Mystery Road, and Immy DuPain in the series Pine Gap. In August 2019, Madden was cast as Egwene al'Vere in Amazon's television adaptation of The Wheel of Time, which premiered in 2021 and aired its third season in 2025.

Madden voiced Helena Walker, the protagonist of Ark: The Animated Series, an Aboriginal Australian character and paleontologist.

=== Film ===
Madden has starred in short films by Deborah Mailman, and Meryl Tankard and co-starred with Christina Ricci and Jack Thompson in Around the Block. Her first film acting job was at 8 years old. She aims to become a director in the future.

In 2019, Madden made her big Hollywood debut as Sammy in the Nickelodeon film Dora and the Lost City of Gold.

== Filmography ==
=== Film ===
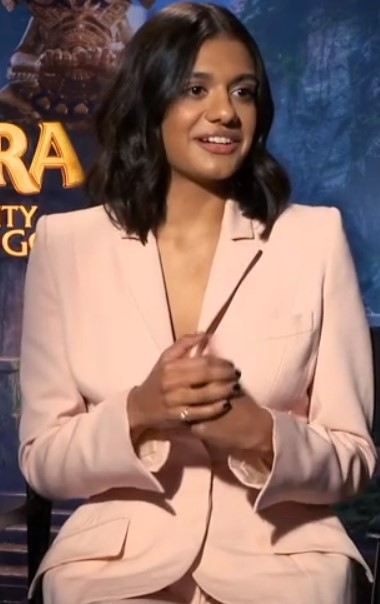
Madden talking about Dora and the Lost City of Gold 2019

Year	Title	Role	Notes
2009	Ralph	Maddie	Short
2011	Moth	Trinni	Short
2012	The Hoarders	Lily	Short
2013	Around the Block	Williemai	
2014	Frontier	Toora	Short
2016	Gimpsey	Jaze	Short
2018	Cooee	Ripley	Short
2019	Dora and the Lost City of Gold	Sammy Moore	
2026	Saccharine	Alanya	
TBA	Chasing Millions	Diana	Filming

=== TV ===
Year	Title	Role	Notes
2009	My Place	Laura	Episode: "2008 Laura"
2012–13	Redfern Now	Chloe	Episodes: "Stand Up", "Pokies"
2014	The Moodys	Lucy	Episode: "Australia Day"
2014	Jack Irish: Dead Point	Marie	TV film
2014	The Code	Sheyna Smith	Episodes: "1.1", "1.2"
2015	Ready for This	Zoe Preston	Main role (13 episodes)
2016	The Weekend Shift	Laura	TV series
2016	Tomorrow, When the War Began	Corrie Mackenzie	TV miniseries
2017	High Life	Holly McMahon	TV series
2017	Doctor Doctor	Millie	Episode: "Picture of Innocence"
2018	Picnic at Hanging Rock	Marion Quade	TV miniseries
2018	Mystery Road	Crystal Swan	TV miniseries
2018	Pine Gap	Immy Dupain	TV miniseries
2018	Tidelands	Violca	Main role
2021–25	The Wheel of Time	Egwene al'Vere	TV series
2022	The Australian Wars	North West Woman	Documentary series
2024	Ark: The Animated Series	Helena Walker	Voice role

=== Video games ===
Year	Title	Role	Notes
2023	Ark: Survival Ascended	Helena Walker/HLNA	Voice role
2021	Ark: Survival Evolved	Helena Walker/HLNA	Voice role
2021	Ark: Genesis Pt 2	Helena Walker/HLNA	Voice role
