= The Everlasting Secret Family =

- Directed by: Michael Thornhill
- Written by: Frank Moorhouse
- Based on: stories by Frank Moorhouse
- Produced by: Michael Thornhill executive: Antony I. Ginnane
- Starring: Arthur Dignam; Mark Lee; Heather Mitchell; Dennis Miller; John Meillon; Paul Goddard; Anna Volska
- Cinematography: Julian Penney
- Edited by: Pam Barnetta
- Music by: Tony Bremner
- Production companies: FGH; Hemdale Film Corporation; International Film Management
- Release date: 1988
- Running time: 94 mins
- Country: Australia
- Language: English
- Budget: $2.5 million
- Box office: $280,000 (Australia)

The Everlasting Secret Family is a 1988 Australian film directed by Michael Thornhill about a secret society of gay men. It is based on Frank Moorhouse's so-named collection of four short stories published in 1980.

The movie was financed by Antony I. Ginnane's IFM company.

IFM pre-sold the movie to Hemdale Film Corporation for $1.5 million but Hemdale was later unable to meet its pre-sale obligations.

== Plot ==
A fictional group of middle-aged homosexual men, including a senator, exercise quasi-masonic influence and power over teenage schoolboys from the fictional Saint Michael's Private School for Boys. The film follows one of these boys (called only 'Youth'), as he rises through the ranks of the secret society.

== Cast ==
- Mark Lee as Youth
- John Meillon as Judge
- Drew Norman as Oil Boy
- Dennis Miller as Eric, the Chauffeur
- Arthur Dignam as Senator
- Alan Carey as Doctor at Oval
- Ken Keen as Headmaster
- Marcus Cornelius as Teacher at Oval
- Heather Mitchell as Wife
- Michael Winchester as School Teacher
- Louis Nowra as Shop Assistant
- Dominic Barry as Bell Captain
- Paul Davies as Waiter #1
- Allan Penney as Gardener
- Victor Ramon as Maitre d' #1
- Michael Kozuki as Mr. Akutangana
- Anna Volska as Wife's Friend
- Paul Goddard as Son
- John Clayton as Mayor

== Reviews ==
Janet Maslin of The New York Times in 1989 thought that the film was divided "into two halves, the first engrossing and the second ridiculous... The action becomes farfetched, the actors hopelessly unconvincing, and everyone ages so badly—thanks to too much eyebrow pencil and talcum powder—that the film winds up looking like a high-school play".

RS reviewing for Time Out stated that "All the gay characters are 'elderly pervert' stereotypes, cruel, calculating and vampirish. Yet, for a film that takes so rigidly homophobic a stance, an awful lot of time is spent dwelling on youthful tanned muscles and taut buttocks".
