= Angela Betzien =

Australian playwright and screenwriter

- Born: 1978 (age 47–48); Rockhampton, Queensland, Australia
- Occupations: Playwright; screenwriter

Angela Betzien (born 1978) is an Australian playwright and screenwriter.

Betzien was born in Rockhampton, Queensland, Australian in 1978. She graduated from Queensland University of Technology with a Master of Arts for her thesis, "Hoods: Creating political theatre for young audiences".

== Career ==
=== Theatre ===
Her first play, Dog Wins Lotto, was produced by the Queensland Theatre Company in 1997. Her second play, The Postcard, won the George Landen Dann Award in 1999. The following year she won a fellowship to the Royal Court Theatre in London as writer-in-residence.

She subsequently won a State Library of Victoria creative fellowship (2008), Kit Denton Fellowship (2012), Patrick White Playwrights' Fellowship (2013), Kim Williams' Fellowship Award (2015) and Sidney Myer Creative Fellowship (2017).

Her play for young adults, Hoods, was first staged at the Sydney Opera House in 2006. It won the inaugural Richard Wherrett Prize and the Stage Award for Theatre for Young People at the 2007 AWGIE Awards.

=== RealTV ===
Betzien is co-founder of an independent theatre company called RealTV (also Real TV) with theatre director and filmmaker Leticia Cáceres. Their work for young audiences include Hoods, War Crimes and Children of the Black Skirt.

=== Film and television ===
Betzien was one of the screenwriters for Total Control (2019–2021), produced by Blackfella Films for ABC Television and for Secret City (2019) produced by Matchbox Pictures and Foxtel.
