= The Australian Wars =

2022 Australian TV documentary series

- Genre: Documentary
- Created by: Rachel Perkins
- Country of origin: Australia
- Original language: English
- No. of episodes: 3

Original release
- Network: SBS, NITV
- Release: September 2022

The Australian Wars (known internationally as First Wars) is a three-part 2022 documentary series about the Australian frontier wars, directed and narrated by Indigenous Australian filmmaker Rachel Perkins and made for SBS Television. Using interviews, re-enactments, archaeological research, and original documents, it explores massacres in Sydney, Tasmania, and Queensland.

The series received positive reviews, with a number of people calling it "essential viewing" for Australians. However, others have criticised it as exaggerating the number of Aboriginal deaths and promoting a political agenda. In response to the series, the Australian War Memorial announced it would work towards great inclusion of the violence against Indigenous Australians in its exhibitions. The series won the 2023 Silver Logie for Most Outstanding Factual or Documentary Program.

== Production ==
The series was directed and narrated by Rachel Perkins, a filmmaker of Arrernte and Kalkadoon lineage. It was produced by Blackfella Films for SBS, with investment from Screen Australia and financial support from Shark Island Foundation and Screen NSW. Perkins changed the title from First Wars after filming. Blackfella Films and SBS collaborated with an Aboriginal-led organisation called Culture is Life to publish educational resources using short clips from the series.

== Release ==
The series aired simultaneously on SBS and National Indigenous Television in September 2022. It was made available to stream on demand in Simplified Chinese, Arabic, Traditional Chinese, Vietnamese, and Korean, as well as English.

The Australian Wars was released internationally as First Wars. In November 2023, the series premiered in the United Kingdom on BBC Four.

== Summary ==
The series traces the Australian frontier wars from the landing of the First Fleet in 1788 until the 1920s. It explores the phases, locations and features of the wars, seeking to understand the tactics and strategies employed by both British and Aboriginal people, and asking why war was never declared. It focuses particularly on Aboriginal resistance to settlement, and explores the lives of those involved in the wars, as well as its impact and legacy on Australia today and what has been called "the great Australian silence" about many of the massacres. The first episode focuses on events in and around Sydney, the second episode solely on Tasmania, and the final episode looks at the formation of the native police corps in Queensland.

The series weaves together interviews with indigenous and non-indigenous historians including Marcia Langton and Henry Reynolds, re-enactments of events, study of colonial records, oral testimony from survivors' descendants and archaeological research. It includes investigation of the wars' impact on Aboriginal women, and their sexual exploitation. Perkins also revisited her own family's story, returning to the location of the massacre her grandmother survived on Arrernte Country in the Northern Territory, and including testimony from her grandmother recorded in the 1970s.

== Reception ==
Writing for The Conversation, Anne Maree Payne and Heidi Norman called the series "an important contribution to truth-telling" and a "public reckoning", while Ethan Floyd in Honi Soit called it "a crucial milestone in the process of truth-telling". The Guardian's Beejay Silcox called it "a hymn to memory – a work of candour, dignity and humane grace." Reece Goodwin, film and TV curator at the Australian Centre for the Moving Image, named it in his five favourite TV shows of 2022, saying it "should be essential viewing for all Australians".

However it was criticised in some quarters for its content. Chris Battle, writing for Quadrant, called the series "propaganda on the taxpayer dollar". Author Peter O'Brien called "a new myth" the claim "that the Aborigines [sic] fought a series of sustained wars of resistance".

The series calls on the Australian War Memorial, who had previously rejected including the frontier wars in its exhibitions, to acknowledge and recognise those who died during the conflicts. In an episode of the series, the War Memorial's director Matt Anderson says it was conceived to represent military activity overseas, not within Australia. A week after the series premiered, however, the War Memorial's outgoing chair, former government minister Brendan Nelson, announced the Memorial's governing council would work towards a "much broader, a much deeper depiction and presentation of the violence committed against Indigenous people, initially by British, then by pastoralists, then by police, and then by Aboriginal militia". In response to the announcement, Perkins said, "In the making of our series, we worked closely with the War Memorial ... [but] I never saw this coming. I thought, 'Maybe in a generation'... but not right now ... It is a watershed moment in Australian history. It can't be underestimated, the change that this heralds." Liberal senator Matt Canavan argued that the proposal is beyond the charter of the War Memorial under the Australian War Memorial Act; however, Anderson said the War Memorial has discretion to do so, and has previously included galleries covering "colonial" battles.

== Ratings ==
The premiere episode on 21 September 2022 was SBS' highest-rated program with 154,000 viewers overnight. The final episode on 5 October had a viewing audience of 147,000 on overnight ratings, rising to 335,000 on daily consolidated ratings.

== Awards and nominations ==
Perkins and Reynolds were jointly awarded the 2022 Annual History Citation Award by the History Council of New South Wales "for their outstanding contributions to the research, writing and filmmaking of Australian (Frontier) Wars history and for communicating history to broad audiences." Casting director Anousha Zarkesh won the 2022 Casting Guild of Australia Award for 'Achievement in Casting' for the series.

The series won Best Documentary/Factual Series at the 3rd Australian International Documentary Conference Awards in March 2023, with the jury statement saying "From the opening minutes, we all agreed that The Australian Wars stood out as a superbly crafted piece of television. But as those opening minutes went by, it quickly became apparent how such masterful craftsmanship was serving a story of far-reaching significance."

The Australian Wars won the Silver Logie for Most Outstanding Factual or Documentary Program, an award chosen by a television industry jury, at the Logie Awards of 2023.

The script, by Jacob Hickey, Rachel Perkins and Don Watson, was shortlisted for the Betty Roland Prize for Scriptwriting at the 2023 New South Wales Premier's Literary Awards. The film was a finalist for the 2023 Screen Diversity and Inclusion (SDIN) Award at the 21st Annual Screen Producers Australia Awards.

Episode 1 won the 2023 Digital History Prize, New South Wales Premier's History Awards, recognising the work of Perkins, Darren Dale, Hickey and Watson and Blackfella Films.

The series was the winner of the AACTA Award for Best Documentary or Factual Program in 2024.
