= The Tall Man (2011 film) =

- Film poster
- Directed by: Tony Krawitz
- Written by: Tony Krawitz
- Produced by: Darren Dale
- Cinematography: Germain McMicking
- Edited by: Rochelle Oshlack
- Music by: David McCormack; Antony Partos
- Distributed by: Blackfella Films
- Release date: 2 March 2011 (Adelaide)
- Running time: 78 minutes
- Country: Australia
- Language: English

The Tall Man is a 2011 Australian documentary film directed by Tony Krawitz. It is about the death of Cameron "Mulrunji" Doomadgee in police custody on Great Palm Island, Palm Islands, Queensland, Australia, on 19 November 2004.

The film premiered at the 2011 Adelaide Film Festival on 2 March 2011.

== Synopsis ==
The Tall Man explores the community reaction and events surrounding the death of Cameron Doomadgee, a 36-year-old Palm Island man who, while walking home intoxicated singing his favourite song Who Let the Dogs Out?, was arrested for harassing and attacking public bystanders. Doomadgee was arrested by Sergeant Chris Hurley, or 'the tall man', and was 45 minutes later found dead in police custody with his liver almost split in two, four broken ribs, a ruptured spleen, severe bruising to his head and a torn portal vein. The police claimed that his death was caused by him tripping on a step and colluded to protect Chris Hurley from facing any charges over the incident.

In response to the news that police were claiming Doomadgee's death was the result of an accidental fall, up to 200 Palm Islanders rioted and burnt down the local police station, adjoining courthouse and police barracks. 80 reinforcement police officers carrying machine guns were flown in by helicopter to the island and 28 locals were arrested. Almost all of the 28 locals served jail sentences.

Due to media attention and public protests, manslaughter charges were laid against Chris Hurley, making him the first police officer in Australian history to even have to appear in court for the death of an Aboriginal Australian in police custody.

Believing themselves to be above the law and not required to be accountable for their actions, police around Australia staged protests demanding that Chris Hurley should not face prosecution. Although Chris Hurley was found not guilty at his trial, a final inquest by Coroner Brian Hine delivered an open finding, that Doomadgee was assaulted, but police collusion on evidence meant that he could not determine if the death was deliberate or accidental.

== Cast ==
- Tracey Twaddle as herself
- Andrew Boe as himself
- Murrandoo Yanner as himself
- TJ Yanner as himself
- Erykah Kyle as herself
- Lloyd Doomadgee as himself
- Elizabeth Doomadgee as herself
- Jane Doomadgee as herself
- Tony Koch as himself
- Clinton Leahy as himself

== Production ==
=== Script ===
The film's script was based on the book The Tall Man by Chloe Hooper.

=== Casting ===
The film aims to include Aboriginal Australians telling their own stories in their own voices, in accordance with Blackfella Films's main objective.

Despite months of negotiations, the Queensland Police Service declined to be involved and no members of the Queensland Police were willing to be interviewed.

It is telling, I think, that the Commissioner of Police in Queensland still doesn't feel that he needs to talk, on the record, about one of the most important moments in race relations in our current history. That no one felt the need to give even a simple interview. I think that mirror is too big to hold up.

— Darren Dale, The Sydney Morning Herald.

== Release ==
The film premiered at the 2011 edition of the Adelaide Film Festival on 2 March 2011, and was also selected for the Toronto International Film Festival in the same year, before being released in cinemas across Australia by Hopscotch/eOne from 17 November 2011. It was first broadcast on SBS Television in 2012.

It was shown on 1 May 2021 on NITV, and thereafter streaming on SBS On Demand.

== Reviews ==
Margaret Pomeranz described The Tall Man as "one of the most explosive stories of our time".

== Awards ==
Ceremony	Category	Result
AWGIE Awards	Best Public Broadcast Documentary	Won
imagineNATIVE Film + Media Arts Festival	Best Documentary	Won
Walkley Awards	Best Long-form Journalism Documentary	Won
AACTA Awards 2012	Best Feature Length Documentary	Nominated
AACTA Awards 2012	Best Direction in a Documentary	Nominated
AACTA Awards 2012	Best Cinematography in a Documentary	Nominated
AACTA Awards 2012	Best Editing in a Documentary	Nominated

In 2014 the film was selected by the Australian Directors Guild for entry to the Directors Guild of America's Directors Finder Series.

== See also ==
- 2004 Palm Island death in custody
- Aboriginal deaths in custody
- Institutional Racism
- Blackfella Films
