= Total Control (TV series) =

Australian political drama television series (2019–2024)

- Genre: Political drama Political thriller
- Written by: Stuart Page; Angela Betzien; Pip Karmel
- Directed by: Rachel Perkins (s1); Wayne Blair (s2&3); Jub Clerc (s3)
- Starring: Tre Burles; Rachel Griffiths; Rob Collins; Wayne Blair; Trisha Morton-Thomas; Lisa Flanagan
- Country of origin: Australia
- Original language: English
- No. of series: 3
- No. of episodes: 18

Production
- Executive producers: Rachel Griffiths; Kelrick Martin; Sally Riley
- Producers: Darren Dale; Miranda Dear (s1 only)
- Running time: 60 minutes
- Production company: Blackfella Films

Original release
- Network: ABC
- Release: 13 October 2019 – 18 February 2024

Total Control is an Australian television political drama series first screened on ABC TV in October 2019. Season 2 began airing on 7 November 2021, and the final season premiered on the ABC on 14 January 2024.

== Premise ==
Alex Irving is an indigenous woman who finds herself the centre of media attention following her actions in a high-risk situation. The Prime Minister of Australia, Rachel Anderson, recruits Alex to become a federal Senator, so as to boost Rachel's popularity and further her own agenda.

There are several storylines and characters, including Alex's son, her mother, an ex-lover and rival clans in Winton, Queensland, her activist brother, various other players in the Canberra political and office sphere, and a young woman who has escaped youth detention with some footage which could severely damage the Anderson government.

The government in Series 1 and 2 appears to depict Liberal-National coalition, with various factions and other parties mimicking contemporary ones in Australia. The government in Series 3 appears to depict Labor.

== Cast and characters ==
=== Main ===
- Deborah Mailman as Alexandra "Alex" Irving, a Liberal National Party of Queensland Senator for Queensland (Series 1) and then independent MP for the seat of Freeman, Queensland (Series 2 and 3).
- Rachel Griffiths as Rachel Anderson, the Liberal Prime Minister of Australia (Series 1) and then independent MP for the seat of North Sydney, New South Wales (Series 2 and 3).
- Rob Collins as Charlie Irving, Alex's brother who worked as a university lecturer in Sydney (Series 1), Alex's campaign manager for the seat of Freeman (Series 2), and Prime Minister Murphy’s Director of Policy (Series 3).
- Wesley Patten as Eddie Irving, Alex's son.
- Steph Tisdell as Joely McKinnon, Alex’s communications specialist (Series 2) turned senior advisor (Series 3).
- Wayne Blair as Paul Murphy, a Labor MP from New South Wales who later becomes the first Indigenous Prime Minister of Australia (Series 2 and 3).
- Anthony Hayes as Damien Bauer, the Liberal-National Minister for Immigration (Series 1), Prime Minister of Australia (Series 2), and Leader of the Opposition (Series 3).
- Huw Higginson as Peter Solomon, Chief of Staff to Prime Minister Anderson (Series 1), to Prime Minister Bauer (Series 2), and to independent MP Anderson (Series 3).
- Harry Richardson as Jonathan Cosgrove, former staffer in the Prime Minister's Office and chief advisor to Senator Irving (Series 1).
- William McInnes as Laurie Martin, Leader of the Australian Labor Party and Leader of the Opposition (Series 1 and 2).

=== Recurring ===
- Trisha Morton-Thomas as Jan Irving, Alex's mother (Series 1 and 3).
- Lisa Flanagan as Faye Stanley, Alex’s cousin.
- Malaki Williams as Clancy Stanley, Faye’s son (Series 2 and 3).
- Daniela Farinacci as Philippa Bailey, an independent MP from Smithvale, South Australia (Series 2) and later Speaker of the Australian House of Representatives (Series 3).
- Anita Hegh as Helena Rossi, a Coalition MP (Series 2) turned independent for Lennox (Series 3), New South Wales and daughter of Howard Clyde, a former MP.
- Benedict Hardie as Shaun Keogh, Australian Greens MP for Tucker in Melbourne (Series 2 and 3).
- Fran Kelly as herself (audio only).
- Patricia Karvelas as herself (audio only).

==== Series 1 ====
- David Roberts as Kevin Cartwright, Minister for Indigenous Affairs
- Val Weldon as Marcie Maclean, an inmate at the Macauley Detention Centre who is killed by a guard
- Shantae Barnes Cowan as Jess Clarke, an inmate at the Macauley Detention Centre who escapes after her friend is killed
- Celia Ireland as Tracey Helliar, Senator Irving’s office manager.
- Adele Perovic as Jillian Morell, Senator Irving’s social media strategist.
- James Sweeny as Christopher Bingham, Minister Cartwright’s advisor.
- Tony Barry as Phillip Anderson, Rachel's father
- Aaron Pedersen as Tom Campbell Jnr., a friend and former flame of Alex.
- Sacha Horler as Kelly Campbell, Tom’s wife.
- Gibson John as Tom Campbell Sr., Tom’s father.
- Luke Carroll as Rob, a member of Alex's extended family.
- Rebecca Massey as Sharon, a Child and Youth Protection Services worker in Canberra

==== Series 2 ====
- Alex Dimitriades as Nick Pearce, a think tank operator.
- Harry Greenwood as Leo Jacobs, Alex’s data analytics specialist.
- Colin Friels as Jack Ramsay, the incumbent Coalition MP for the seat of Freeman, Queensland.
- Jason King as Scott McNally, the Labor candidate for the seat of Freeman, Queensland.
- Angela Fitzpatrick as Gloria Vincent, the independent Christian candidate for the seat of Freeman, Queensland.
- Tasneem Roc as Mima Scott, the Coalition candidate for the seat of North Sydney, New South Wales.
- Rob Carlton as George Jeffries, a long-serving and controversial independent MP from Illingworth, Western Australia.
- Vico Thai as Justin Yang, independent MP for Foster, Western Australia.
- John Derum as Father Harry Woods, a religious left candidate.
- Tom Dawson as Henry Whittaker, a political staffer in Prime Minister Bauer's media office who has been engaged in a racially motivated hate campaign against Alex under the pseudonym 'Bait15'.
- Hamish MacDonald as himself.
- Eve Morey as Cassie.
- Fletcher Humphrys as Joshua Harvey.

==== Series 3 ====
- Lisa Hensley as Sharon Costigan, Prime Minister Murphy’s Chief of Staff.
- Rosie Lourde as Dee Rhodes, Charlie’s partner and staffer at the Department of Foreign Affairs and Trade.
- Catherine McClements as Marion Beaumont, an investigative journalist.
- Fayssal Bazzi as Matthew Kohli, a moderate Coalition MP who contemplates joining Rachel’s Independent Alliance.
- Maya Stange as Kathleen Sloane, a billionaire.
- Paul Winchester as Andrew Liddell, a Labor MP opposed to Murphy’s leadership.
- Josef Ber as Dominic, Alex’s driver.
- Maliyan Blair as Jay, Eddie’s friend.
- Nicole Milinkovic as Tegan, Prime Minister Murphy’s secretary.
- Paul Goddard as Counsel Assisting.

== Episodes ==
=== Series overview ===
Series	Episodes	Originally released	
Series	Episodes	First released	Last released
1	6	13 October 2019	17 November 2019
2	6	7 November 2021	12 December 2021
3	6	14 January 2024	18 February 2024

=== Series 1 (2019) ===
No. in series	Title	Directed by	Written by	Original release date	Australia viewers (millions)
1	"Episode 1"	Rachel Perkins	Stuart Page	13 October 2019	0.722
Following a stand-off with a gunman outside a local courthouse, Alex Irving becomes a household name overnight and is offered a casual vacancy in the Senate of Australia by the Prime Minister, Rachel Anderson, who has her own motivations for wanting Alex in her ranks. Meanwhile, Jess Clarke, a young Indigenous girl escapes from a youth detention centre after her friend, Marcie, is murdered by a prison guard.
2	"Episode 2"	Rachel Perkins	Kim Wilson & Rachel Perkins	20 October 2019	0.641
Alex is tasked by Rachel with negotiating a deal between the native title holders of Winton and the Federal Government after the United States requests the construction of a new military base in the region. Meanwhile, Jess hitch-hikes across the country in an effort to reach Alex in Canberra.
3	"Episode 3"	Rachel Perkins	Pip Karmel	27 October 2019	0.679
As Alex works around the clock to get the community's deal before the Senate, there is opposition within the party and a coup threatens Rachel's leadership. Jess arrives in Canberra, but Alex is faced with simultaneous betrayal in Canberra and a tragedy in Winton before they can meet.
4	"Episode 4"	Rachel Perkins	Angela Betzien	3 November 2019	0.712
Following the death of her mother, Alex is struck low by grief and anger after the betrayal of her and the community. When she discovers the extent of the Rachel's deception, she resolves to return to Canberra - planning to burn everything to the ground.
5	"Episode 5"	Rachel Perkins	Stuart Page	10 November 2019	0.683
Returning to Canberra, Alex and Rachel embark on a game of political cat and mouse. Alex knows the only person who can help her now is Jess, but when they finally arrange to meet in Sydney, Jess gets spooked when police suddenly arrive and runs - leading to tragedy.
6	"Episode 6"	Rachel Perkins	Stuart Page	17 November 2019	0.712
In pursuit of justice for Jess and Marcie, Alex declares war on her own party. Faced again with Rachel's double dealing, she engineers a plan that could have catastrophic consequences for the government.

=== Series 2 (2021) ===
No. in series	Title	Directed by	Written by	Original release date	Australia viewers (millions)
7	"Episode 1"	Wayne Blair	Stuart Page	7 November 2021	N/A
Far from home, Alex Irving faces the reality of her alliances with Damien Bauer, who is now the Prime Minister, and with Laurie Martin and begins to question her future in her new party. Still reeling from the coup, Rachel plans her next move.
8	"Episode 2"	Wayne Blair	Pip Karmel	14 November 2021	N/A
Alex returns home to Winton, determined to get her grassroots campaign off the ground. Rachel makes a surprise announcement that sees her facing off with Alex on live television. After the show, Rachel makes Alex an interesting offer.
9	"Episode 3"	Wayne Blair	Larissa Behrendt	21 November 2021	N/A
Alex's success on the campaign trail has caught the attention of popular incumbent Jack Ramsay and he's not going down without a fight. Rachel's bid for re-election gets a boost when she attends a rival's campaign event.
10	"Episode 4"	Wayne Blair	Angela Betzien	28 November 2021	N/A
It's the day of the election, and Alex and her team make a final push to win over the voters of Freeman, but a family emergency sends the campaign into chaos. Meanwhile, Rachel prepares to face off against Damien.
11	"Episode 5"	Wayne Blair	Nakkiah Lui	5 December 2021	N/A
Following the election, the high stakes horse-trading begins in Canberra as Alex and a small group of independent MPs meet to decide the future of the nation. With bigger threats looming, Alex and Rachel will need to find a way to trust each other.
12	"Episode 6"	Wayne Blair	Stuart Page	12 December 2021	N/A
Alex is on the cusp of rewriting history when the forces of violence and reaction make one last bloody attempt to stop her.

=== Series 3 (2024) ===
No. in series	Title	Directed by	Written by	Original release date	Australia viewers (millions)
13	"Episode 1"	Wayne Blair	Stuart Page	14 January 2024	0.278
Two years on since the explosive events of the second season, outsider turned kingmaker, Alex Irving, is now completely at home in the nation's capital. She's at the centre of power, holding the Government on a short leash, but it's taking a toll.
14	"Episode 2"	Wayne Blair	Stuart Page	21 January 2024	0.235
Alex receives a health diagnosis which threatens to derail her political ambitions. Rachel learns some shocking news about her campaign finance from journalist Marion Beaumont.
15	"Episode 3"	Jub Clerc	Julia Moriarty	28 January 2024	0.353
At a Parliamentary event, Rachel gathers the numbers for her alliance, while a serious health scare throws Alex's entire future into jeopardy.
16	"Episode 4"	Jub Clerc	Meyne Wyatt	4 February 2024	0.408
Alex makes an unsavoury deal with a political rival on a nation-changing piece of legislation. Charlie reaches breaking point
17	"Episode 5"	Jub Clerc	Pip Karmel	11 February 2024	0.420
Determined to reform youth justice, Alex pushes forward with her radical plan in the House of Representatives. Rachel seizes the opportunity for her own advantage.
18	"Episode 6"	Wayne Blair	Stuart Page	18 February 2024	0.414
The fate of Alex and Rachel's political careers becomes clear in a final power play which will shape the future of Australia's democracy.

== Production ==
The working title of the series was Black Bitch, and it was shown at the 2019 Toronto International Film Festival with this title; however, it was changed after complaints that the title was a racial slur. The first season was written by Stuart Page, Angela Betzien, Pip Karmel and directed by Rachel Perkins. It was co-produced by Perkins, along with Darren Dale and Miranda Dear of Blackfella Films, who also co-produced the first season Rachel Griffiths, Kelrick Martin and Sally Riley as executive producers. The six-part first season was filmed in Canberra, Sydney, and Winton in Central West Queensland. New music was written and recorded by Missy Higgins and featured in the series.

Season 2 was directed by cast member Wayne Blair, while writing credits include Stuart Page, Larissa Behrendt, Angela Betzien, Pip Karmel, and Nakkiah Lui. Some scenes were filmed on location in Parliament House, Canberra as well as Sydney and Broken Hill. Darren Dale produced the second and third series.

Production for the third and final series was announced on 31 May 2023. Wayne Blair co-directed with Jub Clerc.

== Release ==
In advance of the broadcast premiere of Season 1 on ABC TV in October 2019, several episodes of the series received a preview screening in the Primetime program of the 2019 Toronto International Film Festival.

Season 2 aired from 7 November 2021.

The final season premiered on the ABC on 14 January 2024. The final episode aired on the ABC on 18 February 2024.

== Critical reception ==
The first season received mixed to positive reviews from critics. The dialogue, writing, relationships between the characters, and Alex's characterisation were widely praised, but recurring criticisms were that the series lacked action and the storytelling was too meek and subdued despite its intense subject matter. However, the cast's performances received critical acclaim, especially Deborah Mailman's.

The series has an approval rating of 100% percent for its first season on the review aggregator website Rotten Tomatoes indicating critical acclaim.

Craig Mathieson of The Sydney Morning Herald wrote "It's hard to remember the last time an Australian drama had dialogue as biting, juicy, and telling as the lines that ricochet back and forth – simultaneously revealing power and defining personalities" and that Mailman gives a "full-tilt and full-bodied performance". Luke Buckmaster of The Guardian said "There are times when it feels like we may be in store for a Bulworth-style spectacle, revolving around a shoot-from-the-hips political newbie with nothing to lose. However, the drama in Total Control is meeker than that, and the stakes feel surprisingly low, given several hot-button issues explored". Buckmaster praised the performances of both Mailman and Trisha Morton-Thomas. He declared Mailman's performance to be "superb" and said that she was the series' "one unquestionably outstanding element".

Chris Boyd from Screenhub wrote: "As an action drama, Total Control is unconvincing and poorly executed. As a political thriller, it's sketchy and forced. The Canberra intrigue is shallow to the point of parody." However he praised the performances of both Mailman and Rob Collins. When it comes to Mailman's performance he said "Increasingly blunt, and foul-mouthed, Mailman is electrifying. Tectonic. Unforgettable." Laura Brodnik from Mamamia gave the series a positive review saying "with a cutting and topical script, this is a series that secures a spot as one of the best Australian offerings of the year". Brodnik praised most of the cast but singled out Mailman and Shantae Barnes Cowan for the most praise. She called Mailman's performance a "stand out". And said Barnes Cowan "delivers some of the shows most emotional moments in scenes that are light on dialogue, so it's left up to her facial expressions to convey the gravity of what is really going on".

Dorothy Rabinowitz of The Wall Street Journal wrote a glowing review, saying this about the series "It's an enterprise mightily enlarged by its merciless focus on political combat, its depiction of longtime trusted alliances, its biting vision of the prevailing codes, and what passes for right and wrong in political society." James Croot from Stuff NZ wrote: "Total Control offers a scathing examination of Australian politics [and] a clarion call for social justice." He went on to praise the series' music, saying it was "a magnificent showcase for the songwriting and singing skills of Missy Higgins", Alex's characterisation ("Her character is a compelling, complex and charismatic presence, a woman passionate about representing her community, but still traumatised by the event that made her public property") and Rachel Griffiths' performance ("Griffiths is impressive as the embattled Prime Minister, struggling to keep her party (and herself) in power – two goals that aren’t necessarily the same thing."). Joel Keller from Decider praised the writing of the series, saying "The writing in all of those scenes, is sharp and intelligent, not giving in to cliché or tropes" and that "the writing is smart enough to give its audience credit for having some brain cells to process the story". He added "after the ace performances by Mailman and Griffiths, we're looking forward to seeing what direction Total Control goes in".
