= Blood Brothers (film series) =

- Directed by: Ned Lander; Trevor Graham
- Written by: Ned Lander; Rachel Perkins; Trevor Graham; Marcia Langton
- Produced by: Barbara Mariotti; Ned Lander; Rachel Perkins; Jenny Day
- Distributed by: Australian Broadcasting Corporation
- Release date: 1993
- Running time: 217 minutes
- Country: Australia
- Languages: English; Warlpiri

Blood Brothers is a 1993 four-part Australian documentary film series that tells the stories of three different Aboriginal Australian men (Max Stuart, Charles Perkins, and Kev Carmody), and an Aboriginal ceremony.

== Production ==
Screenwriting and direction was by Ned Lander, Rachel Perkins, Trevor Graham, and Marcia Langton, and it was produced by Lander and Perkins.

== Episodes ==
=== "Broken English" ===
"Broken English" is about Arrernte man Rupert Max Stuart who has always maintained his innocence of the rape and murder of a young white girl in 1958. He spent 14 years in prison and faced the gallows nine times for a crime he says he didn't commit. His story was the basis for the 2002 film Black and White.

"Broken English" was directed by Lander.

The running time is 55 minutes.

=== "Freedom Ride" ===
"Freedom Ride" is about Charles Perkins, one of the first Aboriginal people to graduate from university. He was also the leader of the 1965 freedom rides that challenged segregation practices in northern NSW.

This film was directed by Rachel Perkins.

The running time is 54 minutes.

=== "From Little Things, Big Things Grow" ===
"From Little Things, Big Things Grow" (title from the song of the same name) is about the life of Kev Carmody, whose 1989 album Pillars of Society established him as a prominent Australian protest musician.

This episode was written and directed by Trevor Graham.

The running time is 53 minutes.

=== "Jardiwarnpa – A Warlpiri Fire Ceremony" ===
"Jardiwarnpa – A Warlpiri Fire Ceremony", written by Marcia Langton and directed by Lander, is about the staging of a Warlpiri fire ceremony over several weeks and involving hundreds of people at Yuendumu in the Northern Territory. The ceremony is introduced by Darby Jampinjimpa Ross and other Warlpiri elders.

The running time is 57 minutes.
