= Jimi Bani =

Indigenous Australian actor

- Born: Australia
- Education: Western Australian Academy of Performing Arts (2007)
- Occupations: Stage and television actor
- Years active: 2006 – present
- Known for: Mabo (2022)

Jimi Bani is an Indigenous Australian actor, known for his portrayal of land rights activist Eddie Mabo in the 2012 tele-movie Mabo, several television series, and theatre performances.

== Early life and education ==
Bani is a Torres Strait Islander (Mabuiag Island) of the Wadagadum people, where his father was a tribal chief.

Bani was playing in the Queensland State basketball league in Cairns in 2004, when he answered a 'no experience needed' advertisement for actors to appear in the 2006 SBS drama miniseries RAN: Remote Area Nurse. He landed a main role in the series, alongside Susie Porter. Keen to further his acting career, he attended the Western Australian Academy of Performing Arts, where he studied alongside fellow actor Jai Courtney, graduating in 2007.

== Career ==
Directly after graduating from WAAPA, Bani scored a lead role in a world-premiere stage production of Jandamarra for Black Swan State Theatre Company at the 2008 Perth International Arts Festival. That same year, he appeared in Yibiyung for Company B and Malthouse Theatre. He then performed in Romeo and Juliet for Sydney Theatre Company and a stage version of The Sapphires in 2010, for the Black Swan State Theatre Company and Company B, touring internationally to London and Korea.

In 2012, Bani appeared in ABC1's series, The Straits as crime family member, Marou Montebello. He also landed the titular role of indigenous activist Eddie Koiko Mabo in biographical telemovie Mabo. Both series were nominated for awards. Later that year, Bani played Peter Gibson in the third episode of Redfern Now, an ABC1 six-part series produced by Blackfella Films.

From late 2013 through 2014, Bani performed in a stage production of The Shadow King for which he received a Helpmann Awards nomination. The play was produced by the Malthouse Theatre in association with the Confederation of Australian International Arts Festivals – Adelaide Festival, Brisbane Festival, Melbourne Festival, Perth International Arts Festival and Sydney Festival.

Bani was a member of Queensland Theatre's National Artistic Team, to assist Artistic Director Sam Strong with its 2017 season. That same year, he appeared in a Queensland Theatre production entitled My Name is Jimi, which he co-created with Jason Klarwein who also directed the production. The performers included members of his family in a performance which "... whisks you away to his island for an evening of music, dance, stand-up and storytelling. Four generations of one family take the stage, as Jimi’s grandmother, mother, son and brothers help him spin yarns of totems, traditions and childhood memories". The show was also performed at the Sydney Festival in 2018.

In early 2022, Bani delivered a critically acclaimed performance as George in a State Theatre Company South Australia production of Edward Albee's Who's Afraid of Virginia Woolf?. Later in 2022, Bani and Jason Klarwein staged an adaptation of Othello at Queensland Theatre, set in the Torres Straits. It was originally premiered at Cairns Indigenous Art Fair in 2021. Bani played Othello as a member of the Torres Straits Light Infantry Battalion during World War II. The production was staged in three languages; Kala Lagaw Ya, Yumplatok and English. Performing cultural songs and dances alongside Bani, were his three brothers.

In 2024, Bani voiced the character of Red, a kangaroo in the animated feature film The Lost Tiger.

Together with The Straits co-star, Aaron Fa'aoso, Bani runs Cairns film and television production company, Lone Star, teaching writing, directing, acting and cinematography to young people. The company has also produced numerous short films.

== Personal life ==
Bani is a father of five children with partner Idelia, and together they live in Cairns, Queensland. He has three brothers – Richard, Gabriel Bani and Conwell. Bani's great-grandfather was a member of the Torres Strait Light Infantry.

== Awards and nominations ==
Year	Work	Award	Category	Result	Ref.
2008	Jimi Bani	WA Equity Foundation	Best Newcomer	Nominated	
2009	Yibiyung	Helpmann Awards	Best Male Actor in a Supporting Role in a Play	Nominated	
2012	The Straits	Deadly Awards	Television Show of the Year (ensemble cast)	Won	
2012	The Straits	BOFA Awards	Best Actor	Won	
2012	Mabo	Deadly Awards	Film of the Year (ensemble cast)	Won	
2012	Mabo	Deadly Awards	Male Actor of the Year	Won	
2012	Mabo	BOFA Awards	Best Actor	Won	
2013	Mabo	AACTA Awards	Best Lead Actor in a Television Drama	Nominated	
2013	Mabo	Logie Awards	Silver Logie for Most Outstanding Actor	Nominated	
2013	Mabo	Equity Ensemble Awards	Outstanding Performance by an Ensemble in a Telemovie or Miniseries	Nominated	
2014	The Shadow King	Helpmann Award	Best Male Actor in a Supporting Role in a Play	Nominated	
2017		National Dreamtime Awards	Best Male Actor	Nominated	
2022	Who's Afraid of Virginia Woolf?	Matilda Awards	Best Performance in a Leading Role in a Mainstage Production	Won	

== Filmography ==
=== Film ===
Year	Title	Role	Type	Ref.
2017	A Thin Black Line	Voice	Documentary short film	
2024	The Lost Tiger	Red (voice)	Animated film	

=== Television ===
Year	Title	Role	Type	Ref.
2006	RAN: Remote Area Nurse	Solomon Gaibui	Miniseries, 6 episodes	
2007	Beautiful Music		Video short	
2012	The Straits	Marou Montebello	10 episodes	
2012	Mabo	Koiki Eddie Mabo	TV movie	
2012	Redfern Now	Peter Gibson	1 episode	
2012	The People Speak Australia	Priscilla Conway	Film documentary	
2015	Ready for This	Nat Brockman	2 episodes	
2016; 2020	Black Comedy	Officer Ed Scarlett / Regg / Uncle Jimmy	4 episodes	
2019	Blue Water Empire	Kebisu / Dupa / Wilfred Baira		
2022–2023	Black Snow	Joe Baker	6 episodes	

== Theatre ==
Year	Title	Role	Venue / Co.	Ref.
Pre-2008	A Dream Play	Poet	WAAPA	
Pre-2008	Three Sisters	Chebutykin	WAAPA	
Pre-2008	Stories from Suburban Road	Tom	WAAPA	
Pre-2008	The Winter's Tale	Florizel	WAAPA	
Pre-2008	The Country Remains	Mr Sparkish	WAAPA	
Pre-2008	Love & Human Remains	Robert	WAAPA	
Pre-2008	UnAustralia	Mannie	WAAPA	
2008	Jandamarra	Jandamarra	Perth Convention and Exhibition Centre with Black Swan State Theatre Company	
2008	Romeo and Juliet	Tybalt / Friar II	Wharf Theatre, Sydney with STC	
2008	Yibiyung	Smiley	Malthouse Theatre, Melbourne, Belvoir, Sydney	
2010	The Sapphires	Jimmy	Playhouse, Perth with Black Swan State Theatre Company, Scott Theatre, Adelaide, Belvoir, Sydney, London & Korea tour	
2011	Krakouer!	Jimmy	Clocktower Centre with Deckchair Theatre	
2013	Peter Pan	John / Pirate I / The Crocodile	Belvoir, Sydney	
2013		Playwrighting Australia	Various roles	National Script Workshop Canberra
2013	The Dragon	Lancelot	Malthouse Theatre, Melbourne	
Half and Half	Ned	Cairns Centre of Contemporary Arts with Jute Theatre Company		
2013–2014	The Shadow King	Edmund	Australian tour	l
2015	Storm Boy	Fingerbone Bill	Australian tour with STC	
2016	The Shadow King	Edmund	Barbican Theatre, London with Malthouse Theatre	
2016	Title and Deed	The Traveller	Belvoir St Theatre, Sydney	l
2017–2018	My Name is Jimi	Jimi	Australian tour with QTC	
2018	Hedda	Ejlert Lovborg	Bille Brown Theatre, Brisbane with QTC	
2020	Othello	Othello	Cairns Indigenous Art Fair & Bille Brown Theatre, Brisbane with QTC	
2022	Who's Afraid of Virginia Woolf?	George	Dunstan Playhouse with STCSA	
2022	The Return	Warrior	Malthouse Theatre, Melbourne	
2023	Every Brilliant Thing	Narrator	STCSA	
2025	A Few Good Men		QPAC, Brisbane with QTC	
2025–2026	Dear Son	Reader 2	Bille Brown Theatre, Brisbane, Odeon Theatre, Adelaide, Belvoir, Sydney with QTC & STCSA	
