= First Contact (Australian TV series) =

- Genre: Reality television Documentary
- Written by: Jacob Hickey
- Directed by: Ronan Sharkey & Dora Weekley (s1); David Grusovin & Bruce Permezel (s2)
- Presented by: Ray Martin
- Narrated by: Hugo Weaving
- Composers: Matteo Zingales; Russel Thornton
- Country of origin: Australia
- Original language: English
- No. of seasons: 2
- No. of episodes: 6

Production
- Executive producers: Rachel Perkins (s1); Jacob Hickey (s2)
- Producers: Darren Dale; Jacob Hickey
- Cinematography: Nicola Daley; Bonnie Elliott; Micah Walker
- Editors: Steven Robinson; Mark AtkinASE
- Running time: ≥ 52 minutes 60 minutes (inc.adverts)
- Production company: Blackfella Films

Original release
- Network: SBS One
- Release: 18 November 2014 – 1 December 2016

First Contact is an Australian reality television documentary series that aired on SBS One, SBS Two and NITV from November 2014. A second season aired in 2016. The show, produced by Blackfella Films and presented by Ray Martin, takes six European Australians on a journey across Australia, challenging their preconceived ideas about Indigenous Australians. In the second season, the non-Indigenous participants are all well-known Australians.

== Synopsis ==
The show documents the journey of six European Australians who are challenged over a period of 28 days about their pre-existing perceptions of Indigenous Australians.

First Contact shows some of the cultural divisions that exist between Indigenous and non-Indigenous Australians, and highlights the lack of awareness many non-Indigenous Australians have about Indigenous Australians and the various different cultures and lifestyles they currently maintain. A stated premise is that 60% of European Australian have never had any contact with Indigenous people, a statistic that may explain the prevalence of the racist, unsympathetic and generally prejudicial attitudes that are often directed towards Indigenous Australians.

In making their "first contact" with Indigenous Australia, the selected six participants are taken to Aboriginal communities both in the city and the country, and are even processed into a regional prison at Roebourne in Western Australia, where social problems are particularly acute, resulting in incarceration of large numbers of Indigenous Australians, often for quite minor offences. The relationships between Indigenous people and local police in Roebourne are notoriously poor.

== Cast ==
(As themselves)

=== Participants 2014 ===
Series 1 participants were:

- Alice Lardner
- Bo-Dene Steiler
- Jasmine Johnston
- Trent Giles
- Sandy Clifford
- Marcus Solomon

=== Major Indigenous contributors 2014 ===
Indigenous contributors on series 2 included:

- Sharyn Derschow – Co-founder Linkidge Cross Communication Training Company
- Margaret Gudumurrkuwuy – Elcho Island Arts
- Marmingee Hand – School Teacher & Foster Carer for F.A.S.D children
- Marcus Lacey – traditional owner, Teacher & Tourist Business Operator
- Debra Maidment – Safe & Sober Support Service Program, Central Australia Aboriginal Congress
- Victor Morgan – Senior Educator, Education Centre Against Violence & Chair Link-Up NSW
- June Oscar AO – CEO Marninwarntikura Women’s Resource Centre
- Emily Carter – Deputy CEO Marninwarntikura Women's Resource Centre
- Shane Phillips – CEO Tribal Warrior & Local Australian of the Year 2013
- Geraldine Stewart – Yipirinya School HIPPY Coordinator
- Tangentyere Council Night Patrol

=== Participants 2016 ===
Participants in the second series were:

- Natalie Imbruglia
- Ian Dickson
- David Oldfield
- Tom Ballard
- Renae Ayris
- Nicki Wendt

== Production ==
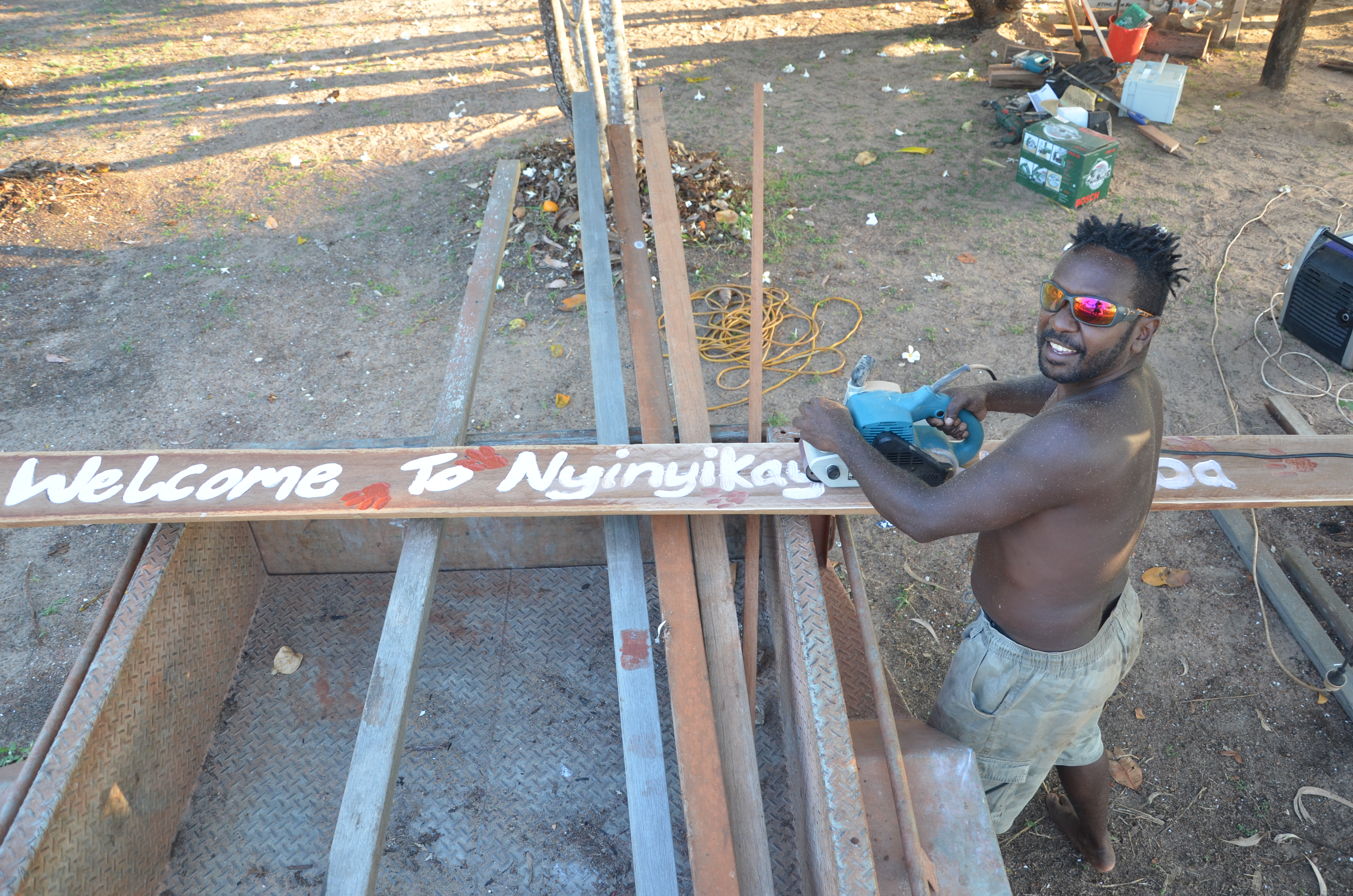
Marcus Lacey in Nyinyikay in the Northern Territory

First Contact was filmed and set in New South Wales, home to the largest Indigenous Australian population of any state/territory, the Northern Territory, where Indigenous Australians make up a higher percentage of the population than in any other state or territory and Western Australia.

Darren Dale of Blackfella Films produced both series, while Jacob Hickey was series producer and writer for both. Rachel Perkins was executive producer on the first series, while Ronan Sharkey and Dora Weekley directed. Jacob Hickey was executive producer on the second series, while David Grusovin and Bruce Permezel directed.

== Broadcast ==
First Contact aired on SBS One, SBS Two, and NITV, from 18 November 2014.

== Discussion ==
After the first series aired, First Contact was the topic of an Insight episode, hosted by Stan Grant and featuring a discussion involving many of the people who were involved in the show.

== Series overview ==
No.	Original air	Consolidated Australian viewers (Mainland Capitals)
1	18 November 2014	508,000
2	19 November 2014	401,000
3	20 November 2014	452,000

The show is estimated to have had a cumulative reach of 1,847,000 Australian viewers.

Season	Episodes	Originally aired		DVD release	DVD features
Season	Episodes	Season premiere	Season finale	Region 4	+
1	10	18 November 2014	20 November 2014	3 December 2014	Single Disc; Running time: 156 minutes

== Episodes ==
=== Season 1 (2014) ===
No.	Title	Directed by	Original release date
1	"Episode 1"	Ronan Sharkey and Dora Weekley	18 November 2014
2	"Episode 2"	Ronan Sharkey and Dora Weekley	19 November 2014
3	"Episode 3"	Ronan Sharkey and Dora Weekley	20 November 2014

=== Season 2 (2016) ===
No.	Title	Directed by	Original release date
4	"Episode 1"	David Grusovin and Bruce Permezel	18 November 2016
5	"Episode 2"	David Grusovin and Bruce Permezel	30 November 2016
6	"Episode 3"	David Grusovin and Bruce Permezel	1 December 2016

== Adaptations ==
The series was adapted for Canadian television by APTN, which premiered First Contact in 2018.

== See also ==
- Go Back to Where You Came From
- Filthy Rich and Homeless
