= Paul Goddard (actor) =

British-Australian actor

- Born: Paul David Goddard; Reading, Berkshire, UK
- Education: National Institute of Dramatic Art (1984); University of Sydney (1993)
- Occupation: Actor
- Known for: Sons and Daughters; Farscape

Paul Goddard is a British-Australian actor. He is best known for his roles as Stark in the television series Farscape and Agent Brown in the film The Matrix.

== Early life ==
Paul was born in Reading, England and migrated to New Zealand at the age of 10. He then relocated to Australia in 1982 at the age of 19, to study acting at prestigious Sydney acting school National Institute of Dramatic Art (NIDA), where he received a Diploma of Dramatic Art (Acting) in 1984.

== Career ==
Goddard played Agent Brown in the 1999 film The Matrix, and Stark in the science fiction television series Farscape, after having auditioned for the role of Scorpius.

He has appeared in other films, including The Everlasting Secret Family (1988), Babe (1995), Mighty Morphin Power Rangers: The Movie (1995) and Holding the Man (2015), as well as numerous television series including Sons and Daughters, The Lost World, All Saints and more recently, Total Control and Home and Away.

Goddard also worked as an acting coach on the Australian reality television show Australia's Next Top Model in 2007.

In 2007 he released his first album of original material, "2am Flight".

Since 2013, Goddard has worked at leadership and communication coaching business, Duncan Young Consulting as an Associate.

== Personal life ==
From 1989, Goddard studied at University of Sydney where he graduated in 1993 with a Bachelor of Economics/Social Sciences.

== Filmography ==
=== Film ===
Year	Title	Role	Notes
1987	Bullseye	Harry Walford	
1988	The Everlasting Secret Family	Son	
1991	Dead to the World	Bobby	
1995	Mighty Morphin Power Rangers: The Movie	Construction Worker	
1995	Babe	Son-in-Law	
1995	Billy's Holiday	Gary 'Stylist'	
1999	The Matrix	Agent Brown	
1999	Holy Smoke!	Tim Barron	
2001	Hildegarde	Dad	
2013	Did I Tell You 'Bout Jasper?	Hank	Short film
2015	Holding the Man	Father Woods	

=== Television ===
Year	Title	Role	Notes
1985	Sons and Daughters	Simon Armstrong	10 episodes
1986	Barnum!		TV movie
1991	A Country Practice	Gareth Shillington	2 episodes
1995	G.P.	Terry	1 episode
1996	Hart to Hart: Harts in High Season	Harry	TV movie
1997	Big Sky	Jeff	1 episode
1999	Bondi Banquet	Gerry Svorecki	
2000	Water Rats	Rob	2 episodes
2001	The Lost World	Lawrence	1 episode
2002	All Saints	Ross Fowler	1 episode
2000–2003	Farscape	Stark	35 episodes
2004	Farscape: The Peacekeeper Wars	Stark	Miniseries, 2 episodes
2007	BlackJack: Ghosts	Charles Hulce	TV movie
2016	Deep Water	Jeremy	Miniseries, 2 episodes
2017	Top of the Lake	Richard	2 episodes
2017	Pulse	Head Surgeon	Miniseries, 1 episode
2020	Halifax: Retribution	Newsreader	2 episodes
2024	Total Control	Counsel Assisting	1 episode
2024	Home and Away	Prosecutor	2 episodes

== Theatre ==
Year	Title	Role	Notes
1983	Peer Gynt	Peer Gynt	NIDA Theatre, Sydney
1983	A Midsummer Night’s Dream	Bottom	NIDA Theatre, Sydney
1984	Welcome the Bright World	Heinitz / Schumann	NIDA Theatre, Sydney
1984	Pericles & The Comedy of Errors	Antipholus	NIDA Theatre, Sydney, Playhouse, Canberra, Community Arts Theatre, Newcastle
1984	Street Scene		NIDA Theatre, Sydney
1985	The Taming of the Shrew		Shakespeare in the Park
1985	Rents	Phil	Wharf Theatre, Sydney, Playhouse, Adelaide, Universal Theatre, Melbourne with The Gordon Frost Organisation
1986	Pravda	Miles Foley / Clivedon Wicker-Basket / Larry Punt / Singo Boy / Young Journalist	Playhouse, Adelaide
1987	Blood Relations	Kit	Sydney Opera House, Playhouse, Adelaide with STCSA & Sydney Theatre Company (STC)
1986; 1987	Away	Tom / Rick	Studio Theatre, Melbourne, regional Victoria tour with Playbox Theatre Company
1988	The Mortal Falcon	Alonzo	Wharf Theatre, Sydney, with STC
1988	The Game of Love and Chance	Mario	Wharf Theatre, Sydney, with STC
1988	An Ideal Husband	George	Wharf Theatre, Sydney, with STC
1988	Rough Crossing	Adam Adam	Playhouse, Adelaide, Sydney Opera House, Playhouse, Canberra with Gary Penny Productions & STCSA
1990	Hot Fudge and Icecream	Phil / Various roles	Wharf Theatre, Sydney, Gary Penny Productions with STC
1991	The Revenger's Tragedy	Dondolo	Sydney Opera House with STC
1991	Racing Demon	Ewan Gilmour	Wharf Theatre, Sydney, with STC
1992	Time and the Room	Various roles	Wharf Theatre, Sydney, with STC
1993	Angels in America, Part 1: Millennium Approaches and Part 2: Perestroika	Prior	Wharf Theatre, Sydney, with STC
1993	The Temple	Mick Albert	Wharf Theatre, Sydney with STC
1994	The Gift of the Gorgon	Phillip	Wharf Theatre, Sydney, with STC
1995	Saint Joan	The Dauphin / Charles	Sydney Opera House with STC
1994; 1995	Arcadia	Valentine	Sydney Opera House, Playhouse, Adelaide, Theatre Royal, Hobart, Canberra Theatre with STC
1996	Heretic	Young Derek Freeman	Sydney Opera House, Subiaco Theatre, Perth, Bunbury Regional Entertainment Centre, Goldfields Arts Centre, Kalgoorlie, Playhouse, Melbourne with STC
1996	Stiffs	Lester	Wharf Theatre, Sydney, with STC
1997	Gossamer	Lovett	Ensemble Theatre, Sydney
1997	Cabaret	Emcee	University of Sydney
1998	Moby Dick	Ishmael	Sydney Opera House with STC
1999	Betrayal	Robert	Wharf Theatre, Sydney, with STC
2001	The School for Scandal	Joseph Surface	Sydney Opera House with STC
2001	Welcome to Paradise	Various roles	Greyfriars Kirk House, Edinburgh, Scotland for Edinburgh Festival
2003	The Club	Gerry	Sydney Opera House with STC
2005	Democracy	Arno Kretschman	Sydney Theatre with STC
2005; 2006	End of the Rainbow	Anthony Chapman	Sydney Opera House, Playhouse, Melbourne, Assembly Rooms, Edinburgh, Scotland
2005	Last Minute		BlackBox, Melbourne for Short+Sweet
2010	The Fate of Franklin & His Gallant Crew		The Little Bakery, Melbourne with Four Larks
2010	Total Football		La Mama, Melbourne
2013	The History Boys	Headmaster	Sydney Opera House with Peach Theatre Company
2013	Robots vs Art	Clawbot	La Mama, Melbourne, Bondi Pavilion, Sydney
2019	Photograph 51	Maurice Wilkins	MTC

== Awards ==
Year	Role	Award	Category	Result
1997	Cabaret	Glugs Theatrical Awards	Colleen Clifford Memorial Award Outstanding Performance in a Musical or Special Comedy Satire	Won
