= Radiance (1998 film) =

- Directed by: Rachel Perkins
- Written by: Louis Nowra
- Based on: Radiance by Louis Nowra
- Produced by: Ned Lander; Andrew Meyer
- Starring: Deborah Mailman
- Cinematography: Warwick Thornton
- Edited by: James Bradley
- Music by: Alistair Jones
- Production companies: Eclipse Films; Australian Film Commission; Andyinc Foundation; New South Wales Film and Television Office; SBS Independent; The Premium Movie Partnership for Showtime Australia
- Release date: 8 October 1998
- Running time: 80 minutes
- Country: Australia
- Language: English
- Box office: A$441,168 (Australia)

Radiance is a 1998 Australian independent film. It is the first feature film directed by Rachel Perkins, and only the third feature directed by an Indigenous Australian person. It is about three Indigenous sisters who reunite for their mother's funeral, and is based on the 1993 play written by Louis Nowra.

== Plot ==
Three sisters, Cressy, Nona, and Mae, who have not seen each other for a long time, are brought together after their mother dies, to arrange her funeral. Mae wears her mother's wedding dress, while she and Nona argue about what to do with their mother's ashes. They each try to grab the ashes, which then spill all over Cressy.

== Cast ==
- Rachael Maza as Cressy
- Deborah Mailman as Nona
- Trisha Morton-Thomas as Mae
- Russell Kiefel as Father Doyle

== Production ==
Rachel Perkins became aware of the play when she saw Trisha Morton-Thomas perform Mae's beach monologue as a part of the Eora College end-of-year student showcase. Perkins called Louis Nowra to adapt it into a half-hour drama, but Nowra suggested they make it as a feature film. It was her first feature fiction film as a director, and only the third feature film directed by an Indigenous Australian person, following Jindalee Lady (1992) and BeDevil (1993).

Perkins said later that it took a long time to cast the main characters, who included Deb Mailman, then a newcomer from Brisbane, and that they rehearsed for six weeks before filming began. The actors got to know their characters really well, and added ideas to the script.

Louis Nowra wrote the script, Ned Lander produced the film, and the cinematographer was Warwick Thornton.

Radiance was filmed at Agnes Water, Rosedale, Childers, Bundaberg, and Hervey Bay in Queensland, and in Sydney.

== Awards ==
Australian Film Institute

- Best Performance by an Actress in a Leading Role: Deborah Mailman
- Nominations:
  - Best Achievement in Direction, Best Achievement in Editing, Best Achievement in Production Design, Best Film, Best Screenplay Adapted from Another Source

Australian Screen Sound Guild

- Best Achievement in Sound Design & FX Editing for a Feature Film

Canberra International Film Festival

- Audience Award

Film Critics Circle of Australia Awards

- Best Actor – Female: Deborah Mailman
- Nomination: Best Screenplay – Adapted

Melbourne International Film Festival

- Most Popular Feature Film
