= Mabo (film) =

- DVD cover
- Directed by: Rachel Perkins
- Written by: Sue Smith
- Produced by: Darren Dale; Miranda Dear
- Starring: Jimi Bani; Deborah Mailman; Ewen Leslie; Colin Friels; Miranda Otto; Damien Garvey; Tom Budge; Felix Williamson; Leon Ford; Lasarus Ratuere
- Edited by: Rochelle Oshlack
- Music by: Antony Partos
- Production companies: ABC; Blackfella Films; Screen Queensland; Screen NSW
- Release date: 9 June 2012 (Australia)
- Running time: 103 minutes
- Country: Australia
- Language: English

Mabo is an Australian docudrama TV film, released in 2012, which relates the successful legal battle waged by Torres Strait Islander man Eddie Koiki Mabo to bring about native land title legislation in Australia.

== Synopsis ==
Mabo tells the story of one of Australia's national heroes – Eddie Koiki Mabo, the Torres Strait Islander man who left school at age 15, yet spearheaded the High Court challenge that overthrew the fiction of terra nullius.

== Cast ==
- Jimi Bani as Eddie Mabo
  - Gedor Zaro as Young Eddie
- Deborah Mailman as Bonita Mabo (née Nehow)
- Ewen Leslie as Bryan Keon-Cohen
- Colin Friels as Justice Moynahan
- Miranda Otto as Margaret White
- Tom Budge as Greg McIntyre
- Felix Williamson as Ron Castan
- Leon Ford as Henry Reynolds
- Lasarus Ratuere as Malcolm Mabo
- Damien Garvey as Conroy
- Heath Bergerson as Davy
- Miranda Tapsell as Davy’s wife
- Robyn Moore as Barbara Hocking
- Charles Passi as Benny Mabo
- Rob Carlton as Paddy Kilkoran
- Chris Bartholemew as Townsville Hotel Barman
- Daniel Murphy as Doctor
- Joseph J. U. Taylor as Bob Katter
- Alan David Lee as John Byrne
- Matthew Whittet as Noel Loos
- Jeremy Ambrum as Donita’s relative
- Monette Lee as Justice Mary Gaudron

== Production ==
The film was written by Sue Smith, directed by Rachel Perkins and produced by Darren Dale and Miranda Dear, all of Blackfella Films, with the assistance of the ABC and SBS. It was filmed at Mer Island in the Torres Strait, Townsville, Brisbane and Canberra.

== Release ==
It premiered at the Sydney Film Festival 2012.
