= Victor Ramon =

Brazilian footballer

Personal information
- Full name: Victor Ramon Rosa Neto
- Date of birth: 14 January 2000 (age 26)
- Place of birth: Brazil
- Height: 1.86 m (6 ft 1 in)
- Position: Centre-back

Team information
- Current team: Capivariano

Youth career
- 2018: Juventus SP
- 2019: Guarani SP

Senior career*
Years	Team	Apps	(Gls)
2018	Juventus SP	0	(0)
2019–2021	Guarani SP	4	(1)
2021–2022	Deportes La Serena	15	(0)
2024–	Capivariano	0	(0)
- * Club domestic league appearances and goals as of 29 June 2022

Victor Ramon Rosa Neto (born 14 January 2000), known as Victor Ramon, is a Brazilian professional footballer who plays as a centre-back for Chilean Primera División side Capivariano.

== Career ==
On 10 November 2020, Ramon made his professional debut as a starting player for Guarani in the Série B match against Cruzeiro and last featured in a Série B game on 20 January 2021, playing just seven minutes versus Vitória in a 2–1 defeat.

In September 2021, he moved to Chile and joined Deportes La Serena in the Chilean Primera División.
