= Darren Dale =

Australian film producer

- Born: Australia
- Occupations: Film producer, television producer
- Years active: 2000–present
- Organization: Blackfella Films
- Notable work: Total Control

Darren Dale is an Indigenous Australian film and television producer. He joined film production company Blackfella Films as a producer and later co-director (with founder Rachel Perkins), and as of August 2024 is managing director. Dale is known for co-producing many films and television series with Miranda Dear since 2010, with their most recent collaboration being the second season of Total Control.

== Early life and education ==
Darren Dale is a Bundjalung man from northern New South Wales.

== Career ==
Dale joined Blackfella Films in 2001, and became co-director with company founder Rachel Perkins. The first stand-out success of this collaboration came with the production of First Australians, a 7-part documentary broadcast on SBS Television in 2008, that won many awards and remains the highest-selling educational title in Australia. It was also sold overseas.

Dale has co-produced many films and television series with Miranda Dear, who joined Blackfella in 2010.

In 2011 he produced The Tall Man, a full-length documentary film directed by Tony Krawitz about the death in custody of Cameron Doomadgee on Great Palm Island in Queensland, which won several awards, including the Walkley Documentary Award. Other producing credits include First Contact (which won the 2015 Logie Award for Most Outstanding Factual Program), Filthy Rich & Homeless, DNA Nation, Deep Water: The Real Story and In My Own Words, directed by Erica Glynn.

In 2012 Dale and Dear produced the telemovie Mabo, a docudrama about the fight for land rights by Eddie Mabo, directed by Perkins.

In 2015 he co-created and executive produced the award-winning children's TV series Ready for This.

Dale produced Maralinga Tjarutja, a documentary about the people whose lives were disrupted by the British nuclear tests at Maralinga, created by Larissa Behrendt for ABC Television in 2020.

Total Control, a drama series with the first season premiering at the Toronto International Film Festival in 2019, winner of the AACTA Award for Best TV Drama that year, was directed by Perkins and produced by Dale and Dear.

In 2023 Dale co-produced the documentary series First Weapons for the ABC, with Dena Curtis. Hosted by Phil Breslin, the series looks at the complex scientific principles behind traditional Aboriginal weapons, discussing and testing them with weapon makers and scientific experts.

== Other roles ==
Between 2002 and 2011, Dale and Perkins, as directors of Blackfella, curated and produced the Message Sticks Indigenous Film Festival, which was held at the Sydney Opera House before touring nationally. In 2012, Dale curated and presented Blackfella Films Presents, a selection of Indigenous films, in partnership with the Sydney, Melbourne and Brisbane International Film Festivals.

Dale served on the board of Screen NSW from 2011 to 2015, the Council of the Australian Film Television and Radio School (AFTRS) from 2012 to 2018 (from 2014 deputy chair). He also previously served on the board of ACMI.

In August 2024, Dale was appointed by the Australian Government to the board member of Screen Australia for three years. As of August 2024, he also serves on the boards of the Sydney Film Festival and the National Institute of Dramatic Art, and is deputy chair of the Sydney Festival board. He is also a member of the NSW Government's Creative Communities Council, and of the Academy of Motion Picture Arts and Sciences.

== Recognition and awards ==
Dale has been awarded UNAA Media Peace Awards twice, in 2009 and 2010.

In 2011 Dale and Perkins, as directors of Blackfella Films, were ranked 16th in the Encore Power 50.

In 2012 he was awarded an honorary degree from AFTRS.

In July 2021 Dale, along with actor and filmmaker Wayne Blair and Australian producers Rosemary Blight and Kylie du Fresne, were invited to join the Academy of Motion Picture Arts and Sciences.

In 2024, a painting of Dale by Ben Smith, entitled If you can see it, you can be it, was a finalist for the 2024 Archibald Prize.

Many series and films produced by Dale have been nominated for awards, with wins including:

- 2008: First Australians (2008) won many awards, including AFI, AWGIE, Logie and Australian Directors' Guild Awards.
- 2011: Walkley Documentary Award, for The Tall Man (shared with Chloe Hooper and Tony Krawitz)
- 2011: AWGIE Award for Best Broadcast Documentary, for The Tall Man
- 2014: AACTA Best Television Drama Series, for Redfern Now (with Miranda Dear)
- 2015: AACTA Best Children's Television Series, for Ready for This (with Miranda Dear and Joanna Werner)
- 2015: Logie Award for Most Outstanding Factual Program for First Contact
- 2020: Silver Award for Documentary (Human Rights) at the 2021 New York Festivals TV & Film Awards, for Maralinga Tjarutja
- 2023: Winner (with Rachel Perkins, Jacob Hickey and Don Watson), Digital History Prize, New South Wales Premier's History Awards for The Australian Wars, Episode 1
