= Deborah Mailman =

Australian actress (born 1972)

Deborah Mailman AM
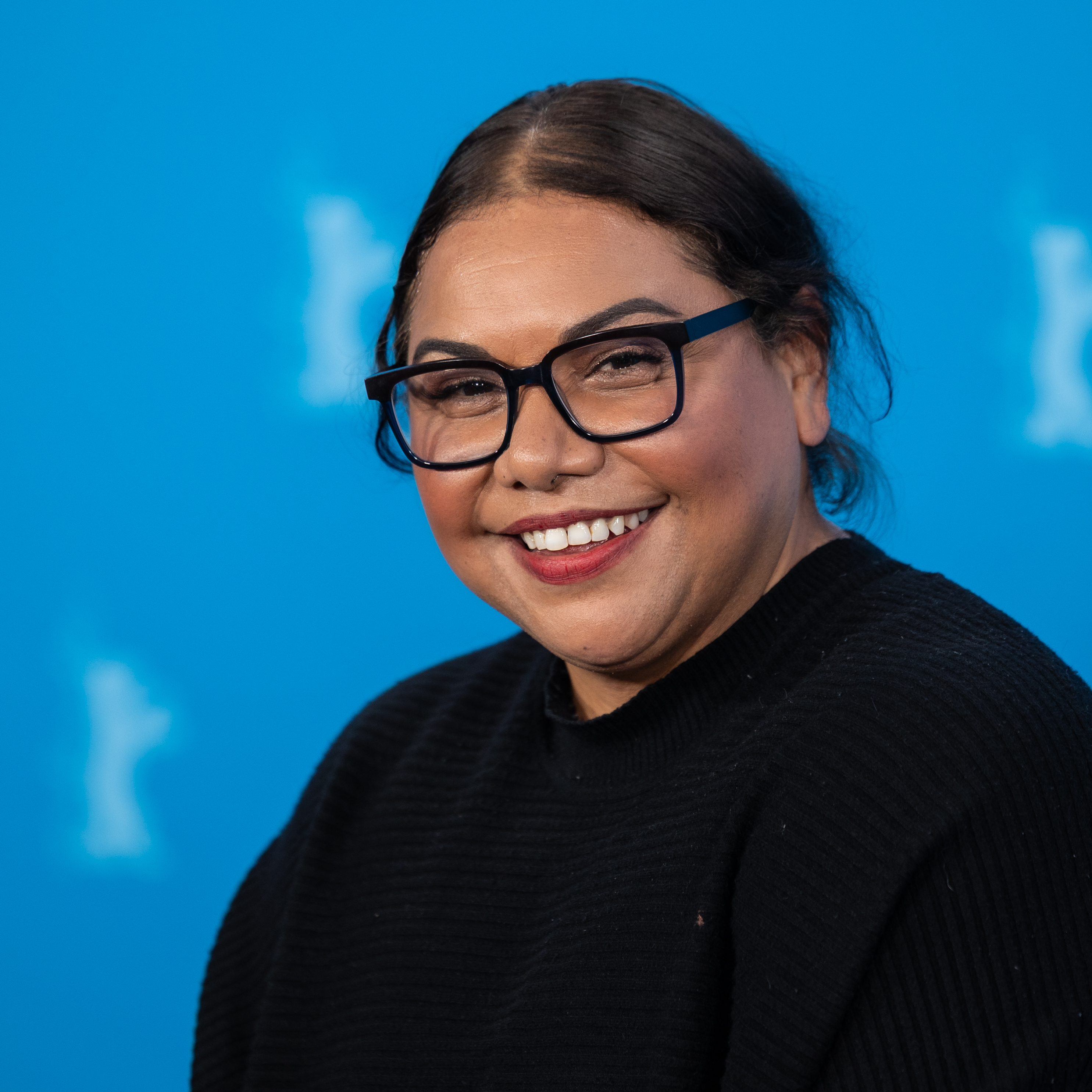
- Mailman in 2026
- Born: Deborah Jane Mailman; 14 July 1972 (age 54); Australia
- Education: Queensland University of Technology
- Occupation: Actress
- Years active: 1994–present
- Partner: Matthew Coonan
- Children: 2

Deborah Mailman AM (born 1972) is an Australian actress. Mailman is best known for her roles in television series such as The Secret Life of Us, Offspring, Redfern Now, Cleverman, and Total Control. She first gained recognition in the 1998 film Radiance, for which she won her first AFI award. Her other well known films are Rabbit-Proof Fence, Bran Nue Dae, Oddball, The Sapphires, Paper Planes, Blinky Bill the Movie, H Is for Happiness, The Book of Revelation, and Wolfram.

Mailman was the first Indigenous Australian actress to win the Australian Film Institute Award for Best Actress in a Leading Role, and has gone on to win seven more (now known as AACTA Awards) both in television and film. She was inducted into the Logie Hall of Fame in 2026.

== Early life and education ==
Deborah Mailman was born in 1972. She is one of four children born to Jane (née Pahau) and Wally Mailman. Her father was an Aboriginal Australian from the Bidjara people of Queensland, while her mother was a Māori woman from the Ngāti Porou iwi. Her parents met in New Zealand where her father was touring as a rodeo rider. Wally died in 2000, and Jane in 2022.

Mailman grew up around Mount Isa in north-west Queensland. She initially did drama in high school to avoid business classes. She developed a passion for performing and later earned prizes at local eisteddfods.

In 1992, she graduated from Queensland University of Technology Academy of the Arts with a Bachelor of Arts, majoring in performing arts.

== Career ==
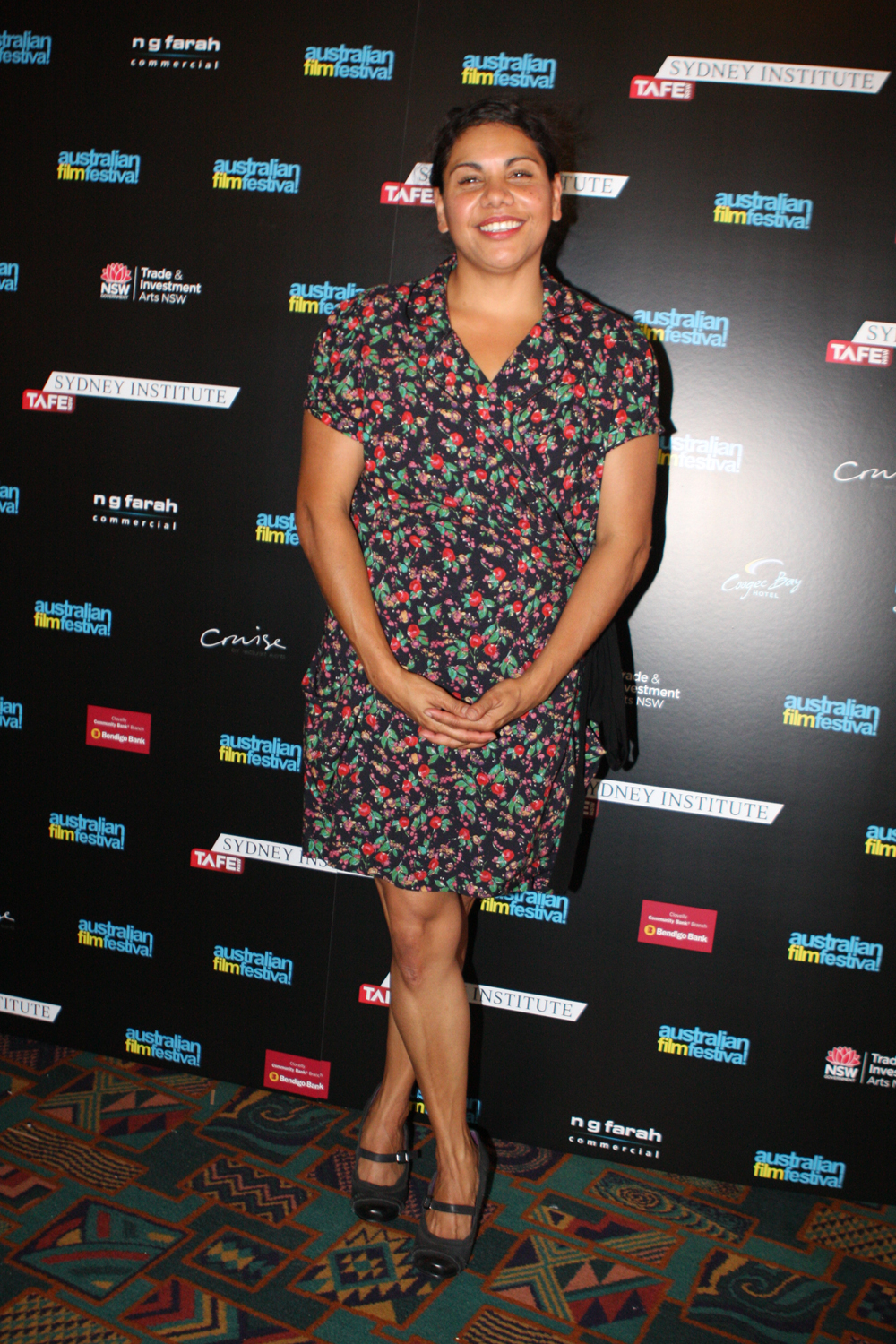
Mailman at Australian Film Walk of Fame at Randwick Ritz, The Spot Festival in 2012

Mailman played the role of Kate in a La Boite Theatre production of Shakespeare's The Taming of the Shrew in 1994. Other early stage roles include solo show The Seven Stages of Grieving (which she co-wrote with Wesley Enoch) for Kooemba Jdarra and Queensland Theatre Company's 1997 revival of Louis Nowra's play Radiance, and Cordelia in King Lear for Bell Shakespeare in 1998.

In 1998, Mailman made her film debut as Nona in the Australian independent film Radiance (based on the play), for which she won the AFI Award for Best Actress in a Leading Role. She had a role in The Secret Life of Us, for which she was twice awarded Most Outstanding Actress in a Drama Series at the Logies (2002 and 2004).

Mailman was part of the Leah Purcell documentary Black Chicks Talking (2001), where she discussed her Aboriginal heritage. In 2006, she took part in a four-part television documentary series with Cathy Freeman called Going Bush, where the pair set off on a journey from Broome to Arnhem Land spending time with Indigenous communities along the way.

She appeared in the Play School TV series and was part of The Actors Company for the Sydney Theatre Company (2006–2007). She was a presenter on the ABC Television show Message Stick.

Mailman appeared in the film Rabbit-Proof Fence. She played a lead role in the 2010 musical film Bran Nue Dae. In the play The Sapphires and the subsequent film of the same name she played the role of singer Gail McCrae.

She was awarded an Inside Film Award for her short film Ralph, which starred Madeleine Madden. From 2010 to 2014, she played the role of Cherie Butterfield in Channel Ten's Offspring drama series.

In 2012, she starred in Redfern Now, an indigenous mini-series for the ABC. Mailman started as Maureen Prescott in Paper Planes, released 15 January 2015. She then appeared as Mayor Lake in Oddball and the voice of Blinky Bill's mother in Blinky Bill the Movie.

In 2019, she starred as politician Alex Irving in the series Total Control, produced by Blackfella Films and screened on the ABC.

In 2024, Mailman guest starred in the Bluey episode "The Sign", voicing one of the two Sheepdogs looking for a house with a swimming pool. In August 2024, Mailman won the Logie for Best Lead Actress in a Drama at the 2024 Logie Awards for her role in Total Control. Mailman was part of the main cast for Last Days of the Space Age, a Disney+ series released in October 2024.

Mailman starred in Warwick Thornton's 2025 film Wolfram, in which she plays a mother longing for the return of her stolen children. The film premiered at the Adelaide Film Festival on 26 October 2025.

== Other activities ==
In 2013, Mailman was the master of ceremonies for the Sydney Opera House's 40th anniversary concert. On 29 January 2015, Mailman co-hosted the AACTA Awards with Cate Blanchett.

From 2015 to 2025, Mailman was a member of the Sydney Opera House Trust. In 2019, Mailman was appointed to a three-year term as a member of the Screen Australia board. In September 2024, Mailman was appointed as a member of First Nations Arts, a newly-established division of the government arts funding body Australia Council focused on Aboriginal and Torres Strait Islander arts, for a term of four years.

== Personal life ==
Mailman married Matthew Coonan, and they have two sons. As of April 2026, they live on the South Coast of New South Wales.

== Filmography ==
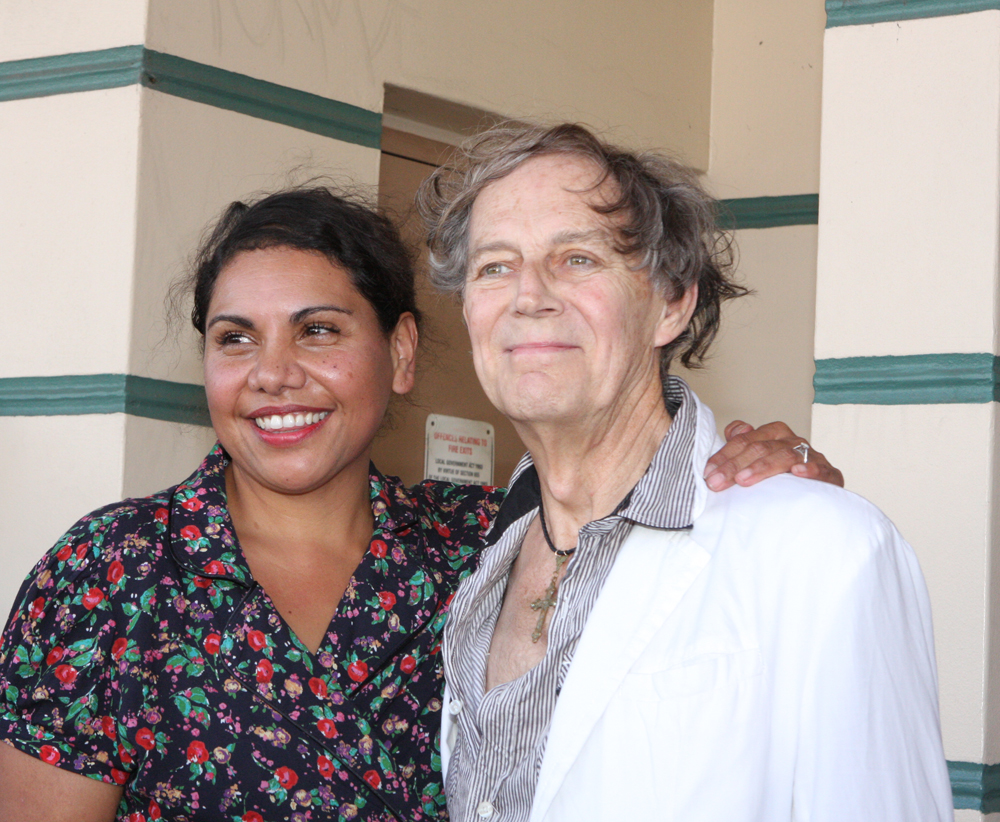
Mailman and actor Barry Otto in 2012

=== Films ===
Year	Film	Role	Notes
1998	Radiance	Nona	
2000	The Third Note	Tina	Short film
2000	The Monkey's Mask	Lou	
2002	Rabbit-Proof Fence	Mavis	
2006	The Book of Revelation	Julie	
2009	Bran Nue Dae	Roxanne	
2012	Mental	Sandra	
2012	The Sapphires	Gail McCrae	
2012	Mabo	Bonita	
2013	The Darkside	Pamela	
2014	Paper Planes	Maureen	
2015	Oddball	Mayor Lake	Also narrator
2015	Redfern Now: Promise Me	Lorraine	TV movie
2015	Blinky Bill the Movie	Blinky's mum	Voice; Animated film
2016	A Few Less Men	Police Officer	
2017	Three Summers	Pam	
2017	Djali	Gracie Phillips	Short film
2019	H Is for Happiness	Penelope Benson	
2020	2067	Regina	
2020	Combat Wombat	Maggie Diggins	Voice; Animated film
2023	Combat Wombat: Back 2 Back	Maggie Diggins	Voice; Animated film
2023	Scarygirl	Treedweller	Voice; Animated film
2023	The New Boy	Sister Mum	
2024	Runt	Bernadette Box	
2025	Kangaroo	Rosie	
2025	Wolfram	Pansy	

=== Television ===
Year	Television	Role	Notes	Ref.
1998–2002	Play School	Herself	Presenter	
2001–05	The Secret Life of Us	Kelly Lewis / Narrator	Main cast (86 episodes)	
2005	The Alice	Sonia	Episodes 1 & 2	
2006	Two Twisted	Jones	TV series	
2006	The Chaser's War on Everything	Herself	Episode 9	
2010–17	Offspring	Cherie Butterfield	Main cast (69 episodes)	
2012	Redfern Now	Lorraine	Episode 3: "Raymond"; Episode 7: "Where the Heart Is"	
2014–16	Black Comedy	Guest Cast	9 episodes	
2014–21	Jack Irish	Cynthia	Dead Point movie and 7 episodes	
2016	Tomorrow When the War Began	Kath Mackenzie	6 episodes	
2016–17	Cleverman	Aunty Linda	12 episodes	
2016	Wolf Creek	Bernadette O'Dell	Episode 1.3: "Salt Lake"; Episode 1.4: "Opalville"	
2016	Please Like Me	Siobhan	Episode 4.6: "Souvlaki"	
2017–23	Little J & Big Cuz	Big Cuz	Animated series	
2017	Get Krack!n	Prime Minister Burney	Episode 1.7	
2018	Mystery Road	Kerry Thompson	Mini-series	
2018	Bite Club	Anna Morton	8 episodes	
2019–24	Total Control	Alex Irving	Main cast	
2023	Ark: The Animated Series	Deborah Walker	Voice role	
2024	Boy Swallows Universe	Poppy Birkbeck	3 episodes	
2024	Bluey	Sheepdog 1	Voice role, Episode: "The Sign"	
2024	Last Days of the Space Age	Elieen Wilberforce	8 episodes	
2026	Dear Life	Susan Sinclair	4 episodes	

== Awards and nominations ==
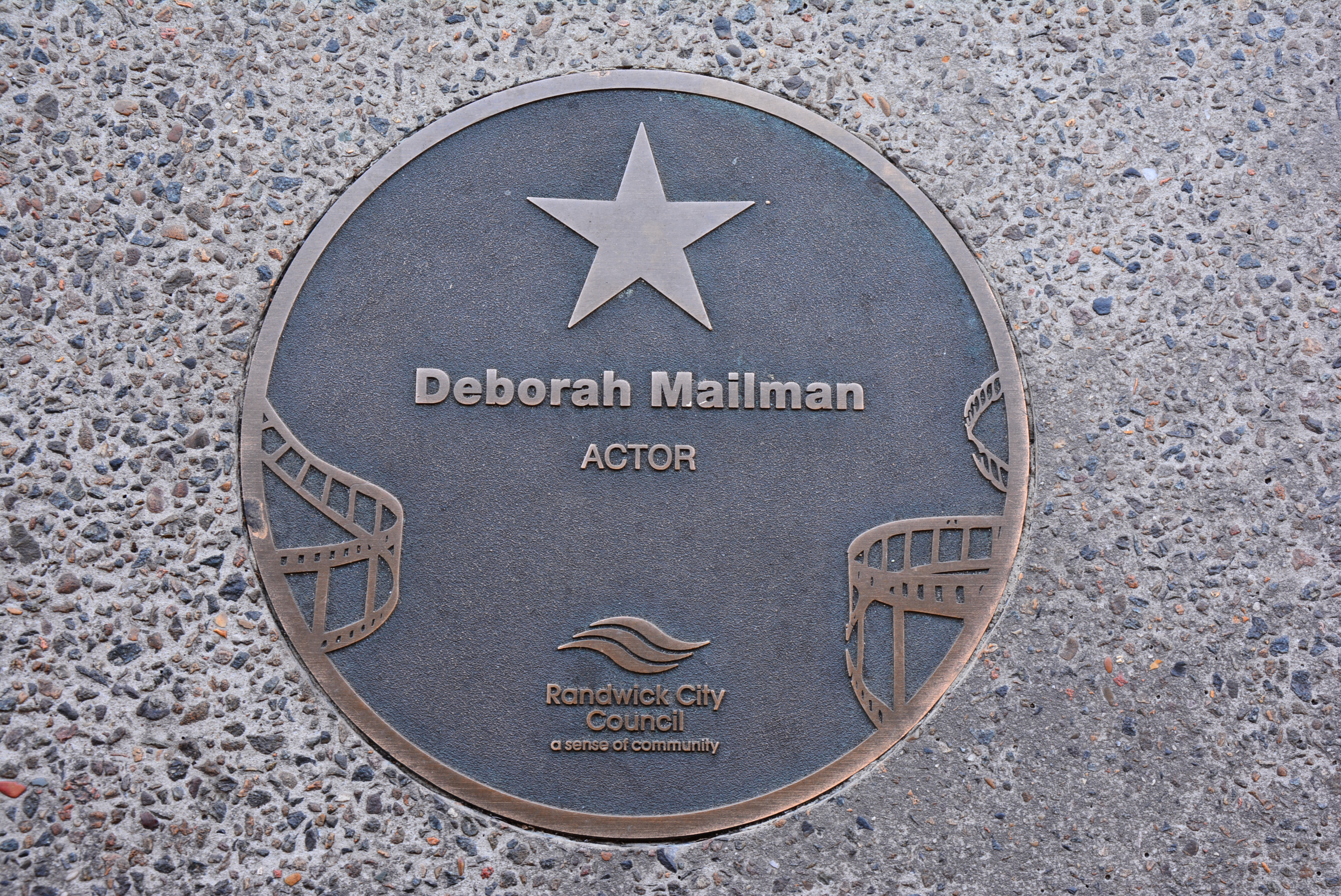
Mailman's plaque at the Australian Film Walk of Fame, Ritz Cinema, Randwick, Sydney

=== AACTA Awards ===
Year	Category	Film	Result
1998	Best Leading Movie Actress	Radiance	Won
2003	Best Leading TV Actress	The Secret Life of Us	Won
2010	Best Supporting Movie Actress	Bran Nue Dae	Won
2010	Best Supporting TV Actress	Offspring	Won
2013	Best Leading Movie Actress	The Sapphires	Won
2013	Best Supporting Movie Actress	Mental	Nominated
2015	Best Supporting Movie Actress	Paper Planes	Nominated
2015	Best Leading TV Actress	Redfern Now: Promise Me	Nominated
2019	Best Lead Actress in a TV Drama	Total Control	Won
2020	Best Actress in a Supporting Role	H Is for Happiness	Nominated
2024	Best Actress in a Supporting Role	The New Boy	Won
2026	Best Actress in a Supporting Role	Kangaroo	Won

=== Equity Ensemble Awards ===
Year	Category	Film	Result
2010	Most Outstanding Performance by an Ensemble in a Drama Series	Offspring	Nominated
2011	Most Outstanding Performance by an Ensemble in a Drama Series	Offspring	Nominated
2012	Most Outstanding Performance by an Ensemble in a Drama Series	Redfern Now	Won
2012	Most Outstanding Performance by an Ensemble in a Drama Series	Offspring	Nominated
2012	Most Outstanding Performance by an Ensemble in a Television Movie or Miniseries	Mabo	Nominated

=== FCCA Awards ===
Year	Category	Film	Result
2010	Best Supporting Actress	Bran Nue Dae	Nominated
2013	Best Actress	The Sapphires	Nominated

=== Helpmann Awards ===
Year	Category	Production	Result
2003	Best Female Actor in a Play	The Seven Stages of Grieving	Nominated
2005	Best Female Actor in a Play	The Sapphires	Nominated
2007	Best Female Actor in a Supporting Role in a Play	The Lost Echo	Won

=== Logie Awards ===
Year	Category	Television	Result	Ref.
2002	Most Outstanding Actress	The Secret Life of Us	Won	
2003	Most Outstanding Actress	The Secret Life of Us	Nominated	
2004	Most Outstanding Actress	The Secret Life of Us	Won	
2013	Most Outstanding Actress	Mabo	Won	
2013	Most Popular Actress	Mabo	Nominated	
2016	Most Outstanding Actress	Redfern Now: Promise Me	Won	
2017	Most Outstanding Supporting Actress	Wolf Creek	Nominated	
2017	Most Popular Actress	Cleverman / Jack Irish / Offspring / Wolf Creek	Nominated	
2018	Most Popular Actress	Cleverman	Nominated	
2019	Most Popular Actress	Bite Club / Mystery Road	Won	
2024	Best Lead Actress in a Drama	Total Control	Won	

== Honours ==
In 2003, Mailman was NAIDOC Person of the Year, and also won Female Actor of the Year.

In 2012, Mailman was a recipient of the Queensland Greats Awards.

In 2017, Mailman won the Chauvel Award, which acknowledges significant contribution to the Australian screen industry.

On 12 June 2017, Mailman was made a Member of the Order of Australia for 'significant service to the performing arts as an actor, as a role model for Indigenous performers, and to the community.'

In August 2026, Mailman was inducted into the Logie Hall of Fame, recognising her significant contribution as an actor to Australia’s film and television industry. She is the first Indigenous person to be inducted into the Logie Hall of Fame.
