= Screen Australia =

Film studio owned by the Australian Government

- Type: Government-owned
- Predecessors: Australian Film Commission; Film Finance Corporation Australia; Film Australia
- Founded: 1 July 2008; 18 years ago
- Headquarters: Sydney, New South Wales, Australia
- Number of employees: 95
- Website: screenaustralia.gov.au

Screen Australia is the Australian Federal Government's key funding body for the Australian screen production industry, created under the Screen Australia Act 2008. From 1 July 2008, Screen Australia took over the functions of its predecessor agencies the Australian Film Commission (AFC), the Film Finance Corporation Australia and Film Australia Limited.

Screen Australia supports the development, production, promotion and distribution of Australian narrative and documentary screen content.

== History ==
The Commonwealth Screen Australia Act 2008 provides detailed information about the specific functions and powers of Screen Australia. Under this act, from 1 July 2008 the Australian Film Commission, the Film Finance Corporation Australia and Film Australia Limited were merged into one body, to be known as Screen Australia. New Zealand television and film executive Ruth Harley was appointed the inaugural chief executive officer, handing over to Graeme Mason at the end of her five-year term in 2013.

== Management and functions ==
Screen Australia functions to support and promote the development of screen culture in Australia, with a primary focus on creating innovative and commercially sustainable screen production. Screen Australia also operates to support the production, promotion and distribution of Australian screen content, as well as ensuring access to these programs. Screen Australia provides support to content creators through providing financial assistance, guarantees, services, facilities, programs and equipment, as well as sponsoring other activities, and supports the development of a diverse range of Australian programs, with an emphasis on documentaries, children's programs and cultural programs. It also promotes programs that incorporate matters of national interest or importance to Australians, or programs with relevance to Australian people and their lives. Across its various departments, Screen Australia supports the development, production, promotion and distribution of Australian narrative and documentary screen content.

As of 2025, the CEO is Deirdre Brennan, while Grainne Brunsdon is the Chief Operating Officer. The chairman of the Screen Australia Board is Michael Ebeid, while board members include Deborah Mailman.

The agency not only provides funding to individuals and companies within the industry, but also administers the tax rebate for the production of Australian screen content, known as the Producer Offset. The other rebates which complete the "Australian Screen Production Incentive" suite are maintained by the Department of Infrastructure, Transport, Regional Development, Communications, Sport and the Arts.

=== Indigenous Department ===
In 1993, the Australian Film Commission established the Indigenous Branch, whose work was continued through Screen Australia's Indigenous Department. This branch was created following the recommendations of Shirley McPherson and Michael Pope's report, Promoting Indigenous Involvement in the Film and Television Industry, with the primary objective of increasing the rate of engagement of Aboriginal and Torres Strait Islander people within the screen industry. After the establishment of Screen Australia in 2008, it took over the department.

From 2004 the AFC and from 2008 Screen Australia's Indigenous units helped to fund the Message Sticks Festival.

In her role as head of the Indigenous Department (continuing from head of the AFC's Indigenous Branch), Sally Riley was responsible for the production of the award-winning feature film Samson and Delilah in 2009, directed by Warwick Thornton. She also helped to launch the career of other Indigenous film professionals, such as Wayne Blair, Beck Cole and Darlene Johnson, and under her leadership, development support was provided for the acclaimed series First Australians (2008), by Rachel Perkins and Darren Dale. Riley left in 2010, after being appointed as the inaugural head of the Indigenous department at ABC Television, and was succeeded by Penny Smallacombe.

Statistics showed a significant shift in the engagement of Indigenous and Torres Strait Islanders within the film industry over 25 years of the existence of the Indigenous Department. A 2002 study found that no Indigenous actors had a notable role on Australian television in 1992, and this number had only risen to two by 1999. A Screen Australia study in 2016 found that 5 percent of main characters on Australian television between 2011 and 2015 were Indigenous.

As of June 2018 the Indigenous Department had provided A$35 million in funding to over 160 projects, with its annual budget then A$3.3 million.

In August 2018, the department celebrated 25 years of its existence, which filmmakers, actors and others associated with the industry, including Rachel Perkins, Ivan Sen, Leah Purcell, and Warwick Thornton, celebrated at the Carriageworks in Redfern.

To be eligible for assistance from Screen Australia's Indigenous Department, the applicant must be an Aboriginal or Torres Strait Islander Australian and must develop a project in which an Aboriginal or Torres Strait Islander Australian has a key creative role, such as a writer or director.

== Funding programs ==
As of 2020 (having introduced a new system in 2018), Screen Australia runs several funding programs for Australian filmmakers:

- The Generate program, providing funding for story development, is awarded to "new, emerging or experienced screen content creators who demonstrate an ability and passion for storytelling combined with a distinctive and authentic creative voice".
- Also for story development, the Premium funding award is for "screen content creators who have a significant track record/production credits on projects that have commercial success and/or critical acclaim".
- The International Finance program provides funding for projects that are already market-ready and have secured some funding from a commercial source; this is aimed at films which have potential for international box office appeal.

There are also separate programs for funding feature films relating to Indigenous Australians, documentary films, and for pitching films to international markets.

=== Application process ===
The application process to receive funding from Screen Australia was previously complicated and required creators to have previous screen credits in order to be eligible. The introduction of the Generate and Premium funds, however, has allowed for virtually no eligibility barriers, encouraging new entrants to complete the application process. An application to receive funding from Screen Australia requires a one-page synopsis as well as a three-minute pitch to camera, describing the story, intended audience and how the film will reach them.

=== Expenditure ===
Screen Australia's annual drama expenditure for 2021/22 was $2.29B, made up of a record spend on Australian titles of $1.51 billion, plus $777 million spent on foreign productions.

Screen Australia supplied nearly A$76 million in direct funding to the screen sector in the 2018/19 financial year.

In the 2019/20 financial year, A$41 million was approved for producing narrative films, including television drama, feature films, children's television and online productions.

In 2020, the funding model and the practices of the organisation had to change significantly owing to the impact of the COVID-19 pandemic in Australia and worldwide on the film industry. Screen Australia first gave more than A$1 million in emergency funding for productions that had already had funding, but were forced to close down or pause production. Additional funding was provided for projects that could work remotely, and a new Premium Plus development fund was launched. COVID-safe guidelines were developed for the industry in a joint initiative by the Australian Screen Sector Task Force; Screen Australia allocated A$10 million to a new COVID-19 Budget Support Fund, and were appointed to administer the A$50 million Temporary Interruption Fund (TIF), which was initiated by the government that June. More fundings were provided for several feature films, television series and online projects during 2020, including those from the Premium and Generate funding schemes.

Several legislative changes were brought that affect the structure of the Qualifying Australian Production Expenditure (QAPE).

== See also ==
- Cinema of Australia
- VicScreen
- Screen NSW
- Screen Territory
- Screen Queensland
- Screenwest
- South Australian Film Corporation
- List of film production companies
- List of television production companies
