= First Australians =

Australian TV documentary series

- First Australians Intro title
- Genre: Historical documentary
- Created by: Rachel Perkins
- Directed by: Rachel Perkins, Beck Cole
- Country of origin: Australia
- No. of episodes: 7

Production
- Producers: Darren Dale, Rachel Perkins
- Cinematography: Warwick Thornton, Kim Batterham
- Running time: 60 minutes
- Production company: Blackfella Films

Original release
- Network: SBS
- Release: 12 October – 2 November 2008

First Australians is a seven-part Australian historical documentary TV series produced by Blackfella Films over the course of six years, and first aired on SBS TV in October 2008. It discusses the history of Aboriginal peoples during and after the European colonisation of Australia. A book was published to accompany the series.

== Synopsis ==
The series chronicles the history of contemporary Australia, from the perspective of its first people, Aboriginal Australians and Torres Strait Islander people. The series is essentially a synthesis of well-documented historical information. It relies heavily on archival documents and interpretations from historians and members of both the Aboriginal and European community and leaders. It tries to tell the story of Australian history from a contemporary Indigenous point of view.

The story begins in 1788 in Sydney, with the arrival of the First Fleet and ends in 1993 with Koiki Mabo's legal challenge to the foundation of Australia.

The series comprises seven episodes in which it explores what unfolded when the oldest living culture in the world was confronted by the British Empire. It explores the lives of particular individuals and uses their stories as a vehicle to explain the larger situations of the time. It explains violent aspects of European settlement of Australia, such as killings, battles, wars, as well as acts of friendship and decency between the early European settlers and Aboriginal Australians. Aboriginal Australian history has until recently been clouded by the "great Australian silence", referring to ignorance of the real history of Australia seen as a way for non-Aboriginal Australians to hide shame for their own history.

The series was the winner of multiple awards, remains the highest-selling educational title in Australia as of 2021, and was also sold overseas.

== Episodes ==
A total of seven episodes were filmed. The series was first transmitted in Australia from 12 October to 2 November 2008.

#	Title		Air date	Synopsis
1	They Have Come to Stay	New South Wales (1788–1824)	12 October 2008	The arrival of the First Fleet in Botany Bay in 1788. Curious of each other, friendships form, but relations between the two races soon sour as settlers spread out across the land. Focuses on the relationship between Bennelong and Governor Arthur Phillip, as well as the lives of Pemulwuy, William Dawes and Patyegarang, and Windradyne.
2	Her Will to Survive	Tasmania (1803–1880)	14 October 2008	The land grab moves south to Tasmania, culminating in the violent conflict. In an effort to protect real estate prices, Tasmanian Aboriginal people are removed from the island. The government enlists an young immigrant, George Augustus Robinson, for the job, who is helped by a young Aboriginal woman Truganini.
3	Freedom For Our Lifetime	Victoria (1860–1890)	19 October 2008	The threat of extinction hovers over the first Australians of Victoria after the city of Melbourne is founded. Follows the establishment of mission stations in Victoria such as Coranderrk. Explores the lives of Wurundjeri clan leaders Simon Wonga and William Barak.
4	There Is No Other Law	Central Australia (1878–1897)	21 October 2008	Explores the history of white settlement in Central Australia and the stories of homicidal police officer Constable Willshire, as he brings mayhem to the Arrernte nation. Authorities turn a blind eye before the telegraph operator Frank Gillen stops him.
5	Unhealthy Government Experiment	Western Australia (1897–1937)	26 October 2008	European settlement spreads to Western Australia and is met with much conflict as explored through the stories of Jandamarra. The Stolen Generations is explored through the stories of Chief Protector of Aborigines A. O. Neville and many children including Gladys Gilligan and many others.
6	A Fair Deal for a Dark Race	South-east Australia (1937–1967)	28 October 2008	Chronicles the beginnings of the Aboriginal rights movement, as explored through Yorta Yorta man, William Cooper and his foundation of the Australian Aborigines League in 1933. Also explores the Maralinga nuclear bomb tests in the 1950s and the life of AFL footballer Douglas Nicholls.
7	We Are No Longer Shadows	Queensland & Torres Strait Islands (1967–1992)	2 November 2008	Explores the story of Eddie Koiki Mabo and Aboriginal land rights in the late 20th century, and the high court overturn of the legal fiction of terra nullius which characterised Australian law with regards to land and title.

== Production ==
The general manager of SBS, Nigel Milan, had asked Indigenous historian and academic Gordon Briscoe what he could do for Indigenous people, and Briscoe suggested giving them back their history. It was a very ambitious project, and Rachel Perkins (creator, director, and producer, and daughter of Aboriginal activist Charles Perkins,) said that it was the most important thing she would ever work on, "because it really was an opportunity to try and tell the Indigenous story in a comprehensive manner from an Indigenous perspective, over a span of 200 years. It had never been done before".

When SBS first came to ask me if I were interested in doing a major documentary series on Indigenous history I enthusiastically agreed although I had no idea what it would be. I approached my business partner Darren Dale, and he also readily agreed. All we knew is that it would be bigger than anything we had done before. In making First Australians, it has been common for many to ask why hasn't this story been told? The truth is these stories have been told, at least in print, by the historians we feature in our series. There is more being written all the time and there is a substantial body of work to be found in good libraries if you have the interest. Although First Australians cannot hope to be as comprehensive as the work of these historians, it will provide the public (in the comfort of their own homes), a taste of the story that remains to be understood. Hopefully it will spark national interest in the people on whose lands we have made our homes.

— Rachel Perkins, Director/Writer/Producer, 2008

There were seven episodes, each 60 minutes long, in the series. Episode writing and directing credits included Beck Cole and Louis Nowra. The series was produced by Perkins and Darren Dale of Blackfella Films. The series received funding from the Australian Film Commission and the Film Finance Corporation.

The series featured writer Bruce Pascoe and historians Marcia Langton, Janet McCalman, and Gordon Briscoe.

A significant part of the production of the series involved consultation with the descendants of the individuals portrayed in the documentary. This involved checking the content of scripts, usually face to face, seeking permission to film in particular locations, showing the rough cut of the film for comment and showing the film at fine cut. The series was made in accordance with Indigenous Cultural and Intellectual Property rights, to ensure the cultural content and the rights of Indigenous people. Permission was gained from 200–300 people to publish the stories, photographs, and other material used in the series.

== Broadcast ==
The series was first broadcast on SBS Television in October to November 2008.

== Reception ==
The Sydney Morning Herald described the series as "the documentary of the decade".

== Awards and nominations ==
- 2009: AFI Award: Best Documentary Series for Darren Dale, Rachel Perkins, Helen Panckhurst – Won
- 2009: Logie Award: Outstanding Documentary or Documentary Series – Won
- 2009: New South Wales Premier's Literary Awards Script Writing Award for Louis Nowra, Rachel Perkins & Beck Cole – Won
- 2009: Australian Directors' Guild Awards: Outstanding Direction for a Television Documentary – Series – (Freedom for Our Lifetime) for Rachel Perkins – Won
- 2009: Australian Writers' Guild Award: Outstanding Writing in a Documentary (Episode 1) for Louis Nowra, Rachel Perkins – Won
- 2009: Australian Writers' Guild Award: Outstanding Writing in a Documentary (Episode 3) for Louis Nowra, Beck Cole – Nominated
- 2009: Deadly Awards: Outstanding Achievement in Film – Rachel Perkins – Nominated

== Book ==
A book entitled First Australians: An Illustrated History was published by Miegunyah Press in 2008 to accompany the series, edited by Rachel Perkins and Marcia Langton.

== See also ==
- Australian frontier wars
- Australian history wars
- Genocide of Indigenous Australians
