= Blackfella Films =

Australian film production company

- Type: Documentary and narrative production company
- Industry: Film and Television
- Founded: 1992
- Founder: Rachel Perkins
- Headquarters: Paddington, New South Wales, Sydney, Australia
- Key people: Darren Dale (managing director)
- Website: blackfellafilms.com.au

Blackfella Films is an Australian documentary and narrative film production company headquartered in Sydney, founded in 1992 by Rachel Perkins. The company produces Australian short and feature-length content for film and television with a particular focus on Indigenous Australian stories. Its productions have included the documentary series First Australians and The Australian Wars, the documentary film The Tall Man, the television film Mabo, and the drama series Redfern Now and Total Control.

As of August 2024, producer Darren Dale, who joined the company in 2001, is managing director of Blackfella Films.

== History ==
Blackfella Films was founded in 1992 by Arrernte writer, producer, and director Rachel Perkins. Producer Darren Dale joined the company in 2001, while former head of drama at the ABC, Miranda Dear, joined in 2010 with a focus on producing the company's dramatic content.

From 2002 to 2011 Blackfella Films curated the Message Sticks Indigenous Film Festival, showcasing Indigenous cinema from around the world. The festival was held at the Sydney Opera House before touring the country.

In 2013 producer Jacob Hickey was appointed Head of Factual.

In 2020, Miranda Dear left the company, and in 2022, Rachel Perkins moved on to other things.

In 2020 Erin Bretherton joined the company as Head of Scripted Development and producer. After her departure in 2023, in 2024 Penny Smallacombe was appointed Head of Scripted.

As of August 2024 Darren Dale is managing director.

== Location and description ==
Blackfella Films is a film production company owned by First Nations Australian filmmakers. It creates both factual and drama content in various formats, for cinema release as well as both feature and series forms on television and online platforms. It is headquartered in Sydney and also has an office in Melbourne, where factual content is produced.

== Productions ==
The company's most successful production has been the multi-award-winning seven-part 2008 documentary series First Australians. This series experienced both national and international success, including screening to over 2.3 million viewers in Australia on SBS, and has since become the best selling educational DVD in Australia.

The 2011 documentary, The Tall Man, won the inaugural Walkley Award for "Long-form Journalism: Documentary". In 2012 they released the docudrama Mabo, a telemovie, and produced the six-part television drama series Redfern Now. In late 2012 a second series of Redfern Now was awarded funding from Screen Australia, and went into production in May 2013.

In October 2021 the series Addicted Australia, by Jacob Hickey and Darren Dale of Blackfella Films and SBS Television, was one of three documentaries shortlisted for the Walkley Documentary Award.

The 2022 TV documentary series The Australian Wars won several awards, including Best Documentary/Factual Series at the 3rd Australian International Documentary Conference Awards in March 2023, and the Silver Logie for Most Outstanding Factual or Documentary Program.

== Recognition and awards ==
Many of the films and TV series made by Blackfella Films have won acclaim and awards.

In June 2019, the company won the Sydney UNESCO City of Film Award, worth A$10,000. The prize is given each year by Create NSW, under the auspices of Sydney UNESCO City of Film, and was awarded at the 66th Sydney Film Festival. It was presented by Deborah Mailman to Dale, Perkins, and Dear.

== Selected filmography ==
- From Sand to Celluloid – Payback (1996) (short film)
- Flat (2002) (short film)
- Mimi (2002) (short film)
- First Australians (2008) (documentary series)
- The Party Shoes (2009) (short film)
- Jacob (2009) (short film)
- Lani's Story (2010) (documentary)
- The Tall Man (2011) (documentary)
- Mabo (2012) (TV docudrama film)
- Redfern Now (2012–2013) (TV series)
- First Contact (2014) (documentary series)
- DNA Nation (2016) (3-part documentary series)
- Total Control (2019, 2023) (TV series)
- The Australian Wars (2022) (3-part documentary series)
- Meet the Neighbours, a TV series aired on SBS Television, based on a social experiment in which immigrant families are temporarily relocated from Melbourne to the small country town of Maryborough, Victoria, presented by Myf Warhurst
