= Miranda Dear =

Australian film producer

Miranda Dear is an Australian film producer, who worked with Darren Dale at Blackfella Films for ten years. She is especially known for many acclaimed TV series, including Redfern Now and Total Control.

== Early life ==
Miranda Dear was born in London, England.

== Career ==
Miranda Dear started her film career in the UK at public broadcaster Channel 4, initially in music and arts, then becoming a senior film buyer in the acquisitions unit. She then became production and acquisition consultant for Film Four in Australia around 1996. Film Four had partnered with Showtime Australia in its first foreign co-financing venture, and during this time the collaboration produced John Polson's Siam Sunset and Mark Lamprell's My Mother Frank.

Dear left Film Four in July 2000, to became commissioning editor of drama at SBS independent (the production arm of public broadcaster SBS) in Sydney, Australia, after which Film Four closed its Australian office. During her time at SBSi, it became an important brand, notable for series such as The Circuit and RAN. She commissioned feature drama films such as Look Both Ways, Ten Canoes, and The Tracker, as well as Indigenous drama by Warwick Thornton, Beck Cole, and Wayne Blair.

In 2005, Dear joined ABC Television as executive producer of drama. She was appointed acting head of drama after Scott Meek left, and appointed to the role of ABC head of drama in March 2007. In this role she executive produced many successful drama and comedy series, including Rake and The Librarians. She also commissioned feature films, including Samson & Delilah and Bran Nue Dae, and series such as The Slap and The Straits, among others.

In 2010, she joined Blackfella Films as a producer and head of drama, where she stayed until 2020. There she co-produced many films and series with Darren Dale. In 2019 she was co-creator, with Rachel Griffiths and Darren Dale, of Total Control, and co-produced series 1.

== Other activities ==
Dear was one of three judges at the 2006 My Queer Career short film festival.

In 2017, she was on the jury at the Adelaide Film Festival.

== Notable and awarded works ==
- Mabo (2012)
- Redfern Now s1 (2012): 2013 Silver Logie Award for Most Outstanding Drama
- Redfern Now s2 (2013): 2014 Silver Logie Award for Most Outstanding Drama and 2014 AACTA Award for Most Outstanding Television Drama
