= Wyrmwood – Chronicles of the Dead =

- 2017 Poster
- Wyrmwood TV Teaser
- Directed by: Kiah Roache-Turner
- Screenplay by: Kiah Roache-Turner; Tristan Roache-Turner
- Produced by: Tristan Roache-Turner
- Starring: Nandalie Campbell Killick; Jay Gallagher; Bianca Bradey
- Cinematography: Tim Nagle
- Music by: Michael Lira
- Production company: Guerrilla Films
- Release date: 16 May 2017
- Running time: 9 minutes
- Country: Australia
- Language: English

Wyrmwood – Chronicles of the Dead (also known as Wyrmwood TV Teaser) is an Australian zombie horror TV short directed by Kiah Roache-Turner, produced by Tristan Roache-Turner, and co-written by Kiah and Tristan. The short is based on the Wyrmwood film series and stars Bianca Bradey and Jay Gallagher in returning roles from the original film.

== Cast ==
- Bianca Bradey as Brooke
- Jay Gallagher as Barry
- Nandalie Campbell Killick as Captive
- Jesse Rowles as Doctor

== Production ==
Bianca Bradey announced she would be returning in her role as Brooke in a Wyrmwood TV Pilot back in 2015. Producer Tristan Roache-Turner, confirmed that the Pilot was set 6–12 months after the film and expressed both he and his brothers desire to see the short picked up and converted into a fully fledged television series.

The TV Short was released on the 16 May 2017, and received favourable reviews, with Bloody Disgusting stating “Seriously. This shit is CRAZY and INSANELY GORY. Enjoy”. The Pilot also picked up an award for “Best Short Movie” at the Grossmann Fantastic Film and Wine Festival.

== Cancelled TV series and eventful sequel ==
Despite favourable reviews and an award win at a major film festival, the TV short was never converted into a full-fledged television series like the brothers had hoped for. Despite this, the two would return to the Wyrmwood universe again in 2021 with Wyrmwood: Apocalypse, a direct sequel to the original 2014 film.
