= Kiah Roache-Turner =

Australian film director and screenwriter

- Born: Sydney, Australia
- Occupations: Film Director & Screenwriter
- Years active: 2008-Present
- Known for: Beasts of War (2025), Wyrmwood: Road of the Dead (2014), Sting (2024)
- Relatives: Tristan Roache-Turner

Kiah Roache-Turner is an independent Australian film director and screenwriter, from Sydney Australia. He co-created the Wyrmwood film series alongside his brother Tristan Roache-Turner.

== Career ==
Turner started filmmaking when he was 13, with him and his brother shooting music videos and short films throughout the early 20’s, including “Roadrunner” (2008) and “War Games” (2009). In 2014, the brothers released the zombie horror Wyrmwood. The film garnered international praise, with The West Australian referring to it as “Dawn of the Dead meets Mad Max”, and Rotten Tomatoes critics giving the film a 82%. The zombie film had two sequels, with Kiah returning as writer/director on them both. The first was Wyrmwood – Chronicles of the Dead in 2017, a TV Pilot for a television series that was never picked up. In 2021, Kiah released the stand alone sequel film Wyrmwood: Apocalypse, alongside his brother Tristan.

In 2018, the brothers released the demon hunting feature, Nekrotronic.

It was announced in 2023, that Kiah would be directing the spider horror Sting, starring Ayla Browne. The director told Screen Anarchy in an interview that the idea for the film had come from his real life arachnophobia. That same year, Deadline announced that Kiah was directing a WWII shark based horror film Beast of War. Kiah claimed the film was a tribute to Steven Spielberg's Jaws.

In 2026, it was announced that Kiah had begun production of yet another WWII based film, titled ‘Lady Death’, with financing support from the South Australia Film Corporation.

== Awards ==
Year	Film	Festival	Award	Status
2015	Wyrmwood	Trieste Science+Fiction Festival	Best International Science Fiction Film	Winner
2015	Wyrmwood	Rondo Hatton Classic Horror Awards	Best Independent Film	Nominee
2018	Wyrmwood – Chronicles of the Dead	Atlanta Horror Film Festival	Best Action Short	Winner
2018	Wyrmwood – Chronicles of the Dead	Grossmann Fantastic Film and Wine Festival	Best Short Movie	Winner
2024	Sting	Golden Scythe Horror Awards	Best International Film	Winner
2025	Beast of War	Motion Picture Sound Editors	Outstanding Achievement in Sound Editing—Non Theatrical Release	Nominee
2026	Beast of War	Australian Academy of Cinema and Television Arts	Best Editing in Film	Nominee
2025	Beast of War	Film Critics Circle of Australia	Best Editing	Nominee
2026	Beast of War	Film Critics Circle of Australia	Best Screenplay	Nominee
2026	Beast of War	Film Critics Circle of Australia	Best Editing	Winner

== Filmography ==
=== Director: ===
- 2008: RoadRunner (short film)
- 2009: War Games (short film)
- 2014: The Wyrmdiaries: Behind the scenes of Wyrmwood (documentary)
- 2014: Wyrmwood
- 2016: Stella
- 2017: Wyrmwood – Chronicles of the Dead (short film)
- 2017: DaemonRunner (short film)
- 2018: Nekrotronic
- 2021: Wyrmwood: Apocalypse
- 2024: Sting
- 2025: Beast of War
- 2027: Lady Death

=== Writer: ===
- 2008: RoadRunner (short film)
- 2009: War Games (short film)
- 2014: Wyrmwood
- 2017: Wyrmwood – Chronicles of the Dead (short film)
- 2017: DaemonRunner (short film)
- 2018: Nekrotronic
- 2021: Wyrmwood: Apocalypse
- 2024: Sting
- 2025: Beast of War
