= Luke McKenzie =

Luke McKenzie may refer to:

- Luke McKenzie (triathlete) (born 1981), Australian long distance triathlete
- Luke McKenzie (actor), Australian actor and filmmaker
