= Shantae Barnes-Cowan =

Australian actress

- Born: 2001 or 2002 (age 23–24); South Australia
- Occupation: Actress
- Notable work: Wyrmwood: Apocalypse; Sweet As; Firebite

Shantae Barnes-Cowan (born 2001 or 2002) is an Aboriginal Australian actress. She starred in the TV series Total Control (2019), Operation Buffalo (2020), and Firebite (2021-2022), and the feature films Wyrmwood: Apocalypse (2021), and Sweet As (2022). Among other accolades, she was nominated for the 2024 AACTA Award for Best Actress in a Leading Role for Sweet As.

== Early life and education ==
Shantae Barnes-Cowan was born in 2001 or 2002 and was placed in a foster family when she was a year old in Whyalla, South Australia. She is very close to her foster parents, the Cowans. She is an Adnyamathanha woman, and has three sisters and seven brothers.

She did not study drama at school, but always admired Deborah Mailman and Jessica Mauboy. In 2021, while studying Year 12 in high school, 18-year-old Barnes-Cowan worked on film sets across Australia. She credited her foster family for helping her juggle her career and education. She completed year 12 at Samaritan College, Whyalla, in 2021.

== Career ==
In her screen debut, Barnes-Cowan played Jess Clarke in season 1 of the award-winning Australian political drama series Total Control in 2019. She played Peggy in Operation Buffalo in May 2020. Adelaide casting director Angela Heesom, who auditioned Barnes-Cowan for the role, said later that she had told her that day that she was going to be an actor and was a "star in the making", who had all the natural instinct. She described her "as an Indigenous version of Julia Roberts".

In 2021, she completed filming the horror film Wyrmwood Apocalypse, playing the character Maxi in her first feature film.

She played the lead role Shanika in the AMC+ international TV miniseries Firebite. Firebite, which was filmed in Adelaide, was created by Warwick Thornton and Brendan Fletcher. Shanika is the adoptive daughter of Tyson, played by Rob Collins, and both play vampire-killing "bloodhunters". The series aims to tell the story of the colonisation of Australia from an Indigenous perspective, using vampires as metaphors for smallpox.

She played the lead role as troubled teen Murra in Jub Clerc's directorial feature debut, the coming-of-age film set in the Pilbara region of Western Australia, Sweet As (2022). She had a leading role in Sweet As, which had its world premiere at the Toronto International Film Festival and won the Crystal Bear at the Berlin Film Festival.

In 2023, she completed filming on a short film, The Redemption, an Australian Western filmed in Tamworth, New South Wales. It was directed by Peter Cameron, and premiered in July 2024.

She moved to Adelaide to study beauty therapy at TAFE, while also auditioning for new roles, including internationally.

In late 2024, Barnes-Cowan was announced in the cast for a second series of Mystery Road: Origin. The series premiered on 21 September 2025 on ABC TV, with all episodes available on iview. Anne Rutherford of Australian Book Review called Barnes-Cowan a "standout of the season", saying that she "carries a natural gravitas that makes her compelling to watch".

== Other activities ==
As a teenager, Barnes-Cowan was an active sportsperson and community leader. She played country and regional netball, as well as regional and state level basketball, representing South Australia.

Barnes-Cowan has been South Australian ambassador for the Indigenous Literacy Foundation.

== Recognition and awards ==
- 2018: Nominated, Young Sisters Dreaming Award in the Gladys Elphick Awards
- 2018: Winner, Whyalla NAIDOC Week award for Female Sportsperson of the Year
- 2020: Whyalla Australia Day Young Citizen of the Year
- 2021: Nominated, Channel 7 Young Achiever Award in the Aboriginal Achievement category
- 2022: Nominated as one of Adelaide's 26 most inspiring women by the Adelaide Advertiser
- 2022: Nominated, Woman of the Year Awards, Rising Star category (SkyCity Adelaide, The Advertiser, and Sunday Mail)
- 2023: Winner, Outstanding Achievement of a Child or Young Person category in the South Australian Child Protection Awards
- 2024: Nominated, AACTA Award for Best Lead Actress in Film, for Sweet As

== Filmography ==
=== Films ===
Year	Title	Role	Notes
2023	The Redemption	Alice	Short
2022	Sweet As	Murra	
2021	Wyrmwood: Apocalypse	Maxi	

=== TV ===
Year	Title	Role	Notes
2021-22	Firebite	Shanika	8 episodes
2019-21	Total Control	Jess Clarke	7 episodes
2020	Operation Buffalo	Peggy	6 episodes
2025	Mystery Road: Origin	Lana	s2
