= Tristan Roache-Turner =

- Born: Sydney, Australia
- Occupations: Screenwriter & Producer for Film and Television
- Known for: Wyrmwood: Road of the Dead (2014) Nekrotronic (2018) Wyrmwood: Apocalypse (2021)
- Relatives: Kiah Roache-Turner

Tristan Roache-Turner is an Australian Film producer and Screenwriter. He is best known for co-creating/co-writing Wyrmwood (2014), Wyrmwood: Apocalypse (2021) and Nekrotronic (2018), alongside his brother Kiah Roache-Turner.

== Film career ==
- Tristan started filmmaking when he was 13, with him and his brother, continuing to shoot music videos and short films throughout the early 20’s, including “The Roadrunner” (2008) and “War Games” (2009), which both went viral online.
- Tristan produced and co-wrote Wyrmwood and also assisted with set building and design. The film garnered International praise, with many referring to it as “Dawn of the Dead meets Mad Max”, and Rotten Tomatoes critics giving the film a respectable 82%. Wyrmwood was also a hit on the Film Festival circuit, receiving nominations at renowned festivals such as the Rondo Hatton Classic Horror Awards, the Australian Academy of Cinema and Television Arts and winning an award for “Best International Science Fiction Film” at the Trieste Science+Fiction Festival.
- In 2017, Tristan and brother Kiah would release a TV Short titled Wyrmwood – Chronicles Of The Dead, which won an award for “Best Short Movie” at Grossmann Fantastic Film and Wine Festival. Both Tristan and Kiah expressed their desires to see the short get picked up for a television series, though this would ultimately never come into fruition.
- In 2018, Tristan co-wrote and produced Nekrotronic, his second feature film. It received far less favourable reviews than Wyrmwood, being scored a low 36% on Rotten Tomatoes.
- 2021 saw the release of Wyrmwood: Apocalypse, the long awaited sequel to the 2014 original. The film garnered equally strong as reviews than its predecessor, receiving a 85% rating according to 20 critics on Rotten Tomatoes.
- Tristan also made a habit of making cameos in all of his films, appearing as a Zombie on two separate occasions in Wyrmwood and as “Finnegan’s Goon” in Nekrotronic.

== Filmography ==
Year	Title	Role	Note
2009	War Games	Producer	Short
2014	Wyrmwood	Writer/Producer	
2017	Wyrmwood – Chronicles Of The Dead	Writer/Producer	TV Short
2017	DaemonRunner	Writer/Prodocuer	Short
2018	Nekrotronic	Writer/Producer	
2021	Wyrmwood: Apocalypse	Writer/Producer	
