= Michael Lira =

Australian film score composer and band leader

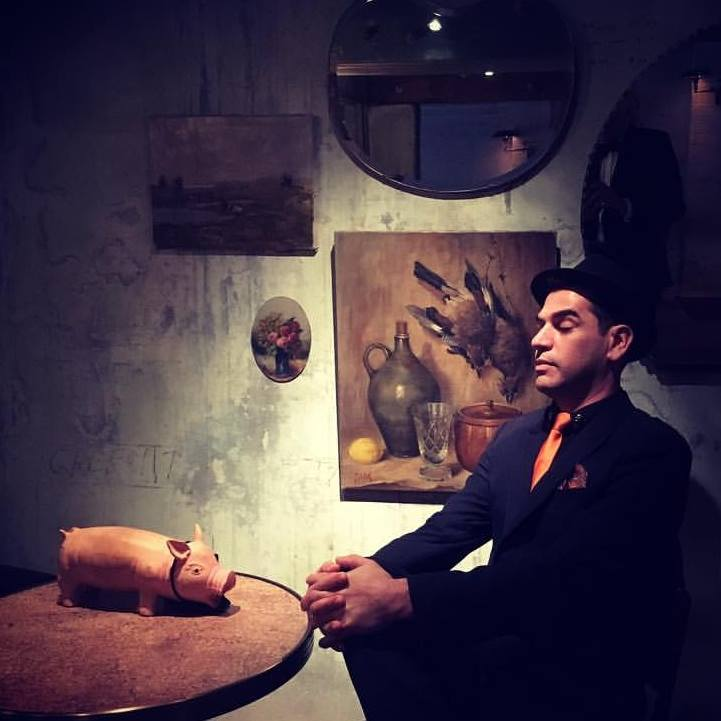

Background information
- Born: 19 February 1975 (age 51)
- Genres: Alternative, lounge metal, film music
- Website: www.michaelliramusic.com

Michael Lira
- Known for: Composer, Musician
- Awards: AACTA For The Hunter, ARIA, APRA Awards

Michael Lira (born 19 February 1975) is an Australian film score composer, band leader as well as an accomplished musician for live physical performance and circus. He is a founding member of experimental bands Vicious Hairy Mary, Darth Vegas and Monsieur Camembert. He has been band leader or musician for Circus Oz, Club Swizzle, Circus Monoxide and Kaput. Soundtrack credits include the films Nekrotronic, The Hunter, Wyrmwood and Interceptor.

== Filmography ==
- The Hunter (2011)
- Wyrmwood (2014)
- Growing Up Smith (2015)
- When the Starlight Ends (2016)
- Los Angeles Overnight (2018)
- Turtle Odyssey (2018)
- The School (2018)
- Nekrotronic (2018)
- Black Water: Abyss (2020)
- Wyrmwood: Apocalypse (2021)
- Interceptor (2022)
- American Outlaws (2023)
- Woody Woodpecker Goes to Camp (2024)

== Awards ==
Year	Nominated work	Category	Award	Result	Notes	Ref.
2022	Interceptor	Feature Film Score of The Year	APRA-AGSC Screen Music Awards	Nominated		
2020	Nekrotronic	Feature Film Score of The Year	APRA-AGSC Screen Music Awards	Nominated		
2017	Skinford	Best Television Theme	APRA-AGSC Screen Music Awards	Nominated		
2017	Iron Spyder	Best Original Score	St Kilda Film Festival	Nominated	shared with Mick Harvey	
2015	Growing Up Smith (AKA Good Ol'Boy)	Feature Film Score of The Year	APRA-AGSC Screen Music Awards	Nominated		
2014	Rake – "Series 3 Episode 1"	Best Music for a Television Series or Serial	APRA-AGSC Screen Music Awards	Nominated	with David McCormack & Antony Partos	
2013	Apart	Tropscore	Tropfest	Won		
2013	A to Z of Contemporary Art	Best Music for a Documentary	APRA-AGSC Screen Music Awards	Won		
2013	Rake – "Season 2 Episode 8: Greene"	Best Music for a Television Series or Serial	APRA-AGSC Screen Music Awards	Nominated	with David McCormack & Antony Partos	
2012	Wild Boys	Best Music for a Television Series or Serial	APRA-AGSC Screen Music Awards	Nominated	with David McCormack	
2012	The Slap	Best Soundtrack Album	APRA-AGSC Screen Music Awards	Won	with Jono Ma & Antony Partos	
2011	The Hunter	Best Original Music Score	AFI / AACTA	Won	with Matteo Zingales & Andrew Lancaster	
2011	The Hunter	Best Original Music Score	Film Critics Circle of Australia Awards	Nominated	with Matteo Zingales & Andrew Lancaster	
2011	Rake	Best Music for a Television Series or Serial	APRA-AGSC Screen Music Awards	Won	with David McCormack & Antony Partos	
2009	Bogan Pride	Best Music for a Television Series or Serial	APRA-AGSC Screen Music Awards	Nominated		
2007	Staines Down Drains	Best Television Theme	APRA-AGSC Screen Music Awards	Won		
2007	Staines Down Drains – "Episode 22: Pipe Dreams"	Best Music for Children's Television	APRA-AGSC Screen Music Awards	Nominated		
2004	The Einstein Factor	Best Television Theme	APRA-AGSC Screen Music Awards	Won		
