= Ngaire Pigram =

Australian actress

- Born: 1978 or 1979 (age 46–47); Broome, Western Australia
- Occupation: Actress
- Years active: 2005 – present
- Notable work: Mystery Road (2020); Sweet As (2022)
- Children: 2
- Family: Stephen Pigram (father)

Ngaire Pigram (born 1978 or 1979) is an Aboriginal Australian singer, dancer, actor, screenwriter, and director from Western Australia. She has worked on stage and in film and television. She is perhaps best known for her role as Leonie in season two of Mystery Road, and as Grace in the 2022 feature film Sweet As.

== Early life and education ==
Ngaire Pirgram was born in Broome, Western Australia in 1978 or 1979, the daughter of Stephen Pigram. She is a Yawuru woman.

After attaining a Certificate IV in Aboriginal Theatre at the Western Australian Academy of Performing Arts in Broome, Pigram was accepted into the three-year diploma course at WAAPA, and in 2004 moved to Perth to pursue further studies in acting.

== Career ==
=== Film and television ===
Pigram played Debbie in the short film Broken Bonds, directed by Ashley Sillifant in the first of the ABC's Deadly Yarns anthology series. One of her earliest film roles was playing the lead in Beck Cole's Plains Empty, which screened at Sundance Film Festival in 2005, and she performed as a dancer in Jimmy Chi's film 2009 Bran Nue Dae, a film version of the stage musical. In 2011 Pigram played Nella, single mother of 15-year-old Bullet, in Brendan Fletcher's drama film Mad Bastards,

In 2013 she was given the opportunity by Screenwest to write and direct a short film, Dark Whispers, which was produced by Kelrick Martin. Her sister Naomi played the lead role, and won a WOW! Award for her performance.

In 2020 she played Leonie, sister of the local police officer Fran, in the second series of Mystery Road.

In September 2020, Pigram was selected as one of eight participants in a new writing and directing initiative organised by WA Indigenous production companies Pink Pepper and Ramu Productions, along with and New Zealand company Brown Sugar Apple Grunt, called the RED project. The project consisted of development workshops enabling each participant to write and direct a 10-minute short film, which would be part of a single anthology 80-minute feature film (working title RED) consisting of stories from a female Aboriginal perspective. The other participants were Kodie Bedford, Debbie Carmody, Kelli Cross, Karla Hart, Chantelle Murray, Jub Clerc, and Mitch Torres.

She played the character Grace in Jub Clerc's debut feature Sweet As in 2022.

In 2026, she appeared as Phoebe in Harvey Zielinski's directorial feature debut, Sweet Milk Lake.

Other screen appearances include as Mrs Marker in an episode of The Circuit (2009); a guest role as Maggie in The Heights (2019); Kitty in Firebite; (2021) and a number of short films.

=== Stage ===
Pigram played Kay in The Sapphires in 2011 with the Belvoir Theatre in Sydney, which toured to London, and in 2019 played Gail in a touring production of the musical directed by its writer, Tony Briggs.

She worked in theatre between 2015 and 2018, performing in Marrugeku's Cut The Sky. The play, which shone an Indigenous perspective on climate change, toured around the world during those three years. The play was based on an historic Aboriginal land rights protest, and featured poems by Edwin Lee Mulligan and songs by singer-songwriters Ngaiire and Nick Cave, which were sung by Pigram.

She played Aunty Theresa in a 2020 revival of the stage production of Bran Nue Dae.

== Recognition and awards ==
For her performance in the second series of Mystery Road she was nominated for the 2020 AACTA Award for Best Guest or Supporting Actress in a Television Drama. The entire cast also won Outstanding Performance by an Ensemble in a Drama Series in the Equity Ensemble Awards.

== Personal life ==
Pigram has two children, whom she raised as a single mother.

== Filmography ==
=== Film ===
Year	Title	Role	Notes
2004	Broken Bonds	Debbie	Short film
2005	Plains Empty	Sam	Short film
2009	The Party Shoes	Patsy	Short film
2009	Bran Nue Dae	Roebuck Hotel dancer	Feature film
2011	Mad Bastards	Nella	Feature film
2012	In the Air	Sue	Short film
2014	Maap Moordak	Mum	Short film
2020	When Morning Comes	May	Short film
2022	Sweet As	Grace	Feature film
2026	Sweet Milk Lake	Phoebe	Feature film

=== Television ===
Year	Title	Role	Notes
2005	Dramatically Black	Young Aboriginal woman	1 episode
2007	Too Late	Gemma	TV short
2009	The Circuit	Mrs Marker	1 episode
2019	The Heights	Maggie	1 episode
2020	Mystery Road	Leonie	Season 2, 6 episodes
2021–2022	Firebite	Kitty	7 episodes

=== As writer / director ===
Year	Title	Role	Notes
2013	Dark Whispers	Writer / director	Short film
2020	RED	Writer	Anthology film

== Stage ==
Year	Title	Role	Notes
2011	The Sapphires	Kay	Belvoir St Theatre, Sydney & Barbican Theatre, London
2015–2018	Cut the Sky	Dungkabah (also songwriter)	Regal Theatre, Perth, WA regional tour, Theater im Pfalzbau, Ludwigshafen, Germany, Grand Théâtre de Luxembourg, Koninklijke Vlaamse Schouwburg, Brussels, Sydney Opera House, Arts House Meat Market, Melbourne, Tjibaou Cultural Centre, Nouméa, New Caledonia, Alexander Kasser Theater, New Jersey, Harbourfront Centre, Toronto with Marrugeku Company
2019	The Sapphires	Gail	
2020	Bran Nue Dae	Aunty Theresa	Riverside Theatres Parramatta, Regal Theatre, Perth
