= Emily Taheny =

Australian actress

- Born: Warooka, Yorke Peninsula, South Australia, Australia
- Occupations: Comedian, television actress, singer
- Years active: 1989–present
- Relatives: Fiona O'Loughlin (sister)

Emily Taheny is an Australian comedian, actress, and singer. She is known for her multiple appearances on the sketch comedy television series Comedy Inc. from 2003 through 2007, her role as "Kat" on the 2009 series The Jesters, and as a regular cast member on long-running satirical news program Shaun Micallef's Mad as Hell.

== Early life and education ==
Emily Taheny grew up in Warooka, Yorke Peninsula, South Australia, one of seven children. Comedian Fiona O'Loughlin is her elder sister.

She graduated from the Centre for Performing Arts in Adelaide. In 2003, she graduated from the College of Country Music in Tamworth, New South Wales.

== Career ==
=== Stage ===
Taheny began doing stand-up comedy in 1989.

In 2001 she collaborated with her sister Fiona O'Loughlin on the stage show Fiona, Her Sister and Some Guy, which they performed first at Warooka, then in Alice Springs, then at the Melbourne Comedy Festival, where it received the Best Newcomer Award at the Melbourne International Comedy Festival. They went on to perform the show at Edinburgh Fringe.

Taheny has also performed at the Adelaide Fringe Melbourne Festival, and further shows at the Melbourne Comedy Festival.

In February 2025 Taheny played chief-of-staff to MP Ruth Mandour (played by Susie Youssef) in the State Theatre Company South Australia political satire Housework, written by Emily Steel and directed by Shannon Rush. InDaily reviewer Murray Bramwell wrote "Taheny is excellent as Anna, the most closely detailed character in the play". Catherine Campbell, writing in The Conversation, called the play "a future Australian classic – a Housework is a future Australian classic – a Don's Party for our time", and wrote "Taheny effortlessly makes the whip-smart staffer Anna multifaceted, with internal conflict alongside high-energy pragmatism and expertly timed comedy".

=== Screen ===
Taheny made her television debut on Comedy Inc. in 2003, playing various characters on the show until its cancellation in 2007. In 2005, she made a guest appearance on Spicks and Specks. In 2006, she appeared on The Chaser's War on Everything, singing a song alongside Andrew Hansen's Crazy Warehouse character. She appeared as "Kat" in the 2009 television series The Jesters, and has appeared in the series Sleuth 101.

From 2012 to 2022, she was a regular cast member on the Australian Broadcasting Corporation's satirical news program Shaun Micallef's Mad as Hell, playing numerous recurring and one-off characters, and she competed in a special Mad As Hell does Hard Quiz in 2022.

In 2017, she appeared in the first episode of True Story with Hamish & Andy. In 2018 she starred in the comedy film The Flip Side. In 2019, Taheny appeared in Channel 7 series Secret Bridesmaids Business.

== Awards and nominations ==
- 2001: Winner, Best Newcomer Award at the Melbourne International Comedy Festival
- 2002: Winner, Fringe Cabaret Award at the Melbourne Festival for her performance in Cliff Hanger

== Filmography ==
=== Film ===
Year	Title	Role	Notes
2014	The Heckler	Emma	
2015	Now Add Honey	Detective Davis	
2018	That's Not My Dog!	Herself	
2018	The Flip Side	Ronnie	Lead role
2025	Kangaroo	Dorinda	

=== Television ===
Year	Title	Role	Notes	Ref
2003–07	Comedy Inc.	Various	Regular role	
2007	Stupid, Stupid Man	Shona	"The Black Dog"	
2009–11	The Jesters	Kat Bailey	Main role	
2010	Sleuth 101	Hermoine / Rebecca	"Delete Cache", "Performance Enhancing Death"	
2012–2022	Shaun Micallef's Mad as Hell	Various	Regular role	
2013–14	It's a Date	Manda	"Should You Date on the Rebound?", "What's the Worst Thing That Can Happen on a Date?"	
2014	INXS: Never Tear Us Apart	Annie	TV miniseries	
2015	Open Slather	Various	Regular role	
2016	Little Acorns	Emily	9 episodes	
2017	Get Krack!n	Rebecca Slaw	Episode 1	
2018	How to Stay Married	Claire	1 episodes	
2019	Secret Bridesmaids' Business	Nicole	3 episodes	
2021	Fraud Festival	Emily	TV movie	
2021-22	Bluey	Wendy	4 episodes	
2022	Hard Quiz	Herself	1 episode	
2023	Monologue	Monique	6 episodes	
2023	Bay of Fires	Jodie	7 episodes	
2023	Plausible Deniability	Ashlee Beake	2 episodes	
2024	Population 11	Audrey	10 episodes	
2024	Thou Shalt Not Steal	Karen	2 episodes	

=== Self appearances ===
Year	Title	Role	Notes
2019	Celebrity Name Game	Herself	1 episode
2017	Behave Yourself!	Herself	Contestant, episode 1
2016–2017	All Star Family Feud	Herself	2 episodes
