= Sting (film) =

2024 film by Kiah Roache-Turner

- Theatrical release poster
- Directed by: Kiah Roache-Turner
- Written by: Kiah Roache-Turner
- Produced by: Jamie Hilton; Michael Pontin; Chris Brown
- Starring: Ryan Corr; Alyla Browne; Penelope Mitchell; Robyn Nevin; Noni Hazelhurst; Silvia Colloca; Danny Kim; Jermaine Fowler
- Cinematography: Brad Shield
- Edited by: Luke Doolan; Kiah Roache-Turner
- Music by: Anna Drubich
- Production companies: Screen Australia; Align; Screen NSW; Cumulus VFX; Spectrum Entertainment; See Pictures; Pictures in Paradise
- Distributed by: Well Go USA Entertainment (United States); StudioCanal (Select territories)
- Release date: April 12, 2024 (United States)
- Running time: 92 minutes
- Countries: Australia; United States
- Language: English
- Box office: $2.7 million

Sting is a 2024 science fiction supernatural horror film written and directed by Kiah Roache-Turner, and starring Ryan Corr, Alyla Browne, Penelope Mitchell, Robyn Nevin, Noni Hazelhurst, Silvia Colloca, Danny Kim, and Jermaine Fowler. The film follows a young girl who secretly raises a spider as her pet, which then transforms into a giant monster.

Sting was released in the United States and Canada on April 12, 2024.

== Plot ==
One cold, stormy night in New York City, Charlotte, a rebellious 12-year-old girl lives in a dilapidated apartment building with her overworked step-father, Ethan, her mother Heather and baby half-brother Liam. Charlotte is often left on her own and stumbles upon a tiny spider hatched from a strange, glowing object that crash-lands in her great-aunt's apartment. Intrigued, she decides to keep the spider as a pet, naming it Sting.

As Charlotte cares for Sting, who also learns to whistle from Charlotte's iPhone ringtone, the spider begins to grow at an alarming rate. She initially keeps its size a secret, but as it becomes more difficult to hide, her step-father and neighbors start to notice strange occurrences around the building. Sting's growing size and insatiable appetite soon lead to the death of pets and residents. Charlotte's relationship with her step-father is strained over the reality of her biological father. During a meltdown from Ethan, Sting attacks both parents while Charlotte is nearby, oblivious with her brother.

The tension escalates when Sting, now a gigantic spider, traps several residents in the building. Charlotte, who has seen Sting's aversion to mothballs, goes on a hunt for her now missing family with a mothball and water. When Charlotte tries to save Ethan, they face numerous obstacles, including Sting's intelligence and adaptability. Sting attacks the group in the trash compactor of the building's basement.

Charlotte manages to lure Sting into a trap with the help of Ethan. Using a trash compression device, they destroy Sting. Although Charlotte's family is safe, they do not realize that Sting has laid several eggs and one begins to hatch.

== Cast ==
- Ryan Corr as Ethan Miller, Charlotte's overworked stepfather
- Alyla Browne as Charlotte Krouse, Heather's daughter
- Penelope Mitchell as Heather Miller, Charlotte's mother
- Robyn Nevin as Gunter, Heather's aunt
- Noni Hazelhurst as Helga, Heather's mother
- Silvia Colloca as Maria
- Danny Kim as Erik John Kwong
- Jermaine Fowler as Frank
- Tony J Black as Officer Miller
- Jett Berry and Kade Berry as Liam Miller, Charlotte's younger half-brother
- Lee Perry as the documentary narrator

== Production ==
Principal photography took place in Sydney and wrapped in February 2023.

== Release ==
Sting was released on April 12, 2024, in the United States by Well Go USA Entertainment.

The film was released in New Zealand on 16 May 2024, the United Kingdom on 31 May 2024, Germany on 20 June 2024 and Australia on 18 July 2024.

== Reception ==
=== Box office ===
Sting grossed $825,797 from 975 cinemas during its opening weekend in North America (United States, Canada and Puerto Rico).

The film made $2.5 million worldwide, with its release in North America accounting for almost 50% of that and with its international revenue at $1.4 million.

=== Critical response ===
On the review aggregator website Rotten Tomatoes, 70% of 116 critics' reviews are positive. The website's consensus reads: "Sting should satisfy horror fans in the mood for a creature feature, even if the end results won't likely linger in the memory." Metacritic, which uses a weighted average, assigned the film a score of 57 out of 100, based on 16 critics, indicating "mixed or average" reviews.

Meagan Navarro of Bloody Disgusting gave it a score of 3/5, writing, "Thanks to Browne's bold performance and an emphasis on practical creature effects, Sting works as an entertaining throwback creature feature." Bill Goodykoontz of The Arizona Republic also gave it 3/5 stars, calling it "a solid if unspectacular entry into the eww-gross-spiders category... But when it tries to wedge in some version of Meaningful Family Drama, it loses its way a little bit." Variety's Owen Gleiberman said the film was "a blithe apartment-house riff on Alien crossed with elements of The Shining". He concluded, "Sting is never more than a cheeseball trifle, but at least the film knows it."

IndieWire's David Ehrlich gave the film a C grade, writing, "There's decent fun to be had in this crafty and contained Aussie skin-crawler... but Sting is a bit too small for its massive alien spider to maneuver itself in unexpected ways, and the tender human story that Roache-Turner weaves around her lacks the bite it needs to melt your heart or liquify any of your other organs." Simon Abrams of RogerEbert.com gave it 2/4 stars, writing, "The makers of Sting... have obviously seen a lot of genre movies, but that cinephilia doesn't translate into good cheap thrills or crowd-pleasing adventure drama."
