= Sweet As =

- Directed by: Jub Clerc
- Written by: Jub Clerc; Steve Rodgers
- Produced by: Liz Kearney
- Starring: Shantae Barnes-Cowan; Mark Coles Smith
- Cinematography: Katie Milwright
- Edited by: Katie Flaxman
- Production company: Arenamedia
- Distributed by: Roadshow Films
- Release date: 13 August 2022 (Melbourne)
- Running time: 87 minutes
- Country: Australia
- Language: English

Sweet As is a 2022 Australian coming-of-age drama film, directed by Jub Clerc, starring Shantae Barnes-Cowan and Mark Coles Smith.

== Synopsis ==
Murra, an Aboriginal Australian girl from a troubled family, discovers a passion for photography while participating in a youth retreat.

== Cast ==
- Shantae Barnes-Cowan as Murra
- Mark Coles Smith as Ian, Murra's uncle
- Ngaire Pigram as Grace, Murra's mother
- Tasma Walton as Mitch, group leader
- Carlos Sanson, Jr. as Fernando, photographer teaching the group
- Pedrea Jackson as Elvis
- Mikayla Levy as Kylie
- Andrew Wallace as Sean
- Mark Cometti as Simmo

== Production ==
Sweet As was directed by Jub Clerc. It was written by Clerc and Steve Rodgers, and produced by Liz Kearney.

It is the first Western Australian feature film directed by an Indigenous Australian person, and the film was shot on location in the Pilbara region of Western Australia.

Screen Australia provided major funding investment, with additional funding coming from Screenwest and Lotterywest, and support from the Western Australian Regional Film Fund Melbourne International Film Festival Premiere Fund and Film Victoria.

== Release and festival screenings ==
The film premiered on 13 August 2022 at the Melbourne International Film Festival, and had its international premiere at the 2022 Toronto International Film Festival in September 2022.

Screening at the 73rd Berlin International Film Festival in February 2023, the film took home the Crystal Bear. In March 2023 it screened at the Birrarangga Film Festival in Melbourne.

Distribution rights for Australia and New Zealand were acquired by Roadshow Films, and Sweet As was released in Australian cinemas from 1 June 2023. It was subsequently made available on streaming services Binge, Foxtel and Amazon Prime Video.

The film was selected in country focus section "Best of Contemporary Australian Cinema" at the 29th Kolkata International Film Festival held from 5 December to 12 December 2023.

== Awards and nominations ==
- 2022: Winner, Innovation Award, Melbourne International Film Festival, for Sweet As
- 2022: Winner, NETPAC Award for best film from the Asia/Pacific region, Toronto International Film Festival, for best film from the Asia/Pacific region, for Sweet As
- 2022: Nominated, Asia Pacific Screen Award for Best Youth Film, for Sweet As
- 2022: Nominated, Feature Film – Original at the 55th AWGIE Awards
- 2023: Winner, Crystal Bear in the Generation Kplus section, 73rd Berlin International Film Festival, for Sweet As
- 2023: Nominated, Best Direction in a Debut Feature Film at the ADG Awards, for Sweet As
- 2024: Nominated, AACTA Award for Best Direction at the 13th AACTA Awards, for Sweet As
