= The Flip Side =

2018 film by Marion Pilowsky

- Theatrical release poster
- Directed by: Marion Pilowsky
- Written by: Marion Pilowsky; Lee Sellars
- Produced by: Sue Murray; Marion Pilowsky; David Willing
- Starring: Eddie Izzard; Emily Taheny; Vanessa Guide; Luke McKenzie
- Cinematography: Steve Arnold
- Edited by: Denise Haratzis
- Music by: Luis Almau
- Production companies: Fox International Productions; Screen Australia; South Australian Film Corporation; Corner Table Productions
- Distributed by: 20th Century Fox
- Release date: August 30, 2018
- Running time: 91 minutes
- Country: Australia
- Language: English

The Flip Side is a 2018 Australian romantic comedy film starring Eddie Izzard, Emily Taheny, Vanessa Guide and Luke McKenzie.

== Cast ==
- Eddie Izzard as Henry
- Emily Taheny as Ronnie
- Vanessa Guide as Sophie
- Luke McKenzie as Jeff
- Tina Bursill as Iris
- Hugh Sheridan as Nigel
- Jodie Dry as Gail
- Tiriel Mora as The Mechanic

== Reception ==
Rotten Tomatoes lists 5 critics with 1 assessed as fresh and 4 as rotten. It gave the film a score of 20%.

Carmen Paddock of One Room With A View gave it 3 out of 5 concluding "There is nothing unduly special about The Flip Side, a fairly standard rom-com that balances out the genre’s worst elements with charming performances and a surprisingly strong third act. It is a pleasant, perfectly entertaining two hours, though it may not stick long in the memory afterwards." Paul Byrnes of the Canberra Times writes "There is some humour here, but barely enough to sustain the journey. Pilowsky tries hard to create a thoughtful comedy about grown-up dilemmas that will resonate with women - but the script isn't strong enough to carry the weight." The Australian's Stephen Romei gave it 2.5 stars and writes "There is also some emotional depth, some asking of important questions, particularly in the scenes between Izzard and Taheny. But stretching this out to movie-length, which means adding some silly, unnecessary scenes such as a visit to a bowling alley, weakens the web." Herald Sun's Leigh Paatsch gave it 1.5 stars calling it "a broken Australian rom-com where the rom just never happens", adding "As for the com, it keeps entering and leaving the room like a drunk who has lost some keys. It doesn’t stick around for long, but you do notice when it’s there." Graeme Tuckett on Stuff gave it 1 star stating it is "a film so bland, pointless and incompetently assembled as to almost defy belief." Leigh Paatcsh movie review: "Aussie rom-com The Flip Side can’t find the rom, can’t bring the com." Film Bunker's review was positive but lukewarm overall, detailed review. Mark Blackmore on ThisIsFilm gave an overly negative review, stating the film was shot on the cheap, and shoddy. Paul Byrnes of Sydney Morning Herald summed it up as more message than mirth. Doug Jamieson of TheAuReview.com described it as breezy and enjoyable but far too safe and predictable.
