= The Dog House Australia =

Australian television show

- Genre: Factual television
- Based on: The Dog House by Nick Mirsky
- Narrated by: Chris Brown (seasons 1–2); Mark Coles Smith (seasons 3–4); Henry Nixon (season 5–)
- Country of origin: Australia
- Original language: English
- No. of seasons: 5
- No. of episodes: 59

Production
- Executive producer: Samantha De Alwis
- Production locations: Kemps Creek, New South Wales
- Running time: 60–70 minutes

Original release
- Network: Network 10
- Release: 12 October 2021 – present

The Dog House Australia is an Australian factual observational television series that matches dogs to new owners and is based on the British television series of the same name, which premiered on Network 10 on 12 October 2021.

== Production and release ==
The series was filmed at Kemps Creek, New South Wales.

The first season premiered on 12 October 2021, narrated by veterinarian Chris Brown. The series was renewed for a second season in October 2021 and premiered on 8 March 2022.

A third season was renewed in October 2022 and premiered on 8 February 2023 with actor Mark Coles Smith replacing Brown as series narrator. Auditions for a fourth season opened in September 2023, which began airing on 1 February 2024.

On Wednesday 26 February 2025, the fifth season premiered, with actor Henry Nixon taking over narrating duties from Coles Smith.

== Episodes ==
=== Series overview ===
| Series | Episodes | Originally released | |
| Series | Episodes | First released | Last released |
|---|---|---|---|
| 1 | 10 | 12 October 2021 | 21 December 2021 |
| 2 | 12 | 8 March 2022 | 18 August 2022 |
| 3 | 11 | 8 February 2023 | 29 March 2023 |
| 4 | 14 | 1 February 2024 | 3 December 2024 |
| 5 | 12 | 26 February 2025 | 14 August 2024 |

=== Season 1 (2021) ===
| No. overall | No. in season | Title | Timeslot | Original release date | Viewers |
|---|---|---|---|---|---|
| 1 | 1 | "Episode 1" | 7:30pm Tuesday | 12 October 2021 | 480,000 |
| 2 | 2 | "Episode 2" | 7:30pm Tuesday | 19 October 2021 | 507,000 |
| 3 | 3 | "Episode 3" | 7:30pm Tuesday | 26 October 2021 | 507,000 |
| 4 | 4 | "Episode 4" | 7:30pm Tuesday | 2 November 2021 | 566,000 |
| 5 | 5 | "Episode 5" | 7:30pm Tuesday | 9 November 2021 | 575,000 |
| 6 | 6 | "Episode 6" | 7:30pm Tuesday | 16 November 2021 | 521,000 |
| 7 | 7 | "Episode 7" | 7:30pm Tuesday | 23 November 2021 | 535,000 |
| 8 | 8 | "Episode 8" | 7:30pm Tuesday | 7 December 2021 | 479,000 |
| 9 | 9 | "Episode 9" | 7:30pm Tuesday | 14 December 2021 | 433,000 |
| 10 | 10 | "Episode 10" | 7:30pm Tuesday | 21 December 2021 | 433,000 |

=== Season 2 (2022) ===
| No. overall | No. in season | Title | Timeslot | Original release date | Viewers |
|---|---|---|---|---|---|
| 11 | 1 | "Episode 1" | 7:30pm Tuesday | 8 March 2022 | ? |
| 12 | 2 | "Episode 2" | 7:30pm Tuesday | 15 March 2022 | ? |
| 13 | 3 | "Episode 3" | 7:30pm Tuesday | 22 March 2022 | ? |
| 14 | 4 | "Episode 4" | 7:30pm Tuesday | 29 March 2022 | ? |
| 15 | 5 | "Episode 5" | 7:30pm Tuesday | 5 April 2022 | ? |
| 16 | 6 | "Episode 6" | 7:30pm Monday | 11 April 2022 | ? |
| 17 | 7 | "Episode 7" | 7:30pm Tuesday | 12 April 2022 | ? |
| 18 | 8 | "Episode 8" | 7:30pm Thursday | 14 July 2022 | ? |
| 19 | 9 | "Episode 9" | 7:30pm Thursday | 21 July 2022 | ? |
| 20 | 10 | "Episode 10" | 7:30pm Thursday | 4 August 2022 | ? |
| 21 | 11 | "Episode 11" | 7:30pm Thursday | 11 August 2022 | ? |
| 22 | 12 | "The Celebrity Dog House Australia" | 7:30pm Thursday | 18 August 2022 | ? |

=== Season 3 (2023) ===
| No. overall | No. in season | Title | Timeslot | Original release date | Viewers |
|---|---|---|---|---|---|
| 23 | 1 | "Episode 1" | 7:30pm Wednesday | 8 February 2023 | 325,000 |
| 24 | 2 | "Episode 2" | 7:30pm Wednesday | 15 February 2023 | 324,000 |
| 25 | 3 | "Episode 3" | 7:30pm Wednesday | 22 February 2023 | 310,000 |
| 26 | 4 | "Episode 4" | 7:30pm Wednesday | 1 March 2023 | 298,000 |
| 27 | 5 | "Episode 5" | 7:30pm Wednesday | 8 March 2023 | 326,000 |
| 28 | 6 | "Episode 6" | 7:30pm Tuesday | 14 March 2023 | 288,000 |
| 29 | 7 | "Episode 7" | 7:30pm Wednesday | 15 March 2023 | 307,000 |
| 30 | 8 | "Episode 8" | 7:30pm Tuesday | 21 March 2023 | 318,000 |
| 31 | 9 | "Episode 9" | 7:30pm Wednesday | 22 March 2023 | 304,000 |
| 32 | 10 | "Episode 10" | 7:30pm Tuesday | 28 March 2023 | 365,000 |
| 33 | 11 | "Episode 11" | 7:30pm Wednesday | 29 March 2023 | N/A |

=== Season 4 (2024) ===
| No. overall | No. in season | Title | Timeslot | Original release date | Viewers |
|---|---|---|---|---|---|
| 34 | 1 | "Episode 1" | 7:30pm Thursday | 1 February 2024 | 354,000 |
| 35 | 2 | "Episode 2" | 7:30pm Thursday | 8 February 2024 | 396,000 |
| 36 | 3 | "Episode 3" | 7:30pm Thursday | 15 February 2024 | 367,000 |
| 37 | 4 | "Episode 4" | 7:30pm Thursday | 22 February 2024 | 422,000 |
| 38 | 5 | "Episode 5" | 7:30pm Thursday | 29 February 2024 | 462,000 |
| 39 | 6 | "Episode 6" | 7:30pm Thursday | 7 March 2024 | 405,000 |
| 40 | 7 | "Episode 7" | 7:30pm Wednesday | 13 March 2024 | 291,000 |
| 41 | 8 | "Episode 8" | 7:30pm Thursday | 14 March 2024 | 383,000 |
| 42 | 9 | "Episode 9" | 7:30pm Wednesday | 20 March 2024 | 273,000 |
| 43 | 10 | "Episode 10" | 7:30pm Thursday | 21 March 2024 | 346,000 |
| 44 | 11 | "Episode 11" | Sunday | 4 August 2024 | TBC |
| 45 | 12 | "Celebrity Episode" | Sunday | 4 August 2024 | TBC |
| 46 | 13 | "Tails of Redemption" | 7:30pm Sunday | 27 October 2024 | 240,000 |
| 47 | 14 | "The Dog House Australia: All Shapes and Sizes" | 7:30pm Tuesday | 3 December 2024 | 303,000 |

=== Season 5 (2025) ===
| No. overall | No. in season | Title | Timeslot | Original release date | Viewers |
|---|---|---|---|---|---|
| 48 | 1 | "Episode 1" | 7:30pm Wednesday | 26 February 2025 | 301,000 |
| 49 | 2 | "Episode 2" | 7:30pm Wednesday | 5 March 2025 | 301,000 |
| 50 | 3 | "Episode 3" | 7:30pm Wednesday | 12 March 2025 | 314,000 |
| 51 | 4 | "Episode 4" | 7:30pm Wednesday | 26 March 2025 | 350,000 |
| 52 | 5 | "Episode 5" | 7:30pm Tuesday | 1 April 2025 | 353,000 |
| 53 | 6 | "Episode 6" | 7:30pm Tuesday | 8 April 2025 | 396,000 |
| 54 | 7 | "Episode 7" | 7:30pm Wednesday | 9 April 2025 | 342,000 |
| 55 | 8 | "Episode 8" | 7:30pm Tuesday | 15 April 2025 | 412,000 |
| 56 | 9 | "Episode 9" | 7:30pm Wednesday | 16 April 2025 | 313,000 |
| 57 | 10 | "Episode 10" | 7:30pm Tuesday | 22 April 2025 | 377,000 |
| 58 | 11 | "Episode 11" | 7:30pm Wednesday | 23 April 2025 | 334,000 |
| 59 | 12 | "Episode 12" | 7:30pm Wednesday | 14 August 2025 | 325,000 |
