= Alyla Browne =

Estonian–Australian actress (born 2009 or 2010)

- Born: 2009 or 2010 (age 16–17); Sydney, New South Wales, Australia
- Citizenship: Estonia; Australia
- Occupation: Actress
- Years active: 2015–present

Alyla Kaija Browne (born 2009 or 2010) is an Estonian–Australian actress. She is best known for starring as the young Imperator Furiosa in Furiosa: A Mad Max Saga (2024) for which she was nominated for an AACTA Award for Best Supporting Actress. She has also played the title role in the television series The Lost Flowers of Alice Hart (2023) and the role of Maria Robotnik in the film Sonic the Hedgehog 3 (2024).

== Early life ==
Browne was born in Sydney, New South Wales. She is a dual citizen of Estonia and Australia. Her family moved to the United States when she was six weeks old. Her father is a plastic recycling magnate.

Browne developed an interest in acting after her two older sisters started taking lessons at the Beverly Hills Playhouse. She attends a performing arts school in Sydney.

== Career ==
Browne started acting in television commercials when she was six. She was cast in her first television role on Mr Inbetween, an Australian black comedy series, in 2019.

Browne has appeared as the daughter of Masha Dmitrichenko in Nine Perfect Strangers, Alice Hart in The Lost Flowers of Alice Hart, young Alithea Binnie in Three Thousand Years of Longing, and Verity in the 2023 Australian film The Secret Kingdom.

In 2021, Browne was cast as young Imperator Furiosa in Furiosa: A Mad Max Saga. Director George Miller said that she reminded him of a young Furiosa and that she impressed him while doing the splits on set while filming Three Thousand Years of Longing. Rachel Handler of Vulture noted that Browne's reception at the film's 2024 Cannes premiere was "the loudest and most enthusiastic" aside from the reception for Miller himself.

In 2024, Browne starred as Charlotte in the horror film Sting, which was released that April. She was later cast as Maria Robotnik in Sonic the Hedgehog 3. She appeared in the Australian film Whale Shark Jack and was cast in the psychological horror film From Below, which was released in 2026.

== Personal life ==
Browne is an animal lover and roller skater. She owned a pet jumping spider, which she released. Her other hobbies include surfing, roller skating, sewing, and teaching her dog and cat to do tricks. Browne dreams of writing and directing her own productions, as she enjoys the excitement of being on a set.

== Filmography ==
Key
†	Denotes productions that have not yet been released

=== Film ===
Year	Title	Role	Ref.
2020	Children of the Corn	Angela Pratt	
2022	Three Thousand Years of Longing	Young Alithea Binnie	
2023	The Secret Kingdom	Verity	
2023	True Spirit	Young Jessica Watson	
2024	Sting	Charlotte Krouse	
2024	Furiosa: A Mad Max Saga	Young Imperator Furiosa	
2024	Sonic the Hedgehog 3	Maria Robotnik	
2026	Whale Shark Jack	Sarah	
2026	Thrash	Dee Olsen	
2026	From Below †	Riley	

=== Television ===
Year	Title	Role	Notes	Ref.
2019	Mr Inbetween	Maddy	2 episodes	
2021	Eden	Young Hedwig	2 episodes	
2021	Nine Perfect Strangers	Tatiana	Recurring role	
2023	The Lost Flowers of Alice Hart	Alice Hart	Recurring role	
2026	The Artful Dodger	Cassandra Mumby	Episode: "Belle of the Ball"	

== Awards and nominations ==
Year	Association	Category	Work	Result	Ref.
2024	Young Artist Awards	Best Performance in a Streaming Series: Leading Youth Artist	The Lost Flowers of Alice Hart	Nominated	
2024	Logie Awards	Graham Kennedy Award for Most Popular New Talent	The Lost Flowers of Alice Hart	Nominated	
2025	AACTA	Award for Best Supporting Actress in Film	Furiosa: A Mad Max Saga	Nominated	
2025	Critics' Choice Awards	Best Young Actor/Actress	Furiosa: A Mad Max Saga	Nominated	
