= Bianca Bradey =

Australian actress

Bianca Bradey is an Australian actress who starred in Wyrmwood and its sequel Wyrmwood: Apocalypse.

== Early life and education ==
Bradey was raised in a bushland area of Sydney. She wanted to be an actor from a young age, joining drama clubs and performing in plays and musicals during her school years and completing acting as part of her Higher School Certificate. After her high school graduation, she abandoned acting, due to struggles with shyness, stage fright and the fear of failure. In her early twenties, Bradey explored other career paths, before enrolling at National Institute of Dramatic Art (NIDA) at the age of 25, where she studied screen acting.

== Career ==
After her time at NIDA, Bradey initially began landing small roles and auditions. In 2011, she appeared in the film Wrath. before eventually landing her breakout role as Brooke in 2014 indie Aussie zombie action-horror film Wyrmwood. She worked on the film for around eighteen months, and prepared for the role by training in kickboxing and circuit training with an MMA trainer. The film premiered at Fantastic Fest in Texas and screened in Los Angeles and Sydney, becoming an international cult hit.

Bradey then played the ongoing role of lesbian character Emily Rochford in acclaimed drama series Starting From … Now!, which began as a web series, before being broadcast on SBS2. The series reached a global audience and expanded her range beyond action and horror. During this time, she also starred in anthology film A Night of Horror: Volume 1, playing Sam in the segment "Life Imitates". In 2016, she landed a role in sci-fi film The Osiris Child: Science Fiction Volume One, alongside Kellan Lutz, Rachel Griffiths and Isabel Lucas. She also played the title role in short film Nancy in Hell, based on the cult horror comic of the same name by Spanish writer El Torres.

Bradey was next cast as the lead in a U.S. film, but two days before production began, her visa fell through and the film proceeded without her. Following this, she was cast in 2017 Finnish superhero movie, Rendel, after director Jesse Haaja saw her performance in Wyrmwood. The film was shot in Lapland, in northern Finland, in minus 30 degree temperatures, where she also performed her own stunts, including fight scenes and gun work.

In 2019, Bradey had a starring role as Jana in horror film Turbines. That same year, she also had an ongoing role as manipulative stepmother Alma in web miniseries The Pet Killer.

Bradey then reprised her role as Brooke in the long-awaited Wyrmwood sequel, Wyrmwood: Apocalypse in 2021. More recently, she landed the role of Zoe Chadwick in the film It’s Our Time, after gaining the attention of independent filmmaker Joy Hopwood, when she auditioned for her previous film The Gift That Gives.

== Personal life ==
Bradey's fitness training in preparation for her role in Wyrmwood led her to eventually becoming a qualified Pilates instructor.

== Filmography ==
=== Film ===
Year	Title	Role	Notes	Ref.
2009	This Woman's World	Sarah	Short film	
2010	The Reason Behind Me	Holly	Short film	
2011	House of Sticks	Sophie	Short film	
2011	Wrath	Emma	Short film	
2011	The Writer's Muse	Audrey	Short film	
2012	The Washing Machine	Elizabeth	Short film	
2013	Last Days of Eden	Robin	Short film	
2013	The Father, Son and the Holy Spirit	Sophie Harris	Short film	
2013	Crap Date	Sarah	Short film	
2014	Wyrmwood (aka Wyrmwood: Road of the Dead)	Brooke		
2015	A Night of Horror: Volume 1	Sam	Segment: "Life Imitates"	
2015	The Briefcase	Waitress	Short film	
2015	A Private Matter	Charlie	Short film	
2015	We Will	Claire	Short film	
2016	The Osiris Child: Science Fiction Volume One	Shae Holliday		
2016	Perfect Fit	Ava	Short film (Also co-writer)	
2016	Nancy in Hell	Nancy Summons	Short film	
2017	Rendel (aka Rendel: Dark Vengeance)	Stacy		
2018	Shift	Molly	Short film	
2018	Violent Starr	Violent Starr		
2019	Brazen – Demon Huntress	Brazen	Short film	
2019	Once an Angel	Black Angel / White Angel	Short film	
2019	Red Eleven: Starry Eyes	Girl with starry eyes	Short film	
2019	Turbines	Jana		
2019	Hear Me	Raving	Short film (Also co-writer)	
2020	Reflection	Alice	Short film	
2020	After the Flames: An Apocalypse Anthology	Fighter		
2021	Wyrmwood: Apocalypse	Brooke		
2025	It's Our Time	Zoe Chadwick		

=== Television ===
Year	Title	Role	Notes	Ref.
2010	Trouble in Paradise	Sarah		
2010	I Rock	Jennifer	1 episode	
2010	Rake	Tammy	1 episode	
2014–2016	Starting From … Now!	Emily Rochford	25 episodes	
2017	Black Spot	Sophie	1 episode	
2019	The Pet Killer	Alma	Miniseries, 10 episodes	
2020	Keihäsmatkat	Juanita	6 episodes	
2020	Snares of the Devil	Blair	1 episode	

=== Music videos ===
Year	Title	Role	Notes	Ref.
2022	The Rasmus – Jezebel	Mansion Coat People		

=== TVC ===
Year	Title	Role	Ref.
2011	Panasonic: Air Conditioning	Wife	
2012	Holden	Cafe Girl	
2012	Slater & Gordon	Girl	
2013	KFC	Angry girlfriend	
2013	Dare Ice Coffee	Girlfriend	
