= Turtle Odyssey =

- Film poster
- Directed by: Caspar Mazzotti; Paul Phelan
- Written by: Amelia McCarten; Paul Phelan
- Produced by: David Gross
- Narrated by: Russell Crowe
- Cinematography: Caspar Mazzotti; Jon Shaw
- Edited by: Caspar Mazzotti; Paul Phelan
- Music by: Michael Lira
- Distributed by: SK Films
- Release date: June 30, 2018
- Running time: 41 minutes
- Country: Australia
- Language: English

Turtle Odyssey is a 2018 Australian documentary short about a sea turtle named Bunji. The documentary was directed by Paul Phelan and Caspar Mazzotti and narrated by Russell Crowe.

== Release ==
The film premiered on June 30, 2018, at the Virginia Aquarium. It also showed at the Fleet Science Center on July 5, 2019. Then it was released on DVD and Blu-ray on December 3, 2019. It was also shown at the California Science Center on February 7, 2020.

== Reception ==
Renee Schonfeld of Common Sense Media awarded the film four stars out of five. Josh Board of KSWB-TV awarded the film five stars.

Peter Keough of The Boston Globe gave the film a positive review and wrote, "Though the images of ocean vistas and sea life are breathtaking, a critic might sniff at the film’s anthropomorphism and manipulative, formulaic narrative."

Sheri Linden of The Hollywood Reporter also gave the film a positive review and wrote, "Familiar structure, fascinating star."
