= Jub Clerc =

Australian film director and screenwriter

- Born: Western Australia
- Occupations: Actor, playwright, film director, and screenwriter
- Years active: c. 2000 – present
- Notable work: Sweet As
- Children: 1

Jub Clerc, also known as Suzanne Jub Clerc, is a Indigenous Australian actor, playwright, film director, and screenwriter. She has worked in film and television since the early 2000s and has also worked in theatre. She is best known for her 2022 debut feature Sweet As.

== Early life and education ==
Suzanne Jub Clerc is a Nyulnyul and Yawuru woman. Her mother was actress Sylvia Clarke. Clarke grew up around Beagle Bay, Broome, in the Kimberley region in Western Australia, while Clerc grew up around Port Hedland, in the Pilbara. So although her ancestors were from the Nyul Nyul/Yawuru peoples of the Kimberleys, her family married into the Pilbara families four or five generations ago.

At the age of 14, Clerc was encouraged by her teachers to go on a photography trip for teenagers around the Pilbara. She did not realise it at the time, but the group were considered at-risk adolescents, after her grades had dropped due to an absent mother and somewhat troubled home life. She later said that this trip changed her life, enabling her to see other possibilities outside her home town, a mining town. Straight after this trip, she was flown to Broome, where her mother was rehearsing for the stage musical production of Bran Nue Dae, and stayed at the upmarket Cable Beach Club. Clerc sang backstage and toured with her mother for four years.

When she was 18 she was accepted into the Aboriginal Theatre Training program that emerged from Bran Nue Dae. She graduated from the Western Australian Academy of Performing Arts in 1997, after undertaking a three-year course in acting.

== Career ==
Clerc has said that she likes to write comedy, or dramedy, even about serious themes. She started writing because she wanted to write roles that represented people like her, as there were not many roles for Indigenous people that were written or directed by Indigenous people.

=== Theatre ===
In 2010 Clerc was cast as a soprano in Pecan Summer, the first opera written by an Indigenous Australian (Deborah Cheetham Fraillon) and involving an Indigenous cast, and will be an associate director for the 10th anniversary production.

She wrote The Fever and the Fret, which debuted at Yirra Yaakin in Perth, winning the 2017 Kate Challis Award. A production directed by Ursula Yovich was presented by the Ensemble Theatre in Sydney in November 2018.

=== Film and television ===
Jub's directorial debut in film was Storytime, a short thriller film released in 2007. It screened at Flickerfest International Short Film Festival in Sydney, the St Kilda Film Festival in Melbourne, and at the ImagineNATIVE Film and Media Arts Festival in Canada. The story was based on the Nyul Nyul/Yawuru stories she had heard in childhood of the spirit of a woman that lived in the mangroves and stole children, the Gooynbooyn woman.

Jub worked with producer Liz Kearney co-ordinating the Deadly Yarns initiative between ABC Television, ScreenWest, and the Film and Television Institute of Western Australia. She wrote and directed a documentary short film, Music Men, in the Deadly Yarns 4 series in 2009. At that time, she was a member of the 2 Deadly Casting & Artist Agency in Broome.

She has worked in a range of roles in television and film, including casting director, extras casting coordinator, dramaturge, and associate producer. Among others, she worked on Bran Nue Dae, and Jandamarra's War, Mad Bastards, Satellite Boy, The Circuit, Jasper Jones, and series 1 of Mystery Road. She also acted in Mad Bastards, Satellite Boy, Jasper Jones, and Mystery Road. As part of Screenwest's Feature Navigator program, Jub was assigned to work with director Rachel Perkins on all six episodes of Mystery Road.

Her feature directing debut was the short film Abbreviation, a segment of The Turning (2013). She also directed the short film Min Min Light, and episodes of the television series The Heights (2019; her first TV directing credit), Turn Up the Volume, and Total Control (series 3)

In July 2020, Clerc hosted the inaugural "Deadly Yarns" webinar for Australians in Film, interviewing Aaron Pedersen.

In September 2020, Clerc was selected as one of eight participants in a new writing and directing initiative organised by WA Indigenous production companies Pink Pepper and Ramu Productions, along with and New Zealand company Brown Sugar Apple Grunt, called the RED project. The project consisted of development workshops enabling each participant to write and direct a 10-minute short film, which would be part of a single anthology 80-minute feature film (working title RED) consisting of stories from a female Aboriginal perspective. The other participants were Kodie Bedford, Debbie Carmody, Kelli Cross, Karla Hart, Chantelle Murray, Ngaire Pigram, and Mitch Torres.

She directed the half-hour music documentary Struggling Songlines, produced by brothers and band members of The Struggling Kings from One Arm Point, Luke and Dan Riches, which premiered on NITV as part of Karla Grant Presents on 17 January 2022.

She is most noted for her 2022 debut feature film Sweet As, a coming-of-age film partly drawn from her own experiences. It is the first Western Australian feature film directed by an Indigenous Australian person. It was selected for several prestigious film festivals and won several Australian and international awards.

Since before 2018 and as of 2020 she was working with Truant Pictures to develop her 2007 short film Storytime into a supernatural thriller feature film, with the working title The Gooynbooyn (from "the Gooynbooyn woman", who stole children from the mangroves). She has been working with co-writer Steve Rodgers and producer Liz Kearney on the script.

Her latest project, the SBS/NITV comedy series Warm Props, wrapped filming in Broome, Western Australia in July 2024. Clerc was creator of the series, which she co-wrote and co-directed with Kimberly Benjamin. and premiered on NITV on 26 June 2025.

== Other activities ==
Clerc is a member of the Official Competition Jury for the Adelaide Film Festival in October 2025.

== Recognition and awards ==
- 2013: Nominated, AACTA Award for Best Direction at the 3rd AACTA Awards, as part of the ensemble directing The Turning
- 2014: Nominated, Best Screenplay in the Australian Film Critics Association Awards, as part of the ensemble directing The Turning
- 2017: Winner, Kate Challis Award, for the play The Fever and the Fret
- 2022: Winner, Innovation Award, Melbourne International Film Festival, for Sweet As
- 2022: Winner, NETPAC Award for best film from the Asia/Pacific region, Toronto International Film Festival, for best film from the Asia/Pacific region, for Sweet As
- 2022: Nominated, Asia Pacific Screen Award for Best Youth Film, for Sweet As
- 2023: Winner, Crystal Bear in the Generation Kplus section, 73rd Berlin International Film Festival, for Sweet As
- 2023: Nominated, Best Direction in a Debut Feature Film at the ADG Awards, for Sweet As
- 2024: Nominated, AACTA Award for Best Direction at the 13th AACTA Awards, for Sweet As

== Personal life ==
Clerc's family totem is the Jinda-Bidirbiddir (Willie wagtail). She is related to actors Mark Coles Smith and Ngaire Pigram, who were cast in Sweet As.

She has a daughter.
