= Kodie Bedford =

Australian screenwriter and filmmaker

Kodie Bedford is an Aboriginal Australian screenwriter, filmmaker and playwright from Western Australia. She is known for her play Cursed!, and work on several television series, in particular the 2021 comedy series All My Friends Are Racist.

== Early life and education ==
Bedford was born in Western Australia of the Djaru and Gija people on her father's side and Irish and English on her mother's. She grew in Geraldton in the Midwest region, and has strong family links in the East Kimberley region. An only child, she grew up with lots of cousins around her. She wanted to be a screenwriter from when she was a teenager, being a great fan of Buffy the Vampire Slayer, and credits storytelling with "saving her life". Her maternal grandmother, Valda Osborn, who loved Tolkien and Charles Dickens was also a great influence in her choice of writing as a career.

She earned a Bachelor of Communications at the University of Western Australia in 2007, taking courses in English, history, linguistics and communications. She moved to the East Kimberley afterwards to stay with her paternal grandmother there. It was a chance meeting with a video journalist from SBS at Halls Creek that led to her moving to Sydney to work in journalism.

She later (after 2013) gained a master's degree in creative writing from the University of Technology Sydney (UTS).

== Career ==
Bedford lived in Redfern, Sydney, while working as a cadet journalist for SBS Television in 2008, which included working on Living Black. She then worked for ABC Television as a researcher for Message Stick, a documentary series focusing on Aboriginal issues. She spent some time shadowing Sally Riley, as head of Indigenous at the ABC, working on Redfern Now in 2012 to 2013, which led to her going to UTS to earn her Master's in Creative Writing.

Since leaving the ABC in 2015 she has worked as a freelance writer. She was given her "big break" in being invited to join the writing team for Bunya Productions' 2018 TV series Mystery Road as a note-taker, at the suggestion of Penny Smallacombe, head of Indigenous at Screen Australia. After one of the writers left, producer Greer Simpkin and head writer Michaeley O'Brien invited her to join the writing team. Bedford is inspired by Rachel Perkins, and wants to write stories about Western Australia.

Her debut film as a director was the short horror film "Scout", which was released in 2019 as part of the horror anthology Dark Place.

In 2019, Bedford won a Balnaves Fellowship to develop her own play with Belvoir Theatre, Cursed!, which was inspired by her family gathering in Geraldton when her grandmother (Valda Osborn) was dying. The black comedy was staged in the 2020 season, directed by Jason Klarwein. It was praised by critics and went on to win an AWGIE Award.

In September 2020, Bedford was selected as one of eight participants in a new writing and directing initiative organised by WA Indigenous production companies Pink Pepper and Ramu Productions, along with and New Zealand company Brown Sugar Apple Grunt, called the RED project. The project consisted of development workshops enabling each participant to write and direct a 10-minute short film, which would be part of a single anthology 80-minute feature film (working title RED) consisting of stories from a female Aboriginal perspective. The other participants were Ngaire Pigram, Debbie Carmody, Kelli Cross, Karla Hart, Chantelle Murray, Jub Clerc, and Mitch Torres.

In 2021 she became the second writer on the ABC comedy series All My Friends Are Racist, created by Enoch Mailangi and directed by Bjorn Stewart. She was also script producer and co-executive producer on the series. She said that it "was one of those rare experiences where the creative team, crew, producers and executives were all on the same page". The five-part series premiered on ABC iview on 24 August 2021. It stars Davey Thompson, Tuuli Narkle, Leah Purcell, and Lisa Kay.

In 2021 Bedford was a writer on the television show Firebite.

In 2022 she worked on Troppo.

Bedford was a co-writer on the 2024 Netflix series Territory.

== Other roles ==
She is a co-founder of the Indigenous arts group, the Cope St Collective, and a founder member of the Australian Writers' Guild's Diversity and Inclusion Action Committee, along with Benjamin Law and others.

== Selected productions ==
=== Television ===
- Grace Beside Me (2018)
- Mystery Road (2018–)
- Squinters (2018–2019)
- Robbie Hood(2019)
- All My Friends Are Racist (2021)
- Firebite (2022)
- Troppo (2022)
- Summer Love (2022)
- RFDS (2023)
- Return to Paradise (2024)
- Territory (2024)

=== Film ===
- "Scout", a short film in the horror anthology Dark Place (2019)

=== Play ===
- Cursed! (2020)

== Recognition and awards ==
- 2019: Balnaves Fellowship
- 2021: Winner, AWGIE Awards, major award and Best Stage Play for Cursed!
- 2021: Nominee, Nick Enright Prize at the NSW Premier's Literary Awards, for Cursed!
- 2021: Nominee, NSW Multicultural Award, for Cursed!
- 2021: Winner, AACTA Award, Best Short Form Comedy, for All My Friends Are Racist

== Personal life ==
She lives in the London UK.
