= Starting From ... Now! =

Starting From…Now! is an Australian television drama series which began airing on SBS2 on 7 March 2016. Created by writer, director, producer, Julie Kalceff, it began as an online series for the first three seasons from 2014 before Seasons 4 and 5 were picked up for television. The series has over 42 million views and has been watched in 230 countries. Each season consists of six 10-minute episodes.

== Plot ==
The drama is described as a "lesbian love quadrangle" following the lives of Emily, Steph, Kristen and Darcy as they search for happiness and love and experience life in Sydney's inner west suburbs.

== Cast ==
=== Main ===
- Sarah de Possesse as Steph Fraser
- Rosie Lourde as Darcy Peters
- Lauren Orrell as Kristen Sheriden
- Bianca Bradey as Emily Rochford

=== Recurring ===
- Kylie Watson as Jackie

=== Guests ===
- Gretel Killeen as Kim
- Heather Mitchell as Elizabeth Peters

== Awards ==
Starting From Now has played on the global festival circuit, winning a number of awards including the Outstanding Diversity Award at Melbourne WebFest, 2017; the International Academy of Web Television Award of Recognition at Hollyweb Fest, 2017; the Audience Award at the Mardi Gras Film Festival, 2016; Outstanding Ensemble Cast in a Drama Series and Outstanding Writing in a Drama Series at LA WebFest, 2016; and Best Web Series at She Webfest, 2015. Starting From Now was a finalist at the Screen Producer Awards (Australia) in 2015 and 2017.

== See also ==
- Queer as Folk, British television series
- Queer as Folk, 2000 American television series
- Banana
- Cucumber
