= Wyrmwood =

- Theatrical film poster
- Directed by: Kiah Roache-Turner
- Written by: Kiah Roache-Turner; Tristan Roache-Turner
- Produced by: Tristan Roache-Turner
- Starring: Jay Gallagher; Bianca Bradey; Leon Burchill; Keith Agius; Berynn Schwerdt; Luke McKenzie
- Cinematography: Tim Nagle
- Edited by: Kiah Roache-Turner
- Music by: Michael Lira
- Production company: Guerilla Films
- Release dates: 19 September 2014 (Fantastic Fest); 12 February 2015
- Running time: 98 minutes
- Country: Australia
- Language: English
- Budget: $160,000
- Box office: $106,916

Wyrmwood (also known as Wyrmwood: Road of the Dead) is a 2014 Australian action-horror film directed by Kiah Roache-Turner and starring Jay Gallagher, Bianca Bradey, Leon Burchill, Keith Agius, Berynn Schwerdt and Luke McKenzie. The screenplay concerns a mechanic who finds himself faced with zombie hordes. Roache-Turner's directorial debut, it had its world premiere on 19 September 2014 at Fantastic Fest.

== Plot ==
Mechanic Barry lives in urban Australia with his wife Annie and daughter Meganne. Barry's sister, Brooke, is working on a photo shoot in her Bulla, Victoria studio. During a meteor shower, Brooke and her assistant are attacked by her model, who has suddenly become a zombie. She calls Barry and warns him to get out of the city. Meganne tells her parents there is a stranger in the house. Barry goes to investigate and ends up being attacked by a zombie. Barry, Annie, and Meganne don gas masks and fight their way to the family car. During their escape it becomes obvious that first Meganne, and finally Annie, have been infected despite their masks and become zombies. Barry is forced to kill them with a nail gun. He runs out of nails before he can kill himself.

Chalker, another survivor, finds Barry and knocks him unconscious when Barry attempts to kill himself with Chalker's gun. Barry asks Chalker to take him to Brooke's studio, unaware that a paramilitary group has taken her captive in the back of a truck that serves as a mobile lab for mad scientist Doc. While Doc experiments on the zombies and Brooke, Chalker's truck stops working. Chalker and Barry continue on foot, and Benny, another survivor, mistakenly kills Chalker. Benny, who previously had to kill his infected brother, and Barry team up and come upon a garage staffed by Frank and Kelly. Frank explains that all flammable liquids have become useless. However, the group accidentally discovers zombie breath and blood are flammable, and they devise a zombie-powered engine. During the attempt to winch the truck into the garage, Kelly is bitten in the nose and becomes infected. Kelly is then tied up and used as fuel.

Barry, Benny, and Frank discover zombies stop breathing flammable gas at night, enabling them to run faster. As they hole up in the truck overnight, Frank says he believes the zombies resulted from the meteor shower; as told in the Bible, a star called Wyrmwood has fallen, making part of the world bitter. After waking up from a nightmare, Barry catches a zombie on fire and accidentally sets the truck's compressor alight. While putting out the fire, Frank is bitten and asks Barry to shoot him; Barry does. The next day, Barry and Benny encounter paramilitaries in an electric-powered truck. The two drivers, after revealing that those with an A negative blood type are not affected by the disease, offer to lead Barry and Benny to Brooke, who they claim is in custody nearby. Meanwhile, Brooke learns she can now telepathically control zombies as a result of the experiments. With the help of several zombies, she kills Doc, escapes the truck, and joins Barry and Benny.

Barry's truck stalls after the soldiers accidentally kill the zombie powering it. While taking a pit stop for Brooke to fetch them a zombie, Benny is shot in the stomach. When they later pull over to take care of Benny, the soldiers catch up and subdue them. The soldiers reveal their plan is to decapitate Brooke and take her head to their commanding officer. Barry plans to kill them all in an explosion, but Benny instead sacrifices himself to turn into a zombie so Brooke can control him to overpower the soldiers. He kills two of the three soldiers, but the captain kills him and shoots Brooke in the chest. Barry challenges him to a fistfight but ends up shot when the captain retrieves his pistol. After shooting a zombie, the captain's face is splattered with zombie blood, and Barry ignites his head with the matches. Before Barry can shoot him, Brooke rises and commands a horde of zombies to eat the captain alive.

Barry and Brooke, back on the road, come across the lab truck again. They ask the soldiers what they have in the back of the truck; when they refuse to answer, Brooke commands a new group of zombies to attack them and tear them apart.

== Cast ==
- Jay Gallagher as Barry
- Bianca Bradey as Brooke
- Leon Burchill as Benny
- Luke McKenzie as The Captain
- Yure Covich as Chalker
- Catherine Terracini as Annie
- Keith Agius as Frank
- Meganne West as Meganne
- Berynn Schwerdt as The Doctor
- Cain Thompson as Kelly and McGaughlin
- Beth Aubrey as Charlotte
- Sheridan Harbridge as Sherri
- Damian Dyke as Thompson

== Release ==
The film premiered as Wyrmwood: Road of the Dead on 19 September 2014 as part of the Fantastic Fest. The limited theatre release was on 12 February 2015, It was originally supposed to have a one night only theatrical release in Australia, opening on 74 screens, but an overwhelming response and sold out sessions across the country saw its run being extended for weeks in some cinemas. It was followed by a Video on Demand release, over IFC Midnight on 13 February 2015.

== Reception ==
=== Box office ===
In Australia, the film opened at 76 cinemas on 12 February 2015 for limited time. The film earned US$66,362 during its opening weekend. It would go on to gross a total of US$106,916 domestically. Due to the budget being higher, the film was considered a flop.

=== Critical response ===
The film review website Metacritic surveyed 9 critics and assessed 5 reviews as positive, 3 as mixed, and 1 as negative. It gave a weighted average score of 54 out of 100, which it said indicated "mixed or average reviews". The similar website Rotten Tomatoes surveyed 38 critics and, categorizing the reviews as positive or negative, assessed 31 as positive and 7 as negative. Of the 38 reviews, it determined an average rating of 6.3 out of 10. It gave the film a score of 82% and summarized the critical consensus, "Rough around the edges but inspired at its core, Wyrmwood is a giddy variation on the zombie genre that will sate gore hounds' appetite for mayhem."

Twitch Film and The Hollywood Reporter both praised the film, and Twitch Film commented that the film's script is original. Variety also commented upon this element, as they enjoyed the character of Brooke "being injected with a chemical concoction that somehow gives her the ability to control the hungry hordes" and that "other nifty little touches, such as Frank and Barry's discovery that zombie blood can be used as a substitute for gasoline, Brooke's psychic powers bring something fresh to a horror subgenre that's received a particularly heavy flogging in recent years." Shock Till You Drop also gave a favorable review, stating that they found it to be an "impressive feature debut". IGN awarded it 7.5 out of 10, saying "Wyrmwood may tread familiar ground, but it's still a bloody good time."

Wyrmwood was reviewed in The West Australian: "with clear inspirations in Dawn of the Dead, The Evil Dead, Bad Taste, Re-Animator and ... Mad Max, from its Gothic-looking helmets, masks and weapons to its retro-fitted vehicles, Wyrmwood looks and plays a lot better than its $160,000 budget suggests."

== Sequel ==
In February 2015, a plan for a sequel was announced, with a potential return of the original actors Jay Gallagher, Bianca Bradey, Leon Burchill, Luke McKenzie, and Yure Covich. The release was proposed for early 2017, after the release of a “mental ghost" film, from Kiah & Tristan Roache-Turner.

The Roache-Turner brothers later announced that, due to the positive response to the film, their next project would in fact be a Wyrmwood sequel, initially planned in the form of a 10-episode television series. The team released a short teaser for the series on 19 May 2017, titled Wyrmwood – Chronicles of the Dead, featuring Gallagher and Bradey reprising their roles as Barry and Brooke. The brothers also worked on a sci-fi horror film, Nekrotronic, as they developed the series. However, despite favourable reviews and an award win at a major film festival, the TV short was never converted into a full-fledged television series like the brothers had hoped for.

In August 2020, funding was announced for a sequel titled Wyrmwood: Apocalypse. Set in a post-apocalyptic world, this film follows soldier Rhys on an arc of redemption as he turns against his evil bosses to join forces with a group of rebel survivors. Together they help save a little girl's sister from death at the hands of the military. The sequel was released in 2021.

== See also ==
- Cinema of Australia
