= Beast of War =

2025 Australian shark horror-thriller

- Directed by: Kiah Roache-Turner
- Screenplay by: Kiah Roache-Turner
- Produced by: Blake NorthField; Chris Brown
- Starring: Mark Coles Smith; Joel Nankervis; Sam Delich; Lee Tiger Halley; Maximillian Johnson
- Cinematography: Mark Wareham
- Edited by: Kiah Roache-Turner; Regg Skwarko
- Music by: Francois Tetaz
- Production companies: Bronte Pictures; Pictures in Paradise
- Distributed by: Cornerstone
- Release dates: August 2025 (Melbourne); October 10, 2025 (Australia)
- Running time: 87 minutes
- Country: Australia
- Language: English

Beast of War is a 2025 Australian shark horror-thriller film merging creature feature with war survival drama set during World War II directed by Kiah Roache-Turner and starring Mark Coles Smith, Joel Nankervis, Sam Delich, Lee Tiger Halley, Masa Yamaguchi, and Maximillian Johnson.

== Plot ==
A group of young soldiers, fresh out of boot camp, find themselves stranded on a raft in the middle of the ocean after their ship is sunk by the enemy and must battle for their lives against a giant hungry great white shark.

== Cast ==
- Mark Coles smith as Leo
- Joel Nankervis as Will
- Sam Delich as Des Kelly
- Maximillian Johnson as Stan
- Lee Tiger Halley as Teddy
- Sam Parsonson as Thompson
- Triston McKinnon as Bobby
- Aswan Reid as Archie
- Masa Yamaguchi as Commander Tetsuo Harada
- Lauren Grimson as Hazel
- Laura Brogan Browne as Susan
- Steve Le Marquand as Sergeant
- Jay Gallagher as Corporal 1
- John Sparke as Corporal 2
- Matthew Scully as Lone Soldier

== Production ==
Beast of War began filming on 1 August 2024 in South Australia. The filmmakers used a prosthetic shark, like Steven Spielberg had with Jaws. The film's director, Kiah Roache-Turner, revealed that their shark was female and nicknamed 'Shazza' by the crew.

The film came about when producer Blake Northfield messaged Kiah, telling him he had access to a water tank and asked him to write a screenplay for a horror film set on water.

The director claimed that the making of the shark flick was "the hardest thing" he had ever filmed, stating that lighting, stunt work and the construction of the 40-meter water tank was incredibly difficult.

== Release ==
Beast of War premiered worldwide at the 2025 Melbourne International Film Festival. The film was released worldwide on Blu-ray in November that year. It received a direct to streaming release and was released on Shudder in January 2026.

== Critical reception ==
The feature received mostly positive reviews. The Guardian gave it a four out of five star rating, stating "This smashingly well-paced and gung-ho film feels like it exists on the edge of consciousness – not quite reality, not entirely a nightmare, and certainly not a history lesson."

OutKick referred to the film as "the shark movie we've all been waiting for—no tornadoes, no CGI".

ScreenAnarchy claimed the shark flick was a "blend of genre thrills, historical drama, and social commentary" and said it "came with an unexpected emotional weight behind a premise that sounds like pure pulp". Kiah Roache-Turner also got praise for his directing skills, with Anarchy saying that "Roache-Turner remains visually ambitious and will be praised for his commitment to practical effects".

Bloody Disgusting said the film impressed with "slick practical effects and strong performances".

Digital Spy called the film a "clever and tense must see".
