= Firebite =

Australian streaming television drama series

- Genre: Drama; Supernatural; Fantasy
- Created by: Warwick Thornton; Brendan Fletcher
- Written by: Kodie Bedford; Brendan Fletcher; Devi Telfer; Josh Sambono; Warwick Thornton
- Directed by: Warwick Thornton; Tony Krawitz
- Starring: Rob Collins; Shantae Barnes-Cowan; Yael Stone; Callan Mulvey
- Country of origin: Australia
- Original language: English
- No. of seasons: 1
- No. of episodes: 8

Production
- Executive producers: Rachel Gardner; Emile Sherman; Iain Canning; Warwick Thornton; Brendan Fletcher
- Producers: Paul Ranford; Dena Curtis
- Cinematography: Warwick Thornton
- Editor: Mat Evans
- Production company: See-Saw Films

Original release
- Network: AMC+
- Release: 16 December 2021 – 3 February 2022

Firebite is an Australian supernatural drama television series featuring vampires created by Warwick Thornton and Brendan Fletcher, and co-directed by Thornton and Tony Krawitz. A co-production between See-Saw Films and AMC Studios, the series premiered on AMC+ on 16 December 2021 and ran for 8 episodes until 3 February 2022. It stars Rob Collins, Shantae Barnes-Cowan, Yael Stone, and Callan Mulvey.

== Premise ==
Set in a remote mining town in the middle of the South Australian desert, the series centres around two Indigenous Australian hunters, Tyson and adoptive daughter Shanika, who protect their home, Opal City, from vampires. Their lives are turned upside down when a former hunter from Tyson's past shows up informing them the last vampire king has arrived with plans that will shift the balance in their war against the vampires.

The series aims to tell the story of the colonisation of Australia from an Indigenous perspective, using vampires as metaphors for the use of smallpox. The 11 vampires which are brought by the British represent the 11 vials of smallpox carried by the First Fleet, and allegedly used as a biological weapon against the Indigenous peoples of Sydney Cove and surrounds.

== Cast ==
- Rob Collins as Tyson Walker. A former Blood Hunter, and Shanika's guardian. He uses Kangaroo Hunting as cover to hide hunting vampires. He acts immature when raising Shanika but is protective of her and keeps his community safe. He is skilled in using the Indigenous hooked boomerang in hunting vampires. His favorite song is "Black Boy" by Coloured Stone
- Shantae Barnes-Cowan as Shanika "Neeks". Tyson's partner and adoptive daughter. She is proud of her Indigenous roots and despises racism toward her and her people. Her Mum was taken when she was a child resulting in Tyson raising and training her. She loves Tyson but will speak her mind when she wishes to take the fight further with the vampires.
- Yael Stone as Eleona. A barmaid in Spud's bar. She has a fling with Tyson. She's revealed to be a vampire who left the Last King to live in peace. She was a mother before the King forced her to feed on her baby resulting in her hate for him and desire for his death.
- Callan Mulvey as The Last Vampire King. Last of the 11 original Vampire Lords who invaded Australia. He is cruel, sociopathic, intelligent, and ruthless. He killed Jalingbirri's team upon his arrival.
- Jai Koutrae as Spud. Owner of a bar Tyson frequents often. He is partners with Eleona and knows her secret letting her buy him off for access to his tunnels. He also deals in illegal dynamite sales.
- Kelton Pell as Jalingbirri. A veteran Blood Hunter and Tyson's mentor. He follows the traditional lore of hunting vampires and disapproves of Tyson's lifestyle. He chased after the Last King but was injured and saved by Tyson and Shanika from the tunnels after an ambush. He owns a modified Semi-trailer truck that houses his weapons and gear.
- Ngaire Pigram as Kitty Sinclair. Tyson's ex-girlfriend. He still harbors feelings but usually misses his chance. She works at the clinic and cares for Shanika's well-being. She's unaware of vampires and Tyson's past resulting in her believing he's irresponsible in raising Shanika.
- Tessa Rose as Aunty Maria. The leader of her community. She knows of vampires and tries to hide their existence to avoid panic in the community. She knows about Tyson's history and tries to get him to take his hunting seriously.
- Greg Tait as Smokey. A member of the community who lost all his siblings to the vampires. He wishes for revenge for their deaths. He holds Maria and Tyson responsible for hiding the truth.
- Natasha Wanganeen as Rona
- Tessa Rose as Aunty Maria
- Elaine Crombie as Coralee (2 episodes)
- Sam Dugmore as Lucas

== Episodes ==
No.	Title	Directed by	Written by	Original release date
1	"Pest Control"	Warwick Thornton	Warwick Thornton & Brendan Fletcher	16 December 2021
2	"The Last Bloodhunter"	Warwick Thornton	Brendan Fletcher	23 December 2021
3	"We Don't Go Down"	Warwick Thornton	Devi Telfer	30 December 2021
4	"Vampire Mythology Bulls**t"	Warwick Thornton	Warwick Thornton	6 January 2022
5	"I Wanna Go Home"	Tony Krawitz	Kodie Bedford	13 January 2022
6	"The Bastard King"	Tony Krawitz	Devi Telfer	20 January 2022
7	"Hero's Life"	Brendan Fletcher	Brendan Fletcher & Josh Sambono	27 January 2022
8	"The Rise of the Fallen"	Brendan Fletcher	Kodie Bedford & Brendan Fletcher	3 February 2022

== Production ==
=== Development ===
In June 2021 AMC Studios greenlit a co-production between AMC Studios and See-Saw Films of an 8-part series to be written and directed by Warwick Thornton and Brendan Fletcher. Other writers were Kodie Bedford, Devi Telfer, and Josh Sambono.

In August 2021, Tony Krawitz joined as a director and AMC+ announced that Yael Stone, Rob Collins, Callan Mulvey, and Shantae Barnes-Cowan would star in the film.

Paul Ranford and Dena Curtis co-produced the series. Executive producers were Rachel Gardner, Emile Sherman, Iain Canning, Warwick Thornton, and Brendan Fletcher. Simon Gillis of See-Saw Films and Kodie Bedford co-executive produced the series, while Libby Sharpe co-produced and Billy Bowring worked asas associate producer. Major funding came from the South Australian Film Corporation.

=== Filming ===
The series began filming in August 2021, and is filmed in the traditional Country of the Antakirinja Matu-Yankunytjatjara people of the Western Desert and Kaurna People of the Adelaide Plains in and around Adelaide, the regional opal mining town of Coober Pedy, and at the Adelaide Studios in South Australia. Coober Pedy has around 250,000 abandoned mine shafts, and executive producer Rachel Gardner said that the town "formed the basis for all design elements of Firebite, from the colour palette to tunnel studio sets. The actual landscape itself and the myriad of tunnels and caves elevated our production values exponentially".

=== Music ===
The score of Firebite was composed by Dan Luscombe and Gareth Liddiard of The Drones, and Jim White, drummer of The Dirty Three, joined them to perform the music. The soundtrack is notable for its use of Australian music only, including:

- "Black Boy", by Coloured Stone, a 1984 song which has particular resonance for Aboriginal people
- "Some Mutts", by Amyl and the Sniffers
- "Bow Down", by Barkaa
- "I Wish Australia Had Its Guns Again", by Private Function
- "Out There", by Tex Perkins and the Fat Rubber Band
- "Guillotine", by High Tension

== Release ==
On 7 November 2021, AMC released first look images and announced that the series was scheduled to be released 16 December 2021.

In Australia the series was released on both Apple TV and Amazon Prime Video via the AMC+ streaming bundle. It was broadcast as weekly episodes on free-to-air channel NITV from 6 July 2023 as well as the associated streaming service SBS on Demand.

== Reception ==
The review aggregator website Rotten Tomatoes reports an 86% approval rating with an average rating of 7.20/10, based on 7 reviews for the first season.
