= Interceptor (film) =

2022 film by Matthew Reilly

- Official promotional poster
- Directed by: Matthew Reilly
- Screenplay by: Matthew Reilly; Stuart Beattie
- Story by: Matthew Reilly
- Produced by: Michael Boughen; Matthew Street; Stuart Beattie
- Starring: Elsa Pataky; Luke Bracey
- Cinematography: Ross Emery
- Edited by: Rowan Maher
- Music by: Michael Lira
- Production companies: Ambience Entertainment; Foryor Entertainment
- Distributed by: Netflix
- Release date: June 3, 2022
- Running time: 97 minutes
- Countries: Australia; United States
- Language: English
- Budget: $15 million

Interceptor is a 2022 action thriller film directed by Matthew Reilly in his directorial debut, from a screenplay by Reilly and Stuart Beattie and a story by Reilly. An international co-production between Australia and the United States, the film stars Elsa Pataky and Luke Bracey. It follows a tough and reality-bruised army officer who finds herself in charge of a lone nuclear missile interceptor base in the middle of the Pacific Ocean after she is wrongfully drummed out of her dream job at the Pentagon.

The film began streaming on Netflix on June 3, 2022, and climbed to number one on the streamer's top 10 list with about 50 million hours viewed. It received mixed reviews from critics, and was nominated for Best Production Design at the 12th AACTA Awards.

== Plot ==
An American missile site with weapons intended to intercept nuclear missiles inbound to the United States located in Fort Greely, Alaska, is raided by unknown terrorists while 16 nuclear warheads are simultaneously seized from Russian territory. U.S. Army Captain J. J. Collins is assigned to another interceptor site, a remote platform in the middle of the Pacific Ocean as retaliation following a high-profile case of sexual misconduct by her superior. Working alongside Corporals Beaver Baker and Rahul Shah in the station's command center, she is part of America's last line of defense against hostile nuclear weapons following the hostile takeover of Fort Greely.

The station is infiltrated by operatives led by ex-military intelligence soldier Alexander Kessel who kill the base commander and personnel, sparing only Collins, Shah, and an unconscious Baker. The infiltrators attempt to enter the command center where the survivors are, planning to disarm the interceptor system and leave the U.S. open to attack by the sixteen stolen warheads. An operative penetrates the center through a floor hatch but is killed by Collins and Shah. Baker regains consciousness and reveals himself to be an inside man motivated by a big payday and xenophobia. Holding Collins and Shah at gunpoint, the remaining operatives enter and assume control. Kessel hijacks a live feed to stream his manifesto about the failures in the history of the United States, names sixteen American cities to be destroyed (which includes Los Angeles, Chicago, New York and Washington, D.C.), and instructs their terrorist faction to launch the attack. Collins breaks free of confinement and locks Kessel, Baker, and a henchman out of the command center, and kills two other henchmen.

Kessel provides a stream feed of Collins' father being tortured, but she refuses to surrender and her father is apparently killed when the transmission is cut. Unable to take control of the station, Kessel scuttles it to prevent it from defeating the nuclear strike. As the station begins to sink, Shah drops through the floor hatch to the ocean and manually re-engages the station's hatches and is killed by Baker. Collins hides while the terrorists disable the seemingly empty center. Baker ascends to the station's roof to find and eliminate her, and she stealthily dispatches the remaining henchman in the command center as Kessel flees. She carries a laptop to the roof to manually launch the interceptor missiles, and kills Baker in hand-to-hand combat.

Kessel finds Collins as she launches the interceptor missiles just in time to intercept the warheads. Collins subdues him just as a Russian submarine arrives to rendezvous with the terrorists. Two Russians emerge from the conning tower and shoot Kessel, killing him. The Russian captain salutes Collins before departing.

Collins recovers from her ordeal in a hospital, promoted by the U.S. president personally for her efforts. Her father, rescued by friends who had witnessed his plight on the live broadcast, comforts her.

== Cast ==
- Elsa Pataky as Captain Joanna Julia "J.J." Collins
- Luke Bracey as Alexander Kessel
- Aaron Glenane as Beaver Baker
- Mayen Mehta as Corporal Rahul Shah
- Rhys Muldoon as Lieutenant Colonel Clark Marshall
- Belinda Jombwe as Ensign Washington
- Marcus Johnson as General Dyson
- Colin Friels as Frank Collins
- Zoe Carides as President Wallace
- Janelle McMenamin as Fox News Anchor
- Nick Barker-Pendree as CNN News Anchor

In addition, Mark Dessaix plays the dismissive game theory strategist advising the President, while Chris Hemsworth appears in an uncredited cameo as the laid-back salesman at a big box consumer electronics store.

== Production ==
Reilly began writing the screenplay for Interceptor in 2017. The script's action took place predominantly on one set, as Reilly wanted to ensure that the film's budget would not go over $15 million. Beattie was so sold on the script that he contacted Reilly asking if he could rewrite it, to which the latter agreed. Beattie shared the script with producers, who were told that Reilly intended to serve as director. Reilly experienced some pushback on this, but was successful in maintaining his position as director.

On March 4, 2021, it was announced that Elsa Pataky and Luke Bracey would star in the film, with Beattie producing with Matthew Street and Michael Boughen for Ambience Entertainment. Pataky prepared for the role by training for up to five hours each day with the help of her husband, Chris Hemsworth, who served as an executive producer and also had an uncredited cameo role as a salesman for an electronics store.

Filming took place in New South Wales, Australia over a period of 33 days, beginning on March 29, 2021.

== Release ==
Interceptor was released globally on Netflix on 3 June 2022. Plans to release the film theatrically in Australia in 2021 were announced, but fell through. The film instead had a short theatrical release in Australia on 26 May 2022, the week before its worldwide Netflix release.

== Reception ==
=== Critical response ===
On the review aggregator website Rotten Tomatoes, 44% of 45 critics' reviews are positive, with an average rating of 4.7/10. The website's consensus reads: "Interceptor might spark a flicker of interest in viewers jonesing for a no-nonsense action thriller, but there's nothing here they haven't seen before." Metacritic, which uses a weighted average, assigned the film a score of 51 out of 100, based on 6 critics, indicating "mixed or average" reviews.

Paul Byrnes of The Sydney Morning Herald gave the film three-and-a-half stars out of five and wrote, "Parts of it are laughably silly, but that's intentional. It's not quite a satire, having some Serious Things to say, but mostly it's a romp." Nicolas Rapold of The New York Times stated that it "is clunky and barely coherent anytime there's not a fight scene." Benjamin Lee of The Guardian gave the film three stars out of five and called it "absurd yet entertaining."

=== Accolades ===
Year	Award	Category	Recipient	Result
2022	Screen Music Awards	Feature Film Score of The Year	Michael Lira	Nominated
2022	AACTA Awards	Best Production Design in Film	George Liddle	Nominated
