= Last Days of the Space Age =

2024 Australian television series

- Last Days of the Space Age
- Genre: Drama
- Created by: David Chidlow
- Written by: David Chidlow; Alice Addison; Dot West; Jeremy Nguyen; Alan Nguyen
- Directed by: Bharat Nalluri; Rachel Ward; Kriv Stenders
- Starring: Sam Delich; Jesse Spencer; Deborah Mailman; Iain Glen; Linh-Dan Pham; Thomas Weatherall; George Mason
- Country of origin: Australia
- Original language: English
- No. of episodes: 8

Production
- Executive producers: Emma Fitzsimons, Laura Waters, Chris Loveall, Stephanie Swedlove, Anna Dokoza, David Chidlow, Bharat Nalluri
- Producer: Christine Pham
- Production company: Princess Pictures

Original release
- Network: Disney+
- Release: 2 October 2024

Last Days of the Space Age is an Australian television drama series for Disney+, premiering on 2 October 2024.

== Synopsis ==
The series focuses on three families in Perth, Western Australia in 1979 as the American space station Skylab crash-lands just outside the city, which is gearing up to host the Miss Universe 1979 pageant.

== Cast ==
- Jesse Spencer as Tony Bisset
- Radha Mitchell as Judy Bissett
- Deborah Mailman as Eileen Wilberforce
- Linh-Dan Pham as Sandy Bui
- Iain Glen as Bob Foden
- George Mason as Mick Bissett
- Vico Thai as Liam
- Ines English as Svetlana
- Jacek Koman as Yvgeny
- Mackenzie Mazur
- Emily Grant
- Thomas Weatherall
- Aidan Du Chiem
- Luca Timpano Bilbatua
- Sam Delich
- Joseph Walker
- Vince Colosimo
- Josh Quong Tart as Gary Cullis
- Sam Delich as Wayne Doull

== Production ==
Christine Pham is the series producer, with Princess Pictures' Laura Waters and Emma Fitzsimons executive producing, alongside writer and creator David Chidlow, and director Bharat Nalluri, as well as Chris Loveall, Stephanie Swedlove, and Anna Dokoza.

Filming locations include Perth, Western Australia and Sydney and Wollongong, New South Wales. Principal photography began in July 2022.

== Broadcast ==
Last Days of the Space Age premiered on 2 October 2024 on Disney+.

== Reception ==
In the New York Times, Margaret Lyons described the show as "a dreamy, emotional drama", and commented that "Space Age has more wholesomeness in its veins than a drama-drama might, but it is thornier and more melancholic than a young-adult show". Lyons also noted, "The characters here find themselves pulled between 'why me?' and 'why not me?' Is everything falling apart, or is everything just getting started? Is a life of dashed dreams more painful than one of no dreams? Are you the keeper of the light or the last worshiper of a dethroned god?"

Reviewing for AV Club, Samantha Nelson wrote, "Last Days Of The Space Age builds slowly, weaving together so many characters and their stories that, at first, they can feel thin and disconnected. But everyone and everything comes together in episode three for a hilariously disastrous celebration of the 150th anniversary of Perth’s founding, demonstrating the strength of a show that’s simultaneously nostalgic while also clear eyed about the inequities of the past that are still relevant today." Nelson praised the performance of Iain Glen: "the show’s standout performance belongs to Judy’s dad Bob Foden (Game Of Thrones' Iain Glen), who’s quick to reassure his daughter while relentlessly judging her husband. He provides a connective tissue to the show’s sprawling ensemble, having a fling with Eileen that’s kept secret because she fears the wrath of her fierce Aboriginal activist daughter."

Luke Buckmaster in The Guardian praised the performance of Radha Mitchell, but criticised the structure of the series and felt it tried to include too many storylines. He thought that it was "best viewed with a kind of soap opera mentality" with "the characters’ various narrative threads connected tonally and geographically, like the communities of Ramsay Street and Summer Bay".

== See also ==
- List of Australian television series
