= Whale Shark Jack =

Australian family film

- Release poster
- Directed by: Miranda Edmonds; Khrob Edmonds
- Screenplay by: Kathryn Lefroy
- Produced by: Timothy White; Miranda Edmonds
- Starring: Abbie Cornish; Michael Dorman; Alyla Browne; Rachel Ward
- Production companies: Cottesloe Films; Southern Light Films; WSJ Productions
- Release date: 2 April 2026
- Running time: 85 minutes
- Country: Australia
- Language: English

Whale Shark Jack is an Australian family film starring Abbie Cornish, Michael Dorman and Alyla Browne, released on 2 April 2026 through Stan. It is a story about family, friendship, and the natural world as a young girl comes to terms with the loss of her father by embarking on a risky mission to save her best friend, a whale shark named Jack.

It was developed by a Western Australian creative team, including screenwriter and author Kathryn Lefroy and sibling directors Miranda Edmonds and Khrob Edmonds, in their feature directorial debut. Whale Shark Jack is set on and around the Ningaloo Reef in Western Australia.

== Premise ==
Sarah, aged 12, lives on a boat with her parents, who research whale sharks. Her only friend is a whale shark named Jack, who Sarah rescued when he was a pup. But following a tragic accident, Sarah and her mum move to the coastal town of Exmouth. Desperate to return to her old life, Sarah pegs all her hopes on Jack, certain that when his migration brings him back to Exmouth, mum will take her out on the boat again. But Jack fails to return, so Sarah embarks on a risky mission to find him.

== Cast ==
- Abbie Cornish as Nita
- Michael Dorman as Marcus
- Alyla Browne as Sarah
- Rachel Ward as Aunty Dot
- Ursula Yovich as Hazel
- Karen O'Leary as Rosie

== Production ==
The film was first announced in 2023, and marks the feature-length directorial debut of sister and brother directing team, Miranda and Khrob Edmonds. It is a co-commission between Stan and the Australian Children's Television Foundation (ACTF). It is written by Kathryn Lefroy, and has Timothy White and Miranda Edmonds as producers, with Georgia White and Estelle Buzzard as co-producers. Executive producers are Bernadette O'Mahony for ACTF, Cailah Scobie and Donna Chang for Stan, Kelvin Munro, and Malinda Wink. Deanne Weir, Olivia Humphrey, Khrob Edmonds, and Kathryn Lefroy serve as co-producers with Hazel Walgar an associate producer.

Abbie Cornish and Michael Dorman lead the cast as a married couple along with Alyla Browne as their daughter, as well as Rachel Ward.

Principal photography was initially delayed by over a year in 2024. However, it commenced in Western Australia in January 2025 and was completed in March 2025.

Kathryn Lefroy is set to publish a movie tie-in of Whale Shark Jack on 3 March 2026, through Penguin Books. Along with the book, an audiobook version will be released narrated by Ursula Yovich
