= Sam Delich =

Australian actor

- Born: Perth, Western Australia
- Education: Western Australian Academy of Performing Arts
- Occupation: Actor
- Years active: 2018–present
- Notable work: Spiderhead; Territory

Sam Delich is an Australian actor, known for his role as Rich Petrakis in Netflix series Territory.

== Early life ==
Delich was born and grew up in Perth, Western Australia, and is of Croatian and Dutch heritage. He studied acting at Western Australian Academy of Performing Arts (WAAPA), and was a top ten finalist for the prestigious Heath Ledger Scholarship in 2017.

== Career ==
Delich has appeared in the FX series Mr Inbetween as Yaniv, as well as appearing in the Royal Flying Doctors Service and Home and Away.

After appearing in the 2022 Netflix science fiction film Spiderhead, alongside Chris Hemsworth and Miles Teller, Delich was cast in the 2024 Disney+ production Last Days of the Space Age as antagonist Wayne Doull. The same year, he appeared as Rich Petrakis in the neo-western Netflix drama series Territory, for which he garnered critical acclaim.

Delich appeared in a lead role as antagonist Des Kelly in the upcoming Australian horror film Beast of War, as well as 2025 Australian/US television series Good Cop/Bad Cop, opposite Leighton Meester. In 2026, he joined the cast of Michaela Coel series First Day On Earth.

== Filmography ==
Key
†	Denotes works that have not yet been released

=== Film ===
Year	Title	Role	Notes
2018	The Marshes	Will	
2022	Spiderhead	Adam	
2022	Christmas Bloody Christmas	Robbie Reynolds	
2025	Beast of War	Des Kelly	

=== Television ===
Year	Title	Role	Notes
2018	Mr Inbetween	Yaniv	2 episodes
2019	Home and Away	Mark	1 episode
2021	RFDS	Will	4 episodes
2023	The PM's Daughter	Matt	5 episodes
2024	Last Days of the Space Age	Wayne Doull	5 episodes
2024	Territory	Rich Petrakis	6 episodes
2025	Good Cop/Bad Cop	Lucas Miller	

== Theatre ==
Year	Title	Role	Notes
2013	Hamlet	Laertes	WAAPA with Barking Gecko Theatre Company
2016	Dirty People	Fred / Ted	The Depot Theatre, Sydney with Jackrabbit Theatre & Doonbrae Productions
2017	Blackrock	Ricko	Seymour Centre, Sydney
