= Private Function =

Australian punk band

- Origin: Melbourne, Victoria, Australia
- Genre: Punk
- Years active: 2016–2026
- Labels: Marco Chan Records; Roolette Records; Damaged; Still On Top Records
- Past members: Chris Penney; Aidan McDonald; Milla Holland; Anthony Biancofiore; Lauren Hester; James Macleod; Joe Hansen; PJ Russo; Allan Stacey; Matt Fazio

Private Function were an Australian punk group, originally formed in Melbourne, Victoria in 2016. They released four studio albums, and were known for their larrikin humor, high-energy live performance style and unorthodox marketing gimmicks. On Christmas Day 2025, the group announced they were splitting up following a final run of performances in early 2026.

== History ==
Shortly after forming in 2016, the group released their debut EP Six Smokin' Songs, which featured cover artwork humourously depicting Bryan Curtis – the face of Australia's anti-smoking campaign – being "cured" by the band's music. In 2017 they released a track titled "I Wish Australia Had Its Guns Again", a satirical take on to US gun laws, which became a crowd favourite. The track was later used in Warwick Thornton's vampire TV series Firebite in 2021.

In November 2017, a second EP titled Rock In Roll was released on independent record label Roolette Records. On 16 August 2019, the group released their debut studio album titled, St. Anger with both the title and artwork replicating Metallica's album of the same name. In June 2020, the group announced the release of their second studio album Whose Line Is It Anyway? The album debuted at number 9 on the ARIA Charts. The release of the album included a limited-edition "Mystery Bag" vinyl variant, which purportedly contained small plastic bags of speed, pressed inside the clear records.

In July 2021, the group announced the compilation of their early EPs, titled The First Two Tapes On a 12". In October 2021, founding member Joe Hansen was removed from the group. Hansen was later replaced by Anthony Biancofiore, who was originally enlisted by the band to play Santa Claus at their Miracle on 69th Street Christmas show, which was held at the Forum in Melbourne that December. In 2022, Daddy Issues guitarist Lauren Hester, who had previously worked with the band after she directed the video for the track "Give War A Chance" for her Swinburne Film and Television assignment, was offered a permanent place in the band, replacing Allan Stacey.

In February 2023, the band announced the release of their third studio album, 370HSSV 0773H. It was released on 31 March 2023 via their own Still On Top Records. The album was proceeded by the single "I'm This Far Away (From Being the Worst Person You've Ever Met)" and "Seize and Destroy". The first 3000 vinyl copies of the album featured a scratchcard album cover, and was given a government exemption by Dini Soulio, then the South Australian Minister for Liquor and Gaming, to be sold in the state. The winning cover revealed three matching icons and its owner won a signed test pressing of the album, $2999 in cash and a photo of their face printed on all future pressings of the album. The winner of the scratch competition was found in June 2023 as a Queensland man named Mitch. The album debuted at number 11 on the ARIA Charts. The band also released a limited-edition "Gold" vinyl variant of the album filled with the band members' urine, limited to 50 copies.

In May 2025 the band released the album ¯\_(ツ)_/¯ which included a limited-edition "Goopy" scratch'n'sniff vinyl variant scented like Gwyneth Paltrow's vagina. On Christmas Day 2025, the band announced that they were breaking up in 2026. The band began their farewell tour at The Tote on 16 January 2026, supported by heavy metal bands Aardvark and Fly! and garage rock band Elvis II, before playing a run of shows in support of Viagra Boys. The band played their final show at Luliepalooza at Victoria Park on March 21, 2026. In April 2026, the band released their final recording, a 7" single entitled "Music Sucks (Fuck You)", through their own label Still On Top Records. A music video for the song was released in early May.

== Members ==
=== Final line-up ===
- Chris Penney – lead vocals, occasional bass (2016–2026)
- Milla Holland – bass, backing and occasional lead vocals (2016–2026)
- Aidan McDonald – drums, backing and occasional lead vocals (2016–2026)
- Anthony Biancofiore – lead guitar, backing vocals (2021–2026)
- Lauren Hester – rhythm guitar (2022–2026)
- James Macleod – keyboards, percussion, occasional bass and drums (2023–2026), rhythm guitar (2021–2022)

=== Former members ===
- Joe Hansen – lead guitar, backing vocals (2016–2021)
- Matt Fazio – rhythm guitar, keyboards (2016–2018)
- PJ Russo – rhythm guitar, backing vocals (2019–2021)
- Allan Stacey – rhythm guitar (2021)

== Discography ==
=== Studio albums ===
List of studio albums, with selected chart positions
Title	Album details	Peak chart positions
Title	Album details	AUS
St Anger	Released: 16 August 2019; Format: LP, cassette, digital; Label: Disdain (DR-1LP / DR-1CS)	—
Whose Line Is It Anyway?	Released: August 2020; Format: LP, cassette, CD, digital; Label: Damaged Record (DRC-002LP / DRC-002CS / DRC-002CD)	9
370HSSV 0773H	Released: 31 March 2023; Format: LP, digital; Label: Still On Top Records (ZEROZERO1)	11
¯\_(ツ)_/¯	Released: 23 May 2025; Format: LP, digital; Label: Still On Top	43

=== Live albums ===
List of live albums, with selected details
Title	Album details
Live On PBS 106.7 FM	Released: June 2020; Format: cassette; Label: Disdain (DR-1CS); Note: Limited to 200 copies

=== Compilation albums ===
List of compilation albums, with selected details
Title	Album details
The First Two Tapes On a 12"	Released: July 2021; Format: LP; Label: Marco Chan Records (MCR-005); Note: Compiling Six Smokin' Songs and Rock In Roll

=== Extended plays and singles ===
List of EPs and singles, with selected details
Title	Details
Six Smokin' Songs	Released: 2016; Format: cassette; Label: Private Function / Marco Chan (MCR-100)
Frantic	Released: March 2017 (erroneously stated as being released in 1994 on disk label); Format: 3.5" Floppy Disk; Label: Private Function / Marco Chan (MCR-002)
Rock in Roll	Released: November 2017; Format: cassette; Label: Roolette (RR003)
Six Smokin' Songs: Live on Bin Night	Released: July 2018; Format: cassette; Label: Marco Chan (MCR-003); Note: Limited to 50 copies
Six Smokin' Songs: Live at the 1997 Carols By Candlelight	Released: December 2021; Format: cassette; Label: Marco Chan (MCR-001); Note: Limited to 50 copies
Music Sucks (Fuck You) b/w Takin' The Edge Off	Released: April 2026; Format: 7"; Label: Still On Top Records (SOT-003); Note: Limited to 300 copies. Record label erroneously states the single was released in association with Albert Productions (AP-11037), recorded at Albert Studios, written and produced by Vanda & Young and copyright 1976.

== Awards and nominations ==
=== AIR Awards ===
The Australian Independent Record Awards (commonly known informally as AIR Awards) is an annual awards night to recognise, promote and celebrate the success of Australia's Independent Music sector.

Year	Nominee / work	Award	Result	Ref.
2024	370HSSV 0773H	Best Independent Punk Album or EP	Won	
2024	Slow Clap for Private Function 370HSSV 0773H	Independent Marketing Team of the Year	Nominated	
2026	¯\_(ツ)_/¯	Best Independent Punk Album or EP	Nominated	

=== ARIA Awards ===
The ARIA Music Awards is an annual awards ceremony that recognises excellence, innovation, and achievement across all genres of Australian music.

Year	Nominee / work	Award	Result	Ref.
2023	Harry Allen – Studio Balcony for Private Function – 370HSSV 0773H	Best Cover Art	Nominated	

=== National Live Music Awards ===
The National Live Music Awards (NLMAs) commenced in 2016 to recognise contributions to the live music industry in Australia.

Year	Nominee / work	Award	Result	Ref.
2023	Private Function	Best Punk/Hardcore Act	Nominated	
