= Wyrmwood: Apocalypse =

- Directed by: Kiah Roache-Turner
- Written by: Kiah Roache-Turner; Tristan Roache-Turner
- Produced by: Tristan Roache-Turner; Blake Northfield
- Starring: Luke McKenzie; Shantae Barnes-Cowan; Jake Ryan; Bianca Bradey; Jay Gallagher
- Cinematography: Tim Nagle
- Edited by: Brad Hurt; Kiah Roache-Turner
- Music by: Michael Lira
- Release dates: 2021 (festivals); 17 February 2022
- Running time: 88 minutes
- Country: Australia
- Language: English
- Box office: $263,293

Wyrmwood: Apocalypse is a 2021 Australian action-horror film directed by Kiah Roache-Turner and starring Luke McKenzie, Shantae Barnes-Cowan, Jake Ryan, Bianca Bradey and Jay Gallagher. It is a sequel to 2014's Wyrmwood.

== Cast ==
- Jay Gallagher as Barry
- Bianca Bradey as Brooke
- Luke McKenzie as Rhys
- Shantae Barnes-Cowan as Maxi
- Jake Ryan as The Colonel
- Tasia Zalar as Grace
- Nicholas Boshier as The Surgeon General
- David Collins as Keith Head Boom (uncredited)

== Release ==
Wyrmwood: Apocalypse was released theatrically in Australia on 17 February 2022. The film also opened in four other countries. It was released in United Arab Emirates and New Zealand on the same date as the domestic release. Later it was released in Colombia on 1 September 2022, and Russia on 5 October 2022.

== Reception ==
=== Box office ===
The film was released in 102 cinemas domestically in Australia. It grossed US$22,167 at opening weekend and total of US$47,704 at domestic box-office. It was released in total of 1065 theatres internationally. It grossed US$145,268 at opening weekend and grossed a total of US$215,589 at international box-office. In total it grossed US$263,293 at worldwide box office.

=== Critical response ===
The film review website Metacritic surveyed 6 critics and assessed 4 reviews as positive, 2 as mixed, and 0 as negative. It gave a weighted average score of 62 out of 100, which it said indicated "Generally favorable reviews". Rotten Tomatoes lists 23 critics with 20 assessed as fresh and 3 as rotten. It gave the film a score of 87%.

Lena Wilson of The New York Times gave it a positive review, writing that "'Wyrmwood: Apocalypse' is a must-see for zombie fans, thanks to a quick-witted script by the director, Kiah Roache-Turner, and his brother, Tristan Roache-Turner. Writing in The Los Angeles Times, Noel Murray called the film "equal parts exhausting and impressive — though thanks to the giddy fun the filmmakers appear to be having, it's mostly the latter."

Luke Buckmaster from The Guardian gave them film 3 stars, saying "The film is a perversely colourful, visually energetic and proudly splatterific sequel to its 2015 predecessor, a lean and mean midnight movie that, while stuffed with familiar genre elements, had a couple of rare or rare-ish distinguishing features."

Shown Romeo from The Weekend Australian gave the film 3 1/2 stars, writing "The result is an outlandish, humorous and entertaining schlocker that nods to Mad Max, Peter Jackson's 1987 debut Bad Taste and, even earlier, Soylent Green, starring Charlton Heston, from 1973".

== See also ==
- Cinema of Australia
