= Luke McKenzie (actor) =

Australian actor

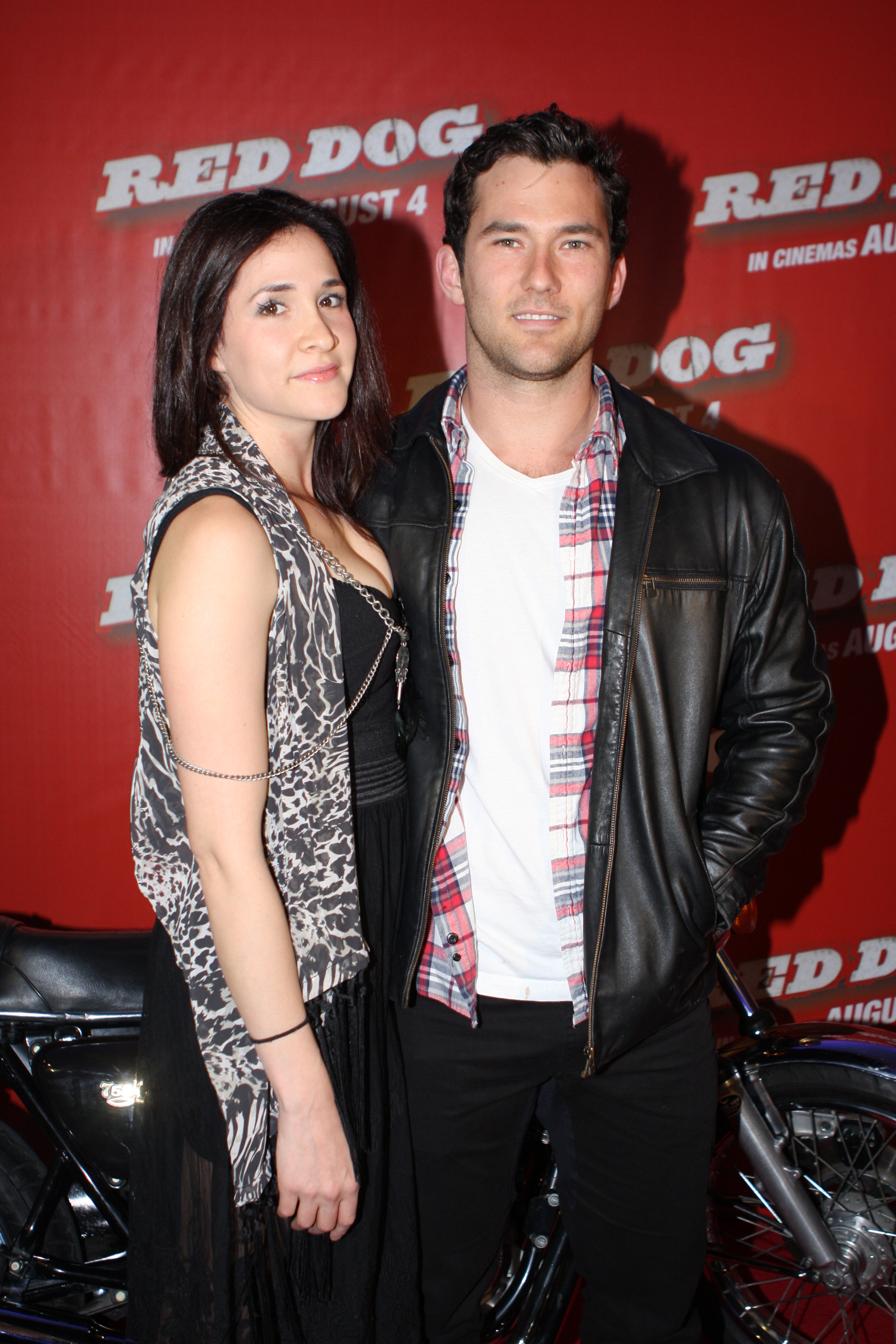
- Luke McKenzie (right)
- Occupation: Actor
- Years active: 2005–present
- Notable work: Wentworth; High Country

Luke McKenzie is an Australian actor. He featured as The Captain in Wyrmwood (2014), as Rhys (The Captain's brother) in its sequel Wyrmwood: Apocalypse (2021) and played Jeff in The Flip Side (2018). On television, he was a young Mick Gatto in Underbelly: A Tale of Two Cities (2009) and Lachie Gallagher in the third series of Rescue: Special Ops (2011).

In 2023, McKenzie was named as part of the extended cast for the Foxtel–Binge series High Country, he played the role of Brett Sweet.

== Filmography ==
=== Film ===
Year	Title	Role	Notes
2009	Crime Follows Punishment	Eddie Russell	
2011	Perfect Sense	Jenny's Son	
2014	Wyrmwood: Road of the Dead	The Captain	
2017	Butterfly Kisses	Snooker Hall kid	
2018	The Flip Side	Jeff	
2021	Wyrmwood: Apocalypse	Rhys	

=== Television ===
Year	Title	Role	Notes
2005–2006	HeadLand	Graham Quinn	2 episodes
2009	Rescue: Special Ops	Gary	Episode: "Rave"
2009	Underbelly	Young Mick Gatto	Episode: "Aussie Bob & Kiwi Terry"
2011	Rescue: Special Ops	Lachie Gallagher	Season 3 (9 episodes)
2013–2014	Winners & Losers	Shannon Taylor	Season 3 (10 episodes)
2014–2017	Wentworth	Nash Taylor	Seasons 2–5 (12 episodes)
2015	Sweatshop	Jackson Silver	Television film
2016	Con Man	Auditioner #1	Episode: "Gum Drop"
2016	Comedy Showroom	Handsome Handyman	Television film
2016	Jack Irish	Bill Irish	Episode #1.5
2017	Home and Away	Patrick Stanwood	Season 30 (18 episodes)
2017	Conan	Animal Expert / Jon Snow	Season 7 (2 episodes)
2023	Compulsory Entertainment	Senior Projects Manager	Episode: "Backslap"
2024	High Country	Brett Sweet	Season 1 (8 episodes)

=== Production ===
Year	Title	Role	Notes
2018	Home and Away	Writer	Season 31, episode 198
