= Nekrotronic =

- Film poster
- Directed by: Kiah Roache-Turner
- Written by: Kiah Roache-Turner; Tristan Roache-Turner
- Produced by: Andrew Mason; Troy Lum; Tristan Roache-Turner
- Starring: Ben O'Toole; Monica Bellucci; Caroline Ford; Tess Haubrich; Bob Savea; David Wenham
- Cinematography: Tim Nagle
- Edited by: Christine Cheung
- Music by: Michael Lira
- Production companies: Guerilla Films; Hopscotch Features
- Distributed by: Entertainment One
- Release date: September 8, 2018 (Toronto International Film Festival)
- Box office: $78,206

Nekrotronic (formerly Nekromancer) is a 2018 Australian comedy science-fiction horror film. It was co-written and directed by Kiah Roache-Turner, and stars Ben O'Toole and Monica Bellucci. It tells the story of demons that steal people's souls through smartphone apps, and the demon-hunters out to kill them.

It was intended to be a mashup of Ghostbusters, The Matrix, and The Exorcist. The story was inspired by the ICE of William Gibson's Neuromancer.

The film premiered at the 2018 Toronto International Film Festival. In September 2019, it had its Australian debut at the SciFi Film Festival in Sydney.

== Cast ==
- Ben O'Toole as Howard North
- Monica Bellucci as Finnegan
- Caroline Ford as Molly
- Tess Haubrich as Torquel
- Bob Savea as Rangi
- David Wenham as Luther
- Goran D. Kleut as Lurch

== Reception ==
On Rotten Tomatoes, the film holds a 39% approval rating based on 23 reviews, with an average rating of 5.3/10. The site's critical consensus reads, "Nekrotonic has plenty of oddball energy, but this horror-comedy hybrid mashes up ingredients without much of a clear idea of what to do with them." On Metacritic it has a score of 25% based on reviews from 4 critics, indicating "generally unfavorable reviews".

Dennis Harvey of Variety wrote: "Maximum energy meets zero originality to numbing effect in a horror-action-comedy mishmash." Stephen Dalton of The Hollywood Reporter wrote: "This bloodthirsty comic-book fantasy is let down by its infantile humor and derivative, incoherent plot."

=== Accolades ===
The film was nominated for Best Hair and Makeup at the 9th AACTA Awards.
