= Mark Coles Smith =

Australian actor and musician (born 1987)

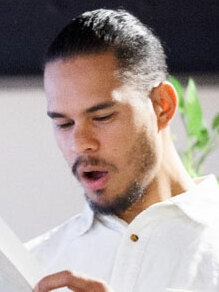
- Coles Smith in 2020
- Born: 1987 (age 38–39); Kalgoorlie, Western Australia
- Occupation: Actor
- Years active: 2003–present
- Known for: First Indigenous Australian actor nominated for a Gold Logie
- Notable work: Last Cab to Darwin; Pawno; Sweet As
- Television: Modern Family; Mystery Road: Origin; The Dog House Australia
- Awards: FCCA Award for Best Actor in a Supporting Role (2015); Helpmann Award for Best Male Actor in a Play (2017); AACTA Award for Best Actor in a Series (2022); AACTA International Award for Best Actor in a Series (2022)

Mark Coles Smith (born 1987), also known as Kalaji, is an Aboriginal Australian (Nyikina) actor of stage and screen, sound designer, field recordist, writer and composer. Smith is known for his roles in the feature films Last Cab to Darwin (2015), Picnic at Hanging Rock (2018), and Occupation: Rainfall (2020), as well as the television series Mystery Road: Origin (2022), and the Canadian series Hard Rock Medical (2013–18).

In 2023 he became the first Indigenous Australian actor to be nominated for a Gold Logie and won Best Actor in a Series in both the AACTA International Awards as well as the domestic AACTA Awards for his role in Mystery Road: Origin.

== Early life and education ==
Coles Smith was born in 1987 in Kalgoorlie, in Western Australia, and grew up on a cattle station on the Fitzroy River, two hours' drive east of Broome, in the Kimberley region of the state. Through his father’s family, he also has German, Polish, English and Scottish ancestry, while on his maternal side, he has Indonesian heritage alongside Nyikina roots. His grandfather was a pearl diver, and Coles Smith has said that his family were all very hardworking.

His parents separated when he was young, and he travelled around the country (including at Southern Cross University in Lismore, New South Wales; and in Brisbane, Perth, and Broome) with his mother, who was an academic who lectured in Indigenous mental health. He did not reconnect with his father, who ran art projects in remote communities, until he was around 10 or 11 years old. He felt an instant rapport and familiarity with his father, whom he described as possessing a kind of "German eccentricity".

He made his debut in the Network Ten children's TV show Ocean Star at the age of 14 after being taken to an open audition by his aunt.

In 2007, Coles Smith received the Wilin Centre for Indigenous Arts and Cultural Development's Yvonne Cohen Award. He earned a certificate from the Western Australian Academy of Performing Arts in Aboriginal Theatre, a course offered only once in Broome, in which eight students attended classes for six months. He later said that most of his training came from working with experienced actors, such as Lisa Flanagan.

== Career ==
Coles Smith has worked in acting, sound design, field recording, writing, and composing music.

=== Film and television ===
After filming his role in The Gods of Wheat Street in 2014, Coles Smith was cast in an episode of American sitcom Modern Family, playing a tour guide called Koora in an episode filmed in the Blue Mountains in New South Wales.

Coles Smith won critical acclaim for his performance as Tilly in Last Cab to Darwin, and was awarded with FCCA Award for Best Actor in a Supporting Role in 2015.

In 2021, Coles Smith was cast in Mystery Road: Origin, a prequel to the original two series. In the prequel, Coles Smith played a younger version of detective Jay Swan, a role originated by Aaron Pedersen.

Following Chris Brown's defection from Network 10 to the Seven Network in 2023, Coles Smith succeeded Brown as the narrator of The Dog House Australia.

Coles Smith features as narrator and interviewer in the documentary Keeping Hope, directed by Tyson Mowarin, which examines the high rates of suicide in Indigenous communities in the Kimberley. The film premiered at the Sydney Film Festival in June 2023, ahead of its airing on NITV and SBS Television. In the film, Coles Smith opens up about his own and his family's experiences with the impact of suicide of close friends and family members. Steve Dow of The Guardian gave the film four out of five stars.

In 2023, Coles Smith became the first Indigenous Australian actor ever to be nominated for a Gold Logie. He also received nominations for the Logie Award for Most Popular Actor and the industry-voted Logie Award for Most Outstanding Actor for his role on Mystery Road: Origin. He was one of three identities from ABC TV nominated for the Gold Logie, along with Leigh Sales and Shaun Micallef, with Coles Smith crediting the latter with helping him draw inspiration from the "Curiosity Cul-de-sac" parodies on Shaun Micallef's Mad as Hell for his role on Mystery Road: Origin. On 21 November 2024, it was announced that ABC had ordered a second series of Mystery Road: Origin, with Coles Smith to reprise the role of Jay Swan.

In 2025 Coles Smith narrated the ABC TV nature series "The Kimberley".

=== Stage acting ===
Coles Smith has performed in several stage plays. He gave his first stage performance as a child, Crabbing at High Tide, presented as part of the Perth International Arts Festival in 2005.

His 2016 performance in The Drover's Wife at the Belvoir Theatre in Sydney earned him the Helpmann Award for Best Male Actor in a Play in 2017.

Coles Smith played a leading role opposite Jack Charles in ILBIJERRI Theatre Company's Black Ties, first performed for the Sydney Festival in January 2020, then touring to Perth, Melbourne, and then Wellington and Auckland in New Zealand in February and March of that year.

=== Music ===
Coles Smith was the sound designer for the play Which Way Home at the Belvoir, produced by ILBIJERRI as part of the Sydney Festival and directed by Rachael Maza Long.

Under the stage name Kalaji (the Nyikina word for "whirlwind"), Coles Smith gave his first musical/multimedia performance, named "Night River", at the Yirramboi arts festival in Melbourne in 2019. The work explored Nyikina country and the Mardoowarra (aka Martuwarra, or Fitzroy River area).

In December 2021, under the name Kalaji, he released an electro-pop album of the same name. NME reviewer Cat Woods described the music as reminiscent of Icelandic band Sigur Rós, and overall "an atmospheric, expansive adventure in synths, instrumentals, field recordings, and treated vocals – and a meditation on themes of intergenerational wisdom and memory". Partly recorded on country and produced at Wawili Sound Studios in Broome, Coles Smith explores his relationship with Martuwarra (the Fitzroy River catchment area) and his Nyikina culture. It includes field recordings of natural sounds, and one of the ten tracks is named "Wandjina", the cloud and rain spirits of Aboriginal Australian mythology.

=== Narration (audio) ===
In 2020, Coles Smith narrated an extract from the Banjo Paterson's poem "The Man From Snowy River" on RN Breakfast.

Coles Smith narrated the audiobook of Tasmanian Aboriginal author Adam Thompson's short story collection, Born Into This (2021).

In 2023 he narrated and co-produced the epic book by Greg Campbell in a 31-year collaboration with senior Law-keeper Lulu (Nyikina elder, Paddy Roe) and the Goolarabooloo people, Total Reset: realigning with our timeless holistic blueprint for living.

== Recognition and awards ==
Year	Work	Award	Category	Result	Ref.
	Mark Coles Smith	Casting Guild of Australia	Sirius Award for New Talent of the Future	Won	
2007	Mark Coles Smith	Wilin Centre for Indigenous Arts and Cultural Development	Yvonne Cohen Award	Won	
2015	Last Cab to Darwin	FCCA Awards	Best Actor in a Supporting Role	Won	
2015	Last Cab to Darwin	AACTA Awards	Best Supporting Actor	Nominated	
2016	Pawno	AACTA Awards	Best Supporting Actor	Nominated	
2017	The Drover's Wife	Helpmann Awards	Best Male Actor in a Play	Won	
2022	Mystery Road: Origin	12th AACTA Awards	AACTA Award for Best Actor in a Series	Won	(Note: Ceremony took place in December 2022 in Sydney.)
2023	Mystery Road: Origin	12th AACTA International Awards	AACTA International Award for Best Actor in a Series	Won	(Note: Ceremony took place online in February 2023.)
2023	Mark Coles Smith	Logie Awards	Gold Logie	Nominated	

== Personal life ==
Coles Smith was deeply affected by the suicide of a close friend in 2011, when he was 23 years old, but kept his experience and feelings hidden until several weeks into the making of the documentary Keeping Hope ten years later.

In an appearance on Take 5, a show hosted by Zan Rowe on ABC Television, Coles Smith said that his grandmother was Ningali Lawford, then a dancer at Bangarra Dance Theatre in Sydney (later an actress).

Coles Smith moved to Melbourne in 2015. After many years of living on the east coast of Australia, he had returned to his hometown Broome by 2023.

== Filmography ==
=== Television ===
Year	Title	Role	Notes
2003	Ocean Star	'Spider' Webb	12 episodes
2005	Blue Heelers	Luke Parnell	Episode: "One Good Turn"
2007–2010	The Circuit	Billy Wallan	8 episodes
2009	Dirt Game	Willie	Episode: "Boab Dreaming"
2013	Miss Fisher's Murder Mysteries	Tom Derrimut	Episode: "Deadweight"
2013–2018	Hard Rock Medical	Gary Frazier	Main role; Canadian series
2014	Modern Family	Australian Guide	Episode: "Australia"; American series
2014	The Gods of Wheat Street	Tristan Freeburn	6 episodes
2014	Old School	Jason Dhurkay	8 episodes
2015	Airlock	Jonah Ashbrook	
2016	Hunters	Dylan Briggs	13 episodes; American series
2016	Please Like Me	Ricky	1 episode
2017	Doctor Doctor	Dan	2 episodes
2017–2023	Little J & Big Cuz	Uncle Mick (voice)	20 episodes
2018	Picnic at Hanging Rock	Tom	6 episodes
2018	Call of Duty: Black Ops 4	Specialist Crash (voice)	
2017–2020	Shaun Micallef's Mad as Hell	Various (including Bumfrey Moo)	14 episodes
2019	Lift	Guy	Web series
2019	KGB	William	5 episodes
2019	Les Norton	Jack 'Palings' Murphy	1 episode
2019	Zero-Point	Kyle Burton	Voice, 4 episodes
2020	Halifax: Retribution	Kip Lee	TV series; 7 episodes
2022	Savage River	Joel Thorpe	TV series; 6 episodes
2022, 2025	Mystery Road: Origin	Jay Swan	Series 3 main, succeeded Aaron Pedersen
2023	The Clearing	Wayne Dhurrkay	TV series
2023	Erotic Stories	Manny	Episode: "Imperfect Paw Paw"
2025	Apple Cider Vinegar	Justin Guthrie	TV series: 6 episodes

=== Film ===
Year	Title	Roles	Notes
2026	The Pout-Pout Fish	Hector	Voice
2025	Beast of War	Leo	
2025	We Bury the Dead	Riley	
2023	Combat Wombat: Back 2 Back	Reginald	
2023	Scarygirl	River Bandit (voice)	
2022	Sweet As	Ian	
2022	Akoni	Sammy	
2021	Jarli	Cuzzo	Short
2020	The Story of Lee Ping	Jack	Short
2020	Occupation: Rainfall	Captain Wessex	
2016	Miro	Miro	Short
2016	Messiah		Short
2015	Last Cab to Darwin	Tilly	FCCA Award for Best Supporting Actor; Nominated – AACTA Award for Best Actor in a Supporting Role; Won – AFCA Award for Best Actor in a Supporting Role
2015	Pawno	Pauly	Nominated – AACTA Award for Best Actor in a Supporting Role; Nominated – FCCA Award for Best Supporting Actor
2014	Wurinyan	Henry	Short
2013	Around The Block	Steve Wood	
2012	Ace of Spades	Christian	Short
2010	Beneath Hill 60	Billy Bacon	
2025	Beast of War	Leo	

=== Narrator/presenter ===
Year	TItle	Role	Notes
2019	Will Australia Ever Have a Black Prime Minister?	Presenter	
2020	Outback Ringer	Narrator	
2023	The Dog House Australia	Narrator	
2025	The Kimberley	Presenter/Narrator	

== Theatre ==
=== As actor ===
Year	TItle	Role	Notes	Ref.
2005	Crabbing at High Tide		Scented Gardens, Perth with Barking Gecko Theatre Company for Perth International Arts Festival	
2016	The Drover's Wife	Yadaka	Belvoir St Theatre, Sydney	
	Wulamanayuwi and Seven Pamanui		Darwin Festival	
	Jandamarra			
2018	Bliss	Joel / various roles	Malthouse Theatre, Melbourne, Belvoir St Theatre, Sydney	
2018	Bottomless	Jason	Fortyfivedownstairs, Melbourne	
2020	Black Ties	Kane	Sydney Festival, Sydney Town Hall, Studio Underground, Perth, ANZ Pavillion, Melbourne, Shed 6, Wellington, Waitākere Room, Auckland with Ilbijerri Theatre Company	

=== As crew ===
Year	TItle	Role	Notes	Ref.
2016	Blaaq Catt	Sound Designer	La Mama, Melbourne for Melbourne Fringe Festival	
2017	Which Way Home	Sound Designer	Belvoir Street Theatre, Sydney for Sydney Festival	
2019	Night River	Sound Designer	Yirramboi Festival, Melbourne	
