= Trouble in Paradise (TV series) =

- Genre: Travel documentary
- Narrated by: Liam Bartlett; Brooke Satchwell
- Country of origin: Australia
- Original language: English
- No. of seasons: 1
- No. of episodes: 6

Production
- Production location: International
- Running time: 60 minutes (including commercials)

Original release
- Network: Nine Network
- Release: 25 June 2009 – present

Trouble in Paradise is an Australian television documentary series on the Nine Network which first aired at 8:30 pm on Thursday, 25 June 2009. The series is narrated by journalist Liam Bartlett and actress Brooke Satchwell, and chronicles the harrowing experiences of Australians travelling on their holidays.

Trouble in Paradise features six edited stories from a similar British series, named My Holiday Hostage Hell (which is broadcast in Australia on the Crime & Investigation Network), and six originally-produced stories. Each episode consists of two stories, and six episodes have been produced.

The show was axed from the Nine Network's schedule after three of the six episodes had aired. It was eventually returned to the schedule of the Nine Network's digital multichannel, GEM, which broadcast the remaining three episodes commencing 16 March 2011.

== Episodes ==
#	Title	Airdate	Timeslot	Ratings (Note: Overall national viewers, numbers in brackets indicate nightly ratings position.)
Series 1 (2009; 2011)
1	"Murder in Mexico / Suicide Bomber in China"	25 June 2009	Thursday 8:30 pm – 9:30 pm	1,169,000 (7th)
2	"Kidnapped in Peru / Jailed In Thailand"	2 July 2009	Thursday 8:30 pm – 9:30 pm	1,094,000 (9th)
3	"Terror in Turkey / Kidnapped in Colombia"	9 July 2009	Thursday 8:30 pm – 9:30 pm	871,000 (14th)
4	"Attacked in Poland / Kidnapped by Warriors"	16 March 2011	Wednesday 8:30 pm – 9:30 pm	—
Scheduled upcoming episodes
5	"TBA"	23 March 2011	Wednesday 8:30 pm – 9:30 pm	—
6	"TBA"	30 March 2011	Wednesday 8:30 pm – 9:30 pm	—
Average series ratings (ongoing)				1,131,500
