= Grossmann Fantastic Film and Wine Festival =

Slovenian film festival

The Grossmann Fantastic Film and Wine Festival is a Slovenian film festival specialized in genre movies, with emphasis on horror and fantasy. The festival takes place every summer in the town of Ljutomer, in the Prlekija region of northeastern Slovenia. More recently, the festival has also taken place in Ormož.

Typically, a film star, such as an actor, director or writer will make a guest appearance at the festival, such as Christopher Lee, John McTiernan and others.

The 20th edition of festival took place from the 11th to the 15th of June in Ljutomer.

== History ==
Since 2006, the festival features a wine program. The accompanying program features live concerts, exhibitions, book presentations, and Zombie Walk. About Us, 2019 Since 2020, the festival takes place in Ljutomer and Ormož.

== Awards ==
Each year, the festival presents the following awards:

- Vicious Cat – Best Feature Film Award
- Slak's Vicious Cat – Best Short Film Award
- Melies d'Argent – nomination for Melies d'Or, the Best European Fantastic Short Film Award given by the European Fantastic Film Festivals Federation
- Noisy Cat – Best Music Documentary Award
- Vicious Cat Wine Champion – Best Wine Award
- Honorary Vicious Cat – Lifetime Achievement Award

Award winners are selected by international juries. The Festival also features a competitive film workshop (since 2008, it is the Roger Corman-inspired The Little Workshop of Horrors, where guerrilla movie crews have to shoot their films in two days and a night).

== Winners ==
Year	Vicious Cat	Melies d'Argent	Slak's Vicious Cat	Noisy Cat	Special Cat	Honorary Vicious Cat	Vicious Cat Wine Champion
2024	The Funeral (Cenaze; Orçun Behram)	The Fence (La valla, Sam Orti)	Fasten Your Belts (Mikhail Morskov, Vitaly Dudka)	Soundtrack to a Coup d'etat (Johan Grimonprez)		Slobodan Šijan	Traminer 2023, Vino Plemenič
2023	Megalomaniac (Karim Ouelhaj)	Sandwich Cat (David Fidalgo)	Perfect City: The Mother (Shengwei Zhou)	What You Could Not Visualise: Rema-Rema (Marco Porsia)		John McTiernan	Sauvignon Selection 2021, Plateis
2022	The Sadness (Ku bei, Rob Jabbaz)	Skinned (Ecorchée, Joachim Hérissé)	Part Forever (Alan Chung-An Ou)	Underground Inc. (Shaun Katz)		Robert Englund, Jack Sholder	Sauvignon 2021, Vina Herga
2021	Yummy (Lars Damoiseaux)	The Shepherd (Ilya Plyusnin)	Squish (Sprötch, Xavier Seron)	The Farewell (Odpotovanje, Petra Seliškar)		Gary Sherman, William Lustig	Revolution, Tourist Farm Hlebec
2020	The Lodge (Severin Fiala, Veronika Franz)	Slice of Life (Luka Hrgović, Dino Julius)	The Haunted Swordsman (Kevin McTurk)	Where Does a Body End? (Marco Porsia)			LeBlanc des Templiers, Tourist Farm Hlebec
2019	Tumbbad (Rahi Anil Barve, Adesh Prasad)	Hopes (Raúl Monge)	My First Time (Asaf Livni)	The Allins (Sami Saif)		Christina Lindberg, Sam Firstenberg	Muscat Otonel, Kaučič
2018	Errementari (Paul Urkijo Alijo)	The Box (Dušan Kastelic)	Wyrmwood: Chronicles of the Dead (Kiah Roache-Turner)	Bunch of Kunst - A Film about Sleaford Mods (Christine Franz)			Yellow Muscat, Kovačič
2017	Night of the Virgin (Roberto San Sebastián)	Under the Apple Tree (Erik van Schaaik)	Bon Appetit (Erenik Beqiri)	Spit'n'Split (Jérôme Vandewattyne)			Pinot Gris 2015, Vino Graben
2016	Scherzo Diabolico (Adrián García Bogliano)	Pearlies (Pascal Thiebaux, Gil Pinheiro)	The Disappearance of Willie Bingham (Matt Richards)	Rejects of the Second Generation – Following the Traces of Punk (Dunja Danial)		Jan Harlan	Ranfol, Kos Winery
2015	Ghoul (Petr Jákl)	Loose Ends (Stéphane Everaert)	Dead Hearts (Stephen W. Martin)	Morphine: Journey of Dreams (Mark Shuman)		Udo Kier	Revolution, Tourist Farm Hlebec
2014	Heavenly Shift (Márk Bodzsár)	24 Hours With Lucia (Miguel A. Carmona)	Underground (Marcos Cabotá)	The Right Man For Capitalism (Dušan Moravec)		Djordje Kadijević	Šipon 2012, Kos Winery
2013	Vanishing Waves (Kristina Buožyte)	The Tale of the Wall Habitants (Andrej Boka)	Antoine and the Heroes (Patrick Bagot)	How We Entered Europe: SexA Case (Ines Pletikos)		Franco Nero, Enzo G. Castellari	Yellow Muscat Illuminati 2012, Tourist Farm Hlebec
2012	Sleep Tight (Jaume Balagueró), Inbred (Alex Chandon)	Legend (Pau Teixidor)	The Captured Bird (Jovanka Vuckovic)	Fanzines from Mars (Siniša Dugonjić)		Goran Marković	Rhine Riesling selection 2009, PRA-VinO Čurin-Prapotnik
2011	The Last Circus (Alex de la Iglesia)	A Day in the Country (Lucas Vossoughi)	Attack of the Giant Brain Sucker Monster from Outer Space (Guillaume Rieu)	6 ft Hick: Notes from the Underground (Marty Moynihan)	Carlos Areces (Vicious Best Actor)	Christopher Lee, Menahem Golan	Chardonnay Brand selection 2009, KZ Metlika
2010	The Life and Death of a Porno Gang (Mladen Djordjević)		Fearful John (Daniel Romero)	Until the Light Takes Us (Aaron Aites, Audrey Ewell)		Jose Mojica Marins	Šipon 2009, Jeruzalem Ormož
2009	Eden Lake (James Watkins)		Deadspiel (Jay Molloy)	Vlada (Rudi Uran)	Jörg Buttgereit (Necro Cat)	Ruggero Deodato	Pinot Gris 2008, Jeruzalem Ormož
2008	The Living and the Dead (Kristijan Milić)		Kiss of Death (Kristijan Vrtačnik)	LP film Pankrti: Dolgcajt (Igor Zupe)	Brian Yuzna (Re-AnimaCat)	Roger Corman	Rhine Riesling 2007, Dveri Pax
2007	Cold Prey (Roar Uthaug)		Rockets (Vladimir Mančić)		Lloyd Kaufman (Troma's Cat)	Slobodan Šijan	Šipon 2007, Tourist Farm Hlebec
2006	Sheitan's Warrior (Stevan Filipović)		Sandwich (Tomaž Gorkič)			Krsto Papić	Sauvignon 2005, Vino Kupljen - Jeruzalem
2005			Bad Mother (Blaž Slana)				

== See also ==
- List of fantastic and horror film festivals
