= 8th AACTA Awards =

Australian film and television awards ceremony

- Date: 3 and 5 December 2018
- Location: The Star, Sydney, New South Wales, Australia
- Hosted by: Stephen Curry

Highlights
- Most awards: Sweet Country
- Best Film: Sweet Country
- Best Drama Series: Mystery Road
- Best Comedy Series: The Letdown

Television/radio coverage
- Network: Seven Network

The 8th Australian Academy of Cinema and Television Arts Awards (generally known as the AACTA Awards) is an awards ceremony to celebrate Australian films of 2018. The industry awards were presented on 3 December 2018, with the main awards following on 5 December. The main ceremony was televised on Seven Network.

== Feature film ==
Best Film: Sweet Country – David Jowsey, Greer Simpkin; Boy Erased – Joel Edgerton, Steve Golin, Kerry Kohansky Roberts; Breath – Simon Baker, Jamie Hilton, Mark Johnson; Cargo – Russell Ackerman, Kristina Ceyton, Samantha Jennings, Mark Patterson; Ladies in Black – Sue Milliken, Allanah Zitserman	Best Direction: Warwick Thornton – Sweet Country; Joel Edgerton – Boy Erased; Simon Baker – Breath; Bruce Beresford – Ladies in Black
Best Original Screenplay: Steven McGregor, David Tranter – Sweet Country; Matt Nable – 1%; Jaime Browne – Brothers' Nest; Leigh Whannell – Upgrade	Best Adapted Screenplay: Joel Edgerton – Boy Erased, based on the book Boy Erased: A Memoir by Garrard Conley; Simon Baker, Gerard Lee, Tim Winton – Breath, based on the novel Breath by Tim Winton; Yolanda Ramke – Cargo, based on the short film of the same name by Ben Howling, Yolanda Ramke; Bruce Beresford, Sue Milliken – Ladies in Black, based on the novel The Women in Black by Madeleine St John
Best Lead Actor: Hamilton Morris as Sam Kelly – Sweet Country; Ryan Corr as Vice President Paddo – 1%; Lucas Hedges as Jared Eamons – Boy Erased; Damian Hill as Jimmy – West of Sunshine; Daniel Monks as Olly – Pulse	Best Lead Actress: Angourie Rice as Lisa – Ladies in Black; Abbey Lee as Katrina – 1%; Rooney Mara as Mary Magdalene – Mary Magdalene; Kate Mulvany as Angie Barlow – The Merger; Julia Ormond as Magda – Ladies in Black
Best Supporting Actor: Simon Baker as Sando – Breath; Fayssal Bazzi as Sayyid – The Merger; Russell Crowe as Marshall Eamons – Boy Erased; Joel Edgerton as Victor Sykes – Boy Erased; Josh McConville as Skink – 1%	Best Supporting Actress: Nicole Kidman as Nancy Eamons – Boy Erased; Elizabeth Debicki as Eva – Breath; Natassia Gorey-Furber as Lizzie Kelly – Sweet Country; Noni Hazlehurst as Miss Cartwright – Ladies in Black; Simone Kessell as Hayley – 1%
Best Cinematography: Warwick Thornton – Sweet Country; Marden Dean, Rick Rifici – Breath; Peter James – Ladies in Black; Thom Neal – West of Sunshine	Best Editing: Nick Meyers – Sweet Country; Dany Cooper – Breath; Mark Warner – Ladies in Black; Andy Canny – Upgrade
Best Original Music Score: Christopher Gordon – Ladies in Black; Hildur Guðnadóttir, Jóhann Jóhannsson – Mary Magdalene; Dominic Lewis – Peter Rabbit; Jed Palmer – Upgrade	Best Sound: Jed Dodge, Trevor Hope, Robert Mackenzie, Tara Webb – Breath; Liam Egan, Leah Katz, Des Kenneally, Robert Sullivan – Cargo; Sam Gain-Emery, Thom Kellar, Will Sheridan, David Tranter – Sweet Country; Will Files, P.K. Hooker, Andrew Ramage – Upgrade
Best Production Design: Roger Ford, Lisa Thompson – Peter Rabbit; Jo Ford – Cargo; Felicity Abbott, Katie Sharrock – Upgrade; Vanessa Cerne, Matthew Putland – Winchester	Best Costume Design: Wendy Cork – Ladies in Black; Jacqueline Durran – Mary Magdalene; Heather Wallace – Sweet Country; Wendy Cork – Winchester
Best Hair and Makeup: Ladies in Black — Jen Lamphee, Anna Gray, Beth Halsted; Cargo — Larry Van Duynhoven, Beverley Freeman, Helen Magelaki; Upgrade — Chiara Tripodi, Larry Van Duynhoven; Winchester — Tess Natoli, Steve Boyle	Best Casting: Riot — Allison Meadows; Breath — Nikki Barrett; Friday On My Mind — Leigh Pickford; Sweet Country — Anousha Zarkesh
Best Visual Effects or Animation: Peter Rabbit — Will Reichelt, Simon Whiteley, Simon Pickard, Peter Stubbs, Jason Bath, Brian Lynch, Matt Middleton; Black Panther — Brendan Seals, Michael Perdew, Andrew Zink, Raphael A. Pimentel; The Lego Ninjago Movie — Fiona Chilton, Kim Taylor, Simon Whiteley, Matt Everitt, Gregory Jowle; Upgrade — Jonathan Dearing, Matt Daly, Angelo Sahin, Kate Bernauer, Aevar Bjarnason

Best Indie Film
- Jirga – Benjamin Gilmour (dir.), John Maynard
  - Brothers' Nest – Clayton Jacobson (dir.), Jason Byrne
  - The Second – Mairi Cameron (dir.), Stephen Lance, Leanne Tonkes
  - Strange Colours – Alena Lodkina (dir.), Kate Laurie, Isaac Wall
  - West of Sunshine – Jason Raftopoulos (dir.), Alexandros Ouzas

== Television ==
Best Drama Series: Mystery Road – David Jowsey, Greer Simpkin; Jack Irish – Ian Collie, Matt Cameron, Andrew Knight; Mr Inbetween – Michele Bennett; Rake – Ian Collie, Peter Duncan, Richard Roxburgh; Wentworth – Jo Porter, Pino Amenta	Best Telefeature, Mini Series or Short Run Series: Riot – Joanna Werner, Louise Smith; Dead Lucky – Ellie Beaumont, Drew Proffitt, Diane Haddon; Friday On My Mind – David Taylor, David Maher, Diane Haddon, Christopher Lee; Picnic at Hanging Rock – Jo Porter, Brett Popplewell; Safe Harbour – Stephen Corvini, Debbie Lee
Best Comedy Series: The Letdown – Julian Morrow, Sarah Scheller, Alison Bell; Black Comedy – Kath Shelper, Mark O'Toole; Nanette – Kevin Whyte, Kathleen McCarthy, Frank Bruzzese; Rosehaven – Andrew Walker, Kevin Whyte, Celia Pacquola, Luke McGregor; True Story with Hamish & Andy – Tim Bartley, Andy Lee, Ryan Shelton, Andrew Walker	Best Entertainment Program: The Weekly with Charlie Pickering – Ellie Beaumont, Drew Proffitt, Diane Haddon; Gogglebox Australia – David McDonald, Kerrie Kerr; Hard Quiz – Chris Walker, Kevin Whyte, Charlie Pickering, Tom Gleeson; Julia Zemiro's Home Delivery – Damian Davis, Polly Connolly, Nick Murray, Julia Zemiro; Little Big Shots – Karen Greene
Best Lifestyle Program: Selling Houses Australia – Geoff Fitzpatrick, Duane Hatherly, Sonia Harding; Better Homes and Gardens – Russell Palmer, Rani Eaton; The Checkout – Julian Morrow, Nick Murray, Rebecca Annetts; Food Safari Water – Toufic Charabati, Georgina Neal, Jacinta Dunn; The Great Australian Bake Off – Nicole Rogers, David Briegel-Jones	Best Reality Series: Australian Survivor: Champions vs. Contenders – Amelia Fisk, Georgina Hinds, Adam Fergusson; MasterChef Australia – Marty Benson, Tim Toni, Adam Fergusson; My Kitchen Rules – Chris Walker, Kevin Whyte, Charlie Pickering, Tom Gleeson; The Real Housewives of Melbourne – Kylie Washington, Lisa Potasz, Natalie Brosnan, Pip Rubira; The Single Wives – Paul Franklin, Chris Culvenor
Best Children's Series: The Bureau of Magical Things – Jonathan M. Shiff, Stuart Wood; Grace Beside Me – Lois Randall, Dena Curtis; Guess How Much I Love You – Suzanne Ryan; My Year 7 Life – Laura Waters, Emma Fitzsimons, Karla Burt; The New Legends of Monkey – Rachel Gardner, Jamie Laurenson, Hakan Kousetta, Emile Sherman, Iain Canning, Robin Scholes	Best Screenplay in Television: Safe Harbour - Episode 1 – Belinda Chayko; Mr Inbetween - Episode 2: Unicorns Know Everybody's Name – Scott Ryan; Mystery Road - Episode 5: The Waterhole – Timothy Lee, Kodie Bedford, Steven McGregor, Michaeley O’Brien; Riot – Greg Waters
Best Lead Actor – Drama: Damon Herriman – Riot; Aaron Pedersen – Mystery Road; Richard Roxburgh – Rake; Scott Ryan – Mr Inbetween; Hazem Shammas – Safe Harbour	Best Lead Actress – Drama: Kate Box – Riot; Tina Bursill – Doctor Doctor; Judy Davis – Mystery Road; Leah Purcell – Wentworth; Leeanna Walsman – Safe Harbour
Best Guest or Supporting Actor – Drama: Wayne Blair – Mystery Road; Damien Garvey – Rake; Xavier Samuel – Riot; Dan Wyllie – Romper Stomper; Ashley Zukerman – Friday On My Mind	Best Guest or Supporting Actress – Drama: Deborah Mailman – Mystery Road; Caroline Brazier – Rake; Nicole Chamoun – Safe Harbour; Celia Ireland – Wentworth; Tasma Walton – Mystery Road
Best Television Direction: Glendyn Ivin – Safe Harbour - Episode 1; Nash Edgerton – Mr Inbetween - Episode 2: Unicorns Know Everybody's Name; Rachel Perkins – Mystery Road - Episode 4: Silence; Jeffrey Walker – Riot	Best Non-Fiction Television Direction: Bruce Permezel – Hawke: The Larrikin and the Leader - Episode 1: The Apprenticeship; Larissa Behrendt – After The Apology; David Batty – Black As; Aaron Smith, Kirk Docker – You Can't Ask That - Episode 1: Survivors of Sexual Assault
Best Cinematography in Television: Garry Phillips – Picnic at Hanging Rock - Episode 1; Henry Pierce – A Place to Call Home - Episode 1: For Better or Worse; Mark Wareham – Mystery Road - Episode 4: Silence; Sam Chiplin – Safe Harbour - Episode 1	Best Editing in Television: Deborah Peart – Mystery Road - Episode 5: The Waterhole; Mark Perry – Friday On My Mind - Part 1; Geoff Hitchins – Picnic at Hanging Rock - Episode 1; Geoffrey Lamb – Riot
Best Sound in Television: Greg Burgmann, Frank Lipson, Andrew McGrath – Romper Stomper - Episode 3: Poetry; Luke Mynott, Wes Chew, Ben Osmo, Cihan Saral – Friday On My Mind - Part 1; Andrew Neil, Paul Pirola, Frank Lipson, Ann Aucote – Picnic at Hanging Rock - Episode 1; Paul 'Salty' Brincat, Paul Pirola, Andrew Neil – Safe Harbour - Episode 1	Best Original Music Score in Television: Antony Partos, Matteo Zingales – Mystery Road - Episode 4: Silence; Cezary Skubiszewski – Picnic at Hanging Rock - Episode 1; David Hirschfelder – Riot; Richard Pike – Romper Stomper
Best Production Design in Television: Jo Ford – Picnic at Hanging Rock - Episode 1; Fiona Donovan – A Place to Call Home - Episode 1: For Better or Worse; Tim Ferrier, Nancy Dentice – Friday On My Mind - Part 1; Pete Baxter – Riot	Best Costume Design in Television: Edie Kurzer – Picnic at Hanging Rock - Episode 1; Lisa Meagher – A Place to Call Home - Episode 1: For Better or Worse; Liz McGregor – The New Legends of Monkey - Episode 1; Xanthe Heubel – Riot
Best Performance in a Television Comedy: Hannah Gadsby – Nanette; Alison Bell – The Letdown; Wayne Hope – Back in Very Small Business; Robyn Nevin – Back in Very Small Business; Celia Pacquola – Rosehaven	Subscription Television Award for Best New Talent: Scott Ryan – Mr Inbetween; Inez Currò – Picnic at Hanging Rock; Markella Kavenagh – Romper Stomper; Nick Riewoldt – AFL 360; Chika Yasumura – Mr Inbetween
Subscription Television Award for Best Male Presenter: Andrew Winter – Love It or List It Australia, Selling Houses Australia; Matty Johns – Sunday Night with Matty Johns, The Late Show with Matty Johns; Matt Moran – The Great Australian Bake Off; Neale Whitaker – Love It or List It Australia; Matt Wright – Outback Wrangler	Subscription Television Award for Best Female Presenter: Shaynna Blaze – Selling Houses Australia; Mel Buttle – The Great Australian Bake Off; Margaret Pomeranz – Screen; Yvonne Sampson – League Life, Big League Wrap, Thursday Night Footy, Super Saturday; Ashleigh Wells – Hanging with Weekend Hangout
Subscription Television Award for Best Live Event Production: Sky News Leadership Spill – David Speers, Kieran Gilbert, Laura Jayes; Bathurst 2017 – James Harrison; CMC Music Awards 2018 – Duane Hatherly; Jeff Horn vs Gary Corcoran: WBO Welterweight Title Fight – Matt Weiss	Subscription Television Award for Best Sports Presentation: Finals Footy on Fox: Richmond vs Collingwood – Ben Roberts, Zach Larkins, Leigh Carlson, Michael Neill; AFL 360 – Tim Hodges, Tom Dullard, Sam Daddo; League Life – Michael Sullivan; Sunday Night with Matty Johns – Ben Churchill

== Documentary ==
Best Feature Length Documentary: Gurrumul – Paul Damien Williams, Shannon Swan; Ghosthunter – Ben Lawrence, Rebecca Bennett; Jill Bilcock: Dancing The Invisible – Axel Grigor, Faramarz K-Rahber; Mountain – Jennifer Peedom, Jo-anne McGowan; Working Class Boy – Mark Joffe, Matt Campbell, Andrew Farrell, Michael Cordell	Best Documentary Television Program: Employable Me – Karina Holden, Sue Clothier, Jenni Wilks; After the Apology – Michaela Perske (writer/producer), Larissa Behrendt (director); Hawke: The Larrikin and the Leader – Laurie Critchley, Geraldine McKenna, Jo Cadman; The Queen & Zak Grieve – Nial Fulton, Ivan O'Mahoney, Dan Box; You Can't Ask That – Kirk Docker, Aaron Smith, Lou Porter
Best Editing in a Documentary: Karen Johnson – Ghosthunter; Shannon Swan, Ken Sallows – Gurrumul; Johanna Scott – Have You Seen The Listers?; Christian Gazal, Scott Gray – Mountain	Best Cinematography in a Documentary: Renan Ozturk – Mountain; Hugh Miller – Ghosthunter; Dan Maxwell, Katie Milwright, Matt Toll, Gavin Head – Gurrumul; Michael Latham – Island of the Hungry Ghosts
Best Original Music Score in a Documentary: Richard Tognetti – Mountain; Caitlin Yeo – After The Apology; Rafael May – Ghosthunter; Geoffrey Gurrumul Yunupingu, Erkki Veltheim, Michael Hohnen, Matthew Cunliffe – Gurrumul	Best Sound in a Documentary: David White, Robert Mackenzie – Mountain; Pip Atherstone-Reid, Simon Rosenberg – Gurrumul; Leo Dolgan – Island of the Hungry Ghosts; Greg Fitzgerald, Mario Gabrieli, Lucinda Clutterbuck, Daniel Scharf – Midnight Oil: 1984

== Short form ==
Best Short Fiction Film: All These Creatures – Charles Williams, Elise Trenorden; Judas Collar – Alison James, Brooke Silcox; Nursery Rhymes – Tom Noakes, Lucy Gaffy, Morgan Benson-Taylor, Will Goodfellow; Tangles and Knots – Renée Marie Petropoulos, Yingna Lu	Best Short Animation: Lost and Found – Lucy Hayes, Andrew Goldsmith, Bradley Slabe; IRONY – Radheya Jegatheva; Monster's Playground – Seamus Spilsbury, Darcy Prendergast, Christina Remnant; Peepin’ – Haein Kim, Paul Rhodes
Best Online Video or Series: Deadlock – Fiona Eagger, Deb Cox, Belinda Mravicic, Billie Pleffer; BC Explained – Carl J Sorheim, David Gannon, Troy Larkin; Homecoming Queens – Michelle Law, Chloe Reeson, Corrie Chen, Katia Nizic; Kiki and Kitty – Liz Watts, Sylvia Warmer, Nakkiah Lui, Catriona McKenzie; Small Town Hackers – Lauren Elliott, Matt Lovkis, Henry Inglis

== Additional awards ==
Best Asian Film
- Dying to Survive (China) — Wang Yibing, Liu Ruifang
  - 1987: When the Day Comes (South Korea) — Jung Won-chan
  - The Bold, The Corrupt and The Beautiful (Taiwan) — Weijan Liu
  - Gali Guleiyan (India) — Shuchi Jain, Dipesh Jain
  - Newton (India) — Manish Mundra, Aanand L. Rai, Sunil Lulla
  - Sanju (India) — Rajkumar Hirani, Vidhu Vinod Chopra
  - Shoplifters (Japan) — Matsuzaki Kaoru, Yose Akihiko, Taguchi Hijiri
  - Tombiruo: Penunggu Rimba (Malaysia) — Zainir Aminullah, Imillya Roslan, Najwa Abu Bakar, Firdaus Hussamuddin
  - Youth (China) — Wang Zhonglei, Wang Zhongjun, Gong Yu, Song Ge

== Individual awards ==
The Longford Lyell Award: Bryan Brown	The Byron Kennedy Award: Ian Darling
