= David Tranter =

Australian filmmaker

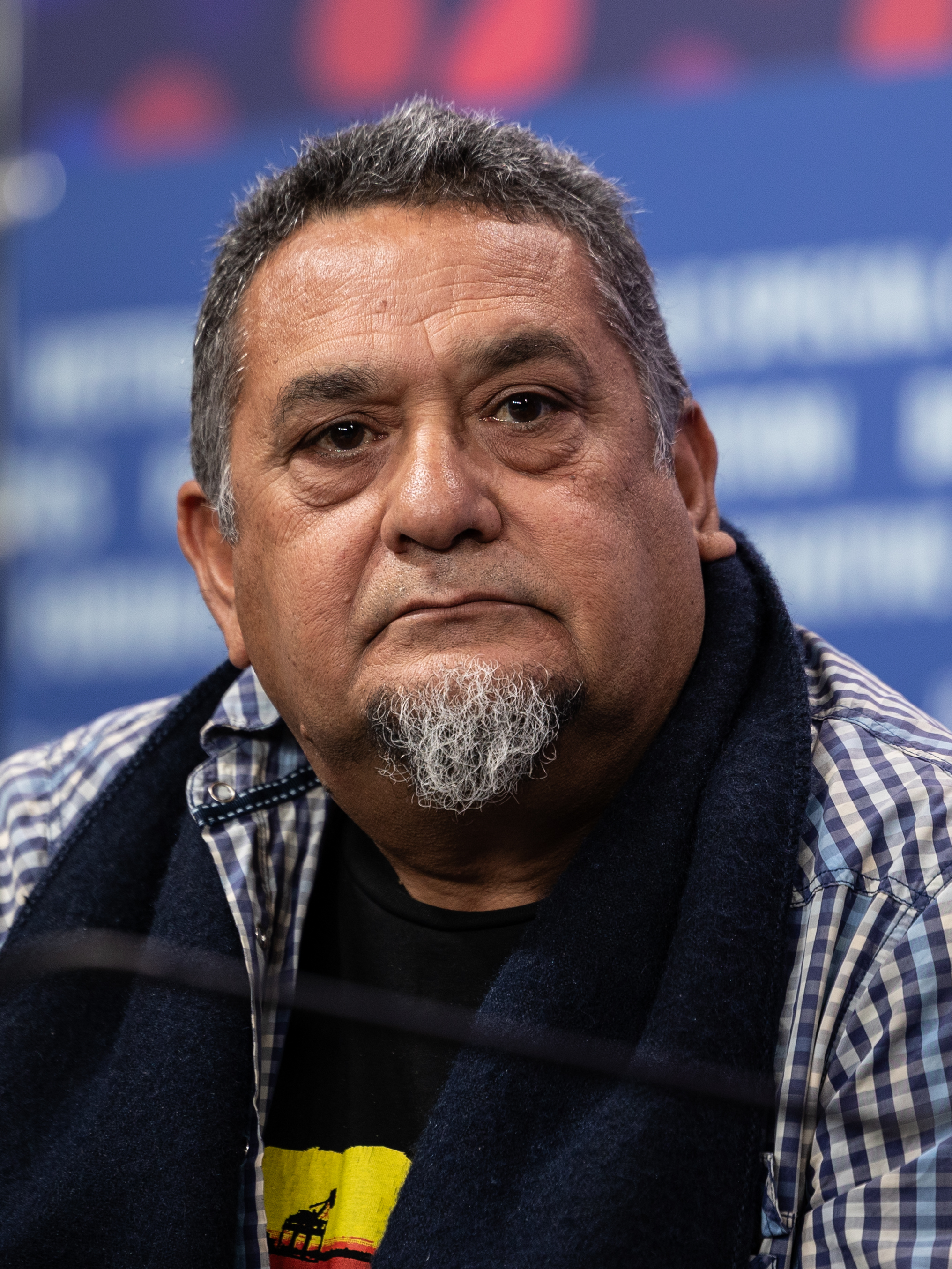
- David Tranter at the 2026 Berlin International Film Festival
- Born: Northern Territory, Australia
- Occupations: Sound recordist, screenwriter, film director
- Notable work: Willaberta Jack (2007), Sweet Country (2017)

David Tranter is an Indigenous Australian sound recordist and filmmaker. He is known for his collaborations with Warwick Thornton, in particular the films Sweet Country and Wolfram, which were based on stories from his family history. He is an Alyawarre man from the Central Desert region of Australia.

== Early life and education ==
David Tranter is an Alyawarre man. Growing up in Alice Springs, Northern Territory, he learnt English as his first language, while his mother and grandparents spoke their own language (Alyawarr). Going "out bush" with his people, he learnt to speak some of languages of the Central Desert, including his mother's language, along with a little Anmatyerr and Arrernte.

He went to primary school and then high school, where he was taught some Indonesian, but: "I didn’t really want to learn that so I left school at the age of 16, didn't get much education".

== Career ==
Tranter began his career as a trainee video and film sound recordist with the Central Australian Aboriginal Media Association (better known as CAAMA) in Alice Springs in 1989. After three years of traineeship, he continued to work on sound in many documentaries, dramas, television series, videos, and feature films at CAAMA, and also became involved in training new trainee sound recordists. He worked in searing desert heat, initially using only a portable 3-channel FP32 mixer and other basic recording equipment. His first opportunity to work on a drama came when cinematographer Warwick Thornton graduated from film school in Sydney and got Tranter to work on his short film Payback (1996).

Tranter's directorial debut came in 2004, when making short films about his own country, the Central Desert region of Australia, which included factual history as well as Dreaming stories. He was sound recordist on many episodes of the long-running language and culture documentary program series Nganampa Anwernekenhe (meaning "Ours" in the Pitjantjatjara and Arrernte languages). (Note: The series began in 1987, broadcasting on Imparja Television hundreds of 30-minute episodes spoken in local languages and subtitled in English. Nearly 31 hours of the series' films are held on videocassette by AIATSIS.) He co-directed the episode Karli Jalangu ("Boomerang Today", 2004) with cinematographer and director Allan Collins, which screened at the Sydney Film Festival and imagineNATIVE film festival in Canada, and directed Crookhat and Camphoo (2005) solo. Crookhat and Camphoo, which Tranter also wrote, was photographed by Allan Collins, edited by Dena Curtis, and featured music by Frank Yamma. It centred on elders Donald "Crook Hat" Akemarr Thompson and Reggie Camphoo Pwerl, who impart some of their deep knowledge and skills in making of spears woomeras (spear-throwers), which had been passed down to them by their fathers.

Among the other hundreds of documentary films he has worked on are Living Country (2005); Karlu Karlu ("Devil's Marbles", 2008); Songlines to the Seine; Running for New York; Spirit Stones; My Brother Vinnie; Art and Soul; First Australians (TV documentary series); and Ochre and Ink (2012). Warwick Thornton was cinematographer on Karlu Karlu. Other sound recording work includes on the short drama films Green Bush, Nana, Plains Empty, and Jacob. In 2009, Tranter was one of six sound recordists on Warwick Thornton's directorial debut feature film, Samson and Delilah.

In 2010 he directed the short documentary Crookhat and the Kulanada, which toured Australia with the Message Sticks Festival in 2011. In it, three old men, Donald ("Crookhat") Akemarr Thompson, Alec Apetyarr Peterson, and Casey Akemarr Holmes, take a trip to a permanent spring and waterhole in the desert, and camp there. They tell stories from their deep knowledge of the place, including the Dreamtime stories of the Rainbow Serpent, Kulunada, which lived in the waterhole, as well as violent conflicts as white settlers came to the area. Dena Curtis edited the film and Eric Murray Lui was cinematographer. "Crookhat" is the father-in-law of Tranter. Executive producer Ray Lillis said of Tranter: "Nobody is more adept than David Tranter at coaxing the real depth of these stories from his subjects. The observational approach highlights the absolute comfort of these old men in their own country".

Tranter was sound recordist on the 2011 drama feature film Here I Am, directed by Beck Cole with Thornton responsible for cinematography.

In 2016, he directed Desert Dingo, a documentary short film in which five senior Alywarr lawmen, travel 450 kilometres (280 mi) from Ali Curung to visit the sacred sites of a significant Songline relating to the dingo. Murray Lui, Shane Mulcahy, and Dylan River were responsible for the cinematography.

=== Willaberta Jack and Sweet Country ===
The 26-minute documentary film Willaberta Jack (2007) tells the true story of Willaberta Jack, the elder brother of Tranter's grandfather, Philomac, who lived in the Northern Territory in the 1920s. Jack, an Aboriginal stockman, shot a white stockman, Harry Henty, in self-defence, and the film tells the story of his subsequent trial and its aftermath in 1929. Paul Henness narrated the film, music was by David Page, Dena Curtis edited it, and Trisha Morton-Thomas was development producer on the film.

The award-winning 2017 feature film Sweet Country, co-written by Tranter (with Steven McGregor) and directed by Warwick Thornton, was based on Willaberta Jack. It was also co-produced by Tranter.

Tranter recalls:

Then I was in the Tiwi Islands with Steve McGregor and Murray Lui working on a film as the sound recordist. After the shoot we went back to the house and had a cup of tea and Murray said that Willaberta Jack story, that would make a great movie. And I said yeah – but I'm not a writer. But I wanted to try so I went and bought myself a couple of sketch books, and I started drawing the story in pictures and it took me about two weeks. Then I sat down with Stephen Cleary who helped me type it up into a treatment. I took it to the Ignite Screenwriting workshop and they helped me get 128 pages written in four days. I was real proud of myself. In the end we did three drafts and I sent each draft to David Jowsey and Steven Mcgregor, and Steven was the one who got the script to the point of making it.

McGregor and Tranter won the University of Melbourne's Kate Challis RAKA Award at the at the Australian Centre Literary Awards 2019 for their script.

=== Television work ===
Tranter has done much sound recording work for TV series, including the drama series The Alice (2005–6); children's series Double Trouble (2008); comedy series Black Comedy from 2014 until 2018; and Preppers in 2021. He also did the sound on the documentary series First Australians.

=== 2020–present ===
In 2025 he was engaged to co-write the script to Thornton's follow-up to Sweet Country, Wolfram, along with Steven McGregor. The story also relates to some of Tranter's family history, this time focusing on the women and children who worked the wolfram (tungsten) mines in Hatches Creek, Western Australia.

== Recognition and awards ==
- 2007: Nominated, Best Documentary, Winnipeg Aboriginal Film Festival, Willaberta Jack
- 2009: Winner, Australian Screen Sound Guild award for Best Sound on a feature film, for Samson and Delilah
- 2009: Nominated, IF Award, for Samson and Delilah
- 2010: Co-winner, AFI Award for Best Sound, for Samson and Delilah
- 2011: Winner, inaugural Bob Plasto Screen Award, awarded by Screen Territory for his contribution to film and television in the Northern Territory
- 2018, at the 8th AACTA Awards, among other awards and nominations, for Sweet Country:
  - Winner, Best Original Screenplay, for Tranter and McGregor
  - Winner, Best Film, for Tranter, Greer Simpkin, David Jowsey
  - Nominated, Best Sound, for Tranter, Thom Kellar, Sam Gain-Emery, Will Sheridan
- 2019: Kate Challis RAKA Award for the script of Sweet Country

== Personal life ==
During his early career, Tranter learnt to speak some Warlpiri.
