= Hatches Creek wolfram field =

Wolfram mine in Northern Territory, Australia

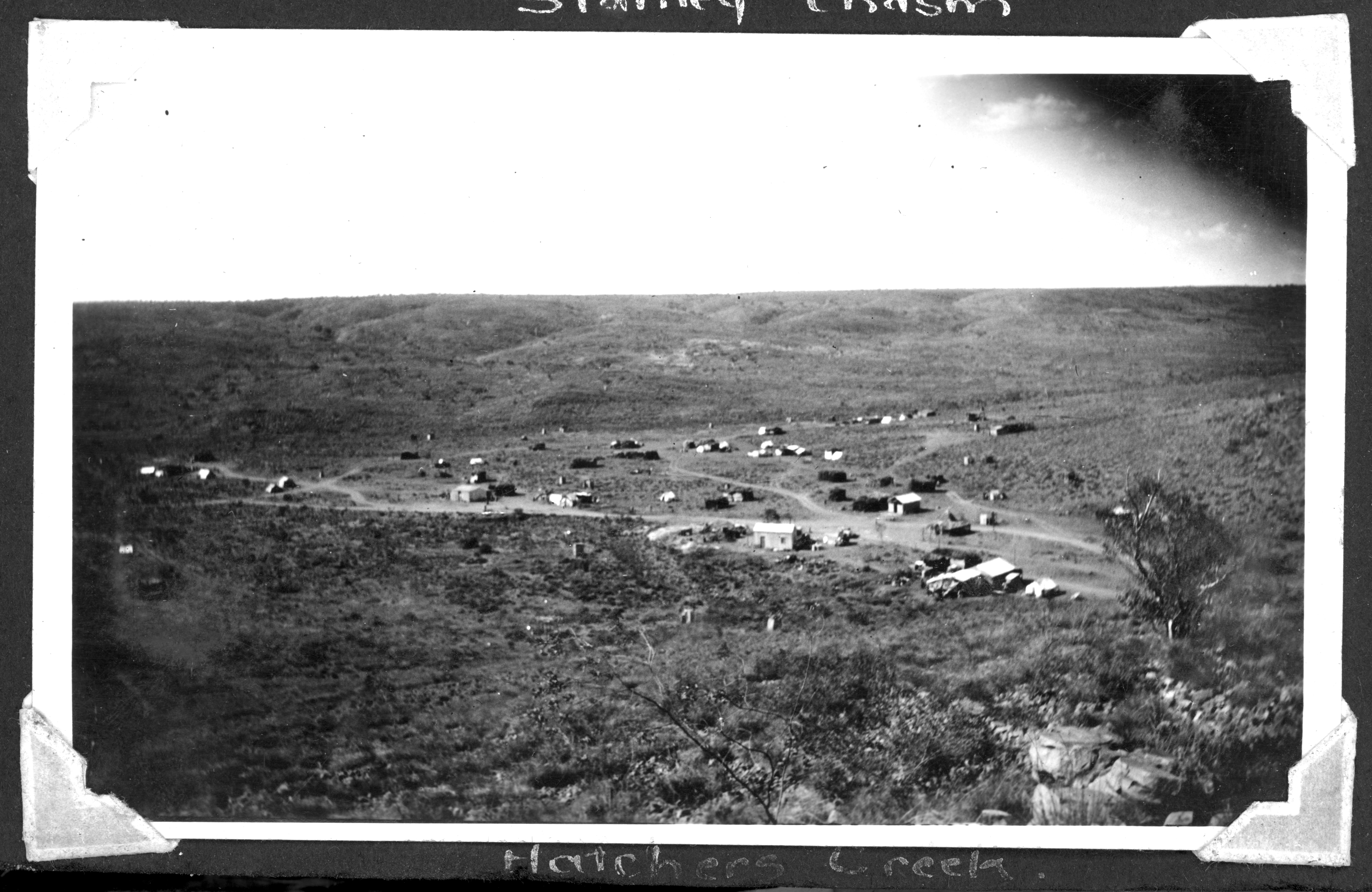
Hatches Creek in 1937 or 1938

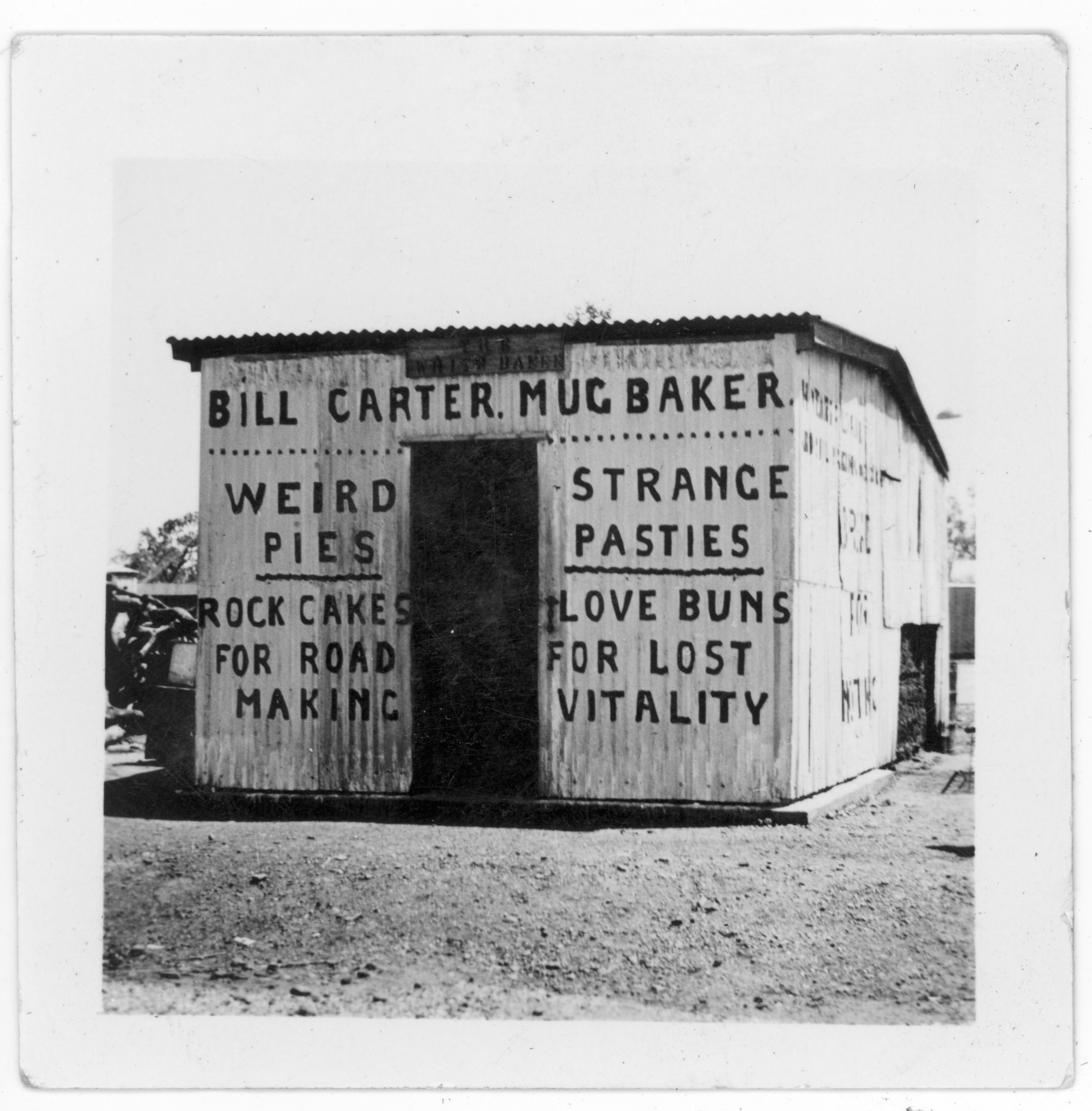
A bakery at Hatches Creek in 1937 or 1938

Hatches Creek wolfram field was an active wolfram, also known as tungsten, mining centre in Australia that first operated between 1915 and 1957 before being abandoned. Mining activities recommenced in 2019. Located on the Barkly Tableland in the Northern Territory, it is 375 kilometres (233 mi) northeast of Alice Springs.

It is on the lands of the Alyawarre, Kaytetye, and Warumungu peoples.

== History ==
Hatches Creek lies on the lands of the Alyawarre, Kaytetye, and Warumungu Aboriginal peoples, with their rights to this land upheld by a successful Native Title Claim in 2005.

Wolfram was first discovered the Hatches Creek during an 1896-1906 expedition by Allan Arthur Davidson but the discovery raised little interest.

As wolfram prices rose in the early 20th century interest increased and, in 1915, the first mining leases being registered by Thomas Hanlon and Richard Edwin Warne (Mineral leases 222–230) who would later forfeit them in 1918. Development of the mining field was slow due to the remoteness of the area and reduced prices. By 1920 the area was largely abandoned.

Mining revived in the 1930s and in 1937 NT Administrator Aubrey Abbott visited the field and found 60 men at work there; this number had increased to between 150 and 200 by the following year. In 1938 a visiting journalist from Walkabout wrote of it:

The field is not without its romance; some of the adventures have gone out there practically broke and returned to civilization with small fortunes, while others have gone out there with money and have been glad to cadge a ride back to Alice Springs on a motor-lorry.

— B Pickhaver, Hatches Creek, Walkabout (1 June 1938)

However, there was a dark side to practices at the mine; Aboriginal children were exploited as labour.

Increased population at the field led to difficulties obtaining water and the nearby Kangaroo Waterhole almost dried up and many of the miners experienced dysentery and other stomach disorders. One of the residents and miners' during this period was Gloria Ouida Lee, who worked alongside her husband Fred "Lofty" Purdy.

During World War II wolfram became increasingly important, and the mining area was taken over by the government under the National Security Regulations in 1942 when Australia was essentially cut off from overseas supplies. The main exporters had been America, Japan, Great Britain, and Germany, who stopped exporting it. This was because one of the primary uses for wolfram was to extract tantalum, which was used in the manufacture of spinnerets for the silk trade and for electric light filaments.

Because of the war, miners on the field were called up for military service, and most of those remaining were ineligible to be called for military service because of age or physical infirmity. To address this, in November 1943, 500 indentured Chinese labourers from Nauru were sent there to mine.

These labourers were evacuated from Nauru (via Townsville), where they had been working on a phosphate mine due to a possible invasion by the Japanese. In Australia they were called the Native Labor Company (Chinese) and other miners in this group were sent to Wauchope (a small town near Karlu Karlu) where wolfram mining was also taking place. Existing miners on the wolfram field were not happy when they arrived and accused them of throwing them off their mines. They also claimed that there had been an 83% reduction in wolfram production following the disruption of their arrival and where accused of adopting a go-slow form of passive resistance.

Ultimately the Consul for China, TM Chen (who was based in Brisbane), intervened and, after visiting the site, believed that the labourers were being kept in shocking conditions although, in response to this it was argued that their condition of living was comparable to other miners working there. It was also alleged that they were not receiving wages, that food and water were being denied and strike actions banned. The Chinese labourers were withdrawn by late 1944 as "requirements for wolfram had been met".

During the war years Darby Jampijinpa Ross also worked on the field before starting work as part of a Native Labour Gang based from Alice Springs.

Mining continued at Hatches Creek after the war and, in 1952, there were plans to established a township there. These plans never eventuated but, in 1953, both a Hatches Creek Miners' Association was formed, led by Simon Rieff. A school was opened and local people advocated for a hospital. Despite this, mining continued to wane in the region and in 1954 it was reported that only 61 people remained there, and by 1957 it was considered closed.

== Today ==
Mining activities recommenced at Hatches Creek in 2019.

As of 2024 there is a nearby homeland called Hatches Creek, where an Aboriginal family group lives.

== In popular media ==
The 2025 feature film Wolfram, directed by Warwick Thornton and co-written by Steven McGregor and David Tranter, is a fictionalised account based on the family stories of both Thornton (Kaytetye) and Tranter (Alyawarre).
