= Erroll Shand =

New Zealand actor

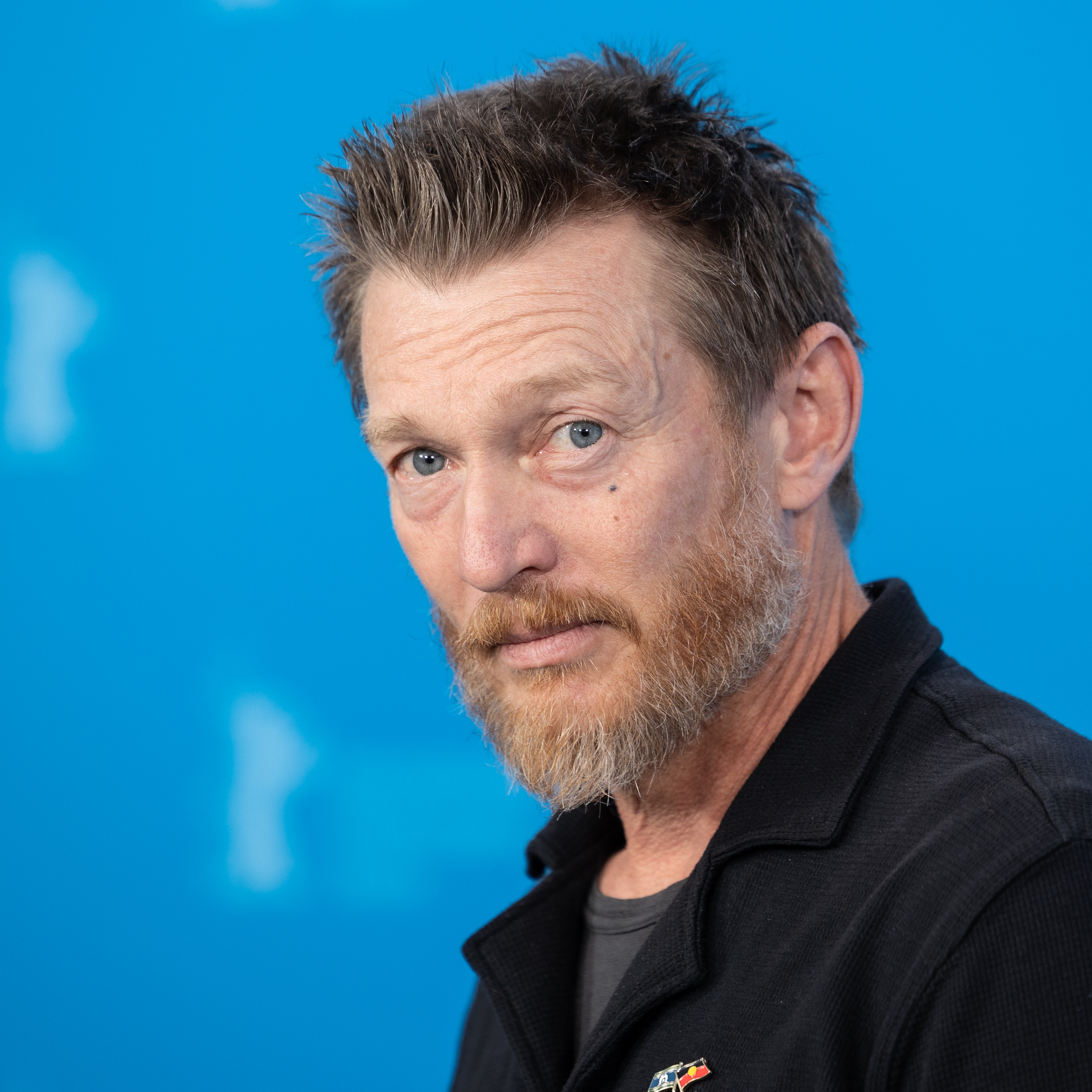
- Shand in 2026
- Occupation: Actor
- Years active: 2000–present
- Notable credits: Vercingetorix in Roman Empire; Captain John Meares in Chief of War; Rob Murphy in All Her Fault

Erroll Shand is a New Zealand actor who has appeared in several New Zealand and Australian TV series and films. He is best known for his portrayal as Vercingetorix in the television series Roman Empire (2017). He appears as Captain John Meares in the 2025 American historical TV series Chief of War.

== Career ==
Shand majored in acting at the University of Queensland, mainly working in Australian television before returning to New Zealand in the early 2000s. He appeared as David in New Zealand TV series The Cult (2009). In Australia, he played Errol in the Australian rural noir series Mystery Road (2018); and Patrick Harrows in The Twelve, in 2022. He is probably best known for his portrayal as Vercingetorix in the 2017 television series Roman Empire.

He plays Captain John Meares in the 2025 American historical series Chief of War.

Shand has also featured in several films, making his debut in the children's fantasy drama The Water Horse in 2007. In 2016, he was in the Brazilian feature "Pequeno Segredo" which was in the nomination list for best foreign language film in the academy awards that year.

In 2025, he appears in the New Zealand films Pike River and Mārama. Also in 2025, he stars in Australian filmmaker Warwick Thornton's 2025 feature Wolfram, set to premiere at the Closing Night Gala of Adelaide Film Festival on 26 October.

All Her Fault is a mystery thriller television miniseries for Peacock starring Sarah Snook, Jake Lacy, and Dakota Fanning. It is based on the 2021 novel of the same name by Andrea Mara. The series premiered on November 6, 2025, and received generally positive reviews from critics, with particular praise for Snook and Fanning's performances. It received two nominations at the 83rd Golden Globe Awards: Best Limited Series and Best Actress – Miniseries for Snook. Shand plays a bookie named Rob Murphy

== Selected filmography ==
=== Film ===
Year	Title	Role	Notes
2007	The Water Horse	Lt. Wormsley	
2012	Safe House	Tony	
2013	Beyond the Edge	Charles Evans	
2016	The Rehearsal	George Saladin	
2022	Whina	Father Mulder	
2025	Pike River	Pete Cahill	
2025	Mārama	Jack Fenton	
2025	Wolfram	Casey	
2026	Evil Dead Burn	Edgar Price	

=== Television ===
Year	Title	Role	Notes
2026	The Airport Chaplain	Lex Pascoe	
2026	Crackhead	Mike Reynolds	
2026	All Her Fault	Rob Murphy	
