= Lifer =

A lifer is a person sentenced to life imprisonment; also a person who makes a career of one of the armed forces, or another profession; or a person who has made a lifelong commitment (as to a way of life).

Lifer or Lifers may also refer to:

== Music ==
- Lifer (band), an American rock band
- "Lifer", a song by Down, from the album NOLA
- "Lifer", a 2016 song by Florida Georgia Line
- Lifer (album), a 2017 album by MercyMe
- Lifers, a 2018 album by Cody Jinks
- Lifers (album), a 2020 album by Local H

== Film and television ==
- Lifer (2014 film), a 2014 short film by Ervin Chartrand

== Other uses ==
- "Lifer" or "lifer bird", a bird species that has been seen for the first time, adding to a birdwatcher's life list
