= Wolfram (film) =

2025 Australian film

- International promotional poster
- Directed by: Warwick Thornton
- Written by: David Tranter; Steven McGregor
- Produced by: Greer Simpkin; David Jowsey
- Starring: Deborah Mailman; Pedrea Jackson; Joe Bird; Thomas M. Wright; Luka May Glynn-Cole; Anni Finsterer; Natassia Gorey-Furber; Erroll Shand; John Howard; Jason Chong; Matt Nable
- Cinematography: Warwick Thornton
- Edited by: Nick Meyers
- Production companies: Bunya Productions; Retroflex Lateral; Wolfram Studios
- Distributed by: Bonsai Films
- Release date: 26 October 2025 (Adelaide)
- Running time: 100 minutes
- Country: Australia
- Languages: English; Arrernte

Wolfram is a 2025 Australian Western drama film directed by Warwick Thornton. It is a sequel to Thornton's 2017 film Sweet Country, reprising several of the same characters. It stars Deborah Mailman, Pedrea Jackson, Thomas M. Wright and Luka May Glynn-Cole. The title refers to the Hatches Creek wolfram field in the Northern Territory, where Aboriginal Australian children were exploited for their labour, digging tungsten out of the ground.

The film had its world premiere at the 2025 Adelaide Film Festival on 26 October, followed by its international premiere at the main competition of the 76th Berlin International Film Festival on 17 February 2026, where it was nominated for the Golden Bear.

== Synopsis ==
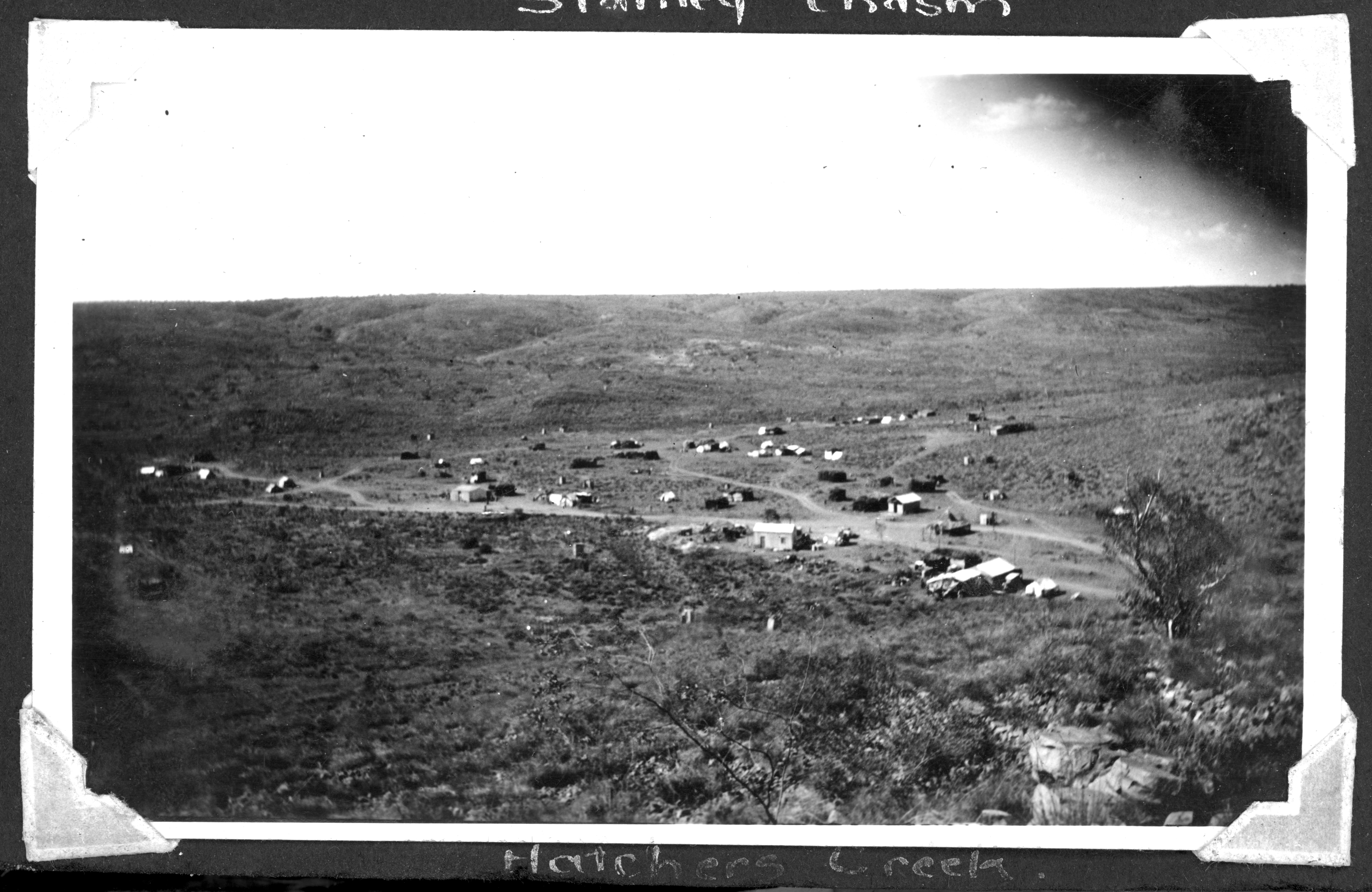
Hatches Creek in 1937 or 1938

Based on a real story and set in 1932, the film centres on a mother longing for the return of her stolen children. It looks at the exploitation of Indigenous Australian child labour at the Hatches Creek wolfram field, a tungsten mine in the Northern Territory of Australia.

== Cast ==
- Deborah Mailman as Pansy
- Pedrea Jackson as Philomac
- Hazel Jackson as Max
- Eli Hart as Kid
- Erroll Shand As Casey
- Joe Bird as Frank
- Thomas M. Wright as Mick Kennedy
- Luka May Glynn-Cole as Olive
- Anni Finsterer as Nell
- Gibson John as Archie
- Natassia Gorey-Furber as Lizzie
- John Howard as Matthews
- Aidan Du Chiem as Jimmi
- Ferdinand Hoang as Shi
- Jason Chong as Zhang
- Matt Nable as Billy

== Production ==
=== Development ===
Wolfram was written by Steven McGregor and David Tranter, and produced by Greer Simpkin and David Jowsey of Bunya Productions, along with co-producer Drew Bailey. Thornton served as director and cinematographer, while frequent collaborator Nick Meyers edited the film.

It is a sequel to Thornton's 2017 film Sweet Country, set four years later, and features some of the same characters. Its genre is mixed: drama / history / Australian Western. The story is based on some of writer Tranter's Alyawarra family history, told from the perspective of the women and children. Thornton's great-grandmother and her daughters also worked at Hatches Creek. Arrernte Traditional Owners, led by elder Theresa Alice, worked as First Nations consultants.

Funding was provided by Screen Australia, in association with Screen Territory, NITV, Screen NSW, and the Adelaide Film Festival Investment Fund.

=== Filming ===
Filming took place in Alice Springs, with post-production done in New South Wales.

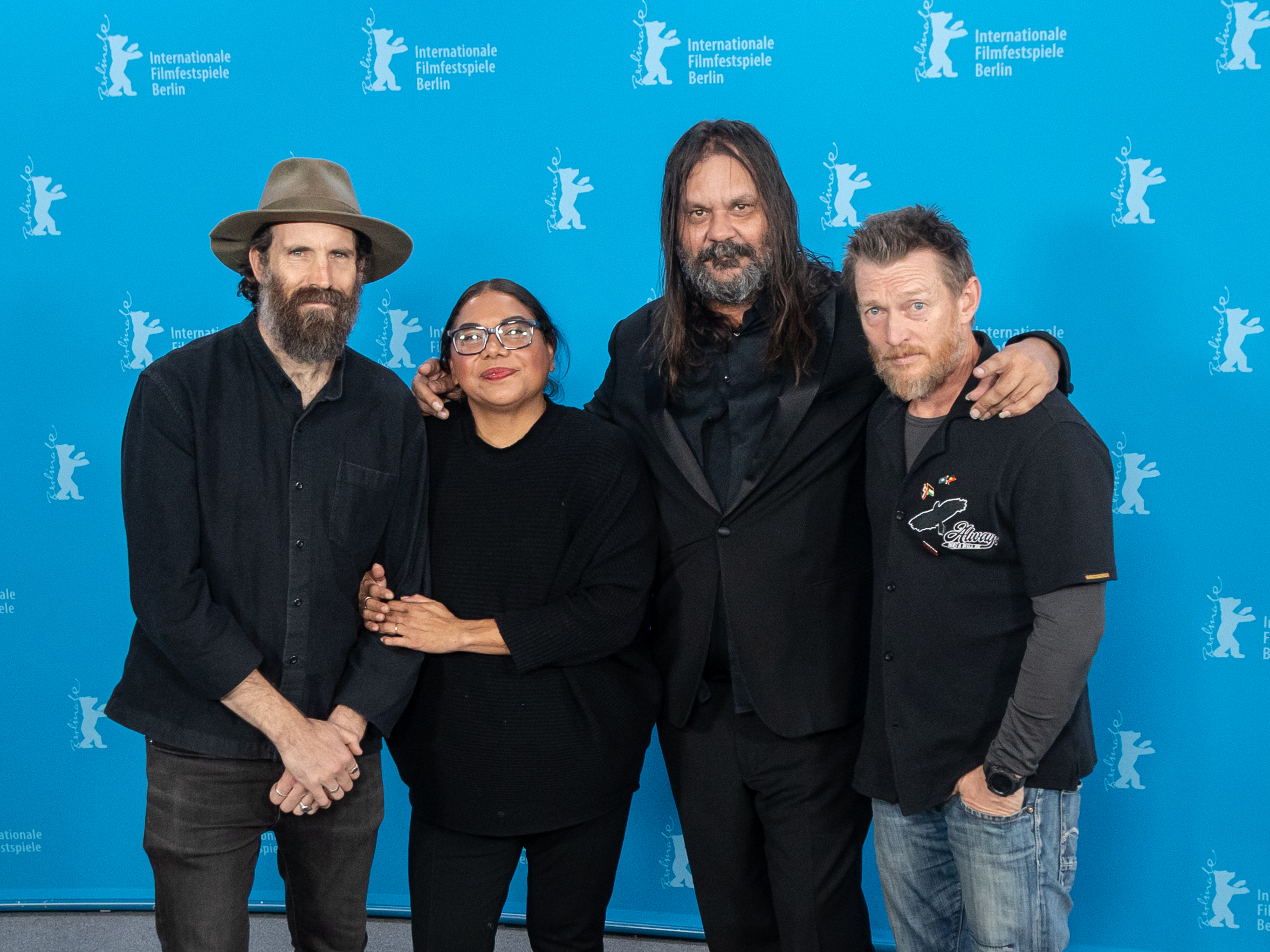
Warwick Thornton and cast members Deborah Mailman, Erroll Shand and Thomas M. Wright at the 76th Berlin International Film Festival

== Release ==
Wolfram had its world premiere on the closing night of the Adelaide Film Festival on 26 October 2025. It screened in competition at the 76th Berlin International Film Festival on 17 February 2026.

An advance preview including a Q&A session with the director will be hosted at the Palace Nova in Adelaide on 26 April 2026, followed by general release in Australian cinemas on 30 April.

== Reception ==
As of 4 March 2026, the film has a score of 92% on review aggregator Rotten Tomatoes, based on 12 reviews.

Luke Buckmaster, reviewing the film in The Guardian after its Adelaide premiere, gave it 3 out of 5 stars, praising the performances but saying the film "never quite comes together".

Irrestible Magazine reviewed the film after its Berlinale screening, praising the cinematography and performances, calling Hazel May Jackson a "superstar on the rise". The reviewer said that the film "is no doubt going to cut through in multiple territories, and instantly hit hero status back home". Variety also had praise for the cinematography, and called the film "essentially a survival thriller realised via the genre trappings of a Western". David Rooney of The Hollywood Reporter thought that it does not surpass the "poetic simplicity" of Thornton's 2009 Samson & Delilah, but it "represents a very solid entry in his impressive body of work".

Damon Wise of Deadline praised the writing, cinematography, and "Thornton's controlled execution", calling Wolfram "a modern classic", and "a surprisingly emotional genre piece that simmers with menace and doesn't let up until the bloody finale". Jonathan Romney, writing in Screen Daily, found the film "visually stunning" and praised the performances, but thought that the narrative lacked cohesion, compared with Sweet Country.
