= Here I Am (2011 film) =

2011 film

- Directed by: Beck Cole
- Written by: Beck Cole
- Produced by: Kath Shelper
- Starring: Shai Pittman
- Cinematography: Warwick Thornton
- Edited by: Roland Gallois
- Music by: Cliff Bradley
- Production company: Scarlett Pictures
- Distributed by: Madman, Footprint Films, Transmission Films
- Release date: 26 February 2011
- Running time: 90 minutes
- Country: Australia
- Language: English

Here I Am is a 2011 Australian drama film written and directed by Beck Cole, with cinematography by Warwick Thornton. It tells the story of an Aboriginal woman finding her way back to her family after being released from prison.

== Plot ==
The film tells the story of a young Aboriginal woman who has been recently released from prison, and wishes to turn her life around. She finds her way to a women's refuge, where she meets a number of other Aboriginal women, all escaping problems, who provide support as she tries to reconnect with her family, including her estranged mother, Lois, and her child, Rosie who is in the care of her grandmother.

== Cast ==
The cast includes:

- Shai Pittman as Karen Burden
- Bruce Carter as Jeff
- Quinaiha Scott as Rosie
- Pauline Whyman as Skinny
- Marcia Langton as Lois, Karen's estranged mother
- Vanessa Worrall
- Betty Sumner
- Tanith Glynn-Maloney
- Carol Collins

== Production ==
Here I Am, a drama, is Beck Cole's debut feature film as writer/director, and Shai Pittman's first acting role. The film was shot around Port Adelaide, with some scenes in Adelaide Women's Prison and almost all of the characters are Aboriginal Australians.

Warwick Thornton, former partner of Cole, was director of photography, while Roland Gallois did the editing. The production company was Scarlett Pictures, with the main producer being Kath Shelper. David Tranter was sound recordist for the film.

The music is by Cliff Bradley, with additional songs by the Yeah Yeah Yeahs, PJ Harvey and others.

== Release ==
The film premiered at the 2011 Adelaide Film Festival on 26 February 2011, where it received a standing ovation by the audience. It was afterwards distributed by Madman, Footprint Films, and Transmission Films, shown in Australian cinemas from 2 June 2011.

It was shown on ABC Television on 8 December 2011 and later shown on SBS Television's streaming service.

== Accolades ==
- Screened in competition at the Montréal World Film Festival.
- Nominated, International Feature award at the Adelaide Film Festival
- Winner, Best Dramatic Feature, ImagineNative Film + Media Arts Festival
