= WAFF =

WAFF may refer to:

- Royal West African Frontier Force, a former British Army regiment
- Tylwyth Waff, a character in the Dune universe
- WAFF (TV), a television station in Huntsville, Alabama, United States
- West Asian Football Federation, an association for football in West Asia
- Winnipeg Aboriginal Film Festival, a film festival in Canada
