= Michaeley O'Brien =

Australian writer

Michaeley O'Brien is an Australian television writer, script editor and script producer.

== Early life and education ==
Born in Mudgee, New South Wales, Michaeley O'Brien grew up in Gulgong and studied at Charles Sturt University in Bathurst as well as the Australian Film Television and Radio School.

== Career ==
O'Brien worked as script producer on Water Rats and McLeod's Daughters.

She wrote episodes 5, 6, 9, and 12 of Underbelly: Razor in 2011.

For series one of Mystery Road, released in 2018, O' Brien was co-writer with Steven McGregor, Kodie Bedford, and Tim Lee.

== Recognition ==
O'Brien received a nomination in the Television – Series category at the 2005 AWGIE Awards for the Blue Heelers episode "Crash Site".

Mystery Road Episode 1, "Gone", was shortlisted for the NSW Premier's Literary Awards, Betty Rowland Prize for Scriptwriting, 2019.

== Selected credits ==
- Home and Away
- Blue Heelers
- Neighbours
- McLeod's Daughters
- Out of the Blue
- All Saints
- City Homicide
- Water Rats
- Rescue: Special Ops
- Sea Patrol
- Underbelly: Razor
- Mystery Road
- The Claremont Murders (2023)
- Territory (2024)
