= The Beach (TV series) =

Australian television documentary series

- Genre: Miniseries, Documentary
- Directed by: Warwick Thornton
- Starring: Warwick Thornton
- Composers: Megan Washington; Kristin Rule
- Country of origin: Australia
- Original language: English
- No. of seasons: 1
- No. of episodes: 6

Production
- Executive producers: Warwick Thornton; Ben Nott
- Producers: Michelle Parker; Mitchell Stanley; Tanith Glynn-Maloney
- Cinematography: Dylan River
- Editor: Andrea Lang
- Running time: 24-27 minutes
- Production company: World Wide Mind

Original release
- Network: NITV and SBS
- Release: 29 May 2020

The Beach is an Australian television documentary series on SBS TV and NITV. The six-part documentary series first screened as a special three-hour TV event on 29 May 2020. It was created, directed by Aboriginal filmmaker Warwick Thornton who also stars in it and is filmed by his son Dylan River for Exile Productions.

Filmed in Jilirr, Dampier Peninsula, on the north-west coast of Western Australia, The Beach was filmed over a month at a lone beachside shack that was constructed for the documentary. The series has a focus on food and place.Thornton forages and fishes around his camp, using an ancient Toyota Jeep (which earlier appeared in an episode of Mystery Road). It is an example of slow television.

The series was shot using a Panavision DXL2 camera.

== Awards ==
- Winner, Best Cinematography in a Documentary to Dylan River, 11th AACTA Awards, 2021
- Nominee, Best Original Music Score in a Documentary to Megan Washington & Kristin Rule, 11th AACTA Awards, 2021

== Episodes ==
Story	No. in series	Title	Original release date
1	1	"Too Mad Too Shy"	May 29, 2020
2	2	"Grow You Little Bastard"	May 29, 2020
3	3	"Survived Another Day"	May 29, 2020
4	4	"Coconut Killer"	May 29, 2020
5	5	"Are You Here For Me"	May 29, 2020
6	6	"Don't be a D...."	May 29, 2020

== See also ==
- River Cottage
