= Ervin Chartrand =

- Born: Winnipegosis, Manitoba, Canada
- Education: University of Winnipeg (Bachelor of Arts, 2017)
- Notable work: 504938C (2005); First Stories: Patrick Ross (2006)
- Awards: 2005 Winnipeg Aboriginal Film Festival - New Talent Award, 2006 Yorkton Film Festival, Golden Sheaf Award - Aboriginal, 2006 ReelWorld Film Festival, ReelWorld Award - Outstanding Canadian Short Film

Ervin Chartrand is a Canadian and Pine Creek First Nation director, writer and producer. He is best known for directing the films 504938C (2005) and First Stories: Patrick Ross (2006).

== Personal life ==
Ervin Chartrand is a Métis/Ojibwe from Pine Creek First Nation Camperville, Manitoba, Canada.

Chartrand earned a Bachelor of Arts degree in film studies from the University of Winnipeg in 2017.

== Career ==
Chartrand first began his career in film in 2003, after enrolling in Winnipeg's Aboriginal Broadcast Training Initiative, sponsored by the Manitoba Indian Cultural Education Centre. He worked as a camera assistant on the APTN TV series The Sharing Circle and the Canadian TV series Tipi Tales as a puppet wrangler. Chartrand studied acting with the Academy of Broadcasting Corporation in Winnipeg.

In 2005, Chartrand received the Winnipeg Aboriginal Film Festival, Best New Talent award for the film 504938C (2005). 50938C was created with the support of the Winnipeg Film Group's First Film program. In 2006, he won the Reelworld Film Festival, Reel World Award for Outstanding Canadian Short Film for Patrick Ross (2006). He was invited to direct this short film by the National Film Board of Canada for the movie series First Stories, the Manitoba (Volume I). Patrick Ross also won the 2006 Yorkton Film Festival Golden Sheaf Award - Aboriginal. If this Was Right (2008), a film with rap artist and CBC host Wab Kinew and directed by Chartrand, was nominated for the 2008 Aboriginal Peoples Choice Music Award, Best Music Video. Chartrand was the winner of the Canwest Mentorship Program at the 2010 imagineNATIVE film + Media Arts Festival. In 2017, Other Side of The 49th: The Garry Sawatzky Story was nominated for the Yorkton Film Festival Golden Sheaf Award - Documentary History & Biography.

== Filmography ==
| Year | Title | Role | Notes | Reference |
|---|---|---|---|---|
| 2005 | 504938C | Director/Producer/Writer | Winnipeg Film Group's First Film program short film | |
| 2006 | First Stories - Patrick Ross | Director/Writer | NFB Prairie Centre: First Stories a competitive documentary production program. | |
| 2007 | Sister | Director | APTN’s Short Cuts program | |
| 2008 | If this Was Right | Director | Music video with rap artist and CBC host Wab Kinew | |
| 2011 | Life From 95 | Director/Writer/Producer | Short film | |
| 2012 | Fight | Director/Writer | NFB Short film | |
| 2014 | Lifer | Director/Writer | Short film | |
| 2014 | Trafficking | Director/Writer | Short film | |
| 2015 | Illusion Delusion | Director/Writer | Short film | |
| 2016 | Other Side of 49th: The Garry Sawatzky Story | Director/Writer | TV movie | |
