= Territory (TV series) =

2024 Australian neo-Western drama television series

- Genre: Neo-Western; Drama
- Created by: Ben Davies and Timothy Lee
- Written by: Timothy Lee; Kodie Bedford; Steven McGregor; Michaeley O'Brien
- Directed by: Greg McLean
- Starring: Anna Torv; Michael Dorman; Robert Taylor; Sam Corlett
- Theme music composer: Johnny Klimek; Gabriel Isaac Mounsey
- Country of origin: Australia
- Original language: English
- No. of seasons: 1
- No. of episodes: 6

Production
- Executive producers: Rob Gibson; Ben Davies; Ian Collie
- Producer: Paul Ranford
- Production companies: Easy Tiger Productions; Ronde

Original release
- Network: Netflix
- Release: 24 October 2024

Territory is an Australian six-part neo-Western drama television series. Starring Anna Torv, Michael Dorman, Robert Taylor, and Sam Corlett, the plot centres on a family running the world's largest cattle station. The series was released on Netflix on 24 October 2024. In February 2025, the series was cancelled after one season.

== Plot ==
The world's largest cattle station, Marianne Station, located in the Northern Territory of Australia, has been owned for generations by the Lawson family dynasty. It becomes a prize to be sought after by rival cattle station families, various gangsters, Australian Aboriginal elders, and mining magnates, when patriarch Colin Lawson's favoured son, Daniel, dies after a suspicious riding accident.

As Daniel has been managing the cattle station and heading up the powerful Territory Cattlemens' Association, the first episode unfolds with a twofold major battle for succession beginning at Dan's funeral.

The second episode centres on the search for Marshall, Colin's wayward grandson. Marshall bears several grudges against the family but is thrown into the limelight when Colin impetuously announces him as heir in place of Dan's brother, Graham, an alcoholic. There is also a vote for the vacancy left by Dan Lawson in leading the Territory Cattlemen's Association that is powerful in controlling sub-contracting and export, lost by Graham Lawson in favour of an ambitious rival.

== Cast ==
- Anna Torv as Emily Lawson, wife of Graham Lawson, mother of Susie Lawson, stepmother of Marshall Lawson
- Michael Dorman as Graham Lawson, elder son of Colin Lawson, brother of Daniel Lawson, father of Marshall and Susie Lawson
- Sam Corlett as Marshall Lawson, son of Graham Lawson and his first wife who died before the series' events, grandson of Colin Lawson
- Robert Taylor as Colin Lawson, patriarch of the Lawson family and owner of Marianne Station, father of Daniel and Graham Lawson, father-in-law of Emily Lawson, and grandfather of Marshall and Susie Lawson
- Clarence Ryan as Nolan Brannock, an Aboriginal stockman who has worked with the Lawsons in the past
- Hamilton Morris as Uncle Bryce, an Aboriginal elder
- Jake Ryan as Daniel Lawson, younger son of Colin Lawson, heir apparent of Marianne Station at the beginning of the series
- Philippa Northeast as Susie Lawson, daughter of Graham and Emily Lawson, granddaughter of Colin Lawson
- Sara Wiseman as Sandra Kirby, a mining magnate
- Joe Klocek as Lachie Kirby, son of Sandra Kirby and love interest of Susie Lawson
- Kylah Day as Sharnie Kennedy, friend and love interest of Marshall Lawson and Rich Petrakis
- Jay Ryan as Campbell Miller, rival station owner to Colin and Graham Lawson
- Dan Wyllie as Hank Hodge, Emily Lawson's brother
- Conor Merrigan-Turner as Ethan Hodge, Hank Hodge's son
- Sam Delich as Rich Petrakis, friend of Marshall Lawson and Sharnie Kennedy
- Tuuli Narkle as Keeley Redford, an Aboriginal woman
- Tyler Spencer as Dezi, a young Aboriginal man taken under Nolan Brannock's mentorship
- Eddie Baroo as Thug / Arsonist

== Episodes ==
No.	Title	Directed by	Written by	Original release date
1	"Episode 1"	Greg McLean	Timothy Lee	October 24, 2024
2	"Episode 2"	Greg McLean	Kodie Bedford	October 24, 2024
3	"Episode 3"	Greg McLean	Steven McGregor	October 24, 2024
4	"Episode 4"	Greg McLean	Michaeley O'Brien	October 24, 2024
5	"Episode 5"	Greg McLean	Steven McGregor	October 24, 2024
6	"Episode 6"	Greg McLean	Timothy Lee	October 24, 2024

== Background and production ==
Tim Lee and Ben Davies (of Ronde) were the creators of the series. Davies also co-executive produced, and Lee co-wrote the episodes with Kodie Bedford, Steven McGregor, and Michaeley O'Brien. Greg McLean directed and Paul Ranford produced the series. It is jointly produced by Easy Tiger Productions and Ronde, with support from Screen Territory and the South Australian Film Corporation (SAFC).

The series was first titled Desert King, with its new title, Territory, announced in July 2024, three months before its release.

Filming locations included Kakadu National Park and Tipperary Station, both in the Northern Territory of Australia, as well as Mallala, a small town on the Adelaide Plains. Production and post-production took place in Adelaide, South Australia. It is the biggest Netflix production to be filmed in South Australia.

During production, around 140 of the 180 NT staff lived at the station, which is situated in a very remote location. The series is one of the largest local productions filmed in both the Northern Territory and South Australia.

== Release ==
There was a preview screening at the Palace Nova in Adelaide on 22 October 2024, attended by 150 guests, including many of the cast and crew, along with politicians, SAFC board members, and others.

The six-part series aired on Netflix from 24 October 2024.

In February 2025, the series was cancelled by Netflix ANZ after one season, with no explanation given, despite its positive reception.

== Reception ==
As of June 2025, Territory has an approval rating of 87% based on 15 reviews on the review aggregator website Rotten Tomatoes, with the Critics Consensus saying: "A down and dirty neo-Western set Down Under, Territory's outlandish twists and cultural specificity make for compulsively watchable television". Metacritic, which uses a weighted average, assigned a score of 71 out of 100 based on 4 critics, indicating "generally favorable" reviews. Most of the reviews commented on the stunning locations, drone shots, and the amount of effort put into the props, showing a side of Australia not usually seen in popular TV series.

Within a week of its release, the series reached number 2 on Netflix’s "Global Top 10 English TV shows", attracting 6.4 million views within four days. It also took a Top 10 position in 74 countries, including number 1 in 11 countries.

Luke Buckmaster of The Guardian gave it 4 stars out of 5, calling it a "rollicking Aussie drama... a sensationally heady mix", and praising the lead and supporting cast, in particular Clarence Ryan. Buckmaster and others have compared the plot to the popular American series, Yellowstone, as well as the comedy drama series Succession.

Daniel Fienberg of The Hollywood Reporter thought it somewhat derivative, but distinctive in several ways. He also wrote that "Territory does better than Yellowstone in its attempts at weaving the Native perspective into the storytelling", with Indigenous Australians represented as the traditional owners of the land. Alexa Scarlata, a research fellow at RMIT University, wrote that the series "does a great job of establishing a simmering tension between the traditional owners of the land and the families and businesses that have taken possession of it", although thought that it moved a bit slowly, perhaps catering for the international audience who were not familiar with the Australian context.

Anthony Morris of ScreenHub Australia gave the series 4 stars out of 5, headlining his review "a soapy Shakespearean outback saga".
