= 2011 Adelaide Film Festival =

Australian film festival

- Opening film: Mrs Carey's Concert
- Closing film: Mad Bastards
- Location: Adelaide, Australia
- Founded: 2002
- Awards: International Award for Best Feature Film (Incendies); Don Dunstan Award (Judy Davis)
- Directors: Katrina Sedgwick
- No. of films: 12 (In Competition)
- Festival date: 24 February – 6 March 2011
- Website: adelaidefilmfestival.org

The 5th Adelaide Film Festival took place in Adelaide, Australia, from 24 February to 6 March 2011. Katrina Sedgwick was again Festival Director. Julietta Sichel was the head of the jury for the main competition. Judy Davis received the 2011 Don Dunstan Award for her contribution to the Australian film industry on the opening night of the Festival. The glass statuette was presented by Australian filmmaker Fred Schepisi.

A special screening of the 2010 Restoration Version of Fritz Lang's classic sci-fi epic Metropolis was shown with a new score, written by The New Pollutants. This original score was conceived, composed and recorded over a 12-month period, and had its world premiere at the 2005 Adelaide Film Festival.

The festival opened with Mrs Carey's Concert, directed by Bob Connolly and Sophie Raymond, and closed with Mad Bastards, directed by Brendan Fletcher. The film poster for the festival featured a man projecting a film from within himself, illustrating the theme "See Within."

The Canadian film Incendies won the International Award for Best Feature Film.

== Competition ==
=== Jury ===
The following people were selected for the In Competition Jury:

- Julietta Sichel, Czech film critic (President)
- Trevor Groth, American Artistic Director, Sundance Film Festival
- Pierre Rissient, French film director
- Hossein Valamanesh, Australian artist
- Robin Gutch, British producer, Warp Films

=== In Competition ===
The following films were selected for the In Competition section:

English title	Original title	Director(s)	Production country/countries
The Four Times	Le Quattro Volte	Michaelangelo Frammartino	Italy
Here I Am	Here I Am	Beck Cole	Australia
Incendies	Incendies	Denis Villeneuve	Canada
Meek's Cutoff	Meek’s Cutoff	Kelly Reichardt	United States
Mysteries of Lisbon	Mistérios de Lisboa	Raoul Ruiz	Portugal; France
Nostalgia for the Light	Nostalgia de la luz	Patricio Guzmán	France; Chile; Germany; Spain; USA
October	Octubre	Daniel Vega, Diego Vega	Peru
The Piano in a Factory	Gang de qin	Zhang Meng	China
Shut Up Little Man!	Shut Up Little Man!	Matthew Bate	Australia
Tuesday, After Christmas	Marti, dupa craciun	Radu Muntean	Romania
Whisper with the Wind	Sirta la gal ba	Shahram Alidi	Iran
Year Without a Summer	Year Without a Summer	Tan Chui Mui	Malaysia

== Special Screenings ==
Title	Director(s)	Production country
Metropolis	Fritz Lang	Germany
The Water Magician	Kenji Mizoguchi	Japan

== Awards ==
The International Award for Best Feature Film

The International Award for Best Feature Film was won by the Canadian film Incendies directed by Denis Villeneuve.

Audience Award

The Audience Award for Best Feature Film was won by Snowtown.

The Audience Award for Best Documentary was won by Senna.

The Audience Award for Best Short Film was won by The Palace.

Don Dunstan Award

The Don Dunstan Award was won by Judy Davis.
