= Rona Glynn-McDonald =

Indigenous Australian advocate and musician

Rona Glynn-McDonald, also known by her stage name RONA., is an Aboriginal Australian activist, advocate, and musician. She is known as the founder of the not-for-profit Common Ground.

== Early life and education ==
Rona Glynn-McDonald is the daughter of film-makers Warwick Thornton and Penelope McDonald; she is also the granddaughter of Freda Glynn and the sister of Dylan River. She grew up in Alice Springs (Mparntwe). She is a Kaytetye woman.

She later studied economics in Melbourne, where she began to think about the role that cultural capital plays in sustainable development for First Nations communities, and why western economic systems were not serving her people. This led her to realise the importance of storytelling in shaping the understanding of both the present and the past.

== Career ==
=== Advocacy ===
Glynn-McDonald is the founder and board director of First Nations-led not-for-profit Common Ground and the director of First Nations Futures, which she also co-founded. Common Ground aims to amplify and back First Nations voices, strengthen the storytelling ecosystem and educate and build accountability amongst the wider community; this is often done through campaigns and advocacy work. Another aim of Common Ground, which Glynn-McDonald works towards, is redistributing wealth to First Nations communities.

=== Music ===
She is also a music producer and DJ who goes under the artists name RONA.

RONA. released her debut EP 'Closure' in 2022, followed by 'It's All Here' in 2025.

=== Other activities ===
Glynn-McDonald was also the executive producer on her mother's (Penelope McDonald) 2023 documentary film Audrey Napanangka.

In 2026 it was announced that she was receiving a two-year, place-based, participatory arts project through Regional Arts Australia. This project will take place on Kaytetye lands in Central Australia and will be led by Kaytetye women. It will focus on creation through song and revitalising Awelye (women's ceremonial song, dance and body-painting traditions).

== Recognition ==
In 2019, Glynn-McDonald received the Diana Award for her work in creating and sustaining positive change for Australia through the sharing of First Nations stories about First Nations people.
