= Kath Shelper =

Australian film producer

Kath Shelper is an Australian film producer, known for Samson and Delilah. Her production company is called Scarlett Pictures.

== Career ==
Shelper's production credits include a number of short films and telemovies, including Confessions of a Headhunter, Plains Empty, Bush Mechanics, Above The Dust Level, and Green Bush.

Her first feature film, Samson and Delilah, was directed and filmed by Warwick Thornton, and she produced Beck Cole's first feature film, Here I Am in 2011.

In 2015, Shelper produced the film Ruben Guthrie, and between 2014 and 2020 produced many episodes of the TV comedy series, Black Comedy.

Shelper produced two feature films that were released in 2023, both shot in South Australia - Warwick Thornton's The New Boy and Kitty Green's The Royal Hotel.

== Production companies ==
She was a founding member of the film production company Film Depot along with fellow producers Louise Smith and Matthew Dabner, but since 1998 has worked out of her own production company, Scarlett Pictures.

== Accolades ==
She was the recipient of the 2005 Inside Film Rising Talent Award.

Her first feature film, Samson and Delilah directed and filmed by Warwick Thornton, won the Camera d'Or for best first feature at the Cannes Film Festival 2009 and the Showtime Inside Film Award for Best Feature as well as the AFI Award for Best Film in 2009. Her second feature film with Warwick Thornton, The New Boy, also premiered in Un Certain Regard, Cannes Film Festival 2023.

== Selected filmography ==
- Samson and Delilah (2009)
- Here I Am (2011)
- Ruben Guthrie (2015)
- The New Boy (2023)
- The Royal Hotel (2023)
