= 1% (film) =

2017 film by Stephen McCallum

- Film poster
- Directed by: Stephen McCallum
- Written by: Matt Nable
- Produced by: Jamie Hilton; Michael Pontin
- Starring: Ryan Corr; Abbey Lee; Simone Kessell; Josh McConville; Matt Nable; Aaron Pedersen
- Cinematography: Shelley Farthing-Dawe
- Edited by: Veronika Jenet
- Music by: Chris Cobilis
- Production companies: Head Gear Films; Screen Australia; See Pictures; Ticket to Ride; Metrol Technology
- Distributed by: Icon-Dendy
- Release dates: 9 September 2017 (TIFF); 11 October 2017 (Australia)
- Running time: 92 minutes
- Country: Australia
- Language: English

1% (also known as Outlaws) is a 2017 Australian biker film directed by Stephen McCallum and starring Ryan Corr, Abbey Lee and Matt Nable, who also wrote the film. It premiered at the 2017 Toronto International Film Festival in September 2017, where the film was acquired by A24 for North American distribution.

== Plot ==
Set within the underworld of outlaw motorcycle club gangs, the film follows Paddo, Vice President and the heir to the leadership of a motorcycle club, who has to save his brother's life by betraying his president. Paddo has been running the club while its president Knuck serves a three-year prison sentence. When Knuck is released, he clashes with Paddo. When Paddo's brother Skink creates trouble with a rival gang, it sets off a chain of events that forces a violent showdown for control of the Copperheads.

== Cast ==
- Matt Nable as President Knuck
- Ryan Corr as Vice President Paddo
- Abbey Lee as Katrina
- Simone Kessell as Hayley
- Josh McConville as Skink
- Aaron Pedersen as Sugar
- Sam Parsonson as Noisy
- Eddie Baroo as Webby
- Jacqui Williams as Josie

== Release ==
1% had its world premiere in the Discovery section at the 2017 Toronto International Film Festival on 9 September 2017. A24 and DirecTV Cinema subsequently acquired the North American distribution rights to the film, for a tentative 2019 wide release.

== Reception ==
=== Box office ===
The film grossed $76,151 in worldwide theatrical box office, all within Australia.

=== Critical response ===
On review aggregator website Rotten Tomatoes, the film holds an approval rating of 47% based on 17 reviews and an average rating of 5.3/10. On Metacritic, the film has a weighted average score of 24 out of 100, based on 4 critics, indicating "generally unfavorable reviews".

=== Accolades ===
Award	Category	Subject	Result
AACTA Awards (8th)	Best Original Screenplay	Matt Nable	Nominated
AACTA Awards (8th)	Best Actor	Ryan Corr	Nominated
AACTA Awards (8th)	Best Actress	Abbey Lee	Nominated
AACTA Awards (8th)	Best Supporting Actor	Josh McConville	Nominated
AACTA Awards (8th)	Best Supporting Actress	Simone Kessell	Nominated
CGA Award	Best Casting in a Feature Film	Kirsty McGregor	Nominated

== See also ==
- Cinema of Australia
