= Robbie Hood (2019 TV series) =

Australian comedy television miniseries

- Genre: Comedy
- Created by: Dylan River
- Written by: Dylan River; Kodie Bedford
- Directed by: Dylan River
- Starring: Pedrea Jackson; Jordan Johnson; Levi Thomas
- Composer: Andy Golledge
- Country of origin: Australia
- Original language: English
- No. of series: 1
- No. of episodes: 6

Production
- Executive producers: Charlie Aspinwall; Daley Pearson
- Producers: Tanith Glynn-Maloney; Meg O'Connell
- Cinematography: Drew English; Tyson Perkins
- Running time: 10 minutes

Original release
- Network: SBS
- Release: 5 July 2019

Robbie Hood is an Australian comedy television series created by Dylan River. It has six episodes of ten minute each. It aired on SBS Viceland and appeared on SBS on Demand in July 2019.

It follows three kids growing up in Alice Springs (Mparntwe).

== Cast ==
- Pedrea Jackson as Robbie Hood
- Jordan Johnson as Georgia Blue
- Levi Thomas as Little Johnny
- Andy Golledge as Robbie's Dad
- Tiara Doolan as Mim
- Dan Falzon as Shane the Copper
- Audrey Martin as Nana Mary
- Helena Gallagher as Amy

== Reception ==
Writing in Sydney Morning Herald Louise Rugendyke said it was "possibly the most perfect TV show of the year." Lauren Carroll Harris of ABCs The Screen Show called it a "mischievous, very tender, joyful comedy".

The NT Police Association expressed concerns about depictions of crimes committed and of the police themselves.

== Awards ==
- 9th AACTA Awards
  - Best Online Drama or Comedy - Dylan River, Tanith Glynn-Maloney, Meg O'Connell, Charlie Aspinwall - won
