= Sam Corlett =

Australian actor (born 1996)

- Born: 24 April 1996 (age 30); Central Coast, New South Wales, Australia
- Occupation: Actor
- Years active: 2018–present
- Notable work: Chilling Adventures of Sabrina; The Dry; Vikings: Valhalla; Territory

Sam Corlett (born 24 April 1996) is an Australian actor who has appeared as Caliban in Chilling Adventures of Sabrina, Young Luke in The Dry (both 2020), Leif Erikson in Vikings: Valhalla (2022–2024) and Marshall Lawson in Territory (2024).

== Early life and education ==
Corlett was born and raised on the Central Coast, New South Wales, Australia, with his parents being a counsellor and a tradesman. He was a professional model before he became an actor, working for Viviens Models. Corlett also had a high level involvement in sport growing up; he was captain of his school team at both rugby and basketball.

== Career ==
In 2020, Corlett secured a recurring role as Caliban (Prince of Hell) for 14 episodes of Chilling Adventures of Sabrina opposite Kiernan Shipka, which was filmed in Vancouver, Canada.

Corlett plays the main role as Leif Erikson in History's Vikings sequel Vikings: Valhalla, which aired on Netflix in 2022. Corlett teams up with Leo Suter who plays Harald Sigurdsson and Frida Gustavsson as Freydís Eiríksdóttir in the Viking saga, set in a time over a century after the Lothbrok era. Eriksson was believed to be one of the first Europeans to explore North America.

In 2025, Corlett was nominated for a Logie award for his work on the Netflix series Territory.

== Personal life ==
Whilst filming Vikings: Valhalla at Ashford Studios in Wicklow, Ireland, Corlett started his working day with meditation, followed by a 7-kilometre (4.3 mi) run, then a swim in the Irish Sea and some weight training each evening. Corlett is a vegan; he gained around 10 kg (22 lb) in weight for the Valhalla role by eating a diet of stir-fries, containing bean sprouts, microgreens and kimchi, along with organic vegan protein, brown rice and peas. As Corlett was uncomfortable wearing real leather, he was provided with Desserto based body armour, a type of artificial leather made from cacti.

== Filmography ==
Television and film roles
Year	Title	Role	Notes
2020	Acting for a Cause	Mr. Bingley	Episode: "Pride and Prejudice"
2020	Chilling Adventures of Sabrina	Caliban	Recurring role (Parts 3–4); 14 episodes
2020	The Dry	Young Luke	Film debut
2022–2024	Vikings: Valhalla	Leif Erikson	Main role; 24 episodes
2024	He Ain't Heavy	Max	Film
2024	Territory	Marshall Lawson	Main role; miniseries
2026	Star Wars: Maul – Shadow Lord	Officer Reb	Voice role; 4 episodes
