= Sweet Country (2017 film) =

2017 Australian Western drama film

- Film poster
- Directed by: Warwick Thornton
- Written by: David Tranter; Steven McGregor
- Produced by: Greer Simpkin; David Jowsey; David Tranter
- Starring: Sam Neill; Bryan Brown; Hamilton Morris
- Cinematography: Warwick Thornton
- Edited by: Nick Meyers
- Production company: Bunya Productions
- Release dates: 6 September 2017 (Venice); 25 January 2018 (Australia)
- Running time: 113 minutes
- Country: Australia
- Languages: English; Arrernte

Sweet Country is a 2017 Australian revisionist Western drama film, directed by Warwick Thornton. Set in 1929 in the sparsely populated outback of Central Australia (before the formation of the Northern Territory) and based on a series of true events, it tells a harsh story against the backdrop of a divided society (between the Anglo-Celtic Australians and Indigenous Australians) during the interwar period in Australia.

It was first screened in the main competition section of the 74th Venice International Film Festival in September 2017 and after winning the Special Jury Prize award there, went on to win several awards internationally.

== Plot ==
Sam Kelly is a middle-aged Aboriginal Australian stockman and station hand in the outback of Central Australia some time after the end of the First World War. His employer, Fred Smith, a kind preacher and grazier, agrees to lend Sam, his wife, Lizzie, and his niece, Lucy, to a bitter, abusive and alcoholic ANZAC veteran named Harry March on a neighbouring station to renovate the latter's paddock fences. After sending Sam out to round up some cattle, Harry rapes Lizzie before he threatens to flay her and Sam as well as rape Lucy if Lizzie tells Sam. Sam's relationship with Harry quickly deteriorates.

Later, Harry visits the station on which Sam works, looking for a runaway Aboriginal youth named Philomac, who had escaped after Harry had chained him up to stop him from stealing. Harry fires rifle shots into the house then kicks in the door, leading Sam (who is inside with Lizzie) to pick up a shotgun and kill Harry in self-defence.

Sam goes on the run from the law, setting out with Lizzie across deserts in the outback. The manhunt for Sam is led by Sergeant Fletcher, who has to contend with the searing heat, venomous animals and Aboriginal warriors. Eventually Sam and Lizzie return to turn themselves in, while Fletcher has a gallows constructed and tries to influence the judge who comes to the town to conduct the trial. More details emerge and Sam is acquitted. As he leaves the town in a horse and cart, he is killed by a sniper.

== Cast ==
- Hamilton Morris as Sam Kelly
- Sam Neill as Fred Smith
- Bryan Brown as Sergeant Fletcher
- Thomas M. Wright as Mick Kennedy
- Matt Day as Judge Taylor
- Ewen Leslie as Harry March
- Natassia Gorey-Furber as Lizzie Kelly
- Gibson John as Archie
- Anni Finsterer as Nell
- Shanica Cole as Lucy
- Tremayne and Trevon Doolan as Philomac
- Luka Magdeline Cole as Olive

== Production ==
=== Background ===
The storyline of the film was inspired by the true story of an Aboriginal Australian man named Wilaberta (or Wilberta or Willaberta) Jack in 1929 and his shooting of ANZAC veteran Harry Henty. Scriptwriter and sound recordist for the film, David Tranter, had previously directed and been responsible for sound recording on a documentary short film of the story, titled Willaberta Jack, which had been nominated for Best Documentary in the Winnipeg Aboriginal Film Festival in 2007. Willaberta Jack was Tranter's great-uncle, elder brother of his grandfather Philomac, and they lived north of Alice Springs.

Tranter recalls:

Then I was in the Tiwi Islands with Steve McGregor and Murray Lui working on a film as the sound recordist. After the shoot we went back to the house and had a cup of tea and Murray said that Willaberta Jack story, that would make a great movie. And I said yeah – but I'm not a writer. But I wanted to try so I went and bought myself a couple of sketch books, and I started drawing the story in pictures and it took me about two weeks. Then I sat down with Stephen Cleary who helped me type it up into a treatment. I took it to the Ignite Screenwriting workshop and they helped me get 128 pages written in four days. I was real proud of myself. In the end we did three drafts and I sent each draft to David Jowsey and Steven Mcgregor, and Steven was the one who got the script to the point of making it.

=== Filming ===
The film was shot largely at Ooraminna Station, a cattle station about 40 kilometres (25 mi) south of Alice Springs in the Northern Territory, not far from the Simpson Desert. A town built on the station for the film The Drover's Wife: The Legend of Molly Johnson (directed by Leah Purcell), which included a police station and general store, was used for the town scenes. Many cast members were Aboriginal Australians and locals from Alice Springs were employed as extras.

=== Other crew and studio ===
The film was produced by Greer Simpkin and David Jowsey, through Bunya Productions. It was co-produced by David Tranter.

David Tranter, Thom Kellar, Sam Gain-Emery, and Will Sheridan were responsible for the sound recording of the film, Nick Meyers was film editor.

== Themes and genre ==
The film is an example of the "meat pie Western", a name used to describe Western films set in the arid Australian outback, although set in more recent times than most in the genre, and rather than tell a simple narrative, it also exposes severe racism unapologetically. One reviewer muses on the label "neo-Western", which invokes a very old genre (including the classic Western doomed hero character) as well as a "sense of newness and revival".

Set in outback Central Australia about ten years after World War I, rather than the earlier British colonial or pre-federation period of Australia's history of many traditional westerns, the film deals with the effects of the First World War on its white inhabitants, the extreme racism and forced labour which existed at that time along with how Aboriginal Australian and Torres Strait Islander workers were used to build the country, as well as personal morality. It also shows a world where women have little power. Fred is a white character who shows kindness and morality, but even the worst villain (Harry) is also shown as a victim of life in the trenches of the war, who has returned damaged. The film is more than just a story or period piece; it aims to help Australians to understand their history and its legacy in the present time.

Cinematography is an essential element of the film, as the story plays out against the bold visual background.

== Sequel ==
A sequel film, Wolfram, also directed by Thornton and reprising several of the roles and actors from Sweet Country, premiered on the closing night of the Adelaide Film Festival on 26 October 2025.

== Reception ==
Sweet Country was well received by critics and audiences alike, winning the Audience Award at the 2017 Adelaide Film Festival.

On review aggregator website Rotten Tomatoes, the film holds an approval rating of 96% based on 91 reviews, with an average rating of 8.21/10. The website's critical consensus reads, "Sweet Country makes brilliant use of the Australian outback as the setting for a hard-hitting story that satisfies as a character study as well as a sociopolitical statement". On Metacritic, the film has a weighted average score of 87 out of 100, based on 21 critics, indicating "universal acclaim".

It received positive reviews from many reviewers, with one calling it Thornton's second masterpiece, and one of the best Westerns and Australian films of the century.

=== Film festivals and awards ===
Sweet Country premiered at the 74th Venice Film Festival on 6 September 2017, where it won the Special Jury Prize award. Shown in the Platform section at the 2017 Toronto International Film Festival, it won the Platform Prize. It won the Audience Award at the 2017 Adelaide Film Festival and the Best Feature Film at the 2017 Asia Pacific Screen Awards.

=== Accolades ===
Award	Category	Subject	Result
AACTA Awards (8th)	Best Film	David Jowsey	Won
AACTA Awards (8th)	Best Film	Greer Simpkin	Won
AACTA Awards (8th)	Best Direction	Warwick Thornton	Won
AACTA Awards (8th)	Best Original Screenplay	Steven McGregor	Won
AACTA Awards (8th)	Best Original Screenplay	David Tranter	Won
AACTA Awards (8th)	Best Actor	Hamilton Morris	Won
AACTA Awards (8th)	Best Supporting Actress	Natassia Gorey-Furber	Nominated
AACTA Awards (8th)	Best Cinematography	Warwick Thornton	Won
AACTA Awards (8th)	Best Editing	Nick Meyers	Won
AACTA Awards (8th)	Best Sound	Sam Gain-Emery	Nominated
AACTA Awards (8th)	Best Sound	Thom Kellar	Nominated
AACTA Awards (8th)	Best Sound	Will Sheridan	Nominated
AACTA Awards (8th)	Best Sound	David Tranter	Nominated
AACTA Awards (8th)	Best Costume Design	Heather Wallace	Nominated
AACTA International Awards (8th)	Best Direction	Warwick Thornton	Nominated
Adelaide Film Festival (2017)	Best Feature	Warwick Thornton	Won
