= Dylan River =

Australian film director, writer, and cinematographer

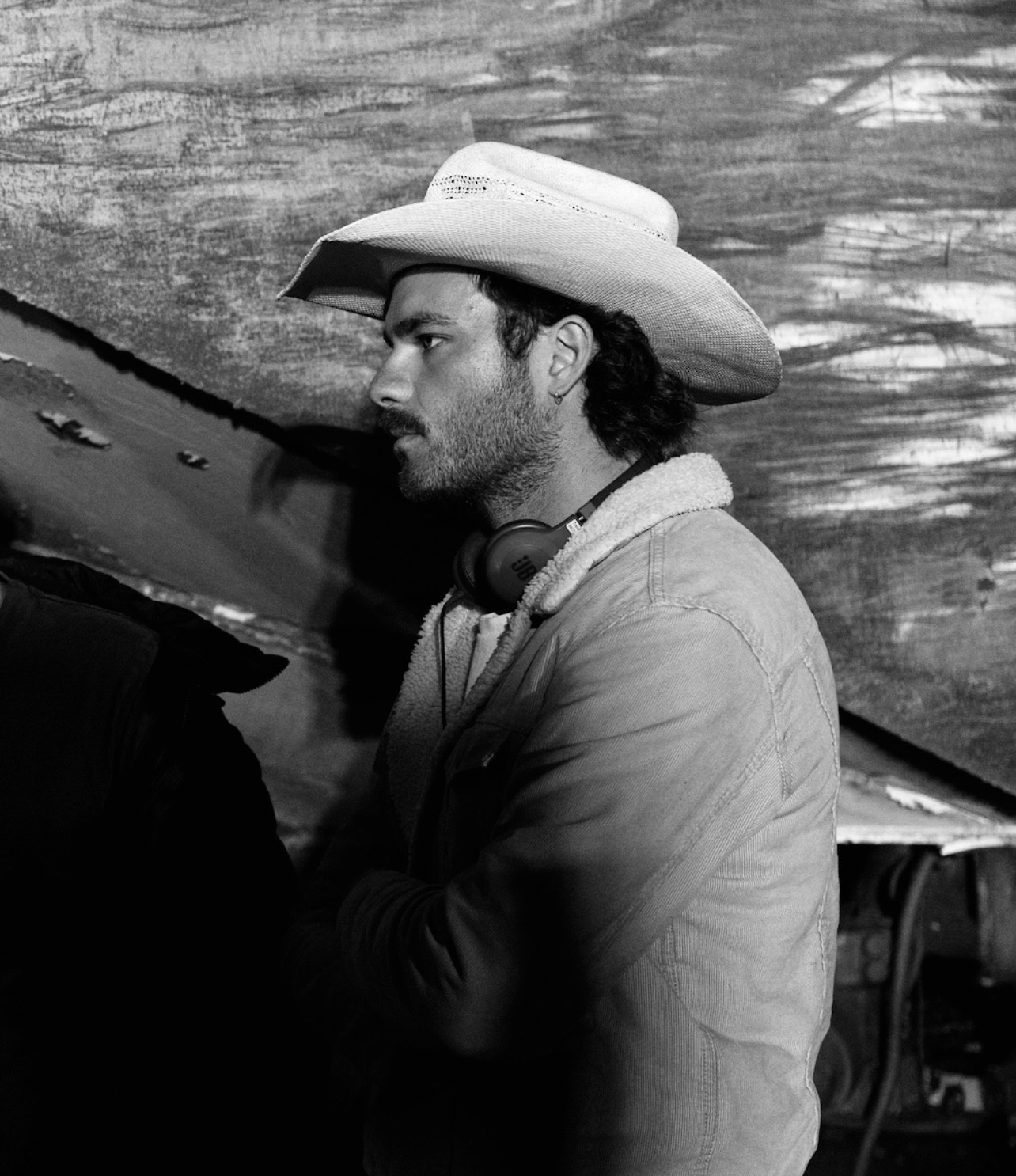
- Born: 1992 (age 32–33); Alice Springs, Northern Territory, Australia
- Occupations: Director, writer, cinematographer
- Years active: 2013–present
- Notable work: Robbie Hood (2019); The Beach (2020); Mystery Road: Origin (2022); Thou Shalt Not Steal (2024)

Dylan River (born 1992), also credited as Dylan River Glynn McDonald, is an Australian film director, writer, and cinematographer. He co-wrote and directed the series Robbie Hood in 2019, and is known for his as cinematographer on the 2020 series The Beach, documenting his father, Warwick Thornton. He also wrote and directed episodes of the prequel TV series Mystery Road: Origin (2022), and in 2024 is co-creator and director of Thou Shalt Not Steal.

== Early life and family ==
Dylan River was born in 1992 in Alice Springs, Northern Territory. His father, Warwick Thornton, is a filmmaker and his mother, Penelope McDonald, is a producer, screenwriter, and director. He is the grandson of Freda Glynn, the co-founder of CAAMA.

== Career ==
River's work includes writing, direction and cinematography.

In 2013, his debut feature documentary, Buckskin, about Kaurna educator Jack Buckskin, won the Foxtel Australian Documentary Prize. It is available on SBS on Demand.

In 2017, River (credited as Dylan River Glynn McDonald) directed a short documentary film about actor and musician Tom E. Lewis, called Finding Maawirrangga. The film was written by Lewis, produced by Julia Morris, and executive produced by Lewis' wife Fleur Parry. Itnd screened at the 2017 Sydney Film Festival and 2018 Flickerfest. Not long after Lewis' death in May 2018, the film screened at the inaugural Northern Territory Travelling Film festival in June of that year. The film tells of Lewis' return to his grandmother's country to learn his songlines, and in it he also relates how he contravened some cultural norms on stage.

In 2019, River co-created (with Tanith Glynn-Maloney), co-wrote (with Kodie Bedford), and directed Robbie Hood, a six-part series of 10-minute episodes, which was widely praised. Pedrea Jackson stars as Robbie, a young teenager with a kind heart, who goes around Alice Springs with his two friends "borrowing heavily" from the rich to help his family and friends. It had its world premiere at Canneseries The series won an AACTA Award for Best Online Comedy or Drama and a Screen Producers Australia Award for Online Series Production of the Year. The production company, Ludo Studio, producers of Bluey, also won another major SPA Award for their business. All episodes became available on SBS on Demand on 5 July, while the series first aired on SBS Viceland on 9 July, and aired on NITV on 11 November 2019.

He directed the 2022 six-part prequel series Mystery Road: Origin, and co-wrote several episodes.

Over some of the 10 years leading up to its release in June 2023, River worked with his mother, Penelope McDonald, as co-writer and cinematographer on the feature-length documentary film Audrey Napanangka, about a Warlpiri woman and her partner, Santos, who have raised many children in the Central Desert. The film's locations included Mparntwe (Alice Springs), Yuendumu, and Mount Theo (Purturlu), Audrey's country, and it was co-produced by Trisha Morton-Thomas and Rachel Clements. Rona Glynn-McDonald (founder of not-for-profit Common Ground) was executive producer of the film.

In 2024 River co-created (with Tanith Glynn-Maloney) and directed a Stan Original series, Thou Shalt Not Steal. Shot in South Australia and the Northern Territory, the road trip comedy drama series stars Noah Taylor, Miranda Otto, Will McDonald, and Sherry-Lee Watson. It premiered on 17 October 2024 on Stan in Australia.

== Filmography ==
Year	Title	Contribution	Note
2022	Mystery Road: Origin	Director and writer	TV series
2020	A Sunburnt Christmas	Cinematographer	Feature film
2020	The Beach	Cinematographer	6 episodes
2019	Robbie Hood	Director and writer	6 episodes
2019	The Australian Dream	Cinematographer	Documentary
2018	Finke: There and Back	Director, writer and cinematographer	Documentary
2018	Ward One	Director and writer	Short film
2017	Sweet Country	Second unit director	Feature film
2017	Coat of Arms	Director and writer	Short film
2017	Finding Mawiranga	Director and cinematographer	Documentary
2017	Blasko	Cinematographer	Documentary
2017	We Don't Need a Map	Cinematographer	Documentary
2016	Black Comedy	Writer	1 episode
2015	Black Chook	Director	Short film
2015	Nulla Nulla	Director, writer and composer	Short film
2014	Who We Are: Brave New Clan	Cinematographer	Documentary
2014	Talking Language with Ernie Dingo	Cinematographer	Documentary
2013	Buckskin	Director and composer	Documentary
2023	Audrey Napanangka	Co-writer, cinematographer	Documentary
2024	Thou Shalt Not Steal	Director	Comedy series

== Awards and nominations ==
Year	Result	Award	Category	Work	Ref.
2021	Won	AACTA Awards	Best Cinematography in a Documentary	The Beach: Too Mad Too Shy	
2021	Nominated	AACTA Awards	Best Cinematography in Television	A Sunburnt Christmas	
2019	Won	AACTA Awards	Best Online Drama or Comedy	Robbie Hood	
2019	Nominated	AACTA Awards	Special Commendation	Finke: There and Back	
2018	Nominated	Film Critics Circle of Australia	Best Cinematography	Sweet Country	
2017	Nominated	Camerimage	Main Competition	Sweet Country	
2017	Nominated	Asia Pacific Screen Awards	Achievement in Cinematography	Sweet Country	
2015	Nominated	Berlin International Film Festival	Best Short Film	Nulla Nulla	
2015	Won	AACTA Awards	Best Short Film	Nulla Nulla	

=== ARIA Music Awards ===
The ARIA Music Awards is an annual awards ceremony that recognises excellence, innovation, and achievement across all genres of Australian music. They commenced in 1987.

Year	Nominee / work	Award	Result	Ref.
2019	Dylan River for Briggs (featuring Greg Holden) - "Life Is Incredible"	Best Video	Nominated	
