= Art + soul =

Indigenous Australian cultural project

art + soul is an Australian cultural project, led by curator Hetti Perkins, that aims to convey the diversity and complexity of Indigenous Australian expression.

The project spans three mediums: an ABC Television documentary series, an exhibition at the Art Gallery of NSW, and an accompanying book published by the Miegunyah Press.

The three-part documentary was directed by Warwick Thornton, and first aired on ABC Television on 7 October 2010. Each part explores Aboriginal and Torres Strait Islander art, culture, and heritage, according to a certain theme: home + away; dreams + nightmares; and bitter + sweet.

== Exhibition ==
The art + soul exhibition ran from 28 August 2010 until 13 June 2011 in the Yiribana gallery at the Art Gallery of NSW. It featured works from the gallery's own Aboriginal art collection.

== Book ==
The art + soul book was published by the Miegunyah Press, and released to coincide with the exhibition and series.
