= Hamilton Morris (actor) =

Australian actor

Hamilton Morris is an Australian actor. He is a Warlpiri man from the small community of Nyirripi, Northern Territory. He won the 2018 AACTA Award for Best Actor in a Leading Role for his role in the drama film Sweet Country. In 2015, he appeared in two episodes of the comedy television series 8MMM Aboriginal Radio. In 2024, he played Uncle Bryce in the neo-Western drama series Territory.
