= Steven McGregor =

Australian filmmaker

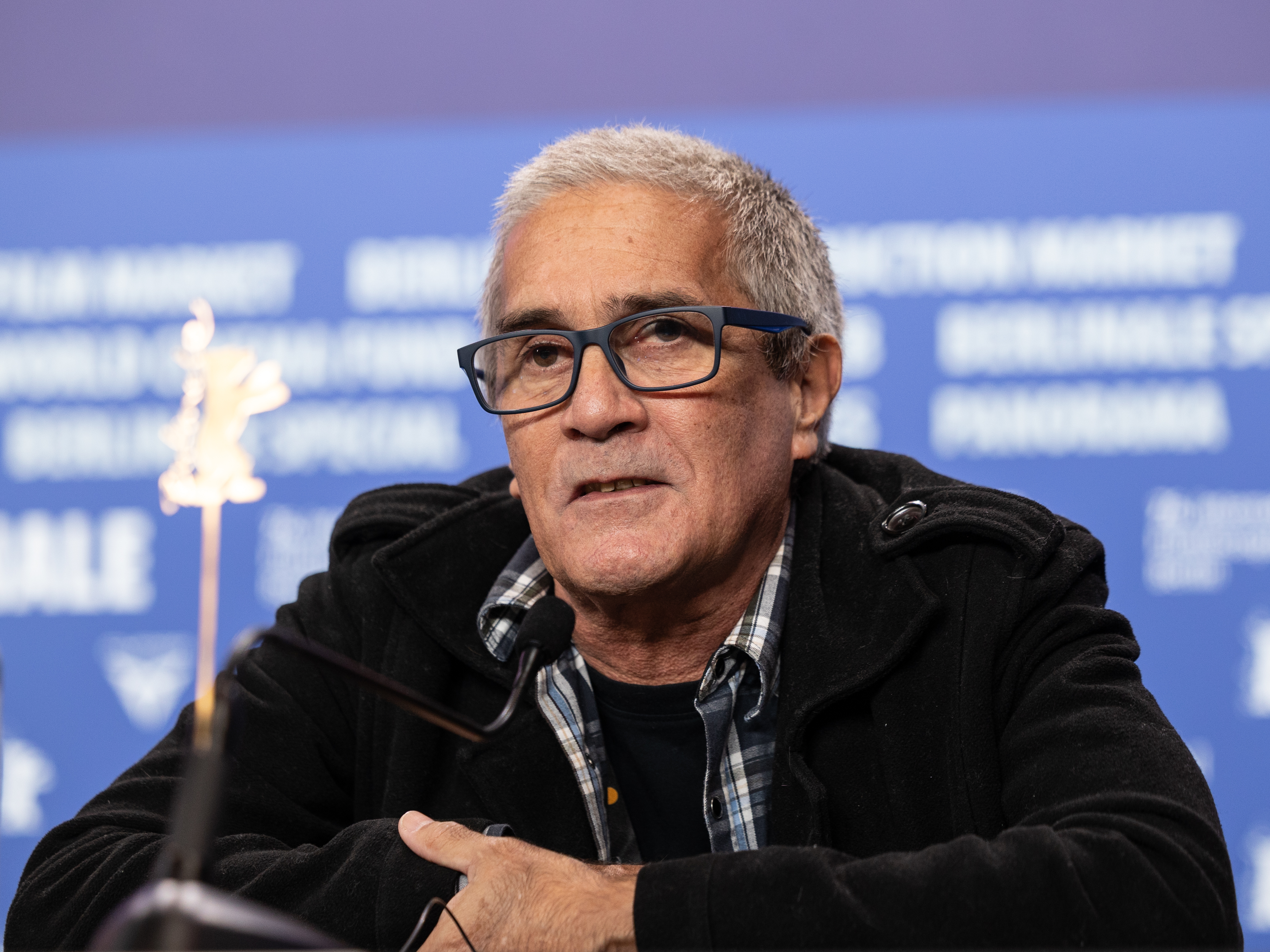
- McGregor in 2026
- Born: Darwin, Northern Territory, Australia
- Occupation: Filmmaker
- Years active: c.1995–present
- Known for: Redfern Now, Sweet Country, Fires

Steven McGregor is an Australian filmmaker, known for his work on Redfern Now, Black Comedy, Sweet Country, and numerous documentaries, including My Brother Vinnie. He has collaborated with David Tranter on writing several screenplays.

== Early life and education ==
McGregor grew up near the leprosarium in East Arm, a suburb of Darwin, in the Northern Territory. His mother, who had grown up on a mission, was a healthworker at the leprosarium until its closure around 1970. He and his siblings used to hang out there to use the swimming pool and play. He said there was no real stigma attached to it, and the people with leprosy were fairly happy, but missed their family and homes.

He was always fascinated by black and white photographs. The film Papillon (1973) caught his imagination as a child.

He completed a Masters in Drama Directing at Australian Film, Television and Radio School in Sydney.

McGregor lost an eye at the age of 25 when he was hit in the head with a hockey stick when playing a game of hockey.

== Career ==
McGregor began his career as a production assistant in the Northern Territory Chief Minister's media unit in Darwin, where he worked for six years. His next job was as a cameraman for Imparja Television in Alice Springs. His first major documentary was about Australian rules football in the mid-1990s, for Channel 7.

After losing his eye at the age of 25, he had to change from camera work. CAAMA offered him a job, while he undertook a traineeship there in writing and directing. At CAAMA he met Warwick Thornton, Erica Glynn, Beck Cole, and many others.

Since the mid-1990s, McGregor has written, directed, and produced many documentaries, as well as fictional feature films, TV dramas, and comedy series. His varied work includes Arafura Pearl (2003), a documentary about Aboriginal leader Kathy Mills; Redfern Now (writing); Blue Water Empire, a documentary series about the Torres Strait Islands; and Black Comedy (directing). He co-wrote Sweet Country with David Tranter. He worked on a documentary about Archie Roach in 1999.

In 2006 he directed My Brother Vinnie, a short documentary film about actor Aaron Pedersen and his brother. Written by Pedersen, and shot by Warwick Thornton (who had grown up with Pedersen), it was selected for the Melbourne International Film Festival and Message Sticks Indigenous Film Festival.

Around 2007 McGregor worked with Baz Luhrmann as a script consultant on his feature film Australia.

Croker Island Exodus (2012), directed and co-written by McGregor (co-written by Danielle MacLean, tells the story of the rescue of 95 Aboriginal children who travelled from north Australia in 1942 with their missionary carers to safety across the continent to Sydney. They left Croker Island after the Japanese were bombing northern Australia during World War II. He cast locals to play all the roles.

His 2016 documentary, Servant or Slave, brought to life accounts of Indigenous Australian history, based on the first-hand experiences of five Aboriginal women, members of the Stolen Generation, whose stories were recorded by Hetti Perkins and Mitch Stanley.

It was screened at the Antenna Documentary Film Festival, The film won the Audience Choice Award at Antenna and was also selected to screen at the Melbourne International Film Festival. The film was shown on NITV.

McGregor was co-director (with Erica Glynn) and co-writer on the 2022 SBS Television drama miniseries True Colours.

McGregor was a co-writer on the 2024 Netflix series Territory.

He again teamed with David Tranter to co-write the script for Wolfram, Warwick Thornton's follow-up to Sweet Country.

== Recognition and awards ==
McGregor has been nominated for numerous and won several awards for his work on a number of films and television series, some of which are listed below:

- 2003: Nominated in two categories, AFI Awards, for Cold Turkey
- 2013: Winner, AACTA Award for Best Screenplay in Television, for Redfern Now
- 2015: Nominated, AWGIE for Best Original Telemovie
- 2015: Winner, AACTA Award for Best Children's Television Series, for Ready for This (co-writer)
- 2016: Winner, Logie Award for Most Outstanding Children's Program, for Ready for This (co-writer)
- 2018: Winner, AACTA Award, Best Screenplay, for Sweet Country (shared with David Tranter)
- 2019: Winner, Kate Challis RAKA Award, for Sweet Country (shared with David Tranter)
- 2020: Nominated, Capricornia Film Awards, Best Broadcast Documentary, for Looky Looky Here Comes Cooky
- 2020: Nominated, AACTA Awards, Best Documentary, for Looky Looky Here Comes Cooky
- 2021: Winner, AIDC Award, Best Documentary / Factual Single, for Looky Looky Here Comes Cooky
- 2021: Winner, AACTA Award for Best Telefeature or Mini Series, for Fires (co-writer)
- 2022: Winner, Logie Award for Most Outstanding Miniseries or Telemovie, for Fires, (co-writer)

=== Steve McGregor Award for Best Emerging Talent ===
The Steve McGregor Award for Best Emerging Talent in Film/Television was inaugurated at the National Remote Indigenous Media Festival in 2009. The inaugural winner was Bernard Namok Jnr, who worked for the Top End Aboriginal Bush Broadcasting Association (TEABBA).
