= Beck Cole =

Australian film producer

- Born: Australia
- Occupation(s): Screenwriter, film director
- Years active: 2000–present
- Partner: Samuel Paynter (2016–c.2017)
- Children: 1

Beck Cole is an Australian filmmaker of the Warramungu and Luritja nations. She is known for her work on numerous TV series, including First Australians, Grace Beside Me, Black Comedy and Wentworth, as well as documentaries and short films. She is based in Alice Springs, in the Northern Territory.

== Early life, education and early career ==
Cole grew up in Adelaide and around the Port Adelaide area.

Cole started working in media as a journalist when she got a cadetship at Imparja Television, when still at school. She gained experience in both writing and presenting stories, and also worked as a news and weather presenter.

She graduated from Charles Sturt University with a BA in Communication and Sociology, and soon afterwards started work in the Indigenous Unit at ABC Television, where she started her filmmaking career. In 2001, Cole graduated with a Master of Arts (Film & Television) Documentary from the Australian Film Television and Radio School (AFTRS), where she was exposed to a number of Australian documentary filmmakers.

Cole was mentored by photographer and filmmaker Michael Riley, who co-founded Boomalli Aboriginal Artists Cooperative, until his death in 2004.

== Career ==
While at AFTRS, Cole worked on and off for the Central Australian Aboriginal Media Association (CAAMA), with whom she has had an association ever since.

Her early short documentary and drama films were mainly focused on Aboriginal culture and family, including Flat (2002; co-produced by Rachel Perkins and Darren Dale) and Plains Empty (2005) premiered at Sundance, and Flat also screened at the Edinburgh Film Festival.

Cole established a working as well as a personal relationship with cinematographer Warwick Thornton, and along with producer Kath Shelper they called themselves "the trinity" since working together from 2004. Wirriya: Small Boy (2004) is a short film about an eight-year-old boy who lives in Hidden Valley, an Indigenous town camp near Alice Springs in the Northern Territory, with his foster mother.

Cole worked as a writer-director on First Australians (2008), the acclaimed documentary television series about the history of Indigenous Australians, along with Rachel Perkins and Louis Nowra.

In 2009 she wrote and directed Making 'Samson and Delilah', a 55 minute documentary on the making of the feature film Samson and Delilah, directed by Thornton.

Her debut feature film was the drama Here I Am (2011), which stars prominent activist and academic Marcia Langton.

She directed several episodes over three series of the Black Comedy, which won a 2015 AACTA award for Best Direction in a Light Entertainment or Reality Series.

After working on a number of series on Indigenous themes, she collaborated with Leah Purcell on several episodes of the popular prison drama series, Wentworth, between 2019 and 2021, and with Bevan Lee on the Seven Network series Between Two Worlds, which premiered in 2020.

Cole was voice director for all three seasons of Little J & Big Cuz, and wrote two episodes of the series.

As of 2019 Cole was working on a horror film set in Alice Springs, based on a true story told by Aboriginal children who lived in a residential care home, where they were attacked by an evil entity.

Cole and Sam Paynter workshopped ideas with local elders and young people to produce ideas for the storyline of the 2020 children's TV series Thalu, which was commissioned by National Indigenous Television and ABC Me. She also co-wrote the screenplay for the series along with Paynter, Nayuka Gorrie, David Woodhead, and Donald Imberlong.

Cole directed one of the segments of the anthology film We Are Still Here, which premiered as the opening film of the 2022 Sydney Film Festival.

== Other activities ==
In 2020 Cole was co-presenter, with Warwick Thornton, of a five-day development workshop called the Aboriginal Short Film Initiative, held at South Australian Film Corporation's Adelaide Studios.

== Recognition and accolades ==
Cole was one of seven filmmakers featured in the 5th Asia Pacific Triennial of Contemporary Art at the Gallery of Modern Art (GoMA) in Brisbane

=== Film awards ===
- Wirriya: Small Boy (2004): winner of best film at Women on Women Film Festival in Sydney and the Jury Award for Best Short Documentary at ImagineNative Film + Media Arts Festival
- Here I Am (2011): winner of Best Dramatic Feature at the ImagineNative Film + Media Arts Festival; nominated for the International Feature award at the 2011 Adelaide Film Festival; in competition for the Golden Zenith Award at the Montréal World Film Festival and
- Black Comedy: winner, 2015 AACTA Award for Best Direction in a Light Entertainment or Reality Series

== Personal life ==
Cole was formerly married to director Warwick Thornton, whom she met in 1999. They have a daughter. The couple shared a personal as well as professional relationship. By 2018 Thornton and Cole had separated.

She is a cousin of filmmaker Danielle MacLean.
