= Hetti Perkins =

Aboriginal Australian art curator and writer (born 1965)

- Born: 1965 (age 60–61)
- Other name: Hetti Kemerre Perkins
- Occupation: Art curator
- Years active: 1987–
- Known for: art + soul (2010)

Hetti Kemerre Perkins (born 1965) is an Aboriginal Australian art curator and writer. She is known for her work at the Art Gallery of New South Wales, where she was the senior curator of Aboriginal and Torres Strait Islander art at the gallery from around 1998 until 2011, and for many significant exhibitions and projects.

== Early life and education ==
Hetti Kemerre Perkins is an Eastern Arrernte and Kalkadoon woman from Central Australia. She was born in 1965, the daughter of Aboriginal Australian activist Charles Perkins and his wife Eileen Munchenberg. Hetti is a granddaughter of Hetty Perkins; sister to film director Rachel Perkins and brother Adam Perkins. Her mother created an art gallery showcasing Aboriginal art in the family home's garage in Canberra, and she was influenced by her father's Indigenous rights advocacy. She attended the establishment of the Aboriginal Tent Embassy in 1972.

She attended Melrose High School in Canberra, with her sister.

Perkins completed a Bachelor of Arts degree in 1986.

== Career ==
Perkins started her career working at Aboriginal Arts Australia, an art gallery in Sydney. As part of her work there, she worked with independent Aboriginal artists as well as community art centres in remote areas. In 1988, she went to New York with the Dreamings: Art of Aboriginal Australia exhibition.

She was then appointed curator at the Boomalli Aboriginal Artists Cooperative in Sydney, where she was responsible for the expansion of its premises and raising of its profile. Under her curatorship, Boomalli mounted many exhibitions in Sydney and internationally, showcasing its members and other New South Wales artists.

She worked at the Art Gallery of New South Wales (AGNSW) in Sydney from 1989, was the senior curator of Aboriginal and Torres Strait Islander art at the gallery from around 1998 until 2011, when she resigned. She was responsible for some major exhibitions and initiatives during her time there. Perkins helped to the Yiribana Gallery at AGNSW, which opened in 1994. In 1991, she curated the Aboriginal Womens Exhibition, which included a national tour. In 1997, she co-curated the Australian entry for the 1997 Venice Biennale (along with Brenda L. Croft and Victoria Lynn), which featured the work of Emily Kame Kngwarreye, Yvonne Koolmatrie, and Judy Watson.

In 2010, she was curatorial adviser to "Eora Journey", the City of Sydney's Indigenous public art program.

Also in 2010, she curated the project art + soul: a journey into the world of Aboriginal art, which included a significant exhibition at AGNSW, a book, and a three-part television documentary made by ABC Television. This was aired in October 2010, and later shown on Sveriges Television as "Aborginernas konst".

Perkins was curator of the NPG's fourth National Indigenous Art Triennial: Ceremony (26 March–31 July 2022). in 2022.

As of 2022, Perkins is described as "senior curator-at-large" of the NPG.

In September 2022, she co-curated the 31st Desert Mob exhibition, held by Desart at the Iltja Ntjarra Many Hands Art Centre in Mparntwe Alice Springs, along with assistant manager of the art centre, Marisa Maher. This was the first time that the exhibition had been curated by two Aboriginal women.

== Other activities ==
Perkins was a member of the International Selection Committee for the Biennale of Sydney in 2000.

She co-produced four series of Colour Theory for SBS/NITV, and co-curated the Australian Indigenous Art Commission at the Musee du quai Branly in Paris, France.

Perkins has served as a board member of several bodies, including the Visual Arts Board of the Australia Council, Museum of Contemporary Art Australia, and the Museum and Art Gallery of the Northern Territory. She has also worked with other federal government agencies, as well as community arts organisations, and local government on various initiatives featuring and advocating for Aboriginal and Torres Strait Islander visual arts.

== Recognition and honours ==
- 2011: Artist-in-residence for Bangarra Dance Theatre
- 2018: Awarded Australia Council Fellowship at the National Indigenous Arts Awards
- 2026: Red Ochre Award for Lifetime Achievement in Cultural Advocacy and Leadership

== Personal life ==
Perkins is the mother of actress and activist Madeleine Madden.

== Bibliography ==
- Yanada (New Moon). (1993) In association with the Boomalli Aboriginal Artists Cooperative. ISBN 9780733403699.
- True Colours: Aboriginal and Torres Strait Islander artists raise the flag. (1994) In association with the Boomalli Aboriginal Artists Cooperative. ISBN 9780646182117
- Papunya Tula: Genesis and Genius. (2000) Eds. Hetti Perkins and Hannah Fink. Art Gallery of NSW in association with Papunya Tula Artists. ISBN 0-7347-6310-7.
- Tradition Today: Indigenous art in Australia. (2004) ISBN 9780734763440
- Crossing Country: the alchemy of Western Arnhem Land art. (2004) ISBN 9780734763594.
- Contemporary Aboriginal Art: the Mollie Gowing Acquisition Fund. (2006) ISBN 9781741740035.
- One Sun One Moon: Aboriginal Art in Australia. (2007) Eds. Hetti Perkins and Margaret West. Sydney: Art Gallery of New South Wales. ISBN 978-0-7347-6360-0.
- Half light: Portraits from Black Australia. (2008) ISBN 9781741740332.
- Nganana Tjungurringanyi Tjukurrpa Nintintjakitja (We are here sharing our dreaming). (2009) In association with Papunya Tula Artists. ISBN 9780646518855.
- Art + Soul: a journey into the world of Aboriginal art. (2010) ISBN 9780522857634
