= Natassia Gorey-Furber =

Australian actress

Natassia Gorey-Furber is an Australian actress. She is a Central Arrente woman from Alice Springs. She was nominated for the 2018 AACTA Award for Best Actress in a Supporting Role for her role in Sweet Country.
