= Warwick Thornton =

Australian film director

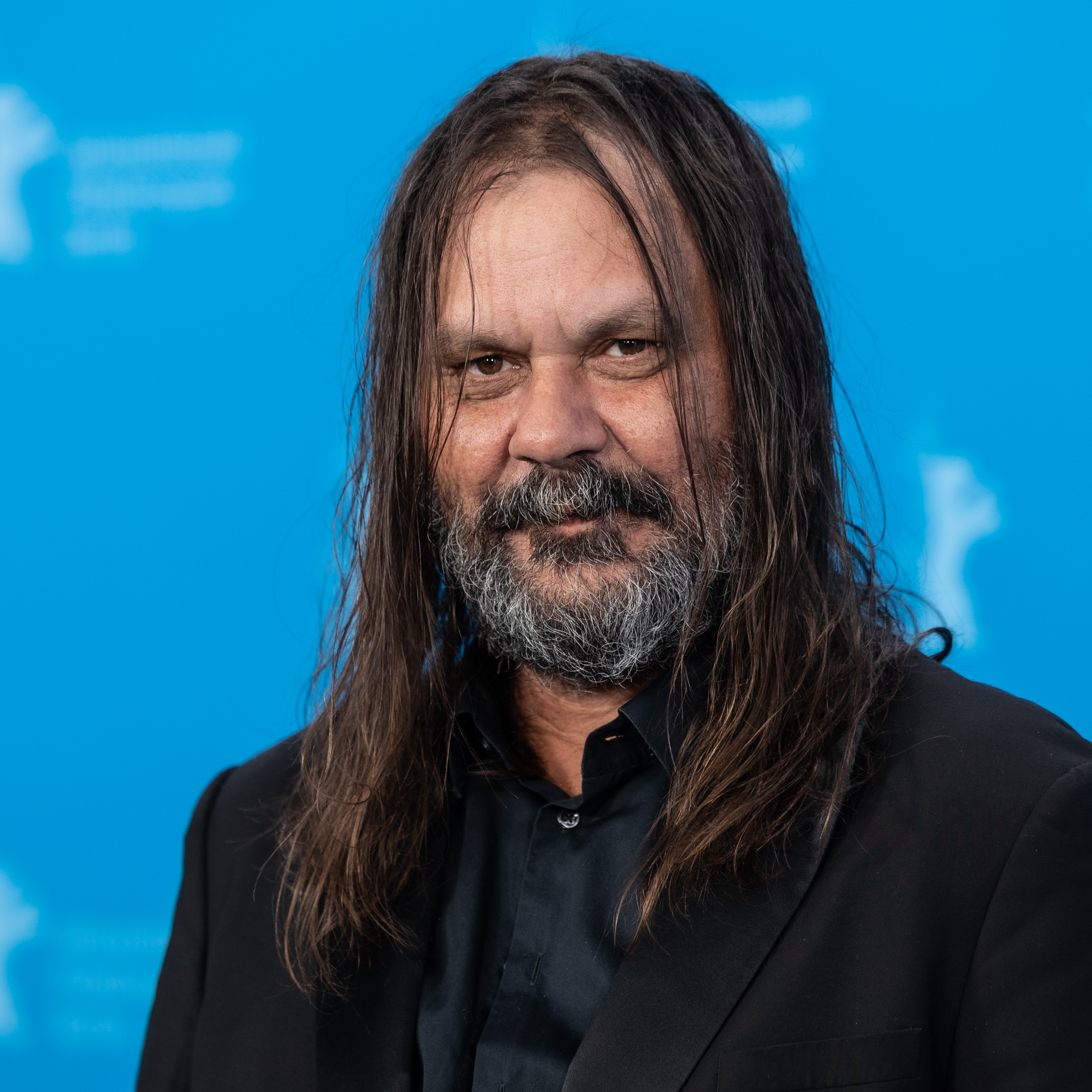
- Thornton in 2026
- Born: Alice Springs, Northern Territory, Australia
- Occupations: Film director, screenwriter, cinematographer
- Notable work: Samson and Delilah (2009); Sweet Country (2017)
- Partner: Beck Cole (1999–c.2017)
- Children: Dylan River, Luka Magdeline Cole, Rona Glynn-McDonald
- Mother: Freda Glynn
- Relatives: Erica Glynn (sister); Rona Glynn (aunt)

Warwick Thornton is an Aboriginal Australian film director, screenwriter, and cinematographer. His debut feature film Samson and Delilah won the Caméra d'Or at the 2009 Cannes Film Festival and the award for Best Film at the Asia Pacific Screen Awards. He also won the Asia Pacific Screen Award for Best Film in 2017 for Sweet Country. His latest film, Wolfram premiered at the Adelaide Film Festival on 26 October 2025.

== Early life and education ==
Warwick Thornton was born and raised in Alice Springs, the youngest of five children, including Erica Glynn. He is a Kaytetye man. His mother, Freda Glynn, co-founded and was the first director of the Central Australian Aboriginal Media Association (CAAMA) and was the director of Imparja Television for its first 10 years.

After Thornton rebelled in early adolescence, getting into trouble and riding motorbikes on the nearby claypans, at the age of 13 his mother sent him to boarding school, Salvado College, in Australia's only monastic town, New Norcia, Western Australia, although he later declared he became angry with Christianity and did not consider himself religious.

Returning to Alice Springs aged around 15, Thornton was employed as a DJ on Green Bush, a popular radio program run by CAAMA. It played music on request from prisoners, and broadcast to remote communities, also acting as a kind of bulletin board or open telephone line among listeners.

In the late 1980s, Thornton joined CAAMA's mobile video unit, which had been established in 1983 as a camera trainee, working alongside sound recordist David Tranter and filmmaker Rachel Perkins. The unit travelled to remote communities, "documenting vanishing worlds in real time".

Moving to Sydney in 1993 to study cinematography at the Australian Film, Television and Radio School.

== Career ==
Thornton began his career making short films and achieved success with them at film festivals around the world, including the short film Payback (1996) at the Telluride Film Festival, He directed and wrote From Sand to Celluloid – Payback (retitled simply Payback) under the auspices of the Indigenous Branch of the Australian Film Commission, with production by Blackfella Films. Rachel Perkins was line producer on the film. He then filmed the documentary Marn Grook: An Aboriginal Perspective on Australian Rules Football. Other films achieving international success were Green Bush (2005) and Nana, at the Berlin International Film Festival.

He describes his decision to become a filmmaker in an interview in 2007:

Where I grew up in Alice I was a DJ for a radio station (CAAMA). The station began a film unit and so I watched people pack cameras and equipment into cars and take off to make films. I was alone at the radio station and I thought that I really wanted to go with them. That's how it started, I made a film called Green Bush which is basically about that time. Eventually I went to AFTRS in Sydney and got really involved as a Director of Photography.

Thornton shared a personal as well as professional relationship with Beck Cole, and along with producer Kath Shelper called themselves "the trinity", working together from 2004.

In 2009 Thornton wrote, directed and shot his first feature film Samson & Delilah, which won awards including the Camera d’Or for best first feature film at the 2009 Cannes Film Festival. The following year he filmed the documentary series Art + Soul about Aboriginal and Torres Strait Islander artists, which was written and narrated by curator Hetti Perkins. The installation Mother Courage (inspired by Bertolt Brecht's 1939 character) was commissioned by dOCUMENTA and ACMI, and first exhibited in 2012.

His 2017 historical drama Sweet Country garnered critical acclaim and several awards, including the Special Jury Prize at the 74th Venice Film Festival; Platform Prize at the 2017 Toronto International Film Festival; the Audience Award at the 2017 Adelaide Film Festival; and the Best Feature Film at the 2017 Asia Pacific Screen Awards.

In 2020 he directed a six-part documentary series called The Beach (2020), about himself in isolation on a beach on the remote Dampier Peninsula. The film was shot by his son Dylan River.

Thornton directed a video used to advocate for the "Yes" campaign in the 2023 Australian Indigenous Voice referendum, a vote to change the Australian Constitution to enshrine a Voice to Parliament for Indigenous Australians. The video, using John Farnham's iconic 1986 song "You're the Voice" as a soundtrack, was released on 3 September 2023 and was rolled out on social and other digital media and television. In 2024, Thornton told Virginia Trioli, when he appeared as her guest in an episode of the series Creative Types, that he was working on a film that represented his anger at the result of the 2023 Voice referendum.

In 2025, Thornton worked with the Westerman Jilya Institute for Indigenous Mental Health, founded by psychologist Tracy Westerman, to make a film about Aboriginal mental health, for their initiative called "Change Direction", which was launched nationwide in the lead-up to National Reconciliation Week in May 2025. Actor Pedrea Jackson featured in the film.

His 2025 film, Wolfram, premiered on the closing night of the Adelaide Film Festival on 26 October 2025. Based on a real story and set in 1932, the film stars Deborah Mailman as a mother longing for the return of her stolen children. It is a sequel to Sweet Country, and features some of the same characters. Thornton served as director and cinematographer on the film. Wolfram looks at the exploitation of First Nations child labour.

In 2024, it was announced that Thornton had boarded a project to create a biopic about Aboriginal leader and warrior Pemulwuy, titled First Warrior, with Andrew Dillon (of That's‑A‑Wrap Productions) producing and co-writing with Jon Bell. Actors Sam Worthington and Jason Clarke, along with filmmakers Phillip Noyce, Stuart Beattie, and Shana Levine, are involved in the project. That's-A-Wrap Productions is an all-Indigenous film production company.

== Other activities ==
In 2020 Thornton was co-presenter, with Beck Cole, of a five-day development workshop called the Aboriginal Short Film Initiative, held at South Australian Film Corporation's Adelaide Studios.

== Family and personal life ==
Thornton's sister, Erica Glynn, is also a film writer and director.

Thornton was formerly married to filmmaker Beck Cole, whom he met in 1999. They have a daughter, Luka May, an actress also known as Luka Magdeline Cole or Luka May Glynn-Cole. The couple shared a personal as well as professional relationship (see above). By 2018 Thornton and Cole had separated.

Thornton also has a son, Dylan River, who is a filmmaker who has worked with his father.

He also has another daughter, Rona Glynn-McDonald, whose mother is producer Penelope McDonald, principal of Chili Films. Glynn-McDonald is the founding CEO of Common Ground, an organisation focused on reconciliation, and co-founder of First Nations Futures. In 2019 she filmed a series of short films called "Bedtime Stories", based on Dreamtime stories. The films were produced by her mother, while her father and brother also assisted. In the same year, she won the Diana Award for her work in "creating and sustaining positive change for Australia, primarily through sharing stories of First Nations people to a wide audience across Australia". As of 2024 Glynn-McDonald is in a relationship with AFL player and TV personality Tony Armstrong.

As of 2024 Thornton lives in Alice Springs.

== Filmography ==
=== Feature films ===
Year	Title	Notes
2009	Samson and Delilah	Also cinematographer
2013	The Darkside	Anthology film
2017	Sweet Country	Also cinematographer
2023	The New Boy	
2025	Wolfram	Also cinematographer

=== Short films ===
- Payback (1996)
- Mimi (2002)
- Green Bush (2005)
- Nana (2007)
- Words with Gods (2014), segment

=== Documentaries ===
- Willigan's Fitzroy (2000)
- The Old Man and the Inland Sea (2005)
- Burning Daylight (2007)
- Dark Science (2007), co-director
- Art + Soul (2010)
- We Don't Need a Map (2017)

=== Television ===
- Mystery Road (2020), series 2
- The Beach (2020), documentary series
- Firebite (2021)

=== As cinematographer ===
- Marn Grook: An Aboriginal Perspective on Australian Rules Football (1997), documentary
- Radiance (1998), feature film, directed by Rachel Perkins)
- Buried Country (2000), documentary, directed by Andy Nehl, based on the book by Clinton Walker
- Ngangkari Way (2001), documentary, directed by Erica Glynn
- Flat (2001), short film, directed by Beck Cole
- Mimi (2001), short film, directed by himself
- Kurtal: Snake Spirit (2002), documentary, co-cinematographer
- Queen of Hearts (2003), directed by Danielle MacLean
- Wirriya: Small Boy (2004), documentary, co-cinematographer, directed by Beck Cole
- Five Seasons (2005), documentary, directed by Steven McGregor
- The Lore of Love (2005), documentary, directed by Beck Cole
- My Brother Vinnie (2006), documentary, directed by Steven McGregor
- Plains Empty (2006), short film, directed by Beck Cole
- Green Bush (2005), short film, directed by himself
- First Australians (2006), television series, directed by Beck Cole & Rachel Perkins
- Here I Am (2011), feature film, directed by Beck Cole
- The Sapphires (2012), feature film, directed by Wayne Blair
- Fast Charlie (2023), feature film, directed by Phillip Noyce

== Recognition and awards ==
Critic David Stratton described Thornton as "one of our greatest filmmakers", while Cate Blanchett called him "the most brilliant visual storyteller".

Author and broadcaster Virginia Trioli wrote that Thornton's work is "driven by his emotional and intellectual response to the historical dispossession and contemporary despair of his people", using his films to tell stories with the minimum of dialogue.

In 2009, Thorton was named Northern Territorian of the Year

Year	Film	Award	Festival
2007	Nana	Melbourne Airport Award for Emerging Talent	Melbourne International Film Festival
2007	Nana	Best Short Film	Inside Film Awards (IF Awards)
2008	Nana	Best Short Film	Berlin International Film Festival
2009	Samson and Delilah	Caméra d'Or	Cannes Film Festival
2009	Samson and Delilah	Feature Film Screenplay (Original)	Australian Writers' Guild Award
2009	Samson and Delilah	Outstanding Achievement in Film	Deadly Awards
2009	Samson and Delilah	Best Director, Best Script and Best Music	Inside Film Awards
2009	Nana	Best Short Film Director	Inside Film Awards
2009	Samson and Delilah	Best Film	Asia Pacific Screen Awards
2009	Samson and Delilah	Best Director and Best Original Screenplay	AFI Awards
2009	Samson and Delilah	Best Music	Dinosaur Design IF Award
2009	Samson and Delilah	Award for Best Direction	National Film and Sound Archive IF Award
2017	Sweet Country	Best Film	Asia Pacific Screen Awards
2017	Sweet Country	Platform Prize	Toronto International Film Festival
