= Winnipeg Aboriginal Film Festival =

Annual film festival held in Canada

The Winnipeg Aboriginal Film Festival (WAFF) is an annual film festival in Winnipeg, Manitoba, Canada.

The festival programs a lineup of films related to First Nations, Métis, Inuit and other international indigenous peoples. Launched in 2002, the festival is staged annually at the city's Dramatic Arts Centre.

The event is a partner in the Adam Beach Film Institute, actor Adam Beach's Winnipeg-based film and media school for indigenous media arts students.

The Winnipeg Aboriginal Film Festival will celebrate its 21st anniversary in 2022. WAFF will host the 2nd annual National Indigenous Screen Awards in November 2022.
