= Elena Mandalis =

Australian actress

- Born: Melbourne, Victoria, Australia
- Education: Lauriston Girls' School
- Occupation: Actress
- Years active: 1993–present
- Spouse: Damien Fotiou

Elena Mandalis (Greek: Έλενα Μανδάλη, romanized: Élena Mandáli), also known as Elle Mandalis, is an Australian television, film and stage actress of Greek descent.

She is known for her roles in Ana Kokkinos' films Only the Brave (1994) and Head On (1998), both of which explore the lives of second generation Greek Australians in Melbourne.

== Career ==
Mandalis landed her first film role as co-lead, Alex in Ana Kokkinos' Only the Brave (1994), for which she won the Open Craft Award for her performance at the 1994 Australian Film Institute Awards. She played a troubled, second generation Greek Australian lesbian, and the film focused on her intense friendship with Vicki (Dora Kaskanis). Mandalis won the Open Craft Award for her performance at the 1994 Australian Film Institute Awards (later known as the AACTA Awards). The film was screened at film festivals around the world and won Best Film at the Melbourne International Film Festival in 1994.

In 1995, she guest starred in the ABC1 series, Correlli, with Hugh Jackman, in one of his earliest roles. In 1997, she landed a part as a series regular, playing DJ Sarah, alongside Dominic Purcell in the Australian Broadcasting Corporation series, Raw FM.

Mandalis reunited with Kokkinos for the celebrated drama film Head On (1998) and appeared alongside Alex Dimitriades, who played the lead role, Ari. Mandalis plays Betty, the female counterpart of Ari, in that they both rail against the conservative conventions of their Greek backgrounds and look to sex and drugs as an escape. The film, based on the 1995 novel Loaded by Christos Tsiolkas, received nine nominations at the 1998 Australian Film Institute Awards.

The following year she played Jett for 25 episodes in the Australian science fiction television series, Thunderstone. In 2000, she had a guest role in the Eric Bana-starring soap opera, Something in the Air on ABC1.

In 2001, Mandalis guest starred as Salea in Secret Life of Us. The show was broadcast on Network Ten and on Channel 4 in the UK. It followed the personal and professional lives of a group of twenty-somethings, including Claudia Karvan, living in the Melbourne neighbourhood of St Kilda.

In 2011, she had a recurring role in the fourth season of Network Ten police drama, Rush, alongside Rodger Corser. The following year she had a recurring role as Miss Papas in Tangle, with Ben Mendelsohn and Lincoln Younes.

In 2015, she appeared in Grant Scicluna's Australian drama film, Downriver, which premiered at the Melbourne International Film Festival. In the same year, she was chosen as reader for a selection of poetry by second generation Greek Australians on Radio National.

In 2018, Mandalis co-starred with Wayne Hope and Robyn Nevin in the ABC1 comedy series, Very Small Business.

In 2021, she was directed by Ana Kokkinos in the ABC TV anthology drama series, Fires. The series is set against the background of the 2019–20 Australian bushfire season.

In 2022, she starred in the Australian dark comedy thriller, Slant. Her role was written especially for her.

Mandalis is part of the ensemble cast of the Hobart-set ABC series, Bay of Fires, with Marta Dusseldorp, which premiered in 2023. She also plays Connie, part of the jury in the second season of legal drama series, The Twelve on Fox Showcase, with Sam Neill.

== Filmography ==
=== Film ===
Year	Title	Role	Notes
1994	Only the Brave	Alex	Dir. Ana Kokkinos; Open Craft Award (for performance) - 1994 Australian Film Institute Awards
1998	Head On	Betty	Dir. Ana Kokkinos
2003	The Forest	Tanya	Short film Dir. Jo Kennedy
2004	Heartworm	Rachaele	Short film Dir. Ben Chessell
2009	One Night	Antigone	Short film Dir. Alexandra Schepisi
2013	Quiz	Hairdresser	Short film Dir. Alistair Reid
2015	Downriver	Rita	Dir. Grant Scicluna
2017	Boy Saviour	Mother	Short film Dir. Arthur Angel
2018	The Story	The Woman	Short film Dir. Steven J. Tandy
2022	Slant	Kaye Kopoulos	Dir. James Vinson

=== Television ===
Year	Title	Role	Notes
1994	A Country Practice	Aleki Vlahos	TV series, 1 episode: "Love Potion Number Nine"
1995	Correlli	Kim	Miniseries, episode 7: "Wishin' and Hopin'"
1997–1998	Raw FM	Sarah Tomic	Series regular 13 episodes
1999–2000	Thunderstone	Jett	TV series, 25 episodes
2000	Something in the Air	Cheryl Stephanopoulas	TV series, 2 episodes
2001	The Secret Life of Us	Salea	TV series, season 1, 2 episodes
2002	MDA	Tina Morello	TV series, season 1, episode 6: "Damned If You Do/Damned If..."
2002	Marshall Law	The Woman	Miniseries, 1 episode
2003	Blue Heelers	Constable Paula Milburn	TV series, season 10, 2 episodes
2005	Scooter: Secret Agent	Constable Barnes	TV series, season 1, episode 9
2005	Last Man Standing	Margot	TV series, season 1, episode 13
2009	Dirt Game	Annie	Miniseries, 2 episodes
2010	Dead Gorgeous	Mrs Miller	TV series, 4 episodes
2011	Offspring	Jane	TV series, season 2, episode 11: "Complications"
2011	Rush	Anna Vargas	TV series, season 4, 8 episodes
2012	Tangle	Miss Papas	TV series, season 3, 5 episodes
2016–2018	Nowhere Boys	Anna	TV series, seasons 3–4, 5 episodes
2017	Utopia	Marissa	TV series, season 1, episode 8: "Independence Day"
2018	Back in Very Small Business	Olivia Micheledes	TV series, season 1, 8 episodes
2018	How to Stay Married	Eileen	TV series, season 1, episode 4
2018	The Housemate	Reinbough's mum	TV series, season 1, episode 4: Richmond's Next Top Housemate"
2020	AussieWood	Irena Wood	
2021	Fires	Collette	Miniseries, episode 5
2023–present	Bay of Fires	Kerry	TV series, seasons 1–2, 15 episodes
2024	The Twelve	Connie d'Angelo	TV series, season 2, 7 episodes

== Theatre ==
Year	Title	Role	Notes
2002	Bearhunt		Chunky Move Studios, Melbourne with The Hoist Theatre Group
2007	All The Way to the Top		Fairfax Studio, Melbourne with Pregnant Goldfish Productions for Short+Sweet
	Snoop (reading)	Kimbo	Melbourne Theatre Company

== Personal life ==
Mandalis is married to her Head On co-star, Damien Fotiou, with whom she has two sons. The couple run Melbourne drama school, Brave Studios and children's drama school Greentree Acting School in Mebourne's Footscray, a sister school to Brave Studios.

Mandalis credits the role of her background in her career: “being Greek is the reason my acting career is what it is today”, adding that her Greek Australian part in Only the Brave "launched" her acting career. Early in her career, however, she was not considered for non-Greek roles: “In the early 90’s being an actress of Greek heritage in Australia was both a blessing and, in a way, a curse,” And that “In the days before screen diversity was really embraced, I was viewed by many as only being Greek[…] If the surname didn’t end in ‘opoulos’ I would never be asked to audition.”
