= LGBTQ culture in Australia =

LGBTQ culture in Australia encompasses the various arts and entertainment events in the country that have a focus on sexual diversity or include LGBTQ people in them.

The city with the largest LGBTQ community in Australia is Sydney, New South Wales. According to a 2013 Pew Research survey, 79% of Australians are accepting of homosexuality, ranking the country as the fifth most tolerant. Sydney is renowned for its LGBTQ rights activism and the annual Gay and Lesbian Pride festival, making it one of the most LGBTQ-friendly cities both in Australia and globally.

== Cinema ==
=== Films ===
The 1998 film Head On, directed by Ana Kokkinos and starring Alex Dimitriades and Paul Capsis, is the film adaptation of the novel Loaded.

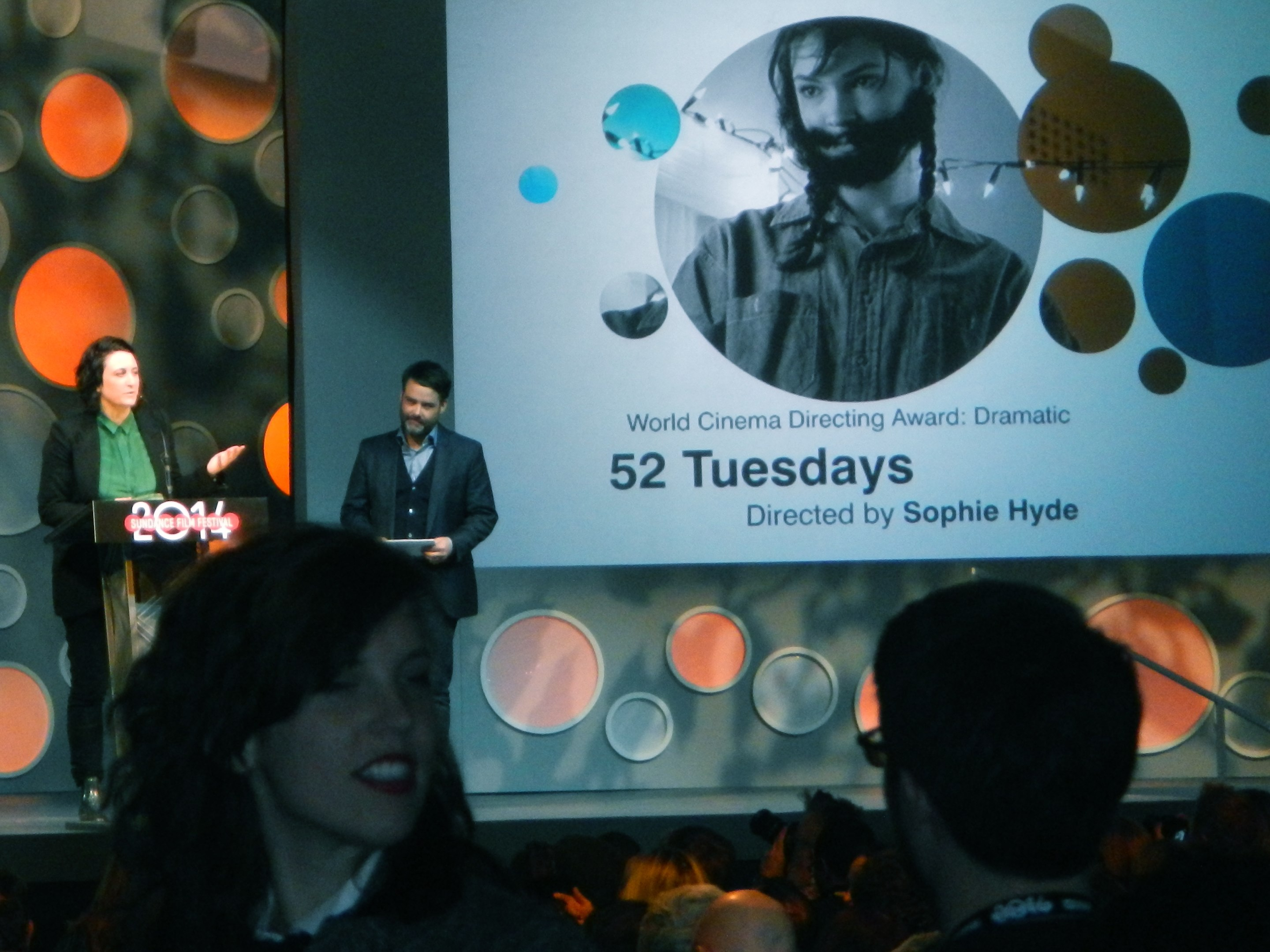
Sophie Hyde during the 52 Tuesdays screening at the Sundance Film Festival.

52 Tuesdays is a 2013 drama and personal growth film directed by Sophie Hyde. The film focuses on a teenage girl dealing with the gender transition of one of her parents. It was screened at the 2014 Sundance Film Festival, where it was nominated for the Grand Jury Prize, and won the Best Director Award. Over the next year, it received numerous awards and critical acclaim worldwide.

=== Events ===
The Mardi Gras Film Festival is an Australian LGBTQ film festival held annually in Sydney, New South Wales, as part of Sydney's Mardi Gras celebrations for gays and lesbians. It is organised by Queer Screen Limited, a non-profit organisation, and is one of the largest queer film platforms in the world.

== Sports ==
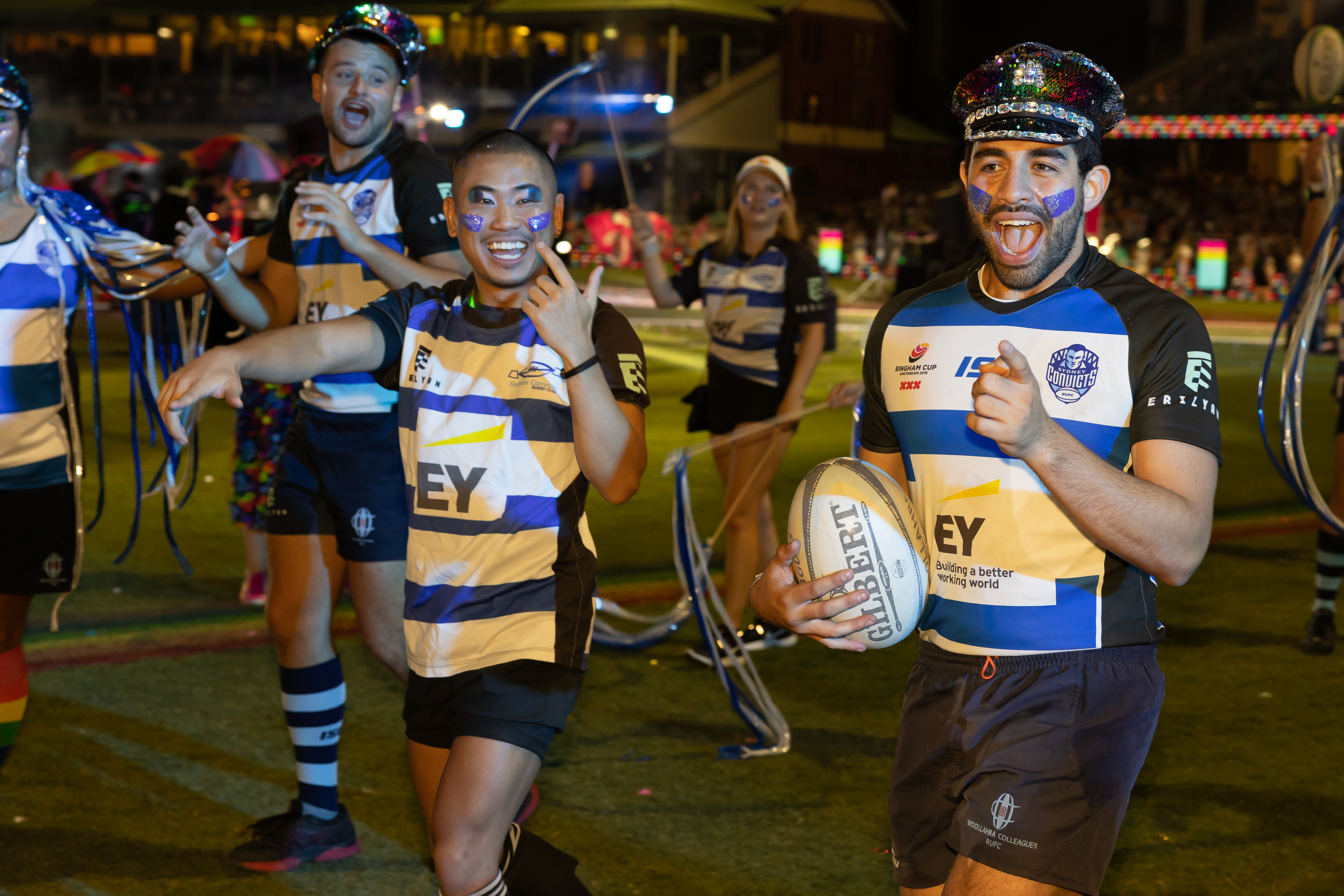
Players of the Sydney Convicts at the 2021 Sydney Gay and Lesbian Mardi Gras.

In 1982, the first LGBTQ football team, known as the 'Adelaide Armpits', started its first season in the city of Adelaide. This team continued to compete in various events in South Australia for a period of 30 years.

The Sydney Convicts are the first gay and inclusive club in Rugby Australia. Founded in 2004, they compete in the Sydney Suburban Rugby Union (Subbies) championship under the umbrella of Woollahra Colleagues RFC, and are members of the NSW Rugby Union. They are also dedicated to promoting the fight against homophobia in sports and have been involved in a number of initiatives to bring about change. Together with their partners and sponsors, they have worked to increase awareness and conversation around the issue. Following the 2014 Bingham Cup in Sydney, they launched an inclusion and anti-homophobia framework specifically designed for sports in Australia. They also led the international 'Out on The Fields' survey, which investigated homophobia in sport, the first study of its kind globally.

In Victoria, Melbourne Rovers SC, founded in 2008, is an LGBTQIA+ inclusive community football club competing in Football Victoria's metropolitan leagues. The club was featured in Museums Victoria's Home is Football exhibition documenting the role of football in Australian migrant and LGBTQ communities.

Days ahead of the 2022 World Cup in Qatar, Australia's national team, the Socceroos, released a video calling for human rights reforms and the decriminalisation of LGBTQ relationships in the host country, highlighting concerns about the treatment of migrant workers and advocating for the freedom to love without restriction. This statement coincided with the anniversary of player Josh Cavallo's public announcement of his sexual orientation a year earlier.

== Literature ==
In 1990, Morris Gleitzman's award-winning novel and stage adaptation Two Weeks with the Queen was published, proving controversial and groundbreaking in its coverage of homosexuality and HIV/AIDS.

In 1995, Christos Tsiolkas' novel Loaded was published. The work has subsequently been adapted into film and theatre, including into the 1998 film Head On.

In 2015, youth literature in Australia underwent a shift in addressing LGBT issues. There was a growing recognition of the importance of broadly representing diversity in young people's lives. During this period, novels such as Becoming Kirrali Lewis, Cloudwish, The Flywheel and The Foretelling of Georgie Spider were published, that explored a range of experiences by both Australian and American authors. These stories dealt with issues such as sexual identity, race, disability and mental health.

Butch is Not a Dirty Word is a biannual Australian magazine, the only magazine in the world dedicated specifically to butch lesbians and their supporters.

== Leisure and entertainment ==
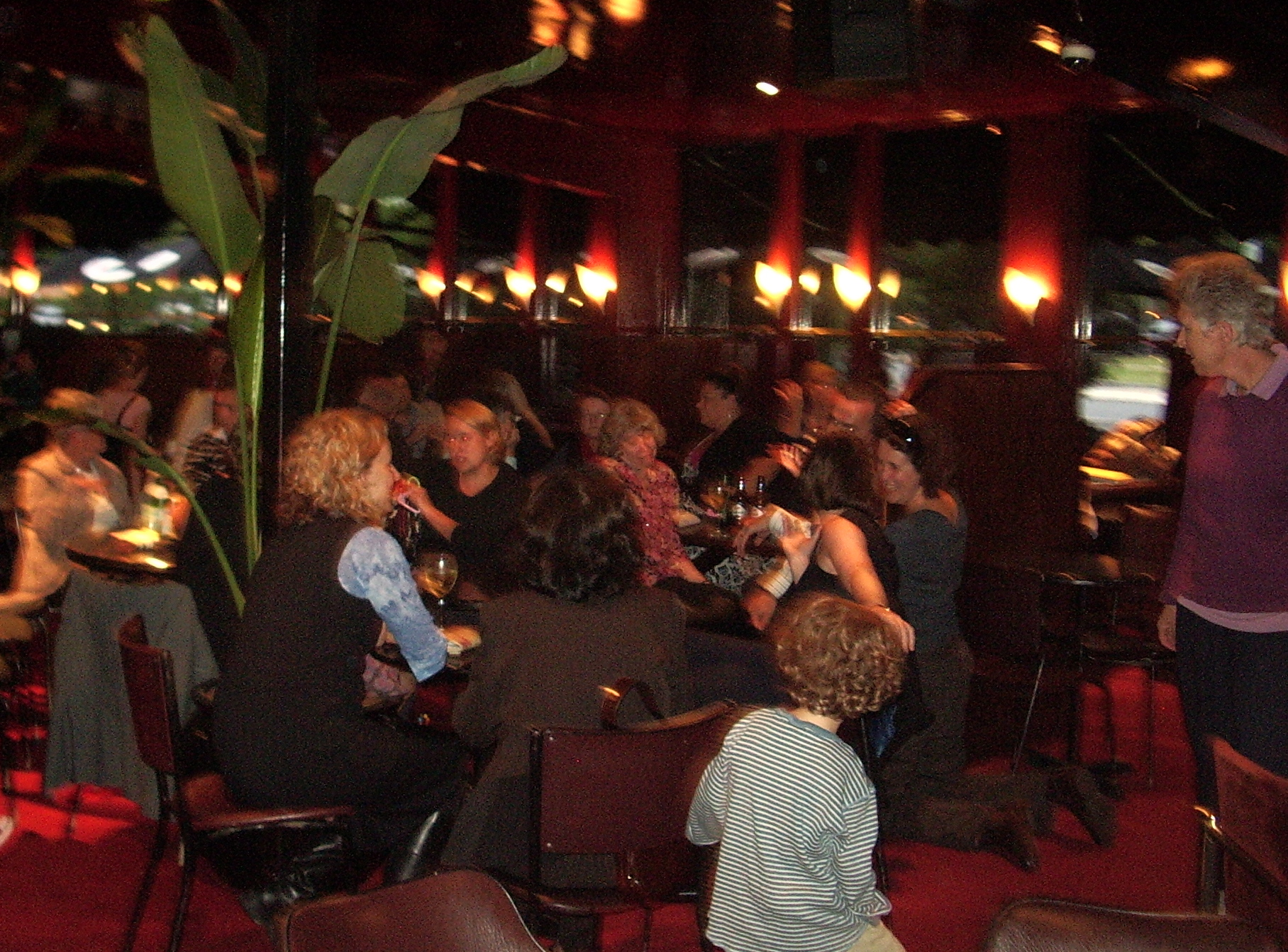
Group of women at Tilley's in 2010.

Tilley's Devine Café Gallery, also called Tilley's, is a well-known café in the Canberra suburb of Lyneham, Australia. It was named after Matilda "Tilly" Devine, an English-born Australian gangster and madam from Sydney. When the café first opened in 1984, it was intended to be a women-only venue, and men could only enter if accompanied by women. It was especially popular with lesbian women, and quickly became an icon of Canberra's LGBT scene.

== Television ==
=== 1970's ===
While homosexuality was illegal, Australian television shows involving main characters with gay storylines led the ratings. These shows include Prisoner, The Box, which featured the first bisexual kiss in television history, and Number 96, which featured a gay character, a transgender character and a gay kiss for the first time in television history.

Drag was mainstream in Australia earlier than in other parts of the world, with Sydney entertainer Carlotta playing a transgender character in Number 96.

=== 1980's and 1990's ===
In the documentary Outrageous: The Queer History of Australian TV, former Australian High Court Justice Michael Kirby says that the 1970s series Number 96 helped to soften some of the hysteria surrounding the AIDS crisis in the decades that followed by "showing that LGBTQ+ people were just like everyone else". However, as the AIDS epidemic spread and due to the reluctance of some Australian television executives, gay characters disappeared from television series in the country.

== Theatre ==
Loaded, the play based on the novel by Christos Tsiolkas, who personally, in collaboration with playwright Dan Giovannoni, was responsible for adapting it, opened in 2023. Directed by Stephen Nicolazzo and starring Danny Ball, the play has been praised for its emotional impact and its ability to address deep issues with gravity and vulnerability.

== Drag ==
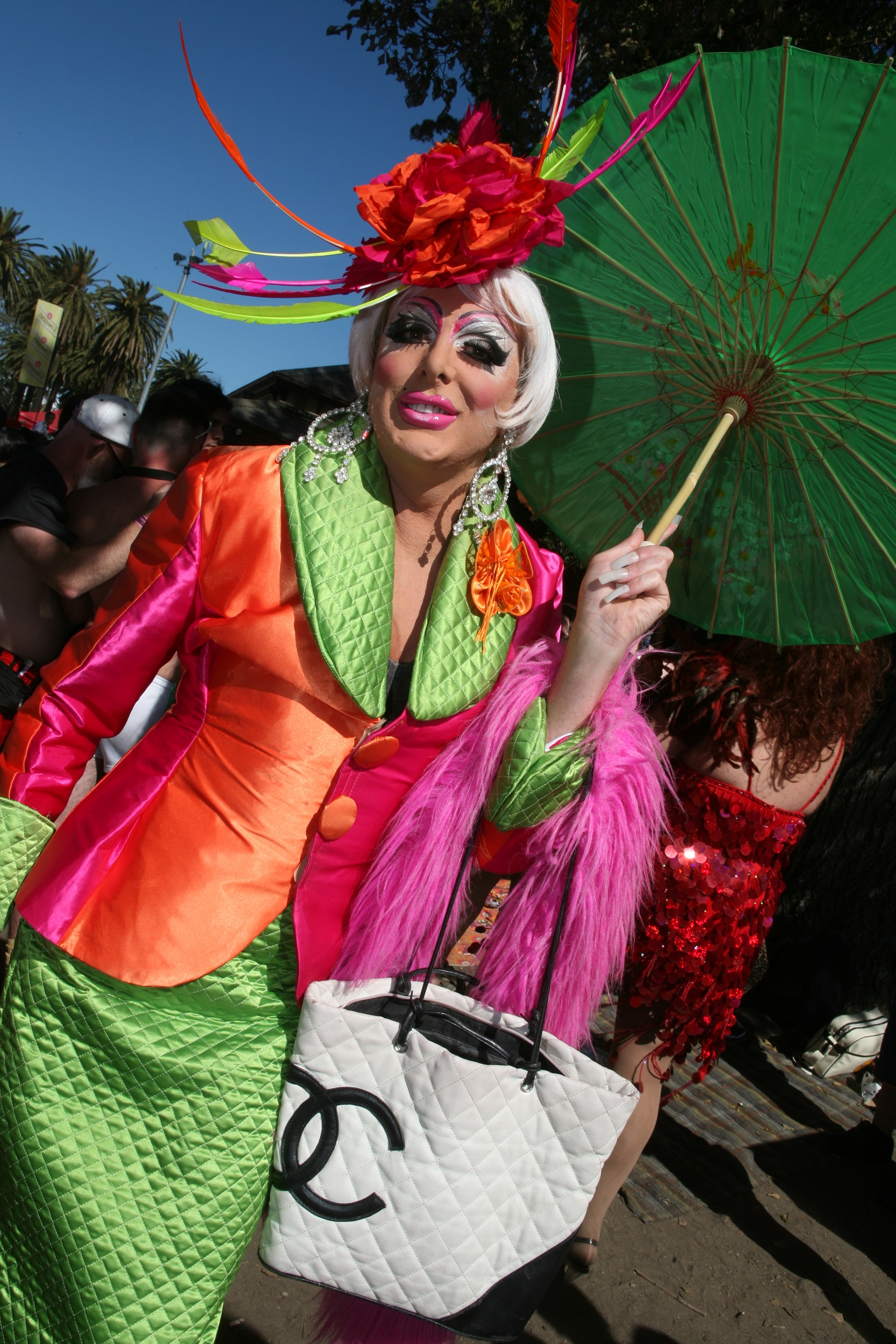
Drag queen in a LGBT festival LGBT in Melbourne in 2010.

The Miss Gay and Miss Trans Australia International is an annual event held in Melbourne that promotes LGBTQ diversity. It is Australia's largest drag and trans beauty pageant. Winners participate in community and charity engagements, parade at prominent gay festivals and join the Australia Day parade to celebrate gender inclusion. The pageant takes place in February, providing opportunities to participate in subsequent events.

== Festivities ==
- Midsumma Festival, an annual festival in Melbourne since 1988, is organised by Midsumma, Australia's leading queer arts and culture organisation. The festival includes a wide variety of queer events celebrating LGBTQ culture, featuring local, national and international artists. The festival programme encompasses art forms such as visual arts, live music, theatre, film, parties, sports and more. Midsumma has become an important platform to give visibility to diverse queer communities and provide a safe and inclusive space. The organisation also engages with First Nations communities, culturally diverse audiences and artists, younger and older generations, people with disabilities, transgender and gender diverse communities, and diverse families. In addition, Midsumma provides support and development opportunities to emerging artists and culture makers through programmes such as Midsumma Futures and Midsumma Pathways.
- Mr Gay Pride Australia is Australia's largest male pageant, organised by the country's gay community. Its aim is to find a man who represents and supports the values and struggle for equality of the LGBTQ community. Unlike other beauty pageants, physical appearance is not assessed at any stage and is not a requirement for participation. The aim is to prepare leaders and spokespersons for the LGBTQ community, who are able to speak in public and show community engagement and leadership. Participants submit entries via social media and eight finalists are selected for testing and stage performances at the event. The winner will represent Australia at the Mr World competition each year.

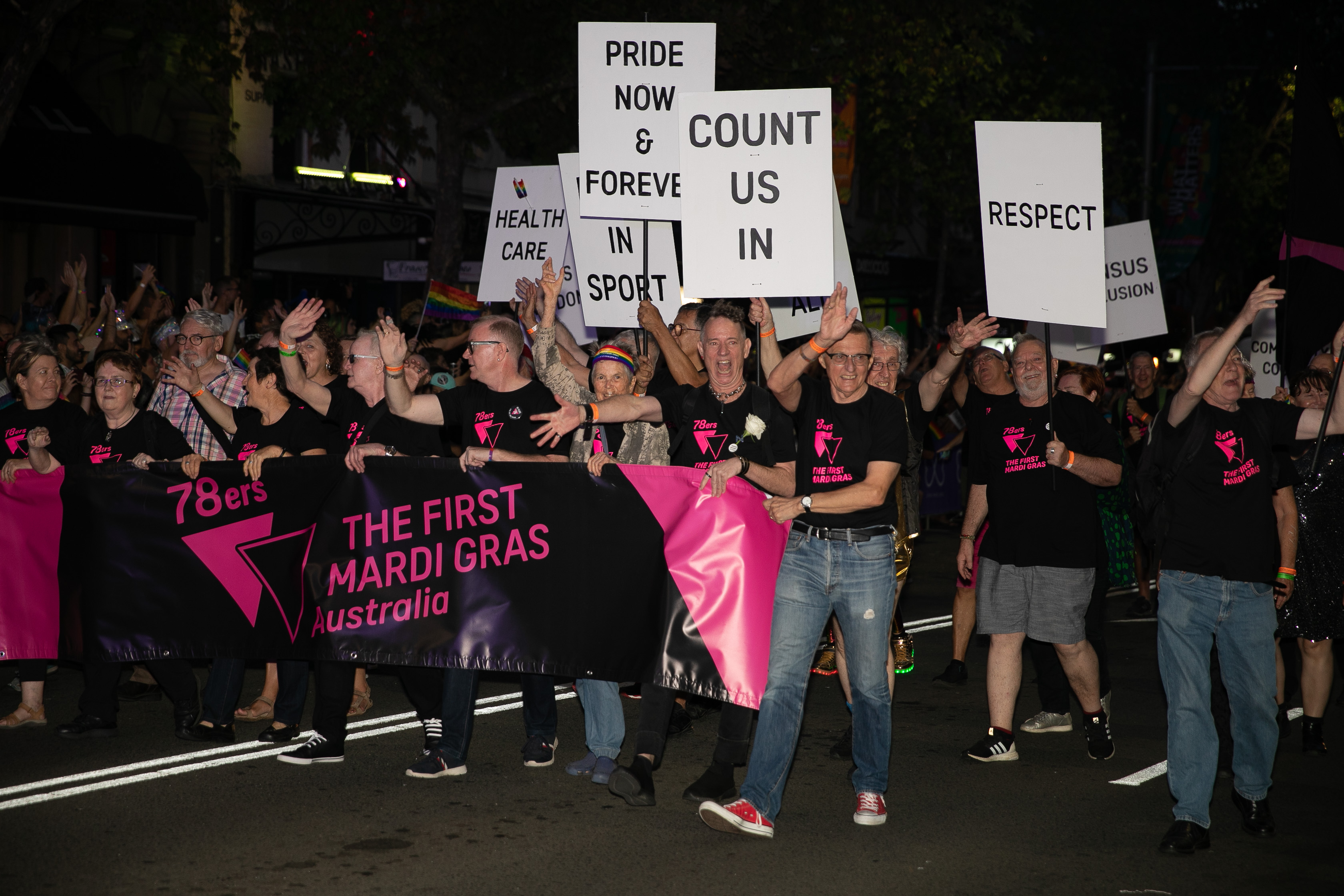
Attendees of the 2020 Mardi Gras during its pride parade.

- Sydney Mardi Gras is one of the largest gay festivals in the world, held in Sydney annually. It started as a small march in 1978 to support the LGBTQ community and has grown into a larger street party and a platform to fight for gay rights. It attracts over 250,000 people from all over the world and features a highlight parade followed by numerous parties. As well as being a celebration, the festival seeks to promote the fight for LGBTQ rights in Australia.
- Gay Pride in Australia is a state-wide movement promoted by the LGBT+ community. This not-for-profit organisation seeks to promote integration and support for all members of the LGBT+ community in Australia. Each state has its own agenda of events, such as the Pride Queer Film Festival, Sunshine Coast Pride, Brisbane Pride Festival, Life Outback is Never a Drag, Canberra's Very Own Pride Festival, Pride March Adelaide, Pride Western Australia, Pride de Tas and the Freedom To Be Me Newcastle. These festivals take place throughout the year, but the most prominent take place between February and March.
- Fresh Out Fair Day is an annual celebration showcasing LGBTQ pride and diversity in Canberra's Glebe Park.
- SpringOUT Festival is a queer cultural festival in Canberra. Starting in 1999, it is a celebration of the LGBTQIA+ community in the city. With only two volunteers at the beginning, it has grown to include a pride march and various activities. The festival recognises and honours First Peoples, as well as gender and sexuality diverse activists who have fought for the rights and freedoms of the community.
- WorldPride 2023 was held in Sydney. It was estimated to be attended by around 50,000 people.

== See also ==
- LGBTQ literature in Australia
