= Damien Fotiou =

Australian actor

- Education: VCA (1994); Adelaide University
- Occupation: Actor
- Known for: Thunderstone (1999); Kick (2007); Neighbours (2015–2017); La Brea (2021–2024)
- Spouse: Elena Mandalis
- Children: 2

Damien Fotiou (Greek: Δαμιανός Φωτίου, romanized: Damianós Fotíou) is an Australian television and film actor of Greek descent.

== Early life ==
Fotiou began his acting career at the age of 9, in a stage production of Oliver at the Adelaide Festival Theatre. As a young adult, he studied acting at Victorian College of the Arts, graduating in 1994. He also holds a Bachelor of Arts from Adelaide University.

== Career ==
Fotiou began his acting career in 1998 with a guest role in the series Good Guys, Bad Guys. He also had an early role in Ana Kokkinos’ 1998 film Head On, alongside Alex Dimitriades, playing a second generation Greek Australian.

In 1999, he took on the regular role of identical twins Sundance and Sutch in 38 episodes of science fiction series Thunderstone. He appeared in Hollywood adventure comedy film Kangaroo Jack in 2003. He was then a regular in the series Kick in 2007, playing the role of Nico Angelidis.

In late 2014, Fotiou joined the cast of long-running soap opera Neighbours, in the ten-week role of Dr Nick Petrides, brother of Terese Willis (Rebekah Elmaloglou), who falsely told Paul Robinson (Stefan Dennis) that he had leukaemia. He first appeared on screen in 2015 and made his last appearance in 2017. In 2021, he had a recurring role in American science fiction drama series La Brea as Judah.

Fotiou has made numerous guest appearances in Australian television series including Halifax f.p. and Good Guys, Bad Guys, Stingers, Blue Heelers, The Secret Life of Us, Underbelly and Rush. Later appearances have included Tomorrow When the War Began, Wentworth, Fires and Bay of Fires.

His other film credits include romantic comedy/drama Beware of Greeks Bearing Guns (2000) and arthouse thriller The Book of Revelation (2006).

Fotiou has also worked in radio on ABC Radio National and is a voice over artist.

== Filmography ==
Film
Year	Title	Role	Notes
1998	Head On	Joe	Feature film
2000	Fovou tous Ellines aka Beware of Greeks Bearing Guns	Jim	Feature film
2003	Kangaroo Jack	Baby J	Feature film
2005	The Extra	2nd AD	Feature film
2006	The Book of Revelation	Shopkeeper	Feature film
2013	Quiz	Cerebrum	Short film
Television
Year	Title	Role	Notes
1998	Good Guys, Bad Guys	Johnny Lubich	1 episode
1999	Halifax f.p.	Michael Slevic	1 episode
1999	Thunderstone	Sundance / Sutch	Recurring role
2002	The Secret Life of Us	Gerard	1 episode
2003	The Saddle Club	Antoine	1 episode
2002–2004	Blue Heelers	Vinnie Morelli	3 episodes
2002–2004	Stingers	Aggi Carrazza / Dominic Dominelli	2 episodes
2005	Scooter: Secret Agent	Harrison	1 episode
2007	Kick	Nico Angelidis	Recurring role
2008	Underbelly	Bill 'Bubba' Kaldas	Season 1, recurring role
2010	Rush	Zonneveldt	2 episodes
2015, 2017	Neighbours	Nick Petrides	Recurring role
2021	Wentworth	Detective Puzo	1 episode
2021	Fires	Macca	1 episode
2022	More Than This	Daniel	2 episodes
2021–2024	La Brea	Judah	Recurring role
2025	Bay of Fires	Domas	2 episodes (2.1, 2.7)
2026	Ground Up	George	2 episodes (1.1, 1.4)
Stage
Year	Title	Role	Notes
1984	Oliver!	Workhouse Boys / Fagin's Gang	Adelaide Festival Centre with Southbrook Group & Cameron Mackintosh
	The Arabian Nights	Prince Kamar	VCA, Melbourne
	The Man of Mode	Mr Dorimant	VCA, Melbourne
	The Love of the Nightingale	Chorus/Soldier	VCA, Melbourne
	Too Young for Ghosts	Oliver Bourke/Murphy	VCA, Melbourne
	Tales from the Vienna Woods	The Captain	VCA, Melbourne

== Personal life ==
Fotiou is married to his Head On co-star, Elena Mandalis, with whom he has two sons. The couple run Melbourne drama school, Brave Studios and children's drama school Greentree Acting School in Mebourne's Footscray, a sister school to Brave Studios.
