= 1998 Australian Film Institute Awards =

Australian film and television award ceremony

40th Australian Film Institute Awards
- Date: 7 November 1998
- Site: Sydney Convention and Exhibition Centre

Highlights
- Best Film: The Interview
- Most awards: Film: Oscar and Lucinda (5); TV: Wildside (5)
- Most nominations: Film: The Boys (13); TV: Wildside (6)

Television coverage
- Network: SBS

The 40th Australian Film Institute Awards (generally known as the AFI Awards) were held on 7 November 1998 at the Sydney Convention and Exhibition Centre. Presented by the Australian Film Institute (AFI), the awards celebrated the best in Australian feature film, documentary, short film and television productions of 1998. The Boys received the most nominations in the feature film category with thirteen, while Wildside received six nominations in the television category.

== Winners and nominees ==
Winners are listed first and highlighted in boldface.

=== Feature film ===
| Best Film | Best Achievement in Direction |
|---|---|
| **The Interview — Bill Hughes**; Head On — Jane Scott; Radiance — Ned Lander, Andrew Myer; The Boys — Robert Connolly, John Maynard | **Rowan Woods — The Boys**; Ana Kokkinos — Head On; Rachel Perkins — Radiance; Craig Monahan — The Interview |
| Best Performance by an Actor in a Leading Role | Best Performance by an Actress in a Leading Role |
| **Hugo Weaving – The Interview**; Alex Dimitriades – Head On; David Wenham – The Boys; Ray Barrett – In the Winter Dark | **Deborah Mailman – Radiance**; Rachel Griffiths – Amy; Cate Blanchett – Oscar and Lucinda; Lynette Curran – The Boys |
| Best Performance by an Actor in a Supporting Role | Best Performance by an Actress in a Supporting Role |
| **John Polson – The Boys**; Geoffrey Rush – A Little Bit of Soul; Paul Capsis – Head On; Anthony Hayes – The Boys | **Toni Collette – The Boys**; Rena Owen – Dance Me to My Song; Miranda Otto – In the Winter Dark; Angela Punch-McGregor – Terra Nova |
| Best Original Screenplay | Best Screenplay Adapted from Another Source |
| **Craig Monahan, Gordon Davie – The Interview**; David Parker – Amy; Heather Rose, Frederick Stahl, Rolf de Heer – Dance Me to My Song; Deborah Cox – Dead Letter Office | **Stephen Sewell – The Boys**; Andrew Bovell, Ana Kokkinos, Mira Robertson – Head On; Laura Jones – Oscar and Lucinda; Louis Nowra – Radiance |
| Best Achievement in Cinematography | Best Achievement in Editing |
| **Geoffrey Simpson – Oscar and Lucinda**; Martin McGrath – In the Winter Dark; Tristan Milani – The Boys; Simon Duggan – The Interview | **Jill Bilcock – Head On**; James Bradley – Radiance; Nick Meyers – The Boys; Suresh Ayyar – The Interview |
| Best Achievement in Sound | Best Original Music Score |
| **Andrew Plain, Ben Osmo, Gethin Creagh – Oscar and Lucinda**; Lloyd Carrick, Roger Savage, Craig Carter, Livia Ruzic – Head On; Sam Petty, Peter Grace, Phil Judd – The Boys; Peter Palankay, Stephen Witherow, John Wilkinson, Peter Smith – The Interview | **Thomas Newman – Oscar and Lucinda**; Ollie Olsen – Head On; The Necks – The Boys; David Hirschfelder – The Interview |
| Best Achievement in Production Design | Best Achievement in Costume Design |
| **Luciana Arrighi – Oscar and Lucinda**; Chris Kennedy – Dead Letter Office; Sarah Stollman – Radiance; Richard Bell – The Interview | **Janet Patterson – Oscar and Lucinda**; Anna Borghesi – Head On; Annie Marshall – The Boys; Aphrodite Kondos – The Sound of One Hand Clapping |

=== Non-feature film ===
| Best Documentary | Best Direction in a Documentary |
|---|---|
| **The Dragons of Galapagos – David Parer, Elizabeth Parer-Cook**; Mohamed Ali's Happy Day Feast – Catherine Dyson; Paying For The Piper – Ed Punchard; Urban Clan – Aanya Whitehead, Paul Humfress | **David Goldie – The Big House**; Christopher Tuckfield – A Breath; John Hughes – After Mabo; Peter Butt – The Liners – Episode 3, "The Great Dual" |
| Best Short Fiction Film | Best Short Animation |
| **Two/Out – Kriv Stenders**; Delia – Priscilla Cameron; My Bed Your Bed – Erica Glynn; Tears – Ivan Sen | **Vengeance – Wendy Chandler**; Harry The Human Fly – Darryl Aylward; Has Beans – Andrew Tamandl; Seabound – Donna Kendrigan |
| Best Screenplay in a Short Film | Best Achievement in Cinematography in a Non-Feature Film |
| **Evan Clarry – Mate**; Phillip Crawford – Denial; Danielle MacLean – My Colour Your Kind; Peter Rasmussen – Picture Woman | **David Parer – The Dragons of Galapagos**; Daniel Featherstone – Great Falls; Ray Argall – The Bridge; Philip Bull – The Rough Shed |
| Best Achievement in Editing in a Non-Feature Film | Best Achievement in Sound in a Non-Feature Film |
| **Cath Chase – Box**; Phillip Crawford – Denial; Lawrie Silvestrin – Paying for The Piper; Peter Butt – The Liners – Episode 3, "The Great Dual" | **Michael Gissing – Urban Clan**; Paul Finlay, Peter Walker, Dale Cornelius – Mama Tina; Sebastian Craig, Nick Meyers, Sion Tammes – Remote; David White, Liam Egan – Three Chords and A Wardrobe |

=== Television ===
| Best Episode in a Television Drama Series | Best Television Mini-Series or Telefeature |
|---|---|
| **Wildside – Series 1, Episode 17 (ABC) – Steve Knapman**; Blue Heelers – Series 4, Episode 37, "Collateral Damage" (Seven Network) – Riccardo Pellizzeri; Good Guys, Bad Guys – Series 2, Episode 7, "Dog People" (Nine Network) – Roger Le Mesurier, Roger Simpson, John Wild; SeaChange – Series 1, Episode 7, "Stormy Weather" (ABC) – Sally Ayre-Smith | **Wildside (ABC) – Steve Knapman**; Halifax f.p. – "Afraid of The Dark" (Nine Network) – Roger Le Mesurier, Roger Simpson, Terry Jennings; Never Tell Me Never (Network Ten) – David Elfick, Anne Bruning; The Violent Earth (Nine Network) – Jock Blair, David Rouse, Bruce Gordon |
| Best Episode in a Television Drama Series (Long) | Best Children's Television Drama |
| **Home and Away – Episode 2413 (Seven Network) – Russell Webb**; All Saints – Series 1, Episode 20, "Revelations" (Seven Network) – Jo Porter; All Saints – Series 1, Episode 6, "Give And Take" (Seven Network) – Jo Porter; Home and Away – Episode 2197 (Seven Network) – Russell Webb | **Blabbermouth & Stickybeak (ABC) – Ann Darrouzet**; Mirror, Mirror II – Episode 20, "Shipwreck" (Nine Network) – Andrew Blaxland, Dave Gibson; Ocean Girl – Series 4, Episode 2, "The Mysterious Pyramid" (ABC) – Jonathan M. Shiff; Ocean Girl – Series 4, Episode 3, "The Transport" (ABC) – Jonathan M. Shiff |
| Best Performance by an Actor in a Leading Role in a Television Drama | Best Performance by an Actress in a Leading Role in a Television Drama |
| **Stephen Dillane – Kings in Grass Castles (Seven Network)**; Shane Connor – Halifax f.p. – "Afraid Of The Dark" (Nine Network); David Wenham – SeaChange – Series 1, Episode 9, "Balls and Friggin' Good Luck" (ABC); Tony Martin – Wildside (ABC) | **Rachael Blake – Wildside – Series 1, Episode 20 (ABC)**; Rebecca Gibney – Halifax f.p. – Series 3, "Afraid of The Dark" (Nine Network); Claudia Karvan – Never Tell Me Never (Network Ten); Sophie Heathcote – Raw FM – Episode 8, "Raw 'n Sore" (ABC) |
| Best Achievement in Direction in a Television Drama | Best Screenplay in a Television Drama |
| **Peter Andrikidis – Wildside – Series 1, Episode 17 (ABC)**; Julian Kemp – Blabbermouth & Stickybeak (ABC); Steve Jodrell – Halifax f.p. – Series 3, "Afraid of The Dark" (Nine Network); Michael Offer – The Violent Earth (Nine Network) | **Tim Pye – Wildside – Series 1, Episode 17 (ABC)**; Roger Simpson – Halifax f.p. – Series 3, "Afraid of The Dark" (Nine Network); Deborah Cox – SeaChange – Series 1, Episode 7, "Stormy Weather" (ABC); Peter Gawler, Tony Ayres – The Violent Earth (Nine Network) |

=== Additional awards ===
| Raymond Longford Award | Byron Kennedy Award |
|---|---|
| **Charles 'Bud' Tingwell** | **Arthur Cambridge**; **Alison Barrett** |
| Young Actors' Award | Best Foreign Film |
| **Paul Pantano – Water Rats – Series 3, Episode 16: "Romeo Is Bleeding" (Nine Network)** | **LA Confidential – Arnon Milchan, Curtis Hanson, Michael Nathanson**; Kundun – Barbara De Fina; The Full Monty – Uberto Pasolini; The Ice Storm – Ted Hope, James Schamus, Ang Lee |
Open Craft Award
**John Hughes, Uri Mizrahi (for visual design) – After Mabo**; Erika Addis, Rosemary Hesp, Tim Richter (for visual design) – Relative Strangers; Maya Stange (for performance) – The Bridge; Tony Ryan (for performance) – Two/Out
