= Mira Robertson =

Australian writer

Mira Robertson is an Australian writer and script editor.

== Career ==
Robertson co-wrote the short film Only the Brave with Ana Kokkinos. She then co-wrote Head On, a feature film adaptation of the 1995 novel Loaded by Christos Tsiolkas, with Ana Kokkinos and Andrew Bovell. Robertson's first novel, The Unexpected Education of Emily Dean, was published in 2018. The plot was partly inspired by Robertson's experience growing up on a farm and her mother's stories. Her second novel, Grace and Marigold, was published in 2024.

== Personal life ==
Robertson lives in Melbourne, Australia. She is in a long-term relationship with filmmaker and frequent creative partner, Ana Kokkinos.

== Filmography ==
=== Television ===
Year	Title	Notes
2019	The Hunting	Mini-series, script editor
2021	The Unusual Suspects	Mini-series, script executive

=== Film ===
Year	Title	Notes
1994	Only the Brave	Short film, co-written with Ana Kokkinos
1998	Head On	Co-written with Ana Kokkinos and Andrew Bovell
2006	The Book of Revelation	Script editor
2008	Whatever Happened to Brenda Hean?	Documentary, co-written with Scott Millwood
2010	The Room at the Top of the Stairs	Short film, script editor
2013	Galore	Script editor

== Books ==
- The Unexpected Education of Emily Dean (Black Inc, 2018)
- Grace and Marigold (Spinifex Press, 2024)

== Awards and nominations ==
Year	Award	Category	Work	Result	Notes	Ref.
1994	Australian Film Institute Awards	Best Screenplay in a Short Film	Only the Brave	Won	with Ana Kokkinos	
1998	AWGIE Awards	Feature Film - Adaptation	Head on	Won	with Andrew Bovell and Ana Kokkinos	
1998	Australian Film Institute Awards	Orlando Trilogy Award for Best Adapted Screenplay	Head on	Nominated	with Andrew Bovell and Ana Kokkinos	
1998	Film Critics' Circle of Australia Awards	Best Adapted Screenplay	Head on	Nominated	with Andrew Bovell and Ana Kokkinos	
