= Only the Brave (1994 film) =

Australian film by Ana Kokkinos

- Directed by: Ana Kokkinos
- Written by: Ana Kokkinos; Mira Robertson
- Produced by: Fiona Eagger; Rina Reiss; Chris Warner
- Starring: Elena Mandalis; Dora Kaskanis
- Cinematography: Jaems Grant
- Edited by: Mark Atkin
- Music by: Philip Brophy
- Release date: 1994
- Running time: 59 mins
- Country: Australia
- Language: English
- Box office: A$75,921 (Australia)

Only the Brave is a 1994 Australian film directed by Ana Kokkinos. It focuses on two young Greek Australian friends, Alex (Elena Mandalis) and Vicki (Dora Kaskanis) in Melbourne’s Western suburbs. It received acclaim upon release, winning Best Film at the Melbourne International Film Festival and Best Short Film at the 1994 Australian Film Institute Awards.

Several of the actors (Mandalis, Kaskanis & Eugenia Fragos) were later cast in Greek Australian roles in Kokkinos' 1998 drama film, Head On.

== Synopsis ==
Two adolescent second generation Greek Australian friends, Alex and Vicki, live in Melbourne's Western suburbs. Vicki has a challenging home-life, she is sexually abused at home by her father and bored at school. Alex, meanwhile, misses her mother and is struggling with her sexuality as she becomes attracted to her teacher, Kate, and falls in love with Vicki. Amid these struggles, the girls hang out, commit arson and find solace in spending time together.

== Cast ==
- Elena Mandalis as Alex
- Dora Kaskanis as Vicki
- Maude Davey as Kate
- Helen Athanasiadis as Maria
- George Harlem as Mr. Stefanou, Vicki's father
- Eugenia Fragos as Mrs. Stefanou, Vicki's mother
- Peta Brady as Tammy
- Nico Lathouris as Laslo
- John Brumpton as Paul
- Tina Zerella as Sylvie
- Bobby Bright as Rog
- Mary Sitarenos as Athena

== Release ==
The film received premieres and screenings at many film festivals around the world, including: Sundance Film Festival, 1994 Toronto International Film Festival, 51st Venice International Film Festival, Chicago International Film Festival, London Film Festival, Vancouver International Film Festival, Cork Film Festival, Thessaloniki International Film Festival, Antipodean Film Festival, Frameline Film Festival and the Seattle International Film Festival. It was also showcased in Strictly Oz: A History of Australian Film, a feature exhibit at the Museum of Modern Art in Manhattan.

In Australia, the film premiered at the Melbourne International Film Festival.

== Reception ==
The film received acclaim, with film critic Emanuel Levy writing in Variety: "A harrowing, ultra-realistic coming-of-age portrait of a group of tough teenage girls, “Only the Brave” is a new Australian film of astonishing, raw power." Levy continued to praise the "sharply observant script" and how it has "the novelty of portraying alienation and rites of passage among girls whose ethnic minority (Australians of Greek descent) accentuates their marginal positions and feelings." Levy also praised Kokkinos' direction: "in congruence with her brilliantly naturalistic direction, Kokkinos imbues the picture with alert intelligence and depth, successfully resisting the more clinical strategy of American movies of the week."

Australia's National Film and Sound Archive curator and film critic, Paul Byrnes writing: "it was clear evidence that a major new voice (Kokkinos) had arrived in Australian film... the film showed that Kokkinos had an uncompromising ambition to tell powerful and personal stories."

It also went on to win several awards:

- Best Short Film - 1994 Australian Film Institute Awards
- Audience Award - Sundance Film Festival
- Best Feature Film - Frameline Film Festival
- Best Film - Melbourne International Film Festival

== See also ==
- Only the Brave (disambiguation)
