= None but the Brave (disambiguation) =

None but the Brave is a 1965 Japanese-American film by Frank Sinatra.

None but the Brave may also refer to:

- None but the Brave (1928 film), a 1928 silent film
- None but the Brave (1960 film), a 1960 Western film
- None But the Brave (play), a 1925 farcical melodramatic play
- None but the Brave (cocktail)

== See also ==
- Only the Brave (disambiguation)
