= Fires (TV series) =

Australian television series

- Promotional poster
- Genre: Anthology; Drama
- Created by: Belinda Chayko; Tony Ayres
- Based on: Black Summer bushfires
- Written by: Belinda Chayko; Jacquelin Perske; Mirrah Foulkes; Steven McGregor; Anya Beyersdorf
- Directed by: Michael Rymer; Ana Kokkinos; Kim Mordaunt
- Starring: Eliza Scanlen; Hunter Page-Lochard; Sam Worthington; Richard Roxburgh; Sullivan Stapleton; Miranda Otto; Noni Hazlehurst; Anna Torv; Mark Leonard Winter; Kate Box
- Country of origin: Australia
- Original language: English
- No. of seasons: 1
- No. of episodes: 6

Production
- Executive producers: Tony Ayres; Liz Watts; Andrea Denholm; Belinda Chayko
- Producer: Elisa Argenzio
- Camera setup: Multi-camera
- Production companies: Tony Ayres Productions; NBCUniversal International Studios; Matchbox Pictures

Original release
- Network: ABC Television
- Release: September 26 – October 31, 2021

Fires is a six-part Australian television drama series on ABC TV which first screened on 26 September 2021, set against the background of the 2019–20 Australian bushfire season.

== Synopsis ==
Fires is an anthology series about the megafires which devastated Australia in 2019 and 2020, and captured the world's attention.

== Cast ==
- Eliza Scanlen as Tash
- Hunter Page-Lochard as Mott
- Sam Worthington as Glen Findlay
- Richard Roxburgh as Duncan Simpson
- Sullivan Stapleton as Doug
- Noni Hazlehurst as Caris Mazzeo
- Miranda Otto as Kath Simpson
- Anna Torv as Lally Robinson
- Kate Box as Ruth
- Helana Sawires as Nawra
- William Pollock
- Daniel Henshall as Kip
- Sally McKenzie as Dell
- Mark Leonard Winter as Joel Welch
- Charlotte Best as Mish
- Helen Thomson as Yvonne Webber
- Steve Bastoni as Vince Rocca
- Elena Mandalis as Collette
- Shareena Clanton as Aunt Rose
- Damien Fotiou as Macca
- Russell Dykstra as David Jasic
- Bernard Curry as Nick the Journo
- Tony Briggs as IC Greg Hoy
- Ian Bliss as Gary Saunders
- Tony Rickards as Rollo
- Luke Ford as Panicked man on phone (voice)

== Production ==
The series was commissioned by the ABC Television network in August 2020.

== Episodes ==
No.	Title	Directed by	Written by	Original release date	Australian viewers
1	"Episode 1"	Michael Rymer	Belinda Chayko	26 September 2021	354,000
Queensland, September 2019: Lightning strikes and starts what is to become a long, hot and treacherous summer for young volunteer firefighters Tash and Mott. New starter Mott makes several mistakes at his first fire, damaging the hose and burning his hand. But when the truck is damaged at the second fire and the flames too fierce to allow rescue, it is his calm presence that enables the more experienced Tash to remember her training so they may endure a "burn over" and walk away once the fire has passed.
2	"Episode 2"	Ana Kokkinos	Jacquelin Perske	3 October 2021	295,000
Queensland, November 2019: Dairy farmers Kath and Duncan return to their farm to find their milking shed the only structure still standing; their house and a significant portion of their stock victims of the fire. They struggle to maintain their routine while awkwardly staying with their son's fiance Brooke, as they wait for Lachie to return. But after the roads open and Lachie doesn't arrive, Duncan finds his burnt out car on the fire road. Tempers flare when Kath tries to blame Brooke for making him risk the unsafe roads, while Brooke incites community sentiment against the 14 year old son of a neighbour when she and Kath discover him smoking. In the end, the revelation that Brooke is pregnant quells the immediate anger and gives everyone some hope for the future.
3	"Episode 3"	Kim Mordaunt	Mirrah Foulkes	10 October 2021	318,000
New South Wales, December 2019: Tash and Mott join the local fire-fighting effort in a small beachside community as locals and tourists alike have to make the difficult decision of whether to stay or flee. Joel, a recovering addict who works at a caravan park, befriends young Roi and his parents, Saikat and Bec, when Roi gets lost in the park. When the park is evacuated, Joel's friend Marita leaves without him and steals his methadone. Joel is forced to ask Saikat and Bec for a lift to Canberra. Struggling with withdrawal, his desperation makes him convince the family to take a back road to avoid the closed highway. Despite poor visibility, a flat tyre, low fuel and fraying tempers, they eventually make it to Canberra. Meanwhile, Adrian agrees to drive his daughter to her mother's, leaving his partner Lally to finish the preparations to defend their home. But when road closures force him to stay away another night, Lally finds herself overwhelmed with no electricity, dwindling batteries and no reception. Just as she decides to leave, the "Watch and Act" alert changes to "Shelter in Place", trapping her. Though she survives the night and Adrian returns the next morning, she tells him she cannot stay to defend and begs him to leave with her. Adrian refuses to leave the house, and Lally leaves without him.
4	"Episode 4"	Kim Mordaunt	Steven McGregor & Belinda Chayko	17 October 2021	371,000
New South Wales, Christmas Eve 2019: Tash and Mott escort locals from a small rural community to the Bungan community hall for refuge from the fires. Among the refugees is Mish, a former Bungan resident who has moved to Sydney to pursue music. She clashes with her former classmates, Dean and Penny, and her former music teacher, Glen. Despite Glen's best efforts, the community hall is poorly prepared, with no electricity and little food, most of which is eaten by a rogue pet goat. After hearing how others have lost so much and the children worried that Santa won't find them, Mish and Glen decide to raid the nearby properties still standing for food, presents and a Christmas tree. The next morning, they are able to put together a makeshift Christmas for the refugees, with some mismatched presents going to the children and Glen dressing as Santa.
5	"Episode 5"	Ana Kokkinos	Anya Beyersdorf	24 October 2021	321,000
New South Wales, Late December 2019: Tash and Mott are on their last rotation before going home. Two fire fronts join up, creating a "megafire". The fire reaches Ruth and Nawra, defending their home and the wildlife they care for. Despite dispatcher Kip sending Tash and Mott to assist them, they are rerouted by his colleague Dell after reports of flames approaching a nursing home, which is later revealed as a false alarm. This causes frustration in the control centre as the dispatchers struggle to make the best decisions with their limited resources. Ruth and Nawra try to shelter in place but after the roof catches fire, they flee and barely make it out with their lives. They make it to Curran, where they find a few others sheltering in Rollo's stockfeed store. Rollo has a radio scanner, and they realise the QVFS truck was diverted from helping them. Tash and Mott refill at Curran, where they have an encounter with a furious Ruth. Tash and Mott head back to base to be relieved but a strong wind change drives the fire back towards Curran. Though they try to make it back to the town, the wind rolls the truck down an embankment and Tash is fatally injured. Though Kip tries to talk Mott through CPR, Tash succumbs to her injuries while the Curran refugees listen in on the scanner.
6	"Episode 6"	Michael Rymer	Belinda Chayko	31 October 2021	304,000
Victoria, New Years Eve 2019: A massive fire bears down on a seaside town, forcing residents and holiday-makers to evacuate to the beach. The smoke cloud covers the sun, turning the sky dark, then bright red. Adut is separated from her parents and encounters Doug on the beach, a man desperate to get back to his home to defend. After failing to find her parents, he allows her into his boat and they head up the river to his property. Despite his best efforts, he fails to save his home. Once the danger passes, Doug and Adut return to the beach, where Adut is reunited with her parents. Meanwhile, community radio host Caris has been on air for hours, relaying advice from the VFS. Jai and his cousin, the deaf Barney, arrive at the station to call Barney's mother. When the power goes out, Barney proves instrumental in helping get Caris back on air, while Jai is traumatised when a terrified man calls the station. They are unable to help before the fire apparently overtakes him. February, 2020: Fire season has given way to heavy rains and flooding. Doug is visited at his ruined property by Adut and her family with gifts to thank him for looking after her. Jai is still struggling with memories of the man who called the station, and Caris encourages him to talk to Barney and not deal with it alone. Kath and Duncan are shown still living with Brooke, the three of them on much better terms as they await the birth of Brooke's child. Joel has returned to work at the caravan park. Adrian lives at his house, having saved his home but lost Lally who has stayed in Sydney. Mish and Glen put on a bushfire relief concert at the community hall. Ruth and Nawra learn firefighting techniques from their neighbours, having patched their relationship troubles. Mott, along with Tash's family and the rest of the QVFS, plants a tree in Tash's memory.

== Release ==
The series aired on ABC TV from 26 September 2021.

It aired on the CTV Drama Channel in Canada, and RTÉ 2 in Ireland.

== Awards ==
- 11th AACTA Awards: Winner, AACTA Award for Best Telefeature or Mini Series
- 55th AWGIE Awards: Nominated, Best Screenplay, Television – Limited Series
- Logie Awards of 2022: Winner, Logie Award for Most Outstanding Miniseries or Telemovie
