= Blessed (2009 film) =

Australian film by Ana Kokkinos

- Theatrical film poster
- Directed by: Ana Kokkinos
- Written by: Andrew Bovell; Patricia Cornelius; Melissa Reeves; Christos Tsiolkas
- Based on: Who's Afraid of the Working Class? by Andrew Bovell; Patricia Cornelius; Melissa Reeves; Christos Tsiolkas; Irene Vela
- Produced by: Al Clark
- Starring: Miranda Otto; Frances O'Connor
- Cinematography: Geoff Burton
- Edited by: Jill Bilcock
- Music by: Cezary Skubiszewski
- Production companies: Blessed Film Productions; Film Victoria (funding); Head Gear Films; Screen Australia (funding); Wildheart Zizani
- Distributed by: Icon Film Distribution
- Release date: 10 September 2009
- Running time: 113 minutes
- Country: Australia
- Language: English
- Box office: A$457,898 (Australia)

Blessed is a 2009 Australian drama film directed by Ana Kokkinos and starring Miranda Otto and Frances O'Connor. It was released in Australia on 10 September 2009. It is a film adaptation of the play Who's Afraid of the Working Class? by Andrew Bovell, Patricia Cornelius, Melissa Reeves, Christos Tsiolkas and Irene Vela. The film was written by Bovell, Cornelius, Reeves and Tsiolkas. The film is 113 minutes in length and was filmed in Melbourne.

== Premise ==
The film is centered upon the interweaving lives and misadventures of six lost kids who wander the Melbourne streets at night while their mothers await their return home.

== Cast ==
- Frances O'Connor as Rhonda
- Miranda Otto as Bianca
- Deborra-Lee Furness as Tanya
- Victoria Haralabidou as Gina
- Monica Maughan as Laurel Parker
- Wayne Blair as James Parker
- William McInnes as Peter
- Tasma Walton as Gail
- Sophie Lowe as Katrina
- Anastasia Baboussouras as Trisha
- Harrison Gilbertson as Daniel
- Eamon Farren as Roo
- Eva Lazzaro as Stacey
- Reef Ireland as Orton
- Costas Kilias as Chris
- Ditch Davey as Nathan
- Brett Climo as Michael

== See also ==
- Cinema of Australia
