= Andrew Bovell =

Australian writer for theatre, film and television

- Born: 1962 (age 63–64); Kalgoorlie, Western Australia
- Occupation: Writer

Andrew Bovell (born 1962) is an Australian writer for theatre, film and television.

== Life ==
Bovell was born on 23 November 1962 in Kalgoorlie, Western Australia and completed his secondary school education in Perth. He graduated from the University of Western Australia with a BA and followed that with a Diploma in Dramatic Arts at the Victorian College of Arts, in Melbourne.

== Writing career ==
His AWGIE award-winning play, Speaking in Tongues, (1996) has been seen throughout Australia as well as in Europe and the US and Bovell adapted it for the screen as Lantana (2001). Both the play and screenplay have been published by Currency Press along with After Dinner (1988), Holy Day (2001), Scenes from a Separation (written with Hannie Rayson) (1995) and Who's Afraid of the Working Class? (1998), written with Patricia Cornelius, Melissa Reeves, Christos Tsiolkas and Irene Vela. Who's Afraid of the Working Class? was adapted to film as Blessed.

When the Rain Stops Falling (2008) won awards in the 2008 Victorian Premier's Literary Awards, the 2008 Queensland Premier's Literary Awards,, and the New South Wales Premier's Literary Awards.

In 2010, a production of When the Rain Stops Falling opened in New York. The New York Times reviewed the play describing it as "a fitfully moving but diagrammatic play about the long legacy of unnatural acts" and commenting that "the relationships eventually emerge with an emotional clarity that the play’s elliptical structure works against".

== Plays ==
- After Dinner
- Holy Day; winner of the 2002 Victorian Premier's Literary Award and AWGIE – Stage Award.
- Who's Afraid of the Working Class?; winner of the 1999 AWGIE Award – Best New Work & Best Stage Play, Victorian Green Room Award, and the Queensland Premier's Literary Award.
- Speaking in Tongues; first performed at the Griffin Theatre Company, Sydney and winner of the 1997 AWGIE – Stage Award.
- When the Rain Stops Falling; winner of the 2008 Queensland Premier's Literary Award and Victorian Premier's Literary Award, as well as the 2009 Victorian Green Room Award, AWGIE – Stage Award, and Sydney Theatre Award – Best New Australian Work.
- The Secret River, adapted for the stage from the novel The Secret River by Kate Grenville; the play was presented by the Sydney Theatre Company in January 2013.
- Things I Know To Be True
- Songs of First Desire

== Films ==
Bovell's film credits include Lantana (2001) and Blessed (2009) as mentioned above. Bovell also co-wrote the screenplay for Strictly Ballroom (1992) with Baz Luhrmann and Craig Pearce and Head On (1998) with Mira Robertson and Ana Kokkinos. His other film credits include Edge of Darkness (2010) starring Mel Gibson, The Book of Revelation (2006) and Iris (2016). He wrote the thriller film A Most Wanted Man, directed by Anton Corbijn, based on the novel A Most Wanted Man by John le Carré.

== Other activities ==
Bovell was on the jury for the Feature Fiction and Documentary awards at the 2020 Adelaide Film Festival.

== Recognition and awards ==
- 2014: David Williamson Prize, for The Secret River
