= Hugh Baldwin =

Australian actor

- Occupation: Actor
- Notable work: Heartbreak High

Hugh Baldwin is an Australian actor. For his performance in Heartbreak High he was nominated for the 1994 AFI Award for Best Lead Actor in a Television Drama.

Baldwin trained with NIDA, appearing in the 1992 graduating class production titled Images of Moliere. Later stage productions he featured in were Then the Mountain Comes (Australian Museum, 1994) and The Malevolence.

On TV Baldwin featured on Heartbreak High on Network Ten in 1994. He played a gay music teacher who in one episode is falsely accused of sexual abuse. For that episode he was nominated for an AFI Award for Best Lead Actor in a Television Drama. He later starred in Children's Hospital on the ABC.
