= 1994 Australian Film Institute Awards =

Australian film and TV awards ceremony

36th Australian Film Institute Awards
- Date: 4 November 1994

Highlights
- Best Film: Muriel's Wedding
- Most awards: Feature film: Muriel's Wedding, Bad Boy Bubby (4); Television: The Damnation of Harvey McHugh (4)

The 36th Australian Film Institute Awards (generally known as the AFI Awards) were held in 1994. Presented by the Australian Film Institute (AFI), the awards celebrated the best in Australian feature film, television, documentary and short film productions of the year.

== Feature film ==
Best Film	Best Direction
Muriel's Wedding – Lynda House, Jocelyn Moorhouse; Bad Boy Bubby – Rolf de Heer, Giorgio Draskovic, Domenico Procacci; The Adventures Of Priscilla, Queen Of The Desert – Al Clark, Michael Hamlyn, Rebel Penfold-Russell; The Sum of Us – Hal McElroy	Rolf de Heer – Bad Boy Bubby; Alkinos Tsilimidos – Everynight ... Everynight; P. J. Hogan – Muriel's Wedding; Stephan Elliott – The Adventures Of Priscilla, Queen Of The Desert
Best Actor in a Leading Role	Best Actress in a Leading Role
Nicholas Hope – Bad Boy Bubby; John Hargreaves – Country Life; Hugo Weaving – The Adventures of Priscilla, Queen of the Desert; Terence Stamp – The Adventures of Priscilla, Queen of the Desert	Toni Collette – Muriel's Wedding; Kerry Fox – Country Life; Tara Fitzgerald – Sirens; Victoria Longley – Talk
Best Actor in a Supporting Role	Best Actress in a Supporting Role
Max Cullen – Spider & Rose; Bill Hunter – Muriel's Wedding; John Polson – The Sum of Us; Kiet Lam – Traps	Rachel Griffiths – Muriel's Wedding; Jeanie Drynan – Muriel's Wedding; Deborah Kennedy – The Sum of Us; Jacqueline McKenzie – Traps
Best Original Screenplay	Best Adapted Screenplay
Rolf de Heer – Bad Boy Bubby; P. J. Hogan – Muriel's Wedding; Kym Goldsworthy – The Roly Poly Man; Stephan Elliott – The Adventures of Priscilla, Queen of the Desert	David Stevens – The Sum of Us; Michael Blakemore – Country Life; Ray Mooney, Alkinos Tsilimidos – Everynight ... Everynight; Robert Carter, Pauline Chan – Traps
Best Cinematography	Best Editing
Nino Gaetano Martinetti ACS – Exile; Ian Jones – Bad Boy Bubby; Stephen F. Windon ACS – Country Life; Brian J. Breheny – The Adventures of Priscilla, Queen of the Desert	Suresh Ayyar – Bad Boy Bubby; Bill Murphy – Body Melt; Jill Bilcock – Muriel's Wedding; Frans Vandenburg – The Sum of Us
Best Original Music Score	Best Sound
Douglas Stephen Rae – Traps; Paul Grabowsky – Exile; Rachel Portman – Sirens; Guy Gross – The Adventures of Priscilla, Queen of the Desert	David Lee, Glenn Newnham, Livia Ruzic, Roger Savage – Muriel's Wedding; Philip Brophy, Steve Burgess, Craig Carter, Gary Wilkins – Body Melt; Dean Humphries, David Lee, Susan Midgley – Sirens; John Dennison, John Patterson, Leo Sullivan, Tony Vaccher – The Sum of Us
Best Production Design	Best Costume Design
Owen Paterson – The Adventures of Priscilla, Queen of the Desert; Chris Kennedy – Gino; Paddy Reardon – Muriel's Wedding; Michael Philips – Traps	Lizzy Gardiner, Tim Chappel – The Adventures of Priscilla, Queen of the Desert; Anna Borghesi – Body Melt; Wendy Chuck – Country Life; Terry Ryan – Muriel's Wedding

== Additional awards ==
Best Foreign Film
Four Weddings and a Funeral – Duncan Kenworthy; Like Water For Chocolate – Alfonso Arau; Schindler's List – Steven Spielberg; In The Name Of The Father – Jim Sheridan
Raymond Longford Award	Byron Kennedy Award
Jack Thompson	John Hargreaves

== Television ==
Best Episode in a Television Drama Series	Best Mini-Series or Telefeature
Heartland - Episode 7 (ABC) – Bruce Best; The Damnation of Harvey McHugh - Episode 9, 'Hey, St Jude' (ABC) – Sue Masters; G.P., Series 6 - Episode 13, 'Double Bind' (ABC) – Peter Andrikidis; Police Rescue, Series 3 - Episode 12, 'Double Illusion' (ABC) – Sandra Levy, John Edwards	Under the Skin - Episode 5, 'The Long Ride' (SBS) – Franco di Chiera; The Battlers (Seven Network) – Gus Howard; The Seventh Floor (Network Ten) – John Sexton; Under the Skin - Episode 3, 'Grandma's Teeth' (SBS) – Franco di Chiera
Best Performance by an Actor in a Leading Role in a Television Drama	Best Performance by an Actress in a Leading Role in a Television Drama
Aaron Blabey – The Damnation of Harvey McHugh - Episode 1, 'Spay Misty For Me' (ABC); Peter Kowitz – G.P., Series 6 - Episode 8, 'Innocent Bystander' (ABC); Bradley Byquar – Heartland - Episode 4 (ABC); Hugh Baldwin – Heartbreak High - Episode 14 (Network Ten); Ernie Dingo – Heartland - Episode 7 (ABC)	Monica Maughan – The Damnation Of Harvey McHugh - Episode 3, 'My Brilliant Chorea' (ABC); Diana Lin – Under the Skin - Episode 5, 'The Long Ride' (SBS); Sigrid Thornton – G.P., Series 6 - Episode 13, 'Double Bind' (ABC); Jacqueline McKenzie – The Battlers (Seven Network)
Best Achievement in Direction in a Television Drama	Best Screenplay in a Television Drama
Julian Pringle – Heartland - Episode 7 (ABC); Belinda Chayko – Under the Skin - Episode 3, 'Grandma's Teeth' (SBS); Geoffrey Nottage – The Damnation of Harvey McHugh - Episode 9, 'Hey, St Jude' (ABC); Michael Carson – Police Rescue, Series 3 - Episode 12, 'The Last To Know' (ABC)	John Misto – The Damnation of Harvey McHugh - Episode 9, 'Hey, St Jude' (ABC); Tony Ayres – Under the Skin - Episode 5, 'The Long Ride' (SBS); Kristen Dunphy – G.P., Series 6 - Episode 13, 'Double Bind' (ABC); Susan Hore – Blue Heelers, Series 1 - Episode 27, 'Nowhere To Run' (Seven Network)
Best Children's Television Drama	Best Television Documentary
Sky Trackers - Episode 1, 'Skating The Dish' (Seven Network) – Patricia Edgar, Margot McDonald; Escape from Jupiter - Episode 6, 'Fitness Test' (ABC) – Terry Jennings; Escape From Jupiter - Episode 4, 'Decoy' (ABC) – Terry Jennings; Sky Trackers - Episode 17, 'Long Distance Call' (Seven Network) – Patricia Edgar, Margot McDonald	Help Me God – Jennifer Brockie (ABC); No Death In Brunswick – Andrew Wiseman, Jack White (SBS); Creative Spirits 2 - 'Lowering The Tone - 45 Years Of Robyn Archer' – Don Featherstone (ABC); Black Angels: A Widening Vision – Jon Davy Tristram, I. James Wilson (ABC)
Young Actors Award (television)
Zybch Trofimiuk – Sky Trackers (Seven Network)

== Non-feature film ==
Best Documentary	Best Short Fiction Film
50 Years Of Silence – James Bradley, Ned Lander, Carol Ruff (director); Eternity – Lawrence Johnston (director); The Last Magician – Tracey Holloway, Liz Thompson (director); Watch The Watch – Malcolm McDonald (director)	Only The Brave – Ana Kokkinos (director); Frailejon – Joshua Yeldham (director); Rosie's Secret – Lisa Matthews (director); Simple – Polly Seddon (director)
Best Short Animation Film	Best Screenplay in a Short Film
Gorgeous – Kaz Cooke (director); Muttaburrasaurus – Grahame Binding, Norman Yeend (director); The Junky's Christmas – Nick Donkin (director); Total Recession – Durand Greig (director)	Only The Brave – Ana Kokkinos, Mira Robertson; Frailejon – Joshua Yeldham; Simple – Polly Seddon; The Silk – Alison Lyssa
Best Achievement in Cinematography in a Non-Feature Film	Best Achievement in Editing in a Non-Feature Film
Dion Beebe – Eternity; Susan Thwaites – Concrete Flesh; Tristan Milani – El Angelito (The Little Angel); Kriv Stenders – Motherland	Suresh Ayyar – Watch The Watch; Nick Meyers – Simple; Joel Pront – The Junky's Christmas; Stewart Young – The Last Magician
Best Achievement in Sound in a Non-Feature Film	Open Craft Award
Greg Fitzgerald, Peter Johnson, Andrew Lancaster – Universal Appliance Company; Bronwyn Murphy, Ronnie Reinhard, Peter Walker – Aeroplane Dance; Steve Best, Ian Sherry, Peter Sullivan – The Last Magician; Craig Carter, James Currie, Gretchen Thornburn – The Sewing Room; Michael Gissing, Peter Miller, Leo Sullivan – Watch The Watch	Elena Mandalis (for performance) – Only The Brave; Joshua Yeldham (for innovation in form) – Frailejon; Rey Carlson, Anna Grieve, James Manche (for art direction) – Pram Factory; Tracey Holloway, Liz Thompson (for direction) – The Last Magician

== See also ==
- List of Australian films of 1993
- List of Australian films of 1994
