= Head On (1998 film) =

Australian film by Ana Kokkinos

- Theatrical release poster
- Directed by: Ana Kokkinos
- Screenplay by: Andrew Bovell; Ana Kokkinos; Mira Robertson
- Based on: Loaded by Christos Tsiolkas
- Produced by: Jane Scott
- Starring: Alex Dimitriades; Paul Capsis; Julian Garner; Tony Nikolakopoulos; Elena Mandalis; Eugenia Fragos; Damien Fotiou; Andrea Mandalis; Dora Kaskanis; María Mercedes; Alex Papps; Vassili Zappa
- Edited by: Jill Bilcock
- Distributed by: Strand Releasing; Umbrella Entertainment
- Release date: 13 August 1998 (Australia)
- Running time: 104 minutes
- Country: Australia
- Languages: English, Greek

Head On is a 1998 Australian LGBT-related romantic drama film directed by Ana Kokkinos, who wrote the screenplay with Andrew Bovell and Mira Robertson. The film is based on the 1995 novel Loaded by Christos Tsiolkas. The film stars Alex Dimitriades, Paul Capsis, Elena Mandalis and Damien Fotiou. The film tells the story of Ari (Dimitriades), a dissolute 19-year-old second generation Greek-Australian in Melbourne. Ari is caught between his conservative Greek background and modern Australia, amid his homosexual desire.

The film premiered in May 1998 at the Cannes Film Festival, three months ahead of its Australian premiere.

The film gained notoriety upon its release for its sexual explicitness, including a graphic masturbation scene performed by Dimitriades and numerous sex scenes. The film was a commercial success in Australia and received generally positive reviews from critics, with reviewers praising its stark realism, the lead performance by Dimitriades and the uncompromising subject matter. It received nine nominations at the 1998 Australian Film Institute Awards and won 29 awards and accolades in Australia and overseas.

Australia's National Film and Sound Archive curator recognises it as a pioneering project in Australian filmmaking: "In terms of iconoclast daring, Head On has no equal in Australian cinema." Continuing that it concludes with the "most beautiful and enigmatic endings of any Australian film." It was Australia's first example of New queer cinema and is regarded as a "landmark piece of Australian queer cinema".

== Plot ==
We meet Ari, a dissolute 19-year-old second generation Greek Australian living with his working class parents and sister in Melbourne. He is unemployed and has an increasingly volatile relationship with his Marxist father Dimitri (Nikolakopoulos), who lectures him on responsibility. His mother, Sophia (Fragos), has a tender relationship with her son, but is worried about him. Unbeknownst to his parents, he engages in illicit drugs and casual sex with men. His sister, Alex (A. Mandalis), also hides her relationship with a Lebanese Australian from her parents.

Ari's friends are all second generation Greek Australians too. He is disappointed in his best friend Joe (Fotiou) for following convention rather than his heart by marrying Dina (Kaskanis). His other friend Johnny (Capsis) defies convention and is an extroverted cross-dresser, adopting the persona of Toula. He also connects easily with Joe's sister, Betty (E. Mandalis), as she too, engages in risky behaviours and rails against her Greek background.

After staying at his brother, Peter's (Papps) student house, Ari senses romantic chemistry with Peter's Anglo housemate, Sean (Garner). At Joe's house, his mother, Tasia (Mercedes) speaks to Ari in private about what she saw in his tea leaves. She saw Sean and tells him: “Find a girl, get married, and then it doesn’t matter what you do.” Ari and Dina take drugs together and he has partial sex with Betty.

Ari then goes to meet Sean at a club. Johnny, dressed in drag, convinces Ari to continue on to another club. Sean agrees to catch up with them later in the night. However, Ari and Johnny's taxi is stopped by the police. Both are humiliated, stripped and beaten at the police station. Johnny is savagely beaten by a Greek Australian cop that takes out his anger on him. Once released, Ari is not badly hurt, and goes to meet Sean at a club. They have sex at Sean's flat but Ari starts a fight, with Sean fighting back and kicking him out of the bedroom. In the early morning light, Ari at Melbourne's docks, dancing, Greek-style, reflecting on his meaningless life.

== Cast ==
- Alex Dimitriades as Ari, a nineteen-year old from a working class Greek background. He is increasingly at odds with his parents and the conservative nature of his community. He engages in drugs and casual sex with men.
- Paul Capsis as Johnny/Toula, Ari's cross-dressing, transgender friend. His mother has died and he faces constant battles with his conservative Greek father.
- Elena Mandalis as Betty, sister of Ari's best friend, Joe. She, like Ari, also rails against her conservative Greek background and engages in drugs. She has partial sex with Ari.
- Damien Fotiou as Joe, Ari's best friend. He is tired of Ari's excessive lifestyle. He is engaged to Dina as it makes the community and their families happy. They are rewarded with a deposit to buy a home together.
- Eugenia Fragos as Sophia, Ari's long-suffering mother. She worries about her son's well-being and protects him from her husband's rage.
- Julian Garner as Sean, the Anglo love interest of Ari. He is a university student that lives in a student house share with Ari's brother. He has an idealistic and liberal worldview that reflects his privilege.
- Tony Nikolakopoulos as Dimitri, Ari's father. He is constantly at odds with Ari and wants him to find a job. He argues with his wife, blaming her for the way Ari is living his life.
- María Mercedes as Tasia, Joe's mother. She reads Ari's tea leaves and sees Sean. She advises him: “Find a girl, get married, and then it doesn’t matter what you do.”
- Alex Papps as Peter, Ari's older brother. He is a university student living with his girlfriend and Sean in a student house share.
- Dora Kaskanis as Dina, Joe's fiancée. She is often at odds with Ari as he can see that her relationship with Joe is one of convention rather than love.
- Vassili Zappa as Vassili, Johnny/Toula's conservative Greek father, he rejects his son's cross-dressing and is ashamed. He constantly berates his child.
- Andrea Mandalis as Alex, Ari's younger sister. She conceals much of her partying from her parents, as well as her relationship with her Lebanese Australian boyfriend, Charlie.
- Katerina Kotsonis as Ariadne, Sean's university friend and an intellectual, also from a Greek background. She challenges Ari's world view.
- Neil Pigot as Senior Constable, an Anglo cop that is involved in the "bashing" of Ari and Johnny/Toula at the police station
- Fonda Goniadis as Cop, a cop of Greek descent that takes out his frustrations on Johnny/Toula in a particularly vicious beating at the police station.
- Costas Kilias as Taxi driver, a Turkish man he drives and converses with Ari and Johnny/Toula and they share humour about poor Greek Turkish relations. They take drugs together in the taxi and are stopped by the cops.
- Wasim Sabra as Charlie, the Lebanese Australian boyfriend of Alex

== Production ==
=== Casting ===
Several Greek Australian actors from Kokkinos' previous film, Only the Brave appear in this film. Elena Mandalis and Dora Kaskanis, protagonists of the previous film, again took on Greek Australian roles as Betty and Dina. Eugenia Fragos was also cast as the mother of Ari (Dimitriades). She had previously played Mrs Stefanou, mother of Vicki (Kaskanis) in Only the Brave. Elena Mandalis (Betty) and Andrea Mandalis (Alex) are real-life sisters.

=== Changes from the novel ===
The "bashing" scene at the police station, where Ari and Toula are assaulted by cops, was written for the film and does not come from the novel. Such incidents were not uncommon at the time in Australia. Kokkinos hired a cop for the rehearsals period and asked if the scene was overblown, he responded “No. Quite the contrary.”

== Release ==
The film premiered in May 1998 at the Cannes Film Festival, three months ahead of its Australian premiere at the Melbourne International Film Festival.

It also received premieres and screenings at film festivals around the world, including: 1998 Cannes Film Festival, Jerusalem Film Festival, Frameline Film Festival, Seattle International Film Festival, New Zealand Film Festival, Edinburgh International Film Festival and Gothenburg Film Festival, among others.

It returned to the Melbourne International Film Festival for a special screening at the 2022 festival.

It also had theatrical distribution in fifteen countries outside Australia, and secured a limited theatrical release in the United States.

== Reception ==
=== Box Office ===
It was a commercial success in Australia, as the third highest-grossing Australian film in 1998.

=== Critical response ===
On Rotten Tomatoes, the film has an approval rating of 58% based on reviews from 24 critics. Film critics Margaret Pomeranz and David Stratton both gave the film 4.5 out of 5 stars on SBS. Stratton also published a review inVariety praising Dimitriades for his "fine, brave work", adding "Onscreen in virtually every scene, the young thesp utterly convinces as a reckless, hedonistic seeker of instant gratification."

The film critic, Paul Byrnes wrote about the film's importance for the National Film and Sound Archive: "In terms of iconoclastic daring, Head On has no equal in Australian cinema...Head On is not just about the state of denial within the Greek community in Melbourne. It’s a bomb aimed at the placid and polite styles of Australian film." Byrnes concluded "It is more like a Scorsese film, a descent into a form of hell, in which the main character must battle his demons or die. The extraordinary finale, in which Ari dances on the docks where so many migrant families arrived on Australian soil, coupled with a narration that remains defiant and unapologetic, is one of the most beautiful and enigmatic endings of any Australian film."

Head On divided the Greek community in Australia, Kokkinos said in an interview with the Los Angeles Times. Kokkinos said "what it did is that it opened up a dialogue between younger Greeks and their parents. What the film has done is that it has broken down barriers."

The film received a retrospective review in The Guardian in 2014: "Head On is social realism crossed with a nightmare; kitchen sink drama that enters the realm of the senses...But viewed as a slow-burning portrait of an extended nightmare – of a coming of age gone brutally wrong – the film is painfully brilliant."

=== Accolades ===
1998 Australian Film Institute Awards

- Best Editing - Jill Bilcock (won)

And 8 nominations:

- Best Film
- Best Direction - Ana Kokkinos
- Best Actor - Alex Dimitriades
- Best Adapted Screenplay - Andrew Bovell, Ana Kokkinos and Mira Robertson
- Best Supporting Actor - Paul Capsis
- Best Costume Design - Anna Borghesi (nominated)
- Best Original Score - Ollie Olsen
- Best Sound - Lloyd Carrick, Roger Savage, Craig Carter, Livia Ruzic

L.A. Outfest

- Grand Jury Award: Outstanding Foreign Narrative Feature (Ana Kokkinos, won)

San Francisco International Lesbian & Gay Film Festival

- Best First Feature (Ana Kokkinos, won)

== Soundtrack ==
The soundtrack includes mostly Australian, British and Greek musical artists and composers: Death in Vegas, Lunatic Calm, Way Out West, The Saints, Underground Lovers, Dannii Minogue, Isaac Hayes, Silverchair, Primal Scream, The Visitors, Hot Chocolate, The Habibis, and Manos Loïzos.
