= Bay of Fires (TV series) =

- Genre: Drama; comedy
- Created by: Andrew Knight; Marta Dusseldorp; Max Dann
- Directed by: Natalie Bailey; Wayne Blair
- Starring: Marta Dusseldorp; Toby Leonard Moore; Ava Caryofyllis; Imi Mbedla; Nicholas Bell; Pamela Rabe; Alex Dimitriades; Tony Barry; Kerry Fox; Matt Nable; Rachel House
- Country of origin: Australia
- Original language: English
- No. of seasons: 2
- No. of episodes: 16

Production
- Executive producers: Greg Sitch; Andrew Knight; Brett Popplewell; Sally Riley; Alex Baldwin; Louise Smith
- Producers: Marta Dusseldorp; Yvonne Collins
- Cinematography: Martin McGrath
- Editors: Stephen Evans; Mark Atkin
- Running time: 55 min.
- Production companies: Archipelago; Fremantle

Original release
- Network: ABC
- Release: 16 July 2023 – present

Bay of Fires is an Australian television crime drama and dark comedy series, which screened on ABC Television from 16 July 2023. The series was co-created by Andrew Knight, Marta Dusseldorp, and Max Dann. Filming began in June 2022, with Natalie Bailey and Wayne Blair each directing four episodes. Locations used include the west Tasmanian towns of Queenstown, Strahan, and Zeehan. Dusseldorp also co-produced with Yvonne Collins. The series title references the actual Bay of Fires on Tasmania's east coast.

Dusseldorp stars as the main protagonist Stella, who is placed in witness protection in the fictitious Mystery Bay (set inland from west coast's Strahan). Most local residents are suspicious, devious, and criminally inclined. Stella tries to protect her children, Iris (Ava Caryofyllis) and Otis (Imi Mbedla), while adjusting to the family's new circumstances. Other main characters are local handyman Jeremiah (Toby Leonard Moore), federal agent Airini (Rachel House), criminal matriarch Frankie (Kerry Fox) and patriarchal cult leader Thaddeus (Matt Nable). Veteran Australian actor Tony Barry's last role was as Jeremiah's father, Joseph. Barry died in December 2022 after his scenes had been filmed but before editing started.

On 8 February 2024, the show was officially renewed for a second season, with Alex Dimitriades joining the cast as Anika's husband, Allessandro. The second season began airing on 15 June 2025.

== Synopsis ==
Financial brokerage firm ProsperAus' CEO Anika is attacked by assassins both in a supermarket and at home. They were hired by her de facto partner, Johann. ASIO agent Airini gives Anika a new identity as Stella. Airini asks Stella to provide details of Johann's illegal dealings. Together with her children, Otis and Iris, Stella is relocated to Mystery Bay, Tasmania. Upon arrival at the isolated and unwelcoming town Stella finds most residents are suspicious, devious, criminally inclined and in witness protection. Her new home and the town's services are woefully inadequate causing hardships for the family.

Stella begins a hesitant friendship with Jeremiah while encountering other locals. Frankie is a criminal matriarch overseeing numerous illegal activities including drug dealing and murder. Thaddeus, a self-styled patriarchal prophet, has tight control of his adherents. Meanwhile, visiting public servant Robin investigates payees but is obfuscated by locals and kidnapped. Frankie believes Robin and Stella are working together. Stella accidentally kills Robin. Jeremiah helps Stella dispose of Robin's corpse. Otis sells marijuana at school and develops a crush for Elysha. Stella destroys Jeremiah's marijuana crop. Stella is put on mock trial. While Frankie wants her killed, Stella convinces townsfolk she can make them money. Otis joins Elysha in Thaddeus' sect. Stella and Jeremiah sabotage Frankie's drug drop. Frankie becomes furious and threatens locals. Stella liberates Otis and Elysha. Johann and his henchmen arrive in Mystery Bay looking for Annika. Annika organises townsfolk to hijack ProsperAus' money laundering.

== Cast and characters ==
Credits:

- Marta Dusseldorp as Stella Heikkinen (née Anika Van Cleef): Mother of Iris and Otis (adoptee). ProsperAus CEO, targeted by assassins, relocated to Mystery Bay.
  - Molly Perkins as Young Stella (Anika): shops in department store without her parents.
- Toby Leonard Moore as Jeremiah Gurvan: tow-truck driver, handyman, farmer. Joseph's son, Jodie's love interest.
- Ava Caryofyllis as Iris Heikkinen: Stella's daughter, Otis's younger sister. Effervescent, imaginative and naive.
- Imi Mbedla as Otis Heikkinen: Stella's adopted son, Iris's older brother. Dour, cynical and intelligent. Elysha's love interest.
- Nicholas Bell as Graham Gordon Ellery: long-term hotel resident, blind. Formerly supervised witness relocations.
- Pamela Rabe as Magda (a.k.a. Madeleine Kokoris): (Note: Name listed by Robin as receiving government payments. Robin asks character what they know about named person.) Heather's partner, astute observer. Former Australian spy in East Berlin and Moscow.
  - Masha Basman as Young Magda: poisons Russian General.
- Alex Dimitriades as Allessandro (S2): Anika's husband and father of Iris and Otis (adoptee)
- Tony Barry as Joseph Gurvan: Jeremiah's father, widower, former farmer. Indebted to bank, previously owned Stella's house.
- Kerry Fox as Frankie McLeish (a.k.a. Vicky Stiles): criminal matriarch; pretends to be foster mother for her gang members. Thaddeus and Arthur's sister.
  - Grace Lydon as Young Frankie (Vicky): plays with brothers.
- Matt Nable as Thaddeus (a.k.a. Jonathan Stiles): religious cult leader, operates fresh food stall, gun runner. Frankie and Arthur's older brother.
  - Riley Baldwin as Young Thaddeus (Johnno): plays with siblings.
- Emily Taheny as Jodie: publican, postmistress, Jeremiah's love interest.
- Roz Hammond as Heather: Magda's partner and offsider.
- Rachel House as Airini/"Irene": ASIO assistant director. Investigates ProsperAus's criminal activity, relocates Stella to Mystery Bay. Stakes out Johann and his henchmen.
  - Lulu Quirk as Young Airini: minutes secretary for Vance.
- Robert Rabiah as Reg Brown: runs Thai restaurant. Works for Frankie.
- Bob Franklin as Connor (a.k.a. Ryan Raymond Greene): faux mechanic, clay bird shooter, hunts extraterrestrials.
- Oscar Redding as Arthur (a.k.a. Edward Stiles): Thaddeus and Frankie's brother, works for Frankie. Mentally and physically affected by long-term drug abuse.
  - Lachie Tyrrell as Young Arthur (Eddie): plays with siblings.
- Ilai Swindells as Sammi: IT/CCTV expert, initially works for Bong and Frankie.
- Nikolai Nikolaeff as Johann Mueller (a.k.a. Jakob Yanontov or Joseff Kuznetsov): ProsperAus senior employee, Anika's lover, hires assassins to kill her.
- Paul Roukchan as Ruslan: Johann's Chechen assassin-henchman, Yakov's associate.
- Vanya Essin as Yakov: Johann's Chechen assassin-henchman, Ruslan's associate.
- Ben Knight as Tarquin (a.k.a. Benjamin "Ben" Rooney): former bikie, second-hand shop attendant, works for Frankie.
- Kim Ko as Bong Cha (a.k.a. Mai Fong): motel operator, hides stolen goods, runs town's spy network.
- André de Vanny as Jason: inept local policeman, ignores Frankie's illegal activities. Father of Brony's baby.
- Stephen Curry as Francis Pike: former concreter, faux real estate agent, killed for selling Gurvan property to Stella.
- Yael Stone as Robin Ricketts: Department of Finance public servant, sent to Mystery Bay to investigate recipients of millions in payments.
- Emily Milledge as Brony: Tina's daughter, lives with Frankie, looks after baby. Friendly with Jason.
- Mitchem Everett as Jack: Frankie's son, henchman.
- John Stanton as Douglas: Recently retired ProsperAus CEO, Anika's father.
- Elena Mandalis (Elle Mandalis) as Kerry: works for Reg.
- Peter Sammak as Drago: works for Frankie.
- Rhys Muldoon as Vance Horsley: Attorney-General's deputy secretary, set up Mystery Bay's witness relocation programme in 1983.
- Anthony Sharpe as Manfred: erratic school bus driver. Formerly drove Bolivian trucks.
- Scott Wells as Charlie: Post Office worker. Becomes friends with Jack.
- Sandy Gore as George: judge consulted by Airini.
- Brigid Zengeni as Bethel: works for Thaddeus.
- Ben Winspear as Rowan Furness: Department of Finance public servant, Robin's boss. Dispatches Robin to Mystery Bay. Note: Winspear is Dusseldorp's spouse.
- Jalen Sutcliffe as Stretch: Frankie's henchman.
- Mackenzie Grant as Elysha: Thaddeus's adherent, kept subservient and ignorant. Otis's love interest.
- George Kanaan as Behrouz: Frankie's drug contact.
- Nikhil Singh as Kumar Argawal: IT consultant for Anika, finds irregularities in ProsperAus's business practices.
- Jacob Franklin as Caleb: Thaddeus's adherent.
- Fiona Stewart as Madeleine: former ASIO operative, clandestinely works for Airini.
- Lisa Gormley as Caley: Department of Finance public servant, Rowan's assistant.
- Jennifer Rani as Bhvana: code-breaker consulted by Airini.
- Jane Johnson as Tina: Brony's mother, later imprisoned, commits suicide.
- Amy Brown as Josie: answers Airini's phone.
- Nikita Kotlarov as "Russian General"/"Russian Oligarch": poisoned by Young Magda/Johann's boss.
- Robert Shook as Ilya: Johann's henchman.
- Grace Winspear as Rebecca: Elysha's friend, Thaddeus's adherent. Note: Grace is the daughter of Marta Dusseldorp and Ben Winspear.
- Heather Mitchell

'Notes'

== Production ==
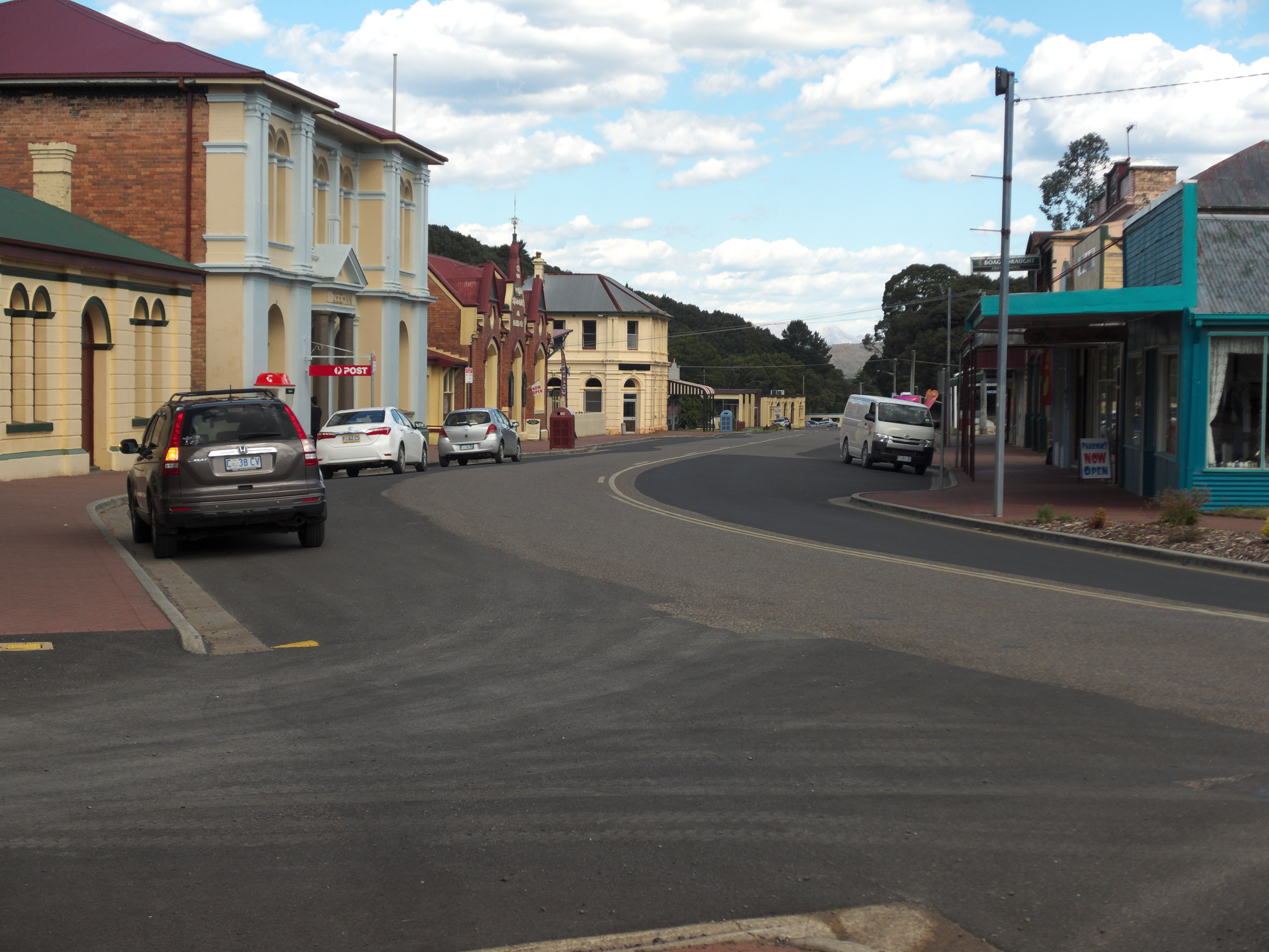
Zeehan's main street, doubles for Mystery Bay's streetscape.

The eight-part first season of the series was created by Andrew Knight, Marta Dusseldorp, and Max Dann, and produced by Archipelago Productions and Fremantle. Archipelago Productions was established by Dusseldorp and her spouse Ben Winspear in 2018 in Hobart. Dusseldorp, a Tasmanian resident (since 2018) and Knight (in Melbourne) formulated the initial premise via Zoom meetings during COVID-19 lockdowns. According to Dusseldorp she "drew from her own realisations about the cultural differences when moving from the big smoke." The series is written by Knight, Dann, and Sarah Bassiuoni.

The series title is a tongue-in-check reference to the actual Bay of Fires on Tasmania's east coast whereas the fictitious Mystery Bay is set near the west coast. Bay of Fires itself is the English name for the location known as larapuna in palawa kani (revived First Nation's language).

The Tasmanian Government via Screen Tasmania provided $1.5 million initial funding in October 2021 to begin production. Additional funding was supplied by ABC, Screen Australia, Film Victoria and Fremantle.

Filming began in June 2022, with various COVID-19 waves disrupting scheduling. Tasmanian locations used were Queenstown: aerodrome (as Junna's Crossing airstrip), interiors, street scenes and main accommodation base for cast and crew; Sandy Bay: big city scenes; Strahan: school and Stella's house and Zeehan: Mystery Bay main street. On location shooting took 16 weeks.

The second season of Bay of Fires received funding from the Tasmanian Government before the first season aired. On 8 February 2024, it was officially renewed for its second season, with filming beginning on 9 May.

== Release ==
The first two episodes of Bay of Fires were previewed at the Sydney Film Festival on 17 June 2023. The first season of the series aired on ABC TV and ABC iview from 16 July 2023. The series began streaming in the UK on ITVX on 23 May 2024.

On 5 May 2025, ABC announced the second season would go to air on 15 June 2025.

== Episodes ==
No.	Title	Directed by	Written by	Original release date	Australia viewers (millions)
1	"Farmed Salmon"	Natalie Bailey	Andrew Knight, Max Dann	16 July 2023	0.384
1983: Vance: Mystery Bay for witness relocations; rejects Airini's concerns. Present: Stella driving children, collides with wallaby. Previously: Anika welcomes managerial staff. Douglas to Anika: less compassion. Kumar to Anika: numerous anomalies, gives USB. Anika dismisses Johann's suspicions about Kumar. Otis disgruntled, minds Iris. Johann tempts Anika; she demurs. Kumar: stay away from work! Anika enters supermarket. Assassins kill employee. Airini saves Anika: not go home; get children. Anika arrives home, warns maid; gets USB. Anika thwarts assassin; maid dead. Johann ordered assassins. Anika collects Iris and Otis: early holidays. Airini: relocation: Mystery Bay; identity: Stella. Airini four SIM cards: emergency only; no contacting others. Present: Stella phones Airini: damaged car. Airini: not emergency. Jeremiah tows family to Connor's: week for repairs. Francis disguises home's problems. Locals stare at Heikkinens. Stella meets Magda and Heather. Stella uses Otis' phone: calls Francis. Tarquin sells clothes. Airini: destroy Otis' phone. Francis drives family. Iris and Otis discover floor holes. Jeremiah provides warm coats. Stella phones Airini: fix holes. Airini: not emergency. Joseph bemoans rising costs. Jeremiah and Jodie cuddle. Stella looks for services. Jodie: no customers, no meals, no phones. Jodie and residents play cards; discuss Stella. Otis disbelieves Stella. Stella falls through floor, finds marijuana.
2	"Crunching the Deal"	Natalie Bailey	Andrew Knight	23 July 2023	0.369
Flashback: Two men observe Francis concreting; burying corpse. Present: Stella wakes; Jeremiah protects her home. Stella and children see Francis hiding under his desk. Old police station destroyed by arson. Otis meets Elysha. Stella reports to Jason in police caravan: found marijuana crop. Thaddeus warns Elysha: no talking; orders Caleb: supervise Elysha. Reg and Kerry shut restaurant as Stella approaches. Jason surrounds marijuana with police tape. Frankie examines Stella; feigns friendliness. Frankie consults Graham: Francis acted alone. Jeremiah repairs Stella's floors. Francis to Graham: woman rang, wanted home for family. Heikkinens stay at motel. Bong's hesitant; Jeremiah convinces her. Iris charms Graham. Connor: clay bird shooting protects Earth from extraterrestrials. Stella buys Reg's Thai food. Frankie's henchmen hunt Francis. Otis and Stella: Thai food inedible. Otis: Stella keeps too many secrets. Sammi and Bong surveil Stella. Jeremiah visits Joseph: take medication. Stella phones Airini: complains about Mystery Bay. Airini: Kumar tortured and killed by Johann. Stella explains situation to Otis. Otis blames Stella: should have ignored anomalies. Iris consoles Stella. Frankie's trucks roll through. Airini watches Johann. Jason surprised: all marijuana removed. Injured Francis tied on chair. Connor returns Stella home. Heikkinens find Francis' corpse.
3	"Road Kill"	Natalie Bailley	Max Dann	30 July 2023	0.292
2010: Tina talks to Brony. Gunman kills Gary, shoots Tina. Present: Brony cuddles baby. Stella sees Francis' cortège; Thaddeus drives coffin's cart. Frankie to Bong: investigate Stella. Stella disgruntled; no inquest. Tarquin: death accidental. Robin: millions to Mystery Bay residents. Rowan sends Robin to Tasmania. Thaddeus disposes of Francis' corpse. Robin to Bong: where's Graham? Bong: dead. Graham: who wants me? Robin: investigating payments; reads list. Graham feigns dementia. Bong to Frankie: Robin's listed names. Frankie negotiates with criminals. Otis annoyed: Stella on school bus. Airini observes assassins. Jeremiah seeks loan extension. Stella mails Kumar's USB to Airini. Connor lies to Robin. Manfred abandons Stella in Strahan. Jeremiah picks her up. Otis notices Elysha's poor reading. Jason cannot help Robin. Magda invents Madeleine's story. Robin asks Frankie about Vicky. Frankie to Bong: Robin works with Stella. Connor offers Francis' car to Stella. Frankie interrogates Stella during dinner. Stella lies. Frankie threatens her. Jodie to Robin: someone else handled payments. Stella receives parcel from Airini. Frankie's gang trace Robin's movements. Stella sees Robin kidnapped. No one responds. Robin caged by Frankie: do not know Stella. Brony helps Stella free Robin. Robin avoids Stella. Stella drives car; collides with Robin.
4	"Punting on the River"	Natalie Bailley	Andrew Knight	6 August 2023	0.269
Jeremiah and Stella rafting with Robin's corpse. hours earlier: Stella returns home, puts Iris to sleep. Stella phones Airini: killed Robin. Airini: dispose of corpse. Stella pays Jeremiah. Present: Stella struggles moving corpse ashore. Jeremiah buries Robin in forest. Stella sleeps on floating raft. Frankie and Arthur discover Robin escaped. Frankie: one of our gang helped. Otis readies Iris for school. Stella disembarks; raft drifts away. Madeleine to Airini: ProsperAus' fraudulence cleverly disguised. Frankie asks Connor: alert her about outsiders. Charlie to Jack: knew your father. Calley to Rowan: Robin's file leads to Vance. Otis sells marijuana; he talks to Elysha. Stella eventually finds forest hut. Frankie's gang search for Robin. Sammi displays CCTV: Stella's ute has Robin's corpse. Airini: arrest Ruslan and Yakov. Jeremiah and Stella share hut overnight. Otis and Iris hide inside marijuana crop. Frankie's gang search home. Jeremiah rafts to town. Stella hides inside gang's truck; gets home. Jodie to Jeremiah: avoid Stella; Frankie's involved. Stella notices Otis' stoned; finds marijuana. Vance to Rowan and Calley: check ASIO. Otis objects as Stella burns marijuana crop. Joseph alerts Jeremiah to fire: crop was Jeremiah's. Airini to Rowan: Robin's dead; forget her. Frankie's gang bring Stella to theatre.
5	"A Caravan in the Nullarbor"	Wayne Blair	Andrew Knight	13 August 2023	0.289
Flashback: Graham coaches Tarquin for his new identity. Present: Frankie presides over Stella's "trial". Iris asks Graham and Joseph to rescue Stella. Most townsfolk vote to kill Stella. Tarquin places plastic bag over her head. Graham stops Tarquin. Stella pitches herself as town's money manager; she's reprieved on trial basis. Jeremiah's against Stella's involvement in Frankie's businesses. Otis travels to school on bus. Airini asks Bhvana to decode Kumar's USB. Graham explains to Stella how town was set up. Frankie's disgruntled by Stella's thwarting her power. Airini unable to interview Ruslan and Yakov without interpreter. Stella updates Airini: needs extricating. Magda to Heather: Stella's from old money; she's going to run off. Frankie to Jeremiah: choose between Stella and me. Stella and Iris celebrate Otis' birthday. Airini consults George over ProsperAus. Otis leads Elysha into cave; they kiss. Jack and Charlie go fishing. Johann gets henchmen released. Frankie's gang burn Jeremiah's boat; Joseph injured. Magda's pig decapitated. Airini to Stalla: go to Junna's Crossing. Stella collects car from Connor; picks up children. Graham dumped in pit. Airini's betrayed: Johann and crew attack. Stella kills pilot who was picking her up; he worked for Johann. Stella's family returns to Mystery Bay.
6	"A Short History of Jesus"	Wayne Blair	Andrew Knight, Max Dann	20 August 2023	0.245
Flashback: Stiles children play hide-and-seek. Johnno locks Eddie in room. Present: Frankie meets her buyer, who senses betrayal. Stella answers Airini's phone call but its Josie; Stella destroys phone. Iris to Stella: Otis lives with Thaddeus. Tarquin finds Graham. Jeremiah visits Joseph in hospital. Stella asks Bethel to see Otis. Otis refuses to return home. Jack to Tina in prison: find snitch or die. Stella sees Jeremiah's burned boat, while Frankie makes veiled threats. Stella visits Joseph and Graham. Graham to Stella: make friends fast. Stella asks Jeremiah to meet later. Johann to Douglas: find Anika. Thaddeus welcomes Otis. Stella desperate for cash; Iris provides Otis' money stash. Frankie and Thaddeus collaborate to control townsfolk. Airini's letter to Stella returns Kumar's USB plus printouts. Frankie to Brony: Tina hanged herself. Stella asks Sammi: decode printouts. Douglas arrives at Iris' school but she refuses to acknowledge him. Iris tells Stella she talks to grandma. Stella confronts Douglas, who admits illegal activities. Sammi: need Johann's password; Stella: Johann quoted Dostoevsky. Jeremiah to Stella: Frankie has drug drop tonight. Stella enlists Magda and Heather. Jeremiah drives Stella and Iris. Thaddeus catches Otis snooping. Jeremiah and Stella sabotage Frankie's drug drop. Buyer shoots at Jack.
7	"Vodka, Borscht and Tears"	Wayne Blair	Max Dann	27 August 2023	0.299
1986 Moscow: Magda poisons General. Present: Frankie's gang search for evidence. Stella wakes alongside Jeremiah; they kiss. Iris enters with breakfast. Magda, Sammi and Heather visit. Frankie threatens Jodie; Jodie alibis Jeremiah. Charlie hides Jack. Magda cracks Kumar's USB code. Jodie to Jeremiah: runaway before Frankie finds out. Frankie orders gang: recheck town's CCTV. Johann's assassins surveil Iris at school. Stella figures out how Johann used ProsperAus to make millions per day. Otis asks Elysha to help escape. Frankie's drug buyer prepares for trouble. Assassins follow school bus to Mystery Bay. Locals dissatisfied with Frankie. Frankie threatens to kill Stella. Ruslan questions locals; they lie. Jeremiah to Jason: tell Frankie: only Jeremiah sabotaged drug drop. Graham helps Stella thwart Ruslan. Jeremiah to Stella: leaving town with Jodie. Jack tells Stella: Thaddeus has Otis. Graham: get Otis out. Stella holds loaded bow at Thaddeus, escapes with Otis and Elysha. Elysha and Iris prepare breakfast for Otis and Stella. Jason tells Frankie: saw Jeremiah with kayak. Magda and Heather poison Ruslan and Yakov with cyanide. Frankie to Thaddeus: Jack's run off. Jodie breaks up with Jeremiah. Jeremiah and Johann meet. Dying Ruslan phones Johann. Stella decides to hijack ProsperAus's money laundering schemes.
8	"Bay of Fires"	Wayne Blair	Andrew Knight, Max Dann	3 September 2023	0.303
Flashback: Anika's parents leave her at department store. Present: Ilya brings Ruslan's phone to Johann. Charlie takes Jack bushwalking; teaches his Indigenous heritage. Johann arrives in Mystery Bay. Connor's lies do not fool Johann. Otis slowly recovers. Sammi to Stella: three Russians arrived. Stella leaves Otis and Iris with Jason. Stella provokes Johann to pursue her; leads them to Frankie's. Both groups start killing each other. Stella saves Frankie's life. Johann survives; threatens Stella but Jason and Connor rescue her. Stella corners Johann. Jeremiah talks Stella out of killing Johann. Jason arrests Johann but once outside, Manfred runs Johann over. Two Weeks Later: Graham plays cards with Iris. Sammi and Stella hijack ProsperAus accounts syphoning money into bogus accounts. Stella visits Frankie in hospital; Frankie rejects truce offer. Joseph dies; Jeremiah mourns. Stella pays off Gurvans' debts. Joseph's funeral pyre set off by Stella. Stella convinces townsfolk to diversify fake accounts. Jack bids goodbye to Frankie. Stella instructs residents in new identities; how to fool bank employees. Locals celebrate their windfalls. Thaddeus orders his adherents to shoot Frankie and Arthur. Manfred steals Stella's money but crashes bus. Stella recovers money. Manfred's bus bursts into flames. Russian oligarch: where's Tasmania?

== Reception ==
=== Critical reception ===
TV Tonight's David Knox rated Bay of Fires at four-out-of-five stars and finds the "backdrop of a fading minetown main street and this colourfully quirky cast is reason enough to get some answers to its perplexing premise." Luke Buckmaster of The Guardian (Australian edition) previewed the first four episodes and was disappointed by their lack of focus: it is an "uninvigorating and weirdly toned on-the-run drama that, even after four episodes, left me wondering what it was trying to be – and why I should keep watching." Screen Hub's Mel Campbell felt the show "reels between comedy and drama in a stressful and frustrating way."

Conversely, Anna Hickey-Moody of The Conversation finds it "arresting, dry and fast-paced" and an exemplar of Australian Gothic by displaying "insights to national understandings of city-country divides and explores small town isolation as a means of social control”. TV Blackbox' Kevin Perry observed it "skilfully blends dark humour and unexpected plot twists into a captivating narrative”. Actor Matt Nable who depicts Thaddeus reflected on the series, "[it's] a really interesting concept and a really different role." Brisbane Times' Bridget McManus praised Rachel House's performance as Airini, who "makes us quake and grin... as a mysterious authority figure."

=== Series One ===
No.	Title	Air date	Overnight ratings		Consolidated ratings		Total viewers	Ref(s)
No.	Title	Air date	Viewers	Rank	Viewers	Rank	Total viewers	Ref(s)
1	"Farmed Salmon"	16 July 2023	384,000	9	724,000	4	1,108,000	
2	"Crunching the Deal"	23 July 2023	369,000	8	700,000	4	1,069,000	
3	"Road Kill"	30 July 2023	292,000	13	609,000	7	901,000	
4	"Punting on the River"	6 August 2023	269,000	14	536,000	6	805,000	
5	"A Caravan in the Nullarbor"	13 August 2023	289,000	10	549,000	7	838,000	
6	"A Short History of Jesus"	20 August 2023	245,000	11	538,000	7	783,000	
7	"Vodka, Borscht and Tears"	27 August 2023	299,000	10	536,000	5	835,000	
8	"Bay of Fires"	3 September 2023	303,000	10	584,000	5	857,000	

=== Series Two ===
No.	Title	Air date	Viewers	ABC iview airdate	Ref
9	"Collective Responsibility"	15 June 2025	437,000	15 June 2025	
10	"The Chosen"	22 June 2025	306,000	15 June 2025	
11	"Arm In Arm"	29 June 2025	284,000	15 June 2025	
12	"Stick To the Recipe"	6 July 2025	240,000	15 June 2025	
13	"Weird Is the new Normal"	13 July 2025	246,000	15 June 2025	
14	"How to save a Life"	20 July 2025	237,000	15 June 2025	
15	"Bury Me Deep"	27 July 2025	237,000	15 June 2025	
16	All's Well That Ends"	3 August 2025	249,000	15 June 2025	

=== Awards and nominations ===
Year	Award	Category	Nominee	Result	Ref.
2024	AACTA Awards	Best Television Drama Series	Marta Dusseldorp, Yvonne Collins, Archipelago/Frenantle	Nominated	
2024	Screen Producers Australia	Drama Series Production of the Year	Bay of Fires	Nominated	

== Home media ==
The first season of Bay of Fires was released on DVD from Acorn Media on 13 September 2023.
