= Only the Brave =

Only the Brave may refer to:

- Only the Brave (1930 film), an American Civil War drama
- Only the Brave (1994 film), an Australian film
- Only the Brave (2006 film), an American independent film set during World War II
- Only the Brave (2017 film), an American film about wildfire firefighters
- "Only the Brave" (song)
- OTB Group, parent company of a number of fashion brands

== See also ==
- Lonely the Brave, an English rock band
