= Gordon Davie =

Australian rules footballer, born 1903

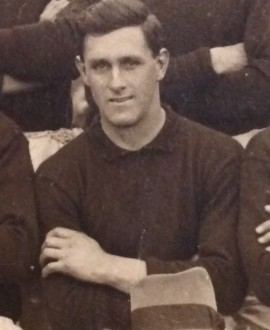
- Davie in 1924

Personal information
- Full name: Samuel Gordon Davie
- Born: 7 July 1903; Trentham, Victoria
- Died: 18 February 1941 (aged 37); Trentham, Victoria
- Original team: Trentham
- Height: 170 cm (5 ft 7 in)
- Weight: 67 kg (148 lb)

Playing career^{1}
Years	Club	Games (Goals)
1924	Collingwood	2 (0)
- ^{1} Playing statistics correct to the end of 1924.

Samuel Gordon Davie (7 July 1903 – 18 February 1941) was an Australian rules footballer who played with Collingwood in the Victorian Football League (VFL).
