= Christos Tsiolkas =

Australian author

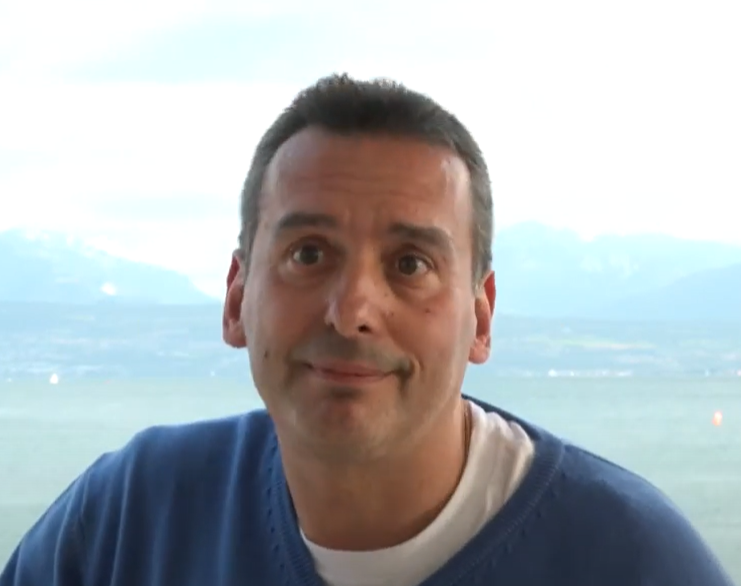
- Christos Tsiolkas in 2015
- Born: 1965; Melbourne, Victoria, Australia
- Education: University of Melbourne
- Occupations: Author, playwright, screenwriter

Christos Tsiolkas is an Australian author, playwright, and screenwriter. He is especially known for The Slap, which was both well-received critically and highly successful commercially. Several of his books have been adapted for film and television.

== Early life ==
Tsiolkas was born and raised in Melbourne with his Greek immigrant parents, and was educated at Blackburn High School. Tsiolkas completed his Arts Degree at the University of Melbourne in 1987.

He co-edited the student newspaper Farrago in 1987.

== Career ==
Tsiolkas' first novel, Loaded (1995), about an alienated gay youth in Melbourne, was adapted as the feature film Head On (1998) by director Ana Kokkinos, starring Alex Dimitriades.

His fourth novel, The Slap, was published in 2008, and won several awards as well as being longlisted for the Man Booker Prize and shortlisted for the Miles Franklin Award. It was also highly successful commercially; it was the fourth-highest selling book by an Australian author in 2009.

== Awards ==
- 1999: AWGIE Award for Stage, for Who’s Afraid of the Working Class? (with Andrew Bovell, Patricia Cornelius, and Melissa Reeves)
- 2006: The Age Fiction Book of the Year
- 2009: ABIA Book of the Year.
- 2009: ALS Gold Medal, for The Slap
- 2009: Commonwealth Writers Prize, overall winner for best book, for The Slap
- 2009: Nielsen BookData Booksellers' Choice Award, for The Slap
- 2009: Victorian Premier's Literary Awards, Vance Palmer Prize for Fiction, for The Slap
- 2020: Victorian Premier's Prize for Fiction, for Damascus (2019)
- 2021: Melbourne Prize for Literature

== Personal life ==
Tsiolkas is gay and identifies as a self-proclaimed "wog." He is a Richmond Football Club supporter and of Greek heritage.

== Books ==
- Loaded (1995)
- Jump Cuts (with Sasha Soldatow, 1996)
- The Jesus Man (1999)
- The Devil's Playground (2002)
- Dead Europe (2005)
- The Slap (2008)
- Barracuda (2013)
- Merciless Gods (2014)
- Damascus (2019)
- 7 1/2 (2021)
- The In-Between (2023)

== Theatre ==
- Who's Afraid of the Working Class? (with Andrew Bovell, Melissa Reeves and Patricia Cornelius, 1999)
- Elektra AD (1999)
- Viewing Blue Poles (2000)
- Fever (with Andrew Bovell, Melissa Reeves and Patricia Cornelius, 2002)
- Dead Caucasians (2002)
- Non Parlo di Salo (with Spiro Economopoulos, 2005)
- The Hit (with Netta Yashin 2006)
- The Audition (with Melissa Reeves, Milad Norouzi, Patricia Cornelius, Sahra Davoudi, Tes Lyssiotis and Wahibe Moussa, produced by Outer Urban Projects, 2019 and 2024)
- Loaded (adapted from the book, with Dan Giovannoni, 2023)

== Screenplays ==
- Thug (1998), short film, with Spiro Economopoulos)
- Saturn's Return (2001), (Note: Not to be confused with other plays and films of the same name) a telemovie starring Joel Edgerton and Damian Walshe-Howling
- Little Tornadoes (2021), co-written with director Aaron Wilson

== Film and TV adaptations ==
- The play Who's Afraid of the Working Class? (1999) was made into the film Blessed (2009), directed by Ana Kokkinos.
- Loaded was first published in 1995 and was adapted into the 1998 film Head On, starring Alex Dimitriades.
- The 2006 novel Dead Europe was made into the film Dead Europe (2012), directed by Tony Krawitz and starring Kodi Smit-McPhee.
- The Slap has been turned into both an Australian and U.S. television miniseries.
- Barracuda was adapted for television in 2016.
