= Loaded (novel) =

1995 novel by Christos Tsiolkas

- First Australian edition
- Author: Christos Tsiolkas
- Language: English
- Genre: novel
- Set in: Melbourne
- Publisher: Vintage Books
- Publication date: 1995
- Publication place: Australia
- Media type: Print (paperback)
- Pages: 160
- ISBN: 9780143790976
- Followed by: Jump Cuts

Loaded is the first novel by Greek-Australian writer Christos Tsiolkas. It was first published in 1995 by Vintage Books, and focuses on Ari, a nineteen-year-old second generation Greek-Australian in Melbourne. It follows a restless, unemployed Ari over twenty four hours as he spirals into drug use and casual sex. He is caught between the conservatism of his Greek background and modern Australia amid his homosexual desire.

In 1998, it was adapted by Greek-Australian director Ana Kokkinos for the film, Head On. Greek-Australian actor, Alex Dimitriades plays the protagonist, Ari.

== Plot ==
The novel describes twenty-four hours in the life of Ari, an angst-ridden, young, gay second generation Greek Australian. Ari lives with his family in the Melbourne neighbourhood of Richmond and travels across taking speed, cocaine and marijuana whenever presented to him. He is uncomfortable with his homosexuality; he favours hook-ups with anonymous, masculine suitors who debase or demean their own homosexuality; and he is regularly at odds with friends as well as family.

== Publication ==
When Tsiolkas submitted the manuscript of Loaded to an independent publisher, it was rejected as "racist and homophobic".

It was ultimately published by Vintage Books.

== Adaptations ==
Loaded was adapted as an audio play by the Malthouse Theatre company in 2020. A stage adaptation of the novel premiered on 5 May 2023 at the Malthouse Theatre. It was also adapted into film Head On directed by Ana Kokkinos in 1998.
