= Alex Dimitriades =

Australian actor (born 1973)

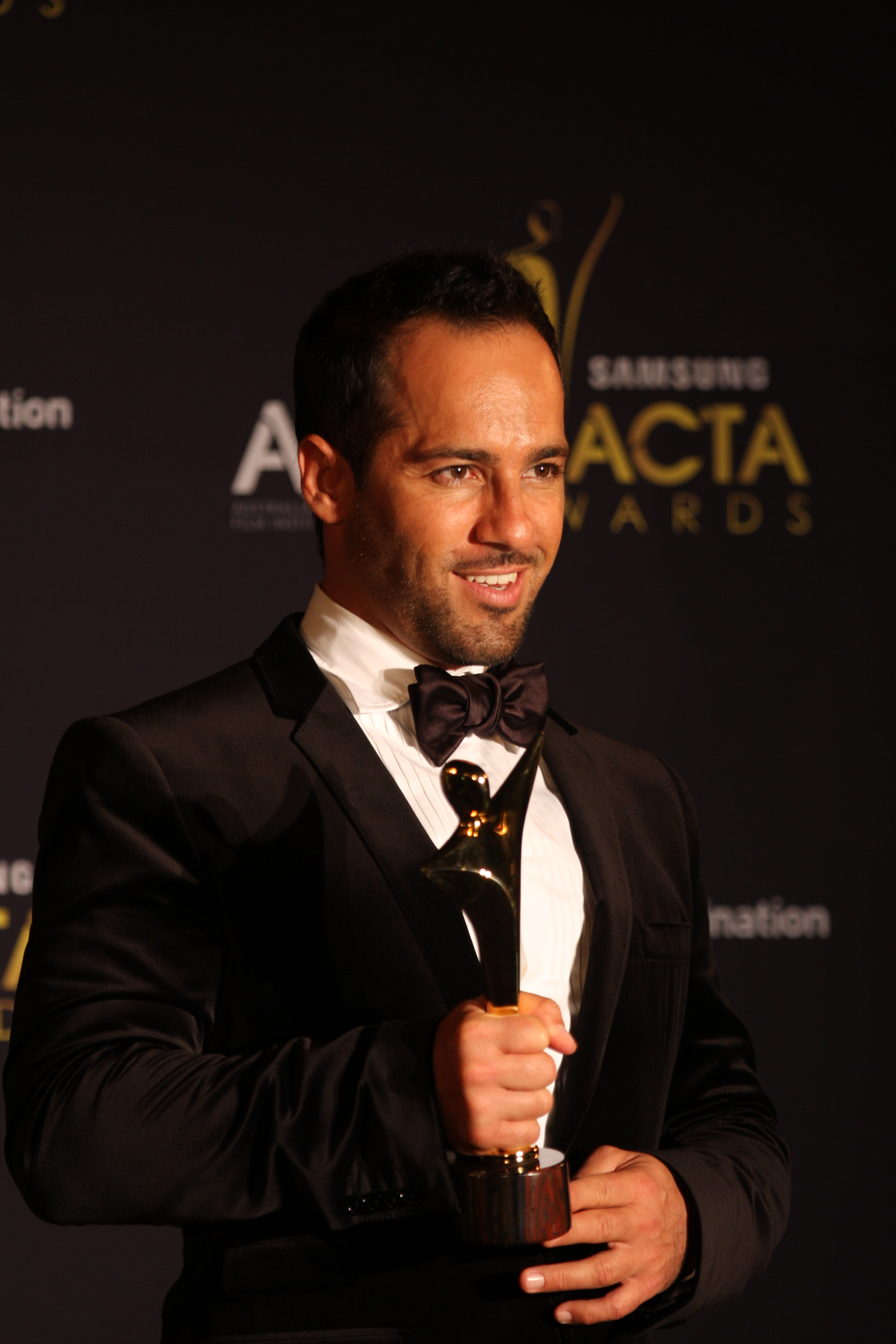
- Dimitriades with his AACTA Award, 2012
- Born: Alexandros Dimitriades; 28 December 1973 (age 52); Sydney, New South Wales, Australia
- Occupations: Actor, DJ
- Years active: 1993–present

Alex Dimitriades (Greek: Αλέξανδρος Δημητριάδης, romanized: Aléxandros Dimitriádis; born 28 December 1973) is an Australian television, film and stage actor of Greek descent. He is perhaps best known for his roles as Nick Polides in the 1993 romantic comedy film The Heartbreak Kid and as Nick Poulos in the 1994 television teen drama spin-off Heartbreak High. He won critical acclaim for his role as Ari, a troubled second generation Greek Australian in Head On (1998), based on Christos Tsiolkas's 1995 novel, Loaded. He won the Film Critics Circle of Australia award for Best Actor for the role and was nominated for the AFI Award for Best Actor. He later starred in The Slap (2011) based on Tsiolkas's novel of the same name and won the AACTA Award for Best Lead Actor. He also starred in the titular role of the drama series, The Principal (2015) and won the Logie Award for Most Outstanding Actor. He has also had roles in a number of British-Australian co-productions such as The Cry (2018) and The Tourist (2022).

== Early life ==
Dimitriades was born in Sydney, as Alexandros Dimitriades. He is the son of first generation Greek immigrants and the youngest of three siblings. He has a brother, George, and a sister, Melinda. He grew up in Earlwood, Sydney. His parents divorced when he was 12. His mother worked as a legal secretary, and she raised the children as a single mother.

== Career ==
=== Film ===
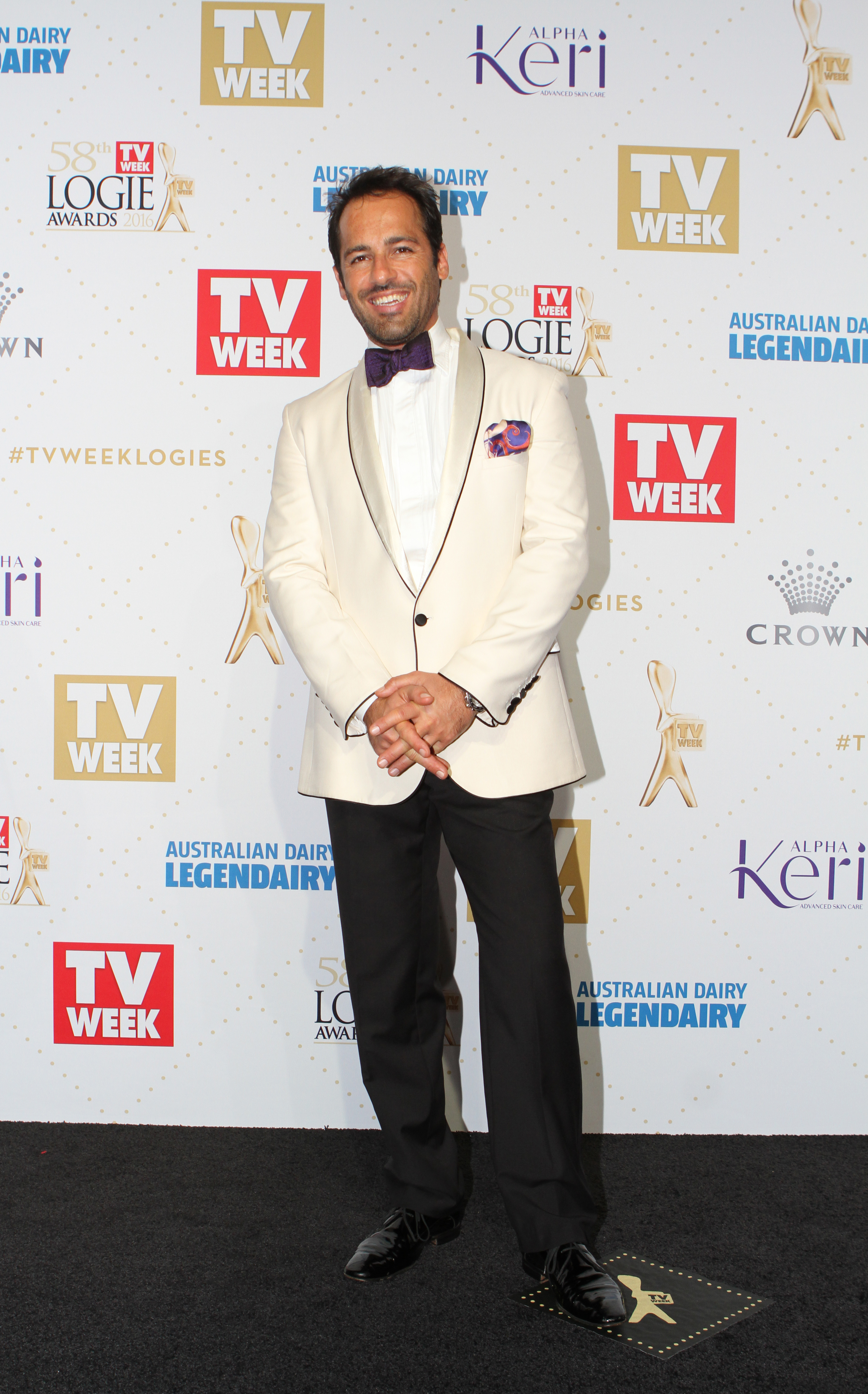
Dimitriades at the 2016 Logie Awards

Dimitriades first attracted national attention for his co-starring role as Nick Polides in the 1993 Australian romantic comedy film The Heartbreak Kid, for which he received positive reviews and acclaim.

In 1998, he played the protagonist Ari in the Ana Kokkinos film Head On, based on the book Loaded by Christos Tsiolkas. Dimitriades' performance in the role was critically acclaimed and earned him an AFI Award nomination. The film was controversial for its graphic violence, sex scenes and LGBT subject matter, but it earned mostly positive reviews. It screened at dozens of festivals around the world, including the Director's Fortnight at the 1998 Cannes Film Festival.

His other film roles include the Australian comedies Let's Get Skase (2001) and La Spagnola (2001), the Greek film To Gamilio Party (English title Bang Bang Wedding, 2008), Wog Boy 2: Kings of Mykonos (2010), and Summer Coda starring with Rachael Taylor. He had roles in the Hollywood films Ghost Ship (2002) and Deuce Bigalow: European Gigolo (2005).

In 2015, he co-starred in Ruben Guthrie with Patrick Brammall.

=== Television ===
After making his acting debut in the film The Heartbreak Kid, he starred in a television spin-off Heartbreak High, in which he played Nick Poulos. He went on to play underworld figure, Warren Lanfranchi, in the 1995 drama television series Blue Murder. The following year, Dimitriades played estate agent Steve George in the television soap opera Neighbours. In 1997, he took a role in the police drama Wildside.

In 2002, he appeared in Young Lions. In years to follow, he had a small guest role in the Australian science fiction series Farscape. In 2008, Dimitriades starred in the drama series Underbelly.

In 2011, he featured in The Slap, the TV adaptation of the novel of the same name by Christos Tsiolkas. He was awarded the AACTA Award for Best Lead Actor in a Television Drama for his role as the protagonist, Harry. In 2015, he starred in The Principal, a SBS four-part crime drama screened over two weeks in October, for which he won a Logie Award. The series received positive reviews and various accolades, including several nominations from the Australian Film Institute in 2016. He appeared in the shows Secret City and Seven Types of Ambiguity.

In late 2018, Dimitriades had a recurring role in the BBC One drama The Cry as Detective Peter Alexiades and in the Netflix series Tidelands, again playing a police officer.

In 2021, Dimitriades appeared in the second season of ABC drama Total Control (TV series) in the role of Nice Pearce. Dimitriades also appeared in Channel 9 drama Amazing Grace (Australian TV series) as Kirk.

In 2022, Dimitriades played the Greek gangster, Kosta, in the TV series The Tourist with Jamie Dornan and Danielle Macdonald.

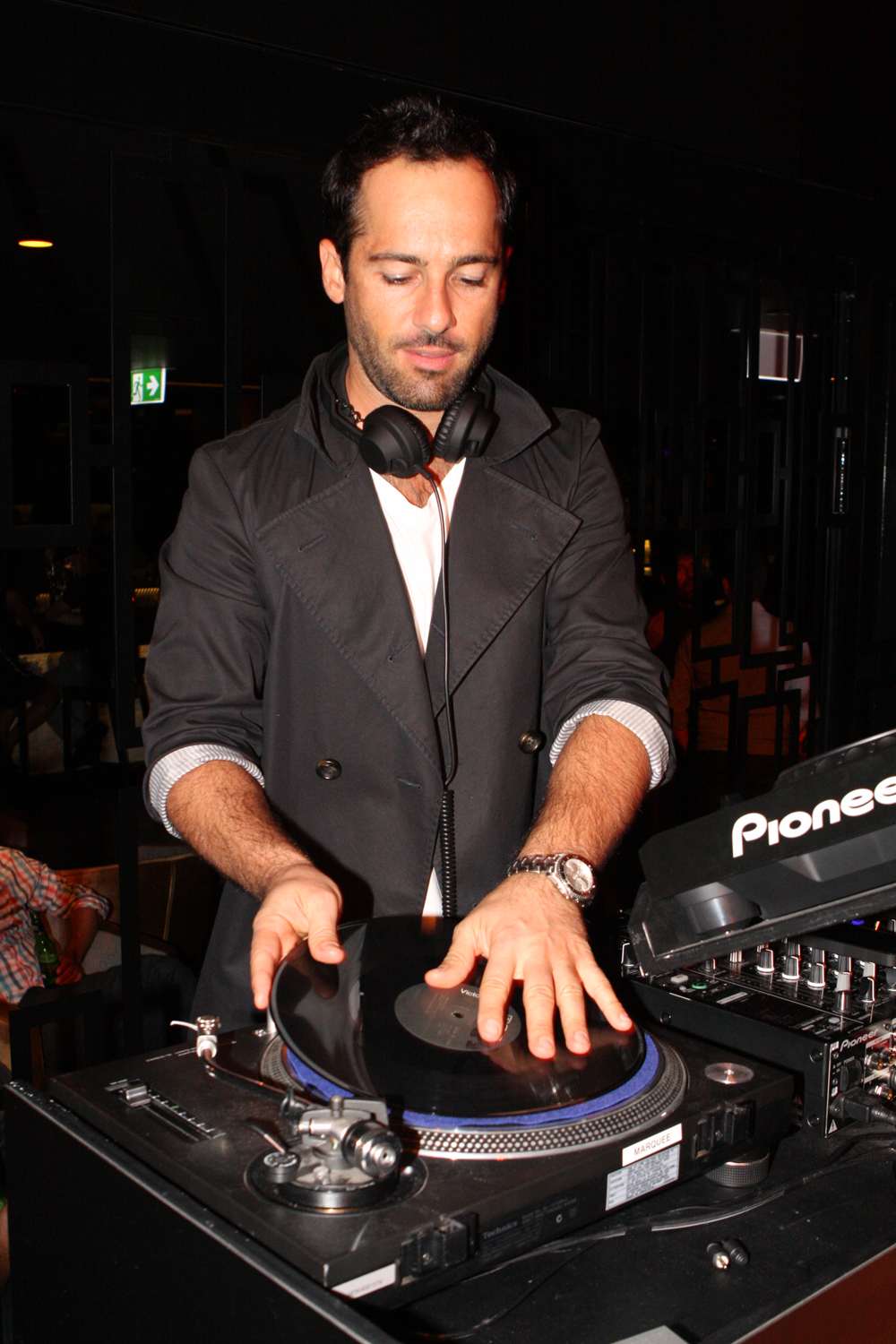
Dimitriades DJing at an event in 2012

=== Theatre ===
In 1996 and 1997, Dimitriades, along with Nick Giannopoulos and Vince Colosimo, toured as part of the Wogboys comedy stage shows.

Dimitriades has appeared in many theatre productions, including two plays by Louis Nowra for Griffin Theatre Company, The Woman with Dog's Eyes (2004) and The Emperor of Sydney (2006); The Nightwatchman (2007) and Rain Man in 2010; and the Melbourne Theatre Company’s production of Glengarry Glen Ross in 2014.

=== DJ ===
Dimitriades, an avid collector of vinyl records, has stated that his love of music started in childhood. He has a passion for both hip hop and dance music and has stated he is inspired by Kings Go Forth because of their "’70s sound." He works as a DJ professionally across Australia, often referred to as DJ Boogie Monster. Dimitriades has headlined and performed at numerous events, including Derby Day, and as the headline act for the relaunch of the popular South Melbourne nightclub Motel.

Although Dimitriades is primarily known as an actor, his DJ work predates his acting work:

It's partly my fault, I was a DJ before I was an actor, but I wasn't known and haven't been known as one. It's two sides of me that will never go away.”

== Filmography ==
=== Film ===
| Year | Title | Role | Notes |
|---|---|---|---|
| 2021 | At Last | Eric | |
| 2018 | My Boy Oleg | Ari | Short |
| 2017 | Remembering Agatha | Robert | Short |
| 2015 | Ruben Guthrie | Damian | |
| 2014 | The Orchard | Saverio | Short |
| 2014 | The Infinite Man | Terry | |
| 2010 | Summer Coda | Michael | |
| 2010 | Wog Boy 2: Kings of Mykonos | Mihalis | |
| 2008 | Three Blind Mice | Tony | |
| 2008 | To gamilio party | Ilias | |
| 2007 | Touched By Fellini | Tony | Short |
| 2006 | Loveproof | | Short |
| 2006 | Checkpoint | Theo | Short |
| 2006 | Love Thy Neighbours | Peter | Short |
| 2005 | Deuce Bigalow: European Gigolo | Enzo Giarraputo | |
| 2003 | Subterano | Conrad | |
| 2002 | Ghost Ship | Santos | |
| 2001 | Let’s Get Skase | Danny D'Amato | |
| 2001 | La Spagnola | Stefano | |
| 1998 | Deflated | | Short |
| 1998 | Head On | Ari | |
| 1993 | The Heartbreak Kid | Nick Polides | |

=== Television ===
| Year | Title | Role | Notes |
|---|---|---|---|
| 2026 | The F Ward | Stefan | TV series: 1 episode |
| 2025 | Bay of Fires | Allessandro | TV series; (S2) 2 episodes |
| 2023–25 | Strife | Daniel | TV series; regular |
| 2022 | The Tourist | Kostas Panigiris | TV series; 4 episodes |
| 2021 | Total Control | Nick Pearce | TV series; 6 episodes |
| 2021 | Amazing Grace | Kirk Gilbert | TV series; 8 episodes |
| 2020 | The End | Dr. Nikos Naoumidis | TV series; 9 episodes |
| 2019 | Epiphany | Theo | TV movie |
| 2018 | Tidelands | Sergeant Paul Murdoch | TV series; 7 episodes |
| 2018 | The Cry | Detective Peter Alexiades | TV series; 4 episodes |
| 2017 | Wake in Fright | Evan 'Doc' Tydon | TV miniseries; 2 episodes |
| 2017 | Seven Types of Ambiguity | Joe Marin | TV miniseries; 6 episodes |
| 2016 | Secret City | Charles Dancer | TV series; 6 episodes |
| 2016 | Wanted | Anton Maric | TV series; 2 episodes |
| 2015 | The Principal | Matt Bashir | TV miniseries; 4 episodes |
| 2014 | Carlotta | Angelo | TV movie |
| 2011 | The Slap | Harry | TV miniseries; 8 episodes |
| 2010 | Rescue: Special Ops | Guy Hewitt | TV series; 1 episode |
| 2008 | Underbelly | Victor Brincat (Mr.T in original broadcast) | TV series; 5 episodes |
| 2007 | Love My Way | Julien | TV series; 1 episode |
| 2006 | Stepfather of the Bride | Jack | TV movie |
| 2006 | Two Twisted | Rolly | TV series; 1 episode |
| 2006 | The Society Murders | Robert Nazaretian | TV movie |
| 2004 | Go Big | Hamish Fitz-herbert | TV movie |
| 2002 | Young Lions | Det Snr Constable Eddie Mercia | TV series; 23 episodes |
| 2000 | The Love of Lionel's Life | Steve | TV movie |
| 2000 | Farscape | Lieutenant Velorek | TV series; 1 episode |
| 1998–99 | Wildside | Charlie Coutous | TV series; 44 episodes |
| 1996 | Neighbours | Steve George | TV series; 18 episodes |
| 1996 | G.P. | Luke Papadopoulos | TV series; 1 episode |
| 1995 | Blue Murder | Warren Lanfranchi | TV miniseries; 2 episodes |
| 1994 | Heartbreak High | Nick Poulos | TV series; 38 episodes |

== Theatre ==
| Year | Title | Role | Notes |
|---|---|---|---|
| 1996 | Wogboys | | Universal Theatre, Melbourne, Enmore Theatre, Sydney |
| 2000 | The Caribbean Tempest | | Royal Botanic Garden, Sydney |
| 2004 | The Woman With Dog’s Eyes | Todd | Stables Theatre, Sydney with Griffin Theatre Company |
| 2005 | Hurlyburly | | Stables Theatre, Sydney with The Group Theatre |
| 2005 | Love Letters | Andrew Makepeace III | NIDA Parade Theatre, Sydney |
| 2006 | The Emperor of Sydney | Todd | Stables Theatre, Sydney with Griffin Theatre Company |
| 2007 | The Nightwatchman | | Stables Theatre, Sydney with Griffin Theatre Company |
| 2010 | Rain Man | Charlie Babbitt | Ensemble Theatre, Sydney |
| 2014 | Glengarry Glen Ross | Richard ‘Ricky’ Roma | Southbank Theatre, Melbourne with MTC |
| 2023 | Loaded | | Malthouse Theatre, Melbourne |

== Personal life ==
Dimitriades had an 8-year relationship with Terry Biviano in the late 1990s and early 2000s.

In 2004, a portrait of Dimitriades by Michael Zavros, was a finalist in the Archibald Prize. The portrait is now displayed at the National Portrait Gallery in Canberra.

In 2008, Dimitriades was arrested driving under the influence. It was reported that he had a blood alcohol reading of .11, more than twice the legal limit in Australia. The charge resulted in the suspension of his driver's licence.

In September 2009, his mother died after a long-time illness.
