= Ana Kokkinos =

Australian filmmaker

- Born: Melbourne, Victoria, Australia
- Occupations: Director, screenwriter
- Years active: 1990s–present

Ana Kokkinos is an Australian film and television director and screenwriter of Greek descent. She is known for her breakthrough feature film Head On (1998), and has directed television shows such as The Secret Life of Us, The Time of Our Lives and Ten Pound Poms.

The Guardian wrote: "Kokkinos's cinematic oeuvre is among the most hard-hitting bodies of work in Australian cinema."

== Early life and education ==
Kokkinos was born in Melbourne and before her career in film, she worked as an industrial lawyer.

In 1991, she was accepted into the Victorian College of the Arts' graduate film and television programme.

== Career ==
=== Early work ===
Kokkinos' career began with Antamosi (1992), a short film she directed while in her first year of film school, which examines a migrant family's relationship told from the perspective of three generations of women. Coming from a Greek immigrant family herself, Kokkinos's work often deals with themes of identity and family.

Her next film was the 50-minute short feature Only the Brave (1994)s. This film follows Alex as she helplessly watches her best friend Vicki fall victim to her self-destructive tendencies.

=== 1998 to 1999: Breakthrough with Head On ===
In Head On (1998), Kokkinos explores the relationship between the city and the individual. Head On follows Greek-Australian teenager Ari as he wanders the streets of Melbourne, struggling with his identity as a gay male and the identity his family wishes to thrust upon him.

Head On divided the Greek community in Australia. Kokkinos said in an interview with the Los Angeles Times. Kokkinos said "what it did is that it opened up a dialogue between younger Greeks and their parents. What the film has done is that it has broken down barriers."

The film was adapted from the novel Loaded, written by Christos Tsiolkas, and it received numerous awards, including Best First Feature in the San Francisco International Lesbian and Gay Film Festival as well as Best Film at the Milan International Lesbian and Gay Film Festival.

=== 2000s to the present ===
Her next film The Book of Revelation (2006) was adapted from a novel of the same name written by Rupert Thomson. In The Book of Revelation, Daniel leaves his house to buy cigarettes but is abducted by three masked women who then subject him to physical and emotional abuse. The women also repeatedly rape Daniel. The Book of Revelation was nominated by the Australian Film Institute for Best Screenplay.

Blessed (2009) deals with the relationship between mother and child, occurring during the span of 24 hours. Blessed was nominated by the Australian Film Institute for Best Adapted Screenplay in 2009.

In May 2022, the BBC and Stan commissioned Kokkinos to direct Ten Pound Poms (2023-2025), a drama about the British citizens who migrated to Australia after the Second World War.

== Personal life ==
Kokkinos is openly lesbian. She realised she was gay at the age of 15. In an interview with the Los Angeles Times, she said "I went through a very long process of having to come to terms with that, and that wasn't easy, but I don't think it's easy for anyone". However, she rejects the tag "lesbian filmmaker", saying that she is able to represent all kinds of characters on screen. She has been in a long-term relationship with collaborator, Mira Robertson, since the 1980s.

== Selected filmography ==
- Anatamosi (1992)
- Only the Brave (1994)
- Head On (1998)
- The Book of Revelation (2006)
- Blessed (2009)
- The Hunting (2019, TV mini-series)
- Here Out West (2021, co-director, with Leah Purcell and others)

== See also ==
- List of female film and television directors
- List of lesbian filmmakers
- List of LGBT-related films directed by women
