= AACTA Award for Best Adapted Screenplay =

Australian film award

Best Adapted Screenplay AACTA Award
- Country: Australia
- Presented by: Australian Academy of Cinema and Television Arts (AACTA)
- First award: 1978
- Currently held by: Robert Connolly, Harry Cripps, The Dry (2021)
- Website: http://www.aacta.org

The AACTA Award for Best Adapted Screenplay is an award presented by the Australian Academy of Cinema and Television Arts (AACTA), for an Australian screenplay "based on material previously released or published". Prior to the establishment of the academy in 2011, the award was presented by the Australian Film Institute (AFI) at the annual Australian Film Institute Awards (more commonly known as the AFI Awards). It was first handed out in 1978 when the award for Best Screenplay (which was first presented at the 1974-75 awards) was split into two categories: Best Original Screenplay and Best Adapted Screenplay. The award has since been presented intermittently from 1978 to 1979, 1983–1987, 1989, 1993–2003, 2005–2006, and then from 2008–present.

== Winners and nominees ==
In the following table, the years listed correspond to the year of film release; the ceremonies are usually held the same year. The films and screenwriters in bold and in yellow background have won are the winners. Those that are neither highlighted nor in bold are the nominees. When sorted chronologically, the table always lists the winning screenplay first and then the other nominees.

Winner marked in a separate colour

Year	Film	Screenwriter(s)	Source
**1970s**
**1978**	**The Getting of Wisdom**	**Eleanor Witcombe**	**The novel of the same name by Henry Handel Richardson**
**1978**	The Chant of Jimmie Blacksmith	Fred Schepisi	The novel of the same name by Thomas Keneally
**1978**	The Mango Tree	Michael Pate	The novel of the same name by Ronald McKie
**1978**	Weekend of Shadows	Peter Yeldham	The novel The Reckoning by Hugh Atkinson
**1979**	**My Brilliant Career**	**Eleanor Witcombe**	**The novel of the same name by Miles Franklin**
**1979**	Cathy's Child	Ken Quinnell	The novel A Piece of Paper by Dick Wordley
**1979**	The Last of the Knucklemen	Tim Burstall	The novel of the same name by John Power
**1979**	Money Movers	Bruce Beresford	The novel of the same name by Devon Minchin
**1980s**
**1983**	**Careful, He Might Hear You**	**Michael Jenkins**	**The novel of the same name by Sumner Locke Elliott**
**1983**	Now and Forever	Richard Cassidy	The novel of the same name by Danielle Steel
**1983**	The Wild Duck	Tutte Lemkow, Dido Merwin, Henri Safran and Peter Smalley	The play of the same name by Henrik Ibsen
**1983**	The Year of Living Dangerously	Christopher Koch, Peter Weir and David Williamson	The novel of the same name by Koch
**1984**	**Annie's Coming Out**	**John Patterson and Chris Borthwick**	**The novel of the same name by Rosemary Crossley & Anne McDonald**
**1984**	BMX Bandits	Patrick Edgeworth	A story by Russell Hagg
**1984**	Razorback	Everett De Roche	The novel of the same name by Peter Brennan
**1984**	Strikebound	Richard Lowenstein	The novel Dead Men Don't Dig Coal by Wendy Lowenstein
**1985**	**Bliss**	**Peter Carey and Ray Lawrence**	**The novel of the same name by Carey**
**1985**	An Indecent Obsession	Denise Morgan	The novel of the same name by Colleen McCullough
**1985**	The Coca-Cola Kid	Frank Moorhouse	The short stories The Americans, Baby & The Electrical Experience by Moorhouse
**1985**	Rebel	Michael Jenkins and Bob Herbert	The play No Names, No Pack Drill by Herbert
**1986**	**The Fringe Dwellers**	**Bruce Beresford and Rhoisin Beresford**	**The novel of the same name by Peter Carey**
**1986**	For Love Alone	Stephen Wallace	The novel of the same name by Christina Stead
**1986**	Kangaroo	Evan Jones	The novel of the same name by D. H. Lawrence
**1986**	Playing Beatie Bow	Peter Gawler	The novel of the same name by Ruth Park
**1987**	**Travelling North**	**David Williamson**	**The play of the same name by Williamson**
**1987**	The Place at the Coast	Hilary Furlong	The novel of the same name by Jane Hyde
**1987**	Slate, Wyn & Me	Don McLennan	The novel of the same name by Georgia Savage
**1987**	Vincent	Paul Cox	Based on the letters of Vincent van Gogh
**1989**	**Evil Angels**	**Robert Caswell and Fred Schepisi**	**The novel of the same name by John Bryson**
**1989**	Compo	Abe Pogos	The play of the same name by Pogos
**1989**	Dead Calm	Terry Hayes	The novel of the same name by Charles F. Williams
**1989**	Emerald City	David Williamson	The play of the same name by Williamson
**1990s**
**1993**	**Blackfellas**	**James Ricketson**	**The novel of the same name by Archie Weller**
**1993**	Black River	Kevin Lucas	The opera of the same name by Andrew & Julianne Schultz
**1993**	No Worries	David Holman	The play of the same name by Holman
**1993**	The Silver Brumby	John Tatoulis and Jon Stephens	The children's book series of the same name by Elyne Mitchell
**1994**	**The Sum of Us**	**David Stevens**	**The play of the same name by Stevens**
**1994**	Country Life	Michael Blakemore	The play Uncle Vanya by Anton Chekhov
**1994**	Everynight ... Everynight	Ray Mooney and Alkinos Tsilimidos	The play of the same name by Mooney
**1994**	Traps	Robert Carter and Pauline Chan	The novel Dreamhouse by Kate Grenville
**1995**	**Hotel Sorrento**	**Richard Franklin and Peter Fitzpatrick**	**The play of the same name by Hannie Rayson**
**1995**	Dad and Dave: On Our Selection	George Whaley	Based on the characters created by Steele Rudd
**1995**	Sanctuary	David Williamson	The play of the same name by Williamson
**1995**	That Eye, the Sky	John Ruane and Jim Barton	The novel of the same name by Tim Winton.
**1996**	**Cosi**	**Louis Nowra**	**The play of the same name by Nowra**
**1996**	Dead Heart	Nick Parsons	The play of the same name by Parsons
**1996**	Life	John Brumpton and Lawrence Johnston	The play Containment by Brumpton
**1996**	What I Have Written	John A. Scott	The novel of the same name by Scott
**1997**	**The Well**	**Laura Jones**	**The novel of the same name by Elizabeth Jolley**
**1997**	Blackrock	Nick Enright	The play of the same name by Enright
**1997**	Love in Ambush	Carl Schultz	The novel Jarai by Loup Durand
**1998**	**The Boys**	**Stephen Sewell**	**The play of the same name by Gordon Graham**
**1998**	Head On	Andrew Bovell, Ana Kokkinos and Mira Robertson	The novel Loaded by Christos Tsiolkas
**1998**	Oscar and Lucinda	Laura Jones	The novel of the same name by Peter Carey
**1998**	Radiance	Louis Nowra	The play of the same name by Nowra
**1999**	**Praise**	**Andrew McGahan**	**The novel of the same name by McGahan**
**2000s**
**2000**	**Looking for Alibrandi**	**Melina Marchetta**	**The novel of the same name by Marchetta**
**2000**	Chopper	Andrew Dominik	The autobiographies of Mark "Chopper" Read
**2000**	The Magic Pudding	Harry Cripps, Greg Haddrick and Simon Hopkinson	The children's book of the same name by Norman Lindsay
**2001**	**Lantana**	**Andrew Bovell**	**The play Speaking In Tongues by Bovell**
**2001**	He Died with a Felafel in His Hand	Richard Lowenstein	The novel of the same name by John Birmingham
**2001**	The Monkey's Mask	Anne Kennedy	The novel of the same name by Dorothy Porter
**2001**	Silent Partner	Daniel Keene	The play of the same name by Keene
**2002**	**Australian Rules**	**Paul Goldman and Phillip Gwynne**	**The novel Deadly, Unna? by Gwynne**
**2002**	Molokai: The Story of Father Damien	John Briley	The biography of the same name by Hilde Eynikel
**2002**	Rabbit-Proof Fence	Christine Olsen	The non-fiction book Follow the Rabbit-Proof Fence by Doris Pilkington Garimara
**2002**	Swimming Upstream	Tony Fingleton	The memoir of the same name by Diane & Tony Fingleton
**2003**	**The Rage in Placid Lake**	**Tony McNamara**	**The play The Cafe Latte Kid by McNamara**
**2003**	Blurred	Stephen Davies and Kier Shorey	The play of the same name by Davis
**2003**	Ned Kelly	John Michael McDonagh	The novel Our Sunshine by Robert Drewe
**2003**	Teesh and Trude	Vanessa Lomma	The play of the same name by Wilson McCaskill
**2005**	**Three Dollars**	**Robert Connolly and Elliot Perlman**	**The novel of the same name by Perlman**
**2005**	Hating Alison Ashley	Christine Madafferi	The novel of the same name by Robin Klein
**2005**	The Illustrated Family Doctor	David Snell and Kriv Stenders	The novel of the same name by Robert Drewe
**2005**	The Widower	Lyndon Terracini	The poems Evening Alone at Bunyah, Noonday Axeman, The Widower in the Country, Cowyard Gates & The Last Hellos by Les Murray
**2006**	**Candy**	**Neil Armfield and Luke Davies**	**The novel Candy: A Novel of Love and Addiction by Davies**
**2006**	The Book of Revelation	Andrew Bovell and Ana Kokkinos	The novel of the same name by Rupert Thomson
**2006**	Jindabyne	Beatrix Christian	The short story So Much Water So Close to Home by Raymond Carver
**2006**	Last Train to Freo	Reg Cribb	The play The Return by Cribb
**2008**	**Unfinished Sky**	**Peter Duncan**	**Based on the film The Polish Bride by Kees van der Hulst**
**2008**	All My Friends Are Leaving Brisbane	Stephen Vagg	The play of the same name by Vagg
**2009**	**Balibo**	**Robert Connolly and David Williamson**	**The non-fiction book Cover-Up by Jill Jolliffe**
**2009**	Beautiful Kate	Rachel Ward	The novel of the same name by Newton Thornburg
**2009**	Blessed	Andrew Bovell, Patricia Cornelius, Melissa Reeves and Christos Tsiolkas	The play Who's Afraid of the Working Class? by Bovell
**2009**	Mao's Last Dancer	Jan Sardi	The memoir of the same name by Li Cunxin
**2010s**
**2010**	**Tomorrow, When the War Began**	**Stuart Beattie**	**The novel of the same name by John Marsden**
**2010**	The Boys Are Back	Allan Cubitt	The memoir The Boys Are Back in Town by Simon Carr
**2010**	Bran Nue Dae	Reg Cribb, Rachel Perkins and Jimmy Chi	The musical of the same name by Chi
**2010**	The Tree	Julie Bertuccelli	The novel Our Father Who Art in the Tree by Judy Pascoe
**AACTA Awards**
**2011** (1st)	**Snowtown**	**Shaun Grant**	**Based on the true story of the Snowtown murders**
**2011** (1st)	The Eye of the Storm	Judy Morris	The novel of the same name by Patrick White
**2011** (1st)	The Hunter	Alice Addison	The novel of the same name by Julia Leigh
**2011** (1st)	Red Dog	Daniel Taplitz	The novel of the same name by Louis de Bernières
**2012** (2nd)	**The Sapphires**	**Tony Briggs and Keith Thompson**	**The play of the same name by Briggs**
**2012** (2nd)	Lore	Robin Mukherjee and Cate Shortland	The novel The Dark Room by Rachel Seiffert
**2013** (3rd)	**The Great Gatsby**	**Baz Luhrmann and Craig Pearce**	**The novel of the same name by F. Scott Fitzgerald**
**2013** (3rd)	Adoration	Christopher Hampton	The short story collection The Grandmothers by Doris Lessing
**2013** (3rd)	Dead Europe	Louise Fox	The novel of the same name by Christos Tsiolkas
**2013** (3rd)	The Turning	The Turning Ensemble	The short story collection of the same name by Tim Winton
**2014** (4th)	**The Railway Man**	**Frank Cottrell Boyce and Andy Paterson**	**The memoir of the same name by Eric Lomax**
**2014** (4th)	Predestination	The Spierig Brothers	The novel All You Zombies by Robert A. Heinlein
**2015** (5th)	**Last Cab to Darwin**	**Reg Cribb and Jeremy Sims**	**The play of the same name by Cribb**
**2015** (5th)	Holding the Man	Tommy Murphy	The memoir of the same name by Timothy Conigrave
**2015** (5th)	Ruben Guthrie	Brendan Cowell	The play of the same name by Cowell
**2016** (6th)	**The Daughter**	**Simon Stone**	**The play The Wild Duck by Henrik Ibsen**
**2016** (6th)	Girl Asleep	Matthew Whittet	The play of the same name by Whittet
**2017** (7th)	**Lion**	**Luke Davies**	**The memoir A Long Way Home by Saroo Brierley & Larry Buttrose**
**2017** (7th)	Berlin Syndrome	Shaun Grant	The novel of the same name by Melanie Joosten
**2017** (7th)	Don't Tell	Anne Brooksbank, Ursula Cleary and James Greville	Based on the true story
**2017** (7th)	Jasper Jones	Shaun Grant and Craig Silvey	The novel of the same name by Silvey
**2018** (8th)
**2018** (8th)	**Boy Erased**	**Joel Edgerton**	**The memoir Boy Erased: A Memoir by Garrard Conley**
**2018** (8th)	Breath	Simon Baker, Gerard Lee and Tim Winton	The novel of the same name by Winton
**2018** (8th)	Cargo	Yolanda Ramke	Based on the short film of the same name by Ramke
**2018** (8th)	Ladies in Black	Bruce Beresford and Sue Milliken	The novel The Women in Black by Madeleine St John
**2021** (11th)
**2021** (11th)	**The Dry**	**Robert Connolly and Harry Cripps**	**The novel of the same name by Jane Harper**
**2021** (11th)	Penguin Bloom	Shaun Grant and Harry Cripps	The novel of the same name by Bradley Trevor Greive
**2021** (11th)	Peter Rabbit 2	Patrick Burleigh and Will Gluck	Based on the stories of Peter Rabbit created by Beatrix Potter
**2021** (11th)	Rams	James Duncan	Based on the film of the same name by Grímur Hákonarson

== See also ==
- AACTA Award for Best Original Screenplay
- AACTA Award for Best Screenplay, Original or Adapted
- AACTA Award for Best Screenplay in a Short Film
- Australian Film Institute Award for Best Screenplay
- AACTA Awards
