= Hulda Jakobsdóttir =

Icelandic mayor

Hulda Dóra Jakobsdóttir (1911 – 1998) was the first woman in Iceland to become a mayor. She served as mayor of Kópavogur from 1957 to 1962, where she actively influenced the town's development. In the 1970 elections, she was elected as a councillor for the Union of Liberals and Leftists, serving until 1974.

== Biography ==
Born in Reykjavík on 21 October 1911, Hulda Dóra Jakobsdóttir was the daughter of the engineer Jakob Guðjón Bjarnason and his wife Guðrún Sesselja Ármannsdóttir. She was the eldest of five siblings. After completing high school in Reykjavík, she studied at the University of Iceland where she earned a master's degree (cand.phil.) in 1932.

In 1938, she married Finnbogi Rútur Valdimarsson. Two years later they moved to Marbakki in Kópavogur where they raised five children. Both she and her husband became involved in the administrative affairs of Kópavogur which gained the status of a town in 1955. Hulda was elected mayor on 4 June 1957 and remained in office until 1962. She was the first woman in Iceland to become a mayor. Under her leadership, the town developed considerably with a school, Kópavogskirkja church, social centre and swimming pool. She also served as a local representative in Kópavogur from 1970 to 1974.

For her services to local government, she was honoured with the Order of the Falcon in 1994. She died at Marbakki on 31 October 1998.
