= Rams (2020 film) =

2020 Australian film directed by Jeremy Sims

- Theatrical movie poster
- Directed by: Jeremy Sims
- Written by: Jules Duncan
- Based on: Rams by Grímur Hákonarson
- Produced by: Janelle Landers; Aidan O'Bryan
- Starring: Sam Neill; Michael Caton; Miranda Richardson
- Cinematography: Steve Arnold
- Edited by: Marcus D'Arcy
- Music by: Antony Partos
- Production company: WBMC
- Distributed by: Roadshow Films
- Release dates: 27 August 2020 (CinefestOZ); 29 October 2020
- Running time: 115 minutes
- Country: Australia
- Language: English
- Box office: $4,376,781

Rams is a 2020 Australian comedy-drama film directed by Jeremy Sims, written by Jules Duncan, and starring Sam Neill, Michael Caton, and Miranda Richardson. It is based on the Icelandic drama film Rams (2015) by Grímur Hákonarson.

The film premiered at the CinefestOZ Film Festival on 27 August 2020. Rams was released in Australian cinemas on 29 October 2020 to generally positive reviews.

At the 2021 ARIA Music Awards, the album was nominated for Best Original Soundtrack, Cast or Show Album.

== Synopsis ==
In remote Western Australia, two estranged brothers, Colin (Sam Neill) and Les (Michael Caton), are at war. Raising separate flocks of sheep descended from their family’s prized bloodline, the two men work side by side yet are worlds apart. When Les’s prize ram is diagnosed with a rare and lethal illness, authorities order a purge of every sheep in the valley. While Colin attempts to stealthily outwit the powers that be, Les opts for angry defiance. But can the warring brothers set aside their differences and have a chance to reunite their family, save their flock, and bring their community back together?

— Roadshow Films

== Cast ==
- Sam Neill as Colin
- Michael Caton as Les
- Miranda Richardson as Kat
- Asher Keddie as Angela
- Wayne Blair as Lionel
- Leon Ford as De Vries
- Asher Yasbincek as Sally

== Production ==
Rams is the first produced screenplay of writer Jules Duncan, a former TV reporter for Channel 9 and regional network GWN. While the film is based on the Icelandic film of the same name, director Jeremy Sims says the Australian version is a "complete reinterpretation of the original". The film reunites Sims with star Michael Caton and several crew members from his previous feature, Last Cab to Darwin. Caton and co-star Sam Neill previously worked together in the 1976 TV series The Sullivans.

Shooting started on 1 October 2018. All filming took place in Mount Barker, Western Australia. Caton and New Zealander Neill were announced as the film's leads in October 2018. English actress Miranda Richardson joined in November 2018. The production included several Dorset Horn sheep, a rare and endangered breed recognised for their distinctively curved-horns. The film's score is by Antony Partos, an Australian film and TV composer who worked on Animal Kingdom, The Rover and the 2011 TV drama The Slap.

== Release ==
On 17 July 2020, Rams was announced as the opening film of the 2020 CinefestOZ Film Festival. The film premiered at the CineFestOZ Film Festival in Busselton, Western Australia on 27 August 2020.

After numerous delays, Rams was released in Australian cinemas on 29 October 2020.

== Reception ==
=== Box office ===
Rams debuted at number one at the Australian box office, earning $568,722 throughout the country on its opening weekend. The film has earned $3,624,786 at the Australian box office with a further $748,290 in New Zealand and $3,705 in Russia, bringing its total worldwide gross to $4,376,781.

=== Critical reception ===
Rams has received generally favourable reviews from critics. Review aggregator Rotten Tomatoes reports that 91% of 54 critics gave the film a positive review, with an average rating of 6.8/10. The site's critical consensus reads, "A rare remake that preserves the heart of the original, Rams draws on the chemistry of its talented veteran stars to explore complicated – and often comedic – sibling ties."

Luke Buckmaster of The Guardian said that, "At the heart of the picture are two very appealing performances from Neill and Caton, who feel even from early moments like real, lived-in characters, well cast to reflect their differences as actors." Leigh Paatsch of the Herald Sun said, "At times, it is as charming a (blackish) comedy as they come. At others, it is a strikingly well-observed drama."

=== Accolades ===
Award	Ceremony date	Category	Subject	Result	Ref
AACTA Awards	3 November 2020	Best Actor	Sam Neill	Nominated	
AACTA Awards	8 December 2021	Best Film	Janelle Landers	Nominated	
AACTA Awards	8 December 2021	Best Film	Aidan O'Bryan	Nominated	
AACTA Awards	8 December 2021	Best Adapted Screenplay	Jules Duncan	Nominated	
AACTA Awards	8 December 2021	Best Supporting Actor	Michael Caton	Nominated	
AACTA Awards	8 December 2021	Best Original Music Score	Antony Partos	Nominated	
AACTA Awards	8 December 2021	Best Costume Design	Tess Schofield	Nominated	
