= Last Cab to Darwin =

2003 play by Reg Cribb

- Original language: English
- Written by: Reg Cribb
- Characters: Max; Polly; Doctor; Julie; 3 female, 5 male; variable cast, 34 roles
- Subject: Euthanasia
- Genre: Drama/Comedy
- Setting: Australia

Premiere
- Date: 2003; 23 years ago

Last Cab to Darwin is a 2003 Australian drama/comedy stage play written by Reg Cribb and based upon the true story of taxi driver Max Bell who was diagnosed with terminal stomach cancer in the early 1990s. The 2003 production was presented both at the Sydney Opera House and the Octagon Theatre in Perth.

== Plot ==
Taking advantage of the controversial Rights of the Terminally Ill Act 1995 in the Northern Territory, Rex decides to end his own life with dignity. His request under the law is in bitter dispute but Rex sells up everything he owned, says goodbye to his neighbor and good friend Polly, and drives the great distance from Broken Hill, New South Wales to Darwin, Northern Territory where taking his own life would be legal.

== Cast ==
The cast of the 2003 production was:

- Barry Otto - Rex
- Jacki Weaver - Dot, Backpacker 2, Mrs Gratton, Diedre
- Justine Saunders - Polly, Mrs Chester-Burnham
- Steve Rodgers - Doctor, Simmo, Publican (off), Bob, Jack, Canadian Backpacker, Curly
- Michael Tuahine - Tilly, Reporter 2 - The Telegraph, Beano, Shadow, Mr Speaker, Reporter 2 (scene 15), Afghan, Sledger
- Darren Gilshenan - Reporter 4 - Broken Hill Times, Doug, Barman, Mr Stanton, Reporter 3 (scene 15), Truckie, Afghan, Soldier
- Alan Dukes - Reporter 1 - The Herald, Ces, Ted, Canadian Backpacker, Mr Pembroke, Reporter 4 (scene 15) Afghan, Stan
- Kirsty Hillhouse - Reporter 3 - The Australian, Mrs Brown, GP, Fran, Backpacker 1, Mrs Stilton, Reporter 1 (scene 15), Afghan, Shirl

== Critical reception ==
Variety wrote that the story of Rex Bell's journey was "a great premise for drama".

Bryce Hallett of Sydney Morning Herald wrote that the play was "a big-hearted, sprawling, dry-humoured, unwieldy saga which splendidly evokes the landscape of knotted trees, furnace sunsets and the dual feeling of liberation and terror on the journey from Broken Hill to Darwin."

Adelaide Review wrote "It is not surprising that playwright Reg Cribb saw the story of Max Bell as ready-made for the telling. It has all the elements of a mythic quest with a sturdy, self-deprecating hero meeting a host of different characters as he travels a last time through his native land."

In their announcement of casting in 2012 for a production of the play, director Steve Wiegerink of Off the Leash Theatre stated "Both humorous and tragic, Last Cab to Darwin proves once again why Reg Cribb is one of Australia's best playwrights."

== Awards and nominations ==
- 2002, Winner of Patrick White Playwrights Award
- 2003, winner of Queensland Premier's Literary Award Best Drama Play
- 2003, winner of Western Australian Premier's Award for best script
- 2003, nominated for Louis Esson Prize for Drama
- 2005, winner of Drovers Australian Performing Arts Centres Association Excellence in Touring for 'Excellent Audience Response'
- 2005, winner of Drovers Australian Performing Arts Centres Association Excellence in Touring for 'Touring Excellence'

== Film adaptation ==
Last Cab to Darwin is also the title of an Australian comedy-drama biopic directed and produced by Jeremy Sims and based on the 2003 play of the same name by Reg Cribb. Actors Michael Caton and Jacki Weaver have starring roles in the film. Central to the plot is the controversial theme of voluntary euthanasia.

The script for the film was adapted as a screenplay by Sims and Cribb. Sims' association with Reg Cribb began when his production company, Pork Chop Productions produced the successful stage version of Last Cab. In 2006, Sims directed Last Train to Freo, an adaptation of Cribb's The Return. The film was given the green-light by Screen Australia in October 2013 as one of six films to share in $5.4 million government funding.

In 2012, it was confirmed that Michael Caton has been cast for the lead role and Jacki Weaver, who played several parts in the stage production, will also have a major role. Ningali Lawford will play Polly, Rex's neighbour. By February 2014, actress Emma Hamilton had joined the cast. Hamilton plays an English nurse, engaging in backpacker tourism. It was earlier reported that the producers had been in discussions with Rebel Wilson for this role.
