= Max Bell (disambiguation) =

Max Bell was a Canadian businessman.

Max Bell may also refer to:

- Max Bell Centre (Calgary), an ice hockey arena in Calgary, Alberta, Canada
- Max Bell Centre (Winnipeg), a multipurpose sports facility in Winnipeg, Manitoba, Canada
- Max Bell, inspiration for the play and film Last Cab to Darwin
