= Jeremy Sims =

Australian film director

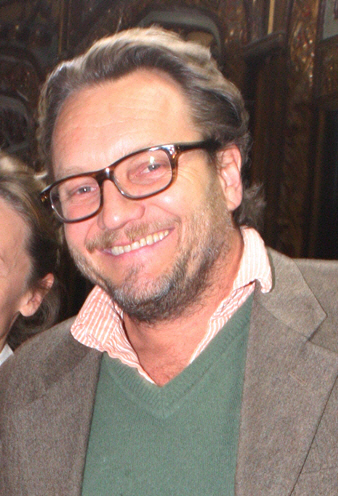
- Sims at The Sapphires Hometown Gala Premiere at State Theatre, Sydney in August 2012
- Born: Jeremy Hartley Sims; 10 January 1966 (age 60); Perth, Western Australia, Australia
- Education: Wesley College (1977–1983); National Institute of Dramatic Art (1990)
- Occupations: Actor, director
- Years active: 1980–present
- Known for: Chances (1991–1992); Idiot box (1996); Fireflies (2004)
- Spouse(s): Tania Leimbach (m.2015); Samantha Lang (m.2004–div.2011)
- Partner: Kym Wilson (1990s)
- Children: 4

Jeremy Hartley Sims (born 10 January 1966) is an Australian actor and director.

== Early life ==
Jeremy Sims was born in Perth, Western Australia on 10 January 1966, and was educated at Wesley College from 1977 to 1983.

In 1987, Sims was studying at University of Western Australia (UWA). He graduated in 1990 from the National Institute of Dramatic Art (NIDA) in Sydney, with a degree in Performing Arts (Acting).

== Career ==
Sims' first appearance on the big screen was a minor part in the 1980 movie Harlequin. He is however, remembered by many for his role as Alex Taylor in the risqué television soap opera Chances from 1991 to 1992, in which he was cast the year after graduating from NIDA. He was nominated for a Logie Award for Most Popular New Talent for the role in 1992.

Sims has starred in several films, including playing Mick, opposite Ben Mendelsohn's Kev in 1996 crime film Idiot Box. It was his first lead role in a feature film, and saw him nominated for Best Actor at both the Australian Film Institute Awards and the Film Critics Circle of Australia Awards. Other film credits include 2003 film Liquid Bridge with Ryan Kwanten, 2003 Ned Kelly satire Ned, 2009 drama The Waiting City with Radha Mitchell, 2015 romantic drama Ruben Guthrie with Patrick Brammall, 2017 adventure comedy A Few Less Men and 2018 quirky comedy drama Swinging Safari, opposite Guy Pearce and Kylie Minogue.

Sims' television appearances include the 1997 made-for-television film Kangaroo Palace, which earned him an Australian Film Institute Award nomination for AACTA Award for Best Lead Actor in a Television Drama. In 1999, he appeared in Aftershocks, a mockumentary TV movie about the 1989 Newcastle earthquake. He won an Australian Film Institute Award and was nominated for a Logie Award for his portrayal of John Constable. That same year he featured in the miniseries Day of the Roses, based on the Granville rail disaster and the TV movie Secret Men's Business alongside Ben Mendelsohn, Simon Baker and Marcus Graham. In 2001, he played Tony Dunne MP in the satirical miniseries Corridors of Power. In 2004, he starred in Fireflies as Tim 'Backa' Burke. He had recurring roles in Home and Away in 2009 as David ‘Gardy’ Gardiner and Wild Boys in 2011 as Francis Fuller. He starred in the 2009 TV film In Her Skin with Guy Pearce. He has also had numerous guest roles in series including Police Rescue Wildside, Medivac, Farscape, Young Lions, Stingers, The Secret Life of Us, McLeod's Daughters. and the Underbelly franchise.

Sims is also a director, with no less than five feature films credits to his name. He directed and produced 2006 thriller Last Train to Freo, which received three Australian Film Institute Award nominations. In 2010, his second feature, the war drama Beneath Hill 60 was nominated for 12 AFI Awards, five Inside Film Awards, and eight Film Critics Circle of Australia Awards, including for Best Director and Best Film. He won the Alfred P. Sloan Prize at the Hamptons International Film Festival.

In 2014, Sims directed, produced and co-wrote the film adaptation of Last Cab to Darwin, based on the 2003 play of the same name. Starring Michael Caton and Jacki Weaver, it received numerous AACTA Awards nominations. including Best Director and won the AACTA Award for Best Adapted Screenplay, and was selected for Toronto International Film Festival in 2015. In 2018, he wrote and directed the feature documentary Wayne (about motorsport champion Wayne Gardner) which was selected for Melbourne International Film Festival that year. He also directed 2020 film Rams, starring Sam Neill, Michael Caton, and Miranda Richardson, which was met with international acclaim.

His director credits for television include 2021 six-part Amazon Prime miniseries Back to the Rafters (spin-off and sequel to long-running drama series Packed to the Rafters) and eight-part medical rescue series RFDS from 2021 to 2023, in which he also appeared. He has also directed episodes of Doctor Doctor, A Place to Call Home, Rescue: Special Ops and Home and Away.

Sims is also developing several projects, including six part series Bluebird (produced by his company Pork Chop Productions) and the drama series Fight or Flight – The Woman who Cracked the Anxiety Code, a drama series, based on a best selling biography by Judith Hoare.

Sims has also acted in and directed stage productions at Sydney Theatre Company, Belvoir and Melbourne Theatre Company, as well as overseas at Trafalgar Studios in London and Brooklyn Academy of Music in New York. In 1995, together with then girlfriend Kym Wilson, Sims formed the theatrical production company 'Pork Chop Productions'. Pork Chop has toured many shows nationally since that time and won a Drover's Award in 2005 for their production of the play, Last Cab to Darwin. His stage acting credits include Philip Seymour Hoffman's production of Riflemind, and the Edinburgh Festival / Royal National Theatre Company production of The Secret River.

Sims continues to act in selected projects, including the final season of comedy crime drama series Mr Inbetween in 2021. In February 2025, he was announced as part of the cast for the second season of historical heist drama series The Artful Dodger.

== Acting credits ==
=== Film ===
Year	Title	Role	Notes	Ref
1980	Harlequin	Young boy	Feature film	
1991	Placenta	Boy	Short film	
1996	Idiot Box	Mick	Feature film	
2000	City of Dreams	Walter Burley Griffin	Feature film	
2001	Tick	Jack	Short film	
2003	Liquid Bridge	Tony	Feature film	
2003	Ned	Mr Kelly	Feature film	
2009	The Waiting City	Carlisle	Feature film	
2015	Ruben Guthrie	Ray	Feature film	
2017	A Few Less Men	Pilot Ridgeon	Feature film	
2018	Swinging Safari	Bob Marsh	Feature film	
2019	Bilched	Matt's Dad		

=== Television ===
Year	Title	Role	Notes	Ref
1991–1992	Chances	Alex Taylor	126 episodes	
1994	Police Rescue	Terry	TV movie	
1994	Heartland	Garth Maddern	2 episodes	
1995	Police Rescue	Jeff Bertram	1 episode	
1996	Natural Justice: Heat	Gavin Larsen	TV movie	
1997	Kangaroo Palace	Jack Gill	TV movie	
1997	Frontline	Steve Barrett	1 episode	
1998	Wildside	Greg Zelka	1 episode	
1998	Medivac	Mark Best	4 episodes	
1998	The Day of the Roses	Gerry Buchtmann	Miniseries	
1998	The Chosen	Peter McAlister	TV movie	
1999	Aftershocks	John Constable	TV movie	
1999	Secret Men's Business	Warwick Jones	TV movie	
1999–2000	Farscape	Rorf	3 episodes	
1999–2003	Stingers	Troy Thorpe / Aaron Fielder	4 episodes	
2000	The Lost World	Vorded	1 episode	
2001	The Bill	Ken McEvoy	1 episode	
2001	Corridors of Power	Tony Dunne MP	6 episodes	
2002	Young Lions	Rob Carne	3 episodes	
2003	Balmain Boys	Andy	TV movie	
2003	The Secret Life of Us	Neil	3 episodes	
2004	Fireflies	Tim Burke	22 episodes	
2005	McLeod's Daughters	Will Hamiltion	1 episode	
2008	Blue Water High	Loren's Dad	1 episode	
2008	In Her Skin	McLean	TV movie	
2009	Home and Away	David Gardiner	15 episodes	
2010	City Homicide	Pete Copland	1 episode	
2011	Wild Boys	Francis Fuller	10 episodes	
2011	Underbelly Files: The Man Who Got Away	Tony Moynihan	TV movie	
2012	Dangerous Remedy	Bertram Wainer	TV movie	
2016	Doctor Doctor	Mike	1 episode	
2020	Black Comedy		1 episode	
2021	Mr Inbetween	Rafael	5 episodes	
2025	The Artful Dodger	Uncle Dickie	Season 2	
2025	Sunny Nights	Lachlan Jennings	TBA	
2026	The F Ward	Dr Geoffrey Friedman	TV series:3 episodes	

=== Theatre ===
Year	Title	Role	Notes	Ref
1986	Chicago Chicago		New Dolphin Theatre, Perth with UWA	
1992	Love Letters	Andrew Makepeace III	Sydney Opera House with Les Currie Presentations / STC	
1993	Aftershocks	John	Belvoir Theatre Company	
1994	The Grapes of Wrath	Tom Joad	Playhouse, Melbourne with MTC	
1994	All Souls	Frank	Stables Theatre, Sydney with Griffin Theatre Company	
1994	Picasso at the Lapin Agile	Pablo Picasso	Malthouse Theatre, Melbourne Playhouse, Adelaide, Belvoir St Theatre, Sydney with Company B / Playbox Theatre Company	
1995	Twelfth Night	Sebastian	University of Sydney, Monash University, Melbourne, Melbourne Athenaeum, Canberra Theatre, Playhouse, Adelaide with Bell Shakespeare	
1995	Pericles	Pericles	University of Sydney, Monash University, Melbourne, Melbourne Athenaeum, Canberra Theatre, Playhouse, Adelaide with Bell Shakespeare	
1995; 1997	Rosencrantz and Guildenstern Are Dead	Guildenstern	Comedy Theatre, Melbourne, Belvoir St Theatre, Sydney, with Pork Chop Productions	
1997	The Herbal Bed		Wharf Theatre, Sydney, with STC	
1998	Macbeth		Space Theatre, Adelaide with STCSA	
1999	Cyrano de Bergerac	Cyrano	Wharf Theatre, Sydney with STC	
2000–2001	The White Devil	Flamineo	Theatre Royal Sydney, Brooklyn Academy of Music with STC	
2001	Hamlet	Hamlet	Belvoir Theatre Company with Pork Chop Productions	
2002	The Virgin Mim	Mr McDermott, Mim's father	Wharf Theatre, Sydney, with STC	
2003	The Club		Sydney Opera House with STC	
2005	Festen	Michael	Sydney Opera House with STC	
2006	Under Ice		Wharf Theatre, Sydney, with Wharf 2 Loud	
2007–2009	Riflemind	Sam	Wharf Theatre, Sydney, with STC / Trafalgar Studios, London	
2009	God of Carnage	Michael (replaced by Russell Dykstra)	STC	
2011	Celebrity Autobiography	Comedian	Sydney Opera House with Ross Mollison Productions	
2013; 2019	The Secret River	Smasher Sullivan	Sydney Theatre, Playhouse, Canberra, His Majesty's Theatre, Perth, Edinburgh Festival, National Theatre London, NT tour with STC	

== Directing / writing credits ==
=== Film ===
Year	Title	Role	Notes	Ref
2006	Last Train to Freo	Director / executive producer	Feature film	
2010	Beneath Hill 60	Director	Feature film	
2015	Last Cab to Darwin	Director / producer / co-writer	Feature film	
2018	Wayne	Director / writer	Documentary film	
2020	Rams	Director	Feature film	

=== Television ===
Year	Title	Role	Notes	Ref
2011	Rescue: Special Ops	Director	2 episodes	
2016	Doctor Doctor	Director	4 episodes	
2017–2018	A Place to Call Home	Director	6 episodes	
2021	Back to the Rafters	Director	2 episodes	
2021; 2023	RFDS	Director	2 episodes	
2022	Home and Away	Director	10 episodes	
TBA	Bluebird			
TBA	Fight or Flight – The Woman who Cracked the Anxiety Code			
TBA	The Star of the Sea		In development	
TBA	Everything I Never Did	Director	In development	

=== Theatre ===
Year	Title	Role	Notes	Ref
1995	Rosencrantz and Guildenstern Are Dead	Director / producer	Belvoir Theatre Company with Pork Chop Productions	
1996; 2000	Stow and the Dragon	Director	Stables Theatre, Sydney, Seymour Centre, Sydney with Pork Chop Productions	
1998	Wank	Producer	Old Fitzroy Theatre, Sydney, with Pork Chop Productions / Theatre Hydra	
1999	The Wild Duck	Director	Playhouse, Adelaide, Glen St Theatre, Sydney with STCSA / Pork Chop Productions	
1999	Night of the Sea Monkey	Producer	Old Fitzroy Theatre, Sydney, with Pork Chop Productions / Theatre Hydra	
2001	Borderlines	Director	Stables Theatre, Sydney, Riverina Playhouse with Griffin Theatre Company	
2001	Hamlet	Director / producer	Belvoir Theatre Company with Pork Chop Productions	
2002	The Return	Director	Rechabite Hall, Perth with Perth Theatre Company	
2003	The Shape of Things	Director	Wharf Theatre, Sydney, with STC	
2003–2004	Last Cab to Darwin	Director	Australian tour with Black Swan Theatre Company / HotHouse Theatre	
2004	The Unlikely Prospect of Happiness	Director	Sydney Theatre with STC	
2005	Ruby's Last Dollar	Director	Sydney Opera House, Octagon Theatre, Perth with Pork Chop Productions / Black Swan Theatre Company	
2007	Little Britain Live	Director	Vodafone Arena, Melbourne	
2007; 2008–2009	Brilliant Monkey	Director	Darlinghurst Theatre, Sydney, Old Fitzroy Theatre, Sydney, Riverside Theatres Parramatta with Tamarama Rock Surfers / Pork Chop Productions	

== Awards ==
Year	Work	Award	Category	Result	Ref
1992	Chances	Logie Award	Most Popular New Talent	Nominated	
1997	Idiot Box	Australian Film Institute Award	Best Performance by an Actor in a Leading Role	Nominated	
1997	Idiot Box	Film Critics Circle of Australia Award	Best Actor	Nominated	
1997	Kangaroo Palace	Australian Film Institute Award	Best Actor in a Leading Role in a Television Drama	Nominated	
1999	Aftershocks	Australian Film Institute Award	Best Actor in a Leading Role in a Television Drama	Won	
1999	Aftershocks	Logie Award	Silver Logie Award for Best Actor	Nominated	
2005	Last Cab to Darwin	Drover's Award (with Pork Chop Productions)	Best Theatre Production	Won	
2010	Beneath Hill 60	Australian Film Institute Award	Best Director	Nominated	
2010	Beneath Hill 60	Australian Film Institute Award	Best Film	Nominated	
2010	Beneath Hill 60	Inside Film Award	Best Director	Nominated	
2010	Beneath Hill 60	Inside Film Award	Best Film	Nominated	
2010	Beneath Hill 60	Film Critics Circle of Australia Award	Best Director	Nominated	
2010	Beneath Hill 60	Australian Directors' Guild Award	Best Direction in a Feature Film	Nominated	
2010	Beneath Hill 60	Hamptons International Film Festival	Alfred P. Sloan Prize for Best Feature Film	Won	
2015	Last Cab to Darwin	AACTA Award	Best Director	Nominated	
2015	Last Cab to Darwin	AACTA Award	Best Adapted Screenplay	Won	
2015	Last Cab to Darwin	AACTA Award	Best Film	Nominated	
2015	Last Cab to Darwin	AWGIE Award	Best Feature Film Adaptation	Nominated	
2015	Last Cab to Darwin	Sydney Film Festival	Best Narrative Feature	Nominated (First runner-up)	
2015	Last Cab to Darwin	Toronto International Film Festival		Selected	
2015	Last Cab to Darwin	Film Critics Circle of Australia Award	Best Film	Nominated	
2015	Last Cab to Darwin	Film Critics Circle of Australia Award	Best Director	Nominated	
2015	Last Cab to Darwin	Film Critics Circle of Australia Award	Best Script / Screenplay	Nominated	
2016	Last Cab to Darwin	Australian Directors' Guild Award	Best Direction in a Feature Film	Nominated	
2016	Last Cab to Darwin	Australian Film Critics Association Award	Best Director	Nominated	
2016	Last Cab to Darwin	Australian Film Critics Association Award	Best Screenplay	Nominated	
2016	Last Cab to Darwin	Rencontres Internationales du Cinema see Antipodes	Audience Award for Best Feature Film	Won	
2018	Wayne	Melbourne International Film Festival		Selected	

== Personal life ==
Sims was engaged to fellow Australian actor and director Kym Wilson in the early 1990s. They were set to be married in 1994, but the wedding was postponed when Wilson accepted a recurring guest role in television series The Man from Snowy River.

Sims' first daughter, China was born in 2000. He married film director Samantha Lang in 2004, with whom he had two daughters, Frederique and Evelyn. They were divorced in 2011.

Sims married academic, Dr. Tania Leimbach in Kangaroo Valley in 2015 and together they have a son, Leroy.

In June 2005, Sims was found unconscious in a Kings Cross alley in Sydney, and blamed it on exhaustion.
