= Ruben Guthrie =

- Directed by: Brendan Cowell
- Screenplay by: Brendan Cowell
- Based on: Ruben Guthrie (play) by Brendan Cowell
- Produced by: Kath Shelper
- Starring: Patrick Brammall; Alex Dimitriades; Abbey Lee
- Cinematography: Simon Harding
- Edited by: Peter Crombie
- Music by: Sarah Blasko
- Release date: 16 July 2015
- Running time: 93 minutes
- Country: Australia
- Language: English

Ruben Guthrie is a 2015 Australian romantic drama film starring Patrick Brammall as the title character, with Alex Dimitriades and Abbey Lee in supporting roles. The film was written and directed by Brendan Cowell, based on his play of the same name.

== Plot summary ==
Life is good for Ruben Guthrie (Patrick Brammall), who works as an advertisement executive and leads a lifestyle of a party boy and lives in a house on the water with his model fiancée. He's at the top of his game until Ruben lands at the bottom of his infinity pool from some drunken skylarking. Ruben's fiancée leaves him, but says she'll get back with him if he can go a year without drinking.

== Cast ==
- Patrick Brammall as Ruben Guthrie
- Abbey Lee as Zoya Houbec
- Alex Dimitriades as Damian
- Harriet Dyer as Virginia
- Yvonne Cowell as Vonny
- Jeremy Sims as Ray
- Aaron Bertram as Ken
- Michael Lahoud as Jeremy
- Brenton Thwaites as Chet
- Robyn Nevin as Susan Guthrie
- Jack Thompson as Peter Guthrie
- Blazey Best as Janelle
- Elly Oh as Sun Ye
- Natasha Beaumont as Sheridan
- Bill Thompson as Harry
- Leon Ford as Dimitri
- Francis Mossman as Lorenzo Oil

== Production ==
The screenplay, written by Brendan Cowell, is based on his play of the same name.

== Reception ==
Ruben Guthrie received mixed to positive reviews from critics, earning a 60% approval rating on Rotten Tomatoes, based on 10 reviews.

Luke Buckmaster of "Guardian" called it "an initially archetypal trajectory (boy loses girl; boy goes on mission to get her back) becomes something curlier and less conventional." CJ Johnson of ABC Radio gave a positive review, saying it "sails breezily along with terrific dialogue, great performances and an extremely relatable story. It's excellent contemporary entertainment, the kind of character and situation-based comedy the French do so well but Australian cinema, not so much."

Jim Schembri of 3AW gave a negative review, writing "It might be a case of something essential getting lost in the translation, but first-time director Brendan Cowell's adaptation of his play about an alcoholic advertising man on the road to redemption is a well-intentioned mess."

=== Accolades ===
Award	Category	Subject	Result
AACTA Awards (5th)	Best Adapted Screenplay	Brendan Cowell	Nominated
AACTA Awards (5th)	Best Actor	Patrick Brammall	Nominated
AACTA Awards (5th)	Best Supporting Actor	Alex Dimitriades	Nominated
AWGIE Award	Best Writing in a Feature Film - Adapted	Brendan Cowell	Won
FCCA Awards	Best Actor	Patrick Brammall	Nominated
FCCA Awards	Best Supporting Actor	Alex Dimitriades	Nominated
