= Aftershocks (film) =

1998 Australian TV film

- Written by: Paul Brown
- Directed by: Geoff Burton
- Starring: Jeremy Sims; Lorna Lesley; Lynette Curran; Susie Porter
- Music by: Paul Charlier
- Country of origin: Australia
- Original language: English

Production
- Producer: Julia Overton
- Running time: 90 minutes

Original release
- Release: 1998

Aftershocks is a 1998 Australian TV film based on the theatre production of the same name about the 1989 Newcastle earthquake, focussing on the Newcastle Workers Club.

== Plot ==
The story of survivors of the 1989 Newcastle earthquake that destroyed the Newcastle Workers Club.

== Cast ==
- Jeremy Sims - John Constable
- Lorna Lesley - Lyn Brown
- Lynette Curran - Fay Asquith
- Susie Porter - Marg Turnbull
- Duncan Wass - Howard Gibson
- Barbara Stephens - Elaine Gibson
- Neil Fitzpatrick - Bob Asquith
- Tina Bursill - Kerri Ingram
- Geoff Kelso - Eddie Seymour
- Ned Manning - Stan Gill
- Barbara Morton - Nina Bailey

== Production ==
Aftershocks went into production in August 1998 with filming beginning with the Newcastle Foreshore, Cooks Hill and the Newcastle Workers Club before moving to Sydney. The original play and the film adaptation takes words straight from interviews of people who were at the club at the time. Actors Lynette Curran and Jeremy Sims reprise their roles from the play.

== Reception ==
The Sydney Morning Herald's Ali Gripper wrote "Aftershocks has the advantage of being based on fact. The characters speak so eloquently for themselves that there is no real need to introduce a narrative, or dialogue, or even music."

== Awards ==
- 1999 AFI Awards
  - Best Performance by an Actor in a Telefeature or Mini Series - Jeremy Sims - won
  - Best Mini-Series or Telefeature - Julia Overton - nominated
