= Rams (2015 film) =

2015 film

- International release poster
- Icelandic: Hrútar
- Directed by: Grímur Hákonarson
- Written by: Grímur Hákonarson
- Produced by: Grímar Jónsson
- Starring: Sigurður Sigurjónsson; Theódór Júlíusson; Charlotte Bøving; Gunnar Jónsson; Sveinn Ólafur Gunnarsson; Þorleifur Einarsson; Jon Benonysson
- Cinematography: Sturla Brandth Grøvlen
- Edited by: Kristján Loðmfjörð
- Music by: Atli Örvarsson
- Production companies: Aeroplan Films; Film Farms; Netop Films; Profile Pictures
- Release dates: 15 May 2015 (Cannes); 28 May 2015 (Iceland)
- Running time: 92 minutes
- Countries: Iceland; Denmark; Norway; Poland
- Language: Icelandic
- Budget: €1.75 million
- Box office: $1.90 million

Rams (Icelandic: Hrútar) is a 2015 Icelandic drama film written and directed by Grímur Hákonarson. It follows two sheep farmers and estranged brothers, Kiddi (Theódór Júlíusson) and Gummi (Sigurður Sigurjónsson), in rural Iceland, who must deal with a scrapie outbreak in their flock.

The film had its world premiere in the Un Certain Regard section of the 2015 Cannes Film Festival on 15 May 2015, where it won the Prix Un Certain Regard. It was selected as the Icelandic entry for the Best Foreign Language Film at the 88th Academy Awards, but it was not nominated.

== Plot ==
Two sheep farming brothers have not spoken to each other for forty years due to differences in their personalities, complicated by one brother, Kiddi's, poor temper and alcoholism (it is implied his problems caused him to be disinherited, another source of strife between them), and the other brother, Gummi's, resentment and jealousy over Kiddi's prize-winning ram. They live in adjacent houses on the family farm, legally owned by the sober brother. Both are unmarried and attached to their flocks. A prize-winning ram belonging to Kiddi is found to have scrapie after Gummi reports its symptoms, which is then found in two other farms, necessitating the slaughter of all the sheep in the valley. The farmers must burn their hay and disinfect the barns.

Gummi kills his flock before the bio-hazards team arrive, but hides a few ewes and a ram in his basement, as they are the last of their breed. His brother resents Gummi for reporting the disease and the subsequent cull, inflaming tensions between them. Kiddi refuses to kill his sheep and, after authorities intervene and cull them, he becomes drunk and abusive more often. He also refuses to clean his barn; so as the legal owner, Gummi must step in and clean it—which he does while Kiddi is in hospital. Upon his return, sobered-up Kiddi accidentally discovers Gummi's hidden sheep and wants to help save them, but Gummi refuses all association. When a member of the cleanup team also discovers the sheep, the two brothers are forced to collaborate and attempt to drive them into the highlands in a blizzard. Their quad bike bogs down in a snowdrift, and the brothers become separated. The sheep wander off, and Kiddi finds Gummi in a snowdrift, near death from hypothermia. He attempts to save his brother by building a makeshift snow shelter, but Gummi does not revive. The film ends with Kiddi attempting to warm Gummi in the womb-like shelter, acknowledging their reconciliation.

== Cast ==
- Sigurður Sigurjónsson as Gummi
- Theódór Júlíusson as Kiddi
- Charlotte Bøving as Katrin
- Jon Benonysson as Runólfur
- Gunnar Jónsson as Grímur
- Þorleifur Einarsson as Sindri
- Sveinn Ólafur Gunnarsson as Bjarni

== Production ==
Rams was based on a story told by the director's father about two brothers sharing the same land who had a falling out over a woman and stopped speaking to each other for 40 years. Grímur liked the tragicomic underpinnings of the story, noting that such conflicts can be common in rural Iceland and beyond. "These brothers are not only in sheep farming, they are also in the parliament."

The film was shot on locations in the Bárðardalur valley in north east Iceland between Akureyri and Mývatn.

Sigurður Sigurjónsson and Theodór Júlíusson, two of Iceland's best-known actors, prepared for their roles by working on a sheep farm. Most of the other characters were actual farmers, as was the film's sheep trainer.

== Reception ==
Rams received critical acclaim. On Rotten Tomatoes, the film has an approval rating of 95% based on 108 reviews, with an average rating of 7.7/10. The critical consensus states: "Rams transcends its remote location—and somewhat esoteric storyline—by using the easily relatable dynamic between two stubborn brothers to speak universal truths." On Metacritic, the film has a weighted average score of 82 out of 100, based on 24 critics, indicating "universal acclaim".

In 2016, online newspaper Kjarninn voted it the second-greatest Icelandic film of all time.

== Release ==
Rams won the prize for Un Certain Regard for 2015, the top prize conferred by a jury presided over by Isabella Rossellini. It was screened in the Contemporary World Cinema section of the 2015 Toronto International Film Festival.

At the 2015 Transilvania International Film Festival, Rams won the Special Jury Award (i.e. third place) and also won the Audience Award (most votes for a film in competition). It won the Audience award at the Tromsø International Film Festival and Iranian Fajr Film Festival in 2016.

== Remake ==
An Australian remake, directed by Jeremy Sims and starring Sam Neill and Michael Caton, was released in Australian cinemas on 29 October 2020.

== See also ==
- List of submissions to the 88th Academy Awards for Best Foreign Language Film
- List of Icelandic submissions for the Academy Award for Best International Feature Film
