= Kópavogur =

- Municipality
- Kópavogsbær
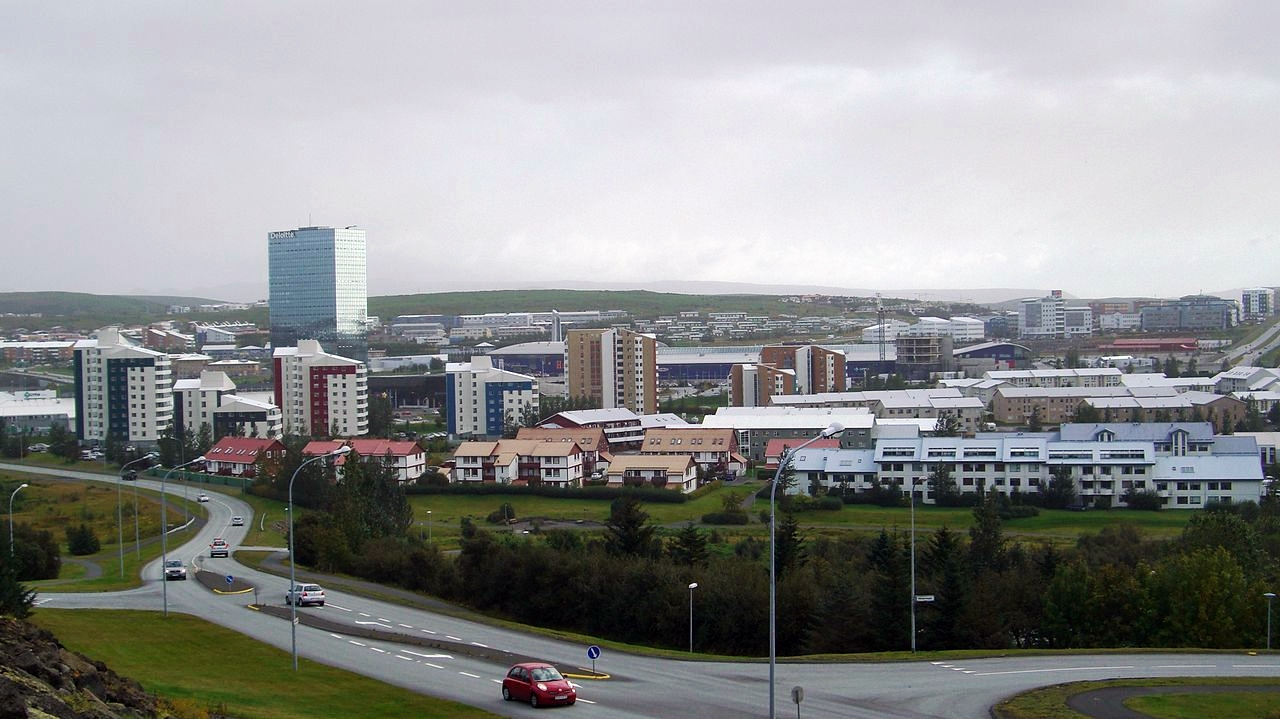
- View of Smárahverfi, Kópavogur, in 2010

- Location of Kópavogsbær within Iceland
- Coordinates: 64°06′39″N 21°54′34″W
- Country: Iceland
- Region: Capital Region
- Constituency: Southwest Constituency
- Municipality established: 1948
- Town status: 11 May 1955

Government
  - Mayor: Ásdís Kristjánsdóttir (IP)

Area
  - Total: 110 km^{2} (42 sq mi)

Population (1 January 2026)
  - Total: 40,286
  - Density: 370/km^{2} (950/sq mi)
- Demonym(s): Kópavogsbúi, Kópavogsbúar (Icelandic)
- Postal code(s): 200–203
- Municipal number: 1000
- Website: kopavogur.is (in Icelandic)

Kópavogur (Icelandic pronunciation: [ˈkʰouːpaˌvɔːɣʏr̥]) is a town in Iceland that is the country's second-largest municipality by population.

It lies immediately south of Reykjavík and is part of the Capital Region. The name literally means seal pup inlet. The town seal contains the profile of the church Kópavogskirkja with a seal pup underneath.

Kópavogur is largely made up of residential areas, but has commercial areas and much industrial activity as well. The tallest building in Iceland, the Smáratorg Tower, is located in central Kópavogur.

Kópavogur

== History ==
Kópavogur is historically significant as the site of the 1662 Kópavogur meeting. This event marked the total incorporation of Iceland into Denmark–Norway when, on behalf of the Icelandic people, Bishop Brynjólfur Sveinsson and Árni Oddsson, a lawyer, signed a document confirming that the introduction of absolute monarchy by Frederick III of Denmark–Norway also applied to Iceland.

Kópavogur is also one of Iceland's most prominent sites for Icelandic urban legends about the huldufólk; it also features in this capacity in the 2010 film Sumarlandið, where the stone Grásteinn is portrayed as an elf-house in the Kópavogur municipality.

An independent township, Kópavogur is adjacent to Reykjavík.

== Sports ==
Kópavogur's main sports clubs are Gerpla, Breiðablik and HK. In 2010, Breiðablik clinched their first Icelandic league title in football into; furthermore, in 2012, HK won their first Icelandic league title in team handball.

The town is also home to the hardcore training facility 'Thor's Power Gym', owned by strongman legend Hafþór Júlíus Björnsson. It was the venue of 501 kg (1,105 lb) all-time world record deadlift in 2020.

== Notable people ==
- Emilíana Torrini (born 1977), singer
- Eiður Guðjohnsen (born 1978), footballer
- Hafþór Júlíus Björnsson (born 1988), strongman
- Sverrir Ingi Ingason (born 1993), footballer
- Diljá (born 2001), singer
- Hálfdán Helgi Matthíasson (born 2003), singer
- Matthías Davíð Matthíasson (born 2004), singer

== Twin towns – sister cities ==
Kópavogur is twinned with:

- Ammassalik, Greenland
- Klaksvík, Faroe Islands
- Mariehamn, Åland Islands, Finland
- Norrköping, Sweden
- Odense, Denmark
- Tampere, Finland
- Trondheim, Norway
- Wuhan, China

== Gallery ==
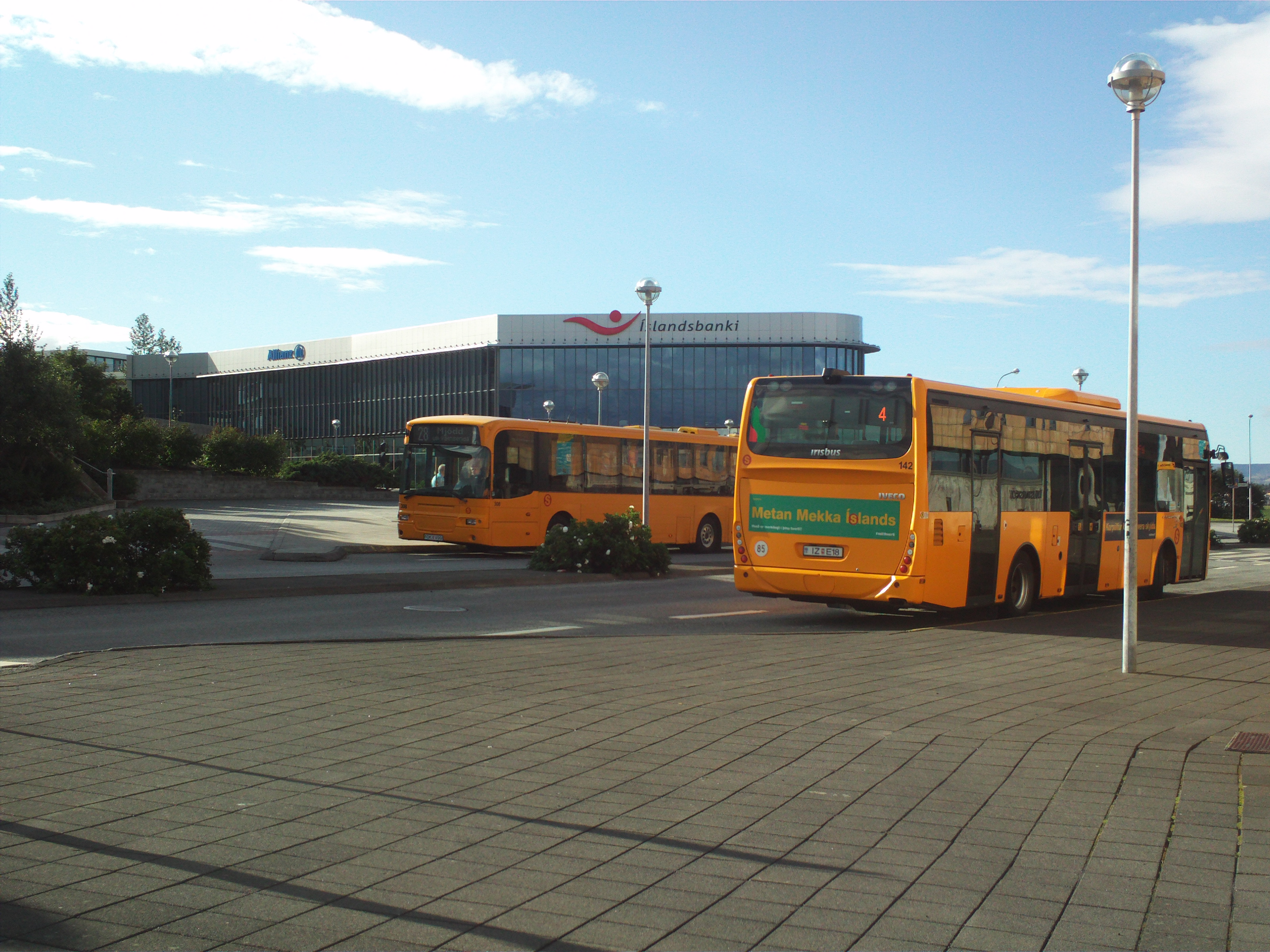
Public buses of Strætó in Kópavogur

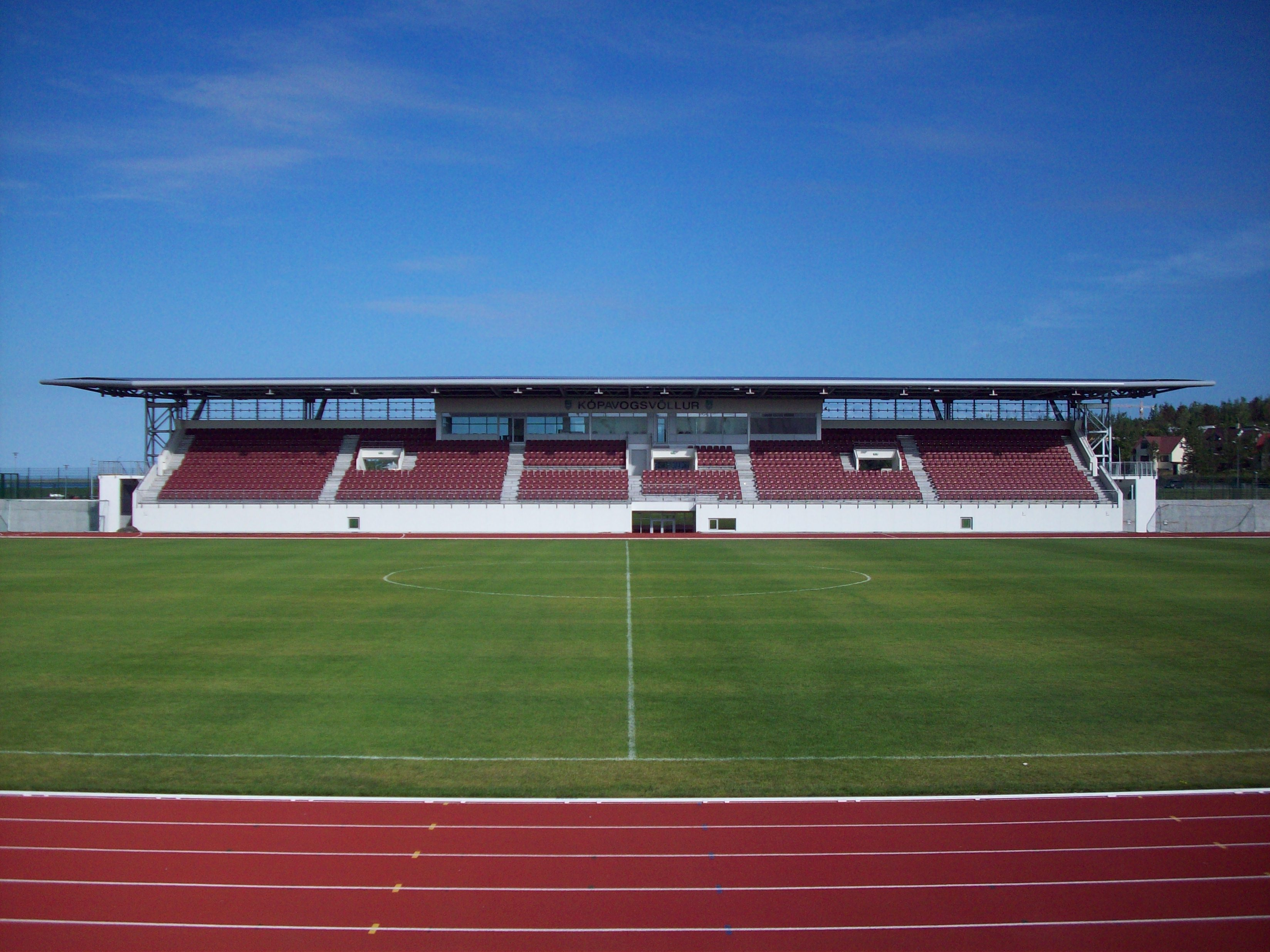
Kópavogsvöllur stadium

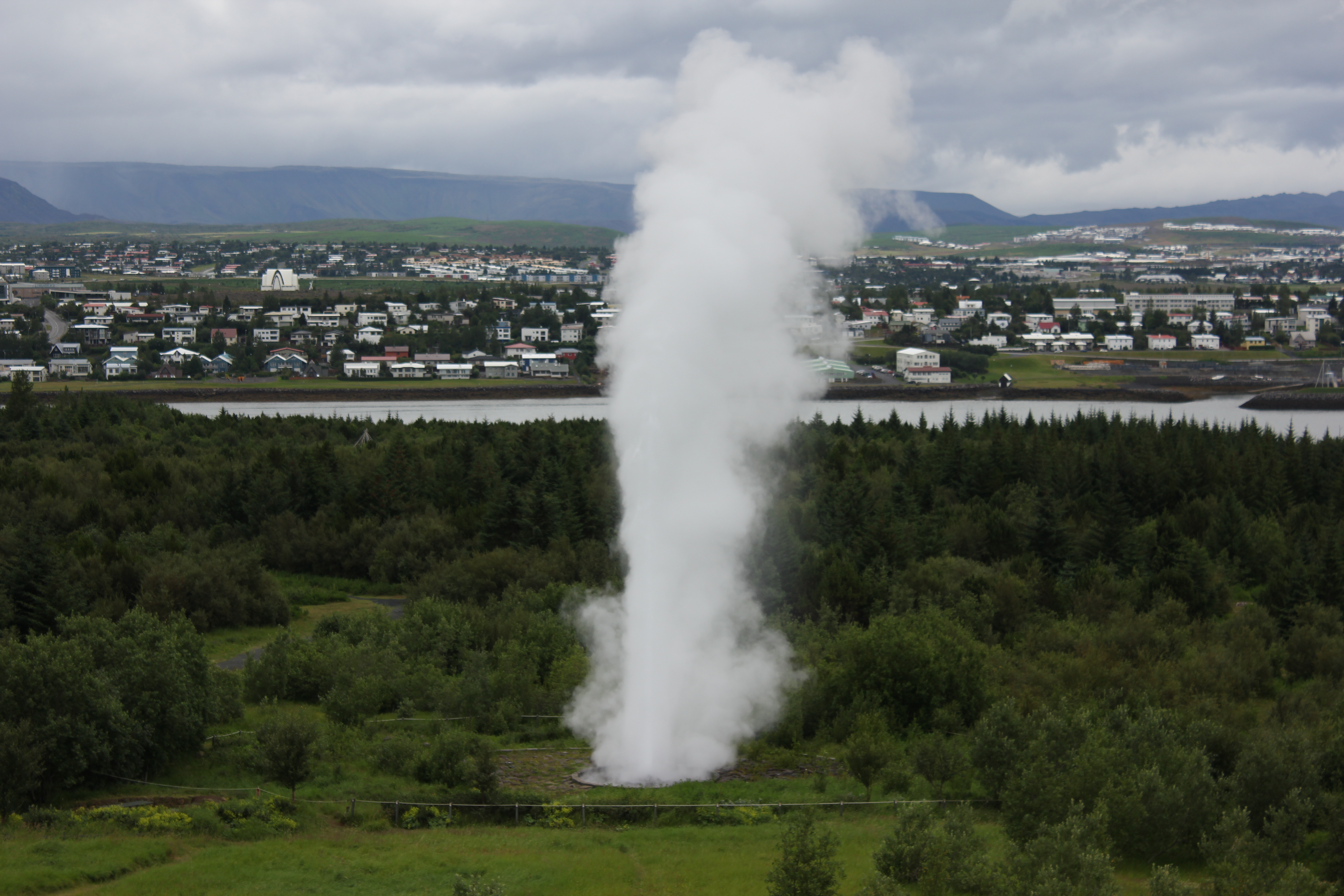
Artificial geyser, Kópavogur in the background

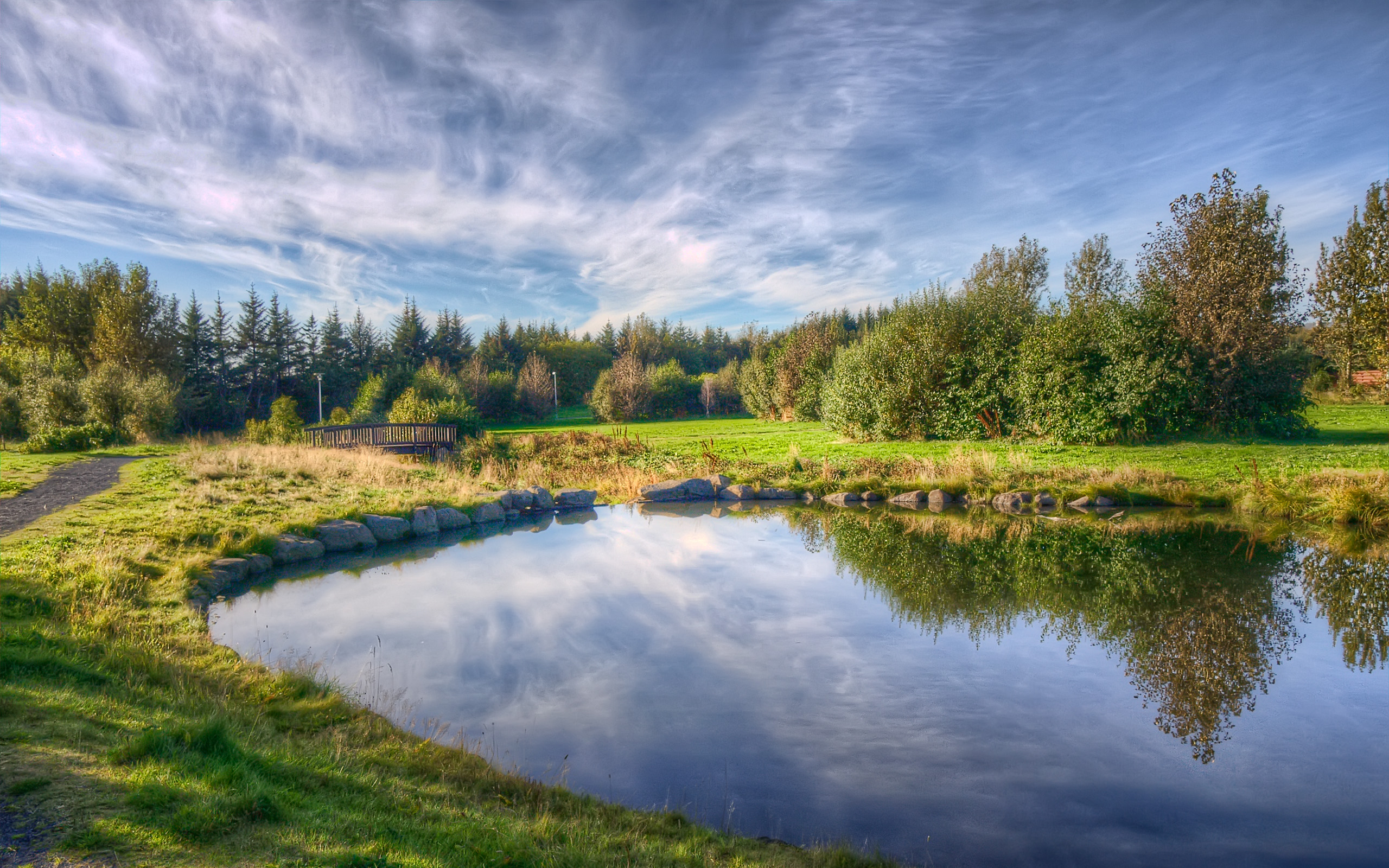
Pond in the park

Kópavogur church

Smáratorg Tower, the tallest building in Iceland

== Transport ==
Kópavogur is connected to the bus network of Strætó. Also the Borgarlína network, a BRT-system connecting Reykjavik and surrounding area, is under construction.

== See also ==
- List of cities and towns in Iceland
