= Kangaroo Palace =

- Written by: Deborah Cox; Andrew Knight
- Directed by: Robert Marchand
- Starring: Jacqueline McKenzie; John Polson; Rebecca Gibney; Jeremy Sims; Jonathan Firth; Jerome Ehlers
- Music by: Tim Finn
- Country of origin: Australia
- Original language: English

Production
- Producer: Ewan Burnett
- Cinematography: Kim Batterham
- Editor: Anne Carter

Original release
- Network: Seven Network
- Release: 25 May 1997

Kangaroo Palace is an Australian television drama miniseries which aired in 1997 on the Seven Network.

== Plot summary ==
In 1966, Catherine Macaleese (Jacqueline McKenzie) is counting the days until she meets her father, a distant childhood memory, and starts a new life with him in England. Heather Randall (Rebecca Gibney) is Catherine's cousin and closest friend who puts her marriage plans on hold to travel on the Oriana. Richard Turner (John Polson), an aspiring journalist, decides to try his luck on Fleet Street, and promises his fiancée, Sandy, that he will return in a few months. Jack Gill (Jeremy Sims), heading along a path of self-destruction, embarks on the journey at the last minute. On board, Jack disappears with the group's money and the trio arrive penniless. The only contact they have is a friend of Jack's, the mysterious Terence Foster-Burrows (Jonathan Firth). He shows little surprise for their predicament and offers them rooms in the Palace.

== Cast ==
- Jacqueline McKenzie as Catherine Macaleese
- John Polson as Richard Turner
- Rebecca Gibney as Heather Randall
- Jeremy Sims as Jack Gill
- Jonathan Firth as Terence Foster-Burrows
- Jerome Ehlers as Simon Seymour
- Josephine Byrnes as Ann
- Alison Whyte as Barbara
- Kym Gyngell as Spider
- Susanne Chapman as Sandy
- Susie Edmonds as Lillian
- Jim Daly as Ted Rowlands
- Alexandra Sangster as Lucy
- Jan Frazer as Mrs. Turner
- Dennis Miller as Mr. Turner
- Bridie Carter as Dianne
- Jane Hall as Sue
- Bob Franklin
- Tim Robertson as Charles Reid
- Tom E. Lewis as Koori
- Jane Allsop as Cecily

== See also ==
- Cinema of Australia
