= Sanctuary (1995 film) =

- Directed by: Robin De Crespigny
- Written by: David Williamson
- Based on: the play by David Williamson
- Produced by: Andrew Steuart; Oscar Scherl
- Starring: Steve Bisley; Arky Michael
- Cinematography: Ray Henman
- Edited by: Neil Thumpston
- Music by: Christopher Gordon
- Production companies: Spandau Films Pty Ltd; Australian Film Commission
- Release date: 1995
- Running time: 97 minutes
- Country: Australia
- Language: English
- Budget: $250,000

Sanctuary is a 1995 Australian film written by David Williamson and directed by Robin De Crespigny. It is adapted from Williamson's play and had a reported budget of $250,000.

== Plot ==
A retired, wealthy, former journalist, Bob King, is interviewed by a student, John, who is doing a PhD thesis on King's career. The discussion erupts into violence.

== Cast ==
- Steve Bisley as Robert (Bob) King
- Arky Michael as John Alderston

== Reception ==
Writing in Variety David Stratton said it was "a claustrophobic two-hander distinguished by a couple of fine performances", adding that "the piece still has an overwritten feel and could have been pruned somewhat to good effect."

The Sydney Morning Herald's Clare Morgan stated that "there are moments when it's screamingly obvious it has come from the stage. Some passages sound too much like homilies, the main target being American imperialism. But the strength of the two actors helps overcome early awkward moments, as does some eerie camera work."

Commenting on the upcoming AFI Awards Jim Schembri of The Age wrote that it "easily qualifies as one of the worst films yet made in Australia."

Susan Wilson recalled the screening at the 1995 Sydney Film Festival commenting that "We were practically begging the audience to stay but it felt like we were getting down to about 100 people in a cinema that seats 2000."

== Awards ==
- 1995 AFI Awards
  - Best Adapted Screenplay - David Williamson - nominated
  - Best Original Music Score - Christopher Gordon - nominated
