= Arky Michael =

Australian actor and writer

- Education: National Institute of Dramatic Art
- Occupations: Actor, writer
- Years active: 1983 – present
- Known for: Rafferty's Rules as Fulvio Frangellomini

Arky Michael is an Australian actor and writer, who is best known for his role as Fulvio Frangellomini in the television drama series Rafferty's Rules.

== Early life ==
Michael studied acting at National Institute of Dramatic Art (NIDA) and graduated with a Bachelor of Dramatic Art (Acting) in 1982.

== Career ==
Michael's first starring role was as George Poulopoulos in the television series Sweet and Sour (1984). A recurring role on drama series A Country Practice followed (1986–1987), before he took on his best known role as Fulvio Frangellomini in Rafferty's Rules (1987–1991). He then featured in the Australian children's series Johnson and Friends, as the costume actor for the titular character in the second series.

Michael also had numerous guest roles on television series through this career, such as Mother and Son, E Street, Wildside, Water Rats, Grass Roots and All Saints.

Michael is part of a screenwriting team together with Kym Vercoe, with whom he wrote the feature film, Mrs Burswood, recipient of the 2017 Monte Miller Award for Best Unproduced Screenplay. They have collaborated on independent theatre projects for Theatre Kantanka and version 1. Michael has also written a number of short films, including Australian Summer, which won Best Film at Tropfest in 2005.

Michael has also worked extensively in theatre for many of the major Australian companies including Belvoir, Sydney Theatre Company, Melbourne Theatre Company, Queensland Theatre and Bell Shakespeare.

== Filmography ==
=== Film ===
Year	Title	Role	Type
1984	2084 (aka Starship or Lorca and the Outlaws)	Dylan	Feature film
1985	After Hours	Lorraine's Boyfriend	Short film
1989	Candy Regentag	Franky	Feature film
1990	The Ham Funeral	Fourth Relative	TV movie
1997	Sanctuary	John Alderston	Feature film
2001	Jet Set	Sanitation Engineer	Feature film
2004	The Mime Artist	Bill	Short film
2005	Australian Summer	Joe	Short film
2011	Animal Love	Garry	Short film
2012	Last Christmas	Man	Short film
2013	For Those Who Can Tell No Tales	Arky	Short film

=== Television ===
Year	Title	Role	Type
1984	City West	Alec Pontes	1 episode
1984	Sweet and Sour	George Poulopoulos	20 episodes
1986	Mother and Son	Constable	1 episode
1986	Call Me Mister	Barman	1 episode
1986–1987	A Country Practice	Kenny Mitchell	10 episodes
1987–1991	Rafferty's Rules	Fulvio Frangellomini	86 episodes
1990	Col’n Carpenter	Mr Cole	1 episode
1990–1991	Johnson and Friends	Johnson	Season 2, 15 episodes
1992	E Street	Albie Johnson	4 episodes
1993	Hey Dad..!	Neville Short	1 episode
1993–1995	G.P.	Doug Hardin / Arnie	2 episodes
1994	The Fox Cubhouse	Johnson	Segment: "Johnson and Friends"
1995	Johnson and Friends: Songs from the Toybox	Johnson	Video
1997	Water Rats	Dave Fremont	1 episode
1999	Wildside	Gordy Gilmour	1 episode
2000	Grass Roots	Des	1 episode
2008	All Saints	Doug Silverman	1 episode
2008	My Place	Mr Josephides	1 episode
2016	Janet King	George Healy	2 episodes
2017	House of Bond	Paint Boss	Miniseries, 2 episodes
2022	It's Fine, I'm Fine	Aziz	
2023	NCIS: Sydney	Russian Orthodox Priest	1 episode

=== Video game ===
Year	Title	Role	Type
1999	M.U.G.E.N		Video game

== Theatre ==
=== As actor ===
Year	Title	Role	Venue / Co.
1981	All's Well That Ends Well		Jane St Theatre, Sydney
1982	Nervous System		NIDA Parade Theatre, Sydney
1982	Camino Real	The Bum	NIDA Parade Theatre, Sydney
1982	The Crucible	Ezekiel Cheever	NIDA Parade Theatre, Sydney, Playhouse, Canberra, University of Newcastle
1982	Bitter Sweet	Mr Proutie / Herr Schtick	NIDA Parade Theatre, Sydney
1984	Il Magnifico	Michaelangelo	Seymour Centre, Sydney
1985	A Midsummer Night’s Dream		Seymour Centre, Sydney with Nimrod
1987	The Heartbreak Kid	Con / Nicky's Father / Deputy Headmaster	Stables Theatre, Sydney with Griffin Theatre Company
1988	Interplay '88		Sydney Opera House
1989	The Ham Funeral		Wharf Theatre, Sydney with STC
1990	The Venetian Twins	Brighella	Suncorp Theatre, Brisbane with QTC
1990	The Tempest		Belvoir, Sydney
1991	Writers		Riverina Playhouse, Wagga Wagga
1991	The Boys Next Door		Ensemble Theatre, Sydney
1992	The Shrinking Ledge		SWY Theatre, Perth
1992–1994	Two Weeks With the Queen	Luke / Alistair / Student Doctor / others	Australian national tour
1993	A Midsummer Night’s Dream		Royal Botanic Gardens Melbourne, Royal Botanic Garden, Sydney
1995	Sydney Stories 2: The Blessing / Two Wongs / In the Club / The Way I Was		Wharf Theatre with STC for Sydney Festival
1995	Pierrot and Columbine		Wharf Theatre, Sydney with Kim Carpenter's Theatre of Image & STC
1996	As You Like It	Silvius	Sydney Opera House with STC
1996	Playgrounds		Wharf Theatre, Sydney with STC
1996	The Alchemist		Belvoir, Sydney
1996	Coralie Lansdowne Says No		Stables Theatre, Sydney with Griffin Theatre Company
1997	The Comedy of Errors	Dromio of Ephesus	Sydney Opera House with STC for Sydney Festival
1997	Don's Party		Playhouse Adelaide with STCSA
1997	The Promised Land: Tinsel and Ashes / Feast		Bondi Pavilion, Sydney
1999	The Taming of the Shrew		Royal Botanic Garden, Sydney with Australian Shakespeare Company
1999	The Merchant of Venice	Salerio	Australian national tour with Bell Shakespeare
2000	The Small Poppies	Menacing Bully / Greek Immigrant Dad	Belvoir, Sydney, Playhouse, Melbourne, The Butter Factory Theatre, Wodonga, Sydney Opera House
2000; 2001	Much Ado About Nothing		The Capital, Bendigo, IMB Theatre, Wollongong with Bell Shakespeare & Merrigong Theatre Company
2001	Ubu	Qasim	Belvoir, Sydney
2002	A Man With Five Children		Wharf Theatre with STC
2002	Macbeth		Wharf Theatre with STC
2002	The Boys Next Door		Ensemble Theatre, Sydney
2002; 2003	The Book Keeper of Rua Dos Douradores	Soares	Sidetrack Theatre, Sydney, Seymour Centre, Sydney
2003	The Underpants	Theo	NSW & VIC tour
2003–2005	The Servant of Two Masters	Brighella	Australian national tour with Bell Shakespeare
2005	Kiss of the Alien		Newtown Theatre, Sydney for Short+Sweet
2005	The Two Gentlemen of Verona	Antonio	Australian national tour with Bell Shakespeare
2006	Romeo and Juliet	Peter	Playhouse, Canberra, Playhouse, Melbourne, Sydney Opera House, Frankston Arts Centre, Clocktower Centre, Melbourne with Bell Shakespeare
2007	Pearlie in the Park		Her Majesty’s Theatre, Ballarat, Darebin Arts and Entertainment Centre with Monkey Baa Productions
2009	Baghdad Wedding	Kathum	Belvoir, Sydney
2009–2010	This Kind of Ruckus		Carriageworks, Sydney, Norwood Concert Hall, Adelaide, Lismore City Hall, Fairfax Studio, Melbourne with Version 1.0, Performance Space & Full Tilt
2009–2011	Missing the Bus to David Jones	Old Man	Campbelltown Arts Centre, Carriageworks, Sydney, Seymour Centre, Sydney with Kantanka Theatre Company
2010	Love Me Tender	Chorus	Perth Cultural Centre, Belvoir, Sydney with Griffin Theatre Company
2010	Measure for Measure	Pompey	Belvoir, Sydney
2011	Much Ado About Nothing	Antonio	Sydney Opera House, Playhouse, Canberra, Playhouse, Melbourne with Bell Shakespeare
2011; 2013	The Table of Knowledge	Frank Vellar	Bruce Gordon Theatre, Wollongong, Hopgood Theatre, Adelaide, Lennox Theatre, Parramatta, The Butter Factory Theatre, Wodonga with Merrigong Theatre Company & Version 1.0
2013	Henry IV	Silence / various roles	Playhouse, Canberra, Playhouse, Melbourne, Heath Ledger Theatre, Perth, Sydney Opera House with Bell Shakespeare
2013	Penelope	Dunne	Tap Gallery Theatre, Sydney with Siren Theatre Company
2013	Counting and Cracking	Ismet	Ridley Centre, Adelaide Showgrounds with Belvoir, Sydney for Adelaide Festival
2014	Clubsingularity	Chairman	National Art School, Sydney with Performance Space
2015	Mother Courage and Her Children		Belvoir, Sydney
2015	The Tempest	Sebastian / Trinculo	Sydney Opera House with Bell Shakespeare
2015	ReLoad		107 Projects, Sydney with Theatre Kantanka & Intimate Spectacle
2018	Sami in Paradise	Father Arky	Belvoir, Sydney
2018	Permission to Spin	Martin	Old Fitzroy Theatre, Sydney
2018	The Humans	Erik	Old Fitzroy Theatre, Sydney
2018	Obscene Madame D	Ehud	Theatre Kantanka
2022	Gods and Little Fishes	Guy the Strongman	New Theatre, Sydney
2023	Amadeus	Guiseppe Bonno	Sydney Opera House

=== As crew ===
Year	Title	Role	Venue / Co.
2006	The Example	Director	Seymour Centre, Sydney for Short+Sweet
2009–2010	This Kind of Ruckus	Devisor	Carriageworks, Sydney, Norwood Concert Hall, Adelaide, Lismore City Hall, Fairfax Studio, Melbourne with Version 1.0, Performance Space & Full Tilt
2011; 2013	The Table of Knowledge	Devisor	Bruce Gordon Theatre, Wollongong, Hopgood Theatre, Adelaide, Lennox Theatre, Parramatta, Butter Factory Theatre, Wodonga with Merrigong Theatre Company & Version 1.0
2015	Cowboy Mouth	Director	Hibernian House, Sydney
2018	Sami in Paradise	Adaptor	Belvoir, Sydney

== Awards ==
Year	Work	Award	Category	Result	Ref
2005	Australian Summer	Tropfest	Best Actor Award	Won	
2010	Love Me Tender (Belvoir)	Helpmann Award	Best Male Actor in a Supporting Role in a Play	Nominated	
2017	Mrs Burswood	Monte Miller Award	Best Unproduced Screenplay	Won	
2021	Songbird	SBS Emerging Writers' Competition		Runner Up	
