= Last Cab to Darwin (film) =

- Australian theatrical release poster
- Directed by: Jeremy Sims
- Written by: Reg Cribb; Jeremy Sims
- Based on: Last Cab to Darwin by Reg Cribb
- Produced by: Lisa Duff; Greg Duffy; Jeremy Sims
- Starring: Michael Caton; Ningali Lawford; Mark Coles Smith; Emma Hamilton; Jacki Weaver
- Cinematography: Steve Arnold
- Edited by: Marcus D'Arcy
- Music by: Ed Kuepper
- Distributed by: Icon Film Distribution; Films Distribution
- Release date: 6 June 2015 (Sydney Film Festival)
- Running time: 123 minutes
- Country: Australia
- Language: English
- Budget: A$3.993 million
- Box office: A$8 million

Last Cab to Darwin is a 2015 Australian film directed by Jeremy Sims and written by Sims and Reg Cribb. Based on Cribb's 2003 play of the same name, it stars Michael Caton, Ningali Lawford, Mark Coles Smith, Emma Hamilton and Jacki Weaver, who was in the original cast of the play. Like the play, the film was inspired by the true story of Max Bell, a taxi driver who traveled from Broken Hill to Darwin to seek euthanasia after he was diagnosed with a terminal illness. The film received positive reviews and was nominated for nine AACTA Awards, winning Best Actor for Caton and Best Adapted Screenplay for Sims and Cribb.

== Plot ==
Rex, a taxi driver in his 70s, has spent nearly his entire life in the New South Wales city of Broken Hill. He has a group of friends, but never had a family of his own and has no family members remaining. He has a close relationship with his Aboriginal neighbour Polly, but because of racial tensions, is resistant to becoming romantically involved. Rex's life changes when he is diagnosed with cancer and told he will not survive longer than three months. Refusing to become committed to a hospital, he learns that a euthanasia device has been invented by Dr. Nicole Farmer at a clinic in the Northern Territory capital city of Darwin. Rex contacts Dr. Farmer and volunteers to serve as the device's first patient. Due to euthanasia only being legal in the Northern Territory, Rex embarks on a 3,000-kilometre journey, in his Ford BA Falcon taxi, to Darwin to end his life on his own terms. He leaves behind a will, which grants ownership of his home to Polly.

On the way to Darwin, Rex is joined by Tilly, an Aboriginal drifter. Tilly reveals to Rex that he turned down an offer to join a football club and eventually admits he did so out of fear. The men are later accompanied by Julie, an English backpacker and nurse. When they reach their destination, the group learns from Dr. Farmer that euthanasia cannot legally proceed without approval from a psychological and medical expert. As he waits to be interviewed by the experts, Rex has Tilly join the football club he originally turned down. He also contacts Polly, despite her anger at him for trying to end his life, and admits that he wanted to ask for her hand in marriage. She calls him back and says she would have accepted.

Rex's interview with a medical expert becomes delayed and he winds up becoming hospitalised, which he was attempting to avoid. Unable to wait any longer, Rex has Julie hook him up to the device and answers the questions required to initiate the euthanasia procedure, but as the drugs start to head towards his bloodstream, he disconnects himself. Deciding he does not want to end his life, Rex drives back to Broken Hill, assisted by medication Julie provided. While Rex heads home with minimal rest, Tilly prepares to play in his first football game and Julie returns to England.

Arriving at his house, an exhausted Rex is greeted by Polly on his front porch. The two hold hands as Rex loses consciousness and watches the sun set.

== Cast ==
- Michael Caton as Rex
- Ningali Lawford as Polly
- Mark Coles Smith as Tilly
- Emma Hamilton as Julie
- Jacki Weaver as Dr. Nicole Farmer
- Shareena Clanton as Sally
- Brian Taylor as Tilly's football coach
- Mercia Deane-Johns as Fay
- Brendan Cowell as tavern publican

== Production ==
The script for the film was adapted as a screenplay by Jeremy Sims and Reg Cribb. Sims' association with Reg Cribb began when his production company, Pork Chop Productions produced a successful stage version. The film was given the go-ahead by Screen Australia in October 2013 as one of six films to share in $5.4 million government funding.

The shooting was scheduled to take place between May and June 2014.

== Historical background ==
The play and film are modeled on the true story of Max Bell, a taxi driver from Broken Hill who made the 3,000-kilometre trip from Broken Hill to Darwin in 1996 seeking euthanasia. Like Rex in the film, Bell also drove back to Broken Hill, but Bell did so reluctantly. He had been unable to obtain the signatures required to proceed with euthanasia in Darwin and died slowly in a hospital in Broken Hill, the fate he was trying to avoid.

The euthanasia device invented by the fictional Nicole Farmer in the film is based on Australian physician Philip Nitschke's Deliverance Machine, which was used legally in the Northern Territory while the Rights of the Terminally Ill Act was in effect.

== Reception ==
Last Cab to Darwin received positive reviews from critics, earning an 89% approval rating on Rotten Tomatoes based on 35 reviews with an average rating of 7.1 out of 10, indicating critical acclaim. On Metacritic, the film holds a score of 70 based on nine reviews, indicating "generally favorable reviews".

Brad Wheeler of The Globe and Mail wrote a positive review of the film, he stated "Last Cab to Darwin is a scenic drama evocatively shot, with shafts of sunlight here and gritty blue-collar rurality there." In the Los Angeles Times, Gary Goldstein also praised the film "Still, there’s much to admire about this alternately tough and tender film, including a fine turn by Caton, some striking outback scenery, and many resonant thoughts about living... and dying."

In Variety, Eddie Cockrell praised the characterisations and writing, stating, "There is a certain kind of film, rare in the best of times, that exudes a distinct creative concentration, a precisely measured marinade of character and story that suggests an extended gestation period of forethought and planning." Critic Harry Windsor from The Hollywood Reporter wrote a glowing review, saying it's "because it consists of one ravishing shot of the blood-orange outback after another, and Sims wrings gentle pleasures from this most unlikely of subjects."

=== Accolades ===
Award	Category	Subject	Result
AACTA Awards (5th)	Best Film	Lisa Duff	Nominated
AACTA Awards (5th)	Best Film	Greg Duffy	Nominated
AACTA Awards (5th)	Best Film	Jeremy Sims	Nominated
AACTA Awards (5th)	Best Direction	Jeremy Sims	Nominated
AACTA Awards (5th)	Best Adapted Screenplay	Jeremy Sims	Won
AACTA Awards (5th)	Best Adapted Screenplay	Reg Cribb	Won
AACTA Awards (5th)	Best Actor	Michael Caton	Won
AACTA Awards (5th)	Best Actress	Ningali Lawford	Nominated
AACTA Awards (5th)	Best Supporting Actor	Mark Coles Smith	Nominated
AACTA Awards (5th)	Best Supporting Actress	Emma Hamilton	Nominated
AACTA Awards (5th)	Best Cinematography	Steve Arnold	Nominated
AACTA Awards (5th)	People's Choice Award for Favourite Australian Film	Lisa Duff	Nominated
AACTA Awards (5th)	People's Choice Award for Favourite Australian Film	Greg Duffy	Nominated
AACTA Awards (5th)	People's Choice Award for Favourite Australian Film	Jeremy Sims	Nominated
ARIA Awards	Best Original Soundtrack, Cast or Show Album	soundtrack	Nominated
ADG Award	Best Direction in a Feature Film	Jeremy Sims	Nominated
AFCA Awards	Best Film	Lisa Duff	Nominated
AFCA Awards	Best Film	Greg Duffy	Nominated
AFCA Awards	Best Film	Jeremy Sims	Nominated
AFCA Awards	Best Director	Jeremy Sims	Nominated
AFCA Awards	Best Screenplay	Jeremy Sims	Nominated
AFCA Awards	Best Screenplay	Reg Cribb	Nominated
AFCA Awards	Best Actor	Michael Caton	Nominated
AFCA Awards	Best Supporting Actor	Mark Coles Smith	Nominated
AFCA Awards	Best Supporting Actress	Emma Hamilton	Nominated
AWGIE Award	Best Writing in a Feature Film – Adapted	Jeremy Sims	Nominated
AWGIE Award	Best Writing in a Feature Film – Adapted	Reg Cribb	Nominated
CGA Award	Best Film Casting	Kirsty McGregor	Won
FCCA Awards	Best Film	Lisa Duff	Nominated
FCCA Awards	Best Film	Greg Duffy	Nominated
FCCA Awards	Best Film	Jeremy Sims	Nominated
FCCA Awards	Best Director	Jeremy Sims	Nominated
FCCA Awards	Best Script/Screenplay	Jeremy Sims	Nominated
FCCA Awards	Best Script/Screenplay	Reg Cribb	Nominated
FCCA Awards	Best Actor	Michael Caton	Won
FCCA Awards	Best Supporting Actor	Mark Coles Smith	Won
FCCA Awards	Best Supporting Actress	Emma Hamilton	Nominated
FCCA Awards	Best Supporting Actress	Ningali Lawford	Nominated
FCCA Awards	Best Cinematography	Steve Arnold	Nominated
Sydney Film Festival	Audience Award for Best Narrative Feature	Jeremy Sims	Runner-up
