= Summerland (2010 film) =

2010 Icelandic film by Grímur Hákonarson

- Directed by: Grímur Hákonarson
- Produced by: Baltasar Kormákur
- Starring: Kjartan Guðjónsson; Ólafía Hrönn Jónsdóttir
- Distributed by: Blueeyes Productions
- Release date: September 17, 2010
- Country: Iceland
- Language: Icelandic

Summerland (Icelandic: Sumarlandið) is an 80-minute 2010 Icelandic film, written and directed by Grímur Hákonarson, released by Blueeyes Productions/Sögn ehf.

The film is set in Kópavogur, a town south of Reykjavík strongly associated with urban legends about elves. The film takes its name from the place where spirits are said by one of the protagonists to go after death, a term attested more generally in Icelandic spiritualism.

== Synopsis ==
The main character of the film is Óskar Óskarsson (played by Kjartan Guðjónsson). Óskar's wife Lára (Ólafía Hrönn Jónsdóttir) is a professional medium and, in the film's account, is aware of her past lives, able to see and talk to ghosts and to at least perceive the reality of elves. She is self-possessed, benevolent and it is implied that her business working as a medium in the local community, in which Óskar is portrayed merely as an assistant, is a successful one. Meanwhile, Óskar does not believe in elves and does not seem altogether convinced about ghosts. He has taken out a loan secured against the family home to create a tawdry tourist-trap called ‘Ghost House’ in the basement, but the business is not going well. Óskar is portrayed as anxious, and uncomfortable in his own efforts to take on the role of a successful wheeler-dealer. He is unable to admit the family's impending bankruptcy to Lára, who finds out about it from the spirit of a dead person; ‘við hefðum aldrei átt að fara út í þennan túristabissness’ (‘we should never have gone into this tourist business’), she comments.

Lára and Óskar have two children: the teenager Ásdís (Hallfríður Tryggvadóttir), who tends to share her father's pragmatism and scepticism and later proves oblivious to the presence of ghosts, and the young boy Flóki (Nökkvi Helgason), who becomes best friends with a boy called Þrándur (Alexander Valur Wiium Brynjólfsson) who turns out to live in the elf-stone in the family's garden; Flóki later also proves able to see and talk to ghosts.

Faced with a forced sale of the house, Óskar agrees without telling Lára to the unexpected offer of an ostentatiously camp, gay German art-collector called Wolfgang Muller (Wolfgang Müller), who is enchanted by Icelanders’ credulity about elves, to buy the elf-stone in Óskar's garden for €50,000, clearing Óskar's debts and enabling him to buy an expensive flat-screen television. However, Þrándur disappears and Lára falls into a coma; it later emerges that the vengeful elves have moved to a nearby elf-stone called Grásteinn, taking Lára's spirit with them.

Meanwhile, the municipal authorities of Kópavogur are planning to sell Grásteinn in order to facilitate a road-widening project, despite mysterious technical problems and Lára's protestations. Recognising the reality of elves, Óskar and his children join protests at the building of the road; the leader of the protest makes a speech declaring

víð erum hér saman komin til að sýna samstöðu með álfunum! Þeir byggðu þetta land á undan okkur og við eigum að sýna þeim virðingu. Þessi steinn er hjarta Kópavogs. Við sættum okkur ekki ... við að hann sé gerður að söluvöru!

We have come together here to show our solidarity with the elves! They inhabited this land before us and we have to show them respect. This stone is the heart of Kópavogur. We won’t accept ... it being made into a commodity to be sold!

Óskar lies down in front of a bulldozer whose brakes, implicitly through the intervention of the elves, fail, killing Óskar, whereupon Lára awakes from her coma (somewhat disappointed to find that she has not arrived in Summerland). At Óskar's funeral, the priest declares

þessi hræðilegi atburður á eftir að lifa lengi með íslensku þjóðinni. Og við þurfum að draga lærdóm af honum. Við þurfum að viðurkenna það fyrir sjálfum okkur að við búum ekki ein í þessu landi. Og við þurfum að koma fram við náttúruna af virðingu og kærleik, en ekki með skammtíma gróðasjónarmið að leiðarljósi. Við erum hér samankomin í dag til þess að kveðja hugsjóna- og baráttumanninn, Óskar Óskarsson. Óskar fylgdi sannfæringu sinni allt til enda og hvikaði aldrei. Hann varaði við á meðan aðrir þögðu.

This terrible event must live long in the memory of the Icelandic people. And we have to learn from it. We have to recognise that we do not live alone in this land. And we have to treat the natural world with love and respect—not with short-term gain as our only goal. We have come here today to pay our respects to the idealist and activist Óskar Óskarsson. Óskar was true to his ideals to the end and never wavered. He spoke up when others remained silent.

The film ends with Óskar's ghost returning to his family to continue a happy family life there and to haunt his own ghost-house, while Ásis takes over the Ghost House business, which appears now to be a success.

A sub-plot in the film is Ásdís's relationship with Sverrir Þorsteinsson (Snorri Engilbertsson), chairman of the atheist organisation Andtrú (Disbelief), whose views are portrayed as extremist.

== Reception ==
Alaric Hall argued that while "in some ways, the film is scrupulously gender-balanced" and emphasises that Óskar's traditionalist model of masculinity is presented as outdated, "it takes a crisis caused by a man, and then makes the story all about the man"; in his view, the film "ultimately promotes a very traditional, nationalist view of masculinity".
