= Corridors of Power (TV series) =

- Genre: Comedy; Political satire
- Written by: Bill Harding; Graeme Koetsveld
- Directed by: Michael Carson
- Country of origin: Australia
- Original language: English
- No. of episodes: 6

Production
- Producers: Sharon O'Neill; Julia Peters
- Production companies: O'Neill and Peters Productions

Original release
- Network: ABC TV
- Release: 8 October – 12 November 2001

Corridors of Power is an Australian comedy television series that first screened on the ABC in 2001.

== Cast ==
- Philip Quast as Michael Fielding MP
- Jeremy Sims as Tony Dunne MP
- Anne Looby as Caroline Fielding
- Belinda McClory as Tanya Dunne
- Ed Wightman as Craig
- Kristy Wright as Vanessa 'Van' Harrison
- Simon Chilvers as Lester
- Alan David Lee as Kevin
- Essie Davis as Sophie

Serving politicians Bruce Baird, Bob Brown, Cheryl Kernot, Mark Latham, Christopher Pyne and Natasha Stott Despoja made cameos as themselves.

== List of episodes ==
(Episode information retrieved from Australian Television Information Archive).

No.	Title	Directed by	Written by	Original release date
1	"Episode 1"	Michael Carson	Graeme Koetsveld	8 October 2001
2	"Episode 2"	Michael Carson	Graeme Koetsveld	15 October 2001
3	"Episode 3"	Michael Carson	Bill Harding	22 October 2001
4	"Episode 4"	Michael Carson	Graeme Koetsveld	29 October 2001
5	"Episode 5"	Michael Carson	Bill Harding	5 November 2001
6	"Episode 6"	Michael Carson	Graeme Koetsveld	12 November 2001
