= Kópavogur Church =

Modernist church in Kópavogur, Iceland

- Kópavogskirkja
- West elevation
- Kópavogur Church
- 64°06′44″N 21°54′48″W
- Location: Borgarholt, Kársnes, Kópavogur, Iceland
- Country: Iceland
- Denomination: Church of Iceland

History
- Status: Parish church
- Consecrated: 16 December 1963

Architecture
- Functional status: Active
- Architect(s): Hörður Bjarnason; Ragnar Emilsson
- Architectural type: Church
- Style: Modernist
- Years built: 1958–1963

Administration
- Diocese: Reykjavik

Kópavogur Church

Kópavogur Church (Icelandic: Kópavogskirkja, Icelandic pronunciation: [ˈkʰouːpaˌvɔksˌcʰɪr̥ca]) is a church in Kópavogur, Iceland. It is located on Borgarholt hill at the top of Kársnes and offers a great view over Kópavogur, Reykjavík and surrounding area.

Work on it began in 1958 and it was opened on December 16, 1963. The architectural style of Kópavogur Church is modernist. Its architecture is unusual, it is the cross section of two wide arches. A curved arch protrudes in each direction with smaller arches extending below. Its profile is prominent in the Kópavogur town seal.

Architect Hörður Bjarnason together with Ragnar Emilsson designed this church. The church attracts the attention of both Icelanders and foreign tourists. The altarpiece in the church was set up in 1990 and is by artist Steinunn Þórarinsdóttir. Artist Barbara Árnason (1911–1975) designed various pictures that are in the church. Sculptor Gerður Helgadóttir (1928–1975) designed a sculpture.
