= Patrick White Playwrights' Award =

The Patrick White Playwrights' Award is an annual Australian literary award established jointly by the Sydney Theatre Company and The Sydney Morning Herald in honour of Patrick White's contribution to Australian theatre. The award was launched in 2000 and in 2011, was amended to include the Patrick White Fellowship.

The A$7,500 cash award is given for an unproduced play to foster the development of Australian playwrights. In addition, the winning play is given a public reading presented by the Sydney Theatre Company in association with the Sydney Writers' Festival.

The Patrick White Fellowship is A$25,000 for an established Australian playwright whose work has been produced professionally in Australia within the last four years in recognition of their contribution to the theatre and their art form. The inaugural recipient was Raimondo Cortese, and subsequent recipients have included Patricia Cornelius and Hilary Bell.

== Previous winners ==
- 2025: Karolina Ristevski, River Was Here (Award); Sheridan Harbridge (Fellowship)
- 2024: Wendy Mocke, Realish (Award); Joanna Murray-Smith (Fellowship)
- 2022/23: Aran Thangaratnam, love MAD GLITCH (Award); Wesley Enoch (Fellowship)
- 2021: Kamarra Bell-Wykes Whose Gonna Love 'Em? I am that i AM, (Award); Emme Hoy (Fellowship)
- 2020: Ra Chapman, K-BOX (Award); Angus Cerini (Fellowship)
- 2019: Keziah Warner, LuNa (Award); Anchuli Felicia King (Fellowship)
- 2018: Mark Rogers, Superheroes (Award); Nakkiah Lui (Fellowship)
- 2017: Kim Ho, Mirror's Edge (Award); Sue Smith (Fellowship)
- 2016: Lewis Treston, Hot Tub (Award); Andrew Bovell (Fellowship)
- 2015: Neil Levi, Kin (Award); Tommy Murphy (Fellowship)
- 2014: Debra Thomas, The Man's Bitch (Award); Kate Mulvany (Fellowship)
- 2013: Chris Summers, King Artur (Award); Angela Betzien (Fellowship)
- 2012: Anna Barnes, Minus One Sister (Award); Hilary Bell (Fellowship)
- 2011: Phillip Kavanagh, Little Borders (Award); Patricia Cornelius (Fellowship)
- 2010: Melissa Bubnic, Beached (Award); Raimondo Cortese (Fellowship)
- 2009: Ian Wilding, Forever Seven
- 2008: Nicki Bloom, Bloodwood
- 2007: Angus Cerini, Wretch and Timothy Daly, The Man in the Attic
- 2006: Patricia Cornelius, Do Not Go Gentle...
- 2005: Wesley Enoch, The Story of the Miracles at Cookie’s Table
- 2004: Stephen Carleton, Constance Drinkwater and the Final Days of Somerset
- 2003: David Milroy and Ningali Lawford, Windmill Baby
- 2002: Reg Cribb, Last Cab to Darwin and Ian Wilding, Even Amongst Dogs
- 2001: Brendan Cowell Bed; Toby Schmitz, Lucky and Jackie Smith, The Aliens
- 2000: Ben Ellis, Who Are You, Mr James? later produced as Post Felicity; Bette Guy Three Men - Three Chairs and Ailsa Piper Small Mercies
