= Grásteinn =

Stone on Álftanes, near Reykjavík, Iceland

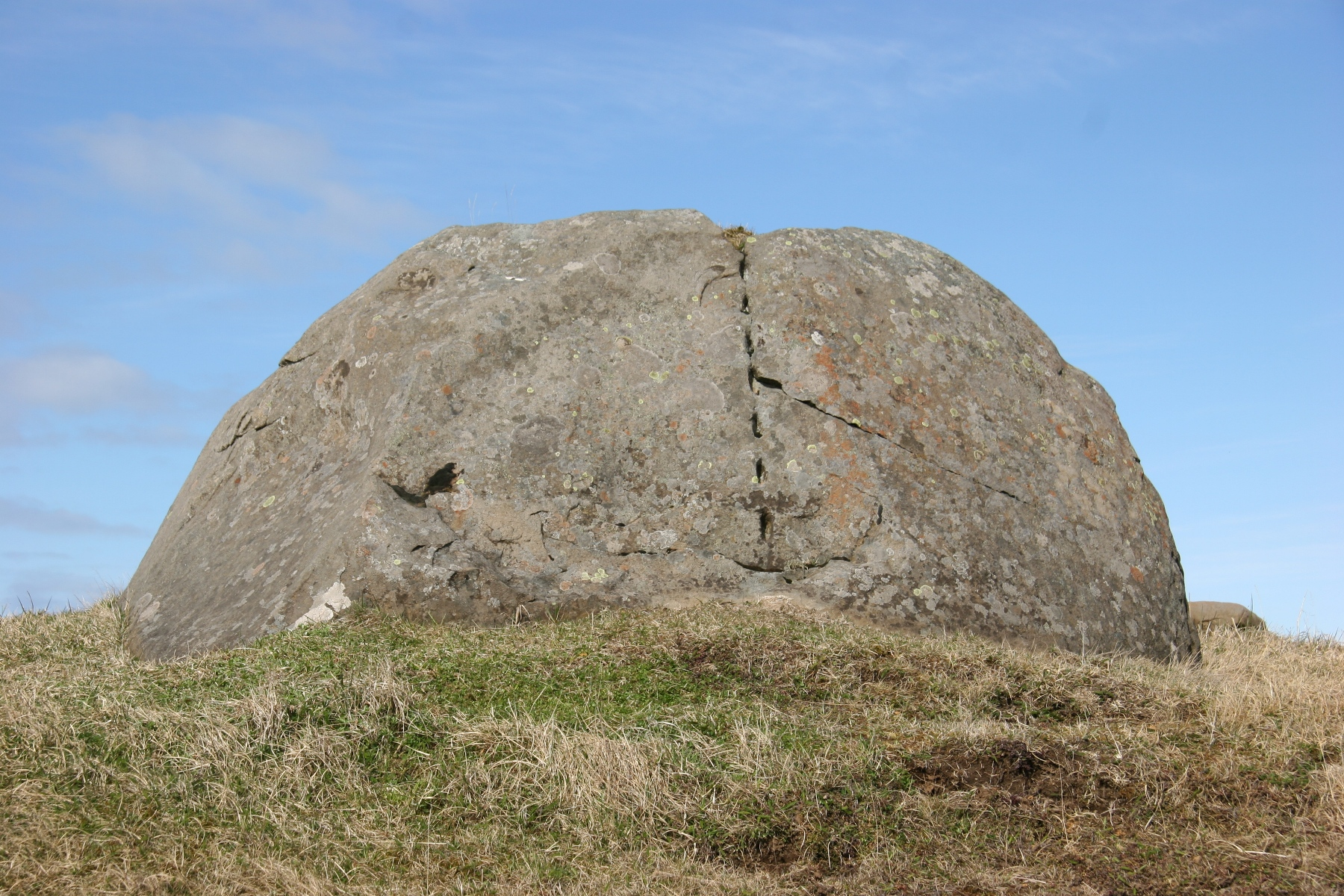
Grásteinn.

Grásteinn (Icelandic pronunciation: [ˈkrauːˌsteitn̥], 'grey stone') is a stone on Álftanes, near Reykjavík in Iceland. At Grandinn when driving from Garðabær to Álftanes is a crossroads. Bessastaðir is to the right, Suðurnesvegur to the left and Norðurnesvegur straight forward. To the south of this crossroads is the marker-stone Grásteinn, which is a lodestone.

On the stone are marks showing that someone has tried to move it during roadwork in the 20th century. While trying to move it, it seemed to people that the nearby farm Eyvindarstaðir was on fire, and they stopped trying to move it. Grásteinn is also associated with the belief that things will go well for the wayfarer who passes it carefully.

The Elf-Stones are several stones to the south of Grásteinn. Elves are supposed to live in them.

Grásteinn is portrayed in the film Sumarlandið by Grimur Hákonarson, where it is Grásteinn itself that is an elf-stone.

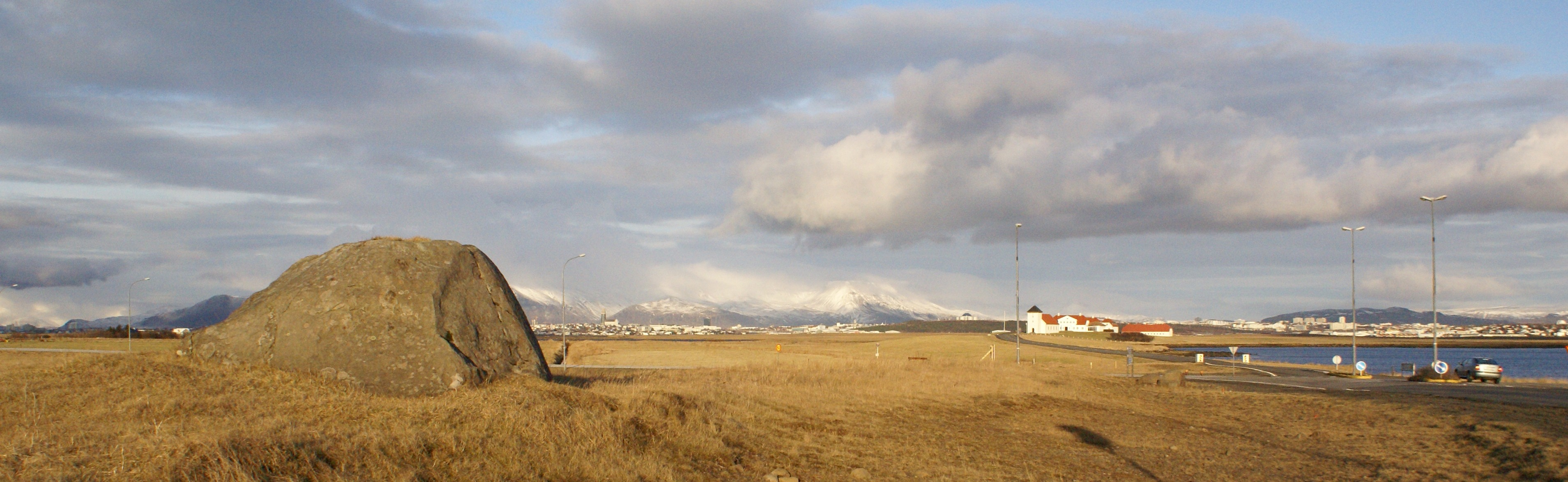
Grásteinn

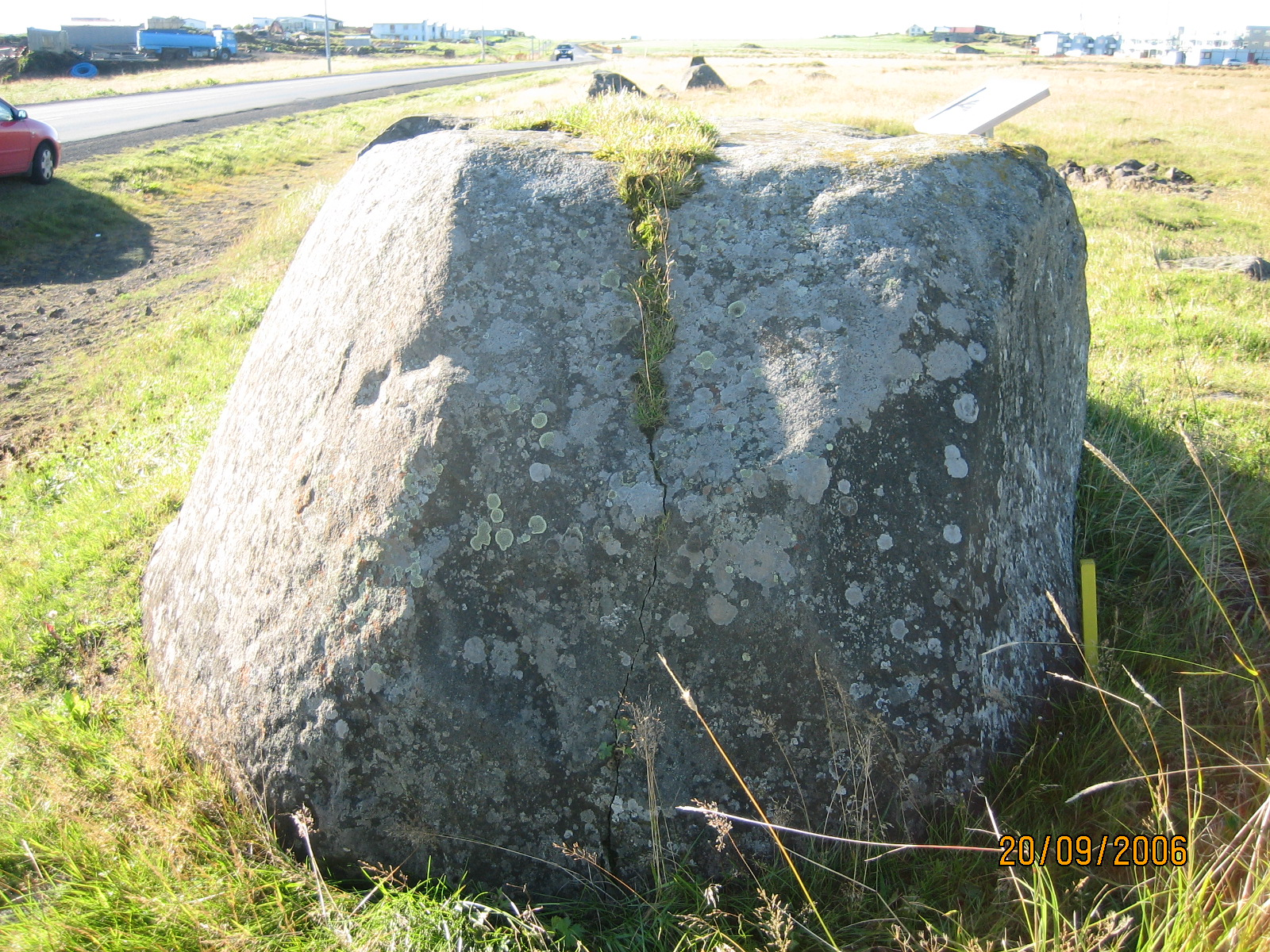
Grásteinn

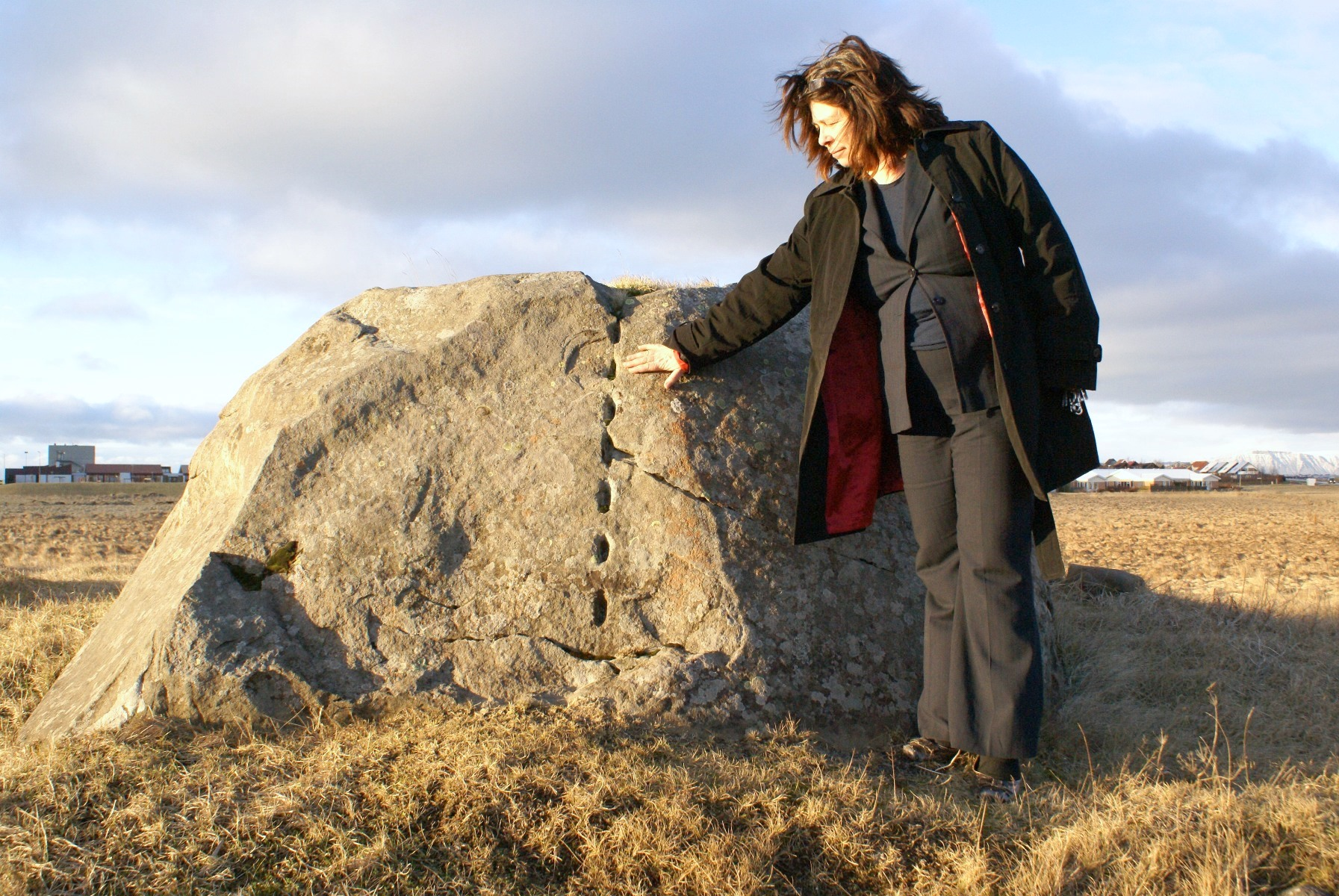
Grásteinn

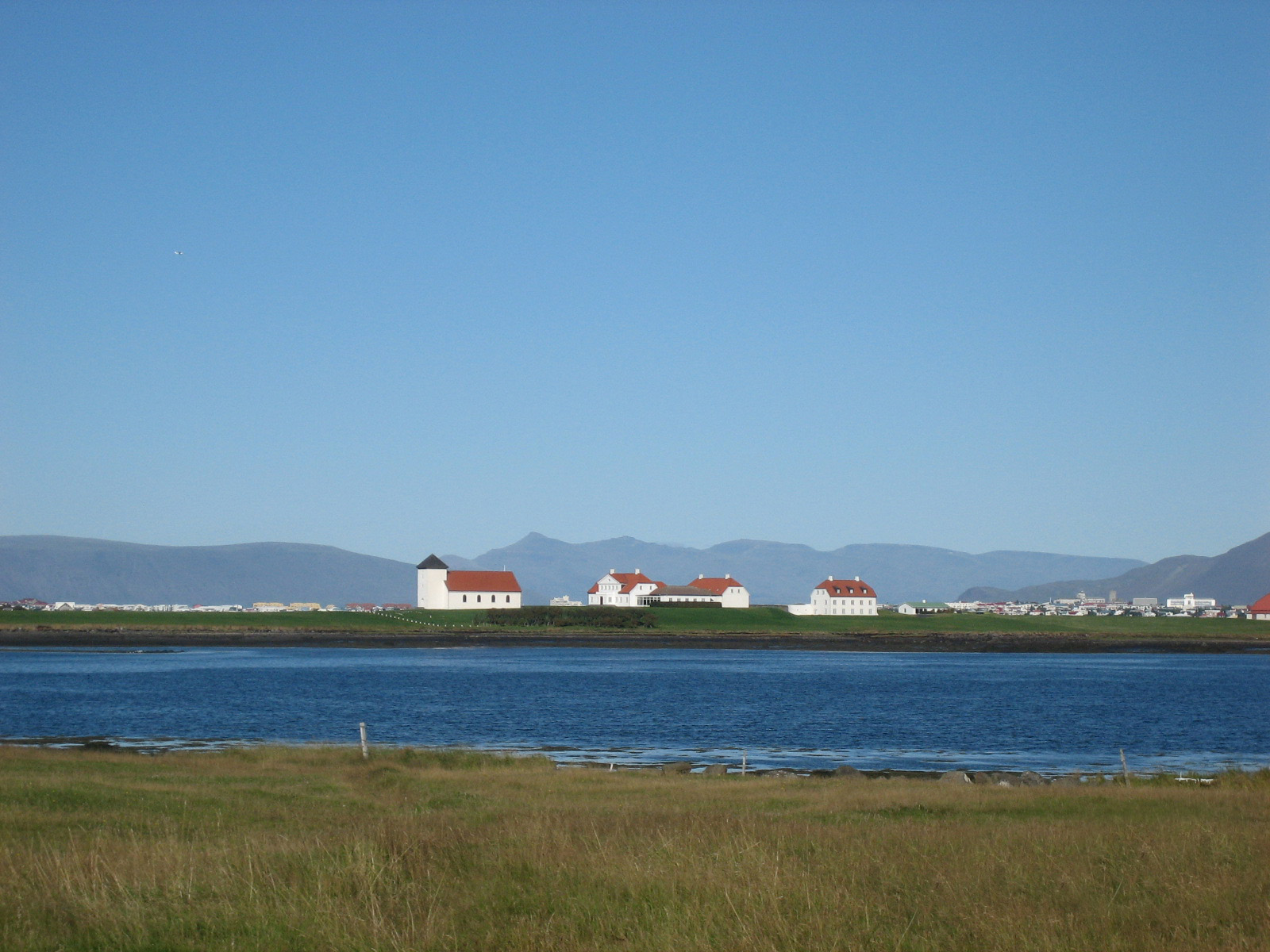
Bessastaðir

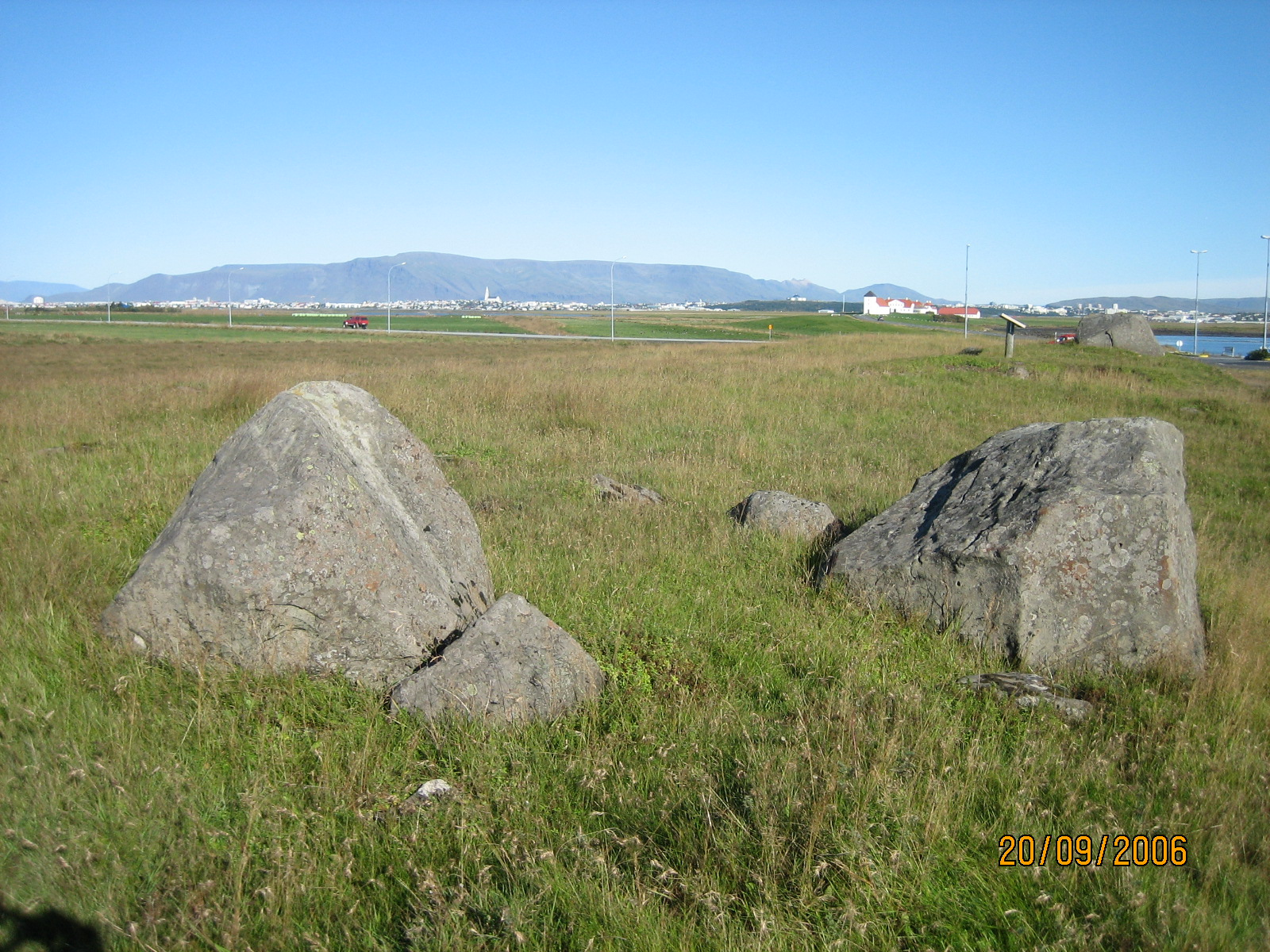
Álfasteinar
