= Ningali Lawford =

Australian actress (1967–2019)

- Born: Ningali Josie Lawford; 1967; Wangkatjungka, Western Australia, Australia
- Died: 11 August 2019 (aged 52); Edinburgh, Scotland
- Other names: Josie Ningali Lawford, Ningali Lawford-Wolf
- Occupation: Actor
- Years active: 1990–2019

Ningali Josie Lawford (1967 – 11 August 2019), also known as Ningali Lawford-Wolf and Josie Ningali Lawford, was an Aboriginal Australian actress known for her roles in the films Rabbit-Proof Fence (2002), Bran Nue Dae (2009), and Last Cab to Darwin (2015), for which she was nominated for the AACTA Award for Best Actress in a Leading Role.

== Early life and education ==
Ningali Josie Lawford was born in 1967 on Christmas Creek Station, a cattle station in Wangkatjungka, near Fitzroy Crossing in Western Australia, where her father, a stockman, and mother, a domestic, worked. She was a member of the Walmadjari (Tjiwaling) people, and of the Wangkatjunga language group.

After attending Kewdale Senior High School in Perth, she spent a year in Anchorage, Alaska, on an American Field Scholarship.

Lawford trained in dance at the Aboriginal Islander Dance Theatre (AIDT) in Sydney.

== Career ==
After leaving AIDT, Lawford started to dance at Bangarra Dance Theatre. She later became a cultural consultant and voice artist for various productions at the company, and was a guest performer on two productions in 2002.

Lawford made her acting debut in the musical Bran Nue Dae, which premiered in Perth in 1990. She later appeared in the 2009 film version.

In 1994, Lawford premiered her one-woman show, Ningali, in Perth. It was co-written by stage directors Robyn Archer and Angela Chaplin, whom she had met the previous year. The show toured internationally and won the Fringe First Award for Best New Production at the 1995 Edinburgh Festival Fringe and the 1996 Green Room Award for Best Actress in a One Woman Show. Other theatre roles included Aliwa for Company B Belvoir (2001), Uncle Vanya (2005) and Jandamarra (2008) both for Black Swan Theatre Company.

In 2000, the satirical comedy Black and Tran premiered at the Melbourne Comedy Festival. It was a collaboration between Lawford and Vietnamese comedian Hung Le. It addressed "the issue of racial discrimination by ridiculing the stereotypes of Aboriginal and Vietnamese cultures".

Lawford played Maude, the mother of protagonist Molly, in the 2002 film Rabbit-Proof Fence.

In 2015, Lawford played the role of Polly in the film Last Cab to Darwin, for which she received an AACTA Award nomination for Best Actress in a Leading Role.

In 2017, Lawford voiced the character of Nanna on the National Indigenous Television (NITV) animated series Little J & Big Cuz, which features Indigenous Australian characters.

Lawford was involved in the development of The Secret River at the Sydney Theatre Company, narrating its return Sydney season and national tour in 2016, Adelaide Festival performances in 2018 and Edinburgh Festival performances in 2019.

== Personal life ==
Lawford had five children and two grandchildren. She moved to Kalbarri later in her career to pursue a break away from being an actress and to also spend more time raising her children before returning to film.

Actor and musician Mark Coles Smith reported on Take 5 (a show hosted by Zan Rowe on ABC Television) that Lawford was his grandmother. (Note: However, he is not listed as one of her grandchildren in a Guardian article published after her death, and there is only a 20-year age difference between the two.) He reported that, sometime when dancing with Bangarra in Sydney, she had a three-month relationship with David Bowie, who wanted her to return to Berlin with him, but she refused.

== Death ==
Lawford died of complications following a severe asthma attack while in Edinburgh, Scotland, during the 2019 Sydney Theatre Company tour of The Secret River, aged 52.

== Acting credits ==
=== Film ===
Year	Title	Role	Refs
2002	Rabbit-Proof Fence	Maude	
2009	Bran Nue Dae	Theresa Johnson	
2015	Last Cab to Darwin	Polly	

=== Stage ===
Year	Title	Role	Notes	Refs
1994–1996	Ningali	Herself	Deckchair Theatre	
2001	Aliwa	Mum	Company B Belvoir	
2002	Day in '67		Perth Festival with Yirra Yaakin Theatre Company	
2005	Uncle Vanya		Black Swan State Theatre Company	
2004; 2014	Windmill Baby	Maymay / Wun-man / Two-man / Aunty Darbella	STC (also co-writer)	
2008	Jandamarra	Jini	Black Swan State Theatre Company for Perth International Arts Festival	
2015–2017; 2018	The Secret River	Dhirrumbin / Narrator	Australian national tour, Adelaide Festival with STC,	
2018	The Long Forgotten Dream	Lizzie / South Spirit	Sydney Opera House with STC	
2019	The Secret River	Dhirrumbin / Narrator	Edinburgh Fringe Festival, Scotland with STC	

=== Television ===
Year	Title	Role	Notes	Refs
2007–2010	The Circuit	Louise		
2009	3 Acts of Murder	Emily Dooley	Television movie	
2017	Little J & Big Cuz	Nanna	Voice, 13 episodes	
2018	Mystery Road	Dot		
2019	Upright	Danni		
2019	KGB	Jack's Mum		

== Awards and nominations ==
Lawford won awards for her one-woman theatre show Ningali, and for Aliwa, Uncle Vanya and Jandamarra.

Year	Association	Category	Nominated work	Result	Refs
1995	Edinburgh Fringe Festival	Fringe First Award for Best New Production	Ningali	Won	
1996	Green Room Awards	Best Actress in a One Woman Show	Ningali	Won	
2003	Patrick White Playwrights' Award		Windmill Baby	Won	
2015	AACTA Awards	Best Actress in a Leading Role	Last Cab to Darwin	Nominated	
2019	Equity Foundation	10th Annual Equity Lifetime Achievement Award	Ningali Lawford (joint award with Lillian Crombie)	Honoured	
