= Patricia Cornelius =

Australian playwright

- Born: 1952 (age 73–74)
- Occupation: Playwright
- Writing career
- Notable awards: Victorian Premier's Literary Awards — Prize for Drama, winner 2014

Patricia Cornelius (born 1952) is an Australian playwright and co-founder of Melbourne Workers Theatre.

== Career ==
Cornelius has written many plays, including Slut (2008, Platform Youth Theatre), The Call (2009, Griffin Theatre Company), Good, Do Not Go Gentle… (2010, fortyfivedownstairs), Boy Overboard (2004, Australian Theatre for Young People), Love (2005, Malthouse Theatre), Lilly and May and Hog's Hairs and Leeches and co-authored The Audition (2019, 2024, Outer Urban Projects).

Her first novel, My Sister Jill, was published in 2003 by St. Martin's Press.

Cornelius also co-wrote the screenplay of the 2009 film Blessed, based on Who's Afraid of the Working Class, with co-writers Andrew Bovell, Melissa Reeves and Christos Tsiolkas. It won the Best Screenplay at the 2009 San Sebastian International Film Festival and an AWGIE Award for Feature Film Adaptation in 2009.

== Awards ==
Cornelius has won numerous awards, including AWGIE Awards, Green Room Awards and in 2006, the Patrick White Playwrights' Award. Her 2005 play, Love, won the Wal Cherry Prize for New Plays. Her 2010 play Do Not Go Gentle... received the NSW Premier's Literary Award for Drama in 2011 and won the 2011 Victorian Premier's Louis Esson Prize for Drama. Cornelius won the 2019 Windham–Campbell Literature Prize in Drama.

In 2018 she was awarded the Mona Brand Award for Australian women stage and screenwriters. She also received a lifetime achievement award at the 2019 Green Room Awards.

== Bibliography ==
=== Novels ===
- My Sister Jill (2002)

=== Screenplays ===
- Blessed (2009)

=== Drama ===
- Lily and May (1987)
- Taxi (1990) (with Vicki Reynolds)
- Little City (1996) (with Daniel Keene and Melissa Reeves)
- Blunt (2002)
- Love (2003)
- Boy Overboard (2005) (adaptation of Boy Overboard by Morris Gleitzman)
- Love (2006)
- Slut (2008)
- The Call (2009)
- Slut (2008)
- Good, Do Not Go Gentle… (2010)
- SHIT (2017)
- Lovely Lovely Sometimes Ugly (2019)
- Anthem (2019) (with Andrew Bovell and Melissa Reeves)
- Runt (2023)
- Hog's Hairs and Leeches (2024)
- Bad Boy (2024)
- The Audition (2019, 2024) (with Christos Tsiolkas, Melissa Reeves, Milad Norouzi, Sahra Davoudi, Tes Lyssiotis and Wahibe Moussa)
- TRUTH (2025)
