= Sanctuary (play) =

Play by David Williamson

- Written by: David Williamson
- Characters: Bob King; John Alderston
- Original language: English
- Setting: Queensland

Premiere
- Date premiered: 1994

Sanctuary is a 1994 play by Australian playwright David Williamson. He said "The play taps into the new radicalism among students in communications. They know about the power elite, come out breathing fire about the state of the Australian media and usually end up working for the major broadsheets." He added, "the real theme of Sanctuary is male competitiveness. Ironically the young student in Sanctuary yearns to be like Bob King while pretending that's the last thing in the world he wants."

== Summary ==
Sanctuary is a two-act play set in the Gold Coast retreat belonging to retired Australian foreign correspondent Robert 'Bob' King (late 40s). Mr King has lived a full life of charismatic success in the US, reporting on stories from all around the world. His integrity comes under scrutiny in the play by its only other character, John Alderston (25), a student about to publish King's biography. John harbours a deep hatred for King because of his dishonesty throughout his career and failure to report on four major genocides.

It becomes apparent that through John's research, he has compiled an account of King's life, and seeks to hold him accountable for unquestionably serving the American and International mass media. He argues that King sold himself out to Governments for cash, telling selected stories the way he was instructed to. He also mistreated his several wives and ignored the larger world issues for his success.

Williamson chiefly refers to Guatemala, East Timor, El Salvador, and Cambodia as illustrations, but the focus is always on King's integrity and how he let those stories go untold.

John's character is seen to become more and more complex as King probes back, uncovering a history of parental neglect and sexual abuse, which appears to be the seed of John's hatred long ago. As the story unfolds, violent arguments break out and result in a savage beating, in which John temporarily blinds Bob at the end of the first act. The second act is composed of similar arguments, as each challenges the other's true values.

Bob gives a good account of his life and attempts to pardon himself, while John (panicking over possible jail time for the assault) refuses to call emergency help for Bob (still blind). In the end, Bob convinces John to call an ambulance before another violent outburst sends John into a psychotic frenzy, in which he beats Bob to death with a ceramic sculpture.

The result is a thorough dissection of the shortcomings of the mass media, a detailed explanation of several world issues that had been falsely reported or not reported at all, and a remotely humorous argument between two deeply disturbed people.

== Background ==
Williamson later said he wrote the play "in just ten days, in the white heat of passion and disgust at American foreign policy in Iraq – sometimes the momentum just takes over.”

== Reception ==
Reviews for the play were excellent.

== Film ==
The play was turned into a film and released with the same title in 1995. Its setting was changed from the Gold Coast to Sydney.
