= Grímur Hákonarson =

Icelandic film director and screenwriter

- Born: 1977 (age 48–49); Iceland
- Occupations: film director; screenwriter
- Awards: Edda Award for Best Director

Grímur Hákonarson (born 1977) is an Icelandic film director and screenwriter. His first feature film was Summerland from 2010, for which Grímur was nominated for the Edda Award for Best Screenplay. His next feature film was Rams, about two estranged brothers on the Icelandic countryside who come together to save their sheep. The film was selected for the Un Certain Regard section of the 2015 Cannes Film Festival and won the Un Certain Regard Award.

== Filmography ==
=== Feature films ===
Year	English Title	Original Title	Notes
2010	Summerland	Sumarlandið	
2015	Rams	Hrútar	
2019	The County	Héraðið	
TBA	A Favour		In production

=== Documentaries ===
- Varði Goes Europe (2002)
- A Pure Heart (Hreint hjarta) (2012)

=== Short films ===
- Last Words of Hreggviður (2004)
- Slavek the Shit (2005)
- Wrestling (Bræðrabylta) (2007)
