= The Return (play) =

Play by Reg Cribb

The Return is an Australian play by Reg Cribb.

In 2001 it won the Patrick White Playwrights' Award and was shortlisted for the Queensland Premier's Literary Award.

In 2006 Reg Cribb adapted it to film, retitling it Last Train to Freo (2006).

The play has been presented several times since then.
