= Reg Cribb =

Australian playwright and actor

Reginald Cribb is an Australian playwright and actor.

== Early life and education ==
Cribb is from Perth, Western Australia.

Cribb graduated from National Institute of Dramatic Art at the University of New South Wales in 1990.

== Writing career ==
Cribb's first play, Night of the Sea Monkey, was performed in 1999.

His play Gulpilil, co-written with David Gulpilil about Gulpilil's life, was performed in March 2004 at the Adelaide Festival of Arts, performed by Gulpilil, to standing ovations. It was directed by Neil Armfield. The show was later staged in Brisbane and Sydney.

Country Song is a play about Indigenous Australian singer and musician Jimmy Little, performed by the Queensland Theatre Company at the Cremorne Theatre at the Queensland Performing Arts Centre in August 2015.

With Rachel Perkins, Cribb co-wrote the screenplay for the 2009 movie Bran Nue Dae, based on the 1989 stage musical Bran Nue Dae written by Jimmy Chi.

=== Plays ===
Cribb's other plays include:

- The Return (adapted to the film Last Train to Freo)
- Last Cab to Darwin
- The Chatroom
- Ruby's Last Dollar, an adaptation of Uncle Vanya
- Unaustralia
- Mt Ragged
- Krakouer
- Thomas Murray and the Upside Down River, performed by the Griffin Theatre in January 2016 then touring nationally in 2018

== Acting career ==
Cribb appeared in the film A Country Life.

He appeared in Home and Away during the 1990s, with appearances in G.P., A Country Practice and Police Rescue. He also sang the song "Banana Holiday" on the ABC children's TV series Bananas in Pyjamas with Monica Trapaga as well as the main cast of the show.

Stage history includes Rosencrantz and Guildenstern Are Dead, Hester, The Players, Face to Face, Romeo and Juliet and The Turning.

== Awards ==
- 2003, for Last Cab to Darwin:
  - Queensland Premier's Literary Award
  - Patrick White Playwrights' Award,
  - WA Premier's Award for Best Script, overall 2003 WA Premier's Award (the first to win this award),
  - WA Equity Award for Best New Script
  - Shortlisted, Victorian Premier's Literary Award, the NSW Premier's Literary Award and the 2003 Australian Writers Guild Award
- 2001: Patrick White Playwrights, Award, for The Return
- 2001: The Return shortlisted for the Qld Premier's Literary Award
- 2004: The Chatroom, shortlisted for the 2004 Patrick White Playwrights Award, the 2005 Qld Premier's Literary Award and the 2005 WA Premier's Literary Award.
- 2001: Gulpilil, shortlisted for the Australian Writers Guild Award
- ?: Ruby's Last Dollar, shortlisted for the Victorian Premier's Literary Award and the WA Equity Awards
- 2006: Last Train to Freo screenplay – WA Premier's Award; nominated for the Qld Premier's Literary Award and Victorian Premier's Literary Award, as well as an AWGIE and Best Adapted Screenplay in the AFI Awards and Critics Circle Awards
- 2013: Rodney Seaborn Playwrights Award, for Country Song
- 2015: Professional in residence at the Perth's Film & Television Institute
