= Last Train to Freo =

- DVD cover
- Directed by: Jeremy Sims
- Screenplay by: Reg Cribb
- Based on: The Return by Reg Cribb
- Produced by: Lisa Duff; Greg Duffy; Sue Taylor
- Starring: Steve Le Marquand; Tom Budge; Gigi Edgley
- Cinematography: Toby Oliver
- Edited by: Merlin Cornish
- Distributed by: Intandem Films
- Release date: 14 September 2006 (Australia)
- Running time: 89 min
- Country: Australia
- Language: English
- Budget: $1.2m
- Box office: $102,726

Last Train to Freo is a 2006 Australian film based on Reg Cribb's 2001 play The Return, and directed by Jeremy Sims.

== Synopsis ==
Two thugs from the Perth suburb of Midland catch the last train to Fremantle. When a young woman, unaware that the train guards are on strike, boards the train several stops later, the thugs are interested by her. After two others – an older woman and a silent man – board the train, it becomes apparent that not everybody on the train is who they appear to be.

== Cast ==
- Steve Le Marquand – the Tall Thug
- Tom Budge – Trev
- Gigi Edgley – Lisa
- Glenn Hazeldine – Simon
- Gillian Jones – Maureen
- Lisa Hensley – voice of train announcer
- Reg Cribb – man on platform

== Awards ==
2006 Australian Film Institute

- Best Lead Actor – Steve Le Marquand – nomination
- Best Screenplay – Adapted – Reg Cribb – nomination
- Best Supporting Actor – Tom Budge – nomination

Film Critics Circle of Australia Awards

- Best Actor in a Lead Role – Steve Le Marquand – nomination
- Best Actor in a Supporting Role – Tom Budge – nomination
- Best Actress in a Lead Role – Gigi Edgley – nomination
- Best Actress in a Supporting Role – Gillian Jones – nomination
- Best Screenplay – Adapted – Reg Cribb – nomination

== Box office ==
Last Train to Freo grossed $102,726 at the box office in Australia.

== See also ==
- Cinema of Australia
