= Ann Turner (director) =

Australian film director, screenwriter and novelist

- Born: 1960 (age 65–66); Adelaide, South Australia, Australia
- Education: Victorian College of the Arts Film School (formerly Swinburne Film School)
- Occupations: Director, Screenwriter, Producer, Author
- Years active: 1981– present
- Notable work: Flesh on Glass (1981 Film) Celia (1989 Film) Hammers Over the Anvil (1992 Film) Turtle Beach (1992 Film) Dallas Doll (1994 Film) Irresistible (2006 Film) The Lost Swimmer (2015 Novel) Out of the Ice (2016 Novel)
- Website: https://www.annturnerauthor.com/

Ann Turner (born 1960) is an Australian filmmaker and novelist. Her films explore social and psychological themes, centering on strong female characters. Turner is writer-director of four feature dramas – Celia (1989), Hammers Over The Anvil (1993), Dallas Doll (1994) and Irresistible (2006) one of only three Australian women to achieve this distinction. Her novels include The Lost Swimmer (2015) and Out of the Ice (2016) both of which were nominated for literary awards. Turner has also worked as a screenwriter, producer, script consultant, teacher and film industry administrator.

Turner was born in Adelaide, South Australia and has made Melbourne, Victoria her home since 1979. She is graduate of the Victorian College of the Arts School of Film and Television, where she also lectured. Turner's screenplays have attracted international stars including Russell Crowe, Charlotte Rampling, Susan Sarandon, Sam Neill, Emily Blunt and Rose Byrne. Her work has received multiple awards and nominations including the Grand Prix at the Creteil International Women's Film Festival for Celia (1989) and Best Adaptation, Feature Film at the Australian Writers Guild AWGIE awards for the screenplay of Blanche D'Alpuget's novel Turtle Beach (1992). Turner's films have screened at major international festivals, including Berlin, New York, London, Sitges and Melbourne.

== Early life and education ==
Ann Turner was born in 1960 in Adelaide, South Australia, the youngest of four girls. She credits a time of freedom in the long summer holidays as being an inspiration for her critically acclaimed debut feature film Celia. She has described her feelings that Adelaide, renowned as the City of Churches, had a dark underbelly, a sensibility that has spilled into her films and later, her novels.

In the late 1970s Turner moved to Melbourne for her education at Swinburne Film School (now part of the Victorian College of the Arts), and she has remained in Melbourne ever since. During her studies, Turner worked as a camera operator at the metropolitan horse races. In her final year at Swinburne Film School in 1981, Turner won the Screenwriting Award for her 40-minute film Flesh on Glass, an exploration of desire, religion and feminism. Flesh on Glass received an Honorable Mention at the Universiade International Student Festival, Edmonton, Canada, in 1982. It screened at Melbourne International Film Festival in 1982, was broadcast on ABC television and toured Australia as part of a National Film Theatre of Australia program. Flesh on Glass is available to view on the Victorian College of the Arts Digital Archive.

== Career ==
After graduating from Film School, Turner's first full-time employment was as Creative Development Officer at Film Victoria (1983-1985). Here Turner set-up a professional attachment scheme that continues after 40 years.

Turner worked as a Senior Script Consultant at the Australian Film Commission (1985-1987) where she was responsible for funding new screenwriters.

=== Debut Feature Film, Celia (1989) ===
Turner wrote the screenplay of Celia over a period of 6 years at nights and weekends while she was working full time. Celia won the Monte Miller Award for Best Unproduced Screenplay at the 1984 Australian Writers Guild AWGIE awards.

Turner filmed Celia in suburban Melbourne in the summer of 1988. The story is based around the Victorian Government's rabbit muster of 1958, in which Premier Henry Bolte banned pet rabbits and children had to relinquish their pets to the zoo. The zoo scenes of Celia were shot at Abbotsford Convent standing in for Melbourne zoo.

Told through the eyes of a nine-year-old child in a much-lauded performance by Rebecca Smart (The Shiralee, The Coca Cola Kid), Celia is a coming-of-age drama about the wonder, vulnerability and horror of childhood set against the Communist witch-hunts of the 1950s. Celia received international acclaim and has continued to find new audiences over thirty-five years. It was released on Blu-Ray in 2021 by prestigious distributors Second Run in the United Kingdom and Severin Films in the US, the latter as part of a compendium of horror films, All The Haunts Be Ours.

In 2014 Samuel Wigley on the British Film Institute website listed Celia in '10 great films about childhood' alongside works by directors Ingmar Bergman, Steven Spielberg, Louis Malle, Yasujiro Ozu, Satyajit Ray, Carlos Saura and John Boorman. In 2015 Little White Lies included Celia in 100 Great Movies By Female Directors, celebrating the greatest female artists in the film industry from 1912 to 2014. In 2016 Leigh Singer on The BFI website included Celia in '1 0 great dark suburbia films' in a list with All That Heaven Allows, The Swimmer, The Stepford Wives, Poltergeist and Blue Velvet. Horror aficionado Kim Newman called Celia 'one of the great movies about the terrors, wonders and strangeness of childhood.'

In 2017 Celia was restored by Australia's National Film and Sound Archive. This restored version of Celia screened at Melbourne International Film Festival in 2017 in a series of films entitled "Pioneering Australian Women Filmmakers. "At this screening, Nick Dent in Time Out called it 'an out-and-out film masterpiece, one of the best films about childhood since The 400 Blows."

Celia received the Grand Prix at the Creteil International Women's Film Festival in Paris in 1989; a Commendation in the Charlie Chaplin New Directors Award at the 43rd Edinburgh International Film Festival, a prize introduced that year by festival director David Robinson to promote young filmmaking talent; nominee Best Film, Sitges Catalonian International Film Festival. Rebecca Smart won Best Actress Award at Salso Maggiore Film Festival, Victoria Longley won Best Supporting Actress at the 1989 AFI Awards and Mary-Anne Fahey was nominated for Best Supporting Actress at the 1989 AFI Awards.

Celia screened at many international film festivals including Berlin International Film Festival, London Film Festival, New Directors/New Films Festival in New York, Gotheburg Film Festival Sweden, International Film Festival of India, Tokyo International Film Festival, Vancouver International Film Festival, USA Film Festival, Dallas, and Wellington Film Festival.

=== 1990s ===
Turner wrote the screenplay of Blanche D'Alpuget's novel Turtle Beach (1992) for which she won Best Feature Adaptation, Australian Writers Guild AWGIE Awards in 1992.

Hammers Over The Anvil (1993), based on the short stories of Alan Marshall, was Turner's second feature film as director, which she co-wrote with Peter Hepworth. Starring Russell Crowe, Charlotte Rampling and Alexander Outhred it screened at the 1993 Berlin International Film Festival. It also screened at numerous other overseas festivals including the Stockholm International Film Festival and Seattle International Film Festival, (1993), where Russell Crowe won the Golden Space Needle Award for Best Actor, which he shared with his performance in Geoffrey Wright's Romper Stomper.

Alexander Outhred won Best Young Actor at the 1992 Australian Film Institute Awards. In 1993 Turner was nominated for Best Adapted Screenplay at the 1993 AWGIE awards, along with her co-writer Peter Hepworth.

In 1994 Turner wrote and directed the black comedy Dallas Doll, starring Victoria Longley, Sandra Bernhard, Frank Gallacher and Rose Byrne. It was Rose Byrne's first film role. Turner was nominated for Best Original Screenplay at the 1994 AWGIE awards. Dallas Doll screened at numerous overseas festivals including London, Seattle and Chicago. It was the closing night film of the Los Angeles Gay and Lesbian Film Festival in 1994.

Film reviewer Jonathan Rosenbaum, former chief critic of the Chicago Reader, wrote that the film is "full of unpredictable quirks and fresh performances", Australian film academic and critic Barbara Creed wrote in The Age that Dallas Doll had inspired comic sequences... hilarious seduction scenes... an absurdist comic vision of suburban Australia that is wicked and amusing." Steve Beard in Empire magazine called the film "... an amusing, unpredictable comedy about an American golf pro who moves to Australia, seduces a family and wins over a town... an allegory that indicts the seductive nature of an American lifestyle. Dallas is as dishonest and corrupting as she is charming. But despite the damage she does, Dallas is not all bad... a highly entertaining film."

In 1995, Turner was invited to take part in the British international television series Picture House (BBC/Arts Council of England), alongside esteemed auteurs Atom Egoyan, Claire Denis, Raul Ruiz, Guy Madden, Krystof Zanussi and Paul Schrader. Each director was asked to pick a painting of their choice and make a short film about it. The filmmakers were given complete creative freedom. Turner's short film Bathing Boxes (1995) was inspired by Jeffrey Smart's painting of the same name. Bathing Boxes screened at numerous prestigious international festivals including New York International Film Festival, Melbourne International Film Festival and Oberhausen International Short Film Festival. Bathing Boxes starred Heather Mitchell, Frances O'Connor and Stephen Whittaker.

=== 2000s ===
In 2005 Turner wrote and directed the Australian psychological thriller Irresistible, starring Susan Sarandon, Sam Neill, Emily Blunt, Bud Tingwell, William McInnes and Alethea McGrath. Shot in Melbourne, Victoria, the film explores gaslighting and stalking from a feminist perspective.

Irresistible was nominated for the Australian Writers Guild AWGIE Award for Best Original Screenplay in 2006 and shortlisted for the Queensland Premier's Literary Award, Best Original Screenplay in 2006. In 2006 Irresistible screened at Parliament House in Canberra, Australia, hosted by the Australian Minister for the Arts and Sport, the Honourable Senator Rod Kemp.

Irresistible was released theatrically including Australia, United Kingdom, Italy and Spain. It achieved DVD rentals of $6.8 million in the USA.

=== 2010s ===
In 2012 Turner was invited to take part in the prestigious Sight and Sound Directors Poll, one of only 358 directors in the world to take part. The Directors Poll complements the celebrated Sight and Sound Critics poll. Both polls are run every 10 years.

In 2015 Simon and Schuster Australia published Turner's debut novel The Lost Swimmer, a psychological thriller set in Victoria, Australia and Europe. The novel was subsequently published by Simon and Schuster in the UK in 2016 and USA in 2017.

In Australia, The Lost Swimmer reached best-selling status and was shortlisted for a 2016 Davitt Award in the category of Debut Fiction and long-listed for the 2016 Indie Book Awards – Debut Fiction. It was Readings Bookstore's Book of the Month in June 2015, one of Apple iBooks' Best Books of June, and Better Reading's Book of the Week 9 June 2015. Kobo listed it in the Best Aussie Reads of 2015.

In 2016 Simon and Schuster Australia published Turner's second novel, Out of the Ice, a psychological thriller set in Antarctica, USA, Europe and Australia. Out of the Ice was shortlisted in the Best Crime Fiction category of the Ned Kelly Awards, Australia's leading awards for crime writing. It was one of iBooks Australia's Best Books of June 2016, Kobo's Mystery Suspense Pick of the Month, Newslink's Pick of the Month – Literary Fiction, a Collins Booksellers' Fiction Book of the Month and a Better Reading Book of the Week. Kobo listed it in the Best Books of 2016.

In 2017 Out of the Ice was published by Simon and Schuster UK , and published in the US in 2018 by Simon and Schuster.

=== 2020s ===
In the 2020s Turner's films have continued to find new audiences.

On 18 October 2021 Celia was released on Blu-ray in the United Kingdom by Second Run. Turner (with Annabelle Murphy) co-wrote, co-directed, co-produced and co-edited a 60-minute documentary Celia's World for the Blu-ray with Turner interviewing academics/intellectuals Professor Barbara Creed, Professor Sheila Fitzpatrick, Professor Ann Curthoys, Dr John Docker and Annette Blonski who were children of communists and socialists in the 1950s to provide a context for the politics in the film. Professor Joy Damousi AM gave an historic overview for the documentary and Dr Mary Tomsic provided commentary.

In December 2021 Celia was released on Blu-ray as part of American company Severin's international folk-horror anthology All The Haunts Be Ours. A 40-minute documentary on Turner titled Celia and Me directed by Briony Kidd was released as part of the Blu-ray. Celia screened at the Thornbury Picture House in Melbourne, Australia in 2024 with Turner interviewed by film critic Digby Houghton.Celia was available for streaming on Mubi in 2026.

Turner was invited to take part in Sight and Sound's 2022 Directors' 100 Greatest Films of All Time poll. As described by the BFI, "in 2022 480 invited directors returned ballots… In every case, the voter is a director of note". Turner was one of only a few Australian directors to be invited to take part in this international poll.

Dallas Doll screened at Harvard University in 2024 with an introduction and post-screening discussion by queer film historian Jenni Olson. Dallas Doll is now in the Harvard Film Archive. Dallas Doll achieved over 432,000 views on the Internet Archive.

Dallas Doll and Celia screened at the Art Gallery of New South Wales in 2024 in a weekend retrospective of Turner's work, accompanied by Question and Answer sessions with Turner.

Irresistible was given a Blu-ray release on 4 September 2024 by Melbourne, Australia company Umbrella Entertainment. Turner and Executive Producer Sue Maslin AO provided a voice-over commentary for the Blu-ray. Irresistible was available to view on the Australian Broadcasting Corporation's iView platform in 2025 and 2026.

Hammers Over The Anvil screened on Australia's SBS television in January 2025.

In 2024 Flesh on Glass screened at the Capitol Theatre in Melbourne, Australia, as part of RMIT's Out of the Archive programme. Turner appeared in a panel on the night discussing Australian films of the 1970s. In April 2026 Flesh On Glass is available to view on YouTube as part of the Victorian College of the Arts Film and Television Digital Collection. It has achieved over 176,000 views, the second-highest of any film in the collection.

== Film themes and style ==
In interviews, Turner has spoken of the interplay between her personal life and career, noting how childhood memories of loss, friendships, family life and the world of the imagination have shaped her storytelling.

Turner's influence for Celia was her own childhood in Adelaide, South Australia, films such as Curse Of The Cat People and Carnival of Souls and historical research on the Bolte Government's rabbit muster in 1957.

The theme of "otherness" is central to Turner's work. Turner is a feminist filmmaker who cares deeply about depicting strong, three-dimensional females on screen,

Dallas Doll was inspired by Turner seeing how Americans are often received unquestioningly with open arms in Australia, and the film investigates Australia's cultural cringe. It also explores sexuality within a family, linking back to Turner's fascination with suburbia, and its potential dark side. FIlm scholar Tom O'Regan in his reflections on Australian cinema of the 1990s claims Dallas Doll carves out a singular contribution to cinema in this period: "Self-consciously affirmative, the film insists on unconventional choices. Women are agents not just victims of circumstances beyond their control." For O'Regan, Dallas Doll reiterates themes found in French post-modernist feminism (Monique Wiitig, Luce Irigaray) by creating a utopian space in which women define themselves and their sexuality for themselves rather than in relation to men. In this way, Turner's cinema outlines a different approach to feminist thinking than the contemporary work of Jane Campion or Gillian Armstrong.

Bathing Boxes continues Dallas Doll's exploration of sensuality and sexuality, and is set at a beach, as was Flesh on Glass – Turner's student graduation film which explores similar themes. Flesh on Glass also explores religion and spirituality. Irresistible further explores families, suburbia, love and trust, this time set against a background of stalking and gaslighting.

Hammers Over The Anvil, like Celia, is centred around a child. It is a coming-of-age drama based on the stories of literary author Alan Marshall who had polio. Turner traces the central character's determination to live an active life with his disability. A familiar theme in the film is family life, and also a forbidden relationship – in this case between Russell Crowe's character of horseman East and Charlotte Rampling, a married older woman in the small country town.

Turner's novel The Lost Swimmer continues Turner's exploration of family relationships, trust and loss, again with a strong, intelligent female protagonist. Out of the Ice, Turner's second novel, again deals with loss and motherhood, against a backdrop of the importance of nature and the environment.

== Selected filmography ==
- Celia (1989)
- Hammers Over the Anvil (1992)
- Turtle Beach (1992) - writer only
- Dallas Doll (1994)
- Irresistible (2006)
- Flesh on Glass (1981)
