= Young Lions =

Young Lions may refer to:

== Music, film, and print ==
- Young Lions (album), a 1990 album by Adrian Belew
- Young Lions (TV series), a 2002 Australian police drama
- Young Lions (book), a 2010 graphic novel by Blaise Larmee
- The Young Lions (novel), a 1948 novel by Irwin Shaw
- The Young Lions (film), a 1958 American film based upon the novel of the same name
- The Young Lions (album), a 1960 jazz recording

== Other ==
- Young Lions Competition, for young advertising professionals, part of the Cannes Lions International Festival of Creativity
- Young Lions FC, a Singapore under-23 football team
- Young lion, a professional wrestling term for a rookie wrestler
  - Professional wrestlers under development by New Japan Pro-Wrestling
    - Young Lion Cup, a professional wrestling tournament promoted by New Japan Pro-Wrestling

== See also ==
- Young Lions & Old Tigers, a 1995 studio album by American jazz pianist Dave Brubeck
- The Young Lion, a 2013 historical novel by Blanche d'Alpuget
