= Carolyn Bock =

Australian actress

Carolyn Bock is an Australian stage, film and television actress.

== Career ==
Bock is the co-founder of The Shift Theatre, which was founded in 2009. Bock for twelve years was the Associate Artistic Director of Rollercoaster Theatre, a theatre company that helps actors with disabilities. In 2012, Bock released the book The Girls in Grey. In 2023, Bock appeared in the film The Red Shoes. In 2024, Bock was named in the cast for the film Love, Tea & Epiphany. In 2025, Bock appeared in the play POTUS.

On 23 April 2026, Bock was named in the extended cast for Paramount+ series Dalliance.

== Filmography ==
Television appearances
Year	Title	Role	Notes
2026	Dalliance	Adele	TV series
2026	Last Seen	Lydia Boyd	TV series
2025	The Newsreader	Ann Bertrand	1 episode
2023	Almost Paradise	Cookie	1 episode
2023	Safe Home	Minister for Women	1 episode
2018-21	Wentworth	Detective Hydari	6 episodes
2021	La Brea	Government Official	1 episode
2018	Superwog	Mrs. Harwood	1 episode
2017	Offspring	Andrea Lloyde	1 episode
2011-16	Winners & Losers	Louise Wong	5 episodes
2016	Hunters	Willa Jackson	1 episode
2015	The Beautiful Lie	Doctor	1 episode
2014	INXS: Never Tear Us Apart	Jill Farriss	2 episodes
2014	The Doctor Blake Mysteries	Frances Trevorrow	1 episode
2012	Lowdown	PR Woman	1 episode
2000-11	Neighbours	Rachael Bailey / Peggy Newton	31 episodes
2009	Welcome to Cosmos	Commander Sagas	TV series
2007-09	City Homicide	Linda Wolfe	11 episodes
2007	Bastard Boys	Interview	TV series
2005	Holly's Heroes	Mayor Jenkins	5 episodes
2005	Last Man Standing	Nicole	1 episode
2005	The Secret Life of Us	Diana	2 episodes
2003	MDA	Clare Carter	1 episode
1999-03	Stingers	Zara / Claire	2 episodes
1995-03	Blue Heelers	Felicity Falcon-Price / Natalie Roberts / Judy / Jody	9 episodes
2002	Murder in Greenwich	Caroline Fuhrman	TV movie
2001	Horace and Tina	Kim Tate	26 episodes
1999	Silent Predators	Anita Young	TV movie
1998	Halifax f.p.	Pauline	1 episode
1997	State Coroner	Helen White	1 episode
1996	Ocean Girl	Kraya	1 episode
1995	Janus	TV Reporter	1 episode
1993	Stark	Sasha	1 episode
1993	Newlyweds	Emily	1 episode
1991	Chances	Rachel / Tracey	6 episodes

Film appearances
Year	Title	Role	Notes
2025	Love, Tea & Epiphany	Gini	
2023	The Red Shoes: Next Step	Miss Harlow	
2021	Some Happy Day	Ambulance Operator	film
2020	The Blood of God	Kirsty Benson	Short
2017	The Fox	Clare	Short
2015	Foetal Position	Harriet	
2013	Grandad	Carol	Short
2012	Sudden Night	The Woman	Short
2012	Fish & Chips	Jan	
2011	Vanished	Caterina Hill	
2011	Room for Two	Emily	
2006	Forged	Marla	
2006	Irresistible	Sophie's nurse	
2005	The Extra	Curtis' movie star	
2004	Josh Jarman	Attractive Theatre Actress	
2003	Max's Dreaming	Paula	
2000	Sensitive New Age Killer	Matt McKlean	
1999	Huntsman 5.1	Shana	
1998	Derwent Envy	Mum	Short
1996	Zone 39	Anne	
1994	Lucy Break	Hospitality Lady	
1992	The Surrogate	Jean	Short

== Theatre ==
Year	Title	Role	Notes	Ref
2026	Uncle Vanya	Maryia	Melbourne Theatre Co	
2025	POTUS	Harriet	Fortyfive Downstairs	
2023	Garage Girls		Three Birds Theatre	
2023	Prophet	Producer / Cast	Theatre Works	
2022	#NoExceptions		La Mama	
2018	Hallowed Ground	Mary	La Mama	
