= 1981 in Australian literature =

This article presents a list of the historical events and publications of Australian literature during 1981.

== Events ==
- Peter Carey won the 1981 Miles Franklin Award for Bliss

== Major publications ==
=== Literary novels ===
- Peter Carey — Bliss
- Blanche d'Alpuget — Turtle Beach
- Sumner Locke Elliott — Signs of Life
- David Foster — Moonlite
- Miles Franklin — On Dearborn Street
- David Ireland — City of Women
- Elizabeth Jolley — The Newspaper of Claremont Street
- David Malouf — Child's Play
- Colleen McCullough — An Indecent Obsession
- Morris West — The Clowns of God

=== Crime and mystery ===
- Marshall Browne — Dragon Strike
- Peter Corris — White Meat

=== Science fiction and fantasy ===
- John Brosnan — Skyship
- A. Bertram Chandler — The Anarch Lords
- David Lake — The Man Who Loved Morlocks
- Keith Taylor — Bard
- George Turner — Vaneglory

=== Children's and young adult fiction ===
- Jan Ormerod — Sunshine
- Ruth Park — The Muddle-Headed Wombat is Very Bad
- Eleanor Spence – The Seventh Pebble
- Colin Thiele — The Valley Between

=== Poetry ===
- Alan Gould — Astral Sea
- Gwen Harwood — The Lion's Bride
- Geoffrey Lehmann — Nero's Poems: Translations of the Public and Private Poems of the Emperor Nero

=== Drama ===
- Louis Nowra
  - Inside The Island
  - The Precious Woman

=== Non-fiction ===
- Albert Facey — A Fortunate Life
- Henry Reynolds — The Other Side of the Frontier
- Eric Charles Rolls — A Million Wild Acres
- Gavin Souter — A Company of Heralds
- Patrick White — Flaws in the Glass

== Awards and honours ==
=== Companion of the Order of Australia (AC) ===
- A. D. Hope

=== Member of the Order of Australia (AM) ===
- Dymphna Cusack
- Beatrice Deloitte Davis
- David Ireland
- Jack Lindsay
- Alan Marshall
- Stephen Murray-Smith
- Leslie Rees
- Ivan Southall
- Joan Woodberry

=== Medal of the Order of Australia (OAM) ===
- Walter W. Stone

=== Lifetime achievement award ===
Award	Author
Christopher Brennan Award	Not awarded
Patrick White Award	Dal Stivens

=== Literary ===
Award	Author	Title	Publisher
The Age Book of the Year Award	Eric Charles Rolls	A Million Wild Acres	Nelson
ALS Gold Medal	Not awarded		
Colin Roderick Award	Gavin Souter	A Company of Heralds	Melbourne University Press

=== Fiction ===
Award	Author	Title	Publisher
The Age Book of the Year Award	Blanche d'Alpuget	Turtle Beach	Penguin
The Australian/Vogel Literary Award	Chris Matthews	Al Jazzar	Allen & Unwin
The Australian/Vogel Literary Award	Tim Winton	An Open Swimmer	Allen & Unwin
Miles Franklin Award	Peter Carey	Bliss	Faber and Faber
New South Wales Premier's Literary Awards	Jessica Anderson	The Impersonators	Macmillan

=== Children and Young Adult ===
Award	Category	Author	Title	Publisher
Children's Book of the Year Award	Older Readers	Ruth Park	Playing Beatie Bow	Nelson Books
Children's Book of the Year Award	Picture Book	Not awarded		
New South Wales Premier's Literary Awards	Children's Book Award	Ruth Park and Deborah Niland	When the Wind Changed	William Collins
New South Wales Premier's Literary Awards	Special Children's Book Award	Eleanor Spence	The Seventh Pebble	Oxford University Press

=== Science fiction and fantasy ===
Award	Category	Author	Title	Publisher
Australian SF Achievement Award	Best Australian Science Fiction	Damien Broderick	The Dreaming Dragons	Norstrilia Press

=== Poetry ===
Award	Author	Title	Publisher
Anne Elder Award	Gig Ryan	The Division of Anger	Transit Press
Anne Elder Award	Jenny Boult	The Hotel Anonymous	Bent Enterprises
Grace Leven Prize for Poetry	Geoffrey Lehmann	Nero's Poems: Translations of the Public and Private; Poems of the Emperor Nero	Angus & Robertson
New South Wales Premier's Literary Awards	Alan Gould	Astral Sea	Angus & Robertson

=== Non-fiction ===
Award	Author	Title	Publisher
The Age Book of the Year Award	Eric Charles Rolls	A Million Wild Acres	Nelson
New South Wales Premier's Literary Awards	A. B. Facey	A Fortunate Life	Manuscript version

== Births ==
A list, ordered by date of birth (and, if the date is either unspecified or repeated, ordered alphabetically by surname) of births in 1981 of Australian literary figures, authors of written works or literature-related individuals follows, including year of death.

- 7 April — Lili Wilkinson, author of young adult fiction

Unknown date

- Zana Fraillon, novelist for children and young adults
- Alice Pung, novelist and memoir writer, editor and lawyer

== Deaths ==
A list, ordered by date of death (and, if the date is either unspecified or repeated, ordered alphabetically by surname) of deaths in 1981 of Australian literary figures, authors of written works or literature-related individuals follows, including year of birth.

- 14 January — John O'Grady, writer, best known as Nino Culotta, author of They're a Weird Mob (born 1907)
- 29 March — Clive Sansom, poet and playwright (born 1910)
- 19 April — Louis Kaye, novelist and short story writer (born 1901)
- 29 April — Leonard Mann, poet and novelist (born 1895)
- 29 August — Wal Stone, book publisher, collector and supporter of Australian literature (born 1910)
- 19 October — Dymphna Cusack, novelist and playwright (born 1902)

Unknown date

- Edith Mary England, novelist and poet (born 1899)
- Ada Verdun Howell, author and poet (born 1902)

== See also ==
- 1981 in Australia
- 1981 in literature
- 1981 in poetry
- List of years in literature
- List of years in Australian literature
