= Alethea McGrath =

Australian actress and comedian (1920–2016)

- McGrath as Jocasta Nu in Star Wars: Episode II – Attack of the Clones.
- Born: Alethca Ada Murphy; 1 June 1920; Brisbane, Australia
- Died: 9 February 2016 (aged 95); Melbourne, Australia
- Occupations: Actress; comedian; voice artist; lecturer
- Years active: 1941–2010

Alethea Ada McGrath (1 June 1920 – 9 February 2016) was an Australian actress and comedian. She is best known for her role as Jedi Master Jocasta Nu in Star Wars: Episode II – Attack of the Clones.

== Early and personal life ==
Born Alethca Ada Murphy, the youngest daughter of Philip Austin Murphy (born in 1870 at Providence, Rhode Island, United States, died in 1943 at Lindum, Queensland, Australia and English-born mother Rosa Alice Allum (1886–1958).

She married Edward William McGrath (1929–2007).

== Career ==
Initially billed as Alethea Murphy in her two appearances in Homicide in 1964 and 1966. Her roles on television included Dot Farrar in Prisoner and three different roles in Neighbours: Miss Logan in 1985, Mary Crombie in 1989 and 1991, and Lily Madigan in 1998. In the 2000s, she played Mrs. Lillie in Romulus, My Father (2007) and Miss Taylor in Knowing (2009).

Before concentrating on acting professionally, McGrath taught drama at Methodist Ladies College, Kew, Melbourne.

== Death ==
She died in a hospital near Melbourne, Australia on 9 February 2016, aged 95.

== Filmography ==
=== Film ===
Year	Title	Role	Notes
1988	The Big Hurt	Mrs. Trent	
1988	Backstage	Old Lady #2 - Theatre	
1993	Hammers Over the Anvil	Mrs. Bilson	
1994	That Eye, the Sky	Grammar Flack	
1994	Dallas Doll	Aunt Mary	
1997	Alien Visitor	Grandmother	
1998	Dead Letter Office	Gardening Mother	
2000	Muggers	Older Woman	
2000	Sensitive New-Age Killer	Evicted Guest	
2002	Star Wars: Episode II – Attack of the Clones	Madame Jocasta Nu	
2003	Inspector Gadget 2	Mrs. Quimby	Direct-to-video
2003	Take Away	Mrs. McLeod	
2004	Dreams for Life	Lucy	
2006	Irresistible	Maggie	
2007	Desolation Angel	Mrs. Reeves	Short film
2007	Romulus, My Father	Mrs. Lillie	
2007	The Money Shot	Nanna	
2009	Knowing	Miss Taylor (2009)	(final film role)

=== Television ===
Year	Title	Role	Notes
1964, 1966	Homicide	Louise White/Irene Hunter	2 episodes
1984	Prisoner: Cell Block H	Dot Farrar	25 episodes
1984	Matthew and Son	Minnie Timmins	TV movie
1985	The Dunera Boys	English landlady	TV movie
1985, 1989, 1991, 1998	Neighbours	Miss Logan, Mary Crombie, Lily Madigan	20 episodes
1985	Emerging	Food Lady	TV movie
1989	This Man... This Woman	Sheila	mini-series
1989	Pugwall	Old Worm	2 episodes
1990	The Flying Doctors	Mrs. Harrington	Episode: "Valentine's Day"
1994	Law of the Land	Sarah Pearcedale	2 episodes
1994	Newlyweds	Aunty Rose	Episode: "The Annunciation"
1994–1995, 2001–2002, 2005–2006	Blue Heelers	Alice Foster, Mrs. Carmichael, Lily Majors	6 episodes
1994	A Country Practice	Aunty Vera	Episode: "Where's Wally"
1996	English: Have a Go		
2000	Dogwoman: Dead Dog Walking	Pam Davis	TV movie
2000-2002	Something in the Air	Alice	11 episodes
2001	The Lost World	Old Ana	Episode: "The Source"
2002	Kath & Kim	Melissa	Episode: "Old"
2004	Fergus McPhail	Mrs. Carmody	Episode: "Goosebumps"
2005	Scooter: Secret Agent	Emily Griffin	Episode: "Operation: Supernatural"
2006	Nightmares & Dreamscapes: From the Stories of Stephen King	Elderly Mary	mini-series
2007	Curtin	Mrs. Needham	TV movie
2008	City Homicide	Daphne Hurley	Episode: "Spoils of War"

=== Video games ===
Year	Title	Role	Notes
2005	Star Wars Episode III: Revenge of the Sith	Madame Jocasta Nu	
