= Celia (1989 film) =

- Promotional advertisement
- Directed by: Ann Turner
- Written by: Ann Turner
- Produced by: Gordon Glenn; Timothy White
- Starring: Rebecca Smart; Nicholas Eadie; Victoria Longley; Mary-Anne Fahey
- Cinematography: Geoffrey Simpson
- Edited by: Ken Sallows
- Music by: Chris Neal
- Production company: Seon Film Productions
- Distributed by: Hoyts Distribution
- Release dates: 3 March 1989 (Melbourne); 19 March 1990 (New York City)
- Running time: 103 minutes
- Country: Australia
- Languages: English; Japanese
- Budget: A$1.4 million

Celia (also known as Celia: Child of Terror) is a 1989 Australian horror drama film written and directed by Ann Turner, and starring Rebecca Smart, Nicholas Eadie, Victoria Longley, and Mary-Anne Fahey. Set in 1957, the film centres on an imaginative young girl growing up on the outskirts of Melbourne during the Red Scare, whose fantastical view of the world around her brings about grim results.

Released in Australia in 1989 and the United States in 1990, Celia received praise from critics for its performances, particularly that of Smart.

== Plot ==
In 1957 Box Hill, Australia, imaginative eight-year-old Celia Carmichael is devastated by her grandmother's death. After the funeral, Celia envisions a monstrous blue hand of a Hobyah reaching into her bedroom window. Upon hearing Celia scream, her mother Pat enters to comfort her. Pat takes Celia to the backyard where the screeching is revealed to be a possum.

The following day, Celia meets her new next-door neighbours, Alice and Evan Tanner, and their children, Meryl, Karl, and Steve. On Celia's birthday, she is disappointed to receive a bicycle instead of a pet rabbit; her father, Ray, assures her rabbits are vermin. Later, at mass, the priest delivers a sermon deriding the Australian Peace Council, claiming it is a communist front. Meanwhile, Celia finds comfort in visions of her grandmother, particularly when being bullied at school by her cousin, Stephanie. While Celia plays with the Tanners in a rock quarry one day, Stephanie and her brothers steal a wooden Japanese mask belonging to Celia's grandmother, and chase Celia.

Celia's father, Ray, becomes angered when he finds that the Tanners are members of the Communist Party of Australia, causing tension between the families. He forbids Celia from visiting the Tanner home, and, to appease her, buys her a pet rabbit, which she names Murgatroyd. When Celia is found speaking to the Tanner children again, her father grounds her for a week, and informs his brother Burke—the local sergeant, and Stephanie's father—of the Tanners' communist beliefs. Celia has a disturbing nightmare in which her grandmother scratches at her window, followed by a gruesome Hobyah.

One night, Celia and the Tanner children sneak to the rock quarry, where they make effigies of Burke as well as Stephanie and Ray. In a ritual around a fire, the children stab the effigies with needles before throwing two of them into Stephanie's bedroom window. Celia places the effigy of her father in a cupboard, and when he discovers it, he beats her with a belt. After Evan loses his job due to Ray's disclosure of his communist beliefs, Celia and the Tanner children return to the quarry and burn the effigy of Ray, wishing death upon him. They are ambushed by Stephanie and her friends, who lock them in a shack before branding Murgatroyd with a hot poker.

Celia and the Tanner children retaliate by throwing bags of flour onto Stephanie and her brothers during church mass. Later, the Tanners relocate to Sydney so Evan can find new employment. Burke later arrives at the Carmichael home to confiscate Murgatroyd, as the Victorian Government has deemed rabbits an invasive species and is banning them from being kept as pets. After several unsuccessful attempts, Burke finally manages to abscond with Murgatroyd, who is taken to the local zoo. Celia begins hallucinating, imagining her uncle Burke as an evil Hobyah creature. At school, Celia defaces a newspaper photograph of Victorian premier Henry Bolte, turning him into a Hobyah.

After a series of petitions, the government finally agrees to allow individuals to keep pet rabbits with permits. Celia and numerous other families visit the zoo to reclaim their rabbits, but Celia and her friend Heather find their rabbits both dead. Later, Celia and Heather are left in the care of Burke while Celia's parents go to play tennis. Celia again hallucinates, imagining Burke as a Hobyah, and shoots him to death with her father's shotgun. In a panic, the girls disarray the house and throw some of Pat's jewelry in a stream, posing the scene to appear as a robbery-murder. The girls chain Burke's pet dog to a tree, and stay at the quarry until Celia's parents return home and find Burke's body.

Celia's mother become suspicious when they find Burke's dog, as well as noticing a bruise on Celia's chest shaped like the end of a shotgun. She chooses to hide these from the police and Celia's father. Later, Celia and Heather play at the quarry with Stephanie and her gang of friends, staging a mock execution for Burke's murder. Celia acts as judge, sentencing Heather to death by hanging. Heather is hanged and appears lifeless for a moment, but then falls to the ground, revealing it to be only a prank.

== Cast ==
- Rebecca Smart as Celia Carmichael
- Nicholas Eadie as Ray Carmichael
- Victoria Longley as Alice Tanner
- Mary-Anne Fahey as Pat Carmichael
- Margaret Ricketts as Grandmother
- Alexander Hutchinson as Steve Tanner
- Adrian Mitchell as Karl Tanner
- Callie Gray as Meryl Tanner
- Martin Sharman as Evan Tanner
- Clair Couttie as Heather Goldman
- Alex Menglet as Mr. Goldman
- Amelia Frid as Stephanie Burke
- William Zappa as Sergeant John Burke
- Feon Keane as Soapy Burke
- Louise Le Nay as Debbie Burke

== Production ==
Ann Turner was a graduate of Swinburne, who had worked at Film Victoria and the Australian Film Commission as a consultant. She was inspired to write the film by an article in the newspaper about a rabbit muster in the 1950s organised by the Victorian government under premier Henry Bolte.

The script was written in 1984, when it won the AWGIE for Best Unproduced Screenplay.

The film was co-produced by Gordon Glenn and Timothy White.

== Release ==
Celia opened at the 1989 Créteil International Women's Film Festival in France, where it won the Grand Prix for best film.

It was released in Melbourne on 3 March 1989 as part of the "Women In Focus" film festival held by the Australian Film Commission.

In the United States, it opened in New York City on 19 March 1990, presented by the Film Society of Lincoln Center and the Department of Film of the Museum of Modern Art's New Directors/New Films series.

== Reception ==
=== Critical response ===
Jonathan Rosenbaum from Chicago Reader praised Smart's performance, and Turner's passion for the project, while stating that the film's storytelling "isn't as streamlined as one might wish". Janet Maslin of The New York Times offered similar praise towards Smart's performance, as well as Turner's slow building of tension. Maslin however, criticised the last third as "going too far".

Tom Hutchinson of The Mail ranked the film favourably alongside other coming-of-age films such as François Truffaut's The 400 Blows (1959) and Carol Reed's The Fallen Idol (1948). Brett Gallman from Oh the Horror gave the film a positive review, writing, "Certainly a unique experience, Celia is that rare film that captures childhood anxiety and highlights its very literal horrors by subtly accentuating its more figurative ones."

In a retrospective, journalist and film critic Kim Newman lauded the film as "one of the great movies about the terrors, wonders and strangeness of childhood, and a still-undervalued classic of Australian cinema."

Chris Neilson from DVD Talk awarded the film 4 out of 5 stars, praising the film's acting, and called it "a low-budget forerunner of Guillermo del Toro's Pan's Labyrinth, capturing the shift from childhood fantasy to stark adult reality".

== Home media ==
Celia was released on VHS in the United States by Trylon Video in December 1989 as Celia: Child of Terror. It was later issued on DVD by Second Run on 30 March 2009, and subsequently released on DVD by Scorpion Releasing on 26 February 2013. In Australia, Celia was released on DVD by Umbrella Entertainment in 2018 as a double set with the 1988 Australian film The Tale of Ruby Rose.

In December 2021, Celia was released on Blu-ray by Severin Films as part of the "All the Haunts Be Ours" box set, a compendium of international folk horror films.

== See also ==
- Cinema of Australia
- Cinema of Japan
