= The Alien Years =

- Genre: Historical drama
- Screenplay by: Peter Yeldham
- Directed by: Donald Crombie
- Starring: Victoria Longley; Christoph Waltz; John Hargreaves
- Narrated by: Gavin Mason
- Theme music composer: Bruce Smeaton
- Country of origin: Australia
- Original language: English
- No. of episodes: 6

Production
- Producers: Ray Alchin; Alan Burke; Geoffrey Daniels; Sandra Levy
- Cinematography: Peter Hendry
- Editor: Tom Kavanagh
- Running time: 60 mins
- Budget: $5.8 million.

Original release
- Network: Australian Broadcasting Corporation
- Release: 19 April 1988 – 1988

The Alien Years is a three-part miniseries that first aired on the Australian Broadcasting Corporation on 19 April 1988. It was directed by Donald Crombie and written by Peter Yeldham. It stars Victoria Longley, John Hargreaves, Christoph Waltz. Yeldham later adapted his screenplay into a novel of the same name.

== Plot ==
Elizabeth Parsons (Victoria Longley) is the daughter of an important figure in the Australian government. She falls for and ultimately marries Stefan (Christoph Waltz), a German national. They move to South Australia to run a vineyard but their peace is disturbed by the outbreak of the First World War. The government orders that all German nationals living in Australia must be imprisoned.

== Cast ==
- Victoria Longley as Elizabeth Parsons
- Christoph Waltz as Stefan Mueller
- John Hargreaves as William
- Jane Harders as Edith
- Kim Krejus as Martha
- Tom Jennings as Harry
- Nick Tate as North
- Jonathan Sweet as McVeigh

== Production ==
The series took three months to produce and was partly shot in Hahndorf in the Adelaide Hills and Bethany in the Barossa Valley.
