= Turtle Beach (novel) =

1981 novel by Australian writer Blanche d'Alpuget

- Author: Blanche d'Alpuget
- Language: English
- Genre: Fiction
- Publisher: Penguin
- Publication date: 1981
- Publication place: Australia
- Media type: Print
- Pages: 286 pp.
- ISBN: 0140057846
- Preceded by: Monkeys in the Dark
- Followed by: Robert J. Hawke : A Biography

Turtle Beach (1981) is a novel by Australian writer Blanche d'Alpuget. It was originally published by Penguin in Australia in 1981.

== Synopsis ==
Set in 1979 the novel follows an Australian journalist who is covering the arrival in Malaysia of ethnic Chinese fleeing oppression in post-war Vietnam.

== Critical reception ==
Writing in The Canberra Times, Alison Broinowski noted: "The Australian pilgrimage into Asia is what both of Blanche d'Alpuget's novels are about. In Turtle Beach, however, she goes further, into an exploration of the personality of individual Asians as well. Her Indian academic Kanan and her French-Vietnamese Minou are developed in more depth than most of her Australians. The clashes of culture are more effective because she gives both sides."

== Publication history ==
After its original publication in 1981 in Australia by publisher Penguin the novel was later published as follows:

- Simon and Schuster, USA, 1981
- Penguin, Australia, 1991

The novel was also translated into French in 1983, and Japanese in 1992.

== Awards ==
- Turtle Beach won The Age Book of the Year Award for Imaginative Writing in 1981

== Film adaptation ==
The novel was adapted as a feature film of the same name in 1992 featuring Greta Scacchi and Jack Thompson. The film was directed by Stephen Wallace from a screenplay by Ann Turner.

== See also ==
- 1981 in Australian literature
