= Talk (film) =

- Directed by: Susan Lambert
- Written by: Jan Cornall
- Produced by: Megan McMurchy
- Starring: Victoria Longley; Angie Milliken; Richard Roxburgh; John Jarratt
- Release date: 1994
- Running time: 87 minutes
- Country: Australia
- Language: English

Talk is a 1994 Australian film directed by Susan Lambert and starring Victoria Longley and Angie Milliken. The film tells the story of two close friends living in Sydney, Stephanie Ness and Julia Strong, who collaborate on graphic novels together. They spend a 24-hour period discussing their situations in life, while a dual narrative takes the viewer into the world of their current graphic novel in progress.

== Plot summary ==
The film centres on Stephanie (Angie Milliken) and Julia (Victoria Longley), two close friends who collaborate on writing & illustrating graphic novels together. As the film begins, Stephanie arrives home to her Neutral Bay apartment in Sydney after a trip to Tokyo and tells Julia about a recent near-miss sexual experience with a man she hoped would impregnate her. Jack (Richard Roxburgh), a tradesman visiting the apartment to fix Stephanie's TV, eavesdrops on the conversation with great interest. He ends up taking the TV away to repair at his shop.

Stephanie is a single woman living a carefree lifestyle but is keen to have a baby and finds this difficult, especially in the era of HIV/AIDS. Julia lives in the country with her husband, Mac (John Jarratt), and daughter, Kelly. Where her life is seemingly more stable than Stephanie's, she is coming to terms with the fact that Mac is having an affair with an unknown woman.

Over a 24-hour period, the two women discuss their contrasting problems at length in a variety of Sydney settings. Stephanie begins to wonder if she actually wants a relationship, rather than a baby. She mentions a time in which she lost an important handbag, but coped with the experience by deciding to see herself as "free of" it. As the two women chat through their feelings, a nameless woman credited only as "The Girl" (Jacqueline McKenzie) appears to be following them.

Simultaneous to this narrative, and shot in a completely different style, the film enters the world of a cyberpunk neo-noir graphic novel that Stephanie and Julia are working on. This has an ambiguous narrative that seems to parallel events and people in Julia and Stephanie's lives, but the link between the two is never made entirely clear.

While on a train with Stephanie, Julia sees The Girl again and suddenly realises that she is the same woman who is having an affair with Mac, and they have been followed so she can "get a look at the wife." It is not fully explained whether Julia is correct in this assumption. Julia gets off the train at Newtown and emotionally confronts The Girl about the consequences of her actions, although The Girl does not speak. She then makes two phone calls from pay phones: one to Mac to angrily confront him, and one to Kelly to tell her that she and Mac will not be living together anymore. Exhausted from these events, Julia breaks down crying against the wall in Camperdown Memorial Rest Park.

Meanwhile, Stephanie goes to pick up the TV from Jack, who mentions that he too would like to have a baby but is finding it difficult to find a partner with whom to do so. The two have passionate sex on Jack's workshop floor - and use a condom.

Having both had intense emotional experiences, Julia and Stephanie meet again to resume work. They enter Stephanie's apartment to find that it has been ransacked, with her possessions now in disarray and most of the furniture missing. Stephanie throws her keys on the floor in frustration and she and Julia embrace, but both seem flabbergasted or even amused by the situation. Neither speak a word out loud, nor react in a particularly emotional way. Julia opens a bottle of champagne for them to share. They both sit on the floor and begin to go through the scattered pages of their graphic novel in progress. Jack then arrives at the apartment and says "Hi." The three exchange knowing looks.

== Cast ==
- Victoria Longley as Julia Strong
- Angie Milliken as Stephanie Ness
- Richard Roxburgh as Jack
- John Jarratt as Mac
- Jacqueline McKenzie as The Girl

== Production ==
The film was shot from 1 March to 2 April 1993.

== Reception ==
The LA Times's Kevin Thomas said "Susan Lambert’s ingenious and affecting Talk is a little gem of a movie, a witty and effervescent bittersweet comedy, shot through with humor and pain, that swiftly captures your attention and then involves your emotions as it gradually acquires depth." Caryn James wrote in the New York Times "Still, Susan Lambert, the director, is innovative and daring when she needs to be, and in command of the ordinary details when that is called for, too. Angie Milliken as Stephanie and Victoria Longley as Julia capture the strengths and confusion of women in their 30's who mistakenly think they might want to trade lives."

Writing for Variety, David Stratton stated "Susan Lambert’s first feature, after a number of interesting shorts and medium-length films, is a mixture of reality and fantasy that cogently explores the lives of two thirtysomething women friends during a period of less than 24 hours. The reality works much better than the fantasy, but the net result is positive, and this low-budgeter, which is already sparking fest interest, starting with Seattle, could have a modestly successful arthouse life."

Stratton and Margaret Pomeranz also reviewed it on The Movie Show. giving it three and three-and-a-half stars respectively. Both also expressed their surprise that the film had been rated R 18+ in Australia, feeling this was excessive and did not align with the film's content.

== Awards ==
- 1994 AFI Awards – Best Performance by an Actress in a Leading Role – Victoria Longley (nominated)
