= Horace and Tina =

- Created by: Jonathan M. Shiff
- Developed by: Robert Greenberg
- Starring: Jasmine Ellis; Jordan White; Matthew Parkinson; Carolyn Bock; David Sacher; Terry Norris; Hannah Greenwood; Carl Lennie
- Voices of: Jackie Kelleher; Frank Gallacher
- Composer: Brett Rosenberg
- Country of origin: Australia
- Original language: English
- No. of seasons: 1
- No. of episodes: 26

Production
- Executive producer: Jonathan M. Shiff
- Producers: Ann Darrouzet; Jonathan M. Shiff
- Cinematography: László Baranyai
- Editors: Philip Watts; Cindy Clarkson; Anne Carter
- Running time: 30 minutes
- Production companies: Australian Film Finance Corporation; Jonathan M. Shiff Productions; Film Victoria; Network Ten Australia

Original release
- Network: Network Ten
- Release: 4 May – 25 October 2001

Horace & Tina is an Australian live-action puppet comedy drama children's television series that first screened on Network Ten in 2001. The series was produced by Jonathan M. Shiff Productions. The series mixes animatronic characters (Horace & Tina) with live action drama.

== Plot ==
Horace is a short, grumpy, 200-year-old man who is the world's greatest mischief maker. His elder sister, Tina, is a 271-year-old incurable romantic who loves to meddle and give advice. Lauren Parker discovers she is the only person who can see Horace and Tina and has to keep their existence a secret from her family and friends without them thinking she's going crazy.

== Cast ==
- Jasmine Ellis as Lauren Parker
- Jordan White as Max Tate
- Matthew Parkinson as Steve Tate
- Carolyn Bock as Kimberly Tate
- Jackie Kelleher as the voice of Tina
- Frank Gallacher as the voice of Horace
- David Sacher as Lachlan Watson
- Terry Norris as Ern Watson
- Hannah Greenwood as Annabel Delaney
- Carl Lennie as TJ Knox
- Isabella Dunwill
- Greg Stone as Mr Birdwood

=== Recurring ===
- Jeremy Stanford as D.I. Clifford Knox
- Sean Scully as Mr Reid

== Episodes ==
No.	Title	Directed by	Written by	Original release date
1	"Arrivals"	Michael Carson	Helen MacWhirter and David Phillips	4 May 2001
2	"Settling In"	Michael Carson	David Phillips	11 May 2001
3	"Friends"	Richard Jasek	David Phillips	18 May 2001
4	"Playing Dumb"	Richard Jasek	Robert Greenberg	25 May 2001
5	"Seeing Things"	Mandy Smith	Robert Greenberg	1 June 2001
6	"Coming Together"	Mandy Smith	Peter Kinloch	8 June 2001
7	"Party to the Max"	Mandy Smith	Peter Kinloch	15 June 2001
8	"Animal Acts"	Mandy Smith	Helen MacWhirter	22 June 2001
9	"Squirm"	Michael Carson	Helen MacWhirter	29 June 2001
10	"Nelf Rot"	Mandy Smith	David Phillips	6 July 2001
11	"Stagefright"	Richard Jasek	David Phillips	13 July 2001
12	"Dear Diary"	Michael Carson	Sue Hore	20 July 2001
13	"Crunch Time"	Mandy Smith	Sue Hore	27 July 2001
14	"School Camp"	Richard Jasek	Michael Joshua	3 August 2001
15	"A Bad Influence"	Mandy Smith	Marieke Hardy	10 August 2001
16	"Nelf Day"	Mandy Smith	David Hannam	17 August 2001
17	"The Cover Up"	Richard Jasek	David Hannam	24 August 2001
18	"Tina & Ern"	David Cameron	John Coulter	31 August 2001
19	"Problem Student"	Richard Jasek	John Coulter	7 September 2001
20	"Nowhere to Hide"	Richard Jasek	Jutta Goetze	14 September 2001
21	"Abracadabra"	Richard Jasek	Jutta Goetze	21 September 2001
22	"Dancing Partner"	David Phillips	David Phillips	28 September 2001
23	"The Great Train Robbery"	David Cameron	David Phillips	4 October 2001
24	"Best Friend"	David Cameron	Kris Mrksa	11 October 2001
25	"Number One Again"	Richard Jasek	Jutta Goetze	18 October 2001
26	"Goodbye"	David Cameron	Jutta Goetze	25 October 2001
