= Hammers Over the Anvil =

1993 Australian film by Ann Turner

- DVD cover
- Directed by: Ann Turner
- Written by: Peter Hepworth; Ann Turner
- Based on: Alan Marshall
- Produced by: Ben Gannon
- Starring: Charlotte Rampling; Russell Crowe
- Cinematography: James Bartle
- Edited by: Ken Sallows
- Music by: Not Drowning, Waving
- Production company: Australian Film Finance Corporation
- Distributed by: Roadshow Entertainment
- Release dates: 19 February 1993 (Germany); 22 July 1994 (Australia)
- Running time: 97 minutes
- Country: Australia
- Language: English
- Budget: A$4 million

Hammers Over the Anvil is a 1993 Australian biographical romantic drama film starring Russell Crowe and directed by Ann Turner, who also co-wrote with Peter Hepworth. The film is based on the novel of the same name by Alan Marshall. The original music score is composed by Not Drowning, Waving.

== Plot ==
Based on the novel of the same name by Alan Marshall, the film is set in the early 1900s in a small town in the Western District of Victoria, centering around a young Alan Marshall and the people in his town. Crippled by polio, Alan tries to make sense of his place in a world where a man's physical prowess gains the admiration of women and the envy of his peers, as exemplified by the horsebreaker East Driscoll, portrayed by Russell Crowe. Charlotte Rampling also stars as an English lady, Grace McAlister, who has moved to the area with her well-to-do but older and ineffectual husband. Marshall longs for the affection of the mature and spirited woman but she lusts after the virile horsebreaker. Marshall longs to ride a horse, which he can never achieve, but is a talented writer, while Driscoll is ashamed of his lack of education and social graces. The tables are turned when Marshall comes across his rival, who has been thrown from his horse and is near death. He must seek help urgently, which he achieves, though at great pain to himself.

== Cast ==
- Charlotte Rampling as Grace McAlister
- Russell Crowe as East Driscoll
- Alexander Outhred as Alan Marshall
- Frankie J. Holden as 'Bushman' Marshall
- Amanda Douge as Nellie Bolster
- Frank Gallacher as Mr. Thomas (a preacher)
- John Lee as Charles McAlister
- Daphne Grey as Mrs. Herbert
- Alethea McGrath as Mrs. Alison
- Wayne Pygram as Snarley Burns
- Syd Brisbane as Duke

== Production ==
The project had been around for a number of years. The script was originally written by Peter Hepworth then re-written by Ann Turner.

It is set and was filmed in South Australia's wine district in seven weeks from 11 October to 29 November 1991.

== See also ==
- Cinema of Australia
- Russell Crowe filmography
- South Australian Film Corporation
