= The Coast Town Kids =

- Directed by: Peter Maxwell
- Starring: John Wood; Frank Gallacher; Alan Hopgood
- Country of origin: Australia
- Original language: English

Production
- Producer: Tom Broadbridge
- Running time: 80 mins
- Production company: Andromeda Productions

Original release
- Release: 1980

The Coast Town Kids is a 1980 Australian TV movie. It was the pilot for a TV series.

== Cast ==
- John Woods as Tom Wilde
- Frank Gallacher as Len Wolding
- Alan Hopgood as Mick James
- Peter Felmingham as Fred Farrell
- Robert Korosy as Peter Martin
- Sally Wilde as Missy Martin
- Justin Stanford as Skinny
