= Requiem (TV series) =

Welsh TV miniseries

- Genre: Supernatural; Thriller
- Written by: Kris Mrksa; Blake Ayshford
- Directed by: Mahalia Belo
- Starring: Lydia Wilson; Joel Fry; James Frecheville; Sian Reese-Williams; Brendan Coyle; Claire Rushbrook; Richard Harrington; Joanna Scanlan; Clare Calbraith; Tara Fitzgerald; Dyfan Dwyfor; Sam Hazeldine; Simon Kunz
- Music by: Dominik Scherrer; Natasha Khan
- Country of origin: United Kingdom
- Original language: English
- No. of series: 1
- No. of episodes: 6

Production
- Executive producers: Willow Grylls; Elaine Pyke; Charlie Pattinson; Polly Hill
- Producer: Susan Breen
- Running time: 60 minutes
- Production companies: New Pictures; BBC

Original release
- Network: BBC One
- Release: 2 February – 16 March 2018

Requiem is a six-part British television drama serial, written and created by Kris Mrksa and directed by Mahalia Belo. It is a co-production between New Pictures for the BBC and Netflix. It first broadcast on BBC One on 2 February 2018, with all six episodes being released via BBC iPlayer on the same day. It became available internationally on Netflix from 23 March 2018, and a DVD was released via Acorn Media on 19 March 2018.

The series encompasses elements of both the supernatural and thriller genres. It stars Lydia Wilson as Matilda Grey, an accomplished cellist whose life is turned upside down following her mother's suicide, which raises a number of questions about her identity and events in her past. Joel Fry stars as her best friend and fellow musician Harlan "Hal" Fine. James Frecheville, Sian Reese-Williams, Brendan Coyle, Claire Rushbrook, and Richard Harrington are also credited as principal members of the cast.

Filming took place in Wales from June 2017 and supported by funding from the Welsh Government. It was produced by New Pictures.

== Cast ==
=== Main ===
- Lydia Wilson as Matilda Grey; an award-winning cellist
- Joel Fry as Harlan "Hal" Fine; Matilda's best friend and fellow musician
- James Frecheville as Nick Dean; distant relative of the late Ewan Dean who inherits Dean House
- Sian Reese-Williams as Trudy Franken; Carys' childhood friend who was with her on the day she disappeared
- Brendan Coyle as Stephen Kendrick; a former Detective Inspector who investigated Carys' disappearance
- Claire Rushbrook as Rose Morgan; Carys' birth mother
- Richard Harrington as Aron Morgan; Rose's second husband
- Joanna Scanlan as Janice Gray; Maltida's mother who unexpectedly takes her own life
- Clare Calbraith as PC Graves; a local police constable who investigates the death of Ewan Dean
- Tara Fitzgerald as Sylvia Walsh; a local antiques dealer with an interest in the supernatural
- Dyfan Dwyfor as Ed Fenton; a local handyman with a mysterious connection to Aron Morgan
- Sam Hazeldine as Sean Howell; Carys' father who went missing in the years after her disappearance
- Simon Kunz as Lloyd Satlow; solicitor working on behalf of the Dean family
- Pippa Haywood as Verity Satlow; local psychiatrist

=== Recurring ===
- Charles Dale as Royce Evans; a local farmer
- Brochan Evans as David Morgan; Rose and Aron's son
- Darren Evans as PC Ian Shortly; PC Graves' partner
- Ifan Huw Dafydd as Harry Franken; landlord of the local pub
- Emmie Thompson as Carys Howell; daughter of Rose and Sean
- Oliver Lansley as Carl
- Jane Thorne as Meredith Dean; Nick's estranged aunt and initial inheritor of Dean House
- Anastasia Hille as Laura; a local woman who claims to have visions of Carys
- Bella Ramsey as young Matilda

== Episodes ==
Airdates listed as per the BBC One broadcast. All episodes of this series were available to view on BBC iPlayer from 2 February 2018.

No.	Title	Directed by	Written by	Original release date	UK viewers (millions)
1	"Matilda"	Mahalia Belo	Kris Mrksa	2 February 2018	4.84
Professional cellist Matilda Grey is about to begin a world tour until it is derailed by her mother Janice's unexpected suicide in front of Matilda's eyes. After investigating a trap door and breaking mirrors, Ewan Dean also dies by suicide. Whilst sorting through Janice's possessions, Matilda finds a conspicuously-placed box which contains press cuttings and a video tape relating to the disappearance of Carys Howell, a four-year-old girl who disappeared in the Welsh town of Penllynith in 1994. In an attempt to find out what connection her mother may have had to Carys' disappearance, Matilda and her best friend and fellow musician, Hal, head to Penllynith, where they cause a ruckus finding Carys's mother Rose at Ewan's funeral but also meet Nick, Ewan's inheritor. They spend the night at the Dean house with Nick, where Matilda investigates the trap door that seemed to push Ewan to suicide and realizes she herself may be Carys.
2	"The Blue Room"	Mahalia Belo	Kris Mrksa	9 February 2018	N/A
The episode opens with a flashback to Janice telling a young Matilda that her father had been a one night stand who Matilda had never known. Constable PC Graves' arrival interrupts, though she ignores Matilda and Hal's investigation. The villagers are increasingly cold towards the duo as news of the funeral scuffle spreads, but friendly antiques dealer Sylvia welcomes Matilda "back". PC Graves talks to Stephen (the lead investigator in Carys's case), continues her investigation into Ewan's death, and questions handyman/alleged witness Ed's movements the night of. Meanwhile, Matilda observes her possible half brother and notes similarities between them, enraging his father Aron. Various occult-y things happen, including sheep slaughtering. Other occurrences are revealed to be from Sean Howell, Carys's father, who has recognized her in Matilda. He gives her the other half of the best friends necklace Carys had worn.
3	"The Necklace"	Mahalia Belo	Kris Mrksa	16 February 2018	N/A
Graves warns Matilda to stay away from the boy David. Matilda presents the necklace as evidence she might be Carys. Former detective Stephen approaches Matilda afterward on the street to confirm Sean's innocence in the kidnapping. However, when Matilda questions Rose's involvement, he defends her and walks away. Rose confronts Matilda at a park, demands to know what it will take for her to leave her alone, and says she just wants her to go away. Meanwhile, Ed calls Aron, who has been paying him to lie about Ewan's death to the police. Barmaid Trudy takes Matilda to the house where Carys and her parents used to live and comes away believing Matilda is Carys. Matilda asks trustee Meredith about Rose working for her. While caregiver Carl is absent, Meredith says she is not protecting Ewan but Matilda. Meredith invites Matilda back the next day when she says Carl will be absent. After learning that Aron has taken her son away from her, Rose tries to take her own life, saved by Matilda and Hal walking into her house. Upon returning to the big house, Matilda is told that Meredith died that day of a stroke. Afterwards, Matilda receives a scan of her birth certificate (not shown) from Janice's friend; however, the results lead her to smash her cello and cry. At home, Trudy recalls the day of the disappearance. She finds her father putting an article of clothing into the washing machine. He makes an excuse and asks her not to tell her mother.
4	"Blaidd Carreg"	Mahalia Belo	Kris Mrksa	2 March 2018	N/A
In a flashback from 1994, detectives discuss the investigation of Carys's disappearance and her father Sean's erratic behavior and fear of the mirror of the interview room. In the present, Matilda wakes with the same mysterious rash markings on her torso that her mother and Ewan had. While she is smoking outside, she hears a thud and goes inside to discover some books fell from a shelf. One of the books is named Dr. John Dee and the Language of Angels. PC Graves discovers that Ed called Aron numerous times shortly after finding Ewan Dean's body. Matilda sees Dr. Verity Satlow, then goes to Rose's hospital room to check on her. PC Graves discovers her there and gives her last warning for Matilda to stay away from Rose. While doing so, Graves notices the rash around Matilda's neck. Matilda then crosses paths with Laura, a psychiatric patient who claims that she has visions of Carys. Evidence of Harry's involvement in Carys' disappearance comes to light. Aron attacks Hal, citing his and Matilda's interfering being responsible for Rose's attempted suicide. Matilda blacks out and finds herself running towards a cave in the woods, only to be saved by Sean, who explains angels are calling her there via taking over her body and that the angels have connections to mirrors. He agrees to take her down the cave, where she has a vision. She wakes up in the woods and peels back the wallpaper in the Dean house basement to reveal signs she had been drugged and kept there and to find her hands were inexplicably bloody.
5	"Bessie"	Mahalia Belo	Blake Ayshford	9 March 2018	N/A
In a flashback, Sylvia watches an interview of Matilda on television and makes a mysterious call. In the present, Matilda brings Laura to the upstairs bedroom with the blue door, where Laura senses that someone other than Carys, a male, died. Hal travels to Manchester to investigate the validity of Matilda's birth certificate, and uncovers evidence which reveals Janice's true identity. Meanwhile, strange symbols keep reappearing, including on Matilda's back, and she begins to suspect that a second child was held prisoner in Dean House with Carys after visiting a hippie camp where a local claims that the police retrieved a child's body from the woods in 1998 and later denied all knowledge of its existence. Hal goes to find Matilda but has a car accident. Sylvia and the Satlows are trying to call the angels once again, but this time with Matilda's drugged and kidnapped half brother.
6	"Carys"	Mahalia Belo	Kris Mrksa	16 March 2018	N/A
Hal is still missing, and Matilda discovers that Nick stole her phone to prevent Hal from contacting her, and furious, probes Nick into revealing that Sylvia and the Satlows had paid him to watch her. PC Graves continues her investigation into the drug ring, which Stephen has been implicated in, and then she and Matilda head to the Satlows' for answers. Matilda loses it seeing her half brother in their hands and is arrested. Stephen lures Matilda to Dean House on the premise of revealing the truth and saving her half brother – Sylvia explains that they had stolen her as Carys to be a vessel for angels to work miracles. Under manipulation, she enters a tunnel she has been dreaming of, which leads to a place where something inhabits her body. As Sylvia explains that an archangel now controls Matilda, the cult panics about other things crossing over. Later, the police are at Dean House and Graves finds Matilda, recommends her brother go to the hospital. At the hospital, Matilda visits her birth mother, who is awake, alive, and happy to see her. Graves finds her and asks what had happened to the cult. Matilda excuses herself to the bathroom where her eyes go black, while the screen flashes to show several shallow graves of the cult members before flashing back to Matilda smiling into the mirror. She ignores a call from Trudy and begins picking at the dirt on her fingernails.

== Production ==
Requiem comprises six parts, written and created by Kris Mrksa and directed by Mahalia Belo. It is a co-production between New Pictures (whose previous credits include The Missing) for the BBC and Netflix. Production was supported by funding from the Welsh Government.

Filming started in March 2017, and was filmed primarily in Wales. Filming took place in Wales from June 2017. Location filming took place at Cefn Tilla Court in Usk, Newport, Wales and Dolgellau. St David's Hall in Cardiff stood in for a London venue, while other scenes in the fictional town of Penllynith were filmed in Newport and Dolgellau. Cefntilla Court in Monmouthshire was used as the country house where Matilda stays.

== Broadcast ==
Requiem was first broadcast on BBC One on 2 February 2018, with all six episodes being released via BBC iPlayer on the same day.

It was available internationally on Netflix from 23 March 2018, and a DVD was released via Acorn Media on 19 March 2018.

== Reception ==
The review aggregator website Rotten Tomatoes reported a 73% approval rating based on 22 critic reviews. The website's critics consensus reads, "Requiem is as much a mysterious thriller with Lynchian elements as it is a compelling character study."
