= Last Seen =

2026 Australian thriller television miniseries

- Promotional poster
- Genre: Thriller
- Created by: Kris Mrksa
- Based on: The Dispatcher by Ryan David Jahn
- Directed by: Christian Schwochow
- Starring: Patrick Brammall; Brendan Cowell; Maxine Peake; Daniel Henshall; Jessica Wren; Zahra Newman; Taylor Ferguson; Bert La Bonté; Tobias Muhafidin; Carolyn Bock; James Saunders; Chloe Jean Lourdes; Felix Cameron; Colin Friels
- Music by: Isobel Waller-Bridge
- Country of origin: Australia
- Original language: English
- No. of episodes: 6

Production
- Executive producers: Joanna Werner; Christian Schwochow; Kris Mrksa; Jamie Laurenson; Hakan Kousetta
- Producer: Katharina Haase
- Cinematography: Bonnie Elliott
- Editors: Richard Graham; Fiona DeSouza
- Running time: 44–53 minutes
- Production companies: Werner Films Productions; 60Forty Films

Original release
- Network: Apple TV
- Release: 9 September – 7 October 2026

Last Seen is an Australian thriller television miniseries created by Kris Mrksa, based on the book The Dispatcher by Ryan David Jahn. It stars Patrick Brammall, Brendan Cowell, Maxine Peake, and Daniel Henshall. The series premiered on 9 September 2026 on Apple TV and received positive reviews from critics.

== Premise ==
Ian, an alcoholic former police officer, now emergency dispatcher, receives a call about a body found near his home; he thinks it may be his daughter, who went missing 11 years previously.

== Cast ==
=== Main ===
- Patrick Brammall as Ian Ridley
- Brendan Cowell as Henry Reid, a reclusive fundamentalist
- Maxine Peake as Jenna Reid, Henry's wife
- Daniel Henshall as Donald Reid
- Jessica Wren as Debbie Mcguire, Ian Ridley's ex-wife
- Zahra Newman as Isabel Pena, policewoman
- Taylor Ferguson as Polly Foster
- Bert La Bonté as Bill McCracken
- Tobias Muhafidin as Dean Ridley
- Carolyn Bock as Lydia Boyd
- James Saunders as Ben Sizemore
- Chloe Jean Lourdes as Sarah Reid, Henry's daughter
- Felix Cameron as Tommy Brenton
- Colin Friels as Gareth Reid

=== Recurring ===
- Jack Green as Constable Steven Lewis

=== Guest ===
- Fletcher Humphrys as Peter Mulligan
- Justin Bell as Shane Kennedy
- Charly Thorn as Tyra Kennedy
- Aly Zhang as Penny
- Cliff Wood as Les Potter
- Spencer Ellis-Anderson as Andy Kennedy
- Oscar Redding as Jack Brenton
- Carlin Monteiro as Sam Lynch
- Dash Maxwell as Damian "Damo" Tully
- Zane Blumeris as Charlie Halloran
- Will Crittenden as Jayden Brenton
- Judith Roberts as Francine
- Jackson Raine as Angus
- Danny Matier as Tony
- Simon Maiden as Eli
- Julie Forsyth as Rebecca
- Martin Blum as John
- Ana Maria Belo as DCI Christine Jensen
- Robert Plazek as Tactical Officer Tyler

== Production ==
The six-part series is written by Kris Mrksa, who adapted the script from Ryan David Jahn's 2011 novel The Dispatcher, transplanting the setting from midwest US to Australia. Mrksa also served as an executive producer, along with Jamie Laurenson and Hakan Kousetta of 60Forty Films, and Joanna Werner of Werner Film Productions. Christian Schwochow is director and co-executive producer.

Patrick Brammall was cast in the lead role in June 2024. In March 2025, Maxine Peake, Brendan Cowell, Daniel Henshall, Jessica Wren, Zahra Newman, and Chloe Jean Lourdes were added to the cast.

Filming began in Australia in March 2025, with Bonnie Elliott responsible for cinematography. It is the first Apple TV show to be both made and entirely filmed in Australia.

== Episodes ==
No.	Title	Directed by	Written by	Original release date
1	"The Dispatcher"	Christian Schwochow	Kris Mrksa	9 September 2026
2	"The Call"	Christian Schwochow	Kris Mrksa	9 September 2026
3	"The Lie"	Christian Schwochow	Giula Sandler	16 September 2026
4	"The Truth"	Christian Schwochow	Alexei Mizin and Ryan van Dijk	23 September 2026
5	"The Prophet"	Christian Schwochow	Giula Sandler	30 September 2026
6	"The Choice"	Christian Schwochow	Kris Mrksa	7 October 2026

== Release ==
The series premiered globally on Apple TV on 9 September 2026 with two episodes, followed by one each week.

== Reception ==
The review aggregator website Rotten Tomatoes reported an 88% approval rating with an average rating of 7.2/10, based on 25 critic reviews. The website's critics consensus reads, "Last Seen serves its mystery in bold spades, taking a story of familial tragedy to the brink of heart-wrenching and engrossing, while Patrick Brammall's performance takes this series to the next level". Metacritic, which uses a weighted average, assigned a score of 78 out of 100 based on 8 critics, indicating "generally favorable" reviews.

Luke Buckmaster of The Guardian gave the series 5 out of 5 stars, calling it "riveting television" and "one of the standout shows of the year". Brian Tallerico gave it 3 out of 4 stars on RogerEbert.com, praising the "nuanced character work".
