= Ryan David Jahn =

American novelist and screenwriter

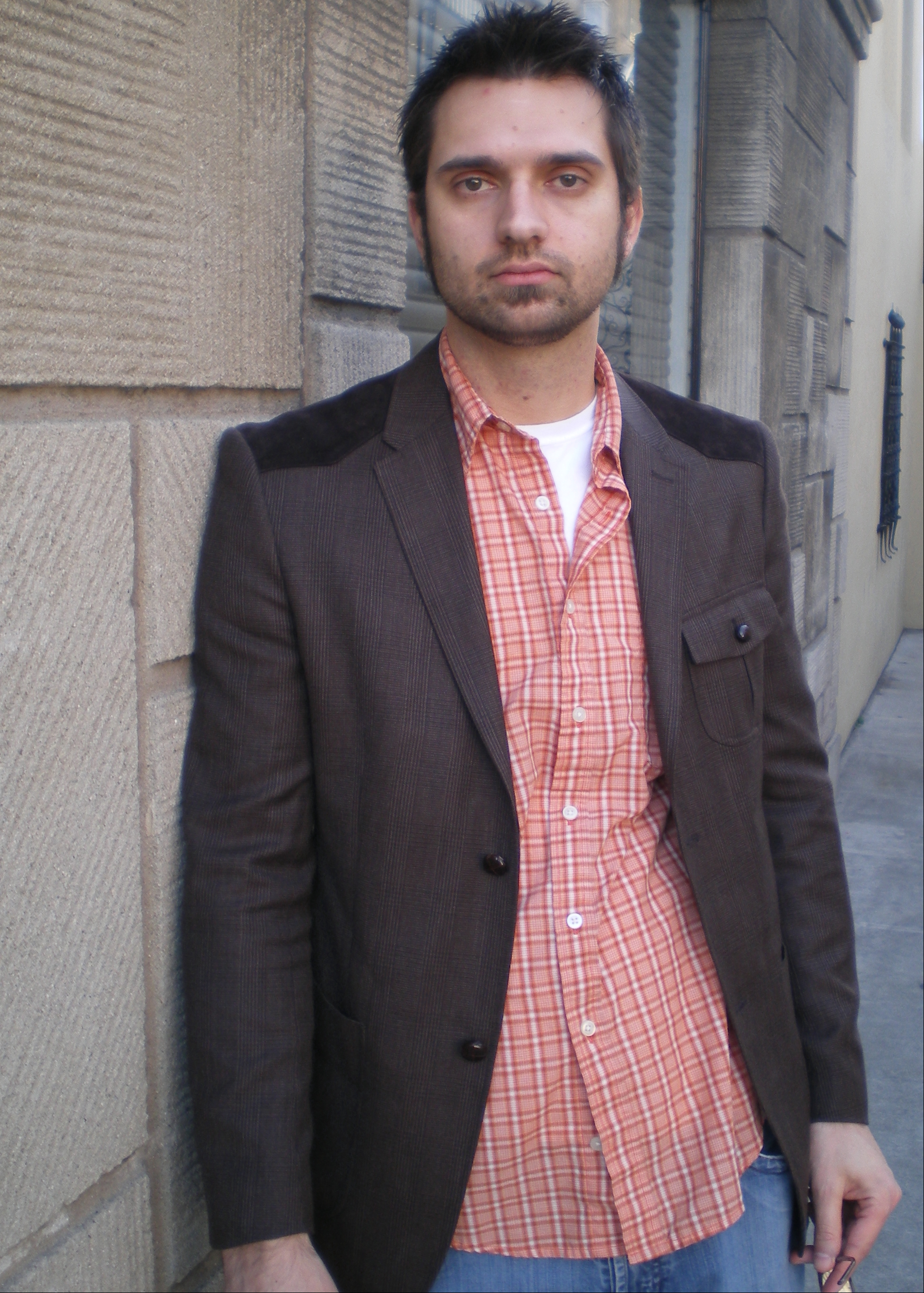
- Jahn in Los Angeles, 2009
- Born: Arizona, United States
- Occupations: Novelist, screenwriter
- Writing career
- Genres: Crime fiction, noir, thriller
- Website: ryandavidjahn.com

Ryan David Jahn is an American novelist and screenwriter. He has written mostly crime fiction, his novels including Acts of Violence (2009), Low Life (2010), and The Dispatcher (2011). The Dispatcher was adapted for television as Last Seen (2026).

== Early life and education ==
Born in Arizona, Ryan David Jahn spent much of his youth moving between his father's apartment in Austin, Texas, and his mother's various rentals in and around Los Angeles, California. At one point, while living near Los Angeles, he was one of six people sharing a one-bedroom apartment, and has said it was to avoid these cramped living quarters that he spent much of his time in public libraries.

He finished high school at sixteen, and, after dropping out of college, joined the army, an experience he has described as "ludicrous".

== Career ==
Though his work has been described as crime fiction, including by Jahn himself ("It revolved around a crime, so that seemed to be what it was"), he has cited writers as diverse as Raymond Carver, Ernest Hemingway, and Stephen King as influences.

His first novel, Acts of Violence, takes place over a period of three hours and revolves around the murder of Katrina Marino, a bar manager stabbed in the courtyard outside her apartment block. Her murder is witnessed by several people, none of whom call the police or try to help, as each denies responsibility, an example of the bystander effect. Though inspired by the murder of Catherine Genovese, the case that first spurred research into the diffusion of responsibility, Jahn has said he wasn't interested in writing a didactic work. "I didn't want to create symbols; I wanted the story to be inhabited by people."> Upon release in 2009 it was both praised as "compassionate and authentic", and criticized for containing "relentless, near-pornographic brutality", though overall critical reception was positive, and it won a Crime Writers' Association John Creasey Dagger for best first novel.

Jahn's second novel, Low Life, was released on 2 July 2010. He has said in interview that "it's about a payroll accountant who lives a lonely, friendless life. One night while he's asleep in bed someone breaks into his apartment and tries to murder him. During the altercation he ends up killing his assailant, and rather than calling the police, he puts the body on ice in his bathtub and tries to find out who wanted him dead and why."

His third novel, The Dispatcher, was released in June 2011, and was listed as one of the Financial Times' top ten crime novels of the year, as well as being long-listed for the Crime Writers' Association Ian Fleming Steel Dagger. It was inspired, in part, by the kidnapping of Jaycee Lee Dugard, though the details of the novel bear no relation to the facts of the case, with characters, events and locations being entirely fictional. It concerns the kidnapping of a seven-year-old girl and her father's attempts to rescue her, when, seven years later, months after she has been declared dead, he learns that she is still alive.

His fourth, The Last Tomorrow, was released in July 2012. Set in 1952, it concerns political corruption, censorship, and drug addiction. The story revolves around a man falsely accused of murder attempting to clear his name.

His fifth, The Gentle Assassin, was released in September 2014.

== Recognition and awards ==
- Acts of Violence
  - Won, CWA New Blood Dagger (2010)
- The Dispatcher
  - Longlisted, CWA Ian Fleming Steel Dagger (2012)
  - Listed, Financial Times, Top Ten Crime Novels of the Year (2012)
  - Listed, The Sunday Times, Top Fifty Thrillers of the Last Five Years (2014)

== Adaptations ==
The Dispatcher was adapted for television by Australian screenwriter Kris Mrksa, and released on Apple TV in September 2026 as Last Seen, starring Patrick Brammall and Brendan Cowell.

== Published works ==
1. Acts of Violence (2009)
2. Low Life (2010)
3. The Dispatcher (2011)
4. The Last Tomorrow (2012)
5. The Gentle Assassin (2014)
6. Dark Hours (2015)
7. The Breakout (2017)
8. The Algebra of Blood (2017)

== Filmography ==
- The Bad Shepherd (2023)
