= Protection (TV series) =

British television series

- Genre: Crime drama
- Created by: Kris Mrksa
- Screenplay by: Kris Mrksa
- Starring: Siobhan Finneran; Katherine Kelly; Nadine Marshall; Barry Ward
- Country of origin: United Kingdom
- Original language: English
- No. of series: 1
- No. of episodes: 6

Production
- Executive producers: Willow Grylls; Charlie Hampton; Elaine Pyke; Kris Mrksa
- Producer: Rebecca Davies
- Production companies: New Pictures; All3Media International; ITV

Original release
- Network: BritBox
- Release: 29 December 2024 (United States and Canada); 16 March 2025 (United Kingdom)

Protection is a British crime drama television series made for ITV. It was released in the United States and Canada on BritBox on 29 December 2024, and was released on ITV1 and ITVX in the UK on 16 March 2025.

== Synopsis ==
Protection explores the world of witness protection in the UK from the point of view of a police officer, DI Liz Nyles.

== Cast ==
- Siobhan Finneran as DI (later Acting DCI) Liz Nyles
- Katherine Kelly as DCI Hannah Wheatley
- Nadine Marshall as DCI Amanda Kelman
- Barry Ward as DS Paul Brandice
- Chaneil Kular as DS Raj Kholi
- David Hayman as Sid Nyles
- Nichola Burley as Gemma Brandice
- Akiya Henry as DS Sue Beardsley
- Alec Newman as Edward Crowther
- Tom Christian as DI Tommy Jardine
- Jodie Price as Jasmine Nyles
- Andrew Knott as DI Richard Bewley
- Ace Bhatti as DCI Arun Kapoor
- Tilly Kaye as Amy McLennan
- Charlotte Mills as DS Rachel Gordon
- Jonathan Cake as John Gibson
- Ian Pirie as Assistant Chief Constable Rory Davenport
- Zora Bishop as Rezan Crowther
- Syrus Lowe as DC Noel Taylor
- Nick Moss as Freddie Howard
- Joseph Millson as Elliot Hughes
- Reuven Walker as Arlo Crowther
- Louise Lee as Nurse
- Naomi Yang as Irene Kim
- Kris Hitchen as Jimmy McLennan
- Catherine Tyldesley as Helen McLennan
- Adam Long as Patrick Ellis
- Waj Ali as Soran Ahmadi
- Anthony Flanagan as DCI Amos Wilson

== Production ==
The series was written by Australian writer Kris Mrksa, who had written for Underbelly and Glitch. He drew from first-hand accounts by a 30-year veteran of witness protection specialist for the Metropolitan Police in which they handled cases including police informants, war criminals, and terrorists.

The six-part series is produced by New Pictures in association with All3Media International. Willow Grylls and Charlie Hampton serve as executive producers alongside Elaine Pyke and Kris Mrksa. The series is produced by Rebecca Davies.

Filming took place from July 2023 through to September 2023 in the north-west of England, with filming locations including Crosby , Birkenhead, Runcorn, and Liverpool.

== Broadcast ==
The series premiered in the United States and Canada on Britbox on 29 December 2024, and was released on Stan in Australia on 10 January 2025.

It was released on ITVX on 16 March 2025, as well as a linear broadcast on ITV1 beginning the same day.
