= D'Alpuget =

D'Alpuget is a surname. Notable people with the surname include:

- Blanche d'Alpuget (1944–2026), Australian writer and activist
- Lou D'Alpuget (1880–1957), Australian rugby league footballer
