= Turtle Beach (film) =

1992 Australian film

- Theatrical release poster
- Directed by: Stephen Wallace
- Screenplay by: Ann Turner
- Based on: Turtle Beach by Blanche d'Alpuget
- Produced by: Matt Carroll; Greg Coote; Graham Burke; Arnon Milchan
- Starring: Greta Scacchi; Joan Chen; Jack Thompson; Art Malik; Norman Kaye
- Cinematography: Russell Boyd
- Edited by: William M. Anderson (sup.); Louise Innes; Lee Smith
- Music by: Chris Neal
- Production companies: Regency International Pictures; Village Roadshow Pictures
- Distributed by: Warner Bros.
- Release dates: 19 March 1992 (Australia); 1 May 1992 (U.S.)
- Running time: 90 minutes
- Country: Australia
- Language: English
- Box office: $778,535

Turtle Beach, also known as The Killing Beach, is a 1992 Australian film directed by Stephen Wallace and starring Greta Scacchi and Joan Chen. The screenplay was written by Ann Turner, based on the 1981 novel of the same name by Blanche d'Alpuget. It caused controversy in Malaysia, where the government took exception to scenes of Malays executing refugees.

== Premise ==
Judith, an Australian photojournalist, leaves her family to cover the story of Vietnamese boat people in a Malaysian refugee camp. There she befriends Minou, a Vietnamese streetwalker, who has married a diplomat and together they try to bring awareness to the terrible conditions suffered by the people there.

== Cast ==
- Greta Scacchi as Judith
- Joan Chen as Minou
- Jack Thompson as Ralph
- Art Malik as Kanan
- Norman Kaye as Hobday
- Victoria Longley as Sancha
- Martin Jacobs as Richard
- George Whaley as Bill
- William McInnes as Minder
- Sean Scully as Businessman #1

== Production ==
Ann Turner was working for Roadshow when she was hired to adapt the novel, which she loved. However she says the project soon became compromised:

When I first saw the film I thought it looked like the writer was on drugs or completely insane, because you could see there were two films working within the one film... There were a lot of different voices in terms of the finance-raising, there was American money, and the producers—many, plural—really had very different views of what the film should be. Greta Scacchi really liked the book and liked the script and fought for it. But during the process of developing the script, they brought in an American writer and it really changed. I was off directing Police Rescue at the time. Then the cast, when they were in Thailand, said they'd signed on the script that I'd written and wanted to change it back to that. There was something about the American script that was more like King Rat than Turtle Beach. So then I was flown out to Thailand to rewrite the rewrite and the film ended up actually being a combination of both.

The film was financed in part by the people who had invested in Blood Oath, directed by Stephen Wallace. They were enthusiastic about that film and hired Wallace to direct. Wallace:

I loved the book and I really wanted to make the film. I think in the end the script really wasn't good enough and I had a terrible run-in with the producer on it. It was just a nightmare. I wanted to make a film about Asia again, because I thought Asia was misunderstood in Australia and I thought the more light we can shed on Asians, the better... But unfortunately in the film, it all went haywire ... The producers all wanted to make Pretty Woman. I said, "It's not Pretty Woman, it's a film about Asia." I had to fight to get an Indian to play the Indian; it was a struggle from start to finish. There was plenty of money, but I kept compromising on it. I kept compromising about the place where the beach was, about the roughness of the set. I wanted it really rough. Then there was this whole thing about the disco place, which was actually Matt Carroll's idea, something he'd seen in Thailand... Also the massacre on the beach. Everyone was worried, the massacre had to be built up, whereas the massacre was wrong—emotionally and morally wrong. All this was pushed and I felt I'd lost control of the film.

The Australian Film Finance Corporation invested $5,248,857 in the film.

Stephen Wallace finished the film and made his cut but then he was fired off the film. Extra scenes were shot:

I should have taken my name off it. I got advised by my agents not to, but I should have. I don't feel the film is mine. A lot of the shots are mine, but extra stuff was shot and my name is on it, so I've got to take responsibility for it. But it's the one film I've made that I feel ashamed of... it was Matt Carroll who made it.

== Release ==
Turtle Beach grossed $359,881 at the box office in Australia and $778,535 in the United States. Wallace ceased directing feature films until his 2018 release "A Suburban Love Story". He says making this wrecked his feature film career.

Ozmovies says of the release:

The film was a flop, and notoriously and jokingly came to be dubbed Turkey Beach by some film pundits. Roadshow reverted to the old trick of opening the show without reviewer previews, which almost guaranteed a jaundiced response. The film didn’t do as badly as some early FFC films - at least it scored a theatrical release and turned a little coin - but relative to budget and considering the name cast and controversies surrounding it, the result was both a commercial and a critical misfire.

Chen would later express regret for asking for her character Josie Packard to be written out of Twin Peaks in order to film Turtle Beach, calling it "a disaster of a film that no one ever saw."

== Soundtrack ==
- "Rock-A-Beatin' Boogie" performed by Bill Haley
- "Fly Away" performed by Simone Dee
- "Come on Boys" performed by Simone Dee

== Critical reception ==
Chris Hicks of Deseret News:

Though its subject matter – the tragedy of the Vietnamese boat people – is inherently interesting and its players attractive, Turtle Beach is so full of melodramatic hokum that it never rises above superficial soap opera... [The film] superficially resembles The Year of Living Dangerously, but is undermined by simplistic dialogue (Chen explains everything the film has already shown us) and obvious plotting (government paranoia plays a large part in the film's twists and turns)... In the end, the film is little more than platitudes mixed with exploitation, and certainly a waste of Scacchi's and Chen's talents.

== See also ==
- Cinema of Australia
