= Alexander Outhred =

Australian actor (born 1977)

Alex Outhred
- Born: Alexander Outhred; 1 January 1977 (age 49); Adelaide, South Australia, Australia
- Occupation: Actor
- Years active: 1993

Alexander Outhred (born 1 January 1977) is a former Australian film actor. He is perhaps best known for his role as Alan Marshall, a young pubescent boy going through a sexual awakening in the 1993 Australian biographical romantic drama film Hammers Over the Anvil.

== Career ==
Outhred played Alan Marshall in the 1993 Australian biographical romantic drama film Hammers Over the Anvil, with New Zealand actor Russell Crowe and English actress Charlotte Rampling. His character has polio, and following a long line of actors who won awards for playing disabled people, he won awards for his performance. Outhred won the Australian Film Institute Young Actors Award. His co-star, Russell Crowe, one-upped him several years later for playing a schizophrenic. Australian film director Ann Turner praised Outhred's ability to feign admiration with regular smiles and distant dreamy looks. After Hammers Over the Anvil and winning AACTA Award for Best Young Actors Award, Outhred retired from acting.

== Personal life ==
Outhred now works as a research scientist.
