= The Hobyahs =

Scottish-American fairy tale

The Hobyahs is a fairy tale collected by Mr S. V. Proudfit of Washington, D.C., credited to a family from Perth, Scotland. Joseph Jacobs included it in More English Fairy Tales. His source was American Folk-Lore Journal, iv, 173.

== Synopsis ==
A man, woman, girl, and little dog lived in a house made of hempstalks. The Hobyahs came for several nights, shouting "Hobyah! Hobyah! Hobyah! Tear down the hempstalks, eat up the old man and woman, and carry off the little girl!" For several nights, the dog barked, scaring them off, but the old man was angry at its barking and cut off its tail, then its legs, then its head. Then the Hobyahs tore down the house, ate the old man and woman, and carried off the girl in a bag. They hung up the bag at home and knocked it, shouting, "Look me!" They went to sleep, because they slept by daytime. A man heard her crying and took her home, putting his big dog in the sack. When the Hobyahs opened the sack, the dog ate them all.

== Motifs ==
Jacobs noted that the Hobyahs, though now destroyed, resembled "the bogies or spirits of the comma bacillus".

Escaping from a bag is a common fairy tale motif, but the technique used is not. Such tales as Molly Whuppie and The Little Peasant feature the character tricking his way out.

== Retellings ==
Robert D. San Souci retold it in the picture book The Hobyahs. Hobyahs also appear in Joan Aiken's book The Witch of Clatteringshaws.

A version was published in Victoria in Australia in The School Paper periodical in 1926. A few years later, the story was retold in the second book of The Victorian Readers widely available in Victorian schools for several decades, now with 'little dog dingo' and set in the Australian bush.

The tale was used as the imagery for the protagonist's fantasies in the Australian film Celia, directed by Ann Turner. The telling differs, however, in that there is no girl, the Hobyahs make off with the old woman, and the old man gives the little dog back his head, legs, and tail, and together they go in search of the old woman.
