= Kris Mrksa =

Australian screenwriter

- Occupation: Screenwriter
- Years active: 2001–
- Known for: Devil's Dust (2012); Requiem (2018); Protection (2024); Last Seen (2026)

Kris Mrksa is an Australian screenwriter who has written extensively for television in Australia and the UK. He is known for his work on shows such as Underbelly, The Slap, and The Secret Life of Us in Australia. He has also created and written several series, including the BBC One series Requiem (2018), the ITV series Protection (2024), and the Australian mystery thriller series Last Seen, released on Apple TV in September 2026.

== Early life and education ==
Growing up, Mrksa's mother took him and his brother to the local library every weekend to choose new books. During his adolescence he became a fan of Kurt Vonnegut's books.

As a teenager, he knew that he wanted to be a writer, although he thought probably of novels or poetry; in later adolescence, he became a "film buff" and especially enjoyed watching old films of the 1960s and early 1970s on late-night TV.

== Career ==
Mrksa wrote his first script for the short film Sparky D Comes to Town in 2001, written in both English and Serbian. It was directed by Maciek Wszelaki and filmed in Melbourne, and tells the story of a son of an emigrant family. His first commercially-produced credits were all for children's television, the first being Horace and Tina in 2001, which he wrote for Jonathan M. Shiff Productions.

In 2003, he wrote 11 episodes of Greeks on the Roof a parody talkshow, in which Mary Coustas played Effie Stephanidis, a character from her 1990s Acropolis Now comedy series.

He co-wrote the script for the 2007 made-for-TV biopic about Graham Kennedy, The King, as well as the TV series Underbelly, The Slap (2011; 2 episodes), East West 101 (2007), and The Secret Life of Us (2005). In 2008 and 2009, he wrote episodes of The Saddle Club, Carla Cametti PD, Rush, Snake Tales, and Packed to the Rafters. He wrote the 2012 two-part ABC docudrama Devil's Dust, based on the James Hardie asbestos saga, produced by FremantleMedia.

Mrksa created and wrote the psychological thriller series Requiem for BBC One and Netflix, filmed in Wales in 2017 and broadcast in 2018.

He was then commissioned to create and write White House Farm, a crime drama based on the White House Farm murders committed in 1985 by Jeremy Bamber. He drew from two books to adapt create the screenplay: The Murders at White House Farm by Carol Ann Lee, and In Search of the Rainbow's End: Inside the White House Farm Murders by Colin Caffell, whose children were victims of the crime, as well as interviewing investigators involved in the murders. He said of the series, which was released in October 2020 on HBO Max, "I hope that the show does act as a critique of the institutional culture where dissenting voices or whistleblowers or the little person can so easily be crushed and not listened to, and sadly that’s still a problem in the world today".

In 2019 he was commissioned by Apple TV and New Pictures to develop a mystery-thriller series based on a novel. In March 2022 Paramount+ commissioned an international drama thriller series to be developed by New Pictures and Viacom International Studios, about two best friends on the run from British police. Mrksa wrote the script for the series, initially titled The Blue, retitled No Escape by the time filming in Thailand concluded in 2023. It was adapted from a bestselling novel by Lucy Clarke.

In late 2023, ITV commissioned a new thriller series to be created and written by Mrksa, titled Protection and starring Siobhan Finneran, Nadine Marshall, and Katherine Kelly. Mrksa also co-executive produced the series, alongside Willow Grylls (co-founder and CEO of New Pictures, which produced), Elaine Pyke, and Charlie Hampton. The series premiered in the US and Canada on Britbox on 29 December 2024, and was released on Stan in Australia on 10 January 2025.

In September 2026 Last Seen, starring Patrick Brammall, Brendan Cowell, and Maxine Peake, written and executive produced by Mrksa, was released on Apple TV. His screenplay was adapted from a crime novel by Ryan David Jahn, titled The Dispatcher.

=== Influences ===
He has said that in screenwriting, he was most influenced by shows such as Twin Peaks and The Larry Sanders Show, and Lars Von Trier's Kingdom: "They were a glimpse of the future, and they inspired me to take TV seriously as an art form".

== Recognition and awards ==
=== Personal awards ===
- 2011: Winner, FOXTEL Fellowship for Excellence in Television Writing, in the AWGIE Awards
- 2017: Winner, Jan Sardi Award for his significant achievements as a screenwriter

=== Works ===
- 2001: AFI Award for Best Screenplay in a Short Film in the 2001 Australian Film Institute Awards, for Sparky D Comes to Town
- 2009: Winner, AFI Award for Best Screenplay in Television for Episode 11 of Underbelly: A Tale of Two Cities, titled "The Brotherhood"
- 2012: Nominated, AACTA Award for Best Screenplay in Television in the 1st AACTA Awards, for The Slap, Episode 1 "Hector"
- 2014: Betty Roland Prize for Scriptwriting in the New South Wales Premier's Literary Awards, for Devil's Dust
- Co-winner of 3 AWGIE Awards (for East West 101, The Slap, Underbelly), and a nomination (with his co-writer for The King)

== Personal life ==
Mrksa is married to a writer of books and newspaper columns. They have two children.

== Selected filmography ==
=== As screenwriter ===
Mrksa's writing credits include:

- Sparky D Comes to Town (2001)
- Pirate Islands (2003)
- Greeks on the Roof (2003; 11 eps)
- Wicked Science (2004; 1 ep)
- Scooter: Secret Agent (2005; 1 ep)
- The Secret Life of Us (2005; s4, 2 eps)
- Kick (2007; eps)
- East West 101 (2007; s1 e4)
- The King (2007; co-written with Jaime Browne)
- The Saddle Club (2008–2009; eps)
- Carla Cametti PD (2008–2009; eps)
- Rush (2009; s2 e7)
- Snake Tales (2008-2009; 2 eps)
- Packed to the Rafters (2009; s2 e13)
- Underbelly (2009–2010; at least 8 eps)
- Underbelly Files: The Man Who Got Away (2011; telemovie)
- The Slap (2011; 2 episodes)
- Devil's Dust (2012)
- The Turning, chapter "Damaged Goods"
- The Time of Our Lives (2013–2014; 3 eps)
- Janet King, (2014; s1, 2 eps)
- Glitch (2015 & 2019; co-writer, s1 & s3)
- Nowhere Boys, Series 3: Two Moons Rising (2016–17; 2 eps)
- Requiem (2018; creator and writer)
- White House Farm (2020; creator and writer)
- Protection (2024; creator and writer)
- No Escape (2023)
- Last Seen (2026; writer and executive producer)

=== As script editor ===
- Wilfred (2 series; 2007 & 2010)
