= Astral Sea =

1981 poetry collection by Alan Gould

- Author: Alan Gould
- Language: English
- Genre: Poetry collection
- Publisher: Angus and Robertson
- Publication date: 1981
- Publication place: Australia
- Media type: Print
- Pages: 72 pp.
- Awards: 1981 NSW Premier's Literary Award – Kenneth Slessor Prize for Poetry, winner
- ISBN: 0207143560

Astral Sea is a collection of poems by Australian poet Alan Gould, published by Angus and Robertson in Australia in 1981.

The collection contains 43 poems from a variety of sources, with some published here for the first time.

The collection won the 1981 NSW Premier's Literary Award – Kenneth Slessor Prize for Poetry.

== Contents ==
- "Batu Caves"
- "The Coral"
- "Energies (Energies)"
- "Two Sea Eagles (Northwest Island, Capricornia Group)"
- "The Heartland"
- "The Barbarians"
- "The Regulars"
- "From Pozieres"
- "The Vinlanders : Erik Thorvaldsson"
- "The Vinlanders : Leif the Lucky (The Vinlanders : Leif Eriksson)"
- "The Vinlanders : Thorgisl Orrabeinsfostri"
- "The Vinlanders : Thorfinn Karlsefni"
- "The Vinlanders : Gudrid Thorbjornsdaughter"
- "The Vinlanders : Thorhall the Hunter"
- "The Vinlanders : Thorvald Eriksson"
- "The Vinlanders : Freydis Eriksdaughter"
- "The Vinlanders : Herjolfsness, Greenland, 1540"
- "The Songs of Ymir : Birth"
- "The Songs of Ymir : First Dream"
- "The Songs of Ymir : Buri"
- "The Songs of Ymir : Man / Woman"
- "The Songs of Ymir : Second Dream"
- "The Songs of Ymir : Death"
- "The Tarantella"
- "Marco Polo Remembers the Province of Kamul"
- "Suite Irlondaise"
- "The Grand Economy : Four Ghazals"
- "Marine Photographs : The Sea Herself"
- "Marine Photographs : Still Lives (Ariel, Thermopylae, 1872)"
- "Marine Photographs : Port of Melbourne Song"
- "Marine Photographs : Valparaiso Song"
- "Marine Photographs : Krakatoa (Charles Bal, 1883)"
- "Marine Photographs : Their Luck (The Dundee, 1827)"
- "Marine Photographs : Australian Negative (Torrens, 1883, Recalled 1920)"
- "Any Two Pictures (Shomberg, 1855) (Marine Photographs : Any Two Pictures (Shomberg, 1855))"
- "The Wave (Blackadder, 1873) (Marine Photographs : The Wave (Blackadder, 1873))"
- "Recalling Her Launching (Cutty Sark, November 23rd 1869) (Marine Photographs : Recalling Her Launching (Cutty Sark, November 23rd 1869))"
- "Marine Photographs : Ice (Cromdale, 1892)"
- "Marine Photographs : Port of Melbourne (Mermerus and Others, 1896)"
- "Marine Photographs : 35 Degrees S 5 Degrees W (Sobraon, 1883)"
- "Marine Photographs : Tropic (Harbinger, 1880s)"
- "Marine Photographs : The Custom (Arctic Whaler, 1820 Approx)"
- "Marine Photographs : Ship in a Bottle (Loch Ard, 1878)"

== Critical reception ==
Writing in The Age Thomas Shapcott noted Gould's Icelandic ancestry and commented: "The two major sequences 'The Vinlanders' and 'The Songs of Ymir' are undoubtedly the core of this collection. 'The Vinlanders' is a set of nine Sestinas – which must make Alan Gould the most determined practitioner of this form in Australia. Determined – and successful."

In a review of a number of different poetry collections in The Sydney Morning Herald poet Jennifer Maiden noted: "Alan Gould writes formidable poems about heroism and the warriors of Norse mythology. The work has a fatalism and spiritual resonance that reminds me of Joseph Conrad."

== Awards ==
- 1981 NSW Premier's Literary Award – Kenneth Slessor Prize for Poetry, winner

== See also ==
- 1981 in Australian literature
