= Young Lions (book) =

210 graphic novella by Blaise Larmee

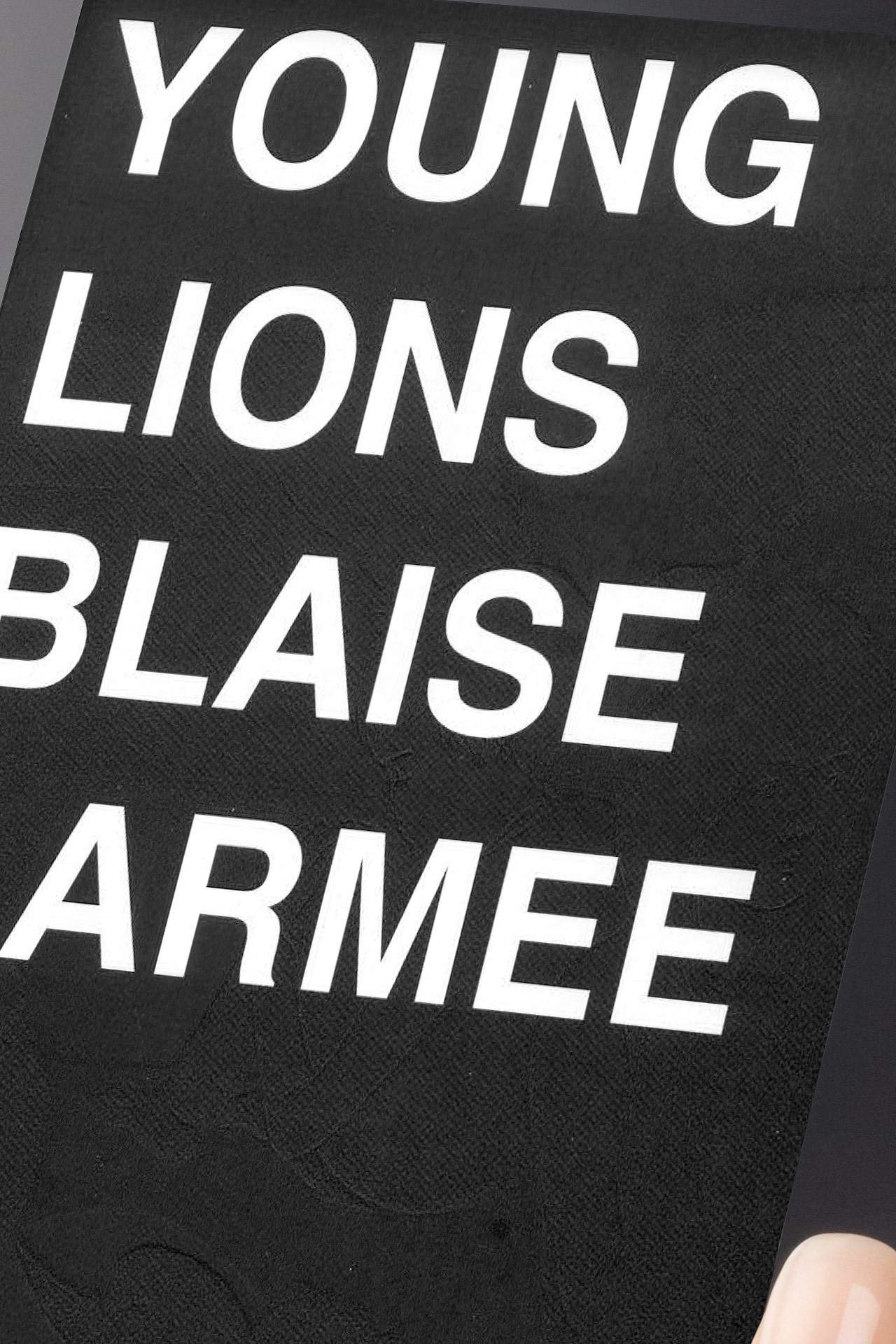
Cover of the Kindle edition of Young Lions by Blaise Larmee

Young Lions is the 2010 debut graphic novella by American author Blaise Larmee. The novella was created in order to compete for one of the prestigious self-publishing grants awarded by the Xeric Foundation. After receiving the grant in 2009 Larmee stated "I imagined after I got the Xeric that I would either write a different graphic novel to publish, or pocket the money. I ended up liking Young Lions."

== Summary ==
The story concerns three friends who take a fresh-faced newcomer on a road trip in the hopes that she will inspire and revive them.

== Reception ==
Conceived as a Xeric submission, the book was noted for its rushed appearance, conventional narrative, and appropriated style.

While reviews of the book tended to be positive, The subject of the author himself was polarizing. Larmee repeatedly described his creative process as "sarcastic" and agreed that "public discourse is inseparable from the book itself." Dan Nadel wrote,

It is also, most obviously, the work of a young man (born in 1985) trying to understand the mythologies he's interpreted for himself. That is the second, and for me, most intriguing narrative here, and one inseparable from Larmee's writing on art and comics.

Young Lions garnered Larmee an Ignatz nomination for Promising New Talent. In the book's sole blurb, David Heatley wrote, "Blaise Larmee is making thoughtful, refreshing, beautiful comics that you can drink with your eyes."

== Censorship ==
In 2011 The Canada Border Services Agency seized copies of Young Lions in Buffalo, NY on suspicion of obscenity. The customs officers found pencil sketches of a vaguely sexual scene. After reviewing the book, the agency declared Young Lions to be legally obscene and banned its importation into Canada. The seized copies were destroyed.
