= Victoria Longley =

Australian actress

- Born: 24 September 1960; Sydney, New South Wales, Australia
- Died: 29 August 2010 (aged 49); St Leonards, New South Wales, Australia
- Occupation: Actress
- Years active: 1985–2009

Victoria Constance Mary Longley (24 September 1960 – 29 August 2010) was an Australian actress. She worked extensively in television.

== Early life ==
Longley was the daughter of doctor and rowing coach Eric Longley. Her mother Pamela studied Law as she brought up her four daughters, of whom Victoria was the youngest. When she was young she lived in Longueville NSW.

== Career ==
Longley made her screen debut in a film called The More Things Change as a pregnant au pair. An early foray into television was in the epic miniseries The Dirtwater Dynasty, opposite Hugo Weaving, and Edens Lost, a 4-part miniseries for ABC in 1989. In the ABC series, Mercury, not-so-loosely based on the Sunday Age, she played a senior journalist, alongside Geoffrey Rush cast as editor, believed to be modelled on Bruce Guthrie.

Other television credits included: Murder Call, Wildside, Water Rats, Farscape, The Alien Years, Turtle Beach, Young Lions, and All Saints.

== Death ==
Longley died from breast cancer, aged 49, in St Leonards, New South Wales.

== Filmography ==
=== Film ===
Year	Title	Role	Notes
1985	The More Things Change	Geraldine	
1989	Celia	Alice Tanner	
1992	Turtle Beach	Sancha	
1994	Dallas Doll	Rosalind Sommers	
1994	Talk	Julia Strong	
1995	Hayride to Hell	Hilary Weygate	Short film
1997	Diana & Me	Pauline Challinor	
2000	Happy Mother's Day	Mum	Short film
2002	Grey		Short film
2003	Unlocked	Renee	Short film

=== Television ===
Year	Title	Role	Notes
1985	I Can‘t Get Started	Amanda	TV movie
1986	Land of Hope	Regular role	Miniseries
1988	The Dirtwater Dynasty	Kate McBride / Nancy McBride	Miniseries
1988	The Alien Years	Elizabeth Parsons	Miniseries
1989	Edens Lost	Bea	Miniseries
1990	Ring of Scorpio	Lead role	Miniseries
1992	Six Pack	Kelly	Anthology series, 1 episode: "Piccolo Mondo"
1993	Seven Deadly Sins	Deirdre	Miniseries, episode: "Lust"
1993	Crimebroker	Carver	TV movie
1995	G.P.	Barbara	1 episode
1996	Mercury	Georgi Singer	13 episodes
1997	Murder Call	Cynthia Chase	1 episode
1997–99	Wildside	Inspector Virginia King	57 episodes
1998	A Difficult Woman	Giselle McKenzie	Miniseries
1999	Water Rats	Tracy Bennett	1 episode
2000, 2002–03	All Saints	Kath Williams	1 episode
2001	Farscape	Neeyala	2 episodes
2001	Finding Hope	Meg	TV movie
2002	Young Lions	Police Psychiatrist	4 episodes
2002–04	All Saints	Margaret O'Brien	4 episodes
2003	BlackJack: Murder Archive	Therese Ricci	TV movie

== Awards and nominations ==
Year	Award	Category	Work	Result
2006	Sydney Theatre Awards	Best Actress in a Lead Role	The Goat, or Who is Sylvia?	Won
2006	Helpmann Awards	Best Female Actor in a Play	The Goat, or Who is Sylvia?	Nominated
1994	1994 Australian Film Institute Awards	Australian Film Institute Award for Best Actress in a Leading Role	Talk	Nominated
1989	1989 Australian Film Institute Awards	Best Actress in a Supporting Role	Celia	Won
1988	1988 Australian Film Institute Awards	Best Performance by an Actress in a Telefeature or Miniseries	The Alien Years	Nominated
