= Frank Gallacher =

Scottish-Australian actor (1943–2009)

- Born: 7 April 1943; Glasgow, Scotland
- Died: 23 February 2009 (aged 65); Melbourne, Victoria, Australia
- Occupation: Actor
- Years active: 1967–2009

Frank Gallacher (7 April 1943 – 23 February 2009) was a Scottish-Australian actor.

== Early life ==
Gallacher was born in Glasgow in 1943. In 1962, aged 19, he was working in London when his parents and younger sister decided to emigrate to Australia. Gallacher declined to join them, preferring to remain in London, but emigrated to Brisbane a year later where he worked as a schoolteacher. He spent three years in Papua New Guinea teaching English. On his return to Brisbane, he joined an amateur theatre company, which eventually gained him admission to the Queensland Theatre Company.

== Career ==
In 1977, Gallacher was in Melbourne, performing in David Williamson's play The Club, and he remained with the Melbourne Theatre Company from then on. In 2005, he played Lear in the MTC production of King Lear.

He was well known in the 1970s for his television roles in Shannon's Mob and The Lost Islands.

His film roles included Proof (1991), Dark City (1998), Till Human Voices Wake Us (2002), Peter Pan (2003), One Perfect Day (2004) and December Boys (2007).

== Filmography ==
=== Film ===
Year	Title	Role	Notes
1979	The John Sullivan Story	Stipra	TV film
1981	The Homicide Squad	Det Sgt Jerry Harris	TV film
1982	Heatwave	Dick Molnar	Feature film
1983	Goodbye Paradise	Keith	Feature film
1988	Raw Silk	Johnson	TV film
1989	The Humpty Dumpty Man	Gerry Shadlow	TV film
1991	Proof	Vet	Feature film
1991	Deadly	Mick Thornton	Feature film
1993	Hammers Over the Anvil	Mr. Thomas the Preacher	Feature film
1992	A Royal Commission into the Australian Economy	Malcolm Turnbull	TV film
1993	Kill or Be Killed	Gary	Feature film
1994	Dallas Doll	Stephen Sommers	Feature film
1996	Mr. Reliable	Don Ferguson	Feature film
1996	Cody: Fall from Grace	Duncan White	TV film
1997	Amy	Dr Urquhart	Feature film
1997	One Way Ticket	Macca	TV film
1998	Dark City	Chief Inspector Stromboli	Feature film
2000	Muggers	Det. Sgt. Kernahan	Feature film
2001	Child Star: The Shirley Temple Story	Schenk	TV movie
2001	Like It Is	Doc Keenan	Short film
2002	Black and White	Justice Reed	Feature film
2002	Till Human Voices Wake Us	Maurie Lewis	Feature film
2003	Ain't Got No Jazz	David Mann	Short film
2003	Peter Pan	Alsatian Fogarty (Pirate Crew)	Feature film
2004	One Perfect Day	Malcolm	Feature film
2006	Stepfather of the Bride	Ian	Feature film
2007	Curtin	Jack Beasley	TV film
2007	December Boys	Father Scully	Feature film

=== Television ===
Year	Title	Role	Notes
1967	Bellbird		TV series
1973	Boney	Barman	TV series, 1 episode
1973	Number 96	Hank	TV series, 1 episode
1973	Seven Little Australians	Postman	TV miniseries, 2 episodes
1974	Division 4	Glen Evans / Joe Bianchi	TV series, 2 episodes
1974	Matlock Police	Martin Ross-Smith	TV series, 1 episode
1974	Silent Number	Barney	TV series, 1 episode
1975	Ben Hall	'Goobang' Mick Connolly	TV miniseries, 3 episodes
1975	Homicide	Sydney Green	TV series, 1 episode
1975-76	Shannon's Mob	Michael Jamieson	TV series, 13 episodes
1976	Rush	James McNeilly	TV series, 1 episode
1976	Bluey	Jules	TV series, 1 episode
1976	The Outsiders	Sgt Peter Blakely	TV series, 1 episode
1976	The Lost Islands	Quig, Quad's henchman	TV series, 24 episodes
1978	Against the Wind	Will Price	TV miniseries, 11 episodes
1979	Prisoner	Paul Bentley	TV series, 2 episodes
1979	Twenty Good Years	Geoff Wilson	TV series, 1 episode
1980	Locusts and Wild Honey	Jan	TV miniseries, 3 episodes
1980	Young Ramsay	Dave Foster	TV series, 1 episode
1980	Secret Valley	Dan McCormack	TV series, 1 episode
1980	The Coast Town Kids	Len Wolding	TV pilot
1980	Water Under the Bridge	Luigi Mazzini	TV miniseries, 1 episode
1980	The Last Outlaw	Detective Ward	TV miniseries, 4 episodes
1978-81	Cop Shop	Robert Harris / Stephen Morris / Vitoria Rossi / Robert Clements / Vince Reed / John Maynard	TV series, 9 episodes
1981	Bellamy	Flanagan	TV miniseries, 1 episode
1982	Winner Take All	Mangione	TV miniseries, 10 episodes
1983	Carson's Law	Dr Hellman	TV series, 2 episodes
1983	All the Rivers Run	Mac	TV miniseries, 6 episodes
1983	Under Capricorn	Quaife	TV miniseries, 2 episodes
1984	Waterfront	Paddy Ryan	TV miniseries, 3 episodes
1984	A Country Practice	Reggie Russell	TV series, 2 episodes
1984	Banjo's Australia	Reader	TV special
1986	A Fortunate Life	Bill Oliver	TV ministry, 1 episode
1986	The Flying Doctors	Harry Morgan	TV series, 1 episode
1986	The Great Bookie Robbery	Inspector Castleway	TV miniseries, 3 episodes
1987	The Shiralee	Beauty	TV miniseries, 2 episodes
1988	Rafferty's Rules	Louis D'Oering	TV series, 1 episode
1991	Boys from the Bush	Gavin	TV series, 1 episode
1991	Brides of Christ	Irish Dean	TV miniseries, 1 episode
1992	Cluedo	Detective Sergeant Bogong	TV series, 21 episodes
1993	Seven Deadly Sins	Elliot	TV series, 1 episode
1995	The Damnation of Harvey McHugh	Sergeant Dale	TV miniseries, 1 episode
1995	Janus	Haines	TV series, 1 episode
1995	Snowy River: The McGregor Saga	Grady Hocking	TV series, 1 episode
1996	The Bite	Larry Schofield	TV series, 2 episodes
1998	The Violent Earth	Father Moissan	TV miniseries, 3 episodes
1998	Driven Crazy	Morris	TV series, 1 episode
1998	Small Tales and True	Professor Francis Goodrich	TV series, 1 episode
1994-2001	Blue Heelers	Don 'Pop' Watson / Geoff Garrick	TV series, 3 episodes
2000-04	Stingers	William Franks / Jack Conrad	TV series, 2 episodes
2001	Horace and Tina	Horace	TV series, 26 episodes
2002	Marshall Law	Frank Dellabosca	TV miniseries, 8 episodes
2004	Fergus McPhail	MacCorkindale	TV series, 1 episode
2005	MDA	Dr. Rupert Carr	TV series, 4 episodes
2006	Two Twisted	Pierce Bristow	TV series
2007	All Saints	Bruce Campion	TV series, 1 episode
2009	Tangle	Pat Mahady	TV series, season 1, 7 episodes

== Stage ==
=== As actor ===
Year	Title	Role	Notes
1970	Wait Until Dark		SGIO Theatre
1971	The Wind in the Sassafras Trees		SGIO Theatre
1971	The Legend of King O'Malley		New South Wales, Playhouse Canberra, Queensland, SGIO Theatre
1972	Lock Up Your Daughters		SGIO Theatre
1972	Assault with a Deadly Weapon		SGIO Theatre
1972	The Schoolmistress		SGIO Theatre
1972	Twelfth Night	Sir Toby Belch	SGIO Theatre
1972	The Ruling Class		SGIO Theatre
1972	Rooted		Attic Theatre, Toowoomba
1973	Goldilocks and the Four Bears R. Certificate		Ensemble Theatre
1973–74	A Hard God		Nimrod Street Theatre, Playhouse Canberra
1974	Summer of the Seventeenth Doll	Roo	SGIO Theatre
1975	One Flew Over the Cuckoo's Nest	Randle McMurphy	SGIO Theatre
1975–76	An Evening with Robert Burns		SGIO Theatre, Playhouse Adelaide
1976	The Last of the Knucklemen	Mad Dog	Playhouse Adelaide, Maitland Town Hall, Port Pirie Town Hall, Whyalla Institute, Port Lincoln Civic Hall, Cowell Institute, Port Augusta College, Woomera Village Theatre, Peterborough Town Hall, Gladstone Hall, Clare Town Hall
1976	Cowboys #2		Playhouse Adelaide
1976	Old King Cole	Faz	Playhouse Adelaide
1977	Revenge	Adam Hepple	Sheridan Theatre, Adelaide
1977	The Club	Ted	Russell Street Theatre with Melbourne Theatre Company
1977	Cop Out	Linton Doyle	Russell Street Theatre
1979	Thérèse Raquin	Laurent	ABC Radio Melbourne
1979	Paradise Disdained	Commisar	ABC Radio Melbourne
1978	Mixed Doubles		Stables Theatre
1979	Resting Place		Stables Theatre
1979	Night		Stables Theatre
1979	The Lawyer		Stables Theatre
1979	The Vicar		Stables Theatre
1979	Dirty Linen	McTeazle, M.P.	Playbox Theatre, Melbourne
1979	America Hurrah		Stables Theatre
1980	The Seagull	Trigorin	Monash University
1980	Piaf	Leplee	Comedy Theatre, Melbourne
1983	Antony and Cleopatra	Mark Antony	Playbox Theatre, Melbourne
1984	A Fortunate Life		Playhouse, Melbourne
1984	Pax Americana		Playhouse, Melbourne
1984	The Curse of the Werewolf		Playhouse, Melbourne
1985	Visions		Russell Street Theatre
1985	A Midsummer Night's Dream	Theseus / Oberon	Sidney Myer Music Bowl
1985	Glengarry Glen Ross		Russell Street Theatre
1985	Benefactors		Russell Street Theatre
1987	Shimada		Russell Street Theatre
1987	Twelfth Night	Orsino	Playhouse, Melbourne
1987–88	The Rivers of China	Gurdjieff	Wharf Theatre, Playhouse, Melbourne
1987	The Three Musketeers	Athos	Playhouse, Melbourne
1988	Tristram Shandy – Gent	Dr Slop / Samson / German Scholar	Russell Street Theatre with Melbourne Theatre Company
1988	Serious Money		Russell Street Theatre, Wharf Theatre
1988	The Proposal		Russell Street Theatre
1988	A Respectable Wedding		Russell Street Theatre
1989	Mother Courage		Bridge Theatre, Coniston
1989	Macbeth		Playhouse, Melbourne
1989	Dreams in an Empty City		Playhouse, Melbourne
1989	Burn This	Pale	Russell Street Theatre
1990	The Tempest		Playhouse, Melbourne
1990	A Christmas Carol		Russell Street Theatre
1991	The Crucible		Playhouse, Melbourne
1991	Uncle Vanya		Russell Street Theatre
1991	The Cherry Orchard		University of Wollongong
1992	Othello		Playhouse, Melbourne
1992	A View from the Bridge	Eddie Carbone	Playhouse, Melbourne with Melbourne Theatre Company
1992–93	Death and the Maiden	Roberto	Wharf Theatre, Russell Street Theatre, Playhouse Theatre Perth, Space Theatre, Adelaide, Sydney Opera House
1994	Someone Who'll Watch Over Me	Edward	Russell Street Theatre, West Gippsland Arts Centre, Geelong Performing Arts Centre, Monash University with Melbourne Theatre Company
1994	The Lady from the Sea		Russell Street Theatre
1994	A Flea in Her Ear		Playhouse, Melbourne
1995	Arcadia		Playhouse, Melbourne
1996	Skylight		Cremorne Theatre, West Gippsland Arts Centre, Monash University, Space Theatre, Adelaide, The Capital - Bendigo's Performing Arts Centre, Geelong Performing Arts Centre
1996	Miss Bosnia	General Jaz	Fairfax Studio, Melbourne, West Gippsland Arts Centre, Monash University, Canberra Theatre, The Capital - Bendigo's Performing Arts Centre, Geelong Performing Arts Centre, Gold Coast Arts Centre with Melbourne Theatre Company
1997	Dealer's Choice		Fairfax Studio, Melbourne
1997	Wait Until Dark	Roat	Playhouse, Melbourne with Melbourne Theatre Company
1998	A Doll's House		Fairfax Studio, Melbourne
1998	The Piccadilly Bushman	Mick O'Shea	Malthouse Theatre
1999	The Talented Mr. Ripley	Herbert Greenleaf	Fairfax Studio, Melbourne with Melbourne Theatre Company
1999	The Resistible Rise of Arturo Ui	Arturo	Playhouse, Melbourne
2000	Death of a Salesman	Willy Loman	Fairfax Studio, Melbourne with Melbourne Theatre Company
2001	Holy Day	Wakefield	Dunstan Playhouse, Malthouse Theatre
2002	The Cosmonaut's Last Message to the Woman He Once Loved in the Former Soviet Union		Belvoir Street Theatre
2002	Proof	Robert	Playhouse, Melbourne with Melbourne Theatre Company
2003–04	Frozen	Ralph	Fairfax Studio, Melbourne, Wharf 1 Theatre with Sydney Theatre Company
2003	The Lieutenant of Inishmore	Donny	Belvoir Street Theatre
2004	A Number		Space Theatre, Adelaide, Brisbane Powerhouse
2005	King Lear	Lear	Malthouse Theatre with Melbourne Theatre Company
2008	The Soldier's Tale		Sacred Heart Chapel, Melbourne

=== As director ===
Year	Title	Role	Notes
1986	Glengarry Glen Ross	Director	Sydney Opera House
1989	The Chocolate Frog and The Old Familiar Juice	Director	Church Theatre, Hawthorn
1991	A Royal Commission into the Australian Economy	Director	Universal Theatre, Space Theatre, Adelaide
1991	Sunday Lunch	Director	Russell Street Theatre
1998	I Do! I Do!	Director	Capers Cabaret, Hawthorn

== Personal life ==
Gallacher was married to wife Belinda, and had two children, Conor and Brigid, and a sister Eileen.

== Death ==
Gallacher died suddenly and unexpectedly in a Melbourne hospital on 23 February 2009, at the age of 65.
