= Alan Gould =

Australian novelist and poet

- Born: 22 March 1949 (age 77); London, England
- Occupations: Novelist, essayist and poet
- Writing career
- Language: English
- Years active: 1974-
- Notable awards: Kenneth Slessor Prize for Poetry 1981 winner; Grace Leven Prize for Poetry 2006 winner

Alan Gould (born 22 March 1949) is a contemporary Australian novelist, essayist and poet.

== Life and career ==
Gould was born in London to an English father and an Icelandic mother. His family lived in Northern Ireland, Germany and Singapore before arriving in Australia in 1966. He completed a BA at the Australian National University and a Diploma of Education at the then Canberra College of Advanced Education. Having worked as a nuclear physics technician and agricultural labourer, he began writing full-time in 1973, occasionally teaching and writing journalism.

Gould's first book of poems, Icelandic Solitaries, was published in 1978. Numerous volumes of poetry and fiction have followed, with his best known novel being To the Burning City (1991), about the relationship between two brothers, set in World War II. His work has been awarded the Kenneth Slessor Prize for Poetry (1981), the Foundation for Australian Literary Studies Best Book of the Year Award (1985), the National Book Council Banjo Award for Fiction (1992), the Royal Blind Society Audio Book of the Year Award (1999), the Philip Hodgins Memorial Award for contribution to Australian Literature (1999), and the Grace Leven Award For Poetry (2006 for The Past Completes Me - Selected Poems 1973-2003). His novel, The Schoonermaster's Dance, was joint winner of the ACT Book of the Year.

Later books include a novel, The Lakewoman, from Australian Scholarly Publishing, and a collection of poems, Folk Tunes, from Salt Publishing, both in 2009. The Lakewoman was shortlisted for the 2010 Prime Minister's Literary Awards. The Seaglass Spiral was published in 2012 by Finlay Lloyd, and in 2013 appeared a collection of poems and a comic opera libretto, Capital from Puncher & Wattmann, and a collection of essays, Joinery and Scrollwork: A Writer's Workbench from Quadrant Books.

In 2015 he published a picaresque novel, The Poet's Stairwell, Black Pepper publishing.

== Bibliography ==
=== Poetry ===
Collections

- The Skald Mosaic : A Sequence of Poems (1975)
- Icelandic Solitaries (1978)
- Astral Sea (1981)
- The Pausing of the Hours (1984)
- The Twofold Place (1986)
- Years Found in Likeness (1988)
- Formerlight : Selected Poems (1992)
- Momentum (1992)
- Mermaid : Poems and Illustrations (1996)
- Dalliance and Scorn (1999)
- A Fold in the Light (2001)
- The Past Completes Me: Selected Poems 1973-2003 (2005)
- Folk Tunes (2009)
- Capital (2013)
- Charlie Twirl : Sixty-One New Poems (2017)

Selected list of poems

| Title | Year | First published | Reprinted/collected |
|---|---|---|---|
| A Sixties poem | 1996 | Gould, Alan (July–August 1996). "A Sixties poem". Quadrant. 40 (7–8): 20. | |

=== Novels ===
- The Man Who Stayed Below (1984)
- To the Burning City (1991)
- Close Ups (1994)
- The Tazyrik Year (1998)
- The Schoonermaster's Dance (2001)
- The Lake Woman (2009)
- The Seaglass Spiral (2012)
- The Poet's Stairwell (2015)

=== Short fiction ===
Collections

- The Enduring Disguises: Three novellas (1988)

Stories

| Title | Year | First published | Reprinted/collected | Notes |
|---|---|---|---|---|
| The Webley | 1995 | Gould, Alan (December 1995). "The Webley". Quadrant. 39 (12): 72–74. | | |

=== Non-fiction ===
- Three Streets in Search of an Author (1993)
- The Totem Ship (1996)
- Joinery and Scrollwork (2013)
- Gould, Alan (January–February 2016). "Short takes XIX (from a journal)". Quadrant. 60 (1–2): 120–122.
- — (January–February 2018). "Immoderate reactions : on Much ado about nothing". Quadrant. 62 (1–2 [543]): 104–107.

== Awards ==
- Kenneth Slessor Prize for Poetry 1981 winner for Astral Sea
- Miles Franklin Award 1992 shortlisted for To the Burning City
- Grace Leven Prize for Poetry 2006 winner for The Past Completes Me : Selected Poems 1973-2003
- Prime Minister's Literary Awards - Fiction 2010 shortlisted for The Lake Woman
