= The Young Lion =

2013 novel by Blanche d'Alpuget

- Author: Blanche d'Alpuget
- Language: English
- Series: Birth of the Plantagenets
- Genre: Romance, historical novel
- Publisher: HarperCollins
- Publication date: 2013
- Publication place: Australia
- Pages: 484 pp (paperback)
- ISBN: 9781743098745 (paperback)
- Followed by: The Lion Rampant

The Young Lion is a 2013 historical novel by Blanche d'Alpuget. It is set in the 12th century and is the first in a future quartet about the Plantagenet dynasty which reigned in the Middle Ages. The book tells the story of Eleanor of Aquitaine and the restless and bold Henry Plantagenet, who later became Henry II of England.

== Plot summary ==
The story begins with the return of Eleanor of Aquitaine from the Crusades with her monkish husband, Louis of France. She begins an affair with Geoffrey, Duke of Normandy, who has a secret motive to make her his spy in the French court.

Although Geoffrey has ulterior intents, their affair becomes passionate. He remains, however, committed to his goal of ensuring that his son Henry becomes King of England. The relationship between Eleanor and Henry begins badly, and Henry falls in love with Eleanor's dazzling Byzantine maid. The maid would be unsuitable as queen if Henry should assume the English throne.

These complex relationships and intrigues are the basis of this story which is set in 12th century France, a century characterised by the flowering of troubadour culture, mysticism, and learning.

== Reviews ==
The book received favourable reviews, with Books and Publishing, a literary magazine, reporting that:

Blanche d’Alpuget's first historical fiction novel comes as a breath of fresh air as she introduces readers to Henry II and the beginning of the House of Plantagenet. D'Alpuget offers readers a well-researched history of her subject, which of course incorporates the required affairs, plots and intrigues that we have come to expect from any historical novel about royalty and life at court.

A review published in The Australian commented:

D'Alpuget has chosen a fascinating, complex period of history to tackle, and there is a great deal of material within the House of Plantagenet to feed this quartet. The landscape of The Young Lion is evocative... Despite this, d'Alpuget avoids relying on the overt cliche. The period is well researched and she has no qualms about showing violence and the seedier side of sex, power and politics.
