= Dallas Doll =

- Directed by: Ann Turner
- Written by: Ann Turner
- Produced by: Ray Brown; Penny Chapman
- Starring: Sandra Bernhard; Victoria Longley; Celia Ireland; Rose Byrne; David Ngoombujarra; Roy Billing; Frank Gallacher
- Cinematography: Paul Murphy
- Edited by: Michael Honey
- Release date: 1994
- Running time: 104 minutes
- Country: Australia
- Language: English

Dallas Doll is a 1994 Australian black comedy-drama film written and directed by Ann Turner. It stars Sandra Bernhard, David Ngoombujarra, Roy Billing, Victoria Longley, Frank Gallacher, Jake Blundell, Rose Byrne, and Celia Ireland.

== Plot ==
Dallas Adair is an American consultant brought to Australia to advise on a new golf course project. On the plane from L.A. she meets Charlie Sommers, the 18-year-old son of one of her bosses when there's a near crash landing, after which Dallas moves into the Sommers bourgeois home. While living with the Sommers, Dallas begins a twisted odyssey to seduce and corrupt the family which includes seducing Charlie, then seducing his father Stephen, a workaholic lawyer who is re-awakened by sexual desire. Dallas even seduces Stephen's frustrated wife Rosalind, where Dallas introduces Rosalind to excitement of living on edge and the female body. Only the Sommer's UFO obsessed teenage daughter Rastus, along with her pet dog Argus, are highly suspicious to Dallas's agenda. Her influence over the Sommers family secured, Dallas begins to chart her final objective by appealing to the local Mayor Tonkin, for assistance in setting up the golf links with her wicked charms. However, fate and destiny finally catches up to Dallas when Charlie returns from his lone spiritual quest in the desert with old scores to settle where he, Argus and a spectacular visitation conspire to cause the downfall and death of Dallas Adair.

== Cast ==
- Sandra Bernhard as Dallas Adair
- David Ngoombujarra as Storyteller
- Roy Billing as Dave Harry
- Victoria Longley as Rosalind Sommers
- Frank Gallacher as Stephen Sommers
- Jake Blundell as Charlie Sommers
- Rose Byrne as Rastus Sommers
- Douglas Hedge as Mayor Tonkin
- Celia Ireland as Policewoman
- John Frawley

== Production ==
Shot in April and May 1993, the film was developed with the assistance of the Australian Film Commission and made with money from the FFC. Sandra Bernhard was imported to play the lead.

Ann Turner:

"Dallas Doll" essentially came from being part of and seeing how Australians really worship experts from overseas. I've done some writing workshops where that would happen. An American is brought out – and the willingness for Australians to accept with open arms whatever fraud comes out because they're American, that's absolutely the starting point of Dallas Doll.

== Reception ==
The film was released theatrically in 1994 in the United Kingdom and Germany, received mixed reviews. It was released in the United States on 23 June 1995 and had a limited theatrical run.
