= Irresistible (2006 film) =

- Promotional poster
- Directed by: Ann Turner
- Written by: Ann Turner
- Produced by: Tatiana Kennedy; David Parker
- Starring: Susan Sarandon; Sam Neill; Emily Blunt
- Cinematography: Martin McGrath
- Edited by: Ken Sallows
- Music by: David Hirschfelder
- Production companies: Baker Street; Film Finance; Film Victoria
- Distributed by: First Look International (USA DVD); Palace (Australia)
- Release dates: 18 April 2006 (USA); 12 October 2006 (Australia)
- Running time: 103 minutes
- Country: Australia
- Language: English

Irresistible is a 2006 Australian mystery drama film written and directed by Ann Turner and starring Susan Sarandon, Sam Neill, and Emily Blunt. Sophie is an American book illustrator and her family is disrupted by her husband's new co-worker, Mara. Sophie is made to look crazy by the activities of Mara.

== Plot ==
Sophie Hartley is a happily married book illustrator with two young daughters, Ruby and Elly. One afternoon while walking home from school, she suddenly remembers she forgot to turn the iron off and rushes home. When she gets there, she finds the iron still hot but switched off. Later, she senses someone in the house but shrugs it off.

Sophie attends a party with her husband Craig and meets his new co-worker, Mara. They go for a walk along the beach, where Mara offers Sophie sympathy for her mother's recent passing, telling her she lost her best friend Kate who had been an aid worker looking after orphans in Kosovo. She tells Sophie that someone threw a Molotov cocktail through the window of the orphanage, and Kate burned to death trying to save the babies.

Over the weeks that follow, certain items appear to go missing from the house including one of Sophie's dresses and Elly's favourite toy. Sophie also finds one of her paintings destroyed but assumes the cat knocked over an inkwell, and she is later attacked by a swarm of wasps that appear out of an ornament in her studio. After seeing Mara wearing the missing dress, she comes to suspect that Mara is breaking into the house. She breaks into Mara's to collect proof, but gets caught and is given a restraining order. Craig does not back up Sophie in court.

Sophie suspects Craig may be having an affair with Mara but he is quick to deny it. She later goes to a friend's cabin to spend time apart from her family and clear her mind. During a conversation with her father, it is revealed that Sophie became pregnant at the age of 18 before she met Craig, and the baby was surrendered to an orphanage against her wishes.

Upon returning home, Sophie discovers her cat is missing. Suspecting Mara is behind it, she breaks into Mara's house again; she finds the cat but the alarm goes off. Sophie hides in the basement where she finds Elly's toy and family photos with her face cut out of them, and realises her suspicions of Mara were correct. She also finds a birth certificate and a letter from an adoption agency addressed to Mara, informing her that, despite her request, her biological mother did not wish to make contact with her. Sophie comes to believe that Mara was the baby she gave up.

Meanwhile at the office, Mara attempts to seduce Craig but they are interrupted by a phone call from the school who say Sophie has forgotten to pick up the children. Mara offers to get them and takes them back to her house where Sophie is trying to escape via the air ducts. Mara discovers her and confronts Sophie in the basement. Sophie reveals she knows she is her mother and apologies for giving her up. Mara strikes Sophie then smashes a bottle of spirits on the floor, dropping a lit match and setting the basement on fire. A struggle ensues and Mara catches fire, but Sophie helps her to leave the house safely.

In the hospital, Craig is given the contents of his wife's pockets. Among them is the birth certificate and letter from the adoption agency. When Sophie wakes up, Craig tells her he knows about Mara, and they resolve to make their relationship work. Later, Sophie visits Mara in her hospital room; she tells Mara she was brave to try to meet her and asks for forgiveness. They finally embrace as Mara weeps, apparently now forging a true mother-daughter bond. When the nurse tells Sophie she can't be there, she replies, "I'm her mother."

While Mara continues to recover at home, she pores over old news clippings and photos of Kate. There is a photo of Mara and Kate together as children in the orphanage, and we see that Kate looked just like Elly does now. In another photo of them as adults in Kosovo, it appears Kate grew up to be the spitting image of Sophie, revealing that Sophie is actually not Mara's mother but Kate's. Mara angrily cuts out Ruby's face from a family photo and replaces it with her own. The caption written in the scrapbook reads "Mother and Me".

== Cast ==
- Susan Sarandon as Sophie Hartley
- Sam Neill as Craig Hartley
- Emily Blunt as Mara
- Charles 'Bud' Tingwell as Sam
- William McInnes as Jimmy
- Georgie Parker as Jen
- Terry Norris as Magistrate
- Joanna Hunt-Prokhovnik as Elly
- Lauren Mikkor as Ruby
- Heather Mitchell as Rina
- Jill Forster as Helen
- Joelene Crnogorac as Anastasia
- Geneviève Picot as Mara's Nurse
- Carolyn Bock as Sophie's Nurse
- Alethea McGrath as Maggie
- Ryan Hargreaves as young boy on the beach

== Production ==
Producer Sue Maslin executive produced the film.

It was written and directed by Ann Turner, and produced by Tatiana Kennedy and David Parker.

Martin McGrath was cinematographer, and the music was composed by David Hirschfelder. Ken Sallows edited the film.

== Release ==
Irresistible had its world premiere in the US on 18 April 2006, and was released in Australia on 12 October 2006.
