= Blanche d'Alpuget =

Australian writer and activist (1944–2026)

- d'Alpuget in 2012
- Born: Josephine Blanche d'Alpuget; 3 January 1944; Sydney, New South Wales, Australia
- Died: 8 September 2026 (aged 82); Sydney, New South Wales, Australia
- Education: SCEGGS Darlinghurst; University of Sydney
- Occupations: Biographer; novelist; activist
- Spouses: Tony Pratt (m. 1965; div. 1986) Bob Hawke (m. 1995; died 2019)
- Children: 1
- Writing career
- Years active: 1973–2026
- Genres: Biography; drama; romance
- Notable works: Mediator; Robert J. Hawke, A Biography; Turtle Beach; the Young Lion
- Website: www.blanchedalpuget.com

Josephine Blanche d'Alpuget (3 January 1944 – 8 September 2026) was an Australian writer, activist, and the second wife of Bob Hawke, a former Prime Minister of Australia.

== Early life and education ==
D'Alpuget was the only child of Josephine Curgenven and Louis Albert Poincaré d'Alpuget (1915–2006), journalist, author, blue water yachtsman and champion boxer. Her great-aunt, Blanche d'Alpuget, after whom she was named, was a pioneer woman journalist in Sydney and a patron of artists. Her father was a sports and feature writer and also news editor of a Sydney newspaper, The Sun.

She attended SCEGGS Darlinghurst and briefly the University of Sydney. She worked at The Sun's rival newspaper, The Daily Mirror, then moved to Indonesia at the age of 22 with her first husband, Tony Pratt, whom she had married in 1965. She and Pratt had a son, Louis, who is an artist and sculptor and a co-founder of Mungo, a Sydney artists' colony. While in Indonesia, d'Alpuget worked in the Australian Embassy's news and information bureau; later she was a volunteer worker in the National Museum of Indonesia, leading a team that recatalogued the oriental ceramic collection of Chinese export ware. She was the world's youngest member of the famous English-founded Oriental Ceramic Society. After spending four years in Indonesia, d'Alpuget lived for a year in Malaysia. She travelled widely, and to remote areas, in both countries.

== Writing career ==
In 1973 d'Alpuget returned to Australia and became active in the women's movement. She began writing in 1974, inspired by her experiences in South East Asia; she won a number of literary awards for both fiction and non-fiction including, in 1987, the inaugural Australasian Prize for Commonwealth Literature. d'Alpuget first met Bob Hawke in Jakarta, in 1970. They met again in 1976 when she interviewed him for a biography she was writing on Sir Richard Kirby. This meeting led to a long and sporadic love affair which culminated in their marriage in 1995. D'Alpuget and Pratt had divorced in 1986. Between 1980 and 1982 d'Alpuget researched and wrote a biography of Hawke.

In 1995 d'Alpuget joined the board of Robert J. Hawke & Associates, a business consultancy primarily focused on China. For fifteen years she abandoned her career as a writer and travelled the world with her new husband, visiting not only capital cities but remote areas of China such as Inner Mongolia, as well as Moldova, Easter Island, Palau, Kazakhstan, the North West Frontier of Pakistan and the Antarctic peninsula. She returned to writing in 2008.

== Later life and death ==
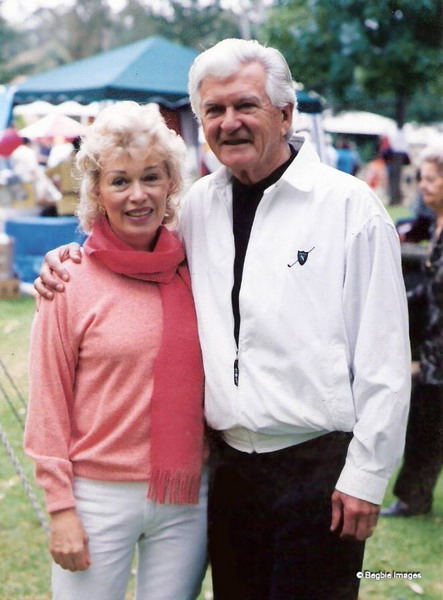
D'Alpuget with Bob Hawke in 2006

In 2013 d'Alpuget released The Young Lion, the first novel of a quintet. Set in the 12th century, the novel is about the birth of the House of Plantagenet and focuses on Henry II and his union with Eleanor of Aquitaine, who was Queen of France and subsequently Queen of England. The Young Lion received favourable reviews. Geraldine Doogue said "this is exuberant story-telling history, full of sex, passion and politics" while Stephanie Dowrick noted that "few writers are both earthy and erudite, Blanche d'Alpuget is. Her narrative is so fresh and energetic you will swear she's bringing us a first-hand account." The magazine Books + Publishing made similar comments stating that "Blanche d'Alpuget's first historical fiction novel comes as a breath of fresh air as she introduces readers to Henry II and the beginning of the House of Plantagenet. D'Alpuget offers readers a well-researched history of her subject, which of course incorporates the required affairs, plots and intrigues that we have come to expect from any historical novel about royalty and life at court." The second in the quintet, The Lion Rampant, was published in 2014 to critical acclaim. Thomas Keneally said that "this is fresh and invigorating and absolutely gripping. The revision she provides of the motives and character of Thomas Becket will rivet readers as they have not been riveted since Hilary Mantel's Thomas Cromwell." She completed the third novel in the quintet, The Lions' Torment, in 2015 but held it back from the market until the fourth, The Lioness Wakes, was finished in early 2017. The fifth book in the quintet, The Cubs Roar, was published in 2020.

Hawke died in 2019. D'Alpuget did not publish again until 2025, a crime fiction, The Bunny Club. In November 2025, Allen & Unwin published Fridays with Blanche by Derek Rielly, a memoir of her life.

In the early 1990s d'Alpuget was ambassador for the Australian charity Austcare for war refugees, travelling to Peshawar in Pakistan as well as Vietnam and Croatia. From 2020 to 2024 she was patron of Inala, a Rudolf Steiner organisation catering for people with severe intellectual disabilities.

D'Alpuget died in Sydney on 8 September 2026, aged 82, from complications of influenza.

== Published works ==
Her works include:

- Mediator: a biography of Sir Richard Kirby, Melbourne University Press, 1977, ISBN 978-0-522-84129-9
- Monkeys in the dark, London: Aurora Press, 1980, ISBN 978-0-86748-001-6
- Turtle Beach, 1981
- Robert J. Hawke: a biography, Schwartz, 1982, ISBN 978-0-86753-001-8
- Winter in Jerusalem, Simon and Schuster, 1986, ISBN 978-0-671-49808-5
- Lust (an essay, 1992)
- White eye, Penguin Books, 1993, ISBN 978-0-670-84812-6
- On longing, Melbourne University Publishing, 2008, ISBN 978-0-522-85517-3
- Hawke: the Prime Minister, Melbourne University Press, 2010, ISBN 978-0-522-85670-5
- The Young Lion, HarperCollins Publishers Australia, 2013, ISBN 978-0-7322-9669-8
- The Lion Rampant, Third Advent, 2014, ISBN 978-0-9925273-1-0
- The Lions' Torment, Ventura Press, 2019, ISBN 978-1-9253-8480-2
- The Lioness Wakes, Ventura Press, 2020, ISBN 978-1-9253-8480-2
- The Cubs Roar, Ventura Press, 2020, ISBN 978-1-9253-8480-2
- The Bunny Club. Popcorn Press. 2025. ISBN 978-1-923236-19-6.

=== Film adaptations ===
- Turtle Beach was made into a feature film in 1989 featuring Greta Scacchi and Jack Thompson.
- Hawke is a 2010 biographical telemovie about the former Prime Minister of Australia, Bob Hawke. In the movie, d'Alpuget is played by leading Australian actress Asher Keddie, with Hawke played by Richard Roxburgh.

== Achievements and awards ==
Included in awards are:

- 1980 – Sydney PEN Golden Jubilee award for Fiction
- 1981 – NSW Premier's Award for Non-Fiction
- 1982 and 1983 – Braille Book of the Year Award
- 1982 – The Age Novel of the Year Award for Turtle Beach
- 1982 – South Australian Government's Award for Fiction
- 1987 – Inaugural Commonwealth Award for Literature – Australasian Division
- 1989 – Guest of the Soviet Writers' Union travelling in the USSR
- 2013 – The Young Lion among Best Books of 2013

== See also ==
- D'Alpuget – surname list
