= Sensitive New-Age Killer =

- Directed by: Mark Savage
- Release date: 2001
- Country: Australia
- Language: English
- Box office: A$132,204 (Australia)

Sensitive New Age Killer is a 2001 Australian film directed by Mark Savage. The film was co-written by director Mark Savage and DOP David Richardson.

According to Ozmovies, the FFC provided money to give the film a theatrical release, but is not credited on all versions of the film. Where it is credited it is a tail credit that says it was "marketed with the financial assistance of the Film Finance Corporation."
