= 2010 Australian Film Institute Awards =

Award for Australian films

52nd Australian Film Institute Awards
- Date: Saturday, 11 December 2010
- Site: Regent Theatre; Melbourne, Victoria
- Hosted by: Shane Jacobson

Highlights
- Best Film: Animal Kingdom
- Most awards: Animal Kingdom (10)
- Most nominations: Animal Kingdom (18)

Television coverage
- Network: Nine Network
- Viewership: 270,000

The 52nd Annual Australian Film Institute Awards ceremony, presented by the Australian Film Institute (AFI), honoured the best Australian films of 2010 and took place on 11 December 2010 at the Regent Theatre, in Melbourne, Victoria.

On 27 October 2010, the Australian Film Institute announced the nominees competing for awards in forty-eight categories, including feature film, television, short film and documentaries. Animal Kingdom received eighteen nominations, the most of any film in the awards' history. On the awards night, Animal Kingdom picked up the most awards - ten in total - including Best Film.

== Winners and nominees ==
The nominees were announced on 27 October 2010, at the Sydney Theatre, in Dawes Point, New South Wales, by actors Jacki Weaver, Cate Blanchett, Gyton Grantley and Alex Dimitriades. Animal Kingdom received the most nominations, with eighteen, becoming the most nominated film in the awards history. Animal Kingdom received the most awards, with ten, including Best Film, and Best Direction and Best Original Screenplay for David Michôd. Other feature film winners were Bright Star with three, Tomorrow, When the War Began, with two awards, and Beneath Hill 60 with one. Some of the award categories in film, television, documentary and short film genres, for sound, editing, cinematography, music and television programs, were presented one day prior to the awards ceremony.

=== Feature film ===
Winners are listed first and highlighted in boldface.

Best Film	Best Direction
**Animal Kingdom – Liz Watts**; Beneath Hill 60 – Bill Leimbach; Bran Nue Dae – Robyn Kershaw and Graeme Isaac; Bright Star – Jan Chapman and Caroline Hewitt; The Tree – Sue Taylor and Yaël Fogiel; Tomorrow, When the War Began – Andrew Mason, Michael Boughen	**David Michôd – Animal Kingdom**; Jeremy Hartley Sims – Beneath Hill 60; Jane Campion – Bright Star; Julie Bertuccelli – The Tree
Best Original Screenplay	Best Adapted Screenplay
**David Michôd – Animal Kingdom**; David Roach – Beneath Hill 60; Jane Campion – Bright Star; Peter and Michael Spierig – Daybreakers	**Stuart Beattie – Tomorrow, When the War Began**; Reg Cribb, Rachel Perkins and Jimmy Chi – Bran Nue Dae; Allan Cubitt – The Boys Are Back; Julie Bertuccelli – The Tree
Best Lead Actor	Best Lead Actress
**Ben Mendelsohn – Animal Kingdom** as Andrew "Pope" Cody; Brendan Cowell – Beneath Hill 60 as Captain Oliver Woodward; James Frecheville – Animal Kingdom as Joshua "J" Cody; Clive Owen – The Boys Are Back as Joe Warr	**Jacki Weaver – Animal Kingdom** as Janine "Smurf" Cody; Abbie Cornish – Bright Star as Fanny Brawne; Morgana Davies – The Tree as Simone; Charlotte Gainsbourg – The Tree as Dawn
Best Supporting Actor	Best Supporting Actress
**Joel Edgerton – Animal Kingdom** as Barry "Baz" Brown; Guy Pearce – Animal Kingdom as Nathan Leckie; Kodi Smit-McPhee – Matching Jack as Finn; Sullivan Stapleton – Animal Kingdom as Craig Cody	**Deborah Mailman – Bran Nue Dae** as Roxanne; Julia Blake – The Boys Are Back as Barbara; Kerry Fox – Bright Star as Mrs. Frances Brawne; Laura Wheelwright – Animal Kingdom as Nicky Henry
Best Cinematography	Best Editing
**Bright Star – Greig Fraser**; Animal Kingdom – Adam Arkapaw; Beneath Hill 60 – Robyn Kershaw and Toby Oliver; The Waiting City – Denson Baker	**Animal Kingdom – Luke Doolan**; Beneath Hill 60 – Dany Cooper; Bright Star – Alexandre de Franceschi; Tomorrow, When the War Began – Marcus D'Arcy
Best Original Music Score	Best Sound
**Animal Kingdom – Antony Partos and Sam Petty**; Beneath Hill 60 – Cezary Skubiszewski; Bran Nue Dae – Cezary Skubiszewski, Jimmy Chi, Patrick Duttoo Bin Amat, Garry Gower, Michael Manolis Mavromatis and Stephen Pigram; Bright Star – Mark Bradshaw	**Tomorrow, When the War Began – Andrew Plain, David Lee, Gethin Creagh and Robert Sullivan**; Animal Kingdom – Sam Petty, Rob Mackenzie, Philippe Decrausaz, Leah Katz, Brooke Trezise and Richard Pain; Beneath Hill 60 – Liam Egan, Alicia Slusarski, Mark Cornish, Tony Murtagh, Robert Sullivan and Mario Vaccaro; Bran Nue Dae – Andrew Neil, Steve Burgess, Peter Mills, Mario Vaccaro, Blaire Slater, David Bridie and Scott Montgomery
Best Production Design	Best Costume Design
**Bright Star – Janet Patterson**; Animal Kingdom – Jo Ford; Beneath Hill 60 – Clayton Jauncey; Tomorrow, When the War Began – Robert Webb, Michelle McGahey, Damien Drew and Bev Dunn	**Bright Star – Janet Patterson**; Animal Kingdom – Cappi Ireland; Beneath Hill 60 – Ian Sparke and Wendy Cork; Bran Nue Dae – Margot Wilson

=== Short film ===
Best Short Fiction Film	Best Screenplay in a Short Film
**The Kiss – Sonya Humphrey and Ashlee Page**; Deeper Than Yesterday – Ariel Kleiman, Benjamin Gilovitz, Sarah Cyngler and Anna Kojevnikov; The Love Song Of Iskra Prufrock – Lucy Gaffy and Lyn Norfor; Suburbia – Antonio Oreña-Barlin and Richard Halsted	**Ariel Kleiman – Deeper Than Yesterday**; Sarah Shaw and Ian Meadows – A Parachute Falling in Siberia; Trent Dalton – Glenn Owen Dodds; Ashlee Page – The Kiss
Best Short Animation	Outstanding Achievement in Short Film Screen Craft
**The Lost Thing – Sophie Byrne, Andrew Ruhemann and Shaun Tan**; Zero – Christopher Kezelos and Christine Kezelos	**The Kiss – Nick Matthews for cinematography**

=== Television ===
Best Drama Series	Best Comedy Series
**Rush** **– Season 3 (Network Ten) John Edwards, Mimi Butler**; Spirited – Series 1 (Foxtel) Claudia Karvan, Jacquelin Perske, John Edwards; Tangle – Season 2 (Showcase) John Edwards, Imogen Banks; The Circuit – Season 2 (SBS) Ross Hutchens, Colin South	**Review with Myles Barlow** **– Season 2 (ABC) Dean Bates**; Lowdown – Series 1 (ABC) Nicole Minchin, Amanda Brotchie, Adam Zwar; Wilfred II – (SBS) Jenny Livingston, Tony Rogers, Adam Zwar, Jason Gann
Best Telefeature, Mini Series or Short Run Series	Best Light Entertainment Series
**Hawke – (Network Ten) Richard Keddie**; A Model Daughter: The Killing Of Caroline Byrne – (Network Ten) Karl Zwicky	**The Gruen Transfer – Series 3 (ABC) Andrew Denton, Anita Jacoby, Jon Casimir, Debbie Cuell**; Hungry Beast – Series 2 (ABC) Andrew Denton, Andy Nehl; MasterChef Australia – Series 2 (Network Ten) Margaret Bashfield, Judy Smart, Caroline Spencer; Talkin' 'Bout Your Generation – Series 2 (Network Ten) Peter Beck
Best Children's Television Series	Best Comedy Performance
**My Place – Series 1 (ABC) Penny Chapman**; Dance Academy – Series 1 (ABC) Joanna Werner; Dead Gorgeous – (ABC) Ewan Burnett, Margot McDonald; Lockie Leonard – Series 2 (Nine Network) Kylie Du Fresne	**Phil Lloyd – Review with Myles Barlow: Season 2 (ABC)**; Paul Denny – Lowdown: Series 1 (ABC); Jason Gann – Wilfred II (SBS)
Best Lead Actor – Drama	Best Lead Actress – Drama
**Richard Roxburgh – Hawke (Network Ten)**; Garry McDonald – A Model Daughter: The Killing Of Caroline Byrne (Network Ten); Corey McKernan – The Legend of Enyo (Seven Network); Aaron Pederson – The Circuit: Series 2 (SBS)	**Catherine McClements – Tangle: Season 2 (Showcase)**; Poppy Lee Friar – Dead Gorgeous (ABC); Justine Clarke – Tangle: Season 2 (Showcase); Cheree Cassidy – Underbelly: The Golden Mile - Episode 7: "Full Force Gale" (Nine Network)
Best Guest or Supporting Actor – Drama	Best Guest or Supporting Actress – Drama
**Damien Garvey – Underbelly: The Golden Mile - Episode 10: "Hurt On Duty" (Nine Network)**; Rhys Muldoon – Lockie Leonhard: Series 2, Episode 11: "Snake Hide Oil" (Nine Network); Ben Winspear – My Place: Series 1, Episode 5: "1968 Sofia" (ABC); John Waters – Offspring: Series 1 (Network Ten)	**Deborah Mailman – Offspring: Series 1 (Network Ten)**; Asher Keddie – Hawke (Network Ten); Sacha Horler – Hawke (Network Ten); Linda Cropper – Satisfaction: Series 3, Episode 8: "Not Vanilla" (Showcase)
Best Direction	Best Screenplay
**Hawke** **– (Network Ten) Emma Freeman**; Dance Academy – Episode 2: "Week Zero" (ABC) Jeffrey Walker; **Rush** – Season 3, Episode 8: "Train" (Network Ten) Grant Brown; Tangle – Season 2, Episode 16: "Lost And Found" (Showcase) Emma Freeman	**Wilfred II – Episode 7: "Dogstar" (SBS) Jason Gann, Adam Zwar**; Hawke – (Network Ten) Glen Dolman; Tangle – Season 2, Episode 15: "Sleepwalking" (Showcase) Fiona Seres; Review with Myles Barlow – Season 2, Episode 6: "Happiness, Escapism, Acceptance" (ABC) Trent O'Donnell, Phil Lloyd
Best Children’s Television Animation	Outstanding Achievement in Television Screen Craft
**dirtgirlworld – (ABC) Cate McQuillen**; Erky Perky – (Seven Network) Kristine Klohk, Barbara Stephen, Tracy Lenon, David Webster; The Legend of Enyo – (Seven Network) Avrill Stark, Michael Christensen	**Talkin' 'Bout Your Generation – Series 2 (Network Ten) Shaun Micallef**

=== Documentary ===
Best Feature Length Documentary	Best Documentary Under One Hour
**Contact – Martin Butler and Bentley Dean**; Inside the Firestorm – Lucy Maclaren and Alex West; The Snowman – Rachel Landers and Dylan Blowen; Strange Birds In Paradise - A West Papuan Story – Jamie Nicolai and John Cherry	**You Only Live Twice - The Incredibly True Story Of The Hughes Family – Ruth Cullen**; A Thousand Encores: The Ballets Russes In Australia – Dave Morley, Felix Crawshaw, Claudia Lecaros and Tim Walker; Rudely Interrupted – Susie Jones and Benjamin Jones; Surviving Mumbai – Andrew Ogilvie and Andrea Quesnelle
Best Documentary Series	Best Direction in a Documentary
**Liberal Rule - The Politics That Changed Australia – Nick Torrens and Frank Haines**; Addicted To Money – Andrew Ogilvie and Andrea Quesnelle; Disable Bodied Sailors – Karina Holden and Nick Robinson; Kokoda – Andrew Wiseman	**Jacob Hickey – Inside the Firestorm**; Amanda Chang – A Thousand Encores: The Ballets Russes In Australia; Martin Butler and Bentley Dean – Contact; Charlie Hill-Smith – Strange Birds In Paradise - A West Papuan Story
Best Cinematography in a Documentary	Best Editing in a Documentary
**Miracles – Toby Oliver** for Episode 1: "Miracle in the Storm"; Disable Bodied Sailors – Nick Robinson for "Episode 3"; Strange Birds In Paradise - A West Papuan Story – Angus Kemp; Surviving Mumbai – Jim Frater	**Inside the Firestorm – Steven Robinson**; A Thousand Encores: The Ballets Russes In Australia – Karin Steininger; Contact – Tania Nehme; Surviving Mumbai – David Fosdick
Best Sound in a Documentary
**Inside the Firestorm – Jock Healy, Tristan Meredith and AJ Bradford**; A Thousand Encores: The Ballets Russes In Australia – Brett Aplin, Andrew McGrath, Erin McKimm and Terry Chadwick; Kokoda – David Bridie, Chris Goodes, Ian Grant and Patrick Slater for Episode 1: "The Invasion"; Strange Birds In Paradise - A West Papuan Story – Mik la Vage, Doron Kipen and David Bridie

=== Additional awards ===
AFI Members' Choice Award	Readers' Choice Award
**Animal Kingdom – Liz Watts**; Beneath Hill 60 – Bill Leimbach; Bran Nue Dae – Robyn Kershaw and Graeme Isaac; Bright Star – Jan Chapman and Caroline Hewitt; The Tree – Sue Taylor and Yaël Fogiel; Tomorrow, When the War Began – Andrew Mason, Michael Boughen	**Animal Kingdom – Liz Watts**; Bran Nue Dae – Robyn Kershaw and Graeme Isaac; Wog Boy 2: Kings of Mykonos – Nick Giannopoulos and Emile Sherman; Legend of the Guardians: The Owls of Ga'Hoole – Zareh Nalbandian; Tomorrow, When the War Began – Andrew Mason, Michael Boughen
Best Young Actor	Best Visual Effects
**Harrison Gilbertson – Beneath Hill 60** as Frank Tiffin; Ashleigh Cummings – Tomorrow, When the War Began as Robyn Mathers; Morgana Davies – The Tree as Simone; James Frecheville – Animal Kingdom as Joshua "J" Cody	**Daybreakers – Peter and Michael Spierig, Rangi Sutton, James Rogers and Randy Vellacott**; The Tree – Dave Morley, Felix Crawshaw, Claudia Lecaros and Tim Walker; Tinglewood – Wil Manning; Tomorrow, When the War Began – Chris Godfrey, Sigi Eimutis, Dave Morley and Tony Cole
International Award for Best Actor	International Award for Best Actress
**Sam Worthington – Avatar** as Jake Sully; Simon Baker – The Mentalist, Season 2 as Patrick Jane; Ryan Kwanten – True Blood, Season 3 as Jason Stackhouse; Kodi Smit-McPhee – The Road as Boy	**Mia Wasikowska – Alice in Wonderland** as Alice Kingsleigh; Toni Collette – United States of Tara, Season 2 as Tara Gregson; Bojana Novakovic – Edge of Darkness as Emma Charlotte Craven; Naomi Watts – Mother and Child as Elizabeth

=== Special awards ===
Raymond Longford Award	Byron Kennedy Award
**Reg Grundy**	**Animal Logic**

== Productions with multiple nominations ==
=== Feature film ===
The following feature films received multiple nominations.

- Eighteen: Animal Kingdom
- Twelve: Beneath Hill 60
- Eleven: Bright Star
- Eight: Tomorrow When The War Began
- Seven: Bran Nue Dae and The Tree
- Four: The Boys Are Back
- Two: Daybreakers

The following feature films received multiple awards.

- Eleven: Animal Kingdom
- Three: Bright Star
- Two: Tomorrow When The War Began

=== Television ===
The following television shows received multiple nominations.

- Six: Hawke
- Five: Tangle
- Two: The Circuit, Rush, Offspring, A Model Daughter: The Killing of Caroline Byrne and Underbelly: The Golden Mile

The following television shows and documentaries received multiple awards.

- Three: Hawke and Inside the Firestorm
- Two: Review with Myles Barlow

== See also ==
- AACTA Awards
