= Tangle season 2 =

Tangle
- Season 2
- Region 4 DVD
- Starring: Justine Clarke; Kat Stewart; Catherine McClements
- No. of episodes: 6

Release
- Original network: Showcase
- Original release: 20 July – 24 August 2010

Season chronology
- ← Previous; Season 1 Next → Season 3

The second season of Tangle, an Australian drama television series, began airing on 20 July 2010 on Showcase. The season consists of 6 episodes and concluded on 24 August.

The season was released on DVD as a two disc set under the title of Tangle: Series 2 on 18 November 2010.

== Cast ==
=== Regular ===
- Justine Clarke as Ally Kovac
- Kat Stewart as Nat Manning
- Catherine McClements as Christine Williams
- Joel Tobeck as Tim Williams
- Matt Day as Gabriel Lucas
- Don Hany as Spiros Georgiades
- Blake Davis as Max Williams
- Lincoln Younes as Romeo Kovac
- Eva Lazzaro as Gigi Kovac
- Kick Gurry as Joe Kovac

=== Recurring and guest ===
- Tony Rickards as Billy Hall
- Reef Ireland as Ned Dougherty
- Madeleine Jay as Kelly
- Georgia Flood as Charlotte Barker
- Alison Whyte as Nicky Barnham
- Kate Jenkinson as Melanie
- Maude Davey as Agatha
- Tony Nikolakopoulos as Gordon
- Fiona Harris as Sophie
- Ryan Corr as Isaac
- Marta Kaczmarek as Psychic
- Tim Draxl as Conrad
- Adam Zwar as Huey
- Leah Vandenberg as Elle
- Jane Allsop as Tanya
- Todd MacDonald as Paul
- Lucia Emmerichs as Ophelia

== Episodes ==
No. overall	No. in season	Title	Directed by	Written by	Original release date
11	1	"Season 2, Episode 1" "Cortège"	Stuart McDonald	Fiona Seres	20 July 2010
12	2	"Season 2, Episode 2" "The Day After"	Stuart McDonald	Tony McNamara	27 July 2010
13	3	"Season 2, Episode 3" "Desire"	Stuart McDonald	Fiona Seres & Judi McCrossin	3 August 2010
14	4	"Season 2, Episode 4" "Fallout"	Emma Freeman	Fiona Seres	10 August 2010
15	5	"Season 2, Episode 5" "Sleepwalking"	Emma Freeman	Fiona Seres	17 August 2010
16	6	"Season 2, Episode 6" "Lost and Found"	Emma Freeman	Judi McCrossin & Fiona Seres	24 August 2010

== Awards and nominations ==
=== Wins ===
- AACTA Award for Best Lead Actress in a Television Drama – Catherine McClements
- ASTRA Award for Most Outstanding Performance by an Actor: Female – Catherine McClements

=== Nominations ===
- AACTA Award for Best Lead Actress in a Television Drama – Justine Clarke
- AACTA Award for Best Television Drama Series – Tangle
- AACTA Award for Best Screenplay in Television – Fiona Seres (episode 5)
- AACTA Award for Best Direction in Television – Emma Freeman (episode 6)
- ASTRA Award for Most Outstanding Drama – Tangle
- ASTRA Award for Most Outstanding Performance by an Actor: Male – Don Hany
- ASTRA Award for Most Outstanding Performance by an Actor: Female – Justine Clarke
- IF 'Out of the Box' Award – Blake Davis
- Logie Award for Most Outstanding Actress – Justine Clarke
- Logie Award for Most Popular Actor – Don Hany
- Screen Music Award for Best Music in a Television Series or Serial – Bryony Marks (episode 6)

== DVD release ==
Title	Release	Region	Discs	Runtime	ACB rating	Distributor	Ref(s)
Single season
Tangle: Series 2	18 November 2010	4	2	303 minutes	MA15+	Roadshow	
Included with complete collection
Tangle: Series 1–3	5 December 2012	4	7	1154 minutes	MA15+	Roadshow	
Tangle: Seasons 1–3 (repackaged)	21 April 2021	4	7	1154 minutes	MA15+	Roadshow	
