= Tangle season 1 =

Tangle
- Season 1
- Region 4 DVD
- Starring: Justine Clarke; Kat Stewart; Catherine McClements
- No. of episodes: 10

Release
- Original network: Showcase
- Original release: 1 October – 26 November 2009

Season chronology
- Next → Season 2

The first season of Tangle, an Australian drama television series, began airing on 1 October 2009 on Showcase. Season one of Tangle explores the intertwined lives of two families, who sometimes connect and sometimes clash as they journey through life together. It consists of 10 episodes and concluded on 26 November 2009.

== Cast ==
=== Regular ===
- Justine Clarke as Ally Kovac
- Kat Stewart as Nat Manning
- Catherine McClements as Christine Williams
- Ben Mendelsohn as Vince Kovac
- Joel Tobeck as Tim Williams
- Matt Day as Gabriel Lucas
- Lucia Mastrantone as Em Barker
- Blake Davis as Max Williams
- Lincoln Younes as Romeo Kovac
- Eva Lazzaro as Gigi Kovac
- Georgia Flood as Charlotte Barker

=== Recurring and guest ===
- Tony Rickards as Billy Hall
- Reef Ireland as Ned Dougherty
- Madeleine Jay as Kelly
- John Brumpton as Bryan Dougherty
- Frank Gallacher as Pat Mahady
- Alicia Banit as Leah
- Simon Maiden as Stan, voice of Yuri
- Alison Whyte as Nicky Barnham
- Luke Hemsworth as John
- Kate Jenkinson as Melanie
- Lliam Amor as Robert Barker
- Maude Davey as Agatha
- Tony Nikolakopoulos as Gordon
- Richard Sutherland as Jason

== Episodes ==
No. overall	No. in season	Title	Directed by	Written by	Original release date
1	1	"Season 1, Episode 1"	Jessica Hobbs	Fiona Seres	1 October 2009
2	2	"Season 1, Episode 2"	Jessica Hobbs	Fiona Seres	1 October 2009
3	3	"Season 1, Episode 3"	Jessica Hobbs	Tony McNamara	8 October 2009
4	4	"Season 1, Episode 4"	Matt Saville	Fiona Seres	15 October 2009
5	5	"Season 1, Episode 5"	Matt Saville	Tony McNamara	22 October 2009
6	6	"Season 1, Episode 6"	Matt Saville	Fiona Seres	29 October 2009
7	7	"Season 1, Episode 7"	Matt Saville	Fiona Seres	5 November 2009
8	8	"Season 1, Episode 8"	Jessica Hobbs	Tony McNamara	12 November 2009
9	9	"Season 1, Episode 9"	Stuart McDonald	Fiona Seres	19 November 2009
10	10	"Season 1, Episode 10"	Stuart McDonald	Fiona Seres & Tony McNamara	26 November 2009

== Awards and nominations ==
=== Wins ===
- ASTRA Award for Most Outstanding Performance By An Actor: Male – Ben Mendelsohn
- ASTRA Award for Most Outstanding Performance By An Actor: Female – Justine Clarke
- ADG Directors Award for Best Direction in a Television Drama Series – Stuart McDonald (episode 9)

=== Nominations ===
- ASTRA Award for Most Outstanding Drama – Tangle
- ASTRA Award for Most Outstanding Performance By An Actor: Male – Matt Day
- ASTRA Award for Most Outstanding Performance By An Actor: Female – Catherine McClements
- ASTRA Award for Best New Talent – Eva Lazzaro
- IF 'Out of the Box' Award – Eva Lazzaro
- Logie Award for Most Outstanding Drama Series, Miniseries or Telemovie – Tangle
- Logie Award for Most Outstanding Actor – Ben Mendelsohn
- Logie Award for Most Outstanding Actress – Justine Clarke
- Logie Award for Most Outstanding Newcomew Talent – Eva Lazzaro
- NSW Premier's Literary Award for Script Writing – Fiona Seres (episode 1)
- Screen Music Award for Best Music in a Television Series or Serial – Briony Marks (episode 1)

== DVD release ==
Title	Release	Region	Discs	Runtime	ACB rating	Distributor	Ref(s)
Single season
Tangle: Series 1	15 April 2010	4	3	534 minutes	M	Roadshow	
Included with complete collection
Tangle: Series 1–3	5 December 2012	4	7	1154 minutes	MA15+	Roadshow	
Tangle: Seasons 1–3 (repackaged)	21 April 2021	4	7	1154 minutes	MA15+	Roadshow	
