= Tangle season 3 =

Tangle
- Season 3
- Region 4 DVD
- Starring: Justine Clarke; Kat Stewart; Catherine McClements
- No. of episodes: 6

Release
- Original network: Showcase
- Original release: 25 March – 29 April 2012

Season chronology
- ← Previous; Season 2

The third and final season of Tangle, an Australian drama television series, premiered on Showcase on 25 March 2012. It consists of 6 episodes and concluded on 29 April 2012.

It was confirmed in December 2010, with production beginning in June 2011 and ended in August. It is written by Fiona Seres and Tony McNamara, and directed by Emma Freeman and Michael James Rowland.

== Cast ==
=== Regular ===
- Justine Clarke as Ally Kovac
- Kat Stewart as Nat Manning
- Catherine McClements as Christine Williams
- Joel Tobeck as Tim Williams
- Matt Day as Gabriel Lucas
- Blake Davis as Max Williams
- Lincoln Younes as Romeo Kovac
- Eva Lazzaro as Gigi Kovac
- Kick Gurry as Joe Kovac

=== Recurring ===
- Jane Allsop as Tanya
- Lucia Emmerichs as Ophelia
- Georgia Flood as Charlotte Barker
- Dan Wyllie as Michael Chubievsky
- Michael Clarke-Tokely as Luke Wintle
- Maude Davey as Agatha
- Tony Rickards as Billy Hall

== Episodes ==
No. overall	No. in season	Title	Directed by	Written by	Original release date
17	1	"Season 3, Episode 1"	Emma Freeman	Fiona Seres	25 March 2012
18	2	"Season 3, Episode 2"	Emma Freeman	Fiona Seres	1 April 2012
19	3	"Season 3, Episode 3"	Emma Freeman	Fiona Seres	8 April 2012
20	4	"Season 3, Episode 4"	Michael James Rowland	Tony McNamara	15 April 2012
21	5	"Season 3, Episode 5"	Michael James Rowland	Fiona Seres	22 April 2012
22	6	"Season 3, Episode 6"	Michael James Rowland	Tony McNamara	29 April 2012

== Awards and nominations ==
=== Wins ===
- AACTA Award for Most Outstanding Drama – Tangle
- ASTRA Award for Most Outstanding Performance By An Actor: Male – Lincoln Younes
- ASTRA Award for Most Outstanding Performance By An Actor: Female – Catherine McClements

=== Nominations ===
- ASTRA Award for Best Television Drama Series – Tangle
- ASTRA Award for Most Outstanding Performance By An Actor: Male – Dan Wyllie
- ASTRA Award for Most Outstanding Performance By An Actor: Female – Justine Clarke
- ASTRA Award for Most Outstanding Performance By An Actor: Female – Eva Lazzaro
- Logie Award for Most Outstanding Drama Series – Tangle
- Logie Award for Most Outstanding Actress – Catherine McClements

== DVD release ==
Title	Release	Region	Discs	Runtime	ACB rating	Distributor	Ref(s)
Single season
Tangle: Series 3	3 October 2012	4	2	317 minutes	MA15+	Roadshow	
Included with complete collection
Tangle: Series 1–3	5 December 2012	4	7	1154 minutes	MA15+	Roadshow	
Tangle: Seasons 1–3 (repackaged)	21 April 2021	4	7	1154 minutes	MA15+	Roadshow	
