= List of Australian television specialty programme premieres in 2010 =

The following is a list of Australian specialty television programmes which have debuted, or are scheduled to debut in 2010.

== Telemovies ==
| Program | Channel | Debut date |
|---|---|---|
| Wicked Love: The Maria Korp Story (formerly known as The Story of Maria Korp) | Nine Network | 28 February |
| Hawke | Network Ten | 18 July |
| Offspring | Network Ten | 15 August |
| I, Spry | ABC1 | 4 November |
| Sisters of War | ABC1 | Still to debut |
| X-Ray | ABC1 | Still to debut |

== Specials ==
| Program | Channel | Debut date |
|---|---|---|
| André Rieu: Live in Australia | Ovation Channel | 1 January |
| Michael Bublé's Canada | FOX8 | 6 January |
| Jai Ho! | ABC2 | 16 January |
| Nine News Special: Dokkoon's Baby | Nine Network (Melbourne) | 21 January |
| Big Day Out Live 2009 | Channel [V] | 23 January |
| The Veronicas: Revenge Is Sweeter Tour | ABC2 | 24 January |
| The Australian of the Year 2010 | Nine Network | 25 January |
| 2010 Australia Day Live | MAX | 26 January |
| Hit for Haiti | Seven Network | 30 January |
| Black Saturday Remembered | Seven Network (Melbourne) | 6 February |
| Remembering Black Saturday | Nine Network (Melbourne) | 6 February |
| Tropfest 2010 | Movie Extra / Nine Network | 21 February |
| 2010 Sydney Gay and Lesbian Mardi Gras Parade | Arena | 27 February |
| Who Wants to Be a Millionaire? - Whizz Kids special | Nine Network | 27 February and 6 March |
| 5 Lost at Sea | ABC1 | 11 February |
| Welcome to Vancouver | Foxtel Winter Olympic channels / FOX8 / Fox Classics | 13 February |
| Moomba Street Parade | Seven Network (Melbourne) | 8 March |
| 2010 Melbourne International Comedy Festival Gala | Network Ten | 22 March |
| Caravan of Courage: Great Britain and Ireland | Network Ten | 17 June |
| Learn India with Hamish and Andy | Network Ten | 3 October |

== Documentaries ==
| Program | Channel | Debut date |
|---|---|---|
| Lake Eyre: Australia's Outback Wonder | ABC1 | 5 January |
| The Matilda Candidate | ABC1 | 26 January |
| Whale Shark | ABC1 | 31 January |
| Gnow or Never | ABC1 | 4 February |
| Trishna & Krishna: The Quest for Separate Lives | Seven Network | 7 February |
| Inside the Firestorm | ABC1 | 7 February |
| The Living Artist | ABC1 | 14 February |
| You Only Live Twice | ABC1 | 18 February |
| Whatever Happened to Brenda Hean? | ABC1 | 25 February |
| Tanaka-San Will Not Do Callisthenics | SBS One | 9 March |
| disAble-bodied Sailors | SBS One | 18 March |
| Fire Talker: The Life and Times of Charlie Perkins | ABC1 | 18 March |
| I, Psychopath | ABC1 | 25 March |
| Colours by Numbers: The Sudokumentary | ABC1 | 1 April |
| Delivering the Pandas | Network Ten | 2 April |
| Tim Cahill: The Unseen Journey | Seven Network | 3 April |
| Little Known Secrets of Sydney Harbour | Seven Network | 10 April |
| The Extraordinary Tale of William Buckley | ABC1 | 11 April |
| Miracle At The Zoo | Seven Network | 12 April |
| Kokoda | ABC1 | 22 and 29 April |
| The Art of Walking | ABC Television | Still to debut |
| Girls' Own War Stories | ABC Television | Still to debut |
| Indonesia Calling | ABC Television | Still to debut |
| The Inquisition | ABC Television | Still to debut |
| Kirby | ABC Television | Still to debut |
| Photography Hijacked | ABC Television | Still to debut |
| Rudely Interrupted | ABC Television | Still to debut |
| The Trouble with St Mary's | ABC Television | Still to debut |
| X | ABC Television | Still to debut |
