= Strange Birds in Paradise =

- Directed by: Charlie Hill-Smith
- Produced by: Jamie Nicolai, John Cherry
- Cinematography: Angus Kemp
- Music by: David Bridie, Hein Arumisore, Jacob Rumbiak, Ronny Kareni, Donny Roem
- Release date: 2009
- Country: Australia

Strange Birds in Paradise, subtitled A West Papuan Story is an Australian documentary film created by Adelaide filmmaker Charlie Hill-Smith.

== Reception ==
Andrew Fenton, The Advertiser states that Hill-Smith is trying to put too much into the film, writing "There are some powerful scenes but the overall result is an unfocused narrative that follows too many threads." Sallie Don wrote in The Australian that "It's via the music that filmmaker Charlie Hill-Smith documents the story, and he pushes you to look beyond the few impressions you may have of this wild and mostly inaccessible part of the world."

== Accolades ==
Year	Award	Nomination	Nominee	Result
2011	ARIA Music Awards	Best World Music Album	David Bridie, Hein Arumisore, Jacob Rumbiak, Ronny Kareni and Donny Roem	Nominated
2010	AFI Award	Best Feature Length Documentary	Jamie Nicolai, John Cherry	Nominated
2010	AFI Award	Best Direction in a Documentary	Charlie Hill-Smith	Nominated
2010	AFI Award	Best Cinematography in a Documentary	Angus Kemp	Nominated
2010	AFI Award	Best Sound in a Documentary	Mik La Vage, Doron Kipen, David Bridie	Nominated
2010	Inside Film Awards	Best Documentary	Charlie Hill-Smith (director), Jamie Nicolai (producer), John Cherry (producer)	Won

== Soundtrack ==
The soundtrack album Strange Birds in Paradise: A West Papuan Soundtrack was released through Wantok Musik. It earned David Bridie, Hein Arumisore, Jacob Rumbiak, Ronny Kareni and Donny Roem a nomination for a 2001 ARIA Award for Best World Music Album.

=== Track listing ===
1. Land Of The Morning Star
2. Jo Jo
3. E Mambo Simbo
4. Syofirumo
5. Sup Sup
6. Oweluk Tiage
7. Mapnduma
8. Yapo Mama Cica
9. Garamutarama
10. Awino Sup Ine
11. Apuse
12. Mystery Of Life
13. To Samuai Tandu
14. Kelly Kwalik Amungme Surge
