= AACTA Award for Best Children's Television Animation =

Australian television award

The AACTA Award for Best Children's Television Animation is a television award handed out by the Australian Academy of Cinema and Television Arts (AACTA) since 2009. It is awarded to a "children's drama series, a children's mini series, a long children's telefeature or a short children's telefeature which is created using animation". The award is presented to the producer(s) of the animated program.

== Winners and nominees ==
In the following table, winners are listed first, in boldface and highlighted in gold; those listed below the winner that are not in boldface or highlighted are the nominees.

Winner

Year	Program	Network	Recipient
**2009** (51st)	**Figaro Pho**	**ABC**	**Luke Jurevicius**
2009 (51st)	Classic Tales	ABC	Noel Price
2009 (51st)	The Adventures of Charlotte and Henry	Seven Network	Paige Livingston
2009 (51st)	Zeke's Pad	Seven Network	Avrill Stark; Delna Bhesania; Liz Scully; Leonard Terhoch
**2010** (52nd)	**Dirtgirlworld**	**ABC**	**Cate McQuillen**
2010 (52nd)	Erky Perky	Seven Network	Kristine Klohk; Barbara Stephen; Tracy Lenon; David Webster
2010 (52nd)	The Legend of Enyo	Seven Network	Avrill Stark; Michael Christensen

== See also ==
- AACTA Awards
