= Melanie Oppenheimer =

Australian historian and actress

Melanie Oppenheimer FASSA
- Born: 9 November 1957 (age 68); Sydney, New South Wales
- Occupations: Historian and academic
- Title: Professor
- Awards: Fellow of the Academy of the Social Sciences in Australia (2017)

Academic background
- Education: University of New England (BA, DipEd, MLitt); Macquarie University (PhD)
- Thesis: Volunteers in Action: Voluntary Work in Australia, 1939–1945 (1997)

Academic work
- Discipline: History
- Sub-discipline: Volunteering; Gender and war Biography
- Institutions: Flinders University; University of New England; University of Western Sydney

Melanie Nivison Oppenheimer, FASSA (born 9 November 1957) is an Australian historian, who specialises in the history of volunteering, and a former actress.

== Early life and acting ==
Oppenheimer was born in Sydney, New South Wales, and studied for a Bachelor of Arts degree at the University of New England (UNE). When UNE opened a drama department, she "fell in love with acting" and went on to enrol at the Webber Douglas Academy of Dramatic Art in London before starting a career as an actress on Australian television. She played Sarah Carson, the daughter of lead character Jennifer Carson (played by Lorraine Bayly), on the television series Carson's Law from 1984 to 1986.

== Academic career ==
Oppenheimer returned to UNE to complete a Master of Letters, and then a Doctor of Philosophy at Macquarie University. She worked as a research assistant in the history department of the University of Sydney, then held associate professor positions at the University of Western Sydney and the University of New England.

The Australian Red Cross commissioned Oppenheimer to write an official history of the organisation in 2010, its centennial year. The book, The Power of Humanity: 100 Years of Australian Red Cross, was published by HarperCollins and launched by the Governor-General of Australia, Sir Peter Cosgrove, in August 2014. She has written several biographical articles for the Australian Dictionary of Biography.

On 1 July 2013, Oppenheimer took up a professorship as Chair of History at Flinders University in South Australia. She was elected a Fellow of the Academy of the Social Sciences in Australia (FASSA) in 2017.

== Selected works ==
- Oppenheimer, Melanie Nivison (1999). Red Cross VAs: A history of the VAD movement in New South Wales. Walcha, N.S.W.: Ohio Productions. ISBN 0-9585751-1-8.
- Oppenheimer, Melanie (2002). All Work No Pay: Australian civilian volunteers in war. Walcha, N.S.W.: Ohio Productions. ISBN 0-9585751-5-0.
- Oppenheimer, Melanie (2006). Oceans of Love: Narrelle, an Australian nurse in World War I. Australian Broadcasting Corporation. Sydney, NSW: ABC Books. ISBN 978-0-7333-1710-1.
- Oppenheimer, Melanie (2008). Volunteering: Why we can't survive without it. Sydney: UNSW Press. ISBN 978-1-74223-070-2.
- Oppenheimer, Melanie (2008). Australian Women and War. Canberra, Australia: Department of Veteran's Affairs. ISBN 978-1-877007-28-6.
- Oppenheimer, Melanie; Deakin, Nicholas, eds. (2011). Beveridge and Voluntary Action in Britain and the Wider British World. Manchester: Manchester University Press. ISBN 978-0-7190-8381-5.
- Scates, Bruce; Oppenheimer, Melanie (2016). The Last Battle: Soldier settlement in Australia, 1916–1939. Australia: Cambridge University Press. ISBN 978-1-316-87029-7.
- Oppenheimer, Melanie; Anderson, Margaret; Paul, Mandy, eds. (2017). South Australia on the Eve of War. Mile End, South Australia: Wakefield Press. ISBN 978-1-74305-474-1.

=== As historical consultant ===
- Girls' Own War Stories (2010) ABC-TV documentary
