= Shakedown (TV series) =

- Genre: Drama
- Based on: 2015-19 Centrelink Robodebt Scandal
- Written by: Magda Wozniak; Sophie Miller; Blake Ayshford
- Directed by: Jennifer Leacy
- Starring: Kate Box; Mandy McElhinney; Justine Clarke; Sarah Peirse; Jack Patten; Johnny Carr
- Country of origin: Australia
- Original language: English
- No. of seasons: 1
- No. of episodes: 4

Production
- Executive producers: Rachel Okine; Brett Sleigh

Original release
- Network: ABC

Shakedown is an Australian drama for the Australian Broadcasting Corporation (ABC), the series released 22 November 2026. Produced by Lingo Pictures, the series follows the story of those trapped by the Centrelink Robodebt scheme in 2015–19 with debts they did not owe, the human cost of a bureaucratic nightmare unfold.

== Plot ==
Jenny Miller a grief-stricken mother is driven to find answers after the death of her son who was struggling with a debt to the Governments Centrelink robodebt recovery scheme a debt he did not owe. When a Centrelink worker raises concerns as a devastating truth emerges that those who owed debts that were sent automatically saw no way out, the human cost of the bureaucratic nightmare is laid bare as the government is forced to look at its entire scheme from 2015 to 2019.

== Cast ==
On 15 November 2026, the cast for the series was announced.

- Kate Box as Jenny Miller (Rhys' mother)
- Justine Clarke as Colleen Taylor (Centrelink Compliance Officer & Whistle-blower)
- Mandy McElhinney as Malisa Golightly (Then Deputy Secretary of DHS)
- Steve Peacocke as Greg Miller (Jenny Miller's husband, Rhys' stepfather)
- Sarah Peirse as Catherine Holmes AC SC (Commissioner of the Royal Commission into the Robodebt scheme)
- Jack Patten as Rhys Cauzzo (Robodebt recipient)
- Blazey Best as Louise Macleod (Senior Assistant Ombudsman)
- Johnny Carr as Justin Greggery KC (SC Assisting of the Royal Commission)
- Alison Bell as Kath Madgwick (Jarrad's mother)
- Rebecca Massey as Kathryn Campbell (Then Secretary of DHS)
- Guy Edmonds as Alan Tudge (Then Minister of Human Services)
- Justin Smith as Scott Morrison (Then Minister of Social Services)
- Emily Joy as Tenille Collins (Director of Compliance and Risk, DHS)
- Claire van der Boom as Rachelle Miller (Senior Media Advisor, Alan Tudge)
- Amy Kersey as Serena Wilson (Deputy Secretary Department of Social Services)

== Production ==
On 20 November 2025, ABC announced that the series had entered pre-production with production starting in May 2026.

During ABC's Upfront event, the series was a part of the line-up for shows expected to air in 2026.

On 15 October 2026, ABC announced the series would air from 22 November 2026 on ABC and iView with all episodes to be available on iView.
