= The Slap (American TV series) =

2015 American TV drama series

- Also known as: NBC's The Slap
- Genre: Drama
- Based on: The Slap by Christos Tsiolkas
- Developed by: Jon Robin Baitz; Walter F. Parkes
- Starring: Brian Cox; Melissa George; Thandie Newton; Zachary Quinto; Thomas Sadoski; Peter Sarsgaard; Uma Thurman
- Narrated by: Victor Garber
- Composers: Jon Ehrlich; Jason Derlatka
- Country of origin: United States
- Original language: English
- No. of seasons: 1
- No. of episodes: 8

Production
- Executive producers: Tony Ayres; Helen Bowden; Michael McMahon; Chris Oliver-Taylor; Lisa Cholodenko; Jon Robin Baitz; Walter F. Parkes; Laurie MacDonald; Ted Gold
- Producer: Rudd Simmons
- Cinematography: Frankie G. DeMarco
- Editor: Plummy Tucker
- Camera setup: Single-camera
- Running time: 42–43 minutes
- Production companies: P + M Image Nation; Scratchpad Productions; Matchbox Pictures; Universal Television

Original release
- Network: NBC
- Release: February 12 – April 2, 2015

The Slap is an American drama television miniseries, which aired on NBC from February 12 to April 2, 2015. It is an American adaptation of the Australian series of the same name, which was based on Christos Tsiolkas' 2008 novel of the same name. Each episode tells the events of the aftermath of a birthday party from the perspective of a different character. Jon Robin Baitz wrote the teleplay and Lisa Cholodenko directed the pilot episode.

== Plot ==
The miniseries revolves around the aftermath of a birthday party for a middle-aged city employee where Harry Apostolou slaps someone else's misbehaving child, Hugo, after he attempts to hit another child with a bat and kicks Harry in the leg. Hugo's mother, Rosie, insists on criminal charges, claiming that Harry's slap has caused Hugo PTSD. Though Rosie's diagnosis is later undermined when Hugo mentions how much he misses seeing Harry, the case slowly makes its way to court. Each episode tells the story from the perspective of a different character.

== Cast ==
- Peter Sarsgaard as Hector Apostolou, a 40-year-old assistant deputy commissioner
- Thandiwe Newton (credited as Thandie Newton) as Aisha Apostolou, Hector's wife and a clinic director
- Ashley Aufderheide as Melissa Apostolou, daughter of Hector and Aisha
- Khalid Alzouma as Adam Apostolou, older brother of Melissa
- Uma Thurman as Anouk Latham, Hector's childhood friend and a television executive producer
- Dylan Schombing as Hugo Weschler, the receiver of the titular slap
- Melissa George as Rosie Weschler, mother of Hugo
- Thomas Sadoski as Gary Weschler, father of Hugo
- Zachary Quinto as Harry Apostolou, Hector's cousin, a rare-auto dealer and the deliverer of the titular slap
- Marin Ireland as Sandi Apostolou, Harry's wife
- Owen Tanzer as Rocco Apostolou, Harry's pre-teen son
- Sofia Regan as Melody, an employee of Harry's
- Brian Cox as Manolis Apostolou, Hector's father
- Maria Tucci as Koula Apostolou, Hector's mother
- Michael Nouri as Thanasis Korkoulis, Harry's attorney
- Makenzie Leigh as Connie, a babysitter who watches Hector and Aisha's children
- Lucas Hedges as Ritchie Joanou (née Collins), Connie's best friend
- Ellen Adair as Bridget Saltire, the ADA assigned to the case
- Penn Badgley as Jamie, Anouk's much younger actor boyfriend
- Molly Price as Fiona Collins, Ritchie's mother
- Blythe Danner as Virginia Latham, Anouk's mother
- Victor Garber as the narrator (voice)

== Production ==
The miniseries was filmed on location in New York City (substituting for the novel's setting of Melbourne) and features Melissa George, who also played the role of Rosie in the original 2011 Australian adaptation of The Slap novel. Direction was by Michael Morris, Lisa Cholodenko, and Ken Olin. The series was written by Jon Robin Baitz, Walter F. Parkes, and Christos Tsiolkas. Costumes were designed by Jennifer von Mayrhauser and art direction was by Alison Ford. Mary-Louise Parker was originally cast as Anouk, but she had to drop out due to pneumonia and was replaced by Uma Thurman.

== Episodes ==
No.	Title	Directed by	Original release date	U.S. viewers (millions)
1	"Hector"	Lisa Cholodenko	February 12, 2015	5.13
On his 40th birthday, Hector, an assistant deputy commissioner, struggles with getting older, advancement at his job, and his attraction to his teenage babysitter, Connie, who works at his wife's medical clinic. During his birthday party with family and friends, his cousin Harry slaps Hugo, another couple's out-of-control child, for misbehaving causing an impact on everyone's lives moving forward.
2	"Harry"	Ken Olin	February 19, 2015	3.96
Two NYPD detectives speak to Hector about an investigation regarding the incident with Harry. Harry confronts Sandi and tries to ask if she spoke with Hector in secret, which she denies. Hector and Harry pay Gary and Rosie a visit in hopes that things will go well, but the mediation goes sour and after Harry storms off, Rosie calls the police. Rocco gets into a fight with a teammate from his basketball team. Rocco explains to Harry that he needs to stand up for himself, to which Harry replies that learning how to be assertive with control is something that the two need to learn. The NYPD detectives meet up with Harry and let him know that charges were pressed and that he will be arraigned in criminal court. Hector learns of Harry's arrest and goes to the court where he learns that Rosie accused Harry of assaulting the family by throwing a chair. Bail is posted, and Harry confides in Hector that this matter will be fought.
3	"Anouk"	Michael Morris	February 26, 2015	3.67
Anouk, Aisha, and Rosie discuss Harry's arrest. Rosie is happy about it, but Anouk suggests she drop the lawsuit. Rosie insinuates that Anouk is saying this because she doesn't have children, which causes Anouk to visit her mother, Virginia. After seeing Jamie perform at a nightclub, Anouk vomits in the bathroom and realizes she is pregnant. At dinner with Virginia, Anouk and Jamie learn that she is selling Anouk's home in order to move to Scotland, which upsets Anouk. The next day, Anouk breaks up with Jamie and contemplates having an abortion. Aisha tries to talk her out of it. Anouk learns Virginia has brain cancer and plans to visit a treatment center in Edinburgh, hence her plans to move to Scotland. Anouk confirms her pregnancy to Virginia and reconciles with Jamie.
4	"Manolis"	Michael Morris	March 5, 2015	3.92
Manolis is disturbed by the events going on with his family and tries to resolve the situation. Rosie, Gary, and Aisha meet with the District Attorney, who bluntly tells them that they don't have a case unless they can prove Harry has a longer history of being violent. Aisha looks very upset and stops talking. Hector is aghast at a sleazy but effective attorney who earns Harry's trust and business with his plan to ruin Rosie and Gary by revealing details of what they're really like. Later, when Manolis asks her for help in getting the case against Harry dismissed, Aisha tells him that several years ago, she treated Harry's wife Sandi after she came in with severe bruising to her face. Manolis confronts Harry, who denies ever hitting Sandi but hints that they did have other confrontations that could have resulted in injuries. Manolis and his wife reflect on how to let their children handle events now that they're adults and reunite with his oldest and best friend.
5	"Connie"	Ken Olin	March 12, 2015	2.74
Connie learns from her friend Richie that he has photos from the party where the slap occurred and also shows her kissing Hector. She asks him to delete the photos, and after tries to inspire Hector to be romantic but he bluntly says their affair, and her time as their babysitter, is over. A hurt Connie meets up with the boyfriend of her late "wild" absentee father Malcolm and learns about his irresponsible lifestyle. Meanwhile, the prosecutor and family of Hugo appear in a conference with the defendant Harry and his attorney, with the judge mediating. The defendant wants the case dismissed claiming it was self-defense, while the prosecutor refuses to back down, claiming the defendant is a child abuser. The judge assigns the case for trial. Connie sees Rosie later and finds her crying because the judge has ordered Hugo to have a psychological evaluation. Connie then tells her they still have the photos, which do not support Harry's version of what happened.
6	"Aisha"	Ken Olin	March 19, 2015	3.18
A Greek Public Relations expert wants Aisha, because she is not a relative, not Greek, and not a really close friend, to appear as a character witness for Harry. He feels that what they need is a respectable member of the community who is a physician to take the stand in his case and say that Harry is a good man whose deeds have helped kids and that he is a decent man. He points out that the criminal trial is just the beginning; if Harry is convicted, the child's family will use it as evidence to start a multi-million-dollar civil suit for damages. Aisha, who knows for a fact that Harry did cut Sandi with a punch to the temple years ago, weighs this while she nearly has a fling with a colleague, and then she and Hector sadly confess to each other the way they haven't been truly faithful.
7	"Rosie"	Michael Morris	March 26, 2015	3.22
As Harry's criminal trial approaches, Rosie's life begins to completely fall apart. She is called into Hugo's school regarding his bad behavior and after she snarls that the school hasn't been supportive and her son should be left to do whatever he wants, the principal tells her that Hugo is now immediately expelled. Gary gets angry at Rosie's behavior. When Rosie tries to get Ritchie to turn over the photos, Ritchie and his mom both tell Rosie to leave and not come back. Harry's lawyer Thanassis asks him if they can use some damaging personal information about Rosie that his researchers found, but Harry is reluctant. Rosie asks Harry to accept a "no contest" plea that will result in no jail time and a small fine. Harry turns her down, stating he needs to complete the trial so he can get his life back. After being drilled by the DA about his abusive treatment of Sandi, Harry accepts Thanassis's line of defense and Rosie's long list of failings comes up in a brutal cross-examination, revealing that Rosie struggled with post-partum depression following Hugo's birth, leading to her having neglected Hugo for hours when he was an infant, and drinking wine while she was breast-feeding him. Gary is horrified at Rosie's treatment and tells the DA about Ritchie's photos so that he will have to produce them; at the same time, Ritchie is at home deleting images from a video file card.
8	"Ritchie"	Ken Olin	April 2, 2015	3.13
A police detective serves a warrant for Richie's laptop to obtain the photos. Ritchie confirms that he deleted them but willingly surrenders his laptop and flash drive. Thanassis reveals his strategy to Harry: he will get the pictures thrown out and leak new information he acquired about Ritchie's past. A New York newspaper breaks the story about the slap and the subsequent trial, presenting it as an "only in New York" story, and also includes details on Ritchie's sordid past. With his past in print, Ritchie attempts suicide, but Gary calls an ambulance and Ritchie recovers. When questioned by Thanassis, Ritchie explains that he deleted the photos because they were photographs of people he cared about behaving badly and felt that no one should see them. Ritchie then confesses that the pictures contradicted Harry's version of events. Harry is found guilty of attempted assault of a minor in the third degree, but the judge sentences him to time already served. She then advises Gary and Rosie that they can expect a visit from Child Protective Services and tells them the entire legal process was a waste of time. Connie and Ritchie leave for college. Anouk's friends gather at her home to welcome her new baby, where Harry, Rosie, and Hugo are all uncomfortably in the same space. As the tension builds, a surprisingly well-behaved Hugo politely asks Anouk if he can hold her newborn, which she allows. While Hugo calmly holds Anouk's baby, the rest of the adults slowly gather around them as the series comes to an end.

== Reception ==
On Metacritic, the show has a 62 rating based on 33 reviews, indicating "generally favorable reviews".
