= The Slap (novel) =

2008 novel by Australian author Christos Tsiolkas

- First edition
- Author: Christos Tsiolkas
- Language: English
- Genre: Novel
- Publisher: Allen & Unwin (Australia); Penguin (U.S./U.K.)
- Publication date: 10 November 2008
- Publication place: Australia
- Media type: Print
- Pages: 483 pp. (first edition)
- ISBN: 978-1-74175-359-2
- OCLC: 265244779
- Dewey Decimal: A823.3 22
- LC Class: PR9619.3.T786 S53 2008

The Slap is a 2008 novel by Australian author Christos Tsiolkas.

The narrative is presented through the viewpoints of eight individual characters, and focuses on their reactions after a man controversially reprimands his friend's son by slapping him during a social gathering. The novel won the Commonwealth Writer's Prize in 2009, and was adapted into two miniseries, in Australia and the United States.

== Plot summary ==
At a barbecue in suburban Melbourne, a man slaps a 4-year-old boy across the face. The child, Hugo, has been misbehaving without any intervention by his parents, "the steely-eyed Rosie and the wimpish Gary". The slapper is Harry, cousin of the barbecue host and adulterous businessman whose slightly older son, Rocco, is being threatened by Hugo. This event sends the other characters "into a spiral, agonising and arguing over the notion that striking a child can ever be justified. Some believe a naughty boy should be taught some discipline, others maintain the police ought to be brought in to investigate a common assault" with a range of positions in between.

== Themes ==
A judge of the Commonwealth Writers' Prize, Nicholas Hasluck, described The Slap as "a controversial and daring novel" which examines "identities and personal relationships in a multicultural society" and "taps into universal tensions and dilemmas around family life and child-rearing."

== Structure ==
The story is told through the voices of eight characters, in third person and each in a chapter of their own. "The reverberations of the slap ... [are told] chronologically through each character's story". The characters range from two Year 12 students to a 71-year-old man, and comprise four males and four females. Reviewer Windsor writes that "As an architectural device, this is inspired. With their narrowed focus, the individual stories, up to 80 pages long, have an intensity to them that a conventional comprehensive narrative could not have come near."

== Main characters ==
(italic print signifies the eight characters whose points of view are given in the novel's different sections.)

- Aisha: a 40-something, Anglo-Indian veterinarian, a competent mother and efficient homemaker who runs her own clinic.
- Hector: Aisha's Greek husband, Harry's cousin. Host of the barbecue at which the titular "Slap" occurs.
- Adam and Melissa: children of Aisha and Hector.
- Connie: Year 12 student who works in Aisha's clinic and is having an enigmatic affair with her boss' husband, Hector.
- Richie: Connie's best friend, who is gay.
- Harry: Hector's cousin, perpetrator of the "Slap". A self-made man who has worked hard to build a large, luxurious home; owns several garages.
- Sandi: Harry's Serbian wife. Loyal and devoted to Harry.
- Rocco: Son of Harry and Sandi. Around eight years old.
- Kelly: An indigent mother-of-several, with whom Harry has an extra-marital affair. Kelly supplies Harry with cocaine; Harry pays Kelly's gas, water, and electricity bills.
- Van: a Vietnamese DVD pirate, Kelly's business partner.
- Rosie: childhood friend of Aisha, a white Australian, working-class, full-time mother to Hugo. Uses a parenting style similar to attachment parenting, or "gentle discipline". Presses charges against Harry for assaulting her child.
- Gary: Rosie's husband and Hugo's alcoholic father.
- Hugo: Son of Rosie and Gary. Four years old. Hugo is frustrated while trying to play with the older children, and waves a cricket bat around - the mother is seen as very responsive and in touch with her son's needs prior to this, but is momentarily distracted and Hugo is struck across his face by Harry - an adult male.
- Anouk: childhood friend of Rosie and Aisha. The only one of the threesome who is single and childless. More career-driven – a soap-opera scriptwriter. In a relationship with Rhys, the star of a soap-opera, who is around 20 years her junior.
- Manolis: elderly Greek patriarch, father of Hector. Shares a close relationship with his daughter-in-law Aisha, but takes a diametrically opposed stance to her regarding the slap, supporting his nephew Harry.
- Koula: elderly Greek matriarch, mother of Hector. Believes family should be held in higher regard than all other things. Takes an extremely disparate view of her daughter-in-law Aisha. Very gossipy. Fully supports Harry's actions regarding the slap.
- Elisavet: Sister of Hector, daughter of Manolis and Koula. Divorced with two young children: Sava and Angeliki.

== Awards and nominations ==
- ALS Gold Medal, 2008: winner
- Commonwealth Writers' Prize, 2009: winner for Best Book
- Miles Franklin Award, 2009: shortlisted
- Nielsen BookData Booksellers' Choice Award, 2009: winner
- Victorian Premier's Literary Awards, Vance Palmer Prize for Fiction, 2009: winner
- Man Booker Prize 2010: long listed

== Adaptations ==
The eight-part television series The Slap is an adaptation of the book. Its filming commenced in January 2011 and first screened on Australian television channel ABC1 from October 2011. An American adaptation of the series, with Melissa George reprising her role as Rosie, the slapped child's mother, premiered on the NBC network in February 2015.
