= The Slap (Australian TV series) =

2011 Australian TV drama series

- Intertitle
- Genre: Drama
- Written by: Emily Ballou; Alice Bell; Brendan Cowell; Kris Mrksa; Cate Shortland
- Directed by: Jessica Hobbs; Matthew Saville; Tony Ayres; Robert Connolly
- Starring: Jonathan LaPaglia; Melissa George; Essie Davis; Alex Dimitriades; Lex Marinos; Diana Glenn; Sophie Okonedo; Anthony Hayes; Sophie Lowe; Blake Davis; Oliver Ackland; Toula Yianni; Eugenia Fragos; Rebecca Downie
- Country of origin: Australia
- Original language: English
- No. of episodes: 8

Production
- Executive producer: Penny Chapman
- Producers: Tony Ayres; Helen Bowden; Michael McMahon
- Running time: 51 minutes
- Production company: Matchbox Pictures

Original release
- Network: ABC1
- Release: 6 October – 24 November 2011

Related
- The Slap (American TV series)

The Slap is an Australian television drama series. It was first broadcast on ABC1 from 6 October to 24 November 2011. The series is based on The Slap, a 2008 novel by Australian author Christos Tsiolkas, which explores what happens when a man slaps a child, who is not related to him, at a suburban barbecue.

Filmed in Melbourne, Victoria, the series was produced by Matchbox Pictures' Tony Ayres, Helen Bowden and Michael McMahon, with Penny Chapman serving as executive producer. The directors—Jessica Hobbs, Matthew Saville, Tony Ayres and Robert Connolly—directed two episodes each. The writing team included Emily Ballou, Alice Bell, Brendan Cowell, Kris Mrksa, and Cate Shortland.

The series was aired on DirecTV's Audience Network in 2012, and an American adaptation of the series, also starring Melissa George, premiered on NBC on 12 February 2015.

== Characters ==
=== Main ===
- Hector (Jonathan LaPaglia) Hector seems to have it all. He is handsome, financially secure, and married to the beautiful Aisha; they have two healthy children, Adam and Melissa. From the outside it looks like his doting Greek parents have handed him everything on a plate, but under this ideal façade lies Hector's dangerous secret.
- Anouk (Essie Davis) At 41, Anouk feels the inevitability of getting older but does not want to grow up. She writes for a TV soap, dreams of writing a novel, and is dating a much younger (and far less mature) man.
- Harry (Alex Dimitriades) Harry, Hector's cousin, is a self-made man, a mechanic with his own business. He has the perfect wife, the perfect child, the perfect house by the beach, but now all of that is being threatened by a single slap. He'd done it without thinking, although in his opinion, the kid deserved it.
- Connie (Sophie Lowe) Connie is a 17-year-old orphan who lives with her aunt, Tasha and works for Aisha. She is completing her final year of high school, but has many other things on her mind. Young and curious, she is still working out many things about life. Her best friend is Richie.
- Rosie (Melissa George) When Rosie first became a mother she had many conflicting feelings about it and took much time to adjust to the massive changes, but now her commitment to Hugo is absolute. She knows that even if she fails at everything else, at least Hugo will grow up knowing how much he is loved.
- Manolis (Lex Marinos) Manolis, Hector's father, came to Australia from Greece many years ago, as a young man full of hope and excited about the prospect of life in a new country. Now he is a man approaching the end of his life, watching his old friends die around him, and not understanding the younger generation's greed and selfishness.
- Aisha (Sophie Okonedo) Aisha is married to Hector; her strength and resilience hold her family together. She is also a successful professional woman with her own veterinary business. She enters her forties assailed by doubts about her marriage and future.
- Richie (Blake Davis) Richie is Connie's best friend at school; like her, he is trying to work out his identity, beliefs, and boundaries. What he wishes most is that the world was a simple, happy place where everyone just got along.

=== Supporting ===
- Gary (Anthony Hayes)
- Sandi (Diana Glenn)
- Rhys (Oliver Ackland)
- Tracey (Jane Allsop)
- Koula (Toula Yianni)
- Elisavet (Eugenia Fragos)
- Narrator (William McInnes)
- Andrew Petrious (Steve Mouzakis)
- Hugo (Julian Mineo)
- Bilal (Tony Briggs)
- Dania (Freya Adams)
- Shamira (Peta Brady)
- Craig (Brendan Cowell)
- Dimitri (Thomas Hatzilepos)
- Kelly (Katherine Halliday)
- Ali (Dimitri Baveas)
- Adam (Adrian Van Der Heyden)
- Melissa (Liberty Townsend)
- Rocco (Raffaele Costabile)
- Rachel (Gillian Jones)
- Tasha (Maude Davey)
- Jenna (Emily Wheaton)
- Lenin (Ivan Bradara)
- Tina (Charlotte Nicdao)
- Jordan (Basil Sikiotis)
- Sava (George Vasilakakos)
- Angelika (Caitlin Tsiolkas)
- Dylan (Ashley Zukerman)

== Episodes ==
No.	Title	Directed by	Written by	Original release date
1	"Hector"	Jessica Hobbs	Kris Mrksa	6 October 2011
Family and friends gather at Hector's house for a BBQ to celebrate his 40th birthday. But during the festivities a guest slaps a child who is not his own. No-one can see it at the time, but this single act begins to unravel the social fabric which once linked them all together.
2	"Anouk"	Jessica Hobbs	Emily Ballou	13 October 2011
In the days and weeks after the slap Anouk discovers that the incident has unleashed unexpected responses from those around her. She is torn between her friendships and her beliefs and faces decisions about her own life which threaten to overwhelm her.
3	"Harry"	Matthew Saville	Brendan Cowell	20 October 2011
As the police become involved, Harry and Sandi begin to fear that the slap will threaten their reputation, lifestyle and, most importantly, their family. Harry tries to take matters into his own hands but it's too late.
4	"Connie"	Matthew Saville	Alice Bell	27 October 2011
Things with Connie and Hector haven't been the same since the slap. She decides to confront Hector but his reaction propels her into a decision that will have serious consequences.
5	"Rosie"	Robert Connolly	Cate Shortland	3 November 2011
Rosie's outrage has been building since the slap and now finally she is given her day in court. The friends from the BBQ gather again but this time under very different circumstances.
6	"Manolis"	Tony Ayres	Kris Mrksa	10 November 2011
Struggling to understand the selfishness and greed of his children's generation, Manolis watches in alarm as the slap divides his family. He calls on a special bond to try to put things right.
7	"Aisha"	Robert Connolly	Emily Ballou	17 November 2011
The slap has taken a toll on Hector and Aisha's relationship, or maybe it has just exposed the issues that were already there. They go away together to try to restore their marriage, but their holiday does not turn out as planned.
8	"Richie"	Tony Ayres	Brendan Cowell	24 November 2011
Lies, betrayal and adultery all come to a head as people are forced to make decisions about their lives and behaviour. When Richie gets caught in the crossfire, he looks to a desperate solution.

== Broadcast ==
=== Domestic ===
The Slap was originally screened by ABC1 each Thursday at 8:30 pm from 6 October 2011. Repeats followed on the preceding Friday nights on ABC2.

=== International ===
- In the United Kingdom, this series first aired on BBC Four each Thursday at 10 pm from 27 October 2011 with repeats following late Saturday nights. It is currently available in the UK to watch on the STV Player.
- In Poland, Spain, Portugal, Greece, Turkey and Asia, this series first aired on Sundance Channel each Thursday at 10 pm from 12 April 2012.
- In the United States, this series first aired on Audience Network each Wednesday at 10 pm E/P (9 pm C) from 15 February 2012.
- In Ontario, Canada, this series first aired on TVO each Monday at 10 pm from 4 June 2012 with repeats following Friday nights at 10 pm.
- In Brazil, this series has been acquired by Globosat, premiere on 11 September 2012, at 10:00 pm.
- In New Zealand, this series first aired on TV3 each Wednesday at 8:30 pm from 11 July 2012.
- In Israel, the series first aired from late September 2012 on Hot's video on demand service and will be shown later on the Hot 3 channel.
- In Sweden, this series first aired on SVT2 each Sunday at 8:00 pm from 13 January 2013. The title in Swedish is Örfilen.
- In Norway, this series first aired on NRK2 on Thursdays at 9:30 pm from 15 May 2014, with re-runs on NRK 1 on Tuesdays at 11:45 pm from 14 October 2014. The title in Norwegian is "Et slag i ansiktet" (A slap in the face).
- In Finland, this series has been acquired by Yle and aired on Mondays at 9:30 pm from 11 November 2013. The title in Finnish is Läimäys.
- In Iceland, the series aired on RÚV on Mondays at 9:00 pm from 4 March 2013. The Icelandic title is Löðrungurinn.
- In France and Germany, the series first aired on Arte, each Thursday at 8:15 pm from 5 September 2013.

== Reception ==
=== Critical reception ===
The series received generally positive reviews. Holly Byrnes of The Daily Telegraph said after viewing the first episode that The Slap is "arguably the best Australian drama produced this year", and Luke Buckmaster of Crikey commented after seeing previews, "The dramas and interpersonal relationships are engrossing from the get-go, the story like a David Williamson script that actually has bite, tension and doesn't pander to racial or cultural stereotypes. The Slap presents a view of middle class multicultural Australia rarely seen in film and television." David Knox of TV Tonight also praised the series, writing after episode one, "I was completely hooked by its ability to present three-dimensional characters on the screen and its strength in telling an urban story. So confident are the sum of the parts that frankly it feels like this will only get better. The Slap is one of the bravest dramas of the year."

Clem Bastow of The Sydney Morning Herald had the opposite view, however, writing that the program contains, "listless direction and lifeless editing (huge pauses between great swathes of dialogue), an adaptation that squishes large passages of the narrative into bite-sized chunks (witness Hector and Connie's divebomb from flirty glances and kissing to Connie suddenly deciding he was repellent), and the actors wandering around in the middle of it all." Despite this earlier negative review, the Herald subsequently gave The Slap its "Couch Potato" award for best Australian drama of the year. Kit MacFarlane in Metro offered further negative evaluation of the series, finding that "despite a strong dramatic foundation, The Slap is ultimately an exercise in announcing drama rather than exploring it, presenting a scenario drenched in forced excess, sensationalism and artistic posturing" and describing it as "around seven hours of soap opera masquerading as earnest drama." MacFarlane goes on to suggest that its critical popularity might point to "a regression in the ability to analyse screen texts and narrative nuances" and that "The Slap's themes and cultural ideas have been explored countless times before in a variety of different ways."

=== Viewer response ===
The initial episode gained viewing figures of nearly 1 million people, winning its timeslot, when it was first shown on ABC1. Later, excluding figures for the final episode, the ABC announced that The Slap was averaging 952,000 metro (five main capital city) viewers on ABC1 and a further 232,000 viewers on ABC2 with 14% of viewing as Timeshifted (watched later through various PVR devices). It has recorded 566,000 plays via ABC iview and 204,000 plays via the official website.

=== Series ratings ===
Episode	Title	Original airdate	Viewers	Nightly rank
1	"Hector"	6 October 2011	0.946	5
2	"Anouk"	13 October 2011	0.912	7
3	"Harry"	20 October 2011	0.858	7
4	"Connie"	27 October 2011	0.811	9
5	"Rosie"	3 November 2011	0.915	7
6	"Manolis"	10 November 2011	0.906	6
7	"Aisha"	17 November 2011	0.832	7
8	"Richie"	24 November 2011	0.831	8

=== Awards and nominations ===
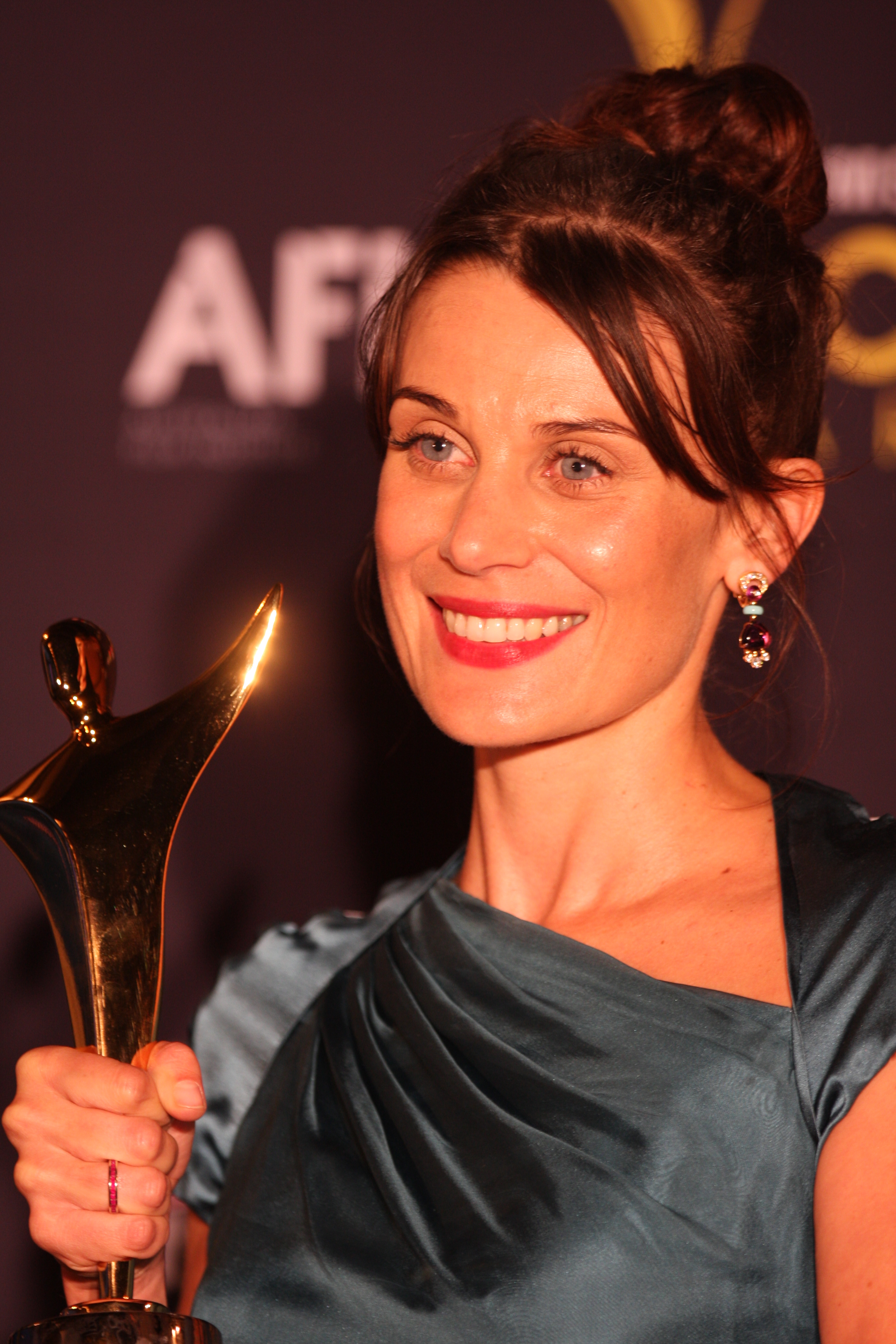
Diana Glenn pictured with her AACTA Award

Year	Award	Category	Recipient(s)	Outcome
2012	AACTA Awards	Best Telefeature, Mini Series or Short Run Series	The Slap	Won
2012	AACTA Awards	Best Lead Actor	Alex Dimitriades	Won
2012	AACTA Awards	Best Lead Actor	Jonathan LaPaglia	Nominated
2012	AACTA Awards	Best Guest or Supporting Actress – Drama	Diana Glenn	Won
2012	AACTA Awards	Best Director	Matthew Saville	Won
2012	AACTA Awards	Best Director	Jessica Hobbs	Nominated
2012	AACTA Awards	Best Screenplay	Brendan Cowell	Won
2012	AACTA Awards	Best Screenplay	Kris Mrksa	Nominated
2012	AACTA Awards	Best Male Performance	Lex Marinos	Nominated
2012	Australian Directors' Guild Awards	Best Direction in a TV Drama Series	Matt Saville	Won
2012	Australian Writers' Guild Awards	Best Television Mini-Series Adaptation	The Slap	Won
2012	BAFTA Television Awards	Best International Programme	The Slap	Nominated
2012	Equity Awards	Outstanding Performance by an Ensemble in a Television Movie or Miniseries	Cast	Won
2012	Logie Awards	Most Outstanding Drama Series, Miniseries or Telemovie	The Slap	Won
2012	Logie Awards	Most Outstanding Actor	Alex Dimitriades	Nominated
2012	Logie Awards	Most Outstanding Actress	Essie Davis	Nominated
2012	Logie Awards	Most Outstanding Actress	Melissa George	Won
2012	Monte-Carlo Television Festival	Outstanding International Producer (Drama Series)	Michael McMahon, Tony Ayres, Helen Bowden	Nominated
2012	Monte-Carlo Television Festival	Outstanding Actor in a Drama Series	Blake Davis	Nominated
2012	Monte-Carlo Television Festival	Outstanding Actor in a Drama Series	Anthony Hayes	Nominated
2012	Monte-Carlo Television Festival	Outstanding Actress in a Drama Series	Melissa George	Nominated
2012	Monte-Carlo Television Festival	Outstanding Actress in a Drama Series	Sophie Okonedo	Nominated
2012	Screen Music Awards	Best Music for a Mini-Series or Telemovie	Antony Partos	Nominated
2012	Screen Music Awards	Best Soundtrack Album	Michael Lira, Jono Ma, Antony Partos, Irine Vela	Won
2012	Screen Music Awards	Best Television Theme	Antony Partos	Won
2012	Virgin Media TV Awards	Best Actress	Melissa George	Nominated

== TV-related merchandise ==
The Region 4 DVD and Blu-ray was released on 1 December 2011.

The Region 2 DVD was released on 9 January 2012.

The accompanying paperback book was released on 24 August 2011: Tsiolkas, Christos (2011). The Slap. Allen & Unwin. ISBN 978-1-74237-560-1.

== American adaptation ==
An eight-episode adaptation of The Slap premiered on NBC on 12 February 2015, in which Melissa George reprised her role of Rosie.
