= Peekaboo (film) =

2011 Australian short film

- Promotional poster
- Directed by: Damien Power
- Written by: Damien Power
- Produced by: Joe Weatherstone
- Starring: Justine Clarke; Alan Dukes; Marisa Bedwell; Marli Bedwell
- Cinematography: Simon Chapman
- Edited by: Katie Flaxman
- Music by: Ryan Grogan
- Release date: 2011
- Country: Australia
- Language: English

Peekaboo is a 2011 Australian short film written and directed by Damien Power, and produced by Joe Weatherstone.

The film was a finalist in the Dendy Awards for Australian Short Films at the 2011 Sydney Film Festival.

== Synopsis ==
On the train home from the Easter Show, an over-tired little girl is hyped-up by a stranger, who plays a game of peekaboo with her, until her mother begins to feel disturbed by the interest he's showing. A short time later, the girl disappears in a carpark and her desperate mother searches. A glimpse of the man from the train fires her imagination, with devastating consequences.

== Production ==
- The filmmakers raised the film's entire $5,500 budget through crowd-funding online.
- Peekaboo was filmed on location in Sydney, Australia, over three days in June 2010.
- The film was shot on a Canon 5D DSLR with Canon 24-70mm, 70-200mm and 16-35mm lenses, and a Zacuto shoulder rig with an onboard monitor. DOP Simon Chapman chose to use zoom lenses over prime lenses in order find shots very quickly, because of the very young actors in the cast. All the interiors were shot at 1000ASA, which meant they could be shot primarily with available light.
- The film was finished in May 2011.

== Cast ==
- Justine Clarke as Jillian
- Alan Dukes as Man
- Marisa Bedwell as Marisa
- Marli Bedwell as Marli

== Reception ==
Tom Goodwin from the Co-Op Post wrote, "Short, direct and surprisingly brutal in its finale, Peekaboo stood head and shoulders above most of the other entries on display."

Matt Riveria gave Peekaboo 4/5 stars in the 2011 Sydney Film Festival Critics Poll.

== Festivals and awards ==
- Finalist - Dendy Awards for Australian Short Films - Sydney Film Festival 2011
- In competition – Melbourne International Film Festival, Australia, 2011
- WINNER AUDIENCE AWARD – Canberra Short Film Festival, Australia, 2011
- Official Selection – Wide Angle Short Film Showcase – Busan International Film Festival, South Korea, 2011 (international premiere)
- WINNER BEST TASMANIAN SHORT FILM – BOFA Film Festival, Launceston, Australia, 2011
- WINNER SHOWTIME TALENT ASSIST AWARD – SPAA, Australia, 2011
- WINNER BEST EDITING – Flickerfest, Sydney, Australia, 2012
- WINNER SBS AWARD / WINNER BEST EDITING / WINNER AUDIENCE AWARD – 18th World of Women's Cinema Festival, Sydney, Australia, 2012
- WINNER BEST FILM JUDGED BY INDUSTRY – West End Film Festival, Brisbane, Australia, 2012
- HONOURABLE MENTION – Australian Film Festival, Sydney, Australia, 2012
- WINNER BEST AUSTRALIAN FILM – Mudgee International Short Film Festival, Mudgee, Australia, 2012
- WINNER PEOPLE’S CHOICE AWARD / WINNER EMERGING SCREENWRITER – Shorts Film Festival, Adelaide, Australia, 2012
- NOMINATED BEST FILM – St. Kilda Film Festival, Melbourne, Australia, 2012
- Official Selection – Dungog Film Festival, Australia, 2012
- In competition – Seattle International Film Festival, 2012 (US premiere)
- In competition- Ladahk International Film Festival, India, 2012
- AICE Australian Film Festival – Haifa, Jerusalem, Tel Aviv, Israel, 2012
- Official Selection – Revelation Perth International Film Festival, Australia, 2012
- Official Selection – BUSHO – Budapest International Short Film Festival, Budapest, Hungary, 2012
- Official Selection - Scone Short Film Festival, Scone, Australia, 2012
- In competition - Rome International Film Festival, Georgia, USA, 2012
- In competition – LAShortsFest, Los Angeles, USA, 2012
- In competition – Milwaukee Film Festival, USA, 2012
- WINNER BEST DIRECTOR – Miami Short Film Festival, USA, 2012
- In competition – Milwaukee Short Film Festival, USA, 2012
- In competition – Cockatoo Island Film Festival, Australia, 2012
- WINNER BEST SUSPENSE FILM – Couchfest, various USA, 2012
- In competition – Tallgrass International Film Festival, Wichita, USA, 2012
- In competition – St. Louis International Film Festival, USA, 2012
- NOMINATED – BEST EDITING IN A SHORT FILM – Australian Screen Editors Guild, 2012
- In competition – Dallas International Film Festival, USA, 2013
- WINNER PRIX DE LA MEILLEURE RÉALISATION (BEST DIRECTION) – Courts des îles Festival, Tahiti, 2013
