= Girls' Own War Stories =

- Directed by: Jennifer Ainge
- Produced by: Jennifer Ainge
- Narrated by: Isobel Kirk
- Edited by: Alan Erson
- Music by: Dave Rae
- Release date: 2011
- Running time: 70 minutes
- Country: Australia
- Language: English

Girls' Own War Stories is an Australian television documentary film, first broadcast by the Australian Broadcasting Corporation at 8.30 pm. on 21 April 2011.

== Premise ==
The documentary consists of interviews with various Australian women whose lives were changed during World War II by the necessity for women to take on jobs previously performed by men. Apart from directly replacing men on active service, many were new positions arising through the exigencies of war – production of war materiel, transcribing enemy communications, plotting ship and aircraft sightings, and so on, as well as the more traditional roles of nursing. The policy of restricting female workers to homeland duties was relaxed as the war dragged on.

It also deals with changed modes of relaxation, as the cities became the province of young females: beach-going and dancing in particular – often, during the war with Japan, accompanied by well-dressed, well-paid and handsome American servicemen.

The interviewees' words are punctuated by contemporary film clips, including much privately owned, previously unreleased, footage contributed by the Cottee family. Assoc. Professor Melanie Oppenheimer and Dr Hera Cook served as historical consultants.

== Home media ==
The ABC published the film on DVD (Region 4, 16:9 format, CC, 70 mins).

== Reviews ==
"Girls' Own War Stories is a lively and engaging documentary and the women whose stories it tells are witty, articulate and reflective. The film could be well utilised in Humanities (History) and in any units focusing on gender roles, Australian cultural identity, war and social change. It would be appropriate for all levels of secondary school, particularly middle to senior."
