= Blake Davis (actor) =

Australian actor

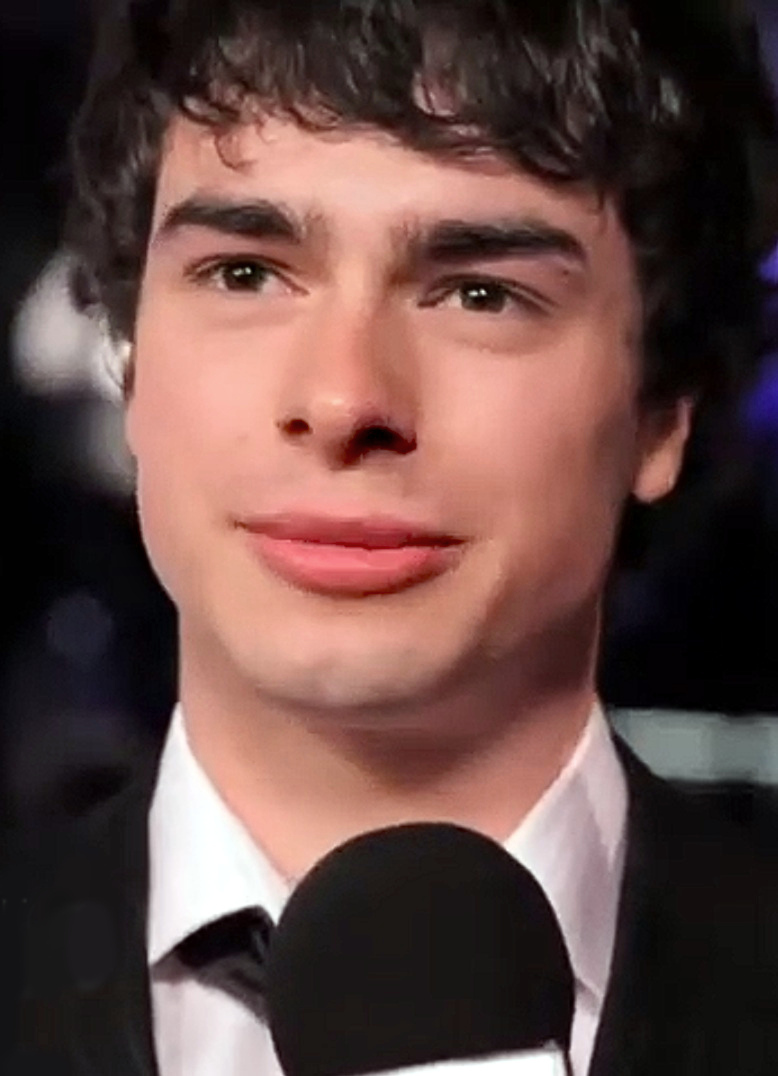
Blake Davis at MIFF 2011

Blake Davis (born 1992) is an Australian actor. Davis' most noted TV roles have been in Tangle (as Max Williams) and Dead Gorgeous (as Jonathan). In 2011, he starred as Richie in the ABC series The Slap, which is based on the 2008 novel by Australian author Christos Tsiolkas. In 2012, Davis appeared in the third season of Tangle.

Since 2015, Davis also has a successful career in real estate. In 2025, he appeared in Selling Sunset (2025), where he met and began dating Emma Hernan.

== Filmography ==
- Bringing Our Stories Home (2016) – Gordon Wallace (one episode)
- Pulitzer (2015) – Ian (short film)
- Mr and Mrs Murder (2013) – Rhys (one episode)
- The Wizard (2013) – Cameron (short film)
- Fun City (2013) – John (short film)
- The Slap (2011) – Richie
- The Gidji (2010) – Trent (short film)
- Dead Gorgeous (2010) – Jonathon
- Tangle (2009–2012) – Max Williams
- Lovesick (2009) – Boy (short film)
- Rush (2008) – Daniel (one episode)
- Bed of Roses (2008) – Will (two episodes)
- Blue Heelers (2005) – Clarke Thompson (one episode)

=== Theatre ===
- Beached (Griffin Theatre Company, 2013) –Arty
- 8 (Her Majesty's Theatre and Sydney Town Hall, 2012) – Elliot Perry
- All About My Mother (MTC, 2010) – Esteban
