= Jessica Hobbs =

New Zealand television director

Jessica Hobbs (born 1967) is a New Zealand television director. She won the 2021 Outstanding Directing for a Drama Series Emmy Award for the episode "War" of The Crown.

== Early life ==
Hobbs grew up in Christchurch. Her mother is director Aileen O'Sullivan.

== Career ==
After studying acting but deciding not to pursue it as a career, she got her start in radio drama productions. She moved into film and was assistant director for Jane Campion's An Angel at My Table. Her directing credits after moving to Australia in the 1990s include Heartbreak High and The Slap. She then worked on the UK series Broadchurch. She began directing episodes of The Crown beginning in season three, and was nominated for an Emmy Award for directing that season's final episode. She won an Emmy Award for directing the season-four episode "War".

== Personal life ==
She has a daughter and a son. Her husband is director Jonathan Teplitzky.
