= List of Tangle episodes =

The following is a list of episodes for the Australian television programme Tangle. A total of 22 episodes have aired.

== Series overview ==
| Season | Episodes | Originally released | |
| Season | Episodes | First released | Last released |
|---|---|---|---|
| 1 | 10 | October 1, 2009 | November 26, 2009 |
| 2 | 6 | July 20, 2010 | August 24, 2010 |
| 3 | 6 | March 25, 2012 | April 29, 2012 |

== Episodes ==
=== Series 1 (2009) ===
| No. overall | No. in season | Title | Directed by | Written by | Original release date |
|---|---|---|---|---|---|
| 1 | 1 | "Season 1, Episode 1" | Jessica Hobbs | Fiona Seres | 1 October 2009 |
| 2 | 2 | "Season 1, Episode 2" | Jessica Hobbs | Fiona Seres | 1 October 2009 |
| 3 | 3 | "Season 1, Episode 3" | Jessica Hobbs | Tony McNamara | 8 October 2009 |
| 4 | 4 | "Season 1, Episode 4" | Matt Saville | Fiona Seres | 15 October 2009 |
| 5 | 5 | "Season 1, Episode 5" | Matt Saville | Tony McNamara | 22 October 2009 |
| 6 | 6 | "Season 1, Episode 6" | Matt Saville | Fiona Seres | 29 October 2009 |
| 7 | 7 | "Season 1, Episode 7" | Matt Saville | Fiona Seres | 5 November 2009 |
| 8 | 8 | "Season 1, Episode 8" | Jessica Hobbs | Tony McNamara | 12 November 2009 |
| 9 | 9 | "Season 1, Episode 9" | Stuart McDonald | Fiona Seres | 19 November 2009 |
| 10 | 10 | "Season 1, Episode 10" | Stuart McDonald | Fiona Seres & Tony McNamara | 26 November 2009 |

=== Series 2 (2010) ===
| No. overall | No. in season | Title | Directed by | Written by | Original release date |
|---|---|---|---|---|---|
| 11 | 1 | "Season 2, Episode 1" "Cortège" | Stuart McDonald | Fiona Seres | 20 July 2010 |
| 12 | 2 | "Season 2, Episode 2" "The Day After" | Stuart McDonald | Tony McNamara | 27 July 2010 |
| 13 | 3 | "Season 2, Episode 3" "Desire" | Stuart McDonald | Fiona Seres & Judi McCrossin | 3 August 2010 |
| 14 | 4 | "Season 2, Episode 4" "Fallout" | Emma Freeman | Fiona Seres | 10 August 2010 |
| 15 | 5 | "Season 2, Episode 5" "Sleepwalking" | Emma Freeman | Fiona Seres | 17 August 2010 |
| 16 | 6 | "Season 2, Episode 6" "Lost and Found" | Emma Freeman | Judi McCrossin & Fiona Seres | 24 August 2010 |

=== Series 3 (2012) ===
| No. overall | No. in season | Title | Directed by | Written by | Original release date |
|---|---|---|---|---|---|
| 17 | 1 | "Season 3, Episode 1" | Emma Freeman | Fiona Seres | 25 March 2012 |
| 18 | 2 | "Season 3, Episode 2" | Emma Freeman | Fiona Seres | 1 April 2012 |
| 19 | 3 | "Season 3, Episode 3" | Emma Freeman | Fiona Seres | 8 April 2012 |
| 20 | 4 | "Season 3, Episode 4" | Michael James Rowland | Tony McNamara | 15 April 2012 |
| 21 | 5 | "Season 3, Episode 5" | Michael James Rowland | Fiona Seres | 22 April 2012 |
| 22 | 6 | "Season 3, Episode 6" | Michael James Rowland | Tony McNamara | 29 April 2012 |
