= Dead Gorgeous =

2010 Australian television show

- Main Cast
- Genre: Fantasy; Comedy; Adventure
- Created by: Barbara Slade
- Directed by: Stephen Maxwell Johnson (9 eps); Wayne Blair (4 eps)
- Starring: Melissa Howard; Poppy Lee Friar; Alexandra Coppinger
- Opening theme: "Life and Death" by Annabelle Priftis
- Countries of origin: Australia; United Kingdom
- No. of seasons: 1
- No. of episodes: 13

Production
- Running time: 25–30 minutes

Original release
- Network: BBC Two; CBBC
- Release: 15 March – 31 March 2010
- Network: ABC1; ABC3
- Release: 5 April – 21 April 2010

Dead Gorgeous is a 2010 children's supernatural fantasy television show which premiered on 15 March 2010 in Britain and 5 April 2010 in Australia. It was produced by Burberry Productions and Coolabi Productions with funding from Screen Australia, and directed by Stephen Maxwell Johnson and Wayne Blair. The programme was last re-aired on CBBC on July 10, 2013, at 12:55 p.m.

== Plot ==
Dead Gorgeous follows the adventures of three sisters, Rebecca, Sophie and Hazel Ainsworth who died in a terrible carriage crash along with their beloved nanny, during the Victorian era. Feeling they never had the chance to experience life properly, Rebecca applies to the ghost council for another chance of life. Their wish is granted but they return 150 years after their death to find their home has been turned into a private boarding school. They are "Living Ghosts" who appear to be normal people but have ghostly abilities such as walking through walls. Unable to reveal their secret the sisters are forced to fit into the 21st century as students in the school that used to be their home. As three refined, old-fashioned young ladies, they are baffled by modern life but with the help of their ghost-guardian Agatha, and a motley selection of ghosts they manage to survive the challenges modern culture brings. They struggle during their attempt to adjust to modern life but are helped by these people.

== Cast ==
- Melissa Howard as Rebecca – 16-year-old Rebecca Catherine Elizabeth is the oldest of the Ainsworth sisters. When the sisters are killed in a tragic accident she feels particularly cheated as there was romance in the air. Rebecca applies to the ghost council for a second chance at life for her and her sisters. Rebecca adapts well to life in the 21st century, wanting to fit in and enjoy all the luxury and adventure the new life has to offer. She also is quite into the new trends and will go to great lengths to become popular or accepted, she is head over heels in love with David who is too brainless to notice. Jonathan has strong feelings for Rebecca but is too shy to show it too greatly.
- Poppy Lee Friar as Sophie – 15-year-old Sophia Constance Etheldred is the middle Ainsworth sister. When the girls begin their life in the modern world Sophie is not happy that Rebecca applied for the girls to be given a second chance without discussing it with her. This new, modern world is not a comfortable place for Sophie. Skimpy sports uniforms embarrass her. She would rather be painting or doing her needlework than just about any pastime the 21st century has to offer. She likes long clothing and is quite modest and deep inside still disgusted about the state of the new world and may never adapt but she tries her hardest to fit into this new strange world. Her best friend is Charlie. Friar received an AACTA nomination for her portrayal of the character.
- Alexandra Coppinger as Hazel – 12-year-old Hazel is the youngest of the three Ainsworth sisters. She is adventurous and also a lot of fun but at times can be very affectionate and caring. The relationship between her and her sisters is very strong and she has easily adapted to new technology (she learns how to rap and teaches her sisters) and would be most pleased if Sophie were more interested in the 21st century's technology offerings. Her best friend is Mattie. She has noticed Jonathan's affections for Rebecca, when Rebecca cannot realize them.
- Blake Davis as Jonathan – Jonathan is intrigued by the new girls at school and quickly befriends the Ainsworth sisters. He helps them make their way through the new and baffling world of the 21st century. It doesn't take long before he discovers the girls' secret; at first he is terrified and afraid but he slowly gets used to it and keeps their secret. Jonathan has strong feelings for Rebecca however he is too shy too show them obviously.
- Chris Milligan as David – David might not be the smartest boy at school but he is probably the most handsome, which makes him incredibly popular with the girls. It doesn't take long before Rebecca sets her sights on him, but there are others who are also vying for David's attentions. David would much rather play sport than spend time in the classroom.
- Aisha Dee as Christine – Christine is one of the coolest girls in school. Her parents are wealthy and that could be one reason why everyone wants to be her friend. When Rebecca meets Christine and her 'gang' of friends she desperately wants to be accepted. Rebecca will go to extraordinary lengths to be one of Christine's friends which gives Christine a lot of opportunities to take advantage of her. Christine knows what she wants and she knows how to get it. Although she seems quite rough and hard sometimes on the outside, she has a soft and kind side on the inside, but she doesn't like to show it.
- Jay Kennedy Harris as Charlie – Charlie is a bit of a nerd. He is one of those boys that nobody hates, but he is nobody's close friend either. His school mates don't understand Charlie. He is the boy who meditates rather than mucking around. He is a bit out there which draws him to the Ainsworth sisters, who are also outsiders in their own way.
- Gerry Connolly as Mr Griffith – Headmaster Griffiths is an avuncular, likeable headmaster who would rather avoid a problem than confront it. He is constantly trying to calm Haiwyn Sinclaire down about the mysterious Ainsworth girls.
- Stella Silagy as Mattie – Mattie pals up with Hazel and is loyal to her new friend, even though she thinks she's a little weird. While many of the other kids in school think Mattie is a bit of a nerd because she likes science and isn't a social butterfly, Hazel appreciates Mattie's loyalty and friendship. Mattie is very supportive and would do pretty big things to help Hazel.
- Julie Forsyth as Haiwyn Sinclaire (aka Miss Sinclair) – Haiwyn Sinclaire is the deputy head of Ainsbury School and the art teacher. A keen follower of the 'ghostly other side' Haiwyn knows there is something very different about the Ainsworth sisters but can't put her finger on it. She'd like to find a reason to expel them, but the sisters always manage to outwit her.
- Julie Eckersley as Agatha Heggleby – Agatha is Rebecca, Sophie and Hazel's ghost guardian. This motorcycle riding ghost is flamboyant, outrageous and just a little scatter-brained. She has set up 'home' with her ghostly friends, Buddy, Sophus and Grendel, in the Ainsworth family graveyard. Agatha and the ghostly friends are always there for the sisters but sometimes their advice can be a little 'out of this world'.

== Production ==
The show is Produced by Burberry Productions and Coolabi Productions in association with the ABC and the BBC, as well as Screen Australia and Film Victoria. It was filmed on location at Ripponlea and at La Bassa (a mansion in Melbourne) and Ruyton Girls' School.

Stephen Maxwell Johnson directed nine episodes, while Wayne Blair directed the other four.

== Pilot ==
In 2003, Nickelodeon UK ordered a pilot to the show which was shot entirely in Britain. Nickelodeon did not pick the series up and it was pitched to the BBC, who came on board. Subsequently, the ABC and Nickelodeon Germany became involved and the series was filmed in Australia with a different cast. The show also had a slightly different setup and a slight difference in character personalities. Footage from the pilot is available on YouTube.

== Episodes ==
The thirteen episodes are as follows:

| No. | Title | Original release date |
|---|---|---|
| 1 | "150 Years Later" | 15 March 2010 |
The girls arrive as living ghosts. Because they lived in the Victorian times, they are not used to the 21st century and talk and act in an old-fashioned way. They meet their guardian, Agatha, and her group, Buddy, Grendell and Sophus. They are dead ghosts and they guide the sisters with their problems. The sisters soon become friends with Jonathan and meet David, who Rebecca has a crush on and the spoilt Christine and her friends.
| 2 | "Dying to Belong" | 16 March 2010 |
Still attempting to settle into life as "living ghosts" the sisters begin to discover the modern advantages to their new environment. Desperate to fit in, Rebecca identifies Christine and her friends as the route to popularity.
| 3 | "Sisters in Mind" | 17 March 2010 |
Rebecca wants to become a player for the girls' basketball team, though does not know how to play and goes to ask Hazel for help, however she is busy with her science project which concerns frogs. When they arrive in the court, Sophie turns out to be brilliant at it despite never playing it before. Meanwhile, Hazel has started hearing people's thoughts, causing her to release the frogs for the science project.
| 4 | "Gold" | 18 March 2010 |
Hazel learns that her old friend and sheep herder from her old life was jailed for thieving gold, she summons up him to try to discover the truth to win her legal case in an English class and help her friend pass on to the after-death.
| 5 | "Law of the Jungle" | 19 March 2010 |
Sophie finds out that her best friend Charlie and some other people too are being bullied into doing someone's homework and when Sophie finds out who that is, she is shocked and she and her sisters and Jonathon try to put it right.
| 6 | "The Baharee" | 20 March 2010 |
It is Culture week. Rebecca chooses to do drama, Sophie chooses art and Hazel and Jonathan choose dance. Everyone is enjoying themselves until a box is opened containing a pipe or a horn. When Christine blows on it she unleashes a spirit called the Baharee which forces people to do things they wouldn't normally do.
| 7 | "Hazel's Tree" | 23 March 2010 |
Hazel is distraught to learn that a peppercorn tree that she planted with her mother as a young girl is to be torn down to make way for a new hydraulic water pump. Posing as an unwashed, energy saving environmentalist, Hazel starts a campaign intent on educating the school on all things "green". Meanwhile, Sophie has a struggle on her hands to convert her peers into literary lovers. In the end, she starts her own book club with Buddy, Sophus and Grendell.
| 8 | "Reliving History" | 24 March 2010 |
It is a day at Ainsbury High that acts out life 150 years ago. This pleases the girls. It is also Sophie's Birthday. Christine and her gang are put as being Rebecca's servants, which pleases her, and Jonathan and David are put as Rebecca's suitors, which pleases Jonathan, even though Rebecca only has eyes for David. Therefore, Jonathan is the only suitor to give Rebecca a suitable visiting card. But Rebecca ends up hurting Jonathan's feelings, but all is resolved at the end. Also, Agatha goes searching for the perfect present for Sophie, which is her horse, Splendour, whom Sophie rides at the end of the episode. Hazel becomes a convict instead of a sister, the part which Christine gets in the end, and therefore Hazel does things which she normally never does.
| 9 | "A Friend Indeed" | 25 March 2010 |
Jonathan learns that he is to miss out on a trip to Beijing that he wanted to go for thanks to someone with money. Sophie finds she is good at running which makes her popular and breaking the school record. Rebecca doesn't believe that Sophie is more popular than her. Sophie tries to help Jonathan by winning some money in a race for him but she loses the race (decreasing the amount of friends she gained) because she told Agatha (who was running with her) that she was using her powers to make her run fast.
| 10 | "Grendel's Cold" | 26 March 2010 |
With nowhere to go for mid-year vacation, the Ainsworths are forced to spend the break in school. Agatha's also away, and Sophus, Grendel and Buddy choose to keep them company...and run amok in school grounds. And Grendel reveals that she actually died en route to battle after coming down with a cold...that has come back to haunt her every year since. Even worse, the school bus breaks down, forcing the other students back to the school...which means that Grendel's cold gets out of hand when Rebecca rubs it in Christine's face.
| 11 | "Smoke and Mirrors" | 27 March 2010 |
Rebecca is failing every subject, angering the ghost council. She finds she is almost disappearing. Everyone is working on their science projects in this episode, including magic, a fashion show and a sleeping bag/shoulder bag.
| 12 | "Love's First Kiss" | 30 March 2010 |
A painting of one of Rebecca's suitors is brought to Ainsbury High making Heathcliffe the suitor jump out of the portrait putting Jonathan in there instead and going in pursuit of Rebecca. Heathcliffe has some unfinished business said Agatha but was it unfinished business or was it just the touch of Rebecca's touch that made him come alive and out of the painting?
| 13 | "Old Ghosts" | 31 March 2010 |
Sophie is upset to hear that the old stables are to be knocked down. An old ghost is unleashed who proceeds to possess her. But Sophie discovers what is most important not the leaf she carved but the only family she has alive and with her.

== Release ==
The show first aired in Australia on ABC1 on 5 April 2010.

== DVD releases ==
The ABC released a DVD of Dead Gorgeous featuring the first seven episodes, with a second DVD later released with the remaining episodes.

| Title | Region 4 release date | Episodes |
|---|---|---|
| Dead Gorgeous – Volume 1 | 25 June 2010 | "150 Years Later"; "Dying to Belong"; "Sisters in the Mind"; "Gold"; "Law of the Jungle"; "Baharee"; "Hazel's Tree" |
| Dead Gorgeous – Volume 2 | 28 September 2010 | "Reliving History"; "A Friend Indeed"; "Grendel's Cold"; "Smoke and Mirrors"; "Love First Kiss"; "Old Ghosts" |

== International broadcasts ==
| Country | Channel | Series Premiere |
|---|---|---|
| Australia | ABC1 / ABC3 | 5 April 2010 |
| Belgium | Ketnet | 15 December 2010 |
| Canada | BBC Kids | |
| Germany | Nickelodeon | 30 April 2010 |
| Ireland | RTÉ2 | 2010 |
| Israel | Arutz HaYeladim | 25 November 2010 |
| Italy | Disney Channel / Rai Gulp | 2 January 2011 |
| Norway | NRK Super / NRK 3 | 16 March 2011 |
| Russia | Kultura | 19 December 2011 |
| Sweden | SVTB | 27 March 2011 |
| United Kingdom | BBC2 / CBBC | 15 March 2010 |
| Vietnam | HTV3 | 24 September 2012 |
| Latin America | HBO Family / Yups Channel / Once TV México | 4 March 2013 |

== See also ==
- List of ghost films
