= Inside the Firestorm =

2010 documentary film

- Directed by: Jacob Hickey
- Written by: Jacob Hickey
- Produced by: Alex West; Lucy Maclaren
- Narrated by: Hugo Weaving
- Cinematography: Alan Cole; Jaems Grant; Simon Ozolins; Peter Zakharov
- Edited by: Steven Robinson
- Release date: 2010
- Running time: 73 minutes
- Country: Australia
- Language: English

Inside the Firestorm is a 2010 documentary film written and directed by Jacob Hickey. It was a look back at the Black Saturday bushfires. Hickey interviewed eight families who survived and told their stories through the interviews, file footage and survivors own footage. It also explored the factors that lead severity of the blazes. It aired on the ABC on the first anniversary of the fires.

== Awards ==
- 2010 Australian Film Institute Awards
  - Best Direction in a Documentary - Jacob Hickey - won
  - Best Editing in a Documentary - Steven Robinson - won
  - Best Sound in a Documentary - Tristan Meredith, Jock Healy, A.J. Bradford - won
  - Best Feature Length Documentary - Lucy Maclaren and Alex West - nominated
