= Tangle (TV series) =

2009–2012 Australian TV series

- Current intertitle for Tangle.
- Genre: Drama
- Created by: John Edwards; Imogen Banks; Fiona Seres
- Written by: Fiona Seres; Tony McNamara; Judi McCrossin
- Directed by: Jessica Hobbs; Matthew Saville; Stuart McDonald; Emma Freeman; Michael James Rowland
- Starring: Justine Clarke; Ben Mendelsohn; Catherine McClements; Matt Day; Kat Stewart; Joel Tobeck; Don Hany; Eva Lazzaro; Blake Davis; Lincoln Younes; Kick Gurry
- Theme music composer: Bryony Marks
- Country of origin: Australia
- Original language: English
- No. of seasons: 3
- No. of episodes: 22 (list of episodes)

Production
- Executive producers: Hugh Marks (Southern Star); Kim Vecera (Showtime)
- Producers: John Edwards; Imogen Banks
- Production locations: Melbourne; Kew, Abbotsford, Collins Street, Melbourne
- Editors: Steve Evans; Peter Carrodus
- Running time: 50–55 minutes
- Production company: Southern Star

Original release
- Network: Showcase
- Release: 1 October 2009 – 29 April 2012

Tangle is an Australian drama series for the Showcase subscription television channel. It focuses on the tangled lives of two generations of two families. Tangle was filmed in Melbourne and first screened on 1 October 2009. It is written by Fiona Seres, Tony McNamara and Judi McCrossin, and directed by Jessica Hobbs, Matthew Saville and Stuart McDonald. There were three seasons.

== Plot ==
=== Season 1 ===
Tangle revolves around the intertwined lives of the Kovac and Williams families and their network of friends and extended family in and around Kew in Melbourne. Nat Manning (Kat Stewart) returned to her home town of Melbourne after ten years in the United Kingdom on the minor celebrity circuit. She created ripples and then waves in the lives of two clans already struggling under the weight of their myriad secrets. Ally (Justine Clarke) is the devoted wife of an aggressive and arrogant builder Vince (Ben Mendelsohn), mother of Romeo and Gigi (Lincoln Younes and Eva Lazarro), who is happy to have her sister Nat back. Politician Tim (Joel Tobeck), now a rising star in the State Parliament of Victoria, had an affair 15 years ago with Nat, and as a result, Nat became pregnant and gave birth to Max, now 15. Tim and his wife Christine (Catherine McClements) patched up their marriage and successfully fought for custody of Max (Blake Davis) and do not welcome her return to their lives. Meanwhile Ally’s husband Vince is having a torrid affair with divorcee Em, and his friend, a doctor Gabriel (Matt Day) has a secret lust for Ally. Gigi finally informs her mum Ally of Vince's affair, which had become an open secret due to numerous slipups by Vince. Ally confronts Vince in the Windsor Hotel. Vince tries to patch up his relationship with his family. A major property deal on a hospital site had been scuppered by Tim, and he had lost his friendship with Gabriel after the latter declared his love for Ally. Vince is unexpectedly killed in a random auto accident at the end of the series, leaving a cliffhanger.

Meanwhile, the older children, who all attend the same school in Melbourne's affluent Eastern Suburbs, are bound together when Max finds the dead body of a runner, who we see stumbling off the road at Yarra Bend in Melbourne and fatally hitting his head. Rather than report the death to the police, Max texts a photo to his friends, and they take the man's wallet and keys. Romeo and his friend, also the son of a state politician, cut off one of the man's fingers as a trophy, and Romeo hides it. His little sister finds it, informs on her brother, thus implicating the parents in the coverup. The friends, egged on mainly by Romeo, locate and visit his house (where he lived alone) over several nights, until they are found there by the police and heavily questioned and cautioned. A scandal is not what parent Tim needs, as he becomes a prominent public figure as State Minister for Health (he displaces a predecessor and terminally ill friend Pat, who commits suicide). The teenagers suffer less major setbacks in the second half of the series, which focuses on Max's growing relationship with his mother, Nat, the discovery of teen sex and young love, and how to deal with their parents whose lives are falling apart.

=== Season 2 ===
With Vince now gone, Vince’s secretive brother Joe Kovac (Kick Gurry) returns hoping to become a part of a family he was never allowed into. Spiros Georgiades (Don Hany) is recruited by the party as a political adviser to Tim, and develops an attraction to Christine. Tim makes a bid for the top job of Premier, but is sidelined and then kicked out of the party after a press conference where he is too honest about the actions of his colleagues. He takes an offered executive job in Singapore to 'lay low' for a while. Ally and her children, Romeo and Gigi, appear in a new house in Bayside. Nat meets a young, successful man and Gabriel's new but short-lived girlfriend Sophie looks a lot like Ally (according to Nat).

=== Season 3 ===
Ally sheds some of love's illusions and begins to see life possibilities beyond her family and Gabriel. Both Romeo and Gigi need her less than she'd imagined, but in different ways, as they build their own lives. When Max moves away to stay with his biological mother Nat (and her sister, Ally), Christine flirts with a parallel life at odds with all previous certainties. Gabriel and Ally finally get together. Nat reconnects with the sinister Michael Chubbievsky, a suspected drug dealer. Nat's chaos is the one constant.

== Cast ==
=== Main cast ===
Actor	Role	First Episode	Last Episode
Justine Clarke	Ally Kovac	1.01	3.06
Kat Stewart	Nat Manning	1.01	3.06
Catherine McClements	Christine Williams	1.01	3.06
Joel Tobeck	Tim Williams	1.01	3.06
Matt Day	Gabriel Lucas	1.02	3.06
Don Hany	Spiros Georgiades	2.01	3.06
Blake Davis	Max Williams	1.01	3.06
Lincoln Younes	Romeo Kovac	1.01	3.06
Eva Lazzaro	Gigi Kovac	1.01	3.06
Georgia Flood	Charlotte Barker	1.01	3.06
Kick Gurry	Joe Kovac	2.01	3.06
Ben Mendelsohn	Vince Kovac	1.01	1.10
Lucia Mastrantone	Em Barker	1.01	1.09

=== Supporting cast ===
- Tony Rickards – Billy Hall
- Jane Allsop – Tanya Hicks
- Lucia Emmerichs – Ophelia Hicks
- Reef Ireland – Ned Dougherty
- Madeleine Jay – Kelly
- Alison Whyte – Nicky Barnham
- Maude Davey – Agatha

==== Season 1 ====
- John Brumpton – Bryan Dougherty
- Frank Gallacher – Pat Mahady
- Alicia Banit – Leah
- Simon Maiden – Stan/Voice of Yuri

==== Season 2 ====
- Adam Zwar – Huey Moss
- Leah Vandenberg – Elle Rosenthal
- Todd MacDonald – Paul
- Tim Draxl – Conrad
- Fiona Harris – Sophie
- Ryan Corr – Isaac

==== Season 3 ====
- Dan Wyllie – Michael Chubievsky
- Michael Clarke-Tokely – Luke Wintle
- Elena Mandalis – Miss Papas
- Nicholas Bell – Sean Roscoe
- Ben Schumann – Harvey

=== Notable guest cast ===
- Luke Hemsworth as John (2 episodes, 2009)
- Kate Jenkinson as Melanie (5 episodes, 2009–2012)
- Lliam Amor as Robert Barker (2 episodes, 2009)
- Tony Nikolakopoulos as Gordon (3 episodes, 2009–2010)
- Richard Sutherland as Jason (1 episode, 2009)
- Marta Kaczmarek as Psychic (1 episode, 2010)
- Alin Sumarwata as Julie (1 episode, 2010)
- Kevin Harrington as Ian (1 episode, 2012)
- John Flaus as Cemetery Keeper (1 episode, 2012)
- Jason Agius as Romeo Fighter Mate (1 episode, 2012)
- Toby Truslove as Josh Gray (1 episode, 2012)
- Liddy Clark as Dr Taylor (1 episode, 2012)

== Production ==
Showcase renewed Tangle for a third series on 12 December 2010 and production began in June 2011, ending in August.

Tangle is filmed in and around the city of Melbourne, usually set within the more affluent suburbs of the city. The new house in which Ally and her children move to in season three is in Black Rock, and Tim and Christine's house is in Kew. Some other locations that have been used to film throughout the series are: Studley Park, Yarra Bend Park, Prahran, Abbotsford Convent, Parliament House, Hotel Windsor, Melbourne, Spring Street, Carlton, Abbotsford, North Melbourne, Malvern East (Ally's house in Series 1), and Camberwell (Nazareth House, Cornell St Camberwell - Romeo's school).

== Broadcast ==
Tangle was rerun on Foxtel's SoHo in Australia. In the Republic of Ireland, the series was broadcast on RTÉ Two. It was shown in numerous countries throughout the Asia–Pacific on Australia Network. In New Zealand, it was broadcast on TV One. In Poland, it was screened on Viacom Blink!. In Canada, it aired on Super Channel.

The series was never broadcast in the United Kingdom, but did however become available to stream on Amazon Prime Video from 5 April 2019. It is also available to stream on Scottish service STV Player which is accessible throughout the UK. The series is also available to stream via Amazon Prime Video in the United States, It began streaming on Netflix in Australia on 7 June 2021.

== Awards and nominations ==
Year	Award	Category	Nominee(s)	Result	Ref(s)
2010	AACTA Awards	Best Lead Actress in a Television Drama	Catherine McClements	Won	
2010	AACTA Awards	Best Lead Actress in a Television Drama	Justine Clarke	Nominated	
2010	AACTA Awards	Best Television Drama Series	Tangle (Season 2)	Nominated	
2010	AACTA Awards	Best Screenplay in Television	Fiona Seres (for 2x5)	Nominated	
2010	AACTA Awards	Best Direction in Television	Emma Freeman (for 2x6)	Nominated	
2013	AACTA Awards	Best Television Drama Series	Tangle (season 3)	Nominated	
2010	ASTRA Awards	Most Outstanding Drama	Tangle (Season 1)	Nominated	
2010	ASTRA Awards	Most Outstanding Performance by an Actor: Male	Ben Mendelsohn	Won	
2010	ASTRA Awards	Most Outstanding Performance by an Actor: Female	Justine Clarke	Won	
2010	ASTRA Awards	Most Outstanding Performance by an Actor: Male	Matt Day	Nominated	
2010	ASTRA Awards	Most Outstanding Performance by an Actor: Female	Catherine McClements	Nominated	
2010	ASTRA Awards	Best New Talent	Eva Lazzaro	Nominated	
2011	ASTRA Awards	Most Outstanding Drama	Tangle (Season 2)	Nominated	
2011	ASTRA Awards	Most Outstanding Performance By An Actor: Male	Don Hany	Nominated	
2011	ASTRA Awards	Most Outstanding Performance by an Actor: Female	Justine Clarke	Nominated	
2011	ASTRA Awards	Most Outstanding Performance by an Actor: Female	Catherine McClements	Won	
2013	ASTRA Awards	Most Outstanding Drama	Tangle (Season 3)	Won	
2013	ASTRA Awards	Most Outstanding Performance By An Actor: Male	Lincoln Younes	Won	
2013	ASTRA Awards	Most Outstanding Performance By An Actor: Male	Dan Wyllie	Nominated	
2013	ASTRA Awards	Most Outstanding Performance By An Actor: Female	Justine Clarke	Nominated	
2013	ASTRA Awards	Most Outstanding Performance By An Actor: Female	Catherine McClements	Won	
2013	ASTRA Awards	Most Outstanding Performance By An Actor: Female	Eva Lazzaro	Nominated	
2010	Australian Director' Guild Awards	Best Direction in a Television Drama Series	Stuart McDonald (for 1x9)	Won	
2010	IF Awards	"Out of the Box" Award	Eva Lazzaro	Nominated	
2011	IF Awards	"Out of the Box" Award	Blake Davis	Nominated	
2010	Logie Awards	Most Outstanding Drama Series, Miniseries or Telemovie	Tangle (Season 1)	Nominated	
2010	Logie Awards	Most Outstanding Actor	Ben Mendelsohn	Nominated	
2010	Logie Awards	Most Outstanding Actress	Justine Clarke	Nominated	
2010	Logie Awards	Most Outstanding Actress	Kat Stewart	Nominated	
2010	Logie Awards	Most Outstanding New Talent	Eva Lazzaro	Nominated	
2011	Logie Awards	Most Outstanding Actress	Justine Clarke	Nominated	
2011	Logie Awards	Most Popular Actor	Don Hany (also for Offspring)	Nominated	
2013	Logie Awards	Most Outstanding Drama Series	Tangle (Season 3)	Nominated	
2013	Logie Awards	Most Outstanding Actress	Catherine McClements	Nominated	
2010	NSW Premier's Literary Awards	Script Writing	Fiona Seres (for 1x1)	Nominated	
2010	Screen Music Awards	Best Television Theme	Bryony Marks	Nominated	
2010	Screen Music Awards	Best Music in a Television Series or Serial	Bryony Marks (for 1x1)	Nominated	
2011	Screen Music Awards	Best Music in a Television Series or Serial	Bryony Marks (for 2x6)	Nominated	

== Home media ==
DVD title	Date Released	No. of Discs	ACB rating	Runtime	Distributor
Series 1	15 April 2010	3	M	534 minutes	Roadshow Entertainment
Series 2	18 November 2010	2	MA15+	303 minutes	Roadshow Entertainment
Series 3	3 October 2012	2	MA15+	317 minutes	Roadshow Entertainment
Series 1–3	5 December 2012	7	MA15+	1154 minutes	Roadshow Entertainment
Seasons 1–3 (repackaged)	21 April 2021	7	MA15+	1154 minutes	Via Vision
