= Eva Lazzaro =

Australian actress

- Born: 23 June 1995 (age 30); Melbourne, Australia
- Occupation: Actor
- Years active: 2002–present

Eva Lazzaro is an Australian actress. She is perhaps best known for her roles as Caylin-Calandria in the 2006 film Jindabyne and Stacey in the 2009 film Blessed.

== Biography ==
Her first role was a guest spot in the television series Blue Heelers in 2002. She has also had minor parts in Underbelly and Nightmares and Dreamscapes. She has a main role as Gigi Kovac in the drama Tangle and a recurring role as Zoe in the children's show The Elephant Princess. Lazzaro has been nominated for a 2010 TV Week Logie Award, for a Graham Kennedy Award for Outstanding New Talent, and also for an ASTRA award in a similar category.

Lazzaro debuted as a director with the short film Alice's Baby, based on her own experience with her mother's miscarriage. The film's entrance into Tropfest saw her become the youngest female finalist at the festival.

== Filmography ==
=== Film ===
Year	Title	Role	Notes
2006	Jindabyne	Caylin-Calandria	
2009	Blessed	Stacey	
2012	Jack & Lily	Lily	Short
2012	Ricochet		Short
2013	The Turning	Marie	Segment: "Fog"
2016	Joe Cinque's Consolation	Bronwyn	
2018	The Last Time I Saw You	Hayley	Short
20??	Into the Black Water	April	Short, post-production

=== Television ===
Year	Title	Role	Notes
2002, 2005	Blue Heelers	Lisa Robbins, Sandy	Episodes: "The Last Jar", "My Way"
2006	Nightmares & Dreamscapes: From the Stories of Stephen King	The Girl	Episode: "Crouch End"
2008	Underbelly	Roberta's Daughter	Episodes: "Luv U 4 Eva" "Wise Monkeys", "Suffer the Children", "Scratched"
2008–09	The Elephant Princess	Zoe	Recurring role (series 1)
2009	Satisfaction	Cassandra	Episode: "Sheik Your Body"
2009–2012	Tangle	Gigi Kovac	Main role
2010	The Pacific	Isabel	Episode: "Melbourne"
2012	Miss Fisher's Murder Mysteries	Marie Wild	Episode: "Queen of the Flowers"
2013	It's a Date	Lucy	Episode: "How Important Is a Sense of Humour on a Date?"
2017	Seven Types of Ambiguity	Rebecca	Episode: "Gina"
