= Justine Clarke =

Australian actress and singer

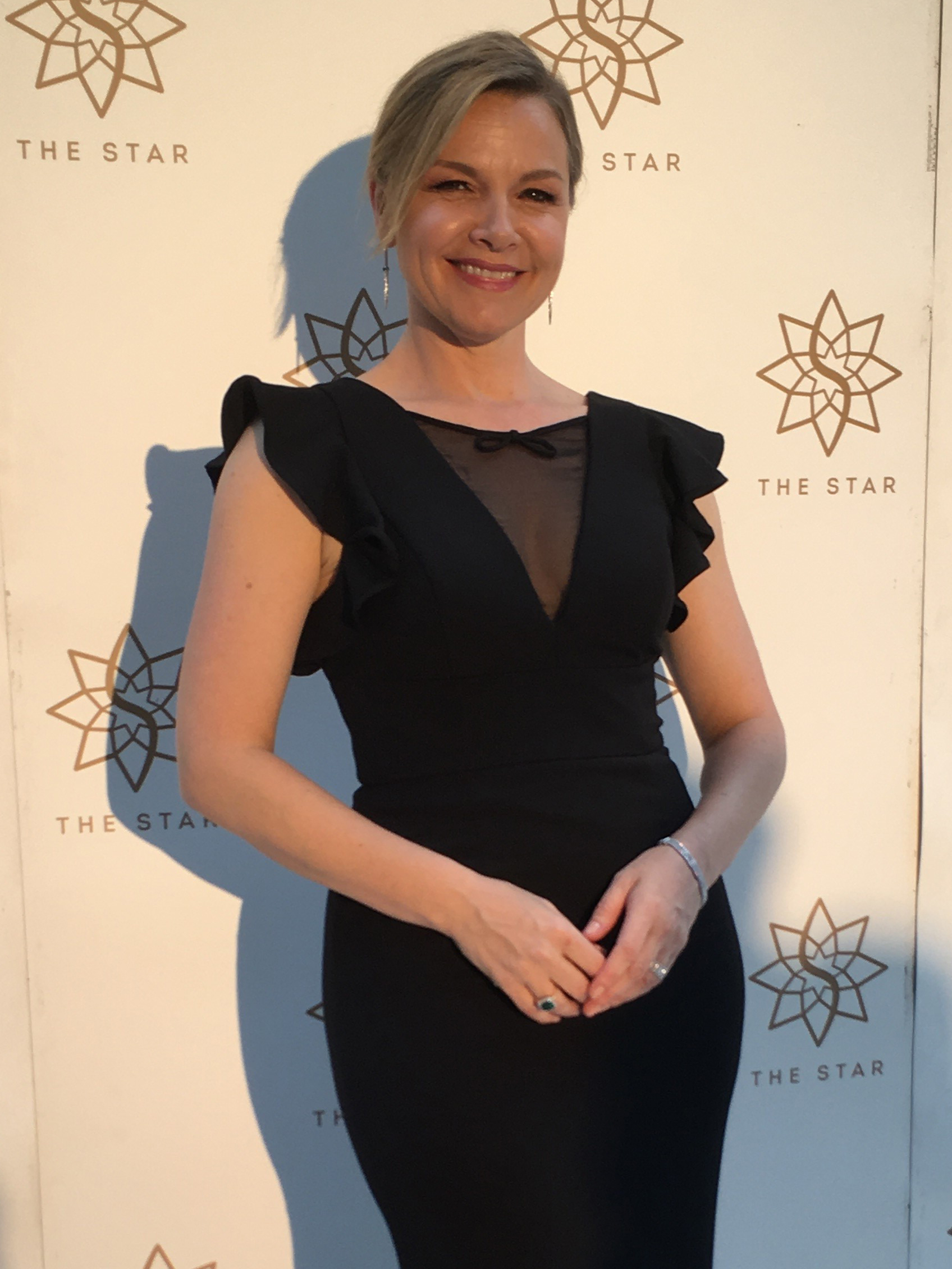
- Clarke at the 2018 ARIA Awards in Sydney
- Born: 1971 (age 54–55); Sydney, New South Wales, Australia
- Occupations: Actress; singer; television host; author
- Years active: 1978–present
- Notable work: Home and Away (1988–89); Tangle (2009–12); Play School (1999–); Look Both Ways
- Spouse: Jack Finsterer (m. 1999)
- Children: 3
- Website: www.justineclarke.com.au

Justine Clarke (born 1971) is an Australian actress, singer, author and television host.

Clarke has been acting since the age of seven and has appeared in some of Australia's best known television shows. She is best-known for her portrayal as Roo Stewart on the soap opera Home and Away (1988–1989), as Ally Kovac on the drama series Tangle (2009–2012), and as a presenter on the Australian children's show Play School, a role which she has held since 1999. She is also a film and stage actor, and won the Best Actress Award at the Mar del Plata International Film Festival in Argentina in 2006 for her role in independent film Look Both Ways. She has won two ARIA Awards.

== Early life and education ==
Clarke was born in Sydney, New South Wales to Beverley (née Levine), a dancer, seamstress and actress, and Leonard Clarke, a publican. They separated when Clarke was eight-months old after which she was raised by her mother.

At the age of seven, while attending Woollahra Public School with other up and coming talents like Mouche Phillips and Deni Hines, she began appearing in television commercials, one of which was Arnott's Humphrey B. Bear biscuits. At eleven, she played the role of Brigitta in the stage musical, The Sound of Music.

== Film and television ==
Clarke's first significant acting role was as the character Anna Goanna in the 1985 film Mad Max Beyond Thunderdome. The same year, she appeared in the TV series The Maestro's Company and featured in the 1986 mini-series Professor Poopsnaggle's Steam Zeppelin. The following year, she made appearances in A Country Practice and Willing and Abel.

Clarke appeared in a telemovie Touch the Sun, by the Australian Children's Television Foundation

In 1987, Clarke began filming an eighteen months role on the soap opera, Home and Away, as one of 17 original cast members, playing the character of Ruth "Roo" Stewart. The character of Roo was reinstated in the cast list in 2010, portrayed by Georgie Parker, making the character of Roo one of only two remaining original characters in the series (along with Ray Meagher's character of Alf Stewart). Clarke was one of several Home and Away cast-members to star in an early stage musical about the soap, which toured the UK in 1991.

Following her departure from Home and Away in 1989, Clarke appeared in the short-lived series Family and Friends before going on to act in several mini-series including Come In Spinner and Golden Fiddles.

Clarke's film Turning April in 1996 was followed by Blackrock in 1997, in which Heath Ledger played his first credited feature film role. More recently she has starred in the films Danny Deckchair and Look Both Ways. The role of Meryl Lee in Look Both Ways scored Clarke a nomination for an Australian Film Institute (AFI) Lead Actress award in 2005.

In 1999, Clarke became a presenter on long-running ABC Kids television program, Play School.

The first time I stepped onto that set I felt like I was a child again and I had climbed into the television! I remember feeling slightly nervous about meeting old pros like Jemima and Big Ted, but they were very warm and welcoming and just the same as they are on the show.

— Justine Clarke, on becoming a Play School presenter

After appearing in three episodes of the series Wildside, she played Dr Samantha O'Hara in 21 episodes of All Saints. She also played the leading role in the Australian medical drama The Surgeon and appeared in the third season of the critically acclaimed Australian TV drama series Love My Way, as Simone.

2009 saw Clarke star in the Showcase television series Tangle. In 2012, she appeared in Woodley. Other television appearances followed, including playing the role of Bernadette in The Time of Our Lives from 2013 to 2014; Eve in House Husbands in 2016, and as Noelene Hogan in Hoges.

In 2010, Clarke starred in the short film Peekaboo.

Clarke created and starred in the popular children's television series The Justine Clarke Show!.

On September 19, 2024, Clarke was announced as part of the cast for the ABC comedy series Fisk.

On 17 April 2025, Clarke was named as part of the extended cast for ABC series Return To Paradise. On 15 November 2026, Clarke was named in the cast for ABC series Shakedown. Clarke would play Colleen Taylor, the woman who brought the Robodebt scandal to the forefront and to the public.

== Theatre ==
An experienced stage actor, Clarke has worked with the Sydney Theatre Company in productions such as A Man with Five Children, Trelawny of the Wells, Cyrano de Bergerac, The Herbal Bed, Hedda Gabler, Stiffs and Muriel's Wedding.

In February–March 2022, Clarke starred in Dennis Kelly's one-woman play, Girls & Boys. The play is staged by State Theatre Company South Australia at the Odeon Theatre, Norwood in Adelaide as part of the Adelaide Festival, and directed by the artistic director of STCSA, Mitchell Butel.

In 2023 and 2024, she performed the almost-solo play Julia, about the life of Australian prime minister Julia Gillard, receiving high praise from critics. On 25 September, it was announced that Clarke would again perform as Julia for the 2025 Queensland Theatre season.

== Music ==
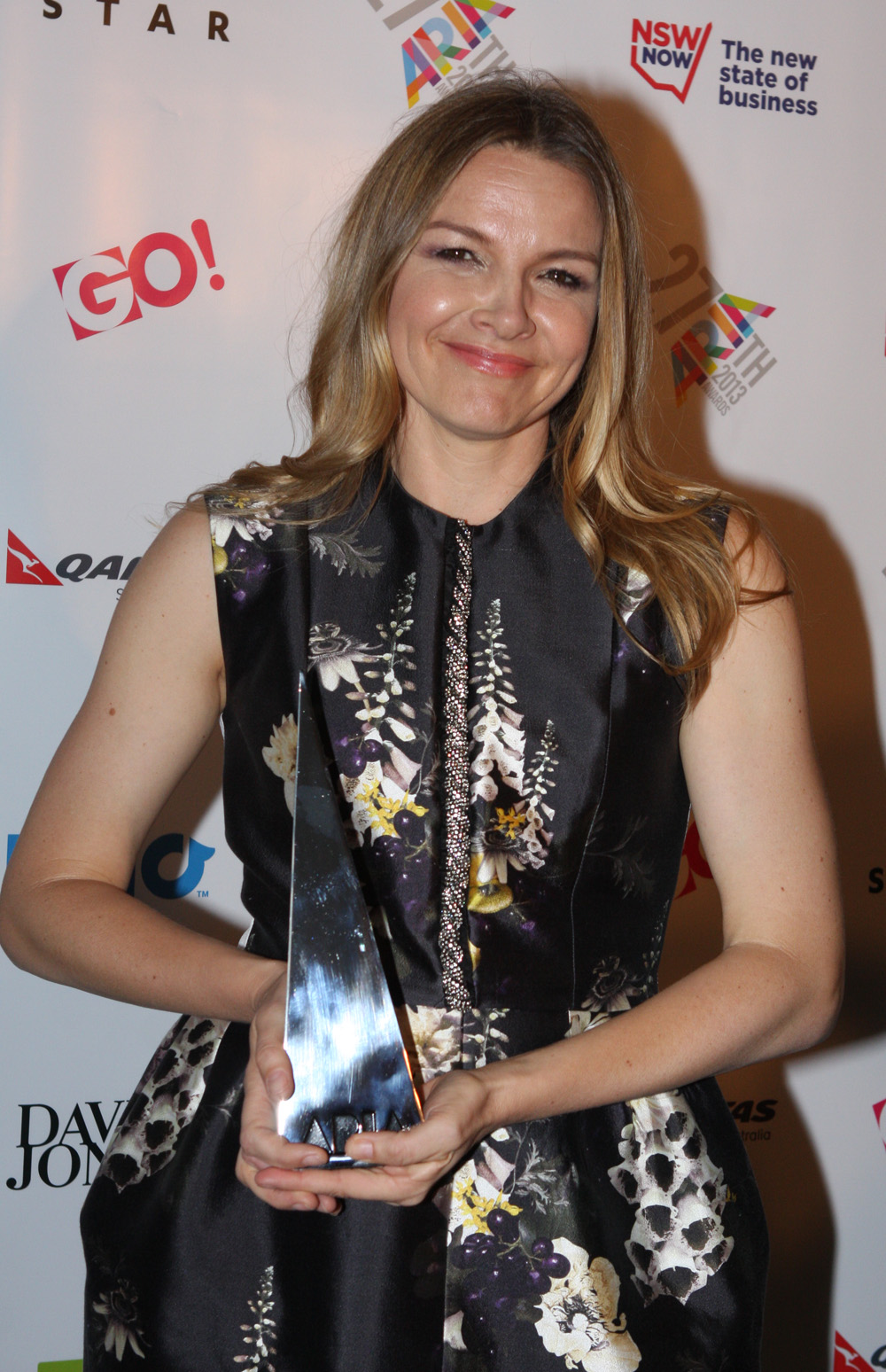
Justine Clarke at the 2013 ARIA Awards

In the 1990s, Clarke performed in a number of bands with fellow Australian thespians, including Loene Carmen and Noah Taylor. These groups included the country and western combo The Honky Tonk Angels; punk band The White Trash Mamas; and the avant-garde Cardboard Box Man. In the late '90s, she was a backing vocalist in the Sydney band Automatic Cherry, which also featured The Cruel Sea guitarist James Cruickshank. The band released the album Slow Burner in 1997.

Clarke has released multiple albums through ABC Music and has twice won the ARIA Award for Best Children's Album, in 2013 for A Little Day Out With Justine Clarke and in 2018 for The Justine Clarke Show!.

In 2014, Clarke teamed up with Tex Perkins for series of shows paying tribute to Lee Hazlewood and Nancy Sinatra.

In 2016, Clarke collaborated with singer-songwriter Josh Pyke on 'Words Make The World Go Around', a song to celebrate, promote and raise funds for the work of the Indigenous Literacy Foundation.

Clarke's first-ever, career-spanning greatest hits collection, Everybody Roar! The Best of Justine Clarke, was released in November 2019. In 2019, she released her first ever original Christmas song, "Here Comes a Merry Christmas", written with longtime collaborators Peter Dasent and Arthur Baysting.

Clarke is also a jazz vocalist and cabaret singer, popular on the Sydney club circuit.

== Discography ==
| Title | Details | Certification |
|---|---|---|
| I Like to Sing | Released: 2005; Label: ABC Music (301253-2); Format: CD, digital download | ARIA: Platinum |
| Songs to Make You Smile | Released: 2008; Label: ABC Music (301457-2); Format: CD, digital download | ARIA: Gold |
| Carnival of the Animals (with Jay Laga'aia & Georgie Parker) | Released: 2009; Label: ABC Classics (4763686); Format: 2xCD, digital download | |
| Great Big World | Released: 2010; Label: ABC Music (301562-2); Format: CD, digital download | |
| A Little Day Out with Justine Clarke | Released: 2012; Label: ABC Music (3711139); Format: CD, digital download | |
| Pyjama Jam! | Released: 2 October 2015; Label: ABC Music (4751809); Format: CD, digital download | |
| Ta Da! | Released: November 2017; Label: ABC Music (6709422); Format: CD, digital download; re-released as The Justine Clarke Show | |
| Everybody Roar! The Best of Justine Clarke | Released: November 2019; Label: ABC Music (0826256); Format: CD, digital download; Note: Greatest hits album | |

== Personal life ==
Clarke married actor Jack Finsterer in 1999. They have three children.

== Filmography ==
=== Film ===
| Year | Title | Role | Notes |
|---|---|---|---|
| 1985 | Mad Max Beyond Thunderdome | Anna Goanna | Feature film |
| 1988 | Touch the Sun: Princess Kate | Kate McLelland | TV film |
| 1990 | Come In Spinner | Monnie Malone | TV film |
| 1990 | Family and Friends | Cheryl Brooks | TV film |
| 1996 | Turning April | Rosa | Feature film |
| 1997 | Blackrock | Tiffany | Feature film |
| 1998 | Never Tell Me Never | Anna | TV film |
| 2000 | Bootmen | Kim | Feature film |
| 2003 | Danny Deckchair | Trudy Dunphy | Feature film |
| 2003 | Japanese Story | Jane | Feature film |
| 2003 | Car Park | Renee | Short film |
| 2004 | Go Big | Gina Katz | TV film |
| 2004 | The Brush-Off | Salina | TV film |
| 2005 | Look Both Ways | Meryl Lee | Feature film |
| 2007 | In the Company of Actors | Herself | Documentary film |
| 2008 | The List | Amy | Short film |
| 2008 | 8 | Mother | Segment: "The Water Diary" |
| 2009 | In Her Skin | Irene | TV film |
| 2011 | Peekaboo | Jillian | Short film |
| 2011 | Spider Walk | Angela | Short film |
| 2013 | The Humble Beginnings of the Balloon | Narrator (voice) | Short film |
| 2014 | Healing | Michelle | Feature film |
| 2014 | Maya the Bee | Miss Cassandra (voice) | Animated feature film (English version) |
| 2015 | A Month of Sundays | Wendy | Feature film |
| 2016 | Red Dog: True Blue | Diane Carter | Feature film |
| 2018 | Maya the Bee: The Honey Games | Queen (voice) | Animated feature film (English version) |
| 2021 | Maya the Bee: The Golden Orb | Queen (voice) | Animated feature film (English version) |

=== Television ===
| Year | Title | Role | Notes |
|---|---|---|---|
| 1984 | The Maestro's Company | Tina | TV series |
| 1986 | Professor Poopsnagle's Steam Zeppelin | Carmen | TV series |
| 1986 | Willing and Abel | | TV series |
| 1987 | A Country Practice | Nicki Simpson | TV series, 5 episodes |
| 1988–89 | Home and Away | Roo Stewart | TV series, seasons 1 & 2 |
| 1994 | Golden Fiddles | Liddy Powell | TV miniseries |
| 1994 | Tracks of Glory | Kate O'Brien | TV miniseries |
| 1996 | Twisted | Pip | TV series. episode: "The Crossing" |
| 1998 | Wildside | Jessie Roscoe / Jessie Armstrong | TV series, 3 episodes: "1.11", "1.12", "1.32" |
| 1998–1999 | All Saints | Dr. Samantha O'Hara | TV series, seasons 1–2 |
| 2000–present | Play School | Presenter | TV series |
| 2001 | Head Start | Julia Hunter | TV series, episode: "Seeing Is Believing" |
| 2005 | The Surgeon | Dr. Eve Agius | TV series |
| 2005 | Good Morning Australia | Guest - Herself | TV series, 1 episode |
| 2007 | Love My Way | Simone | TV series |
| 2007 | Bastard Boys | Janine McSwain | TV miniseries |
| 2007 | Chandon Pictures | Samantha | TV series, episode: "Back to School" |
| 2009–12 | Tangle | Ally Kovac | TV series, seasons 1–3 |
| 2012 | Woodley | Em | TV series |
| 2013–14 | The Time of Our Lives | Bernadette Flynn | TV series |
| 2014 | It's a Date | Amy | TV series, episode: "What's the Worst Thing That Can Happen on a Date?" |
| 2015 | Gallipoli | Mrs. Johnson | TV miniseries |
| 2015 | House Husbands | Eve | TV series, season 4 |
| 2016 | Rake | Alli Franklin | TV series, episode: "4.2" |
| 2016 | Have You Been Paying Attention? | Guest Quiz Master | TV series |
| 2017 | Hoges: The Paul Hogan Story | Noelene Hogan | TV miniseries |
| 2017 | The Justine Clarke Show | Herself | TV longseries |
| 2018 | Who Do You Think You Are? | Herself | TV series, season 9, episode 5 |
| 2018 | Dead Lucky | Erica Hodge | TV series, season 1, episodes 1 & 2 |
| 2019 | Get Krackin | Herself | TV series, season 2, episode 1 |
| 2019 | Squinters | Jess | TV series, season 2 |
| 2020 | Australia Come Fly With Me | Presenter | TV documentary miniseries on Australian civil aviation, 3 episodes |
| 2020 | Hungry Ghosts | Clare Nguyen | TV series, season 1 |
| 2021 | Mr Inbetween | Meaghan Clarke | TV series, season 3, episode 6 |
| 2021–present | RFDS: Royal Flying Doctor Service | Leonie Smith | TV series, season 1-3 |
| 2022 | Barrumbi Kids | Mrs Armstrong | TV series, 10 episodes |
| 2023 | Turn Up The Volume | Sandy | TV series, 1 episode |
| 2023 | Wildlife ER | Narrator | SBS TV series |
| 2023 | C*A*U*G*H*T | Dr Mitchell | 1 episode |
| 2024 | Fisk | Melissa | TV series, 3 episodes |
| 2025 | Return to Paradise | Stephanie Brisbane | TV series, 1 episode (Killer Set) |
| 2026 | Shakedown | Colleen Taylor | TV mini series |

== Theatre ==
| Year | Title | Role | Venue / Company |
|---|---|---|---|
| 1982 | The Sound of Music | Brigitta | |
| 1991 | Home and Away: The Musical | Roo Stewart | UK tour |
| 1992 | Murderer | | Karnak Playhouse |
| 1996 | Live Acts on Stage | | Stables Theatre |
| 1996 | Stiffs | | Wharf Theatre for Sydney Theatre Company |
| 1997 | The Herbal Bed | | Wharf Theatre for Sydney Theatre Company |
| 1999 | Cyrano de Bergerac | | Wharf Theatre for Sydney Theatre Company |
| 2000 | Trelawny of the Wells | | Playhouse, Melbourne & Sydney Opera House for Sydney Theatre Company |
| 2002 | A Man with Five Children | | Wharf Theatre for Sydney Theatre Company |
| 2003 | Dreaming Transportation | | Lennox Theatre, Parramatta |
| 2004 | Fast | | Mitchell Centre, Darwin |
| 2004 | Hedda Gabler | | Wharf Theatre for Sydney Theatre Company |
| 2005 | Parramatta Girls | | Belvoir Street Theatre for Company B's Winter Play Reading Series |
| 2005 | Colder Than Here | | Belvoir Street Theatre |
| 2005 | Love Letters | | Parade Theatre |
| 2006 | Hedda Gabler | | Brooklyn Academy of Music (BAM) for Sydney Theatre Company |
| 2006 | Jackie Orszaczky's Sunday Skool | Abby Dobson | Sydney Opera House |
| 2006 | Reunion / A Kind of Alaska | | Wharf Theatre for Sydney Theatre Company |
| 2007 | I Like to Sing with Justine Clarke | Self | Sydney Opera House |
| 2007 | Toy Symphony | | Belvoir St Theatre for Company B |
| 2008 | Gala | | Southbank Theatre |
| 2009 | The Wonderful World of Dissocia | | Wharf Theatre for Sydney Theatre Company |
| 2012 | Les Liaisons Dangereuses | | Wharf Theatre for Sydney Theatre Company |
| 2012 | Justine Clarke: Pop Up Tour | Self | Sydney Opera House |
| 2014 | Children of the Sun | | Sydney Opera House |
| 2017 | Justine Clarke's Look! Look! It's a Gobbledygook | Self | Sydney Opera House |
| 2017-18 | Muriel's Wedding | Betty Heslop | Roslyn Packer Theatre for Sydney Theatre Company & Global Creatures |
| 2018 | Justine Clarke Silly Songs | Self | Sydney Opera House, Hamer Hall, Melbourne, Regal Theatre, Perth, Canberra Theatre, QPAC, Thebarton Theatre |
| 2022 | Girls & Boys | Woman | Odeon Theatre, Norwood at Adelaide Festival for State Theatre Company South Australia |
| 2023–present | Julia | Julia Gillard | Aus tour |

== Awards and nominations ==
=== Music ===
==== ARIA Music Awards ====
| Year | Nominee / work | Award | Result |
|---|---|---|---|
| 2006 | I Like to Sing | Best Children's Album | Nominated |
| 2008 | Songs to Make You Smile | Best Children's Album | Nominated |
| 2010 | Great Big World | Best Children's Album | Nominated |
| 2013 | A Little Day Out with Justine Clarke | Best Children's Album | Won |
| 2016 | Pyjama Jam | Best Children's Album | Nominated |
| 2018 | The Justine Clarke Show! | Best Children's Album | Won |
| 2025 | Mimi's Symphony | Best Children's Album | Nominated |

==== AIR Awards ====
| Year | Nominee / work | Award | Result |
|---|---|---|---|
| 2026 | Mimi's Symphony | Best Independent Children's Album or EP | Nominated |

=== Acting ===
| Year | Nominee / work | Award | Result |
|---|---|---|---|
| 2005 | Look Both Ways | AFI Award for Best Lead Actress in a Television Drama | Nominated |
| 2006 | Look Both Ways | Mar del Plata International Film Festival Best Actress Award | Won |
| 2012 | Les Liaisons Dangereuses | Helpmann Award for Best Female Actor in a Supporting Role in a Play | Nominated |
