= 2006 Australian Film Institute Awards =

48th edition of film awards

48th Australian Film Institute Awards
- Date: 5–6 December 2006
- Site: Melbourne Exhibition Centre
- Hosted by: Geoffrey Rush
- Produced by: Paul Dainty

Highlights
- Best Film: Ten Canoes
- Best Direction: Rolf de Heer, Peter Djigirr; Ten Canoes
- Best Actor: Shane Jacobson; Kenny
- Best Actress: Emily Barclay; Suburban Mayhem
- Supporting Actor: Anthony Hayes; Suburban Mayhem
- Supporting Actress: Susie Porter; The Caterpillar Wish
- Most awards: Ten Canoes (6)
- Most nominations: Suburban Mayhem (12)

Television coverage
- Network: Nine Network

The 48th Annual Australian Film Institute Awards ceremony, honouring the best in Australian cinema and television of 2006, took place on 6 and 7 December 2006 at the Melbourne Exhibition Centre and was broadcast on the Nine Network. The main awards presenter lineup included Cate Blanchett, Heath Ledger, Eric Bana, Daniel Radcliffe, Sam Neill and Baz Luhrmann.

The nominations were announced in October 2006 at the Sydney Theater by Richard Roxburgh, Justine Clarke and AFI president, James Hewison. Suburban Mayhem received twelve nominations, closely followed by jindabyne with nine. A new award for Best Visual Effects was introduced in this year.

During the awards ceremony, which was hosted by Geoffrey Rush, the Australian Film Institute presented Australian Film Institute Awards (commonly referred to as AFI Awards) in 40 categories including feature films, television, animation, and documentaries. Ten Canoes, the first ever movie entirely filmed in Australian Aboriginal languages, won the most awards, taking six from its seven nominations and the Byron Kennedy Award for its director Rolf de Heer.

== Winners and nominees ==
=== Feature Film ===
Best Film	Best Direction
Ten Canoes – Julie Ryan, Rolf de Heer; Candy – Margaret Fink, Emile Sherman; Jindabyne – Catherine Jarman; Kenny – Clayton Jacobson, Rohan Timlock	Rolf de Heer, Peter Djigirr – Ten Canoes; Ray Lawrence – Jinabyne; Clayton Jacobson – Kenny; Paul Goldman – Suburban Mayhem
Best Original Screenplay	Best Adapted Screenplay
Rolf de Heer – Ten Canoes; Alice Bell – Suburban Mayhem; Shane Jacobson, Clayton Jacobson – Kenny; Murali K. Thalluri – 2:37	Luke Davies, Neil Armfield – Candy; Beatrix Christian – Jindabyne; Reg Cribb – Last Train to Freo; Ana Kokkinos, Andrew Bovell – The Book of Revelation
Best Lead Actor	Best Lead Actress
Shane Jacobson – Kenny; Gabriel Byrne – Jindabyne; Heath Ledger – Candy; Steve Le Marquand – Last Train to Freo	Emily Barclay – Suburban Mayhem; Abbie Cornish – Candy; Laura Linney – Jindabyne; Teresa Palmer – 2:37
Best Supporting Actor	Best Supporting Actress
Anthony Hayes – Suburban Mayhem; Tom Budge – Last Train to Freo; Ronald Jacobson – Kenny; Geoffrey Rush – Candy	Susie Porter – The Caterpillar Wish; Deborra-Lee Furness – Jindabyne; Noni Hazlehurst – Candy; Genevieve Lemon – Suburban Mayhem
Best Cinematography	Best Editing
Ian Jones ACS – Ten Canoes; Will Gibson – Macbeth; Robert Humphreys ACS – Suburban Mayhem; David Williamson – Jindabyne	Tania Nehme – Ten Canoes; Dany Cooper ASE – Candy; Stephen Evans – Suburban Mayhem; Clayton Jacobson, Sean Lander – Kenny
Best Original Music Score	Best Sound
Mick Harvey – Suburban Mayhem; John Clifford White – Macbeth; Paul Kelly, Dan Luscombe – Jindabyne; Cezary Skubiszewski – The Book of Revelation	James Currie, Tom Heuzenroeder, Michael Bakaloff, Rory McGregor – Ten Canoes; Liam Egan, Phil Judd, Steven Jackson-Vaughan – Suburban Mayhem; Frank Lipson, John Wilkinson – Macbeth; Andrew Plain, Peter Grace, Nada Mikas, Peter Miller, Linda Murdoch, Robert Sullivan – Jindabyne
Best Production Design	Best Costume Design
David McKay – Macbeth; Robert Cousins – Candy; Beverley Freeman – Ten Canoes; Nell Hanson – Suburban Mayhem	Jane Johnston – Macbeth; Anna Borghesi – The Book of Revelation; Melinda Doring – Suburban Mayhem; Phill Eagles – Kokoda

=== Television ===
Best Drama Series: Love My Way: Series 2 – John Edwards, Claudia Karvan, Jacquelin Perske (Foxtel); All Saints: Series 9 – MaryAnne Carroll (Seven Network); Blue Heelers: Series 13 – Gus Howard, David Clarke (Seven Network); McLeod's Daughters: Series 6 – Karl Zwicky, Posie Graeme-Evans (Nine Network)	Best Miniseries or Telefeature: RAN – Penny Chapman (SBS); Answered by Fire – Roger Le Mesurier, Andrew Walker (ABC); The Silence – Jan Chapman (ABC); The Surgeon – John Edwards, Judi McCrossin (Network Ten)
Best Comedy Series: The Chaser's War on Everything – Mark Fitzgerald, Julian Morrow, Andy Nehl (ABC); Comedy Inc. The Late Shift: Series 4 – David McDonald (Nine Network); Supernova – David Maher, David Taylor, Beryl Vertue, Sue Vertue (Foxtel)	Best Light Entertainment Television Series: Enough Rope with Andrew Denton: Series 4 – Anita Jacoby, Andrew Denton (ABC); RocKwiz: Series 2 – Brian Nankervis, Ken Connor, Peter Bain-Hogg, Joe Connor (SBS); Spicks and Specks: Series 2 – Bruce Kane, Anthony Watt (ABC); The Glass House: Season 6 – Ted Robinson (ABC)
Children's Television Drama: Mortified – Phillip Bowman, Bernadette O'Mahony (Nine Network); Blue Water High: Series 2 – Noel Price, Dennis Kiely (ABC); Deadly – Suzanne Ryan (Nine Network); The Upside Down Show – Michael Bourchier (Nickelodeon)	Best Direction in Television: Answered by Fire – Jessica Hobbs (ABC); Comedy Inc. The Late Shift: Series 4, Episode 7 – David McDonald (Nine Network); Love My Way: Series 2, Episode 11 "Five Minutes of Fame" – Shirley Barrett (Foxtel); Mortified: Episode 1 "Taylor's DNA" – Pino Amenta (Nine Network)
Best Lead Actor – Drama: David Wenham – Answered by Fire (ABC); Dan Wyllie – Love My Way: Series 2 (Foxtel); Charles Passi – RAN (SBS); Richard Roxburgh – The Silence (ABC)	Best Lead Actress – Drama: Susie Porter – RAN (SBS); Asher Keddie – Love My Way: Series 2 (Foxtel); Claudia Karvan – Love My Way: Series 2 (Foxtel); Justine Clarke – The Surgeon (Network Ten)
Best Guest or Supporting Actor – Drama: Marcus Graham – Blue Heelers: Series 13 (Seven Network); John Waters – All Saints: Series 9 (Seven Network); Aaron Fa'aoso – RAN (SBS); Luke Carroll – RAN (SBS)	Best Guest or Supporting Actress – Drama: Saskia Burmeister – Blue Heelers: Series 13 (Seven Network); Margaret Harvey – RAN (SBS); Merwez Whaleboat – RAN (SBS); Emily Barclay – The Silence (ABC)
Best Performance in a Television Comedy: Andrew Hansen – The Chaser's War on Everything (ABC); Genevieve Morris – Comedy Inc. The Late Shift: Series 4 (Nine Network); Paul McCarthy – Comedy Inc. The Late Shift: Series 4 (Nine Network); Kris McQuade – Supernova (Foxtel)	Best Screenplay in Television: RAN: Episode 5 "Blue Hawaii" – Sue Smith (SBS); Love My Way: Series 2, Episode 11 "Five Minutes of Fame" – Jacquelin Perske (Foxtel); Mortified: Episode 1 "Taylor's DNA" – Angela Webber (Nine Network); The Chaser's War on Everything: Series 1, Episode 9 – (ABC)
AFI Award for Outstanding Achievement in Television Screen Craft: The Forest (for Cinematography) – Joseph H. Pickering; Comedy Inc. The Late Shift: Series 4 (for Cinematography) – Rob Meyer; RAN (for Cinematography) – Ian Jones ACS; RocKwiz (for Sound) – Tim Millikan, Michael Letho and Stephen Witherow

=== Non-Feature Film ===
Best Documentary	Best Direction in a Documentary
Hunt Angels – Sue Maslin; Raul The Terrible – Carlos Alperin; Vietnam Nurses – Beth Frey, Lizzette Atkins; Welcome 2 My Deaf World – Sally Ingleton	Raul The Terrible – David Bradbury; Hunt Angels – Alec Morgan; Unfolding Florence: The Many Lives of Florence Broadhurst – Gillian Armstrong; Vietnam Nurses – Polly Watkins
Best Cinematography in a Documentary	Best Editing in a Documentary
Hunt Angels – Jackie Farkas; He's Coming South – Steve Williams; Penicillin: The Magic Bullet – James Grant; Transit – Anthony Davison	Raul The Terrible – Stewart Young ASE; The Archive Project – Uri Mizrahi; The Black Road – Lawrie Silvestrin; Vietnam Nurses – Tony Stevens
Best Sound in a Documentary	Best Short Fiction Film
Vietnam Nurses – Livia Ruzic, Mark Tarpey, Keith Thomas, John Willsteed; Rampage – Nick Meyers; The Archive Project – Martin Friedel, Andrew Plain, Keith Thomas, Emma Bortignon; Unfolding Florence: The Many Lives of Florence Broadhurst – Annie Breslin, Gethin Creagh, Paul Finlay, Paul Grabowsky	Stranded – Stuart McDonald; Small Boxes – Rene Hernandez; The 9:13 – Matthew Phipps; The Desert – Glendyn Ivin
Best Short Animation	Best Screenplay in a Short Film
Gargoyle – Michael Cusack; Carnivore Reflux – Eddie White, James Calvert; The Astronomer – Kate McCartney; The Safe House – Lee Whitmore	Stranded – Kathleen O'Brien; A Natural Talent – Louise Fox; Paper and Sand – Matt Rubinstein, Ian Kennedy Williams; The Safe House – Lee Whitmore
AFI Award for Outstanding Achievement in Short Film Screen Craft
Stranded (for Acting) – Emma Lung; A Natural Talent (for Acting) – Skye Wansey; End of Town (for Cinematography) – Adam Arkapaw; Gargoyle (for Production Design) – JoAnne Bouzianis-Sellick, Greg Sweeney

=== Additional Awards ===
International Award for Excellence in Filmmaking	News Limited Readers' Choice Award
Memoirs of a Geisha (Cinematography) – Dion Beebe ACS; The Chronicles of Narnia: The Lion, the Witch and the Wardrobe (Cinematography) – Donald McAlpine ACS; The Chronicles of Narnia: The Lion, the Witch and the Wardrobe (Production Design) – Roger Ford; The World's Fastest Indian (Producing / Direction / Screenplay) – Roger Donaldson	Heath Ledger
Best Young Actor	Best Visual Effects
Marny Kennedy – Mortified; Frank Sweet – 2:37; Christian Byers – Opal Dream; Mia Wasikowska – Suburban Mayhem	Hunt Angels – Rose Draper, Mike Seymour; Kokoda – Phil Stuart-Jones; Unfolding Florence: The Many Lives of Florence Broadhurst – Simon Rippingale, Tim Richter, Nina Gibbs; Wicked Science: Series 2, Episode 1 "The Flies" – Barry Lanfranchi, James Maclachlan, Vanessa Magyar
International Award for Best Actor	International Award for Best Actress
Heath Ledger – Brokeback Mountain; Eric Bana – Munich; Hugo Weaving – V for Vendetta; Anthony LaPaglia – Winter Solstice	Rachel Griffiths – Six Feet Under; Toni Collette – In Her Shoes; Naomi Watts – King Kong; Radha Mitchell – Silent Hill

=== Individual Awards ===
Award	Winner
Byron Kennedy Award	Rolf de Heer
Raymond Longford Award	Ian Jones (Writer / Producer / Director)

== Multiple nominations ==
The following films received multiple nominations.

- 12 nominations: Suburban Mayhem
- 9 nominations: Jindabyne
- 7 nominations: Ten Canoes and Candy
- 6 nominations: Kenny
- 5 nominations: Macbeth
