= Anthony Hayes (actor) =

Australian actor (born 1977)

- Born: 21 September 1977 (age 49); Brisbane, Queensland, Australia
- Other name: Tony Hayes
- Occupation: Actor
- Years active: 1986–present
- Spouse: Polly Smyth
- Children: 2
- Website: anthony-hayes.net

Anthony Hayes (born 21 September 1977) is an Australian actor, best known for his roles in War Machine, The Light Between Oceans, The Slap, Look Both Ways, The Boys, Rabbit-Proof Fence, Animal Kingdom and soap opera Paradise Beach.

== Career ==
Apart from acting in numerous films and television shows, he also wrote, directed and produced the films Ten Empty (2008), New Skin (2002) and Sweet Dreams (2002), Ten Empty had its world premiere at the Sydney Film Festival (2008). The screenplay was nominated for 2007 Queensland Premier's Literary Awards and 2008 Victorian Premier's Literary Award. New Skin (2002) won the Dendy Award at the 2002 Sydney Film Festival and won Hayes an IF Award as best emerging director. Sweet Dreams (2002) was voted most popular film by the audience at the St Kilda Film Festival in 2003. Hayes also earned AFI and Film Critics Circle award nominations for The Boys.

Hayes received AFI and Film Critics Circle award nominations for best supporting actor in The Square (2009), and won the AFI Award for Best Supporting Actor for Look Both Ways (2005) and Suburban Mayhem (2006).

He was a co-founder of Rogue Stars Productions with fellow actors Brendan Cowell and Leland Kean in 1999.

Although primarily a screen actor, Hayes does voice over work as well.

Joel Edgerton nicknamed him 'The King of Western Grit' during the shooting of The Square, The moniker later became the name of a Facebook page, with a collection of movie posters with Hayes' face on them.

Anthony co-wrote the film Gold with writer Polly Smyth. It stars Zac Efron, Susie Porter and himself. He directed and produced it through his company Rogue Star Pictures. The film was shot in South Australia in 2020.

Hayes appeared in all three series of ABC political drama Total Control.

In 2023, Hayes was announced as part of the cast for controversial two part miniseries Warnie in the role of Terry 'TJ' Jenner. The decision to produce the miniseries about Warne after his death was criticised by Warne's daughter Brooke who described it as "beyond disrespectful". The trailer for the miniseries also attracted negative commentary on social media when it was first shown on 31 May 2023. The telemovie garnered mostly negative reviews from the press and public.

== Activism ==
In April 2015, Hayes, with his partner, writer Polly Smyth, organised the #saveourboys video featuring celebrities including: Bryan Brown, Guy Pearce, Geoffrey Rush, Joel Edgerton, Luke Hemsworth, Brendan Cowell and Peter Helliar. The video called upon Australian Prime Minister Tony Abbott to step up and secure the lives of reformed drug smugglers Andrew Chan and Myuran Sukumaran in the last 24 hours before their execution. In the video, Hayes himself said: "show some ticker Tony Abbott. Get to Indonesia. It's your job." The video went viral and amassed much support on social media. Despite many stating the government had done all it could leading up to their deaths, it was later claimed by human rights lawyer Geoffrey Robertson QC that a number of avenues could have been taken.

== Filmography ==
=== Feature films ===
Year	Film	Role	Notes
2024	Better Man	Chris Briggs	
2022	Gold	Keith	with Zac Efron, Susie Porter
2019	Danger Close: The Battle of Long Tan	Colonel Colin Townsend	
2017	Cargo	Vic Carter	with Martin Freeman, Caren Pistorius
2017	War Machine	Lt. Commander Pete Duckman	
2016	The Light Between Oceans	Vernon Knuckey	with Michael Fassbender, Alicia Vikander, Rachel Weisz
2014	Redfern Now: Promise Me		with Wayne Blair, Daniela Farinacci, Lisa Flanagan
2014	Healing	Warren	with Hugo Weaving, Don Hany, Xavier Samuel
2014	The Rover	Soldier 1	with Guy Pearce, Robert Pattinson & Scoot McNairy
2013	The Broken Shore	Rick Hopgood	with Don Hany, Claudia Karvan
2012	Jack Irish: Bad Debts	Vin McKillop	with Guy Pearce, Marta Dusseldorp, Aaron Pedersen
2012	The King Is Dead!	Escobar	with Roman Vaculik, Michaela Cantwell, Lily Adey
2012	Beaconsfield	Pat Ball	with Shane Jacobson, Lachy Hulme, Cameron Daddo
2011	Burning Man	Brian	with Matthew Goode, Rachel Griffiths, Bojana Novakovic
2010	Beneath Hill 60	Captain William McBride	with Jacqueline McKenzie, Brendan Cowell & Steve Le Marquand
2010	Animal Kingdom	Detective Justin Norris	with Guy Pearce, Luke Ford, Joel Edgerton & Mirrah Foulkes
2009	Prime Mover	Salesman / Mechanic – Business Man / Foreman	with Michael Dorman, Emily Barclay, Ben Mendelsohn & Gyton Grantley
2008	The List	Dale	with Nicole da Silva, Nash Edgerton & Kieran Darcy-Smith
2008	The Square	Greg "Smithy" Smith	with David Roberts, Joel Edgerton & Claire van der Boom
2008	Newcastle	Danny	with Lachlan Buchanan & Rebecca Breeds
2007	West	Kenwood	with Khan Chittenden & Gillian Alexy
2006	Suburban Mayhem	Kenny	with Emily Barclay, Michael Dorman & Robert Morgan
2005	Look Both Ways	Andy Walker	with William McInnes & Justine Clarke
2004	Get Rich Quick	Spud	with Marshall Napier
2003	Ned Kelly	Sergeant Kennedy	with Joel Edgerton
2002	Heroes' Mountain	Woody	with Craig McLachlan
2002	Rabbit-Proof Fence	The Fence Builder	with Everlyn Sampi, Tianna Sansbury, Kenneth Branagh
2000	Bootmen	Huey	with Sam Worthington & Adam Garcia
1998	The Sugar Factory	Marlo	with Matt Day, Marshall Napier & Sam Healy
1998	The Boys	Stevie Sprague	with David Wenham & Toni Collette

=== Short films ===
Year	Film	Role	Notes
2024	Edge of the Earth	Joshua	Short
2012	Dumpy Goes to the Big Smoke	Portly	with Eden Falk, Emily Tomlins
2008	Bleeders	Harmless	with Joe Bugner, Robert Mammone
2006	The Bridge		with Haitham Al'Maan, Anna Cato, Rayne Coram
2005	The Mechanicals	LX Man	with Anthony Phelan, Justin Smith (Australian actor)
2005	The Heartbreak Tour	Tim	with Toby Schmitz
2003	Alice	Ben	
2002	New Skin	Max	with Jessica Napier & Marshall Napier

=== TV ===
Year	Film	Role	Notes
2026	Run	Brian	TV series: 3 episodes
2025	NCIS: Sydney	Luka	TV series: 1 episode
2024	The Twelve	Liam Bevan	TV series: 3 episodes
2023	Warnie	TJ Jenner	Miniseries: 2 episodes
2019-24	Total Control	Damien Bauer	TV series
2018	Mystery Road	Ryan Muller	TV miniseries, 6 episodes
2018	Strangers	Michael Cohen	Miniseries
2016	No Activity	Needy	3 episodes
2015	Gallipoli	Lieutenant Anthony Chandler	Miniseries
2014	Secrets & Lies	Ian Cornielle	TV series
2013	Mr & Mrs Murder	Ralph Alonso	TV series
2012	Bikie Wars: Brothers in Arms	Colin "Caesar" Campbell	Miniseries
2012	Devil's Dust	Bernie Banton	Miniseries
2011	The Slap	Gary	Miniseries; Equity Award for Most Outstanding Performance by an Ensemble in a Television Movie or Miniseries
2011	SLiDE	Stacey	TV series
2011	Sea Patrol	Henry	TV series
2010	Rush	Oliver Ginsberg	TV series
2010	Killing Time	John Bond	TV series
2010	Rescue: Special Ops	Zac Weston	Episode: "Shock Jock"
2010	Raw	Luke	Episode # 2.4
2008	Review with Myles Barlow	Drug Lord	Episode # 1.1 – next to Ray Jay
2007	Bastard Boys	Sean McSwain	with Colin Friels
2006	Two Twisted	Julian Knox	Episode: "Call Back"
2004	McLeod's Daughters	Jack Mcleod	Episode: "A McLeod Daughter" – with Sarah Enright & Josef Ber
2004	BlackJack: Sweet Science	Brad Anderson	with Alex O'Loughlin, Colin Friels & Vince Colosimo
2003	Fat Cow Motel	Frank Merryweather	Episode # 1.13
1995–2003	Blue Heelers	Calvin Baker	3 episodes
2002	White Collar Blue	John Santos	Episode # 1.17
2001	Tracey McBean	Shamus Wong	
2000–02	Farscape	Molnon / Wa	2 episodes: "Taking the Stone" & "I-Yensch, You-Yensch"
2001	Changi	Gordon Yates	5 episodes
1998–99	All Saints	Krys Goretski	2 episodes: "Truth and Consequences: Part 1" & "The Price You Pay"
1998	Murder Call	Eddie Lamb	Season 2, episode 13: "A Dress to Die For"
1998	Water Rats	Jarred	Episode "Heads or Tales"
1998	Wildside	Danny Thompson	Episode # 1.7
1997	Fallen Angels	Roach	3 episodes
1996	Naked: Stories of Men	Young Gibbo	Episode: "Coral Island"
1996	Twisted Tales	Damien	Episode: "Third Party"
1996	Halifax f.p.: Cradle and All	Kenny	with Peter Hardy
1995	The Last Bullet	James	
1995	Snowy River: The McGregor Saga	Zack Reilly	Episode: "The Reilly Gang"
1995	Ocean Girl	Michael "Mick" Byrne	13 episodes
1995	Correlli	Gazza	with Hugh Jackman
1995	G.P.	Alex Milanakos	Episode: "Trapped"
1995	Fire	Slasher	Episode: "Glory Days"
1993	Paradise Beach	Ritchie 'Grommet'	TV series
1992	The Adventures of Skippy	Jim Hartley	Episode: "Skippy and the Runaway"
1991	Animal Park	Damien Halliday	

=== Director, writer and producer ===
Year	Title	Notes
2022	Gold	co-writer, director & producer
2008	Ten Empty	writer, director & producer
2002	New Skin	writer, director & producer
2002	Sweet Dreams	writer, director & producer

== Awards and nominations ==
Year	Category	Award	Film	Result	Ref.
1998	Best Performance by an Actor in a Supporting Role	AFI Awards	The Boys	Nominated	
1999	Best Supporting Actor – Male	FCCA Awards	The Boys	Nominated	
2002	Best Short Film Over 15 Minutes	Sydney Film Festival	New Skin	Won	
2002	Best Rising Talent	IF Awards		Won	
2003	Audience Award – Best Film	St Kilda Short Film Festival	Sweet Dreams	Won	
2005	Best Supporting Actor	AFI Awards	Look Both Ways	Won	
2006	Best Supporting Actor	AFI Awards	Suburban Mayhem	Won	
2008	Best Supporting Actor	AFI Awards	The Square	Nominated	
2009	Best Supporting Actor	FCCA Awards	The Square	Nominated	
2012	Outstanding Performance by an Ensemble in a Television Movie or Miniseries	Equity Ensemble Awards	The Slap	Won	
2012	Best Actor in a Television Drama	Golden Nymph Awards (Monte Carlo TV Awards)	The Slap	Nominated	
2013	Most Outstanding Performance by an Ensemble in a Television Movie or Miniseries	Equity Ensemble Awards	Devil's Dust	Won	
2013	Best Actor in a Television Drama or Miniseries	AACTA Awards	Devil's Dust	Nominated	
2013	Best Actor in a Television Drama	Seoul International Drama Awards	Devil's Dust	Nominated	
2013	Silver Logie Award for Most Outstanding Actor in a Drama Series	Logie Awards	Devil's Dust	Won	
2015	Best Actor in a Television Drama	Golden Nymph Awards (Monte Carlo TV Awards)	Secrets & Lies	Won	
2018	Silver Logie for Best Supporting Actor	Logie Awards	Seven Types of Ambiguity	Nominated	
2022	Best Independent Film	Saturn Awards	Gold	Nominated	
2022	Director's Debut	Camerimage International Festival	Gold	Nominated	
