= AACTA Award for Outstanding Achievement in Short Film Screen Craft =

Former Australian film award

Outstanding Achievement in Short Film Screen Craft AACTA Award
- Country: Australia
- Presented by: Australian Academy of Cinema and Television Arts (AACTA)
- First award: 2006
- Currently held by: Nick Remy Matthews ACS, The Kiss (2010)
- Website: http://www.aacta.org

The AACTA Award for Outstanding Achievement in Short Film Screen Craft is a special award, presented by the Australian Academy of Cinema and Television Arts (AACTA). The award was presented by the Australian Film Institute (AFI), from 2006 to 2010, at the Australian Film Institute Awards (known commonly as the AFI Awards).

== Winners ==
In the following table, in 2006 winners are listed first, in boldface and highlighted in gold; those listed below the winner that are not in boldface or highlighted are the nominees; from 2007, onwards, the award was presented as a special award and those winners will be marked in a different colour.

Winner of competitive award
Winner of special award

Year	Recipient(s)	Film	Craft
**2006** (48th)	**Emma Lung**	**Stranded**	Acting
2006 (48th)	Skye Wansey	A Natural Talent	Acting
2006 (48th)	Adam Arkapaw	End of Town	Cinematography
2006 (48th)	JoAnne Bouzianis-Sellick and Greg Sweeney	Gargoyle	Production design
**2007** (49th)	**Mark Lapwood**	**Eclipse**	Cinematography
**2008** (50th)	**Xanthe Highfield**	**fOUR**	Production design
**2009** (51st)	**Andrew MacLeod**	**Water**	Cinematography
**2010** (52nd)	**Nick Remy Matthews ACS**	**The Kiss**	Cinematography

== See also ==
- AACTA Awards
