= Logie Awards of 2007 =

Australian television awards ceremony

49th Logie Awards
- Date: 6 May 2007
- Site: Crown Palladium, Melbourne, Victoria
- Hosted by: Adam Hills; Dave Hughes; Fifi Box

Highlights
- Gold Logie: Kate Ritchie
- Hall of Fame: Steve Irwin
- Most awards: Home and Away (4)
- Most nominations: Home and Away (9)

Television coverage
- Network: Nine Network

The 49th Annual TV Week Logie Awards was held on Sunday 6 May 2007 at the Crown Palladium in Melbourne, and broadcast on the Nine Network. The ceremony was hosted by Adam Hills, Dave Hughes and Fifi Box, while Hamish Blake and Andy Lee were the backstage hosts. Jules Lund, Livinia Nixon and Jackie O hosted the Red Carpet Arrivals. Special guests included Michael Weatherly, Rachel Griffiths, Jessica Alba, Michael Chiklis and Ioan Gruffud.

== Winners and nominees ==
In the tables below, winners are listed first and highlighted in bold.

=== Gold Logie ===
Most Popular Personality on Australian Television
- **Kate Ritchie in Home and Away (Seven Network)**
  - Natalie Blair in Neighbours (Network Ten)
  - Rachael Carpani in McLeod's Daughters (Nine Network)
  - John Howard in All Saints (Seven Network)
  - Simmone Jade Mackinnon in McLeod's Daughters (Nine Network)
  - Rove McManus in Rove Live (Network Ten)
  - Bert Newton in Bert's Family Feud and 20 to 1 (Nine Network)
  - John Wood in Blue Heelers (Seven Network)

=== Acting/Presenting ===
| Most Popular Actor | Most Popular Actress |
|---|---|
| **Aaron Jeffery in McLeod's Daughters (Nine Network)**; Brendan Cowell in Love My Way (W. Channel); Mark Furze in Home and Away (Seven Network); John Howard in All Saints (Seven Network); Paul O'Brien in Home and Away (Seven Network) | **Kate Ritchie in Home and Away (Seven Network)**; Natalie Bassingthwaighte in Neighbours (Network Ten); Natalie Blair in Neighbours (Network Ten); Rachael Carpani in McLeod's Daughters (Nine Network); Simmone Jade Mackinnon in McLeod's Daughters (Nine Network) |
| Most Outstanding Actor in a Series | Most Outstanding Actress in a Series |
| **Matthew Le Nevez in The Society Murders (Network Ten)**; Ben Mendelsohn in Love My Way (W. Channel); Richard Roxburgh in The Silence (ABC TV); David Wenham in Answered by Fire (ABC TV); Dan Wyllie in Love My Way (W. Channel) | **Susie Porter in RAN Remote Area Nurse (SBS TV)**; Daniella Farinacci in The Society Murders (Network Ten); Claudia Karvan in Love My Way (W. Channel); Asher Keddie in Love My Way (W. Channel); Judith McGrath in All Saints (Seven Network) |
| Most Popular New Male Talent | Most Popular New Female Talent |
| **Dustin Clare in McLeod's Daughters (Nine Network)**; Ben Lawson in Neighbours (Network Ten); Bobby Morley in Home and Away (Seven Network); Chris Sadrinna in Home and Away (Seven Network); Andrew Supanz in All Saints (Seven Network) | **Amy Mathews in Home and Away (Seven Network)**; Jolene Anderson in All Saints (Seven Network); Brooke Hanson in What's Good For You (Nine Network); Michelle Langstone in McLeod's Daughters (Nine Network); Jessica Tovey in Home and Away (Seven Network) |
| Most Outstanding New Talent | Most Popular Presenter |
| **Emma Lung in Stranded (SBS TV)**; Emily Barclay in The Silence (ABC TV); Aaron Fa'aoso in RAN Remote Area Nurse (SBS TV); Sam Parsonson in Love My Way (W. Channel); Alex Tilman in Answered by Fire (ABC TV) | **Rove McManus in Rove Live (Network Ten)**; Wil Anderson in The Glass House (ABC TV); Grant Denyer in It Takes Two (Seven Network); Melissa Doyle in Sunrise (Seven Network); David Koch in Sunrise (Seven Network) |

=== Most Popular Programs ===
| Most Popular Australian Drama Series | Most Popular Light Entertainment Program |
|---|---|
| **Home and Away (Seven Network)**; All Saints (Seven Network); Blue Heelers (Seven Network); McLeod's Daughters (Nine Network); Neighbours (Network Ten) | **Rove Live (Network Ten)**; 20 to 1 (Nine Network); Bert's Family Feud (Nine Network); Deal or No Deal (Seven Network); Thank God You're Here (Network Ten) |
| Most Popular Sports Program | Most Popular Lifestyle Program |
| **The NRL Footy Show (Nine Network)**; The AFL Footy Show (Nine Network); Before The Game (Network Ten); RPM (Network Ten); Sports Tonight (Network Ten) | **What's Good For You (Nine Network)**; Backyard Blitz (Nine Network); Better Homes and Gardens (Seven Network); Getaway (Nine Network); The Great Outdoors (Seven Network) |
Most Popular Reality Program
**Dancing with the Stars (Seven Network)**; Australian Idol (Network Ten); Big Brother (Network Ten); The Biggest Loser (Network Ten); It Takes Two (Seven Network)

=== Most Outstanding Programs ===
| Most Outstanding Drama Series, Miniseries or Telemovie | Most Outstanding Comedy Program |
|---|---|
| **Love My Way (W. Channel)**; Answered by Fire (ABC TV); RAN Remote Area Nurse (SBS TV); The Silence (ABC TV); The Society Murders (Network Ten) | **Thank God You're Here (Network Ten)**; The Chaser's War on Everything (ABC TV); The Glass House (ABC TV); Spicks and Specks (ABC TV); Stupid, Stupid Man (TV1) |
| Most Outstanding Sports Coverage | Most Outstanding News Coverage |
| **2006 FIFA World Cup Germany – Italy vs Australia (SBS TV)**; 3 Mobile Ashes Series, Second Test (Nine Network); 2006 Australian Tennis Open (Seven Network); 2006 Winter Olympics (Seven Network); 2006 Supercheap Auto Bathurst 1000 (Network Ten) | **"Sexual Abuse in Aboriginal Communities", Lateline (ABC TV)**; "Escaping the Border", ABC News (ABC TV); "Escaping the Mine", Sunrise (Seven Network); "Scully Sacking", National Nine News (Nine Network); "Sexual Abuse of the Elderly", Lateline (ABC TV) |
| Most Outstanding Children's Program | Most Outstanding Public Affairs Report |
| **The Upside Down Show (Nick Jr.)**; Blue Water High (ABC TV); Camp Orange: Slimey Hollow (Nickelodeon); H_{2}O: Just Add Water (Network Ten); Mortified (Nine Network) | **The Terri Irwin Interview (Nine Network)**; Abu Ghraib, Dateline (SBS TV); Four Days in Dili, Dateline (SBS TV); The Great Escape: Brant Webb and Todd Russell (Nine Network); The Mourning After, Australian Story (ABC TV) |
| Most Outstanding Documentary or Documentary Series | Most Outstanding Factual Series |
| **Who Killed Dr Bogle and Mrs Chandler? (ABC TV)**; The Battle of Long Tan (The History Channel); The Bridge at Midnight Trembles (SBS TV); The Floating Brothel (ABC TV); Life at 1 (ABC TV) | **Dynasties (ABC TV)**; Border Security (Seven Network); Jamie's Kitchen Australia (Network Ten); Peking to Paris (ABC TV); RPA (Nine Network) |

== Performers ==
- Avril Lavigne
- Damien Leith
- James Morrison

== Hall of Fame ==
Steve Irwin became the 24th induction into the TV Week Logies Hall of Fame posthumously.
