= The Forest (Australian film) =

- Directed by: Jo Kennedy
- Written by: Jo Kennedy; Christine Rogers
- Produced by: Clare Sawyer
- Starring: Anita Hegh
- Cinematography: Joseph Pickering
- Edited by: Jane Moran
- Music by: Marcel Borak; Robert Mackenzie
- Release date: 2003
- Running time: 52 minutes
- Country: Australia
- Language: English

The Forest is a 2003 Australian telemovie written and directed by Jo Kennedy. Originally created in 2002 it had its television premiere on the ABC in December 2005 after multiple festival appearances.

== Plot ==
Over the course of one night Ashley looks for answers after her husband Mike leaves their anniversary dinner to go back to work.

== Cast ==
- Anita Hegh as Ashley
- Julia Blake as Margot
- Tony Martin as Ben
- Peter Cummins as David
- Adam Murphy as Mike
- Sally Cooper as Margot
- Toni Scanlan as Kerry
- Alice McConnell as Monique
- Paul English as Sam
- Elena Mandalis as Tanya

== Reception ==
Russell Edwards from Variety gave it a brief review saying "Hegh hits the mark with her startled-bird perf, and Tony Martin exudes an erotic malevolence as a cheating husband. DV lensing by Joseph H. Pickering is impressive; other tech credits are solid."

== Awards ==
- 2006 AFI Awards
  - Outstanding Achievement in Television Screen Craft - Joseph Pickering for Cinematography - won
