= AACTA Award for Best Actress in a Leading Role =

Award by the Australian Academy of Cinema and Television Arts

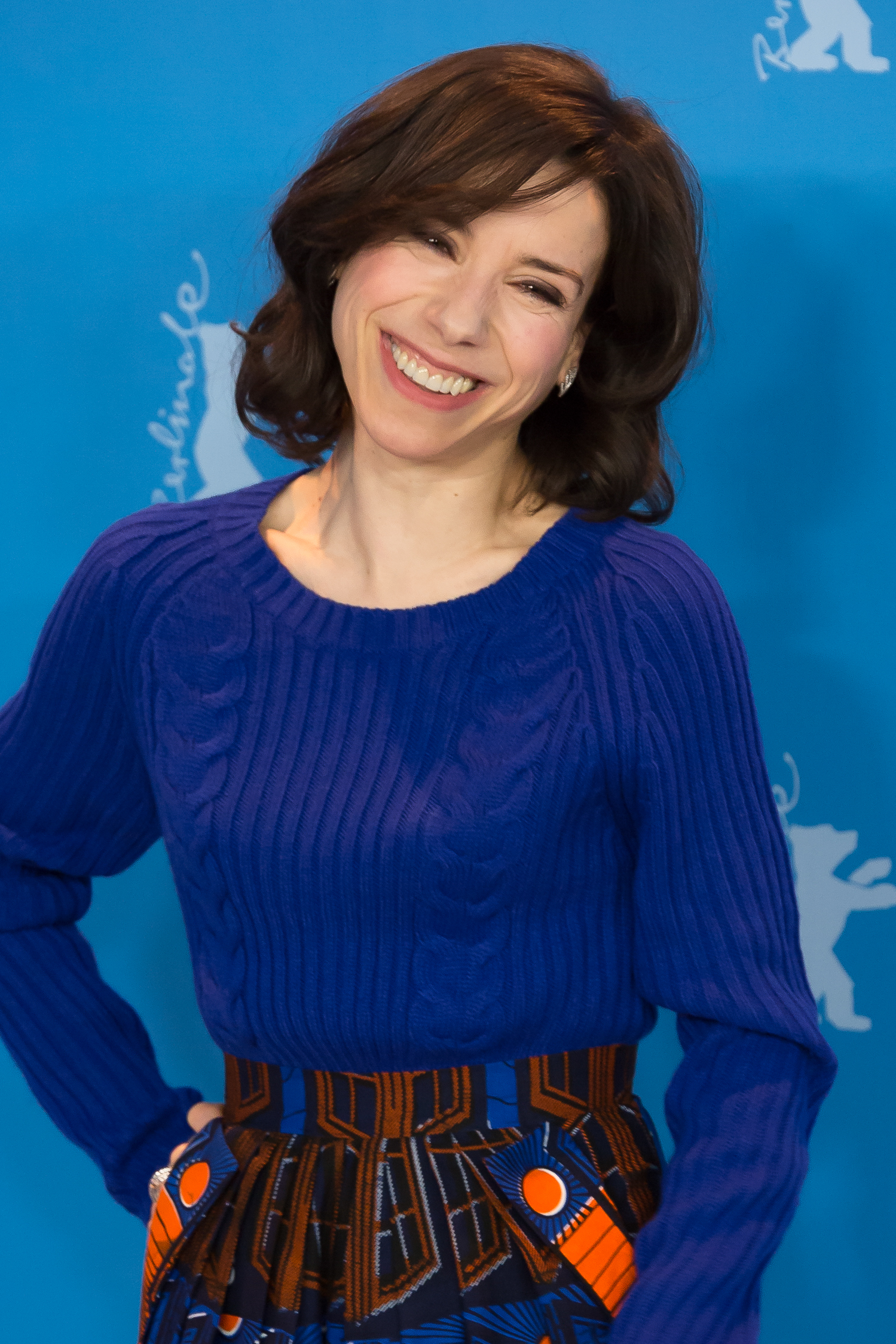
- The 2025 recipient: Sally Hawkins
- Country: Australia
- Presented by: Australian Academy of Cinema and Television Arts (AACTA)
- First award: 1971
- Currently held by: Sally Hawkins, Bring Her Back (2025)
- Website: http://www.aacta.org

The AACTA Award for Best Actress in a Leading Role is an award presented by the Australian Academy of Cinema and Television Arts (AACTA). The AACTA is a non-profit organisation, whose aim is to "identify, award, promote, and celebrate Australia's greatest achievements in film and television".

The award is presented annually at the AACTA Awards, which hands out accolades for achievements in feature films, television, documentaries, and short films. From 1971 to 2010, the category was presented by the Australian Film Institute (AFI), the academy's parent organisation, at the annual Australian Film Institute Awards (known as the AFI Awards). When the AFI launched the AACTA in 2011, it changed the annual ceremony to the AACTA Awards, with the current award being a continuum of the AFI Award for Best Actress in a Leading Role.

From 1971 to 1975, it was presented as a special award, and was accompanied with a cash prize, before it became a competitive award from 1976 onward. Judy Davis is the most nominated and winning actress in this category, with nine nominations, including six wins, most recently for her role in Nitram (2021).

Candidates for this award must be female, and cannot be nominated for the same role in the supporting actress category.

== Winners and nominees ==
In the following table, the years listed correspond to the year of film release; the ceremonies are usually held the same year.^{[A]} The actress in bold and in dark blue background have received a special award; those in bold and in yellow background have won a regular competitive award. Those that are neither highlighted nor in bold are the nominees. When sorted chronologically, the table always lists the winning actress first and then the other nominees.

Winner of a special prize (1971–1975)
Winner of a competitive award (1976–present)

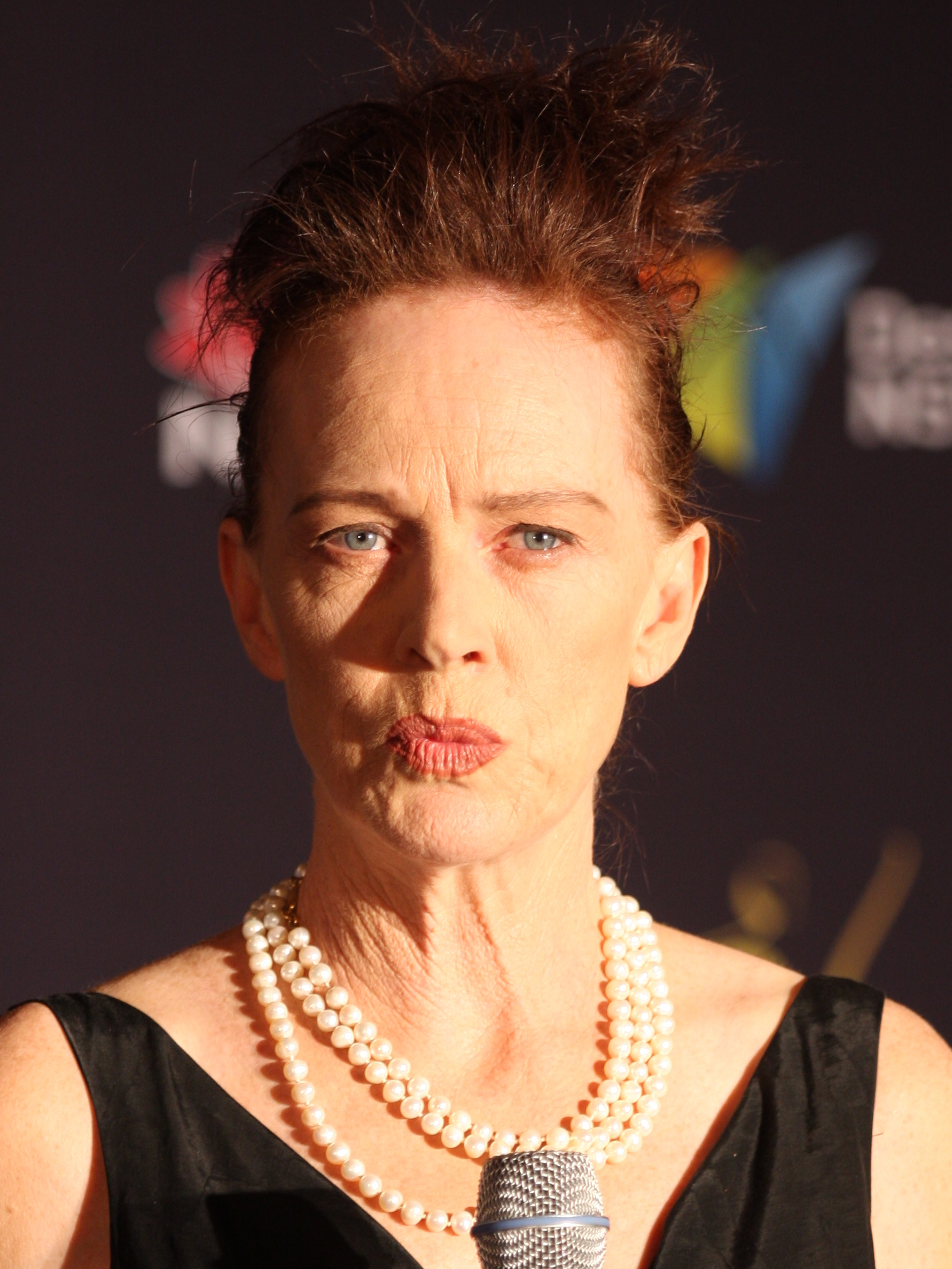
Judy Davis is the most awarded and nominated actress in this category.

=== AFI Awards ===
==== 1970s ====
Year	Actress	Film	Role
**1971** (13th)	**Monica Maughan**	**A City's Child**	**Woman**
**1972** (14th)	**Jacki Weaver**	**Stork**	**Anna**
**1973** (15th)	**Judy Morris**	**Libido: The Child**	**Sybil**
**1974–75** (16th and 17th)	**Julie Dawson**	**Who Killed Jenny Langby?**	**Jenny Langby**
**1976** (18th)	**Helen Morse**	**Caddie**	**Caddie Marsh**
**1976** (18th)	Briony Behets	The Trespassers	Penny
**1976** (18th)	Judy Morris	The Trespassers	Dee
**1976** (18th)	Helen Morse	Picnic at Hanging Rock	Mlle. de Poitiers
**1977** (19th)	**Pat Bishop**	**Don's Party**	**Jenny**
**1977** (19th)	Jeanie Drynan	Don's Party	Kath Henderson
**1977** (19th)	Sara Kestelman	Break of Day	Alice
**1977** (19th)	Robyn Nevin	The Fourth Wish	Connie
**1978** (20th)	**Angela Punch McGregor**	**The Chant of Jimmie Blacksmith**	**Gilda Marshall**
**1978** (20th)	Geraldine Fitzgerald	The Mango Tree	Grandma Carr
**1978** (20th)	Wendy Hughes	Newsfront	Amy Mackenzie
**1978** (20th)	Kim Krejus	Mouth to Mouth	Carrie
**1979** (21st)	**Michele Fawdon**	**Cathy's Child**	**Cathy**
**1979** (21st)	Ruth Cracknell	The Night the Prowler	Doris Bannister
**1979** (21st)	Judy Davis	My Brilliant Career	Sybylla Melvyn
**1979** (21st)	Sigrid Thornton	Snapshot	Madeline

==== 1980s ====
Year	Actress	Film	Role
**1980** (22nd)	**Tracy Mann**	**Hard Knocks**	**Samantha**
**1980** (22nd)	Carmen Duncan	Harlequin	Sandra Rast
**1980** (22nd)	Judy Morris	...Maybe This Time	Fran
**1980** (22nd)	Mawuyul Yanthalawuy	Manganinnie	Manganinnie
**1981** (23rd)	**Judy Davis**	**Winter of Our Dreams**	**Lou**
**1981** (23rd)	Jenny Agutter	The Survivor	Hobbs
**1981** (23rd)	Lorraine Bayly	Fatty Finn	Maggie McGrath
**1981** (23rd)	Noni Hazlehurst	Fatty Finn	Myrtle Finn
**1982** (24th)	**Noni Hazlehurst**	**Monkey Grip**	**Nora**
**1982** (24th)	Wendy Hughes	Lonely Hearts	Patricia Curnow
**1982** (24th)	Carol Kane	Norman Loves Rose	Rose
**1982** (24th)	Angela Punch McGregor	We of the Never Never	Jeannie Gunn
**1983** (25th)	**Wendy Hughes**	**Careful, He Might Hear You**	**Vanessa**
**1983** (25th)	Lorna Lesley	The Settlement	Joycie
**1983** (25th)	Kris McQuade	Buddies	Stella
**1983** (25th)	Geneviève Picot	Undercover	Libby
**1984** (26th)	**Angela Punch McGregor**	**Annie's Coming Out**	**Jessica Hathaway**
**1984** (26th)	Carol Burns	Strikebound	Agnes Doig
**1984** (26th)	Gosia Dobrowolska	Silver City	Nina
**1984** (26th)	Wendy Hughes	My First Wife	Helen
**1985** (27th)	**Noni Hazlehurst**	**Fran**	**Fran**
**1985** (27th)	Debra Byrne	Rebel	Kathy McLeod
**1985** (27th)	Lynette Curran	Bliss	Bettina Joy
**1985** (27th)	Michele Fawdon	Unfinished Business	Maureen
**1986** (28th)	**Judy Davis**	**Kangaroo**	**Harriet Somers**
**1986** (28th)	Helen Buday	For Love Alone	Teresa
**1986** (28th)	Judy Morris	The More Things Change...	Connie
**1986** (28th)	Justine Saunders	The Fringe Dwellers	Mollie Comeaway
**1987** (29th)	**Judy Davis**	**High Tide**	**Lillie**
**1987** (29th)	Julia Blake	Travelling North	Frances
**1987** (29th)	Loene Carmen	The Year My Voice Broke	Freya Olson
**1987** (29th)	Wendy Hughes	Echoes of Paradise	Maria
**1988** (30th)	**Nadine Garner**	**Mull**	**Phoebe Mullens**
**1988** (30th)	Wendy Hughes	Boundaries of the Heart	Stella Marsden
**1988** (30th)	Rosey Jones	Afraid to Dance	The Female
**1988** (30th)	Jo Kennedy	Tender Hooks	Mitch
**1989** (31st)	**Meryl Streep**	**Evil Angels**	**Lindy Chamberlain**
**1989** (31st)	Judy Davis	Georgia	Nina Bailley and Georgia White
**1989** (31st)	Geneviève Lemon	Sweetie	Dawn (Sweetie)
**1989** (31st)	Irini Pappas	Island	Marquise

==== 1990s ====
Year	Actress	Film	Role
**1990** (32nd)	**Catherine McClements**	**Weekend with Kate**	**Kate Moir**
**1990** (32nd)	Kerry Armstrong	Hunting	Michelle Harris
**1990** (32nd)	Rosanna Arquette	Wendy Cracked a Walnut	Wendy
**1990** (32nd)	Claudia Karvan	The Big Steal	Joanna Johnson
**1991** (33rd)	**Sheila Florance**	**A Woman's Tale**	**Martha**
**1991** (33rd)	Eri Ishida	Aya	Aya
**1991** (33rd)	Angie Milliken	Act of Necessity	Louise Coleman
**1991** (33rd)	Geneviève Picot	Proof	Celia
**1992** (34th)	**Lisa Harrow**	**The Last Days of Chez Nous**	**Beth**
**1992** (34th)	Claudia Karvan	Redheads	Lucy
**1992** (34th)	Tara Morice	Strictly Ballroom	Fran
**1992** (34th)	Miranda Otto	Daydream Believer	Nell Tiscowitz
**1993** (35th)	**Holly Hunter**	**The Piano**	**Ada McGrath**
**1993** (35th)	Claudia Karvan	Broken Highway	Catherine
**1993** (35th)	Jacqueline McKenzie	This Won't Hurt A Bit!	Vanessa Prescott
**1993** (35th)	Fiona Ruttelle	Say a Little Prayer	Angie
**1994** (36th)	**Toni Collette**	**Muriel's Wedding**	**Muriel Heslop**
**1994** (36th)	Tara FitzGerald	Sirens	Estella Campion
**1994** (36th)	Kerry Fox	Country Life	Sally Voysey
**1994** (36th)	Victoria Longley	Talk	Julia Strong
**1995** (37th)	**Jacqueline McKenzie**	**Angel Baby**	**Kate**
**1995** (37th)	Caroline Gillmer	Hotel Sorrento	Hilary Moynihan
**1995** (37th)	Caroline Goodall	Hotel Sorrento	Meg Moynihan
**1995** (37th)	Lisa Harrow	That Eye, the Sky	Alice Flack
**1996** (38th)	**Judy Davis**	**Children of the Revolution**	**Joan**
**1996** (38th)	Gia Carides	Brilliant Lies	Susy Connor
**1996** (38th)	Claudia Karvan	Dating the Enemy	Tash
**1996** (38th)	Frances O'Connor	Love and Other Catastrophes	Mia
**1997** (39th)	**Pamela Rabe**	**The Well**	**Hester**
**1997** (39th)	Frances O'Connor	Kiss or Kill	Nikki Davies
**1997** (39th)	Frances O'Connor	Thank God He Met Lizzie	Jenny
**1997** (39th)	Miranda Otto	The Well	Katherine
**1998** (40th)	**Deborah Mailman**	**Radiance**	**Nona**
**1998** (40th)	Cate Blanchett	Oscar and Lucinda	Lucinda Leplastrier
**1998** (40th)	Lynette Curran	The Boys	Sandra Sprague
**1998** (40th)	Rachel Griffiths	Amy	Tanya Rammus
**1999** (41st)	**Sacha Horler**	**Praise**	**Cynthia**
**1999** (41st)	Jeanie Drynan	Soft Fruit	Patsy
**1999** (41st)	Michela Noonan	Strange Fits of Passion	She
**1999** (41st)	Maya Stange	In a Savage Land	Evelyn Spence

==== 2000s ====
Year	Actress	Film	Role
**2000** (42nd)	**Pia Miranda**	**Looking for Alibrandi**	**Josephine Alibrandi**
**2000** (42nd)	Julia Blake	Innocence	Claire
**2000** (42nd)	Rachel Griffiths	Me Myself I	Pamela Drury
**2000** (42nd)	Susie Porter	Better Than Sex	Cin
**2001** (43rd)	**Kerry Armstrong**	**Lantana**	**Sonja Zat**
**2001** (43rd)	Alice Ansara	La Spagnola	Lucia
**2001** (43rd)	Nicole Kidman	Moulin Rouge!	Satine
**2001** (43rd)	Lola Marceli	La Spagnola	Lola
**2002** (44th)	**Maria Theodorakis**	**Walking on Water**	**Anna**
**2002** (44th)	Judy Davis	Swimming Upstream	Dora Fingleton
**2002** (44th)	Rachel Griffiths	The Hard Word	Carol
**2002** (44th)	Dannielle Hall	Beneath Clouds	Lena
**2003** (45th)	**Toni Collette**	**Japanese Story**	**Sandy Edwards**
**2003** (45th)	Helen Buday	Alexandra's Project	Alexandra
**2003** (45th)	Rose Byrne	The Rage in Placid Lake	Gemma Taylor
**2003** (45th)	Susie Porter	Teesh and Trude	Letitia (Teesh)
**2004** (46th)	**Abbie Cornish**	**Somersault**	**Heidi**
**2004** (46th)	Chloe Maxwell	Under the Radar	Jo
**2004** (46th)	Olivia Pigeot	A Cold Summer	Tia
**2004** (46th)	Leeanna Walsman	One Perfect Day	Alysse
**2005** (47th)	**Cate Blanchett**	**Little Fish**	**Tracy Louise Heart**
**2005** (47th)	Saskia Burmeister	Hating Alison Ashley	"Erk" Erica "Yuk" Yurken
**2005** (47th)	Justine Clarke	Look Both Ways	Meryl Lee
**2005** (47th)	Frances O'Connor	Three Dollars	Tanya
**2006** (48th)	**Emily Barclay**	**Suburban Mayhem**	**Katrina**
**2006** (48th)	Abbie Cornish	Candy	Candy
**2006** (48th)	Laura Linney	Jindabyne	Claire
**2006** (48th)	Teresa Palmer	2:37	Melody
**2007** (49th)	**Joan Chen**	**The Home Song Stories**	**Rose**
**2007** (49th)	Kerry Armstrong	Razzle Dazzle	Justine Morgan
**2007** (49th)	Brenda Blethyn	Clubland	Jean Dwight
**2007** (49th)	Franka Potente	Romulus, My Father	Christine
**2008** (50th)	**Monic Hendrickx**	**Unfinished Sky**	**Tahmeena**
**2008** (50th)	Noni Hazlehurst	Bitter & Twisted	Penelope Lombard
**2008** (50th)	Emma Lung	The Jammed	Crystal
**2008** (50th)	Veronica Sywak	The Jammed	Ashley
**2009** (51st)	**Frances O'Connor**	**Blessed**	**Rhonda**
**2009** (51st)	Marissa Gibson	Samson and Delilah	Delilah
**2009** (51st)	Sacha Horler	My Year Without Sex	Natalie
**2009** (51st)	Sophie Lowe	Beautiful Kate	Kate

==== 2010s ====
Year	Actress	Film	Role
**2010** (52nd)	**Jacki Weaver**	**Animal Kingdom**	**Janine "Smurf" Cody**
**2010** (52nd)	Abbie Cornish	Bright Star	Fanny Brawne
**2010** (52nd)	Morgana Davies	The Tree	Simone
**2010** (52nd)	Charlotte Gainsbourg	The Tree	Dawn

=== AACTA Awards ===
==== 2010s ====
Year	Actress	Film	Role
**2011** (1st)	**Judy Davis**	**The Eye of the Storm**	**Dorothy de Lascabanes**
**2011** (1st)	Frances O'Connor	The Hunter	Lucy Armstrong
**2011** (1st)	Charlotte Rampling	The Eye of the Storm	Elizabeth Hunter
**2011** (1st)	Emily Watson	Oranges and Sunshine	Margaret Humphreys
**2012** (2nd)	**Deborah Mailman**	**The Sapphires**	**Gail McCrae**
**2012** (2nd)	Toni Collette	Mental	Shaz
**2012** (2nd)	Felicity Price	Wish You Were Here	Alice Flannery
**2012** (2nd)	Sarah Snook	Not Suitable for Children	Stevie
**2013** (3rd)	**Rose Byrne**	**The Turning**	**Raelene**
**2013** (3rd)	Carey Mulligan	The Great Gatsby	Daisy Buchanan
**2013** (3rd)	Tasma Walton	Mystery Road	Mary Swan
**2013** (3rd)	Naomi Watts	Adoration	Lil
**2014** (4th)	**Sarah Snook**	**Predestination**	**The unmarried mother**
**2014** (4th)	Kate Box	The Little Death	Rowena
**2014** (4th)	Essie Davis	The Babadook	Amelia
**2014** (4th)	Mia Wasikowska	Tracks	Robyn Davidson
**2015** (5th)	**Kate Winslet**	**The Dressmaker**	**Myrtle 'Tilly' Dunnage**
**2015** (5th)	Robyn Butler	Now Add Honey	Caroline Morgan
**2015** (5th)	Ningali Lawford-Wolf	Last Cab to Darwin	Polly
**2015** (5th)	Charlize Theron	Mad Max: Fury Road	Imperator Furiosa
**2016** (6th)	**Odessa Young**	**The Daughter**	**Hedvig**
**2016** (6th)	Maeve Dermody	Pawno	Kate
**2016** (6th)	Maggie Naouri	Joe Cinque's Consolation	Anu Singh
**2016** (6th)	Teresa Palmer	Hacksaw Ridge	Dorothy Schutte
**2017** (7th)	**Emma Booth**	**Hounds of Love**	**Evelyn White**
**2017** (7th)	Teresa Palmer	Berlin Syndrome	Clare
**2017** (7th)	Helana Sawires	Ali's Wedding	Dianne
**2017** (7th)	Sara West	Don't Tell	Lyndal
**2018** (8th)	**Angourie Rice**	**Ladies in Black**	**Lisa**
**2018** (8th)	Abbey Lee	1%	Katrina
**2018** (8th)	Rooney Mara	Mary Magdalene	Mary Magdalene
**2018** (8th)	Kate Mulvany	The Merger	Angie Barlow
**2018** (8th)	Julia Ormond	Ladies in Black	Magda
**2019** (9th)	**Aisling Franciosi**	**The Nightingale**	**Clare Carroll**
**2019** (9th)	Nazanin Boniadi	Hotel Mumbai	Zahra
**2019** (9th)	Teresa Palmer	Ride Like a Girl	Michelle Payne
**2019** (9th)	Miranda Tapsell	Top End Wedding	Lauren
**2019** (9th)	Mia Wasikowska	Judy and Punch	Judy

==== 2020s ====
Year	Actress	Film	Role
**2020** (10th)	**Eliza Scanlen**	**Babyteeth**	**Milla Finlay**
**2020** (10th)	Tilda Cobham-Hervey	I Am Woman	Helen Reddy
**2020** (10th)	Laura Gordon	Undertow	Claire
**2020** (10th)	Elisabeth Moss	The Invisible Man	Cecilia Kass
**2020** (10th)	Lupita Nyong'o	Little Monsters	Miss Audrey Caroline
**2021** (11th)	**Judy Davis**	**Nitram**	**Nitram's mother**
**2021** (11th)	Rose Byrne	Peter Rabbit 2: The Runaway	Bea McGregor
**2021** (11th)	Noni Hazlehurst	June Again	June
**2021** (11th)	Genevieve O'Reilly	The Dry	Gretchen
**2021** (11th)	Naomi Watts	Penguin Bloom	Sam Bloom
**2022** (12th)	**Leah Purcell**	**The Drover's Wife**	**Molly Johnson**
**2022** (12th)	Jackie van Beek	Nude Tuesday	Laura
**2022** (12th)	Aisha Dee	Sissy	Cecilia/Sissy
**2022** (12th)	Julia Savage	Blaze	Blaze
**2022** (12th)	Tilda Swinton	Three Thousand Years of Longing	Alithea
**2023** (13th)	**Sophie Wilde**	**Talk to Me**	**Mia**
**2023** (13th)	Shantae Barnes-Cowan	Sweet As	Murra
**2023** (13th)	Cate Blanchett	The New Boy	Sister Eileen
**2023** (13th)	Zar Amir Ebrahimi	Shayda	Shayda
**2023** (13th)	Julia Garner	The Royal Hotel	Hanna
**2023** (13th)	Sarah Snook	Run Rabbit Run	Sarah
**2024** (14th)	**Sarah Snook**	**Memoir of a Snail**	**Grace Pudel**
**2024** (14th)	Laura Gordon	Late Night with the Devil	Dr. June Ross-Mitchell
**2024** (14th)	Jackie van Beek	Audrey	Ronnie Lipsick
**2024** (14th)	Anya Taylor-Joy	Furiosa: A Mad Max Saga	Furiosa
**2024** (14th)	Anna Torv	Force of Nature: The Dry 2	Alice Russell
**2024** (14th)	Phoebe Tonkin	Kid Snow	Sunny
**2025** (15th)	**Sally Hawkins**	**Bring Her Back**	**Laura**
**2025** (15th)	Alison Brie	Together	Millie Wilson
**2025** (15th)	Emily Browning	One More Shot	Minnie Vernon
**2025** (15th)	Susie Porter	The Travellers	Nikki
**2025** (15th)	Daisy Ridley	We Bury the Dead	Ava Newman
**2025** (15th)	Lily Whiteley	Kangaroo	Charlie

== Notes ==
A: From 1958–2010, the awards were held during the year of the film's release. However, the 1974–1975 awards were held in 1975 for films released in 1974 and 1975, and the first AACTA Awards were held in 2012 for films released in 2011.
