= Julia Savage =

Australian actress (born 2007)

- Born: August 24, 2007 (age 18); Sydney, Australia
- Occupation: Actress
- Notable work: Blaze, The Clearing

Julia de Laune Savage (born 2007) is an Australian-English actress. For her performance in the feature film Blaze she received the 2023 International Art Film Fest Blue Angel Award for Best Female Performance in a Feature Film and was nominated for the AACTA Award for Best Actress in a Leading Role at the 12th AACTA Awards. In 2022 she was nominated for Best Actress in the 2022 Australian Film Critics Association Awards.

In 2019, she appeared in the lead role of the Australian historical fantasy Sweet Tooth - narrated by Cate Blanchett. In 2023, Savage appeared in Class of '07 for Prime and in the role of Amy in the Disney+ Original Australian TV series The Clearing.
