= Alex Tilman =

East Timorese actor

== Diplomatic career ==
In 2023, Alexandre Tilman was appointed Ambassador of the Democratic Republic of Timor-Leste to the Republic of Singapore. Prior to his appointment, he served as Partnership and Development Financing Officer at the United Nations Resident Coordinator's Office in Timor-Leste and held various positions in development and public policy, including roles within the Timor-Leste government.

Tilman was formally sworn in as Ambassador of Timor-Leste to Singapore by President José Ramos-Horta on 12 December 2023.

Alex Tilman
- Born: 1976/4/10; East Timor
- Occupation: Diplomat
- Years active: 2023-Present
- Notable work: Answered by Fire Lonely Planet East Timor Phrasebook
- Partner: Antonieta Chung
- Children: 3

Alex Tilman is an East Timorese actor. For his performance in Answered by Fire he was nominated for the 2007 Logie Award for Logie Award for Most Outstanding Newcomer. Tilman lived through some of the events depicted in that film, his father was a Fretilin resistance member who disappeared after being arrested in 1978. He later worked as an interpreter in the Serious Crimes Unit in Timor, including working with Australian police officer David Savage who was the inspiration for David Whenam's character in the film. Like many of the Timorese actors in the film Tilman had no prior acting experience.
