= Suburban Mayhem =

2006 film by Paul Goldman

- Theatrical release poster
- Directed by: Paul Goldman
- Written by: Alice Bell
- Produced by: Jan Chapman; Leah Churchill-Brown
- Starring: Emily Barclay; Michael Dorman; Anthony Hayes; Steve Bastoni; Mia Wasikowska; Genevieve Lemon
- Cinematography: Robert Humphreys
- Edited by: Stephen Evans
- Music by: Mick Harvey
- Distributed by: Icon Film Distribution (Australia)
- Release dates: 24 May 2006 (Cannes); 26 October 2006 (Australia)
- Running time: 95 minutes
- Country: Australia
- Language: English
- Budget: $4 million
- Box office: $184,902

Suburban Mayhem is a 2006 Australian comedy thriller film directed by Paul Goldman and written by Alice Bell. Starring Emily Barclay, Michael Dorman, Anthony Hayes, Robert Morgan, Steve Bastoni, Mia Wasikowska and Genevieve Lemon, the film follows Katrina Skinner (Barclay), a 19-year-old single mother with a long history of petty crimes who plots to murder her father John (Morgan) after he threatens to take custody of her child away from her due to her wild lifestyle and negligent behaviour.

Suburban Mayhem premiered at Cannes Film Festival on 24 May 2006, where it was nominated for the Un Certain Regard. The film was theatrically released in Australia on 26 October 2006, to negative reviews from critics and was a box office failure, grossing $184,902 against its $4 million production budget. Despite this, it received a leading 12 nominations at the 2006 Australian Film Institute Awards, including Best Direction for Goldman, Best Original Screenplay for Bell, and Best Supporting Actress for Lemon, and won three, for Best Actress for Barclay, Best Supporting Actor for Hayes, and Best Original Music Score for Mick Harvey.

== Plot ==
Katrina is a 19-year-old single mother with sinister plans. She navigates a world rife with petty crime, fast cars, manicures, and casual relationships. A skilled manipulator of men, Katrina resides with her lethargic father in the suburban area of Golden Grove, Sydney. Determined to get her way, Katrina will even resort to murder. When her father contemplates reaching out to Social Services to take custody of her child, she devises a plan that will not only cause chaos in the suburb but also catapult her to a level of infamy beyond her wildest expectations.

The story is loosely inspired by the heinous crimes committed by Mark Valera, who was responsible for the deaths of Frank Arkell and David O'Hearn. Additionally, it draws parallels with his sister, Belinda van Krevel, and her then-partner Keith Schreiber, who were involved in the murder of Jack van Krevel.

== Cast ==
- Emily Barclay as Katrina
- Michael Dorman as Rusty
- Anthony Hayes as Kenny
- Robert Morgan as John
- Genevieve Lemon as Dianne
- Laurence Breuls as Danny
- Steve Bastoni as Detective Robert Andretti
- Mia Wasikowska as Lilya
- Susan Prior as Christine Andretti

== Festivals ==
- 2006 – France – Cannes Film Festival
- 2006 – Australia – Melbourne International Film Festival
- 2006 – Canada – Toronto International Film Festival

== Awards ==
Won:

- 2006 Australian Writers Guild: Best Original Feature Film (Alice Bell).
- 2006 Inside Film Awards: Best Actress (Emily Barclay), Best Music, Best Editing.
- 2006 Australian Film Institute Awards: Best Original Music Score (Mick Harvey)
- 2006 Australian Film Institute Awards: Best Lead Actress (Emily Barclay)
- 2006 Australian Film Institute Awards: Best Supporting Actor (Anthony Hayes)

Nominated:

- 2006 Australian Film Institute Awards: Best Direction (Paul Goldman), Best Supporting Actress (Genevieve Lemon), AFI Young Actor Award (Mia Wasikowska), Best Original Screenplay (Alice Bell), Best Editing, Best Production Design, Best Costume Design, Best Sound.
- 2006 Inside Film Awards: Best Feature Film, Best Director, Best Script.

== Reception ==
=== Box office ===
Suburban Mayhem grossed $342,600 at the box office in Australia.

=== Critical reception ===
Suburban Mayhem has received mixed reviews from critics. On Rotten Tomatoes, the film has a "rotten" rating of 20%, based on 5 reviews, with an average rating of 4/10. Film scholar Bruno Starrs has critiqued the film with regard to Barbara Creed's notion of the "maternal feminine" monster.

== See also ==
- Cinema of Australia
