= Blaze (2022 film) =

2022 film

- Promotional poster
- Directed by: Del Kathryn Barton
- Written by: Huna Amweero; Del Kathryn Barton
- Produced by: Samantha Jennings
- Starring: Julia Savage; Simon Baker; Yael Stone; Josh Lawson
- Cinematography: Jeremy Rouse
- Edited by: Dany Cooper
- Music by: Angel Olsen; Sam Petty
- Production company: Causeway Films
- Distributed by: Bonsai Films
- Release date: 2022
- Running time: 101 minutes
- Country: Australia
- Language: English

Blaze is a 2022 Australian drama film co-written and directed by Del Kathryn Barton and produced by Causeway Films. The film premiered in New York in the International Narrative Competition at the 2022 Tribeca Festival and was released in a limited theatrical release in Australia on August 27, 2022 and in the US in January 2023. The film received critical acclaim, with praise for the performance of its 13-year-old lead Julia Savage.

== Premise ==
Twelve-year-old Blaze is the sole witness to the violent assault and rape of a young woman, Hannah, who subsequently dies. Police need her evidence for a conviction, but she is severely traumatized.

== Plot ==
Blaze is a 12-year-old girl living in a Paddington terrace house, the only home she has ever known. Her bedroom is in the roof space, sparsely decorated apart from a display cabinet, which contains a collection of cute china animals, in pairs. It is likely they were collected by her mother, whose absence is unexplained. Another ornament is a small white china dragon. She has an imaginary friend, a glitzy ceiling-high dragon with multiple breasts, a long snout and teeth like a crocodile's, glistening eyes the size of bowling balls, and long black lashes. She calls her Zephy. Luke, her father, might be an architect, but is a solitary man. We see no friends or colleagues and his mother is his only confidante. He is diligent but uncomfortable in his role as a father and defensive in conversation with women.

=== The crime ===
Blaze is returning from a visit to the shops via a service lane, some short distance behind Hannah and Jake, who are unaware of her presence. They were once lovers, and Jake wants to revisit that relationship but she refuses; embarrassed, Blaze hides but can still observe. Jake is insistent, then violently throws Hannah to the bitumen. She attempts to escape over a fence but he forces her against an old tree and rapes her. She falls to the ground and he leaves her there. Blaze drops her ice-cream and runs home, sobbing under the blanket. Luke asks after the cause of her distress but she is mute. The sound of sirens is heard in the distance.

Blaze and her father are at the police station, her phone had been found at the crime scene, so she is implicated as a possible witness; she is fingerprinted and a DNA swab taken. She is forensically examined by a woman doctor.

=== Follow-up ===
Two weeks later she is interviewed by Jade, an unsympathetic police psychologist, then at the committal hearing she identifies Jake as the rapist, but his counsel asks intimidating questions — implying that due to her age and naivety she can't distinguish rape from role-playing, and if she was concerned, why did she not scream for help? And have you ever told a lie? Blaze's response is filmically represented by flames from her china dragon (shown in closeup on the film's advertising material) directed at the accused and his counsel, Simmons. Luke is later informed that as an unreliable witness, Blaze's testimony has been discounted. Jake has admitted to consensual sex with Hannah, any assault must have been later, by someone else. Blaze finds Hannah's surname, Blum, from the internet, and discovers websites devoted to female attack victims. She finds Hannah's social media page, and is drawn into her life story. She adorns her wall with pictures of Hannah. The relationship between Blaze and her father is tense. He drops her off at her regular judo class (Note: Clearly identified as Team Perosh, a real-life Mixed Martial Arts training business in Sydney.) — but she doesn't want to be picked up: she will return by bus. At the dojo, Blaze and her friend Anna, who attends the same school but is a year or two older, discuss sex and virginity. On the trip home she recognises Jake through the window and calls for the driver to stop. She screams and repeatedly pounds the window with her forehead, drawing blood. Blaze is sedated and admitted to a psychiatric clinic. She is released in the care of her father, and prescribed medication to be administered with meals. She worries that under medication she will lose Zephy.

=== Crisis ===
Weeks go by with no noticeable improvement, then she starts hiding the capsules in a figurine. The drugs wear off, and her torpidity turns to manic activity — hanging the figures by woollen threads, attached to the ceiling by wax which she melts with a gas lighter. Luke is furious — she could have set fire to their home. She is chastened but no longer catatonic. She returns to her judo class and, egged on by her father, competes bravely. When he sobs with relief she is embarrassed. Blaze and Anna discover Jake's home address, and after school a day or so later, confront him, saying "I know what I saw". His companion, perhaps his wife, is mystified; he shrugs but Blaze stares him down. When she returns home, the photos, her laptop and china figures are gone; Luke has found the hidden capsules. She is unrepentant. Next morning she goes down to the garage, starts the car, and with a squeal of tyres backs across the road, narrowly missing her father and causing minor damage. She is re-admitted to the psychology ward. A fellow patient is a boy who has been diagnosed with a bipolar disorder; she is comforted by sleeping alongside him. Next day she meets a counsellor, a young woman with prominent tattoos and only one functioning eye; Blaze lets down her guard. The counsellor candidly answers Blaze's concerns. That night she experiences he first menstrual period.

=== Resolution ===
In the closing scenes of the film she is aged 13, and looking more confident. The criminal trial is about to be opened, and she has the option of giving evidence. She befriends an older boy from school; exchanging confidences, he advises her to testify and she passes to him her white china dragon. Returning home, she announces to her father her decision to take the stand.

== Cast ==
- Julia Savage as Blaze
- Simon Baker as Luke
- Yael Stone as Hannah
- Josh Lawson as Jake
- Heather Mitchell as Jackie Stevens

== Reception ==
The film review website Metacritic lists 5 critics and assessed 5 reviews as positive. It give a weighted average score of 85 out of 100, which it said indicated "Universal acclaim". Rotten Tomatoes lists 17 critics with 15 assessed as fresh and two as rotten. It gave the film a score of 88%.

Peter Debruge of Variety writes "'Blaze' marks the feature directing debut of a distinctive new voice, and though there's a certain woodenness to the narrative, the visuals—glitter dreams of a 10-foot fuchsia dragon—radiate with originality." Luke Buckmaster of The Guardian gave it 4 stars, writing "The result is a hot, sticky, trippy fusion of wild style and painfully genuine emotion, with plenty of moments that take your breath away." The Sydney Morning Herald's Sandra Hall gives it a 3 1/2 star review concluding "It's a bold piece of filmmaking. Barton has tried to take us inside the mind of a traumatised sub-teen by way of charting her changing relationship with a fantasy that has kept her company since childhood. She has used the aesthetic sensibility that shapes her painting to bring this about, but it's only the power and the subtlety of Savage's performance that saves the narrative from being swamped by the intricacies of the production design."

== Awards ==
- Art Film Fest 2023
  - Blue Angel Award for Best Performance by a Female Actress - Julia Savage
- 12th AACTA Awards
  - Best Lead Actress - Julia Savage - nominated
  - Best Supporting Actress - Yael Stone - nominated
  - Best Supporting Actor - Simon Baker - nominated
  - Best Editing - Dany Cooper - nominated
  - Best Cinematography - Jeremy Rouse - nominated
- 55th AWGIE Awards
  - Original – Feature Film – Del Kathryn Barton and Huna Amweero
