= Cargo (2017 film) =

Australian thriller film

- Theatrical release poster
- Directed by: Ben Howling; Yolanda Ramke
- Screenplay by: Yolanda Ramke
- Based on: Cargo by: Ben Howling; Yolanda Ramke
- Produced by: Russell Ackerman; Kristina Ceyton; Samantha Jennings; Mark Patterson
- Starring: Martin Freeman; Simone Landers; Anthony Hayes; David Gulpilil; Susie Porter; Natasha Wanganeen; Caren Pistorius
- Cinematography: Geoffrey Simpson
- Edited by: Dany Cooper; Sean Lahiff
- Production companies: Umbrella Entertainment; Addictive Pictures; Causeway Films; Head Gear Films
- Distributed by: Netflix
- Release dates: 6 October 2017 (ADLFF); 18 May 2018 (Worldwide)
- Running time: 105 minutes
- Country: Australia
- Language: English

Cargo is a 2017 Australian post-apocalyptic thriller film directed by Ben Howling and Yolanda Ramke with a screenplay by Ramke based on their 2013 short film of the same name. The film stars Martin Freeman, Simone Landers, Anthony Hayes, David Gulpilil, Susie Porter, and Caren Pistorius. It follows a couple and their baby travelling in remote Australia amid a deadly disease outbreak. It premiered at the Adelaide Film Festival on 6 October 2017 and was released in cinemas in Australia on 17 May 2018, worldwide except for Australia on 18 May 2018 by Netflix and on Netflix in Australia on 16 November 2018.

== Plot ==
In a world recently overtaken by a virus that turns people rabid within 48 hours, Andy Rose, his wife Kay, and their baby Rosie are traveling down a river on a houseboat in rural Australia. Short on food, Kay suggests going ashore and scavenging, but Andy rejects this, arguing it would be safer to remain on the river until they reach their destination, a supposed refuge. The next day, Andy searches an abandoned sailboat and retrieves some supplies, but when Kay ventures out to collect more, she is bitten by a rabid human.

Andy finds Kay trying to bandage the bite wound and insists on taking her to a hospital since she would bleed out long before succumbing to the virus. The Rose family disembarks, restarts an abandoned car, and sets out toward what their map indicates is a large town, but they swerve to avoid an Aboriginal man wearing a mouth gag standing in the road and crash. Kay is impaled and Andy faints. By the time he wakes, Kay has already turned and bites him while he attempts to remove Rosie from the car. After Andy succeeds in carrying Rosie out of the car, he returns to give Kay a lethal injection from a government emergency medical kit. In grief, Andy, with Rosie carried on his back, seeks out the man, who is also turned, and moves to confront him but a girl named Thoomi appears and reveals that the man is her father, Willie Bell. Thoomi has been hiding Willie from her mother, Josie, and the rest of her community because the Aboriginals are systematically burning the infected. She believes her father can be cured by having a shaman restore his soul.

Andy reaches the town, but it is much smaller than expected and deserted apart from Etta, a schoolteacher who takes care of him and Rosie for the night. Etta explains that all of her students and their families, most of them Aboriginals, have discarded modern trappings and gone back to the old ways; she warns Andy to hide his bite mark. Andy wakes later than planned the next morning after experiencing his first seizure from the virus. When Andy and Rosie leave, Etta shows them a picture of Thoomi and her parents and tells Andy to find them and leave Rosie in their care.

Andy assists a man named Vic, owner of a fortified shelter, and meets Vic's apparent wife, Lorraine. Andy learns that Vic uses healthy humans in cages as bait, one of whom is Thoomi, to lure out the infected so he can shoot them. That night, Andy attempts suicide, believing Rosie will be cared for by Vic and Lorraine, but Lorraine stops him and reveals that she is not Vic's wife, but his captive, and Vic murdered her real husband. Vic discovers them and knocks Andy out, and he awakens in the same cage as Thoomi. They help each other escape by using the combined strength of many infected to pull open their cage. As they escape the shelter with Lorraine and Rosie in tow, an enraged Vic shoots at them, inadvertently killing Lorraine.

The following morning, Andy upsets Thoomi when he tells her that he and her father will not get better. She runs to where she had been hiding her father, but finds her people had already discovered Willie and put him down. Initially distraught and blaming Andy for delaying her, Thoomi relents and rejoins him when she hears Rosie crying. They travel by motorboat to a campsite where Andy previously saw another family, but learn that the father has been bitten and plans to kill his family and himself with a revolver. The father tells Andy to use the gun's last two cartridges

As the trio passes through a railway tunnel, they re-encounter Vic. Thoomi hides with Rosie while Andy and Vic fight. Vic manages to grab the revolver during the struggle and shoots Andy, then goes after Thoomi and Rosie. When Andy recovers, he finds Vic cradling Rosie and weeping over the loss of Lorraine. Vic peacefully returns Rosie to Andy and allows them and Thoomi to leave.

Later, Andy enters the final throes of infection. With his time almost gone, Andy asks Thoomi to look after Rosie. He and Thoomi prepare for his turning by binding his hands and preparing a piece of meat on a stick, which Thoomi uses to bait him once he has turned. In this manner, Thoomi uses Andy to carry her and Rosie safely on his back. They eventually catch up to a party of Aboriginal warriors and Thoomi is reunited with Josie. She also pulls Rosie off Andy as one of the warriors gets ready to kill Andy. Before that however, Thoomi uses Kay's perfume to bring Andy back to his senses just long enough to see that Rosie is safe. The warrior then puts Andy out of his misery. The group returns to a large community of survivors deep in the wilderness protected by high mountain walls. The survivors are overjoyed at Thoomi's safe return and happily welcome Rosie. As Thoomi and Josie check Rosie for injuries, they find Andy had painted the words "Thank You" on her stomach. It is implied that Josie will raise Rosie alongside Thoomi as her own in gratitude to Andy for saving Thoomi. A tree in the community is decorated with items that belonged to Thoomi and Andy.

== Cast ==
- Martin Freeman as Andy Rose
- Simone Landers as Thoomi Bell
- Anthony Hayes as Vic Carter
- Susie Porter as Kay Caine
- Caren Pistorius as Lorraine Cassidy
- David Gulpilil as Daku, the Clever Man
- Kris McQuade as Etta
- Bruce R. Carter as Willie Bell
- Natasha Wanganeen as Josie Bell

== Release ==
The film was originally scheduled to be released on 8 June 2018. However, it was later brought forward to 18 May 2018. The film is dedicated in memory of Geoffrey Gurrumul Yunupingu, an Aboriginal Australian singer who died aged 46 on 26 July 2017.

== Reception ==
Cargo received positive reviews from critics, praising its emotional depth and Freeman's performance. On review aggregator website Rotten Tomatoes, the film holds an approval rating of 87%, based on 77 reviews, and an average rating of 7.10/10. The website's critical consensus reads, "Cargo takes a refreshingly character-driven approach to the zombie genre that's further distinguished by its Australian setting and Martin Freeman's terrific lead performance." On Metacritic, the film has a weighted average score of 65 out of 100, based on 12 critics, indicating "generally favorable reviews".

The film has been described as a tribute to the 2009 film The Road. In a positive review, Brian Tallerico of RogerEbert.com stated he believed George A. Romero would have enjoyed the film. Clark Collins of Entertainment Weekly gave the film a 'B', saying: "The Australian setting brings a fresh, and epic, quality to this now done-to-death genre". However, Frank Scheck of The Hollywood Reporter criticised the film for being "unlikely to satisfy either viewers looking for serious-minded fare or horror fans looking for genuine frights", but praised Freeman's "quietly intense" performance.

=== Accolades ===
Award	Category	Subject	Result
AACTA Awards (8th)	Best Film	Russell Ackerman, Kristina Ceyton, Samantha Jennings, and Mark Patterson	Nominated
AACTA Awards (8th)	Best Adapted Screenplay	Yolanda Ramke	Nominated
AACTA Awards (8th)	Best Sound	Liam Egan, Leah Katz, Des Kenneally, and Robert Sullivan	Nominated
AACTA Awards (8th)	Best Production Design	Jo Ford	Nominated
AACTA Awards (8th)	Best Hair and Makeup	Larry Van Duynhoven, Beverley Freeman & Helen Magelaki	Nominated
Fangoria Chainsaw Awards	Best First Feature	Ben Howling and Yolanda Ramke	Nominated
Fangoria Chainsaw Awards	Best Supporting Actress	Simone Landers	Nominated
