= Cargo (2013 film) =

- Directed by: Ben Howling; Yolanda Ramke
- Written by: Yolanda Ramke
- Produced by: Daniel Foeldes; Ben Howling; Marcus Newman; Yolanda Ramke
- Starring: Andy Rodoreda; Ruth Venn; Yolanda Ramke; Alison Gallagher; Kallan Richards; Effron Heather; Scott Wood
- Cinematography: Daniel Foeldes
- Edited by: Shannon Longville
- Music by: Helen Grimley
- Production company: Dreaming Tree Productions
- Release date: 17 February 2013 (Tropfest)
- Running time: 7 minutes
- Country: Australia
- Language: English

Cargo is a 2013 Australian short film directed by Ben Howling and Yolanda Ramke, written by Ramke, and starring Andy Rodoreda as a father who must protect his young daughter (Ruth Venn) during a zombie apocalypse. It was made for the Tropfest short film festival, where it was a finalist. It went viral after it was uploaded to YouTube, and it was featured on many web sites. By 2018, it had been viewed over 14 million times.

== Plot ==
After a car crash knocks him unconscious, a man wakes up to find that his wife has died and turned into a zombie. He leaves the car, grabs his young daughter from the back seat, and realizes that his wife bit him while he was unconscious. After an emotional goodbye to his wife, he sets off to find survivors.

Knowing that he does not have much time left before he turns into a zombie, he puts his daughter in a baby back-pack, binds his hands to a pole, and attaches carrion to the end of the pole. After he collapses, he rises again as a zombie, and, drawn by the lure of the carrion on the pole, continues his journey.

After a point, he notices the balloon he inflated for his daughter and is distracted by it. He is then shot by a sniper, and three survivors investigate his corpse to make sure he’s dead. They almost leave before the woman of the group hears the baby’s cries and discovers everything he did to try to save his daughter, who has 'My Name is Rosie' written on her stomach in permanent marker.

In the ending scene, the woman holds and comforts Rosie while in the background, the two men bury her father under a cross, giving him honor for his sacrifice and dedication to Rosie.

== Cast ==
- Andy Rodoreda as Father
- Ruth Venn as Rosie, the father's baby daughter
- Yolanda Ramke as Survivor
- Alison Gallagher as Mother
- Kallan Richards as Survivor
- Effron Heather as Survivor
- Scott Wood as Sniper

== Release ==
Cargo was made for the Tropfest short film festival, where it was a finalist. After its release, it went viral and attracted millions of views on YouTube.

== Reception ==
Cargo was featured on Die Zeit, The Week, CNET, IGN, Film School Rejects, and Bloody Disgusting.

== Remake ==
Cargo was remade as a 2017 feature length film starring Martin Freeman. The feature film was made available on Netflix in April 2018.
