= Gold (2022 Australian film) =

Thriller film directed by Anthony Hayes

- Theatrical release poster
- Directed by: Anthony Hayes
- Written by: Anthony Hayes; Polly Smyth
- Produced by: Anthony Hayes; John Schwarz; Michael Schwarz
- Starring: Zac Efron; Susie Porter; Anthony Hayes
- Cinematography: Ross Giardina
- Edited by: Sean Lahiff
- Music by: Antony Partos
- Production companies: Deeper Water Films; Rogue Star Pictures; South Australian Film Corporation; Screen Australia; Stan; Ingenious Media; Altitude Film Distribution
- Distributed by: Madman Entertainment
- Release date: 13 January 2022
- Running time: 97 minutes
- Country: Australia
- Language: English
- Budget: $6.5 million
- Box office: $229,689

Gold is a 2022 Australian survival thriller film directed by Anthony Hayes. It stars Zac Efron, Susie Porter, and Anthony Hayes. The film was internationally released on 13 January 2022, before making its debut on streaming service Stan on 26 January 2022.

== Plot ==
In a dystopian near-future, a lone traveller named Virgil arrives at an outpost and pays local man Keith to transport him to an area known as The Compound.

Travelling through an inhospitable desert, the two eventually discover an enormous gold nugget in a remote area after Virgil overheats the car by turning on the air conditioning.

After failing to extract it with their basic tools and truck, Keith suggests staying with the gold while Virgil leaves to try to find an excavator, suggesting he does not have what it takes to survive alone. Virgil argues that he should be the one to stay with the gold instead as he found it. Keith leaves Virgil with his remaining supplies and an estimated return in five days.

As time goes on Virgil begins to deteriorate both physically and mentally as paranoia sets in. In his searches for firewood to keep wild dogs away, he comes across a crashed plane.

Virgil makes himself a shelter next to the gold from pieces he scavenges from the plane. During that time he encounters a scorpion which he lets be, and a snake, which in his attempts to kill with his pocket knife, he accidentally knocks over a day's worth of water.

After several days awaiting Keith's return, a lone woman comes across Virgil as he is scavenging more from the plane. The woman is immediately suspicious of Virgil and his reasoning for being alone in the desert, also announcing her knowledge of his camp by the tree. She makes her way over to investigate and Virgil follows.

Stating her hatred of people who are fleeing the cities for the resources of her land, and accusing Virgil of hiding something, he kills her with his shovel and buries her body. Her shallow grave is later dug up by a wild dog, Virgil drags her away from camp and burns her body in the night.

A day later a sandstorm destroys the camp and tree, leaving Virgil wounded from a branch through the stomach and without any supplies.

Virgil's health further deteriorates from removing the tree branch and additional sun exposure. Waking up after a period of unconsciousness to another female scavenger pointing a crossbow at him, before falling unconscious again and having strange visions of the scorpion and scavenger.

He awakes to the scavenger offering to help him to a watering hole and offering food. Virgil shouts for her to leave. The woman asks about him knowing her sister and disappears.

Virgil makes contact with Keith via radio, who informs Virgil he is close by. However, Virgil, now critically injured, is attacked and killed by a pack of wild dogs.

Keith is revealed to be watching nearby, waiting with the excavation equipment. As he moves in to extract the gold, Keith is shot in the chest with an arrow.

== Cast ==
- Zac Efron as Virgil (credited as "man one")
- Anthony Hayes as Keith (credited as "man two")
- Susie Porter as the Stranger and the Stranger's sister
- Andreas Sobik as an outpost attendant
- Hayden Fein as man three

== Production ==
In November 2020 it was announced that Zac Efron had signed on to the film, to be directed by Anthony Hayes, who would also play one of the major roles. The screenplay was co-written by Hayes and Polly Smyth, while the film was produced by Hayes along with John Schwartz and Michael Schwarz. It was later announced that Susie Porter had joined the cast, with the film set to play on Stan in Australia as a Stan Original with Stan backing the film, after Madman Entertainment had theatrically distributed it in Australia. Altitude Film Entertainment were responsible for international sales.

Principal photography began in November 2020 in outback South Australia, in the Flinders Ranges and the town of Leigh Creek. The film includes a desert sandstorm scene, for which fans and sand were transported to the desert location. However a real sandstorm began in the region and the actors agreed to shoot in it instead. Efron broke a bone in his hand halfway through the shoot, but concealed it from the crew to avoid stalling production.

== Release ==
In June 2021, Screen Media Films acquired U.S. distribution rights to the film in a bidding war. In June 2021, Altitude Films announced it had sold the film to all but two territories around the world. It was internationally released on 13 January 2022, before making its debut on streaming service Stan on 26 January 2022. On 11 March 2022 it had a limited theatrical release and was released on VOD.

== Reception ==
=== Box office ===
Gold grossed $100,197 in the United States and Canada, and a worldwide total of $229,689. In Australia, the film grossed $2,741 from ten theatres in its opening weekend.

=== Critical response ===
On the review aggregator website Rotten Tomatoes, 65% of 51 critics' reviews are positive, with an average rating of 6.1/10. The website's consensus reads: "Zac Efron makes Gold worth watching, even if the film as a whole struggles to match its leading man's committed central performance." Metacritic, which uses a weighted average, assigned the film a score of 48 out of 100, based on 12 critics, indicating "mixed or average" reviews. A 3 out of 5 star review in The Guardian praised the cinematography and Efron's performance, but found the plot sparse.
