= The Travellers (2025 film) =

Australian film by Bruce Beresford

- Theatrical release poster
- Directed by: Bruce Beresford
- Written by: Bruce Beresford
- Produced by: Michael Boughen; Matthew Street; Kelvin Munro
- Starring: Luke Bracey; Bryan Brown; Susie Porter; Shubshri Kandiah; Celia Massingham; Nicholas Hammond
- Cinematography: Peter James
- Edited by: Mark Warner
- Music by: George Ellis
- Production company: Ambience Entertainment
- Distributed by: Sony Pictures Releasing International
- Release date: 9 October 2025
- Running time: 97 minutes
- Country: Australia
- Language: English

The Travellers is a 2025 Australian drama film written and directed by Bruce Beresford.

== Plot ==
The Travellers follows Stephen Seary, a successful stage designer, who returns to his small hometown in Australia to say goodbye to his dying mother. What was to be a quick trip descends into chaos, drama, and at times funny moments as Stephen navigates family responsibilities, a difficult relationship with his father, old friends & past lovers, all while trying to return to Europe for a major opera contract.

== Cast ==
- Luke Bracey as Stephen
- Bryan Brown as Fred
- Susie Porter as Nikki
- Shubshri Kandiah as Margie
- Celia Massingham as Jenny
- Nicholas Hammond as Charles Kennelworth
- Alison McGirr as Siobhan
- Saxon Rice-Fazey as Hardware Assistant

== Production ==
The Travellers, an Ambience Entertainment production was shot in August - September 2024 in various locations across Perth, Western Australia and the Avon region capturing the landscapes and untouched nearby country towns.

== Release ==
On 2 July 2025 the first trailer for the film was released and it was announced that the film will open in theatres in Australia on 9 October 2025.

== Critical response ==
Critic Ratings
Publication	Rating
The Guardian	2/5 stars
The Sydney Morning Herald	4/5 stars
Film Ink	7 / 10
X - Press Magazine	6.5 / 10
LSJ	2/5 stars
Spotlight Report	3/5 stars
Jane Freebury	3/5 stars
Greg King	3/5 stars

Film Ink rated the film 14 out of 20, stating that it is "a cozy comedy-drama". The Age said there are "passages of light and shade finely etched in a poignantly funny film". Richard Wilkinson, Nine Entertainment Editor said the film is "a triumph... a timeless story beautifully told" in an interview with Bryan Brown and Bruce Beresford on A Current Affairs. Ruari Elkington from The Conversation also gave the film a positive review stating, those who see the film "will be rewarded with a gently unfurling yarn that delivers on the promise of Beresford's and Brown's brand of prestige Australian drama." He went on to say that "there won't be five other titles much like The Travellers in Australian cinemas this year, or any other year."

The Australian declared the film "an exquisite gift from the legendary Bruce Beresford" rating it 4 out of 5. Nikki Gemmell gave the film a positive review, calling Luke Bracey's performance "a revelation". Sandra Hall of the Sydney Morning Herald praised Bryan Brown's performance stating he was "a joy to watch" and that the film was "poignantly funny." Sandra rated the film 4 out of 5 stars.
