= Vietnam Nurses =

- Promotional poster
- Written by: Polly Watkins
- Directed by: Polly Watkins
- Music by: John Willsteed
- Country of origin: Australia
- Original language: English

Production
- Producers: Lizzette Atkins; Beth Frey
- Cinematography: Michael Williams
- Editor: Tony Stevens
- Running time: 52 minutes

Original release
- Release: 2005

Vietnam Nurses is a 2005 television documentary directed by Polly Watkins. It tells the story of six Australian Army nurses who served in a field hospital in Vietnam between the years 1962 and 1972.

== Interviewees ==
- Diane Badcock
- Anne Healey
- Maggie Hopcraft
- Jan McCarthy
- Terrie Ross
- Colleen Thurgar
- Barry Morgan

== Awards ==
The film won an Australian Film Institute award in 2006 and received a further 3 nominations.
