= The Silence (2006 film) =

2006 television film directed by Cate Shortland

- Directed by: Cate Shortland
- Starring: Richard Roxburgh; Essie Davis; Alice McConnell; Emily Barclay
- Composer: Antony Partos
- Country of origin: Australia
- Original language: English

Production
- Executive producers: Miranda Dear; Scott Meek
- Producers: Anthony Anderson; Jan Chapman; Kerrie Mainwaring
- Cinematography: Robert Humphreys
- Editor: Scott Gray

Original release
- Release: 2 April 2006

The Silence is an Australian television film that first aired on ABC on 2 April 2006.

== Synopsis ==
After being traumatised by a fatal shooting, Detective Richard Treloar is relegated to curating a police photographic exhibition at the Police Museum. He becomes obsessed by images of a murder victim and makes connections between a series of murder mysteries. When one of the leads is killed, the case is reopened and he becomes the prime suspect, as his life begins to unravel.

== Cast ==
- Richard Roxburgh as Richard Treloar
- Essie Davis as Juliet Moore
- Alice McConnell as Helen Wilson
- Emily Barclay as Evelyn Hutchison
- Damian De Montemas as Michael Hanlon
- Tony Barry as Dennis Riordan
- Joel Tobeck as Ross Moss
- Firass Dirani as Anthony Vassalio
- Ella Scott Lynch as Lilya
- Billie Rose Prichard as Surry Hill Girl

== Reception ==
=== Critical reception ===
On review aggregator website Rotten Tomatoes, the film holds an approval rating of 50%, based on 6 reviews, with an average rating of 5/10.

=== Awards ===
The Silence won the Australian Screen Sound Guild Award for Best Achievement in Sound for a Tele-Feature or Mini-Series.

It was nominated for an AFI Award for Best Telefeature or Mini Series, Best Lead Actor in Television Drama for Richard Roxburgh and Best Guest or Supporting Actress in Television Drama for Emily Barclay.

It was also nominated at the 2007 Logie Awards for Silver Logie in Most Outstanding Drama Series, Miniseries or Telemovie. Richard Roxburgh was nominated for Most Outstanding Actor and Emily Barclay was nominated for Most Outstanding New Talent.
