= The Caterpillar Wish =

2006 film

- Directed by: Sandra Sciberras
- Written by: Sandra Sciberras
- Produced by: Kate Whitbread
- Starring: Victoria Thaine; Susie Porter; Philip Quast
- Cinematography: Greig Fraser
- Edited by: Jason Ballantine
- Music by: Burkhard von Dallwitz (as Burkhard Dallwitz)
- Distributed by: Palace Films
- Release date: 15 June 2006
- Running time: 100 minutes
- Country: Australia
- Language: English
- Budget: A$1.4 million
- Box office: A$456,018

The Caterpillar Wish (also known as Caterpillar Wish) is a 2006 Australian coming-of-age film, directed by Sandra Sciberras and produced by Kate Whitbread. The film stars an ensemble cast including Victoria Thaine, Susie Porter, and Philip Quast. It was filmed in and around Robe, South Australia. The Caterpillar Wish was released in Australia on 15 June 2006.

== Plot ==
Emily is a seventeen-year-old schoolgirl who lives with her mother Susan. Emily never knew her father. According to her mother, he was a "tom cat"—a tourist who wandered into town one summer and was never seen again.

Susan is struggling to let go of the past. She hasn't spoken to her religious extremist parents for years after they disowned her for becoming pregnant at fifteen.

Emily actively pursues a friendship with father-figure Stephen, who spends his days fixing boats at the harbour. But Stephen has his own troubles, constantly haunted by the past, unable to keep the loss of his wife and baby daughter from his thoughts.

Stephen's sister Elizabeth is married to the town policeman Carl. Elizabeth suspects Carl is being unfaithful but is scared to uncover the truth. Her son Joel has a secret love of his own.

When a Bible turns up with an intriguing inscription, Emily is the first to realise that hoping for change is not enough.

== Cast ==
| Actor | Role |
|---|---|
| Victoria Thaine | Emily Woodbrige |
| Susie Porter | Susan Woodbrige |
| Philip Quast | Carl Roberts |
| Wendy Hughes | Elizabeth Roberts |
| Khan Chittenden | Joel Roberts |
| Will Traeger | Ewan Roberts |
| Robert Mammone | Stephen Knight |
| Nicholas Bell | Father Caleb |
| Elspeth Ballantyne | Mrs. Woodbridge (Emily's Grandmother) |

== Reception ==
The Sunday Morning Herald said that "there is something enchanting about this unassuming film. You will ignore its flaws and be swept along by Thaine's delicate and touching performance."

== Awards ==
- 2006 Australian Film Institute Awards: Best Actress in a Supporting Role (Susie Porter)

== See also ==
- South Australian Film Corporation
- Robe
