= Alice McConnell =

Australian actress

- Born: ~1977
- Occupation: Actress
- Years active: 2002-2012

Alice McConnell is an Australian actress. For her performance in The Incredible Journey of Mary Bryant she was nominated for the 2005 Australian Film Institute Award for Best Guest or Supporting Actress in a Television Drama.

McConnell played the lead in the 2012 film Being Venice and had a major role in 2006's The Silence. She played Caitlin King in the first two series of MDA. On stage she played a leading role in a Bell Shakespeare production of As You Like It for a three-month tour.
