= Emma Lung =

Australian actress (born 1982)

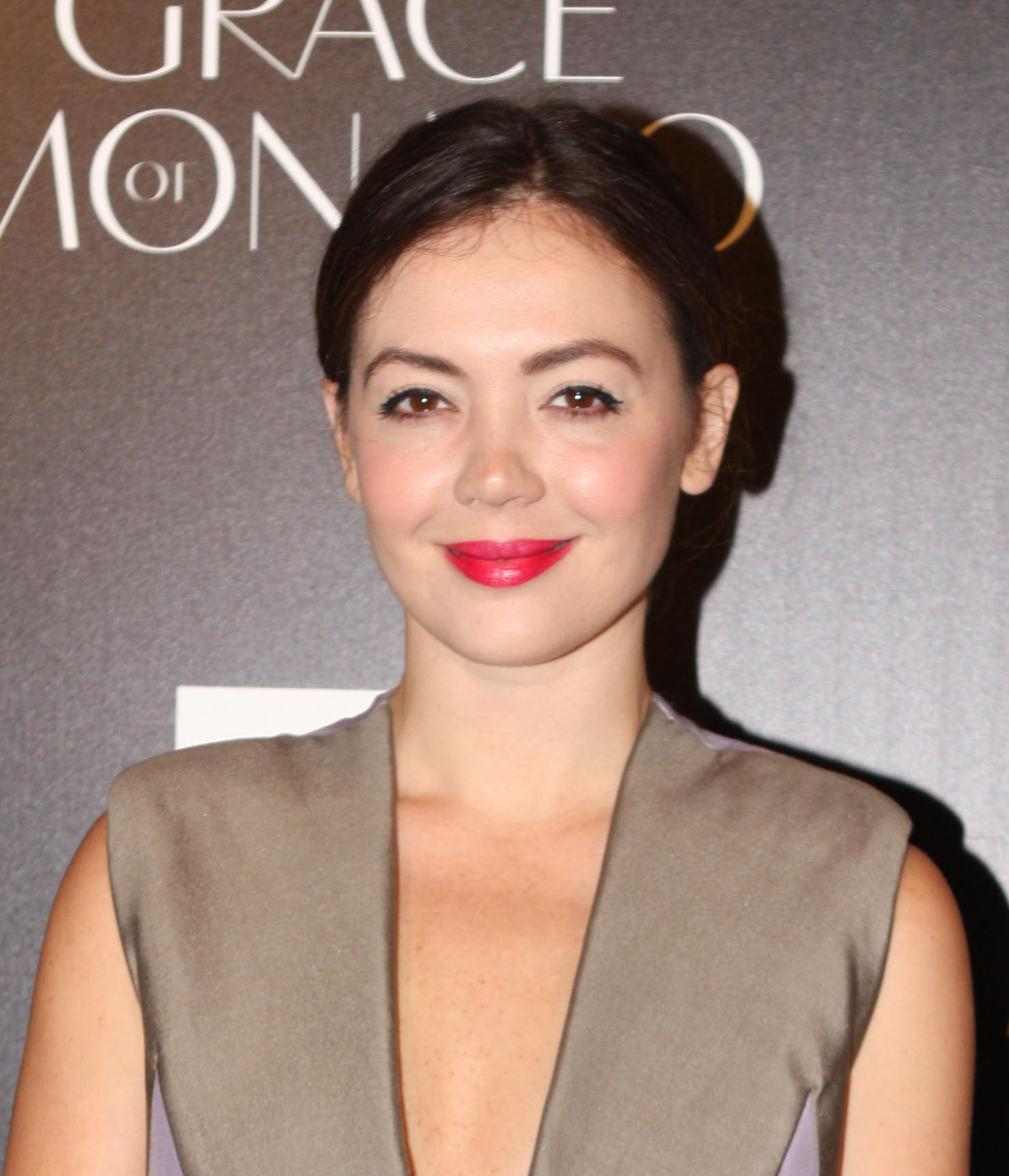
- Lung in 2014
- Born: 14 January 1982 (age 44); Sydney, New South Wales, Australia
- Occupation: Actress
- Years active: 2002–present
- Spouse: Henry Zalapa (m. 2013)
- Children: 2

Emma Lung (born 14 January 1982) is an Australian actress.

== Early life and education ==
Born in Sydney, Lung's father is half-Chinese; his father (Emma's paternal grandfather) was born near Beijing. Lung's mother is Scottish and French.

Growing up in Sydney, Lung attended Newtown High School of the Performing Arts before being accepted into the Professional Performing Arts School in New York City and completed her dramatic studies there.

== Career ==
Lung's first credits include roles in the TV movie Superfire, the feature film Garage Days, and an appearance in the music video for the Shihad song "Comfort Me", all in 2002. In 2003, Lung played Carmelita in the TV film Temptation; she reprised the role in the short-lived spin-off drama series The Cooks which debuted on Network Ten the following year.

Lung received her breakthrough role in the film Peaches starring alongside Jacqueline McKenzie and Hugo Weaving. She starred in the movie 48 Shades alongside Victoria Thaine and Richard Wilson. Further starring roles include Dee McLachlan's film The Jammed in 2007, Christopher Smith's Triangle in 2009 and the 2012 psychological thriller Crave alongside Josh Lawson, Edward Furlong, and Ron Perlman; the film was directed by Charles de Lauzirika. She played Lola, the scheming wife of second son Marou Montebello in ABC TV's 2012 series The Straits. Lung played teacher Colette Riger in the television show Wonderland, which aired on Channel 10 from 2013 to 2015. In 2022 Lung began a recurring role on the Stan streaming series Wolf Like Me. On 8 August, Lung was announced as a returning part of the Strife cast.

== Personal life ==
Lung married Henry Zalapa in 2013. Their first child, son Marlowe James Zalapa was born on 5 April 2015. Their second child, daughter Ophelia Sage Zalapa was born on 14th December 2020.

== Awards ==
Year	Title	Award	Category	Result
2006	Stranded	AFI Awards	Outstanding Achievement in Short Film Screen Craft	Won
2007	Stranded	2007 Logie awards	Graham Kennedy Award For Most Outstanding New Talent	Won
2008	The Jammed	AFI Awards	Best Lead Actress	Nominated

== Filmography ==
=== Film ===
Year	Movie	Role	Type
2002	Garage Days	Freddy's Babysitter	Feature film
2003	The Extreme Team	Kelly	U.S. title: The X-Team
2003	Ned	Cindy	Feature film
2004	Peaches	Steph	Feature film
2005	Stranded	Claudia	Short film
2005	House of Wax	Jennifer (uncredited)	Feature film
2005	Two Minutes to Midnight	Claire	Feature film
2006	Footy Legends	Jasmyne	Feature film
2006	48 Shades	Naomi	Feature film
2007	The Jammed	Crystal	Feature film Nominated for an AFI Award for Best Supporting Actress
2009	Triangle	Heather	Feature film
2009	Crush	Anna	Feature film
2009	The Boys Are Back	Mia	Feature film
2012	Crave	Virginia	Feature film

=== Television ===
Year	Series	Role	Notes
2003	White Collar Blue	Andrea	TV series, season 1, episode 20
2004	All Saints	April Sutton	TV series, season 6, episode 37: "On the Brink"
2003	Temptation	Carmelita	TV movie preceding The Cooks
2004–05	The Cooks	Carmelita	TV series, 13 episodes
2007	Entourage	Heather	TV series, season 4, episode 7: "The Day Fuckers"
2009	Rescue: Special Ops	Chelsea Clarke	TV series, season 1, episode 3: "Fire in the Cross"
2009	My Place	Bridie	TV anthology series, 2 episodes
2012	The Straits	Lola Montebello	TV series, 12 episodes
2013–15	Wonderland	Colette Riger	TV series, 44 episodes
2016	Rake	Carmen	TV series, season 4, episode 8
2022–23	Wolf Like Me	Sarah	TV series, 9 episodes
2023	The Lost Flowers of Alice Hart	Nurse Brooke Jansen	TV series, 2 episodes
2023–2025	Strife	Lucy	TV series, 9 episodes
2026	The Killings at Parrish Station	Older Frankie Cook	TV series: 6 episodes
