= Susie Porter =

Australian actress

Susie carol Porter
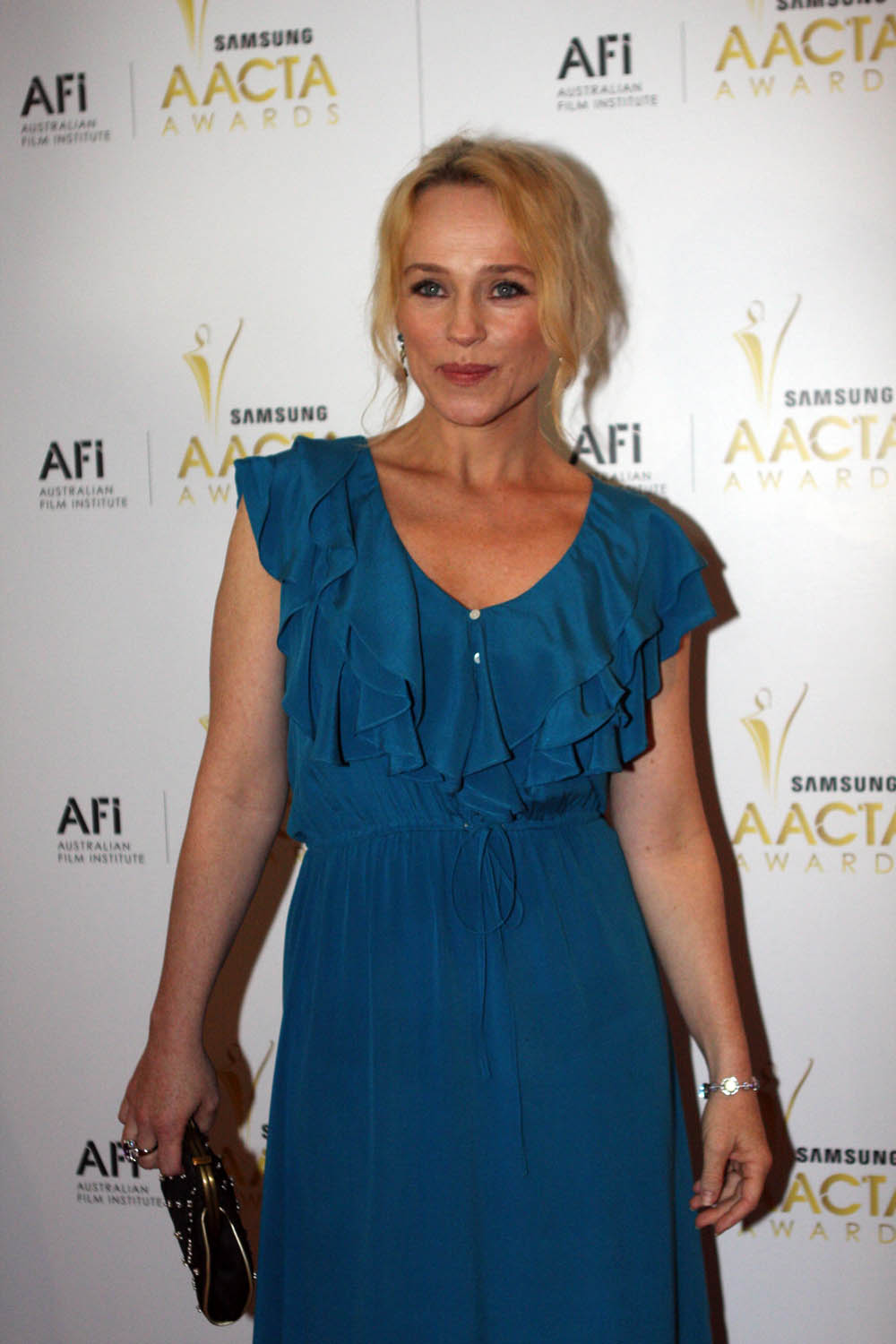
- Susie Porter in 2012
- Born: 1970 or 1971 (age 55–56); Newcastle, New South Wales, Australia
- Education: National Institute of Dramatic Art (BFA)
- Occupation: Actress
- Years active: 1996–present
- Known for: Wentworth; East West 101
- Spouse: Christopher Mordue (m. 2010)

Susie Porter (born 1971) is an Australian television, film and theatre actress. She made her debut in the 1996 film Idiot Box, before rising to prominence in films including Paradise Road (1997), Welcome to Woop Woop (1997), Two Hands (1999), Better Than Sex (2000), The Monkey's Mask (2000), Mullet (2001), Teesh and Trude (2002), and The Caterpillar Wish (2006). Porter is also well recognised for her roles in television series, most notably, as Patricia Wright in East West 101, Eve Pritchard in East of Everything, Kay Parker in Sisters of War, and Marie Winter in the prison drama, Wentworth.

== Early life ==
Porter was born in Newcastle, New South Wales, to Bill, a doctor, and Jenny, a nurse. She has two older sisters, Cathy and Jackie, and a younger sister, Louise. Porter attended Newcastle Grammar School and earned a Bachelor of Arts from the University of Newcastle. She graduated from the National Institute of Dramatic Art (NIDA) in 1995. Porter revealed in 2024 in an interview with 9honey that she was originally going to audition at the Western Australian Academy of Performing Arts but ended up with food poisoning and couldn't attend that audition.

Porter was one of eight girls injured in a gas explosion near the Newcastle Obelisk in 1985.

== Personal life ==
Porter married Christopher Mordue in 2010.

Porter is a wildlife advocate and is a wildlife ambassador for World Animal Protection.

In 2022, she penned a letter to the NSW State Government urging the then Agriculture Minister, Dugald Saunders, to put an end to all puppy farms in the state.

== Acting career ==
=== Television ===
Porter began her acting career in an episode of House Gang, a short lived television program. She then had small roles in other Australian television programs in the late 1990s, including Big Sky, Wildside and Water Rats.

In 2006, Porter had a leading role in RAN, an Australian mini-series, which won her a Best Leading Actress in a Television Drama at the AFI Awards. In late 2007, she appeared in East West 101, a six-part drama series that aired on SBS. In 2008, Porter appeared in East of Everything (a six-part drama series that aired on the ABC) and in the mini-series Make Or Break (an English and Australian production that aired on Foxtel's UKTV).

In 2009, Porter appeared on the second seasons of both East of Everything and East West 101, and first run The Jesters and My Place. In 2010, she appeared on the telemovie Sisters of War as Kay Parker. In 2011, she appeared in the third, and final season, of East West 101. In 2012, she appeared on Channel Ten's mini-series Bikie Wars: Brothers in Arms. She played Pam Knight in Puberty Blues from 2012 to 2014.

In 2017, Porter was cast in the Foxtel drama series Wentworth in the main role Marie Winter; the role was originally portrayed by Maggie Millar in Prisoner. Porter first appeared in Wentworth during the fourth episode of the sixth season, broadcast on 10 July 2018. She reprised her role as Marie Winter in the seventh season in 2019, and again in the eighth and final season which premiered in 2020 and ended in 2021. She made her final appearance in penultimate episode of the final season.

In 2024, Porter was named in the cast for ABC drama Plum.

In December 2022, Porter was named in the cast for the new Disney+ series The Artful Dodger. On 3 February 2025, a cast announcement for the second series of The Artful Dodger confirmed that Porter would reprise her role as Lady Jane Fox from series one.

=== Film ===
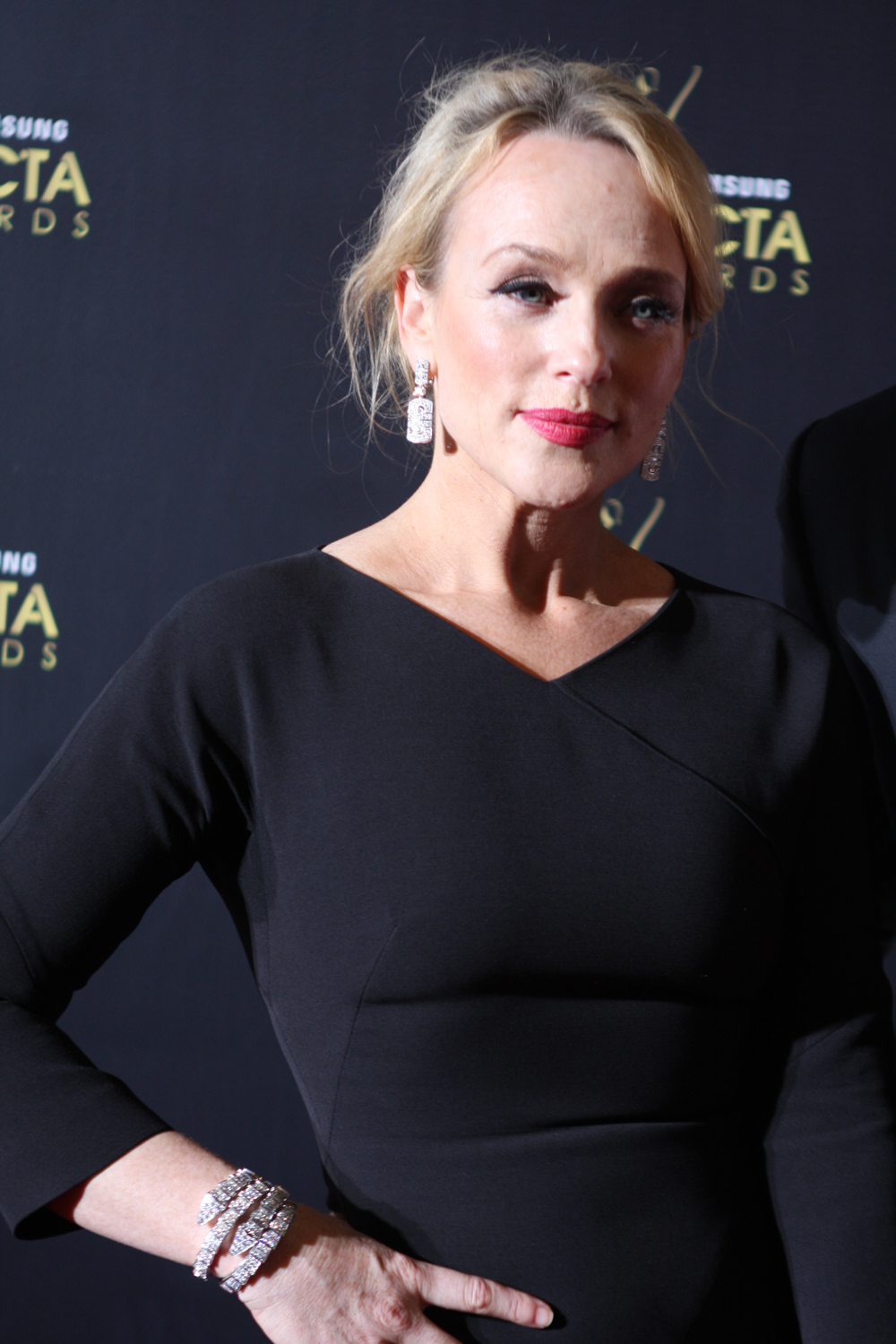
Susie Porter in 2012

In 1996, Porter made her film debut in Idiot Box. In 1997, she starred as Angie in the Australian comedy Welcome to Woop Woop. In 1999, she had a major role in Two Hands. In 2000, she starred in the film Bootmen and in the crime drama film The Monkey's Mask, which she plays a lesbian private detective who falls in love with a suspect, for which she won the award for 'Best Actress' at the Dallas OUT TAKES festival in 2001. In 2001, she appeared in the Australian movie Mullet and had a small role in Star Wars: Episode II – Attack of the Clones.

In 2005, Porter had a supporting role in the Australian film Little Fish. In 2006, she had a role in the film The Caterpillar Wish which won her Best Supporting Actress in the AFI Awards.

In 2015, Porter starred in Is This the Real World.

Porter appeared in 2022 film Gold which was filmed in South Australia.

In 2023, Porter appeared in the short film Waves at Bondi's Flickerfest.

In 2024, Porter was announced as part of the cast for the film Dirty Boy. On 6 August, Porter was announced as part of the cast for the film Overture. In 2025 Overture would be retitled to The Travelers. In December 2025, Porter was nominated for two AACTA awards for her role in The Travelers and Apple Cider Vinegar.

== Theatre ==
| Date | Title | Role | Notes |
|---|---|---|---|
| 1990 | A Sack Full of Prezzies / Red Santa | | Newcastle Panthers, West Wallsend Workers Club |
| 1991 | Waiting for Lefty | | Community Arts Centre, Hamilton with Hunter Workers Theatre |
| 1991 | Southern Steel | Roz | Playhouse, Newcastle with Hunter Valley Theatre Company |
| 1991 | Aftershocks | Kerry / Fay / Jenny | Playhouse, Newcastle with Hunter Valley Theatre Company |
| 1993 | Mother and Son | Mrs Lind | NIDA Parade Theatre, Sydney |
| 1994 | The Devils | | NIDA Parade Studio, Sydney |
| 1994 | Three Sisters | Masha | NIDA Parade Studio, Sydney |
| 1994 | The Merchant of Venice | Launcelot / Servant | NIDA Parade Theatre, Sydney |
| 1994 | Epsom Downs | Ghost of Emily Davidson | NIDA Parade Theatre, Sydney |
| 1994 | Did You Hear The One About The Irishman...? | | NIDA Parade Theatre, Sydney |
| 1995 | A View From the Bridge | Beatrice | NIDA Parade Theatre, Sydney |
| 1995 | Guys and Dolls | Martha / Dancer | NIDA Parade Theatre, Sydney |
| 1995 | Ghetto | Hayyah | NIDA Parade Theatre, Sydney |
| 1996 | Somewhere in the Darkness | Sally | Wharf Theatre, Sydney with Sydney Theatre Company |
| 2000 | Sweet Phoebe | | Stables Theatre with Griffin Theatre Company |
| 2001 | The Vagina Monologues | | Valhalla Cinema, Sydney |
| 2005 | Broken Valley | | Belvoir Theatre |
| 2006 | The Emperor of Sydney | | Stables Theatre, Sydney with Griffin Theatre Company |
| 2007 | Riflemind | Cindy | Wharf Theatre with Sydney Theatre Company |
| 2010 | That Face | Martha | Belvoir Theatre |
| 2011 | Summer of the Seventeenth Doll | Olive | Belvoir Theatre |
| 2015 | Death and the Maiden | Paulina | Southbank Theatre with Melbourne Theatre Company, Sydney Theatre Company |

== Filmography ==
=== Film ===
| Year | Title | Role | Notes |
|---|---|---|---|
| 1996 | Idiot Box | Betty | Feature film |
| 1996 | Mr. Reliable | Fay | Feature film |
| 1997 | Paradise Road | Oggi | Feature film |
| 1997 | Welcome to Woop Woop | Angie | Feature film |
| 1998 | Amy | Anny Buchanan | Feature film |
| 1998 | Aftershocks | Marg Turnbull | TV movie |
| 1999 | Two Hands | Deirdre | Feature film |
| 1999 | Feeling Sexy | Vicki | Feature film |
| 2000 | Better Than Sex | Cin | Feature film |
| 2000 | The Monkey's Mask | Jill Fitzpatrick | Feature film |
| 2000 | Bootmen | Sara | Feature film |
| 2001 | Mullet | Tully | Feature film |
| 2002 | Sway | Emma | Feature film |
| 2002 | Star Wars: Episode II – Attack of the Clones | Hermione Bagwa / WA-7 | Feature film |
| 2002 | Teesh and Trude | Letitia (Teesh) | Feature film |
| 2005 | Cool | Lucy | Short film |
| 2005 | Little Fish | Jenny Moss | Feature film |
| 2006 | The Caterpillar Wish | Susan Woodbridge | Feature film |
| 2006 | No Mail | Antonia Short | Short film |
| 2007 | The Manual | Mai | Short film |
| 2007 | Flipsical | Sue | Short film |
| 2009 | Lonely | Mum | Short film |
| 2010 | Summer Coda | Angela | Feature film |
| 2010 | Sisters of War | Kay Parker | TV movie |
| 2012 | Dangerous Remedy | Peggy Berman | TV movie |
| 2016 | Rod Taylor: Pulling No Punches | Herself | Feature film documentary |
| 2017 | Don't Tell | Sue | Feature film |
| 2017 | Hounds of Love | Maggie Maloney | Feature film |
| 2017 | Cargo | Kay Caine | Feature film |
| 2018 | Ladies in Black | Mrs. Miles | Feature film |
| 2018 | The Second | The Muse | Feature film |
| 2022 | Gold | The Stranger, The Stranger's Sister | Feature film |
| 2023 | Transfusion | Magistrate | Feature film |
| 2023 | Waves | Sam | Short film |
| 2023 | An Ordinary Day | | Feature film |
| 2023 | Mercy Road | | |
| 2024 | In The Room Where He Waits | Mum | |
| 2024 | Dirty Boy | Verity Wentworth | Feature film |
| 2025 | The Travellers | Nikki | Film |

=== Television ===
| Year | Title | Role | Notes | Ref |
|---|---|---|---|---|
| 1996 | Beck | TV reporter | TV series, 1 episode | |
| 1996 | House Gang | Bottle Shop Girl | TV series, episode: "Truth or Dare" | |
| 1997 | Big Sky | Tracy | TV series, episode: "Duke of Yarragul" | |
| 1998 | Wildside | Debbie | TV series, episodes: "1.6", "1.7" | |
| 1998 | Children's Hospital | Frances Clarke | TV series, episode: "Tears Before Bedtime" | |
| 1998 | Water Rats | Julie Drummond | TV series, episode: "Heads or Tales" | |
| 2001 | The Secret Life of Us | Pandora | TV series, episode: "Secrets and Lies" | |
| 2003 | State of Play | Susan Sagattchean | TV miniseries | |
| 2003 | Silent Witness | Maxine Croft | TV series, 2 episodes: "Answering Fire": Part 1 & Part 2 | |
| 2006 | RAN Remote Area Nurse | Helen Tremaine | TV series, 6 episodes | |
| 2006 | Love My Way | Christine | TV series, 4 episodes | |
| 2006 | Nightmares & Dreamscapes: From the Stories of Stephen King | Sally Blair Kinnell | TV series, episode: "The Road Virus Heads North" | |
| 2006 | Two Twisted | Sam | TV series, episode: "Delivery Man" | |
| 2007–11 | East West 101 | Detective Superintendent Patricia Wright | TV series, 20 episodes | |
| 2008–09 | East of Everything | Eve Pritchard | TV series, 13 episodes | |
| 2009 | My Place | Miss Muller | TV series, 7 episodes | |
| 2009–11 | The Jesters | Julia Wilson | TV series, 16 episodes | |
| 2012–14 | Puberty Blues | Pam Knight | TV series | |
| 2012 | Dance Academy | Anne Black | TV series, 3 episodes | |
| 2012 | Bikie Wars: Brothers in Arms | Vanessa Ross | TV miniseries | |
| 2012 | Problems | Mrs Moth | TV series, 4 episodes | |
| 2013 | Underbelly: Squizzy | Rose Taylor | TV series, 6 episodes | |
| 2014 | It's a Date | Jocelyn | TV series, 1 episode | |
| 2014–15 | Plonk | Evelyn Tyler | TV series, 4 episodes | |
| 2017 | Seven Types of Ambiguity | Gina Serkin | TV series, 4 episodes | |
| 2017 | Janet King | Maxine Reynolds | TV series, 6 episodes | |
| 2017 | Pulse | Maggie Cutter | TV series, 7 episodes | |
| 2018–21 | Wentworth | Marie Winter | TV series, season 6−8, 38 episodes | |
| 2020 | Hungry Ghosts | Catherine Taylor | TV series, 3 episodes | |
| 2021 | The Unusual Suspects | Rae | TV miniseries, 2 episodes | |
| 2022 | Irreverent | Agnes | TV miniseries, 5 episodes | |
| 2022 | Grey Nomads | Barb | TV series, 6 episodes | |
| 2023 | No Escape | Chief Inspector Sarah Craven | TV series, 7 episodes | |
| 2023–present | The Artful Dodger | Lady Jane Fox | TV series, 15 episodes | |
| 2024 | Plum | Sarah Lum | TV series, 2 episodes | |
| 2025 | Apple Cider Vinegar | Tamara | TV series: 4 episodes | |
| 2026 | The F Ward | Dr Pip Matessi | TV series: 1 episode (1.4) | |

=== Other appearances ===
| Year | Title | Role | Notes |
|---|---|---|---|
| 2021 | Wentworth Unlocked | Herself | TV special |
| 2021 | Today | Guest | TV series, 1 episode |
| 2020 | Wentworth: Behind the Bars 2 | Herself | TV special |
| 2019 | Wentworth: Behind the Bars | Herself | TV special |
| 2019 | Screen | Herself | TV series, 1 episode |
| 2019 | TV Week Logie Awards | Herself | TV special |
| 2014 | The Living Room | Guest | TV series, 1 episode |
| 2013 | Who Do You Think You Are? | Herself | TV series, episode: "Susie Porter" |
| 2002 | Cleo Bachelor 2002: Real Men Revealed | Herself | TV special |
| 2001 | Rove | Guest | TV series: 1 episode |
| 2000 | The Movie Show | Guest | TV series, 1 episode |

== Awards ==
| Year | Work | Award | Category | Result |
|---|---|---|---|---|
| 1999 | Feeling Sexy | FCCA Awards | Best Actress | Nominated |
| 1999 | Two Hands | FCCA Awards | Best Supporting Actress | Won |
| 1999 | Two Hands | AFI Awards | Best Supporting Actress | Nominated |
| 2000 | Better Than Sex | AFI Awards | Best Actress in a Leading Role | Nominated |
| 2001 | Better Than Sex | FCCA Awards | Best Actress | Nominated |
| 2001 | Mullet | IF Awards | Best Actress | Nominated |
| 2001 | The Monkey's Mask | Dallas Out Takes | Best Actress | Won |
| 2002 | The Monkey's Mask | FCCA Awards | Best Actress | Nominated |
| 2003 | Teesh and Trude | AFI Awards | Best Actress in a Leading Role | Nominated |
| 2003 | Teesh and Trude | FCCA Awards | Best Actress | Nominated |
| 2006 | The Caterpillar Wish | AFI Awards | Best Supporting Actress | Won |
| 2006 | The Caterpillar Wish | FCCA Awards | Best Supporting Actress | Nominated |
| 2006 | RAN | AFI Awards | Best Lead Actress in Television Drama | Won |
| 2007 | RAN | Logie Awards | Most Outstanding Actress | Won |
| 2010 | East West 101 | AFI Awards | Best Lead Actress in Television Drama | Won |
| 2010 | East West 101 | Logie Awards | Most Outstanding Actress | Nominated |
| 2011 | Summer of the Seventeenth Doll | Sydney Theatre Awards | Best Actress in a Leading Role of a Mainstage Production | Nominated |
| 2012 | Sisters of War | AFI Awards | Best Guest or Supporting Actress in a Television Drama | Nominated |
| 2012 | The Jesters | Equity Ensemble Awards | Outstanding Performance by an Ensemble in a Comedy Series | Nominated |
| 2012 | East West 101 | Equity Ensemble Awards | Outstanding Performance by an Ensemble in a Drama Series | Won |
| 2013 | Dangerous Remedy | Logie Awards | Most Outstanding Actress | Nominated |
| 2013 | Dangerous Remedy | AFI Awards | Best Lead Actress in a Television Drama | Nominated |
| 2013 | Puberty Blues | Equity Ensemble Awards | Outstanding Performance by an Ensemble in a Drama Series | Nominated |
| 2014 | Underbelly: Squizzy | Equity Ensemble Awards | Outstanding Performance by an Ensemble in a Miniseries or Telemovie | Nominated |
| 2017 | Hounds of Love | AFI Awards | Best Supporting Actress | Nominated |
| 2017 | Hounds of Love | FCCA Awards | Best Supporting Actress | Won |
| 2018 | Seven Types of Ambiguity | Equity Ensemble Awards | Outstanding Performance by an Ensemble in a Drama Series | Won |
| 2019 | Wentworth | Equity Ensemble Awards | Outstanding Performance by an Ensemble in a Drama Series | Nominated |
| 2019 | Cargo | Australian Film Critics Association Awards | Best Supporting Actress | Nominated |
| 2019 | Cargo | FCCA Awards | Best Supporting Actress | Nominated |
| 2019 | The Second | Logie Awards | Most Outstanding Supporting Actress | Nominated |
| 2021 | Hungry Ghosts | Equity Ensemble Awards | Outstanding Performance by an Ensemble in a Drama Series | Won |
| 2026 | Apple Cider Vinegar | AACTA Awards | Best Supporting Actress in a Drama | Nominated |
| 2026 | The Travellers | AACTA Awards | Best Lead Actress in Film | Nominated |
