= Stranded (2005 film) =

- Directed by: Stuart McDonald
- Written by: Kathleen O'Brien
- Produced by: Lizzette Atkins; Beth Frey
- Starring: Emma Lung; Emily Browning
- Cinematography: Greig Fraser
- Edited by: Bill Murphy
- Release date: 2005 (Melbourne Film Festival)
- Running time: 52min
- Country: Australia
- Language: English

Stranded is a 2005 Australian short film directed by Stuart McDonald and starring Emma Lung and Emily Browning. It won the Film Critics Circle of Australia Award for Best Australian Short Film in 2006.

== Cast ==
- Emma Lung - Claudia
- Emily Browning - Penny
- Robert Morgan - Rex
- David Hoflin - Cam
- Nicki Wendt - Linda
- Ross Thompson - Earnest Vinnie
- Damien Richardson - Eager Vinnie
- Kodi Smit-McPhee - Teddy

== Reception ==
Debi Enker writes in The Age "In spite of the darkness of the material and a bleak representation of suburban life, McDonald balances the drama with a wry humour, celebrating the inventive and rebellious spirit of his teenagers as O'Brien's script offers some hopeful, if unexpected, resolutions for the characters." The NT News calls it "a fresh new Australian drama." Writing in The Herald Sun Robert Fidgeon concludes "Solid going, but deserves your support."

Lung won the 2006 Australian Film Institute's Industry Awards award for Outstanding Achievement in Short Film Screen Craft and the 2007 Logie awards Graham Kennedy Award For Most Outstanding New Talent for her role.
