= Answered by Fire =

2006 television film

- Written by: Barbara Samuels; Katherine Thomson
- Directed by: Jessica Hobbs
- Starring: David Wenham; Isabelle Blais; Alex Tilman
- Theme music composer: Michel Corriveau
- Countries of origin: Canada; Australia
- Original languages: English; Tetum; Indonesian
- No. of episodes: 2

Production
- Producers: Justin Bodle; Mikael Borglund
- Cinematography: Mark Wareham
- Editors: Dominique Fortin; Geoffrey Lamb
- Running time: 190 minutes
- Production companies: Beyond Simpson Le Mesurier; Terra Rossa Pictures; Muse Entertainment

Original release
- Network: ABC; CBC
- Release: 28 May 2006

Answered by Fire is a two-part television film based on the 1999 conflicts in East Timor that led to its independence in 2002. The film is based on "Dancing with the Devil: A Personal Account of Policing the East Timor Vote for Independence", which was written by David Savage, an Australian Federal Police Officer who was based in Maliana during the vote and where the fictional "Nunura" is based, who returned to East Timor to lead investigations into the crimes against humanity committed there. The book is published by Monash University Asia Institute, Melbourne. David Savage was a technical and script consultant during the filming and also played a minor role.

The film stars David Wenham, Isabelle Blais and Alex Tilman. It is a co-production between ABC in Australia and CBC in Canada and was also shown in Portugal on RTP as Timor: A Ferro e Fogo (literally "Timor: By Iron and Fire") with Portuguese subtitles. It has also been shown on the Australia Network, which is available in Indonesia via satellite and cable, as well as other countries in Asia and the Pacific and ION Television in the United States. It was released on DVD in Brazil as Resposta à Bala (literally "Answered by the Bullet") with a dubbed soundtrack in Brazilian Portuguese.

The film was filmed in areas of Queensland, Australia. Many of the extras and some of the minor characters were East Timorese locals, who had been living in the regions affected by violence during the crisis. Some found themselves disoriented by the accuracy of the sets and locations for their resemblance to areas of East Timor.

The film won two awards from Australian Film Institute (AFI).

== The story ==
The story is a fictionalised account of a team of international observers, primarily police officers from nations such as Canada and Australia, working on behalf of the UN in order to arrange and run the vote for independence in East Timor, against strong and violent opposition from pro-Indonesian militia forces in 1999. As the vote gets closer, violence escalates, and finally the UN team is forced to pull out of their base of operations as the threat becomes too high.

== Part 1 ==
Mark Waldman (David Wenham), an Australian Federal Police officer is sent to East Timor as part of the (UN Assistance Mission in East Timor) UNAMET, to oversee the registration of East Timorese voters and run the independence ballot. However, from the onset, it is obvious that many groups at a community level are attempting to subvert UN authority, taking advantage of the unarmed status of the Officers, and their corrupt ties and influence over both the Indonesian military and the East Timorese Police. Joining Waldman is Julie Fortin (Isabelle Blais), a Canadian RCMP police officer and Ismenio Soares (Alex Tilman), a Timorese university graduate assigned to translate for the UN team.

It is obvious early on that not all is well in the troubled region, with massacres of entire families leaving no doubt in the mind of the UN officers that the Pro-Indonesian Militia are attempting to subvert the independence proceedings via strong-arm tactics over the population. The list of voters seems to be becoming a death-list, scaring more and more from registering themselves. Travelling from their compound in Nunura, the UN team frequently are confronted, although on 30 August 1999 the registration count confirms that almost 90% of the total population has successfully registered to vote. Later, in September, the vote goes ahead, with a 78% majority favouring an independent East Timor. Immediately the violence begins, with Indonesian Military and militia carrying out a scorched earth campaign, removing 'vital assets', the UN team is forced to evacuate. However the evacuation forces the UN to abandon many of its indigenous supporters, including Ismenio and his family who are known by the militia to be independence supporters.

== Part 2 ==
The UN compound in Dili is no better off than that in Nunura, being bombarded with molotov cocktails and rocks through the night. Refugees from the surrounding city flee and make camps outside, in an attempt to defend themselves against murderous mobs who now control the streets. In one attack the refugees attempt to enter the compound but are stopped only by their own sheer weight in numbers, some climbing the barbed wire fences in order to escape the militia. Eventually the UN is forced to pull back to Darwin, leaving all behind to face the militia alone.

Ismenio is found in a church in Nunura by militia, who after removing him from a crowd of locals, massacre all inside and burning the church, an event bearing much resemblance to the Liquiçá Church Massacre. Ismenio is taken to his former home, where he sees his father murdered and his sister raped by a contingent of military and militia figures. Ismenio escapes when his home is burned down, and steals ID papers from his cousin, who is working with the militia. He travels to West Timor to rescue his sister, who he takes back to East Timor. On the way though, they are forced to hide when a truck of soldiers arrives, the soldiers capturing them.

In Australia, Waldman is racked with the guilt of having to leave so many behind, his feelings compounded by the 'life goes on' attitude many Australians had toward the East Timor crisis. After his friend commits suicide from the guilt of failing his East Timorese friends, he returns to Nunura after the Australian Government gains the approval of the UN Security Council, and the Australian Defence Force leads INTERFET to stabilise the territory. In Nunura he meets Julie Fortin, who is desperately searching for Ismenio. However Ismenio was captured by INTERFET soldiers, and is released by Waldman.

The grim process of locating victims of the campaign begins, with the bodies of those burned in the church found submerged in a lake. Eventually the body of Ismenio's father is recovered, buried in a shallow grave. However upon capturing one of the few militiamen who did not escape into West Timor, Waldman is able to trick him into bringing one of the main militia leaders out of hiding, bringing him to justice.

The final card tells us of the numbers of militia who are still granted asylum by the Indonesians, not pursued by the Australian Government in an attempt maintain the uneasy relationship between the two nations.
