= Emily Barclay =

New Zealand actress (born 1984)

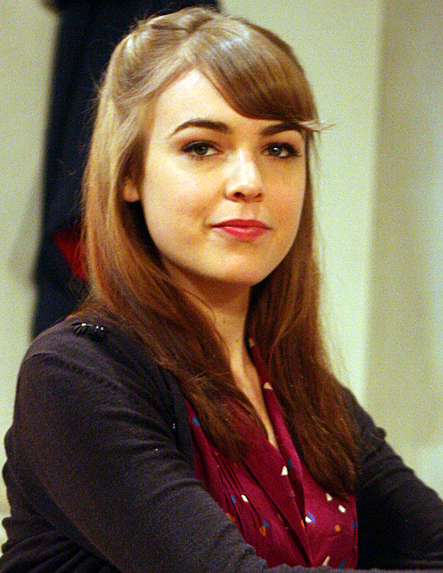
- Barclay in 2012
- Born: 24 October 1984 (age 42); Plymouth, Devon, England, UK
- Occupation: Actress
- Years active: 1998–present
- Spouse: Thomas Ward (m. 2023)
- Children: 2
- Relatives: Charlotte Dawson (aunt)

Emily Barclay (born 24 October 1984) is a British-born New Zealander actress, whose work has been recognized by the British Independent Film Awards and the Australian Film Institute Awards.

== Career ==
Emily Barclay was born in Plymouth to a General practitioner and a landscape designer, and raised in Auckland, New Zealand, where she went to an all-girls school and attended Saturday morning drama classes. At the age of nine, Barclay played Hamlet in a school production and decided to become an actress. At the age of 13, she got herself an agent and supported herself between TV movies by working in a video store.

Diana Rowan (the same casting agent who discovered Anna Paquin and Keisha Castle-Hughes) discovered Barclay in a school play and cast her as Celia in 2004's In My Father's Den, that raised the actress to prominence. For that film, Barclay won Most Promising Newcomer at the 2005 British Independent Film Awards. She followed by moving to Australia – while continuing part-time with her degree in English and gender studies at the University of Auckland – for a role in the critically acclaimed 2006 crime drama Suburban Mayhem directed by Paul Goldman, for which she collected an AFI Award for Best Actress.

Barclay's performance also lead to an invitation to her first stage performance, on Neil Armfield's 2009 production of Gethsemane in Sydney. Armfield later indicated Barclay to Lee Lewis, who cast her in the play That Face. In 2011, she performed in another Belvoir production, The Seagull, and acted opposite Geoffrey Rush in the Melbourne Theatre Company's The Importance of Being Earnest. In 2012, Barclay performed opposite Hollywood actors Michael Cera and Kieran Culkin in This Is Our Youth, returned to Belvoir with Strange Interlude and debuted at London's Young Vic performing on Three Sisters.

Barclay is currently represented by United Agents.

Barclay also starred in the music video "Big Jet Plane" by Angus & Julia Stone which was directed by Kiku Ohe in 2010.

She has cited her favourite actor as being Ewen Leslie.

On 23 June 2026, Barclay was named in the cast for ABC series The Great White.

== Animal rights ==
Barclay is a vegan and has had an active involvement in animal rights, working with the organisation Save Animals From Exploitation (SAFE) in anti-cruelty campaigns, including an appearance in the 2007 SAFE charity calendar.

== Filmography ==
=== Film ===
Year	Title	Role	Notes
2001	No One Can Hear You	Amy Burchall	
2004	In My Father's Den	Celia Steimer	British Independent Film Award for Most Promising Newcomer; New Zealand Screen Award for Performance by an Actress in a Leading Role
2005	Cockle	Jane	Short
2006	Suburban Mayhem	Katrina Skinner	AACTA Award for Best Leading Actress; IF Award for Best Actress
2009	Prime Mover	Melissa / Calendar Girl	
2010	Zero	Girl	Short
2010	Lou	Rhia	
2010	Legend of the Guardians: The Owls of Ga'Hoole	Gylfie (voice)	
2011	Love Birds	Brenda	
2011	Weekender	Claire	
2012	Mr. Pip	Australian teacher	
2016	The Light Between Oceans	Gwen Potts	
2017	Ellipsis	Viv	
2019	Babyteeth	Toby	
2020	Baby Done	Molly	
2026	Allen	Sarah	

=== Television ===
Year	Title	Role	Notes
1998	Shortland Street	Kelly McKinley	TV series
1999	A Twist in the Tale	Alison Bradley	"The Duellists", "A Ghost of Our Own"
2001	Mercy Peak	Hayley Borden	"Her Secret Passion"
2003	Spin Doctors	Tiffany	"4.2"
2004	Deceit	Katie McCarthy	TV film
2005	Kidnapped	Maddy	TV film
2006	The Silence	Evelyn Hutchison	TV film
2009	Piece of My Heart	Young Flora	TV film New Zealand Film and TV Awards for Best Performance by an Actress in General Television
2010	Lowdown	Abi Hart	"Hart of Darkness"
2015–17	Glitch	Sarah Hayes	Regular role
2015–16	Please Like Me	Ella	Main role
2017	Offspring	Georgie	TV series
2017	Sisters	Casey	TV series
2019	Diary of an Uber Driver	Georgie	TV series
2021	Mr Inbetween	Zoe	TV series
2022	Wolf Like Me	Charlotte	TV series
2026	The F Ward	Dr. Lisa Juracek	TV series: 6 episodes
2027	The Great White	TBA	TV series

=== Stage ===
Year	Title	Role	Notes and awards
2009	Gethsemane	Suzette	
2010	That Face	Mia	
2011	The Seagull	Masha	Nominated – 2012 Sydney Theatre Award: Best Actress in a Supporting Role of a Mainstage Production
2011	The Importance of Being Earnest	Cecily	
2012	This Is Our Youth	Jessica	
2012	Strange Interlude	Nina	
2012	Three Sisters	Natasha	
2013	Hamlet	Ophelia	
