= 69th Sydney Film Festival =

2022 film festival

- Opening film: We Are Still Here by Beck Cole, Dena Curtis, Tracey Rigney, Danielle MacLean, Tim Worrall, Renae Maihi, Miki Magasiva, Mario Gaoa, Richard Curtis, and Chantelle Burgoyne
- Closing film: Broker by Hirokazu Kore-eda
- Location: Sydney, New South Wales, Australia
- Founded: 1954
- Awards: Sydney Film Prize: Close
- No. of films: 200 from 64 countries
- Festival date: 8–19 June 2022
- Website: sff.org.au

Sydney Film Festival
- 70th 68th

The 69th annual Sydney Film Festival was held from 8 to 19 June 2022. First Nations anthology film We Are Still Here opened the festival, while Hirokazu Kore-eda's drama film Broker was the closing film.

The most prestigious award, Sydney Film Prize, was awarded to drama film Close, directed by Lukas Dhont.

== Juries ==
The following were named as the festival juries:

=== Sydney Film Prize ===
- David Wenham, Australian actor and director – Jury President
- Jennifer Peedom, Australian director
- Mostofa Sarwar Farooki, Bangladeshi director
- Semih Kaplanoğlu, Turkish director
- Yuka Sakano, executive director of the Kawakita Memorial Film Institute

== Official Selection ==
=== In competition ===
The following films were selected for the main international competition:

English title	Original title	Director(s)	Production country
Alcarràs		Carla Simón	Spain, Italy
Before, Now & Then	Nana	Kamila Andini	Indonesia
Blaze		Del Kathryn Barton	Australia
The Box	La caja	Lorenzo Vigas	Mexico, United States, Venezuela
Burning Days	Kurak Günler	Emin Alper	Turkey, France, Germany, Netherlands, Greece, Croatia
Close		Lukas Dhont	Belgium, France, Netherlands
Fire of Love		Sara Dosa	United States, Canada
Godland	Volaða land	Hlynur Pálmason	Iceland, Denmark, France, Sweden
The Quiet Girl	An Cailín Ciúin	Colm Bairéad	Ireland
Return to Seoul	Retour à Séoul	Davy Chou	France, Belgium, Germany, Qatar, Cambodia
Utama		Alejandro Loayza Grisi	Bolivia, Uruguay, France
You Won't Be Alone		Goran Stolevski	Australia, United Kingdom, Serbia

Highlighted title indicates Sydney Film Prize winner.

=== Documentary Australia ===
English title	Original title	Director(s)	Production country
Audrey Napanangka		Penelope McDonald	Australia
Delikado		Karl Malakunas	Australia, Hong Kong, United States, Philippines, United Kingdom
Everybody's Oma		Jason van Genderen	Australia
General Hercules		Broodie Poole	Australia
Keep Stepping		Luke Cornish	Australia
Short Films
The Dreamlife of Georgie Stone		Maya Newell	Australia
Polenta		Adrian Di Salle	Australia
The Sweetness		Jessica Barclay Lawton	Australia
Warrawong... The Windy Place on the Hill		Simon Target	Australia

=== Special Presentations ===
English title	Original title	Director(s)	Production country
Cha Cha Real Smooth		Cooper Raiff	United States
Fire Island		Andrew Ahn	United States
The Forgiven		John Michael McDonagh	United Kingdom
Good Luck to You, Leo Grande		Sophie Hyde	United Kingdom
Huda's Salon		Hany Abu-Assad	Palestine, Egypt, Netherlands
Lonesome		Craig Boreham	Australia
Navalny		Daniel Roher	United States
Nude Tuesday		Armağan Ballantyne	Australia, New Zealand
One Fine Morning	Un beau matin	Mia Hansen-Løve	France, Germany
The Passengers of the Night	Les passagers de la nuit	Mikhaël Hers	France
The Phantom of the Open		Craig Roberts	United Kingdom
Seriously Red		Gracie Otto	Australia
Tchaikovsky's Wife	Жена Чайковского	Kirill Serebrennikov	Russia, France, Switzerland
Where Is Anne Frank		Ari Folman	France, Belgium, Netherlands, Luxembourg

=== Features ===
English title	Original title	Director(s)	Production country
A E I O U: A Quick Alphabet of Love	A E I O U: Das schnelle Alphabet der Liebe	Nicolette Krebitz	Germany, France
Ahed's Knee	הַבֶּרֶךְ	Nadav Lapid	France, Germany
Alice		Krystin Ver Linden	United States
Anatolian Leopard	Anadolu leopari	Emre Kayiş	Turkey, Denmark, Germany, Poland
Anatomy of Time		Jakrawal Nilthamrong	Thailand, France, Singapore, Netherlands
The Blind Man Who Did Not Want to See Titanic	Sokea mies joka ei halunnut nähdä Titanicia	Teemu Nikki	Finland
The Burning Sea	Nordsjøen	John Andreas Andersen	Norway
Commitment Hasan	Bağlılık Hasan	Semih Kaplanoğlu	Turkey
Costa Brava, Lebanon		Mounia Akl	Lebanon, France, Spain, Sweden, Denmark, Norway, Qatar
Emily the Criminal		John Patton Ford	United States
Evicted! A Modern Romance		Rowan Devereux	Australia
Fairy Folk		Karan Gour	India
Father's Day		Kivu Ruhorahoza	Rwanda
Flux Gourmet		Peter Strickland	United Kingdom, United States, Hungary
Gentle	Szelíd	László Csuja, Anna Nemes	Hungary, Germany
Hinterland		Stefan Ruzowitzky	Austria, Luxembourg
Hommage	오마주	Shin Su-won	South Korea
The Humans		Stephen Karam	United States
Incredible but True	Incroyable mais vrai	Quentin Dupieux	France
Inu-Oh		Masaaki Yuasa	Japan, China
Klondike	Клондайк	Maryna Er Gorbach	Ukraine, Turkey
The Longest Weekend		Molly Haddon	Australia
A Love Song		Max Walker-Silverman	United States
Millie Lies Low		Michelle Savill	New Zealand
No Land's Man		Mostofa Sarwar Farooki	United States, India, Australia, Bangladesh
Nr. 10		Alex van Warmerdam	Netherlands, Belgium
One Year, One Night	Un año, una noche	Isaki Lacuesta	France, Spain
The Outfit		Graham Moore	United States
The Plains		David Easteal	Australia
Please Baby Please		Amanda Kramer	United States
Private Desert	Deserto particular	Aly Muritiba	Brazil, Portugal
Return to Dust	隐入尘烟	Li Ruijun	China
Rimini		Ulrich Seidl	Austria, France, Germany
The Stranger	الغريب	Ameer Fakher Eldin	Palestine, Germany, Syria, Qatar
The Tasting	La Dégustation	Ivan Calbérac	France
Unrest	Unrueh	Cyril Schäublin	Switzerland
Yuni		Kamila Andini	Indonesia, Singapore, France, Australia

=== International Documentaries ===
English title	Original title	Director(s)	Production country
African Moot		Shameela Seedat	South Africa, Finland
All That Breathes		Shaunak Sen	India, United Kingdom, United States
And Still I Sing		Fazila Amiri	Canada
Beirut: Eye of the Storm	بيروت في عين العاصفة	Mai Masri	Lebanon, France
Bitterbrush		Emelie Coleman Mahdavian	United States
Black Mambas		Lena Karbe	Germany, France
Calendar Girls		Love Martinsen, Maria Loohufvud	Sweden, United States
Children of the Mist	Những đứa trẻ trong sương	Hà Lệ Diễm	Vietnam
Day After...	Anyadin	Kamar Ahmad Simon	Bangladesh, France, Norway
Dreaming Walls: Inside the Chelsea Hotel		Amélie van Elmbt, Maya Duverdier	United States, Belgium, France, Netherlands, Sweden
Fashion Babylon		Gianluca Matarrese	France
Fashion Reimagined		Becky Hutner	United Kingdom, United States
Hidden Letters	密语者	Violet Du Feng, Qing Zhao	China, Germany, Norway, United States
Hide and Seek	Nascondino	Victoria Fiore	United Kingdom, Italy
Holidays	Jours de Fête	Antoine Cattin	Switzerland
A House Made of Splinters	Будинок із трісок	Simon Lereng Wilmont	Denmark
Into the Ice	Rejsen til isens indre	Lars Ostenfeld	Denmark, Germany
Kurt Vonnegut: Unstuck in Time		Robert B. Weide, Don Argott	United States
Lynch/Oz		Alexandre O. Philippe	United States
Midwives		Hnin Ei Hlaing	Myanmar
My Old School		Jono McLeod	United Kingdom
No Simple Way Home	Nie ma prostej drogi do domu	Akuol de Mabior	South Sudan, Kenya
Nothing Lasts Forever		Jason Kohn	United States
Singing in the Wilderness	旷野歌声	Dongnan Chen	China
The Territory		Alex Pritz	Brazil, Denmark, United States, United Kingdom
Tramps!		Kevin Hegge	Canada
We Met in Virtual Reality		Joe Hunting	United Kingdom
Young Plato		Neasa Ní Chianáin, Declan McGrath	Ireland, United Kingdom, France, Belgium

=== Sounds on Screen ===
English title	Original title	Director(s)	Production country
6 Festivals		Macario de Souza	Australia
Jazz Fest: A New Orleans Story		Frank Marshall, Ryan Suffern	United States
Meet Me in the Bathroom		Will Lovelace, Dylan Southern	United Kingdom
Sirens	سايرنز	Rita Baghdadi	United States, Lebanon

=== Europe! Voices of Women in Film ===
English title	Original title	Director(s)	Production country
As in Heaven	Du som er i himlen	Tea Lindeburg	Denmark
Bitch, A Derogatory Term for a Woman	Prasica, slabšalni izraz za žensko	Tijana Zinajić	Slovenia
Blue Moon	Crai nou	Alina Grigore	Romania
Girl Picture	Tytöt tytöt tytöt	Alli Haapasalo	Finland
It Is In Us All		Antonia Campbell-Hughes	Ireland
Loving Highsmith		Eva Vitija	Switzerland, Germany
Maya Nilo (Laura)		Lovisa Sirén	Sweden, Finland, Belgium
Small Body	Piccolo corpo	Laura Samani	Italy, France, Slovenia
Talking About the Weather	Alle reden übers Wetter	Annika Pinske	Germany
Three Minutes: A Lengthening		Bianca Stigter	Netherlands, United Kingdom

=== First Nations ===
English title	Original title	Director(s)	Production country
Bootlegger		Caroline Monnet	Canada
We Are Still Here (opening)		Beck Cole, Dena Curtis, Tracey Rigney, Danielle MacLean, Tim Worrall, Renae Maihi, Miki Magasiva, Mario Gaoa, Richard Curtis, Chantelle Burgoyne	Australia, New Zealand
Whina		James Napier Robertson, Paula Whetu Jones	New Zealand

=== The Box Sets ===
English title	Original title	Director(s)	Production country	Network
Mystery Road: Origin (6 episodes)		Dylan River	Australia	ABC
True Colours (4 episodes)		Erica Glynn, Steven McGregor	Australia	SBS, National Indigenous Television

=== Freak Me Out ===
English title	Original title	Director(s)	Production country
Dawn Breaks Behind the Eyes	Hinter den Augen die Dämmerung	Kevin Kopacka	Germany
Family Dinner		Peter Hengl	Austria
Leda		Samuel Tressler IV	United States
Piggy	Cerdita	Carlota Pereda	Spain
Saloum		Jean Luc Herbulot	Senegal
Sissy		Hannah Barlow, Kane Senes	Australia

=== Late Announce ===
The following films were announced after the initial line-up announcement, which highlighted the Australian premiere of 2023 Cannes Film Festival official selection:

English title	Original title	Director(s)	Production country
The Blue Caftan	أزرق القفطان	Maryam Touzani	France, Morocco, Belgium, Denmark
Boy from Heaven	صبي من الجنة	Tarik Saleh	Sweden, France, Finland
Broker (closing)	브로커	Hirokazu Kore-eda	South Korea
Holy Spider	عنکبوت مقدس	Ali Abbasi	Denmark, France, Sweden, Germany
Joyland	جوائے لینڈ	Saim Sadiq	Pakistan
Mediterranean Fever	حمى البحر المتوسط	Maha Haj	Germany, France, Qatar, Palestine, Cyprus
The Night of the 12th	La Nuit du 12	Dominik Moll	France, Belgium
Nothing Compares		Kathryn Ferguson	United Kingdom, Ireland
Stars at Noon		Claire Denis	France
Tori and Lokita	Tori et Lokita	Jean-Pierre and Luc Dardenne	Belgium, France
Triangle of Sadness		Ruben Östlund	Sweden, Germany, France, United Kingdom
Will-o'-the-Wisp	Fogo-Fátuo	João Pedro Rodrigues	Portugal, France

== Awards ==
The following awards were presented at the festival:

- Sydney Film Prize: Close by Lukas Dhont
- Sydney UNESCO City of Film Award: Caitlin Yeo
- Documentary Australia Award for Australian Documentary: Keep Stepping by Luke Cornish
- Sustainable Future Award: Delikado by Karl Malakunas
- Dendy Awards for Australian Short Films
  - Dendy Live Action Short Award: The Moths Will Eat Them Up by Luisa Martiri and Tanya Modini
  - Rouben Mamoulian Award for Best Director: Luisa Martiri and Tanya Modini for The Moths Will Eat Them Up
  - Yoram Gross Animation Award: Donkey by Jonathan Daw and Tjunkaya Tapaya
  - AFTRS Craft Award: Jonathan Daw and Tjunkaya Tapaya for Donkey
