= Grace Beside Me =

Australian television series

- Grace Beside Me title card
- Genre: Fantasy drama
- Based on: Grace Beside Me by Sue McPherson
- Developed by: Dena Curtis; Lois Randall; Sue McPherson
- Starring: Kyliric Masella; Tjiirdm McGuire; Mairehau Grace; Charles Passi; Tessa Rose
- Theme music composer: Amanda Brown & Emily Wurramara
- Opening theme: "Grace Beside Me", performed by Emily Wurramara
- Composer: Amanda Brown
- Country of origin: Australia
- Original language: English
- No. of series: 1
- No. of episodes: 13

Production
- Executive producers: Lois Randall; Mary-Ellen Mullane; Libbie Doherty
- Producers: Lois Randall; Dena Curtis
- Running time: 26 minutes
- Production companies: Screen Australia; Magpie Pictures

Original release
- Network: NITV; ABC Me
- Release: 16 February – 11 May 2018

Grace Beside Me is an Australian fantasy drama television series for children which premiered on NITV on 16 February 2018 and later aired on ABC Me. The series is based on the novel Grace Beside Me, by Sue McPherson, and was filmed in the Scenic Rim Region in South East Queensland. The television adaptation was produced by a team composed entirely of women, including Aboriginal screenwriters.

Set in the fictional country town of Laurel Dale, the series follows an Indigenous Australian teenager named Fuzzy Mac, who navigates her way through the social and personal issues of adolescence, while also being faced with the power of being able to communicate with spirits. Overriding themes include the focus on identity and belonging, while family and kinship is also explored. Australian Aboriginal culture is prominently featured, with the series produced in association with Screen Australia's Indigenous Department and the Australian Children's Television Foundation.

Grace Beside Me has received a positive reception for its Australian Aboriginal representation. It was nominated for an AACTA Award for Best Children's Program in 2018, and nominated twice at the Logie Awards for Most Outstanding Children's Program. The program won the First Nations Media Award for Best Drama or Comedy in 2018, and an Australian Directors' Guild Award for the episode "Sorry" in 2019.

== Premise ==
Fuzzy Mac is a 13-year-old Indigenous Australian girl who discovers that she can communicate with spirits. She lives in the small regional community of Laurel Dale with her eccentric grandparents, Nan and Pop, who strive to teach her about tradition and their ancestors. Her family represents a mix of Aboriginal, Irish, and South Sea Islander traditions. Fuzzy's father, Sonny (Lasarus Ratuere), is a FIFO worker in the mines and her mother, died at the age of 19, when Fuzzy was a baby. The pair moved in with Sonny's parents when Fuzzy was born.

Episodes depict Fuzzy's transition into adolescence as she begins high school along with her best friends Tui and Yar. On her 13th birthday, Fuzzy discovers that she can see ghosts and communicate with spirits. Her grandmother guides her as she begins her journey as a seer, and encourages her to fulfill her role of looking after Lola's Forest, a sacred site in Laurel Dale, and all of the spirits living within. Fuzzy comes to terms with her gift and learns how to use it responsibly, as she assists the spirits she encounters in carrying out their incomplete business. Other stories detail the friends' rivalry with their classmates, Cat and Emmy.

== Cast and characters ==
=== Main ===
- Kyliric Masella as Fuzzy Mac, a curious and confident thirteen year old with Aboriginal and Australian South Sea Islander heritage, who has a passion for art. She discovers that she can communicate with spirits.
- Tjiirdm McGuire as Yar, a flamboyant and theatrical friend of Fuzzy's.
- Mairehau Grace as Tui, Fuzzy's best friend, of Māori heritage, who has a love of language and technology.
- Charles Passi as Pop McCardell, Fuzzy's open-minded and witty grandfather, who is Australian South Sea Islander, and plays the bagpipes.
- Tessa Rose as Nan McCardell, Fuzzy's grandmother and a member of the Stolen Generations, with a gift for sensing the dead.

=== Recurring ===
- Simone Landers as Lola, the spirit of Fuzzy's great-grandmother who appears to her as an eleven-year-old girl. She died of natural causes while living in the forest, after escaping the Christian mission. Her spirit is the custodian of Lola's Forest. Pauline Whyman plays the spirit of Lola when she appears to Fuzzy as an older woman.
- Andrew Buchanan as Mayor Ridgeway, Cat's father and the mayor of Laurel Dale, formerly a local sports player.
- Elaine Crombie as Miss Long, Fuzzy's seventh grade teacher.
- Emma Cobb as Cat Ridgeway, a self-absorbed schoolgirl who is the daughter of the mayor.
- Lucy Adair as Emmy Chu, a popular schoolgirl who is not comfortable with sharing her Chinese heritage.
- Roxanne McDonald as Aunty Min, Nan's younger sister, a local historian, who was also removed from her family as a child.
- Ginger Dickens as Esther, Fuzzy's eleven year old cousin living with Aunty Min, who speaks her mind and is known by family as "Special Girl Esther".
- Jack Henry as Mr. Steiner, Fuzzy's grumpy German neighbour with a passion for gardening, who teaches Esther violin.
- Dylan Drabowicz as Jesse, a fourteen year old skater who develops a crush on Tui.
- Peter Sandy as Johnno Buchanan, Fuzzy's boisterous next door neighbour, often getting into trouble with his younger siblings, George and Billy.
- Jada Page as Georgia "George" Buchanan, sister of Johnno and Billy and next door neighbour of Fuzzy.
- Braden Lewis as Billy Buchanan, the youngest of the three Buchanan children who live next door to Fuzzy.
- Michael Fryer as Teddy, a thirteen year old schoolboy who moves to Laurel Dale after his parents' divorce.

=== Guest stars ===
- Lasarus Ratuere as Sonny McCardell, Fuzzy's father, and the son of Nan and Pop, who works in the mines as a FIFO worker.
- Umema Curtis as Grace McCardell, the spirit of Fuzzy's mother who has died, and appears to Fuzzy. Like Fuzzy, she has a talent for drawing, and her totem is the magpie.

== Production ==
=== Background and conception ===
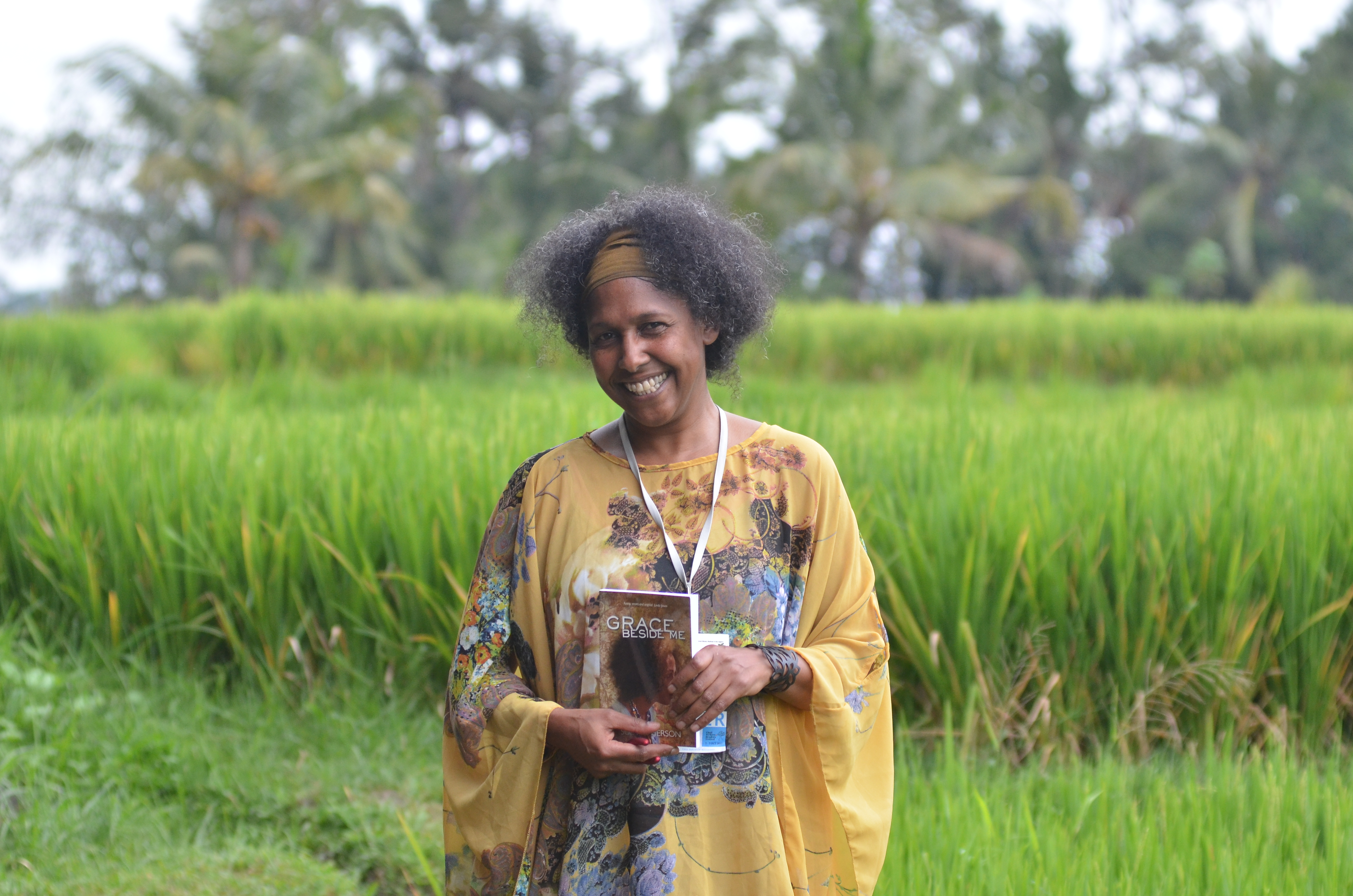
Sue McPherson at Grace Beside Me book launch, 2012

Writer of the 2012 novel Grace Beside Me, Sue McPherson, and producers Lois Randall and Dena Curtis previously adapted the book into a short film, Nan and a Whole Lot of Trouble (2014), supported by the First Nations departments of Screen Australia and the ABC, after Randall's company Magpie Pictures had optioned the book. During post-production, they discussed the idea of expanding it into a series with head of First Nations at Screen Australia Penny Smallacombe. They spoke to Mary-Ellen Mullane at NITV, who were just looking into commissioning children's content for the first time. NITV did not have a big enough funding budget, but Head of Children's and Education at the ABC, Michael Carrington, initiated the possibility of NITV and the ABC co-commissioning titles. This financing structure later served to fund productions such as Little J & Big Cuz and Thalu. Funding support came from Screen Australia, Screen Queensland, and pre-sale to Disney.

In January 2017, Australian television network NITV commissioned Grace Beside Me, its first scripted local drama series. The series, aimed at 8–12 year olds, was described as a combination of 21st-century issues and the inclusion of Aboriginal culture, as the protagonist, Fuzzy Mac, learns to find her place in the two different worlds. The series takes the form of a fantasy drama. The initial series order was for 13 episodes, to be produced by Magpie Pictures, and to premiere on NITV. The series was announced in association with Screen Australias Indigenous Department, who stated their focus in creating Indigenous and culturally diverse content for young Australians. Production was revealed to be led by an all-female team of producers, including Aboriginal producers and screenwriters. The episodes were co-commissioned by the Australian Broadcasting Corporation to playout on ABC Me, with an additional presale license by pay-TV network Disney Channel for broadcast in Australia and New Zealand.

Production of the series was led by producers Lois Randall and Dena Curtis, but it was a highly collaborative project. Shari Sebbens participated in the first workshop for Grace Beside Me, and there was collaboration with traditional owners of Mununjali country, after the decision was taken to move the location of the story to Queensland. Writers representing Aboriginal, South Sea Islander, and Māori peoples were engaged.

Mary-Ellen Mullane served as the executive for NITV, and Libbie Doherty was appointed executive for the ABC.

=== Writing ===
Scripts for Grace Beside Me are written in the genre of magic realism, with the goal of depicting contemporary teenage life. Curtis and Randall appreciated McPherson's depiction of small regional communities, having both come from regional backgrounds themselves. The original novel was written for a teenager audience, but the story was reworked to target a younger 8–12 year old demographic for the television series. The writers and producers consulted with Aboriginal Healers, Australian South Sea Islanders and the Mununjali Aboriginal Elders Group from Beaudesert, Queensland throughout the writing process. The Mununjali language is used in the series, with episodes inspired by stories told by Mununjali Elders. Māori writer Briar Grace-Smith also contributed to the scripts, to add an authentic voice to Māori character Tui. Grace-Smith described the writing process as "snappy and fast-paced". Other writers for the series included Gina Roncoli, Danielle MacLean, Sue McPherson and Tristan Savage.

=== Filming ===
Production for Grace Beside Me began in July 2017, being filmed over eleven weeks in the Scenic Rim Region in South East Queensland. The series was filmed on the Traditional Lands of the Mununjali and Ugarapul People. The fictional town of Laurel Dale was created through the use of buildings and landmarks from Boonah and Beaudesert. Local townspeople were used as extras during filming, and the cast were invited to a welcoming ceremony held by Beaudesert Elders. The series was directed by Lynn-Maree Danzey, Nicholas Verso and Beck Cole. Kyliric Masella was announced to be playing Fuzzy Mac, with Mairehau Grac and Tjiirdm McGuire as supporting characters Tui and Yar respectively. Masella became close with her co-stars, who she shared a house with while filming. The cast were also required to complete school work during production.

The theme song, "Grace Beside Me", was composed by Amanda Brown and Emily Wurramara and performed by Wurramara.

The series premiered on NITV on 16 February 2018. It later premiered on ABC Me on 8 July 2018 and on Disney Channel on 5 March 2019.

== Episodes ==
No. overall	No. in series	Title	Directed by	Written by	Original release date
1	1	"Spooky Month"	Lynn-Maree Danzey	Gina Roncoli; Briar Grace-Smith	16 February 2018
Fuzzy Mac awakes on her thirteenth birthday to find a young spirit girl in her bedroom who she recognises from a dream. Her grandmother sets her a task while she prepares for Fuzzy's party; to return sacred souvenirs which have been stolen by tourists back to Lola's Forest. While returning the items, Fuzzy prevents her classmates from swimming in the waterhole; a sacred site guarded by her ancestor Lola. Fuzzy steals a thunder egg containing ancient frogs, which she returns to the forest once they are hatched. She establishes a connection with the young spirit, who is grateful for her assistance. Later, Nan tells Fuzzy that she has the gift of a seer and that the spirit she encountered was her great-great-grandmother, Lola, who chose to appear to her as a young girl. Nan gives Fuzzy a spirit stone, used for warding off spirits, to signal the beginning of her journey as a seer.
2	2	"Black Hat's Treasure"	Lynn-Maree Danzey	Danielle MacLean	23 February 2018
While Laurel Dale experiences a heatwave, Fuzzy, Tui and Yar attend their first day of high school. The friends discover that their old kindergarten building has been demolished, leading their teacher, Miss Long, to assign them the task of researching their own family history. Fuzzy sees the spirit of her ancestor, a bushranger called Black Hat; the father of Lola. The friends set out to find his buried treasure, which leads to a school-wide hunt on the grounds. Black Hat's spirit helps Fuzzy to find the treasure; an old pocket watch which she discovers is a priceless family heirloom. Nan tells Fuzzy that she shares the same totem as her late mother; the magpie. Meanwhile, Emmy learns about her Chinese heritage.
3	3	"Yarn for Yar"	Lynn-Maree Danzey	Sam Carroll; Sue McPherson	2 March 2018
Nan leads Fuzzy's class on an excursion to teach them about the tradition of water divining. When they arrive at their usual location, they discover that the site has been fenced off. Nan confronts Mayor Ridgeway, who tells her that the local land has been sold and access has been restricted. Yar suggests they yarn-bomb the padlocked gate in protest, but Fuzzy encourages him to tone down his eccentricities to avoid being bullied at school. Yar changes his appearance, which leads Fuzzy to feel distanced from him and Tui. This leads her to see the spirit of a boy named Bruce, who has been watching over Yar. He helps her to see the value of Yar's uniqueness, and she organises a yarn-bombing of the gate to apologise and show her support. Mayor Ridgeway sees the display and informs Nan that the private owners have decided to re-open their property to the public. Meanwhile, Cat and her father come to terms with their new financial situation after declaring bankruptcy.
4	4	"Sorry"	Nicholas Verso	Sue McPherson; Sam Carroll	9 March 2018
Nan prepares to commemorate Sorry Day and remembers how she and her sister Min were taken from her family when they were children, as part of the Stolen Generations. An impassioned debate with Cat about the significance of Sorry Day leads Fuzzy to impulsively decide to compete against her in the election for class president. After tensions escalate between the pair, Miss Long assigns Fuzzy the task of finding out what being "sorry" truly means. Fuzzy learns that Nan and Cat's grandmother Enid were childhood friends, and Nan was sent to work for Enid's family as a child. Nan tells Fuzzy that the pair were forced to keep their friendship secret and Enid was later punished for being friends with Nan because of her ethnicity. Fuzzy sees Enid's spirit, who is determined to make amends with Nan for not fighting for their friendship. After learning the truth about their families' connections, Cat and Fuzzy apologise and decide to run in the election together as co-presidents.
5	5	"Milka's Secret"	Beck Cole	Briar Grace-Smith	16 March 2018
Aunty Min and Esther temporarily move in with Nan and Pop after they encounter a broken water pipe at their home. Esther stays in Fuzzy's room and quickly becomes unsettled in the new environment. Esther's violin teacher, Mr. Steiner, detects that she is struggling with the change. He shows her an old doll called Milka that belonged to his late sister Rani, who died as a child during the war. Fuzzy sees Rani's spirit and, noticing that Rani is pleased to see her doll being played with, convinces Mr. Steiner to share his sister's tragic story. Fuzzy borrows the doll to help ease Esther's worries, but is alarmed when Milka goes missing overnight. Fuzzy finds the doll back at Mr. Steiner's house and learns of its great importance to him. Noticing the family tensions due to living in the cramped house, Mr. Steiner offers for Aunty Min and Esther to stay at his house temporarily so that Esther can be close to Milka.
6	6	"Hangi Sleepover"	Lynn-Maree Danzey	Briar Grace-Smith	23 March 2018
Fuzzy unwillingly rejects Tui's offer for a sleepover and hāngī feast at her house, while she is busy assisting Nan in hosting the Elders who are visiting. Fuzzy is upset that Nan is demanding her assistance a home, but Nan is insistent that she learn their customs and traditions. Fuzzy sneaks away to Tui's house for the hāngī, but notices that the young spirit of Lola has followed her. Lola indicates to Fuzzy that the rocks being used for the hāngī fire pit are sacred rocks from the forest, leading Fuzzy to collect and return them. She returns home with a new appreciation for Nan and their beliefs. Meanwhile, Tui escapes to Nan's house to seek solace from her visiting cousin Tama.
7	7	"Grace"	Nicholas Verso	Danielle MacLean	30 March 2018
A class excursion to Lola's Forest coincides with the anniversary of the death of Fuzzy's mother, Grace. Fuzzy learns that her mother died from a snakebite while searching for a remedy for Fuzzy's recurring rashes, and wonders why Grace's spirit hasn't appeared to her yet. Fuzzy is distracted and moves away from her classmates when she senses her mother nearby. The class searches for Fuzzy as she finally sees and talks to the spirit of her mother in the place where she died. After spending time with Grace, Fuzzy leads her lost classmates in navigating through Lola's Forest to return to the clearing. Meanwhile, Jesse befriends Teddy, a boy who has moved to Laurel Dale from the city following his parents' divorce. Guest star: Umema Curtis as Grace
8	8	"The Sweetest Gift"	Nicholas Verso	Sam Caroll	6 April 2018
When Fuzzy's bicycle breaks down, she decides to search for ways to earn the money to fund a replacement. After doing chores for Nan, Yar encourages Fuzzy to open a psychic tent and use her gift to offer readings. Fuzzy feels guilt for extorting her gift as a seer and lying to her customers, and notices Lola's disapproval when her spirit appears during the readings. After her fraudulent readings, Fuzzy fears that she has lost her gift for being disrespectful. She sets out to make amends with the spirits and is eventually forgiven by Lola. Meanwhile, Tui accompanies Jesse to his audition for the school musical, but nerves hinder his performance. Tui offers to sing with him to ease his nerves.
9	9	"Blackbird"	Nicholas Verso	David Hannam	13 April 2018
Fuzzy prepares to sing the song "Blackbird" with Pop for the annual Harmony Day cultural showcase, which will serve as a Welcome to Country. Fuzzy is confused when she learns that Pop does not know all of the histories of his South Sea Islander ancestors, and is concerned when she has a premonition that he is leaving for Vanuatu to search for answers and rejoin his relatives. Fuzzy lashes out at her family and friends in anger, which leaves her feeling isolated and unsure of her gift and its importance. Pop reveals that he isn't leaving, but has been working on a traditional drum carving as a tribute to the family he remembers. Meanwhile, Tui rehearses a Māori dance which she will perform for the showcase, but struggles to overcome the nerves of performing in front of an audience.
10	10	"Catch Your Death"	Beck Cole	Tristan Michael Savage	20 April 2018
On Halloween, Fuzzy follows a spirit dog which leads her to the spirit of Uncle Lefty, Pop's good friend who she discovers has died in prison. Uncle Lefty expresses his desire for a clean slate and assigns Fuzzy the task of returning all of the belongings that he stole to their rightful owners. Lefty haunts Fuzzy until she agrees to his request, leading her to recruit Tui and Yar to the task. Fuzzy is torn when she discovers that Lefty stole from Tui's grandmother, but is determined to find the necklace and return it. Tui is initially angered at Fuzzy's involvement with Uncle Lefty, but ultimately forgives her. Lefty leaves Pop his bravery medal from the war before departing. Guest star: Jack Charles as Uncle Lefty
11	11	"Love Me, Love Me Not"	Beck Cole	Giula Sandler	27 April 2018
Fuzzy's father Sonny visits from the mines for a parent-teacher conference with Miss Long. When Fuzzy's family teases Tui about her crush on Jesse, Aunty Min recommends using a love spell to ignite their feelings. Fuzzy notices a connection between her father and Miss Long, and casts the love spell to encourage a relationship between the pair. In the process, the magic accidentally strikes Tui and Yar, leading the friends to suddenly fall in love with each other as well. Fuzzy sets out to amend her mistake when she realises the implications of her father dating a teacher and her friends being in love. Jesse is saddened when he sees the chemistry between Tui and Yar, and breaks the spell out of anger. After the magic is reversed, Fuzzy asks her father to stay at home with her for a while longer. Guest star: Lasarus Ratuere as Sonny
12	12	"The Wishing Tree"	Beck Cole	Kodie Bedford	4 May 2018
Amidst collecting community donations for the annual Laurel Dale Wishing Tree, Fuzzy discovers that Cat and her father have moved to a small apartment due to their financial problems. Cat is ashamed of her new living conditions and turns her friends away from visiting, leaving Emmy feeling rejected. Fuzzy discovers the spirit of a grumpy teenager inside guarding Cat's room, and sets out to cleanse the house. However, the spirit is unwilling to leave and terrorises Fuzzy, Tui and Yar. The friends decide to decorate Cat's new room to help her settle in. But when the spirit trashes the decorations, Fuzzy is forced to reveals her secret to Cat and expose the ghost. Fuzzy realises the spirit girl, Hannah, has much in common with Cat, who offers to share her room instead of fighting. Nan helps Cat to see that there is no shame in accepting help during a rough period, and Cat makes up with Emmy.
13	13	"The Battle of Lola's Forest"	Beck Cole	Sam Carroll	11 May 2018
Fuzzy senses that Lola is in distress when she views the spirit as an older woman rather than a teenager. Fuzzy visits Lola's Forest and discovers that much of the vegetation is dying, the wildlife has fled, and that a dark cloud has made Lola weak. Fuzzy, Tui and Yar witness the entity overcome Lola, who leaves them with spirit stones. The friends try and overpower the spirit to drive it away, with Nan and Pop joining their plight. Fuzzy reconnects with her mother's spirit, who tells her that the black mass is stealing Lola's energy to take a human form. Fuzzy joins with her ancestors to fight the evil spirit, using the stones to vanquish the bad energy. Lola's spirit is returned to her younger form and the forest is restored to its original state. Lola grants Fuzzy the responsibility of becoming the new custodian of the forest. Meanwhile, Jesse learns that Teddy will be leaving Laurel Dale, and invites him to stay in his shed. Teddy's friends help him convince his father to stay in the town. Guest stars: Umema Curtis as Grace and Pauline Whyman as Old Lola

== Release and distribution ==
The series premiered on NITV on 16 February 2018 and later aired on ABC Me.

The series is distributed internationally by 9 Story Media Group.

== Reception ==
Grace Beside Me has received positive reviews based on its representation of Australian Aboriginal culture. Mandy Nolan of website Mamamia praised the Indigenous Australian cast, stating "I want my white child to hear black stories". She noted that the program's point of difference was that it didn't tell the stories of "white kids", like many other series. She also expressed her interest in viewing the program as a parent, along with her children. Reviewing the sixth episode "Hangi Sleepover", Melinda Houston commended the "deft" writing, and described the episode as "fresh, honest and funny".

== Awards and nominations ==
List of awards and nominations received by Grace Beside Me
Award	Year	Recipient(s) and nominee(s)	Category	Result	Ref.
AACTA Awards	2018	Grace Beside Me	Best Children's Program	Nominated	
APRA-AGSC Screen Music Awards	2018	Amanda Brown and Emily Wurramara (for "Grace Beside Me")	Best Original Song Composed for the Screen	Nominated	
ATOM Awards	2018	Grace Beside Me	Best Children's Television Program	Nominated	
Australian Directors' Guild Awards	2019	Nicholas Verso (for "Sorry")	Best Direction in a Children's TV or SVOD Drama Program	Won	
AWGIE Awards	2018	Giula Sandler (for "Love Me, Love Me Not")	Children's Television – C Classification (Children's 5–14 Years), Original or Adapted, Animated or Performed	Nominated	
Chicago International Children's Film Festival	2018	Grace Beside Me	Official Selection	Won	
First Nations Media Awards	2018	Grace Beside Me	Best Drama or Comedy	Won	
Logie Awards	2018	Grace Beside Me	Most Outstanding Children's Program (Note: Grace Beside Me was nominated for a Logie Award in both 2018 and 2019 despite having only aired for one series, due to the airing schedule being spread across the eligibility periods of both award years.)	Nominated	
Logie Awards	2019	Grace Beside Me	Most Outstanding Children's Program	Nominated	
Prix Jeunesse International Awards	2018	Grace Beside Me	TV – 7–10 Fiction (Children's)	Nominated	
Prix Jeunesse International Awards	2018	Grace Beside Me	UNESCO Special Prize	Nominated	
Screen Producers Australia Awards	2018	Grace Beside Me	Children's Series Production of the Year	Won	
