= Margaret Harvey (actress) =

Australian actress

- Occupation(s): Actor, Writer, Thinker, Director

Margaret Harvey is an Australian writer, director, thinker and performer. She is of Saibai Island blood and English heritage and is passionate in the reclamation of Indigenous narratives that support the continued survival, dignity and well-being of a people. For her performance in RAN Remote Area Nurse she was nominated for the 2006 Australian Film Institute Award for Best Guest or Supporting Actress in a Television Drama.

Harvey has a successful stage career, both as an actor and as a director. In 2005 she played Medea in Belvoir Street Theatre's Black Medea, Wesley Enoch's reworking of Medea. In 2022 she directed Who's Afraid of Virginia Woolf? for State Theatre Company South Australia, giving it a new subtext by "colour-conscious casting".
