= Roxanne McDonald =

Australian actress

Roxanne McDonald is an Indigenous Australian actress based in Queensland. She has worked mostly in the theatre, but her screen appearances include the film Australia Day, and on television in the series Harrow and 8MMM Aboriginal Radio.

== Early life ==
Roxanne McDonald is an Aboriginal Australian woman, of the Mandandanji, Wangan, and Darumbal peoples of Central Queensland, with Scottish heritage on both her maternal and paternal side. She grew up in a big family, with lots of close contact with extended family.

Her early years were spent around Roma, Queensland, until the family moved to Brisbane when she was seven years old.

== Career ==
=== Theatre ===
McDonald had no knowledge of theatre or acting until she was 24 years old, and had no formal training as an actor. While working in an administrative role, she noticed a flyer which was looking for actors to perform in a play which featured the poetry of Oodgeroo Noonuccal, and decided to audition. She has said that her acting work is informed by her Indigenous culture, including the history of Indigenous Australians as well as her own family history.

McDonald's first performance on stage was in 1984, with the Shoestring Theatre Company in a professional/amateur production of the musical The Best Little Whorehouse in Texas. Her next role was in Queensland Museum's production You Came To My Country and you didn't turn black in 1990, by which time she was 30 and passionate about the theatre.

In May 2021 she took the role of an 1840s Aboriginal Tasmanian in Dylan van den Berg's play Milk. In July of that year, she performed alongside Barbara Lowing in Rovers, a play which "celebrate(s) Australia's trailblazing women", written especially for the two actors by Katherine Lyall-Watson. Her performances span more than 50 mainstage plays, which have included productions by Kooemba Jdarra (Queensland's first Indigenous theatre company), Griffin Theatre, Belvoir Street Theatre, La Boite Theatre Company, and Queensland Theatre.

In July 2022, McDonald reprised her role as Aunty Faith in the Australian musical The Sunshine Club with Queensland Theatre at the Playhouse Theatre at QPAC, with one reviewer describing her performance as "the heart and soul of the show".

McDonald co-directed Don't Ask What the Bird Look Like, by Hannah Belanszky, at Queensland Theatre in September–October 2023.

=== Film and TV ===
On the screen, McDonald has starred in the films and Australia Day, and on television in the series Harrow, Grace Beside Me, and 8MMM Aboriginal Radio, and the telemovie Mabo.

== Other activities ==
McDonald had a brief break from her acting career when she became a guard at a Brisbane children's hospital.

As of 2021, McDonald was working with Wik people in Aurukun, Cape York, on a theatre project which was developed out of the Wik Kath Min Good Stories project from 2018, passing on her skills to the community to create their own theatre.

== Recognition and awards ==
In 2021, French artist Marco Eychenne (aka Photocrash), created a photographic/mixed media portrait of McDonald.

She has won several awards, including:

- 2000: Special commendation Matilda Award
- 2012: ACPA Aboriginal & Torres Strait Islander Career Achievement Award
- 2021: Alan Edwards Lifetime Achievement Award 2020, from the Actors' & Entertainers' Benevolent Fund

== Personal life ==
McDonald enjoys visiting Stradbroke Island, where she has relatives.
