= AACTA Award for Best Guest or Supporting Actress in a Television Drama =

Australian television award

- Country: Australia
- Presented by: Australian Academy of Cinema and Television Arts (AACTA)
- First award: 2000
- Currently held by: Mandy McElhinney, Howzat! Kerry Packer's War (2012)
- Website: http://www.aacta.org

The AACTA Award for Best Guest or Supporting Actress in a Television Drama, formerly known as the AFI Award for Best Guest or Supporting Actress in a Television Drama, is an accolade given by the Australian Academy of Cinema and Television Arts (AACTA), a non-profit organisation whose aim is to "identify, award, promote and celebrate Australia's greatest achievements in film and television." The award is handed out at the annual AACTA Awards, which rewards achievements in feature film, television, documentaries and short films.

From 2000 to 2010, the category was presented by the Australian Film Institute (AFI), the Academy's parent organisation, at the annual Australian Film Institute Awards (known as the AFI Awards). It was then known as the AFI Award for Best Guest or Supporting Actress in a Television Drama. When the AFI launched the Academy in 2011, it changed the annual ceremony to the AACTA Awards, with the current prize being a continuum of the AFI Award for Best Guest or Supporting Actress in a Television Drama.

The award was first presented in 2000 as Best Performance by an Actress in a Guest Role in a Television Drama Series until 2002, when the title was changed to Best Guest or Supporting Actress in a Television Drama. In the following year, the title was changed to Best Actress in a Supporting or Guest Role in a Television Drama or Comedy. By 2006, a separate comedy accolade was established, and the name changed to the current one.

The AACTA Award for Best Guest or Supporting Actress in a Television Drama is given for performances in television drama series, miniseries, telefeature, children's animation or children's drama series. Candidates for this award must be human and female, and cannot be nominated for best lead actress in a television drama in the same year, for the same production. Sacha Horler and Magda Szubanski have received two nominations each, more than any other actress in this category, with Szubanski winning one in 2000.

== Winners and nominees ==
In the following table, the years listed correspond to the year that the television programme aired on Australian television; the ceremonies are usually held the following year. The actress whose name is emphasised in boldface and highlighted in yellow have won the award. Those that are neither highlighted nor in bold are the nominees. When sorted chronologically, the table always lists the winning actress first and then the other nominees.

=== Best Performance by an Actress in a Guest Role in a Television Drama Series ===
Year	Actor	Program	Character(s)	Episode/Series	Network
**2000** (42nd)
**2000** (42nd)	**Lois Ramsey**	**Grass Roots**	**Mrs Robbins**	**Series 1, Episode 2: "Late September"**	**ABC**
**2000** (42nd)	Deborra-Lee Furness	SeaChange	Vicky Drury	Series 3, Episode 3: "Hungi Jury"	ABC
**2000** (42nd)	Natalia Novikova ^{[B]}	SeaChange	Francesca	Series 3, Episode 2: "How Much Greener Was My Neighbour's Valley"	ABC
**2001** (43rd)
**2001** (43rd)	**Catherine McClements**	**The Secret Life of Us**	**Carmen**	**Series 1, Episode 11: "Love Sucks"**	**Network Ten**
**2001** (43rd)	Carol Burns	Blue Heelers	Eunice Johnson	Series 8, Episode 3: "Deadly Fascination"	Seven Network
**2001** (43rd)	Rhondda Findleton	Stingers	Mia Endquist	Series 3, Episode 5: "Fool to Want You"	Nine Network
**2001** (43rd)	Joanne Priest	Love Is a Four Letter Word	Rachel Fox	Episode 13: "Split"	ABC

=== Best Actress in a Supporting or Guest Role in a Television Drama ===
Year	Actor	Program	Character(s)	Episode/Series	Network
**2002** (44th)
**2002** (44th)	**Magda Szubanski**	**Kath & Kim**	**Sharon Strzelecki**	**Series 1, Episode 8: "Wedding"**	**ABC**
**2002** (44th)	Rebecca Frith	Secret Bridesmaids' Business	Angela		ABC
**2002** (44th)	Sacha Horler	Secret Bridesmaids' Business	Lucy Dean		ABC
**2002** (44th)	Belinda McClory	All Saints	Nicola Lewis	Series 5, Episode 1: "Opening Night"	Seven Network

=== Best Actress in a Supporting or Guest Role in a Television Drama or Comedy ===
Year	Actor	Program	Character(s)	Episode/Series	Network
**2003** (45th)
**2003** (45th)	**Essie Davis**	**After the Deluge**	**Beth**		**Network Ten**
**2003** (45th)	Maggie Dence	Always Greener	Sister Stern	Series 2, Episode 9: "Understanding the Cry"	Seven Network
**2003** (45th)	Sacha Horler	Grass Roots	Helen Manoufis	Series 2, Episode 1: "Art"	ABC
**2003** (45th)	Magda Szubanski	Kath & Kim	Sharon Strzelecki	Series 2	ABC
**2004** (46th)
**2004** (46th)	**Katie Wall**	**Marking Time**	**Belinda**		**ABC**
**2004** (46th)	Abbie Cornish	Marking Time	Tracey		ABC
**2004** (46th)	Jacinta Stapleton	Stingers	Christina Dicheria	Series 8, Episode 8: "Break and Enter"	ABC
**2004** (46th)	Magda Szubanski	Kath & Kim	Sharon Strzelecki	Series 3	ABC

=== Best Guest or Supporting Actress in Television Drama ===
Year	Actor	Program	Character(s)	Episode/Series	Network
**2005** (47th)
**2005** (47th)	**Anita Hegh**	**MDA**	**Dr. Julia Delvecchio**	**Series 3, Episode 6: "Departure Lounge (Part 2)"**	**ABC**
**2005** (47th)	Alyssa McClelland	Small Claims	Kiara Duffy	Episode 2: "White Wedding"	Network Ten
**2005** (47th)	Alice McConnell	The Incredible Journey of Mary Bryant	Elizabeth		Network Ten
**2005** (47th)	Angie Milliken	Through My Eyes	Joy Kuhl		Seven Network
**2006** (48th)
**2006** (48th)	**Saskia Burmeister**	**Blue Heelers**	**Ashley Barker**	**Series 13**	**Seven Network**
**2006** (48th)	Emily Barclay	The Silence	Evelyn Hutchison		ABC
**2006** (48th)	Margaret Harvey	RAN: Remote Area Nurse	Nancy Gaibui		SBS
**2006** (48th)	Merwez Whaleboat	RAN: Remote Area Nurse	Bernadette Gaibui		SBS
**2007** (49th)
**2007** (49th)	**Vicki Saylor**	**Call Me Mum**	**Flo**		**SBS**
**2007** (49th)	Justine Clarke	Love My Way	Simone		Showtime
**2007** (49th)	Lynette Curran	Call Me Mum	Dellamy		SBS
**2007** (49th)	Monica Maughan	The King	Nana Scott		TV1
**2008** (50th)
**2008** (50th)	**Madeleine West**	**Underbelly**	**Danielle McGuire**	**Episode 7: "Wise Monkeys"**	**Nine Network**
**2008** (50th)	Brittany Byrnes	H_{2}O: Just Add Water	Charlotte Watsford	Series 2, Episode 25: "Sea Change"	Network Ten
**2008** (50th)	Hanna Mangan-Lawrence	Bed of Roses	Holly Atherton	Series 1, Episode 1: "Not Worth a Cent"	ABC1
**2008** (50th)	Amanda Muggleton	City Homicide	Cathy Booth	Series 1, Episode 3: "Lie Down With Dogs"	Seven Network
**2009** (51st)
**2009** (51st)	**Anni Finsterer**	**3 Acts of Murder**	**Anne Upfield**		**ABC1**
**2009** (51st)	Kathryn Beck	Scorched	Emily Francia		Nine Network
**2009** (51st)	Claire Forlani	False Witness	Pippa Porter		UKTV
**2009** (51st)	Kate Ritchie	Underbelly: A Tale of Two Cities	Judi Kane	Episode 4: "Business As Usual"	Nine Network
**2010** (52nd)
**2010** (52nd)	**Deborah Mailman**	**Offspring**	**Cherie Butterfield**	**Series 1**	**Network Ten**
**2010** (52nd)	Linda Cropper	Satisfaction	Loretta Hawkes	Series 3, Episode 8: "Not Vanilla"	Showcase
**2010** (52nd)	Sacha Horler	Hawke	Jean Sinclair		Network Ten
**2010** (52nd)	Asher Keddie	Hawke	Blanche d'Alpuget		Network Ten
**AACTA Awards**
**2011** (1st)
**2011** (1st)	**Diana Glenn**	**The Slap**	**Sandi**	**Episode 3: "Harry"**	**ABC1**
**2011** (1st)	Rena Owen	East West 101	Mere Hahunga	Season 3, Episode 5: "The Price of Salvation"	SBS One
**2011** (1st)	Susie Porter	Sisters of War	Kay Parker		ABC1
**2011** (1st)	Lara Robinson	Cloudstreet	Young Rosie Pickles	"Part 1"	Showcase
**2012** (2nd)
**2012** (2nd)	**Mandy McElhinney**	**Howzat! Kerry Packer's War**	**Rose Mitchell**	**"Part 2"**	**Nine Network**
**2012** (2nd)	Shareena Clanton	Redfern Now	Lilly	Season 1, Episode 1: "Family"	ABC1
**2012** (2nd)	Susan Prior	Puberty Blues	Yvonne Hennessey	Season 1, "Episode 4"	Network Ten
**2012** (2nd)	Laura Wheelwright	Underground: The Julian Assange Story	Electra		Network Ten
**2013** (3rd)
**2013** (3rd)	**Kat Stewart**	**Offspring**	**Billie Proudman**	**Series 4: "Episode 1"**	**Network Ten**
**2013** (3rd)	Kris McQuade	Wentworth	Jacs Holt	Series 1, Episode 10: "Checkmate"	SoHo
**2013** (3rd)	Heather Mitchell	Power Games: The Packer-Murdoch War	Gretel Packer	"Part 1"	Nine Network
**2013** (3rd)	Robyn Nevin	Top of the Lake	Jude	Episode 4: "A Rainbow Above Us"	UKTV
**2014** (4th)
**2014** (4th)	**Chelsie Preston-Crayford**	**The Code**		**Episode 1**	**ABC**
**2014** (4th)	Charlotte Best	Puberty Blues		Season 2, Episode 8	Network Ten
**2014** (4th)	Piper Morrissey	Secrets & Lies		Episode 6	Network Ten
**2014** (4th)	Denise Roberts	Schapelle			Nine Network
**2015** (5th)
**2015** (5th)	**Sigrid Thornton**	**Peter Allen: Not the Boy Next Door**	**Judy Garland**	**Episode 1**	**Seven Network**
**2015** (5th)	Harriet Dyer	Love Child		Season 2, Episode 3	Nine Network
**2015** (5th)	Rarriwuy Hick	Redfern Now			ABC
**2015** (5th)	Hannah Monson	Glitch	Kirsten "Kirstie" Darrow	Episode 4	ABC
**2016** (6th)
**2016** (6th)	**Celia Pacquola**	**The Beautiful Lie**		**Episode 3**	**ABC**
**2016** (6th)	Caroline Brazier	Rake		Episode 8	ABC
**2016** (6th)	Sacha Horler	The Kettering Incident		Episode 3	Foxtel/Showcase
**2016** (6th)	Sianoa Smit-McPhee	The Kettering Incident		Episode 1	Foxtel/Showcase
**2017** (7th)
**2017** (7th)	**Nicole Kidman**	**Top of the Lake: China Girl**			**Foxtel/BBC First**
**2017** (7th)	Emma Booth	Blue Murder: Killer Cop			Seven Network
**2017** (7th)	Tina Bursill	Doctor Doctor			Nine Network
**2017** (7th)	Andrea Demetriades	Seven Types of Ambiguity			ABC
**2018** (8th)
**2018** (8th)	**Deborah Mailman**	**Mystery Road**			
**2018** (8th)	Caroline Brazier	Rake			
**2018** (8th)	Nicole Chamoun	Safe Harbour			
**2018** (8th)	Celia Ireland	Wentworth			
**2018** (8th)	Tasma Walton	Mystery Road			
**2019** (9th)
**2019** (9th)	**Rachel Griffiths**	**Total Control**	Rachel Anderson		
**2019** (9th)	Kate Box	Les Norton	Lauren 'Lozza' Johnson		
**2019** (9th)	Asher Keddie	The Cry	Alexandra		
**2019** (9th)	Brooke Satchwell	Mr Inbetween	Ally		
**2019** (9th)	Jacki Weaver	Bloom	Gwendolyn "Gwen" Reed		
**2020** (10th)
**2020** (10th)	**Cate Blanchett**	**Stateless**			
**2020** (10th)	Jacqueline McKenzie	Bloom			
**2020** (10th)	Ngaire Pigram	Mystery Road			
**2020** (10th)	Tasma Walton	Mystery Road			
**2020** (10th)	Jacki Weaver	Bloom	Gwendolyn "Gwen" Reed		
**2021** (11th)
**2021** (11th)	**Rachel Griffiths**	**Total Control**	Rachel Anderson		
**2021** (11th)	Michelle Lim Davidson	The Newsreader			
**2021** (11th)	Marg Downey	The Newsreader			
**2021** (11th)	Harriet Dyer	Wakefield			
**2021** (11th)	Noni Hazlehurst	The End			
**2022** (12th)
**2022** (12th)	**Brooke Satchwell**	**The Twelve**			
**2022** (12th)	Hayley McElhinney	Mystery Road: Origin			
**2022** (12th)	Jacqueline McKenzie	Savage River			
**2022** (12th)	Heather Mitchell	Love Me			
**2022** (12th)	Magda Szubanski	After the Verdict			

== See also ==
- AACTA Award for Best Guest or Supporting Actor in a Television Drama
- AACTA Awards

== Notes ==
B: Natalia Novikova is currently known as Natasha Novak, but was credited under the aforementioned name in SeaChange.
