= Warm Props =

2025 Australian miniseries

Warm Props is an Australian television drama miniseries for SBS and NITV which released on 26 June 2025. Produced by Ramu Productions and directed by Jub Clerc, the series focuses on Charlie who returns home to Broome, Western Australia, as she runs into someone she vowed to never see again. It stars Rarriwuy Hick as Aunty Jilby, while Tehya Makani plays Charlie.

== Plot ==
Charlie returns home to Broome and runs into someone from her past while she is in the middle of a chaotic film shoot, and it threatens her career and her relationships with those on set.

== Cast ==
- Tehya Makani as Charlie
- Rarriwuy Hick as Aunty Jilby
- Jillian Nguyen as Beth

== Production ==
In 2023, the series was one of 20 projects that had received further development funding from Screen Australia. On 9 July 2024, the series was announced alongside two other projects, Moni and Moonbird.

The series was created by Jub Clerc and co-written and co-directed by Clerc and Kimberly Benjamin. Production was by Jodie Bell for Ramu Productions. Apart from Screen Australia, funding support was also provided by Screenwest. On 10 July 2024 the series wrapped filming on location in Western Australia.

On 22 May 2025 SBS announced their lineup for their digital originals, with Warm Props being announced for 19 June 2025.

== Release ==
Warm Props premiered on NITV on 26 June 2025 at 8:30pm.
