= Rarriwuy Hick =

Australian actress

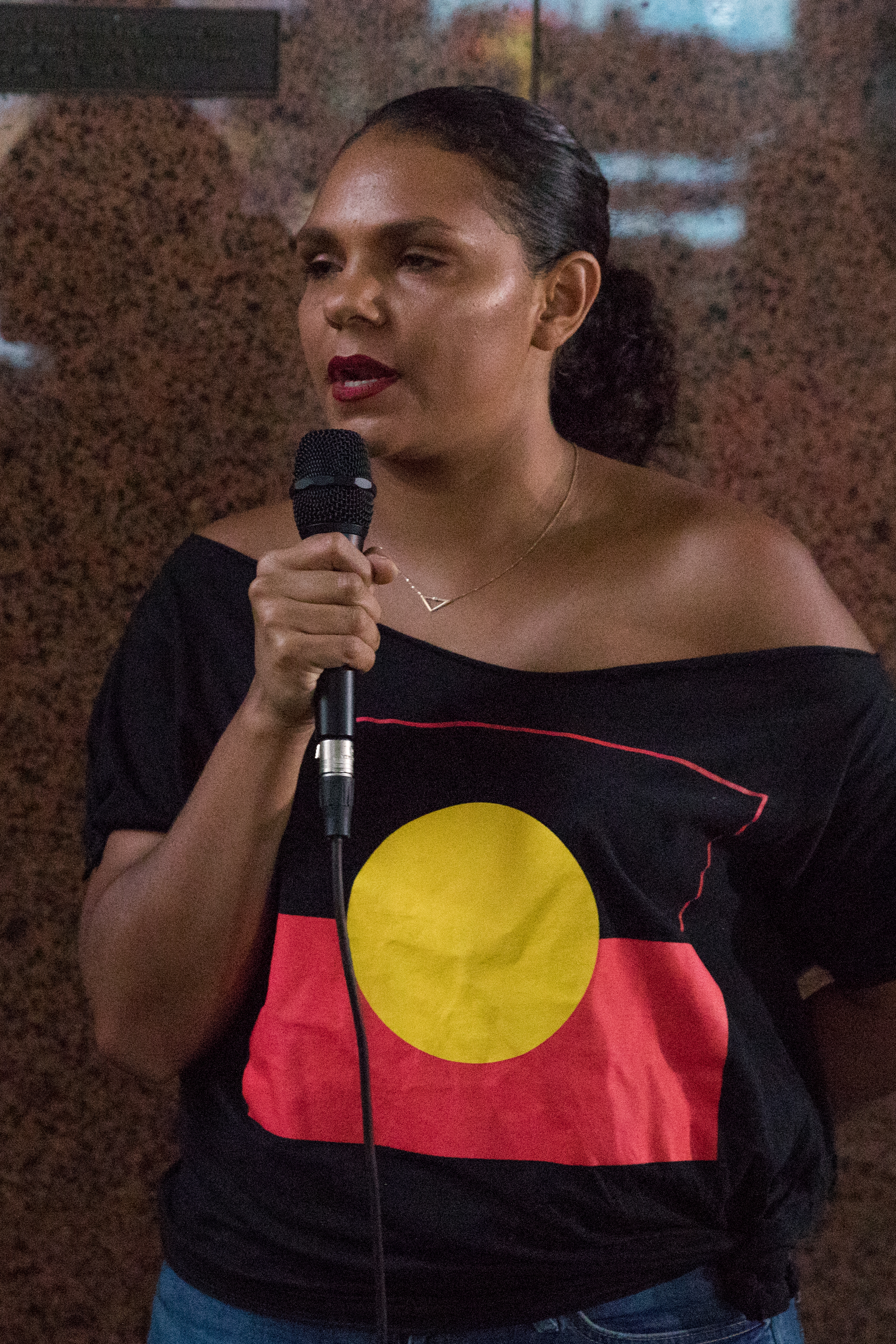
- Hick in 2018
- Born: 1990 or 1991; Sydney, New South Wales, Australia
- Occupations: Actress, dancer, director
- Years active: 2012-present
- Known for: Redfern Now; Wentworth; True Colours

Rarriwuy Hick (born 1990 or 1991) is an Aboriginal Australian award-winning actress, known for her roles in the television series Redfern Now, Cleverman, Wentworth and True Colours.

== Early life and education ==
Hick was born around 1991 in Sydney, Australia. She grew up in both the suburb of Lilyfield, and in Dhalinybuy, an Aboriginal community in Arnhem Land, Northern Territory. She was raised speaking Yolŋu Matha and other Aboriginal Australian languages before learning English, and speaks seven dialects. Her mother, Janet Munyarryun, a Yolngu woman, was a founding member of Bangarra Dance Theatre.

Throughout her education, Hick was inspired by her mother to pursue dance and the arts. She attended a Catholic girls high school and showed sufficient interest in dance to establish a troupe. In 2009, she commenced studies at the National Aboriginal and Islander Skills Development Association (NAISDA) Dance College,. She was asked to audition for the Aboriginal-produced play Wrong Skin, and was successful, performing on the tour while studying.

== Career ==
=== Acting ===
Hick starred in two episodes of the television series Redfern Now (2012–2013), and as ongoing character of Ruby Mitchell in Wentworth making her first appearance for season 6, Hick would reprise the role of Ruby Mitchell when the show was renewed for its eighth and final season.

In 2022 she played the lead role as detective Toni Alma, returning to her home town in Central Australia after living most of her life away from it, in the television miniseries True Colours. One reviewer called her performance "career-best".

In 2023, Hick appeared in Home and Away in the role of Elandra Hudson. Hick also appeared in SBS drama Erotic Stories.

In 2024, Hick was named as part of the cast for upcoming feature film Kangaroo. On 21 November 2024, Hick was named as part of the cast for the second season of the ABC drama Mystery Road: Origin. On 26 October 2026, Hick was announced as lead of the film Language of Birds.

=== Dance and theatre ===
She established the dance group Yapa Mala and led its choreography. In 2011, she starred in the theatre play Bloodland.

In 2016, Hick starred in a revival of the Louis Nowra play The Golden Age by the Sydney Theatre Company and her performance and dance received praise.

== Other activities ==
Hick was living in Arnhem Land at the time of the 2007 Northern Territory National Emergency Response. She later remarked that the intervention was not having an effect on child abuse like intended and instead that her family's lives and finances were being "completely controlled by the government".

In May 2013, Hick and other actors from theatre production The Shadow King in Melbourne were refused taxi rides by several drivers who reportedly drove off after observing that the group members were of Indigenous appearance.

In 2018, Hick started a social media campaign using the hashtag #ourkidsbelongwithfamilies, which became a "rallying cry" of Indigenous Australians fighting to maintain their families together against removals and resettlement of children by authorities.

== Filmography ==
=== Film ===
Year	Title	Role	Notes	Ref
2012	She Say		Short film	
2012	Scar		Short film	
2013	The Hunter		Short film	
2014	One Short Day	Woman	Short film	
2015	Wurinyan		Short film	
2022	Seriously Red	Nurse	Directed by Gracie Otto	
2024	Bear	Charlene		
2025	Kangaroo	Brenda	Feature film	
TBA	Language of Birds	May	Feature	

=== Television ===
Year	Title	Role	Notes	Ref
2012	Move It Mob Style	Herself	Episode 4	
2012–2013	Redfern Now	Robyn Davis	2 episodes	
2013	The Broken Shore	Suzie Pascoe	TV movie	
2013	The Outlaw Michael Howe	Mary	TV movie	
2014	The Gods of Wheat Street	Electra Freeburn	6 episodes	
2015	Redfern Now: Promise Me	Robyn Davis	TV movie	
2016–2017	Cleverman	Latani	12 episodes	
2018–2021	Wentworth	Ruby Mitchell	Seasons 6–8, 42 episodes (main role)	
2018	Black Comedy	Various characters	6 episodes	
2019	Molly and Cara	Cara	TV series	
2021	Wentworth Unlocked	Self	TV special	
2022	True Colours	Detective Toni Alma	Miniseries, 4 episodes	
2022	Significant Others	Deb Munroe	5 episodes	
2022	Darby and Joan	Tegan	1 episode	
2023–2024	Home and Away	Elandra Hudson	8 episodes	
2024	Erotic Stories	Kiarra	Episode: "Powerful Owl"	
2025	Warm Props	Aunty Jilby	TV series	
2025	Mystery Road: Origin	Jesse Roman	TV series	

== Theatre ==
Year	Production	Role	Notes
2010	Wrong Skin	Ngurrumilmaramiriwu	
2012	Bloodland		
2013	The Shadow King	Cordelia	
2014	Brothers Wreck	Adele	
2016	The Golden Age	Betsheb	

== Awards and nominations ==
Year	Award	Category	Film	Result	Ref.
2011	Deadly Awards	Female Actor of the Year	Wrong Skin	Nominated	
2012	Deadly Awards	Female Actor of the Year	Bloodland	Nominated	
2015	AACTA Awards	Best Guest or Supporting Actress in a Television Drama	Redfern Now	Nominated	
2016	Logie Awards	Most Outstanding Supporting Actress	Redfern Now: Promise Me	Nominated	
2016	Equity Ensemble Awards	Most Outstanding Performance by an Ensemble in a TV Movie or Miniseries	The Outlaw Michael Howe	Nominated	
2022	Asian Academy Creative Award	Best Actress in a Leading Role	True Colours	Won	
