= Pearly Black =

Australian singer

- Pearly Black in 2001

Background information
- Born: February 1967 (age 59)
- Origin: Brisbane, Queensland, Australia
- Genres: Cabaret; Rock; Folk-noir; Acoustic prog-rock Flamenco; Latin; Bulgarian folklorica Gospel; Disco
- Occupation: Singer
- Instruments: Vocals, guitar
- Years active: 1989–present
- Website: blackcherry.com.au

Pearly Black (born February 1967) is an Australian singer. Her performance style varies widely, performing with several ensembles in different genres and in short-run shows. She is perhaps best known for collaborations with avant-garde composer and musician John Rodgers, including their "sex-and-death-cabaret-rock" band Madam Bones Brothel which developed a cult following in Brisbane and Melbourne.

== Career ==
Pearly began singing in Brisbane in the late 1980s where she met John Rodgers (sometimes known as John Bone) and created Madam Bones Brothel.

She moved to Melbourne in 1992 and worked extensively over the next 10 years in many diverse settings. Her musical ensembles included Madam Bones Brothel, acoustic prog-rock duo Diastima, Robin Casinader's folk-noir ensemble Hood, stadium-disco band Butt Funky, Latin/cabaret quartet Las Tangolitas alongside solo performances as a singer-songwriter.

During her time in Melbourne, Pearly also sang with Petrunka (the Melbourne Women's Bulgarian Choir) and performed as a local cast member for dance troupe Stomp.

In 1996, Pearly had a minor role in the film Love and Other Catastrophes as "Woman in Bathroom Making Love".

In 2003, Pearly lived in Hobart and studied at the Tasmanian Conservatorium with Maria Lurighi. She was also a member of the Southern Gospel Choir.

She returned to Brisbane in 2004 and once again began collaborating with John Rodgers. She has performed with John and other musicians in many and varied circumstances including in the gospel revue Tell Heaven, in the transcendental cabaret The Ultimate Prize – A John Rodgers Retrospective, and with The God Botherers (the precursor to Tell Heaven).

She was a member of the cast in 2004 for Women in Voice, Brisbane's annual singing showcase, alongside Chrissy Amphlett and Kate Miller-Heidke. Her performance was described as having a smoldering moodiness.

She has twice performed in shows with music composed by John in Mount Isa to audiences of thousands of people for the Queensland Music Festival – Bobcat Dancing in 2003 and Bobcat Magic! in 2005. She performed lead vocals in a 2007 show for the Queensland Music Festival The Dream Catchers, also written by John Rodgers, held in Innisfail.

In 2006, Pearly was a member of the cast for Tom Waits For No Man, a cabaret show featuring the music of Tom Waits, performed at the Brisbane Cabaret Festival. The show returned for the 2007 season of the Festival by popular demand where it won a Matilda Award (Queensland's annual theatre industry awards) for the Best Musical Production.

She continues to perform regularly in Brisbane and Melbourne. She also offers singing tuition in styles ranging "from jazz to heavy metal".

== Partnership with John Rodgers ==
John Rodgers is a composer, improviser, violinist, pianist, and guitarist. At a young age he was heavily involved in classical music with orchestras, touring Europe and Asia, often appearing as a soloist.

John decided not to follow a career in the classical field. Rodgers and Pearly's band, Madam Bones Brothel was formed with the intention of rejecting all things represented in the world of classical music. As a composer, John is highly regarded for his creative genius and a vast amount of this music has been written for Pearly to perform. The material in Madam Bones Brothel ranged from funk to rap, jazz to rock, country to flamenco, often in the same set.

Madam Bones Brothel has not performed since 2000 but John and Pearly continue to play music together. John plays with Pearly in the gospel group Tell Heaven and they also play as a duo for special events (sometimes performing Madam Bones Brothel songs). John played in the Women in Voice band in 2004 when Pearly was a featured star and one of the songs she performed was The Ultimate Prize, a song previously recorded by The Brothel. In recent years, John has received several major grants to compose music for large shows and Pearly has often been included in the cast. Pearly sings the lead vocals in John's most recent large-scale musical theatre piece, The Dream Catchers.

== Recordings ==
=== With Madam Bones Brothel ===
- Family of Abjects (1994)

7 tracks, album

- Fleas on the Bitch (2000)

8 tracks, album

=== With Diastima ===
- Where Were You When I Needed You? (1999)

8 tracks, limited-release album

=== With Hood / Robin Casinader ===
- Are You Wearing Despair? (not yet released)

9 tracks, album

- Useful Tunes (2005)

11 tracks, album

=== With Tell Heaven ===
- Live at the Judy (2006)

8 tracks, promotional EP

- White Stone Chapel (2009)

Live concert DVD

=== With Las Tangolitas ===
- Lush Latin Cabaret (undated)

7 tracks, promotional EP

=== Compilation and guest appearances ===
- Sweet Young Corn (1998) by Sweet Young Corn

Track: Temptation, composed by Tom Waits
Track: Cancion Mixteca, composed by Ry Cooder

- Andrew Entsch Tribute Live at the Empress (1999)

Track: Queen of Hearts, with Hood

- Deeper Shades (2004) by Bat

Track: The Place of the Stars

- Bobcat Magic! (2005)

Track: When They Shine
Track: A Weird Kind O' Strange
Track: If You Happen To Be There, with Sven Swenson

- The Minotaur's Lament (2006) by Dark Waters Tango

Track: Desire
Track: Poison Tango
