= Call Me Mum =

2006 film

- Directed by: Margot Nash
- Written by: Kathleen Mary Fallon
- Produced by: Michael McMahon
- Starring: Catherine McClements; Vicki Saylor; Lynette Curran; Dayne Christian; Ross Thompson
- Cinematography: Andrew de Groot
- Edited by: Denise Haratzis
- Music by: David Bridie
- Release date: 2006 (Sydney Film Festival)
- Running time: 76 minutes
- Country: Australia
- Language: English

Call Me Mum is a 2006 Australian TV movie directed by Margot Nash.

== Plot ==
Kate is taking her foster son Warren to meet his birth mother Flo.

== Cast ==
- Catherine McClements as Kate
- Vicki Saylor as Flo
- Lynette Curran as Dellmay
- Dayne Christian as Warren
- Ross Thompson as Keith

== Awards ==
- AFI Awards
  - Outstanding Achievement in Television Screen Craft (production design) - Paddy Reardon - Won (also for Bastard Boys and The King)
  - Best Guest or Supporting Actress in Television Drama - Vicki Saylor - Won
  - Best Guest or Supporting Actress in Television Drama - Vicki Saylor - Lynette Curran - Nominated
  - Best Lead Actress in Television Drama - Catherine McClements - Nominated

== Reception ==
Keith Gallasch of Realtime calls the movie "a finely crafted and disturbing venture into the politics of race and the possibilities of filmmaking."
