= John Rodgers (musician) =

Australian musician

John Rodgers (November 20 1962 –21 December 2024) was a Brisbane-based Australian composer, improviser, violinist, pianist and guitarist.

== Early life ==
Rodgers was born in Millmerran, North Queensland and spent his early years there.

== Education ==
Rodgers was awarded the 1983 Vada Jefferies Prize Griffith University Queensland Conservatorium of Music. He graduated with a Bachelor of Music from the Queensland Conservatorium of Music in 1984.

== Career ==
Rodgers had an early background in classical music. He played with the Australian Youth Orchestra in 1980 -1982 (Violin 1) and in 1983-1984 (Violin) was leader. During this time they performed in Adelaide, Melbourne, Sydney, Perth and in 1984 undertook a tour of European Festivals.

He played with the Queensland Theatre Orchestra, and the Hunter Orchestra. With these and other orchestras, he toured Europe and Asia, often appearing as a soloist on violin.

Rodgers chose not to follow the path that led to a career in classical music, instead forming controversial sex-and-death cult rock band Madam Bones Brothel with Pearly Black and together they released a CD Family of Abjects in 1994.

He later played improvised music in ensembles such as The John Rodgers Trio and Artisan's Workshop early 1990s.

Rodgers has been a contributor to the Australian Art Orchestra and was its Associate Artistic Director in 2005. He has worked with the New York performance artist Penny Arcade (Vienna Festival 1997), the Robyn Archer band and many of Australia's leading musicians and artists. He has performed solo concerts in the Adelaide Festival and the Melbourne Summer Music Festival.

Rodgers has produced many works in fields including music theatre and new media.

He has performed and recorded with the Antripodean Collective over a number of years. In 2011 John Shand in the Sydney Morning Herald said of the collective, "[it] stands in the forefront of the world's improvisers ... shared harmonic and rhythmic conceptions and vocabularies ... For the listener, the upshot is moments of stunning confluence materialising from nowhere and an intriguing dichotomy between the intellectual and the aesthetic, the conceptual and the visceral."

In 2012 he performed at the Powerhouse in Dangling my Tootsies a show featuring the "songs and sites of cabaret legend Agnes Bernelle",

He has performed with number of artists both on recordings and live including William Barton on Birdsong at Dusk CD) , Kate Miller-Heidke at the Powerhouse and Resonance Festival (2012) where he composed and performed Hear me, and Remember.

From 2012 to 2014 he was with Metro Arts Work in Residence Programme where he composed, Madame Carandini’s Travelling Musical Curiosity Show, described as "a gothic new music theatre work".

== Reviews ==
In a series of three concerts, Life and Music (2013) at the University of Queensland, Rodger was described as, " prolific and eclectic composer, arranger and improviser ... His work has spanned classical, jazz, pop, world, experimental and improvisational music"

Rodgers was the musical director for QTC production Elizabeth, almost by chance a woman where Flloyd Kennedy's review said, "John Rodgers provides a witty, eclectic mixture of musical motifs from Renaissance tunes to modern pop."

== Creative output ==
Works composed by Rodgers include:

- Carolling (1998) for Perihelion
- Viv's Bum Dance (1998) for Topology
- The Sunshine Club (1999) with Wesley Enoch for the Queensland Theatre Company
- Moras for the Australian Art Orchestra and the Sruthi Laya ensemble
- Places in Hell (2000) for ELISION Ensemble
- Inferno (2000) for ELISION Ensemble and Adelaide Festival and Brisbane Festival
- The Garden of Deep Despair (2001) for the Australian Chamber Orchestra and the Gondwana Voices
- Violinist Extraordinaire John Rodgers (2001)
- The Mizler Society (2002) with Anthony Burr for Australian Arts Orchestra
- Bobcat Dancing (2003) for Queensland Biennial Festival of Music
- Ratbags (2004) for The Arterial Group and Opera Queensland
- The Ultimate Prize: a John Rodgers Retrospective (2004) for Brisbane Cabaret Festival
- TULP: The Body Public with Justine Cooper for ELISION Ensemble at the Sydney and Brisbane Festivals
- Bobcat Magic! (2005) for Queensland Music Festival
- Exit the King (2007) for Belvoir Theatre
- Weavers of Fiction (2008) artist Genevieve Lacey co-composer, works for recorder
- The Pink Twins (2009) QPAC and Brisbane Music Festival
- Where the Heart Is (2010) Expressions Dance Company
- Glass (2010) for Scott Tinkler with London Sinfonietta, Adelaide International Festival
- Little Birung (2012) stage performance with Megan Sarmardin

== CD Releases ==
CDs released by Rodgers alone and with others

Family of Abjects (1994) with Pearly Black

The Dream Catchers (2007)

A Rose is a Rose (2007) All tracks bar 3,5,7 composed by John Rodgers. Funding by the Australia Council.

Funcall (2008) by the Antripodean Collective

The Massacre of the Egos (2008) by the Antripodean Collective

NTRPDN (2010) by the Antripodean Collective

The Uncaring Wind (2010)

Past on my Sleeve (2011)
