= Subdivision (film) =

- Directed by: Sue Brooks
- Written by: Ashley Bradnam; Janice Bradnam; Terry McCann
- Produced by: Richard S. Guardian; Terry McCann
- Starring: Gary Sweet; Brooke Satchwell; Bruce Spence; Kris McQuade; Ashley Bradnam; Aaron Fa'aoso
- Production companies: Australian Film Finance Corporation; Cane Toad Productions; Freshwater Pictures; Pacific Film & Television Commission; Screen Australia
- Distributed by: Buena Vista International
- Release date: 20 August 2009
- Country: Australia
- Language: English

Subdivision is a 2009 Australian film directed by Sue Brooks and starring Gary Sweet, Brooke Satchwell, Bruce Spence, Kris McQuade, Ashley Bradnam, Aaron Fa'aoso. It was filmed in Hervey Bay, Queensland. It was released on 20 August 2009 throughout Australia.

Subdivision was distributed in Australia and New Zealand by Walt Disney Studios Motion Pictures under the Buena Vista International label with Lightning Entertainment handling the international distribution.

== Plot ==
Subdivision is a comedy/drama which focuses on the change a community goes through when city developers take over. The plot centres around Digger Kelly and his son Jack, both carpenters who build homes in Hervey Bay. Their world is turned upside down when a southern property developer led by hot young executive Tiffany moves into town.

== Cast ==
- Ashley Bradnam .... Jack Kelly
- Brooke Satchwell .... Tiffany
- Gary Sweet .... Digger Kelly
- Aaron Fa'aoso .... Solly
- Bruce Spence .... Singlet
- Denise Roberts .... Faye
- Kris McQuade .... Betty Kelly
- Steve Bisley .... Harry
- James Stewart .... Brett
- Kathryn Beck .... Dale Kelly
- John Batchelor .... Pete
- Petta Robertson .... Sue
- Luke Carroll

== Box office ==
Subdivision grossed $206,350 at the box office in Australia.

== See also ==
- Cinema of Australia
