= We Are Still Here (2022 film) =

2022 Australian-New Zealand anthology film

- Film poster
- Directed by: Beck Cole, Dena Curtis, Tracey Rigney, Danielle MacLean, Tim Worrall, Renae Maihi, Miki Magasiva, Mario Gaoa, Richard Curtis, Chantelle Burgoyne
- Written by: Beck Cole, Samuel Paynter, Tiraroa Reweti, Dena Curtis, Tracey Rigney, Danielle MacLean, Tim Worrall, Renae Maihi, Miki Magasiva, Mario Gaoa, Richard Curtis, Chantelle Burgoyne
- Produced by: Mia Henry-Teirney; Mitchell Stanley; Toni Stowers
- Cinematography: Raymond Edwards; Eric Murray Lui
- Edited by: Roland Gallois
- Music by: Mahuia Bridgman-Cooper
- Production companies: No Coincidence Media; Marama Productions
- Distributed by: Dark Matter; Rialto Entertainment
- Release date: 8 June 2022 (Sydney)
- Running time: 82 minutes
- Countries: Australia; New Zealand
- Languages: English; Māori; Samoan

We Are Still Here is an Australian-New Zealand anthology film released in 2022. It includes eight strands by ten directors, and centres on stories relating to the indigenous peoples of both countries and how they have been impacted and continue to be affected by colonisation.

== Synopsis ==
Created as a response to the 250th anniversary of the second voyage of James Cook to Australia in 1772, the project consists of ten linked short films by each of ten Indigenous Australian and Māori filmmakers about the impact of settler colonialism on the region's indigenous cultures.

The film alternates between different stories centering on Indigenous Australians and New Zealanders (Māori people) in the past, present, and future. There are eight strands by ten directors.

Two fisherwomen are attacked by British colonial slavetrader ships and experience a surreal, psychedelic tug-of-war between tradition and modernity.

An Indigenous man agrees to help a white settler find his family, only to find his own family killed by colonisers led by the settler he had helped.

A young Māori woman convinces her father to join the resistance against the British occupation, although he fears for the safety of his family and community.

During World War I, a Samoan slave-soldier and a Turkish (Ottoman) soldier fighting on opposite sides find common ground and friendship despite language barriers and cultural differences.

Thousands of years in the future, a young girl tries to find medicine for her ailing father in a horrifying dystopian future where Aboriginal and other Indigenous peoples are deported to off-world colonies as slave labour by a Nazi-like regime, founded after a war between the global north (led by the US) and the global south (led by China) devastated the planet and wiped out 80% of the human population.

After her mother was assaulted in a racist attack by state security officers, an activist and graffiti artist plans to burn down Cooks' Cottage with the help of a new friend.

A young man, reeling from the loss of his mother, searches for his family during riots and witnesses police brutality firsthand.

An Indigenous man living in the Northern Territory, where it is illegal for Aboriginal people to purchase alcohol, finds himself targeted by white police when he tries to buy a six-pack of beer.

== Production ==
The film was produced by Mitchell Stanley and Toni Stowers of No Coincidence Media, with Mia Henry-Teirney of Marama Films.

The chapters were directed by Beck Cole, Dena Curtis, Tracey Rigney, Danielle MacLean, Tim Worrall, Renae Maihi, Miki Magasiva, Mario Gaoa, Richard Curtis and Chantelle Burgoyne, and span a range of approaches including historical war drama, futuristic speculative fiction and animation.

== Release ==
We Are Still Here premiered as the opening film of the 69th Sydney Film Festival, and had its North American premiere in the Contemporary World Cinema program at the 2022 Toronto International Film Festival on 10 September 2022.

== Reception ==
Luke Buckmaster, writing in The Guardian, gave the film four stars out of five, calling it "elegantly constructed... unquestionably memorable and, at times, a thrilling achievement".

== Accolades ==
We Are Still Here won the Dramatic Feature Award at the 2022 imagineNATIVE Film and Media Arts Festival.
