= Merwez Whaleboat =

Australian actress

- Born: Townsville, Queensland
- Education: Heatley High School, Townsville; Deakin University
- Occupation: Actress
- Notable work: RAN Remote Area Nurse; Mabo
- Children: 3

Merwez Whaleboat is an Australian actress.

== Early life ==
Whaleboat, the eldest daughter of Donald (a pastor and teacher) and Dulcie Whaleboat is a Torres Strait Islander who was born in Townsville. Her native language is Mercian, an Eastern Islands dialect, and she became more articulate at English while studying drama at Heatley High School, Townsville. Prior to that, she attended Currajong State School at primary level.

She left Townsville to "find her feet", but settled on Murray Island, where her parents lived, to raise her three kids and externally study a double bachelor degree in Arts and Education (majoring in drama and literature) at Melbourne's Deakin University, where she is member of the Golden Key National Honour Society. She wrote and performed a one-woman play Dad, Me and Uncle Koiki while studying.

== Career ==
For Whaleboat's performance in RAN Remote Area Nurse she was nominated for the 2006 Australian Film Institute Award for Best Guest or Supporting Actress in a Television Drama.

Other roles include Warwick Thornton's film The Darkside and the TV productions The Straits (2012), Mabo (2012) and Blue Water Empire (2019).

A big lover of literature, Whaleboat is also a published poet, her poems "King Kebisu" and "Coconut Sails" feature in the anthology book "Mangoes on Fire" launched by the Tropical Writers Group of Cairns. She also wrote the poem "Markai", meaning 'ghost/spirit' (2009).

== Personal life ==
Whaleboat is mother to three daughters, Swana, Tei-ri and Diari.

She became a teacher at Shalom Christian College in Townsville.

== Filmography ==
=== Film ===
Year	Title	Role	Type
2012	Mabo	Maisa Mabo	TV docudrama movie
2013	The Darkside	Lesigo	Anthology film

==== As director ====
Year	Title	Role	Type
2018	Uncle Willie	Director	Short documentary film

=== Television ===
Year	Title	Role	Type
2006	RAN Remote Area Nurse	Bernadette Gaibui	6 episodes
2012	The Straits	Auntie Lorraine	Miniseries, 1 episode
2015	Ready for This	Mrs Ban	2 episodes
2019	Blue Water Empire	Pamoy / Flora Anosa	Docudrama miniseries

== Awards and nominations ==
Year	Nominated work	Award	Category	Result	Ref.
2006	RAN Remote Area Nurse	AACTA Awards	Best Guest or Supporting Actress in a Television Drama	Nominated	
