= Waru (2017 film) =

- Film poster
- Directed by: Ainsley Gardiner; Casey Kaa; Renae Maihi; Awanui Simich-Pene; Briar Grace-Smith; Paula Whetu Jones; Chelsea Winstanley; Katie Wolfe
- Written by: Ainsley Gardiner; Casey Kaa; Renae Maihi; Briar Grace-Smith; Josephine Stewart-Tewhiu; Paula Whetu Jones; Katie Wolfe
- Produced by: Kiel McNaughton; Kerry Warkia
- Cinematography: Drew Sturge
- Edited by: Rajneel Singh
- Music by: Lauren King
- Distributed by: Māori Television
- Release date: 19 October 2017
- Running time: 86 minutes
- Country: New Zealand
- Languages: English; Māori
- Box office: NZ$265,893 (worldwide); NZ$215,000 (estimated)

Waru is a 2017 New Zealand semi-anthology drama film about the tangi (funeral) of a small boy named Waru who dies at the hands of his caregiver, and how the boy's death impacts the community.

== Plot ==
The underlying story is the tangi (funeral) of a small boy named Waru who has died at the hands of his caregiver, and how the boy's death impacts the community.

The film spans eight stories, each starting at 9:59 the morning of the tangi.

=== Charm ===
Aunty Charm directs the food preparation for the funeral at the kāuta (kitchen) in the local marae.

=== Anahera ===
Waru's kindergarten teacher, Anahera, processes the loss with her class and colleagues.

=== Mihi ===
Single mother Mihi struggles to care for her kids with no money for gas or food.

=== Em ===
Young singer Em comes home from a raucous night out to find she is locked out of her house, and her baby is inside.

=== Ranui ===
Two great-grandmothers of Waru, Ranui and Hinga, argue over where his body should rest so that his wairua (spirit) is at peace.

=== Kiritapu ===
Anchorwoman Kiritapu endures microaggressions and overt racism alike while her colleagues discuss the murder of Waru.

=== Mere ===
Young teen Mere, armed with a tokotoko, plucks up the courage to talk back to her abuser.

=== Titty & Bash ===
Two sisters, Titty and Bash, drive to reclaim Bash's children from an abusive household.

== Cast ==
- Tanea Heke as Aunty Charm
- Roimata Fox as Anahera
- Ngapaki Moetara as Mihi
- Awhina-Rose Ashby as Em
- Kararaina Rangihau as Ranui
- Merehaka Maaka as Hinga
- Maria Walker as Kiritapu
- Acacia Hapi as Mere
- Amber Curreen as "Titty" (short for Whatitiri or "thunder" in Māori)
- Miriama McDowell as "Bash" (a nickname derived from Uira or "lightning" in Māori)

== Production ==
NZ On Air and New Zealand Film Commission funding was obtained in 2015.

The film consists of eight 10-minute long takes, written and directed by nine Māori women (one on each of the first seven stories, with two on the last one, "Titty & Bash"). The producers issued a challenge to the film-makers: Each story had to have a female lead, begin at 9:59am, and be shot in one day, using one continuous take.

The writer-directors for each film were:

- Charm – Briar Grace-Smith
- Anahera – Casey Kaa
- Mihi – Ainsley Gardiner
- Em – Katie Wolfe
- Ranui – Renae Maihi
- Kiritapu – Chelsea Winstanley
- Mere – Paula Jones
- Titty & Bash – Josephine Stewart-Te Whiu & Awanui Simich-Pene

== Release ==
After featuring at the New Zealand International Film Festival and Toronto International Film Festival in 2017, it received a general release in New Zealand in October 2017. It then featured in a number of other film festivals.

It subsequently became available on the free subscription services SBS On Demand and Beamafilm in Australia.

== Accolades ==
Waru won the Jury Grand Prix, Best feature film, at the 2019 Rencontres internationales du cinéma des Antipodes (Antipodean Film Festival) in Saint-Tropez, France.

The film won the audience award at Seattle International Film Festival and the grand jury award for an outstanding international narrative feature at the 34th Asia-Pacific Film Festival in Los Angeles.

It also won the Indigenous Rights award at the Wairoa Māori Film Festival.

In the 2022 Sight and Sound poll of the greatest films of all time, Waru received one vote.
