= Aaron Fa'aoso =

Australian actor, screenwriter and producer

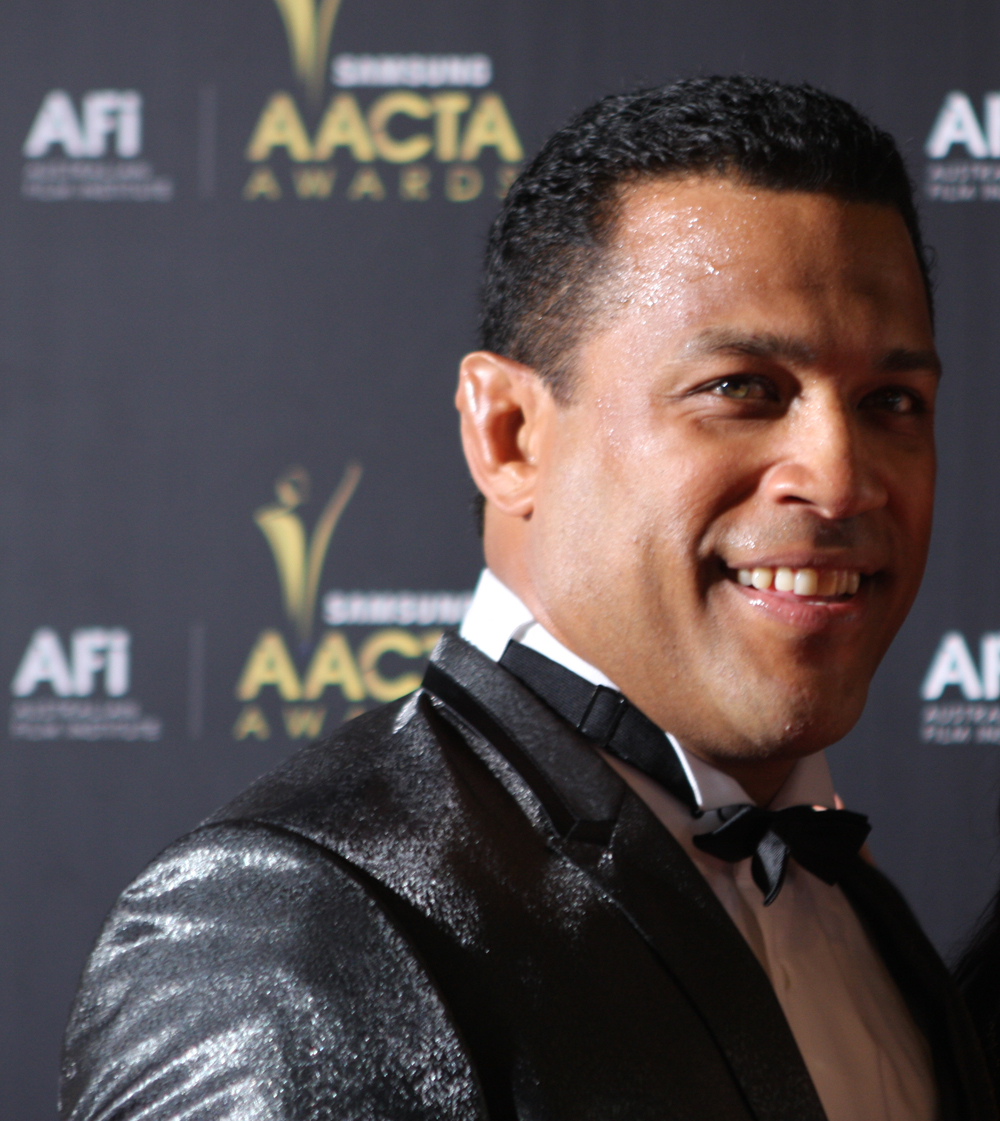
- Fa'aoso at the 2012 AACTA Awards
- Occupations: Actor; screenwriter; producer
- Television: East West 101; RAN; The Straits; Black Comedy

Aaron Fa'aoso is an Australian actor, screenwriter and producer, known for his roles in East West 101, The Straits (which he also wrote and produced) and Black Comedy. He established Lonestar Productions in 2013, which brings stories of the people of the Torres Strait Islands and north Queensland to the screen.

== Early life and education ==
Fa'aoso was born into the Kheodal (Crocodile) and Samu (Emu) clans of Torres Strait Islanders people, his family having moved from Saibai Island to the mainland of Australia in 1947. He is also of Samoan and Tongan descent. He grew up in "a big Torres Strait Islander community" in Bamaga on the Cape York Peninsula, Queensland.

He graduated high school, and worked as a sexual health worker in Bamaga, and played rugby league football in the Australian Rugby League and Super League competitions. He moved from Cairns to Sydney to pursue a rugby career, joining the Canterbury Bulldogs rugby league club.

== Career ==
Fa'aoso began his acting television career in 2006, where he played Eddie Gaibui on RAN, a six-part drama which aired on SBS One. In late 2007 to early 2008 he appeared in the first series of another SBS drama series, East West 101, playing Detective Sonny Koa. Later that year he had a guest role in Sea Patrol, which aired on Network Nine.

In 2009 he appeared in season two of East West 101 and starred in the film Subdivision. In 2011, he returned to star in the third and final season of East West 101 on SBS.

In 2012, he appeared in the last four episodes of the Australian drama TV series Bikie Wars: Brothers in Arms.

Also in 2012, he wrote, produced and starred in ABC Television's's 10-part drama series The Straits, about a north Queensland crime family. The series was highly praised by critics, with one calling it The Sopranos of the Top End.

Fa'aoso has appeared as a recurring character in the ABC sketch comedy series, Black Comedy (2014–2020).

=== Writing ===
In 2022 Fa'aoso published his memoir with Michelle Scott Tucker. So Far, So Good was the first memoir to be published commercially by a Torres Strait Islander.

In 2025, Fa'aoso and Michelle Scott Tucker teamed up again to publish a middle grade fiction novel, Spirit of the Crocodile. It was shortlisted for the Children's Book of the Year Award: Younger Readers in 2026.

== Lonestar Productions ==
Fa'aso's main interest is in telling Indigenous stories. To that end, he created Lonestar Productions in 2013. The company makes films in the Torres Strait and Cape York regions, and has produced documentary series such as Blue Water Empire (about the history of the Torres Strait Islander people) and Strait to the Plate (food in the islands), in which Fa'aoso features.

== Other roles ==
Since at least 2018 and as of June 2022 Fa'aoso is on the board of Screen Queensland.

== Recognition and awards ==
- 2006: Nominated at the AFI Awards for Best Guest or Supporting Actor in Television Drama for RAN
- 2007: Nominated at the Logies for Graham Kennedy Award for Most Outstanding New Talent for RAN
- 2011: Finalist in the Deadly Awards, for Male Actor of the Year
- 2012: Winner, Deadly Awards, Television Show of the Year, for The Straits
- 2012: Winner, AWGIE Award, Television Mini-Series – Original, for The Straits

In February 2024, Fa'aoso was announced as one of six recipients of the Talent Gateway program, a joint initiative of Screen Australia and Australians in Film. The program aims to help develop their skills and creative connections necessary for Australian screenwriters and directors to succeed further in the international market.

== Filmography ==
=== Film ===
Year	Title	Role	Notes
2009	Subdivision	Solly	
2014	Man	Jungle	Short film
2016	Goldstone	Bear	
2017	Outlaws	Motu	
2024	Audrey	Bourke	

=== Television ===
Year	Title	Role	Notes
2006	RAN Remote Area Nurse	Eddie Gaibui	4 episodes
2008	Sea Patrol	Massita Balanbaan	2 episodes
2010	City Homicide	Benji Fa'alonga	Episode: "Tomato Can"
2007-11	East West 101	Sonny Koa	20 episodes
2012	The Straits	Noel Montebello	10 episodes
2012	Bikie Wars: Brothers in Arms	Roo	6 episodes
2013	München 7	Senior Constable Bob Wheeler	Episode: "Magic"
2014–20	Black Comedy	Various characters	24 episodes
2016	Hyde & Seek	Maru Salesi	4 episodes
2017	Little J & Big Cuz	Old Dog (voice)	
2018	Street Smart	Lenny	Episode: "The Pop-Up Nightclub"
2019	Reef Break	Mr. Cher	2 episodes
2019	Blue Water Empire	Various characters, narration	4 episodes; produced by Lonestar
2021-23	Strait to the Plate	Self-Presenter	11 episodes
2023	In Limbo	Nikora	6 episodes

== Personal life ==
In 2012 he pleaded guilty to wilful damage and disorderly conduct following an incident at a Cairns nightclub and was placed on a good behaviour bond for six months and ordered to pay costs plus damages. The incident happened on the anniversary of a family tragedy, and the magistrate took into account Fa'aoso's previous good character. Cairns Mayor Val Schier described Fa'aoso as "a role model who is highly regarded".
