= Kangaroo (2025 film) =

2025 Australian film by Kate Woods

- Theatrical release poster
- Directed by: Kate Woods
- Written by: Harry Cripps; Melina Marchetta
- Produced by: David Jowsey; Greer Simpkin; Angela Littlejohn; Rachel Clements; Trisha Morton-Thomas
- Starring: Ryan Corr; Lily Whiteley; Deborah Mailman; Rachel House; Rarriwuy Hick; Rick Donald; Brooke Satchwell
- Cinematography: Kieran Fowler
- Edited by: Chris Plummer
- Music by: Matteo Zingales; Josie Mann
- Production companies: Cultivator Films Australia; Bunya Productions; Brindle Films
- Distributed by: StudioCanal
- Release dates: 21 August 2025 (Germany); 18 September 2025 (Australia)
- Running time: 107 minutes
- Country: Australia
- Language: English
- Box office: US$7,939,318

Kangaroo is a 2025 Australian family comedy film directed by Kate Woods, written by Harry Cripps and Melina Marchetta, and starring Ryan Corr, Lily Whiteley, Deborah Mailman, Rachel House, Rarriwuy Hick, Rick Donald, and Brooke Satchwell. Inspired by Chris 'Brolga' Barns, the founder of The Kangaroo Sanctuary, the film follows Chris who after being stranded, teams up with a young girl to help rehabilitate young injured joeys.

The film was released in Australia on 18 September 2025.

== Plot ==
When weatherman Chris Masterman becomes stranded on his way to Broome, Western Australia, he teams up with a young girl named Charlie, forming an unlikely friendship. The two come together to take care of young injured kangaroos.

== Cast ==
The cast was announced on the same day production was announced, with Ryan Corr playing the lead.

- Ryan Corr as Chris Masterman
- Rachel House as Jesse
- Lily Whiteley as Charlie
- Brooke Satchwell as Liz
- Deborah Mailman as Rosie
- Rarriwuy Hick as Brenda
- Rick Donald as Trap
- Ryan Clark as Lifeguard Jacko
- Wayne Blair as Ralph
- Trisha Morton-Thomas as Gwennie
- Emily Taheny as Dorinda
- Ernie Dingo as Dave
- Clarence Ryan as Nick
- Roy Billing as Murray
- Geneviève Lemon as Bernadette

== Production ==
On 16 May 2024, it was announced that the film had gone into production after being in active development for two years prior to the announcement. The film would film on location in Alice Springs where joeys from the Kangaroo Sanctuary would be used for the film, and locations across Sydney. The film was produced by Cultivator Films Australia with Bunya Productions and Brindle Films, with funding from both Screen Australia and Screen Territory, and StudioCanal handling international sales.

== Release ==
On 26 November 2024, the first trailer for the film was released. On 12 February 2025, it was announced that the film would release in Australia and New Zealand on 18 September 2025. The film was first released in Germany and Austria early on 21 August.

The film would later go on to be released in the United Kingdom on the 30th January 2026.

== Reception ==
The flim has an average critic rating of 7.2/10 on Rotten Tomatoes as being 93%. One of the critics saying that "It’s generic stuff -- the adorable redemption arc is as predictable as the boxing kangaroo comedy interlude. But it’s a wholesome, likeable option for younger audiences, and a refreshingly human alternative to machine-tooled studio offerings."
