= Dena Curtis =

Australian filmmaker

- Occupations: Film producer, director, writer
- Years active: 2003–present

Dena Curtis is an Australian film producer and director. She is known for writing and directing several short films, and directed the first series of ABC Television comedy series 8MMM Aboriginal Radio in 2015. She co-developed and co- produced the 2018 children's TV series Grace Beside Me, and co-produced the documentary series First Weapons (2023) and Firebite (2024). She is the owner of production company Inkey Media in Brisbane, Queensland.

== Early life and education ==
Dena Curtis is from Central Australia, and is of the Warrumungu, Warlpiri and Arrernte peoples.

After completing school, Curtis worked as a media officer at the local language centre in Tennant Creek, a small town in the Northern Territory. She was offered a traineeship, which led her to working with a film crew from Central Australian Aboriginal Media Association (CAAMA) who were filming in the town. Some months later CAAMA encouraged her to apply for a role as production assistant. She was hired for the role, working for CAAMA Productions in Alice Springs before moving to Sydney to undertake studies in film.

In 2002, Curtis graduated from the Australian Film Television and Radio School (AFTRS) in Sydney with a Graduate Diploma (Film & Television) in Television Editing.

== Career ==
After graduating from AFTRS, Curtis returned to work at CAAMA Productions for several years. Her editing credits include Rosalie's Journey, Lore of Love, and Willaberta Jack, as well as a documentary called Cheeky Dog, which she also directed. She also directed the documentary short Eight Ladies, released in 2010, which follows eight women from Alyawarr country in the Sandover River region who travel into the bush for five days to hunt and gather bush foods. A digital, fully-restored version of the film was shown as one of four to be shown at a special event mounted by the Cinema Reborn film festival (Note: "Cinema Reborn began in 2018 and is dedicated to presenting digital restorations of classic cinema from around the world.") in October 2021.

Her first fully-funded short film was Hush, a five-minute narrative film written and directed by Curtis starring Aboriginal country music singer Auriel Andrew, in 2007. It was one of a series called Bit of Black Business, which showcased Indigenous Australian filmmakers.

Her second short film, Jacob, premiered at the Message Sticks Indigenous Film Festival in 2009, and screened at the Melbourne International Film Festival, the WOW Film Festival, Shorts Film Festival in Adelaide, (Note: A former festival run by Flinders University.) and several international festivals. Curtis wrote and directed the film, while Darren Dale of Blackfella Films produced it. The dialogue was in Warrumungu, with English subtitles. Set in around 1940 in Central Australia, the 12-minute film tackled the most serious subject matter she had so far attempted. Jacob is the product of the rape of his mother, Gina, by a white man, and Gina suffers from post-natal depression. Curtis drew on a stories from her own family history for the film, and said that "I want the audience to see proud Indigenous men and the lives they once lived". According to Alexandra Garcia in a 2018 article: "Curtis' exploration throughout Jacob of poor mental health as a result of sexual abuse, as well as life for Indigenous citizens during the Stolen Generations, is no doubt the most heartbreaking, honest and confronting eleven minutes of film to hit Australian television screens in recent times." In April 2018, the film was re-aired by NITV as part of its The New Black series, a compilation of short films by Indigenous filmmakers relating to culture, country, and history.

Curtis then moved back to Sydney to work at National Indigenous Television (NITV) as a senior editor and promo producer. After this she worked for ABC Television, first as series producer for Message Stick, and then as a commissioning editor. In this role she oversaw the production and development of The Darkside, Yagan, Buckskin (2013; about Kaurna language teacher Jack Buckskin, directed by Dylan River and Glynn McDonald), The Redfern Story, Outside Chance, and Wild Kitchen.

In 2015 she formed her own production company, Inkey Media, based in Brisbane, and has since worked as writer, director, and producer on many programs.

She produced the 2018 ABC Me children's television series, Grace Beside Me, as well as several short films and documentaries. She co-produced the AMC+ drama series Firebite (2021), created by Warwick Thornton and Brendan Fletcher.

Curtis directed two episodes of the ABC series Back to Nature, a segment of the 2022 anthology feature We Are Still Here, and feature-length documentary A League of Her Own (2021), about women's rugby league team the Queensland Maroons.

She is executive producer and co-producer (with Citt Williams) on the 2023 four-part NITV documentary series Rebel With a Cause, which screened at the Melbourne International Film Festival. The series tells the stories of four famous Indigenous people: Pat O'Shane, Neville Bonner, Oodgeroo Noonuccal, and Tiga Bayles. Also in 2023 she co-produced (with Darren Dale of Blackfella Films) and co-wrote (with Jacob Hickey) the documentary series First Weapons for the ABC. Directed by Dean Gibson and hosted by Phil Breslin, the series looks at the complex scientific principles behind traditional Aboriginal weapons, discussing and testing them with weapon makers and scientific experts.

Curtis said in an interview during NAIDOC Week in 2024:

Screen is a powerful platform for sharing stories of our cultural, people and history. It will always play a part in presenting stories and portraying characters that imbue our community spirit, cultural pride and sharing information to encourage all Australians to stand in solidarity. For Aboriginal and Torres Strait Islander practitioners, screen storytelling is our form of activism, we may not change the world but we can play a small part in shifting the hearts and minds of people watching.

== Other activities ==
Curtis has mentored emerging filmmakers, and participated in many development workshops supporting their careers. She has facilitated Screen Australia's Indigenous Producer Program, a national initiative, as well as the 2020 "Make it FNQ: Creating Screen Stories" initiative supported by Screenworks and Screen Queensland for first-time and early First Nations filmmakers in Far North Queensland.

Curtis was a guest speaker at the Australian International Documentary Conference in 2023 and 2024.

In July 2024, she was a guest speaker at the inaugural "Regionality Sunshine Coast" documentary and factual filmmaking event.

== Recognition and awards ==
- 2008: Winner, Audience Award for Best Foreign Short Film, Films de Femmes, Créteil
- 2009: Winner, Jacob, Best Australian Fiction, at Adelaide Shorts Film Festival
- 2009: Nominated, Jacob, Best Short Drama, WOW Film Festival
- 2010: Winner, Jacob, Gold Shorts Award at Flickerfest International Short Film Festival
- 2010: Winner, Jacob, Australian Cinematographers Society National Awards, Award for Best Fictional Drama Short – Murray Lui (cinematographer)
- 2018: Winner, Grace Beside Me, Children's Series Production of the Year, at the Screen Producers Australia Awards
- 2018: Nominated, Grace Beside Me, AACTA Award for Best Children's Program
- 2022: Winner, We Are Still Here, Dramatic Feature Award at the ImagineNATIVE Film and Media Arts Festival in Canada

In 2024, Curtis was named as one of the participants in the Global Producers Exchange, a program hosted by Screen Australia and Australians in Film that supports the development of Indigenous and cultural stories with internationally based collaborators.
