= The Sunshine Club =

- Music: John Rodgers
- Lyrics: Wesley Enoch
- Book: Wesley Enoch
- Productions: 1999–2000 Brisbane/Sydney; 2022 Brisbane

The Sunshine Club is an Australian musical with book and lyrics by Wesley Enoch and music by John Rodgers.

== Synopsis ==
Set in Brisbane, the story concerns Frank Doyle, an Aboriginal serviceman who has come home from World War II to find that although the wider world may have changed, attitudes back home are just the same. Filled with a defiant energy and ambition for a better life, Frank starts The Sunshine Club, a place where black and white can meet and, most importantly, dance. Here he dreams of a future where he can dance in step with Rose, the girl next door, the girl of his dreams.

== Development and production ==
The Sunshine Club was commissioned by the Queensland Theatre Company and the work had a three-year development period. Nick Enright was script consultant.

The original Queensland Theatre Company production opened at the Queensland Performing Arts Centre Playhouse in Brisbane on 26 November 1999, after a short season at Cairns' Civic Theatre. Also directed by Enoch, the production was choreographed by Bangarra Dance Theatre artistic director Stephen Page and had musical direction by Wayne Freer. Richard Roberts was designer with lighting design by Matthew Scott.

Following its Brisbane run, the production moved to the Sydney Opera House Drama Theatre, presented by the Sydney Theatre Company in association with the Sydney Festival and the Sydney Opera House Trust. It opened on 15 January 2000 and closed after a six-week season.

Queensland Theatre produced a 2022 revival at the QPAC Playhouse, featuring Marcus Corowa as Frank, Irena Lysiuk as Rose and Roxanne McDonald as Aunty Faith. Enoch again directed with choreography by Yolande Brown. A national tour, mainly to suburban and regional theatres, commenced in 2023.

== Reception and awards ==
The Sunshine Club was well received, including for its examination of race relations in Australia. The Australian said that “The Sunshine Club... signals a brilliant new landmark in Australian musicals… an unashamedly feel-good musical" while the Sydney Morning Herald called it "immensely entertaining… a significant achievement. The openness and joy radiating from The Sunshine Club is certain to make your spirits soar".

Wesley Enoch won a 1999 Brisbane Matilda Award for book, lyrics and direction of The Sunshine Club. The Queensland Theatre Company also received a special Matilda Award for developing and producing the work.

Enoch and Rodgers received a 2000 Deadly Award for Excellence in Film or Theatrical Score for the musical.

Stephen Page was nominated for a 2001 Helpmann Award for Best Choreography in a Musical for the production.

== Musical numbers ==
- "Lest We Forget"
- "We Dance/Shadows Dance"
- "The Sunshine Club"
- "Dare to Dream"
- "Sellin' Man"
- "Dancin' Up a Storm"
- "Let It Rain"
- "We Dance"
- "I Will Remember You"
- "Shake a Leg"
- "Shadow Dancer"
- "Passionfruit Vine"
- "Sit Down Mr. Menzies"
- "Strictly Saturday Night"
- "Hey Sister"
- "Homecoming"
- "If Not Now Then When?"

A three-track CD recording of the songs "We Dance" and "Passionfruit Vine" performed by Ursula Yovich and "Let It Rain" performed by Natalie O'Donnell (both original cast members) was released.
