= Charles Passi =

Australian actor and musician

- Occupations: Actor, musician

Charles Passi is an Australian actor and musician from the Torres Strait Islands. His acting career began as a regular on RAN Remote Area Nurse. For this role he was nominated for the 2006 AFI Award for Best Lead Actor in a Television Drama. He was also a main cast member of Grace Beside Me.
