= Blue Water Empire =

2019 Australian documentary series

Blue Water Empire is a three-part Australian dramatised-documentary series aired on ABC TV in 2019, which gives an insight into the history of the Torres Strait Islands. The series features the history of the islands from the pre-colonial era through to contemporary times. It is centred on key stories told by the men and women of the region, brought to life by dramatic re-enactments.

It was produced by Aaron Fa'aoso's film production company, Lonestar Productions.

== Cast ==
- Ryan Corr as Captain Banner
- Damian Walshe-Howling as Wing Commander Donald Thompson
- Aaron Fa'aoso as Narrator / Various characters
- Jimi Bani
- Roy Billing
- Geoff Morrell as Government official
- Jeremy Lindsay Taylor
- Peter Phelps as Commanding Officer
- Merwez Whaleboat
- Robert Mammone as Major
- Damian De Montemas as Lieutenant
