= Vicki Saylor =

Australian actress

- Occupation: Actress
- Notable work: Call Me Mum

Vicki Saylor is an Australian actress from Townsville in Northern Queensland. For her performance in Call Me Mum she won the 2007 Australian Film Institute Award for Best Guest or Supporting Actress in Television Drama. She plays Flo, a Torres Strait islander woman, who while ill in hospital is reunited with her son who was taken from her as a baby many years ago. Saylor is a Torres Strait Islander of Darnley Island (Queensland) descent.
