= True Colours (Australian TV series) =

Australian TV series

True Colours is an Australian drama miniseries broadcast from 4 July 2022 on SBS TV and NITV. The four-part miniseries was created, written and directed by Erica Glynn and Steven McGregor, and stars Rarriwuy Hick as a detective in a remote community in the Northern Territory.

== Synopsis ==
True Colours tells the story of detective Toni Alma, who is assigned to investigate a suspicious car accident in Perdar Theendar, the Aboriginal community she left as a child. The story touches on the place of Indigenous Australian art and the practices of the global art world, and explores Aboriginal culture.

== Cast ==
- Rarriwuy Hick as Detective Toni Alma
- Warren H. Williams as Samuel Alma
- Luke Arnold as Nick Gawler
- Errol Shand as Bull
- Emilie de Ravin as Liz Hindmarsh
- Trisha Morton-Thomas as Theodora
- Ben Oxenbould as Gingerbread Man
- Miranda Otto as Isabelle Martin
- Megan Hollier as Amanda

== Episodes ==
No.	Title	Directed by	Written by	Original release date	Australia viewers (millions)
1	"Episode 1"	Erica Glynn	Steven McGregor, Warren H Williams, Erica Glynn	July 4, 2022	N/A
2	"Episode 2"	Steven McGregor	Danielle MacLean, Warren H Williams, Erica Glynn	July 5, 2022	N/A
3	"Episode 3"	Erica Glynn	Erica Glynn, Warren H Williams	July 6, 2022	N/A
4	"Episode 4"	Steven McGregor	Steven McGregor, Warren H Williams, Erica Glynn	July 7, 2022	N/A

== Production ==
The four-part miniseries was created, written and directed by Erica Glynn and Steven McGregor. Danielle MacLean also wrote for the series, which was produced by Greer Simpkin, David Jowsey and Penny Smallacombe for SBS Television and NITV.

It was filmed entirely on location in the Macdonnell Ranges, east of Alice Springs, including in the community of Amoonguna. Hundreds of works by artists from Central Australia feature in the series, which represents Arrernte culture and language.

== Release and reception ==
True Colours premiered simultaneously on SBS Television and National Indigenous TV on 4 July 2022 as well as on SBS on Demand, running over four consecutive nights on television.

Critics gave the series favourable reviews, with TV Week calling it "authentic and powerful".
