= Renae Maihi =

New Zealand film director

- Born: Auckland, New Zealand
- Occupations: Director, writer, producer
- Years active: 2009–present
- Children: 1
- Website: https://www.renaemaihi.com/

Renae Maihi is a New Zealand film director and screenwriter. She is best known for her work on the anthology films Waru and We Are Still Here, both of which premiered at the Toronto International Film Festival in 2017 and 2022 respectively.

== Early life and education ==
Renae Maihi was born in Auckland, New Zealand. She is Māori of the Ngāpuhi and Te Arawa tribes as well as Pākehā.

== Career ==
In 2009, Maihi made her writing debut with Nga Manurere, starring Keisha Castle-Hughes. In 2010, she made her screenwriting debut with short film, Redemption, which premiered at the 60th Berlin International Film Festival and Sundance Film Festival.

Her play, Patua, about child abuse, won Adam NZ Play Award for best play by a Maori Playwright 2013, and her directorial theatre debut garnered critical acclaim in New Zealand. She subsequently wrote and directed the short film, Butterfly (Purerehua), funded by the New Zealand Film Commission. Butterfly premiered as part of the ImagineNATIVE Film Festival Māori spotlight in 2013 and screened in a programme alongside Taika Waititi's Two Cars One Night.

In 2015, her short film, Mannahatta, premiered at ImagineNATIVE Film Festival in Toronto. Mannahatta was later selected as a finalist for "Best Short Film" at the New Zealand International Film Festival. During 2015, she worked on series 2 of My Kitchen Rules NZ as the Talent coordinator.

Maihi wrote and directed a 10-minute segment of the anthology film Waru. The film's other seven segments were written and directed by eight other Māori women filmmakers, and was made up of a series of vignettes which addressed the widespread issue of child abuse in New Zealand. The film premiered at the Toronto International Film Festival, won the audience award at Seattle International Film Festival and the grand jury award for an outstanding international narrative feature at the 34th Asia-Pacific Film Festival in Los Angeles. It was also screened at the Wairoa Māori Film Festival, where it won the Indigenous Rights award.

In 2018, she was awarded the NZFC Maori Screen Excellence Award and Whakapapa Film Festival of Italy Award. Her films were screened as part of a retrospective on Māori filmmakers at Auckland's first Māori Film Week and the New Zealand International Film Festival.

She directed one of the segments of the anthology film We Are Still Here, which premiered as the opening film of the 2022 Sydney Film Festival and had its North American premiere in the Contemporary World Cinema program at the 2022 Toronto International Film Festival. We Are Still Here won Best Dramatic Feature Film at the 2022 imagineNATIVE Film Festival in Toronto.

=== Bob Jones v Renae Maihi ===
For Waitangi Day in 2018, Bob Jones wrote an opinion piece calling for an annual "Māori Gratitude Day", where among other things he suggested that Māori serve breakfast in bed to Europeans as Māori owe their existence to British migrants. The opinion piece was published in the National Business Review on 2 February and caused so much outrage that it was soon deleted from their website. In response, Maihi started a petition calling for Jones to be stripped of his knighthood (received as a Knight Bachelor in the 1989 Queen's Birthday Honours) and on 27 March 2018, the petition (with then 68,000 signatures) was presented to parliament and received by MPs Kiri Allan and Willie Jackson. In a seven to four majority decision in April 2018, the New Zealand Media Council did not uphold a complaint about the opinion piece, but noted that the National Business Review's decision to no longer publish columns by Jones was an "appropriate response to the justified public outrage".

In June 2018, Jones filed defamation papers with the Wellington High Court, seeking a ruling that the language used in Maihi's petition defamed him. Also in June 2018, community campaigner Te Raukura O'Connell Rapira started a crowdfunding campaign for Maihi's legal costs. The court hearing was set for 10 to 21 February 2020. In his initial cross examination, Jones admitted that he had never read the petition that he claims defames him.

On 14 February 2020 Jones withdrew the case.

== Personal life ==
As of 2021 Maihi is in a relationship with emerging First Nations Canadian filmmaker Judith Schuyler.

== Filmography ==
Year	Title	Writer	Director	Producer	Note
2010	Redemption	✓			Short Film
2013	Butterfly (Purerehua)	✓	✓	✓	Short Film
2015	Mannahatta	✓	✓	✓	Short Film
2016	Ka Puta, Ko Au	✓	✓		Short Film
2017	Waru	✓	✓		Anthology feature (segment)
2022	We Are Still Here	✓	✓		Anthology feature (segment)

=== Theatre ===
- Nga Manurere
- Patua
- Good Medicine

== Awards and nominations ==
Year	Result	Award	Category	Work	Ref.
2017	Won	New Zealand Writers Guild Awards	Best Feature Film Script	Waru	
2018	Won	Asia-Pacific Film Festival	Grand Jury Award	Waru	
2018	Won	Seattle International Film Festival	Audience Award	Waru	
2018	Won	Wairoa Māori Film Festival	MANA WAIROA FESTIVAL PRIZE	Waru	
2022	Won	imagineNATIVE Film and Media Arts Festival	Best Dramatic Feature Film	We Are Still Here	
