= African Moot (film) =

2022 South African film

- Directed by: Shameela Seedat
- Production companies: Generation Africa; Social Transformation and Empowerment Projects (STEPS); Undercurrent Film & Television; Tuffi Films
- Release date: May 2022
- Running time: 83 minutes
- Countries: South Africa; Finland
- Languages: English; French; Portuguese; Swahili

African Moot is a 2022 South African documentary film written and directed by lawyer turned filmmaker Shameela Seedat. The film is based on a set of aspiring lawyers who compete in the African Human Rights Moot Court Competition by representing the top law schools from their respective nations and they turn up for the event which is held in Gaborone, Botswana for a duration of one week at the African Court of Human Rights where social topics are taken up for debates which are deemed as fictional court cases. According to The Africa Report, it was ranked among top ten most notable African films of 2022.

The African Human Rights Moot Court Competition is an open platform and discourse where African law students can give their opinions and debate human rights concerns related to Africa.

== Synopsis ==
The documentary focuses on the passion for their chosen causes shown by the law students and the challenges they face. These causes include parts of African society including the human rights of migrants as well as those of members of the LGBTQ community.

The African lawmakers give their reflections on their thought processes following orations and on how they have demonstrated their knowledge of law during the mock-trial at the African Human Rights Moot Court Competition.

== Production ==
The film was produced by Generation Africa in collaboration with Social Transformation and Empowerment Projects (STEPS), Undercurrent Film & Television and Tuffi Films. The film was one of the 25 films which was selected for the Generation Africa project. The film project marked the second documentary directorial venture for filmmaker Shameela Seedat after Whispering Truth to Power (2018). The filmmaker Shameela Seedat arranged teams from four different nations for the documentary including law students from Makerere University in Uganda, American University in Cairo in Egypt, University of Cape Town in South Africa and University of Nairobi in Kenya.

== Release ==
The film was officially selected to be screened at the 2022 Hot Docs Canadian International Documentary Festival and was also selected to premiere at the Encounters South African International Documentary Festival. The film was also premiered at the 2022 Internationales Dokumentarfilmfestival München (DOK.fest München). The film was also screened at the 2022 Sydney Film Festival and was one of the two films from Generation Africa project to have been screened at the 2022 Sydney Film Festival with the other being No Simple Way Home. The film also screened at the 2022 Durban International Film Festival, 2022 Doc NYC and 2022 International Documentary Film Festival Amsterdam. The film was also screened at the Helsinki International Film Festival in September 2022.

== Accolades ==
The film won the Best African Documentary award at the Zimbabwe International Film Festival. It was also nominated in the category for Best Documentary at the Africa Movie Academy Awards in October 2022.
