= Trisha Morton-Thomas =

Australian Indigenous producer and actor

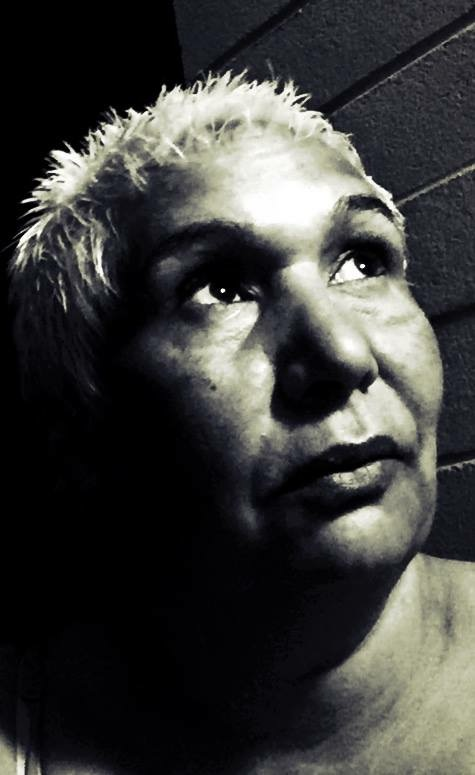
Trisha Morton-Thomas

Patricia Morton-Thomas, usually credited as Trisha Morton-Thomas, is an Australian writer, producer, director, and actress. Her first role in a feature film was in Radiance (1998), the first feature film by director Rachel Perkins. Morton-Thomas and Rachel Clements co-founded filmmaking company Brindle Films in Alice Springs in 2011.

== Early life ==
Morton-Thomas grew up in Alice Springs and the remote Northern Territory. She is an Aboriginal Australian of the Anmatyerr people.

== Career ==
Morton-Thomas started her career at the Central Australian Aboriginal Media Association (CAAMA) in 1983, where she worked as a volunteer radio announcer and later as a cadet journalist until 1990 when she moved to Darwin to work with the Australian Broadcasting Corporation there.

In 1991 Morton-Thomas moved to Sydney with her good friend Rachel Perkins, who, she says, "dragged me along with her".

In Sydney she worked with the newly-formed Bangarra Dance Theatre as a sound technician, collaborating with David Page on the soundtrack for Bangarra's first ballet, Praying Mantis Dreaming. In 1993 she studied with Noel Tovey in the Uta Hagen acting technique at the Eora College for Performing Arts.

After finishing at Eora College, Morton-Thomas appeared in Radiance in 1998, directed by Perkins. She played the main character, Mae.

In 2004, she returned to Alice Springs and began working with CAAMA as a production manager, producer, and director for their film production slate.

In 2007 Morton-Thomas joined the newly established National Indigenous Television as a commissioning editor, later being promoted to senior commissioning editor.

She was a presenter on the ABC Television show Message Stick.

In 2011 Morton-Thomas formed Brindle Films with Rachel Clements. Based in Alice Springs, Brindle films has produced feature films, documentaries and television shows.

In 2020 it was confirmed that ABC and Brindle Films would partner to produce MaveriX, a drama TV series aimed at children and young teenagers set in the world of junior motocross, which would be the largest ever local productions for the NT. It was shot in Alice Springs in 2021 and premiered on ABC Me on 1 April 2022, Morton-Thomas also appeared in the series.

Morton-Thomas and Rachel Clements co-produced a feature documentary about Audrey Napanangka, made by filmmaker Penelope McDonald, her son Dylan River, and others. The film took around 10 years to make and was released in 2023.

In 2023, Morton-Thomas appeared in the first season of Ten Pound Poms.

In May 2024 Morton-Thomas joined the production of feature film Kangaroo as cast and part of the crew. She was also announced as part of the cast for Foxtel/Binge drama High Country.

In 2024 Morton-Thomas appeared in the final season of Total Control, reprising her role from the first season.

== Filmography ==
Television appearances
Year	Title	Role	Notes
2019, 2024	Total Control	Jan Irving	5 episodes
2024	High Country	Gladys Cooper	2 episodes
2023	The Lost Flowers of Alice Hart	Mary	1 episode
2023	Ten Pound Poms	Auntie May	4 episodes
2022	True Colours	Theodora	4 episodes
2022	MaveriX	Barb Brewin	4 episodes
2020	Thalu	The Principal	1 episode
2015	8MMM Aboriginal Radio	Lola	6 episodes
2013-12	Redfern Now	Aunty Mona	2 episodes

=== Film appearances ===
Year	Title	Role	Notes
2025	Kangaroo	Gwennie	Feature film
2017	Nobody's Child	Nana Mae	Short
2002	Mimi	Mimi	Short
1998	Radiance	Mae	

Producer/crew
Year	Title	Role	Notes
2025	Kangaroo	Producer	Feature film
2022	Audrey Napanangka	Producer	
2022	MaveriX	Producer/cultural consultant	10 episodes
2021	Democracy, Darling!	Producer	Short
2021	Uluru and the Magician	Producer	
2021	History Bites Back	Producer	
2019	Robbie Hood	Cultural consultant	6 episodes
2019	Not Just Numbers	Executive producer	
2018	Finke:There and Back	Producer	
2017	Occupation: Native	Producer	
2017	Coat of Arms	Producer	Short
2017	The Song Keepes	Producer	
2015	8MMM Aboriginal Radio	Producer	6 episodes
2007	Wiliberta Jack	Development producer	Short
2006	Always Have and Always Will	Production coordinator	Short
2006	Sunset to Sunrise	Production coordinator	Short

== Awards ==
- 2018: Winner, ATOM Awards (Australian Teachers of Media Awards), Best Indigenous Video or Website, for Occupation Native (2017)
- 2018: Nominated, Film Critics Circle of Australia Awards, Best Documentary, for The Songkeepers (2017)
