= Danielle MacLean =

Australian filmmaker

Danielle MacLean is an Australian filmmaker. She is known for her writing on television series such as Little J & Big Cuz, 8MMM Aboriginal Radio and Redfern Now.

== Early life ==
MacLean is of the Luritja and Warumungu peoples of the Northern Territory of Australia.

== Career ==
MacLean started work at Central Australian Aboriginal Media Association (CAAMA) Productions as a production assistant, later moving on to writing and directing, working under Erica Glynn. She originally wanted to be a stills photographer.

She lived in Central Australia working on a TV documentary series called Nganampa Anwernekenhe which means "ours" in the Pitjantjatjara and Arrernte languages The series started in 1987 and comprised 187 half-hour episodes. which was shot in the bush communities and broadcast on Imparja Television.

In 1997, she was supported by Screen Australia's Indigenous unit to act as both writer and director of a short drama film, My Colour Your Kind, about an albino Aboriginal teenager attending a convent boarding school in Alice Springs. The film was selected for showing at several international film festivals, and nominated for several awards. Steven McGregor was producer on the film.

She left CAAMA in 1999, becoming a freelance writer and director.

In 2001 she wrote and directed For Who I am – Bonita Mabo, a documentary about Bonita Mabo.

She wrote and directed Queen of Hearts, a drama, released in 2004.

In 2012 MacLean wrote an episode of the acclaimed drama series, Redfern Now. In the same year, she wrote and produced Croker Island Exodus a documentary film which screened Sydney Film Festival and the Melbourne International Film Festival, and was broadcast on ABC Television.

MacLean wrote and directed Blown Away, released in 2014, an hour-long documentary about Cyclone Tracy which caused extensive damage to Darwin in 1974. The film shows previously unrecorded responses by Indigenous Darwinians to the disaster. The film features Aunty Kathy Mills, Dr Ella Stack, General Alan Stretton, Mayor Tiger Brennan, Prime Minister Gough Whitlam, publisher and writer Sophie Cunningham, and politician (later NT Human Rights Commissioner) Dawn Lawrie.

She wrote three episodes of the Indigenous Australian comedy series, 8MMM Aboriginal Radio, which aired on ABC2 in 2014.

She wrote episode 5 of the second series of Mystery Road, which went to air in 2020.

=== Collaborations ===
MacLean collaborates frequently with Steven McGregor, and has also worked with Warwick Thornton, her cousin Beck Cole, Trisha Morton-Thomas, and sound recordist and filmmaker David Tranter. She directed one of the segments of the anthology film We Are Still Here, which premiered as the opening film of the 2022 Sydney Film Festival. McLean also wrote for the Australian TV drama mini-series, True Colours, which was produced for SBS Television and NITV and aired in 2022.

== Awards and nominations ==
- 1998–2000: My Colour Your Kind – Nominations for an AFI Award (Best Screenplay in a Short Film, 1998); an Australian Film Critics Association Award; a Gold Award for Flickerfest 99, 8th International Film Festival (1999); and Best Cinematography, 8th Festival of Pacific Arts (2000).
- 2004: Queen of Hearts – AFI Award for Non-Feature Screenplay (writer and director)
- 2008: Double Trouble – AWGIE Award for screenwriting
- 2014: Blown Away – Best Documentary, Capricornia Film Awards at Darwin International Film Festival; Best director (Documentary) at the ADG Awards.
