= 8MMM Aboriginal Radio =

Australian television comedy series

- Also known as: 8MMM
- Genre: Comedy
- Created by: Anna Cadden; Rachel Clements; Sonja Dare; Trisha Morton-Thomas
- Written by: Trisha Morton-Thomas; Danielle MacLean; Sonja Dare
- Directed by: Dena Curtis
- Starring: Geoff Morrell; Shari Sebbens; Ian Meadows; Patricia Morton-Thomas; Laura Hughes
- Composer: Amy Bastow
- Country of origin: Australia
- No. of series: 1
- No. of episodes: 6

Production
- Executive producers: Andrea Denholm; Laura Waters; Sally Riley (ABC); Erica Glynn (Screen Australia)
- Producers: Rachel Clements; Patricia Morton-Thomas; Anna Cadden
- Production locations: Alice Springs, Northern Territory, Australia
- Cinematography: Erle Murray Lui
- Editor: Ken Sallows
- Production companies: Brindle Films; Princess Pictures

Original release
- Network: ABC
- Release: 29 April 2015 – present

8MMM Aboriginal Radio (8MMM), pronounced "8 Triple M", is a 2015 Australian television comedy series.

== Synopsis ==
The six-part series is set in an Alice Springs (Mparntwe) radio station whose Aboriginal crew air the day-to-day preoccupations of the town and its surrounds. This include issues such as housing (including within town camps), education, culture, money, alcohol and reconciliation.

The station is run by non-Indigenous people who easily fall into one of three categories – missionaries, mercenaries or misfits – the 3Ms.

== Cast ==
The main cast of the show include:

- Shari Sebbens as Jessie
- Ian Meadows as Jake
- Zac James as Jampajinpa
- Laura Hughes as Koala
- Elaine Crombie as Milly
- Geoff Morrell as Dave Cross
- Trisha Morton-Thomas as Lola

== Production and release ==
8MMM Aboriginal Radio began screening on ABC Television on 29 April 2015.

The series is written by Trisha Morton-Thomas, Danielle MacLean and Sonja Dare. It is produced by Morton-Thomas, Rachel Clements, and Anna Cadden and directed by Dena Curtis and Adrian Russell Wills.

== See also ==
- List of Australian television series
- List of programs broadcast by ABC (Australian TV network)
