= The Darkside (film) =

- Directed by: Warwick Thornton
- Produced by: Kath Shelper
- Starring: Bryan Brown; Jack Charles; Brendan Cowell
- Cinematography: Warwick Thornton
- Edited by: Roland Gallois
- Release date: 2013
- Running time: 94 minutes
- Country: Australia
- Language: English

The Darkside is a 2013 Australian anthology film directed by Warwick Thornton. It is a collection of ghost stories retold by actors. Thorton asked the public for Indigenous ghost stories and received 150 submissions. From this 13 were used to make the film of which 3 used the original audio recordings.

== Cast ==
- Bryan Brown
- Jack Charles
- Brendan Cowell
- Hakeem Davey
- Sacha Horler
- Claudia Karvan
- Miah Madden
- Deborah Mailman
- Lynette Narkle
- David Page
- Aaron Pedersen
- Ben Quilty
- Shari Sebbens
- Merwez Whaleboat

== Reception ==
The Guardian's Jane Howard gave it 3 stars and stated "The strong performances are captured with Thornton's crisp cinematography in charming and simple snapshots of Australia – an open verandah, a campfire, a marina – and yet the series of monologues fail to come together as a compelling feature film. With the stories tied together only thematically, there is no drive to the film and you wonder if linking the stories together in this form was the strongest way to present them." Reviewing for The Sydney Morning Herald Sandra Hall awarded the film 3 stars finishing "It's a slight film and sceptics are unlikely to be seduced - although they may find themselves charmed by the craft that goes into Thornton's eye for composition and the art that goes into the performances." In Perth's Sunday Times Gavin Bond gives it 3 out of 5 and a verdict of "Haunting but uneven Aussie doco" stating "While the acting is impressive, one can’t but help feeling that a film featuring more interviews with the real storytellers, (the film has three original narrators), would have been more involving, authentic and resonant." SBS's Peter Galvin writes "it takes for granted that our waking life is shared with the spirits of those dead, thought gone forever. In one way, that’s not an especially strange notion in movies or life. Still, the film’s convictions, its open disregard for forensic analysis, its very premise and philosophy, seems calculated to aggravate sceptics."
