= RAN Remote Area Nurse =

- Genre: Drama
- Written by: John Alsop; Sue Smith; Alice Addison
- Directed by: David Caesar; Catriona McKenzie
- Starring: Susie Porter; Charles Passi; Luke Carroll; Merwez Whaleboat; Jimi Bani; Aaron Fa’aoso; Peta Brady
- Country of origin: Australia
- Original language: English
- No. of series: 1
- No. of episodes: 6

Production
- Executive producer: Helen Panckhurst
- Producer: Penny Chapman
- Production locations: Masig Island, Queensland, Australia
- Editor: Shawn Seet
- Camera setup: Ian Jones
- Running time: 52 minutes
- Production company: Chapman Pictures Production

Original release
- Network: SBS
- Release: 5 January – 9 February 2006

RAN (Remote Area Nurse) is a six-episode Australian drama series that aired on SBS on 5 January 2006.

== Synopsis ==
After Helen Tremain's (Susie Porter) mother dies, she returns to a remote island in the Torres Strait where she previously worked for five years as the Remote Area Nurse charged with providing medical services to the Torres Strait Islanders community. She is talented, determined and yearns to belong in a place she feels a strong connection to. The community loves her but ultimately wants her gone.

Helen discovers the island is no longer the tropical paradise she remembers, with an incompetent substitute nurse, indigenous health workers rebelling and the community divided. She butts heads with the health department over controversial decisions, gets involved in island politics, navigates an outbreak of Dengue fever, and struggles to fight her attraction to married island Chairman, Russ Gaibui (Charles Passi).

The series also explores Russ's somewhat dysfunctional extended family, alcohol abuse, domestic violence, smuggling, love, marriage, death, politics, native title issues, religion, outsider influence on island life and other social dynamics.

== Cast ==
- Susie Porter as Helen Tremain
- Charles Passi as Russ Gaibui
- Billy Mitchell as Robert 'Robbo' Hoffman
- Luke Carroll as Paul Gaibui
- Margaret Harvey as Nancy Gaibui
- Merwez Whaleboat as Bernadette
- Jimi Bani as Solomon Gaibui
- Aaron Fa'aoso as Eddie Gaibui
- Serai Zaro as Ina Gaibui
- Peta Brady as Lindy Gaibui
- Belford Lui as Mick Gaibui
- Louisa Taylor as Myrtle
- Santa Marina Rodgers as Mrs Augustus
- Moses Kaddy as Doug Augustus
- Norah Bagiri as Lucy
- Fred Kebisu as Amos
- Bruce Spence as Vince
- John Brumpton as George
- Felix Williamson as Dr John Bourke
- Gabriel Ingui as Tuuks

== Episodes ==
No. overall	No. in season	Title	Directed by	Written by	Original release date
1	1	"The Coral Age"	David Caesar	John Alsop	5 January 2006
2	2	"One Ball"	Catriona McKenzie	John Alsop	12 January 2006
3	3	"The Coming of the Light"	David Caesar	Alice Addison	19 January 2006
4	4	"The Gardens of the Torres Strait"	Catriona McKenzie	Alice Addison	26 January 2006
5	5	"Blue Hawaii"	David Caesar	Sue Smith	2 February 2006
6	6	"Here Comes the Rain Again"	Catriona McKenzie	Sue Smith	9 February 2006

== Production ==
The first television drama ever made in the Torres Strait, the series was filmed entirely on Masig Island (better known by its European name Yorke Island), a tiny teardrop-shaped coral cay in the far northeast of the strait. The remote location is a three-hour flight from Cairns, and closer to Papua New Guinea than mainland Australia.

Series producer, Penny Chapman said the series was inspired by her sister Peta, who worked as a remote area nurse in the Torres Strait. Yorke Island nurse Robyn White was another of the inspirations for the character of Helen Tremain, spending three months on set as a medical consultant.

Casting director, Greg Apps spent months in the Torres Strait islands, Townsville, Brisbane and Cairns, conducting an extensive search for the Islander cast and engaging liaison people in each community.

Many of the cast were islanders, most acting for the first time. Dan Mosby, one of the elders on Masig Island, played a role in the series. Masig locals were hired as crew and employed to make traditional costumes, mats and decorations for feast scenes. Islanders spoke among themselves in their local dialect, with subtitles provided for the television audience.

While working on the series, the film crew lived in tents, had cold bush showers and had no access to alcohol. Producers rented houses to use as office space and to accommodate the cast.

== Release ==
The series first aired on 5 January 2006 on Special Broadcasting Service (SBS). It was released on DVD on 20 February 2006.

== Awards ==
Year	Award	Category	Result	Ref.
2005	Queensland Premier's Literary Awards	Television Script Award (Sue Smith)	Won	
2005	AWGIE Awards	Best Original Television Miniseries (John Alsop)	Won	
2006	Australian Film Institute Awards	Best Telefeature or Miniseries	Won	
2006	Australian Film Institute Awards	Best Television Screenplay (Sue Smith – episode 5: "Blue Hawaii")	Won	
2006	Australian Film Institute Awards	Best Lead Actress in a Television Drama (Susie Porter)	Won	
2006	Australian Film Institute Awards	Best Supporting Actor in a Television Drama (Aaron Fa'aoso)	Nominated	
2006	Australasian Performing Right Association Awards	Best Soundtrack Album	Won	
2007	Logie Awards	Most Outstanding Actress in a Drama Series (Susie Porter)	Won	
2007	Logie Awards	Most Outstanding Drama Series, Miniseries or Telemovie	Nominated	
2007	Logie Awards	Most Outstanding New Talent (Aaron Fa'aoso)	Nominated	

== See also ==
- List of Australian television series
