= Amy Mathews =

Australian actress (born 1979)

- Born: 29 March 1979 (age 47); Melbourne, Victoria, Australia
- Occupation: Actress
- Years active: 2001–present
- Known for: Home and Away
- Awards: Logie Award for Most Popular New Female Talent (2007)
- Website: Official site

Amy Mathews (born 29 March 1979) is an Australian television, film and theatre actress. She is best known for her role as Rachel Armstrong in Australian soap opera Home and Away.

== Early life ==
Mathews was born in Melbourne, Victoria, but has spent most of her life in Sydney. She was offered a scholarship at The University of the Arts in Philadelphia, Pennsylvania, US, which she completed. She then enrolled in and completed a full time acting course at Actors Centre Australia in Sydney, where she met fellow Home and Away actor Jon Sivewright, who plays Tony Holden, her husband on the show. Before landing her full time role on Home and Away, Mathews waited tables to pay the bills between acting jobs.

== Career ==
Mathews became involved with the Bell Shakespeare Company. She performed as part of the "Actors at Work" program, touring high schools in Australia and Singapore. Her passion for theatre, saw her feature in a 2003 production of Cigarettes and Chocolate and Other Hang Ups. Her other early theatre credits include Tracked, Push Up 1-3, Chicom, Orange Flower Water and Transparency.

Mathews made her on-screen acting debut in 2001, when she had a guest appearance in the short-lived television series Head Start. Following this, she landed roles in several other television series including Always Greener, Blue Heelers, Love Bytes, All Saints and the British series Jeopardy.

Mathews then played the role of doctor and psychiatrist Rachel Armstrong on long-running soap opera Home and Away, from the first episode of the 2006 season until 2010 when she departed the show to pursue new projects. The role of Rachel won Mathews the Logie Award for Most Popular New Female Talent in 2007.

Following Home and Away, Mathews made guest appearances in Packed to the Rafters, Rescue: Special Ops and Crownies, the latter starring her former Home and Away co-stars Todd Lasance and Indiana Evans. In 2007, Mathews starred in the Australian film Gabriel.

In August 2023, Mathews joined the cast of the courtroom drama series, The Twelve for its second season, in the role of Sasha Price. Her most recently screen appearance was in a 2025 episode of NCIS: Sydney, once again opposite Todd Lasance.

Mathews' other theatre credits include Macbeth (2011–2012), The Taming of the Shrew (2011–2012), The Tempest (2012–2013), The Comedy of Errors (2012–2013) and Othello (2013) with Sport for Jove. She appeared in Richard III (2014) and The Anzac Project (2015) for the Ensemble Theatre. She also performed in Coma Land (2017), Toast (2017), Summer of the Seventeenth Doll (2018/2020) and Water (2019) for Black Swan Theatre Company winning a Blue Room Award for Toast and a Performing Arts WA Award for Summer of the Seventeenth Doll. In 2024 and 2025, she has appeared in August: Osage County, for Black Swan.

Mathews has also starred in TV commercials. She has an interest in writing and directing, runs her own blog and studies surface design.

== Filmography ==
=== Film ===
Year	Title	Role	Notes
2007	Gabriel	Maggie	Feature film
2020	I Met a Girl	Senior Constable Harrison	Feature film
2026	Thrash	Rachel Olsen	Feature film

=== Television ===
Year	Title	Role	Notes
2001	Head Start	Louise	Season 1, 1 episode
2002	Always Greener	T'ree	Season 2, 1 episode
2003	All Saints	Mary Cowper	Season 6, 1 episode
2003	Jeopardy	Constable Tucker	Season 2, 2 episodes
2004	Love Bytes	Mel	Season 1, 4 episodes
2004	Blue Heelers	Tahnya West	Season 11, 1 episode
2005	All Saints	Cassie Anderson	Season 8, 1 episode
2006–2010	Home and Away	Rachel Armstrong	Seasons 19–23, 331 episodes
2010	Packed to the Rafters	Erin Moore	Season 3, 2 episodes
2011	Rescue: Special Ops	Claire Newell	Season 3, 2 episodes
2011	Crownies	Vanessa Kenay	Season 1, 1 episode
2014	A Place to Call Home	Amy Polson	Season 2, 7 episodes
2020	The Heights	Rima	Season 2, 1 episode
2023	The Claremont Murders	Michelle Bowman	Miniseries, 2 episodes
2024	The Twelve	Sasha Price	8 episodes
2025	NCIS: Sydney	Heather	1 episode

== Theatre ==
Year	Title	Role	Notes
2003	Cigarettes and Chocolate and Other Hang Ups	Gemma	Darlinghurst Theatre, Sydney
2003	Tracked	Rose	Old Fitzroy Theatre, Sydney
2005	Push Up 1-3	Sabine	
2010	Chicom	Grunt 3	New Theatre, Sydney with Brand Spanking New
2011	Orange Flower Water	Cathy Calhoun	Darlinghurst Theatre, Sydney
2011	Transparency	Jessica	Seymour Centre, Sydney & Riverside Theatre Parramatta
2011; 2012	Macbeth	Lady Macbeth	Bella Vista Farm, Everglades, Leura with Sport for Jove
2011; 2012	The Taming of the Shrew	Vincentia	Bella Vista Farm, Everglades, Leura, Norman Lindsay Gallery and Museum with Sport for Jove
2012; 2013	The Tempest	Alonsa	Bella Vista Farm, Everglades, Leura with Sport for Jove
2012; 2013	The Comedy of Errors	Adriana	Bella Vista Farm, Everglades, Leura with Sport for Jove
2013	Othello	Bianca / Duchess / Second Gentleman	Seymour Centre, Sydney with Sport for Jove
2014	Richard III	Anne Neville	Ensemble Theatre, Sydney
2015	The Anzac Project: Dear Mum and Dad / Light Begins to Fade		Ensemble Theatre, Sydney
2017	Coma Land	Jinny	Studio Underground, Perth with Black Swan Theatre Company
2017	Toast	Alex	Black Swan Theatre Company
2018; 2020	Summer of the Seventeenth Doll	Olive Leech	Heath Ledger Theatre, Perth, Online with Black Swan Theatre Company
2019	Water	Gemma / Nurse	Studio Underground, Perth with Black Swan Theatre Company
2021	Bite the Hand	Dale	Subiaco Arts Centre, Perth with Last Great Hunt
2024; 2025	August: Osage County	Ivy Weston	Belvoir St Theatre, Sydney, Heath Ledger Theatre, Perth with Black Swan Theatre Company

== Awards ==
Year	Work	Award	Category	Result
2007	Home and Away	Logie Awards	Logie Award for Most Popular New Female Talent	Won
2017	Toast	Blue Room Awards	Best Performance	Won
2018	Summer of the Seventeenth Doll	Performing Arts WA Awards	Best Actor in a Mainstage Production (Female)	Won
