= Teo Gebert =

Australian actor (born 1974)

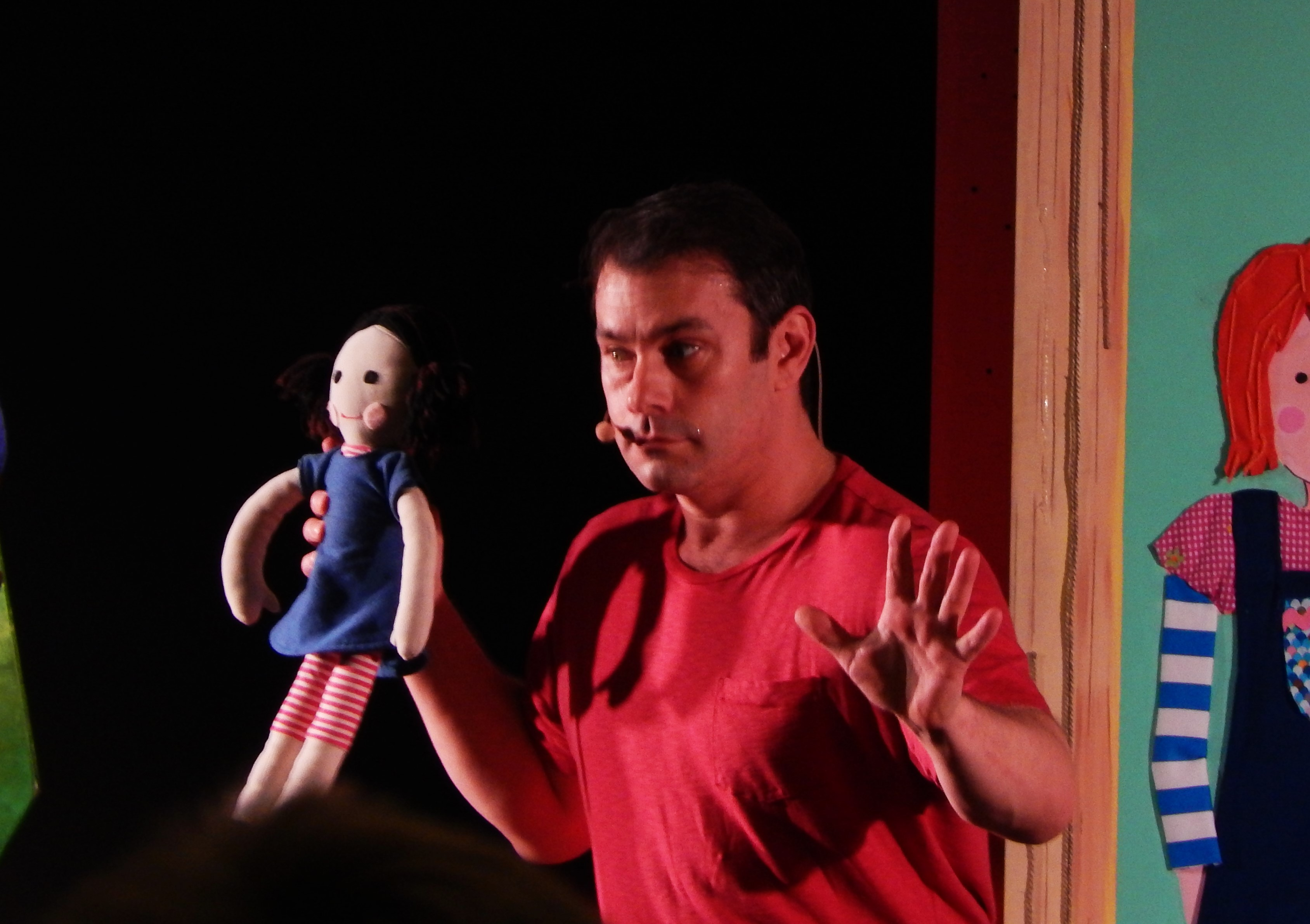
- Gebert in 2015
- Born: 2 September 1974 (age 51); Australia
- Occupation: Actor
- Known for: Fatal Bond (1992); The Boys (1998); Crooked Business (2008); Play School (2004–present); Underbelly: A Tale of Two Cities (2009); Home and Away (2010)
- Family: Reg Livermore (uncle)

Teo Gebert (born 2 September 1974) is an Australian actor who has appeared in numerous film, television and theatre roles, best known as a regular presenter of Play School.

== Early life ==
Gebert grew up in a creative family with a theatrical background: "...my father is a musician, my mother an actor, my uncle an actor, my grandfather ran theatres, and my grandmother had dreams of being a ballerina when she was a little girl." His mother Helen Livermore is Reg Livermore's sister and his father, Bobby is a jazz musician.

After graduating from high school, Gebert trained as an actor at Sydney's Ensemble Theatre under Hayes Gordon, The Atlantic Theatre Company in New York and the Australian Theatre for Young People (ATYP).

== Career ==
=== Theatre ===
Gebert made his stage debut in Reg Livermore's musical Big Sister in 1990.

=== Film ===
Gebert made his film debut in 1992 Australian erotic thriller Fatal Bond alongside Linda Blair and appeared in the 1993 American action film Sniper opposite Tom Berenger.

He played lead roles in the Australian indie films Square One (1997) and The Venus Factory and played support in the drama The Boys. In 1998 he began collaborating with director Paul Middleditch, playing a Nazi in the 1998 film Terra Nova, and in 2001 they wrote and collaborated on the arthouse film A Cold Summer.

Gebert has also appeared in Under the Radar (2004), Safety in Numbers and starred as Elmo in the 2008 gangster comedy Crooked Business. He played a demented prison guard in the 2017 film Emporium.

=== Television ===
In 2000, Gebert played the regular role of Skeez Goivanelli in 35 episodes of Above the Law. He played the recurring roles of Laurie Prendergast in Underbelly: A Tale of Two Cities (the 2009 second season of the crime drama series Underbelly), and Dr Daniel Lovallo on long-running soap opera Home and Away in 2010.

He has also made numerous guest appearances in series such as Family and Friends, G.P., The Feds, Murder Call, Wildside, Stingers, Farscape, Love Bytes, Two Twisted, and The Cut.

He has also been a regular presenter for over twenty years on the long-running children's series Play School since 2004, and in 2012 appeared in a spin-off show called Little Ted's Big Adventures. He has appeared in two seasons of the comedy web series Avalon Now.

== Personal life ==
At the age of 26, Gebert had a daughter, Lily-Rose, with his then-partner. She died at just four days old, due to suffering breathing difficulties during birth. He spoke about the tragedy, while serving as an ambassador for Red Nose Day, a fundraising event that helps reduce infant deaths and support grieving families.

In 2017, Gebert was living in Bondi together with his partner Jane Wallace, daughter Harriet, and two sons, Roy and Charlie.

== Theatre ==
Year	Title	Roles	Notes
1990	Big Sister – A Larrikin's Opera		Riverside Theatres Parramatta
1992	The Trackers of Oxyrhynchus		Wharf Theatre, Sydney with STC
1993	The Heartbreak Kid		Ensemble Theatre, Sydney
1994	Mixed Emotions		Ensemble Theatre, Sydney
1994	Waiting Rooms		Ensemble Theatre, Sydney
1995	The Quartet from Rigoletto		Q Theatre, Penrith, Ensemble Theatre, Sydney
1995	Blackrock	Scott	Wharf Theatre, Sydney with STC
1995	The Splendids	Bravo	Belvoir St Theatre, Sydney
1996	The Life of Galileo	Little Monk	Sydney Opera House
2001	Men of Honour	Lord Southhampton	Ensemble Theatre, Sydney
2005	Lawrence & Holloman	Lawrence	Darlinghurst Theatre, Sydney
2006–2007	Play School	Co-Lead	Live Kids Promotions
2009	Absurd Person Singular	Sidney Hopcroft	Ensemble Theatre, Sydney
2015	Men of Letters		

== Filmography ==
=== Film ===
Year	Title	Roles	Notes
1992	Fatal Bond	Shane Boon	
1993	Sniper	Ripoly's friend	
1995	Capital V for Virtue		Short film
1997	Square One	Billy T	
1998	The Boys	Constable Zammit	
1998	Terra Nova	Warren	
1998	The Venus Factory	Duncan Riley	
2003	A Cold Summer	Bobby	
2004	Under the Radar	Ash	
2006	Safety in Numbers	Matt	
2006	The Game	Marcus	Short film
2008	Crooked Business	Elmo	
2011	Sniper: Reloaded		Direct-to-video film
2017	Emporium	Jimmy	

=== Television ===
Year	Title	Roles	Notes
1990	Family and Friends	Jak	
1991; 1992	G.P.	Shane	Season 3 & 4, 2 episodes
1995	The Feds	Jak Waterman	Miniseries, season 2, episode 3: "Deception"
1997	Murder Call	Simon Kristov	Season 1, episode 4: "Dead Clean"
1998	Wildside	Tony Montano	Season 1, episode 14
1998	Water Rats	Les	Season 3, 2 episodes
1999	Stingers	Morrison	Season 2. episode 7: "Playing with the Celibate Dead"
2000	Above the Law	Skeez Giovanelli	Seasons 1–2, 35 episodes
2002	Farscape	Weldon	Season 4, 1 episode
2004	Love Bytes	Joe	Miniseries, 3 episodes
2004–present	Play School	Presenter	
2005	Tracey McBean	Lee (voice)	Animated series, season 2, 1 episode
2006	Two Twisted	Tate	Episode 6: "A Date with Doctor D"
2009	The Cut	Brian, the Wicketkeeper	Miniseries, episode 3: "Picking the Seam"
2009	Chandon Pictures	Bruiser	Season 2, episode 6: "Pack"
2009	Underbelly: A Tale of Two Cities	Laurie Prendergast	Miniseries, 6 episodes
2010	Home and Away	Dr Daniel Lovallo	6 episodes
2012	Little Ted's Big Adventure	Presenter	
2015–2016	Avalon Now	Brice Waters	Web series, seasons 1–2

== Awards and nominations ==
Year	Nominated work	Award	Category	Result
2017	Square One	St Kilda Film Festival	Best Actor (Special Commendation)	Won
