= Forest Oak =

Forest Oak may refer to:

- A common name for the Australian tree Allocasuarina torulosa
- A historical name for Gaithersburg, Maryland, United States
- Forest Oak Middle School, a middle school in Gaithersburg, Maryland, see Montgomery County Public Schools
- A middle school located in Fort Worth, Texas
