= Susan Prior =

Australian actress (active 1982– )

- Education: NIDA (1991)
- Occupation: Actor
- Years active: 1982–present

Susan Prior is an Australian actress, who has worked extensively in film, television and theatre.

== Early life and education ==
Prior attended a high school that specialised in music, where she took an interest in singing and playing the cello, as well as being heavily involved in sports. She was also chosen for the Student Representative Committee. She subsequently participated in dance with the Australian Dance Theatre 's youth group Mummy 's Little Darlings, including performing at the Adelaide Festival.

Prior travelled from Adelaide to Sydney to audition for National Institute of Dramatic Art in Sydney and was accepted into the school, graduating in 1991.

== Career ==
Prior began her acting career on stage. After performing in productions with Belvoir Theatre Company and Griffin Theatre Company from 1992, she played Tegwyn in an Australian touring production of That Eye, the Sky, directed by Richard Roxburgh from 1994 to 1995.

Prior's first onscreen appearance was in a small part alongside Toni Collette, in 1994 comedy film Muriel's Wedding. She followed this with roles in 1996 comedy-drama Idiot Box with Ben Mendelsohn, 1997 action film Heaven's Burning with Russell Crowe and 1998 drama film Praise.

Prior's performance as Lizzie in a 1997 Griffin Theatre Company production of Wolf Lullaby earned her a Best Actress nomination at the Green Room Awards. Playing Carla in an SBW staging of Sweet Road saw her win an award for Outstanding Performance at the Norman Kessell Memorial Awards in 2001.

In 2000, Prior appeared in the film A Wreck A Tangle with Damian Walshe-Howling. In 2003, she co-wrote and starred in the film A Cold Summer, seeing her nominated for Best Supporting Actress at the Film Critics' Circle Awards. She then landed a recurring guest role in medical drama All Saints in 2005, playing psychotic stalker Beth Chandler, who fixates on Vincent Hughes (Christopher Gabardi), before kidnapping Cate McMasters (Alexandra Davies). In 2006, she appeared in the comedy thriller film Suburban Mayhem, with Michael Dorman and Anthony Hayes.

In 2007, Prior starred in short film The Saviour which was nominated for Best Live Action Short Film at the Academy Awards. That same year, she performed in a Sydney Theatre Company production of Riflemind at The Wharf, directed by Philip Seymour Hoffman which earned her a Best Supporting Actress nomination at the 2008 Helpmann Awards.

Prior played Alicia Henry in David Michôd's 2010 crime drama feature Animal Kingdom, alongside Ben Mendelsohn, Guy Pearce, Joel Edgerton and Jacki Weaver. In 2012, she played opposite Ryan Kwanten and Sarah Snook in comedy drama film Not Suitable for Children, and also had a recurring guest role in long-running soap opera Home and Away, playing the role of Margaret Henderson. That same year, she also landed the recurring role of Yvonne Hennessey in drama series Puberty Blues, the series reimagining of the 1981 film of the same name. Her portrayal saw her nominated for an AACTA Award for Best Guest or Supporting Actress in a Television Drama.

Prior's performance as Electra in a 2013 production of Small and Tired for Belvoir won her a Sydney Theatre Award for Best Actress in a Supporting Role. She was then cast in another Michôd feature film, the 2014 dystopian western drama The Rover, with Guy Pearce and Robert Pattinson. Her performance earned her an AACTA Award for Best Actress in a Supporting Role.

After playing Sasha, the wife of Richard Roxburgh 's Mikhail in a production of The Present for Sydney Theatre Company in 2015, Prior made her Broadway debut in the same production at the Barrymore Theatre. She then appeared opposite Angourie Rice, Toni Collette and Hugo Weaving in 2017 mystery drama film Jasper Jones, in the role of Gwyn Wishart, before playing head teacher, Ms Lee Issen in 2018 film Book Week, and Norma Gowland in docudrama film Riot, with Damon Herriman, Jessica De Gouw and Xavier Samuel.

In 2021, Prior landed a role in ABC comedy series Aftertaste, playing sister Denise, sister of the main character, celebrity chef Easton West (Erik Thomson). The series also starred Rachel Griffiths. In early 2022, Prior played one of the lead roles, Martha, in a State Theatre Company South Australia production of Edward Albee's Who's Afraid of Virginia Woolf?, to acclaim by critics.

In 2024, Prior played Tish in comedy musical film The Deb, with Rebel Wilson. The following year, she appeared in Foxtel comedy-drama series The Last Anniversary, based on Liane Moriarty's book of the same name. She played the role of Margie, alongside Teresa Palmer, Miranda Richardson and Danielle Macdonald.

Prior is set to appear in the upcoming biopic Fenech – The Jeff Fenech Story in the role of boxer Jeff Fenech's mother, Mary.

== Filmography ==
=== Film ===
Year	Title	Role	Notes	Ref
1994	Muriel's Wedding	Girl at Wedding	Feature film	
1996	Idiot Box	Luce	Feature film	
1997	Heaven's Burning	Sharon	Feature film	
1997	Sneak Preview		Short film	
1998	Praise	Sophie	Feature film	
1998	War Story	Mother	Short film	
1999	Doctor By Day	Kay	Short film	
2000	A Wreck A Tangle	Eleanor	Feature film	
2002	Little Blue	Mum	Short film	
2003	A Cold Summer	Phaedra	Feature film	
2005	A Divided Heart	Millie Vickery	Feature film	
2005	Monster	Mother	Short film	
2005	The Saviour	Carmel	Short film	
2005	Still Time	Sue	Short film	
2006	Suburban Mayhem	Christine Andretti	Feature film	
2007	The Uncertainty Principal	Sue	Short film	
2007	Nothing Lasts Forever	Woman	Short film	
2008	The View from Greenhaven	Kate	Feature film	
2010	Animal Kingdom	Alicia Henry	Feature film	
2011	The Engagement	International Commission for Missing Persons	Short film	
2012	Not Suitable for Children	Marcie	Feature film	
2012	Careless Love	Lee	Feature film	
2013	The Twin	Annie / Sarah	Short film	
2013	My Mother Her Daughter	Susan	Short film	
2014	The Orchard	Rachel	Short film	
2014	The Rover	Dorothy Peeples	Feature film	
2014	Snowblind	Gene	Short film	
2014	Handyman	Melinda	Short film	
2015	Second Hand	Gabby	Short film	
2015	Reg Makes Contact	Susan	Short film	
2015	Bunny New Girl	Alice Dunn	Short film	
2017	Jasper Jones	Gwyn Wishart	Feature film	
2018	Book Week	Lee Issen	Feature film	
2018	The Second	The Detective	Short film	
2018	Riot	Norma Gowland	TV movie	
2020	Cube Season	Mirren Cube (voice)	Animated short film	
2020	Groundhog Night	Cheryl	Short film	
2020	Mukbang	Sandra	Short film	
2021	Chopin's Piano	George Sand	Feature film	
2021	The Gathering	Gale	Short film	
2021	Ascendant	Barbara Wolf	Feature film	
2024	The Deb	Tish	Feature film	
2024	Just a Farmer	Kathryn		
TBA	Fenech – The Jeff Fenech Story	Mary Fenech	Feature film	
TBA	Delia	The Woman in Green	Short film; Post-production	

=== Television ===
Year	Title	Role	Notes	Ref
1995	G.P.	Linda Swanson	1 episode	
1996	Police Rescue	Debra	1 episode	
1996	House Gang	Chris	1 episode	
2000	Water Rats	Rosie Callaghan	2 episodes	
2002	Farscape	Kirayh	1 episode	
2002	Young Lions	Christine Malouf	1 episode	
2005	All Saints	Beth Chandler	15 episodes	
2006	Two Twisted	Nurse Hughes	Anthology series, 1 episode	
2012	Rake	Barbara	1 episode	
2012	Home and Away	Margaret Henderson	6 episodes	
2012–2014	Puberty Blues	Yvonne Hennessey	17 episodes	
2015	Love Child	Geraldine Donnelly	1 episode	
2017	Doctor Doctor	Minnie	3 episodes	
2017	Top of the Lake	Beccy	1 episode	
2018	Fighting Season	Dr. Linda	1 episode	
2018	Bite Club	Tricia	1 episode	
2018	Safe Harbour	Renee	3 episodes	
2019	The Commons	Mayor Lena Gordon	1 episode	
2019	The Other Guy	Sharon	1 episode	
2019	Frayed	Ruth	2 episodes	
2019	Glitch	Anna Donohue	3 episodes	
2019	Les Norton	Chenille	4 episodes	
2019	Jade of Death	Donna	2 episodes	
2020	The Gloaming	Counsellor Susan Kelly	2 episodes	
2021	The Moth Effect	Staff Member	1 episode	
2021–2022	Aftertaste	Denise West	12 episodes	
2023	Zombie Therapy		Web series	
2024	Bump	Mara	1 episode	
2025	The Last Anniversary	Margie	6 episodes	

== Theatre ==
Year	Title	Role	Notes	Ref.
1982	Fatal Johnny		Royalty Theatre, Adelaide with Adelaide Festival of Arts	
1991	Merrily We Roll Along		NIDA, Sydney	
1991	Tales from the Decameron / Serious Money		NIDA, Sydney	
1992	The Will		Harold Park Hotel, Sydney with Lounge Acts	
1992	Last of the Earl Grey / A Surprise for Miffy		Belvoir, Sydney with Missing Link Productions	
1992	Little Ragged Blossom / More About Cuddlepot and Snugglepie		Stables Theatre, Sydney with Griffin Theatre Co	
1992	Like Whiskey on the Breath of a Drunk You Love / The Flaw / Spumante Romantica		Stables Theatre, Sydney with Griffin Theatre Co	
1992	Shorts at the Stables		Stables Theatre, Sydney with Griffin Theatre Co	
1992	Fractured Intimacies		Stables Theatre, Sydney with Griffin Theatre Co	
1992	Water Daughter / Glycerine Tears / The White Room		Stables Theatre, Sydney with Griffin Theatre Co	
1993	The Gentleman's New Clothes (aka Le Bourgeois Gentilhomme)		Belvoir, Sydney	
1993	The Pitchfork Disney		Belvoir, Sydney	
1994–1995	That Eye, the Sky	Tegwyn	Australian tour	
1995	Sydney Stories 1: The Ninth Wonder / The Price of Prayer / The Last Days of a Famous Mime / Family Running for Mr. Whippy		Wharf Theatre, Sydney with STC	
1995	The Jungle		Wharf Theatre, Sydney with STC	
1995–1997	Who 's Afraid of Virginia Woolf?	Honey	Australian tour with STC	
1997	Wolf Lullaby	Lizzie	Malthouse Theatre, Melbourne with Griffin Theatre Co	
1998	Love for Love		Sydney Opera House with STC	
1998	The Surgeon of Honour	Mencia	St Stephen's Church, Sydney with STC	
1998	La Dispute	Hermaine	St Stephen's Church, Sydney with STC	
1999	Laughter on the 23rd Floor		Sydney Opera House with Ensemble Theatre	
2000	The Ecstatic Bible		Scott Theatre, Adelaide for Adelaide Festival of Arts	
2000	Sweet Road	Carla	SBW Theatre, Sydney with Ensemble Theatre	
2001	King Lear	The Fool / Cordelia	STC	
2002	The Soldiers Tale	The Devil	Australian Chamber Orchestra	
2002–2003	Alone it Stands	Various roles	NSW/ACT tour	
2003	The Cavalcaders	Nuala	Ensemble Theatre, Sydney with O'Punksky's Theatre Co	
2004	Dreaming Transportation	Singer	Sydney Opera House with Performing Lines	
2005	Hurlyburly	Bonnie	Stables Theatre, Sydney with Griffin Stablemates	
2005	Arabian Night	Franziska	NIDA Theatre, Sydney	
2005	Top Shorts	God	Old Fitzroy Theatre, Sydney	
2006	Constance Drinkwater & the Final Days of Somerset	Constance Drinkwater	Stables Theatre, Sydney with Tamarama Rock Surfers	
2007	Riflemind	Lynn	Wharf Theatre, Sydney with STC	
2008	Summer of the Seventeenth Doll	Blanche Dubois	STC	
2008–2009	Venus and Adonis	Venus	AUS/NZ tour with Bell Shakespeare & STC	
2009	The Web	Ivy	Playhouse, Perth, Butter Factory Theatre, Wodonga with Black Swan Theatre Co	
2010	Our Town	Mrs. Gibbs	Sydney Opera House with STC	
2010	King Lear	Cordelia	Australian tour with Bell Shakespeare	
2011	The Libertine	Elizabeth Malet	Darlinghurst Theatre with Sport for Jove	
2013	Small and Tired	Electra	Belvoir, Sydney	
2014	Is This Thing On?	Brianna	Belvoir, Sydney	
2015	Suddenly Last Summer	Mrs Grace Holly	Sydney Opera House with STC	
2015	Death and the Maiden	Paulina Salaa	Wharf Theatre, Sydney with STC & MTC	
2015; 2017	The Present	Sasha	Sydney Theatre with STC & Barrymore Theatre, Broadway	
2016	A Midsummer Night 's Dream	Peter Quince / Fairy / Singer	Sydney Opera House with STC	
2016	The Distance	Bea	Southbank Theatre, Melbourne with MTC	
2016	Kin (staged reading)	Mrs Mignon Bloom	STC	
2018	Bliss	Alice Dalton	Belvoir, Sydney, Malthouse Theatre, Melbourne	
2020	Dev		Online, Australia	
2020	Baroness Nihil Zalay		Online	
2022	Who 's Afraid of Virginia Woolf?	Martha	Dunstan Playhouse, Adelaide with STCSA	
2022	Chalkface	Denise Hart	Sydney Opera House, Dunstan Playhouse, Adelaide with STC & STCSA	
2024	The Incorrigibles	Mog Murphy	Kings Cross Theatre, Sydney	

== Awards and nominations ==
Year	Nominated work	Award	Category	Result	Ref.
1998	Wolf Lullaby	Green Room Awards	Best Female Actor in a Leading Role	Nominated	
2001	Sweet Road	Norman Kessell Memorial Awards	Outstanding Performance	Won	
2003	A Cold Summer	Film Critics ' Circle Awards	Best Supporting Actress	Nominated	
2008	Riflemind	Helpmann Awards	Best Supporting Actress	Nominated	
2012	Puberty Blues (episode 4)	AACTA Awards	Best Guest or Supporting Actress	Nominated	
2013	Small and Tired	Sydney Theatre Awards	Best Actress in Supporting Role in a Mainstage Production	Won	
2014	Small and Tired	Helpmann Awards	Best Actress in Supporting Role	Nominated	
2014	The Rover	AACTA Awards	Best Supporting Actress	Won	
2015	The Rover	Film Critics Circle of Australia Awards	Best Actress in Supporting Role	Nominated	
2015	The Present	Sydney Theatre Awards	Best Actress in a Supporting Role in Mainstage Production	Nominated	
	Making Love to the Scarecrow	Searchlight Griffin Theatre Prize		Won	
