= Fatal Bond =

- Film poster
- Directed by: Vince Monton
- Written by: Phillip Avalon
- Produced by: Phillip Avalon
- Starring: Linda Blair; Jerome Ehlers; Stephen Leeder; Donal Gibson
- Cinematography: Ray Henman
- Edited by: Ted Otton
- Music by: Art Phillips
- Production companies: Avalon Films; Australian Film Finance Corporation Pty Ltd
- Distributed by: Hoyts
- Release date: March 5, 1992
- Running time: 89 minutes
- Country: Australia
- Language: English
- Budget: A$3 million or $1.2 million
- Box office: A$13,871 (Australia)

Fatal Bond is a 1992 Australia erotic thriller film, directed by Vince Monton, starring Linda Blair and Jerome Ehlers. It was filmed in the Northern Beaches area of Sydney, New South Wales, including Narrabeen Caravan Park.

== Plot ==
Leonie Stevens is a hairdresser who dates the charming Joe Martinez who may or may not be a serial killer.

== Cast ==
- Linda Blair as Leonie Stevens
- Jerome Ehlers as Joe Martinez
- Stephen Leeder as Anthony Boon
- Donal Gibson as Rocky Borgetta
- Joe Bugner as Claw Miller
- Caz Lederman as Detective Chenko
- Teo Gebert as Shane Boon
- Penny Pederson as Bree Boon
- Roger Ward as Detective Greaves
- Ross Newton as John Harding
- Kevin Johnson as himself
- Caroline Beck as Jenny
- Jan Adele as Mrs Karvan
- Lyndon Harris as Joy Turner
- Ken Snodgrass as Sgt. Taylor
- Peter Browne as Caravan Man
- Bob Barrett as Fisherman Bob
- Jim Winshuttle as Fisherman
- Donna Lee as Celia Boon
- Ron Holbrow as Celia's Husband

== Production ==
Avalon was going to cast Russell Crowe as a villain but Universal then contacted them and said they were interested in buying the film if Donal Gibson, Mel's brother, was cast. Donal Gibson got the role.

== Box office ==
Fatal Bond grossed $13,871 at the box office in Australia.

== Reception ==
David Stratton and Paul Harris both gave Fatal Bond zero out of ten in Cinema Papers' critics survey in their October 1992 edition. Scott Murray later wrote in his Cinema Papers review "While Fatal Bond has many glaring flaws, not the least some poor performances (Jerome Ehlers’ notably excepted) and rather workmanlike direction, it is nowhere near as unwatchable as many have claimed." When released on video The Sydney Morning Herald's Paul Pottinger said "This cheap and crummy effort from the offices of Phil Avalon consists of random stock elements thrown at the screen in the hope that some them will stick. Some do, however, mostly the ambling and derivative yarn, the desperately ordinary acting from a cast of third division hacks and the spectacularly uninspired direction." Australian Screen curator Richard Kuipers calls it "a capable 'B’ movie" that is "a respectable entry in the annals of Aussie road thrillers."

== See also ==
- Cinema of Australia
