= Square One (film) =

- Directed by: Robert Herbert
- Written by: Robert Herbert; Alex Smythe
- Produced by: Sophie Jackson
- Starring: Teo Gebert; Aaron Jeffery
- Cinematography: Tristan Milani
- Edited by: Nick Meyers
- Production company: Arcadia Pictures
- Release date: 1997
- Running time: 55 minutes
- Country: Australia
- Language: English
- Box office: A$2,160 (Australia)

Square One is a 1997 Australian film directed by Robert Herbert.

== Plot ==
Vicky and Billy T become involved in the mod subculture.

== Cast ==
- Teo Gebert as Billy T
- Aaron Jeffery as Heremy Hostick
- Tara Morice as Margot
- Michaela Noonan as Vicky

== Awards ==
- Best director and best actor at the St Kilda Film Festival in Melbourne
- Silver Spire prize at the San Francisco International Film Festival
- Nominated Best Film 1995 Sydney Film Festival Dendy Awards
