= Love Bytes =

- Genre: Drama
- Created by: Leslie Stewart
- Directed by: Robert Klenner; Brian Grant
- Starring: Abi Tucker; Nathaniel Dean; Teo Gebert; Simon Bossell
- Country of origin: Australia
- Original language: English
- No. of seasons: 1
- No. of episodes: 4

Production
- Running time: 30 minutes
- Production companies: Foxtel; Shine

Original release
- Release: 2 February – 3 February 2004

Love Bytes is an Australian anthology series which premiered on the Fox8 subscription television channel in 2004. The series follows the lives and exploits of people involved in electronic dating. The series also screened on UKTV.

== Episodes and Cast ==
=== Episode 1: Trust Up ===
Bea discovers that Callum, the man she met at a nightclub and slept with, has been hooking up with her best friend Joe, who he met on a gay chat line.

- Abi Tucker as Bea
- Teo Gebert as Joe
- Michael Piccirilli as Callum

=== Episode 2: Cocktales ===
Three women meet a man called "Larry" on an online dating website and arrange to meet him in a bar. One of the women who has been stood up gets to know the barman and goes home with him instead.

- Paul Ashcroft as bartender Troy
- Natalie Saleeba

=== Episode 3: Four Play ===
A yuppie couple decide to join a swingers group.

- Simon Bossell as Ed
- Amy Mathews as Mel

=== Episode 4: Net Nanny ===
John is trying to find love online where he meets Clare, the Net Nanny.

- Nathaniel Dean as John
- Amanda Dougue as Clare
- Alex O'Loughlin as Dave

== Awards ==
Love Bytes was nominated for a Logie Award for Most Outstanding Drama Series at the 2005 Logie Awards.
