= Paul Harris (film critic) =

Australian film critic

Paul Harris, born in 1950 in Melbourne and educated at Assumption College, Kilmore, is a film critic, who appeared on radio stations 3RRR and 3AW.

Known for his knowledge of film, music and theatre, and for his puns and impressions, he has hosted the radio show Filmbuff's Forecast since 1982. For the first ten years he co-anchored with John Flaus. He has directed the St Kilda Short Film Festival since 1999.

He has occasionally acted (Nirvana Street murder, Love and Other Catastrophes) and is a lecturer in the Film and TV course at Swinburne University and also, a lecturer for the Professional Screenwriting course at RMIT.

He is the author of The Film Buff's DVD Companion (Text Publishing).
