= A Cold Summer =

- Directed by: Paul Middleditch
- Starring: Teo Gebert; Susan Prior
- Cinematography: Steve Arnold
- Edited by: Peter Whitmore
- Release date: 2003
- Running time: 86 minutes
- Country: Australia
- Language: English
- Budget: under $500,000
- Box office: A$20,380 (Australia)

A Cold Summer is a 2003 Australian film. The writing of the film was highly collaborative with input from all the actors.

== Plot ==
Bobby, who is living in a car having left his wife, begins a charged sexual relationship with the married Tia. Tia renews a friendship with Phaedra, who has lost a boyfriend to heroin.

== Cast ==
- Teo Gebert as Bobby
- Olivia Pigeot as Tia
- Susan Prior as Phaedra

== Production ==
It was the second feature film from Paul Middleditch, who was one of the leading TV commercial directors in Australia.

Director Paul Middleditch lived with the three main actors for a number of months working on the screenplay. "I wanted to create a work that was a direct response to the emotional state I was in at the time", he says. "I wanted to construct three truthful portraits of people dealing with death in their lives in radically different ways and to create an environment in which they could expose their real lives before the camera".

The film was shot over five days.

== Release ==
The film screened at the Sydney Film Festival and the Melbourne International Film Festival.
