= Olivia Pigeot =

Australian actress

- Occupation: Actress
- Notable work: A Cold Summer

Olivia Pigeot is an Australian actress. For her performance in the film A Cold Summer Pigeot was nominated for the 2004 AFI Award for Best Actress in a Leading Role Other roles include the 2011 TV mini series Paper Giants: The Birth of Cleo and Somersault.
