= Crooked Business =

- Theatrical release poster
- Directed by: Chris Nyst
- Written by: Chris Nyst
- Produced by: Scott Corfield
- Release date: 16 October 2008
- Running time: 95 minutes
- Country: Australia
- Language: English
- Budget: $1 million

Crooked Business is a feature film by Chris Nyst, a criminal lawyer. It is a comedy of errors set in Australia's Gold Coast. It opened in Australia on 15 October 2008.

== Plot ==
The movie stars small-time hustler Elmo, and his best friend 'Stand-Up' Stevie, a used car dealer with questionable ethics. Stevie finds himself in trouble when he sells a counterfeit gold watch to biker Russian Tony. To buy his way out, Stevie agrees to do a job for local hood 'Bondi Bob' McLean. All he has to do is fly to Melbourne to pick up some stolen jewels in a briefcase.

When Stevie and Elmo arrive to collect the briefcase, a gunfight breaks out. The pair escape, but in the confusion, leave with the wrong briefcase - one belonging to Peter Cho, a Chinatown villain with a deadly reputation. The briefcase contains a rare go-fast potion said to turn any average horse into a race winner. The only thing to do is trade off with Cho.

== Cast ==
- Teo Gebert - Elmo
- Anthony Brandon Wong - Peter Cho
- Firass Dirani - Stevie
- Kelly Atkinson - Cher
- Brad McMurray - Big Elvis
- Christopher Naismith - Pierre
- Chris Betts - Bondi Bob
- Bertrand Doeuk - Wang
- Anh Do - Benny Wing
- Jay Laga'aia - Pickaxe
- Hugh Parker - London Mick
- Scott Corfield - Maurice

== Production ==
The movie was produced on a $1 million AU budget and shot entirely on location around Australia's Gold Coast, over five weeks of shooting. Many of the film's extras were friends and clients of Nyst's law firm, working as volunteers. Producer Scott Corfield said the lack of funds required calling in favours "from all over town".

== Box office ==
Crooked Business grossed $27,804 at the box office in Australia.
