= Pearce Family Cemetery =

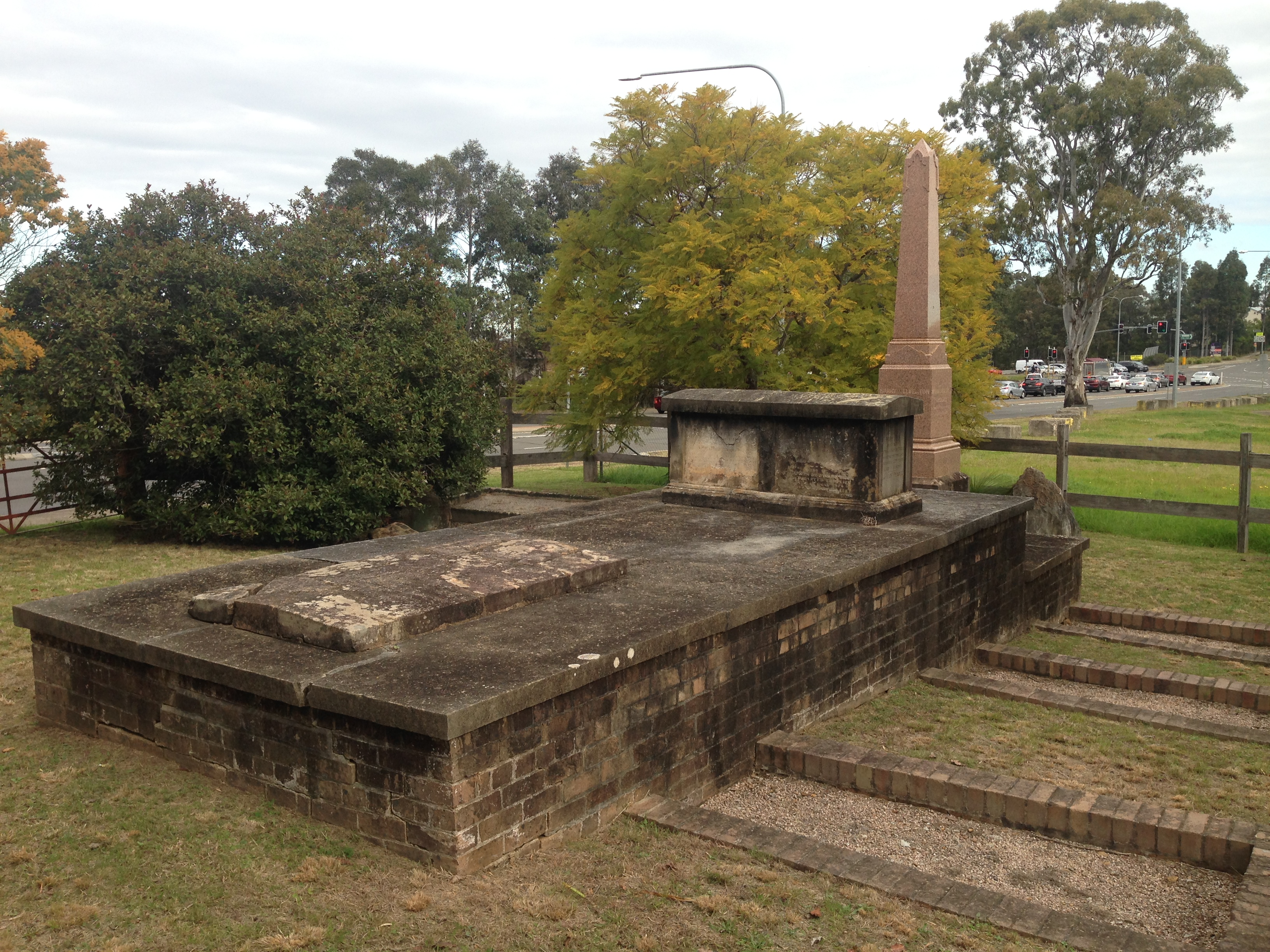
- Graves in Pearce Family Cemetery

- Location within Sydney Location within Australia
- 33°45′26″S 150°57′22″E
- Location: Seven Hills Road, Bella Vista, The Hills Shire, New South Wales, Australia

Site notes
- Owner: Estate of the late M. W. Pearce

New South Wales Heritage Register
- Official name: Pearce Family Cemetery; Pearce Cemetery
- Type: State heritage (complex / group)
- Designated: 2 April 1999
- Reference no.: 593
- Type: Cemetery/Graveyard/Burial Ground
- Category: Cemeteries and Burial Sites

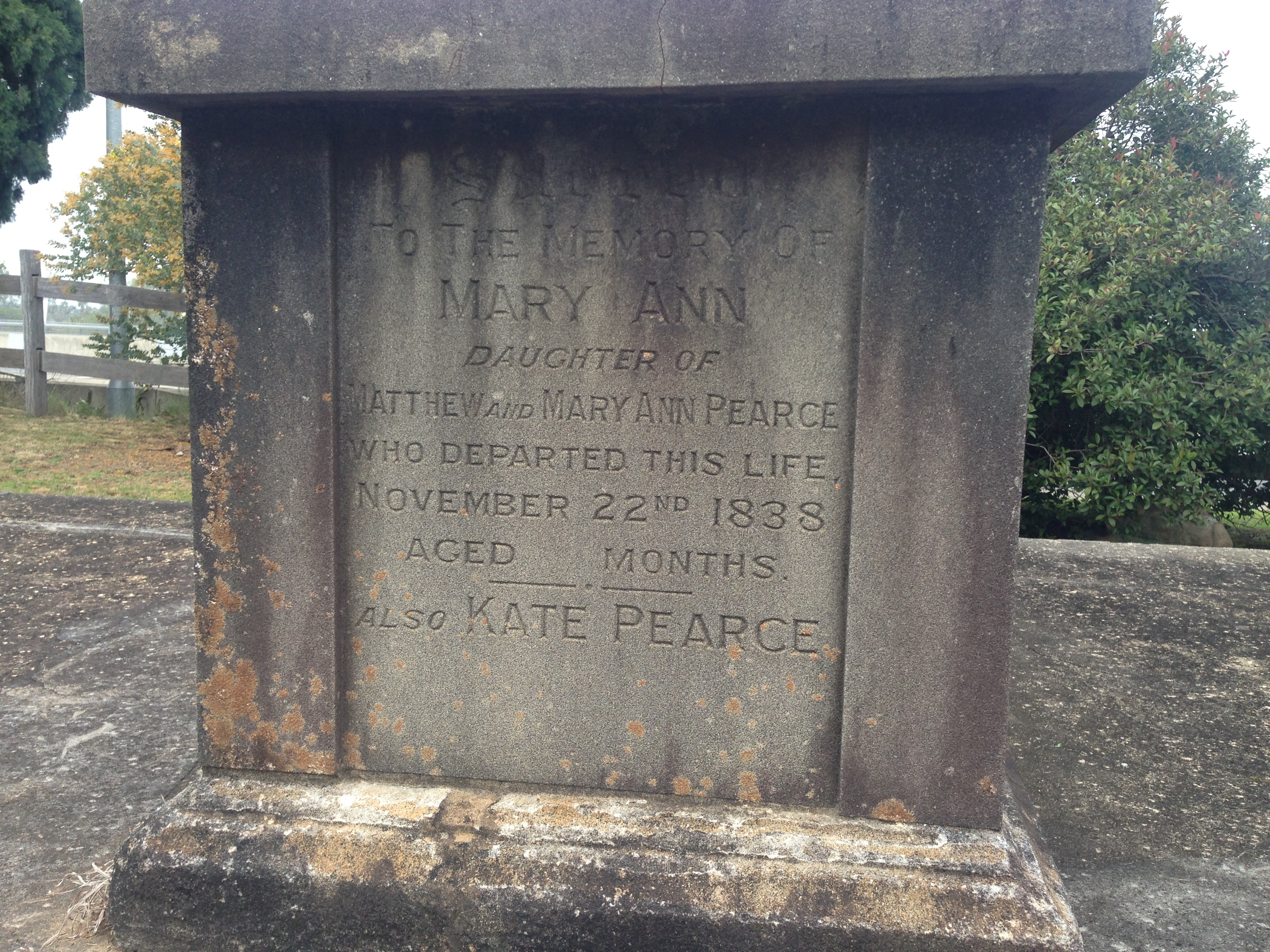
Memorial for Mary Anne Pearce in the Pearce Family cemetery

The Pearce Family Cemetery is a heritage-listed former farming land and now cemetery located at 257 Seven Hills Road, Bella Vista in The Hills Shire local government area of New South Wales, Australia. It is also known as the Pearce Cemetery. The property is privately owned. It was added to the New South Wales State Heritage Register on 2 April 1999.

== History ==
The land on which the cemetery is located consists of, on the east, a small part of Matthew Pearce's grant dated 1795 [Reg. 1 No. 169(3)] (portion 209 of 65 hectares (160 acres)) and a larger part of Matthew Woodward Pearce's grant dated 1835 [Bk. P p. 7] (portion 209 of 16 hectares (40 acres)).

Matthew Pearce arrived as a free settler on the Surprize in 1794 and was granted land that he called King's Langley (from which the nearby suburb takes its name). Pearce was a well-known landholder in the district and was a member of the Grand Jury in Parramatta in 1825.

Ownership of the land on which the cemetery stands, switched branches within the Pearce family. Matthew Pearce died in 1831 and his lands were left to his widow Martha for life, and then to his two sons Matthew Woodward Pearce and William Thomas Pearce. In 1835 the Commissioner of Claims reported that Matthew Woodward Pearce was entitled to the land surrounding and including the cemetery. In a Deed of Partition, Schedule B, [Bk. N No. 588] dated 1838, it was stated that this land was left to William Thomas Pearce. His will leaves the land to his widow Eliza until her death, then to their youngest son Phillip Augustus Pearce.

In 1895 Phillip Augustus Pearce mortgaged the land for A£1,000. The mortgage document does not mention the cemetery, but it clearly includes all of portion 209 and a large part of portion 208 on both sides of Seven Hills Road. He remortgaged the land in 1904 to Henry Dawson of Dulwich Hill. [Book 771 No. 586] The map attached to this mortgage marks the cemetery, but the cemetery is not referred to as an exclusion within the detailed list of lands. The mortgage was discharged in 1906.

In 1905 when Phillip Augustus Pearce initiated proceedings to bring all the land under the Real Property Act, Edward Henry Pearce (of Bella Vista, the second son of William Thomas Pearce) was the trustee. Title of the land surrounding the cemetery was issued to him. [CT Vol. 1960 fol. 52]. The cemetery was specifically excluded and has never been brought under the Real Property Act. Phillip Augustus died in 1919 and according to his death certificate, he is buried in the family cemetery but there is no monumental inscription to be seen.

In 1984 there was a development proposal to resume the cemetery land. In March 1985 Baulkham Hills Shire Council (later renamed The Hills Shire Council) reversed its decision to resume the cemetery land, and a Permanent Conservation Order (PCO) [No. 593] was placed on the cemetery by the Heritage Council. In 1988 there was a proposal for acquisition by the Roads & Traffic Authority for all the land surrounding, but excluding, the cemetery.

The original pioneers Matthew Pearce (died 1831) and his wife Martha (died 1843) have monumental inscriptions in this cemetery as have many of their descendants. However it is not possible to say for certain when the first burial took place on this land. There are monumental inscriptions for three children of Matthew Woodward Pearce – George Henry (died 1847 aged 5 years), another George Henry (also died 1847 aged 5 days) and Matilda Susannah (died 1850 aged 2 years). In 1865 William Thomas Pearce died and was buried at St Bartholomew's, Prospect. His wife Eliza died in 1878, and there are monumental inscriptions for this couple at the cemetery. In 1876 Mary Anne Pearce (wife of Matthew Woodward Pearce and mother of the three children already mentioned) died, and her husband Matthew Woodward Pearce, the (original) landowner died in 1878. His death certificate shows he was buried at St John's Cemetery, Parramatta, and the St John's burial register confirms the couple were buried there. Nonetheless, they are monumental inscriptions to this couple at the family cemetery.

The first documentary proof of a burial is on the death certificate of Henrietta Fletcher (second daughter of William Thomas Pearce) who was buried there in December 1888.

The land has been continually owned by the Pearce family for over two hundred years.

== Description ==
The Pearce Family Cemetery is situated on a rise almost at the highest point of the land on Seven Hills Road North and for most of the 20th century was surrounded by paddocks. It is a small cemetery of 464.5 square metres (5,000 sq ft).

There are no traditional cemetery trees here. The largest tree is a conifer and this is outside the fencing and there are three more conifers inside the fence. There are two Jacarandas, three natives trees and three other small trees.

There is a wooden post-and-rail fence completely surrounding the cemetery, but this is not the original fence, nor is the iron gate original. The posts at the side of the gate are painted, as is the gate. The central feature is the large family vault surmounted by a stone sarcophagus dedicated to those of the Pearce family who died in the 1870s. The adjacent granite obelisk dedicated to members of the Archdall family is a most prominent landmark. There is much conjecture as to whether bodies were moved from St John's, Parramatta to this cemetery, whether just the headstones were moved or whether other headstones were placed here. The vault is clearly large enough to hold twenty coffins. It is approximately 10 by 4 metres (33 ft × 13 ft). There are three single brick-edged rectangles on the western side of the vault. These mark the three separate entrances into the vault. The remaining graves, plaques and headstones are against the fences. These are mainly simple upright sandstone slabs with sandstone edging. Some have concrete on top but they are mostly too overgrown to state this for sure. There are some granite headstones on a sandstone backing. There is one open-book headstone and one white marble headstone with some carving of flowers. There are no footstones. Only on one grave can the name of a monumental mason (Murphy) be seen. There are apparently many more burials in the cemetery than there are markers.

The cemetery is enclosed by a post and rail fence with iron gate and solid wooden gate posts.

=== Condition ===
As at 15 December 1999, the physical condition was fair. There has been natural deterioration of the monuments as well as some vandalism. However the cemetery has been reasonably well maintained by the Pearce family (the Trustees).

=== Modifications and dates ===
Repair to graves and replacement of stolen gates and fencing appear to have been undertaken in the 1990s.

== Heritage listing ==
As at 19 April 2005, a small family burial ground, historically important because it contains the remains of Matthew Pearce, the district's first settler, and the graves of his descendants. The cemetery has associations with the Pearce family, who also owned nearby Bella Vista Farm, Seven Hills. The location of the cemetery on the Old Windsor Road indicates the important role of the road for communications between the local settlers and the rest of the colony, especially the markets for their produce, and of the importance of the family who displayed their genealogical relationships and sense of place in such a publicly prominent mode.

The Pearce Family Cemetery was listed on the New South Wales State Heritage Register on 2 April 1999.

== See also ==
- Bella Vista (homestead)
- History of Sydney
