= Bella Vista (homestead) =

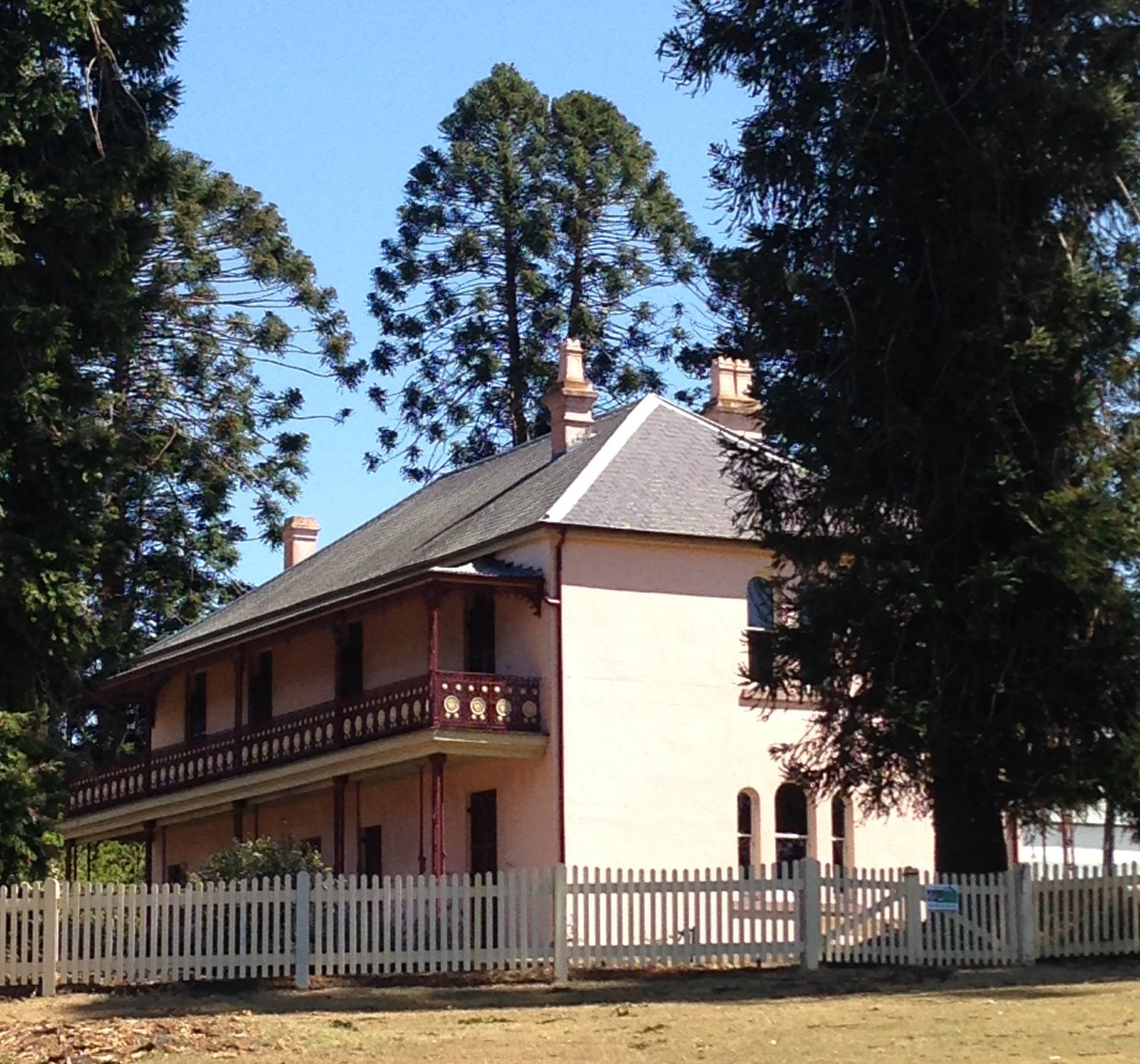
- Bella Vista homestead, in September 2017

- Location within Sydney Location within Australia
- 33°44′25″S 150°57′10″E
- Location: Elizabeth Macarthur Drive, Bella Vista, The Hills Shire, New South Wales, Australia

History
- Built: 1830–1960

Site notes
- Architectural styles: Old Colonial Georgian; Victorian Georgian; Victorian Regency; High Victorian Italianate
- Owner: The Hills Shire Council

New South Wales Heritage Register
- Official name: Bella Vista; Kings Langley; Stock Farm; Seven Hills Farm; Bella Vista Farm
- Type: State heritage (landscape)
- Designated: 2 April 1999
- Reference no.: 754
- Type: Historic Landscape
- Category: Landscape - Cultural

Bella Vista is a heritage-listed residence at Elizabeth Macarthur Drive, Bella Vista, The Hills Shire, New South Wales, Australia. It was built from 1830 to 1960. It is also known as Kings Langley, Stock Farm, Seven Hills Farm and Bella Vista Farm. The property is owned by The Hills Shire Council and was added to the New South Wales State Heritage Register on 2 April 1999.

== History ==
=== Indigenous history ===
Aboriginal sites have been identified at Bella Vista.

=== Ownership and management from 1799 to 1842 ===
Matthew Pearce was the first settler to receive land at Seven Hills, having been granted around 65 hectares (160 acres) in 1794–5. Pearce's property became known as King's Langley. In 1799 a joint grant of 400 hectares (980 acres) was made to Joseph Foveaux and Charles Grimes. Within a month Grimes signed over his share of joint grant to Foveaux. The property was known as Stock Farm and adjoined Pearce's property.

Other smaller grants were made near Foveaux's land later in October 1799 with William Goodhall receiving 110 hectares (270 acres) while 65 hectares (160 acres) was granted to Richard Richardson. It was on Richardson's holding that the Bella Vista farm complex was to evolve.

By September 1801, Richardson had sold his entire grant to a Thomas Jones who sold it just under a year later to the well known Irish emancipist Richard Fitzgerald. Fitzgerald was also to acquire 69 hectares (170 acres) of Goodhall's land.

Having been appointed Acting Lieutenant Governor at Norfolk Island, Foveaux found it necessary to sell his Toongabbie holdings and by December 1801 John and Elizabeth Macarthur had bought up Foveaux's Stock Farm along with all the livestock on the property. Subsequently, Fitzgerald, who acted as the Macarthurs' steward, manager and record keeper during John's absence from the colony, sold his 130 hectares (330 acres) holdings to the Macarthurs. This conglomerate of around 920 hectares (2,270 acres) was to become known as Seven Hills Farm. It was here that Elizabeth Macarthur bred some of the first Merino sheep.

In 1821 the Macarthur's Seven Hills Farm was returned to Crown land in lieu of land at Camden. Fresh grants of portions of the Seven Hills Farm were made almost immediately. James Robertson was granted 200 hectares (500 acres) on which the present-day Bella Vista is situated. Other grantees included Matthew Pearce who was allotted 69 hectares (170 acres) in 1835.

Robertson grazed sheep and cattle on his property but found that orcharding was much more productive. The property was advertised for subdivision in 1838 but was purchased outright to his neighbour, Isabella Acres in September 1838. In 1842 Acres returned home to England which led to the sale of the property to William Pearce.

=== Ownership and management by the Pearce family (1842-1949) ===
Almost nothing is known of developmental works on the property during William Pearce's period of ownership (1842–65), though it seems that the first stage of the Bella Vista homestead was constructed prior to his death in 1865. Edward Pearce inherited the property upon the demise of his father. From this time on, major consolidation, expansion and property improvement were to see the evolution of the Bella Vista farm complex which is left today. Edward Pearce appears to have moved into his inheritance, Robertson Farm. Second storey additions were made to the homestead between the end of 1864 and April 1865. Though mixed farming continued, orchards were the dominant land usage on the property.

By the 1880s Edward Pearce had established himself as one of the most successful orchardists on the central Cumberland Plain. In 1887, Pearce grossed a minimum of A£8,500 for citrus fruit shipped to Melbourne. The same year also saw the homestead refurbished and the construction of the vault at the family's cemetery. Commercial activities included the additional planting of at least 400 fruit trees. Pearce's farming was based on capital and that allowed him to employ at least 30 full-time workers. A substantial number of the workforce were Chinese who had turned to agricultural labour once the goldfields had been exhausted.

The citrus fruit grown found good markets in Sydney, Melbourne and Tasmania. With the establishment of irrigation area along the Murray River during the 1890s and later irrigation developments in South Australia and southern New South Wales, these markets were seriously eroded. The citrus being grown in the newer districts produced the navel orange which were much superior to the common orange variety.

Thus around 1912, when Edward Pearce's son Edward William Charles Archdall ('Toby') Pearce inherited Bella Vista, sheep were reintroduced onto the property. The old packing shed was converted into a shearing shed. Around 1910 a reaper and binder was purchased. A mechanical seed drill was also purchased at the turn of the century, although most cereals were sown by hand. An engine and pump was placed on the large dam in order to water the vegetable garden. Previous to this Jimmy the Chinese gardener had used a yoke and buckets. Having diversified their activities, the Pearces continued to profit from Bella Vista. He employed a full-time housekeeper, two maids and a casual ironing lady in a large, well furnished home. By the early 1920s, Toby Pearce began removing the sheep and the orchards in preference for commercial dairying. Considerable expansion of the industry occurred, facilitated by the new introductions of exotic grasses and the rise of modern agricultural science in this period. After Toby's death in 1933, his wife Nellie leased the property: two different leases ran the dairy from 1934 to 1938 and 1938–40. In this period a new dairy was constructed east of the old packing shed. Nellie Pearce died in 1941 and for some time the property was managed by her son Edward. By late 1949, the Pearce family had decided to sell Bella Vista.

=== Ownership since the 1950s ===
The Pearce family sold Bella Vista in 1950 to the North Sydney Brick and Tile Company (later to become Norbrick) for A£34,492 and 10 shillings. In 1952 the house and farm buildings was leased to a Mrs Jones who continued to use the property as a dairy farm. Some poultry was kept but not as a farming venture. The North Sydney Brick and Tile Company commenced brick making on the southern side of the site in 1956. The onsite operations expanded during the 1960s and 1970s.

The site on which the Bella Vista now stands were acquired by the Metropolitan Water, Sewerage and Drainage Board in 1974 as part of its resumption of 13.63 hectares (33.7 acres) for the potential erection of water storage facilities.

In 1979 the Jones family left the property.

=== Conservation orders and subsequent heritage protection ===
An Interim Conservation order was placed on Bella Vista in 1979. A permanent conservation order was made on 25 July 1997.

A report on the history of Bella Vista prepared by Jenny Pearce, a descendant of the family which owned it for over 100 years, was made available to the Heritage Council of New South Wales' Restoration Steering Committee in 1982. Arrangements were made with the Policy Department to regularly patrol the property and Len Ward was appointed as a resident caretaker.

Officers of the NSW Department of Public Works working with staff of the Heritage & Conservation Branch prepared a schedule of urgent stabilisation works. The Heritage Council recommended funds be allocated for weather-proofing buildings per this works schedule, purchase of a suitable pump and hoses to work with the underground water supply for fire fighting. A statement of intent and draft brief for the garden and grounds was adopted by the Heritage Council and it was agreed that the garden study should be carried out by the Landscape Section, Public Works Dept. Michael Lehany of that section prepared a preliminary report on aspects of the landscape and Caroline Burke commenced recording physical evidence of the garden. It was agreed the report on the garden would include an inventory of existing vegetation, a plan showing the garden's evolution and guidelines for its future management.

Cathy Pinchin was engaged as consultant to interpret available aerial photography of the property from 1930 onwards to aid preparing garden evolution plans. A grid system was devised to enable accurate location of structures, garden elements and archaeological features and artefacts on survey plans prepared by the NSW Department of Lands. An additional report was prepared by the Heritage & Conservation Branch, in consultation with the NSW Department of Planning to include a visual catchment analysis and examination of planning issues relevant to the property's landscape setting such as quarrying operations and residential development.

Work commenced on clearing the underground water tanks under supervision of consultant archaeologists from the University of Sydney, directed by Judy Birmingham. Arrangements were made for more regular consultation on the architectural, archaeological, historical and landscape studies and a Working Group comprising representatives of the relevant departments and consultants was established.

By 1987 much of the land was being prepared for the Norwest Business Park.

In 1997 a Permanent Conservation Order was placed on the Bella Vista property. In that year the property was transferred from the Department of Planning to Baulkham Hills Shire Council (later to become The Hills Shire Council), along with funding for conservation works and preparation of a conservation management plan. Council have since progressively undertaken a range of conservation works to various structures and elements of the property, opened sections of it for passive public recreation, constructed walking and cycling tracks, picnic shelters, interpretive signage and investigated compatible public and other uses for the property as a public asset.

== Description ==
=== Overview ===
The Bella Vista farm group comprises the homestead, collection of outbuildings and core of an historic farm including slab fencing, series of paddocks, remnant mature indigenous vegetation, cultural plantings such as the bunya pines down the southern entry drive. The farm buildings are mostly timber slab construction, situated in a rural park like setting. The overall farm complex is a typical 1800s farming community virtually untouched.

The remnant farm estate comprises open woodland that is located north of the homestead group. The area retains mature indigenous eucalypt trees in both clumps and as individuals. Broadly this vegetation follows the natural ridgeline on which the homestead group is located. Trees include a mixture of "Cumberland Plain Woodland" species such as forest red gum (Eucalyptus tereticornis), narrow leaved ironbark (Eucalyptus crebra), white stringybark (Eucalyptus globoidea) and forest oak (Casuarina torulosa). These species form key components of the endangered ecological community of the Cumberland Plain Woodland, listed under the NSW Threatened Species Conservation Act.

Cultural plantings are generally located close to the homestead complex, and running south along the entrance drive are a row in places an avenue of bunya pines (Araucaria bidwillii). Other significant species/specimens include Moreton Bay fig (Ficus macrophylla), chir or Himalayan pine (Pinus roxburghii), stone pine (Pinus pinea) and cypresses (Cupressus spp.).

=== Scenic landscape ===
Traditionally the Bella Vista farm has had a number of approach routes. Each was unsealed. Four key ones have been identified:

1. the southern approach and bunya pine avenue, connecting the Pearce's other property to the south, including the homesteads of Kings Langley and Orange Grove (to Seven Hills Road). Thought to date from c. 1842 when the Pearce's first bought the farm.
2. the south-western approach, which provided access to a loop in front of the house and to the homestead courtyard, connected with Old Windsor Road to the south of Meurant's Lane. Date unknown.
3. two additional approaches, to the north-west, intersect with Meurant's Lane, one leading directly to the house,
4. the other leading to a slab hut (now demolished) occupied by farm workers. These were made to provide vehicular access and were probably mostly used in the 20th century. Date of construction is unknown.

An avenue of bunya pines (Araucaria bidwillii) has been planted along the ridge, thought to date from the late 19th century. A prominent local landmark on the ridge, viewed from Old Windsor Road to the west, from the south east and east (Windsor Road). A stone pine (Pinus pinea) marks the southern end of the bunya pines.

Bella Vista once had extensive pastures extending from Old Windsor to Windsor Road. Within the site curtilage, pasture land remains in the south, southeast, east and northeast of the site (of the homestead complex). The majority of the farm's historic pasture land has been redeveloped for housing and business park uses. Sections of this pasture land have been cultivated in the past, for instance for orchards and vines to the west of the homestead complex, crops to the north east of it. The inner and outer farmyards are located on the ridge and the buildings are visible from the eastern pastures. The pastures form the rural setting for the homestead comoplex when viewed from Norwest Boulevard. The main homestead is also set in pasture land, accentuating the effect of its cultural plantings.

The pastures are delineated by traditional post-and-rail fences and timber gates. Associated elements are stock management items such as a cattle crush and ramp. There is also evidence of the watering of stock, employing a commonly used trough, a recycled enamel bath tub etc.

Water for farm use came from dams and cisterns. One dam remains within the site curtilage, southeast of the house. The slopes of the ridge, particularly to the northeast of the house are currently used for grazing. As noted above, some pasture areas were cultivated in the past, as shown from a 1930s aerial photograph and records. For example, orchards and vines to the west of the homestead complex, crops to the north east of it, paddocks to northeast and north. Two areas of former crops are located within the site curtilage northeast of the homestead complex. Their proximity to the packing shed as well as the aspect of the slope probably influenced the choice of this area for cropping. The area is currently used for pasture.

A few citrus trees (Citrus spp., such as Citrus aurantiacum (orange) and Citrus paradisi (grapefruit) survive in the kitchen and front garden. Historic orchards closes to the homestead were to the northwest, on the slopes between the ridge and Old Windsor Road. Evidence of their layout may still survive in the archaeological record. There is no evidence of irrigation channels at Bella Vista, suggesting orchards were hand watered.

Farmyards, paddocks and pastures are all delineated at Bella Vista by traditional post and rail timber fences. In addition to the use of split timbers for building materials, posts and rails were manufactured on site for fencing. Rails were morticed into posts, with a special tool required to create the large eyelet. This form of fencing was not widely used in England, but was in common use in NSW by 1834. They consist of three strong horizontal rails, almost a foot wide, set into vertical posts five feet high, very roughly built but durable. The process of continual repairs to timber elements, by replacement of deteriorated members with similar elements, makes it difficult to date surviving fences.

The farm had a water supply fed by a number of dams, wells and cisterns, with one dam remaining in the site curtilage. The homestead is on a ridge and creeks flowed in three directions of this, southwest, northeast and northwest. Of these the creek to the northeast is the largest and most evident today. The current dam at the start of this creek is a modern feature, created by the Water Board when their facility to the east of the farm was installed. It supports frogs and plants.

The old dam is located to the southeast of the house with the dam wall on the east of the water body. It is bisected by a post and rail fence so it watered two paddocks. It is now heavily silted up. Adjacent to it is a brickmaking site identified in the Archaeological report. Remains of clamps and part bricks are near the dam.

Associated with it are a range of plants that respond well to damp conditions. Large Adam's needle (Yucca filamentosa) line the western side of the dam and the small creek forming its outflow is lined with forest oaks (Casuarina torulosa).

A smaller dam is located at the north of the outer farmyard but is now heavily silted up.

This is defined by fencing to the south and west separating the driveways and working areas which encircle the homestead from the surrounding paddocks. On the north and east it is separated from the paddocks by the inner and outer farmyards. The division is likely to have been for control of stock and to allow easier vehicular access in and around the buildings.

There are cultural plantings to the west associated either with driveways or windbreaks. The bunya pine line/avenue has a break at the gate in the old home paddock fence; the pines being on the west near the house and east further away. To the north of the homestead are the ruins of the woodshed and store and north of this is the temporary modern caretaker's shed, project office and toilets.

The outer farmyard was associated with the Packing Shed, and in the 20th century, with the dairy. The yarding and herding of livestock occurred here and the pattern of fences and gates reflects this. The precinct contains many small yards defined by split rail fences as well as a masonry loading ramp. It is directly associated through an entrance gate to the north of the packing shed. This area contains an early galvanised iron drinking trough. The killing yards were in this area.

The 1986 archaeological report noted that the area may also contain evidence of past uses of the farm yards, such as a sheep dip. The packing shed itself has also functioned as a woolstore and stables and for packing fruit, depending on the season. Unlike the inner farmyard which is largely self-contained the outer farmyard opens out into the pastures to the northeast.

This is divided into two distinct sections: the working yard formed between the barn, stables, implement shed and the drive, which is bounded by mature Moreton Bay fig (Ficus macrophylla) trees. A northern area also forms part of this yard, where the cow bales were built in the 20th century. South of the fig trees is a portion of inner farmyard originally bounded by pigsties and the blacksmith's hut on the east. These are now collapsing and the pigsties are archaeological remains.

The distinctive character of this precinct is created by the slab buildings and their rusted corrugated iron roofs and verandahs as well as the post and rail fences and the Moreton Bay fig trees. The yard is very self-contained, being located on the flat top of the ridge.

The inner farmyard is well served with cisterns. The two large cisterns at the rear of the Coach House (currently with fish in them) would have been used for the farmyard. The farmyard could be accessed from the main driveway and by the rear driveway through the woodland (to the northwest/north). This generally dates from the late 19th century; however, there is likely to have been some form of front garden associated with the earlier cottage, typical of early settler farm cottage gardens.

Some remnants of the late 19th-century garden survive, with later modifications. These include a symmetrical garden layout planted around the southern (main) facade of the house. This was semi-circular in plan form with the main planted areas fitting between drives and paths. A picketted fence defined this ornamental garden. The pickets were terminated at the side entrances by gates. Old photographs suggest that at least three different types of pickets have been used on this section of fence.

In the 20th century a row of cypresses (Cupressus spp.) were planted along a line of a former driveway which reflected the southern curve of the picket fence edge to the garden. Stumps of these trees are evident in the grassed area south of the existing fence. These plants were fashionable in the interwar years (1918–39). The stump of a Norfolk Island pine (Araucaria heterophylla) which appears in photographs from the late 19th century also survives, adjacent to the garden gate.

A 1980s survey (DPWS) indicates the layout of the front garden including the semi-circular layout south of the house and side gardens to its east and west. The majority of the plantings surviving in a 1992 survey included mature shrubs such as may bush (Spiraea cantonensis), cape honeysuckle/tecoma (Tecomaria capensis), citrus trees, roses, Nile lilies (Agapanthus orientalis) and irises.

A trellis was located near the eastern facade of the homestead; and a circular garden house was located to the east of the homestead; both are now gone.

The Homestead courtyard is located north of the homestead, delineated by four buildings, the main house (to the south), the kitchen block (west), Coach House/Fitzgerald's cottage (north) and the shop (east). The area has always been associated with service functions, for both the house and for farm management.

Three underground tanks or cisterns are located adjacent to the kitchen block, and archaeological investigation is needed to determine how water was obtained. Cisterns were often built of brick lined with natural hydraulic (Roman) cement or subsequently Portland cement render for waterproofing. Some had dome shaped tops. Gutters from the house supplied water to the cisterns/tanks.

This area is presently grassed with kikuyu grass, with a central grape vine trellis with a vine, and a second trellis in very poor condition adjacent to the eastern elevation of the house below the jasmine. Twentieth-century photographs show that an area at the rear of the house was fenced off in a rough quadrant shape with a picket fence with pointed tops (now gone). The grape vine trellis postdates the Pearce family occupation. Bulbs grow near the water tanks and around the front porch of the shop. A more comprehensive survey may reveal more seasonal plants here, such as bulbs.

DPWS surveys indicate that a drive may have connected the carriage shed with the front drive. A summer house was located to the east of the main house as noted above. Its exact location has not been identified.

A c. 1920 photograph shows the pump used to get water from the underground cisterns/tanks.

The kitchen garden is located to the west of the main house and still contains mature fruit trees, including a fruiting fig (Ficus carica) and some of the few surviving citrus trees on Bella Vista farm. This area also contains a septic tank as the property is not connected to the sewer main. Other plants in this area include poinsettia (Euphorbia pulcherrima), climbers (jasmine) and the bulb Crinum moorei.

The kitchen garden and the front garden were fenced. The kitchen garden does not have an elaborate picket fence like the front garden, as it was not intended to be seen. Hardwood split slab palings have been replaced or oversheeted with corrugated iron to the west.

The garden is sheltered by large bunya and hoop (Araucaria cunninghamiana) pines outside the fence to the west/northwest. Immediately outside the kitchen garden are the remains of two small sheds whose function has not been fully identified. One is possibly a privy, the other was a wood shed.

The citrus and stone fruit trees remaining are not of themselves significant, but they do provide an indication not only of the necessity of maintaining an extensive kitchen garden but also the long tradition of the growing of citrus trees on this site. The citrus trees in the front garden and here are the only remaining citrus trees on Bella Vista farm, which once was one of the largest citrus orchards in the state. These trees appear to have been for preserves (marmalade, etc.) rather than fruit for eating.

=== Homestead ===
The main residence is a two-storey Victorian brick structure rendered throughout with stone-struck cement. The pitched roof is now terracotta tiles, with single chimneys on north and south elevations and two on the west. Verandahs on north and south elevations are of concrete over sandstone, five iron columns on the south face and six on the north are by Fletcher & Son, Waverley. The south elevation also has an upper balcony with wooden floor, five iron columns (three intact) and ornamental late Victorian cast iron balustrade brackets and fringe. Original door on south elevation with fanlight, has two shuttered windows either side, with an extra door added to the east. This and the four French windows in the upper storey have shutters also. The two windows in the east wall are late Victorian in form - triple with arched head.

The earliest form of the house appears to be a single-storey cottage, with a jerkin head roof and dormer windows, a verandah with timber posts, a fretted valance and stone flagging. ("Hawkesbury vernacular"). This cottage and the separate kitchen block are thought to date from the Robertson's occupation of the property, between c. 1835-1838. The present homestead was a modification of the original cottage c. 1890, which removed the jerkin head roof and added a second storey. Additions were made to the east also. The verandah was also extended to form a double height verandah and rion lace columns and balustrade added. The French doors to the first floor verandahs and the Venetian windows to the eastern elevation appear to have been added c. 1890. The original window openings on the first floor appear to have been extended to the floor. The area between the house and the kitchen block at first floor level has been extended from the north verandah of the house to form a room known to generations of the Pearce family as the School Room, c. 1890s.

North west of the main house is a kitchen wing. A rectangular single storey three roomed structure of brick with shingled gabled roof subsequently clad in galvanised iron. Colonial Georgian style. Evidence of a loft. Later additions include skillion verandah and fibro additions. Difficult to date as the building form was used from c. 1820 until c. 1850. The construction of the kitchen block and the single-storey cottage (later modified to form the main house) probably occurred at a similar time, c. 1835. The two buildings were connected by a breezeway. Subsequent alterations have removed evidence of the existence of a breezeway.

The kitchen with its large chimney breast is located in the centre of the block. The chimney has a similar stepped construction as the chimney of the slab hut. It is also separate from the roof to prevent the spread of fire. To the south of this chimney is the bread oven. The arched opening to the bread oven has been bricked up but its outline is still visible. The oven has a domed top. Both the chimney and the oven have a sandstone base course similar to the remainder of the building, indicating one phase of construction. The building had a loft accessed from an exterior staircase at the northern end of the building. Although the door survives the staircase has been removed as have the internal floors. There are openings at both ends of the building, the southern one having been bricked up. The wall plates are secured with iron straps and there are unusual stub timbers supporting the verandah on the eastern elevation. A similar detail occurs to the western elevation, which no longer has its verandah. The addition of a milk room or dairy resulted in alterations to this (western) elevation.

The building is difficult to date as the building materials were used for several decades. The internal walls of the kitchen block have been altered and cement rendered. Evidence of earlier wall divisions may survive under this render. Some of the ceiling joists have also been altered. The eastern verandah is part of the original phase. The present structures to the west were built after 1950. There may be evidence of the earlier configuration under the concrete floor.

=== Other structures ===
The shop and aviary is located north east of the main house. A simple rectangular domestic scale cottage of timber weatherboard construction with a gable roof and skillion verandahs. Has been progressively extended. Generally timber floors throughout. Internal linings of timber boarding and asbestos cement sheeting, with battens. A variety of joinery is used including mid-late Victorian doors. The range of style and configuration of joinery used appears to indicate that it was salvaged or second hand. May have originally been two separate buildings, with a covered area between, which has subsequently been infilled. The floor in this area is a concrete slab laid on timber in a makeshift fashion. The south most and southeast fibro sections were added post 1950. The building to the east is of recycled materials and the southern portion has a pitched roof, now partially collapsed. External cladding is partly flattened corrugated iron fixed with modern nails.

To the east of the shop is the blacksmith's hut, enclosing the inner farmyard were the blacksmith's shop and pigsties. The blacksmith's shop is a small structure constructed of wooden slabs with the entrance on the east side and with a gabled corrugated iron roof. A 1940s photograph showed it with a substantial lean, since straightened, but in 2000 had collapsed further and is overgrown with shrubs and vines. The slabs and structure remain.

The remains of the pigsties are under the fig trees between the blacksmith's shop and the barn. There appears to be a rectangular pattern of posts which have a halved top indicating a previous roof of some sort. Between the posts is a low wall of timber slabs. The fence at the eastern end of the pig paddock has similar low vertical slabs.

A galvanised corrugated iron enclosure containing a pan toilet.

The Fitzgerald's Cottage or coach house is located on the northern side of yard north of main house. This appears to be the earliest construction remaining on the site. The name Fitzgerald's cottage was not used by the Pearce family pre-1950. No documentary records exist to date the construction, however materials and construction analysis give some clues. Originally a simple timber cottage with a brick hearth which has been extended and enclosed considerably. The brick chimney and the two slab walls survive from the earliest phase of construction, located within the (later) Coach House. The original building was a single-storey slab cottage, with bark roof extending to form a verandah on its southern elevation. This was a widely used building form from c. 1810 onwards.

This hut was probably occupied by shepherds or family members while more permanent accommodation was being built. It would have contained a single room. Other slab huts survived on Bella Vista, one being destroyed in the 1950s, the other being demolished in 1980. At some stage the floor was crudely paved with stone. The two surviving walls (north and east) have no openings. The openings are thought to have been in the front wall (south), probably a door and single unglazed window opening. The roof form is not known, but may have been hipped or gabled, and of thatch or bark. The chimneybreast has largely been rebuilt, and the bricks appear to have been made at Bella Vista of local clays. The chimney has a lower corbel, an unusual feature which appears to indicate the chimney has been extended, the lower corbel being the original height of the chimney. Date of this chimney is estimated c. 1850, within a range of 1840–60, possibly 1820–60.

The original roof and framing was removed, or extended, and a series of rooms added around the cottage. These had timber stud framing with weatherboading, indicating a later date of construction (after c. 1850), some of which has been recently replaced. The front of the cottage was removed and new joinery installed. The verandah was also added and the brick paving. Internally the additional rooms have wide slab boards except for the western end of the building which has a stone flagged floor in part and the remainder earth. The stone flagging may be a remnant of the original cottage. The ridge line of the original hut was raised and an upper loft area created. Machine sawn timbers extended the earlier pit sawn studs. As of 2000, this evidence has been removed since and the rafters are now saplings.

A major room was added to the north of the cottage forming a coach house, entered from the east. This was roofed using the ridge of the cottage and extending the roof at a lower pitch. There were further lean-to additions to the north and west and another to the west. The coach house was later adapted to a garage. Carriage and motor parts are still evident on the ground. The coach house may date from the 1880s, when slab construction was still used.

=== Exterior farm sheds ===
One of three slab buildings which form the inner farmyard is a barn. It comprises a central weatherboard gable with mainly slab walls, iron covered roof and skillions on the north, east and south sides. Slabs are added at the top but not fitted into a plate, rather they've been nailed on, indicating a later date of construction, i.e.: late 19th century. The shingle roof survives below later corrugated iron sheeting. Corrugated iron is also used to clad the skillion additions. The barn has a wooden floor with lower parts of the walls lined with horizontal boards. It has been strengthened with tie rods. There is a large pile of building materials adjacent to the barn which appear to have been salvaged. Their original source has not been determined.

The implement shed in one of the other slab buildings which form the inner farmyard. It appears to have been built in several stages, the earliest being the central bay under the loft, with weatherboard gable ends and slab walls to the southwest and south. The central (gable) bay was later extended to the north (its present position). The addition of skillion roofs on all four sides has also occurred, with the consequent relocation and modification of the slab walls. A long shed oriented north–south with its east side open of slab timber construction with weatherboard gables, a narrow verandah on the east and skillions to the north, west and south. The remains of a loft extends over the same area of the main shed. The whole shed shows extensive reuse as a fowl house. The corrugated galvanised iron roof appears to have been re-battened at some time and possibly replaced an earlier bark roof. There are no shingle battens as occur in the Stables. The earlier (southern) section has wider batten spacings than the later (northern) section.

The third slab building is the stables and feed shed. This gabled shed has skillions to the north and south. The roof was originally shingled and now covered over with corrugated iron (shingles remain beneath on the central gable roof only). Of timber slab construction, rafters of central gabled section are pit sawn, rectangular section hard wood. Rafters of the lean to sections are stringy bark saplings. Underneath the verandah the slab walls do not extend the full height of three walls, providing ventilation. One of the most unusual features is the timber stump floor, a section of which survives intact. Other stump sections have been dislodged but remain in the building. These show signs of fungal decay but are capable of preservation. Like other vernacular farm buildings the stables was constructed in stages.

The cow shed is a vernacular slab buildings to be built, along with Cow Bails, in the 1920s. A single roomed enclosure/and covered entrance. Timber log construction. The earliest phase of its development appears to have been an open structure with morticed five-bar post-and-rail surrounds. In contrast with the 19th-century vernacular buildings, machined bolts are employed as fixings. An adjacent building is the New Dairy. The cow bails are a long structure, used as a feeding shed. West end was of slab construction.

Adjacent to the cow shed, a purpose-built dairy with six milking bails and associated service area and cool room. Timber framed with a brick base and fibro sheet walls and iron roof. (1987) This building has been demolished; only the concrete pad remains. It was located between the cow shed and cow bails.

The packing and wool shed is a large farm building of timber slab construction with a central gable and surrounding skillion roof. This is the main building associated with the outer farmyard. Has a corrugated iron roof with an internal structure of massive natural timber posts and beams. It is possible the iron was its original roofing although detailed examination of the top of the roof timbers may show otherwise. In the form of an aisled barn, with a broken back roof. Earth floor. The original entrance in the western elevation has been modified by the construction of a secondary gable roof to create a wider and higher access, possibly for the loading of vehicles. This packing shed was later converted to stables with loose boxes. Some strengthening has been undertaken with tie rods.

There is a small square-roofed timber enclosure, now damaged by fire, possible a pan toilet enclosure. There is also a covered area which is semi-enclosed, used for wood chopping, and of timber log construction. A semi enclosed bird house constructed from second hand building materials. A collapsed open roofed wood storage area of timber log construction.

There are two former brick burning sites. The best preserved site is located at a small dam south-east of the farm complex. Much of the past use and appearance of Bella Vista lies below the ground surface. See other entries, and Birmingham /USYD reports 1981 and 1986. For information on the Pearce Family Cemetery, view that individual entry in the State Heritage Inventory.

=== Condition ===
As at 22 December 2003, the overall physical condition of Bella Vista was poor. Archaeological potential is high. Two Aboriginal sites have been identified at Bella Vista and it is likely that others exist.

The area now determined to be the location of the former sheep dip was covered by material determined to be of no archaeological significance, being fills introduced for levelling between 1950 and 1979. The fill appears to have been in place at the date of determination of the sites' registration for interim PCP in December 1979. The location of the sheep dip was identified as a result of that archaeological testing program which was initially undertaken to provide data to assist with run-off problems associated with building N in July 2002 (application no. 02/S60/68). As the test work proceeded it became apparent that the location included a portion of the former sheep dip.

=== Modifications and dates ===
The Bella Vista homestead site was developed as follows:

- Main residence built c. 1840s-1850s, additions 1864, 1887 and c. 1890.
- Kitchen Wing built c. 1840s-1850s, verandah added c. 1880, additions c. 1950s.
- The Cottage /Shop) built c. 1900, additions 1950s & 1960s.
- Blacksmiths Hut built c. 1870-1890.
- Thunderbox toilet built 1940s-1950s.
- Couchhouse built late 1820s-1840s, additions mid and late 1800s, early 1900s. Probably the earliest building remaining on site.
- Barn built c. 1870, additions late 1800s.
- Implement Shed built late 1860s to early 1870s.
- Stables built late 1860s to early 1870s.
- Cow Shed built late 1800s conversion 1920s.
- Cow Bails built 1920s.
- New Dairy built 1930s.
- Packing and Wool Shed built 1890s with later roof additions.
- Shed built early 20th century.
- Covered area built late 1900s.
- Avairy built late 1950s.
- Ruinous covered area built late 1900s.

Known modifications to these developments were made as follows:

- January 1992 – rabbit eradication program undertaken.
- November 1992 – pressure pump and poly pipe water lines and sprinkler for garden use installed to hose tap points, electricity line to pump installed in trench, and attached above ground to (and through) Fitzgerald Cottage. This temporary" system pumped pressurise water from ground tanks at rear of Fitzgerald Cottage.
- March 1993 – jasmine vine removed from fig and oleander trees.
- May 1992 to May 1993 – termite eradication program undertaken in various buildings - problems of dampness, fungal decary and sub-floor air flow noted.
- December 1995 to January 1996 – removed one bunya pine, replaced decayed metal water tank - supplies caretaker.
- February 2003 – kitchen block - chemical damp proofing barrier installed.
- February 2003 – Homestead, installed chemical dmap proofing barrier.
- March 2004 – Homestead (new roof and better drainage of foundations) and Kitchen block roof and verandah works completed. Timber packing shed, implement shed and barn stabilisation and repair works completed. Demolition of intrusive additions to the shop and kitchen completed. Reconstruction of external stair to the kitchen block completed. Archaeological assessment of Farm Park 80% completed, lowering of courtyard level and excavation of the wells is to commence shortly.
- February 2008 – Stabilisation of coach house and stables completed. Restoration works to Barn, Packing Shed, Implement Shed and Dairy completed.

== Heritage listing ==
As at 23 December 2003, Bella Vista is of at least state significance to NSW as follows (See separate entries at end for ARCHAEOLOGICAL and ABORIGINAL heritage significance):

As a rare example of an intact rural cultural landscape on the Cumberland Plain, continuously used for grazing since the 1790s: evidence of patterns of agricultural use of the farm over the last 200 years survive including field patterns, post and rail fences, vernacular slab farm buildings and evidence of the alignment of its traditional transport route, Old Windsor Road, as well as cultural plantings and remnant woodland tree.

For the survival of aspects of its rural setting with remnant indigenous vegetation on rolling hills, extensive pasture grasses, vistas from the site and views into the site providing its setting. Its ridge top location provides a panoramic view over the Parramatta River estuary.

Bella Vista Farm is one of the most intact and best examples on the Cumberland Plain of the summit model of homestead siting, where the house and plantings are sited high on a prominent hill in contrast with open fields around. Its driveway is intact and relates to the traditional transport route (Old Windsor Road). Its prominent siting allows views to and from the property from a wide area. Views to the "summit" are also available from Old Windsor Road.

As an increasingly rare example, on the Cumberland Plain, of a rural property, where the evidence of the staged development of the homestead survives: from slab hut to cottage, with a detached kitchen wing, to substantial villa, as well as the formal and kitchen gardens, associated vernacular farm buildings, and evidence of the paddocks, water collection systems etc.

The site contains an increasingly rare surviving example of the endangered ecological community, open Cumberland Plain woodland, with indigenous eucalypt trees, providing evidence of the park-like character of the pre-European landscape between Parramatta and the Hawkesbury, achieved by periodic burning to improve access and visibility. It was the site of often violent conflict between the local Aboriginal community and the stockmen over the alienation of land and the "theft" of livestock and provisions.

For demonstrating the result of the construction of the route to the Hawkesbury (Old Windsor Road), the subdivision of the adjacent land into small farms, intended to be intensively farmed in conjunction with common grazing lands. The name of the farm, Bella Vista, indicates the panoramic views from and to the site, a characteristic of the area, which was named Seven Hills by Matthew Pearce in the 1790s.

For evidence, in the documentary record, of the agricultural activities of the Macarthur family, managed by Elizabeth Macarthur from Elizabeth Farm, Parramatta, and locally by her stewards. Indicating early experiments at grazing sheep by Grimes, Foveaux and the Macarthurs that failed due to insect plagues, low stock per acre ratios, droughts and the unsuitability of hoofed animals to Australian conditions. Indicating also the monopoly held by, and extensive grants given to certain officers, including John Macarthur.

For evidence, in the documentary record and surviving physical evidence, of the economic activities of James Robertson and his family, his leases and grants reflecting the pattern of expansion of pastoralism in the colony under Governor Thomas Brisbane. The farm and its proximity to Old Windsor Road provide evidence of an extensive network of cattle routes connecting the Upper Hunter Valley with Sydney and Parramatta via the Great North Road.

For its association with citrus fruit growing, the local orchardists, including the Pearce family, played an important role in the development of commercial citrus fruit growing in NSW. The expansion of the suburbs of Sydney post World War Two have removed most traces of the market gardens and orchards that supplied the city markets, however citrus trees survive around Bella Vista homestead.

For providing evidence of the increasing wealth of local pioneer families during the nineteenth century, evidenced by the expansion of houses of the citrus growers: Chelsea Farm, Orange Grove and Bella Vista.

For exhibiting a wide range of vernacular and colonial building techniques, for which evidence survives in both the buildings and archaeological record, including: split timbers, the use of saplings and stumps, mud and clay and raw hide straps. Evidence also survives of the retention of indigenous hardwood trees (ironbarks) in the open woodland.

For providing evidence of changes in building technology in the nineteenth century from the sue of vernacular building techniques using materials available on site to mass-produced, often imported, metal and timber building components: corrugated iron, cast iron, cast plaster and slates.

For providing an indication of changes in architectural taste, from Colonial Georgian / Regency to High Victorian Italianate, reflecting also the increased wealth and status of the Pearce family. Changing taste in interior decoration is also evident in the surviving layering of paint, wallpaper, plaster, built-in fittings and chimney pieces.

As a rare example in NSW, of the extensive use of bunya pines, and other associated specimen pine trees, dating from the late nineteenth century, which have become a well-known local landmark. The cultural plantings on the site provide an indication of fashionable landscape design in the late nineteenth century in addition to mitigating against local climatic extremes: heat and drought.

For providing evidence through documentary records, and extensive oral interviews with the Pearce family, of the changing agricultural and horticultural use of the site by the family over three generations, reflecting changes in the economy of the Hills district and in NSW.

For providing surviving evidence of the management of the agricultural workers, their daily life, accommodating and working conditions. Evidence survives in the physical fabric and the documentary evidence of changing horticultural and farming methods and practices, the once representative farmyard configuration is now becoming increasingly rare.

For providing evidence of the oral history record of the association of Bella Vista and the Pearce family with the local Chinese community and the continuation of traditional festivals such as the Chinese New Year celebrations by this migrant community.

For providing evidence of the changing patterns of domestic life, moving away from the reliance on servants and home production. Providing a contrast between the need for a kitchen garden, and stored water with current suburban lifestyle where horticulture and gardening are hobbies rather than necessities.

For showing the form of the original cottage, the translation of vernacular building forms and techniques from Great Britain, and their modification to suit local climatic conditions and to prevent the spread of fire, prior to the introduction of statutory building regulations.

For providing evidence of the use of prefabricated cedar joinery elements: windows, chimney pieces etc., elements for which timber had to be brought from further afield.

For the potential of the surviving fabric of the buildings to reveal more of the detailed construction of the Hawkesbury vernacular construction, a regional variation whose original source is unknown.

For its educational and research potential, particularly associated with archaeological remains and with local history which is reflected in the level of community interest in the site and its history.

An associated site is the Pearce family cemetery, located nearby on Seven Hills Road, where Matthew Pearce, first settler of the district, and many of his descendants, are buried.

Bella Vista is a rare surviving record of rural development on Sydney's Cumberland Plain, with associations of Aboriginal occupation in the area from East Coast European settlement (1795) until recent times. It contains significant items of both natural and cultural significance contributing to its conspicuous siting, setting and distinctive landscape as a landmark in the Sydney Region. Architecturally, the complex of farm buildings prominently sited within a rural, park-like setting provide a rare and extensive record of later nineteenth century rude, timber slab construction and masonry homestead which enhance comprehension and interpretation of bygone farming and work. It has regional, national and international significance as it reflects the changing nature and structural organisation of Australian rural activity. Its fortunes can also be linked to technological and marketing innovations which tied Australian primary producers into international markets during nineteenth and early twentieth century.

The archaeological remains of the Sheep Dip are a rare (if not unique) surviving example of its type that is the closest know sheep dip to central Sydney. It was constructed after the time when most of the great sheep flocks were distributed further west. It is thus both rare in place and time.

Archaeological significance

The study site SHR item 754 has been historically examined, and the impacts of works since 1979 reviewed. A series of test excavations trenches were dug around the main building and several other locations in order to provide information about the nature of the deposition in those places with the view to reducing the ground level to positively affect run-off. In all cases but one the test excavation identified deposition or features of nil, low or moderate significance. Only in the location, now identified as a sheep dip, adjoining the packing shed (building N) was a relic of state significance identified.

The courtyard area trenches I-IV, XIV-XV produced substantially deposition from the Jones period which it has been determined is of lesser significance. Part of the Jones period additions to the site have already been removed. While the other trenches around outbuildings VI-XI identified almost no depositional material. Trench IX adjoining building G in fact identified unrecorded repairs to the structure in the 1980s. The significance of all the archaeological relics associated with the buildings already identified in the CMP is of a high state significance (although none has been tested to identify their exact nature and extent). The significance of all of the archaeological relics associated with buildings discovered by survey is likely to be the same, but has not been tested.

The tanks excavated (7-9) are of high local and state significance, and are both rare and unusual in form. The contents of the tanks have as yet to be fully examined but appear to be related to the end of the Pearce phase (1950). In summary Bella Vista Farm Park has a high and rare degree of potential scientific archaeological significance vested in data that can contribute to the understanding of the history of NSW and the locality, the rise and decline of stock farming and orchards in the district and, its associations with the Pearce family and to a lesser extent Joseph Foveaux, Charles Grimes, John Macarthur and James Robertson, (though only Robertson appears to have developed or used the property in any way other than for the grazing of stock).

The four stone artefacts found at Bella Vista Farm Park were in poor condition and were found in disturbed contexts. They are neither rare nor possess representative value. Their archaeological significance therefore is low.

Controlled archaeological test excavation would be required to assess the significance of subsurface deposits. If a larger sample of artefacts was found in topsoils across the site their analysis may contribute towards our current knowledge and understanding of Aboriginal occupation at Bella Vista Farm. However, given the intensity of previous archaeological investigation in nearby Rouse Hill and Kellyville, such an investigation is likely to provide further insights into past Aboriginal occupation and use of the area.

Aboriginal heritage significance

The Aboriginal cultural significance is a matter for the local Aboriginal community. The evidence of Aboriginal occupation, in the form of stone artefact deposits, was identified within Bella Vista Farm Park. These sites have public significance because they demonstrate Aboriginal occupation of land prior to European colonisation. However, this type of Aboriginal site is very difficult to interpret in a way that will communicate aspects of past Aboriginal life. The most common approach is to present artefacts in an interpretive display.

Bella Vista was listed on the New South Wales State Heritage Register on 2 April 1999 having satisfied the following criteria.

The place is important in demonstrating the course, or pattern, of cultural or natural history in New South Wales.

Bella Vista is a rare surviving record of rural development on Sydney's Cumberland Plain, with associations of Aboriginal occupation in the area from East Coast European settlement (1795) until recent times. It demonstrates the changing nature and structural organisation of Australian rural activity. Early land settlers John and Elizabeth Macarthur owned the lands and used them for grazing their Spanish "merino" breed sheep. Three generations of the Pearce family owned the farm (direct descendants of Matthew Pearce the first settler in the Parramatta district) and were responsible for the development of the farm. The farm represents the evolution of farming activities typical of a class of land owners in Australia.

The place is important in demonstrating aesthetic characteristics and/or a high degree of creative or technical achievement in New South Wales.

Bella Vista comprises an entire 1870s farming community including the large 19th-century homestead, all virtually untouched for 100 years. The complex of farm buildings is prominently sited within a park-like rural landscape created by the cultural plantings and remaining indigenous trees.

The place has a strong or special association with a particular community or cultural group in New South Wales for social, cultural or spiritual reasons.

It is representative of its original agrarians who were typical of the 19th century middle income earners. To ensure cash flow, the agricultural activities were adapted to suit changing markets.

The place has potential to yield information that will contribute to an understanding of the cultural or natural history of New South Wales.

The late nineteenth century rude timber slab construction and masonry homestead enable comprehensive interpretation of bygone farming life and work.

The place possesses uncommon, rare or endangered aspects of the cultural or natural history of New South Wales.

The split timber slab farm buildings are rare surviving examples of rude timber construction in the Sydney Region.

== See also ==
- Australian residential architectural styles
- Pearce Family Cemetery
- History of Sydney
