= St Stephen's Anglican Church, Newtown =

St Stephen's Anglican Church
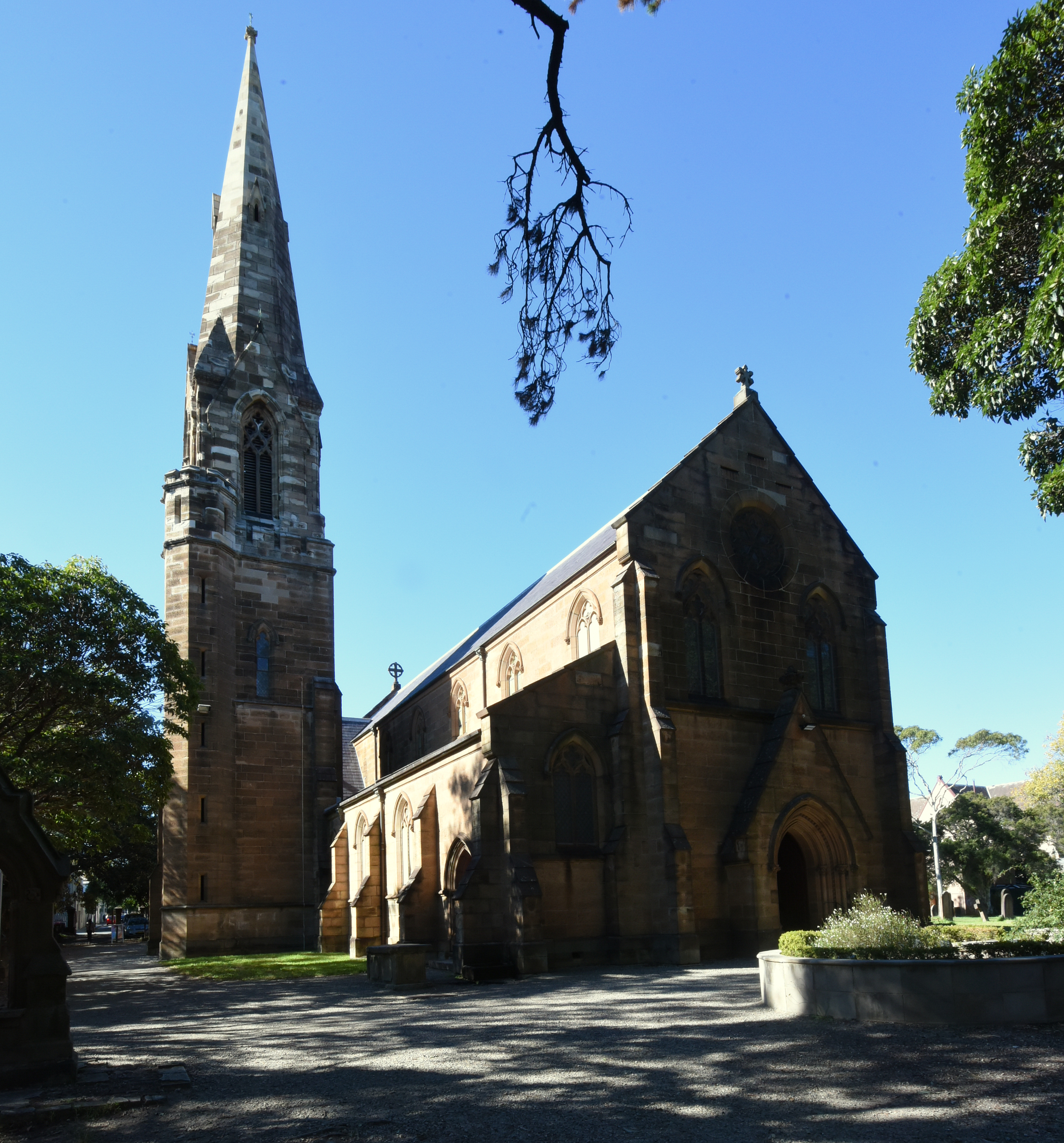
- St Stephen's Church, pictured in 2018

- Location in greater metropolitan Sydney
- 33°53′41″S 151°10′47″E
- Location: 187-189 Church Street, Newtown, Inner West Council, Sydney, New South Wales
- Country: Australia
- Denomination: Anglican
- Website: www.neac.com.au

History
- Status: Church
- Founded: 26 December 1844 (first church)
- Founder: Bishop William Broughton
- Dedication: Saint Stephen

Architecture
- Functional status: Active
- Architect: Edmund Blacket
- Architectural type: Church
- Style: English Decorated Gothic Revival
- Years built: 1871–1874
- Construction cost: A£13,000

Specifications
- Materials: Pyrmont stone; Slate roof; Stone terraced windows

Administration
- Province: New South Wales
- Diocese: Sydney
- Parish: Newtown Erskineville Anglican Church

New South Wales Heritage Register
- Official name: St. Stephen's Anglican Church and Cemetery; St Stephen's Church Of England; Camperdown Cemetery
- Type: State heritage (complex / group)
- Designated: 2 April 1999
- Reference no.: 462
- Type: Church
- Category: Religion
- Builders: George Dowling; Robert Kirkham

St Stephen's Anglican Church is a parish church of the Anglican Church of Australia, located at 187–189 Church Street, Newtown, Inner West of Sydney New South Wales, Australia. The parish, known as Newtown Erskineville Parish Church has a combined ministry with Holy Trinity Anglican Church, Erskineville Rd, in the adjacent suburb of Erskineville. The present building of St Stephen's Church was designed by Edmund Blacket and built from 1871 to 1874 by George Dowling and Robert Kirkham. The church stands within Camperdown Cemetery and together they form a precinct of historic, cultural and architectural significance. The precinct was added to the New South Wales State Heritage Register on 2 April 1999.

== History ==
=== Church ===
The Church of St Stephen's, Newtown, was founded in 1844 and opened for services in 1845. The present St. Stephen's Anglican Church is the second church by that name in Newtown, both of which were designed by church architect, Edmund Blacket who was the major designer of Anglican churches in NSW at that period.

==== O'Connell Town Church ====
On Saturday 23 November 1844, a call for tenders was placed in the Sydney Morning Herald for the construction of 'a small brick church at O'Connell Town. The name O'Connell Town, no longer in use, honoured Maurice Charles O'Connell, landholder, husband of Mary Putland, daughter of Governor William Bligh. H. Knight was awarded the contract to build the church, and a Mr. Brander was the carpenter. The foundation stone was laid, on Thursday 26 December 1844, by the Right Reverend Dr. William Broughton, first Bishop of Australia, who also preached. The Reverend Dr. T. Steele, Rector of St. Peter's Cook's River, assisted in the ceremony that was attended by a large crowd composed principally of residents from the immediate neighbourhood. The church was situated on the "New Town Road", near Victoria Street, on land donated by representatives of former Governor William Bligh's widow, Elizabeth.

The building was completed in nine months, at a cost of £417, and was consecrated on Tuesday 9 September 1845, by Bishop Broughton, at a service conducted by Dr. Steele, before a church "crowded to excess" with clergy, dignitaries, including Lady Gipps, wife of the Governor of New South Wales, Sir Maurice O'Connell, Lieutenant Governor of New South Wales, and his wife, Mary, a daughter of Governor Bligh, the Mayor, members of the Newtown Odd Fellows Lodge, and parishioners. The newspaper account described the church as a "very neat brick edifice, seventy feet long by twenty-six wide" with a vestry and belfry. The exterior was rather plain, the main feature being large rectangular windows, and the vestry/porch in the center of the building's three bays. The interior was "very neatly fitted up, all the pews being open". The roof, likewise, was open. Both open bench pews and open roof were recent innovations in the colony, (i.e. the building was Neo-Gothic, not Georgian in style) as was the seating arrangement for the choir, in stalls facing one another, in the chancel.

==== Present church ====
With the growth of population in Newtown in the 1860s, the small church had become inadequate. It had been designed so that it could be easily enlarged if necessary. This course of action, however, was rejected in favour of erecting a new church on a new site in Camperdown Cemetery. When finally replaced, the original church remained in use as the parish hall and Sunday School, until destroyed by fire on 16 September 1938.

Camperdown Cemetery, though not closed to burials, was closed, prior to 1871, to further sales of plots. In order to build within an existent cemetery, an act of the Parliament of New South Wales was required. A petition from the parish, signed by Christopher Rolleston, William Sedgwick, William Crane, T.C. Breillat and S. C. Brown, requested an act to enable the Bishop of Sydney to convey land to trustees of the church for the erection of a church and parsonage in the Cemetery grounds. Upon presentation by Charles Windeyer, member for West Sydney, the New South Wales Legislative Assembly voted, 10 February 1871, to receive the petition and proceed with an Act. The Act, entitled The Camperdown Cemetery Trust Bill, moved through both houses of parliament quickly and by late March it had received the Governor's consent. Copies were printed by the Government Printing Office and available at 6d apiece. The Government Gazette, 31 March 1871, provided official notice of the Act.

Edmund Blacket was appointed architect on 17 February 1871 and by June had submitted plans and called for tenders for the first part of the building. Blacket agreed to provide supervision of the construction. The contract for the first stage of the stonework (walls to the height of 17 feet) was awarded to Robert Kirkham and his partner, George Dowling. The foundation stone was laid by the Governor, Somerset Lowry-Corry, 4th Earl Belmore, on 11 November 1871. The rector, the Reverend Robert Taylor, conducted the first part of the service assisted by other clergy, and the Dean of Sydney preached. A scroll was read by C. Rolleston, and deposited in the cavity of the stone in a sealed bottle, which also contained copies of the Sydney Morning Herald and the Australian Churchman. The scroll was as follows: – "Newtown: To the glory of God, and in remembrance of the Christian Martyr St. Stephen, the foundation-stone of this Church was laid by his Excellency the Right Honorable Somerset Richard, Earl of Belmore, Governor-in-Chief of the colony of New South Wales, on the eleventh day of November, in the year of our Lord, 1871, being the thirty-fifth year in the reign of her Majesty Victoria, Queen of Great Britain and Ireland, &c.;, &c.;, &c.; The Right Reverend F. Barker, D.D., Bishop of Sydney and Metropolitan. Incumbent – The Rev. Robert Taylor, of Moore College, Liverpool, N.S.W. Trustees of Cemetery – Messrs. T.C. Breillat, S.C. Brown, W. Crane, sen., C. Rolleston, and Dr. Sedgwick. Church-wardens – Messrs C. Rolleston, Dr. Sedgwick, and W. Crane, sen. Church Building Committee – The Revs. R. Taylor and W. Scott, M.A.; and Messrs. M. Albery, M. R. Allan, R. N. Banks, D. Bedford, T.C. Breillat, S.C. Brown, Hon C. Campbell, Hon. J. Campbell, H. Chisholm, W. Crane, sen., W. Crane, jun., W. Curtis, G. Davison, Captain Evans, R. Fowler, F.T. Humphery, W.J. Jordan, M. Metcalfe, R.C. Murray, R.J. Rawsthorne, C. Rolleston, G. Rossitter, C. Sampson, Dr. Sedgwick, H.R. Smith, H.E. Vaughan, H. Vickers, and W. Wilson. Honorary Treasurers – Messrs. T.C. Breillat and S.C. Brown. Honorary Secretaries – Rev. R. Taylor and Mr. M.R. Allan. Architect E.T. Blacket, Esq. Builders – Messrs. G. Dowling and R. Kirkham."

It was announced that the church when completed would cost £8000, and £6000 would be needed to complete the edifice so that it could be used for divine service. £3000 had already been subscribed by the inhabitants of Newtown, and about £900 by the friends of those who had been buried in Camperdown Cemetery.

The building progressed quickly and by September 1873 tenders were called for the second stage of the stonework and completion of the walls of the church, clerestory, tower and steeple. Robert Kirkham was awarded the contract for the second stage. Others involved in the construction of the church were William Curtis, roofing, W. E. Elphinstone, carpentry, and W. Watson, sittings. St. Stephen's was completed in 1874, and a meeting of the subscribers to the building fund was held on Saturday 28 March to allot and let the pews. The first service of worship held on 5 April 1874, Easter Sunday, and an official opening on 9 April. The tower and spire were completed in 1876.

== Description ==
Because the full amount for the cost of the building was subscribed at one time, it was possible to erect the church in a continuous operation without stops and starts unlike so many other churches Blacket designed. The final construction cost of A£13,000. The dimensions are 34 by 15 metres (110 by 48 ft), making St Stephen's the largest and most prominent building in the area for many years.

Edmund Blacket designed St. Stephen's as a Gothic Revival church in the English style known as "Flowing Decorated Gothic". It is of an irregular cruciform plan, with aisles separated from the nave by arcades of six arches, supporting a clerestory. The chancel is framed by two vestries, and there is a porch to the south. The building is dominated, on the north side, by the fine 43-metre (140 ft) high stone tower and spire, which can be seen for miles. The walls of the church are sandstone, quarried from the nearby Pyrmont stone quarries. The columns of the arcade are of Melbourne bluestone and the roof is slate. Ornamentation, both internally and externally, is provided by the window tracery of complex design in both the chancel and north transept windows. The building is further ornamented with drip-mouldings around the arches of each window, each terminating in carved floral bosses.

Architectural historian Morton Herman calls the design of St. Stephen's, "a magnificent success – It is a church designed to be seen all round from every angle, and from every angle it is eminently satisfactory". In another of his books, Herman designates St. Stephen's as "one of the finest Gothic Revival buildings in Sydney." Joan Kerr describes the church as 'one of [Blacket's] most successful buildings', Blacket having, by 1870 "completely mastered his Decorated Gothic repertoire" and [being] more confident in composition and less fussy in detailing than in some of his earlier designs.' The tower and spire, she notes, are one of Blacket's finest compositions. Other than some minor alterations to the organ in 1895 by G.K. Sandford of Newtown, and a redesigning of the chancel by Sydney architect, Burcham Clamp, in 1927 and carried out by J. M and A. Pringle, the church remains as Blacket designed it.

=== Organ ===
The two-manual pipe organ with 1,100 pipes and tracker action, was built by the London firm, J. W. Walker & Sons Ltd, in 1874, at the cost of £800. Blacket designed the organ case, sending specification to Walker and Son. He also was instrumental in having the organ placed in the south transept rather than in the west gallery.

=== Carillon ===
The bells, a set of twenty hemispherical bells, manipulated by a baton clavier, were ordered by Blacket from the foundry of Messrs. Mears and Stainbank, Whitechapel, in the East End of London. Prior to installation in St. Stephen's tower, they were exhibited in the great Sydney International Exhibition of 1879–80.

=== Rectory ===
The adjoining Rectory was built in 1910. The Sexton's Cottage was built in 1848 and the huge Moreton Bay fig tree (Ficus macrophylla) to its immediate south-west and some of the European oak trees (Quercus robur) in the cemetery also date from this time.

=== Cemetery ===
The Camperdown Cemetery was established in 1848 on about 13 acres of the 240 acres granted to Governor Bligh, known as the Camperdown Estate. This was the first privately owned and operated Anglican cemetery in Sydney. It was the main cemetery for Sydney from 1849 to 1867. During this time it received over 15,000 interments and was the subject of a state government select committee inquiry. This inquiry was convened to address the mismanagement of a number of cemeteries within Sydney and it found that the accusations directed at the Camperdown Cemetery were founded. Sale of plots was terminated in 1867 and it closed in 1868 but a trickle of burials continued until c. 1920s-1940s (sources conflict on the end date), these being within family and pre-purchased plots and crypts).

Following its closure, the cemetery fell into disrepair. It was reduced in size in the 1950s when Camperdown Memorial Rest Park was established, comprising two distinct sections: the St. Stephens Church and remaining area of cemetery (within a six foot high sandstone wall) and the Camperdown Memorial Rest Park (without the wall), treated as broadly grassed open space with pockets of tree planting, and, directly south of the graveyard wall, a children's play ground area. The remaining area of cemetery has been managed since the 1970s by the Camperdown Cemetery Trust and the Camperdown Memorial Rest Park is managed by Marrickville Council.

== Heritage listing ==
This building is one of Australia's best Gothic Revival churches on this scale and its unique and historic surroundings render it a building of the highest importance. The church is in a prominent position on the crest of a rise, approximately three miles south west of the city of Sydney. The spire is notable for miles. The cemetery forms a unique close to the Church; it contains numerous fine trees including a large Moreton Fig Tree.

St Stephen's Anglican Church was listed on the New South Wales State Heritage Register on 2 April 1999.

== See also ==
- List of Anglican church buildings in Sydney
- Australian non-residential architectural styles
