= Performing Arts WA Awards =

Awards in Perth, Western Australia

The Performing Arts WA Awards, or PAWA awards, are annual awards for the performing arts in Perth, Western Australia. The awards are held by Artist Relief Fund WA, and were formerly known as the Equity Guild Awards. The awards include mainstage theatre and independent theatre and, from 2018, dance. A musicals and opera section was introduced in 2021.

== Selected awards ==
=== Theatre: Best Mainstage Production ===
- 2025: Logue Lake, Geordie Crawley & Elise Wilson in association with Perth Festival
- 2024: Things I Know To Be True, Black Swan State Theatre Company
- 2023: The Smallest Stage, Bunbury Regional Entertainment Centre for Perth Festival
- 2022: Beanstalk, Spare Parts Puppet Theatre
- 2021: Hecate, Yirra Yaakin Theatre Company in association with Bell Shakespeare and Perth Festival
