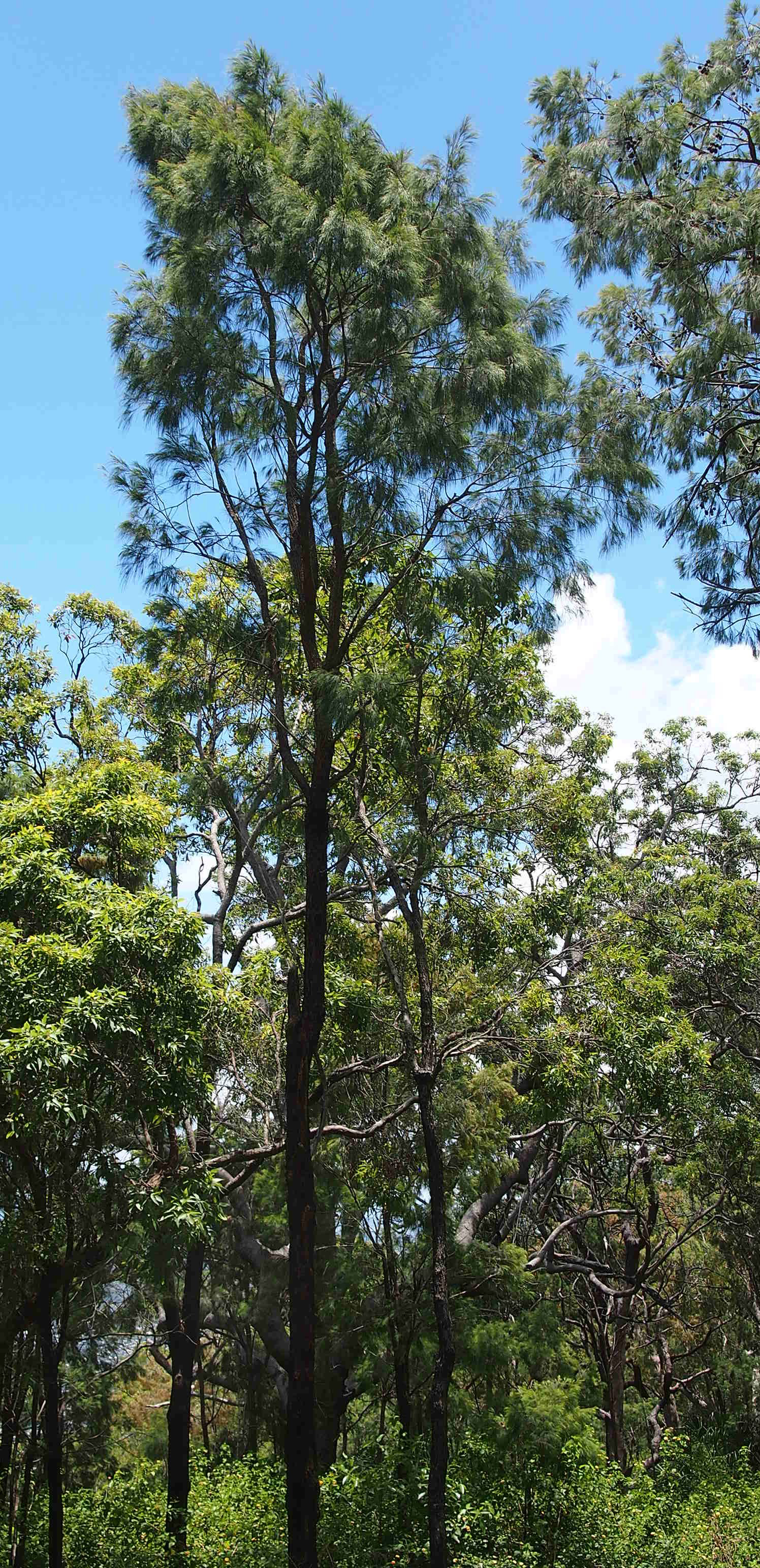

Conservation status
- Least Concern (IUCN 3.1)

Scientific classification
- Kingdom: Plantae
- Clade: Tracheophytes
- Clade: Angiosperms
- Clade: Eudicots
- Clade: Rosids
- Order: Fagales
- Family: Casuarinaceae
- Genus: Allocasuarina
- Species: A. torulosa

Binomial name
- Allocasuarina torulosa (Aiton) L.A.S.Johnson
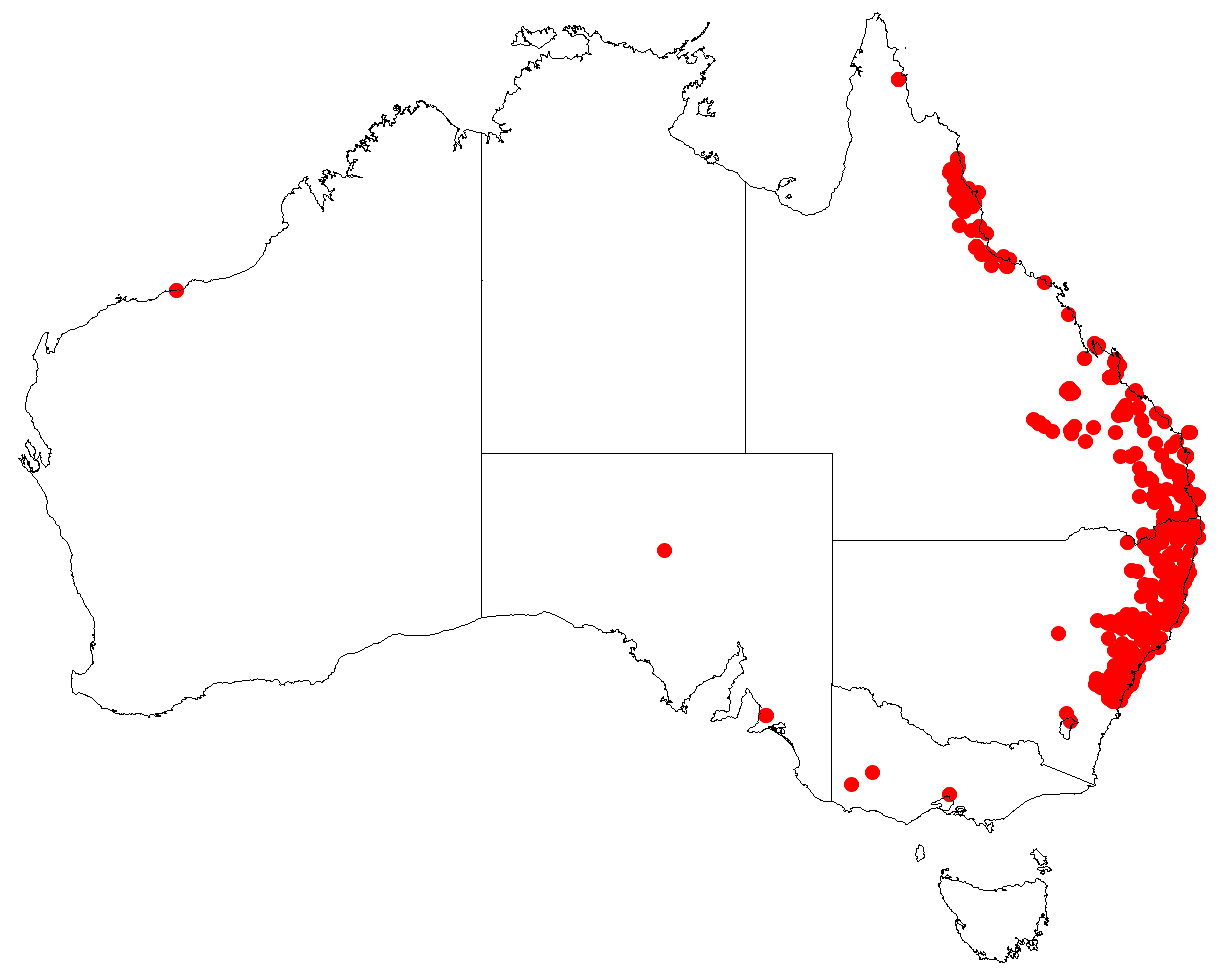
- Occurrence data from AVH

Synonyms
- Casuarina ericoides L.Gentil nom. inval., pro syn.; Casuarina lugubris K.D.Koenig & Sims nom. illeg.; Casuarina tenuissima Sieber ex Spreng.; Casuarina torulosa Aiton; Casuarina torulosa Aiton f. torulosa

= Allocasuarina torulosa =

Species of tree

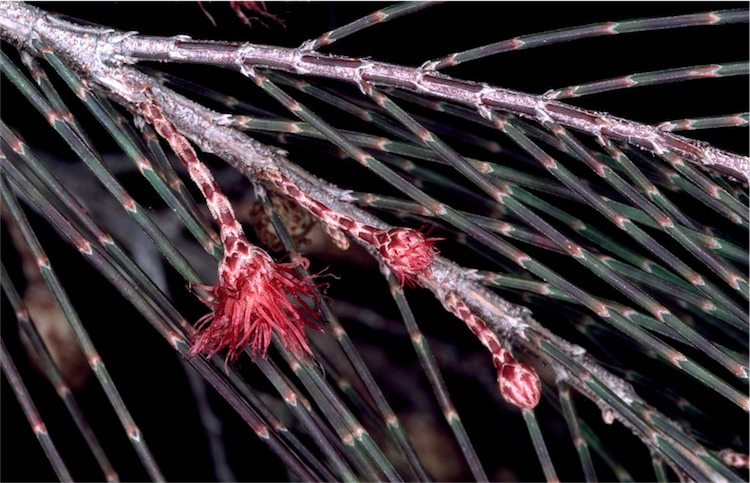
Immature female "cones"

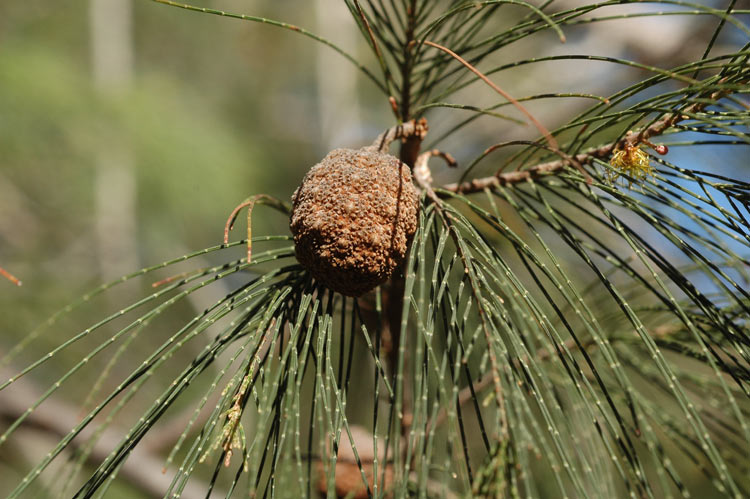
Foliage and mature "cone"

Allocasuarina torulosa, commonly known as forest oak, rose sheoak, river oak or Baker's oak, is a species of flowering plant in the family Casuarinaceae and is endemic to eastern Australia. It is a slender, usually dioecious tree that has drooping branchlets up to 140 mm (5.5 in) long, the leaves reduced to scales in whorls of four or five, and the fruiting cones 15–33 mm (0.6–1 in) long containing winged seeds (samaras) 7–10 mm (0.3–0.4 in) long.

== Description ==
Allocasuarina torulosa is a slender, usually dioecious tree that typically grows to a height of 5–20 m (16–66 ft). Its branchlets are drooping, up to 140 mm (5.5 in) long, the leaves reduced to erect, scale-like teeth 0.3–0.8 mm (0.01–0.03 in) long, arranged in whorls of four or five around the branchlets. The sections of branchlet between the leaf whorls are 5–6 mm (0.20–0.24 in) long, 0.4–0.5 mm (0.016–0.020 in) wide and more or less square in cross-section when young. Male flowers are arranged in spikes 5–30 mm (0.2–1 in) long, with 7 to 12 whorls per cm (per 0.4 in), the anthers 0.5–0.6 mm (0.020–0.024 in) long. Fruiting cones are on a peduncle 8–30 mm (0.3–1 in) long, and mature infructescences (fuiting cones) are warty, shortly cylindrical to barrel-shaped, 15–33 mm (0.6–1 in) long and 12–25 mm (0.5–1 in) in diameter, containing brown, winged seeds (samaras) 7–10 mm (0.3–0.4 in) long.

== Taxonomy ==
Forest oak was first formally described in 1789 by William Aiton, who gave it the name Casuarina torulosa in Hortus Kewensis from specimens collected by Joseph Banks. In 1982, Lawrie Johnson transferred the species to Allocasuarina as A. torulosa in the Journal of the Adelaide Botanic Gardens. Since it was the first species of the genus Allocasuarina to be named by Johnson, it is the type species of that genus.

== Distribution and habitat ==
Allocasuarina torulosa grows in open forest and on rainforest fringes in moister, more nutrient rich soils than A. littoralis at altitudes from 40 to 1,200 m (130 to 3,940 ft). It is widespread in north-eastern and central-eastern Queensland and on the coast and ranges of New South Wales, as far south as Macquarie Pass and Jenolan Caves. There is also an isolated population on Cape York Peninsula.

== Uses ==
The timber is reddish pink to brown. The rose she-oak has the largest contraction along the grain (12%) of any Australian wood and needs to be dried carefully to get full value as a useful timber.

== Ecology ==
The seeds of A. torulosa have been found to be a food source for the yellow-tailed black cockatoo.

== Use in horticulture ==
It grows from seed, and cut or broken trees will often regenerate from the trunk.

This is a low-maintenance tree that will grow in a variety of soils and tolerate light frosts. In the USA, it is suitable for USDA hardiness zones 8–11. It may be susceptible to Armillaria and Phytophthora.
