= St Kilda Short Film Festival =

St Kilda Film Festival is Australia's longest running short film festival and has been showcasing Australian short films since 1983. The festival, produced and presented by the City of Port Phillip, screens Australian short films in all genres including drama, comedy, documentary, animation and digital media.

The short film competition awards over $50,000 in cash and craft awards, including a $10,000 prize for Best Short Film.

== Past winners ==
Award	2009	2008	2007
Best Short Film	Boundless	Katoomba	
Craft Award	Miracle Fish	The Girl in the Moon	
Best Director	Boundless	Katoomba	
Best Documentary	The Love Market	My Dad Susan	
Best Animation	Mutt	The Girl Who Swallowed Bees	
Best Comedy	Being Carl Williams	Don't Panic!	
Best Actor	Tom Green (The Ground Beneath)	Luke Elliot (Dugong) & Damon Herriman (Len's Love Story)	
Cinematography	Directions	Crossbow	
Screenplay	Kind of Man	Dugong	
Editing	Shockwaves	Shadow Play	
Visual Effects	Lone	Advantage	
Sound Post Production	Ephemeral	Spike Up	
Original Score	The Ground Beneath	Eclipse	
Audience Award			
Indigenous	One Shoe Short	Brother Boys	
