= List of Australian films of 2009 =

== 2009 ==
Title	Director	Cast (subject of documentary)	Genre	Notes	Release date
$9.99	Tatia Rosenthal	Geoffrey Rush; Joel Edgerton; Anthony LaPaglia; Claudia Karvan	Animation; Drama	Regent Releasing	17 September
Bad Bush	Samuel Genocchio	Chris Sadrinna; Jeremy Lindsay Taylor; Viva Bianca; Malcolm Kennard	Thriller	Veni Vidi Vici Films	7 May
Balibo	Robert Connolly	Anthony LaPaglia; Oscar Isaac; Gyton Grantley; Damon Gameau	War	Transmission Films; Based on the novel Cover Up by Jill Jolliffe	14 August
Beautiful	Dean O'Flaherty	Deborra-Lee Furness; Erik Thomson; Peta Wilson; Tahyna Tozzi	Drama	Jump Street Films	5 March
Beautiful Kate	Rachel Ward	Ben Mendelsohn; Bryan Brown; Maeve Dermody; Rachel Griffiths	Drama	Roadshow Entertainment; Based on the novel of the same name by Newton Thornburg	6 August
Blessed	Ana Kokkinos	Miranda Otto; Deborra-Lee Furness; William McInnes; Tasma Walton	Drama	Icon Film Distribution	10 September
The Boys Are Back	Scott Hicks	Clive Owen; Laura Fraser; Emma Lung; Erik Thomson; Julia Blake	Drama	Miramax Films; Based on the novel The Boys Are Back in Town by Simon Carr	12 November
Bright Star	Jane Campion	Ben Whishaw; Abbie Cornish; Kerry Fox; Thomas Sangster	Biography; Drama	Apparition Films	26 December
Broken Hill	Dagen Merill	Luke Arnold; Alexa Vega; Timothy Hutton; Rhys Wakefield	Drama	Umbrella Entertainment	11 September
Cedar Boys	Sehat Caradee	Rachael Taylor; Martin Henderson; Les Chantery; Daniel Amalm; Buddy Dannoun	Drama	Mushroom Pictures	30 July
Charlie & Boots	Dean Murphy	Paul Hogan; Shane Jacobson; Roy Billing; Morgan Griffin	Comedy	Paramount Pictures	3 September
Closed for Winter	James Bogle	Natalie Imbruglia; Danielle Catanzariti; Deborah Kennedy; Daniel Frederiksen	Drama	Omnilab Media; Based on the novel of the same name by Georgia Blain	23 April
Coffin Rock	Rupert Glasson	Lisa Chappell; Robert Taylor; Sam Parsonson; Joseph Del Re	Thriller	Ultra Films	22 October
The Combination	David Field	George Basha; Firass Dirani; Clare Bowen; Vaughn White	Drama	Australian Film Syndicate	26 February
Crush	John V. Soto	Chris Egan; Emma Lung; Brooke Harman; Christian Clark	Thriller	Phase 4 Films	10 April
Disgrace	Steve Jacobs	Eriq Ebouaney; John Malkovich; Jessica Haines; Antoinette Engel	Drama	Dendy Films; Based on the novel of the same name by J. M. Coetzee	8 June
Eraser Children	Nathan Christoffel	Rob Alec; Simon Barbaro; Justin Bechtold; Andrew Baker	Comedy	Colour Pictures	29 August
Family Demons	Ursula Dabrowsky	Cassandra Kane; Kerry Reid; Alex Rafalowicz; Tommy Darwin	Horror	Peacock Films	25 March
Home of Strangers	Doan Nguyen	Jimmy Huynh; Nicole Pritchard; Karen Truong; Laurent Boiteux	Action	Passage Entertainment	1 August
I.C.U.	Aash Aaron	Margot Robbie; Aash Aaron; Ozzie Devrish; Christian Radford	Thriller	Osiris Entertainment	11 November
In Her Skin	Simone North	Miranda Otto; Guy Pearce; Ruth Bradley; Sam Neill	Thriller	Goldcrest Films; Based on the novel Perfect Victim by Elizabeth Southall	14 March
Last Ride	Glendyn Ivin	Hugo Weaving; Tom Russell; Kelton Pell; Anita Hegh	Drama	Madman Entertainment; Based on the novel of the same name by Denise Young	2 July
The Loved Ones	Sean Byrne	Xavier Samuel; Robin McLeavy; John Brumpton	Horror	Madman Entertainment	13 September
Lucky Country	Kriv Stenders	Aden Young; Toby Wallace; Hanna Mangan-Lawrence; Eamon Farren	Drama	Transmission Films	16 July
Mao's Last Dancer	Bruce Beresford	Bruce Greenwood; Chi Cao; Kyle MacLachlan; Joan Chen	Biography	Roadshow Entertainment; Based on the novel of the same name by Li Cunxin	1 October
Mary and Max	Adam Elliot	Toni Collette; Eric Bana; Barry Humphries; Philip Seymour Hoffman; Bethany Whitmore	Animation; Comedy	Icon Films	9 April
My Year Without Sex	Sarah Watt	Matt Day; Sacha Horler; Portia Bradley; Jonathan Segat	Drama	Hibiscus Films	28 May
Offside	Gian Carlo Petraccaro	Terry Rogers; Saxon Cordeaux; Ben Darsow; Natascha Dowsett	Romance	Urtext Film Productions	25 February
Prey	George T. Miller	Natalie Bassingthwaighte; Jesse Johnson; Natalie Walker; Ben Kermode	Horror	Top Cat Films	12 May
Prime Mover	David Caesar	Michael Dorman; Emily Barclay; Ben Mendelsohn; William McInnes	Drama	Transmission Films	8 June
Samson and Delilah	Warwick Thornton	Rowan McNamara; Marissa Gibson; Scott Thornton; Matthew Gibson	Drama	Madman Entertainment	7 May
Stone Bros.	Richard Frankland	Luke Carroll; Peter Phelps; Jai Courtney; Leon Burchill	Comedy	Warner Bros.	12 September
Storage	Michael Craft	Saskia Burmeister; Robert Mammone; Matthew Scully; Robert Price	Horror	Rich Vein Productions	16 August
Subdivision	Sue Brooks	Ashley Bradnam; Gary Sweet; Brooke Satchwell; Aaron Fa'aoso	Comedy	Buena Vista International	20 August
Tomboys	Nathan Hill	Candice Day; Naomi Davis; Sash Milne; Allie Hall	Horror	Alliance Motion Pictures	16 October
Two Fists, One Heart	Shawn Seet	Daniel Amalm; Ennio Fantastichini; Jessica Marais; Tim Minchin	Drama	Walt Disney	19 March
Van Diemen's Land	Jonathan auf der Heide	Oscar Redding; Torquil Neilson; Tom Wright	Thriller	Madman Entertainment	24 September
Where the Wild Things Are	Spike Jonze	Max Records; Catherine Keener; Mark Ruffalo; James Gandolfini	Fantasy	Warner Bros. Based on the novel of the same name by Maurice Sendak	3 December

== See also ==
- 2009 in Australia
- 2009 in Australian television
- List of 2009 box office number-one films in Australia
