= 2009 Australian Film Institute Awards =

Australian film and TV awards ceremony

51st Australian Film Institute Awards
- Date: 5 December 2009 and Friday, 11 December 2009
- Site: Regent Theatre, Melbourne
- Hosted by: Julia Zemiro

Highlights
- Best Film: Samson & Delilah
- Best Direction: Warwick Thornton; Samson & Delilah
- Best Actor: Anthony LaPaglia; Balibo
- Best Actress: Frances O'Connor; Blessed
- Most awards: Samson & Delilah (7)
- Most nominations: Balibo (14)

Television coverage
- Network: Nine Network

The 51st Annual Australian Film Institute Awards ceremony, honouring the best in film and television acting achievements for 2009 in the cinema of Australia, took place over two nights on 5 December 2009 and 11 December 2009 at the Regent Theatre, Melbourne and broadcast on the Nine Network.

During the ceremonies, the Australian Film Institute presented Australian Film Institute Awards (AFI awards) in 40 categories, including feature films, television, animation, and documentary. The ceremony was hosted by Julia Zemiro of SBS's RocKwiz.

Nominations were announced on 28 October 2009, with Balibo receiving the most with 14 in total. A new award introduced in 2009 was for the highest grossing film, recognising box office figures exceeding $65 million in the previous 12 months.

Winners are listed first and highlighted in boldface; with nominees thereafter.

== AFI Film Awards ==
**Best Film**: **Samson and Delilah – Kath Shelper**; Balibo – Anthony LaPaglia, Dominic Purcell; Beautiful Kate – Bryan Brown, Leah Churchill-Brown; Blessed – Al Clark; Mao's Last Dancer – Jane Scott; Mary and Max – Melanie Coombs	**Best Direction**: **Warwick Thornton – Samson and Delilah**; Bruce Beresford – Mao's Last Dancer; Robert Connolly – Balibo; Rachel Ward – Beautiful Kate
Best Original Screenplay	Best Adapted Screenplay
**Warwick Thornton – Samson and Delilah**; Sarah Watt – My Year Without Sex; Serhat Caradee – Cedar Boys; Adam Elliot – Mary and Max	**Robert Connolly, David Williamson – Balibo, based on the killing of the Balibo Five**; Rachel Ward – Beautiful Kate, based on the novel Beautiful Kate by Newton Thornburg; Andrew Bovell, Patricia Cornelius, Melissa Reeves, Christos Tsiolkas – Blessed, based on the play Who's Afraid of the Working Class? by Andrew Bovell; Jan Sardi – Mao's Last Dancer, based on the autobiographical novel of the same name by Li Cunxin
Best Lead Actor	Best Lead Actress
**Anthony LaPaglia as Roger East – Balibo**; Rowan McNamara as Samson – Samson and Delilah; Ben Mendelsohn as Ned Kendall – Beautiful Kate; Hugo Weaving as Thomas Kev – Last Ride	**Frances O'Connor as Rhonda – Blessed**; Marissa Gibson as Delilah – Samson and Delilah; Sacha Horler as Natalie – My Year Without Sex; Sophie Lowe as Kate – Beautiful Kate
Best Supporting Actor	Best Supporting Actress
**Oscar Isaac as José Ramos-Horta – Balibo**; Bryan Brown as Bruce Kendall – Beautiful Kate; Damon Gameau as Greg Shackleton – Balibo; Brandon Walters as Nullah – Australia	**Rachel Griffiths as Sally Kendall – Beautiful Kate**; Maeve Dermody as Toni – Beautiful Kate; Mitjili Napanangka Gibson as Nana – Samson and Delilah; Bea Viegas as Juliana – Balibo
Best Cinematography	Best Editing
**Warwick Thornton – Samson and Delilah**; Andrew Commis – Beautiful Kate; Greig Fraser – Last Ride; Tristan Milani – Balibo	**Nick Meyers – Balibo**; Jill Bilcock – Blessed; Mark Warner – Mao's Last Dancer; Roland Gallois – Samson and Delilah
Best Original Music Score	Best Sound
**Christopher Gordon – Mao's Last Dancer**; David Hirschfelder – Australia; Lisa Gerrard – Balibo; Warwick Thornton – Samson and Delilah	**Liam Egan, Tony Murtagh, Robert Sullivan, Yulia Akerholt, Les Fiddess – Samson and Delilah**; Wayne Pashley, Guntis Sics – Australia; Sam Petty, Emma Bortignon, Phil Heywood, Ann Aucote – Balibo; David Lee, Andrew Neil, Yulia Akerholt, Mark Franken, Roger Savage – Mao's Last Dancer
Best Production Design	Best Costume Design
**Catherine Martin, Ian Gracie, Karen Murphy, Beverley Dunn – Australia**; Robert Cousins – Balibo; Herbert Pinter – Mao's Last Dancer; Adam Elliot – Mary and Max	**Catherine Martin, Eliza Godman – Australia**; Cappi Ireland – Balibo; Mariot Kerr – Lucky Country; Anna Borghesi – Mao's Last Dancer

== AFI Television Awards ==
=== AFI Award for Best Television Drama Series ===
Winner	Recipient(s)	Network	Other nominees
East West 101 (Season 2)	Kristine Wyld; Steve Knapman	SBS TV	Packed to the Rafters – Jo Porter (Seven Network); Satisfaction (Season 2) – Andrew Walker, Roger Simpson (Showcase); Underbelly: A Tale of Two Cities – Greg Haddrick, Brenda Pam (Nine Network)

=== AFI Award for Best Telefeature, Mini-Series or Short-Run Series ===
Winner	Recipient(s)	Network	Other nominees
False Witness	Greg Haddrick; Peter Andrikidis	UKTV	3 Acts of Murder – Sue Taylor (ABC1); The Last Confession of Alexander Pearce – Nial Fulton (ABC1); Saved – Michael McMahon, Tony Ayres (SBS TV)

=== AFI Award for Best Direction in Television ===
Winner	Episode	Recipient(s)	Network	Other nominees
East West 101	Season 2 Episode #13 "Atonement"	Peter Andrikidis	SBS TV	False Witness: Episode 1 – Peter Andrikidis (UKTV); Review with Myles Barlow: Episode 1 – Trent O'Donnell (ABC1); Underbelly: A Tale of Two Cities: Episode 11, "The Brotherhood" – Grant Brown (Nine Network)

=== AFI Award for Best Screenplay in Television ===
Winner	Episode	Recipient(s)	Network	Other nominees
Underbelly: A Tale of Two Cities	Episode #11 "The Brotherhood"	Kris Mrksa	Nine Network	30 Seconds: Episode 4, "Invisible Fault Lines" – Tim Bullock, Justin Drape, Scott Nowell (Foxtel); East West 101: Season 2, Episode #13, "Atonement" – Michael Miller, Kristen Dunphy (SBS TV); Review with Myles Barlow: Episode #1 – Trent O’Donnell, Phil Lloyd (ABC1)

=== AFI Award for Best Lead Actor in a Television Drama ===
Winner	Production	Network	Other nominees
Roy Billing	Underbelly: A Tale of Two Cities	Nine Network	Robert Menzies – 3 Acts of Murder (ABC1); Don Hany – East West 101: Season 2 (SBS); Dougray Scott – False Witness (UKTV)

=== AFI Award for Best Lead Actress in a Television Drama ===
Winner	Production	Network	Other nominees
Susie Porter	East West 101 (Season 2)	SBS	Rachael Blake –False Witness (UKTV); Rebecca Gibney – Packed to the Rafters (Seven Network); Asher Keddie – Underbelly: A Tale of Two Cities (Nine Network)

=== AFI Award for Best Guest or Supporting Actor in a Television Drama ===
Winner	Production	Network	Other nominees
Damian De Montemas	Underbelly: A Tale of Two Cities (Episode 11, "The Brotherhood")	Nine Network	Bille Brown – 3 Acts of Murder (ABC1); Jeremy Lindsay Taylor – False Witness: Episode 2 (UKTV); Richard Roxburgh – False Witness: Episode 2 (UKTV)

=== AFI Award for Best Guest or Supporting Actress in a Television Drama ===
Winner	Production	Network	Other nominees
Anni Finsterer	3 Acts of Murder	ABC1	Claire Forlani. False Witness – Episode 1 (UKTV); Kathryn Beck. Scorched (Nine Network); Kate Ritchie. Underbelly: A Tale of Two Cities – Episode 4, "Business as Usual" (Nine Network)

=== AFI Award for Best Children's Television Drama ===
Winner	Recipient(s)	Network	Other nominees
The Elephant Princess	Jonathan M. Shiff & Joanna Werner	Network Ten	Time Trackers – Sue Taylor, Donna Malane, Dave Gibson, Paula Boock (Seven Network)

=== AFI Award for Best Children's Television Animation ===
Winner	Recipient(s)	Network	Other nominees
Figaro Pho	Luke Jurevicius	ABC1	The Adventures of Charlotte and Henry – Paige Livingston (Seven Network); Classic Tales – Noel Price (ABC); Zeke's Pad – Avrill Stark, Delna Bhesania, Liz Scully, Leonard Terhoch (Seven Network)

=== AFI Award for Best Light Entertainment Television Series ===
Winner	Recipient(s)	Network	Other nominees
Spicks and Specks	Anthony Watt	ABC	The Gruen Transfer (Series 2) – Andrew Denton, Anita Jacoby, Jon Casimir, Debbie Cuell (ABC); RocKwiz – Brian Nankervis, Ken Connor, Peter Bain-Hogg, Joe Connor (SBS)

=== AFI Award for Best Performance in a Television Comedy ===
Winner	Production	Network	Other nominees
Phil Lloyd	Review with Myles Barlow	ABC	Robyn Butler – The Librarians: Series 2 (ABC); Kym Gyngell – Very Small Business (ABC1); Wayne Hope – Very Small Business (ABC1)

=== AFI Award for Best Television Comedy Series ===
Winner	Recipient(s)	Network	Other nominees
Review with Myles Barlow	Dean Bates	ABC	Chandon Pictures – Rob Carlton (Movie Network); Lawrence Leung's Choose Your Own Adventure – Nathan Earl, Andy Nehl, Craig Melville (ABC1); Very Small Business – Wayne Hope, Robyn Butler (ABC1)

=== AFI Award for Outstanding Achievement in Television Screen Craft ===
- **Luke Jurevicius**. Figaro Pho. For "Creative Excellence"

== AFI Non-Feature Film Awards ==
Best Feature Length Documentary	Best Documentary Under One Hour
**Glass: A Portrait of Philip in Twelve Parts – Scott Hicks, Susanne Preissler**; Bastardy – Philippa Campey, Amiel Courtin-Wilson, Lynn-Maree Milburn, Andrew de Groot; The Choir – Chris Hilton, Michael Davie; Lionel – Lizzette Atkins	**Solo – Jennifer Peedom**; The Love Market – Shalom Almond; Salt – Michael Angus; Tackling Peace – Marc Radomsky
Best Documentary Series	Best Direction in a Documentary
**First Australians – Darren Dale, Rachel Perkins, Helen Panckhurst**; Beyond Kokoda – Stig Schnell, Shaun Gibbons; Once Bitten – Beth Frey, Janette Howe; Voices from the Cape – David Selvarajah Vadiveloo, Anna Kaplan	**The Choir – Michael Davie**; Bastardy – Amiel Courtin-Wilson; First Australians (Episode 4: "There is No Other Law") – Rachel Perkins; The Love Market – Shalom Almond
Best Cinematography in a Documentary	Best Editing in a Documentary
**Cracking the Colour Code (Episode 2: "Making Colours") – Ian Batt, Vincent Fooy**; Beyond Kokoda ("Buying Time") – Stig Schnell, Shaun Gibbons, Brett Murphy, Ben Nunney; My Asian Heart – David Bradbury; Salt – Murray Fredericks	**How Kevin Bacon Cured Cancer – Zen Rosenthal**; Bastardy – Bill Murphy, Jack Hutchings, Richard Lowenstein; Cracking the Colour Code (Episode 2: "Making Colours") – Lawrie Silvestrin; Yes Madam, Sir – Megan Doneman, Annie Collins
Best Sound in a Documentary	Best Short Fiction Film
**Intangible Asset Number 82 – Matthew Ferris, Michael Gissing, Andrew McGrath**; The Choir – Sam Hayward, Phil Judd, Felicity Fox, Alli Heynes, Phil Vail, David White; Glass: A Portrait of Philip in Twelve Parts – Stephen R. Smith, Peter Smith, Tom Heuzenroeder, Adrian Medhurst; Lionel – Nick Batterham, Keith Thomas, Cezary Skubiszewski	**Miracle Fish – Drew Bailey, Luke Doolan**; Burn – Anna Kaplan, David Selvarajah Vadiveloo; Liebermans in the Sky – Jessica Redenbach, Richard Vilensky; Water – Sarah Shaw, Corrie Jones
Best Short Animation	Best Screenplay in a Short Film
**The Cat Piano – Jessica Brentnall, Eddie White, Ari Gibson**; Chicken of God – Jodi Satya, Frank Woodley; The Not-so-Great Eugene Green – Melanie Brunt, Michael Hill; Reach – Luke Randall	**Miracle Fish – Luke Doolan**; Boxer – Michael Latham; Liebermans in the Sky – Richard Vilensky; Water – Corrie Jones, Sarah Shaw, Ian Meadows

=== AFI Award for Outstanding Achievement in Short Film Screen Craft ===
- **Andrew McLeod.** Water. For "Cinematography"

== Additional awards ==
AFI Members' Choice Award	News Limited Readers' Choice Award
**Samson & Delilah – Kath Shelper**; Australia – Baz Luhrmann, G. Mac Brown, Catherine Knapman; Balibo – John Maynard, Rebecca Williamson; Beautiful Kate – Leah Churchill-Brown, Bryan Brown; Mao's Last Dancer – Jane Scott; Mary and Max – Melanie Coombs	**Mao's Last Dancer – Jane Scott**; Australia – Baz Luhrmann, G. Mac Brown, Catherine Knapman; Charlie & Boots – David Redman, Dean Murphy, Shana Levine; Samson & Delilah – Kath Shelper
Best Young Actor	Best Visual Effects
**Marissa Gibson & Rowan McNamara – Samson & Delilah**; Brandon Walters – Australia; Sebastian Gregory – Beautiful; Toby Wallace – Lucky Country	**Australia – Chris Godfrey, James E. Price, Andy Brown, Rob Duncan**; Death of the Megabeasts – Matt Drummond, Mike Dunn; Plastic – Sandy Widyanata, Eric So, Mathew Mackereth, Christopher Jackson; Scorched – Bertrand Polivka, Soren Jensen
International Award for Best Actor	International Award for Best Actress
**Russell Crowe – State of Play**; Martin Henderson – House; Anthony LaPaglia – Without a Trace; Guy Pearce – Bedtime Stories	**Toni Collette – United States of Tara (Season 1)**; Rose Byrne – Damages; Melissa George – In Treatment; Mia Wasikowska – In Treatment
Highest Grossing Film Award	Best Screen Content Innovation
**Australia – Marc Wooldridge, Baz Luhrmann, G. Mac Brown, Catherine Knapman, Paul Watters, Stuart Beattie, Ronald Harwood, Richard Flanagan**; Charlie & Boots – Andrew Mackie, Michael Selwyn, David Redman, Dean Murphy, Shana Levine, Stewart Faichney; Mao's Last Dancer – Joel Pearlman, Troy Lum, Jane Scott, Bruce Beresford, Jan Sardi	**Gallipoli: The First Day – Sam Doust, Meena Tharmarajah, Astrid Scott***; Forlorn Gaze – Sarah-Jane Woulahan; Scarygirl – Sophie Byrne, Nathan Jurevicius; Scorched – Ellenor Cox, Marcus Gillezeau

=== AFI International Award for Excellence in Filmmaking ===
- **Nathan McGuinness.** Senior Visual Effects Supervisor

*presented at the AFI Outstanding Achievement Dinner in August.

== Individual awards ==
=== AFI Raymond Longford Award* ===
- **Geoffrey Rush**

=== Byron Kennedy Award ===
- **Ray Brown**

*presented at the AFI Outstanding Achievement Dinner in August.

== Multiple nominations ==
- Fourteen: Balibo
- Thirteen: Samson and Delilah
- Ten: Beautiful Kate
- Nine: Mao's Last Dancer
- Eight: Australia
