= Australian Film Institute Award for Best Sponsored Documentary =

Former Australian documentary award

Best Sponsored Documentary AACTA Award
- Country: Australia
- Presented by: Australian Film Institute (AFI)
- First award: 1983
- Final award: 1986
- Website: http://www.aacta.org

The Australian Film Institute Award for Best Sponsored Documentary was an award presented by the Australian Film Institute (AFI). It was presented at the Australian Film Institute Awards (known commonly as the AFI Awards), which are now the AACTA Awards after the establishment of the Australian Academy of Cinema and Television Arts (AACTA), by the AFI. The award was handed out from 1983 to 1986.

== Winners ==
Year	Film	Screenwriter(s)
1983 (25th)	Street Kids	Kent Chadwick
1984 (26th)	One Last Chance	Terry Jennings
1985 (27th)	Timber Craft (Artisans of Australia)	Pamela Paddon
1986 (28th)	Down There	Sabina Wynn

== See also ==
- AACTA Award for Best Feature Length Documentary
- AACTA Award for Best Documentary Under One Hour
- AACTA Award for Best Documentary Series
- Australian Film Institute Award for Best Documentary
- Australian Film Institute Award for Best Television Documentary
- AACTA Awards
