= Shalom Almond =

Australian documentary filmmaker

Shalom Almond is an Australian documentary filmmaker. Her first feature documentary was The Love Market (2009), about the girls living on the street in Vietnam. She is especially known for two documentary films about women in the Adelaide Women's Prison, Prisoners and Pups (2018), and Songs Inside (2024), which won several awards.

== Early life and education ==
Shalom Almond was born on 6 May 1978.

She attended Blackwood High School in the Adelaide Hills, and studied filmmaking at the University of South Australia, graduating in 1998/1999, when she was just 20.

Almond lived in Belair as a young woman.

== Career ==
=== Film ===
Almond is a writer, director, and producer who has been working in the industry in Adelaide, South Australia, since she was 20 years old, having just graduated from university.

In 1998, a short film made by Almond and filmmaking partner Tamsin Sharp, Scrabble, won Best Script and the Film Makers' Choice awards, and was named the Most Outstanding Film at the South Australian Young Film Makers Festival.

In June 1999, Almond, along with David Lipschitz and Tamsin Sharp, made a documentary film to accompany an exhibition of Jewish history in Adelaide in the Migration Museum, Tree of Life. The film was screened on ABC Television's Snapshots as well as Channel 9's Postcards series. In September of that year, Almond and Sharp were making a film set at Belair railway station, titled 1 Day, 2 Tracks, having obtained funding for post-production of the film from Mike Piper of Piper Films. The film won a South Australian Film Corporation "Film Maker of the Future" award worth A$50,000.

In September 2001, Almond, then aged 23, was working on another short film, called Brushstrokes, "about an artist torn between his work and his private life". Funding was raised through grants and awards, including a Kodak prize of $50,000, and a young filmmakers' grant from Carciew Youth Arts Centre.

Later, taking a six-month break from filmmaking, she travelled around southeast Asia. There she found a topic in Vietnam that led her to want to make a documentary film about it: girls who lived on the streets in Vietnam. She received many rejections when pitching this, her first documentary feature, The Love Market, having had no previous documentary experience, but said that it taught her to keep pushing on. The film, which took four years to make, was released in 2009. The film had its world premiere at the 2009 Adelaide Film Festival, and won the Best Feature Film Award at the 2009 South Australian Screen Awards as well as Best Documentary and the IF Audience Award at the 2009 St Kilda Film Festival. It was nominated for Best Documentary (under one hour) and Best Director at the 2009 AFI Awards.

In 2010 Almond made Chasing Shadows for ABC Television, about a young Aboriginal hip hop musician called Colin Darcy, aka Caper, (Note: Caper later moved to Melbourne, and recorded an album in 2022 under the name Col Darcy.) struggling to find success in the music industry. In 2011 it won the Best Documentary Award at the South Australian Screen Awards. The title is taken from Caper's former backing band, S.H.A.D.O.W.S. Almond and Darcy became friends. Chasing Shadows was directed, written, and shot by Almond; produced by Almond and Lauren Drewery; and edited by Anthony Cirroco. The original score was composed by Ashley Close.

In 2011, she made a short film commissioned by the Media Resource Centre, Helping Hand Aged Care and ECH Inc, called Telling My Story. In it, older South Australians with short-term memory loss and the early stages of dementia share stories of their life. In 2012, Almond made Love Heart Baby, about the use of pre-implantation genetic diagnosis IVF.

My Long Neck (2013) is about a Kayan woman from Burma who, as part of her culture, wears 16 coils of brass around her neck, showing that she is a "Long Neck Karen" woman. Her neck is elongated by the tradition, which causes the collarbone to be pressed down, and the women become tourist attractions, and are known as "human zoos". Almond wrote, directed, and co-produced the film, with Katrina Lucas, and it was shot by Helen Carter. My Long Neck was filmed in the Mae Hong Son area of northern Thailand. A 2018 article about the film comments that "the potential 'object' of the film, Maja, becomes a co-filmmaker and agent of interpretation of human circumstances", thus becoming a voice for a marginalised people as well as telling her personal story.

==== Prisoners and Pups ====
In 2017, Almond was commissioned by ABC Television to make a documentary about Adelaide Women's Prison. The resulting film, Prisoners and Pups, showed a group of women who trained ex-racing greyhounds, socialising them and transforming them into pets to be put up for adoption. After spending four months talking to the women and filming at the prison, the experience led her to want to make more films about the prisoners. In November 2018, Prisoners and Pups went on tour around regional South Australia, jointly funded by the South Australian Film Corporation (SAFC), the Greyhound Adoption Program SA, and the Department for Corrections SA. Ex-prisoners who had featured in the film joined a Q&A at some of the screenings.

==== Songs Inside ====
In October 2018, Almond won the inaugural Lottie Lyell Award, which included A$20,000 cash, to develop her next project, then titled Through Prisoner Eyes. The award was presented by Gillian Armstrong at the Adelaide Film Festival.

Songs Inside documents the work of Barkindji singer-songwriter Nancy Bates, who initiated and runs a program in women's prisons called "Songbirds", teaching inmates how to play musical instruments and write songs about their lives. Bates had previously run in both men's and women's prisons, and held a songwriting workshop in the Adelaide Women's Prison during NAIDOC Week 2020. Bates was influenced by Archie Roach, who took her into prisons alongside Jack Charles, who worked with the prisoners by "connecting through storytelling". The Songbirds program culminates a performance by the women in prison accompanied by the Adelaide Symphony Orchestra, after 16 weeks from conception and around six weeks to write eight songs. The lyrics and ukulele music was sent to conductor Julian Ferraretto to create the orchestral arrangements for the performance. Almond, who had developed a good relationship with the Department for Corrections since making Prisoners and Pups, wrote, directed, and co-produced Songs Inside, along with Katrina Lucas and Lauren Drewery. David Scarborough was editor. The film was supported by the SAFC and the Adelaide Film Festival Investment Fund.

The film premiered at the 2024 Adelaide Film Festival, and received the Audience Award for Feature Documentary. The premiere event later won "Outstanding Work or Event Within a Festival" in the 2025 Ruby Awards. In 2025 it was selected for screening at the Sydney Film Festival, where it won Documentary Australia Award, and Melbourne International Film Festival. It won the prestigious CinefestOZ Film Prize, the richest film prize in Australia, in 2025. Several screenings were been accompanied by a musical performance and a Q&A with former inmates who had been Songbirds. Songs Inside had its international premiere at the Virginia Film Festival in Charlottesville, Virginia, US. In October 2025 the film was screened for Flinders University criminology staff and students, and Australian and New Zealand Society of Criminology members, followed by a Q&A. The film was scheduled for screening on ABC TV and ABC iview on 1 December 2025, but was pulled from the schedule on the day due to an editorial issue. It was rescheduled and screened on 22 December 2025, also becoming available on ABC iview.

On 6 December 2025, it was nominated for several AACTA Awards in the 15th AACTA Awards, to be awarded in February 2026: Best Documentary; Best Original Music Score in a Documentary (Amanda Brown); and Best Sound in a Documentary (Tom Heuzenroeder).

==== Ongoing work ====
In March 2025, after being on the waitlist for years, Almond, along with frequent collaborator producer Katrina Lucas, took up a tenancy at the Adelaide Studios in Glenside.

=== Theatre ===
In 2006, Almond was assistant director for a production of Waiting for Godot by the State Theatre Company of South Australia.

From 2020 to 2022, Almond was responsible for the filmmaking aspect of a performance developed by Emma Beech during a creative development residency at Vitalstatistix theatre company in Port Adelaide. There were work-in-progress showings of The Photo Box in April 2021, Photo Box was commissioned by Brink Productions and Vitalstatistix, and presented as part of the 2022 Adelaide Festival in March 2022.

In September 2021, she was filmmaker on the theatre production Me, My Dad and the Holy Ghost at Rumpus in Bowden, in which Katrina Lucas performed.

== Other activities ==
On 22 August 2024, as part of the 13th edition of the Artists on the Inside exhibition, Almond was a panel member for a discussion held by the Bob Hawke Prime Ministerial Centre and the Department for Correctional Services, titled "The art of desistance: Creativity, Culture and Vocational Pathways", facilitated by Rick Sarre.

On 19 July 2025, Almond curated a programme of music documentaries at the Mercury Cinema, as part of the inaugural "Supersonic" festival, created as part of the Illuminate Adelaide annual event in the city. The film programme ran from 6pm until 2am, under the title "Songs of the Revolution", and included Almond's film Songs Inside.
