= Nancy Bates (singer) =

Australian singer-songwriter

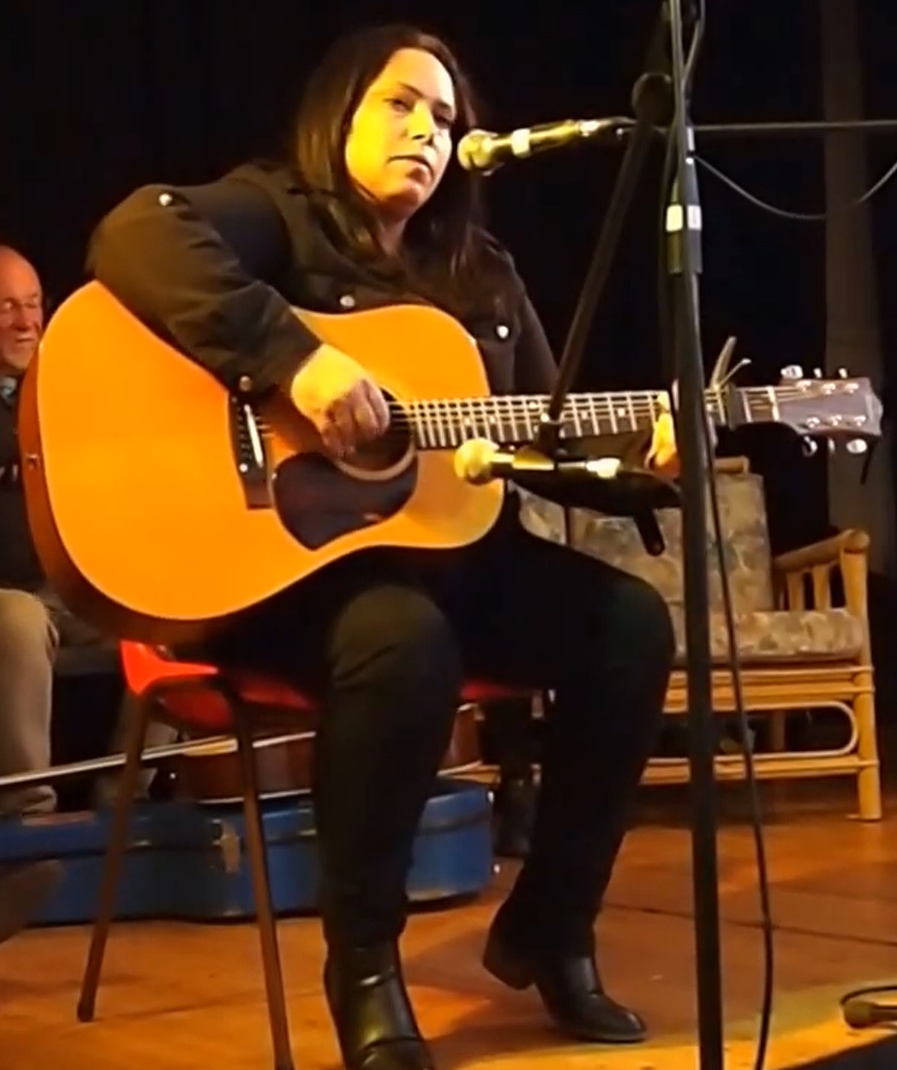
- At the Fleurieu Folk Festival in 2016
- Occupation: Singer-songwriter

Nancy Bates is an Aboriginal Australian singer-songwriter, guitarist, and teacher based in Adelaide. She is known for her music project Songs Inside, in which she taught inmates in a women's prison in Adelaide to sing, write songs, and play an instrument, which gave rise to a 2024 film of the same name by documentary filmmaker Shalom Almond. She is also known for her show Still Talkin' Bout A Revolution, based on the works of Tracy Chapman.

== Early life ==
Nancy Bates was born in far west New South Wales, near Broken Hill, of Barkindji / Wilyakali heritage.

== Career ==
Bates worked and toured with Archie Roach from 2013 until 2017, as a backing vocalist and guitarist, before starting to work with incarcerated women. In 2015, she sang Roach's song "Beautiful child" in duet with Ellie Lovegrove for the 25th Anniversary Edition of Charcoal Lane.

She has worked with and in Adelaide Women's Prison for many years, teaching inmates how to write songs, sing, and play the ukulele. Her project, later called Songs Inside, aimed at preventing vulnerable Indigenous women returning to prison after finishing their term. The women selected for the project were taught to play ukeleles, and assisted in writing songs. At the end of the program, some of the participants (the "Song Birds Ensemble") performed alongside Bates at an Australia Day concert, backed by the Adelaide Youth Orchestra. She said that she wanted to use her privilege to highlight women who had been incarcerated, not to celebrate Australia Day, but to promote discussion around the concept of Invasion Day or Survival Day, as it has become known by many Aboriginal people.

In March 2021 Bates performed her show with a backing band, Talkin' Bout a Revolution, based on the work of African American singer-songwriter Tracy Chapman, at the Adelaide Fringe. In March 2022, Bates showcased her new show Still Talkin' Bout A Revolution at the Adelaide Fringe, which won the Best Music award there. In July 2023, she performed the show at Theatre Royal in Hobart, Tasmania, as part of the Festival of Voices. In November 2024, she toured regional towns in South Australia with the show. Side by side with the tour, she gave workshops to developing songwriters.

Also at the 2022 Adelaide Fringe, she created the soundtrack for a huge performance piece called Sky Song, with the music of Archie Roach, Allara, Corey Theatre, Aimee Volkofsky, and Electric Fields.

In July 2024, Bates, along with Indigenous Mapuche Chilean-Australian singer and guitarist LENI, gave a concert in Prospect town hall, Adelaide, as part of NAIDOC Week celebrations.

In early March 2025, she launched her new album, Share Your Love at a concert titled "Nancy Bates & Friends", at the Arts Theatre in Adelaide, as part of the Adelaide Fringe. On 15 March, she performed at the Umeewarra Downtown Aboriginal Music Festival in Port Augusta, a festival headlined by Troy Cassar-Daley and Dem Mob. In October 2025, she performed at the Adelaide Guitar Festival, opening for Troy Cassar-Daley, with her band and special guests, Melody Pool and Ellie Lovegrove. showcasing songs from Share Your Love. She shared a message from prison reform activist Tabitha Lean, and told the audience about the Aboriginal-led organisation prisoner-advocacy group Sisters Inside.

== Other activities ==
Bates runs her own music promotion, education, and advocacy company for emerging First Nations artists, Deadly Management.

She continues to advocate for imprisoned women. She is also a strong mental health advocate, and in 2023 was ambassador to the Australian Performing Rights Association.

Bates was an ambassador for the Adelaide Fringe in 2025, which she saw as her "responsibility as an artist to uphold our values, to promote creativity, to promote the arts, to promote the Fringe".

== Film ==
In 2024, Adelaide documentary filmmaker Shalom Almond accompanied Bates to the prison over a period of months, and made a feature documentary film called Songs Inside, which won several awards.

== Recognition and awards ==
In March 2022, her show Still Talkin' Bout A Revolution won Best Live Music at the Adelaide Fringe. Bates was a finalist in the 2021 Australian Women in Music Awards (which were postponed until May 2022), in the Humanitarian Award category.

In 2023, she was awarded the Critics' Choice Star on the Adelaide Festival Centre Walk of Fame for her show Still Talkin' Bout A Revolution.

In March 2024, Bates was announced as one of two Indigenous artists-in-residence at the Sydney Conservatorium of Music, along with Tim Gray, a member of reggae fusion group Green Hand Band. In its second iteration of the programme, the two musicians mentor Aboriginal and Torres Strait Islander students and collaborate with Sydney Conservatorium students and staff in the creation of original music.

== Personal life ==
Bates' partner James, who had also been her manager, died from aesophageal cancer after they had only been together a few years. Her song, "We Won't Lose", written as a tribute to him, won a South Australian music songwriting award and progressed to a national competition.
