= Vadiveloo =

Vadiveloo is a surname. Notable people with the surname include:

- David Vadiveloo, Australian film director and lawyer
- G. Vadiveloo (1932–2024), Malaysian politician
