= AACTA Screen Content Innovation Award =

Former Australian media award

Screen Content Innovation Award AACTA Award
- Country: Australia
- Presented by: Australian Academy of Cinema and Television Arts (AACTA)
- First award: 2009
- Currently held by: Sam Doust, Meena Tharmarajah and Astrid Scott - Gallipoli: The First Day (2009)
- Website: http://www.aacta.org

The AACTA Screen Content Innovation Award is a special award presented by the Australian Academy of Cinema and Television Arts (AACTA) for "creativity within the screen industry" through the "successful employment of new media tools to either extend traditional formats or develop new formats, and in so doing create more rewarding and engaging audience experiences." The award was first presented by the Australian Film Institute (AFI) at the Australian Film Institute Awards (known commonly as the AFI Awards), before the academy was formed in 2011. The award, which was first presented in 2009, and again in 2011, is handed out at the discretion of the academy.

== Winners ==
Year	Recipient(s)	Production
2009 (51st)	Sam Doust, Meena Tharmarajah and Astrid Scott	Gallipoli: The First Day

== See also ==
- AACTA Awards
