= List of 2009 box office number-one films in Australia =

This is a list of films which made the most Australian dollars at the weekend box office during 2009.

== Number-one films ==
†	This implies the highest-grossing movie of the year.

#	Weekend end date	Film	Total weekend gross	Openings
1	4 January 2009	Yes Man	$4,165,840	Bolt (#4); Marley & Me (#5).
2	11 January 2009	Yes Man	$2,401,237	Seven Pounds (#2); The Tale of Despereaux (#12); Igor (#19).
3	18 January 2009	Bride Wars	$3,129,086	Role Models (#2); Hotel for Dogs (#8); Doubt (#14); The Wrestler (#16).
4	25 January 2009	Valkyrie	$1,946,778	Gran Torino (#3); Underworld: Rise of the Lycans (#4); Revolutionary Road (#9).
5	1 February 2009	Gran Torino	$1,938,124	Milk (#16); The Spirit (#17).
6	8 February 2009	Gran Torino	$1,631,703	Transporter 3 (#3); Changeling (#4); Pride and Glory (#19).
7	15 February 2009	He's Just Not That Into You	$4,696,514	Ghost Town (#3); My Bloody Valentine 3D (#6); Rachel Getting Married (#16).
8	22 February 2009	He's Just Not That Into You	$2,530,622	The International (#2); Zack and Miri Make a Porno (#6); The Reader (#7).
9	1 March 2009	He's Just Not That Into You	$1,571,324	The Unborn (#4); Last Chance Harvey(#6); The Combination (#12); W. (#20).
10	8 March 2009	Watchmen	$3,584,253	New in Town (#5); The Secret Life of Bees (#16); Dean Spanley (#19).
11	15 March 2009	Confessions of a Shopaholic	$2,749,412	Notorious (#4); Friday the 13th (#5); Easy Virtue (#8); Love the Beast (#11).
12	22 March 2009	Confessions of a Shopaholic	$1,641,750	Paul Blart: Mall Cop (#2); Duplicity (#3); 12 Rounds (#7); Two Fists, One Heart (#15); Blindness (#20).
13	29 March 2009	Knowing	$2,035,276	The Uninvited (#5); Bottle Shock (#15).
14	5 April 2009	Monsters vs. Aliens	$3,875,854	The Pink Panther 2 (#4); Inkheart (#7); Summer Hours (#16).
15	12 April 2009	17 Again	$3,138,224	The Boat That Rocked (#3); Race to Witch Mountain (#4); Dragonball Evolution (#6); Mary and Max (#13); Elegy (#15).
16	19 April 2009	Fast & Furious	$7,996,484	No new films in the top 20.
17	26 April 2009	Fast & Furious	$3,030,528	The Boy in the Striped Pajamas (#5); Fired Up (#7); Tulpan (#20).
18	3 May 2009	X-Men Origins: Wolverine	$6,617,733	Defiance (#3); Iron Maiden: Flight 666 (#12); Tenderness (#18).
19	10 May 2009	Star Trek	$4,657,564	Ghosts of Girlfriends Past (#3); Samson and Delilah (#9); Der Baader Meinhof Komplex (#15); Synecdoche, New York (#20).
20	17 May 2009	Angels & Demons	$5,200,845	Observe and Report (#5); Jonas Brothers: The 3D Concert Experience (#11); Gomorra (#13).
21	24 May 2009	Night at the Museum: Battle of the Smithsonian	$4,733,269	What Just Happened (#10); Warren Miller's Children of Winter (#12); Lesbian Vampire Killers (#15).
22	31 May 2009	Night at the Museum: Battle of the Smithsonian	$3,356,034	State of Play (#3); My Year Without Sex (#9); Adventureland (#15).
23	7 June 2009	Terminator Salvation	$7,740,052	I Love You, Man (#3); Is Anybody There? (#11); Two Lovers (#17).
24	14 June 2009	The Hangover	$3,442,920	Land of the Lost (#3); Sunshine Cleaning (#10); The Merchant of Venice (#20).
25	21 June 2009	The Proposal	$3,497,584	Year One (#3); Disgrace (#11).
26	28 June 2009	Transformers: Revenge of the Fallen	$13,647,361	Hannah Montana: The Movie (#4); Coco avant Chanel (#8); New York (#13); Wake in Fright (#20).
27	5 July 2009	Transformers: Revenge of the Fallen	$6,269,589	Ice Age: Dawn of the Dinosaurs (#2); Kambakkht Ishq (#11); Last Ride (#15).
28	12 July 2009	Brüno	$5,861,291	The Fox and the Child (#19).
29	19 July 2009	Harry Potter and the Half-Blood Prince †	$14,330,931	My Life in Ruins (#7); My Friends, My Loves (#18).
30	26 July 2009	Harry Potter and the Half-Blood Prince †	$6,462,870	Drag Me to Hell (#4), Cheri (#10), Red Cliff (#11), The Limits of Control (#17).
31	2 August 2009	Public Enemies	$3,151,046	My Sister's Keeper (#3), Love Aaj Kal (#12), Cedar Boys (#17).
32	9 August 2009	The Ugly Truth	$3,303,733	G.I. Joe: The Rise of Cobra (#2), Coraline (#6), Beautiful Kate (#9).
33	16 August 2009	The Ugly Truth	$2,286,545	District 9 (#2), Orphan (#8), Bandslam (#9), Balibo (#11), Kaminey (#14).
34	23 August 2009	Inglourious Basterds	$3,058,434	Dance Flick (#9), The September Issue (#12), Subdivision (#17), Adam (#18).
35	30 August 2009	Inglourious Basterds	$2,126,777	The Taking of Pelham 123 (#2), The Young Victoria (#4), Fighting (#8), Ponyo (#13), Taking Woodstock (#19).
36	6 September 2009	Up	$2,111,655	Aliens in the Attic (#4), Charlie & Boots (#5), The Soloist (#9).
37	13 September 2009	Up	$2,567,822	Funny People (#2), Push (#8), Sorority Row (#11).
38	20 September 2009	Up	$3,387,603	(500) Days of Summer (#3), G-Force (#5), Dil Bole Hadippa! (#15).
39	27 September 2009	Up	$3,490,738	Fame (#2), Surrogates (#3), Looking for Eric (#14).
40	4 October 2009	Up	$3,042,822	Mao's Last Dancer (#2), Wake Up Sid (#18).
41	11 October 2009	Couples Retreat	$2,971,485	Julie & Julia (#4), Whip It (#7), Moon (#14).
42	18 October 2009	The Final Destination	$2,089,606	Astro Boy (#6), Whatever Works (#12), Blue (#16), Departures (#20).
43	25 October 2009	Couples Retreat	$1,300,748	Saw VI (#4), All About Steve (#7), An Education (#9),
44	1 November 2009	Michael Jackson's This Is It	$3,701,314	The Imaginarium of Doctor Parnassus (#4), The Box (#8), London Dreams (#19).
45	8 November 2009	Michael Jackson's This Is It	$1,878,725	The Time Traveller's Wife (#2), A Christmas Carol (#3), Case 39 (#12), Genova (#14), Capitalism: A Love Story (#15), Ajab Prem Ki Ghazab Kahani (#16).
46	15 November 2009	2012	$6,075,162	The Boys Are Back (#5), Amelia (#8), Heer Ranjha (#20).
47	22 November 2009	The Twilight Saga: New Moon	$16,099,648	A Serious Man (#8), Kurbaan (#14), Amreeka (#20).
48	29 November 2009	The Twilight Saga: New Moon	$6,029,668	Cloudy with a Chance of Meatballs (#3), The Invention of Lying (#4), De Dana Dan (#12), Topp Twins' Untouchable Girls (#19).
49	6 December 2009	Paranormal Activity	$2,710,512	Where the Wild Things Are (#3), Zombieland (#6), The Informant! (#8), Paa (#20).
50	13 December 2009	Paranormal Activity	$1,644,039	Planet 51 (#7), 9 (#11), Away We Go (#13), Rocket Singh: Salesman of the Year (#17).
51	20 December 2009	Avatar	$11,962,308	Broken Embraces (#11).
52	28 December 2009	Avatar	$12,349,526	Sherlock Holmes (#2), Alvin and the Chipmunks: The Squeakquel (#3), Old Dogs (#4), Did You Hear About the Morgans? (#5), The Lovely Bones (#7), Nowhere Boy (#14), The French Kissers (#19).

- The week ending 28 December ended in a long weekend.

== See also ==
- List of Australian films – Australian films by year
