= David Vadiveloo =

Australian lawyer

David Selvarajah Vadiveloo
- Education: Bachelor of Law, Bachelor of Arts, Grad. Dip. Film & Television
- Alma mater: Monash University, Victorian College of the Arts
- Occupations: Lawyer, Human rights & Education consultant, Screen Producer
- Employer: Community Prophets Pty Ltd
- Spouse: Rachel Naŋinaaq Edwardson
- Children: 3
- Parent(s): Victor Kandiah and Anne Vadiveloo

David Selvarajah Vadiveloo is an education reformer, cultural safety consultant and retired lawyer.

Vadiveloo received the 2005 Australian Human Rights Commission Award for Individual Community Achievement and was the youngest person to be Highly Commended for the Australian Human Rights Medal, recognising lifelong commitment and achievements in human rights. Vadiveloo retired as the Superintendent of Schools for the North Slope Borough School District in 2026. Vadiveloo was the Founder and Executive Director of the media and education agency Community Prophets. He led the cultural safety and culturally responsive practice reform in schools in Victoria's juvenile justice system and previously consulted to First Nations community and commercial organisations in Australia and North America, including the Mirarr Gundjeihmi Aboriginal Corporation and the Iñupiat Education Department in Alaska. Vadiveloo's films have also been nominated for Australian Film Institute Awards in both the drama and documentary categories.

Vadiveloo is married to Iñupiat screen producer, education consultant and cultural broker Rachel Naŋinaaq Edwardson.

== Early life and education ==
Vadiveloo was born in Wagga Wagga, Australia, to a Tamil father and Anglo-Celtic mother. He holds a Bachelor of Laws and Bachelor of Arts from Monash University, Melbourne, Australia and a Graduate Diploma in Film and Television from the Victorian College of the Arts at University of Melbourne, Australia.

== Awards ==
Vadiveloo's work in human rights, media and culturally responsive education saw him awarded the 2005 Australian Human Rights Commission Award for Individual Community Achievement, specifically for his work with Indigenous and marginalised peoples. In 2005 he was also the youngest person to be Highly Commended for the Australian Human Rights Medal, recognising lifelong commitment and achievements in human rights. Vadiveloo's films and interactive screenworks have also received numerous nominations and awards including the 2002 Canadian Golden Sheaf Award for Best International Documentary, the 2005 Australian Interactive Media Industry Association Award for Best Interactive Learning and 2009 Australian Film Institute nominations in both Drama and Documentary.

== Career ==
=== Legal and human rights career ===
Vadiveloo began work as a solicitor and barrister in the Northern Territory of Australia in 1994. He worked on the successful Central Land Council native title application, Hayes v Northern Territory, brought by the Arrernte people of the Alice Springs region.

In 1996, Vadiveloo was a policy advisor to the Federal Race Discrimination Commissioner of the Australian Human Rights Commission. He facilitated national community consultations with Indigenous and culturally and linguistically diverse (CALD) communities about the operation and effectiveness of the Australian Racial Discrimination Act. His consultations formed the basis of the 1996 State of the Nation Report.

Between 2001 and 2003 Vadiveloo worked alongside former Australian Human Rights Commissioner Chris Sidoti and Bill Barker, former Director of the Department of Foreign Affairs and Trade's Human Rights and Indigenous Issues section as a trainer in the Australia-Indonesia Specialised Training Project II, facilitating human rights training programs with Indonesian NGO's, military and government employees in areas of race discrimination, torture and conflict resolution.

Since 2007, Vadiveloo and wife Rachel Naninaaq Edwardson have facilitated culturally responsive practice and media programs in partnership with Indigenous and marginalised youth in the Northern Territory, Queensland, Victoria, NSW and Alaska. Their program in Cape York became the subject of the 2-part ABC Television documentary Voices From the Cape.

In 2008 at the request of the Legal Aid Commission of NSW, Vadiveloo and Edwardson devised and facilitated the Burn project with marginalised youth from linguistically and culturally diverse backgrounds in inner-city Sydney. The six-month project was a crime prevention initiative that resulted in the production of the Australian Film Institute nominated Burn film.

In 2013, Vadiveloo was Acting Chief Executive Officer of the Gundjeihmi Aboriginal Corporation. On behalf of the Corporation he drafted the landmark research agreement used for the Madjedbebe archaeological excavation which has changed the scientifically accepted date of modern human occupation in Australia.

In 2015 Vadiveloo and Edwardson devised and facilitated a culturally responsive education pilot program for youth in custody at the Parkville Youth Justice Facility in Melbourne, Australia. The program included a number of artists such as Archie Roach, Radical Son and Abdul Abdullah. and resulted in culturally responsive practice being explicitly incorporated into the pedagogy for schools in youth justice facilities in the State of Victoria.

=== Film career ===
In 1998, after completing the Victorian College of the Arts Film and Television post-graduate degree, Vadiveloo returned to Alice Springs and established a media program at the Irrkerlantye Learning Centre, working with Aboriginal children from the Town Camps of Alice Springs and re-engaging them with schooling through media.

Vadiveloo's documentary Trespass (2002), about the Mirrar leader Yvonne Margarula and her battle to stop the Jabiluka mine site, won multiple awards and his documentary Beyond Sorry (2004) about Australia's Stolen Generations premiered on Australia's ABC Television and was screened at the 2004 Sydney Film Festival.

Vadiveloo directed and co-produced Us Mob (2005), the first Aboriginal children's television series in Australia and the first interactive Indigenous television series in the world.

Two films written and directed by Vadiveloo were nominated at the 2009 Australian Film Institute Awards: the half-hour crime drama Burn (created with at-risk inner city youth) was nominated for Best Short Fiction Film and Voices from the Cape (which documented a program run by his company Community Prophets in the Aboriginal community of Aurukun in Cape York, Australia) was nominated for best documentary series. Vadiveloo received Best Director nominations for both films at the Australian Directors Guild Awards in 2010.

Vadiveloo founded the media and education agency Community Prophets in 2005. The company facilitated culturally responsive practice reform and produced and taught film and television in partnership with marginalised communities.

== Filmography ==
- 2012 Project Chariot – Producer, Editor (Dir: Rachel Naŋinaaq Edwardson)
- 2012 Songline to Happiness – Producer (Dir: Danny Teece-Johnson)
- 2009 The Voice of our Spirit – Editor (Dir: Rachel Naŋinaaq Edwardson)
- 2008 Voices from the Cape – Writer, Director, co-Producer
- 2008 Burn – Writer, Director
- 2005 Us Mob – Writer, Director, co-Producer
- 2004 Beyond Sorry – Writer, Director, Producer
- 2002 Bush Bikes – Writer, Director, Producer
- 2002 Jabiru 0886: Trespass Writer, Director, co-Producer
- 2001 Tales from a suitcase series 2 - Writer, Director
- 2001 Trespass - Director, Producer
- 1999 Iwerre Atherrame - Writer, Director

== Bibliography ==
- Vadiveloo, David (2007). "A time for empowerment or a new digital divide? " in da Rimini, Francesca and d/Lux/MediaArts "A Handbook for Coding Cultures" (2007)
- Ginsburg, Faye (2006) "Rethinking the Digital Age" in Toynbee, Jason & Hesmondhalgh, David (2008) "The media and social theory" p136
