= CinefestOZ =

Annual film festival in Western Australia

- Location: South West region, Western Australia
- Founded: 2008; 18 years ago
- Website: cinefestoz.com

CinefestOZ is an annual film festival that takes place over five days in the South West region of Western Australia. IndigifestOZ is a section of the festival devoted to Aboriginal and Torres Strait Islander filmmakers. The CinefestOZ Film Prize of A$100,000 is the richest film prize in the country.

== History ==
The CinefestOZ film festival was founded in 2008 by David Barton and Helen Shervington, "as a cultural celebration of the French bicentenary of Antipodean exploration of the South West corner of Western Australia". The opening film at the inaugural festival was the highly-acclaimed Australian film Black Balloon.

The inaugural CinefestOZ Film Prize was awarded in 2014. Worth A$100,000 as of 2023, it is the richest film prize in the country.

In July 2023 it was announced that funding for the festival would continue for at least a further three years, until 2025.

== Description ==
The events are staged in Busselton, the Margaret River wine region, Bunbury, Dunsborough, and Augusta. The festival showcases Australian and French films. As of 2023 it is a 6-day event.

The festival awards the CinefestOZ Film Prize of A$100,000, to feature films and documentaries first screened in Western Australia. The CinefestOZ prize is the largest cash film prize in Australia, and one of the largest in the world, and is decided by a jury of five Australian and international filmmakers. The festival has staged IndigifestOZ since 2015, which provides a showcase for Aboriginal and Torres Strait Islander filmmakers, screened for free as "Community Days".

The film festival is supported by Tourism Western Australia, Screenwest, Lotterywest, and Screen Australia. Chair of the festival as of 2023 is Margaret Buswell.

== Recent editions ==
The 2021 festival was the 14th edition, taking place from 25 to 29 August 2021. The feature documentary film Under the Volcano, produced by WA producer Cody Greenwood and directed by Gracie Otto, had its Australian premiere at the festival, while Akoni, a film about a Nigerian refugee struggling to integrate into Australian society by Australian filmmaker Genna Chanelle Hayes, had its world premiere. The Australian drama film Nitram, based on the 1996 Port Arthur massacre, won the 2021 Film Prize.

For the 16th edition in 2023, the awards jury was chaired by Australian director Robert Connolly, with production designer (Game of Thrones, The Matrix) Deborah Riley; South Park producer Debbie Liebling; and actors Mia Wasikowska and Rob Collins the other members. Four films competed for the prize: Matt Vesely's Monolith; Noora Niasari's Shayda; Mark Leonard Winter's The Rooster; and Bromley: Light After Dark. Shayda won the prize.

== CinefestOZ Film Prize winners ==
- 2014 - Paper Planes
- 2015 - Putuparri and the Rainmakers
- 2016 - Girl Asleep
- 2017 - Ali's Wedding
- 2018 - Jirga
- 2019 - H Is for Happiness
- 2021 - Nitram (dir. Justin Kurzel)
- 2022 - Of an Age
- 2023 - Shayda (dir. Noora Niasari)
- 2024 – The Moogai (dir. Jon Bell)
- 2025 – Songs Inside (dir Shalom Almond)
