= 2021 Australian Women in Music Awards =

Edition of annual Australian Women in Music Awards

- Date: 19 May 2022
- Venue: Brisbane Powerhouse, Brisbane, Queensland
- Website: womeninmusicawards.com.au

The 2021 Australian Women in Music Awards was the third Australian Women in Music Awards. Originally scheduled to take place in October 2021, the event was postponed to 19 May 2022.

== Description ==
The event was scheduled to take place on 5 and 6 October 2021 but on 31 August 2021, it was (for the second year in a row) postponed to 19 May 2022, owing to the COVID-19 pandemic and the heightened vulnerability of First Nations artists to the virus.

Awards were presented in 17 categories, two more than in 2019, with the inaugural Tina Arena Special Impact Award and Live Production Touring Awards being added. Nominations opened on 25 May 2021 and closed on 6 July. The Tina Arena Special Impact Award named after Tina Arena, honours an unsung champion whose personal journey, contribution and service to industry has had an extensive impact on the Australian music community as a whole.

Queensland premier Annastacia Palaszczuk expressed her excitement about the event, which is supported by the Queensland Government.

The finalists were announced on 31 August 2021.

== AWMA Honour Roll ==
- Olivia Newton-John

== Nominees and winners ==
=== AWMA Awards ===
Winners indicated in boldface, with other nominees in plain.

Full list of nominees
Lifetime Achievement Award	Humanitarian Award
**Deborah Cheetham**; Kate Ceberano; Keri McInerney	**Leigh Carriage**; Nancy Bates; Gemma Farrell
Diversity in Music Award	Studio Production Award
**Eliza Hull**; Mindy Meng Wang; Alice Ivy	**Alice Ivy**; Antonia Gauci; Becki Whitton
Live Creative Production Award	Live Production Touring Award
**Kait Hall**; Annie Peterson; Jenny Moon	**Casey O'Shaughnessy**; Sophie Kirov; Fanny Lumsden
Music Leadership Award	Songwriter Award
**Sahara Herald**; Marianna Annas; Jodie Feld	**Tania Doko**; Dami Im; Lisa Young
Music Photographer Award	Film-maker Award
**Cybele Malinowski**; Brittany Long; Michelle Pitiris	**Lucy Knox**; Aimée-Lee Xu Hsien Curran; Natalie van den Dungen
Artistic Excellence Award	Creative Leadership Award
**Elena Kats-Chernin**; Katie Noonan; Eve Klein	**Emily Ulman**; Annie Peterson; Vanessa Hughes
Excellence in Classical Music Award	Music Journalist Award
**Genevieve Lacey**; Elena Kats-Chernin; Celia Craig	**Poppy Reid**; Jane Gazzo; Sosefina Fuamoli
Excellence in Image Making Award	Emerging Artist Award
**Cindy Vogels**	**Martha Marlow**; GLVES; Vanessa Perica
Tina Arena Special Impact Award	
**Dina Bassile**; Sahara Herald; Sonja Horbelt	
