= AACTA Award for Best Documentary Under One Hour =

Australian documentary award

Best Documentary Under One Hour AACTA Award
- Country: Australia
- Presented by: Australian Academy of Cinema and Television Arts (AACTA)
- First award: 2009
- Currently held by: Jandamarra's War (2011)
- Website: http://www.aacta.org

The AACTA Award for Best Documentary Under One Hour, is a non-feature film award presented by the Australian Academy of Cinema and Television Arts (AACTA) to the producer of an Australian documentary that is "a self-contained non-fiction film or Television Program equal to or less than 60 minutes in duration that is a creative treatment of actuality other than a news, current affairs, sports coverage, magazine, infotainment or light entertainment program." Prior to the establishment of the academy in 2011, the award was presented by the Australian Film Institute (AFI) at the annual Australian Film Institute Awards (more commonly known as the AFI Awards) from 2009 to 2010. A single award for Best Documentary was handed out from 1958 to 2008, before it was split into three categories: Best Feature Length Documentary, Best Documentary Under One Hour and Best Documentary Series. The award is presented at the AACTA Awards Luncheon, a black tie event which celebrates achievements in film production, television, documentaries and short films.

== Winners and nominees ==
In the following table, winners are listed first, in boldface and highlighted in gold; those listed below the winner that are not in boldface or highlighted are the nominees.

Winner

=== AFI Awards (2009-2010) ===
Year	Film	Producer(s)	Network
**2009** (51st)	**Solo**	**Jennifer Peedom**	**ABC1**
2009 (51st)	The Love Market	Shalom Almond	National Geographic Channel
2009 (51st)	Salt	Michael Angus	ABC
2009 (51st)	Tackling Peace	Mark Radomsky	Network Ten
**2010** (52nd)	**You Only Live Twice - The Incredibly True Story of the Hughes Family**	**Ruth Cullen**	**ABC1**
2010 (52nd)	A Thousand Encores: The Ballets Russes in Australia	Sharyn Prentice, Marianne Latham and Lavinia Riachi	ABC
2010 (52nd)	Rudely Interrupted	Susie Jones and Benjamin Jones	ABC1
2010 (52nd)	Surviving Mumbai	Andrew Ogilvie and Andrea Quesnelle	ABC

=== AACTA Awards (2012) ===
Year	Film	Producer(s)	Network
**2011** **(1st)**	**Jandamarra's War**	**Andrew Ogilvie**, **Andrea Quesnelle** and **Eileen Torres**	**ABC1**
2011 (1st)	The Ball	Yael Bergman, Laura Waters and Jessica Leski	ABC1
2011 (1st)	Leaky Boat	Penny Chapman	ABC1
2011 (1st)	Orchids: My Intersex Adventure	Phoebe Hart	ABC

== See also ==
- AACTA Awards
