= AACTA Award for Best Documentary Series =

Australian documentary award

Best Documentary Series AACTA Award
- Country: Australia
- Presented by: Australian Academy of Cinema and Television Arts (AACTA)
- First award: 2009
- Currently held by: SAS - The Search for Warriors (2011)
- Website: http://www.aacta.org

The AACTA Award for Best Documentary Series, is a non-feature film award presented by the Australian Academy of Cinema and Television Arts (AACTA) to the producer of an Australian documentary series that is "a Television Program consisting of a potentially unlimited number of episodes but not less than 2 that is a creative treatment of actuality other than a news, current affairs, sports coverage, magazine, infotainment or light entertainment program." Prior to the establishment of the Academy in 2011, the award was presented by the Australian Film Institute (AFI) at the annual Australian Film Institute Awards (more commonly known as the AFI Awards) from 2009 to 2010. A single award for Best Documentary was handed out from 1958 to 2008, before it was split into three categories: Best Feature Length Documentary, Best Documentary Under One Hour and Best Documentary Series. The award is presented at the AACTA Awards Luncheon, a black tie event which celebrates achievements in film production, television, documentaries and short films.

== Winners and nominees ==
In the following table, winners are listed first, in boldface and highlighted in gold; those listed below the winner that are not in boldface or highlighted are the nominees.

Winner

=== AFI Awards (2009-2010) ===
Year	Film	Producer(s)	Network
**2009** (51st)	**First Australians**	**Darren Dale, Rachel Perkins, Helen Panckhurst**	**SBS**
2009 (51st)	Beyond Kokoda	Stig Schnell and Shaun Gibbons	Foxtel
2009 (51st)	Once Bitten	Beth Frey and Janette Howe	SBS
2009 (51st)	Voices from the Cape	David Selvarajah Vadiveloo and Anna Kaplan	ABC1
**2010** (52nd)	**Liberal Rule - The Politics That Changed Australia**	**Nick Torrens and Frank Haines**	**SBS**
2010 (52nd)	Addicted to Money	Andrew Ogilvie and Andrea Quesnelle	ABC
2010 (52nd)	Disable Bodied Sailors	Karina Holden and Nick Robinson	SBS
2010 (52nd)	Kokoda	Andrew Wiseman	ABC1

=== AACTA Awards (2012-present) ===
Year	Film	Producer(s)	Network
**2011** **(1st)**	**SAS - The Search for Warriors**	**Julia Redwood** and **Ed Punchard**	**SBS**
2011 (1st)	Immigration Nation, The Secret History of Us	Jacob Hickey, Alex West and Lucy Maclaren	SBS
2011 (1st)	Outback Fight Club	Paul Scott and Isabel Perez	SBS
2011 (1st)	Outback Kids	Mike Bluett, Mark Hamlyn and Marc Radomsky	ABC1

== See also ==
- AACTA Awards
