= Leigh Carriage =

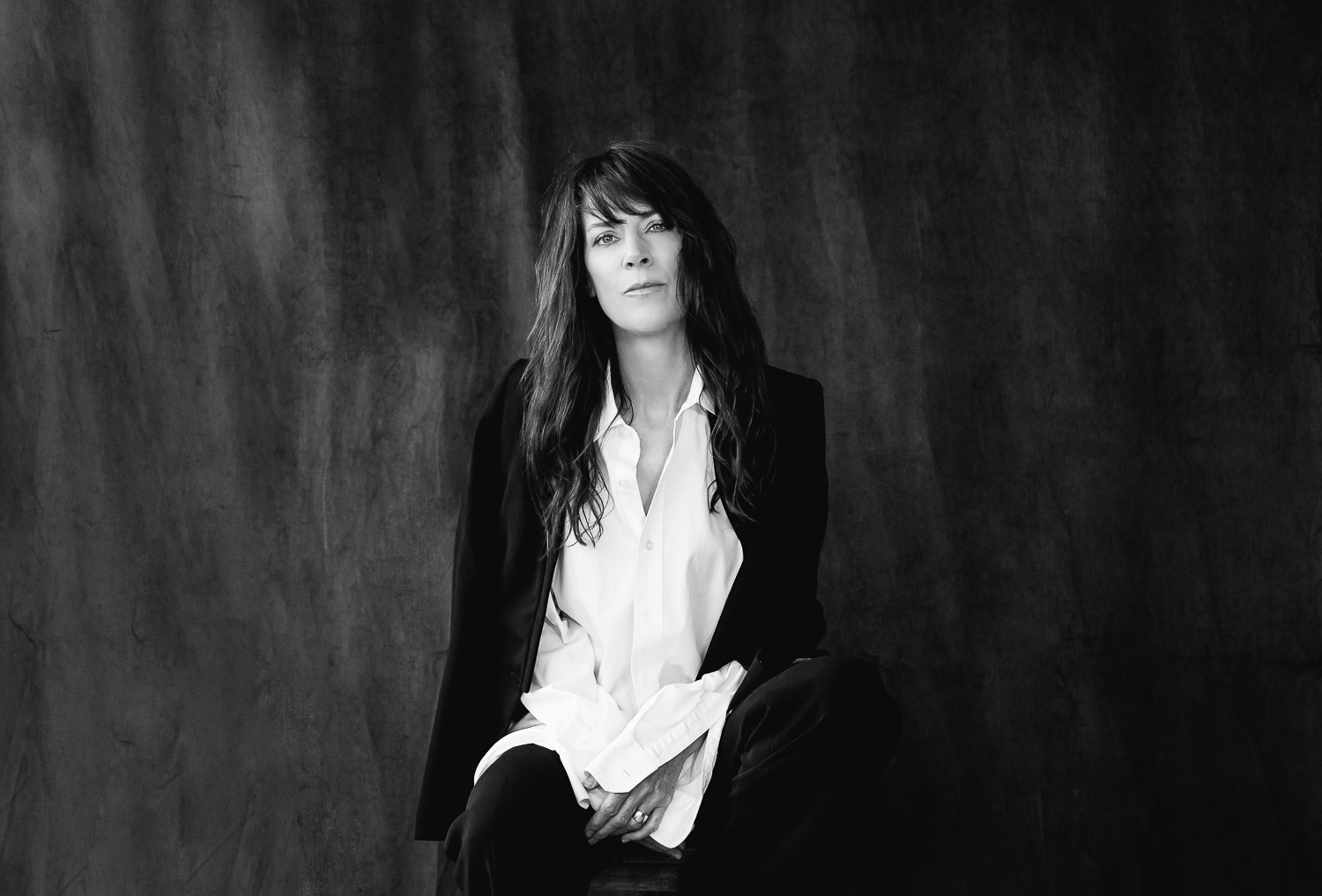
Leigh Carriage. Photo by Kate Holmes.

Leigh Carriage is an Australian vocalist, educator and songwriter. Her festival performances include the Monterey Jazz Festival, Wangaratta Jazz and Blues Festival, Melbourne Women’s Jazz Festival, Brisbane International Jazz Festival and the Brisbane Festival. Carriage's 2013 album Mandarin Skyline, mixed and mastered by Grammy Award winner Helik Hadir, was nominated for a National Australian Jazz Bell Award, and Weave (2016) won NCEIA Album of the Year.

Carriage is a senior lecturer in the Contemporary Music Program at Southern Cross University, where she has specialised in songwriting, arranging, vocal pedagogy and ensemble direction since 1998. Since 1999 Carriage has coordinated a Visiting Artists mentoring program for Women in Contemporary Music, and the APRA AMCOS Songwriting Workshop Series for 17 years. In 2009, Carriage was awarded a Citation for Outstanding Contribution to Student Learning by the Vice Chancellor, and in 2019 she was nominated for an Impact Award for Professional Service. She was awarded a PhD in Composition from The University of Sydney Conservatorium of Music for a dissertation that broadly encompassed her research interests in composition, performance, improvisation, collaboration and recording. In 2022 Leigh was awarded the Australian Women in Music - Humanitarian Award.

== Discography ==
=== as leader ===
- Weave (2016): Independent - winner of Album of the Year - NCEIA Jazz Category Review
- Mandarin Skyline (2013): Vitamin Records - (national and international reviews).
- Get Out Of Town (2012): Vitamin Records.
- On Impulse (2006): [Live]:Independent reviewed in ABC Limelight Magazine (October Issue, 2006) by John Shand.
- Until (2004): Independent.
- Just Before Dawn (2000): Rosebank Records.
- Liquid (2000): Independent.

=== as contributor ===
- Jo Jo Smith, Live At The Blue Birdy (2009)
- Carl Cleves, Before Twilight Turns to Night (2018)

== Publications ==
=== Books ===
- Carriage, L. (2021) Weave: Complete transcriptions for piano and vocal. Wagtail Books, Australia.
- Carriage, L. (2021) Mandarin Skyline: Complete Piano and Vocal Transcriptions. Wagtail Books, Australia.

=== Book chapters ===
- Carriage, L. (2024). The Subtle Art of Resistance: Re-hearing the Music of Na Yoon-sun 나윤선 (Youn Sun Nah). In L. de Bruin (Ed.), Guerrilla Music: Musicking as Resistance, Defiance, and Subversion (pp. 213–226). Lexington Books. https://researchportal.scu.edu.au/esploro/outputs/bookChapter/The-Subtle-Art-of-Resistance/991013194013802368
- Heartlands: Kasey Chambers, Australian Country Music and Americana in Outback and Urban: Australian Country Music Volume 1. Australian Institute of Country Music Press: Gympie Queensland Australia

=== Journals ===
- Carriage, L. and Wren, T., (2021) The Jazz Social: Jazz performance during COVID. Perfect Beat, 21(2), pp. 159–164.
- Carriage, L. (2019) Hybridity in the Music of Youn Sun Nah: Directions in Jazz Vocal Style, Australian Voice, Vol. 20, p. 1–7.
- Carriage, L. (2008) Southern Cross welcomes Katie Noonan, Voice of Australian National Association of Teachers of Singing, Vol. 21, no. 2, p. 4–5.
- Carriage, L. (2000) The Experience of Contemporary Australian Female Vocalists: An Exploratory Study. Australian Voice. 6: 31–36

== Awards ==
- 2022 - Australian Women in Music Humanitarian Award https://womeninmusicawards.com.au/2022-recipients-finalists/
- 2019 - Nominated for Vice Chancellor’s Impact Award (Professional Service).
- 2016 - 'Weave' Album of the Year, North Coast Entertainment Industry Awards.
- 2014 - 'Mandarin Skyline' nominated for a National Bell Award Australia.
- 2009 - Citation for Outstanding Contribution to Student Learning. For the creation and establishment of an innovative equity program which provides exceptional support for music students in their development as original artists.

The Higher Education Equity Support Program (HEESP) initiated by Dr Carriage from 2000-2010 offered music students a program of national and international, female visiting artists, who provide mentorship and support through live performances, workshops, private lessons, and open forums. To complement the program, Dr Carriage also created and designed a website which provides additional information such as artist biographies, an alumni section, and links to relevant educational sites. The HEESP project supplements normal course tuition by scheduling artists to perform who are specialists in the musical genre in which the students are currently studying.

=== Australian Women in Music Awards ===
The Australian Women in Music Awards is an annual event that celebrates outstanding women in the Australian Music Industry who have made significant and lasting contributions in their chosen field. They commenced in 2018.

Year	Nominee / work	Award	Result
2021	Leigh Carriage	Humanitarian Award	Won
