= Lisa Young Quartet =

The Lisa Young Quartet is a jazz-world music quartet from Melbourne, Australia, led by a vocal artist and composer Lisa Young.

== Background ==
The LYQ quartet is composed of Young, Stephen Magnusson (guitar), Ben Robertson (double bass) and Dave Beck (drums). Their most recent work, The Eternal Pulse, is a wordless song-cycle featuring the intoned rhythmic recitation of konnakol, varieties of meter and subdivision, layering Indian elements, rhythmic textures and ensemble dialogue, in an evocative journey of sound and song. The quartet has released four albums, The Eternal Pulse, Grace, Speak and Transformation.

Young is also a founding member of an a cappella group, Coco's Lunch, which has recorded seven albums of original music. In 2003, Coco's Lunch won the award for 'Best Folk/World Song' at the Contemporary A Cappella Recording Awards, in the United States. At the ARIA Music Awards of 2007, Coco's Lunch received nominations in the category 'Best Children's Album' for Rat Trap Snap and in 'Best World Music Album' for Blueprint.

== Discography ==
=== Albums ===
- Transformation (1991)
- Speak (1999)
- Grace (2007)
- The Eternal Pulse (2012)
- Grace Special Edition (2014)

== Awards ==
Year	Nominee/Work	Award	Result
2007	Grace	Bell Award for Best Australian Jazz Vocal Album 2007	Won
2012	The Eternal Pulse	Bell Award for Best Australian Jazz Vocal Album	Nominated
2021	Sacred Stones (Lisa Young) for Massed choir, Gondwana National Choral School 2020, Lisa Young (conductor)	APRA Art Music Award for Work of the Year: Choral	Won

=== Australian Women in Music Awards ===
The Australian Women in Music Awards is an annual event that celebrates outstanding women in the Australian Music Industry who have made significant and lasting contributions in their chosen field. They commenced in 2018.

Year	Nominee / work	Award	Result
2021	Lisa Young	Songwriter Award	Nominated
