= Connected: The Power of Six Degrees =

2008 film

- Directed by: Annamaria Talas
- Written by: Annamaria Talas
- Produced by: Aline Jacques
- Starring: Kevin Bacon
- Release date: October 28, 2008 (Australia)
- Country: Australia

Connected: The Power of Six Degrees (alternate title: How Kevin Bacon Cured Cancer) is a 2008 documentary film by Annamaria Talas. It was first aired in 2009 on the Science Channel. The documentary introduces the audience to the main ideas of network science through the exploration of the concept of six degrees of separation. It was awarded the 2009 AFI Award for Best Editing in a Documentary.
