= Salt (2009 film) =

2009 Australian documentary short film

Salt is an Australian documentary short film by director Michael Angus and photographer Murray Fredericks. It debuted at the Adelaide Film Festival in 2009.

The film records Fredericks's annual solo trips to the salt flats of Lake Eyre in South Australia. He spends five weeks each year camping in the middle of the lake to contemplate and to take photographs of the peculiar landscape for his photographic series, also called Salt. The film intersperses time-lapse photography with still images from Fredericks's camera and footage from a video diary he records throughout the trip.

The film has won jury prizes at several film festivals, and was nominated for two prizes at the 51st Australian Film Institute Awards for "Best Cinematography in a Documentary" and "Best Documentary under one hour". The film won the award of Best Cinematography at the 2010 Byron Bay International Film Festival.It was first broadcast in the United States on the PBS independent film series P.O.V. in 2010.
