= Eraser Children =

- Directed by: Nathan Christoffel
- Written by: Nathan Christoffel
- Produced by: Colour Pictures
- Starring: Jasen Swafford; Rob Alec; David Macrae; Shane Nagle; Adam Camerlengo; Joshua Parnell; Fionn Napier Quinlan; Colin Masters; Steven Haar
- Cinematography: Adrian Kristoffersen
- Music by: Wojciech Golczewski
- Release date: 29 August 2009 (MUFF)
- Country: Australia
- Language: English
- Budget: A$10,000

Eraser Children is a 2009 Australian film directed by Nathan Christoffel.

The director talked about the film in an interview for Film Ink magazine in 2008.

The film has been selected to premiere at Londons Sci-Fi-London off the viewing of the first edit. Though the film was withdrawn from competition due to post production not being complete . The film has been selected to have a preview screening at the closing night of the Melbourne Underground Film Festival in August 2009. It will have its World Premiere as the opening night film of the Sydney International Sci Fi Film Festival.

Sydney International Sci Fi Film festival co-director Lisa Mitchell said. "Director Nathan Christoffel and his cast and crew, deserve to be warmly congratulated. To have independently produced such a visually and conceptually sophisticated film as their feature debut is a major accomplishment and a testament to the creativity of Australian genre cinema."

A trailer for the film was released in mid-2009.

An unfinished version of the film was first screened at the Melbourne Underound Film Festival in 2009. The film went on to win 'Best Australian Film' and 'Best supporting actor' – Shane Nagle at the festival awards.
