= Nathan Christoffel =

Australian film director (born 1982)

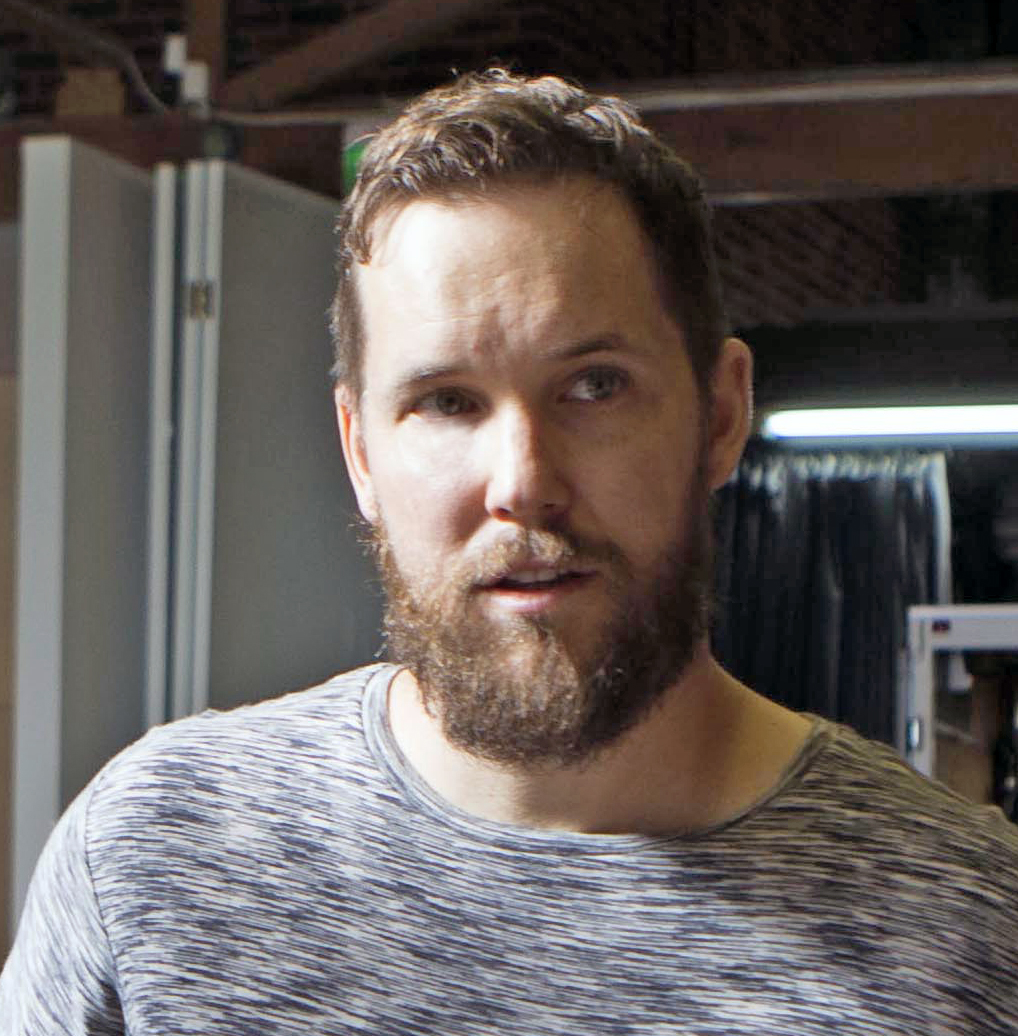
- Christoffel on set in 2017
- Born: Nathan James Christoffel; 20 August 1982 (age 44)
- Occupation: Film Director
- Years active: 2005–present

Nathan Christoffel is an Australian film director from Byron Bay, New South Wales.

In 2009 he completed his debut feature, Eraser Children (winner of 'Best Australian Film' and 'Best supporting actor' at the Melbourne Underground Film Festival 2009' and 'Best Australian Film' at FPFF 2009).

He is the owner of production company Picture Co which opened its Melbourne office in 2016.

== Film career ==
=== 2009: Eraser Children ===
A dystopian satire ' Eraser Children' had success on the festival circuit, screening at film festivals all around the world.

Short Synopsis

In a dystopia of useless products, pre-paid dreams, and a system of 'violations' so invasive that if you laugh too loudly you will be fined, Misner Corporation has invented a new source of energy, generating a monopoly on all facets of human existence. The world is now a totalitarian global state ruled by one man. Anyone unwilling to work for Misner's regime lives underground in a dark world of insane system 'dropouts'. Finnegan Wright, a lower level worker at Misner Corp. is taken on an enthralling journey when one of these dropouts kidnaps Finnegan and tries to convince him to change the fate of the world by killing Misner.

Sydney International Sci Fi Film festival co-director Lisa Mitchell said. "Director Nathan Christoffel and his cast and crew, deserve to be warmly congratulated. To have independently produced such a visually and conceptually sophisticated film as their feature debut is a major accomplishment and a testament to the creativity of Australian genre cinema".

The first screening of Eraser Children was a sell out screening of the unfinished film at the Melbourne Underground Film Festival in 2009. The Film went on to take the top award at that festival winning 'Best Australian Film' and 'Best Supporting Actor' Shane Nagle.

== Filmography ==
Short Films

Year	Title	Awards
2005	Silent Poison	Nominated for best film 'Reel Fest Film festival'
2006	Colourless	Winner 'Best Production', Reel Fest Film Festival 2006
2007	Water Me Before I Die	Nominated, Best Young Filmmaker of the year Byron Bay Film Festival 2007
2008	Rewind Rabbit	Finalist Babelgum Film Festival

Feature films

Year	Title	Awards
2009	Eraser Children	Winner Best Australian Film 'Melbourne Underground Film Festival' Winner Best Supporting Actor 'Melbourne Underground Film Festival' Winner Best Australian Film 'Sydney International Science Fiction Film Festival'

== General references ==
- Sidestreet interview with Christoffel 2010
- Screen Anarchy article on 1629 announcement
- A Night of Horror film festival chats to Christoffel and Co
- Eraser Children listing Sci Fi London
- Guardian article about UK screening of Eraser Children
- Article on campaign directed by Christoffel
