= Marissa Gibson =

Australian actress

Marissa Gibson (born c. 1995) is an Australian actress. She played the central role of Delilah in the 2009 film Samson and Delilah. The film won the Caméra d'Or award at the 2009 Cannes Film Festival and Best Film at the 2009 AFI Awards.

Gibson attended high school in Alice Springs, where she lived with her uncle, aunt and grandmother, Mitjili Napanangka Gibson, who portrayed her grandmother in the film. She left school in Year 11. Gibson speaks three languages, Warlpiri, Luritja and English, and learned some Japanese.

Gibson lived previously in Kintore where she experienced first hand the desolation of life in isolated communities that is portrayed in the film.

In 2012 Gibson had a child with her partner.

== Awards ==
- 2009: Deadly Awards: Female Actor of the Year - NOMINATED
- 2009: IF Awards: Best Actress - WON
- 2009: AFI Awards: Best Lead Actress - NOMINATED
- 2009: AFI Awards: Young Actor Award - JOINT WINNER
