= Mitjili Napanangka Gibson =

Australian actress

Mitjili Napanangka Gibson (1932 – 2011) was an Indigenous Australian artist and actress. Gibson is a Pintupi woman who was born in Winparrku, near Papunya.

She began painting after watching her artist niece, Dorothy Napangardi, working. Her works were in high demand at the 2007 Melbourne and Sydney Art Fairs. She was shortlisted for the 2009 Telstra Art Award.

Gibson played Delilah's Nana in Warwick Thornton's Samson and Delilah. For that role she was nominated for the 2009 AFI Award for Best Actress in a Supporting Role. She had previously played the title role in Thorton's short film Nana.
