= Rowan McNamara =

Australian actor

Rowan McNamara is an Aboriginal Australian actor, best known for his role in Samson and Delilah.

== Career ==
McNamara's first acting role was in the 2009 Australian film, Samson and Delilah. He had the lead role in this film, playing the title character of Samson. His role led him to win an Inside Film Award for best actor and he was nominated for the best lead actor award in the 2009 Australian Film Institute Awards.
