= Adelaide Women's Prison =

Prison in Northfield, Australia

- Interactive map of Adelaide Women's Prison
- Location: Grand Junction Road, Northfield, South Australia; 34°50′44″S 138°38′28″E
- Status: Operational
- Security class: Low, high, medium and remand (Female)
- Capacity: 156
- Managed by: Department for Correctional Services

The Adelaide Women's Prison is an Australian prison facility located in the Adelaide suburb of Northfield. It has a capacity of 156 prisoners, and accommodates both sentenced prisoners and those on remand together. The facility contains high, medium and low security prisoners and has video conferencing facilities to enable prisoners to appear in court without leaving the prison. A new visits centre was opened on 15 December 2014, with increased provision for professional visits, three interview rooms and two non-contact rooms.

The prison does not have facilities for babies to stay with their mothers. South Australia is the only state of Australia without such a facility.
