= Samson and Delilah (2009 film) =

- Theatrical release poster
- Directed by: Warwick Thornton
- Written by: Warwick Thornton
- Produced by: Kath Shelper
- Starring: Rowan McNamara; Marissa Gibson
- Cinematography: Warwick Thornton
- Edited by: Roland Gallois
- Music by: Warwick Thornton
- Distributed by: Madman Entertainment
- Release dates: 20 February 2009 (Adelaide); 7 May 2009 (Australia)
- Running time: 97 minutes
- Country: Australia
- Languages: English; Warlpiri

Samson and Delilah is a 2009 Australian tragedy film written and directed by Warwick Thornton and starring Rowan McNamara and Marissa Gibson, both young first-time actors. The film depicts two Indigenous Australian 14-year-olds living in a remote Aboriginal community who steal a car and escape their difficult lives by going to Alice Springs. It won many awards, including the Caméra d'Or at Cannes for best first Feature. It was Australia's submission to the 82nd Academy Awards for the Academy Award for Best Foreign Language Film, making the January shortlist.

== Plot ==
Samson and Delilah are 14-year-olds who live in an Aboriginal community near Alice Springs in Central Australia. Samson is a mute boy who lives in a run-down shelter and is addicted to sniffing petrol. His elder brother's ska band practices outside his bedroom all day, disrupting Samson's sleep. Delilah cares for her frail grandmother, taking her to clinic appointments and managing her medication. Together, Delilah and her grandmother create dot paintings which they sell to an art broker for modest sums. Samson becomes interested in Delilah and awkwardly seeks her attention. In spite of mocking encouragement from her grandmother, Delilah is not interested in him. Samson spends a day following Delilah around and attempts to move in with Delilah uninvited. When Delilah's grandmother dies in the night, Delilah’s family blame her and thrash her with sticks. Samson in a fit of rage hits his brother with a log of wood to silence him and his band, but his brother retaliates and beats him up.

Desperate to escape their circumstances, Samson steals the community’s car and takes Delilah to Alice Springs where they live rough under a bridge over the dry bed of the Todd River. Gonzo, a chronic alcoholic homeless man living there, allows them to stay with him. Delilah sees her paintings for sale in a gallery for several thousands of dollars each. When she tries to sell her work herself, she is rebuffed by both the gallery owner and the public. Samson’s petrol sniffing addiction becomes more severe. At one point, he gets so intoxicated he does not notice when Delilah is kidnapped by a group of white teenagers in a car, where she is raped and beaten. She eventually finds her way back to Samson, but he is too intoxicated to notice. In her despair, Delilah begins sniffing petrol as well.

One day, while the two are walking the streets inebriated, Delilah is hit by a car. When Samson finally sobers and realises what has happened, he believes she is dead and cuts off his hair in mourning. For weeks, he remains under the bridge, lost in grief and sniffing petrol. However, Delilah is released from hospital and returns with his brother to rescue him, bringing them both back to their community. As they arrive, one of the old women begins to beat Samson for stealing the community's only car. In an effort to help Samson overcome his petrol addiction, Delilah takes him to a secluded area for rehabilitation. Over time, she successfully encourages him to return to his original self, and in a moment of joy, Samson hears his brother's ska music playing on the local radio.

== Cast ==
- Rowan McNamara as Samson
- Marissa Gibson as Delilah
- Mitjili Napanangka Gibson as Nana
- Scott Thornton as Gonzo
- Matthew Gibson as Samson's Brother
- Steven Brown as Drummer
- Gregwyn Gibson as Bass Player
- Noreen Robertson Nampijinpa as Fighting Woman
- Kenrick Martin as Wheelchair Boy
- Peter Bartlett as Storekeeper

== Production ==
The film was directed by Warwick Thornton, who describes it as a "survival love story". Both lead actors, Rowan McNamara and Marissa Gibson, were young first-time actors.

== Release ==
The film was selected for screening in numerous Australian and international festivals, including Cannes; Adelaide Film Festival (where it won the Audience Award); Berlin Independent Film Festival; Around the World in 14 Films; St Tropez Film Festival; and others.

== Reception ==
=== Critical response ===
Based on 56 reviews, the film held a 95% Fresh rating on the film review aggregator Rotten Tomatoes in 2009, with an average rating of 7.8/10. The critical consensus states that "Alternately beautiful and heartrending, Samson and Delilah is terrifically acted and shot, and presents a complex portrait of what it means to be Australian." On Metacritic the film has a score of 75% out of 10 critics, indicating generally favourable reviews.

Samson and Delilah received five stars from both Margaret Pomeranz and David Stratton on At The Movies, and was the only film to receive such a rating from the hosts in 2009.

Craig Mathieson of SBS awarded the director's debut feature film four stars out of five, commenting that "the picture has an intrinsic sweetness, a genuine belief in the power of an individual’s love, but it is offset by a brutal worldview."

=== Accolades ===
The film competed in the Un Certain Regard section at the 2009 Cannes Film Festival, winning the Caméra d'Or ('Gold Camera Award' for best first feature film) at the 2009 Cannes Film Festival.

The film won the Asia Pacific Screen Award for Best Film in 2009.

It won the Jury Grand Prix, Best feature film, at the 2009 Rencontres internationales du cinéma des Antipodes (Antipodean Film Festival) at Saint-Tropez, France.

Screen Australia announced on 29 September 2009 that the film had been nominated as Australia's official entry in the Academy Awards Best Foreign Language Film category.

=== Awards ===
Award	Category	Nominee	Result
Art Film Fest	Best Director	Warwick Thornton	Won
Asia Pacific Screen Awards	Best Film	Kath Shelper	Won
Australian Film Institute	Best Direction	Warwick Thornton	Won
Australian Film Institute	Best Film	Kath Shelper	Won
Australian Film Institute	Best Original Screenplay	Warwick Thornton	Won
Australian Film Institute	Best Cinematography	Warwick Thornton	Won
Australian Film Institute	Best Sound		Won
Australian Film Institute	Best Editing	Roland Gallois	Nominated
Australian Film Institute	Best Lead Actor	Rowan McNamara	Nominated
Australian Film Institute	Best Lead Actress	Marissa Gibson	Nominated
Australian Film Institute	Best Supporting Actress	Mitjili Napanangka Gibson	Nominated
Australian Screen Sound Guild	Best Sound Design		Won
Australian Writers' Guild	Feature Film	Warwick Thornton	Won
Australian Writers' Guild	Major Award	Warwick Thornton	Won
Cannes Film Festival	Golden Camera Award	Warwick Thornton	Won
Dublin International Film Festival	Best Film	Warwick Thornton	Won
Film Critics Circle of Australia Awards	Best Cinematography		Won
Film Critics Circle of Australia Awards	Best Director	Warwick Thornton	Won
Film Critics Circle of Australia Awards	Best Film	Kath Shelper	Won
Film Critics Circle of Australia Awards	Best Actress	Marissa Gibson	Nominated
Film Critics Circle of Australia Awards	Best Editing		Nominated
Film Critics Circle of Australia Awards	Best Screenplay		Nominated
IF Awards	Best Sound		Nominated
Palm Springs International Film Festival	John Schlesinger Award – Honorable Mention	Warwick Thornton	Won

=== Box office ===
Samson and Delilah grossed A$3,188,931 at the box office in Australia.

== See also ==
- Cinema of Australia
- List of submissions to the 82nd Academy Awards for Best Foreign Language Film
- List of Australian submissions for the Academy Award for Best Foreign Language Film
