= AACTA Awards =

Australian cinema and television awards

- Current: 15th AACTA Awards
- AACTA Award statuette
- Awarded for: "To recognise and honour outstanding achievement in the Australian film and television industry."
- Country: Australia
- Presented by: Australian Academy of Cinema and Television Arts (AACTA)
- First award: Founded as the Australian Film Institute Awards (AFI Awards) 1958; 68 years ago (to honour achievements of 1957/1958)
- Website: www.aacta.org

Television/radio coverage
- Network: ABC (1977, 1980–83, 1986–87, 1989–90, 1993, 1995, 1997, 2003–04); SBS (1998–2000); Seven Network (1978, 2001, 2016–20); Nine Network (1976, 2005–12); Ovation (2004); Network 10 (1985, 2002, 2013–15, 2021–present); Arena (2013–21); Famous (2022–2025)

The Australian Academy of Cinema and Television Arts Awards, known as the AACTA Awards, are presented annually by the Australian Academy of Cinema and Television Arts (AACTA). The awards recognise excellence in the film and television industry, both locally and internationally, including the producers, directors, actors, writers, and cinematographers. It is the most prestigious awards ceremony for the Australian film and television industry. They are generally considered to be the Australian counterpart of the Academy Awards for the United States and the BAFTA Awards for the United Kingdom.

The awards, previously called Australian Film Institute Awards or AFI Awards, began in 1958, and involved 30 nominations across six categories. They expanded in 1986 to cover television as well as film. The AACTA Awards were instituted in 2011. The AACTA International Awards, inaugurated on 27 January 2012, are presented every January in Los Angeles.

== History ==
=== 1958–2010: AFI Awards ===
The awards were presented annually by the Australian Film Institute (AFI) as the Australian Film Institute Awards (more commonly known as the AFI Awards), "to recognise and honour outstanding achievement in the Australian film and television industry." They were instituted in 1958, "as a way to improve the impoverished state of Australian cinema", and was part of the Melbourne International Film Festival (known then as the Melbourne Film Festival) until 1972. The first AFI Awards ceremony consisted of seven fields: Documentary, Educational, Advertising, Experimental Film, Public Relations and Teaching, and an Open category for other films which did not fit in the aforementioned categories.

Between 1958 and 1980, submitted films were presented with a gold, silver or bronze prize, and in some circumstances, a Grand Prix award, which was the highest honour a film could receive. Additionally, films were also presented with a gold or silver medallion for technical achievements, and films which did not receive a prize were given a certificate of honourable mention. From the awards inception to 1968, documentary and educational films were the only films submitted for awards due to few feature films produced in Australia, but in 1969, Jack and Jill: A Postscript became the first feature film to receive an award from the AFI, with a silver prize in the "Open" category, and is considered a winner in the Best Film category of the current awards.

Up until 1970, prizes were handed out in recognition of the film and production, rather than achievements of individual filmmakers and crafts people. However, from 1971 special achievement awards were introduced to recognise actors, directors, screenwriters, musicians, editors and cinematographers in feature films, and from 1975, an additional cash prize was given per achievement. In 1977 feature film categories became competitive, while non-feature films continued to be awarded the gold, silver and bronze prizes until 1981, when they also became competitive.

In 1976 the awards were broadcast live on television for the first time on the Nine Network at the Hilton Hotel in Melbourne. In 1986 television categories were introduced, presenting awards for mini-series and telefeatures before expanding to dramas, comedies and documentaries in the 1990s.

=== 2011–present: AACTA Awards ===
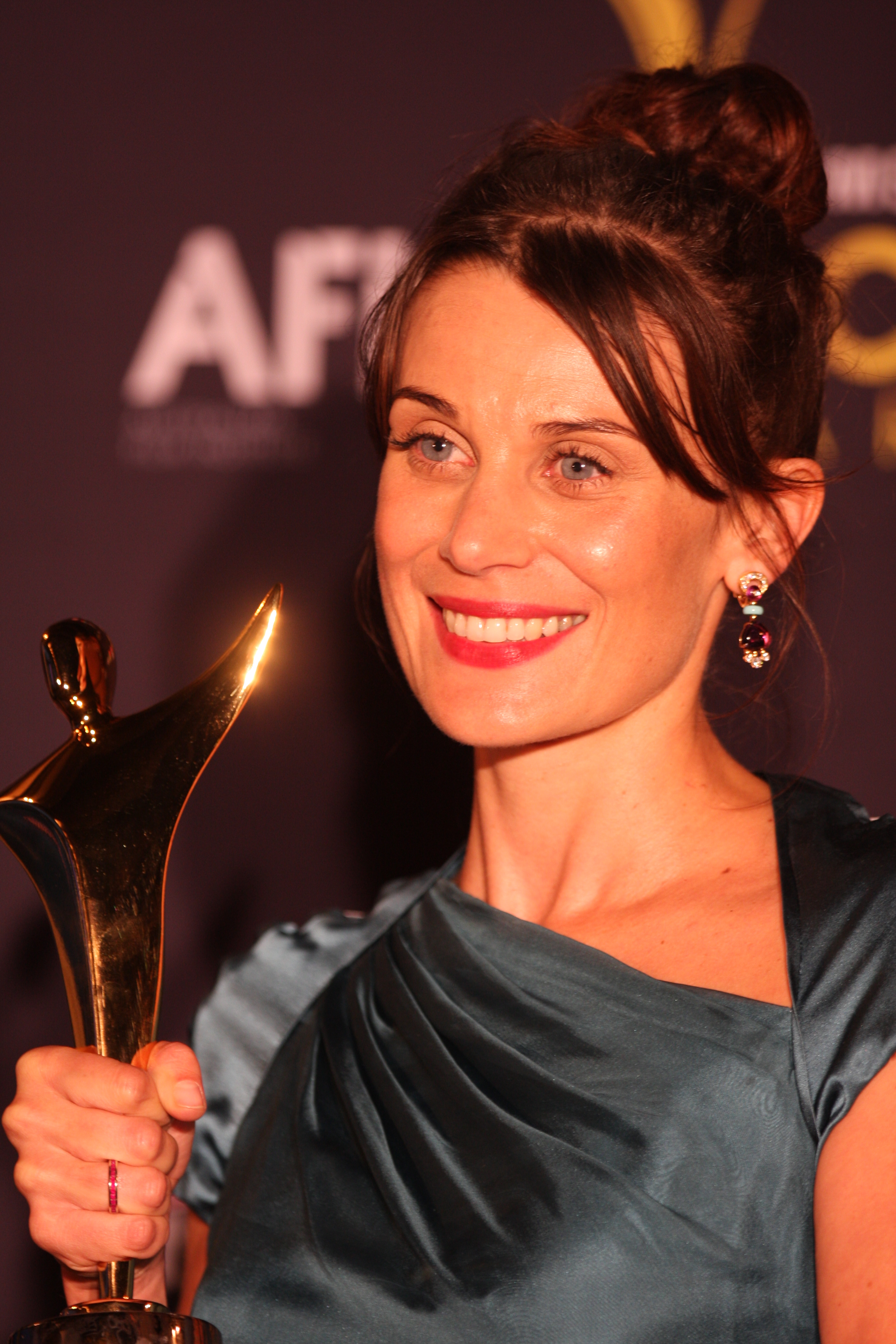
Actress Diana Glenn with an AACTA Award in 2012.

In June 2011, the AFI announced an industry consultation for an "Australian Academy". The aim of the Academy is to create awareness for Australian film in local and international markets and to improve the way the AFI rewards practitioners with the formation of an "Honorary Council". Of the announcement Damian Trewhella, CEO of the AFI said, "We thought a better way to engage with the industry would be to try and improve our professional membership structure...It's quite a big improvement on the way the AFI does things." The consultation period ended in July 2011 and on 20 July it was announced that the AFI would go ahead with the Australian Academy with Trewhella stating that "[The AFI] envisage that this will lead to greater opportunities for those working in the industry, as well as greater audience recognition and connection with Australian screen content."

The name of the new Academy was revealed on 18 August 2011 as the Australian Academy of Cinema and Television Arts (AACTA), with the awards renamed to the AACTA Awards. Prior to this announcement, the awards date and location was changed to January 2012 at the Sydney Opera House in Sydney as opposed to Melbourne where it was held for the majority of the AFI Awards history. The date change was made to align the awards with the international awards season. When the Academy announced the dates for the inaugural awards season, they introduced awards which "recognise international excellence within the categories of best film, acting, writing and direction". On 23 November 2011, it was announced that the first award to be handed out since the Academy's inception is the Longford Lyell Award, which was presented to Don McAlpine for his contribution to cinematography, at the inaugural awards luncheon.

Also in 2011, the first AACTA International Awards were launched, to take place around a month before the Oscars in Los Angeles, "to recognise excellence within the categories of best film, best acting, writing and directing and is open to any international film, voted on by the Australian academy". As of 2023, the scope of these awards had broadened, to "honour the best achievements in screen excellence, regardless of geography... [and to honour] our international screen peers and celebrate fellow Australians working in screen internationally".

In 2018, two new categories were announced for the 8th AACTA Awards: AACTA Award for Best Indie Film, and AACTA Award for Best Casting in Film presented by Casting Networks.

== Rules and voting ==
To be eligible for nomination, a production must be an Australian production or program and, in the case of a film, cannot have been previously submitted for consideration; the material is sent to the AFI in DVD or video formats; for a feature film, it must have been publicly exhibited for seven consecutive days in at least two Australian states; for television and documentaries, the production must have been broadcast on television between the eligibility period. The submission of a production is accompanied by an entry fee in Australian dollars, of up to A$1680 for feature films, $400 for documentaries, $330 for short film and animation and $1125 for television categories.

At the time of the awards inception, a jury of five judges, composed of film critics and filmmakers, determined the winner of a production. In 1976, the jury system was replaced by a peer voting process for feature films which would allow public members the right to vote, but only in the Best Film category. The nominees and winners were later peer-voted by a jury which was made up of representatives from all industry crafts, including members of guilds, who have a "professional membership" with the AFI.
When the AFI announced the launch of the Australian Academy of Cinema and Television Arts, it introduced the Chapters who vote through a two step voting process. The fifteen Chapters consist of professionals from industry guilds and organisations including actors, producers, directors and screenwriters. In round one of feature film voting, each chapter determines the nominees for their own respective category; in round two all members of the Academy can vote for the shortlisted nominees in each category to determine the winner. All television and non-feature film awards, and feature film pre-selection are determined by juries. Members of the Australian Film Institute are eligible to vote in the Best Short Fiction Film, Best Short Animation, and Audience Choice award categories only. The votes are audited by accounting firm Ernst and Young from 2011.

== Statuette ==
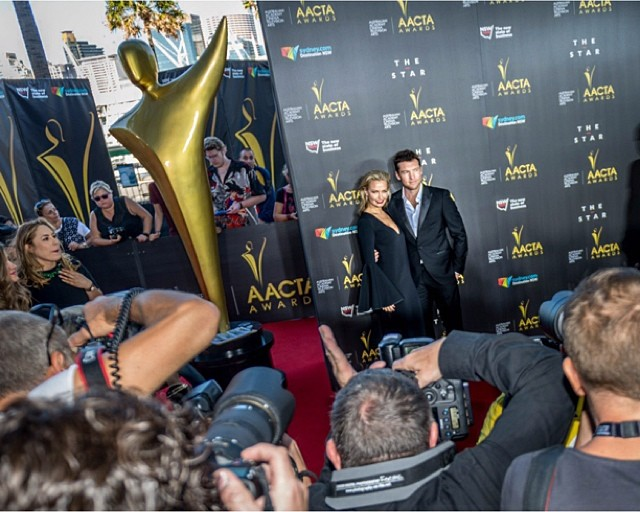
AACTA Awards Statuette on Red Carpet in 2014.

Throughout the history of the awards there have been several differently designed awards given to winners. Most notable ones given are: the "Kodak film award", a gold, silver or bronze medal, which was handed out from 1958 to 1975; the Grand Prix award which was a "bronze leaf shaped award mounted on a square wooden base", also presented between 1958 and 1975; a statuette, made of acrylic on a silver metal base, handed out from 1979 to 2010; and a gold statuette, based on the Southern Cross constellation, which has been in use since 2012 for the 2011 AACTA Awards.

A medal was used between 1958 and 1975 as a gold, silver or bronze prize and depicted "three leaping jesters. Around left side, film strip with leaping jester in each frame. Around right side: THE KODAK FILM AWARD". The medal, which was designed by Andor Mészáros, represents two elements of film-making: the leaping jesters represent what the audience sees on screen; the roll of film on the right symbolises the individual frames which capture the motion depicted. It was designed in Melbourne, Victoria and minted by John Pinchas in London, in 1958.

The statuette used between 1979 and 2010 is made of "four clear acrylic rectangular prisms on a silver metal base, green felt on bottom"; a plaque, which is attached to the base, has the "afi" insignia, with the words "Australian Film Institute" beneath it; a description of the award category, the recipient of the award, and the film title cascade below each other. The statuette stands at 295mm in height, 70mm in width and 70mm in depth.

When the Australian Film Institute launched the Australian Academy of Cinema and Television Arts, it set out to create a new gold cast statuette. The statuette, which will be handed out from 2012, for the inaugural AACTA Awards, had to "reflect the prestige and heritage of the Awards[...] but which was above all distinctly Australian", while incorporating the Southern Cross constellation and the human spirit. After receiving submissions from Australian artists, with their interpretations of the design brief, a statuette designed by sculptor Ron Gomboc became the winning design. The statuette, which has a 22 karat gold body, whose human form takes on the shape of the Southern Cross, on a tiger iron gemstone base, was designed over three months at Gomboc's home in Western Australia, before it was presented to the AFI board in June 2011. Gomboc worked with stone artist, Richard Williamson, who cut and polished each individual gemstone base for the statuette, with each base representing "[...] the unique talent and contribution to the industry of every AACTA Award recipient." When the statuette was unveiled at the launch of the Academy by Geoffrey Rush, he announced that a competition to name the award would commence, where people could log onto the Academy's Facebook page and post potential names on its wall. In the media it was well received, with Gary Maddox from the Sydney Morning Herald comparing it to the previous statuette, stating that it, "looks less like a lethal doorstop and more like a stylised Oscar, possibly Oscar's flamboyant brother waving 'hi'". The AACTA Award statuette remains the property of the Australian Film Institute, and is to remain with the winner and their heirs and descendants. It cannot be sold to a third party and if it were to part from the winner or their heir and descendants, the Academy reserves the right to repurchase it for one dollar. The award may, however, have its ownership transferred to a museum, gallery or other not-for-profit institution, at the AFI's discretion.

== Ceremony ==
The awards were first presented in 1958 during the Melbourne Film Festival at Melbourne University's Union Theatre. Since its inception, the awards have been predominantly presented in Melbourne but the event has alternated in there and Sydney during the 1990s and 2000s (decade). Awards are handed out over two separate events; the AACTA Awards Luncheon, a black tie event where accolades are given for achievements in non-feature and short films, film production (with the exception of the Best Film, Direction and Screenplay awards), non-drama related television programs and the Longford Lyell Award; the AACTA Awards Ceremony presents the awards in all other categories at a larger venue and is broadcast on television. Awards were presented at the end of each calendar year (November or December) to celebrate film achievements of the corresponding year but beginning in 2012, the awards date was changed to January to celebrate films from the previous year.

== List of AACTA ceremonies ==
Past ceremonies and a selection of main awards are shown below.

Year	Ceremony	International ceremony	Host	Best Film winner	Best International Film winner	Best TV Drama Series winner	Best Documentary winner	Longford Lyell Award winner
2012	1st AACTA Awards	1st AACTA International Awards	Russell Crowe	Red Dog	The Artist	East West 101	Mrs Carey's Concert	Don McAlpine
2013	2nd AACTA Awards	2nd AACTA International Awards	Russell Crowe	The Sapphires	Silver Linings Playbook	Puberty Blues	Storm Surfers 3D	Al Clark
2014	3rd AACTA Awards	3rd AACTA International Awards	Shane Bourne	The Great Gatsby	Gravity	Redfern Now	Red Obsession	Jacki Weaver
2015	4th AACTA Awards	4th AACTA International Awards	Cate Blanchett; Deborah Mailman	The Babadook; The Water Diviner	Birdman	The Code	Ukraine is Not a Brothel	Andrew Knight
2015	5th AACTA Awards	5th AACTA International Awards	N/A	Mad Max: Fury Road		Glitch	That Sugar Film	Cate Blanchett
2016	6th AACTA Awards	6th AACTA International Awards	N/A	Hacksaw Ridge	La La Land	Wentworth	Chasing Asylum	Paul Hogan
2017	7th AACTA Awards	7th AACTA International Awards	N/A	Lion	Three Billboards Outside Ebbing, Missouri	Top of the Lake: China Girl	Casting JonBenet	Phillip Noyce
2018	8th AACTA Awards	8th AACTA International Awards	Stephen Curry	Sweet Country	Roma	Mystery Road	Gurrumul	Bryan Brown
2019	9th AACTA Awards	9th AACTA International Awards	Shane Jacobson	The Nightingale	Parasite	Total Control	The Australian Dream	Sam Neill
2020	10th AACTA Awards	10th AACTA International Awards	Tom Gleeson; Susie Youssef; Rove McManus	Babyteeth	Promising Young Woman	Mystery Road	Firestarter – The Story of Bangarra	N/A
2021	11th AACTA Awards	11th AACTA International Awards	N/A	Nitram	The Power of the Dog	The Newsreader	My Name is Gulpilil	David Gulpilil
2022	12th AACTA Awards	12th AACTA International Awards	Amanda Keller; Rove McManus	Elvis	Avatar: The Way of Water	Mystery Road: Origin	River	Catherine Matin
2024	13th AACTA Awards	13th AACTA International Awards	Rebel Wilson	Talk to Me	Barbie	The Newsreader	John Farnham: Finding the Voice	N/A
2025	14th AACTA Awards	14th AACTA International Awards	Russell Crowe	Better Man		Heartbreak High	Otto by Otto	Working Dog Productions
2026	15th AACTA Awards	15th AACTA International Awards	Celeste Barber	Bring Her Back	One Battle After Another	The Newsreader	Journey Home, David Gulpilil	Bruce Beresford

== Categories ==
=== AACTA Awards ===
==== Feature films ====
- Best Film
- Best Indie Film
- Best Direction
- Best Lead Actress
- Best Lead Actor
- Best Supporting Actress
- Best Supporting Actor
- Best Adapted Screenplay
- Best Original Screenplay
- Best Original Music Score
- Best Sound
- Best Production Design
- Best Costume Design
- Best Editing
- Best Cinematography
- Best Casting in Film

==== Television ====
- Best Comedy Series^{[A]}
- Best Drama Series^{[B]}
- Best Children's Series^{[C]}
- Best Children's Animation
- Best Miniseries or Telefeature^{[D]}
- AACTA Award for Best Light Entertainment Television Series
- Best Comedy Performance^{[E]}
- Best Actor – Drama^{[F]}^{[E]}
- Best Actress – Drama^{[F]}^{[E]}
- Best Guest or Supporting Actor – Drama^{[G]}
- Best Guest or Supporting Actress – Drama^{[G]}
- Best Screenplay^{[I]}
- Best Reality Television Series
- Best Direction – Drama or Comedy^{[H]}
- Best Direction – Light Entertainment or Reality Series
- Best Screenplay
- AACTA Award for Best Documentary or Factual Program
- AACTA Award for Best Cinematography in Television
- AACTA Award for Best Costume Design in Television
- AACTA Award for Best Editing in Television
- AACTA Award for Best Original Music Score in Television
- AACTA Award for Best Production Design in Television
- AACTA Award for Best Sound in Television

==== Other ====
- Best Feature Length Documentary
- Best Documentary Under One Hour
- Best Documentary Series
- Best Short Animation
- Best Short Fiction Film
- Best Cinematography – Documentary
- Best Director – Documentary
- Best Editing – Documentary
- Best Screenplay in a Short Film
- Best Sound – Documentary
- Best Original Score – Documentary
- Best Young Actor
- Best Visual Effects

=== AACTA International Awards ===
As of 2023

- Best Film – International
- Best Lead Actor in Film – International
- Best Lead Actress in Film – International
- Best Supporting Actor in Film – International
- Best Supporting Actress in Film – International
- Best Direction – International
- Best Screenplay – International
- Best Drama Series – International
- Best Comedy Series – International
- Best Actress in a Series – International
- Best Actor in a Series – International

=== Special awards ===
- Byron Kennedy Award
- Longford Lyell Award
- Screen Content Innovation Award
- Outstanding Achievement in Television Screen Craft
- Outstanding Achievement in Short Film Screen Craft

=== Retired awards ===
- Best Television Documentary
- Best Sponsored Documentary
- Best Experimental Film
- Global Achievement Award
- Best Foreign Film
- International Award Excellence in Filmmaking
- Jury Prize
- International Best Actor
- International Best Actress
- Best Screenplay, Original or Adapted
- AFI Members' Choice Award

== Hosts / television coverage ==
- 1995: Hosted by Magda Szubanski
- 1997: Hosted by Hugh Jackman
- 1998: Hosted by Mary Coustas
- 1999–2000: Hosted by Jonathan Biggins
- 2001: Hosted by Sigrid Thornton, John Doyle and Greig Pickhaver
- 2002: Hosted by Paul McDermott
- 2003: Hosted by Tony Squires
- 2004: Hosted by Peter Berner
- 2005: Hosted by Russell Crowe
- 2006–2007: Hosted by Geoffrey Rush
- 2008: Hosted by Stephen Curry
- 2009: Hosted by Julia Zemiro
- 2010: Hosted by Shane Jacobson
- 2011: Hosted by Geoffrey Rush, Rachael Taylor, Richard Wilkins and Julia Morris
- 2012–2013: Hosted by Russell Crowe
- 2014: Hosted by Shane Bourne
- 2015: Hosted by Cate Blanchett, Deborah Mailman
- 2016–2017: No hosts
- 2018: Hosted by Stephen Curry
- 2019: Hosted by Shane Jacobson
- 2020: Film hosted by Susie Youssef and Rove McManus; Television hosted by Tom Gleeson
- 2021: No hosts
- 2022: Hosted by Amanda Keller and Rove McManus
- 2024: Hosted by Rebel Wilson
- 2025: Hosted by Russell Crowe
- 2026: Hosted by Celeste Barber

== Criticisms and controversies ==
There have been controversial decisions of the Australian Film Institute Awards that have led to claims that it has broken its own rules by including an unscreened mini series in the 2005 awards judging:

The controversy is a blow for the institute, which after years of criticism this year revamped its awards in an effort to restore credibility. Producer John Edwards, who collected seven nominations for Foxtel's Love My Way, did not enter a second drama series, The Surgeon, because it missed the screening deadline. "If I'd known it was this flexible, of course I would have entered it," Edwards said. "Awards are useless if they break their own rules."

AFIA has also been criticised for narrow selection of artists for award nominations and an unfair judging process.

There has also been controversy over both the exclusion and inclusion of films that are technically Australian productions, but are made overseas, with foreign funding and/or foreign talent.

- A lack of recognition for the Australian film production Disgrace (released in late 2008) was noted by critics Eddie Cockrell and Lynden Barber, commentator Charles Waterstreet and others. The film – based on a book by the South African-born Australian novelist J. M. Coetzee, set in South Africa and made on location there with an international cast – was directed and adapted for the screen by the Australian husband and wife team of Anna Maria Monticelli and Steve Jacobs.
- Conversely, the 13 AACTA awards, including an acting award presented to Leonardo DiCaprio, received in 2014 by Baz Luhrmann's The Great Gatsby were controversial, due to the film's perceived Americanness. Lurhrmann pointed out that – although the film was financed by a major US film studio and based on a classic US novel of the same name – Gatsby met the criteria of an Australian production.

== See also ==
- List of television awards
- Cinema of Australia

== Notes ==
A: From 2003–2005, the Best Television Comedy Series award was known as Best Comedy Series – Sitcom or Sketch.
B: In 1993, and then from 1995 to 2001, the award was split into two categories: Best Episode in a Television Drama, Series or Serial and Best Episode in a Television Drama Serial (the latter was changed to Best Episode in a Television Drama Series (Long) in 1998).
C: From 1991–2010, the Best Children's Television Series was known as Best Children's Television Drama.
D: From 1986–1989, the Best Telefeature, Mini Series or Short Run Series was two separate categories for Mini Series and Telefeatures. The two categories were merged in 1990 and became known as Best Telefeature or Mini Series, and in 2008 the awards name was changed to include Short Run Series.
E^{1} ^{2} ^{3} : The award for Best Comedy Performance, and the awards for Best Lead Actor and Best Actress in a Television Drama was merged from 2004–2005 as the award for Best Actor and Best Actress in a Leading Role in a Television Drama or Comedy. They were separated in 2006 when the Best Comedy Performance award was introduced.
F^{1} ^{2} : The awards for Best Lead Actor and Best Lead Actress in a Television Drama was first awarded in 1986, in two categories for performance by an actor in a Mini Series and Telefeature. The two awards were merged, and presented in 1990, and was changed again in 1991 as the award for Best Actor in a Leading Role and Best Actress in a Leading Role in a Television Drama. In 2000 the awards for Best Actor and Best Actress in a Telefeature or Mini Series was re-introduced as a separate category. From 2002 all awards were combined under the titles Best Lead Actor and Best Lead Actress in a Television Drama.
G^{1} ^{2} : The awards for Best Guest or Supporting Actor and Best Guest or Supporting Actress was first awarded for a performance in a guest role in a television drama from 2000–2001. In 2002, the categories were changed to Best Actor and Best Actress in a Supporting or Guest Role in a Television Drama, and in 2004 it became Best Actor and Best Actress in a Supporting or Guest Role in a Television Drama or Comedy. In 2006, the Best Guest or Supporting Actor in Television Drama was reintroduced after the Best Comedy Performance award was established.
H: From 1986–1989 the award for Best Direction in Television was presented in two separate categories for Mini Series and Telefeatures. In 1990 both categories were merged as Best Direction in a Telefeature or Mini Series, and in 1991 it was renamed Best Achievement in Direction in a Television Drama. It then became Best Direction in Television in 2004.
I: From 1986–1989 the award for Best Screenplay in Television was presented in two separate categories for Mini Series and Telefeatures. In 1990 both categories were merged as Best Screenplay in a Telefeature or Mini Series, and in 1991 it was renamed Best Screenplay in a Television Drama. It then became Best Screenplay in Television in 2004.
